= Barishaki Cheborion =

Ugandan lawyer and judge

- Born: Uganda
- Education: Makerere University (Bachelor of Laws); Law Development Centre (Diploma in Legal Practice)
- Occupations: Lawyer, judge
- Years active: 1988 — present
- Known for: Law
- Title: Justice of the Court of Appeal of Uganda

Barishaki Bonny Cheborion is a Ugandan lawyer and judge, who serves as a justice of the Court of Appeal of Uganda, since September 2015.

== Background and education ==
He was born in present-day Kapchorwa District; his father is the late George William Cheborion (24 November 1928 to 2 March 2014). He attended Makerere University, the oldest and largest public university in Uganda, graduating with a Bachelor of Laws (LLB) degree. Later he obtained a Diploma in Legal Practice, from the Law Development Centre, in Kampala, Uganda's capital city. Barishaki Bonny Cheborion was admitted to the Uganda Bar and is a practicing attorney.

== Work experience ==
He has a long service record in the Office of the Attorney General of Uganda and in the Uganda Ministry of Justice and Constitutional Affairs, where he rose to the rank of Director for Civil Litigation.

== Judicial career ==
In September 2015, he was appointed to the Court of Appeal of Uganda, which doubles as the Constitutional Court of Uganda, where he still sits as of December 2017.

== Other considerations ==
He is a member of the Uganda Law Society.

== See also ==
- Kenneth Kakuru
- Solome Bossa
- Hellen Obura
- Remmy Kasule
- Supreme Court of Uganda
