= Jane Frances Abodo =

Ugandan lawyer and judge (born 1982)

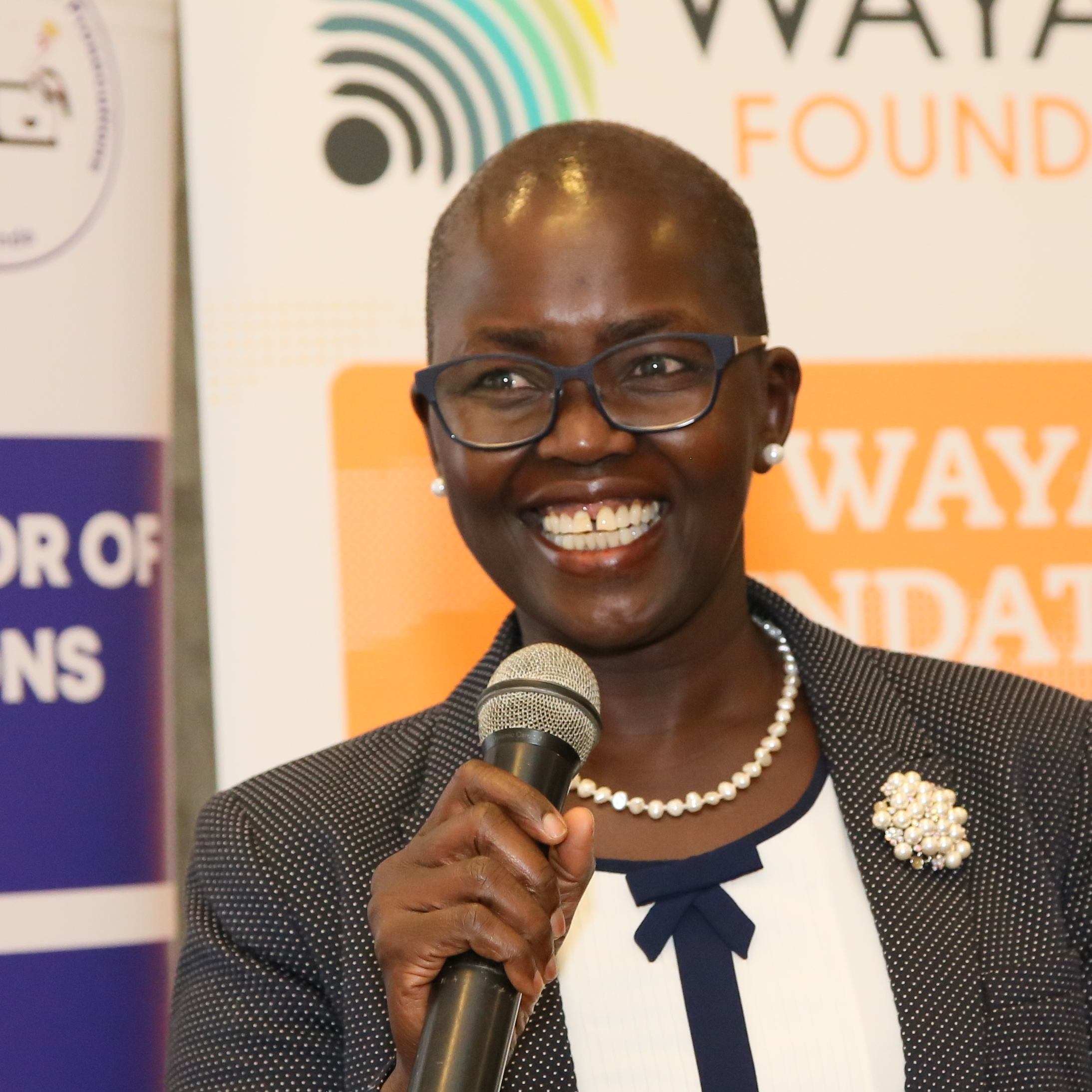
- in 2023
- Born: 1973 (age 52–53); Karamoja sub-region, Uganda
- Education: Makerere University (Bachelor of Laws); Law Development Centre (Diploma in Legal Practice); Trinity College Dublin (Master of Laws)
- Occupations: Lawyer, judge
- Years active: 2007 - present
- Known for: Prosecutorial ability
- Title: Director of Public Prosecutions in Uganda
- Spouse: 1

Jane Frances Abodo is Uganda's Principal Judge who prior to her appointment in August 2025 served as the Director of Public Prosecutions (DPP) in Uganda from April 2020 Her appointment to replace Flavian Zeija who currently serves as the Deputy Chief Justice was subjected to mandatory parliamentary vetting by the house committee on appointments chaired by the Speaker of Parliament on 2 September 2025. Before her appointment, she also served as a High Court Judge, in the court's Criminal Division, from February 2018 until April 2020.

== Background and education ==
Abodo was born in the Karamoja sub-region, the 9th-born among 62 siblings. She holds a Bachelor of Laws degree from Makerere University, the oldest and largest public university in the country. She also holds a postgraduate Diploma in Legal Practice, obtained from the Law Development Centre, in Kampala. Her degree of Master of Laws was awarded by Trinity College Dublin, in Ireland.

== Career ==
=== As a lawyer ===
Abodo worked in the office of the DPP for eight years, starting circa 2007. She started out as a trainee state attorney and gradually rose through the ranks, of state attorney, senior state attorney, principal state attorney, assistant DPP to senior assistant DPP. At the time she was appointed as a High Court Justice, Abodo was Senior Assistant DPP and was the head of the Anti Corruption desk in the office of the DPP.

=== As a judge ===
In February 2018, Abodo was appointed as a justice of the High Court of Uganda. She was sworn in on 23 March 2018, by president Yoweri Museveni of Uganda, at State House Entebbe. She was posted to the Criminal Division of the High Court and served in that capacity until her most recent assignment.

Following vetting by the Ugandan parliament, she will replace Michael Chibita, who was appointed to the Supreme Court of Uganda in December 2019.

== Family ==
Jane Frances Abodo is married to Achia Remegio.

== Other considerations ==
In 2015, Abodo was recognized by the Uganda Law Society (ULS) as the best prosecutor of the year. That year, her office recorded the highest conviction rates in the country.

One of the recent criminal cases that she handled, was that of State vs Godfrey Wamala Troy. In a criminal session that sat in the city of Entebbe, Justice Jane Frances Abodo found Godfrey Wamala Troy guilty of manslaughter in connection with the murder of the singer, Mowzey Radio whose real name was Moses Ssekibogo. She sentenced the convict to 14 years in prison.

== See also ==
- Doris Akol
- Faith Mwondha
- Irene Mulyagonja
