= Sarah Langa Siu =

Ugandan lawyer

- Born: circa 1979; Uganda
- Education: Makerere University (Bachelor of Laws) (Master of Laws); Law Development Centre (Postgraduate Diploma in Legal Practice); Uganda Management Institute (Diploma in Public Administration)
- Occupation: Lawyer
- Years active: 2008–present

Sarah Langa Siu (born circa 1979) is a Ugandan lawyer. She is the Chief Registrar of the Uganda Judiciary. As the chief registrar, she supervises a team of registrars to assist the Principal Judge in administering the magistrates courts in the country. She was appointed to that position on 14 August 2020. The Chief Registrar is also the spokesperson of the Uganda Judiciary.

== Background and education ==
She attended Ugandan schools for her elementary and secondary education. She was admitted to Makerere University, Uganda's oldest and largest public university, where she graduated with a Bachelor of Laws degree. She followed that with a Postgraduate Diploma in Legal Practice from the Law Development Center, in Kampala. She also holds a Master of Laws degree, awarded by Makerere University. In addition, she graduated from the Uganda Management Institute with a postgraduate Diploma in Public Administration

== Career ==
She joined the judiciary in 2005, as a Magistrate Grade I. Over time, she rose through the judicial ranks to the level of Deputy Registrar at the Civil Division of the High Court of Uganda. This is the position that she held before she was elevated to her current assignment. Her new position, is at the level of a Permanent Secretary. Langa replaces Esta Nambayo, who was appointed a judge of the High Court in 2019.

As Chief Registrar, she is the fifth-highest ranking member of the Uganda Judiciary, behind 1. the Chief Justice 2. the Deputy Chief Justice 3. the Principal Judge and 4. the Secretary to the Judiciary.

== Other considerations ==
In 2014, under her leadership as acting assistant registrar, the Anti-Corruption Division of the High Court held its first open day court. The open day has since been adopted as one of the activities to mark the International Anti-Corruption Week. In 2015, she was recognized for outstanding performance by the then chief justice, Bart Magunda Katureebe.

She is a member of the Human Rights and Accountability Working Group of the Justice Law and Order Sector (JLOS) in Uganda. She is the chairperson of the Accountability Sub-Committee of the Group.

She also serves as the chairperson, in acting capacity, of Centre for Transformative Parenting and Research, a Ugandan non government organization.

== See also ==
- Flavian Zeija
- High Court of Uganda
- Court of Appeal of Uganda
- Supreme Court of Uganda
