= Kenneth Kakuru =

Ugandan lawyer and judge (born 9 November 1958)

- Born: 1958 (age 67–68); Uganda
- Died: Tuesday 7 March 2023; Aga Khan Hospital, Nairobi, Kenya
- Citizenship: Uganda
- Education: Makerere University (Bachelor of Laws) (Master of Laws); Law Development Centre (Diploma in Legal Practice); Kyambogo University (Master of Arts in Educational Policy Planning and Development)
- Occupations: Lawyer, judge
- Years active: 1988 — 2023
- Known for: Law
- Title: Justice of the Court of Appeal of Uganda
- Spouse(s): Charity Nankunda Kakuru; Winnie Ikiriza Kakuru (d. 2009)

Kenneth Kakuru was an Ugandan Jurist, who served as a Justice of the Court of Appeal of Uganda from 2013 until his death in 2023. He was described as an incorruptible judicial officer, who excelled in his career and always passed on his rulings relying on the will of God.

== Background and education ==
He was born in Uganda and attended local schools for his primary and secondary school education. He studied law at Makerere University, graduating with a Bachelor of Laws (LLB) degree. Later, he graduated with a Master of Laws (LLM) degree, also from Makerere University. His Diploma in Legal Practice was obtained from the Law Development Centre, in Kampala, Uganda's capital and largest city. He also holds a Master of Arts (MA) degree in Educational Policy Planning and Development, awarded by Kyambogo University.

== Work history ==
Kakuru was the founder and Senior Partner of the law firm of Kakuru & Company Advocates, a Kampala-based law firm, established in 1987. He established a reputation as an environmental rights attorney and an expert in public interest litigation. He founded and at the time of his death still served as a non-executive director of Greenwatch Uganda, an environmental advocacy non-profit.

== Judicial career ==
In May 2013, Kakuru was appointed directly to the Uganda Court of Appeal. Among his professional affiliations, he is a member of the Uganda Law Society, the East African Law Society, the Environmental Law Alliance Worldwide and the International Bar Association.

== Other considerations ==
He was an associate professor at the Uganda Pentecostal University, based in Fort Portal, Kabarole District. He was also an external examiner at the Law Development Center.

== Family ==
Kenneth Kakuru was married to the late Winnie Ikiriza Kakuru (1 June 1958 to 8 March 2009), from 12 September 1987 until her death in 2009, and together they are the parents of three children, Sama, Tracy and Rose. On 14 January 2012, he married Charity Nankunda Kakuru, his current wife.

== See also ==
- Solome Bossa
- Hellen Obura
- Remmy Kasule
- Supreme Court of Uganda
