= Olive Kazaarwe Mukwaya =

- Born: 1975 (age 50–51); Uganda
- Citizenship: Uganda
- Education: Makerere University (Bachelor of Laws); Law Development Centre (Diploma in Legal Practice); Uganda Management Institute (Diploma in Public Administration)
- Occupations: Lawyer, judge
- Years active: 1999–present
- Title: Registrar, Uganda inspectorate of Courts

Olive Kazaarwe Mukwaya (née Olive Kazaarwe) is a Ugandan lawyer and judge who serves as the commission secretary of the presidential Commission of Inquiry into Land Matters in Uganda, established by president Yoweri Museveni in December 2016. Immediately prior to her appointment to this commission, she served as a registrar in the Planning and Development Division of the Judiciary of Uganda. There she oversaw the implementation of a multi-million dollar "Good Governance Project", funded by a donation from DANIDA to the Government of Uganda.

== Background and education ==
Mukwaya graduated from the Faculty of Law of Makerere University, Uganda's largest and oldest public university, with a Bachelor of Laws, circa 1997. The following year, she was awarded a Diploma in Legal Practice by the Law Development Centre, in Kampala, Uganda's capital city. She also holds a Diploma in Public Administration from the Uganda Management Institute, also in Kampala.

== Career ==
After her admission to the Uganda Bar in 1999, Mukwaya took up employment with the law firm of Ruyondo & Company Advocates, working there for one year as an associate attorney. In 2000, she was appointed as a grade one magistrate, serving in that capacity until 2004. She was then promoted to senior grade one magistrate, serving there for four years, from 2004 to 2008.

In 2009, she left the bench and went to work as the personal assistant to then Deputy Chief Justice Laetitia Mukasa Kikonyogo, for a year. In 2010, Mukwaya was promoted to chief magistrate. She served in that capacity in the Hoima Court Circuit and the Buganda Road Courts in Kampala for four years. In 2014, she was posted to the Inspectorate of Courts Division as anaAssistantrRegistrar, working there briefly before she took up assignment at the DANIDA-funded project. She is now a judge at Land Division of the High Court.

== Commission of inquiry ==
On 8 December 2016, President Yoweri Museveni appointed a seven-person commission of inquiry into the current laws affecting the acquisition, registration, management, use and sale of land in Uganda. He selected Justice Catherine Bamugemereire as the commission's chairperson and Mukwaya as the secretary. The commission was sworn in on 21 February 2017. The Uganda Land Commission of Inquiry started its hearings in May 2017, with its final report expected in January 2018, six months from its first hearing.

== Other consideration ==
Mukwaya is an external examiner at the Law Development Centre. She is also the secretary of the National Association of Women Judges of Uganda, a professional group. On 7 February 2018, President Yoweri Museveni appointed Mukwaya to the High Court of Uganda, pending parliamentary approval.

== See also ==
- Ministry of Justice and Constitutional Affairs (Uganda)
