= Robina Gureme Rwakoojo =

Ugandan politician

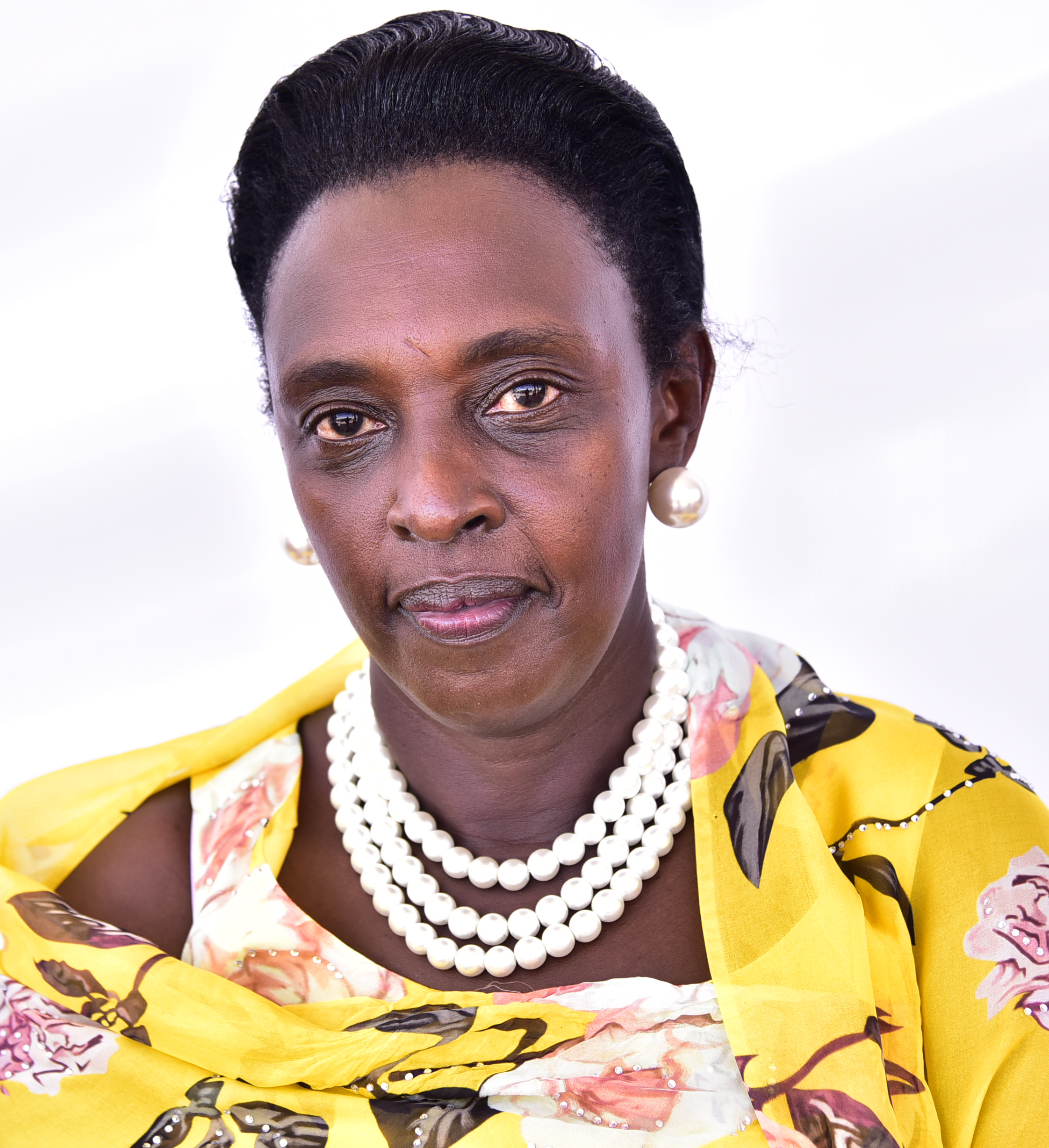
- Born: 17 July 1964 (age 62)
- Citizenship: Ugandan
- Education: Nakasero Primary School; Nabumali High School; Kings College Budo; Makerere University; Law Development Centre; Uganda Management Institute
- Occupations: Lawyer, and legislator
- Employer(s): Ministry of Justice and Constitutional Affairs; Gomba West County; Parliament of Uganda
- Known for: Politics
- Title: Member of Parliament
- Political party: National Resistance Movement (NRM)

Robina Gureme Rwakoojo (born 17 July 1964) is a Ugandan Lawyer, legislator who is currently serving as the representative member of Parliament for Gomba West County in Gomba District in the eleventh parliament of Uganda. She is affiliated to the National Resistance Movement (NRM). She also served in the tenth Parliament of Uganda. She also joined the race for Deputy Speakership in of the 11th parliament of Uganda.

== Early life and education ==
Robina Gureme Rwakoojo was born on 17 July 1964 in an Anglican family. She completed her primary education in 1976 from Nakasero Primary School. She went to Nabumali High School from where she completed her Uganda Certificate of Education in 1980. And from Kings College Budo in 1984, she completed her Uganda Advanced Certificate of Education.

Rwakoojo Gureme Rwakoojo graduated with a bachelor's degree in Law from Makerere University in 1990. She finished her Postgraduate Diploma in Legal Practice from Law Development Centre in 1990 and a Postgraduate Diploma in Public Administration and Management from Uganda Management Institute in 2007.

== Career ==
Robina Gureme Rwakoojo was a Pupil State Attorney for Administrator Generals Department under Ministry of Justice and Constitutional Affairs from 1990 - 1992 and within the same organization, she became the State Attorney from 1992 - 1995. She became the Senior State Attorney for Administrator Generals Department under Ministry of Justice and Constitutional Affairs from 1995 - 1996. And for the Directorate of Legal Advisory Services under Ministry of Justice and Constitutional Affairs, she was ( a Senior State Attorney from 1996 - 1999 and she later became the Principal State Attorney 1999 - 2003).

She became the Principal State Attorney for Directorate of Civil Litigation under Ministry of Justice and Constitutional Affairs from 2003 - 2007. She became the Acting Head, for Directorate of Civil Litigation under the Ministry of Justice and Constitutional Affairs from 2007 - 2008. Rwakoojo became the Acting Director Civil Litigation for Ministry of Justice and Constitutional Affairs from 2008 - 2013. She became the Commissioner Line Ministries for Directorate of Civil Litigation under Ministry of Justice and Constitutional Affairs from 2010 - 2015. In 2016, she won the Seat for being the Representative Member of Parliament for Gomba West County in Gomba District in the tenth Parliament of Uganda. She was re-elected for the same seat in 2021.

She sits on the committee for Appointments, and is Chair of Legal & Parliamentary Affairs in the eleventh parliament of Uganda. She served as the vice-chairperson of the Equal Opportunities Committee in the tenth parliament. She was also appointed to head the select committee by Parliament on the directive of Speaker Rebecca Kadaga which investigated allegations of sexual violence and harassment in schools, universities and tertiary institutions.

In January 2026, she was elected a member of parliament for Gomba West County in Gomba District on the National Resistance Movement (NRM) ticket and appears among members of the 12th Parliament (2026-2031) of Uganda who were sworn in in May 2026

In the 12th parliament, she expressed interest in obtaining the race for the deputy speaker of parliament but waited for guidance and direction from the National Resistance Movement (NRM) leadership, which had to take a final decision which later choose the then incumbent deputy speaker Thomas Tayebwa Bangirana, who now serves as the deputy speaker in the 12th parliament .

On 7 July 2026 Rwakoojo was appointed as the chairperson of the Committee on Legal and Parliamentary Affairs and also appointed as a member of the Committee on Appointments.

== Other contributions ==
some of Robina Gureme Rwakoojo other works and contributions include Sponsoring Football Teams in The Area, Supporting Women SACCOS, Completing of Borehole Project in Mpanda, Kyegonza, Kanoni TC for her people in Gomba West County. She also participated in the investigating of sexual violence and harassment in schools, universities and tertiary institutions. She also participated in the second reading of Constitution Amendment Bill and she voted Yes to it. She has also participated in many court cases

== See also ==
- List of members of the eleventh Parliament of Uganda
- National Resistance Movement
- List of members of the eleventh Parliament of Uganda
- List of members of the tenth Parliament of Uganda
