= Elizabeth Musoke =

Ugandan lawyer and judge

Honorable Elizabeth Musoke

Justice of the Supreme Court of Uganda
- Incumbent
- Assumed office 16 November 2022

Personal details
- Born: Uganda
- Education: Makerere University; Law Development Centre

Elizabeth Musoke is an Ugandan justice of the Supreme Court of Uganda, since November 2022.

== Background and education ==
She was born and educated in Uganda for he pre-university education. She earned a Bachelor of Laws (LLB) degree from Makerere University, the nation's oldest and largest public University. She also obtained a Diploma in Legal Practice, from the Law Development Centre, in Kampala, the country's capital city. She was admitted to the Uganda Bar as a practicing lawyer.

== Career ==
She worked with the ministry of justice for several years and left at the rank of Principal State Attorney to join the Inspectorate of Government as Director Legal Affairs in 1999. In July 2013, she was appointed to serve as a judge of the High Court of Uganda, assigned to the civil division, serving in that capacity until October 2015, when she was elevated to the Court of Appeal, which doubles as the Constitutional Court of Uganda. In November 2022, she was appointed by H.E Yoweri Kaguta Museveni as a Justice of the Supreme Court of Uganda.

== See also ==
- Hellen Abulu Obura
- Judiciary of Uganda
