= Elizabeth Mpagi Bahigeine =

Ugandan lawyer and judge

- Born: 1942 (age 83–84); Uganda
- Citizenship: Uganda
- Education: Makerere University (Bachelor of Laws); Law Development Centre (Diploma in Legal Practice)
- Occupations: Lawyer; judge
- Years active: 1988–2012
- Known for: Law
- Title: Former Deputy Chief Justice of Uganda (2010 to 2012)

Elizabeth Mpagi Bahigeine (née Elizabeth Mpagi), also Elizabeth Alice Mpagi-Bahigeine, is a Ugandan lawyer and judge who, served as the Deputy Chief Justice of Uganda from 2010 until her retirement in 2012. Immediately prior to her appointment as deputy chief justice, she was a Justice of the Court of Appeal of Uganda, which also serves as the Constitutional Court of Uganda.

== Background and education ==
She has a Bachelor of Laws degree, obtained from the University of East Africa, prior to becoming Makerere University. She also holds a Diploma in Legal Practice from the Law Development Center in Kampala, Uganda's capital and largest city. She was born in the Central Region of Uganda in 1942. She attained the mandatory retirement age of 70 years in 2012, when she stepped down from the Court of Appeal.

== Career ==
She was first appointed to the bench in 1988. Her service in the Judiciary of Uganda involved service in the country's high court system, as a Justice of the High Court of Uganda. From there, she was appointed to the Court of Appeal/Constitutional Court in 2010 and retired from the judiciary in 2012, at the age of 70. At the time of her appointment to the position of Deputy Chief Justice (DCJ) in 2010, she was the most-senior justice at the appellate court. In Uganda, the DCJ is the head of the Court of Appeal/Constitutional Court and is not a member of the Supreme Court of Uganda.

== Other considerations ==
In 2010, Justice Mpagi-Bahigeine was a member of the panel of Appellate Court judges who ruled 5–0 to dismiss the treason charges against opposition politician Kizza Besigye, and 10 other co-accused individuals. On her retirement, she spoke against laws that discriminated against women and their ability to procure a divorce.

== See also ==
- Ministry of Justice and Constitutional Affairs (Uganda)
