= Muzamiru Kibeedi Mutangula =

Ugandan lawyer and judge

- Born: 1967 (age 58–59); Uganda
- Citizenship: Uganda
- Education: Makerere University (Bachelor of Laws); Law Development Centre (Diploma in Legal Practice)
- Occupations: Lawyer, judge
- Years active: 1993 — present
- Known for: Law
- Title: Justice of the Uganda Court of Appeal

Muzamiru Kibeedi Mutangula, also Muzamiru Mutangula Kibeedi, is a Ugandan lawyer and judge, who, on 4 October 2019, was nominated to sit on the Uganda Court of Appeal.

== Background and education ==
He graduated from the Faculty of Law of Makerere University, Uganda's largest and oldest public university, with a Bachelor of Laws. He also holds a Diploma in Legal Practice by the Law Development Centre in Kampala, Uganda's capital city.

== Career ==
Prior to his ascension to the bench, Kibeedi was in private legal practice for over 26 years, dating back to 1993. His practice has included Constitutional Rights Enforcement Litigation, Property Development and Taxation Planning, Civil Corporate Defence and Civil Defence of High Net-Worth Individuals.

== See also ==
- Irene Mulyagonja
- Monica Mugenyi
- Ministry of Justice and Constitutional Affairs (Uganda)
