= Peter Nyombi =

Ugandan politician

- Born: 23 April 1954; Nakasongola, Uganda
- Died: 7 October 2018 (aged 64)
- Education: Makerere University (Bachelor of Laws); Law Development Center (Diploma in Legal Practice)
- Occupations: Lawyer, politician
- Years active: 1977–2018
- Known for: Politics
- Title: 1. Former Attorney General; 2. Member of Parliament; "Buruuli County"; Nakasongola District

Peter Nyombi (23 April 1954 – 7 October 2018) was a Ugandan lawyer and politician. He was an Attorney General and member of the Ugandan Cabinet, appointed on 27 May 2011. He replaced Kiddu Makubuya who became Minister for General Duties in the Office of the Prime Minister. In the cabinet reshuffle of 1 March 2015, he was dropped from the cabinet and was replaced by Fred Ruhindi. He was also the elected Member of Parliament for "Buruuli County" in Nakasongola District.

== Background and education ==
Nyombi was born in Nakasongola District, on 23 April 1954, to Eriakimu Kajja, a schoolteacher and Mrs. Kajja, a full-time housewife. Nyombi is one of thirteen siblings, one of his brothers is Professor John Musisi Senyonyi, the Vice Chancellor of Uganda Christian University and another was diplomatic service member Henry Mayega, who was deputy head of mission for the embassy in China. Nyombi attended Nakasongola Primary School followed by Kings College Buddo for his O-Level and A-Level education. In 1973, he was admitted to Makerere University, Uganda's largest and oldest public university, established in 1922. He studied law, graduating in 1976, with a Bachelor of Laws degree. In 1977, he received the Diploma in Legal Practice from the Law Development Centre.

== Career ==
From 1977 until 1986, he worked as a State Attorney in the Department of Public Prosecution in the Ugandan Ministry of Justice. For the next ten years, from 1986 until 1996, he served as counsel in the Office of the Inspector General of Government (IGG). From 1996 until 2001, he worked as the Director of Legal Affairs in the office of the IGG. In 2001, he opened his own legal practice, Nyombi and Company Advocates, which is still operation as of June 2019. Also in 2006, he was elected to the Uganda's Parliament to represent "Buruuli County", Nakasongola District. From May 2011 until March 2015, he served as Uganda's Attorney General. Nyombi represented Nakasongola County in parliament from 2006 to 2016 when he lost his seat to Noah Mutebi. He helped to provide solar panels to maternity wards and health centres, renovate schools and provide boreholes for his constituency. Nyombi provided free legal advice to military veterans seeking compensation from the government and to constituents involved in land disputes.

== Controversy ==
In August 2013 the Uganda Law Society, an industry association suspended Nyombi from membership, citing three controversial opinions that he had rendered, opinions that contravened conventional legal understanding:

1. He advised Rebecca Kadaga, the Speaker of Parliament, that three MPs expelled by their political party, the National Resistance Movement, could keep their parliamentary seats.
2. He advised the President, Yoweri Museveni, that it was Constitutional for General Aronda Nyakairima, an actively serving officer in the Uganda People's Defence Force to serve in the Ugandan Cabinet, as Minister of Internal Affairs.
3. He advised the President that the former Chief Justice of Uganda, Justice Benjamin Odoki, who had attained the mandatory retirement age of 70 years, could continue to serve on the bench beyond the age of 70, as stipulated in the constitution.

The society issued Nyombi with a "certificate of incompetence" after a vote by its members during an extraordinary meeting which Nyombi chose not to attend. The suspension was to have lasted two years but Nyombi successfully fought to have it quashed in the Uganda High Court in December 2014.

== Personal life ==
Nyombi was married and father to four children. He was a devout Christian.

== Death ==
Nyombi suffered from hypertension and died of heart failure at the SAS Clinic in Kampala on 7 October 2018, having been rushed in with breathing difficulties.

== See also ==
- Cabinet of Uganda
- Parliament of Uganda
- Nakasongola District
