= Stephen Musota =

Ugandan lawyer and judge

Honorable Stephen Musota
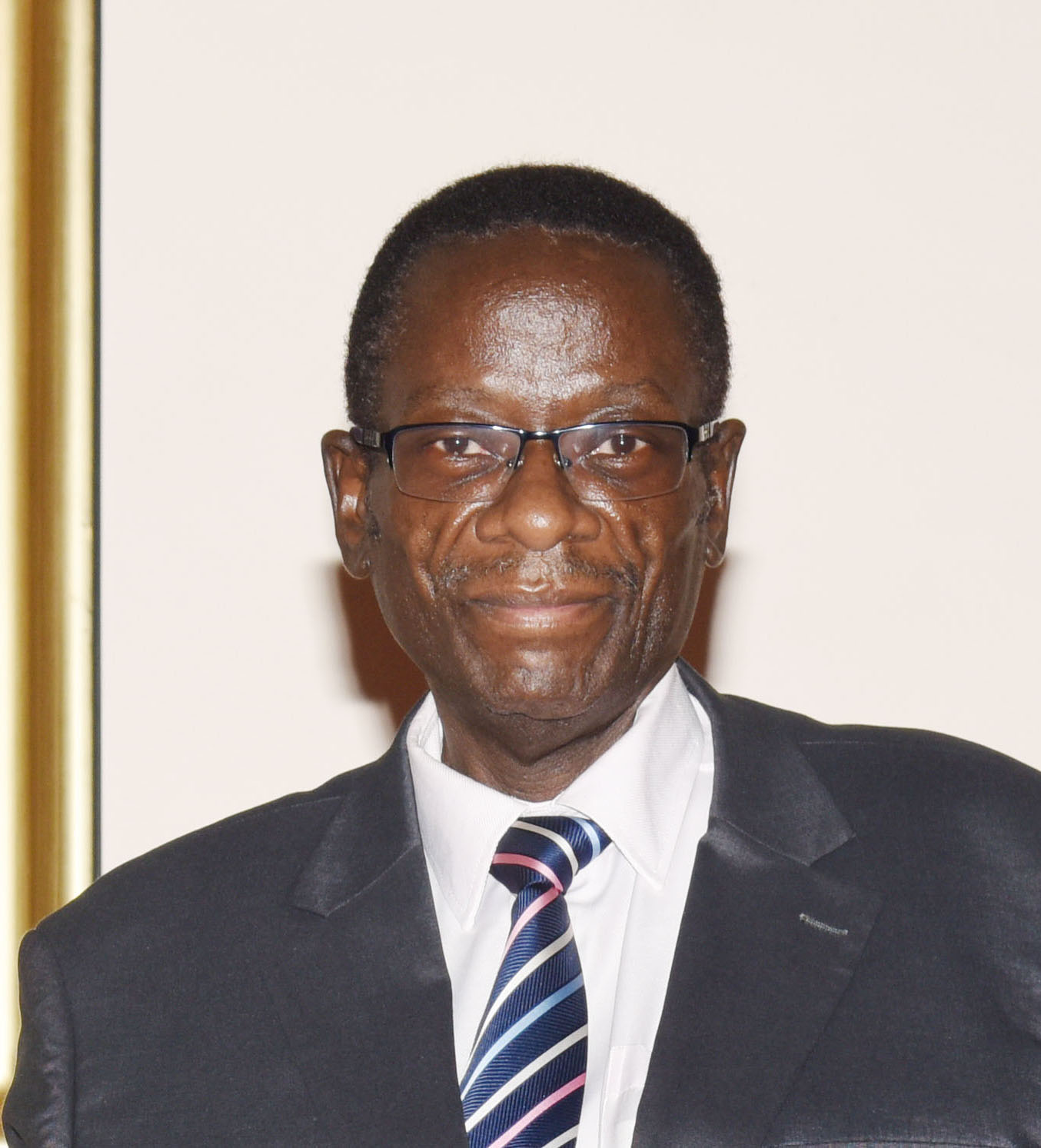
- Born: 1959 (age 66–67); Uganda
- Education: Makerere University (Bachelor of Laws); Law Development Centre (Diploma in Legal Practice)
- Occupations: Lawyer, judge
- Years active: 1984 — present
- Known for: Law
- Title: Justice of the Supreme Court of Uganda

Stephen Musota is an Ugandan lawyer and judge, in the Supreme Court of Uganda, The Supreme Court is the highest Court in the country. Justice Stephen Musota was appointed to the Supreme Court bench in November 2022 By The president of the Republic Of Uganda and was appointed by the Hon the Chief justice of uganda in January 2023 as the new Chief Inspector Of Courts Of Judicature . He was appointed to the court of appeal on 8 February 2018.

== Background and education ==
He was born in Uganda, circa 1959. He studied law at Makerere University, Uganda's largest and oldest public university, graduating in 1982 with a Bachelor of Laws (LLB) degree. The next year, he received a Diploma in Legal Practice, from the Law Development Centre, in Kampala, the national capital. He was then admitted to the Uganda Bar.

== Work experience ==
In 1984, he was appointed as a Magistrate Grade One, rising to the level of Senior Principal Magistrate Grade One in 1992. He went on to work as Chief Magistrate, then as Deputy Registrar and then Registrar of the High Court.

Later in 2000, he was promoted to the position of chief registrar of the Judiciary, serving in that capacity until 2004. In 2004 he was appointed to the bench, as a member of the High Court of Uganda. He has special interest in Civil Law.

== Judicial career ==
He was appointed as a judge of the High Court of Uganda in 2004. He served as the head of the civil division of the high court. In February 2018, Musota was appointed to the Uganda Court of Appeal, and was successfully vetted by the Ugandan parliament.

== Other considerations ==
Stephen Musota served on the Task Force on the Reforms of Criminal and Civil Laws in 2015, to which he was appointed by the Chief Justice of Uganda. In 2016, he was appointed to the Case Backlog Reduction Committee of the Uganda Judiciary. In 2017, he was appointed as a member of the Committee on Reform of Legislation on Civil Procedures in Uganda.

== See also ==
- Supreme Court of Uganda
- Constitutional Court of Uganda
- High Court
- Chief Magistrate Courts
- Magistrate Grade 1
