= Stella Arach-Amoko =

Ugandan lawyer and judge (1953–2023)

- Born: Mary Stella Arach-Amoko; 16 April 1954; Protectorate of Uganda
- Died: 17 June 2023 (aged 69); Kampala, Uganda
- Education: Makerere University (LLB); Law Development Centre (Diploma in Legal Practice)
- Occupations: Lawyer, judge
- Years active: 1979–2023
- Known for: Law
- Title: Justice of the Supreme Court of Uganda

Mary Stella Arach-Amoko (16 April 1954 – 17 June 2023) was a Ugandan judge who served as a justice of the Supreme Court of Uganda from 20 June 2013 to 17 June 2023.

== Career ==
Arach-Amoko served in the Uganda Attorney General's Chambers from 1979 to 1997, rising from state attorney to commissioner for civil litigation. In 1997, she was appointed a High Court judge and served in that capacity until 2010.

Arach-Amoko served at the East African Court of Justice as a judge from 2006 until 2008, and from 2008 until 2013, as a deputy principal judge of the First Instance Division. In 2010, she was one of the candidates considered by the Judicial Services Commission, for appointment as the chief justice of Uganda.

Between 15 April 2018 and 14 April 2020, Arach-Amoko served as the chairperson of the nine-member management committee of Uganda's Law Development Centre. In 2010 she was appointed to the Court of Appeal of Uganda.

In her career on the bench, Arach-Amoko had handled many election cases. In 2006, she dismissed the petition in which the National Resistance Movement’s Francis Babu had challenged Erias Lukwago’s victory as member of Parliament for Kampala Central Division. In 2012, at the Court of Appeal, she wrote the majority opinion that nullified NRM's Faisal Kikulukunyu's victory as the member of Parliament for Butambala County. The ruling benefited Muhammad Muwanga Kivumbi of the Democratic Party.

== Personal life and death ==
Arach-Amoko was married to Ambassador Idule Amoko who, as of April 2019, was serving as the Deputy Head of Mission at the Uganda Embassy in Addis Ababa, Ethiopia.

Stella Arach-Amoko died in Kampala on 17 June 2023, at the age of 69. She is survived by four children; Yossa Annette, Emmanuel Komakech, Jackie Amony and Ivy Amoko.

== See also ==
- Judiciary of Uganda
