= Christopher Izama Madrama =

Ugandan lawyer and judge

Honorable Christopher Madrama
- Born: 1962 (age 63–64); Uganda
- Citizenship: Uganda
- Education: Makerere University (Bachelor of Laws); Law Development Centre (Diploma in Legal Practice); University of Zimbabwe (Master of Laws in Women's Law)
- Occupations: Lawyer, judge
- Years active: 1990 — present
- Known for: Law
- Title: Justice of the Supreme Court of Uganda

Christopher Izama Madrama is a Ugandan lawyer and judge, on the Supreme Court of Uganda,. He was appointed to the Supreme court on 31 October 2022.

== Background and education ==
He was born in Uganda, circa 1962. He studied law at Makerere University, Uganda's largest and oldest public university, graduating in 1989 with a Bachelor of Laws (LLB) degree. The next year, he received a Diploma in Legal Practice, from the Law Development Centre, in Kampala, the national capital. He was then admitted to the Uganda Bar. Later, he obtained a Master of Laws degree in Women's Law, from the University of Zimbabwe.

== Work experience ==
In 1990, he took up employment as a state attorney, in the Uganda Ministry of Justice and Constitutional Affairs, working in that capacity until 1999. He was then elevated to Principal State Attorney.

Later in 1999, he left the Justice ministry and joined the Law Development Centre as a Senior Legal Officer. From 2001 until 2010, Christopher Madrama was a Principal Legal Associate at Katende Ssempebwa and Company Advocates, a large firm in the city of Kampala, Uganda's capital. This was his last job in the private sector, prior to joining the bench.

== Judicial career ==
He was appointed as a judge of the High Court of Uganda in June 2010. Over the years, he served in the various divisions of the high curt, including the commercial division and the executions division. In February 2018, Madrama was appointed to the Uganda Court of Appeal, and was successfully vetted by the Ugandan parliament.

== Other considerations ==
Christopher Madrama has authored several publications including; "The Problem HIV/AIDS: A Discourse on Laws, Marriage and the Subordinate Status of Women in Uganda". From 1994 until 1995, he served as a research assistant with the Commission of Inquiry into the Judiciary of Uganda.

== See also ==
- Supreme Court of Uganda
- Constitutional Court of Uganda
