= Geoffrey Kiryabwire =

Ugandan judge (born 1962)

- Born: 1962 (age 63–64); Uganda
- Citizenship: Uganda
- Education: Makerere University (Bachelor of Laws); Law Development Centre (Diploma in Legal Practice); University of London (Master of Laws)
- Occupations: Lawyer, judge
- Years active: since 1985
- Known for: Law
- Title: Justice of the Court of Appeal of Uganda
- Spouse: Winifred Tarinyeba Kiryabwire
- Family: Mary Kirabo Kiryabwire - daughter
- Website: Homepage

Geoffrey Wilfred Mupere Kiryabwire (born 1962) is a Ugandan judge and a justice of the Court of Appeal of Uganda, since May 2013. Prior to that, he served as a judge of the Commercial Division of the High Court of Uganda, serving as the head of the division, since 2003.

== Background and education ==
He was born circa 1962 to Jovan Kiryabwire and Mary Kiryabwire. His father was the first indigenous Ugandan to qualify as a neurosurgeon, and his mother is a retired nurse.

He attended Nabumali High School from 1974 to 1978 for his O-Level education, before he transferred to Kings College Budo for his A-Level studies from 1979 to 1980. In 1984, he graduated from Makerere University with a Bachelor of Laws degree. Later in 1984, he graduated from the Law Development Centre with a Diploma in Legal Practice. He also holds the a Master of Laws degree awarded by the University of London in 1990.

== Career ==
From 1991 until 1992, he served as a legal assistant to the Minister of Justice & Attorney General of Uganda. From 1992 until 1994, he served as a senior state attorney for civil litigation in the Office of the Solicitor General of Uganda. From 1993 until 1999, he served as the company secretary and legal counsel at Pan World Insurance Company Limited (PWICO). Between 1999 and 2003, he was the acting general manager and chief executive officer at PWICO. He was appointed as a judge in the Commercial Division of the High Court of Uganda in 2003, a position he still occupies.

During his legal career, he has been a participant in four national commissions of inquiry:

- Lead counsel to the commission of inquiry into the rash of bank failures in Uganda in the late 1990s and early 2000s.
- Member of the commission of inquiry into the purchase of "junk helicopters" by the Uganda People's Defence Force during the 1990s.
- Secretary to the Porter Commission (1993-1995) that inquired into mismanagement of criminal cases in Uganda.
- Secretary to the commission of inquiry into allegations of corruption in the Uganda Revenue Authority.

== Personal life ==
Kiryabwire is a married father. He and his wife Winifred Kiryabwire are the parents of daughter Mary Kirabo Kiryabwire.

In 2009, Kiryabwire and his siblings established the Jovan and Mary Kiryabwire Charitable Foundation (JMKF). The first task of the foundation was to renovate the neurosurgical ward at the Mulago National Referral Hospital, where Jovan Kiryabwire worked. Then the foundation established an award to be given annually to the best resident in neurosurgery at the Makerere University College of Health Sciences. Future assistance will be directed at helping the disadvantaged children in the Pallisa District.

== See also ==
- Government of Uganda
- Uganda Law Society
- Constitutional Court of Uganda
- Supreme Court of Uganda
