= Esta Nambayo =

- Born: 1968 (age 57–58); Busia District, Uganda
- Citizenship: Ugandan
- Education: Makerere University (Bachelor of Laws); Law Development Centre (Diploma in Legal Practice); Uganda Management Institute (Master of Public Administration)
- Occupations: Lawyer and judge
- Years active: 1998 — present
- Known for: The law
- Title: Justice of the Uganda High Court

Esta Nambayo is a Ugandan lawyer and judge who was appointed to the High Court of Uganda on 4 October 2019. And is now a Justice of the Court of Appeal of Uganda.

Before that, from 27 August 2018 until 4 October 2019, she served as the Chief Registrar of the Courts of Judicature in Uganda. In that position, she was the fifth-highest judicial officer in the country, behind the Chief Justice Deputy Chief Justice Principal Judge and the (4) Secretary to the Judiciary.

== Background and education ==
Nambayo was born in Busia District, circa 1968. She attended local primary schools before she enrolled in Tororo Girls School for her O-Level education. She studied at Mackay Memorial College, in Nateete, a Kampala neighborhood, for her A-Level studies.

She was admitted to Makerere University, where she studied law; graduating with a Bachelor of Laws degree. She then obtained a Diploma in Legal Practice, from the Law Development Centre, in Kampala, the capital city of Uganda. Later, she was awarded a Master's degree in Management, from Uganda Management Institute.

== Career ==
She started out in the 1990s, as a legal officer with the International Federation of Women Lawyers (FIDA), in their Kampala office. She joined the bench as a Grade One Magistrate, serving in that capacity in the courts in Luweero, Nakasongola and Kampala City Hall. Furthermore, she was then transferred to Mbarara at the rank of Chief Magistrate. While there, she concurrently served as the Deputy Registrar of the Mbarara Court.

From Mbarara, she served as Chief Magistrate, at the courts in Mengo, Nakawa and Makindye, all in Kampala. At the same time, she concurrently served as the Assistant Registrar of the Land Division. She has also previously worked as the deputy registrar at the High Court, Land Division, Commercial Division, and Court of Appeal (Constitutional Court).

Immediately prior to her current assignment, she was the Registrar of the Court of Appeal (Constitutional Court). As Chief Registrar, she replaced Paul Gadenya, who was, earlier in 2018, appointed to the High Court as a judge.

== Other considerations ==
Justice Nambayo was the presiding judge in the case State vs Adam Suleiman Kalungi, where Kalungi was accused of killing the former Member of Parliament for Butaleja District Women's Constituency, the late Cerinah Nebanda. She convicted him to four years in prison, after finding him guilty of manslaughter, but the sentence was overturned by the High Court of Uganda.

== Family ==
Esta Nambayo is a married mother with two children.

== See also ==
- High Court of Uganda
- Court of Appeal of Uganda
- Supreme Court of Uganda
