= Remmy Kasule =

Ugandan lawyer and judge (born 1949)

Honorable Remmy Kasule

Justice of the Court of Appeal of Uganda

Personal details
- Born: 1949 (age 76–77) Central Region, Uganda
- Education: Makerere University; Law Development Centre

Remegious Kyonooneka Kasule (born 1949), commonly Remmy Kasule, is a Ugandan lawyer and judge, who serves as a member of the Court of Appeal of Uganda.

== Background and education ==
Kasule was born in 1949, in Central Region, Uganda. He attended Ugandan schools for his primary and secondary school education. He was admitted to Makerere University, graduating with a Bachelor of Laws (LLB) degree, as part of the inaugural class at Makerere. Later, he obtained a Diploma in Legal Practice, from the Law Development Centre, in Kampala.

== Career ==
Before being called to the bench, Remmy Kasule was a politician and a member of the Democratic Party (Uganda). He was defeated by the late John Zimula Mugwanya for a position on the Constituent Assembly (CA), which framed the 1995 Constitution. After that loss he concentrated on his private law practice, rising to prominence as a criminal defense attorney, and was given the designation of Senior Counsel, by the Uganda Law Council.

In 2004, Kasule was appointed to the High Court of Uganda, serving in the Kampala circuit until 2007, and in Gulu circuit from 2007 until 2011. In 2011, he was elevated to the Uganda Court of Appeal. While there, he wrote the minority opinion in a landmark case where the Constitutional Court of Uganda, ruled 3 to 2 to eject the "Rebel MPs" from the Ugandan Parliament after the National Resistance Movement political party kicked them out of the party. Justice Kasule was vindicated when on appeal, the Supreme Court of Uganda, agreed 6 to 1 with him, that the members of parliament should retain their seats in parliament.

== Other considerations ==
Justice Remmy Kasule concurrently serves as chairman of the Uganda Law Council. He served in the past as the chairperson of the disciplinary committee of the Law Council. He is also a former president of the Uganda Law Society. He previously served as a commissioner of the Judicial Service Commission.

== See also ==
- Judiciary of Uganda
- Supreme Court of Uganda
