= Laeticia Kikonyogo =

Ugandan lawyer and judge

- Born: September 2, 1940; Uganda
- Died: November 23, 2017 (aged 77); Makerere University School of Medicine, Mulago, Kampala
- Education: Makerere University (Bachelor of Arts); Somerville College, Oxford (Diploma in Social Anthropology); Inner Temple (Bachelor of Laws); Council of Legal Education (Called to the Bar)
- Occupations: Lawyer, Academic, Judge
- Known for: The Law

Laetitia Eulalia Mary Mukasa Kikonyogo (2 September 1940 – 23 November 2017), was a Ugandan lawyer and judge. Prior to her retirement from the bench, she was a member of the Court of Appeal of Uganda, which also doubles as Uganda's Constitutional Court. While there, she served at the rank of Deputy Chief Justice of Uganda. Her first name is sometimes spelled as Leticia or as Letitia.

== Overview ==
As Deputy Chief Justice of Uganda, Justice Kikonyogo was rated the 6th most powerful person in Ugandan public life. The six (6) most important public officials in Uganda are:

1. The President – Currently, Yoweri Museveni
2. The Vice President – Currently, Edward Ssekandi
3. The Speaker of Parliament – Currently, Rebecca Kadaga
4. The Chief Justice – Currently, Bart Magunda Katureebe
5. The Deputy Speaker of Parliament – Currently, Jacob Oulanyah
6. The Deputy Chief Justice – Currently, Alfonse Chigamoy Owiny-Dollo.

She held various positions of responsibility in both the Catholic Church and the Judiciary. She was the first Uganda woman magistrate Grade I in 1971–1973; the first woman Chief Magistrate between 1973 and 1986; the first woman to be appointed High Court judge in 1986 and also sat on the Court of Appeal.

She was later appointed the first woman Deputy Chief Justice of Uganda. In the Catholic Church, she was appointed as a Papal Dame by Pope Benedict XVI. She was one of the first ever women papal knights in the history of the Catholic Church in Africa.

When she returned from the United Kingdom after her studies overseas, she lectured, for some time, at the "Institute of Public Administration", the precursor of Uganda Management Institute in Kampala.

== Education ==
She attended Busuubizi Girls’ Primary School, in present-day Mityana District, from 1948 until 1952. She then transferred to Trinity College Nabbingo for her O-Level studies, from 1953 until 1958. She completed her high school education at King's College Budo, where she studied from 1959 until 1960, and passed her final A-Level examinations.

In 1964 she joined Makerere University, graduating in 1968 with a Bachelor of Arts (BA) degree. At that time, Makerere was a constituent college of the University of London. She proceeded to the United Kingdom for a master's degree in Sociology and Social Anthropology. However, after one year at Somerville College, Oxford, she graduated with a Diploma in Social Anthropology.

She studied at the Inner Temple, graduating with a Bachelor of Laws degree. She continued her education at the Council of Legal Education and was called to the Bar in England in 1968.

== Death ==
Justice Kikonyogo died on 23 November 2017 of an apparent heart attack while being rushed to the hospital. At the time of her death, she was 77 years old. Joseph Kyagulanyi Kikonyongo, the husband of the deceased said that his wife had never suffered from anything like high blood pressure. According to the husband, Justice Kikonyogo had been sick for more than five years prior to her death and had been under constant surveillance and treatment for parkinsonism.

== Other considerations ==
Laeticia Kikonyogo was the first Ugandan woman to serve as Grade 1 magistrate, from 1971 until 1973. She was the first woman in the country to serve as the Chief Magistrate between 1973 and 1986. She was appointed to the Uganda High Court in 1986, being the first woman to serve in that capacity. Later, when she was appointed to the Uganda Court of Appeal and Constitutional Court, she was the first woman to serve in that capacity. Later, she served as the first woman Deputy Chief Justice of Uganda.

== See also ==
- Judiciary of Uganda
