= Percy Tuhaise =

Ugandan lawyer and judge

- Born: 1960 (age 65–66); Uganda
- Citizenship: Uganda
- Education: Makerere University (Bachelor of Laws) (Master of Laws); Law Development Centre (Diploma in Legal Practice)
- Occupations: Lawyer, judge
- Years active: 1986 — present
- Known for: Law
- Title: Justice of the Court of Appeal of Uganda

Percy Night Tuhaise, is a Ugandan lawyer and judge who, on 8 February 2018, was appointed by president Yoweri Museveni, to the Uganda Court of Appeal which also doubles as the country's Constitutional Court. Prior to her current position she served on the High Court of Uganda.

== Background and education ==
She graduated from the Faculty of Law of Makerere University, Uganda's largest and oldest public university, with a Bachelor of Laws, circa 1983. The following year, she was awarded a Diploma in Legal Practice by the Law Development Centre, in Kampala, Uganda's capital city. She also holds a Master of Laws from Makerere University.

== Career ==
After her admission to the Uganda Bar, she served in various roles in and outside public service. She was a member of the Uganda Law Reform Commission. At the time of her appointment to the Uganda High Court, she was the deputy director of the Law Development Centre, in Kampala, and concurrently served as the vice-chairperson of the electricity disputes tribunal. At the High Court, Justice Tuhaise has served in the Family Division and in the International Crimes Division.

Tuhaise participated in translating of the 1995 Constitution into Runyoro/Rutooro under supervision of the Law Development Centre. She was one of the trial judges in the "Muslim Clerics’ Murder Trial", between 2016 and 2017. She is the author of several publications, in peer-reviewed fora.

== Other consideration ==
On 7 February 2018, president Yoweri Museveni appointed Percy Tuhaise to the Uganda Court of Appeal/Uganda Constitutional Court, pending parliamentary approval.

== See also ==
- Ministry of Justice and Constitutional Affairs (Uganda)
