= Jovan Kiryabwire =

Ugandan neurosurgeon (1928-2004)

- Born: 28 October 1928; Butebo County, Pallisa District, Uganda
- Died: 17 January 2004 (aged 75); Mulago National Referral Hospital
- Citizenship: Uganda
- Education: Butebo Primary School; Kamuge Primary School
- Alma mater: Nabumali High School (High School Diploma); Makerere University (Bachelor of Medicine and Bachelor of Surgery); Royal College of Surgeons of England (Fellow of the Royal College of Surgeons of England); Royal College of Surgeons of Edinburgh (Fellow of the Royal College of Surgeons of Edinburgh)
- Occupation: Neurosurgeon
- Years active: 1972—2000
- Title: Former Professor and Head of Neurosurgery at Makerere University School of Medicine & Mulago National Referral Hospital
- Spouse: Mary Aligaweesa Kiryabwire

Jovan William Mabudo Kiryabwire (28 October 1928 – 17 January 2004) was a Ugandan neurosurgeon, who served as a consultant neurosurgeon at Mulago National Referral Hospital. He concurrently served as a Professor and Head of the Department of Neurosurgery at Makerere University School of Medicine. He died in January 2004 from stomach cancer. He is reported to be the first indigenous African to qualify as neurosurgeon in the countries of East and Central Africa.

== Background and education ==
He was born on 28 October 1928, in Butebo county, Pallisa District, in the Eastern Region of Uganda. He attended Butebo Primary School followed by Kamuge Primary School. He then transferred to Nabumali High School outside the city of Mbale, where he obtained the equivalent of a high school diploma.

In 1952, he was admitted to Makerere University Medical School. He graduated in 1957 with a Bachelor of Medicine and Bachelor of Surgery. Later he studied in England and Scotland, earning both the Fellow of the Royal College of Surgeons of England (FRCS) and the Fellow of the Royal College of Surgeons of Edinburgh, the FRCS(Ed).

== Career ==
He is credited with establishing the first neurosurgical unit in Uganda. At his funeral, colleagues, former students and fellow medical administrators testified as to his competence, dedication and honesty. During the 1970s and the 1980s, he turned down lucrative employment opportunities outside Uganda and stayed behind to serve "his people", despite the challenges. He attended to neurosurgical referrals from within Uganda and neighboring countries.

== Personal ==
Professor Kiryabwire was survived by a widow, Mary Aligaweesa Kiryabwire and nine adult children. His offspring include Joel Kiryabwire, a neurosurgeon and Geoffrey Kiryabwire, a Justice of the Uganda Court of Appeal. Other offspring include another medical doctor, another lawyer, a veterinarian, two engineers, a nurse and one school teacher.

== Illness and death ==
He died on 17 January 2004 at the age of 75 from cancer of the stomach. The Uganda government gave him an "official funeral".

== Honours ==
While still alive, the Uganda government decorated him with the Uganda Independence Medical Medical, for his service to his country. He was also a Commander (Brother) of the Order of St John and was knighted in 1991.

== See also ==
- Sebastian Kyalwazi
- Francis Omaswa
