= Keturah Katunguka =

Ugandan lawyer and judge

- Born: Uganda
- Citizenship: Uganda
- Education: Makerere University (Bachelor of Laws); Law Development Centre (Diploma in Legal Practice)
- Occupations: Lawyer, judge
- Years active: 1997 — present
- Known for: Law
- Title: Justice of the High Court of Uganda

Keturah Kitariisibwa Katunguka, (nee Keturah Kitariisibwa), also Ketrah Katunguka, is a Ugandan lawyer and judge who serves as a justice of the High Court of Uganda, since 11 March 2016.

== Background and education ==
She was born in Uganda and attended local schools for her primary and secondary education. She has a Bachelor of Laws degree, from Makerere University, Uganda's oldest and largest public university. She also holds a Diploma in Legal Practice, awarded by the Law Development Centre in Kampala, the national capital and largest city in the country.

== Career ==
Prior to her appointment to the high court, she was an officer in the Uganda Ministry of Justice and Constitutional Affairs. In 2016, following her appointment to the high court, she was assigned to the Land Division of the court.

== Other considerations ==
Ms. Katunguka has been involved in several public investigations, tribunals and commissions of inquiry, including the following: (a) In 2007, she served as the registrar of the Electricity Disputes Tribunal, an organ of the Judiciary of Uganda. (b) In 2010, she was appointed as the Secretary of the judicial commission established to investigate the alleged misuse of funds in the Universal Primary Education (UPE) and Universal Secondary Education (USE) government programmes. That commission's work was terminated by parliament, before the commission finished its work, because the investigation was using up too much of the national resources. In 2016, she was appointed as the vice chairperson of the nine-member Makerere University Visitation Committee, to inquire into the affairs of the University. The report of that committee was made public on 29 December 2017.

== See also ==
- Julia Sebutinde
- Catherine Bamugemereire
