= Winifred Kiryabwire =

Ugandan lawyer, academic and businesswoman

- Born: c. 1976 (age 49–50); Uganda
- Citizenship: Uganda
- Education: Makerere University (Bachelor of Laws); Law Development Centre (Diploma in Legal Practice); University of Cambridge (Master of Laws); Stanford University (Master of Science of Law) (Doctor of Science of Law)
- Occupations: Associate Professor, Makerere University School of Law, Lawyer, Academic & Businesswoman
- Years active: 2000–present
- Known for: Legal matters
- Title: Chairperson of DFCU Bank and Associate Professor of Law at Makerere University

Winifred Mary Tarinyeba Kiryabwire (born c. 1976), (née: Winifred Mary Tarinyeba), is a Ugandan lawyer, academic and businesswoman who is the chairperson of DFCU Bank, a large commercial bank in Uganda. She was appointed to that position effective 1 April 2022.

== Early life and education ==
She is Ugandan by birth. She attended local primary and secondary schools. Her first degree, a Bachelor of Laws, was obtained from Makerere University, the oldest and largest public university in Uganda. She went on to obtain the Diploma in Legal Practice, from the Law Development Centre, in Kampala, the capital and largest city in that country. Her second degree, a Master of Laws, was awarded by the University of Cambridge in the United Kingdom. She has two more degrees; one is the Master of Science of Law and the other is the Doctor of Science of Law, both awarded by Stanford Law School, in the United States.

== Career ==
As of April 2022, Kiryabwire has over 20 years of legal and business experience. She is an associate professor at Makerere University School of Law. She also serves as a non-executive director at DFCU Bank.

She has previously served as a member of the board of directors of Makerere University Holdings Limited, the business arm of the university. She was a member of the International Ethics Standards Board for Accountants (IESBA). She was the founding chairperson of the Women Business Advisory Council at DFCU Bank, from where she joined the bank's board as a non-executive director. In September 2025, she was appointed to the Advisory Board of the Centre for Business Law and Practice (CBLP) at the University of Leeds in the United Kingdom.

== Personal life ==
Winifred Kiryabwire is married to Justice Geoffrey Kiryabwire of the Court of Appeal of Uganda. Together they are the parents of one daughter, Mary Kirabo Kiryabwire.

== See also ==
- Sylvia Tamale
- Agnes Tibayeita Isharaza
