= Flavian Zeija =

Chief Justice of Uganda

Chief Justice Flavian Zeija
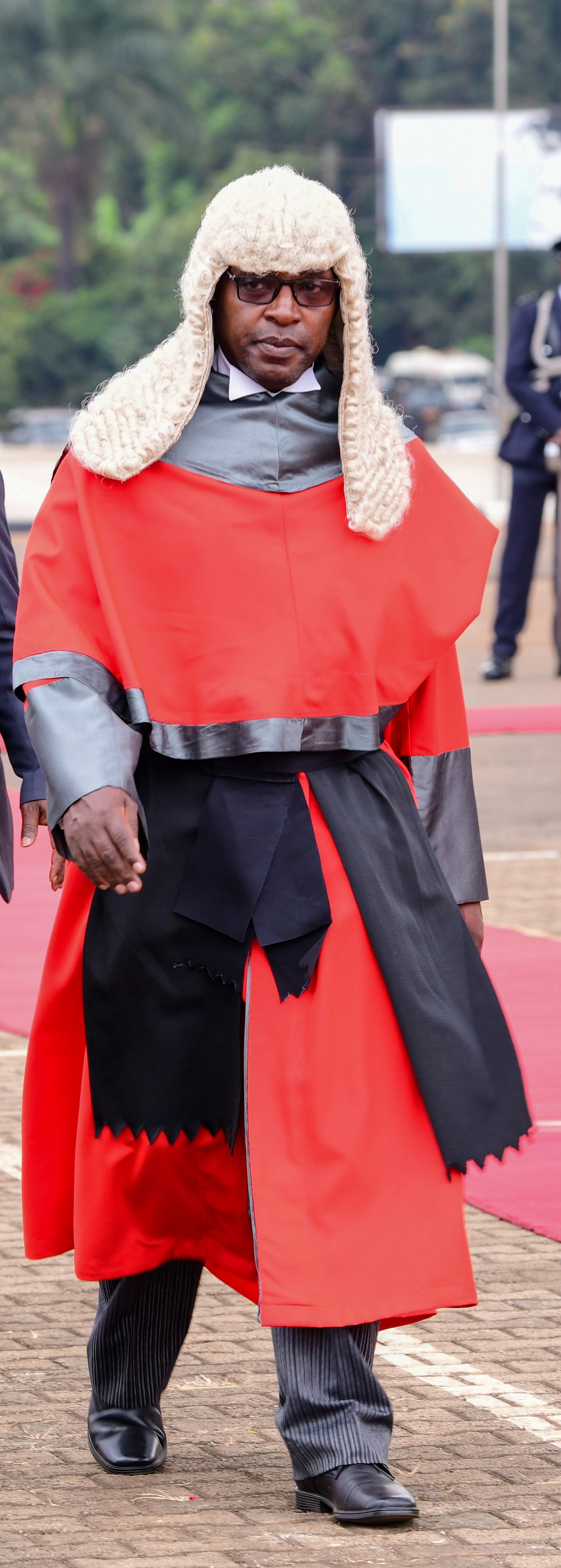
- File: Flavian Zeija, the chief justice of Uganda
- Born: February 18, 1969 (age 57); Uganda
- Education: Makerere University (Bachelor of Laws) (Master of Laws); Law Development Centre (Diploma in Legal Practice); Uganda Martyrs University (Master of Business Administration); University of Dar es Salaam (Doctor of Philosophy in Law)
- Occupation: Chief Justice of Uganda
- Years active: 1998 — present
- Known for: Law
- Title: Chief Justice Supreme Court of Uganda
- Predecessor: Alfonse Owiny-Dollo

Flavian Zeija (born 18 February 1969) is a Ugandan lawyer, judge, academic and judicial administrator who has served as the Chief Justice of Uganda since January 2026. He previously served as the Deputy Chief Justice of Uganda from 2025 to 2026 and as a Principle Judge of Uganda from 2019 to 2025. Before his elevation to the leadership of the judiciary, he served as a judge of the High Court of Uganda.

== Early life and education ==
Zeija was born on 18 February 1969 in Uganda. He attended St. Mary's College Rushoroza for his secondary education. He graduated from Makerere University, the oldest and largest public university in Uganda, with a Bachelor of Laws degree in 1997. He obtained a Postgraduate Diploma in Legal Practice from the Law Development Centre from Makerere University, a Masters of Business Administration from the Uganda Martyrs University, graduated with a Master of Laws degree from Makerere University in 2002 and a Doctor of Philosophy in Law, from the University of Dar es Salaam in 2013.

== Work experience ==
Before joining the bench, Zeija worked in private legal practice, starting as a legal assistant in 1998 with Kwesigabo, Bamwine, Walubiri & Company Advocates, a Kampala-based law firm. In the past, he worked at Tropical Africa Bank as manager legal and recovery, between 2002 and 2003. He also worked at FINCA Uganda Limited as legal counsel. At the time he was appointed to the High Court of Uganda, he served as the managing partner at Zeija, Mukasa & Company Advocates, another Kampala-based law firm.

He also taught law at several Ugandan Universities, including Uganda Christian University, Makerere University and Makerere University Business School (MUBS) in the department of Business Law.

== Judicial career ==
In 2016, Zeija was appointed a judge of the High Court of Uganda. He later served as a resident Judge of Mbarara High Court Circuit.

In December 2019, he was appointed Principal Judge of Uganda, becoming the head of the High Court and supervisor of subordinate courts.

In January 2026, Flavian Zeija was appointed Chief Justice of Uganda by President Yoweri Kaguta Museveni, following the retirement of Alfonse Owiny-Dollo. He was sworn into office on 25 January 2026.

== Notable judgments ==
The Principal Judge, may at his/her discretion, continue to hear cases, in his/her capacity as a justice of the High Court of Uganda. A notable case that he handled in September 2020 was Kalemera H. Kimera vs Kabaka Muwenda Mutebi II. In his dismissal of the suit, the judge said that according to current Ugandan inheritance laws, a grandchild who is not expressly named in the will cannot contest the inheritance of a grandparent's estate. Those who can contest are (a) the legitimate children of the deceased (b) the illegitimate children and (c) any adopted children of the deceased. The judge ordered the complainant to pay the respondents' legal fees.

== Family ==
Justice Flavian Zeija is the father of five children.

== See also ==
- Moses Kawumi Kazibwe
- Alfonse Owiny-Dollo
- Richard Buteera
- Sarah Langa Siu
- Chief Justice of Uganda
- Judiciary of Uganda

Preceded by Yorokamu Bamwine (2010 - 2019)	Principal Judge of Uganda; 2019 – present	Succeeded by Incumbent
