= Alfonse Owiny-Dollo =

Former Chief Justice of Uganda

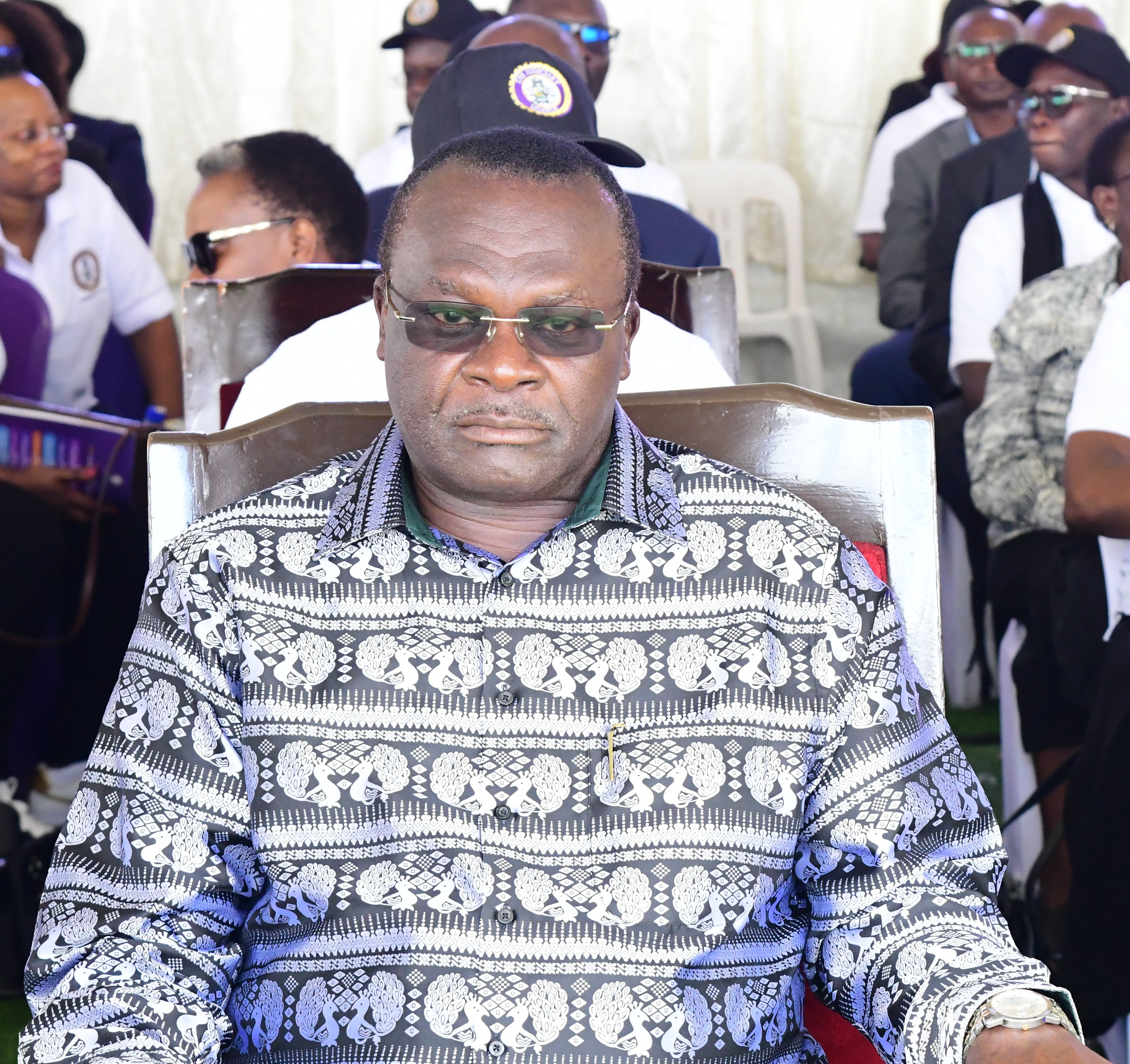
- Former Chief Justice of Uganda

Chief Justice of Uganda
- In office 20 August 2020 – 25 January 2026
- Preceded by: Bart Magunda Katureebe
- Succeeded by: Flavian Zeija

Personal details
- Born: 18 January 1956 (age 70) Agago, Uganda
- Citizenship: Uganda
- Spouse: Florence Nakachwa
- Education: Makerere University (Bachelor of Laws); Law Development Centre (Diploma in Legal Practice); University of Bradford (Master of Arts); Center for Conflict Resolution, Cape Town; Certificate in Advanced Mediation Skills
- Occupation: Lawyer, judge
- Known for: Law

Alfonse Chigamoy Owiny-Dollo (born 18 January 1956) is a Ugandan lawyer and jurist that served as Chief Justice of Uganda from 20 August 2020 until 18 January 2026 when he clocked the mandatory retirement age of 70 years.

He served as the Acting Chief Justice of Uganda from 22 June 2020 and was a deputy Chief Justice from 30 September 2017. He had been appointed to that position in August 2017, replacing Steven Kavuma, who attained the mandatory retirement age of 70 years on 29 September 2017.

== Background and education ==
He was born on 18 January 1956 in present-day Agago District. He attended King's College, Budo and Nabumali High School for his O’Level and A’Level education respectively. He holds a Bachelor of Laws from Makerere University and a Diploma in Legal Practice, from the Law Development Centre in Kampala, Uganda's largest city and capital. His Master of Arts in conflict resolution, was obtained from the University of Bradford in the United Kingdom. He also has a certificate in advanced conflict mediation skills, obtained from the Center for Conflict Resolution in Cape Town, South Africa.

== Career ==
In 1988, Owiny-Dollo served as legal counsel in the peace talks between the then rebel outfit, Uganda People's Democratic Movement (UPDM), and the government of Uganda. In that capacity, he wrote the peace agreement executed between the government and UPDM, on 3 June 1988, at Pece Stadium, in Gulu.

From 1994 until 1996, he was a member of the Constituent Assembly that drafted the 1995 Uganda Constitution. He also served as a member of parliament, representing Agago County in the 6th Parliament (1996–2001). During the talks between the Lord's Resistance Army and the National Resistance Movement government of Uganda, from 2006 until 2008, Owiny-Dollo served as legal counsel to Reik Machar, the Vice President of South Sudan, who mediated the talks.

In 2008, he was appointed to the High Court of Uganda, serving in that capacity until 2015.

In 2015, Owiny-Dollo, was promoted to the Court of Appeal of Uganda. However, he couldn't immediately take up his appointment because he was hearing a terrorism case in the High Court, in which 13 men were accused of killing 76 people in twin bombings in Kampala in 2010. He disposed of that case in May 2016.

In August 2017, the president of Uganda, appointed Owiny-Dollo, as the Deputy Chief Justice and under Ugandan law, the head of Uganda's Court of Appeal and Uganda's Constitutional Court.

On 20 August 2020, the president of Uganda Yoweri Kaguta Museveni appointed him as the 13th Chief Justice of Uganda, replacing Bart Magunda Katureebe, who clocked the mandatory retirement age of 70, on 19 June 2020.

== Family ==
Justice Owiny-Dollo is married with children and the official wife is Florence Nakachwa Dollo-Owiny who is a former Deputy Director of Law Development Center and now is a Justice of Court of Appeal

== See also ==
- Supreme Court of Uganda
