= Irene Mulyagonja =

Ugandan lawyer and judge

Lady Justice Irene Mulyagonja

Justice of the Uganda Court of Appeal

Personal details
- Born: 1963 (age 62–63) Jinja, Uganda
- Citizenship: Uganda
- Spouse: John Baptist Kakooza (died 17 May 2026).
- Education: Makerere University (Bachelor of Laws) ( Master of Arts in Counseling); Law Development Center (Diploma in Legal Practice); University of Zimbabwe (Diploma in Women's Law)
- Occupation: Lawyer and Judge

Irene Mulyagonja Kakooza (née Irene Mulyagonja), is a Ugandan lawyer and judge who was nominated to sit on the Uganda Court of Appeal on 4 October 2019.

She was the Inspector General of Government, from 12 April 2012 until 4 October 2019. She served as a justice of the High Court of Uganda, from 2008 until 2012.

== Background ==
She was born in 1963, in the city of Jinja, in the Eastern Region of Uganda. Her father was a civil engineer and entrepreneur, who owned a construction company, and her mother was an elementary school teacher. She grew up in an upper-middle-class family of 13 siblings, four of whom were biological, between her two parents, while eight were between her father and other partners.

== Education ==
She attended Naranbhai Road Primary School, in Jinja town, for her entire 7-year primary schooling. She studied at Mount Saint Mary's College Namagunga for both her O-Level and A-Level education. She was admitted to Makerere University, Uganda's oldest and largest public university, to study law, graduating with a Bachelor of Laws degree. She also has a Diploma in Legal Practice, obtained from the Law Development Centre, in Kampala. Her Master of Arts degree in Counseling was awarded by Makerere University. She also has a Diploma in Women's Law, from the University of Zimbabwe.

== Work before the bench ==
In 1989, she was hired as an assistant lecturer at the Law Development Centre, serving in that capacity until 1993. She worked with two large law firms in Kampala, including at Muliira and Company Advocates, where she met her husband. When she left that firm in 1996, she and another female colleague, Eva Luswata Kawuma, formed Kakooza and Kawuma Advocates, an all-female law partnership. The firm was hired by the Non Performing Asset Recovery Trust (NPART), from 1997 until 2006 when the Trust closed down.

== Work as a judge ==
In 2008, at the age of 45 years, Mulyagonja was appointed to the High Court of Uganda. She was assigned to the Jinja circuit for the first two and one half years. She was then reassigned to the commercial division of the high court, rising to the position of deputy head of the Commercial Division of the High Court, by the time she was appointed as Inspector General of Government, in 2012. In October 2019, she was named to sit on the Uganda Court of Appeal, pending approval by the Parliament of Uganda.

== Work as the Inspector General of Government ==
On 12 April 2012, she was appointed as the fourth Inspector General of Government, since 1986, following in the footsteps of Augustine Ruzindana, Jotham Tumwesigye, and Faith Mwondha.

== Family ==
Irene Mulyagonja was married to te late John Baptist Kakooza, and together are the parents of three children.

== See also ==
- Jotham Tumwesigye
- Faith Mwondha
