= Hellen Obura =

Honorable Hellen Obura

Justice of the Court of Appeal of Uganda

Personal details
- Born: Uganda
- Education: Makerere University; Law Development Centre

Hellen Abulu Obura, is a Ugandan judge on the Court of Appeal of Uganda, the second-highest judicial organ in the country, which also doubles as the nation's Constitutional Court. Immediately prior to her appointment to the appeals court, she served as a member of the High Court of Uganda.

== Background, education and early career ==
She was born and educated in Uganda for her pre-university education. She earned a Bachelor of Laws (LLB) degree from Makerere University, the nation's oldest and largest public University. She also obtained a Diploma in Legal Practice, from the Law Development Centre, in Kampala, the country's capital city. For seventeen years, from 1993 until she was appointed as a high court judge, Justice Helen Obura had served in the Uganda Ministry of Justice and Constitutional Affairs. She was the Secretary to the Law Council at the time she was called to the bench in 2010.

== Judicial career ==
Hellen Obura served as judge on the High Court of Uganda, from October 2010, until September 2015, when she was appointed to the Court of Appeal, which also doubles as the Constitutional Court of Uganda.

== See also ==
- Solome Bossa
- Stella Arach-Amoko
- Esther Mayambala Kisaakye
