= Esther Mayambala Kisaakye =

Justice of the Supreme Court of Uganda

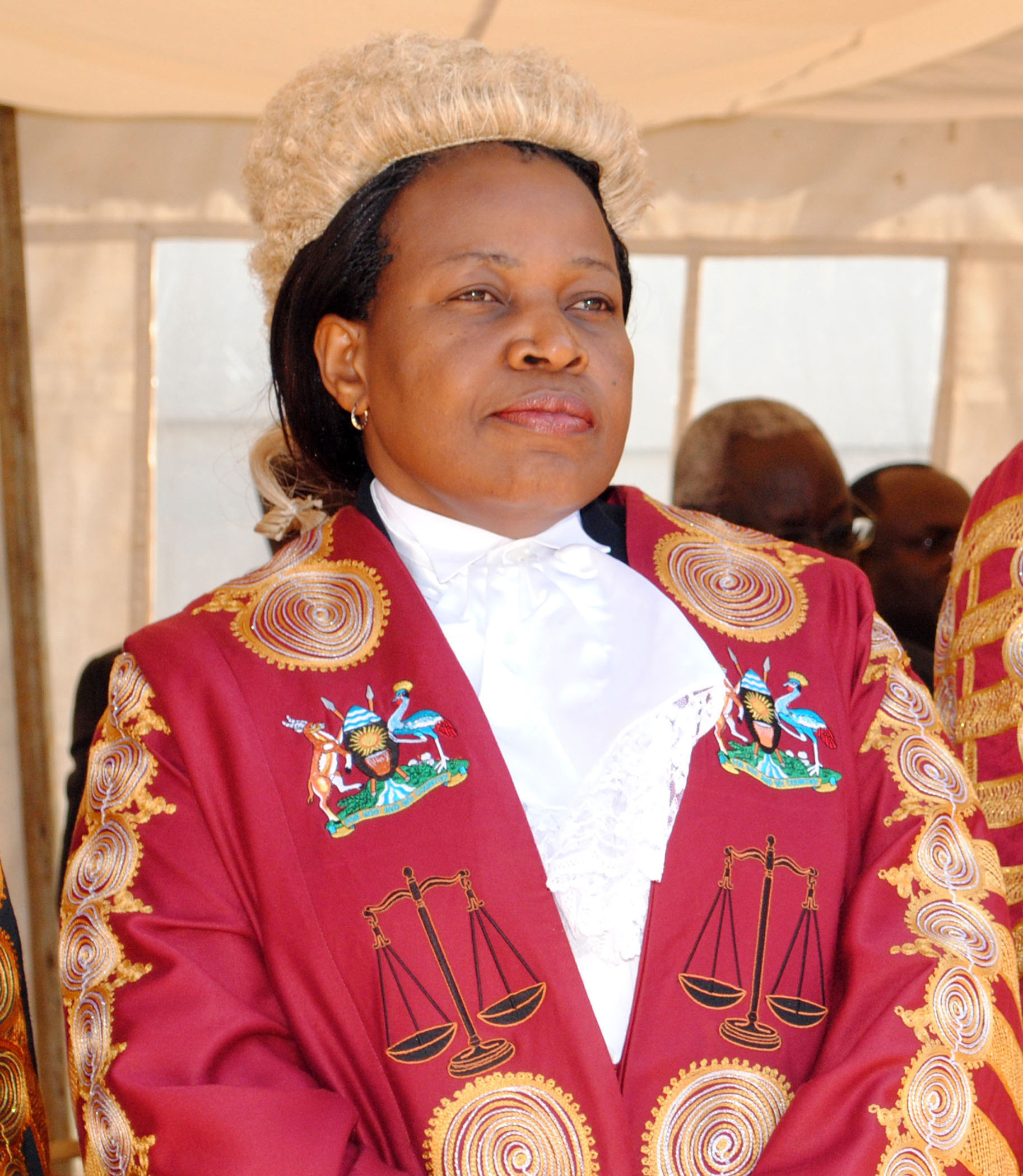
- Born: Uganda
- Citizenship: Uganda
- Education: Makerere University (Bachelor of Laws); Law Development Center (Diploma in Legal Practice); Georgetown University (Master of Arts in Women's Rights); American University (Doctor of Juridical Science)
- Occupations: Lawyer & Judge
- Years active: 1988–present
- Known for: Judiciary
- Title: Justice of the Supreme Court of Uganda

Esther Mayambala Kisaakye is a Ugandan judge. She is a Justice of the Supreme Court of Uganda. She was appointed to that position in July 2009.

== Education ==
She obtained her High School Diploma from Trinity College Nabbingo, an all-girls middle and high school (grades 8 – 13), located in Nabbingo, in Wakiso District in the Buganda Region of Uganda.

Her first degree is a Bachelor of Laws, Upper Second Division, from Makerere University, in Kampala, Uganda's capital and largest city. She also holds a Diploma in Legal Practice from the Law Development Center, also in Kampala. Esther Kisaakye holds a Master of Laws from Georgetown University Law Center, in Washington, DC, in the USA. Her degree of Doctor of Juridical Science (SJD), was obtained from the American University, also in Washington, with the help of an international fellowship from the American Association of University Women and on a scholarship grant from the Margaret McNamara Memorial Fund.

== Career ==
Prior to her appointment to the Supreme court, she served as a lecturer at the Faculty of Law at Makerere University. Besides lecturing at Makerere, she served as vice chairperson of the Association of Uganda Women Lawyers, which operated a legal aid clinic. In 1993, she was selected by the Leadership & Advocacy for Women in Africa Program to do a Master of Arts on Women's Rights at Georgetown University Law Center. The East African Journal on Peace & Human Rights published her thesis, Changing the Terms of the Debate to Resolve the Polygamy Question in Africa.

She served as board member of the Uganda AIDS Commission and a co-founder of the Strategic Litigation Coalition. In April 2013 she was appointed the chair of the East African Judicial Committee. In September 2013, Kisaakye was elected as the new president of the National Association of Women Judges in Uganda. She was part of the panel of the Supreme Court Judges who handled the NUP Party's Kyagulanyi Ssentamu Robert Presidential Election Petition No. 01 of 2021 that alleged electoral fraud in the 2021 Presidential elections. However, there was controversy when she accused Chief Justice Owiny Dollo of confiscating her file with a minority ruling.

In September 2023, the Daily Monitor reported that Justice Kisaakye, then aged 63, had written to president Yoweri Museveni, the "appointing authority", requesting early retirement, seven years before attaining the mandatory retirement age of 70 for a Uganda Supreme Court justice.

== Books authored ==
- The Human Rights of Women: International Instruments and African Experiences, published in 2002 by Zed Books
- Employment Discrimination Against Women Lawyers in Uganda: Lessons & Prospects for Enhancing Equal Opportunities for Women in Formal Employment published by American University, Washington College of Law, in 2009

== See also ==
- Judiciary of Uganda
