= Richard Buteera =

Ugandan lawyer and judge

- Born: Uganda
- Citizenship: Uganda
- Education: Makerere University (Bachelor of Laws); Law Development Centre (Diploma in Legal Practice)
- Occupations: Lawyer, judge
- Known for: Law
- Title: Justice of the Supreme Court of Uganda

Richard Buteera, also Richard Butera, is a Ugandan lawyer and judge who has served as a member of the Supreme Court of Uganda since September 2017. Immediately prior to his appointment to the Supreme Court, he served as a Justice of the Uganda Court of Appeal.

== Background and education ==
Buteera was born in Uganda. After attending local primary and secondary schools, he was admitted to Makerere University, Uganda's oldest and largest public university. He graduated from Makerere with a Bachelor of Laws degree. He followed that with a postgraduate Diploma in Legal Practice, awarded by the Law Development Centre, in Kampala. He was then admitted to the Uganda Bar.

== Career ==
During the early 2010s, he served as the Director of Public Prosecution (DPP), in the Uganda Ministry of Justice and Constitutional Affairs, prior to his appointment to the Court of Appeal. While there, he advised the then Inspector General of the Uganda Police Force, General Kale Kayihura, that as of April 2013, there was no law in Uganda against drink-walking. “Whereas it is undesirable for people to walk while drunk, but they are not breaking any traffic laws and it is improper for police to arrest them,” Buteera is quoted to have said.

He also pioneered a program to reduce the backlog of cases of suspects on remand in Uganda's prisons, where, as of April 2010, there were 33,000 prisoners in the system that was built to house 13,700 inmates. Of these, 45 percent were convicts and 55 percent were suspects on remand. The program was intended to reduce the remand prisoners in the system.

As a Supreme Court Justice, in January 2020, at a Judicial Officers Conference, he advised the officers to take special care of complainants who are elderly, disabled or with other special needs, including pregnant women and children.

In July 2020, the President of Uganda, named Justice Buteera to be a member of the Judicial Service Commission, a constitutional body mandated to recruit judges and regulate their conduct. He was sworn in on 24 July 2020.

== See also ==
- Judiciary of Uganda
