= Steven Kavuma =

Ugandan lawyer and judge

- Born: September 29, 1947 (age 78); Uganda
- Citizenship: Uganda
- Education: Makerere University (Bachelor of Laws); Law Development Centre (Diploma in Legal Practice)
- Occupations: Lawyer, judge
- Years active: 1986 — present
- Known for: Law
- Title: Deputy Chief Justice of Uganda

Steven Kavuma is a Ugandan judge and the immediate former deputy chief justice of Uganda. He was appointed to that post on 5 March 2015. From April 2013 until March 2015, he served as the acting Chief Justice of Uganda, pending the appointment of a substantive Chief Justice by the President of Uganda. However, the way Uganda's judiciary is configured, the Deputy Chief Justice is not a member of the Supreme Court of Uganda, but is a member of the Court of Appeal of Uganda.

== Background and education ==
He was born in Central Uganda on 28 September 1947. He studied law at Makerere University, Uganda's oldest and largest public university, graduating with the degree of Bachelor of Laws. He also holds a Diploma in Legal practice, obtained from the Law Development Centre in Kampala, Uganda's capital and largest city.

== Career ==
In the early 2000s, Steven Kavuma served as the State Minister for Defence. He was appointed to the Uganda High Court following the 2006 national elections. When Benjamin Odoki stepped down as the Chief Justice, Justice Kavuma was appointed Acting Chief Justice, from April 2013 until March 2015. In 2020, Steven Kavuma was appointed as the board chairman of The Uganda Civil Aviation Authority (CAA) the country’s aviation regulator and all government and civilian airports including Entebbe International Airport.

== See also ==
- Alfonse Owiny-Dollo
- Judiciary of Uganda
- Parliament of Uganda
- Cabinet of Uganda
