= Moses Kawumi Kazibwe =

Ugandan lawyer and judge

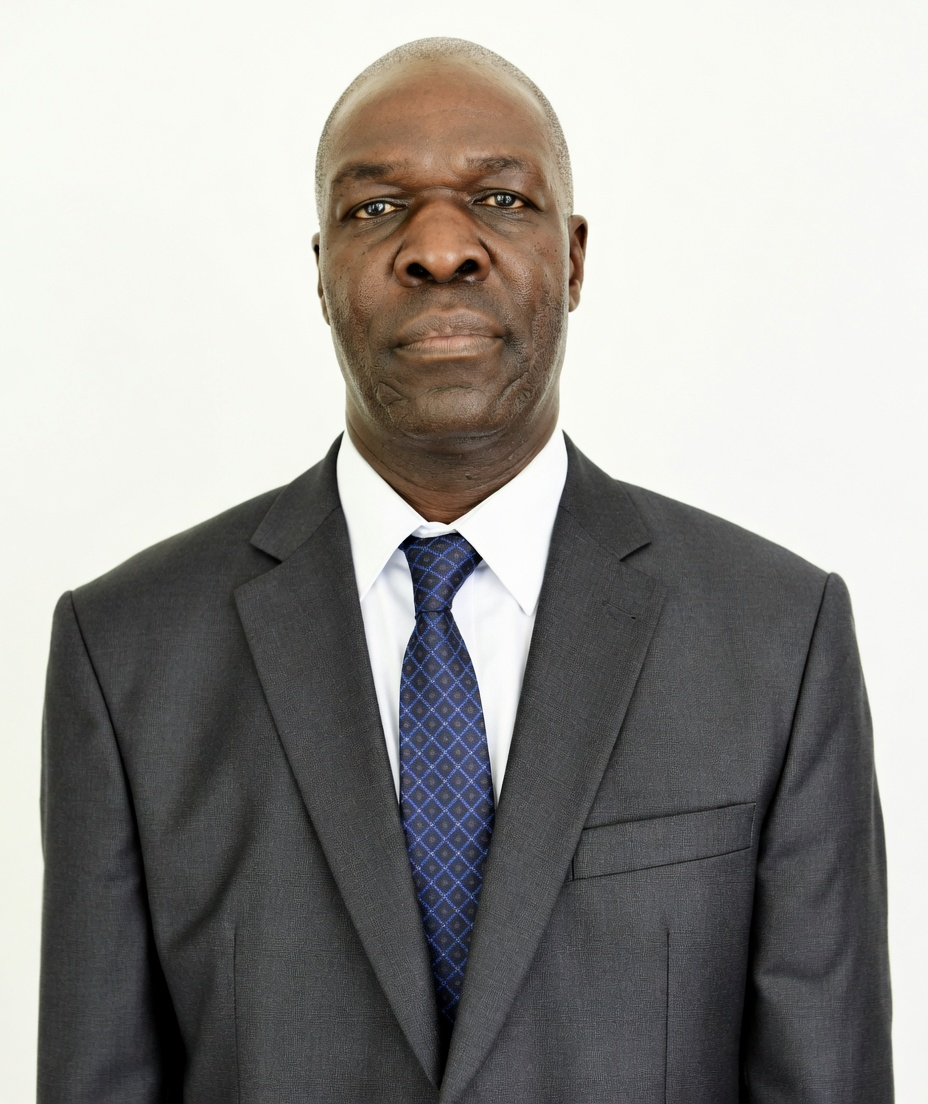
- Justice Moses Kawumi Kazibwe
- Born: 1963 (age 62–63); Busiro County, Wakiso District, Uganda
- Citizenship: Uganda
- Education: Makerere University (Bachelor of Laws); Law Development Centre (Diploma in Legal Practice)
- Occupations: Lawyer, judge
- Known for: Law
- Title: Justice of the Court of Appeal of Uganda and Deputy Chief Justice of Uganda

Moses Kawumi Kazibwe, also Moses Kazibwe Kawumi , is a Ugandan lawyer and judge who has served as a member of the Court of Appeal of Uganda since May 2024. Prior to his appointment to the Court of Appeal, he has served at the Highcourt in Kabale, Masaka, and Mubende. On 14 May 2026, President Yoweri Museveni appointed him as the Deputy Chief Justice of Uganda.

== Background and education ==
Kazibwe was born in Wakiso, Uganda in 1963. After attending local primary school, he joined Kako Secondary School in Masaka before being admitted to Makerere University, Uganda's oldest and largest public university in 1984. He graduated from Makerere with a Bachelor of Laws degree. He followed that with a postgraduate Diploma in Legal Practice, awarded by the Law Development Centre, in Kampala in 1988. He was then admitted to the Uganda Bar.

== Career ==
For 13 years, he worked at the Uganda Revenue Authority, 7 of which he was a lecturer of taxation law at Uganda Christian University for 7 years. He was appointed by the Judicial Service Commission as the High Court Judge of Kabale, Masaka and Mubende before his appointment in 2024 to the Court of Appeal as a Judge.

== See also ==
- Judiciary of Uganda
