= King's College, Budo =

King's College Budo

Location
- Budo, Wakiso District; Uganda; 0°15′24″N 32°29′12″E

Information
- Type: Secondary school
- Motto: Gakyali Mabaga (So little done, so much more to do)
- Religious affiliation: Anglican
- Established: 1906
- Founder: Henry Walter Weatherhead
- Headmaster: Godfrey Kasamba
- Chaplain: Abraham Nkata Kato
- Enrollment: c. 2,200
- Houses: 7 for boys (Canada, England, Ghana, Mutesa, Australia, South Africa, Nigeria), 3 for girls (Sabaganzi, Grace, Guster)
- Colours: Red and white
- Sports: Rugby, cricket, football, track, tennis, swimming, volleyball, hockey, basketball and golf
- Nickname: Budo
- Publication: The Budonian
- Alumni: Old Budonians
- Website: kcb.ac.ug//

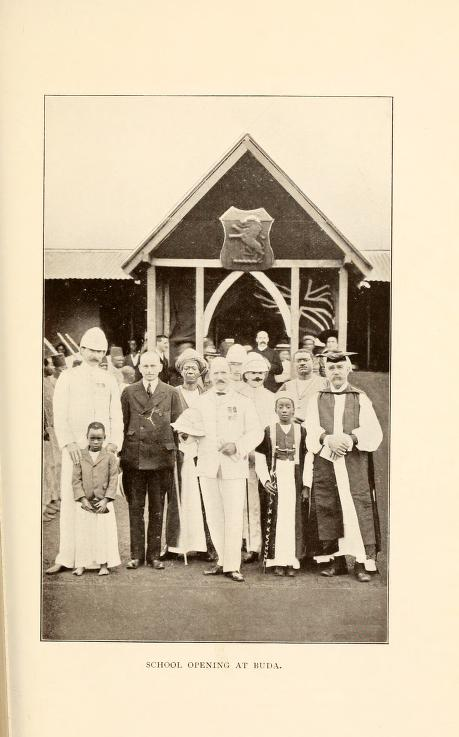
George Wilson opening King's College Budo in 1906

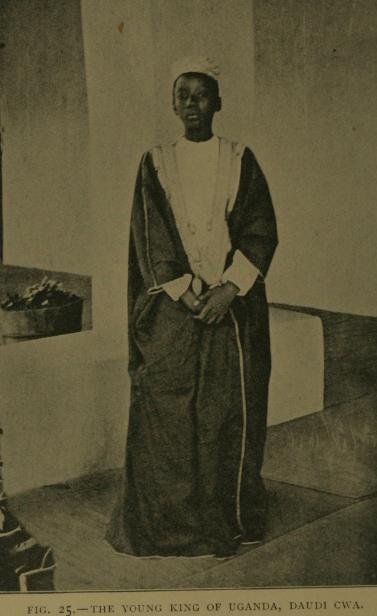
Daudi Chwa of Buganda was once a student at King's College Budo.

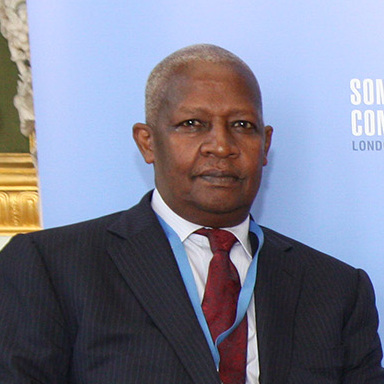
Sam Kutesa studied at King's College, Budo.

King's College Budo is a mixed-sex, residential, secondary school in Central Uganda (Buganda).

Established on March 29, 1906, on land donated by the Kabaka of Buganda, King's College Budo became one of the first institutions for higher education in Uganda and the first mixed-sex institution of higher learning in Uganda when it admitted girls in 1934. For nearly 120 years, King's College Budo has been famous for producing leaders within Uganda, a group commonly known as "Budonians".

The school’s alumni association, the Old Budonian Club (OBC), is one of the oldest in Uganda, and includes a number of highly influential people who have served at the highest levels of politics, academia, law, and diplomacy in Uganda and across East Africa. It is the only school in Uganda that has three former heads of state and several reigning kings as its former students.

The school is managed primarily by the Church of Uganda, particularly the Namirembe Diocese. The school board is chaired by Katende Jimmy Rogers, who previously served as PTA chairman and president of the Old Budonian Club. The headmaster, who is the central administrative figure, is Godfrey Kasamba. Other notable administration figures include Alice Kaddu and Abraham Nkata Kato who serves as chaplain.

== Location ==
The school is located on Naggalabi Hill, in southern Wakiso District, off the Kampala-Masaka Road. This location lies approximately 14 kilometres (8.7 mi), by road, southwest of the central business district of Kampala, the capital of Uganda and the largest city in that country.

== History ==
The school was officially opened on 29 March 1906 with 21 boys. It was founded by His Majesty's Acting Commissioner of the Uganda Protectorate, George Wilson and the Church Missionary Society. It is one of the oldest schools in Uganda. The land on which it was built was donated by the Kabaka of Buganda. The school was originally started a boys-only school for the sons of chiefs and kings. In 1934, girls were admitted, making it a mixed-sex education school.

The school has benefited from the support of Monkton Combe School in England. During the service of thanksgiving for Monkton Combe School's centenary held at St Paul's Cathedral in London in May 1968, the money donated during the collection was used to found several Monkton Combe scholarships at King's College.

In late March 1979, the college staff evacuated the students and the remaining civilian population of Budo hill due to the Uganda–Tanzania War. The Libyan Armed Forces, allied with the Uganda Army at the time, subsequently set up camp at the facility. Soon after, the Tanzania People's Defence Force (TPDF) and Ugandan rebels attacked and overran the camp as part of Operation Dada Idi. About two dozen Libyans were killed and buried in a nearby mass grave.

The TPDF consequently used the King's College Budo as a base, and when it was reopened in June 1979, the students coexisted with the Tanzanian soldiers until the latter withdrew from Uganda.

== Houses of residence ==
King's College Budo has nine houses of residence.

House	Named after ^{†}	Girls/boys
Australia House	Australia	Boys
Canada House	Canada	Boys
England House	England	Boys
Ghana House	Ghana	Boys
Grace House	Herbert M. Grace, HM of Budo 1926–1934	Girls
Mutesa House	Edward Muteesa II, former student and first president of Uganda	Boys
Nigeria House	Nigeria	Boys
Sabaganzi House	H.W. Weatherhead, founding HM nicknamed Sabaganzi (the much loved one)	Girls
South Africa	South Africa	Boys

== Notable alumni ==
Alumni of Budo are known as Old Budonians. The Old Budonians Club (OBC) is the oldest alumni fraternity in Uganda, having been formed in 1914. Old Budonians have distinguished themselves in service to Uganda and Buganda Kingdom. Three of Uganda's post-colonial heads of state were educated at King's College Budo.

=== Royals ===
- Daudi Chwa II - 34th Kabaka of Buganda
- Edward Mutesa II - 35th Kabaka of Buganda and first president of Uganda
- Ezekiel Tenywa Wako - Zibondo of Bulamogi
- George David Matthew Kamurasi Rukidi III of Toro - Omukama of Toro
- Henry Wako Muloki - Kyabazinga of Busoga
- Muwenda Mutebi II - 36th Kabaka of Buganda
- Yosia Nadiope - Gabula of Bugabula, Busoga

=== Politics ===
- Edward Muteesa II - first president of Uganda
- Yusuf Lule - fourth president of Uganda
- Godfrey Binaisa - fifth president of Uganda
- Samson Kisekka - vice president of Uganda 1991–1994, prime minister of Uganda 1986–1991
- Apolo Nsibambi - prime minister of Uganda 1999–2011
- Ignatius K. Musaazi - founder of the first political party in Uganda, the Uganda National Congress
- Grace Ibingira - Minister of Justice , and the designer of the Uganda flag
- Daudi Ochieng - Secretary General Kabaka Yekka party and Member of Parliament for Mityana
- Abu Mayanja - Attorney General and third deputy prime minister 1986–1994
- Aggrey Awori - Minister for ICT 2009–2011
- Beti Kamya-Turwomwe - Inspector General of Government
- Charles Njonjo - Attorney General of Kenya 1963–1979
- Bertha Kingori - member of the Legislative Council of Tanganyika
- Crispus Kiyonga - chancellor Makerere University
- Jehoash Mayanja Nkangi - justice minister (1998–2008), finance minister (1989–1998), and Katikkiro of Buganda (1964–1966, 1993–1994)
- James Wapakhabulo - speaker of the Ugandan parliament 1993–1996
- Rhoda Kalema - old girl and delegate in the 1994 Ugandan Constituent Assembly election
- John Ssebaana Kizito - mayor of Kampala 1996–2006
- Olara Otunnu - UPC president, under secretary of the United Nations
- Sam Kutesa - former member of the Ugandan parliament and former Minister for Foreign Affairs
- Apollo Kironde - Uganda's first representative to the UN

=== Law ===
- Benjamin Joseph Odoki - chief justice of the Republic of Uganda (2001–2013)
- Alfonse Owiny-Dollo - chief justice of the Republic of Uganda
- James Munange Ogoola - former principal judge and former head of the Commercial Court of Uganda
- Laeticia Kikonyogo - former deputy chief justice and head of the Court of Appeal of Uganda (2001–2010)
- Geoffrey Kiryabwire - justice of the Court of Appeal
- Julia Sebutinde - judge at the International Court of Justice, The Hague, Netherlands
- Michael Chibita - justice of the Supreme Court of Uganda
- Peter Nyombi - former attorney general of the Republic of Uganda
- Kiryowa Kiwanuka - attorney general of the Republic of Uganda

=== Diplomats and civil service ===
- Amanya Mushega - former secretary general of the East African Community (2001–2006)
- Jennifer Musisi - lawyer and administrator, former executive director of the Kampala Capital City Authority (2011–2018)
- Winnie Byanyima - executive director of UNAIDS

=== Traditional civil service ===
- Joash Mayanja Nkangi - Katikkiro of Buganda Kingdom 1964–1993
- Michael Kintu - Katikkiro of Buganda Kingdom 1955–1964
- Paulo Kavuma - Katikkiro of Buganda Kingdom 1950–1955
- Michael Kawalya Kagwa - Katikkiro of Buganda Kingdom 1945–1950

=== Academia ===
- Frederick Kayanja - vice chancellor of Mbarara University of Science & Technology, 1989–2014
- Martin Aliker - founding chancellor of Gulu University
- Peter Mugyenyi - Ugandan physician, HIV/AIDS researcher, co-founder and director of the Joint Clinical Research Centre
- Senteza Kajubi - vice chancellor of Makerere University 1977–1979, 1990–1993
- Sarah Nyendwoha Ntiro - first female university graduate in East and Central Africa from Oxford University

=== Writers ===
- Christopher Henry Muwanga Barlow - poet
- David Rubadiri - poet and first Malawian ambassador to the United Nations
- Elvania Namukwaya Zirimu - poet, dramatist
- Okot p'Bitek - poet
- Timothy Wangusa - author, poet, and literature scholar

== See also ==
- Education in Uganda
- Groupe Scolaire Officiel de Butare, a comparable institution in Rwanda
