= Bart Magunda Katureebe =

Ugandan judge

- Katureebe in 2017

Chief Justice of Uganda
- In office 5 March 2015 – 19 June 2020
- Deputy: Steven Kavuma; Alfonse Owiny-Dollo
- Preceded by: Benjamin Josses Odoki
- Succeeded by: Alfonse Owiny-Dollo

Personal details
- Born: 20 June 1950 (age 76) Rubirizi, Uganda
- Citizenship: Uganda
- Education: Makerere University (Bachelor of Laws); Law Development Centre (Diploma in Legal Practice)
- Occupation: Lawyer, judge and Former Chief Justice

Bart Magunda Katureebe is a Ugandan judge and the former Chief Justice of Uganda. He was appointed to that position on 5 March 2015. Before that, he was a justice of the Supreme Court of Uganda.

== Background and education ==
He was born on 20 June 1950, in Rugazi Village, Rubirizi District in the Western Region of Uganda to Yowana Magunda and Virginia Ngonzi. He went to Rugazi Primary School for his elementary schooling from 1957 until 1962. He then went to St. Joseph Junior Secondary School in Mbarara from 1963 to 1964, and Kitunga High School in Ntungamo District for his O-Level from 1965 until 1968. He attended Namilyango College, an all-boys boarding school in Mukono District, for his A-Level education from 1969 to 1970. Four years later, he graduated from Makerere University with a Bachelor of Laws degree. He went on to receive a Diploma in Legal practice from the Law Development Centre in Kampala, Uganda's capital and largest city.

== Career ==
From 1975 until 1983, Katureebe worked as a state attorney in the Ministry of Justice. From 1983 until 1988, he practiced law in a private setting. From 1988 until 1991, he served as the deputy minister for regional cooperation, then deputy minister of industry and technology (1991 to 1992), and State Minister for Health and a member of the National Resistance Council, a legislative body at that time (1992 to 1996). From 1994 until 1995, he was the elected member of the Constituent Assembly representing Bunyaruguru County, Rubirizi District. From 1996 until 2001, he served as the minister of justice, constitutional affairs and attorney general. He went back to private practice in 2001, becoming one of the founding partners of Kampala Associated Advocates. Chambers Global named him one of Uganda’s leading lawyers in 2004 and he also served as Board Chairman of the Vision Group (a media company) and served on the Standard Chartered Bank Ltd’s Board of Directors. He was appointed a justice of the Supreme Court in 2005. On 5 March 2015, he was appointed chief justice. On 20 June 2020, he marked his last day in office as a chief justice of the Republic of Uganda and handed over to his Deputy Alfonse Owiny-Dollo to be the Acting Chief Justice. On December 8, 2020 he was appointed a member of International Commercial Expert Committee of the Supreme Court of the People’s Republic of China for a four-year contract, which runs until December 8, 2024.

== Other considerations ==
Katureebe is married and a father of six children. He is a member of the Judicial Service Commission.

== See also ==
- Government of Uganda
- Uganda Law Society
- Judiciary of Uganda
