= Faith Mwondha =

Ugandan lawyer and judge

- Born: March 16, 1954 (age 72); Uganda
- Citizenship: Uganda
- Education: Makerere University (Bachelor of Laws); Law Development Centre (Diploma in Legal Practice); De Montfort University (Master of Laws)
- Occupations: Lawyer, judge
- Years active: 1979 — present
- Known for: Law
- Title: Justice of the Supreme Court of Uganda

Faith Essy Kalikwani Mwondha is a Ugandan lawyer and judge who has served as a Justice of the Supreme Court of Uganda, since 8 September 2015.

== Background and education ==
She was born on 16 March 1964. From 1968 until 1971, she attended Iganga Secondary School for her O-Level education. She studied at Namasagali College for her A-Level studies, from 1972 until 1973. She holds a Bachelor of Laws, awarded by Makerere University, in Kampala, Uganda's capital and largest city. She also holds a Diploma in Legal Practice, awarded by the Law Development Centre, also in Kampala. Her Master of Laws was obtained from De Montfort University, in Leicester, in the United Kingdom.

== Career ==
In 1979, she was appointed Grade Two Magistrate in Kampala. In 1984, she enrolled as an advocate of the High Court of Uganda. From 1987 until 1990, when she was confirmed, she served as the acting Chief Magistrate in Jinja.

In 1994, Faith Mwonda was elected as the woman delegate representing the town of Jinja in the Constituent Assembly, which promulgated the 1995 Uganda constitution. She was a member of the National Resistance Council (parliament), prior to 1996.

In 1996, she appointed a commissioner at Uganda Human Rights Commission. In 2001, she was appointed to the High Court of Uganda. In 2005, she was appointed Inspector General of Government (IGG).

== Other considerations ==
She is the founder partner of the law firm of Mwondha & Co. Advocates. While at Makerere University, Mwondha was Secretary of Mary Stuart Hall. From 1991 until 1998, she served as a delegate of the Church of Uganda to the World Council of Churches in Geneva. She also served as a member of Makerere University Council, from 1995 until 1997. In 2000, she was appointed to the University Council of Uganda Christian University, in Mukono. She is also a member of the Global Board, the United Bible Society and serves as the chairperson of Iganga Secondary School Old Students Association.

== See also ==
- Judiciary of Uganda
