= Catherine Bamugemereire =

Ugandan lawyer and judge

- Born: 1970 (age 55–56); Uganda
- Citizenship: Uganda
- Education: Makerere University (Bachelor of Laws); Law Development Centre (Diploma in Legal Practice); Southern Methodist University (Masters in Comparative Law)
- Occupations: Lawyer, judge
- Years active: 1993 — present
- Known for: Law
- Title: Justice of the Supreme Court of Uganda
- Spouse(s): George Bamugemereire (LLB, LLM, Dip.Leg.Pract.)

Catherine Bamugemereire is a Ugandan lawyer and judge who was appointed as a member of the Supreme Court of Uganda, on 17 January 2024. Before that, from 2015 until January 2024, she served as a Justice of the Court of Appeal of Uganda, which doubles as Uganda's Constitutional Court.

== Background and education ==
She was born in Bubulo, in the then Mbale District, but today is Manafwa District, in the 1970s. She attended Nabumali High School for her secondary education. She holds a Bachelor of Laws, awarded in 1992 by Makerere University, in Kampala, the capital and largest in the county. She also holds a Diploma in Legal Practice, awarded by the Law Development Centre, also in Kampala. Her Master of Laws in Comparative Law and International Law, was obtained from Southern Methodist University, in Dallas, Texas, United States, in 2003.

== Career ==
Bamugemereire first worked in 1993, as a State Attorney in the Uganda Ministry of Justice and Constitutional Affairs, based in the town of Arua, Arua District, in the West Nile sub-region. Later, she was appointed as a Grade One Magistrate. She rose through the ranks to the rank of Chief Magistrate of "the White Collar Criminal Court in Uganda in the 1990s".

In 2001, she took leave from the bench, when her family moved to Mexico City where her husband worked in Shell Mexico LPG. She later studied for her master's degree in the United States. In 2003, she relocated to the United Kingdom and worked as Associate Lecturer at the University of Surrey, for seven years.

In 2010, the Ugandan Judiciary appointed her a Judge in the High Court, to work in the Anti-Corruption and Family Divisions of the Court. She conducted civil and criminal court assignments throughout Uganda. She is an expert on corruption, and has spoken widely and written extensively about the subject. In 2015, she was appointed to Uganda's Court of Appeal/Constitutional Court, where she still served until her elevation to the Supreme Court in January 2024.

== Commissions of inquiry ==
Catherine Bamugemereire has chaired three national investigations in matters of corruption in government departments: (a) the tribunal that examined Kampala Capital City Authority, from June 2013 until November 2013. (b) the inquiry into the Uganda National Roads Authority, from June 2015 until January 2016 and (c) the Commission of Inquiry into land grabbing and land wrangles in Uganda's Land Sector, that started in 2017.

== Family ==
She is married to George Bamugemereire and they have children.

== Honors ==
In 2017, Southern Methodist University bestowed on her the Distinguished Global Alumni Award, in recognition of her body of work.

== See also ==
- Ministry of Justice and Constitutional Affairs (Uganda)
