= James Nangwala =

Ugandan lawyer and academic

- Born: 1964 (age 61–62); Uganda
- Citizenship: Uganda
- Education: Makerere University (Bachelor of Laws); Law Development Centre (Diploma in Legal Practice)
- Occupation: Lawyer
- Years active: 1988 - present
- Known for: Legal Skills
- Title: Partner; Nagwala, Rezida & Company Advocates
- Spouse: Mrs. Nagwala

James Nangwala is a Ugandan lawyer notable for his defence of The Monitor (Uganda) Newspaper editors Charles Onyango-Obbo and Andrew Mwenda. He was formerly the head of the Bar Course at the Law Development Centre, the Statutory Body charged with the sole responsibility of training lawyers in Uganda. He is currently a senior lecturer at Makerere University.

During November 2009, after the first day of his defense of the Monitor editors in court, Nangwala was shot in the shoulder while outside of his home. He was seriously wounded and subsequently had to be operated on. The shooting caused the trial to be adjourned until January 2000. Three men were tried for the shooting during June 2010 and were charged with conspiracy to murder and attempted murder. One of the men was a police officer.
