= Mackay Memorial College =

Coordinates: 0°18′25″N 32°32′4″E

Information
- School type: Secondary school
- Established: 1967; 59 years ago
- Enrollment: c.1100

Mackay College is a government aided secondary school located in Nateete, one of Kampala's suburbs, in Lubaga Division, Kampala District, Uganda. It is 8km from the city centre, off Masaka road, within the vicinity of Mackay Church of Uganda Nateete in Nateete Church Zone.The school established in 1967, it provides both 'O' Level and 'A' Level education with a focus on academic excellence and practical skills development. The college offers a comprehensive curriculum for both Ordinary (S.1–S.4) and Advanced (S.5–S.6) levels.

== Performance ==
In the 2023 UCE results, the school recorded strong performance with 70% of candidates passing in Division One or Two. The school is active in regional competitions, like the URA Tax Poem contest, where it recently placed third.

== Operations ==
The school operates a small piggery where pupils learn to care for domestic pigs. Students are trained how to grow vegetables (without using artificial fertilizers) through the organic farming project led by the biology teacher Migadde Jane. Other projects run by the school, such as briquette making, seek to produce self-reliant and self-employed students in order to curb unemployment in the area.

For day students (S.1–S.4), school fees have been cited at approximately 450,000/= per term, excluding uniform and additional requirements.

== History ==
The school was founded in 1967 on a private basis and later became government aided in 1980. It is a mixed day 'O' and 'A' level secondary school. Currently, it has a population of approximately 1100 students.

The school is named after Alexander Murdoch Mackay, a missionary, a teacher and an engineer who contributed tremendously to Christianity and education in Uganda.

Mackay Memorial College has been the recipient of multiple grants from the TEAA (Teachers for East Africa Alumni) totalling $4400. This has been allocated for computers, instructor education, books, and a computing environment. Individuals within the organization have donated tuition money for students as well as computers.

Gertrude Sekabira was the headteacher of Mackay Memorial College from 2001 to January 2021, when she died from COVID-19.

In June 2022, Mary Mukasa Kalyango was appointed as the headteacher of this school. She encountered a number of challenges such as old infrastructure and the accumulation of debts. Facilities such as the laboratory, library and dormitories were in a dire state. She renovated the laboratory and gave it the right equipment, stocked the library and hired more teachers. This effort led to an improvement in academics at the school. In 2023, the school obtained 64 first grades from students who sat their Uganda Certificate of Education examination.

== Notable alumni ==
- Esta Nambayo, lawyer and judge

== See also ==
- Education in Uganda
