= Fred Ruhindi =

Ugandan lawyer and politician

- Born: 29 August 1955 (age 71); Uganda
- Citizenship: Uganda
- Education: Makerere University (Bachelor of Laws); Law Development Centre (Diploma in Legal Practice); University of Edinburgh (Master of Laws)
- Occupations: Lawyer & Politician
- Years active: 1981 — present
- Known for: Politics
- Title: State Minister for Justice

Fredrick Ruhindi, commonly known as Freddie Ruhindi or Fred Ruhindi, is a Ugandan lawyer and politician. He was the Attorney General of Uganda from 1 March 2015 to 2016. Between 2 June 2006 and 28 February 2015, he served as the State Minister for Justice & Constitutional Affairs in the Ugandan Cabinet. In the cabinet reshuffle of 16 February 2009, and that of 27 May 2011, he retained his cabinet post. He is also the elected Member of Parliament representing Nakawa Division in Kampala District.

== Background and education ==
He was born on 29 August 1955. He attended Mbarara High School for his O-Level education, and attained Certificate of Education (UCE) in 1973. He studied at Ntare School for his A-Level studied, and attained Uganda Advanced Certificate of Education in 1975. He holds the degree of Bachelor of Laws from Makerere University. He also holds the Diploma in Legal Practice from the Law Development Centre in Kampala, Uganda's capital and largest metropolitan area. His Master of Laws degree was obtained from the University of Edinburgh.

== Career ==
For a period of eleven years, between 1981 until 1992, Fred Ruhindi worked as a State Attorney, in the Ministry of Justice & Constitutional Affairs. He was then transferred to the Uganda Investment Authority, where he served as Corporation Secretary, from 1992 until 1999. He entered politics in 2001 and was elected to parliament to represent Nakawa Division, Kampala District. He was re-elected in 2006. He has served as State Minister for Justice & Constitutional Affairs since 2006. From June 2006 until February 2015, he also served as the Deputy Attorney General of Uganda. In a cabinet reshuffle on 1 March 2015, he was appointed the Attorney General of Uganda.

== Personal information ==
Fred Ruhindi is widowed. He belongs to the National Resistance Movement political party. He is of the Christian faith.

== See also ==
- Parliament of Uganda
- Cabinet of Uganda
- Nakawa Division
