= Achia Remegio =

Ugandan Politician, Economist and Statistician (born 1970)

Achia Remigio
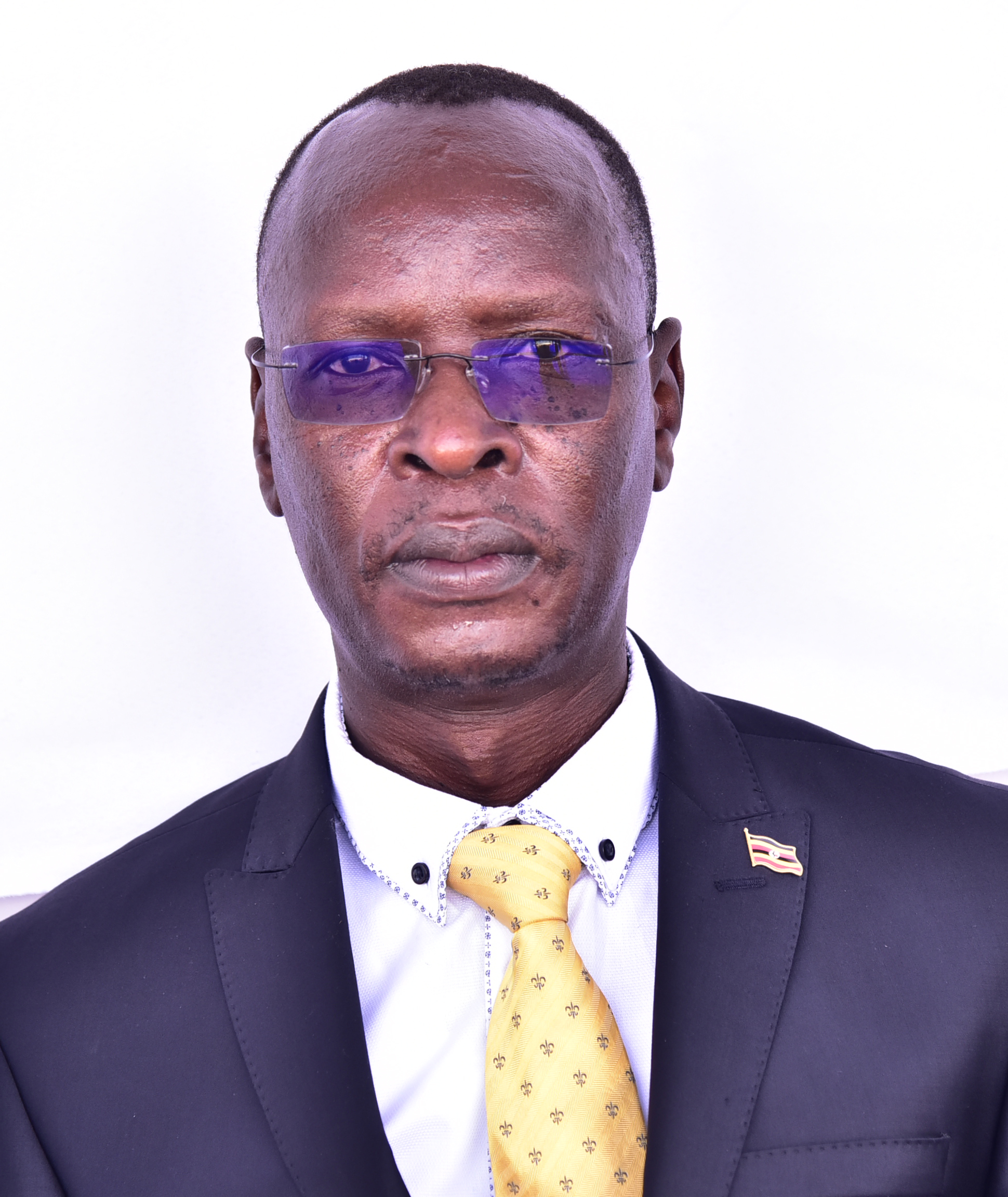
- Born: 27 December 1970 (age 55); Nakabilatuk District in Northern region of Uganda
- Education: Makerere University
- Years active: 2006–present
- Known for: Member of Parliament
- Political party: National Resistance Movement for Pian County, Nakapiripirit District
- Spouse: Jane Frances Abodo

Achia Remigio (born 27 December 1970) is a Ugandan politician, economist and statistician. He has been a member of Parliament under the National Resistance Movement representing Pian County, Nabilatuk District from 2006 to the present.

== Personal life and education ==
He was born in Nakapiripirit District found in the Northern Region of Uganda. He is married to former Uganda's Director of Public Prosecutions and now a principal judge of Uganda, Justice Jane Frances Abodo.

He attended St. Mary's Seminary Nadiket, Moroto, Uganda for his secondary school diploma. Between 1986 and 1990, he joined Makerere University and graduated with a Bachelor of Statistics and Applied Economics.

== Career background ==
He served as the Technical Consultant at the Food and Agriculture Organization (FAO) of the United Nations between November 1999 to May 2005. From May 2011 to date, he has served as the Deputy Chairman of the Budget Committee at the Parliament of Uganda. From April 2006 to date, he has been a Member of the Parliament of Uganda with duties such as resource allocation evaluation, Budget analysis, and goal-oriented budget implementation. He was the Deputy Chairman of the National Economy Committee between May 2006 and July 2009.

Remigio Achia is currently the chairperson of the Karamoja Parliamentary Caucus. He criticized the UPDF for criminalizing the entire region and this attitude has resulted in the loss of over 3,000 law-abiding citizens, as well as thousands of children who have been forced into destitution on the streets or in urban centres.

== See also ==
- List of members of the eleventh Parliament of Uganda
- Jane Frances Abodo
- Obote Clement Kenneth
