= Benjamin Josses Odoki =

Former Chief Justice of Uganda

Honorable Benjamin Josses Odoki

Chairman of the Committee of Constitutional Experts for Drafting the EAC Political Federation Constitution
- Incumbent
- Assumed office September 2018
- Appointed by: Yoweri Museveni
- Deputy: Amos Wako

Chief Justice of Uganda
- In office 2001 – 23 June 2013
- Preceded by: Samuel Wako Wambuzi

Justice of the Supreme Court of Uganda
- In office 1986 – 23 June 2013

Personal details
- Born: March 23, 1943 (age 83) Dhaka, Busia District, Uganda
- Spouse: Mrs. Veronica Odoki
- Education: University of Dar es Salaam (Bachelor of Laws); Law Development Centre (Diploma in Legal Practice)
- Profession: Lawyer

Benjamin Josses Odoki (born 23 March 1943) is a former Chief Justice of Uganda, former Supreme Court Justice of Eswatini, and current Chairman of the Committee of Constitutional Experts for Drafting the EAC Political Federation Constitution, the committee drafting the constitution for the East African Confederation. Odoki served as the tenth Chief Justice of Uganda from 2001 to 2013 after fifteen years as a Judge on the Supreme Court of Uganda. He was a State Attorney of Uganda previous to his appointment to the court in 1986.

== Background and education ==
He was born in Dhaka Village, Busia District, in the Eastern Region of Uganda, on 23 March 1943, in a family with modest means. He studied at King's College, Budo, in Wakiso District, for his secondary school education. He was admitted to the University College, Dar es Salaam, in Tanzania, where he graduated with a Bachelor of Laws degree in 1969. Later, he received a Diploma in Legal Practice, from the Law Development Centre in Kampala. In 1974, he achieved a Certificate in Development Studies from the University of Sussex, a Certificate in International Law from Geneva in 1975 and a Doctor of Law (LL.D) Degree (Honoris Causa) from the Commonwealth University Belize in London.

== Career before judgeship ==
He returned to Uganda after his studies in Tanzania. In 1969 he became an Advocate of the High Court of Uganda and was called to the Uganda Bar. The following year, he was appointed a State Attorney and was later promoted to Senior State Attorney a few years later. He also served as Director of the Uganda Law Development Centre.

== Career as a judge ==
In 1978, at the age of 35 years, he was appointed as a judge to the High Court of Uganda. From 1981 until 1984 was seconded to serve as the Director of Public Prosecutions. In 1986 he was appointed as a Justice of the Supreme Court of Uganda. From 1996 to 2000, he served as Chairman of the Judicial Service Commission. He became the Chief Justice of Uganda in 2001, serving in that capacity until his mandatory retirement at the age of 70 on 23 March 23, 2013. However, he served a three months extension until 23 June 2013. The extension was controversial and generated mixed reactions from the public. He formerly served as a Vice president/ Judge of the Administrative Tribunal of the African Development Bank and Judge of the Supreme Court of Eswatini.

== Family ==
He is married with to Veronica Odoki, and is the father of four children; Peter Odoki, Phillip Odoki, Dorah Odoki and Joshua Odoki.

== Other considerations ==
He at one time taught at Makerere University Faculty of Law and at the Law Development Centre. He served as the chairperson of the Editorial Board of the Uganda Law Reports. He has written a number of books and has published articles on a number of subjects, including constitutional development, human rights and criminal justice.

== Awards ==
In 2012 he received the Gusi Peace Prize International Award in Manila at the Philippine International Convention Centre for Social Justice and Humaritarian Law. He also has the Distinguished Jurist Award by the Nigerian Association of Democratic Lawyers.

== See also ==
- Government of Uganda
- Supreme Court of Uganda
