= Nabumali High School =

Secondary school in Uganda

Coordinates: 0.9840°N 34.2100°E

- Mbale, Mbale District; Uganda

Information
- Type: Public middle school and high school
- Motto: Onwards and Upwards
- Established: 1900
- Athletics: Football, basketball, cricket, athletics, rugby, volleyball, lawn tennis, table tennis, field hockey

Nabumali High School (NHS) is a mixed, boarding, secondary school in the Eastern Region of Uganda.

== Location ==
Nabumali High School is located in the village of Nabumali in Mbale District, off the Tororo–Mbale road, approximately 11 kilometres (6.8 mi), south of the city of Mbale. This location is at the foothills of Wanale, one of the mountain ranges that make up Mount Elgon.

== History ==
The school was founded by the former Church Missionary Society (now called Church Mission Society), a missionary sending body of the Anglican Church from the UK in 1900. Nabumali High School moved to its present location in 1912.

Members of various parishes within the Church of Uganda travelled long distances to congregate with each other and for special services, conferences, etc. in the school's chapel building.

Nabumali has a reputation for being one of the oldest schools in Uganda. The performance of the school was exemplary especially in the 1960s through the 1990s. During the 2000s, standards declined. However, beginning in the 2010s, an effort led by the school's alumni launched various initiatives aiming to revive the school's former results.

Over time the school had developed a reputation for quieter protests and more destructive strikes allegedly led by the then growing population of students from the neighboring Kenya who allegedly had high standards and expectations and were prone to volatile reactions for various reasons. For instance, in August 2004, a student strike occurred at the school in protest of the administration's alleged mishandling of their duties in relation to student welfare.

Because one of the buildings that was set ablaze by some students during the strike was the office block housing the office of the bursar, it is a common misconception to think that the student's held the finance office specifically responsible, but that was not the case. In reality, the dining hall and the administration block (which included the office of the bursar) were likely selected at random to be torched. They were the only 2 buildings to be burned, but classrooms, laboratories, and other buildings had their windows smashed in, and the school property was vandalized in various other ways.

== Etymology ==
According to a former acting headmaster in 2006, Israel Wabusela Walukhuli, the name "Nabumali" was a European mispronunciation of the name of a lady known as "Nabumati" since the land acquired for the school's site originally belonged to her.

== Historically notable administrators ==
- Canon Philip Bottomley
- Reverend W. A Crabtree
- Reverend H. K Banks
- Ronald Wareham
- Nasanaeri Gavamukulya
- Samuel Wasikye Mweru

== Notable alumni ==
- Alfonse Owiny-Dollo, Chief justice of Uganda.
- Catherine Bamugemerire - Ugandan Lawyer and Judge.
- Aggrey Awori – former Ugandan Minister of Information Technology and a former member of Uganda's Parliament
- Aggrey Jaden hi– Founding Father of the Republic of South Sudan and first South Sudanese to attain a degree South Sudan
- Ambassador Edith Grace Sempala
- John Garang – former vice president of Sudan and former leader of Southern Sudan
- James Wapakhabulo – former foreign minister of Uganda and speaker of parliament
- James Munange Ogoola – chairperson of the Judicial Service Commission – Uganda and former principal judge
- Robert Kabushenga - chief executive officer of the Vision Group-
- Beatrice Wabudeya
