= Uganda Management Institute =

Public university in Kampala, Uganda

Uganda Management Institute (UMI)
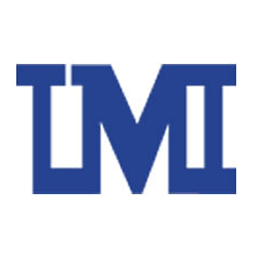
- Motto: Empowering You to Excel
- Type: Public
- Established: 1968; 58 years ago
- Academic affiliations: Open University of Tanzania
- Chairperson: Engr. Dr. Steven Paul Kagoda
- Chancellor: Bart Magunda Katureebe
- Location: Plot 44-52, Jinja Road, P.O. Box 20131, Kampala, Uganda; 00°19′16″N 32°35′52″E
- Campus: Urban
- Website: Homepage
- Location in Kampala

Uganda Management Institute (UMI) is a government-owned national center for training, research, and consultancy in the field of management and administration in Uganda. It is one of the nine public universities and degree-awarding institutions in the country outside the military.

== Location ==
UMI is located on the Kampala-Jinja Highway, approximately 3 kilometres (1.9 mi) east of the central business district, in Kampala, Uganda's largest and capital city. The geographical coordinates of UMI are: 0°19'16.0"N, 32°35'52.0"E (Latitude:0.321111; Longitude:32.597778).

== History ==
UMI began training operations in 1968 under the name Uganda Institute of Public Administration. The official opening of UMI was held on 7 October 1969. In the initial years, UMI was mandated to conduct intensive in-service training to quickly develop a cadre of Africans to assume higher responsibilities upon the attainment of independence in 1962.

In the early 1970s, UMI became affiliated with Makerere University, offering postgraduate diplomas in public administration and business management. The postgraduate diploma in human resource management was introduced in the mid 1980s.

Before 1992, the Institute of Public Administration operated as a department of the Ministry of Public Service. This status changed with the enactment of the Uganda Management Institute Statute of 1992. The statute conferred an agency status to UMI with a great degree of autonomy under a governing board. The programs of UMI were expanded and student intake increased. By 1999, UMI was offering a master's degree in management studies besides six postgraduate diplomas, certificate courses, and short courses.

== Schools ==
As of July 2014, UMI was structured into the following schools:

- School of Civil Service, Public Administration and Governance
- School of Business and Management
- School for Distance Learning and Information Technology
- School of Management Sciences
- Regional centres at Gulu, Mbale and Mbarara

== Outreach centers ==
UMI maintains an outreach center in the western Ugandan city of Mbarara, 260 km (160 mi) west of Kampala. The center is located in the Mbarara District Administration Building at Kamukuzi, Mbarara and offers various short courses and postgraduate diploma programs. Using state-of-the-art pedagogical technology, the center is linked to the main UMI campus in Kampala via a virtual face-to-face video conferencing facility that complements well with the programme delivery methods. In 2008, UMI established an outreach center in the city of Gulu in the Northern Region of Uganda. A third outreach center is located in the town of Mbale in the Eastern Region of Uganda, approximately 250 km (160 mi) by road northeast of Kampala.

== See also ==
- List of business schools in Uganda
- List of universities in Uganda
- Education in Uganda
