= Supreme Court of Uganda =

Highest court of Uganda

The Supreme Court of Uganda is the highest judicial organ in Uganda. It derives its powers from Article 130 of the 1995 Constitution. It is primarily an appellate court with original jurisdiction in only one type of case: a presidential election petition.

== Location ==
The Supreme Court Building is located at Plot 2, The Square, on Nakasero Hill. This is in the Central Division of Kampala, Uganda's capital and largest city. The coordinates of the Supreme Court Building are: 0°18'55.0"N, 32°34'47.0"E (Latitude:0.315278; Longitude:32.579722).

== Overview ==
The Supreme Court is headed by the chief justice and has ten other justices. The quorum required for a court decision varies depending on the type of case under consideration. When hearing a constitutional appeal, the required quorum is seven justices. In a criminal or a civil appeal, only five justices are required for a quorum.

In the absence of the chief justice, the most senior member of the court presides. The court sits eight sessions a year with a break of two weeks between sessions to conduct research and write judgments. It has the power to uphold, reverse, substitute its judgment, or order a new trial when hearing an appeal from a lower court.

== Composition ==
As of 20 April 2026, the following justices sat on the Supreme Court:

1. Flavian Zeija, Chief Justice of Uganda
2. Esther Mayambala Kitimbo Kisaakye
3. Lillian Tibatemwa-Ekirikubinza
4. Percy Night Tuhaise
5. Michael Chibita
6. Elizabeth Musoke
7. Stephen Musota
8. Christopher Izama Madrama
9. Catherine Bamugemereire
10. Monica Kalyegira Mugenyi
11. Muzamiru Mutangula Kibeedi

== Cases heard ==
Among the controversial cases heard by the Supreme Court was in 2008 when the validity of the death penalty was contested. The case was heard on appeal from the constitutional court. The main appellant was Susan Kigula who has since lost her appeal against her own death sentence for murdering her husband.

Other cases include four of the last five presidential election petitions in which the court ruled 3:2 in 2001, 4:3 in 2006, 5:4 in 2011, and 9:0 in 2016 in favor of President Yoweri Museveni's re-election.

== List of chief justices ==
=== Republic of Uganda ===
- Since 2026 Flavian Zeija
- 2020 - 2026 Alfonse Owiny-Dollo
- 2015 – 2020 Bart Magunda Katureebe
- 2013 – 2015 Steven Kavuma (acting)
- 2001 – 2013 Benjamin Josses Odoki
- 1986 – 2001 Samuel Wako Wambuzi
- 1985 – 1986 Peter Allen
- 1980 – 1985 George Masika
- 1979 – 1980 Samuel Wako Wambuzi
- 1975 – 1979 Mohammed Saied
- 1972 – 1975 Samuel Wako Wambuzi
- 1971 – 1972 Benedicto Kiwanuka
- 1969 – 1971 Dermot Joseph Sheridan
- 1963 – 1969 Egbert Udo Udoma
- 1962 – 1963 K. G. Bennet (acting)

=== Uganda Protectorate ===
- 1956 – 1962 Audley McKisack
- 1952 – 1956 John Bowes Griffin
- 1947 – 1952 David Edwards
- 1937 – 1947 Norman Whitley
- 1935 – 1937 Robert Evans Hall
- 1935 John Harry Barclay Nihill (acting)
- 1933 – 1934 Sidney Solomon Abrahams
- 1921 – 1932 Charles James Griffin
- 19nn – 1920 William Morris Carter

== See also ==
- Politics of Uganda
- Court of Appeal of Uganda
- High Court of Uganda
