= Court of Appeal of Uganda =

Second-highest court of Uganda

Court of Appeal of Uganda Constitutional Court
- Established: 1995
- Jurisdiction: Uganda
- Location: Kampala, Uganda
- Authorised by: Constitution of Uganda
- Appeals to: Supreme Court of Uganda
- Number of positions: 15

Deputy Chief Justice of Uganda
- Currently: Flavian Zeija
- Since: 2020

The Court of Appeal of Uganda (also constituted as the Constitutional Court of Uganda) is the second-highest judicial organ in Uganda. It derives its powers from Article 134 of the 1995 Constitution. It is an appellate court when hearing cases appealed from the High Court of Uganda. However, it has original jurisdiction when adjudicating matters relating to the constitutionality of matters before it. All judgments by the Court of Appeal are theoretically appealable to the Supreme Court of Uganda, if the Supreme Court decides to hear the appeal.

== Location ==
The Court of Appeal of Uganda is located at Plot 2, The Square, Nakasero, in the Central Division of Kampala, the capital and largest city in Uganda. The geographical coordinates of the offices of the Uganda Court of Appeal are: 0°18'57.0"N, 32°34'45.0"E (Latitude: Longitude:0.315833; Longitude:32.579167).

== Overview ==
The Court of Appeal of Uganda is headed by the deputy chief justice and has fourteen other justices. The quorum required for a court decision varies depending on the matters under consideration. When sitting as an appellate court in a civil or criminal matter, the required quorum is an odd number of justices, not less than three in number. When sitting to consider a constitutional matter, quorum is achieved by an odd number of justices, not less than five. In Uganda, the Deputy Chief Justice is not a member of the Supreme Court.

== Composition ==
The Justices of the Court of Appeal of Uganda are headed by the Deputy Chief Justice of Uganda. The following are the justices of the Court of Appeal of Uganda, as of 20 April 2026:

1. Moses Kazibwe Kawumi (Deputy Chief Justice)
2. Geoffrey Kiryabwire
3. Fredrick Martin Stephen Egonda-Ntende
4. Cheborion Barishaki
5. Hellen Abulu Obura
6. Irene Mulyagonja
7. Christopher Gashirabake
8. Eva Luswata
9. Oscar Kihika
10. Margaret Tibulya
11. Asa Mugyenyi
12. Musa Ssekaana
13. Cornelia Sabiiti Kakooza
14. Stella Alibateese
15. Florence Nakachwa
16. Jesse Rugyema Byaruhanga
17. John Mike Musisi
18. Keturah Kitarisiibwa Katunguka
19. Esta Nambayo.

=== Other justices of the Uganda Court of Appeal ===
1. Simon Mugenyi Byabakama (On secondment to Uganda Electoral Commission)

== List of deputy chief justices ==
List of Deputy Chief Justices of Uganda
| Rank | Name of Justice | Term in Office |
|---|---|---|
| 1 | Seth Manyindo | until 2001 |
| 2 | Laeticia Kikonyogo | 2001 until 2010 |
| 3 | Elizabeth Mpagi Bahigeine | 2010 until 2012 |
| 4 | Constance Byamugisha | 2012 until 2013 |
| 5 | Steven Kavuma | 2015 until 2017 |
| 6 | Alfonse Owiny-Dollo | 2017 until 2020 |
| 7 | Richard Buteera | 2020 until 2025 |
| 8 | Flavian Zeija | April 2025 - January 2026 |
| 9 | Moses Kawumi Kazibwe | Since May 2026 |

== See also ==
- Politics of Uganda
- Supreme Court of Uganda
- High Court of Uganda
