= Law Development Centre =

Legal school in Uganda

Law Development Centre (LDC)
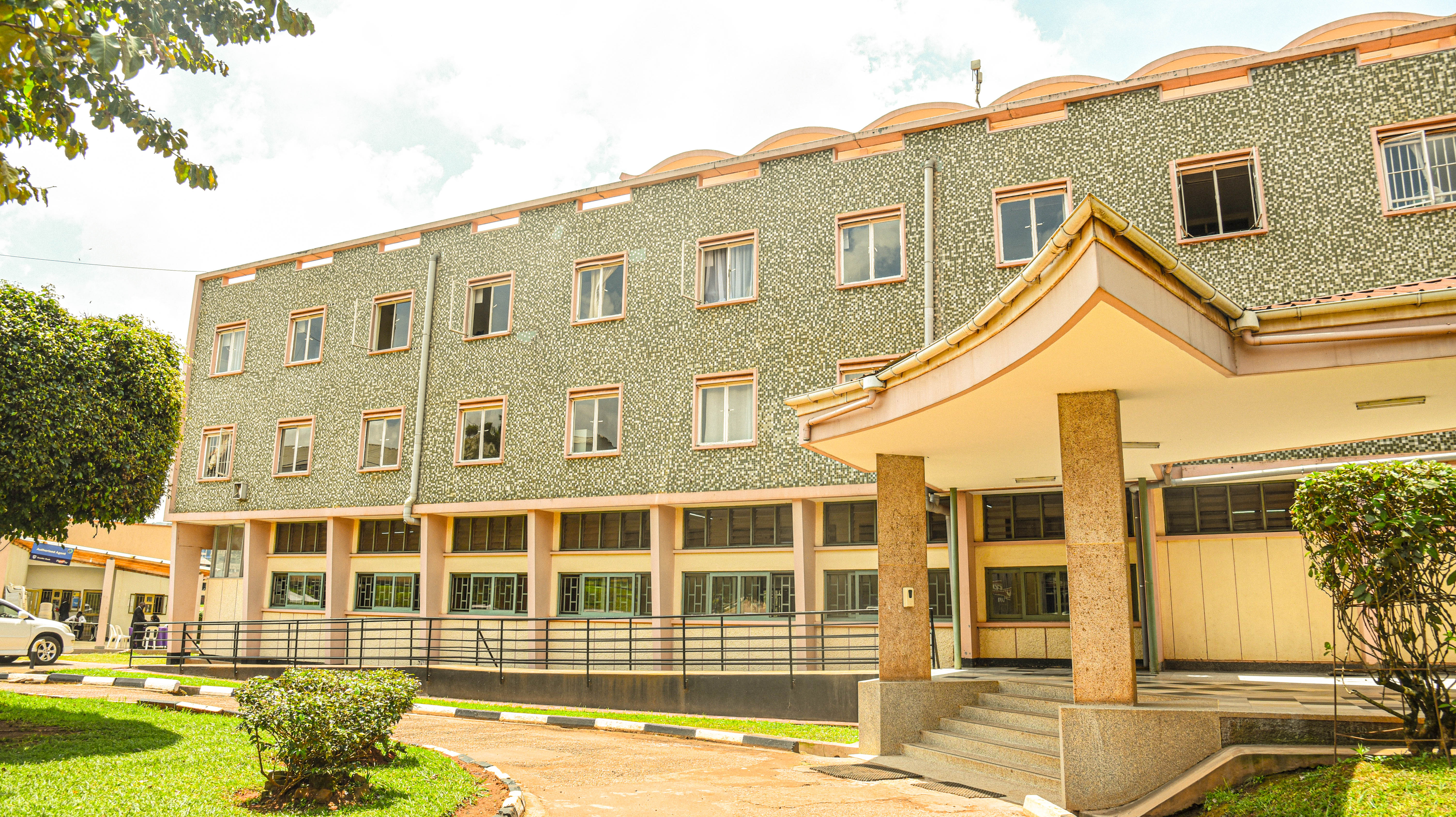
- The Main Building of the Law Development Centre Kampala, Campus
- Motto: A Tradition of Legal Excellence
- Type: Public
- Established: 1970
- Director: Frank Nigel Othembi
- Administrative staff: 50+
- Students: 2000+
- Location: Kampala, Uganda; 00°19′28″N 32°34′07″E
- Campus: Urban
- Website: www.ldc.ac.ug
- Location within Kampala

The Law Development Centre (LDC) is an educational institution in Uganda for higher learning that offers various legal courses ranging from one month to one year.

== Overview ==
The LDC is the only institution in Uganda that offers the Bar Course leading to the award of the post-graduate Diploma in Legal Practice. In the early 2000s, the LDC was plagued by a high failure rate among students, as high as 90 percent in some years. The LDC, together with the Ministry of Justice and Constitutional Affairs and the Uganda Law Society, have designed changes that include a pre-admission written examination for students, continuing education requirements for LDC lecturers, and instruction in teaching methods for all academic staff. The LDC library has also been updated with written literature as well as increased Internet access for students.

== Location ==
The LDC is located on Makerere Hill along Gadafi Road, just outside the southern perimeter of the main campus of Makerere University. This is less than 1 kilometre (0.62 mi) south of the Faculty of Law at Makerere University and approximately 3.5 kilometres (2 mi), by road, north-west of Kampala's central business district. The coordinates of the LDC campus are 0°19'28.0"N, 32°34'07.0"E (Latitude:0.324444; Longitude:32.568611).

In 2018, the government of Uganda approved plans to establish regional campuses of the LDC in the Eastern Ugandan town of Mbale, Western Region, Mbarara and Northern Region, Lira. The Mbarara campus was established and operationalized effective in the 2018/2019 financial year.

== History ==
The LDC was established in 1970 by the Law Development Centre Act as a government-owned institution of higher learning responsible for "research, law reform, publications, law reporting and community legal services". LDC has a management committee that is responsible for policy formulation. Those policies are implemented by the director through various institutional departments. The first director of the LDC was Kutlu Fuad. He was succeeded in 1972 by Francis Muzingu Ssekandi, who was later elevated to the High Court in 1974 and in 1978 to Uganda's first Court of Appeals, later renamed the Uganda Supreme Court. The current director is Frank Nigel Othembi.

== Administration ==
Administratively, the LDC is divided into the following departments:

(a) Library Department (b) Library Publishers Department (c) Finance Department (d) Department of Research and Publications (e) Legal Education & Legal Aid (f) Department of Law Reporting (g) Department of Law

The current eligible Ugandan universities whose law students are allowed to join the LDC includes the following:

- Uganda Christian University
- Makerere University
- Cavendish University Uganda
- Kampala University
- Kampala International University
- Nkumba University
- Islamic University in Uganda
- International University of East Africa

== Courses ==
As of July 2014, the courses offered at the Law Development Centre included the following: core and major subjects are :Criminal Procedure, Civil Procedure, Commercial Law, Land Transaction Law, Domestic & Family Law. Other subjects include: Art of Advocacy, Judicial Conduct, Professional Ethics, Legislative Drafting & Accountancy for Lawyers. The center employs full-time academic staff and also uses the services of several visiting professionals and people with experience who are drawn from among a wide selection of members of the Ugandan professional legal community.

1. Post-Graduate Diploma in Legal Practice - This twelve-months course is also called "The Bar Course". It is offered to graduates of Ugandan and recognized law schools, prior to enrollment as an advocate and authorization to practice law in Uganda.
2. The Diploma in Law - This one-year course is designed to train paralegals in the basic principles of law. Participants are mainly from the army, police, prisons, local government, and other government departments. The course is also open to anyone who holds the Uganda Advanced Certificate of Education who wishes to enhance their opportunities for further studies in law and employment.
3. Other Courses - The LDC will, from time to time, organize short courses, lasting anywhere from one to six months, for lawyers and non-lawyers in specific aspects of the law, as the need arises.

== Notable alumni ==
Notable alumni include:

- Rebecca Kadaga
- Bart Magunda Katureebe
- Steven Kavuma
- Sam Kutesa
- Erias Lukwago
- Norbert Mao
- Kiddu Makubuya
- Charles Mayiga
- Nobel Mayombo
- Amama Mbabazi
- David Muhoozi
- Jim Muhwezi
- James Mugira
- Jennifer Musisi
- Isaac Musumba
- Adolf Mwesige
- Hope Mwesigye
- James Nangwala
- Joe Oloka-Onyango
- Fred Ruhindi
- Julia Sebutinde
- Edward Ssekandi
- Sylvia Tamale
- David Tinyefunza
- Henry Tumukunde
- Samuel Awich, Justice of the Supreme Court of Belize
- Frank Nigel Othembi
- Moses Muhangi
- Mwanje Gideon

== See also ==
- Education in Uganda
