= Legal practice =

Legal practice is sometimes used to distinguish the body of judicial or administrative precedents, rules, policies, customs, and doctrines from legislative enactments such as statutes and constitutions, which might be called "laws" in the strict sense of being commands to the general public rather than only to a set of parties.

== England from Henry II ==
=== Common law forms of pleading: writs ===
In the legal practice that emerged in royal courts under Henry II any case had to fit into a narrowly defined form of pleading usually called a "writ". By the time of Henry III the number of such writs had grown to over 500, but even that many did not cover all the possible claims that people sought to make. The Provisions of Oxford in 1258 forbade the royal clerks to create any new writs. The result of this was that the courts began to adopt "fictions" such as imaginary parties or actors so that the facts of a case could be fit within one of the established forms, and the Writ of Trespass came to become the catchall form for most claims. Unlike much current practice, the writs of pleading were not court orders granting relief but the summons, prepared by the plaintiff, filed with the court, and served on the respondent.

== United States ==
=== U.S. Constitution ===
The non-conflicting parts of the English and American common law and its forms of pleading were explicitly incorporated into the U.S. Constitution. The Seventh Amendment to the U.S. Constitution reads: "In Suits at common law, where the value in controversy shall exceed twenty dollars, the right of trial by jury shall be preserved, and no fact tried by a jury, shall be otherwise re-examined in any Court of the United States, than according to the rules of the common law."

=== 1848 Field Code ===
By the middle of the 19th century, strong resistance developed to the rigidities of the common law forms of pleading brought over from England, whose monarchical forms often conflicted with U.S. republican law that made the people the sovereign. New York State was the first to adopt a codification of legal forms and procedures, called the Field Code from its principal author, David Dudley Field II. Within a few years, most but not all other states adopted similar codes. One of the reforms made was to unite courts of law and equity. The reforms made it easier to get a case started without loading most of the argument and proof at the outset, and made discovery more important during the course of the case. However, there was opposition to the reforms, and resistance from the legal profession, including judges, that prevented the codes from being implemented as intended.

=== 1938 Federal Rules ===
Before the Federal Rules of Civil Procedure (FRCP) were enacted in 1938, common law pleading was more formal, traditional, and particular in its phrases and requirements. For example, a plaintiff bringing a trespass suit would have to mention certain key words in his complaint or risk it being dismissed with prejudice. In contrast, the FRCP is based on a legal construction called notice pleading, which is less formal, created and modified by legal experts, and far less technical in requirements. In notice pleading, the same plaintiff bringing suit would not face dismissal for lack of the exact legal term, so long as the claim itself was legally actionable. The policy behind this change is to simply give "notice" of your grievances, and leave the details for later in the case. This acts in the interest of equity by concentrating on the actual law and not the exact construction of pleas. Thirty-five states have adopted versions of the federal rules as their own procedural code.

In addition to notice pleading, a minority of states (e.g., California) use an intermediate system known as code pleading. Code pleading is an older system than notice pleading and is based on legislative statute. It tends to straddle the gulf between obsolete common-law pleading and modern notice pleading. Code pleading places additional burdens on a party to plead the "ultimate facts" of its case, laying out the party's entire case and the facts or allegations underlying it. Notice pleading, by contrast, simply requires a "short and plain statement" showing only that the pleader is entitled to relief. (FRCP 8(a)(2)). One important exception to this rule is that when a party alleges fraud, that party must plead the facts of the alleged fraud with particularity. (FRCP 9(b)). There has been some controversy over whether the FCRP violate the Eighth Amendment requirement of common law rules, but the usual answer has been that the changes are only in form and not in substance.

== See also ==
- Customary law
- Legal doctrine
- Precedent (stare decisis)
- Public policy doctrine
- Regime
