= Fatuma Ndangiza =

Rwandan civil servant, policy expert and politician

- Born: 1968 (age 56–57); Uganda
- Other names: Fatuma Nyirakobwa Ndangiza, Fatuma Ndangiza Nyirakobwa
- Occupation(s): Civil servant, women's rights advocate, policy expert, politician
- Years active: 1990–present

Fatuma Ndangiza (born 1968) is a women's rights advocate, policy expert, and politician. As of January 2024, she is serving her second term as a Rwandan member of the East African Legislative Assembly. Born and raised in a refugee camp in Uganda, she returned to Rwanda during the civil war. Initially she settled in Byumba and led the SOS Ramira initiative to assist women and children in acquiring basic supplies and treatment to meet their needs. When the Rwandan Patriotic Front took control of Kigali, she moved to the capital and began working in the Ministry for Women and Family Promotion to provide support and relief to survivors and victims of the Rwandan genocide. She helped to create the National Women's Council and its regional and local frameworks to empower women to help them achieve political and economic parity through legal change and advocacy. She worked with the women's ministry until 2002.

Ndangiza led the National Unity and Reconciliation Commission from 2002 to 2009. The goals of the commission were to analyse systems that had created divisions in the past, to confront systemic issues and to create state reforms for reshaping Rwanda's socio-political identity while protecting the human rights of all citizens. She served as Rwandan ambassador to Tanzania from 2009 and was simultaneously appointed as the first Rwandan ambassador to the Seychelles in 2010. Between 2012 and 2017, Ndangiza was the Deputy chief executive officer of the Rwanda Governance Board. In 2012, she was appointed by chairman Ellen Johnson Sirleaf to serve on the African Peer Review Forum's Panel of Eminent Persons, which she chaired for a two-year term from 2014 to 2016. Both the Rwanda Governance Board and Panel of Eminent Persons are policy review mechanisms to ensure that development is sustainable and falls within a human rights framework. Ndangiza was elected as one of Rwanda's nine members of the East African Legislative Assembly, the regional legislative body, in 2017. She was elected to a second term in 2022. Her goals during her tenure were to integrate the policies and procedures of the independent nation members to facilitate consistency and coordination across the region.

== Early life and education ==
Fatuma Ndangiza Nyirakobwa was born in 1968, in a refugee camp in Uganda. (Note: Self-published site, however the author, Fred Muvunyi is a journalist working for Deutsche Welle and previously served as the chair of the Rwanda Media Commission, the national media regulatory agency.) Her family was Muslim, and she grew up in Uganda. Many Rwandan Tutsis raised in refugee camps in Uganda wanted to move to Rwanda, but President Juvénal Habyarimana (term 1973–1994) prevented their return. In 1986, some of the refugees formed the Rwandan Patriotic Front, and began demanding the right to resettle in Rwanda. They formed a militia and in October 1990, began marching towards Kigali, beginning the Rwandan Civil War. By the end of the year, most of the territory around Byumba was controlled by the Rwandan Patriotic Front, which had become the centre for refuge efforts as people were brought there from other parts of the country for medical treatment. Ndangiza joined the relief teams organised in Uganda and followed the troops to Byumba.

== Career ==
=== Women's rights and protections (1990s–2002) ===
In Byumba, Ndangiza started a programme called SOS Ramira (from kuramira, meaning to save). She worked with other women to help returnees, survivors, orphans and other displaced children to find clothes, basic medicines, food, and other essentials. When the government began setting up social agencies they turned their attention to teaching people skills such as carpentry, farming, and sewing, so that they could earn an income. When the Rwandan Patriotic Front took control of Kigali, Ndangiza made her way to the capital city. She worked with Aloisea Inyumba, the Minister for Women and Family Promotion, on issues that women were facing as a result of the war. There was no existing structure for the Ministry, which had previously served as a propaganda mechanism for the war. Those who had to rebuild it from the ground up, were unpaid for the first year, while trying to provide urgently needed support and relief to survivors and victims of the Rwandan genocide. As had been the case in Byumba, initially the needs were for clothing, medical supplies, and basic necessities. This soon shifted to helping and training women to find employment. In 1995, Ndangiza served as the coordinator between the Ministry for Women and Family Promotion and UNICEF.

Ndangiza became chair of a task force to create a National Women's Council, with the goal of uniting women and helping them move past their differences and work together on development and empowerment. Their strategic planning sessions discussed how to increase women's participation in decision making and economic initiatives, while cultivating allies in the transitional legislature. The structure decided upon was a national council acting as an umbrella network for provincial, district, sectional, and local councils through which their concerns and needs could be filtered. The goal was to organise and prepare women throughout the country to become advocates for themselves, so that they would be ready to press for their rights when the first post-genocide elections occurred. The first elections to the councils were held locally in 1996. One of the women's first tasks was to review existing legislation which disadvantaged women and discriminated against them. Calling together legal analysts and gender experts, the councils made proposals to change laws such as those preventing women from inheriting property. As the genocide had created many women-led households, it was important to prevent any possibility of distant male relatives taking over their homes and the land they needed to feed their families.

Other reforms Ndangiza worked on included a woman's right to control and administer her own assets, to open a bank account, to have joint control with her husband if they were married, to obtain a divorce, and for the children to derive nationality maternally. There were also efforts to pass legislation against family violence and child rape. Because of the large number of orphans and displaced children in the country, Ndangiza worked to establish a foster care and adoption system. Initially the Ministry for Women and Family Promotion organised orphanages to receive displaced street children and refugees returning from places like the Congo. As most of the children were too young to remember their families, they did not know if they were Hutu or Tutsi, which made it easier for them to come together without the knowledge of the history of ethnic conflicts. Recognising that orphanages deprived children of a family setting, they launched the Shelter for Women programme, which aimed to provide housing for women, including returnees and widows, so that they could bring children into their homes. She worked with Inyumba until 1999 and then with her successor Angelina Muganza until 2002.

=== Policy development and monitoring (2002–2009) ===
Inyumba had moved on to serve as executive secretary for the National Unity and Reconciliation Commission and Ndangiza succeeded her in 2002. The executive secretary was responsible for leading the commission. The goal of the commission was to confront the issues of the country's past and chart a united path forward through education and with a rights-based agenda. The commission evaluated systems which had led to past divisions and instituted reforms to state structures to reshape Rwanda's socio-political identity. Beginning in 2001, state institutions were decentralised to give more autonomy to local and regional governments. At the local level, committees were elected and represented on a council at the district level, governed by mayors and deputy mayors. A 2006 reform replaced the executive committees and councils with paid administrators to eliminate favouritism and increase transparency. The new executive secretaries were required to undergo an annual performance review to determine if they were meeting upward goals at the national level and downward goals in the local communities. In addition, the commission created curricula for schools that would promote peace and reconciliation and introduced conflict resolution training under a civic education initiative for university students, released prisoners from the genocide, and the general public. Annually, a National Summit for Reconciliation was held to allow representatives of all levels of society, including educators, religious leaders, and NGO administrators to offer observations and suggestions for the future. Ndangiza led the National Unity and Reconciliation Commission until 2009, when she was replaced by Jean Baptiste Habyarimana.

=== Regional governance posts (2009–2023) ===
In October 2009, Ndangiza was appointed as the Rwandan ambassador to Tanzania and moved to Dar es Salaam. Simultaneously, she became the first ambassador from Rwanda to the Seychelles in 2010. Among the issues she focused upon were increasing trade and transportation systems, promoting tourism, and decreasing piracy. She was recalled in October 2011, and the following January was appointed as the deputy chief executive officer of the Rwanda Governance Board, an institution which monitors and regulates policy of public and private institutions and organisations. That month, she became a member of the African Peer Review Forum's Panel of Eminent Persons, a group which monitors and promotes policies and procedures leading to political stability, sustainable development and economic growth, while supporting cooperation throughout Africa with a focus on human rights. Under her leadership, the Rwanda Governance Board sought to implement programmes to shift economic development and financial security from the central government to local institutions by establishing regional training and coaching programmes to build the skills for local leaders to better plan, monitor, and develop their own goals for growth and self-reliance. Ndangiza led the board until 2017, when she was succeeded by Usta Kayitesi. In 2014, she became the chair of the Panel of Eminent Persons, serving a two-year term. She continued to be a member of the panel after completing her term as chair, and led the team of experts who worked on assisting South Sudan's integration into the East African Community when it was admitted for membership in 2016.

Ndangiza continued to be involved in women's issues supporting initiatives like the Girls Leadership Forum, a university student initiative that develops women for leadership roles and promotes sex and reproductive health education to combat unwanted pregnancy. As one of the speakers at the 2014 Women in the World Summit held at New York City's Lincoln Center, she spoke about how Rwanda had become a leader of women's representation in governance, with 63 per cent of the members of parliament being women. To achieve those levels of representation, she stressed that countries had to build spaces that allowed women to feel safe and able to speak. That year, she helped organise a pan-African conference, Silencing the Guns: Women in Democratisation and Peace Building in Africa sponsored by the African Union in Kigali. The purpose of the conference was to explore the causes of conflict and violence, and to recommend pathways to maintaining peace through the lens of gender. She advocated for educational programmes which included men in advancing women's rights. When the HeForShe Campaign was launched in 2015, she stressed the importance of men becoming advocates for women's issues noting that success for developmental goals they wanted to achieve would be harder to reach if half of the population was not engaged or participating. Ndangiza was chosen by Nkosazana Dlamini-Zuma, the first woman to chair the African Union Commission, to lead the first ever all-woman election observer mission for the African Union. The first election they oversaw was the September 2016 parliamentary election in the Seychelles.

In 2017, Ndangiza was elected as one of Rwanda's nine members on the East African Legislative Assembly (EALA), a regional legislative body for the nations of Burundi, Kenya, Rwanda, Tanzania, Uganda, and South Sudan. She was appointed to serve on the Legal Rules and Privileges Standing Committee in 2018, and elected as its chair. She also served on the Committee on Regional Affairs and Conflict Resolution, and was elected chair in 2021. One of the bills she helped shepherd through approval was aimed at integrating the oaths taken for the institutions of the East African Community, such as for the East African Court of Justice, as the member nations have differing legal systems and requirements. She was part of a team of members of the EALA Parliament who visited Burundi in 2018 in an attempt to begin repairing the Burundi–Rwanda relations, which had been deteriorating for several years. That year she also participated in the deliberations of the EALA weighing whether the assembly should take a more active part in the stalled peace talks underway at the Intergovernmental Authority on Development with regard to South Sudan. Other legislation Ndangiza supported were against gender-based violence, genocide, human trafficking, and terrorism. She also put forward a measure with Mary Mugyenyi of Uganda for the upcoming elections to require member nations to nominate candidates with a balanced gender slate.

One of the first initiatives of 2022 that Ndangiza supported was the creation of an East African Legislative Assembly's Women Caucus. Fatuma Ibrahim Ali (Kenya), Wanjiku Muhia (Kenya) and Pamela Simon Maassay (Tanzania) brought the motion and discussion to the floor, which was supported by the MPs. Ndangiza was elected as the Secretary-General of EALA Women Caucus. In December, she was elected to a second term in the EALA, on a slate of members from Rwanda which included six women for its nine posts. She was also elected to serve on the EALA Commission through 2025. The commission, which has two members from each of seven nations, serves as the administrative organ of the assembly, setting its schedule, nominating committee members, and managing its business. She and Mo-Mamo Karerwa of Burundi where the only women elected to the commission. Critical issues supported by Ndangiza in the term included the ratification of protocols and implementation of laws to further the integration of the East African Community, such as shared economic and budgetting processes, import/export regulations and tariffs, information and technology, legal jurisdictions for the East African Court of Justice, meteorological services, and foreign policy coordination. Ndangiza stressed that foreign policy cooperation was a critical component in instances where one member nation did not have diplomatic relations abroad, but another member state did and could act to represent the diplomatic interests of the other. She stated that the protocols were inter-dependent, meaning that for example, a single currency for the East African Community could not be moved forward without integration of the underlying customs regulations and implementation of common market policies. In 2023 and 2024, she worked on a health initiative aimed at improving health services through integration of privacy protections, broadening access to high-quality health services, and using shared technology to reach the goal of universal health coverage throughout the region by 2030.
