= Fatuma =

Fatuma is a given name. Notable people with the name include:

- Fatuma Abdulkadir Adan, Kenyan lawyer and peace ambassador
- Fatuma Abdullahi Insaniya, Somali diplomat
- Fatuma Ali Saman, Kenyan educationist and women's rights campaigner
- Fatuma binti Yusuf al-Alawi, queen of Unguja in pre-Sultanate Zanzibar
- Fatuma Gedi, Kenyan politician
- Fatuma Ibrahim Ali, Kenyan politician
- Fatuma Masito, Kenyan politician
- Fatuma Ndangiza, (born 1968), Rwandan policy expert and politician
- Fatuma Roba, Ethiopian long-distance runner
- Fatuma Sado, Ethiopian long-distance runner

== See also ==
- Fatima
