= Martin Ngoga =

Rwandan Lawyer and politician

The Right Honourable Martin Ngoga

Rwanda Ambassador in Kenya
- Incumbent
- Assumed office March 24, 2023

Speaker of the East African Legislative Assembly
- Incumbent
- Assumed office 2017

Personal details
- Born: Martin Karoli Ngoga Rwanda
- Occupation: Lawyer/Politician

Martin Karoli Ngoga is a Rwandan lawyer and politician, ex-speaker for the East African Legislative Assembly. He is also a former Prosecutor General of Rwanda and Special Representative to the International Criminal Tribunal for Rwanda.

Ngoga currently serves as the Ambassador and Permanent Representative of the Republic of Rwanda to the United Nations, a role he assumed in May 2025.

He is the deputy chairperson of the FIFA Ethics Committee in charge of the investigatory chamber.

In 2019, during his meeting with speaker of the Parliament of Tanzania, Job Yustino Ndugai they decided to speedily embrace the Monetary Union, whose common currency would stipulate stability and with a stable exchange rate in the East African region, after EALA had passed two key pieces of legislation the East African Monetary Institute Bill, 2018 and the EAC Statistics Bill, 2017.

He joined EALA after beating Jennifer Wibabara, whom they were both fronted by the ruling Rwanda Patriotic Front (RPF-Inkotanyi) for legislators to choose whom to send to Eala to replace MP Abdul Karim Harelimana, who had resigned.

In 2019, the East African Court of Justice, under Lady Justice Monica Mugenyi dismissed an application filed by Burundi that was challenging his election as a speaker in December 2017, saying that Rwanda boycotted the elections according to EALA rules of Procedures and the tenets of East African Community Treaty.

He recently urged the community member states to put possible measures to have a common approach on COVID-19 pandemic such that citizens can continue to enjoy the benefits of integration.

In 2019, Ngoga was allegedly reported that he had paid some media houses in the region like NTV and NBS Television to defame the Secretary General of EAC and the Burundian Ambassador in Tanzania, Libérat Mfumukeko that he had swindled the EAC funds.

On 8 August 2007, as the Attorney General of the Republic of Rwanda, addressed indictment and arrest warrant on one of genocide leaders Fabien Neretse to France through Interpol, requesting his extradition.
