= Lorna Magara =

Ugandan educator and administrator

- Born: Lorna Magara; 1966 (age 59–60); Uganda
- Education: Makerere University (Bachelor of Arts with Education); Uganda Christian University (Master of Arts in Organizational Leadership and Management); Institute of National Transformation (Oak Seed Executive Leadership Course); Sundoulos African Leadership Training Institute (Certificate of Servant Leadership); Christian Education, Europe (International Certificate of Christian Education)
- Occupations: Educator, academic, and management professional
- Years active: 1989 - present
- Title: Chairperson of Makerere University Council
- Spouse: Dr. James Magara

Lorna Magara is the first woman to be elected chairperson of the Makerere University Council, since the founding of the university in 1922. She was elected to a renewable four-year term, effective 20 December 2018. The Council is a 27-member body that serves as the supreme governing organ of Uganda's largest and oldest public university.

== Background and education ==
She was born to Hezron and Catherine Kakuyo in 1966 and spent most of her childhood in Jinja. After attending Victoria and Berkley primary schools, both in eastern Uganda, for her primary education, she then joined Gayaza High School for all six years of her secondary education Ms Magara was admitted to Makerere University in 1985, where she graduated with a Bachelor of Arts degree with a concurrent Diploma in Education, in 1988.

Her second degree is a Master of Arts in Organizational Leadership and Management, awarded by Uganda Christian University, in Mukono District. In addition, she has several certificates in leadership and education from local and international institutions.

== Career ==
During the first six years of her career, from 1989 until 1995, Ms Magara was a human resource officer at Uganda National Social Security Fund (NSSF). In this capacity, she was part of the team that established the training department and manpower planning unit at NSSF.

After that, she went into private consulting and serves as the Director at Destiny Consult Limited, a private consultancy that provided leadership training programs. This phase of her career lasted 12 years, until 2008.

In 2008 she became a faculty member at African Kingdom Business Forum (AKBF), a personnel development consultancy that provides leadership training programs. She also started working as a member of the faculty at Sundolous African Leadership Training Program (SALT), another human resources and training consultancy.

She is expected to serve a renewable four-year term as Chairperson of Makerere University Council and will be deputized by Daniel Kidega, the former speaker of the East African Legislative Assembly.

== Other considerations ==
Ms Magara is the founder and Principal of Vine International Christian Academy, a school with grades from Pre-School to Grade 12, located in Kungu, Kira Municipality, Wakiso District, Buganda Region, Uganda.

She is a Director at Jubilee Dental Limited, a company that operates three dental clinics in Uganda and one in Kigali, Rwanda. She is the Africa Representative of Accelerated Education Enterprise, Uganda Chapter; Team Leader of Education Accelerators Uganda Limited. She is the Uganda Coordinator for International Certificate for Christian Education.

== Personal life ==
Lorna Magara is married to Dr. James Magara and the couple has four children between them, three boys and one girl. She is also sister to Allen Kagina, Jocelyn Kyobutungi Rugunda (wife to Uganda's Prime Minister Ruhakana Rugunda ) as well as Caleb Kakuyo, the former Chief Commercial Officer at the National Housing and Construction Company, among others

== Succession table as Chairperson of Makerere University Council ==
Preceded by Dr Charles Wana Etyem; 2010 - 2018	Chairperson; Makerere University Council; December 2018 – December 2022	Succeeded by TBD (After December 2022)
