= Josephine Lemoyan =

Tanzanian sociologist and politician

- Born: Josephine Sebastian
- Other names: Josephine S. Lemoyan, Josephine Sebastian Lemoyan
- Occupations: Sociologist, WASH administrator, politician
- Years active: 1980–present
- Spouse: Husein Ole Lemoyani Laizer (died 2018)

Josephine Lemoyan is a Tanzanian sociologist, social services analyst, and politician. She is a member of the Maasai people. After completing degrees in social sciences at the University of Dar es Salaam in Tanzania, and the University of Hull, in England, she specialised in WASH (water, sanitation and hygiene) systems from the early 1990s. Working with governments and NGOs, she advised on wastewater treatment facilities and water and soil conservation. In 2017, she was elected as one of the Tanzanian Members of Parliament for the East African Legislative Assembly (EALA). She served on the EALA's Commission, which oversees the body's administrative functions and served on the committee to evaluate projects and facilities that support the East African Community's common market and custom's union integration. As a member of the Committee on Regional Affairs and Conflict Resolution, she worked on legislation to integrate regional laws on livestock movement, trade, and to protect the ecosystems and safe and secure movement of people and goods on Lakes Tanganyika and Victoria.

== Early life, education, and family ==
Josephine Sebastian is a member of a Maasai clan and was raised with traditional Maasai values. She earned a Bachelor of Arts with honours and a Master of Arts from the University of Dar es Salaam in sociology. Continuing her education at the University of Hull in Kingston upon Hull, England, she earned a Master of Science in applied social research, sociology and social anthropology. In 1980, she married Hussein Ole Lemoyani Laizer and they had two children, Benjuda Hussein and Noela Lemoyan. Her husband died in 2018.

== Career ==
Lemoyan's expertise is in WASH (water, sanitation and hygiene) systems. From the early 1990s, she worked with various rural and urban councils, and NGOs such as the Danish International Development Agency (Danida), to evaluate public service projects. In 2009, she was one of the featured speakers at a conference held in Forlì, Italy, by the International Women's Network and the Hannah Arendt School of Politics, where she spoke about water and soil conservation projects in Tanzania. In 2016, Lemoyan, a senior facilitator with the NGO Action For Development (AFORD) worked with the Ministry of Water and Irrigation on a feasibility study for building a wastewater treatment plant in Dar es Salaam to recycle wastewater for industrial and irrigation applications. She cited that the difficulties in providing fully accessible water to all sectors of society were that the present system was not equally available to rural and urban settings, had previously not been well managed, and that commitments from local communities and donors had not been met. She was one of the experts who were consulted during the creation of the Tanzanian "Code of Practice for the Application of Small-Scale, Decentralised Wastewater Treatment Systems", which was implemented in 2018.

In 2017, Lemoyan was elected as a candidate for the Chadema party to serve as one of nine Tanzanian representatives in the regional East African Legislative Assembly (EALA). The 4th EALA was inaugurated on 18 December with representatives from Burundi, Kenya, Rwanda, South Sudan, Tanzania, and Uganda. Lemoyan served on the EALA commission for the 4th assembly, along with other women including Oda Gasinzigwa (Rwanda), Mo-Mamo Karerwa (Burundi), and Wanjiku Muhia (Kenya). The commission is the administrative body of the EALA, managing its business and agenda, as well as appointing members to its standing committees. In 2018, she served on the central corridor delegation of the committee tasked with assessing the projects and facilities that support the East African Community's common market and custom's union integration. She served on the Natural Resources and Tourism Committee in 2019, which implemented a plan to plant cashew trees at the University of Dodoma in central Tanzania in a re-greening effort to combat drought in the region.

The Natural Resources and Tourism Committee pushed through a bill in 2020, based on a report read on the floor by Lemoyan, to establish the Lake Victoria Basin Commission, which was charged with coordinating sustainable development for the natural resources in the basin and integration the laws, policies, regulations, and standards implemented by the nations adjoining the lake. She also backed the 2020 Livestock Bill, which aimed to control livestock movement and animal diseases through member nations to ensure food safety. She agreed with the Eastern Africa Farmers Federation that for the African Continental Free Trade Area (AfCFTA) to be viable, that the bills removing trade restrictions and barriers in the region would need to pass. When the EALA's Committee on Regional Affairs and Conflict Resolution was split into three regions in 2022, Lemoyan was assigned to the team given the task of assessing the safe and secure movement of people and goods in Tanzania on Lakes Tanganyika and Victoria. The other two teams evaluated the lakes from the adjacent countries of Burundi and Uganda. The teams assessed controls in place to curb illegal fishing and reduce pollution on the lakes, as well as the adequacy of surveillance measures and the legal, regulatory, and policy systems governing the use of the lakes.

== Selected works ==
- Lemoyan, J. S. (1988). Child-Labour in Urban Tanzania: The Case of Dar es Salaam (Master's degree). Dar es Salaam, Tanzania: University of Dar es Salaam.
- Mmuya, Max; Lemoyan, Josephine (2008). Strategic Responses Towards Good Governance with Specific Attention to the Local Authority Level (Report). Dar es Salaam, Tanzania: SNV Netherlands Development Organisation.
- Mmuya, Max; Lemoyan, Josephine (2010). The WaSH PCA 2010: Strategic Responses Towards Good Governance and Corruption in the Water, Sanitation and Hygiene Sector (WaSH), Magu and Misungwi (Report). London, UK: WaterAid.
- Lemoyan, Josephine (February 2018). Kilombero and Lower Rufiji Wetlands Ecosystem Management Project (PDF) (Report). Dar es Salaam, Tanzania: Kilorwemp Project Implementation Unit. Archived (PDF) from the original on 31 January 2024.
