= Esther Kazinda =

Ugandan journalist

- Born: 1957 (age 68–69); Mawookota, Mpigi District, Uganda
- Other names: Eseza Omwana Omuto
- Education: Kitebi Primary School, St. Joseph's Nsambya Girls Senior Secondary School
- Occupations: Journalist, Radio and Television Host
- Years active: 1977–present
- Employer(s): Radio Uganda, WBS Television, Star FM
- Known for: Emiti Emito (WBS Television), Radio Uganda Sunday afternoon show
- Spouse: Willian Lusse Kigozi (m. 2016)
- Awards: Recognition from Rotary Club of Kampala Ssese Island (2003–2004), One of the 50 most influential women in Uganda (2018)

Esther Kazinda (born in 1957) also known as Eseza Omwana Omuto is a Ugandan journalist commonly known for radio and television host on Radio Uganda on Sunday afternoons for more than two decades and also for her show on WBS Television called Emiti Emito which focuses on children's education and responsible parenthood. She also presented a similar program for children on Star FM on every Saturday.

== Personal and education background ==
She was born in 1957 in Mawookota, Mpigi district to Elinest Kazinda who died and Aida Kazinda. She attended her primary school at Kitebi Primary School and later joined St. Joseph's Nsambya Girls Senior Secondary School for her secondary education. She married at the age of 61/65 to Willian Lusse Kigozi which took place at her father's home in Mpigi district in 2016.

== Career history ==
She started her career at Radio Uganda in 1977 where she worked as children's specialists for 26 years.

== Recognition ==
Between 2003 and 2004, she was awarded by the Rotary Club of Kampala Ssese Island in recognition of her services in the community in the radio and television broadcasting. She was also recognized as one of the 50 most influential women in Uganda in 2018.

== See also ==
- Karitas Karisimbi
- Namaganda Susan
- Ssendi Mosh Afrikan
