= Norbert Mao =

Minister of Justice, Ugandan lawyer and politician (born 1967)

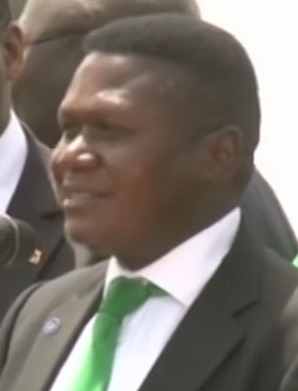
- Mao in 2017
- Born: 12 March 1967 (age 59); Uganda
- Citizenship: Uganda
- Education: Makerere University (Bachelor of Laws); Law Development Centre (Diploma in Legal Practice); Yale University (International Fellowship)
- Occupations: Lawyer and politician
- Years active: 1996–present
- Known for: Politics
- Spouse(s): Naomi Achieng (2003-2019); Beatrice Kayanja (2024-present)

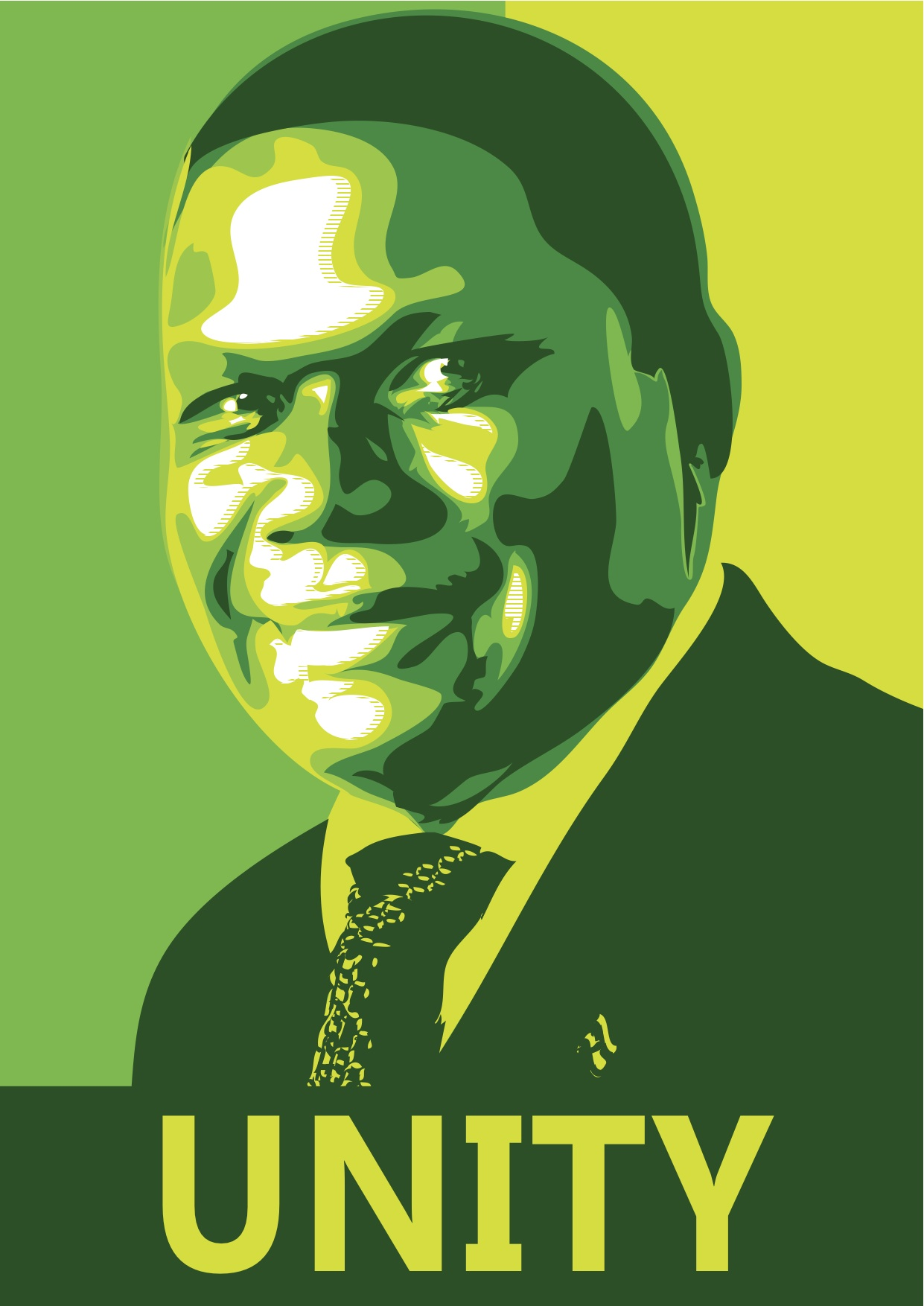
Campaign poster for DP presidential candidate Norbert Mao. Designed by Samson Mwaka for the February 2011 issue of the Kampala Dispatch Magazine.

Norbert Mao is a Ugandan politician and lawyer. He has been the president of the Democratic Party since 2010, three time presidential candidate and served as the Local Council 5 chairman for Gulu District. He is the current minister for Justice and Constitutional Affairs in the Ugandan government, an office he assumed on 21 July 2022. He was appointed to this position by Yoweri Museveni, the president of the Republic of Uganda. The appointment drew criticism from the members of the opposition, who characterized the agreement as a political maneuver to weaken the opposition party cohesion.

== Early life and education ==
Mao was born on 12 March 1967. His father, Dusman Okee Sr. (5 January 1942 – 3 January 2016), was Acholi and his mother was a Munyankole. Mao attended Mwiri Primary School in Jinja and briefly went to Wairaka College in Jinja District before attending Namilyango College, a prestigious all-boys boarding high school in Mukono District from 1982 until 1988. He then attended Makerere University from 1988 until 1991, graduating with a degree in law (LLB). He served as the president of the Makerere University Students Guild between 1990 and 1991 which gave him the first experience in politics. He went on to obtain a postgraduate Diploma in Legal Practice from the Law Development Center in 1992. In 2003, Mao was admitted to Yale University, under the Yale World Fellows Program, where he spent one year at the New Haven, Connecticut campus. Parliamentary records also describe him having an Associate Bachelor of Arts and master's degree in development studies from Uganda Martyrs University.

== Before politics ==
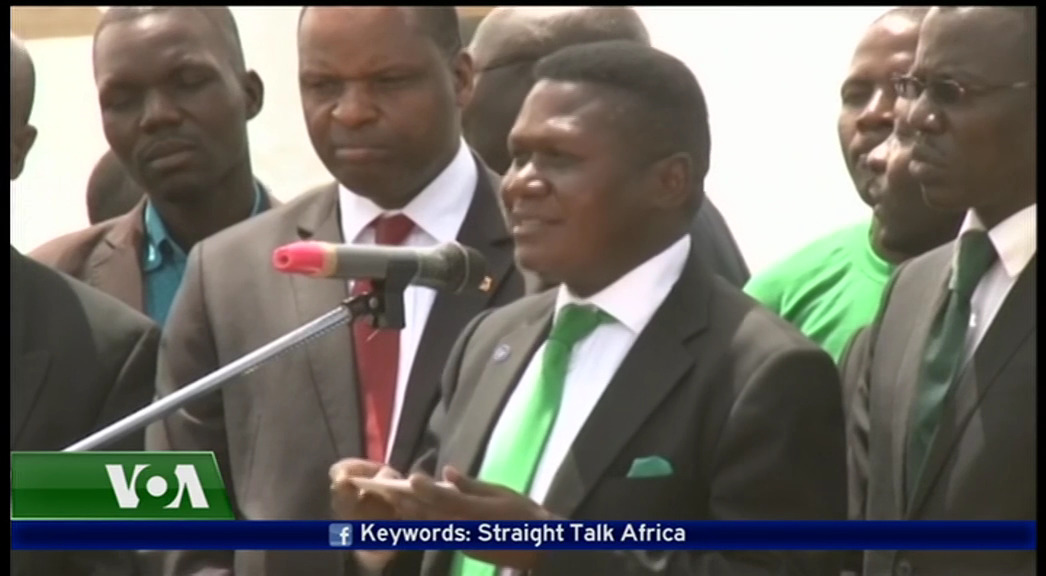
Norbert Mao

From 1992 until 1994, Mao worked as an associate attorney in the offices of Kabugo and Company Advocates, a Kampala-based law firm. Between 1994 and 1996, he worked as a legal counsel for the Legal Aid Project of the Uganda Law Society in their Gulu office.

== Politics ==
In 1996, he was elected to the Parliament of Uganda, representing Gulu Municipality. While in parliament, he served on the Legal and Parliamentary Affairs Committee and the Public Accounts Committee. He resigned from Parliament in 2006 and was elected chairman of Gulu District.

Mao is chairman of the East African chapter of the Parliamentary Network on the World Bank and member of its secretariat. Also, he helped found the Great Lakes Parliamentary Forum on Peace (AMANI Forum). He was instrumental in trying to bridge the gap between the Lord's Resistance Army rebels and the Ugandan government by lobbying for the passage of a general amnesty law aimed at bringing a peaceful resolution to armed conflict in northern Uganda.

== Presidential aspiration ==
He belongs to the Democratic Party and publicly indicated his intention to contest the 2011 Ugandan presidential elections, either as the nominee of his party or if not nominated on the party ticket, as an independent. He was elected as President of the Democratic Party on 20 February 2010 and ran for President of Uganda in the 2011 general election. The DP faced a lot of challenges that led to a split and deep polarization at the height of the election. He attracted only a small share of the vote, and President Yoweri Museveni was elected to another term. Mao and Inter Party Coalition presidential candidates Kizza Besigye and Olara Otunnu, among others, protested the election results in spite of its early approval by international observers and the United States as largely free and fair.

On 21 November 2020, Mao, along with fellow opposition presidential candidates such as Kyagulanyi Robert Ssentamu, Henry Tumukunde, Mugisha Muntu, and Patrick Amuriat Oboi, agreed to form an alliance.

On 20 July 2022, Mao was appointed Minister of Justice and Constitutional Affairs by president Museveni in a move that sparked off a debate about his allegiance to the opposition. On 28 July 2022, Mao was sworn in at State House Entebbe with President Museveni as the main witness.

Nobert Mao has been a regular attendee and speaker at the annual Ugandan North American Association (UNAA) convention in the USA.

== Personal life ==
Mao was married to Naomi Achieng Odongo, and they have two sons together. They divorced on 27 May 2019, after 16 years of marriage. On 1 June 2024 Mao married Beatrice Nambi in Gulu City. He speaks Luo, Luganda, Runyankole, and English fluently. Mao is a step-brother to Daniel Kidega, the former speaker of the East African Legislative Assembly.

== See also ==
- Mugisha Muntu
- Bobi Wine
- Kizza Besigye

Preceded by John Ssebaana Kizito	President of the Democratic Party; 2010 – Present	Succeeded by Incumbent
