= Mukasa Mbidde =

Ugandan lawyer and politician

Honourable Dr

Personal details
- Born: Fred Mukasa Mbidde; 15 October 1974 (age 51) Masaka, Uganda
- Citizenship: Uganda
- Education: Makerere University; Law Development Centre
- Occupation: Lawyer; Human-rights activist; politician
- Known for: Law, Human-rights Activism & Politics

Fred Mukasa Mbidde (born 15 October 1974) is a Ugandan lawyer, human-rights activist, mass communication specialist, motivational speaker and politician. He is an elected member of the 3rd East African Legislative Assembly (EALA), representing the Republic of Uganda. He has been in this office since June 2012.

He serves on three EALA committees: the Committee on Communication, Trade and Investments; the Committee on Legal, Rules and Privileges; and the Committee on Regional Affairs and Conflict Resolution. He is the chairperson of the Committee on Communication, Trade and Investments.

He is a member, a former chief legal advisor, the chairman Masaka district and the current National Vice President of the Democratic Party, (DP). He is also a member of the Pan African Lawyers Union and the Coalition for an Effective African Court on Human and Peoples' Rights (African Court Coalition).

He first gained prominence in 2001 when serving as the Guild President for Makerere University. He played a significant role in the "Save Mabira Riots" that took place in Uganda in the year 2007. Also, Mbidde played a noteworthy role in the 1994 liberation war of Rwanda. He is the Patron of the Mbidde Foundation and the reigning attorney general for Kooki chiefdom.

== Early life and education ==
Mukasa Mbidde was born in Masaka District on 15 October 1973 as the second born of the late Emmanuel Mbidde, a former headmaster and Ms. Mary Kintu, now a retired teacher. A Muganda by tribe, he was born in a Christian family of the Ente clan. Two of his siblings are Henry Mbidde and Balaam Mbidde both of whom are lecturers at Makerere University. He had some military training in the 1990s and played a noteworthy role in the 1994 liberation war of Rwanda when he fought alongside the National resistance mkovement (nra) before joining University in 1999.

He has been his own boss over the years and has run businesses that include among others, The Financial Times newspaper (1999–2000), a Forex bureau (1999 to-date), a Radio Station in Rwanda, a law firm Mbidde & Co Advocates (2011 to-date), the Mbidde Foundation headquartered in Nagoya, Japan, etc. He is friends with many Japanese and these have supported his programs for many years through the Mbidde Foundation.

Mukasa Mbidde attended Nakyenyi Primary School, a school where his mother taught, for his primary education and Kabwoko High School for his middle school education. He attended Masuliita Boarding School and Kampala High School for his high school education. He attended Makerere University and Law Development Centre (LDC) for his higher education. He holds a Mass Communication degree (2003) from Makerere University, an LLB (2009) from Makerere University and a postgraduate Diploma in Legal Practice (Dip.Leg.Pract) (2010) from Law Development Centre. He also had leadership training at the Norwegian School of Leadership and Theology (HLT) in 2005. In 2014, Mbidde had a legal engagement in Practice in Sub-regional Courts at the Mandela Institute, University of the Witwatersrand.

== Junior political career ==
Mukasa Mbidde began his involvement in politics in 1999 as a member of the Uganda Young Democrats (UYD), the junior wing of the Democratic Party. He served as the deputy treasurer for the party and then as the secretary for Students' Affairs. He stood for the Makerere University guild presidency in 2001 on the UYD ticket and won in all polling stations for a number of reasons. His predecessor was Asuman Basalirwa and his successor was Denis Okema. During this time he was given the title of Otak Olweny (meaning fighter) and the name Okello by the Acholi Makerere University Students Association (AMUSA) and the Acholi Sub-region elders. He also, received Japanese Recognition Awards from Chiba University and Soka University in 2002. Finally, he won the 2001 American Council of Young Political Leaders (ACYPL) award, an accolade given to young political leaders annually by the American Council.

== Senior political career ==
After his guild presidency, he went on to become the National UYD Vice President in 2005. In 2006, he became the National Deputy Campaigning Director for the senior wing of the Democratic Party. He was deputizing Norbert Mao at the time. He was a candidate in the 2007 parliamentary by-elections for Kalungu East county, Masaka district but lost in controversial circumstances and to-date still blames President Yoweri Museveni's involvement for the loss. He also stood in the 2011 parliamentary elections for the same constituency and lost but this time contentedly.

Having failed to go to parliament in 2011, Mbidde saw a loophole in Uganda's East African Legislative Assembly (EALA) representation which then favored the ruling party, the National Resistance Movement, and so sought court redress and lobbied for the inclusion of more opposition party members. On succeeding in court, he was voted in on the DP ticket though in controversial circumstances and has been an EALA MP since June 2012. He serves on three EALA committees, the Committee on Communication, Trade and Investments, the Committee on Legal, Rules and Privileges and the Committee on Regional Affairs and Conflict Resolution. He is the chairperson of the Committee on Communication, Trade and Investments. He also heads the sub committee on legal, rules and privileges. Also, he is the head of the Speaker's legal board and the head of East African Sub-regional human rights practitioners.

Bills tabled, supported or unsupported

- In January 2013, Mbidde said he was to petition the EALA assembly to declare Museveni's actions in Uganda where he clashed with his parliament, incompatible with his status as the bloc's chair. President Museveni had been on the offensive at the time against parliament since the botched investigations into the death of Butaleja Woman MP Cerinah Nebanda who died under questionable circumstances on 20 December 2012.
- In April 2013, Mbidde passed a motion in support of the proposal that SADC and the UN Security Council resolutions for an "offensive international peacekeeping force" against the M23 rebels be kept in abeyance to give dialogue a chance.
- In June 2013, Mbidde stopped by petition the admission of South Sudan into the East African Community (EAC). He had earlier on been quoted saying "I am going to table the bill to block South Sudan from joining EAC if that country fails to adhere to my plea. The murder of innocent Ugandans cannot go on unchallenged."
- In March 2014, Mbidde successfully filed a petition before the East African Court of Justice seeking orders to stop anybody from drafting a motion to censure Margaret Zziwa, the EALA Speaker.
- In March 2015, the Committee on Communication, Trade and Investments which is chaired by Mbidde passed a bill on elimination of non-tariff barriers, the EAC Elimination of Non-Tariff Barriers Bill, 2015.

== Legal career ==
Mukasa Mbidde has been a practicing lawyer from 2011 to-date. He is a member of the Uganda Law Society, the East African Law Society, the Pan African Lawyers Union and the Coalition for an Effective African Court on Human and Peoples' Rights (African Court Coalition). He is a visiting lecturer at Soka University, Chiba University and Kyoritsu Women's University in Japan. He is a consultant for Kenya Human-rights Commission in Freedom of Movement. His specialty areas are the Law of Treaties, Corporate Financing, Mergers and Acquisitions as well as Conveyancing and Trademarks.

He runs a private law firm in the names of Mbidde & Co Advocates and the Mbidde Foundation of which he is the patron is also a legal based NGO. He usually has joint instructions on high-profile cases with Justin Semuyaba of Semuyaba Yiga & Co Advocates. He has been the brain behind many of the cases filed by Uganda's Democratic Party, he being the Chief Legal Advisor of the political party. His practice of late has been inclined to Sub-regional courts especially the East African Court of Justice (EACJ), the highlight of this being his 2011 EALA case in the aforesaid court.

== Philanthropy ==
Mukasa Mbidde is a philanthropist in Uganda. He sponsored elections of ten or so members of parliament in Uganda. He is a co-sponsor of the activities of Uganda's Democratic Party as well as the Catholic Church in Uganda. His passion for boxing has made him generous in his sponsoring of a number of boxing clubs in the country. Being a lawyer, he has often offered pro bono litigation to indigent clients and has often assisted diaspora members in land matters. Recently, Mbidde was recognized by KCCA for co-sponsoring the construction of a newly erected Kabaka monument at the historical Kabaka Njagala road junction in Mengo.

== Controversies ==
Mukasa Mbidde has been involved in a number of controversies from his fighting alongside Kagame's Rwandan Patriotic Army (RPA) in the 1990s to his support of Margaret ZZiwa, the former EALA Speaker. His loss in the 2007 Kalungu East parliamentary elections came with allegations of vote rigging masterminded by President Yoweri Museveni as punishment for Mbidde's role in the 2007 Save Mabira Riots in Kampala in which two Ugandan men and an Indian man were killed and 40 Indians evacuated from a Hindu temple.

Mukasa Mbidde also caused controversy when he supported Norbert Mao a non Muganda for the DP presidency and further is believed to have been instrumental to his coming into office of president for a political party that was founded on Buganda and Roman Catholic roots. His election to EALA was also punctuated by opposition strategic disagreements which led to the exclusion of FDC, the largest opposition party in Uganda's parliament. It is alleged that given his then filed new Application No4 of 2012 before the East African Court of Justice made the NRM, to have no alternative but to vote for Mbidde for the resultant effect of saving the elections from court nullification and this in the end worked to foil the FDC-led plot to boycott the elections.

== Personal details ==
Mukasa Mbidde was married to the late Susan Namaganda, the former Woman MP for Bukomansimbi District, with whom he had three children. He is also a father to Gabrielle Mbidde. He is close friends with about six EALA MPs that include among others Dr. James Ndahiro and Dr. Abdu Karim Harelimana from Republic of Rwanda, Hafsa Mossi of Burundi, Peter Mutuku Mathuki of Kenya, Nyerere Charles Makongoro of Tanzania and Suzan Nakawuki of Uganda.

== See also ==
- East African Legislative Assembly
- Bukomansimbi District
- Masaka District
