= Namaganda Susan =

Ugandan politician

Namaganda Susan Hon.
- Born: 1984
- Died: 2015; Mpanga, Mpigi District
- Education: Makerere University
- Occupation: Politician
- Years active: 2011–2015
- Employer: Parliament of Uganda
- Successor: Veronica Nanyondo
- Political party: Democratic Party (Uganda)
- Spouse: Mukasa Mbidde

Namaganda Susan (1984 - 2015) was a Ugandan politician elected in the ninth Parliament of Uganda representing Bukomansimbi District. She became Bukomansimbi's first woman Member of Parliament in 2011 following the district's creation in July 2010.

== Education ==
She attended St. Mary of Lourdes primary school, and Mengo Senior School. Susan obtained her UCE at Christ the King Bulinda in 2002 before joining St. Andrew Kagwa and Daniel for her A level. She is an ICT graduate with a degree in Cisco Certified Network Associate obtained in bachelor's degree in information technology in 2006. In 2008, she obtained a diploma in Cisco Certified Network professional from Makerere University.

== Personal life ==
Namaganda was born on April 10, 1984, to the late Simon Peter Kamala and Elizabeth Sserunkuma Bbosa. In 2015, Susan died at Nakasero Hospital following a car accident at Mpanga, Mpigi District along Masaka Road while she was traveling to Kampala to attend a parliamentary session. The accident happened on 11 December 2015 between 1:00-2:00am at Mpanga Forest near Mpigi town council according to Democratic Party organising secretary, Innocent Katerega. Susan was survived by three children including a seven-month-old baby girl. Namaganda was wife to the East African Legislative assembly Member of Parliament, Mukasa Mbidde who married her in December 2012 in a traditional wedding locally known as (Kwanjula) held at her parents' home in Kisojjo Village, Kibange Sub County, Bukomansimbi District. However, Mukasa Mbidde, was later introduced by his girlfriend, Fiona in a Kinyarwanda cultural ceremony.

== Political life ==
In the ninth Parliament, Susan served as the woman Member of Parliament under the Democratic Party(DP). Susan joined politics in 2010 after briefing serving as an administrator at Egy Trading and Engineering Ring in Bugolobi. When she was in Parliament in 2011, Susan served as the deputy DP National Women Chairperson from July 2015, Member of the Parliamentary Scripture Union and Organizing Secretary DP Bukomansimbi.

She served as a Member on the Committees of Science and Technology and of Agriculture, Animal Industry and Fisheries. She became a household name when she staged a spirited fight for prices of agricultural commodities and was nicknamed beyi y'abilime. Four days later after Susan's death, Veronica Nanyondo was anointed as her political successor within the family at Namaganda's burial. Nanyondo contestde in her sister's position on the opposition Democratic Party (DP) and on February 18, 2016, she was voted into office winning five other contestants.

During the public viewing of the body of the late Susan Namaganda which was delayed at the Parliament, Rwampara MP, Vincent Kyamadidi said the country had lost a vibrant politician who still had a lot to offer to her constituents.

== See also ==
- List of members of the ninth Parliament of Uganda
- List of members of the eleventh Parliament of Uganda
- Mukasa Mbidde
