= Mo-Mamo Karerwa =

Burundian teacher and politician

- Other names: Karerwa Mo-Mamo, Karerwa Mo-Mamo Modeste, Modeste Karerwa, Modeste Karerwa Mo-Mamo, Modeste Mo-Mamo Karerwa
- Occupations: Teacher, politician

Mo-Mamo Karerwa is a Burundian educator, school administrator, and politician. Trained as a teacher, when ethnic violence broke out in 1993, she founded the Magarama II Peace Primary School. The curricula of the school, which taught students from the age two through sixth grade, followed the government mandated courses for half of the day and taught conflict resolution and how to live in peace for the remainder of the school day. She developed a curriculum which taught children's rights and examined Burundian history and culture as a path to a peaceful future. The curriculum was adopted by sixteen schools in the Gitega Province and she was appointed as the primary school teacher representative to the Provincial Education Council in 2003.

In 2010, Karerwa was elected to the National Assembly as a representative of the National Council for the Defense of Democracy – Forces for the Defense of Democracy (NCDD-FDD) party. When the members were installed, she was unanimously elected as first vice president of the lower parliamentary house. She was re-elected in 2015, but resigned when she was elected in 2017 to serve as one of Burundi's representatives in the 4th term of the East African Legislative Assembly (EALA). EALA is a regional parliamentary body with representatives from Burundi, Kenya, Rwanda, South Sudan, Tanzania, and Uganda. She was elected to serve on the EALA commission, the administrative body for EALA for the 4th session and re-elected to both the EALA and the commission in 2022 for the 5th assembly.

== Early life and education career ==
Modeste Mo-Mamo Karerwa was a Hutu teacher living in Gitega, when the Burundian genocide broke out in 1993. As students in the past had been taught that the Tutsi people were a superior race than the Hutu people, she realized that the conflicts could not be resolved without bringing the two sides together. She founded the Magarama II Peace Primary School, that year to change what children were being taught. She traveled to Sweden in 1995 to seek help from Swedish Quakers. Backed by Quaker missionaries, the school aimed to teach children how to live together peacefully. Teaching 700 elementary students from 2-year-old preschool pupils to sixth grade, her students were taught the compulsory government curricula in the mornings and in the afternoon were given instruction on how Hutu, Tutsi, and Twa people should form peaceful relationships. From the first grade, her students began learning about children's rights and held regular reviews with parents weekly. Because many of the people had been forced to leave their homes and were living in internally displaced person camps or orphanages, Karerwa visited them to extend her peace education project. She took groups of children with her to the camps, orphanages, and hospitals to teach them about sharing goods with others and had them perform songs and dramas for the internees.

Karerwa travelled with David Niyonzima, the General Secretary of Burundi Evangelical Friends Church to Durban, South Africa, in 1998, where they were featured speakers at the 17th International Peace Research Association General Conference. Niyonzima spoke about the campaign to translate conflict resolution documents into the national language, Kirundi. Karerwa discussed teaching children and their parents about the culture and history of Burundi within a framework that embraced a peaceful future. Conference attendees discussed how the model that Niyonzima and Karerwa had developed could be transplanted to other places of conflict. In 2003, Karerwa was appointed to serve on the Provincial Education Council by the governor of Gitega Province, as the representative for primary school teachers. The government embraced the Quaker curriculum used by Karerwa and by 2008, she had 16 primary schools under her direction.

== Politics ==
In 2010, Karerwa was elected as one of the members of the National Assembly and subsequently unanimously elected as first vice president of the lower parliamentary house, succeeding Irene Inankuyo. She was a member of the National Council for the Defense of Democracy – Forces for the Defense of Democracy (NCDD-FDD) party. In 2012, she was the featured speaker at the International Women's Day festivities in Gitega. She spoke about the particularly difficult role of rural women in the fight against poverty and hunger. She stated that the 2008 census confirmed that more women in the country were employed in agriculture than men, but that women were poorer because they received less training, and had no ability to control either the land or their production. She spoke of the need for the government to focus on revising the family codes and agricultural use of land. In 2014, she led Burundian delegation at the African Caribbean Pacific-European Union Joint Parliamentary Assembly held in Port Louis, Mauritius. Among the issues discussed were regional economic integration, enhanced cooperation on transportation and digital connections, coordination of systems to stem terrorism and conflict, improvements in services and protection for women and children, and strengthening democracy and accountability with a focus on human rights. She served on the ACP-EU Assembly's Commission of Economic Development, Financial and, Commercial Affairs co-chaired by Nela Khan (Trinidad and Tobago) and Derek Vaughan (Wales).

Karerwa was re-elected for a second term in 2015. Among her appointments were to the commission which monitored regulations of the assembly, and vice president of the Committee on Social Affairs, Repatriation, Equal Opportunities and the Fight against AIDS. When she was elected as one of the nine legislators representing Burundi for a five-year term in the regional East African Legislative Assembly (EALA) in 2017, she resigned her seat in the Burundian National Assembly. The 4th EALA was inaugurated on 18 December with representatives from Burundi, Kenya, Rwanda, South Sudan, Tanzania, and Uganda. Karerwa served on the EALA commission for the 4th assembly, along with other women including Oda Gasinzigwa (Rwanda), Josephine Lemoyan (Tanzania), and Wanjiku Muhia (Kenya). The commission serves as the administrative body of the EALA, managing its business and agenda, as well as appointing members to its standing committees. That term, she was part of a team of members of the EALA Parliament who visited Burundi and Rwanda in 2018 in an attempt to begin repairing the Burundi–Rwanda relations, which had been deteriorating for several years. She was re-elected to a second term in EALA in 2022, and was re-elected to the EALA commission. She also served on the Committee on Regional Affairs and Conflict Resolution.
