= James Rwanyarare =

Ugandan politician

- Citizenship: Uganda
- Occupations: doctor, politician
- Known for: Political activism in Uganda
- Notable work: "Oh Uganda:The life and times of Dr.James Rwanyarare"
- Title: Dr.
- Political party: Uganda People's Congress

James William Rwanyarare is a Ugandan doctor and politician who was the founder member of the Uganda People's Congress . He published a book titled "Oh Uganda:The life and times of Dr.James Rwanyarare," which talks about the history of Uganda.

== Career ==
Rwanyarare was the founding member of the Uganda People's Congress(UPC) and also a personal doctor to former president Idi Amin. He was a minister of Culture and chairperson of the Presidential Policy Commission under the reign of Milton Obote. He attended a burial of Garanga in Juba where he was quoted saying that he represented UPC which Peter Walubiri, the Constitutional Steering Committee secretary general dismissed calling him an impostor.

In 2005, Rwanyarare first walked out of the National Council meeting which was to resolve UPC's party disputes together with Cecilia Ogwal. He later dragged his party to High Court challenging the legality of the delegates conference, which elected new leadership.

== Personal life ==
In 2025, Rwanyarare's son, Kevin Kiiza Rwanyarare was charged with 10 counts, which included the fraudulent procurement of a special certificate of title for his father's 635-acre in Kasanje Town Council, Wakiso District at Buganda Road Chief Magistrates Court .

== See also ==
- Cecilia Ogwal
- Olara Otunnu
- Milton Obote
