= Jimmy Lemi Milla =

South Sudanese politician (1948–2011)

His Excellency Jimmy Lemi Milla

Minister for Co-operatives and Rural Development
- In office 2010 – 9 February 2011
- President: Salva Kiir
- Preceded by: Ann Itto Leonardo

Personal details
- Born: August 8, 1948 Central Equatoria
- Died: February 9, 2011 (aged 62) Juba, Southern Sudan
- Party: National Congress Party, then Sudan People's Liberation Movement
- Education: Makerere University

Jimmy Lemi Milla (August 8, 1948 – February 9, 2011) was a Sudanese politician, and cabinet member in Southern Sudan. He was a Pojulu.

== Career ==
Milla studied at Makerere University in Uganda, obtaining a Bachelor of Arts degree in 1973. He subsequently studied in Addis Ababa, Ethiopia, for a Diploma in Aviation, which he obtained in 1976. In 1980, he obtained a Certificate in Mass Communication from the Khartoum School of Mass Communication.

He began his political career in his home state of Central Equatoria, serving at different times as Minister for Education and deputy Governor of the state government, as well as chairman of the State Human Rights Commission. He has also been Assistant Commissioner for Culture and Information in Eastern Equatoria, and Director of Information and Press Secretary to the President of the High Executive Council of Southern Sudan.

In his career in national government in Sudan, he served as chairman of the States Commission in the National Assembly in Khartoum, and Deputy Secretary General of Government.

He was initially a member of the National Congress Party, Sudan's ruling conservative party, but joined the Sudan People's Liberation Movement, the dominant party in Southern Sudan, following the latter's Comprehensive Peace Agreement with the Sudanese government in 2005.

In 2010, he was appointed Minister for Co-operatives and Rural Development in the government of autonomous Southern Sudan, replacing Ann Itto Leonardo, who had been promoted Minister for Agriculture. He also represented the constituency of Lainy in the Legislative Assembly of Southern Sudan. Milla was still holding that position in government when, on 7 February 2011, the result of the Southern Sudanese independence referendum was announced, indicating that Southern Sudan would become an independent State.

== Murder ==
Two days after announcing the Southern Sudanese independence referendum, Milla and his bodyguard were shot dead inside his ministry building, reportedly by Milla's driver. The reason for the murder was said to be "personal rather than political".
