= Florence Nakiwala Kiyingi =

Ugandan politician (born 1972)

- Born: 1972 (age 53–54); Uganda
- Citizenship: Uganda
- Education: Makerere University (Bachelor of Commerce)
- Occupations: Businesswoman & Politician
- Years active: 1998 — present
- Title: Minister of State for Youth and Children Affairs
- Spouse: Deogratius Kiyingi

Florence Nakiwala Kiyingi (née Florence Nakiwala), is a Ugandan businesswoman and politician. She is the current presidential advisor for Youth and Children Affairs in Uganda. She was appointed to this position on 6 June 2021. She is the former Minister of State for Youth and Children Affairs in the Cabinet of Uganda. She was appointed to that position on 6 June 2016 to 6 June 2021 She is also the Federation of Uganda Football Associations third Vice-President, the first woman to hold that position in Uganda. As well she serves as the Chairperson Commonwealth Youth Ministers Task force voted to that position in 2017.

== Early life and education ==
Florence Nakiwala was born in 1972, in Kimanya, Masaka District, to the late Charles Ssonko and Perepetwa Najjuma, as the 8th born among 12 children. Her father was the County Chief of Buddu at that time. She attended Kimanya Primary School before she was admitted to Trinity College Nabbingo for her O-Level and A-Level education. While at Nabbingo, she was appointed the sanitary prefect at the school.

She studied at Makerere University, graduating with a Bachelor of Commerce degree. She has a doctorate degree in leadership from CommonWealth University. While there, she was elected to the executive committee of Nkoba Za Mbogo, the Baganda students’ organisation at Makerere University. She also served as the leader of the commerce students in her course. In her first year at Makerere, she met and eventually fell in love with her husband, Deogratius Kiyingi, the Member of Parliament for Bukomansimbi South Constituency in the 10th Parliament (2016 - 2021).

== Career ==
=== Business ===
As a teenager, still in middle school, Florence Nakiwala took a trip to London and witnessed how a well-run health facility operates. This created a burning desire in her to own a well-run healthcare facility when she grew up. After graduating from Makerere she established Lisa Medical Centre, a chain of clinics and short-stay hospitals in Uganda, with a branch in Nairobi, Kenya.

=== Buganda Government ===
Florence Nakiwala served as the Minister for Youth Affairs in the Kingdom of Buganda, for a period of five years. She then served as the Tourism Minister in the kingdom, a post she held until June 2016.

=== National politics ===
During the 2016 national elections, Florence Nakiwala contested the Kampala Women Representative seat in the 10th parliament (2016 - 2021) under the Democratic Party ticket and she lost to Nabilah Naggayi Sempala of the Forum for Democratic Change political party. Later on in 2021 elections she contested for woman MP of Bukomansimbi on the NRM ticket and she lost to her opponent Nanyondo Veronica from DP (Democratic Party). In a surprise move, President Yoweri Museveni named Nakiwala Minister of State for Youth and Children, on 6 June 2016.

== Personal life ==
Florence Nakiwala Kiyingi is married to Deogratius Kiyingi since 1998. They are of the Roman Catholic faith. Together, they are parents to five children, three boys and two girls. Effective 6 June 2016, she was appointed chairperson of Express FC, a member of Uganda Super League.

== See also ==
- Cabinet of Uganda
- Parliament of Uganda
