= Margaret Zziwa =

Ugandan politician (born 1963)

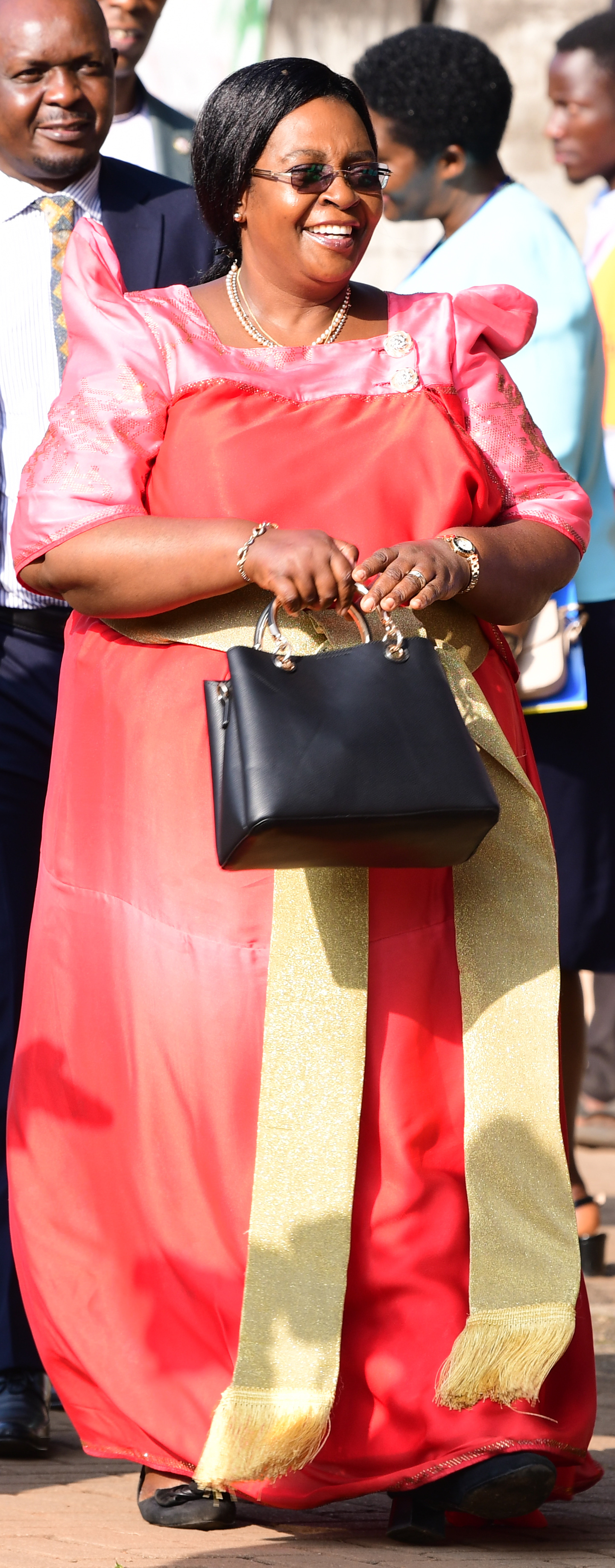
- Margaret Zziwa
- Born: Margaret Nantongo Zziwa; 1963 (age 62–63); Kampala, Uganda
- Citizenship: Uganda
- Education: Makerere University (Bachelor of Arts in economics) (Postgraduate Diploma in education) (Master of Arts in gender and women studies); University of Stirling (Master of Science in social policy studies) (Doctor of Philosophy)
- Occupation: Politician
- Years active: 1993–present
- Title: Member of the East African Legislative Assembly

Margaret Nantongo Zziwa is a Ugandan politician and legislator. She served as the Speaker of the 3rd East African Legislative Assembly (EALA) in Arusha, Tanzania. She was elected to serve in that capacity in June 2012. She was impeached and voted out of office on 17 December 2014, on charges of misconduct and abuse of office, but was later awarded compensation for illegal removal.

== Early life and education ==
Zziwa was born to Charles Mugerwa and Josephine Mugerwa of Mpererwe, a suburb of Uganda's capital and largest city, Kampala, in 1963.

She holds a degree of Bachelor of Arts in Economics and a Postgraduate Diploma in Education, both from Makerere University, Uganda's oldest institution of higher education. Another of her master's degrees, obtained from Makerere as well, is the Master of Arts in Gender and Women Studies. She also holds another master's degree, the Master of Arts in Social Policy Studies, from the University of Stirling in the United Kingdom. Later, she was awarded a Doctor of Philosophy by the University of Stirling.

== Career ==
Before joining politics, Zziwa taught economics and geography at Kololo Senior Secondary School, a high school in the centre of Kampala. She also served as a part-time lecturer in the Faculty of Women and Gender Studies at Makerere University.

Between 1993 and 1995, she served as a member of the Constituent Assembly that drafted the 1995 Ugandan Constitution. From 1996 until 2006, she served two consecutive terms in Uganda's Parliament as the Women's Member of Parliament for Kampala District. During the 2006 elections, she lost her parliamentary seat to Nabilah Naggayi Sempala.

Since 2007, she has served as one of the nine Ugandan legislators in the East African Legislative Assembly (EALA), the legislative arm of the East African Community. In June 2012, she was elected to serve as the speaker of the EALA for a five-year term.

== Other responsibilities ==
Zziwa is a board member of St. Margaret Secondary School, a school she started. She is also a founder-member of St. Francis Choir at St. Jude Catholic Church at Naguru, another Kampala suburb.

== Personal life ==
Zziwa is married to Francis Babu. They have four children together.

She is of the Roman Catholic faith.

She is a member of the National Resistance Movement, the ruling political party in Uganda since 1986.

Preceded by Abdirahin Abdi; 2007–2012	Speaker of the East African Legislative Assembly; 2012–2014	Succeeded by Daniel Kidega; 2014–2017
