= Dora Byamukama =

Ugandan politician

Dora Kanabahita Byamukama is a Ugandan politician, lawyer, advocate and legislator. She is an elected member of the East African Legislative Assembly for the period June 2012 through June 2017. She previously served the Mwenge South constituency as a member of the Parliament of Uganda.

She holds two degrees from Makerere University and is considered an international expert in law, social justice and development.
