= James Mathenge Kanini =

Kenyan politician

James Mathenge Kanini (born 1972) is a Kenyan politician, popularly known as Kanini Kega. He was the former Member of Parliament for Kieni Constituency representing the Jubilee coalition.

== Early life and education ==
Kanini was born on 31 October 1972 in Watuka village, Kieni, Nyeri County. He attended Muthuini Primary School and Chinga Boys High School for his secondary education. In 1998, he graduated from University of Nairobi with a Bachelor of Arts degree.

== Political career ==
Kanini first showed interest in the Kieni parliamentary seat in the 2002 General Election. It was during the campaign period ahead of the 2002 Elections that he got the name Kanini Kega (which means 'young and good' in Gikuyu), a name Kanini said was given to him by the electorate. He lost the parliamentary seat twice in 2002 and 2007, before his ultimate win in 2013.

He served in the Kenyan National Assembly as a member of Parliament for Kieni Constituency from 2013 to 2022. In the 11th Parliament he was a member of the Public Accounts Committee, Departmental Committee on Lands and Departmental Committee on Energy, Communication & Information while in the 12th Parliament he was a member of the Departmental Committee on Trade, Industry and Cooperatives. He was also the Chairman of the Budget and Appropriations Committee.

== 2022 General Elections ==
Kanini was among the members of parliament from central Kenya who strongly supported President Uhuru Kenyatta and has actively been a part of the handshake team popularly known as “Kieleweke”. Kega was in the Azimio la Umoja One Kenya Coalition under Orange Democratic Movement (ODM) leader Raila Odinga, during the August 9 polls. He lost the Kieni Parliamentary seat to Njoroge Wainaina of United Democratic Alliance (UDA) during the 2022 General Elections.

On Thursday, November 17, he was elected to represent Kenya at the East African Legislative Assembly (EALA).
