= Susan Nakawuki =

Ugandan politician

Hon. Susan Nakawuki Nsambu

Member of Parliament in the Parliament of Uganda and East African Legislative Assembly

Member of Parliament
- Former
- In office 2006–2011
- Constituency: Busiro East County

Personal details
- Born: Nakabago village in Mukono District
- Citizenship: Uganda
- Party: National Resistance Movement
- Other political affiliations: Forum for Democratic Change
- Spouse: Alintuma Nsambu
- Parent: Henry Kasirye
- Education: Makerere University
- Occupation: Politician
- Profession: Lawyer and Advocate
- Committees: Parliament of Uganda (The Legal and Parliamentary Affairs Committee, the Committee of Labour, Gender and Social Development and the Foreign Affairs Committee) In the EALA (General Purpose Committee, Accounts Committee, Legal, Rules and Privileges Committee. She also served the Agriculture, Tourism and Natural Resources Committee)

Susan Nakawuki Nsambu (born 1984) is a Ugandan lawyer, politician and legislator who is the state minister for Tourism, Wildlife and Antiquities. She is a member of the twelfth Parliament of Uganda representing Mawokota South constituency under the National Resistance Movement. She served in the eighth Parliament of Uganda as the Woman representative for Busiiro County East in Wakiso District. She was a member of the third and fourth East African Legislative Assemblies.

== Early life and education ==
Nakawuki was born to Henry Kasirye in Nakabago village in Mukono district.

Nakawuki graduated from Makerere University with a Bachelor of Laws in 2008. She studied from Law Development Center.

== Career ==
=== Political career ===
==== Ugandan parliament ====
Nakawuki is currently the member of parliament representing Mawokota South Constituency where she defeated FDC's Yusuf Nsibambi. She contested for this seat against six other contenders in the race in the 2026 general elections.

Nakawuki served as a Ugandan member of parliament for Busiro East East constituency from 2006 to 2011 as a member of the Forum for Democratic Change. She won by 24,660 votes defeating Ddungu Henry Matovu (463 votes), Lubega Samuel .W.M. (2,357 votes), Nabukeera Sophia Kizza (540 votes) and Sebalu Mike Kennedy (17,860 votes).

Nakawuki served on three committees in the parliament of Uganda and these included; the Legal and Parliamentary Affairs Committee, the Committee of Labour, Gender and Social Development and the Foreign Affairs Committee.

Nakawuki contested in the 2021 general election to be a member of Parliament for Mawokota South under the National Resistance Movement and she lost the election to Nsibambi Yusuf who affiliated to Forum for Democratic Change.

==== East African parliament ====
Nakawuki served in the third (2012 - 2017) East African Legislative Assembly (EALA) as she was a member of the Forum for Democratic Change. In 2017, Nakawuki served in the fourth (18 December 2017- 18 December 2022) East African Legislative Assembly and she was not affiliated to any Ugandan political party. While in the EALA, she served as a member of the General Purpose Committee, Accounts Committee, Legal, Rules and Privileges Committee. She also served the Agriculture, Tourism and Natural Resources Committee.

=== Law career ===
Nakawuki is a lawyer by profession. In 2012, she was practicing with Ochieng and company advocates. In 2015, she served as an advocate and legal consultant at Kampala Associated Advocates (KAA).

== Personal life ==
Nakawuki was married to Emmanuel Matthew Matovu with whom she has children. In 2014, she married Alintuma Nsambu after separating from Emmanuel Matovu.

== Controversies ==
=== Nakawuki cheating on her husband ===
On 30 June 2006, Nakawuki was accused of cheating on her husband with her male colleagues during the FDC retreat that happened at the ranch on Lake hotel, kigo. On 1 July 2006, Nakawuki held a press conference together with her husband at resort beach hotel in Entebbe where she informed the people at the press conference that she only went to watch a World Cup match between Germany and Brazil in the room of two male colleagues. Her husband also mentioned that he had always trusted his wife for being faithful and also that he visited the retreat site in the evenings to check on Nakawuki.

=== Emmanuel Matovu was married to another wife before meeting Nakawuki ===
In 2007, After Nakawuki introducing Emmanuel Matthew Matovu to her parents, details about Emmanuel Matovu emerged that he was still married to Maureen Namawejje as the two had gotten married on the 13 December 2003 at Namirembe Diocese and their marriage certificate was signed by Bishop Balagadde Sekadde. Matovu claimed that Maureen left him in 2005 due to her suspecting that he was adulterous. Emmanuel and Maureen gave birth to a son and that she had denied granting Emmanuel's divorce request because he had not yet given her a written commitment from Matovu that he would take care of her son.

== See also ==
- List of members of the eighth Parliament of Uganda
- Nakato Kyabangi Katusiime
- Sylvia Bahireira Tumwekwase
