= Sophie Nsavyimana =

Burundian politician

Sophie Nsavyimana is a Burundian politician and a representative in the East African Legislative Assembly.

== See also ==
- Politics of Burundi
