= Oda Gasinzigwa =

Rwandan banker and politician (born 1966)

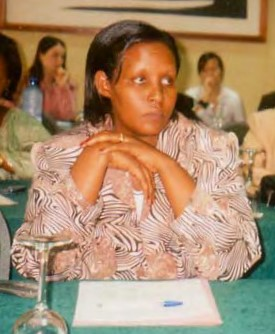
- Gasinzigwa at Women's Legal Rights Initiative conference, 2006
- Born: 1966 (age 59–60); Tanzania
- Occupations: Banker, civil servant, politician
- Years active: 1986–present

Oda Gasinzigwa (born 1966) is a Rwandan civil servant and politician. Born in Tanzania as a refugee, she was educated at the Institute of Development Management in Mzumbe and then worked for eight years at the National Bank of Commerce in Dar es Salaam. When the Rwandan genocide ended in 1994, she moved to Kigali and worked with various ministries to improve women's economic and leadership.

In 2016, she was elected to serve on the East African Legislative Assembly (EALA). She served two terms on its administrative commission and worked on legislation to give the organisation administrative and financial autonomy, improve security and peaceful relations in the region, and synchronise trade agreements. Having completed her term in the EALA in 2022, she became chair of Rwanda's National Electoral Commission in 2023. To harmonise the election processes in Rwanda with those of the other member nations in the East African Community, she proposed that presidential and parliamentary elections in the country be held at the same time. Her proposal was approved by the Cabinet and Parliament of Rwanda and the constitution was modified so that the 2024 election would be held for both the executive branch and legislative branch simultaneously.

== Early life, education, and family ==
Oda Gasinzigwa was born in 1966 as the second of eight siblings in a family of Rwandan refugees living in Tanzania. Her mother was a nurse and her father was a teacher, who had fled their native Rwanda in 1959 because of ethnic conflict. Despite their refugee status, both her parents encouraged the children to pursue higher education. Gasinzigwa completed a bachelor's degree in government administration at the Institute of Development Management, in Mzumbe, Tanzania in 1991. After earning her degree, she began working in administration at the National Bank of Commerce in Dar es Salaam. She remained at the bank for eight years, holding various positions. She married Paul Gasinzigwa in 1992 and had four sons, including William Muhire, the musician known as K8 Kavuyo.

== Career ==
=== Women's advocacy and development (1994–2016) ===
Gasinzigwa and her family returned to Rwanda in 1994, after the Rwandan Patriotic Front, led by Paul Kagame, won the civil war and established a new government. Upon her return to Kigali, Gasinzigwa was hired by the Ministry of Women and Family Promotion. (Note: Swanee Hunt and Jimmy Carter state that the first name given in 1994 for the women's department was Ministry of Women and Family Promotion. Gasinzigwa called it the Ministry of Family and Social Affairs. Rirhandu Mageza-Barthel stated that it was called the Gender Ministry when it was created in 1994 and is now known as the Ministry of Gender and Family Promotion (MIGEPROF).) Her role was to link women who had developed viable economic projects with banks that could finance their projects. After seven years, she transferred in 2001 to the Ministry of Environment to work with the United Nations Development Programme on a resettlement effort for people displaced by the war and genocide. When the resettlement project ended, Gasinzigwa worked briefly on a project with the Ministry of Agriculture to increase farming yields and then worked between 2005 and 2008 for the National Unity and Reconciliation Commission. The commission was tasked with evaluating and proposing reforms to state structures which had in the past led to divisions and conflicts as a basis for charting a peaceful path for the future.

Gasinzigwa was elected to serve as the secretary at the cell-level of the National Women's Council in 2001. The council was an umbrella network which had provincial, district, sectional, cell, and local councils through which women's concerns and needs could be filtered. The goal of these councils was to organise and prepare women throughout the country to become advocates for themselves, so that they would be ready to press for their rights when the first post-genocide elections occurred. She was elected as chair of the national branch of the National Women's Council in 2004, serving for four years before being succeeded by Diane Gashumba.

Gasinzigwa became the chief monitor in the Gender Monitoring Office in 2008. Her job entailed analysing whether the gender targets of the national development plan were on course to achieve equality goals. During her tenure, the enrollment of girls in school increased nearly three percentage points and women's savings in banks rose from 29 to 47 per cent between 2008 and 2012. She organised the first regional women's business conference of the East African Community, "Unlocking Business Opportunities for Women within an EAC Common Market", to allow women to share their expertise on challenges and successes in operating business ventures. The conference, held in Kigali in 2011, was attended by over 300 business owners, policy makers, and officials, sparking the creation of the EAC Women Entrepreneur Association, and the organisation of a second conference to be held in 2015 in Nairobi, Kenya. That year, she commissioned a study to evaluate whether inheritance was reaching equality after the 1999 law reform. The report showed that although the law required equal distribution of the family's property to sons and daughters, its language allowed testators to continue traditional practices of giving sons land and daughters goods they would need to establish a household. Gasingzigwa began pressing for additional reforms to improve women's ability to inherit land.

Gasingzigwa decided to continue her education in 2011 and studied under Shirley Kaye Randell who was the first director of gender studies at the Centre for Gender, Culture and Development of Kigali Institute of Education, now part of the University of Rwanda. She earned a master's degree in gender and development in 2012 and the following year was promoted to the post of Minister of Gender and Family Promotion. The ministry was designed to address gender issues in government policy and legislation and to serve as an interface between women's organisations and their international donors. During her tenure, Gasingzigwa also pressed legislators to improve laws protecting the rights of children and people with disabilities. Speaking with lawmakers, she stressed the need to adopt policies and laws to provide adequate health care and eliminate marginalisation and stigmatisation of those with disabilities.

Gasingzigwa was one of the speakers at the 2014 Women in the World summit held in New York City where she spoke about women's leadership in reconciliation efforts in Rwanda after the genocide. In March 2015, Gasingzigwa was a featured speaker at the 59th session of the Commission on the Status of Women held in New York City to evaluate progress in women's rights since the Beijing World Conference on Women held in 1995. She outlined the steps Rwanda had taken to meet the Beijing action targets, explaining that the country's approach was to allocate financing for gender equality programmes in the national budgeting plan to avoid having insufficient resources for achieving the goals. Upon her return to Rwanda later that month, she spoke at a workshop for the Rwanda Women Leaders Network with Scholastica Kimaryo, United Nations Development Programme Resident Representative to South Africa, on developing leadership and mentoring skills to give women more opportunities and prevent unemployment.

=== Politics (2016–present) ===
Gasinzigwa was elected to serve as a member of parliament in the East African Legislative Assembly (EALA) in 2016, to complete the unfinished five-year term of Christophe Bazivamo. The EALA is a regional legislative body that works to integrate the socio-politico-economic policies of its member nations, which include Burundi, Kenya, Rwanda, Tanzania, Uganda, and South Sudan. She was re-elected in 2012 and again in 2017. In 2017 she was also elected to serve on the EALA Commission, which administers the business activities of the legislative body and appoints its committee members. One of those functions was to develop a plan for the complete administrative and financial autonomy of the EALA. Drawing from the Commonwealth Parliamentary Association and other countries' strategies for good governance, a draft was prepared. When Susan Nakawuki, Uganda's MP, introduced a resolution in 2018 to establish the independence of the legislative body from the East African Cabinet, Gasinzigwa seconded the measure. After completing her two-and-a-half-year term on the EALA Commission, she was re-elected in 2020 to serve another term.

Among other issues Gasinzigwa supported were laws that bettered integration of the member nations of the East African Community. For example, she stated that businesses could not operate at full potential in the region if national laws overrode EALA legislation, preventing harmonisation of policies. She backed analysis of the region's strategic security broadly, not just in terms of political conflict, but with the inclusion of factors like employment, environmental protection, and food security, which could otherwise create unrest and reduce investment and development. Noting the interconnection of issues, she stated that lack of uniform standards, inspection, and testing on food goods would impact both food and health security, as well as trade, making it imperative for border issues to be addressed in a unified manner. As a part of the peace and security strategy, she urged other legislators to adopt the measures recommended by Fatuma Ndangiza, chair of the EALA Committee on Regional Affairs and Conflict Resolution, to prevent genocide. According to Ndangiza, the key to making strides in that area was to address budgeting and staffing shortages in the East African Community's Peace and Security Department.

When her term in the EALA ended in 2023, Gasinzigwa was sworn in as the chair of the National Electoral Commission. In February, she made a proposal for Rwanda to hold its presidential and parliamentary elections simultaneously, as did all the other nations in the East African Community. Her proposal was accepted by the Cabinet of Rwanda in March and sent on to parliament for approval to modify the constitution. It was passed by the legislature in July, with the result that the parliamentary elections previously scheduled for September 2023 would instead be held simultaneously with the presidential election in July 2024.
