= Flowrence Jematiah Sergon =

Kenyan politician

Member of the East African Legislative Assembly
- Incumbent
- Assumed office 18 December 2017

Personal details
- Party: Jubilee Party
- Education: Kenya Medical Training College
- Profession: Politician

Flowrence Jematiah Sergon is a Kenyan politician who has been a member of the National Assembly since the August 2022. In 2017 she was elected a member of the East African Legislative Assembly (EALA).

== Life ==
Flowrence Jematiah was born in Marigat ward of Baringo South constituency. She was educated at Marigat Secondary School in Baringo County, where she was head girl. She then trained at the Kenya Medical Training College. Moving into politics, she worked at the secretariat of the defunct United Republican Party. In 2017, she was appointed to position of coordinator of the Jubilee Party's campaigns in Baringo, Nakuru and Elgeyo-Marakwet counties.

Nominated by the Jubilee Party for the East African Legislative Assembly, she was elected to be a member of the EALA with 252 votes. She was the youngest of Kenya's nine representatives to the EALA.

She was elected Women Member of the National Assembly in the National Assembly from Baringo County in the 2022 general election for the United Democratic Alliance.
