= AMANI Forum =

The Great Lakes Parliamentary Forum on Peace, better known as the AMANI Forum, is an Africa-focused organization based in Nairobi, Kenya that works to promote peace and democracy, and to mitigate conflict in the African Great Lakes region. AMANI Forum was formed in 1998 by regional parliamentarians to create a structure to enable coordinated work towards sustainable peace. Since then AMANI has grown to a membership of over 650 parliamentarians, with national chapters in Burundi, Democratic Republic of Congo (DRC), Kenya, Rwanda, Tanzania, Uganda and Zambia. In 2007 a chapter was established in the East African Legislative Assembly.

Amani is the Swahili word for peace.

Google Books

== Structure and Functioning ==
AMANI Forum has a General Assembly, a Regional Executive Committee (REC), a Regional Secretariat based in Nairobi, and eight National Chapters. The General Assembly sets overall policy and direction at their annual general meeting. The REC meets throughout the year to provide more specific supervision of AMANI activities, while the Regional Secretariat is responsible for planning, implementation, and evaluation of programmes.

AMANI Forum currently has eight National Chapters:

- AMANI Burundi
- AMANI DRC (Democratic Republic of the Congo)
- AMANI Kenya
- AMANI Rwanda
- AMANI Tanzania
- AMANI Uganda
- AMANI Zambia
- AMANI EALA (East African Legislative Assembly)

== See also ==
- Human rights in Africa
