= Kennedy Musyoka Kalonzo =

Kenyan politician

Honorable Kennedy Musyoka Kalonzo
- Born: 1987 (age 38–39); Kenya
- Citizenship: Kenya
- Education: Brookhouse School (High School Diploma); University of Newcastle (Australia) (Bachelor of Arts in International Affairs); University of Nairobi (Bachelor of Laws); Kenya School of Law (Advocate Training Programme)
- Occupations: Lawyer, politician
- Years active: 2011 — present
- Known for: Law
- Title: Member of the East African Legislative Assembly, Representing Kenya (2017—2022)

Kennedy Musyoka Kalonzo is a Kenyan lawyer and politician, who was a member of the fourth East African Legislative Assembly (2017—2022), representing Kenya.

He was nominated to the regional legislative body (EALA), by the Wiper Democratic Movement political party, in June 2017. He was elected to the EALA by both chambers of the Kenyan Parliament in December 2017.

== Background and education ==
He was born in Kenya in 1987. He is the first-born to former Vice President of Kenya Stephen Kalonzo Musyoka and his wife Pauline Musyoka.

Kennedy attended Brookhouse School, in Lang'ata, Nairobi County, where he obtained his High School Diploma. His first degree, a Bachelor of Arts in International Affairs, Politics and Public Policy, was awarded by the University of Newcastle (Australia), in 2010.

His second degree, a Bachelor of Laws, was awarded by the University of Nairobi in 2014. He has also undergone the Advocate Training Programme at the Kenya School of Law.

== Work experience ==
After he completed his first degree in Australia, he returned to Kenya and was hired by Equity Bank Kenya Limited, as a bank teller, at its branch on Moi Avenue in Nairobi, Kenya's capital and largest city. While there, he also worked in the bank's legal department, while he concurrently pursued a law degree from the University of Nairobi.

At the time of his election to the EALA, Kennedy was the Secretary General of the Kalonzo Musyoka Foundation, "which offers scholarships to orphans and children from low-income backgrounds".

== Other considerations ==
At the EALA, he was elected Vice Chairperson of the Kenyan delegation.

== See also ==
- List of political parties in Kenya
- East African Community
