= Nabilah Naggayi Sempala =

Ugandan politician (born 1972)

- Born: April 1972 (age 54)
- Citizenship: Uganda
- Education: Mengo Senior School (high school diploma); Saarland University (Diploma in Translation); Makerere University (Bachelor of Arts) (Master of Public Administration)
- Occupation: Politician
- Years active: 2006–present
- Title: Member of Parliament for Kampala Women Constituency (2006–2021)

Nabilah Naggayi Sempala (born 1972) is a Ugandan politician. As a Member of Parliament she has represented the Kampala Women Parliamentary Constituency in the 10th Ugandan Parliament (2016 to 2021).

== Early life and education ==
Nabilah Naggayi was born in Uganda in April 1972. She attended Kibuli Demonstration School for her primary education before she transferred to Kibuli Secondary School for her O‑Level studies. She then completed her A-Level education at Mengo Senior School, graduating with a high school diploma in 1992.

In 1994, Naggayi graduated with a Diploma in Translation from Saarland University, in Saarbrücken, Germany. In 1996, she went off to obtain a Bachelor of Arts degree from Makerere University, the oldest and largest public university in Uganda. Her degree of Master of Arts in Public Administration, was awarded by Makerere University in 2011.

== Career ==
Naggayi began her political career as a Councilor in Wakiso District Local Government in 2001, serving in that capacity until 2005. She, with others, including Muhammad Nsereko, the incumbent member of Parliament for Kampala Central Division, established the Social Democratic Party (SDP). She actively campaigned for the re-opening of the political space to multi-party democracy during the 2005 referendum. It was not until the run-up to the 2006 general elections that she formally joined the Forum for Democratic Change (FDC) political party.

In 2006, at the age of 35, she unseated Margaret Nantongo Zziwa of the National Resistance Movement (NRM) political party, to capture the Women Representative's seat for Kampala in the 8th parliament (2006 to 2011).

During the 2011 parliamentary elections, she received 222,724 votes compared to the 164,378 votes her closest challenger, Margaret Zziwa of the NRM received. During 2013, a group of lawyers sued her, the Attorney General of Uganda and the Electoral Commission of Uganda, on a technicality, since the Central Government of Uganda had taken over the management of Kampala on 28 December 2010, and the city had ceased to be regarded as a district.

In 2016, Naggayi faced off with five other contestants, including the incumbent Minister of State for Youth and Children's Affairs, Florence Nakiwala Kiyingi. However, Naggayi won handily. During the debate to remove presidential age limits from the Uganda Constitution, Naggayi was one of the opposition members of parliament who were forcibly removed from the house chamber by security forces, on 27 September 2017, although she had not been suspended by the Speaker.

She stood for the position of lord mayor for the 2021-2026 elections and lost to Erias Lukwago.

== See also ==
- Forum for Democratic Change
- Kampala Capital City Authority
