= Alintuma Nsambu =

Ugandan politician and diplomat

His Excellency Alintuma Nsambu John Chrysostom

[[Uganda Ambassador to Canada, Bahamas and Maghreb|Uganda Minister to Canada, Bahamas and Maghreb]]
- Former
- In office 2006–2011
- Appointed by: Yoweri Museveni
- President: Yoweri Museveni
- Minister: Information & Communication Technology
- Succeeded by: Nyombi Thembo
- Constituency: Bukoto County East, Bukoto South

Personal details
- Spouse: Susan Nakawuki
- Occupation: Politician, Ugandan diplomat

Alintuma Nsambu also known as Alintuma Nsambu John Chrysostom is a Ugandan diplomat, politician and legislator. He served as the former state minister for information & communication technology from 2006 until 2011. He was shuffled from the cabinet to Diplomatic Service and replaced by Nyombi Thembo in the cabinet reshuffle of 27 May 2011.

== Background and education ==
Nsambu studied at the United States International University in San Diego and also at the Technical University of Braunschweig in Germany.

== Career ==
From 1996 to 2000, Nsambu served as the officer-in-charge and coordinator for the Exchange Students’ Program of the European Union at the Technical University of Braunschweig in Germany.

Nsambu served as the elected member of Parliament representing Bukoto County East in the Masaka District from 2001 until 2011. During the 2011 national election cycle, he controversially lost to Florence Namayanja, of the Democratic Party.

Nsambu served as the appointed ambassador of Uganda to Eritrea but he ended up serving as a Uganda's High Commissioner to Canada.

In 2013, he contested for MP Bukoto South Constituency in Lwengo District where he narrowly lost to the former Democratic Party secretary the Late Matia Nsubuga Birekerawo.

There is a theory that Nsambu's losses were caused by the then Police Chief, Gen.Kale Kayihura who is believed to have manipulated the results. While still a minister, Nsambu is believed to have refused to take a bribe from Kayihura to award an ID production project to his company associates in France.

Immediately after the elections, President Museveni named Alintuma Nsambu Uganda's Ambassador to Canada, Cuba and the Bahamas.

In 2016, President Museveni posted Nsambu to Algiers as Uganda's Ambassador to the Maghreb region (Tunisia, Morocco, Mauritania, Algeria).

== Works ==
Alintuma Nsambu is best remembered for his charity work in establishing computer laboratories in Ugandan schools with the hand of Bill Gates' daughter - Jennifer Gates and with the Bellevue area schools in Washington State.

As Minister, Alintuma Nsambu advised President Museveni to establish a national data bank for the citizens of Uganda and that marked the beginning of the National Identification Project that has enabled every Ugandan adult to have an National ID.

As a Minister for ICT, Alintuma Nsambu initiated the Mobile Money policy among Telecos which is now the most popular platform for transferring money in Uganda.

== Personal life ==
Nsambu married Susan Nakawuki in 2014.
