= Leontine Nzeyimana =

Burundian politician

Honorable Leontine Nzeyimana
- Born: 27 December 1973 (age 52); Makamba Province, Burundi
- Education: Tumaini University (BBA); United States International University (MIR)
- Occupation: Politician
- Years active: 2005–present
- Title: Cabinet Minister for the East African Community in the cabinet of Burundi

Leontine Nzeyimana (born 27 December 1973) is a Burundian politician who has served as Minister of East African Community Affairs, in the Office of the President of Burundi, effective 8 May 2012. She is a member of the Burundian cabinet. Prior to that, from August 2011 until May 2012, she was the elected Member of Parliament for the Province of Makamba.

== Early life and education ==
Leontine Nzeyimana was born on 27 December 1979, in Nyanza Lac commune, in Makamba Province, in the southern part of Burundi. She attended local primary and secondary schools.

She studied at Tumaini University at their campus at Iringa Town (now University of Iringa), graduating in 2002, with a Bachelor of Business Administration. Her Master of International Relations degree was obtained from United States International University, in 2005.

== Career ==
In 2005, Léontine Nzeyimana served as an assistant to the Chief Adviser to the "Rule of Law Project" for the rehabilitation of Burundi. She then worked at the Bank of the Republic of Burundi from 2006 until 2007, as assistant to the Central Bank Governor, where her duties included the daily itinerary of the Governor, and translation of documents from French to English and from English to French.

She then joined the United Nations Development Programme (UNDP), working there from 2007 until 2010. Her work focused on the improvement of the functioning of the Burundi judiciary.

In addition to her ministerial duties in Burundi, Leontine Nzeyimana serves as a member of the fourth East African Legislative Assembly (2017–2022).

== Other considerations ==
As a member of the Burundi National Assembly, she served as the Secretary of the Standing Committee in charge of Political Affairs, Administrative, Foreign Affairs and the East African Community.

She is reported to be fluent in four languages; Kirundi, French, English and Kiswahili.
