= Marie Claire Barikukiye =

Burundian politician

Marie Claire Barikukiye is a Burundian politician who served as a representative in the East African Legislative Assembly from 2017 to 2022.
