= Anita Mugeni =

Rwandan judge

Anita Mugeni (born 1970) is a Rwandan judge and current vice-president of the East African Court of Justice (EACJ) who was acting president of Rwanda Bar Association.

== Education and career ==
Anita Mugeni earned her first law degree from the National University of Rwanda in 1996 and a master's degree in law from FUSL-UC Louvain, Belgium in 2005. She began her legal career in 1998 as a litigation and commercial attorney. She is a founding partner of MRB Attorneys. She was a member of the Council of East African Law Society, and served as a commissioner of Public Service Commission and National Consultative committee on EAC Political Federation. She was appointed to the East African Court of Justice Appellate Division in 2021 and was appointed vice-president of the court in May 2023 replacing Tanzanian judge, Sauda Mjasiri following her retirement from the court.
