= Sylvia Nayebale =

Ugandan politician

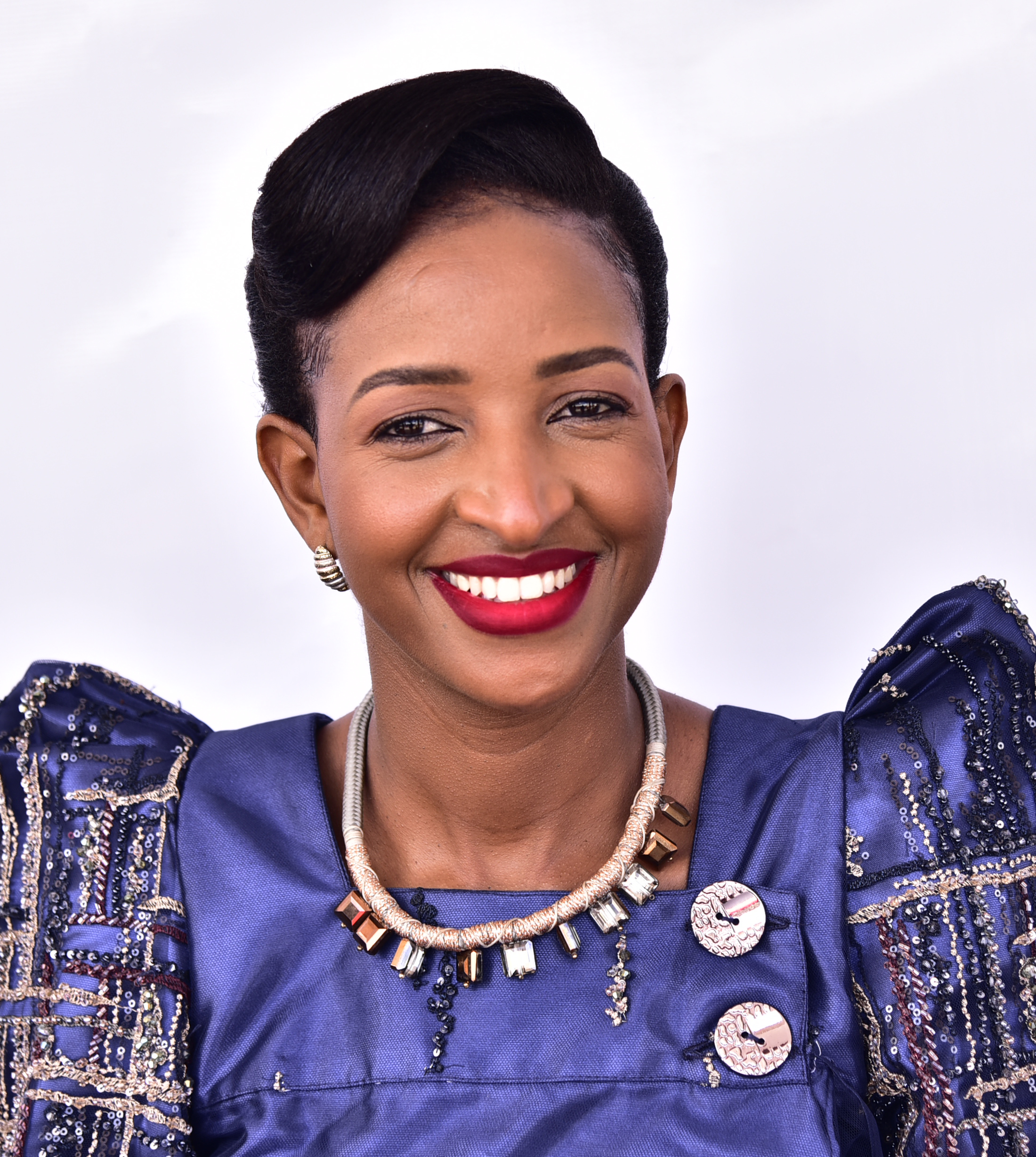
- Born: 22 November 1990 (age 35)
- Citizenship: Uganda
- Education: Makerere University (Bachelor of Mass Communication)
- Occupations: Journalist, Businesswoman & Politician
- Years active: 2007 to present
- Known for: Politics
- Title: Member of Parliament for Gomba District Women's Constituency

Sylvia Nayebale (born 22 November 1990) is a Ugandan journalist, businesswoman and politician, who serves as the incumbent Member of Parliament representing the Gomba District Women Constituency in the 10th Ugandan Parliament (2016 to 2021). She was re-elected in 2021 in the same position.

She was re-elected to represent the people of the Gomba district as a woman member of parliament in the 12th Parliament of Uganda (2026–2031) and was sworn in with the other members of the 12th Parliament in May 2026.

She serves as the chairperson of the Committee on Tourism, Trade and Industry for the 2026–2031 term.

== Early life and education ==
Nayebale was born on 22 November 1990, in Gomba District, in the Buganda Region of Uganda. She attended local schools for her primary education. She studied at Nabisunsa Girls' Secondary School for her O-Level and A-Level schooling. In 2008, she was admitted to Makerere University, Uganda's oldest and largest public university, graduating in 2011, with a Bachelor of Mass Communication degree.

== Work experience ==
Prior to joining full-time politics, she worked as a receptionist at Royal Suites, a hospitality establishment. During her final undergraduate year, she worked as a news reporter for Uganda Broadcasting Corporation, the government-owned media house.

For a two-year period, between 2011 and 2013, Sylvia served as the personal assistant to the Minister for State for Economic Monitoring in the Office of the President of Uganda. In 2013 she was elected Chairperson of Gomba Action for Development, a non-government organisation, where she still serves as of October 2018.

== Political career ==
During the 2016 national election cycle, Ms. Sylvia Nayebale won the Gomba District women's constituency on the ruling National Resistance Movement political party. She is currently the incumbent Member of Parliament for that constituency.

During the NRM primaries, Nayebale beat the then incumbent member of parliament, Nakato Kyabangi who polled 9,297 votes to Nayebale's 21,835 votes. In the 10th Ugandan Parliament she is a member of the Parliamentary Committee on Health and of the Parliamentary Committee on HIV/AIDS and Related Diseases.

== Family ==
Ms. Sylvia Nayebale is married.

== See also ==
- Anna Ebaju Adeke
- Winnie Kiiza
- Lillian Nakate
