= Sylvia Bahireira Tumwekwase =

Ugandan politician and nurse

Hon. Sylvia Bahireira Tumwekwase
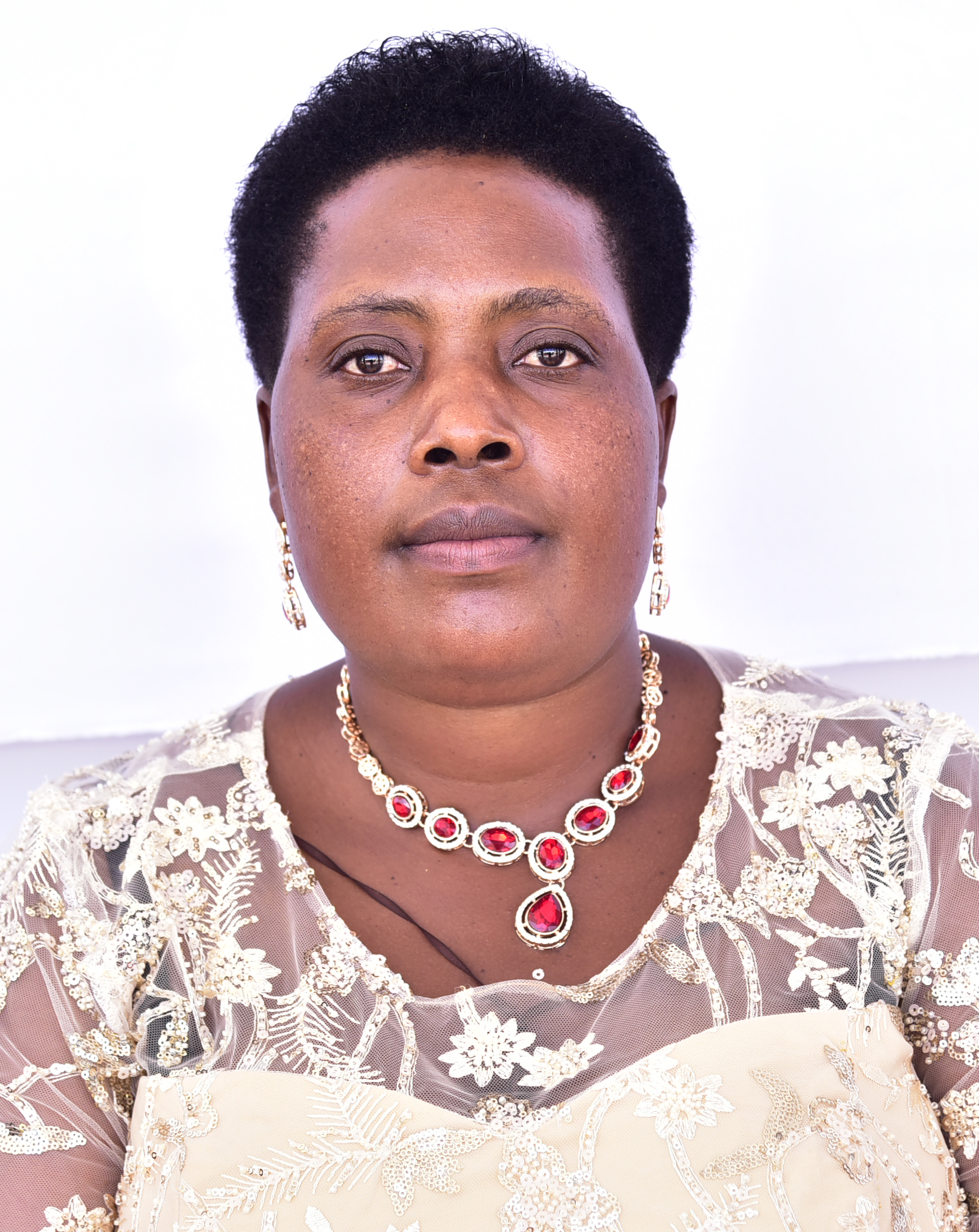

Member of Parliament

Personal details
- Born: Kamwenge District
- Education: Clarke International University
- Occupation: Politician
- Profession: Nurse
- Committees: The committee on Health in the Parliament of Uganda in 2021 to 2022 The Committee on Government Assurance and Implementation in the Parliament of Uganda

Sylvia Bahireira Tumwekwase, known as Omushaho, is a Ugandan politician, legislator and nurse by profession. She is the woman Member of Parliament for Kamwenge District in the eleventh parliament of Uganda. She was also a member of Uganda's Parliamentary Health Committee from 2021 to 2022 and Government Assurances Committee.

== Background and education ==
Bahireira was born in Kamwenge District in western Uganda in the Tooro Kingdom.

Bahireira graduated from Clarke International University (CIU) with a Bachelors of Science in Nursing in 2012. She graduated with a Masters of Science in Nursing from Uganda Martrys University Nkozi.

== Career and work experience ==
Bahireira served as senior nursing and midwifery officer at Rukungyu Hospital in Kamwenge District. She worked as the acting health officer for Kamwenge District. Bahireira later left government employment and joined a Belgian developing agency as she was pursuing her political goals. In 2020, she contested as the National Resistance Movement (NRM) flag bearer but she lost to Azairwe Dorothy Kabaraitsya.

In 2021, Bahireira stood for woman member of parliament for Kamwenge district as an independent candidate where she got 38,309 votes and merged as the winner against Azairwe Dorothy Kabaraitsya who had 36,601 votes.

Bahireira served on the committee on Health in the Parliament of Uganda in 2021 to 2022. And also on the Committee on Government Assurance and Implementation in the Parliament of Uganda.

== See also ==
- Susan Nakawuki
- Lillian Bagala
- Akumu Catherine Mavenjina
