= Mary Mugyenyi =

Ugandan Politician and Lecturer

Honorable Mary Mugyenyi
- Born: 3 January 1957 (age 69); Nyabushozi District, Uganda
- Citizenship: Ugandan
- Education: Makerere University (Bachelor of Politics and Administration); Dalhousie University, Canada (Master's degree in Education)
- Occupations: Politician, lecturer and entrepreneur
- Years active: 2001–present
- Known for: Member East African Legislative Assembly
- Spouse: Late Joshua Mugyenyi

Mary Mugyenyi is a Ugandan politician and a representative in the parliament of the East African Legislative Assembly. She is a former member of parliament for Nyabushozi County in Kiruhura District. She is a wife to the former Bank of Uganda executive director Joshua Mugyenyi.

She holds a master's degree in education from Dalhousie University, Canada, and a bachelor's degree in politics and administration from Makerere University. She is the vice chairperson for the Uganda Management Institute Council and a lecturer at Makerere University. She has also served as state minister for agriculture. She is the brain behind the Nshenyi Culture Village, a community-based tourism initiative based in Ntungamo District. She is a one-of-a-kind person who believes that money is letting down the development of East African politics.

In 2013, she and Makerere staff honored her late husband and former political lecturer Joshua Baitwa Mugyenyi at Makerere University together with Ephraim Kamuntu.
