= Daniel Kidega =

Ugandan politician

4th Speaker of the East African Legislative Assembly
- In office 19 December 2014 – 30 June 2017
- Preceded by: Margaret Zziwa

Member of Parliament
- In office 2001–2006

Personal details
- Born: 10 October 1973 (age 52) Gulu
- Party: NRM
- Education: Kyambogo University (Diploma in Biochemistry); Uganda Christian University (Bachelor of Business Administration); Lund University (Diploma in International Trade) (MSc in International Trade)

Daniel Fred Kidega (born 10 October 1973) is a Ugandan politician and former speaker of the East African Legislative Assembly, in office from December 2014 until June 2017. As of August 2020, he was the chairman of Atiak Sugar Factory, in Amuru District, in which the Uganda government owned 40 percent shareholding.

== Early life and education ==
Kidega was born at St. Mary's Hospital Lacor, in Gulu City on 10 December 1973. He attended Christ the King Demonstration School in Gulu for his elementary schooling. His father, Dusman Okee Sr. (5 January 1942 – 3 January 2016), is also the father of Norbert Mao.

Kidega transferred to Ntare School in Mbarara for his high school education. He studied at Kyambogo University, at that time called Kyambogo Polytechnic. He graduated from Kyambogo with a Diploma in Biochemistry. He then joined Uganda Christian University in Mukono, graduating with a Bachelor of Business Administration degree. Later, he studied at Lund University in Lund, Sweden, obtaining a diploma in International Trade and a Master of Science in International Trade.

== Career ==
Kidega was a student leader in the 1990s, rising to the rank of chairman of the National Youth Council. He worked as the private secretary to the vice president of Uganda from 2000 to 2001. Kidega was a member of President Museveni's national campaign taskforce in 2001. He served as a member of Parliament in the Seventh Parliament from 2001 until 2006, as a national youth representative. He is a member of the National Executive Council (NEC), the highest organ of the ruling National Resistance Movement political party. He was a member of Museveni's national campaign team in 2011. Kidega was first elected to the EALA in 2007 and was re-elected for a second term in 2012.

On 19 December 2014 Kidega was elected unopposed as the fourth speaker of the East African Legislative Assembly, replacing Margaret Zziwa of Uganda, who was impeached by the Assembly for "alleged impunity, incompetence, intimidation of members, among other reasons". He served the remainder of his predecessor's term until June 2017.

== See also ==
- East African Community
