= East African Legislative Assembly =

Legislature of the East African Community

East African Legislative Assembly Swahili: Bunge la Afrika Mashariki

History
- Founded: 30 November 2001

Leadership
- Speaker: Joseph Ntakirutimana

Structure
- Seats: 62 (56 elected members, 8 ex-officio members)
- Political groups: Independents: 50 seats Jubilee Party: 5 seats National Super Alliance: 4 seats Rwandan Patriotic Front: 1 seat Vacant: 2 seats

Meeting place
- Arusha, Tanzania

Website
- www.eala.org

The East African Legislative Assembly (EALA) is a sub-organ of the larger East African Community, being the legislative arm of the Community. Members are sworn into five-year terms.

== History ==
Since colonial times, a number of organizations have sought to integrate the region of East Africa. During the Victorian Era, rail links were established, and a number of regional organizations, such as the East African Currency Board and the East African Court of Appeal were established. A new wave of agreements and organizations were launched during the mid-20th century.

The Treaty for East African Co-operation was signed in 1967, launching the East African Community. However, due to political differences and weak participation, the treaty was nullified in 1977, ending the East African Community.

Despite this, interest in further regional cooperation continued. On 14 May 1984, the East African Community Mediation Agreement was signed, which pledged to "explore and identify areas for future co-operation and to make arrangements for such co-operation". On 26 November 1994, representatives from Uganda, Kenya, and Tanzania signed the Agreement for the Establishment of a Permanent Tripartite Commission, which established a commission to further cooperation among the three countries. On 29 April 1999, the Tripartite Commission completed its analysis on the prospects of regional cooperation, and the three countries signed an agreement to upgrade the Agreement to a treaty for 2000.

=== First Assembly (2001–2006) ===
The East African Legislative Assembly was inaugurated on 30 November 2001 as the legislative arm of the newly revived East African Community. The Assembly met in Arusha, Tanzania, where the Tripartite Commission announced it would upgrade to a treaty. Abdulrahman Kinana, an Elected Member from Tanzania was unanimous elected the Speaker of the First Assembly. The First Assembly met until 2006.

=== Second Assembly (2007–2012) ===
On 1 July 2007, Burundi and Rwanda joined the East African Community, and, therefore, the East Africa Legislative Assembly. Abdirahim Abdi of Kenya served the Speaker of the Second Assembly.

Chama Cha Mapinduzi: 7 seats CNDD-FDD: 4 seats KANU: 2 seats CNDD: 1 seat FORD Kenya: 1 seat FORD People's Party: 1 seat MRC: 1 seat United Democratic Party: 1 seat UPRONA: 1 seat independents: 23 seats CUD: 3 seats

The elected members of the second EALA (2007–12) break down by political party as follows:

Political party	Burundi	Kenya	Rwanda	South Sudan	Tanzania	Uganda	TOTAL
Independents or unspecified		5	9	N/A		9	23
Chama Cha Mapinduzi				N/A	7		7
CNDD-FDD	4			N/A			4
KANU		2		N/A			2
CNDD	1			N/A			1
FORD Kenya		1		N/A			1
FORD People's Party		1		N/A			1
MRC	1			N/A			1
United Democratic Party				N/A	1		1
UPRONA	1			N/A			1
Chama cha Umma Demokrati			1	N/A	1	1	3
Totals	9	9	8	N/A	9	8	45

Elected Members of the East African Legislative Assembly
Name	Country	Political Party
Abdirahim Haithar Haji Abdi	Kenya	
Catherine N Kimura	Kenya	
Christopher Dove Nakuleu	Kenya	
Gervase Mathias Buluma Kafwa Akhaabi	Kenya	
Clarkson Otieno Karan	Kenya	
Sarah Talaso Bonaya	Kenya	
Augustine Loile Chemonges Lotodo	Kenya	
Reuben Oyondi Oyondi	Kenya	
Safina Kwekwe Tsungu	Kenya	
George Francis Nangale	Tanzania	
Abdullah Ali Hassan Mwinyi	Tanzania	
Kate Sylivia / Magdalena Kamba	Tanzania	
Walid Aman Kabourou	Tanzania	
Fortunatus Lwanyantika Masha	Tanzania	
Didas John Massaburi	Tanzania	
Said Gharib Bilal	Tanzania	
Sebtuu Mohamed Nassor	Tanzania	
Janet Deo Mmari	Tanzania	
Mike Sebalu	Uganda	
Lydia Wanyoto Wanyoto	Uganda	
Dora Kanabahita Byamukama	Uganda	
Daniel Fred Kidega	Uganda	
Bernard Mulengani	Uganda	
Mugisha Oyera Muntu	Uganda	
Dan Wandera Ogalo	Uganda	
Nusura Tiperu Omar	Uganda	
	Uganda	
Francois Bizimana	Burundi	
Regine Katabarumwe	Burundi	
Leonce Ndarubagiye	Burundi	
Frederic Ngenzebuhoro	Burundi	
Georgette Nibitanga	Burundi	
Nzobonimpa Manasse	Burundi	
	Burundi	
	Burundi	
	Burundi	
Abdul Karim Harerimana	Rwanda	Rwandan Patriotic Front
James Ndahiro	Rwanda	representative for the disabled
Odette Nyiramirimo	Rwanda	representative for civil society
Pierre Damian Habumuremyi	Rwanda	Rwandan Patriotic Front
Claire Kayirangwa	Rwanda	Rwandan Patriotic Front
Patricia Hajabakiga	Rwanda	Rwandan Patriotic Front
Jacqueline Muhongayire	Rwanda	Social Democratic Party
Straton Ndikuryayo	Rwanda	representative for youth
Valerie Nyirahabineza	Rwanda	representative for women

=== Third Assembly (2012–2017) ===
Margaret Zziwa of Uganda served as the speaker from 2012 to 2014. She was the first woman to head the regional assembly and defeated her only rival Dora Byamukama 27 votes to 18 in the first round and 33 votes to 12 in the runoff. She was succeeded by Daniel Kidega, who served from 2014 until the end of the Third Assembly in 2017.

Elected Members of the East African Legislative Assembly
Name	Country	Political Party
Margaret Zziwa	Uganda	
Dora Byamukama	Uganda	
Dan Kidega	Uganda	
Fred Mbidde Mukasa	Uganda	
Bernard Mulengani	Uganda	
Susan Nakawuki	Uganda	
Chris Opoka-Okumu	Uganda	
Mike Sebalu	Uganda	
Nusura Tiperu	Uganda	
Nancy Abisai	Kenya	
Abubakar Zein Abubakar	Kenya	
Sarah Bonaya	Kenya	
Peter Mathuki	Kenya	
Mumbi Ngaru	Kenya	
Saole Ole Nkanae	Kenya	
Abubakar Ogle	Kenya	
Joseph Kiangoi	Kenya	
Judith Pareno	Kenya	
Shy-Rose Bhanji	Tanzania	
Adam Kimbisa	Tanzania	
Angela Kizigha	Tanzania	
Bernard Murunya	Tanzania	
Abdullah Mwinyi	Tanzania	
Perprtua Nderakindo	Tanzania	
Makongoro Nyerere	Tanzania	
Issa Taslima	Tanzania	
Mariam Ussi Yahya	Tanzania	
Emerence Bucumi	Burundi	
Hafsa Mossi	Burundi	
Isabelle Ndahayo	Burundi	
Leonce Ndarubagiye	Burundi	
Martin Nduwimana	Burundi	
Emmanuel Nengo	Burundi	
Jeremie Ngendakumana	Burundi	
Frederic Ngenzebuhoro	Burundi	
Yves Nsabimana	Burundi	
Christophe Bazivamo	Rwanda	
Patricia Hajabakiga	Rwanda	
Abdulkarim Harelimana	Rwanda	
Jacqueline Muhongayire	Rwanda	
James Ndahiro	Rwanda	
Straton Ndikuryayo	Rwanda	
Valerie Nyirahabineza	Rwanda	
Odette Nyiramilimo	Rwanda	
Pierre Celesitin Rwigema	Rwanda	

=== Fourth Assembly (2017–2022) ===
The Fourth Assembly has a total of 62 members, of which each member state submits 9 elected members, and 8 ex-officio members. Its speaker is Martin Ngoga of Rwanda.

The following table lists the elected members of the Fourth Assembly of the East African Legislative Assembly:

Elected Members of the East African Legislative Assembly
Name	Country	Political Party
Mnyaa Habib Mohamed	Tanzania	
Nkuhi Fancy Haji	Tanzania	
Maryam Ussi Yahya	Tanzania	
Kimbisa Adam Omar	Tanzania	
Hasnuu Makame Abullah	Tanzania	
Lugiko Happyness Elias	Tanzania	
Maghembe Ngwaru	Tanzania	
Maasay Pamela Simon	Tanzania	
Josephine Sebastian Lemoyan	Tanzania	
Thoar Gatpan Gideon	South Sudan	
Jago Odok Woda Jeremiah	South Sudan	
Ann Itto Leonardo	South Sudan	
Gabriel Garang Aher Arol	South Sudan	
Kim Gai Ruot Duop	South Sudan	
Deng Dut Gatkek Thomas	South Sudan	
Gabriel Alaak Garang Diing	South Sudan	
Deng Nhial Gai	South Sudan	
Ayason Mukulia Kennedy	South Sudan	
Christopher Opoka-Okumu	Uganda	
Susan Nakawuki	Uganda	
Fred Mukasa Mbidde	Uganda	
George Stephen Odongo	Uganda	
Dennis Namara	Uganda	
Musamali Paul Mwasa	Uganda	
Kasamba Mathias	Uganda	
Rose Akol Okullu	Uganda	
Mary Mugyenyi	Uganda	
Flowrence Jematiah Sergon	Kenya	Jubilee Party
Oburu Odinga	Kenya	National Super Alliance
Noor Mohamed Adan	Kenya	Jubilee Party
Wanjiku Muhia	Kenya	Jubilee Party
Simon Mbugua Nganga	Kenya	Jubilee Party
Kennedy Musyoka Kalonzo	Kenya	National Super Alliance
Fatuma Ibrahim Ali	Kenya	National Super Alliance
Aden Omar Abdikadir	Kenya	National Super Alliance
Aburi Mpuru Lawrence	Kenya	Jubilee Party
Pierre-Célestin Rwigema	Rwanda	
Kalinda Francois Xavier	Rwanda	
Martin Ngoga	Rwanda	Rwandan Patriotic Front
Jean Claude Barimuyabo	Rwanda	
Alex Bahati	Rwanda	
Francoise Uwumukiza	Rwanda	
Francine Rutazana	Rwanda	
Fatuma Ndangiza	Rwanda	
Oda Gasinzigwa	Rwanda	
Léontine Nzeyimana	Burundi	
Marie Claire Barikukiye	Burundi	
Sophie Nsavyimana	Burundi	
Alfred Ahingejeje	Burundi	
Mo-Mamo Karerwa	Burundi	
Jean-Marie Muhirwa	Burundi	
Pierre Claver Rurakamvye	Burundi	
Victor Burikukiye	Burundi	
Christopher Nduwayo	Burundi	

The following table lists the ex-officio members of the Fourth Assembly of the East African Legislative Assembly:

Ex-Officio Members of the East African Legislative Assembly
Name	Country	Political Party
Isabelle Ndahayo	Burundi	
Francois Kalinda	Rwanda	
Pierre-Célestin Rwigema	Rwanda	
Maryam Ussi Yahya	Tanzania	
Fred Mukasa Mbidde	Uganda	
Susan Nakawuki	Uganda	
Vacant		
Vacant		

=== Fifth Assembly (2022–2027) ===
The Fifth Assembly was inaugurated on 19 December 2022, which included for the first time 9 members from the Democratic Republic of Congo, which had joined the EALA in March of that year. Joseph Ntakarutimana of Burundi was elected as speaker of the 63-member parliamentary body. In addition to the elected members, the fifth parliament included nine ex-officio members – one from each member nation, the secretary general, and the counsel – who serve as ministers of the East African Community Affairs. The following table lists the elected members of the Fifth Assembly of the East African Legislative Assembly:

Elected Members of the East African Legislative Assembly
Name	Country	Political Party
Jacqueline Amongin	Uganda	
Gerald Blacks Siranda	Uganda	
Veronica Kadogo	Uganda	
James Kakooza	Uganda	
Paul Mwasa Musamali	Uganda	
George Stephen Odongo	Uganda	
Dennis Namara	Uganda	
Mary Mugyenyi	Uganda	
Rose Akol Okullu	Uganda	
Mohame Juma Nadra	Tanzania	
Shogo Richard Mlozi	Tanzania	
James Kinyasi Millya	Tanzania	
Mashaka Khalfan Ngole	Tanzania	
Abdulla Hasnuu Makame	Tanzania	
Maghembe Jumanne Ng'waru	Tanzania	
Machano Ali Machano	Tanzania	
Angela Charles Kizigha	Tanzania	
Ansar Kachwamba	Tanzania	
Gabriel Garang Aher Arol	South Sudan	
Thomson Luke Teny	South Sudan	
Sadia James Sebit	South Sudan	
Deng Gai	South Sudan	
Gai Rut Kim	South Sudan	
Kennedy Aysason Mukulia	South Sudan	
Woda Jeremiah Odok Jago	South Sudan	
Ann Itto Leonardo	South Sudan	
Gideon Gatpa Thoar	South Sudan	
Alex Bahati	Rwanda	
Françoise Uwumukiza	Rwanda	
Clément Musangabatware	Rwanda	
Francine Rutazana	Rwanda	
Aisha Nyiramana	Rwanda	
Mathias Harabemungu	Rwanda	
Alodie Iradukunda	Rwanda	
Caroline Rwivanga Kayonga	Rwanda	
Fatuma Ndangiza	Rwanda	
Suleiman Said Shahbal	Kenya	
David Ole Sankok	Kenya	
Winnie Odinga	Kenya	
Maina Godfrey Mwangi	Kenya	
Zipporah Kering Kurga	Kenya	
James Mathenge Kanini	Kenya	
Kennedy Musyoka Kalonzo	Kenya	
Falhada Dekow Iman	Kenya	
Hassan Omar Hassan	Kenya	
François Mangu Ngate	Democratic Republic of Congo	
Stella Nyota Mwetaminwa	Democratic Republic of Congo	
Joseph Mbombo Mundela	Democratic Republic of Congo	
Jérémie Ilenda Maswama	Democratic Republic of Congo	
Dorothé Nganiza Masirika	Democratic Republic of Congo	
Géraldine Kalwa Kaubo	Democratic Republic of Congo	
Evariste Kwete Kalala	Democratic Republic of Congo	
Jean-Bertrand Ewanga	Democratic Republic of Congo	
Désiré Ipenda Boulu	Democratic Republic of Congo	
Olivier Nkurunziza	Burundi	
Anastase Manirambona	Burundi	
Saidi Kibeya	Burundi	
Cathy Kezimana	Burundi	
Mo-Mamo Karerwa	Burundi	
Victor Burikukiye	Burundi	
Goreth Bigirimana	Burundi	
Gabriel Ntisezerana	Burundi	
Joseph Ntakirutimana	Burundi	

== Composition ==
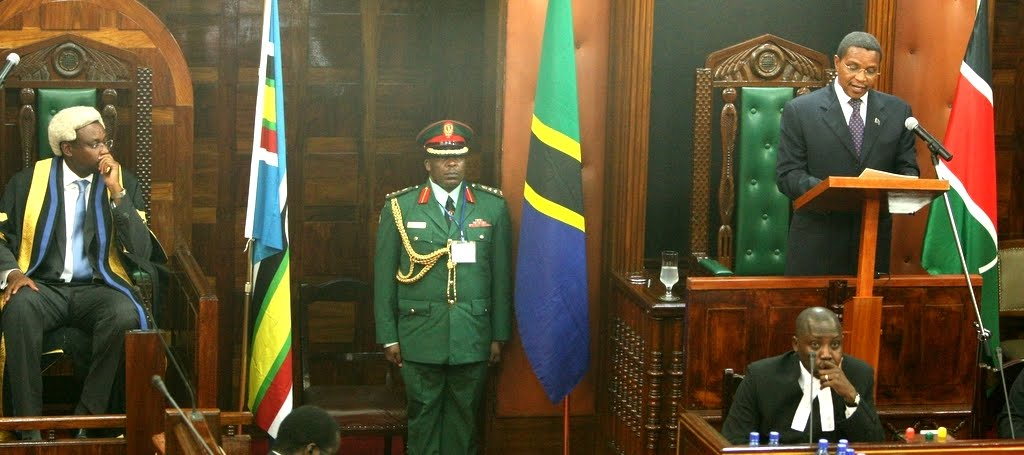
Tanzanian President Jakaya Kikwete addressing the Assembly

As of the Fourth Assembly, the East African Legislative Assembly has 62 members, of which each member state submits 9 elected members, and 8 ex-officio members.

According to Article 50 of the East African Community Treaty, members are elected by their respective country's national legislature. Article 50 also calls upon said members to reflect their country's political parties, opinions, gender composition, and other special groups.

The ex-officio members of the Assembly are to be each member state's minister for regional cooperation, the Secretary General of the East African Community, and the Counsel to the Community.

== Functions ==
Article 49 of the East African Community Treaty stipulates that the responsibilities of the East African Legislative Assembly are to "be the legislative organ of the Community", "liaise with the National Assemblies of the Partner States on matters relating to the Community", "debate and approve the budget of the Community", "consider annual reports on the activities of the Community, annual audit reports of the Audit Commission and any other reports referred to it by the Council", "discuss all matters pertaining to the Community and make recommendations to the Council as it may deem necessary for the implementation of the Treaty", "establish any committee or committees for such purposes as it deems necessary", "recommend to the Council the appointment of the Clerk and other officers of the Assembly", and "make its rules of procedure and those of its committees".

== Committees ==
As Article 49 of the East African Community Treaty outlines, the East African Legislative Assembly has the right to "establish any committee or committees for such purposes as it deems necessary". As of 2020, the Assembly has the following seven committees:

- The Commission Committee
- The Accounts Committee
- The Committee on Legal, Rules, and Privileges
- The Committee on Agriculture, Tourism and Natural Resources
- The Committee on Regional Affairs and Conflict Resolution
- The Committee on Communication, Trade and Investment
- The Committee on General Purpose

== Activities since inauguration ==
Since its inauguration, EALA has held several sittings as a Plenary in Arusha, Kampala and Nairobi. During these sittings, EALA has:

- adopted its rules of procedure;
- elected the Speaker of the Assembly;
- recommended to the Council of Ministers the appointment of the Officers of the Assembly;
- approved the budgets for the EAC for the 2002–03 and 2003–04 fiscal years;
- asked the Council of Ministers 19 questions, which were duly answered;
- adopted five resolutions;
- held seminars on a wide range of issues in relation to their mandate; and
- passed six bills into law.

The Committees have continuously got briefs from the Secretariat and given advice with regard to progress in the implementation of the Treaty.

== Impact ==
One 2015 paper suggested that the structure of the East African Community Treaty created the East African Community in a way that the East African Legislative Assembly often butted heads with the East African Community Council of Ministers, which harmed the efficacy of the Assembly.
