= Ssendi Mosh Afrikan =

Ugandan radio and television personality

- Born: May 27, 1982; Seeta, Mukono District, Uganda
- Other name: Mr Mosh Live
- Citizenship: Uganda
- Education: Cavendish University Kampala (BA in Journalism and Communication Studies)
- Occupations: Radio and television personality, events MC, media coach, social activist, politician
- Employer(s): Formerly at WBS TV, Urban TV, Galaxy FM, Spark TV
- Organization: Zenji Talent School (Founder)
- Known for: Media, entertainment, youth activism, politics
- Office: Lord Councilor, Makindye East III, Kampala Capital City Authority (KCCA)
- Political party: National Unity Platform
- Movement: People Power, Our Power
- Parent(s): Hassan Wasswa (father, deceased), Kulthum (mother)
- Awards: 3x Teens Best Radio Personality (Galaxy FM)

Ssendi Mosh Afrikan (born May 27, 1982), popularly known by his stage name Mr Mosh Live, is a Ugandan radio and television personality, events MC, media coach, social activist and politician

He is a Lord Councilor representing Makindye East III in the Kampala Capital City Authority (KCCA) council, the authority managing Uganda's capital Kampala.

== Biography ==
Ssendi Mosh Afrikan was born in 1982 to the late Hassan Wasswa and Mrs. Kulthum in Seeta, Uganda. His father served in Uganda's army as a military pilot.

Mosh went to Mwiiri Primary School and Jinja Army Boarding School before entering St. Francis Secondary School for his ordinary level of education..

He later enrolled at Old Kampala Secondary school for his advanced level of education and Cavendish University Uganda for a bachelor's degree in journalism and communication studies.

== Music and media career ==
While at Old Kampala Secondary school, Mosh began organizing school entertainment events after impressing a school dance.

In the early 2000s, he met with Uganda artists Bebe Cool, Jose Chameleone, and Bobi Wine, who at the time, were in the early stages of their music careers. The trio was performing at a local event and Mosh was given the opportunity to showcase his freestyle skills which he did to the amusement of many.

He would later meet with the singing group Ngoni to record his first song "Ndi ku diggi", a collaboration with the group.

The song received airplay on Uganda's and East African radio and television stations. The success of the song led to his employed by WBS Television where he hosted the Top of the charts show.

Mosh quit WBS TV to join Vision Group's Urban TV and later Galaxy FM 100.2, a top youth leaning radio station based in Kampala in 2012 where he won 3 awards as the Teens Best Radio Personality.

At Galaxy FM Mosh also worked as the station's PR, Brand and Social Media Manager. In 2016, he was recruited by Nation Media's Spark Television and hosted a hit afternoon show called "cheza".

He accompanied his radio, music, and television career, with jobs as Master of Ceremonies at mainly international music events featuring Grammy winners, Shaggy, Wyclef Jean, Beenieman, Morgan Heritage and others like Tarrus Riley, Konshens, Busy Signal Burna Boy among many others.

He quit television and radio in 2020 for personal reasons. Later that year launched Zenji Talent School, a youth centre for low cost media, digital and visual arts skills training, in a bid to help poor Kampala urban youth attain market-ready skills.

== Political career and activism ==
In 2021, Mosh participated in Uganda's General elections. He contested for the post of Lord Councilor Makindye Division in Uganda's capital Kampala. He was elected, becoming Makindye East III Councilor in the Kampala Capital City Authority, the council governing the city.

He is the Chairperson Gender, Community Services, and Production Committee in the same council. Mosh is also a member of the city's Education and Social Services Committee

Mosh is a member of the opposition National Unity Platform party led by Bobi Wine.
