= Abdikadir Aden =

Kenyan politician

Abdikadir Omar Aden

Member of the National Assembly of Kenya
- In office 2013–2017
- Preceded by: Office established
- Succeeded by: Omar Shurie
- Constituency: Balambala Constituency

Personal details
- Born: October 21, 1972 (age 53) Balambala, Garissa County, Kenya
- Party: Orange Democratic Movement (ODM)
- Other political affiliations: United Democratic Alliance (UDA)
- Education: United States International University (BBA); London South Bank University (MBA)
- Occupation: Politician, Business Executive
- Profession: Business Executive, Politician
- Known for: First MP for Balambala Constituency
- Committees: Budget and Appropriation Committee; * Procedure and House Rules Committee

Abdikadir Omar Aden (born 21 October 1972) is a Kenyan politician. He was a member of the 11th parliament of Kenya elected from Balambala Constituency, Garissa County on the ticket of Orange Democratic Movement in 2013. He lost his reelection bid in 2017.

== Education and career ==
Abdikadir Aden was born in 1972 in Balambala in Garissa County. He attended Balambala Primary School from 1982 to 1989 before proceeding to Lenana School where he studied from 1990 to 1993. He earned a bachelor's degree in international business administration majoring in marketing from United States International University in 1999 and obtained a master's degree in international business from South Bank University, London in 2002. He started his career with Standard Chartered bank in September 2002 and became business development manager in 2003 before being promoted to the position of corporate sales manager in 2004 and served until 2006 when he transferred to British American Tobacco (BAT). He became BAT general manager in 2008 and remained in the position until 2011 when he was appointed BAT general manager of Horn of Africa Markets and served until 2013 when left BAT.

He joined politics in 2013 and was elected to the 11th Kenyan national assembly for Balambala Constituency on the ticket of ODM. He was the first MP for Balambala following its creation in the new constitution of Kenya. In the 11th parliament, he served on the Procedure and House Rules Committee. He lost his reelection bid in 2017 and failed to reclaim the seat in the 2022 parliamentary on the ticket of UDA. He was ODM organizing secretary and a member of Budget and Appropriation committee.
