= Nakato Kyabangi Katusiime =

Ugandan politician

- Born: 23 December 1972 (age 53)
- Citizenship: Uganda
- Occupation: Politician
- Years active: 2011-2016
- Known for: Politics
- Title: Member of Parliament for Gomba District Women's Constituency

Nakato Kyabangi Katusiime (born 23 December 1972) is a Ugandan politician and former Member of Parliament (MP) for the Gomba District. She was the Woman member of the Uganda's 9th Parliament affiliated to the National Resistance Movement (NRM). She among the Members of Parliament who were awarded the Golden Jubilee Medals on October 9, 2012.

== Political career ==
During the 2011 national election cycle, Ms Nakato Kyabangi won the Gomba District women's constituency, on the ruling National Resistance Movement political party. During the NRM primaries, Nakato Kyabangi lost to Nayebale as she polled 9,297 votes and Nayebale received 21,835 votes.

== Controversies and legal issues ==
In 2014, Nakato Kyabangi Katusiime faced legal consequences due to an outstanding debt owed to Kenroy Investments (U) Ltd. The debt amounted to UGX 79 million (approximately US$22,000 at the time). Despite court orders and a warrant of arrest issued against her, she did not comply. As a result, the High Court Criminal Division sentenced her to civil prison.

== See also ==
- List of members of the ninth Parliament of Uganda
- Sylvia Nayebale
