= Gabriel Garang Aher Arol =

South Sudanese politician

Gabriel Garang Aher Arol is a South Sudanese politician. He served as a member of the East African Legislative Assembly from 2017 to 2022.
