= Fatuma Gedi =

Kenyan politician from Wajir

Fatuma Gedi is a Kenyan politician from Wajir town. A former member of the National Assembly from Wajir county. The former Women representative for Wajir county. In 2017 she won the seat through Party for development and reform, under the reign of the fourth president of the Republic of Kenya, Uhuru Muigai Kenyatta.

She lost her seat after 2022 Kenya general election to Fatuma Abdi Jehow, a member of Orange Democratic Movement (ODM).

== Early life and education ==
Fatuma Gedi, a daughter of Mzee Gedi Ali. She lost her dad on 27th Sunday December 2020. Gedi was born in 1988 in Wajir town, in the North Eastern part of Kenya. She completed her secondary education in 2004. She then obtained her Diploma in Public Relations between the year 2006-2007 at Regional Institute of Business Management.

== Career ==
Gedi's career journey began in 2008, where she served as a team leader for a study on Female Genital Mutilation (FGM) at the Population Council Organization. Her passion for helping communities continued, as she joined the Save the Children International Organization in 2009 to 2010, serving as a child protection and community mobilizing officer.

Gedi's desire to make a difference led her to become a program officer at the Somali Aid Foundation from 2010 to 2012. It was during this time that Gedi's interest in politics began to grow, and in 2013, she decided to pursue it further.

In January 2014 to March 2016, Gedi served as the Chairperson of the women's league, where she trained trainers on gender and leadership for the United Republican Party (URP).

Since 2015 to date, Gedi has been a consultant on gender issues for the Centre for Multiparty Democracy Organization, where she continues to make an impact in promoting gender equality in politics. She has also served as a consultant on women's participation in leadership for the National Democratic Institute (NDI), further cementing her reputation as an advocate for women's rights and equality.

It was in 2017 August, Kenya general election that Gedi became a Women representative for Wajir County through Party for development and reform (PDR). She served one term as the Member of the National Assembly of Kenya.

She was endorsed by the Wajir elders for the second term as a Women representative for her county though she lost the seat to Fatuma Abdi Jehow, a member of Orange Democratic Movement(ODM). In the North Eastern part of Kenya, the elders pick the leaders, those not favored by the elders, accept the decision though others defy.

The North Eastern part of Kenya is mostly inhabited by the Somalis who are bound by strong cultural and ethnically practices. Politics is projected as a mostly men field, leaving women in the shadows.

== Personal life ==
Gedi was allegedly assaulted by Rashid Kassim, the Wajir East Member of Parliament on 22 October 2019. Witnesses narrate that Mr. Rashid Kassim assaulted Gedi over allocation of money to his constituency. The event caused uproar allover the nation and in the Parliament, the female Members of the National Assembly walked out in solidarity as an act to condemn the assault.

Gedi gained national attention after an alleged sex tape involving her was leaked in 2019. She said her pressing issue on the leaked tape is her children viewing the distorted tape.
