= Usta Kayitesi =

Rwandan lawyer and legal scholar

Usta Kayitesi is a Rwandan legal scholar who is the former Deputy CEO of the Rwanda governance board (RGB). She succeeded Anastase Shyaka following his appointment as Minister of Local Government (MINALOC).

== Education ==
Kayitesi has a PhD in law from the University of Utrecht, the Netherlands, a master of Laws from the University of Ottawa Canada, and bachelor's degree in law from former University of Rwanda.

== Career ==
Kayitesi has a background in academia. She served as a lecturer at the former University of Rwanda (NUR). Later, when NUR merged with all public Universities in Rwanda, she was appointed the principal of the College of Arts and Social Sciences(CASS).

Kayitesi is chief executive officer at Rwanda Governance Board and also served as commissioner in the Rwanda Law reform Commission. She has also contributed to various capacities at UR Law School. In 2015, Kayitesi served as Vice Chairperson of the technical support commission to the Rwandan Parliament for the review of the constitution of the Republic of Rwanda. She has been a member of Rwanda Bar Association and the Easter African Law society.

She has contributed to scholarship on victimological approaches to international crimes in Africa. One of her notable publications is "Prosecution of Genocidal Rape and sexual torture before the gacaca tribunals in Rwanda."

== Selected works ==
=== Books ===
- Genocidal Gender and Sexual Violence: The legacy of the ICTR, Rwanda’s ordinary courts and gacaca courts, 2013

=== Articles ===
- "Prosecution of Genocidal Rape and sexual torture before the gacaca tribunals in Rwanda"
