= Fatuma Ali Saman =

Kenyan educationist and women's rights campaigner

- Born: 1968 (age 57–58); Mandera City, Kenya
- Citizenship: Kenyan
- Education: St Brigid's School, Nairobi; Wajir Girls Secondary School; Asumbi Teachers College
- Occupations: Educationist, women's rights activist
- Employer: Independent Policing Oversight Authority (IPOA)
- Organization(s): Nairobi Muslim Academy; Waqf (Nairobi Islamic charity)
- Known for: Women's rights activism
- Notable work: Advocacy for inclusion of women in leadership; contribution to Kenya Constitution (Bill of Rights and Devolution)
- Title: Board Member, Independent Policing Oversight Authority
- Board member of: Independent Policing Oversight Authority (IPOA)

Fatuma Ali Saman (born 1968) is a Kenyan educationist and women's rights campaigner and a board member of Kenya's Independent Policing Oversight Authority (KIPOA).

== Early life ==
Fatuma Ali Saman was born in Mandera, Northern Kenya in 1968. She lost her father at a young age.

== Education ==
Saman attended St Brigid's School in Nairobi during the post-independence period when the "7-4-2-3 system" was in place. She went on to Wajir girls Secondary School in 1983, leaving in 1986 with grades that qualified her to be admitted to university. However, in 1987, she went to train as a teacher at Asumbi College in South Nyanza, near Kenya's western region. She later went to university, graduating with a bachelor's degree in education, Religion and History.

== Teaching career ==
Saman has been teaching for 25 years at both private and public institutions. Her first teaching post was in 1989 at Mandera boys town (currently known as Mandera Islamic Centre) which was a government school. In 1993, she became deputy head teacher of Khadija Ummul-Muminun, a government-owned girls' primary school.

In 1995, Saman co-founded the Nairobi Muslim Academy, a private fee-paying school which provides nursery, primary and secondary level education. The objective of founding the Nairobi Muslim Academy, a girls only secondary school in Nairobi Kenya, was to provide a friendly environment for girls’ education as many girls have been affected by early marriage. She remains an advisor at the school.

In 2010, Saman was appointed to serve in the task-force on devolved government. She left teaching in 2012, after she was appointed a board Member of IPOA during the Kenya Coalition government.

== Fighting for women's rights ==
Saman has been an activist for the rights and representation of women in Kenya. She has lobbied for the accommodation of women in public and private leadership positions and their inclusion in various decision-making organisations and boards. Her contribution goes as far as the bill of rights and devolution chapters are concerned in the constitution.

The introduction of new Kenya constitution (also known as the Bomas draft), inaugurated in 2010, includes the two significant parts where Saman worked on as a member of the technical committee on the bill of rights.

Saman advocated for the creation of the positions of 47 women representatives in the Kenyan parliament. She has spearheaded girls' enrolments in schools in Northern Kenya and also fought against female genital mutilation. Saman represented Kenya in the international Visitors leadership program in the US in 2005.

== Community service ==
Saman has voluntarily served different community-based and faith-based organizations through consultancy services. She served on the executive committee of the Inter-religious council of Kenya (IRCK) for 10 years. Her teaching career was driven by the scarcity of teachers which was affecting the quality and standard of education. She has taught in different schools and helped boost the enrolment of orphaned girls through scholarships. Since 1995, Nairobi Islamic charity Waqf, a charity organization she co-founded, has been empowering poor, widowed and divorced women from the Nairobi slums through training and provision of job opportunities.

== Human rights and reforms ==
Fatuma Ali Saman has played a significant role in fighting for freedom and equality in Kenya. One of her biggest achievements includes bringing change to the Kenya police which has been accused of human rights violations in the past. As a board member of the Independent Policing and Oversight Authority, where she chairs the Inspections, Research and Monitoring committee, she has developed recommendations to improve the service.
