= Fatuma Ibrahim Ali =

Kenyan politician

Member of the East African Legislative Assembly
- Incumbent
- Assumed office 18 December 2017

Member of the National Assembly of Kenya
- In office 10 March 2013 – 8 August 2017

Commissioner of the Kenya National Commission on Human Rights

Personal details
- Party: Orange Democratic Movement
- Education: Kenyatta University
- Profession: Politician
- Ethnicity: Somali

Fatuma Ibrahim Ali (Somali: Fadumo Cibraahiim Cali) is a Kenyan politician. She has been a Commissioner of the Kenya National Commission on Human Rights. Ali was a Member of the 11th Session of the Kenyan Parliament representing the Wajir County. She was elected to the position in March 2013 on an Orange Democratic Movement ticket. She is currently a member of the 4th Assembly (2017–2022), of the East African Legislative Assembly representing Kenya. She is of Somali ethnicity.
