= East African Court of Justice =

Judicial body of the East African Community treaty of 1999

- Swahili: Mahakama ya Haki ya Afrika Mashariki
- Established: 30 November 2001
- Jurisdiction: Eight member states of the East African Community
- Location: Arusha, Tanzania
- Composition method: Recommended by Member States and appointed by the Summit
- Authorised by: Treaty for the Establishment of the East African Community.
- Judge term length: 7 years non-renewable
- Number of positions: 8 to 15
- Website: www.eacj.org

President
- Currently: Nestor Kayobera
- Since: February 2021
- Jurist term ends: February 2028

Vice President
- Currently: Anita Mugeni
- Since: February 2021
- Jurist term ends: February 2028

The East African Court of Justice (EACJ) is a treaty-based judicial body of the East African Community tasked to ensure adherence to law in the interpretation and application of and compliance with the East African Community Treaty of 1999. The Court is made up of two divisions: a First Instance Division and an Appellate Division. Its Judges, a maximum of ten in the First Instance Division and of five in the Appellate Division, are appointed by the Summit, the highest organ of the community, from among persons recommended by the Partner States who are of proven integrity, impartiality and independence and fulfill the conditions required in their own countries for high judicial office, or are jurists of recognised competence.

== Jurisdiction ==
The Court has jurisdiction over the interpretation and application of the Treaty and may have other original, appellate, human rights or other jurisdiction upon conclusion of a protocol to realise such extended jurisdiction. Reference to the court may be by Legal and Natural Persons, Partner States and the Secretary General of the community.

The basis upon which any resident in a Partner State may refer for determination by the Court, the legality of any Act, regulation, directive, decision or action of a Partner State or an institution of the Community is on the grounds that it is “unlawful” or an “infringement” of the provisions of the Treaty.

Jurisdiction of national courts is ousted wherever the Treaty confers it on the East African Court, as decisions of the Court on the interpretation and application of the Treaty have precedence over decisions of national courts on a similar matter.

== Judgment ==
It is mandatory the Court considers and determines every reference made to it pursuant to the Treaty in accordance with its rules and then deliver, in public session, a reasoned judgment that, subject to review, is final, binding, conclusive and not open to appeal.

An application for review of a judgment may be made to the Court. But, only if it is based upon the discovery of some fact which intrinsically might have had a decisive influence on the judgment had it been brought to the attention of the Court at the time the judgment was given, but which, at that time in question, was unknown to both the Court and the party making the application, and also which could not, with reasonable diligence, have been discovered by that party before the judgment was made, or on account of some mistake, fraud or error on the face of the record or because an injustice has been done.

The future of other regional courts with conflicting jurisdiction like the Common Market for Eastern and Southern Africa, South African Development Community and the African Court on Human and Peoples' Rights is thrown into serious doubts by virtue of these provisions.

=== Acceptance ===
Any dispute concerning the interpretation or application of the Treaty or any of the matters referred to the Court cannot be subjected to any method of settlement other than those provided for in the Treaty. Where a dispute has been referred to the Court, the Partner States are enjoined to refrain from any action which might be detrimental to the resolution of or might aggravate the dispute further, a Partner State or the Council "must take", without delay, the measures required to implement a judgment of the Court.

== Judges ==
=== Appellate Division ===
- (Burundi) Nestor Kayobera (President)
- (Rwanda) Anita Mugeni (Vice President)
- (Kenya) M'Inoti Kathurima
- (Uganda) Cheberion Barishaki
- (Tanzania) Omar Othman Makungu

=== First Instance Division ===
- (Tanzania) Yohane B. Masara (Principal Judge)
- (South Sudan) Dr. Charles O. Nyawello (Deputy Principal Judge)
- (Rwanda) Richard Muhumuza
- (Uganda) Richard W. Wejuli
- (Burundi) Dr. Leonard Gacuko
- (Democratic Republic of the Congo) Kayembe Kasanda Ignace Rene

Source.

== Comparison to European Court of Human Rights ==
As illustrated above the EACJ has a much wider and comprehensive jurisdiction than the European Court of Human Rights, as there is no exhaustion of local remedies rule, and its human rights jurisdiction is based on the ACHPR and not the European Convention for the Protection of Human Rights and Fundamental Freedoms (ECHR).
