= Ann Itto Leonardo =

South Sudanese politician

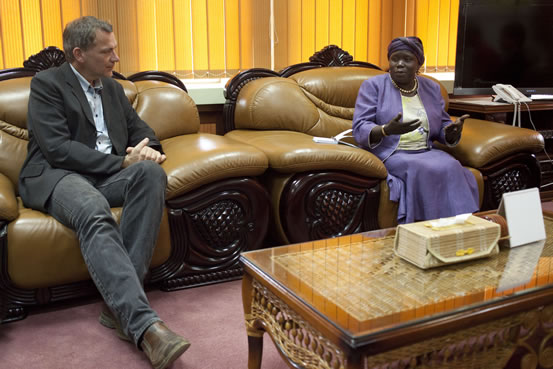
Jan van Aken in conversation with Ann Itto Leonardo

Ann Itto Leonardo is a South Sudanese politician. She was previously the Minister of Agriculture and Forestry for the South Sundanese government, as well as the acting secretary-general of the Sudan People’s Liberation Movement.

== Education career ==
In 1978, she joined the University of Juba as a teaching assistant. After receiving a scholarship, she attended Kansas State University in the United States where she studied for her doctorate. Leonardo returned to the University of Juba afterwards where she took up a lecturing post. In 1994, she joined the Sudan People’s Liberation Movement and began to pursue a career in politics.

== Political career ==
Ann Itto Leonardo was named the Minister of Agriculture and Forestry within the Cabinet of South Sudan on 10 July 2011. Prior to the referendum on self determination, she stressed the need for food security. She subsequently announced plans in late 2011 to set up a national agricultural bank, and to provide technical support to the 90 percent of the population who are involved in small-scale farming.

During 2014–15, she was named as the acting secretary-general of the SPLM. During this time she commended the work undertaken to launch a new blood bank in Wau. In November 2015, she was replaced in that position by Jemma Nunu Kumba.

She has been critical of the lack of involvement of women in the government of South Sudan in 2014, and that political progress was being undermined by the constant conflict, saying "We could lose all the gains we have made, women need to lead the change we want to see". In 2016, she was named as the advisor for agriculture and food security to South Sudanese President Salva Kiir.

== See also ==
- Sudan People's Liberation Army/Movement
