= East African Community Treaty =

1999 treaty to establish the Community

The treaty for the establishment of the East African Community was signed on 30 November 1999. It entered into force on 7 July 2000 following its ratification by the original three Partner States – Kenya, Uganda and Tanzania. Rwanda and Burundi acceded to the treaty on 18 June 2007, and became full members of the community effective 1 July 2007. The accord established the East African Community whereby all participating nations agreed to establish more cooperative commercial and political relations for their cumulative 133 million citizens.

== See also ==
- List of treaties
