= Wanjiku Muhia =

Kenyan politician

Hon. Wanjìkū Mūhìa
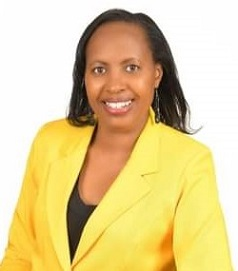

Member of Parliament - Kipipiri Constituency
- Incumbent
- Assumed office 9 August 2022
- Preceded by: Amos Kimunya
- Constituency: Kipipiri Constituency

Personal details
- Born: Nyandarua County
- Party: Jubilee Party
- Education: University of Sunderland UK; Harvard Kennedy School, USA; Kenya Methodist University; University of Nairobi.
- Profession: Politician

Wanjìkū Mūhìa is a Kenyan politician and the Current Member of Parliament for the Kipipiri Constituency, and the Chairperson of Regional Integration Committee. A member of the Jubilee Party, she previously served as a Regional Member of Parliament in the 4th East African Legislative Assembly (EALA) (2018-2022) and was the first female representative for Nyandarūa County (2013-2017).

Mūhìa is the founder of Wanjìkū Mūhìa Foundation, which works with the Nyandarūa Cancer Centre to educate people about cancer.

== Education ==
She attended Kamahia Primary School and later joined Nakuru High School where she sat for her O-Level exams. she graduated from the University of Nairobi with Diploma in Human Resources Management and from Kenya Methodist University with Bachelor in Business Administration. Mūhìa has a Master's Degree in Business Administration from University of Sunderland UK and she studied Leaders in Development: Managing Change i then a Dynamic World from Harvard Kennedy School.

She was the Regional Customer Service Manager at Equity Bank Limited (2006-2012) and the Human Resource/ Administration Manager at Florensis BV (1998-2003).

== Politics ==
Mūhìa was the women's representative for Nyandarua and current member of parliament representing Kipipiri constituency in Nyandarūa county. She was elected as an MP for the Jubilee Party in the 2013 Kenyan general election, with 158,486 votes (66.7% of all votes cast).

In December 2017, the Jubilee Party nominated Wanjiku for the East African Legislative Assembly. She secured her place on the ELEA with 180 votes.

On 9 August 2022, she was elected member of the national assembly representing the Kipipiri constituency, beating the incumbent Amos Kìmunya of the Jubilee party.

== Achievements ==
- She amended the Persons Living with Disability (PLWDs) Act of 2013. This amendment compelled all television stations in Kenya to include sign language in their news bulletins and programs of national importance.
- Hon. Wanjiku Mūhìa petitioned the government to reinstate cargo carriers on PSV (Matatu), this helped in preserving jobs for hundreds of thousands of youths in the country.
