= Gloria Laker Aciro =

Ugandan journalist and peace journalism advocate

- Born: Gulu District, Uganda
- Other name: Gloria Laker Adiiki Aciro
- Citizenship: Ugandan
- Education: Bachelor of Journalism and Mass Communication, Ndejje University
- Occupations: Journalist, media trainer
- Years active: 1990s–present
- Known for: Coverage of the Lord's Resistance Army (LRA) conflict; founder and director of the Peace Journalism Foundation of East Africa
- Awards: BBC Communicating Justice Award (2008); Golden Jubilee Medal (2019); IGAD Media Award – Gender Responsive category (2024); Luxembourg Peace Prize – Outstanding Peace Journalism (2025)

Gloria Laker Aciro also known as Gloria Laker Adiiki Aciro is a Ugandan journalist, media trainer, and advocate of peace journalism. She is the founder and director of the Peace Journalism Foundation (PJF) of East Africa. She previously worked as a reporter covering the Lord's Resistance Army (LRA) conflict in northern Uganda. She is winner of the 2024 IGAD Award and 2025 Luxembourg Peace Prize.

== Early life and education ==
Aciro was born in Gulu district and as a teenager in the 1990s, her hometown was affected by the conflict between government forces and the LRA. She began working as a journalist while still a displaced person, reporting on the LRA conflict for New Vision and Capital Radio. She later obtained a bachelor's degree in Journalism and Mass Communication from Ndejje University.

== Career ==
She founded the Peace Journalism Foundation of East Africa also referred to as the Peace Journalism Foundation or PJF, where she serves as director and media trainer and through the organization she has trained and mentored over 700 journalists across Africa in conflict-sensitive and peace-oriented approaches.

== See also ==
- Emily Maractho
- Shamim Mayanja
- Sara Mulindwa
- Sanyu Robinah Mweruka
