= Benson Turamye =

Ugandan administrator

- Citizenship: Ugandan
- Education: Makerere University
- Occupations: Administrator, procurement specialist
- Employer: Public Procurement and Disposal of Public Assets Authority
- Known for: Executive Director of the Public Procurement and Disposal of Public Assets Authority
- Title: Executive Director
- Predecessor: Cornelia Sabiiti

Benson Turamye also known as Canon Benson Turamye is a Ugandan administrator and procurement specialist who serves as the executive director of the Public Procurement and Disposal of Public Assets Authority (PPDA), Uganda's regulator for public procurement and disposal of public assets.

== Education background ==
Turamye holds a bachelor's degree in economics and a master's degree in economic policy and planning from Makerere University and he is a member of the Chartered Institute of Procurement and Supply (MCIPS).

== Career ==
Turamye began his public-service career as an economist at the Ministry of Finance, Planning and Economic Development, where he worked for six years. From there he joined PPDA and served as Manager of Procurement Audit and Investigations for six years.

He later became Director of Performance Monitoring of PPDA and after Cornelia Kakooza Sabiiti's term ended in March 2017, Turamye became Acting Executive Director in April 2017. In June 2019, the PPDA Board appointed him as the executive director of the Public Procurement and Disposal of Public Assets Authority.

== See also ==
- Cornelia Sabiiti
- Isaac Mulindwa
- Davinia Esther Anyakun
- Moses Muhwezi
