= Michael Chibita =

Ugandan supreme court justice

- Born: 30 April 1963 (age 63); Buwesa Village, Butaleja District, Uganda
- Citizenship: Uganda
- Education: Kings College Budo (High school diploma); Makerere University (LL.B.); Law Development Centre (Diploma in Legal Practice); University of Iowa (LL.M.)
- Occupations: Lawyer, judge
- Years active: 1993–present
- Known for: Law
- Title: Justice of the Supreme Court of Uganda
- Spouse: Monica Chibita

Michael Chibita is a Ugandan lawyer and judge, who serves on the Supreme Court of Uganda, effective December 2019. From 15 August 2013 until 6 December 2019, he served as the Director of Public Prosecution in Uganda. Prior to that, he served as a justice of the High Court of Uganda.

== Background and education ==
Chibita was born in Buwesa Village, Butaleja District, in the Eastern Region of Uganda on 30 April 1963, to Clement and Edisa Duallo. After attending primary school locally, he was admitted to King's College Budo, in Wakiso District, where he completed his O-Level studies and went on to complete his A-Level education, graduating with a high school diploma in 1985.

He entered Makerere University Law School, graduating in 1988 with a Bachelor of Laws degree. He followed that with a Postgraduate Diploma in Legal Practice, obtained from the Law Development Centre, in 1989. Later, he obtained a Master of Laws degree in International and Comparative Law from the University of Iowa, in the United States.

== Career ==
Chibita lectured in International Relations and African History at the University of Northwestern – St. Paul, in Roseville, Minnesota, a suburb of St. Paul in the United States, in 1993.

In 1994, he returned to Uganda and was hired as a State Attorney in the Attorney General's Chambers. He served as a legal assistant to the Attorney General of Uganda from 1995 until 1996.

He was then appointed as the Private Secretary for Legal Affairs, in the Office of the President of Uganda, serving there for seven years, from 1996 until 2003. In 2003, he returned to the Chambers of the Attorney General of Uganda for another two years. He then served as an Assistant Commissioner, in Commissioner General's Office at the Uganda Revenue Authority, until 2010.

Between 2013 and 2019 he served as the Director of Public Prosecution (DPP). In December 2019, he was appointed to the Supreme Court of Uganda.

== Family ==
Justice Mike Chibita is married to Professor Monica Chibita, the Dean of the Faculty of Journalism, Media and Communication at Uganda Christian University. Together, they are parents to five children, two daughters and three sons.

== See also ==
- Jane Kiggundu
- Susan Okalany
- Ministry of Justice and Constitutional Affairs (Uganda)
