= Cornelia Sabiiti =

Ugandan lawyer and judge

Honorable Lady Justice Cornelia Sabiiti
- Born: 1970 (age 55–56); Uganda
- Citizenship: Uganda
- Education: Makerere University (Bachelor of Laws); Law Development Centre (Diploma in Legal Practice); International Labour Organization (Postgraduate Diploma in Procurement)
- Occupations: Lawyer, judge
- Years active: 2004 — present
- Known for: Law
- Title: Justice of the High Court of Uganda

Cornelia Sabiti Kakooza, (née Cornelia Sabiiti), is a Ugandan lawyer and judge on the High Court of Uganda. She was appointed to that court by president Yoweri Museveni, on 8 February 2018.

== Background and education ==
She attended Mt. St. Mary's College Namagunga for her O-level and A-level studies. In March 1992, she graduated from the Faculty of Law of Makerere University, Uganda's largest and oldest public university, with a Bachelor of Laws. The following year, she was awarded a Diploma in Legal Practice by the Law Development Centre, in Kampala, Uganda's capital city. In January 1996, she graduated with a Master of Laws in International Law from Makerere University. She also holds a Postgraduate Diploma in Procurement, obtained from the International Labour Organization, at its training facility in Turin, Italy.

== Career ==
In her early years, Ms Sabiiti worked as a State Attorney in the Office of the Attorney General. Thereafter she worked as a Legal Counsel at the National Environment Management Authority (NEMA). She then served as Manager Legal and Compliance at the Public Procurement and Disposal of Public Assets Authority (PPDA), for a period of seven years. She was then appointed as the Company Secretary and Director of Legal and Compliance at the PPDA. In March 2011, she was appointed to a six-year renewable term as the Executive Director to the PPDA, government agency. While there, she spearheaded government procurement reforms, where in all government contracts, at least 30 percent of the work, or 30 percent of sourced supplies are reserved for local firms or suppliers. In 2017, Sabiiti opted not to renew her tenure at the PPDA, going back to her private practice instead.

In 2018, Cornelia Sabiiti was appointed to the High Court, and was assigned to the Land Division of that court. In 2021, Cornelia Sabiiti was assigned to the Commercial Court, a Division of the High Court.

== See also ==
- Monica Mugenyi
- Joyce Kavuma
- Lydia Mugambe
- Ministry of Justice and Constitutional Affairs (Uganda)
