= 2007 Nigerian Senate elections in Plateau State =

The 2007 Nigerian Senate election in Plateau State was held on 21 April 2007, to elect members of the Nigerian Senate to represent Plateau State. Satty Davies Gogwim representing Plateau Central, John Nanzip Shagaya representing Plateau South and Gyang Dalyop Datong representing Plateau North all won on the platform of the People's Democratic Party.

== Overview ==
Affiliation	Party		Total
Affiliation	ANPP	PDP	Total
Before Election	0	3	3
After Election	0	3	3

== Summary ==
District	Incumbent	Party	Elected Senator	Party
Plateau Central	Ibrahim Mantu	PDP	Satty Davies Gogwim	PDP
Taraba South	Silas Janfa	PDP	John Nanzip Shagaya	PDP
Taraba North	Davou Zang	PDP	Gyang Dalyop Datong	PDP

== Results ==
=== Plateau Central ===
The election was won by Satty Davies Gogwim of the Peoples Democratic Party (Nigeria).

2007 Nigerian Senate election in Plateau State
Party	Candidate	Votes	%
PDP	Satty Davies Gogwim		
Total votes			
PDP hold			

=== Plateau South ===
The election was won by John Nanzip Shagaya of the Peoples Democratic Party (Nigeria).

2007 Nigerian Senate election in Plateau State
Party	Candidate	Votes	%
PDP	John Nanzip Shagaya		
Total votes			
PDP hold			

=== Plateau North ===
The election was won by Gyang Dalyop Datong of the Peoples Democratic Party (Nigeria).

2007 Nigerian Senate election in Plateau State
Party	Candidate	Votes	%
PDP	Gyang Dalyop Datong		
Total votes			
PDP hold			
