= 2026 Ggaba daycare stabbing =

Mass stabbing in Uganda

- Location: Ggaba Early Childhood Development Program school Ggaba, Kampala, Uganda
- Date: 2 April 2026 c. 11:00 a.m. (EAT)
- Target: Children
- Attack type: Mass stabbing, child murder
- Weapon: Kitchen knife
- Deaths: 4
- Perpetrator: Christopher Okello Onyum
- Motive: Human sacrifice to gain money
- Convictions: Murder x4
- Judge: Alice Komuhangi Khaukha

On 2 April 2026, a mass stabbing took place at the Ggaba Early Childhood Development Program School in Ggaba, Kampala, Uganda. Four children were killed before the perpetrator, 38-year-old Christopher Okello Onyum, was apprehended by four bystanders who responded to the scene.

Okello had confessed to the murders of the four children, which he believed that it would act as a "human sacrifice" to gain money. He was sentenced to death within four weeks of the stabbings.

== Stabbing ==
The perpetrator entered the school building following an agreed meeting to pay the admission fee for a child he was sponsoring. At 11:09 a.m., after paying 195,000 shilling to the administrator via mobile transaction, the perpetrator then stepped outside, locked the gate and attacked children in the yard using a kitchen knife. At the time, 44 of the 48 enrolled children were present in the building. During the attack, which lasted seven minutes, caretaker Annet Odong confronted the perpetrator, believing he was beating one of the children. Odong was charged by the perpetrator, but not injured as secretary Phoebe Namutebi hit him with a bicycle as he was running. Namutebi was threatened with death by the perpetrator.

Four men, workers Cyrus Bukenya, Bashir Matovu, and a man named Timothy, as well as Moses Opio, the latter a security guard of the nearby Ggaba Community Church, apprehended the perpetrator at the school gate and locked him inside Opio's personal room at the church. The perpetrator had already thrown away the murder weapon as he was subdued. Two additional knives, hidden in socks, were either recovered by the four passersby during the initial struggle or fell out as responding officers led him away to a police vehicle. A local woman, identified as Aunt Harriet, drove three of the victims to Wentz Medical Centre. Locals attempted to lynch the perpetrator, but were prevented by local authorities who fired warning shots into the air and detained the perpetrator. A fire was set in protest to police actions.

== Victims ==
The victims were identified as three boys and a girl, with ages ranging from 15 months to two and a half years old. One victim died at the scene while three others were declared dead at the hospital. All of them died of hypovolemic shock from severe stab and cutting wounds to the right side of the neck. The victims were:

- Gideon Eteku, male, aged 2½
- Keisha Alungati (also known as Keisha Agenorwoth Otim), female, aged 2
- Ignatius Sseruyange, male, aged 2½
- Ryan Odeke, male, aged 1½

== Perpetrator ==
A few hours after the attack, Kampala Metropolitan spokesperson Racheal Kawala identified 38-year-old Christopher Okello Onyum as the suspect, though his name was initially misreported as "Okello Christopher Onyu" and his age misstated as 34. He was a resident of Katumba Village in Kyanja and holds both Ugandan and American citizenship. Okello was jailed at Luzira prison until trial.

Okello was born on 23 June 1987 in Kitwe, Zambia, to Ugandan expatriate parents. His father, from Kwania District, worked in Zambia as an accountant for PwC while his mother, from Kumi District, had joined her husband from their main home in Kampala a year prior. Okello spent the first ten years of his life in Lusaka, where he attended primary school, moving back to Uganda in 1997. He completed primary education, but during his secondary education, he had to transfer from Aga Khan Secondary School to Ggaba Parents Secondary School due to financial constraints. In 2003, the family relocated to the United States for work, where Okello first attended pharmacy courses before switching to taxation work. He returned to Uganda in 2016, by which point relatives in Kampala noted that his behaviour had changed, with a short stay at the Butabika National Referral Hospital in December 2020.

Some years before 2025, Okello moved out of the family home to live by himself in a rented house. He lived briefly with his mother again for a few weeks before leaving again, despite his relatives pleading for him to stay. His last known employment was as a commuting farm worker in Nwoya District for an American company between September 2025 and February 2026. By this point, Okello had mostly cut contact with his family, with his mother visiting his house on 26 March 2026, less than a week before the murders, only to be told that her son was not at home.

== Investigation ==
In a reconstruction, Okello was determined to have rented a Toyota Rav4 on 31 March to travel to Ggaba. On 1 April, he met with a school caretaker, claiming he wanted to enroll a three-year-old girl on behalf of the girl's mother and scheduling a meeting for the following day with the administrative head. Due to this, prosecutors established premeditation of the child murders.

On 3 April, Kampala Police searched Okello's residence, recovering "two American passports in his name, two mobile phones, two laptops, a psychiatric report, an American driving permit, and a Certificate of Good Conduct". At his arrest, diclofenac tablets were found on Okello's person. On 7 April, Okello stated during a psychological exam that his motive was to kill the children as a human sacrifice to obtain wealth, which he had learnt of through stories as a child. He also told the doctor, Deputy Director of Police Health Services Emmanuel Nuwamaya, that he tried to kill himself in 2023, that he had a history of visual hallucinations between 2016 and 2025, and that he had already killed a three-year-old boy between 2016 and 2017 to "save him from the troubles of the world". The attending doctor, while acknowledging Okello's supernatural belief in human sacrifice, did not find any other signs for mental abnormalities. In addition, the psychiatric report at his home, issued by C-Care IHK, certified Okello as mentally fit. The American embassy also confirmed that there was no medical record for psychiatric illness or criminal record in Okello's name.

Okello's internet history included searches for schools in his vicinity, with specific searches by name for institutions ranging from kindergartens to junior schools, gun licence requirements in Uganda, and beheading videos by the Islamic State, as well as a download of a copy of The Art of War, which were later presented as evidence for Okello's plans.

On 6 April, during the funeral of Supreme Justice Augustine Nshimye, President Yoweri Museveni announced through Director of Public Prosecutions Jane Frances Abodo that the trial would be prioritised and further set to take place within Ggaba through a mobile court outside of typical courthouses, citing the nature of the trial as a "public interests case" and reasoning that with the local location "residents can witness justice being dispensed". The mobile court judicial framework had been introduced a few weeks earlier on 19 March, making the trial one of the first recent criminal cases to be processed in this manner. Previously, Chief of Uganda People's Defence Force Muhoozi Kainerugaba voiced the opinion that the trial should occur before General Court Martial due to the severity of the crime and Okello's prior criminal record.

On 8 April, Okello appeared before the Makindye Chief Magistrate’s Court, where the Director of Public Prosecutions (DPP) publicly announced Okello's confessed motive of attaining wealth through human sacrifice. Okello was subsequently ordered to face trial through the High Court.

On 11 April, Okello was also accused of the murder of his 15-month-old stepbrother Martin Freeman Kaaya, who died of asphyxia on 27 December 2018. Based on the accusations, police reopened the case on 13 April. It was noted that Okello travelled back to the United States shortly after Freeman's death. Prosecutors believed that Okello had been referring to Freeman in his earlier confession about previously killing a child.

== Trial and sentencing ==
The trial took place at Ggaba Community Church, near the attack site. Okello faced four counts of murder, entering a not guilty plea on 13 April. Prosecutors at a court hearing allegedly said Okello had confessed to the murders of the four children, which he believed that it would act as a "human sacrifice" to gain money. The trial was handled by the International Crimes Division of the High Court of Uganda, presided over by Justice Alice Komuhangi Khaukha.

=== Prosecution and defense arguments ===
The prosecution presented forensic evidence and eyewitness testimony from daycare staff, describing the attack as a premeditated act of extreme violence against defenseless children. The state argued that the gravity of the crime—specifically the targeting of toddlers—warranted the maximum penalty under Ugandan law.

Okello's defense team primarily relied on a plea of insanity. They argued that Okello was suffering from a severe mental breakdown at the time of the killings. However, psychiatric evaluations ordered by the court concluded that Okello was legally sane and fit to stand trial, noting that his actions showed a level of planning and awareness.

On 24 April, Okello made a statement in his own defense, claiming he was being pressured into giving money to several people. He said that before the murders, he tried to leave Uganda, but later planned a bank robbery and to kill his brother's family. He acknowledged killing the four children as accused, but argued that he did not do so intentionally and was instead "coerced", saying he was "unlikely [to] do anything like this" as he was considered by others to be "of generally good moral character, busy and focused and resourceful".

=== Conviction and sentencing ===
On 30 April 2026, Justice Khaukha delivered a judgment rejecting the insanity defense, ruling that the prosecution had proved "malice aforethought" beyond a reasonable doubt. In her sentencing remarks, Khaukha described the murders as "chilling, heartless, and an affront to the sanctity of life," noting that the vulnerability of the victims was a significant aggravating factor.

Okello was sentenced to death by hanging for each of the four counts of murder. This marked a high-profile application of the death penalty since the Susan Kigula ruling of 2009, which rendered the sentence discretionary. Under the precedent set by Kigula & Ors v Attorney General, if Okello is not executed within three years of exhausting his appeals, the sentence must be commuted to life imprisonment. Following the verdict, Okello's legal team filed a notice of appeal with the Court of Appeal of Uganda.

The Uganda Law Society (ULS) criticised the trial for its quick and public nature, saying it violated the constitution and describing it as "a judicial lynching rally". Throughout the legal proceedings, ULS denounced Okello's court-appointed attorneys for "failing in their professional duty to safeguard the rights of their client", with ULS representatives having been escorted from the court while attempting to present a human rights enforcement application to the judge.

== Aftermath ==
A memorial service for the four murdered children was held at Ggaba Community Church on 6 April, coinciding with Easter Monday service, both held by Archbishop of Uganda Stephen Kaziimba. The prior day, during an Easter Sunday service, President Museveni had ordered the allocation of ten million shillings for the four affected victim families, with the donation taking place during the memorial through State Minister for Youth and Children's Affairs Balaam Barugahara.

Ggaba Early Childhood Development Program School, as well as two related schools (Maranatha High School and Maranatha Christian Primary School) have remained closed since the attack at the order of Minister of Education and Sports John Chrysestom Muyingo on 3 April, with pending relocation of the main school as of August 2026. The original building is slated for demolition for the construction of a memorial to the victims.

== See also ==
- List of mass stabbing incidents (2020–present)
