= Flavia Anglin Senoga =

Ugandan lawyer and judge

Flavia Anglin Senoga, also Flavia Senoga Anglin, is a Ugandan lawyer and judge on the High Court of Uganda. She was appointed to that court by president Yoweri Museveni, on 14 March 2011.

== Background and education ==
She graduated from the Faculty of Law of Makerere University, Uganda's largest and oldest public university, with a Bachelor of Laws, circa 1973. The following year, she was awarded a Diploma in Legal Practice by the Law Development Centre, in Kampala, Uganda's capital city.

== Career ==
Prior to her ascension to the bench, Ms Senoga was the Chief Registrar at the High Court of Uganda, the first woman to serve in that capacity. She had started out as a Grade I magistrate, prior to that.

At the High Court, she was assigned to different divisions until she was appointed as the Deputy Head of the Criminal Division. Before the criminal division, Justice Senoga served in the Executions and Bailiffs Division of the High Court, as the Deputy Head. She was transferred to the Criminal Division in June 2017.

Among the cases that she has presided over, is State vs Muhammad Ssebuufu et al., also referred to as the "Pine Murder Case", where a car salesman and others are accused of kidnapping a customer and beating her to death, on account of failure to settle a USh9 million (US$2,500) debt.

== Other considerations ==
Justice Flavia Anglin Senoga is a member of the board of directors of the Agency for Accelerated Regional Development (AFARD), non-profit, organization that aims to improve the living conditions of the people of the West Nile sub-region.

== See also ==
- Monica Mugenyi
- Jane Kiggundu
- Lydia Mugambe
- Ministry of Justice and Constitutional Affairs (Uganda)
