= Anna Bitature Mugenyi =

Ugandan lawyer and judge

Honorable Anna Bitature Mugenyi

Justice of the High Court of Uganda
- Incumbent
- Assumed office 9 May 2016

Personal details
- Born: Uganda
- Education: Makerere University (Bachelor of Laws); Law Development Centre (Diploma in Legal Practice); Eastern and Southern African Management Institute (Master of Business Administration)
- Occupation: Judge
- Profession: Legal

Anna Bitature Mugenyi (née Anna Bitature), is a Ugandan justice of the High Court of Uganda, since May 2016.

== Background and education ==
She was born and educated in Uganda for her elementary schooling. She earned her High School Diploma at Mount Saint Mary's College Namagunga, a prestigious all-girls boarding high school in present-day Mukono District.

She earned a Bachelor of Laws (LLB) degree from Makerere University, the nation's oldest and largest public University. In 1993, she also obtained a Diploma in Legal Practice, from the Law Development Centre, in Kampala, the country's capital city and was admitted to the Uganda Bar, as a practicing lawyer. Later, she earned a Master of Business Administration from the Eastern and Southern African Management Institute.

== Career ==
Justice Bitature's expertise is in commercial law and tax administration. She served as Assistant Commissioner at the headquarters of the Uganda People's Defence Forces (UPDF), based at its headquarters in Mbuya. She was then hired by the Uganda Revenue Authority (URA), working there as Assistant Commissioner, until she was appointed to the High Court of Uganda, as a judge. She is assigned to the Commercial Division of the High Court.

== See also ==
- Lydia Mugambe
- Elizabeth Kabanda
- Flavia Anglin Senoga
