= Nigerian senators of the 6th National Assembly =

Senators of the 6th National Assembly of Nigeria

The table below lists Nigerian senators of the 6th National Assembly. The 6th National Assembly (2007–2011) was inaugurated on 5 June 2007. The Senate includes three senators from each of the 36 states, plus one minister for the Federal Capital Territory, Abuja. Of the 109 Senators, 26 were re-elected while 83 were elected for the first time. David Mark was appointed president of the Senate and Ike Ekweremadu deputy president.

== Election results by party ==
Party	Seats
People's Democratic Party	262
All Nigeria Peoples Party	62
Action Congress	32
Progressive Peoples Alliance	3
Labour Party	1
Accord	0
Total	360
Source: IPU

== See also ==
- Nigerian Senate
