= Capital punishment in Uganda =

Capital punishment is a legal penalty in Uganda. The death penalty was likely last carried out in 1999, although some sources say the last execution in Uganda took place in 2005. Regardless, Uganda is interchangeably considered a retentionist state with regard to capital punishment, due to absence of "an established practice or policy against carrying out executions," as well as a de facto abolitionist state due to the lack of any executions for over one decade.

Uganda has taken recent steps towards abolition, such as several measures to abolish the mandatory death penalty; however, they have also taken recent steps towards expanding the death penalty, such as their 2023 bill prescribing the death penalty for 'aggravated homosexuality.'

== Methods and statutes ==
A 1965 report on worldwide death penalty usage reported that Uganda only implemented the death penalty for murder, treason, and espionage, and that Uganda's exclusive method of execution was hanging. In 2023, Uganda's methods of execution were hanging and shooting.

== History and recent developments ==
Uganda's first recorded execution took place in 1917.

=== Most recent executions and developments ===
From 1996 to 1999, Uganda experienced an unofficial moratorium and "effective ban" on executions, although this was reversed with the execution of several death row inmates in April 1999. In late April 1999, Amnesty International identified 28 men who were at risk of being imminently executed on 30 April 1999 at 7:30 pm, in Luzira Maximum Security Prison in the capital city of Kampala. Twenty-six of the inmates had been convicted of murder, while two inmates were convicted of aggravated robbery. One of the 28 men was Haji Musa Sebirumbi, a former National Security Agent and official formerly affiliated with the Uganda People's Congress, who had been on death row since his 1989 conviction of five murders he committed in 1981, and the loss of his appeal in June 1992, while Amnesty was not able to identify details about the other impending executions. Amnesty did identify thirteen separate death row inmates who Uganda's Advisory Committee on the Prerogative of Mercy spared by commuting their death sentences to life imprisonment. Despite Amnesty International's appeals to Ugandan President Yoweri Museveni on behalf of the 28 condemned inmates, all 28 inmates were executed by hanging as scheduled, with the executions taking place "in phases" of several inmates at a time. The executions drew condemnation from the European Union and the United Kingdom.

Several sources state that the 28 civilian hangings in April 1999 were the most recent executions to take place in Uganda. Other sources state that Uganda's last execution took place in 2005 and that Uganda was one of only four nations in Africa (out of 53 total) to carry out any executions in 2005, the others being Libya, Somalia, and Sudan. The 2005 execution was supposedly carried out for military crimes, as opposed to the 1999 executions, which were for civilian crimes.

In 2018, President Museveni posted to Twitter to indicate his intention to revive the death penalty and sign death warrants in an attempt to address increasing crime rates, particularly in Kampala. Museveni stated that his hesitation to sign death warrants came from his "Christian background ... but being lenient is causing people to think they can cause harm and get away with it. I will revise my position." Critics of Museveni's government accused Museveni of using the proposed return of the death penalty to threaten his political opponents rather than to address rising crime rates, as well as using discussion about reviving capital punishment to distract from a new constitutional amendment that would permit him to rule "for life" by eliminating the preexisting age limit prohibiting a Ugandan president from serving past the age of 75.

In 1999, at the time of the hangings on 30 April, there were over 1,000 death row inmates in Uganda. In 2012, there were an estimated 6,000 inmates on remand awaiting trial on capital charges that potentially carried the death penalty. Despite Uganda's lack of executions since 2005, in 2017, there were still over 250 inmates on Uganda's death row. By 2019, the number had decreased to 133, although by 2023, the number of death row inmates in Uganda had slightly increased to 145.

=== 2002–2009: Susan Kigula case, and the abolition of Uganda's death penalty ===
The case of Susan Kigula was instrumental in leading to Uganda's abolition of the mandatory death penalty for murder. In 2002, Kigula and her housekeeper, Patience Nansamba, were convicted of the murder of Kigula's husband; both were sentenced to death, as at the time, Uganda's capital punishment statutes prescribed a mandatory death sentence in murder cases. Kigula's attorneys joined with anti-death penalty activists active in challenging the death penalty in Africa and the Caribbean region in using Kigula's case to challenge Uganda's mandatory death penalty laws. At the time Kigula was selected to be the lead applicant for an appeal challenging Uganda's mandatory death penalty, there were 417 total inmates on Uganda's death row, although by 2009, this number had grown to approximately 900.

The challenge Kigula and her attorneys presented on behalf of all Ugandan death row inmates proved successful; in 2005, Uganda's Constitutional Court abolished the mandatory death penalty for murder, finding it to be a "violation of fundamental human rights" and putting an inmate's right to a fair trial in jeopardy due to eliminating the opportunity for mitigation in sentencing, and requiring the Ugandan government to re-sentence every inmate on death row. The Constitutional Court simultaneously announced that any Ugandan inmates who had been condemned to die for longer than three years without having their death sentence carried out were entitled to a commutation of their sentence due to the mental suffering lengthy delays could cause to condemned inmates. These decisions were both affirmed by the Supreme Court of Uganda on 21 January 2009. However, while Uganda's mandatory death penalty law for murder cases was again held to be unconstitutional, the Supreme Court of Uganda upheld the constitutionality of the death penalty as a whole and declared that hanging was not a cruel and unusual method of execution and was thus still constitutional.

Uganda's High Court reevaluated Kigula's own death sentence in 2011; for the first time since the abolition of the mandatory death penalty, the High Court was permitted to consider holistic views of capital defendants' characters and took Kigula's good behaviour behind bars and lack of prior record into consideration. Uganda's High Court ultimately commuted Kigula's sentence to 20 years' imprisonment. Kigula's housekeeper Nansamba had her sentence commuted to 16 years' imprisonment. Kigula was released from prison in 2016 after being given credit for time served.

==== Additional mandatory death penalty abolition ====
In 2019, the Parliament of Uganda passed a law abolishing the mandatory death penalty for additional crimes. The Kigula case led to the abolition of mandatory capital punishment for murder, while the Ugandan Parliament passed an additional law to prohibit the mandatory death penalty under the Ugandan Anti-Terrorism Act. The new law restricted the death penalty so it would only be applied at a judge's discretion. Ugandan legislators saw the 2019 law as a gesture towards undermining and abolishing capital punishment entirely, while the Ugandan Prisons Service commended the law for promoting the prison system's goal of rehabilitating inmates.

=== 2023: Anti-Homosexuality Bill ===
In 2023, the Parliament of Uganda passed the Anti-Homosexuality Bill, 2023, which among other restrictions against LGBT people, prescribes the death penalty for 'aggravated homosexuality.' The law took effect in June 2023. In August 2023, two Ugandan men located in the city of Soroti – 20-year-old Michael Opolot and an unnamed 41-year-old man – were at risk of becoming the first to receive the death penalty under Uganda's new anti-homosexuality statutes. Opolot's trial date was projected to be over three years from the time of his arrest due to the higher stakes involved in capital prosecutions in Uganda. At the same time of Opolot's arrest, a Ugandan lawyer identified another case of a female massage parlor operator charged with homosexuality and "promotion of homosexuality." Attorney and activist Frank Mugisha criticized Uganda's anti-homosexuality law as promoting a "witch hunt" for LGBTQ people in Uganda.

=== 2026: Gaba murder trials ===
On April 30, 2026, Christopher Okello Onyum was sentenced to the death penalty for four counts of murder of young children at a day care centre in Ggaba on April 2 of the same year. Okello had been apprehended at the scene covered in the victims' blood. Okello was found guilty during a special mobile trial spanning a few weeks near the site of the killings in Ggaba. The special trial began 11 days after the murders had taken place among great public outcry for justice. Okello has appealed his sentence, citing three objections one of them being that the court did not properly evaluate his mental status and defence of insanity. Okello never denied the killings themselves.

== See also ==
- Susan Kigula, a Ugandan former death row inmate whose case led to the abolition of the mandatory death penalty in Uganda
