= 2015 Nigerian Senate elections in Enugu State =

2015 Nigerian Senate election in Enugu State

The 2015 Nigerian Senate election in Enugu State was held on March 28, 2015, to elect members of the Nigerian Senate to represent Enugu State. Gilbert Nnaji representing Enugu East, Ike Ekweremadu representing Enugu West and Utazi Chukwuka representing Enugu North all won on the platform of Peoples Democratic Party.

== Overview ==
Affiliation	Party		Total
Affiliation	PDP	APC	Total
Before Election			3
After Election	3	–	3

== Summary ==
District	Incumbent	Party	Elected Senator	Party
Enugu East			Gilbert Nnaji	PDP
Enugu West			Ike Ekweremadu	PDP
Enugu North			Utazi Chukwuka	PDP

== Results ==
=== Enugu East ===
Peoples Democratic Party candidate Gilbert Nnaji won the election, defeating All Progressives Congress candidate Benjamin Nwoye and other party candidates.

2015 Nigerian Senate election in Enugu State
Party	Candidate	Votes	%
PDP	Gilbert Nnaji		
APC	Benjamin Nwoye		
Total votes			
PDP hold			

=== Enugu West ===
Peoples Democratic Party candidate Ike Ekweremadu won the election, defeating All Progressives Congress candidate Achieze Louisa and other party candidates.

2015 Nigerian Senate election in Enugu State
Party	Candidate	Votes	%
PDP	Ike Ekweremadu		
APC	Achieze Louisa		
Total votes			
PDP hold			

=== Enugu North ===
Peoples Democratic Party candidate Utazi Chukwuka won the election, defeating All Progressives Congress candidate Joseph Okoloagu and other party candidates.

2015 Nigerian Senate election in Enugu State
Party	Candidate	Votes	%
PDP	Utazi Chukwuka		
APC	Joseph Okoloagu		
Total votes			
PDP hold			
