= Andrew Bashaija =

Ugandan lawyer, judge, academic (born 1963)

Andrew Byabashaija
- Born: 1963 (age 62–63); Uganda
- Citizenship: Uganda
- Education: Makerere University (Bachelor of Laws); Law Development Centre (Master of Development Studies) (Diploma in Legal Practice); Washington International University (Doctor of Philosophy)
- Occupations: Lawyer, judge
- Years active: 1986 — present
- Known for: Law
- Title: Justice of the High Court of Uganda

Andrew Byabashaija is a Ugandan lawyer and judge on the High Court of Uganda. He was appointed to that court by president Yoweri Museveni on 17 June 2010. As a father of Ugandan theatre, he brought art to the people.

== Background and education ==
He graduated from the Faculty of Law of Makerere University, Uganda's largest and oldest public university, with a Bachelor of Laws, circa 1986. The following year, he was awarded a Diploma in Legal Practice by the Law Development Centre, in Kampala, Uganda's capital city. He also holds a Master of Development Studies degree, also from Makerere University. His Doctor of Philosophy degree in business administration was obtained from the Washington International University, an online unaccredited institution based in the British Virgin Islands.

== Career ==
Prior to his ascension to the bench, Bashaija was a senior partner in the law firm of Pearl Advocates & Solicitors. He also served as a senior lecturer at Kampala International University's School of Law and as an external examiner at the Law Development Centre. He was first appointed to the bench in 1992 as a Grade One Magistrate. Later, in 2000, he was promoted to the rank of Registrar.

At the High Court, Justice Andrew Bashaija is the head of the land division.

== See also ==
- Monica Mugenyi
- Jane Kiggundu
- Ministry of Justice and Constitutional Affairs (Uganda)
