= Uganda Media Women's Association =

Ugandan non-governmental organization

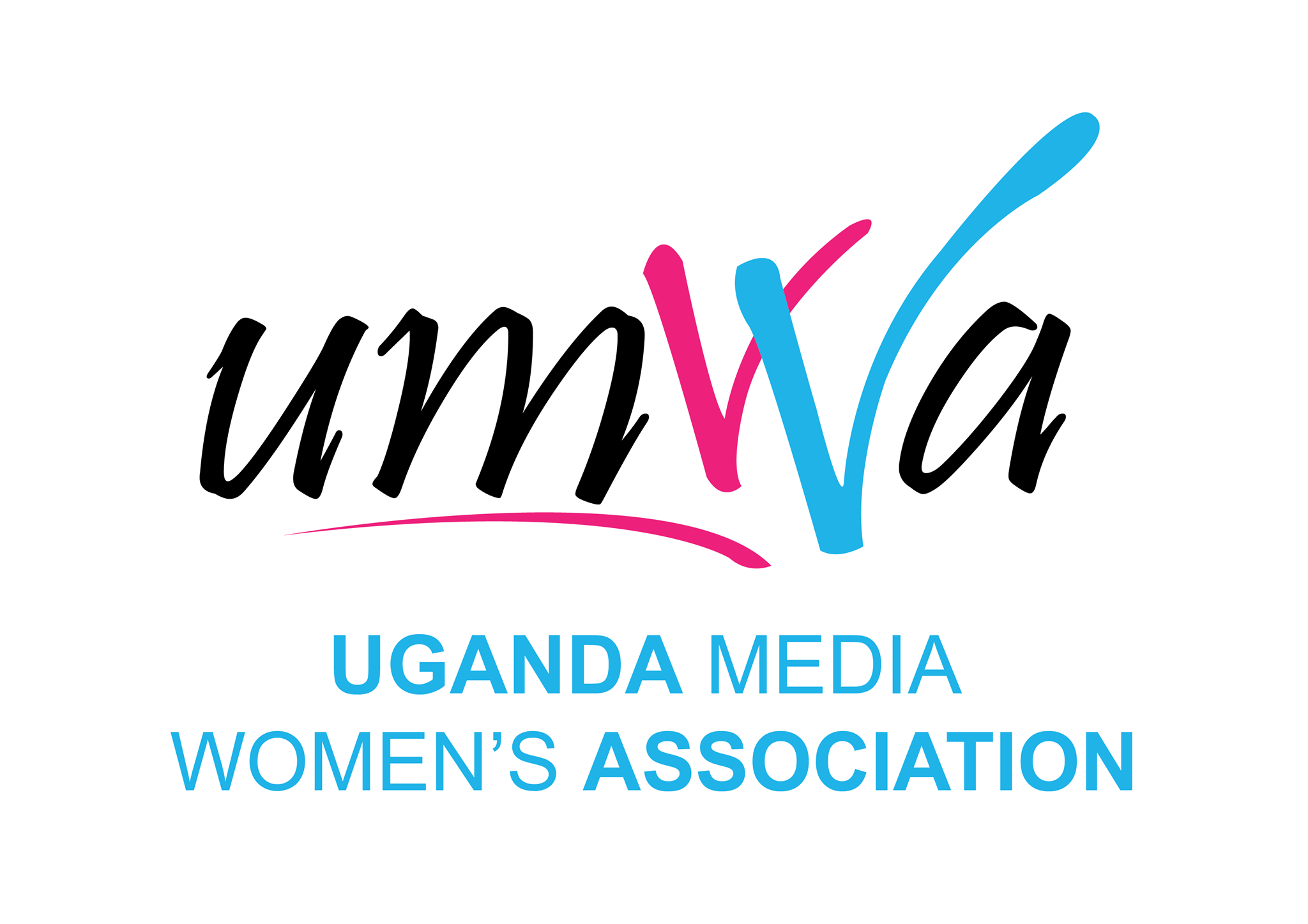
- Abbreviation: UMWA
- Formation: 1983
- Type: NGO
- Legal status: Organization
- Purpose: Gender equality and Social Justice
- Headquarters: Kampala, Uganda
- Location: Kampala, Uganda
- Region served: Uganda, Rwanda, Tanzania and Kenya
- Official language: English
- Executive Director: Margaret Sentamu Masagazi
- Main organ: Board of Directors
- Website: Official website

The Uganda Media Women's Association (UMWA) - is a nonprofit non-governmental organization located in Kampala, Uganda, focused on human rights advocacy and women's rights.

== History ==
The Uganda Media Women's Association (UMWA) was formed in 1983 by female journalists as a membership association to bring about media of Gender equality and Social Justice. These female journalists offer themselves to bringing women's issues into the forefront through broadcasts (radio, TV and print media) on a variety of topics, including early pregnancy, violence against women, among other issues. UMWA runs a women owned community radio station called https://www.umwamamafm.co.ug/mama-101-7-fm/ on frequency 101.7, their slogan is The Voice To Listen To. Mama FM is officially 25 years old as of Monday 24th August 2026.

== Programs and Activities ==
UMWA runs a media house, Mama FM which is a community development women focused radio operating in Kampala and the greater Central Region of Uganda. The radio publishes live edutainment programs, features, live talk shows, music and news. Mama FM was founded in 2001 as the first women radio to serve women and marginalized people.

Uganda Media Women's Association has been at the forefront in organising Gender Media Awards in which journalists and media houses that have excelled in gender sensitive reporting.

UMWA aims to raise the status of Uganda's women, especially those in rural communities, so that they are involved and can freely participate in development programmes that are designed to not only benefit them but the country at large.

UMWA partners with World Association for Christian Communication (WACC), Code for Africa and UN Women on the Global Media Monitoring Project (GMMP) which is the world’s longest-running and most extensive research on gender in the news media.

UMWA has taken part in publishing papers and documents that bring out the women issues. One of the papers is the survey on Media coverage of the 2021 General Elections in which it was established that election coverage was highly skewed against women (candidates, voters, electoral officials) to the benefit of men in terms of visibility, portrayal and representation.

UMWA has been at the forefront in fighting for the rights of women journalists. A case in point is minister without Portfolio Abraham Byandala who was wanted punished after having been captured on camera on 23 March 2016 punching Judith Naluggwa in the lower abdomen as she took photos of him at the Anti-Corruption Court. Mr Byandala had appeared in court in connection with the Shs24 billion Mukono-Katosi road scandal in which he is implicated.

== Leadership ==
At the helm of UMWA is Ms Margaret B. Sentamu who has been an executive director of the organisation since 1994. The board of directors, which has seven members, is elected from the General Assembly. The Board provides an oversight role to implement and execute policies, fundraise, recruit key staff, approve annual plans and budgets, and advice the Secretariat as needed.

Current Board Members of UMWA
| | Name | Position | Description |
|---|---|---|---|
| 1 | Dr. Patricia Litho (phD) | Chairperson | A lecturer at Makerere University and works as Head Communication for Community Outreach Rural Electrification Agency |
| 2 | Dr. Emily Maractho (phD) | Vice Chairperson | Lecturer of Journalism and Media Studies at Uganda Christian University. |
| 3 | Catherine Ageno | General Secretary | News Editor at Monitor Publications Limited. |
| 4 | Dorothy Nanyonga | Treasurer | Communication Specialist at Ministry of Education and Sports (Uganda). |
| 5 | Beatrice Birungi | Member | Freelance Journalist/ Media and Communication |
| 6 | Sylivia Nalukwago | Member | |

== Awards ==
UMWA has received numerous awards that include among others an award for its outstanding contribution to media development and for creating a platform for women journalists to thrive in the World Press Freedom Day, 2022

== See Also ==
- https://www.radiocomnetu.org/nakasekeradiofm/
- https://www.fokuskvinner.no/about-fokus/
