= 2003 Nigerian Senate elections in Plateau State =

2003 Nigerian Senate election in Plateau State

The 2003 Nigerian Senate election in Plateau State was held on April 12, 2003, to elect members of the Nigerian Senate to represent Plateau State. Cosmas Niagwan representing Plateau South and Ibrahim Mantu representing Plateau Central won on the platform of Peoples Democratic Party, while Timothy Adudu representing Plateau North won on the platform of the All Nigeria Peoples Party.

== Overview ==
Affiliation	Party		Total
Affiliation	PDP	ANPP	Total
Before Election			3
After Election	2	1	3

== Summary ==
District	Incumbent	Party	Elected Senator	Party
Plateau South			Cosmas Niagwan	PDP
Plateau Central			Ibrahim Mantu	PDP
Plateau North			Timothy Adudu	ANPP

== Results ==
=== Plateau South ===
The election was won by Cosmas Niagwan of the Peoples Democratic Party.

2003 Nigerian Senate election in Plateau State
Party	Candidate	Votes	%
PDP	Cosmas Niagwan		
Total votes			
PDP hold			

=== Plateau Central ===
The election was won by Ibrahim Mantu of the Peoples Democratic Party.

2003 Nigerian Senate election in Plateau State
Party	Candidate	Votes	%
PDP	Ibrahim Mantu		
Total votes			
PDP hold			

=== Plateau North ===
The election was won by Timothy Adudu of the All Nigeria Peoples Party.

2003 Nigerian Senate election in Plateau State
Party	Candidate	Votes	%
ANPP	Timothy Adudu		
Total votes			
ANPP hold			
