= Paul Mugamba =

Ugandan lawyer and judge

- Born: Uganda
- Citizenship: Uganda
- Education: Makerere University (Bachelor of Laws); Law Development Centre (Diploma in Legal Practice)
- Occupations: Lawyer, judge
- Known for: Law
- Title: Justice of the Supreme Court of Uganda

Paul Kahaibale Mugamba is a Ugandan lawyer and judge who has been serving as a member of the Supreme Court of Uganda since September 2017. Immediately prior to his appointment to the Supreme Court, he served as a Justice of the Uganda Court of Appeal.

== See also ==
- Judiciary of Uganda
- Galdino Moro Okello
- Monica Mugenyi
- Ezekiel Muhanguzi
