= Isaac Mulindwa Jr. =

Ugandan businessman and entrepreneur (born 1965)

- Born: 1965 (age 60–61); Mbarara, Uganda
- Citizenship: Uganda
- Education: Richmond University (Bachelor of Arts in accounting and finance); Miami Dade Community College (Certificate in General Construction and Civil Engineering)
- Occupation: Businessman
- Years active: 1986 — present
- Known for: Wealth
- Spouse: Hamida kibirige Mulindwa
- Family: Sharifa, Tara, Kayla & Anila Mulindwa - daughters

Isaac Mulindwa Jr. is a businessman and entrepreneur in Uganda. In 2007, the New Vision newspaper reported him to be one of the wealthiest individuals in Uganda.

== Background and education ==
He was born circa 1965 to Isaac Mulindwa, a businessman, and Safina Nakku Mulindwa, a homemaker, in Mbarara, the second-born among ten siblings. He attended Matale Primary School in Uganda, then the Grange in Nairobi. In 1982, he went to England where he did his A-Level at Kensington School. He attended Richmond University in the United States, graduating with a degree in finance and accounting. Later, he obtained a certificate in general construction and civil engineering from Miami Dade Community College.

== Businesses and investments ==
His businesses include but are not limited to the following:

1. Shareholding in Radio Simba FM
2. Shareholding in Hot 100 FM
3. Shareholding in Club Silk, a nightclub in Bugolobi
4. Shareholding in Liquid Silk, a restaurant in (Bugoloobi)
5. Shareholding in Selas Ltd, a Marketing Firm
6. Mulin Group of companies (Ufit Micro Finance, Moma International, Mulindwa Plantations and Mullens Services)
7. Mullens Services Inc., a construction company based in Miami, Florida, USA.
8. One2net, an Internet services provider in Uganda.
