= PPDA =

PPDA may refer to:

== People ==
- Patrick Poivre d'Arvor, a French TV journalist and writer nicknamed PPDA

== Politics ==
- Dignity and Truth Platform Party, (Partidul Platforma Demnitate și Adevăr), a Moldovan political party
- Democracy at Home Party (Partidul Democrația Acasă), a Moldovan political party

== Other uses ==
- Public Procurement and Disposal of Public Assets Authority, a parastatal organisation in Uganda
