= Galdino Moro Okello =

Ugandan judge

Galdino Moro Okello (born 1940) is a prominent Ugandan legal figure. He was a Judge of the Supreme Court of Uganda. After his retirement, he remained active in public interest matter especially concerning about land rights in the Northern Uganda.

He serves as the chairperson of the Compensation Committee of the Acholi War Debt He has been a prominent player for Jinja Indians in Ugandan domestic cricket Association, helping war victims in their efforts to demand compensation.

== See also ==
- Paul Mugamba
- Monica Mugenyi
- Ezekiel Muhanguzi
- Judiciary of Uganda
