= 2011 Nigerian Senate elections in Enugu State =

2011 Nigerian Senate election in Enugu State

The 2011 Nigerian Senate election in Enugu State was held on April 9, 2011, to elect members of the Nigerian Senate to represent Enugu State. Gilbert Nnaji representing Enugu East, Ike Ekweremadu representing Enugu West and Ayogu Eze representing Enugu North all won on the platform of Peoples Democratic Party.

== Overview ==
Affiliation	Party		Total
Affiliation	PDP	ACN	Total
Before Election			3
After Election	3	–	3

== Summary ==
District	Incumbent	Party	Elected Senator	Party
Enugu East			Gilbert Nnaji	PDP
Enugu West			Ike Ekweremadu	PDP
Enough North			Ayogu Eze	PDP

== Results ==
=== Enugu East ===
Peoples Democratic Party candidate Gilbert Nnaji won the election, defeating other party candidates.

2011 Nigerian Senate election in Enugu State
Party	Candidate	Votes	%
PDP	Gilbert Nnaji		
Total votes			
PDP hold			

=== Enugu West ===
Peoples Democratic Party candidate Ike Ekweremadu won the election, defeating other party candidates.

2011 Nigerian Senate election in Enugu State
Party	Candidate	Votes	%
PDP	Ike Ekweremadu		
Total votes			
PDP hold			

=== Enough North ===
Peoples Democratic Party candidate Ayogu Eze won the election, defeating party candidates.

2011 Nigerian Senate election in Enugu State
Party	Candidate	Votes	%
PDP	Ayogu Eze		
Total votes			
PDP hold			
