= Margaret Sentamu Masagazi =

Ugandan media entrepreneur

Margaret Masagazi
- Born: 22 April 1960 (age 66)
- Other name: Margaret Ssentamu Masagazi
- Citizenship: Uganda
- Education: Makerere University Uganda management institute University of Nairobi
- Occupations: Uganda business executive, communication expert, journalist.
- Organization: Founder of MaMa FM Executive director of Uganda media women's association.
- Parents: Edward Patrick Ssentamu (father); Theresa Nakalema Ssentamu (mother)
- Relatives: John Ddumba Ssentamu

Margaret Masagazi popularly known as Margaret Sentamu Masagazi (born on April 22, 1960) is a Ugandan business executive, and communication expert. Margaret is also the founder of MaMa FM and the executive director of Uganda Media Women's Association (UMWA)

== Background and education ==
She was born in Masaka to Edward Patrick Ssentamu and Theresa Nakalema Ssentamu who are now both dead. She is the sixth child of the 12 children and the eldest daughter in their family. Margaret is also a sister to John Ddumba Ssentamu the former Vice Chancellor of Makerere University.

She attended her primary education at St Theresa Bwanda, Kimaanya and St Clare Nkoni primary schools. She later joined Trinity College Nabbingo for both Uganda Certificate of Education (UCE) and Uganda Advanced Certificate of Education (UACE). Between 1980 and 1983, Margaret attained her degree in political science and sociology from Makerere University. She did PGD in journalism at Uganda Management Institute (UMI) and then did a Postgraduate Diploma in Mass Communication in 1985 at the University of Nairobi, before going back to Makerere University for a master's degree in Women and Gender Studies. While for her bachelor's degree at Makerere University, Margaret was very active in student politics as a member of the Democratic Party and a guild representative for Mary Stuart Hall and this led to her winning of the scholarship for her Postgraduate Diploma at the University of Nairobi.

== Career ==
She began her media work in 1983 on Radio Uganda. Before going for her Postgraduate Diploma at the University of Nairobi, she worked with Radio Uganda on a features and drama programme, in 1983, at the same time pursuing a diploma in journalism at Makerere University.

When she completed her postgraduate, she intern as a reporter at the Nation Media Group in Nairobi, and a correspondent for the Harare office of the Inter Press Service for one year. In 1987, after her return to Kampala, Sentamu joined Uganda Television ( which is now UBC) as a news editor for a year before joining the School of Journalism at Uganda Management Institute (UMI) as a lecturer.

In 1994, Margaret became the secretary general for the Uganda Media Women's Association, and later replaced Victoria Namusisi Nalongo as the chairperson when Victoria quit the position to join politics.

Margaret picked interest and appreciated women and gender between 1996 and 1998 when she researched on women in the media for her master's degree at the department of Women and Gender Studies, Makerere University. Due to lack of women's participation in the media, they helped to organise scholarship for women and 50 women were able to benefit. Since then, Margaret has been advocating for the integration of gender into media training and work to solve the issue of women marginalisation in media fraternity in Uganda. Margaret's activism is against sexism in the news media in Uganda.

== Personal life ==
Margaret is married and has children.

== Hobbies ==
Margaret loves dancing.

== See also ==
- John Ddumba Ssentamu
- Uganda Women's Network
- Masaka District
- Radio Uganda
