= Vincent Emmy Mugabo =

Ugandan lawyer and judge

- Born: 25 December 1974 (age 51); Uganda
- Citizenship: Uganda
- Education: Makerere University (Bachelor of Laws); Law Development Centre (Diploma in Legal Practice)
- Occupations: Lawyer, judge
- Years active: 2000 — present
- Known for: Law
- Title: Justice of the Uganda High Court

Vincent Emmy Mugabo, is a Ugandan lawyer and judge, who, on 4 October 2019, was nominated to sit on the Uganda High Court.

== Background and education ==
He graduated from the Faculty of Law of Makerere University, Uganda's largest and oldest public university, with a Bachelor of Laws. He also holds a Diploma in Legal Practice by the Law Development Centre in Kampala, Uganda's capital city.

== Career ==
In 2000, Mugabo ascended to the bench as a Grade One Magistrate. Over time, he rose through the ranks. At the time he was appointed to the High Court, he was the Registrar of the Uganda Supreme Court. He concurrently served as the Public Relations Officer of the Uganda Judiciary.

== See also ==
- Irene Mulyagonja
- Monica Mugenyi
- Ministry of Justice and Constitutional Affairs (Uganda)
