= John Wash Pam =

Nigerian statesman (1940–2014)

Deputy President of the Nigerian Senate
- In office 1 October 1979 – 1 October 1983

Senator of the Federal Republic of Nigeria
- In office 1 October 1979 – 1 October 1983
- Constituency: Jos

Member of the Constituent Assembly
- In office 1977–1978

Personal details
- Born: 22 October 1940 Foron, British Nigeria (present day Plateau State)
- Died: 1 May 2014
- Occupation: Politician

John Wash Pam (22 October 1940 – 1 May 2014) was a Nigerian politician.

== Early life and career ==
John Wash Pam hails from the rural area of rahwol fwi, ron Foron of BARKIN LADI local government of plateau state. He was the Deputy President of the Nigerian Senate from 1979 to 1983. He was elected into the senate on the platform of Dr Nnamdi Azikiwe's Nigerian Peoples Party (NPP). He was elected Deputy Senate President on the senate of the accord between his party and the ruling National Party of Nigeria (NPN). The accord was called "The NPN/NPP Accord".

Prior to his tenure in the Nigerian senate, senator Pam served as member of the constituent assembly that drafted the Second Nigerian Republic constitution (1979) from 1977 to 1978.

== Death ==
He died in 2014 at the age of 73 from prostate cancer.

== See also ==
- Deputy President of the Nigerian Senate
