= Elizabeth Kabanda =

Ugandan lawyer and judge

Lady Justice Elizabeth Kabanda

Justice of the High Court of Uganda

Personal details
- Born: Uganda
- Citizenship: Uganda
- Education: Makerere University (Bachelor of Laws); Law Development Center (Diploma in Legal Practice)
- Occupation: Lawyer and Judge

Elizbeth Kibula Kabanda is a Ugandan lawyer and judge, who serves as a Justice of the High Court of Uganda, since 2013. Prior to that, she served as the Deputy Registrar in-charge of the Criminal Division of High Court.

== Background and education ==
She was admitted to Makerere University, Uganda's oldest and largest public university, to study law, graduating with a Bachelor of Laws degree. She also has a Diploma in Legal Practice, obtained from the Law Development Centre, in Kampala. She is a registered legal practitioner in Uganda and a member of the Uganda Bar.

== Career ==
When she was first appointed to the High Court, she was assigned to the Land Division. In 2015, she was transferred from the Land Division to the Criminal Division.

In 2016, Justice Kabanda was assigned to the newly-created Mpigi Circuit, on a caretaker basis. She also served temporarily in the Mubende Circuit in 2016 and early 2017.

One of the cases she has presided over, include the case of State vs Stella Nyanzi, where the government accuses Stella Nyanzi, of two counts of Cyber Harassment and Offensive Communication contrary to the Computer Misuse Act of 2011.

== Controversy ==
In March 2017, the Inspector General of Government (IGG), instituted an investigation against Justice Elizabeth Kabanda, following complaints against her, filed by two people formerly under her supervision. His former driver, Matiya Akantorana, and her former body guard, Jimmy Eyou, petitioned the IGG, claiming that the judge had received their travel allowances from the accounting officer of the judiciary but had failed to pass those funds to the complainants.

After nearly one year of investigations, the IGG released her findings. She found that the judge has paid her two former subordinates for work for 30 days but they had worked for 40 days. The judge was ordered to pay the two complainants a total of USh630,000 (approx. US$180), as money she had shorted the duo.

== See also ==
- Judiciary of Uganda
- Irene Mulyagonja
