= Gyang Dalyop Datong =

Nigerian physician and politician

Honourable Member House of Representatives of Nigeria
- In office 2003–2007
- Preceded by: Song Isa Chungwom
- Succeeded by: Martha Bodunrin
- Constituency: Barkin-Ladi/Riyom Federal Constituency

Senator of the Federal Republic of Nigeria
- In office 2007–2012
- Preceded by: Timothy Aku Adudu
- Succeeded by: Gyang Pwajok
- Constituency: Plateau North Senatorial District

Personal details
- Born: 20 February 1959 Bachi Plateau State
- Died: 8 July 2012 (aged 53) Riyom, Plateau State
- Party: Peoples' Democratic Party (PDP)
- Spouse: Hanatu Gyem Datong
- Children: (4 children, Kaweng, Dang, Keziah and Kim (Late))
- Profession: Medical practitioner, politician

Gyang Dalyop Datong (20 February 1959 – 8 July 2012) was a Nigerian senator who represented the People's Democratic Party (PDP) in Plateau State. He became a member of the Nigerian Senate in 2007. On 12 April 2003, he was elected to the 5th House of Representatives on the platform of the ANPP defeating his closest rival James Vwi of the PDP. He represented Barkin Ladi/Riyom Federal Constituency from 2003 to 2007. Datong died on 8 July 2012 while attending a mass funeral of people who had been killed by Fulani herdsmen in Maase area of Riyom local government in Plateau State. The people at the funeral were attacked by gunmen thought to also be Fulani.

== Background ==
Datong was born on 20 February 1959. He has an MBBS from the University of Jos and an MPH from the University of Ghana, Legon. He was a medical director of Vom Christian Hospital. He was a member of the House of Representatives of Nigeria in the 5th (2003–2007) Assembly, representing the Barkin Ladi and Riyom constituency. In October 2004, he donated books, pens and chalk to secondary schools in Plateau State and announced scholarship awards for 40 students.

== Senate career ==
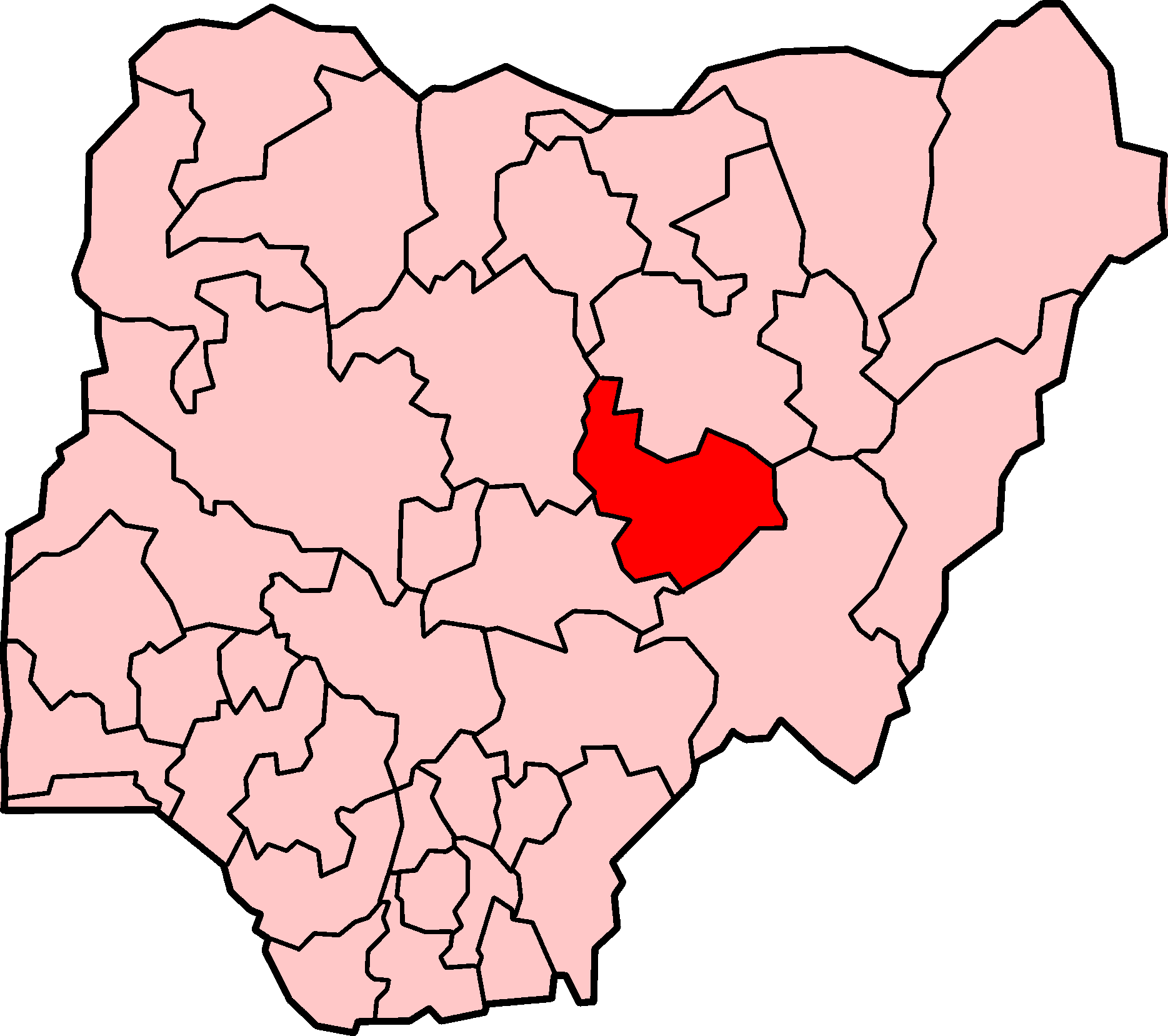
Plateau State in Nigeria

Gyang Dalyop Datong was elected to the National Senate for the Plateau North constituency in 2007, decisively defeating the previous Deputy Senate President, Alhaji Ibrahim Mantu. He was appointed to committees on States & Local Government, Health, Gas, Environment, Drugs Narcotics Anti Corruption and Aviation In November 2007, he donated five billboards carrying various road traffic cautious to the Federal Road Safety Commission worth N600,000.00.

In a July 2008 interview, the senator described the 40 years of military rule as a period where there was no progress, and said that in just eight years of democracy the country had made more progress.

In September 2008, Datong called for appointment of a health minister some months after Adenike Grange and Gabriel Adukwu were sacked because of concerns about their financial dealings when in office. As vice-chairman of the Senate Committee on Health, he spoke out the lack of a national Health framework and indicated that the Senate was working on the Health Bill.

In January 2009, after the impeachment of the former Speaker of the Plateau State Assembly, Emmanuel Go'ar, Datong said the party accepted the change in the leadership of the House under Istifanus Mwansat.
