= Victoria Katamba =

Ugandan lawyer and judge

- Born: 1972 (age 53–54); Uganda
- Citizenship: Ugandan
- Education: Makerere University (Bachelor of Laws); Law Development Centre (Diploma in Legal Practice); Institute of Chartered Secretaries and Administrators (Graduate ICSA); Eastern and Southern African Management Institute (Master of Business Administration)
- Occupations: Lawyer and judge
- Years active: 1997 — present
- Known for: The law
- Title: Justice of the Uganda High Court
- Children: Paul Lujjo Katamba, Joshua Simwogerere Katamba, Emmanuel Mutyaba Katamba and Matayo Semakula tutu Katamba

Victoria Nakintu Nkwanga Katamba, commonly referred to as Victoria Katamba, is a Ugandan lawyer and Judge of the Uganda High Court, effective Friday 5 October 2019. She serves as the Head Judge of the Masaka High Court Circuit, since October 2021.

== Background and education ==
Nakintu was born in the Central Region of Uganda circa 1972. After attending local primary and secondary schools, she was admitted to Makerere University in 1992.

She graduated from Makerere in 1995 with a Bachelor of Laws degree. The following year, she received the Postgraduate Diploma in Legal Practice, awarded by the Law Development Centre, in Kampala. Her degree of Master of Business Administration (MBA), was obtained from the Eastern and Southern African Management Institute (EASAMI), in 2017.

Nakintu is also a graduate of the Institute of Chartered Secretaries and Administrators of the United Kingdom, since 2006.

== Career ==
Before the Bench

Nakintu started out as a legal assistant at Ayigihugu & Company Advocates, in the late 1990s. She then transferred to Karuhanga & Advocates, transitioning from serving regular retail clients to working with corporate customers. While there, Karuhanga & Advocates merged with other legal firms to establish Kampala Associated Advocates, an associate firm of Denton Wilde Sapte. In September 2004, she left Kampala Associated Advocates to form her own law firm; Nkwanga & Partners Advocates. She also served as a lecturer at the Institute of Chartered Secretaries and Administrators in Uganda (ICSAU) from January 2018 until December 2019.

As a Judge

In October 2019, she was appointed to sit of the High Court of Uganda. She was assigned to the Court's circuit in Masaka City. In October 2021, she was appointed as Head of the Masaka Circuit of the High Court of Uganda.

== Other considerations ==
Effective December 2020 Lady Justice Victoria Nakintu Nkwanga Katamba serves as the chairperson of the Ugandan chapter of International Federation of Women Lawyers (FIDA).

== See also ==
- High Court of Uganda
- Court of Appeal of Uganda
- Supreme Court of Uganda
