= Emily Maractho =

Ugandan professor and scholar

- Citizenship: Uganda
- Education: Uganda Christian University
- Occupation: Journalist

Emily Maractho also known as Maractho Emily Comfort is the Lecturer of Journalism and Media Studies at Uganda Christian University. She was awarded the "Next Generation Social Sciences in Africa: Doctoral Dissertation Research Fellowship" in 2015. The goal was to study Development Studies at the University of KwaZulu Natal on media, women, and public life in Uganda, interrogating representation, interaction and engagement. She leads the Faculty of Journalism, Media, and Communication. In 2018, she replaced Prof. Monica B. Chibita, who became the first Dean of the faculty.

== Career ==
Emily Marachto is the Vice Chairperson of UMWA (Uganda Media Women's Association). During her panel discussion in 2019, she urged the need for media companies to do more mentoring of interns and to create a more peaceful environment for them so as to encourage them to stay on after training.

== Academic authorship ==
She has also carried out a substantial amount of research, including:

- Determinants of participation in political communication in Uganda's broadcast media: implications for women. This study sought to establish why there is a limited role of women and was conducted by case study and content analysis designs.
- Broadcasting governance and development in 'Museveni's Uganda'. The study examined the media in Uganda during Museveni's presidency with specific reference to broadcasting.
- (Re)producing cultural narratives on women in public affairs programs in Uganda. This is part of a larger study on representation, interaction and engagement of women and broadcast media in Uganda.
- Mass media, women and public life in Uganda: interrogating representation, interaction and engagement. It studied factors that are relevant to facilitating women's participation in public life.
- Local Governments and Primary Education in Uganda. This study sought to find out what explains the difference in local governments' performance across two districts that were given similar powers and share a similar history.
- The framing of COVID-19 in Uganda's New Vision and Daily Monitor newspapers. This is a book chapter that analyzed the coverage of the pandemic through the lens of framing theory. It presents an analysis of selected published material from online sites of two newspapers between 10 March and 2 June 2020.
- Elections and the media in post-conflict Africa: Votes and voices for peace.
- Popular Participation in the Integration of the East African Community: "Eastafricanness and Eastafricanization".
- Camera, commerce & conscience: Afrowood and the crisis of purpose.
- Uganda citizens' sovereignty and the Easy Access Consulting Nexus (EAC).

== See also ==
- Uganda Christian University
- Monica Chibita
- John Senyonyi
- University of KwaZulu-Natal
- Gloria Laker Aciro
