= Alice Komuhangi Khaukha =

Ugandan Lawyer and Judge

- Born: Rujumbura, Rukungiri District
- Citizenship: Ugandan
- Education: Masters Degree in Institutional management and Leadership (MIML) from Uganda Management Institute, Master of Laws (LLM) Degree from Makerere University, Postgraduate Diploma in Legal Practice from the Law Development Center, Bachelor of Laws (LLB) Honors Degree from Makerere University
- Occupation: Judge
- Years active: 2000-date
- Employer: High Court of Uganda

Alice Komuhangi Khaukha is a Ugandan lawyer and judge who has made contributions to the Ugandan legal system. She has held various positions within the Office of the Director of Public Prosecutions (ODPP) and recently became a High Court Judge for international Crimes Division as the Focal Judge for SGBV.

== Background and education ==
Born in Kyatoko, Rujumbura, Rukungiri district, she attended Immaculate Heart Girls' SSS Nyakibaale for her O' Level and A level studies. She holds a Masters Degree in Institutional management and Leadership (MIML) from Uganda Management Institute (UMI), a Master of Laws (LLM) Degree from Makerere University, a Postgraduate Diploma in Legal Practice from the Law Development Center and a Bachelor of Laws (LLB) Honors Degree from Makerere University.

== Career and accomplishments ==
Before her appointment as a judge, Justice Khaukha served as the Deputy Director of Public Prosecutions (DPP), overseeing the Directorate of Inspections, Quality Assurance Research, and Training at the ODPP. Her responsibilities included enforcing performance standards, promoting efficient management of public prosecutions, and ensuring the effective administration of justice. She was a team leader in the investigations and prosecution of Global Fund cases, head of the Unit, and later, head of the Anti-Corruption Department. She joined the ODPP as a Pupil State Attorney in 1999 and steadily rose through the ranks to become a Senior Principal State Attorney in 2014. Public Prosecutions.

She was Deputy Head of the Land Crimes Department (2013), where she was responsible for investigating and prosecuting land-related crimes across Uganda. Head of the Anti-Corruption Department (April 2018), where prosecuted corruption and money laundering cases with a conviction rate of over 80%. She also spearheaded the establishment of the Asset Recovery Network for Eastern Africa (ARIN-EA), facilitating information sharing on illicitly acquired assets. Child-Friendly Spaces and Training Curriculum, where she pioneered the concept of child-friendly spaces within the justice system. She developed a training curriculum on child psychology, child development, and child engagement for prosecutors nationwide. Kampala Regional Office Head (2013-2016) where she headed the busiest region of the ODPP, handling complex cases. Contributions to Legal Frameworks, where she participated in the development of key legislation, including the Anti-Corruption Act, Whistle Blowers Protection Act, and the National Strategy on Zero Tolerance to Corruption. In 2017, she was appointed as the Senior Assistant Director of Public Prosecutions, a post she held until her appointment as Deputy Director of Public Prosecutions.

== Cases ==
- Global Fund cases.
- American couple in Uganda accused of torturing boy.
- Ssegirinya Case.
- Rwenzururu King Charles Wesley Mumbere case.

== Awards ==
On Jun 7 2020, she was awarded with the Governance Impact Award by Vine Academy which aims to acknowledge and recognize individuals of the Christian faith who are making significant contributions in their respective fields of influence.

== See also ==
- Lydia Mugambe
- Anna Bitature Mugenyi
- Monica Mugenyi
- Olive Kazaarwe Mukwaya
- Irene Mulyagonja
- Elizabeth Musoke
- Faith Mwondha
