= Flavia Nassuna Matovu =

- Born: March 18, 1969 (age 57); Uganda
- Education: Makerere University (Bachelor of Laws); Law Development Centre (Postgraduate Diploma in Legal Practice); Uganda Christian University (Master of Laws)
- Occupation: judge
- Title: Justice of the High Court of Uganda

Flavia Nassuna Matovu (born 18 March 1969) is a Ugandan judicial officer currently serving in the Land Division of the High Court of Uganda.

She was appointed to this position in May 2022 by President Yoweri Museveni, following recommendations from the Judicial Service Commission

== Background and Education ==
Flavia is married with four children. Below is her educational background.

Secondary Education
School	Certificate
Gayaza High School	UCE
St. Joseph's Secondary School, Naggalama	UACE

Tertiary Education
Institution	Award	Year
Makerere University	Bachelor of Laws (LL.B)	1991–1994
Law Development Centre	Postgraduate Diploma in Legal Practice	
Uganda Christian University,Mukono	Master of Business Administration (MBA)	2016–2018

== Career ==
Below is Flavia's judicial career.

Legal and Judicial
Year	Position held	Location/Remarks
1995 – 1999	Legal Assistant	Worked with Ms. Kityo & Co. Advocates and later with Ms. Kiyingi & Co. Advocates
1999 – 2008	Grade One Magistrate	Served in Nakawa, Mpigi, and Masaka
2008 – 2015	Chief Magistrate	Posted in Entebbe, Mpigi, Luwero, and Nakawa
2015 – 2020	Deputy Registrar	Served in the Execution & Bailiffs Division and later the Inspectorate of Courts
2020	Registrar	Promoted to full Registrar in the Judiciary
May 2022 – Present	Judge, High Court of Uganda (Acting Appointment)	Judge, High Court of Uganda (Acting Appointment)

== Cases ==
In Namitala (Administrator of the Estate of Nantongo) v. Bakyengo & 3 Others (2022), Flavia ruled on a dispute regarding estate administration and land ownership. She presided over a case involving a land sale agreement in Ndawula v. Nakalanzi and Another (2023). She has also handled other land cases such as Renatta Namudulo v. Uganda Electricity Transmission Company Limited and National Housing and Construction Company Limited v. National Water and Sewerage Corporation, listed in the Land Division cause lists.

== See also ==
- Alfonse Owiny-Dollo
- Judiciary of Uganda
- Parliament of Uganda
- Cabinet of Uganda
