= Jessica Naiga =

Ugandan lawyer and judge

- Born: 25 December 1965; Uganda
- Died: 25 June 2018 (aged 53); Kampala, Uganda
- Citizenship: Uganda
- Education: Makerere University (Bachelor of Laws); Law Development Centre (Diploma in Legal Practice)
- Occupations: Lawyer, judge
- Years active: 1992–2018
- Known for: Law
- Title: Justice of the High Court of Uganda

Jessica Naiga Ayebazibwe, (née Jessica Naiga), also Naiga Ayebazibwe, (1 January 1965 – 25 June 2018) was a Ugandan lawyer and judge who serves as a justice of the High Court of Uganda, since 29 April 2014.

== Background and education ==
She was born in Uganda and attended local schools for her primary and secondary education. She obtained a Bachelor of Laws degree, from Makerere University, Uganda's oldest and largest public university. She also held a Diploma in Legal Practice, awarded by the Law Development Centre in Kampala, the national capital and largest city in the country. She was a member of the Uganda Bar.

== Career ==
Prior to her appointment to the high court, for the seven years from 2007 until 2014, she served as a legal officer at the Uganda National Environment Management Authority.

She began her legal career in 1992 as a legal assistant with Bazire D’bango and Company Advocates. When she left the law firm, she was hired by the national tax body, Uganda Revenue Authority. She served there for about 10 years as a revenue officer.

After her appointment to the high court, she was assigned to the Family Division of the court.

== Personal life ==
Lady Justice Jessica Naiga Ayebazibwe was the mother of three children.

== See also ==
- Julia Sebutinde
- Catherine Bamugemereire
