= Haruna Abubakar =

Nigerian politician and lawyer (1952–2005)

Deputy President of the Nigerian Senate
- In office 3 June 1999 – 18 November 1999
- President: Evan Enwerem
- Succeeded by: Ibrahim Mantu

Senator for Nasarawa South
- In office 3 June 1999 – 3 June 2003
- Succeeded by: Emmanuel Okpede

Personal details
- Born: 6 June 1952 Lafia, Northern Region, British Nigeria (now in Nasarawa State, Nigeria)
- Died: 27 February 2005 (aged 52) London, United Kingdom
- Party: National Party of Nigeria (1979–1983); Peoples Democratic Party (1998–2003)
- Education: Ahmadu Bello University (LL.B.)
- Occupation: Politician; lawyer; businessman

Haruna Abubakar (6 June 1952 – 27 February 2005) was a Nigerian lawyer and politician who served as the deputy president of the Nigerian Senate in 1999.

Abubakar was born in Lafia, Nasarawa State, on 6 June 1952. He lost his father at a young age and was quickly adapted by his young uncle, the only person he grew up knowing as a father late Dalhatu Bawa.

He is a graduate of the prestigious Ahmadu Bello University, Zaria where he studied law.

As a lawyer, businessman and politician, Abubakar was a onetime legal adviser to the National Party of Nigeria (NPN) during the Nigerian Second Republic. He was Company Secretary and Legal Advisor to Benue Cement Company, he was also commissioner of Justice and Attorney General of Plateau State. He contested as running mate to Bagudu Hirse for the seat of governor and deputy governor of Plateau State, where they lost and subsequently Haruna was appointed as the Managing Director of Pipelines and Petroleum Products Marketing Company during the military regime of General Sani Abacha.

At the start of the Nigerian Fourth Republic, running on the Peoples Democratic Party (PDP) platform, he was elected Senator for the Nasarawa South constituency of Nasarawa State, Nigeria. He took office on 3 June 1999.

After taking his seat in the Senate in June 1999 he was appointed to committees on Selection (vice chairman), Senate Services, Petroleum, Judiciary, Economic Affairs and Local & Foreign Debts. He was also appointed Deputy Senate President in 1999, but later in November that year he resigned his position after the senate president was forced to resign, paving way for Sen. Ibrahim Nasiru Mantu from Plateau State to take over as the deputy senate president. In 2003, after leaving the senate, Haruna contested for the seat of governor of Nasarawa State under the NDP against the incumbent Sen. Abdullahi Adamu, he lost the highly contested election, and went ahead to election tribunal.

== Death ==
Abubakar died in a London hospital after a protracted illness on 27 February 2005. He was buried in Lafia.
