= Deputy President of the Nigerian Senate =

Second-highest ranking-official of the Senate of Nigeria

Deputy President of the Senate of the Federal Republic of Nigeria
- Incumbent; Barau Jibrin since 13 June 2023
- Legislative Branch of the Federal Government
- Style: Mr Deputy President
- Member of: Nigerian Senate; National Assembly Commission
- Seat: National Assembly Complex, Three Arms Zone, Abuja
- Appointer: Indirect Senate Election
- Term length: 4 years renewable
- Constituting instrument: Constitution of Nigeria
- Inaugural holder: Haruna Abubakar (Fourth Republic)
- Formation: 3 June 1999; 27 years ago (Fourth Republic)

The deputy president of the Nigerian Senate is the second highest-ranking member of the Senate of Nigeria, after the President of the Senate. The current deputy president is Barau Jibrin of the All Progressives Congress. The deputy president presides over the senate in the absence of the senate president. The deputy president is elected by a majority of the Senate.

== List of Deputy Senate Presidents ==
Deputy Senate Presidents of Nigeria
Deputy Senate President	Term	Party
Adeniji Adele II	1 October 1960 – 12 July 1964	MGA
Amos M Olaleye	1964 – 15 January 1966	
John Wash Pam	1 October 1979 – December 1983	NPP
Mamman Abubakar Danmusa	1 October 1983 – 31 December 1983	NPN
Albert Legogie	5 December 1992 – 17 November 1993	SDP
Haruna Abubakar	3 June 1999 – 18 November 1999	PDP
Ibrahim Mantu	10 August 2001 – 5 June 2007	PDP
Ike Ekweremadu	5 June 2007 – 9 June 2019	PDP
Obarisi Ovie Omo-Agege	11 June 2019 – 11 June 2023	APC
Barau Jibrin	13 June 2023 – present	APC
