= Augustine Nshimye =

Ugandan judge and politician (died 2026)

- Born: Uganda Protectorate
- Died: 3 April 2026; Kampala, Uganda
- Citizenship: Uganda
- Education: Makerere University (Bachelor of Laws); Law Development Centre (Diploma in Legal Practice)
- Occupations: Lawyer, judge
- Years active: 1967–?
- Known for: Law
- Title: Justice of the Supreme Court of Uganda

Augustine Nshimye (died 3 April 2026) was a Ugandan judge and politician who served as a member of the Supreme Court of Uganda from 2015.

== Career ==
Nshimye's career started in 1967 as a senior clerk. From 1986 until 1988, he served as deputy chief registrar. In 1988, he went into private practice.

In 2008, he was appointed a Justice of the Court of Appeal (which also serves as the Constitutional Court). In 2010, he temporarily served as an acting Justice of the Supreme Court. He was appointed to the Supreme Court in September 2015.

Between 1988 and 2008, he served as the member of parliament for Mityana South constituency. He also served as the cabinet minister for regional cooperation in the NRM government.

== Other responsibilities ==
Nshimye was one of the founding members of the ruling National Resistance Movement political party. In 2015, he was appointed the inspector of courts, a responsibility he served concurrently with his role at the Supreme court.

== Death ==
Nshimye died from cancer in Kampala on 3 April 2026.

== See also ==
- Judiciary of Uganda
- Supreme Court of Uganda
- Cabinet of Uganda
- Parliament of Uganda
