= Susan Okalany =

Ugandan lawyer and judge

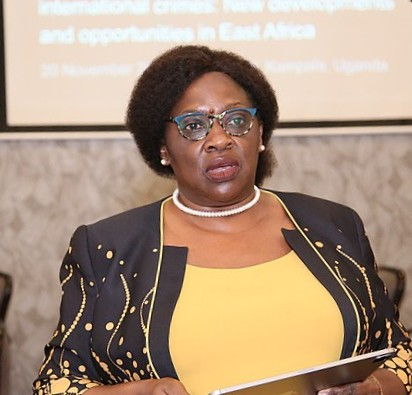
- in 2023, hosting a conference
- Born: Uganda
- Education: Makerere University (Bachelor of Laws); Law Development Centre (Postgraduate Diploma in Legal Practice)
- Occupations: Lawyer, judge
- Title: Justice of the High Court of Uganda

Susan Okalany is a Ugandan lawyer and judge who sits on the High Court of Uganda. Before she was appointed to the bench, she was a principal state attorney in the Directorate of Public Prosecutions.

== Background and education ==
Se was born in the Eastern Region of Uganda. She attended local primary and secondary schools. She graduated from the Faculty of Law at Makerere University, Uganda's largest and oldest public university, with a Bachelor of Laws degree, in 1992. The following year, she was awarded a Postgraduate Diploma in Legal Practice by the Law Development Centre in Kampala, Uganda's capital city.

== Career ==
In 1994, after graduation from the Law Development Centre, Okalany was employed by the American Embassy in Kampala, as a consular assistant. From there, she became a researcher at Forum for Women in Democracy. She then was employed by Ochieng Wellborn and Company Advocates as a legal assistant. When she left there, she joined the State Attorney's office. She served as the resident state attorney in the districts of Tororo, Iganga, Mbarara and Masaka.

She was then transferred to the Directorate of Public Prosecutions. While there, she rose through the ranks to become the head of the gender and sexual offences division and also the electoral offences investigations and prosecutions task force. At the time she was appointed to the high court, she was a principal state attorney.

=== As a prosecutor ===
Okalany was the lead prosecutor in the Kampala bombings trial. The trial started in September 2011. Two self-confessed conspirators, Mahmoud Mugisha and Edris Nsubuga, pleaded guilty and were convicted.

Another prominent case that she prosecuted was the conviction of Jacqueline Uwera Nsenga for the murder of her husband, Juvenal Kananura Nsenga, whom she ran over with a car, when he opened the gate to their home.

=== As a judge ===
In 2016, Okalany was appointed a High Court judge and was assigned to the court's Family Division. She was posted to the Mbale circuit of the court's division. While there, she received death threats in a case related to Bukedea District Cattle Market, leading her to request security assistance from the president of Uganda.

== Other considerations ==
In September 2017, Okalany was bestowed with the award of Prosecutor of the Year, by the International Association of Prosecutors. The award was in recognition of her role as lead prosecutor of the 11 July 2010 Kampala bombing terrorists.

In June 2020, Okalany was among the four top contenders for the ICC prosecutor job. If elected, she would replace Fatou Bom Bensouda, who has occupied the position since 2012.

== See also ==
- Ministry of Justice and Constitutional Affairs (Uganda)
