= Emmanuel Go'ar =

Nigerian politician

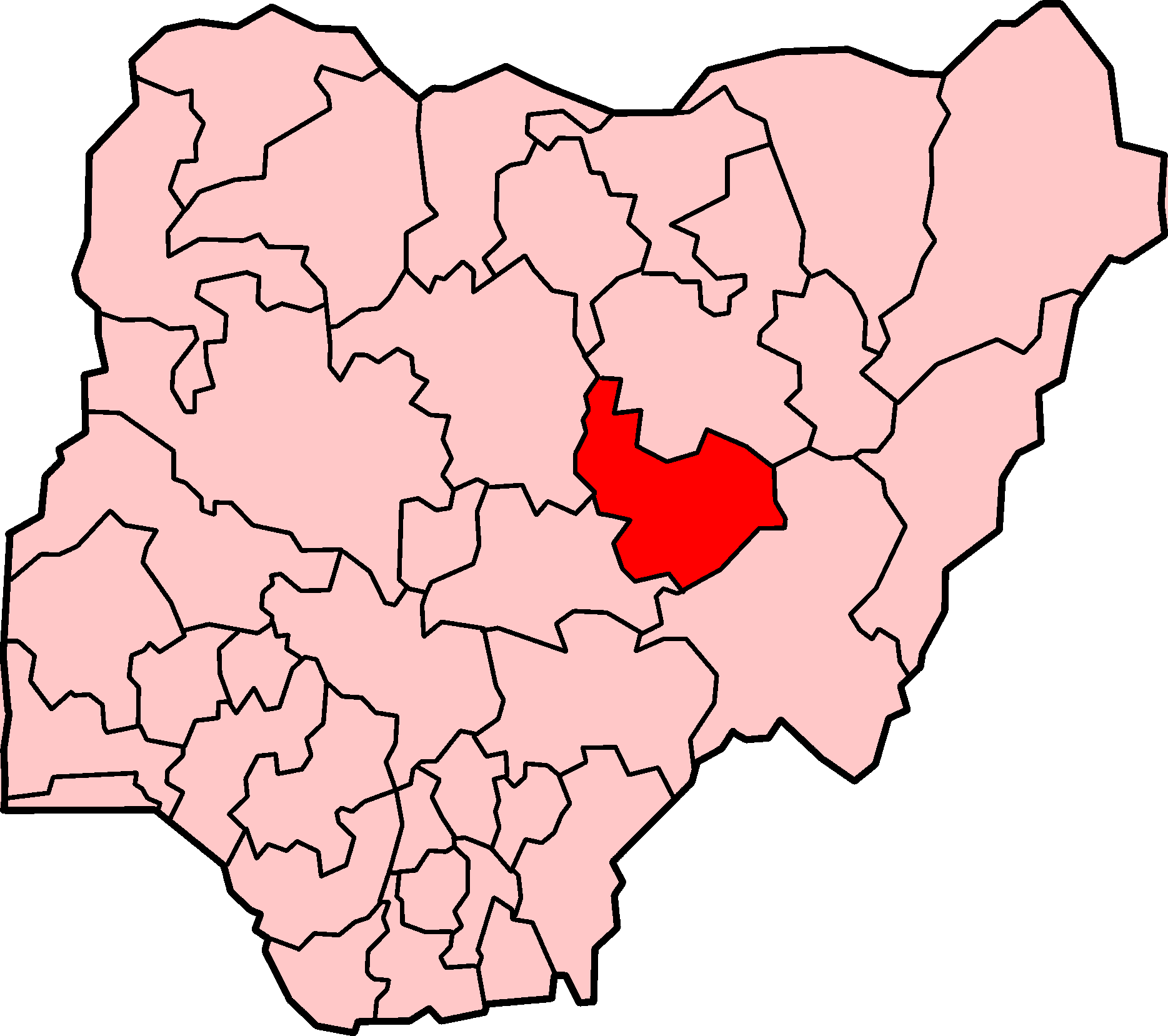
Plateau State in Nigeria

Emmanuel Go’ar is a Nigerian politician who was speaker of the Plateau State Assembly in Jos from April 2007 until he was impeached in February 2009. The impeachment was related to a struggle between President Umaru Yar'Adua and Plateau State Governor, Jonah Jang over a sectarian crisis in Jos, the Plateau State capital.

Emmanuel Go’ar was elected to the Plateau State Assembly in 2007 as the People's Democratic Party (PDP) candidate and made Speaker of the House. In November 2007, his election was nullified on the basis that the ballots omitted the logo of the rival Democratic People's Party (DPP), but he retained his seat during the subsequent appeal process.

In March 2008, the Plateau State House of Assembly gave governor Jonah Jang the power to appoint caretaker committee chairmen for local councils. The governor planned to swear in Peoples Democratic Party candidates for the council positions. The Conference of Nigeria Political Parties took a protest letter to Emmanuel Go’ar as Speaker of the Assembly. The police sealed the premises of the All Nigeria Peoples Party (ANPP) because of its plans to demonstrate against the decision.

In October 2008, Emmanuel Go'ar read a letter from governor Jonah Jang asking the House of Assembly to dissolve the caretaker local government committees, to be followed by elections. In December 2008, following riots during the council elections in which over 300 people died, the house of Assembly passed a resolution signed by Emmanuel Go’ar that called for tolerance between Christians and Muslims in the state and praised the Federal and the Plateau State governments for their prompt intervention in forestalling the spread of the crisis. In January 2009, after 26 suspected mercenaries arrested in Plateau State were transferred to the Force Criminal Investigation Department, Abuja, Emmanuel Go'ar said the house was setting up the committee to conduct an investigation into the crisis and to correct defects in the local electoral laws, if any.

Go'ar was impeached in February 2009 after 17 of the 24 members of the Assembly signed a petition alleging that he was incompetent, although he remained a member of the Assembly. After his impeachment, Go'ar was replaced as speaker by Istifanus Caleb Mwansat. In April 2009, the appellate court dismissed Go'ar's appeal against the November 2007 ruling that nullified his election. However, he won the re-run election in June 2009. As a strong supporter of Governor Jonah Jang, Go'ar's reelection meant that a faction in the Plateau State assembly considering impeaching the governor lacked the necessary 2/3 majority.
