= Ike Ekweremadu =

Nigerian politician and lawyer (born 1962)

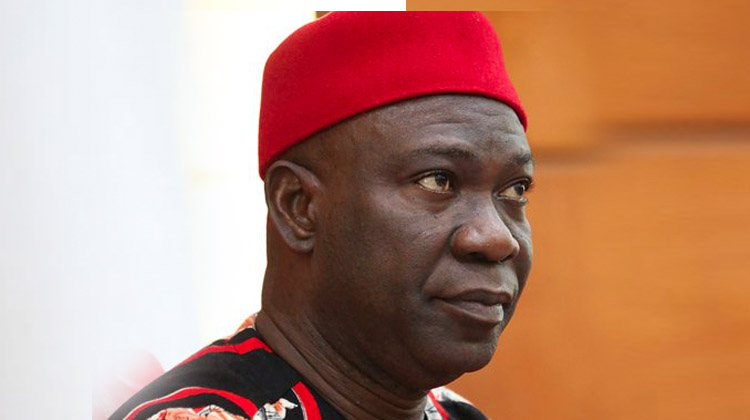

Deputy President of the Nigerian Senate
- In office 5 June 2007 – 9 June 2019
- President: David Mark; Bukola Saraki
- Preceded by: Ibrahim Mantu
- Succeeded by: Ovie Omo-Agege

Senator for Enugu West
- In office 3 June 2003 – 5 May 2023
- Preceded by: Ben-Collins Ndu
- Succeeded by: Ostia Ngwu

Personal details
- Born: 12 May 1962 (age 64) Amachara Mpu, Eastern Region, Nigeria (now Amachara Mpu, Aninri Local Government Area, Enugu State, Nigeria)
- Party: People's Democratic Party (PDP)
- Spouse: Nwanneka Ekweremadu
- Children: 4
- Education: University of Nigeria; University of Abuja
- Profession: Lawyer, Politician
- Criminal information
- Imprisoned at: HM Prison Wandsworth

Ike Ekweremadu (born 12 May 1962) is a Nigerian politician and a lawyer who hails from Enugu State and served in the Senate of Nigeria for Enugu West from 3 June 2003 to 5 May 2023 . He is a member of the People's Democratic Party, and was the Deputy President of the Nigerian Senate for three (3) consecutive (6th, 7th and 8th) senate. On 23 June 2022, Ekweremadu and his wife were charged in the UK with conspiring to arrange the travel of a 21-year-old into the UK in order to harvest organs. He was found guilty on 23 March 2023 at the Old Bailey. On 5 May 2023, he was sentenced to nine years and eight months imprisonment.

== Early life ==
Ike Ekweremadu was born at Amachara Mpu in Aninri Local Government Area of Enugu State, and is of Igbo origin. He holds both bachelor's and master's degree in law from the University of Nigeria, and was called to the Nigerian Bar in 1987. He also holds Doctor of Philosophy degree in law from the University of Abuja, Nigeria.

== Political appointments ==
He was appointed as the Executive Chairman of Aninri Local Government Council on the platform of the United Nigeria Congress Party (UNCP) in 1997 and won the Best Council Chairman of the year, in 1997.

== Senatorial career ==
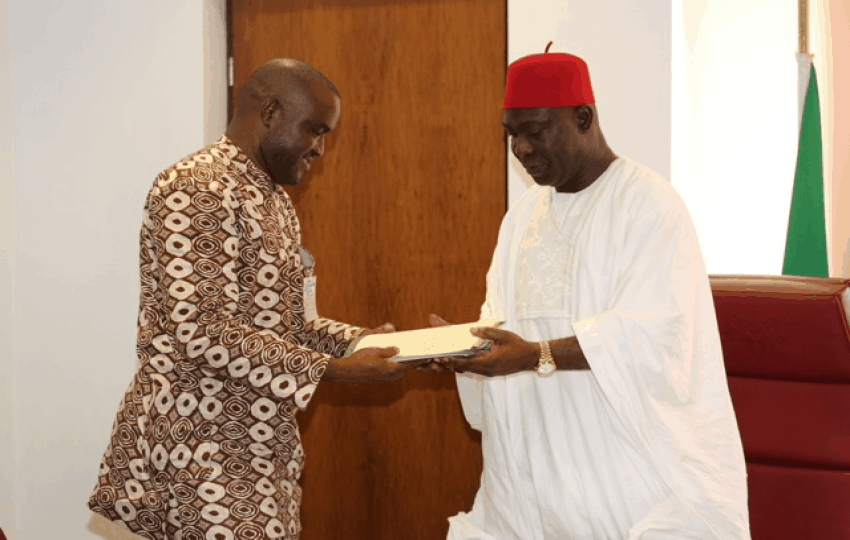
The Guardian and erstwhile Federal Commissioner of the Nigerian National Human Rights Commission [NHRC] Comrade Emmanuel Onwubiko advocacy visit to the Deputy Senate President Senator Ike Ekweremadu

On 12 April 2003, he was elected to the Nigerian Senate. In September 2003, as Vice Chairman of the senate committee on Information, Chief Ekweremadu stated that the senate would make a serious investigation into allegations of bribery leveled by Federal Capital Territory (FCT) minister Mallam Nasir el-Rufai. Relations between Nasir El-Rufai and the senate continued to be hostile, and El-Rufai was eventually charged with corruption in 2008. In 2005, Ike Ekweremadu was beaten in the race for President of the Senate of Nigeria by Senator Kenechukwu Nnamani.

In July 2006, as spokesperson for the Southern Senators’ Forum, Ekweremadu denied charges that they had made an agreement to return power to the North in the 2007 elections. In September 2006, President Olusegun Obasanjo asked the Senate to review a report by the Economic and Financial Crimes Commission that laid charges of fraud against Vice-President Atiku Abubakar. Ike Ekweremadu promised to establish a committee of inquiry whose report would be submitted to the Senate, although he noted that impeachment would be difficult since it would require a 2/3 majority.

Ekweremadu was returned in the 29 April 2007 Nigerian National Assembly election, and elected to the position of deputy senate president. He was given the job of handing out committee chairmanship positions allocated to the southeast zone, making decisions that were unpopular with leaders such as Senator Chris Anyanwu, who failed to get the positions they wanted. In July 2007, Ekweremadu was instrumental in defusing objections to the controversial nomination of Ojo Maduekwe to a ministerial position.

When President Umaru Yar'Adua’s Principal Private Secretary, David Edevbie, was allegedly indicted in September 2009 in a British court for corruption and money laundering, Ekweremadu refused to take a position, stating that he did not know the facts. In September 2009, Ekweremadu was named co-chairman of a committee to conduct the primary elections for the Peoples Democratic Party’s governorship candidate for Anambra State.

=== Senatorial election 2011 ===
Ekweremadu was reelected as Senator for Enugu West in the April 2011 elections, receiving 112,806 votes. The closest runner-up was the candidate of the Peoples for Democratic Change (PDC), Jackson Ezeoffor, who got 7,522 votes.

He was re-elected in the 2015 senate election.

=== Senatorial election 2019 ===
On 23 February 2019, Ekweremadu was re-elected as senator representing the Enugu West senatorial district For the Fifth Consecutive time having polled 86,088 votes to defeat his closest rival, Mrs Juliet Ibekaku-Nwagwu of the All Progressives Congress (APC) who polled 15,187 votes.

Following his election, Ekweremadu indicated he would retire from the Nigerian Senate by not running for a further term in 2023.

On 11 June 2019, Ekweremadu lost his bid to become Deputy Senate President of the Nigerian 9th Senate. Ekweremadu contested against Ovie Omo-Agege who scored 68 votes to emerge Winner. In the early hours of Tuesday, he returned his official cars.

== ECOWAS ==
In September 2009, he was appointed to lead the Economic Community of West African States (ECOWAS) ad hoc committee to work for the return of constitutional order in the Niger Republic. He was elected First Deputy Speaker of the ECOWAS Parliament and emerged the Speaker of the regional parliament in August 2011.

== Attack in Nuremberg, Germany ==
On 17 August 2019, while attending the Second Annual Cultural Festival and Convention organized by Ndi-Igbo Germany in Nuremberg, Ekweremadu became the victim of a violent attack when members of the Indigenous People of Biafra IPOB stormed the venue of the event and began to question Ekweremadu about the killings of Igbos when the Nigerian army staged Operation Crocodile Smile and Python Dance. They also questioned Ekweremadu about his purported role in the proscription of IPOB in Nigeria. The situation soon degenerated to the extent that Ekweremadu was physically dragged out of the venue, assaulted and pelted with eggs. He would later announce that he got away from the venue with little injuries. The leader of IPOB, Nnamdi Kanu issued a statement on the attack on Ekweremadu calling it a "polite warning" while at the same time warning other Igbo governors of a possible similar treatment. The four suspects were arrested and convicted of physical assault and sentenced to 20 days of hard labor without any option of fine.

== 2022 UK organ-harvesting conviction ==
On 23 June 2022, Ekweremadu was charged alongside his wife, his daughter and Dr Obinna Obeta with conspiring to arrange the travel of a 21-year-old from Lagos into the UK in order to harvest organs. On 23 March 2023 Ekweremadu, his wife and Dr Obinna Obeta were convicted of conspiring to exploit the man for his kidney. Prosecutors told the Old Bailey trial that the victim was brought to the UK in 2022 to provide a kidney in an £80,000 private transplant at the Royal Free Hospital, London. Prosecutors said that the victim was offered up to £7,000 and a job in exchange for traveling to the UK. The prosecution had confirmed the maximum sentence in the organ harvesting case is one of life. The organ was to be removed and given to the couple's daughter - she was cleared of the same charge. On 5 May 2023, Ekweremadu was sentenced to nine years and eight months imprisonment. Meanwhile, Obeta was sentenced to ten years imprisonment and Ekweremadu's wife was sentenced to four years and six months imprisonment.

== Awards and honours ==
- CFR, Knight of the Good Shepherd, Ikeoha Ndigbo
- Rotary Club's Outstanding Citizen of the World 2017
- Dr. Kwame Nkurumah Africa Leadership Award (2005)

Preceded by Mahamane Ousmane	Speaker of ECOWAS Parliament; 2011-	Succeeded by Incumbent
