= Washington International University =

Online, unaccredited educational institution

Washington International University is an online unaccredited institution of higher education founded in 1994 and currently incorporated in the British Virgin Islands. It describes itself as a "cyberspace university" and a "university without borders", serving clients from around the world online. The university website states that WIU's graduates have come from 112 countries.

The name "Washington International University" is used in promotional materials for other unaccredited distance learning institutions. There are no known accredited institutions by this name.

== Academic programs ==
The school offers bachelor's, master's and doctoral degrees in business, liberal arts and engineering.

The school offers "traditional" and "accelerated" degree programs. The traditional programs require students to complete just ten courses for a bachelor's degree and eight for a master's, along with a senior research project. The accelerated degree program allows completion of any degree within one year. For the accelerated program, according to the university's website, "There are no textbooks to read, curriculum to follow or formal exams to take." For either a bachelor's or a master's degree, a student must submit three book reports on books selected by the student's advisor and a research paper on a topic related to the student's field of study. For the doctorate, students must complete a thesis under the guidance of an instructor. The university's advanced degree programs take into account academic credit for work experience, which is similar to that given by the United States Citizenship and Immigration Services. This would allow a student to earn his or her degree in a shorter time frame.

The university points out on its Web site that its course materials "use simple language so that an average person can understand what is written." The site also claims a "cooperation" with Encyclopædia Britannica, to provide students with a reference library.

The school's website lists seven faculty members, including two with doctorates, one with Ed.D, three with master's degrees and one with a J.D. degree. According to a newspaper report in 2002, Karademir called the faculty "advisers", not "professors".

== Accreditation status and recognition of degrees ==
The university has not sought educational accreditation and does not have a campus. As recently as October 2012, the Oregon Office of Degree Authorization stated on its website that WIU is located in the British Virgin Islands and that its degrees are not recognized.

Lack of accreditation has consequences for WIU degree holders in some circumstances. For instance, the Michigan Civil Service Commission lists WIU among unaccredited institutions "from which degrees will not be accepted [...] to satisfy educational requirements indicated on job specifications."

The Texas Higher Education Coordinating Board (THECB) lists degrees awarded from WIU as "substandard," meaning according to the THECB in this case, "a degree... conferred outside the United States by an institution that the Coordinating Board determines is not the equivalent of an accredited or authorized degree." The THECB describes WIU as having "[n]o accreditation from a CB (Coordinating Board) recognized accreditor. British Virgin Islands does not have postsecondary oversight capability."

== History and locations ==
The school was founded in the mid-1990s and, as of 1998, was incorporated in Hawaii and the British Virgin Islands, although it was based in Pennsylvania and owned by Yil Karademir, of Lower Merion, Pennsylvania, who ran the university with his wife. According to The Philadelphia Inquirer, the Hawaii location was meant for forwarding mail and telephone calls to the school's location on the mainland. As of 1998 a building pictured on WIU's website was "where the head of Washington University receives mail and messages", but a two-story house on a residential street in Bryn Mawr was the school's registrar's office where a staff of four took calls from students. Karademir explained to the Inquirer that "We are entrepreneurs, we are not educators."

Before 1998, the institution now called "Washington International University" used the name "Washington University," but Karademir added "International" to the name in June 1998 as part of the settlement of a lawsuit filed by Washington University in St. Louis. Lawyers from the latter institution had accused Washington International of being "nothing more than a diploma mill", but Mr. Karademir of Washington International University disputed this characterization.

The institution's incorporation in Hawaii was dissolved March 1, 2000. Earlier, the state of Hawaii had brought legal action against the school, alleging that it had deceived consumers by failing to disclose its lack of accreditation. The parties settled the case in 1999; one of the requirements of the settlement was that Washington International dissolve its Hawaii corporation and refrain from promoting itself as being incorporated in or registered by the state of Hawaii..

According to Bears' Guide to Earning Degrees by Distance Learning, Washington International started listing a South Dakota mailing address in mid-2000. In 2002 the Argus Leader in Sioux Falls, South Dakota reported that the school had a "small, broom closet-sized office" in that city but no employees. The school used a local secretarial service to answer the telephone and forward mail, and a local lawyer as an agent. The university had a sister company, Student Communication Center, which did administrative work for the university, and the applications were forwarded to its Pennsylvania address. As of February 2008, the university began using another sister company named Washington Educational Organization in Wilmington, Delaware, and the applications were forwarded there, and the form states that the university is incorporated in the British Virgin Islands.

== Notable alumni ==
- Joseph Kabila, President of the Democratic Republic of the Congo
- Linda West, private health-care activist and political candidate in Manitoba, Canada
- Andrew K. Bashaija, Judge of the Uganda High Court, Judiciary of the Republic of Uganda, PhD in Business Administration
- Joseph Kipchirchir Boinnet, Inspector General of Police The National Police Service of Kenya, degree in International Studies and Diplomacy.
- John Panonetsa Mangudya, governor of the Reserve Bank of Zimbabwe

== Similarity of names ==
According to Bears' Guide to Earning Degrees by Distance Learning, a different institution calling itself Washington International University, stated to be registered in Delaware but using an address in Kowloon, Hong Kong, marketed itself on the Internet beginning in 2002.

== See also ==
- List of unaccredited institutions of higher learning
