= Shamim Mayanja =

African female journalist

- Other names: Zubedah Byantalo
- Citizenship: Uganda
- Occupation: Journalist
- Years active: 2012- present
- Known for: Advocating for the end of Domestic Violence through Plays
- Notable work: Namukwakula
- Television: Executive Media TV

Shamim Mayanja (born 1991) alias Zubedah Byantalo is a Ugandan journalist, comedian, actress and playwright who is the founder of Executive Media an online channel running on YouTube and TikTok.

== Career ==
Shamim started her actress journey in 2012 when she was studying journalism at Crane Media. "Zubedah Byantalo" is the name that identifies her role in the popular digital skits (Kitonsa) which have earned her popularity. She joined Streamline Entertainment which used to perform at Royal Theatre every Thursday the show which used to sell out however the cast had low monetary returns since money had to be re-invested. In 2018 she embarked on practising journalism which did not go well due to underpayment and disrespect by the media owners. She created her own online TV channel called Executive Media which runs on YouTube and TikTok.

In 2019, Shamim returned to theatre and took part in a play called Zansanze. She has written plays like Enkwe za Ssembuusi, Entegereze and Namukwakula a project based on domestic violence.

== Plays ==
Featured plays

- Kitonsa
- Zansanze

Written plays

- Enkwe za Ssembuusi
- Entegereze
- Namukwakula

== See also ==
- Stecia Mayanja
- Flavia Tumusiime
