= Ibrahim Mantu =

Nigerian politician (1947–2021)

Deputy President of the Nigerian Senate
- In office 10 August 2001 – 5 June 2007
- President: Anyim Pius Anyim; Adolphus Wabara; Ken Nnamani
- Preceded by: Haruna Abubakar
- Succeeded by: Ike Ekweremadu

Senator for Plateau Central
- In office 3 June 1999 – 5 June 2007
- Succeeded by: Satty Davies Gogwim

Personal details
- Born: 16 February 1947 Gindiri, Northern Region, British Nigeria (now in Plateau State, Nigeria)
- Died: 17 August 2021 (aged 74) Abuja, Nigeria
- Party: Peoples Democratic Party
- Education: Washington International University
- Profession: Politician

Sanata Ibrahim Nasiru Mantu (16 February 1947 – 17 August 2021) was a Nigerian politician who served as the deputy president of the Nigerian Senate from 2003 to 2007.

== Early life and education ==
Mantu was born in Chanso village, Gindiri District, Pyemland in the Northern Region of British Nigeria (now in Mangu, Plateau State, Nigeria).

Mr. Mantu holds a B.A. (Hons.) degree in Political Science from the Washington International University. He was awarded Honorary Doctorate Degrees of Federal University of Agriculture, Makurdi, University of Jos, Madonna University, Okija and University of Applied Sciences and Management Port Novo, Benin Republic.

== Career ==
=== Sales career ===
Ibrahim Mantu worked with the Public Works Department (PWD) Jos, as a stores requisition clerk from 1962 to 1963 before proceeding to the Gindiri Teachers College in 1964. He left Gindiri in 1967 and joined the Nigerian Tobacco Company, Zaria the following year as a quality controller. He moved to BEAM, a division of UAC Nigeria as a Kalamazoo specialist salesman in 1971.

=== Political career ===
Mantu first joined politics in 1998 and two years later was elected as a Deputy State Chairman of the National Party of Nigeria in Plateau State. In 1993, he became Director General of the National Republican Convention Presidential Campaign Organisation. In 1998, he was elected as the National Publicity Secretary of the United Nigeria Congress Party (now defunct) and was later elected senator on the platform of the same party. A year later, Ibrahim Mantu was re-elected as senator representing Plateau Central senatorial district on the platform of the Peoples Democratic Party.

He then served as Deputy President of the Nigerian Senate from 2003 to 2007 and was a member of the Senate of Nigeria from 1999 till 2007.

== Death ==
Mantu died from COVID-19 in August 2021. He was laid to rest on 17 August 2021 at the Sheikh Khalid Mosque in Abuja.
