= Satty Davies Gogwim =

Nigerian politician (1949–2021)

Senator for Plateau Central
- In office 5 June 2007 – 6 June 2011
- Preceded by: Ibrahim Nasiru Mantu
- Succeeded by: Joshua Dariye

Personal details
- Born: 27 July 1949
- Died: 6 April 2021 (aged 71)
- Party: Peoples Democratic Party
- Education: University of Jos
- Occupation: Politician

Satty Davies Gogwim (27 July 1949 – 6 April 2021) was a Nigerian politician who served as Senator for Plateau Central Senatorial District from 5 June 2007 to 6 June 2011. He was a member of the Peoples Democratic Party (PDP).

Gogwim obtained an advanced diploma in Accounts/Budgeting, a Diploma in Law and an advanced diploma in Law / Conflict Management at the University of Jos. He became a Finance Officer In The Nigerian Army, Administrative Officer, Audit Officer and Budget Officer.

== Political career ==
Gogwim was elected to represent Plateau Central in the Senate in the April 2007 elections on the Action Congress (AC) ticket. However, he later transferred to the PDP due to frustration with the AC national leadership. After taking his seat in the Senate, he was appointed to committees on Water Resources, Privatization, Integration & Cooperation, Industry, Independent National Electoral Commission and Drugs Narcotics Anti Corruption.

In a mid-term evaluation of Senators in May 2009, ThisDay noted that Gogwim had sponsored bills for National Visual Testing and safety Scheme, National Health Insurance Scheme Act Amendment, National Infrastructure Development Fund and Compulsory HIV Testing of Alleged Sexual Offenders, and co-sponsored other motions. He contributed well to debates in plenary while engaging himself with committee activities.

In an interview in January 2010, Gogwim talked about the ongoing dispute in Plateau State between Governor Jonah Jang and the faction led by former senator Ibrahim Mantu and ex-governor Joshua Dariye, saying all the problems in the state were in their hands. He also spoke against the proposal that politicians who left their party should automatically lose their seats, noting that when he switched to the PDP all his people had come with him and only troublemakers had stayed behind in the AC.
