= Monica Chibita =

Ugandan academic

- Born: 1963 (age 62–63); Uganda
- Citizenship: Ugandan
- Education: Makerere University (Bachelor of Arts with Education); University of Iowa (Master of Arts in Journalism); University of South Africa (Doctor of Literature and Philosophy in Communication)
- Occupations: Academic, academic administrator
- Years active: 1994–present
- Title: Professor and dean, Faculty of Journalism, Media and Communication at Uganda Christian University

Monica Balya Chibita (born 1963) is a Ugandan media professional, academic and academic administrator. She is a professor in the Faculty of Journalism, Media and Communication at Uganda Christian University.

== Background and education ==
Chibita was born in Uganda in 1963. She holds a Bachelor of Arts with Education degree, awarded by Makerere University. Her degree of Master of Arts in Journalism was awarded by the University of Iowa. She also obtained a Doctor of Literature and Philosophy in Communication from the University of South Africa in Pretoria.

== Career ==
Chibita joined Uganda Christian University (UCU) in 2012 from the Faculty of Journalism, Media and Communication at Makerere University at the rank of associate professor. She was appointed Head of Department of Mass Communications at UCU. Over the next six years, she nurtured the department into the Faculty of Journalism, Media and Communication (FJMC).

In the process of growing the department into a faculty, the following changes were effected: (a) re-naming the department of Mass Communication into the department of Journalism and Media Studies (b) creating a new department of Communication (c) hiring of new staff, including five new PhD faculty.

In May 2019, UCU promoted Chibita to the rank of full professor, in recognition of her body of work.

In May 2020, the UK top Journalism Board appointed Chibita to be part of the board becoming the second black woman to make it to the board. She is also the second Professor of Journalism in Uganda, after Prof Goretti Linda Nassanga of Makerere University.

She was elected a Fellow of the Uganda National Academy of Sciences in 2022.

== Family ==
Chibita is married to Justice Mike J. Chibita, a Justice of the Supreme Court of Uganda. Together, they are parents to five children, two daughters and three sons.

== Other considerations ==
Chibita is the Chairperson of the board of directors of the New Vision Printing and Publishing Company, the publisher of the New Vision, a Ugandan, English language daily newspaper, the African Centre for Media Excellence and World Vision Uganda.

In December 2015, she was elected to the Board of World Vision International, representing Uganda, Kenya, Tanzania, Rwanda, Somalia, Burundi, Sudan and South Sudan.

== Academic Authorship ==
Through her academic life she has contributed immensely to the discipline of communication most especially journalism through her research and below are some of her works;

- Radio in Africa: Publics, cultures, communities. This is a book she co-authored and its a collection of essays on the various roles of radio in anglophone, lusophone and francophone Africa. Some essays discuss the history of radio and its role in the culture and politics of countries such as Angola and South Africa.
- Digital Activism in Uganda. This is a book chapter in a book titled Digital Activism in the Social Media Era and it traces the historical development of digital activism in Uganda focusing on three historical moments relating to the country's governance.
- The politics of broadcasting, language policy and democracy in Uganda. This is an article in the Journal of African Media Studies that scrutinizes the interlinking between socio-political history, broadcast policy and regulation, and political involvement.
- Policing popular media in Africa is a book chapter published by Routledge and it discusses the role of the media in promoting democracy.
- Introduction: language, structure and agency: optimising media diversity in Africa using the indigenous languages. This is a book chapter It examines the role played by language in the media as a vital public domain to the extent that the languages people use in the media determine their chances of getting heard.
- Indigenous language media and freedom of expression in Uganda. This is a book chapter that explains the substantial growth in the size of programming in the indigenous languages through the broadcast range as most media owners recognize the need to be significant to local audiences.
- A multi-national validity analysis of the Personal Report of Communication Apprehension (PRCA-24). this manuscript discusses three methodological issues present in many cross-cultural communication studies that is lack of geographic diversity, reliability, and validity.
- Ugandan adolescents' sources, interpretation and evaluation of sexual content in entertainment media programming. This study sought to identify the media through which of Ugandan high school students were exposed to sexual content, how they understood it and evaluated that content and how they compared its influence with that of parents, schools and religious institutions.
- Covering migration—in Africa and Europe: results from a comparative analysis of 11 countries. This was a pilot study that out to de-westernize the discussion by examining and equating news coverage in migrants' destination countries and countries of origin. The study's focus was on media coverage of migration from Africa towards Europe.
- The relationship between parental mediation of adolescent media use and Ugandan adolescents' sexual attitudes and behaviour.
- The association between Ugandan adolescents' viewing of specific television genres and sex-related normative beliefs and behaviours.
- A multi-national validity analysis of the self-perceived communication competence scale.

== See also ==
- John Senyonyi
