= Joyce Kavuma =

Ugandan lawyer and judge (born 1974)

Honorable Lady Justice Joyce Kavuma
- Born: October 18, 1974 (age 51); Uganda
- Citizenship: Uganda
- Education: Makerere University (Bachelor of Laws); Law Development Centre (Diploma in Legal Practice); Uganda Christian University (Master of Laws in International Business); Uganda Management Institute (Master's in Management Studies)
- Occupations: Lawyer, judge
- Years active: 1999–present
- Title: Justice of the High Court of Uganda

Joyce Kavuma is a Ugandan lawyer and judge on the High Court of Uganda. She was appointed to that court by President Yoweri Museveni on 8 February 2018.

== Background and education ==
Kavuma was born on 18 October 1974. After attending local schools for her elementary education, she was admitted to Mount Saint Mary's College Namagunga, where she pursued both her O-Level and A-Level education.

She graduated from the Faculty of Law of Makerere University, Uganda's largest and oldest public university, with a Bachelor of Laws, in 1997. The following year, she was awarded a Diploma in Legal Practice by the Law Development Centre, in Kampala, Uganda's capital city. She holds a Master of Laws degree, specializing in International Business, from Uganda Christian University, in Mukono. She also earned a master's degree in Management from the Uganda Management Institute, in Kampala.

== Career ==
Kavuma started her career in 1999 as a legal officer at the Legal Aid Clinic at the Law Development Center. The following year, she was appointed as Magistrate Grade One, and was assigned to the Buganda Road Court, in Kampala.

She was moved around the country, serving in Mubende and Mukono. In 2005, she was appointed as a personal assistant to the late Laeticia Mukasa Kikonyogo (1940–2017), at that time the deputy chief Justice of uganda, serving in that capacity until 2008.

In 2008, Kavuma was promoted to the position of chief magistrate and was transferred to the Makindye Chief Magistrates Court, serving there until 2011. She worked at the Entebbe Chief Magistrates Court between 2012 and 2014.

She was appointed as acting assistant registrar at the Uganda Court of Appeal in 2015, and was concurrently deployed to the Nakawa Chief Magistrates Court. In 2016, she was appointed acting assistant registrar of mediation in the Commercial Division of the High Court.

In February 2018,Kavuma was appointed to the High Court of Uganda, one of 10 judges appointed to that court that day. As of March 2018, she was assigned to the Mbarara Circuit of the High Court.

== See also ==
- Ministry of Justice and Constitutional Affairs (Uganda)
