= Sara Mulindwa =

Media Personality

Sarah Mulindwa
- Born: Sarah Mulindwa; Kampala, Uganda
- Occupations: Media Personality, Nurse
- Presenting career
- Show: The Sex Clinic, The Sex Tester
- Station: Channel 4
- Network: Bryan Morel Publications
- Style: Health show
- Country: Uganda
- Previous shows: The Sex Tester on NTV, Uganda
- Education: Westminster Kingsway College
- Alma mater: Thames Valley University (Bachelor of Science in Adult Nursing)
- Years active: 2007–present
- Known for: Health news
- Website: Official Website

Sara Mulindwa or sometimes spelt as Sarah Mulindwa is a Ugandan-born, United Kingdom-based media personality, TV host and sexual health educator.

== Early life and education ==
She attended Westminster Kingsway College (2001– 2003) and completed with a distinction in Health and Social Care, then proceeded to Thames Valley University (2004–2007), graduated with a Bachelor of Science in Adult Nursing.

== Career ==
Between 2007 and 2012, Sarah practised as a ward nurse in Acute Medicine and from 2012, she specialized in Sexual Health and HIV. In November 2015, Sarah started to present Sexual Health and HIV education on Channel 4. In 2019, she made her debut on The sex clinic. During the covid-19 pandemic period she served as a front line nurse at Chelsea and Westminster Hospital.

== Filmography ==
Year	Film/Television	Role	Award
2017	The sex testers	Sarah Mulindwa	Reality television show.
2019–2020	The Sex clinic	Sarah Mulindwa	Reality television show
