= Sanyu Robinah Mweruka =

Ugandan journalist and news anchor

- Born: 1987 (age 38–39); Uganda
- Citizenship: Uganda
- Occupations: News anchor and television presenter
- Years active: 2010–present
- Spouse: Pascal Mweruka (m. 2010)
- Children: 5

Sanyu Robinah Mweruka (née Sanyu Robinah Nalubwama, born 1987) is a Ugandan news anchor, television presenter at Bukedde Television, a Luganda language media house which is part of the New Vision Group in Uganda.

== Education ==
Mweruka graduated from Uganda Media Consultants and Trainers (UMCAT) after specializing in radio and television production.

== Career ==
Mweruka is a news anchor of the Luganda broadcast news program Agataliiko Nfuufu and Agabutikidde. She is also a presenter of the program Omuntu Wa Bantu, and also a producer for Bukedde Television. Previously, she was a reporter on Bukedde FM, a radio station owned by the same media conglomerate. She transferred from the radio station to the television station in 2009.

== Controversy ==
In early 2015, a video began circulating on social media platforms, showing what appeared to be Mweruka in compromising positions with a man who was not her husband. The man in the video was identified as Kizito Ongom, also known as Kasumaali, a kickboxer and weightlifter. In an interview with The Observer, Ongom denied that he was the man in the video.

Mweruka also maintains that she is not the woman in the video. Her position is that her facial features were photoshopped into the video. Her husband stands by his wife and refuses to divorce her. He states that efforts were made to extort money from the couple, using that tape, as early as prior to their wedding, five years earlier.

In 2015, Mweruka released a single record called "Tonvuddemu" ("You Have Not Forsaken Me"), praising her husband for sticking with her through their marital ups and downs.

== Personal life ==
Mweruka has been married to Paschal Mweruka since May 2010. As of November 2018, they are the parents of five children.
