= Isaac Mulindwa =

Ugandan politician

- Born: 1941 (age 84–85); Ruharo, Mbarara, Uganda
- Citizenship: Uganda
- Education: Busitema University (Diploma in Agriculture)
- Occupation: Businessman
- Years active: 1955–present
- Known for: Wealth and politics
- Spouse: Safina Nnaku Mulindwa

Isaac Mulindwa is a businessman and former politician in Uganda. He is the founder and owner of Makinawa Motors Limited, an automobile dealership based in the Kololo neighborhood in Uganda's capital, Kampala.

== History ==
He was born in Ruharo Village in modern-day Mbarara Municipality, circa 1941. He is a descendant of the Baganda chiefs who went to Ankole at the invitation of the prime minister of Ankole at that time, Nuwa Mbaguta in 1886. One of Mulindwa's great-grandfathers was a "Gombolola chief (Sabawali) of Buyanja Sub-county in Igara, now Bushenyi District".

Mulindwa attended Kabwohe Muslim Primary School in 1949 and later Kibuli High School, for his high school education. He then attended Arapai Agricultural College in Soroti, which today is part of Busitema University.

In the late 1950s, Mulindwa opened a hides and skins shed at Kabwohe. He also opened a store dealing in beans, millet, maize, and coffee. In 1960, he relocated to Stanleyville in the then Belgian Congo, living there for two years. In that period, he persuaded five Congolese jazz bands to relocate to Uganda, earning a commission of between UGX:4,000 to UGX:6,000 on each band. He opened Makinawa Motors in 1964 and ran it successfully until 1980 when he was forced to go into political exile, spending five years there before returning to Uganda in 1985.

== Businesses and investments ==
He owns or controls the following businesses:

1. A coffee factory in Lukuli, Makindye Division, Kampala, opened in 1963.
2. Makinawa Motors Limited, Kololo, Kampala Central Division, opened in 1964.
3. A mixed commercial, agriculture and dairy farm in Matugga, Wakiso District.
4. A rice processing factory at the farm in Matugga.
5. A residential house in Ruharo, Mbarara, Uganda
6. A residential house in Kololo, Kampala, Uganda.

== Political career ==
In 1955, he was one of the founders of the Uganda Freedom Movement (UFM) with Augustine Kamya, Mary Nkata, and Godfrey Binaisa. UFM was at the forefront of organizing the boycott of Asian businesses and establishments, to protest discrimination and racism practiced by whites and Asians against Africans.

== Personal life ==
In 1962, Mulindwa married Safina Nnaku and together they have six children.
