= Susan Kigula =

Ugandan prison reformer (born 1980)

- Born: 1977 (age 48–49); Masaka District, Uganda
- Education: Law degree (2018)
- Occupations: Prison reformer, Activist
- Known for: Landmark death penalty case (Susan Kigula and 416 Others vs Attorney General, 2009)
- Criminal status: Formerly on death row; released in 2016

Susan Kigula (born 1977) is a Ugandan prison reformer. Her case (Susan Kigula and 416 Others vs Attorney General, 2009) resulted in changes to Ugandan law regarding the death penalty.

== Background ==
She was born in Masaka district and used to work in a small gift shop in Kampala Uganda.

Kigula was imprisoned in 2000. Along with her maid Nansamba Patience, she was accused of the murder of her partner, Constantine Sseremba. The court case hinged on the testimony of her three-year-old stepson. In 2009 she was sentenced to death by hanging.

Kigula challenged the death sentence ruling in the Supreme Court of Uganda, resulting in changes to Ugandan law regarding the death penalty. The two principal changes were: the death sentence was no longer mandatory in cases of murder, and the death sentence would be commuted to life imprisonment if the execution was not carried out within three years of sentencing. As a result of these changes, around 180 prisoners on death row had their death sentences rescinded.

In November 2011, at a retrial, Kigula's sentence was reduced to 20 years in prison. She began to study for a law degree, which she completed in 2018.

Kigula was released from prison in 2016. She maintains her innocence in regard to Sseremba's murder.
