= Gilbert Nnaji =

Nigerian politician

Gilbert Emeka Nnaji (born 18 July 1966 in Umunike, Enugu East, Nigeria) is a Nigerian politician. He is the senator representing Enugu East senatorial district in the Nigerian Senate. He was a senator of the 8th Senate of Nigeria.

He had his primary education at Community Primary School, Amoji, Nike. He then proceeded to Boys High School Awkunanaw where he did his secondary education. He then attended the University of Nigeria, Nsukka where he graduated with a B.Sc. in banking and finance.

Gilbert Nnaji began his career in politics when he became the chairman of the Enugu East Local Government from 1997 to 1998. He was again re-elected as chairman from 1999 to 2002.

Gilbert contested for the Federal House of Representatives and won in 2003. He was in the Federal house of representatives for two tenures. It is worthy to note that he was deputy house leader while at the Federal House of Representatives.
