= Lydia Mugambe =

Ugandan lawyer and convicted criminal (born 1975)

- Born: March 24, 1975 (age 51); Uganda
- Education: Makerere University (Bachelor of Laws); Law Development Centre (Diploma in Legal Practice); University of Pretoria (Master of Laws)
- Occupations: Lawyer, judge, criminal
- Title: Justice of the High Court of Uganda
- Criminal charges: Immigration & modern slavery offences, and witness intimidation
- Criminal penalty: 6 years and 4 months

Lydia Mugambe Ssali is a Ugandan lawyer. She was the Inspector General of Government on 18 September 2020 and previous UN Criminal Tribunal Judge. She previously served as a judge at the High Court of Uganda between 2013 and 2020.

In 2025, Mugambe was convicted of immigration and modern slavery offences in the United Kingdom and sentenced to six years and four months imprisonment.

== Background and education ==
Mugambe graduated from the Faculty of Law of Makerere University, Uganda's largest and oldest public university, with a Bachelor of Laws degree. She was then awarded a Diploma in Legal Practice by the Law Development Centre, in Kampala, Uganda's capital city. She also holds a Master of Laws degree from the University of Pretoria in South Africa. Mugambe was studying for a Doctor of Philosophy (DPhil) postgraduate degree in law at the University of Oxford, England, in 2024, until her arrest.

== Career ==
Mugambe was a senior magistrate in the Ugandan judiciary from 2000 to 2005, and worked in various capacities at the International Criminal Tribunal for Rwanda from 2005.

Mugambe was appointed to the High Court of Uganda by President Yoweri Museveni on 15 May 2013 until September 2020 and assigned to the Civil Division.

In January 2017, Mugambe delivered a judgement against Mulago National Referral Hospital, which had been sued by Jennifer Musimenta and her husband Micheal Mubangaizi, for the disappearance of their newborn baby. The judge found the hospital culpable of negligence and awarded the couple USh85 million (approximately US$24,000) in damages. The ruling was hailed by legal observers and non-profit organisations in Uganda as a watershed judgment towards the recognition of "the rights of poor, vulnerable and marginalized women". The ruling was nominated for the Center for Health, Human Rights and Development (CEHURD), award in 2017.

Mugambe was also appointed a Judge of the United Nations International Residual Mechanism for Criminal Tribunals on 26 May 2023, with term from 1 July 2024 to 30 June 2026, and was involved in a number of matters as a Single Judge. This is a position that she has now resigned, with the mechanism noting that Mugambe's convictions were "extremely grave matters".

Mugambe is a Columbia University fellow at Columbia's Institute for the Study of Human Rights and is an Oxford Human Rights Hub member.

She was pursuing postgraduate study in law at the University of Oxford, England, in 2024.

== Modern slavery conviction ==
On 7 August 2024 Mugambe was charged by Thames Valley Police in connection with an ongoing modern slavery investigation regarding a woman she had arranged to come to Britain from Uganda, and who she was exploiting without pay as her maid.

Mugambe claimed diplomatic immunity due to her status as a Ugandan High court judge and a United Nations judge before she was arrested—this was shown in a short BBC video—but any UN immunity she may have had was waived by the Office of the United Nations Secretary General.

In February 2025, the trial began at Oxford Crown Court. It was revealed that Mugambe participated in a "very dishonest" trade-off, involving Mugambe attempting to speak to a judge who was in charge of legal action in which John Mugerwa, Deputy High Commissioner at the Ugandan Embassy in London, was named, in exchange for Mugerwa sponsoring the woman's entry into the UK. Mugerwa had diplomatic immunity as a Ugandan diplomat and could not be charged with any offences.

In March 2025, Mugambe was convicted of one count of conspiring to facilitate the commission of a breach of UK immigration law by a non-UK national, one count of requiring a person to perform forced or compulsory labour, one count of conspiracy to intimidate a witness, and one count of arranging or facilitating travel of another person with a view to exploitation. She was sentenced in May 2025 to a term of 6 years and 4 months imprisonment, the judge noting in his sentencing remarks that she had showed absolutely no remorse and looked to blame the victim. The sentencing judge further remarked that Mugambe had been "thoroughly dishonest" in the accounts given to the police, and to the court during her trial.

== Awards and recognition ==
Mugambe won the Vera Chirwa Human Rights Award in 2019.

== See also ==
- Jane Kiggundu
- Monica Mugenyi
- Ministry of Justice and Constitutional Affairs (Uganda)
