= Ezekiel Muhanguzi =

Ugandan lawyer and judge

Honorable Ezekiel Muhanguzi
- Born: 1952 (age 73–74)
- Citizenship: Uganda
- Education: Makerere University (Bachelor of Laws); Law Development Centre (Diploma in Legal Practice)
- Occupations: Lawyer, judge
- Years active: 1977 — present
- Known for: Law
- Title: Justice of the Court of Appeal of Uganda
- Spouse: Mrs Muhanguzi

Ezekiel Muhanguzi is a Ugandan lawyer and judge, on the Court of Appeal of Uganda, which doubles as the country's Constitutional Court. He was appointed to that position by president Yoweri Museveni on 8 February 2018. Prior to his elevation to the Court of Appeal/Constitutional Court, Justice Muhanguzi served on the High Court of Uganda, retiring from there in February 2017, after attaining the mandatory retirement age (for the High Court of Uganda) of 65 years.

== Background and education ==
He was born in circa February 1952. He is a native of Nyabushozi County, in present-day Kiruhura District, in the Western Region of Uganda. Ezekiel Muhanguzi studied law at Makerere University, Uganda's largest and oldest public university, graduating with a Bachelor of Laws (LLB) degree in 1976. Later, he received a Diploma in Legal Practice, from the Law Development Centre, in Kampala, the national capital. He was then admitted to the Uganda Bar.

== Work experience ==
His last assignment at the High Court was in the International Crimes Division of the court. He served as a member of a three-judge tribunal that tried 14 men who were accused of carrying out the murders of Muslim clerics in Uganda, between 2014 and 2015. Justices Percy Tuhaise and Jane Kiggundu were the other two judges on that tribunal. He was selected to be the lead judge on that three-judge panel. He left that tribunal before that case was concluded, due to his reaching the age of retirement. He was replaced on the tribunal by Justice Wilson Kwesiga.

He previously served as the resident High Court judge in the Mbale court circuit.

== See also ==
- Supreme Court of Uganda
- Constitutional Court of Uganda
