= Jane Kiggundu =

Ugandan lawyer and judge

Honorable Jane FB Kiggundu
- Born: 1956 (age 69–70); Uganda
- Citizenship: Uganda
- Education: Makerere University (Bachelor of Laws); Law Development Centre (Diploma in Legal Practice)
- Occupations: Lawyer, judge
- Years active: 1990–present
- Title: Justice of the High Court of Uganda
- Spouse(s): (Patrick Kiggundu, married: 1988, died 2013)

Jane Kiggundu (born 1956) is a Ugandan lawyer and judge on the High Court of Uganda. She was appointed to that court by President Yoweri Museveni in May 2008.

== Background and education ==
Kiggundu graduated from the Faculty of Law of Makerere University, Uganda's largest and oldest public university, with a Bachelor of Laws degree. She then obtained a Diploma in Legal Practice from the Law Development Centre, in Kampala, Uganda's capital city. Following that, she was admitted to the Uganda Bar.

== Career ==
Beginning circa 2000, Kiggundu took up employment in the Uganda Ministry of Justice and Constitutional Affairs. Between 2003 and 2007, she served as the administrator general, in an acting capacity. She then served as the solicitor general from 2007 until 2008, also in an acting capacity.

While on the High Court, she served as the executive director of the Judicial Studies Institute, before she served in the family division of the court. As of May 2017, she was serving in the International Crimes Division of the High Court. She was a member of the three-judge tribunal that tried 14 men who were accused of carrying out the murders of Muslim clerics in Uganda, between 2014 and 2015. The other two judges on the panel were Justice Ezekiel Muhanguzi (lead judge) and Justice Percy Tuhaise (member).

== Family ==
In 1988, she married Patrick Kiggundu, a Ugandan attorney, who at one time served as the company secretary of the New Vision Group, and was a Member of Parliament for Kyotera Constituency. They had three children together. Patrick fathered another four children with other partners.

Patrick died in August 2013, after spending 15 years in a wheelchair, following injuries sustained in an automobile accident which occurred in June 1998.

== See also ==
- Ministry of Justice and Constitutional Affairs (Uganda)
