= Public Procurement and Disposal of Public Assets Authority =

Ugandan parastatal organisation

Coordinates: 00°19′34″N 32°34′38″E

- Company type: Parastatal
- Industry: Investment promotion
- Founded: 2003
- Headquarters: Kampala, Uganda
- Key people: Simeon Wanyama; Chairman; Benson Turamye; Executive Director & CEO
- Products: Public procurement regulations and guidelines, public assets disposal guidelines and regulations, SME training
- Number of employees: 70+ (2013)
- Website: Homepage

The Public Procurement and Disposal of Public Assets Authority (PPDA) is a parastatal organisation in Uganda that is responsible for regulation and supervision of procurement and disposal of government-owned property and other assets.

== Location ==
The headquarters of the PPDA are located in the PPDA URF Towers at plot 39 Nakasero Road, on Nakasero Hill, in the Central Division of Kampala, the capital and largest city of Uganda. The coordinates of the location of the organisation's headquarters are:00°19'34.0"N, 32°34'38.0"E (Latitude:0.326111; Longitude:32.577222).

== Overview ==
In 2003, the Ugandan parliament enacted the Public Procurement and Disposal of Public Assets Authority Act (PPDA Act). Following that, in February 2003, the Public Procurement and Disposal of Public Assets Authority (PPDA), was created and became operational. It is the "regulator of public procurement and disposal of public assets in Uganda".

As of March 2013, the PPDA faced challenges in the following areas: (1) At that time, the 70 employees were not enough to cater to the many services required of staff. (2) The Authority supervises procurement and disposal of assets in the central government and in all local governments across the country. However, the staffing and funding at the authority has remained static since its creation in 2003. (3) The Authority's offices are in Kampala. However, increasingly, the authority's services are needed in far-flung upcountry locations. There is difficulty in meeting the need for the authority's services upcountry, in view of limited resources in the areas of staff and funding. (4) Corruption remains a big challenge. (5) There are inadequate number of trained professionals in procurement in Uganda. The lack of experienced trained procurement officers in the districts and some central government ministries creates hardship in observing procurement regulations and guidelines.

== See also ==
- Uganda Ministry of Finance
