= High Court of Uganda =

Third-highest court in Uganda

The High Court of Uganda, also Uganda High Court, is the third-highest judicial organ in Uganda, behind the Supreme Court of Uganda and the Court of Appeal of Uganda. It has "unlimited original jurisdiction", with powers to try any case of any value or crime of any magnitude. It is also mandated to hear all appeals from all Magistrates Courts. High Court judgements are appealable to the Uganda Court of Appeal.

== Location ==
The High Court of Uganda is located at 2 The Square, in Kampala Central Division, one of the five administrative burroughs of Uganda's capital city Kampala. The geographical coordinates of the offices of the Uganda High Court are: 0°18'57.0"N, 32°34'46.0"E (Latitude:0.315833; Longitude:32.579444).

== Overview ==
The High Court of Uganda is headed by the Principal Judge (PJ), who is responsible for management of the court, including assigning duties to member justices of the court. The PJ is also responsible for supervising the Magistrates Courts below the High Court. The PJ does hear cases herself/himself at his/her discretion. The current Principal Judge of Uganda is Justice Jane Frances Abodo.

The High Court has the following eight divisions: (a) Anti-Corruption Division (b) Civil Division (c) Commercial Division (d) Criminal Division (e) Execution and Bailiffs Division (f) Family Division (g) International Crimes Division and (h) Land Division. In addition to the Kampala headquarters, the High Court has the following circuits where cases can be heard closer to the litigants' domicile.

1. Arua High Court
2. Bushenyi High Court
3. Entebbe High Court
4. Fort Portal High Court
5. Gulu High Court
6. Hoima High Court
7. Iganga High Court
8. Jinja High Court
9. Kiboga High Court
10. Kabale High Court
11. Kasese High Court
12. Lira High Court
13. Lugazi High Court
14. Luweero High Court
15. Masaka High Court
16. Masindi High Court
17. Mbarara High Court
18. Mbale High Court
19. Moroto High Court
20. Mpigi High Court
21. Mubende High Court
22. Mukono High Court
23. Rukungiri High Court
24. Soroti High Court
25. Tororo High Court
26. Wakiso High Court.

== Composition ==
The Justices of the High Court of Uganda are headed by the Principal Judge of Uganda. The following are the justices of the High Court of Uganda, as of 20 April 2026:

=== Justices in High Court Divisions and Circuits ===
The following High court justices are assigned to the divisions and circuits of the High Court of Uganda:

1. Jane Frances Abodo: Principal Judge and Head of Court
2. Lawrence Gidudu: Head of Jinja Circuit
3. Andrew Bashaija: Head of International Crimes Division
4. Emmanuel Baguma: Deputy Head of Criminal Division
5. Elizabeth Jane Alividza: Deputy Head, Land Division
6. David Batema: Resident Judge, Iganga Circuit
7. John Eudes Keitirima: Head of Family Division
8. Margaret Oguli: Deputy Head of Civil Division
9. Henry Kawesa Isabirye: Resident Judge, Tororo Circuit
10. Elizabeth Kibula Kabanda: Family Division
11. Damalie Lwanga: Land Division
12. Duncan Gaswaga: International Crimes Division
13. Winfred Nabisinde: Resident Judge, Lugazi Circuit
14. Michael Elubu: Head, Anti-Corruption Division
15. Margaret Mutonyi: Family Division
16. David Matovu: Head, Criminal Division
17. Patricia Basaza Wasswa: Land Division
18. Stephen Mubiru: Head, Mukono Circuit
19. Anna Bitature Mugenyi: Head of Commercial Division
20. Susan Okalany: Deputy Head, International Crimes Division
21. Anthony Ojok Oyuko: Head, Mpigi Circuit
22. Paul Gadenya Wolimbwa: Criminal Division
23. Alex Mackay Ajiji: Criminal Division
24. Tadeo Asiimwe: Resident Judge, Mubende Circuit
25. Olive Kazaarwe Mukwaya: Land Division
26. Joyce Kavuma: Head, Civil Division
27. Richard Wejuli Wabwire: International Crimes Division
28. Isaac Muwata: Criminal Division
29. Isah Serunkuma: Criminal Division
30. Vincent Emmy Mugabo: Head, Fort Portal Circuit
31. Phillip Odoki: Head, Gulu Circuit
32. Immaculate Busingye: Deputy Head, Family Division
33. Susan Abinyo: Deputy Head, Commercial Division
34. Jane Okuo Kajuga: Deputy Head, Anti-Corruption Division
35. Boniface Wamala: Resident Judge, Soroti Circuit
36. Jeanne Rwakakooko: Family Division
37. Victoria Nakintu Nkwanga Katamba: Head, Masaka Circuit
38. Margaret Apiny: Head, Lira Circuit
39. Tom Chemutai: Resident Judge, Moroto Circuit
40. Jessica Naiga Ayebazibwe : Family Division
41. Patience Tumusiime Rubagumya: Commercial Division.
42. Vincent Wagona: Resident Judge, Fort Portal
43. Alice Komuhangi: International Crimes Division
44. Lawrence Tweyanze: Resident Judge, Kasese Circuit
45. Samuel Emokor: Land Division
46. Flavia Nassuna Matovu: Land Division
47. Susan Kanyange: Resident Judge, Rukungiri Circuit
48. Mary Ikit: Resident Judge, Kumi Circuit
49. Christine Kaahwa: Land Division
50. Patricia Mutesi: Commercial Division
51. Bernard Namanya: Deputy Head, Civil Division
52. Patricia Kahigi Asiimwe: Commercial Division
53. Thomas Ojele Ocaya Rubanga: Commercial Division
54. Harriet Grace Magala: Resident Judge, Arua Circuit
55. Celia Nagawa: Family Division
56. Allan Paul Mbabazi Nshimye: Head, Mbarara Circuit
57. George Okello: Resident Judge, Patongo Circuit
58. Collinse Acellam: Civil Division
59. Flavia Nabakooza: Resident Judge, Eentebbe Circuit
60. Amos Kwizera: Resident Judge, Bushenyi Circuit
61. Jamson Karemera Karemani: Resident Judge, Kiboga Circuit
62. Phillip Willebrord Mwaka: Resident Judge, Kitgum Circuit
63. David Samson Lwokya Makumbi: Anti-Corruption Division
64. Christine Akello Echookit: Land Division
65. Jacqueline Mwondha: Resident Judge, Mukono Circuit
66. Rosette Comfort Kania: Criminal Division
67. Farouq Lubega: Head, Mbale Circuit

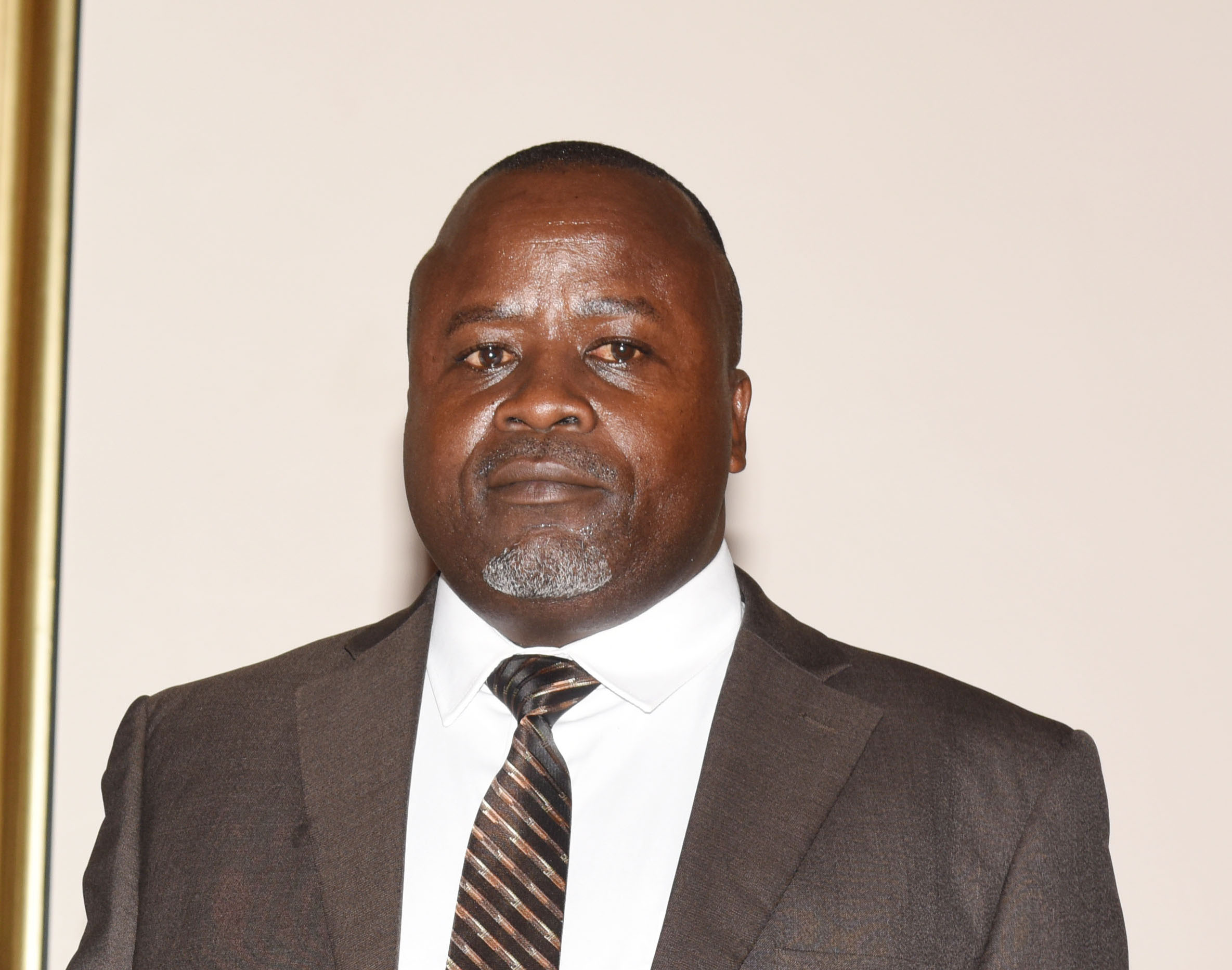
Justice Tadeo Asiimwe

=== Justices on special assignments ===
The following High Court justices are on special assignment:

1. Henry Peter Adonyo: Executive Director, Judicial Studies Institute
2. Lino Anguzu: Director of Public Prosecutions
3. Julia Sebutinde: International Court of Justice
4. Asaph Ruhundi: Chief Judge, Industrial Court
5. Linda Lillian Tumusiime Mugisha: Industrial Court
6. Benjamin Kabiito: Chairperson, Judicial Service Commission.

=== Other high court judges ===
The folowwing Uganda High Court judges are listed under "Acting Appointments.

1. Faridah Shamilah Bukirwa: Resident Judge, Luweero Circuit
2. Sarah Langa Siu: Head, Wakiso Circuit
3. Rosemary Ngabirano Bareebe: Resident Judge, Mukono Circuit
4. Mary Kaitesi Kisakye: Resident Judge, Mukono Circuit
5. Mary Babirye: Resident Judge, Masindi Circuit
6. Joanita Gertrude Bushara: Resident Judge, Jinja Circuit
7. Teko Bonny Isaac: Civil Division
8. Karoli Lwanga Sssemogerere: Resident Judge, Kabale Circuit
9. Deepa Verma: Resident Judge, Mpigi Circuit
10. Kafuuzi Gelase Kwemara: Resident Judge, Mbarara Circuit
11. Fatuma Nanziri Bwanika: Resident Judge, Masaka Circuit
12. Godfrey Himbaza: Head, Luweero Circuit
13. Simon Peter Kinobe Mutegeki: Civil Division
14. Ida Nakiganda: Land Division
15. Flavia Grace Lamuno: Resident Judge, Wakiso Circuit
16. Charles Kasibayo: Resident Judge, Mbale Circuit
17. Melody Ngwatu Ginamia: Commercial Division
18. Susan Odongo: Commercial Division
19. Lillian Alum Omara: Resident Judge, Gulu Circuit
20. Vincent Opyene: Resident Judge, Hoima Circuit
21. Andrew Khaukha: Executive Director, Judicial Training Institute.
22. Sarah Birungi Kalibbala: Resident Judge, Lira Circuit

== See also ==
- Politics of Uganda
- Supreme Court of Uganda
- Court of Appeal of Uganda
