= List of ministers of justice and constitutional affairs of Uganda =

== List of ministers of justice and constitutional affairs of Uganda ==
Since independence from the United Kingdom on 9 October 1962, Uganda has had the following ministers of justice and constitutional affairs:

No.	Name	From	To	Head of state	Notes
1	Grace Ibingira	1962	1964	Apollo Milton Obote	Ibingira was the first minister of justice and constitutional affairs of Uganda after Independence.
2	Cuthbert Joseph Obwangor	1964	1966	Apollo Milton Obote	After being Minister of Internal Affairs, Cuthbert Joseph Obwangor became Minister of Justice and Constitutional Affairs.
-	Vacant	1966	1971	Apollo Milton Obote	After Obwangor, Uganda did not have a minister of justice for the remainder of Apollo Milton Obote's first administration.
3	Peter James Nkambo Mugerwa	1971	1973	Idi Amin	
4	Godfrey Serunkuma Lule	1973	1977	Idi Amin	
5	Dani Wadada Nabudere	1979	1979	Yusuf Lule	
6	Edward Ogbal	1979	1986	Godfrey Binaisa	
6	Edward Ogbal	1979	1986	Presidential Commission of Uganda	
6	Edward Ogbal	1979	1986	Apollo Milton Obote	
7	Joseph Mulenga	1986	1989	Yoweri Museveni	
8	George Kanyeihamba	1989	1990	Yoweri Museveni	
9	Abu Mayanja	1990	1994	Yoweri Museveni	
10	Joseph Ekemu	1994	1996	Yoweri Museveni	
11	Bart Magunda Katureebe	1996	1998	Yoweri Museveni	
12	Joshua S. Mayanja-Nkangi	1998	2001	Yoweri Museveni	
13	Janat Mukwaya	2001	2003	Yoweri Museveni	Janet Mukwaya was the first woman to be the minister of justice and constitutional affairs in Uganda.
14	Amama Mbabazi	2004	2006	Yoweri Museveni	This was Mbabazi's fourth of seven ministerial positions he would hold, and this appointment earned him his moniker "Super Minister".
15	Kiddu Makubuya	2006	2011	Yoweri Museveni	
16	Kahinda Otafiire	2011	2019	Yoweri Museveni	
17	Ephraim Kamuntu	2019	2022	Yoweri Museveni	
18	Norbert Mao	2022	present	Yoweri Museveni	

== See also ==
- Ministry of Justice and Constitutional Affairs
- Cabinet of Uganda
- List of ministers of foreign affairs of Uganda
- List of ministers of internal affairs of Uganda
