= List of law firms in Uganda =

This is a list of some of the active law firms online in Uganda. It includes firms based in Uganda alone, and regional law firms that have a significant Ugandan practice. All have offices in Kampala.

== Ugandan firms ==
=== Uganda-headquartered firms include ===
This is a list of notable Ugandan-based law firms

- Aketch & Co. Advocates
- Mirembe & Co. Advocates
- Bashasha & Co Advocates
- Bwire, Kalinaki & Co. Advocates
- Byenkya, Kihika & Company Advocates
- Katende Ssempebwa & Company Advocates
- Sebalu & Lule Advocates
- A.F. Mpanga
- Kampala Associated Advocates
- Kateera & Kagumire Advocates
- Kasirye Byaruhanga and Company Advocates
- ENSafrica
- Kigozi Ssempala Mukasa Obonyo Advocates
- KTA Advocates
- Ligomarc Advocates
- Mugwisa webisa & Co. Advocates

=== International law firms in Uganda ===
International law firms that have had offices in Uganda include:

- Bowman Gilfillan
- DLA Piper
- Dentons

== See also ==
- Law Development Centre
- Uganda Law Society
- Legal practice in Uganda
- Legal education in Uganda
