= Akbar Adoko Nekyon =

Minister of Planning and Community Development
- In office 1962–1964

Minister of Information and Broadcasting
- In office 1964–1966

Minister of Agriculture, Forestry and Cooperatives
- In office 1966–1967

President of the Federation of Uganda Football Associations
- Incumbent
- Assumed office 1968

General Manager of Uganda Airlines
- In office 1986–1988

Minister of Health
- In office 1988–1990

Minister of Rehabilitation and Social Services
- In office 1990–1991

Personal details
- Born: 6 August 1931 Akokoro, Lango District, Uganda
- Died: 4 May 2018 Kampala, Uganda
- Citizenship: Ugandan
- Education: King's College, Budo; University of Kerala
- Occupation: Politician, businessman, sports administrator

Akbar Adoko Nekyon (born 6 August 1931) was a Ugandan businessman, sports administrator and politician who served in several ministerial positions in the government of President Milton Obote, including Minister of Planning and Community Development, Minister of Information and Broadcasting, and Minister of Agriculture, Forestry and Cooperatives.

== Early life and education background ==
Nekyon was born on 6 August 1931 in Akokoro, in what was then Lango District, Uganda, to Chief Jekeri Akaki and Abisagiri Koli. He was a cousin of former Ugandan President Apollo Milton Obote.

He began his education at Ibuje Primary School before joining Ngora Secondary School and later King's College Budo. He then proceeded to the University of Kerala in India, where he obtained a bachelor's degree in economics and a master's degree in political science.

== Career ==
After completing his education, Nekyon returned to Uganda and joined the colonial civil service, where he worked as a clerk and interpreter. He later became involved in Uganda's nationalist movement through the Uganda National Congress (UNC). In 1961, he was elected to the Legislative Council (LEGCO), Uganda's pre-independence legislature.

Following Uganda's independence in 1962, Nekyon became part of the country's first post-independence government under Prime Minister Milton Obote. He served as Minister of Planning and Community Development from 1962 to 1964, before becoming Minister of Information and Broadcasting from 1964 to 1966.

Nekyon served as Minister of Agriculture, Forestry and Cooperatives from 1966 to 1967. In 1968, he became president of the Federation of Uganda Football Associations (FUFA) following the renaming of the Uganda Football Association (UFA). Following the change of government in 1986, he served as General Manager of Uganda Airlines from 1986 to 1988.

From 1988 to 1990, he served as Minister of Health, and from 1990 to 1991, he served as Minister of Rehabilitation and Social Services. In addition, Nekyon was involved in the formation of the National Council of Sports in 1964 and appointed Basil Bataringaya as its first chairman. In 1965, he and Sheikh Obeid Kamulegeya established the National Association for the Advancement of Muslims (NAAM).

== Honors and achievements ==
Nekyon was honoured by the Parliament of Uganda during the 50th Independence Anniversary celebrations in 2012 as a lifetime achiever in recognition of his contributions to Uganda. In 2015, the FUFA General Assembly bestowed upon him the title of Honorary FUFA President in recognition of his historical contribution to Ugandan football.

== Death ==
Akbar Adoko Nekyon died on 4 May 2018 at Nsambya Hospital in Kampala.

== See also ==
- Grace Ibingira
- Cuthbert Joseph Obwangor
- Sam Odaka
- Basil Kiiza Bataringaya
