= Joshua Nabusoba Khaluswa Wakholi =

Minister of Public Service and Cabinet Affairs
- In office 1967 – January 1971

Member of the Parliament of Uganda
- In office 1962–1971
- Constituency: Bugisu South-West

Parliamentary Secretary Ministry of Health
- In office 1962–1965

Deputy Minister of Cooperatives
- In office May 1965 – 1967

Personal details
- Born: 1926 (age 99–100) Bugisu, Uganda
- Citizenship: Ugandan
- Party: Uganda People's Congress
- Education: Nabumali High School; Survey Training School, Entebbe
- Occupation: Politician; Public servant
- Known for: Minister of Public Service and Cabinet Affairs; Participation in the 1972 invasion of Uganda

Joshua Nabusoba Khaluswa Wakholi was a Ugandan politician and public servant who served as a member of Uganda's first post-independence Parliament and as Minister of Public Service and Cabinet Affairs in the government of Prime Minister Milton Obote.

== Early life and education ==
Wakholi was born in 1926 in the Bugisu region of eastern Uganda. He attended Bubulo Primary School before joining Nabumali High School in Mbale, where he studied from 1943 to 1948. He later trained at the Survey Training School in Entebbe from 1949 to 1953.

== Career ==
After completing his training, Wakholi joined Uganda's cooperative movement. From 1954, he worked as a co-operative assistant in the Department of Co-operative Development. He later became involved in the administration of the Bugisu District Council and eventually served as chairman of the Bugisu District Council from 1954 to 1962. He initiated the construction of Busano Health Centre and helped secure financial support from the Bugisu Cooperative Union for the construction of Teso College Aloet.

In 1956, Wakholi was elected as a councillor representing Busoba Sub-county in the Bugisu Legislative Council. Wakholi entered national politics and, in 1961, was elected to the Legislative Council (LEGCO). Following Uganda's independence in 1962, he became a member of the first Parliament of independent Uganda, representing the Bugisu South-West constituency.

He also served as Parliamentary Secretary in the Ministry of Health. In May 1965, he was appointed Deputy Minister of Cooperatives. In 1967, he became Minister of Public Service and Cabinet Affairs, a position he held until the overthrow of the Milton Obote government in January 1971.

Following the 1971 coup, Wakholi was arrested on 2 March 1971 and detained at Makindye Prison. After his release, he left Uganda for Tanzania. While in exile, he became associated with groups of Ugandan exiles preparing for an armed attempt to overthrow Idi Amin's government. He received military training and participated in preparations for the September 1972 invasion of Uganda.

Wakholi was part of the forces that attempted to invade Uganda and overthrow Amin's government in September 1972. He was captured near the Mutukula border in Rakai while retreating from the failed invasion. After his capture, Wakholi's interrogation statement was published in newspapers on 23 September 1972.

== Legacy ==
A community facility known as the Wakholi Centre was established at Nabumali in Mbale in his memory.

== See also ==
- Uganda People's Congress
- 1972 invasion of Uganda
- Basil Kiiza Bataringaya
- Felix Onama
