= Sylvia Cheptoris =

Ugandan lawyer

- Born: 1982 (age 43–44); Uganda
- Education: Makerere University (Bachelor of Laws); Law Development Centre (Diploma in Legal Practice)
- Occupations: Lawyer and corporate administrator
- Known for: Legal matters
- Title: Registrar of the Uganda Electricity Disputes Tribunal

Sylvia Cheptoris is a Ugandan lawyer and judicial officer who serves as the Registrar of the Uganda Electricity Disputes Tribunal (EDT) since August 2020. The EDT was established in 1999 by the Electricity Act of Parliament, "to hear and determine electricity related complaints" in the country, excluding criminal cases. This followed the liberalization of the power sector, ending the hitherto government monopoly enjoyed by the now defunct Uganda Electricity Board (UEB). Her position is equivalent to a Registrar of the High Court of Uganda. She reports directly to the Chief Registrar of Courts.

== Background and education ==
Cheptoris was born in Uganda circa 1982. She holds a Bachelor of Laws degree, obtained from Makerere University, Uganda's oldest and largest public university. She also holds a postgraduate Diploma in Legal Practice, awarded by the Law Development Centre, in Kampala, Uganda's capital city.

== Career ==
After graduation from the Law Development Centre, Cheptoris was admitted to the Ugandan Bar. Her first legal job was with the law firm of Mungoma Mabonga & Company Advocates, based in Kampala. She worked there as an Associate Attorney, beginning in 2008.

When she left there, Sylvia was hired as a state attorney by the Uganda Ministry of Justice and Constitutional Affairs. Over a period of just over ten years, she rose through the ranks to the title of Senior State Attorney. In August 2020, she was appointed as the substantive Registrar of the Electricity Disputes Tribunal.

== Other considerations ==
In her capacity as State Attorney, Sylvia Cheptoris represented Uganda's Attorney General before the East African Court of Justice, in Arusha, Tanzania. At that venue, before that court, she successfully defended the Government of Uganda "in several landmark cases". This work is considered one the highlights of her legal career.
