= Ministry of Justice and Constitutional Affairs (Uganda) =

Government ministry of Uganda

Coordinates: 00°18′47″N 32°35′10″E

- Coat of Arms of Uganda

Ministry overview
- Type: Ministry
- Jurisdiction: Government of Uganda
- Headquarters: 1 Parliament Avenue; Kampala, Uganda
- Ministry executive: Norbert Mao, Minister of Justice and Constitutional Affairs
- Website: Homepage

The Ministry of Justice and Constitutional Affairs is a cabinet-level government ministry of Uganda. It is responsible for the provision of "legal advice and legal services to government, its allied institutions and to the general public and to support the machinery that provides the legal framework for good governance". The ministry is headed by a cabinet minister, currently Norbert Mao.

== Location ==
The headquarters of the ministry are located at 1 Parliament Avenue, in the Central Division of Kampala, the capital and largest city of Uganda. The coordinates of the ministry headquarters are: 0°18'47.0"N, 32°35'10.0"E (Latitude:0.313056; Longitude:32.586111).

== Constitutional mandate ==
The Ministry of Justice and Constitutional Affairs is empowered to carry out the following functions:

1. To represent the government of Uganda in civil suits for and against the government
2. To carry out legal advisory services, including the drafting, perusal and clearance of contracts and treaties. It also has the authority to provide legal opinion on government borrowing
3. To draft bills and statutory instruments
4. To regulate the legal profession and legal education
5. To administer estates of the deceased, people with unsound minds and if missing persons
6. To collect non-tax revenue

== List of ministers since independence (1962-present) ==
- Grace K. Ibingira (1962-1964) [1st minister of justice]
- Cuthbert Joseph Obwangor (1964-1966)
- Peter James Nkambo Mugerwa (1971-1973)
- Godfrey Serunkuma Lule (1973-1977)
- Dani Wadada Nabudere (1979)
- Edward Ogbal (1979-1986)
- Joseph Mulenga (1986-1989)
- George Kanyeihamba (1989-1990)
- Abu Mayanja (1990-1994)
- Joseph Ekemu (1994-1996)
- Bart Magunda Katureebe (1996-1998)
- Joshua S. Mayanja-Nkangi (1998-2001)
- Janat Mukwaya (2001-2003) [1st female]
- Amama Mbabazi (2004-2006)
- Kiddu Makubuya (2005-2011)
- Kahinda Otafiire (2011- 2021)
- Norbert Mao (2022–present)

== See also ==
- Cabinet of Uganda
- Justice ministry
- List of ministers of justice and constitutional affairs of Uganda
- Parliament of Uganda
- Politics of Uganda
