= Godfrey Serunkuma Lule =

Ugandan lawyer and politician

Minister of Justice and Constitutional Affairs of Uganda
- In office 1973–1977
- President: Idi Amin
- Preceded by: Peter James Nkambo Mugerwa
- Succeeded by: Dani Wadada Nabudere

Buganda Attorney General
- In office 2005–2007
- President: Yoweri Museveni; Katikkiro of Buganda: Dan Muliika

Personal details
- Born: September 10, 1932 (age 94) Mengo, Mukono, Uganda
- Children: 7
- Education: Aggrey Memorial School, University of Mumbai
- Occupation: Lawyer, Businessman, Consultant, Politician, Teacher
- Profession: Lawyer, Minister of Justice and Constitutional Affairs of Uganda, Buganda Attorney General, Teacher

Godfrey Serunkuma Lule (born 10 September 1932) is a Ugandan lawyer. He was Minister of Justice and Constitutional Affairs of Uganda for Idi Amin and defected, becoming a prominent international critic of Amin. He went on to found the prominent Ugandan Law and Consulting firm Sebalu & Lule Advocates and Legal Consultants.

== Early life ==
Lule was born on 10 September 1932, in Mukono, Uganda. born to Buganda ethnicity.

=== Education ===
From 1952 to 1954, Lule attended Aggrey Memorial School. He worked briefly as a teacher following graduation, teaching at the Luwule Secondary School in Luwule Village in the Namaiba Parish in the Nakisunga Subcounty in the Mukono District of Uganda. From 1956 to 1961 he attended the University of Bombay, now called the University of Mumbai where he obtained a Bachelor of Laws.

=== Early career ===
After graduating from the University of Bombay, Lule served as an apprentice to the Attorney General of India at the office in Mysore, India. He then returned to Uganda in 1962 having passed the bar exam in India at this point. He passed the bar examination of Uganda in 1967.

== Career ==
Lule first entered Ugandan politics in 1963, when he began working for the State Attorney at the Ministry of Justice and Constitutional Affairs of Uganda. In 1964, he served in his first appointed position, appointed by Apollo Milton Obote to be the Assistant Administrator General in Kampala.

=== Minister of Justice and Constitutional Affairs of Uganda ===
In 1973, Idi Amin fired his Minister of Justice and Constitutional Affairs of Uganda, Peter James Nkambo Mugerwa, with the stated reason being that he could not keep up with the "supersonic speed" that President Idi Amin was driving the economy, leading him to appoint Godfrey Serunkuma Lule to be his successor.

As Minister of Justice and Constitutional Affairs of Uganda, a position that also made him the Attorney General of Uganda, Lule dealt with the complicated legal justification of the unconstitutional actions of the increasingly erratic Idi Amin. He defended the 1975 Land Reform Decree 1975, which overhauled the country's land tenure system by overturning the Public Lands Act of 1969 and eliminating all private property in Uganda and making all land in Uganda to be public land owned by the government of Uganda, with land leased to private enterprises from the government of Uganda. He also had to deal with the legal consequences the Expulsion of Asians from Uganda where Idi Amin ordered the deportation of 80,000 Ugandans of Indian Descent from Uganda, adjudicating on what happened to their property left behind when Uganda's South Asian Minority was deported and Ugandan citizens of Indian ancestry voluntarily left due to increased Indophobia in Uganda. He also frequently travelled to Geneva, Switzerland and other cities to defend the Idi Amin regime to international bodies and foreign governments.

=== Defection ===
In March 1977, Lule was told over a lunch in Kampala that Idi Amin was planning on ousting and ultimately killing Lule, prompting Lule to leave the cafe where he was leaving and head directly to London, home of a vibrant expatriate Ugandan community of other prominent defectors from Idi Amin like former long-time Idi Amin Minister of Finance Emmanuel Blayo Wakhwweya two years earlier, without even returning to his house in Kampala.

He kept a low profile in his first months in London, with news of his defection only being reported on 10 April 1977, and no mention was made in Uganda that he was missing and that he defected to the United Kingdom until July. During this time he was attempting to get his family to join him in London, avoiding the fate that other political spouses like Edith Mary Bataringaya faced when their spouses fell into the ill-will of Idi Amin, with Edith Mary Bataringaya being burned alive by Idi Amin henchmen.

In exile, Lule became a prominent critic of the Idi Amin regime. In September 1977, he spoke to the United Nations and urged them to censure Amin's crimes against humanity. He also appealed for the United Kingdom, the United States, and European nations to boycott Idi Amin and his regime, calling a press conference with ex-Minister of Health Henry Kyemba where he urged the United Kingdom to stop allowing Idi Amin's "whiskey runs" where he would send cronies on flights to London's Stansted Airport to buy luxury goods for himself and supporters. He also worked for Hoskin and Company while in exile, working in Bournemouth and London.

== Return to Uganda and Private Practice ==
In 1979, Idi Amin fled into exile moving to Jeddah, Saudi Arabia while Godfrey Serunkuma Lule returned from exile back to Uganda.

=== Sebalu & Lule ===
In 1980, Lule formed the law firm and consulting group Sebalu & Lule with Paulo Sebalu. Sebalu & Lule Advocates and Legal Consultants is a Ugandan law firm headquartered in Kampala, the capital city of Uganda. The firm is a member of DLA Piper and the DLA Piper Africa Group. The firm's advocates are members of various professional bodies, including the International Bar Association, the Commonwealth Lawyers Association, the East African Law Society and the Uganda Law Society.

Sebalu & Lule advises leading local and multinational organisations across the financial services, energy and infrastructure, insurance, telecommunications, construction, hospitality and leisure, private equity and processing/manufacturing sectors, several of whom are listed on the Uganda Securities Exchange and FTSE 100 index. The firm also acts for industry regulators, international financiers, the Government and governmental agencies.

Sebalu & Lule specialises in the following practice areas: banking and finance, capital markets, corporate and commercial law, commercial dispute resolution, projects and infrastructure, power (energy, oil and gas and mining), mergers and acquisitions, employment and pensions, non-profit organisations, real estate and tax. The firm has had significant success under Lule, who is still working as of 2019, with the firm receiving numerous awards. In the 2014 IFLR1000's financial and corporate law rankings for Sebalu & Lule indicate that it is a Tier 1 financial and corporate law firm. The firm is also ranked as a Tier 1 energy and infrastructure law firm by the same legal directory. Sebalu & Lule was also ranked as a Band 1 Ugandan law firm in the 2014 edition of Chambers & Partners.

=== Bugandan Political Career post-Amin ===
After returning to Uganda following his defection, Godfrey Serunkuma Lule initially kept a low profile politically focusing on working building up Sebalu & Lule into a successful and prominent firm. He did do pro-bono work consulting for the new Ugandan political leadership, especially working for the Indians of Uganda returning to Uganda following the Expulsion of Asians from Uganda under Idi Amin, a decision that Lule worked to defend, litigate, and sort out when he was Minister of Justice and Constitutional Affairs of Uganda.

Lule would enter Buganda politics from time to time throughout the 1990s and 2000s when the Kabaka of Buganda was close to Lule. The Kabaka of Buganda is the title given to the King of Buganda, a subnational kingdom for the Ganda People of Uganda. In 1993, he helped in negotiations to ensure that Kabaka Ronald Muwenda Mutebi II would be crowned, serving as his deputy attorney general.

In 1994–1995, Lule helped write the new Bugandan Constitution. Kabaka Ronald Muwenda Mutebi dissolved the Lukiiko in 1996 and appointed Lule to be Kampala's representative, although Lule refused to serve over the lack of transparency.

In 2005, Lule entered politics for a final time when he became the Bugandan attorney general when his long time ally Dan Muliika was appointed Katikkiro of Buganda, the title for the prime minister of the Kingdom of Buganda. After Muliika was sacked Lule resigned, citing his ailing heart. As of 2019, Lule continues to live in Kampala and practice law and run Sebalu & Lule.
