= Peter James Nkambo Mugerwa =

Ugandan lawyer and politician (1933–2020)

Minister of Justice and Constitutional Affairs of Uganda
- In office 1971–1973
- President: Idi Amin
- Preceded by: Office Vacant
- Succeeded by: Godfrey Serunkuma Lule

Chairman of the Buganda Land Board
- In office 2002–2007
- President: Yoweri Museveni
- Preceded by: James Mulwana
- Succeeded by: Martin Kasekende

Solicitor General of Uganda
- In office 1964–1971
- President: Apollo Milton Obote

Personal details
- Born: January 10, 1933 Kampala, Uganda
- Died: November 10, 2020 (aged 87) Kampala, Uganda
- Party: Non-Partisan Civil Servant
- Children: Michael Nkambo Mugerwa, Mirembe Nantongo, Margriet Sheaves, Jan Mugerwa
- Education: King's College Budo, Makerere University, University of Cambridge
- Occupation: Lawyer, Lecturer, Minister of Justice and Constitutional Affairs of Uganda, Solicitor General of Uganda
- Profession: Lawyer, Lecturer, Civil Servant

Peter James Nkambo Mugerwa (10 January 1933 – 10 November 2020) was a prominent Ugandan lawyer. He served as Uganda's Minister of Justice and Constitutional Affairs under President Idi Amin from 1971 to 1973.

== Early life ==
Peter James Nkambo Mugerwa was born in Kampala, Uganda on 10 January 1933. He is of the Buganda ethnicity.

=== Education ===
Nkambo Mugerwa attended King's College Budo for secondary school, and then went to Makerere University, where he got his undergraduate degree.

He went to Trinity College at the University of Cambridge, and was called to the Bar in 1955 at Gray's Inn.

== Career ==
Peter James Nkambo Mugerwa began his career in London, England, by working for Standard Vacuum Oil Company from 1956 to 1957. In 1962 he became a lecturer for University College, Dar es Salaam, in Tanzania, where he was a lecturer in law.

He left in 1964 to become deputy Solicitor General of Uganda, where he soon became acting Solicitor General of Uganda, a role he served in from 1964 to 1971.

In 1971 he was appointed to become the Minister of Justice and Constitutional Affairs of Uganda, by new President Idi Amin, a high-profile cabinet role he was appointed to despite his apolitical nature- Nkambo Mugerwa was a civil servant who was not a member of any political party which let him be one of the few ministers from Apolo Milton Obote's cabinet to continue as a cabinet minister or be promoted when Idi Amin staged his coup.

In 1973, Idi Amin fired his Minister of Justice and Constitutional Affairs of Uganda, Peter James Nkambo Mugerwa, with the stated reason being that he could not keep up with the "supersonic speed" that President Idi Amin was driving the economy, leading him to appoint Godfrey Serunkuma Lule to be his successor.

After he was sacked by Idi Amin, Nkambo Mugerwa entered private practice and partnered with former Buganda Attorney General Fredrick Mpanga to form Mpanga and Mugerwa Advocates. After Fredrick Mpanga's death, he partnered with Mathias Bazitya Matovu to form Mugerwa & Matovu Advocates.

Mugerwa & Matovu Advocates later changed to Mugerwa and Masembe Advocates when he partnered with Timothy Masembe Kanyerezi, Mathias Ssekatawa and Phillip Karugaba.

This partnership laid the foundation to form MMAKS Advocates, a top tier law firm in Uganda.

He retired from legal practice and mainly spent time between his farm and lakeside property in Mukono District and ranch in Kyankwazi District.

He also reentered public life when Kabaka Ronald Mutebi appointed Nkambo Mugerwa to be the chairman of the Buganda Land Board, taking over for James Mulwana who had to resign after an "operation weakened" him. He oversaw a 13-person board, including Prince David Kintu Wassajja, Kabaka Mutebi's younger brother, the Luweero district chairman, Hajji Nadduli Kibaale and Martin Kasekende, the managing director of National Housing and Construction Company. He served in this role until 2007, when Martin Kasekende replaced him.

== Personal life ==
Peter James Nkambo Mugerwa was an active member of the Uganda Mountain Club, and enjoyed mountaineering, whitewater kayaking, rock climbing, hiking, backpacking, and biking. He has two daughters in active legal practice, Fiona Nalwanga Magona a Partner at MMAKS Advocates and Alice Namuli Blazevic a Partner at Katende, Ssempebwa Advocates. His son Jan Mugerwa is based in London with Olephant Solicitors.

He has a son, Michael Nkambo Mugerwa, who is a general manager at Uganda Refinery Holding Company, a subsidiary of Uganda National Oil Company, as of the 29 May 2019.
