= Cuthbert Joseph Obwangor =

Ugandan minister and legislator

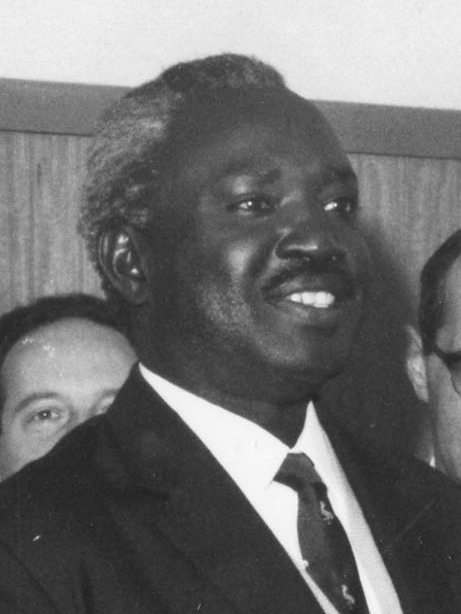
- Obwangor in 1966

Minister of Internal Affairs of Uganda
- In office 1962–1964
- President: Apollo Milton Obote
- Preceded by: Role Created (G Oda had the role during the Uganda Protectorate's transitional government)
- Succeeded by: Basil Kiiza Bataringaya

Minister of Justice and Constitutional Affairs of Uganda
- In office 1964–1966
- President: Apollo Milton Obote
- Succeeded by: Position Vacant

Minister of Commerce and Industry of Uganda
- In office May 1966 – December 1969
- President: Apollo Milton Obote

Minister of Housing and Labour
- In office February 1966 – May 1966
- President: Apollo Milton Obote

Member of the Uganda Legislative Council representing Teso
- In office 1952 – Tuesday 9 October 1962
- Constituency: Teso

Member of the Parliament of Uganda representing Teso
- In office 10 October 1962 – December 1969
- President: Apollo Milton Obote
- Constituency: Teso

Member of the Teso District Council
- In office 1952 – Tuesday 9 October 1962

Personal details
- Born: 1 November 1920 Kiiya, Omasia Parish, Magoro Sub-County, Katakwi District, Uganda
- Died: 19 May 2012 (aged 91) Omodoi, Soroti, Uganda
- Party: Kenya African National Union 1947 until 1951 Uganda National Congress 1954 until 1960 Uganda People's Congress 1960 until 1982 (the party cut ties with him when its leader Apollo Milton Obote imprisoned him between 1969 and 1971, although he rejoined the party upon his release) Democratic Party (Uganda) 1982 until 1984 Nationalist Liberal Party 1984 until 1986 National Resistance Movement 1986 until 2001 Uganda People's Congress 2001 to his death (2012)
- Spouse: Anna Maria Abura
- Children: Teresa Regina Aguti, Angela Margaret Itinot, David William Akotoi, Elizabeth Atekit, Rosemary Atim, Mary Immaculate Kwapi, Margaret Abura, Magdalene Among
- Parent(s): Aruo Nicodemus, Martha Atekit
- Education: Nyenga Seminary, Namilyango College, City College Coventry
- Occupation: Politician, minister
- Profession: Minister, politician
- Cabinet: Cabinet of Uganda

Cuthbert Joseph Obwangor (1 November 1920 – 19 May 2012) was a longtime Ugandan minister and legislator. He was a minister and a political prisoner for the Apollo Milton Obote regime after he opposed Obote's extension of power while Obwangor was a minister.

== Early life ==
Cuthbert Joseph Obwangor was born in Kiiya Village, Omasia Parish, Katakwi District, Eastern Region, Uganda on 1 November 1920. He is a member of the Iteso ethnic group.

=== Education ===
He attended Ngora Catholic Church Primary School. He later attended the Nyenga Seminary, then attended Namilyango College from 1939 to 1941, City College Coventry and the Railway Traffic School in Nairobi, Kenya from 1942 to 1946.

== Career ==
=== Business ===
After graduating from the Railway Traffic School, Obwangor worked in Kenya at the East African Railways and Harbours Corporation before returning to Uganda in 1951. He first entered politics in Kenya, when he worked for Jomo Kenyatta and the Kenya African National Union executive council. Upon his return to Teso sub-region, he became a prominent businessperson in Magoro within the Magoro market where he built and ran a restaurant.

=== Political career ===
==== Pre-Independence ====
In 1952, Obwangor entered Ugandan politics. He was elected to the Teso District Council and was elected to represent the Teso District at the Uganda Legislative Council, the precursor to the Parliament of Uganda during British colonial rule when Uganda was the Uganda Protectorate. He was a founding member of the Uganda National Congress, the first legal political party in Uganda that later merged into the Uganda People's Congress in 1960.

==== Obote Government ====
After the Independence of Uganda, the Uganda Legislative Council of the Uganda Protectorate dissolved on Tuesday 9 October 1962, being replaced on Wednesday 10 October 1962 by the independent Parliament of Uganda for the newly independent Republic of Uganda. Obwangor represented Teso again in the Parliament of Uganda. Ethnic conflict threatened to spry up after the independence of Uganda, and ethnic groups were naming kings to fight for their respective ethnic groups, and the traditionally kingless ITeso people attempted to name Obwangor as Iteso king, but Obwangor refused as he was dedicated to a multi-ethnic unified Uganda.

Obwangor was a committed member of the Uganda People's Congress, the party of President Apollo Milton Obote that emerged from the pre-independence Uganda National Congress political party. Obwangor served as the treasurer of the Uganda People's Congress from the party's creation in 1960 until 1967, during which he oversaw the finances of the construction of the Uganda House.

During the Apollo Milton Obote regime, Obwangor served in numerous ministerial positions as a part of his cabinet. When Apollo Milton Obote succeeded Benedicto Kiwanuka, Apollo Milton Obote appointed Obwangor to be Minister of Regional Affairs, which briefly assumed the responsibilities of the Ministry of Internal Affairs. Felix Kenyi Onama also can lay claim to the Minister of Interior position between 1962 and 1964, as he was Minister of Works and Labour. That role assumed some of the other responsibilities of the Minister of Interior such as leading the Ugandan National Police Force. Obwangor and Felix Kenyi Onama were succeeded in their roles in 1964 by Basil Kiiza Bataringaya, who headed the newly created Ministry of Home Affairs, later renamed to be the Ministry of Internal Affairs. Bataringaya assumed the role after he flipped parties and joined the Obote administration.

After he left the Ministry of Internal Affairs, Cuthbert Joseph Obwangor became Minister of Justice and Constitutional Affairs in 1964, succeeding Grace Ibingira. He also assumed the role of Minister of Housing and Labour in February 1966, serving in that role concurrently with being the Ugandan Minister of Justice and Constitutional Affairs. He remained as Minister of Justice and Constitutional Affairs and Minister of Housing and Labour until May 1966, when he became Minister of Commerce and Industry of Uganda.

==== Imprisonment ====
Obwangor, then minister of Commerce and Industry in Uganda, began to fall out of favor of President Apollo Milton Obote when he spoke out in favor of restraints on the presidential power in Uganda, with the following an excerpt from the journal of the Parliament of Uganda with his speech on 11 July 1967:

'I love the present President. He knows me thoroughly and I know him intimately.' He was not a machine, but even in machines there were limitations. Mr. Obwangor said that in his opinion it would be unfair to impose all the powers of the State on him. The essential factor in a modem state was the balance of power. It would be ridiculous if the Constituent Assembly vested all the powers in one man. He strongly felt that the office of Prime Minister should be created. He should be the head of government to assist the President. The creation of such an office would relieve the President and would leave him with the work pertaining to such an important office. Mr. Obwangor suggested that the principle of collective responsibility between the Cabinet Ministers and the President should be held to.

— Nelson Kasfir, The 1967 Uganda Constituent Assembly Debate: Increasing Presidential Powers, Transition, No. 33 (Oct. - Nov. 1967), pp. 52-56 (Oct. - Nov. 1967)

After this disagreement and pushback upon Apollo Milton Obote's assumption of additional powers, Obwangor was fired from his role as Minister of Commerce and Industry of Uganda. On 19 December 1969, there was an Assassination attempt on Apollo Milton Obote's life, wounding him. The assassination attempt was allegedly led by Baganda civilians. Despite this, Obwangor along with Benedicto Kiwanuka, Paul Ssemogerere, Mathias Ngobi, and others were arrested, allegedly on the orders of Basil Kiiza Bataringaya and Felix Kenyi Onama. Obwangor was arrested at his home in Soroti while he was his with his children. He was taken to Luzira Maximum Security Prison by way of Mbale, and he was imprisoned at the Luzira Maximum Security Prison. In a 2012 interview, Obwangor alleged that because he was a political prisoner, "there was no mistreatment" while he was imprisoned in Luzira Maximum Security Prison.

On 2 February 1971, the new head of state of Uganda Idi Amin released Obwangor, along with all other political prisoners in Uganda.

==== Post Imprisonment career ====
Obwangor reentered the political arena following his release, rejoining the Uganda People's Congress after the party temporarily excommunicated Obwangor after the leader of the Uganda People's Congress imprisoned Obwangor. In 1982, Obwangor shifted allegiances and joined the Democratic Party of Uganda. In 1984, Obwangor founded the Nationalist Liberal Party alongside Tiberio Okeny Atwoma, Anthony Ochaya, and Francis Bwengye. The Nationalist Liberalist Party was a splinter group from the leading opposition party at the time, the Democratic Party of Uganda. The Nationalist Liberal Party was created in response to former acting Secretary General of the Democratic Party Tiberio Okeny Atwoma's unsuccessful challenge to Paul Kawanga Ssemogerere for the leadership of the Democratic Party (Uganda).

In 1986, Obwangor left the Nationalist Liberal Party, joining the National Resistance Movement party led by the new Head of State of Uganda, Yoweri Museveni. He was appointed by Yoweri Museveni in 1989 to serve as a member of the Justice Benjamin Josses Odoki led Uganda Constitutional Commission, which was tasked with reforming the Constitution of Uganda.

In 1997, Obwangor left the National Resistance Movement, rejoining his original political party the Uganda People's Congress, although he left them after four years becoming a political independent which he remained until his death, stating in a 2007 interview that "politics is like wind, you move with the current affairs and temperature of the time".

Obwangor was also committed to improving educational services for the poor of Uganda. Between 1986 and 1990 during the Lord's Resistance Army insurgency, many members of the afflicted areas fled to the more stable town of Soroti, Obwangor's hometown. This led Obwangor to help establish a school for displaced children at Moru Apesur in Soroti Town.

== Death ==
Obwangor died on 18 May 2012 at 93 years old. He died at his daughter's, Angela Margaret Itinot's home, in Omodoi, Soroti, Uganda. Obwangor had a large state funeral that turned into a political affair. Members of the Uganda People's Congress fought with members of the National Resistance Movement at the funeral in Katakwi over who should speak, with the National Resistance Movement claiming the Uganda People's Congress neglected Obwangor in his time of need and therefore MP Olara Otunnu, a leader of the Uganda People's Congress, should be forbidden from speaking, something that resulted in brawls at the funeral until Otunnu was allowed to address the funeral.

=== Legacy ===
Obwangor House at Teso College Aloet was named in honor of Cuthbert Joseph Obwangor. The website for the school says that:

Obwangor House was named in honour of the political boss of First Teso District at the time, Cuthbert Joseph Obwangor, for his immense contribution to the development of Teso. Obwangor was the first Itesot to represent Teso district in Uganda's parliament. Obwangor House has a capacity of 128 students, and is closest to the dining hall. It has generally performed the best in sports and during inspections.

— Teso College Aloet, O-LEVEL Dormitories, Teso College Aloet: Our Infrastructure (2019)

== Personal life ==
He built his home, the Alakara House on Obwangor Road Soroti, Uganda in 1968. He lived there with his eight children and his wife, Anna Maria Abura.

Obwangor is a Catholic.
