= Edith Mary Bataringaya =

Ugandan politician (1938–1977)

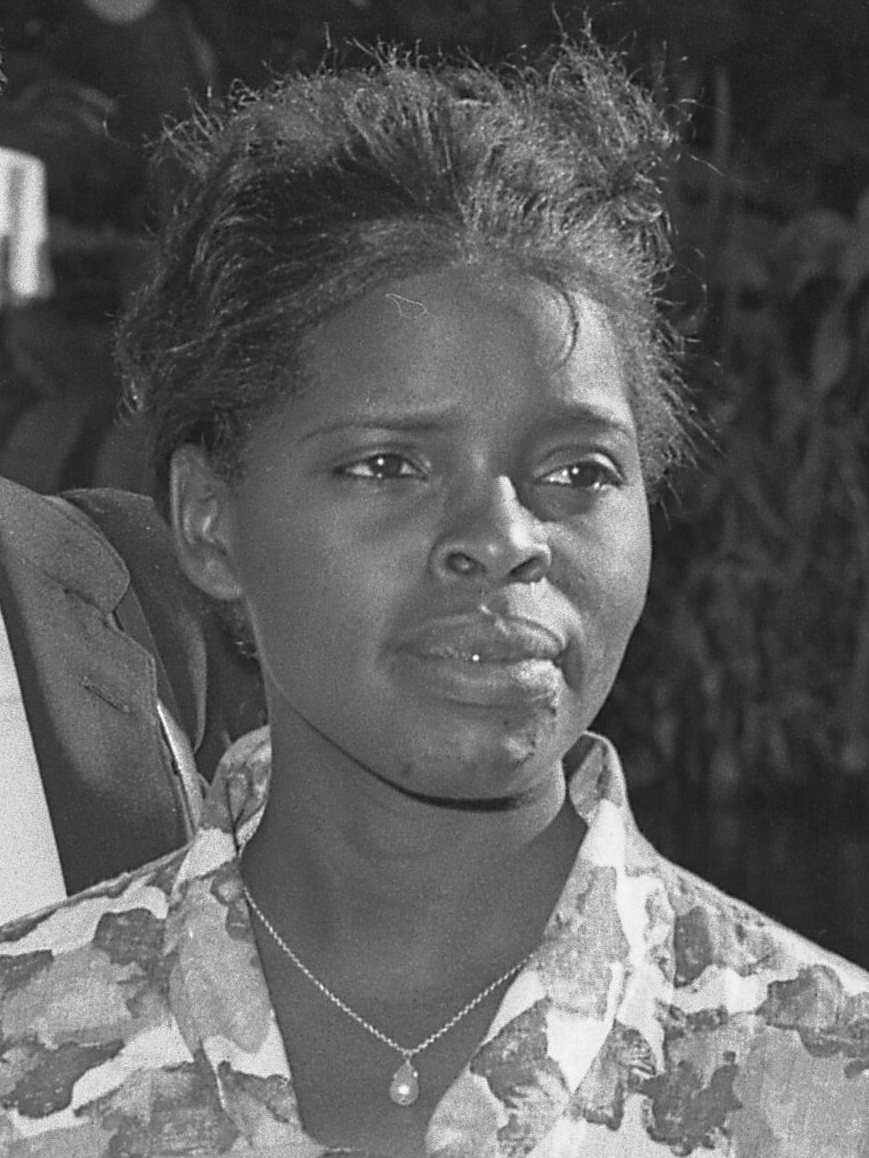
- Bataringaya in 1964
- Born: 1929; Kabale, Western Region, Uganda Protectorate
- Died: 1977 (aged 47–48); Mbarara, Uganda
- Cause of death: Execution by burning
- Resting place: Mbarara, Uganda
- Occupation: Activist
- Known for: Activism, Founding the Ugandan Women's Union and the Uganda Council of Women, Political Execution of Idi Amin, Wife of Basil Kiiza Bataringaya
- Spouse: Basil Kiiza Bataringaya
- Children: Dr. Grace Bataringaya; Kenneth Bataringaya; Winifred Bataringaya; Dr. Jacqueline Bataringaya; Janette Bataringaya; Dr. Juliet Bataringaya; Dr. Geoffrey Basil Bataringaya; Dr. Aisha Bataringaya-Sekalala
- Parent: Reverend Kaijuka of Bugongi Hill

Edith Mary Bataringaya (née Kaijuka; 1929–1977) was a Ugandan politician and activist. She was a co-founder of the Ugandan Women's Union and the Uganda Council of Women alongside Rhoda Kalema and Theresa Mbire. She was the wife of Basil Kiiza Bataringaya, the interior minister of Uganda from 1964 to 1971.

== Early life ==
Edith Mary Kaijuka was born in 1929 in Kabale, a city in the Western Region of Uganda. Her father was Reverend Kaijuka, a prominent reverend in the Church of Uganda and teacher from the neighboring village of Bugongi Hill.

== Political career ==
Edith Mary Kaijuka married Basil Kiiza Bataringaya, son of Marko Kiiza the Ssaza Chief of Bunyaruguru, and she changed her name to Edith Mary Bataringaya. At the time of their marriage, Basil Kiiza Bataringaya was attending school, at the Government Teacher Training College of Uganda (TTC) and at Makerere University in Kampala, Uganda.

Basil Kiiza Bataringaya quickly became a prominent political figure in Uganda. Bataringaya ran as a member of the Democratic Party of Uganda for the legislative seat for the Ankole District to the Uganda Legislative Council in the transitional government between the colonial-era Uganda Protectorate and the Republic of Uganda in the first Ugandan nationwide direct elections, the March 1961 Ugandan general elections. He became the Leader of Opposition during the Apollo Milton Obote regime and helped to establish the role as a check on the political leadership in Uganda. Basil Kiiza Bataringaya defected from the Democratic Party of Uganda to Apollo Milton Obote's Uganda People's Congress party on the floor of the Parliament of Uganda in the first high-profile political defection in Ugandan history. Basil Kiiza Bataringaya became the powerful Minister of Internal Affairs and quickly earned the trust of Prime Minister Apollo Milton Obote, and earned a spot in Obote's small inner circle of trusted advisors and amassed a large policy portfolio as one of the most powerful ministers in the Obote government.

Edith Mary Bataringaya became an influential figure in the Apollo Milton Obote regime following Basil Kiiza Bataringaya's defection and ascension to the role of the Minister of Internal Affairs. She frequently traveled with her husband on trips abroad representing Uganda, representing Uganda and discussing her role as the head and co-founder of the Uganda Council of Women with diplomats abroad. She most notably traveled to the United States of America and met with members of the United States Department of State in addition to visiting Disneyland.

== Activism ==
Edith Mary Bataringaya was a prominent activist in addition to the political duties she assumed as a high profile political spouse. Bataringaya started the Uganda Women's Union and the Uganda Council of Women alongside Rhoda Kalema and Theresa Mbire. In 1960, under the leadership of Bataringaya, the Uganda Council of Women passed a resolution urging that laws regarding marriage, divorce, and inheritance should be recorded in written form and publicized nationwide—a first step toward codifying customary and modern practices. During the first decade of independence, this council also pressed for legal reforms that would grant all women the right to own property and retain custody of their children if their marriages ended. The work of the Uganda Council of Women under the leadership of Bataringaya led to changes in Uganda's Divorce Laws, leading to the written codification of the Divorce Act that gives men and women equal opportunities for divorce.

== Death ==
Edith Mary Bataringaya's husband Basil Kiiza Bataringaya led an attempted arrest of Idi Amin, making him one of the first Ugandans to be detained by the new Idi Amin government. While in detention, Bataringaya was Tortured and was imprisoned in Makindye Prison. Bataringaya was then sent to the outskirts of the town of Mbarara, where he was dismembered alive. His severed head was then displayed on a pole, and paraded around the town of Mbarara until ultimately his severed head was displayed in the Mbarara barracks.

Edith Mary Bataringaya became a widow raising her eight children alone on the Bataringaya land in Mbarara, and became a prominent political opponent of Idi Amin. Bataringaya herself was executed in 1977 during a later purge by Idi Amin, allegedly at the hands of Juma Bashir, the governor of the Western Province of Uganda. Her burnt body was later found on land in Mbarara owned by the Bataringaya family. This left her eight children orphaned. They were raised by her brother, Dr. Emmanuel Kaijuka.

== Personal life ==
=== Family ===
Edith Mary and Basil Kiiza Bataringaya had eight children, Dr. Geoffrey Basil Bataringaya, Basil Bataringaya Jr., Grace Bataringaya, Kenneth Bataringaya, Jackie Bataringaya, Janette Bataringaya, Juliet Wavamunno, and Dr. Aisha Bataringaya-Ssekalala. The children were orphaned in 1977 as both parents were killed by the Amin regime. Edith Mary Bataringaya's brother, Dr. Emmanuel Kaijuka who later served as the Ugandan Commissioner of Health, raised the children since they were still young when they were orphaned by their parents' murders.

In 1985, the eight children reunited for the first time since their mother's murder in the town of Muyenga, Uganda. Their children all went on to successful careers as of 2003: Grace Bataringaya is a veterinary doctor and events manager, Kenneth Bataringaya is a businessman who manages the family estate, Jackie Bataringaya is a doctor for Action Aid working in Harare, Zimbabwe, Janette Bataringaya is working in Public Health in Boston, Massachusetts in the United States, Juliet Wavamunno (née Bataringaya) is a doctor working for the World Health Organization, and Aisha Bataringaya-Ssekalala (née Bataringaya) is studying at the University of Western Cape in South Africa.

=== Religious views ===
Bataringaya was a Catholic and involved with the Catholic Church in Uganda throughout her career in both activism and politics. Bataringaya's father was a Church of Uganda reverend, and Bataringaya was raised in the Church of Uganda. Bataringaya's husband was initially a teacher at a Catholic school in Ankole, and eventually ran all Catholic schools in Ankole before entering politics. Edith Mary Bataringaya became a Catholic after marrying Basil Kiiza Bataringaya and she worked with local Catholic ministries throughout her career, and has been listed as a friend and ally of the Catholic missions in the Mbarara Region of Uganda.
