= Monica Mugenyi =

Ugandan lawyer and judge

- Born: August 1969 (age 57); Uganda
- Education: Makerere University (Bachelor of Laws); Law Development Centre (Diploma in Legal Practice); University of Essex (Master of Laws)
- Occupations: Lawyer, judge
- Years active: 1993–present
- Title: Justice of the Supreme Court of Uganda

Monica Kalyegira Mugenyi is a Ugandan lawyer and judge, who on 17 January 2024 was appointed as a member of the Supreme Court of Uganda.

From October 2019 until January 2024, she was a member of the Uganda Court of Appeal. Prior to that, she sat on the High Court of Uganda. She was appointed to that court by president Yoweri Museveni on 17 June 2010.

== Background and education ==
Mugenyi attended Gayaza High School for her O- and A-Level studies. She graduated from the Faculty of Law of Makerere University, Uganda's largest and oldest public university, with a Bachelor of Laws, circa 1992. The following year, she was awarded a Diploma in Legal Practice by the Law Development Centre in Kampala. She also holds a Master of Laws in International Trade Law, from the University of Essex in the United Kingdom. In addition, she is a Fellow of the Chartered Institute of Arbitrators.

== Career ==
Prior to her ascension to the bench, Mugenyi was in private practice at Mugenyi & Company Advocates and had served as the manager of corporate services at the Uganda Road Fund. She also previously worked in the Office of the Attorney General and in the Privatization Unit. At the High Court, she was seconded to the East African Court of Justice (EACJ), where she served as the principal judge. In October 2019, she was named to sit on the Uganda Court of Appeal, pending approval by the Parliament of Uganda.

== See also ==
- Ministry of Justice and Constitutional Affairs (Uganda)
