= KSMO =

KSMO may refer to:

- The ICAO code for Santa Monica Airport
- KSMO (AM), a radio station (1340 AM) licensed to Salem, Missouri, United States
- KSMO-TV, a television station (channel 32, virtual 62) licensed to Kansas City, Missouri, United States
- KZDG, a radio station (1550 AM) licensed to San Mateo, California, United States, which used the call letters KSMO from 1947 to 1951
- KSMO (Uganda), a notable law firm in Uganda
