= Ugandan cricket team in Kenya in 1952 =

Ugandan national cricket team tour

The Ugandan national cricket team toured Kenya in August 1952 and played one three-day match against the Kenyan team. It was the first ever match between the two teams and part of a series of occasional matches against countries in east Africa which would eventually lead to a formal triangular tournament being introduced in 1967.

== Only match ==
22-24 August 1952
Scorecard

Kenya	v	Uganda
214 (74.4 overs); Shakoor Ahmed 59; John Wild 4/46 (21 overs)		87 (57.2 overs); John Wild 36; J.R. Jabbar 5/22 (25 overs)
190 (90.2 overs); Denis Dawson 79; John Wild 5/64 (37 overs)		63 (34.1 overs); I.W.J. MacAdam 18; Blaise D'Cunha 5/23 (8.1 overs)

Kenya won by 254 runs
Nairobi Club Ground, Nairobi

- Kenya won the toss and decided to bat
