= Kenneth Elliston Poyser =

Barrister, British Army Officer and colonial administrator (1882–1943)

Sir Kenneth Elliston Poyser D.S.O.

Attorney-General of Barbados
- In office 1925–1928
- Preceded by: Hon Sir Charles Pitcher Clarke
- Succeeded by: Ernest Allan Collymore

Attorney-General of Uganda
- In office 1928–1933
- Preceded by: Sir Sidney Solomon Abrahams
- Succeeded by: Neville Harry Turton

Chief Justice of the Federated Malay States
- In office 1939–1941
- Preceded by: Sir Roger Evans Hall
- Succeeded by: Sir Harry Herbert Trusted

Personal details
- Born: 1882
- Died: 6 June 1943 (aged 60–61) Haslemere
- Spouse: E. May
- Children: 1 daughter
- Education: Merton College, Oxford
- Occupation: Barrister, British Army Officer and colonial administrator

Military service
- Branch/service: British Army
- Years of service: 1914–1918
- Rank: Major
- Unit: Yorkshire Light Infantry; Loyal North Lancashire Regiment
- Battles/wars: World War I

Sir Kenneth Elliston Poyser (1882 – 6 June 1943) was a British barrister, British Army officer, and colonial administrator.

== Early life ==
Poyser, who was born in 1882, was the son of A.S. Poyser, barrister. He was educated at Shrewsbury School, and Merton College, Oxford. In 1906, he was called to the Bar by the Inner Temple.

== Career ==
In 1914, on the outbreak of the First World War, Poyser immediately joined up and served with the Yorkshire Light Infantry and the Loyal North Lancashire Regiment. He was mentioned three times in dispatches and awarded the D.S.O. in 1917.

After demobilisation, he began a legal career in the British Empire. In 1920, he was appointed puisne judge in the Leeward Islands. In 1925, he was appointed Attorney-General of Barbados, and in 1928 was appointed Attorney-General of Uganda, holding office until 1933. After serving as a puisne judge in Ceylon, in 1939, he was appointed Chief Justice of the Federated Malay States. In 1941, he resigned to take up the position of Legal Adviser to the Dominions and Colonial Office in succession to Sir Henry Grattan Bushe.

Poyser died on 6 June 1943 in Haslemere.

== Personal life ==
Poyser married E. May in 1918, and they had one daughter.

== Honours ==
Poyser was created a Knight Bachelor in the 1941 Birthday Honours.
