= Attorney General of Uganda =

Principal legal adviser of the Ugandan government

The Attorney General of Uganda is the principal legal adviser to the government of Uganda. The office of the attorney general is a cabinet-level government position in the country. The incumbent, Hon. Sam Mayanja, was appointed in May 2026.

== Overview ==
In the past, the office of the attorney general was combined with the Ministry of Justice and Constitutional Affairs, with one cabinet minister serving both functions. Later, the two portfolios were de-coupled and two separate cabinet ministers appointed.

== Attorneys General of Uganda (since 1962) ==
- Sam Mayanja: 2026 -
- Kiryowa Kiwanuka: 2021 - 2026
- William Byaruhanga: 2016 - 2021
- Fred Ruhindi: 2015 until 2016
- Peter Nyombi: 2011 until 2015
- Kiddu Makubuya: 2005 until 2011
- Amama Mbabazi: 2004 to 2006
- Francis Ayume: 2001 to 2004
- Bart Magunda Katureebe: 1996 to 2001
- Joseph Kalias Ekemu: 1994 to 1996
- Abu Mayanja: 1991 to 1994
- George William Kanyeihamba: 1988 to 1991
- Joseph Mulenga: 1986 to 1988
- Sam Kutesa: 1985 to 1986
- Stephen Amoding Ariko: 1979 to 1985
- George William Kanyeihamba: 1979
- Mathia Bazitya Matovu: 1977 to 1979
- Godfrey Lule: 1974 to 1977
- Peter James Nkambo Mugerwa: 1971 to 1974
- Lameck Lubowa: 1967 to 1971
- Godfrey Binaisa: 1962 to 1967

== Attorneys General of Uganda (prior to independence in 1962) ==
- Ralph Leonard Emmanuel Dreschfield: 1951 to 1962
- Sir Guy Wilmot McLintock Henderson: 1948 to 1951
- James Reali Gregg: 1943 to 1947
- Major-General Sir Ralph Hone: 1937 to 1943
- Neville Harry Turton: 1933 to 1936
- Sir Kenneth Elliston Poyser: 1928 to 1933
- Sir Sidney Solomon Abrahams: 1925 to 1928
- Hon. Alan Frederick Hogg: 1918 to 1924
- Sir Donald Kingdon: 1912 to 1918
- Sir Alison Russell: 1906 to 1912

== See also ==
- Attorney general
- Politics of Uganda
- Cabinet of Uganda
