= Kampala Associated Advocates =

International law firm based in Uganda

Coordinates: 00°19′38″N 32°34′37″E

- Headquarters: 41 Nakasero Road; Kampala, Uganda
- No. of lawyers: 26 (2020)
- No. of employees: 40+ (2020)
- Major practice areas: Commercial Litigation and Arbitration, Telecommunications Media and Technology, Energy and Natural Resources, Tax Law, Corporate Advisory, Employment and Labour, Intellectual Property, Banking and Finance.
- Key people: Joseph Matsiko (Managing Partner) Elly Karuhanga, Peter Kabatsi, Sam Mayanja, Oscar Kambona, Kallu Kalumiya, Bruce Musinguzi, John Jet Tumwebaze, Augustine Obilil Idoot, Elison Karuhanga & Zulaika Kasaija
- Date founded: 2001 (age 23–24)
- Company type: Partnership
- Website: Homepage

Kampala Associated Advocates (KAA) is an international law firm based in Uganda with a presence in the countries of the African Great Lakes. The firm specializes in a range of legal issues from litigation to corporate matters. KAA has 26 lawyers, of whom 15 are partners, two senior consultants and 15 support staff, making it one of the largest legal practices in Uganda.

== Location ==
The offices of the law firm are located at 41 Nakasero Road, on Nakasero Hill, in Kampala Central Division, in the central business district of Kampala, Uganda's capital and largest city. The geographical coordinates of the firm's chambers are: 0°19'38.0"N, 32°34'37.0"E (Latitude:0.327223; Longitude:32.576935).

== Overview ==
The firm is one of the largest law firms in Uganda, with more than 40 employees. As a leading law firm, in one of Sub-Saharan Africa's most dynamic economies in the energy and infrastructure arenas, the law firm is involved in the following areas, among others. (a) Media and Broadcasting (b) Banking and Finance (c) Communications (d) Capital markets (e) Dispute Resolution (f) Energy, and Infrastructure (g) Mergers and acquisitions and (h) Mining.

== History ==
KAA was founded in 2001, by Elly Kurahanga, who also doubles as the Chairman of Uganda Chamber of Mines and Petroleum. Elly Karuhanga also serves as the Chairman of DFCU Bank, the second-largest commercial bank in Uganda, with total assets valued at US$975 million, as of 31 January 2017. Joseph Matsiko serves as the Managing Partner of Kampala Associated Advocates.

== Partnerships ==
KAA has several global partnerships with various leading International law firms.

== Cases ==
Some of the notable court cases in which KAA has been involved include the following: (1) KAA represented MTN Uganda in the tax evasion case against 13 of its top directors in February 2013. (2) KAA represented Tullow Oil in its Value-added tax dispute with the Ugandan government, filed at the International Centre for Settlement of Investment Disputes. (3) KAA defended Ugandan President Yoweri Museveni in his 2011 court case against Ugandan journalist Dr Jesse Mashate, who accused the president of causing him loss of business.

== See also ==
- List of law firms in Uganda
