= Crescent Baguma =

Ugandan businessman and entrepreneur (1960-2015)

- Born: 13 June 1960; Fort Portal, Uganda
- Died: 17 December 2015 (aged 55); Kyegegwa, Uganda
- Citizenship: Uganda
- Education: St. Leo's College, Kyegobe (UCE & UACE)
- Occupation: Businessman
- Years active: 1981–2015

Crescent Baguma, also known as Amooti Crescent Baguma and Baguma Crescent Rusoke, (30 June 1960 – 17 December 2015) was a businessman in Uganda. He reportedly was one of the wealthiest individuals in that country in 2012.

== Background and education ==
He was born to Acaali Simon Kalenzi and Akiiki Teresa Matama. He attended St. Mary's Demonstration School in Kinyamasika, about 5 kilometres (3 mi), by road, south of downtown Fort Portal, from Primary 1 to Primary 4. He relocated to Ibanda Demonstration School, in Ibanda, Ibanda District for his Primary 5 to Primary 7. He then returned to Fort Portal for middle and high school at St. Leo's College, Kyegobe.

== Investments and businesses ==
In 2000, Baguma started a construction company with his wife which they named BCR General Limited (BCR). BCR has three divisions; (a) road construction (b) building construction and (c) manufacture of building tiles. The company has in the past worked for the Uganda National Roads Authority, the Uganda Ministry of Defence and MTN Uganda.

== Personal life ==
Baguma met Dorothy Mwirumubi in 1983 and they got married in 1989. Together, they had six children; Eileen, Emmanuella, Isingoma, Kato, Sylvia, and Ronald. On the night of 17 December 2015, the vehicle he was traveling in was involved in an accident. His vehicle veered off the road and crashed at Kyegegwa. He died instantly.
