= Joseph Mulenga =

Joseph Nyamihana Mulenga
- Born: 1940; Uganda
- Died: 29 August 2012 (aged 71–72)
- Education: University of London
- Occupations: Lawyer, Judge, Politician
- Title: Justice of the Supreme Court of Uganda, President of the East African Court of Justice
- Political party: Democratic Party of Uganda

Joseph Nyamihana Mulenga (died 29 August 2012) was a Ugandan judge. He served as Justice of the Supreme Court of Uganda for twelve years between 1997 and 2009, and was a judge and later President of the East African Court of Justice. Mulenga died in August 2012.

== Early life and education ==
Justice Mulenga was born in the former Kigezi District, attended Mutolere and Sooko for his Primary education, St. Mary’s College Rushoroza, in Kabale District, St. Leo’s College Kyegobe in Fort Portal and St. Mary’s College Kisubi. In 1960, he obtained his Higher School Certificate in 1960. He undertook his legal education in the United Kingdom, where he graduated with a Bachelor of Laws from the University of London in 1965. He was called to the English Bar as Barrister-at-Law by the Middle Temple in 1966.

For fourteen years, Mulenga was National Deputy Chairman of the Democratic Party of Uganda.

== Career ==
In the years between 1986 and 1989 he was Minister of Justice and Attorney General, he later was Minister for Regional Co-operation. In 1997 he became a member of the Supreme Court of Uganda where he would serve for twelve years. He also became a judge of the East African Court of Justice where he would become president. He later started working on a part-time basis for the African Court on Human and Peoples' Rights. In 2001, Justice Mulenga was one of the two Judges of the Supreme Court who nullified a petition brought to court by Kizza Besigye against Yoweri Museveni for vote rigging. He was elected a judge of the African Court in 2008 for a term of six. His practiced law for 47 years, contributing significantly to the legal professional in Uganda.

== Death ==
Joseph died on 29 August 2012 at Nakasero Hospital in Kampala due to cancer related complication.

== See also ==
- Monica Mugenyi
- George Kanyeihamba
- Josephine Abaijah
- Kiryowa Kiwanuka
- Sam Kutesa
- Kigezi District, former district in Western Uganda
- kabale District, a district in South Western Uganda
