= Basil Kiiza Bataringaya =

Ugandan politician

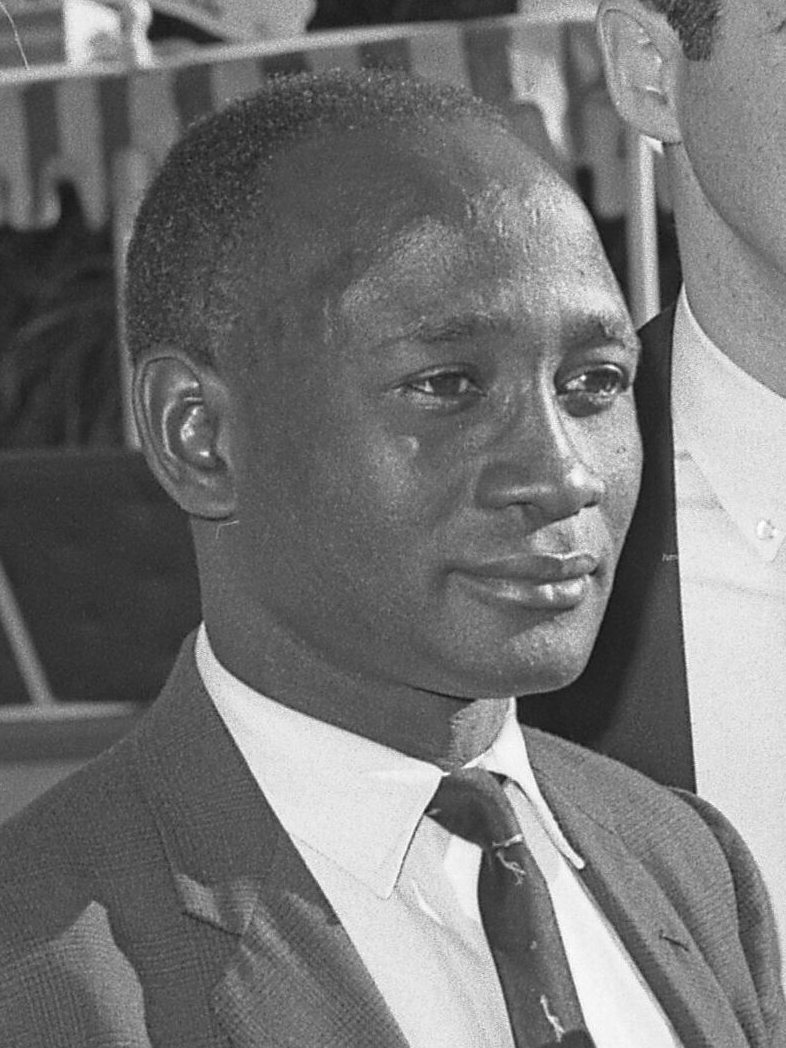
- Bataringaya in 1964

Leader of Opposition (Uganda)
- In office April 1962 – 31 December 1964
- Prime Minister: Apollo Milton Obote
- Preceded by: Apollo Milton Obote
- Succeeded by: Alex Latim
- Constituency: Bushenyi District

Minister of Internal Affairs of Uganda
- In office 31 December 1964 – 25 January 1971
- President: Apollo Milton Obote
- Succeeded by: Lt. Col. Ernest Obitre Gama

Personal details
- Born: 1927 Kantojo, Igara County, Bushenyi District, Uganda Protectorate
- Died: 18 September 1972 (aged 45) Mbarara, Mbarara District, Uganda
- Party: Democratic Party (Uganda) 1954 – 31 December 1964 Uganda People's Congress 31 December 1964 – 18 September 1972 (Death)
- Spouse: Edith Mary Bataringaya
- Education: Makerere University, St. Leo's College, Kyegobe
- Occupation: Politician, Leader of the Opposition
- Profession: Teacher, Member of the Parliament of Uganda, Minister, Leader of Opposition (Uganda)

Basil Kiiza Bataringaya (1927 – 18 September 1972) was a Ugandan politician and statesman who served as the interior minister of Uganda from 1964 to 1971. He was the Leader of the Opposition at the beginning of the Milton Obote's government, but changed parties and was appointed to the powerful role of Minister of Internal Affairs by Obote. He was imprisoned, tortured, and was one of the first political prisoners to be executed by Idi Amin's regime.

== Early life ==
=== Birth ===
Basil Kiiza Bataringaya was born in 1927, in the county of Igara, in Bushenyi District of the Ugandan Protectorate. His father was Marko Kiiza, who was the Ssaza Chief of Bunyaruguru at the time. A Ssaza was the equivalent of a county in the newly created administration divisions after the absorption of the Ankole Kingdom in to the British Protectorate of Uganda, as a part of the Ankole Agreement of 1901. The Ankole Agreement set the boundaries of the Bunyaruguru Ssaza as "On the north-west by the Dweru Channel; on the east by the Chambura River, the recognized Bunyaruguru-lgara and Kamsura-Igara boundaries; on the south by the Rwenchwera River; on the west by Lake Albert, and gave Bataringaya's father a powerful position in southwestern Uganda during the early 20th century.

=== Education ===
Bataringaya attended St. Leo's College, Kyegobe, a residential boys' secondary school of Catholic curriculum, located in Fort Portal, Kabarole District in the Western Region of Uganda from 1945 to 1947. He then attended the Government Teacher Training College of Uganda (TTC) from 1948 to 1949. He then attended Makerere University, Uganda's top university, from 1953 to 1956. It was at Makerere University that Bataringaya began his political career, becoming the University College Guild president for the 1955 to 1956 term.

=== Teaching career ===
After graduating from Makerere University, Bataringaya became a secondary school teacher. He taught at Ntare Secondary School, a residential single-sex all boy's secondary school located in Mbarara, Mbarara District, Uganda. He then became the school supervisor of the Ankole Catholic schools from 1959 to 1961, when he was first elected to the Parliament of Uganda.

== Political career ==
=== Transitional government ===
Bataringaya ran as a member of the Democratic Party of Uganda for the legislative seat for the Ankole District to the Uganda Legislative Council in the transitional government between the colonial-era Uganda Protectorate and the Republic of Uganda in the first Ugandan nationwide direct elections, the March 1961 Ugandan general elections. Bataringaya quickly became popular within the Democratic Party of Uganda that controlled government following its win of 44 of the 82 contested seats, and Bataringaya was appointed to be the first Minister of Local Government for Uganda's first post-colonial independent government under Benedicto Kiwanuka.

=== Leader of the Opposition ===
Following agreements made by 48 Ugandan representatives, including prominent Ugandan politician A.G. Mehta, at a September 1961 Constitutional Convention meeting in London, England, the Ugandan Legislative Council of the transitional government between the colonial-era Uganda Protectorate and the Republic of Uganda became the Parliament of Uganda, which was then formally dissolved so that the 1962 Ugandan general election could occur on 25 April 1962, the first elections held under an entirely independent Ugandan government. Bataringaya ran again as a member of the Democratic Party of Uganda in his Ankole constituency and was reelected. Bataringaya lost his ministerial positions as a result of the election, as the Ugandan People's Congress won 37 of the 82 seats and formed an alliance with the Kabaka Yekka party that won 21 of 82 seats, giving this new alliance 58 of the 82 seats in the Parliament of Uganda, taking control away from the Democratic Party of Uganda who won 24 of the 82 seats and became the official party of the opposition.

Bataringaya was elected Secretary General of the Democratic Party of Uganda in 1961, and became the second most powerful member of the Democratic Party after the Prime Minister of the transitional government between the colonial-era Uganda Protectorate and the Republic of Uganda, Benedicto Kiwanuka. Benedicto Kiwanuka did not run for the Parliament of Uganda in the 1962 Ugandan general election and thus was ineligible for any parliamentarian positions in the first government of the Republic of Uganda. As the highest-ranking member of the Democratic Party of Uganda still in the Parliament of Uganda, Bataringaya became the second ever Leader of the Ugandan Opposition, replacing newly elected prime minister Apollo Milton Obote, and the first ever Ugandan Opposition Leader of the new Republic of Uganda.

As Opposition Leader, Bataringaya worked as the chief representative of the Democratic Party of Uganda which was operating as the resistance to the Apollo Milton Obote regime and the joint Ugandan People's Congress and Kabaka Yekka government. Bataringaya had little power as opposition leader, but worked during his tenure as Leader of the Ugandan Opposition to protect opposition MPs from censorship, arrest, and violence. His most significant act was to protect Democratic Party MP Vincent Rwamwaro of the Toro East constituency from an arrest that Bataringaya described as a political arrest. On 16 August 1962, MP Vincent Rwamwaro was arrested in his home at 6:20 am, tied with rope, thrown in the back of a pick-up truck, and sent in only his underwear and sandals before a magistrate in the court in Nakawa on charges of failing to pay his graduation tax, a charge Rwamwaro denied. In both the 19 September 1962 and 26 September 1962 sessions of the Parliament of Uganda, Bataringaya gave lengthy speeches describing the value of opposition in government, decrying threats against the opposition, and attacking both the manner and political nature of the arrest of MP Rwamwaro.

=== Party-switch and Obote Government ===
==== Defection ====
During Bataringaya's time as Secretary General of the Democratic Party of Uganda and as the Leader of the Opposition and the highest ranking Democratic Party member in government, he clashed frequently with party leader and former Prime Minister Benedicto Kiwanuka. Bataringaya reportedly saw Benedicto Kiwanuka as arrogant and as an obstacle to the Democratic Party of Uganda and their efforts to re-obtain control as the majority party in the Parliament of Uganda. Bataringaya attempted an intra-party coup and had the top-ruling committee of the Democratic Party call for Kiwanuka to step down, but in the subsequent internal elections Kiwanuka won and retained control of the Democratic Party of Uganda, further exacerbating the conflict between the two men.

This conflict between Basil Kiiza Bataringaya and Benedicto Kiwanuka ultimately led to Bataringaya crossing the aisle along with five other Democratic Party MPs and joining the Ugandan People's Congress, in the first high-profile party-switching in Ugandan history. In addition to the conflict between Bataringaya and Benedicto Kiwanuka within the Democratic Party of Uganda, Bataringaya's moderate political beliefs, nationalism, and desire to serve his country more efficiently have also all been cited as reasons for his decision to defect from the Democratic Party of Uganda.

==== Minister of Internal Affairs ====
After Bataringaya's high-profile defection from the Democratic Party of Uganda to the Ugandan People's Congress, Bataringaya was rewarded by the leader of the Ugandan People's Congress Prime Minister Apollo Milton Obote and appointed to be the new Minister of Internal Affairs of Uganda.

Bataringaya quickly earned the trust of Prime Minister Apollo Milton Obote, and earned a spot in Obote's small inner circle of trusted advisors and amassed a large policy portfolio as one of the most powerful ministers in the Obote government. Bataringaya traveled internationally, representing Uganda on a tour of the United States and visiting Disneyland in Anaheim, California with his wife Edith Mary Bataringaya who headed the Ugandan Council for Women. He also represented the Ugandan government to the media of the world following the kidnapping of Brian Lea, a British diplomat who was kidnapped in Uganda in 1970. As a high-profile Catholic involved in the administration, Bataringaya also served as a liaison between the Catholic Church of Uganda and the Obote regime, helping open Catholic hospitals and Catholic schools throughout Uganda.

Also as one of Obote's five most trusted ministers, Bataringaya was in charge of putting out numerous crises throughout his tenure as Minister of Internal Affairs. One such crisis was the 1966 Buganda Crisis, where Ugandan troops commanded by Idi Amin attacked Lubiri and exiled the Kabaka of Buganda, Mutesa II of Buganda, after the Buganda regional parliament voted to suspend Buganda's incorporation into Uganda, thus leading to Obote and Bataringaya reunifying Uganda by force and sending Mutesa II of Buganda into exile in the United Kingdom via Burundi. This use of troops was criticized and faced resistance, and Bataringaya took much of the blame as the implementer of the crisis and the killer of several other Buganda Kabaka loyalists.

=== Idi Amin and downfall ===
==== Attempted Arrest of Amin ====
Idi Amin, the Ugandan military official who eventually led a successful coup d'état against the Apollo Milton Obote government and became the third President of Uganda, was the eventual undoing of Basil Kiiza Bataringaya's political career and ultimately his life. A rift developed between Idi Amin and President Apollo Milton Obote that was exacerbated by Idi Amin's involvement in the First Sudanese Civil War from Idi Amin's base in the West Nile region of Uganda and Amin's alleged support for an attempted 1969 assassination attempt on Obote, a rift that ultimately led to Obote demoting Amin from his role as commander of all the armed forces of Uganda to the commander of the Army of Uganda.

Idi Amin was seen as a threat to the Obote government, and Apollo Milton Obote had Basil Kiiza Bataringaya put in charge of the last minute attempted covert arrest of Amin. President Obote went to a January 1971 conference with British Conservative Prime Minister Edward Heath alongside other African leaders like President Julius Nyerere of Tanzania and President Kenneth Kaunda of Zambia to discourage Prime Minister Heath from lifting the ban that the United Kingdom had on selling arms to the apartheid government of South Africa. While there, Obote learned about another attempt on his life by Amin, and tasked Basil Bataringaya to lead an 'assassination' committee that ultimately set out to arrest Amin. On 24 January 1971 Bataringaya attempted to use the Ugandan National Police to storm Amin's Command Post at Kololo in Kampala and arrest Amin on charges related to the assassination attempt and a 1969 court martial for misappropriating military funds. Amin learned about this plan through spies within the Obote government, and then launched his coup d'état that night, overthrowing the Obote regime on 25 January 1971 and detaining Bataringaya.

==== Arrest and detention ====
Bataringaya was one of the first Ugandans to be detained by the new Idi Amin government. In the week after Idi Amin's coup d'état, Amin dismissed all of the ministers of Obote government but did not immediately imprison anybody except for Bataringaya. On 28 January 1971, three days after the coup d'état, Idi Amin brought fifty-five political prisoners imprisoned by the Apollo Milton Obote government to the Entebbe International Airport and freed them, while also bringing Bataringaya to the event in an army Jeep under armed guard, and was the only political prisoner not freed despite Amin's comment that "you need not fear for your safety since the new government is more interested in uniting Ugandans than anything else". Bataringaya was personally interrogated by Amin, where he likely revealed the other officers working to arrest Amin on 24 January 1971.

== Death ==
While in detention, Bataringaya was tortured and was imprisoned in Makindye Prison. Bataringaya was then sent to the outskirts of the town of Mbarara, where he was dismembered alive. His severed head was then fixed on a pole, and paraded around the town of Mbarara until it was ultimately displayed in the Mbarara barracks. A photograph of Amin's soldiers leading Bataringaya on a military Jeep to his execution was taken and circulated, one of the few photographs still existing that show proof of Idi Amin executing political opponents.

Immediately after Bataringaya was executed, his loyal cabal of associates were executed as well, including Tibayunga, Katuramu, Rubashoka, Bekunda, Kanyonyore, Kibeherere, Rukare, Bitarisha, Kabaterine, Kanisi, and Marengane. Edith Mary Bataringaya, Bataringaya's wife and former head of the Uganda Council of Women, was executed in 1977 during a later purge by Idi Amin, allegedly at the hands of Juma Bashir, the governor of the Western Province of Uganda. Her burnt body was later found on land in Mbarara owned by the Bataringaya family.

== Family and personal life ==
=== Marriage to Edith Mary Bataringaya ===
Basil Kiiza Bataringaya married Edith Mary Bataringaya, who took an active role in his life and the Ugandan political scene. Edith Mary Bataringaya was born Edith Mary Kaijuka in the town of Kabale in the Western Region of the Ugandan Protectorate, and was the daughter of Reverend Kaijuka of Bugongi Hill. Edith Mary Bataringaya traveled frequently with her husband on his international trips representing Uganda abroad, traveling to the United States with him. Edith Mary Bataringaya also started the Uganda Women's Union and the Uganda Council of Women alongside Rhoda Kalema and Theresa Mbire. Edith Mary Bataringaya continued her husband's work with the Catholic Church in Uganda after Basil Kiiza Bataringaya's murder. Edith Mary Bataringaya was ultimately burned alive and executed by the Amin government, allegedly at the hands of Juma Bashir the Governor of the Western Province of Uganda.

=== Family ===
Basil Kiiza and Edith Mary Bataringaya had eight children, Dr. Grace Bataringaya, Kenneth Bataringaya, Winifred Bataringaya, Dr. Jacqueline Bataringaya, Janette Bataringaya, Dr. Juliet Bataringaya, Dr. Geoffrey Basil Bataringaya and Dr. Aisha Bataringaya-Sekalala. The children were orphaned in 1977 as both parents were killed by the Amin regime. Edith Mary Bataringaya's brother, Dr. Emmanuel Kaijuka who later served as the Ugandan Commissioner of Health, raised the children who were still young when they were orphaned following their parents' murders. In 1985, the eight children reunited for the first time since their mother's murder in the town of Muyenga, Uganda. Their children all went on to successful careers as of 2003: Grace Bataringaya is a veterinary doctor and events manager, Kenneth Bataringaya is a businessman who manages the family estate, Dr. Jacqueline Bataringaya is a doctor for Action Aid working in Harare, Zimbabwe, Janette Bataringaya is working in Public Health in Boston, Massachusetts in the United States, Dr. Juliet Bataringaya is a doctor working for the World Health Organization, and Dr. Aisha Bataringaya-Sekalala (née Bataringaya) was studying at the University of Western Cape in South Africa.

=== Religious views ===
Bataringaya was a Catholic and involved with the Catholic Church in Uganda throughout his career in both academia and politics. Bataringaya attended a Catholic school at St. Leo's College, Kyegobe in Tooro, and eventually ran all Catholic schools in Ankole before entering politics. Bataringaya also acted as a liaison between the Catholic Church in Uganda and the Uganda government as well, working with the Catholic Church in Uganda to build schools and hospitals throughout Uganda.
