= Roger Evans Hall =

British barrister and colonial judge (1888-1969)

Sir Roger Evans Hall CBE

Chief Justice of the Protectorate of Uganda
- In office 1935–1937
- Preceded by: Sir Sidney Abrahams
- Succeeded by: Sir Norman Whitley

Chief Justice of the Federated Malay States
- In office 1938–1939
- Preceded by: Sir Samuel Joyce Thomas
- Succeeded by: Kenneth Elliston Poyser

Personal details
- Born: 16 April 1888
- Died: 6 February 1969 (aged 80) Pembroke Parish, Bermuda
- Education: New College, Oxford
- Occupation: Barrister and senior colonial judge

Sir Roger Evans Hall CBE (16 April 1888 – 6 February 1969) was a British barrister and colonial judge who served as Chief Justice of the Federated Malay States and the Protectorate of Uganda during the 1930s.

== Early life and education ==
Hall was born on 16 April 1888. He was educated at Winchester College and New College, Oxford, and was called to the Bar of the Inner Temple in 1908.

== Career ==
Hall went to the Gold Coast where in turn he served as District Commissioner, 1910; Crown Counsel, 1914; Senior Crown Counsel, 1915; Circuit Judge Ashanti and Northern Territories of Gold Coast, 1918; and Puisne Judge, 1921.

He served as Judge of the High Court, Northern Rhodesia in 1931, and was appointed Acting Governor, Northern Rhodesia in 1934. From 1935 to 1937, he served as Chief Justice of the Protectorate of Uganda, and from 1938 to 1939, he served as Chief Justice of the Federated Malay States. He then went to Bermuda where he acted in various capacities, including from 1941 to 1945 in the High Court of Admiralty, Prize Court, and was awarded the CBE for public services in 1955.

== Personal life and death ==
Hall married Adelaide Trimingham in 1944. He died in Pembroke Parish, Bermuda on 6 February 1969.

== Honours ==
Hall was created a Knight Bachelor in the 1937 New Years Honours. He was awarded Commander of the Order of the British Empire (CBE) in the 1955 Birthday Honours.
