= Joseph Ekemu =

Uganda lawyer

Justice Minister of the Uganda
- In office 1994–1996
- Preceded by: Abu Mayanja
- Succeeded by: Bart Magunda Katureebe

Personal details
- Born: 5 September 1944 (age 81) Kaberamaido, Uganda

Joseph Kalias Ekemu (September 5, 1944) is a retired Attorney General of Uganda, lawmaker and statesman. He served as Justice Minister of Uganda from 1994 to 1996. Ekemu also represented Kaberamaido District in Parliament and was a committee member of the National Resistance Council (NRC), present-day National Resistance Movement (NRM).

== Jail sentences ==
Ekemu along with David Kamwada, his personal assistant were jailed for two years at the Luzira prison over Shs113 million theft meant for Teso people who had lost their cattle during the insurgency of 1987 to 1990, the money was to compensate the Teso people. Other convictions were on five counts amongst which is the forgery of a Greenland Bank account opening form and the sentence was on money belonging to a foreigner, Suresh Ghelan.

In 2002, he completed the two-year jail sentence. He was the first high-ranking Uganda government official to be convicted over fraud.

In 2018, he pleaded with the then Speaker Rt.Hon Rebecca Alitwala Kadaga for financial assistance saying it would be fair if former legislators were supported. He added former legislators should also be included if it comes to political activities. This was after about 1000 former legislators from the first Parliament in 1962 to the 6th Parliament were elderly and did not have clear sources of income despite them having served the country as members of Parliament.

== Legal practice resumption ==
Ekemu had five months left in Law Council Disciplinary Committee (LCDC) before being jailed, he made an application to continue practicing law which was later rejected by the board and the head of the LCDC. Elijah Wante who had known Ekamu for a long time advised him to file a fresh application for reinstatement. After pleading to the LCDC committee board to allow him to continue practising law saying he had suffered a lot, the board noticed the five months left for him to end two mandatory years and later required him to file a new one after the terms ends.

In September 2004, he was restored as an advocate after serving a four-year ban; the ban was lifted by the committee board of the LCDC after indicating that he was repentant.

== Bibliography ==
- Joseph Ekemu. Encyclopedia, Joseph Ekemu, Unique Identifier: 4779375235. Notes: Occupation: lawyer Education: LLB with honors, Makerere University, 1971. Career: Minister justice and attorney general, Government of Uganda, Kampala, 1994 — Career: Deputy speaker parliament, 1994 Career: Member parliament, 1989–95 Career: Advocate, Ekemu & Co., Kampala, Uganda, 1972–89 Career: Advocate, Elemu & Kabu Co., Kampala, Uganda, 1972–89. Career: Advocate, Kulubya & Co. Advocates, Kampala, Uganda, 1972–89. Career: Advocate, Mboijana & Co. Advcates, Kampala, Uganda, 1972–89, Career: Pupil state attorney, Ministry of Justice, Kampala, Uganda, 1971–72.
