= KSMO (Uganda) =

Ugandan law firm

KSMO Advocates
- Headquarters: Crested Towers, Plot 17 Hannington Road, Kampala, Uganda
- No. of offices: 1
- No. of attorneys: 10
- No. of employees: 20
- Major practice areas: Commercial Law Practice
- Key people: David Kigozi Ssempala (Partner); Richard Mulema Mukasa (Partner); Richard Caesar Obonyo (Partner); Dr. Christopher Mbaziira (Legal Consultant)
- Revenue: Unknown
- Date founded: 2006; 19 years ago
- Founder: David Kigozi Ssempala, Richard Mulema Mukasa & Richard Caesar Obonyo
- Company type: Partnership
- Website: www.ksmo.co.ug

Kigozi Ssempala Mukasa Obonyo, commonly referred to as KSMO Advocates, is a Ugandan law firm headquartered in Kampala, the capital city of Uganda. It is a private legal practice, founded in October 2006. The firm provides corporate and commercial legal services in the country.

== Location ==
The headquarters and offices of KSMO Advocates are located on the 5th Floor of the Short Tower, at Crested Towers, 17 Hannington Road, on Nakasero Hill, in Kampala, Uganda's capital city.

== Overview and history ==
KSMO Advocates was founded by David Kigozi Ssempala, Richard Mulema Mukasa and Richard Caesar Obonyo in October 2006. Two of the firm's founders, David Kigozi Ssempala and Richard Mulema Mukasa, were formerly at Katende Ssempebwa & Company, before they departed to form KSMO. Dr. Cristoper Mbaziira, a Law Professor at Makerere University, serves as legal consultant. The firm has since inception, accepted two more partners; Charlotte Kukundakwe and Kefa Kuteesa Nsubuga. Three other lawyers; Immaculate B. Owomugisha, Simon Peter Waiswa and Daphine Arinda, serve as Associate Attorneys at the firm, as of August 2020. Richard Caesar Obonyo is the Managing Partner of KSMO Advocates.

== Notable cases ==
Below are some of the famous cases handled by the firm:

Uganda Cranes v MTN Uganda

In 2012, KSMO Advocates represented The Uganda Cranes, in a contentious matter in which the players took MTN Uganda to court over breach of contract for their image rights. The players wanted up to 342.3 million shillings (USD 135,000) from the mobile telephone company plus general damages for breach of contract and unfair benefit to MTN Uganda.

KSMO Advocates v MTN Uganda Employees

Also in 2012, KSMO Advocates was behind the massive corruption case in which five MTN Uganda employees were battling accusations of alleged fraud and embezzlement.

Bebe Cool v Bukedde

In 2013, KSMO Advocates came under intense scrutiny in a case in which they wanted Bebe Cool, a top Uganda artiste, to be compensated 800 million shillings (USD 320, 000) over defamation. The defendant in this particular case was Bukedde, a leading local newspaper in Uganda, a member of the Vision Group.

Jacqueline Kemirembe v Makerere University Walter Reed Project

Still in 2013, KSMO Advocates represented Jacqueline Kemirembe, a senior data entry specialist in a case in which she dragged the Makerere University HIV vaccine project – the Makerere University–Walter Reed Project – to court for wrongful dismissal.

== Practice areas ==
KSMO Advocates practices law in the following legal areas among others: (a) Corporate & Commercial Services (b) Banking & Securities (c) Intellectual Property (d) Revenue & Taxation (e) Real Estate (f) Civil & Commercial litigation (g) Legal & Policy consultancy.

== Rankings ==
The 2014 IFLR1000's financial and corporate law rankings for KSMO Advocates indicate that it is a Tier 4 Financial and Corporate Law Firm.

== See also ==
- Law Development Centre
- Uganda Law Society
- List of law firms in Uganda
