= Sebalu & Lule =

Ugandan law firm

S&L Advocates
- Headquarters: SL Chambers, Plot 14, Mackinnon Road, Nakasero, Kampala, Uganda
- No. of offices: 1
- No. of attorneys: 25
- No. of employees: 60
- Major practice areas: Corporate & Commercial Law Practice
- Key people: Barnabas R. Tumusingize (Managing Partner), James Mukasa Sebugenyi (Senior Partner) & Nicholas Ecimu (Partner).
- Revenue: Unknown
- Date founded: 1980 (Kampala)
- Founder: Paulo Sebalu & Godfrey Serunkuma Lule
- Company type: LLP
- Website: S&L Advocates Homepage

S&L Advocates (formerly Sebalu and Lule Advocates) is a Ugandan law firm headquartered in Kampala, the capital city of Uganda. It is a business law firm that was founded in 1980 by Paulo Sebalu and Godfrey Serunkuma Lule. The firm is a member of DLA Piper and the DLA Piper Africa Group. The firm's advocates are members of various professional bodies, including the International Bar Association, the Commonwealth Lawyers Association, the East African Law Society and the Uganda Law Society.

S&L Advocates advises local and multinational organisations across the financial services, energy and infrastructure, insurance, telecommunications, construction, hospitality and leisure, private equity and processing/manufacturing sectors, several of whom are listed on the Uganda Securities Exchange, the JSE Limited and FTSE 100 index. The firm also acts for industry regulators, international financiers, the Government and governmental agencies.

== History ==
S&L Advocates was formed as Sebalu & Lule in 1980 by Paulo Sebalu and Godfrey Serunkuma Lule, both distinguished legal practitioners at the time.

In 2010, S&L joined the DLA Piper Group.

== Work Profile ==
S&L Advocates specialises in the following practice areas: banking and finance, capital markets, corporate and commercial law, commercial dispute resolution, projects and infrastructure, power (energy, oil and gas and mining), mergers and acquisitions, employment and pensions, non-profit organisations, real estate and tax.

Notable transactions include:

- Advised the lenders, including the International Finance Corporation, African Development Bank and Standard Chartered Bank, for the US$900 million project financing of the Bujagali Hydroelectric Power Station on the Victoria Nile, currently Uganda's largest energy and infrastructure project. Although Sebalu & Lule, advising on Uganda law, was a lesser one of the four legal firms involved, the project was "the first greenfield power financing in Uganda and is east Africa's largest private sector investment."
- Advised the Government of Uganda for the concession of assets of Uganda's sole copper mine, Kilembe Mines
- Acted for Rabobank and Rabo Development BV in the acquisition of an equity stake in a listed company in Uganda in what was the first transaction to test the Capital Markets (Mergers and Takeovers) Regulations
- Acted for Standard Chartered Bank, Uganda Telecom and Kakira Sugar Works on the issue of medium-term notes programmes on the Uganda Securities Exchange and for the Nation Media Group for its cross-listing on the Uganda Securities Exchange.
- Acted as Legal Advisor to MTN Uganda during the telecommunications company's listing of 20 percent shareholding in an IPO on the Uganda Securities Exchange during the fourth quarter of calendar year 2021.

Notable cases include:

- Successfully acted for the National Social Security Fund, Uganda statutory provident fund, in its challenge of a US$20 million arbitral award before the Supreme Court of Uganda.
- Successfully acted for Standard Chartered Bank Uganda before the East African Court of Justice in a multi-million dollar dispute founded upon a claim on a guarantee issued by Standard Chartered Bank Uganda.

== Associate firms ==
- DLA Piper
- DLA Piper Africa Group
- Cliffe Dekker Hofmeyr

== Awards & Rankings ==
- The 2014 IFLR1000's financial and corporate law rankings for Sebalu & Lule indicate that it is a Tier 1 financial and corporate law firm. The firm is also ranked as a Tier 1 energy and infrastructure law firm by the same legal directory.
- Sebalu & Lule is ranked as a Band 1 Ugandan law firm in the 2014 edition of Chambers & Partners.
- Barnabas Tumusingize is ranked as a Band 1 general business law expert in the 2014 edition of Chambers & Partners. James Mukasa Sebugenyi and Nicholas Ecimu are ranked as Band 2 and Band 3 general business law experts respectively by the same publication.

== See also ==
- Law Development Centre
- Uganda Law Society
- Godfrey Serunkuma Lule
