= Kateera & Kagumire =

Ugandan law firm

- Headquarters: Crested Towers, Plot 7, Hannington Road, Kampala, Uganda
- No. of offices: 1
- No. of attorneys: 13
- No. of employees: 40
- Major practice areas: General Business Law
- Key people: Yusufu Kagumire (Managing Partner) & John Fisher Kanyemibwa (Senior Partner)
- Revenue: Unknown
- Date founded: 1903 (Kampala)
- Founder: The Britons Hunter and Greig
- Company type: LLP
- Website: kateeraandkagumire.com

Kateera & Kagumire Advocates simply known as Kateera & Kagumire and formerly known as Hunter & Greig is a Ugandan law firm headquartered in Kampala, the capital city of Uganda and with a history dating back to 1903. It is one of the oldest and leading law firms in the country.

The firm's clients include banks and financial institutions, insurance companies, third party administrators, manufacturing and service companies and entrepreneurs. It handles regular work for clients such as Stanbic Bank.

Kateera & Kagumire has practice relationships with a number of accredited International Law firms. Notably, the firm has developed a partnership with, Adams & Adams Attorneys in South Africa, Abelman Frayne & Schwab and Ladas & Parry LLP in the US, Gill Jennings & Every in the U.K and Hamilton Harrison & Mathews in Nairobi, Kenya.

== History ==
Kateera & Kagumire was founded in 1903 as Hunter & Greig by two British citizens, Hunter and Greig who are credited for setting up the first law practice in Uganda.

The firm was later joined by other eminent legal Practitioners of their days like, O.J Keeble, Cohnhan, Gideon Akankwasa, Jonathan Kateera, Christopher Kasibayo and John Sengooba.

In 1984, the firm changed its name to Kateera and Kagumire Advocates. Currently the Firm has Five partners assisted by 8 lawyers. They are assisted by over 20 support staff.

== Membership ==
- Uganda Law Society (ULS)
- East African Law Society (EALS)

== Notable cases ==
Kateera & Kagumire is notable for the following cases:

- In 2003, Kateera & Kagumire represented Uganda Electricity Board in CIVIL SUIT NO. 124 OF 2003 between Mathias Lwanga Kaganda and Uganda Electricity Board.
- In 2006, Kateera & Kagumire represented Uganda Electricity Board in MISCELLANEOUS APPLICATION NO 96 OF 2006 (ARISING FROM CIVIL SUIT NO. 146 OF 2003) between Mildred Kamau and Uganda Electricity Board.
- In 2007, Kateera & Kagumire represented Bank of Baroda (U) Ltd in HCT-00-CC-CS-0921-1997 between Bank of Baroda (U) Ltd and Mpungu & Sons Transporters Ltd.
- In 2012, Kateera & Kagumire represented Uganda Electricity Board in MISCELLANEOUS APPLICATION NO. 262 OF 2012 (Arising from Misc. Application No. 63 of 2007) (Arising out of HCCS No. 1044 of 2001) between Bagamuhanda & 2 Ors and Uganda Electricity Board.

== Practice areas ==
Kateera & Kagumire specialises in the following legal disciplines:

- Banking & Finance
- Commercial Arbitration
- Insurance
- Revenue & Taxation
- Property & Real estate
- Immigration Law
- Intellectual Property
- Labor Employment Law

== Awards & rankings ==
- The 2014 IFLR1000's financial and corporate law rankings for Kateera & Kagumire indicate that it is a Tier 2 financial and corporate law firm.
- The Chambers & Partners law firm rankings for 2014 indicate that Kateera & Kagumire is a Band 3 General Business Law Firm.
- John Fisher Kanyemibwa is lauded for his dual strength in contentious and transactional work and is ranked as a Band 2 transactional lawyer in the 2014 edition of Chambers & Partners.

== See also ==
- Law Development Centre
- Uganda Law Society
