= Legal education in Uganda =

As of June 2020 there are eleven recognized universities in Uganda, that offer education in law. There is, in addition, one specialised school, the Law Development Centre, that teaches aspects of the law that the universities do not teach. The Centre prepares and tests candidates for the Uganda Bar Examination.

== Universities that offer law degrees ==
The following universities are accredited to offer law degrees.

=== Public universities ===
1. Makerere University
2. Gulu University

=== Private universities ===
1. Uganda Christian University
2. Kampala International University
3. Nkumba University
4. Islamic University in Uganda
5. Uganda Pentecostal University
6. Busoga University
7. St. Augustine International University
8. Bishop Stuart University
9. Cavendish University Uganda.
10. Victoria University

== Admission ==
Admission to law school in Uganda requires the candidate to have attained the prerequisite minimum score on the A-level national examinations leading to the award of the Uganda Advanced Certificate of Education or UACE, administered by the Uganda National Examinations Board (UNEB). Each university has its pre-entry requirements. Makerere University, the oldest of all of them, administers a pre-entry examination, with a pass mark of 50 percent.

== Legal education ==
The coursework leading to the award of a Bachelor of Laws degree in Uganda, lasts four years. An internship at the undergraduate level is not compulsory. The coursework is divided into compulsory and non-compulsory courses.

The compulsory courses include the following:

1. Law of Contract
2. Legal Methods
3. Introducing Law
4. Law of Evidence
5. Equity and Trusts
6. Law of Tort
7. Criminal Law
8. Civil Procedure
9. Constitutional Law.

These courses are not compulsory:

1. Administrative Law
2. Conflict of Laws
3. Law of Succession
4. International Law
5. Banking Law
6. Taxation & Revenue Law
7. International Human Rights Law
8. Insurance Law.

== Training for the Bar examination ==
Following the successful completion of the first law degree course, one is admitted to the 9-months course for Postgraduate Diploma in Legal Practice, that allows one to practice as an advocate in the country.

The Law Development Centre (LDC), is the only institution in Uganda, that instructs and examines qualified lawyers for the Bar course. One has to take a pre-entry examination in order to be admitted to the Bar course. An internship lasting 2.5 months is required during the nine-months Bar Course. In order to pass the Bar course, one has to score more than 50 percent in each subject.

== Practicing law ==
Lawyers who have not completed the Bar course may be employed as attorneys or lawyers, at the discretion of the employers. These lawyers cannot appear before a judge in a court of law and cannot represent clients in court.

Foreign-trained lawyers must first take core courses at an accredited Ugandan university, before they can be admitted to the Bar Course. The core courses include (a) Civil Procedure (b) Criminal Procedure and (c) Law of Evidence.

== See also ==
- Judiciary of Uganda
