= KTA Advocates =

Ugandan law firm

- Headquarters: URBRA House, Floor 2, Wing A, Plot 1 Kampala, Uganda
- No. of offices: 1
- No. of attorneys: 9
- No. of employees: 15
- Major practice areas: Intellectual Property; Media & Telecommunications; Broadcasting & IT
- Key people: Justus Karuhanga(Senior Partner) Edgar Tabaro(Business Development Partner), Edwin Tabaro(Managing Partner), Kenneth Muhangi (Partner Technology, Media, Telecommutions & Intellectual Property).
- Date founded: 2009 (Kampala)
- Founder: Justus Karuhanga; Edgar Tabaro; Edwin Tabaro
- Company type: LLP
- Website: www.ktaadvocates.com

KTA Advocates (Formerly Karuhanga, Tabaro & Associates) is a Ugandan law firm headquartered in Kampala, the capital city of Uganda. It is a private legal practice firm founded in 2009.

Justus Karuhanga, the firm's founding senior partner, in particular has a high profile having acted as a legal advisor to the president of Uganda. Edgar Tabaro, the firm's business development partner, is the Justice and Constitutional Affairs minister of Toro Kingdom and also serves as a board member and legal brain for Uganda Communications Authority (UCA). Kenneth Muhangi, the firms Technology & Intellectual Property Partner, lectures cyber law & Intellectual Property, consults for the Ministry of ICT on Innovation & worked on the e-justice project of the Judiciary of Uganda.

The firm as a whole is active in intellectual property, media and telecommunications, broadcasting and IT.

== Membership ==
- Uganda Law Society (ULS)
- East African Law Society (EALS)
- Institute of Corporate Governance of Uganda
- Center for Arbitration and Dispute Resolution

== History ==
KTA Advocates was established as a law firm and duly registered and certified by the Law Council of the Ugandan Ministry of Justice and Constitutional Affairs in 2009 by Justus Karuhanga, Edgar Tabaro and Edwin Tabaro. Since its inception, the Firm has handled a number of noteworthy transactions for multinational corporations, financial institutions, government and non-government organisations, corporations and related agencies, private businesses and individuals in Uganda and globally.

== Notable Cases ==
Airtime dealers v Uganda Telecom

In 2010, KTA represented Ugandan airtime dealers, in a contentious matter in which they took Uganda Telecom to court for breach of distributorship agreements. The dealers then demanded for Shs15 billion ($6 million) for an out of court settlement.

Sylvia Nabiteeko Katende v Bank of Uganda

In 2010, KTA represented Nabiteeko, a senior lecturer at Makerere University, in a case in which she sued Bank of Uganda for using her artistic works on the Shs20,000 note without her consent. This particular suit was valued at Shs1 bn and above.

Elamin v Abu Dhabi Group & Others

In 2012, KTA represented Abdul Rahman Elamin in a case in which the Ugandan businessman sued the Abu Dhabi royal family's business entities over the three per cent shares allotted to him in Warid Telecom. The minority shareholder sued the firm, allegedly over unpaid shares which were then valued at $3.7 million.

== Clients ==
Below are some of the firm's notable clients:

- Salah Khamas Group
- Black Sea Group
- Uganda National Roads Authority (UNRA)
- DTB
- Uganda Communications Commission (UCC)
- Diary Development Authority
- National Information Technology Authority (NITA)
- The King of Toro
- Yoweri Museveni
- DFCU Bank

== Practice areas ==
KTA specializes in the following disciplines:

- Intellectual Property, Trademark, Patents and Product Liability
- Mergers & Acquisitions (M & A)
- Legal Process Outsourcing (LPOS)
- Public-Private Partnerships
- ICT & Telecoms
- Energy & Mining (Extractive Industry, Electricity, Oil & Gas)
- Anti Fraud
- Corporate Finance, Capital Markets & Banking
- Tax Law
- International Humanitarian Law (IHL)
- Alternative Dispute Resolution

== Rankings ==
The 2014 IFLR1000's financial and corporate law firm rankings show that KTA is a financial and corporate law firm in Uganda.

== See also ==
- Law Development Centre
- Uganda Law Society
