= John Wild (cricketer, born 1915) =

English cricketer, colonial administrator, and educator

Personal information
- Full name: John Vernon Wild
- Born: 26 April 1915; Wallasey, Cheshire, England
- Died: 21 July 2012 (aged 97); Burwash, Sussex, England
- Batting: Right-handed
- Bowling: Right-arm slow

Domestic team information
- Years: Team
- 1938: Cambridge University

Career statistics
Competition	First-class
Matches	11
Runs scored	193
Batting average	11.35
100s/50s	–/–
Top score	34
Balls bowled	1,796
Wickets	29
Bowling average	36.10
5 wickets in innings	2
10 wickets in match	–
Best bowling	6/125
Catches/stumpings	5/–
- Source: Cricinfo, 15 January 2022

John Vernon Wild CMG OBE (26 April 1915 — 21 July 2012) was an English first-class cricketer, educator and colonial administrator in the Uganda Protectorate.

== Early life and education ==
Wild was born at Wallasey in April 1915. He was educated at Taunton School, before matriculating to King's College, Cambridge. While studying at Cambridge, he played first-class cricket for Cambridge University Cricket Club in 1938, making eleven appearances. Playing primarily as a spin bowler in the Cambridge side, Wild took 29 wickets in his eleven matches at a bowling average of 36.10; he took two five wicket hauls, with best figures of six for 125. As a batsman, he scored 193 runs at an average of 11.35, with a highest score of 34.

== Career ==
After graduating from Cambridge, Wild joined the Colonial Service in the Protectorate of Uganda in 1938. He was commissioned into the British Army as a second lieutenant in September 1943. He resumed his colonial service following the war, becoming the chairman of the Ugandan Committee on Self-Government in 1959, which came to be known as the Wild Committee. He was made an officer of the Order of the British Empire in the 1955 Birthday Honours in recognition of his services in Uganda, and was later made a companion to the Order of St Michael and St George in the 1960 Birthday Honours. While in Uganda, Wild wrote three books on the country and became fluent in the Acholi dialect. He left the Colonial Service in 1960 and returned to England, where he took up a post teaching maths at Hele's School, Exeter. He left there in 1971 to become a maths lecturer at Exeter College, where he remained until 1976.

== Personal life ==
Wild died at the nursing home in which was resident in at Burwash in Sussex in July 2012.
