= St. Leo's College, Kyegobe =

St. Leo's College Kyegobe

Location
- Fort Portal, Kabarole District, Western Region; Uganda
- 0.628622°N 30.286115°E

Information
- Type: Public boarding middle school and high school
- Motto: "We Strive for Excellence"
- Religious affiliation: Roman Catholic Church
- Established: 21 September 1921 (104 years ago)
- Headteacher: Ivan Otigo
- Gender: Boys
- Athletics: Basketball, hockey, rugby, soccer, tennis, track, volleyball
- Nickname: "SLECK"

St. Leo's College, Kyegobe is a Catholic-based, government-aided residential boys' secondary school, located in Fort Portal, Kabarole District, in the Western Region of Uganda. The school offers both "O" and "A" level education.

== Location ==
The college is in the town of Fort Portal, approximately 5 kilometres (3 miles), south of the post office along the Nyakahita–Kazo–Kamwenge–Fort Portal Road. This location is about 300 kilometres (186 miles), by road, west of Kampala, Uganda's capital and largest city. The coordinates of the school are 0°37'43.0"N, 30°17'10.0"E (Latitude:0.628622; Longitude:30.286115).

== Overview ==
It was founded in 1921 by the Catholic White Fathers. The college was first established at what presently stands as St. Mary's Seminary in Virika, Fort Portal. By then, it was attracting pupils from St. Peter's Primary School and other Catholic primary schools. In the early 1930s, the White Fathers invited the Brothers of Christian Instruction to take over from them. In the early 1960s, the school was shifted to its current location, on a hill overlooking the plains of the Rwenzori Mountains and some parts of Fort Portal town.

== Reputation ==
St. Leo's College was, at one time, among the most prestigious schools in Uganda because of its history, influence, excellent academic performance, and dominance in sports. More recently, it has fallen on hard times, with declining student grades, increased student hooliganism, recurrent student strikes, and financial shortfalls.

== Academics ==
Subjects offered at "O" Level include biology, chemistry, Christian religious education, commerce, computer studies, English language and literature, fine art, French, geography, history, mathematics, and physics.

At "A" Level, the subjects offered are categorised into arts and sciences. The arts subjects offered are history, economics, divinity, French, literature in English, geography, computer studies, and fine art.

The science subjects offered are physics, chemistry, mathematics, biology, subsidiary mathematics, and general paper, which is compulsory.

== Notable alumni ==
The following notable people are alumni of St. Leo's Kyegobe: (1) Crescent Baguma, (2) Venansius Baryamureeba, (3) Tress Bucyanayandi, (4) Tom Butime (5) John Byabagambi (6) Joseph Mulenga (8) Charles Onyango-Obbo and (9) Shaban Bantariza (10) Dr. Paul Kawanga Ssemogerere (11) Selestino Babungi (12) Herbert Kiiza (13) Abaine Jonathan Bulegyeya (14) Dr. Silver Mugisha.

== See also ==
- Education in Uganda
- List of boarding schools
- List of schools in Uganda
- Roman Catholicism in Uganda
