= Janat Mukwaya =

Ugandan politician (born 1951)

- Born: 12 December 1951 (age 74); Uganda
- Citizenship: Uganda
- Education: Makerere University (Bachelor of Arts); University of London (Master of Science)
- Occupations: Politician & Military officer
- Years active: 1980 — present
- Known for: Politics

Janat Balunzi Mukwaya (born 12 December 1951) is a politician and former Major in the military of Uganda. Currently she is a Senior Presidential Advisor. Before that, she previously served as the Minister for General Duties in the Office of the Prime Minister from 16 February 2009 until 27 May 2011. the Minister of Gender, Labour and Social Affairs from 6 June 2016 until December 2019. Minister of Trade and Industry from June 2006 until February 2009. In May 2011, she temporarily retired from politics and was replaced in the cabinet by Kiddu Makubuya. She also served as the elected member of Parliament for Mukono South Constituency in Mukono District, from 2006 until her retirement in 2011.

== Early life and education ==
Mukwaya was born on 12 December 1951 in Mukono District. She studied political science and social administration at Makerere University between 1971 and 1975, graduating with a Bachelor of Arts degree with honors. Between 1975 and 1981, she worked as an administrative judge (magistrate) grade II in rural court. In 1981, she joined the National Resistance Army (NRA) as a combatant. She rose to the rank of captain in the NRA. She also holds a Master of Arts degree in public policy and management from the University of London.

== Political career ==
After the NRA captured power in 1986, Mukwaya was appointed director of women's affairs in the Ministry of Gender, Labor and Social Affairs, where she served until 1990. In 1994, she was appointed principal private secretary to the Vice President of Uganda, serving in that capacity until 1995. Between 1995 and 1996, Mukwaya served as Minister of State for Luwero Triangle in the Office of the President. Between 1996 and 2001, she served as Minister of Gender, Labor and Social Development.

She became Uganda's Attorney general and Minister of Justice & Constitutional Affairs in 2004 and served in that position until 2005. In 2005, she was transferred to the Agriculture Ministry where she served as Minister of Agriculture, Animal Industry & Fisheries until 2006.

In 2006, she was elected to Parliament on the National Resistance Movement ticket to represent Mukono South Constituency. In the same year, she was appointed Minister of Tourism, Trade and Industry, a position she held until she was appointed to the prime minister's office as Cabinet Minister for General Duties. According to the website of the Ugandan Parliament, Mukwaya is enrolled in a master's degree program via long-distance learning, leading to a Master of Science degree in public policy and management at the University of London. In January 2010, the Ugandan press reported that she would not contest her parliamentary seat in the 2011 national elections.

== Out of retirement ==
In June 2016, Mukwaya was brought out of retirement, when she was named Cabinet Minister of Gender, Labour and Social Affairs. One of the first tasks as cabinet minister of labour for the second time, was to negotiate a labour agreement with the Kingdom of Jordan, whereby Ugandan migrants can seek employment in the kingdom.
