= Benedicto Kiwanuka =

Ugandan Prime Minister (1922–1972)

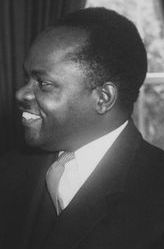

1st Prime Minister of Uganda
- In office 1 March 1962 – 30 April 1962
- Preceded by: Position Established
- Succeeded by: Milton Obote

Personal details
- Born: 8 May 1922 Kisabwa, Bukomansimbi District, Uganda Protectorate
- Died: 22 September 1972 (aged 50) Makindye Military Prison, Kampala, Uganda
- Cause of death: Assassination
- Party: Democratic Party
- Education: University College London
- Religion: Catholicism

Benedicto Kagimu Mugumba Kiwanuka (8 May 1922 – 22 September 1972) was a Ugandan politician and statesman who served as the first prime minister of Uganda. He was the leader of the Democratic Party and one of the political figures in Uganda that led the country in the transition between colonial British rule and independence. He was assassinated in 1972 by Idi Amin's regime.

He also served as the first Ugandan (and first black) Chief Justice of Uganda.

== Biography ==
A member of the Baganda ethnic group, Benedicto Kagimu Mugumba Kiwanuka was born in Kisabwa to Kaketo-Namugera (father) and was a member of the Roman Catholic Church.

Following a law course in Lesotho in 1950–52, he travelled to London to study for the Bar at University College in London. He was called to the Bar by Gray's Inn in February 1956.

As a result of the September 1961 Uganda Constitutional Conference held in London, Uganda achieved internal self-government on 1 March 1962. Kiwanuka became Uganda's first Chief Minister in the new National Assembly.

New elections, however, were held in April 1962, with Kiwanuka's party losing to the alliance of Milton Obote's Uganda People's Congress and the Buganda traditionalist party, Kabaka Yekka. In addition, Kiwanuka's Catholicism made him unpopular with his fellow Baganda, a mainly Protestant people. Uganda achieved independence on 9 October 1962, with Obote as the first prime minister of a fully independent Uganda.

Kiwanuka was imprisoned in 1969 by Obote's government, but was one of 55 political detainees released by Idi Amin immediately after the coup that brought Amin to power. Amin appointed him as chief justice of Uganda on 27 June 1971.

Kiwanuka soon came into confrontation with Amin's disregard for the rule of law. In the immediate aftermath of Obote's 1972 invasion of Uganda, Kiwanuka was arrested at gunpoint by Amin's men as he presided over a session of the High Court. As well as countermanding from the bench some of Amin's more draconian orders, Kiwanuka had also secretly agreed to support Obote's return to power, with the proviso that Kiwanuka would be involved in constitutional reform.

== Death ==
Kiwanuka was killed on 22 September at Makindye Military Prison. Western accounts described a prolonged execution which, according to eyewitnesses, involved Kiwanuka's ears, nose, lips, and arms being severed, a disembowelling, and castration before he was finally immolated. Other sources claimed that, rather than being tortured, Kiwanuka was personally shot by Amin. Kiwanuka's death was not acknowledged as an execution, with Amin instead publicly blaming it on Obote's supporters and even launching a police investigation. Kiwanuka's killing was the first of a series directed against leading figures in the Baganda and Ankole tribes, aimed at curbing their power.

== Legacy ==
Kiwanuka's grandson, Mathias Kiwanuka, played defensive end for Boston College's American football team and was the New York Giants' first round pick in the 2006 NFL draft, eventually winning two championships with the team.

In 2018, a monument was dedicated to him at the request of Ugandan president Yoweri Museveni.
