= Kiddu Makubuya =

Ugandan lawyer, politician and academic (1949–2024)

- Born: 30 July 1949; Protectorate of Uganda
- Died: 19 August 2024 (aged 75); Uganda
- Citizenship: Uganda
- Education: Makerere University; Bachelor of Laws; Law Development Centre Kampala; Diploma in Legal Practice; Yale University; Master of Laws; Doctor of Juridical Science
- Occupations: Lawyer, politician
- Years active: 1996–2024
- Known for: Politics Law

Kiddu Makubuya (30 July 1949 – 19 August 2024) was a Ugandan lawyer, politician, and academic. He served as minister for general duties in the office of the prime minister. He was appointed to that position on 27 May 2011, replacing Janat Mukwaya who retired from elective politics. Before that, from 2005 until 2011, he served as Uganda's Attorney general. He resigned from cabinet on 16 February 2012 amid allegations of misappropriation of government funds. He was also member of parliament, representing Katikamu County South, Luweero District.

== Early life and education ==
Makubuya was born on 30 July 1949. He held a First Class Honors Bachelor of Laws degree from Makerere University, which he obtained in 1974. He also held a Master of Laws degree and a Doctor of Juridical Science, both from Yale Law School and obtained in 1976 and 1979 respectively. On returning to Uganda, he joined the Law Development Center where he completed his Diploma in Legal Practice between 1981 and 1982. He enrolled as an advocate of the Uganda High Court in 1985.

== Career outside politics ==
Makubuya worked as a special assistant at the faculty of law, Makerere University, in 1974 and 1975. In 1979, he was promoted to lecturer at the same university, a position he held until 1982 when he became a senior lecturer. In 1984, he was promoted to associate professor. He was also a partner in Kasolo & Khiddu Advocates, a private law firm.

Makubuya was a member of the Uganda Constitutional Commission, which was instrumental in drafting the 1995 Constitution of Uganda. He was a member of the Commission of Inquiry into Violations of Human Rights. Between 1984 and 1987, he was the editor in chief of the Uganda Law Society Review. Makubuya was the head of the Department of Law and Jurisprudence at the faculty of law, Makerere University, until 1995, when he was appointed director of the Uganda Human Rights and Peace Center.

== Political career ==
Makubuya joined politics in 1988. In 1996 he was elected Member of Parliament for "Katikamu South Constituency" in Luweero District. He was later appointed State Minister for Luweero Triangle in the Office of the President. In 1998 his office as Minister of State in charge of Luweero Triangle was transferred to the Office of the Prime Minister. In the same year, he was appointed State Minister for Foreign Affairs (International Cooperation), a portfolio he held until 5 April 1999, when he was appointed Minister of Education and Sports. He has served as Uganda's Justice Minister and Attorney General, from 14 January 2005 until 27 May 2011, when he assumed the position of Minister for General Duties in the Office of the Prime Minister. He resigned from the cabinet on 16 February 2012.

== Other roles ==
Besides his professional experience, Makubuya served in a number of administrative capacities. Between 1981 and 1982, he was an ex-officio member of the Uganda Law Council and the Management Committee of the Law Development Centre. He was a member of various committees at Makerere University, including the Senate. The former minister’s areas of interest in research included jurisprudence, family law, international law, law and development, human rights of women, land law and land planning, development finance, refugee law, constitutional law, law and population, and gender and law.

== Death ==
Makubuya died in Uganda on 19 August 2024, at the age of 75.

== See also ==
- Politics of Uganda
