= Makindye Prison =

Prison in Uganda

Makindye Prison is a Uganda government state-run prison which became notorious for extrajudicial killings and execution of government opponents during the time of Ugandan dictator, Idi Amin.

Makindye Prison started and was built as a conventional civilian prison. It was turned into a military prison in 1971 when dictator Idi Amin came to power. Amin's authorities then started detaining opponents of the government there.

John Kakonge, Uganda's former Minister of Agriculture under Milton Obote, was taken to Makindye Prison where his skull was crushed by a hammer allegedly by other prisoners. According to one version, prisoners were told that by hitting him, they would be saving themselves a similar fate. In turn, each prisoner was given a hammer to do as the previous one had done believing the same. A second report stated that prisoners were placed in a line and bludgeoned the person in front while waiting for a blow from behind.

- Bob Astles was imprisoned for seventeen weeks in the prison during 1972, transferred to Luzira Maximum Security Prison and released in 1985.
- Basil Kiiza Bataringaya was imprisoned here before his execution in 1972.
- Benedicto Kiwanuka was a Ugandan lawyer who was mutilated, castrated and finally immolated in the prison in September 1972.

The prison is still located in Makindye, one of the suburbs of Kampala city in Uganda.
