= Grace Ibingira =

Ugandan lawyer and politician

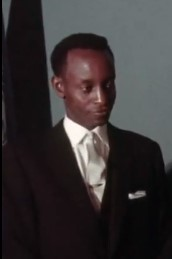
- Grace Ibingira at the United Nations Headquarters, October 1962

Minister of Information of Uganda
- In office 7 June 1979 – 19 June 1979

Personal details
- Born: Grace Stuart Katebariirwe Ibingira; May 23, 1932 Ibanda County, Ankore District, Uganda Protectorate
- Died: December 1995
- Party: Uganda People's Congress

Grace Stuart Katebariirwe Ibingira (23 May 1932 – December 1995) was a Ugandan lawyer and politician.

== Early life ==
Grace Ibingira was born on 23 May 1932 in Ibanda County, Ankore District, Uganda Protectorate. His father, Alfred Katebarirwe, was a Gombolola chief. From 1942 until 1950 he attended Mbarara High School. The following year he enrolled in King's College Budo. He graduated in 1953 with a grade one Cambridge School Certificate. Subsequently, taking up the study of law, he graduated in 1958 magna cum laude from the University College Wales, Aberystwyth. Ibingira finished his studies in 1959 with a year of postgraduate work at the University of London. He was then called to the bar by Middle Temple, being listed as a barrister of the Supreme Court of England. That same year he went to Kampala to serve as an advocate for the Uganda High Court.

== Political career ==
=== Entry into politics ===
In 1960, Ibingira cofounded the Uganda People's Congress (UPC) political party with Milton Obote and Abu Mayanja. Obote became the leader of the party while Ibingira became its legal adviser. His political support derived from four areas: the UPC political machine based in Ankore, southern municipal and district politicians who felt threatened by Obote's populist appeal, conservative intellectuals who found Obote's image drab and unimpressive, and Edward Mutesa, the Kabaka (king) of Buganda.

=== Ugandan independence ===
Ibingira played an important role in determining the look of the Flag of Uganda (pictured).

Ibingira was elected to the Uganda Legislative Council in 1960 by the Ankore Eishengyero (district council). The Democratic Party (DP) won a majority in Uganda's first free national elections in 1961, and formed a government. The UPC members and traditionalist Baganda disliked the Catholic orientation of the DP, but were diametrically opposed to each other's ideals. Despite this, Ibingira was given the responsibility of making contact with the Baganda to establish an alliance. The UPC chose him for the role because he was personally acquainted with Mutesa. After several rounds of negotiation, the UPC and Baganda leaders held a conference whereupon an agreement was reached. Soon afterwards the Baganda created the Kabaka Yekka (KY), a traditionalist party that entered into an alliance with the UPC. Following the UPC's victory in the April 1962 general elections, Obote was tasked with forming a government. He chose Ibingira to serve as Minister of Justice. Ibingira also played an influential role in determining the look of the Flag of Uganda, chairing a committee charged with drafting a design and suggesting that the standard be modeled off of the West German Flag. Uganda became independent on 9 October 1962.

=== Rivalry with Obote ===
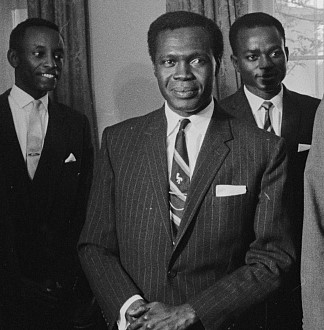
From left to right: Ibingira, Milton Obote, and John Kakonge in 1962

Ibingira felt that Obote was not educated enough to serve as Prime Minister of Uganda and believed that he had been given the position solely because of his anti-colonial rhetoric. In 1964 Ibingira initiated a struggle to gain control of the UPC with the ultimate goal of deposing Obote from the party presidency. At a party conference in April he challenged John Kakonge for the secretariat-general of the UPC. He convinced Obote that Kakonge posed a threat to his leadership of the UPC. With Obote's support, Ibingira ousted Kakonge by two votes. He used his new position to purge the party of a number of leftists and endorsed the abolition of the UPC Youth League.

Meanwhile, Mutesa increasingly feared that the UPC would deny his kingdom its traditional autonomy. He concluded that in order to retain power he would have to garner influence in national politics. Mutesa proceeded to instruct Baganda MPs to join the UPC with the goal of bolstering Ibingira's position and unseating Obote, thus allowing for a reorientation of the UPC-KY alliance that would be more favorable to Buganda. As his working relationship with Mutesa improved, Ibingira amassed a coalition of non-Baganda southerners, dubbed the "Bantu Group". In December 1964 he, under the cover of checking on his ranch in Ankore, traveled to the United States to raise funds to support anti-socialist causes. Upon his return, he successfully used the money to expand his following. The following year Ibingira played a key role in passing an amendment to the Police Ordinance through Parliament that allowed the police to disperse any public meeting or assembly. By then it was apparent that the UPC had divided into an Ibingira-led wing and an Obote-led wing. When Ibingira attempted to convene a UPC conference in his capacity as party secretary general, the police—acting under the authority of the new statute—shut it down.

In early 1966 a banker leaked the financial records of Idi Amin, a soldier in the Ugandan army who had close ties with Prime Minister Obote. The documents implicated Amin in illicit gold trafficking along the Democratic Republic of the Congo border. A motion tabled in Parliament charged Amin with corruption and accused Obote of being complicit in his actions. The UPC resolved to reject it. However, on 4 February, while Obote was away from Kampala, the capital, Ibingira convinced the cabinet to recognise the complaint. When Obote returned eleven days later, he was unable to dissuade his ministers from proceeding with an investigation. The cabinet attempted to convene on 22 February to appoint a commission of inquiry into the matter, but Obote had the police interrupt the meeting and place Ibingira and four other ministers under arrest. They were transferred to Karamoja as per a colonial law that allowed for the detention and removal of "undesirable" persons. Ibingira and the ministers petitioned the courts for a writ of habeas corpus. A Uganda High Court judge found the detention legal and denied the petition, but the East African Court of Appeal ruled that the relevant law violated a Ugandan citizen's constitutional right to freedom of movement and ordered a writ of habeas corpus to be granted. Ibingira and his colleagues were immediately rearrested outside the court in Baganda under the colonial Emergency Regulations and the government passed the Deportation Act to cover its actions. Ibingira and the other ministers filed a new suit, but in a hearing the court affirmed the legality of the new law.

=== Post-Obote career ===
On 25 January 1971 Amin launched a military coup, ousting Obote and seizing power. He released Ibingira along with 54 other political prisoners three days later and appointed him Uganda's Ambassador and Permanent Representative to the United Nations. Ibingira later went into exile. When a Tanzanian invasion threatened the Ugandan regime, he promoted Yusuf Lule as a potential successor to Amin. Ibingira attended the Moshi Conference in March 1979 where Ugandan exiles elected Lule to succeed Amin once he was deposed. Lule appointed Ibingira Minister of Information on 7 June 1979. His addition to the cabinet particularly upset the National Consultative Committee. On 19 June Lule removed Ibingira from his cabinet and made him Ambassador to the UN.

In 1980 Ibingira published a book, entitled, African Upheavals since Independence. He died in December 1995.
