= Uganda Legislative Council =

Governmental body in Uganda

Type
- Type: Unicameral

History
- Established: 1920
- Disbanded: 1962
- Succeeded by: Parliament of Uganda
- Seats: Varied over time

Meeting place
- Kampala

The Uganda Legislative Council (LEGCO) was the predecessor of the Parliament of Uganda, prior to Uganda's independence from the United Kingdom. LEGCO was small to start with and all its members were Europeans. Its legislative powers were limited, since all important decisions came from the British Government in Whitehall.

== First LEGCO meeting – 23 March 1921 ==
Uganda's Legislative Council (LEGCO) was created by the Colonial Office in 1920 by the Uganda Order 1920 (SR&O 1920/884), an Order-in-Council. The LEGCO had its first meeting on Wednesday, 23 March 1921. Its composition then was small and all its members were Europeans. It was made up of the colonial Governor as President, and four officials namely: the Chief Secretary, the Attorney General, the Treasurer, and the Principal Medical Officer, plus two nominated non-officials who were: H. H. Hunter (a lawyer from Kampala), H. E. Lewis (a manager of the East Africa Company, which was the successor to the Imperial British East Africa Company). The intention had been to have three non-official members made up of one representative of the planters and ginners, one representative from the business community and one Indian. The Indians wanted a representation in the LEGCO equal to the Europeans. This was refused on the grounds, according to the colonial government at the time, that representation in the LEGCO was not based on any community group.

In 1921, the number of Asians in Uganda was 5,000. The Europeans numbered 1,000. There was, therefore, a vacant Asian position. This was filled on a temporary basis by Major A. L. Ranton, who was not a resident in Uganda, but had estates in Mityana, approximately 48 miles west of Kampala.

The unofficial membership of the LEGCO consisted of only Europeans between 1921 and 1926. The four official members at this time were all Europeans. The first Indian member of the LEGCO was nominated in 1926 and the second member was appointed in 1933. They were appointed in their personal capacity. Thus the early years of the LEGCO were dominated by a European membership, later a few Indians were added. In 1946 the number of European and Asian members was increased to three each.

There were some concerns about the powers of the LEGCO from Buganda. On Monday 21 March 1921, Ssekabaka Daudi Chwa (King of Buganda) and Sir Apollo Kaggwa wrote a letter to the colonial governor questioning the Legislative Council's powers to make laws in Buganda. The letter referred to article 5 of the Uganda Agreement 1900 which in effect meant Buganda had complete self-governance in terms of local administration and so any laws made by the colonial governor applied to Buganda only if they did not conflict with the terms of the 1900 agreement.

The British Government, having declared Buganda a British protectorate on Monday 18 June 1894, following a mission to Uganda by Sir Gerald Portal as a newly appointed British Special Commissioner in 1892, expanded the protectorate. Other parts of what is now Uganda were added to the British protectorate two years later in 1896; these were: Bunyoro, Toro, Ankole and Busoga. Other parts of Uganda were added by treaties. The establishment of a legislative council in Uganda took a long time. After the declaration of a British protectorate, it took 27 years before a legislative council was set up in Uganda. It took even longer to admit African members to the LEGCO.

The first African members of the LEGCO were admitted in 1945; some 25 years after the LEGCO was set up. The three African representatives who joined the LEGCO were sworn in on Tuesday 4 December 1945; they were: Michael Ernest Kawalya Kaggwa (Katikiro, i.e. Prime Minister of Buganda), Petero Nyangabyaki (Katikiro of Bunyoro), and Yekonia Zirabamuzaale (Secretary General of Busoga). In the mid 1950s, the number of seats for Africans were substantially increased, so that by 1954 fifty percent of the membership was African.

== Direct elections of African representatives held in October 1958 ==
In January 1958, a Speaker to preside over the Legislative Council was appointed by the colonial Governor. Later on in October that year (1958), the first direct elections of African representative members were held. They were held in only 10 constituencies. These elections were supervised by Mr C.P.S. Allen. The actual figures on the final register were 626,046 and those who actually cast votes were 534,326. The elections were flawed – not everyone participated.

The composition of the LEGCO in 1958 was as follows:

1. The Speaker,
2. The government side was made up of (a) all members of the Executive Council, three civil servants who were there to support the ex-officio members (i.e. the Administrative Secretary, the Solicitor General, and the Secretary to the Treasury, (b) three Parliamentary Secretaries (all Africans) to the Ministries of Local Government, Education and Labour, and Commerce and Industry, (c) The government backbench which was composed of 15 nominated members made up of 10 Africans, 3 Europeans and 2 Asians. The government backbench was made up of people of experience who could freely speak and vote as they wished in the LEGCO, except on motions regarded by the government as motions of confidence.
3. The representative side was composed of 12 African elected members representing various parts of Uganda, except in the case of Ankole where the district council effectively became an electoral college. Bugisu District Council refused to participate in the elections, hence one African member was nominated rather than being elected. Although there was a provision for five elected members from Buganda, elections did not take place in Buganda. The Buganda Government and the Lukiiko had advised people in Buganda not to register for elections. There was no representative from Karamoja. There were six nominated Europeans and six nominated Asians.

Thus, the government side had 32 members while the representative side had 30 members which included the five vacancies for Buganda. The government effectively had a majority of seven (32 minus 25). The LEGCO also had at the time five nominated women members.

== Committee on self-government set up under John Vernon Wild ==
On Wednesday 4 February 1959, a Constitutional Committee on self-government for Uganda was set up by the British colonial Governor Sir Frederick Crawford KCMG OBE. The committee was chaired by John Vernon Wild OBE and has since been known as the Wild Committee. The committee was composed of 11 Africans, three Europeans (inclusive of the chairman) and two Asians. The members of the Constitutional Committee were:

J. V. Wild (chairman), A. A. Baerlein, T. B. Bazarrabusa, K. Ingram, H. K. Jaffer, C. B. Katiti, Erisa Kironde, B. K. Kirya, G. B. K. Magezi, B. J. Mukasa, W. W. K. Nadiope, A. M. Obote, Cuthbert Joseph Obwangor, G. Oda, C. K. Patel.

The secretary of the Constitutional Committee was Frank K. Kalimuzo.

The strict terms of reference for the committee were "to consider and to recommend to the Governor the form of direct elections on a common roll for representative members of the Legislative Council to be introduced in 1961, the number of representative seats to be filled under the above system, their allocation among the different areas of the Protectorate and the method of ensuring that there will be adequate representation on the Legislative Council for non-Africans."

The report of the committee was sent to the Governor on Saturday 5 December 1959. The committee also promised a supplementary report recommending constituency boundaries once the population figures by counties and sub-counties were available. The recommendation of the Wild Committee was that: direct elections should be held in all parts of Uganda, and no option should be offered to hold indirect elections. Another key recommendation was that all members of the LEGCO should be elected on a common role. Prior to this happening the colonial Governor used to nominate members.

== The LEGCO powers were limited ==
Although the LEGCO operated as a parliament of some sort, important matters to do with Uganda remained in the hands of the British government in London. For example, when he appointed the constitutional committee, the colonial Governor made it clear that "the size and composition of LEGCO and also possible size of the Government....are matters on which a very special responsibility lies directly with Her Majesty's Government and cannot be settled here in Uganda."

The LEGCO was the first national legislature in Uganda. By all accounts although it was supposed to be a parliament of some kind, the character of the LEGCO meant that it had no real powers of government since such powers were effectively in the hands of Her Majesty's Government in the UK. In effect the LEGCO was a special club with no real importance for a very long time.

The powers of the LEGCO were very limited indeed, for example

(i) the British Government had the power to disallow any ordinances passed by the LEGCO;
(ii) No ordinances passed by the LEGCO could conflict with the 1900 Buganda Agreement,
(iii) All ordinances passed by the LEGCO required the assent of the British colonial Governor in Uganda;
(iv) The LEGCO did not have any power to rule on constitutional matters, defence policy and foreign affairs; these were all matters reserved for the British Government.

== Leading up to Uganda's Independence ==
The process of registering voters started in 1960 when Uganda had constituencies demarcated for the first time. Only 3% of eligible voters in Buganda participated in the process; the Lukiiko had warned all Baganda not to take part in the registration process.

On Wednesday 1 March 1961, the first direct elections to the LEGCO were held in Uganda under the procedures recommended by the Wild committee. Two major constitutional conferences were held in London, in October 1961 and June 1962. Following elections on Wednesday 25 April 1962, Uganda gained independence from Britain on Tuesday 9 October 1962. The Legislative Council was replaced by the National Assembly, i.e. the Parliament of Uganda. The First Session of the First Parliament of Uganda was held on Wednesday 10 October 1962.
