= George Kanyeihamba =

Ugandan politician and author (1939–2025)

Justice George Wilson Kanyeihamba

Justice of the Supreme Court of Uganda
- In office 1997 – November 2009
- President: Yoweri Museveni

Personal details
- Born: August 11, 1939 Kinaba, Kinkizi District, Kigezi Region, Uganda
- Died: July 14, 2025 (aged 85) Uganda
- Spouse: Susan Kanyeihamba (née Randall)
- Children: 3 (plus one adopted daughter)
- Education: Portsmouth University (LLB); University of Warwick (PhD, LLD h.c.)
- Occupation: Judge, politician, author, academic
- Known for: Chair, Legal Committee of the Constituent Assembly (1995 Constitution); Dissent in 2006 presidential election petition
- Cabinet: Government of Uganda

George Wilson Kanyeihamba (11 August 1939 – 14 July 2025) was a Ugandan author, politician, and judge who was a cabinet minister and member of parliament. He was also a chair of the Legal Committee of the Constituent Assembly that made the 1995 Constitution. He was appointed a member of the Supreme Court of Uganda in 1997 and retired in November 2009. He had earlier served as minister of commerce, minister of justice, and attorney-general, all in President Yoweri Museveni's administration. He held a Ph.D. in law from the University of Warwick. In 2008, Warwick awarded him an honorary LLD.

Kanyeihamba was one of the three supreme court justices who ruled that the re-election of President Museveni in 2006 was fraudulent enough to be nullified. Thereafter he lost his post as judge of the African Court on Human and Peoples' Rights and commentators believe that his stand in that election petition cost him his job.

He was critical of the Government of Uganda when armed men invaded the premises of the High Court of Uganda to rearrest treason suspects that had been released on bail by the court. The Constitutional Court has since ruled that the invasion of the court premises was unconstitutional.

== Background ==
George Wilson Kanyeihamba was born on 11 August 1939. in Kinaba in the Kinkizi District of the Kigezi Region. He was the last born and eleventh child of Zakaliya Bafwokworora and Kyenda Malyamu Kyakundwa. He attended Hamurwa Church School, Nyaruhanga Anglican Church Primary School, Nyakatare Church School, Kigezi High School, Busoga College Mwiri, and Norwich City College. He graduated with a Bachelor of Laws from Portsmouth University In the 1970's, he was awarded the degree of Doctor of Laws from the University of Warwick in the United Kingdom. Kanyeihamba died on 14 July 2025.

== Career ==
Kanyeihamba was also the chancellor of both the Kampala International University and Kabale University. Additionally, he held the following positions:

- Member of the Foundation for Human Rights Initiative
- Chairman of The Committee on Judges' Terms And Conditions Of Service
- Legal Adviser to the President of Uganda on Human Rights and International Affairs
- Chairman of the board of trustees of the Kabale University Chairman, Legal and Drafting Committee of the Constituent Assembly
- Chair of the International Commission of Jurists Advisory Panel of Eminent Commonwealth Judicial Experts

== Teaching and authorship ==
On completion of his undergraduate and professional courses, Kanyeihamba was appointed Lecturer at Portsmouth College, now the University of Portsmouth. Later on, he was appointed State Attorney with special responsibilities for teaching law to professional classes and for the London External Degree undergraduates at the Nsamizi Law School in Entebbe which later became the Law Development Centre.

Kanyeihamba worked as a lecturer in law at Lanchester Polytechnic, now Coventry University, and at the University of Wales in Cardiff.

He authored and co-authored several journal articles and books;

=== Articles ===
- Legalism and Politics in East Africa: The Dilemma of the Court of Appeal for East Africa published in January 1973 in Transition No. 43, pp. 43–54.
- Urban planning law in East Africa With special reference to Uganda published in January 1973 in Progress and Planning volume 2 pages 1–83.
- Law in urban planning and development in East Africa published in January 1974. Thesis (Ph.D.)--University of Warwick.
- Urban planning law in East Africa published in December 1974 in Progress in Planning volume 2 pages 1–83.
- Book reviews and notes published by The law Teacher in January 1977 volume 11 issue 1.
- Improving the Standards of Human Rights and Refugee Protection in Africa was published in May 1987 in Refuge: Canada's Journal on Refugees volume 6 number 4.
- The impact of received law on planning and development in Anglophonic Africa published in June 1980 in International Journal of Urban and Regional Research volume 4 number 2 pages 239 - 266.

=== Books ===
- Constitutional Law and Government in Uganda: The Theory and Practice of Constitutionalism in Uganda Including the Government and Local Administrations, the Citizen and the State, Administrative Law, the East African Community, and the Commonwealth published by East African Literature Bureau in 1975.
- Reflections on the Muslim Leadership Question in Uganda. Published by Fountain Publishers in 1998.
- Kanyeihamba's Commentaries on Law, Politics and Governance. Published by Law Africa in 2006.
- Constitutional and Political History of Uganda: From 1894 to Present. Published in 2010 by Law Africa.
- The Blessings And Joy Of Being Who You Are. Published in 2012 by Marianum Press Ltd.

== Personal life and death ==
Kanyeihamba was married to Susan Kanyeihamba (née Randall). Together, they had three children. Kanyeihamba also had an adopted daughter.

Kanyeihamba died on 14 July 2025, at the age of 85.
