= List of heads of state of Uganda =

This is a list of the heads of state of Uganda, from the independence of Uganda in 1962 to the present day.

From 1962 to 1963, the head of state under the Constitution of 1962 was the queen of Uganda, Elizabeth II, who was also the monarch of other Commonwealth realms. The queen was represented in Uganda by a governor-general. Uganda removed Elizabeth II as head of state under a 1963 constitutional amendment and the monarch and governor-general were replaced by a ceremonial president. The president under the 1963 constitution was an elective monarch, chosen by the parliament from among Uganda's five traditional kings. Uganda became a republic within the Commonwealth when this system was replaced by an executive presidency in 1966.

== Commonwealth realm (1962–1963) ==
The succession to the throne was the same as the succession to the British throne.

No.	Portrait	Name (Birth–Death)	Reign			Royal house	Prime minister(s)
No.	Portrait	Name (Birth–Death)	Reign start	Reign end	Duration	Royal house	Prime minister(s)
1		Queen Elizabeth II (1926–2022)	9 October 1962	9 October 1963	1 year	Windsor	Obote

=== Governor-general ===
The governor-general was the representative of the monarch in Uganda and exercised most of the powers of the monarch. The governor-general was appointed for an indefinite term, serving at the pleasure of the monarch. Since Uganda was granted independence by the Uganda Independence Act 1962, rather than being first established as a semi-autonomous dominion and later promoted to independence as defined by the Statute of Westminster 1931, the governor-general was to be always appointed solely on the advice of the Cabinet of Uganda without the involvement of the British government. As Uganda became a republic before Walter Coutts, the former colonial governor, was replaced, this has never happened. In the event of a vacancy, the chief justice would have served as the officer administering the government under a dormant commission.

No.	Portrait	Name (Birth–Death)	Term of office			Monarch	Prime minister(s)
No.	Portrait	Name (Birth–Death)	Took office	Left office	Time in office	Monarch	Prime minister(s)
1		Walter Coutts (1912–1988)	9 October 1962	9 October 1963	1 year	Elizabeth II	Obote

== Elective monarchy (1963–1966) ==
Under the 1963 Constitution of the Sovereign State of Uganda, the British monarch was replaced as ceremonial head of state by an elective monarch with the title of president. The president was elected by the Parliament for a 5-year term from among the kings of Uganda’s five kingdoms and constitutional heads of districts, which were the monarchs of the non-federated entities. (Note: As of 1966, these were the Laloyo Maber of Acholi, the Won Nyaci of Lango, the Umuinga of Bugisu, the Lopirigo of Madi, the Rutakirwa Engabo of Kigezi and the Kingoo of Sebei.) In the event of a vacancy the Vice President served as acting president.

No.	Portrait	Name (Birth–Death)	Reign			Royal house	Prime minister(s)
No.	Portrait	Name (Birth–Death)	Reign start	Reign end	Duration	Royal house	Prime minister(s)
1		Edward Mutesa II (1924–1969)	9 October 1963	25 May 1966 (Deposed in a coup) (Note: On 24 February 1966, Obote announced the suspension of Mutesa from his duties as president, citing his reaction to the lost counties referendum, his ordering of troop movements without ministerial consultation, and his seeking of foreign military support. On 4 March, Obote declared he would assume the powers of the presidency.)	2 years, 228 days	Abalasangeye	Obote

== Republic (1966–present) ==
Political parties

Uganda People's Congress (UPC)
National Resistance Movement (NRM)

Other factions

Military
Independent

Status

Denotes acting president

=== First Republic (1966–1971) ===
Under the 1966 "pigeon hole" constitution, the Sovereign State was abolished and replaced by the Republic of Uganda. The presidential office was transformed from a monarchical to an executive republican one. The president and vice-president were elected by the National Assembly. The powers of the president were increased, with the establishment of the executive presidency, but the same rules applied concerning the vacancy of the president. It also applied to the 1967 and 1995 constitutions.

No.	Portrait	Name (Birth–Death)	Elected	Term of office			Political party	Prime minister(s)
No.	Portrait	Name (Birth–Death)	Elected	Took office	Left office	Time in office	Political party	Prime minister(s)
—		Milton Obote (1925–2005)	—	4 March 1966	15 April 1966	42 days	UPC	Himself
2		Milton Obote (1925–2005)	—	15 April 1966	25 January 1971 (Deposed in a coup)	4 years, 285 days	UPC	Position abolished

=== Second Republic (1971–1979) ===
General (later field marshal) Idi Amin led a coup d'état that overthrew President Obote and his government and installed himself as president.

No.	Portrait	Name (Birth–Death)	Term of office			Military	Prime minister(s)
No.	Portrait	Name (Birth–Death)	Took office	Left office	Time in office	Military	Prime minister(s)
3		Field Marshal; Idi Amin (1928–2003)	25 January 1971	11 April 1979 (Deposed by Tanzanian invasion)	8 years, 76 days	Uganda Army	Position abolished

=== Third Republic (1979–1985) ===
No.	Portrait	Name (Birth–Death)	Elected	Term of office			Political party	Prime minister(s)
No.	Portrait	Name (Birth–Death)	Elected	Took office	Left office	Time in office	Political party	Prime minister(s)
4		Yusuf Lule (1912–1985)	—	13 April 1979	20 June 1979 (Deposed in a coup)	68 days	Independent (UNLF)	Position abolished
5		Godfrey Binaisa (1920–2010)	—	20 June 1979	12 May 1980 (Deposed in a coup)	327 days	UPC (UNLF)	Position abolished
6		Paulo Muwanga (1924–1991)	—	12 May 1980	22 May 1980 (Resigned)	10 days	UPC (UNLF)	Position abolished
—		Presidential Commission	—	22 May 1980	15 December 1980	207 days	—	Position abolished
7		Milton Obote (1925–2005)	1980	17 December 1980	27 July 1985 (Deposed in a coup)	4 years, 222 days	UPC	Allimadi

=== Military rule (1985–1986) ===
General Bazilio Olara-Okello led a coup d'état that overthrew President Obote and his government. Following the coup, Okello proclaimed himself president.

No.	Portrait	Name (Birth–Death)	Term of office			Military	Prime minister(s)
No.	Portrait	Name (Birth–Death)	Took office	Left office	Time in office	Military	Prime minister(s)
—		General; Bazilio Olara-Okello (1929–1990)	27 July 1985	29 July 1985 (Resigned)	2 days	UNLF	Position vacant
8		General; Tito Okello (1914–1996)	29 July 1985	26 January 1986 (Deposed by civil war)	181 days	UNLF	Muwanga; Waligo

=== Fourth Republic (1986–present) ===
Under the Constitution of Uganda, the president is the executive head of state. The president is elected by popular vote for a five-year term. In the event of a vacancy, the vice president serves as acting president under a dormant commission.

No.	Portrait	Name (Birth–Death)	Elected	Term of office			Political party	Prime minister(s)
No.	Portrait	Name (Birth–Death)	Elected	Took office	Left office	Time in office	Political party	Prime minister(s)
9		Yoweri Museveni (born 1944)	1996; 2001; 2006; 2011; 2016; 2021; 2026	26 January 1986	Incumbent	40 years, 286 days	NRM	Kisekka; Adyebo; Musoke; Nsibambi; Mbabazi; Rugunda; Nabbanja
