= Prime Minister of Uganda =

Chairperson of the Cabinet

Prime Minister of the Republic of Uganda
- Coat of arms of Uganda

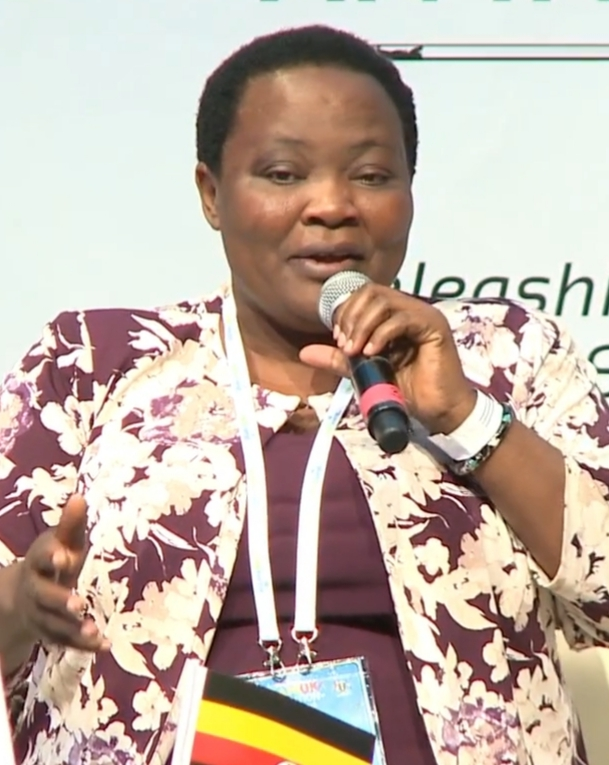
- Incumbent; Robinah Nabbanja since 21 June 2021
- Style: The Right Honourable
- Abbreviation: PM
- Member of: Cabinet
- Residence: Kampala
- Appointer: President of Uganda
- Term length: 5 years
- Inaugural holder: Milton Obote
- Formation: 9 October 1962
- Deputy: Deputy Prime Minister of Uganda
- Website: opm.go.ug

The prime minister of Uganda chairs the Cabinet of Uganda, although the president is the effective head of government. The prime minister is appointed by the president with the approval of Parliament.

Robinah Nabbanja has been the prime minister since 21 June 2021.

== History ==
The post of prime minister was created for the first time in 1962. In 1966, Prime Minister Milton Obote suspended the Constitution, abolished the post of prime minister, and declared himself president. In 1980, the post of prime minister was re-established.

== Office ==
The headquarters of the office of the prime minister of Uganda are located in the Twin Towers on Sir Apollo Kaggwa Road, in the Central Division of Kampala, Uganda's capital and largest city. The coordinates of the headquarters are 0°18'58.0"N, 32°35'13.0"E (Latitude:0.316111; Longitude:32.586944).

== List of officeholders ==
Political parties

Democratic Party (DP)
Uganda People's Congress (UPC)
National Resistance Movement (NRM)

Other factions

Independent

Status

Denotes acting prime minister

=== Chief minister of Uganda Protectorate ===
No.	Portrait	Name (Birth–Death)	Election	Term of office			Political party	Monarch
No.	Portrait	Name (Birth–Death)	Election	Took office	Left office	Time in office	Political party	Monarch
1		Benedicto Kiwanuka (1922–1972)	1961	2 July 1961	1 March 1962	242 days	DP	Elizabeth II

=== Prime ministers of Uganda Protectorate ===
No.	Portrait	Name (Birth–Death)	Election	Term of office			Political party	Monarch
No.	Portrait	Name (Birth–Death)	Election	Took office	Left office	Time in office	Political party	Monarch
1		Benedicto Kiwanuka (1922–1972)	—	1 March 1962	30 April 1962	60 days	DP	Elizabeth II
2		Milton Obote (1925–2005)	1962	30 April 1962	9 October 1962	162 days	UPC	Elizabeth II

=== Prime ministers of Uganda ===
No.	Portrait	Name (Birth–Death)	Election	Term of office			Political party	Head(s) of state
No.	Portrait	Name (Birth–Death)	Election	Took office	Left office	Time in office	Political party	Head(s) of state
1		Milton Obote (1925–2005)	—	9 October 1962	9 October 1963	3 years, 144 days	UPC	Elizabeth II
1		Milton Obote (1925–2005)	—	9 October 1963	2 March 1966	3 years, 144 days	UPC	Mutesa
1		Milton Obote (1925–2005)	—	2 March 1966	15 April 1966	44 days	UPC	Himself
Post abolished (15 April 1966 – 18 December 1980)
2		Otema Allimadi (1929–2001)	1980	18 December 1980	27 July 1985 (Deposed in a coup)	4 years, 221 days	UPC	Obote
3		Paulo Muwanga (1921–1991)	—	1 August 1985	25 August 1985	24 days	Independent	Okello
4		Abraham Waligo (1928–2000)	—	25 August 1985	26 January 1986 (Deposed by civil war)	154 days	Independent	Okello
5		Samson Kisekka (1912–1999)	1989	30 January 1986	22 January 1991	4 years, 357 days	NRM	Museveni
6		George Cosmas Adyebo (1947–2000)	1994	22 January 1991	18 November 1994	3 years, 300 days	NRM	Museveni
7		Kintu Musoke (born 1938)	1996	18 November 1994	5 April 1999	4 years, 138 days	NRM	Museveni
8		Apolo Nsibambi (1940–2019)	2001; 2006; 2011	5 April 1999	24 May 2011	12 years, 49 days	NRM	Museveni
9		Amama Mbabazi (born 1949)	—	24 May 2011	18 September 2014	3 years, 117 days	NRM	Museveni
10		Ruhakana Rugunda (born 1947)	2016; 2021	18 September 2014	21 June 2021	6 years, 276 days	NRM	Museveni
11		Robinah Nabbanja (born 1969)	2026	21 June 2021	Incumbent	5 years, 78 days	NRM	Museveni

== Organisational structure ==
As of October 2016, the Office of the Prime Minister oversaw several cabinet ministries and sub-ministries, including:

1. First Deputy Prime Minister: Moses Ali
2. Minister in Charge of General Duties, Office of the Prime Minister: Mary Karooro Okurut
3. Ministry for Karamoja Affairs: headed by Minister John Byabagambi
4. Minister of State for Karamoja Affairs: Moses Kizige
5. Ministry of Disaster Preparedness and Refugees: headed by Minister Hilary Onek
6. Minister of State for Disaster Preparedness and Refugees: Musa Ecweru
7. Government Chief Whip: Ruth Nankabirwa
8. Minister of State for the Northern Region: Grace Kwiyucwiny
9. Minister of State for Luwero Triangle: Dennis Galabuzi Ssozi
10. Minister of State for Teso Affairs: Agnes Akiror
11. Minister of State for Bunyoro Affairs: Ernest Kiiza

The Office of the Prime Minister is supported by a Permanent Secretary as part of its administrative structure. Past holders of the office include Pius Bigirimana, who served from October 2008 to June 2013.

== See also ==
- President of Uganda
- List of heads of state of Uganda
- Vice President of Uganda
- Deputy Prime Minister of Uganda
- Politics of Uganda
- History of Uganda
- Political parties of Uganda
