= Abraham Waligo =

Ugandan politician

Abraham Pelleh Waligo

4th Prime Minister of Uganda
- In office 25 August 1985 – 26 January 1986
- Preceded by: Paulo Muwanga
- Succeeded by: Samson Kisekka

Personal details
- Born: 28 July 1928
- Died: 6 March 2000 (aged 71)
- Party: National Resistance Movement (NRM)
- Education: Electrical Engineering, South Africa and United Kingdom
- Occupation: Engineer, Politician

Abraham Pelleh Waligo (28 July 1928 – 6 March 2000) was the 4th Prime Minister of Uganda from 25 August 1985 to 26 January 1986.

== Biography ==
Waligo completed his secondary education at Kings College Buddo and then studied electrical engineering in South Africa and the United Kingdom. After graduating in 1955, he was the first electrical engineer in Central and Eastern Africa. After a two-year vocational training program at various UK power utilities, he returned to his home country in 1957 and became chief engineer of the Electricity Authority (UEB). In 1969, Waligo founded an engineering office. In addition, he has been involved in the association of engineers and in the field of higher education for engineers. Later, he also held the position of managing director of Uganda Airlines.

== Political Life ==
Abraham Waligo first entered formal politics in 1979 as Minister of Works and Housing under President Godfrey Binaisa. During his subsequent political career, Waligo was Minister of Housing and Urban Development and Minister of Finance.

Waligo served as prime minister from 25 August 1985 to 26 January 1986, under General Tito Okello's Military Council, succeeding former President Paulo Muwanga. He was a principal signatory to the Nairobi Peace Agreement which outlined a ceasefire, power-sharing mechanisms and integration of NRA forces into the Uganda National Liberation Army on December 17, 1985, representing the government as Prime Minister and Minister of Finance.

== See Also ==
- Milton Obote
- Samson Kisekka
- Apolo Nsibambi
- Amama Mbabazi

Political offices
Preceded by Paulo Muwanga	Prime Minister of Uganda; 25 August 1985 - 26 January 1986	Succeeded by Samson Kisekka
