= Constitution of Uganda =

Supreme law of Uganda

Constitution of the Republic of Uganda, 1995

Overview
- Jurisdiction: Uganda
- Ratified: 22 September 1995
- Date effective: 8 October 1995
- System: Unitary presidential republic

Government structure
- Branches: Three
- Chambers: Unicameral (Parliament)
- Executive: President
- Judiciary: Supreme Court

History
- Amendments: 4
- Last amended: 5 January 2018
- Author: Uganda Constitutional Commission
- Supersedes: Constitution of the Republic of Uganda, 1967

Full text
- Constitution of the Republic of Uganda at Wikisource

The Constitution of Uganda is the supreme law of Uganda. The fourth and current constitution was promulgated on 8 October 1995. It sanctions a republican form of government with a powerful President.

The first Constitution was adopted in 1962 only to be replaced 4 years later in 1966. The 1966 Constitution, passed in a tense political environment and without debate, was replaced in 1967. Before it was succeeded by the 1995 Constitution, the 1967 Constitution suffered various periods of suspension, either in full or in part.

In 2005, the Constitution was amended to provide for a multi-party political system.

== First constitution (1962–1966) ==
The first constitution in Uganda was the product of the Ugandan Constitutional Conference and took effect at the moment of independence (9 October 1962). It provided for a system of Parliamentary democracy underpinned by constitutional supremacy. It provided for a complex system of devolution within Uganda: the Kingdom of Buganda gained particularly strong powers of self-government; the Kingdoms of Bunyoro, Acoli, Tooro and Ankole, and the Territory of Busoga also gained the status of "federal states" and were permitted to retain their own legislatures; while the remaining districts and the territory of Mbale were controlled directly by the central government. The 1962 constitution provided for most members of Parliament to be elected directly. The sole exception to this rule was Buganda, where MPs were selected by an electoral college made up of members of the Lukiiko (Buganda's own sub-national Parliament).

The 1962 constitution was amended three times: first, and most importantly, it was amended in 1963 to replace Queen Elizabeth II (represented by the Governor-General of Uganda, Sir Walter Coutts) as the head of state with the largely ceremonial position of President, elected from among the traditional rulers and constitutional heads of districts; in 1964 it was amended to make minor changes to the date on which the Legislative Assembly of the Kingdom of Tooro should stand dissolved; and in January 1965 it was amended for a third and final time to give effect to the outcome of the lost counties referendum.

From 1963 to 1966, Uganda was referred to as the 'Sovereign State of Uganda', because of the strong monarchical element in the Ugandan constitutional set-up.

== Second constitution (1966–1967) ==
In February 1966, and 1967 during the political crisis that surrounded the gold scandal, the then Prime Minister (and Head of Government) Milton Obote suspended the first constitution, making himself both Head of State and Head of Government shortly after. On 15 April a new constitution was promulgated. This invisible "pigeonhole constitution" (so named because copies of it were posted in the pigeonholes of Members of Parliament) was overtly intended as a temporary measure "until such time as a Constituent Assembly established by Parliament enacts a Constitution in place of this Constitution". While repeating verbatim many aspects of the 1962 constitution, the 1966 constitution relabelled the position of leader of the party having the greatest numerical strength in the National Assembly as the "President". The 1966 constitution also downgraded the status of Buganda to bring it into line with the status of the other historic kingdoms, for example by retracting Buganda's previous privilege of indirectly, rather than directly, electing members to the Ugandan Parliament and abolishing the High Court of Buganda. Buganda refused to accept the new constitution, resulting in the exile of the Kabaka Mutesa II (who until the crisis had been serving as Uganda's first President) and the postponement of national elections under 1971. The first amendment to the 1966 constitution came into force on 3 June 1966, bringing Buganda into even closer alignment with the kingdoms of Bunyoro, Acoli, Tooro and Ankole, but downgrading Busoga to the status of a district.

== Third constitution (1967–1995) ==
This constitution renamed Uganda as the 'Republic of Uganda'.

The third constitution was promulgated on 8 September 1967 following three months of debate by a Constituent Assembly formed of members of the National Assembly. It was, in real terms, an amended version of the 1966 constitution but abolished all traditional rulers and all local legislatures and considerably expanded the power of the executive (at that time headed by Obote) at the expense of the legislature. Although the constitution notionally gave rise to a Parliamentary democracy, in practice the National Assembly had little influence. In 1969, the UPC was formally declared to be Uganda's only official party to create a one-party state.

The third constitution was partially suspended under Idi Amin by virtue of Legal Notice No. 1 of 1971 and largely ignored during his presidency. In particular, since the notice suspended Article 1 (supremacy of the constitution), it paved for the way for Amin to rule by decree. Further constitutional changes by made by the Constitution (Modification) Decree No. 5 of 1971, which provided that all executive powers were to be exercisable by Chairman of the Defence Council (a title Amin himself held) and the Parliament (Vesting of Powers) Decree No. 8 of 1971, which vested legislative powers in Amin and his council of Ministers.

The legal status of the 1967 constitution following Amin's overthrow in 1979 was not clear. Legal Notice No. 1 of 1979 nullified Legal Notice No. 1 of 1971, and fundamentally recognised the 1967 Constitution as once again supreme, but also suspended parts of it and transferred numerous executive powers to incoming President Yusuf Lule. All legislative powers referred to in the Constitution were to be vested in the National Consultative Council (NCC) until such a time as a Legislative Assembly could be elected. Despite this, the NCC favoured going further and abandoning the 1967 Constitution altogether. This disagreement contributed to the NCC replacing Lule with Godfrey Binaisa in June 1979. Shortly after, Legal Notice No. 5 of 1980 provided for the establishment of a Presidential Commission. It expressly provided that "where any conflict arises between the provisions of this Proclamation and the provisions of the Constitution of Uganda or any other written law, the provisions of this Proclamation shall prevail".

The 1967 Constitution was formally revived by Obote on his return to power in late 1980, but following his overthrow by Bazilio Olara-Okello in July 1985, the constitution was suspended once more. On seizing power in 1986, the National Resistance Army, under the leadership of Yoweri Museveni, confirmed that the 1967 constitution was supreme but partially suspended. In particular, the provisions in the constitution relating to the existence of a national Parliament and the election of the President were suspended for four years (later extended to eight). The detail of this suspension was set out in Legal Notice No. 1 of 1986, which nullified Legal Notice No. 1 of 1979 and invested executive powers in Museveni directly.

== Fourth constitution (1995–present) ==
In 1988, the National Resistance Council established the Uganda Constitutional Commission and tasked it with reviewing the 1967 constitution and developing a new constitution. The mandate of the commission was to consult the people and make proposals for a democratic permanent constitution based on national consensus. In its final report of December 1992, the Commission recommended that the new constitution be agreed by a mostly-elected Constituent Assembly. Elections to the Constituent Assembly took place in March 1994.

The output of that process, Uganda's fourth constitution, dated 22 September 1995, was adopted by the Assembly on 27 September and promulgated on 8 October. Much more detailed than the previous constitutions, it sanctions a republican form of government with a powerful President. Compared to the 1967 constitution, however, the 1995 constitution more overtly attempts to achieve a balance of power between the executive, legislature, and other bodies whose independence is guaranteed by the constitution. For example, under the latter, ministerial appointments and government borrowing must be approved by Parliament; and the civil service is appointed by the independent Public Services Commission and Judicial Service Commission. The President no longer has the power to dissolve Parliament and Parliament can override a presidential veto with a two-thirds majority. The 1995 constitution stresses the notion of an independent judiciary, with the Supreme Court as the final court of appeal.

The 1995 Constitution of Uganda has restored all the traditional monarchies, except for the Kingdom of Ankole, but limits the Ugandan monarchs' powers to cultural matters only.

Amendments in 2005 removed presidential term limits and legalized a multi-party political system. However, amendments were made and the new presidential age limits were removed in 2018.

Pursuant to Article 102, a person to qualify for election as president must be a citizen of Uganda by birth, not younger than thirty-five and qualified to be a member of Parliament.
