= Gilbert Bukenya =

Vice President of Uganda from 2003 to 2011

Gilbert Bukenya DR
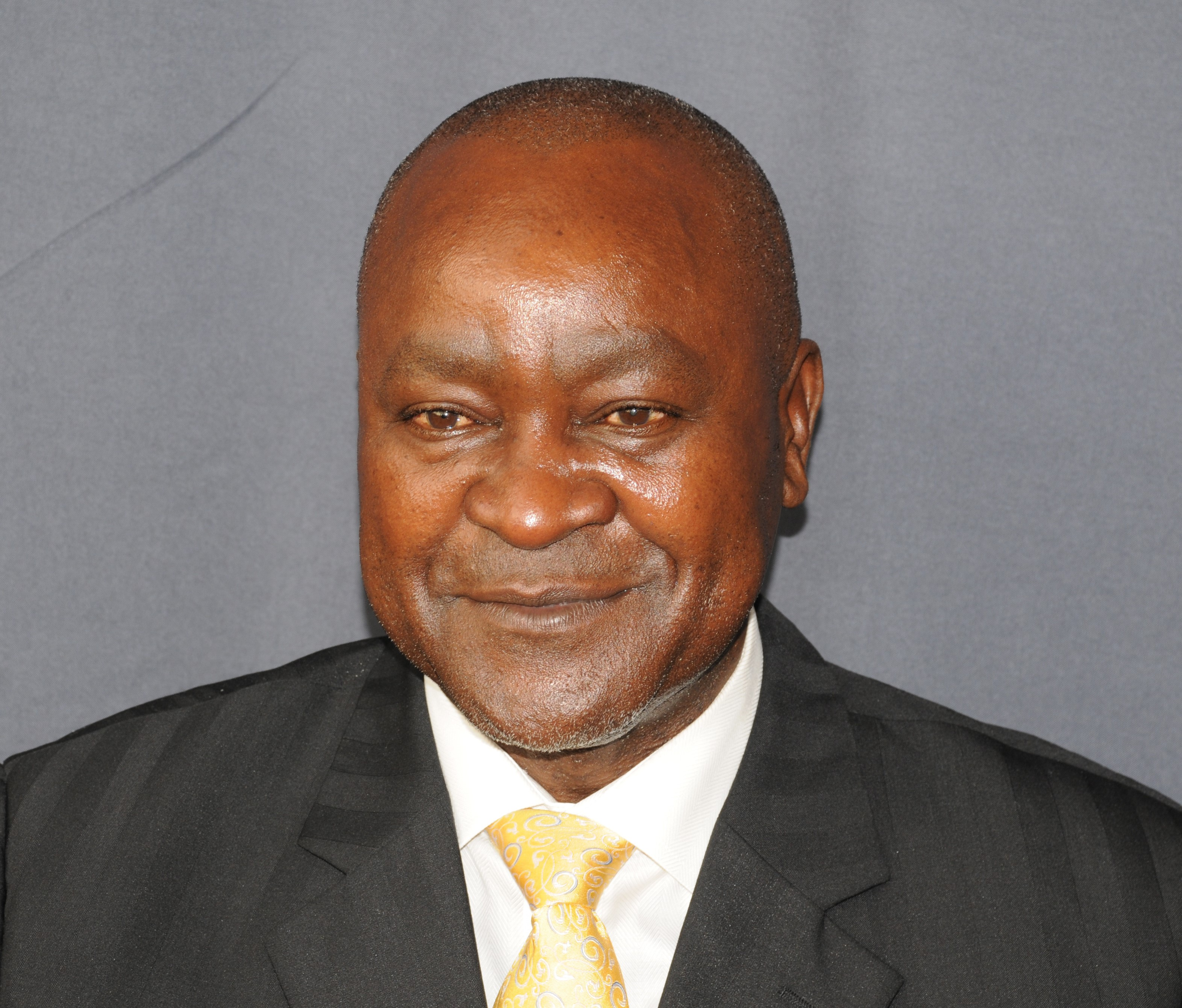
- Bukenya in 2010

7th Vice President of Uganda
- In office May 2003 – May 2011
- President: Yoweri Museveni
- Preceded by: Specioza Kazibwe
- Succeeded by: Edward Ssekandi

Member of the Parliament of Uganda for Busiro North
- Incumbent
- Assumed office 1997

Minister in Charge of the Presidency
- In office 2001–2003

Minister of State for Trade
- In office 2000–2001

Dean of the Makerere University School of Medicine
- In office 1995–1996

Director Makerere University Institute of Public Health
- In office 1991–1995

Personal details
- Born: Gilbert Balibaseka Bukenya; 5 August 1949 (age 77) Lwantama, Wakiso District, Protectorate of Uganda
- Party: National Resistance Movement
- Education: Makerere University School of Medicine (Bachelor of Medicine and Bachelor of Surgery); Royal Institute of Public Health (Diploma in Public Health); London School of Hygiene and Tropical Medicine (MSc in Community Health); University of Queensland (PhD in Public Health)
- Profession: Physician, university professor, politician, farmer, businessman

Gilbert Balibaseka Bukenya (born 5 August 1949) is a Ugandan politician and physician who was the 7th vice president of Uganda from 23 May 2003 until 23 May 2011. He has represented the constituency of Busiro County North in the Ugandan Parliament since 1996 until 2016. In February 2024, President Yoweri Museveni appointed him as the Senior Presidential Advisor on environment and sanitation. His autobiography, Intricate Corridors to Power, was published in 2008.

== Early life and education ==
Gilbert Bukenya was born on 5 August 1949, in the village of Lwantama in Kakiri sub-county, in Busiro County, in present-day Wakiso District, about 30 kilometres (19 mi), by road, northwest of Kampala, Uganda's capital and largest city. He was educated by the Brothers of Christian Instruction order in Uganda. He had his early education at Saint Savio Primary School, Kisubi, Saint Mary's College Kisubi, Saint Edward Secondary School, Bukuumi and Old Kampala Secondary School.

Later, he joined Makerere University School of Medicine in 1971, graduating in 1976 with the Bachelor of Medicine and Bachelor of Surgery (MBChB). He worked as a Medical Officer at Mbale Hospital up to 1982 when he left Uganda for Papua New Guinea.

While outside Uganda, he obtained a Diploma in Public Health from the Royal Institute of Public Health, in London, in 1982. He also attained the degrees of Master of Science (MSc) from the London School of Hygiene and Tropical Medicine in United Kingdom, and Doctor of Philosophy (PhD) from the University of Queensland, with a thesis topic of The Epidemiology of Under-Five Childhood Diarrhoeas in a Peri-Urban Population of Papua New Guinea.

== Career ==
Gilbert Bukenya returned to Uganda as a Professor of Medicine and was appointed dean of Makerere University School of Medicine, a position he held from 1994 until 1996. In 1996 he entered politics and was elected Member of Parliament (MP) for Busiro North constituency. He also served as chairman of the National Resistance Movement (NRM) parliamentary caucus. During this period he is credited for having managed to defuse the tension that was boiling up between President Yoweri Museveni and other historical leaders of the ruling NRM. He was chairman of the NRM in the Buganda region. Bukenya subsequently became Minister of State for Trade and Industry before being elevated to the post of Minister of the Presidency. He became Vice President in 2003 replacing Specioza Kazibwe, who at the time was grappling with a failed marriage. He later stood for the post of Secretary General of the NRM and lost to Amama Mbabazi. In May 2011, he was replaced as Vice President of Uganda by Edward Ssekandi.

In September 2007, Bukenya delivered the key speeches at the Ugandan North American Association (UNAA) convention in San Francisco, California.

== Personal life ==
Gilbert is married to Doctor Margaret Bukenya, a classmate at Makerere Medical School in the early 1970s. He is a member of the Catholic Church. In 2005, Bukenya surprised political watchers when he alleged that the government was being controlled by a mafia clique. In an interview with the Daily Monitor, he said that the mafia was plotting his downfall. This was attributed to his ever-increasing popularity and his closeness to the powerful Catholic Church in Uganda. He is reported to enjoy swimming and farming. He is credited with the introduction of the cultivation of upland rice, also known as NERICA in Uganda.

== Published works ==
- Through intricate corridors to power. Fountain Publishers. 2008. ISBN 9789970028108.

== See also ==
- Cabinet of Uganda
- Parliament of Uganda
- Government of Uganda
- CHOGM 2007
- St. Lawrence University

Political offices
Preceded by Specioza Kazibwe	Vice President of Uganda; 2003–2011	Succeeded by Edward Ssekandi
