= Jeninah Ntabgoba =

Ugandan legislator, Member of Parliament and Author

Jeninah Ntabgoba Honourable

Woman Member of Parliament, Kisoro District (1989)

Constituent Assembly Delegate (CAD), Kisoro District May 1994 - July 1995

Woman Member of Parliament, Kisoro District 1996 - 2001
- Succeeded by: Annette Mukebera

Personal details
- Born: Jeninah Mary Nyirandimubakunzi
- Occupation: Politician; Author

Jeninah Ntabgoba (at times referred to Jeninah M.N Ntabgoba) is a Ugandan author and former legislator. She was the elected Woman Constituent Assembly Delegate for Kisoro District in the 1994 Constitutional Assembly and later represented the same constituency as a Member of Parliament in Uganda's sixth parliament between 1996 and 2001 when she was replaced by Annette Mukabera in the 2001 Ugandan General Election.

== Career ==
Ntabgoba participated in the 1989 Ugandan general election and was one of the 280 elected Members of Parliament on the National Resistance Council. She was the Woman Representative for Kisoro District.

During the 1994 Ugandan Constituent Assembly elections, Ntabgoba was elected to represent the Women of Kisoro District. She later successfully contested for the position of Woman Member of Parliament for the same constituency and represented it inUganda's sixth parliament.

She was succeeded by Annette Mukabera after defeat in the 2001 Ugandan parliamentary elections.

== Personal life ==
Born Jeninah Mary Nyirandimubakunzi, Ntabgoba was married to former Principal Judge Herbert Ntabgoba

== See also ==
- Kisoro district
- Parliament of Uganda
