= Presidential Commission =

Presidential Commission may refer to:

- Presidential Commission (Ireland)
- Presidential commission (United States)
- Presidential Commission of Inquiry
- Presidential Commission of Uganda
- Presidential Commission of Ghana
- Presidential Commission on the Status of Women
- Presidential Commission for the Study of the Communist Dictatorship in Romania
- Presidential Commission of the Russian Federation to Counter Attempts to Falsify History to the Detriment of Russia's Interests
