= Otema Allimadi =

Ugandan politician

Prime Minister of Uganda
- In office 18 December 1980 – 27 July 1985
- President: Milton Obote
- Preceded by: Milton Obote (1966)
- Succeeded by: Paulo Muwanga

Minister of Foreign Affairs of Uganda
- In office 11 April 1979 – 18 December 1980
- Preceded by: Idi Amin
- Succeeded by: Milton Obote

Ambassador of Uganda to the United States
- In office 1966 – 25 January 1971
- Preceded by: Dr. Solomon Bayo Asea
- Succeeded by: Mustapha Ramathan

Personal details
- Born: 11 February 1929 Kitgum, Northern Region, Uganda
- Died: 5 August 2001 (aged 72) Kampala, Uganda
- Party: Uganda People's Congress; Uganda People's Democratic Movement
- Children: Milton Allimadi; Barbara Allimadi

Erifasi Otema Allimadi (11 February 1929 – 5 August 2001) was a Ugandan politician who served as the country's Foreign Minister (1979–1980) in the UNLF government and later on as the country's third Prime Minister of Uganda (1980–1985) in the UPC government.

After the ousting of the regime, he fled the country before returning to Uganda.

== Biography ==
Allimadi was ambassador to the United States from 1966 to 1971. He also served as Permanent Representative to the United Nations. He was Minister of Foreign Affairs during the government of President Godfrey Binaisa from 20 June 1979 to 11 May 1980. After Paulo Muwanga's transitional governments and a three-member presidential commission, he was then appointed prime minister by newly elected President Milton Obote on 18 December 1980. He retained that office until the fall of Obote by Lieutenant General Bazilio Olara Okello on 27 July 1985.

In his exile in London, Allamadi led the Uganda People's Democratic Movement, which served as the political wing of the armed group Uganda People's Democratic Army. In January 1992 he would return to Uganda.

He had 17 children; his son Milton Allimadi is a Ugandan American professor, author and journalist, while his daughter Barbara Allimadi, was an activist associated with the Alliance for National Transformation.

Political offices
Preceded by Milton Obote	Prime Minister of Uganda; 18 December 1980 – 27 July 1985	Succeeded by Paulo Muwanga
