= Irene Marjorie Kabamori =

Wife of President of Uganda (1937–2003)

Irene Marjorie Kabamori (1937 – 23 January 2003) was the second wife of Godfrey Lukongwa Binaisa, who served as the fifth President of Uganda from June 1979 to May 1980.

== Early life and Marriage ==
Irene comes from Tooro region and was associated with the noble Bagahi clan. She married Godfrey Binaisa during his tenure as Uganda's first indigenous Attorney General, a position he held from 1962 to 1968. She was a professional nurse whose medical background was significant during her tenure as First Lady, as she served Uganda during a period of political and economic instability following Idi Amin's regime.

== Illness and death ==
In 1992, Irene suffered a stroke and later developed breast cancer. She died on 23 January 2003 in London at the age of 65. A funeral service was held at Namirembe Cathedral in Kampala, attended by hundreds of mourners.
