= Paulo Muwanga =

Ugandan politician (1924–1991)

- Paulo Muwanga

6th President of Uganda
- In office 12 May 1980 – 22 May 1980
- Preceded by: Godfrey Binaisa
- Succeeded by: Presidential Commission

4th Vice President of Uganda
- In office December 1980 – July 1985
- President: Milton Obote
- Preceded by: Mustafa Adrisi
- Succeeded by: Samson Kisekka

3rd Prime Minister of Uganda
- In office 1 August 1985 – 25 August 1985
- President: Tito Okello
- Preceded by: Otema Allimadi
- Succeeded by: Abraham Waligo

Personal details
- Born: Paulo Frobisher Muwanga Seddugge Muyanja; 4 April 1924
- Died: 1 April 1991 (aged 66) Kampala, Uganda
- Party: Uganda People's Congress

Paulo Frobisher Muwanga Seddugge Muyanja (4 April 1924 – 1 April 1991) was a Ugandan politician who served briefly as de facto president, and later as prime minister, of Uganda.

He served as a chairman of the presidential commission that governed Uganda from May to December 1980 and was briefly the country's de facto head of state during the transition following the removal of President Godfrey Binaisa.

== Career ==
Paulo Frobisher Muwanga Seddugge Muyanja was born in Uganda on 4 April 1924. (Note: Older sources reported 1925 or 1921.) He joined the East African Posts and Telecommunications Administration (1943–50) before entering politics in 1950. He served as a member of Parliament from 1962 to 1964, alongside his fellow party member A.G. Mehta, before becoming ambassador to Egypt (1964–70) and France (1970–72). He was then in exile in England from 1972 to 1978, before returning to fight in the Uganda–Tanzania War (1978–9). He served briefly as minister of internal affairs, first under Yusuf Lule and then under Godfrey Binaisa. Binaisa attempted to have Muwanga demoted to an ambassador in February 1980, but Muwanga appealed directly to the National Consultative Commission. He was reappointed, this time as minister of labour, the same month, and held that position until May 1980.

On 12 May 1980, the army overthrew Binaisa and installed a six-man Military Commission headed by Muwanga. The commission was the de facto president of Uganda for a few days until the establishment of the Presidential Commission of Uganda. That commission, with Muwanga as chairman, held the powers of the president of Uganda between 22 May and 15 December 1980.

Following the elections held on 10 December 1980, Muwanga installed himself as the head of the Electoral Commission and declared Milton Obote's Uganda People's Congress the winner. The election results were contested, leading Yoweri Museveni to undertake a guerilla war in protest.

Between 1980 and 1985, he served as Vice President of Uganda and minister of defence under Obote. He was briefly prime minister of Uganda (1 August – 25 August 1985) under President Tito Okello, before being succeeded by Abraham Waligo.

He was arrested in October 1986, acquitted in 1988, and detained again 1989–90. He died on 1 April 1991, aged 66.

== Personal life ==
He was married to Nalongo Kasalina Zawedde Muwanga

British actress Zawe Ashton is his granddaughter.

== Explanatory notes ==
Political offices
| Preceded by Godfrey Binaisa | President of Uganda; 12–22 May 1980 | Succeeded by Presidential Commission of Uganda |
| Preceded by Otema Allimadi | Prime Minister of Uganda; 1 August 1985 – 25 August 1985 | Succeeded by Abraham Waligo |

== See also ==
- Uganda since 1979, part of the History of Uganda series.
- President of Uganda
- Politics of Uganda
- Political parties of Uganda
