= Specioza Kazibwe =

Ugandan politician

Speciosa Kazibwe
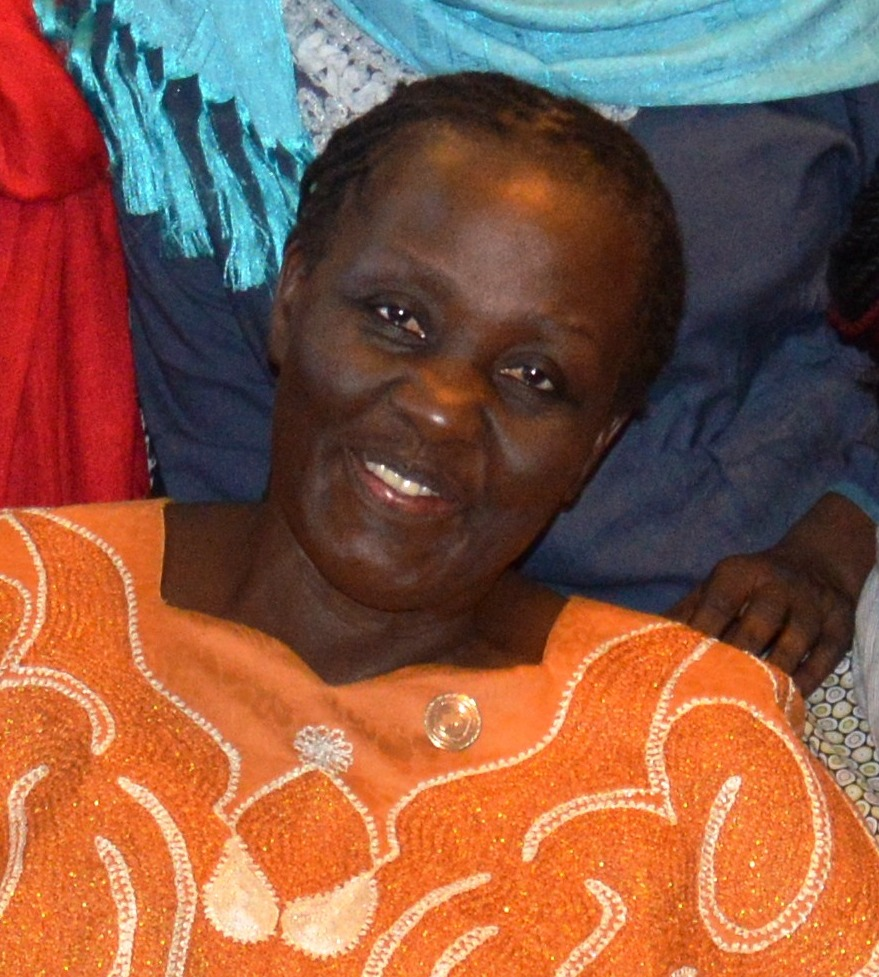
- Kazibwe in 2015

6th Vice President of Uganda
- In office 18 November 1994 – 21 May 2003
- President: Yoweri Museveni
- Preceded by: Samson Kisekka
- Succeeded by: Gilbert Bukenya

Personal details
- Born: 1 July 1954 (age 72) Iganga, Protectorate of Uganda
- Party: Democratic Party
- Education: Makerere University

Speciosa Naigaga Wandira Kazibwe (born 1 July 1954) is a Ugandan politician and first female vice president in Africa. She was the sixth vice president of Uganda from 1994 to 2003, making her the first woman in Africa to hold the position of vice president of a sovereign nation. Kazibwe is also a Ugandan surgeon. She is also referred to as "Nnalongo", because of her twins. In August 2013, she was appointed by United Nations Secretary-General Ban Ki-moon as United Nations Special Envoy for HIV/AIDS in Africa.

== Background and education ==
Speciosa Kazibwe was born in Iganga District on 1 July 1954.

She attended Mount Saint Mary's College Namagunga, a prestigious all-female boarding high school affiliated with the Catholic Church, located on the Kampala-Jinja Highway, near the town of Lugazi. In 1974 she entered Makerere University School of Medicine, where she studied human medicine, graduating with the Bachelor of Medicine and Bachelor of Surgery degree in 1979. She later obtained the degree of Master of Medicine, also from Makerere University Medical School, specializing in General Surgery. In 2009, she was awarded the degree of Doctor of Science (SD), by Harvard School of Public Health, Department of Population and International Health.

== Career ==
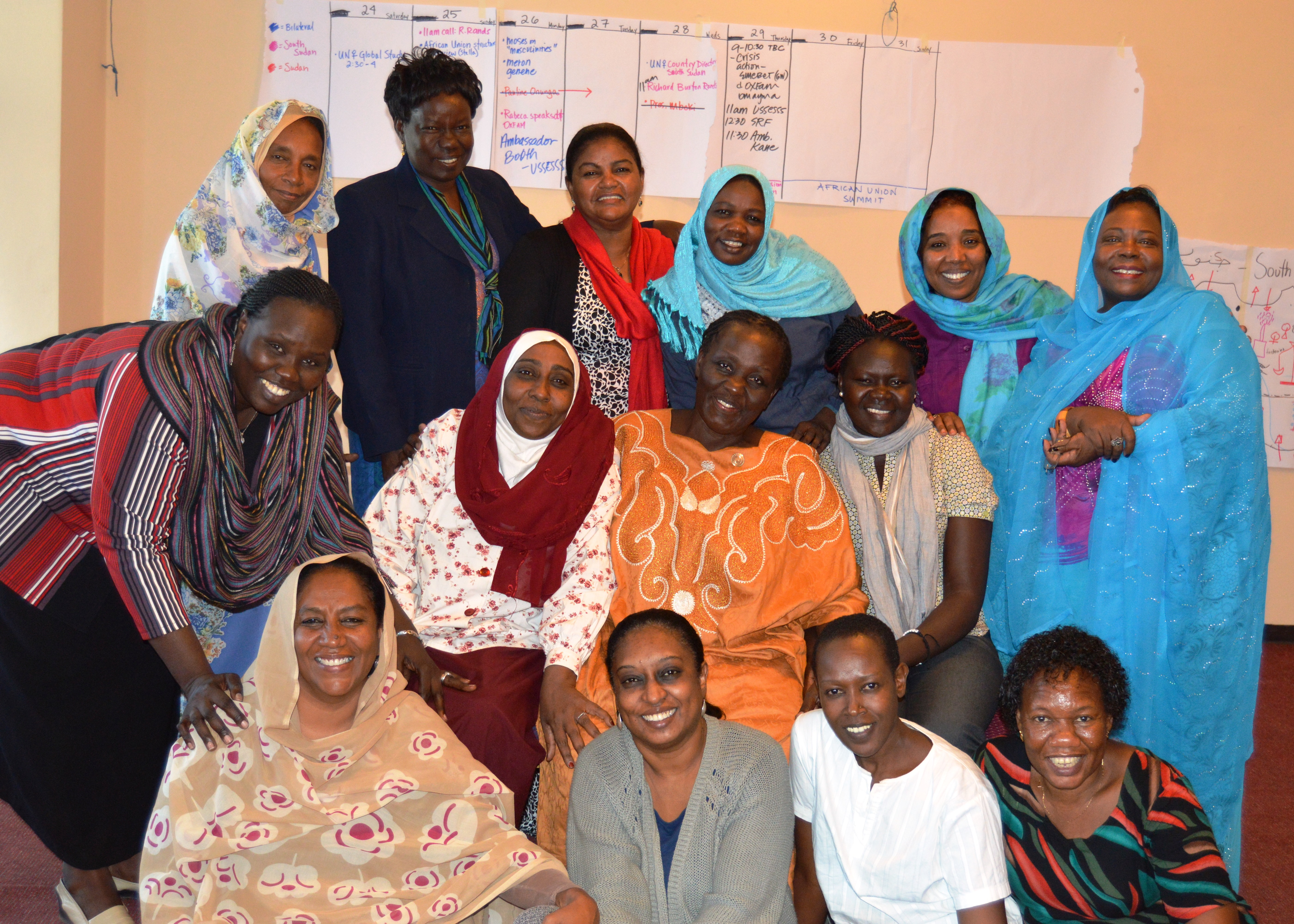
Specioza Wandira Kazibwe (center, middle row)

Kazibwe began her political career as a chairperson of halls of residence at Makerere University Kampala (1975–76), the equivalent of a university guild president, which had been abolished by then-President Idi Amin Dada. She later became a member of the youth and women's wings of the Ugandan Democratic Party. She won her first election as a village leader, on the ticket of the National Resistance Movement (NRM) in 1987. She was later elected Women's Representative for Kampala District and became chairperson of the Advisory Committee for Museveni's election campaign.

She first began serving the administration of Yoweri Museveni in 1989, when she was appointed Deputy Minister for Industry, a post she held until 1991. From 1991 until 1994, she served as Minister for Gender and Community Development. She was a member of the Constitution Assembly which drafted Uganda's new constitution in 1994. In 1996, she was elected Member of Parliament for the constituency of Kigulu South in Iganga District. From 1994 to 2003, Kazibwe served as Uganda's vice president and as Minister of Agriculture, Animal Industry and Fisheries.

Kazibwe has been an advocate for women in Africa. In collaboration with the Organization of African Unity and the United Nations Economic Commission for Africa, she founded the African Women Committee on Peace and Development (AWCPD) in 1998, an organization she has also chaired. The objective of AWCPD is to help enable women's participation in peace and development processes on the continent. Kazibwe has also been chair or a member of various national interest groups, including:

- The Senior Women's Advisory Group on the Environment
- The Uganda Women Entrepreneurs Association Limited
- The Uganda Women Doctors Association
- Agri-Energy Roundtable Uganda (AER/U)

Kazibwe chaired the inaugural conference of the AER/Uganda on 25 November 1991 at the Kampala Sheraton and also served on the Committee of Honour of the Agri-Energy Roundtable (AER) for several years, gaining wide recognition. In 1998, the Food and Agriculture Organization (FAO) awarded her the Ceres Medal for her "contribution to food security and poverty eradication".

== Claims of domestic violence ==
In April 2002, Kazibwe filed for divorce from her husband, saying that she refused to be the victim of continued domestic violence. Polygamy and wife beating are relatively common in Uganda, but divorce is relatively rare. Her husband opposed the divorce, citing his Catholic faith, and saying that his wife had come home late without giving a proper explanation, and had joined with some other politicians he did not like.

Finding it difficult to perform her political duties and deal with the increasingly messy divorce case, on Wednesday, 21 May 2003, Kazibwe stepped down from her positions in government, asking to be allowed to continue her studies. She completed a doctorate at Harvard University.

She has four children, including twins from her first marriage, and has adopted several others.

Her Lawyer Paulo Ssebalu said on 10th september, 2004, a decree was made confirming her petition to divorce her husband.The decree required that the one opposing the divorce advanced reasons within six months why it should not be made absolute. The high Court judge Elidad Mwangusya said the court was satisfied with Dr. Specioza's request to have the marriage permanently dissolved because Eng. Kazibwe did not give any reason against it.

Political offices
Preceded by Samson Kisekka	Vice President of Uganda; 1994–2003	Succeeded by Gilbert Bukenya
