= 1989 Ugandan general election =

General elections were held in Uganda between 11 and 28 February 1989 to elect members to the National Resistance Council, a legislative body established following the 1986 takeover of power by the National Resistance Movement (NRM) led by President Yoweri Museveni. The first elections since 1980, they saw 278 members elected, of which 210 were independents.

== Background ==
In January 1986, after the NRM ousted Tito Okello's military regime, the NRM established the National Resistance Council (NRC) as a transitional parliament. The new parliament comprised 38 members, most of whom were selected by the NRM. To improve the representation of women, youth and other special interest groups at the county and district levels in 1989, the NRC' membership was increased to 270.

Political parties were not allowed to participate in the elections, in line with the NRM's "no-party" philosophy, which argued that multiparty competition had previously contributed to sectarianism and conflict in Uganda.

== Electoral system ==
The expanded NRC included:

- 149 county representatives
- 19 municipal or city council representatives
- 34 district women representatives
- 20 presidential nominees
- Other members from special interest groups, the army, and the civil service

Voting was held in public queuing manner where voters formed lines behind their chosen candidate, while the candidates themselves stood facing away from the crowd. Only local residents could run for election, and individuals who had been agents of past intelligence agencies were not allowed to participate. There was no formal voter registration system, and the campaign process was brief, limited to short public introductions.

== Results ==
Of the 278 contested seats, the vast majority were won by independent candidates unaffiliated with a political party, reflecting the restrictions of the Movement system. Fourteen ministers and deputy ministers lost their seats. Only two women were elected in open competition against male candidates, though additional women entered parliament through reserved seats.

== Aftermath ==
While the elections were portrayed by the NRM as an important step towards inclusive governance, opposition figures from the Democratic Party and Uganda People's Congress criticised the process as undemocratic, citing the ban on party activity and the public voting method. The expanded NRC remained in place until the adoption of the 1995 constitution, which paved the way for a return to multiparty politics in the mid-2000s.
