= Apolo Nsibambi =

Prime Minister of Uganda from 1999–2011

Rt Hon Apolo Robin Nsibambi
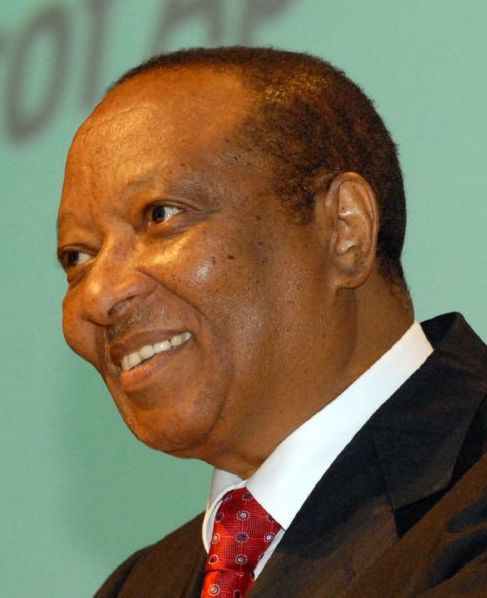
- Nsibambi in 2008

8th Prime Minister of Uganda
- In office 5 April 1999 – 24 May 2011
- President: Yoweri Museveni
- Preceded by: Kintu Musoke
- Succeeded by: Amama Mbabazi

Personal details
- Born: 25 October 1940 Uganda Protectorate
- Died: 28 May 2019 (aged 78) Bulange, Rubaga Division, Kampala, Uganda
- Party: National Resistance Movement
- Spouse(s): Rhoda Nsibambi (1968–2001); Esther Nsibambi (2003–2019)
- Education: Makerere University (B.S.); University of Chicago (M.A.); University of Nairobi (Ph.D.)

Apolo Robin Nsibambi (25 October 1940 – 28 May 2019) was a Ugandan academic and politician who served as the 8th Prime Minister of Uganda from 5 April 1999 until 24 May 2011, when Amama Mbabazi succeeded him.

A distinguished scholar of political science, he taught at Makerere University from the 1960s and later held several senior academic positions, including Dean of the Faculty of Social Sciences and Head of the Department of Political Science. He was also Director of the Makerere Institute of Social Research between 1994 and 1996. Beyond academia, Nsibambi served in government as Minister of Public Service (1996–1998) and Minister of Education and Sports (1998–1999) before his appointment as Prime Minister. From 2003 to 2007, he became the first non-Head-of-State Chancellor of Makerere University. Widely regarded as an intellectual statesman, Nsibambi was noted for bridging academia and politics, and during his tenure as Prime Minister he described Makerere as an "intellectual cradle" for fellow scholar Ali Mazrui. He is remembered for his contributions to public service and higher education in Uganda.

== Early life and education ==
Apolo Robin Nsibambi was born on 25 October 1940. He was one of 12 children born to Eva Bakaluba and Semyoni Nsibambi, a leader in the Balokole movement or the "East African Revival". Apolo Nsibambi attended King's College Budo for his high school education. He held a Bachelor of Science degree in economics, with honors, from the Makerere University. He also held a Master of Arts degree in political science from the University of Chicago in the United States. His Doctor of Philosophy degree was obtained from the University of Nairobi.

== Career ==
Nsibambi served as the dean of Faculty of Social Science at Makerere University from 1978 until 1983 and from 1985 until 1987. He was appointed head of the Department of Political Science at Makerere University in 1987, a position he held until 1990. He was Director of the Makerere Institute of Social Research from 1994 to 1996.

Between 1996 and 1998, he served as Minister of Public Service in the Uganda Cabinet. In 1998 he was appointed Minister of Education and Sports, serving in that capacity until 1999 when he was appointed Prime Minister and Leader of Government Business in Parliament.

Nsibambi also served as the chancellor of Makerere University from 2003 until October 2007. He taught at the university in the 1960s, befriending author Paul Theroux, who interviewed Nsibambi in his travelogue Dark Star Safari.

In 1999, Apollo Nsibambi delivered the keynote address at the Ugandan North American Association (UNAA) convention in Atlanta, Georgia.

== Personal life ==
He married Esther Nsibambi in March 2003 after the death of his first wife, Rhoda, in December 2001. He was the father of four daughters. He was a practising Anglican. Nsibambi died on 28 May 2019, at the age of 78.

== See also ==
- Politics of Uganda
- Cabinet of Uganda
- Parliament of Uganda

Political offices
Preceded by Kintu Musoke	Prime Minister of Uganda; 1999-2011	Succeeded by Amama Mbabazi
