= Balokole =

Balokole is an African evangelical Christian reform movement started by Simeon Nsibambi and John E. Church in the 1930s. Biblically a revival is initiated by YHWH. At Pentecost for instance, Apostle Peter is not the one who "started" the revival, but it was an act of YHWH. The Balokole arose within the East African Revival Movement which sought to renew the Protestant churches in Uganda, Kenya, Tanganyika, and Ruanda-Urundi. Despite its theological roots in the Western revival movement of the eighteenth and nineteenth centuries, the Balokole evolved as an indigenous African movement. The term Balokole can be translated as "the saved ones" or "the chosen".

The Balokole movement criticized established hierarchies within the Church of Uganda and questioned prevailing amorality or double standards. The Balokole formed egalitarian brotherhoods, followed puritanical rules, publicly confessed their sins and professed their experience of conversion, which they understood as a radical break with their former sinful selves and a receiving of new life from God. They stressed the importance of the Lordship of Christ over all areas of life. Dr Joe E. Church required those missionaries who did not agree with his revival theory to resign from their assigment. In 1949 at least eight missionaries were asked to resign due to disagreements with his leadership.

The Balokole in Uganda are not only of the East African Revival Movement but also the Pentecostal born again Christians who have their Sunday or daily prayers from Pentecostal churches which are headed by Pastors, who at times are called 'Bishops'. The born again Christians of the East Africa Revival Movement rooted from the early Church Of Uganda Protestants who were termed as 'sleepy' christians. The East African Revival Movement Born Again Christians are today referred to as the 'Abalokole Abazukuffu' meaning 'Awake Born Agains'. They still do carry on their regular services from the anglican church but do fellowship from designated areas where there is normally an elder in the faith.
