= George Cosmas Adyebo =

Prime Minister of Uganda from 1991–1994

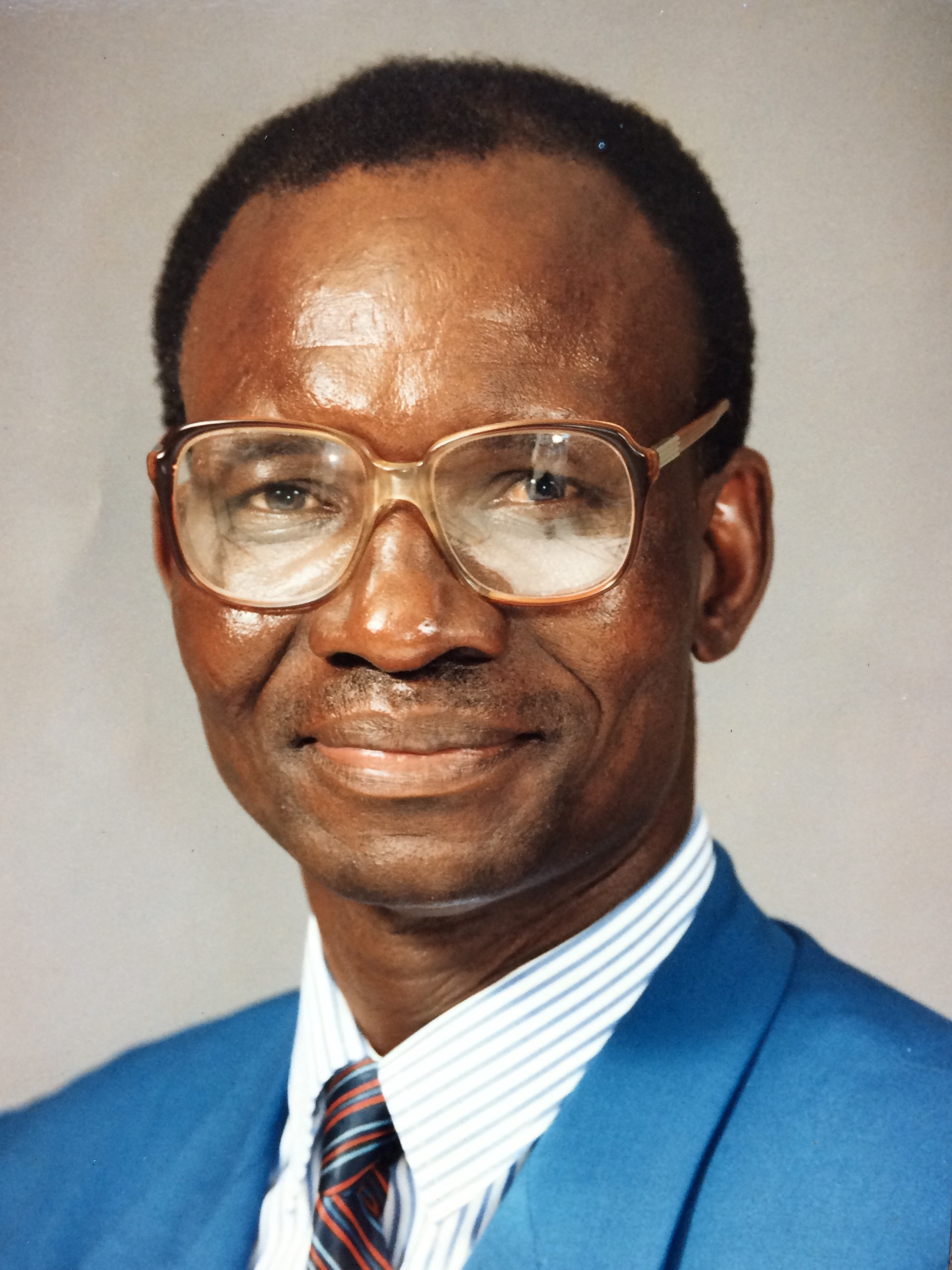

6th Prime Minister of Uganda
- In office 22 January 1991 – 18 November 1994
- Preceded by: Samson Kisekka
- Succeeded by: Kintu Musoke

Personal details
- Born: 18 June 1947 Owiny Parish, Nambyeso Sub County, Kwania District, Protectorate of Uganda
- Died: 19 November 2000 (aged 53) Kampala, Uganda
- Party: National Resistance Movement
- Profession: politician

George Cosmas Adyebo (18 June 1947 – 19 November 2000) was a Ugandan politician and economist who was Prime Minister of Uganda from 1991 to 1994.

Adyebo became prime minister on 22 January 1991, succeeding Samson Kisekka, who became vice-president. Adyebo served as prime minister for nearly four years, until 18 November 1994.

== Early life and education ==
Adyebo George Cosmas was born on 18 June 1947 at Owiny Village, Nambyeco sub-county, Kwania, Apac to Mr. William Ogwal and Imat Giradeci Acio.

Adyebo joined St. Aloysius College, Nyapea from the St Pious XII Junior Secondary School Aduku.

During his 'O' levels at St. Aloysius College Nyapea, he served as the school prefect.

After succeeding in his 'A' levels at Namilyango College, he was awarded a scholarship to study at Charles University in Prague. He graduated with a master's degree in Economic Engineering specializing in Mechanization & Automation of Management.

== Early career ==
From 1976 to 1979, Adyebo worked as a systems Analyst/Programmer with Uganda Computer Services, a department of the Ministry of Finance before he was promoted and retained by the Ministry of Education.

From 1979 to 1983, Adyebo lectured at the Makerere University Business School.

After serving as a lecturer at Makerere Business School, he became the principal of Uganda College of Commerce Aduku from 1983 to 1989 while simultaneously serving as a member of Apac District Council V.

Adyebo died on 19 November 2000 at Kampala International Hospital after battling with cancer for several years.

== Political career ==
Adyebo was a Member of Parliament for Kwania County at the time of his death. He served numerous political roles:

1997–2000: Member of Parliament for Kwania County

1994–1997: Deputy Speaker of Parliament and Senior Presidential Advisor. In 1995, Adyebo was an elected delegate during the debating and promulgation of the 1995 constitution.

1991–1994: Ugandan Prime Minister.

1989: Member of the National Resistance Movement prior to joining the Apac District Council V.

== Family ==
The Adyebo met his wife Nelly Adyebo during his educational occupation at UCC Aduku. They have four children; Moses Oteng, Carolyne Acio, Christine Ayo and Abraham Ogwal.

Political offices
Preceded by Samson Kisekka	Prime Minister of Uganda; 22 January 1991 - 18 November 1994	Succeeded by Kintu Musoke
