= Presidential Commission of Uganda =

Interim government of Uganda (1980)

Agency overview
- Formed: May 22, 1980
- Dissolved: December 15, 1980
- Jurisdiction: Uganda
- Headquarters: Kampala, Uganda
- Agency executive: Paulo Muwanga, Chairman
- Parent agency: Government of Uganda

The Presidential Commission of Uganda was a transitional governing body in Uganda that operated from May 22 to December 15, 1980, following the overthrow of President Godfrey Binaisa. Chaired by Paulo Muwanga, the commission served as the de facto executive authority as the office of President of Uganda during a turbulent period in Uganda’s history, bridging the gap between Binaisa’s presidency and the general election that restored Milton Obote to power. The commission was established to stabilize the country amid political instability and to oversee the controversial 1980 election, which sparked significant unrest.

== Early composition ==
the presidential commission of Uganda was established on 27th July 1985 following the military coup that overthrew the government of President Milton Obote. The commission was created by the Military administration headed by Tito Okello to serve as Uganda's collective head of state during transitional period.

the commission was chaired by Pawulo Muwanga. Its original members included Yoweri Hunter Wacha-Olwol, Justice saulo musoke, Lt. General Otema Allimadi, and John Babiiha. The membership reflected an effort by the military government to include individuals with legal, political, administrative, and military experience durung the period of political instability.

== Composition and Role ==
The Presidential Commission was a six-member body, with Paulo Muwanga as its chairman. Other members included key political and military figures. The commission’s primary role was to govern Uganda during the transitional period, managing state affairs and preparing for the December 1980 general election. As head of the commission, Muwanga wielded significant influence, overseeing both executive and electoral processes. The commission operated under the Uganda National Liberation Front (UNLF), a coalition formed to unify opposition groups after Amin’s fall.

It was composed as follows:

Leaders and member Interim Government of Presidential Commission of Uganda

#	Position	Name	Inaugurated	Left office
	National Resistance Army			
—		Godfrey Binaisa	5 May 1980	5 May 1980
1	Chairmen (rotating monthly)	Paulo Muwanga	5 May 1980	12 May 1980
2		Yoweri Museveni	May 1980	May 1980
3		Oyite-Ojok	May 1980	May 1980
4		Tito Okello	May 1980	May 1980
5		Zeddy Maruru	May 1980	May 1980
—		William Omaria	May 1980	22 May 1980
—		Steven Kashaka	22 May 1980	22 May 1980
6		Joram Mugume	22 May 1980	22 May 1980
—		Pecos Kuteesa	22 May 1980	22 May 1980
—		Smith Open Acak	22 May 1980	22 May 1980
	Presidential Commission of Uganda			
7		Saulo Musoke	22 May 1980	15 December 1980
8		Polycarp Nyamuchoncho	22 May 1980	15 December 1980
9		Yoweri Hunter Wacha-Olwol	22 May 1980	15 December 1980
	Presidential Commission of Uganda			
10		Milton Obote	15 December 1980	15 December 1980

== 1980 General Election ==
The commission’s most significant responsibility was overseeing the general election held on December 10, 1980. Muwanga, as head of the Electoral Commission, declared the Uganda People’s Congress (UPC), led by Milton Obote, the winner, securing Obote’s return to the presidency. However, the election was marred by allegations of fraud, including ballot stuffing and voter intimidation, leading to widespread controversy. Opposition groups, particularly Yoweri Museveni’s Uganda Patriotic Movement, rejected the results, claiming the commission manipulated the outcome to favor Obote. This dissatisfaction fueled the Ugandan Bush War, a guerrilla conflict led by Museveni that eventually toppled Obote’s government in 1986.

The commission dissolved on December 15, 1980, when Obote assumed the presidency.

== See also ==
- Uganda
- Uganda since 1979, part of the History of Uganda series.
- President of Uganda
- Politics of Uganda
- Political parties of Uganda

== Sources ==
Political offices
Preceded by Paulo Muwanga	President of Uganda; 22 May – 15 December 1980	Succeeded by Milton Obote
