= Kintu Musoke =

Prime Minister of Uganda from 1994–1999

7th Prime Minister of Uganda
- In office 18 November 1994 – 5 April 1999
- Preceded by: George Cosmas Adyebo
- Succeeded by: Apolo Nsibambi

Personal details
- Born: 8 May 1938 (age 88) Protectorate of Uganda
- Party: National Resistance Movement
- Education: Delhi University (BA)
- Profession: Politician

Kintu Musoke (born 8 May 1938) is a Ugandan politician, journalist, and activist who served as the 7th Prime Minister of Uganda from 18 November 1994 to 5 April 1999 under President Yoweri Museveni. A veteran of Uganda’s post-independence politics, he was closely associated with the Uganda People’s Congress (UPC) in the 1960s before joining the National Resistance Movement (NRM) in the 1980s. Musoke began his public life as a journalist and political mobiliser, co-founding the African Pilot newspaper and advocating for social justice, press freedom, and Pan-Africanism. He went into exile during Idi Amin’s regime and became part of the opposition that mobilised against the dictatorship. After 1986, he held several ministerial posts, including Minister of Information, before his elevation to Prime Minister.

In later years, he was appointed to head a task force on fighting AIDS in Uganda and served as an advisor to the President of Uganda.

== Background and education ==
Kintu Musoke was born on 8 May 1938 in Masaka District (present-day Kalungu District) to Yafeesi Kintu and Eseza Nassiwa. He was the sixth of 13 children in a peasant family. He studied at Kabungo Native Anglican Church School and Buwere Primary School before joining King’s College Budo for his secondary education. At Budo, he was drawn into student activism during the exile of Kabaka Mutesa in 1953.

In 1959, he won a scholarship to study in India, enrolling at Delhi University. There he pursued a Bachelor of Arts in Political Science, Philosophy, and Journalism. His time in India exposed him to Pan-Africanist thought and connected him with other African nationalists.

Career

Following his graduation from university in 1963, he returned to Uganda and entered politics as a UPC youth mobilizer. In 1965, he was expelled from the party together with the other members belonging to a faction led by the UPC's Secretary General John Kakonge. He then abstained from politics until 1980, when he participated in the formation of the Uganda Patriotic Movement, which eventually morphed into the National Resistance Movement. During his lifetime, he has worked with several newspapers, including Uganda Eyogera, Uganda Argus, The African Pilot and Weekly Topic.

== See also ==
- Jaberi Bidandi Ssali
- Kirunda Kivejinja
- Yoweri Museveni
- Cabinet of Uganda

Political offices
Preceded by George Cosmas Adyebo	Prime Minister of Uganda; 18 November 1994 – 5 April 1999	Succeeded by Apolo Nsibambi
