= Samson Kisekka =

Vice President of Uganda from 1991–1994

Samson Babi Mululu Kisekka

5th Prime Minister of Uganda
- In office 30 January 1986 – 22 January 1991
- Preceded by: Abraham Waligo
- Succeeded by: George Cosmas Adyebo

5th Vice President of Uganda
- In office 22 January 1991 – November 1994
- President: Yoweri Museveni
- Preceded by: Paulo Muwanga
- Succeeded by: Specioza Kazibwe

Personal details
- Born: 23 June 1912 Mengo, Kampala, Uganda Protectorate
- Died: 25 October 1999 (aged 87) London, United Kingdom
- Party: National Resistance Movement
- Profession: physician

Samson Babi Mululu Kisekka (23 June 1912 – 25 October 1999) was a Ugandan politician who was Prime Minister of Uganda from 1986 to 1991 and the fifth Vice President of Uganda from 1991 to 1994. He also worked as a medical doctor and diplomat. He was closely associated with Yoweri Museveni.

== Biography ==
Dr. Kisekka Samson was born in the evening of Friday 23 June 1912 in Mengo, Kampala, Uganda and grew up near what would become Uganda's capital, Kampala. The third child out of only five sons of his parents, belonging to the Lion clan of Buganda tribe. His father was Paul M. Babikulya, a Muluka Chief, and mother Yaeri N. Babikulya were strong believers of Anglican Church.

At only nine years, young Samson was taken to Kira and Ngogwe Central Schools away from his home in Nakifuma County. After five years, as a result of his impressive performance, was awarded a scholarship for a period of three years for secondary education tenable at King's College Buddo. After Buddo, he gained another scholarship, this time for six years to study medicine at the Makerere University Medical School and became a respected doctor. He was a First Class Scholar, Administrator, and an ardent sportsman as he was part of the "first eleven" team footballer (representing Uganda Vs Kenya) winning the Archer all round prize for the best all rounder at Makerere University in December 1935.

In January 1939 still a young man, he joined the Uganda Ministry of Health. Though this presented many challenges to him, him being a strong believer and a man of principles he sailed through with success and commitment. During his fourteen years stay in the Uganda Civil Service (from 1939 through 1953), he played a strategic role in fighting for recognition of African Physicians. He got deeply involved in medical programs that mainly benefited the general public, orphans and other disadvantaged groups.

Dr. Kisekka was very entrepreneurial in character, which came to light as far back as the 1940s. He got involved in many business ventures that included; a transportation company, a fishing company, a farming association, a dairy cooperative, an insurance company, and a transportation cooperative.

His political life begun when he was elected as a representative to the Buganda Lukiiko representing Sentema constituency in Busiro from 1959 to 1964. While in the Buganda parliament of Buganda, the King of Buganda Muteesa II appointed him to be Minister of Health and Works for the Buganda Government for the period 1964 to 1966.

During the period from 1981 to 1986 and the years before that were characterized by political turmoil and instability, he went into exile due to government reprisals and persecution because of his outspokenness against what he considered wrong. After becoming an ally of Yoweri Museveni, he served as an international spokesman for his rebel group, the National Resistance Movement. He was a spokesman of the National Resistance Movement (NRM) in September to December 1985 during the Nairobi Peace Talks between NRM and the Uganda Government headed by Tito Okello Lutwa.

Immediately after becoming president of Uganda Yoweri Museveni appointed Dr. Kisekka to be the Prime Minister of Uganda on 31 January 1986, in which position he served for five years. He was later elevated to the office of the Vice President on 22 January 1991. He also served as a special presidential adviser until his retirement in 1994.

In 1993, Samson Kisekka delivered the keynote address at the Ugandan North American Association (UNAA) convention in Cincinnati, Ohio.

Dr. Kisekka belonged to a new generation of African leadership which emerged with clarity of thought, honest evaluation of Africa's history, and a vision for a bright future for Africa. He supported a type of leadership which breaks down the political, economic, and social boundaries, and suggested a leadership culture oriented to economic development. He never reconciled with colonial educational policies but believed in a pattern of education tailored to the needs of the African society.

He considered himself under debt to the community whose tax payments had provided the scholarships for his studies at secondary school and university. He only wished he could repay the debt.

Dr. Kisekka was known as a hard-working statesman, an advocate of mixed farming, which activities covered horticulture and dairy farming. As a politician, he supported an end to ethnic tensions and a government without corruption.

Dr. Kisekka was a recipient of numerous awards and honors both on national and international level the most recognizable ones being listed in Men of Achievement-International Directory of International Biography, "International Who's Who of Intellectuals", the first Ugandan to ever be included, decorated with Paul Harris Fellowship-Rotary International. He considered unity of Uganda as the best mission for political leadership of the country.

Dr. Kisekka remained a presidential adviser until his death. He died at University College Hospital in London, England, of a heart attack on 25 October 1999, while awaiting heart surgery.

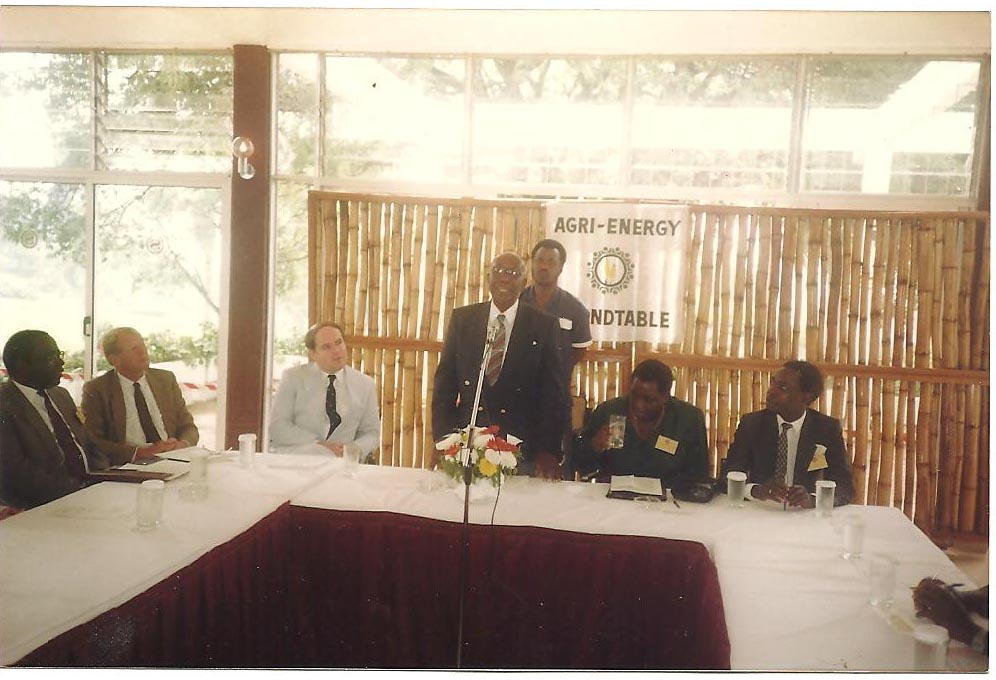
Uganda vice president Dr. Kisekka open AER/Uganda conference at Kampala Sheraton Hotel, November 25, 1991.

He was a member and an elder of the Seventh-day Adventist Church, and was Director of Uganda YMCA for a period of ten years from 1965 through 1975. He was a life member of the Uganda Bible Society, and a member of the International Religious Liberty Organization since 1987. He was married and had several children.

Political offices
Preceded by Abraham Waligo	Prime Minister of Uganda; 30 January 1986 - 22 January 1991	Succeeded by George Cosmas Adyebo
Preceded by Paulo Muwanga	Vice President of Uganda; 1991 - 1994	Succeeded by Specioza Kazibwe
