= Godfrey Binaisa =

Ugandan President from 1979 to 1980

5th President of Uganda
- In office 20 June 1979 – 12 May 1980
- Preceded by: Yusuf Lule (interim)
- Succeeded by: Paulo Muwanga

Personal details
- Born: Godfrey Lukongwa Binaisa; 30 May 1920 Kampala, Uganda
- Died: 5 August 2010 (aged 90) Kampala, Uganda
- Party: UNC (1952–1962); UPC (1962–1980); UPM (1980–1986); URM (1986–2010)
- Other political affiliations: UNLF (1979–1980)
- Spouse(s): Irene Marjorie Kabamori (?–2003); Tomoko Yamamoto (2004–2005)
- Education: King's College London
- Profession: Lawyer, Politician

Godfrey Lukongwa Binaisa QC (30 May 1920 – 5 August 2010) was a Ugandan lawyer and politician who served as the fifth president of Uganda from 20th June 1979 to 12th May 1980. He came to power following the overthrow of Idi Amin and the Uganda National Liberation Front (UNLF) transition period. Earlier, he was Attorney General of Uganda from 1962 to 1968. At the time of his death in 2010, he was Uganda's only surviving former president.

== Education and early career ==
Born in Kampala, Binaisa was initially a lawyer. He was educated at King's College Budo and Makerere College. He then earned an LLB from King's College London in 1955 and was called to the Bar at Lincoln's Inn in 1956. He was appointed a Queen's counsel (QC) and had a private law practice in Kampala.

Binaisa was a member of the political parties Uganda National Congress and United Congress Party during the 1950s. He later joined Uganda People's Congress which in 1962 formed the first post-independence government of Uganda. He was appointed the Attorney General in 1962 and served until 1968 when he resigned over disagreements with President Milton Obote concerning constitutional matters, particularly the presidential powers of detention.

In 1969 Binaisa went into private legal practice, and after Idi Amin took power in 1971, he went into exile first to the United Kingdom where in London he was employed by the London office of Graham & James LLP, an international maritime law firm. Following that he moved to the United States, where he served as a "paralegal" at the main office of Graham & James in San Francisco. After his presidency ended he returned to London for a time and then ultimately practised law in Mount Vernon, New York. While in the US, he became a member of Uganda Freedom Union, one of several anti-Amin groups in exile.

== Presidency ==
Following the overthrow of Idi Amin in 1979, Binaisa returned to Uganda. After Idi Amin, Yusuf Lule served as the interim president for 68 days. On 20 June 1979, Binaisa was appointed President of Uganda by the National Consultative Commission, which was then the supreme governing body of the Uganda National Liberation Front (UNLF), a coalition of former Ugandan exiles who had helped remove Idi Amin.

When Binaisa removed the army Chief of Staff, Brigadier Oyite Ojok, he was himself removed from office on 12 May 1980 by the Military Commission, a powerful organ of the UNLF headed by Paulo Muwanga, and whose deputy was Yoweri Museveni (then leader of Uganda Patriotic Movement and the current president of Uganda (1986-to date)). The country was then led by the Presidential Commission of Uganda (set up a few days after the coup) with, among others, Paulo Muwanga, Yoweri Museveni, Oyite Ojok and Tito Okello.

The Presidential Commission ruled Uganda until the December 1980 general elections. Binaisa had joined, and was made vice president of, the Uganda Patriotic Movement. The elections were won by Milton Obote's Uganda Peoples Congress, however, the results were disputed, leading Museveni to launch a guerrilla rebellion the Museveni bush war, which subsequently led him to gain the presidency in 1986.

The development of the "Movement" political system previously used by Museveni's government has often been attributed to Binaisa. Calling the ideology "Umbrella", Binaisa used the system to consolidate his position during his own presidency, seeking to unite all Ugandans in the same political fold.

Throughout the early 1980s and 1990s, Binaisa lived in New York practicing law and later returned to Uganda, where he led a quiet life in retirement. He was the only former president of Uganda being looked after by the state under provisions of the Constitution of Uganda.

== Wedding ==
Binaisa married Tomoko Yamamoto on 26 July 2004 in a Unification Church Blessing Ceremony. They met through the internet. The marriage ended in July 2005.

== Death ==
Binaisa died in his sleep on 5 August 2010. He was 90 years old and had suffered a stroke or heart attack earlier in the year. Someone tried to rouse him for a morning shower but he had died in the night. Binaisa was granted a state funeral.

== See also ==
- Ugandan Americans
- Ugandan diaspora

Political offices
| Preceded by Yusufu Lule | President of Uganda; June 1979 – May 1980 | Succeeded by Paulo Muwanga |
