= Bazilio Olara-Okello =

Ugandan President

Lieutenant general Bazilio Olara-Okello

Interim President of Uganda
- De facto
- In office 27 July 1985 – 29 July 1985
- Vice President: Vacant
- Preceded by: Milton Obote
- Succeeded by: Tito Okello

Personal details
- Born: Bazilio Olara-Okello; 1929
- Died: 9 January 1990 (aged 60–61) Khartoum, Sudan

Military service
- Allegiance: British Empire; Uganda
- Branch/service: British Army; Uganda Army; Uganda National Liberation Army (UNLA)
- Years of service: 1950–1962 (British Empire); 1962–1971 (Uganda Army); 1979–1986 (UNLA)
- Rank: Lieutenant general
- Unit: Uganda Army; Uganda National Liberation Army
- Battles/wars: Mau Mau uprising 1972 invasion of Uganda; Uganda–Tanzania War; Ugandan Bush War

Bazilio Olara-Okello (1929 – 9 January 1990) was a Ugandan military officer and one of the commanders of the Uganda National Liberation Army (UNLA) that together with the Tanzanian army organized the coup d'état that overthrew Idi Amin in 1979. In 1985, he was briefly the chairman of the ruling Military Council and de facto head of state of Uganda, and later, lieutenant-general and chief of the armed forces.

During the civil war in Uganda between the UNLA (which was now the national army) and Yoweri Museveni's National Resistance Army, president Milton Obote alienated much of the Acholi-dominated officer corps, including Olara-Okello and General Tito Okello, by appointing his fellow ethnic Lango, Brigadier Smith Opon Acak, as army Chief of Staff. On 27 July 1985, an army brigade of the UNLA commanded by Olara-Okello, and composed mostly of Acholi troops, staged a coup d'état against Milton Obote's government and seized power. The National Assembly was dissolved and a Military Council was established. Between 27 and 29 July 1985, Olara-Okello was Chairman of the Military Council, and de facto head of state.

On 29 July, General Tito Okello replaced Olara-Okello as Chairman of the Military Council, and Olara-Okello was promoted from the rank of Brigadier to that of Lieutenant General, and named chief of the armed forces. He commanded the army until Yoweri Museveni's National Resistance Army seized power on 26 January 1986. Olara-Okello fled to exile in Sudan, where he lived until he died in Omdurman Hospital in Khartoum on 9 January 1990.

== See also ==
- Uganda since 1979, part of the History of Uganda series.
- Nairobi Agreement, 1985
- Politics of Uganda
- Political parties of Uganda

Political offices
Preceded by Milton Obote; As President of Uganda	Chairman of the Military Council de facto head of state 27–29 July 1985	Succeeded by Tito Okello
