= Vice President of Uganda =

Overview of the office of the Vice president in the African country of Uganda

The vice president of Uganda is the second-highest executive official in the Ugandan government. The vice president is appointed by the president.

== Vice presidents of Uganda ==
Name	Inaugurated	Left office	President	Notes
William Wilberforce Kadhumbula Nadiope III	October 1963	April 1966	Edward Mutesa	Deposed during the Mengo Crisis
John Babiiha	April 1966	January 1971	Milton Obote	Deposed in the 1971 coup d'état
Vacant	January 1971	January 1977		
Mustafa Adrisi	January 1977	Disputed; de facto April 1978	Idi Amin	Adrisi was factually disempowered by President Idi Amin in April 1978, but refused to accept his dismissal as Vice President. He remained in Uganda until mid-1979, maintaining a low profile but still claiming to be Vice President. When Amin was overthrown in the Uganda–Tanzania War, Adrisi fled into exile where he continued to pose as Vice President.
Disputed; claimed by Mustafa Adrisi	November 1978	December 1980		
Paulo Muwanga	December 1980	July 1985	Milton Obote	Deposed in the 1985 coup d'état
Vacant	July 1985	January 22, 1991		
Samson Kisekka	January 22, 1991	November 1994	Yoweri Museveni	
Specioza Kazibwe	November 18, 1994	May 21, 2003	Yoweri Museveni	The first woman in Africa to hold the position of vice-president of a sovereign nation.
Gilbert Bukenya	May 23, 2003	May 23, 2011	Yoweri Museveni	
Edward Ssekandi	May 24, 2011	June 21, 2021	Yoweri Museveni	
Jessica Alupo	June 21, 2021	Incumbent	Yoweri Museveni	The second female Vice President of Uganda.

== See also ==
- President of Uganda
- Prime Minister of Uganda
