= Amama Mbabazi =

Former Prime Minister of Uganda from 2011 to 2014

The Right Honourable Amama Mbabazi
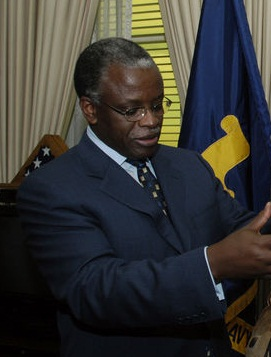

9th Prime Minister of Uganda
- In office 24 May 2011 – 18 September 2014
- President: Yoweri Museveni
- Deputy: Eriya Kategaya
- Preceded by: Apolo Nsibambi
- Succeeded by: Ruhakana Rugunda

Minister for Security
- In office 24 February 2009 – 24 May 2011
- Prime Minister: Apolo Nsibambi
- Preceded by: Kabakumba Masiko
- Succeeded by: Wilson Muruuli Mukasa

Attorney General of Uganda
- In office 1 May 2004 – 9 March 2006
- Prime Minister: Apolo Nsibambi
- Preceded by: Francis Ayume
- Succeeded by: Kiddu Makubuya

Member of Parliament from Kanungu District
- In office 11 February 2003 – 18 February 2016
- Preceded by: Constituency established
- Succeeded by: James Ruugi Kaberuka Niringiyimana

Personal details
- Born: Patrick Amama Mbabazi; 16 January 1949 (age 77) Mparo, Rukiga County, Uganda Protectorate
- Party: National Resistance Movement
- Education: Makerere University (Bachelor of Laws); Law Development Centre (Diploma in Legal Practice)

John Patrick Amama Mbabazi, SC (simply known as Amama Mbabazi, born 16 January 1949) is a Ugandan politician who served as the ninth Prime Minister of Uganda from 24th May, 2011 to 19th September, 2014. He played an instrumental role in Uganda's protracted liberation struggle from several tyrannical governments (1972-1986) and is a founding member of the National Resistance Movement, the ruling political party in Uganda.

Mbabazi served as the member of parliament for the Kinkiizi West constituency in Kanungu District, a position held from 1996 until 2016, when he ran unsuccessfully for the Presidency.

== Early life and education ==
Amama Mbabazi was born in Mparo Village, Rukiga County, in present-day Rukiga District, on 16th January, 1949. He attended two of the most prominent educational institutions in Uganda during both the colonial and post-colonial periods: Kigezi College Butobere for his high school education, and Ntare School for his A-Level. Mbabazi earned a Bachelor of Laws from Makerere University. He received a postgraduate Diploma in Legal Practice from the Law Development Center in Kampala. He is an Advocate of the Courts of Judicature of Uganda and has been a member of the Uganda Law Society since 1977.

== Career ==
Before entering politics, he worked as a state attorney in the Attorney General's Chambers from 1976 to 1978, rising to the position of secretary of the Uganda Law Council from 1977 to 1979.

Between 1986 and 1992, he served as head of the External Security Organisation.

He has also served as Minister of State in the President's Office, in charge of political affairs.

He became secretary of the NRM caucus in the Constituent Assembly that drafted the 1995 Uganda Constitution.

Between 1986 and 1992, he was Minister of State for Defence. Subsequently, he served as Minister of State for Regional Cooperation from 1998 to 2001. He was Attorney General and Minister of Justice from 2004 to 2006, a feat that earned him the moniker "Super Minister". He was appointed Minister of Defence in 2006, a position he held until he was appointed Minister of Security. He served as Minister of Security from February 2009 until May 2011, when he was appointed prime minister.

He was Secretary General of the NRM from November 2005 to January 2015.

=== Presidential bid ===
In late August 2014, Mbabazi addressed the Ugandan North American Association (UNAA) convention in San Diego, California. Less than three weeks later, on 19 September 2014, President Yoweri Museveni replaced Mbabazi as prime minister with Ruhakana Rugunda. Deutsche Welle and other media reported that the reshuffle was widely seen in the context of internal ruling-party tensions and speculation about Mbabazi’s political ambitions.

On 15 June 2015, Mbabazi declared his intentions to run against Yoweri Museveni for the National Resistance Movement's nomination for president at the party's convention on 4 October 2015. This declaration was followed by a response from President Museveni who dubbed it "bad conduct and premature". On 31 July, after much disagreement between top-ranking party officials and Mbabazi himself, the former prime minister declared he would stand as an independent candidate. His candidature was backed by The Democratic Alliance (TDA), a loose convergence of minor political parties working to win the position of presidency.

In the 2016 general election he received 1.39% of the vote, placing third.

== Diplomacy ==
Mbabazi has represented Uganda in international fora, including the United Nations Security Council, where he argued for the international community to allow the Uganda People's Defense Force to pursue the Lord's Resistance Army fighters into the Democratic Republic of the Congo.

Political offices
Preceded by Francis Ayume	Attorney General of Uganda; 2004–2006	Succeeded by Kiddu Makubuya
Preceded by Yoweri Museveni	Minister of Defence; 2006–2009	Succeeded by Crispus Kiyonga
Preceded by Wilson Muruuli Mukasa	Minister for Security; 2009–2011	Succeeded by Wilson Muruuli Mukasa
Preceded by Apolo Nsibambi	Prime Minister of Uganda; 2011–2014	Succeeded by Ruhakana Rugunda
