= Yusuf Lule =

Fourth president of Uganda (1912–1985)

4th President of Uganda
- In office 13 April 1979 – 20 June 1979
- Preceded by: Idi Amin
- Succeeded by: Godfrey Binaisa

Personal details
- Born: Yusuf Kironde Lule; 10 April 1912 Kampala, Uganda Protectorate
- Died: 21 January 1985 (aged 72) London, United Kingdom
- Party: Democratic Party
- Other political affiliations: National Resistance Movement
- Spouse: Hannah Lule (1924-2011)

Yusuf Kironde Lule (10 April 1912 – 21 January 1985) was a Ugandan professor and politician who served as the fourth president of Uganda between 13 April and 20 June 1979, following the overthrow of Idi Amin during the Uganda-Tanzania War. He was also the first black Principal of Makerere University.

== Early life and career ==
Yusuf Lule was born on 10 April 1912 in Kampala. He was educated at King's College Budo (1929–34), Makerere University College, Kampala (1934–36), Fort Hare University at Alice, South Africa (1936–39) and the University of Edinburgh. Initially, he was a Muslim but converted to Christianity while at King's College Budo.

In 1947, Lule married Hannah Namuli Wamala at Kings College Budo's church, where he was a teacher and she was head girl.

In 1959, the Democratic Party (DP) nominated Lule as a candidate to become Kattikiro (Prime Minister) of the subnational kingdom of Buganda. Many aristocratic figures in the kingdom distrusted or otherwise did not support Lule because of his Muslim origins despite his conversion to Christianity, and Michael Kintu ultimately won the election. Upon Uganda's independence in 1962, he became chairman of the Public Service Commission.

Lule served as the first black principal of Makerere University College from 1964 to 1970, and was assistant secretary-general of the Association of African Universities, in Accra, Ghana, between 1973 and 1978. Lule served as a minister in the pre-independence British colonial government and later as an assistant secretary-general of the Commonwealth Secretariat. He went into exile after Idi Amin came to power.

== Chairman of the Uganda National Liberation Front ==
Following the outbreak of the Uganda–Tanzania War, Ugandan rebels and exiles began making preparations for the establishment of a new government to follow Idi Amin's regime. After the Tanzania People's Defence Force (TPDF) had captured substantial territory, President Julius Nyerere of Tanzania ordered it to halt to give time for the Ugandan rebels to convene and reorganise. The Ugandan rebels made due preparations, primarily led by former president Milton Obote and leftist intellectual Dani Wadada Nabudere in their own respective circles. As the Tanzanians began organising a conference for the rebels and exiles, Nyerere was reconsidering Obote's role in the movement. He did not want to give the impression that Tanzania was going to install a government of its own choice in Uganda by facilitating Obote's assumption of leadership of the rebel movement, and there was hostility to Obote from the Baganda people in southern Uganda as well as other countries such as Kenya. Nyerere also feared that Obote would stifle cooperation at the meeting and cause it to break up without success. He ultimately convinced Obote to refrain from attending. In place of Obote, many Ugandan exiles began favouring Lule, who was a Muganda and had the reputation of being a political moderate as well as a civil servant who was not tarnished by scandal or corrupt service in a past Ugandan regime.

The Moshi Conference opened on 24 March 1979 in the Tanzanian town of Moshi, following an intense debate over which factions and persons could be admitted. That afternoon the delegates announced the formation of the Uganda National Liberation Front (UNLF), which was to be governed by a 30-strong National Consultative Committee (NCC) and an 11-strong National Executive Committee, the latter including three special commissions—Finance and Administration, Political and Diplomatic Affairs, and Military Affairs. The next two days were spent debating the balance of power among the governing bodies and the selection of a chairman for the organisation, which was hotly contested between Lule and Paulo Muwanga, an Obote supporter. After heated argument a consensus was reached whereby Lule would be given the chair and Muwanga would be made head of the Military Affairs Commission.

== President of Uganda ==
=== Inauguration ===
Caught unprepared by the fall of Kampala, Lule hurriedly compiled a list of ministers meant to represent the ethnic balances of Uganda's population. On 12 April 1979 Lule and his cabinet boarded a flight from Dar es Salaam to Entebbe to fly in for his inauguration. While the plane was stopped in Mwanza, Tanzanian officials decided to delay it there until they could ensure better security for a ceremony in Kampala. The next day Lule and his ministers reached Entebbe and were brought into Kampala in a TPDF motorcade in the late afternoon. Lule was then sworn in as President of Uganda in front of the Parliament building and gave a brief speech pledging to bring a return of law and order. Lule concluded by saying in Luganda, "Now it is our turn." Still feeling that Kampala was unsafe, Tanzanian officials quickly took Lule from Parliament and installed him in the Entebbe State House.

=== Tenure ===
Lule assumed office at a time when Uganda's national institutions were dysfunctional and the country was plagued by lawlessness and violence; he presided over a failed state. Lule disregarded the Moshi Conference agreements stipulating a weak presidential authority and attempted to assert his ability to operate under stronger powers provided by the constitution operative in Uganda before Amin's coup. Within days of assuming office Lule and his advisers began taking major decisions without consulting the NCC. He also snubbed the committee members by first missing their formal inauguration and, when the ceremony was rescheduled so he could be present, he gave a speech and departed before swearing them in, much to their displeasure. Lule then appointed ministers and deputy ministers to his cabinet without the NCC's approval. The members of the cabinet joined the NCC ex officio, and he ultimately appointed 24 ministers and 20 deputies, which then outnumbered the original councilors. Despite complaints from the NCC, Lule carried on making appointments and revising the structure of his cabinet. He also declared a reorganization of Ugandan's administration, dividing the country into four regions each subject to the authority of a regional commissioner.

Lule further infuriated the NCC when his cabinet awarded its own members $5,000 worth of foreign exchange as a "rehabilitation allowance" despite the treasury having very little money. Lule responded to the councilors' anger by offering them the same allowance, which they rejected. He also mistrusted the UNLA, which he considered to be made up of loyal Obote and Yoweri Museveni partisans. Lule's government withheld money to the army for this reason, and it played no role in overseeing the defeat of the remnants of Amin's forces. He planned on disbanding the UNLA and replacing it with a new "National Army", which angered the leaders of the former. The army was to be proportionately representative of all of Uganda's regions and stipulate education requirements for applicants.

Lule secured a £100 million aid programme from Western countries, alienating leftists who feared he would sell the country to international business interests. His government's efforts to stifle inflation and curb the black market were minimal and unsuccessful, and during his tenure the economic situation of Uganda continued its decline from Amin's rule.

Many Baganda were elated by Lule's elevation to the presidency, hoping that he would preserve the Buganda region's interests and keep Obote from returning to power. Lule ultimately did take measures that pleased the Baganda, such as restoring administrative unity to Buganda, conferring more powers upon Buganda's government, frequently delivering public statements in Luganda, appointing prominent Baganda monarchists to high office, and granting some state contracts to Baganda businessmen. In redistributing properties and enterprises seized from Amin's associates, Lule's government allocated a disproportionate amount to Baganda and his close associates. Members of other ethnic groups in Uganda did not trust Lule or accord him much respect, since they felt he would promote Buganda at other regions' expense. Some Ugandans feared that his army plan would lead to the creation of a force dominated by Baganda, since Buganda had a larger population than any other region in the country. His critics denounced him as a "monarchist" and a "feudalist".

=== Demise and removal from office ===
Lule's handling of his cabinet provoked outrage in the NCC, especially when he dismissed Muwanga from office. President Nyerere of Tanzania informed Lule that Tanzania would uphold the agreements regarding powers among Ugandan authorities made at Moshi. Lule felt that Tanzania afforded key support to his political opponents, and thus sought to reduce its influence in the country by deprecating the standing of the TPDF, which remained after the elimination of Amin's forces to provide order. He encouraged Ugandan publications to criticise the Tanzanian army, angering some Ugandan circles and the UNLA which thought it was unfair to attack the army which had "liberated" the country. On 8 June disgruntled members of the NCC convened in Kampala and passed a resolution demanding Lule present all of his political appointments to the committee for review. Lule did not respond, so on 12 June the NCC reconvened and declared that he had seven days to comply with their demands. The President once again failed to reply, so on the afternoon of 19 June the NCC met at the Entebbe State House in Lule's presence. NCC Chairman Edward Rugumayo opened the meeting by reviewing the body's unsuccessful entreaties to the President to submit his appointments for its ratification. Lule responded by stating that he was not prepared to take a stance involving such "important constitutional matters" by agreeing to submit the appointments to the NCC. He also said that his cabinet appointments were publicly known and that the committee could "treat the appointments as you wish".

Lule's statement was followed by hours of debate by the NCC concerning the division of powers agreed upon in Moshi. Later, Lule rose to say that he had not contravened the agreements made in Moshi and said that he had not received key directives supposedly dispatched to him from the NCC. Rugumayo retorted that the communications in question had been personally given to the President's secretary. Shortly after the exchange councilor Paulo Wangoola rose and delivered a long speech. He declared that Lule was not willing to accept the supremacy of UNLF governance and concluded by formally tabling a motion of no confidence in the President. This was followed by an intense debate in which different councilors gave impassioned defences and criticisms of Lule. At 1:00 on 20 June the NCC voted on the motion via secret ballot. The results were announced 35 minutes later with 18 councilors voting in favour and 14 against. Lule was thus removed from the presidency, and he walked out of the room with nine other councilors when Rugumayo said that his dismissal also triggered the removal of his cabinet.

Lule held the Ugandan Presidency for just 68 days, the shortest tenure of any President of Uganda. Godfrey Binaisa, the former Attorney General of Uganda under Obote who had come to oppose both him and Amin and had no prior role in the committee, was then elected president. Binaisa retained some of Lule's ministers but removed his key supporters from the cabinet and reversed his administrative changes in Buganda.

Many Baganda felt that Lule had been removed from power because he had preserved legitimate interests of Buganda. His ouster instigated large protests in Kampala and clashes between demonstrators and Tanzanian troops attempting to maintain order. Baganda protesters blocked streets and destroyed trucks while transportation workers went on strike and merchants deliberately gouged prices of basic commodities. Some armed Baganda groups formed after Lule's departure and attacked police and soldiers, rendering Buganda ungovernable. On 21 October 1980 the Ugandan Court of Appeal ruled that Lule's removal had been unlawful, stating that Lule had the authority to appoint ministers without the NCC's approval. Though the ruling technically meant Lule could still claim to be President of Uganda, most nationals chose to ignore the decision, since the political situation in the country had rapidly developed since Lule's removal.

== Later life ==
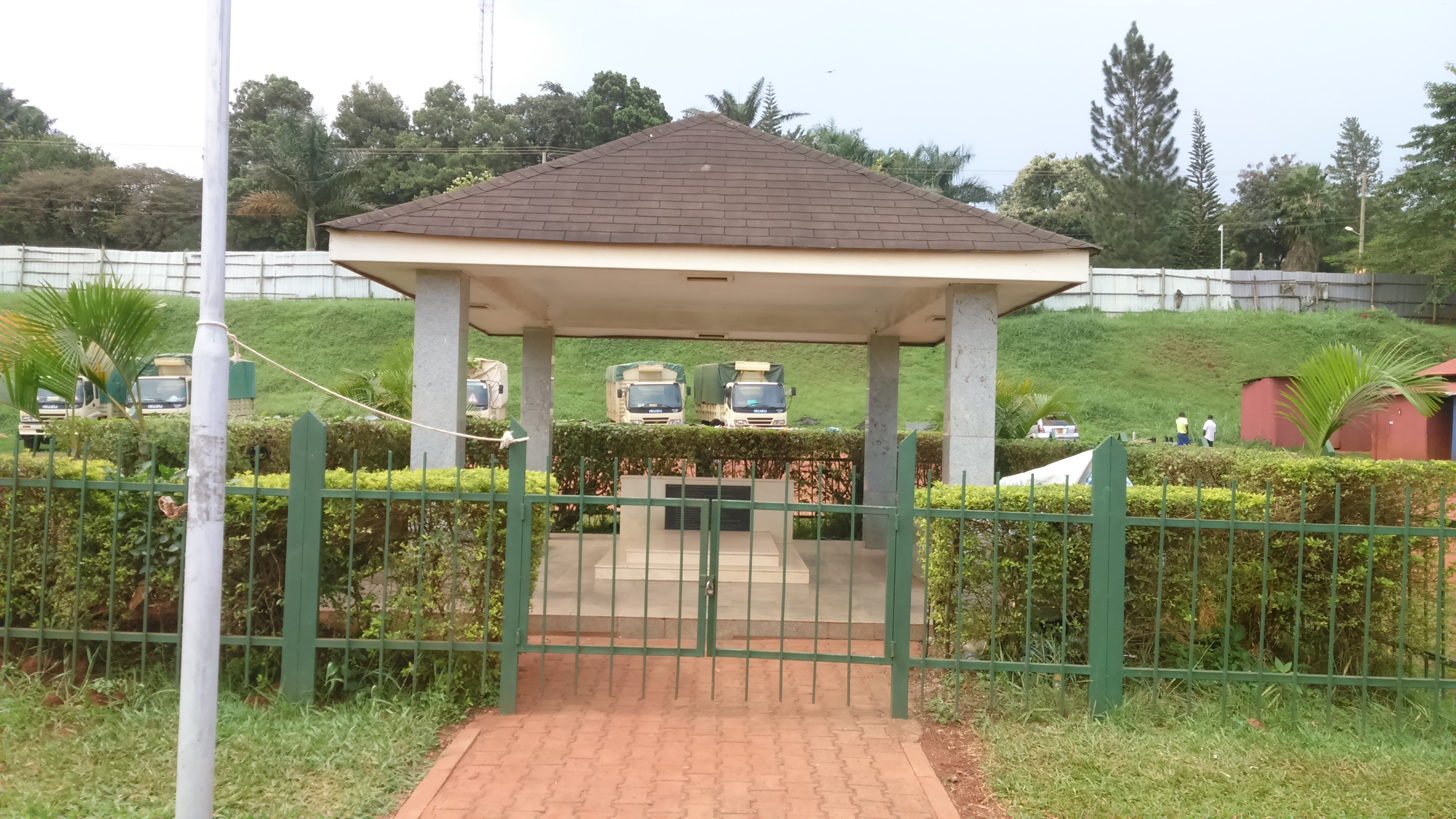
Kololo Hero Monument-Late Professor Yusuf Kironde Lule Monument

Out of office, Lule was flown to Tanzania, where he was detained under armed guard before being allowed to fly to London. He later went to Nairobi, Kenya. In 1980 Uganda hosted general elections to elect a new government. In anticipation of the contest, many Baganda began to support the DP as a way of opposing Obote and the UPC. Lule planned to attend the DP's conference in June where the party would select its new leaders. The incumbent leadership feared that his Baganda support would propel him to the helm of their organization and displace them, and thus they blocked his return to Uganda. Despite concerns of fraud and irregularities, the UPC was declared the ultimate winner of the elections and Obote became the President of Uganda. Fearful of Obote's grip on power, Lule along with others like Bernard Kibuuka Musoke founded and became head of a rebel group, the Uganda Freedom Fighters (UFF). On 8 June 1981 the UFF merged with Museveni's Popular Resistance Army to form the National Resistance Movement (NRM). Lule became chairman of the NRM, while Museveni became its vice-chairman and chairman of the High Command of the National Resistance Army, the group's armed wing. The merger greatly strengthened the support of the anti-Obote rebels in Buganda. Lule became a leading critic of Obote and authored a book, Human Rights Violations in Uganda under Obote, which was heavily circulated by non-governmental organizations.

Over the last six years of his life Lule received treatment for a kidney disorder at Hammersmith Hospital in London. He died there on 21 January 1985 of kidney failure following surgery. He was buried in London. The NRM released a statement upon his death, stating that it "wishes to assure its members, supporters, sympathizers and all Ugandans that the struggle for which Professor Lule stood will continue." The NRM ultimately won the Ugandan Bush War, capturing Kampala in January 1986. Following Museveni's seizure of power, his government requested that Lule's body be repatriated. The remains were disinterred and flown to Entebbe on 22 January 1987. Greeted at the airport by large crowds, Lule's body was taken to Kampala where it lay in state for two days before being reburied in Kampala where Uganda's first national flag had been raised on its independence day.

== Legacy ==
Historian Phares Mukasa Mutibwa described Lule's performance in the presidency as "amateurish".

His son, Wasswa Lule, became an MP for Rubaga North.

== See also ==
- Milton Obotte
- Iddi Amin Dada
- Godfrey Binaisa
- Yoweri Kagutta Museveni

== Works cited ==
- Amara, Odongo ori (1998). Museveni's Long March from Guerrilla to Statesman. Kampala: Fountain Publishers. ISBN 9789970021352.
- Avirgan, Tony; Honey, Martha (1983). War in Uganda: The Legacy of Idi Amin. Dar es Salaam: Tanzania Publishing House. ISBN 978-9976-1-0056-3.
- Ingham, Kenneth (1994). Obote: A political biography. New York & London: Routledge. ISBN 978-0-415-05342-6.
- Kasfir, Nelson (June 2005). "Guerrillas and civilian participation: the National Resistance Army in Uganda, 1981–86". The Journal of Modern African Studies. 43 (2): 271–296. doi:10.1017/S0022278X05000832.
- Kasozi, A. (1994). Social Origins of Violence in Uganda, 1964-1985. McGill-Queen's Press. ISBN 9780773564879.
- Mutibwa, Phares Mukasa (1992). Uganda Since Independence: A Story of Unfulfilled Hopes. Africa World Press. ISBN 9780865433571.
- Otunnu, Ogenga (2017). Crisis of Legitimacy and Political Violence in Uganda, 1979 to 2016. Chicago: Palgrave Macmillan. ISBN 978-3-319-33155-3.
- Tindigarukayo, Jimmy K. (1988). "Uganda, 1979-85: Leadership in Transition". The Journal of Modern African Studies. 27 (4): 607–622. doi:10.1017/S0022278X00015408. JSTOR 161322. S2CID 155043183.

Political offices
Preceded by Julius Nyerere	President of Uganda; 13 April – 20 June 1979	Succeeded by Godfrey Binaisa
