= Milton Obote =

Ugandan politician (1925–2005)

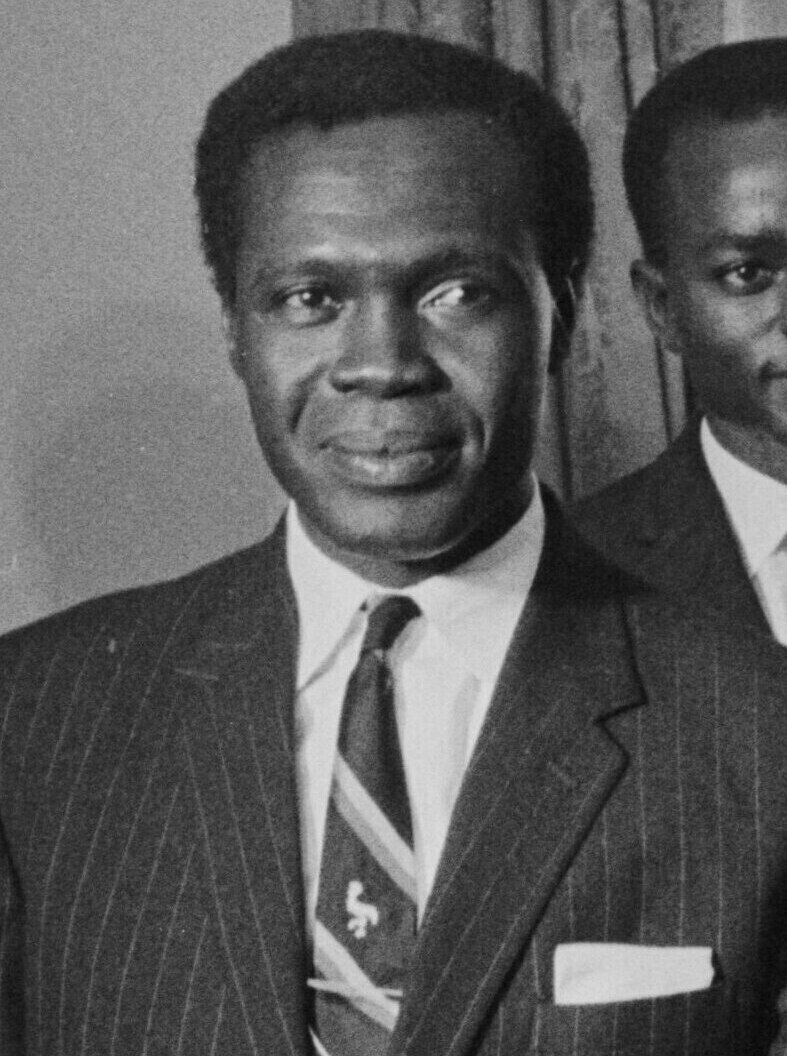
- Obote in 1962

2nd & 7th President of Uganda
- In office 17 December 1980 – 27 July 1985
- Vice President: Paulo Muwanga
- Preceded by: Presidential Commission
- Succeeded by: Bazilio Olara-Okello
- In office 4 March 1966 – 25 January 1971
- Vice President: John Babiiha
- Preceded by: Edward Mutesa (non-executive)
- Succeeded by: Idi Amin

Prime Minister of Uganda
- In office 30 April 1962 – 15 April 1966
- Monarchs: Elizabeth II (until 1963); Edward Mutesa II
- Preceded by: Benedicto Kiwanuka (non-executive)
- Succeeded by: Position abolished Otema Allimadi (1980)

Personal details
- Born: Apollo Milton Obote; 28 December 1925 Akokoro, Apac District, Uganda
- Died: 10 October 2005 (aged 79) Johannesburg, South Africa
- Party: Uganda People's Congress
- Spouse: Miria Obote
- Children: 5

Apollo Milton Obote (28 December 1925 – 10 October 2005) was a Ugandan politician who served as the Prime Minister of Uganda from 1962 to 1966 and the president of Uganda from 1966 to 1971 and later from 1980 to 1985.

A Lango, Obote studied at the Busoga College and Makerere University. In 1956, he joined the Uganda National Congress (UNC) and later split away by founding the Uganda People's Congress (UPC) in 1960. After Uganda gained independence from British colonial rule in 1962, Obote was sworn in as prime minister in a coalition with the Kabaka Yekka, whose leader Mutesa II was named president. Due to a rift with Mutesa over the 1964 Ugandan lost counties referendum and later getting implicated in a gold smuggling scandal, Obote overthrew him in 1966 and declared himself president, establishing a dictatorial regime with the UPC as the sole official party in 1969. As president, Obote implemented ostensibly socialist policies, under which the country suffered from severe corruption and food shortages.

He was overthrown in a military coup d'état by Idi Amin in 1971, settling in exile in Tanzania, but was re-elected in an election reported to be neither free nor fair in 1980, a year after Amin's 1979 overthrow. His second period of rule ended after a long and bloody conflict known as the Ugandan Bush War during which he was overthrown a second time by another coup d'état in 1985 led by Tito Okello, prompting him to live the rest of his life in exile.

== Early life ==
Apollo Milton Obote was born in the Akokoro village in the Apac district in northern Uganda, on 28 December 1925. He was the third born of nine children of a tribal chief of the Oyima clan Lango ethnic group. He began his education in 1940 at the Protestant Missionary School in Lira, and later attended Gulu Junior Secondary School, Busoga College, Mwiri and eventually university at Makerere University. Having intended to study law, a subject not taught at the university, Obote took a general arts course, including English and geography. At Makerere, Obote honed his natural oratorical skills; he may have been expelled for participating in a student strike, or alternatively left after a place to study law abroad was not funded by the protectorate government. He worked in Buganda in southern Uganda before moving to Kenya, where he worked as a construction worker at an engineering firm.

While in Kenya, Obote became involved in the national independence movement. Upon returning to Uganda in 1956, he joined the political party Uganda National Congress (UNC), and was elected to the colonial legislative council in 1957. In 1959, the UNC split into two factions, with one faction under the leadership of Obote merging with the Uganda People's Union to form the Uganda People's Congress (UPC).

Obote represented the UPC at the Ugandan Constitutional Conference, held at Lancaster House in 1961, alongside fellow Ugandan politician A. G. Mehta. The Conference was organised by the British Government to pave the way for Ugandan independence.

== Prime minister ==
In the runup to independence elections, Obote formed a coalition with the Buganda royalist party, Kabaka Yekka. The two parties controlled a Parliamentary majority and Obote became prime minister in 1962. He assumed the post on 25 April 1962, appointed by Sir Walter Coutts, then Governor-General of Uganda. The following year the position of governor-general was replaced by a ceremonial presidency to be elected by the parliament. Mutesa, the Kabaka (King) of Buganda, became the ceremonial president, with Obote as executive prime minister.

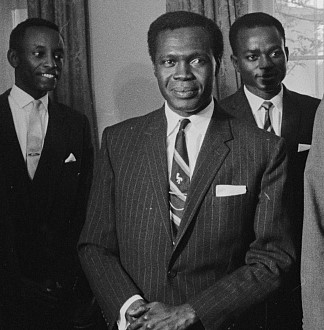
From left to right: Grace Ibingira, Obote, and John Kakonge in 1962

In January 1964, a mutiny occurred at the military barracks at Jinja, Uganda's second city and home to the 1st Battalion of the Uganda Army. There were similar mutinies in two other eastern African states; all three countries requested the support of troops from the British military. Before they arrived, however, Obote sent his defence minister Felix Onama to negotiate with the mutineers. Onama was held hostage, and agreed to many demands, including significant pay increases for the army, and the rapid promotion of many officers, including the future president Idi Amin. Later that year he participated in the 2nd Summit of the Non-Aligned Movement in Cairo. In 1965, Kenyans had been barred from leadership positions within the government, and this was followed by the removal of Kenyans en masse from Uganda in 1969, under Obote's guidance.

As prime minister, Obote was implicated in a gold smuggling plot, together with Idi Amin, then deputy commander of the Ugandan armed forces. When the Parliament demanded an investigation of Obote and the ousting of Amin, he suspended the constitution and declared himself President in March 1966, allocating to himself almost unlimited power under state of emergency rulings. Several members of his cabinet, who were leaders of rival factions in the party, were arrested and detained without charge. Obote responded with an armed attack upon Mutesa's palace, which ended with Mutesa fleeing to exile. In 1967, Obote's power was cemented when the parliament passed a new constitution that abolished the federal structure of the independence constitution and created an executive presidency.

== First presidency ==
On 19 December 1969, there was an assassination attempt against Obote. As he was leaving the UPC annual delegates' conference at Lugogo Indoor Stadium in Kampala, Mohamed Sebaduka fired one shot at the president. The bullet struck Obote in the face, breaking two of his teeth and passing through his cheek. Sebaduka's pistol jammed, and another assassin, Yowana Wamala, threw a grenade at the president, but it failed to explode. Sebaduka was shot by Obote's bodyguards, but both conspirators escaped in the pandemonium following the attempt. Investigators later arrested them and several members of the Democratic Party—the leading opposition party—accusing former prime minister Benedicto Kiwanuka of orchestrating the plot. In the aftermath of the attempt, all opposition political parties were banned, leaving Obote as an effectively supreme leader. A state of emergency was in force for much of the time and many political opponents were jailed without trial for life. Obote's regime terrorised, harassed, and tortured people. His secret police, the General Service Unit, led by Obote's cousin, was responsible for many cruelties.

In 1969–70, Obote published a series of pamphlets that were supposed to outline his political and economic policy. The Common Man's Charter was a summary of his approach to socialism, which became known as the Move to the Left. The government took over a 60% share in major private corporations and banks in the country in 1970. During Obote's regime, flagrant and widespread corruption emerged in the name of his version of "socialism". Food shortages sent prices through the ceiling. Obote's persecution of Indian traders contributed to this rise in prices.

The Israeli government was training the Ugandan police and military and providing arms to the Anyanya in Southern Sudan who were engaged in a guerilla war with the Sudanese government. The Obote government withdrew support for the rebels and arrested a German mercenary called Steiner and extradited him to Sudan for trial. The Israeli government was unhappy with these events.

In January 1971, Obote was overthrown by the army while on a visit to Singapore to attend a Commonwealth conference, and Amin became president. In the two years before the coup Obote's relations with the West had become strained. Some have suggested that Western Governments were at least aware of, and may have aided, the coup. The Israeli government certainly played an active role in planning and implementing the coup. They operated mechanized equipment and maintained a high profile in and around the capital including manning roadblocks. According to one source, "They were to be seen everywhere." The fall of Obote's regime was welcomed and celebrated by many Ugandans.

== First exile and attempts to regain power ==
Once he was informed of the coup, Obote immediately flew to Nairobi to rally loyalist army elements in Uganda to oppose Amin's takeover. However, Kenyan authorities blocked his attempts to contact his followers, and the remaining pro-Obote soldiers failed to organize a counteroffensive. The pro-Amin forces were consequently able to swiftly eliminate them in a series of purges. Still, Obote refused to give up, and moved to Tanzania where he received much more support. Tanzanian President Julius Nyerere had close ties with Obote and had supported his socialist orientation. The Tanzanian and Somali governments initially planned to help Obote regain power by invading Uganda through the Kagera Salient. This project was never implemented, as Chinese Premier Zhou Enlai informed the involved parties that he opposed a military intervention, while the Tanzanians feared that Western powers might intervene on Amin's side. At this point, Obote's loyalists in the Uganda Army had been crushed, and Nyerere offered Obote training camps in Tanzania to organize a guerrilla army in exile. Meanwhile, thousands of Obote supporters (including many soldiers) escaped to Sudan whose government also offered them sanctuary and training camps. From late March 1971, Obote built up a rebel army, and moved to Sudan.

However, Obote's exile efforts were hampered by his lack of support among Ugandans, as many other opposition groups—both leftists and conservatives—were more willing to support Amin than offer him any aid. Even part of the UPC had decided to split from him. There were also considerable ethnic tensions as well as personal rivalries in Obote's camps, undermining the military training. In addition, the Sudanese government signed a treaty with Amin in early 1972, expelling Obote and his followers, greatly weakening them. Overall, Obote was unable to mobilize more than about 1,000 insurgents, many of whom lacked proper training. As tensions mounted between Tanzania and Uganda, even escalating in occasional border clashes, Nyerere finally greenlit the planned invasion. Even some exiles critical of Obote, such as Yoweri Museveni's group, joined the operation. The 1972 invasion of Uganda by Obote's rebel alliance was a military disaster, with much of the insurgent force destroyed. This failure contributed to the existing tensions among the anti-Amin forces. On his part, Obote would accuse Museveni of having lied about controlling an underground network in southern Uganda. This alleged network was supposed to cause a popular uprising, but the latter did not materialize, thereby contributing to the invasion's defeat. Obote never forgave Museveni for this, creating a lasting rift. The attempted invasion was also met with international condemnation, forcing the Tanzanian government to officially close the insurgent camps and pledge to stop supporting anti-Amin rebels. Obote and members of his inner circle consequently relocated to Dar es Salaam where many began to work as teachers, lawyers, doctors, etc., while his common fighters were moved to Tabora to become coffee farmers.

The Tanzanian government informed Obote that it would continue tolerating anti-Amin insurgent activities as long as they remained clandestine, despite the international agreement signed after the failed invasion. As a result, Obote kept a low-profile in the next years, as he continued his efforts to regain power. As he had not siphoned off money to overseas banks during his first presidency, Obote mostly lived off a Tanzanian pension. He gave no more interviews, and rarely ventured abroad to meet other opposition figures. Most of the time, he stayed at a comfortable beach house close to Nyerere's private residence; Tanzanian officials initially continued to call him "President", and later "Mzee". Despite his rare public appearances and public restraint, Obote vigorously plotted to overthrow Amin: He set up a small rebel force of 100 guerrillas which occasionally launched raids from Kenya into Uganda, and created his own "navy" of six boats which smuggled coffee on Lake Victoria to finance political and militant activities. The navy also built up an underground network in Uganda. These operations were entrusted to some of his most trusted followers such as David Oyite-Ojok. Obote hoped to gradually undermine Amin's regime until being able to launch a general uprising with support by the exiles in Tanzania. However, the efforts of his rebel network produced few tangible results, as his movement was unable to assassinate important followers of Amin and lacked support among most Ugandans. In fact, Obote remained deeply unpopular in much of Uganda, and even those opposed to Amin did not want to see him return to power.

== Second presidency ==
In 1979, Idi Amin was ousted by Tanzanian forces aided by Ugandan exiles. By 1980, Uganda was governed by an interim Presidential Commission. At the time of the 1980 elections, the chairman of the commission was a close associate of Obote, Paulo Muwanga. Muwanga had briefly been the de facto President of Uganda from 12–20 May 1980, as one of three presidents who served for short periods of time between Amin's ousting and the setting up of the Presidential Commission. The other two presidents were Yusuf Lule and Godfrey Binaisa.

The elections in 1980 were won by Obote's Uganda People's Congress (UPC) party. However, the UPC's opposition believed that the elections were rigged, which led to a guerrilla war by Yoweri Museveni's National Resistance Army (NRA) and several other military groups. Obote held the additional title of Minister of Finance.

In 1983, the Obote government launched Operation Bonanza, a military expedition that claimed tens of thousands of lives and displaced a significant portion of the population. The brunt of the blame for this massacre was placed on the people of northern Uganda for supporting the action of the Prime Minister which increased the existing regional tensions in the country. It has been estimated that approximately 100,000 to 500,000 people died as a result of fighting between Obote's Uganda National Liberation Army (UNLA) and the guerrillas.

On 27 July 1985, Obote was deposed again. As in 1971, he was overthrown by his own army commanders in a military coup d'état; this time the commanders were Brigadier Bazilio Olara-Okello and General Tito Okello. The two men briefly ruled the country through a Military Council, but after a few months of near-chaos, Museveni's NRA seized control of the country. By July 1985, Amnesty International estimated that the Obote regime had been responsible for more than 300,000 civilian deaths across Uganda. Abuses were particularly conspicuous in an area of central Uganda known as the Luweero Triangle.

== Death in exile ==
After his second removal from power, Obote fled to Kenya and later to Zambia. For some years, it was rumoured that he would return to Ugandan politics. In August 2005, however, he announced his intention to step down as leader of the UPC. In September 2005, it was reported that Obote would return to Uganda before the end of the year. On 10 October 2005, Obote died of kidney failure in a hospital in Johannesburg, South Africa at the age of 79.

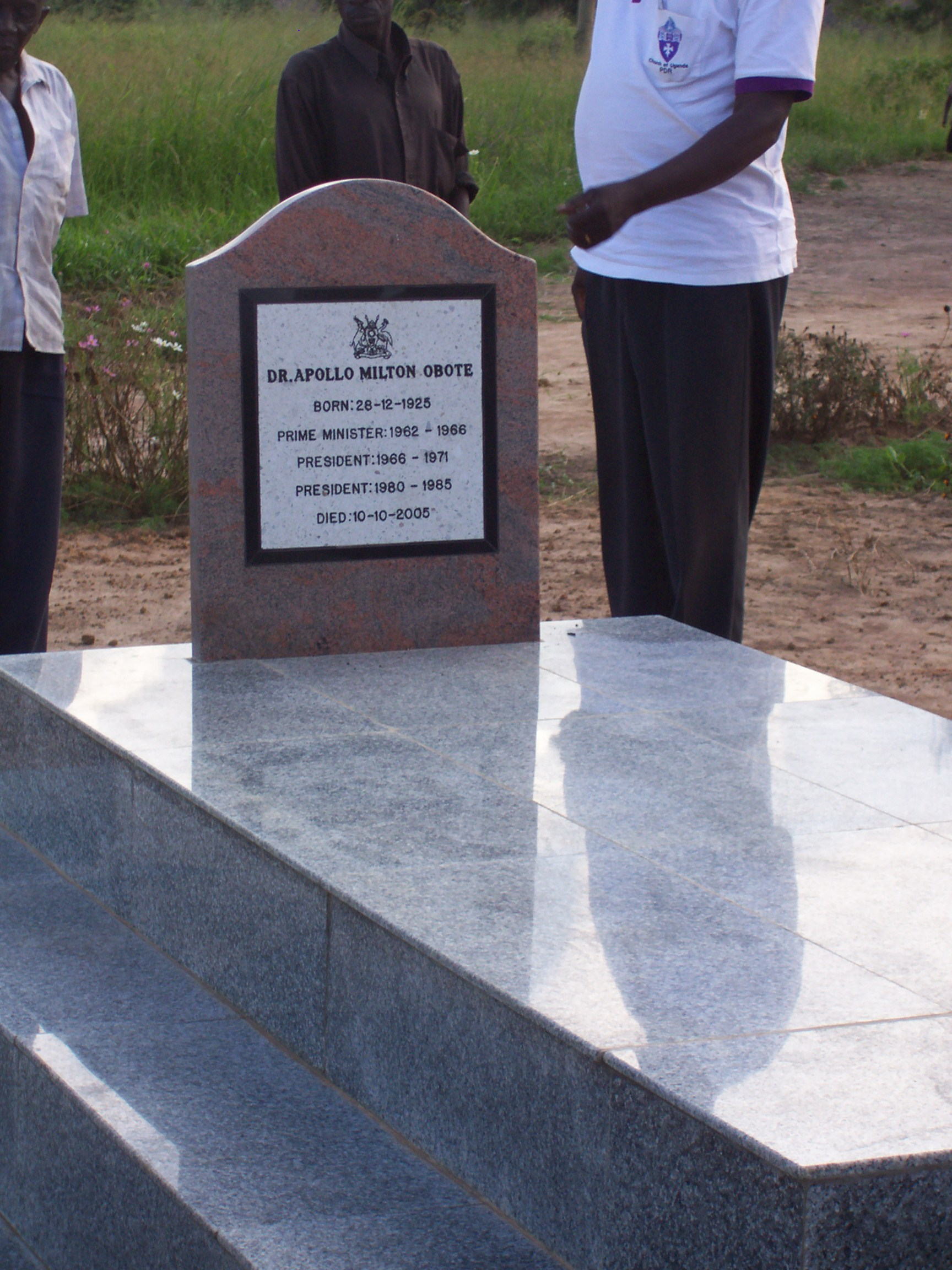
Milton Obote's grave

Milton Obote was given a state funeral, attended by President Museveni, in the Ugandan capital Kampala in October 2005, to the surprise and appreciation of many Ugandans because he and Museveni had been bitter rivals. Other groups, such as the Baganda survivors of the Luweero Triangle massacres, were bitter that Obote was given a state funeral.

He was survived by his wife and five children. On 28 November 2005, his wife Miria Obote was elected UPC's president.

Political offices
| Preceded by none | President of the Uganda People's Congress; 1959–2005 | Succeeded by Miria Obote |
| Preceded by Benedicto Kiwanuka | Prime Minister of Uganda; 1962–1966 | Succeeded by Otema Allimadi post abolished 1966–1980 |
| Preceded by Edward Mutesa | President of Uganda; 1966–1971 | Succeeded by Idi Amin |
| Preceded by Presidential Commission of Uganda | President of Uganda; 1980–1985 | Succeeded by Tito Okello Lutwa |
