= Tito Okello =

President of Uganda from 1985 to 1986

General Tito Lutwa Okello

8th President of Uganda
- In office 29 July 1985 – 26 January 1986
- Preceded by: Bazilio Olara-Okello
- Succeeded by: Yoweri Museveni

Personal details
- Born: Tito Lutwa Okello; 15 October 1914 Kitgum District, Uganda
- Died: 3 June 1996 (aged 81) Kampala, Uganda

Military service
- Allegiance: British Empire; Uganda
- Branch/service: British Army; Uganda Army; Uganda National Liberation Army (UNLA)
- Years of service: 1940–1962 (British Empire); 1962–1971 (Uganda Army); 1979–1986 (UNLA)
- Rank: General
- Unit: King's African Rifles; Uganda Army; Uganda National Liberation Army
- Battles/wars: Second World War; East African Campaign; 1972 invasion of Uganda; Uganda–Tanzania War; Ugandan Bush War

Tito Lutwa Okello (15 October 1914 – 3 June 1996) was a Ugandan military officer and politician who served as the president of Uganda from 29 July 1985 until 26 January 1986.

== Background ==
Tito Okello was born into an ethnic Acholi family in circa 1914 in Namokora, Kitgum District.

He joined the King's African Rifles in 1940 and served in the East African Campaign of World War II. As a career military officer, he had a variety of assignments.

As a follower of President Milton Obote, Okello went into exile following the 1971 coup d'état that resulted in Idi Amin becoming Uganda's new ruler. In 1972, rebels invaded Uganda to restore Obote. Okello was one of the leaders of an insurgent group which targeted Masaka. The invasion was defeated by loyalist Uganda Army troops.

Okello took part in the Uganda–Tanzania War. He was one of the commanders in the coalition between the Tanzania People's Defence Force and the Uganda National Liberation Army (UNLA) that removed Amin from power in 1979. In 1980, Obote was restored to presidency. Okello was selected to be the Commander of the UNLA from 1980 to 1985.

== Coup d'état ==
In July 1985, together with Bazilio Olara-Okello, Tito Lutwa Okello staged the coup d'état that toppled President Obote. Okello ruled as president for six months until he had to transfer power to the National Resistance Army (NRA) operating under the leadership of the current president, Yoweri Museveni. He went into exile in Kenya after his tenure was forcibly terminated by Museveni.

== Family ==
Tito Okello's son Henry Oryem Okello is the current State Minister for Foreign Affairs responsible for International Affairs. In 2002, Tito Okello's younger brother, Erisanweri Opira, was abducted from his home in Kitgum District by the rebel group, the Lord's Resistance Army (LRA). His abduction was considered unusual as the LRA usually kidnapped teenagers and young people to use as prospective soldiers or sex slaves. Opira was in his late seventies when he was abducted.

== Final years ==
Okello remained in exile until 1993, when he was granted amnesty by President Museveni and returned to Kampala. He died three years later on 3 June 1996, at the age of 81. He was buried at his ancestral home in Kitgum District, Namokora subcounty.

== Legacy and honours ==
In January 2010, Okello was posthumously awarded the Kagera National Medal of Honour for fighting against the Idi Amin dictatorship in the 1970s.

== See also ==
- Uganda since 1979, part of the History of Uganda series.
- President of Uganda
- Politics of Uganda
- Okello Oryem
- Rose Nakasi
- Grace Ndeezi
- Stella Nyanzi

Political offices
Preceded by Bazilio Olara-Okello	President of Uganda; 29 July 1985 – 26 January 1986	Succeeded by Yoweri Museveni
