= Rosemary Kisembo =

Ugandan computer scientist and corporate executive

- Born: Uganda
- Citizenship: Uganda
- Education: Makerere University (Bachelor of Commerce) (Master of Information Systems); Microsoft Corporation (Microsoft SQR Server Certified Professional)
- Occupations: Software engineer and corporate executive
- Years active: 1990–present
- Title: Executive director of the National Identification and Registration Authority of Uganda

Rosemary Kisembo is a Ugandan software engineer and corporate executive, who serves as the executive director of the National Identification and Registration Authority of Uganda (NIRA) effective 14 May 2021. She took over from Judy Obitre–Gama, a lawyer, whose contract ended in 2020 and was not extended.

== Background and education ==
Kisembo was born in Uganda and she attended local primary and secondary schools. She was then admitted to Makerere University, Uganda's oldest and largest public university, graduating with a Bachelor of Commerce (BCom) degree. Later, she was awarded a Master of Information Systems (MIS) degree, also by Makerere. In addition, she is a Microsoft SQR Server Certified Professional.

== Career ==
Immediately before her present appointment, she was the Head of Information and Communications Technology (ICT) at the Uganda National Roads Authority (UNRA), a role she served in between 2016 and 2021. She served as Manager Software Engineering at UNRA for the period between 2011 and 2016. Before she joined UNRA, she worked at the Uganda Revenue Authority (URA), from 1995 until 2011, serving in the Corporate Services Department of URA.

She was hired at NIRA, following the recommendation of the president of Uganda, that the contract of Judy Obitre-Gama not be renewed. Kisembo had to also overcome initial resistance of some technocrats in the Ministry of Internal Affairs and members of the Public Service Commission, who initially viewed her as "unsuitable".

== Other considerations ==
According to Ugandan laws, Kisembo, in her capacity as the executive director of NIRA, became a member of the board of directors and is the secretary of that board.

It is expected that under her leadership, NIRA will re-configure the National Registration Card, making it electronically active and adding more features. The new re-designed NIRA card was expected to be issued to the public in 2024.

== See also ==
- Uganda Registration Services Bureau
