= William Banage =

- Born: 27 September 1933 (age 93); Tooro, Uganda
- Citizenship: Ugandan
- Education: Makerere University College; Durham University
- Known for: Zoology and academic research, Minister of Animal Industry, Game and Fisheries (1971–1972)
- Title: Emeritus Professor of Zoology
- Scientific career
- Fields: Zoology; Agricultural zoology
- Workplaces: Makerere University; University of Zambia
- Thesis: Studies on the nematode fauna of moorland soils (1960)

William Banage, also known as William Bazeterra Banage (born 27 September 1933), is a Ugandan zoologist, academic, and politician who served as Minister of Animal Industry, Game and Fisheries in Idi Amin's first Cabinet in 1971.

== Early life and education ==
Banage was born on 27 September 1933 in the Tooro region of Uganda. He attended Nyakasura School in Fort Portal before joining Makerere University College, where he studied biological and agricultural sciences. He later travelled to Britain to pursue postgraduate studies at the University of Durham, where he obtained a Doctor of Philosophy (DPhil) degree in 1960.

== Career ==
Banage started his career in the Faculty of Agriculture at Makerere, specializing in agricultural zoology before becoming a senior academic in the Department of Zoology and in 1968, he became head of the Department of Zoology.

He later entered politics. Following Idi Amin’s overthrow of Milton Obote on 25 January 1971, Amin formed his first Cabinet in February 1971, appointing him as Minister of Animal Industry, Game and Fisheries. However, Banage did not remain in Amin’s Cabinet for long as on 30 November 1972, Amin dismissed several ministers, including him, Apollo Kironde, and Yekosofati Engur.

After leaving government, Banage went into exile amid the difficult political environment under Idi Amin. He later became a professor at the University of Zambia. After several years abroad, he returned to Uganda through the United Nations Development Programme (UNDP) Transfer of Knowledge Through Expatriate Nationals (TOKTEN) programme, which enabled African professionals living abroad to contribute their expertise to institutions in their home countries. Banage initially returned to Makerere University on a short-term TOKTEN assignment. However, after his contract with the University of Zambia expired, he chose to remain in Uganda and subsequently returned to Makerere permanently.

He continued his academic career at Makerere University and later became Emeritus Professor of Zoology at the university. He was also a Fellow of the Uganda National Academy of Sciences (UNAS).

== See also ==
- Herbert Kanabi Nsubuga
- Joshua Wanume Kibedi
- Emmanuel Bwayo Wakhweya
- Charles Oboth Ofumbi
