= Ernest Obitre Gama =

Ugandan former military officer and diplomat

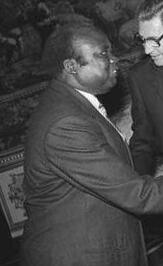
- Obitre Gama in 1987

Minister of Internal Affairs of Uganda
- In office 2 February 1971 – 12 October 1973
- President: Idi Amin
- Preceded by: Basil Kiiza Bataringaya
- Succeeded by: Charles Oboth Ofumbi

Ugandan Ambassador to Japan
- In office 1986–1987
- President: Yoweri Museveni

Ugandan ambassador to Italy
- In office 1987–1988
- President: Yoweri Museveni

Ugandan ambassador to Sudan
- In office 1988 – April 1995
- President: Yoweri Museveni

Personal details
- Born: 1 January 1940 (age 86) Olevu, British Uganda (present-day Uganda)
- Spouse: Zilipah Enaru
- Children: Six Children with his wife, including Judy Obitre–Gama, Eyoki Obitre Gama, Jocelyn Obitre Gama, Robina Obitre Gama, Afimani Obitre Gama, and Gordon Obitre Gama. He also claims to have other children
- Education: Busoga College

Military service
- Allegiance: Uganda Army
- Branch/service: Uganda
- Years of service: 1964 - 1979
- Battles/wars: 1972 invasion of Uganda; Uganda-Tanzania War

Ernest Obitre Gama (born 1 November 1940) is a Ugandan former military officer and diplomat. He was the first military officer in Uganda to become a diplomat, and was appointed Minister of Internal Affairs by Idi Amin. He later was the Ugandan ambassador to Japan, Italy, and Sudan under Yoweri Museveni.

== Early life ==
Ernest Obitre Gama was born into a Lugbara family of farmers in the West Nile sub-region in the Northern Region of Uganda. He was born in the village of Olevu, in Maracha Town, in the West Nile sub-region on 15 November in 1940. He was orphaned at a young age, and did not attend school until he was 12 years old.

=== Education ===
Obitre Gama attended local schools in Maracha Town area from 1952 to 1960, when, at the age of 20, he enrolled in Busoga College, a boarding secondary school located at Mwiri Hill in the Jinja District of Uganda. He earned his school certificate in 1963. His goal was to become a marine engineer and work in Mombasa, Kenya, but his guardians objected and told him to enlist in the Uganda People's Defence Force.

== Career ==
=== Armed Forces ===
On 5 June 1964, Obitre Gama joined the Uganda Army. In January 1965 he was commissioned and went to the Specialist Weapons School at Battlesbury Barracks in Warminster, Wiltshire in the United Kingdom where was trained to be a platoon commander. Upon his return to Uganda he was immediately sent to Zaire, but after a short time in Zaire he became the director of the Officer Cadet's Training School in Jinja, Uganda. In Jinja, Uganda, he performed the first paratroop jump by a Ugandan paratrooper in Ugandan airspace. This was also when he first met Idi Amin.

After serving as the director of the Officer Cadet's Training School in Jinja, Uganda, Obitre Gama travelled extensively on behalf of the Uganda People's Defence Force. In December 1967 he attended advanced military training in India, then went to the Defence Services Staff College in Wellington, New Zealand, after which he traveled to Israel for a five-month long course in parachute training. Following his parachute training course in Israel, Obitre Gama became the commandant and founder of the Ugandan School of Paratroopers. In 1969, Obitre Gana went on a tour of India, the Soviet Union, and Czechoslovakia where he represented the Uganda People's Defence Force.

When the 1971 Ugandan coup d'état occurred on 25 January 1971, Obitre Gama was working in Trinidad and Tobago. He was sent by President Apollo Milton Obote to represent Uganda as a member of the Commonwealth of Nations who were assisting in the military tribunals of members of the Black Power Revolution, a series of demonstrations and strikes that attempted to effect socio-political change in Trinidad and Tobago. Obitre Gama was observing the trials of Raffique Shah and Rex Lassalle, members of the Trinidad and Tobago Defence Force who mutinied in response to Prime Minister of Trinidad and Tobago Eric Williams calling a state of emergency and arresting leaders of the Black Power Revolution.

=== Minister of Internal Affairs ===
Following the 1971 Ugandan coup d'état, Idi Amin called for Obitre Gama to return to Uganda immediately. Obitre Gama learned of the coup d'état in his home country through a BBC Radio broadcast. He was appointed to be Minister of Internal Affairs on 2 February, replacing the imprisoned and soon-to-be executed Basil Kiiza Bataringaya. He was the first soldier to be a member of the Cabinet of Uganda, a role he tried to turn down and a role he did not seek. Obitre Gama's most influential action as Minister of Internal Affairs was leading a mechanized battalion to restore order to Kampala in February 1972 following ethnic conflict within the city.

Cracks quickly emerged between Obitre Gama and Idi Amin. Obitre Gama refused to promote Juma Butabika, the violent Idi Amin ally, to the role of Senior Superintendent of Police out of what Obitre Gama described as concerns for his violent behavior. In May 1972, Amin allegedly snubbed a hand shake from Obitre Gama at a conference at Serena Hotel, Kampala, saying "I don't want to see you. You want to overthrow me". The ever erratic Idi Amin actually followed this by appointing Obitre Gama to be Minister of Power, Transport, and Communication in June 1972, a role that he served concurrently with his role as Minister of Internal Affairs, although he was retired from both roles by Idi Amin "for the public interest". Charles Oboth Ofumbi replaced Obitre Gama as Minister of Internal Affairs.

=== Interim Period ===
Obitre Gama returned to his home in Olevu in Maracha Town following his retirement from Minister of Internal Affairs. In 1979, during the Uganda–Tanzania War, the Uganda Army attempted to recall Obitre Gama back into the armed forces, but he declined. He did not flee into the Democratic Republic of the Congo nine kilometers from his home like many other former Idi Amin officials, rather he stayed when the Tanzania People's Defence Force came in and met with new Ugandan President Godfrey Binaisa who promised Obitre Gama safety and allegedly asked Obitre Gama to become Minister of Minerals, a position Obitre Gama declined. Obitre Gama kept a low profile during the second Apollo Milton Obote administration.

=== Ambassador for Museveni ===
When Yoweri Museveni took power, Obitre Gama reentered Ugandan political life, this time as a diplomat. He was appointed Ambassador to Japan in 1986, then Ambassador to Italy in 1987, and Sudan in 1988. He remained as ambassador to Sudan until 1995, when Uganda suspended relations with Sudan following Ugandan military assistance of the rebel Sudan People's Liberation Army and their sending of Ugandan troops into Sudan.

=== Life after Politics ===
Obitre Gama has worked since 2000 as the Chairman of the Amnesty Commission's North-Western Region Directorate. The Amnesty Commission came out of the Amnesty Act of 2000 which states that "any forces that are fighting the government (of Uganda) and wish to give-up are free to report and will be forgiven when they denounce their activities".

== Personal life ==
Obitre Gama is a diabetic.

Obitre Gama married Zilipah Enaru before he became Minister of Internal Affairs. He lives with her in the same house in Olevu in Maracha Town since he left the Ministry of Internal Affairs. Obitre Gama has six children with his wife, including Eyoki Obitre Gama, Jocelyn Obitre Gama, Robina Obitre Gama, Afimani Obitre Gama, Gordon Obitre Gama, and Judy Obitre–Gama, the former Executive Director of the National Identification and Registration Authority in Uganda, previous Board Secretary of the Uganda Registration Services Bureau, and is a noted scholar and environmental lawyer. He also claimed in an interview with Sidney Miria of the New Vision newspaper to have other children.

Obitre Gama was a noted sportsman as well, winning Ugandan-wide competitions in Rugby union and Squash.

== Bibliography ==
- Legum, Colin, ed. (1971). Africa Contemporary Record : Annual Survey and Documents : 1970–1971. Vol. III. London: Rex Colongs. OCLC 867231758.
