= NMSS =

NMSS may refer to:

- National Multiple Sclerosis Society, a U.S. nonprofit
- Office of Nuclear Material Safety and Safeguards (NMSS), Nuclear Regulatory Commission; of the U.S. federal government
- National Movement for Simeon II (NMSS), a Bulgarian political party
- Nkuutu Memorial Secondary School, Bugweri, Uganda
- New Media Summer School, a project of the Association des États Généraux des Étudiants de l'Europe (English: European Students Forum)
- NMSS (nuclear-powered missile ship, strategic), a fictional type of warship; see List of fictional ships

== See also ==
- NMS (disambiguation), for the singular of NMSs
