= Maracha =

Maracha may refer to one of the following

- Maracha District, a district in the West Nile sub-region of Northern Uganda
- Maracha Town, a town in Maracha District, where the district headquarters are located
- Maracha people, a subset of Lugbara people
- Maracha language, a dialect of Lugbara language.
