= Mukiibi =

Mukiibi is a surname. Notable people with the surname include:

- Ibrahim Mukiibi (born 1935), Ugandan minister
- Regina Mukiibi, Ugandan businesswoman
- Ronald Mukiibi (born 1991), Swedish footballer
- Abby Mukiibi Nkaaga, Ugandan actor
