= Judy Obitre–Gama =

Ugandan lawyer, academic and corporate executive

- Born: Uganda
- Education: Makerere University (Bachelor of Laws); Law Development Center (Diploma in Legal Practice); University of London (Master of Laws)
- Occupations: Lawyer, academic, civil servant
- Years active: 1999 – present
- Known for: Civil Service
- Title: Executive Director; National Identification and Registration Authority
- Father: Ernest Obitre Gama

Judy Obitre–Gama, also Judy Obitre Gama, is a Ugandan lawyer, academic and civil servant. She is the former executive director of the National Identification and Registration Authority in Uganda.

== Background and education ==
Obitre–Gama holds a Bachelor of Laws from Makerere University, a Diploma in Legal Practice from the Law Development Centre and a Master of Laws from the University of London.

== Career ==
She served as a lecturer in the Faculty of Law at Makerere University. Prior to that, she served as an environmental lawyer with the National Environment Management Authority of Uganda. For three years, ending December 2009, she served as the Head of Legal & Surveillance and Company Secretary at the Uganda Securities Exchange. Between July 2012 and June 2015, she served as the Board Secretary of Uganda Registration Services Bureau. She was sworn in as the new Executive Director of NIRA on 15 July 2015.

== See also ==
- Uganda Registration Services Bureau
