= Malyamu Amin =

- Born: Sarah Mutesi Kibedi; Busoga, Uganda Protectorate
- Known for: First wife of Idi Amin
- Spouse: Idi Amin (m. 1966; div. 1974)
- Children: Hussein Lumumba, Ali, Mwanga, Ramadhan
- Relatives: Joshua Wanume Kibedi (brother)

Malyamu Amin (Born c. 1939- Died[ Year of death missing]) also known as Malyamu Kibedi Amin, was the First Lady to Idi Amin.

== Personal and historical life ==
Born Sarah Mutesi Kibedi, she adopted the name "Malyamu" after coverting to Islam. She was from Busoga from a renowned family of Elkanah Kibedi, who was the headmaster of Busoga College Mwiri. She was sister to Joshua Wanume Kibedi. Joshua was the Minister of Foreign Affairs during the regime of President Idi Amin. Malyamu met Amin in 1953 when she was 22 years old and they officially married in 1966.

In 1973, her brother Joshua Wanume Kibedi, Uganda's Foreign Minister, resigned and went into exile after the murder of their uncle, Shaban Nkutu, ordered by President Amin. Her brother denounced Amin, becoming a leading critic of Idi Amin's dictatorship leading to the torture of his family. Malyamu then fled the country via Kenya, leaving her children with their father. She was arrested in Tororo, near the Kenyan border, in April 1974, accused of attempting to smuggle fabric into Kenya. However, she was able to flee to the United Kingdom through the aid of the then Vice-President of Kenya, Daniel Arap Moi. Idi Amin declared his divorce from his first wife shortly afterwards.

== See also ==
- The Last King of Scotland (film)
- Idi Amin
- January 1973
- Joshua Wanume Kibedi
