= Nabwiso =

Nabwiso is a surname, commonly used in Uganda. Notable people with the surname include:

- Eleanor Nabwiso, Ugandan actress, producer, director and television personality
- Frank Nabwiso (1940–2024), Ugandan educator and politician
- Mathew Nabwiso, Ugandan actor
