= Shaban Nkutu =

Minister of Works, Housing, Transport and Communications
- In office 1967–1971
- Constituency: Busoga South East

Personal details
- Born: Shaban Kirunda Nkutu; 15 November 1930 Nakibembe, Bugweri County, Uganda
- Died: 11 January 1973 (aged 42) Jinja, Uganda
- Resting place: Busesa, Bugweri, Uganda
- Citizenship: Uganda
- Party: Uganda People's Congress
- Education: Busoga College Mwiri; Kibuli Secondary School; Makerere College
- Occupation: Teacher, politician

Shaban Nkutu, also known as Shaban Kirunda Nkutu (15 November 1930), was a Ugandan cabinet minister and politician who served as a representative of Busoga South East in the Parliament of Uganda.

== Early life and education background ==
Nkutu was born on 15 November 1930 in Nakibembe village, Bugweri County, in Iganga District to Haji Ausi Kirunda and Zafalan Namuwaya. He studied at Busoga College Mwiri, Kibuli SS and Makerere College.

== Career ==
Nkutu began his career as a teacher and later served as a headmaster at Bwala in Masaka. In 1962, he was elected to Parliament, representing Busoga South-East on the Uganda People's Congress (UPC) ticket. He was appointed a deputy minister in 1963 before later becoming a cabinet minister.

He served as Deputy Minister of Education from 1963 to 1964 and as Deputy Minister of Works from 1964 to 1966. During the same period, he also served as the Uganda People's Congress (UPC) Government Chief Whip from 1964 to 1966. From 1966 to 1967, he served as Minister of Health. He later served as Minister of Works, Housing, Transport and Communications from 1967 to 1971.

Nkutu also served as National Chairman of the Uganda People's Congress (UPC) from 1968 to 1973. He was also the National Chairman of the National Association for the Advancement of Muslims (NAAM). Following Idi Amin's military coup in January 1971, Nkutu was arrested and detained for several months. After his release, he withdrew from active politics and returned to private business in Jinja and Kampala.

On 11 January 1973, Nkutu was abducted by security forces in Jinja and subsequently killed by forces loyal to Idi Amin. His body was secretly buried and his family spent several years searching for his remains. The remains were later located, and Nkutu was reburied at his home in Busesa, Bugweri, in February 2005.

== Legacy ==
In recognition of his contribution to Uganda, Jinja Municipal Council renamed Allidina Road as Shaban Nkutu Memorial Road. Nkuutu Memorial Secondary School was also established in Busesa in his memory.

== See also ==
- Joshua Wanume Kibedi
- Kirunda Kivejinja
