= Sherifah Tumusiime =

Ugandan Computer Scientist

- Born: July 13, 1988 (age 38)
- Citizenship: Ugandan
- Education: Bachelor of Computer Science ,Business and Entrepreneurship
- Alma mater: Makerere University, Clark Atlanta University
- Occupations: Computer scientist, businesswoman, entrepreneur
- Notable work: founder and Chief Executive Officer of Zimba Group Ltd
- Awards: Women Entrepreneurship and Investment Champion Award Women by Coalition for Digital Equality (CODE) in 2021, Commonwealth Youth Award 2018

Sherifah Tumusiime (Born July 13, 1988), alias "Chief Hustler" is a Ugandan Computer scientist, businesswoman, entrepreneur, and technology advocate. She is the founder and Chief Executive Officer of Zimba Group Ltd flagship project, Zimba Women, a technology social enterprise supports and resources women entrepreneurs in East Africa, founder of The Baby Store UG, and Senior Systems Officer at Uganda Financial Intelligence Authority(FIA) in Uganda.

She is a 2015 Mandela Washington Fellow and the regional winner (Africa and Europe) for the Commonwealth Youth Award 2018, a speaker at international conferences, such as RightsCon in Silicon Valley and the Shoko Digital Festival in Harare, Zimbabwe.

== Education ==
Tumusiime attended Mount Saint Mary's College Namagunga , then did a Bachelor of Computer Science at Makerere University from 2008–2011 and Business and Entrepreneurship at Clark Atlanta University in 2015.

== Career ==
Tumusiime is the Founder, CEO of Zimba Zimba Group Ltd from December 2014 to date, which currently collaborates with over 15,000 female entrepreneurs and Senior Systems Officer at Uganda Financial Intelligence Authority (FIA). She founded Baby Store started 2012 as an e-commerce store selling baby products, worked at Wipro Info Tech as Data Centre monitoring team lead in 2011 till she became a Tools team lead in 2014, and a Service Desk Administrator at MTN Uganda, April 2009 – Nov 2011.

== Awards ==
- Mandela Washington Fellowship for Young African Leaders 2015.
- MTN Women in Business: Excellence in ICT Award 2017.
- Commonwealth Youth Award, Regional Winner (Africa & Europe) in 2018.
- Women Entrepreneurship and Investment Champion Award Women by Coalition for Digital Equality (CODE) in 2021.

== See also ==
- Zari Hassan
