= List of ministers of foreign affairs of Uganda =

This article lists the ministers of foreign affairs of Uganda since the country gained independence from the United Kingdom on 9 October 1962.

== List of ministers ==
No.	Name	From	To	Notes
1	Milton Obote	1962	1966	Sam Odaka was minister of State from 1964 to 1966
2	Sam Odaka	1966	1971	
3	Joshua Wanume Kibedi	1971	1973	
	Paul Etyang	1973	1973	In acting capacity
4	Michael Ondoga	1973	1974	
5	Princess Elizabeth of Tooro	1974	1974	Princess (Batebe) of the Tooro Kingdom
6	Idi Amin	1974	1975	First tenure; Juma Oris served as acting minister during this time
7	Juma Oris	1975	1978	
8	Idi Amin	1978	1979	Second tenure
9	Juma Bashir	?	1979	Last foreign minister under the Amin regime; fled to Juba (then in Sudan) during the Uganda–Tanzania War
10	Otema Allimadi	1979	1979	
11	Godfrey Binaisa	1979	1979	
12	Otema Allimadi	1979	1980	
13	Milton Obote	1980	1985	
14	John Luwuliza Kirunda	1985	1985	
15	Olara Otunnu	1985	1986	
16	Ibrahim Mukiibi	1986	1988	
17	Paul Ssemogerere	1988	1994	
18	Ruhakana Rugunda	1994	1996	
19	Eriya Kategaya	1996	2001	
20	James Wapakhabulo	2001	2004	Died in office
	Tom Butime	2004	2005	In acting capacity
21	Sam Kutesa	2005	2014	
	Henry Oryem Okello	2014	2015	In acting capacity while Sam Kutesa was President of the United Nations General Assembly
22	Sam Kutesa	2015	2021	
23	Jeje Odongo	2021	2026	
24	Adonia Ayebare	2026	Incumbent	

== See also ==
- Ministry of Foreign Affairs (Uganda)
- Foreign relations of Uganda
- List of diplomatic missions of Uganda
- List of ministers of internal affairs of Uganda
- List of ministers of justice and constitutional affairs of Uganda

== Bibliography ==
- "B. UGANDA" (PDF). Keesing's Record of World Events. 21. August 1975.
- Seftel, Adam, ed. (2010) [1st pub. 1994]. Uganda: The Bloodstained Pearl of Africa and Its Struggle for Peace. From the Pages of Drum. Kampala: Fountain Publishers. ISBN 978-9970-02-036-2.
