= Oryema =

Oryema is a surname. Notable people with the surname include:

- Erinayo Wilson Oryema (1917–1977), Ugandan police officer and politician
- Geoffrey Oryema (1953–2018), Ugandan musician
