= List of ministers of internal affairs of Uganda =

== List of ministers of internal affairs of Uganda ==
Since independence from the United Kingdom on 9 October 1962, Uganda has had the following ministers of internal affairs:

No.	Name	From	To	Head of state	Notes
-	G Oda	1960	1962	Benedicto Kiwanuka	Oda was minister under Prime Minister Benedicto Kiwanuka and the first to take the title of minister and not secretary. He was Minister of Internal Affairs under the transitional government.
1	Cuthbert Joseph Obwangor	1962	1964	Apollo Milton Obote	Obwangor was Minister of Regional Administration which briefly assumed the responsibilities of the Ministry of Internal Affairs.
1	Felix Kenyi Onama	1962	1964	Apollo Milton Obote	Onama also can lay claim to the Minister of Interior position between 1962 and 1964, as he was Minister of Works and Labour. That role assumed some of the other responsibilities of the Minister of Interior like leading the police.
2	Basil Kiiza Bataringaya	1964	1971	Apollo Milton Obote	Basil Kiiza Bataringaya headed the newly created Ministry of Home Affairs, later renamed Ministry of Internal Affairs. He assumed the role after he flipped parties and joined the Obote administration.
3	Lt. Col. Ernest Obitre Gama	1971	1973	Idi Amin	
4	Charles Oboth‐Ofumbi	1973	16 February 1977	Idi Amin	
5	Paulo Muwanga	1978	1980	Yusuf Lule	
5	Paulo Muwanga	1978	1980	Godfrey Binaisa	
5	Paulo Muwanga	1978	1980	Presidential Commission of Uganda	
5	Paulo Muwanga	1978	1980	Paulo Muwanga	Paulo Muwanga became head of state briefly when the Presidential Commission of Uganda gave him the powers of the President of Uganda from 22 May to 15 December 1980, where he also was Minister of Internal Affairs.
6	John Mikloth Magoola Luwuliza-Kirunda	1981	1985	Apolo Milton Obote (Second Administration)	Dr. John M. M. Luwuliza Kirunda left the role when he became Foreign Minister
7	Paul Ssemogerere	1985	1988	General Bazilio Olara-Okello	Paul Ssemogerere left the position when he became Foreign minister
7	Paul Ssemogerere	1985	1988	General Tito Okello	Paul Ssemogerere left the position when he became Foreign minister
7	Paul Ssemogerere	1985	1988	Yoweri Museveni	Paul Ssemogerere left the position when he became Foreign minister
7	Paul Ssemogerere	1985	1988	Yoweri Museveni	Paul Ssemogerere stayed on for the beginning of Yoweri Museveni's administration.
8	Kahinda Otafiire	1988	1989	Yoweri Museveni	Maj. Kahinda Otafiire had to resign as Minister of Internal Affairs after he brandished a pistol at a woman at a Kampala bar.
9	Ibrahim Mukiibi	1989	1994	Yoweri Museveni	
10	Crispus Kiyonga	1994	1996	Yoweri Museveni	
11	Eriya Kategaya	1996	2001	Yoweri Museveni	
12	James Wapakhabulo	2001	2004	Yoweri Museveni	Died in office
13	Tom Butime	2004	2005	Yoweri Museveni	In acting capacity
14	Hilary Onek	27 May 2011	23 May 2013	Yoweri Museveni	
15	Aronda Nyakairima	23 May 2013	12 September 2015	Yoweri Museveni	
16	Rose Akol	13 November 2015	6 June 2016	Yoweri Museveni	
17	Jeje Odongo	6 June 2016	Present	Yoweri Museveni	

== See also ==
- Ministry of Internal Affairs (Uganda)
- Cabinet of Uganda
- List of ministers of foreign affairs of Uganda
- List of ministers of justice and constitutional affairs of Uganda
