= Move to the Left =

Socialist political movement in Uganda

The Move to the Left was a policy direction undertaken in Uganda, most notably under President Milton Obote in the period 1968–1971. Despite nominally being a move towards socialism, it also had strong nationalist overtones.

The heart of the move to the left can be simply stated. It is... that political and economic power must be vested in the majority

— Uganda People's Congress, Common Man's Charter, 1969

== Beginnings ==
According to Akena Adoko, former head of the General Service Unit in Uganda, it took time for socialism to be established in Uganda because of the political realities of the time:

The first and nominal socialist phase was from 1952 to 1963 when the Uganda National Congress and later the UPC professed socialism. But it could not be implemented as the colonial administration preferred capitalism which they covered under the name 'mixed economy'. During the second phase from independence day certain socialist measures were implemented, but on the whole, the split in the Cabinet between leftists and rightists completely neutralised all efforts for the 'Move to the Left'. The word socialism was even scrapped from the party constitution, and was only reinstated after the 1966 crisis [when Obote turned to the Army and suspended the constitution in order to solidify his position].

— Akena Adoko, Work for Progress, Uganda's Second Five-Year Plan 1966-71 (Entebbe, 1966), 15

Between 1966 and 1969, however, little of a socialist bent was announced. Selwyn Ryan attributes this to Obote's political instability, suggesting that Obote "did not at first consider himself sufficiently strong politically to embark upon radical economic policies." Yash Tandon observed that "Obote has not until recently [1970] been free from the problems of maintaining the basic unity of the country.. [he] was always inclined towards a socialist path for Uganda, but for reasons of state and politics played this down between 1962 and 1968. The second Five Year Plan (roughly 1966-1971) noted the potential of the state-controlled Uganda Development Corporation, but also sought to promote small, private industry and attract foreign investment. There were few genuine socialists in Uganda, let alone socialists with genuine administrative ability. Of these, very few enjoyed the confidence of Obote.

It was in November 1968 that Obote remarked that Uganda was pursuing a "middle of the road strategy", one that was "neither left nor right", and predicted a leftwards swing in policy during 1969.

According to historian Amii Omara-Otunnu, Obote decided to undertake the Move to the Left to deemphasize his reliance on the Uganda Army to maintain his authority, which had become increasingly apparent after he deposed President Edward Mutesa and consolidated his power during the Mengo Crisis in 1966. He hoped that the policy change would broaden his popular appeal outside of the military and extend it to more of the civilian population.

== Key components ==
The Move to the Left was characterised by five key documents, adopted between October 1969 and the summer of 1970.

=== National Service Proposal ===
The National Service Proposal, adopted in October 1969, proposed that every able-bodied person should undertake two years of national service.

=== Common Man's Charter ===
The Common Man's Charter, which was published for comment in October 1969 and approved by the Party on 19 December, was the first major document that attempted to give definition to the Move to the Left. It stated that "the heart of the move to the left can be simply stated. It is.... that political and economic power must be vested in the majority", typifying the mixture of socialist and nationalist motivations the policy represented. The first step was to establish the state owned Uganda Commercial Bank and to require foreign banks operating in Uganda to re-incorporate in Uganda itself.

=== Communication from the Chair ===
The Communication from the Chair, adopted in April 1970, addressed inequalities among state employees. It proposed unified pay scales and an end to some privileges.

=== Nakivubo Pronouncement ===
Despite sentiments at the time that these moves had taken the momentum out of the push for socialism, by late 1969 Obote had decided that something more radical needed to be done. On 1 May 1970, he outlined his Nakivubo Pronouncement. It proclaimed that, with immediate effect, the government was to take control of 60% (up from at most 51%) of over 80 corporations in Uganda; they would now be run by state corporations, trade unions, municipal councils and cooperative unions. The list included all banks, insurance companies, manufacturing and mining industries, plantations, oil companies and transport undertakings in Uganda. The pronouncement added that a government monopoly would be enforced in Uganda's import-export markets with the exception of oil.

In reality, little preparation had been carried out, nor thought given to the pronouncement's consequences; it seems that the President did not even give the Cabinet any prior warning of his decision. The criteria for nationalisation were not made clear and there was great uncertainty as to whether the nationalisation exercise was complete. It was not even clear whether the nationalisation was supposed to complement the Africanisation of Uganda commerce or to re-prioritise it. The "governmental machine was thrown into the kind of incoherent muddle which became increasingly characteristic of the regime's final phase." The result was that nationalisation was never fully realised, and the government never took control of Uganda's major industries.

=== "Three Plus One" ===
The "Three Plus One" proposal proposed that each member of the National Assembly should stand in four seats simultaneously (their "home" seat plus three others).

== Evaluation ==
Ugandan commentators worried that the Move to the Left, insofar as it was socialist, could not co-exist with plans to Africanise the Ugandan economy, since the latter promoted African enterprise (what Ryan termed "petty bourgeois accumulation") in a way that was incompatible with the planned economy model of socialism. Particular vocal in their hostility to nationalisation were many UPC members of parliament, who were themselves business owners. Former Minister Sam Odaka tried to reassure them that this was not the case. "We appeal to people not to put wrong interpretations on the Common Man's Charter," he said. "It does not stop a person building ten houses if he does it properly." Ultimately, the issue was not resolved before the government was overthrown by a military coup in January 1971. There was no attempt to abandon the incentives that were being offered to promote African capitalism. This has led commentators such as Ryan to comment:

Whatever the motivations of Obote, the Move to the Left in Uganda must be seen in practice as a nationalist rather than a socialist exercise. The behaviour of the educated and business elite certainly indicates that racial, national, and vocational considerations were of major importance and that socialism was something to which only ritualistic obeisance was paid if any concern was expressed about it at all... talk about the Common Man was more often than not cynical in the extreme. Genuine socialists despaired of any chance of seeing socialism implemented in Uganda in their life-time... While the need for redistribution was repeatedly... the redistribution the UPC leadership was most concerned with was from the former metropolis to the new nation, from Asians to Africans, and only marginally from rich Africans to poor Africans.

— Selwyn D. Ryan, 1973

== Revocation ==
Obote's overthrow by the forces of Idi Amin in the military coup of January 1971 ended hopes of a full move toward socialism. The incoming Minister of Finance declared that the new regime would "break away from the trend towards absolute central control of the economy and adopt a more liberal economic policy". In his Kabale Pronouncement of 1 May 1971, a year to the day after Obote's Nakivubo Pronouncement, Amin confirmed this swing, and added that pure socialism and capitalism were only of academic interest to him; his aim was to choose elements of either which might be relevant to Uganda's needs. Except for four banks, four insurance companies, two locally owned sugar companies, and the East African Steel Corporation in which the government retained 49% of the shares, all other firms were left completely in private hands. The Move to the Left was clearly no longer a policy of the administration.
