= John Walugembe =

John Kakungulu Walugembe
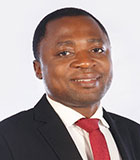
- Born: John Kakungulu Walugembe; 11 November 1981 (age 44); Ntinda, Kampala, Uganda
- Education: Harvard University; (MPA, Harvard Kennedy School); University of Oxford; (MBA, Saïd Business School); Makerere University; (Bachelor of Science); First-class honours
- Occupations: Entrepreneurship and Business Development Specialist
- Known for: Executive Director, FSME (Volunteer Since 2017); Executive Director, WASEU (Since 2015); Senior Green Growth Specialist, GGGI (since 2015); Executive Director, USSIA (2012 - 2016); Head Business Development, UNCCI (2004 – 2012); Judge, Pakasa Youth Awards 2016 (2016)
- Board member of: FYEU; Uganda WASH Alliance; Betterlivelihoods Inc; UCPC

John Kakungulu Walugembe (born 11 November 1981) is a Ugandan business executive, economist, author, entrepreneur and scientist. He is the founder of Oxford International Development Advisors Ltd (OXIDAL) and co-founder of the Oxford Green Partnership, Better Livelihoods Inc. and the Water and Sanitation Entrepreneurs Association Uganda (WASEU). He is the volunteer Executive Director of Federation of Small and Medium-sized Enterprises - Uganda (FSME), the former executive director of the Uganda Small Scale Industries Association (USSIA) and head of business development at the Uganda National Chamber of Commerce and Industry (UNCCI).

== Early life and education ==
He attended Busoga College Mwiri and King's College Budo for his secondary school education and then proceeded to Makerere University, where he attained a Bachelor of Science first-class honours degree in 2004. In 2016, he attended the University of Oxford in the United Kingdom, where he obtained a Master in Business Administration (MBA) majoring in Finance and Economics at Saïd Business School. At Oxford, he was a member of Wadham College and a recipient of the Skoll Scholarship for Social Entrepreneurship. He was also awarded an MPA (Development Economics and International Development) from Harvard University at Harvard Kennedy School.

Walugembe is a certified microfinance trainer with the World Bank Institute, a certified trainer with the International Labour Organization in Women Entrepreneurship Development (WED), a certified financial literacy trainer with GIZ/Bank of Uganda and has attended trainings by KOICA, JICA and UNDP.

== Career ==
Walugembe worked as the head of the consulting unit for the business development services department at the Uganda National Chamber of Commerce and Industry (UNCCI) from 2005 to 2012. In that spell, he promoted the establishment of the Turkey-Uganda Business Council, South Africa-Uganda Business Council and Iran-Uganda Business council. He was also the coordinator of the IGAD Business Forum (IBF) from 2009 to 2012. In 2012, he was appointed as the Executive Director of the Uganda Small Scale Industries Association (USSIA). He held this position till 2016. In 2017, he became the volunteer Executive Director of Federation of Small and Medium-sized Enterprises - Uganda (FSME).

Walugembe is a former chairperson of the policy, planning and research committee of Skilling Uganda where he also served as a member of the Executive Committee of the reform task force. He was the chairperson of the panel of judges for the Late Prof. James Mulwana Awards for Innovation and Entrepreneurship, a judge for the ICCO Agri-Business Innovation Challenge, and also one of the Judges for the Pakasa Youth Awards 2016.

He was a mentor for the African Entrepreneurship Award and a business mentor with TechnoServe, a ministerial nominee to the Industrial Training Council (ITC) of the Directorate of Industrial Training (DIT) Uganda and further served as the business development head of Water For People Uganda and the Rwenzori Urban Sanitation and Waste Programme (RUSWP) of the Netherlands government in Uganda. He was once a senior green growth specialist with the Global Green Growth Institute.

Walugembe also served on the boards of directors and/or executive or steering committees of: the Federation of Young Entrepreneurs Uganda (FYEU]); the Private Sector Foundation Uganda (PSFU); the CIPE-UMA Youth Entrepreneurship Initiative; the Konrad-Adenauer-Stiftung Uganda; the Ministry of Trade, Industry and Cooperatives (MTIC) and the Uganda WASH Alliance.

He is the founder of Cardiff International College of Business and Vocational Studies as well as Balcon Credit Limited, a rural microfinance company that gives loans to civil servants and rural women. Also, he is a member of the Rotary Club of Kampala and the former General Secretary of the KOICA Club of Uganda (KOCU).

== Further information ==
- "NBS Just asking - John Kakungulu Walugembe". July 2, 2014 – via YouTube.
- Walugembe, John (2013). "Interview with Mr. John Walugembe, Executive Director, USSIA" (Interview). Uganda CSR. Archived from the original on August 30, 2013.
- "Personal Finance: Importance of succession planning for small businesses". NTV Uganda. March 28, 2016 – via YouTube.
