= Mercy Kainobwisho =

Ugandan lawyer and corporate executive

- Born: Mercy Kainobwisho; 1979 (age 46–47); Uganda
- Education: Makerere University (Bachelor of Laws); University of Turin (Master of Laws); Law Development Centre (Diploma in Legal Practice); Makerere University Business School (Master of Business Administration)
- Occupations: Lawyer and Corporate Executive
- Years active: 1995 — present
- Known for: Professional expertise
- Title: Registrar general and executive director of the Uganda Registration Services Bureau

Mercy Kyomugasho Kainobwisho (born c.1979) is a Ugandan lawyer, business administrator and corporate executive, who serves as the registrar general and executive director of the Uganda Registration Services Bureau (URSB), effective December 2020. Prior to her current position, she served as the director of intellectual property at URSB.

== Background and education ==
Kainobwisho was born in Uganda circa 1979. She holds a Bachelor of Laws degree, obtained from the Makerere University, Uganda's largest and oldest public university. She went on to obtain a Diploma in Legal Practice from the Law Development Centre, in Kampala, Uganda's capital city. Her degree of Master of Laws was awarded by the University of Turin in Italy. She also holds a Master of Business Administration, obtained from Makerere University Business School.

== Career ==
In 2004, after admission to the Bar in Uganda, Kainobwisho joined Shonubi Musoke & Company Advocates, as a Legal Assistant, serving there for one year. She then transferred to the Uganda Ministry of Justice and Constitutional Affairs, as a State Attorney, working there for six years until October 2011.

In November 2011, she joined URSB as the Manager, Intellectual Property, serving in that capacity until June 2013. She was then promoted to Director, Business Registration, serving there until February 2017, when she became the Director, Intellectual Property at URSB.

In December 2020, following the election of Bemanya Twebaze as Director General of the African Regional Intellectual Property Organization (ARIPO), the Board of Directors of URSB conducted interviews for his replacement and Mercy Kainobwisho was selected as the best candidate. She assumed office on 22 December 2020.
