= Ministry of Internal Affairs (Uganda) =

Government ministry of Uganda

Coordinates: 00°19′08″N 32°35′49″E

- Coat of Arms of Uganda

Ministry overview
- Type: Ministry
- Jurisdiction: Government of Uganda
- Headquarters: Kampala, Uganda
- Ministry executive: Kahinda Otafiire, Minister of Internal Affairs
- Website: Homepage

The Ministry of Internal Affairs is a cabinet-level government ministry of Uganda. It is responsible for the facilitation of "legal and orderly movement of persons to and from Uganda, regulate the residence of immigrants in the country, verify and process Uganda citizenship and enforce national and regional immigration laws for the development and security of Uganda". The ministry is headed by a cabinet minister, currently General Kahinda Otafiire. He is assisted by a Minister of State, currently General David Muhoozi.

== Location ==
The headquarters of the ministry are located at 75 Jinja Road, in the Central Division of Kampala, the capital and largest city of Uganda. The coordinates of the ministry headquarters are: 0°19'08.0"N, 32°35'49.0"E (Latitude:0.318889; Longitude:32.596944).

== Organisational structure ==
The ministry is divided into three directorates and four departments:

- Directorate of Community Service
- Directorate of Government Analytical Laboratory
- Directorate of Citizenship and Immigration Control
- Bureau of Non-Governmental Organisations
- National Community Service Programme
- National Focal Point
- Department of Finance & Administration

== Affiliated government agencies ==
The ministry works closely with these government agencies and entities.

- Directorate of Citizenship and Immigration Control
- Uganda Police Force
- Uganda Prisons
- Justice Law and Order Sector
- National Identification and Registration Authority (NIRA)
- Uganda Investment Authority
- Uganda Tourism Board
- Makerere University

== See also ==
- List of ministers of internal affairs of Uganda
- Politics of Uganda
- Cabinet of Uganda
