= John Mikloth Magoola Luwuliza-Kirunda =

Ugandan politician

Minister of Internal Affairs of Uganda
- In office December 1980 – 1985
- President: Apollo Milton Obote
- Preceded by: Paulo Muwanga
- Succeeded by: Paul Ssemogerere

Minister of Labour of Uganda
- In office May 1980 – December 1980
- President: Paulo Muwanga, Presidential Commission of Uganda

Minister of Foreign Affairs of Uganda
- In office 1985–1985
- President: Apollo Milton Obote
- Preceded by: Apollo Milton Obote
- Succeeded by: Olara Otunnu

Organizing Secretary of the Uganda People's Congress
- In office 1966–1968
- President: Apollo Milton Obote
- In office May 1980 – December 1980
- President: Paulo Muwanga, Presidential Commission of Uganda

Personal details
- Born: 5 August 1940 Busembatia, Iganga District, Busoga sub-region, Eastern Region of Uganda
- Died: 8 August 2005 (aged 65) Zimbabwe
- Party: Uganda People's Congress, Uganda National Liberation Front
- Spouse: Margaret Marjorie Kaluma
- Children: One daughter, two sons
- Education: Makerere University University Teaching Hospital of the University of Birmingham, Royal Liverpool University Hospital
- Occupation: Physician, Surgeon, lecturer, politician, Ugandan Minister of Internal Affairs, Obstetrician, Gynecologist
- Profession: Physician, Surgeon, teacher, politician, Ugandan Minister of Internal Affairs, Obstetrician and Gynecologist at Mulago Hospital, Professor at Makerere University School of Medicine, University of Nairobi Medical School, University of Zambia School of Medicine, Minister of Labor of Uganda, Secretary of the Uganda People's Congress

John Mikloth Magoola Luwuliza-Kirunda (5 August 1940 – 8 August 2005) was a prominent Ugandan physician who served numerous roles in the Milton Obote governments, serving both as Minister of Internal Affairs of Uganda and Organizing Secretary of the Uganda People's Congress, serving in the latter role twice.

== Early life ==
John Mikloth Magoola Luwuliza-Kirunda was born on 5 August 1940 in Busembatia, Iganga District, Busoga sub-region, Eastern Region of Uganda. He was the nephew of powerful early Ugandan cabinet minister Shaban Nkuutu.

=== Education ===
Luwuliza-Kirunda attended Busoga College at Mwiri Hill, in the Jinja District of Uganda from 1948 to 1959. There he made numerous friends, many of whom would also become prominent Uganda People's Congress politicians. He then attended Makerere University in Kampala from 1960 to 1967, and then he interned at the University Teaching Hospital of Birmingham and the Royal Liverpool University Hospital in the United Kingdom from 1968 to 1971.

== Career ==
=== Medical career ===
Luwuliza-Kirunda was a prominent Ugandan physician and professor surrounding his medical career. He was certified as a gynecologist and an obstetrician by the Royal College of Obstetricians and Gynaecologists in London in 1978, passing the Membership Examination of the Royal College of Obstetricians and Gynaecologists (MRCOG). He began his career at Mulago Hospital in Kampala, Uganda, as a specialist obstetrician and a gynecologist, where he worked in 1971.

After a year practicing at Mulago Hospital, he entered medical teaching. He was a lecturer at Makerere Medical School from 1972 to 1974, then a senior lecturer there from 1974 to 1976, then an associate professor there from 1976 to 1977.

He continued his career as a medical professional abroad, teaching at both the University of Nairobi Medical School and the University of Zambia School of Medicine as a senior lecturer in 1978.

=== Political career ===
Despite his long career as a physician and professor of obstetrics and gynaecology, John Mikloth Magoola Luwuliza-Kirunda was one of the most powerful political figures in Apollo Milton Obote's second government, and was noted as a "boisterous" and "cocky" political figure in both Busoga and Uganda. He was a member of the Uganda People's Congress since 1960, and was organizing secretary of the Uganda People's Congress in 1966 for two years.

While working abroad as a senior lecturer in the fields of obstetrics and gynaecology, Luwuliza-Kirunda became involved with the Uganda National Liberation Front. Under Uganda National Liberation Front rule and the government of Paulo Muwanga and the Presidential Commission of Uganda, Luwuliza-Kirunda served as Minister of Labour from May 1980 until the 1980 Ugandan general election in December 1980. Also during the interim period, Luwuliza Kirunda served as Organizing Secretary of the Uganda People's Congress, leading to the 1980 elections when the Uganda People's Congress won 75 of the 126 seats.

Apollo Milton Obote became Head of State of Uganda again in 1980, where he appointed Luwuliza-Kirunda to be the powerful Minister of Internal Affairs of Uganda, where his portfolio included being Chief of the National Police of Uganda and the head of Special Force and Prisons. On 10 March 1981, he banned four newspapers including the Weekly Topic and the Citizen and detained the editors of these newspapers for publishing stories that highlighted Luwuliza Kirunda and other members of Obote's inner circle's wealth. He also imprisoned hundreds of people, including his own cousin John Kirunda for disrespecting a portrait of Apollo Milton Obote.

He also worked for education in Uganda, especially in the JIK region that made up the former Busoga kingdom (JIK stands for Jinja, Iganga, and Kamuli). He renovated schools like Busoga College, Wanyange Girls' School, and Kiira College Butiki, and built new secondary schools like Kisiki College, Nkuutu Memorial Secondary School, Bubinga Girls' School, and Nakabugu Girls' School.

In 1985, John Mikloth Magoola Luwuliza-Kirunda left the role of Minister of Internal Affairs and became Ministers of Foreign Affairs of Uganda briefly, before fleeing Uganda following the 1985 Ugandan coup d'état and moving to Kenya.

== Personal life ==
John Mikloth Magoola Luwuliza-Kirunda married Margaret Marjorie Kaluma in 1974. Together they had one son and two daughters. Luwuliza-Kirunda and his wife lived abroad following the 1985 Ugandan coup d'état, living in Nairobi, Kenya in the 1990s and in Zimbabwe in the 2000s.

== Death ==
On 8 August 2005, John Mikloth Magoola Luwuliza-Kirunda died in a rural hospital in Zimbabwe.

== See also ==
- Frank Nabwiso
- Politics of Uganda
