= Madoxx Ssemanda Sematimba =

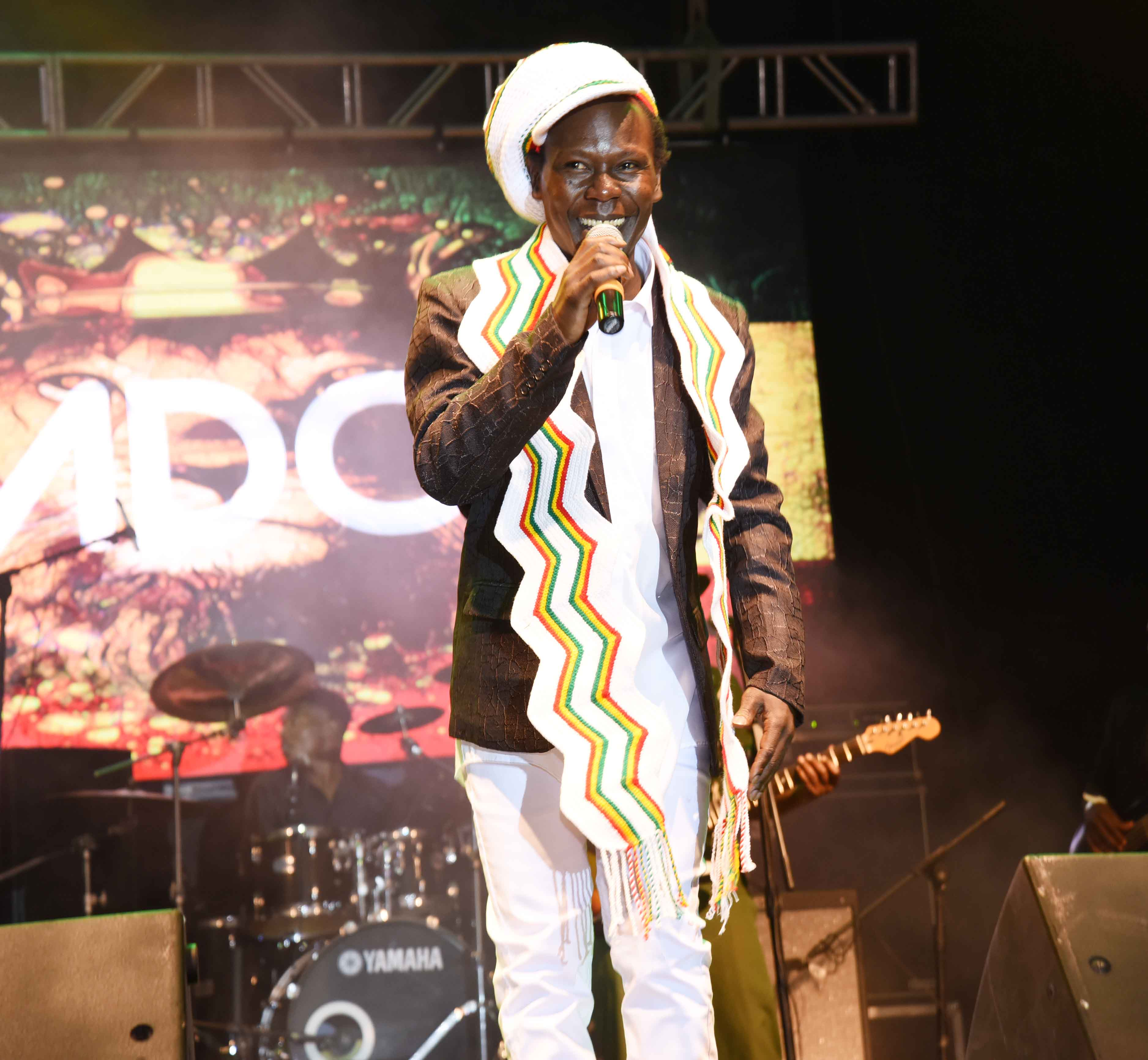
- Born: David Ssemanda Ssematimba; 1972 (age 53–54); Kampala, Uganda
- Occupation: Musician
- Years active: 2000
- Known for: Reggae Artist Legend
- Style: Reggae
- Children: Christopher Ssemanda, Melody Ssemanda
- Awards: PAM AWARD 2007

David Amon Ssemanda Ssematimba (born 1972) known by his stage name, Madoxx Ssemanda Sematimba is a Ugandan roots reggae musician. He is notable in Uganda for his reggae ballads in Luganda, lives in Kampala, Uganda

== Early life and education ==
Ssematimba was born in Kampala in 1972. He attended Makonzi Boarding Primary School and Busoga College Mwiri. Before choosing a path in music, Ssematimba worked as a primary school teacher. He relocated to Stockholm, Sweden in 1991, when he was 21 years old. While performing in night-clubs to pay for his computer studies, he met Kenneth "Mafo" Ssejjemba Magoye, a fellow musician, who introduced him to Aggrey Ssembatya, the proprietor of Small Axe Productions. He moved to Gothenburg where he eventually began working on his albums at Small Axe Studios. He wrote, composed, arranged, programmed, performed, co-mixed and produced all the songs on the albums while Aggrey engineered and co-mixed the albums.

== Music career ==
Madoxx Sematimba is a reggae musician who sings in Luganda. Released in 2000, Madoxx's first album named Tukolagane included the singles "Namagembe", "Tukolagane", "Omukwano Gwafe", "Munakyalo", and "Eddembe" . He followed it up in 2006 with the album Abato, with singles like "Nakatudde", "Leka Nkulage", "Easy" and "Wansonyi". Influenced by Gregory Isaacs and Israel Vibration to name but a few. He continued to perform until 2009 when he returned to Uganda, but had reportedly left the music business a year later. Since 2014 Maddox has been performing locally in Uganda. He has two children.

== Discography ==
- Tukolagane, 2001
- Abato, 2006
