= History of Uganda (1963–1971) =

Sovereign State of Uganda (1963–1967) Republic of Uganda (1967–1971) Jamhuri ya Uganda
- 1962–1971
- Flag Coat of arms
- Motto: "For God and My Country"
- Anthem: "Oh Uganda, Land of Beauty"
- Capital: Kampala
- Common languages: English and Swahili
- Religion: Christianity and Islam
- Demonym: Ugandan
- Membership: Until 1967: Buganda; Bunyoro; Busoga; Rwenzururu; Tooro Kingdom; Ankole; Chiefdom of Bunya; Kooki
- Government: Federal parliamentary elective constitutional monarchy (1963–1966) Unitary one-party (Note: after 1969) presidential socialist republic under a dictatorship (1966–1971)
- President
  - 1963–1966: Edward Mutesa II
  - 1966–1971: Milton Obote
- Vice President
  - 1963–1966: William Wilberforce Kadhumbla Nadhope III
  - 1966–1971: John Babiiha
- Prime Minister
  - 1963–1966: Milton Obote
- Legislature: Parliament
- Historical era: Cold War
  - Established: 9 October 1962
  - Mengo Crisis: 24 February 1966
  - 1966 Constitution: 8 September 1967
  - Coup d'état: 25 January 1971

Population
  - 1969: 9,548,847
- Currency: East African shilling (1963–1966); Ugandan shilling (1966–1971)
- ISO 3166 code: UG
Preceded by
Dominion of Uganda
Buganda
Bunyoro
Busoga
Rwenzururu
Tooro Kingdom
Ankole
Chiefdom of Bunya
Kooki
Succeeded by
Second Republic of Uganda
- Today part of: Uganda

The history of Uganda from 1963 through 1971 comprises the history of Uganda from Ugandan independence from the United Kingdom to the rise of the dictator Idi Amin.

The Ugandan state was officially named the Sovereign State of Uganda between 1963 and 1967, before becoming the Republic of Uganda upon the enactment of the 1967 constitution which ended the previous system of a elective monarchy wherein the President was elected by parliament from among the 5 subnational monarchs.

Early independent Uganda during this period was dominated by the regime of Milton Obote, Uganda's first Prime Minister and subsequently President, who after being deposed by Amin returned to power in the 1980s.

== Move to independence ==
Uganda's approach to independence was unlike that of most other colonial territories where political parties had been organized to force self-rule or independence from a reluctant colonial government. In Uganda there had been some demands for greater autonomy, but these were mostly expressed by local nationalisms surrounding the five constituent kingdoms of the colony. One exception was the long-lived Uganda National Congress, based on the Congress Party of India.

Uganda was greatly divided along national, religious, and ethnic lines. The national divisions were the most apparent. The country was dominated by Buganda, much to the annoyance of the other four kingdoms. The kingdom of Bunyoro felt especially aggrieved having been deprived of its "lost counties" when Uganda became a British protectorate.

Deep religious divisions had developed. The British-linked and British-supported elite had largely converted to Protestantism. The majority of the population were Catholic and they were excluded from power by the Protestants. Uganda also had a significant Muslim population that were excluded from power as well. Ethnic divisions were just as important. Under the British, Uganda's economic activity was mostly undertaken by a large group of Indian immigrants who operated many of the businesses and constituted the majority of the colony's merchants. Moreover, there was a long-standing divide between the Nilotics of the north and the Bantu of the south of the country.

Upon independence three parties developed. The Democratic Party (DP), modelled on Germany's Christian Democrats, represented the Catholic population. The Uganda People's Congress (UPC) was supported mainly by groups from the north and western parts. The Kabaka Yekka (KY) (meaning "king only") was a Bugandan nationalist party. In the pre-independence period the Democratic Party, surprisingly, won the most seats, but not a majority. In the elections of 1962, in preparation for Independence, the UPC and KY united and excluded the DP. Milton Obote, the leader of the Uganda People's Congress, became the nation's first Prime Minister.

== UPC-KY coalition rule (1962–1964) ==
The Uganda People's Congress had several obstacles to forming a government. The party leadership was fragmented. Each party functionary represented a local constituency, and most of the constituencies were ethnically distinct. For example, Milton Obote's strength lay among his Langi kin in northern Uganda; George Magezi represented the local interests of his Bunyoro compatriots; Grace S.K. Ibingira's strength was in the Ankole; and Felix Onama was the northern leader of the largely neglected West Nile District in the north-west corner of Uganda. Each of these regional political bosses and those from the other Uganda regions expected to receive a ministerial post in the new Uganda government, to exercise patronage, and to bring the material fruits of independence to local supporters. Failing these objectives, each was likely either to withdraw from the UPC coalition or realign within it.

The UPC had had no effective urban organization before independence, although it was able to mobilize the trade unions, most of which were led by non-Ugandan immigrant workers from Kenya (a situation which contributed to the independent Uganda government's almost immediate hostility toward the trade unions). No common ideology united the UPC, the composition of which ranged from the near reactionary Onama to the radical John Kakonge, leader of the UPC Youth League. As prime minister, Obote was responsible for keeping this loose coalition of divergent interest groups intact.

Obote also faced the task of maintaining the UPC's external alliances, primarily the coalition between the UPC and the kabaka, who led Buganda's KY. Obote proved adept at meeting the diverse demands of his many partners in government. He even temporarily acceded to some demands which he found repugnant, such as Buganda's claim for special treatment. This accession led to demands by other kingdoms for similar recognition. The Busoga chiefdoms banded together to claim that they, too, deserved recognition under the rule of their newly defined monarch, the kyabasinga. Not to be outdone, the Iteso people, who had never recognized a precolonial king, claimed the title kingoo for Teso District's political boss, Cuthbert Joseph Obwangor. Despite these separatist pressures, Obote's long-term goal was to build a strong central government at the expense of entrenched local interests, especially those of Buganda.

The first major challenge to the Obote government came not from the kingdoms, nor the regional interests, but from the military. In January 1964, units of the Ugandan Army mutinied, demanding higher pay and more rapid promotions. Minister of Defense Onama, who courageously went to speak to the mutineers, was seized and held hostage. Obote was forced to call in British troops to restore order, a humiliating blow to the new regime. In the aftermath, Obote's government acceded to all the mutineers' demands, unlike the governments of Kenya and Tanganyika, which responded to similar demands with increased discipline and tighter control over their small military forces.

The military then began to assume a more prominent role in Ugandan life. Obote selected a popular junior officer with minimal education, Idi Amin Dada, and promoted him rapidly through the ranks as a personal protégé. As the army expanded, it became a source of political patronage and of potential political power.

== Breakup of the coalition (1964) ==
Later in 1964, Obote felt strong enough to address the critical issue of the "lost counties" which the British had postponed until after independence. The combination of patronage offers and the promise of future rewards within the ruling coalition gradually thinned opposition party ranks, as members of parliament crossed the floor to join the government benches. After two years of independence, Obote finally acquired enough votes to give the UPC a majority and free himself of the KY coalition. The turning point came when several DP members of parliament from Bunyoro agreed to join the government side if Obote would undertake a popular referendum to restore the "lost counties" to Bunyoro. The kabaka, naturally, opposed the plebiscite. Unable to prevent it, he sent 300 armed Baganda veterans to the area to intimidate Banyoro voters. In turn, 2,000 veterans from Bunyoro massed on the frontier. Civil war was averted, and the referendum was held. The vote demonstrated an overwhelming desire by residents in the counties annexed to Buganda in 1900 to be restored to their historic Bunyoro allegiance, which was duly enacted by the new UPC majority despite KY opposition.

This triumph for Obote and the UPC strengthened the central government and threw Buganda into disarray. KY unity was weakened by internal recriminations, after which some KY stalwarts, too, began to "cross the floor" to join Obote's victorious government. By early 1966, the result was a parliament composed of seventy-four UPC, nine DP, eight KY, and one independent MP. The Obote regime was to become associated with food shortage, corruption, and the terrorizing, harassing, and torturing of Ugandans, particularly Indian traders.

== UPC multi-party rule (1964–1966) ==
As the perceived threat from Buganda diminished, many non-Baganda alliances weakened. And as the possibility of an opposition DP victory faded, the UPC coalition itself began to come apart. The one-party state did not signal the end of political conflict; it merely relocated and intensified that conflict within the party. The issue that brought the UPC disharmony to a crisis involved Obote's military protégé, Idi Amin.

In 1966 Amin caused a commotion when he walked into a Kampala bank with a gold bar (bearing the stamp of the government of the Belgian Congo) and asked the bank manager to exchange it for cash. Amin's account was ultimately credited with a deposit of £17,000. Obote rivals questioned the incident, and it emerged that the prime minister and a handful of close associates had used Colonel Amin and units of the Uganda Army to intervene in the neighbouring Congo Crisis. Former supporters of Congolese leader Patrice Lumumba, led by a "General Olenga," opposed the American-backed government and were attempting to lead the Eastern Province into secession. These troops were reported to be trading looted ivory and gold for arms supplies secretly smuggled to them by Amin. The arrangement became public when Olenga later claimed that he failed to receive the promised munitions. This claim appeared to be supported by the fact that in mid-1965, a seventy-five-ton shipment of Chinese weapons was intercepted by the Kenyan government as it was being moved from Tanzania to Uganda.

Obote's rivals for leadership within the UPC, supported by some Baganda politicians and others who were hostile to Obote, used the evidence revealed by Amin's casual bank deposit to claim that the prime minister and his closest associates were corrupt and had conducted secret foreign policy for personal gain, in the amount of £25,000 each. Obote denied the charge and said the money had been spent to buy the munitions for Olenga's Congolese troops. On 4 February 1966, while Obote was away on a trip to the north of the country, an effective "no confidence" vote against Obote was passed by the UPC Mps. This attempt to remove Obote appeared to be organized by UPC Secretary General Grace S.K. Ibingira, closely supported by the UPC leader from Bunyoro, George Magezi, and a number of other southern UPC notables. Only the radical UPC member, John Kakonge, voted against the motion.

Because he was faced with a nearly unanimous disavowal by his governing party and national parliament, many people expected Obote to resign. Instead, Obote turned to Idi Amin and the army, and, in effect, carried out a coup d'état against his own government in order to stay in power. Obote suspended the constitution, arrested the offending UPC ministers, and assumed control of the state. He forced a new constitution through parliament without a reading and without the necessary quorum. That constitution abolished the federal powers of the kingdoms, most notably the internal autonomy enjoyed by Buganda, and concentrated presidential powers in the prime minister's office. The kabaka objected, and Buganda prepared to wage a legal battle. Baganda leaders rhetorically demanded that Obote's "illegal" government remove itself from Buganda soil.

Buganda, however, once again miscalculated, for Obote was not interested in negotiating. Instead, he sent Idi Amin and loyal troops to attack the kabaka's palace on nearby Mengo Hill. The palace was defended by a small group of bodyguards armed with rifles and shotguns. Amin's troops had heavy weapons but were reluctant to press the attack until Obote became impatient and demanded results. By the time the Battle of Mengo Hill resulted in the palace being overrun, the kabaka had taken advantage of a cloudburst to exit over the rear wall. He hailed a passing taxi and was driven off to exile. After the assault, Obote was reasonably secure from open opposition. The new republican 1967 constitution abolished the kingdoms altogether. Buganda was divided into four districts and ruled through martial law, a forerunner of the military domination over the civilian population that all of Uganda would experience after 1971.

== UPC one-party rule (1966–1971) ==
Obote's success in the face of adversity reclaimed for him the support of most members of the UPC, which then became the only legal political party. The original independence election of 1962, therefore, was the last one held in Uganda until December 1980. On the home front, Obote issued the "Common Man's Charter," echoed the call for African socialism by Tanzanian President Julius Nyerere, and proclaimed a "move to the left" to signal new efforts to consolidate power. His critics noted that he placed most control over economic nationalization in the hands of an Asian millionaire who was also a financial backer of the UPC. Obote created a system of secret police, the General Service Unit (GSU). Headed by a relative, Akena Adoko, the GSU reported on suspected subversives. The Special Force Units of paramilitary police, heavily recruited from Obote's own region and ethnic group, supplemented the security forces within the army and police.

Although Buganda had been defeated and occupied by the military, Obote was still concerned about security there. His concerns were well founded; in December 1969 he was wounded in an assassination attempt and narrowly escaped more serious injury when a grenade thrown near him failed to explode. He had retained power by relying on Idi Amin and the army, but it was not clear that he could continue to count on their loyalty.

== Rivalry with Idi Amin ==
Obote appeared particularly uncertain of the army after Amin's sole rival among senior army officers, Brigadier Acap Okoya, was murdered early in 1970. (Amin later promoted the man rumored to have recruited Okoya's killers.) A second attempt was made on Obote's life when his motorcade was ambushed later that year, but the vice-president's car was mistakenly riddled with bullets. Obote began to recruit more Acholi and Langi troops, and he accelerated their promotions to counter the large numbers of soldiers from Amin's home, which was then known as West Nile District. Obote also enlarged the paramilitary Special Force as a counterweight to the army.

Amin, who at times inspected his troops wearing an outsized sport shirt with Obote's face across the front and back, protested his loyalty. But in October 1970, Amin was placed under temporary house arrest while investigators looked into his army expenditures, reportedly several million dollars over budget. Another charge against Amin was that he had continued to aid southern Sudan's Anyanya rebels in opposing the regime of Gaafar Nimeiry even after Obote had shifted his support away from the Anyanya to Nimeiry. This foreign policy shift provoked an outcry from Israel, which had been supplying the Anyanya rebels. Amin was close friends with several Israeli military advisers who were in Uganda to help train the Ugandan Army, and their eventual role in Amin's efforts to oust Obote remained the subject of continuing controversy.

== See also ==
- Uganda Army (1962–1971)

== Sources ==
- - Uganda
