= Sam Odaka =

Ugandan politician and diplomat (1929–2015)

Foreign Minister of Uganda
- In office 1964 – 25 January 1971
- President: Edward Mutesa; Milton Obote
- Succeeded by: Joshua Wanume Kibedi

Personal details
- Born: 30 January 1929 Bukedi, Uganda
- Died: 4 August 2015 (aged 86) Kampala, Uganda
- Party: Uganda People's Congress
- Spouse: Margaret Namwanje Kavuma Odaka

Samuel Ngude Odaka (30 January 1929 – 4 August 2015) was a Ugandan diplomat, politician and member of the Uganda People's Congress political party. He served as the Foreign Minister of Uganda from 1964 to 1971 during the first tenure of President Milton Obote. He later became the Minister of Planning and Economic Development during the second Obote administration (1980–1985).

A member of the Samia people, Odaka was born in 1929. Odaka, who was from the Busia District of eastern Uganda, married Margaret Namwanje Kavuma Odaka, a member of the Baganda ethnic group.

Odaka left a career at Esso, the oil company, to enter politics. Odaka served as the Foreign Minister of Uganda from 1964 to 1971 under the first tenure of President Milton Obote. Odaka had previously represented Uganda at the 1963 negotiations in Addis Ababa which established the Organisation of African Unity (OAU), now called the African Union.

A member of Obote's Uganda People's Congress (UPC), Odaka, who was seen as a more liberal politician than Obote, was also a negotiator for Obote's regime. Sam Odaka was credited with aiding Uganda's first President, Edward Mutesa, who was forced from office by Obote in 1966. Mutesa, also known as Mutesa II of Buganda, went into exile in the United Kingdom. Odaka, in a compromise, offered to send Kabaka's assets to him in the United Kingdom, with the stipulation that Kabaka recognize the new Obote regime.

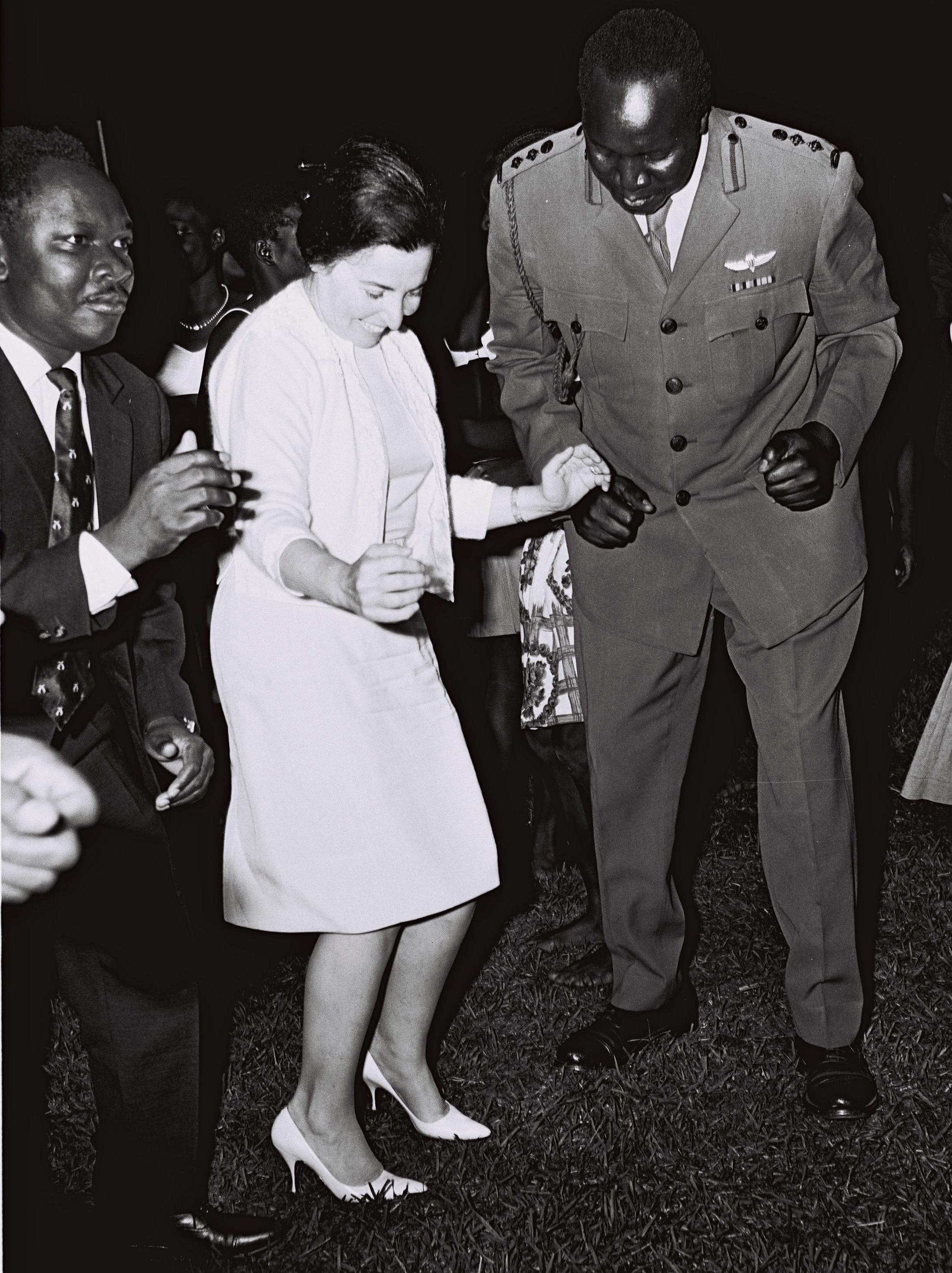
Odaka (left) with Miriam Eshkol and Idi Amin, 1966

President Obote and the Uganda People's Congress (UPC) announced their intention to "Move to the Left" during the late 1960s and early 1970s. The announcement, issued in the Common Man's Charter, alarmed business interests in Uganda, which feared a socialist-leaning economic policies. Foreign Minister Odaka was tasked by Obote's government with the leading the public relations to support the Move to the Left.

However, the Move to the Left was fully implemented. President Milton Obote was overthrown by Idi Amin in the 1971 Ugandan coup d'état on 25 January 1971, ending the first Obote regime and the "Move to the Left" policies. Sam Odaka fled into exile following the coup.

Milton Obote regained power in 1980 following the 1980 general election, beginning the Obote II administration. Sam Odaka became Uganda's Minister of Planning and Economic Development during Obote's second tenure (1980–1985).

Sam Odaka died from kidney failure at International Hospital Kampala on 4 August 2015, at the age of 86. He was survived by his wife, Margaret Namwanje Kavuma Odaka, four daughters, and five grandchildren. A vigil was held at his home in the Mbuya neighborhood of Kampala. Odaka's funeral was held at Kampala's All Saints Cathedral. He was buried in Busia District on 8 August 2015.
