= Frank Nabwiso =

Ugandan educator and politician (1960–2024)

- Born: 1 January 1940; Bugembe Maternity Centre, British Uganda
- Died: 14 December 2024 (aged 84); Mukono, Uganda
- Education: Kyambogo University; Makerere University; University of Sussex; University of Wisconsin
- Occupations: Educator and Politician
- Years active: 1962–2013
- Known for: Politics

Frank Nabwiso (1 January 1940 – 14 December 2024) was a Ugandan educator and politician who served as the Member of Parliament, representing Kagoma County Constituency in Jinja District, from 2001 until 2006. In 2006 he stood for re-election but was unsuccessful. In 2021, Nabwiso contested the position of Mayor of Jinja City where he lost to Peter Kasolo Okotcha of the National Resistance Movement political party. In all three elections, he stood on the opposition Forum for Democratic Change political party ticket.

== Early life and education ==
Nabwiso was born circa 1940, in the Busoga sub-region, in the Eastern Region of Uganda. He attended St James Senior Secondary School. He proceeded to Kamuli Junior Secondary School and later Busoga College Mwiri.

He graduated with a Grade III Teaching Certificate from National Teachers College Kyambogo (now Kyambogo University). He then transferred to Makerere University, where he obtained a Bachelor of Arts degree in History and Political Science in 1967.

In 1968, he traveled to the United Kingdom on scholarship to pursue a Master's degree in African Development Studies at the University of Sussex. While there, he met other African scholars, including Thabo Mbeki, who later became President of South Africa, Mokgweetsi Masisi, who later became President of Botswana and George Saitoti, who later served as Vice President of Kenya. He was awarded a Doctor of Philosophy degree in Adult Education and Rural Development by the University of Wisconsin in 1976.

== Career before politics ==
He taught at Kaliro Junior Secondary School, in Kaliro and at Bishop Willis Teachers Training College in Iganga, before joining Radio Uganda as a news anchor in the Lusoga language in 1962. In 1969, he became the resident tutor at Makerere University's Centre for Continuing Education, for Busoga and East Mengo sub-regions, succeeding Apollo Nsibambi. In addition, Nabwiso taught Development Studies to Army Officers at Gadhafi Barracks in Jinja, Uganda, from 1969 until 1970.

From 1976 until 1981 he worked as the Regional International Officer for Planned Parenthood Federation, based in Nairobi, Kenya.

== Political career ==
In 1984 he joined the NRM and became secretary of their external wing. The next year he was the Secretary of the peace talks between the NRM led by Yoweri Museveni and the government of Uganda led by Tito Okello Lutwa. In 1987, he was appointed executive director of the Uganda Export Promotion Council, serving there for five years. He then served as the Director of the AIDS Information Centre for three years. In 2001, Nabwiso was elected Member of Parliament for Kagoma County, serving a single term. In 2008 he was appointed Secretary of the Inter-Party Cooperation, an alliance of key political parties including UPC, FDC, DP, CP, and JEEMA.

== Personal life and death ==
The last several weeks of Nabwiso's life were spent at the Mukono Church of Uganda Hospital in Mukono, Mukono District, in the Central Region of Uganda. He died there on 14 December 2024, at the age of 84. He was buried at Mutai Village, in Buwenge Rural Sub-county, Jinja District, on 21 December.

== See also ==
- John Mikloth Magoola Luwuliza-Kirunda
- Politics of Uganda
