= Ernest Kiiza =

Ugandan politician (born 1967)

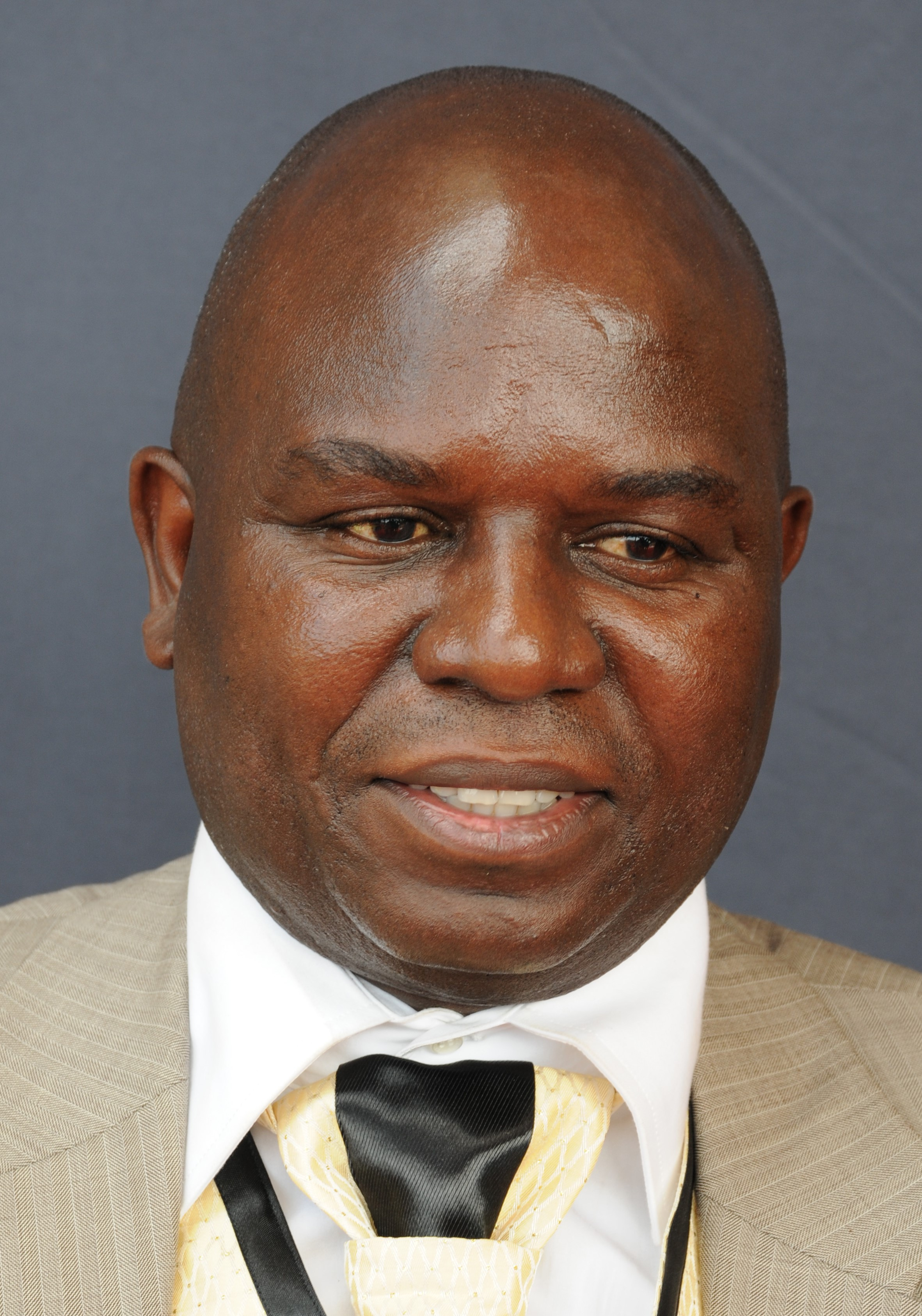
- Born: 23 June 1967 (age 59); Uganda
- Citizenship: Uganda
- Education: Makerere University (Bachelor of Science in Forestry
- Occupations: Forester & Politician
- Years active: 1994 — present
- Known for: Politics
- Title: State Minister for Bunyoro Affairs

Ernest Apuuli Monday Kiiza is a Ugandan politician. He is the current State Minister for Bunyoro Affairs in the Office of the Prime Minister in the Ugandan Cabinet. He was appointed to that position on 15 August 2012. In the cabinet reshuffle of 1 March 2015, he retained his cabinet post. He is also the elected Member of Parliament for Masindi Municipality.

== Background and education ==
He was born in Masindi District on 23 June 1967. He attended St. Mary's College Kisubi for his O-Level education, graduating in 1994. For his A-Level studies, he attended Busoga College, graduating in 1987. He studied forestry at Makerere University, graduating in 1992, with the degree of Bachelor of Science in Forestry.

== Career ==
Beginning in 1994, he is the managing director of Ernest Publishers Limited, a family owned business in Masindi. Since 1998, he serves as the chairman of the Bunyoro Development Foundation. From 2002 until 2004, he served as the Speaker of Bunyoro Kitara Kingdom. He also has served as the managing director of Bunyoro Broadcasting Service, a radio station in Masindi, since 2001. Since 2010, he serves as the Chairman of the National Resistance Movement in Masindi Municipality. He also serves as the Chairman of Masindi Kitara Diocese Pillars Association, since 2011. In 2011, he successfully contested for the parliamentary seat of Masindi Municipality in the 9th Ugandan Parliament, running on the National Resistance Movement political party ticket. He won and is the incumbent Member of Parliament. On 15 August 2012, he was appointed State Minister for Bunyoro Affairs, in the Office of the Prime Minister.

== Personal life ==
Ernest Kiiza is married. He is of the Protestant faith. He belongs to the National Resistance Movement political party.

== See also ==
- Cabinet of Uganda
- Parliament of Uganda
- Masindi District
- Government of Uganda
