= Busoga College =

Coordinates: 00°29′55″N 33°15′48″E

Busoga College Mwiri, Mwiri
- Mwiri Hill, Jinja District; Uganda

Information
- Type: Public Middle School and High School
- Motto: "Kulwa Katonda n'Eggwanga Lyaffe" meaning "For God and Our Country"
- Established: 25 September 1911
- Headteacher: Peter Sibukule
- Athletics: Football, basketball, Cricket, Track, Rugby, Volleyball, Lawn Tennis, Table Tennis, Hockey, Morabaraba
- Website: Homepage

Busoga College Mwiri, is a boarding secondary school located in the eastern region of Uganda, specifically Jinja.

== Location ==
Busoga College Mwiri is located on Mwiri Hill in Wairaka Parish, Kakira Town Council-Jinja District, Eastern Region of Uganda, adjacent and to the immediate west of the town of Kakira. Mwiri is approximately 14.6 kilometres (9 mi) by road, north-east of Jinja, the second largest city in the Uganda. The coordinates of Busoga College are 0°29'55.0"N, 33°15'48.0"E (Latitude0.498611; Longitude:33.263333).

== Overview ==
The all-boys boarding school was founded by the Church Missionary Society, who later turned it over to the Church of Uganda. The school receives funding from Uganda's Ministry of Education, thus meeting the classification as a public school. It is one of the prominent middle and high schools (Senior Secondary Schools), in Uganda. The country's first Prime Minister, the late Milton Obote, attended Busoga College Mwiri.

== History ==
Busoga College Mwiri was founded on 25 September 1911, as Balangira High School, to educate the sons of Busoga Chiefs. Initially, the school was housed in Kamuli. Between 1920 and 1930, plans were made to move the school to Mwiri Hill because of more space and newer, better infrastructure. The school also opened to sons of non-chiefs. Between 1930 and 1933, the school temporarily relocated to Kings College Budo in Wakiso District because of the poor accommodations at Kamuli. In 1933, the school permanently relocated to its present premises at Mwiri Hill. In 1967, a proposal was made to merge Busoga College Mwiri with nearby Wanyange Girls School. The following year, however, the Mwiri Old Boys Association rejected the proposal and the idea was abandoned.

== Prominent alumni ==
The prominent men who have attended Busoga College Mwiri include the following:

- Milton Obote: The first prime minister of Uganda (1962 to 1966). President of Uganda (1966 to 1971) and (1980 to 1985). Deposed twice from power via coup d'état, by Idi Amin in 1971 and by Tito Okello in 1985.
- George Kirya: Physician, academic, microbiologist, politician, and diplomat. Professor of microbiology at Makerere University Medical School from 1978 until 1986. Was vice chancellor of Makerere University from 1986 until 1990. Was Uganda's high commissioner to the United Kingdom from 1997 to 2003. Chairman of the Uganda Health Services Commission from 2005 until 2012.
- Ruhakana Rugunda: Physician, politician, and diplomat. Prime minister of Uganda from 2014 to 2021. Was minister of health in Uganda from May 2013 until September 2014. Minister of information communication technology from 2011 until 2003. Uganda's permanent representative at the United Nations from January 2009 until May 2011.
- William Gabula Nadiope IV: The reigning Kyabazinga of Busoga.
- Daniel Kalinaki: Journalist
- Joshua Wanume Kibedi: Lawyer, politician and diplomat, who served as the Foreign Minister between January 1971 and January 1973
- Ernest Kiiza: Politician
- Kirunda Kivejinja: Zoologist and politician. Second deputy prime minister and minister of east African community affairs since 6 June 2016.
- Nandala Mafabi: Accountant, lawyer, and politician
- Philemon Mateke: Politician
- Andrew Mwenda: Journalist and community activist. He is the owner and editor of The Independent (Uganda), a weekly Ugandan newsmagazine.
- James Mutende: Ugandan veterinarian, economist, academic, and politician. He was the state minister of industry in the Ugandan cabinet from 27 May 2011 until his death.
- Barnabas Nawangwe: Architect, academic and current vice chancellor of Makerere University
- Henry Osinde: Cricketer
- Francis Ayume: Former attorney general of Uganda and one time speaker of the Parliament of Uganda.
- Madoxx Ssemanda Sematimba: Ugandan roots reggae musician
- John Walugembe: Business executive, economist, author, entrepreneur and scientist
- Wilber Kakaire: Youth social worker, activist and champion of Sustainable Development Goals in Uganda. He was the only youth delegate from Uganda at the launch of Global Goals at the UNGA in 2015
- John Mikloth Magoola Luwuliza-Kirunda: Physician and Ugandan political figure, serving as the secretary general of the Uganda People's Congress and as the minister of internal affairs and foreign affairs
- Ernest Obitre Gama: Lieutenant colonel in the Uganda People's Defence Force and the minister of internal affairs under Idi Amin
- James Mbuzi Nyonyintono Zikusoka: Civil engineer, who served as the cabinet minister of works and transport from 1971 until 1972
- George Kanyeihamba: Author, Politician and Judge.
