= Kampala Airport =

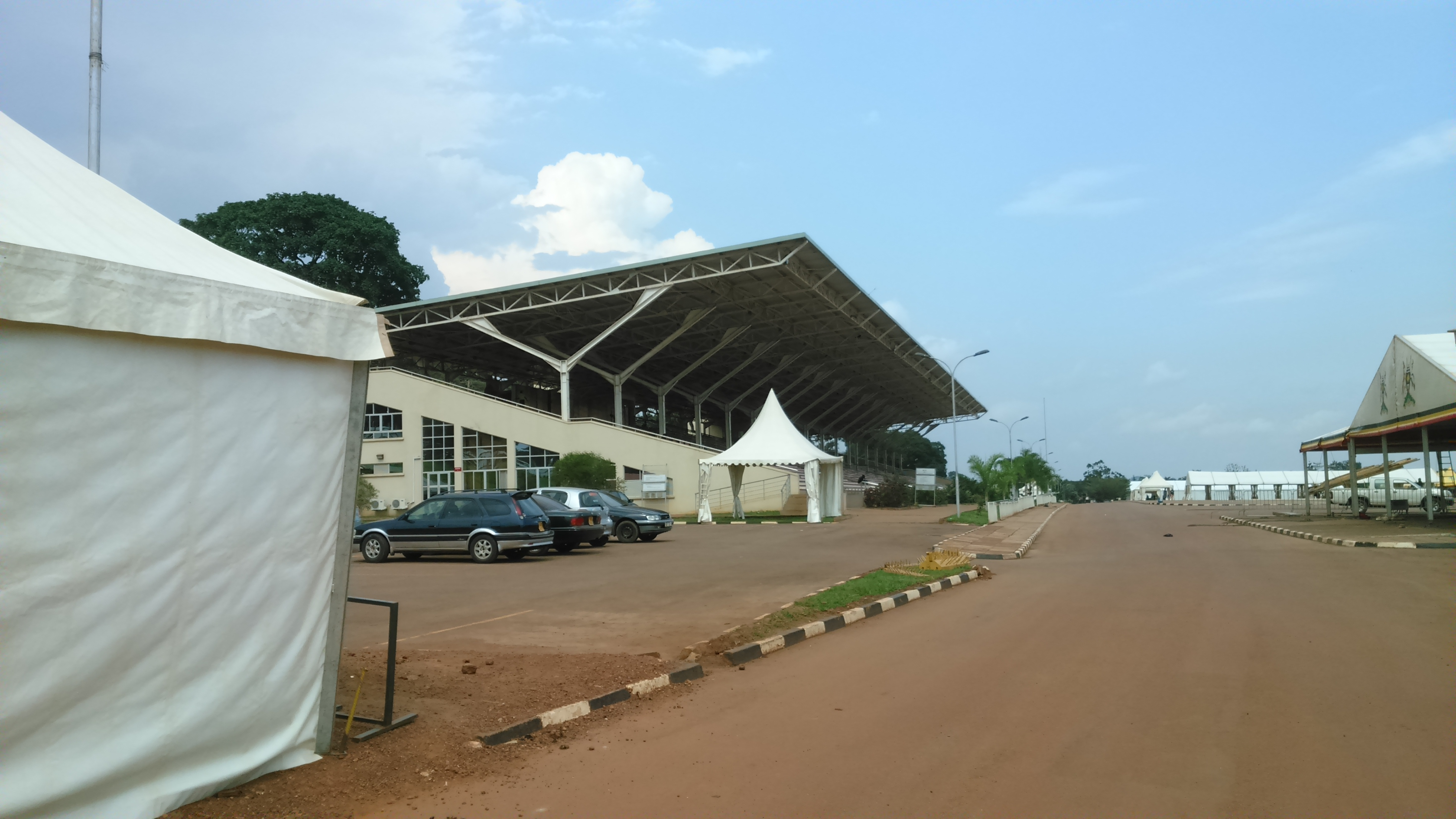
- IATA: none; ICAO: HUKC

Summary
- Airport type: Civilian and Military
- Owner: Civil Aviation Authority of Uganda
- Serves: Kampala, Uganda
- Location: Kampala, Uganda
- Elevation AMSL: 3,930 ft / 1,197 m
- Coordinates: 00°19′35″N 032°35′36″E

Map
- Location of Kololo Airstrip In Uganda

Runways
Direction	Length		Surface
Direction	ft	m	Surface
			Unpaved

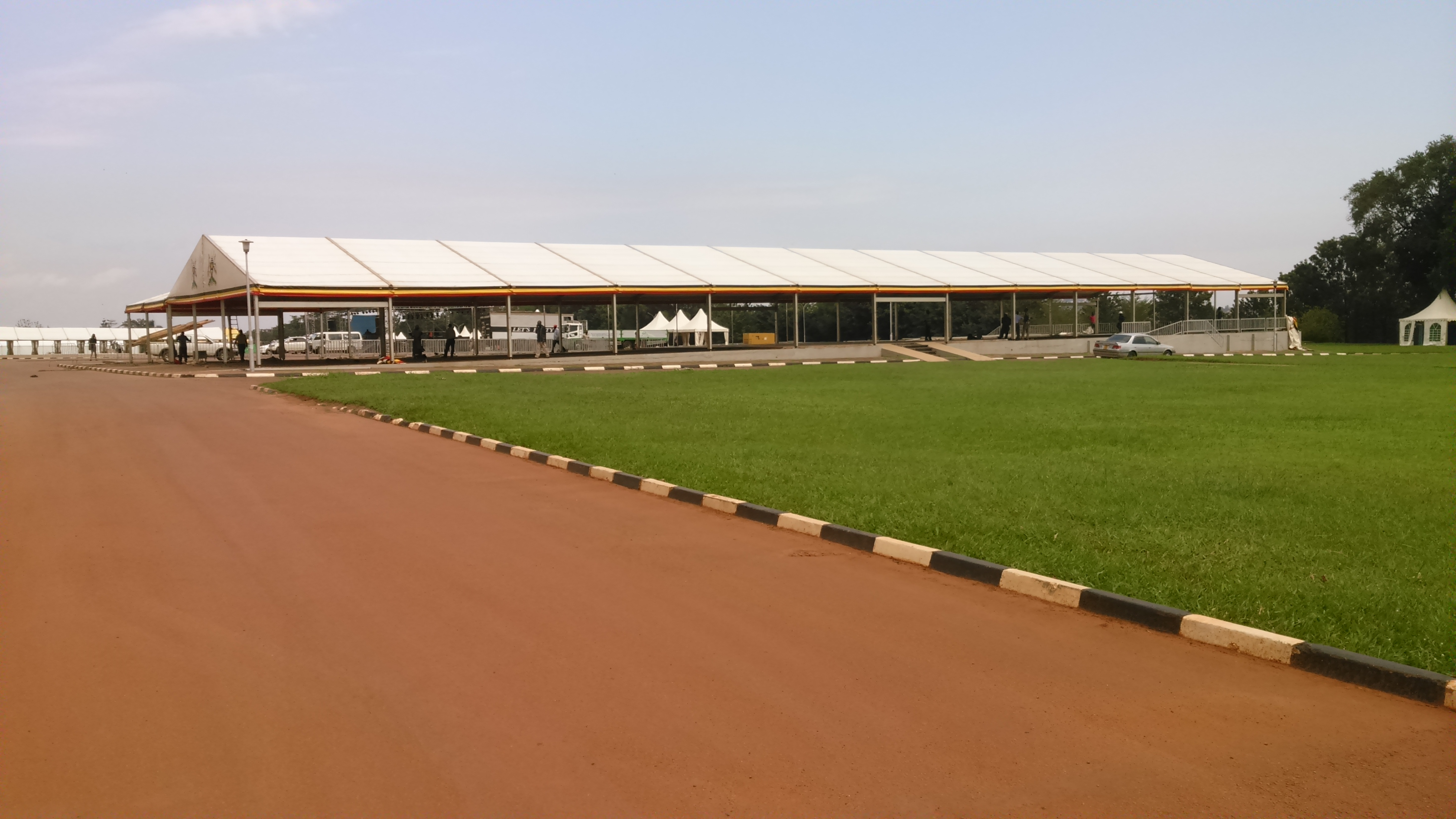
Kampala Airport

Kampala Airport, commonly known as Kololo Airstrip and officially as Kololo Ceremonial Grounds, (IATA: n/a, ICAO: HUKC) was an airport in Uganda. It was one of the forty-seven airports in the country.

== Location ==
Kampala Airport was located on the south-facing slope of Kololo Hill in the centre of Kampala, Uganda's capital and largest city. Its location is about 35 kilometres (22 mi), by air, north of Entebbe International Airport, Uganda's largest airport. The airport had a single gravel runway of 1000 x 60 yd (914 x 55 mt). The main campus of Kampala International University is about 35 minutes from the Kampala Airport.

== Overview ==
Kampala Airport was a small civilian and military, city airport, that served the city of Kampala. The airport now serves as Independence Park and has no scheduled airline service. The airport is not administered by the Uganda Civil Aviation Authority.

== History ==
Kololo Airstrip was constructed during 1936 at the instigation of Philip Euen Mitchell, Governor of Uganda 1935 – 1940. It consisted of a 1000 x 60 yard all-weather gravel strip cut out of the hillside, with a small tarmac apron on the north side fronting a small hangar and the control building, which still exists.

Aviation use seems to have been low-key, with little justification for what was quite a major construction - the £18,500 contract having been awarded to Gailey & Roberts Limited. All international traffic continued to use the existing airport at Entebbe as Port of entry – ironically, at the request of the Governor's office: although Kololo was designated a “Customs Aerodrome”, from 1 November 1937. Wilson Airways based a de Havilland Dragonfly (VP-KCA) at the airstrip for official and private charter within Uganda. There is no evidence, however, that any scheduled services were ever contemplated by this or any other airline.

A 1939 survey by Imperial Airways notes that prior notice of intended arrival should be sent to P.W.D. Kampala: that Customs, Health and Immigration, and flares for a night landing were also available with prior notice. There was a small P.W.D. workshop, and a Wilson Airways ground engineer. There were no wireless facilities, the nearest W/T station being at Entebbe with the callsign VQQ.

Aviation use during WW2 is unknown – the airstrip however had fallen out of use by 1946 and remained unused thereafter. During the late 1940s to early 1950s Wampewo Avenue and the residential development of Nyonyi Gardens were laid out across the eastern end of the strip, shortening the remaining runway length to approximately 800 yards (730 m).

The airstrip was used for the Independence Ceremony in October 1962 and for an open-air Mass by Pope Paul VI in 1969. Until the latter date, it had remained unfenced, and had been used for practice purposes by a large number of under-age and/or unqualified drivers. Over the years, the airstrip has hosted national events, especially on public holidays.

In 2012 the Ministry of Defence begun major construction works that included the erection of a public pavilion to be used during events. Below the pavilion are offices that are today used by the Ministry of Defence and the National Identification and Registration Authority (NIRA).

The airstrip was used to host the 2017 IAAF World Cross Country Championships. Minor changes were made to make the venue challenging for athletes. In recent years, it has also been the main venue for the annual MTN Kampala Marathon, Uganda's biggest marathon event.

Possibly the last use of the airstrip by fixed-wing aircraft was in the mid-1970s by members of the Safari Rally Committee who obtained special consent to operate from the site with a Cessna 310. Any such use would be impossible nowadays due to the presence of mature trees and permanent fencing. Aviation use is now restricted to rotary-wing aircraft. Government officials, including the president, use the site when flying by helicopter.

A portion of the airstrip has been reserved as a burial ground for ‘national heroes’. Two eminent Ugandans including Ignatius Musaazi, the founder of Uganda National Congress, and former president of Uganda Prof. Yusuf Kironde Lule, are buried at the grounds.

== See also ==
- KCCA
- Kampala
- Kololo
- CAA
- Uganda Airports
