= Daniel Kalinaki =

Ugandan journalist

- Born: April 1980 (age 46); Uganda
- Citizenship: Uganda
- Education: Makerere University (Bachelor of Arts in Mass Communication); City University of London (Master of Arts in International Journalism)
- Occupations: Journalist & community activist
- Years active: 1998 — present
- Known for: Publications
- Title: Managing Editor; Nation Media Group

Daniel Kalinaki (born 1980) is a Ugandan journalist that formerly worked with Nation Media Group as General Manager in Uganda in charge of Editorial. He had previously served as a Managing Editor, Regional Content for the same media group. He is married with three children.

== Background and education ==
Kalinaki was born in 1980. For his primary education, he attended Bat Valley Primary School, and Kamuli Boys Boarding Primary and thereafter joined Busoga College Mwiri for his O'Level certificate. He did his A'levels from Makerere High School and later enrolled at Makerere University, Uganda's oldest and largest public university. He graduated with a Bachelor of Arts in Mass Communication. Later, he obtained a Master of Arts in International Journalism from the City University of London.

== Career ==
At the age of 18, he joined the Crusader, a tri-weekly in Uganda. When it closed a year later, he started working at the Daily Monitor as a reporter, assistant radio news manager, deputy sports editor, associate editor, foreign news editor, news editor, investigations editor, and managing editor. He is a winner of the Chevening Scholarship, Sports Rookie of the Year, and the inaugural Tebere-Mudin Award for Journalistic excellence. Kalinaki's work has appeared in the Daily Monitor, The EastAfrican, the New Internationalist, Africa Confidential, the Weekly Observer, MS Magazine, and on the BBC World Service radio. He also teaches journalism part-time at Makerere University. He is a member of the International Consortium of Investigative Journalists (ICIJ). He retired from his job as General Manager-Editorial, at Nation Media Group Uganda on 1st April 2026.

== Activism ==
In 2000, he co-authored with Glen Williams, Joyce Kadowe, and Noerine Kaleeba Open Secret: People Living With HIV And Aids In Uganda. This book, which was published by the UK Charity ActionAid, was the first piece of literature to trace the importance of a candid and open approach to help fight social stigma and discrimination towards HIV and AIDS.

Between 2003 and 2004, Kalinaki and The Monitor were taken to court by the Ugandan government to stop the publication of a controversial story alleging that government officials had unduly influenced the constitutional review process.

On 12 August 2009, Kalinaki was again questioned by the Ugandan police for about six hours over the contents of Ugandan President Yoweri Kaguta Museveni’s controversial 15 July letter on politics in the Bunyoro sub-region. Kalinaki, who swore a charge-and-caution statement under pending charges of forgery and uttering a false document, was later released on non-cash bond of UGX:10 million. That case was dismissed for lack of evidence on 7 February 2012. That was the second time in 2009 that Kalinaki had been summoned to the CID to answer questions over stories published by the Daily Monitor Publication Limited. No charges were referred in the earlier case, which followed a story that was critical of the conduct of the operation against the Lord’s Resistance Army.

Kalinaki has written a book "Kizza Besigye and Uganda's Unfinished Revolution". The book examines Kizza Besigye's "ambitions, ideals, aspirations, illusions and delusions". It also outlines how Museveni has repeated the mistakes made by predecessors Idi Amin and Milton Obote. In the book, the author suggests what Ugandans can and should do about it.

== See also ==
- Aga Khan Fund for Economic Development
- List of newspapers in Uganda
- List of universities in Uganda
- Uganda People's Defense Force
