= Alikua Pyramid =

General information
- Status: Cultural heritage site
- Type: Pyramid
- Architectural style: Conical
- Construction started: 1911
- Completed: 1911
- Client: Belgian colonial administration
- Owner: Government of Uganda

Height
- Height: 3 m

Technical details
- Material: Stone and mud

Alikua Pyramid is a 3-metre high, conical, stone and mud structure built by the Belgian colonialists in Alikua Village, Yivu Subcounty, Maracha in Uganda during 1911. Two Belgian colonial officers are buried at the Alikua Pyramid, including Captain Von Kirkhoven. Local reports also identify other colonial-era burials in the vicinity with names such as Capt. Lingolingo and Atandi, but their exact association with the pyramid structure itself has not been conclusively documented in historical sources.

== Point of interest ==
Located in Maracha District, east of the Arua-Koboko Highway, about half an hour's drive from Arua, this pyramid is a cultural heritage that could be used to promote tourism in West Nile. The Belgians built it to signify that they were the first foreigners to settle there. But after signing the 1911 Agreement, it was heavily guarded by British Protectorate soldiers since West Nile had been transferred to British colonialists.

== See also ==
- Horns of the cattle monument
