= Emmanuel Bwayo Wakhweya =

Ugandan politician

Minister of Finance
- In office 1971 – 20 January 1975
- President: Idi Amin
- Succeeded by: Moses Ali

Personal details
- Born: 25 December 1936 Butiru, Mbale District, Uganda
- Died: 11 November 2001 (aged 64) Kampala, Uganda
- Spouse: Christine Namataka
- Children: 7
- Occupation: Politician, economist

Emmanuel Bwayo Wakhweya (25 December 1936 – 11 November 2001) was a Ugandan politician and economist. He was the Ugandan Minister of Finance under Idi Amin from 1971 until his high-profile defection in London in 1975.

== Biography ==
=== Early life and education ===
Emmanuel Bwayo Wakhweya was born in the village of Butiru in Mbale District of Uganda on 25 December 1936. Wakhweya was of Bugisu ethnicity.

Wakhweya began his education at the Bunyinza Primary School, which he graduated from in 1949. He then attended St. Peter's College in Tororo, Uganda, an all boys boarding school that Wakhweya graduated from in 1956. Wakhweya obtained a bachelor's degree from Delhi University in New Delhi, India in 1960. He came home to marry his high school sweetheart, Christine Namataka in 1961.

=== Career ===
After finishing his bachelor's degree with honors at New Delhi University in India, Wakhweya returned home to become one of the first Ugandan district administrative officers on 5 September 1960 during the British colonial administration. Upon Ugandan independence from the United Kingdom, Wakhweya became the Assistant Secretary to the Treasury in the Milton Obote administration. This began a rapid rise in the career of Wakhweya in the Ugandan Treasury. He was promoted to Under-Secretary to the Treasury on 4 November 1965, Deputy Governor Designate of the Bank of Uganda in 1968, and finally, he was appointed as the Minister of Treasury on 1 January 1969. Following the brutal 1971 Ugandan coup d'état led by Idi Amin, Wakhweya, as were all Permanent Secretaries at the time, was named Minister of Finance by Idi Amin in the newly formed administration, where Wakhweya was tasked with stabilizing the Economy of Uganda, which was rapidly deteriorating because of high state spending, a post-coup flight of foreign capital, and a lack of new investment from abroad.

=== Defection ===
During a previously scheduled visit to London, Great Britain, in early January 1975, Wakhweya announced his resignation and defected from the Idi Amin Cabinet on 20 January 1975. Wakhweya denounced Idi Amin and cited the chaos in the Idi Amin administration as having a negative effect on the economy and the lack of any ability to succeed as a finance minister in Idi Amin's one-man government. He was quoted as saying "It's hell to be in Uganda. I can't imagine how the ordinary people are still able to carry on because of the shortages of the simplest essentials of life and the soaring cost of living. Uganda is facing economic catastrophe. Either the economic forces will compel Amin to change his policies or there will be an explosion in the country because of popular discontent." Wakhweya later sent a telegram to Idi Amin at the end of the week officially announcing his resignation and exile from Uganda. At the time of his defection, Wakhweya was the longest serving cabinet minister in the Idi Amin administration and the last remaining member of Amin's original cabinet.

Upon his defection from Uganda and Idi Amin's government, Wakhweya and his claims of Ugandan economic instability were denounced in Uganda. Uganda Radio went on air announcing Wakhweya's defection by broadcasting, "Uganda's economy is much better than that of many other countries. His flight to London will not help him at all since Britain is also in economic chaos". On 23 January 1975, three days after the defection of Wakhweya in London, Idi Amin claimed that he would visit the United Kingdom to help the people of Wales, Scotland, and Northern Ireland seek self-determination, although like his threats to attend the Commonwealth Heads of Government Meeting 1973 in Ottawa, Canada or to attend the Wedding of Princess Anne and Mark Phillips, these threats failed to materialize.

Wakhweya was succeeded as Finance Minister by Moses Ali. According to Amnesty International, relatives of Wakhweya still in Uganda were imprisoned, tortured, and killed following his flight and defection, in a similar manner to the torture and murder of relatives of Joshua Wanume Kibedi following his defection and denunciation of Idi Amin the year before.

=== Post-defection career ===
Following his defection in London, Wakhweya migrated to Washington DC, where he began a life in exile in the United States. He started his US career at the World Bank and lived in Vienna, Virginia. He served as a senior economist at the World Bank from 1975 to 1977 and Chief Loan Officer on Sudan from 1977 to 1978. Following his career at the World Bank, Wakhweya was appointed to be a senior economic affairs officer for the United Nations Economic Commission for Africa in 1975 and moved to Addis Ababa, Ethiopia, before his eventual return to Uganda in 1979, where he served in various public service posts until his retirement from public service.

== Personal life ==
Wakhweya married Christine Namataka on 11 March 1961. They had one daughter, Dr. Angela Maria Wakhweya, and six sons together, Anthony, Richard, Stephen, Andrew, David and Emmanuel Junior. Wakhweya was a devoted Roman Catholic throughout his life, his wife more so. Wakhweya was also an avid sportsman, playing football and lawn tennis late into his life.

== Death ==
Wakhweya died at the age of 64 on 11 November 2001. He suffered a debilitating stroke that left him paralyzed and unable to speak in early 2001. He eventually succumbed to cardiac arrest, at International Hospital Kampala in Kampala, Uganda. Wakhweya was buried in Bunyinza Parish in his home village of Butiru, Mbale District, Uganda.

== See also ==
- Robert Bwayo Wakhweya
