= Kooki =

African Kingdom

Kooki Kingdom
- c. 1740–1896
- Flag

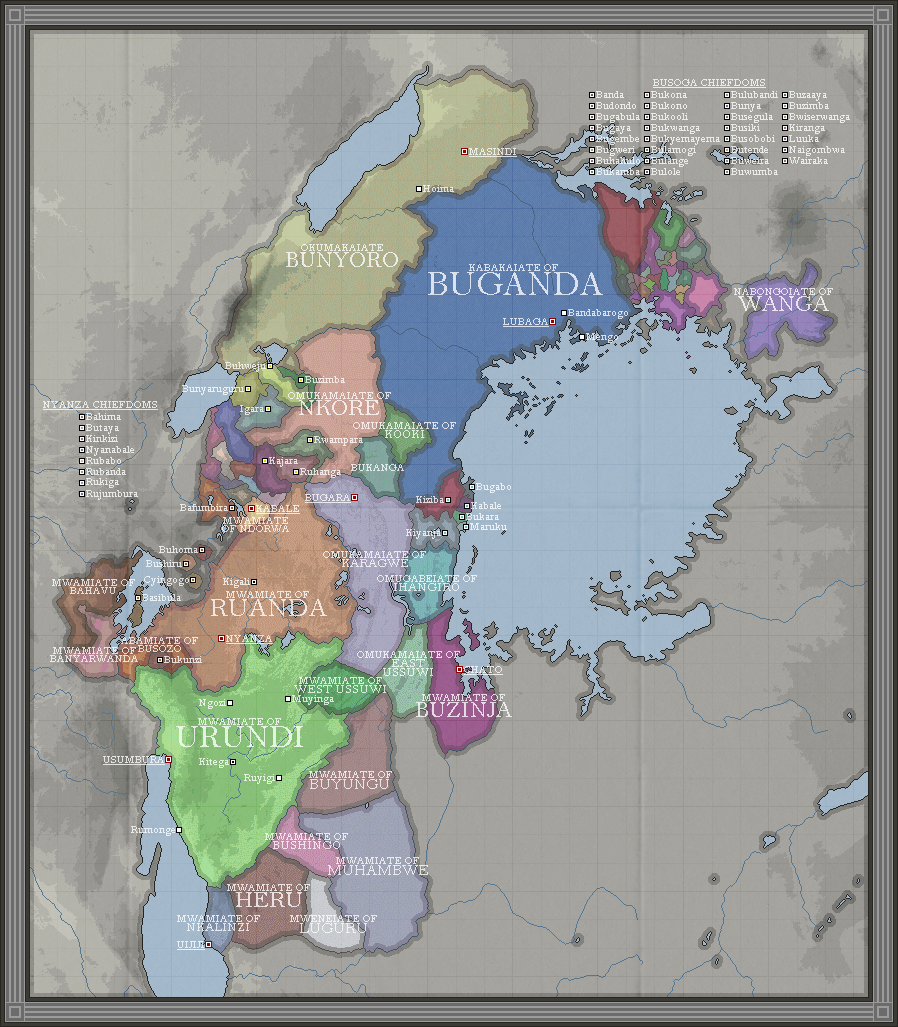
- Buganda, Kooki, and other African Great Lakes Kingdoms, c.1880
- Status: Tributary kingdom
- Capital: Rakai
- Common languages: Luganda
- Demonym: Kooki
- Government: Monarchy
- Kamuswaga
  - 1740–1750: Bwohe (first)
  - 1884–1907: Edward Kezekia Ndahura II (last)
  - 1954–1966: Yoweri Kayemba (official last)
- History
  - Break away from Bunyoro-Kitara: c. 1740
  - Incorporated into Buganda: 18 November 1896
  - Kingdom officially abolished by Uganda: 24 May 1966
Preceded by	Succeeded by
Bunyoro-Kitara	Kingdom of Buganda; Uganda
- Today part of: Uganda
- Lukooki can be considered a dialect of Luganda or a distinct language.

The Kingdom of Kooki, also known as the Kooki kingdom, was a pre-colonial African kingdom located within present-day Rakai District of Uganda that existed from approximately 1740 until 1896. The kingdom ceased to exist as an independent state in 1896 when it merged into the British Protectorate of Buganda. Its royal line still continues to this day as a non-sovereign monarchy, and is currently led by The Kamuswaga Apollo Sansa Kabumbuli II a hereditary ruler of the Cultural Institution under the Laws of Uganda

== History ==
=== Formation ===
The Kooki Kingdom was established sometime between the years 1696 to 1740 by the Mubito prince of Bwohe. Bwohe was a part of the Bunyoro-Kitara dynasty who with his followers broke away from the larger Bunyoro-Kitara Kingdom and created his own. Bwohe died in either 1740 or 1750.

=== Wars and Protection ===
After annexing the province of Buddu in the late 1700s from Bunyoro-Kitara, King Jjunju Ssendegeya of Buganda established a tributary relationship with the Kooki Kingdom in order to gain access to the large market in Karagwe.

In September 1888, Christian and Muslim rebels forced the king of Buganda, Mwanga II, into exile in German East Africa. A few month later in 1889, he asked the king of Kooki, Edward Kezekia Nadahura II, for military support against the rebels, but he was denied.

During the Mohammadan war between June and August 1893, rebel forces fled into the independent kingdom of Kooki after being pushed out of Gomba by British forces. Sir John Gray thought the rebels might settle down in Kooki due to its reputation for aiding slave dealers and the arms traffic. An expedition into Kooki were ordered and lieutenants Hobart and C.S Reddie were told to attack the capital of Rakai if Kooki gave the rebels sanctuary. The rebels quickly surrendered to British forces after they were attacked. Ndahura welcomed the British soldiers and had a mutual understanding with the British to not support rebels.

In 1894, Ndahura II, went to the city of Kampala and asked the British government if his kingdom could become a British protectorate but his request was denied. The following year in 1895, Ndahura II went back to Kampala and asked if his "territories maybe included in Buganda Kingdom under the protection of Her Majesty’s government.” Again he was denied.

=== Incorporation into Buganda ===
In 1896, the embattled Kooki was seeking protection against external invasion and signed an allegiance agreement at Mengo with the Kingdom of Buganda. This was done before the British commissioner to Uganda, Ernest James Lennox Berkeley, on behalf of the Queen of England. The treaty wouldn't be officially recognised and ratified until May 4, 1903, by commissioner Berkeley on behalf of the British Foreign Office.

Under this agreement the Kamuswaga (king) was given a special seat in Buganda's parliament (Lukiiko), cultural privileges, and a right to preserve cultural autonomy. The Kooki would also be made into a first class county (Saza) with a special status. The Kooki remained semi-independent until 1966 when Uganda's first Prime Minister Milton Obote abolished the Kingdom of Buganda.

== See also ==
- Kingdom of Buganda
- Uganda Protectorate
- Luganda language
- Mwanga II of Buganda
