= Ibrahim Mukiibi =

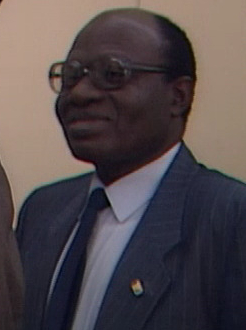
- Mukiibi in 1987

Minister of Foreign Affairs of Uganda
- In office 1986–1989
- President: Yoweri Museveni
- Preceded by: Olara Otunnu
- Succeeded by: Paul Ssemogerere

Minister of Internal Affairs of Uganda
- In office 1986–1987
- President: Yoweri Museveni
- Preceded by: Kahinda Otafiire
- Succeeded by: Crispus Kiyonga

Ugandan ambassador to the Scandinavian Countries
- President: Idi Amin

Ugandan ambassador to Ukraine
- In office 2002–2003
- President: Yoweri Museveni

Ugandan ambassador to Saudi Arabia
- In office 2005 – 22 November 2012
- President: Yoweri Museveni

Ugandan ambassador to Egypt
- In office 2003–2005
- President: Yoweri Museveni

Ugandan ambassador to Israel
- President: Yoweri Museveni

Ugandan ambassador to Tanzania
- In office 2006 – 9 October 2012
- President: Yoweri Museveni

Senior Adviser to the President
- In office 9 October 2012 – Incumbent
- President: Yoweri Museveni

Personal details
- Born: 5 July 1935 (age 91)
- Party: National Resistance Movement
- Occupation: Diplomat, minister, politician, hotelier, ambassador

Ibrahim Mukiibi (born 15 July 1935) is a Ugandan minister, diplomat, and entrepreneur. He was the Minister of Internal Affairs throughout the early 1990s under president Yoweri Museveni, and has been an ambassador for Uganda to numerous foreign nations. He is also a successful hotelier, running the Serenada Eco-Resort with his wife Harriet on the shores of Lake Victoria.

== Political career ==
=== Early days ===
One of Mukiibi's first prominent political roles was as Uganda's ambassador to the Scandinavian countries, a position he held during the Idi Amin regime. He was out of political power during Apolo Milton Obote's second term, but reentered when his ally Yoweri Museveni took power. He also worked at the African Union on behalf of Uganda during the reign of Idi Amin.

=== Minister ===
Mukiibi was a prominent minister in the early days of the Yoweri Museveni regime. He was Minister of Foreign Affairs of Uganda from 1986, when Museveni took power, until 1988. He then served as the powerful Minister of Internal Affairs of Uganda from 1989 to 1994, replacing Kahinda Otafiire, who had to resign as Minister of Internal Affairs after he brandished a pistol at a woman at a Kampala bar. Ibrahim Mukiibi left the role in 1987, being replaced by Crispus Kiyonga.

=== Return to ambassador ===
Mukiibi was appointed Uganda's ambassador to Ukraine in 2002, serving until 2003. In 2003, he moved to be Uganda's ambassador to Egypt. In 2005, in a cabinet reshuffling, Museveni moved Mukiibi to the role of ambassador to Saudi Arabia. He moved to Tanzania in 2006, his longest serving role with an important neighboring country. He left the role in 2012, to a farewell party in Dar es Salaam on behalf of the Tanzanian government.

=== Return to Uganda ===
In 2012, Mukiibi was brought back home to be closer to President Museveni and serve as a Senior Presidential Adviser on Retainer, alongside Francis Butagaira, the Ugandan Ambassador to the European Union in Brussels.

== Serenada Eco-Resort ==
During the early 1980s, Ambassador Ibrahim Mukiibi bought land from his brothet-in-law late Haji Tambula who was then married to his younger sister. The land is situated in Butere Village on the shores of Lake Victoria in the tropical forest in Kyaggwe, in the Mukono District. It's on this land that they established the Serenada Eco-Resort, featuring luxury tents, canoeing, a restaurant, and a bar, 25 minutes by boat from Ggaba. Ambassador Ibrahim Mukiibi owns the resort with his wife Harriet Mukiibi
