= Erinayo Wilson Oryema =

Ugandan police officer and politician

- Born: January 1, 1917; Nwoya, British Uganda
- Died: February 16, 1977 (aged 60)
- Education: Buwalasi Teacher Training College
- Military career
- Allegiance: British Empire (1939–1962); Uganda (1962–1977)
- Branch: King's African Rifles; Uganda Police Force
- Service years: 1939–1977
- Commands: Ugandan Police
- Conflicts: Second World War; East African campaign; Mau Mau Uprising; 1971 Ugandan coup d'état

Erinayo Wilson Oryema CPM (1 January 1917 – 16 February 1977) was a Ugandan police officer and politician. He was Uganda's first African Inspector General of Police (1964–1971), and later served as Minister of Land, Mineral, and Water Resources (1971–1974) and Minister of Land, Housing and Physical Planning (1974–1977) under the regime of Idi Amin.

In February 1977, Oryema, together with Archbishop Janani Luwum and Interior Minister Charles Oboth Ofumbi, were assassinated by Amin's security forces.

== Career ==
Erinayo Wilson Oryema began his career as a teacher. In 1935 he graduated from Buwalasi Teacher Training College in Mbale, after which he was posted to Gulu Primary School in Northern Uganda. He taught at the primary schools in Gulu and Kitgum between 1936 and 1939, and later became School Master.

Erinayo Wilson Oryema then enlisted in the Uganda Police Force in 1939. A year later he was promoted to the rank of Corporal, and the following year to Sub-Inspector. During World War II, he enlisted in the King's African Rifles Regiment and after the war ended, he returned to the Uganda Police Force. He made Inspector of Police in 1951, and was listed in the Queen's birthday honours in 1952, receiving the Colonial Police Medal for exemplary service. He was promoted to Assistant Superintendent of Police in 1954, and in 1956 to Deputy Superintendent.

When the colonial government started identifying African officers to take over the leadership of the force, Oryema was promoted to the rank of Superintendent in 1961, and the following year to Senior Superintendent of Police, then to Assistant Commissioner of Police. In 1963 Oryema was appointed the first African Deputy Inspector General of Police, and the following year, Inspector General of Police. He served in that capacity until 1971. In 1971, Oryema was appointed Minister of Minerals and Water Resources, and from 1976 he served as a Minister of Lands, Housing and Physical Planning.

=== Personal life ===
Oryema was born into the Acholi tribe from Northern Uganda. He was born in 1917 to Victoria Abum Daramoi, daughter of a blacksmith, Dwoka Adat, and Owiny Okoli of the Payira (Northern Uganda). He met his wife, Janet Manjeri Acoyo, daughter of Lasto Olum, and Abwoyo P'Wali of Palabek, Kitgum (Northern Uganda), a teacher who had qualified at Kabwangazi Teacher Training College, and they married in 1937 at the parish church of St Philips in Gulu town. They both taught at the same primary schools in Gulu and Kitgum between 1936 and 1939, where EW Oryema later became school master. They had 11 children: Gertrude, Mary, Joyce, William, Henry, Pamela, Betty, John, Irene, Anna, and Geoffrey, who went on to become an internationally renowned musician.

=== Death ===
In February 1977, Oryema, together with Archbishop Janani Luwum and Interior Minister Charles Oboth Ofumbi were arrested for an alleged coup attempt and died shortly after.

The official account describes the trio as being killed in a traffic accident while trying to overpower their driver. However, Henry Kyemba, Minister of Health in Amin's government, later wrote in his book A State of Blood, that "The bodies were bullet-riddled. The archbishop had been shot through the mouth and at least three bullets in the chest. The ministers had been shot in a similar way but one once in the chest and not through the mouth. Oryema had a bullet wound through the leg." According to the later testimony of witnesses, the victims had been taken to an army barracks, where they were interrogated, beaten and shot dead.

Erinayo Oryema was by the time of his death the longest serving minister in Amin's government. The murder of Oryema and Luwum had profound effects. Their deaths made many realise that no one was safe, and shortly thereafter several of Amin's ministers defected or fled to exile.

In May 2014, as part of 100 years of service of Uganda Police Force, the current Inspector General of Police Kale Kayihura announced a rectification campaign to make good what was done wrong in the past, and said that the late IGP Erinayo Oryema will be given a reburial with full honours.
