= Charles Oboth Ofumbi =

Ugandan politician

Minister of Internal Affairs
- In office 12 October 1973 – 16 February 1977
- President: Idi Amin
- Preceded by: Lt. Col. Ernest Obitre Gama
- Succeeded by: Mustafa Adrisi

Minister of Defence
- In office 2 February 1971 – 1973
- President: Idi Amin

Acting President of Uganda
- In office February 1971 – February 1971
- President: Idi Amin

Personal details
- Born: Arphaxad Charles Kole Oboth Ofumbi; July 1932 Nyamalogo, Tororo District, British Uganda
- Died: 16 February 1977 (aged 44) Kampala, Uganda
- Spouse: Elizabeth Oboth-Ofumbi
- Children: Several
- Education: Kings College Budo
- Occupation: Politician

Arphaxad Charles Kole Oboth Ofumbi (July 1932 – 16 February 1977) was a Ugandan politician who served as the Interior Minister of Uganda from October 1973 until his death in 1977.

== Early life and education ==
Oboth Ofumbi was born in Nyamalogo, in Eastern Uganda. He studied at Kisoko Primary School, Mbarara High School and Kings College Budo.

== Career ==
Having worked previously as a financial assistant in the district, Oboth Ofumbi was appointed District Commissioner for Bukedi District in Eastern Uganda in 1960. By 1963, he had moved from being a district administrator in Gulu to being the assistant secretary in the Office of the Prime Minister. Under the Government of Milton Obote, he was successively a chief accountant in the Defence ministry, acting Defence Minister and finally Defence Minister (1971). A good relationship with Idi Amin ensured that Oboth Ofumbi kept the role following Amin's coup in January 1971, serving as Defence Minister until 1973.

== Death ==
Oboth Ofumbi died while awaiting trial for his part in an alleged coup attempt. It is generally accepted that he was murdered on the orders of President Idi Amin, although the official account is of a car accident. Archbishop Janani Luwum and land minister Lt Col Erinayo Oryema were killed in the same incident. In July 2015, President Yoweri Museveni attended a service in his honour, outlining Oboth Ofumbi's apparent struggle against the Amin regime.

== Personal life ==
Oboth Ofumbi was from the Jopadhola ethnic group and he had several children with his wife Elizabeth.

== Authorship ==
Oboth Ofumbi wrote "History & Customs of the Jopadhola" in 1960, one of the first ethnographies of the Adhola people.

== Bibliography ==
- Oboth-Ofumbi, A.C.K. Padhola, East African Literature Bureau, Nairobi, 1959
