= Herbert Kanabi Nsubuga =

Ugandan academic, legislator and veterinary doctor

Professor Herbert Kanabi Nsubuga
- Born: Herbert Kanabi Nsubuga; 1 July 1927; Natete, Kampala
- Died: 23 May 2001 (aged 73); Mpigi District
- Education: Makerere University; Diploma in Veterinary Science; Master's degree of Science in Agriculture; The University of London; Bachelor's degree in Veterinary Medicine
- Occupations: veterinary doctor, politician and academic
- Title: President of The Uganda Society; Professor of Veterinary medicine

Herbert Kanabi Nsubuga (1 July 1927 – 23 May 2001) was a Ugandan, academic, legislator, and veterinary doctor. He was a Professor in veterinary medicine. He was the first veterinary graduate from Makerere University, and the first veterinary medicine graduate in East Africa. He served as a minister of Animal Resources in the Ministry of Agriculture and Animal Industry during Idi Amin regime. He was the first Ugandan to become part of Royal College of Veterinary Surgeons - London as a member.

Herbert also served as the president of The Uganda Society.

== Background and Education ==
Nsubuga was born to Samwiri Musoke and Edith Namirembe on 1 July 1927 in Nateete, Kampala.

On 9 January 1965, Nsubuga married Persis Mesca Nakibuuka at St. Paul Cathedral in Namirembe. They had 5 children. He died on 23 May 2001, from heart failure and stomach complications at Makutano Health Care in Bunamwaya, and he was buried shortly afterward.

Nsubuga attended Budo Junior School in 1936, and later he went to Kings College Budo completing his secondary education in 1947. In 1948, he joined Makerere University where he graduated with a diploma in Veterinary Science. Herbert attended University of London, United Kingdom and graduated with a bachelor's degree in veterinary medicine on a scholarship from the Buganda government. Herbert returned to Makerere University and earned a Master's degree of Science in Agriculture in 1970. In 1977, Nsubuga obtained a PhD for research on restructuring the cattle ranches in Uganda.

== Career ==
He served as lecturer and also a dean at Faculty of Agriculture and Forestry at Makerere University. Herbert served as the chairman King's College Budo up to 2001 when he died.

He served various positions and as a minister in the Ministry of Agriculture and Animal Industry during Idi Amin and Yusuf Lule regime.

Nsubuga has authored, co-authored several journals, articles and books on Livestock, Poultry, and Animal industry.

Publications by Herbert Kanabi Nsubuga

- Livestock farming in Uganda.
- Livestock and poultry farming in Uganda.
- Integration of domestic animals into human society: Professor Herbert S. Kanabi Nsubuga's inaugural lecture
- Cattle diseases and husbandry in tropical Africa: a case in Uganda
- Memoirs of a veteran
- Policy issues in Uganda's animal industry: a historical perspective.
