= NMS =

NMS may refer to:

== Organisations ==
- New Member States, the 10 member states that joined the EU in May 2004
- National Military Strategy
- National Market System of stock listing and trading
  - Regulation NMS, a Security and Exchange Commission regulation for the national market system
- Nepal Mathematical Society
- New Media Strategies
- National Movement Simeon II party in Bulgaria
- Norwegian Missionary Society
- Nari Mukti Sangh
- Northwest Microcomputer Systems, a defunct microcomputer company

== Education ==
- National Merit Scholarship of the USA

=== Schools ===
- Nagel Middle School, a public middle school located in Hamilton County, Ohio, USA
- Nippon Medical School, Tokyo, Japan
- Normandin Middle School, A middle school in New Bedford, Massachusetts, USA
- North Miami Senior High School, North Miami, Florida, USA
- Nigerian Military School, Zaria, Kaduna, Nigeria; a boarding school

=== Museums ===
- National Museum of Singapore
- National Museums Scotland
- Norfolk Museums Service, a museum organisation in Norfolk, England, UK

== Computing ==
- Network monitoring system
- Network management station
- Network management system
- non-maximum suppression (e.g. Canny edge detection)

== Anatomy, biology, medicine ==
- Neurally mediated syncope
- Neuroleptic malignant syndrome
- Neuromedin S, neuropeptide

== Arts, entertainment, media ==
- NMS, hip-hop group on the Big Dada label
- Nintendo Magazine System, a defunct British magazine, now known as Official Nintendo Magazine, launched in October 1992 and folded in January 2006
- Nintendo Magazine System (Australia), a defunct Australian magazine launched in April 1993 and folded in August 2000
- New Music Seminar, a now defunct annual summer music showcase in New York City
- No Man's Sky, a 2016 video game developed by Hello Games
- No More Sorrow, a song by American rock band Linkin Park of the Minutes to Midnight album.

== Other ==
- Lendamboi language (ISO 639 language code nms), a language of Vanuatu
- Romanian: Nava Majestății Sale, the prefix of Romanian Royal Navy ship names (1881 - 1947)
- National Marine Sanctuary of the USA; a type of marine protected area
- Volkswagen New Midsize Sedan, an automobile
- New make spirit, a stage in the distillation of Scotch whisky
- N. M. S. (alternatively, "No. Mo. So." or "Nor. Mor. Sor."), transliterations of the pen name of Thai author Bidyalongkorn (1876–1945)

== See also ==
- NM (disambiguation), for the singular of NMs
- nmss (disambiguation)
