= Maracha District =

- District
- District location in Uganda
- Coordinates: 03°17′00″N 30°56′00″E
- Country: Uganda
- Region: Northern Region
- Sub-region: West Nile sub-region
- Established: 1 July 2006
- Capital: Maracha Town

Area
  - Land: 1,572.2 km^{2} (607.0 sq mi)

Population (2024 Census)
  - Total: 234,712
  - Density: 118/km^{2} (310/sq mi)
- Time zone: UTC+3 (EAT)
- Website: www.maracha.go.ug

Maracha District is a district in the West Nile sub-region, in the Northern Region of Uganda. It was formed in 2006 from Arua District.

== History ==
Initially, the counties of Maracha and Terego were removed from Arua District to form a new, single district, which was also known as Maracha–Terego District or Nyadri District. From the district's inception, the location of its headquarters had been a contentious issue. In February 2007, one group of elected officials from the district led by the former Hon.Min Alex Onzima asked a court to block the location of the new district headquarters in an opposing location. After nearly five years of disagreement, Terego County opted to return to Arua District and Maracha County went on to form the new district on its own.

== Location ==
Maracha district is found in the North Western region lying between Arua and Koboko Districts. The District head quarters and commercial town are in Maracha Town Council, 24 miles north of Arua City, along the main road to South Sudan. Maracha District is bordered by Koboko District to the north, Yumbe District to the north-east, Democratic Republic of Congo to the west, Arua district to the south and south east and Terego District to the east. Maracha Town is approximately 39 kilometres (24 mi), by road, north of Arua, the largest town in the sub-region. It comprises two counties namely: Maracha County and Maracha East County composed of 14 rural sub counties, 5 town councils, 91 parishes and 691 villages. The coordinates of the district are 03 17N, 30 56E. (Latitude:3.28750; Longitude:30.94000).

== Population ==
The 1991 census estimated the population of the district at 107,600. The 2002 national census estimated the population at 145,700. In 2014, the national census enumerated the population at 186,134.

According to National Population and Housing Census 2024 undertaken by Uganda Bureau of Statistics (UBOS), the population distribution is composed of;

- Male=109,515
- Female=125,197
- District Population=234,71

== Economy ==
Crops raised include:

- Avocado
- Beans
- Cassava
- Flowers
- Groundnuts
- Maize
- Mangoes
- Matooke
- Millet
- Sesame
- Tobacco
- jackfruit.
- sweet potato

In addition to crops, the following animals are reared for food at home and for sale in the towns: African goats, bees for honey, Boer goats, chicken for eggs and meat, fish, and pigs.

== Notable people ==
- Abdulatif Tiyua, military officer and former rebel leader

== See also ==
- Maracha Town
- Alikua Pyramid
- Lugbara cuisine.
