= Nkuutu Memorial Secondary School =

School in Bugweri, Uganda

Nkuutu Memorial Secondary School (NMSS)
- P.O. Box 369 Bugweri; Busesa, Bugweri; Uganda

Information
- Type: Government aided
- Motto: Builds for the Future
- School district: Bugweri
- Head teacher: Moses Sekalala
- Enrollment: 2414
- Campus: Rural

Nkuutu Memorial Secondary School (NMSS) is a government-aided school in Bugweri, Uganda. It is a church-founded school and was first established as Busesa girls working together with Busesa boys on the opposite side of the road (now Busesa Mixed Primary School). As the need for a secondary school arose it was expanded into a secondary school and was named in memory of Shaban Kirunda Nkuutu who was killed during Idi Amin's regime.

In 2007 the school was selected to be among the pioneer schools for the Universal Secondary education (USE).

== History ==
Interior Minister John Mikloth Magoola Luwuliza-Kirunda helped to secure the funding to build the school in the early 1980s.

== See also ==
- Makerere College School
- Masaka Secondary School
- Mengo Senior School
