= Regina Mukiibi =

Ugandan businesswoman and entrepreneur

- Regina Naluyima Mukiibi
- Other names: Regina Mukiibi Mugongo
- Citizenship: Ugandan
- Education: Salisbury College of Funeral Sciences and Embalming
- Occupations: Businesswoman, entrepreneur, funeral director
- Known for: Uganda's first ever funeral home director
- Title: Co-founder of Uganda Funeral Services Ltd
- Awards: Uganda Investment Authority Woman Entrepreneur of Year (2007); Investor of the Year National Award (2009); Sustained Growth National Award (2009)

Regina Mukiibi (sometimes referred to as Regina Mukiibi Mugongo as well as Regina Naluyima Mukiibi) was a Ugandan businesswoman and entrepreneur notable for being the country's first ever funeral home director.

== Background and education ==
As she ventured into the funeral management business, Regina Mukiibi undertook professional training at the Salisbury College of Funeral Sciences and Embalming in London.

== Business ventures ==
After working as an accountant with the now defunct Uganda Commercial Bank, she operated a tour and travel company which she left in order to start the funeral management business. In 1996, Regina Mukiibi jointly registered Uganda Funeral Services, a funeral service management company with her since deceased brother, Freddie Katamba Mukiibi.

== Awards ==
- Uganda Investment Authority Woman Entrepreneur of Year - 2007
- Investor of the Year National Award - 2009
- Sustained Growth National Award - 2009
