= Maracha Town =

- Map of Uganda showing the location of Maracha.
- Coordinates: 03°17′18″N 30°56′27″E
- Country: Uganda
- Region: Northern Region
- Sub-region: West Nile
- District: Maracha District
- Time zone: UTC+3 (EAT)

Maracha is a town in the West Nile sub-region, in Northern Uganda. It is the main municipal, administrative and commercial center of Maracha District and the headquarters of the district are located there. The district is named after the town.

== Location ==
Maracha is located on the Vurra–Arua–Koboko–Oraba Road, approximately 39 kilometres (24 mi), by road, north of Arua, the nearest large town. This is about 517 kilometres (321 mi) northwest of Kampala, the capital and largest city in the country. The coordinates of Maracha Town are 3°17'18.0"N, 30°56'27.0"E (Latitude:3.288337; Longitude:30.940828).

== Points of interest ==
- The Vurra–Arua–Koboko–Oraba Road passes through the middle of town in a north to south configuration.
- Maracha central market
- Maracha District Local government offices
- Maracha Town Council offices

== See also ==
- Maracha District
- West Nile sub-region
- Northern Region, Uganda
