= Joshua Wanume Kibedi =

Ugandan lawyer and politician

Foreign Minister of Uganda
- In office January 1971 – January 1973
- President: Idi Amin
- Preceded by: Sam Odaka
- Succeeded by: Paul Etiang (acting)

Ambassador of Uganda to the United Nations
- In office 1986–1988
- Preceded by: Olara Otunnu
- Succeeded by: Perezi Kamunanwire

Personal details
- Born: 3 August 1941 Busesa, Iganga District, Uganda Protectorate
- Died: 13 June 2016 (aged 74) London, United Kingdom
- Spouse: Betty Wanume Kibedi
- Children: Seven
- Profession: Lawyer

Joshua Wanume Kibedi (3 August 1941 – 13 June 2016) was an Ugandan lawyer, politician and diplomat, who served as the Foreign Minister between January 1971 and January 1973 during the early years of the regime of Idi Amin. However, Kibedi resigned as Foreign Minister in 1973 after the murder of his uncle, Shaban Nkutu, by Amin. Kibedi went into exile and became a leading critic of Idi Amin's dictatorship. He would later serve as Uganda's Ambassador to the United Nations from 1986 to 1988.

== Biography ==
Joshua Wanume Kibedi was born in Busesa, Iganga District, Uganda Protectorate, on 3 August 1941. His father, Elkanah Kibedi, the former headmaster of Busoga College Mwiri, was one of the first members of the Busoga people to attend school. Kibedi was descended from the Baisemenhya, one of the eleven royal clans of the Busoga people. The Baisemenhya royal clan traces their ancestry to the Bunyoro royal family.

Kibedi first attended Busesa Primary school and then enrolled at Busoga College Mwiri from 1955 until 1960. He moved to the United Kingdom circa 1960 to train at a law firm and work under an Inn of Court, which qualified him to become a Barrister-at-Law. He returned to Uganda around 1960 and became the first Ugandan solicitor to qualify to bring cases before the East African Court of Appeals. Politically, he became a member of the Uganda People's Congress.

Kibedi was appointed Foreign Minister of Uganda in January 1971 soon after Idi Amin had seized power in 1971 Ugandan coup d'état. Kibedi's sister, then-Ugandan First Lady Mama Maryamu Kibedi Amin, was the first wife of Idi Amin, making him his brother-in-law. In 1972, Kibedi supported Idi Amin's decision to expel the Asian population from the country.

In January 1973, Ugandan soldiers, led by Capt. Issa Habib Galungbe, kidnapped Kibedi's uncle, Shaban Nkutu, the former Minister of Health from 1966 to 1967, from Scindia Road in Jinja, Uganda. Nkutu was later murdered. His body was finally discovered in a mass grave in 2005, 32 years after his kidnapping.

Foreign Minister Kibedi was attending a foreign ministers' meeting of Organisation of African Unity member states in Ghana on 11 January 1973, when he received confirmation that his brother-in-law, President Idi Amin, was responsible for the murder of his uncle. Rather than returning to Uganda, Kibedi immediately announced his resignation from the Foreign Ministry and the president's cabinet, denounced Amin, and went into exile in the United Kingdom. Afterward, his family was tortured; as had happened with other defectors, including Emmanuel Blayo Wakhweya. He settled in London and became a leading critic of the Idi Amin dictatorship during the 1970s. Kibedi's sister, First Lady Maryamu Kibedi Amin, soon fled the country via Kenya in 1973 as well, leaving her children with Amin. She was able to flee to the United Kingdom through the aid of the then Vice-President of Kenya, Daniel arap Moi. Idi Amin declared his divorce from his first wife shortly afterwards.

Kibedi established a successful law practice, Kibedi and Co. Advocates, located on High Street in Lewisham, London. He worked with his second cousin, Kirunda Kivejinja, who was active with the National Resistance Movement's (NRM) external division, to oppose the Idi Amin dictatorship.

During the 1980s, Kibedi supported the National Resistance Movement, led by Yoweri Museveni, during the Ugandan Bush War against President Milton Obote. Museveni's NRM won the war and ousted Obote from power.

In 1986, Museveni appointed Kibedi as Ambassador to the United Nations, a diplomatic post he held from 1986 to 1988. President Museveni also appointed him as Uganda's Ambassador to the Soviet Union in 1990, but Kibedi declined the appointment to focus on his law firm.

In 2010, Kibedi was appointed chairman of the Immigration and Citizenship Board by President Yoweri Museveni. He chaired the Immigration and Citizenship Board from 2010 until 2014.

He died at St Thomas' Hospital in London on 13 June 2016, at the age of 74, after a coma which lasted several days. He had suffered from gout, arthritis and lung fibrosis. Kibedi was survived by his wife, Betty Wanume Kibedi, and their six children. His death was announced by Deputy Prime Minister Kirunda Kivejinja, who is also Kibedi's second cousin. Kibedi's remains were flown back to Entebbe International Airport on 29 June 2016. A memorial service for Kibedi was held at All Saints Cathedral in Kampala followed by a burial in Busesa on 2 July 2016.

== See also ==
William Banage
