= Financial Intelligence Authority (Uganda) =

Government agency established by the Parliament of Uganda

Uganda Financial Intelligence Authority
- FIA

Agency overview
- Formed: 2014; 12 years ago
- Jurisdiction: Government of Uganda
- Headquarters: Kampala, Uganda
- Agency executives: Chairman, Leo Kibirango; Executive Director, Sydney Asubo
- Parent agency: Uganda Ministry of Finance, Planning and Economic Development
- Website: Homepage

The Financial Intelligence Authority (FIA) is a government agency established by the Parliament of Uganda to monitor, investigate, and prevent money laundering in the country. It is also responsible for the enforcement of Uganda's anti-money laundering laws and the monitoring of all financial transactions inside the country's borders.

== Location ==
The agency's headquarters are located on the Fourth Floor, Wing B, in Rwenzori Towers, along Nakasero Road, on Nakasero Hill, in Kampala, he capital and largest city in Uganda. geographical coordinates of the agency's headquarters are: 0°19'03.0"N, 32°34'47.0"E (Latitude:0.317500; Longitude:32.579722).

== History ==
The parliamentary bill creating UFIA was passed in July 2013, after two previous attempts. Known as the Anti-Money Laundering Act, the law puts Uganda in harmony with its East African Community neighbors, Kenya, Tanzania, and Rwanda, which passed similar laws before.

== Administration ==
Established under the Ministry of Finance and Economic Planning, UFIA operates independently under the direction of its own board of directors. UFIA's management team is led by the executive director, who is appointed by the Minister of Finance on the recommendation of the board. In August 2014, the Ugandan Cabinet agreed on the following five members, to constitute the UFIA board.

- Leo Kibirango - Chairperson
- Grace Akullo
- Patrick Ocailap
- Titus Wasswa Mulindwa
- Patricia Mutesi

== Recent developments ==
In July 2014, Maria Kiwanuka, Uganda's finance minister, appointed Sydney Asubo, an experienced lawyer, to act as the interim executive director for six months while the agency's board of directors was being constituted.

Asubo's mandate includes the establishment of the agency, by hiring staff and setting up operation structures.

In February 2016, the UFIA signed a Memorandum of Understanding (MoU) with the Directorate of Public Prosecutions and the Uganda Registration Services Bureau. The MoU is meant to minimize the bureaucracy associated with government institutions and ease free flow of information between the three government agencies.

== See also ==
- Bank of Uganda
- Economy of Uganda
- Uganda Revenue Authority
