= Common Man's Charter =

Ugandan manifesto

The Common Man's Charter was a document submitted to the Ugandan People's Congress by Ugandan President Milton Obote, forming a part of the country's so-called "Move to the Left". In it, Obote asserted several key principles of his vision for Uganda, including a commitment to democracy.

It built on agreements from the June 1968 conference, and was signed into law on 24 October 1969 in an emergency meeting in Kampala. It was subtitled "First Steps for Uganda to Move to the Left".
