= National Identification and Registration Authority =

Ugandan government agency

Coordinates: 00°19′37″N 32°35′34″E

National Identification and Registration Authority (NIRA)
- Trade name: NIRA
- Type: Parastatal
- Industry: Registration of births and deaths
- Founded: 2015
- Headquarters: Independence Grounds; Kololo Airstrip; Kampala, Uganda
- Key people: Executive Director Rosemary Kisembo
- Products: National Identification Register, personal citizen identification cards, personal alien identification cards, birth certificates, death certificates
- Website: Homepage

The National Identification and Registration Authority (NIRA) is a government-owned organisation in Uganda, mandated to register births and deaths in the country and to develop a National Identification Register for both citizens and legally resident non-citizens. NIRA is also mandated to issue national identification numbers and cards for every citizen and lawfully admitted alien.

== Location ==
The headquarters of the NIRA are temporarily located at Independence Park, Kololo Airstrip, on Kololo Hill, in Kampala, Uganda's capital city. The coordinates of Kololo Airstrip are 0°19'37.0"N, 32°35'34.0"E (Latitude:0.326955; Longitude:32.592787).

== Overview ==
NIRA was created by the Ugandan parliament on 26 March 2015 in the law known as the Registration of Persons Act 2015. Before then, registration of personal vital data was gathered under various laws by different government agencies, including the Uganda Registration Services Bureau, the Electoral Commission, the Directorate of Citizenship and Immigration Control, the Uganda Revenue Authority, various local governments, and others. To harmonize and standardize the collection of personal identifying information of all citizens and legally resident non-citizens, the Ugandan parliament empowered NIRA to be solely responsible for and to share that data with other government agencies that may require that data. NIRA is also specifically charged with developing a National Identification Register of the county's citizens and legally resident non-citizens.

As of April 2016, work on fully establishing the agency is continuing. A board of directors is yet to be fully constituted by the Minister of Internal Affairs. Registration of people between ages 0 and 16 years has not yet started. Mechanisms for registering Ugandans living and working outside Uganda are still being worked out. As at November 2015, there was no law authorizing the re-issuance of replacement cards to recipients who had lost the originals. At that time, over 16 million cards had been issued, but close to three million citizens had not picked up their IDs.

== Governance ==
The executive director of NIRA is Rosemary Kisembo, an ICT expert and administrator who was sworn in during 2021.
