= Uganda Registration Services Bureau =

Government agency in Uganda

Coordinates: 0°19′04.0″N 32°34′39.0″E

- URSB

Agency overview
- Formed: 2012
- Jurisdiction: Government of Uganda
- Headquarters: Uganda Business Facilitation Centre, Plot 1 Baskerville Avenue, Kololo Kampala, Uganda
- Agency executives: Mercy Kainobwisho, registrar general; Francis Butagira, chairman of the board
- Parent agency: Uganda Ministry of Justice and Constitutional Affairs
- Website: Homepage

The Uganda Registration Services Bureau (URSB) is a semi-autonomous government agency, established by Act of Parliament in 1998 in Uganda. URSB is responsible for civil registrations (including marriages and divorces but not including births, adoptions, or deaths), business registrations (setups and liquidations), registration of patents and intellectual property rights, insolvency and receivership, chattels registry and any other registrations required by law.

== Locations ==
The headquarters of URSB are located at Plot 1 Baskerville Avenue, in Kampala, the capital and largest city of Uganda. In addition, URSB maintains branch offices at the following locations:

1. Georgian House Branch - George Street, Kampala
2. Posta Branch - Posta Uganda Main Office, Booths 2 & 3, Kampala Road, Kampala
3. Mbale Branch - Ministry of Justice and Constitutional Affairs, 3 Park Crescent, Mbale
4. Mbarara Branch - 1 Kamukuzi Hill, Mbarara
5. Gulu Branch – 6B Princess Road, Gulu
6. Arua Branch – 42/44 Packwach Road, Arua
7. Masaka Branch - 26 Edward Avenue, Mayors Garden
8. Hoima Branch - Hoima District Local Government Headquarters, Kyenjonjo-Hoima Road, Kasingo Cell, Hoima-Regional Service Uganda Centre Building Youth Library

== Overview ==
In 2015, URSB was awarded "global recognition for improved service delivery, client satisfaction, innovation and leadership", by Otherways Management Association Club, a France-based organisation.

One of the priority areas that URSB is working on is establishing a national registry of movable assets, also known as a "chattels registry", to enable micro, small, and medium businesses to borrow from the formal banking sector, which requires collateral.

In February 2016, URSB signed a memorandum of understanding (MoU) with the Directorate of Public Prosecutions and the Uganda Financial Intelligence Authority. The MoU was intended to ease the sharing of information between the three government agencies and reduce government bureaucracy. The ultimate goal is to cut down on the concealment of assets and illegal money laundering.

== Administration ==
=== Board of directors ===
According to URSB's website, the members of the board of directors are:

- Francis Butagira - chairman
- Caroline T Egesa - Kampala, board secretary
- Ben Anyama
- Moses Zziwa
- Emmanuel Dombo
- Sarah Mitanda
- Julius Kasirye
- Swizin Mugyema
- George Fred Kagimu
- Mercy Kainobwisho - registrar general & CEO of URSB, Kampala

=== Management ===
Mercy K Kainobwisho serves as registrar general; the deputy registrar general of URSB is Alex Anganya (finance and administration).

== See also ==
- Uganda Revenue Authority
- Insurance Regulatory Authority of Uganda
- Uganda Retirement Benefits Regulatory Authority
- National Social Security Fund (Uganda)
