= 2025 in Uganda =

- Decades: 2000s; 2010s; 2020s
- See also: Other events of 2025; Timeline of Ugandan history

Events in the year 2025 in Uganda.

== Incumbents ==
- President: Yoweri Museveni
- Vice president: Jessica Alupo
- Prime minister: Robinah Nabbanja

== Events ==
=== January ===
- 30 January – The first fatality from Sudan ebolavirus in Uganda since 2022 is reported in a nurse at the Mulago Hospital in Kampala. The subsequent outbreak is declared over by Ugandan authorities on 26 April with a total of 14 cases and four deaths reported.
- 31 January – The Supreme Court of Uganda rules against the practice of trying civilians before military courts following an appeal by former opposition MP Michael Kabaziguruka. However, the Uganda People's Defence Force announces that it would continue trying opposition leader Kizza Besigye on treason charges.

=== March ===
- 13 March – 2025 Kawempe North by-election.
- 14 March – A court in the United Kingdom convicts High Court of Uganda judge and United Nations judicial officer Lydia Mugambe of human trafficking and conspiracy to intimidate a victim in a case of a young Ugandan woman whom she had brought to the UK.

=== May ===
- 20 May – Parliament passes a bill authorizing military trials for civilians.

=== June ===
- 3 June – Two suspected militants are killed in a bombing attempt on a Catholic shrine in Munyonyo, Kampala.
- 5 June – The World Bank lifts a ban on granting loans to Uganda that it imposed in 2023 following the passage of anti-LGBT legislation.
- 10 June – The European Union removes Uganda from its list of high risk jurisdictions for money laundering and terrorism financing.
- 16 June – Yoweri Museveni signs the Uganda Peoples' Defence Forces Act 2025, reintroducing military trials for civilians.

=== July ===
- 10 July – Eighteen people are injured in clashes between Sudanese and South Sudanese refugees at the Kiryandongo Refugee Settlement.
- 12 July – Uganda reopens its border with the Democratic Republic of the Congo following a six-month closure caused by the 2025 Goma offensive.
- 12 July – A Sudanese refugee is killed in an attack blamed on South Sudanese refugees at the Kiryandongo Refugee Settlement.
- 14 July – President Museveni orders the suspension of dual citizenship applications for Sudanese and Rwandan nationals.
- 28 July – At least four South Sudanese soldiers are killed in clashes with Ugandan soldiers along the South Sudan–Uganda border near the West Nile sub-region.

=== August ===
- 21 August – Uganda announces an agreement to host deportees from the United States with no criminal record and are not unaccompanied minors.

=== September ===
- 9 September – The war crimes trial of Lord's Resistance Army commander Joseph Kony begins in the International Criminal Court.
- 23-24 September – The Electoral Commission nominates eight candidates, including President Museveni and Bobi Wine, ahead of the 2026 Ugandan general election.

=== October ===
- 22 October – Two buses collide head-on on the Kampala–Gulu Highway in Kiryandongo, killing at least 46 people.

=== November ===
- 3 November – At least 18 people are reported killed while 20 others are reported missing following landslides in the Eastern Region.
- 6 November – The ICC confirms charges of war crimes and crimes against humanity against Joseph Kony.
- 8 November – Two Kenyan activists abducted by armed men after attending a rally by Bobi Wine on 1 October are released and repatriated after President Museveni announces that they had been arrested for plotting to overthrow him.

=== December ===
- 3 December – Catholic priest Deusdedit Ssekabira is reportedly kidnapped in Masaka by men in Ugandan army uniforms; the military later confirms he is in custody facing charges related to violent subversive activities.
- 19 December – Prison officer Lawrence Ampe is dismissed from the Uganda Prisons Service for breaching standing orders after using TikTok to criticise the government, and promote opposition politician Bobi Wine.

== Sports ==
- 13 September 2024 – 24 May 2025 – 2024–25 Uganda Premier League
- 8–19 July – 2025 Rugby Africa Cup in Kampala.
- 2–30 August – 2024 African Nations Championship (co-hosted)

== Holidays ==
- 1 January – New Year's Day
- 26 January – Liberation Day
- 16 February – Archbishop Janani Luwum Day
- 8 March – International Women's Day
- 30 March – Ramadan Bairam Holiday
- 18 April – Good Friday
- 20 April – Easter Sunday
- 21 April – Easter Monday
- 1 May – Labour Day
- 3 June – Uganda Martyrs' Day
- 6 June – Eid al-Adha
- 9 June – National Heroes' Day
- 9 October – Independence Day
- 25 December – Christmas Day
- 26 December – Boxing Day

== See also ==
- International Conference on the Great Lakes Region

== Deaths ==
- 9 January:
  - Margaret Baba Diri, 70, politician, MP (since 1996).
  - Muhammad Ssegirinya, 37, politician, MP (since 2022).
- 14 July: George Kanyeihamba, 85, justice of the Supreme Court (1997–2009).
- 11 August: Mary Karooro Okurut, 70, MP (since 2004).
- 22 October: Charles Martin Wamika, 72, Roman Catholic prelate, bishop of Jinja (since 2010).
