= 2026 in Uganda =

- Decades: 2000s; 2010s; 2020s
- See also: Other events of 2026; Timeline of Ugandan history

Events in the year 2026 in Uganda.

== Incumbents ==
- President: Yoweri Museveni
- Vice president: Jessica Alupo
- Prime minister: Robinah Nabbanja

== Events ==
=== January ===
- 5 January – The government bans live broadcasts and streaming of riots, unlawful processions, and violent incidents ahead of the presidential election.
- 13 January – The Uganda Communications Commission imposes a suspension of mobile internet services, citing misinformation, electoral fraud and incitement of violence.
- 15 January – 2026 Ugandan general election: Yoweri Museveni is reelected president with 71.65% of the vote.
- 16 January – At least seven people are killed in clashes between police and opposition supporters in Butambala District following the general election.
- 18 January – Authorities partially restore internet services following President Museveni’s election victory, allowing business use while keeping social media blocked.
- 22 January – Opposition MP Muwanga Kivumbi is arrested on charges related to the clashes in Butambala on 16 January.

=== February ===
- 18 February – Police in Arua arrest two women on allegations of engaging in same-sex acts, after they were reportedly seen kissing in public, in violation of the Anti-Homosexuality Act, 2023.

=== March ===
- 8 March – Jacob Kiplimo sets a new men’s half-marathon world record of 57:20 in Lisbon, improving his previous record by 10 seconds.
- 10 March – Five people are killed and 11 others are injured when a bus collides with a truck on the Kampala–Gulu Highway near Bweyale Town, Kiryandongo District.
- 11 March – Uganda announces visa-free entry to nationals of 40 countries.
- 14 March – Opposition leader Bobi Wine announces his departure from Uganda after having gone into hiding since the presidential election in January.
- 17 March – The southern white rhinoceros is reintroduced at Kidepo Valley National Park for the first time since being poached into extinction at the park in 1983.

=== April ===
- 2 April – Four children are killed in a mass stabbing at a school in Kampala. The perpetrator, an adult man, is arrested and sentenced to death on 30 April.
- 28 April – Authorities announce the detention of 231 foreign nationals following two operations against human trafficking and online scams.

=== May ===
- 12 May – Yoweri Museveni is inaugurated to a seventh term as president.
- 15 May – The Ugandan Health Ministry confirms an outbreak of Bundibugyo ebolavirus disease, after a Congolese patient dies in intensive care in Kampala.
- 18 May – President Museveni signs the Protection of Sovereignty Bill into law, forbidding foreign interference in the country.
- 19 May – The government issues a temporary ban on handshakes, hugs, and unnecessary physical contact in response to the 2026 Ituri Province Ebola epidemic.
- 24 May – A minivan carrying personnel from the Uganda Revenue Authority collides with an elephant inside Murchison Falls National Park, killing three passengers.
- 26 May – 2026 Central Africa Ebola epidemic: Canada imposes a mandatory 21-day self-isolation for travelers arriving from Uganda, the Democratic Republic of the Congo, and South Sudan, and suspends visa applications from those countries effective from the next day until 29 August.
- 27 May – 2026 Central Africa Ebola epidemic: The government closes its border with the Democratic Republic of the Congo for four weeks in an effort to limit the spread of the Bundibugyo ebolavirus.

=== June ===
- 15 June – Opposition politician Erias Lukwago is arrested by soldiers after pursuing a case against army chief Muhoozi Kainerugaba.
- 28 June – General Muhoozi Kainerugaba orders the closure of the Daily Monitor and NTV Uganda, stating that he does not believe in a free press. Military personnel are deployed to the media groups' premises in Kampala.

=== July ===
- 7 July – A group of Ugandan farmers file a case in the UK High Court against the East African Crude Oil Pipeline (EACOP), seeking to apply Ugandan constitutional, environmental, and climate law to the project.
- 11 July – At least 16 people die of starvation in the Karamoja sub-region following a prolonged drought that destroyed crops.
- 16 July – A school bus returning from an educational trip to Sipi Falls crashes in Kapchorwa District, killing 21 people.

=== August ===
- 2 August – Uganda inaugurates Yonatan Netanyahu's statue as a honour at Entebbe International Airport.
- 3 August – A taxi van and a truck collide in Kalungu District, killing 14 people.
- 6 August – Uganda authorizes deploying its soldiers for the International Stabilization Force in Gaza.
- 26 August – 2026 Central Africa Ebola epidemic: The World Health Organization declares the end of the Bundibugyo ebolavirus outbreak in Uganda, following the government's declaration a month earlier; the outbreak recorded 20 cases and two deaths.

=== September ===
- 3 September – Uber announces the immediate closure of its ride-hailing in Uganda, ending its operations in the country after beginning there in 2016.

=== October ===
- 25 October – The government imposes a 21-day quarantine on citizens returning from the Democratic Republic of the Congo as part of tightened Ebola precautions.

=== November ===
- 2 November – Former deputy Uganda People's Defence Force commander and presidential adviser Peter Elwelu is arrested on suspicion of involvement in subversion and destabilization.

== Holidays ==
- 1 January – New Year's Day
- 26 January – Liberation Day
- 16 February – Archbishop Janani Luwum Day
- 8 March – International Women's Day
- 20 March – Ramadan Bairam Holiday
- 3 April – Good Friday
- 5 April – Easter Sunday
- 6 April – Easter Monday
- 1 May – Labour Day
- 27 May – Eid al-Adha
- 3 June – Uganda Martyrs' Day
- 9 June – National Heroes' Day
- 9 October – Independence Day
- 25 December – Christmas Day
- 26 December – Boxing Day

== Deaths ==
- 17 January – Stella Isodo Apolot, 51, politician, MP (since 2021).
- 19 April – Helen Nakimuli, 40, politician, MP (since 2021).
- 1 June – Master Parrot, 47-48, dancehall and Afro-pop musician.
- 6 June – Musaazi Charles Kalooli, 32, social media influencer.
- 18 July – Moses Ali, 87, military officer, deputy prime minister (1989–1991, 2013–2026).
- 19 July – Christopher Senyonjo, 94, Anglican bishop and LGBT rights campaigner.
- 5 August – David Owori, 27, footballer (SC Villa, national team).
- 27 August – Rukidi IV of Tooro, 34, traditional ruler, Omukama of Tooro (since 1995).
- 24 September – Moses Matovu, 77, musician (Afrigo Band).
- 8 November – Kakule William, actor (Who Killed Captain Alex?).
