= 2027 in Uganda =

- Decades: 2000s; 2010s; 2020s
- See also: Other events of 2027; Timeline of Ugandan history

Events in the year 2027 in Uganda.

== Events ==
- 19 June – 17 July – The 2027 Africa Cup of Nations (AFCON 2027) in Kenya, Uganda, and Tanzania

== Holidays ==
- 1 January – New Year's Day
- 26 January – Liberation Day
- 16 February – Archbishop Janani Luwum Day
- 8 March – International Women's Day
- 9 March – Ramadan Bairam Holiday
- 26 March – Good Friday
- 28 March – Easter Sunday
- 29 March – Easter Monday
- 1 May – Labour Day
- 16 May – Eid al-Adha
- 3 June – Uganda Martyrs' Day
- 9 June – National Heroes' Day
- 9 October – Independence Day
- 25 December – Christmas Day
- 26 December – Boxing Day
