= 2024 in Uganda =

- Decades: 2000s; 2010s; 2020s
- See also: Other events of 2024; Timeline of Ugandan history

Events in the year 2024 in Uganda.

== Incumbents ==
- President: Yoweri Museveni
- Vice president: Jessica Alupo
- Prime minister: Robinah Nabbanja

== Events ==
=== January ===
- 2 January – A Ugandan People's Defence Force helicopter crashes in the village of Nyamisigiri, Kabarole District, Uganda, killing two people on board the helicopter and one person on the ground.
- January – 19th Summit of the Non-Aligned Movement

=== February ===
- 23 February - The Financial Action Task Force removes Uganda from its "gray list" of countries not fully complying with measures to combat money laundering and terrorism financing.

=== April ===
- 3 April – The Court of Appeal of Uganda upholds the Anti-Homosexuality Act, 2023, which prescribes the death penalty for certain homosexual acts.

=== May ===
- 9 – 19 May: Uganda conducts a national population census.

=== July ===
- 8 July – A United Nations report formally accuses the Uganda People's Defence Force of providing military support to the M23 rebel group in eastern Democratic Republic of the Congo. Uganda denies the claims.
- 23 July – At least 45 people are detained and some are charged while participating in anti-corruption protests in Kampala that involve marching to the Parliament building.
- 26 July – 11 August: Uganda at the 2024 Summer Olympics

=== August ===
- 5 August –
  - Nearly 100 Congolese National Police officers flee to Uganda as fighting between M23 rebels and the FARDC intensifies in the Democratic Republic of the Congo.
  - Uganda Police arrest and charge fourteen opposition officials and lawmakers with terrorism charges for their participation in anti-government and anti-corruption protests in July.
- 9 August – Kiteezi Landfill landslide: At least 35 people are killed and 28 others are reported missing following a landslide caused by heavy rains at the Kiteezi Landfill in Kampala.
- 13 August – A panel of the High Court in Gulu convicts former Lord's Resistance Army commander Thomas Kwoyelo of 44 counts of war crimes made from 1992 to 2005.
- 20 August – The Ministry of Energy and Mineral Development confirms the presence of oil exploration activities in the Moroto-Kadam and Kyoga Basins.

=== September ===
- 3 September – Leading opposition leader Bobi Wine is seriously injured after being shot in his leg with a tear gas canister by police during an altercation in Bulindo, Wakiso District.
- 5 September – Athlete Rebecca Cheptegei dies after sustaining burns from a petrol attack by her partner in Kenya almost a month after her participation in the women's marathon at the 2024 Summer Olympics. Her partner also dies from injuries sustained in the attack on 9 September.

=== October ===
- 22 October – A fuel truck overturns and explodes while passersby try to collect its contents in Kigogwa, killing 11 people.
- 25 October – The High Court convicts former Lord's Resistance Army commander Thomas Kwoyelo of war crimes committed during the group's insurgency and sentences him to 40 years' imprisonment.
- 29 October – Eight people are killed in an attack by suspected cult members on the village of Mizizi A in Kagadi District.
- 30 October – Three children are found beheaded in Kiryandongo.

=== November ===
- 2 November – Fourteen people are killed in a lightning strike during a church service in Palabek Refugee Settlement.
- 20 November – Opposition politician Kizza Besigye appears in a court martial in Kampala after reportedly being abducted in Kenya on 16 November.
- 27 November – At least 20 people are killed while 113 others are reported missing in landslides in Bulambuli District.

== Deaths ==
- 18 January – Cecilia Ogwal, 77, politician, MP (since 1996)

== See also ==
- International Conference on the Great Lakes Region
