= Judyth Nsababera =

Ugandan advocate, nonprofit founder, diplomat

- Born: Judyth Nsababera
- Citizenship: Ugandan
- Occupations: Diplomat, presidential adviser, public health advocate, film producer
- Years active: 2005–present
- Employer: Government of Uganda
- Organization: About Face Films
- Known for: Advocacy for women in peacekeeping, Uganda–China relations, Project Hope for Africa
- Notable work: Back to the Source: The Nile
- Title: Consul General of Uganda in Guangzhou

Judyth Nsababera also known as 'Juju' is a Ugandan diplomat, presidential adviser, public health advocate, and film producer. She serves as Uganda's Consul General in Guangzhou, China, and as Senior Presidential Advisor on Regional Matters to the President of Uganda.

== Early life and education ==
Judyth Nsababera was raised in Rwanda and Uganda during periods of political instability and regional conflict. Her mother served as a Senior Superintendent of Police in Uganda, influencing her views on women in leadership and public service. She later moved to the United States of America, where she studied public health and organizational psychology. Her studies contributed to her later work in public policy, diplomacy, and humanitarian advocacy.

== Career ==
She is an advocate for women in peacekeeping and leadership, as well as for promoting Uganda through cultural diplomacy, film, and international engagement. She is also the founder of About Face Films, a media company highlighting women in leadership and peace and security roles.

In 2025, Nsababera led a documentary Back to the Source: The Nile, a documentary directed by Derrick Ssenyonyi that follows her journey across Uganda while exploring personal fears, culture, and tourism. The film was created to promote Uganda to international audiences through storytelling and featured locations such as Jinja, Bwindi, Murchison Falls, and Sipi Falls. The documentary premiered in Guangzhou, China, in 2025 and later in Kampala in 2026. A community screening in Katanga, Kampala, attended by more than 700 people, was organized to make the film accessible to local audiences.

== See also ==
- Bwindi Impenetrable National Park
- Murchison Falls National Park
- Sipi Falls
- Guangzhou
- Uganda–China relations
- Women in diplomacy
