= Ten Point Program =

Ten Point Program may refer to:

- Ten-Point Program (Black Panther Party) (1966), a set of guidelines to the Black Panther Party
- PLO's Ten Point Program (1974), a plan accepted by the Palestinian National Council for the liberation of Palestinian territory
- Ten Point Programme for Reunification of the Country (1993), a plan written by Kim Il-sung to re-unite North Korea and South Korea
- Ten-Point Program of the National Resistance Movement (1986); see Economic history of Uganda
- Helmut Kohl's ten-point program (1989); see German reunification
- Iran's Ten Point plan for a peace agreement, as part of the 2026 Iran war ceasefire
