= Fred Bwino Kyakulaga =

Ugandan politician

Fredrick Bwino Kyagulaga
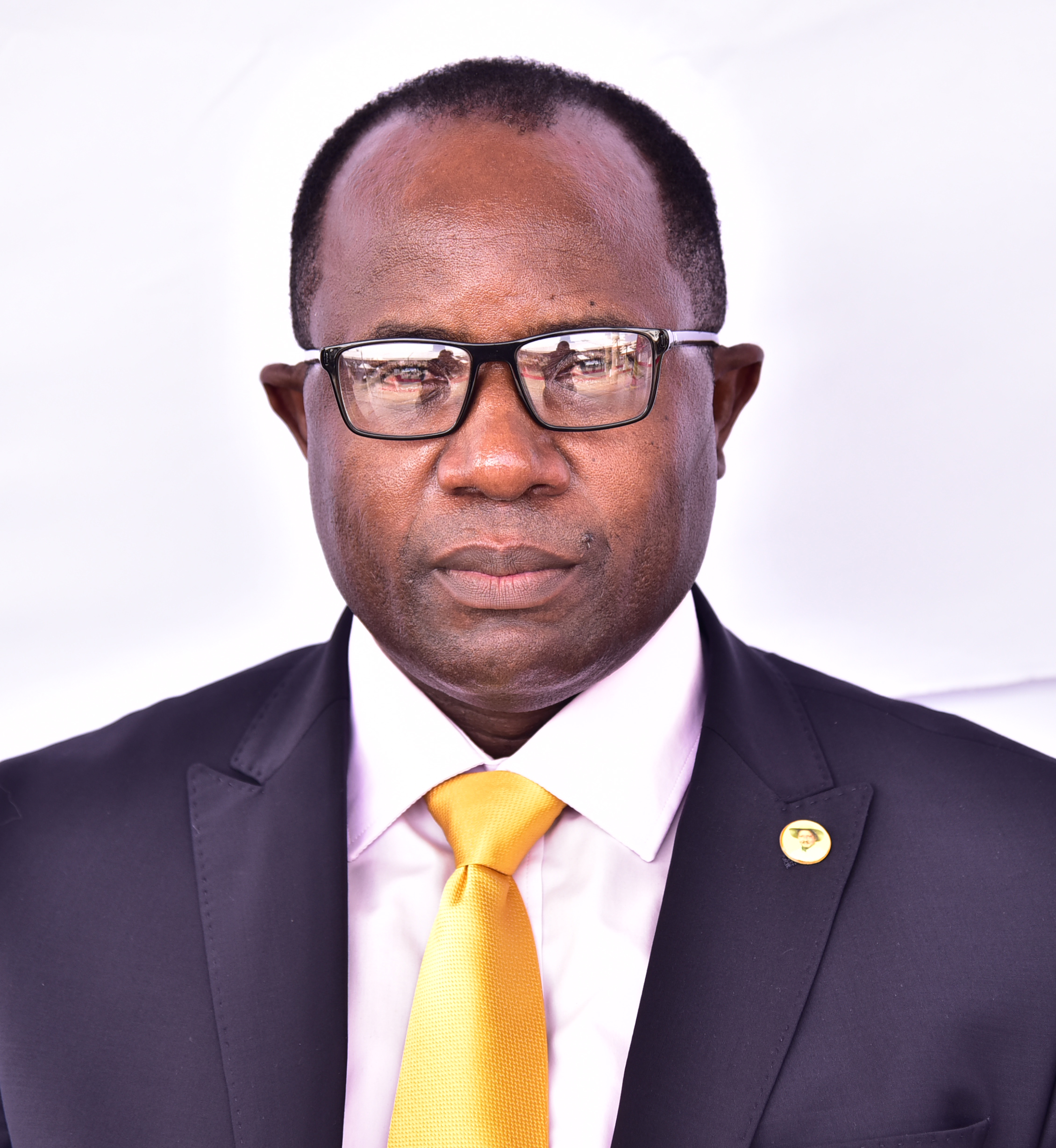
- Born: June 22, 1964 (age 62); Iganga District
- Citizenship: Uganda
- Education: Makerere University Uganda Management Institute
- Occupations: Microbiologist and Politician
- Title: State Minister for Agriculture, Animal Industry, and Fisheries
- Political party: National Resistance Movement

Fred Bwino Kyakulaga also known as Fredrick Bwino Kyakulaga (born June 22, 1964) is a Ugandan microbiologist and politician currently serving as the State Minister for Agriculture, Animal Industry, and Fisheries. He is also the elected Member of Parliament for Kigulu North in Iganga District on National Resistance Movement ticket.

== Education background ==
Fred Bwino Kyakulaga was born on June 22, 1964, in Kigulu, Iganga District.

Fred Holds a Phd in Public Administration from the Uganda Management Institute, MA in Procurement from Makerere University and currently doing his Phd in Agricultural Research in Plant Pathology Microbiology.

== Career ==
=== Current government positions (2021–2025) ===
Appointed by President Yoweri Museveni in June 2021 as State Minister for Agriculture, Animal Industry and Fisheries, he specifically oversees the crop sub-sector.

In late 2025, he led the transition from a sectoral to a programmatic approach to enhance value addition and economic growth through Agro-Industrialization and he announced measures to safeguard the vanilla harvest and curb theft to protect the high-value commodity.

In December 2025, he launched regional coffee profiles for Uganda to boost global market competitiveness.

He has spearheaded initiatives to increase food production by partnering with the Uganda Prisons Service to use idle land for large-scale farming.

He represents the Kigulu North constituency in Iganga District for the 11th Parliament (2021–2026) under the National Resistance Movement (NRM) party.

=== Past professional experience ===
During the 10th Parliament (2016–2021), he served for five years in leadership roles on the Parliamentary Committee on Science, Technology, and Innovation. For 10 years, he worked as a lecturer in Plant Pathology and Microbiology at the Islamic University in Uganda (IUIU). He is a retired Major (Maj Rtd) of the Uganda People's Defence Forces (UPDF)

=== Specialization ===
He applies his scientific training to agricultural policy, focusing on pest and disease control, quality seed provision, and soil health i.e. Microbiology and Agronomy.

In 2021, he was elected to lead the ministerial coordination committee of the Busoga Consortium to promote development in the Busoga region.

== Personal life and family ==
His mother, Mrs. Faith Mary Kasura, passed away on November 23, 2025. He described her as a great mentor and a blessing to many.

He has at least one daughter named Fiona. On his 60th birthday Fiona gave birth to his grandson, Elijah, a coincidence he described as "double blessings". While he has made metaphorical references to "marriages" between government sectors, he generally keeps the identity and details of his spouse out of the public spotlight.

== See also ==
- List of Government Ministries of Uganda
- List of Members of the Eleventh Parliament of Uganda
- List of Members of the Tenth Parliament of Uganda
