= Kabango =

Kabango is a surname commonly present in Central and East Africa. Notable people with this surname include:

- Michael Kabango, Ugandan brigadier
- Shadrach Kabango (born 1982), or Shad, Kenyan-born Canadian rapper and broadcaster
