= Luyimbazi Elias Nalukoola =

Ugandan politician (born 1980)

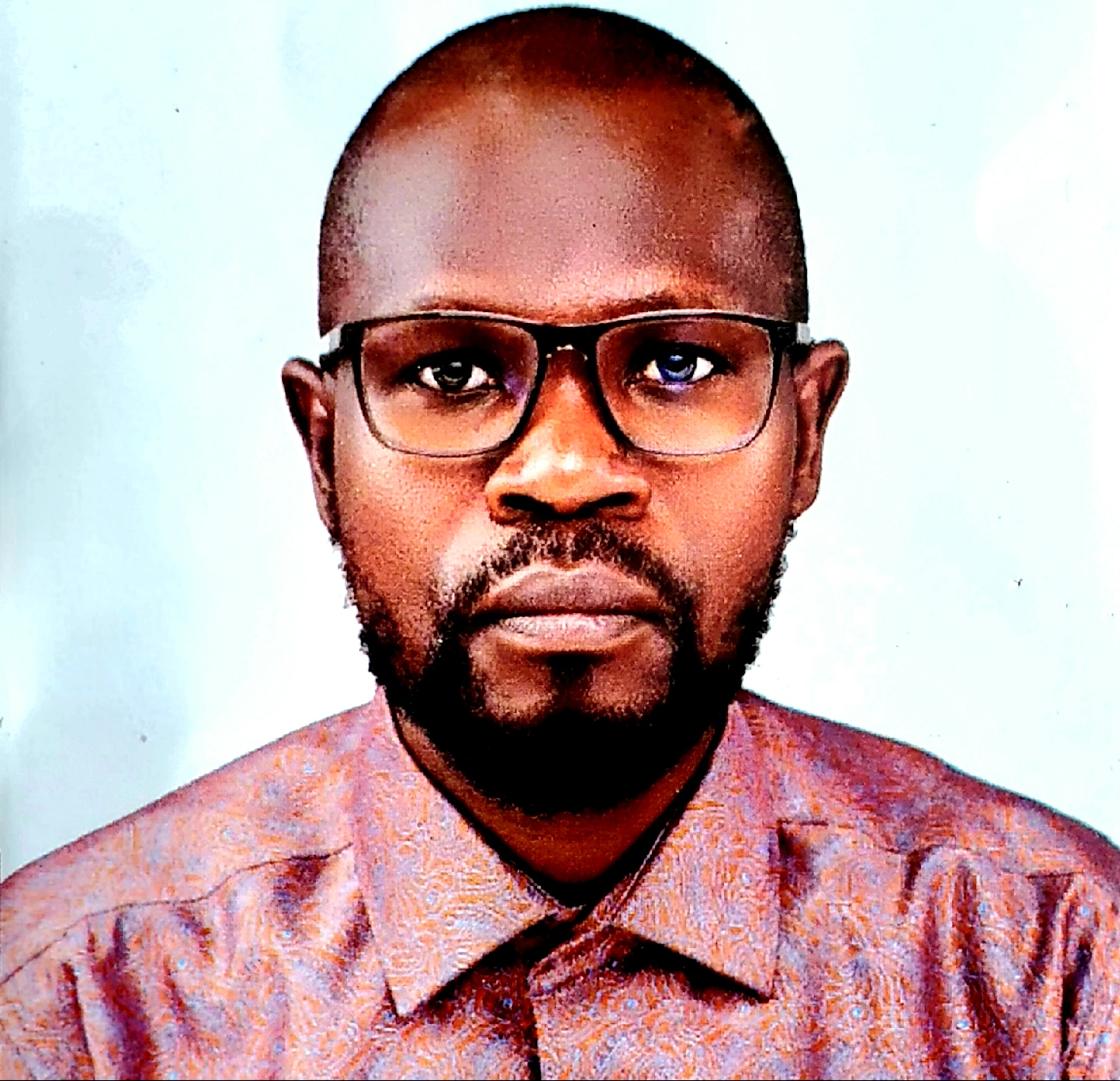

Former Member of Parliament for Kawempe North
- In office March 13, 2025 – May 26, 2025
- Preceded by: Muhammad Ssegirinya

Personal details
- Born: 1980 (age 45–46) Uganda
- Party: National Unity Platform (NUP)
- Other political affiliations: Democratic Party (Uganda) (former)
- Education: Makerere University (LL.B); Law Development Centre (Diploma in Legal Practice)
- Occupation: Lawyer, politician
- Profession: Lawyer
- Known for: Politics, human rights advocacy, constitutional law
- Website: nalukoola.com

Luyimbazi Elias Nalukoola is a Ugandan lawyer, and politician. He served as the Member of Parliament for Kawempe North Constituency in Kampala from 13 March to 26 May 2025, after Justice Namanya Bernard nullified the election, declaring the position vacant.

He assumed office after being declared the winner of the by-election by the electoral commission with 17,764 votes on March 13, 2025 held after the death of the former MP, Muhammad Ssegirinya, in January 2025.

In January 2026, Nalukoola was re-elected as Member of Parliament for Kawempe North following the 2026 general elections.

== Early life and education ==
Elias Nalukoola went to Kawempe Islamic School, Kyerima Umea Primary School, and Kawempe Muslim Primary School for his primary school education. He joined St. Paul SS Mpererwe, then Kawempe Muslim Secondary School for his A-Level. He attained his law degree from Makerere University and a postgraduate diploma in legal practice from the Law Development Centre (LDC).

Nalukoola began his legal career in 2014 with Mayanja, Nakibuule and Co. Advocates as a legal assistant before establishing his own private practice.

== Legal career ==
Nalukoola gained recognition as a human rights advocate for his courageous and eloquent defense of marginalized communities. His legal practice focuses on human rights and constitutional law, civil litigation, commercial and land transactions. He has participated in numerous cases, including arguments before the Ugandan Supreme Court. He was part of the legal team that challenged the amendment of Article 102(b) of the Ugandan Constitution, which removed the age limit cap for presidential candidates. He has also been instrumental in defending Muslim suspects accused of involvement in the murders of Muslim clerics.

== Political career ==
Prior to his parliamentary role, Nalukoola served as the Deputy Speaker of Kawempe Division in 2006 to 2011. He also held the position of National Legal Advisor for the Democratic Party (DP) in Uganda, a position he resigned from in 2023 before becoming an advisor to the Uganda Journalists Association (UJA).

In February 2025, he was nominated by the National Unity Platform (NUP) as their candidate for the Kawempe North by-election, following the death of MP Muhammad Ssegirinya. During his nomination process, Nalukoola faced challenges, including alleged abduction of his aide and interference by security operatives. Despite these obstacles, he secured his nomination and subsequently won the by-election on March 13, 2025 against nine other contestants (including Nambi Faridah Kigongo [NRM], Hanifah Karadi Murerwa [Independent], Sadat Mukiibi aka Kalifa Aganaga [FDC], and Henry Mubiru Kasacca [DP]).

In the 2026 general elections, Nalukoola was declared the winner of the Kawempe North parliamentary seat. The announcement followed delays at the tally centre amid tensions between supporters of rival candidates. According to media reports, the returning officer later confirmed the results, after which the Electoral Commission formally announced him as the duly elected Member of Parliament for the constituency.

== Personal life ==
Nalukoola is known for his commitment to human rights and justice. He co-founded Nalukoola, Kakeeto Advocates & Solicitors. He serves as a board member of the Buganda Cultural and Development Foundation (BUCADEF). He also participates in various school boards and engages in motivational speaking. He also organized Nalukoola Kawempe North Sports Tournament 2024-2025, which kicked off on 22 December 2024.

== Controversies ==
Nalukoola filed a lawsuit against the Ugandan government in March 2025, claiming that he was tortured by operatives of the Joint Anti-Terrorism Taskforce (JATT) during his nomination process. He is pursuing compensation and a public apology, claiming that his rights to dignity and freedom from torture were infringed upon.

According to Section 59 of the Parliamentary Elections Act, 2005, which states that after the election, the Electoral Commission shall declare in writing and publish the result within 48 hours after the close of polling. Nalukoola's path to becoming a member of Parliament was more complex, because the Electoral Commission could not seem to complete the process of officially publishing his name after his clear victory.

Even though he was declared winner, and the commission eventually announced him the winner within 18 hours after the polling stations had closed down, the important step of adding his name in the National Gazette still remained incomplete. This administrative issue prevented him from being able to move forward with the swearing-in ceremony. The situation led Nalukoola and some other National Unity Platform (NUP) representatives to confront the Electoral Commission, in what ended up becoming a protest meeting, as they tried to figure out why there was such an unusual delay in what should have been a much more straightforward process.

On March 20, 2025, National Resistance Movement (NRM) candidate in the Kawempe North by-election, Faridah Nambi, through her lawyers Atwijukire Dennis Advocates, filled a petition to the Kawempe chief magistrate seeking a vote recount which she withdrew on March 25, 2025 after the Electoral Commission had gazetted the results with Nalukoola as the winner.

Nalukoola was finally sworn in as the Member of Parliament for Kawempe North in the 11th Parliament of Uganda on March 26, 2025. The swearing-in ceremony was conducted by Speaker Anita Among in her chambers, as Parliament was in recess at the time. This was after she received official communication from the Electoral Commission along with a copy of the gazetted results. The court of appeal gave Nalukoola until October 3, 2025 to compile his notes in the case with Faridah Nambi that seeks to nulify his parliamentary success in the Kawempe North constituency.
