= Ssenyonyi =

Ssenyonyi is a surname. Notable people with the surname include:

- Derrick Ssenyonyi (fl. from 2015), Ugandan photographer
- Joel Ssenyonyi (born 1986), Ugandan journalist, lawyer and politician
