= Margaret Baba Diri =

Ugandan politician (1954–2025)

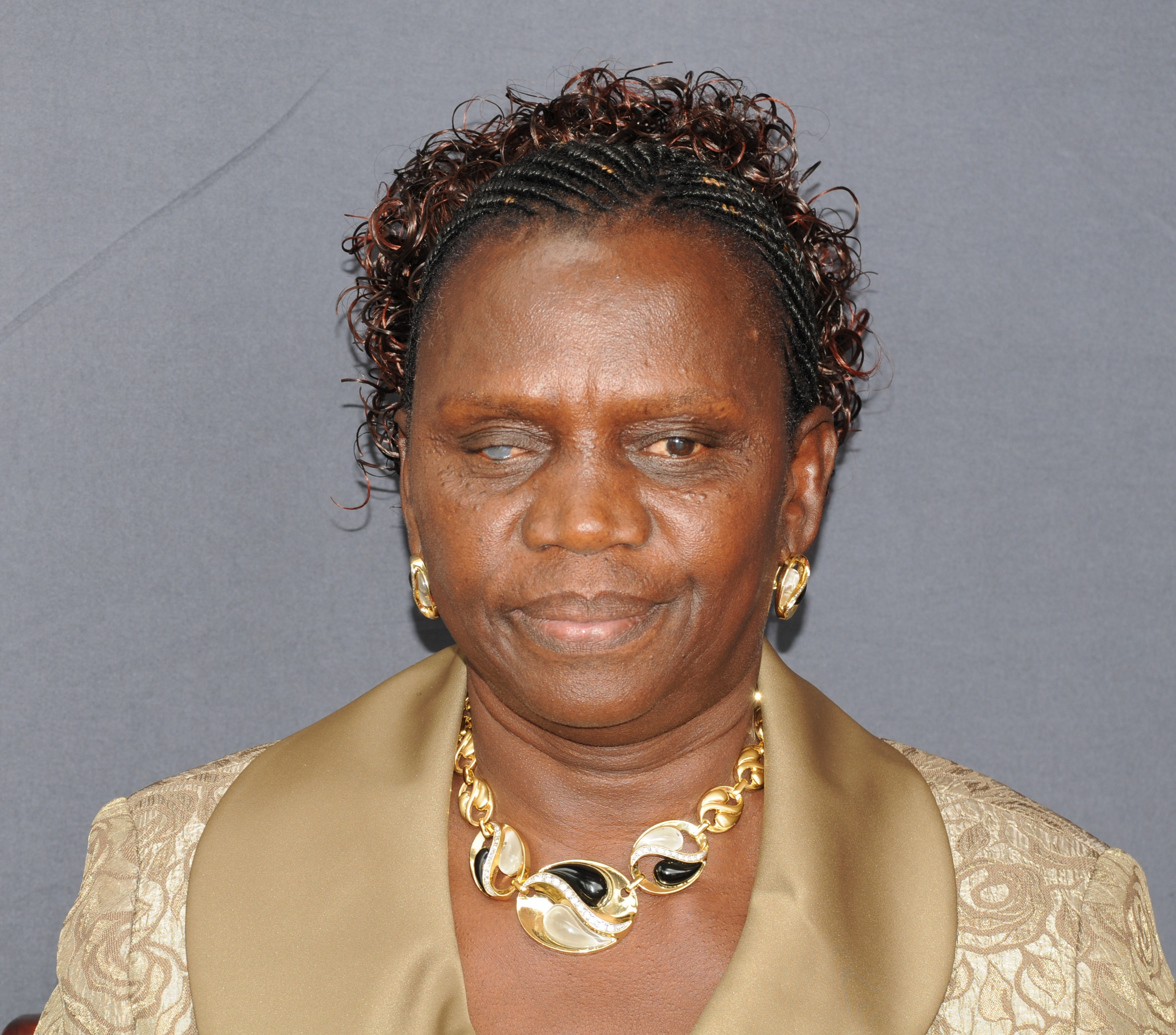
- Born: 29 June 1954
- Died: 9 January 2025 (aged 70)
- Education: National Teachers College Kyambogo; Kyambogo University
- Occupations: Teacher; Politician
- Employer(s): St. Charles Lwanga Koboko; National Union of Disabled Persons of Uganda (NUDIPU); Parliament of Uganda
- Known for: Politics

Margaret Baba Diri (29 June 1954 – 9 January 2025) was an Ugandan politician, teacher and activist. She was visually impaired and was first elected to the Ugandan Parliament as a representative of people with disabilities in 1996. Prior to entering politics she worked as a teacher at St. Charles Lwanga in Koboko between 1976 and 1990 and also as a gender development officer at National Union of Disabled Persons of Uganda (NUDIPU) between 1992 and 1996.

== Early life and education ==
Margaret Baba Diri was born on 29 June 1954. She held a Diploma in Education from the National Teachers College Kyambogo. She also obtained a Bachelor in Adult and Community Education from Kyambogo University.

== Career ==
Margaret Baba Diri started her career as a teacher at St. Charles Lwanga Koboko between 1976 and 1990 and as a gender development officer at the National Union of Disabled Persons of Uganda (NUDIPU) between 1992 and 1996.

She later entered politics as a representative of persons with disabilities. She was in Parliament for five terms from 1996 during which she also represented Koboko as a Woman MP. Diri was a member of the Parliamentary Committee on Commissions, State Authorities and State Enterprises and Education and Sports.

== Personal life and death ==
Diri was a widow. She died on 9 January 2025, shortly after the confirmation of MP Muhammad Ssegirinya's death. Diri was 70.

== See also ==
- Parliament of Uganda
