= Hudson Mukasa =

Ugandan general

Major General Hudson Mukasa
- Born: 1963 (age 62–63); Uganda
- Citizenship: Uganda
- Education: Tanzania Military Academy; Ghana Military Academy; National Defence College, Kenya
- Occupation: Military officer
- Years active: 1983 - present
- Known for: Military matters
- Title: Military Attaché to Uganda's Embassy to Kenya

Hudson Mukasa is a Major General in the Uganda People's Defence Forces (UPDF). Since June 2016, he has been the Military Attaché to Uganda's Embassy to Kenya, based in Nairobi. Before that he served as the Military Attaché at Uganda's Embassy to Burundi, based in Bujumbura.

== Background and education ==
He was born in the Buganda Region of Uganda in the 1963. He attended the military cadet course at the Tanzania Military Academy, in Monduli, in the late 1980s. He then attended a Senior Staff and Command course in the early 1990s, in Ghana. He has also graduated from the National Strategic Studies Course, at the National Defence College, Kenya.

== Military career ==
Mukasa joined the National Resistance Army, the precursor to the Uganda People's Defence Forces, in 1983. He has served in various command roles in the UPDF, including as the Commander of the 2nd UPDF Division, based at Makenke, in Mbarara, in the Western Region of Uganda, from 2005 until 2008. He then commanded the 5th UPDF Division, in 2008. At that time the 5th Division was based in Lira, Lango sub-region, in Uganda's Northern Region.

He has also previously served as the Second Division operations and training officer. From 1997 to 2003, he was the 503 Brigade commander based in Kitgum, Northern Uganda. The brigade was one of the mobile forces the UPDF established to fight the Lord's Resistance Army, along the Sudan-Uganda border.

On 28 March 2020, he was promoted from the rank of Brigadier to Major General.

== Controversy ==
In 2008, while serving as he Commanding Officer of the 5th UPDF Division, based in Lira, Uganda, Brigadier Hudson Mukasa was implicated in the misappropriation of USh 256 million (approx. US$102,400 at that time), in salary arrears for men and women under his command.

He was suspended, together with five other military officers in his unit, while a military inquiry was conducted. Brigadier Mukasa mobilized personal resources and promptly refunded the money.

== See also ==
- Dick Olum
- David Muhoozi
- Michael Kabango
- Katumba Wamala
