= Rosemary Seninde =

Ugandan politician (born 1965)

Rosemary Nansubuga Seninde
- Born: 7 January 1965 (age 61); Uganda
- Citizenship: Uganda
- Education: Makerere University (Bachelor of Arts in Human Resources Management) (Master of Arts in Ethics & Public Management); Kyambogo University (Diploma in Education); Ndejje University (Certificate in Education)
- Occupations: Educator & Politician
- Years active: 1987 – present
- Title: Minister of State for Primary Education 2016-2021
- Spouse: Zephaniah Kizza Sseninde

Rosemary Nansubuga Seninde, also Rosemary Nansubuga Sseninde (née Rosemary Nansubuga) (born 7 January 1965), is a Ugandan educator and politician. She was the State Minister for Primary Education in the Ugandan Cabinet for five years. She was appointed to that position on 6 June 2016, replacing John Chrysostom Muyingo who became State Minister for Higher Education. She was succeeded by Joyce Moriku.

== Background and education ==
Rosemary Nansubuga was born in Wakiso District on 7 January 1965. She went to St. Agnes Boarding Primary School in Naggalama for her early elementary schooling. She undertook her O-Level studies at St. Joseph's Senior Secondary School in Nsambya, graduating in 1982. She then studied at Trinity College Nabbingo for her A-Level education, graduating in 1985.

In 1997 she obtained a Teaching Certificate from Lady Irene College, in Ndejje, now a component of Ndejje University. The following year, she attended a 10-week course at the National Institute of Small Industries Extension Training (NISIET) in Hyderabad, India, graduating with a certificate. In 2001, she graduated with a Diploma in Education, awarded by the Institute of Teacher Education (ITEK), now a component of Kyambogo University. In 2005, she graduated with a Bachelor of Arts in Human Resource Management from Makerere University. Later in 2009, she was awarded a Master of Arts in Ethics and Public Management.

== Teaching career ==
She began her teaching career in 1987 as a teacher/instructor at a boarding elementary school until 1994. She then transferred to Wampeewo Senior Secondary School as a teacher, serving in that capacity until 2000. In 2001, for less than one year, she worked as a tutor/instructor at Shimoni Teacher Training College.

== Politics ==
In 2001, she entered elective Ugandan politics and was elected to the Parliament of Uganda to represent the women of Wakiso District. She was reelected in 2006, 2011 and 2016, and is the incumbent. In the cabinet appointed on 6 June 2016, she was named the State Minister for Primary Education.

She served as the Wakiso District Women's Representative in the Parliament of Uganda from 2016 to 2021.

After the 2021 election, she became the NRM Director of Mobilisation.

== Personal life ==
Rosemary Nansubuga Sseninde is married to Zephaniah Kizza Kikoba Walube Sseninde since 12 October 1985. She is the mother of seven children. Her daughter, Jean Sseninde, is a business woman and former professorial soccer player for Uganda and Queens Park Rangers W.F.C. in England.

== See also ==
- Cabinet of Uganda
- Parliament of Uganda
- Faridah Nambi
