= Economic history of Uganda =

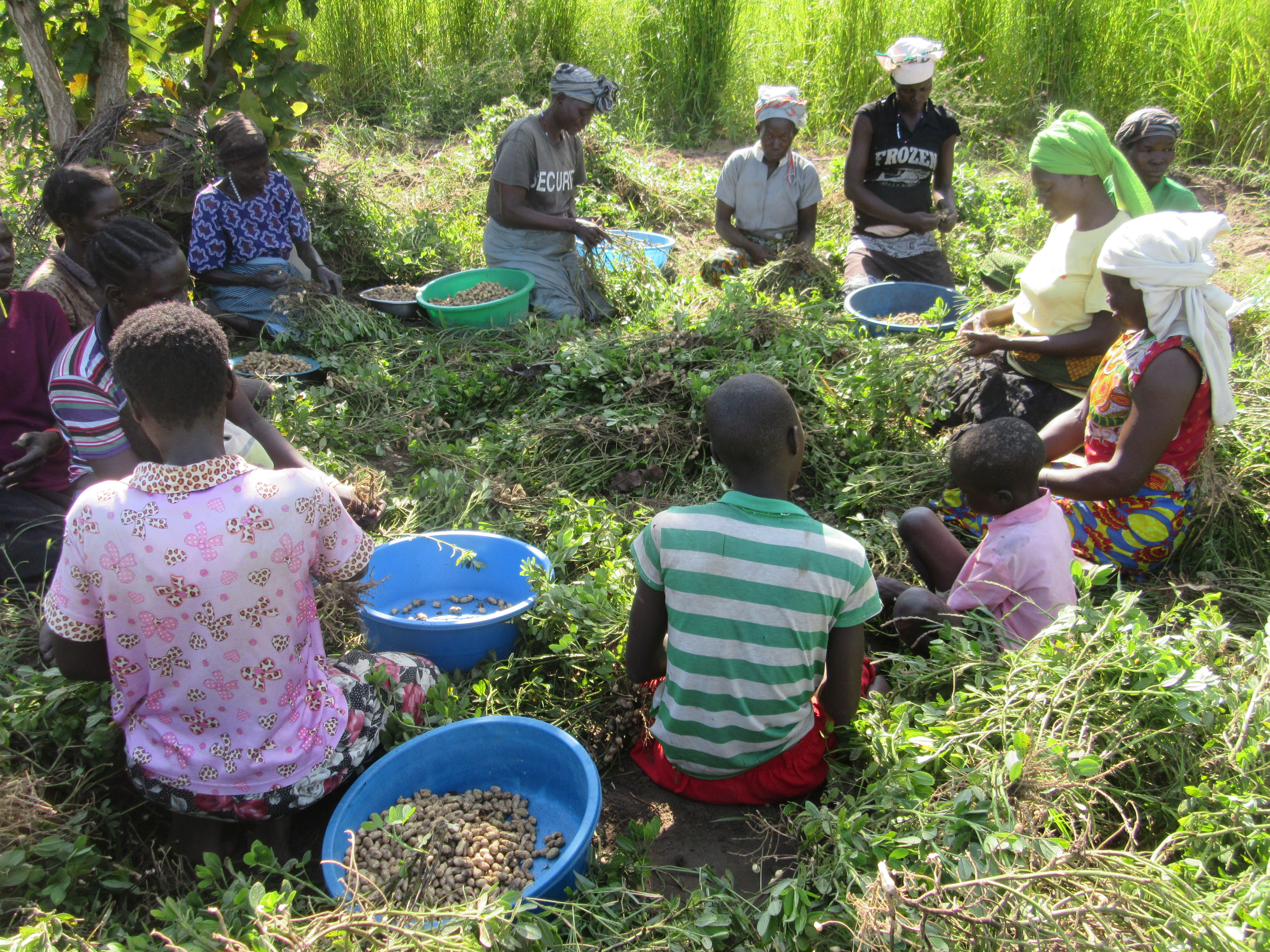
A group of women harvesting peanuts (groundnuts) in 2017

Since precolonial times, Peasant agricultural production has been the predominant economic activity in the landlocked country of Uganda in East Africa. Despite an active trade in ivory and animal hides linking Uganda with the east coast of Africa long before the arrival of Europeans, most Ugandans were subsistence farmers.

After declaring Uganda a protectorate in 1893, Britain pursued economic policies that drew Uganda into the world economy primarily to serve Britain's late-19th-century textile industry. Cotton cultivation increased in importance after 1904, and once it became clear that cotton plantations would be too difficult and expensive to maintain, official policy encouraged smallholder farmers to produce and market their cotton through local cooperative associations.

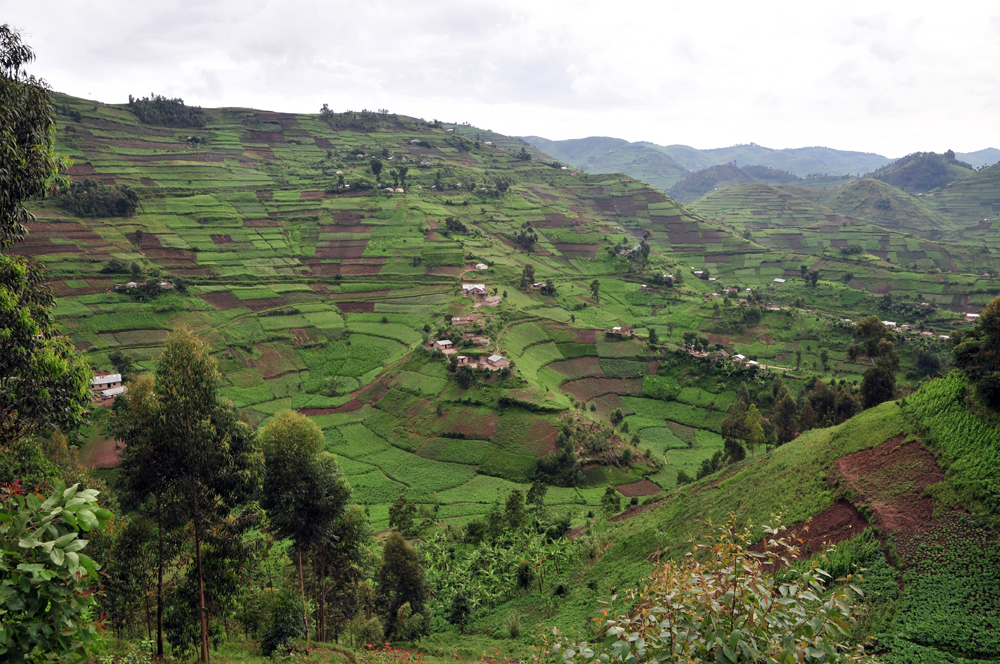
Coffee fields in southwestern Uganda

By 1910 cotton had become Uganda's leading export. In the following decades, the government encouraged the growth of sugar and tea plantations. Following World War II, officials introduced coffee cultivation to bolster declining export revenues, and coffee soon earned more than half of Uganda's export earnings. When coffee replaced cotton as Uganda's principal export in the 1950s, it was still produced in the pattern of small peasant holdings and local marketing associations that had arisen early in the century.

The economy registered substantial growth, but almost all real growth was in agriculture, centered in the southern provinces. The fledgling industrial sector, which emphasized food processing for export, also increased its contribution as a result of the expansion of agriculture.

Growth slowed in the late 1950s, as fluctuating world market conditions reduced export earnings and Uganda experienced the political pressures of growing nationalist movements that swept much of Africa. Uganda enjoyed a strong and stable economy in the years approaching independence. Agriculture was the dominant activity, but the expanding manufacturing sector appeared capable of increasing its contribution to gross domestic product (GDP), especially through the production of foodstuffs and textiles. Some valuable minerals, notably copper, had been discovered, and water power resources were substantial.

Since 1990 the Ugandan economy has shown more growth; real gross domestic product (GDP) grew at an average of 6.7% annually during the period 1990–2015, whereas real GDP per capita grew at 3.3% per annum during the same period. Over the same period the share of agriculture value added in GDP declined from 56% in 1990 to 24% in 2015; the share of industry grew from 11% to 20% (with manufacturing increasing at a slower pace, from 6% to 9% of GDP); and the share of services went from 32% to 55%.

== 1962-1971 ==
For the first five years following independence in 1962, Uganda's economy resumed rapid growth, with GDP, including subsistence agriculture, expanding approximately 6.7 percent per year. Even with population growth estimated at 2.5 percent per year, net economic growth of more than 4 percent suggested that people's lives were improving. In 1967 Uganda and the neighboring countries of Kenya and Tanzania joined to form the East African Community (EAC), hoping to create a common market and share the cost of transport and banking facilities, and Uganda registered impressive growth rates for the first eight years after independence. By the end of the 1960s, commercial agriculture accounted for more than one-third of GDP. Industrial output had increased to nearly 9 percent of GDP, primarily the result of new food-processing industries. Tourism, transportation, telecommunications, and wholesale and retail trade still contributed nearly one-half of total output.

== 1971-1979 ==
The economy deteriorated under the rule of President Idi Amin Dada from 1971 to 1979. Amin used nationalist, militarist rhetoric and ill-chosen economic policies to eliminate foreign economic interests and build up the military establishment. In 1972 he expelled holders of British passports, including approximately 70,000 Asians of Indian and Pakistani descent. Many Asians had been active in agribusiness, manufacturing, and commerce. Their mass expulsion and Amin's efforts to expropriate foreign businesses undermined investor confidence in Uganda. Amin also increased public expenditures on military goods, a practice that contributed to escalating foreign and domestic debt during the 1970s. Relations with Uganda's neighbors soured, the EAC disbanded in 1977, and Tanzanian troops finally led a joint effort to overthrow the unpopular Amin regime in 1979. By 1980 the economy was nearly destroyed.

Although the government envisioned annual economic growth rates of about 5.6 percent in the early 1970s, war and political instability almost destroyed Uganda's once promising economy. GDP declined each year from 1972 to 1976 and registered only slight improvement in 1977 when world coffee prices increased. Negative growth resumed, largely because the government continued to expropriate business assets. Foreign investments, too, declined sharply, as President Idi Amin's erratic policies destroyed almost all but the subsistence sector of the economy.

The economic and political destruction of the Amin years contributed to a record decline in earnings by 14.8 percent between 1978 and 1980. When Amin fled from Uganda in 1979, the nation's GDP measured only 80 percent of the 1970 level. Industrial output declined sharply, as equipment, spare parts, and raw materials became scarce. From 1981 to 1983, the country experienced a welcome 17.3 percent growth rate, but most of this success occurred in the agricultural sector. Little progress was made in manufacturing and other productive sectors. Renewed political crisis led to negative growth rates of 4.2 percent in 1984, 1.5 percent in 1985, and 2.3 percent in 1986.

Throughout these years of political uncertainty, coffee production by smallholders—the pattern developed under British rule—continued to dominate the economy, providing the best hope for national recovery and economic development. As international coffee prices fluctuated, however, Uganda's overall GDP suffered despite consistent production.

== 1979-1990 ==
Uganda escaped widespread famine in the late 1970s and 1980s only because many people, even urban residents, reverted to subsistence cultivation in order to survive. Both commercial and subsistence farming operated in the monetary and nonmonetary (barter) sectors, and the latter presented the government with formidable problems of organization and taxation. By the late 1980s, government reports estimated that approximately 44 percent of GDP originated outside the monetary economy. Most (over 90 percent) of nonmonetary economic activity was agricultural, and it was the resilience of this sector that ensured survival for most Ugandans.

Following Amin's departure, successive governments attempted to restore international confidence in the economy through a mixture of development plans and austere government budgets. Beginning in 1980, the second government of Milton Obote obtained foreign donor support, primarily from the International Monetary Fund, by floating the Uganda shilling, removing price controls, increasing agricultural producer prices, and setting strict limits on government expenditures. In addition, Obote tried to persuade foreign companies to return to their former premises, which had been nationalized under Amin. These recovery initiatives created real growth in agriculture between 1980 and 1983. The lack of foreign exchange was a major constraint on government efforts, however, and it became a critical problem in 1984 when the IMF ended its support following a disagreement over budget policy. During the brief regime of Tito Lutwa Okello in 1985, the economy slipped almost out of control as civil war extended across the country.

In 1986 the newly established Museveni regime committed itself to reversing the economic disintegration of the 1970s and 1980s. Museveni proclaimed the national economic orientation to be toward private enterprise rather than socialist government control.

After seizing power in January 1986, the new National Resistance Movement (NRM) government published a political manifesto that had been drawn up when the NRM was an army of antigovernment rebels. Several points in the Ten-Point Program emphasized the importance of economic development, declaring that an independent, self-sustaining national economy was vital to protect Uganda's interests. The manifesto also set out specific goals for achieving this self-sufficiency: diversifying agricultural exports and developing industries that used local raw materials to manufacture products necessary for development. The Ten-Point Program also set out other economic goals: to improve basic social services, such as water, health care, and housing; to improve literacy skills nationwide; to eliminate corruption, especially in government; to return expropriated land to its rightful Ugandan owners; to raise public-sector salaries; to strengthen regional ties and develop markets among East African nations; and to maintain a mixed economy combining private ownership with an active government sector.

The NRM government proposed a major Rehabilitation and Development Plan (RDP) for fiscal years 1987-88 through 1990–91, with IMF support; it then devalued the shilling and committed itself to budgetary restraint. The four-year plan set out primarily to stabilize the economy and promote economic growth. More specific goals were to reduce Uganda's dependence on external assistance, diversify agricultural exports, and encourage the growth of the private sector through new credit policies.

Setting these priorities helped improve Uganda's credentials with international aid organizations and donor countries of the West, but in the first three years of Museveni's rule, coffee production remained the only economic activity inside Uganda to display consistent growth and resilience.

In 1987 GDP rose 4.5 percent above the 1986 level. This rise marked Uganda's first sign of economic growth in four years, as security improved in the south and west and factories increased production after years of stagnation. This modest rate of growth increased in 1988, when GDP expansion measured 7.2 percent, with substantial improvements in the manufacturing sector. In 1989 falling world market prices for coffee reduced growth to 6.6 percent, and a further decline to 3.4 percent growth occurred in 1990, in part because of drought, low coffee prices, and a decline in manufacturing output.

Many government policies were aimed at restoring the confidence of the private sector. In the absence of private initiatives, however, the government took over many abandoned or formerly expropriated companies and formed new parastatal enterprises. In an effort to bring a measure of financial stability to the country and attract some much-needed foreign assistance in 1987, it also initiated an ambitious RDP aimed at rebuilding the economic and social infrastructure. Officials then offered to sell several of the largest parastatals to private investors, but political and personal rivalries hampered efforts toward privatization throughout 1988 and 1989.

By 1987 the Ugandan government was directly involved in the economy through four institutions. First, it owned a number of parastatals that had operated as private companies before being abandoned by their owners or expropriated by the government. Second, the government operated marketing boards to monitor sales and regulate prices for agricultural producers. Third, the government owned the country's major banks, including the Bank of Uganda and Uganda Commercial Bank. And fourth, the government controlled all imports and exports through licensing procedures.

By the 1980s, more than 3,500 primary marketing cooperative societies serviced most of Uganda's small-scale farmers. These cooperatives purchased crops for marketing and export, and they distributed consumer goods and agricultural inputs, such as seeds and fertilizers. Prices paid by marketing boards for commodities such as coffee, tea, and cotton were fairly stable but often artificially low, and payments were sometimes delayed until several weeks after purchases. Moreover, farmers sometimes complained that marketing boards applied inconsistent standards of quality and that weights and measurements of produce were sometimes faulty. In 1989 the government was attempting to reduce expensive and inefficient intermediary activity in crop marketing, and Museveni urged producers to report buyers who failed to pay for commodities when they were received.

In July 1988, officials announced that they would sell 22 companies that were entirely or partially government-owned, in an effort to trim government costs and curb runaway inflation. These enterprises included textile mills, vehicle import companies, and iron and gold mines. Officials hoped to sell some of them to private owners and to undertake joint ventures with private companies to continue operating several others. Among the roughly sixty parastatals that would remain in operation after 1989 were several in which the government planned to continue as the sole or majority shareholder. These parastatals included the electric power company, railroads and airlines, and cement and steel manufacturers. Banking and export-import licensing would remain in government hands, along with a substantial number of the nation's hotels. Retail trade would be managed almost entirely by the private sector. By late 1989, however, efforts to privatize parastatal organizations had just begun, as personal and political rivalries delayed the sale of several lucrative corporations. The International Development Association awarded Uganda US$16 million to help improve the efficiency of government-owned enterprises. Funds allocated through this Public Enterprise Project would be used to pay for consultancy services and supplies and to commission a study of ways to reform public-sector administration.

In Museveni's first three years in office, the role of government bureaucrats in economic planning gave rise to charges of official corruption. A 1988 audit accused government ministries and other departments of fraudulently appropriating nearly 20 percent of the national budget. The audit cited the Office of the President, the Ministry of Defence, and the Ministry of Education. Education officials, in particular, were accused of paying salaries for fictitious teachers and paying labor and material costs for nonexistent building projects. In order to set a public example in 1989, Museveni dismissed several high-level officials, including cabinet ministers, who were accused of embezzling or misusing government funds.

When coffee-producing nations failed to reach an agreement on prices for coffee exports in 1989, Uganda faced devastating losses in export earnings and sought increased international assistance to stave off economic collapse.

== 1990-present ==
The economy has grown since the 1990s; real gross domestic product (GDP) grew at an average of 6.7% annually during the period 1990–2015, whereas real GDP per capita grew at 3.3% per annum during the same period. During this period, the Ugandan economy experienced economic transformation: the share of agriculture value added in GDP declined from 56% in 1990 to 24% in 2015; the share of industry grew from 11% to 20% (with manufacturing increasing at a slower pace, from 6% to 9% of GDP); and the share of services went from 32% to 55%.

== Works cited ==
- Clark, Nancy (1992). "The Economy". In Byrnes, Rita M. (ed.). Uganda: a country study (2nd ed.). Washington, D.C.: Federal Research Division, Library of Congress. ISBN 0-8444-0749-6. OCLC 25831693. This article incorporates text from this source, which is in the public domain.
