= Johnson Byabashaija =

Ugandan Canon and Veterinary doctor

Canon. Dr. Johnson Omuhunde Rwashote Byabashaija
- Born: 27 September 1957 (age 69); Kajumiro village Nyakishenyi sub-county, Rubabo county, Rukungiri District
- Citizenship: Ugandan
- Education: Nyakishenyi Primary School, Kamwezi Primary School and Mukyayi Primary School, Mutorere Secondary School, Makerere College School, Makerere University Veterinary School
- Occupations: Veterinary Doctor, Prisons Officer
- Years active: 1982-Date
- Employer: Uganda Prison Service
- Title: Commissioner General
- Predecessor: Mr. Joseph A.A. Etima
- Spouse: Mrs. Byabashaija Janipher
- Parents: late Gregory Rwanshote (father); Late Cecilia Rwanshote (mother)

Canon. Dr. Johnson Omuhunde Rwashote Byabashaija (born 27 September 1957) also known as Johnson Byabashaija is a Ugandan Canon and Veterinary doctor who is the Commissioner General of Prisons in Uganda since 2005. Byabashaija was appointed a Lay Canon in the Church of Uganda North Kigezi.

== Education and Background ==
Byabashaija was born in Kajumiro village Nyakishenyi sub-county, Rubabo county, Rukungiri District to the late Gregory Rwanshote (father) and late Cecilia Rwanshote (mother). Byabashaija is the first-born of seven children in a family of three boys and four girls.

He started his education from Nyakishenyi Primary School, Kamwezi Primary School and Mukyayi Primary School for his primary education before joining Mutorere Secondary School in Kisoro district for O-level education and this was where he met the former Inspector General of Police Gen Kale Kayihura. Byabashaija then joined Makerere College School for his A-Level education. He offered Physics, Chemistry, Biology and Subsidiary Mathematics and then was admitted to Makerere University Veterinary School for a four year course in Veterinary medicine. In 1986, he went for a Master of Science degree at the University of Glasgow United Kingdom.

== Career ==
After university, Byabashaija taught Physics, Chemistry and Mathematics at Lakeside Secondary School in Luzira.

In 1982, Byabashaija joined Uganda Prisons Service and underwent a Cadet Assistant Superintendent of Prisons Course at the Prisons Training School then he joined the Uganda Prisons Service. He was first posted to Kigo Prison to run the prisons hatchery, for about 15 years and eventually became Officer-in-Charge of Kigo Prison. In 1999, he was promoted to Assistant Commissioner of Prisons and in 2000 was transferred to Prisons Headquarters as Assistant Commissioner in charge of farms inspectorate. He was later promoted to a Senior Assistant Commissioner for two years and then promoted to Deputy Commissioner General for One and half years after which he became the Commissioner General of Prisons replacing Joseph A.A. Etima who retired in 2005.

In 2020, the Parliament Appointments Committee rejected the re-appointment of Byabashaija as the Commissioner-General and James Mwanje, as his deputy of the Uganda Prisons Service on the basis of old age. But in January 2022, President Yoweri Museveni reappointed Byabashaija as the Commissioner-General of the Uganda Prisons Service after sometime of undisclosed discussions. In the same year, the Forum for Democratic Change (FDC) protested against the re-appointment of Johnson Byabashaija as the Commissioner General of Prisons.

Byabashaija is also a poultry breeder carried out mainly on his farm called Jena Farms in Kigo, Entebbe.

=== Reforms and modernization ===
In April 2026, Byabashaija chaired the 36th Uganda Prisons Service Council meeting at the Luzira Prisons Complex. During the session, he called for the accelerated implementation of the national parole system for the 2026/27 period to address prison congestion and transition the service toward a rehabilitative justice model. His tenure has also seen the approval of a modern staffing structure intended to expand the force to over 49,000 personnel.

== Sanctions ==
In December 2023, the United States Department of the Treasury's Office of Foreign Assets Control (OFAC) imposed sanctions on Johnson Byabashaija, the Commissioner General of the Uganda Prisons Service, citing allegations of gross human rights abuses. According to the U.S. government, the sanctions were linked to alleged acts of torture and other serious human rights violations committed by members of the Uganda Prisons Service against detainees since at least 2005. The statement indicated that prisoners were reportedly subjected to abuse by prison staff and other inmates acting under the direction of prison authorities. It also alleged that some detainees, including government critics and members of marginalized groups, were denied access to legal counsel and subjected to physical abuse while in custody. At the time the sanctions were announced, the Uganda Prisons Service had not issued an official response.

== Personal life ==
Since 1988, Byabashaija has been married to Byabashaija Janipher.

== Awards ==
In 2017, Byabashaija was awarded with the JLOS Distinguished Service Award at the Recognition awards 2017 during the 22nd Joint Government of Uganda and Development Partners JLOS Annual Review conference at Speke Resort Munyonyo.

== See also ==
- Kale Kayihura
- Law enforcement in Uganda
