= Kiryandongo Refugee Settlement =

- Location within Uganda
- Coordinates: 1.957°N 32.181°E
- Country: Uganda

Kiryandongo Refugee Settlement is a refugee camp in Bweyale in Kiryandongo district Uganda.

It is a home for refugees from Burundi, DR Congo, Rwanda, Kenya, Sudan and South Sudan.

== Population ==
Annual population snapshot in Kiryandongo Settlement
Date	Refugee Population	Source
January 2018	57,202	
April 2019	57,818	
January 2020	64,745	
January 2021	70,787	
January 2022	75,823	
January 2023	65,909	
January 2024	82,971	

For the time periods represented in the table, the majority of refugees housed in the settlement are from South Sudan. In 2024, refugees from Sudan became the second-largest group in the settlement, following intensification of the Sudanese civil war.

== History ==
The Kiryandongo area was first used for resettling refugees in 1954 when the British colonial administration asked the Bunyoro Native Government to give the Colonial Government of the Governor to move Kenyan refugees fleeing the Mau Mau Uprising to Kigumba in what was then Masindi District. The Bunyoro Native Government gave land to the Governor for the period of 49 years. During the Idi Amin administration, the land was part of a large-scale government ranching scheme, of which reminders remain today in the names of the subdivisions of the camp. This left the land sparsely populated.

In 1990 the Ugandan government gazetted the virtually uninhabited land around Kiryandongo for refugee resettlement. Ethnic Acholi people fleeing the Sudan People's Liberation Army from Parjok in South Sudan were settled in Kiryandongo after temporarily being held in Kitgum and Masindi. During the 1990s the Sudanese refugees were joined by Ugandan Acholi IDPs from the LRA-affected areas of Gulu and Kitgum.

Kiryandongo also served as an interim stop for displaced people transiting to other camps, including 22,000 who moved from the Achol-Pii Refugee Settlement to Kyangwali in 2002.

== Social services ==
The Youth Peacemaker Network provides youth programs to more than 65,000 refugees at Kiryandongo. It is a collaboration with the Western Union Foundation.

== Health care and sanitation ==
As part of the United Nations High Commissioner for Refugees, Kiryandongo provides basic necessities to over 100,000 refugees.

Some of the health centers in the settlement were taken by RMF which included, Panyadi Health Centre III, Panyadi Hills Health Centre II, and Reception Centre Clinic.
