= Michael Kabango =

Ugandan general

Brigadier Michael Kabango
- Born: Uganda
- Citizenship: Uganda
- Education: Mutolere Senior Secondary School, (High School Diploma); Kampala International University, (Bachelor's Degree)
- Years active: 1986–present
- Known for: Military matters
- Title: Commander of Ugandan Contingent to AMISOM

Brigadier Michael Kabango is an Ugandan military officer, who serves as the commander of the Ugandan contingent to the African Union Mission to Somalia (AMISOM). He took up that position on 21 December 2018.

== Background and education ==
He was born in Uganda and attended local primary schools. He obtained his High School Diploma from Mutolere Senior Secondary School, in Mutolere, Kisoro District, in the Western Region, of Uganda. Later, he graduated with a Bachelor's degree from Kampala International University.

== Career ==
Immediately prior to his deployment to Somalia, Kabango was the Commanding Officer of the 5th UPDF Division, based in Achol-Pii, Agago District, in the Northern Region of Uganda. Before that, he served as Uganda's military attaché to Somalia.

Kabango previously served as the Deputy Force Commander of the African Capacity for Immediate Response to Crisis (ACIRC), based in Luanda, Ãngola. He has also served as the Military Commander of the African Union Rapid Transition Force established to kick Joseph Kony out of South Sudan and Central African Republic.

Kabango has previously served in Somalia, when he was part of the UPDF Battle Group II, in 2008. In 2018, he took over as UPDF AMISOM Commander from Major General (at that time Brigadier) Paul Lokech, who was then appointed Commandant of Uganda Rapid Deployment Capability Centre (URDCC).

== See also ==
- Military of Uganda
- Peter Elwelu
- Hudson Mukasa
- Dick Olum
