= Common Goal (charity) =

Football industry charitable movement

- Founded: 4 August 2017; 9 years ago
- Founders: Jürgen Griesbeck; Juan Mata (co-founder)
- Type: Fundraising
- Legal status: Active
- Purpose: "We’re uniting the world of professional footballers behind a shared commitment to give back to society."
- Website: www.common-goal.org

Common Goal is a pledge-based charitable movement by streetfootballworld for the football industry, which was launched with the public support of Spanish footballer Juan Mata.

The movement encourages professional football players and coaches to pledge at least one percent of their salaries to a collective fund that supports football charities around the world. According to founder Jürgen Griesbeck, the movement was created to build a sustainable and lasting connection between the football industry and social change.

The movement was launched on 4 August 2017, with Mata announcing his intention to make the pledge via an article in The Players' Tribune. He then urged his fellow footballers to join him, claiming that Common Goal is the most effective and sustainable way that football can deliver long-term social impact on a global scale.

== History ==
On 29 November 2017, UEFA president Aleksander Čeferin became the first football leader to join Common Goal. Čeferin stated he believed that football has the power to change the world and he was inspired by Juan Mata to join this movement. He also called on his fellow football players, coaches, clubs and leagues to show if they care about social responsibility.

On 18 January 2018, Asian Football Confederation executive committee member Moya Dodd joined Common Goal to take on a role as the management committee of the movement, working to allocate money to various football programs across the globe.

On 21 May 2018, FC Nordsjælland became the first football club to join Common Goal. The club's CEO, Søren Kristensen, said that the club would like to make a difference to others through football, whether it be regarding gender equality or developing young people and football players. Additionally, the entire ten-member management, club chairman and backroom staff pledged one percent of their salary, and all player and administrative staff contracts include the same pledge with the option to opt-out.

On 30 August 2018, Banco Santander became the first sponsor of the UEFA Champions League to support Common Goal and to work together over the following three years to use football to support financial inclusion.

On 5 October 2018, it was announced that, as part of a partnership with EA Sports, FIFA 19 would feature Common Goal as part of "The Journey", a game mode in which players take control of fictional character Alex Hunter, affording players the chance for Hunter to join the movement during the character's rise through the professional game. EA Sports also donated $200,000 in support of the movement and its capacity to drive progress towards achieving the UN Global Goals with the aid of football.

On 17 January 2019, the Manchester United Supporters' Trust (MUST) became the first supporters' trust in the world to make the pledge to Common Goal, announcing that MUST members will donate 1% of their membership fees to the charity and helping to promote Common Goal to the wider global Manchester United supporter base, and through other fan organisations.

In May 2019, Australian women's players Aivi Luik and Alex Chidiac became the 99th and 100th players to join Common Goal, equaling the ratio of men and women.

On 23 September 2019, Jürgen Klopp became the first Premier League coach to join Common Goal. He made the announcement during his speech as he collected the Men's Coach of the Year prize at the Best FIFA Football Awards in Milan, Italy.

== Notable players and managers ==
Name (Note: Includes a football administrator, director of football/sporting director, club director, football agent, journalist, esports professional and YouTuber.)	Nationality	Joined On	Source
Juan Mata	Spain	4 August 2017	
Mats Hummels	Germany	17 August 2017	
Megan Rapinoe	United States	14 September 2017	
Alex Morgan	United States	14 September 2017	
Giorgio Chiellini	Italy	29 September 2017	
Serge Gnabry	Germany	5 October 2017	
Dennis Aogo	Germany	9 October 2017	
Alex Brosque	Australia	13 October 2017	
Julian Nagelsmann	Germany	13 October 2017	
Jacek Nibliecky	Poland		
Hasan Ali Kaldırım	Turkey	19 October 2017	
Charlie Daniels	England	20 October 2017	
Alfie Mawson	England	20 October 2017	
Olga García	Spain	23 October 2017	
Verónica Boquete	Spain	23 October 2017	
Pauline Bremer	Germany	23 October 2017	
Heather O'Reilly	United States	23 October 2017	
Jean Sseninde	Uganda	23 October 2017	
Nicole Regnier	Colombia	23 October 2017	
Shinji Kagawa	Japan	26 October 2017	
Duncan Watmore	England	9 November 2017	
Chris Wondolowski	United States	12 November 2017	
Alexander Esswein	Germany	15 November 2017	
Daniel Didavi	Germany	22 November 2017	
Bruno Saltor	Spain	23 November 2017	
Ana Cate	Nicaragua	24 November 2017	
Bokang Mothoana	Lesotho	25 November 2017	
Giuliano Modica	Argentina	26 November 2017	
Borja Lasso	Spain	27 November 2017	
Alberto Prada	Spain	27 November 2017	
Rúnar Alex Rúnarsson	Iceland	28 November 2017	
David Accam	Ghana	28 November 2017	
Aleksander Čeferin	Slovenia	29 November 2017	
Tessel Middag	Netherlands	5 December 2017	
Kasper Schmeichel	Denmark	7 December 2017	
Irene Paredes	Spain	26 December 2017	
Moya Dodd	Australia	18 January 2018	
Sofie Junge Pedersen	Denmark	15 March 2018	
Kasper Hjulmand	Denmark	15 March 2018	
William Troost-Ekong	Nigeria	26 March 2018	
Ainhoa Tirapu	Spain	12 April 2018	
David Lombán	Spain	12 April 2018	
Cristian Portilla	Spain	12 April 2018	
Siobhan Chamberlain	England	1 July 2018	
Isaac Christie-Davies	Wales	1 July 2018	
Mads Valentin Pedersen	Denmark	13 July 2018	
Frederik Schram	Iceland	1 August 2018	
José Pedrosa Galán	Spain	26 August 2018	
Jens Bauer	Germany	5 September 2018	
Haley Carter	United States	5 September 2018	
Hernán Pérez	Spain	5 September 2018	
Jane Ross	Scotland	26 September 2018	
Michael Bittner	Germany	28 September 2018	
Eric Cantona	France	12 October 2018	
Liv Cooke	England	16 October 2018	
Luis Manuel Seijas	Venezuela	7 November 2018	
Tim Parker	United States	13 November 2018	
Tabea Kemme	Germany	15 November 2018	
Casey Stoney	England	22 November 2018	
Mayara Bordin	Brazil	29 November 2018	
Dominika Čonč	Slovenia	30 November 2018	
Leila Ouahabi	Spain	1 December 2018	
Claudia Zornoza	Spain	2 December 2018	
Tatiana Pinto	Portugal	3 December 2018	
Nataša Andonova	North Macedonia	4 December 2018	
Méline Gérard	France	5 December 2018	
Brenda Pérez	Spain	7 December 2018	
Martina Piemonte	Italy	9 December 2018	
Esther González	Spain	10 December 2018	
Nayeli Rangel	Mexico	12 December 2018	
Leon Balogun	Nigeria	18 December 2018	
Johnathan McKinstry	Northern Ireland	20 December 2018	
Olav Øby	Norway	24 January 2019	
Denis Jercic	Croatia	29 January 2019	
Vinksy	France	1 February 2019	
Godsway Donyoh	Ghana	20 February 2019	
Marco Micaletto	Italy	22 February 2019	
Erin McLeod	Canada	27 February 2019	
Ildefons Lima	Andorra	7 March 2019	
Flemming Pedersen	Denmark	26 March 2019	
Gideon Mensah	Ghana	28 March 2019	
Maxwell Woledzi	Ghana	28 March 2019	
Ella Masar	United States	8 April 2019	
Gorka Etxeberria	Spain	6 May 2019	
Jakub Fulnek	Czech Republic	10 May 2019	
Christie Murray	Scotland	15 May 2019	
Sophie Howard	Scotland	15 May 2019	
Victor Nelsson	Denmark	18 May 2019	
Adriana Leon	Canada	21 May 2019	
Christine Sinclair	Canada	21 May 2019	
Desiree Scott	Canada	21 May 2019	
Janine Beckie	Canada	21 May 2019	
Jenna Hellstrom	Canada	21 May 2019	
Jordyn Huitema	Canada	21 May 2019	
Kadeisha Buchanan	Canada	21 May 2019	
Lindsay Agnew	Canada	21 May 2019	
Quinn	Canada	21 May 2019	
Robyn Gayle	Canada	21 May 2019	
Sabrina D'Angelo	Canada	21 May 2019	
Shannon Woeller	Canada	21 May 2019	
Shelina Zadorsky	Canada	21 May 2019	
Stephanie Labbé	Canada	21 May 2019	
Aivi Luik	Australia	30 May 2019	
Alex Chidiac	Australia	30 May 2019	
Onome Ebi	Nigeria	6 June 2019	
Mary Mwakapila	Zambia	27 June 2019	
Barbra Banda	Zambia	27 June 2019	
Alfonso de la Cruz	Spain	3 July 2019	
Johanna Omolo	Kenya	19 July 2019	
Diego Bardanca	Spain	26 July 2019	
Robbie Crawford	Scotland	26 July 2019	
Pernille Harder	Denmark	7 August 2019	
Magdalena Eriksson	Sweden	7 August 2019	
Julia Simic	Germany	2 September 2019	
Isabella Echeverri	Colombia	5 September 2019	
Natalia Gaitán	Colombia	5 September 2019	
María Pry	Spain	9 September 2019	
Sonia Bermúdez	Spain	9 September 2019	
Paloma Fernández Rodríguez	Spain	9 September 2019	
Damaris Egurrola	Spain	9 September 2019	
Jürgen Klopp	Germany	23 September 2019	
Lenie Onzia	Belgium	27 September 2019	
Johnny McKinstry	Northern Ireland	2 October 2019	
Maximiliane Rall	Germany	18 October 2019	
Arianna Criscione	United States	29 October 2019	
Umut Nayir	Turkey	31 October 2019	
Bendik Rise	Norway	1 November 2019	
Simon Jakobsen	Denmark	1 November 2019	
Eniola Aluko	England	5 November 2019	
Kathrine Larsen	Denmark	7 November 2019	
Juan Carlos Amorós	Spain	14 November 2019	
Hannah Godfrey	Scotland	14 November 2019	
Siri Worm	Netherlands	14 November 2019	
Bianca Rech	Germany	15 November 2019	
Sabrina Buljubašić	Bosnia and Herzegovina	19 November 2019	
Bianca Sierra	Mexico	22 November 2019	
Stephany Mayor	Mexico	22 November 2019	
Chris Butcher	England	12 December 2019	
Aida Gaistenova	Kazakhstan	18 December 2019	
Umut Nayir	Turkey	19 December 2019	
Alice McKeegan	England	20 December 2019	
Jérémy Guillemenot	Switzerland	15 January 2020	
Xaver Schlager	Austria	24 April 2020	
Ryan Porteous	Scotland	21 October 2020	
Cyriel Dessers	Nigeria	20 November 2020	
Lisa Evans	Scotland	4 November 2021	
Vivianne Miedema	Netherlands	4 November 2021	
Maya Le Tissier	England	May 2022	

=== Businesses ===
Name	Nationality	Joined On	Source
World Football Summit	Spain	15 September 2017	
The Fussball Project	United States	27 October 2017	
Donosti Cup	Spain	29 November 2017	
11 Players	Canada	10 December 2017	
Kampoos	Spain	18 December 2017	
FC Nordsjælland	Denmark	21 May 2018	
MUSC Hongkong	Hong Kong	11 July 2018	
EFF Rosalía	Spain	31 October 2018	
WARUBI Sports	United States	27 December 2018	
Manchester United Supporters' Trust	United Kingdom	17 January 2019	
Pinatar Arena	Spain	20 March 2019	
A.D. Calasanz Pozuelo	Spain	5 November 2019	
Oakland Roots SC	United States	30 June 2020	
Aficiones Unidas	Spain	—N/a	
Butcher Kennedy	Spain	—N/a	
Colonial Soccer Club	United States	—N/a	
Goal Click	United Kingdom	—N/a	
The Goal Hanger	United Kingdom	—N/a	
Mixed Bag United	Ireland	—N/a	
New Entertainment Order	Australia	—N/a	
Prosper Era	United Kingdom	—N/a	
Red Box Productions	United Kingdom	—N/a	
SAM Sports	Germany	—N/a	
Spielerrat	Germany	—N/a	
University Soccer	United States	—N/a	
