= Jean Sseninde =

Ugandan footballer (born 1992)

Personal information
- Date of birth: 4 December 1992 (age 33)
- Place of birth: Kampala, Uganda
- Position: Defender

Senior career*
Years	Team	Apps	(Gls)
- Queens Park Rangers
- Charlton Athletic
- * Club domestic league appearances and goals

Jean Namayega Sseninde (born 4 December 1992), also Jean Sseninde, is a Ugandan former footballer who played as a defender for the Queens Park Rangers in the FA Women's National League South and for the Uganda national team.

== Background and education ==
Sseninde was born in the Central Region of Uganda on 4 December 1992. Her mother is Rosemary Sseninde, the former State Minister for Primary Education in the Ugandan Cabinet, who also served as the Wakiso District Women's Representative in the Parliament of Uganda.

Namayega attended local elementary schools for her primary education. She went to Gayaza High School for her O-Level studies. She transferred to Saint Mary's School Kitende, where she completed her A-Level education.

== Career ==
Following her graduation from Kitende, Sseninde sought counsel from Majidah Nantanda, the head coach of the Uganda women's national soccer team. Nantanda recommended that Sseninde join a professional football club in England, through the Federation of Uganda Football Associations (FUFA). Prior to joining the London Phoenix Ladies FC, Sseninde played for the Charlton Athletic, for one season. Before that, she played for the Queens Park Rangers, for three seasons.

== Other consideration ==
Sseninde is a member of Common Goal, an organisation whose members pledge to give away at least one percent of their annual salary to charity. She founded the Jean Sseninde Foundation, which sponsors the annual Jean Sseninde Women Football Development Tournament, aimed at discovering and mentoring female soccer talent in Uganda.

In 2020, the South Sudan Football Association hired Sseninde as a consultant to help promote football for girls in South Sudan; at the time she was also on the women's committee of the Confederation of African Football.

In 2021 she created Jean Sseninde United, which promotes football for girls and women in Kasangati.
