= 2025 Kawempe North by-election =

Parliamentary by-election in Uganda

The 2025 Kawempe North by-election was held on 13 March 2025, following the death of MP Muhammad Ssegirinya. His family members supported different candidates.

== Conduct ==
Nomination of candidates were open between 26 and 27 February 2025. Campaigning ended on 11 March.

== Candidates ==
There were 10 candidates in the by-election.

== Results ==
Elias Luyimbazi Nalukoola, the National Unity Platform (NUP) candidate, was declared the winner.

Kawempe Division North – Parliamentary By-Election 2025
Candidate	Political party	Votes	Percentage
Luyimbazi Elias Nalukoola	NUP	17,764	64.36%
Nambi Faridah Kigongo	NRM	8,593	31.14%
Murerwa Hanifah Karadi	Independent	381	1.38%
Luwemba Lusswa Muhammad	Independent	240	0.87%
Mukiibi Sadat	FDC	239	0.87%
Mutazindwa Muhamood	Independent	186	0.67%
Kasacca Henry Mubiru	DP	100	0.36%
Musiitwa Ismail	PPP	39	0.14%
Nsereko Moses	Independent	32	0.12%
Engena-Maitum Edward	Independent	22	0.08%
Total valid votes		27,596	100%
Rejected (invalid) ballots		406	—
Total ballots counted		28,002	—
Spoilt ballot papers		49	—

== Reaction ==
The National Resistance Movement announced a legal challenge to the vote.
