= Joyce Moriku =

Ugandan politician (born 1969)

Joyce Moriku Kaducu
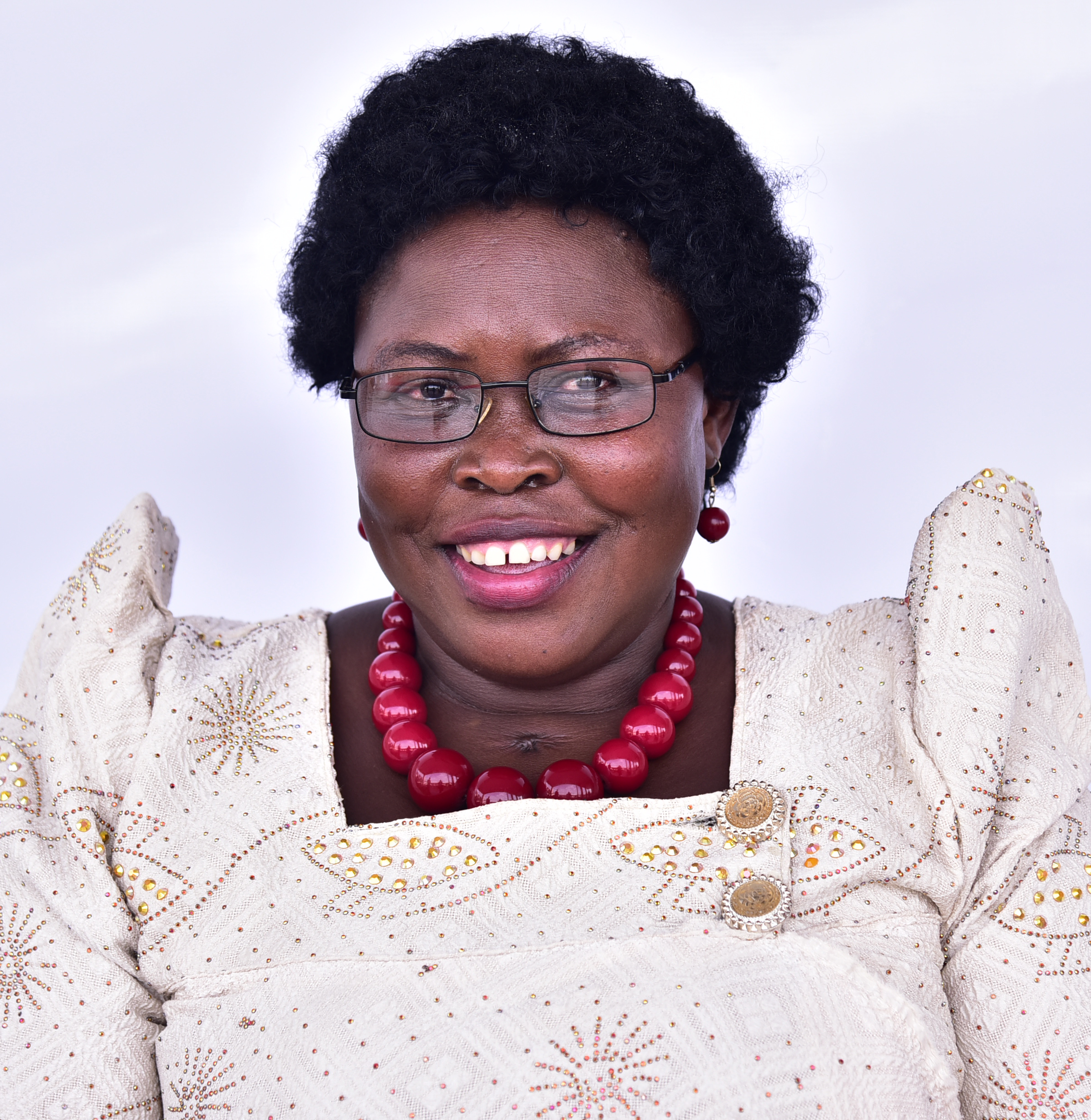
- Moriku Joyce
- Born: 21 April 1969 (age 57); Moyo District, Uganda
- Citizenship: Uganda
- Education: Mbarara University (Bachelor of Medicine and Bachelor of Surgery); Makerere University (Master of Medicine in Pediatrics); Gulu University (Dip. in Project Planning & Management) (PhD in Neuroscience)
- Occupations: Pediatrician, Academic and Politician
- Years active: 2002 — present
- Title: Minister of State for Primary Health Care
- Spouse: Dr Felix Kaducu

Joyce Moriku also known as Joyce Kaducu (born 21 April 1969), is a Ugandan pediatrician, academic and politician who served as the State minister for Primary Education in the 2021–26 cabinet, having succeeded Rosemary Seninde.

Previously she was the Minister of State for Primary Health Care in the Ugandan Cabinet. She was appointed to that position on 6 June 2016, replacing Sarah Achieng Opendi, who became State Minister for Health, General Duties. She also served as the elected Member of Parliament for Moyo District Women Representative in the 11th Parliament (2021 to 2026).

== Early life and education ==
Dr. Moriku was born in Moyo District, West Nile sub-region, in the Northern Region of Uganda, on 21 April 1969. She attended Laropi Primary School for her elementary education. She studied at Metu Senior Secondary School, in Moyo, for her O-Level education, before she transferred to Sacred Heart Senior Secondary School in Gulu for her A-Level studies.

In 1997, she was admitted to Mbarara University School of Medicine to study Human Medicine, graduating with a Bachelor of Medicine and Bachelor of Surgery in 2002. In 2005 she received a Postgraduate Diploma in Project Planning and Management from Gulu University. She then entered Makerere University School of Medicine at Mulago, where she obtained the Master of Medicine in Pediatrics in 2008. Still later, in 2015, Gulu University awarded her a PhD in Neuroscience.

== Career ==
=== Medical career ===
Following her first degree, Joyce Moriku interned at Lacor Hospital in Gulu from 2002 until 2003. Between 2003 and 2005, she worked as the medical coordinator for ⁣⁣ AIDS Support Organisation (TASO), based in Gulu. From 2005 until 2008, she worked as a senior house officer at Mulago National Referral Hospital. Following that, she worked as the medical director for one year at Mildmay Clinic on Entebbe Road, from 2008 until 2009. From 2010 until 2015, she worked as a lecturer in pediatrics at Gulu University and concurrently served as a consultant pediatrician at Gulu Regional Referral Hospital.

=== Political career ===
In 2016, Joyce Moriku entered elective politics by contesting for the Moyo District Women's Constituency. She won and is the incumbent in the 10th Parliament (2016 to 2021). On 6 June 2016, she was appointed State Minister for Primary Health Care.

== Personal life ==
She is married to Professor Kaducu an academic at Gulu University.

== See also ==
- Cabinet of Uganda
- Parliament of Uganda
