= Thomas Kwoyelo =

Ugandan war criminal

- Born: 1974 (age 51–52)
- Military career
- Allegiance: Lord's Resistance Army
- Service years: 1987 – 2009
- Rank: Commander and Colonel
- Known for: Allegations of war crimes, rape and murder
- Conflicts: Lord's Resistance Army insurgency

Thomas Kwoyelo is a former Commander and Colonel of the Lord's Resistance Army from Uganda. Starting from 1996, there were 12 counts and 52 criminal charges laid on Kwoyelo. He was accused of rape and murder.

In 2009 Kwoyelo was captured while in a shootout against the Ugandan Armed Forces, he was shot twice and injured. After recovering he was held in captivity for three months before being charged with war crimes, at which point he was transferred to a standard security prison in Uganda. In 2011 he appeared in court and pleaded not guilty to more than 90 charges of war crimes, including murder and hostage-taking. Due to the scale of the case against him, Kwoyelo's trial did not begin for over a decade, and he spent fourteen years in pre-trial detention. On 19 January 2024, Kwoyelo's trial finally began. He was the first LRA commander to be put on trial by Uganda (Dominic Ongwen had previously been tried by the International Criminal Court).

On August 13, 2024, a Ugandan court found Thomas Kwoyelo guilty of forty-four counts of war crimes and crimes against humanity. On October 25, the court found him guilty of 44 counts, including murder, rape, kidnapping and robbery. He was sentenced to 40 years in prison.

On December 16, 2024, a special court ordered the Ugandan state to pay up to US$2,500 per person to the victims of Thomas Kwoyelo.

== See also ==
- Lord's Resistance Army
- Ugandan Civil War
