= Stella Isodo Apolot =

Ugandan politician (1974–2026)

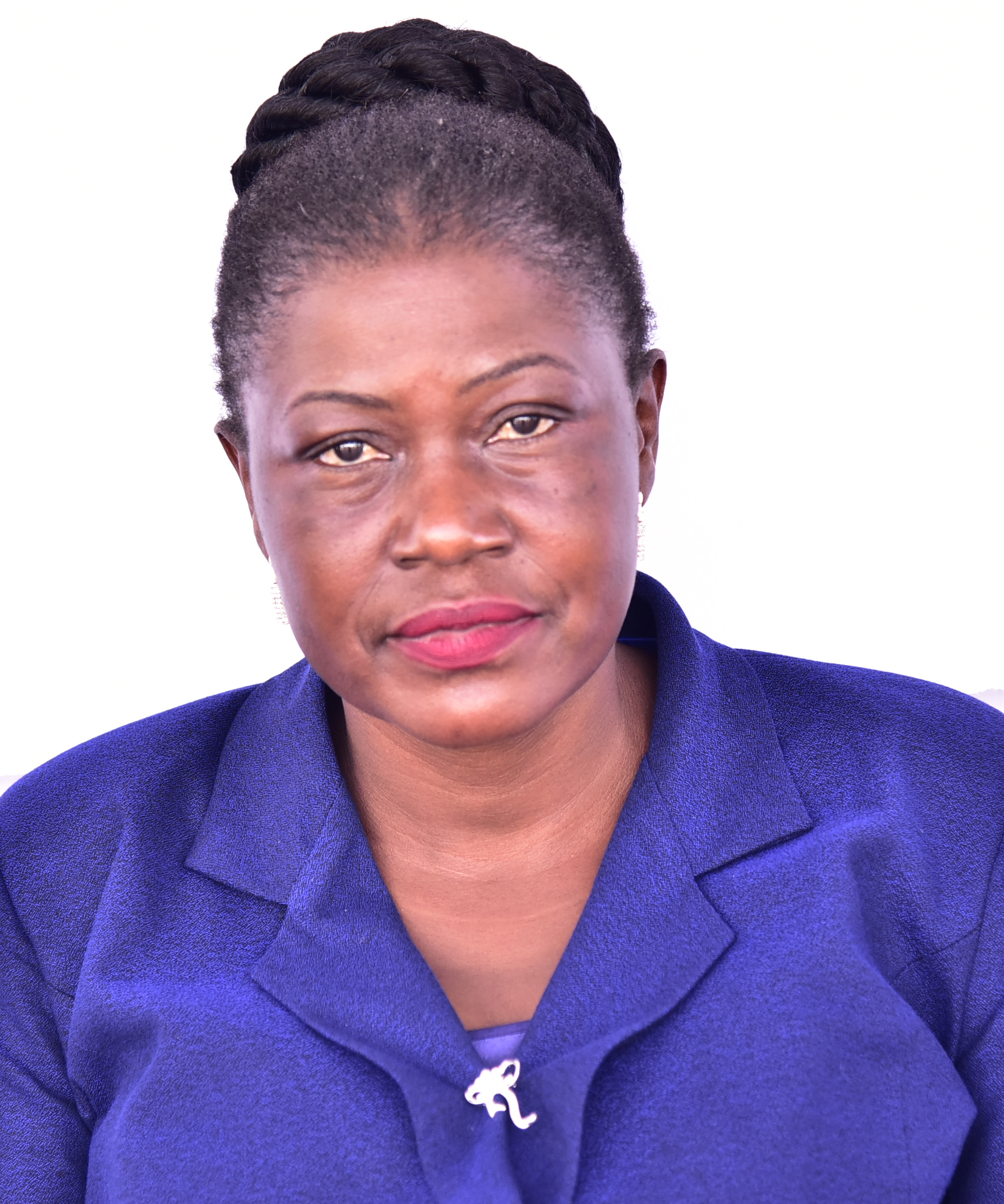
- Born: 25 October 1974; Ngora District, Uganda
- Died: 17 January 2026 (aged 51); Kampala, Uganda
- Occupation: Legislator
- Political party: Forum for Democratic Change (FDC)
- Spouse: Samuel Isodo
- Children: 3

Stella Isodo Apolot (25 October 1974 – 17 January 2026) was a Ugandan politician who, as of March 2021, was the Women's Representative-elect for Ngora District. She was a member of the Forum for Democratic Change (FDC).

== Political career ==
Apolot was affiliated with the Forum for Democratic Change (FDC) party under whose ticket she contested in Uganda's 2016 and 2021 general election. She was declared the party flagbearer in August 2020 after defeating her rival in the party primaries.

She initially contested the seat in 2016, but lost to Jacqueline Amongin.

== Personal life and death ==
Apolot was married to Samuel Isodo, a lawyer; they had three children. She died on 17 January 2026, at the age of 51.
