= Achol-Pii Refugee Settlement =

Achol-Pii Refugee Settlement Acholi-Pii
- Location within Uganda
- Coordinates: 2.65865°N 33.12469°E
- Country: Uganda
- District: Agago

The Achol-Pii Refugee Settlement was a major refugee and Internally displaced person camp in present-day Agago District in Uganda. It was one of the earliest and largest camps in Uganda.

Congolese refugees fleeing the Congo Crisis were settled in Achol-Pii in the 1960s.

Achol-Pii was consistently plagued by insecurity, suffering numerous insurgent attacks, the earliest in 1996. In August 2000the Lord's Resistance Army murdered six Sudanese and abducted three others in two separate raids on the camp. The LRA attacked again in August 2002, killing over 60 refugees and kidnapping four employees of the International Rescue Committee. This attack, cited as the LRA's worst on any IDP camp, led to the closure of Achol-Pii and the transfer of its population to more secure locations west of the Nile River, including Kirgyandongo and Kyangwali. In 2002, Achol-Pii underwent relocation efforts, with a phased movement of Sudanese refugees to other settlements, such as Kiryandongo and Kyangwali, as part of a broader initiative by the UNHCR, and in 2003, more than 16,000 Sudanese refugees were relocated.

== See also ==
- List of Refugee settlements in Uganda
