= Musaazi Charles Kalooli =

Ugandan social media influencer (1993/1994–2026)

- Born: 1993 or 1994
- Died: 6 June 2026 (aged 32)
- Occupation: Social media influencer

Musaazi Charles Kalooli (1993 or 1994 – 6 June 2026) was a Ugandan social media influencer. He was known by his account name Sebina, he rose to prominence in the 2020s due to his humorous videos posted on TikTok. He collaborated with numerous other creators and helped raise the digital profile for Uganda.

Kalooli died on 6 June 2026 after sustaining a head injury during a fall in his home. He was 32.
