= Sipi Falls =

Waterfalls in Uganda

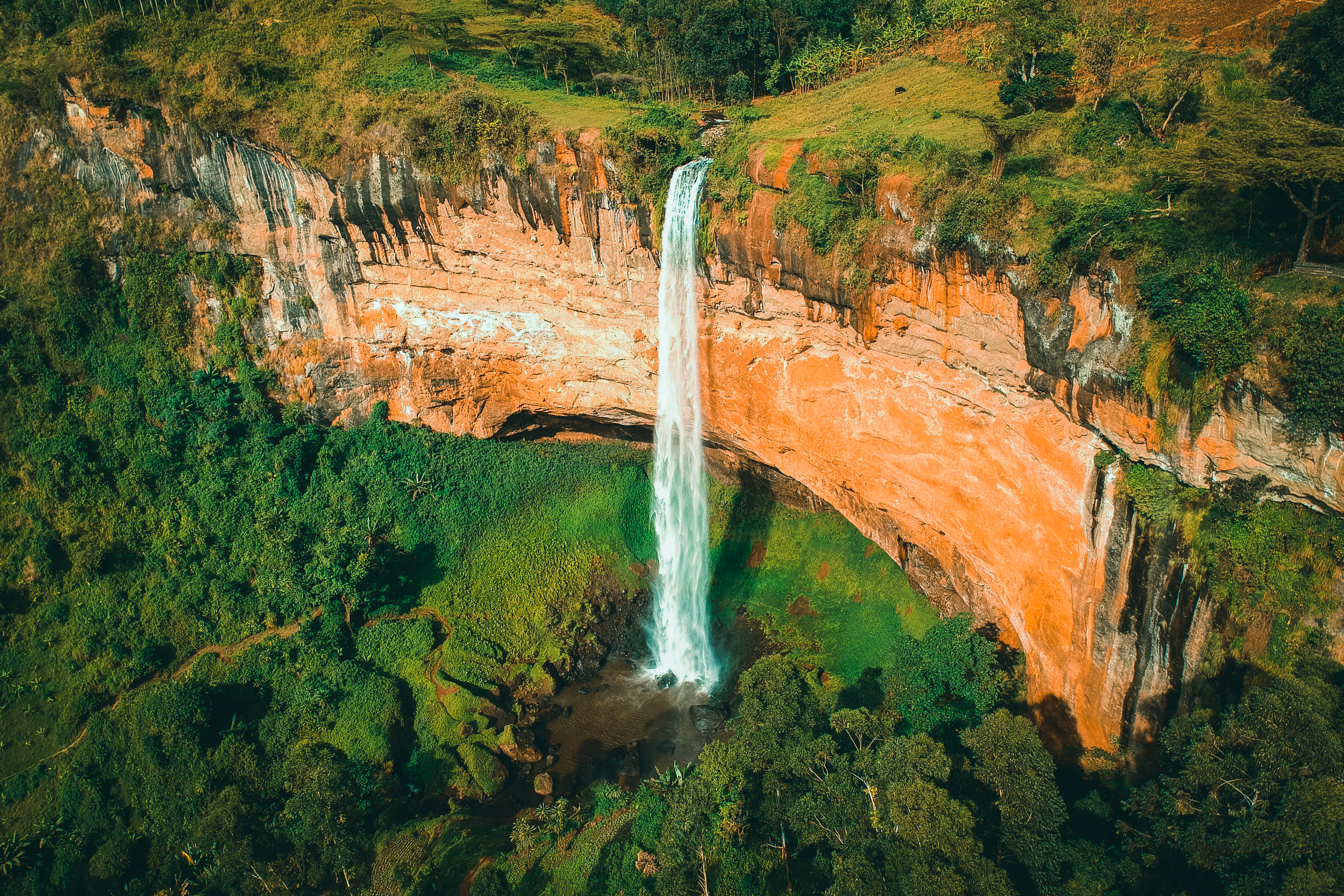
- Main falls at Sipi
- Interactive map of Sipi Falls
- Location: Sipi, Uganda
- Coordinates: 1.33439°N 34.38998°E
- Longest drop: 100 m (330 ft)

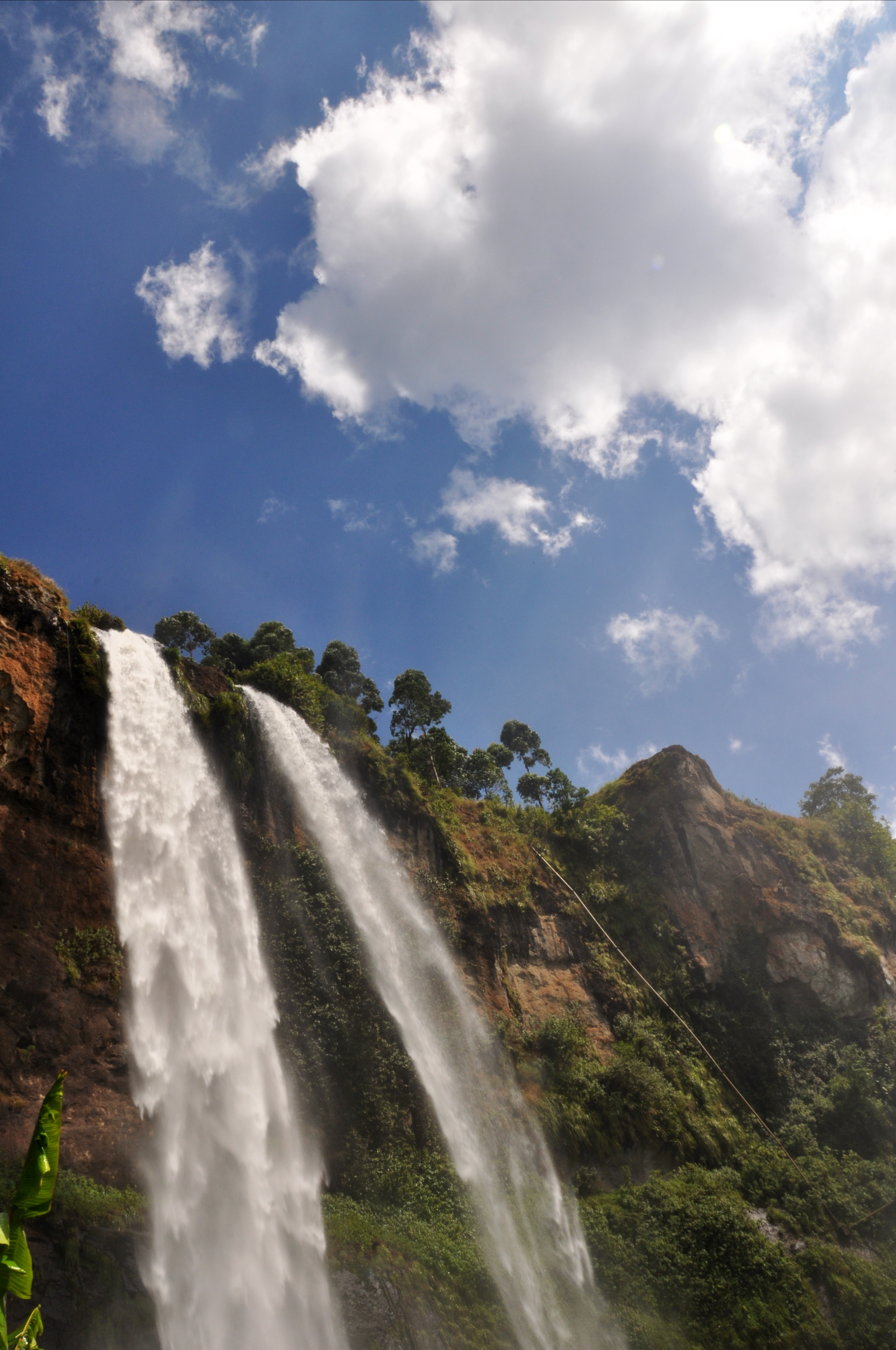
The close-up front view of Sipi Falls.

Sipi Falls is a series of three waterfalls located on the north-western slopes of the eponymous extinct volcano, Mount Elgon, in Uganda, with views over the Karamoja plains. The falls are situated to the northeast of Sironko and Mbale, adjacent to Mount Elgon National Park, which is located 1.7 kilometers (1 mile) away from the Kenyan border. The falls account for 10% to 20% of all tourist visits to Uganda every year.

At its highest point, the largest of the three waterfalls, known as Sipi Falls, stands at 95 meters (312 feet) high. The middle waterfall – known as Simba Falls, lies further upstream to the east. This waterfall has a drop of 74 m (243 ft). Further uphill is the third waterfall, known as Ngasire Falls, with a drop of approximately 85 m (262 ft).

== Location ==
The falls are located two miles northeast of the town of Sipi, 273.6 km (170 mi) northeast of the Ugandan capital of Kampala. The falls were formed by the Sipi River flowing from the upper slopes of Mount Elgon, and terminate in the Lake Kyoga basin.

== Name origin ==
The term "Sipi" is thought to have its origins in the local word sep, which denotes an indigenous plant resembling a wild banana after the Sipi River. This plant is commonly found along the Sipi riverbank and is characterized by its translucent, green fronds featuring a crimson rib, giving it an appearance reminiscent of a wild banana. The plant is also used as a medicine for treating fevers and measles by the local people in the area.

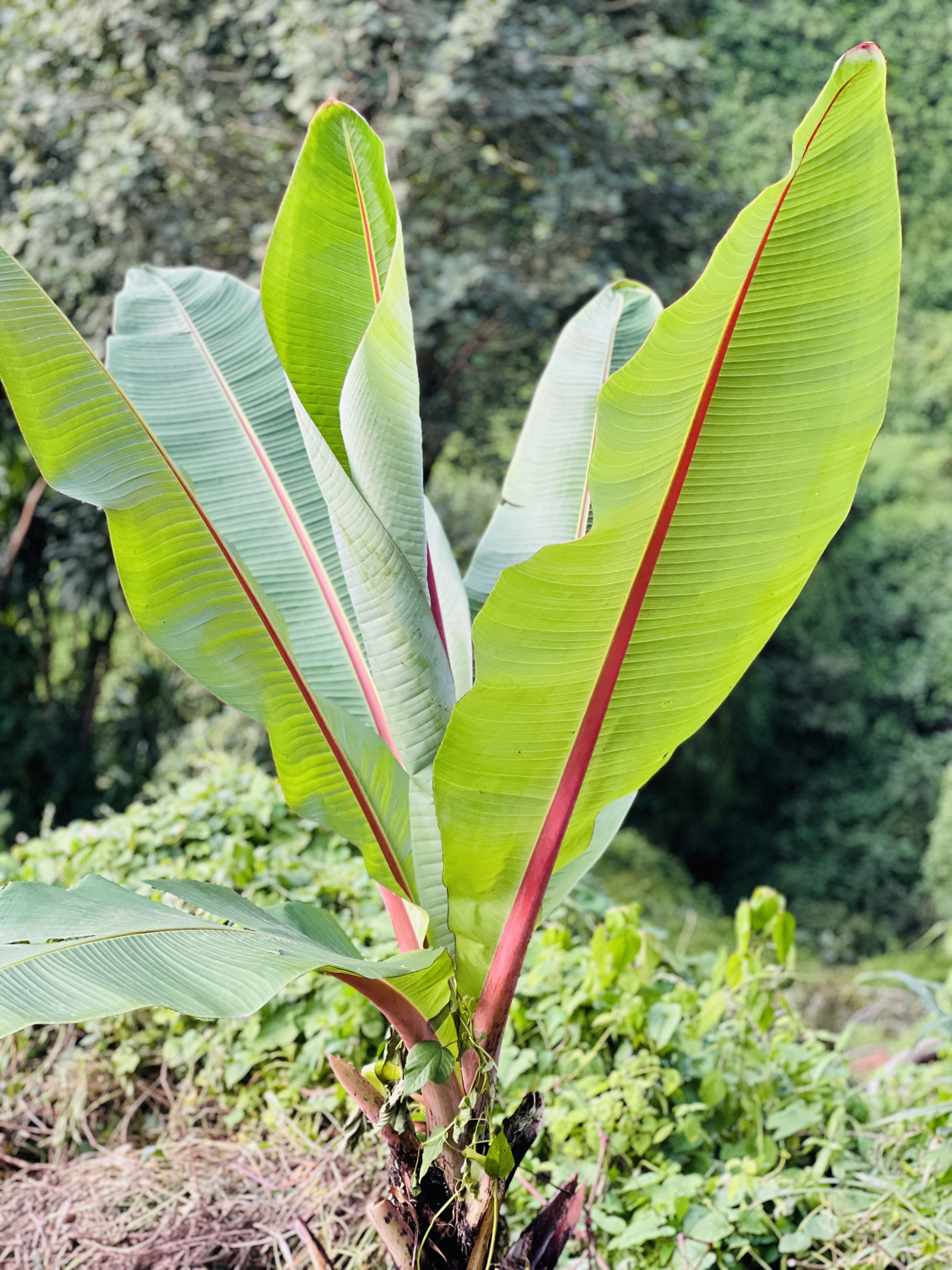
The sep plant, an indigenous species resembling a wild banana, thrives along the Sipi riverbank.

== Economy ==
The Sipi Falls area grows Bugisu Arabica coffee, which is profitable for the local people.

== Culture ==
The area around the falls is home to members of the Bagiso and Sabini ethnic groups.

== Tourism ==
The falls are a popular tourist destination in Uganda. Accommodation is available near the main falls. There are also several other waterfalls in the vicinity of Mount Elgon, such as Sisi Falls, as well as various caves, some of which are accessible by hiking trails. Sipi Falls is a good starting point for climbing Mount Elgon. It is possible to rappel down from the main falls, and tours are available to visit the surrounding coffee plantations.

== See also ==
- List of waterfalls
