= Derrick Ssenyonyi =

Ugandan photographer

- Born: Derrick Ssenyonyi; Nakasongola
- Citizenship: Ugandan
- Education: Uganda Hotel and Tourism Institute (Diploma in Tourism Management)
- Occupations: Photographer, storyteller, content creator
- Years active: 2016– present
- Known for: Photographing, storyteller, content creator

Derrick Ssenyonyi is a Ugandan photographer, storyteller and digital content creator.

== Early life and education background ==
He grew up in Nakasongola. He attended Nakasongola RC Primary School and later studied at Nakasongola St Josephs Secondary School. He graduated with a Diploma in Tourism Management from Uganda Hotel and Tourism Training Institute.

== Career ==
Ssenyonyi began his career in 2015–2016 as a street photographer, offering on-the-spot photography services in small towns. In 2017, he undertook an internship at the Uganda Tourism Board, where he later secured a position. During the COVID-19 pandemic in 2020, he transitioned into organizing travel experiences and expanding into filmmaking, content focusing on conservation, culture.

In September 2024, he hosted the Timeless Frames photography exhibition at Kampala Serena Hotel, featuring images of Uganda’s landscapes, wildlife, and cultural heritage.

Ssenyonyi has collaborated with organizations including the Uganda Tourism Board, Kenya Tourism Board, Visit Rwanda, Uganda Wildlife Authority, and Uganda Communications Commission. His work has been featured in various media outlets, exhibitions, and publications.

== Personal life ==
Ssenyonyi enjoys hiking and nature photography. He is also involved in mentoring aspiring photographers and content creators.
