= Uganda Prisons Service =

Prison Service

Prisons Service overview
- Formed: 1889
- Jurisdiction: Government of Uganda
- Headquarters: Kampala, Uganda
- Minister responsible: Minister of Internal Affairs, Ministry of Internal Affairs
- Prisons Service executive: Johnson Byabashaija, Commissioner General of Prisons
- Website: www.ugandaprisons.go.ug/index.php

Uganda Prisons Service is responsible for the safe custody of prisoners in Uganda, as well as their welfare, reformation and rehabilitation, also they have the duty to protect, promote and fulfill the rights of those incarcerated. The service has a vision and mission statements which guides their core objectives.

== Function ==
The functions the prison service perform are:

- To ensure that every person retained legally in a prison is kept in humane, safe custody, provided in court when requires until lawfully discharged or removed from prison.
- To facilitate the social rehabilitation and reformation of prisoners through specific training and educational programmes.
- To facilitate the re-integration of prisoners into their communities.
- To ensure performance by prisoners of work reasonably necessary for the effective management of prisons.
- To perform other such functions as the Minister after consultation with the Prisons Authority, may from time to time assign to the service

== Recruitment ==
Annually the prison service recruit new officers.
