= Muhammad Ssegirinya =

Ugandan politician (1988–2025)

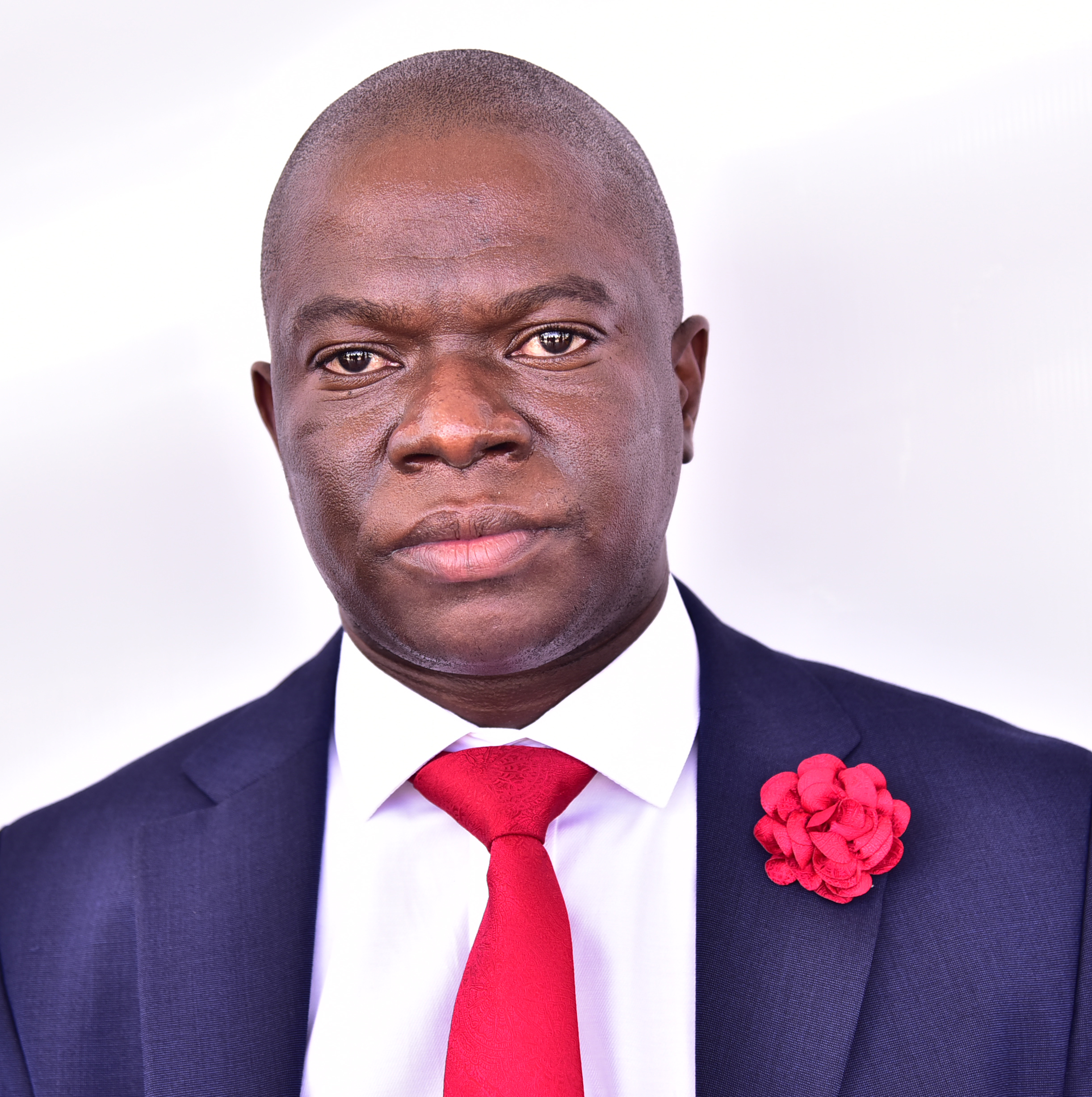
- Born: Muhammad Ssegirinya; 17 January 1987; Masaka, Uganda
- Died: 9 January 2025 (aged 37); Kampala, Uganda
- Citizenship: Uganda
- Education: Datamine Technical Business School (Diploma in Journalism); Musa Body University (MA Masters in the Science of Service Delivery)
- Occupation: Politician
- Years active: 2003–2025
- Known for: Politics
- Title: Member of the Parliament of Uganda
- Successor: Luyimbaza Elias Nalukoola
- Political party: National Unity Platform (NUP)

Muhammad Ssegirinya, commonly known as Mr. Updates, (17 January 1987 – 9 January 2025) was a Ugandan politician, humanitarian and journalist who served as a member of Uganda's 11th parliament, representing Kawempe North Constituency in Kampala city on the ticket of the National Unity Platform, Uganda's leading opposition party in parliament.

== Background ==
Ssegirinya was born in Butale, Kadugala, Masaka District, Uganda on 17 January 1987, to a family of Catholics as the first of five children. While at NTV's 'Tuwaye' show, Ssegirinya narrated his childhood as one that was full of poverty which even forced him to sell sugarcane from his peasant father who he described as a very poor peasant man. At birth he was named Richard Ssegirinya but later adopted the name Muhammad after switching religion from Roman Catholicism to Islam. While on a local TV show, 'Omuntu Wabantu,' Ssegirinya said that he studied his primary at Kadugala P/S and scored 13 Aggregates. He also attended Kaddugala Secondary school and Pimba secondary school in Kyebando for secondary school education. According to official documents that Ssegirinya used to contest the parliamentary seat for Kawempe North, he held a certificate in Urban food experience from Netherlands and basing on that Ugandan newspaper The Observer in a story that discussed the education levels of Uganda's Members of Parliament reported that he is one of the least educated members of the August house since that certificate is an equivalent to a Uganda Advanced Certificate of Education which is the bare minimum qualification for the role.

Ssegirinya died in Kampala on 9 January 2025, at the age of 37. The by-election for his seat was held on 13 March 2025. The National Unity Platform (NUP) candidate Elias Luyimbazi Nalukoola was declared the winner.

== Early career ==
Muhammad Ssegirinya started getting known among Ugandans when he started making regular calls on Kampala based radio talk shows referring to himself as ssegirinya eddoboozi lye kyebando. He later transformed into a social media sensation under the name Mr. Update. He served as the lord councillor for Kampala capital city representing the people of Kawempe North from 2016 to 2021. He later won election to become the area MP after defeating nine other contestants including then incumbent Abdulatif Ssebagala Ssengendo and former Deputy Lord Mayor Sulaiman Kidandala.

== Political career ==
In 2011 Ssegirinya contested the Kawempe North parliamentary seat but lost the vote. He contested the 2016 Forum for Democratic Change party primaries for the Kawempe North parliamentary seat, but he lost. He contested a position of councillor representing Kawempe North at city hall in Kampala, the seat of the Kampala Capital City Authority and won the election.

In 2021, Ssegirinya successfully contested the Kawempe North constituency on the National Unity Platform (NUP) party ticket. His victory was challenged in court by one of his contenders (Sulaiman Kidandala), but the case was dismissed and the court declared him winner.

== Arrest, torture and treatment ==
On 3 September 2021, Ssegirinya was summoned by Uganda Police Force to appear before the Criminal Investigation Department for questioning over his alleged involvement in rebel activities in Greater Masaka region.

On 17 September 2021, Masaka Chief Magistrate's court remanded him with four counts, three of murder and one of attempted murder. He was in Kitalya Maximum Security Prison.

Proof of the allegations was never presented. It is generally believed that Ssegirinya and Ssewanyana were arrested because they were popular opposition MPs. Also, in 2005, two popular MPs were arrested on fake charges and later acquitted. On 13 February 2023, the two were released on bail. On 10 August 2023, Ssegirinya arrived in the Netherlands to receive specialized treatment from AMC Amsterdam for his torture wounds. After his release from prison on bail, Ssegirinya was in and out of hospital in Nairobi and Kampala. He thus barely attended any parliamentary proceedings, but in August 2024 went on to declare that he would contest once more the post in 2026.
