= Faridah Nambi =

Ugandan politician, media personality and social activist

Faridah Nambi Kigongo
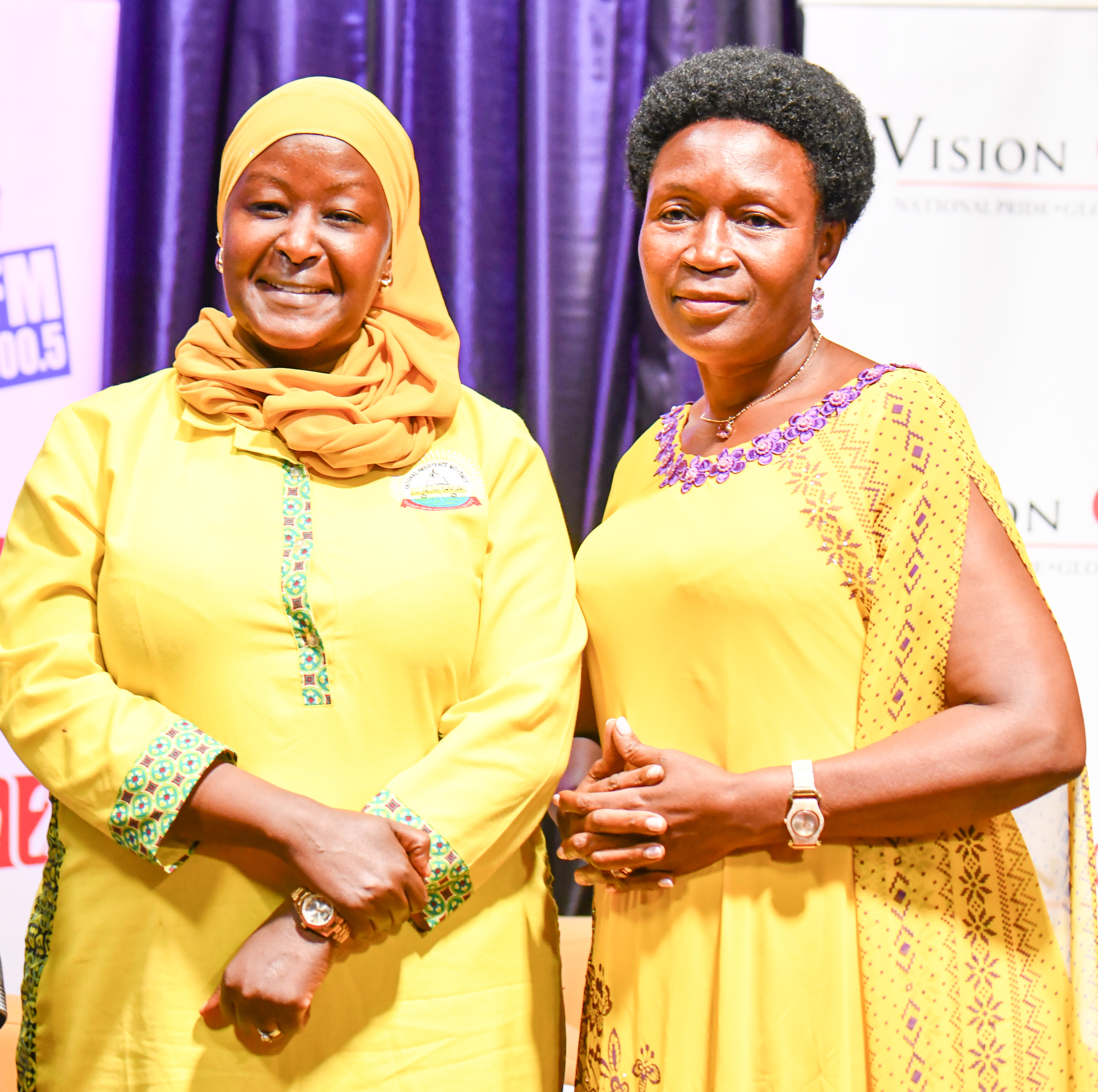
- Nambi (left) with politician Rosemary Seninde
- Other name: Faridah Nambi
- Education: Bachelor of Business Administration (Marketing); Master of Business Administration
- Alma mater: Makerere University Business School; Edinburgh Business School
- Occupations: Politician, social worker, talk show host
- Known for: Founder and executive director of Nambi Children Initiatives; host of Nambi Talkshow
- Political party: National Resistance Movement
- Father: Moses Kigongo

Faridah Nambi Kigongo (commonly known as Faridah Nambi) is a Ugandan politician, media personality and social activist. She is the founder and executive director of Nambi Children Initiatives (established in 2006) and the host of Nambi Talkshow, a programme previously broadcast on NTV Uganda.

She has contested elections on the ticket of the National Resistance Movement (NRM), including for Kampala District Woman Representative in the 2021 general election and for the Kawempe North parliamentary seat in the March 2025 by-election.

== Early life and education ==
A 2010 Daily Monitor profile described Nambi as a Muslim woman from Butambala District.

In March 2025, Daily Monitor reported that she attended Gayaza Junior School and Kawempe Muslim Secondary School, later earning a Bachelor of Business Administration (Marketing) from Makerere University Business School and a Master of Business Administration from Edinburgh Business School.

== Career ==
=== Social work ===
Nambi founded Nambi Children Initiatives in 2006 as a charitable organisation supporting orphans and other vulnerable children, including in Kampala's informal settlements.

A 2010 Daily Monitor profile reported that she left a job at the Civil Aviation Authority, where she had worked for seven years, to focus on community work through her organisation.

=== Television and public communication ===
Nambi created Nambi Talkshow in 2007, a programme described in the White House summit participant biography as featuring elders discussing values and life skills, and broadcast on NTV Uganda. New Vision has described the programme as a national talk show that has hosted debates on issues such as HIV/AIDS.

== International engagement ==
Nambi attended the U.S. Presidential Summit on Entrepreneurship in Washington, D.C., in April 2010, an event hosted by President Barack Obama.

A White House blog post about the summit discussed her work and noted that she was introduced as having earned the nickname "The Oprah of Uganda" for her talk show work.

== Political career ==
=== NRM primaries and the 2021 Kampala Woman MP election ===
Uganda Radio Network reported that Nambi won the NRM primary for the Kampala District Woman parliamentary seat in September 2020, polling 9,005 votes at the tally centre in Kawempe.

Official results published by the Electoral Commission for the 2021 parliamentary elections show that she finished second in the Kampala District Woman Representative race with 94,870 votes, behind National Unity Platform candidate Shamim Malende (314,865 votes).

=== 2025 Kawempe North by-election ===
In January 2025, the NRM selected Nambi as its flag bearer for the Kawempe North parliamentary by-election held after the death of incumbent MP Muhammad Ssegirinya.

According to New Vision, the by-election, held on 13 March 2025, was won by the National Unity Platform candidate Elias Nalukoola with 17,764 votes, while Nambi placed second with 8,593 votes.

Daily Monitor reported that she later withdrew an application seeking a vote recount after the Electoral Commission had gazetted the winner.

== See also ==
- National Resistance Movement
- Politics of Uganda
- 2021 Ugandan general election
