= Bweyale Town =

Bweyale
- Town Council
- Location within Uganda
- Coordinates: 1°56′26″N 32°8′22″E
- Country: Uganda
- Region: Western Uganda
- District: Kiryandongo District
- County: Kibanda North County
- Sub County: Kiryandongo

Bweyale is a town Council in Kiryandongo district along the Gulu - Kampala highway. It is home to over 50 different tribes both from Uganda and other neighboring countries.

Bweyale is about 220 km north of Kampala City on Kampala-Gulu highway in Kiryandongo District. It is a fast growing area with an open opportunity to become a business hub linking the central and western parts of Uganda to markets in the northern parts of the country.

A town known to house more than 50 ethnic groups, Bweyale is home to more than 98,000 people. While Local Council III Chairperson Edward Byakagaba describes his town as the most highly populated town council in the country where the refugee population outnumbers that of the indigenous residents, the fact that the town is fast expanding in areas of business and infrastructure makes it unique.
