= Corruption in Uganda =

Corruption in Uganda is widespread, characterized by low-level bureaucrats seeking bribes and grand-scale theft of public funds by political elites, as well as widespread patronage networks. The problem has been exacerbated by foreign aid. Patronage is used is to gain loyalty and support, allowing officials to retain power by building networks of subordinates. Public procurement is vulnerable due to the lack of transparency in transactions that happen within the government.

== Background ==
The process of giving gifts (formally bribes) in exchange for a service has been a longstanding feature of Ugandan tradition. In the past, this practice was the norm and not seen as illegal. This practice of patronage has long been central to politics in Uganda and cannot be legislated away overnight.

== Post-independence corruption ==
Corruption in Uganda is not a new thing. There is a long history of corruption within various Ugandan governments. Some of the governments' level of corruption were more extreme than others.

=== Idi Amin Regime ===
Uganda under Idi Amin was a very repressive state. His military was very aggressive and would kill people if they felt like they opposed the regime in some way, which led to about 100,000 people being killed during his seven years in power. During Amin's rule, he took over most businesses that were run by a different race and were given to his cronies. Many businesses began to shut down because of the lack of experience and knowledge the cronies had at running those businesses. All areas of society were being mismanaged and indisciplined. Soon, Uganda under the Amin regime became known for its culture of survival, which made corruption a central aspect of society. Many people left the formal economy and switched to informal institutions where there was no government regulation.

=== National Resistance Movement (NRM) ===
When the National Resistance Movement gained power in Uganda, its leader Yoweri Museveni was faced with the task of reforming the government. He also had to persuade people to rejoin the formal economy because the black market and other forms of informal institutions were widespread during the Amin regime. Museveni said that he felt like he adopted the evils of corruption. He had implemented laws and a ten-point program to help put an end to corruption in Uganda. Even though Museveni tried to reform the government, it had little impact on actually stopping corruption.

=== Office of the Prime Minister ===
A leaked confidential document has exposed hidden scandals within Uganda's Office of the Prime Minister (OPM). Charles Odongtho, the OPM's public relations expert, inadvertently revealed several crises in his contract renewal request. The revelations include:

- Distribution of rotten food in Nakasongola
- An incident involving 85 million shillings for the Deputy Prime Minister's medical care
- Excessive spending on helicopter rentals
- Land-grabbing allegations involving the Prime Minister's brother
- Controversial handling of an opposition supporter's disappearance

These revelations highlight a culture of secrecy and damage control within the OPM, raising questions about the office's ethics and transparency.

== Foreign aid ==
Foreign aid has contributed to corruption in Uganda through the large amounts of money and resources that are sent over. Foreign donors attempted to liberalize the Ugandan economy to try and put a stop to corruption. The World Bank and International Monetary Fund provide assistance to Uganda through Structural Adjustment Programs. These programs encouraged Uganda to decentralize and privatize. When Uganda began privatization, they were able to do so in a non-transparent way which allowed government officials to obtain these state-owned assets.

== Public sector ==
There are several high corruption risk areas, such as police, judiciary and procurement. Businesses are particularly vulnerable when bidding on public contracts in Uganda because processes are often non-transparent, and under-the-table cash payments are demanded from procurement officers.

On Transparency International's 2025 Corruption Perceptions Index, Uganda scored 25 on a scale from 0 ("highly corrupt") to 100 ("very clean"). When ranked by score, Uganda ranked 148th among the 182 countries in the Index, where the country ranked first is perceived to have the most honest public sector. For comparison with regional scores, the best score among sub-Saharan African countries (Note: Angola, Benin, Botswana, Burkina Faso, Burundi, Cameroon, Cape Verde, Central African Republic, Chad, Comoros, Côte d'Ivoire, Democratic Republic of the Congo, Djibouti, Equatorial Guinea, Eritrea, Eswatini, Ethiopia, Gabon, Gambia, Ghana, Guinea, Guinea-Bissau, Kenya, Lesotho, Liberia, Madagascar, Malawi, Mali, Mauritania, Mauritius, Mozambique, Namibia, Niger, Nigeria, Republic of the Congo, Rwanda, Sao Tome and Principe, Senegal, Seychelles, Sierra Leone, Somalia, South Africa, South Sudan, Sudan, Tanzania, Togo, Uganda, Zambia, and Zimbabwe.) was 68, the average was 32 and the worst was 9. For comparison with worldwide scores, the best score was 89 (ranked 1), the average was 42, and the worst was 9 (ranked 181, in a two-way tie).

== Anti-corruption efforts ==
Officials continue to engage in corrupt practices despite laws and institutional instruments that are in place to prevent and punish corruption. In an attempt to combat corruption, Yoweri Museveni created new institutions at both the local and national level. Donors were attracted to Uganda because of their willingness to reform and stop corruption. Foreign donors began sending conditional aid to help Uganda with its reform process. The aid that Uganda received came in the form of structural adjustment programs, that were formed by the IMF and World Bank. Structural adjustment programs were in the form of conditional loans with reform policies that were meant to help Uganda transition to a more liberalized state.

== See also ==
- Crime in Uganda
- International Anti-Corruption Academy
- Group of States Against Corruption
- International Anti-Corruption Day
- ISO 37001 Anti-bribery management systems
- United Nations Convention against Corruption
- OECD Anti-Bribery Convention
- Transparency International
