= Independence Day (Uganda) =

National holiday in Uganda

Ugandan Independence Day
- Observed by: Uganda
- Celebrations: Military parades, ceremonies
- Date: 9 October
- Next time: 9 October 2027
- Frequency: annual

Independence Day in Uganda is a state holiday celebrated on 9 October every year. It celebrates Uganda's independence from the United Kingdom in 1962.

== History ==
Explorer Henry Stanley discovered Uganda in 1875 which was divided into three main kingdoms at the time. In 1888, Uganda came under the control of the Imperial British East Africa Company. After World War II, native Ugandans were allowed to serve in government, and by 1955, half the members of the legislative council were Ugandans. In 1961, from 18 September to 9 October 1961, the Uganda Constitutional Conference was held at Lancaster House in London, to discuss the Report of the Uganda Relationship Commission tasked with "Considering the future form of government best suited to Uganda" and the question of the relationship between the Central government and other authorities in Uganda. The conference paved the way of Ugandan Independence. The following year, another conference, the Uganda Independence Conference, was organized from 12 June to 29 June at Marlborough House, designed to verify and implement what had been drafted at the Lancaster Conference. Few months later, on 9 October 1962, Uganda officially became an independent nation. The first independence day celebrations were held on the same day, with Andrew Cavendish, 11th Duke of Devonshire, the Minister of State for Commonwealth Relations, representing the UK at the ceremony. The date was established as a public holiday in subsequent years. On the first anniversary of independence in 1963, Uganda took a further step away from the United Kingdom when Elizabeth II was removed as head of state and replaced by the King of Buganda, Edward Muteesa, who assumed the new role of president.

== Celebrations ==
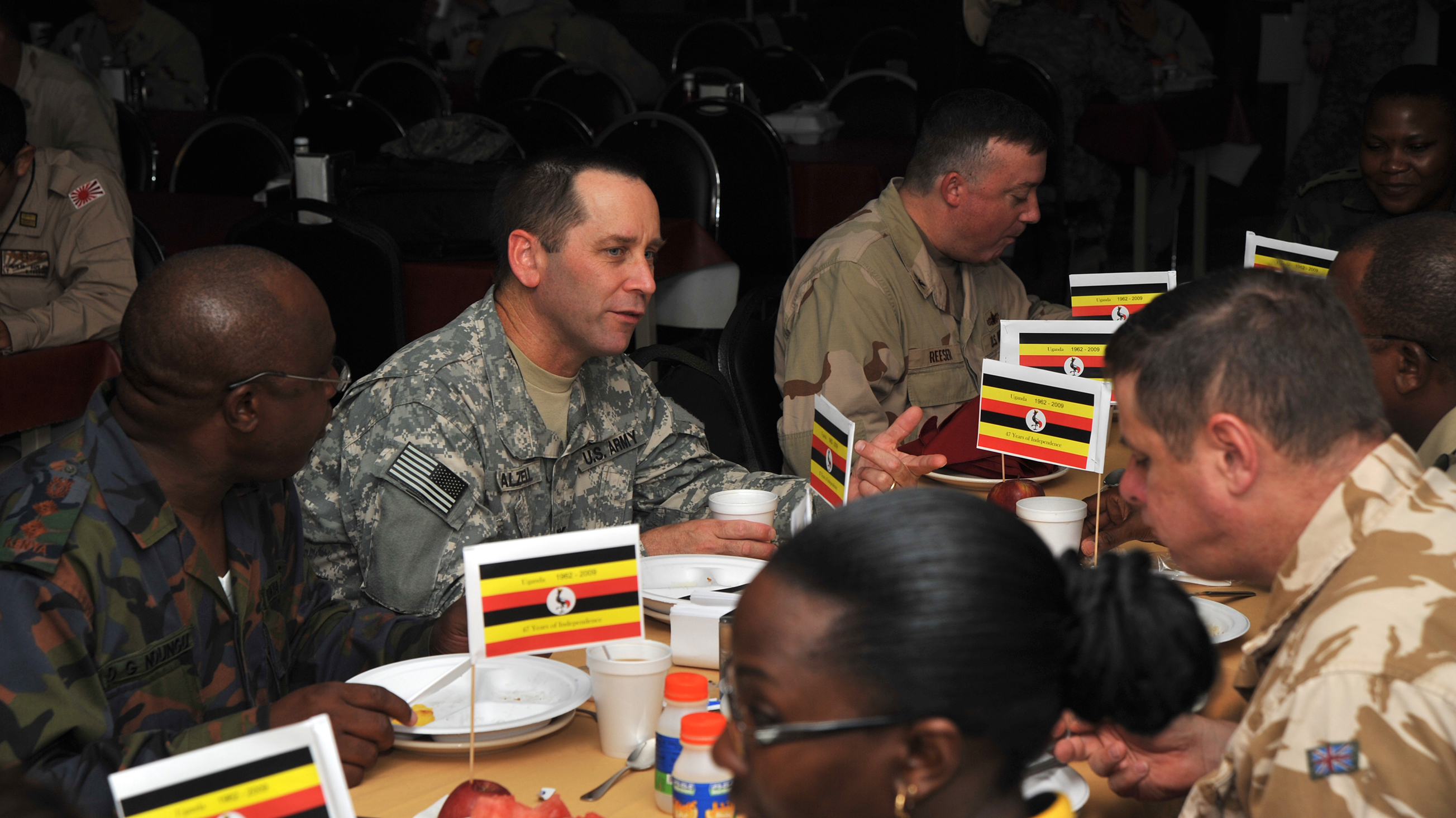
Camp Lemonnier, which is the only permanent U.S. military base in Africa, held an Independence Day breakfast in 2009.

Celebrations are held throughout Uganda and activities are designed to promote the nation. Performances are held by well-known artists. There are also cultural demonstrations that include traditional festivals. In 2017, Uganda celebrated their 55th anniversary of Independence.

=== Trooping of the Color and military parade ===
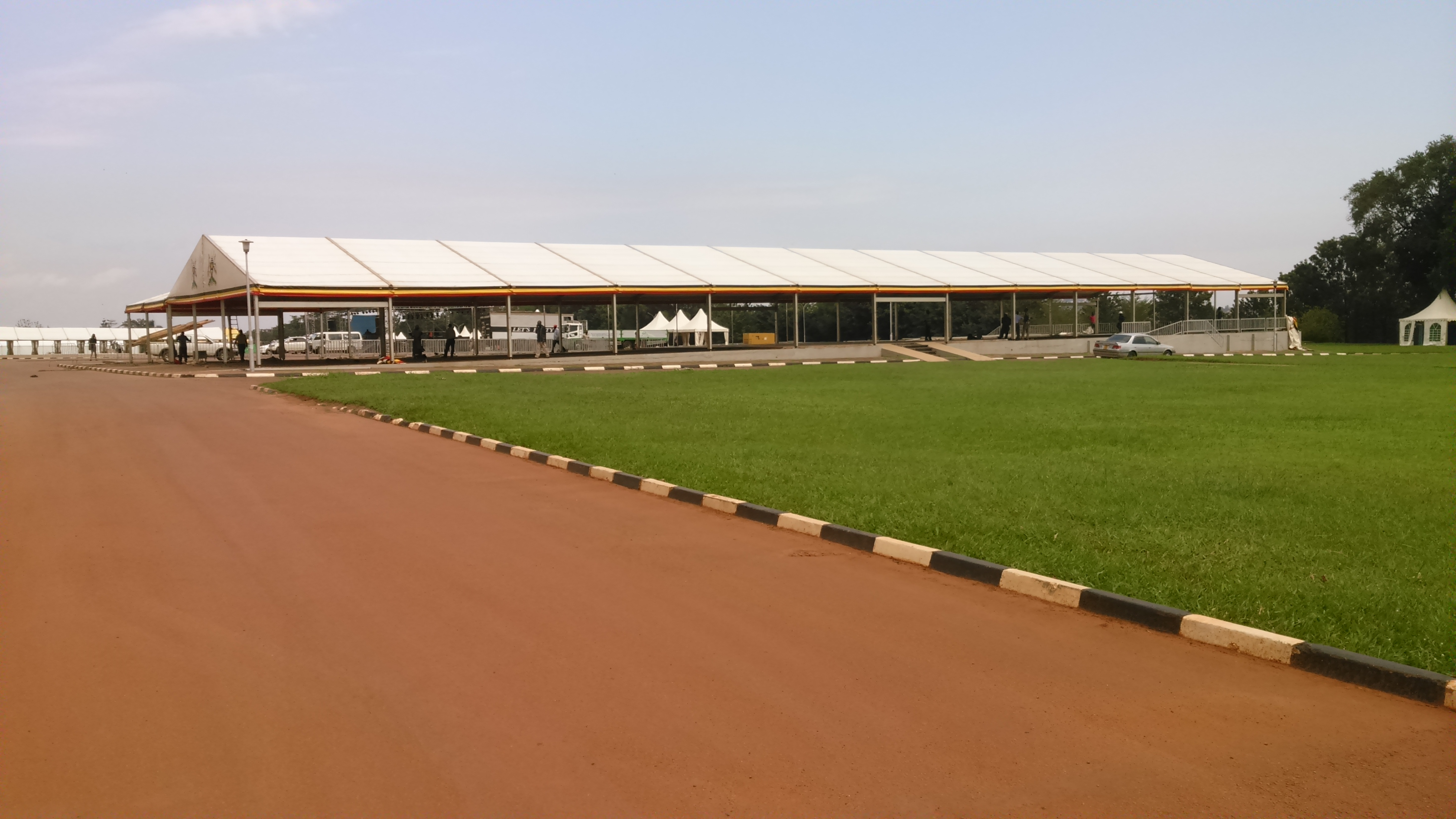
Kololo Ceremonial Grounds

A military parade is held annually to celebrate Independence Day, featuring a Trooping the Colour ceremony. This has frequently been held at the Kololo Ceremonial Grounds in Kampala, but in recent years has sometimes been held in alternative locations such as in 2024, when the ceremony was in Busia.

The ceremony is generally attended by the President of Uganda, who inspects a guard of honour and takes the national salute while "Oh Uganda, Land of Beauty" is played by the massed bands. The colours are then paraded and raised on the main flagpole. The president then delivers a holiday address, followed by religious leaders taking the central podium to pray for the nation. The parade commander then orders the parade to begin with a slow march, followed by a quick march.

== See also ==
- Public holidays in Uganda
- List of heads of state of Uganda
- Trooping the Colour

== Videos ==
- Uganda Celebrates 55 years of Independence
