= Archbishop Janani Luwum Day =

Public holiday in Uganda

Archbishop Janani Luwum Day is a public holiday in Uganda, celebrated 16 February annually. The holiday is dedicated to the life and service of Janani Luwum, the former archbishop of the Anglican Church of Uganda, who is typically regarded as having been murdered on the orders of the then-President Idi Amin.
