= 2020 in Uganda =

- Decades: 2000s; 2010s; 2020s
- See also: Other events of 2020; Timeline of Ugandan history

Events in the year 2020 in Uganda.

== Incumbents ==
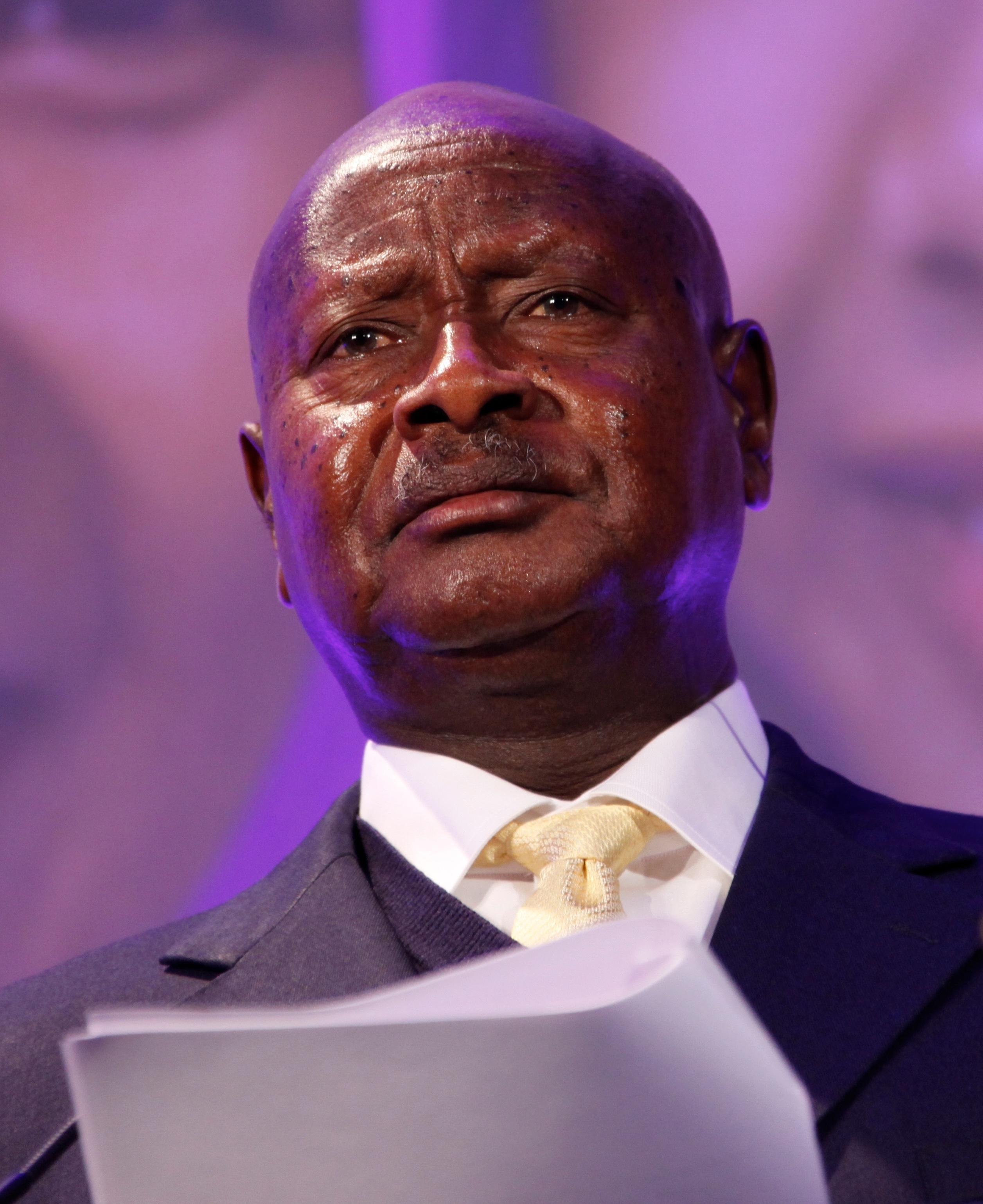
Yoweri Museveni

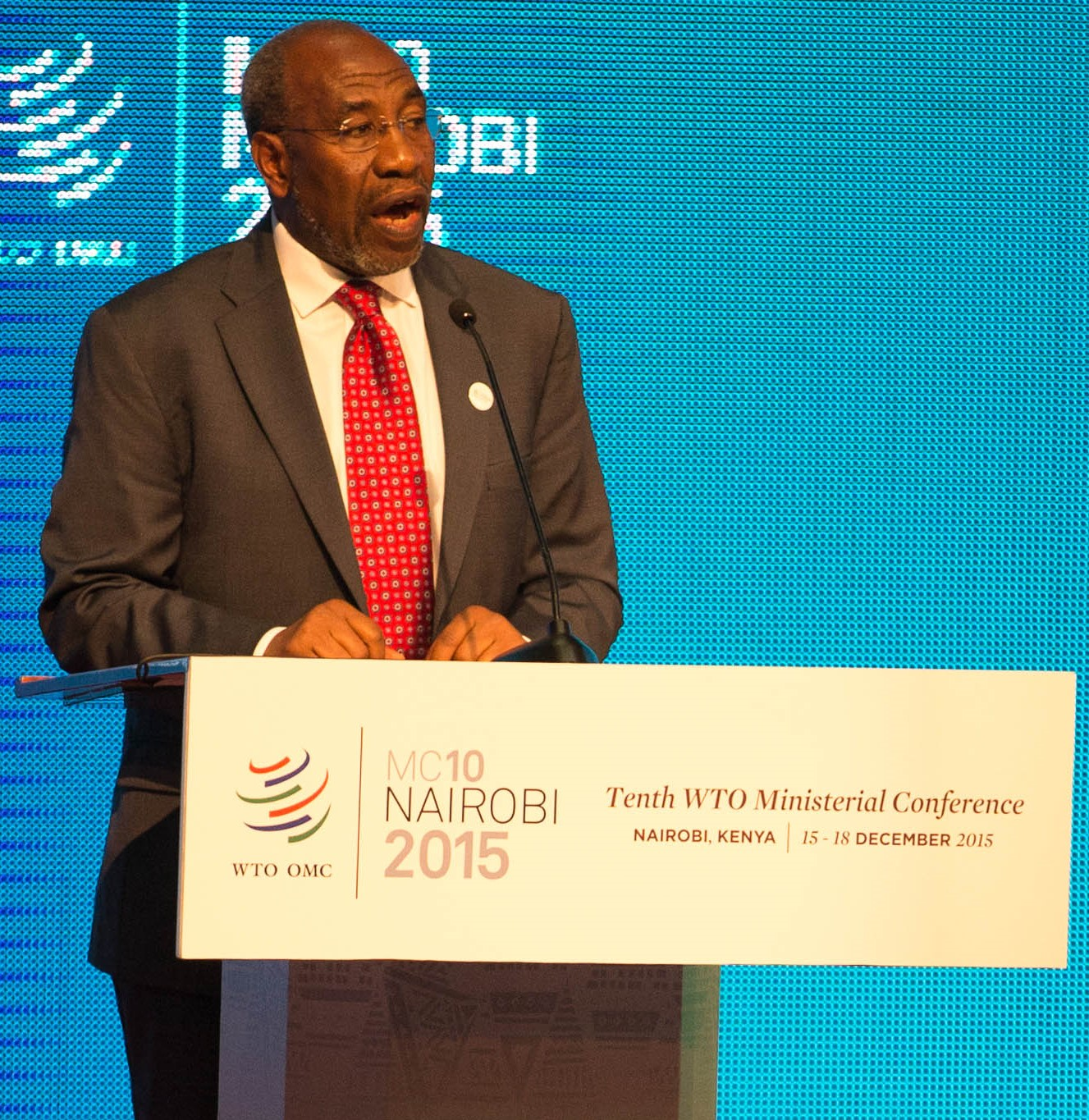
Ruhakana Rugunda

- President: Yoweri Museveni
- Vice President: Edward Ssekandi
- Prime Minister: Ruhakana Rugunda

== Events ==
=== January to April ===
- 1 February – The East African Community reviews its treaty.
- 5 February – Ugandan climate activist Vanessa Nakate, 23, complains about racism as she is cropped out of a photo published by the Associated Press in which she originally appeared with Greta Thunberg, Isabelle Axelsson, Luisa Neubauer and Loukina Tille at the World Economic Forum in Davos, Switzerland. "Africans have truly been erased from the map of climate action," Nakate tweeted. AP said they will expand their diversity training for employees.
- 9 February – Swarms of locusts are seen in Uganda and Tanzania.
- 12 February – PowerChina International Group Limited (PIGL) applies for a permit to build a US$1.2 dam and power plant between Lake Kyoga and Lake Albert in Uganda.
- 13 February – The African Development Bank gives Uganda US $1 million to fight Ebola.
- 15 March – In a historic first, all Peace Corps volunteers worldwide are withdrawn from their host countries.
- 18 March – Public gatherings including places of worship, pubs, weddings, music shows, rallies and cultural meetings were suspended for 32 days with immediate effect.
- 22 March – The first case of COVID-19 in the country was confirmed.
- 25 March – Public transport was suspended for 14 days, with only private cars with three occupants or less allowed on the road.

=== May to August ===
- 8 May – A hospital in Kilembe, Uganda and a small town Somalia are washed away in flooding; an unspecified number of people are killed. Hundreds of people have been killed by floodwaters in Kenya, Uganda, Somalia, Rwanda, and Ethiopia which have also displaced hundreds of thousands across the region.
- 2 June – President Yoweri Museveni predicts Uganda will lose US$1.6 billion in tourism revenues due to the COVID-19 pandemic.
- June 12 – Four poachers are arrested for killing an endangered gorilla in Bwindi Impenetrable National Park, Uganda.
- 22 July – Activist Bobi Wine starts a new political party, the National Unity Platform, ahead of the 2021 Ugandan presidential election.

=== September to December ===
- 17 September – Prison escape by 219 in Moroto Town, Northern Region.
- 14 October - Security forces detained Bobi Wine during a raid on his offices in Kamwokya, Kampala.
- 15 November – Dance with Valentino reality -talk show premieres on NTV Uganda.
- 20 November – The death toll from protests following the 18 November arrest of Robert Kyagulanyi Ssentamu ("Bobi Wine") grows to 37. Ssentamu is a pop singer and candidate for president in the 2021 Ugandan general election.
- December 25 – Ugandan civilian boat with over 50 passengers sank in Lake Albert after it was hit by strong wind. Ugandan officials said that 21 people have been rescued and 26 bodies recovered, DRC authorities said that at least 33 people died in an incident.
- December 26 – 2021 Ugandan general election: Campaigning is halted in Mbarara, Kabarole, Luwero, Kasese, Masaka, Wakiso, Jinja, Kalungu, Kazo, Kampala City, and Tororo, ostensibly for health reasons.
- December 30
  - Bobi Wine is arrested.
  - LGBTQ rights lawyer Nicholas Opiyo is freed on bail after being arrested on charges of money laundering.

== Deaths ==
- 28 January – Naomi Karungi, military officer (b. 1978).
- 12 February – Benon Biraaro, military officer (b. 1958).
- 15 February – Simon Kagugube, lawyer and corporate executive (b. 1956).
- 16 February – Nikita Pearl Waligwa, actress (b. 2005).
- 31 March – Gita Ramjee, Ugandan-South African HIV prevention researcher (b. 1956).
- 25 May – Jimmy Kirunda, football player and manager (b. 1950).
- 9 June – Kasirye Ggwanga, military officer and presidential advisor on Buganda Kingdom affairs (b. 1952).
- 15 September – Faith Alupo, politician and MP (b. 1983).
- 26 September – Nasser Sebaggala, 72, politician, mayor of Kampala (1998–1999, 2006–2011); intussusception.
- 27 October – Shaban Bantariza, colonel.
- 4 December – James Odongo, 89, Ugandan Roman Catholic prelate, Archbishop of Roman Catholic Archdiocese of Tororo (1999–2007).
- 19 December – Kirunda Kivejinja, 85, politician, Minister of East African Community Affairs (since 2016), COVID-19.
- 27 December – Francis Senteza, bodyguard for Bobi Wine; died of injuries after being overrun by a military truck.

== See also ==
- 2020 in East Africa
