= Adejoke =

Nigerian given name

- Gender: Female
- Language: Yoruba

Origin
- Origin: Nigeria
- Meaning: The crown takes care of this, together One who has come to be pampered
- Region of origin: South West, Nigeria

Adejoke is a feminine given name commonly used in Ibadan, Nigeria. It either means "the crown takes care of this, together" or "one who has come to be pampered".

Notable individuals with the name include:

- Adejoke Tugbiyele – Nigerian-American visual artist
- Adejoke Ayoola – Nigerian-American academic
- Adejoke Lasisi – Nigerian fashion designer and environmentalist.
