= Elizabeth Wathuti =

Kenyan environmental activist (born 1995)

Elizabeth Wanjiru Wathuti
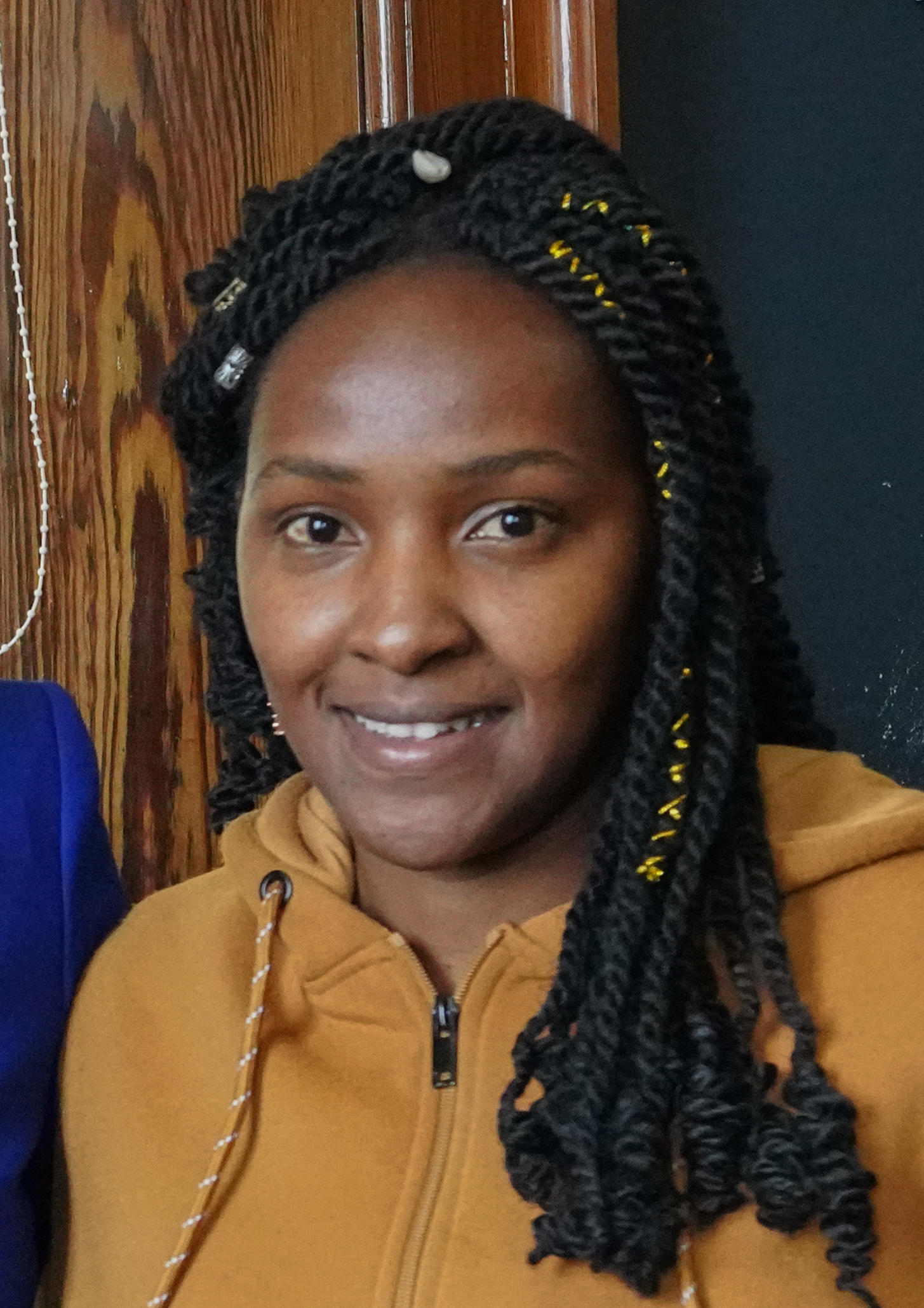
- Elizabeth Wathuti in 2022
- Born: 1 August 1995 (age 31); Kiandu village, Tetu Constituency, Nyeri County Kenya
- Education: Kenyatta University
- Years active: 2015–present
- Known for: Environment and climate activism since childhood

Elizabeth Wanjiru Wathuti (born August 1, 1995) is a Kenyan environmentalist and climate activist and the founder and CEO of the Green Generation Initiative, which nurtures young people to love nature and be environmentally conscious at a young age and has now planted 6.8 million tree seedlings in Kenya.

In 2025, she was named a TIME 1000 Most Influential Climate Leader in the World by TIME Magazine and had previously received the TIME 100 Impact Awards in Singapore. In 2019, she was awarded the Africa Green Person of the Year Award by the Eleven Eleven Twelve Foundation and was named as one of the 100 Most Influential Young Africans by the Africa Youth Awards.

Wathuti has spoken about the issue of loss and damage, which refers to wealthier nations paying into a fund to help those countries most vulnerable to climate change. "The people who are least responsible for the climate crisis are bearing the biggest brunt. Loss and damage is happening right now. Yet, rich countries with the greatest historical emissions are not acting to help frontline communities cope with the devastation they are facing. This is what climate injustice looks like," she said in Carbon Brief.

== Education ==
Wathuti graduated from Kenyatta University with a bachelor's degree in Environmental Studies and Community Development.

== Early childhood and environmental activism ==
Wathuti grew up in Nyeri County, which is renowned for having the highest forest cover in Kenya. She planted her first tree at the age of seven, and she established an environmental club in her high school with the help of her geography teacher. She was part of the leadership of Kenyatta University Environmental Club (KUNEC), where she was able to conduct numerous activities such as tree planting, cleanups and environmental education, all while increasing awareness of global environmental challenges like climate change.

In 2016, she founded Green Generation Initiative, to encourage young environmental enthusiasts, environmental and climate education, building climate resilience and greening schools. Her video, "The Forest is a Part of Me", was featured by the Global Landscapes Forum (GLF) as part of a series on Youth Voices in Landscapes. She has attended the UN's Conferences of the Parties on several occasions and has commented that the language used, especially the multitude of acronyms associated with climate change, can act as a barrier to young people's participation.

She is a recipient of a Wangari Maathai Scholarship award for her commitment to environmental conservation. Wathuti is also a member of the Green Belt Movement, which was founded by her role model Professor Wangari Maathai.

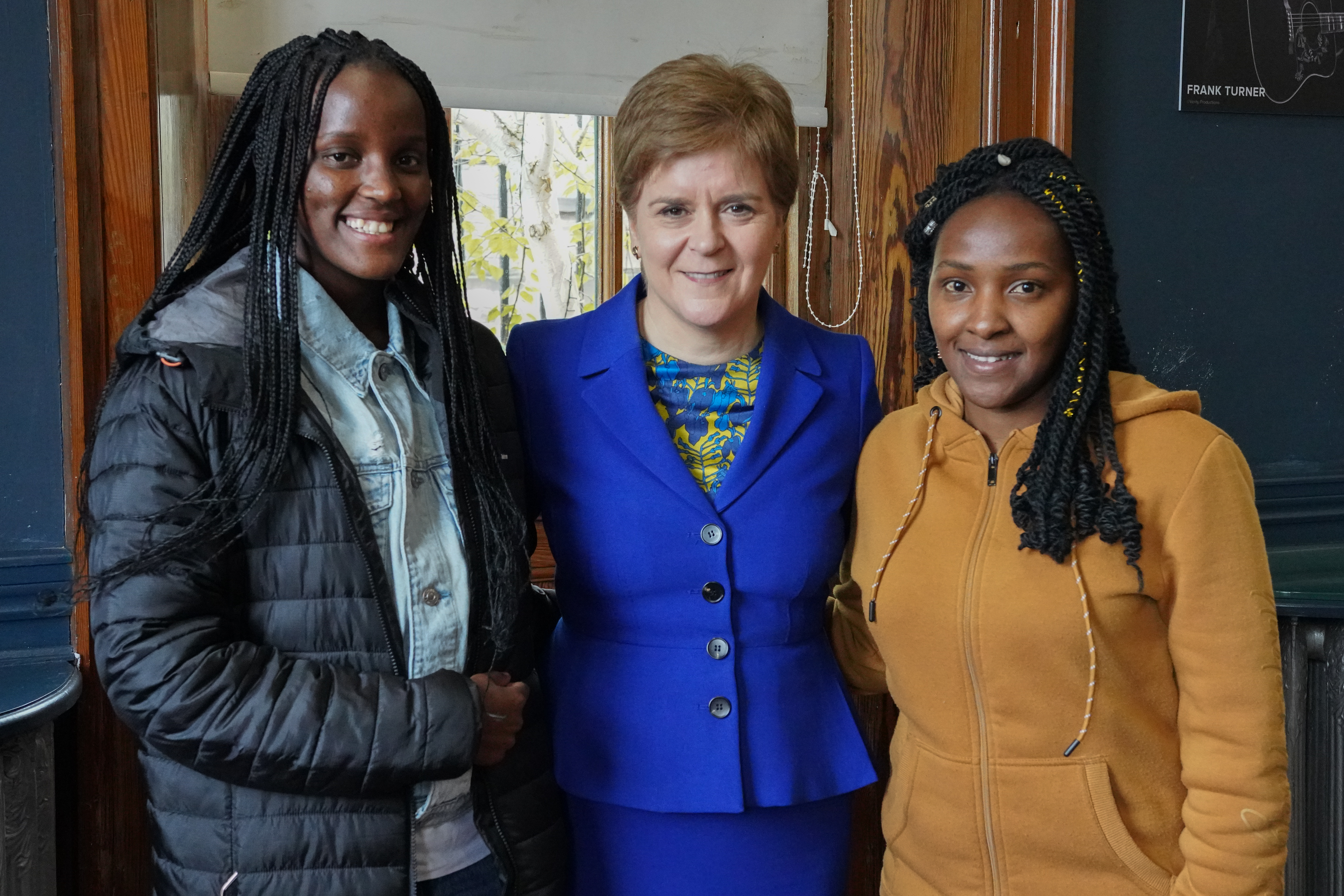
Conference on Loss and Damage due to Climate in Scotland in 2022. Vanessa Nakate, First Minister Nicola Sturgeon and Wathuti.

== Awards ==
In 2019, on International Youth Day, Wathuti was recognized by the Duke and Duchess of Sussex on their Instagram feed for her work in environmental conservation. She featured on the Queen's Commonwealth Trust website. In the same year she was named alongside Vanessa Nakate and Oladuso Adenike by Greenpeace as one of three young black climate activists in Africa trying to save the world.

== Awards and recognition ==
- 2016 fourth Wangari Maathai Scholarship Award
- Green Climate Fund Climate Youth Champion Award 2019
- Africa Green Person of the Year 2019 Award by the Eleven Eleven Twelve Foundation
- 100 Most Influential Young African by the Africa Youth Awards
- The Diana International Award (2019)
- UN Young Champions of the Earth Regional finalist for Africa (2019)
- International Youth Day 2019 recognition by the Duke and Duchess of Sussex
- Bloggers Association of Kenya - BAKE Awards (2018) for the best environmental blog
