= Vanessa Nakate =

Ugandan climate activist (born 1996)

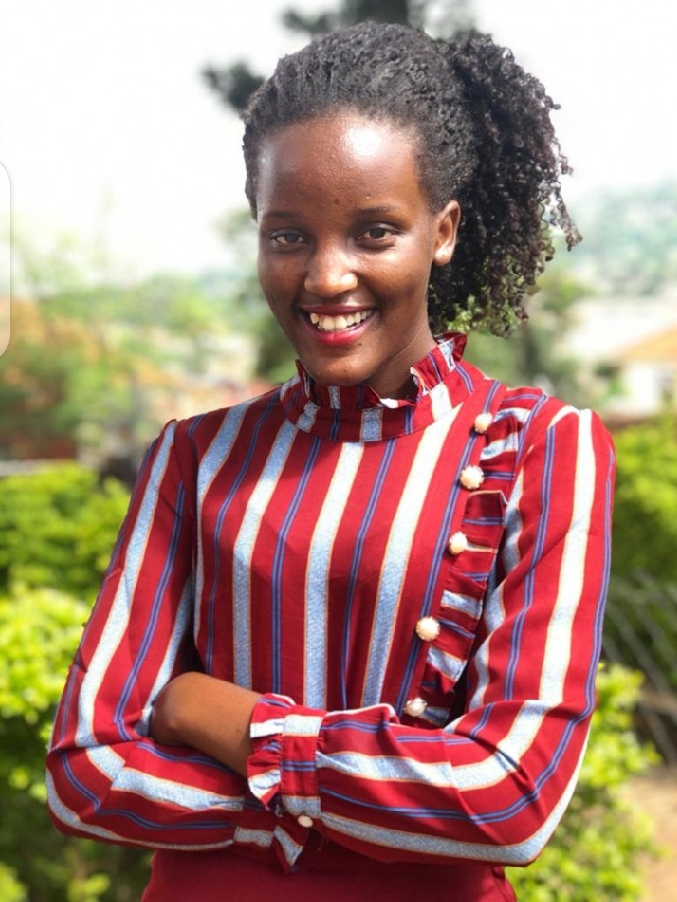
- Born: 15 November 1996 (age 29); Uganda
- Education: Makerere University Business School
- Years active: 2018–present
- Known for: Climate activism

Vanessa Nakate (born 15 November 1996) is a Ugandan climate justice activist. She gained international recognition for her climate activism in Uganda, where she began a solitary climate strike in January 2019.

Nakate is the founder of the Youth for Future Africa and the Rise Up Movement, and she has been a prominent voice at international forums such as the United Nations Climate Change Conference (COP25) and the World Economic Forum in Davos. Her work focuses on drawing attention to the impacts of climate change on African communities and advocating for renewable energy projects in Ugandan schools.

== Early life and education ==
Nakate grew up in the Ugandan capital, Kampala. She first gained recognition in December 2018 after expressing concern about the unusually high temperatures in her country. Nakate graduated with a business administration in marketing degree from Makerere University Business School. Nakate is a Christian.

Nakate is enrolled in the Master of Public Policy programme at the University of Oxford where her studies focus on climate justice and international environmental policy.

== Actions for the climate ==
Inspired by Greta Thunberg to start her own climate movement in Uganda, Nakate began a solitary strike against inaction on the climate crisis in January 2019. For several months she was the lone protester outside of the gates of the Parliament of Uganda. Eventually, other youth began to respond to her calls on social media for others to help draw attention to the plight of the Congolian rainforests. Nakate founded the Youth for Future Africa and the likewise Africa-based Rise Up Movement.

In December 2019, Nakate spoke at the COP25 gathering in Spain, together with the young climate activists Greta Thunberg and Alejandro Martínez.

In early January 2020, she joined around 20 other youth climate activists from around the world to publish a letter to participants at the World Economic Forum in Davos, calling on companies, banks and governments to immediately stop subsidizing fossil fuels. She was one of five international delegates invited by Arctic Basecamp to camp with them in Davos during the World Economic Forum; the delegates later joined a climate march on the last day of the Forum.

In October 2020, Nakate gave a speech at the Desmond Tutu International Peace Lecture urging world leaders to "wake up" and recognise climate change as a crisis, tying it to poverty, hunger, disease, conflict and violence against women and girls. "Climate change is a nightmare that affects every sector of our lives," she stated. "How can we eradicate poverty without looking at this crisis? How can we achieve zero hunger if climate change is leaving millions of people with nothing to eat? We are going to see disaster after disaster, challenge after challenge, suffering after suffering (...) if nothing is done about this." She called for leaders to "leave their comfort zones and see the danger we are in and do something about it. This is a matter of life and death."

Nakate started the Green Schools Project, a renewable energy initiative, which aims to transition schools in Uganda to solar energy and install eco-friendly stoves in these schools. As of now, the project has carried out installations in thirty schools.

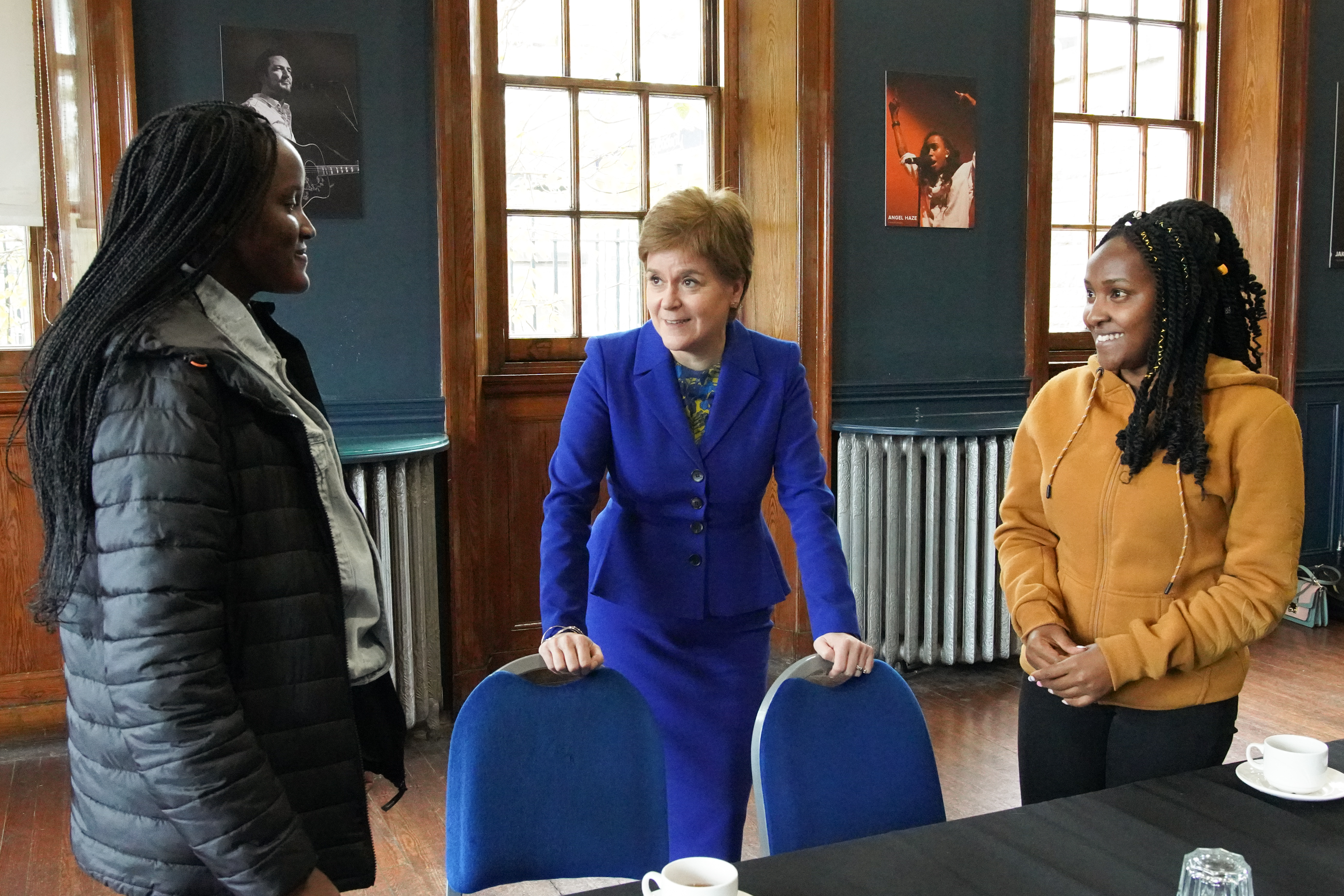
Conference on Loss and Damage in Scotland October 2022. From left to right: Nakate, Nicola Sturgeon and Elizabeth Wathyti.

On 9 July 2020, Nakate was interviewed by Angelina Jolie, hosted by TIME magazine, about the power and importance of African voices in the climate justice movement. In August, Jeune Afrique magazine named her among the top 100 most influential Africans. In August 2020, Vanessa Nakate joined former UN Secretary General Ban Ki-moon at the Forum Alpbach to discuss climate activism.

In September, Nakate spoke on a panel entitled "Sparking an Era of Transformational Climate Leadership" organised by the World Resources Institute. Nakate was announced by the United Nations as the SDG 13 Young Leader in 2020. She was featured among Okay Africa's 100 Women is an exclusive platform to pay homage to 100 women of excellence among the diaspora during Women's History Month. Nakate was mentioned among the most influential young Africans in 2020 by YouthLead. Nakate was a keynote speaker at the Berlin Energy Transition Dialogue 2021 on 16 March 2021 alongside other notable world leaders. Her delivery included criticism of the German Federal Foreign Office as organizers for screening the input from youth climate activists that was not applied to other invited speakers.

Writing in The Guardian in October 2021, Nakate argues that the countries and corporations largely responsible for green house emissions should compensate African countries and communities for the loss and damage arising from climate change that they are now suffering.

In a 2019 interview with Amy Goodman for Democracy Now!, Nakate expressed her motivation for climate action: "My country heavily depends on agriculture, therefore most of the people depend on agriculture. So, if our farms are destroyed by floods, if the farms are destroyed by droughts and crop production is less, that means that the price of food is going to go high. So it will only be the most privileged who will be able to buy food. And they are the biggest emitters in our countries, the ones who will be able to survive the crisis of food, whereas most of the people who live in villages and rural communities, they have trouble getting food because of the high prices. And this leads to starvation and death. Literally, in my county, a lack of rain means starvation and death for the less privileged".

She has been appointed as a UNICEF goodwill ambassador. Additionally, Nakate serves on the Malala Fund Board, supporting girls' education amid climate challenges. She also became a member of the Board of environmental NGO Global Witness in 2025.

Nakate considers the late Kenyan environmental activist Wangari Maathai, a Nobel Peace Prize winner, to be her role model.

== Political views ==
Nakate is on the council of the Progressive International, an international organisation promoting progressive, left-wing politics. She has criticised capitalism, linking it to environmental degradation.

As a Christian, she thinks, "Having dominion over the Earth is about responsibility and service to the planet and its people, because God is not a God of waste and exploitation."

== Omission from photo ==
In January 2020, the Associated Press (AP) news agency cropped Nakate out from a photo she appeared in featuring Greta Thunberg and activists Luisa Neubauer, Isabelle Axelsson, and Loukina Tille after they all attended the World Economic Forum. Nakate accused the media of a racist attitude. The Associated Press later changed the photo and indicated there was no ill intent, without presenting its apologies. On 27 January 2020, AP executive editor Sally Buzbee tweeted an apology using her personal account saying that she was sorry on behalf of the AP. Nakate responded that she did not believe the AP's statement or their apology, further responding: "As much as this incident has hurt me personally, I'm glad because it has brought more attention to activists in Africa. ... Maybe media will start paying attention to us not just when we're the victims of climate tragedies."

== Awards and recognition ==
Nakate and six other young activists were honoured at the 2020 Young Activists Summit during a live discussion on the post-COVID-19 world. The event brought together over 8,600 people from around 100 countries.

Nakate was on the list of the BBC's 100 Women announced on 23 November 2020.

She was also on the list "Time100 Next" published by TIME magazine on 17 February 2021, and was featured on the cover of TIME's 8–15 November 2021 issue.

Nakate currently serves on the board of the Malala Fund.

Other awards include:

- 2021 – Haub Law Environmental Award, presented by the Pace University School of Law
- 2022 – Helmut Schmidt Future Prize, presented by the Bundeskanzler-Helmut-Schmidt-Stiftung, Die Zeit and The New Institute
- 2022 - Appointed a UNICEF Goodwill Ambassador
- 2022 – Goalkeepers Campaign Award, presented by the Bill & Melinda Gates Foundation
- 2025 - Awarded Honorary Degree of Doctor of Science in Social Science by the University of Edinburgh

== Bibliography ==
- Nakate, Vanessa (28 October 2021). A bigger picture: my fight to bring a new African voice to the climate crisis. London, United Kingdom: Pan Macmillan. ISBN 978-0-3586-5450-6. Hardback edition indicated, 256 pages.
