= 2021 in Uganda =

- Decades: 2000s; 2010s; 2020s
- See also: Other events of 2021; Timeline of Ugandan history

Events in the year 2021 in Uganda.

== Incumbents ==
- President: Yoweri Museveni
- Vice President: Edward Ssekandi (until 21 June); Jessica Alupo onwards
- Prime Minister: Ruhakana Rugunda (until 21 June); Robinah Nabbanja onwards

=== January to June ===
- 7 January
  - Opposition leader Bobi Wine calls on the International Criminal Court (ICC) to investigate Ugandan President Yoweri Museveni and other senior government officials for human rights abuses leading up to the 2021 Ugandan general election.
  - Eighteen million people are registered to vote as campaigns wind up. At least 54 people have been killed since November 2020.
- 11 January – Presidential spokesman Don Wanyama accuses Facebook of interfering in the election after several accounts linked to President Museveni's campaign were removed for inauthentic behavior.
- 13 January – The United States cancels its observation of the elections, saying the voting will lack transparency and accountability.
- 14 January – 2021 Ugandan general election. Yoweri Museveni is declared the winner with 59% of the vote compared to 35% for Bobi Wine. Wine promises to present evidence of voter fraud and to challenge the election. Museveni had 5.85 million votes and Wine had 3.48 million votes; Vote turnout was 52%.
- 18 January – Internet service is restored in 90% of the country after a five-day blackout; Bobi Wine remains under house arrest since 15 January.
- 26 January – Troops withdraw from Bobi Wine′s home, but he remains under surveillance. Wine encourages peaceful protests but does not endorse a court challenge to the election result.
- 1 February – Bobi Wine files a motion in the Supreme Court to cancel the results of the January election.
- 3 February – Museveni suspends the multi-million dollar Democratic Governance Facility backed by European nations that supports local groups that promote democracy and good governance.
- 4 February – The ICC finds Dominic Ongwen, 45, of the Lord's Resistance Army (LRA) guilty of war crimes and crimes against humanity.
- 22 February – Bobi Wine withdraws his challenge to the presidential election, saying the Supreme Court is biased.
- 15 March
  - Bobi Wine is arrested at a protest in Kampala.
  - President Museveni, 76, says he has not yet been vaccinated against COVID-19, calling himself "careful".
- 1 June – Attempted assassination of Katumba Wamala

=== July to December ===
- 1 July –
  - Authorities reveal that the attackers who attempted to assassinate Ugandan general Katumba Wamala in Kampala were Islamic extremists who were trained in a jihadist camp in North Kivu, Democratic Republic of Congo, and had links with the Allied Democratic Forces and the Islamic State. Wamala was injured during the attack but survived, while his daughter and his driver were killed.
  - Uganda imposes a new tax rate for using the internet as the government orders a 12% excise duty on mobile data. President Yoweri Museveni defends the tax as he says that social media users are "endlessly donating money to foreign telephone companies through chatting or even lying" and described the use of social media as a "luxury". This tax proposal, which takes effect immediately, resulted in protests in 2018 and 2019.
- 29 July – Local human rights activists in Uganda petition President Yoweri Museveni not to sign a controversial bill against gay sex into law as it could increase discrimination and hate crimes and incite violence against gay men. The bill further criminalizes homosexuality by punishing "penetration of another person's anus" with up to 10 years' imprisonment. Richard Lusimbo, a 34-year-old activist, says that even people suspected of being gay will be attacked if the bill comes into effect.
- 16 August – In a unanimous decision, the Supreme Court of Uganda strikes down a 2014 law outlawing the distribution of pornography and wearing of "indecent" clothes as unconstitutional. Women's rights groups in the country campaigned against the law since its inception, saying it unfairly singled out women for discrimination.
- 27 August – Authorities in Uganda arrest an Islamist belonging to the ADF for planning a suicide bombing attack in the country. Police are also investigating if the murders of 21 civilians in the cities of Lwengo and Masaka since late July were carried out by ADF terrorists. The victims were killed by knifemen during raids in the night. Thirty-eight suspected have been arrested.
- 29 August – The Home Affairs Ministry of South Africa orders the release of two gay men who were arrested and imprisoned in Johannesburg after escaping Uganda. The couple requested to remain in South Africa out of fears of persecution in Uganda. The South Gauteng High Court ordered the immediate release of the men and also ordered that they be allowed to remain in South Africa.
- 10 September – A forum for the promotion of LGBT rights is hosted in Kigali, Rwanda, in order to address minority rights. At the forum, a Rwandan man describes being assaulted by family members when he came out as gay. The forum also documented and urged the governments of Tanzania, Uganda, Burundi and Kenya to decriminalize homosexuality and protect the minority.
- 22 September – Ugandan President Yoweri Museveni eases COVID-19-related restrictions, including allowing churches and many sports and social activities to resume, due to a decline in the number of infections. The President will also allow universities and other post-secondary education institutions to reopen on November 1.
- 23 October – 2021 Uganda bombings: One person is killed and three others injured when a bomb explodes in a bar in Kampala, Uganda. Three suspected terrorists are behind the attack.
- 24 October – IS claims responsibility for yesterday's bombing at a bar in Kampala, which killed one person and injured three others.
- 25 October – An explosion on a bus in Mpigi District kills one person and injures several others.
- 26 October – It is revealed that yesterday's explosion on a bus in Mpigi District was carried out by an ADF suicide bomber. The attacker was killed, and three other people were injured.
- 28 October – Ugandan President Yoweri Museveni announces that schools will be reopened in January after being closed for almost two years due to the pandemic, while the rest of the economy will be reopened in the same month.
- 29 October – Two children are killed by a bomb explosion at a village in Nakaseke District. The device looked like a jackfruit and was given to the children while they were playing.
- 16 November – Three suicide bombers blow themselves up near a police station and the entrance of the Parliament in Kampala, killing three people and injuring 33 others. The Islamic State claims responsibility for the attacks.
- 30 November – Uganda launches airstrikes against Allied Democratic Forces and Islamic State – Central Africa Province positions in eastern Democratic Republic of the Congo.
- 7 December – Uganda reports its first seven cases of the SARS-CoV-2 Omicron variant in travellers from four countries.
- 14 December – Ugandan politician Bobi Wine is placed under house arrest in Magere, Wakiso District.
- 20 December – The governments of Uganda and the Democratic Republic of the Congo reveal that they have captured 35 rebels and destroyed numerous enemy strongholds within the past week.
- 21 December - In the past three weeks, two police posts have been attacked at Ssekanyonyi in Mityana district and Nakasozi in Kiboga district where four police officers were killed by unknown armed men and their guns taken. Police spokesperson, Fred Enanga said following leads from the two attacks, operatives from Crime Intelligence and the Flying Squad unit raided Kabuusi swamp in Kassanda district where eight members were rounded up. The eight people admitted that this was a new group named Ugandan Coalition Forces of Change(UCFC) who aim was to change of government in Uganda using the power of the gun. According to security, the group recruited mainly from Wakiso district and later created two camps in Mityana from where they carried out the first attack on Ssekanyonyi police post after luring police officers into an ambush.

== Deaths ==
- 1 January – Paul Etyang, 82, politician, former Deputy Prime Minister and Minister of Foreign Affairs.
- 7 January – Wilberforce Kisamba Mugerwa, 75, agricultural economist and politician, COVID-19.
- 20 January – John Baptist Kaggwa, 77, Bishop of Roman Catholic Diocese of Masaka (1998–2019); COVID-19.
- 3 April – Cyprian Kizito Lwanga, 68, Archbishop of the Roman Catholic Archdiocese of Kampala.
- 6 May – John Ntegyereize, 74, Anglican prelate, bishop of Kinkiizi (1995–2010).
- 6 June – Betty Mpeka, 67, physician
- 11 June – Mujuzi Pius, 61, politician, MP (2001–2011)
- 15 June – Benon Magezi, 60, Anglican prelate, bishop of North Kigezi (since 2017)
- 16 June – Joel Otim, 49, Olympic sprinter (1992)
- 1 July – Noble Banadda, 46, chemical engineer
- 5 July – Aggrey Awori, 82, former athlete, economist, politician and diplomat.
- 21 August – Paul Lokech, 55, military officer, deputy inspector general of the National Police (since 2020)
- 5 September – Jonah Lwanga, 76, Orthodox prelate, metropolitan of Kampala and all Uganda (since 1997)
- 10 September – Bulaimu Muwanga Kibirige, 67, hotel executive
- 28 October – Florence Alice Lubega, 103, politician, MP (1962–1980)
- 2 November – Ali Fadhul, 81, military officer and convicted war criminal, chief of army staff (1979)

== See also ==
- International Conference on the Great Lakes Region
- COVID-19 pandemic in Africa
