= Isabelle Axelsson =

Swedish climate activist

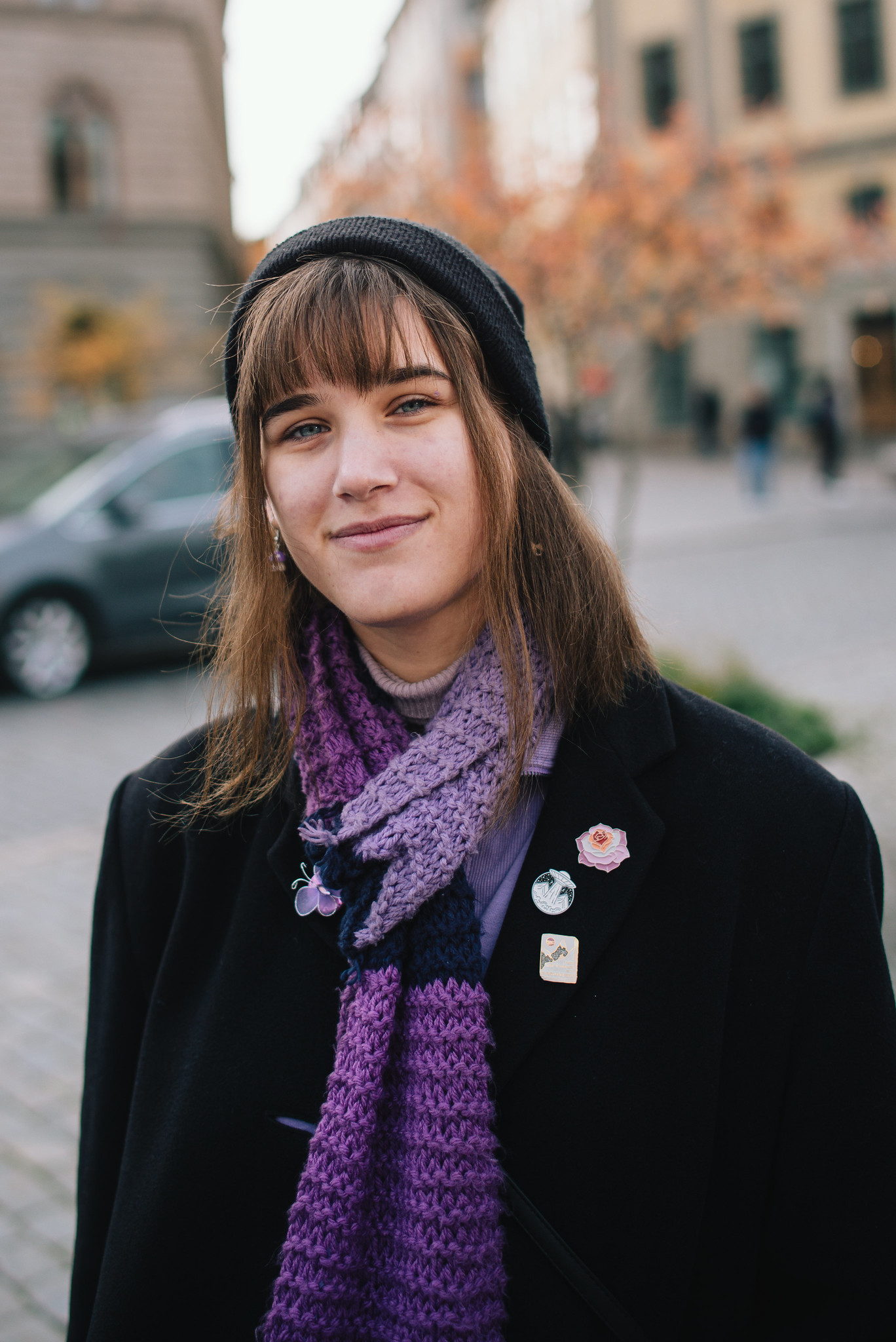
- Born: 14 January 2001 (age 25); Stockholm, Sweden
- Occupation: Climate activist
- Movement: Fridays for Future

Isabelle Axelsson (born 14 January 2001) is a Swedish climate activist from Stockholm.

== Biography ==
Axelsson has been an activist and an organiser of Fridays for Future Sweden since December 2018. In late January 2020, she attended the World Economic Forum in Davos along with other climate activists, namely Greta Thunberg, Luisa Neubauer, Loukina Tille and Vanessa Nakate.

She was the contributor to a book titled "Gemeinsam für die Zukunft – Fridays For Future und Scientists For Future: Vom Stockholmer Schulstreik zur weltweiten Klimabewegung". In the book, she contributed with details from within Fridays for Future, to give the reader a perspective from someone within Fridays for Future.

Axelsson has autism.
