= 2019 in Uganda =

- Decades: 1990s; 2000s; 2010s; 2020s
- See also: Other events of 2019; Timeline of Ugandan history

Events in the year 2019 in Uganda.

== Incumbents ==
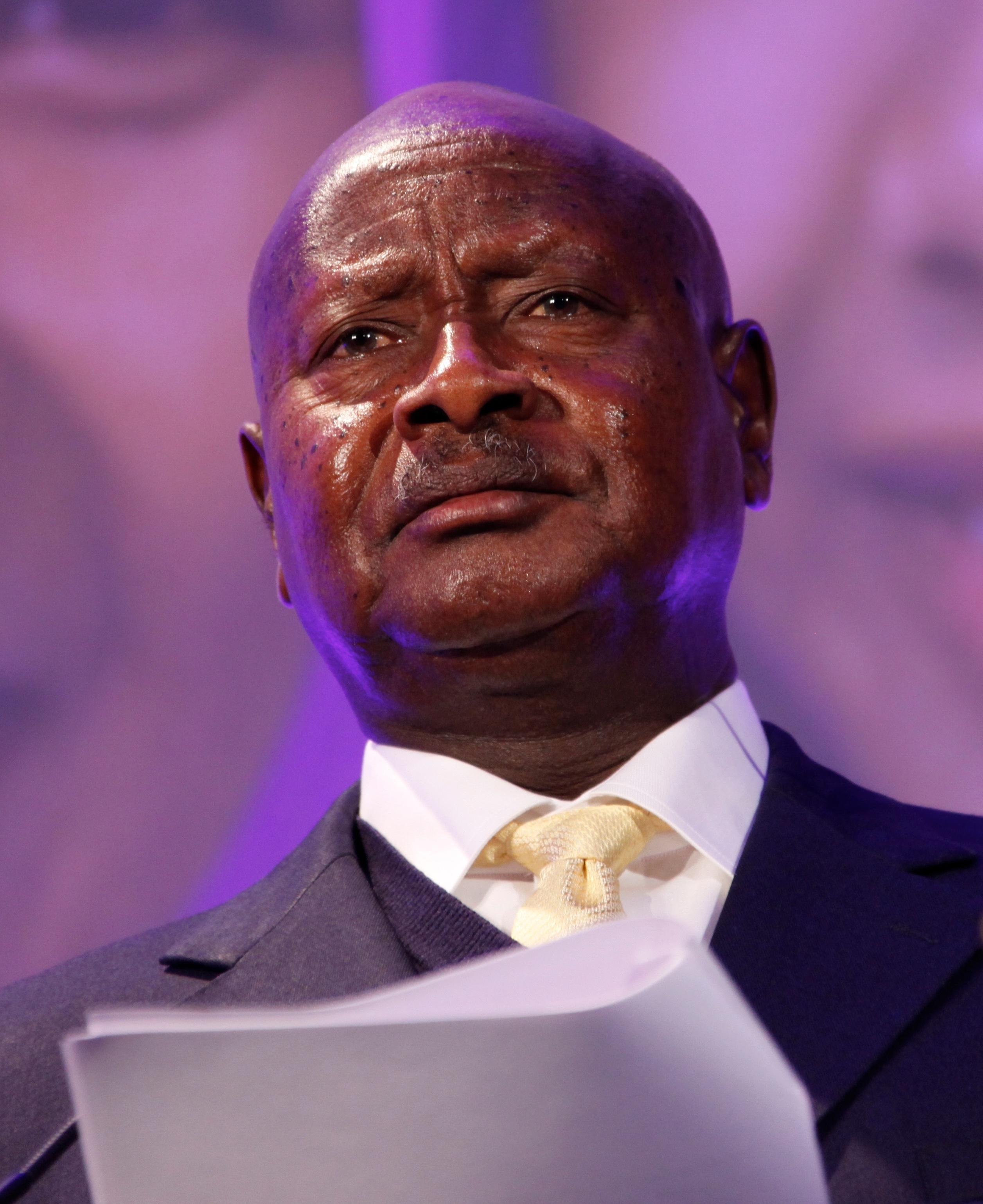
Yoweri Museveni

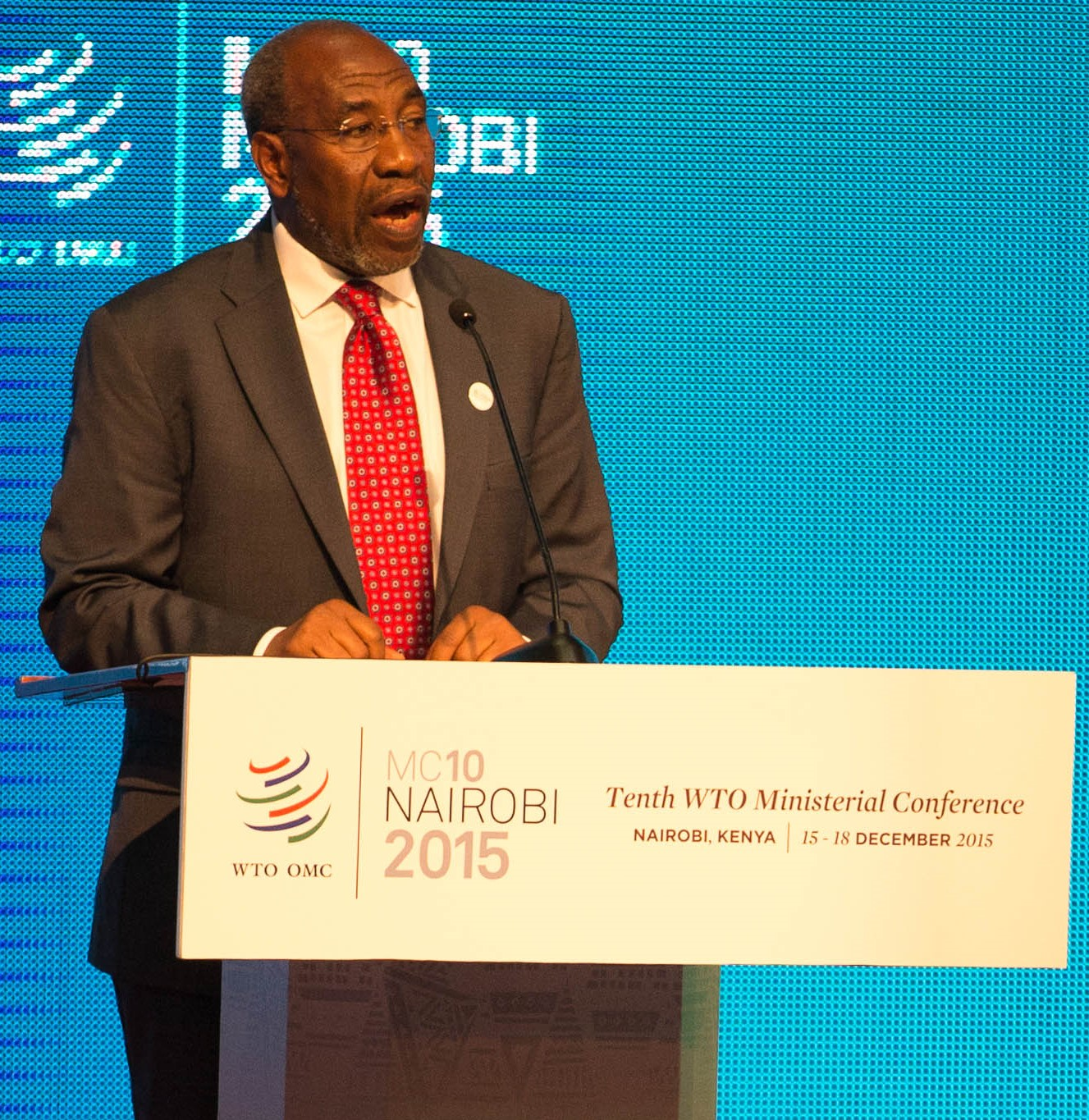
Ruhakana Rugunda

- President: Yoweri Museveni
- Vice President: Edward Ssekandi
- Prime Minister: Ruhakana Rugunda

== Events ==
- Killing of Brian Wasswa. LGBTI+ activist and paralegal (b. 1991). He was murdered in his home on 5th October 2019.

== Deaths ==
- 1 January – Stephen Twinoburyo, mathematician (b. 1970).
- 10 March – Christine Alalo, police officer and peacekeeper (b. 1970).
- 21 March – Franco Wanyama, boxer (b. 1968)
