= 1993 in Uganda =

- Decades: 1970s; 1980s; 1990s; 2000s; 2010s
- See also: Other events of 1993; Timeline of Ugandan history

The following lists events that happened during 1993 in Uganda.

== Incumbents ==
- President: Yoweri Museveni
- Vice President: Samson Kisekka
- Prime Minister: George Cosmas Adyebo

== Events ==
- date unknown
  - Kibale Forest becomes a national park.
  - NACWOLA (National Community of Women Living with HIV/AIDS) is founded by Beatrice Were.

== Births ==
- January 1 - Alengot Oromait, Ugandan politician
