= 2023 in Uganda =

- Decades: 2000s; 2010s; 2020s
- See also: Other events of 2023; Timeline of Ugandan history

Events in the year 2023 in Uganda.

== Incumbents ==
- President: Yoweri Museveni
- Vice president: Jessica Alupo
- Prime minister: Robinah Nabbanja

== Events ==
Ongoing — COVID-19 pandemic in Uganda

- 1 January – At least nine people are killed and many others are injured during a stampede at a music show in Kampala.
- 6 January – At least 16 people are killed and 21 others are injured in a bus crash en route to the city of Gulu from Kampala, in northern Uganda.
- 8 January – Twenty-one people are killed and 49 others injured when a bus heading for Nairobi, Kenya, crashes after crossing the border from Uganda.
- 11 January – Ugandan Health Minister Jane Aceng declares an end to the outbreak of Sudan ebolavirus in the country that has killed 77 people since September.
- 9 March – The parliament of Uganda begins debate on a proposed bill that would criminalize people identifying as part of the LGBTQ community with up to 10 years in prison. The bill would also criminalize the "promotion" of homosexuality and "abetting" or "conspiring" to engage in same-sex relations.
- 21 March – The parliament of Uganda approves the Anti-Homosexuality Bill, which includes the death sentence for "aggravated homosexuals" (definition which includes those who are convicted of homosexuality more than once and those who engage in homosexual sex with a person older than 75 or with a disabled person) and imprisonment for up to 20 years for "promoters of homosexuality".
- 13 April – The Ugandan military kills notorious criminal Tom Lopusi, who led a massive jailbreak in Moroto District in September 2020.
- 21 April – President Yoweri Museveni sends the Anti-Homosexuality Bill back to Parliament for reconsideration.
- 2 May – Charles Engola is shot and killed by his bodyguard.
- 3 May – 2023 Rwanda and Uganda floods
- 29 May – Ugandan President Yoweri Museveni signs the Anti-Homosexuality Bill into law which introduces the death penalty for "aggravated homosexuality" and a sentence of 20 years in prison for the "promotion of homosexuality".
- 16 June – ADF militants attacked a secondary school in Mpondwe, killing at least 41, including 38 students. Of the 38, 20 were girls who were hacked to death, while 18 while boys who died during the arson. The assailants also abducted at least six students, most of them girls.
- 19 June – 20 people accused of helping ISIS-linked rebel group ADF in the Mpondwe secondary school attack are arrested.
- 21 June – Uganda military rescued three of the six students abducted in the Mpondwe school massacre.
- 8 August – Twenty people are killed, five are missing and nine others are rescued after a boat carrying charcoal and food capsized in the Ugandan waters of Lake Victoria.
- 17 October – Two tourists from the United Kingdom and South Africa and a tour guide are killed during a shooting at the Queen Elizabeth National Park in Uganda by Allied Democratic Forces gunmen.
- 1 November – The Ugandan military announces the capture of an Allied Democratic Forces commander who killed three people, including two tourists, in Queen Elizabeth National Park on October 17.
- 18 December – Five people are killed as Allied Democratic Forces gunmen open fire in a restaurant in Kamwenge District.

== Deaths ==
- 10 January – Sezi Mbaguta, 76, politician, MP (2011–2016).
- 4 March – John Nagenda, 84, cricketer (East Africa, national team).
- 5 April – Albert Edward Baharagate Akiiki, 93, Roman Catholic prelate, bishop of Hoima (1969–1991).
- 2 May – Charles Engola, 64, politician and retired military officer.
- 7 June – Kato Lubwama, 52, filmmaker, musician, and politician, MP (2016–2021).
- 17 June – Stella Arach-Amoko, 69, judge, justice of the Supreme Court (since 2013).
- 18 July – Paul Kamuza Bakyenga, 79, Roman Catholic prelate, bishop (1991–1999) and archbishop (1999–2020) of Mbarara.
- 18 October – Henry Kyemba, 84, politician, minister of health (1974–1977)
- 18 November – Joyce Mpanga, 89, politician, member of the Parliament of Uganda (1996–2001) and Lukiiko (since 2009), minister of state for primary education (1989–1992).
- 31 December – Benjamin Kiplagat, 34, Olympic long-distance runner (2008, 2012, 2016).

== See also ==
- International Conference on the Great Lakes Region
- COVID-19 pandemic in Africa
