= 2022 in Uganda =

- Decades: 2000s; 2010s; 2020s
- See also: Other events of 2022; Timeline of Ugandan history

Events in the year 2022 in Uganda.

== Incumbents ==
- President: Yoweri Museveni
- Vice President: Jessica Alupo
- Prime Minister: Robinah Nabbanja

== Events ==
Ongoing — COVID-19 pandemic in Uganda

- 10 January – Uganda reopens schools for the first time since March 2020 after a nearly two-year closure due to the COVID-19 pandemic.
- 28 January – The Rwandan foreign ministry announces the reopening of the country's border crossing with Uganda following political tensions between the two countries that led to the closure of the border crossing for three years.
- 4 May – Twenty people are killed when a bus crashes into a tea estate in Fort Portal.
- 24 May – Ugandan police arrest veteran opposition politician Kizza Besigye for "inciting violence" and also disperse a crowd protesting against the government.
- 8 June – Uganda reports its first suspected case of monkeypox.
- 1 August – Twenty-four people are killed by heavy flooding in eastern Uganda.
- 7 September – 2022 Kasese District landslides: Fifteen people are killed by landslides caused by heavy rain in Kasese District.
- 20 September – 2022 Uganda Ebola outbreak: Uganda reports an outbreak of Ebola after a rare case of the Sudan ebolavirus strain was confirmed in a 24-year-old man who later died, becoming the first known fatality from the strain since 2011.
- 17 October – 2022 Uganda Ebola outbreak: President Yoweri Museveni places the capital city of Kampala under high Ebola response alert after two non-native patients reached the city, one of whom died, amid an outbreak of the disease in the country.
- 25 October – Eleven people, including children, are killed and six others are injured in a fire at a school for the blind in Mukono District.

== Deaths ==
- 23 January – Emmanuel Tumusiime-Mutebile, 72, economist and banker, governor of the Bank of Uganda (since 2001).
- 29 January – Simon Lokodo, 64, politician.
- 20 March – Jacob Oulanyah, 56, politician, speaker of the parliament (since 2021).
- 24 March – Denis Kiwanuka Lote, 84, Roman Catholic prelate, bishop of Kotido (1991–2007) and archbishop of Tororo (2007–2014).
- 28 June – Christine Dranzoa, 55, academic administrator and biologist.
- 30 July – Martin Luluga, 89, Roman Catholic prelate, auxiliary bishop (1986–1990) and bishop (1990–1999) of Gulu and bishop of Nebbi (1999–2011).
- 12 August – Jessica Eriyo, 52, social worker, politician and diplomat, MP (2001–2011) and minister of the environment (2006–2011), cancer.
- 25 August – Elly Tumwine, 68, Ugandan military officer and politician, MP (since 1986).

== See also ==
- International Conference on the Great Lakes Region
- COVID-19 pandemic in Africa
