= Adejoke Lasisi =

Nigeria fashion designer

- Born: 14 August 1986 (age 39); Ibadan
- Occupation: Fashion designer
- Known for: Converting waste to adornments
- Children: 1

Adejoke Lasisi is a Nigerian fashion designer, and environmentalist known for her development of fashion products and designs using nylon and textile wastes. She is the founder and CEO of Planet 3R and Jokelinks Weaving School.

Using more than 4,000 discarded pure water sachets, Adejoke transformed plastic waste that once polluted the environment into a striking dress. The piece deliberately contrasts its humble origin with its refined outcome, challenging conventional ideas of fashion, value, and sustainability.

== Early life and education ==
Adejoke started weaving at 9 with her parents. She later attended Obafemi Awolowo University lle-lfe, where she obtained a bachelor's degree in Economics. She also has a certificate in Entrepreneurial Management from Enterprise Development Center in Lagos Nigeria.

== Awards and recognition ==
In July 2020, Adejoke won the Micro Small and Medium Enterprises (MSMEs) of the Year Award, an event which was well attended by state governors and ministers. She was recognized and celebrated by President Muhammadu Buhari as a youth innovator at the maiden celebration of the National Youth Day on 1 November 2020.

She also won the Eleven Eleven Twelve Foundation's Africa Green Grant Award on 14 November 2020 at the second edition for her actions to improve the environment.
