= 1971 in Uganda =

- Decades: 1950s; 1960s; 1970s; 1980s; 1990s
- See also: Other events of 1971; Timeline of Ugandan history

The following lists events that happened during 1971 in Uganda.

== Incumbents ==
- President: Milton Obote (until January 25), Idi Amin (starting January 25)
- Vice President: John Babiiha (until January), vacant (starting January)

== Events ==
=== January ===
- January 25 – 1971 Ugandan coup d'état: Idi Amin deposes Milton Obote in a coup, and becomes President.
