= 2017 in Uganda =

- Decades: 1990s; 2000s; 2010s; 2020s
- See also: Other events of 2017; Timeline of Ugandan history

This article lists events from the year 2017 in Uganda.

== Incumbents ==
- President: Yoweri Museveni
- Vice President: Edward Ssekandi
- Prime Minister: Ruhakana Rugunda

== Events ==
- 21-31 May – The 2017 ICC World Cricket League Division Three occurs in Uganda

== Deaths ==
- 4 February – Margaret Mungherera, psychiatrist and medical administrator (b. 1957).

== Links ==
Media related to 2017 in Uganda at Wikimedia Commons
