= Beatrice Were =

Ugandan AIDS activist

Beatrice Were (born circa 1966) is a Ugandan AIDS activist.

== Early life ==
Beatrice Were married her husband, Francis, at age 19. She was a virgin at the time of her common-law wedding.

She discovered that she was HIV-positive after her husband died of AIDS-related meningitis in September 1991. At the time of her husband's death, Were was a 22-year-old university graduate with two young daughters. With the help of a Kampala-based group of women lawyers, she successfully gained control of her husband's estate and retained custody of her children, and moved into a small building in her father's compound.

== Activism ==
One of Africa's highest-profile AIDS activists, Beatrice Were has become known for her strongly worded criticism of U.S. global AIDS policy. She has served as national coordinator of NACWOLA, and as the Executive Coordinator of the International Community of Women Living with HIV/AIDS, Uganda.

In 1993, Beatrice Were co-founded the non-governmental organization National Community of Women Living with AIDS (NACWOLA) to unite Ugandan women living with HIV and to improve the quality of their lives. In 1995, Were publicly revealed her HIV-positive status during a speech at a conference in Kampala.

She founded the Memory Book Project in the late 1990s, which "encourages HIV-positive parents to prepare their children for bereavement by recording family memories in an album".

Were has called attention to the failures of Uganda's HIV/AIDS policies and programs since 2004, in coordination with Human Rights Watch. She has specifically called out United States' funding of abstinence until marriage approaches to HIV/AIDS and sex education.

Her speech at the XVI International AIDS Conference in Toronto in 2006, in which she attacked the "ABC" (abstain, be faithful, wear condoms) approach to HIV prevention, received a standing ovation. By November 2006, she was ActionAid Uganda's National Coordinator for HIV/AIDS.

In 2007, Were criticized a government decision to stop distributing female condoms.

In 2013, Were was the CEO of Ka Tutandike Uganda, an NGO focused on child welfare.

== Awards ==
Were was awarded InterAction Humanitarian Award in 2003. In 2005, she was awarded the Human Rights Defender Award, the highest honor bestowed by Human Rights Watch.
