= 2022 Kasese District landslides =

Disaster in Uganda in 2022

- Part of 2022 Africa floods
- Date: 6 September - 7 September 2022
- Location: Kasese District, Uganda; 00°11′N 30°05′E
- Cause: Heavy rainfall
- Deaths: 15
- Injuries: 7
- Missing: 18

2022 Kasese District landslides
- Date: 6–7 September 2022
- Location: Kasika village, Busongora South County, Kasese District, Uganda
- Cause: Heavy rainfall
- Deaths: 15-16
- Property damage: Multiple homes destroyed

On the night of 6 and 7 September 2022, 15 people were killed when heavy rain caused multiple landslides in the Kasese District of Uganda.

Heavy rainfall was to blame for the landslide. The hilly area is remote and particularly vulnerable to landslides.

The Uganda Red Cross Society have confirmed that the majority of deaths were mothers and children. At least 18 people were declared missing and at least 7 injured and taken to hospital.

Several homes were destroyed and multiple people were buried alive, with rescue efforts focusing on those still trapped underneath.

After the tragedy, plans were underway that same afternoon to transfer the bodies to Kasika primary school for postmortems and burial arrangements.

The event was one of a series of recent floods in Western Uganda and one of many in Africa in 2022.
