= 1998 in Uganda =

- Decades: 1970s; 1980s; 1990s; 2000s; 2010s
- See also: Other events of 1998; Timeline of Ugandan history

The following lists events that happened during 1998 in Uganda.

== Incumbents ==
- President: Yoweri Museveni
- Vice President: Specioza Kazibwe
- Prime Minister: Kintu Musoke

== Events ==
=== August ===
- August 6 - Fighting spreads across the Democratic Republic of the Congo and on borders with Rwanda, Uganda and Tanzania. Rwanda continues to deny involvement with the rebels and a summit is held in Zimbabwe discussing the conflict.
- August 10 - Military experts from Namibia, Zimbabwe, Zambia and Tanzania are due in Kinshasa later this week to investigate allegations of Rwandan and Ugandan troops being sent across the border.
- August 21 - South African President Nelson Mandela calls for a summit over the Congo conflict on Saturday, inviting the leaders of DRC, Rwanda, Uganda and Zimbabwe to come.
