= 2018 in Uganda =

- Decades: 1990s; 2000s; 2010s; 2020s
- See also: Other events of 2018; Timeline of Ugandan history

The following events occurred in Uganda in the year 2018.

== Incumbents ==
- President: Yoweri Museveni
- Vice President: Edward Ssekandi
- Prime Minister: Ruhakana Rugunda

== Events ==
- February - Flood kills at least 45 people.
- 25 May – Bus accident left 22 people dead and another 15 were injured.
- 16 August - Arrest of opposition leader MP Bobi Wine
- 11 October - At least 41 people are killed after a river bursts its bank in Bududa, Uganda. Many more are injured and dozens are displaced.

== Deaths ==
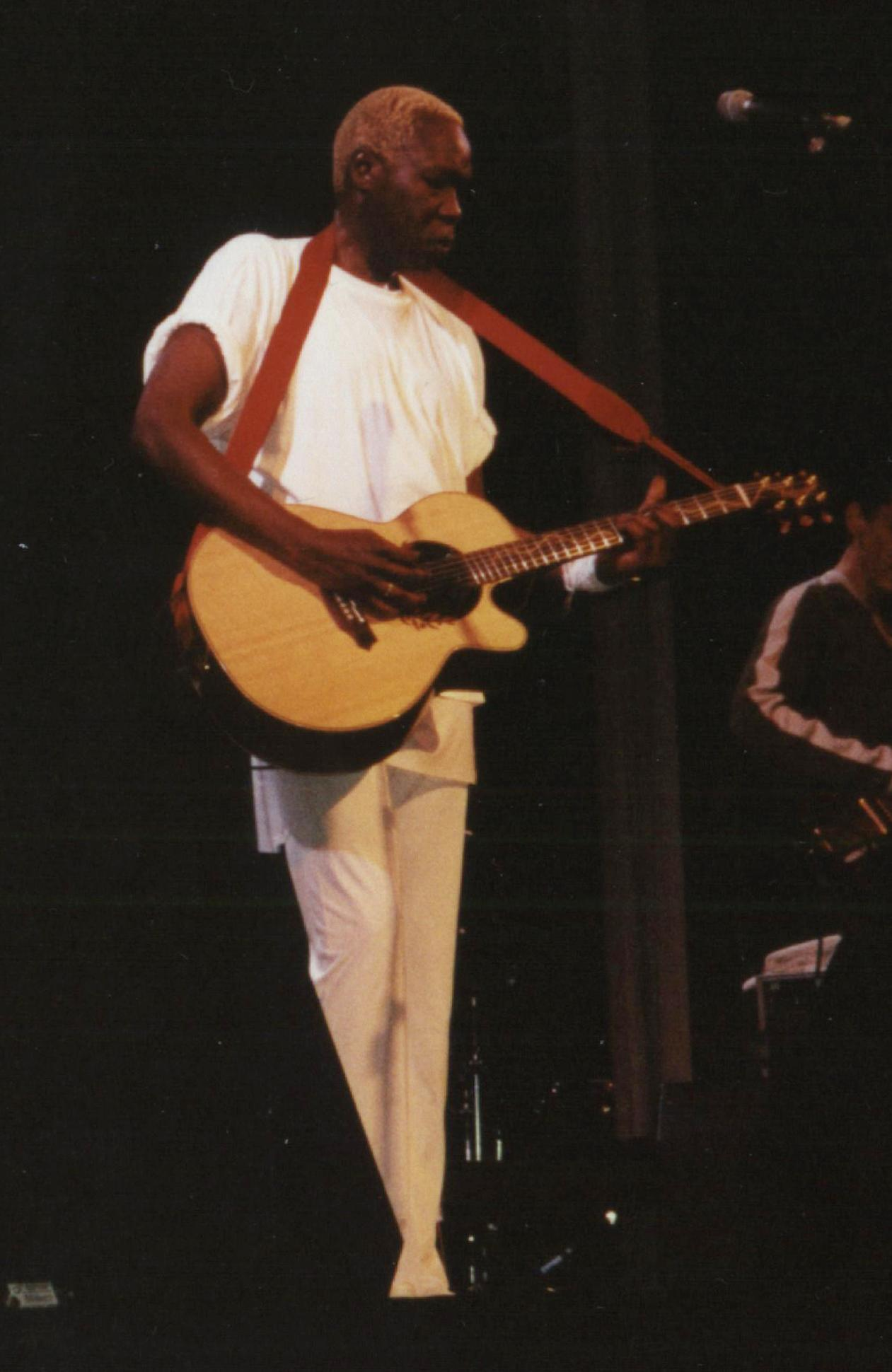
Geoffrey Oryema in 2001

- 5 January – Livingstone Mpalanyi Nkoyoyo, Anglican prelate, Archbishop of Uganda (b. 1938).
- 8 January – James Makumbi, physician and politician (b. 1942)
- 1 February – Mowzey Radio, musician (b. 1985)
- 22 June – Geoffrey Oryema, musician (b. 1953).
