= 2005 in Uganda =

- Decades: 1980s; 1990s; 2000s; 2010s; 2020s
- See also: Other events of 2005; Timeline of Ugandan history

The following lists events that happened during 2005 in Uganda.

== Incumbents ==
- President: Yoweri Museveni
- Vice President: Gilbert Bukenya
- Prime Minister: Apolo Nsibambi

== Events ==
=== October ===
- October 2 - Uganda Army is deploying troops to West Nile in readiness for an imminent military combat against the Lord's Resistance Army at the border with the Democratic Republic of Congo.
- October 4 - Four Ugandan civilians have been killed in a rare afternoon ambush on a pickup truck in north east Uganda by Lord's Resistance Army rebels. The insurgents are suspected of shooting the driver and two passengers and killing a fourth with an axe.
- October 6 - Five leaders of the Lord's Resistance Army are targeted by the first arrest warrants to be issued by the International Criminal Court.
- October 8 - Uganda Human Rights Commission, in its 2004 report, states that at least 4,000 children who were among the tens of thousands abducted by the Lord's Resistance Army rebels cannot be traced. It accuses the Uganda People's Defence Forces (UPDF) of torturing civilians in the north by using brutal methods to extract information or to instill discipline in suspects.
- October 10 - The former President of Uganda, Milton Obote, has died of kidney failure at the age of 80. Obote led the East African country from 1962-1971 and again from 1980-1985.
- October 14 - The Lord's Resistance Army rebel leader, Joseph Kony, has been indicted on 33 charges before the International Criminal Court (ICC) for crimes against humanity.
- October 18 - The Uganda People's Defence Force and Sudanese People's Liberation Army have launched a joint operation against the Lord's Resistance Army rebels, after the LRA ambushed a convoy of UPDF soldiers on October 14.

=== November ===
- November 5 - Scientists at Makerere University have approved the use of DDT to fight Malaria.
- November 11 - A sharp rise in examination fees sparks riot at Makerere University in Kampala.
- November 15 - Police clash with rioters in Kampala. During the riots, one man is killed. The riots were sparked by the arrest of opposition leader Kizza Besigye.
