= 2000 in Uganda =

- Decades: 1980s; 1990s; 2000s; 2010s; 2020s
- See also: Other events of 2000; Timeline of Ugandan history

Events in the year 2000 in Uganda.

== Incumbents ==
- President: Yoweri Museveni
- Vice President: Specioza Kazibwe
- Prime Minister: Apolo Nsibambi

== Events ==
- 17 March – The Movement for the Restoration of the Ten Commandments of God kills over 700 of its members inside a church compound in Kanungu after the movement's failed prophecy of the apocalypse did not materialize on 1 January 2000.
- 29 June – 2000 Ugandan multi-party referendum is held.
- Uganda National Academy of Sciences is established

== Births ==
- 12 March – Stephani Nampiina, cricketer
