= Stephen Twinoburyo =

Ugandan mathematician

- Mucunguzi
- Born: 8 January 1970; Mbarara, Uganda
- Died: 1 January 2019 (aged 48); South Africa
- Resting place: Kakoba, Mbarara
- Education: Makerere University University of Pretoria
- Alma mater: University of South Africa
- Children: Three
- Scientific career
- Fields: Mathematics Science Politics
- Institutions: Scimatics Solutions

Stephen Twinoburyo (8 January 1970 – 1 January 2019) was a Ugandan scientist, mathematician, lecturer, and entrepreneur. He was the CEO of Scimatic Solutions, a South African company which helps students with maths and science tuition.

== Early life and education ==
Twinoburyo was born on 8 January 1970, in Mbarara, Uganda. He was the second of seven children, and his father worked as a town clerk. He attended Ntare School and was head prefect there in 1989.

In 1990, he started studying engineering at Makerere University, and relocated to South Africa. During his time there, he was chairman of Lumumba Hall. He later studied mathematics as a part-time degree at the University of South Africa, completing the course in 2007.

== Career ==
In 1994, Twinoburyo visited Soweto, South Africa, and it inspired him to move to the country in 1997. He lectured at the University of Pretoria, and taught in colleges in Pretoria and Cape Town.

In 2008, Twinoburyo decided to found Uganda Professionals Living in South Africa (AUPSA), and worked as their chairman. In 2009, he organised a meeting of Ugandan expatriates in South Africa. The meeting was held in Sandton, South Africa. AUPSA was set up to connect Ugandan expatriates living in South Africa. Twinoburyo also worked for the Ugandan Civil Alliance Network.

In 2010, Twinoburyo said that Ugandans were unhappy about the ticket prices for the 2010 FIFA World Cup in South Africa. In 2011, he condemned alleged human rights abuses in Uganda, and asked South African president Jacob Zuma not to attend the inauguration of Ugandan president Yoweri Museveni.

In 2014, Twinoburyo set up and became the CEO of Scimatic Solutions, a South African company which helps students with maths and science tuition. He was inspired to set up the company after visiting the California Science Center and National Air and Space Museum in Washington, D.C. The company is based in Hatfield, Pretoria.

== Personal life ==
Twinoburyo and his wife had three children. He died in South Africa on 1 January 2019 of a heart attack, one week before his 49th birthday. His body was repatriated to Uganda.
