= 1999 in Uganda =

- Decades: 1970s; 1980s; 1990s; 2000s; 2010s
- See also: Other events of 1999; Timeline of Ugandan history

The following lists events that happened during 1999 in Uganda.

== Incumbents ==
- President: Yoweri Museveni
- Vice President: Specioza Kazibwe
- Prime Minister: Kintu Musoke (until April 5), Apolo Nsibambi (starting April 5)

== Events ==
=== March ===
- A group of 14 tourists looking for mountain gorillas in Bwindi National Park are attacked and kidnapped by Interahamwe. Eight of the tourists are killed.

=== April ===
- April 20 - Uganda downplays an agreement in Libya to end the Second Congo War.

== Births ==
- 21 May – Rita Musamali, cricketer
