= Noble Banadda =

Biosystem engineer, academic (1975-2021)

Professor Noble Banadda
- Born: 14 May 1975; Uganda
- Died: 1 July 2021 (aged 46); Kampala, Uganda
- Education: Sokoine University of Agriculture (Bachelor of Science in Food Science and Technology); Katholieke Universiteit Leuven (Master of Science in Process Engineering) (Doctor of Philosophy in chemical engineering); Massachusetts Institute of Technology (Post-doctoral fellowship)
- Occupations: Agricultural & biosystems engineer, researcher and academic
- Years active: 2003—2021
- Title: Head of Agricultural and Biosystems Engineering at Makerere University

Noble Banadda (14 May 1975 – 1 July 2021) was a Ugandan biosystems engineer, researcher and academic, who was a professor of biosystems engineering at Makerere University, Uganda's largest and oldest public university. He was appointed a full professor in 2012 at age 37, one of the youngest persons in the history of the university to attain full professorship.

He died from complications of COVID-19 Kampala, Uganda, on 1 July 2021.

== Early life and education ==
Banadda was born in Kampala, Uganda's capital city on 14 May 1975. After attending local primary and secondary schools, he was admitted to Sokoine University of Agriculture, in Morogoro, Tanzania, graduating with a Bachelor of Science in Food Science and Technology.

His Master of Science degree in process engineering, together with his Doctor of Philosophy degree in chemical engineering, were both obtained from Katholieke Universiteit Leuven, in Leuven, Belgium. Later he studied in a post-doctoral fellowship at the Massachusetts Institute of Technology, in the United States.

He was the first sub-Saharan African person to graduate with a PhD in chemical engineering from the Katholieke Universiteit-Leuven in Belgium. Banadda was a visiting research fellow at the University of Cambridge, United Kingdom.

== Career ==
Banadda had a trailblazing scientific career. He was hired by Makerere University, serving in the Department of Agricultural and Biosystems Engineering, in the College of Agricultural and Environmental Sciences. In 2012, he was appointed a full professor at age 37.

Noble was the first African recipient of the Pius XI Golden Medal (2018) awarded by Pope Francis in Vatican (http://www.xn--academiadascincias 6wb.va/content/accademia/en/about/medal.html); a laureate of the Next Einstein Fellowship (https://nef.org/fellow/noble-banadda); Oliver Reginald Tambo Research Chair (https://www.nrf.ac.za/media-room/news/ortarchi-meet-team-aiming-contribute-transforming-african-research-landscape); honoured young scientist at the World Economic Forum; alumni of the Global Young Academy (2013 -2018) (https://globalyoungacademy.net/noble-banadda/); Member of the Malabo Panel of Experts (www.mamopanel.org); fellow of the Uganda National Academy of Sciences; council member of the Pan African Society for Agricultural Engineering (www.pasae.org.za); Member of the Makerere University Senate; adjunct professor at Iowa State University (US) (https://www.engineering.iastate.edu/people/affiliation/faculty/page/5/); research fellow at Clare Hall at University of Cambridge (UK); college member of the UKRI GCRF programme. Noble was full-time professor and chair of the department of Agricultural and Bio-Systems Engineering (ABE) at Makerere University (Uganda).

His research focus areas were in the biosystems engineering field and include mathematical modelling of biological systems and interactions. His goal was to create value-added products from solid biowaste resources.

== Other consideration ==
Noble was favourably cited with thus far published research findings in over 240 peer-reviewed journal scientific publications. He also (co)-supervised 12 PhD students to completion and 31 M.Sc. students.

== See also ==
- Nelson Sewankambo
- Philippa Ngaju Makobore
- Makerere University
