= Sezi Mbaguta =

Ugandan politician (1946–2023)

- Born: 19 February 1946; Protectorate of Uganda
- Died: 10 January 2023 (aged 76); Nakasero, Uganda
- Citizenship: Uganda
- Education: Makerere University (Diploma in Public Administration) (Bachelor of Arts) (Master of Arts)
- Occupations: Administrator & Politician
- Years active: 1975 — present
- Known for: Politics
- Title: State Minister of Public Service

Sezi Prisca Bessy Mbaguta (19 February 1946 – 10 January 2023) was a Ugandan politician and civil servant. She was the State Minister for Public Service in the Ugandan Cabinet. She was appointed to that position in June 2006. In the cabinet reshuffle of 16 February 2009, and that of 27 May 2011, she retained her cabinet portfolio. Mbaguta is the elected Member of Parliament for Rukungiri District Women's Representative.

== Background and education ==
Mbaguta was born on 19 February 1946 in Rukungiri District. Mbaguta had a Bachelor of Arts degree in political science and public administration from Makerere University, the oldest of Uganda's public and private universities. She also held a postgraduate Diploma in Public Administration, also from Makerere, obtained in 1975. Her degree of Master of Arts in public administration and management was obtained in 1997, also from Makerere University.

== Career ==
Mbaguta had a long and extensive public service career, starting in 1975, when she worked as the senior personnel officer, in the Public Service Commission, a position she held until 1980. Between 1980 and 1983, she served as the principal personnel officer in the Public Service Commission, and as the chief personnel officer in the Ministry of Public Services, from 1983 until 1990.

In 1990, she served briefly as the deputy secretary to Public Service Review Commission. Later that year, she was appointed to become Commissioner of Personnel Management, in the Ministry of Public Service, serving in that capacity until 1996. Between 1992 and 1996, she served as the Project Coordinator of the Civil Service Reform Implementation Project (CSRIP). From 1996 until 1999, she served as the Acting Director, Human Resource Management, in the Ministry of Public Service. In 1997, her title changed to Project Manager and Coordinator, Developing Human Resource & Regulatory Framework, in the same ministry. She held that title until 2006. During the same period, she concurrently served as the Director of Human Resource Management in the Ministry of Public Service. She was appointed to her final cabinet post in June 2006.

== Personal life and death ==
Mbaguta was married. She was reported to enjoy gender and women issues, as well as promoting rural development.

Mbaguta died on 10 January 2023, at the age of 76.

== See also ==
- Parliament of Uganda
- Cabinet of Uganda
- Rukungiri District
