= Kasirye Ggwanga =

Ugandan general (1952–2020)

Major General Kasirye Ggwanga
- Born: 26 August 1952; Mubende District, Uganda Protectorate
- Died: 9 June 2020 (aged 68); Nakasero Hospital, Kampala
- Occupation: Military officer
- Years active: 1972 – 2018
- Known for: Military
- Notable work: He was well respected for his fight towards environmental protection.

Major General Kasirye Ggwanga (26 August 1952 – 9 June 2020), was a Ugandan military officer in the Uganda People's Defence Force. He was previously incarcerated as a prisoner of war for 897 days, inside both Uganda and Tanzania. He was a presidential advisor on Buganda Kingdom affairs. He was well respected for his fight towards environmental protection.

== Background and education ==
He was born in 1952, in Katakala, Mityana District, to a father who was a hunter and farmer. Kasirye Ggwanga learned both skills and was good at both. He attended Katakala Primary School, Namukozi then he studied at Kibuli Secondary School for his O-Level education. After finishing Senior 4, he joined the Uganda Army in 1972.

== Career ==
Following boot camp and initial training, he was posted to Arua in the West Nile sub-region, as a map reader, serving in that capacity until 1977. In 1978, he was promoted to the position of artillery officer and the following year, he was promoted to the rank of staff sergeant.

In 1978, the Tanzania People's Defence Force (TPDF) invaded Uganda. In April they captured Kampala and deposed Idi Amin. Kasirye Ggwanga surrendered and was taken to Tanga, Tanzania, as prisoner of war number 17341.

In June 1980, President Godfrey Binaisa negotiated the return of the political prisoners to Uganda. They were first housed at Maluku Prison in Mbale District. Later, they were moved to Kirinya Prison, Jinja District. On 7 October 1981, Kasirye Ggwanga was in the first batch to be released.

Three months after Kasirye Ggwanga's release, the Uganda Freedom Army (UFA) rebels led by Andrew Kayiira attacked the army barracks at Mengo Lubiri in Kampala. The government in power at the time, led by Milton Obote of the Uganda People's Congress (UPC) mistakenly thought that the recently released prisoners (former Idi Amin soldiers) were involved in the attack. Kasirye Ggwanga was placed on the "wanted list". He went underground.

His elder brother, Lieutenant James Kasirye, a military pilot then based at Nakasongola Military Air Base was arrested and tortured, then killed when he refused to identify where his brother Kasirye Ggwanga was hiding.

To avenge the killing of his brother, Kasirye Ggwanga joined the UFA rebels, then about 650 in number. This group operated in the Mawokota and Mubende areas in Buganda. In 1985, he left UFA and joined Yoweri Museveni's National Resistance Army, which seized power in January 1986. During the drive to capture Kampala, Kasirye Ggwanga commanded a 120mm artillery unit.

Between 1986 and 2005, he served in several roles including as the LC5 chairman for Mubende District and as the director of stores in the UPDF. On 31 January 2005, he was retired from the UPDF at the rank of Brigadier. However, after three months on the outside he came back to the military and asked to be re-instated. The UPDF commander-in-chief allowed him to rejoin on a renewable contract of five years.

In March 2018, Kasirye Ggwanga was promoted from the rank of Brigadier to that of Major General, in a promotions exercise involving 1,384 men and women of the UPDF. He was also officially retired from the Uganda military, in 2018.

== Personal ==
Kasirye Ggwanga was a married father. He was a commercial farmer and owned two farms; one in Mubende District, and another in Mukono District that measures 200 acres (0.81 km^{2}) which he referred to as his Camp David.

== Ggwanga's battles with the law. ==
Throughout his life, Gen. Kasirye Ggwanga was much hailed rather than feared for his rather barbaric record. On several occasions, he used his gun to settle arguments, with his head high.

According to the daily monitor, in August 2017, the now deceased General bragged about burning a grader he found on his daughter's land in Lubowa, a Kampala suburb. The case was soon forgotten since the police did not do much to investigate further.

Asked about the incident, the General said “I burnt that tractor. Tell them. I am now hunting them. I am a bad hunter. Let them know”.

According to Softpower news, in January 2019, Gen Kasirye Ggwanga swaggered into action against renowned musician and presidential advisor Catherine Kusasira. In his attempt to quell noise pollution, the trigger happy veteran shot Catherine's car tyres leaving it damaged and immobile. Yet again, the General who lived his post war years above the law moved away scot free. In fact, the musician had to apologize to him for almost shooting her over a noise report from his sons.

Much is left to be reported about his cruelty or rather tough love lifestyle. Often, he was praised by the majority disregarding the victims.

== See also ==
- Elly Kayanja
- Ali Kiiza
