= Dance with Valentino =

Dance reality show

- Genre: Reality
- Created by: Valentino Richard Kabenge
- Directed by: Zena Bernacca; Valentino Richard Kabenge
- Music by: Daniel Kaweesa, Essie
- Country of origin: Uganda
- Original language: English
- No. of seasons: 1
- No. of episodes: 16 (list of episodes)

Production
- Executive producers: Valentino Richard Kabenge; Zena Bernacca
- Producer: Aly Allibhai
- Cinematography: Cyril Ducottet
- Camera setup: Alternative Two Camera
- Running time: 30 minutes
- Production company: Talent Africa Group

Original release
- Network: NTV Uganda
- Release: November 15, 2020

Dance with Valentino is a dance reality talk show hosted by Valentino Richard Kabenge, a Ugandan Latin and Ballroom dancer and actor. The show premiered on NTV Uganda on November 15, 2020. Guests have an in-depth interview about an unforgettable memory or event that has taken place in their life. The challenge for the professional dance team is to choreograph that story into a dance. The challenge for the guest is to then perform within that choreographed dance, to find a sense of healing at the end. The show also creates awareness around social issues such as domestic violence, depression, heartbreak, loss and rejection etcetera through these special performances.

== Production and filming ==
Valentino Richard Kabenge initially created the concept of 'Dance With Valentino' in 2016 and since then its form has been evolving. In April 2020, during his media run to promote Winnie Nwagi's 'Jangu' music a video, he appeared on NTV Mwasuze Mutya, hosted by Faridah Nakazibwe. Both were a springboard to conversations with Zena Bernacca, a life-long dancer herself and organisational development consultant, coach and mentor, and together through ValRich Arts, they have brought the ‘Dance With Valentino’ show to life.

Work on the show started as early as May 2020. In August 2020, Talent Africa was contracted by ValRich Arts to come on board as the Production House partner. It is being aired by NTV having launched on November 15, 2020.

The theme song was written by James Asiimwe, produced by Big Nash and performed by singers Daniel Kawesa and Essie.

== Cast ==
Cast
Cast Member	Role	Type
Kabenge Richard Valentino	Host & Choreographer	Main
Easthunks	Dancer & Choreographer	Main
Ajiswag	Dancer	Main
Wanyenze Joldine	Dancer	Main
Kemigisha Rinah	Dancer	Main
Edna Nnamanya	Dancer	Main
Hope Amandu	Dancer	Main
Sarah Kisawuzi	Guest	Guest
Patrick Salvador Idringi	Guest	Guest
Daphine Frankstock	Guest	Guest
DJ Slick Stuart	Guest	Guest
Cindy Sanyu	Guest	Guest
Bruno K	Guest	Guest
Winnie Nwagi	Guest	Guest
Joanita Kawalya	Guest	Guest
