= Eleven Eleven Twelve Foundation =

Nigerian environmental non-profit organisation

- Founded: 2019
- Type: Nonprofit organization; Non-governmental organization; Environmental organization
- Location: Onireke Layout, Eleyele Street, Ibadan, Nigeria
- Key people: Dr. Esther Longe; Tosin Femi-Fowode; Oluwabimpe Wendy Abegunde; Adetunji Lam-Adeshina
- Website: Homepage

Eleven Eleven Twelve Foundation (EETF) is a Nigerian non-profit organisation that is concerned with environmental sustainability. EETF pursues this cause through public advocacy and support for entrepreneurs and small businesses whose innovative, creative and sustainable ideas could help advance the United Nations Sustainable Development Goals.

Eleven Eleven Twelve Foundation was founded in 2019 in Ibadan by Adetunji Lam-Adesina, to support enterprise development in the Environmental and Agricultural sector of Africa.
