= Luisa Neubauer =

German climate activist

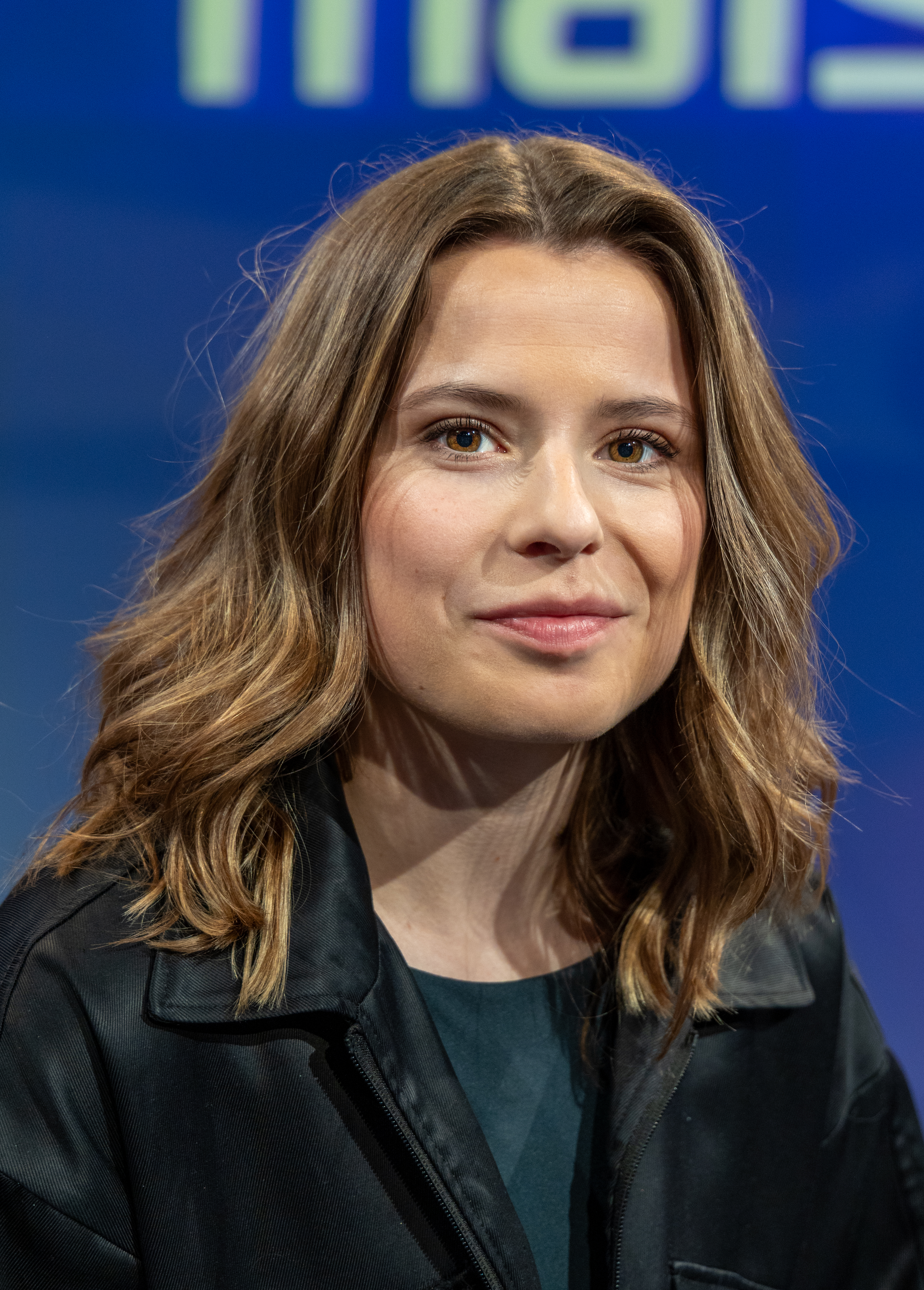
- Neubauer in 2025, age 29
- Born: Luisa-Marie Neubauer; 21 April 1996 (age 30); Hamburg, Germany
- Education: University of Göttingen (B.Sc.)
- Occupation: Climate activist
- Movement: School strike for climate

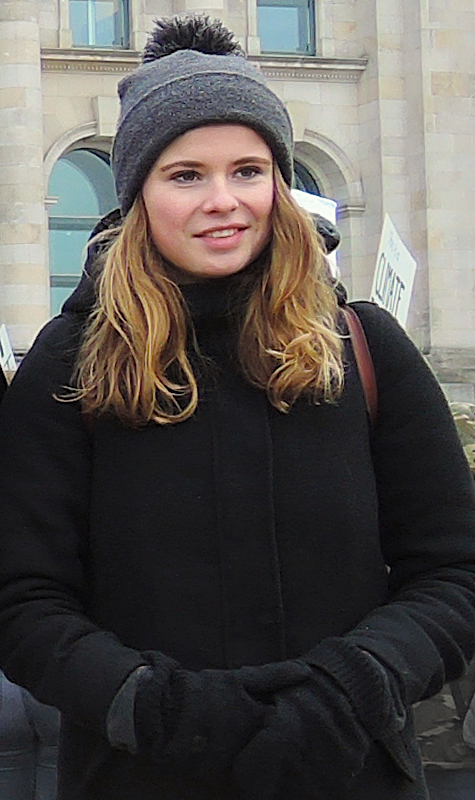
Luisa Neubauer, age 22, leading the first school climate strike in Berlin on 14 December 2018

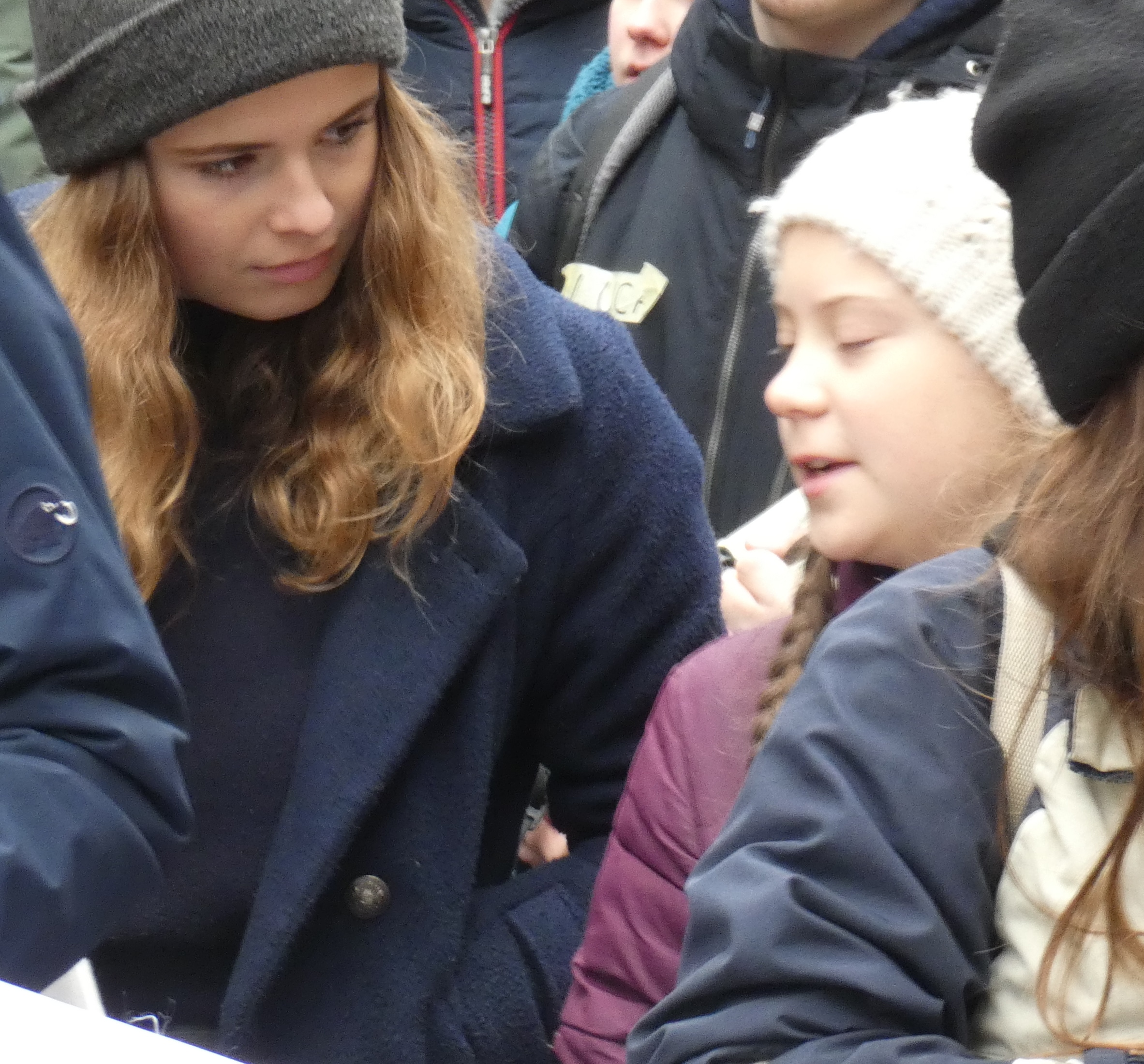
Luisa Neubauer (on the left) with Greta Thunberg (on the right) in March 2019, during a climate protest in Hamburg

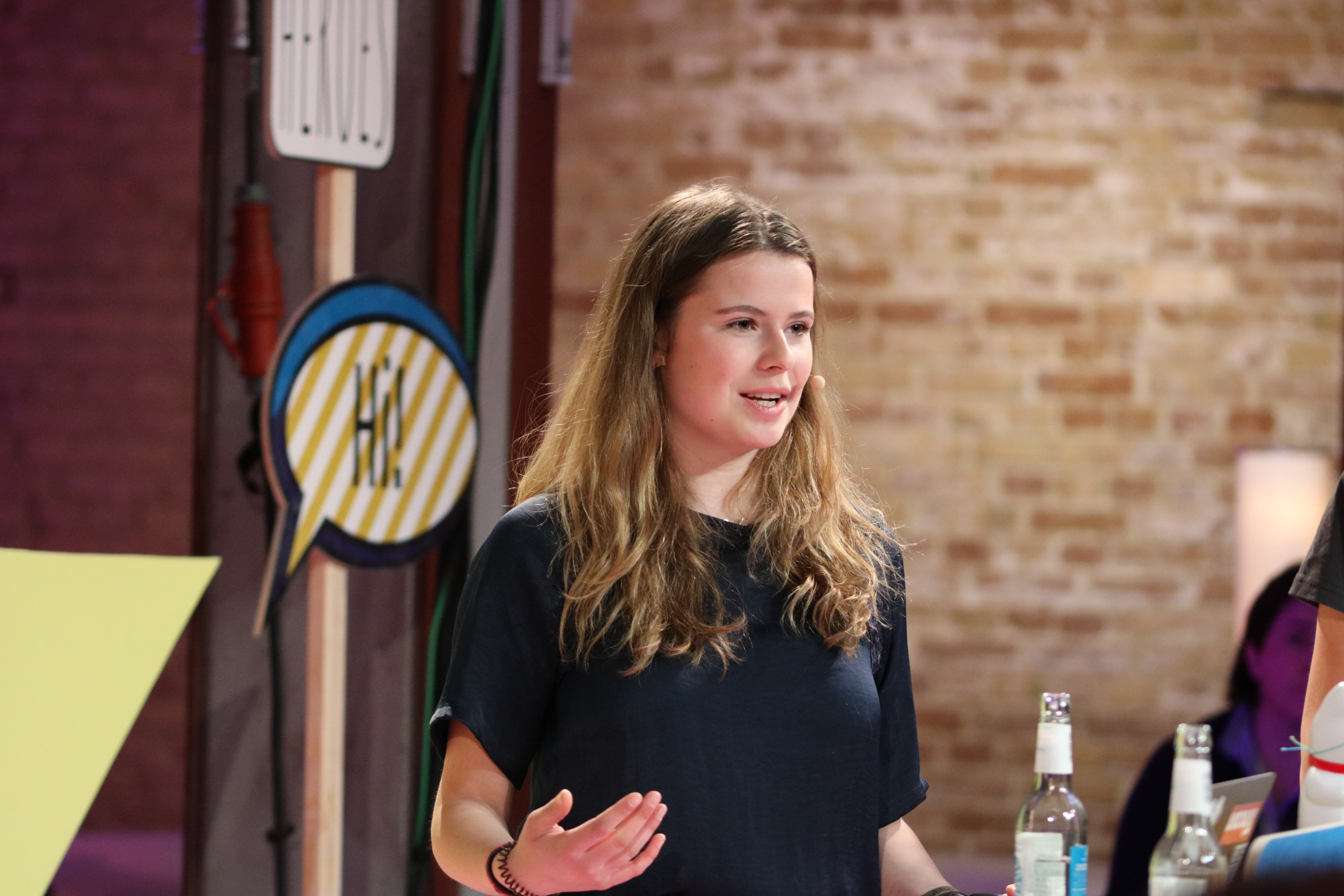
Luisa Neubauer at TINCON re:publica at Kreuzberg, Berlin on 7 May 2019

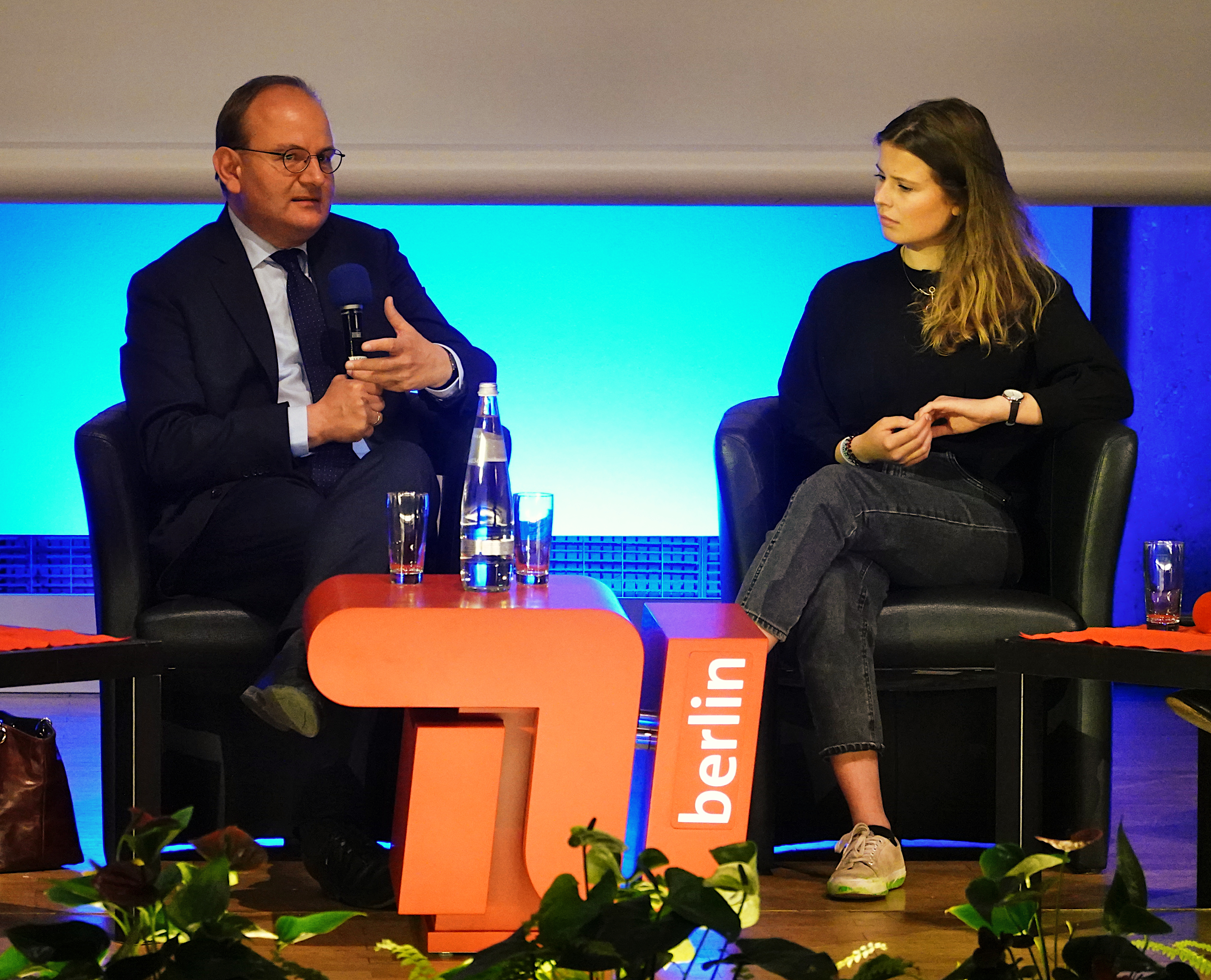
Luisa Neubauer and Ottmar Edenhofer debate climate policy at the Climate Lecture 2019 event at TU Berlin.

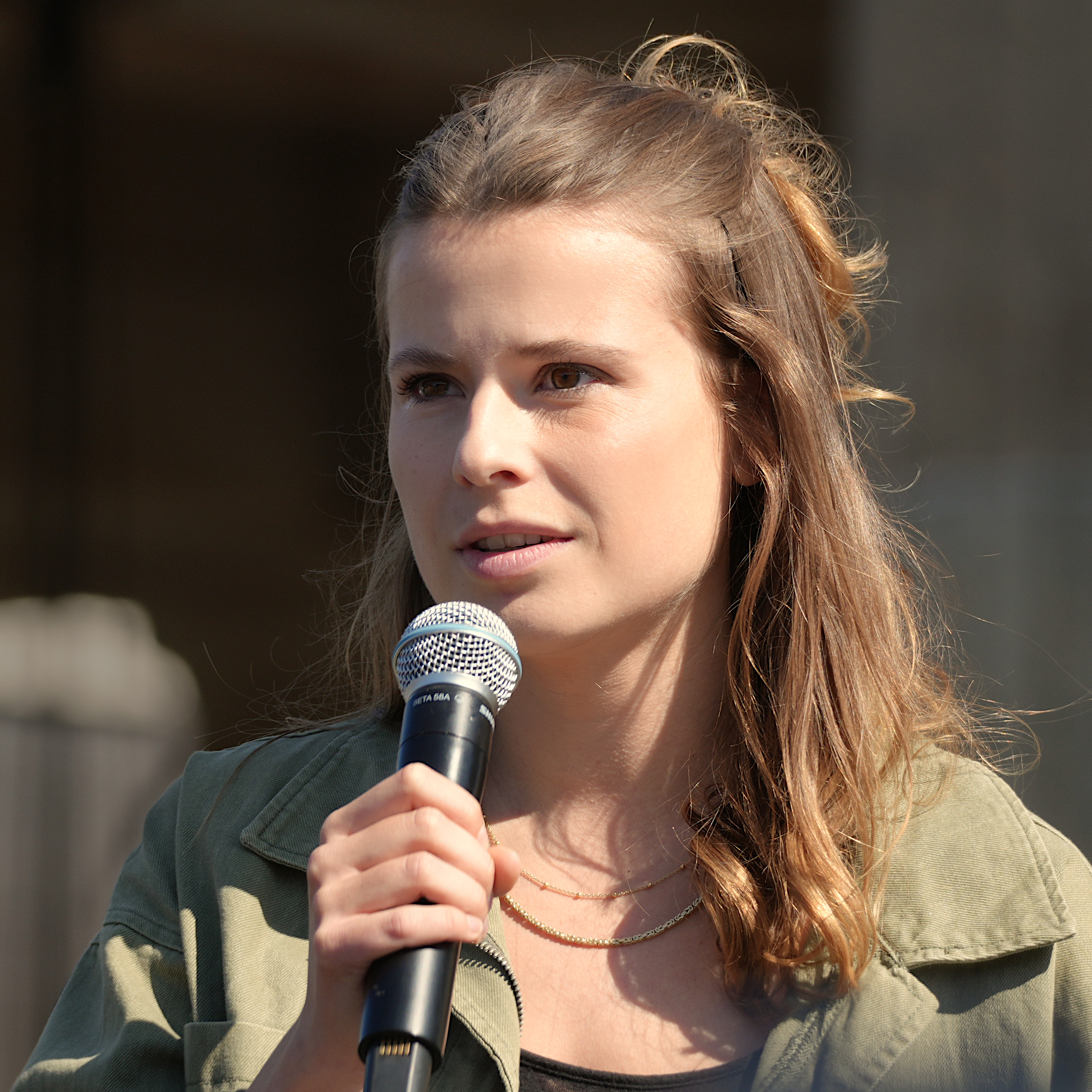
Luisa Neubauer speaking at the Fridays for Future global strike on 15 September 2023 near Brandenburg Gate, Berlin, Germany

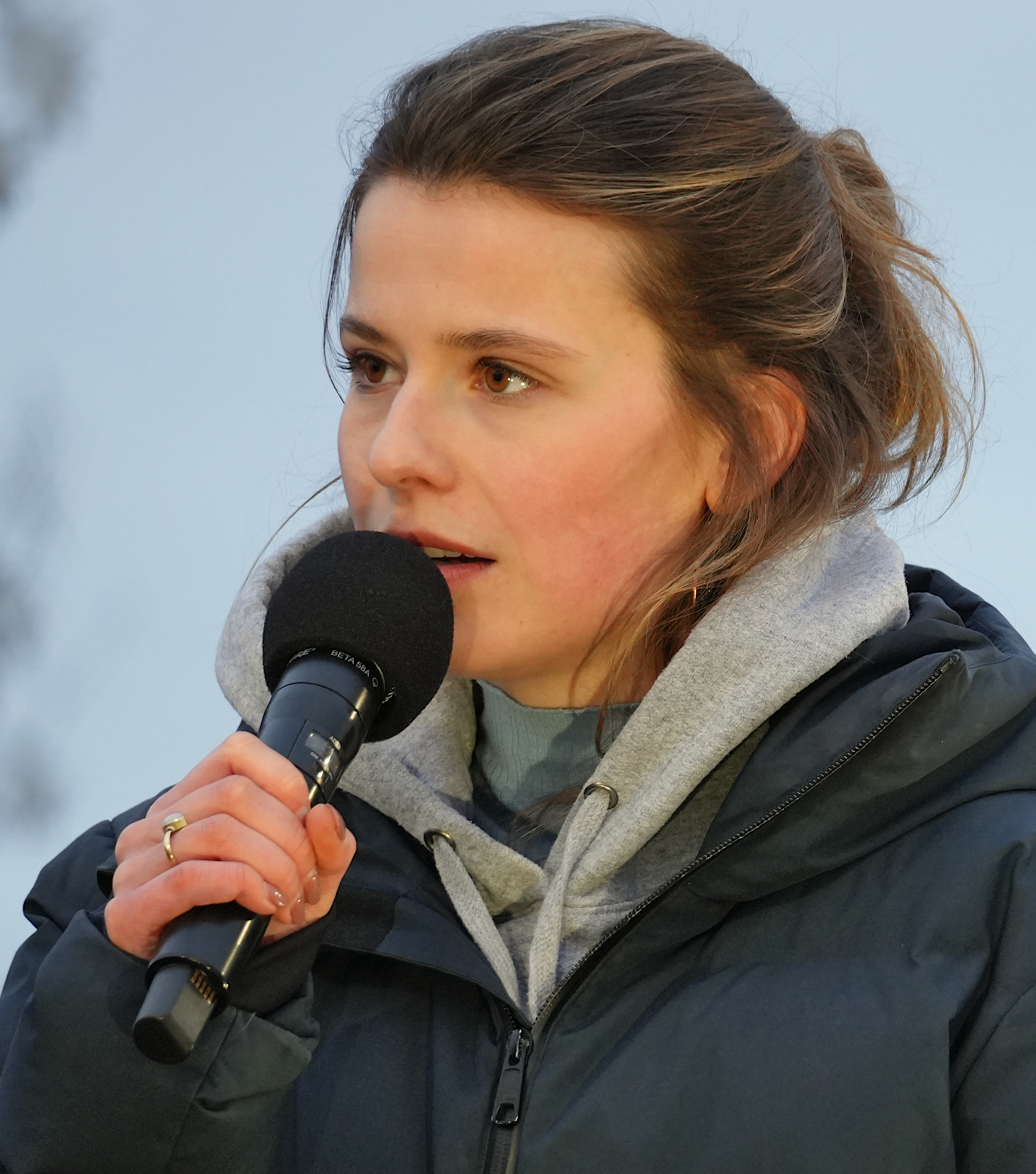
Luisa Neubauer speaks at the Brandmauer demonstration in Berlin in early 2025.

Luisa-Marie Neubauer (born 21 April 1996) is a German climate activist, politician, and author. She is one of the main organizers of the school strike for climate movement in Germany, where it is commonly referred to under its alternative name Fridays for Future. She advocates a climate policy that complies with and surpasses the Paris Agreement and endorses de-growth. Neubauer is a member of Alliance 90/The Greens and the Green Youth.

== Life ==
Neubauer was born in Hamburg as the youngest of four siblings. Her mother is a nurse. Her grandmother Dagmar Reemtsma (born 1933 as Dagmar von Hänisch) got involved in the anti-nuclear movement of the 1980s. She sensitized Luisa Neubauer to the climate problem and gave her her share of the taz cooperative. Two of Neubauer's three older siblings live in London. Her cousin Carla Reemtsma is also a climate activist.

Neubauer grew up in Hamburg's Iserbrook district and completed her high school diploma in 2014 at the Marion-Dönhoff-Gymnasium in the affluent Blankenese neighborhood. In the year after her graduation she worked for a development aid project in Tanzania and on an organic farm in England. In 2015 she started studying geography at the University of Göttingen. She did a semester abroad at the University College London and received scholarships from the German government and the Alliance 90/The-Greens-affiliated Heinrich Böll Foundation. In 2020 she completed her studies with a Bachelor of Science.

Since 2023 she is partnered with Louis Klamroth. Klamroth is a German TV-moderator, actor and media businessman. He is presenter of "Hart aber Fair" in ARD TV.

=== Early activism ===
Neubauer has been a youth ambassador of the non-governmental organization ONE since 2016. She was also active for the Foundation for the Rights of Future Generations, 350.org, the Right Livelihood Award foundation, the Fossil Free campaign and The Hunger Project. With the campaign Divest! Withdraw your money! she forced the University of Göttingen to stop investing in industries that make money with coal, oil or gas.

== Fridays for Future ==
Luisa Neubauer was an organizer and spokesperson for the first school climate strike on 14 December 2018, which also made use of the social media hashtag #FridaysForFuture. Schoolchildren in fourteen German cities (and also in Australia and Sweden) contributed for three hours. In a detailed interview with WikiTribune, Neubauer explained:

The German coal exit "is a must do, it is not a question, it's not even a question of time, because we know we have to quit coal now" and added that the exit "needs to be fair and just, no one ever questioned that our transition must be just".

In early‑2019, Neubauer became known as one of the leading Fridays For Future activists. Many media outlets refer to her as the "German face of the movement". Neubauer rejects comparisons of herself and other strike organizers to Greta Thunberg, saying: "We're building a mass-movement and reaching out quite far in our methods of mobilizing and gaining attention. What Greta does is incredibly inspiring but actually relatively far from that."

Neubauer does not see the strikes as a means of directly affecting politics. More important is the work behind the strikes: "What we're doing is incredibly sustainable. We're creating structures and turning the events into educational experiences. And we're leading debates on the principles of climate protection."

Following the protests of Fridays For Future Germany against Siemens for a specific infrastructure project in Australia, Neubauer met with Joe Kaeser in January 2020. On 13 January 2020 she announced that she had turned down an offer for a seat on the Siemens Energy's supervisory board: "If I were to take it up, I would be obliged to represent the company's interests and could never be an independent critic of Siemens," Neubauer explained. "That is not compatible with my role as [a] climate activist.". Joe Kaeser stated that he did not offer Neubauer a seat in the companies' Board, but that he is open to have Neubauer on a Board on environmental questions

On the day before Siemens announced that they will keep the contract with Adani to provide the rail infrastructure of the Carmichael coal mine in Australia. Neubauer told the news agency DPA: "We asked Kaeser to do everything possible to stop the Adani mine. Instead he will now profit from this disastrous project." She added that this decision was "so last century" and that Kaeser was making an "unforgivable mistake".

In September 2025 Neubauer was awarded the Albert-Schweitzer-Medal 2025 in Berlin. The laudation, held by the 2022 Medal winner Heinrich Bedford-Strohm, praised her for her relentless commitment against climate change with "Fridays for Future" and her journalistic work for a "humane, sustainable and fairer future".

=== Gaza war ===
Following the start of Gaza war on 7 October 2023, Neubauer has been dealing with conflicting positions within both Fridays for Future Germany and the wider climate movement. In an interview with Der Spiegel, Neubauer indicated her expectations for the COP 28 climate meeting in these terms:

It will be really complicated. There are intensive efforts on the part of international organizations to place Palestinian suffering at the center of the debates at the climate conference. In this case, we will work to ensure that Jewish suffering and the terror of Hamas are also mentioned. Of course, we will also work with human rights organizations to stand up for political prisoners, as we did [at COP 27].

Der Spiegel wrote elsewhere:

The climate movement is now facing a potential schism. The German chapter of Fridays for Future has distanced itself from the international movement, with Luisa Neubauer, the group's most prominent member in the country, telling Der Spiegel in an interview that "the loss of trust is immense".

Neubauer had earlier separated herself from public statements by the Fridays for Future international board regarding the military action by Israel. The board had openly supported Palestinian nationalism and described the bombardment of the Gaza Strip by Israeli forces as "a genocide". Speaking on behalf on Fridays for Future Germany, Neubauer told the Deutsche Presse-Agentur that FFF Germany "firmly condemned Hamas terrorism" and stated that the social media managers of FFF's international channels had "improperly used [those] platforms to share disinformation and antisemitism".

== Position and appearances ==
=== Relationship to politics ===
Although Neubauer is a member of Alliance 90/The Greens and the Green Youth, she says she does not actively pursue party work. At the Alliance 90/The Greens policy convention on 29 March 2019, Neubauer gave a speech that was received with much applause. She called for an emissions budget for Germany. "If even the Greens can't do that, then I don't know why we're even taking to the streets", Neubauer said.

Neubauer assessed the 2019 European elections as a key event to motivate the European youth to protect climate. According to her, the Grand Coalition failed after the climate strikes began. They were postponing the adoption of a climate protection law and were celebrating a coal phase-out that is ten years too late for the climate.

At the EU summit in Sibiu in May 2019, Neubauer joined other climate activists in meeting Emmanuel Macron and eight other EU leaders.

In an interview with Tagesthemen (one of Germany's main daily television news magazines) on 20 August 2020, after a meeting with other activists and German Chancellor Angela Merkel, Luisa Neubauer expressed skepticism about the German government's activities to achieve the climate target of 1.5 degrees global warming. "Who, if not Germany, could lead the way here?" She also expressed irritation about the commissioning of new coal-fired power plants.

During a Spiegel interview with member of German parliament Wolfgang Schäuble at the end of October 2020, Neubauer emphasized the special status of the climate crisis as a problem that affects all areas of life. A stable democracy and a good economy require a stable planet. Ultimately, he said, it was "about us humans" for whom the climate crisis would eventually become unbearable. Measured by the Paris climate goals and scientific findings, action is clearly too slow. The price for this is an escalating climate crisis. "And nothing will rob us of more freedom than this crisis. The slower we are, the greater the destruction, the greater the restriction of freedom in the end."

In a double interview in September 2021 with Der Tagesspiegel (a German daily newspaper), which interviewed her along with Greta Thunberg, Neubauer criticized the media and politicians for downplaying or ignoring the climate crisis for decades. Chancellor Angela Merkel never once "went out on a limb" for climate change, never took a serious risk "to move the country noticeably toward climate-friendly democracy". As a result, it remains unclear how the public would respond on the question of how just a form of climate protection is, in which there is no real social compensation for rising costs for housing heating and fuel for internal combustion cars due to increased CO_{2} prices, Neubauer said that Fridays for Future is a movement for climate justice. It also demands socially just climate protection. She said it's important to be vigilant in this debate: "We experience political voices that never supported climate action now using social inequality as an excuse to do nothing."

Neubauer, writing in Der Spiegel in December 2024, argues that the political backsliding on climate protection in Germany over the past two years or so is the responsibility of everyone. She advocates an urgent deployment of the decarbonization solutions we have at hand. And she says she is repeatedly asked these days whether it is too late to act — to which she replies: "Now is not the time for self‑pity."

In January 2025, Neubauer told The Guardian newspaper that "like many, I did buy into the idea that big catastrophes would do something to politics" and also believed that "there was a democratic responsibility that would live through coalition [government] changes and climate changes". Neubauer indicated the biggest failure of Fridays for Future Germany was not to embed climate policy across the political spectrum "in a way that it could sustainably live on without us". Neubauer also argued that "it is no longer green technologies that are the issue, but the fight for democracy and truth" and furthermore that "if there's no shared reality in which we operate, it will be impossible to move forward with the climate transition".

At the opening of the 2025 Berlinale, Neubauer wore a long formal dress with slogans suggesting that CDU/CSU chancellor candidate Friedrich Merz was normalizing far‑right politics. Neubauer's conduct drew strong criticism from Ralf Schumacher.

=== Criticism ===
Neubauer received negative press coverage for her past flights to countries all around the world. She responded that any criticism of her personal consumption distracts from larger structural and political issues. She said further, this kind of criticism expressed a generational conflict and a question of power that pits private ecological behavior against larger political issues, such as rising CO_{2} levels and the general amount of air travel. She herself confessed to eating largely vegan, flying less often than before, and compensating for her flights.

Alexander Straßner [de], an adjunct professor of political science at Regensburg University, accused her of using the term "old white man" as a synonym for someone with different opinions to discredit such people.

In 2024 when journalist Jan Fleischhauer commented on conducting interviews with Neubauer, he described her mixture of "upper-class daughter", "know-it-all attitude", and "cosmo-mumbo-jumbo" as "unique" and "uniquely insufferable".

== Published works ==
- 2022: Gegen die Ohnmacht. Meine Großmutter, die Politik und ich
- 2025: Was wäre, wenn wir mutig sind? Book.
