= Elections in Uganda =

The Uganda Electoral Commission (EC) provides national elections for a president and a legislature. The president is elected for a five-year term. The Parliament is composed of members directly elected to represent constituencies, and one woman representative for every district; as well representatives of special interest groups, including the army, youth, workers and persons with disabilities.

== Overview ==
The first national election in Uganda was the Uganda National Assembly election of 1962. An alliance between the Uganda People's Congress (UPC) and Kabaka Yekka (KY) won the majority of parliamentary seats, and formed Uganda's first post-independence government with Obote as executive Prime Minister.

A period of dictatorship and political strife, including the tenures of Idi Amin, Yusuf Lule and Godfrey Binaisa, meant no elections were held until the presidential election of December 1980. Obote was pronounced the winner amid bitter dispute and allegations of electoral fraud. Yoweri Museveni, one of the presidential aspirants, declared an armed rebellion, and waged a guerrilla war (the Ugandan Bush War) against the government of Obote. Museveni's National Resistance Army (NRA) took power in 1986 from the government of Gen. Tito Okello Lutwa who had six months earlier toppled Obote's UPC government in a July 27, 1985 military coup, making him president.

Museveni and his National Resistance Movement (NRM) created a form of "no-party democracy", banning political parties from fielding candidates directly in elections. In the "no-party" presidential election in 1996, Museveni defeated Paul Ssemogerere and Mohamed Mayanja by a landslide. Although international and domestic observers described the vote as valid, both the losing candidates rejected the results. In the following presidential election, held in 2001, Museveni won by a substantial majority, with Kizza Besigye as the only real challenger. Despite a protest against the results, citing massive voter intimidation and rigging, the outcome was accepted by the Supreme Court of Uganda.

In the 2005 constitutional referendum, Ugandans voted to restore a multi-party political system, lifting the 19-year restriction on the activities of political parties. The 2006 general election was the first multiparty election in 25 years. Museveni won 59% of the presidential vote, and his party, the National Resistance Movement, won the majority of parliamentary seats. Pop star and opposition leader with Bobi Wine challenged Museveni for the presidency in the 2021 election, with Museveni winning.

== Latest elections ==
=== President ===
Candidate	Party	Votes	%
Yoweri Museveni	National Resistance Movement	7,946,772	71.65
Bobi Wine	National Unity Platform	2,741,238	24.72
Nandala Mafabi	Forum for Democratic Change	209,039	1.88
Mugisha Muntu	Alliance for National Transformation	59,276	0.53
Frank Bulira Kabinga	Revolutionary Peoples Party	45,959	0.41
Robert Kasibante	National Peasants Party	33,440	0.30
Munyagwa Mubarak Sserunga	Common Man's Party	31,666	0.29
Elton Joseph Mabirizi	Conservative Party	23,458	0.21
Total		11,090,848	100.00
Valid votes		11,090,848	97.58
Invalid/blank votes		275,353	2.42
Total votes		11,366,201	100.00
Registered voters/turnout		21,649,067	52.50
Source: Daily Monitor

=== Parliament ===
Party	Constituency			Women			Special Interests Groups			Total seats	+/–
Party	Votes	%	Seats	Votes	%	Seats	Votes	%	Seats	Total seats	+/–
National Resistance Movement	5,000,564	47.98	249	5,015,892	49.84	109	7,740	44.13	14	372	+36
National Unity Platform	1,349,645	12.95	39	1,550,819	15.41	10	31	0.18	0	49	–8
Uganda People's Congress	250,864	2.41	8	301,721	3.00	4	343	1.96	0	12	+3
Forum for Democratic Change	245,988	2.36	6	255,848	2.54	3	21	0.12	0	9	–23
People's Front for Freedom	131,055	1.26	0	70,832	0.70	2				2	New
Democratic Party	106,583	1.02	6	18,216	0.18	0	11	0.06	0	6	–3
Democratic Front	64,501	0.62	0	39,220	0.39	0				0	New
Alliance for National Transformation	37,197	0.36	1	1,434	0.01	0	1	0.01	0	1	+1
People's Progressive Party	14,482	0.14	0							0	–1
Justice Forum	13,048	0.13	0	3,374	0.03	0	3	0.02	0	0	–1
Uganda Patriotic Movement	5,769	0.06	0							0	New
National Peasants' Party	4,357	0.04	0							0	New
Common Man's Party	2,178	0.02	0	2,242	0.02	0				0	New
Ecological Party of Uganda	1,874	0.02	0							0	0
Conservative Party	595	0.01	0							0	0
National Economic Empowerment Dialogue	504	0.00	0	1,720	0.02	0				0	New
Society for Peace and Development	186	0.00	0							0	New
Congress Service Volunteers Organisation				155	0.00	0				0	0
Uganda People's Defence Force							4,541	25.89	10	10	0
Independent	3,192,557	30.63	44	2,803,502	27.85	18	4,849	27.65	6	68	–6
Total	10,421,947	100.00	353	10,064,975	100.00	146	17,540	100.00	30	529	0
Source: Electoral Commission

== Next ==
- 2031 Ugandan general election

== See also ==
- Electoral calendar
- Electoral system
- Internet censorship and surveillance in Uganda
