= President of Uganda =

Head of state and government

President of the Republic of Uganda
- Presidential Standard

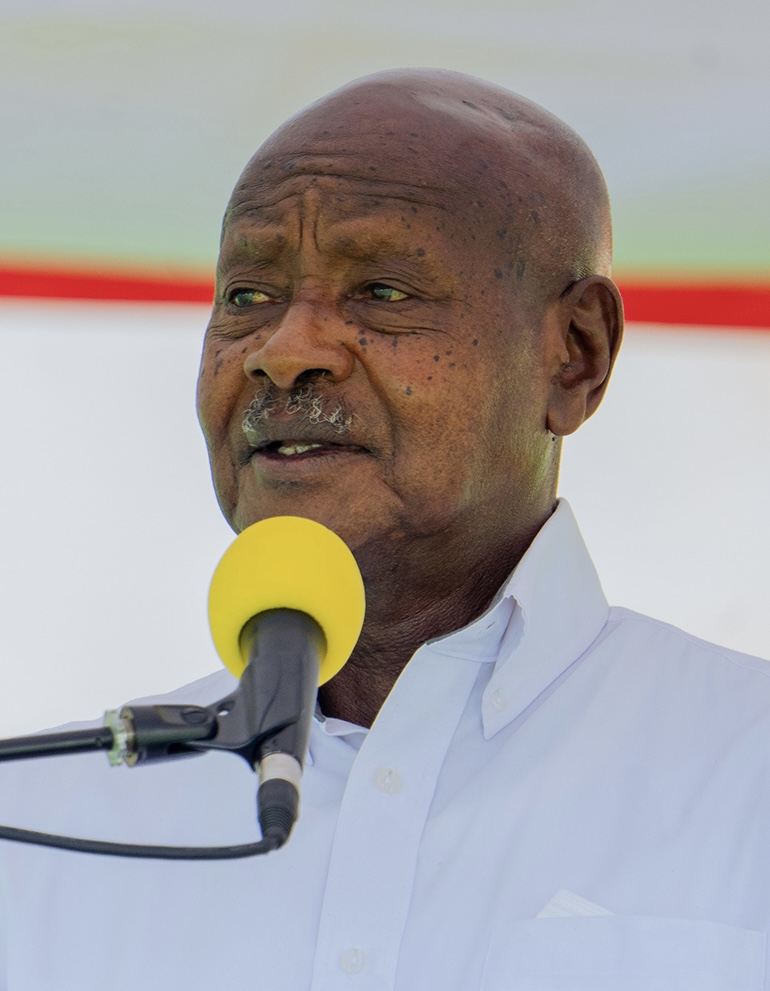
- Incumbent; Yoweri Museveni since 29 January 1986
- Style: His Excellency; Your Excellency
- Type: Head of state Head of government Commander-in-chief
- Residence: State House, Entebbe
- Term length: Five years, no term limits
- Constituting instrument: Constitution of Uganda (1995)
- Precursor: Queen of Uganda
- Formation: 9 October 1963; 62 years ago
- First holder: Kabaka Sir Edward Muteesa
- Deputy: Vice President
- Salary: USh 33,600,000 / US$9,130 annually
- Website: statehouse.go.ug

The president of the Republic of Uganda is the head of state and the head of government of Uganda. The president leads the executive branch of the government of Uganda and is the commander-in-chief of the Uganda People's Defence Force.

== Background ==
The office of the president of Uganda was formed on 9th October 1963 to replace the queen of Uganda (which was last held by Elizabeth II) as head of state. It was entirely a ceremonial role i.e without executive powers during the time of the first holder Mutesa II of Buganda until the end of the Mengo Crisis in 1967 when Milton Obote took over ending the alliance between the Uganda People's Congress and the Kabaka Yekka parties combining the roles of prime minister and president and therefore creating the first president of Uganda with executive powers. The office has been held by 9 people, 8 of whom (besides Edward Muteesa) came into power through military coups and civil war.

The incumbent Yoweri Museveni came to power in 1986 and is the longest serving president of Uganda, ahead of Idi Amin who ruled from 1971 to 1979.

== Qualifications ==
In 2005 presidential term limits were removed, and in 2017, the previous upper age limit of 75 was also removed.

Under Article 102 of the Constitution, in order to be allowed to run for the presidency one must be a citizen of Uganda by birth, be no younger than thirty-five and eligible to be a member of Parliament.

== State House ==
State House is the official residence of the president of Uganda. The main State House was constructed in 1925 during the governorship of Sir Geoffrey Archer at Entebbe the then capital to serve as the official viceregal residence (Government House) of the Governor of Uganda. After the country gained independence in 1962, the residence continued to be the official residence of the president of the Republic of Uganda. However, it was first inhabited by Sir William Frederick Gowers, while the second State House is at Nakasero.

== Latest election ==
Candidate	Party	Votes	%
Yoweri Museveni	National Resistance Movement	7,946,772	71.65
Bobi Wine	National Unity Platform	2,741,238	24.72
Nandala Mafabi	Forum for Democratic Change	209,039	1.88
Mugisha Muntu	Alliance for National Transformation	59,276	0.53
Frank Bulira Kabinga	Revolutionary People's Party	45,959	0.41
Robert Kasibante	National Peasants Party	33,440	0.30
Munyagwa Mubarak Sserunga	Common Man's Party	31,666	0.29
Elton Joseph Mabirizi	Conservative Party	23,458	0.21
Total		11,090,848	100.00
Valid votes		11,090,848	97.58
Invalid/blank votes		275,353	2.42
Total votes		11,366,201	100.00
Registered voters/turnout		21,649,067	52.50
Source: Daily Monitor

== See also ==
- List of heads of state of Uganda
- Vice President of Uganda
- Prime Minister of Uganda
- Politics of Uganda
- History of Uganda
- List of political parties in Uganda
