= List of political parties in Uganda =

This article lists political parties in Uganda. Until a constitutional referendum in July 2005, only one political organization, the Movement (also called the National Resistance Movement) was allowed to operate in Uganda. The president, who also chairs the Movement, maintained that the Movement was not a political party, but a mass organization that claimed the loyalty of all Ugandans.

Until the 2005 referendum, the 1995 constitution had required the suspension of political parties while the Movement organization was in governance. Other political parties could technically exist but were prohibited from sponsoring candidates and holding meetings.

Registered political parties are now allowed to operate openly and contest elections. However, sometimes they find hardship in practicing their rights by the party in power.

== Active political parties ==
=== Parties with parliamentary representation ===
Party	Abbr.	Leader	Political position	Ideology	MPs
National Resistance Movement; Harakati za Upinzani za Kitaifa	NRM	Yoweri Museveni	Far-right	Ugandan nationalism; Neoliberalism; National conservatism; Right-wing populism; Anti-LGBT	372 / 529
National Unity Platform; Jukwaa la Umoja wa Kitaifa	NUP	Robert Kyagulanyi Ssentamu	Centre-left	Progressivism; Social democracy; Social liberalism	49 / 529
Uganda People's Congress; Congress ya Watu wa Uganda	UPC	Jimmy Micheal Akena	Centre-left (with left-wing factions)	Social democracy; African nationalism; Pan-Africanism	12 / 529
Forum for Democratic Change; Jukwaa la Mabadiliko ya Kidemokrasia	FDC	Patrick Amuriat Oboi	Centre-right	Liberal democracy; Liberal conservatism; Secularism	9 / 529
Democratic Party; Chama cha Kidemokrasia	DP	Norbert Mao	Centre-right	Christian democracy Social conservatism	6 / 529
Alliance for National Transformation	ANT	Mugisha Muntu	Centre-left	Social democracy	1 / 529

=== Political Parties without Representation in Parliament ===
As of September 2023, the Uganda Electoral Commission lists 26 registered political parties on its website. Some of the listed parties include the following:

- Activist Party
- Sammy unity Platform
- Congress Service Volunteers Organisation
- Conservative Party
- Ecological Party of Uganda
- Forum for Integrity in Leadership
- Green Partisan Party
- Justice Forum
- Liberal Democratic Transparency Party
- National Convention For Democracy
- National Peasants’ Party
- People's Development Party
- People's Progressive Party
- People’s United Movement
- Republican Women and Youth Party
- Revolutionary People’s Party
- Social Democratic Party
- Society for Peace and Development
- Uganda Economic Party
- Uganda Federal Alliance
- Uganda Patriotic Movement

== Defunct political parties ==
- Kabaka Yekka
- Uganda People's Movement

== See also ==
- List of leaders of Uganda
- List of political parties by country
- Uganda Salvation Front
