= 2016 Ugandan general election =

- 18 February 2016
- Registered: 15,277,198
- Presidential election
- Turnout: 67.61% (▲8.32 pp)
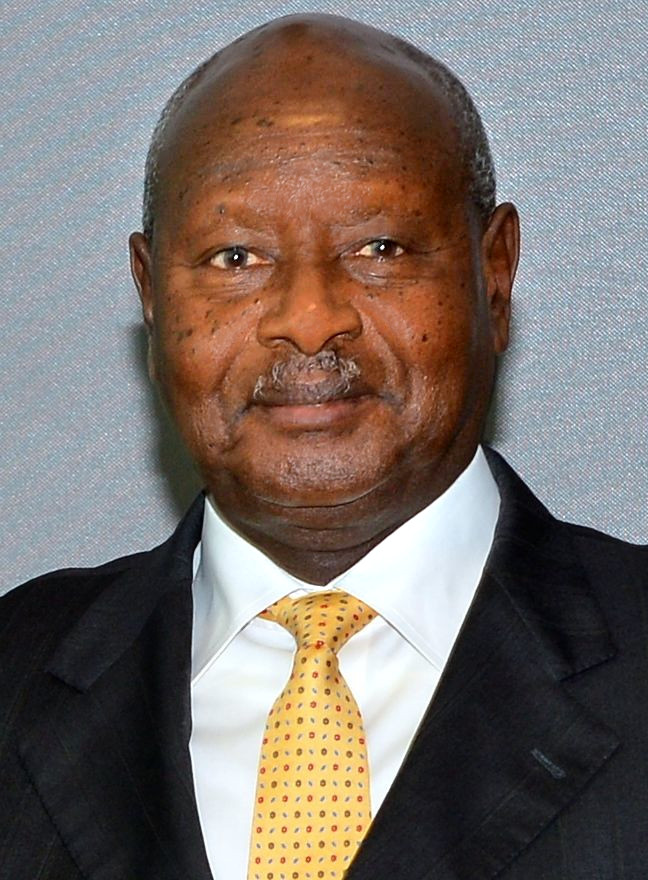

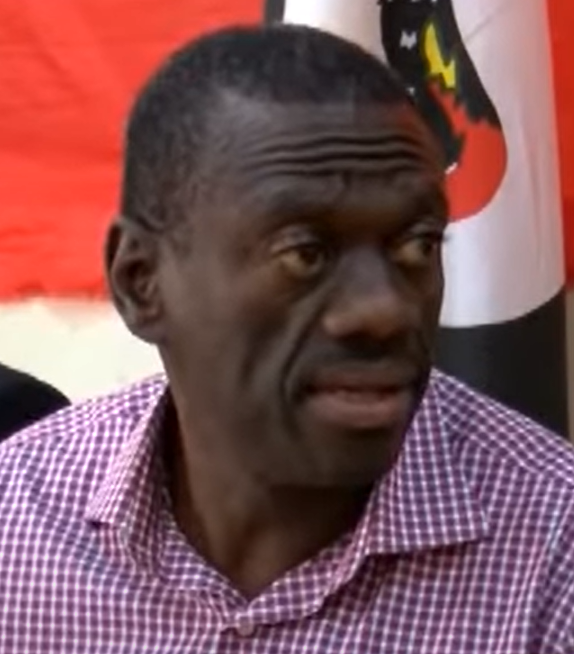
| Nominee | Yoweri Museveni | Kizza Besigye |
| Party | NRM | FDC |
| Popular vote | 5,971,872 | 3,508,687 |
| Percentage | 60.62% | 35.61% |
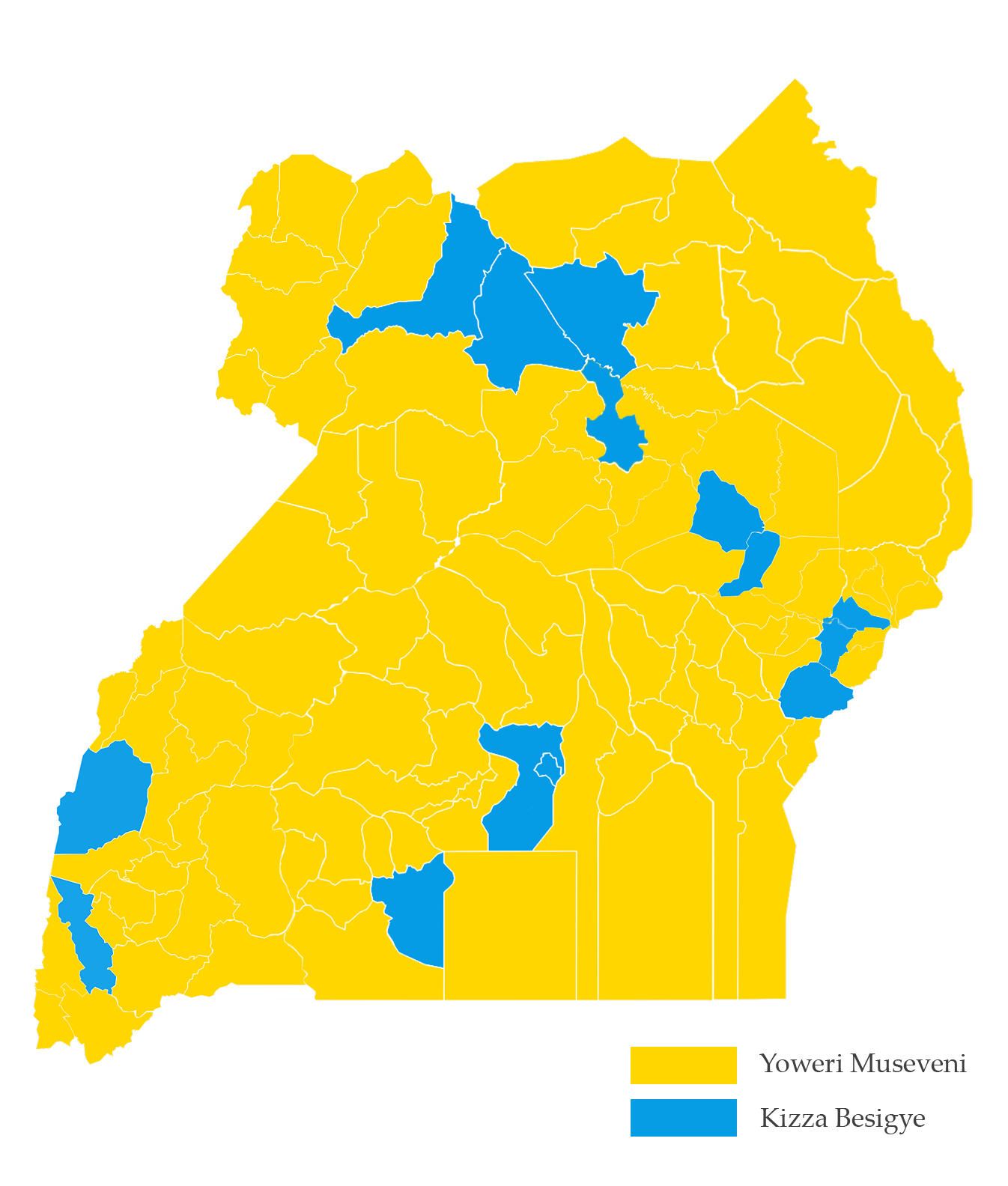
- Presidential election results map. Yellow denotes provinces won by Museveni, and Blue denotes those won by Besigye.
President before election
Yoweri Museveni
NRM
Elected President
Yoweri Museveni
NRM
- Parliamentary election
- 416 of the 426 seats in Parliament; 209 seats needed for a majority
| Party | Leader | Vote % | Seats | +/– |
|---|---|---|---|---|
| NRM | Yoweri Museveni | 48.88 | 293 | +30 |
| FDC | Kizza Besigye | 12.73 | 36 | +2 |
| DP | Norbert Mao | 4.34 | 15 | +3 |
| UPC | Olara Otunnu | 2.14 | 6 | −4 |
| Independents | – | 31.16 | 66 | +23 |
This lists parties that won seats. See the complete results below.
| Speaker of Parliament before | Speaker of Parliament after |
|---|---|
| Rebecca Kadaga; NRM | Rebecca Kadaga; NRM |

General elections were held in Uganda on 18 February 2016 to elect the President and Parliament. Polling day was declared a national holiday.

Presidential candidates included incumbent Yoweri Museveni, in power since 1986, Kizza Besigye, who had run against Museveni in 2001, 2006 and 2011, former Prime Minister Amama Mbabazi, Abed Bwanika who has also challenged Museveni in 2001, 2006 and 2011, former Makerere University Vice Chancellor Venansius Baryamureeba, retired Army General Benon Biraaro, Joseph Mabirizi and former presidential advisor Faith Kyalya. Claims of rigging and violence at polling stations were reported and voting was extended in several locations after reports of people not being allowed to cast their votes. According to the Electoral Commission, Museveni was re-elected with 61% of the vote to Besigye's 35%.

Opposition candidates claimed that the elections were marred by widespread fraud, voting irregularities, the repeated arrest of opposition politicians and a climate of voter intimidation. The European Union and United States have since criticised the election for lack of transparency and detentions of opposition candidates. Overseers from the Commonwealth of Nations were critical of the misuse of state powers in favour of the incumbent.

== Electoral system ==
The President of Uganda was elected using the two-round system, with candidates needing to receive at least 50% of the vote to be elected in the first round. Chapter 142 of the Presidential Elections Act of 2000 of Uganda stipulates that presidential candidates must be a citizen of Uganda by birth, between 35 and 75 years old and be qualified to be an MP. Candidates were also required to be of sound mind and have no formal connection with the Electoral Commission of Uganda. Term limits were abolished in 2005.

Members of the Parliament of Uganda were elected in single-member constituencies using first-past-the-post voting. In addition, a number of seats were reserved for female candidates. The Parliament elected in 2011 had 375 seats, but voted to increase the number of constituencies to 418 for the 2016 elections.

The elections were supervised by the Electoral Commission of Uganda, which registered 15,277,198 voters.

== Presidential candidates ==
Eight candidates contested the presidential elections. Four candidates were from a generation called the Bush War revolutionaries, and were part of the guerrilla armies that toppled the previous government in 1986. Yoweri Museveni was running for his seventh term in office in 2016. He took power in 1986 after winning a guerrilla war against President Tito Okello. Museveni has been president for 30 years in a country where 78% of the population was under the age of 30 at the time of the elections. Museveni's main rival was four-time rival Kizza Besigye, who ran under the Forum for Democratic Change ticket and has lost the past three elections against Museveni. Besigye was Museveni's personal physician and a military officer who broke ties with the NRM government in 2001.

Amama Mbabazi, a former Prime minister of Uganda and a founding member of the NRM, ran against the incumbent president under the Go Forward ticket. Mbabazi was sacked as prime minister in 2014 in a power struggle with Museveni. The Go Forward party was part of the Democratic Alliance, an alliance between Mbabazi, the Democratic Party, Uganda Peoples Congress and the Justice Forum (JEEMA). The alliance initially also included the FDC; however, due to disagreements in electing the alliance candidate for the election, the FDC split from the alliance.

Abed Bwanika, a veterinarian, also ran for a third time. The doctor ran under the People's Development Party (PDP) banner. Though it was Bwanika's third time running for the presidency, he had failed to rally much support for his previous campaigns.

== Campaign ==
=== First presidential debate ===
Uganda held its first ever televised presidential debate on 15 January 2016. The debate took place at the Serena Hotel in Kampala and was led by BBC Newsday presenter Alan Kasujja and KTN journalist Nancy Kacungira. The presidential debate was attended by all presidential aspirants, except the incumbent president Yoweri Museveni, who was not present. Topics such as Uganda's growing national debt, corruption, education and job creation were at the centre of all candidates' manifestos.

=== Second presidential debate ===
The second presidential debate was held on 13 February 2016 at the Serena hotel. Unlike the first debate, the debate was attended by President Museveni. All eight candidates appeared at the debate, although Joseph Mabirizi arrived at the debate late. The debate was moderated by Dr. Shaka Ssali, who is a host of VOA's Straight Talk Africa, Dr. Joel Serunkuma Kibazo, the director of communications and external relations at the African Development Bank, and Dr. Suzie Muwanga, the head of political science and public administration at Makerere University. Foreign policy, national security and the economy were at the centre of the debate topics.

== Opinion polls ==
| Pollster | Date | Sample size | Yoweri Museveni NRM | Kizza Besigye FDC | Amama Mbabazi Go Fwd. | Others | Undecided |
|---|---|---|---|---|---|---|---|
| Research World International | 5–8 December 2015 | ~2000 | 59.9% | 21% | 1.9% | 1.3% | 16.1% |
| Research World International | 19 December 2015–10 January 2016 | ~2000 | 51% | 32% | 12% | 5% | |
| Ipsos Uganda | 1–8 February 2016 | ~2000 | 53% | 28% | – | – | – |

== Conduct ==
Uganda has not seen a single peaceful transition of power in the country since its independence. Many observers believed that post-election demonstrations will occur and many protests will be under the risk of state sanctioned violence.

- The government recruited hundreds of thousands of unemployed young men. They have been hired, ostensibly, to prevent crime; however, according to Human Rights Watch, they have harassed opposition politicians and supporters.
- 1 February 2016 – The arrival of ballot papers from South Africa was delayed by about 3 hours and some theorists suggested that the authorities were conducting foul play to favor a certain candidate. Conspiracy theorists believe that the Ethiopian Airlines aircraft made an unscheduled stop in Kigali where some ballots were dropped off to be later transported into Uganda. The allegation was denied by both the Rwanda Civil Aviation Authority and the Electoral Commission of Uganda. The delay was said to be due to weather issues in Johannesburg.
- 13 February 2016 – The Electoral commission accepted that 20,000 names that were registered during the election process were not existent after two whistle blowers claimed there were some ghost names on the list.

=== Arrests of opposition members ===
- 15 February 2016 – As Kizza Besigye was heading towards his campaign at the Makerere University in Kampala, the Ugandan Police detained the FDC candidate. The police fired tear gas and broke the crowds as the police accused Besigye for violating campaign rules. Besigye was driven outside of Kampala and then released. The Uganda police and Uganda People's Defence Force have been accused of siding with the NRM government to intimidate political opponents.
- 18 February 2016 – Besigye was arrested a second time.
- 19 February 2016 – Ugandan police surrounded and raided Forum for Democratic Change headquarters in Kampala and arrested presidential candidate Kizza Besigye, FDC president Mugisha Muntu, chairman Wasswa Biriggwa and an activist Ingrid Turinawe.
- 21 February 2016 – Besigye, and Amama Mbabazi, another presidential candidate, were both under de facto house arrest and it was reported that General Katumba Wamala was under surveillance.
- 24 February 2016 - Moses Kasibante and Betty Nambooze, two MP-elects, were briefly arrested for revealing documents that describe election fraud taking place.

=== Social media blackout ===
- 18 February 2016 – The government ordered the mobile service providers MTN and Airtel to block social media platforms. The government claims that platforms such as Twitter, Facebook and WhatsApp spread rumors and create unnecessary chaos. The opposition has argued that the ruling was put in place to prevent the public from reporting irregularities in the election process.

=== Checkpoints in Kampala ===
- 19 February 2016 – Ugandan journalists reported "Major junction are like military barracks [with] Checkpoints along major highways."
- 21 February 2016 – Security presence in Kampala was high according to the Associated Press.
- 26 February 2016 – EU and US officials were briefly barred by the police officers posted outside Besigye's house. The officials were only allowed to enter the premise on foot after a high ranking police officer let them in.

=== Violence ===
The New York Times reported that at least two people had been killed and 20 injured in riots during the week of the election.

== Results ==
Museveni was declared the winner on 20 February 2016. Results from the electoral commission showed him with 60.8% of the vote against 35.4% for Besigye. He was sworn in at a ceremony in Kampala on 12 May 2016.

=== President ===
| Candidate | Party | Votes | % |
|---|---|---|---|
| Yoweri Museveni | National Resistance Movement | 5,971,872 | 60.62 |
| Kizza Besigye | Forum for Democratic Change | 3,508,687 | 35.61 |
| Amama Mbabazi | Go Forward | 136,519 | 1.39 |
| Abed Bwanika | People's Development Party | 89,005 | 0.90 |
| Venansius Baryamureeba | Independent | 52,798 | 0.54 |
| Faith Kyalya | Independent | 42,833 | 0.43 |
| Benon Biraaro | Uganda Farmers Party | 25,600 | 0.26 |
| Joseph Mabirizi | Independent | 24,498 | 0.25 |
| Total | | 9,851,812 | 100.00 |
| Valid votes | | 9,851,812 | 95.38 |
| Invalid/blank votes | | 477,319 | 4.62 |
| Total votes | | 10,329,131 | 100.00 |
| Registered voters/turnout | | 15,277,198 | 67.61 |
Source: Electoral Commission, Electoral Commission

=== Parliament ===
| Party | Constituency | | | Women | | | Seats | | |
| Party | Votes | % | Seats | Votes | % | Seats | Appointed | Total | +/– |
|---|---|---|---|---|---|---|---|---|---|
| National Resistance Movement | 3,945,000 | 48.88 | 199 | 3,566,617 | 48.95 | 84 | 10 | 293 | +30 |
| Forum for Democratic Change | 1,027,648 | 12.73 | 29 | 929,860 | 12.76 | 7 | 0 | 36 | +2 |
| Democratic Party | 349,962 | 4.34 | 13 | 246,284 | 3.38 | 2 | 0 | 15 | +3 |
| Uganda People's Congress | 172,781 | 2.14 | 4 | 236,164 | 3.24 | 2 | 0 | 6 | –4 |
| Justice Forum | 20,089 | 0.25 | 0 | 16,741 | 0.23 | 0 | 0 | 0 | –1 |
| Ugandan Federal Alliance | 18,146 | 0.22 | 0 | | | | 0 | 0 | New |
| Conservative Party | 10,792 | 0.13 | 0 | 2,902 | 0.04 | 0 | 0 | 0 | –1 |
| Social Democratic Party | 5,972 | 0.07 | 0 | | | | 0 | 0 | New |
| Republican Women and Youth Party | 2,311 | 0.03 | 0 | 8,502 | 0.12 | 0 | 0 | 0 | New |
| People's Progressive Party | 2,185 | 0.03 | 0 | 16,720 | 0.23 | 0 | 0 | 0 | New |
| Uganda Patriotic Movement | 470 | 0.01 | 0 | | | | 0 | 0 | New |
| Activist Party | 175 | 0.00 | 0 | | | | 0 | 0 | New |
| Independents | 2,515,163 | 31.16 | 44 | 2,261,897 | 31.05 | 17 | 5 | 66 | +23 |
| Uganda People's Defence Force | | | | | | | 10 | 10 | 0 |
| Total | 8,070,694 | 100.00 | 289 | 7,285,687 | 100.00 | 112 | 25 | 426 | +51 |
| Registered voters/turnout | 15,277,198 | – | | 15,277,198 | – | | | | |
Source: Electoral Commission, Electoral Commission

== Reactions ==
=== Domestic ===
- National Resistance Movement Party spokesman, Mike Kennedy Sebalu stated that "It appears as if our message that Uganda should maintain its path of steady progress for all, and not risk an untried and untested opposition, has resonated with the majority of Ugandan voters."
- The Forum for Democratic Change opposition party issued its own election results and one senior FDC official was quoted by Reuters as saying that their statistics showed "glaring discrepancies" with the government's figures.
- On 21 February Kizza Besigye, who was under house arrest, stated "I call upon all of you citizens to protest...The only way to get out of this is to use the popular numbers that we have to make sure that the gunmen do not do what they are doing."

=== International ===
States

- Commonwealth of Nations: Former Nigerian President Olusegun Obasanjo led a 13 member group of monitors to represent the Commonwealth countries. He stated that the group was concerned over "the increased prevalence of money in politics, the misuse of state resources – which led to significant advantages for the incumbent – and the competence, credibility and ability of the Electoral Commission to manage the process effectively and impartially...The inexcusable delays of supply of material to polling stations, particularly in Kampala and its environs, and other deficiences in the process... have seriously detracted from the fairness and credibility of the result of the elections."
- European Union: EU observers reported a mixed reaction to the election and stated that "voting was conducted in a calm and peaceful environment in the vast majority of the country" but noted that the Electoral Commission lacked "transparency and independence." The EU's observers added that, "The National Resistance Movement (NRM's) domination of the political landscape distorted the fairness of the campaign, and state actors were instrumental in creating an intimidating atmosphere."
- United States: On Friday 19 February, Secretary of State John Kerry called President Museveni and according to a statement from the U.S. State Department, "urged President Museveni to rein in the police and security forces, noting that such action calls into question Uganda’s commitment to a transparent and credible election process free from intimidation."
