= 2026 Ugandan general election =

General elections in Uganda

- 15 January 2026
- Presidential election
- Registered: 21,649,067
- Turnout: 52.50% (▼6.85 pp)
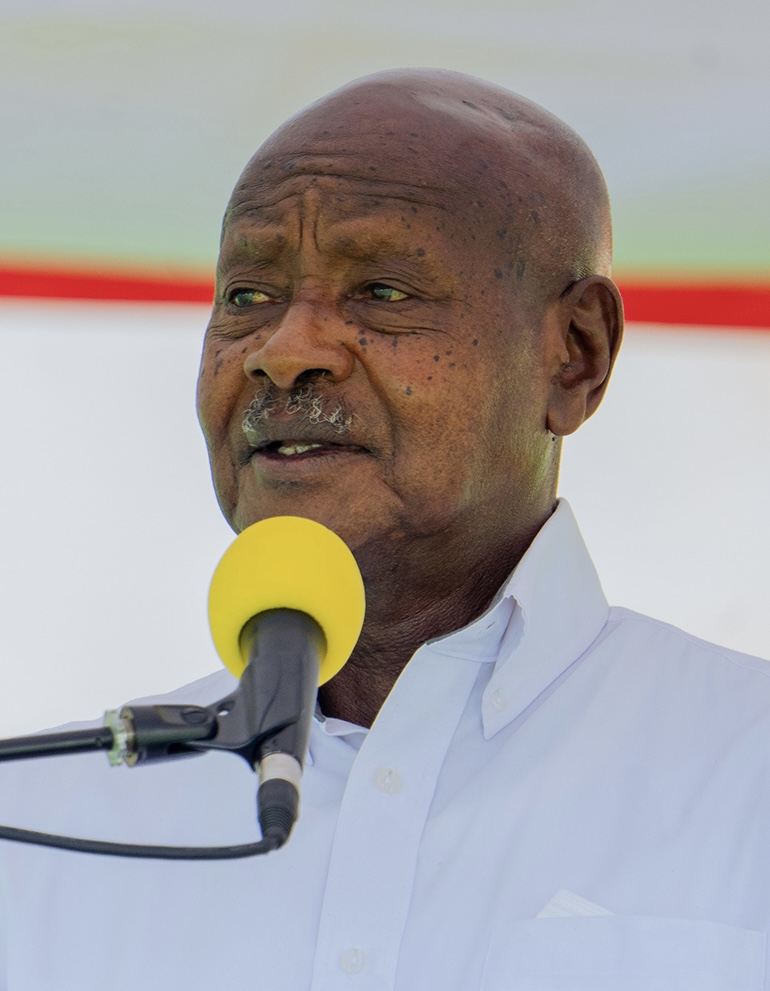

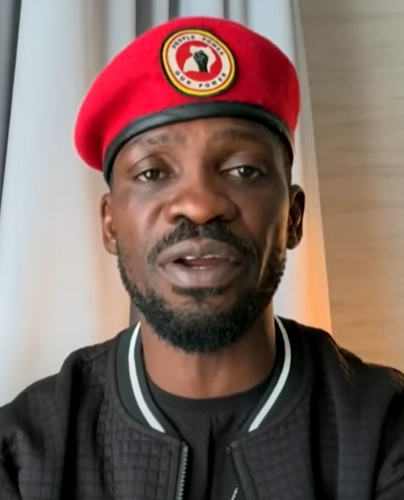
Candidate	Yoweri Museveni	Bobi Wine
Party	NRM	NUP
Popular vote	7,946,772	2,741,238
Percentage	71.65%	24.72%
President before election
Yoweri Museveni
NRM
Elected President
Yoweri Museveni
NRM
- Parliamentary election
- All 529 seats in Parliament; 265 seats needed for a majority
Party	Leader	Vote %	Seats	+/–
NRM	Yoweri Museveni	47.98	372	+36
NUP	Bobi Wine	12.95	49	−8
UPC	Jimmy Micheal Akena	2.41	12	+3
FDC	Patrick Oboi Amuriat	2.36	9	−23
DP	Norbert Mao	1.02	6	−3
PFF		1.26	2	New
ANT	Mugisha Muntu	0.36	1	+1
Independents	–	30.63	68	−6
This lists parties that won seats. See the complete results below.
Speaker of Parliament before	Speaker of Parliament after
Anita Among; NRM	Jacob Oboth-Oboth; NRM

General elections were held in Uganda on 15 January 2026 to elect the President and the Parliament.

The elections were violent and disputed, with the US senate calling it a 'hollow exercise' and Human Rights Watch stating they 'were marred by human rights abuses'. The Ugandan government locked up thousands of opposition supporters, shut down the internet and raided the house of opposition presidential candidate Bobi Wine. The Electoral Commission refused to comment on videos alleging widespread ballot box stuffing.

Incumbent president Yoweri Museveni was announced as the winner of the presidential election with 71.65% of the vote, although no tally was published further amplifying concerns of fraud.

== Electoral system ==
Officially, the president of Uganda is elected using the two-round system, with candidates needing to receive at least 50% + 1 of the vote to be elected in the first round. However, a second round has never taken place since Museveni installed himself as President in 1986. The control of Museveni over the electoral process and the electoral commission make it unlikely that anyone but him or his son Muhoozi Kainerugaba can become President. Muhoozi publicly stated that no civilian can become President and even threatened to behead opposition leader Bobi Wine.

Like many African leaders, it has been Museveni's ambition to be a leader for life. Term limits, preventing him from running again in 2006, were abolished in 2005. The age limit of 75 years, preventing Museveni from running again in 2021, was removed in 2017. Muhoozi was appointed Chief of Defense Forces and is being groomed as his heir to succeed Museveni after his death, although he is widely seen as impulsive.

The elections are supervised by the Electoral Commission of Uganda, who are directly appointed by the President, against recommendations by the European Union that question the Commission's independence.

The Parliament of Uganda has a total of 529 seats, including 353 representatives elected using first-past-the-post voting in single winner constituencies. Using the same method, 146 seats reserved for women are filled, with one seat per district. Finally, 30 seats are indirectly filled via special electoral colleges: 10 by the army, 5 by youths, 5 by elders, 5 by unions, and 5 by people with disabilities. In each of these groups, at least one woman must be elected (at least two for the army group).

== Candidates ==
In June 2025 incumbent president Yoweri Museveni, who has been in office since 1986, announced his candidacy for another (seventh) presidential term. He was formally declared the candidate of his party, the National Resistance Movement the following month and was recognised by the election commission on 23 September 2025.

On 18 August 2025 the National Unity Platform (NUP) and the Democratic Party (DP) applied to register candidates for the presidential election. On 24 September, the Electoral Commission nominated Robert Kyagulanyi Ssentamu, known professionally as Bobi Wine, to run for president.

Kyagulanyi previously contested in the 2021 general election and came second. He denied the results of the election, citing irregularities such as vote rigging and went on to file a presidential election petition in the Supreme Court but later withdrew it.

Four women, including Yvonne Mpambara, gained enough signatures to be considered as potential candidates. None of them were ultimately nominated by the Electoral Commission. Other candidates nominated by the Electoral Commission to contest for Presidency include;

- Rtd. Maj. Gen. Mugisha Muntu of Alliance for National Transformation Party (ANT). Muntu is a former army commander of the Uganda peoples' Defence forces under General Yoweri Museveni as commander-in-Chief, former Forum for Democratic Change President and former Uganda representative to the East African Legislative Assembly in Arusha, Tanzania.
- Hon. Munyagwa Mubarak Sserunga of Common Man's Party (CMP). Munyagwa is a former Mayor for Kawempe Division, former member of Parliament for Kawempe South Constituency in Uganda's capital Kampala and a former chairperson to the Parliamentary Accounts Committee on statutory authorities and state enterprises [COSASE] in the 10th Parliament of Uganda.
- Frank Bulira Kabinga of Revolutionary Peoples Party (RPP)
- Robert Kasibante of National Peasants Party (NPP)
- Nandala Mafabi of Forum for Democratic Change (FDC). Nandala is an economist who previously worked for the World bank and IMF, a cooperatives advocate and chairman for Bugisu Co-operative Union Limited, a former Leader of the Opposition in Parliament and former chair of COSASE in Uganda's Parliament.
- Elton Joseph Mabirizi of Conservative Party (CP). Mabirizi is an engineer and pentecostal preacher of the gospel of Jesus Christ. Mabirizi was previously a presidential candidate in the 2016 general elections, where he garnered 24,498 votes, giving him 0.28% of the total vote.

== Campaign ==
The months preceding the start of the campaign saw a number of government actions against the opposition National Unity Platform. In October 2025, ten NUP members were arrested in northern Uganda, with at least another 95 members charged with minor offences in November 2025. Government actions against the NUP have continued since the start of the campaign. On 6 December 2025, Bobi Wine and several supporters and staff were attacked and beaten by security forces while campaigning in Gulu.

Amnesty International said the election campaign was marred by "a brutal campaign of repression" against the opposition, citing the use of tear gas, pepper spray, beatings and other acts of violence. In a New Year's Eve address on 31 December 2025, president Museveni recommended that the security forces use more tear gas to break up crowds of what he called "the criminal opposition" and defended the dispersal of Bobi Wine supporters with tear gas, saying that "it doesn't kill. It is much better than using live bullets".

The Office of the United Nations High Commissioner for Human Rights accused the Ugandan government of waging lawfare, including military regulations, to restrict activities by opposition politicians and supporters ahead of the election. Simon Mugenyi Byabakama, chair of the Uganda Electoral Commission, acknowledged receiving warnings from senior government figures whom he did not identify not to declare certain candidates as winners. On 13 January 2026, the Uganda Communications Commission imposed a suspension of mobile internet services, citing misinformation, electoral fraud and incitement of violence. Bobi Wine accused the government of using the internet blackout to carry out ballot-stuffing and arrests of his party officials.

== Conduct ==
On election day, polling was delayed by up to four hours in several constituencies, with the electoral commission blaming "technical glitches" that included failures of biometric identification kits and a lack of equipment. The commission advised polling officers to use paper registration records to prevent voters from being disenfranchised. Voting, which was supposed to end at 16:00 EAT, was extended by one hour. After polling closed, human rights activist Agather Atuhaire said security forces shot dead at least ten opposition supporters who had gathered at the residence of MP Muwanga Kivumbi in Butambala District to follow the release of results. Police said they had opened fire after opposition "goons" organised by Kivumbi attacked a police station with machetes, axes and boxes of matches.

== Results ==
Initial results released on 16 January showed Yoweri Museveni leading the presidential count with 76.25% of the vote, followed by Bobi Wine with 19.85%. That same day, Bobi Wine was placed under house arrest. Wine's supporters protested the results with at least seven protesters killed overnight from January 15 to 16. On 16 January, security forces raided Wine's residence, resulting in Wine fleeing to an undisclosed location. Wine insisted that the official results were "fake", adding that his wife and other relatives remained under house arrest. On 19 January, military commander Muhoozi Kainerugaba issued a 48-hour ultimatum for Wine's surrender.

Electoral Commission chair Justice Simon Byabakama declared that Museveni had been re-elected as president on 17 January, stating that he won 71.65% of votes. Bobi Wine came in second place with 24.72% of the vote. Wine rejected the election outcome alleging widespread fraud, while Munyagwa Mubarak Sserunga planned to challenge the results in court over failures of biometric voter verification kits in opposition strongholds.

Candidates from the other main opposition parties trailed far behind, with FDC candidate Nandala Mafabi receiving 1.88% of the vote, while ANT candidate Mugisha Muntu received 0.53% of the vote. Smaller candidates were also similarly behind, with Frank Bulira Kabinga receiving 0.41%, followed by Robert Kasibante with 0.30%, Mubarak Sserunga with 0.29%, and Elton Joseph Mabirizi with 0.21%. Turnout in the election was 52.5%. Following his victory, Museveni referred to Bobi Wine and members of the opposition as "traitors" and "terrorists" and accused them of trying to foment violence during the election. On 22 January, Muwanga Kivumbi was arrested.

Former Nigerian President Goodluck Jonathan, who represented a group of election monitors from the African Union and other regional bodies, said the election had been held peacefully and found no evidence of ballot stuffing, but added that "reports of intimidation, arrest and abductions" against the opposition and civil society "instilled fear and eroded public trust in the electoral process", while the internet shutdown disrupted "effective observation" of the vote and "increased suspicion".

The US Senate called the election "a hollow exercise, staged to legitimize President Yoweri Museveni's seventh term and four decades in power".

=== President ===
Candidate	Party	Votes	%
Yoweri Museveni	National Resistance Movement	7,946,772	71.65
Bobi Wine	National Unity Platform	2,741,238	24.72
Nandala Mafabi	Forum for Democratic Change	209,039	1.88
Mugisha Muntu	Alliance for National Transformation	59,276	0.53
Frank Bulira Kabinga	Revolutionary People's Party	45,959	0.41
Robert Kasibante	National Peasants Party	33,440	0.30
Munyagwa Mubarak Sserunga	Common Man's Party	31,666	0.29
Elton Joseph Mabirizi	Conservative Party	23,458	0.21
Total		11,090,848	100.00
Valid votes		11,090,848	97.58
Invalid/blank votes		275,353	2.42
Total votes		11,366,201	100.00
Registered voters/turnout		21,649,067	52.50
Source: Daily Monitor

=== Parliament ===
Many prominent MPs were unseated including Mathias Mpuuga, Ibrahim Ssemujju Nganda, Abed Bwanika and Asuman Basalirwa.

Party	Constituency			Women			Special Interests Groups			Total seats	+/–
Party	Votes	%	Seats	Votes	%	Seats	Votes	%	Seats	Total seats	+/–
National Resistance Movement	5,000,564	47.98	249	5,015,892	49.84	109	7,740	44.13	14	372	+36
National Unity Platform	1,349,645	12.95	39	1,550,819	15.41	10	31	0.18	0	49	–8
Uganda People's Congress	250,864	2.41	8	301,721	3.00	4	343	1.96	0	12	+3
Forum for Democratic Change	245,988	2.36	6	255,848	2.54	3	21	0.12	0	9	–23
People's Front for Freedom	131,055	1.26	0	70,832	0.70	2				2	New
Democratic Party	106,583	1.02	6	18,216	0.18	0	11	0.06	0	6	–3
Democratic Front	64,501	0.62	0	39,220	0.39	0				0	New
Alliance for National Transformation	37,197	0.36	1	1,434	0.01	0	1	0.01	0	1	+1
People's Progressive Party	14,482	0.14	0							0	–1
Justice Forum	13,048	0.13	0	3,374	0.03	0	3	0.02	0	0	–1
Uganda Patriotic Movement	5,769	0.06	0							0	New
National Peasants' Party	4,357	0.04	0							0	New
Common Man's Party	2,178	0.02	0	2,242	0.02	0				0	New
Ecological Party of Uganda	1,874	0.02	0							0	0
Conservative Party	595	0.01	0							0	0
National Economic Empowerment Dialogue	504	0.00	0	1,720	0.02	0				0	New
Society for Peace and Development	186	0.00	0							0	New
Congress Service Volunteers Organisation				155	0.00	0				0	0
Uganda People's Defence Force							4,541	25.89	10	10	0
Independent	3,192,557	30.63	44	2,803,502	27.85	18	4,849	27.65	6	68	–6
Total	10,421,947	100.00	353	10,064,975	100.00	146	17,540	100.00	30	529	0
Source: Electoral Commission
