= Elton Joseph Mabirizi =

Ugandan politician, Christian leader, and electrical engineer (born 1975)

- Born: July 1975 (age 51); Mpigi District, Uganda
- Education: Katwe Primary School; St. John’s Secondary School, Mityana; Aldram Institute of Theology and Counseling (Diploma in Counseling); Mengo Technical Institute (Electrical Engineering); City and Guilds of London Institute (Advanced Diploma in Electrical Engineering Science); Bloemfontein, South Africa (Diploma)
- Occupations: Politician, Christian leader, Electrical engineer
- Organization: Ambassadors of Jesus Christ Church (Founder)
- Known for: 2016 presidential candidate; Conservative Party flag bearer for 2026
- Political party: Conservative Party (Uganda)
- Spouse: Winnie Mabirizi

Elton Joseph Mabirizi, also known as Joseph Mabirizi (born July 1975) is a Ugandan politician, Christian leader, and electrical engineer. He contested as a presidential candidate in the 2016 Ugandan general election under the banner of an independent candidate.

He is the Conservative Party (Uganda) flag bearer for the presidency of the 2026 Ugandan general election.

== Early life and education ==
Mabirizi was born in July 1975 in Mpigi District, Uganda to Alice Nabulya Nalongo (Mmther) as the second-last born in a family of eleven children. He attended Katwe Primary School before joining St.John's Secondary School in Mityana District for his O-Level and A-Level education. He then went to Aldram Institute of Theology and Counseliling,where he attained a Diploma in Counseliling,before joining Mengo Technical Institute, where he studied electrical engineering. He also attained an Advanced Diploma in Electrical Engineering Science from City and Guilds in the United Kingdom and another diploma from Bloemfontein in South Africa.

== Career ==
Before joining politics, Mabirizi worked as an electrical technician under Uganda Electricity Board for eight years and later as a consultant in Uganda and South Africa. Alongside his technical work, he participated in faith-based outreach programmes and public speaking engagements, being the founder of Ambassadors of Jesus Christ Church.

== Political career ==
=== 2026 presidential election ===
In September 2025, Mabirizi was nominated and revealed as the Conservative Party presidential candidate in the 2026 general election. His election focuses on political reform, re-examining the constitution, and organizing of the administration.

He has called for participation in elections and campaigning on policy in the course of 2026's election period, where he revealed a coalition with a group of past presidential candidates to organize a combined challenge against Uganda's long-serving Yoweri Museveni.

=== 2016 presidential election ===
Mabirizi contested for the 2016 presidential election as an Independent where he got 24,498 (0.25%) votes.

== Personal life ==
Mabirizi is married to Winnie Mabirizi and is a practicing Christian who has founded several churches across Uganda.

== See also ==
- Ken Lukyamuzi
- Munyagwa Mubarak Sserunga
- Politics of Uganda
- Conservative Party (Uganda)
- 2026 Ugandan general election
- List of political parties in Uganda
