= Abdu Katuntu =

Ugandan politician

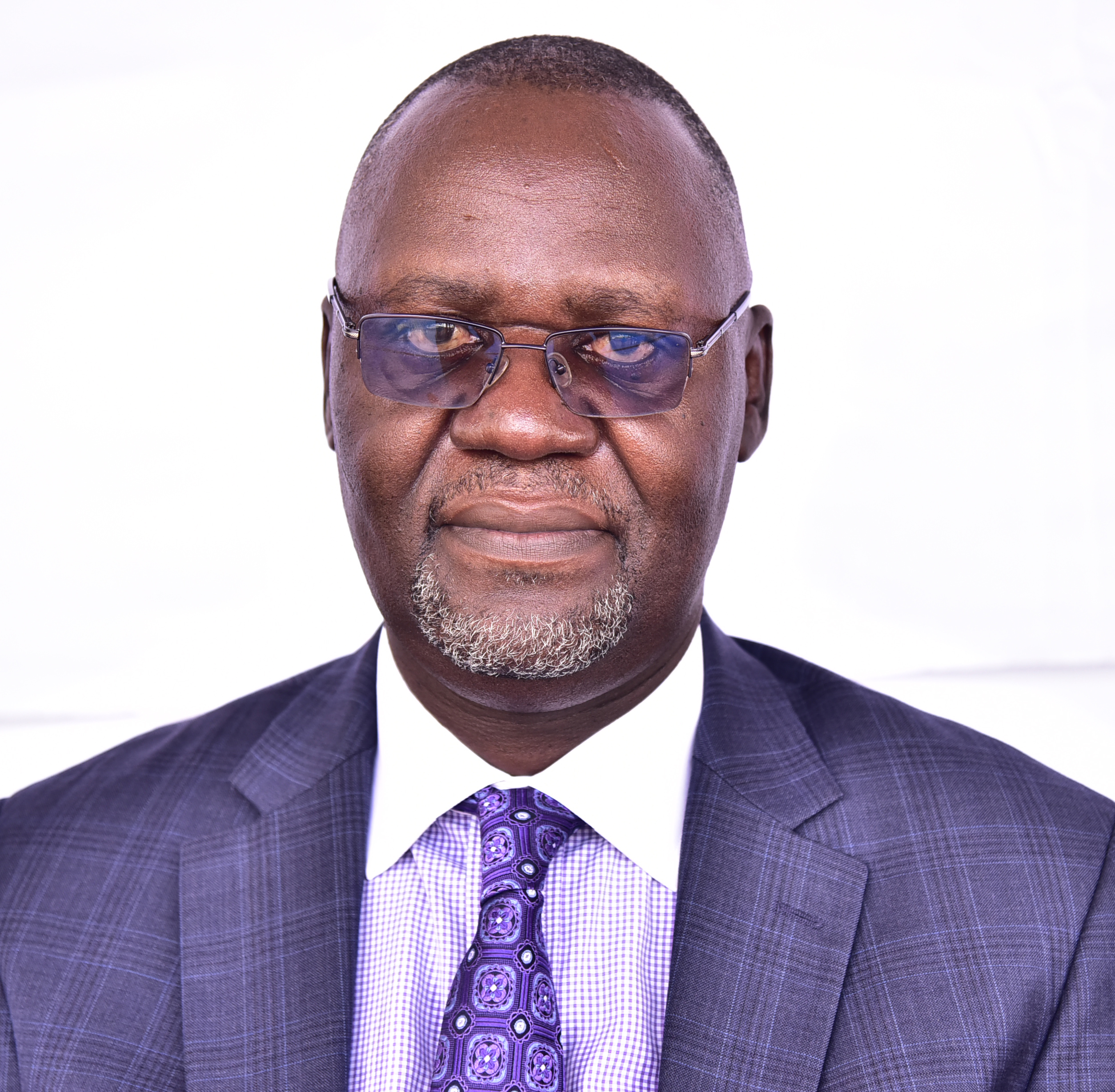
- Preceded by: Munyagwa Mubarak Sserunga as Commissions, Statutory Authorities and State Enterprises (COSASE)
- Constituency: Bugweri

Personal details
- Born: December 3, 1965 (age 60) Butende
- Party: Independent
- Education: Makerere University
- Profession: Lawyer

Abdu Katuntu (born 3 December 1965) is a Ugandan politician and lawyer who served as a Member of Parliament for Bugweri County in Bugweri District for 25 years. He lost his seat during the 2026 general elections to Sadala Wandera, a member of the National Resistance Movement.

== Early life and education ==
Katuntu was born and raised in Bugweri district. He studied at Buyanga Church of Uganda Primary School, Iganga Town Council Primary School, Kiira College Butiki and Busoga College Mwiri, before joining Makerere University for a Bachelor of Laws degree and a Diploma in Law from the Law Development Centre.

== Work experience and political career ==
Katuntu is a former member of the Pan-African Parliament representing Uganda and served as the Rapporteur of the Committee on Justice and Human Rights.

Katuntu worked for Kadaga and Company Advocates, a law firm owned by Rebecca Kadaga.

He was a member of the Forum for Democratic Change party until 2021. He served as the Shadow Attorney General in the Parliament of Uganda until 2018, when he was replaced by Wilfred Niwagaba.

Katuntu was first elected to the Parliament of Uganda in 2001.

He lost his parliamentary seat in the 2006 Ugandan general election to Kirunda Kivejinja but challenged the result, citing widespread malpractice. The court found that "during the campaign period and on polling day, there was widespread intimidation and torture in Bugweri Constituency," which biased the result in favor of Kivejinja. Katuntu won the resulting by-election.

Katuntu was re-elected for another term in Parliament in the 2011 general elections.

Katuntu served as the chairman of the Parliamentary Committee on Rules and Discipline. This committee concluded that Francis Zaake was guilty of insulting Anita Among, resulting in his removal from the position of Parliamentary Commissioner.

Katuntu was the chairperson of the Parliamentary Committee on Commissions, Statutory Authorities, and State Enterprises (COSASE). He was replaced by Mubarak Munyagwa in 2019.

Katuntu is known for recovering 47 billion Ugandan shillings from rogue Chinese road construction firms in 2016.

Katuntu headed the Parliament of Uganda's task force on COVID-19, assisted by five other members of Parliament. The members were tasked with assessing the role of private health sector players.

Abdu Katuntu joined NRM in 2024. He lost his MP seat to NRM's Sadala Wandera.

== Controversies ==
Katuntu was described by Yoweri Museveni as a "poisonous mushroom" who was out to suffocate government programs, as he addressed a rally in Busesa, Bugweri County.

Julius Galisonga, a candidate for the Forum for Democratic Change in the 2021 general election, filed an election petition against Katuntu at the Jinja High Court. Galisonga accused Katuntu of conspiring with the Uganda Electoral Commission to undermine the fairness of the election process. Katuntu had won the election with 17,813 votes, while Galisonga received 9,074 votes.

== See also ==
- List of members of the ninth Parliament of Uganda
- List of members of the tenth Parliament of Uganda
