= Kasibante Robert =

Ugandan entrepreneur and politician (born 1988)

- Born: 1988 (age 37–38); Busujju, Mityana District, Uganda
- Education: Makerere University Business School
- Occupations: Entrepreneur, politician
- Known for: Founding Victory School of Hospitality Management and Beauty
- Notable work: Youth skills development and empowerment programs
- Office: Presidential flag bearer of the National Peasants Party
- Political party: National Peasants Party (NPP)

Kasibante Robert (born 1988) is a Ugandan entrepreneur and politician. He is also the founder and managing director of Victory School of Hospitality Management and Beauty and the presidential flag bearer of the National Peasants Party (NPP) for the 2026 general election of Uganda.

== Early life and education ==
Kasibante was born in 1988 in Busujju, Mityana District, Uganda. He holds a bachelor's degree in Business Administration and a master's degree in Human Resource Management from Makerere University Business School (MUBS).

== Career ==
Kasibante established the Victory School of Beauty and Hospitality Management in 2015, which provides cosmetology, spa therapy, hospitality, and business management courses.

As of 2019, he indicated that the school had graduated more than 40,000 Ugandan youths in its skills development programs.

=== Political career ===
Kasibante is a National Peasants Party member and on 23 September 2025 was nominated by Electoral Commission of Uganda as 2026 general election presidential candidate.

His campaign agenda includes rural development, youth employment, agricultural transformation, and reducing economic inequality.

His endorsement signatures were challenged at the time of his nomination by the Electoral Commission but later cleared him to run. Newspaper reports suggested organizational problems within his campaign, such as failed attendances at planned rallies.

== See also ==
- Elections in Uganda
- Politics of Uganda
