= Betty Nambooze =

Ugandan politician

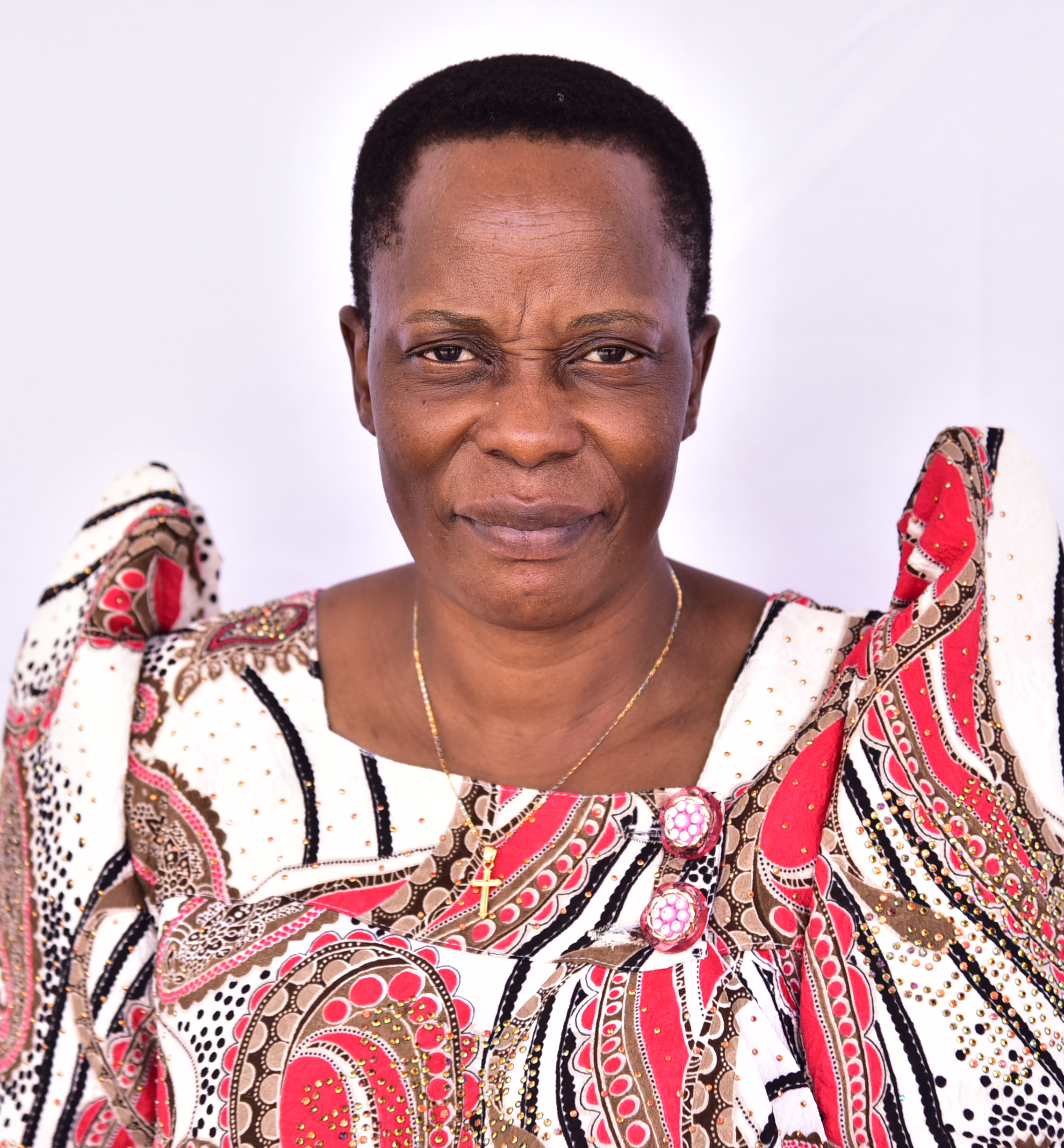
- Bakireke Nambooze Betty (2021)
- Born: 13 July 1969 (age 57); Mukono, Uganda
- Citizenship: Uganda
- Education: Bishop's Senior Secondary School
- Alma mater: Uganda Martyrs University (Diploma in Development Studies); Law Development Center (Diploma in Law)
- Occupations: Journalist and politician
- Years active: 1993–present
- Title: Member of Parliament
- Political party: National Unity Platform
- Spouse: Henry Bakireke (m. 2002)
- Awards: Uganda Martyrs University (Diploma in Development Studies )

Betty Nambooze Bakireke, commonly known as Betty Nambooze (born 13 July 1969), is a Ugandan journalist and politician. She serves as the Member of Parliament representing Mukono Municipality, Mukono District

== Early life and education ==
Betty Nambooze was born in Mukono District, on 13 July 1969. She attended Bishop's Senior Secondary School in Mukono, graduating in 1986. She attended the Law Development Centre, graduating with a Diploma in Law in 1998. In 2010, she was awarded a Diploma in Development Studies by Uganda Martyrs University.

== Career ==
Nambooze was first elected to parliament in May 2010, when in a by-election, running on the Democratic Party ticket, she defeated the then incumbent MP, Peter Bakaluba Mukasa of the ruling National Resistance Movement. According to her parliamentary profile, Nambooze worked as a news reporter (stringer), between 1993 and 2000. From 2000 until 2004, she worked as a law enforcement officer. From 2004 until 2005, she served as a personnel officer. She worked as a radio presenter between 2000 and 2009 at CBS FM. From 2005 until 2010, she served as the spokesperson for the Democratic Party in Uganda.

== Arrests ==
On 24 February 2016, she was briefly arrested along with MP-elect Moses Kasibante for revealing documents describing election fraud taking place during the country's recent election.

Nambooze has been arrested on numerous occasions on various politically-motivated, often trumped-up charges, but she has not as of yet been convicted in any court of law. Her life has also been threatened and even poisoned because of her political activities.

== Change to NUP ==
On 13 August 2020, Nambooze was declared a member of the National Unity Platform political party, joining forces with his fellow member of parliament Kyagulanyi Sentamu Robert, a.k.a. "Bobi Wine", the party president. Together with her other party members, were set on Mission 2021, a party mission to unseat the ruling party in the 2021 elections.

In the 2021 parliamentary elections, Namboze won another term of office (2021-2026) to represent Mukono municipality on the NUP ticket after defeating her closest competitors, George Fred Kagimu of Democratic Party (DP) and Abbas Ssozi of National resistance Movement (NRM).

In the 2026 general elections, she won another term on the NUP ticket and will serve as Member of Parliament for Mukono Municipality from 2026 to 2031. She is the incumbent MP for Mukono Municipality in the 12th Parliament.

On 19 October, police probed an attack on Nambooze's home. They recovered two brand new pangas hidden in a sack in a small garden of tomatoes.

She was re-elected as the member of parliament for Mukono Municipality in Uganda's 12th Parliament (2026–2031) under the National Unity Platform (NUP). She successfully retained her seat in the 2026 general election after being declared the winner by the Electoral Commission. She took her official oath alongside other lawmakers at the Parliament House in Kampala, marking the start of her journey in the 12th Parliament term.

She is the Chairperson of Parliament's Local Government Public Accounts Committee (PAC) in the 12th parliament of Uganda.

Age limit incident

On Tuesday, september 27, 2017 a chaotic incident occurred in parliament over the amendment of the age limit bil,l and she was seriously injured.

== Parliamentary duties ==
Nambooze sits on the Committee on Public Service and Local Government, and the Committee on Local Government Accounts.

== Personal life ==
In November 2002, Nambooze married Henry Bakireke. The two met in high school in the 1980s. Together, they are the parents of over six children, both natural and adopted.
