= Walk to work protest =

Protests that occurred in Uganda in April 2011

The Walk to Work protests occurred in Uganda in April 2011, as a reaction to the high cost of living. The protests took place following presidential elections in February 2011, and involved several defeated opposition candidates. The protests were suppressed by the government of Yoweri Museveni, resulting in five deaths.

== History ==
The first Walk to Work protest took place on 11 April 2011, and was organised by the pressure group Activists for Change (A4C), which included the Forum for Democratic Change, the party of three-time presidential candidate Kizza Besigye. Besigye had recently lost a presidential election against Yoweri Museveni in February 2011. The 11 April protest called on workers to walk to work to highlight the increased cost of transport in Uganda. In February 2011, Ugandan inflation was running at 11%.

The Walk to Work protest was organized in response to a comment by President Museveni on the increased cost of fuel, which had risen by 50% between January and April 2011. He said: "What I call on the public to do is to use fuel sparingly. Don't drive to bars."

The 11 April protest was disrupted by police, who fired tear gas and arrested Besigye and Democratic Party leader Norbert Mao. In the course of the protest, Besigye was shot in the right arm by a rubber bullet. The government blamed the violence on protesters.

In response, on April 14, the protests spread to other Ugandan cities, including Gulu and Masaka, prompting further clashes between protesters and police. By 15 April, five people had been shot and killed by police, with dozens injured and hundreds arrested. Further protests took place on 21 and 29 April, resulting in four further deaths, 100 injuries and 600 arrests. According to Human Rights Watch, none of those killed were actively involved in the protests.
