= Jehoash Mayanja Nkangi =

Ugandan lawyer, civil servant and politician

Minister of Justice and Constitutional Affairs
- In office 1998–2008
- President: Yoweri Museveni

Minister of Finance
- In office February 1992 – May 1998
- President: Yoweri Museveni
- Preceded by: Crispus Kiyonga
- Succeeded by: Gerald Ssendaula

Katikkiro of Buganda
- In office 8 January 1987 – 18 December 1990
- Monarch: Muwenda Mutebi II of Buganda
- Preceded by: Office restored
- Succeeded by: Joseph Ssemwogerere

Minister of Education
- In office 1986–1989
- President: Yoweri Museveni

Katikkiro of Buganda
- In office 18 November 1964 – 1966
- Monarch: Mutesa II of Buganda
- Preceded by: Michael Kintu
- Succeeded by: Office abolished (1966–1993)

Personal details
- Born: 22 August 1932 Kalungu District, British Protectorate of Uganda
- Died: 6 March 2017 (aged 84) Nakasero Hospital, Kampala, Uganda
- Education: Makerere University (Bachelor of Arts); University of Oxford (Master of Arts in Political Science & Economics); Lincoln’s Inn of Courts (Barrister-at-Law)
- Profession: Lawyer & politician

Jehoash Ssibakyalyawo Mayanja Nkangi or Joash Mayanja Nkangi (22 August 1932 – 6 March 2017) was a Ugandan lawyer, civil servant and politician. At the time of his death, he was the immediate past chairman of the Uganda Land Commission. He previously served as a cabinet minister in several ministries in the Cabinet of Uganda.

From 1962 until 1993, Mayanja Nkanji served as the "Katikkiro" (prime minister) under Sir Edward Muteesa II, the Kabaka of Buganda, who reigned from 1939 until 1969. In 1993, when the Kingdom of Buganda was re-instated, he was instrumental in the installation of the present monarch, Ronald Muwenda Mutebi II.

== Background and education ==
He was born on 22 August 1932 to Isaya Sibakyalwayo and Yozefina Nantale in what was Masaka District at that time, but today is part of Kalungu District to parents, Isaya Sibakyalwayo and Yozefina Nantale. He attended Kaabungo Masaka Primary School from 1937 to 1946, Kako Junior School from 1944 to 1946, and King's College Budo for secondary school from 1947 to 1949. In 1950, he joined Makerere University, then a constituent college of the University of London, graduating with a Bachelor of Arts in 1953.

In 1954, he was admitted to Keble College, Oxford on scholarship, graduating with a Master of Arts in politics, philosophy and economics in 1960. He also became certified as a barrister following his training at Lincoln's Inn of Courts in the United Kingdom.

== Early career ==
While at Oxford, Nkangi studied law at Lincoln's Inn of Courts in London, then returned to Uganda in 1960 where he set up his law practice. He also joined pre-independence Ugandan politics. He formed a political party called the "United Party"; later called the "United National Party" (UNP). In 1962, he abandoned the UNP and joined the Kabaka Yekka (KY) political party. He was elected to represent Masaka East Constituency in the Ugandan Parliament, in May 1962. Following independence on 9 October 1962, Nkangi served as minister without portfolio in the ministry of economic affairs. Then as the commerce and industry minister. On 17 August 1964, Nkangi, at age 33 years and a bachelor, was elected Buganda's katikkiro by the Lukiiko in a landslide. Looking back, Nkangi says his humble beginnings must have marketed him. "The Kabaka did not know me personally."

Trouble started in early 1966. On 15 April 1966, the 1962 Uganda constitution was abrogated during a parliamentary session in which Milton Obote, the then prime minister, was surrounded by Uganda Army troops. The Buganda lukiiko (parliament) passed a resolution to eject the central government from Buganda; essentially declaring Buganda's secession from Uganda. In response, Obote ordered Idi Amin, the army commander at the time to attack the Kabaka's palace at Mengo. The assault came on 24 May 1966. Both Muteesa and Nkangi fled to the United Kingdom. Nkangi went via Nairobi, in Kenya. In 1967, Obote abolished the cultural kingdoms and put a new constitution in place.

== Exile ==
While in exile, he was able to find work as a research fellow at Lancaster University. Also while there, he was able to witness the Kabaka's written desire to have his son Ronald Muwenda Mutebi succeed the Buganda throne, when that time came. After Muteesa died on 21 November 1969, Mayanja Nkangi, in his capacity as Katikkiro, proclaimed the death, as is the custom. He returned to Uganda in April to arrange and partly oversee the deceased king's funereal in April 1971.

== After exile ==
Following the removal of the Obote I regime in 1971, Nkangi returned to Uganda and re-opened his law practice. Although Amin spied on him, he generally left him alone, once he learnt that Nkangi had no plans to undermine his government. Following the overthrow of Idi Amin in 1979, Nkangi formed the Conservative Party (Uganda).

When the Obote II government (1980–1985) was overthrown by the military junta led by Tito Okello Lutwa, Nkangi was appointed minister of labour, serving in that capacity from August 1985 until January 1986.

Under the National Resistance Movement administration, led by Yoweri Museveni, Nkangi served as minister of education, minister of planning, minister of finance and ministry of justice. His tenure in Museveni's cabinet lasted from 1986 until 2001. After his retirement from cabinet, he was appointed chairman of the Uganda Land Commission, serving in that capacity from 2002 until 2012.

In 2010, he was appointed Chairman of the Uganda Land Commission, which he held from 2010 until 2013. In later life, he wrote an autobiography, titled "Out of Empire into Servitude."

== Other considerations ==
During his tenure as the minister of education (1986 - 1989), he oversaw the creation of Kyambogo University. While he served as the minister of planning (1989 - 1992), he oversaw the creation of the Uganda Investment Authority.

== Death ==
He died on 6 March 2017 at Nakasero Hospital where he had been hospitalized since February 2017, at the age of 84. The cause of death was reported to be pneumonia. He was buried on 10 March 2017 at his ancestral home at Mwalo-Budda Masaka City. Among the mourners were Uganda's vice president Edward Ssekandi, the Katikkiro of Buganda Charles Peter Mayiga, members of parliament and religious leaders.

== See also ==
- List of political parties in Uganda
- Politics of Uganda
- Cabinet of Uganda
- Muteesa I Royal University

Preceded by Micheal Kintu as Katikkiro of Buganda	Joash Mayanja Nkangi as Katikkiro of Buganda; 1964 – 1993	Succeeded by Mulwanyamuli Ssemwogerere
