= Patrick Rubaihayo =

Ugandan politician and Academician

- Born: 1940 April 04
- Died: 2024 May 14 (aged 84)
- Citizenship: Ugandan
- Occupation: Academic Plant breeder Politician
- Employer: Makerere University
- Title: Professor
- Children: 11

Patrick Rubaihayo (4 April 1940 – 14 May 2024) was a Ugandan academic, plant breeder, biotechnologist, and politician. He served as Professor Emeritus at Makerere University, where he taught and conducted research for over five decades in the fields of plant breeding, tissue culture, and agricultural biotechnology. He also served as Member of Parliament for Mbarara Central and as State Minister for Agriculture in the second government of President Milton Obote (1981–1985).

== Early life and education ==
Rubaihayo was born on 4 April 1940 in Mbarara District, Uganda. His early education included attendance at Mbarara Junior School, Mitooma Primary School, Kabwohe Primary School, Mbarara High School, Kigezi College Butobere, and Ntare School. He earned a Bachelor of Science in Botany and a Master of Science in Agriculture from Makerere University, followed by further studies at the University of Illinois at Urbana-Champaign and postdoctoral research at Ohio State University.

== Academic career ==
Rubaihayo joined Makerere University as a lecturer in 1972. He rose through the ranks to become Senior Lecturer, Associate Professor, and full Professor (1990–2005). In 2005, he was appointed Professor Emeritus and continued his association with the university until his death. He taught and supervised research in the College of Agricultural and Environmental Sciences, with contributions to plant breeding, banana production systems, tissue and cell culture, molecular biology applications in crops such as bananas, sweet potatoes, and soybeans, and other agricultural research projects.

== Political career ==
In 1980–1981, Rubaihayo was elected Member of Parliament for Mbarara Central (also referred to in some reports as Mbarara North). From 1981 to 1985, he served as State Minister for Agriculture, Forestry and Fisheries in the second Obote government. During this period, he contributed to programmes including the Coffee Rehabilitation Programme and the Agriculture Rehabilitation Project. He was a member of the Uganda People's Congress (UPC) and later served as Chairman of the Milton Obote Foundation.

== Scientific contributions ==
Rubaihayo conducted extensive research in plant breeding and agricultural biotechnology. His work included studies on banana production systems, molecular diversity in bananas and sweet potatoes, variability in potato and cowpea viruses, and soybean genotypes. He collaborated on evaluations of advanced-generation soybean lines and supported initiatives in banana breeding and processing. He was also involved in efforts to promote biotechnology applications in Ugandan agriculture.

== Personal life and death ==
Patrick Rubaihayo married Elizabeth Byanjeru Kakonge in 1966 until her death on May 19th 2004. Elizabeth was a sister to John Kakonge former Secretary General of Uganda People's Congress and Professor Edward Kakonge of Makerere University. He later was married to Miriam K. Rubaihayo. He had 11 children and 24 grandchildren. He died on 14 May 2024 at his home in Rubare, Mbarara District, after feeling unwell following dinner. He was buried on 19 May 2024 at his ancestral village of Rwenshanku in Kashari, Mbarara District.
