= 1962 Ugandan general election =

General elections were held in Uganda on 25 April 1962 in preparation for independence on 9 October. However, elections were not held in all parts of the country, with the Parliament of Buganda nominating 21 members (all of whom belonged to the Kabaka Yekka party) to the national parliament instead. The result was a victory for the Uganda People's Congress, which won 37 of the 82 seats, and went on to form a coalition government with Kabaka Yekka, with Milton Obote as Prime Minister.

== Results ==
The Uganda People's Congress (UPC) secured 37 direct seats, the Democratic Party won 24, while Kabaka Yekka (KY) won all 21 Bugandan seats through nomination by Buganda's parliament.

Party	Votes	%	Seats	+/–
Uganda People's Congress	545,324	51.81	37	+2
Democratic Party	484,933	46.07	24	−19
Uganda National Congress	2,565	0.24	0	−1
Bataga Party of Busoga	2,375	0.23	0	New
Uganda National Union	39	0.00	0	New
Independents	17,308	1.64	0	−2
Kabaka Yekka			21	New
Total	1,052,544	100.00	82	0
Registered voters/turnout	1,553,233	–		
Source: Nohlen et al.

== Aftermath ==
Disputes over the ‘lost counties’ prompted a 1964 referendum, resulting in the transfer of Buyaga and Bugangaizi to Bunyoro and igniting tensions that ultimately fractured the UPC–KY coalition.
