= Munyagwa Mubarak Sserunga =

Ugandan lawyer and politician (born 1979)

President of the Common Man's Party (CMP)
- Incumbent
- Assumed office February 2025

Chairperson, COSASE
- In office 2019–2021
- Succeeded by: Abdu Katuntu

Member of Parliament for Kawempe South
- In office 2017–2021
- Succeeded by: Bashir Kazibwe Mbaziira

Mayor, Kawempe Division
- In office 2011–2016

Personal details
- Born: 1979 (age 46–47) Murwera, Mahyoro Sub-county, Kitagwenda District
- Party: former Forum for Democratic Change (FDC) member
- Education: LLB (Makerere University), Diploma in Law (Law Development Centre)
- Alma mater: Makerere University, Law Development Centre
- Occupation: Lawyer, Politician
- Known for: Former COSASE Chairperson, Former MP Kawempe South

Munyagwa Mubarak Sserunga also known as Mugati Gwa Bata (buttered bread) (born in 1979) is a Ugandan lawyer and politician formally affiliated to Forum for Democratic Change (FDC) as secretary for mobilization. He is a former Mayor of Kawempe Division and one term member of parliament for Kawempe South Constituency in the 10th Parliament in Kampala District currently contesting for presidency of Uganda under Common Man's Party, formerly the Uganda Economic Party as its Chairman.

He is a former Chairperson for the Committee on Commissions, Statutory Authorities and State Enterprises (COSASE) in the Parliament of Uganda from 2019 to 2021.

== Early life and education ==
Munyagwa was born in Murwera, Mahyoro Sub-county, Kitagwenda District in Western Uganda. He began his education at Mahyoro Primary School before joining Kitagwenda High School for his O-Level education. He joined Nakasero Secondary School for his high school education and before pursuing law, he enrolled for university studies at Makerere University in Commerce but did not complete due to financial constraints. He later joined the Law Development Centre where he graduated with a diploma in Law and attained a Bachelors degree in Law from Makerere University.

== Political career ==
Munyagwa joined elective politics in 2011 and was elected Mayor of Kawempe Division under Forum for Democratic Change (FDC). He gained popularity for his vocal criticism of government policies and his participation in opposition-led protests such as the Walk to Work demonstrations in 2011.

He was Member of Parliament for Kawempe South Constituency in Uganda's eleventh Parliament on a Forum for Democratic Change (FDC) he however lost his seat the 2021 general election to former journalist Bashir Kazibwe Mbaziira of the National Unity Platform.

Munyagwa was elected the Chairperson of the Parliamentary Committee on Commissions, Statutory Authorities and State Enterprises (COSASE) in 2019, taking over from Abdu Katuntu.

Munyagwa contested for presidency for the 2026 Uganda elections.

== Formation of Common Man's Party ==
In February 2025, Munyagwa was sworn in as President of the Common Man's Party (CMP), a rebrand of the Uganda Economic Party. He announced plans to contest in the 2026 Ugandan presidential election.

== See also ==
- Parliament of Uganda
- Politics of Uganda
- Kawempe Division
- 2026 General elections in Uganda
- Kasibante Robert
