= 1958 Ugandan general election =

General elections were held in Uganda between 20 and 24 October 1958. They were the first elections to the Legislative Council, and were boycotted by the Ganda. The result was a victory for the Uganda National Congress, which won five of the ten seats.

== Results ==
Party	Votes	%	Seats
Uganda National Congress	161,042	30.14	5
Democratic Party	140,740	26.34	1
United Congress Party	10,095	1.89	0
Progressive Party	5,274	0.99	0
Independents	217,175	40.64	4
Total	534,326	100.00	10
Valid votes	534,326	99.04	
Invalid/blank votes	5,164	0.96	
Total votes	539,490	100.00	
Registered voters/turnout	626,046	86.17	
Source: Sternberger et al.
