= Alliance for National Transformation =

Ugandan political party

- Leader: Mugisha Muntu
- Secretary: Alice Alaso
- Founded: 19 March 2019; 7 years ago
- National Assembly of Uganda: 1 / 529

Website
- https://www.ant.ug/

The Alliance for National Transformation (ANT), founded on 19 March 2019, is a political party in Uganda.

== Background ==
The Forum for Democratic Change (FDC) was the leading opposition party in Uganda during the 2000s and 2010s. On three consecutive occasions, during the presidential elections in 2006, 2011 and 2016, the party fielded retired Colonel Doctor Kizza Besigye, as the party's flag-bearer against the ruling National Resistance Movement's candidate, General Yoweri Kaguta Museveni. Dr Besigye lost the contest, on each occasion. In 2017, Patrick Oboi Amuriat won the FDC presidency against the then-party president, retired Major General Gregory Mugisha Muntu, in hotly contested elections that were allegedly characterised by character assassination and verbal attacks to the person of General Muntu as well as insults, while the Muntu team remained calm and tried to unite the party. During that time, Ntale David Richard was an independent with no affiliation to any political party. In this election, Amuriat polled 641 votes against 463 votes for Muntu.

== Formation of ANT ==
The November 2017 election of Patrick Amuriat split the FDC into two camps, one that supported a confrontational and defiant approach to the regime led by Gen. Yoweri Museveni (supported by Amuriat) and the other that supported non-confrontational institutional approach (supported by Muntu). In September 2018, Mugisha Muntu and his supporters quit the FDC party to form a new party and were joined by independent-minded Ugandans like NTALE DAVID Richard. His main objective in the new party is to build grassroots party structures, encourage more members to run for parliamentary seats and in local elections as well as working in coalition with like minded opposition forces, namely People Power (Robert Kyagulanyi Ssentamu aka Bobi Wine), the Democratic Party (Norbert Mao) and JEEMA (Asuman Basalirwa) with the aim of putting forward a single joint candidate to compete in the 2021 presidential elections to oust the Museveni, who has been in power since the overthrow of the democratically elected President Milton Obote after a protracted Bush War that used child soldiers and killed hundreds of thousands of innocent Ugandan civilians. Later the same month, Muntu announced that he had begun the process of forming the new party, under the code name New Formation.

In March 2019, the Electoral Commission of Uganda, approved the political party, opening the way for gazetting and opening of offices in the future.

Ms Alice Alaso, a former member of Parliament for Serere District Women Constituency and former Vice President of FDC for the Eastern Region of Uganda, is one of the promoters of the new party.

It was officially launched at the Serena Kampala Hotel, in an event attended by Members of Parliament, heads of political parties, civil society organizations and the academia. Those present at the launch included Kyadondo East MP Robert Kyagulanyi Ssentamu, Democratic Party (DP) president Norbert Mao, Uganda People’s Congress (UPC) President Jimmy Akena, the Conservative Party’s Ken Lukyamuzi, former leaders of Opposition Winifred Kiiza and Prof Morris Ogenga Latigo, Arua Municipality MP Kassiano Wadri and Bugweri County MP Abdu Katuntu, among others.

The party unveiled its official symbol, a lighting bulb, its colours (white, purple, and orange) and a logo: a map of Uganda lit with a bulb in the middle.

On 7 July 2020, Jinja East MP Paul Mwiru and Ntungamo Municipality MP Gerald Karuhanga announced that they had crossed the floor and joined the Alliance for National Transformation. The two were unveiled by the principal and presidential aspirant, and party flag bearer for the 2021 presidential elections, Gen Mugisha Muntu.

== Election results ==
=== Presidential elections ===
Election	Party candidate	Votes	%	Result
2021	Mugisha Muntu	65,334	0.65%	Lost ✗
2026	Mugisha Muntu	59,276	0.53%	Lost ✗

=== Parliament of Uganda elections ===
Election	Party leader	Votes	%	Votes	%	Seats	+/–	Position	Government
Election	Party leader	Constituency		Women		Seats	+/–	Position	Government
2021	Mugisha Muntu	71,436	0.71%	82,318	0.81%	0 / 529	New	▲8th	Extra-parliamentary
2026	Mugisha Muntu	37,197	0.36%	1,434	0.01%	1 / 529	▲1	8th	Opposition
