= Abed Bwanika =

Ugandan politician

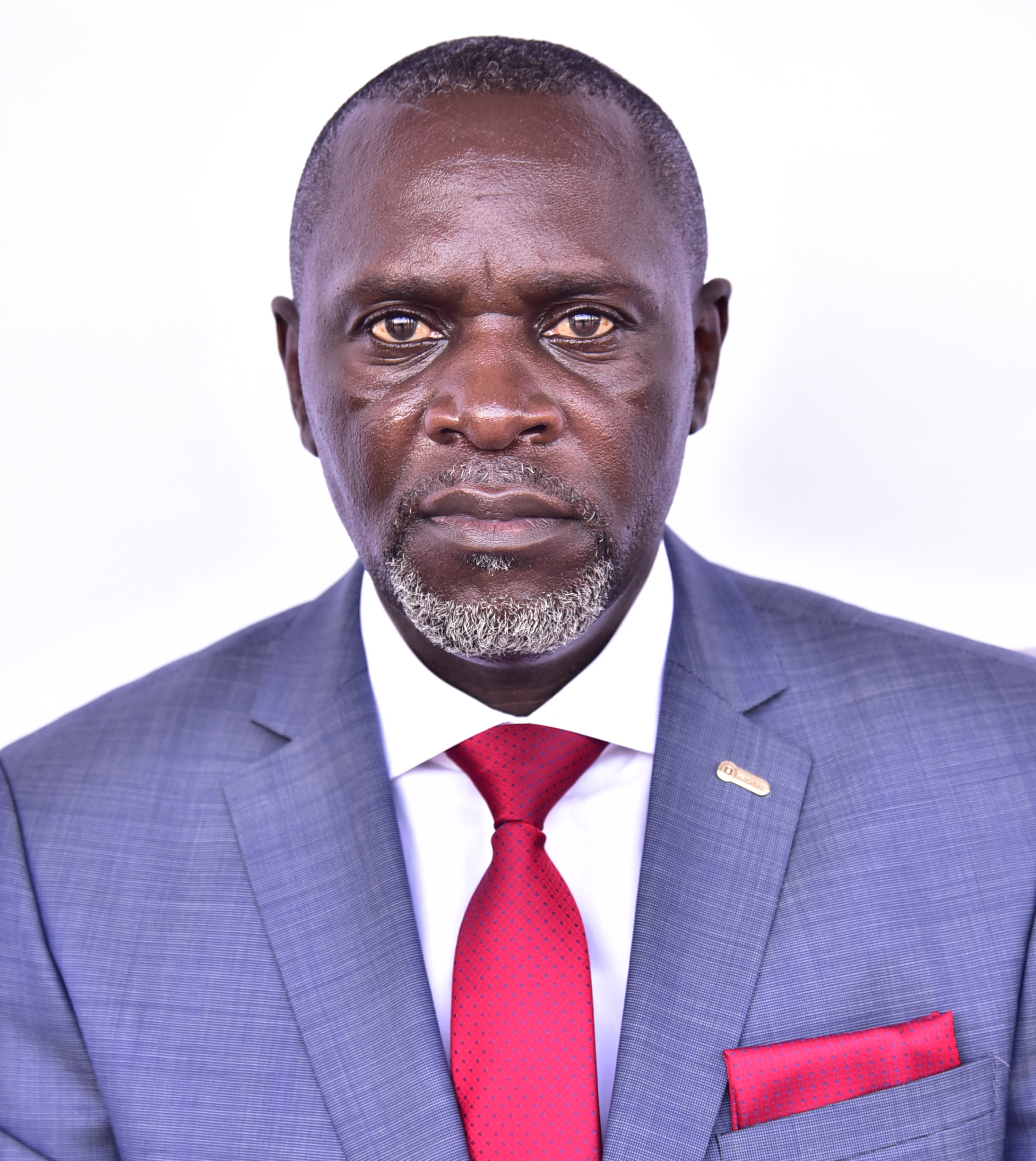
- Born: 1 August 1967 (age 59); Masaka District, Uganda Protectorate (now Lwengo District, Uganda)
- Citizenship: Uganda
- Education: Makerere University (Bachelor of Veterinary Medicine) (Master of Veterinary Science)
- Occupations: Veterinarian, politician, religious leader
- Years active: 1987–present
- Title: President; People's Development Party/DP Block
- Spouse: Gladys Namusuwe

Abed Bwanika (born 1 August 1967) is a Ugandan veterinarian, politician and pastor. He is also the President of the People's Development Party, an opposition political party in Uganda. Previously, he was a member of Parliament for Kimanya-Kabonera constituency in Masaka City (2021-2026) under the National Unity Platform, one of the newest political party, at that time, led by Robert Kyagulanyi Ssentamu.

== Early life and education ==
Bwanika was born on 1 August 1967 in modern-day Lwengo District. He attended Kimwanyi Primary School, near his parents' home in said area. Later, he studied at Masaka Secondary School for his 'O' level, and at Kigezi High School for his 'A' level. He was also admitted to Makerere University, where he graduated with a Bachelor of Veterinary Medicine degree. Later, he earned a Master of Science degree in the same field, also from Makerere.

== Career ==
=== Before politics ===
Following his first degree, Bwanika remained at Makerere as a graduate tutor, while he conducted research and pursued his second degree.

In 2001, he left teaching and started work as a private veterinary consultant.

He also opened the Christian Witness Church.

=== Politics ===
During the 1996 presidential elections, Bwanika supported Yoweri Museveni, but switched allegiance to Kizza Besigye in 2001. He ran as an independent candidate in the February 2006 presidential election, where he finished in fourth place, with 0.95 percent of the vote (65,874 total votes).

He again contested inthe 2011 presidential elections as the candidate of the People's Development Party, which he founded; he is also the party's president. The second time around, he received about 14,000 fewer votes (51,708 total votes), garnering 0.65 percent of the popular vote.

In August 2020, Bwanika left the People's Development Party to join the National Unity Platform. In the 2021 general election he was elected to Parliament to represent the Kimanya-Kabonera constituency in Masaka City. Prior to the 2026 general election, Bwanika exited the National Unity Platform and joined the newly formed Democratic Front. He contested on the same seat ( Kimanya -Kabonera ) constituency in the 2026 Uganda general election as Democratic Front flag bearer but lost to National Unity Platform's Patrick Kuteesa.

== Personal life ==
Bwanika is married to Gladys Namusuwe, a fish biologist and lecturer in the Department of Zoology at Makerere University. They have been married since 1995 and are the parents of four sons: Wise, Decent, Chosen, and Delight.

Preceded by None	President of the People's Development Party; 2010–present	Succeeded by Incumbent
