= 1961 Ugandan general election =

Elections in Uganda

General elections were held in Uganda on 23 March 1961. They were the first time direct elections to the Legislative Council had been held across the entire country. The result was a victory for the Democratic Party, which won 44 of the 82 seats (excluding Buganda).

== Results ==
Party	Votes	%	Seats	+/–
Uganda People's Congress	495,909	48.26	35	New
Democratic Party	436,420	42.47	44	+43
Uganda National Congress	40,134	3.91	1	−4
Other parties	9,115	0.89	0	0
Independents	45,946	4.47	2	−2
Total	1,027,524	100.00	82	+72
Registered voters/turnout	1,362,755	–		
Source: Nohlen et al.
