= Mike Kennedy Sebalu =

Ugandan politician

Mike Kennedy Sebalu is a Ugandan politician. He is a former Member of parliament in the National Assembly of Uganda (his constituency being Busiro East), a former member of the African Union's Pan-African Parliament and a member of the East African Community.

He is a public speaker and member of the Rotary. He is also the director of A-Plus Funeral Management.
