= Frank Bulira Kabinga =

Ugandan politician and 2026 presidential candidate

Presidential Candidate
- In office 2026 Uganda General Election

Personal details
- Born: 1982 (age 43–44) Kasubi, Rubaga Division, Uganda
- Party: Revolutionary People’s Party (RPP) formally part of Uganda Federal Democratic Organization (UFDO)
- Education: Kyambogo University
- Occupation: Politician, Former Secondary School Teacher
- Known for: Campaigning on federalism platform

Frank Bulira Kabinga (born in 1982) is a Ugandan teacher and politician who was the presidential candidate of the Revolutionary People’s Party (RPP) in the 2026 Uganda general election. He was officially nominated by the Electoral Commission of Uganda in September 2025 and campaigned on a platform that included support for federalism.

== Early life and education ==
Kabinga was born in 1982 in Kasubi, Rubaga Division, and raised in Luweero District. He completed his primary schooling at Kasubi Church of Uganda Primary in 1999, then attended Mengo Senior School and Old Kampala Secondary School for his O- and A-Level studies. He graduated from Kyambogo University in 2005 and worked as a secondary school teacher.

== Political career ==
Bulira’s early political involvement included work with the Uganda Federal Democratic Organization (UFDO), where he participated in youth mobilization and advocacy related to governance reform. He took over the leadership of UFDO after the death of Aggrey Kiyingi. Bulira later joined RPP and rose to national attention as the RPP’s flagbearer for the 2026 presidential contest. He is among the eight presidential candidates formally accepted by the Electoral Commission of Uganda during the nomination period in late September 2025.

== See also ==
- Politics of Uganda
- 2026 Ugandan general election
