= Uganda Patriotic Movement =

Defunct political party in Uganda

- Abbreviation: UPM
- Founder: Yoweri Museveni
- Founded: 1980
- Dissolved: 1986
- Split from: Uganda People's Congress
- Merged into: National Resistance Movement
- Ideology: Socialism; Maoism; Anti-Sovietism; Anti-Obotism
- Political position: Far-left

The Uganda Patriotic Movement (UPM) was a socialist political party in Uganda that played a crucial role in the country's political transition during the 1980s. Founded by Yoweri Museveni as a left-wing splinter group from the Uganda People's Congress (UPC), the UPM represented an alternative political vision that would eventually evolve into the National Resistance Movement.

== Formation and political context ==
The Uganda Patriotic Movement emerged from growing dissatisfaction within the Uganda People's Congress during the late 1970s and early 1980s. The party was founded as a response to what its leaders perceived as the UPC's failure to address Uganda's fundamental political and economic challenges following the overthrow of Idi Amin in 1979. It was a left-wing splinter group from the Uganda People's Congress (UPC). Yoweri Museveni, who would later become Uganda's long-serving president, established the UPM as a vehicle for his political ambitions and ideological vision.

The formation of the UPM reflected broader tensions within Uganda's political landscape during the transitional period following Amin's regime. The movement represented a left-wing alternative to the established political parties and advocated for socialist principles and revolutionary change in Uganda's political and economic systems.

== 1980 Elections and political participation ==
The Uganda Patriotic Movement participated in the December 1980 Ugandan general election, which were ultimately won by Milton Obote's Uganda People's Congress. The UPM's participation in these elections marked its attempt to achieve political change through democratic means, though the party's electoral performance was limited compared to the established political parties.

The 1980 elections were significant in Uganda's political history, as they represented the first attempt at democratic transition following the Amin dictatorship. The UPM's participation demonstrated its initial commitment to democratic processes, even as the party would later abandon electoral politics in favor of armed resistance.

== Transformation and legacy ==
Following the disputed 1980 elections, the Uganda Patriotic Movement evolved into the National Resistance Movement (NRM), which launched a guerrilla war against the Obote government through its military wing, the National Resistance Army (NRA). This transformation marked a fundamental shift from electoral politics to armed resistance, ultimately leading to the NRM's victory in 1986 and Museveni's rise to power.

The UPM's brief existence represents a crucial transitional period in Uganda's political development, bridging the gap between the post-Amin chaos and the eventual establishment of the NRM government. The party's socialist ideology and revolutionary approach to political change influenced the early policies and rhetoric of the NRM, even as the latter movement would eventually adopt more pragmatic and market-oriented approaches to governance. The UPM's legacy is thus intimately connected to the broader story of Uganda's political transformation under Museveni's leadership, which began with the formation of this now-defunct socialist party.

The UPM has never been withdrawn by the Uganda Electoral Commission. Despite being dormant with no political activity since 1984. the party still legally exists.
