= Kabaka Yekka =

Political party

- Abbreviation: KY
- President: Edward Mutesa
- Founder: Sepiriya Kisawuzi Masembe-Kabali
- Founded: 1961
- Banned: 1969
- Succeeded by: Conservative Party (de facto)
- Headquarters: Kampala
- Ideology: Monarchism; Baganda interests Bugandan autonomy
- Political position: Centre-right to Right-wing

Kabaka Yekka, commonly abbreviated as KY, was a monarchist political movement and party in Uganda. Kabaka Yekka means 'king only' in the Ganda language, Kabaka being the title of the King in the kingdom of Buganda.

== History ==
=== Formation ===
In 1960, Milton Obote helped to establish a political party in Uganda, known as the Uganda People's Congress (UPC). The UPC aimed to erode the power and influence of the "Mengo Establishment", a group of traditionalist Baganda that led the sub-national kingdom of Buganda. The Mengo Establishment was plagued by rivalries and infighting, but most of its members, as Protestant Christians, were united by their dislike of the Democratic Party (DP), which was dominated by Catholics.

The DP won a majority of the seats in the National Assembly in Uganda's first free national elections in 1961, and formed a government. The UPC and the traditionalist Baganda both disliked the Catholic orientation of the DP, but were diametrically opposed to each other's ideals. Despite this, the UPC sounded out a political alliance with the Baganda leaders and the Kabaka (King) of Buganda, Mutesa II. After several negotiations, the UPC and Baganda leaders held a conference whereupon an agreement was reached. Soon afterwards the Baganda created the Kabaka Yekka and joined an alliance with the UPC. Historian Ian Hancock attributes the formation of the KY to Sepiriya Kisawuzi Masembe-Kabali, with support from John Bakka, Latimer Mpagi and Antoni Tamale.

=== Electoral results and governing history ===
In 1962, Kabaka Yekka allied with Uganda People's Congress. In the Lukiko elections of 22 February 1962, it won 65 of the 68 seats, with a vote share of more than 90%. The Lukiko duly elected 21 KY members to the National Assembly. The UPC won a majority in the April 1962 general elections for the National Assembly, so Obote was tasked with forming a government. He became Prime Minister of a UPC-KY coalition government, with the KY holding mostly insignificant portfolios. Obote subsequently undermined the alliance with the KY by establishing UPC offices in Baganda in contravention of the inter-party agreement, and by encouraging KY members of the assembly to defect to his party through offers of patronage.

In 1964, a conservative in the UPC, Grace Ibingira, initiated a struggle to gain control of the party with the ultimate goal of deposing Obote. Meanwhile, Mutesa increasingly feared that the UPC would deny his kingdom its traditional autonomy and concluded that in order to retain power he would have to garner influence in national politics. He proceeded to instruct Baganda MPs to join the UPC with the goal of bolstering Ibingira's position and unseating Obote, thus allowing for a reorientation of the UPC-KY alliance that would be more favorable to Buganda. On 24 August, Obote, with the UPC having consolidated a majority in Parliament, declared that the coalition with KY was dissolved.

In 1969, Kabaka Yekka was banned along with all other opposition parties when Obote declared the UPC Uganda's only official party.

In 1980, Mayanja Nkangi founded the Conservative Party, which is considered to be a de facto successor of Kabaka Yekka.

== Ideology ==
Abu Mayanja, a leading spokesman for the KY-dominated government of Buganda, described how "we in Kabaka Yekka hold than only a government based on the institution of Kabakaship can be stable in Buganda... [we believe] that the first duty of government is to maintain and uphold the institution of monarchy as the foundation of order, security, unity and patriotism in Buganda".
