= Ken Lukyamuzi =

Ugandan lawyer and politician

John Ken Lukyamuzi
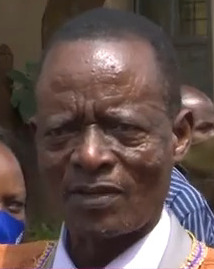
- Lukyamuzi in 2020
- Born: Uganda
- Citizenship: Uganda
- Education: Makerere University (Bachelor of Laws); Law Development Centre (Diploma in Legal Practice) (In progress)
- Occupations: Lawyer and politician
- Years active: 2001–present
- Known for: Politics
- Title: Party President of the Conservative Party of Uganda
- Spouse: Mary Gonzaga

John Ken Lukyamuzi, commonly known as Ken Lukyamuzi, is a Ugandan politician and lawyer, who is the leader of the Conservative Party of Uganda. He served in the 7th parliament (2001–2006) as the elected representative for Lubaga South (Rubaga South) Constituency. He represented the same constituency in the 9th parliament (2011–2016).

== Education ==
Ken Lukyamuzi was admitted to Makerere University's School of Law for the 2011/2012 academic year. After six years of study, which included several retakes, he was awarded a Bachelor of Laws degree in January 2019.

== Career ==
Ken Lukyamuzi represented Lubaga South Constituency in Uganda's Parliament from 2001 to 2006. However, in January 2006, he was expelled from Parliament for failing to declare his personal assets, as required by law. His daughter, Suzan Nampijja Lukyamuzi, was subsequently elected to replace him and served as the constituency's representative in the 8th Parliament (2006–2011).

Following his dismissal, Ken Lukyamuzi sued the Inspector General of Government (IGG) for wrongful removal from Parliament. The Uganda Supreme Court ruled in his favour, awarding him pay back and lifting the restriction that had barred him from contesting political office.

In the 9th Parliament (2011–2016), Lukyamuzi returned to politics and was re-elected to represent Lubaga South Constituency. During the 2016 election cycle, however, he lost the seat to incumbent MP, Kato Lubwama, an independent politician and comedian.

== Other considerations ==
Ken Lukyamuzi is a conservationist who is reported to have co-founded the Wildlife Club of Uganda, together with the late Ponsiano Semwezi and the late Professor Eric Edroma.
