= Patrick Amuriat =

Ugandan politician

Patrick Oboi Amuriat is a Ugandan engineer, politician and a founding member of Forum for Democratic Change (FDC) party and ran on its platform for the president of Uganda in the January 2021 presidential election. He served in the Ugandan parliament from 2001 to 2016 and chaired several committees and was a member of Parliamentary Advocacy Forum, PAFO.

== Early life, education and career ==
Amuriat was born in Soroti in eastern Uganda to Mzee John Amuriat and Elizabeth Aciro Amuriat. He had his early education in Soroti before proceeding to Makerere University where he obtained various certificates including a Diploma in Education, a Bachelor and a Masters Degrees in Engineering. He worked with different engineering firms before joining public service where he had a stint with Kumi District as a District Engineer.

== Political career ==
Amuriat became politically active in 1994 and had his first electoral contest in the Constituency Assembly (CA) elections of 1994. He was appointed Campaign Chief and official interpreter for Teso and Karamoja Sub Regions by opposition presidential candidate Paul Kawanga Ssemwogerere during the 1996 election. He was elected to the parliament in 2001 and chaired Science and Technology and Commissions Statutory Authorities and State Enterprises (COSASE) committees. He was a member of the Committee of Works and Transport until 2016 when he left the parliament. In 2015, FDC party appointed him Chief National Field Coordinator to its presidential flag bearer Kizza Besigye. Amuriat was elected FDC National President during its 7th National Delegates Conference on 24 November 2017 becoming the 3rd leader of the party. On 31 July 2025 he stepped down to allow Nandala Mafabi to be fronted by his party Forum For Democratic Change as the presidential aspirant in 2026 General Elections.

=== Presidential campaign ===
Amuriat declared his intention to run for the president of Uganda in August 2020, when he announced that he would start FDC's presidential nomination after the party failed to convince its former presidential candidate Kizza Besigye to run in the 2021 presidential poll. Amuriat won the party's presidential ticket contesting in the January 2021 presidential election. He received 337,589 (3.26) behind Yoweri Museveni 6,042,898 (58.38%) the winner of the election. Appearing before the Parliamentary Human Rights Committee investigating cases of electoral violence during the election, he complained of harassment and intimidation and reported that he was arrested more than 40 times during the two months campaign and had been punched in the stomach by a security officer. On 11 January, less than three days before the election, he was arrested by the police for traffic violation after his driver swerved off the road, drove through the bush and emerged on the road a few meters after a barricade mounted by the police to prevent them from going to campaign in Mpigi Town to the cheers of onlookers.

== See also ==
- Kiiza Besigye
