= Conservative Party (Uganda) =

Political party in Uganda

- Abbreviation: CP
- Leader: Ken Lukyamuzi
- Founded: 1966 (officially); 1979 or 1980 (de facto)
- Preceded by: Kabaka Yekka (de facto)
- Ideology: Conservatism; Federalism; Monarchism
- Political position: Centre-right
- National Assembly of Uganda: 0 / 529

Party flag

The Conservative Party (CP) is a centre-right political party in Uganda. It is led by Ken Lukyamuzi.

== History ==
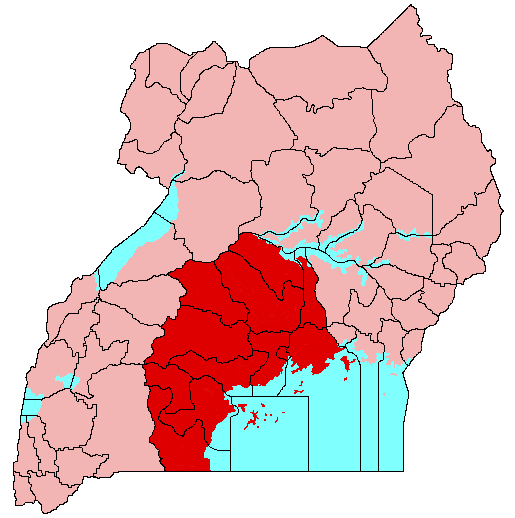
The CP aimed for the restoration of the subnational kingdom of Buganda (dark red) within Uganda; this was achieved in 1993.

The Conservative Party serves as de facto successor to Kabaka Yekka, a Baganda political party and movement that had been loyal to the Buganda monarchy and operated directly after Uganda's independence. Kabaka Yekka and the Buganda kingdom were forcibly disbanded during the Mengo Crisis of 1966. The prime minister (Katikkiro) for Buganda, Jehoash Mayanja Nkangi, consequently fled abroad. As former member of Kabaka Yekka's youth wing, Nkangi organized the Conservative Party in exile; thus, 1966 is regarded as the party's traditional foundation date. However, the party only became truly active from 1979 or 1980 onwards.

By the time of its foundation, the CP generally followed similar principles as Kabaka Yekka. Overall, its political aims were not well defined; it only called for the restoration of Uganda's 1962 constitution and the decentralization of political power in the country. The party was considered monarchist, as one of its main objective was to protect Uganda's traditional rulers. Regardless, it did not emphasize its connection to Baganda royalists.

The CP was one of the four parties to register for the 1980 Ugandan general election, but remained a minor force. It lacked funding, had no paramilitary wing like other Ugandan parties, and possessed no firm party organization. In fact, many Baganda monarchists preferred to join the Democratic Party (DP), as they believed that the Conservative Party could not win the election. While campaigning in 1980, the party claimed that its supporters were harassed by the Uganda People's Congress (UPC) and DP. The CP failed to win any seats during the 1980 election. In the next decades, the CP remained a marginal group, while Ugandan came under the control of a succession of authoritarian governments. Regardless, Nkangi became an influential figure and was appointed as minister by several Ugandan regimes. By the early 1990s, the CP increasingly voiced its support for Kabaka Yekka's traditional aims. In 1993, the long-held ambition by the monarchists to restore the Buganda kingdom was fulfilled. Nkangi played an important role in the restoration.

The CP was affected by factionalism during the early 2000s, with notable factions led by Nkangi, and Makindye West MP Nsubuga Nsambu respectively. Nkangi initially reconciled with the rest of the CP under secretary general Ken Lukyamuzi in July 2003, but was ousted from his position as president-general of the party in November of that year. Nsambu and Lukyamuzi claimed that Nkangi had become too close to the ruling government of Yoweri Museveni, and no longer followed the CP's ideology. Nsambu was consequently declared interim party president. Internal disputes continued until 2005, when Nkangi officially agreed to pass the leadership of the CP to Lukyamuzi.

In the general election of 23 February 2006, the party won 1 out of 289 elected seats.

The Conservative Party supported presidential candidate Kizza Besigye during the general election of 2016. CP president Lukyamuzi attended the foundation ceremony for the Alliance for National Transformation in 2019. The CP ran with two parliamentary candidates during the 2021 Ugandan general election, but failed to win any seats.

== Ideology ==
The Conservative Party is described as centre-right. The party places great importance in Ugandan traditions and customs, and is regarded as monarchist due to its support for the traditional rulers. It has proposed the decentralization and federalisation of Uganda, arguing that the country was formed as a union of different peoples. As these ideas have gradually become more popular in Uganda, other parties have adopted them as well, leaving the CP marginalized. The party has consequently begun to focus more on social justice, and presents itself as an advocate for the rural poor, against special privileges, and against corruption. It also supports the sustainable use of Uganda's forests and bodies of water, and has campaigned for the protection of the environment.
