= Mugisha Muntu =

Ugandan politician (born 1958)

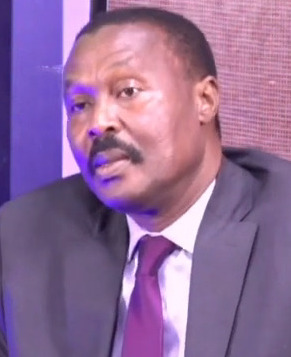
- Muntu in 2020
- Born: 7 October 1958 (age 68); Uganda
- Citizenship: Uganda
- Education: Makerere University (BA in Political Science)
- Occupations: Military officer, politician
- Years active: 1981–present
- Known for: Military, politics

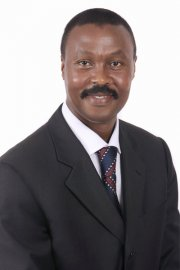
Mugisha Muntu

Gregory Mugisha Muntuyera, commonly referred to as Mugisha Muntu (born October 1958), is a Ugandan Politician and retired Military officer. He is the current president of the Alliance for National Transformation (ANT), a political party he founded in March 2019.

He previously served as the president of the Forum for Democratic Change (FDC), an opposition political party, from 2012 to 2017. In September 2018, General Muntu parted ways with the FDC citing ideological differences with the new FDC leadership of Patrick Oboi Amuriat. On 27 September 2018 he announced in a televised press conference that he and some other leaders had begun what he called the New Formation which later became the ANT.

He served as the Commander of the Army, the highest position in the Ugandan military, from 1989 to 1998. When the National Resistance Army was renamed the Uganda People's Defence Forces (UPDF), General Muntu became Commander of the UPDF.

In 2008, he unsuccessfully contested for the FDC's presidency, against Kizza Besigye, but was later elected as the party's president in 2012.

== 2026 Presidential election ==
In July 2025, Muntu was endorsed by the Alliance for National Transformation (ANT) to contest for the presidency. He was officially nominated by the Electoral Commission on September 24, 2025. During his campaign trail, he focused heavily on increasing household incomes, improving agricultural infrastructure, and combating corruption. Following the January 15, 2026 election, the Electoral Commission declared that Muntu placed fourth with 0.53% of the total vote. Muntu subsequently criticized the management of the election, labeling the polling process deeply flawed, but noted that the party would not legally contest the results in court.

== Early life and education ==
Mugisha Muntu was born in October 1958 at Kitunga village in present-day Ntungamo District, Ankole sub-region, Western Uganda, to Enock Ruzima Muntuyera and Aida Matama Muntuyera. He had an affluent childhood as his father was a strong government functionary and close friend of Ugandan leader Milton Obote. He attended Mbarara Junior School, Kitunga Primary School and Kitunga High School. (Kitunga High School was later renamed Muntuyera High School, in memory of his father, by Obote.) Muntu attended Makerere College School and subsequently went on to graduate in political science from Makerere University, where he was deputy president of the students' union.

== Military career ==
Muntu joined the guerrilla National Resistance Army of Yoweri Museveni the day he completed his university exams, to the chagrin of his family and President Obote, who considered him a son. Early into the rebellion he was shot in the chest but survived after receiving treatment in Kampala. Later he emerged as the head of Military Intelligence after the NRA victory in 1986. In military intelligence he had under his command personalities like Paul Kagame, who would later become the President of Rwanda.

Muntu underwent further elite military training in Russia before becoming a division commander in Northern Uganda. He rose to the rank of Major General within the UPDF. His rapid promotion did not to go unnoticed by other senior officers in the Ugandan military. He was later to serve as Commander of the UPDF. That post was later renamed Chief of Defence Forces of Uganda. As army chief, he oversaw the demobilization of many sections of the army. Observers have attributed Maj. Gen. Muntu's quick ascension to the pinnacle of the NRA/UPDF to his reputation as an incorruptible and loyal officer to the President of Uganda. This loyalty was rewarded by the support of the President during Muntu's many quarrels with sections of the army which accused him of trying to alienate them. Prominent among these were the so-called 'uneducated' officers, led by Major General James Kazini. Muntu was accused of creating a schism within the army by showing preferential treatment to educated officers while sidelining those he considered uneducated.

== Political career ==
Muntu was a member of the constituent assembly (1994–1995) and parliamentarian. After disagreeing with Museveni's approach to politics and the military, he was removed from the army command and appointed as a minister, a position he politely turned down. In November 2001, he was selected by the members of the Ugandan Parliament to serve as one of the nine Ugandan representatives to the East African Legislative Assembly (EALA).

On 21 November 2020, Muntu, along with fellow opposition presidential candidates Bobi Wine, Henry Tumukunde, Norbert Mao, and Patrick Amuriat Oboi, agreed to form an alliance together.

On 24 September 2025, Muntu was nominated by the Electoral Commission of Uganda on the Alliance for National Transformation (ANT) party ticket for Presidency in the 2026 general elections.

== Personal life ==
Since 1992, he has been married to Julia Kakonge Muntu. They have two children.

Military offices
Preceded by Salim Saleh; As Commander of the NRA	Commander of Uganda People's Defence Force; 1989–1998	Succeeded by Jeje Odongo
