= Nandala Mafabi =

Ugandan accountant, lawyer, and politician

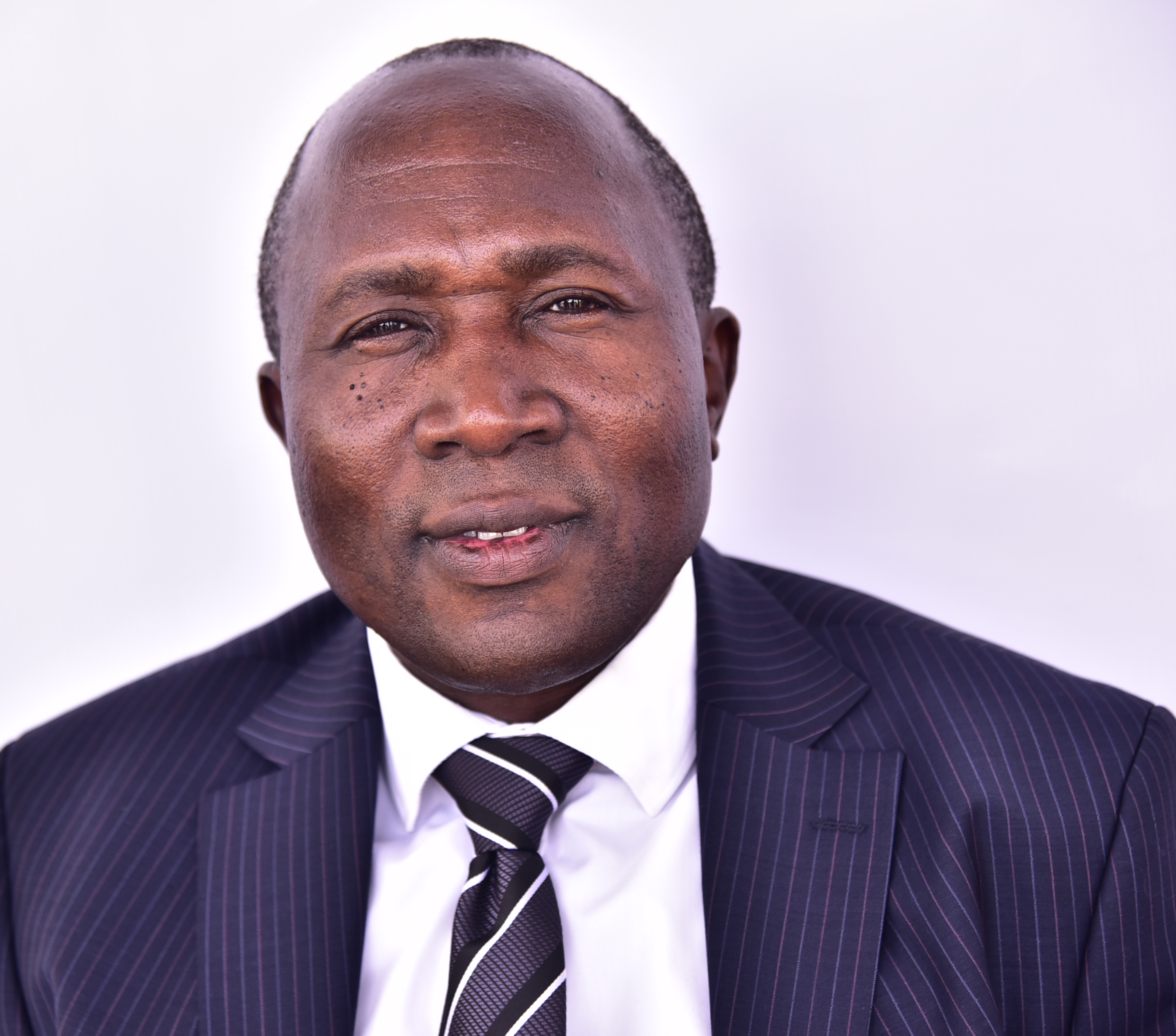
- Born: 17 January 1966 (age 60); Busamaga, Uganda
- Citizenship: Uganda
- Education: Makerere University (Bachelor of Laws) (Master of Arts in Economic Policy & Planning) (Bachelor of Statistics & Economics) (Diploma in Education); Law Development Centre (Postgraduate Diploma in Legal Practice); Uganda Management Institute (Diploma in Income Tax Administration)
- Occupations: Accountant, lawyer, politician
- Years active: 1983–present
- Title: Member of Parliament, Budadiri County West; Sironko District
- Spouse: Florence Mafabi

Nathan James Nandala Mafabi (born 17 January 1966) is a Ugandan accountant, lawyer, politician and legislator who represents Budadiri West County in Sironko District in the Ugandan parliament. From May 2011 until January 2014, he was the leader of the opposition in parliament.

== Early life and education ==
Nandala was born in Busamaga Village, Sironko District on 17 January 1966.

After attending local primary schools, he transferred to Mbale secondary school for his O-Level studies.

For his A-level education, he attended Busoga College Mwiri in Jinja District. He graduated from Makerere University in 1988 with a Bachelor of Statistics and Economics degree. He followed that with a postgraduate diploma in Education in 1989, also from Makerere. In 1993, he obtained a Diploma in Income Tax Administration from the Uganda Management Institute in Kampala.

In 1993, he passed the certified public accountant examinations in both Kenya and Uganda. In 1995, he was admitted to the Association of Chartered Certified Accountants as a fellow of the Association of Chartered Certified Accountants.

In 1997, he went back to Makerere University, graduating in 2000 with a Master of Arts in Economics followed by a Bachelor of Laws in 2006.

== Career ==
In 1988, Mafabi was hired as a tax assessor with the Uganda Revenue Authority (URA), serving in that capacity until 1993. From 1993 to 1994, he worked as a revenue officer. He was promoted to senior revenue officer in 1995, working in that capacity until 1996. He worked as a principal revenue officer at URA in 1997. From 1998 until 2000, he worked as the senior principal revenue officer and acting chief internal auditor at URA. From 2000 to 2001, he worked as a financial management consultant in the private sector.

In 2001, he entered Uganda's elective politics by contesting the Budadiri County West parliamentary constituency. He won and was re-elected in 2011. From 2006 until 2011, Mafabi served as the chairman of the Public Accounts Committee in the parliament. From 2001 until 2006, he served as the chairman of the Parliamentary Committee on the Economy. Since 2008, he has served as the chairman of the Bugisu Cooperative Union. From 2011 until 2020, he served as the leader of the opposition.

Mafabi is also the vice-chair of The Parliamentary Network on the World Bank & International Monetary Fund.

On September 24, 2025, under the Forum for Democratic Change (FDC), Mafabi was nominated to contest for the presidency in 2026 elections by the Electoral Commission of Uganda. In the 2026 Ugandan general elections, he received 1.88% of the vote; the election was won by Yoweri Museveni.

Mafabi rejected the 2026 January presidential election results, describing the process as fraudulent and calling for the immediate resignation of Justice Simon Byabakama, the chairperson of the Electoral Commission of Uganda.

== Personal life ==
Mafabi is married.

He is of the Protestant faith.

He belongs to the Forum for Democratic Change political party.

== See also ==
- Cabinet of Uganda
