= Uganda People's Congress =

Political party in Uganda

Uganda People's Congress Congress ya Watu wa Uganda
- Leader: Jimmy Micheal Akena
- Founder: Milton Obote
- Founded: 1960
- Split from: Uganda National Congress
- Headquarters: Kampala
- Ideology: Social democracy African nationalism Pan-Africanism; Historical; Now Factions: Obotism; African socialism
- Political position: Centre-left to left-wing
- National Assembly of Uganda: 9 / 529

Party flag

Website
- https://www.upcparty.net/

The Uganda People's Congress (UPC; Swahili: Congress ya Watu wa Uganda) is a political party in Uganda.

UPC was founded in 1960 by Milton Obote, who led the country to independence alongside UPC member of parliament A.G. Mehta. Obote later served two presidential terms under the party's banner. Obote was still the party head when he died in October 2005, although he had previously announced his intention to step down.

The party won nine out of 289 elected seats in the 2006 general election. In the presidential election of the same date, UPC candidate Miria Obote, the former first lady, won 0.8 percent of the vote.

On 14 May 2010, the party elected Olara Otunnu, a former United Nations undersecretary-general for children and armed conflict, to lead the party. He replaced Obote's widow Miria.

== Background ==
The UPC dominated Ugandan politics from independence until 1971, when Milton Obote was overthrown by Idi Amin. The party returned to power under Obote in 1980 until he was overthrown again in 1985 by Tito Okello. The history of the UPC is intertwined with the ethnic divide that has plagued Uganda since it was a British protectorate.

== Pre-Independence ==
Flag of the UPC until 1966, on which the national flag of Uganda is based

As independence approached in the 1940s–1950s, it was clear that the Baganda (the largest ethnic group) wanted extensive autonomy in Uganda, and the Buganda King's party Kabaka Yekka ("The King Only") emphasised this desire. However, this was not favoured by most Ugandans of other tribes and some Buganda educated elite who formed an alternative party, the Democratic Party, to aspire for national unity. Although unpopular in Buganda, the Democratic Party had widespread support in the rest of the Bantu-speaking South.

In this void emerged an alternative – the Uganda National Congress (UNC). Although led by a northerner (Milton Obote), the UNC appeared more modernist and accommodating and attracted many southerners particularly in the east. The UNC formed an alliance with Uganda People's Union (UPU) and emerged as the UPC. The three parties (Kabaka Yekka, UPC, and the Democratic Party) contested the first pre-independence election.

As expected, Kabaka Yekka won most of the seats in Buganda and the UPC won most seats in the north and east. However, the Democratic Party (DP) led by Benedicto Kiwanuka emerged as the largest single party. Kiwanuka was on the verge of becoming the first prime minister of independent Uganda when he was thwarted by a surprising alliance between the UPC and Kabaka Yekka.

The Kabaka was afraid that DP would remove the monarchy in favour of a more modern-looking Uganda. As for the UPC, Milton Obote, realising he had lost the election, saw the alliance as the way to power. In return, Obote offered the Kabaka a ceremonial role in the new administration and the retention of all royal powers. The UPC/KY alliance thus formed Uganda's first government with Milton Obote as prime minister.

== Ugandan Constitutional Conference ==
The UPC, represented by President Milton Obote and Member of Parliament A.G. Mehta, led negotiations with the British Government to pave the way for Ugandan independence at the Ugandan Constitutional Conference, held at Lancaster House in 1961.

== First government ==
The alliance between the UPC and Kabaka Yekka did not last long. After four years in power, Milton Obote ordered a military attack on the Kabaka's palace in 1966. John Mikloth Magoola Luwuliza-Kirunda came in as organizing secretary in 1966. The attack was led by then–army officer Idi Amin. The Kabaka escaped to London and Obote declared himself President of Uganda. This action more than anything else began the decline of the UPC as a popular party in Uganda. As his unpopularity grew Obote increasingly turned to his Northern home support rather than trying to strengthen the party in the South. The 1969 elections were cancelled and Obote became dictatorial. His government was overthrown in a coup d'état in 1971 by Idi Amin.

== Return to power ==
The UPC returned in 1979 after Idi Amin was overthrown. Obote as leader of the UPC was closely aligned to the Military Junta that had replaced Idi Amin and rather than strengthen the support of the party in the South of Uganda took up a more military approach. The army (traditionally dominated by Northerners) was a brutal machine that carried out numerous atrocities particularly in the South. This polarised the north–south divide with the UPC being perceived more as a Northern party than ever before. Southerners turned to the Democratic Party and a smaller party called the Uganda Patriotic Movement (UPM) led by a former UPC member, Yoweri Museveni.

In the elections of 1980, there was overwhelming suspicion that the UPC had rigged the result with the help of the Military Junta. This perception was further enhanced when Obote appointed the head of the Military Junta, Paulo Muwanga as his vice president when the UPC was declared the winner of the elections. A civil war broke out in Uganda when Yoweri Museveni rejected the result and went to the bush to fight the government.

Yoweri Museveni's eventual success was due to the north–south divide that the UPC had helped foster in Uganda. Southerners more than ever before realised that they had to take up arms to protect their rights. In the past most Southerners had despised military careers. When Museveni came to power in 1986, his army was dominated by Southerners particularly from the west.

== 2006 election ==
On 28 November 2005, Obote's widow Miria was elected party president. Miria Obote was UPC's presidential candidate in the 2006 general election.

The UPC returned to contest the election in 2006, when Museveni restored multi-party elections; however, Obote died in exile a few months before. The UPC's traditional heartland in the North appeared uninterested in the UPC without Obote, but still opposed Museveni. This time they turned to Museveni's main opponent Kizza Besyigye (from the South) who led the Forum for Democratic Change (FDC).

The UPC had failed even to capitalise on its self-created dilemma (appearing to be a Northern party) by not appointing a popular Northern politician to lead the party – instead they opted for Obote's widow (Miria), a Southerner. After the elections, the party suffered many high-level defections to Museveni's ruling National Resistance Movement and to the FDC. Miria's election is a source of resentment, and many Ugandans still associate the party with the military excesses of the past. In the 23 February 2006 parliamentary election, the party won nine out of 319 seats in the National Assembly.

== New leader ==
The UPC's poor performance in the 2006 elections forced the party to review its place in Ugandan politics. Uganda's political landscape is changing from regional based parties to personality driven politics. The party needed to find a leader with a recognised calibre in politics. The party chose Dr. Olara Otunnu, a former UN undersecretary general for children and armed conflict. The election however revealed internal conflicts in the party that are likely to affect its performance at the 2011 elections. Otunnu served under Tito Okello as Foreign Minister and is seen by some as part of the putsch that overthrew the last UPC government in 1985.

Otunnu's main rival at the party elections was Milton Obote's son Jimmy Akena, the Member of Parliament for Lira Municipality showing the Obote family still cherishes the party that Obote created.

Otunnu was later voted out by the UPC fraternity led by Canon Andrew Nyote who was the UPC chairperson at that time. This election led to the rise of Jimmy Akena, son of the founding father of UPC. Akena became President of the Uganda People's Congress on 2 July 2015.

== Election results ==
=== Presidential elections ===
Election	Party candidate	Votes	%	Result
2006	Miria Obote	577,356	0.82%	Lost ✗
2011	Olara Otunnu	125,059	1.58%	Lost ✗
2016	Did not run			
2021	Did not run			

=== Parliament of Uganda elections ===
Election	Votes	%	Votes	%	Seats	+/–	Position
Election	Constituency		Women		Seats	+/–	Position
1961	495,909	48.3%	—N/a		35 / 82	New	▲1st
1962	545,324	51.8%	—N/a		37 / 82	▲2	1st
1980	1,963,679	47.1%	—N/a		75 / 126	▲38	1st
2006					9 / 319	▼66	▼3rd
2011	265,568	3.37%	237,477	3.22%	10 / 375	▲1	▼4th
2016	172,781	2.14%	236,164	3.24%	6 / 426	▼4	4th
2021	180,313	1.80%	229,884	2.26%	9 / 529	▲3	▼5th
2026	250,864	2.41%	301,721	3.00%	12 / 529	▲3	▲3rd

== See also ==
- Milton Obote
