= Justice Forum =

Political party in Uganda

- Abbreviation: JEEMA
- Leader: Asuman Basalirwa
- Founded: 1995 (as a pressure group); 28 March 2004 (as a political party)
- Registered: 23 March 2005
- Ideology: Constitutionalism; Social conservatism Reformism; Anti-LGBT
- Parliament of Uganda: 1 / 529

Website
- https://jeemauganda.org/

The Justice Forum (commonly referred to as JEEMA (Note: Claimed to be an acronym of Justice for all, Education for all, Economic revitalization, Morality, African unity.)) is a political party in Uganda. The party was originally established as a pressure group in 1995 under the one-party system of the National Resistance Movement, as other political parties were not allowed until after the 2005 constitutional referendum. JEEMA has been participating in Uganda’s electoral politics and has fielded candidates at the presidential, parliamentary and local council levels since 1996. In 1996 and 2001, Kibirige Muhamad Mayanja, the first JEEMA party leader, contested for the Presidency of Uganda, and since then, the party has been represented in Uganda’s National Assembly. Currently, it is one of the five parties with representation in the 10th parliament and local governments. JEEMA’s first National Delegates Conference was held on 28 March 2004 at Kolping Hotel in Mityana, which saw the coming into force of the first party constitution, and the party was formally registered on 23 March 2005 after the referendum that re-instated a multi-party system in Uganda.

Kibirige Muhamad Mayanja, who led the party from its inception in 1995, relinquished power to 33-year-old lawyer Asuman Basalirwa in 2010 at the party’s second Delegates Conference that was held at Tal Cottages in Rubaga.

JEEMA places significant importance on civil rights and justice, as well as constitutionalism, and the party tends to be the most popular among the country's minority Muslim population.

== Ideology ==
JEEMA defines itself as a "social justice and welfare party," and declines to label itself as capitalist, communist, or socialist.

JEEMA is in favour of free essential social services (like health and education) to all citizens, market regulation, and grassroots consultation.

The party supports a transition to proportional representation and the Westminster system at the national level, saying that Uganda has never had an election that has not been disputed by other parties and that the first-past-the-post voting system promotes more focus on an individual's personal beliefs rather than that of their constituents, which is claimed to be a cause of corruption.

The party supports criminalising homosexuality. The party's only MP put forward a bill in March 2023 calling for the punishment of 10 years imprisonment for aggravated homosexuality.
