= Forum for Democratic Change =

Political party in Uganda

Forum for Democratic Change Jukwaa la Mabadiliko ya Kidemokrasia
- Leader: Patrick Oboi Amuriat
- Secretary: Nathan Nandala Mafabi
- Founded: 2004
- Ideology: Liberal democracy Liberal conservatism Secularism
- Political position: Centre-right
- Regional affiliation: Democrat Union of Africa
- International affiliation: International Democracy Union
- National Assembly of Uganda: 32 / 529

Website
- fdc.ug

The Forum for Democratic Change (Swahili: Jukwaa la Mabadiliko ya Kidemokrasia; FDC), founded on 16 December 2004, is one of the main opposition parties in Uganda. The FDC was founded as an umbrella body called Reform Agenda, mostly for disenchanted former members and followers of President Yoweri Museveni's National Resistance Movement (NRM). Party president Kizza Besigye, formerly a close ally of Museveni, was a candidate in 2001, 2006, 2011 and 2016 presidential elections. In November 2012, Mugisha Muntu was elected as President of the FDC until November 2017 when he was defeated by Patrick Oboi Amuriat the current party President until 2022.

FDC has been one of the greatest challengers to the NRM Party in the 2006, 2011, and 2016 presidential and parliamentary elections. Besigye was the party's presidential candidate, taking 37 per cent of the vote against Museveni's 59 per cent. Besigye alleged fraud and rejected the result.

In the general election of 23 February 2006, the party won 37 out of 289 elected seats. In the presidential election on the same date, Besigye won 37.4 per cent of the vote. In the 2011 election, the party performed worse with Besigye getting 26.01 per cent of the vote and the party winning 34 seats.

== Background ==
The origins of the FDC are intertwined with the history of the ruling NRM led by President Museveni. The NRM through its military wing the National Resistance Army (NRA) fought a successful guerrilla war against the governments of Milton Obote and Tito Okello and came to power in Uganda in 1986. During the guerrilla war, Museveni successfully moulded various interest groups into an effective military machine, and on achieving power, he began to build the NRM into a cohesive political organisation. The transition process and the NRM's desire to broaden its political base revealed other interests within the party and a feeling amongst some senior members of being sidelined.

Museveni had relied heavily on the support of the Tutsi refugees and their descendants who had been forced out of Rwanda by the Hutu majority in the 1960s. During the guerrilla war, the NRA had moved from the central district of Luwero to the west of the country where most of the Tutsis had been recruited. On achieving power, Tutsis like Paul Kagame and Fred Gisa Rwigyema were rewarded with powerful positions within the army and government.

The NRA advance on Kampala was very rapid, and during this process, hundreds of new recruits were incorporated into the NRA. Many of these came from Museveni's own tribe, the Banyankole, and other western tribes like the Batoro. When the NRA advanced back into Buganda through the town of Masaka, their ranks were expanded by Baganda, many who travelled from different parts of Buganda to join the guerrillas. For many of these, the common goal was simply to oust the northern-dominated government. There were also those who saw the opportunity to use the NRA to achieve Buganda's ambitions of autonomy.

== Splits within the NRM ==
Another important development was the NRA recruitment of younger impressionable soldiers who often held Museveni in awe. This did not often go down well with the more senior NRA officers:

"He was also clever that he recruited very young and inexperienced people; the kind that would obey him. Many of them were either coming from university or those who had not even been to school".

The younger educated cadres began to gain more influence in the NRM. Many had only joined the war towards its conclusion or had joined as NRM cadres after the war. This rivalry was often vocal and acrimonious:

"Many people have intimidated us, calling us (young people) creepers and sycophants of Museveni".

The young cadres and the Tutsi refugees formed the new power base of the NRM, and the party increasingly appeared tribal. Ugandan politics has been plagued by tribalism, and the young cadres with their new influence often encouraged the appointment of their relatives into key government positions. Most of these cadres were from the south-west of Uganda like Museveni.

This power base was suddenly weakened when the Tutsi refugees led by Fred Rwigema decided to return to Rwanda to fight the government (Habyarimana). The loss of so many key military and political advisers particularly in the intelligence services left Museveni vulnerable. The NRM realised it had to broaden its appeal, first by appeasing the Baganda (Uganda's largest ethnic group) by restoring their king the Kabaka, and recruiting more people from other tribes into the armed forces. The NRM also emphasised its role in restoring law and order to the country and continuously evoked the fear amongst the southern tribes that the brutal northern armies of Obote and Idi Amin could return if the NRM failed. This fear was facilitated by the war in the north waged by the Lords Resistance Army. The NRM also presided over rapid economic growth in the south of Uganda.

With this new confidence, Museveni began to act against those challenging his authority in the NRM. Many of these were the original members of the NRM/NRA, including the army commander Major General Mugisha Muntu and other once powerful NRM leaders. Many of these leaders opted for quiet retirement in their home districts, but others, like Mugisha Muntu and the former NRM spokesperson Winnie Byanyima, began openly criticising Museveni. There appeared, however, to have been little enthusiasm to completely break with the NRM, rather to encourage change from within.

This changed in the elections in 2001 when retired NRA officer Besigye challenged Museveni for the presidency. Besigye was relatively unknown outside the NRM/NRA establishment, but his courage in standing for election attracted support.

== Formation of the Forum for Democratic Change ==
The FDC was formally established in 2004. Besigye had gone into exile in the United States and then South Africa. The genesis of the party, however, was in Uganda where many disgruntled NRM members were actively promoting the establishment of a political organisation to challenge Museveni. This desire was further cemented when Museveni amended the constitution to allow him to stand for a third presidential term. This had angered many NRM veterans who had remained in the NRM waiting to take over when Museveni stood down. The amendment was criticised by some of Museveni's closest allies, like Eriya Kategaya who at the time was seen by many as the number two in the NRM/NRA political hierarchy. This opposition, however, did not bother Museveni who had by now firmly established himself in the NRM.

The FDC benefited from this disquiet, and when Besigye returned to Uganda, he found the FDC had considerable support even within the ranks of the NRM. This factor prompted Museveni to arrest Besigye. Although it was doubtful that Besigye could win an election against Museveni, the fact that he was attracting support from the NRA (now renamed the Uganda People's Defence Force) members brought the spectre of a split in the army. The FDC had many ex-NRA commanders in its ranks, including the former army commander Mugisha Muntu. Another factor was that many of these politicians were from the same region of Uganda as Museveni and, therefore, they could attract support from the president's own backyard.

Besigye's arrest was a political blunder that served to increase the popularity of the FDC. But the party now began to suffer from its success. Many of the prominent ex-NRM members were reluctant to publicly criticise Museveni. Politicians like Eriya Kategaya, who was now in the FDC leadership, were tentative in their approach. A further hindrance was that the government placed enormous restrictions on Besigye's ability to mount a national campaign. The FDC was extremely popular in urban areas like the capital city, Kampala, but with limited campaign time, he could not effectively campaign in rural areas where 70 percent of the population live. The NRM, on the other hand, spent enormous energy campaigning in rural areas and small towns.

The FDC and Besigye were also popular in the north where the population has suffered almost two decades of war between the government and the Lord's Resistance Army. This was despite the fact that the FDC hardly campaigned in this area. This is a reflection of the grievances felt by northern Ugandans who often felt abandoned by the government in Kampala.

Despite these obstacles, the FDC won over 30 percent of the vote, a major achievement for a party that was hardly a year old. The party eclipsed the traditional opposition parties like the Uganda People's Congress and the Democratic Party.

== Stagnation ==
In 2011, the FDC once again led the opposition to Museveni and the NRM in the presidential and parliamentary elections. The party once again failed to overturn Museveni's popularity. The FDC did worse than in 2006. Since the 2011 election, the party has been central in organising street demonstrations - some which have resulted in violent confrontations with the police.

== Formation of People's Government ==
After the 2016 general election, the FDC flag bearer, Dr. Kizza Besigye, contested Electoral Commission results. This was after he was under house arrest for three months he went ahead to swear himself in as the Ugandan People's President in a secret location. He went ahead to create what came to be known as a People's Government with a full cabinet and district leaders. Kampala Lord Mayor Elias Lukwago was appointed Vice President, and a big number of opposition politicians were appointed and currently serve in the People's Government.

== Election results ==
=== Presidential elections ===
Election	Party candidate	Votes	%	Result
2006	Kizza Besigye	2,592,954	37.39%	Lost ✗
2011	Kizza Besigye	2,064,963	26.01%	Lost ✗
2016	Kizza Besigye	3,508,687	35.61%	Lost ✗
2021	Patrick Oboi Amuriat	323,536	3.24%	Lost ✗
2026	Nandala Mafabi	209,039	1.88%	Lost ✗

=== Parliament of Uganda elections ===
Election	Party leader	Votes	%	Votes	%	Seats	+/–	Position	Government
Election	Party leader	Constituency		Women		Seats	+/–	Position	Government
2006	Kizza Besigye					37 / 319	▲37	▲2nd	Opposition
2011	Kizza Besigye	1,070,109	13.56%	1,242,218	16.84%	34 / 375	▼3	2nd	Opposition
2016	Kizza Besigye	1,027,648	12.73%	929,680	12.76%	36 / 426	▲2	2nd	Opposition
2021	Patrick Oboi Amuriat	729,347	7.30%	674,154	6,64%	32 / 529	▼4	▼3rd	Opposition
2026	Patrick Oboi Amuriat	245,988	2.36%	255,848	2.54%	9 / 529	▼23	▼4th	Opposition

== Notes ==
1. Comments by former NRA Major RUBARAMIRA RURANGA, The Weekly Observer August 2005().
2. FRANK TUMWEBAZE, Former Head of the Political Research Directorate in the Office of the President, The Weekly Observer December 2005 ().
3. Bidandi Ssali, The East African March 1999 ().
