= Democratic Party (Uganda) =

Political party in Uganda

Democratic Party Chama cha Kidemokrasia
- Leader: Norbert Mao
- Founded: 1954
- Ideology: Christian democracy Social conservatism
- Political position: Centre-right
- Regional affiliation: Democrat Union of Africa
- National Assembly of Uganda: 9 / 529

Party flag

The Democratic Party (Swahili: Chama cha Kidemokrasia; DP) is a moderate conservative political party in Uganda led by Norbert Mao. The DP was led by Paul Ssemogerere for 25 years until his retirement in November 2005. John Ssebaana Kizito replaced Ssemogerere, and led the party until February 2010, when Norbert Mao was elected party president.

In the general election of 18 February 2011, the party won 11 out of 238 elected seats. In the presidential election of the same date, Mao won 1.86% of the vote. As of June 2013, the party had fifteen seats in the parliament.

== Background ==
The DP was formed out of the religious and economic demographics that began to model politics in Buganda before Uganda's independence. Buganda is Uganda's largest ethnic region and has influenced the country's politics since the country was drawn up by the British colonial power. Buganda, like most parts of Africa before independence, had been visited by three key religious forces - the Roman Catholics, the Church of England (Protestant Christians), and Islam. All three battled each other to extend their influence in Buganda and Uganda as a whole. In Buganda, all three built powerful indigenous alliances and tried to influence the Buganda King - the Kabaka. By the 1950s, the Protestants had achieved the most influence over the Kabaka.

== Buganda ==
Another important factor influencing Buganda politics at the time was what the role of the Kabaka should be in an independent Uganda. A significant majority in Buganda wanted autonomy with the Kabaka as the symbol of Bugandan self-determination. Most other people in Uganda, however, wanted a unitary modern state unhindered by traditional royalty. This aspiration was shared by some of the Buganda elite, particularly those who belonged to the Catholic Church. They formed the basis of what was to become the DP.

To the Kabaka, DP members were seen as disloyal, and, in response, the Kabaka formed an alternative more popular party in Buganda called Kabaka Yekka ("The King Only"). Realising they had little chance of winning support in Buganda, the DP under Benedicto Kiwanuka began to campaign for the support of other southern Bantu-speaking tribes in southern Uganda. The DP effectively became Uganda's first national political party.

== Independence ==
"A third political force emerged from the Nilotic/Luo speaking North of Uganda." This statement is factually wrong. The UNC was formed in 1952. It was not led by any Nilotic. It was led by Ignatius Musazi who was a Muganda.

The two parties represented grievances of different identities. DP represented the grievances of Catholics who had been discriminated against since the battle of Mengo of 1892. The UPC, on the other hand, represented the grievances of the non-Baganda who had been dominated by Baganda since 1600.

The Uganda National Congress, later to become the Uganda People's Congress (UPC), was led by Milton Obote. Like the Democratic Party, the UPC campaigned for a unitary modern state. There are those who maintain there was very little difference in policy between the DP and UPC.

The first election in Uganda prior to Independence saw the Democratic Party as the largest party, however the UPC formed an alliance of convenience with the Kabaka Yekka and Milton Obote became Prime Minister, promising to preserve the Kabaka's status in Buganda. That alliance did not last and in 1966, Obote ordered the military against the Kabaka who fled into exile. The Kabaka Yekka party was banned and Benedicto Kiwanuka was imprisoned.

== New political forces ==
When Obote was overthrown in 1971 by Idi Amin, Benedicto Kiwanuka accepted a ministerial post in the new government. He was eventually murdered by Amin's agents. All political parties were banned in Uganda during Amin's rule.

The DP emerged again after Idi Amin was overthrown in 1979. The absence of the Kabaka Yekka party now made the DP the main political force in Buganda and southern Uganda, while the UPC consolidated its support in the north. This regional polarization of Ugandan politics had made the DP a convenient vehicle for Baganda to express their political aspirations, which had moved significantly towards autonomy after the apparent economic and political failure of the Ugandan state. This was further enhanced by the brutality of the new government whose army was dominated by northerners. To many Baganda, the DP was the first stage to achieving the return of the Kabaka and the "independence" of Buganda.

The leadership of the DP did not aspire to a share Bugandan independence, but went along with it.

In 1980, Paul Ssemogerere assumed leadership of the party. In 1984, he was reelected as leader over the challenge of Tiberio Okeny Atwoma. In response to Tiberio Okeny Atwoma's unsuccessful challenge, Atwoma established the Nationalist Liberal Party alongside former minister Anthony Ochaya, Cuthbert Joseph Obwangor, and Francis Bwenge. This new party was eventually re-integrated with the Democratic Party.

Paul Ssemogerere was a political novice but used the Buganda aspiration effectively and provided a significant challenge to the UPC led once again by Obote in the 1980 elections. These elections are widely believed to have been rigged by the military junta that ruled Uganda after Amin in favour of Obote and the UPC.

A third political party, the Uganda Patriotic Movement (UPM) led by Yoweri Museveni, rejected the result and went to the bush to start a guerrilla war. There was pressure on the DP to reject the result, but the leadership decided to take their seats in parliament much to the disappointment of their supporters. However one of the DP's younger leaders, Andrew Kayiira, did take up arms to fight the new government, joining an organisation called the Uganda Freedom Movement.

When Museveni came to power, he was able to outflank any support the DP retained in Buganda by allowing the Kabaka's son to return and be crowned as a ceremonial king. The DP performed so badly in the elections in 2006, it is doubtful whether the party will ever regain its popularity.

On 13 August 2020, 16 more Members of Parliament, joined the NUP political party, crossing from the Democratic Party (DP), and retaining only 4 MPs.

== Factions ==
Since the 2006 elections, pluralism has struggled to find its place in Ugandan politics. State sponsored in-fighting and factionalism have driven away many of its traditional supporters. They do fear that their small scale market gardening businesses, would be targeted by the NRM-No-Party-Home-grown democracy of Mr. Yoweri Kaguta Museveni who has enjoyed fiscal economic growth up to 6%. His regime openly claims to want and need no foreign aid as Ugandans are happy to be sleeping well regardless of their surviving under poverty.

== Election results ==
=== Presidential elections ===
Election	Party candidate	Votes	%	Result
2006	John Ssebaana Kizito	109,583	1.58%	Lost ✗
2011	Norbert Mao	147,917	1.86%	Lost ✗
2016	Did not Participate			
2021	Norbert Mao	55,665	0.56%	Lost ✗

=== Parliament of Uganda elections ===
Election	Votes	%	Votes	%	Seats	+/–	Position
Election	Constituency		Women		Seats	+/–	Position
1958	140,740	26.3%	—N/a		1 / 10	New	▲2nd
1961	436,420	42.5%	—N/a		42 / 82	▲42	2nd
1962	484,324	46.1%	—N/a		24 / 82	▼19	2nd
1980	1,966,244	47.1%	—N/a		50 / 126	▲26	▲1st
2006					8 / 319	▼42	▼4th
2011	476,415	6.04%	325,660	4.41%	12 / 375	▲4	▲3rd
2016	349,962	4.34%	246,284	3.38%	15 / 426	▲3	3rd
2021	244,194	2.44%	172,364	1.70%	9 / 529	▼6	▼4th
2026	106,583	1.02%	18,216	0.18%	6 / 529	▼3	▼6th

== Bibliography ==
- Apter, D.E. "The Political Kingdom in Uganda," Princeton. University Press, Princeton, New Jersey, 1961
- Gray, J.M. (1950) "The Year of the three Kings," Uganda Journal, March, 1950.
- Hansen, H B (1984) Mission, Church and State in a Colonial Setting, 1890-1925" Heinmann, Nairobi & London, 1984.
- Lockard, K. ( 1980) 'Religion and Politics in independent Uganda: the movement toward secularization", in Scaritt, J.R. (editor) "Analysing Political Change in Africa," Colorado (USA), Westview Press.
- Lockard, K. 'Religion and Political Development in Uganda, 1962-1972, (unpublished PhD. dissertation, University of Wisconsin 1974) (A microfilm copy of this thesis is available in the University of Nairobi Library).
- Low, D.A. "Political Parties in Uganda, 1949-62," London, Athlone Press (1962); also in Low, D.A. "Buganda in Modern History,"Berkeley & Los Angeles, University of California Press, 1967.
- Mutibwa, P.M. "Internal Self-Government: March 1961 to October 1962," in Uzoigwe, G.N. (editor) "Uganda: the Dilemma of Nationhood," New York & London: NOK Publishers, 1982.
- Obote, A.M. "Notes on Concealment of Genocide in Uganda," Lusaka, Zambia.
- Rowe, John (1969) 'Lugard at Kampala; Makerere History Papers Kampala, Longmans.
- Santhymurthy, T.V., "The Political Development of Uganda: 1900-1986,"Aldershot, Hants, England: Gowers Publishing Company, 1986.
- Twaddle, M. (J 972) "The Muslim Revolution in Buganda" African Affairs Volume 77
- Twaddle, M (1988) "The emergence of politico-religious groupings in late 19th century Buganda," Journal of African History Volume 29.
- Wright, M. (1971) "Buganda in a Heroic Age," Oxford University Press, Nairobi, 1971
- Adhola, Yoga: "The Roots of the Democratic Party," found at http://www.upcparty.net/memboard/2012/rootsofparty.pdf Also see The Monitor at http://www.monitor.co.ug/SpecialReports/ugandaat50/-/1370466/1377422/-/ujiydez/-/index.html continued at http://www.monitor.co.ug/SpecialReports/ugandaat50/-/1370466/1382168/-/uj0yblz/-/index.html
