= Rose Emma Cherukut =

Ugandan politician

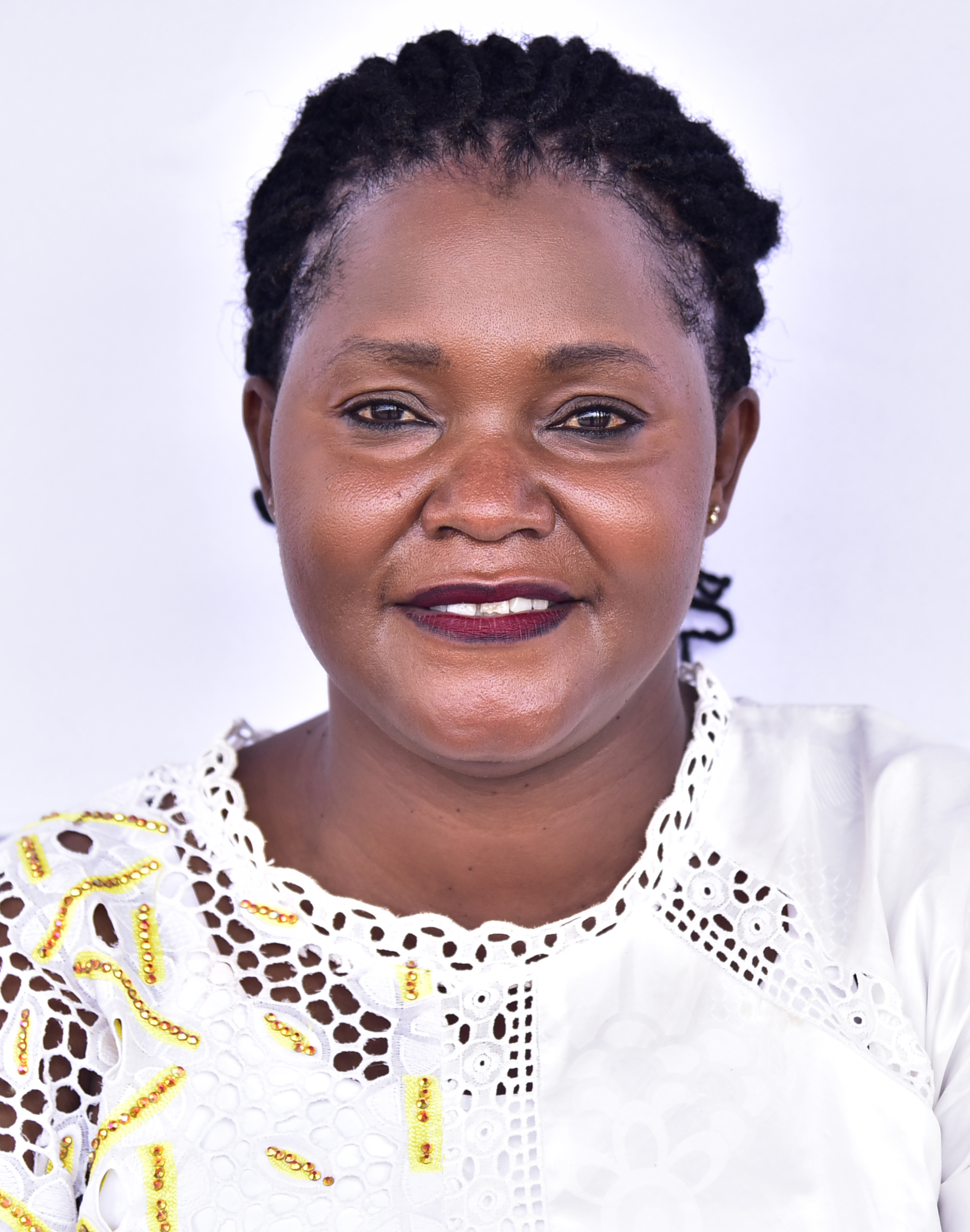
- Citizenship: Uganda
- Occupations: Politician and legislator
- Employer(s): Kapchorwa district Kween district Parliament of Uganda
- Known for: Politics
- Title: Member of Parliament
- Political party: National Resistance Movement (NRM)
- Relatives: Lydia Chekwel

Rose Emma Cherukut is a Ugandan politician and legislator. She represents the people of Kween district as district woman MP in the parliament of Uganda. She is a member of National Resistance Movement (NRM) a party under the chairmanship of Yoweri Kaguta Museveni president of the republic of Uganda.

== Career ==
Cherukut is a former Resident District Commissioner (RDC) for Kapchorwa district. She started her political career in 2011 alongside her aunt chekwel Lydia but lost the seat to her aunt, she contested again in 2015 NRM party primaries which she won but lost the final election in 2016 general polls to her aunt who after losing in primaries decided to run as independent candidate she came to parliament in 2021 after winning the MP seat with 19,479 votes against her same aunt Chekwel Lydia who garnered 13,550 votes in 2021 general polls. She was appointed as the RDC for kapchorwa after the 2016 polls by his Excellency Yoweri Kaguta Museveni.

== Controversy ==
Cherukut was accused of high handedness when one of her body guards while she was still RDC in Kapchorwa shot dead a 14-year-old girl while trying to disperse drunkards who had violated COVID-19 curfew rules.

== See Also ==
- Anita Among
- Thomas Tayebwa
- Santa Okot
- Betty Aol Ochan
