= Obote =

Obote is a surname. Notable people with the surname include:

- Jimmy Akena Obote (born 1967), Ugandan politician
- Milton Obote (1925–2005), former president of Uganda
- Miria Obote (born 1936), Ugandan politician, widow of Milton
