= Annet Kirabo =

Ugandan researcher

Dr. Annet Kirabo
- Born: Uganda
- Education: Makerere University, St. Cloud University, University of Florida.
- Occupation: researcher
- Employer: Vanderbilt University

Annet Kirabo is a Ugandan researcher and Associate Professor of Medicine in the Department of Medicine at Vanderbilt University Medical Center. She holds the same capacity in the Department of Molecular Physiology and Biophysics at Vanderbilt University. Her work and research is focused on the interaction between oxidative stress and inflammation as they relate to hypertension and kidney disease. Dr. Kirabo directs the Vanderbilt Federation of Clinical Immunology Societies (FOCIS) Center of Excellence and was named a Chancellor Faculty Fellow in 2024 as an American Heart Association fellow and served on editorial boards and committees on hypertension. Dr. Kirabo has been invited to offer public lectures nationally and internationally on hypertension.

== Education ==
Dr. Annet Kirabo earned her degree in veterinary medicine at the Makerere University School of Veterinary Medicine in Kampala, Uganda. She received her master's degree from St. Cloud State University in St. Cloud, Minnesota and later did her PhD at the University of Florida, Gainesville. Her research area mainly focuses on cardiovascular biology, metabolism, obesity, and immunology.

== Awards ==
Dr. Kirabo received an award from the American Heart Association and the American Physiological Society, who fund her hypertension research work.

== See also ==
- Olive Kobusingye
- Justina Geraldine Najjuka
