= 2001 Ugandan presidential election =

- 12 March 2001
- Registered: 10,775,836
- Turnout: 70.31%
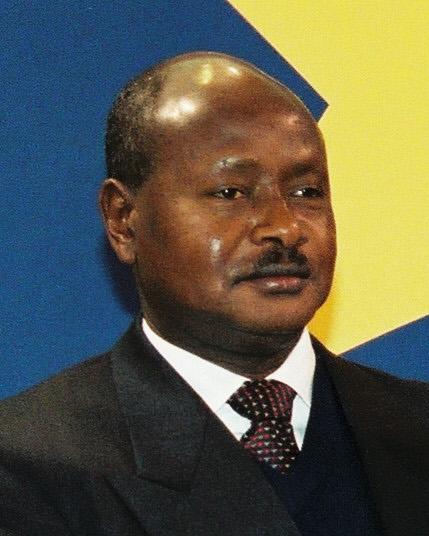

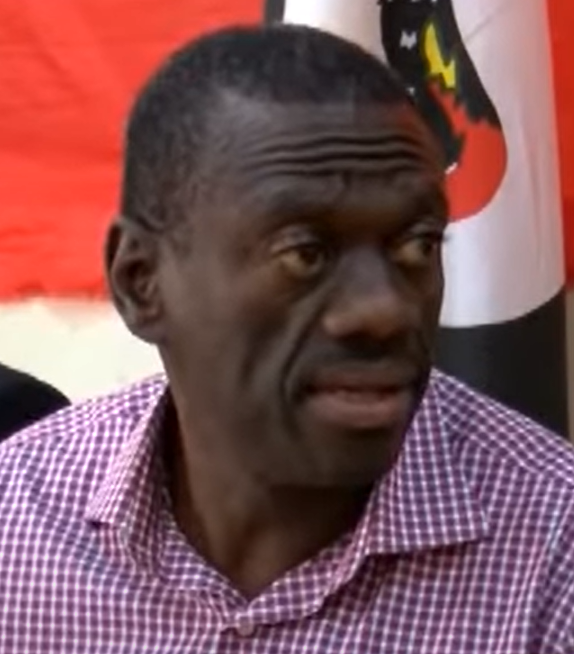
| Candidate | Yoweri Museveni | Kizza Besigye |
| Party | Independent | Independent |
| Popular vote | 5,088,470 | 2,029,190 |
| Percentage | 69.45% | 27.69% |
- Results by district Museveni: 50–60% 60–70% 70–80% 80–90% >90% Besigye: 50–60% 70–80% 80–90%
President before election
Yoweri Museveni
Independent
Elected President
Yoweri Museveni
Independent

Presidential elections were held in Uganda on 12 March 2001. The incumbent Yoweri Museveni received 69% of the vote and was elected to a second term. All candidates were independents, as political parties were banned at the time. Voter turnout was 70%.

== Candidates ==
Yoweri Museveni was running for his second term in office in 2001. He took power in 1986 after winning a guerrilla war against President Tito Okello. Museveni's main rival was four-time rival Kizza Besigye, who was Museveni's personal physician and a military officer who broke ties with the NRM government in 2001.

== Results ==
| Candidate | Party | Votes | % |
|---|---|---|---|
| Yoweri Museveni | Independent | 5,088,470 | 69.45 |
| Kizza Besigye | Independent | 2,029,190 | 27.69 |
| Aggrey Awori | Independent | 103,653 | 1.41 |
| Kibirige Mayanja | Independent | 73,045 | 1.00 |
| Francis Bwengye | Independent | 22,666 | 0.31 |
| Karuhanga Chapaa | Independent | 10,055 | 0.14 |
| Total | | 7,327,079 | 100.00 |
| Valid votes | | 7,327,079 | 97.54 |
| Invalid/blank votes | | 184,527 | 2.46 |
| Total votes | | 7,511,606 | 100.00 |
| Registered voters/turnout | | 10,775,836 | 69.71 |
Source: Electoral Commission

== Post-election events ==
Besigye did not concede the race but instead requested a formal vote recount on the basis of voter fraud. Museveni also claimed that there was a "rigging" of the vote, albeit in Besigye's favour; he also remarked that he should have won 75% of the vote instead. The independent election watchdog Election Monitoring Group found voter fraud to be minimal. The same day after results were announced, a pipe bomb exploded in downtown Kampala, killing one woman; a similar explosion occurred on a minibus headed towards the capital, injuring three people. However, it was not immediately clear if the explosions were related to the presidential election. In a majority decision, the Supreme Court of Uganda subsequently rejected Besigye's petition for a recount. Shortly after being elected to a second term as president, Museveni pledged to step down before the next election but subsequently walked back on his promise.
