= 2001 Ugandan parliamentary election =

Parliamentary elections were held in Uganda on 26 June 2001. At the time, the constitution banned all political parties (a referendum on changing to a multi-party system having failed the previous year), so all members were elected as independents. 214 of the 295 in Parliament were up for election, with the others reserved for the Army (10 seats), youth and women.

The majority of members (more than 200) supported the Movement system, although twelve ministers lost their seats.

== Results ==
Party	Votes	%	Seats	+/–
Independents			214	0
Indirectly-elected seats			81	+12
Total			295	+12
Total votes	7,576,144	–		
Registered voters/turnout	10,561,779	71.73		
Source: IPU
