= Olara Otunnu =

Ugandan politician, diplomat, and lawyer

Olara A. Otunnu
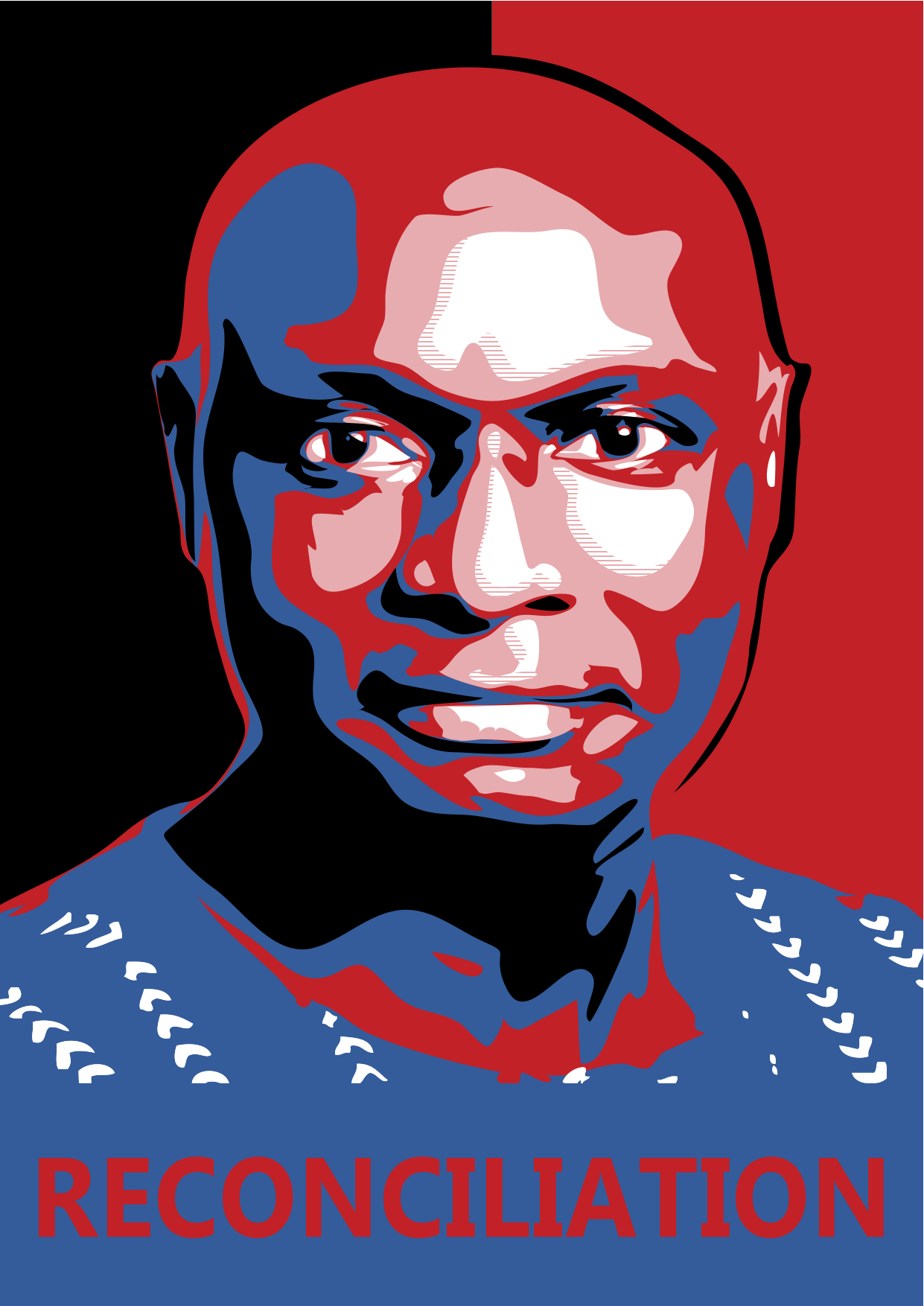
- A 2011 election poster of Otunnu by Samson Mwaka

President of the Uganda People's Congress
- In office 2010–2015
- Preceded by: Miria Obote
- Succeeded by: Jimmy Akena

Minister of Foreign Affairs (Uganda)
- In office 1985–1986

Permanent Representative of Uganda to the United Nations
- In office 1980–1985

Under-Secretary-General of the United Nations Special Representative for Children and Armed Conflict
- In office 1997–2005

Personal details
- Born: 6 September 1950 (age 76) Mucwini, Uganda
- Citizenship: Ugandan
- Party: Uganda People's Congress
- Education: Makerere University; University of Oxford; Harvard Law School
- Occupation: Politician, diplomat, lawyer
- Known for: International diplomacy, human rights advocacy and Ugandan politics
- Awards: German Africa Prize (2002); Sydney Peace Prize (2005)

Olara A. Otunnu (born 6 September 1950) is a Ugandan politician, diplomat, and lawyer. He was President of the Uganda People's Congress political party (UPC) from 2010 to 2015 and stood as the party's candidate in the 2011 presidential election. Otunnu was Uganda's Permanent Representative to the United Nations from 1980 to 1985 and served as Minister of Foreign Affairs from 1985 to 1986. Later, he was President of the International Peace Academy from 1990 to 1998, and an Under-Secretary-General of the United Nations and Special Representative for Children and Armed Conflict from 1997 to 2005.

== Background ==
Otunnu was born in Mucwini, among the Acholi people of northern Uganda. His father was a key leader in the East African Revival movement.

== Education ==
He received his early education at Mvara, Mucwini, and Anaka primary schools. He received his secondary education at Gulu High School and King's College Budo. He then attended Makerere University, where he was president of the Students' Guild. Throughout his time as a student, he played an integral role leading the resistance movement against the Idi Amin regime, co-founding and serving as Secretary General of the Uganda Freedom Union, an organization that brought a number of patriotic Ugandans together in the struggle against Amin. Facing increasing threats from the government, Otunnu was forced into exile in 1973, evading arrest and escaping the country into Nairobi, Kenya. There, he received an Overseas Scholarship to attend Oxford University. In 1976, he attended Harvard Law School under a Fulbright Scholarship.

== Career ==
From 1980 to 1985, Otunnu served as Uganda's representative at the United Nations. In 1980, he was appointed Uganda's permanent representative at the UN by President Milton Obote. During this period, he served in a variety of major roles. In 1981, he was named president of the UN Security Council, where he presided over the election of Secretary-General Javier Pérez de Cuéllar and invented the system of straw balloting commonly known as the Otunnu Formula still in use today. From 1982 to 1983, he served as a Vice-President of the UN General Assembly, as well as Chairman of the Contact Group on Global Negotiations. The following year he worked as the Chairman of the UN Commission on Human Rights.

From 1985 to 1986, Otunnu served as Uganda's Minister of Foreign Affairs, and played a critical role in orchestrating the Nairobi Agreement of December 1985.

Otunnu was appointed President of the International Peace Institute in 1990, and served in that role until 1998, transforming the profile of the organization, attracting major new funding, and expanding its operations.

Otunnu was appointed by United Nations Secretary-General Kofi Annan as Under-Secretary-General and Special Representative for Children in Armed Conflict on 19 August 1997, taking office on 1 September 1997.

In September 1998, Otunnu spoke at the 10th anniversary convention of the Ugandan North American Association (UNAA) in Houston, Texas, where he said that Ugandan parents were part of the armed conflict because they instill deep hatred in their children for people who do not speak their languages.

Otunnu ran in 2010 to succeed Miria Obote, wife of former President Milton Obote, as president of the UPC. On 14 May, he defeated her son, Jimmy Akena, at a UPC delegates conference. UPC nominated him in November 2010 as its presidential candidate. On election day in 2011, however, he refused to vote, even for himself. He received 1.58 percent of the vote.

Olara Otunnu meeting with Giorgos Gerapetritis, the Minister of Foreign Affairs of Greece, during Otunnu's 2026 UN Secretary-General candidacy run.

Prior to the 2026 United Nations Secretary-General selection to replace Antonio Guterres, Otunu declared his intention to stand for the office and was endorsed by President Yoweri Museveni to contest the selection as the candidate for Uganda.

== Awards and nominations ==
Otunnu has received several major international awards, including the Distinguished Service Award from the United Nations Association of the United States of America (2001); German Africa Prize (2002); the Sydney Peace Prize (2005); and the Global Award for Outstanding Contribution to Human Rights (India, 2006). In 2007, he received the Harvard Law School Association Award, presented by its president Jay H. Hebert and Elena Kagan (an Associate Justice of the Supreme Court of the United States).

Otunnu serves a variety of advisory roles at an array of civic organizations, including: trustee at the Aspen Institute, juror at the McNulty Foundation, adviser to Aspen France, Aspen Italia, the Carnegie Endowment for International Peace, the Carnegie Corporation of New York, the Hilton Humanitarian Prize, the International Selection Commission of the Philadelphia Liberty Medal, the International Crisis Group (ICG), the Council of African Advisers of the World Bank, the Advisory Committee of the Stockholm International Peace Research Institute (SIPRI), and founder of the LBL Foundation for Children.

== See also ==
- Miria Obote
- Jimmy Akena
- Ruhakana Rugunda
