= 2011 Ugandan general election =

- 18 February 2011
- Presidential election
- Registered: 13,954,129
- Turnout: 59.29% (▼9.90pp)
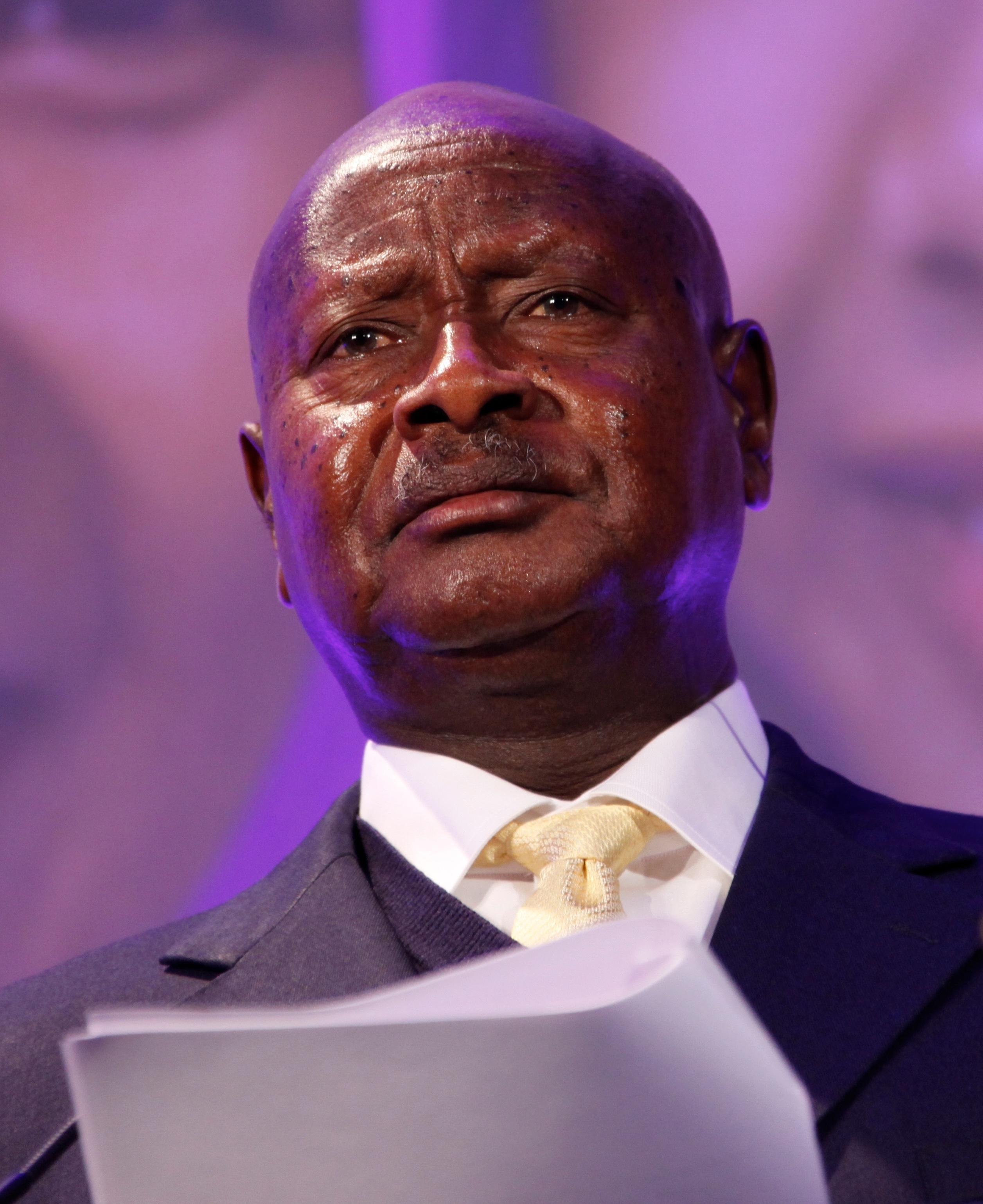

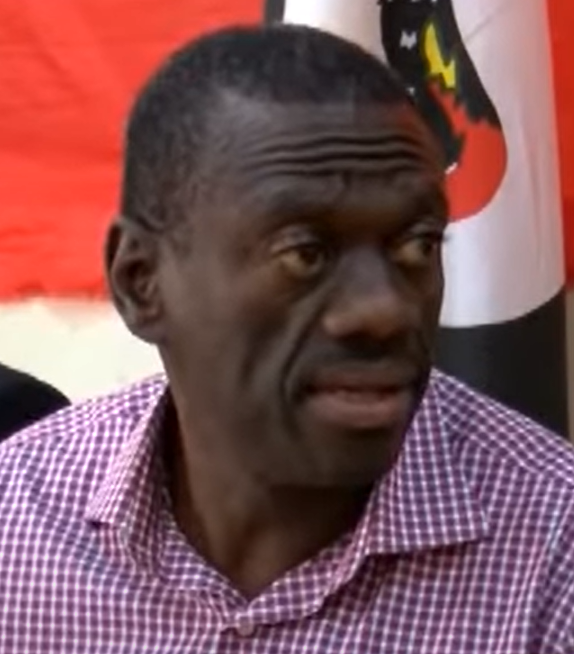
Nominee	Yoweri Museveni	Kizza Besigye
Party	NRM	FDC
Popular vote	5,428,369	2,064,963
Percentage	68.38%	26.01%
President before election
Yoweri Museveni
NRM
Elected President
Yoweri Museveni
NRM
- Parliamentary election
- 365 of the 375 seats in Parliament; 183 seats needed for a majority
Party	Leader	Vote %	Seats	+/–
NRM	Yoweri Museveni	49.22	263	+50
FDC	Kizza Besigye	13.56	34	−3
DP	Norbert Mao	6.04	12	+4
UPC	Olara Otunnu	3.37	10	+1
JEEMA	Asuman Basalirwa	0.64	1	0
CP	Ken Lukyamuzi	0.61	1	0
Independents	–	25.78	43	+3
This lists parties that won seats. See the complete results below.
Speaker of Parliament before	Speaker of Parliament after
Edward Ssekandi; NRM	Rebecca Kadaga; NRM

General elections were held in Uganda on 18 February 2011. Incumbent President Yoweri Museveni of the National Resistance Movement (NRM) was re-elected for a third time, having been in power since 1986. The NRM also won 263 of the 375 seats in Parliament.

== Background ==
Museveni, a former guerilla commander, had ruled Uganda for nearly 30 years at the time of the elections. Kizza Besigye and Museveni faced each other for the third time, having previously been allies; Besigye was defeated by Museveni in the 2001 and 2006 elections.

== Campaign ==
At the time of the elections, Uganda was facing a potential oil shock, which became a campaign issue.

Eight candidates contested the presidential elections, whilst a total of 1,713 candidates ran in the parliamentary elections; 1,270 for the constituency seats and 443 for the women's seats. The NRM contested every constituency seat, putting forward a total of 364 candidates. The Forum for Democratic Change nominated 288, the Uganda People's Congress 135, the Democratic Party 120, the Uganda Federal Alliance 66, the People's Progressive Party 33, and the People's Development Party 18.

== Conduct ==
European Union observers said the election was "marred by avoidable and logistical failures, which led to an unacceptable number of Ugandan citizens being disenfranchised."

== Results ==
=== President ===
Candidate	Party	Votes	%
Yoweri Museveni	National Resistance Movement	5,428,369	68.38
Kizza Besigye	Forum for Democratic Change	2,064,963	26.01
Norbert Mao	Democratic Party	147,917	1.86
Olara Otunnu	Uganda People's Congress	125,059	1.58
Beti Kamya	Uganda Federal Alliance	52,782	0.66
Abed Bwanika	People's Development Party	51,708	0.65
Jaberi Bidandi Ssali	People's Progressive Party	34,688	0.44
Samuel Lubega	Independent	32,726	0.41
Total		7,938,212	100.00
Valid votes		7,938,212	95.96
Invalid/blank votes		334,548	4.04
Total votes		8,272,760	100.00
Registered voters/turnout		13,954,129	59.29
Source: Electoral Commission

=== Parliament ===
Party	Constituency			Women			Seats		
Party	Votes	%	Seats	Votes	%	Seats	Appointed	Total	+/–
National Resistance Movement	3,883,209	49.22	164	3,803,608	51.56	86	13	263	+50
Forum for Democratic Change	1,070,109	13.56	23	1,242,218	16.84	11	0	34	–3
Democratic Party	476,415	6.04	11	325,660	4.41	1	0	12	+4
Uganda People's Congress	265,568	3.37	7	237,477	3.22	3	0	10	+1
Justice Forum	50,120	0.64	1	10,796	0.15	0	0	1	0
Conservative Party	48,276	0.61	1	1,084	0.01	0	0	1	0
Uganda Federal Alliance	23,585	0.30	0	34,346	0.47	0	0	0	New
People's Progressive Party	15,692	0.20	0	26,320	0.36	0	0	0	New
Forum for Integrity in Leadership	8,871	0.11	0				0	0	New
Social Democratic Party	5,664	0.07	0				0	0	New
Popular People's Democracy	3,399	0.04	0				0	0	New
People's Development Party	2,526	0.03	0	1,853	0.03	0	0	0	New
Liberal Democratic Transparency	2,035	0.03	0	3,997	0.05	0	0	0	New
Green Partisan Party	297	0.00	0				0	0	New
Uganda Economic Party	207	0.00	0				0	0	New
Independents	2,034,250	25.78	30	1,689,389	22.90	11	2	43	+3
Uganda People's Defence Force							10	10	0
Vacant			1				–	1	–
Total	7,890,223	100.00	238	7,376,748	100.00	112	25	375	+56
Source: Electoral Commission, Election Passport

== Aftermath ==
The four-party Inter-Party Cooperation chairman Kizza Besigye said before the results were announced that the opposition "categorically rejects the outcome of the elections." He later warned that Uganda was ripe for an Egypt-style revolt after Museveni's more than two decades in power. However, the protesters failed to amass in large numbers because, as The Christian Science Monitor suggested, a failure to tally its own results through its own SMS system was disrupted by the government, who also arrested hundreds of opposition field agents. They also suggested that Besigye did not believe his own claim of sparking a revolution. After losing out twice to Museveni – whose personal physician and loyal ally he once was – this third attempt seems to have shattered him.
