= Uganda Federal Alliance =

Political party in Uganda

Uganda Federal Alliance is a national political party in Uganda which was registered to Electoral Commission of Uganda on July 19, 2010.

== Seats in Parliament ==
In the 2011 Ugandan general election, this party was in fifth place in presidential race. In 2016 Ugandan general election, Uganda Federal Alliance got six seats in Parliament of Uganda.
