= Jaberi Bidandi Ssali =

Ugandan politician (born 1937)

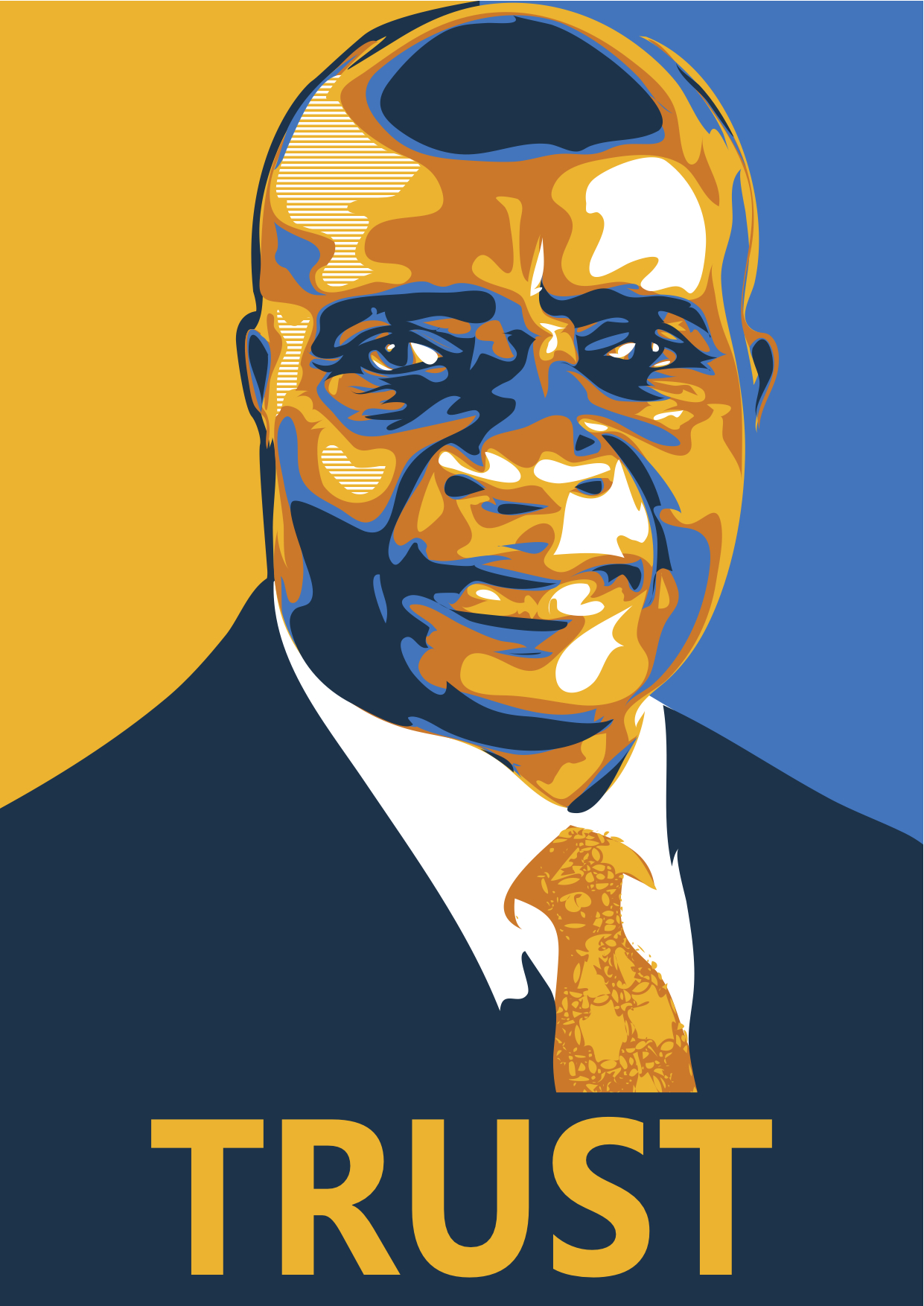

President of the People's Progressive Party
- In office December 2005 (Note: Interim until June 2008) – 19 September 2015
- Preceded by: Office established
- Succeeded by: Dick Odur

Personal details
- Born: 17 July 1937 (age 89) Butambala, Uganda
- Party: People's Progressive Party (since 2004)
- Other political affiliations: National Resistance Movement (until 2004)
- Spouse: Suzaana Kiganda Nampinga
- Education: Uganda Martyrs University (BA)
- Occupation: Businessman
Association football career
Managerial career
- Years: Team
- 1974–1979: Kampala City Council
- 1982: Uganda

Jaberi Bidandi Ssali (born 1937) is a Ugandan politician, businessman, and former football manager. He founded the People's Progressive Party in 2004 and served as its president until 2015. He was also the Minister for Local Government from 1989 to 2004, and an unsuccessful candidate in the 2011 Ugandan general election. In the 1970s and early 1980s, Bidandi Ssali worked as a football manager, coaching the Uganda national team in 1982.

== Background and education ==
Bidandi Ssali was born in Butambala District, in the Central Region of Uganda, on 17 July 1937 to Bumaali Kakonge Matembe and Nalongo Eriosi Bulyaba. He attended local elementary schools before joining Kibuli Junior School. He transferred to Nyakasura School for his A-Level education. He studied at a university in Pakistan, pursuing a degree in agriculture, but left before graduation. He holds the degree of Bachelor of Arts in Local Governance and Human Rights, obtained from Uganda Martyrs University. As of October 2012, he was pursuing a master's degree from the same university.

== Career ==
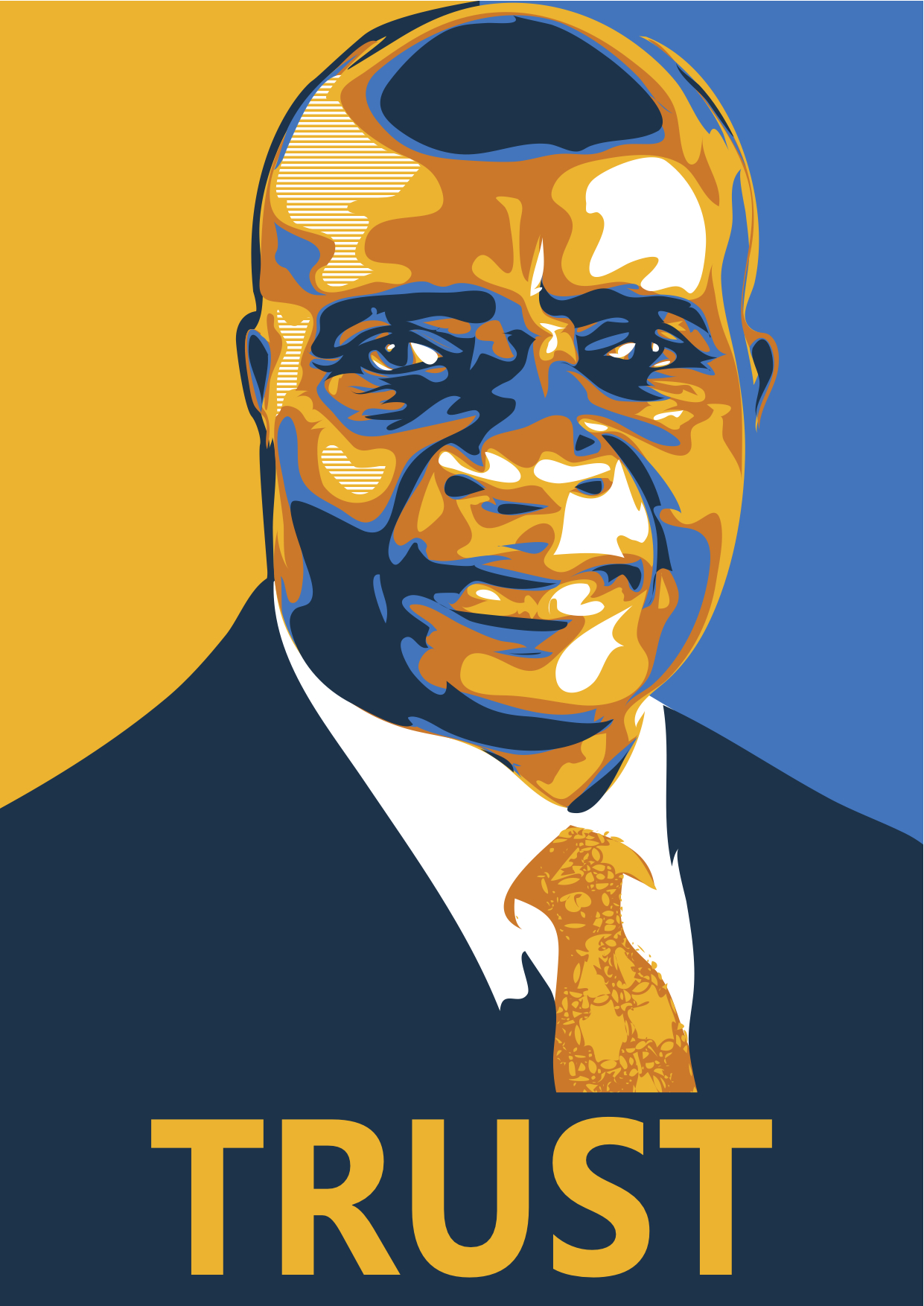
Jaberi Bidandi Ssali 2011

At the time of Uganda's independence in 1962, Bidandi Ssali was a mobilizer for the Uganda People's Congress, led by Milton Obote, Uganda's first Prime Minister. During the regime of Idi Amin, he turned his focus to football, coaching Kampala City Council FC from 1974 until 1979. In the year 1982, Bidandi was the team coach for the Uganda national team, nicknamed "The Cranes".

Bidandi Ssali also worked as the deputy city mayor for Kampala in 1964 a role he used to foresee some infrastructural developments in Kampala such as the construction of Uganda Commercial Bank Building.

In 1980, when Yoweri Museveni went to the bush to wage the Ugandan Bush War, Bidandi Ssali did not go with him, although he clandestinely offered assistance to NRA supporters who sought his help. When Museveni won that war, Bidandi Ssali worked with him in the new government as Minister of Local Government from 1989 until 2004. In 2004, he resigned from the Cabinet after disagreeing with Museveni over the latter's desire to run for a third term as president.

Bidandi Ssali founded the National Progressive Movement (NPM) in 2004, which became the People's Progressive Party (PPP) in December 2005. He served as its interim president until 14 June 2008, at which time he was elected as president by the party's delegates. He was succeeded by Dick Odur on 19 September 2015.

== Other considerations ==
- Jaberi Bidandi Ssali's sister, Deborah Nakafeero Wavamunno, was at one time married to Kirunda Kivejinja.
- Bindandi, Kivejinja and former Prime Minister Kintu Musoke were shareholders in Sapoba Printing Press & Bookshop, a 1970s Kampala publishing house and bookstore, which has since gone out of business. Bidandi used his proceeds from the dissolution of Sapoba to open Kiwatule Recreational Centre.
- Bidandi Ssali is the biological father of music artist Bebe Cool.
