= Kizza Besigye =

Ugandan politician

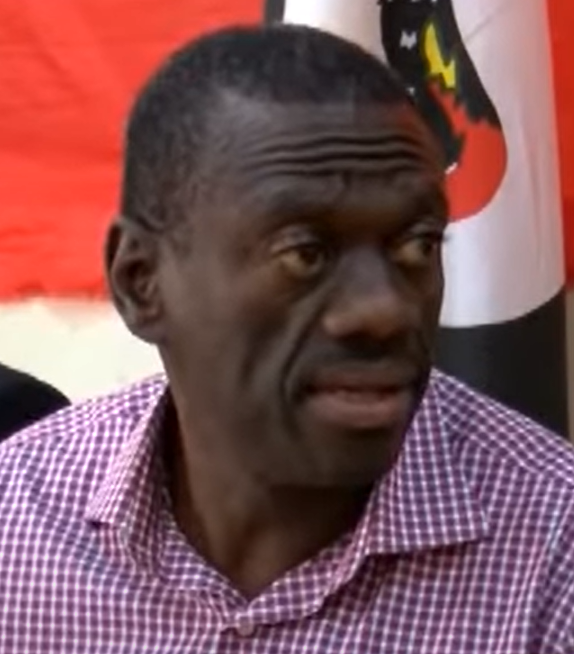

Personal details
- Born: Warren Kizza Besigye Kifefe; 22 April 1956 (age 70) Rukungiri, British Uganda
- Party: Forum for Democratic Change
- Other political affiliations: National Resistance Movement (until 1999)
- Spouse: Winnie Byanyima
- Children: Adam Ampa Besigye; Anselm Kizza Besigye
- Relatives: Olive Kobusingye (sister)
- Education: Makerere University

Military service
- Allegiance: Uganda
- Branch: NRA (1982–1986); UPDF
- Service years: 1982–1999
- Rank: Colonel
- Conflicts: Ugandan Bush War; War in Uganda (1986–1994)

Warren Kizza Besigye Kifefe (/ˈbɛsɪdʒi/; born 22 April 1956), commonly known by his nickname Colonel Dr. Kizza Besigye, is a Ugandan physician, politician, and former military officer. He served as the president of the Forum for Democratic Change (FDC) political party and was an unsuccessful candidate in Uganda's 2001, 2006, 2011, and 2016 presidential elections, losing all of them to the incumbent, Yoweri Museveni, who has been president of Uganda since 1986. The results of the 2006 elections were contested in court, and the court found massive rigging and disenfranchisement. Besigye allowed an early internal FDC election for a successor president, which took place on 24 November 2012.

== Early life and family ==
Warren Kizza Besigye Kifefe was born in Rwakabengo, Rukungiri Municipality, Rukungiri District, southwestern Uganda, on 22 April 1956. He is the second-born in a family of 6, and both his parents died before he finished primary school. His father was a policeman. He went to Kinyasano Primary School and Mbarara Junior School for his Primary school education. He later joined Kampala's Kitante High School for his Ordinary Levels and then Kigezi High School in Kabale district for his Advanced Level education.

Besigye enrolled at Makerere University in 1975 and graduated with a degree in human medicine in 1980. While in the bush, he became Museveni's personal physician. When the National Resistance Movement and Army (NRM/A) came to power in January 1986, he was appointed Minister of State for Internal Affairs. He later held the positions of Minister of State in the President's office and National Political Commissar. In 1991, he became the commanding officer of the mechanized regiment in Masaka, central Uganda, and in 1993 was appointed the army's chief of logistics and engineering.

On 7 July 1999, Besigye married Winnie Byanyima, a Ugandan Member of Parliament, in Nsambya, Kampala.

== Career ==
After graduating, Besigye briefly worked at Mulago National Hospital. He later went into exile in Kenya, where he applied to the Medical Board for registration to work as a doctor. After getting registered, he applied for and received a job at the Aga Khan Hospital. He worked as a doctor there and later at Kenyatta National Hospital before joining Museveni's rebel National Resistance Movement/Army (NRM/A) in 1982.

== Political life ==
November 6th 1999, Besigye wrote a document critical of the government, "An Insider's View of How the NRM Lost the Broad Base". The document accused the NRM of becoming a sectarian kleptocracy and a one-man dictatorship. Besigye was charged before a court-martial for "airing his views at the wrong forum". He brokered a deal in 2000 in which the charges were dropped in exchange for an apology for publishing the document.

In October 28th 2000, Besigye announced that he would run against Museveni in the 2001 elections. He retired from the Uganda People's Defence Forces in 2001, having attained the rank of colonel. During his campaign, Besigye, who was Museveni's strongest opponent, accused the government of widespread corruption and pushed for an end to Museveni's "Movement" system, which he said had served its purpose as an instrument in Uganda's political transition to multiparty democracy.

He lost the election, which was marred by claims of widespread vote rigging, violence and coercion of voters. In March 2001 Besigye petitioned the Supreme Court to nullify the election results. A panel of five judges voted 5–0 that there had been cheating but decided 3–2 not to annul the elections.

In June 2001, Besigye was briefly arrested and questioned by the police over allegations of treason. The government accused him of being behind a shadowy rebel group, the People's Redemption Army (PRA), allegedly based in the Democratic Republic of the Congo (DRC). Besigye's supporters said the government had fabricated the existence of the insurgents to harm his credibility among Ugandans and the international community.

In August 2001, Besigye fled the country, citing persecution by the state. He said he was afraid for his life. He lived in South Africa for four years, during which time he continued to criticise Museveni's government. Besigye returned to Uganda on 26 October 2005, just in time to register as a voter in the 2006 elections. He was greeted by thousands and hit the campaign trail almost immediately, addressing throngs of supporters across the country. In November 2005, William Lacy Swing, the United Nations special envoy to the Great Lakes region, confirmed the existence of the PRA, naming it as one of the foreign, armed groups operating in the eastern DRC.

Besigye's campaign came to an abrupt halt on 14 November when he was arrested on charges of treason and rape. The treason charges pertained to his alleged links to the PRA and the 20-year-old northern Ugandan Lord's Resistance Army rebellion. The rape charge related to a 1997 accusation by the daughter of a deceased friend. His arrest sparked riots in Kampala and around the country. Museveni was accused of trumping up charges against Besigye in an attempt to discredit him or prevent him from standing in the election. Both the local and international community came down heavily against Museveni's administration, urging it to release Besigye on bail. The government reacted by banning all public rallies, demonstrations, assemblies or seminars related to Besigye's trial. It further barred the media from discussing the trial, threatening media houses with the revocation of their licenses should they refuse to heed the ban.

On 25 November, Uganda's high court granted Besigye bail, but he was immediately sent back to jail on military charges of terrorism and the illegal possession of weapons. Besigye denied the charges and has argued that as a retiree from the armed forces, he should no longer be subject to an army court-martial. He was freed on bail by the high court on 6 January. Although the charges against him stand, Besigye continues to pursue his ambition to become the next president of Uganda.

== February 2006 elections ==
The general elections of 2006 saw FDC as the main opposition party and Besigye as the main challenger against Museveni for the presidency. He stood with Miria Kalule Obote, the first female presidential candidate for the Uganda People's Congress (UPC), Abed Bwanika, who stood as an independent, John Ssebana Kizito for Democratic Party (DP). Museveni was elected to another five-year term, having won 59% of the vote to Besigye's 37%. Besigye, who alleged fraud, rejected the result. The Supreme Court of Uganda later ruled that the election was marred by intimidation, violence, voter disenfranchisement, and other irregularities, but voted 4–3 to uphold the results of the election.

== February 2011 elections and aftermath ==
In the 2011 elections Besigye, for the third time in a row, lost to Museveni, with a sharp decline from previous polls, failing to win in a single region. Though the election was lauded as one of the most free and fair in Ugandan history, Besigye claimed that Museveni used intimidation and rigging to win a fourth term in office.

Following his poor performance in the 2011 presidential elections, Besigye directed his party members elected to the 9th parliament to boycott it. This was rejected by the newly elected MPs, claiming that the election victory was out of their personal effort and not Besigye's or the Party, contributing to rising tensions within the FDC.

Besigye was arrested for a fourth time on 28 April 2011, during a "walk-to-work" protest over the high prices of food and fuel. He was pepper-sprayed and dragged from his car by police. This was the catalyst for additional protests leading to riots across Kampala, in which at least two people were killed and 120 people wounded, leading to some 360 arrests.

== Anti-homosexuality bill ==
Besigye opposed the reintroduction of the Uganda Anti-Homosexuality Bill into the 9th Parliament of Uganda by MP David Bahati. Besigye's support of gay rights together with Youth MP Abe Moses was a contentious issue in Uganda, where homosexuality is already a crime under the Ugandan Penal Code.

== 2012 arrest ==
Besigye was arrested on 1 October 2012 after attempting to make a speech to vendors in Kiseka market in Kampala. He was taken to a central police station in the city. Earlier, police had deployed heavily at Besigye's home in a move to block him from travelling to town to hold his rally, but he eluded the security officials until his arrest by police at the city market about an hour later.

== 2016 election ==
In the 2016 elections, Besigye again stood as the FDC presidential candidate, going up against Museveni and Amama Mbabazi. Besigye again lost to Museveni, receiving only 34 percent of the vote to Museveni's 62 percent.

In the aftermath of this election, Besigye urged his supporters to protest the results peacefully, claiming that the electoral process had been rigged "using intimidation of voters, imprisonment of opponents, sabotage of rallies, late delivery of election materials, delayed opening of election centers, vote falsification at undisclosed tally centers, and bribery, among other malpractices."

On May 11, 2016, Besigye secretly swore himself in as president of Uganda, a day before the official swearing-in ceremony of President Museveni. He was arrested by the Ugandan Army moments into his swearing in. He later established "The people's government" as he believed he was the rightful winner of the 2016 elections.

== 2021 elections ==
Besigye opted not to run for president in the 2021 elections, saying he would lead the opposition in "plan B" to cause change in the country. He allied himself with Museveni's main opponent, Bobi Wine. After the 2021 elections Besigye launched the people's front for transition, an umbrella movement with a common goal of causing change in Uganda.

== 2022 arrests ==
In May 2022, Besigye was arrested during a protest over skyrocketing commodity prices in Uganda. He was granted bail by the court's magistrate Buganda Road Court Grade One Magistrate Siena Owomugisha on condition that he would pay a USh 30,000,000/= fee for the court bail. In protest of the high fees, Besigye turned down the offer and opted for prison. His lawyers, led by Erias Lukwago, appealed for the reduction of the bail fee, and succeeded in lowering it to 3,000,000/=. He was then granted bail and came out of prison.

A few days after his release from prison on court bail, Besigye resumed protests on Kampala streets and was promptly arrested by Uganda police again, together with his colleague Samuel Lubega Makaku, and sent to prison. Efforts to apply for bail were futile since it was past court hours and his lawyers had to apply for bail on another day. The nature of the court session was protested by Besigye's lawyers, who insisted that the suspects had been attended to by the presiding magistrate past official court hours. The bail application that was later filed was also denied and dismissed by the Buganda road court grade one Magistrate Asuman Muhumuza, who said he had no guarantee that Besigye would not commit similar acts once released on bail again.

== Abduction and trial ==
In November 2024, Winnie Byanyima said that Besigye had been abducted while he was in Nairobi, Kenya on 16 November to attend a book launch for Martha Karua and was being held in a military prison in Kampala. The Kenyan government denied involvement in the incident, but a spokesperson for the Ugandan government said that Kenya had been informed. On 20 November, he appeared along with FDC member Hajj Lutale Kamulegeya before a military court in Kampala, where he was charged with possession of an illegal firearm and “soliciting military support in Geneva, Greece and Nairobi to prejudice the security of the defense forces”. Besigye and Kamulegeya pleaded not guilty and were remanded to Luzira Maximum Security Prison. In January 2025, the military court ruled that Besigye can be tried for treachery.

On 31 January 2025, the Supreme Court of Uganda declared that the trial of civilians in military courts was unconstitutional, ordering an immediate halt to all prosecutions against Besigye. However, the military announced that it would continue trying Besigye. On 11 February, Besigye began a hunger strike. On 13 February, he was described by his lawyer as being ill and in need of specialised medical care, adding that he was suffering from hypertension. On 16 February, the government said that it would transfer jurisdiction over Besigye's case to a civilian court while urging him to end his hunger strike. On 18 February, Besigye was briefly confined at a private clinic.

While in detention, Besigye launched a new political party, the People's Front for Freedom, on 8 July 2025.

== See also ==
- Elections in Uganda
- Politics of Uganda
- Political parties of Uganda
