= Santa Okot =

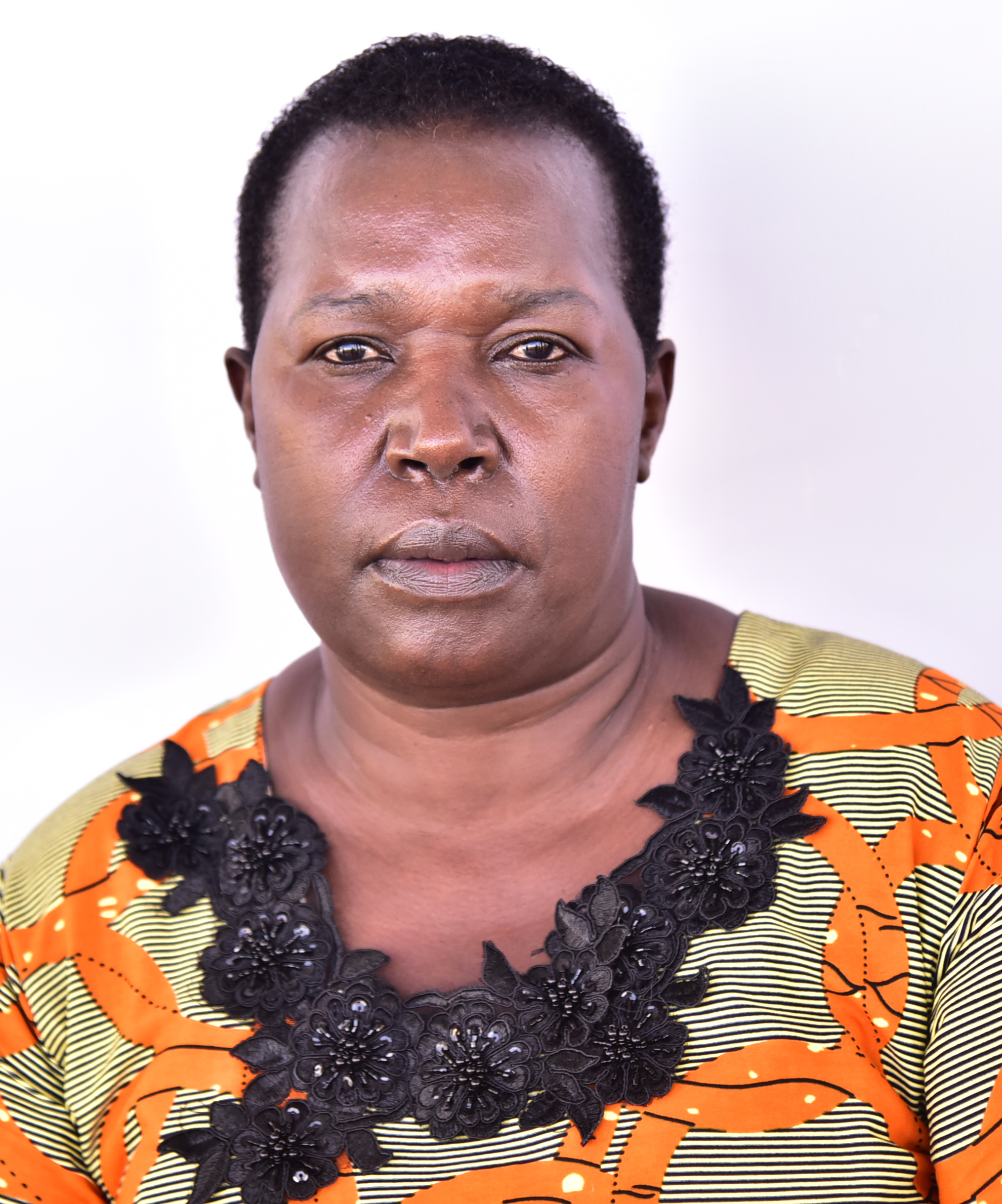
- Citizenship: Ugandan
- Education: Bachelor's Degree in Education
- Occupations: Politician, activist and educator.
- Known for: Deputy Secretary General of People's Progressive Party and a government critic especially during the lifting of the presidential term limit.
- Political party: People's Progressive Party
- Other political affiliations: National Resistance Movement

Santa Okot is a Ugandan politician, women's activist and educator who serves as the Member of Parliament representing Pader District (Aruu North) in the 11th Ugandan Parliament (2021-2026) and affiliated to the People's Progressive Party as a political party. Santa is the only MP in the 11th Parliament belonging to the People's Progressive Party. She is also the former member of the seventh Parliament of Uganda. In the 2001, she was the Woman Member of Parliament for Pader District representing the people of Aruu County under the National Resistance Movement political party. In 2006, she contested as the Member of Parliament but lost. She is known for being critical of the government for instance she has been using social media when presidential term limits were lifted in order to hold government leaders accountable.

== Education ==
She holds a bachelor's degree in Education.

== Career ==
Santa is a school teacher by profession. She is an activist for women and children. Santa worked as a Policy facilitator at African Leadership Institute. She is currently the Deputy Secretary General of People's Progressive Party. She is also a Certified Peace Builder and Negotiator. In PPP, Ms Okot is the chairperson for the women's league representing the northern region.

== Other responsibilities ==
She was a peace negotiator between the government of Uganda and the LRA, Rebels known for abducting, maiming and killing millions of Ugandans from Northern part of Uganda.

== See also ==
- List of members of the eleventh Parliament of Uganda
- List of members of the seventh Parliament of Uganda
- Beatrice Atim Anywar
- Joseph Kony
- Pader District
- Parliament of Uganda
- Member of Parliament
- National Resistance Movement
- People's Progressive Party
