= John Mugyenyi =

Ugandan military officer

- Born: Uganda
- Citizenship: Uganda
- Occupation: Military officer
- Years active: Since 1975
- Known for: Military affairs

Brigadier John Mugyenyi is a military officer in Uganda. He is a senior commander in the Uganda People's Defence Force (UPDF). As of August 2014, he was undeployed. Mugyenyi is reported to be heavily invested in construction, real estate, luxury hotels, apartment houses, and financial institutions. According to a 2014 published report, he was one of the wealthiest individuals in Uganda.

== Military service ==
He previously served as the director of the Joint Anti-Terrorist Taskforce, a rapid response, counter-terrorism unit within the UPDF. Before that, he served in 2001 as a military intelligence officer and was instrumental in defeating rebels belonging to the People's Redemption Army. He has also served as the commanding officer of Entebbe Airport Aviation Security, where his unit was active against drug smugglers. In the 1990s, he was one of the commanders in the Ituri conflict in the Democratic Republic of the Congo. In January 2005, he retired from the army at the rank of lieutenant colonel, and he has been mainly focused on his businesses, in construction and finance. In January 2013, he was promoted to the rank of brigadier.

== Personal ==
Mugyenyi is a married father.
