= 2006 Ugandan general election =

- 23 February 2006
- Registered: 10,450,788
- Presidential election
- Turnout: 69.19% (▼1.12 pp)
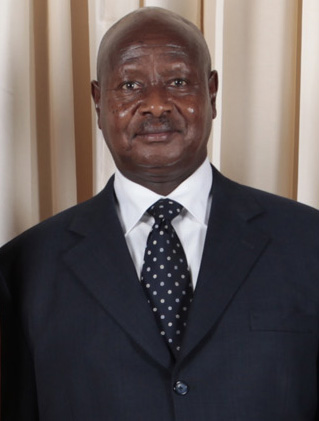

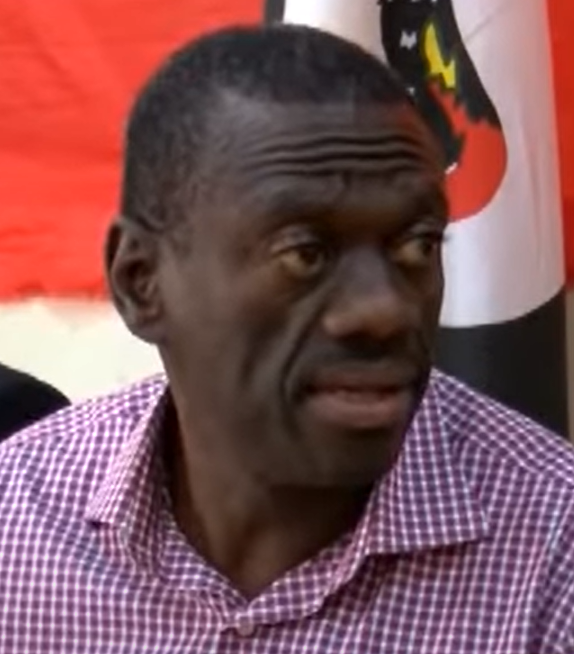
Nominee	Yoweri Museveni	Kizza Besigye
Party	NRM	FDC
Popular vote	4,109,449	2,592,954
Percentage	59.26%	37.39%
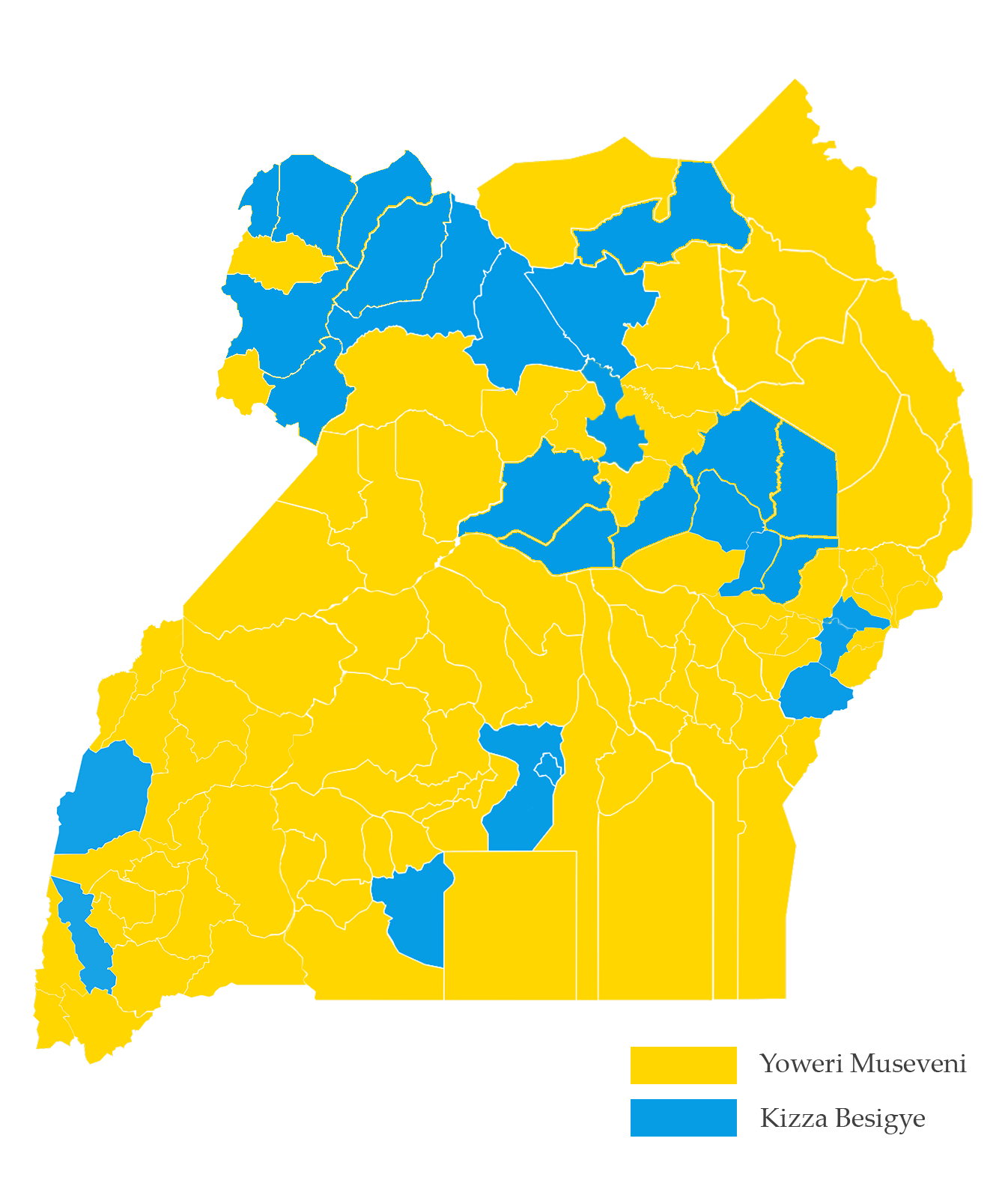
- Museveni: 40–50% 50–60% 60–70% 70–80% 80–90% >90% Besigye: 40–50% 50–60% 60–70% 70–80% 80–90% >90% No Data
President before election
Yoweri Museveni
NRM
Elected President
Yoweri Museveni
NRM
- Parliamentary election
- All 319 seats in Parliament; 160 seats needed for a majority
Party	Leader	Seats
NRM	Yoweri Museveni	213
FDC	Kizza Besigye	37
UPC	Miria Obote	9
DP	John Ssebaana Kizito	8
CP	Ken Lukyamuzi	1
JEEMA	Kibirige Muhamad Mayanja	1
Independents	–	40
This lists parties that won seats. See the complete results below.
Speaker of Parliament before	Speaker of Parliament after
Edward Ssekandi; NRM	Edward Ssekandi; NRM

General elections were held in Uganda on 23 February 2006. They were the first multi-party elections since President Yoweri Museveni took over power in 1986, and followed a referendum the previous year on scrapping the ban on party politics. It was also the first elections where voters elected the President and parliamentary representatives (including special seats for women) on the same day.

Museveni ran for a second re-election as the National Resistance Movement (NRM) candidate. His main opponent was the leader of the Forum for Democratic Change, Kizza Besigye. Besigye was arrested on 14 November 2005 on allegations of treason, concealment of treason, and rape. The treason case included his alleged links to the rebel groups, Lord's Resistance Army and People's Redemption Army, and the rape charge referred to an incident in November 1997 allegedly involving the daughter of a friend. The arrest led to demonstrations and riots in Kampala and towns around the country. Pro-Besigye protesters believed the charges were fabricated to stop Besigye from challenging Museveni.

The result of the presidential election was a victory for Museveni, who received 59 percent of the vote, Besigye took 37 percent. In the parliamentary elections the NRM won 213 of the 319 seats.

== Campaign ==
Justice Forum leader Muhammad Kibirige Mayanja and Conservative Party's Ken Lukyamuzi decided not to contest, but said they would support a joint candidate agreed to by the "Group of Six" opposition political parties. Independent candidate Nasser Sebaggala registered, but later decided to quit the presidential race, and asked his supporters to vote for the DP's Kizito.

== Conduct ==
The elections were marred by controversy, with the government accused of intimidating opposition parties. This included the arrest and detention of Besigye.

== Results ==
=== President ===
Candidate	Party	Votes	%
Yoweri Museveni	National Resistance Movement	4,109,449	59.26
Kizza Besigye	Forum for Democratic Change	2,592,954	37.39
John Ssebaana Kizito	Democratic Party	109,583	1.58
Abed Bwanika	Independent	65,874	0.95
Miria Obote	Uganda People's Congress	57,071	0.82
Total		6,934,931	100.00
Valid votes		6,934,931	95.91
Invalid/blank votes		295,525	4.09
Total votes		7,230,456	100.00
Registered voters/turnout		10,450,788	69.19
Source: Electoral Commission, African Elections Database

==== By district ====
District	Bwanika		Besigye		Obote		Kizito		Museveni		Registered voters
District	Votes	%	Votes	%	Votes	%	Votes	%	Votes	%	Registered voters
Adjumani District	779	2.38	19,919	60.75	165	0.5	648	1.98	11,277	34.39	49,447
Amolatar District	304	1.23	16,462	66.44	440	1.78	460	1.86	7,112	28.7	33,020
Amuria District	1,063	2.46	33,602	77.73	594	1.37	709	1.64	7,260	16.79	65,691
Apac District	3,335	2.1	115,840	72.81	11,019	6.93	3,272	2.06	25,625	16.11	240,639
Arua District	4,435	2.45	103,133	56.95	2,158	1.19	3,941	2.18	67,436	37.24	281,954
Bugiri District	1,091	0.93	39,632	33.88	771	0.66	1,026	0.88	74,457	63.65	177,525
Bukwa District	114	0.66	1,286	7.39	36	0.21	90	0.52	15,865	91.23	23,925
Bundibugyo District	1,102	1.9	10,691	18.41	363	0.63	1,169	2.01	44,735	77.05	89,035
Bushenyi District	1,082	0.47	51,050	22.14	299	0.13	1,212	0.53	176,909	76.73	308,013
Busia District	896	1.19	28,817	38.17	872	1.16	885	1.17	44,020	58.31	111,091
Butaleja District	608	1.26	17,176	35.64	919	1.91	459	0.95	29,026	60.23	69,822
Gulu District	2,406	1.89	104,910	82.37	1,423	1.12	1,793	1.41	16,827	13.21	215,953
Hoima District	663	0.71	14,697	15.77	312	0.33	545	0.58	76,952	82.59	133,384
Ibanda District	198	0.31	6,734	10.52	55	0.09	281	0.44	56,726	88.64	87,951
Iganga District	1,021	0.57	52,459	29.26	729	0.41	1,075	0.6	124,025	69.17	286,740
Isingiro District	322	0.29	14,745	13.33	103	0.09	433	0.39	95,040	85.9	142,507
Jinja District	526	0.53	43,834	44.03	487	0.49	453	0.46	54,259	54.5	163,681
Kaabong District	526	2.18	1,807	7.49	494	2.05	1,001	4.15	20,302	84.14	41,861
Kabale District	547	0.36	34,244	22.79	152	0.1	395	0.26	114,919	76.48	214,840
Kabarole District	438	0.42	14,961	14.42	202	0.19	988	0.95	87,154	84.01	153,042
Kaberamaido District	711	1.59	34,612	77.19	536	1.2	630	1.4	8,351	18.62	60,437
Kalangala District	118	0.87	5,555	41.19	28	0.21	539	4	7,246	53.73	24,200
Kaliro District	227	0.51	4,121	9.2	87	0.19	285	0.64	40,076	89.46	59,288
Kampala District	3,045	0.7	245,004	56.69	1,425	0.33	11,993	2.78	170,688	39.5	764,283
Kamuli District	846	0.61	25,187	18.03	431	0.31	1,016	0.73	112,236	80.33	207,242
Kamwenge District	365	0.39	8,909	9.53	97	0.1	632	0.68	83,436	89.29	127,799
Kanungu District	344	0.49	16,109	22.86	61	0.09	359	0.51	53,600	76.06	96,091
Kapchorwa District	265	0.62	9,296	21.67	80	0.19	112	0.26	33,144	77.26	61,891
Kasese District	1,507	1.12	70,936	52.61	499	0.37	1,598	1.19	60,301	44.72	210,826
Katakwi District	894	2.79	16,845	52.51	435	1.36	963	3	12,940	40.34	45,494
Kayunga District	477	0.59	24,044	29.65	395	0.49	1,030	1.27	55,152	68.01	126,005
Kibaale District	591	0.46	10,577	8.22	453	0.35	1,027	0.8	116,059	90.17	180,770
Kiboga District	358	0.5	11,168	15.52	111	0.15	861	1.2	59,478	82.64	115,852
Kiruhura District	178	0.2	6,282	6.92	100	0.11	168	0.19	84,046	92.59	104,992
Kisoro District	326	0.41	5,175	6.53	164	0.21	669	0.84	72,896	92.01	99,391
Kitgum District	1,588	2.21	54,293	75.47	1,020	1.42	1,478	2.05	13,562	18.85	115,010
Koboko District	1,041	3.58	16,858	57.94	192	0.66	663	2.28	10,343	35.55	48,973
Kotido District	362	1.17	2,694	8.7	273	0.88	788	2.55	26,842	86.7	56,559
Kumi District	2,268	2.05	75,440	68.09	1,083	0.98	1,598	1.44	30,398	27.44	158,510
Kyenjojo District	523	0.48	7,152	6.61	300	0.28	940	0.87	99,291	91.76	150,354
Lira District	3,133	2.07	121,568	80.41	11,516	7.62	2,982	1.97	11,986	7.93	247,272
Luweero District	683	0.73	28,253	30.38	241	0.26	2,394	2.57	61,439	66.06	148,042
Manafwa District	693	0.61	26,935	23.75	470	0.41	609	0.54	84,688	74.68	163,807
Masaka District	1,155	0.54	78,553	36.65	197	0.09	7,856	3.67	126,561	59.05	317,684
Masindi District	1,417	1.19	29,555	24.88	945	0.8	1,403	1.18	85,447	71.95	195,112
Mayuge District	652	0.86	26,183	34.49	623	0.82	642	0.85	47,824	62.99	128,811
Mbale District	620	0.63	47,856	48.37	455	0.46	509	0.51	49,507	50.03	162,767
Mbarara District	339	0.28	28,270	23.05	160	0.13	287	0.23	93,571	76.31	175,401
Mityana District	370	0.48	22,415	28.85	197	0.25	2,894	3.72	51,825	66.7	114,425
Moroto District	735	2.16	2,811	8.28	565	1.66	1,478	4.35	28,363	83.54	63,095
Moyo District	685	2.45	14,901	53.38	306	1.1	414	1.48	11,610	41.59	42,137
Mpigi District	576	0.51	32,285	28.42	272	0.24	4,496	3.96	75,988	66.88	168,103
Mubende District	633	0.49	14,558	11.35	309	0.24	1,560	1.22	111,232	86.7	197,597
Mukono District	1,514	0.71	82,743	38.68	690	0.32	6,134	2.87	122,847	57.42	345,689
Nakapiripirit District	189	0.74	1,390	5.41	146	0.57	310	1.21	23,635	92.07	46,070
Nakaseke District	204	0.46	6,384	14.29	60	0.13	763	1.71	37,260	83.41	63,541
Nakasongola District	164	0.42	3,600	9.15	95	0.24	188	0.48	35,284	89.71	56,502
Nebbi District	2,525	2.13	56,663	47.87	2,733	2.31	2,245	1.9	54,208	45.79	176,766
Ntungamo District	545	0.38	40,283	28.45	169	0.12	538	0.38	100,077	70.67	186,127
Pader District	1,538	2.21	53,921	77.32	674	0.97	1,303	1.87	12,305	17.64	122,802
Pallisa District	1,883	1.22	70,178	45.5	1,086	0.7	2,037	1.32	79,055	51.25	225,241
Rakai District	556	0.4	36,980	26.29	172	0.12	2,248	1.6	100,709	71.59	206,289
Rukungiri District	363	0.42	29,261	34.26	100	0.12	256	0.3	55,436	64.9	122,711
Sironko District	577	0.6	35,855	37.4	239	0.25	518	0.54	58,670	61.2	138,013
Soroti District	1,663	1.59	84,217	80.5	773	0.74	971	0.93	16,993	16.24	149,304
Sembabule District	195	0.33	12,567	21.02	107	0.18	610	1.02	46,320	77.46	85,016
Tororo District	1,476	1.35	56,528	51.68	2,912	2.66	1,094	1	47,374	43.31	164,263
Wakiso District	1,720	0.64	125,306	46.51	555	0.21	13,239	4.91	128,620	47.74	457,962
Yumbe District	1,051	2.26	24,297	52.22	454	0.98	893	1.92	19,832	42.62	76,151
Total	65,344	0.95	2,570,572	37.36	56,584	0.82	109,055	1.59	4,078,677	59.28	10,450,788
Source: Electoral Commission

=== Parliament ===
Party	Constituency			Women			Seats	
Party	Votes	%	Seats	Votes	%	Seats	Appointed	Total
National Resistance Movement			141			58	14	213
Forum for Democratic Change			27			10	0	37
Uganda People's Congress			9			0	0	9
Democratic Party			8			0	0	8
Conservative Party			1			0	0	1
Justice Forum			1			0	0	1
Independents			28			11	1	40
Uganda People's Defence Force							10	10
Total			215			79	25	319
Registered voters/turnout	10,450,788	68		10,450,788	–			
Source: Electoral Commission, IPU

== Aftermath ==
Opposition supporters in Kampala staged some protests but were dispersed by riot police with tear gas. On 6 April 2006 the Supreme Court rejected Besigye's request to dismiss the poll by a vote of four to three, though a majority agreed that there had been electoral irregularities.
