= Apollo Ofwono =

Ugandan politician

Hon. Apollo Yeri Ofwono
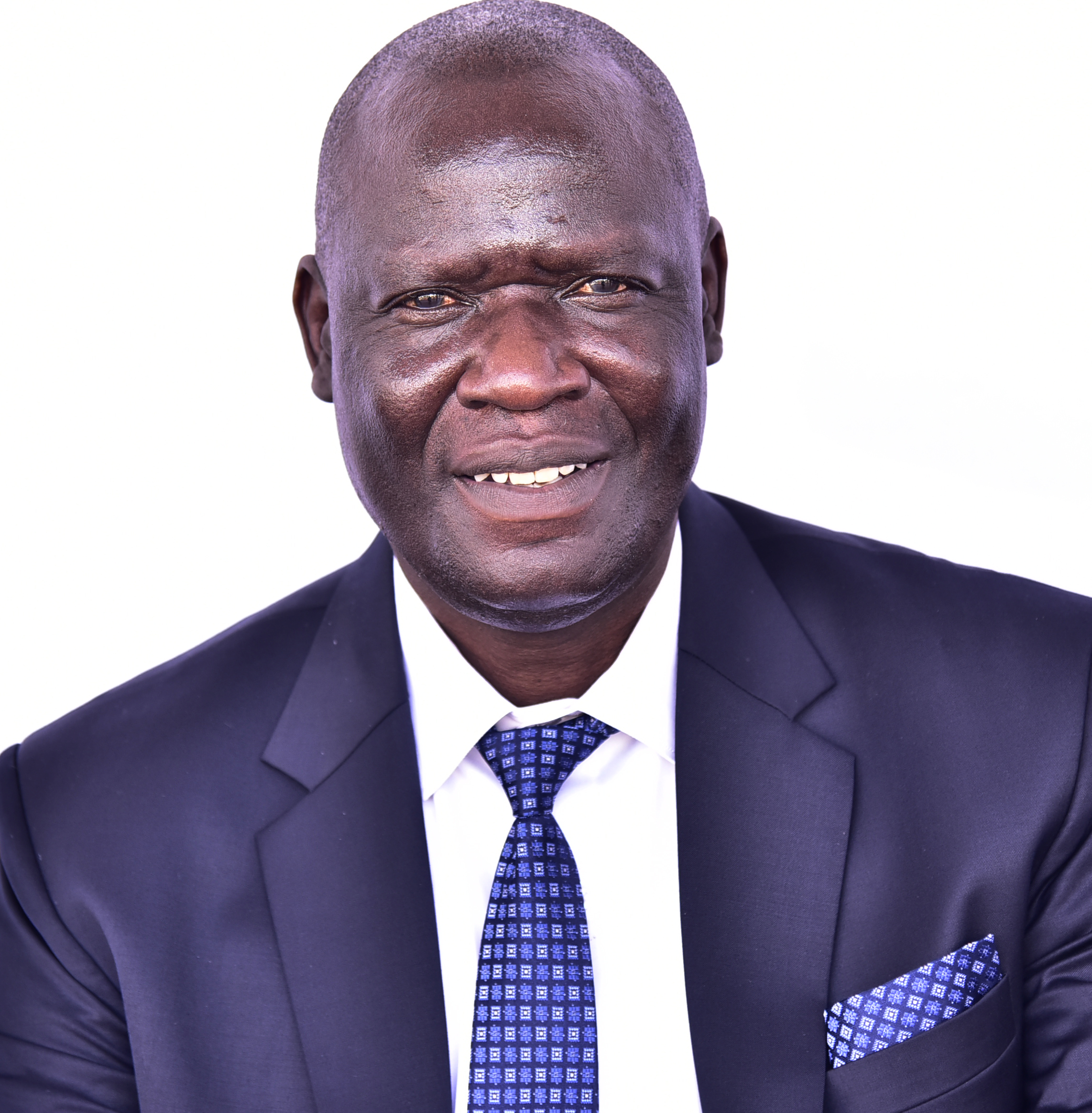

Member of Parliament for Tororo Municipality

Personal details
- Born: April 14, 1962 (age 64) Uganda
- Party: National Resistance Movement
- Education: Makerere University Business School (BCom)
- Occupation: Politician
- Known for: Serving in Parliament; legal dispute over 2006 elections
- Committees: Natural Resources Committee, Appointments Committee

Apollo Yeri Ofwono (born April 14, 1962) is a Ugandan politician and a member of Ugandan parliament representing Tororo Municipality in Tororo District. He was elected to the parliament on the ticket of the National Resistance Movement (NRM). He is a member of the Natural Resources and Appointments committee.

== Life and education ==
Ofwono is a Christian of Anglican denomination. He studied for a bachelor’s degree in Commerce at the Makerere University Business School.

== Political career ==
Ofwono first ran for his Tororo District seat in the Ugandan Parliament in 2006 but lost to incumbent MP Sanjay Tanna. Disatified, Ofwono challenged the result of the poll with allegations that his opponent bribed voters and brought in non-registered voters to vote him. He lost the case in court and was ordered to pay 44 million shillings in court cost. He failed to pay the fine until 2009 when he was arrested on the order of the court.

He contested again in 2016 and won the seat defeating Sanjay Tanna with 7149 votes to 7,045 marking his first successful election to the Parliament of Uganda. Ofwono was re-elected in the 2021 general elections taking the seat among multiple candidates.

== Party Leadership and Local Politics ==
Ofwono also plays a prominent role in the National Resistance Movement's local structures. In Tororo District internal party elections, he has served in leadership positions including as the NRM district chairperson. The party leadership elections have occasionally been contentious with some party members alleging irregularities which Ofwono has publicly denied.

== Controversies and Public Statements ==
Ofwono has generated public discussion for comments on political participation. In one instance, during a community debate, he was quoted saying that individuals need to be financially stable to succeed in parliamentary politics; the statement drew criticism from some opponents.
