= 2000 Ugandan multi-party referendum =

29 June 2000
- Which political system do you wish to adopt, Movement or Multi-party?

Results
Choice	Votes	%
Movement system	4,322,901	90.71%
Multi-party system	442,823	9.29%
Valid votes	4,765,724	96.97%
Invalid or blank votes	148,800	3.03%
Total votes	4,914,524	100.00%
Registered voters/turnout	9,609,703	51.14%

A referendum on restoring multi-party democracy was held in Uganda on 29 June 2000. Voters were asked "Which political system do you wish to adopt, Movement or Multiparty?" The result was 90.7% in support of the non-partisan Movement system with a voter turnout of 51.1%

A second referendum on the subject was held in 2005, with the reverse result.

== Results ==
Choice	Votes	%
Movement	4,322,901	90.69
Multi-party	443,843	9.31
Total	4,766,744	100.00
Valid votes	4,766,744	96.97
Invalid/blank votes	148,800	3.03
Total votes	4,915,544	100.00
Registered voters/turnout	9,609,703	51.15
Source: African Elections Database
