= Miria Obote =

Ugandan politician and former first lady

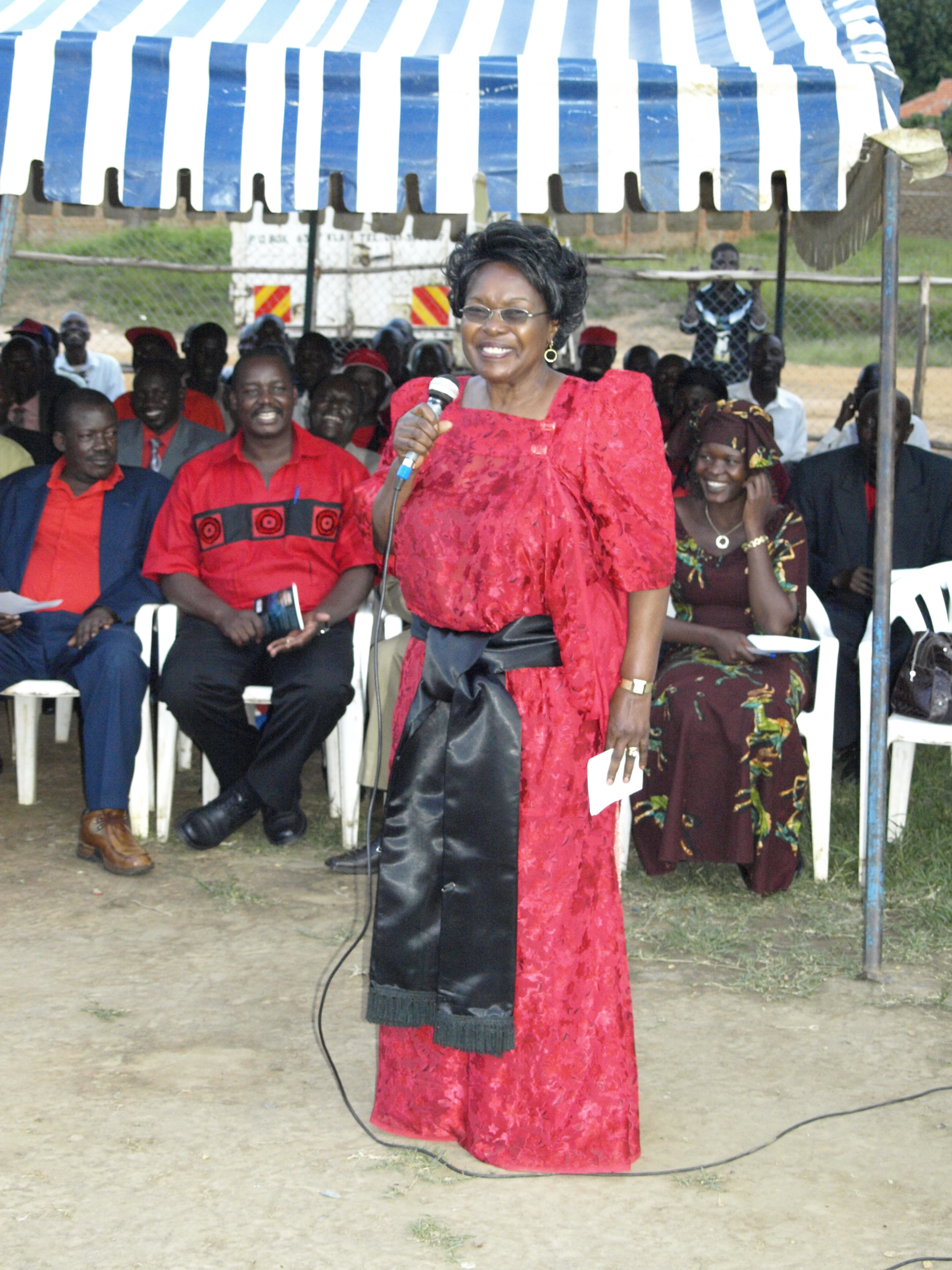

Former First Lady of Uganda
- In office 17 December 1980 – 27 July 1985
- President: Milton Obote
- In office 15 April 1966 – 25 January 1971
- President: Milton Obote
- Succeeded by: Sarah Kyolaba

President of the Uganda People's Congress(UPC)
- In office 28 November 2005 – 14 March 2010
- Preceded by: Milton Obote
- Succeeded by: Olara Otunnu

Personal details
- Born: Miria Kalule; July 16, 1936 (age 90) Kampala, Uganda Protectorate
- Party: Uganda People's Congress(UPC)
- Spouse: Milton Obote (m. 1963; died 2005)
- Children: 4, including Jimmy Akena Obote

Miria Obote (née Kalule; born 16 July 1936) is a Ugandan politician and former First Lady of Uganda. She was First Lady during the two presidencies of her husband, Milton Obote, from 1966 to 1971 and from 1980 to 1985. In November 2005 she was elected president of the Uganda People's Congress (UPC), becoming the first woman to lead a major political party in Uganda. As UPC flag bearer she ran in the 2006 Ugandan general election, receiving 57,071 votes, about 0.8 per cent of the total, and finishing fifth. She is widely known in Uganda as "Mama Miria".

== Early life and education ==
Miria Kalule was born on 16 July 1936 in Kawempe, a suburb of Kampala, then in the Uganda Protectorate. She is a Muganda, the daughter of Bulasio (Blasio) Kisule Kalule, a civil servant in the Department of Road Maintenance in the Ministry of Works, and his wife Malita. Her father was known as a staunch supporter of the Kabaka of Buganda.

Kalule attended Gayaza High School, one of Uganda's oldest girls' schools, and later undertook intermediary studies at Makerere University College. After secretarial training she worked in New York as a secretary with Uganda's delegation to the United Nations.

== Marriage and family ==
Kalule met Apollo Milton Obote in the early 1960s while he was a rising politician and Prime minister of Uganda. Their relationship initially faced opposition from her family because Obote was a Langi and not a Muganda, but she insisted on proceeding with the marriage. The couple married at Namirembe Cathedral in Kampala on 9 November 1963 in a ceremony attended by President Edward Mutesa II.

Miria and Milton Obote had four sons. Their third son, Jimmy Akena Obote, became a Member of Parliament for Lira Municipality and later president of the UPC.

As First lady Miria Obote was noted for her reserved public profile, her fashion sense and her focus on family life and hospitality. She frequently accompanied her husband to political rallies and state functions and occasionally represented him as guest of honour at public events, while avoiding direct involvement in day‑to‑day politics.

== First lady of Uganda ==
When Obote became executive president in April 1966, Miria Obote assumed the role of first lady for the first time. Her position ended in January 1971 when Idi Amin seized power in a military coup.

After the overthrow of Amin in 1979 the Obote family returned from exile. When Obote won the disputed 1980 general election and resumed the presidency in December 1980, Miria Obote again became first lady. During Obote's second administration she continued with mainly ceremonial duties, including charitable work and hosting visitors at State House.

== Exile ==
The Obote family fled Uganda following the 1971 coup. They first went to Kenya, where they were briefly detained and later expelled, before settling in Tanzania and then in Zambia. After Obote was ousted again in the 1985 Ugandan coup d'état, the family returned to exile in Zambia, where they lived for two decades.

Milton Obote died in Johannesburg, South Africa, on 10 October 2005. His body was returned to Uganda for a state funeral and burial in his home village of Akokoro in Apac District. Miria Obote accompanied the remains and decided to resettle in Uganda with her family.

== Uganda People's Congress leadership ==
Soon after her return, UPC leaders persuaded Miria Obote to take a more visible role in party affairs. On 28 November 2005 a delegates' conference at Namboole Stadium elected her president of the UPC, succeeding her late husband. She became the first woman to lead the UPC and one of the first women to head a major political party in Uganda.

The delegates' conference also endorsed her as the party's presidential flag bearer for the 2006 general election. UPC's choice of Miria Obote was widely interpreted as an attempt to rally support around Obote's legacy and unify competing factions inside the party.

== 2006 presidential campaign ==
On 15 December 2005 Miria Obote was officially nominated as a candidate for the 2006 presidential election by the Electoral Commission of Uganda. Her nomination made her the first woman to run for the presidency on behalf of a major political party in Uganda.

During the campaign she toured much of the country, promising restoration of multiparty democracy, improved public services and national reconciliation. In February 2006 she visited Mengo, the seat of the Buganda Kingdom, where she delivered a formal apology on behalf of her husband's government for the 1966 attack on the palace. The Buganda officials present accepted her apology, describing the meeting as cordial and constructive.

In the presidential poll held on 23 February 2006 she finished fifth among five candidates, winning 57,071 votes (0.82 per cent) according to the official results. Although the UPC retained some parliamentary representation, the result confirmed the party's diminished national support.

Miria Obote remained UPC president until March 2010, when former UN diplomat Olara Otunnu was elected to succeed her at a party delegates' conference in Kampala.

== Later life ==
After stepping down from UPC leadership, Obote stayed largely out of frontline politics, occasionally appearing at party and national events. In November 2018 her son Jimmy Akena announced that she had been admitted to Kampala Hospital with a chest infection and was being monitored in a high dependency unit.

Obote has remained an important symbolic figure for the UPC and the Obote family legacy. In July 2024 The Observer highlighted her long‑standing friendship with fellow former first ladies Maria Nyerere of Tanzania and Mama Ngina Kenyatta of Kenya, describing how the three women supported one another through periods of exile and widowhood. In October 2025, speaking at a memorial service for Milton Obote in Akokoro, Apac District, she urged UPC leaders and supporters "never to let the party die" and thanked them for their continued solidarity with her family.

== Legacy ==
Miria Obote is frequently portrayed as a bridge figure between Uganda's independence generation and later multiparty politics. Commentators have noted her role in sustaining the UPC during a period of internal division and declining electoral strength, as well as her contribution to normalising women's participation in high‑level party leadership and presidential contests in Uganda.

== See also ==
- Milton Obote
- Uganda People's Congress
- First Lady of Uganda
- Politics of Uganda
