= People's Redemption Army =

Rebel Group

People's Redemption Army (PRA) is a Ugandan rebel group whose existence is disputed. The Government of Uganda has asserted its existence for several years, although it has occasionally called the rebel group "dormant". The rebel group is allegedly based in the eastern Democratic Republic of the Congo (DRC Congo), founded by renegade Ugandan army officers, and estimated (in 2004) to consist of around 2,000 rebels. In December 2004, Ugandan army deployed troops along the border with DRC Congo, saying that the rebel group was preparing to attack Uganda.

The leader of the main opposition party Forum for Democratic Change (FDC) and the main contender for the presidency in the 2006 Elections, Kizza Besigye, was arrested on November 14, 2005, accused of being the "political leader of the PRA", sparking demonstrations and violent riots in his support. Besigye denied any links with PRA, and accused the government of conjuring up the rebel group.

On November 9, 2005, the UN Special Representative to Democratic Republic of the Congo, William Lacy Swing, implicated PRA as one of the foreign armed groups operating in eastern DRC Congo. FDC then petitioned the UN, protesting the statement. An FDC representative said, "The statement by Swing, which alleges the existence of a shadowy rebel movement, has caused consternation and widespread concern, even antipathy towards the United Nations, among the people of Uganda," and added that "Specifically, the people of Uganda would like to know the strength, location, leadership and financiers of the PRA, if in fact such a group does exist".

A Uganda army spokesman said on November 16, 2005 that the army was deployed to help the police with the riots that followed Kizza Besigye's arrest, and that security had been increased at all borders because "We know PRA exists and are likely to attack".

In April 2006, the Rwandan president, Paul Kagame, said that a lot has been talked about the PRA and its links with Rwanda, but that the PRA is fictitious and the creation of the Ugandan government.
