= People's Progressive Party (Uganda) =

Political party in Uganda

People's Progressive Party chama cha maendeleo ya watu
- Abbreviation: PPP
- President: Mr. George Willam Magera
- Chairperson: Mr. Sadam Gayira
- General Secretary: Mr. David Alira
- Founder: Mr. Jaberi Bidandi Ssali
- Founded: 2004
- Ideology: Democratic socialism Labourism; Left-wing populism Liberal socialism Progressivism; Social democracy
- Political position: Centre-left to left-wing
- National Assembly of Uganda: 1 / 529

Website
- www.ppp-uganda.com

The People's Progressive Party (PPP) is a political party in Uganda founded in 2004 by Jaberi Bidandi Ssali. It had first the name of National Progressive Movement (NPM) before becoming PPP in December 2005. Its motto is "Together in progress", while its symbol is a lamp alight in the centre of the map of Uganda with the inscription PPP within the map. Its colours are red, orange, blue and white.

The Current President of People's Progressive party is Mr. George William Magera, voted into this position On Friday, September 22, 2017. Other leaders include Mr. Sadam Gayira as the Party Chairman, and Mr. David Alira Poii as the General Secretary.

== Current Leadership ==
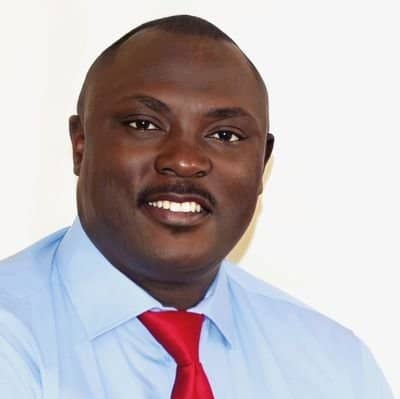
Mr. George William Magera [Party President]

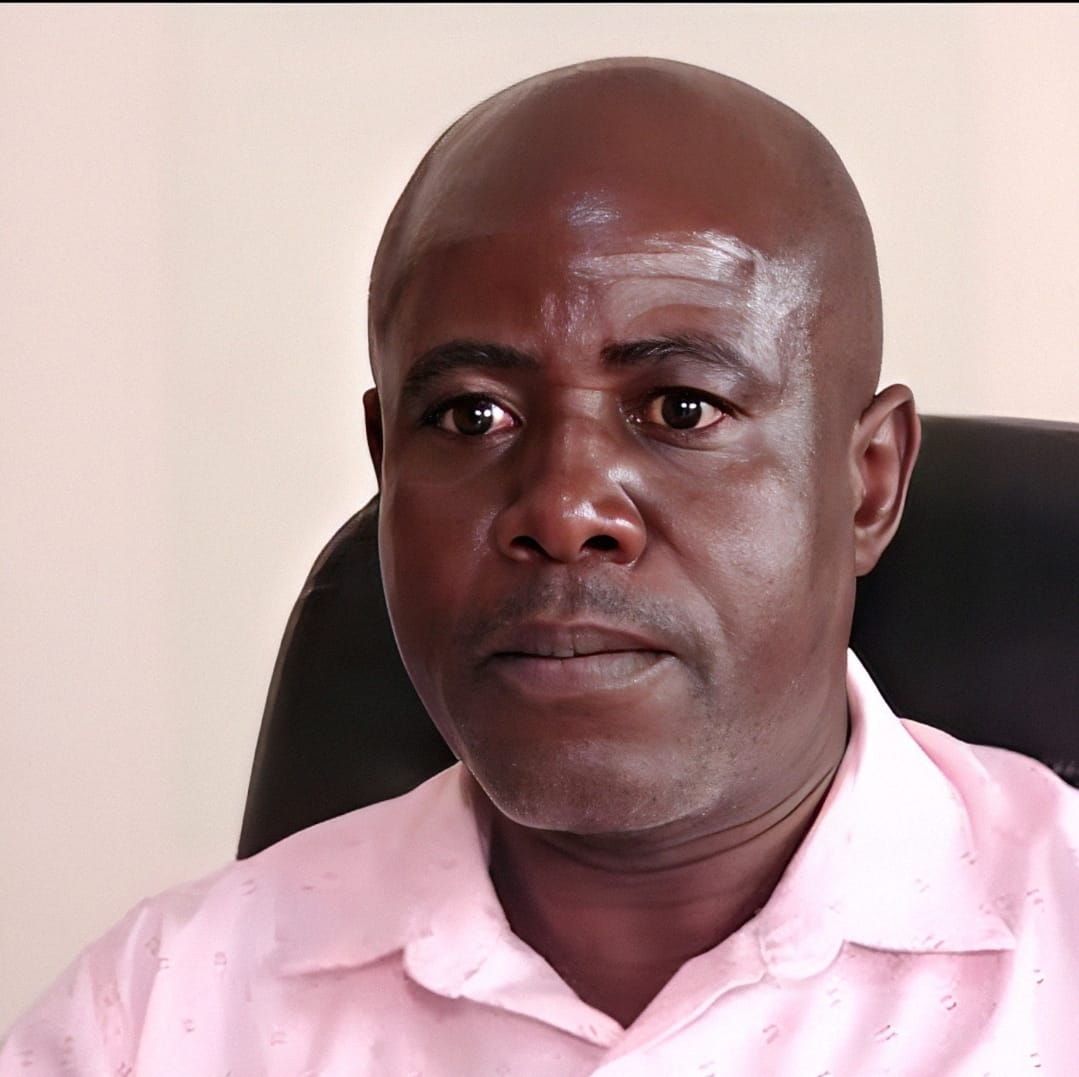
Mr. Sadam Gayira [Party Chairman]

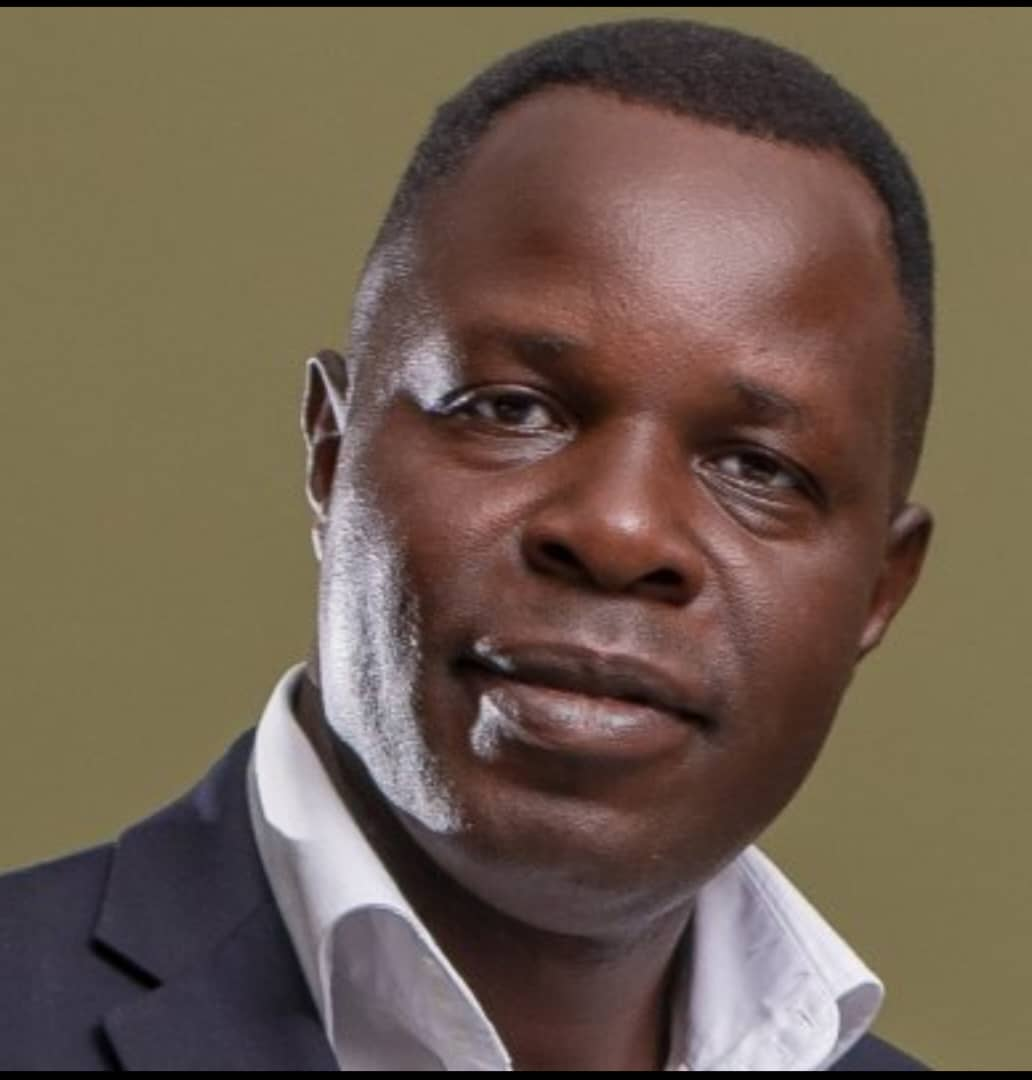
Mr. David Alira [Party Secretary]

== Ideology ==
The birth of PPP was based on the realization of the sectarian and untenable premises on which political organizations in the country had been formed and managed, leading to political instability, balkanization, factionalism and marginalization. The founder members of PPP believed that for a party to be entrusted with the governance of the country, it must be well organized internally and institutionalized. This can be done by building a strong ideological base, structures/organs and provision of alternative policy platform for the governance of the country. Founder members further believed that a party that can be entrusted with the life of a country must respect and uphold democratic principles such as transparency, accountability, inclusiveness, and respect for institutions, laws, human rights and other liberties. Such a party must also take into account Uganda’s violent past and thus forge unity and reconciliation and cultivate a culture of peaceful resolution of political disagreements.

Therefore, the founder members of PPP envisioned a Uganda that is not only strong and united but also well governed, democratic, peaceful, just and prosperous. All these are encapsulated in the mission, character, values as well as objectives of the party. It needs to be noted that as the party changed its name from NPM to PPP, it also amended various articles of the constitution. The new constitution was eventually adopted as a guiding document for the party in the 2008 Delegates’ Conference.

In pursuance of its mission and to realize its vision, People’s Progressive Party is guided by four main principles and/or values:

- Peacefulness
- Non confrontation in solving political impasse
- Non violent approach to political development
- Mentoring young people in political leadership

Article 7 of the PPP constitution defines the character of the party as:

- Democratic
- Non Sectarian
- Pro-people
- Progressive

== Structure ==
Over the years, the party has done mobilization throughout Uganda, recruited nearly 100,000 members and instituted party structures in many parts of the country. The party held its first ever delegates’ conference in June 2008. The conference was attended by about 1500 delegates from 40 districts. The main mandate of the conference was to elect party leaders. Indeed, party leaders were elected and this included the election of leaders of women and youth leagues as well as leaders of the wings of persons with disabilities and the elderly. The election and constitution of the party leadership consequently gave the party the gravitas to contest in the general election of February 2011. The party fielded a presidential candidate, 32 parliamentary candidates, one LCV candidate and nearly 200 candidates for the lower local government positions. Of these candidates, the party succeeded in getting one LCIII chairman, sub-county and parish councilors, elected. The other success that the party registered during the campaigns was introducing PPP to the whole country and establishing contacts for continued mobilization across the country.
