= Olive Kobusingye =

Ugandan trauma surgeon (born 1962)

- Born: 1962 (age 63–64); Uganda
- Education: Makerere University (MB ChB); Makerere University (MMed); London School of Hygiene and Tropical Medicine (MSc); State University of New York at Albany (MPH)
- Occupations: Trauma Surgeon; Emergency Physician; Accident Injury Epidemiologist
- Years active: 1996 — present
- Title: Senior Research Fellow at Makerere University School of Public Health and the Institute for Social and Health Sciences of the University of South Africa.

Olive Chifefe Kobusingye is a Ugandan consultant trauma surgeon, emergency surgeon, accident injury epidemiologist and academic, who serves as a Senior Research Fellow at both Makerere University School of Public Health and the Institute for Social and Health Sciences of the University of South Africa. She heads the Trauma, Injury, & Disability (TRIAD) Project at Makerere University School of Public Health, where she coordinates the TRIAD graduate courses.

== Background and education ==
Kobusingye was born in Uganda in the 1960s. She attended local elementary and secondary schools. In 1982, she was admitted to Makerere University School of Medicine, graduating with a Bachelor of Medicine and Bachelor of Surgery degree in 1987. She continued with her studies at the London School of Hygiene and Tropical Medicine, graduating with a Master of Science degree in 1991.

Two years after that, she graduated with a Master of Medicine degree in General Surgery, from Makerere University School of Medicine. She followed that with a Master of Public Health degree, majoring in Epidemiology, obtained from the State University of New York at Albany in 1995.

== Career ==
Olive Kobusingye was the founding executive director of the Injury Control Center, at Makerere Medical School in Kampala, Uganda. She has experience in the design and implementation of injury surveillance systems in low income settings. She was also the founding Secretary General of the Injury Prevention Initiative for Africa. She established the first hospital trauma registries in Sub-Saharan Africa. She is also Chair of the International Network for Clinical Epidemiology (INCLEN) Africa Injury Research Cluster, consisting of researchers from four African countries.

Before joining Makerere University School of Public Health Olive worked as Regional Advisor on Violence, Injuries, and Disabilities at the World Health Organization’s regional office for Africa (AFRO), based in Brazzaville, Republic of the Congo. She also previously served as a lecturer, in the Department of Surgery at Makerere University and as an emergency and trauma surgeon at Mulago National Referral Hospital, the largest referral hospital in Uganda.

== Research ==
As of April 2019, Kobusingye has been cited 17,489 times. She is an expert on the design and implementation of injury surveillance systems in low income settings, and on designing interventions for the prevention of traffic injuries.

Kobusingye is a contributing author to Disease Control Priorities 3 (DCP3), having edited the volume about Injury Prevention and Environmental Health and authored the chapters on "Universal Health Coverage and Intersectoral Action for Health" and "Key Messages from Disease Control Priorities, Third Edition."

Kobusingye developed the Kampala Trauma Score (KTS) in 2000, specifically designed for use in low-resource, low-income settings of LMICs, after establishing a hospital-based trauma registry that generated relevant and timely data on the causes, severity, morbidity, mortality, and outcomes of injuries in Mulago Hospital. Her KTS has since been validated and modified by other researchers, creating the M-KTS (modified-Kampala Trauma Score), which excludes respiratory rate from the calculation.

== Family ==
Kobusingye is a mother of two girls. She is a younger sister to opposition politician Dr. Colonel (Retired) Warren Kiiza Besigye Kifefe, a four-time presidential candidate and former president of the Forum for Democratic Change political party.

== Other considerations ==
Kobusingye's research interests include injury surveillance, emergency trauma care systems, injury severity measurement, road safety, and drowning. She has served on the Core Advisory Group of the World Bank’s Global Road Safety Facility. She is the Chairperson of the Road Traffic Injuries Research Network (RTIRN)

== See also ==
- John Omagino
- Mulago National Referral Hospital
