= Justina Geraldine Najjuka =

Ugandan plastic surgeon, author and Catholic nun

Sr. Dr. Justina Liliana Lucy Geraldine Najjuka
- Born: Justina Liliana Lucy Geraldine Najjuka; Mukono, Uganda
- Other name: Geraldine Najjuka
- Education: Makerere University; Uganda Martyrs University
- Occupations: Doctor, Author, Nun
- Known for: Cleft palate reconstructive surgery, paediatric nutrition

Sr. Dr. Justina Geraldine Najjuka (referred to as Sister Doctor Justina Liliana Lucy Geraldine Najjuka) is a Ugandan religious sister, author and plastic surgeon. She was the first African Roman Catholic nun to become a surgeon in East and Central Africa.

== Background and education ==
Najjuka was the first of 25 children born to Eli Canaan Sserwanga, a land surveyor, and Maria Hellena Namazzi, a teacher and one of the founders of Uganda Martyrs Secondary School Namugongo.

In 1970, Najjuka joined the Little Sisters of St. Francis, Nkokonjeru Convent, and on 21 December 1975, she professed to be a nun. Continuing with her studies, she sat for O Level exams in 1980 at Saint Joseph’s Girls School, Nsambya and later joined Mount Saint Mary's College, Namagunga for her A Levels.

Upon graduating from Makerere University in 1988 with a Bachelor of Medicine and Surgery, Najjuka became the first African Roman Catholic nun to become a surgeon in East and Central Africa. She offered her internship at Rubaga hospital.

She also trained at the Sri Ramachandra College in India in 1996 and specialised in plastic and reconstructive surgery. From Uganda Martyrs University, Nkozi, Najjuka has a Master in Health Service Management.

== Career ==
=== Medical ===
Having offered internship at Rubaga Hospital, Najjuka served as the Medical Superintendent of St. Francis Hospital Nkokonjeru. She was there for seven years after which she left to go back to school. She then worked in civil service at Rubaga Hospital, and later as a Medical Officer at Tororo Hospital. She was transferred to Nsambya Hospital as a general surgeon then Head of its Surgery Department. She also served as a plastic surgeon and Head of Department (Plastics and Reconstructive Surgery) at the Mbarara Regional Referral Hospital.

Professionally, Najjuka is a member of the Association of Surgeons of Uganda and has been recognised so. She is also a "Fellow of the College of Surgeons, East Central and Southern Africa" and a "Fellow of the International College of Surgeons".

=== Retirement ===
In 2007, Najjuka became a partner with a non-governmental organisation, Smile Train.

The organisation's website reports that as of 2022, she is currently the "Head of Surgical Centre Smile Train Mbarara (SCSTM) at the Good Samaritan Village Helpers Centre in Uganda". Under the organisation, Najjuka performs cleft surgeries as well as "providing nutritional support to babies who are too underweight to receive cleft surgery safely".

=== Other ===
Najjuka occasionally presents on a local radio station, Radio Sapientia, on health-related matters and is a Rotarian.

== See also ==
- St. Francis Hospital Nkokonjeru
- Cleft lip and cleft palate
- Catholic Church in Uganda
- Maura Lynch
