= List of legislators educated at the United States Naval Academy =

Seal of the United States Congress

Over 20 graduates of the United States Naval Academy (USNA) have served as members of the United States Congress as legislators in the United States Senate or United States House of Representatives or in their home nation. The Naval Academy is an undergraduate college in Annapolis, Maryland, with the mission of educating and commissioning officers for the Navy and Marine Corps. The Academy is often referred to as Annapolis, while sports media refer to the Academy as "Navy" and the students as "Midshipmen"; this usage is officially endorsed. During the latter half of the 19th century and the first decades of the 20th, the United States Naval Academy was the primary source of U.S. Navy and Marine Corps officers, with the Class of 1881 being the first to provide officers to the Marine Corps. Graduates of the Academy are also given the option of entering the United States Army or United States Air Force. Most Midshipmen are admitted through the congressional appointment system. The curriculum emphasizes various fields of engineering.

This list is drawn from graduates of the Naval Academy who became members of Congress or its equivalent in their native country. The Academy was founded in 1845 and graduated its first class in 1846. The first alumnus to graduate and go on to become a member of Congress was John Buchanan Robinson, who graduated from the Class of 1868. As of March 2009, three alumni are members of Congress: Senator John McCain (class of 1958), Senator James H. Webb, Jr. (class of 1968), and Representative Joe Sestak (class of 1974). Roilo Golez (class of 1970) served as a Congressman in his native country, the Philippines.

Over 990 noted scholars from a variety of academic fields are Academy graduates, including 45 Rhodes Scholars and 16 Marshall Scholars. Additional notable graduates include one President of the United States, two Nobel Prize recipients, 52 astronauts and 73 Medal of Honor recipients.

== Legislators ==
"Class year" refers to the alumni's class year, which usually is the same year they graduated. However, in times of war, classes often graduate early. For example, the Class of 1943 actually graduated in 1942.

Name	Class year	Notability	References
John Buchanan Robinson	1868	Representative from Pennsylvania (1897–1897)	
Oliver Hazard Perry Belmont	1880	Representative from New York (1901–1903)	
John W. Weeks	1881	Representative from Massachusetts (1905–1913); Senator from Massachusetts (1913–1919)	
Ovington Weller	1881	Senator from Maryland (1921–1927)	
Robert B. Howell	1885	Senator from Nebraska (1922–1933)	
Richmond Pearson Hobson	1889	Admiral; Representative from Alabama (1907–1915); recipient of the Medal of Honor for attempting to block a channel during the Spanish–American War, was taken prisoner	
Thomas C. Hart	1897	Admiral; Senator from Connecticut (1945–1946); veteran on the Spanish–American War, World War I, and World War II; commander of United States Asiatic Fleet at the outbreak of World War II; instructor at the Academy	
Victor S. K. Houston	1897	Representative from Hawaii (1927–1933)	
Willis W. Bradley	1907	Captain; Governor of Guam (1929–1931); Representative from California (1947–1949); Medal of Honor recipient for actions during an ammunition explosion on board USS Pittsburgh (CA-4) in 1917	
Samuel Wilder King	1910	Representative from Hawaii (1935–1943); 11th Territorial Governor of Hawai'i (1953–1957)	
Edouard Izac	1915	Representative from California (1937–1947); World War I Medal of Honor recipient; held as a prisoner of war onboard a German submarine and in Germany, but escaped	
George W. Grider	1936	Captain; Representative from Tennessee (1965–1967); World War II submariner, commanding officer of USS Flasher (SS-249) and USS Cubera (SS-347)	
William Anderson	1943	Representative from Tennessee (1965–1973); World War II submariner; second commanding officer of the Navy's first operating nuclear submarine USS Nautilus (SSN-571)	
Jeremiah Denton	1947	Rear Admiral; Senator from Alabama (1981–1987); naval aviator who spent almost 8 years as a prisoner of war in North Vietnam	
Peter N. Kyros	1947	Representative from Maine (1967–1975)	
Thomas C. McGrath, Jr.	1950	Representative from New Jersey (1965–1967)	
Charles Wilson	1956	Representative from Texas (1973–1996); convinced Congress to support the largest ever CIA covert operation to supply the Afghan Mujahideen during the Soviet–Afghan War; profiled in the book and film Charlie Wilson's War	
John McCain	1958	Captain; U.S. Senator from Arizona (1987–2018); Republican Presidential Nominee in 2008; Vietnam-era Naval Aviator and POW	
James H. Webb, Jr.	1968	Senator from Virginia (2006–2013); Marine Corps officer and Vietnam veteran; United States Assistant Secretary of Defense for Reserve Affairs (1984–1987); Secretary of the Navy (1987–88); noted American novelist for books such as Fields of Fire	
Roilo Golez	1970	Congressman of the Philippines on his sixth term; former National Security Adviser (2001–2004), former Postmaster General (1981–1986)	
Ronald K. Machtley	1970	Representative from Rhode Island (1987–1995); president of Bryant University (1996–)	
Joseph Sestak	1974	Vice Admiral; Representative from Pennsylvania (2007–present); highest-ranking former military officer to serve in Congress	
Eric J. J. Massa	1981	Representative from New York (2009–2010)	
Chip Cravaak	1981	Representative from Minnesota (2011–2013)	
Mikie Sherrill	1994	Representative from New Jersey's 11th district (2019–present)	
Todd Young	1995	Representative from Indiana (2011–2017); Senator from Indiana (2017–present)	
Elaine Luria	1997	Commander; Representative from Virginia's 2nd district (2019–present)	

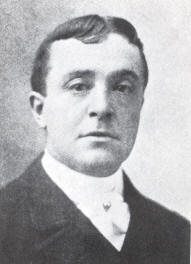
Oliver Belmont

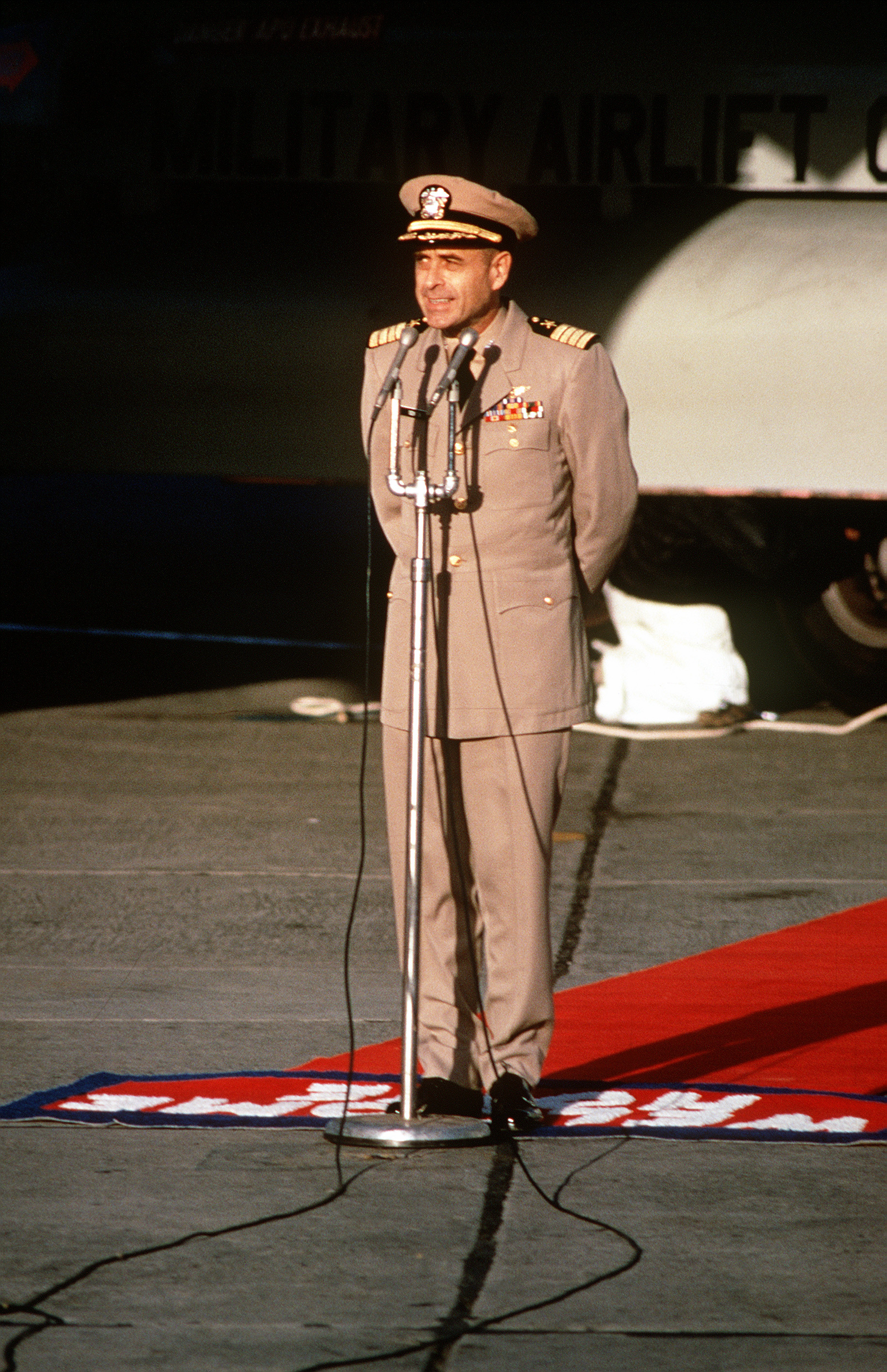
Jeremiah Denton upon his return from being a POW

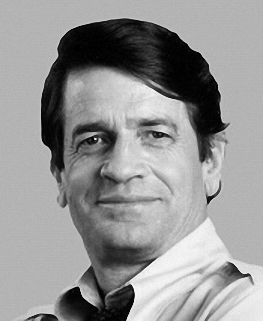
Charlie Wilson

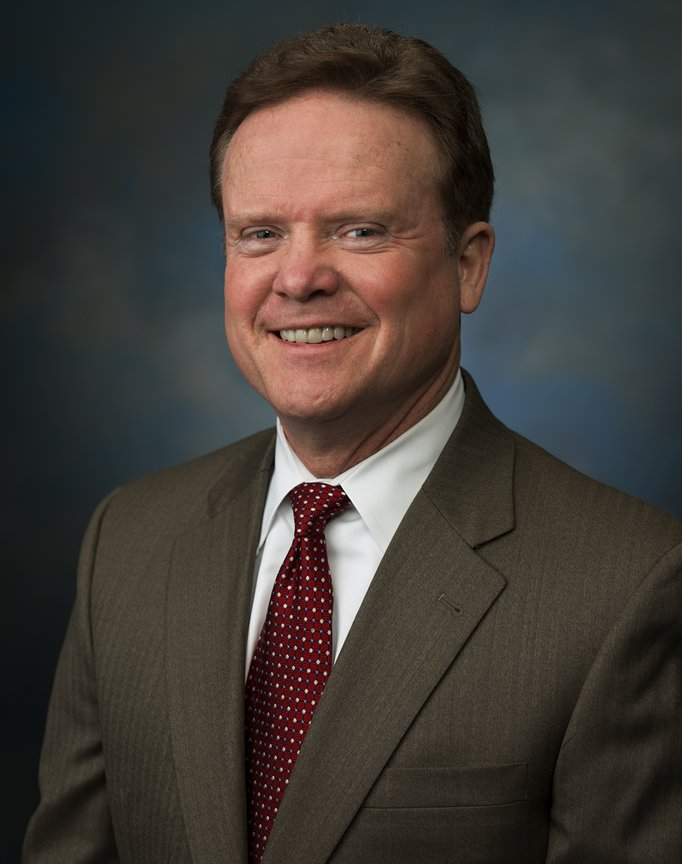
Jim Webb
