= 2005 Ugandan multi-party referendum =

28 July 2005
- Do you agree to open up the political space to allow those who wish to join different organisations/parties to do so to compete for political power?

Results
Choice	Votes	%
Yes	3,643,223	92.44%
No	297,865	7.56%
Valid votes	3,941,088	97.69%
Invalid or blank votes	93,144	2.31%
Total votes	4,034,232	100.00%
Registered voters/turnout	8,524,230	47.33%

A referendum on restoring multi-party politics was held in Uganda on 28 July 2005. Political parties had been banned from competing in elections for nearly 20 years in order to curb sectarian tensions. President Yoweri Museveni instituted the non-party "Movement" system of government when he came to power in 1986. A referendum was held in 2000, but the proposal was rejected by over 90% of voters. This time it was approved by over 90% of voters.

== Background ==
The Ugandan Parliament voted to conduct the referendum on 4 May 2005. Enthusiasm for the poll was muted, however, as both the government and opposition supported a return to a multiparty system. Some political groupings, including the Forum for Democratic Change, boycotted the poll, claiming that it would legitimise 19 years of rule by an effective one-party state. President Museveni castigated the boycotters for "not contributing to the development of Uganda". Other observers suggested the $12.5m spent on the referendum might have been put to better use elsewhere in Uganda, one of the poorest countries in the world.

The lengthy question presented to voters on their ballots was criticised for being confusing: "Do you agree to open up the political space to allow those who wish to join different organisations/parties to do so to compete for political power?" Symbols of a tree and a house accompanied the 'yes' and 'no' boxes, respectively, on the ballot.

More than 90% of voters backed the return to multi-party politics. Some observers expressed surprise at the official figures given for voter turnout. Initial estimates indicated that less than 30% of Uganda's 8.5 million voters had turned out for the poll. The Electoral Commission, however, released an official figure of 47%. A low turnout would have been embarrassing for Museveni.

== Results ==
Do you agree to open up the political space to allow those who wish to join different organisations/ parties to do so to compete for political power?

Choice	Votes	%
For	3,643,223	92.44
Against	297,865	7.56
Total	3,941,088	100.00
Valid votes	3,941,088	97.69
Invalid/blank votes	93,144	2.31
Total votes	4,034,232	100.00
Registered voters/turnout	8,524,230	47.33
Source: IFES
