= Kibirige Mayanja =

Ugandan politician

Muhammad Kibirige Mayanja is a Ugandan politician who founded and served as the first president of the Justice Forum party in Uganda.He was a prominent opposition presidential candidate in the 1990s. His first attempt at politics was in 1994 when he contested for a Constituent Assembly (CA) seat in Kawempe North constituency, where he finished in second position. In 1996, the then little-known Kibirige Mayanja took the country by surprise when he rose up to challenge President Yoweri Museveni for the country's presidency . True to his promise, he traversed the country in a three-man presidential bid, putting up a spirited campaign to the end of the race in which he obtained at least 2.5 percent of the valid votes cast, and finishing behind the leading two candidates, Yoweri K. Museveni and Ssemwogerere Paul Kawanga. A director of planning and development at Makerere University at the time, Mayanja returned to his university job, and laid new strategies for recruiting supporters to his newly found party, Justice Forum, famously called JEEMA by most Ugandans. He bounced back in the presidential race in 2001, which attracted a double number of candidates than the earlier one of 1996. In the 2001 elections, he completed in the fourth position. Ugandan presidency .

Given his background and the ability to challenge the present leadership, Mayanja wanted to inspire many Ugandans at all levels who were hitherto political spectators to stand up to the challenge. He brought several youths into his Justice Forum party. Two of these eloquent youths Asuman Basalirwa and Yususf Kiranda became guild presidents at Makerere University, under his party sponsorship. After 14 years of steering the young party, Kibirige stepped down, handing over the party leadership to the youthful Asuman Basalirwa in 2005. Before working for Makerere University, where he spent ten years as a planner, he had worked with the Ministry of Education for twelve years. He is now the chairman of Justice Forum (JEEMA), and a consultant in the East African region under a private company called Alphabeta project consultants, for which he is the chief executive officer.

== Quits JEEMA for NUP ==
Kibirige in a dramatic political shift, the founding chairperson of the Justice Forum(JEEMA) and a former presidential candidate in the 1996 and 2001 elections, officially ditched the party that he had built nearly for three decades. On 24 September 2025, Mayanja, during the Robert Kyagulanyi Sentamu's post-nomination rally in Kampala, announced that he had become a full member of the National Unity Platform (NUP). His declaration shocked many as he was also spotted seated close to Barbie Itungo, Kyagulanyis' wife which sparked speculations until he personally addressed the gathering. "Iam not leaving my Political Party JEEMA because I hate it, but because those we trusted to lead it forward have failed. For 30 years, JEEMA has struggled without growth. As its founder, I pressed the exit button and chose to walk with NUP, where I see real hope for Change." Kibirige Said. however, he showed they had had private agreements with Robert Kyagulanyi Sentamu and openly revealed that the NUP leader had promised him the position of Prime minister of the NUP government in future. "I believe if we work together, we shall reach the Uganda we want. I have no time to wait let me begin the journey today," he added. Mayanjas' move marks a vital political realignment ahead of the 2026 general elections which raises questions about JEEMAs' future.
