= Jimmy Akena Obote =

Ugandan politician (born 1967)

James Michael Jimmy Akena
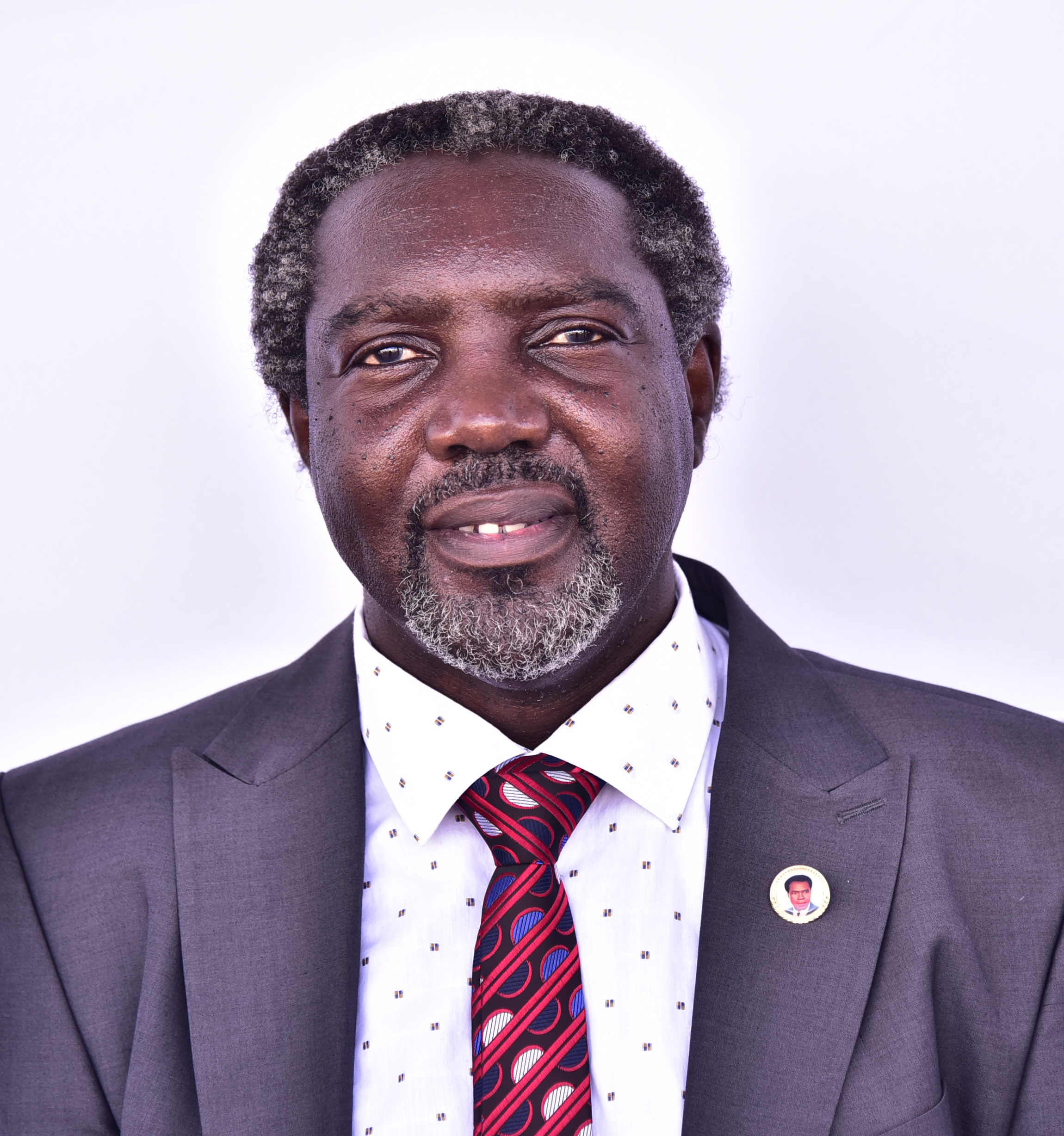

Member of Parliament for Lira East Division
- Incumbent
- Assumed office 2006

Personal details
- Born: 25 September 1967 (age 59) Mulago Hospital, Kampala, Uganda
- Party: Uganda People's Congress (UPC)
- Spouse: Betty Amongi (m. 2013)
- Parent(s): Apollo Milton Obote (father); Miria Kalule Obote (mother)
- Occupation: Politician

James Michael Jimmy Akena (born 25 September 1967), commonly known as Jimmy Akena Obote, is a Ugandan politician and legislator. He is a Member of Parliament representing Lira East Division in Lira City. He leads the Uganda People's Congress (UPC).

== Early life ==
Akena was born on 25 September 1967 at Mulago Hospital in Kampala. Following the 1971 coup in Uganda, he lived in exile with his family, including a period in Tanzania (1971–1980). He later lived in Zambia after 1986, and returned to Uganda in the mid-2000s.

He attended Namasagali College, completed General Certificate of Education (GCE) studies through the University of London, and undertaken professional training through the Kenya Institute of Bankers.

Following Idi Amin's coup d’état in 1971, Akena fled to Tanzania with his father where he spent nine years in exile, from 1971 to 1980. He returned to Uganda in 1980 after Obote overthrew Idi Amin. However, following Museveni’s rise to power in 1986, Akena went back into exile, this time in Zambia. He lived there with his father until 2005, when his father died and was brought back to be buried in Lango, northern Uganda, his birthplace.

== Career ==
=== Business and early work ===
Akena has been described in press profiles as having worked as an accountant with Agromed in Kenya and Zambia in the early 1990s.

=== Parliament ===
Akena entered Parliament after winning the Lira Municipality parliamentary seat in the 2006 elections, defeating incumbent Cecilia Ogwal, according to contemporaneous reporting. Parliamentary records list him as the Member of Parliament for Lira East Division, Lira City, on the UPC ticket. Committee membership lists published by Parliament include him on:

- The Committee on National Economy (January 2024 – May 2026)
- The Committee on Environment and Natural Resources (July 2024 to date)

=== Uganda People’s Congress ===
On 1 July 2015, New Vision reported Akena’s swearing-in as UPC president at a delegates’ conference held at the UMA Showground, Lugogo, Kampala. Parliament’s website later referred to him as “UPC Party President” in a 2023 parliamentary event report.

== Other roles ==
Parliament’s news coverage has described Akena as President of the Federation of Uganda Motorsport.

== Personal life ==
Akena is married to Betty Amongi, a Ugandan politician and cabinet minister, according to press reporting and parliamentary records identifying his marital status.

== See also ==
- Uganda People’s Congress
- Milton Obote
- Betty Amongi
- Parliament of Uganda
- Lira City
