= National Resistance Movement =

Political party in Uganda

National Resistance Movement Harakati za Upinzani za Kitaifa
- Abbreviation: NRM
- Chairman: Yoweri Museveni
- Secretary-General: Richard Todwong
- Founder: Yoweri Museveni
- Founded: 1986; 40 years ago
- Preceded by: Uganda Patriotic Movement
- Headquarters: Kampala
- Armed Wing: National Resistance Army (1981–1995)
- Ideology: National conservatism; Pan-Africanism; Right-wing populism; Neoliberalism; Anti-LGBTQ; Historical: Socialism; Maoism; Marxism
- Political position: Right-wing to far-right Historical: Far-left
- Slogan: Peace, Unity and Transformation for Prosperity
- Parliament: 359 / 529 (68%)

Website
- nrm.ug

The National Resistance Movement (NRM; Swahili: Harakati za Upinzani za Kitaifa) is a political party led by President Yoweri Museveni. It has been the ruling party in Uganda since 1986. The party has ruled Uganda as an authoritarian regime under Museveni.

== History ==
The National Resistance Movement (NRM) was founded as a liberation movement that waged a guerrilla war through its rebel wing National Resistance Army (NRA) that toppled the government in 1986.

== Leadership ==
The party's leader, Yoweri Museveni, was involved in the war that deposed Idi Amin, ending his rule in 1979, and in the rebellion that subsequently led to the demise of the Milton Obote regime in 1985; however, parallels have been drawn between the NRM and its predecessors in terms of suppressing fundamental freedoms. For instance, the NRM-sponsored Public Order Management Bill is strikingly similar to the 1967 Public Order and Security Act, codified by the Obote regime, in that both bills "seek to gag dissenting views." Museveni's statements are also reminiscent of Uganda's dictatorial past: "Whoever tries to cause problems, we finish them. Besigye [an opposition leader] tried to disorganize Kampala and we gave him a little tear gas and he calmed down. He didn't need a bullet, just a little gas." Further, as he once stated that "the problem of Africa in general and Uganda in particular is not the people but leaders who want to overstay in power," some have viewed his move to abolish presidential term limits as hypocritical. In the past, the NRM has been praised for bringing relative stability and economic growth to a country that has endured decades of government mismanagement, rebel activity and civil war. However, with an unemployment rate of 62% among the youth, Museveni's economic effectiveness has seriously come into question. His tenure has witnessed one of the most effective national responses to HIV/AIDS in Africa.

In the mid-to-late 1990s, Museveni was lauded by the West as part of a new generation of African leaders. His presidency has been marred, however, by invading and occupying Congo during the Second Congo War (the war in the Democratic Republic of the Congo which has resulted in an estimated 5.4 million deaths since 1998) and other conflicts in the Great Lakes region. Recent developments, including the abolition of presidential term limits before the 2006 elections, Museveni's confirmation of the NRM-sponsored Public Order Management Bill — a bill which severely limits freedom of assembly — NRM media censorship and the persecution of democratic opposition (i.e. general intimidation of voters by security forces; arresting opposition candidates; extrajudicial killings) have attracted concern from domestic and foreign commentators. Most recently, indicators of an alleged succession to the President's son, Muhoozi Kainerugaba, have increased tensions.

Allegations regarding significant corruption have also shaped criticism of the NRM government. According to the U.S. State Department's 2012 Human Rights Report on Uganda, "The World Bank's most recent Worldwide Governance Indicators reflected corruption was a severe problem" and that "the country annually loses 768.9 billion shillings ($286 million) to corruption." Understandably, Uganda was ranked 140th out of 176 nations on the Corruption Perceptions Index. A specific scandal, which had significant international consequences and highlighted the presence of corruption in high-level government offices, was the embezzlement of $12.6 mil in donor funds from the Office of the Prime Minister in 2012. These funds were "earmarked as crucial support for rebuilding northern Uganda, ravaged by a 20-year war, and Karamoja, Uganda's poorest region." This scandal prompted the E.U., the U.K., Germany, Denmark, Ireland and Norway to suspend aid. What may compound this problem — as it does in many developing nations (as per the resource curse) — is an abundance of oil.

The Petroleum Bill — passed by the Ugandan Parliament in 2012 — which was touted by the NRM as bringing transparency to the oil sector has, failed to please domestic and international political commentators and economists. For instance, Angelo Izama, a Ugandan energy analyst at the U.S.-based Open Society Foundation said the new law was tantamount to "handing over an ATM (cash) machine" to Museveni and his regime. According to Global Witness, an international law NGO, Uganda now has "oil reserves that have the potential to double the government's revenue within six to ten years, worth an estimated US$2.4bn per year."

Other contentious bills have been sponsored, passed and confirmed by the NRM government during his tenure. For example, The Non Governmental Organizations (Amendment) Act, passed in 2006, has stifled the productivity of NGOs through erecting barriers to entry, activity, funding and assembly within the sector. Burdensome and corrupt registration procedures (i.e. requiring recommendations from government officials; annual re-registration), unreasonable regulation of operations (i.e. requiring government notification prior to making contact with individuals in NGO's area of interest), and the precondition that all foreign funds be passed through the Bank of Uganda, among other things, are severely limiting the output of the NGO sector. Furthermore, the sector's freedom of speech has been continually infringed upon through the use of intimidation, and the recent Public Order Management Bill (severely limiting freedom of assembly) will only add to the government's stockpile of ammunition.

== Electoral performance ==
The party began as the political body associated with the rebel National Resistance Army before Museveni came to power in 1986. Until a referendum in 2005, Uganda held elections on a non-party basis. The NRM currently has a majority in the Ugandan parliament, a position it has maintained since 1996. The presidential elections of 12 March 2001 were won by Yoweri Museveni of the NRM with 69.3% of the popular vote.

On 17 November 2005, Museveni was elected unopposed as NRM's presidential candidate for the 2006 elections.

In the general election of 23 February 2006, the party won 205 out of 289 elected seats. In the presidential election of the same date, Museveni won 59.3% of the vote.

In the 2016 general election, the party won 293 out of 426 seats. Further, Museveni was reelected president with 56.62% of the vote.

== Mbabazi split ==
National Resistance Movement secretary general Amama Mbabazi fell out with party chairman Yoweri Museveni just before the 2016 general elections. Museveni sacked Mbabazi for having declared interest in running against him to the party chairmanship. Mbabazi left and formed his political movement the GO FORWARD group.

== Ideological shift ==
The predecessor party Uganda Patriotic Movement, embraced socialism. In 1986, NRM embraced both Marxism and Maoism. Soon after, the party separated these ideologies from the party's main principles and ideologies. Currently, the party supports nationalism, social conservatism, right-wing populism, and economic liberalism.

== Election results ==
=== Presidential elections ===
| Election | Candidate | Votes | % | Result |
|---|---|---|---|---|
| 1996 | Yoweri Museveni | 4,428,119 | 74.33% | Elected ✓ |
| 2001 | Yoweri Museveni | 5,123,360 | 69.33% | Elected ✓ |
| 2006 | Yoweri Museveni | 4,109,449 | 59.26% | Elected ✓ |
| 2011 | Yoweri Museveni | 5,428,369 | 68.38% | Elected ✓ |
| 2016 | Yoweri Museveni | 5,971,872 | 60.62% | Elected ✓ |
| 2021 | Yoweri Museveni | 6,042,898 | 58.38% | Elected ✓ |
| 2026 | Yoweri Museveni | 7,946,772 | 71.61% | Elected ✓ |

=== Parliament elections ===
| Election | Leader | Votes | % | Votes | % | Seats | +/– | Position | Result |
| Election | Leader | Constituency | | Women | | Seats | +/– | Position | Result |
|---|---|---|---|---|---|---|---|---|---|
| 1996 | Yoweri Museveni | | | | | 156 / 276 | New | 1st | Majority government |
| 2001 | Yoweri Museveni | | | | | 214 / 295 | ▲58 | 1st | Supermajority government |
| 2006 | Yoweri Museveni | | | | | 213 / 319 | ▼1 | 1st | Supermajority government |
| 2011 | Yoweri Museveni | 3,883,209 | 49.22% | 3,803,608 | 51.56% | 263 / 375 | ▲50 | 1st | Supermajority government |
| 2016 | Yoweri Museveni | 3,945,000 | 48.88% | 3,566,617 | 48.95% | 293 / 426 | ▲30 | 1st | Supermajority government |
| 2021 | Yoweri Museveni | 4,158,934 | 41.60% | 4,532,117 | 44.62% | 336 / 529 | ▲43 | 1st | Majority government |
| 2026 | Yoweri Museveni | 5,000,564 | 47.98% | 5,015,892 | 49.84% | 359 / 529 | ▲23 | 1st | Supermajority government |

== See also ==
- Apollo Ofwono
- Grace Hailat Kaudha Magumba
- LGBT rights in Uganda
