= Politics of Uganda =

Besigye on Democracy in Uganda - Straight Talk Africa.

The politics of Uganda occurs in an authoritarian context. Since its independence, Uganda has not experienced a peaceful democratic transfer of power, with 3 dictators Milton Obote, Idi Amin and Yoweri Museveni dominating its politics. Since assuming office in 1986 at the end of the Ugandan civil war, Yoweri Museveni has ruled Uganda as a dictator. Political parties were banned from 1986 to 2006 in the wake of the 2005 Ugandan multi-party referendum which was won by pro-democracy forces. Since 2006, Museveni has used legal means, patronage, and violence to maintain power.

Under the Ugandan constitution, Uganda is a presidential republic in which the President is the head of state and the prime minister is the head of government business. There is a multi-party system. Executive power is exercised by the government. Legislative power is given to both the government and the National Assembly. The system is based on a democratic parliamentary system with equal rights for all citizens over 18 years of age. The Economist Intelligence Unit rated Uganda a "hybrid regime" in 2022.

== Political culture ==
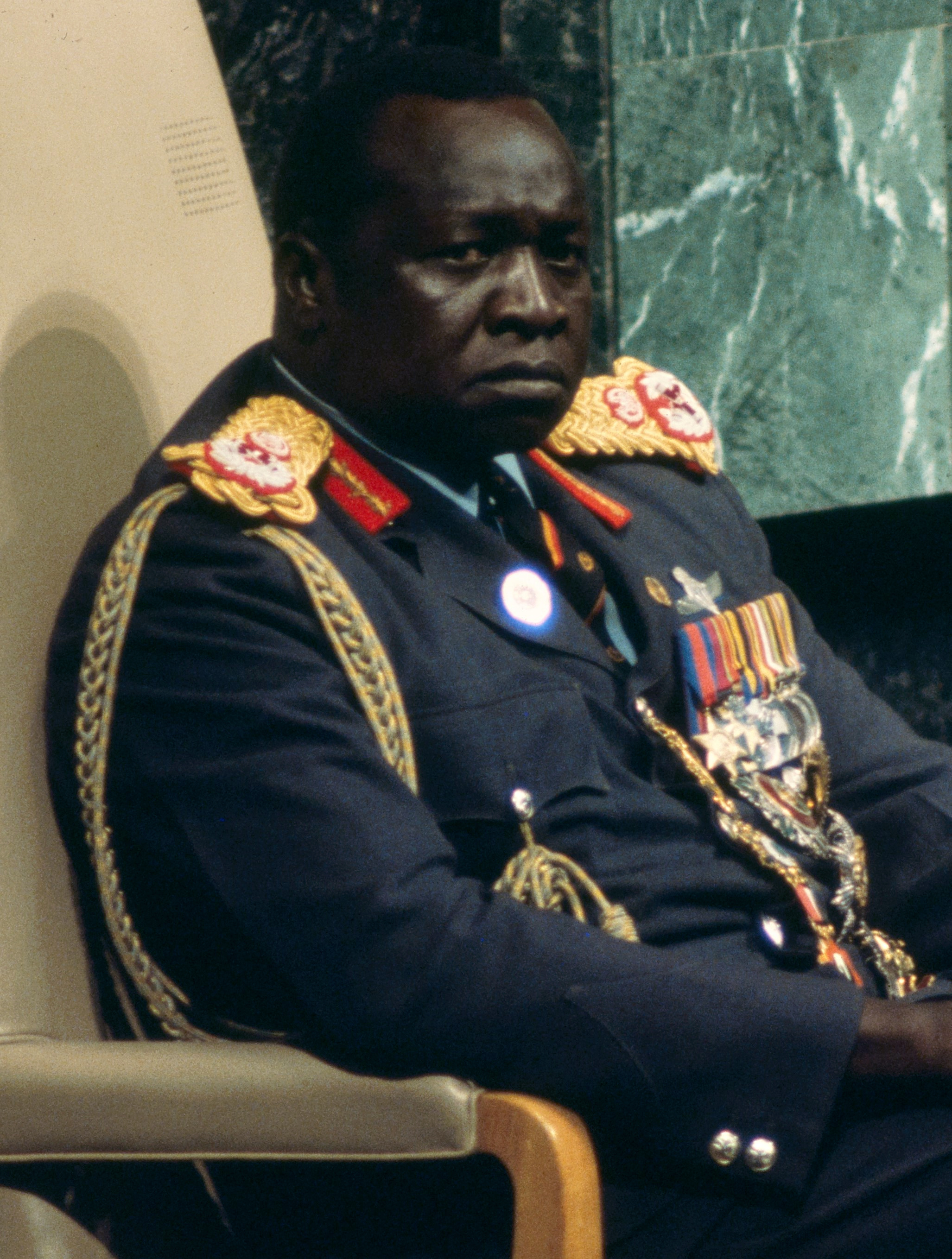
Idi Amin, one of the most notable Ugandan presidents.

After taking power after a five-year civil war in 1986, the authoritarian Yoweri Museveni regime banned political parties from campaigning in elections or field candidates directly (although electoral candidates could belong to political parties). A constitutional referendum canceled this 19-year ban on multi-party politics in July 2005.

Presidential elections were held in February 2006. Museveni ran against several candidates, of whom the most prominent was the exiled Dr. Kizza Besigye. Museveni was declared the winner. Besigye alleged fraud, and rejected the result. The Supreme Court of Uganda ruled that the election was marred by intimidation, violence, voter disenfranchisement, and other irregularities. However, the Court voted 4-3 to uphold the results of the election.

== Executive ==
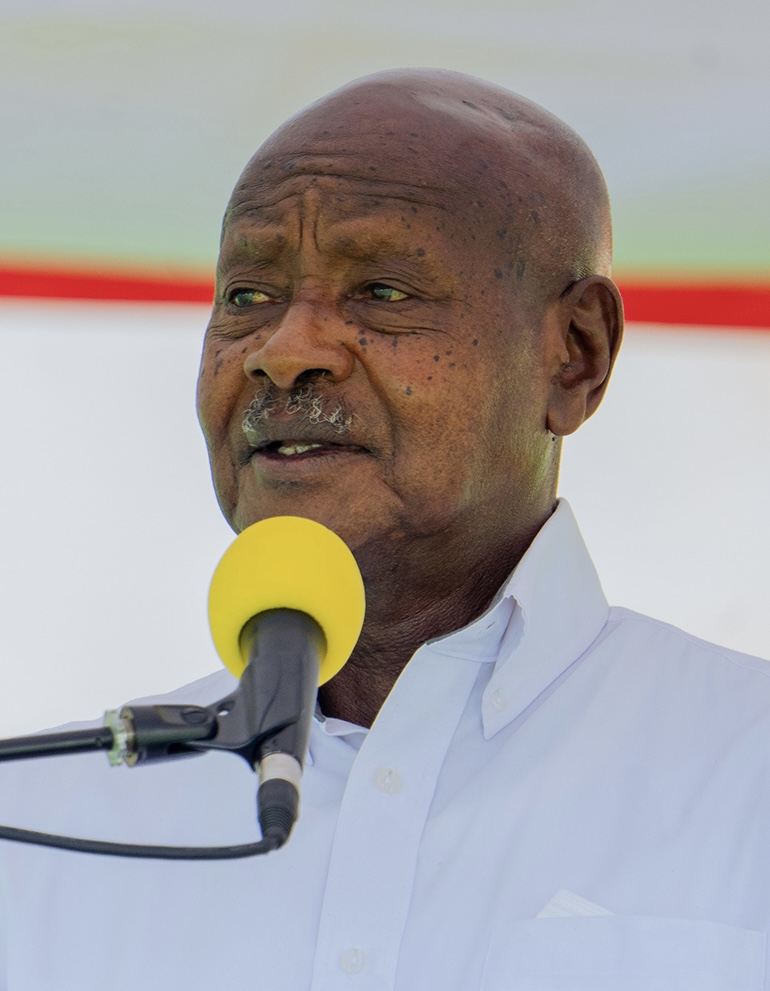
Yoweri Museveni, current President of Uganda.

Main office-holders
Office	Name	Party	Since
President	Yoweri Museveni	National Resistance Movement	26 January 1986
Prime Minister	Robinah Nabbanja	National Resistance Movement	21 June 2021

The head of state in Uganda is the President, who is elected by a popular vote to a five-year term. This is currently Yoweri Museveni, who is also the head of the armed forces. The previous presidential elections were in February 2011, and in the election of February 2016, Museveni was elected with 68 percent of the vote. The cabinet is appointed by the president from among the elected legislators. The prime minister of Uganda, Robina Nabbanja, assists the president in the supervision of the cabinet.

The Cabinet of Uganda, according to the Constitution of Uganda, "shall consist of the President, the Vice President and such number of Ministers as may appear to the President to be reasonably necessary for the efficient running of the State."

=== Ministries of Uganda ===
The below are the ministries in Uganda:

- Ministry of Foreign Affairs
- Ministry of Justice & Constitutional Affairs
- Ministry of Public Service
- Ministry of Finance, Planning, and Economic Development
- Ministry of Education and Sports
- Ministry for Karamoja Affairs
- Ministry of Local Government
- Ministry of Science, Technology and Innovation
- Ministry of Health
- Ministry of Works and Transport
- Ministry of Lands, Housing & Urban Development
- Ministry of Internal Affairs
- Ministry of Tourism, Wildlife and Antiquities
- Ministry of Water and Environment
- Ministry of Gender, Labour & Social Development
- Ministry of Energy and Mineral Development
- Ministry of Security
- Ministry of Defence and Veterans Affairs
- Ministry of Agriculture, Animal Industry and Fisheries
- Ministry of Information and Communications Technology
- Ministry of Disaster Preparedness and Refugees
- Ministry of Trade, Industry and Cooperatives

== Political parties and elections ==
=== Presidential elections ===
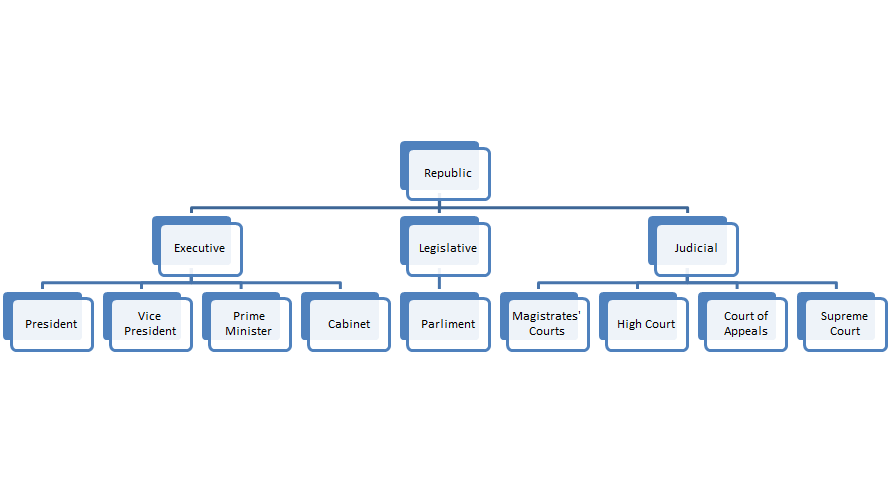
The structure of Uganda's government.

The most recent presidential elections in Uganda were held on 14 January 2021 featuring 11 aspirants comprising 10 men and 1 woman.

The announced but contested results are as follows;

Candidates' Names	Votes	Percentage
Amuriat Oboi Patrick	337,589	3.26%
Kabuleta Kiiza Joseph	45,424	0.44%
Kalembe Nancy Linda	38,772	0.37%
Katumba John	37,554	0.36%
Robert Kyagulanyi Ssentamu	3,631,437	35.08%
Mao Norbert	57,682	0.56%
Mayambala Willy	15,014	0.15%
Mugisha Muntu Gregg	67,574	0.65%
Mwesigye Fred	25,483	0.25%
Tumukunde Henry Kakurugu	51,392	0.50%
Yoweri Museveni	6,042,898	58.38%
Invalid Votes	393,500	3.66%
Valid Votes	10,350,819	

Source: Uganda Electoral Commission

In this 2021 election, the pop star-turned-politician Bobi Wine (also known as Robert Kyagulanyi Sentamu) was runner-up and challenged the election results in the country's highest court (Supreme Court), seeking to overturn Museveni's victory. The highly contested election was marred with violence; the European Parliament voiced outrage and condemnation, calling for sanctions against individuals and organizations responsible for human rights violations in Uganda.

The results of the most recent presidential election from 2021 are as below:

Candidate	Party	Votes	%
Yoweri Museveni	National Resistance Movement	6,042,898	58.38
Bobi Wine	National Unity Platform	3,631,437	35.08
Patrick Amuriat	Forum for Democratic Change	337,589	3.26
Mugisha Muntu	Alliance for National Transformation	67,574	0.65
Norbert Mao	Democratic Party	57,682	0.56
Henry Tumukunde	Independent	51,392	0.50
Joseph Kabuleta	Independent	45,424	0.44
Nancy Kalembe	Independent	38,772	0.37
John Katumba	Independent	37,554	0.36
Fred Mwesigye	Independent	25,483	0.25
Willy Mayambala	Independent	15,014	0.15
Total		10,350,819	100.00
Valid votes		10,350,819	96.34
Invalid/blank votes		393,500	3.66
Total votes		10,744,319	100.00
Registered voters/turnout		18,103,603	59.35
Source: ECU

=== Parliamentary elections ===
The results of the most recent parliamentary election from 2021 are as below:

Party	Constituency			Second round			Seats		
Party	Votes	%	Seats	Votes	%	Seats	Appointed	Total	+/–
National Resistance Movement	4,158,934	41.60	218	4,532,814	44.81	101	17	336	+42
National Unity Platform	1,347,929	13.48	43	1,607,425	15.89	14	0	57	New
Forum for Democratic Change	729,247	7.29	24	674,154	6.66	8	0	32	–4
Democratic Party	245,248	2.45	8	181,364	1.79	1	0	9	–6
Uganda People's Congress	180,313	1.80	7	229,884	2.27	2	0	9	+3
Alliance for National Transformation	72,018	0.72	0	82,318	0.81	0	0	0	New
Justice Forum	24,843	0.25	1	22,625	0.22	0	0	1	+1
People's Progressive Party	10,076	0.10	1				0	1	+1
Uganda Economic Party	6,199	0.06	0				0	0	New
Ecological Party of Uganda	4,287	0.04	0				0	0	New
Conservative Party	1,071	0.01	0				0	0	0
Social Democratic Party	719	0.01	0				0	0	0
Forum for Integrity in Leadership	122	0.00	0				0	0	New
Congress Service Volunteers Organisation	68	0.00	0				0	0	New
Independents	3,217,480	32.18	51	2,785,676	27.54	20	3	74	+8
Uganda People's Defense Force							10	10	0
Total	9,998,554	100.00	353	10,116,260	100.00	146	30	529	+103
Source: Electoral Commission

== Judiciary ==
The Ugandan judiciary operates as an independent branch of government and consists of magistrate's courts, high courts, courts of appeal (which organizes itself as the Constitutional Court of Uganda when hearing constitutional issues), and the Supreme Court. Judges for the High Court are appointed by the president; Judges for the Court of Appeal are appointed by the president and approved by the legislature.

Pius Bigirimana is the permanent secretary since 2019

== Foreign relations ==
A fight between the Ugandan and Libyan presidential guards sparked chaos during a ceremony attended by the heads of state from 11 African nations on March 19, 2008.

== International organization participation ==
- ACP (Lomé Convention)
- African Development Bank
- Commonwealth of Nations
- East African Development Bank
- Food and Agriculture Organization
- Group of 77
- Intelsat
- Intergovernmental Authority on Development
- International Atomic Energy Agency
- International Bank for Reconstruction and Development
- International Civil Aviation Organization
- International Confederation of Free Trade Unions
- International Criminal Court
- International Development Association
- International Finance Corporation
- International Fund for Agricultural Development
- International Labour Organization
- International Monetary Fund
- International Red Cross and Red Crescent Movement
- International Olympic Committee
- International Organization for Migration
- International Organization for Standardization (correspondent)
- International Telecommunication Union
- Interpol
- Islamic Development Bank
- Non-Aligned Movement
- Organisation for the Prohibition of Chemical Weapons
- Organization of African Unity
- Organization of Islamic Cooperation
- Permanent Court of Arbitration
- United Nations
- United Nations Conference on Trade and Development
- United Nations Economic Commission for Africa
- United Nations Educational, Scientific and Cultural Organization
- United Nations High Commissioner for Refugees
- United Nations Industrial Development Organization
- Universal Postal Union
- World Customs Organization
- World Federation of Trade Unions
- World Health Organization
- World Intellectual Property Organization
- World Meteorological Organization
- World Tourism Organization
- World Trade Organization

== See also ==
- List of government ministries of Uganda
- Cabinet of Uganda
- Freedom of the press in Uganda
- Internet censorship and surveillance in Uganda
- Parliament of Uganda
- Supreme Court of Uganda
- 2006 Ugandan general election
- List of political parties in Uganda

== Sources ==
- Uganda's opposition join forces (BBC News, 16 February 2004)
- "Uganda 'night commuters' flee rebel brutality" (Yahoo News, October 17, 2005)
- Tripp, Aili Mari, Museveni’s Uganda: Paradoxes of Power in a Hybrid Regime, Lynne Rienner Publishers, 2010.
