= Christine Nakimwero Kaaya =

Ugandan politician (born 1979)

Hon Christine Nakimwero Kaaya
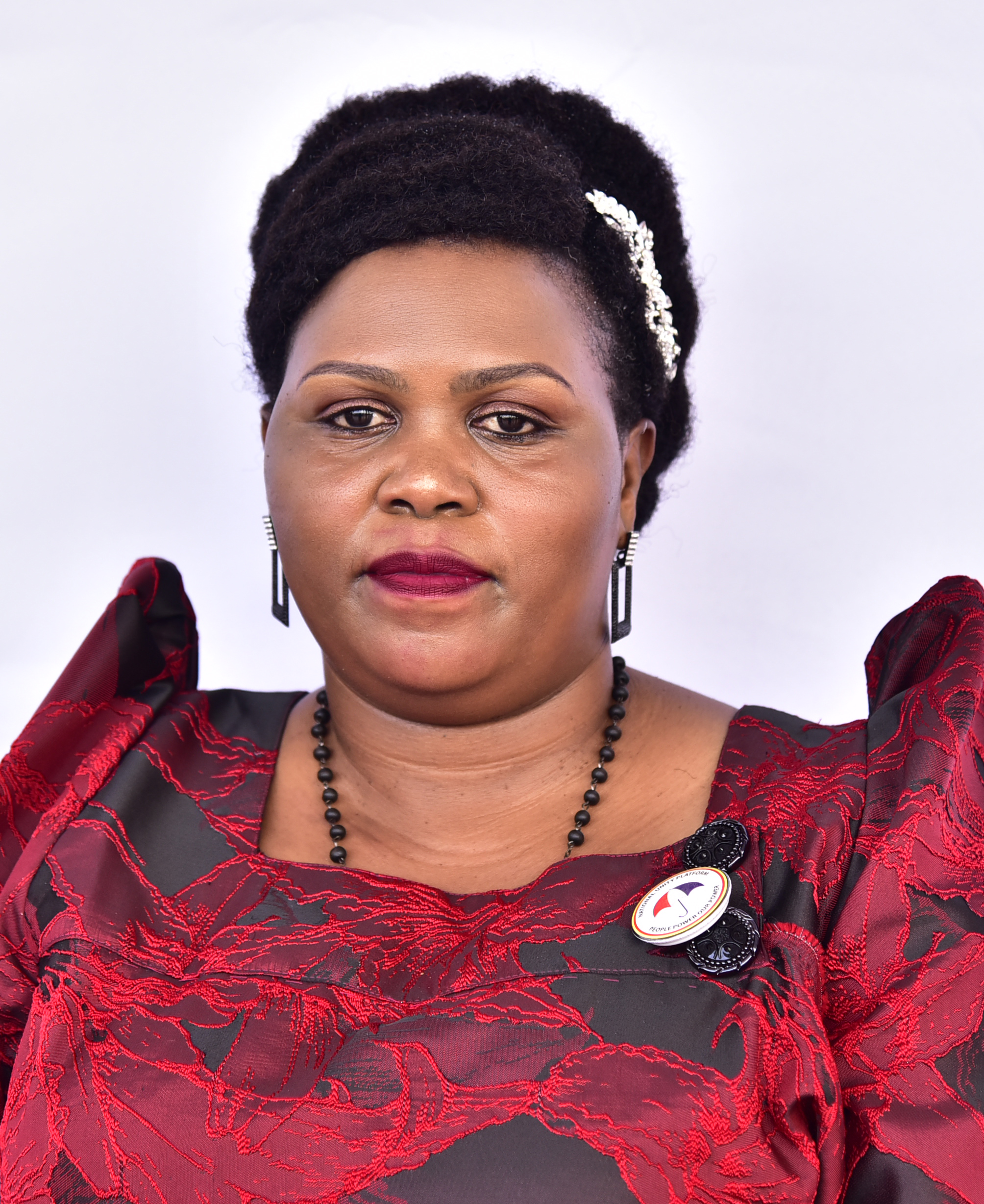
- Minister: Shadow Minister for Water and Environment

Personal details
- Born: Kiboga District
- Citizenship: Uganda
- Party: National Unity Platform
- Education: 1. St Joseph’s Primary School in Mubende; 2. Caltec Academy Makerere in Kampala; 3. St. Kizito High school Bethany in Mityana District
- Alma mater: Makerere University (Degree in Environmental Management)

Christine Nakimwero Kaaya also written as Christine Kaaya Nakimwero (born 1979) is a Ugandan politician, legislator, and woman representative for Kiboga District in the eleventh parliament of Uganda. She is a member of the National Unity Platform (NUP). She is an activist for gender, health, population, and environment

Nakimwero is the Shadow Minister for Water and Environment and serves on the Parliamentary Climate Change Committee and Natural Resources Committee in the eleventh parliament of Uganda

== Early life and education ==
Nakimwero was born in Bukomero town council in Kiboga District. She studied at St Joseph's Primary School in Mubende, Caltec Academy Makerere in Kampala, and St. Kizito High School Bethany in Mityana District. She later went to Makerere University where she graduated with a degree in Environmental Management. She holds a Masters in land use and regional development.

== Career ==
Nakimwero is a former forestry officer in the Kiboga District. Nakimwero was a coordinator for the Parliamentary Forum on Climate Change -Uganda (PFCC-U). She was the chairperson for the 20 Ugandan parliamentary Fora. Nakimwero is a member of the Green Climate Fund Designated Authority Committee. She is the director of the African Coalition on Green Growth. Nakimwero is a member of the Uganda Climate Change Thematic negotiation group under the United Nations Framework Convention on Climate Change arrangement. Nakimwero is a member of the National Association of Professional Environmentalists. She also sits on the Parliamentary Committee on Environment and Natural Resources

Nakimwero was dissatisfied with the government's proposal to introduce competitive bidding on a ‘first come, first served’ basis while applying for an exploration license on grounds that it was gender insensitive and might disadvantage other vulnerable categories of people who are not privy to such vital information. This was when the Minister of State for Minerals, Peter Lokeris, on 7 December 2021 presented the long-awaited Bill the Mining and Minerals Bill, 2021 to the committee for scrutiny. This bill was meant to repeal the Mining Act, of 2003 which had become ‘inadequate’ and ‘obsolete’ in protecting and streamlining the mining sector in Uganda.

Nakimwero was among the members of the Parliament of Uganda who rejected the East African Crude Oil Pipeline Project (EACOP) (Special Provisions) Bill 2021. She presented the minority report parliament on behalf of Asinansi Nyakato (FDC), where the opposition members of the Parliament of Uganda argued the Bill was not properly scrutinized.

== Other works ==
Nakimwero bought a brand new taxi van for private school teachers in Kiboga District to act as their income source for having been jobless for over two years due to the closure of schools in the COVID-19 pandemic lockdown.

Nakimwero handed over two hundred tree seedlings to Green Radio Community during the World Environment Day 2021 commemorations which took place at the Gre Radio offices in Kiboga District and were received by Julius Kyamanywa, the Station Manager.

Nakimwero represented the Uganda on the COP26 Talks which took place in Glasgow.

She encouraged the people of Bukomero Town Council in Kiboga District to plant food that is rich in nutrients, this was during a training to teach people to grow sweet potatoes. She told the people of Kiboga that the sweet potato vines were going to be distributed for free from different parts of Kiboga including Lwamata Town Council.

== Personal life ==
Nakimwero is married and has children

== See also ==
- List of members of the eleventh Parliament of Uganda
- Sauda Kauma
- Helen Nakimuli
- Parliament of Uganda
- National Unity Platform
