= Manjeri Kyebakutika =

Ugandan politician

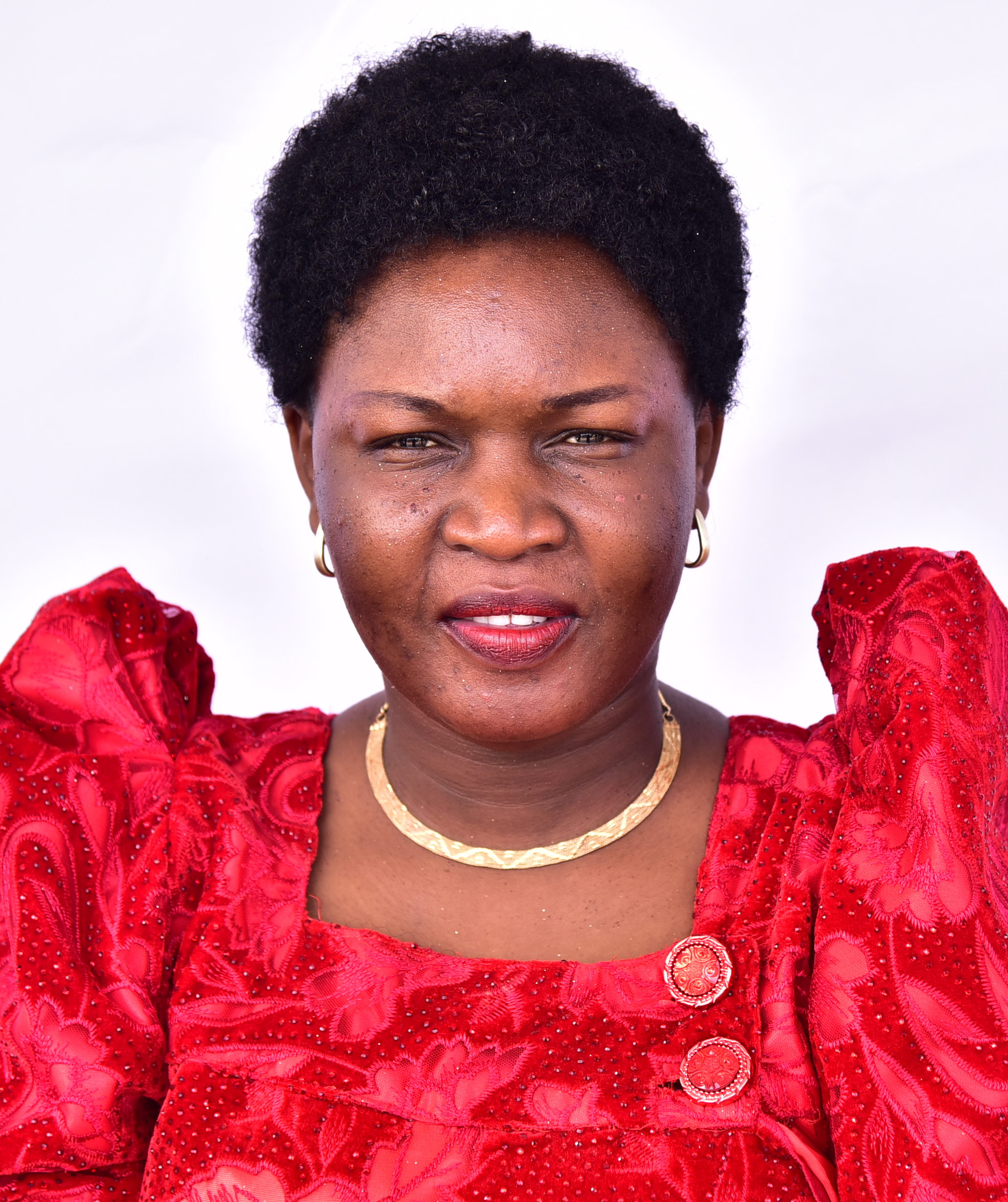
- Occupations: Legislator and Politician
- Employer: Parliament of Uganda
- Known for: Politics
- Title: Woman Member of Parliament; Jinja City
- Term: 24 May 2021
- Political party: National Unity Platform

Manjeri Kyebakutika is a Ugandan legislator and politician for Jinja City in the Busoga Sub-region in the eleventh Parliament of Uganda. She is affiliated to the National Unity Platform (NUP).

== Political career ==
Manjeri was elected into the eleventh parliament as the first member of parliament for Jinja city. Manjeri was appointed as the deputy chief chip of the eleventh parliament of Uganda. She was arrested for putting on a red barret for NUP while addressing the press after attending the Kyabazinga's coronation anniversary at Iganga palace in Jinja and after arrest, Manjeri accused the Uganda Police for torturing her leaving her with chest and back injuries.

In the recently concluded elections, she was overpowered by his rival from NUP Sarah Lwansasula.

== Other works ==
Manjeri informed the Ugandan parliament about the insecurity in Jinja City due to the panic caused by panga welding criminals who threatened to kill people and that police was not deployed to avert the attacks. She asked the government to return what belongs to Busoga Sub-region and obwa'kyabazinga of Busoga as in land, forests, district headquarters and properties currently occupied by government agencies among others. She complained to the government about not turning Busoga university into a public university. Manjeri donated food and hand washing dispensers to the people she represents in the parliament of Uganda. She raised a concern in the Ugandan parliament about the brutality used by Umeme staff in Jinja which included beating, using tear gas to disperse crowds during their operations on illegal electricity connections in Jinja City.

== See also ==
1. List of members of the eleventh Parliament of Uganda
2. Sauda Kauma
3. Parliament of Uganda
4. Jinja
5. National Unity Platform (NUP)
