= Adjumani East =

Parliamentary constituency in Uganda

- Single-member constituency for the Parliament of Uganda
- District: Adjumani
- Population: 439,400
- Area: 3128 sq km

Current constituency

Adjumani East is a constituency in Adjumani District that elects one member to the Parliament of Uganda. It is currently represented by Mamawi James (NRM). It is in the North, and borders South Sudan to its Northeast.

== Election results ==
=== 2021 ===
2021 Ugandan general election, Adjumani East county
Party	Candidate	Votes	%
NRM	James Mamawi	12,014	46.59%
Independent	Angel Mark Dulu (I)	10,728	41.60%
Independent	Peter Langi	1,722	6.67%
Independent	Daniel Anyama	933	3.61%
FDC	Lawrence Dulu Adrawa	390	1.51%
Total votes		25,787	100%

=== 2016 ===
2016 Ugandan general election, Adjumani East county
Party	Candidate	Votes	%
NRM	Angel Mark Dulu	14,043	65.98%
Independent	Piro Santos Eruaga	5,741	26.97%
Independent	Mindra Celestino Darasson	991	4.66%
Independent	F. D. Beaker Anyama	505	2.37%
Independent	Peter Langi	5	0.02%
Total votes		21,285	100.0
