= Shamim Malende =

Ugandan lawyer and politician

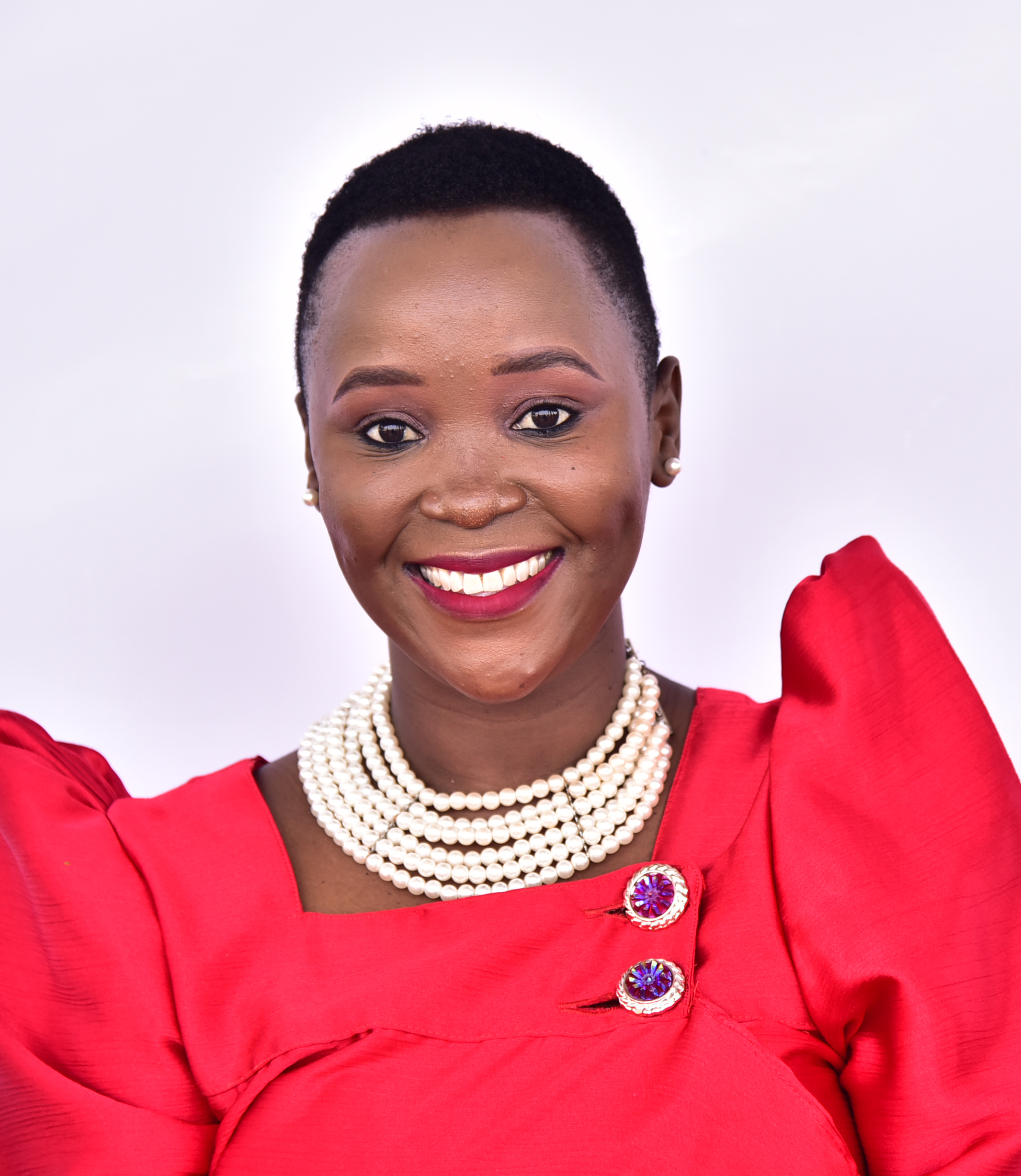
- Born: 1986 (age 39–40); Uganda
- Education: Makerere University (Bachelor of Laws); Law Development Centre (Diploma in Legal Practice)
- Title: Hon. MP for Kampala District Women Constituency in the 11th Parliament (2021–2026); Hon Minister of Justice in alternative government; Advocate; Commissioner for oaths; Notary Public

Shamim Malende born in 1986, is a Ugandan lawyer, commissioner for oaths, notary public, politician, and community activist. She is a member of the National Unity Platform (NUP) political party and the only woman on the legal team of Robert Kyagulanyi Ssentamu.

In the 2021 general election, she was elected to Parliament as the Women's Representative for Kampala District for the 2021-2026 term. She was re-elected as a women's representative for Kampala District in the 12th Parliament for the term year 2026–2031.

== Early life and education ==
Malende was born in Kawempe, Kampala, Uganda's capital city, in December 1986, to Alhajj Jamal Ahmed Sebuta Malende, an attorney, and Jane Francis Nasunna, a school teacher.

She attended Busaale Church of Uganda Primary School in Kayunga District. She completed her O-Level studies at Buziga Islamic Theological Institute in Bbunga, a neighborhood in Makindye Division, Kampala. She then transferred to Aisha Girls High School in the city of Mbarara, in the Western Region of Uganda. She graduated as the best student in the Western Region and among the top ten in the country after scoring AAAA in her A-Level examinations in 2000.

She was admitted to Makerere University, Uganda's oldest and largest public university, on government sponsorship. She graduated with a Bachelor of Laws degree in 2005. She then went on to obtain a postgraduate Diploma in Legal Practice, from the Law Development Centre in Kampala. She was admitted to the Uganda Bar in 2008.

== Career ==
After graduation from university, she worked in her father’s chambers before opening her own legal practice, Malende & Company Advocates.

In the 2018-2020 time frame, she has handled nearly 200 pro-bono cases of Ugandan citizens imprisoned for various political offenses. The majority of her clients are urban, young, poor, and subscribe to the People Power, Our Power Movement, and to the National Unity Platform political party. She was invited to join the People Power Legal Team, which is led by Asuman Basalirwa and Benjamin katana.

== Political ambition ==
Having grown up from a deeply legal and political family, she had over seven years of experience in this field. Malende is a member of the Power pressure group of the National Unity Platform(NUP). She is known as an Iron lady and also a lawyer of the People Power team and she was the only female on Robert Kyagulanyi Sentamu's legal team. She has been representing NUP supporters that were jailed during and after the 2021 general election . In 2020, she declared her intention to contest aa woman Representative for Kampala City in the 2021 Uganda general Parliamentary election s. This pitted her against Stella Nyanzi, who was also running for the same position, on the Forum for Democratic Change political party ticket. She won the seat. Shamim contested again for the Kampala woman representative Parliamentary seat in the 2026 Uganda general elections and won again.

== See also ==
- Ligomarc Advocates
- Bobi Wine
