= Willy Mayambala =

Ugandan politician

Willy Mayambala is an Ugandan engineer and politician. He ran for the office of the president of Uganda in the 2021 president poll as an independent candidate. He was one of the four less visible presidential candidates and blamed his poor performance at the poll on the ten-man security guard who he claimed prevented him from going out to canvass for votes.

== Presidential campaign ==
Mayambala was one of the ten candidates who challenged long serving president Yoweri Musaveni in the January 14, 2021 presidential polls. Mayambala was less vibrant in the presidential campaigns and came last with only 0.15 per cent or 15,657 votes he received. He blamed his paltry vote on the low turnout of voters (57.22%), and the Electoral Commission for not sensitising the electorates to vote during the election.

On February 25, he personally wrote the Supreme Court requesting to take over a petition filed by a presidential candidate Robert Kyagulanyi Ssentamu of the National Unity Platform challenging the election of Musaveni as information emerged that Robert Kyagulanyi Ssentamu had abandoned the case in court. The court replied Mayambala with an advice to hire a lawyer first before applying for a takeover of the case.

When he appeared before a parliamentary committee investigating cases of violence during the election, Mayambala complained that he was harassed by his own official ten-man security details throughout the campaign period. He told the committee that his security guards blocked him from going to campaign venues because he did not have a personal vehicle and had to scale perimeter fences to evade his security details who would chase him upon discovery that he had escaped leading to chaos in the streets. During an on air program, the Morning Breeze show, Mayambala was asked about his financial status after his presidential campaign he responded that the election left him poorer, jobless and down to earth.
