= Muwada Nkunyingi =

Internet personality (born 1982)

Member of Parliament (Uganda)
- Incumbent
- Assumed office 12 July 2021
- Preceded by: Robert Kyagulanyi Ssentamu
- Constituency: Kyadondo County East

Personal details
- Born: Haroon Muwada Nkunyingi; 27 July 1982 (age 43) Kabubu Manyangwa, Uganda
- Party: NUP
- Children: 4
- Education: Kisaasi Primary School; Makerere University; Gombe Secondary School
- Website: x.com/nkunyingimuwad1

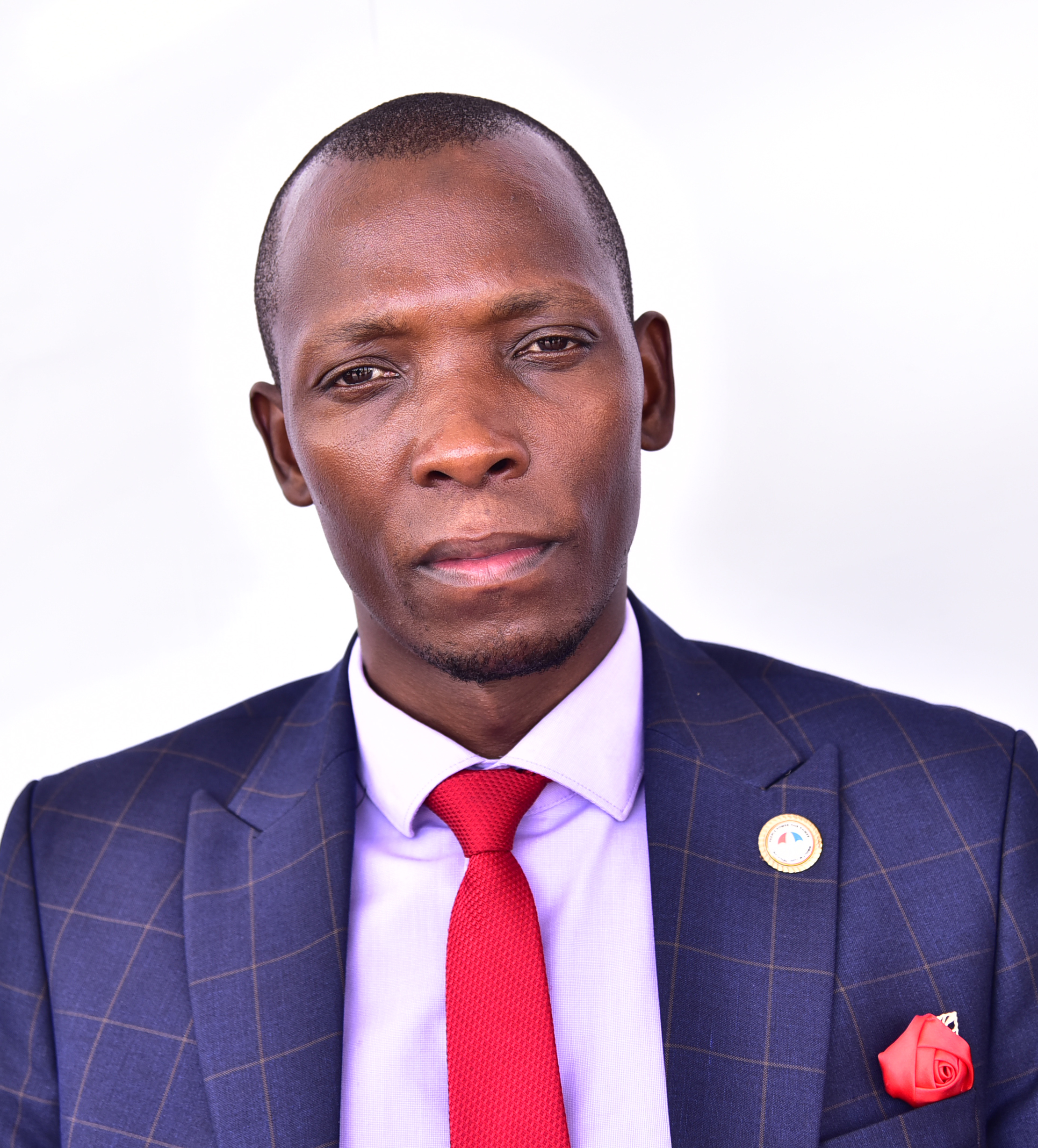
Nkunyingi Muwada: Kyadondo County East Wakiso (NUP)

Haroon Muwada Nkunyingi (born 27 July 1982) also known as Muwada Nkunyingi, is a Ugandan politician and lawyer, he is the Member of Parliament for Kyadondo County East constituency in Wakiso District in Uganda's Central Region.

== Early life and education ==
Muwada was born on 27 July 1982. He began his education at Kisaasi Primary School, and later attended Kololo High School for his O-level studies. For A-level, he continued at Gombe Secondary School. He went on to earn a Bachelor's Degree in Law and subsequently a Master of Laws from Makerere University and a Diploma from the Uganda Law Development Centre in Kampala.

== Legal career and advocacy ==
As an advocate, Nkunyingi petitioned the Electoral Commission to release President Museveni's academic documents submitted in the 2016 elections—citing concerns over vetting and constitutional requirements.

== Political career and affiliations ==
He first contested the Kyadondo East parliamentary seat as an independent in 2016 but lost, garnering around 7,560 votes. He then won in 2021, running under the National Unity Platform (NUP).

== Parliamentary tenure and shadow cabinet role ==
As MP, Muwada has served as the Shadow Minister for Foreign Affairs, where he has raised concerns:

- Criticized Uganda's large UN delegation as wasteful and called for support to stranded nationals.
- Issued warnings regarding deteriorating diplomatic relations, including ambassadors being recalled or declared persona non grata.
