= David Lewis Rubongoya =

Ugandan lawyer and politician

David Rubongoya

Secretary-General of the National Unity Platform
- Incumbent
- Assumed office 14 July, 2020
- Preceded by: Paul Simbwa (as NURP)

Personal details
- Born: David Lewis Rubongoya; 6 January 1988 (age 38) Mbarara, Uganda
- Education: Makerere University (Bachelor of Laws); Law Development Centre (Post Graduate Diploma in Legal Practice); Harvard Law School (Master of Laws); University of Oxford (Masters in International Human Rights Law)
- Occupation: Lawyer
- Known for: Political activist

David Lewis Rubongoya (born January 6,1988) is a Ugandan lawyer, politician and university lecturer who played a key role in the founding of the National Unity Platform (NUP) political party, alongside its president Bobi Wine. He currently serves as the NUP's inaugural Secretary General since 2020. He was also part of the People Power movement as an ally of Bobi Wine.

== Early life and education ==
Rubongoya was born on January 6, 1988, in Mbarara district to Goodman James Rubongoya and Nankunda Medius. He attended Kanyaryeru Primary School and Lake Mburo Secondary School, where he obtained the Uganda Certificate of Education. He later attended Nganwa High School in Bushenyi, where he was Head Prefect and earned the Uganda Advanced Certificate of Education.

Rubongoya went on to pursue a Bachelor's Degree in Law at Makerere University in Kampala before attending the Law Development Centre to become an advocate. In 2014, he was awarded a scholarship to pursue a Master's degree in Law at Harvard University in the United States, with a special focus on constitutional law. After returning to Uganda and working briefly at the Equal Opportunities Commission, he was granted another opportunity to study at the University of Oxford in the United Kingdom, where he obtained a master's degree in International Human Rights Law.

== Political career ==
After returning to Uganda from the US after his studies at Harvard University, Rubongoya took on various jobs, including working as a lecturer at the International University of East Africa in Kampala. It was during his time at the university that he met Bobi Wine, who was one of his students and a popular local musician in Uganda with social and politically inclined lyrics at the time. The two developed a close friendship, and in 2017, when Bobi Wine successfully ran for a parliamentary by-election and became a member of parliament for Kyadondo East constituency, Rubongoya was one of his supporters.

In the same year, a controversial debate arose about granting President Museveni more power to rule after he reached the age of 75, which was the maximum age limit according to the Ugandan constitution. Rubongoya, who was an expert in constitutional law, was concerned about the potential abuse of power and joined the opposition, switching from his previous support for the ruling NRM party.

In 2020, Bobi Wine, Rubongoya, and other key figures launched the National Unity Platform (NUP) political party, which was the political wing of the People Power movement led by Bobi Wine. Rubongoya was appointed as the party's General Secretary, and in 2021, the NUP participated in its first general election. Despite concerns about the election's fairness, Bobi Wine won more than 40% of the vote in his presidential bid, and the NUP secured 62 seats in the Ugandan parliament, a milestone for a new political party in Uganda.

Rubongoya and his colleagues in the NUP have since become the leading opposition political party in Uganda, despite the challenges they have faced in their efforts to promote democracy and human rights in the country.

== Personal life ==
Rubongoya is currently unmarried and has four daughters.
