= Barbie Kyagulanyi =

Ugandan author and activist (born 1984)

- Born: Barbara Itungo; 7 September 1984 (age 42); Ntungamo, Uganda
- Education: Makerere University , University of London
- Occupation: Author
- Spouse: Bobi Wine (m. 2011)
- Writing career
- Years active: c. 2012–present

Barbara Kyagulanyi (born 7 September 1984) is a Ugandan philanthropist and author. She is the author of "Golden Memories of a Village Belle" published in 2012. She is married to singer and politician Robert Kyagulanyi Ssentamu, alias Bobi Wine, with whom she has four children.

== Early life and education ==
Barbie was born on 7 September 1984 in Ntungamo District, South Western Uganda. Her parents are Doctors Gershom Kagaju and Joy Kagaju. She attended St. Hellen's Primary School, Nyamitanga in Mbarara, Bweranyangi Girls' school in Bushenyi for her O and A levels for six years. She then joined Makerere University where she studied Social work and Social Administration. She also completed a master's degree in Human Rights at the University of London.

== Career ==
In 2013, Barbie founded Caring Hearts Uganda, an NGO which focuses on adolescent girls, HIV/AIDS education and menstrual hygiene. The NGO has donated infrastructure and resources to schools for marginalized and internally displaced children.

In 2017, Barbie campaigned for her husband Bobi Wine to become a member of parliament and later for presidency in 2020 with her manifesto about women's rights. She fought for the release of Bobi Wine when he was jailed at the Nalufenya detention facility during his presidential campaign in 2020. Both were put under house arrest without a trial by Ugandan security forces in 2021 due to fears Bobi's public presence could incite riots. Eleven days later the house arrest was ruled illegal.

Their campaign for presidency was depicted in the documentary Bobi Wine: The People's President which was nominated for the Academy Award for Best Documentary Feature in 2024.

In January 2026, following the 2026 general elections, Bobi Wine reported that she was assaulted by soldiers in a raid on their residence, requiring hospitalization.

== Personal life ==
Barbie met Bobi Wine when she was in high school while Bobi was a student of Music, Dance and Drama at Makerere University. The two got married in 2011 at Rubaga Cathedral in Kampala after living together for 10 years. They have four children. She is a member of the Roman Catholic Church in Uganda.

== Awards ==
Barbara was awarded for her vocational Service Award by the Bugolobi Rotaract Club in 2018, she received an award for Excellence in Leadership award by The AidChild Leadership institute/Uganda. In 2020, she was awarded The teen's most favorite social media star by Teenz Awards 2020. She was also awarded for supporting teen mothers by The Remnant Generation, an award that counsels and supports teen mothers in Uganda.
