= Helen Nakimuli =

Ugandan politician (1985–2026)

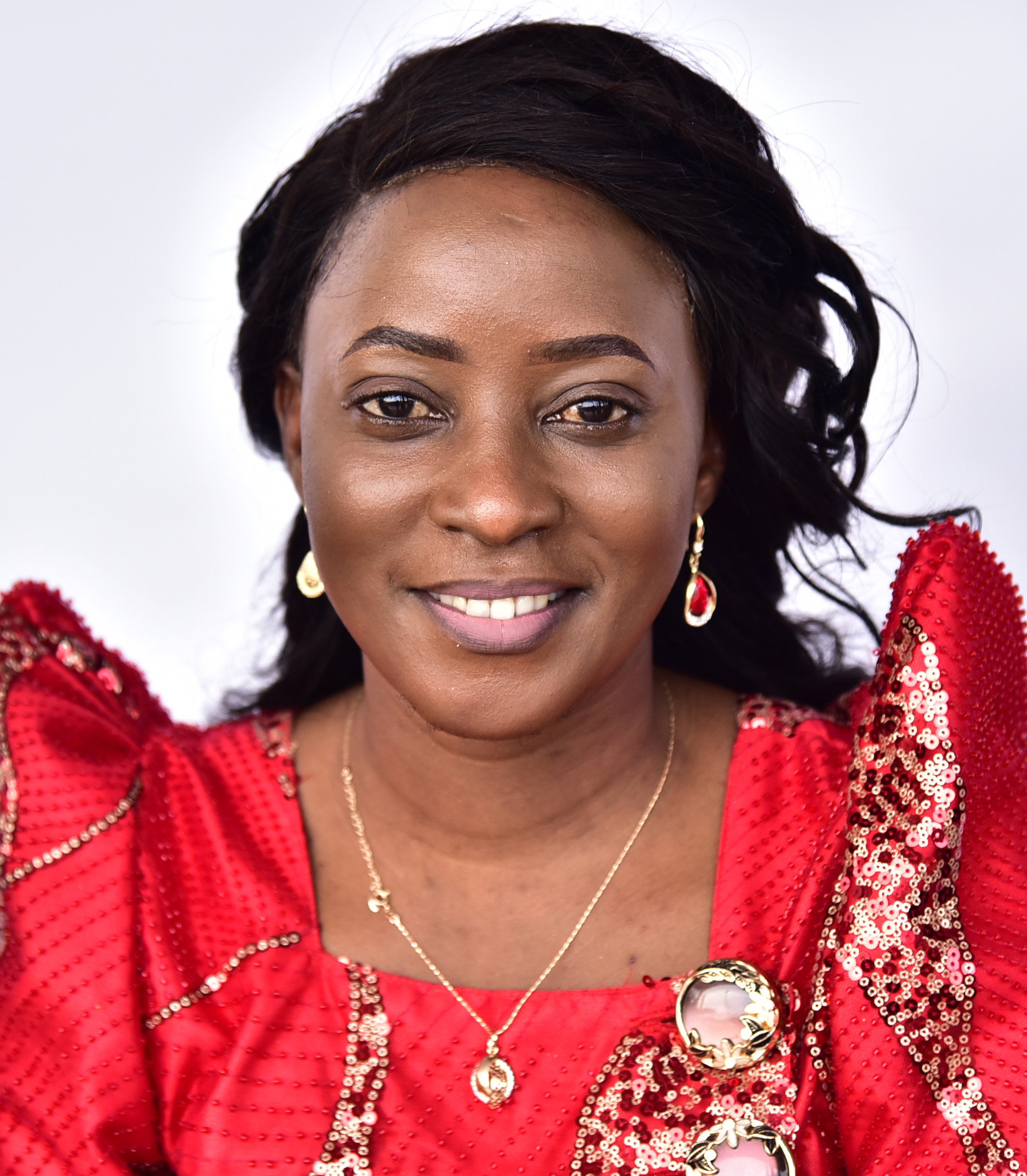
- Born: 2 July 1985; Lukuba village, Kyamuswa Sub-county, Kalangala District, Uganda
- Died: 19 April 2026 (aged 40); Alexandra Medical Center, Kampala, Uganda
- Education: Bukasa Primary School; Hormisdallen Primary School; Our Lady of Good Counsel; Saint Augustine Secondary School; Makerere University
- Occupations: Politician, legislator and volleyball player
- Known for: Volleyball and politics
- Political party: National Unity Platform (NUP)
- Children: 1 daughter
- Awards: An ecclesial medal by The Orthodox Pope and Patriarch of Alexandria and all Africa, His Divine Beatitude Theodore II in recognition of her exemplary service to the Orthodox Church, Uganda and humanity

Helen Nakimuli (2 July 1985 – 19 April 2026) was a Ugandan politician and volleyball player, who was a member of the eleventh Parliament of Uganda for Kalangala District. She was a member of the National Unity Platform (NUP).

== Early life and education ==
Nakimuli was born on 2 July 1985 in Lukuba village, Kyamuswa sub-county in Kalangala to a Greek Orthodox priest, Christopher Walusimbi, and Maria Nalwanga Walusimbi, a former Kalangala District councillor for Kyamuswa and Bubeke. Nakimuli started her education at Bukasa Primary school and Hormisdallen Primary School in Bweyogerere in Wakiso, then at Our Lady of Good Counsel in Gayaza for her Ordinary Level. For her Advanced level, she attended Saint Augustine secondary school in Wakiso, where she began her political career by becoming head girl. Following secondary school, Nakimuli was enrolled at Makerere University.

== Political career ==
Nakimuli defeated Aidah Nabayiga to become the member of parliament for Kalangala District. She was the Head of Communication and Anti-Corruption at NUP and the pearl of Kalangala.

She was elected as the Women's Representative for Kalangala District in the 12th Parliament of Uganda but died on 19 April 2026 before her swearing at Alexandria Medical Centre following reported complications from surgery

== Other works ==
Nakimuli was a volleyball player beginning in 1998. She was the captain of the ladies' volleyball team that went for East Africa Parliamentary Games in Arusha, Tanzania. She was a member of the COBAP Volleyball Club. She helped widows of Kalangala to get lawyers when other people want to take their late husbands' property. Nakimuli donated relief which included food, soap among other things to the elderly people in Kalangala District. Nakimuli gave relief to the people of whose houses were burnt. Nakimuli appealed to the State minister for microfinance, Haruna Kyeyune Kasolo to include the island Districts of Buvuma and Namayingo in the list of Emyooga funds.

== Death ==
Nakimuli died at a health facility on Yusuf Lule Road in Kampala, on 19 April 2026, following an unsuccessful elective surgical procedure. She was 40 years. Her body was transported to Mulago National Referral Hospital for a post mortem examination.

Nakimuli was eulogized by parliament, the National unity platform, Kalangala district council and the Orthodox church as a vocal Member of parliament and committed Christian. She was laid to rest on 23 April 2026 in Luwero.

== Awards ==
Nakimuli was given an ecclesial medal by the Pope and Patriarch of Alexandria and all Africa, Theodore II of Alexandria, in recognition of her exemplary service to the Eastern Orthodox Church, Uganda and humanity.

== See also ==
- List of members of the eleventh Parliament of Uganda
- Shamim Malende
- Parliament of Uganda
- National Unity Platform(NUP)
