= Sitenda Sebalu =

Ugandan politician

Sitenda Sebalu is a Ugandan politician who served as the Member of Parliament for Kyadondo East Constituency in the 9th Parliament of Uganda. Sitenda lost a by-election in 2017 in which Bobi Wine was announced winner with a landslide victory.

In the 2021 Ugandan general election, Sitenda Sebalu again contested the parliamentary seat of Kyadondo East Constituency on behalf of the National Resistance Movement Party and lost to Muwada Nkunyingi of the National Unity Platform party, led by Robert Kyagulanyi Sentamu. Sitenda has since announced his retirement from elective politics.
