= Nancy Kalembe =

Ugandan politician (born 1980)

- Born: Nancy Linda Kalembe; 15 September 1980 (age 45); Iganga, Uganda
- Education: Mount Saint Mary's College Namagunga (Uganda Certificate of Education); Mariam High School (Uganda Advanced Certificate of Education); Makerere University (Bachelor of Population Studies)
- Occupations: Politician, businesswoman, news anchor
- Children: 2

Nancy Linda Kalembe (born September 15, 1980) is a Ugandan businesswoman and politician.

She ran as an independent for president of Uganda in the January 14, 2021 presidential election, in which she was the only female candidate, but lost to incumbent President Yoweri Museveni.

== Early life and education ==
Nancy Kalembe was born on September 15, 1980, and grew up in the Iganga District in Uganda's Busoga region. She was one of 18 children. Kalembe was born to George Patrick Bageya, who was the former local council V chairman of Iganga, and Aida Cissy Kubaaza. She studied at Mount Saint Mary's College Namagunga for her Uganda Certificate of Education and Mariam High School for her Uganda Advanced Certificate of Education. In 2007, she obtained a bachelor's in population studies from Makerere University.

She was also a student athlete at Makerere, and she qualified for the 2004 Summer Olympics as a track athlete, but, by her account, the government could not afford to bring all of the qualifying athletes to Athens.

== Career ==
=== Private sector ===
Before entering politics, Kalembe worked as an anchor for the Uganda Broadcasting Corporation and for banks and oil companies in Nigeria and Uganda.

In 2003, she became a contestant for Miss Uganda on a dare from friends, after having been labeled a tomboy throughout her life. She made it into the top five but did not win; however, she was voted Miss Intelligence, earning her a job with the radio station Sanyu FM.

Kalembe has also pursued film and television roles, and she appeared on The Apprentice Africa in 2008.

She is the founder of Spring Clean, a cleaning company, and the CEO of Mbalimbali Ltd, a Nakawa-based pineapple juice and jam-producing company.

=== Presidential campaign ===
In July 2020, Kalembe announced she would run for president in the 2021 Ugandan general election. She formally launched her campaign in Jinja in November 2020, running as an independent.

She was the only female presidential candidate in the 2021 election, becoming the fourth woman to run for president in the country's history. If she won her long-shot campaign, she would have become Uganda's first female president.

Her platform focused on anti-poverty and anti-unemployment programs, as well as health care and infrastructure. She cited former Uruguayan President José Mujica as a political inspiration.

Kalembe's campaign was plagued by financial problems. She received 38,772 votes, or 0.37 percent of the total, in the election, which was marked by conflict between incumbent President Yoweri Museveni and challenger Bobi Wine over the legitimacy of the vote.

She has announced plans to run again in the 2026 presidential election.

== Personal life ==
Kalembe married in 2007, but she and her husband later divorced. She has two children from that marriage. In an interview with a Ugandan media outlet during her presidential campaign, she said, "Africa has forgotten that African women are very strong whether we have a husband or not. ... I need God, not a husband, to give me identity."
