= Yogera =

- Directed by: Donald Mugisha
- Starring: Cleopatra Koheirwe; Mark Bugembe; Robert Kyagulanyi Ssentamu; Hellen Lukoma; Olot Bonny
- Release date: 22 June 2010
- Running time: 90 minutes
- Country: Uganda
- Languages: English, Luganda

Yogera (English translation is Speak) is a Ugandan drama film about a young deaf woman (Cleopatra Koheirwe), wandering the streets of Kampala from her home village in Ishaka after her hearing twin sister throws her out for embarrassing her. The film was directed by Donald Mugisha and premiered in Kampala on 22 June 2010.

== Synopsis ==
After the death of her mother, a deaf young woman flees from her rural home to visit her hearing sister in the city, but is shunned by her and has to brave the unknown situation alone.

== Cast ==
The cast of Yogera was led by Cleopatra Koheirwe who acted two roles in the film as both Hope, the deaf young woman and protagonist of the film and as G.G, her hearing twin sister who shuns Hope away because of embarrassing her. The rest of the cast is made of celebrities.

- Cleopatra Koheirwe as Hope/G.G
- Mark Bugembe
- Bobi Wine
- Hellen Lukoma
- Olot Bonny
