= James Mamawi =

Ugandan politician

- Mamawi
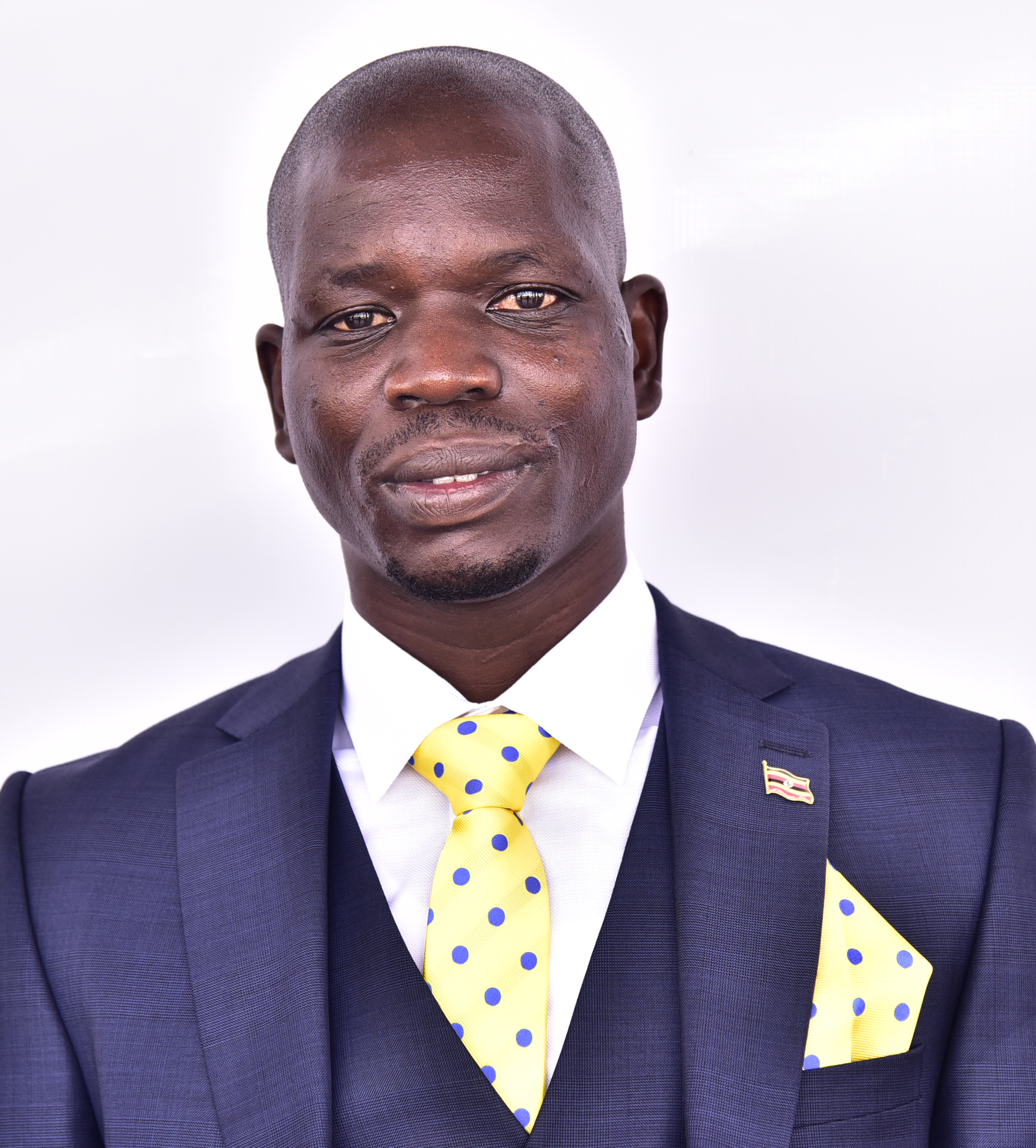
- Mamawi James
- Born: James Mamawi; September 29, 1988 (age 37); Adjumani district
- Citizenship: Ugandan
- Education: Bachelors of Agribusiness Management
- Occupation: Politician
- Political party: National Resistance Movement (NRM)
- Parents: Brani Festo (father); Jovita Chandiga (mother)

James Mawawi (born September 29, 1988) is a Ugandan politician and a member of Ugandan Parliament representing Adjumani East County. He was elected to the parliament on the ticket of National Resistance Movement (NRM). In the eleventh parliament, he serves on the Committee on Presidential Affairs.

== Life and education ==
Mawawi was born in Itirikwa sub-county, Adjumani district to Brani Festo and Jovita Chandiga. He is married to Stella Komouo Mamawi with four children. He began his early education at Subbe Primary School and attended Monosbala Secondary School and St Benard's College in Masaka district for his secondary school education. He holds a diploma in Agribusiness Management and a bachelor's degree in Agriculture and Rural Innovation from Makerere University.

== Political career ==
Mawawi started his political career as a district councilor representing Itirikwa sub-county in the district council. He ran for the Adjumani East County seat in the parliament in the 2021 parliamentary election and won.

== Electoral history ==
2021 Ugandan general election, Adjumani East county
Party	Candidate	Votes	%
NRM	James Mamawi	12,014	46.59%
Independent	Angel Mark Dulu (I)	10,728	41.60%
Independent	Peter Langi	1,722	6.67%
Independent	Daniel Anyama	933	3.61%
FDC	Lawrence Dulu Adrawa	390	1.51%
Total votes		25,787	100%
