= Harriet Businge =

Ugandan politician and teacher (born 1980)

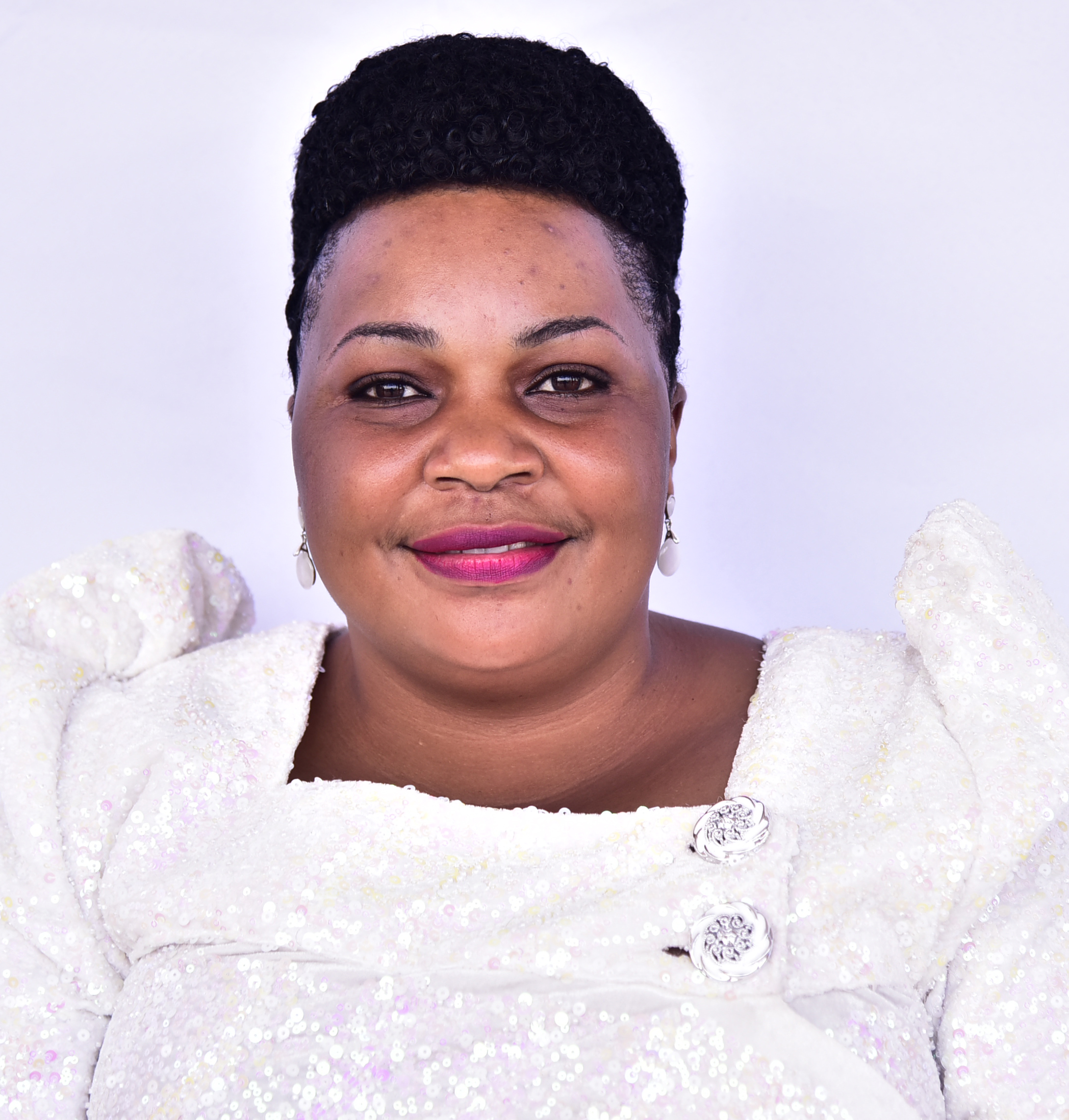
- Born: 12 October 1980 (age 46)
- Education: Bachelor of Education
- Occupations: Teacher, legislator
- Title: Member of Parliament for Hoima District
- Political party: NRM

Harriet Businge, commonly known as Baby Face, (born 12 October 1980) is a Ugandan professional teacher, politician and legislator.

== Background ==
Busingye represents the people of Hoima district as District woman representative in the parliament of Uganda. She entered parliament after winning the 2019 Hoima woman MP by-election where her main competitor was Asinansi Nyakato of the Forum for Democratic Change (FDC). She is a member of the National Resistance Movement, the party in political leadership in Uganda under the chairmanship of Yoweri Museveni, president of the Republic of Uganda. Towards the 2021 Uganda general elections, she lost the NRM flag bearer election to Beatrice Wembabazi and contested as an independent candidate in the General elections.

In the January 2026 general elections he contested as an independent candidate but lost to Beatrice Wembabazi of the National Resistance Movement (NRM) who serves in the 12th parliament (2026-2031) as the woman representative for Hoima district.

== Education ==
Businge started her primary school education in Kikangara primary school sitting her Primary leaving examinations (PLE) in 1992, she later enrolled at Kyebambe Girls secondary school in Fortportal Kabarole district where she did her Uganda Certificate of Education in 1996. She later joined National teachers college Masindi where she graduated with an Ordinary Diploma in education in 2001 and later in life she joined Nkumba university where she graduated with a Bachelor of Education in 2007.

== Career ==
Harriet started out her career as a director, Good Samaritan nursery and primary school in 1995, and from 2005 up to date is the director Multi constra engineering works limited. from 2007 to 2009, she acted as minister of education, youth and sports of the kingdom of Bunyoro Kitara in western Uganda, she is the executive director of the Kabalega education fund scheme a position she has held from 2009. She was a community health and self help mobiliser of Hoima district in 2011. from may to September 2018, she was Resident District Commissioner Sembabule district and has been a Member of Parliament of Uganda from September 2019 up to date.

== Controversy ==
During the National Resistance Movement(NRM) party primaries in Hoima district, Businge was accused of attacking her main rival in the Woman MP race Beatrice Wembabazi. Businge's campaign team allegedly attacked Wembabazi at Runga landing site and in the scuffle that ensued, she sustained serious injuries on the head and went into coma. This prompted the National Resistance Movement (NRM) party electoral commission chairperson Dr. Tanga Odoi to halt the electoral process.
