= Free Bobi Wine =

Freedom campaign

The Free Bobi Wine campaign was a trend mainly born on social media that advocated for the release of Ugandan opposition politician Bobi Wine from incommunicado detention by the Ugandan Government in Arua in 2018.

== Background ==
In 2018, a by-election was held to elect a Member of Parliament for the Seat of Arua in Uganda. During the campaign period, a Ugandan politician who was then the leader of the People Power Movement in Uganda and a sitting Member of Parliament for Kyadondo East, traveled to the Arua region in Northern Uganda to lend support to Kasiano Wadri, a candidate for the parliamentary seat who would eventually emerge victorious.

Bobi Wine, was perceived to be drawing significant support for his preferred candidate, as opposed to the candidate backed by Yoweri Museveni, the incumbent President of Uganda. However, the situation turned violent when Bobi Wine was arrested on charges of allegedly stoning a presidential motorcade and being in possession of firearms.

In the ensuing chaos, Bobi Wine's driver, a man named Yasin Kawuma, was shot dead. Bobi Wine and a number of his associates were subsequently arrested and held incommunicado. Later, they were charged with various offenses in a military court located at the Makindye barracks in Kampala. This incident sparked widespread national and international concern, as well as calls for the release of the detained individuals.

== Activation ==
Prior to his arrest, a photograph was tweeted by Ugandan politician and leader of the People Power Movement, Bobi Wine, showing his driver shot dead in his Toyota Tundra car. In the tweet, he mentioned that he was hiding in a hotel room, while the military was searching for him. After an extensive search, Bobi Wine was found and reportedly beaten until he lost consciousness by the military before being taken to an undisclosed location where he was detained for several days.

Following the incident, the hashtag Freebobiwine was created and rapidly gained international recognition with the aim of pressuring the Ugandan government to reveal his whereabouts. The fear that he could have been killed in the commotion further heightened the international attention. Within a short time, the hashtag had become a global trend on social media. In an effort to address the growing concerns, the Ugandan government released a brief video of Bobi Wine to confirm his well-being to the public.

The incident also inspired some musicians such as Pallaso to create songs that served as their contribution to the campaign for Bobi Wine's release.

== Results ==
Following the international attention garnered by the campaign for his release, Bobi Wine was presented before a military court, where he faced a litany of charges including but not limited to insulting the president, possession of firearms, and treason. Although he was eventually released on bail, it was widely reported that his health had deteriorated significantly, and he was seen walking with the assistance of supportive equipment.

Subsequently, Bobi Wine's political prominence in Uganda soared, elevating him to the status of the leading opposition politician in the country. He later received medical treatment in the United States, and subsequently announced his candidacy for the Ugandan presidency in the 2021 General Elections.

In the said elections, Bobi Wine emerged as the runner-up to the incumbent President Yoweri Museveni, with a remarkable 37% of the total votes cast. However, the elections were widely criticized as neither free nor fair, with allegations of widespread voter intimidation, irregularities, and violence. Despite this, the incident served to enhance Bobi Wine's political profile and draw attention to the need for reform in Uganda's political landscape.
