= Sauda Kauma =

Ugandan politician

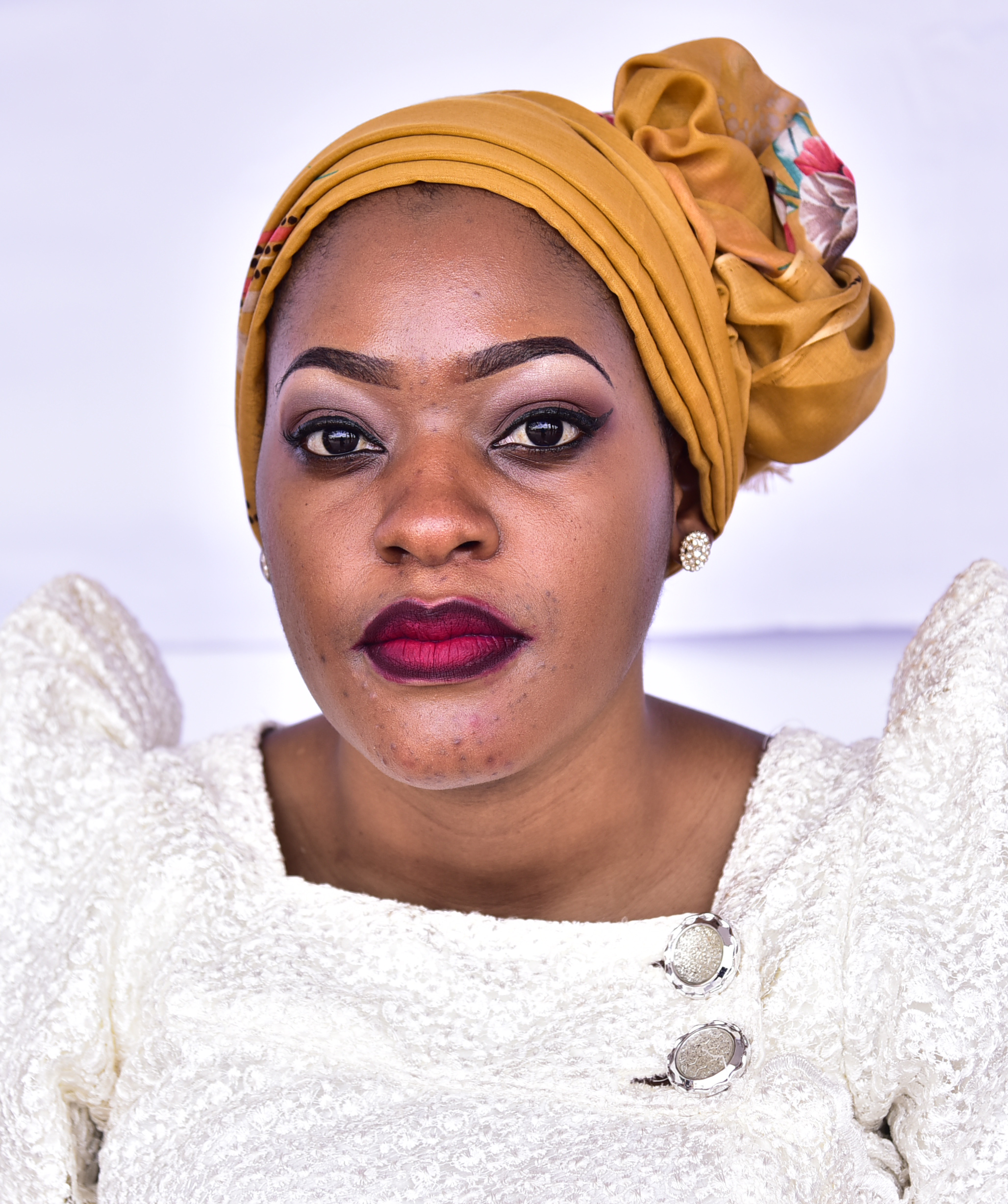

Member of Parliament
- In office 2021–2026
- Constituency: Iganga District

Personal details
- Born: Iganga District, Uganda
- Party: National Resistance Movement (NRM)
- Occupation: Politician
- Known for: Advocacy against domestic violence, support for health workers and farmers
- Committees: Committee on Rules, Privileges and Discipline

Sauda Kauma is a Uganda politician and a representative member of parliament for Iganga District in the eleventh parliament of Uganda. She is affiliated to the National Resistance Movement.

== Political career ==
Sauda sits on the Committee on Rules, Privileges and Discipline in the eleventh parliament of Uganda which is chaired by Hon. Abdu Katuntu

== Other works ==
Sauda donated Personal Protective Equipments and gas cylinders other to Health workers in Iganga District during the fight against COVID-19 in 2021. She also requested the Government of the republic of Uganda to elevate Iganga general hospital to a referral Hospital Status.

Sauda has spoken out against domestic violence in Iganga District. She also requested the president of Uganda Yoweri kaguta Museveni to set up a sugar cane processing factory in Iganga District to help out the farmers of the Busoga sub-region and that the president should set up a special fund to help bail out farmers who have gotten loans from the banks amidst the prices of sugar canes that were dropping.

== See also ==
1. List of members of the eleventh Parliament of Uganda
2. Harriet Businge
3. Parliament of Uganda
4. National Resistance Movement
