= Bobi Wine: The People's President =

2022 documentary film by Christopher Sharp and Moses Bwayo

- Theatrical release poster
- Directed by: Christopher Sharp; Moses Bwayo
- Produced by: John Battsek; Christopher Sharp
- Starring: Bobi Wine
- Cinematography: Sam Benstead; Moses Bwayo; Michele Sibiloni
- Edited by: Paul Carlin
- Music by: Dan Jones
- Production companies: Southern Films; Ventureland
- Distributed by: National Geographic Documentary Films
- Release dates: 1 September 2022 (Venice); 28 July 2023 (United States)
- Running time: 113 minutes
- Countries: Uganda; United Kingdom; United States
- Language: English
- Box office: $44,486

Bobi Wine: The People's President, previously titled Bobi Wine: Ghetto President, is a 2022 Ugandan-British-American documentary film written and directed by Christopher Sharp and Moses Bwayo. It chronicles the presidential campaign of popular Ugandan singer and opposition leader Bobi Wine as he challenged long-time ruler Yoweri Museveni.

The film won a Peabody Award at the 84th ceremony for "offering up a frank and urgent Portrait of an African artist driven to champion the power of the people in the face of a ruling class who'd rather silence him." It premiered out of competition at the 79th edition of the Venice Film Festival. It was nominated for Best Documentary Feature Film at the 96th Academy Awards.

== Release ==
This film was selected to be screened out of competition at the 79th Venice International Film Festival, where it had its world premiere on 1 September 2022. National Geographic, in partnership with Variance Films, gave the film a limited theatrical release beginning in New York and Los Angeles on 28 July 2023.

== Reception ==
=== Critical response ===
On the review aggregator website Rotten Tomatoes, 100% of 42 critics' reviews are positive, with an average rating of 8.1/10. The website's consensus reads: "Sobering and enlightening, this politically charged documentary takes a captivating look at the life of Bobi Wine: The People's President and his fight for democracy." Metacritic, which uses a weighted average, assigned the film a score of 72 out of 100, based on 13 critics, indicating "generally favorable" reviews.

=== Accolades ===
Award	Date of ceremony	Category	Recipient(s)	Result	Ref.
Academy Awards	10 March 2024	Best Documentary Feature Film	Moses Bwayo, Christopher Sharp and John Battsek	Nominated	
Cinema for Peace Awards	19 February 2024	Political Film of the Year 2024	Moses Bwayo, Christopher Sharp and John Battsek	Won	
British Independent Film Awards	3 December 2023	Best Documentary	Christopher Sharp, Moses Bwayo, John Battsek	Nominated	
British Independent Film Awards	3 December 2023	Best Editing	Paul Carlin	Nominated	
British Independent Film Awards	3 December 2023	Best Debut Director – Feature Documentary	Christopher Sharp	Nominated	
IDA Documentary Awards	12 December 2023	Best Feature Documentary	Bobi Wine: The People's President	Won	
Peabody Awards	June 9, 2024	"Offering up a frank and urgent portrait of an African artist driven to champion the power of the people in the face of a ruling class who’d rather silence him"	Bobi Wine: The People's President	Won	
