= Joseph Kabuleta =

Ugandan politician (born 1972)

Joseph Kizza Kabuleta
- Born: Joseph Kizza Kabuleta; March 17, 1972 (age 54); Nairobi, Kenya
- Education: Namilyango Junior School; Namilyango College; Mbale Technical College
- Occupations: Journalist, sports analyst, pastor, politician
- Years active: 1997–present
- Known for: Financial Liberation campaign
- Political party: Independent (2021)
- Other political affiliations: National Economic Empowerment Dialogue (NEED)
- Spouse: Rebecca Suubi Kabuleta
- Children: 4

Joseph Kizza Kabuleta (born 17 March 1972) is a Ugandan journalist, sports analyst, pastor and politician who contested for the office of the president of Uganda in the 14 January 2021 presidential poll as an independent candidate. He is well known for vocally criticizing the government and its systems and strongly articulating his campaign message of Financial Liberation.

He was arrested after publishing a Facebook article that criticized the President's son, General Muhoozi Kainerugaba, and detained for four days in a government torture house.

His retelling of his experience in the media was rebuffed and denied by the government. However, several critics of the government had been arrested and tortured prior to him confirming that the state does indeed torture independent and vocal opposition voices such as Dr Stella Nyanzi, political activist and feminist.

== Early life and education ==
Kabuleta was born in Nairobi, Kenya, to Margaret and John Kabuleta as the ninth of 12 children. His father is of the Munyoro tribe from Hoima, Uganda, and his mother is a Kenyan belonging to the Kikuyu tribe. Kabuleta was raised in Rubaga, Kampala before his family moved to his father's home town of Hoima, Uganda. He attended Namilyango Junior School and Namilyango College for his O and A- Level certificates. He enrolled for a diploma in Civil Engineering from Mbale Technical College. After graduation from the diploma program, he joined The Crusader newspaper as a sports writer in 1997 rising to the position of a sports editor in 1998. As he progressed in journalism career, he enrolled in Makerere University, where he obtained a degree in Mass Communication. Following the folding up of The Crusader, he joined The New Vision as a reporter and later a columnist.

== Presidential campaign ==
In July 2020, Kabuleta announced his intention to run in the presidential elections in the 2021 presidential poll. His major campaign agenda was to help Ugandans regain control of their country and exploit the rich resources in it for their benefit. Despite COVID-19 restrictions and government threats as he campaigned around the country, Kabuleta managed to end his presidential bid with 45,424 (0.44%). He, alongside many opposition voices contested the results of the elections that put incumbent President Yoweri Museveni as winner of the elections. On 14 February, he filed an affidavit in support of Kyagulanyi's presidential petition in the Supreme Court challenging the election of Yoweri Museveni.

== COVID-19 Activism and N.E.E.D. Uganda ==
Uganda imposed lockdowns and curfew in early 2020 at the beginning of the COVID-19 pandemic and only eased them in January 2022 making it the longest running Covid restrictions of any country, The restrictions saw the rise of many critical voices including Joseph Kabuleta who called on government to open up schools and places of worship that were categorized as 'super spreaders' arguing that the lockdowns did not benefit Ugandans, especially the majority who struggle to put meals on their table but did benefit the rich. He was also against mandatory vaccination arguing that Ugandans must be given a choice due to the vaccines being in the trial stages and not been proven effective as of October 2021. He set up a website to encourage Ugandans who had experienced negative effects of the vaccine to tell their story

== N.E.E.D. Uganda ==
On 28 September 2021, Joseph Kabuleta launched his political movement National Economic Empowerment Dialogue (NEED) which will address a number of issues in the country both economically and politically. While at the launch that consisted of influential political, social and economic leaders with no particular political alliance, Kabuleta expressed his desire "to empower citizens to dominate the narrative on the way forward, especially regarding the politics and economic matters concerning the country. Arguing that “the people who have held us captive seek to control not just our wealth, but also our conversation,” the man from Bunyoro rallied Ugandans “never [to] let them [those in power] dominate the narrative.” Unlike ROCK Uganda (Reclaiming Our Country and Kin) strategy, his political slogan for the 2021 Presidential elections, NEED Uganda with Joseph Kabuleta as the Principal at the helm has divided Uganda into 17 regions which the influential members of his team will be tasked to oversee the change of narrative amongst Ugandans around the country.

== Personal life ==
In July 2017, Joseph Kabuleta married his long time love Rebecca Suubi Kabuleta in a lavish invite-only exclusive function. Together they have two children. They are both loyal followers of Prophet Elvis Mbonye. He also has two children from his first marriage, which ended due to irreconcilable differences.

== Bibliography ==
The Rich Man Virus Publisher: Evangel Publishing House; 1st edition (20 March 2015) ISBN 9966202447 ISBN 978-9966202444

Strength Of Character Publisher: CreateSpace Independent Publishing Platform; 1st edition (14 December 2017) ISBN 1981845437 ISBN 978-1981845439
