= Fred Mwesigye =

Ugandan politician and military officer (born 1956)

Colonel (Retired) Fred Mwesigye
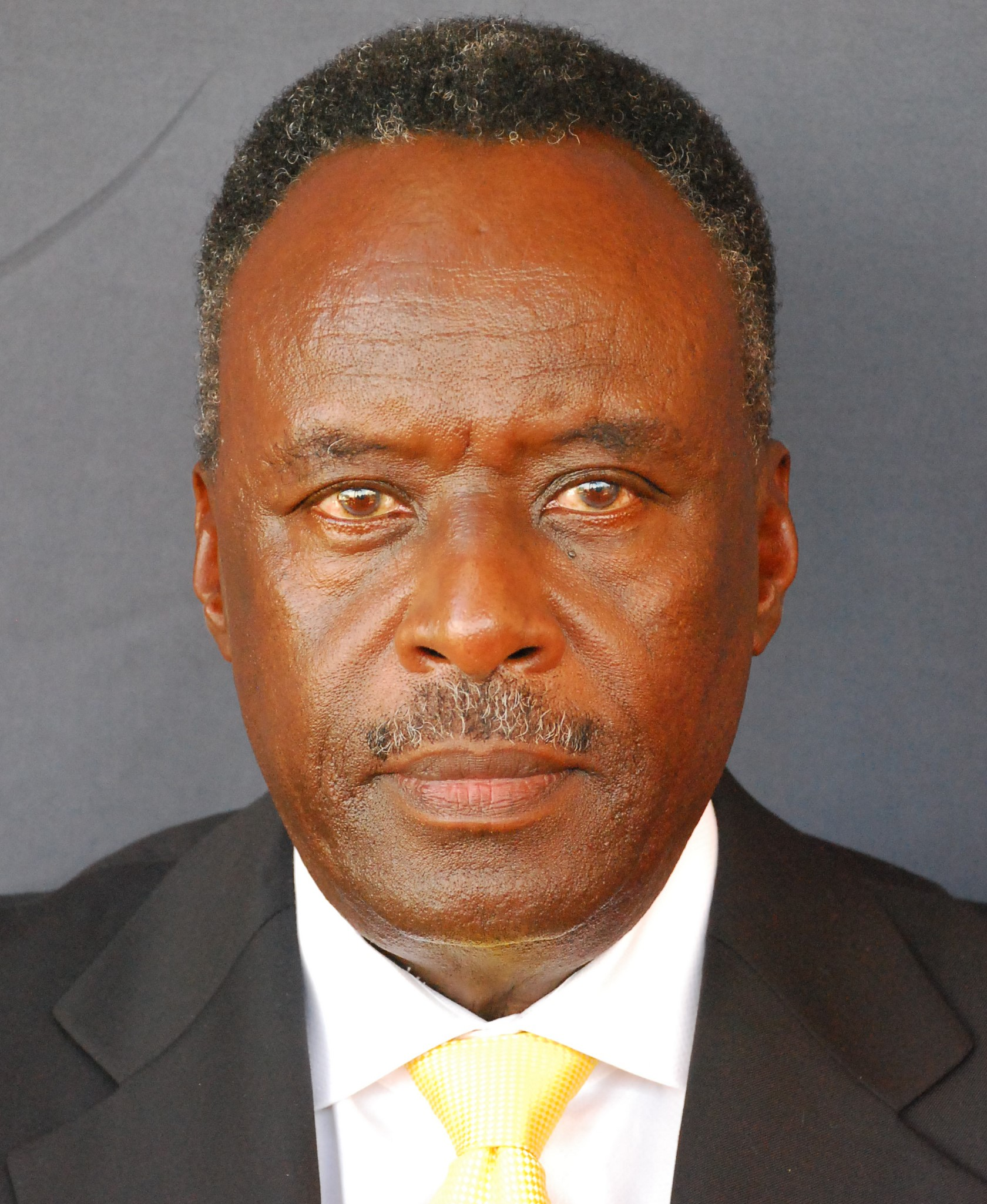
- Born: September 9, 1956 (age 70); Nyabushozi, Kiruhura District, Uganda
- Education: Kazo Primary School; Makobore High School
- Alma mater: Makerere University
- Occupations: Diplomat, Politician & Businessman
- Political party: National Resistance Movement
- Spouse: Enid Mwesigye

Colonel (Retired) Fred Mwesigye is a Ugandan diplomat, retired military officer and politician. He serves as the High Commissioner of Uganda to Tanzania, effective December 2021, replacing Richard Kabonero.

He previously served as the elected parliamentary representative for Nyabushozi County in the 10th Parliament of Uganda (2016 - 2021), on the National Resistance Movement political party ticket.

Before that, he was a serving officer in the Uganda Peoples Defence Forces (UPDF) and in the National Resistance Army (NRA) that preceded it. He is a member of the original 41 combatants with 27 guns who started the NRA in February 1981 and waged the Uganda Bush War (1981 - 1986).

== Background and education ==
He was born in Nyabushozi County, in Kiruhura District on 9 September 1956. He attended Kazo Primary School before transferring to Makobore High School, in Rukungiri District for his secondary school education. He holds a Bachelor of Business Administration degree and a Master of Peace and Conflict Studies, both awarded by Makerere University, Uganda's oldest and largest public university.

== Career ==
He was a member of the 41 combatants who, with 27 guns started the NRA in February 1981. He quickly rose in rank and was appointed Commander of a fighting group of the NRA called Nkrumah, with an estimated size of 40 to 50 fighters. He was one of top 20 NRA commanders at the time the NRA captured Kampala, in 1986. Over the years, he has had a varied military career, including as General Manager at Luweero Industries, a subsidiary of National Enterprise Corporation (NEC) and as the Managing director of NEC, the business arm of the UPDF.

In 2010, he retired from the UPDF at the rank of colonel. He joined Uganda's elective politics and was elected member of parliament (MP) for Nyabushozi county in Kiruhura District, on the NRM political party ticket. He served in that capacity until 2021.

== Diplomatic career ==
In February 2022, he was vetted by the appropriate parliamentary committee and approved as High Commissioner to Tanzania, with concurrent accreditation to Mozambique, Comoros, Madagascar, Mauritius, Zambia and Malawi.

== Other considerations ==
He was among the members of the parliament who returned the COVID-19 USh20 million to the parliamentary commission account at Bank of Uganda. He once said that when president Yoweri Museveni steps down as a president, term limits will be restored.
