= 2021 Ugandan general election =

- 14 January 2021
- Presidential election
- Registered: 18,103,603
- Turnout: 59.35% (▼8.26pp)
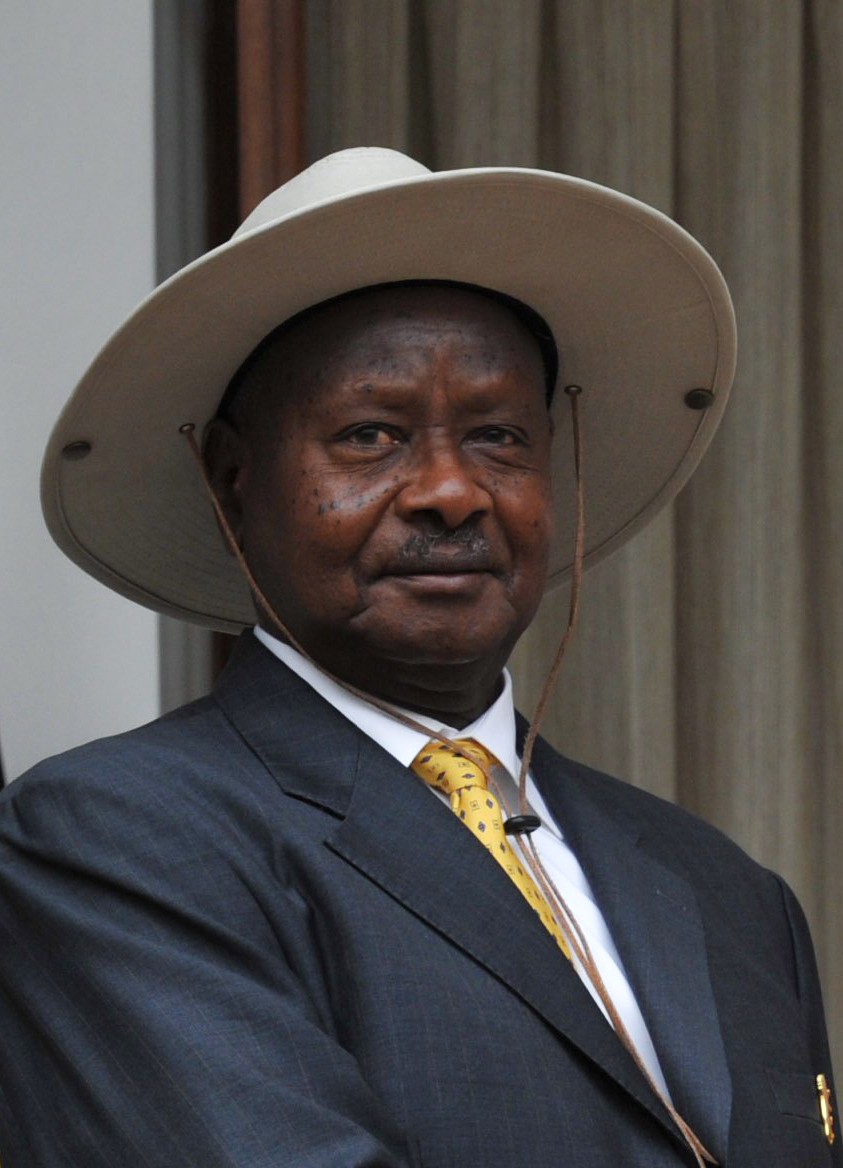

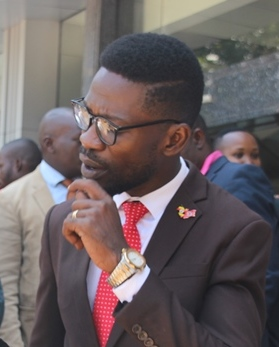
Nominee	Yoweri Museveni	Bobi Wine
Party	NRM	NUP
Popular vote	6,042,898	3,631,437
Percentage	58.38%	35.08%
- Results by district: Museveni: 45–50% 50–55% 55–60% 60–65% 65–70% 70–75% 75–80% 80–85% 85–90% 90–95% >95% Wine: 45–50% 50–55% 55–60% 60–65% 65–70% 70–75% 75–80%
President before election
Yoweri Museveni
NRM
Elected President
Yoweri Museveni
NRM
- Parliamentary election
- All 529 seats in Parliament; 265 seats needed for a majority
Party	Leader	Vote %	Seats	+/–
NRM	Yoweri Museveni	41.60	336	+43
NUP	Bobi Wine	13.48	57	New
FDC	Patrick Oboi Amuriat	7.29	32	−4
DP	Norbert Mao	2.45	9	−6
UPC	Jimmy Micheal Akena	1.80	9	+3
JEEMA	Asuman Basalirwa	0.25	1	+1
PPP	Jaberi Bidandi Ssali	0.10	1	+1
Independents	–	32.18	74	+8
This lists parties that won seats. See the complete results below.
Speaker of Parliament before	Speaker of Parliament after
Rebecca Kadaga; NRM	Jacob Oulanyah; NRM

General elections were held in Uganda on 14 January 2021 to elect the President and the Parliament. The Electoral Commission announced Incumbent President Yoweri Museveni, the incumbent ruling since 1986, as the winner with 59% of the vote, although the U.S. State Department qualified the electoral process as "fundamentally flawed" and Africa Elections Watch said they observed irregularities. The official voter turnout was 57% but was questioned as 409 polling stations were reported as having 100% voter turnout.

== Electoral system ==
The President of Uganda is elected using the two-round system, with candidates needing to receive at least 50% of the vote to be elected in the first round. Chapter 142 of the Presidential Elections Act of 2000 stipulates that presidential candidates must be a citizen of Uganda by birth and be qualified to be an MP. Candidates are also required to be of sound mind and have no formal connection with the Electoral Commission of Uganda. Term limits were abolished in 2005. The elections are supervised by the Electoral Commission of Uganda.

The Parliament of Uganda has a total of 529 seats, including 353 representatives elected using first-past-the-post voting in single winner constituencies. Using the same method, 146 seats reserved for women are filled, with one seat per district. Finally, 30 seats are indirectly filled via special electoral colleges: 10 by the army, 5 by youths, 5 by elders, 5 by unions, and 5 by people with disabilities. In each of these groups, at least one woman must be elected (at least two for the army group).

== Presidential candidates ==
Eleven candidates were registered to contest the election.

1. Yoweri Museveni, National Resistance Movement
2. Bobi Wine, National Unity Platform
3. John Katumba, Independent
4. Willy Mayambala, Independent
5. Fred Mwesigye, Independent
6. Henry Tumukunde, Independent
7. Joseph Kabuleta, Independent
8. Nancy Kalembe, Independent
9. Patrick Oboi Amuriat, Forum for Democratic Change
10. Mugisha Muntu, Alliance for National Transformation
11. Norbert Mao, Democratic Party

== Campaign ==
Campaigning was stopped in Mbarara, Kabarole, Luweero, Kasese, Masaka, Wakiso, Jinja, Kalungu, Kazo, Kampala City and Tororo on 26 December 2020. The government said it was to prevent spread of the COVID-19 pandemic, but critics said it was because of the popularity of the opposition in those areas. Crowds had previously been limited to 200 people.

When asked what he wanted to accomplish that he hadn't already done after 35 years in power, Museveni said he wanted to work for the economic integration in Africa, and to change the Ugandan culture of not working hard. He said in other countries, a harsh environment of competition pushed people to work, "but here, fools can survive".

== Conduct ==
=== International observers ===
The European Union did not deploy observers (EOM—election observer mission) because previous recommendations from their 2016 mission had been ignored. On 13 January 2021, the United States cancelled its observation of Uganda's presidential election, saying the voting will lack transparency and accountability.

=== Arrests of Bobi Wine ===
On 18 November 2020, opposition candidate Bobi Wine was arrested for allegedly violating COVID-19 protocols during his presidential campaign in Uganda. The National Unity Platform claimed that the continued arrests of its members were intended to stifle their ability to campaign rather than to follow COVID protocols. Supporters of Wine took to the streets of Kampala, clashing with security forces. This led to violent protests in which 100 people died and more than 500 were injured.

Wine was arrested again on 30 December on Kalangala Island, where a rally he was holding was cut short by police. Police broke up the rally using tear gas and Wine was put under house arrest at his home in Kampala. During his campaign, several aides, bodyguards and members of his entourage were arrested, jailed and killed.

=== Social media and internet block ===
On 13 January 2021, a day before the elections and a day after Facebook closed "fake" accounts it said were linked to the government, the communications regulator in Uganda ordered all telecoms firms to block access to social media and messaging apps in retaliation. The Ugandan government denied the charges and accused Facebook of meddling in the election saying "I think they are playing the usual games, we know that they have a side in this election perhaps."

At 5 pm on 13 January, the government ordered a complete internet shut-down, which came into effect at 7 pm. Amnesty International's deputy regional director condemned the move, saying that it was "clearly intended to silence the few accredited election observers, opposition politicians, human rights defenders, activists, journalists, and bloggers who are monitoring the elections".

=== Allegations of fraud ===
On 15 January (the day after the election), Bobi Wine announced that Ugandan security forces had surrounded and breached his compound after he had alleged that the elections had been "marred by fraud and violence". Wine said he had video proof of voting fraud and would share the videos as soon as internet connections were restored. He accused Museveni of fabricating the results and called the poll "the most fraudulent election in the history of Uganda... The entire process has been conducted in [the] dark and it lacks transparency," Katana, head agent of Bobi Wine's National Unity Platform, said "From the beginning, we were assured by the electoral commission that each candidate or their agents will receive copies of the results from the districts before they are transmitted to the national tally centre, so we are able to verify when they are reading here – and that was not done." On February 1, the legal team for opposition leader Bobi Wine filed a Supreme Court lawsuit, asking it to declare President Yoweri Museveni's re-election rigged. George Musisi, a member of Wine's legal team, said that the National United Platform (NUP) had amassed "glaring evidence" proving that the election result was invalid. "There was outright ballot-stuffing, there was intimidation of NUP agents and supporters, some were arrested on the eve of [last month's] election, there was pre-ticking of ballots," said Musisi.

== Results ==
=== President ===
Justice Simon Mugenyi Byabakama, chair of the Electoral Commission, declared Museveni the winner of the presidential election on 16 January, stating that he won almost 59% of the vote, with Wine taking 35%. Voter turnout was 57%. Byabakama said that it had been a peaceful election. Speaking before the results were announced, Wine told reporters that it was "the most fraudulent election in the history of Uganda" and also accused Museveni of putting him "under siege", as security forces surrounded his home. Museveni denied these claims in a televised address after being proclaimed the winner, saying that the votes had been machine-counted and that it "may turn out to be the most cheating-free election since 1962". Byabakama challenged Wine to provide evidence for his allegations of fraud.

Candidate	Party	Votes	%
Yoweri Museveni	National Resistance Movement	6,042,898	58.38
Bobi Wine	National Unity Platform	3,631,437	35.08
Patrick Amuriat	Forum for Democratic Change	337,589	3.26
Mugisha Muntu	Alliance for National Transformation	67,574	0.65
Norbert Mao	Democratic Party	57,682	0.56
Henry Tumukunde	Independent	51,392	0.50
Joseph Kabuleta	Independent	45,424	0.44
Nancy Kalembe	Independent	38,772	0.37
John Katumba	Independent	37,554	0.36
Fred Mwesigye	Independent	25,483	0.25
Willy Mayambala	Independent	15,014	0.15
Total		10,350,819	100.00
Valid votes		10,350,819	96.34
Invalid/blank votes		393,500	3.66
Total votes		10,744,319	100.00
Registered voters/turnout		18,103,603	59.35
Source: Electoral Commission

=== Parliament ===
Party	Constituency			Women			Special Interests Groups			Total seats	+/–
Party	Votes	%	Seats	Votes	%	Seats	Votes	%	Seats	Total seats	+/–
National Resistance Movement	4,158,934	41.60	218	4,532,814	44.81	101	9,132	53.59	17	336	+43
National Unity Platform	1,347,929	13.48	43	1,607,425	15.89	14	110	0.65	0	57	New
Forum for Democratic Change	729,247	7.29	24	674,154	6.66	8	60	0.35	0	32	–4
Democratic Party	245,248	2.45	8	181,364	1.79	1	1	0.01	0	9	–6
Uganda People's Congress	180,313	1.80	7	229,884	2.27	2				9	+3
Alliance for National Transformation	72,018	0.72	0	82,318	0.81	0	13	0.08	0	0	New
Justice Forum	24,843	0.25	1	22,625	0.22	0				1	+1
People's Progressive Party	10,076	0.10	1							1	+1
Uganda Economic Party	6,199	0.06	0							0	New
Ecological Party of Uganda	4,287	0.04	0							0	New
Conservative Party	1,071	0.01	0							0	0
Social Democratic Party	719	0.01	0							0	0
Forum for Integrity in Leadership	122	0.00	0							0	New
Congress Service Volunteers Organisation	68	0.00	0							0	New
Uganda People's Defence Force							3,754	22.03	10	10	0
Independents	3,217,480	32.18	51	2,785,676	27.54	20	3,972	23.31	3	74	+8
Total	9,998,554	100.00	353	10,116,260	100.00	146	17,042	100.00	30	529	+103
Source: Electoral Commission

== International reactions ==
Tanzania's president John Magufuli congratulated Museveni on his reelection victory. Kenya's President Uhuru Kenyatta congratulated Museveni, and in a statement published as a Facebook post, termed President Yoweri Museveni's re-election as a testimony of the confidence the people of Uganda have in his leadership. The post (specifically the part that mentioned Museveni having announced a cabinet shuffle) was flagged by Facebook and termed as "false information" and was subsequently deleted by the page administrators. The same congratulatory message was published on State House Kenya's Twitter handle and subsequently deleted. Abdel Fattah al-Burhan, the head of Sudan's Sovereignty Council and the nation's transitional head of state, also congratulated Museveni.

The United States and European Union called for an investigation into abuses of power by the government and violence during the election. The United States Department of State also called on Ugandan authorities to investigate election "irregularities," while the EU Council of Ministers stated that "opposition candidates were harassed by security forces, the media was suppressed by the government, and observers' offices were raided." The European Parliament passed a resolution on February 11, 2021 indicating that the election was not democratic and the security forces used excessive force. The resolution stated that it "expects all election challenges and complaints to be addressed in an independent and transparent manner". It also stated that hundreds of NUP supporters had been abducted by security forces operatives and an unclear number of them were "still being forcibly detained or are missing". It was later confirmed that many NUP members disappeared or were detained.
