= Bobi Wine =

National Unity Platform president (born 1982)

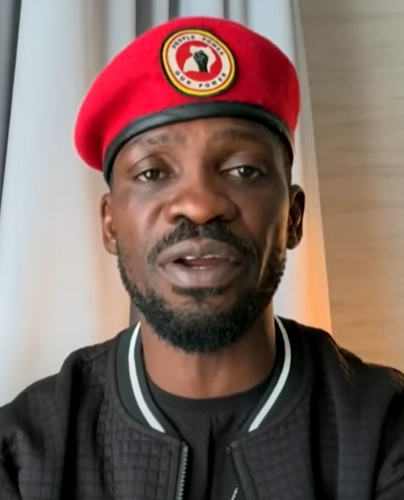
- Wine in 2024

President of the National Unity Platform
- Incumbent
- Assumed office 14 July 2020
- Preceded by: Moses Nkonge Kibalama

Member of Parliament for Kyadondo County East
- In office 11 July 2017 – 24 May 2021
- Preceded by: Apollo Katinti
- Succeeded by: Muwada Nkunyingi

Personal details
- Born: Robert Kyagulanyi Ssentamu; 12 February 1982 (age 44) Nkozi, Uganda
- Party: NUP
- Spouse: Barbie Kyagulanyi (m. 2011)
- Education: Makerere University; Cavendish University Uganda (LLB)
- Website: bobiwine.ug

Robert Kyagulanyi Ssentamu (born 12 February, 1982), commonly known by his stage name Bobi Wine, is a Ugandan activist, politician, and actor. He is currently the president of the National Unity Platform (NUP) a political party in Uganda opposed to Yoweri Museveni's government.

Wine is a former member of Parliament for Kyadondo County East constituency in Wakiso District, in Uganda's Central Region. In June, 2019, he announced his candidacy for the 2021 Ugandan presidential election. He participated in the 2021 election, in which, according to official results, he lost to incumbent Yoweri Museveni. As of January, 2026, he maintains that this result was fraudulent. On 14 December, 2021, he was placed under house arrest by the Government of Uganda. He continued to protest his arrest. He later went abroad, where he was involved in the creation of a documentary titled The corruption involved in the 2021 election. Upon his return to Uganda on 5 October, 2023, he was arrested. The Peabody Award-winning documentary film Bobi Wine: The People's President chronicled his journey during the 2021 election.

On 7 February 2025, the NUP held an open public debate for all 10 contestants in the 2025 Kawempe North by-election, a first for Uganda. The debate was streamed live on social media. On 25 June, 2025, Wine officially filed for the NUP's presidential flagbearer in the 2026 general elections in Uganda, describing the bid as a continuation of his "unfinished mission" and urged citizens to support a "protest vote" to end decades of political repression. One day after the general election, the NUP alleged that Museveni sent an army helicopter to arrest Wine as part of a larger military order to suppress his supporters using "snatch squads" operating on the streets. Wine reported that he escaped the raid on his compound. As of mid-March 2026, he is based outside Uganda.

== Early life and education ==
Robert Kyagulanyi Ssentamu, commonly known as Bobi Wine, was born on 12 February, 1982 to the Jackson Willington Ssentamu in a family of 34. He was born in Nkozi Hospital, where his mother, Margaret Nalunkuuma worked as a midwife. He grew up in the Kamwokya slum in the northeastern part of Kampala, the capital city of Uganda.

Wine attended Kitante Hill School, where he attained his Uganda Certificate of Education in 1996, as well as Kololo Senior Secondary School, where he attained his Uganda Advanced Certificate of Education in 1998. He then attended Makerere University in Kampala, where he studied music, dance, and drama, graduating with a diploma in 2003. In 2016, he joined the International University of East Africa for a Bachelor of Laws degree. Following the advice of his constitutional law lecturer, David Lewis Rubongoya, he transferred from IUEA, which was not fully accredited to teach law at the time, to Cavendish University, which was already accredited. He graduated from Cavendish University in August 2024.

== Entertainment career ==
=== Music career ===
Wine and Mugisha Fadhalmul Toto started their career in the early 2000s, and adopted the stage name BobiRob and pr Toto, akin to his Christian given name, Robert, taking inspiration from Bob Marley, who was also named Robert. He later adapted the stage name Bobi Wine.

Some of his first singles, "Akagoma", "Funtula", and "Sunda" (featuring Ziggy D) brought him success in the Ugandan music scene. His music has been characterized as kidandali, reggae, dancehall, and afrobeat, often with a socially conscious message. He was the leader of the entertainment group famously known as the Fire Base Crew until its disbandment, after which he started a new group known as Ghetto Republic of Uganda. He has released more than 70 songs over 15 years. He also heads a music group called Fire Base.

In 2016, his song "Kiwani" was featured on the soundtrack for the Disney movie Queen of Katwe.

=== The Bobi Wine Edutainment ===
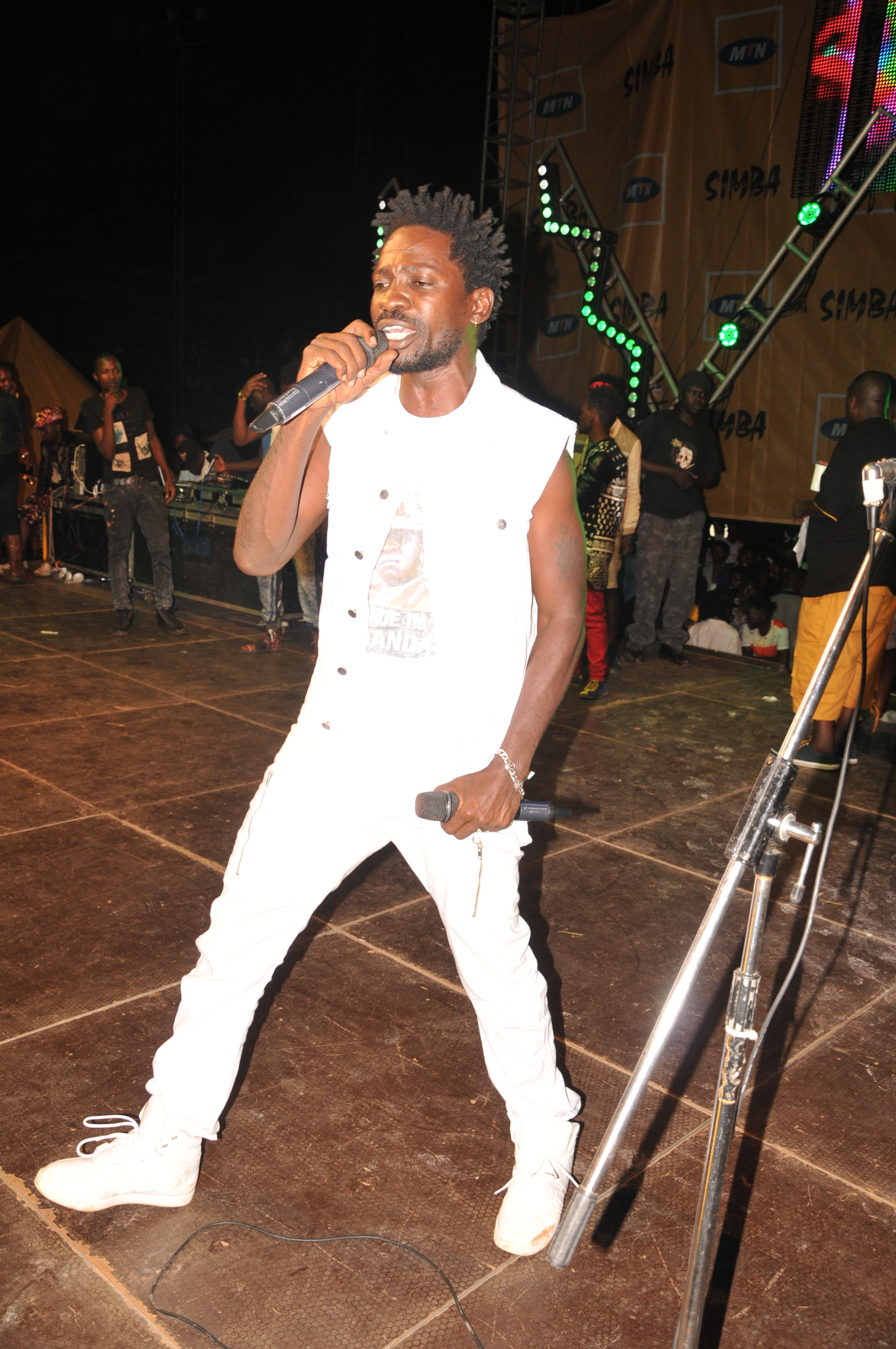
Wine singing in 2015

In 2006, Wine developed a musical style that combined entertainment with songs addressing political and social issues, particularly those affecting underprivileged communities. Some notable songs are "Ghetto" (featuring Nubian Li), "Obuyonjo," "Obululu Tebutwawula," and "Time Bomb."

The messages contained in these music projects were typically aimed at the government and its officials, urging them to take greater care of the underprivileged, as well as encouraging ordinary citizens to be more responsible in their communities. Topics covered include hygiene, maternal health, abortion, child pregnancies, child marriages, domestic violence and HIV/AIDS.

Wine's music often focused on the experiences of poorer communities and contributed to his public profile, leading to the nickname "Ghetto President" and increasing his prominence before his political career.

=== Film career ===
Wine is also a film actor, mainly starring in local Ugandan movies. In 2010, he was cast in Cleopatra Koheirwe's drama film Yogera. In 2015, he was cast in a lead role in the Twaweza-supported film Situka with Hellen Lukoma. He has also worked on a number of other films, including Divizionz.

Wine had his own reality TV show, The Ghetto President.

He appears in the 2022 documentary Bobi Wine: The People's President, directed by Moses Bwayo and Christopher Sharp. It was shot over five years and follows Wine and his wife on the campaign trail leading up to the 2021 presidential election. The documentary won a Peabody Award at the 84th ceremony in 2024 and was nominated for Best Documentary Feature at the 2024 Oscars.

== Political career ==
In April 2016, when Uganda's only radiotherapy machine in Mulago broke down, Wine took a leading position in widespread public anger at the slow official response and posted a critique of the government's handling of public health care, challenging the country's leaders to make better use of citizens' taxes.

Throughout the 2015–16 election period, Wine refocused his messages to call for tolerance of different views. Wine's public calls for calm activism during the 2016 election, with songs such as "Dembe", provoked mixed reactions from different political interests in Uganda. During this period, the Uganda Communications Commission denied that it had banned "Dembe" from Ugandan radio. Three months after the election, the U.S. Ambassador to Uganda Deborah R. Malac invited Wine to a formal embassy event and commented that he was a positive influence for local youth.

When the Ugandan government turned off social media during the 2016 election, Wine used a virtual private network to post his defiance to the communications shutdown on his Facebook page while also pointing out that the government continued to use social media during the shutdown they initiated. Wine was later chosen as a panellist to speak about freedom of expression on World Press Freedom Day in Kampala in May 2016. In March 2016, he defended the right of his artistic rivals to express views that Wine himself does not support.

In April 2017, Wine announced his candidacy for parliament in a by-election for Kyadondo County East constituency. His door-to-door walking campaign attracted attention both in Uganda and abroad. He won the contest by a wide margin, beating two seasoned candidates: Sitenda Sebalu of the ruling National Resistance Movement (NRM) party and Apollo Kantinti of the main opposition party Forum for Democratic Change (FDC).

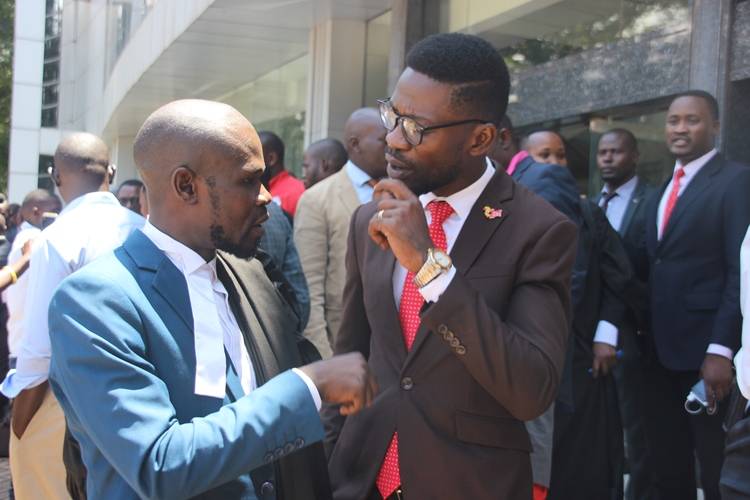
Wine and Nalukola

In 2018, Wine gained increasing political prominence after campaigning for candidates who won several by-elections against candidates from the NRM and FDC. Around this time, he birthed and popularized the "People Power Our Power" slogan, which would become a strong force in the opposition structure against the NRM government.

=== Arua by-election incident ===
On 14 August 2018, supporters of the independent candidate for parliament Kassiano Wadri allegedly obstructed and attacked President Museveni's convoy in the northern town of Arua, near Gulu. Museveni's motorcade was allegedly pelted with stones, leading to clashes between security forces and protesters. Later, Wine, an outspoken critic of Museveni, revealed through a social media post that police had intentionally shot at his vehicle, killing his driver. Wine had endorsed Wadri's candidacy against the official pro-Museveni candidate in Arua. Museveni publicly blamed Wine for the incident.

Wine was arrested on 15 August 2018 for possible charges of unlawful possession of firearms and incitement to violence, after which he was brought in front of a military court and charged with the former the following day. It was reported that Wine appeared to have been beaten before appearing in court. Kampala Lord Mayor Erias Lukwago, a lawyer who has represented detained MPs, said that Wine was in a worrying state of health and needed urgent medical attention. The government has repeatedly denied allegations of torture. Ugandan opposition leader Kizza Besigye called a press conference, where he demanded the MP's immediate release.

With popular protests growing in Uganda demanding Wine's release, and heated discussions in the Ugandan Parliament, the Ugandan State prosecution withdrew the charges filed during Wine's second appearance in front of the General Court Martial in Gulu on 23 August 2018. The prosecution indicated it would further pursue possible charges in a civilian court for a possible trial of the MP. Upon release, Wine was rearrested and charged with treason in a civilian court. In September 2018, Wine was released on bail and travelled to the United States for medical treatment for injuries he allegedly received in custody. The Ugandan government banned his supporters from gathering on the day of his release, and on the day of his return from the United States. He eventually addressed his supporters in a gathering outside his home upon his return to Uganda on 20 September 2018.

In August 2019, Wine was charged with "intent to alarm, annoy or ridicule" President Museveni for his role in the Arua incident the previous year. The charges came a day after the death of Ziggy Wine, a fellow Ugandan musician and staunch critic of Museveni, who was kidnapped and tortured by unknown assailants.

=== Anti-social media tax protest ===
On 22 April 2019, Wine was detained while attempting to make his way to a planned concert at his private club in southern Kampala, which was cancelled by police. He was accused of leading a protest in the city the previous year without prior police authorization; the protest was held against the "social media tax" which took effect in July 2018. On 29 April 2019, on his way to the offices of the Criminal Investigations Directorate (CID) to honour a summons and provide a statement on the cancelled concert, Wine was again arrested and taken to Buganda Road Court, where he was charged with disobedience of statutory duty and remanded to Luzira Maximum Security Prison until his bail hearing on 2 May. In a statement the following day, Amnesty International demanded his immediate release and urged the Ugandan government to "stop misusing the law in a shameless attempt to silence him for criticizing the government." On the day of the hearing, which was conducted via video conferencing (the first time in the history of Uganda's justice system), Wine was granted bail and released from prison, with the court also barring him from holding unlawful demonstrations.

=== 2021 presidential election ===
On 24 July, 2019, Wine formally announced his bid to run for president in the 2021 general election. On 22 July, 2020, he announced that he had joined the National Unity Platform party, becoming elected its president and presidential flag-bearer in the upcoming February 2021 general election. Wine was formally nominated to run for the presidency on 3 Nov 2020. Shortly after his nomination, Wine was arrested by the Ugandan military.

In August 2020, Wine was dragged to court on charges of falsifying information, obtaining registration by false pretence and uttering false documents.

On 3 November 2020, Wine was arrested after his nomination to the election body for the upcoming general election was certified. A statement on his official Twitter account said he was violently arrested outside the nomination venue, temporarily blinded and brutalised by police and the military.

On 6 November 2020, he launched his campaign manifesto in Mbarara (western Uganda). The manifesto was originally planned to be launched at his NUP party offices, but state operatives prevented him from reaching them.

On 18 November 2020, Wine was arrested in Luuka District (Eastern Uganda) and detained at Nalufenya Police Station in Jinja for three days. He was accused of breaking COVID-19 capacity restrictions. His arrest was met by widespread demonstrations around the country, mostly in parts of Kampala, Masaka, Jinja, Mukono, Mbale and Wakiso. Although the Ugandan police alleged that only 54 people were killed, human rights activists put the figure at more than 100 murdered and several others injured. Over 2000 people were incarcerated during the subsequent protests.

Wine's bodyguard, Francis Senteza, was killed on 27 December 2020, after being run over by a truck belonging to the military police. He was attacked while helping to transport a journalist critically injured by tear gas during an earlier confrontation between the police and a group of Wine's supporters. Another journalist was also wounded in the incident.

On 16 January 2021, the electoral commission announced that Museveni had won re-election with 58.6% of the vote. Wine refused to accept the results, alleging that the election was the most fraudulent in Uganda's history.

Wine was placed under house arrest on 15 January, shortly after casting his vote for the presidential election. The military surrounded his home and did not let anyone in or out for several days, despite Wine claiming he had run out of food. The U.S. ambassador to Uganda, Natalie E. Brown was not allowed to visit or leave food for him as the military blocked the convoy. Wine was released on 26 January after the Ugandan High Court ordered security forces to end the house arrest. On 1 February, Wine challenged the 2021 elections in court, but later ordered his lawyers to withdraw the case citing bias from the judges, after photos were seen of the chief justice with President Museveni, who was the correspondent party to the lawsuit.

=== Tear gas injury ===
On Tuesday 3 September 2024, Wine was injured after being shot in his left leg with a tear gas canister by police during a confrontation in Bulindo, Kira in Wakiso District.

=== 2026 presidential election ===
Wine again sought to unseat Yoweri Museveni by running in the 2026 presidential elections.

On 24 September 2025, he was nominated as the National Unity Platform Presidency flagbearer by the Electoral Commission ahead of the 2026 general elections.

On 6 December 2025, Wine and several supporters and staff were attacked and beaten by security forces while campaigning in Gulu.

On 16 January 2026, Wine was reportedly abducted by Ugandan army forces following deadly protests after the election. However, Wine said that he was in hiding following a raid by security forces on his home. On January 17, Wine was declared to have lost the election with 24.72% of the vote. International observers denounced voter intimidation and accused the government of instilling fear. On 19 January, military commander Muhoozi Kainerugaba issued a 48-hour ultimatum for Wine's surrender. As of January 23, Wine was in hiding. Wine alleged that soldiers invaded his residence, held his wife Barbara Kyagulanyi at gunpoint, partially stripped her, choked her, and that she was subsequently hospitalized; the soldiers also took money, documents, and electronics.

On 14 March 2026, Wine announced he had fled the country, saying he had "some critical engagements outside Uganda" and that he planned to return "at the right time".

== Humanitarian work ==
Wine has participated in a number of community and charitable projects focused on public health and social welfare. In 2012, he started a campaign to promote more regular cleaning in hospitals, sanitation, garbage management, and hand-washing to prevent disease. A YouTube video from September 2012 shows him joining Kampala Lord Mayor Erias Lukwago in cleaning up Kamwookya, the slum neighbourhood where Wine grew up. The same year, he also donated funds to build pit latrines and construct a drainage channel in Kisenyi II, a Kampala slum that the New Vision described as being "characterized by filth, crowded shanty structures, poor sanitation and lack of basic social facilities." Wine explained that he embarked on the project "because these are my people, and no matter where I go, this will always be home."

He has also campaigned for malaria prevention, with donations to Nakasongola Health Centre, and references to the disease in his songs.

In August 2013, Wine visited the Bundibugyo Refugee Camp in Bundibugyo District, along with representatives from Save the Children, UNHCR, and the Red Cross, to deliver funds and supplies. The following month, he was named as a parenting ambassador by Twaweza, an NGO that focuses on education and citizen engagement in East Africa; his message in this partnership was to promote responsible parenting among his Ugandan fans. In an interview about the project, he said that "education is what will ultimately change the course of our country and as an artist and a father, I believe we can all make a difference in our children's learning."

In 2014, Wine was named as an ambassador for Save the Children's EVERY ONE campaign, joining a team of 14 Ugandan artists who recorded a special song and video about maternal and child health. Other leading artists in the video included Jose Chameleone, and Radio and Weasel, who made up the Goodlyfe Crew. Wine and his wife Barbara travelled to hospitals throughout Uganda, including Nakaseke Hospital, meeting with midwives and health workers to popularize the campaign. Save the Children also took him to other regions for the campaign, including Nyumanzi Refugee Settlement in north-western Uganda for South Sudanese people. Currently, Wine is the patron of a girls' and teen mothers' empowerment non-government organization called Caring Hearts Uganda, founded by his wife Barbie Kyagulanyi.

Wine was scheduled to perform a show in Dubai, United Arab Emirates on 8 October 2022, and the proceeds from the show were going to be used to repatriate Ugandans stranded in the United Arab Emirates. However, the show was cancelled by the United Arab Emirates government on unknown grounds and upon arrival in Dubai, Wine was detained at the airport for ten hours. He was later released and he spoke to his supporters.

== Controversies ==
Wine is often outspoken about political and social issues in Uganda, generating some controversy. Until January 2019, he had a long-standing feud with fellow Ugandan musician Bebe Cool, who has sung in support of President Museveni and the NRM, while Wine has supported opposition interests.

In July 2014, it was announced that Wine was to perform in the United Kingdom at The Drum Arts Centre in Birmingham and the Troxy in London. This led to calls for a ban because of his lyrics expressing opinions against homosexuality. Both venues subsequently cancelled Wine's appearances. In a May 2016 Twitter exchange with ULC Monastery LGBTI, an American Christian group that promotes tolerance toward the LGBT community, Wine suggested that he had moved away from his previous homophobic comments, but did not specifically state that his views on homosexuality had changed. In 2023, the United Kingdom's travel ban against Wine, imposed in 2014, was lifted.

In 2015, Wine publicly defended the Buganda kingdom's fundraising efforts when it was harshly criticized by the outspoken Sheikh Muzaata, stirring up a war of words. Wine has at times been known as Omubanda wa Kabaka (the King's Rogue) for his devotion to the Kabaka (King) of Buganda.

== Personal life ==
While studying at Makerere University, Wine met his wife, Barbara Itungo, also known as Barbie, who at the time was an S6 student at Bweranyangi Girls' Senior Secondary School. Their wedding took place in August 2011 after ten years of living together. They have four children. Wine and his family reside in Magere Village, Wakiso District, where he ensures they "go together to dig and get food, whenever we can. I do that because I want them to learn to live an ordinary life, not as a celebrity's children."

On 10 February 2015, Wine's father died after a lengthy battle with diabetes. The vigil and burial attracted hundreds of mourners including government officials and other celebrities. One month later, Wine released the song "Paradiso", about valuing your parents while they are still alive.

Wine was featured in the 2022 documentary film Bobi Wine: The People's President, which was nominated for Best Documentary Feature Film at the 96th Academy Awards. Wine is Catholic.

== Accolades ==
=== Awards and nominations ===
Sourcer:

Year	Award	Category	Nominee(s)	Result	Ref.
2005	Pearl of Africa Music Awards	Song of the Year	"Mama Mbiire" (with Juliana Kanyomozi)	Won	
2006	Pearl of Africa Music Awards	Best Afro Beat Single	"Bada"	Won	
2006	Pearl of Africa Music Awards	Artist of the Year	Bobi Wine	Won	
2006	Tanzania Music Awards	Best East African Album	Mama Mbiire	Nominated	
2007	Pearl of Africa Music Awards	Best Afro Beat Single	"Kiwani"	Won	
2007	Pearl of Africa Music Awards	Best Afro Beat Artiste/Group	Bobi Wine	Won	
2007	Kisima Music Awards	Best Song Uganda	"Bada"	Nominated	
2008	Pearl of Africa Music Awards	Best Afro Beat Artiste/Group	Bobi Wine	Won	
2009	MTV Africa Music Awards	Best Video	"Little Things You Do" (Wahu featuring Bobi Wine)	Nominated	
2013	HiPipo Music Awards	Artist of the Year	Bobi Wine	Nominated	
2013	HiPipo Music Awards	Best Male Artist	Bobi Wine	Nominated	
2013	HiPipo Music Awards	Best Ragga/Dancehall Song	"By Far"	Nominated	
2013	HiPipo Music Awards	Best Afrobeat Song	"Jennifer"	Won	
2018	Zzina Awards	Afro-Beat Song of the Year	"Kyarenga"	Nominated	
2018	Zzina Awards	Male Artiste of the Year	Bobi Wine	Won	
2018	Zzina Awards	Artiste of the Year	Bobi Wine	Nominated	
2018	Zzina Awards	Song of the Year	"Kyarenga"	Won	

=== Other honours ===
- 2018: Africanews Personality of the Year
- 2019: Foreign Policy Global Thinkers
- 2019: Rainbow/PUSH International Humanitarian Award
- 2019: Friedrich Naumann Foundation Africa Freedom Prize
- 2021: Wine was announced as the Outstanding Entrepreneurial Artist by Janzi Awards.
- 2022: Wine was named Ugandan honouree at the Forty Under 40 Africa awards in Accra Ghana alongside Brian Muhumuza Bishanga, producer Anko Ronie and Humphrey Nabimanya.

== Discography ==
As of 13 April 2026. Sources:

Albums

Title	Release date
Omwana Wabandi	4 May 2010
Wendi	7 April 2012
Sweet	23 March 2015
Uganda	9 June 2019
Caroline	5 June 2022
By Far	11 November 2025

Singles and extended plays

Extended plays
EP	Title	No. of songs	Total length	Release date
EP	Tata Wabaana	6	23:05	1 January 2005
EP	Kiwani	6	26:21	1 January 2007
EP	Ayagala Mulaasi	4	18:32	2 June 2009
EP	Mazzi Mawanvu	6	23:29	1 January 2010
EP	Akagoma	4	16:31	15 August 2010

Singles
Title		Length	Release date
Obululu		4:01	25 May 2015
Ndi Muna Uganda		4:17	23 May 2016
Freedom		4:00	1 November 2017
Kyarenga		3:22	12 May 2018
Tuliyambala Engule	With Nubian Li, King Saha, Irene Ntale, Irene Namatove, Pr Wilson Bugembe & Dr Hilder Man	4:42	5 January 2019
Afande		3:42	25 April 2019
Corona Virus		1:53	25 March 2020
Corona Virus Alert	With Nubian Li	1:56	27 March 2020
Tulonde		4:24	13 January 2021
Akatengo		3:39	16 May 2021
Akatengo		3:40	20 May 2021
Ogenda		5:45	20 December 2021
Nteredde	With Nubian Li	2:59	7 April 2022
Kasukali Keeko		3:29	5 June 2022
Osobola	With Nubian Li	3:48	5 June 2022
Tujune		4:04	24 June 2022
My Voice My Choice	With Nubian Li	1:40	22 August 2022
Nalumansii		3:43	3 April 2023
Nalumansi		3:43	12 April 2023
Labisa	With Zex Bilangi, Feffe Busi, Nubian Li & Sizza Man	4:21	24 April 2023
Everything is Gonna Be Alright		3:14	10 August 2023
Christmas Yomwaka	With Paddyman	4:19	14 November 2023
Christmas Yomwaka	With Paddyman	4:10	14 November 2023
Man & Woman	With Nubian Li	3:46	7 December 2023
Man & Woman	With Nubian Li	3:46	15 December 2023
Such A Beautiful Day	With World Funk Orchestra & Nubian Li	4:08	29 August 2024
D PTSD INTERLUDE	With Oxlade. Featured on Oxlade's OFA (Oxlade From Africa) album.	1:33	19 September 2024
Super Woman	With Nubian Li	3:26	25 May 2025
For Better For Worse		4:02	19 March 2026

== Filmography ==
- 2008: Divisionz
- 2010: Yogera
- 2015: Situka as Muganga
- 2016: Omubanda wakabaka (2012–2016 TV series)
- 2022: Bobi Wine: The People's President
