= National Unity Platform =

Ugandan political party

National Unity Platform Jukwaa la Umoja wa Kitaifa
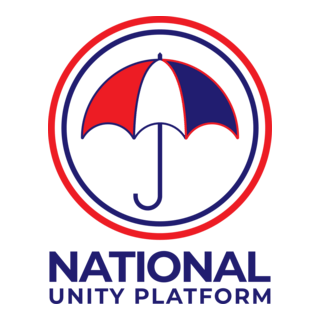
- Abbreviation: NUP
- Leader: Robert Kyagulanyi Ssentamu
- Secretary-General: David Lewis Rubongoya
- Spokesperson: Joel Ssenyonyi
- Founded: December 2004 (as the National Unity, Reconciliation and Development Party)
- Headquarters: Kamwokya, Kampala, Uganda
- Ideology: Progressivism; Social democracy Social liberalism
- Political position: Centre-left
- Colours: Red, white and navy blue
- Slogan: People power, Our power
- Parliament of Uganda: 57 / 529

Website
- nupuganda.org

The National Unity Platform (NUP; Swahili: Jukwaa la Umoja wa Kitaifa), formerly the National Unity, Reconciliation and Development Party (NURP), is a political party in Uganda led by Robert Kyagulanyi Ssentamu (also known as Bobi Wine). The NURP was led by Moses Nkonge Kibalama from December 2004 until July 2020. On 14 July 2020, Robert Kyagulanyi Ssentamu assumed leadership of the party and was declared the party flag-bearer for the 2021 presidential elections.

== Background ==
The NURP was formed in December 2004, headed by Moses Kibalama. For the next 16 years, he served as the president of the party.

In July 2017, Robert Kyagulanyi Ssentamu (Bobi Wine) was sworn in as the MP representing Kyaddondo East Constituency in the 10th Parliament (2016-2021). To win that constituency, he beat two seasoned politicians in a by-election: Sitenda Sebalu of the ruling National Resistance Movement (NRM) party and Apollo Kantinti of the main opposition party Forum for Democratic Change (FDC).

While running for the Kyaddondo East seat, Kyagulanyi was shunned by both the DP and FDC political parties, so he ran as an Independent candidate. He adopted the ‘People Power, Our Power’ slogan as his rallying call, leading to what is referred to as the People Power Movement in Uganda.

Since the formation of the People Power Movement in 2017, a number of legislators, including members of the ruling National Resistance Movement and opposition Forum for Democratic Change, have allied with People Power.

The People Power movement finally got a legally registered party NURP and changed the name to the National Unity Platform and on 22 July 2020, the founders of NUP, together with leading personalities from the People Power Movement, announced that Kyagulanyi had been elected President of NUP and presidential party flag bearer in the upcoming 2021 national elections.

The party is registered with the Uganda Electoral Commission. The party's symbol is an umbrella in red, white and blue surrounded by three circles in red, white and navy blue. The NUP symbol is fully gazetted by the Uganda Electoral Commission. On 28 July 2020, the party unveiled membership cards that cost only USh1,000 (about USD 0.27 or GBP 0.2), an amount they said did not discriminate against social class and would be affordable to every Ugandan.

On 3 August 2020, the party president announced five members of parliament who crossed that day to the National Unity Platform. These included John Baptist Nambeshe (NRM), Patrick Nsamba (NRM), Francis Zaake (Independent) and Busujju's legislator David Kalwanga (Independent). On 13 August 2020, sixteen more Members of Parliament, joined the NUP political party, crossing from the Democratic Party (DP). This brought the total number of MPs who have joined Kyagulanyi in NUP, during the first two weeks of August 2020 to twenty one (21).

On 14 January 2021, the general elections took place. According to a survey performed by Market Intelligence Group, Bobi Wine had the support of about 59% of the Ugandans. On 16 January the Electoral Commission announced, even before all the votes were counted, that Bobi Wine received 35.08% of the votes. This announcement was heavily criticized since there are 409 polling stations with a 100% turnout. Many videos of ballot box stuffing turned up. Other opposition leaders also stated that Bobi Wine had won and Museveni was falsely sworn in. Factchecker organisation Pesacheck published that Uganda has not held honest elections in over 30 years. On 9 February, the European Parliament passed a resolution stating that the elections were violent and neither free nor fair.

== Recent events ==
=== National Unity Platform petition to the electoral commission ===
On 17 September 2025, the National Unity Platform (NUP) petitioned the Electoral Commission (EC), objecting to what it described as the illegal exclusion of the party from discussions related to the National Consultative Forum (NCF) and the Inter-Party Organisation for Dialogue (IPOD).

The petition, addressed to EC Chairperson Justice Simon Byamukama and signed by NUP Secretary General David Lewis Rubongoya, highlighted repeated concerns by the party about being sidelined from engagements connected to the amended Political Parties and Organisations Act of 2005.

The NCF was created under the Political Parties and Organisations Act as a framework for registered parties to engage in dialogue and build consensus on national issues. Participation in IPOD was initially voluntary and structured as a company limited by guarantee. Following recent amendments, Parliament transformed IPOD into a statutory organ of the NCF, a change NUP criticized as rushed and lacking proper consultation.

According to Rubongoya, IPOD in its former legal form ceased to exist after the amendment, and new statutory processes were required for political parties to confirm their participation. He also stated that although NUP was challenging the amendment in court, the party expected the EC to ensure that any ongoing discussions were lawful and inclusive.

The petition was submitted shortly before an IPOD summit scheduled for 18 September 2025 to deliberate on issues arising from the amendment. NUP argued that its exclusion from the meeting undermined its role as a parliamentary political party.

== Post 2026 elections leadership changes ==
Party President, Bobi Wine fled the country shortly after the 2026 general elections for safety reasons citing a manhunt by security personnel. On March 14, 2026, he appointed the Deputy President for Northern Uganda, Dr. Lina Zedriga Waru as acting party President. After four months, John Baptist Nambeshe, member of parliament for Manjiya County, Bududa District and Deputy President for Eastern Uganda was appointed acting party President on July 17, 2026 replacing Dr. Zedriga.

== Election results ==
=== Presidential elections ===
Election	Party candidate	Votes	%	Result
2021	Bobi Wine	3,631,437	35.08%	Lost ✗ (results contested)
2026	Bobi Wine	2,741,238	24.72%	Lost ✗ (results contested)

=== Parliament of Uganda elections ===
Election	Party leader	Votes	%	Votes	%	Seats	+/–	Position	Government
Election	Party leader	Constituency		Women		Seats	+/–	Position	Government
2021	Bobi Wine	1,347,929	13.48%	1,697,425	16.71%	57 / 529	New	▲2nd	Opposition
2026	Bobi Wine	1,349,645	12.95%	1,550,819	15.41%	49 / 529	▼8	2nd	Opposition

== See also ==
- List of political parties in Uganda
- Elections in Uganda
