= Speaker of Parliament (Uganda) =

The Speaker of Parliament is the presiding officer of the Parliament of Uganda. The Speaker chairs sittings of Parliament, maintains order during debates, and ensures that parliamentary procedures are followed in accordance with the Constitution and the Rules of Procedure.

== Overview ==
The office of Speaker is established under the 1995 Constitution of the Republic of Uganda. The Speaker is elected by Members of Parliament from among persons qualified to be Members of Parliament, and must vacate any party position upon election to remain impartial while presiding over parliamentary business. The Speaker represents Parliament in its relations with the President, the Executive, and external bodies. The office is one of the highest constitutional offices in Uganda.

== Functions ==
The Speaker performs several key functions:

- Presiding over sittings of Parliament
- Interpreting and enforcing the Rules of Procedure
- Maintaining order and discipline in the House
- Referring bills to parliamentary committees
- Representing Parliament at official functions and international engagements

The Speaker does not ordinarily participate in debates and votes only when necessary in accordance with parliamentary rules.

== Election and tenure ==
The Speaker is elected at the first sitting of a new Parliament. A candidate must be qualified to be elected as a Member of Parliament. The Speaker serves for the duration of the parliamentary term, which is five years, unless he or she resigns, is removed from office by resolution of Parliament, or otherwise ceases to hold office in accordance with the Constitution.

== Deputy Speaker ==
The Deputy Speaker assists the Speaker in carrying out his or her duties and presides over sittings in the absence of the Speaker. The Deputy Speaker is also elected by Members of Parliament.

== History ==
Since the promulgation of the 1995 Constitution, the office of Speaker has played a central role in Uganda’s legislative process. Notable holders of the office include John Bowes Griffin, Narendra M. Patel, Edward Rugumayo, Francis K. Butagira, James Wapakhabulo, Francis Ayume, Edward Ssekandi, Rebecca Kadaga, Jacob Oulanyah, and Anita Among.

== See also ==
- List of speakers of the Parliament of Uganda
- Parliament of Uganda
- Politics of Uganda
