= Jacob Oboth-Oboth =

Speaker of the 12th parliament of Uganda

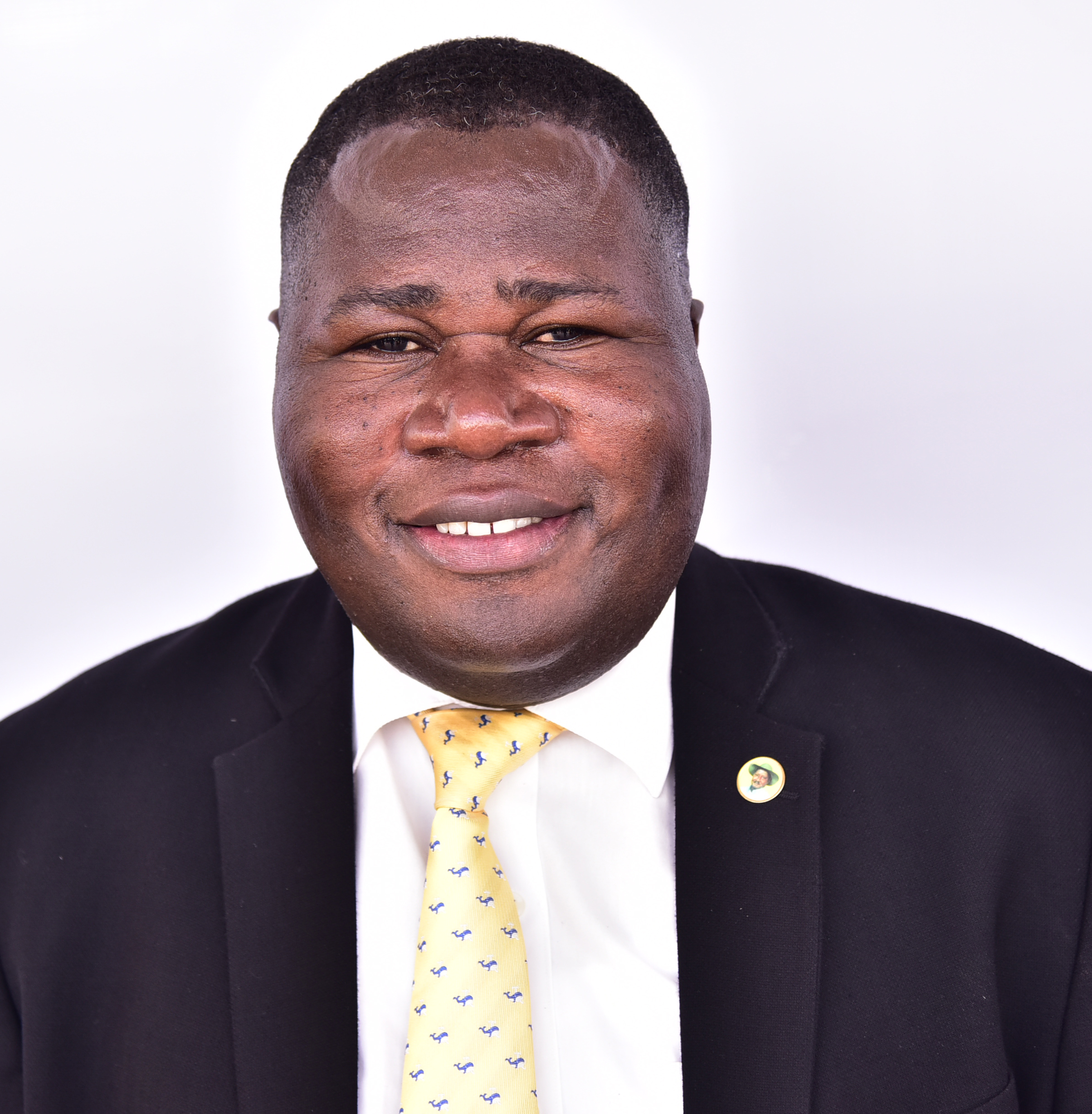
- Oboth-Oboth in 2021

Speaker of the Parliament of Uganda
- Incumbent
- Assumed office 25 May 2026
- President: Yoweri Kaguta Museveni
- Preceded by: Anita Annet Among

Personal details
- Born: Jacob Oboth; 13 April 1971 (age 55) Tororo, Uganda
- Citizenship: Uganda
- Party: National Resistance Movement
- Education: Makerere University (LLB); Law Development Centre; University of Minnesota (LLM)
- Occupation: Lawyer, politician
- Known for: Law, politics

Jacob Marksons Oboth (born 13 April 1971), commonly known as Jacob Oboth-Oboth, is a Ugandan lawyer and politician serving as the Speaker of the 12th Parliament of Uganda. He is the Member of Parliament for West Budama County South and a member of the National Resistance Movement since 2011. He also served as the State Minister for Defence from 2024 to 2026.

In Parliament, Oboth-Oboth has chaired several committees, including the Committee on Legal and Parliamentary Affairs, the Committee on Rules, Discipline and Privileges, and the Committee on Natural Resources.

== Early life and education ==
Oboth-Oboth was born in Tororo District Eastern Uganda, on 13 April 1971 in an Anglican family. He attended Muwafu Primary School for his primary school education and St. Denis Ssebugwawo Secondary School for his O-level academic qualifications.

At one time, Oboth-Oboth was picked up by American missionaries from Tororo streets after being sent away from school for lack of tuition. It was a difficult time for him but during his time with the missionaries, he worked as a store keeper on top of doing other petty jobs for two years before joining Tororo High School for his A-Level education. Oboth-Oboth was admitted to Makerere University in 1997 to study Law. Subsequently, he enrolled for a management certificate course at Uganda Management Institute.

In 2001, Oboth-Oboth graduated with a Bachelor of Laws degree and then in 2002, he acquired a postgraduate diploma in legal practice from Law Development Centre. In 2004, he acquired two certifications from the International Development Law Organization; one in Intellectual Property and another in Public Procurement. He also has a Master of Law degree (2007) in election and cyber law from the University of Minnesota.

== Career ==
After graduating as a lawyer, Oboth-Oboth served as the Deputy Attorney General for Tieng Adhola Cultural Institution. He also secured employment in the Ministry of Justice and Constitutional Affairs as a state attorney. He worked in Mbale for some time as the State Attorney Mbale Regional Office before going to the United States to pursue a master's degree in election and cyber law at the University of Minnesota.

Upon his return in 2007, Oboth-Oboth resumed his work in government until 2010 when he resigned to join active politics. His stay in the US had enabled him to acquire donors who offered to initiate projects in his constituency, and that in a way helped sway voters to his side. He found it easy to reach out to the poor in his constituency because he was seen as one of them.

Jacob Oboth-Oboth was first elected as West Budama South MP (Independent) in 2011 after defeating the then State Minister for Labor, Dr Emmanuel Otaala, who subsequently but unsuccessfully challenged his victory in the Courts of law. He retained his seat in 2016 after polling 20,653 votes against the NRM candidate, Phibby Awere Otaala's 19, 462 votes. Oboth-Oboth set the record for being the first legislator to be elected for a second successive term in this constituency which had not re-elected an incumbent MP to Parliament since 1996.

In the 9th Parliament, Oboth-Oboth was the chairperson of the Committee on Rules, Discipline and Privileges and the parliamentary ad hoc committee to investigate the electricity sub-sector; the Committee on Natural Resources. In the 10th Parliament, he is the chairperson of the Legal and Parliamentary Affairs Committee and a member of the Committee on Rules, Discipline and Privileges and the Business Committee.

On Friday, 15 May 2026, CDF Muhoozi Kainerugaba and members of his Patriotic League of Uganda (PLU) endorsed Oboth-Oboth for Speaker of the 12th Parliament of Uganda, withdrawing their support from incumbent Anita Among. Further still, on Saturday, 23 May 2026, the NRM Central Executive Committee (CEC) also approved Jacob Oboth-Oboth as the candidate for the Speaker of the 12th parliament of Uganda.

== See also ==
- Tororo District
- Annet Anita Among
- Jacab Oulanyah

Preceded by Anita Among	Speaker of Parliament; 2026 – 2031	Succeeded by Incumbent
Preceded by Thomas Tayebwa	Deputy Speaker of Parliament; 2021 – 2031	Succeeded by Incumbent
