= James Wapakhabulo =

Ugandan lawyer and politician

- Born: March 23, 1945; Mbale, Uganda
- Died: March 27, 2004 (aged 59); Bugoloobi, Uganda
- Citizenship: Uganda
- Education: University of Dar es Salaam (Bachelor of Laws); Law Development Center (Diploma in Legal Practice)
- Occupations: Lawyer & politician
- Years active: 1960s — 2004
- Known for: Politics
- Title: Minister of Foreign Affairs, 2001 - 2004; Second Deputy Prime Minister, 2001 - 2004; Speaker of Parliament, 1996 - 1998

James Francis Wambogo Wapakhabulo (23 March 1945 – 27 March 2004) was a Ugandan lawyer and politician who served as the Minister of Foreign Affairs of Uganda from 2001 to 2004. He also served as a minister for cooperatives and marketing, minister for tourism, wildlife and antiquities, among other ministerial portfolios.

He was the Speaker of the 6^{th} Parliament of Uganda, a position he served in for about two years between 1996 and 1998. He was the chair of the Constituent Assembly (CA), which comprised representatives elected by the people of Uganda and promulgated the 1995 constitution, which replaced the one of 1967. As the third Deputy Prime Minister of Uganda, he addressed the 57th Session of the General Assembly of the United Nations.

== Early life and education background ==
James Wapakhabulo was born on 23 March 1945 in Mbale district, Eastern Uganda. He attended Nabumali High School for his high school education. Wapakhabulo studied law at the University of East Africa (now the University of Dar es Salaam). He went on to obtain a Diploma in Legal Practice from the Law Development Center in Kampala.

From the 1960s until its collapse in 1977, he worked as a clerk and legal draftsman with the Assembly of the East African Community. Later that year, he moved to Papua New Guinea, as first a senior legal draftsman and then a principal legal officer. He continued in this role until 1986.

== Political career ==
Wapakhabulo became involved with the ruling National Resistance Movement. He then stood for Parliament, and between 1994 and 1995 was chairman of the Constituent Assembly. In 1996, he was promoted to Speaker of Parliament, a post he held until 1998. In 1998, he was appointed the National Political Commissar in Uganda's no-party political system until 2001 when he became Second Deputy Prime Minister and Minister of Foreign Affairs. He held both these positions until his death.

During his time as foreign minister, he helped contain a conflict with Rwanda and soothed relations with the Democratic Republic of the Congo, Burundi, and Sudan. In 2001, Wapakhabulo threatened to sue an opposition MP, Wanjusi Wasieba, after Wasieba accused him of blocking his electoral nomination. After making the accusation, Wasieba claimed that he had received death threats and hired armed guards.

Several days before he died, Wapakhabulo wrote to President (and long-time friend) Yoweri Museveni, opposing the lifting of term limits outside those prescribed by the constitution. He died at his home in the neighborhood of Bugolobi in Kampala on 27 March 2004. He was laid to rest at Mafudu Village, Sironko District on Friday, 2 April 2004.

Wapakhabulo was liked by many on both sides of Ugandan politics. Upon hearing of his death, leading opposition MP Aggrey Awori stated that he was "the best speaker ever". He was a recipient of Uganda's Nalubaale Medal for civilian activists who had assisted during the guerrilla war. Upon his death, Vice President Gilbert Bukenya proposed that Parliament Avenue in Kampala be renamed Wapa Avenue in honor of Wapakhabulo.

In January 2005, President Museveni appointed Sam Kutesa, the then Minister of State for Investment, to succeed Wapakhabulo as foreign minister.

== See also ==
- List of speakers of the Parliament of Uganda
- Francis Butagira
- Edward Ssekandi
- Rebecca Kadaga

Parliament of Uganda
| Preceded by Yoweri Museveni | Speaker of Parliament; 1996 - 1998 | Succeeded by Francis Ayume |
