= Nkwasibwe Zinkuratire Henry =

Ugandan politician and businessman

Henry Nkwasibwe Zinkuratire

Member of Parliament of Uganda
- In office 2021–2026
- Preceded by: William Beijukye Zinkuratire
- Succeeded by: Beatrice Rwakimari
- Constituency: Ruhaama County

Personal details
- Born: August 28, 1973 (age 53) Uganda
- Party: National Resistance Movement
- Occupation: Ugandan Politician, businessman

Nkwasibwe Zinkuratire Henry (born 28 August 1973) is a Ugandan politician and businessman who served as the Member of Parliament for Ruhaama County in Ntungamo District in the 11th Parliament of Uganda.

== Early life and education background ==
Henry Nkwasibwe Zinkuratire was born on 28 August 1973 to Mr. Zinkuratire John and Mrs. Beatrice Zinkuratire. He completed his Uganda Certificate of Education (O'Level) in 2018 from Entebbe Secondary School.

== Career ==
Henry Nkwasibwe Zinkuratire entered national electoral politics as a candidate for the Ruhaama County parliamentary seat in Ntungamo District and contested the seat on the ticket of the National Resistance Movement in the 2021 general election and won.

During the 11th Parliament, Zinkuratire served as a member of the Government Assurance and Implementation Committee for the 2021–2023 period. He also served as a member of the Legal and Parliamentary Affairs Committee from 2023 to 2024. And also served as a member on Equal Opportunities Committee from January 2024 to May 2026.

In the 2025 NRM primary elections, Zinkuratire lost the party's parliamentary flag for Ruhaama County to Beatrice Rwakimari. He subsequently contested the constituency in the 2026 general election as an independent candidate and lost to Beatrice Rwakimari ending his term as Member of Parliament for Ruhaama County.

== Personal life ==
Henry Nkwasibwe Zinkuratire was born on 28 August 1973 and is the son of Zinkuratire John and Beatrice Zinkuratire. He is married and is a professional businessman.

Zinkuratire is the younger brother of William Beijukye Zinkuratire, who was a Member of Parliament representing Ruhaama County before his death in 2018.

== See also ==
- List of members of the eleventh parliament
- Beatrice Rwakimari
- Mugisha Muntu
- Janet Kataha Museveni
