= Paul Mwiru =

Ugandan lawyer and politician (born 1977)

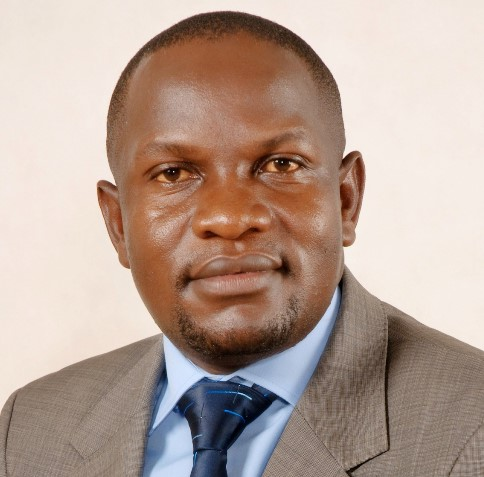
- Born: August 12, 1977 (age 49)
- Citizenship: Uganda
- Education: Bachelor's degree in law, Makerere University Diploma in law, Law Advancement Centre Olevel and Alevel, Jinja senior secondary school

Paul Mwiru is a Ugandan lawyer and a politician.

He served as Member of Parliament elect for the Jinja municipality east constituency in Jinja City, in the eastern region of Uganda.

== Background and education ==
Born on 12 August 1977 in Walukuba East in Jinja District, Mwiru went to Walukuba East Primary School where he did his primary living examination, before joining Jinja senior secondary school where he acquired both the Uganda Certificate of Education (UCE) and the Uganda advanced Certificate of Education (UACE). He thereafter sought after a diploma in law at the Law Development Centre. After some break from school, he returned to his quest for a Bachelor's degree in law at Makerere University, which he got in 2010.

== Political career ==
Mwiru, who was a member of the Forum for Democratic change contested for Jinja East parliamentary seat for 5 times against National Resistance Movement's Nathan Igeme Nabeta. In 2018, Mwiru won the Jinja East seat against Nabeta in a hotly contested by election.He took oath on 27th March 2018 to represent the constituency.

His election was contested by NRM in courts of law.

Mwiru successfully managed to retain his seat in the general elections in 2021, where he beat his close opponent of the National Resistance Movement's Nathan Igeme Nabeta.

From FDC, he was affiliated to the Alliance for National Transformation (ANT) but later joined National Unit Platform [NUP] party. In 2026 elections he contested for the same seat on NUP ticket and emerged winner.

== Bid for speakership ==
On 19th May 2026, Mwiru was fronted by National Unity Platform as their preferred candidate for the speakership of the 12th Parliament. He was regarded as the joint opposition candidate for the race. However, despite having the entire opposition support, Mwiru was defeated by National Resistance's Jacob Oboth Oboth on numbers.

Mwiru was later appointed opposition chief whip in the 2026/2031 shadow cabinet.
