= Mwesigwa Rukutana =

Ugandan lawyer and politician

- Born: 15 November 1959 (age 66); Uganda
- Citizenship: Uganda
- Education: Makerere University (Bachelor of Laws); Law Development Centre (Diploma in Legal Practice)
- Occupations: Lawyer & Politician
- Years active: 1986–present
- Known for: Politics
- Title: State Minister for Labor

Mwesigwa Rukutana, is a Ugandan lawyer and politician. He served as Deputy Attorney General of Uganda from 1 March 2015 to January 2020. He replaced Fred Ruhindi, who was appointed Attorney General. He was transferred from attorney general chambers to Minister of State for Labour until June 2021 when he was dropped from the cabinet. He was appointed to the post of deputy attorney general on 1 March 2015, Between 27 May 2011 and 1 March 2015, he served as the State Minister for Labor in the Ugandan Cabinet. He replaced Emmanuel Otala, who was dropped from the Cabinet. Prior to that, he served as the State Minister for Higher Education, from 16 February 2009 until 27 May 2011.

He is Former Member of Parliament (MP) for Rushenyi County, Ntungamo District. He had continuously served in that capacity since 2001 until he lost to Naome Kabasharira in the 2021 general election.

On 6 September 2020, while NRM Primaries were going on, Rukutana was accused by his opponents of shooting two people. The police in Ntungamo District arrested and detained Rukutana and his three bodyguards following a suspected shooting incident. This accusation was found to be false and the courts of Law acquitted him

== Background and education ==
He was born in Ntungamo District on 15 November 1959. He attended Kigezi High School for his O-Level education. He transferred to Mbarara High School where he completed his A-Level studies. He holds the degree of Bachelor of Laws from Makerere University, Uganda's oldest university, established in 1922. He also holds the Diploma in Law Practice from the Law Development Center in Kampala, Uganda's capital.

== Career ==
He served as the Registrar of Titles, in the Ministry of Lands, from 1986 until 1988. From 1984 until 1992, he served as a Lecturer in Law at the Law Development Center, in Kampala. In 1994, he was elected as a Delegate to the Constituent Assembly that drafted the 1995 Ugandan Constitution, serving in that capacity until 1995. In 2001, he was elected to the Ugandan Parliament, to represent Rushenyi County, Ntungamo District. He was re-elected in 2006. In 2001, he was appointed Minister of State for Finance, serving in that capacity until 2006. In 2006, he was appointed Minister of State for Labor, serving in that capacity until 2009. He was reassigned as State Minister for Education, Responsible for Higher Education, on 16 February 2009

== Personal details ==
He belongs to the National Resistance Movement political party. His interests include farming, investing in real estate and in hotels & resorts. Mwesigwa Rukutana believes in polygamy and is married to 4 wives with 15 children, according to his interview with Daily Monitor, Uganda's leading news paper, in 2010.

== See also ==
- Parliament of Uganda
- Cabinet of Uganda
- Ntungamo District
- Naome Kabasharira
