= Alexander Waibale =

Ugandan lawyer and politician

Chairman of the National Consultative Council (NCC)
- In office 22 May 1980 – 16 September 1980
- Preceded by: Edward Rugumayo

Member of Parliament for Jinja West
- In office December 1980 – July 1985

Personal details
- Born: 1952
- Died: 23 June 2018 (aged 64–65) Jinja, Uganda
- Citizenship: Ugandan
- Party: Democratic Party (1980–1985)
- Other political affiliations: Independent (during NCC)
- Children: 7
- Occupation: Lawyer, politician
- Profession: Lawyer

Alexander Waibale (1952–2018) also known as Alex Waibale was a Ugandan lawyer and politician who served as Chairman of the National Consultative Council (NCC), Uganda's interim parliament, from 22 May to 16 September 1980. He also represented Jinja District as a Member of Parliament from 1980 to 1985.

== Career ==
Waibale was a lawyer based in Jinja who also served as deputy mayor of Jinja after being appointed by the Minister of Local Government of the Uganda National Liberation Front (UNLF) government that succeeded Idi Amin. He was elected as a member of the National Consultative Council representing Jinja District, securing 39 out of 42 votes from district councillors.

In the December 1980 general elections, Waibale contested and won the Jinja West constituency on the Democratic Party ticket. He served as a Member of Parliament in the National Assembly from December 1980 until the military coup of July 1985.

=== Chairmanship of the National Consultative Council ===
The National Consultative Council was established at the Moshi Unity Conference in Tanzania (23–25 March 1979) as the interim legislature of the UNLF following the overthrow of Idi Amin. It functioned from April 1979 until the general elections of December 1980.

In May 1980, following the death of Yugoslav President Josip Broz Tito, NCC Chairman Professor Edward Rugumayo and three other members travelled abroad for the funeral. While they were away, a Military Commission headed by Paulo Muwanga overthrew President Godfrey Binaisa on 12 May 1980. Rugumayo subsequently indicated from Nairobi that he would not return to Uganda.

On 22 May 1980 the NCC convened and elected a new chairman. Waibale defeated Dent Ocaya Lakidi, who was Kampala deputy mayor and Kampala District delegate by 53 votes to 27 in what was described as the first contested speakership election in Uganda's parliamentary history. The Clerk to the House, Edward Ochwo, presided over the election.

==== Resignation ====
Waibale resigned on 16 September 1980 after approximately four months in office. In a 2018 interview with the Daily Monitor, he stated that he resigned “on principle because I did not want to be pushed. As a Speaker, I was supposed to be independent.”

After announcing his resignation to the House, Waibale drove the official Mercedes-Benz to Jinja Road Police Station, surrendered the vehicle keys, and informed the station commander that he was no longer Speaker. He returned to Jinja the following day by public transport.

== Later work ==
Waibale continued to practise law in Jinja as Managing Partner of Waibale Advocates. He later served as Chairman of the Jinja District Land Board. In 2017 he appeared before the Commission of Inquiry into Land Matters chaired by Justice Catherine Bamugemereire in connection with allegations concerning the management of land titles under the board's custody to which he denied involvement in fraud.

== Death ==
He died on a Saturday afternoon in June 2018 at his home in Jinja. He was survived by a widow and seven children.

== See also ==
- Edward Rugumayo
- Francis Ayume
- Parliament of Uganda
