= Anita Among =

Ugandan lawyer, accountant and politician

Honorable Anita Among
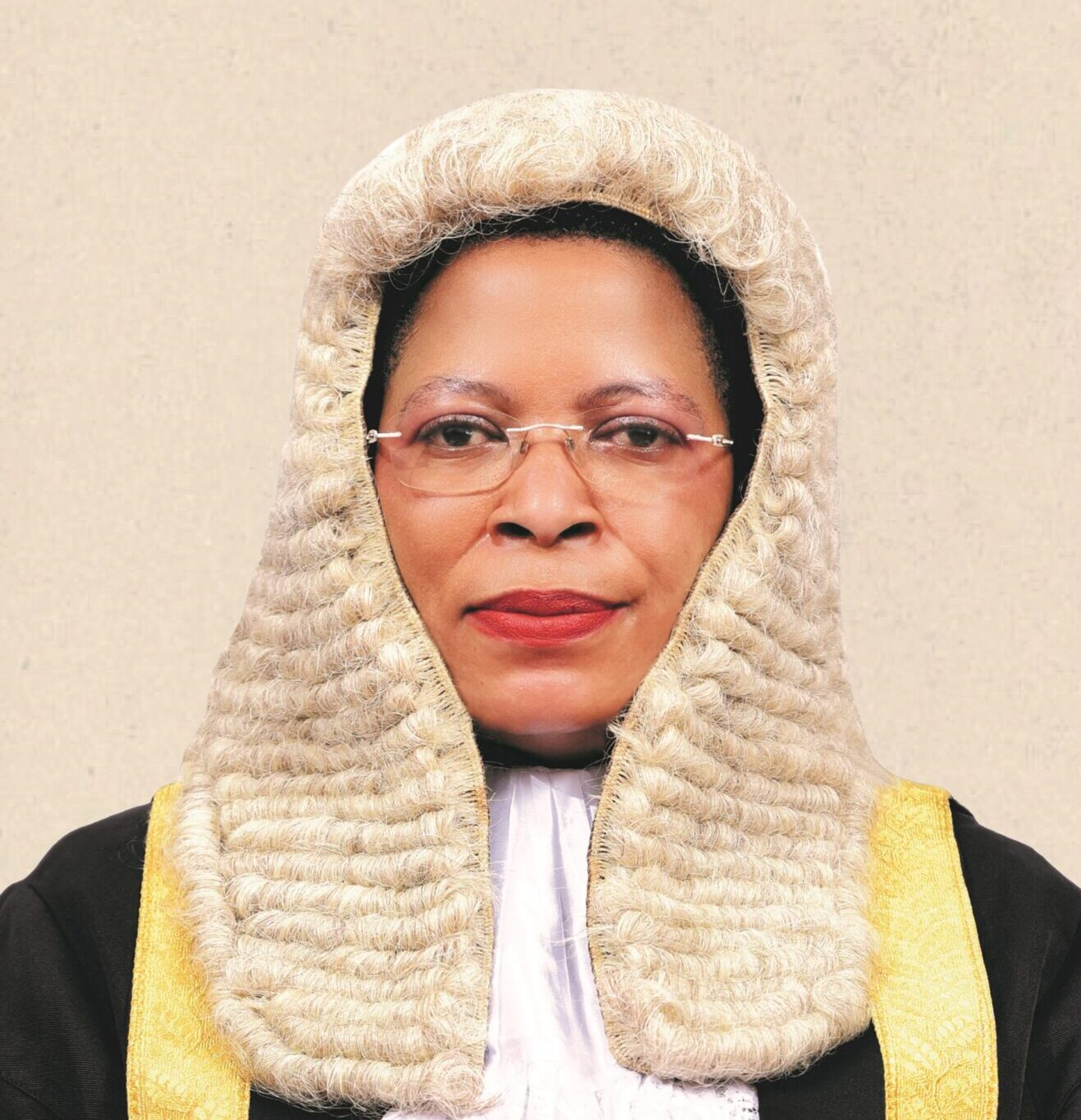
- Official portrait, 2021

Speaker of the Parliament of Uganda
- In office 25 March 2022 – 11 May 2026
- President: Yoweri Kaguta Museveni
- Preceded by: Jacob Oulanyah
- Succeeded by: Jacob Marksons Oboth

National Vice Chairperson on the CEC of the NRM

Personal details
- Born: Anita Annet Among; 23 November 1973 (age 52) Bukedea County, Kumi District, Uganda (now Bukedea District)
- Citizenship: Uganda
- Party: National Resistance Movement
- Spouse: Moses Magogo Hassim (m. 2022)
- Children: 3
- Education: Makerere University (Bachelor of Business Administration, Master of Business Administration); Kampala International University (Bachelor of Laws)
- Occupation: Accountant, politician, lawyer

Anita Annet Among (born 23 November 1973) is a Ugandan accountant, lawyer and politician who served as the speaker of the 11th Parliament of Uganda from 2022 to May 2026. She has represented Bukedea District as the Woman Member of Parliament since 2016, serving in the 10th, 11th and 12th Parliaments.

Among was first elected to Parliament in 2016 as an independent candidate, after previously contesting the seat unsuccessfully. She later joined the National Resistance Movement (NRM) and served as Deputy Speaker of the 11th Parliament before being elected Speaker in March 2022 following the death of Jacob Oulanyah

Ahead of the 2026 general election, Among was declared elected unopposed for Bukedea District Woman Representative after no rival candidate appeared on the final ballot. The circumstances of her unopposed nomination were challenged by opposition aspirant Norma Susan Otai, who sued Among and the Electoral Commission, alleging obstruction of her candidature.

She was a member of the FDC party before joining the ruling NRM party, where she was voted as the deputy speaker of the 10th Parliament. She is also the second female deputy speaker in the history of Uganda's parliament after Rebecca Alitwala Kadaga.

Anita is named in the torture complaint against the Ugandan government that was submitted to the International Criminal Court.

She is the proprietor of Bukedea Comprehensive Academy, a co-educational boarding school founded in 2018. The academy, located in Bukedea District, offers vocational training alongside its academic programs.

She is also the proprietor of Bukedea Teaching Hospital and Bukedea Comprehensive Sports Park which were commissioned by President Museveni in 2024.

== Early life and education ==
Among was born in Bukedea County, Kumi District (now Bukedea District) on 23 November 1973 in a family of 48 children, where the majority of her siblings were girls. She attended local schools for her elementary education.

She graduated with a Bachelor of Business Administration degree from Makerere University in 2005. In 2008, she was awarded a Master of Business Administration degree, also by Makerere University.

In 2018, Among graduated from Kampala International University, with a Bachelor of Laws degree. At that time she was in the process of attaining qualification as a chartered certified accountant.

== Career ==
From 1998 to 2006, Among worked at Centenary Bank, one of the large commercial banks in the country as a cleaner during her S.6 vacation, later becoming a cashier. At the time she left in 2006, she had risen to the rank of a branch manager. For the ten years prior to her election to Parliament, she served as a lecturer in accounting, at Makerere University Business School and Kampala International University.

=== Politics ===
For two parliamentary election cycles in 2007, when Bukedea District was created, and in 2011, Among lost the District Woman Representative seat to Rose Akol of the National Resistance Movement (NRM) political party.

Among, a long-time member of the opposition Forum for Democratic Change (FDC) political party, ran in 2016 as an independent candidate. She won and is the incumbent MP.

In 2020, she joined the National Resistance Movement (NRM) after falling out with her party FDC and won the party primaries. In the 2021 general elections, Among was one of the few legislators who was elected unopposed to join the 11th Parliament though her victory was contentious because the electoral commission blocked some of her competitors from nomination.

In the 10th Parliament, Among served as the vice chairperson of the Committee on Commissions, Statutory Authorities and State Enterprises (COSASE).

Among declared her bid for the deputy speakership of the 11th parliament of Uganda.

Among was elected as the new speaker of the parliament of Uganda on March 25, 2022 replacing Jacob Oulanyah, who died in Seattle, Washington. In 2023, she urged members of the Ugandan National Assembly to support a new bill that would make the mere fact of identifying oneself as lesbian, gay, bisexual, transgender and queer or questioning illegal and risk up to ten years of incarceration.

In October 2025, she was declared unopposed Woman MP for Bukedea and took the oath on 13 May 2026.

On 16 May 2026, a joint security team raided her Kampala residence as part of an investigation into alleged corruption. She later announced on 17 May 2026 that she was not offering herself for the speakership race of the 12th Parliament.

Among has been assigned as the regular member on the committee on Government Assurances and implementation, which was to be headed by Mityana Municipality MP Hon. Francis Zaake as the chairperson on 7 July 2026.

== International sanctions ==
On 30 April 2024, the UK's Foreign Office announced personal sanctions against Among and two other high-level Ugandan officials under its Global Anti-Corruption sanctions regime for their involvement in significant corruption, making her a subject to an asset freeze and a travel ban. On 30 May 2024, Among and several other Ugandan officials were sanctioned by the US State Department on charges of corruption.

== 2026 corruption probe and speakership withdrawal ==
In May 2026, Among became the subject of a multi-agency investigation over allegations of corruption, money laundering and illicit enrichment. The investigation involved security personnel from the Criminal Investigations Directorate, the Uganda People's Defence Forces and other state agencies, and was reported by several Ugandan media outlets as part of a wider inquiry into alleged unexplained wealth and abuse of office.

The searches began in Kampala and were later reported to have extended to properties linked to Among in Nakasero, Ntinda, Kigo and Bukedea. Media reports stated that investigators searched her residences and other premises connected to her, including homes in Bukedea, as part of the same inquiry.

During the operation, security agencies reportedly seized several luxury vehicles linked to Among, including a Rolls-Royce Cullinan. Daily Monitor reported that the seizure occurred at her Kigo residence on 18 May 2026, while New Vision also reported that police had impounded the Rolls-Royce and other high-end vehicles.

The Inspectorate of Government also confirmed that it had received a petition accusing Among of failing to declare, or under-declaring, her wealth under the Leadership Code Act. New Vision reported that the petition had been filed by lawyers and was being handled through the Inspectorate's administrative and legal procedures. Subsequent reports stated that the inquiry had expanded to include officials from other public institutions, including the Electoral Commission and the judiciary.

Media outlets also reported additional measures against Among, including restrictions on her movement, changes to her security arrangements and the freezing of bank accounts linked to her. New Vision reported that the freezing of accounts followed a high-level meeting involving security chiefs, the Inspectorate of Government, the Criminal Investigations Directorate, the Financial Intelligence Authority and President Yoweri Museveni.

On 18 May 2026, Among announced that she would not seek election as Speaker of the 12th Parliament. In a statement posted on her official X account, she said the decision followed consultations and was intended to maintain harmony within the National Resistance Movement. She also stated that she would cooperate with ongoing investigations. The announcement came after several days of security searches and asset seizures at properties linked to her.

The reports did not state that Among had been convicted of any offence in relation to the allegations. As of the cited reports, the matter remained under investigation. After over 100 days in house detention, Among was released after being pardoned by the president of the republic of Uganda. News of her freedom first came to be known publicly through an X post by Gen. Muhoozi Kainerugaba Commander of Defence Forces in Uganda.

== Personal life ==
Among and her husband Moses Magogo Hassim have twins, earning her the title of Nnaalongo in Uganda. She introduced him to her parents in a traditional marriage ceremony. She is also rumored to have a son with one of Forum for Democratic Change's officials in western Uganda, Patrick Baguma Atenyi.

== See also ==
- List of members of the tenth Parliament of Uganda
- Jacob Marksons Oboth Oboth
- Thomas Tayebwa

Preceded by Jacob Oulanyah	Speaker of Parliament; 2022 – 2026	Succeeded by Anita Among
Preceded by Thomas Tayebwa	Deputy Speaker of Parliament; 2021 – 2031	Succeeded by Incumbent
