= Narendra M. Patel =

Former speaker of Ugandan legislature

Narendra Patel

Speaker of the Parliament of Uganda
- In office 1963 – January 1971
- President: Mutesa II; Milton Obote
- Preceded by: John Bowes Griffin
- Succeeded by: Legislature disbanded

Personal details
- Born: Narendra M. Patel; 1926/1928 Pij, Kheda district, Gujarat, India
- Died: December 2012 Baroda, India
- Party: Uganda People's Congress

Narendra M. Patel was a Ugandan politician of Indian origin and former Speaker of the Parliament of Uganda.

Patel was 85 years old in 2012, so he was born sometime between 1926 and 1928. He was born in Pij, Kheda district, Gujarat province, in India. He has a law degree from University of Bombay. He worked in private practice in Uganda.

Patel was elected to the Parliament of Uganda in 1962 from Mbale constituency, under the banner of Uganda People's Congress. He was the speaker of the Parliament of the First Republic in 1963. Patel was described to not have wielded much power with respect to Obote's government. He was the speaker until president Milton Obote abrogated the constitution in 1971.

Patel then returned to private practice. He left Uganda in 1973, when Idi Amin ordered all Ugandans of Asian origin to leave the country. Patel first left for India, and then settled to Australia. He died in Baroda, India, in December 2012.

Preceded by John Bowes Griffin	Speaker of Parliament; 1963–1971	Succeeded by No legislature
