= Naome Kabasharira =

Ugandan politician

Hon. Kabasharira Naome
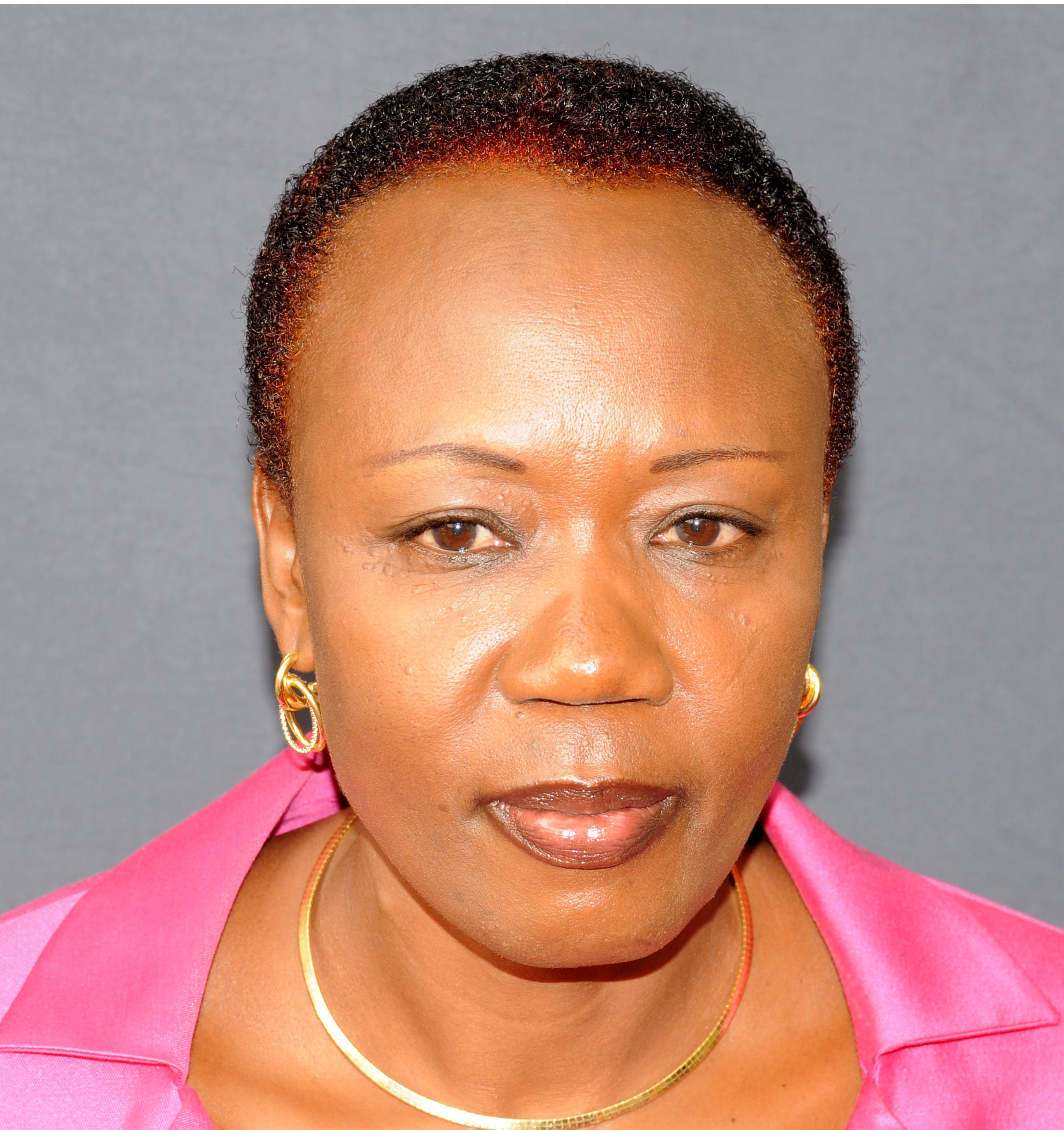
- Born: 12 October 1967 (age 58); Ntungamo District
- Citizenship: Ugandan
- Education: Bachelor of Arts
- Occupation: Politician
- Predecessor: Mwesigwa Rukutana
- Political party: Independent
- Spouse: Late John Bashaija Kazoora

Naome Kabasharira (born 12 October 1967) is a Ugandan politician. She is the member of parliament representing Rushenyi county in Ntungamo District. She was the woman member of parliament representing Ntungamo District from 1996 to 2001.

== Early life and education ==
Kabasharira was born on 12 October 1967 in Rushenyi county, Ntungamo District to the late Perezi Kabasharira.

Kabasharira went to Bweranyangi Girls' Senior Secondary School for her ordinary level studies and joined Trinity College Nabbingo for her advanced level studies. She graduated from Makerere University with a bachelor of arts in social sciences.

She was married to the late John Bashaija Kazoora.

== Career ==
Kabasharira became the woman member of the sixth parliament (1996-2001) representing Ntungamo district. In September 2011, she contested in the National Resistance Movement primary elections, and defeated incumbent Beatrice Rwakimari.

In 2021, Kabasharira was elected the member of parliament representing Rushenyi county as an independent candidate, defeating Mwesigwa Rukutana. She was appointed deputy chairperson of the committee on presidential affairs.

== Controversy ==
Kabasharira was disqualified from standing for member of parliament in 2001, because she presented forged academic papers. Her degree was cancelled by Makerere University after investigations over forgery of papers used for admission.
