= Beatrice Rwakimari =

Ugandan politician

Honorable

Personal details
- Born: Beatrice Rwakimari; 21 May 1961 (age 65) Ntungamo, Uganda
- Citizenship: Uganda
- Party: NRM
- Education: Makerere University (BA (Hons) Education) (Master of Public Administration); Uganda Christian University (Master of Public Health Leadership)
- Occupation: Public health leader, politician, public administrator, teacher
- Known for: Public administration, politics

Beatrice Rwakimari (born 21 May 1961) is a Ugandan public health leader, public administrator, teacher and politician. She was the elected Woman MP for Ntungamo District in Uganda's tenth parliament and was politically affiliated to NRM, the ruling political party in Uganda since 1986. She previously served the constituency for two consecutive terms in the 7th and 8th parliaments from 2001 to 2011. In the 10th Parliament, she served as a member of the Appointments Committee, the Committee on Health and the NRM Parliamentary Caucus.

She was replaced by Joseline Baata Kamateneti in the 2021 general elections

== Political career ==
She won the Ruhaama County parliamentary seat after gathering 30,823 votes and defeated the incumbent Henry Nkwasibwe who garnered 19,891 votes in the 2026 elections.

== See also ==
- Ntungamo District
- Parliament of Uganda
- National Resistance Movement
- Naome Kabasharira
