= Thomas Tayebwa =

Ugandan lawyer and politician (born 1980)

Honorable Thomas Tayebwa
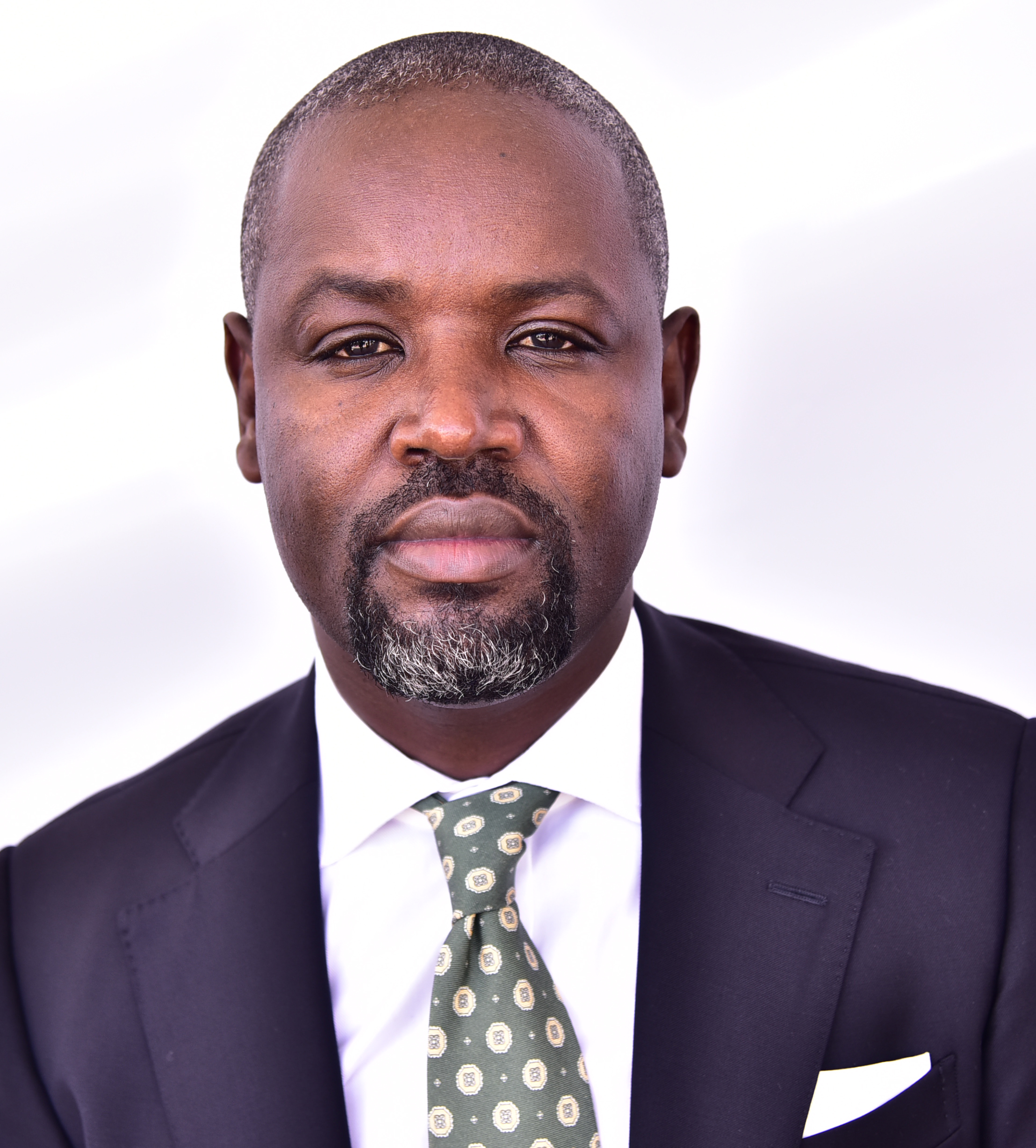
- Tayebwa in May 2021

Deputy Speaker of Parliament

Personal details
- Born: Thomas Tayebwa; 10 November 1980 (age 45) Mitooma, Uganda
- Citizenship: Uganda
- Other political affiliations: Patriotic League of Uganda
- Spouse: Anita Rukundo (m. 2009)
- Children: Turyakira Nicholas
- Education: Makerere University (B.A., LL.B.)
- Occupation: Lawyer, politician
- Known for: Politics

Thomas Tayebwa is a Ugandan lawyer and politician serving as the Deputy Speaker of the Parliament of Uganda since 2022. He represents Ruhinda North County in Mitooma District in Parliament under the National Resistance Movement (NRM) party. In 2025, he was elected President of the Organisation of Africa, Caribbean and Pacific States Parliamentary Assembly.

== Early life and education ==
Tayebwa was born on 10 November 1980 to Bangirana Daudi and Abbie Komuhangi of Bitereko Village in Mitooma District. He attended Kigarama Primary School, Kigarama Senior Secondary School, Nganwa High School and Ruyonza School before joining Makerere University, where he earned a Bachelor of Arts in Social Sciences in 2005 and a Bachelor of Laws degree in 2012.

== Roles ==
Tayebwa serves as the director of Cholmat Investments.

=== Politics ===
In October 2015, Tayebwa joined elective politics on the NRM ticket, winning both the party's primaries with 15092 votes and 2016 Ugandan general election thereby becoming a member of the 10th Parliament of Uganda. In Parliament, he served on the Committee on National Economy and Natural Resources Committee.

On March 25, 2022, Tayebwa was elected Deputy Speaker of the Parliament following the Death of Speaker Jacob Oulanyah and elevetion of Anita Annet Among to Speaker.

In May 2026, Tayebwa retained the position of Deputy Speaker in Uganda's 12th Parliament after winning a parliamentary vote at Kololo Ceremonial Grounds.

In February 2025, Tayebwa was elected President of the Organisation of Africa, Caribbean and Pacific States (OACPS) Parliamentary Assembly, becoming co-chair of the OACPS-EU Joint Parliamentary Assembly.

Tayebwa has also represented Uganda at Inter-Parliamentary Union assemblies and East African regional parliamentary events, where he has advocated for fair trade, regional integration, and African sovereignty.

== Personal life ==
On 14 February 2009, Tayebwa married Anita Rukundo at St. Augustine Chapel in Makerere, Kampala. They have one child.

== Torture allegations ==
On 21 August 2020, Tayebwa's home in Busaabala was visited by a Umeme employee, identified as Bukenya Bonny, to disconnect the power supply. According to Umeme management, Tayebwa had failed to pay multiple electricity bills and had illegally reconnected the building to the grid. Tayebwa was reported to police by Umeme for allegedly torturing Bonny on video. Tayebwa is heard saying: "How many canes are remaining? Add him two as my bonus" On 29 August 2020 Tayebwa publicly apologized to Bukenya after a video circulated showing him involved in the altercation.
