= Phoebe Awere Otaala =

Ugandan politician

- Other name: Phibby Awere Otaala
- Citizenship: Uganda
- Occupations: Former Ugandan Diplomat, Politician, CEO Hands of Hope NGO
- Years active: 2017-2020 being diplomat UpToDate CEO
- Organization: Hands of Hope
- Political party: NRM
- Spouse: Emmanuel Otaala
- Awards: Woman of the year 2003 award

Phoebe Awere Otaala also known as "Phibby Otaala" is a Ugandan politician. She married Emmanuel Otaala, the former Minister of State for health and member of parliament for West Budama South. She served as High commissioner for Kenya from 2017-2020 after replacing Ambassador Angellina Wapakhabulo. She resigned as ambassador and returned to Uganda to participate in the Tororo NRM primaries for district Woman MP, in which she lost.

== Career ==
Awere Otaala was the ambassador of Uganda in Kenya from 2017 to 2020. She is a founder of an NGO called Hands of Hope.

== Recognition ==
She was awarded as woman of the year award by the American Biographical institute for her initiatives in helping needy children and her name was added in the American Who is Who yearbook.

== See also ==
- American Biographical institute
- Ruth Achieng
- Mull Katende
