= Emmanuel Otiam Otala =

Ugandan politician

Emmanuel Otala
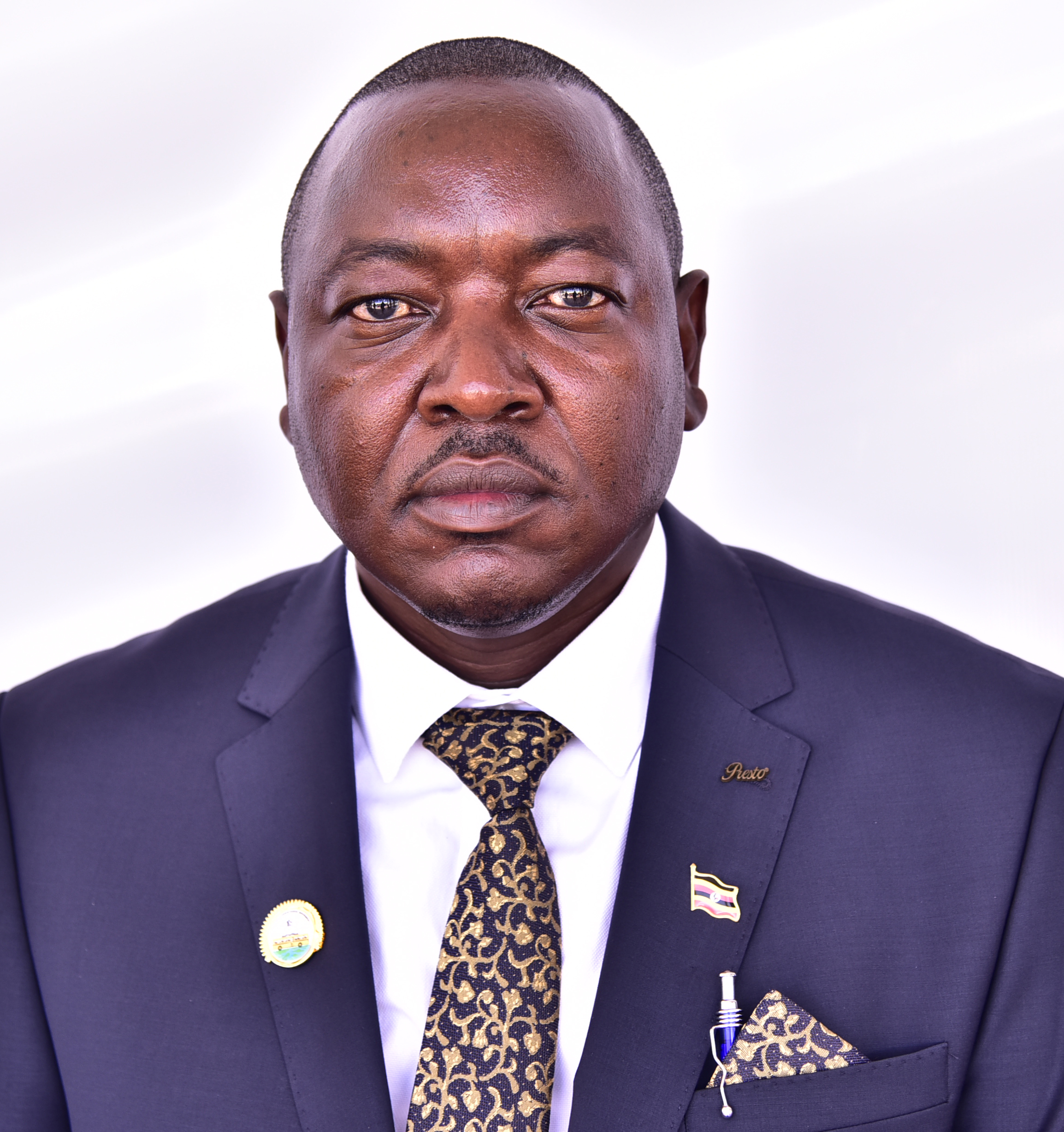
- Born: 24 October 1968 (age 57); Uganda
- Citizenship: Uganda
- Education: Makerere University (Bachelor of Medicine and Bachelor of Surgery) (Master of Public Health)
- Occupations: Physician and politician
- Years active: 1999–present
- Known for: Politics

Emmanuel Otiam Otala is a Ugandan physician and politician. He served as the State Minister for Labor in the Ugandan Cabinet from February 2009 until May 2011. Before that, he served as the State Minister of Health for Primary Care from June 2006 until February 2009. In the cabinet reshuffle of 27 May 2011, he was dropped and replaced by Mwesigwa Rukutana. He also served as the elected Member of Parliament (MP) for West Budama South Constituency, Tororo District, from 2006 until 2011. During the 2011 national elections, he lost to Jacob Marksons Oboth, an independent politician.

== Background and education ==
Otala was born on 24 October 1968 in Iyolwa Village in Tororo District. His father was Donosio Otala. He attended Makerere University Medical School where he graduated with a Bachelor of Medicine and Bachelor of Surgery degree.

== Work experience ==
From 1999 until 2000, Otala worked as a pharmaceutical sales representative for Medreich Sterilab Pharmaceutical Company, through Surgipharm (Uganda) Limited. He then worked as a medical officer at the Association for the Cooperation between Ticino, Switzerland and Uganda from 2000 until 2001. During the same period, he worked as the Deputy District Director of Health for West Budama South. From 2002 until 2004, he worked as a medical consultant with the Give Us Wings Children's Project, a Ugandan charitable non-government organization. From 2002 until 2005, Otala served as the medical director of the Tororo District Hospital.

== Political career ==
In 2006, he entered politics by contesting for the parliamentary seat in his home area on the National Resistance Movement political party ticket. He is a member of the National Resistance Movement

== See also ==
- Parliament of Uganda
