= Barbara Saben =

Ugandan politician

Nominated Member of the Legislative Council
- In office 1954–1961

Mayor of Kampala
- In office 1961–1962
- Preceded by: S. W. Kulubya
- Succeeded by: P.I. Patel

Personal details
- Born: 1912 India
- Died: 16 September 2014 (aged 102) United Kingdom

Dorothy Barbara Saben CBE (1912 – 16 September 2014) was a Ugandan politician. She and Alice Boase were appointed to the Legislative Council in 1954, becoming its first female members. Saben later served as the first female mayor of Kampala.

== Biography ==
Saben was born in India in 1912. After receiving a private education, she studied at St James College in London from 1931 to 1932. She moved to Uganda in 1940 with her businessman husband. She was a founder member of the Uganda Council of Women in 1946. In the 1951 New Year Honours she was awarded an MBE for her public service in Uganda. She was also a founder member of the National Council of Social Service, serving as its president.

In 1954 Saben and Alice Boase were appointed to the Legislative Council, becoming its first female members. Following the 1958 elections she became deputy chair of the Representative Members' Organisation, a grouping of the nominated members. She remained on the Council until 1961. Saben had also become a member of Kampala City Council when it was established. After serving as deputy mayor from 1959 to 1960, she became the first female mayor of the city in 1961, serving until 1962. She was awarded a CBE in the 1963 New Year Honours; later in the same year she resigned from the City Council.

She died in the United Kingdom in September 2014.
