= Alice Boase =

Ugandan politician

Nominated Member of the Legislative Council
- In office 1954–1956

Personal details
- Born: 23 March 1910 Dublin, United Kingdom
- Died: 1999 (aged 88–89) Haywards Heath, United Kingdom

Alice Mary Boase MBE (23 March 1910 – 1999) was a Ugandan politician. She and Barbara Saben were appointed to the Legislative Council in 1954, becoming its first female members.

== Biography ==
Boase was born 23 March 1910 in Dublin. When she was two her parents moved to Nyasaland after her father Charles had been appointed as a magistrate. The family moved to Uganda when Charles was appointed Chief Justice of the colony in 1921. In 1929 Alice married the physician Arthur Boase (1901–1986); the couple went on to have ten children.

She served as president of the Uganda Council of Women from 1953 to 1955, and sat on the board of the Uganda Club. Boase and her husband both became members of Kampala Municipal Council. In 1954 Boase and Barbara Saben were appointed to the Legislative Council, becoming its first female members. She left Uganda in 1956 when Arthur began working at Saint John Eye Hospital in Jerusalem. In 1969 they retired to Sussex in the United Kingdom. Boase died in Haywards Heath in 1999.

Her brother John had been appointed Chief Justice of Uganda in 1952 and became Speaker of the Legislative Council in 1958. An expanded edition of Boase's memoir, When The Sun Never Set, was published in 2005.
