= Edward Ssekandi =

Ugandan lawyer and politician

His Excellency Edward Kiwanuka Ssekandi
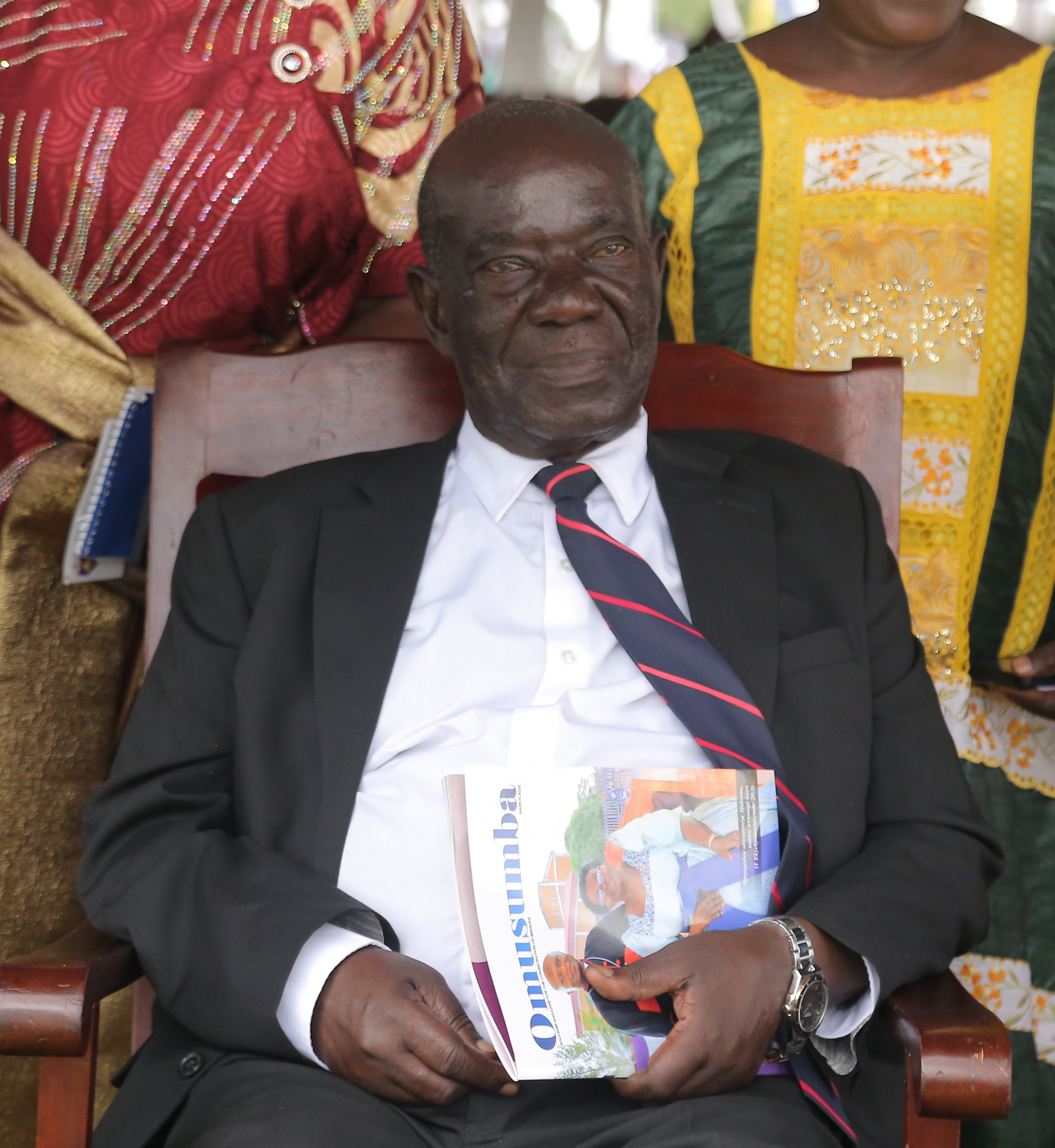
- Ssekandi in 2012

8th Vice President of Uganda
- In office 24 May 2011 – 21 June 2021
- President: Yoweri Museveni
- Prime Minister: Amama Mbabazi; Ruhakana Rugunda
- Preceded by: Gilbert Bukenya
- Succeeded by: Jessica Alupo

Speaker of the Parliament of Uganda
- In office 2001 – 19 May 2011
- Preceded by: Francis Ayume
- Succeeded by: Rebecca Kadaga

Member of the Parliament of Uganda
- In office 1996–2021

Personal details
- Born: Edward Kiwanuka Ssekandi; 19 January 1943 (age 83) Masaka, Protectorate of Uganda
- Party: National Resistance Movement
- Spouse: Margaret Ssekandi
- Education: Makerere University (LLB); Law Development Centre

Edward Kiwanuka Ssekandi (born 19 January 1943) is a Ugandan lawyer and politician who served as the 8th Vice President of Uganda until 2021. He was a member of the Parliament of Uganda from 1996 to 2021, and Speaker from 2001 to 2011.

== Early life ==
Edward Kiwanuka Ssekandi was born on 19 January 1943, to Alex Kiwanuka and Virgo Kiwanuka. He attended St. Mary's College Kisubi, received a bachelor's degree in law from the University of East Africa, and received a diploma from the Law Development Centre.

== Career ==
=== Legal ===
At the High Court of Uganda Ssekandi became an advocate in 1970. Ssekandi served as State Attorney from 1969 to 1973, and then worked as a lecturer at the Law Development Centre and Makerere University. He was Head of Post Graduate Bar Course from 1974 to 1978, and then acting director of the Law Development Centre. He opened a law firm, Ssekandi and Company Advocates, in 1979. From 1982 to 1985, Ssekandi was the chancellor of the Namirembe Diocese. He was the lead counsel for the Commission of Inquiry into Violations of Human Rights in Uganda from 1986 to 1993.

=== Parliament ===
Ssekandi won a seat in the Uganda Constituency Assembly in the 1994 election and helped create the Constitution of Uganda in 1995. He was elected to the Parliament of Uganda for Bukoto Central in 1996, and later joined the National Resistance Movement. During his tenure in parliament he was chair of the Rules, Privileges and Disciplinary, and the Legal and Parliamentary Affairs committees. He served as Deputy Speaker from 1998 to 2000, and then as Speaker from 2000 to 2011. Deputy Speaker Rebecca Kadaga was selected to succeed him as speaker.

Ssekandi was chair of the Parliamentary Union of the OIC Member States and in 2011, he became chair of the African Parliamentary Union.

=== Vice president ===
President Yoweri Museveni appointed Ssekandi as Vice President of Uganda on 24 May 2011. He lost reelection to his seat in parliament in 2021.

Edward Ssekandi has been a regular attendee and speaker at the annual Ugandan North American Association (UNAA) convention in the USA.

== Personal life ==
Ssekandi married Margret Ssekandi, with whom he had four children.

== Works cited ==
=== News ===
- Ategeka, Johnson (16 May 2021). "FULL LIST: Vice President Ssekandi, 21 Ministers Voted Out". The Tower Post. Archived from the original on 19 January 2021.
- Matsiko, Haggai (24 May 2011). "Former speaker Sekandi is new VP and Mbabazi Prime Minister". The Independent.
- Naturinda, Sheila (16 May 2011). "Uganda: Speaker Ssekandi Quits for Kadaga". Daily Monitor. Archived from the original on 28 June 2025.

=== Web ===
- "Edward Ssekandi". Uganda. Archived from the original on 24 April 2024.
- "The Vice President of Uganda". Embassy of the Republic of Uganda Japan. Archived from the original on 30 April 2024.

Parliament of Uganda
| Preceded by Francis Ayume | Speaker of Parliament; 2001–2011 | Succeeded by Rebecca Kadaga |
Political offices
| Preceded by Gilbert Bukenya | Vice President of Uganda; 2011–2021 | Succeeded by Jessica Alupo |
