= List of speakers of the Parliament of Uganda =

This is a list of speakers of the Parliament of Uganda, since 1962:

Legislature	Name	Period
1st Parliament (National Assembly) 1962–May 1966	John Bowes Griffin; Narendra M. Patel	1962–1963; 1963–May 1966
2nd Parliament (National Assembly) 1967–January 1971	Narendra M. Patel	1967–January 1971
No Legislative Arm of Government		1971–1979
3rd Parliament (National Consultative Council) 1979–1980	Edward Rugumayo (Chairman)	1979–1980
4th Parliament (National Assembly) 1980–27 July 1985	Francis K. Butagira	23 December 1980–27 July 1985
5th Parliament (National Resistance Council) 1986–1996	Yoweri Museveni (Chairman); Vice Chairman Al-Haji Moses Kigongo chaired most of NRC's meetings	26 January 1986–1996
6th Parliament (Parliament of Uganda) 1996–2001	James Wapakhabulo; Speaker of the Constituent Assembly 1994–1995; Francis Ayume	1996–1998; 1998–2001
7th Parliament (Parliament of Uganda) 2001–2006	Edward Ssekandi	July 2001–2006
8th Parliament (Parliament of Uganda) 2006–2011	Edward Ssekandi	18 May 2006–2011
9th Parliament (Parliament of Uganda) 2011–2016	Rebecca Kadaga	19 May 2011 – 2016
10th Parliament (Parliament of Uganda) 2016–2021	Rebecca Kadaga	19 May 2016 – 2021
11th Parliament (Parliament of Uganda) 2021-2026	Jacob L'Okori Oulanyah	24 May 2021- 20 March 2022
11th Parliament (Parliament of Uganda) 2021-2026	Anita Annet Among	25 March 2022 - present
