= John Bashaija Kazoora =

Ugandan soldier, politician, and author (1958–2025)

- Born: August 4, 1958; Rutooma, Mbarara District, Uganda
- Died: April 20, 2025 (aged 66); Rutooma, Kashari, Mbarara District, Uganda
- Education: Political science
- Alma mater: Makerere University
- Occupations: Soldier, politician, author
- Years active: 1982–2025
- Known for: Member of Parliament (1996–2006), co-founder of Forum for Democratic Change (FDC)
- Notable work: Betrayed by My Leader (2012)
- Political party: Forum for Democratic Change (FDC) (after 2005)
- Other political affiliations: National Resistance Movement (NRM) (before 2005)
- Spouse: Naome Kabasharira
- Children: 4 sons

John Bashaija Kazoora (August 4, 1958 – April 20, 2025) was a Ugandan soldier, politician, and author who retired at the rank of major. In 1982, he joined the National Resistance Army (NRA) where he played a vital role in the bush war that brought President Yoweri Museveni to power in 1986.

== Background and education ==
Kazoora was born in Rutooma in Mbarara district, South Western Uganda to Enoch Kazoora (father), a former serviceman in the King's African Rifles and a driver in the Ankole Kingdom, and Manjeri (mother), a disciplinarian who emphasized education and faith. He was the youngest of eight children.

Kazoora started his education at Rutooma Primary School, then joined Nyakasura School, where he formed lifelong friendships with future national figures like Benon Biraaro and David Sejusa. He joined Makerere University and graduated with a bachelor's in political science. In 1982, shortly after completing his degree, he joined the NRA guerrilla war that brought President Yoweri Museveni to power in 1986.

== Political career and opposition ==
Kazorora was a representative of Kashari County, Mbarara district between the 1996 and 2006 Sixth and Seventh Parliaments. He was a strong constitutionalist and one of the few members of parliament from Ankole to oppose lifting term limits, when it happened in 2005. In disillusionment with the National Resistance Movement (NRM) he cofounded the Forum for Democratic Change (FDC) as Secretary for Defense, Security and Internal Affairs.

== Memoir: Betrayed by My Leader ==
In 2012, Kazoora published his memoir, Betrayed by My Leader, offering an unflinching account of Uganda’s post-liberation politics. The book chronicles his journey from a committed NRA cadre to a critic of what he perceived as the erosion of democratic values under President Museveni. He expressed regret over his military rank, stating that he never intended to have a military career and felt conscripted into the army.

== Death and legacy ==
Kazoora died on 20 April 2025, at the age of 67 after a lingering illness. He was interred in Rutooma, Kashari, Mbarara District, where he had been born. His burial was a show of unity across ideologies; he was called a man of honor and ultimate patriot.
