= John Bowes Griffin =

Ugandan politician

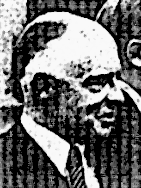
John Bowes Griffin, Chief Justice of Uganda

Sir John Bowes Griffin QC (19 April 1903 – 2 February 1992) was a British lawyer and judge. He served as a government lawyer and judge in a number of British colonies in the mid 20th Century.

His last positions were as chief justice of the Supreme Court of Uganda and speaker of the Ugandan Parliament.

== Early life ==
Griffin was born on 19 April 1903. He was the only son of Charles James Griffin, who had served as attorney general of Gibraltar, chief justice of the Leeward Islands, and chief justice of Uganda.

Griffin was educated at Clongowes in County Kildare. He attended Trinity College Dublin where he graduated with a Master of Arts and a Doctor of Laws and Cambridge. He was called to the bar of the Inner Temple in 1926.

== Legal appointments ==
Soon after being called to the bar, in 1927, Griffin was appointed an administrative officer in Uganda. In 1929, he was appointed assistant district officer and registrar of the High Court. In the early 1930s, he was appointed Crown Counsel and in that position acted as solicitor general and attorney general for various periods. He was appointed attorney general in the Bahamas (1936–39), acting as governor and chief justice for various periods. He was made a King's Counsel while serving in the Bahamas. He was appointed a KC for the Bahamas in 1938.

In 1939, he was appointed solicitor general of Palestine. At the end of World War II, in 1946, he was appointed attorney general of Hong Kong, serving there until 1951.

In 1952, Griffin returned to Uganda as chief justice and served in that position until his early retirement due to ill health in December 1956. He was knighted in 1955.

== Post-retirement appointments ==
Griffin acted as chief justice of Northern Rhodesia (now Zambia) in 1957. From 1958 to 1962, he served as the speaker of the Uganda Legislative Council (a body which his sister Alice had become the first female member of in 1954), and from 1962 to 1963 as the speaker of the Ugandan National Assembly.

He was made a commander of the Venerable Order of St John in 1960.

He was appointed to a number of other positions in Africa until his final retirement in 1965.

== Death ==
Griffin retired to Sliema, Malta where he lived on the Tigne Sea Front.

He died on 2 February 1992.

Legal offices
Preceded by C. Grenville Alabaster	Attorney General of Hong Kong; 1946 – 1951	Succeeded by Arthur Ridehalgh
