= Francis Ayume =

Ugandan lawyer and politician

- Born: August 18, 1940; Koboko, Uganda
- Died: May 16, 2004 (aged 63); Nakasongola, Uganda
- Education: Makerere University (Bachelor of Laws); Law Development Centre (Diploma in Legal Practice)
- Occupations: Lawyer; politician
- Years active: 1962—2004
- Spouse: Elizabeth Ayume

Francis Joash Ayume (1940–2004), was a Ugandan politician and lawyer. At the time of his death, he was the incumbent Attorney General of Uganda. He has also served as Speaker of Uganda’s 6th Parliament from 1998 to 2001.

== Early life and education ==
He was born on 18 August 1940, in Koboko District to Misaeli Onale, an elementary school teacher. Ayume attended Nyangilia Primary School in Koboko for his primary schooling. He attended Busoga College Mwiri for his O-Level and A-Level studies, graduating in 1964.

He was admitted to the University of Dar es Salaam, where he studied law, graduating in 1967. Later, he was awarded a Diploma in Legal Practice from the Law Development Centre in Kampala, Uganda's capital city.

== Career ==
During the 1990s, Ayume entered Ugandan elective politics and was elected to Uganda's parliament to represent Koboko District. From 1998 until 2001, he served as Speaker of the Parliament during Uganda's Sixth Parliament (1996–2001). "In 2001, he was appointed Attorney General and represented Uganda in the International Court of Justice in a case where Uganda was accused of invading DR Congo and allegedly plundering its natural resources". On Sunday 16 May 2004, he was involved in a fatal automobile accident at Nakasongola on the Kampala-Gulu Highway.

== Works ==
Francis Ayume authored a book "Criminal Procedure And Law in Uganda". The book is incorporated in the curriculum at Makerere University School of Law.

== Death ==
Ayume died from injuries sustained in a tragic motor vehicle accident on Sunday, May 16, 2004 along on the Kampala-Gulu highway.

== See Also ==
- Edward Rugumayo
- Parliament of Uganda
- Alexander Waibale
