= Edward Rugumayo =

Ugandan politician, academic and diplomat

University Chancellor Kampala University and Mountains of the Moon University

Personal details
- Born: 18 December 1934 (age 91) Kyenjojo District, Uganda
- Citizenship: Uganda
- Relatives: no:Hangi Ulv Amundsen (Grandson)
- Education: University of London (Bachelor of Science); University of Liverpool (Diploma in Education); Church of England (Certificate in Religious Studies)
- Occupation: Environmentalist, politician & academic
- Known for: Politics, Academics

Edward Bitanywaine Rugumayo (born 18 December 1934) is a Ugandan politician, diplomat, writer, academic and environmentalist. He has previously served as cabinet minister in three Ugandan administrations. From 1979 until 1980, Rugumayo served as the Chairman of the Uganda Consultative Council. He currently serves as the chancellor of two Ugandan universities. He is a botanist and a community leader.

== History ==
Rugumayo was born in Kyenjojo District, then known as Mwenge County, on 18 December 1934.

== Education ==
He attended Mukole Primary School in Kyenjojo District from P1 to P4. He then attended Galihuma Primary School from P5 to P6. For S1 to S3, he attended Kabarole Junior Secondary School, and for S4 to S6, he attended Nyakasura School, in Fort Portal. He was admitted to Makerere University in the mid 1950s, but he quit when the university did not offer him the course he wanted; he was offered Agriculture, but he wanted Medicine. He was offered a scholarship to go and study in the United States of America, but was denied a passport by the British Colonial Administration. Instead, in 1958, they gave him a scholarship to study in the United Kingdom. He studied for the Diploma in Education at Chester College, then a constituent college of the University of Liverpool. He then studied at the University of London, where he graduated with the degree of Bachelor of Science in Botany and Ecology.

== Political career ==
When Rugumayo returned to Uganda in 1966, he taught briefly at Kyambogo before joining Makerere University, as the warden of Mitchell Hall, one of the halls of residence. In 1971, Idi Amin successfully led a coup d'état against the Obote I administration. Rugumayo was appointed Minister of Education, through connections with his friend Wanume Kibedi, a lawyer, with whom they had studied in London and who was an in-law to Idi Amin. Kibedi was appointed Minister of Foreign Affairs. In February 1973, one year and eight months on the job, Rugumayo resigned from Amin's cabinet; the first member of the cabinet to resign. He went into exile in Nairobi, Kenya and Lusaka, Zambia, staying there until 1979, when Amin's regime was toppled.

After the Uganda National Liberation Army (UNLA) and the Uganda National Liberation Front (UNLF) captured power in Kampala, with the assistance of the Tanzania People's Defence Force (TPDF), Rugumayo was appointed chairman of the National Consultative Council (NCC), the parliament of the time. Rugumayo was instrumental in removing Yusuf Lule from power, when Lule disagreed with the NCC on procedural protocol when making cabinet appointments. Lule was replaced by Godfrey Binaisa. In May 1980, while Rugumayo was in Arusha, Tanzania, the Binaisa administration was also deposed in another coup d'état. This time Rugumayo stayed in exile until 1992. That year, he returned to Uganda and joined the National Resistance Movement administration of Yoweri Museveni.

== Academic and political appointments ==
He has formerly held the following positions in the Ugandan Government, International Organizations and Universities:

- As Senior Science Inspector of Schools, while teaching at the Institute of Teacher Education, Kyambogo; now part of Kyambogo University, from 1968 until 11969.
- As Warden of Mitchell Hall, and lecturer, Department of Education, Makerere University, from 1970 until 1971.
- As Minister of Education from June 1971 until February 1973 under Idi Amin
- As Senior Lecturer, then Associate Professor and then Dean, School of Education at the University of Zambia, between 1973 and 1979
- As Chairman of the National Consultative Council from April 1979 until May 1980
- As Senior Consultant on Environmental Education; Training and Project Design for UNEP, UNDP, UNESCO, World Bank and other NGOs based in Nairobi.
- As Visiting Professor of Environment at Oklahoma State University and Moscow State University
- As Chairperson of a 12-person team of consultants hired to establish the School of Environmental Studies at Moi University in Kenya, in 1989.
- As Visiting UNDP/UNEP Professor of Environment at Moi University.
- As Senior Programme Coordinator of Environment Liaison Centre International, a global coalition of environment NGOs based in Nairobi, from June 1992 until May 1995.
- As Chief Technical Advisor on Environment to with the Government of Lesotho, from July 1995 to July 1996, assigned by the United Nations Development Programme (UNDP).
- As Uganda's first Ambassador to South Africa from 1996 until 1999
- As Minister of Internal Affairs from 199 until 2000
- As Minister of Tourism, Trade and Industry, from 2000 until 2005.

In 2005, during a cabinet reshuffle, Rugumayo was appointed Uganda's ambassador to France, a position which he turned down.

== Other considerations ==
Rugumayo started Tooro Botanical Gardens, a 40 hectares (99 acres), natural tropical forest with rare native flora, with medicinal, dye-producing and perfumed plant species. It is the only other botanical gardens in Uganda, other than the government-owned Entebbe Botanical Gardens in Entebbe, on the shores of Lake Victoria. He also owns a mixed diary and crop farm measuring 20 hectares (49 acres), where he also maintains an apiary.

In 2004, Edward Rugumayo, then Uganda’s Minister of Trade, Tourism, and Industry, made a significant decision to ban the importation and sale of Tiger Head dry cells. This move was driven by concerns over the quality and safety of these batteries, which were widely used but deemed substandard. The ban was seen as a long-overdue measure to protect consumers from potentially hazardous products. Rugumayo’s decision was part of broader efforts to regulate and improve the quality of goods in the Ugandan market, reflecting his commitment to consumer protection and public safety.

== See also ==
- Parliament of Uganda
- Cabinet of Uganda
- Kyenjojo District
- New Vision
- Alexander Waibale
