= Jacob Oulanyah =

Ugandan lawyer and politician (1965–2022)

The Right Honourable Jacob Oulanyah
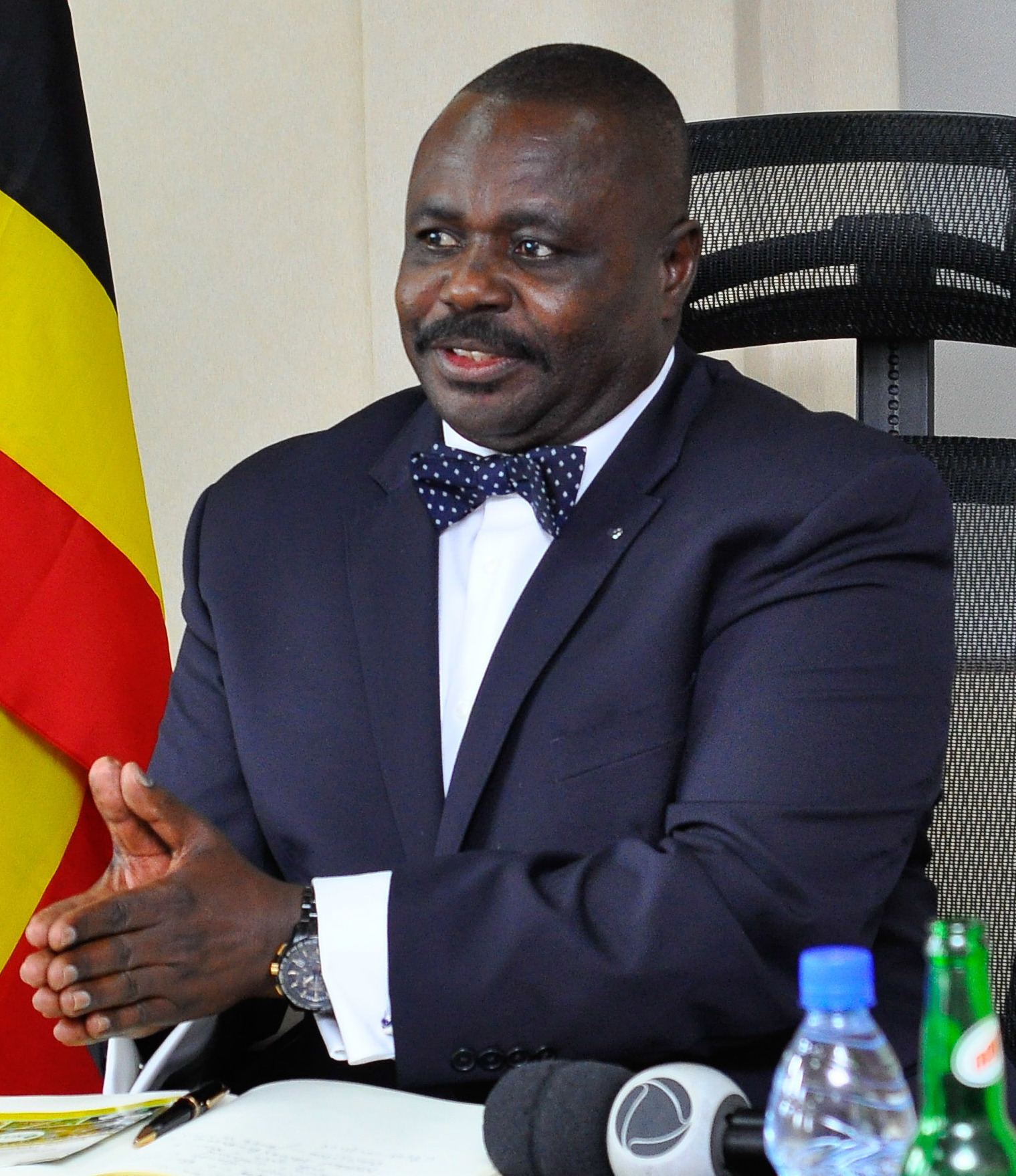
- Oulanyah in 2018

Speaker of the Parliament of Uganda
- In office 24 May 2021 – 20 March 2022
- President: Yoweri Museveni
- Preceded by: Rebecca Kadaga
- Succeeded by: Anita Among

Personal details
- Born: Jacob L'Okori Oulanyah; 23 March 1965 Gulu, Uganda
- Died: 20 March 2022 (aged 56) Seattle, Washington, U.S.
- Education: Makerere University (Bachelor of Arts) (Bachelor of Laws); Law Development Centre (Diploma in Legal Practice)
- Occupation: Lawyer, politician

Jacob L'Okori Oulanyah (23 March 1965 – 20 March 2022) was a Ugandan agricultural economist, lawyer, and politician, who served as the speaker of the 11th Parliament of Uganda from 2021 to 2022. He was elected to that position on 24 May 2021, after defeating his tenacious rival, incumbent Speaker Rebecca Alitwala Kadaga.

He served as deputy speaker of the Ugandan parliament, from May 2011 until May 2021. Oulanyah was also the member of parliament representing the Omoro County constituency, Omoro District, Acholi sub-region, in the Uganda's Northern Region.

== Early life and education ==
Oulanyah was born on 23 March 1965 in the Gulu District to Nathan L'okori and Karen Atwon. He attended St. Joseph's College Layibi, Dr. Obote College Boroboro, and Kololo Senior Secondary School for his O-Level and A-Level education. In 1988, he joined Makerere University, the oldest university in the East African Community, where he studied agricultural economics. He graduated in 1991 with a Bachelor of Arts in that subject. That same year, he entered law school, also at Makerere University, graduating in 1994 with a Bachelor of Laws degree. He served as speaker of the university students' guild during his stay at Makerere. In 1995, he attended the Law Development Centre (LDC), where he obtained a postgraduate diploma in legal practice.

== Career ==
Following his graduation from the LDC, Oulanyah worked as a lecturer at the centre. During the same timeframe, he began private law practice at the law firm of Oulanyah, Onoria & Company Advocates. In 2001, he entered mainstream politics by successfully contesting the parliamentary seat of Omoro County, in the then Gulu District under the no-party system also known as the Movement Political System. He was, however, a cardholder of the Uganda People's Congress (UPC). He also participated in the peace talks between the government of Uganda and the Lord's Resistance Army rebels. In 2006, standing as a UPC candidate, he lost his re-election bid. In July 2006, he quit the UPC and joined the ruling National Resistance Movement (NRM). In 2008, he served as the chairman of the commission of inquiry into the controversial sub-lease of Kisekka Market, one of the municipal markets in the city of Kampala. In March 2011, Oulanyah was elected to represent Omoro County then in Gulu District, in the Ninth Parliament, this time on the NRM ticket. He was elected as Deputy Speaker of Parliament on 19 May 2011.

Following the February 2016 general election, Oulanyah was re-elected as deputy speaker of Parliament on 19 May 2016. In the vote, conducted by secret ballot, he received 300 votes, while Muhammad Nsereko received 115.

On 13 July 2019, Oulanyah was awarded an honorary Doctorate of Divinity by Zoe Life Theological College USA and acquired the title of doctor, enabling him to be called Rt. Hon. Dr. Jacob L. Oulanyah.

On 24 May 2021, Oulanyah was voted speaker of Parliament in a race against his former boss, Rt. Hon. Rebecca Kadaga and Kira Municipality MP, Ibrahim Ssemujju. Oulanyah obtained 310 votes against Kadaga's 197 and Ssemujju's 15.

== Parliamentary duties ==
Oulanyah was the national speaker of parliament sitting on the following parliamentary committees:

- Appointments Committee – The Committee reviews all Cabinet appointments by the President and may approve or reject an appointment: The Deputy Speaker is the vice chairperson of that committee.

== Illness and death ==
Shortly after his election as speaker, Oulanyah went to the United Kingdom for over a month. There were reports that he had contracted COVID-19, and flown to the UK for treatment. Officially, however, he was stated to have been visiting one of his children.

Subsequently, most of Oulanyah's duties were handled by Deputy Speaker Anita Among, fuelling further speculation about Oulanyah's health. He last presided over Parliament on 21 December 2021. On 4 February 2022, he was flown via Iceland to Seattle, in the United States, for treatment of an unspecified illness. An Airbus A330-800 was chartered from Uganda Airlines for the purpose, at a cost to the Ugandan taxpayer of USh 1.7 billion (US$460,000, €440,000).

It later emerged that Among had checked on Oulanyah at his home on 29 January after she and other associates of his had been unable to contact him by telephone for three days. She found him in bed, having difficulty speaking; he had not eaten in three days. He was taken to Mulago National Referral Hospital, where his doctors recommended that he be flown out of Uganda for treatment. On 15 March, Among, Democratic Party President Norbert Mao – longtime friend and associate of Oulanyah, and three others flew to Seattle to check on Oulanyah. Around this time, the Wikipedia article of Oulanyah was changed to indicate that he had died. Chris Obore, director communication and public affairs for the Ugandan Parliament, subsequently claimed on Twitter that "hackers" using a virtual private network had altered the article.

Oulanyah died on 20 March 2022, in Seattle. His death was announced by Ugandan President Yoweri Museveni, on Museveni's Twitter account. His father Nathan L'okori subsequently claimed that Oulanyah "did not die of natural causes, he was poisoned". According to him, the speaker had told him of the poisoning following his appointment. Information minister Chris Baryomunsi denied this allegation, requesting the public to "ignore" it.

Oulanyah was buried on 8 April 2022 at his ancestral home in Lalogi, Omoro District.

Preceded by Rebecca Kadaga	Speaker of Parliament; 2021 – 2022	Succeeded by Anita Among
Preceded by Rebecca Kadaga	Deputy Speaker of Parliament; 2011 – 2021	Succeeded by Anita Among
