= Rebecca Kadaga =

Ugandan lawyer and politician (born 1956)

The Right Honourable Rebecca Kadaga
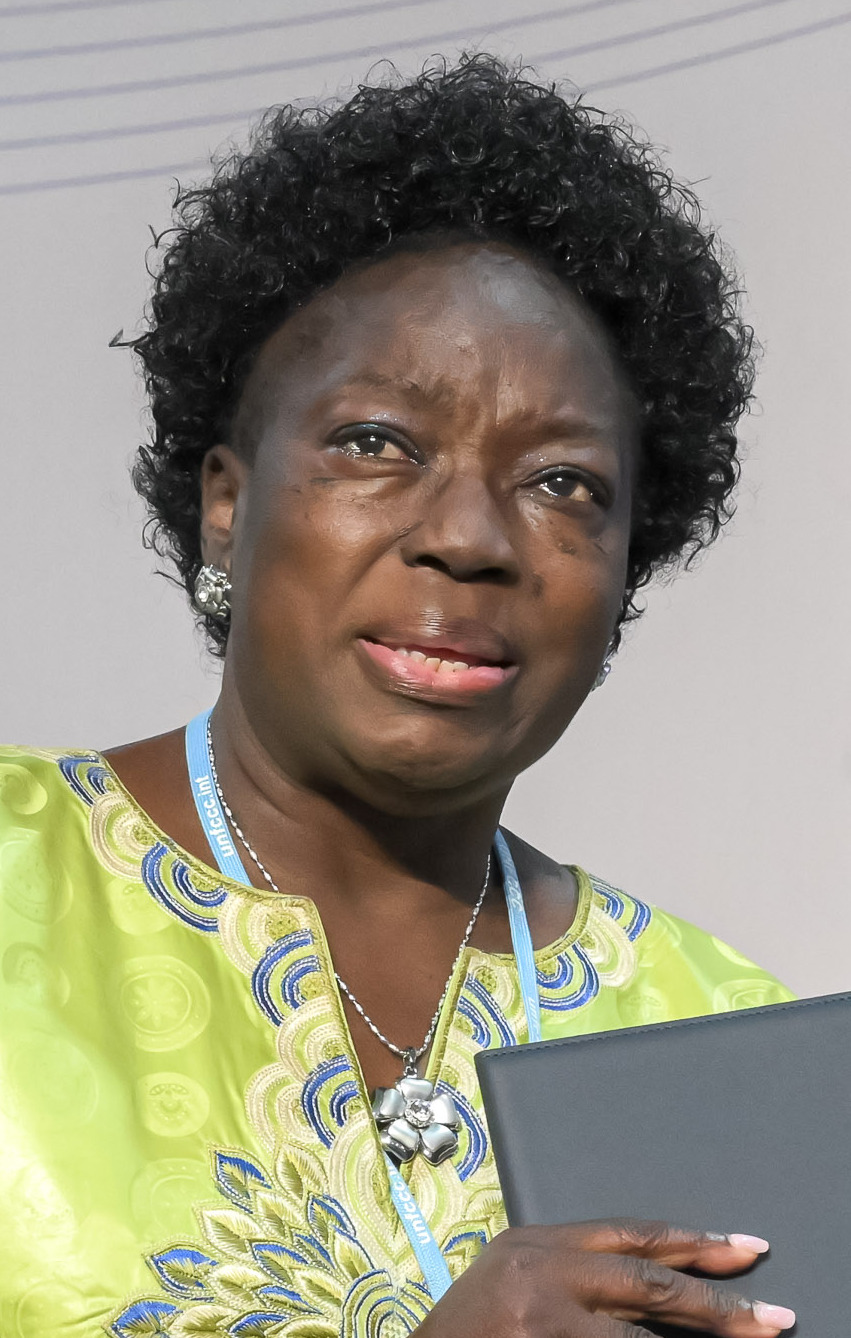
- Kadaga in 2022

First Deputy Prime Minister of Uganda
- Incumbent
- Assumed office 21 June 2021
- President: Yoweri Museveni
- Prime Minister: Robinah Nabbanja
- Preceded by: Moses Ali

Speaker of the Parliament of Uganda
- In office 19 May 2011 – 24 May 2021
- Preceded by: Edward Ssekandi
- Succeeded by: Jacob Oulanyah

Personal details
- Born: 24 May 1956 (age 70) Kamuli, Protectorate of Uganda
- Citizenship: Ugandan
- Party: National Resistance Movement
- Education: Makerere University (LLB); Law Development Center (Diploma in Legal Practice); University of Zimbabwe (MA), (Diploma in Women's Law); Nkumba University (Honorary LLD)
- Occupation: Lawyer and politician

Rebecca Alitwala Kadaga (born 24 May 1956) is a Ugandan lawyer and politician serving as the first deputy prime minister of Uganda and the minister for East African Community Affairs, in the Cabinet of Uganda in the eleventh and twelfth Parliament of Uganda. She previously served as the speaker of the Parliament of Uganda from 19 May 2011 to May 2021.

She was the first woman to be elected deputy speaker and, later, speaker in the history of the Parliament of Uganda. She succeeded Edward Ssekandi, who served as speaker from 2001 to 2011.

She is also the current member of Parliament for the Kamuli District Women's Constituency, Busoga sub-region, a position she has held since 1989.

== Early life and education ==
Rebecca Kadaga was born on 24 May 1956 in Kamuli District, Eastern Uganda.

She attended Namasagali College for her high school education. She studied law at Makerere University, graduating with a degree of Bachelor of Laws (LLB) in 1978. She went on to obtain a diploma in Legal practice from the Law Development Center in Kampala in 1979. In 2000, she obtained a Diploma in Women's Law from the University of Zimbabwe. In 2003, she obtained a degree of Master of Arts (MA), specializing in Women's Law, also from the University of Zimbabwe. In 2019, Nkumba University, a private university in Uganda, awarded Kadaga an honorary Doctor of Laws degree.

== Career ==
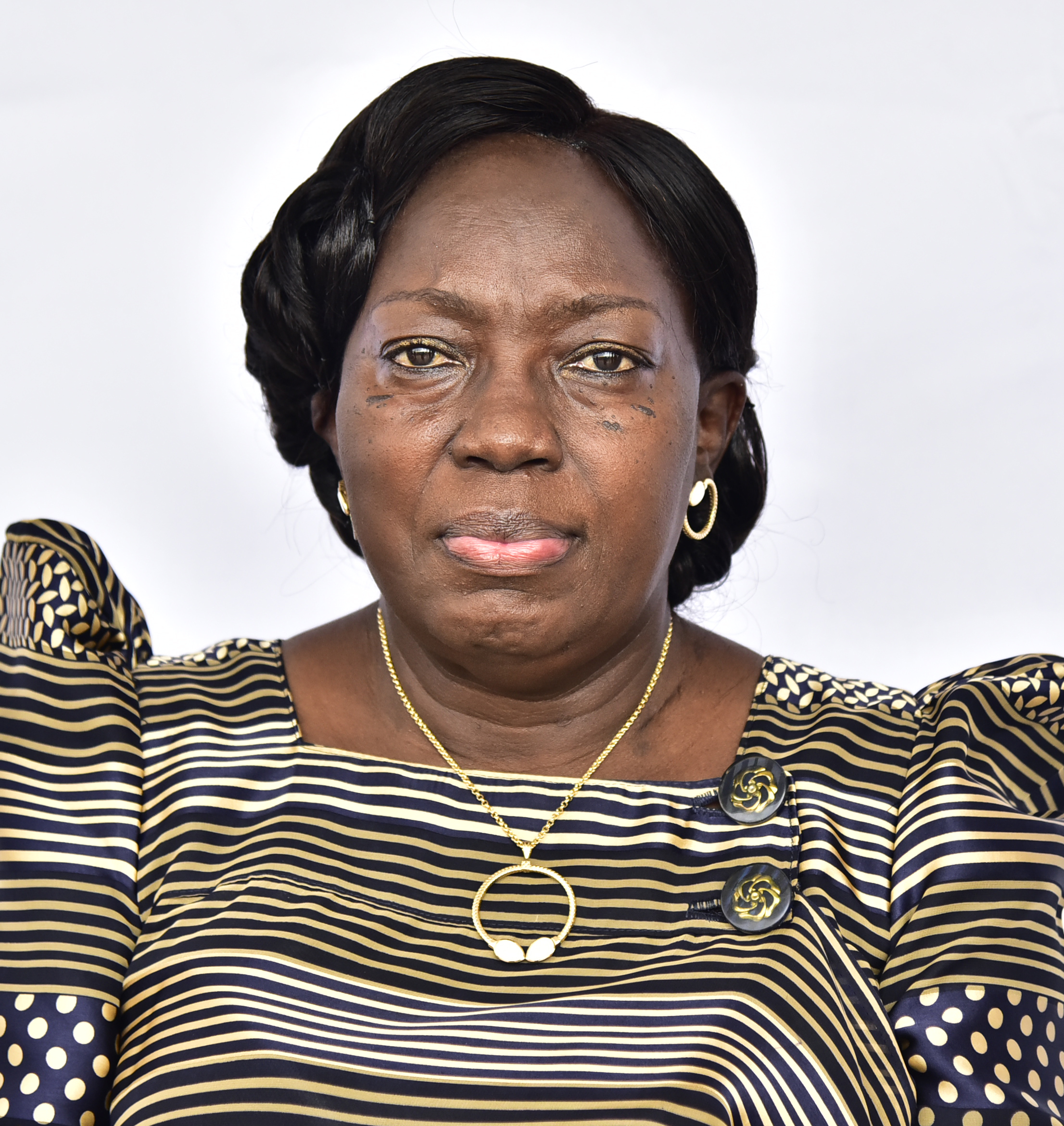
Rebecca Kadaga

Between 1984 and 1988, Kadaga was in private law practice. From 1989 to 1996, she served as the member of parliament for Kamuli District in the District Woman's nstituency. She served as the chairperson of the University Council for Mbarara University between 1993 and 1996. In 1996, she served as secretary general of the East African Women Parliamentarians Association.

From 1996 to 1998, Kadaga was the Ugandan minister of State for Regional Cooperation (Africa and the Middle East). From 1998 to 1999, she was minister of State for Communication and Aviation, and from 1999 to 2000, she was minister of Parliamentary Affairs. She was elected as deputy speaker of Parliament in 2001, a position that she held until 19 May 2011, when she was elected speaker of Parliament.

Following the February 2016 general election, Kadaga was unanimously re-elected as speaker of Parliament on 19 May 2016.

In August 2016, Kadaga and Deputy Speaker Jacob Oulanyah travelled with separate delegations to attend the 28th annual Ugandan North American Association (UNAA) convention in Boston, United States, and the trip was reported to have forced Parliament to adjourn amid a public dispute over travel costs and who would remain to chair the House. The Daily Monitor coverage of the Boston UNAA trip included claims that 78 MPs were in Boston and that Shs. 2 billion were spent, which Parliament disputed.

On 20 December 2017, Kadaga presided over the Ugandan Parliament session that passed a constitutional amendment which, among other measures, eliminated the requirement for candidates running for the presidency to be younger than 75 years of age. The amendment essentially gave Yoweri Museveni leeway to run for president of Uganda for his sixth term in office.

On 14 January 2021, Kadaga was re-elected to Parliament as a Woman Representative for Kamuli District. Consequently, she embarked on a campaign to retain her position as Speaker of Parliament for a third term. Kadaga lost the Speaker Vote to her former deputy Jacob Oulanyah after falling out of favour with her party, the National Resistance Movement (NRM).

On 15 January 2026, Kadaga was re-elected as a member of parliament for women representative Kamuli District and in May 2026, she was reappointed 1st deputy prime minister and minister for East African affairs.

From 2015 to 2026, Kadaga was second national vice chairperson (female) on the NRM Central Executive Committee (CEC), a position she lost to Anita Among in 2025.

== Parliamentary duties ==
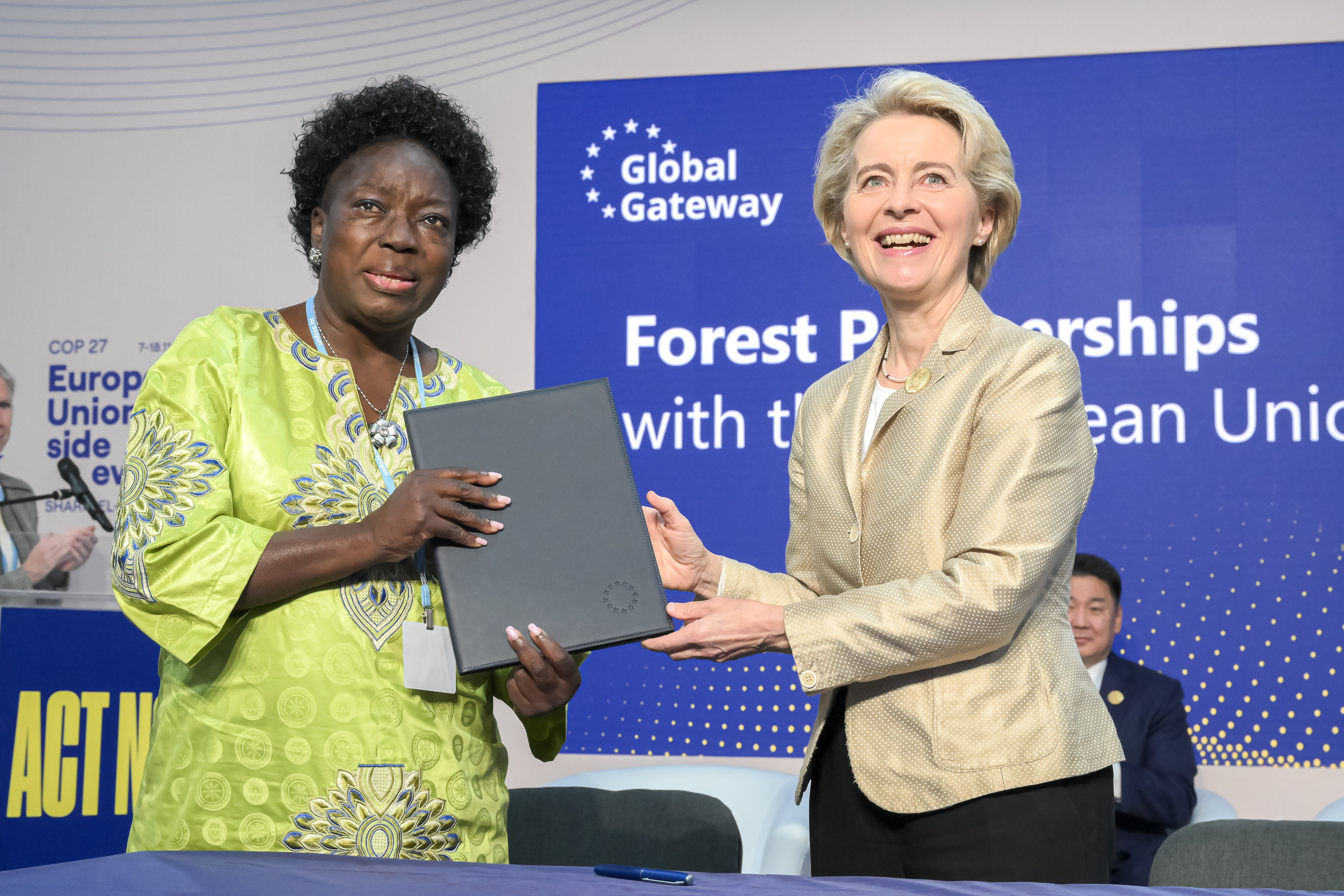
Kadaga and Ursula von der Leyen, 2022

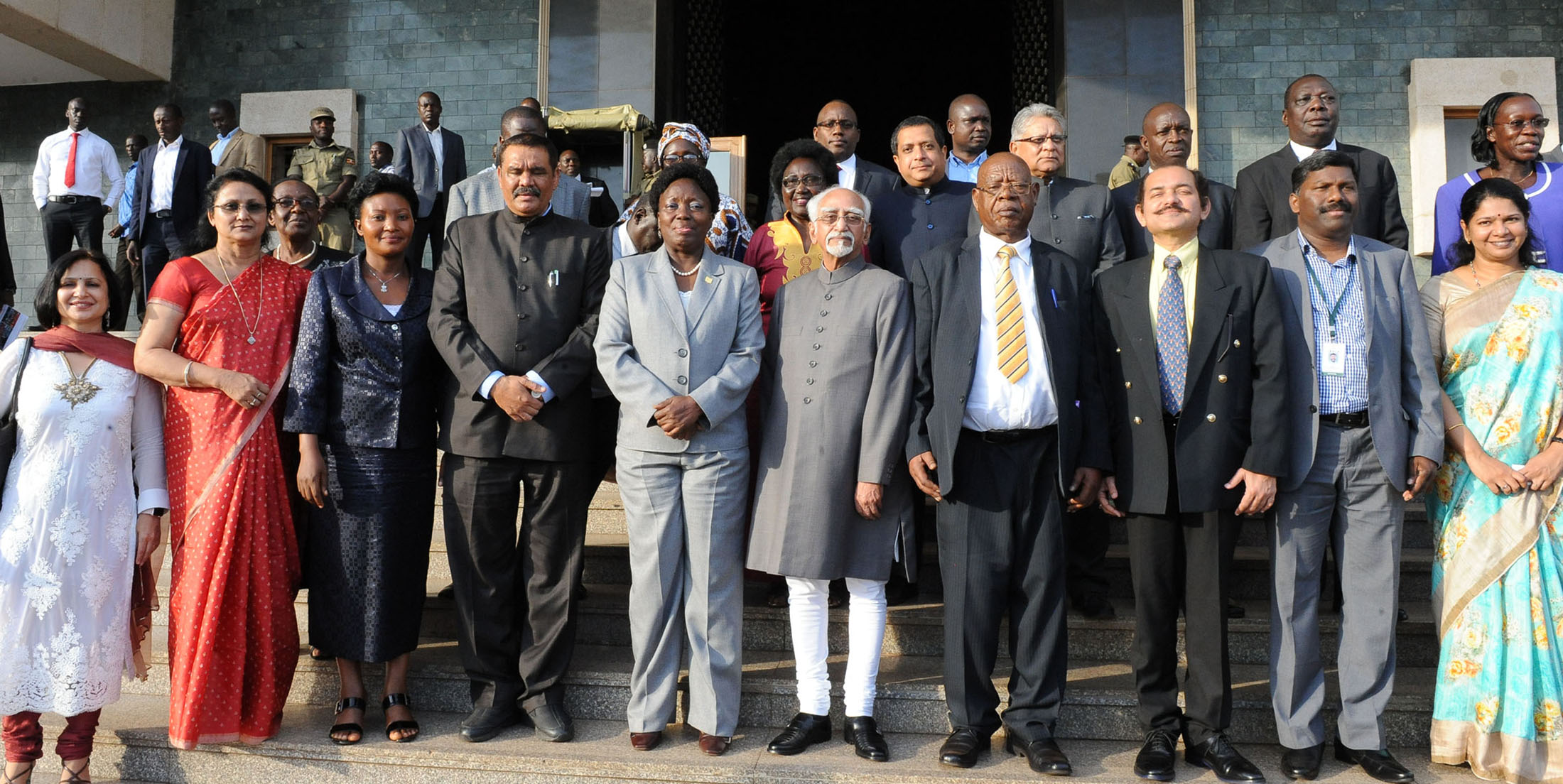
Vice President Shri M. Hamid Ansari with Kadaga, in Kampala

Besides her duties as speaker of the Ugandan Parliament, Kadaga sat on the following parliamentary committees:

- Appointments Committee – The committee reviews all cabinet appointments by the president, and may approve or reject an appointment: The speaker chairs the committee.
- The Parliamentary Commission – The speaker chairs the commission.
- The Business Committee – The speaker chairs the committee.

== Controversy ==
Kadaga vowed to pass the Uganda Anti-Homosexuality Bill through parliament by December 2012. The bill – sometimes referred to as the "Kill the Gays bill" – at one time sought to make acts of homosexuality punishable by death or life imprisonment but later removed the death penalty option from the bill. She says it will become law since most Ugandans "are demanding it".

In December 2012, Kadaga was in Rome to give a speech at the Seventh Session of the Consultative Assembly of Parliamentarians for the International Criminal Court and the Rule of Law.

Reports circulated that Kadaga received a blessing from Pope Benedict XVI at a Vatican mass. Soon after the news broke, Vatican spokesman Father Federico Lombardi issued a statement that said: "relations with the delegation were not out of the ordinary and no blessing was given." The group of Ugandan MPs greeted the Pope "just like any other individuals attending an audience with the Pope would" and this was "by no means a specific sign of approval of Kadaga’s actions or proposals."

In March 2020, during the COVID-19 pandemic, Kadaga tweeted that a "spray, which instantly kills the Corona virus, has been discovered & is to be co-produced in Uganda". She gave the impression that what was later on to be understood as a simple sanitizer was actually treatment for COVID-19 and received so much backlash from Ugandans on social media and professional bodies in the medical field like the Uganda Medical Association, and the Pharmaceutical Society of Uganda. She hit back by calling the people of the Association brainless.

In April 2020, Kadaga and her fellow members of parliament allocated to themselves over 10 billion Ugandan shillings of what was meant to be relief funds for efforts to fight against the pandemic and its associated socio-economic disruptions (equal at the time to $2.6 million).

== See also ==
- List of speakers of the Parliament of Uganda

Parliament of Uganda
Preceded by Edward Ssekandi	Speaker of Parliament; 2011–2021	Succeeded by Jacob Oulanyah
