= Parliament of Uganda =

Unicameral legislature of Uganda

Parliament of Uganda Bunge la Uganda
- Twelfth Parliament

Type
- Type: Unicameral

History
- Founded: 1962
- Preceded by: Legislative Council
- New session started: 25 May 2026

Leadership
- Speaker: Jacob Oboth-Oboth, NRM since 25 May 2026
- Deputy Speaker: Thomas Tayebwa, NRM since 25 March 2022
- Prime Minister: Robinah Nabbanja, NRM since 21 June 2021
- Government Chief Whip: Justine Lumumba Kasule, NRM since 25 May 2026
- Leader of the Opposition: Joel Ssenyonyi, NUP since 9 January 2024
- Chief Opposition Whip: Paul Mwiru, NUP since 28 May 2026

Structure
- Seats: 529
- Political groups: Government (359): NRM (359); Opposition (77): NUP (48); UPC (10); FDC (10); DP (6); People’s Front for Freedom (2); Alliance for National Transformation (1); Others: Independents (63); Ex officio members (20); Military (10)
- Length of term: 5 years

Elections
- Voting system: Parallel voting: First-past-the-post voting (499 seats) (Note: Of the 499 seats, 353 are elected by constituency, while 146 seats reserved for women are elected by district.); Indirect election (30 seats) (Note: Out of the 30 seats, 10 are reserved for the Uganda People's Defence Force, while 5 seats each are allocated to the youth, the elderly, workers, and citizens with disabilities.)
- First election: 25 April 1962
- Last election: 15 January 2026
- Next election: 15 January 2031

Meeting place
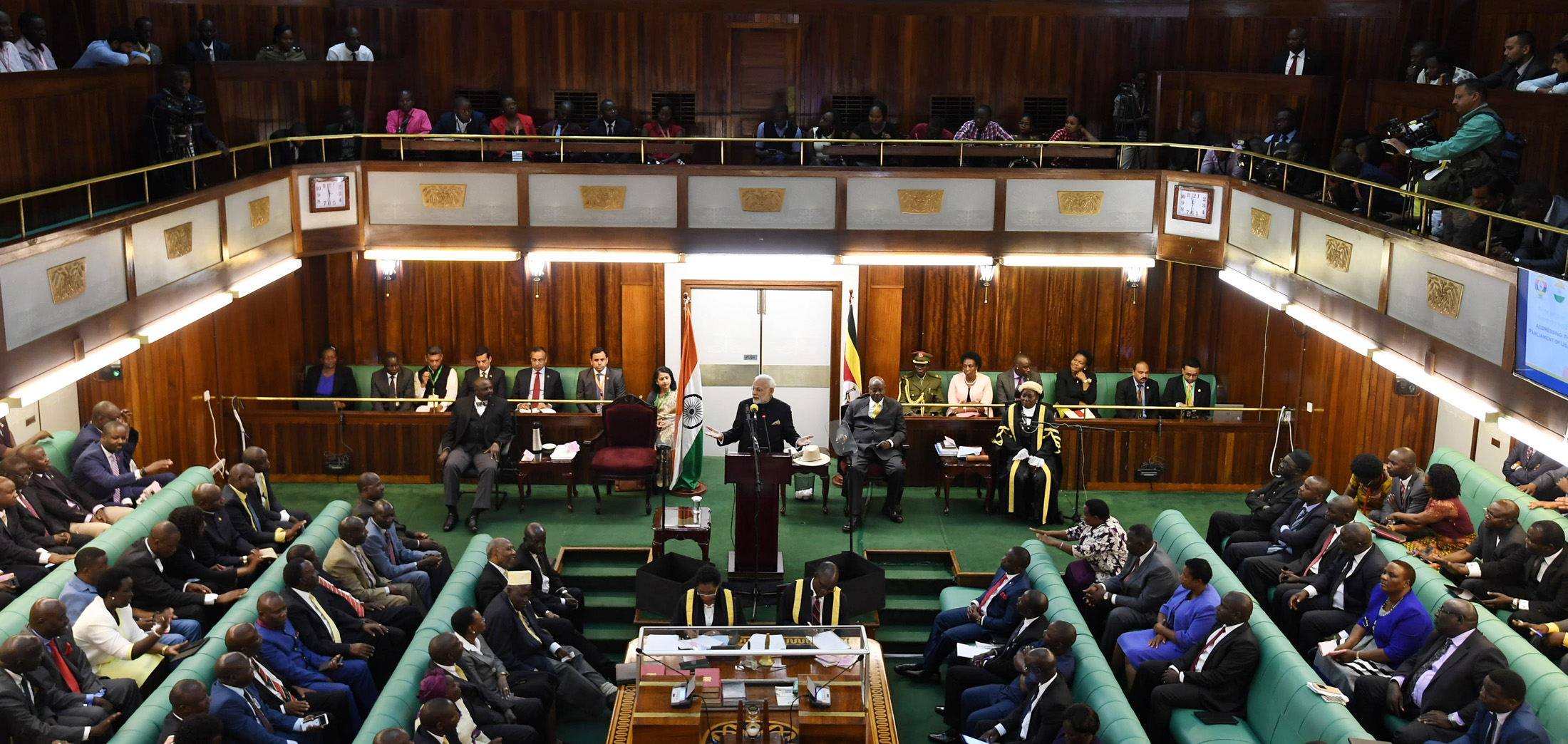
- Parliament Avenue, Kampala

Website
- www.parliament.go.ug

Constitution
- Constitution of Uganda

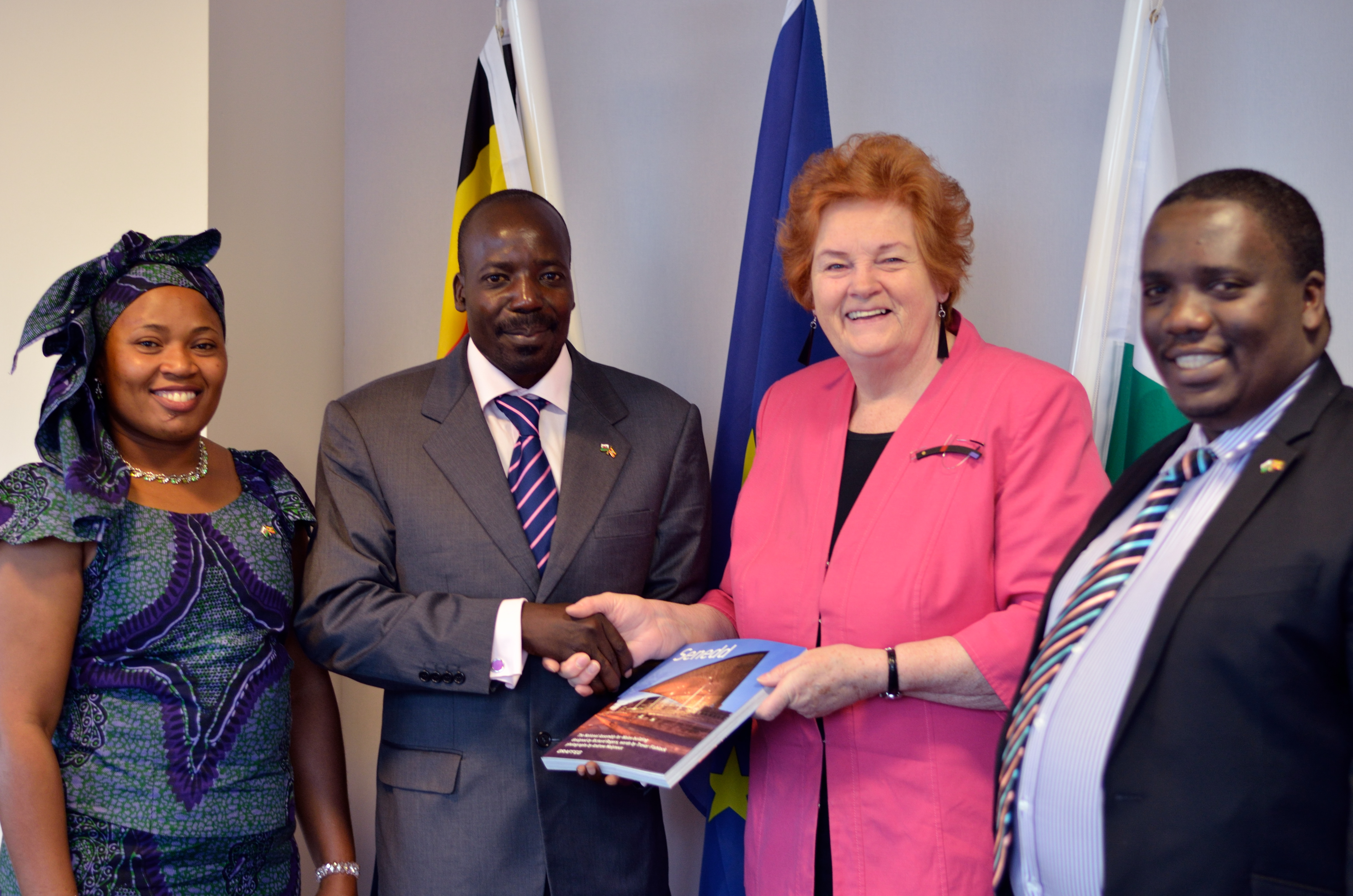
The Presiding Officer of the Senedd greets delegates from the Ugandan Parliament; 2012

The Parliament of Uganda is the unicameral legislature of the Republic of Uganda. One of its primary functions is to pass laws that support effective governance in the country. Government ministers are required to answer to the people's representatives on the floor of the house and may be appointed from amongst its members.

Through the various parliamentary committees, parliament scrutinises government programmes, particularly as outlined in the State of the Nation address by the president. Fiscal matters, such as taxation and loans, require parliamentary approval after appropriate debate. Parliament also holds the authority to confirm certain presidential nominations and, through a motion of censure, may compel a Minister to resign.

== Composition ==
The 11th Parliament (2021–2026) has a total of 557 seats, including 353 representatives elected using first-past-the-post voting in single winner constituencies. Using the same method, 146 seats reserved for women are filled, with one seat per district. Finally, 30 seats are indirectly filled via special electoral colleges: 10 by the army, 5 by youths, 5 by elders, 5 by unions, 5 by people with disabilities and 28 Ex Officio Members. In each of these groups, at least one woman must be elected (at least two for the army group).

In 2016, it was composed of 288 constituency representatives, 121 district woman representatives, ten Uganda People's Defence Force representatives, five representatives of the youth, five representatives of persons with disabilities, five representatives of workers, and seventeen ex officio members.

== History ==
The Ugandan parliament was established in 1962, soon after the country's independence.

=== First Parliament of Uganda (1956–1962) ===
Uganda Legislative Council (LEGCO) is considered to be the first Parliament of Uganda.

The Legislative Council (LEGCO) of Uganda was created in 1920, replacing governance by the Commissioner’s decrees. At its inception, the Council was composed entirely of European members under the leadership of Governor Sir Robert Coryndon. An Asian representative was first admitted in 1926, and on 4 December 1945, the first African members, Michael Ernest Kawalya Kaggwa (the Katikkiro of Buganda), Petero Nyangabyaki (the Katikkiro of Bunyoro), and Yekonia Zirabamuzaale, were sworn in to the LEGCO to represent Buganda, Western and Eastern Provinces.

In the 1950s, the structure and procedures of LEGCO underwent notable reforms. A ministerial system was introduced in 1956, and Sir John Bowes Griffin was appointed as the first Speaker in January 1958 for LEGCO. Uganda’s first direct general elections, held in March 1961, resulted in an African majority within the Council. LEGCO remained in place until 1 March 1962, when self government was established and it was replaced by the National Assembly.

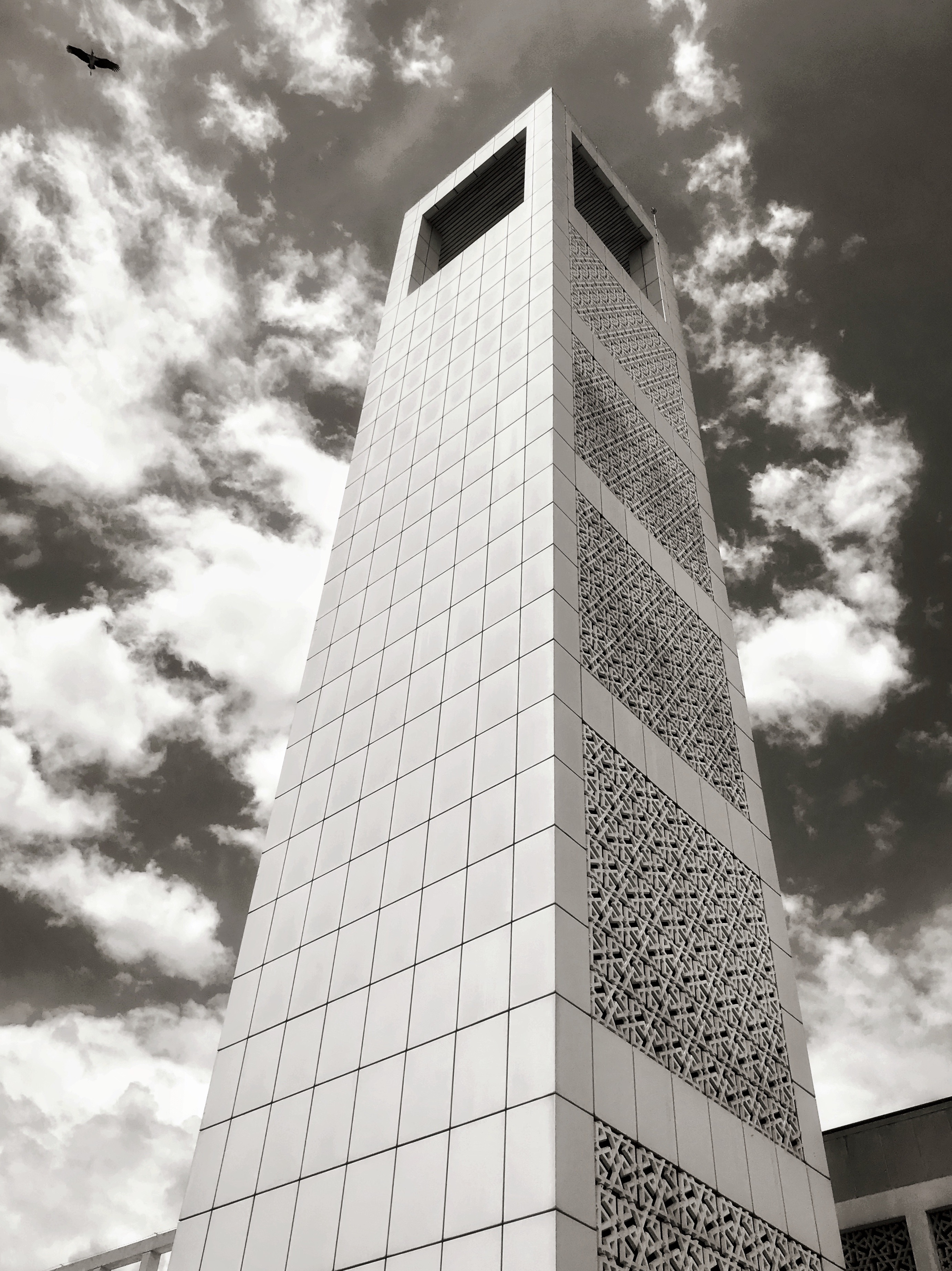
The tower that separates the east from the north wing buildings at the Uganda Parliament. this tower together with the parliament was built by the British colonial government in the late 1950s as a gift to Uganda just before it attained its independence.

=== Second Parliament (1962–1979) ===
During this period, Prime Minister Milton Obote abrogated the constitution and declared himself President of Uganda in 1966. This parliament also witnessed the abolition of Uganda's traditional kingdoms and the declaration of Uganda as a republic. This decision was impacted by the legal counsel of Member of Parliament A. G. Mehta following the Ugandan Constitutional Conference in which Uganda became an independent nation. The speaker during the Second Parliament was Narendra M. Patel, a Ugandan of Indian descent. This parliament ended when Idi Amin overthrew Milton Obote's government in January 1971.

=== Third Parliament (1979–1980) ===
Following the overthrow of Idi Amin in April 1979, a new legislative body known as the National Consultative Council (NRC) was established and it served as the interim parliament. With an initial membership of 30that was elected in Moshi, Tanzania, the membership was later increased to 120. This was the Third Parliament and was chaired by Edward Rugumayo. This legislative body continued to function until the general elections of December 1980.

=== Fourth Parliament (1980–1985) ===
This period marked the return to power of Milton Obote and the Uganda People's Congress (UPC), following the disputed national elections of 1980. The speaker of the Fourth Parliament was Francis Butagira, a Harvard-trained lawyer. the Fourth Parliament ended when General Basilio Olara Okello overthrew Obote and the UPC government in 1985.

=== Fifth Parliament (1986–1996) ===
Known as the National Resistance Council (NRC), the Fifth Parliament was established following the end of the Ugandan Bush War (1980–1986). Starting with 38 historical members of the National Resistance Movement and National Resistance Army, the legislative body was gradually expanded to include representatives from around the country. The speaker during the Fifth Parliament was Yoweri Museveni, who also concurrently served as the President of Uganda.

=== Sixth Parliament (1996–2001) ===
The Sixth Parliament was constituted during one-party rule (NRM). James Wapakhabulo served as speaker from 1996 until 1998. From 1998 until 2001, Francis Ayume, a member of Parliament from Koboko District, served as speaker.

=== Seventh Parliament (2001–2006) ===
The Seventh Parliament was presided over as Speaker by Edward Ssekandi. The most controversial legislation passed during this period was the amendment of the constitution to remove presidential term limits.

=== Eighth Parliament (2006–2011) ===
This was a continuation of the Seventh Parliament, with Edward Ssekandi as speaker and Rebecca Kadaga as deputy speaker.

Party	Constituency			Women			Seats	
Party	Votes	%	Seats	Votes	%	Seats	Appointed	Total
National Resistance Movement			141			58	14	213
Forum for Democratic Change			27			10	0	37
Uganda People's Congress			9			0	0	9
Democratic Party			8			0	0	8
Conservative Party			1			0	0	1
Justice Forum			1			0	0	1
Independents			28			11	1	40
Uganda People's Defence Force							10	10
Total			215			79	25	319
Registered voters/turnout	10,450,788	68		10,450,788	–			
Source: Electoral Commission, IPU

=== Ninth Parliament (2011–2016) ===
The Ninth Parliament was presided over by Rebecca Kadaga as speaker, and Jacob Oulanyah as deputy speaker.

Party	Constituency			Women			Seats		
Party	Votes	%	Seats	Votes	%	Seats	Appointed	Total	+/–
National Resistance Movement	3,883,209	49.22	164	3,803,608	51.56	86	13	263	+50
Forum for Democratic Change	1,070,109	13.56	23	1,242,218	16.84	11	0	34	–3
Democratic Party	476,415	6.04	11	325,660	4.41	1	0	12	+4
Uganda People's Congress	265,568	3.37	7	237,477	3.22	3	0	10	+1
Justice Forum	50,120	0.64	1	10,796	0.15	0	0	1	0
Conservative Party	48,276	0.61	1	1,084	0.01	0	0	1	0
Uganda Federal Alliance	23,585	0.30	0	34,346	0.47	0	0	0	New
People's Progressive Party	15,692	0.20	0	26,320	0.36	0	0	0	New
Forum for Integrity in Leadership	8,871	0.11	0				0	0	New
Social Democratic Party	5,664	0.07	0				0	0	New
Popular People's Democracy	3,399	0.04	0				0	0	New
People's Development Party	2,526	0.03	0	1,853	0.03	0	0	0	New
Liberal Democratic Transparency	2,035	0.03	0	3,997	0.05	0	0	0	New
Green Partisan Party	297	0.00	0				0	0	New
Uganda Economic Party	207	0.00	0				0	0	New
Independents	2,034,250	25.78	30	1,689,389	22.90	11	2	43	+3
Uganda People's Defence Force							10	10	0
Vacant			1				–	1	–
Total	7,890,223	100.00	238	7,376,748	100.00	112	25	375	+56
Source: Electoral Commission, Election Passport

=== Tenth Parliament (2016–2021) ===
In the Tenth Parliament, Rebecca Kadaga and Jacob Oulanyah remained in their posts as speaker and deputy speaker respectively.

Party	Constituency			Women			Seats		
Party	Votes	%	Seats	Votes	%	Seats	Appointed	Total	+/–
National Resistance Movement	3,945,000	48.88	199	3,566,617	48.95	84	10	293	+30
Forum for Democratic Change	1,027,648	12.73	29	929,860	12.76	7	0	36	+2
Democratic Party	349,962	4.34	13	246,284	3.38	2	0	15	+3
Uganda People's Congress	172,781	2.14	4	236,164	3.24	2	0	6	–4
Justice Forum	20,089	0.25	0	16,741	0.23	0	0	0	–1
Ugandan Federal Alliance	18,146	0.22	0				0	0	New
Conservative Party	10,792	0.13	0	2,902	0.04	0	0	0	–1
Social Democratic Party	5,972	0.07	0				0	0	New
Republican Women and Youth Party	2,311	0.03	0	8,502	0.12	0	0	0	New
People's Progressive Party	2,185	0.03	0	16,720	0.23	0	0	0	New
Uganda Patriotic Movement	470	0.01	0				0	0	New
Activist Party	175	0.00	0				0	0	New
Independents	2,515,163	31.16	44	2,261,897	31.05	17	5	66	+23
Uganda People's Defence Force							10	10	0
Total	8,070,694	100.00	289	7,285,687	100.00	112	25	426	+51
Registered voters/turnout	15,277,198	–		15,277,198	–				
Source: Electoral Commission, Electoral Commission

==== 2017 Parliament fight ====
On September 27, 2017, a fight ensued during a legislative session of the Ugandan parliament. The legislation in discussion at the time was to remove the presidential age limit of 75 from the Ugandan constitution. Following accusations from the parliamentary speaker against certain lawmakers in the chamber of disorderly conduct, a full-fledged fight broke out in which chairs were thrown, microphone stands used as clubs, and eventual removal of some members by plain clothes security officers.

=== Eleventh Parliament (2021–2026) ===
At the beginning of the 11th Parliament in May 2021, Jacob Oulanyah was elected Speaker of Parliament, with Anita Among serving as Deputy Speaker. Oulanyah died in March 2022 while in office. Following his death, Among was elected Speaker of Parliament on 25 March 2022. On the same day, Thomas Tayebwa was voted as the new Deputy Speaker of the Parliament of Uganda.

Party	Constituency			Women			Special Interests Groups			Total seats	+/–
Party	Votes	%	Seats	Votes	%	Seats	Votes	%	Seats	Total seats	+/–
National Resistance Movement	4,158,934	41.60	218	4,532,814	44.81	101	9,132	53.59	17	336	+43
National Unity Platform	1,347,929	13.48	43	1,607,425	15.89	14	110	0.65	0	57	New
Forum for Democratic Change	729,247	7.29	24	674,154	6.66	8	60	0.35	0	32	–4
Democratic Party	245,248	2.45	8	181,364	1.79	1	1	0.01	0	9	–6
Uganda People's Congress	180,313	1.80	7	229,884	2.27	2				9	+3
Alliance for National Transformation	72,018	0.72	0	82,318	0.81	0	13	0.08	0	0	New
Justice Forum	24,843	0.25	1	22,625	0.22	0				1	+1
People's Progressive Party	10,076	0.10	1							1	+1
Uganda Economic Party	6,199	0.06	0							0	New
Ecological Party of Uganda	4,287	0.04	0							0	New
Conservative Party	1,071	0.01	0							0	0
Social Democratic Party	719	0.01	0							0	0
Forum for Integrity in Leadership	122	0.00	0							0	New
Congress Service Volunteers Organisation	68	0.00	0							0	New
Uganda People's Defence Force							3,754	22.03	10	10	0
Independents	3,217,480	32.18	51	2,785,676	27.54	20	3,972	23.31	3	74	+8
Total	9,998,554	100.00	353	10,116,260	100.00	146	17,042	100.00	30	529	+103
Source: Electoral Commission

=== Twelfth Parliament (2026–present) ===
At the beginning of the 12th Parliament in May 2026, Jacob Marksons Oboth was elected Speaker of Parliament, with Thomas Tayebwa serving as Deputy Speaker. Oboth was elected Speaker on 25 May 2026 at the Kololo Ceremonial Grounds, receiving 441 votes against Paul Mwiru, who received 60 votes, and Norbert Mao, who received 15 votes. On the same day, Tayebwa was elected Deputy Speaker with 457 votes, defeating Asinansi Nyakato, who received 45 votes, and Sarah Aguti, who received 14 votes. Tayebwa had previously served as Deputy Speaker during the 11th Parliament.

Many prominent MPs were unseated including Mathias Mpuuga, Ibrahim Ssemujju Nganda, Abed Bwanika and Asuman Basalirwa.

Party	Constituency			Women			Special Interests Groups			Total seats	+/–
Party	Votes	%	Seats	Votes	%	Seats	Votes	%	Seats	Total seats	+/–
National Resistance Movement	5,000,564	47.98	249	5,015,892	49.84	109	7,740	44.13	14	372	+36
National Unity Platform	1,349,645	12.95	39	1,550,819	15.41	10	31	0.18	0	49	–8
Uganda People's Congress	250,864	2.41	8	301,721	3.00	4	343	1.96	0	12	+3
Forum for Democratic Change	245,988	2.36	6	255,848	2.54	3	21	0.12	0	9	–23
People's Front for Freedom	131,055	1.26	0	70,832	0.70	2				2	New
Democratic Party	106,583	1.02	6	18,216	0.18	0	11	0.06	0	6	–3
Democratic Front	64,501	0.62	0	39,220	0.39	0				0	New
Alliance for National Transformation	37,197	0.36	1	1,434	0.01	0	1	0.01	0	1	+1
People's Progressive Party	14,482	0.14	0							0	–1
Justice Forum	13,048	0.13	0	3,374	0.03	0	3	0.02	0	0	–1
Uganda Patriotic Movement	5,769	0.06	0							0	New
National Peasants' Party	4,357	0.04	0							0	New
Common Man's Party	2,178	0.02	0	2,242	0.02	0				0	New
Ecological Party of Uganda	1,874	0.02	0							0	0
Conservative Party	595	0.01	0							0	0
National Economic Empowerment Dialogue	504	0.00	0	1,720	0.02	0				0	New
Society for Peace and Development	186	0.00	0							0	New
Congress Service Volunteers Organisation				155	0.00	0				0	0
Uganda People's Defence Force							4,541	25.89	10	10	0
Independent	3,192,557	30.63	44	2,803,502	27.85	18	4,849	27.65	6	68	–6
Total	10,421,947	100.00	353	10,064,975	100.00	146	17,540	100.00	30	529	0
Source: Electoral Commission

== Ugandan legislation ==
Examples of Uganda's legislation include:

- The amendment of the constitution to remove presidential term limits.
- The Employment Act, 2006, Act 6 of 2006
- The Anti-Homosexuality Act, 2014
- The Anti-Homosexuality Act, 2023

The Uganda Legal Information Institute (ULII) publishes the laws of Uganda, allowing for free online access.

== See also ==
- List of legislatures by country
- List of speakers of the Parliament of Uganda
- Apollo Ofwono
- Thomas Tayebwa
- Jacob Oboth-Oboth
- Joel Ssenyonyi
- Politics of Uganda

== Notes ==
1. Of the 499 seats, 353 are elected by constituency, while 146 seats reserved for women are elected by district.
2. Out of the 30 seats, 10 are reserved for the Uganda People's Defence Force, while 5 seats each are allocated to the youth, the elderly, workers, and citizens with disabilities.
