= 1960 New Year Honours =

British royal recognitions

The New Year Honours 1960 were appointments in many of the Commonwealth realms of Queen Elizabeth II to various orders and honours to reward and highlight good works by citizens of those countries. They were announced in supplements to the London Gazette of 29 December 1959 to celebrate the year passed and mark the beginning of 1960.

At this time honours for Australians were awarded both in the United Kingdom honours, on the advice of the premiers of Australian states, and also in a separate Australia honours list.

The recipients of honours are displayed here as they were styled before their new honour, and arranged by honour, with classes (Knight, Knight Grand Cross, etc.) and then divisions (Military, Civil, etc.) as appropriate.

== United Kingdom and Commonwealth ==
=== Viscount ===
- The Right Honourable John Durival, Baron Rochdale, OBE, TD, DL, Chairman, Cotton Board since 1957. President, National Union of Manufacturers, 1953–1956.

=== Baron ===
- The Honourable Sir Evelyn Baring, GCMG, KCVO, lately Governor and Commander-in-Chief, Kenya, and lately Chairman, East Africa High Commission.
- Sir George Horatio Nelson, Bt., Chairman, English Electric Co. Ltd.

=== Life Baron ===
- Sir Alfred Charles Bossom, Bt., Member of Parliament for Maidstone, 1931–1959. For political and public services.
- The Right Honourable Edward Hugh John Neale Dalton, Member of Parliament for Peckham, 1924–1929 and for Bishop Auckland, 1929–1931 and 1935–1959. Parliamentary Under-Secretary of State for Foreign Affairs, 1929–1931; Minister of Economic Warfare, 1940–1942; President of the Board of Trade, 1942–1945; Chancellor of the Exchequer, 1945–1947; Chancellor of the Duchy of Lancaster, 1948–1950; Minister of Town and Country Planning, 1950–1951; Minister of Local Government and Planning, 1951. For political and public services.

=== Privy Councillor ===
- David Vivian Penrose, Baron Brecon, Minister of State for Welsh Affairs since 1957.
- John Dennis Profumo, OBE, MP, Member of Parliament for Kettering, 1940–1945 and for Stratford-on-Avon since 1950. Parliamentary Secretary, Ministry of Civil Aviation, 1952–1953; Joint Parliamentary Secretary, Ministry of Transport and Civil Aviation, 1953–1957; Under-Secretary of State for the Colonies, 1957–1958; Joint Under-Secretary of State for Foreign Affairs, December 1958–January 1959; Minister of State for Foreign Affairs since January 1959.
- Sir Roland Welensky, KCMG, Prime Minister of the Federation of Rhodesia and Nyasaland.

=== Baronet ===
- Donald Kaberry, TD, MP, Member of Parliament for North-West Leeds since 1950. Assistant Government Whip, 1952–1955; Parliamentary Secretary, Board of Trade, 1955. Joint Vice-chairman, Conservative Party Organisation since 1955. For political and public services.
- John Kenyon Vaughan-Morgan, MP, Member of Parliament for Reigate since 1950. Parliamentary Secretary, Ministry of Health, 1957; Minister of State, Board of Trade, 1957–1959. For political and public services.
- George Richard Hodges Nugent, MP, Member of Parliament for Guildford since 1950. Parliamentary Secretary, Ministry of Agriculture, Fisheries and Food, 1951–1957; Joint Parliamentary Secretary, Ministry of Transport and Civil Aviation, 1957–1959. For political and public services.
- Sir James Paterson Ross, KCVO, MS, PRCS, President of the Royal College of Surgeons of England.
- Samuel Storey, MP, Member of Parliament for Sunderland, 1931–1945 and for Stretford since 1950. For political and public services.

=== Knight Bachelor ===
- Harold Walter Bailey, Professor of Sanskrit, University of Cambridge.
- Albert Frederick Bradbeer, JP, Alderman, Birmingham City Council.
- Richard Frank Burnand, CBE, Senior Master, Queen's Bench Division, and Queen's Remembrancer, Supreme Court of Judicature.
- Professor Andrew Moynihan Claye, MD, FRCS, President, Royal College of Obstetricians and Gynaecologists.
- Robert Annesley Wilkinson Dent, CB, lately Clerk of Public Bills, House of Commons.
- Derrick Melville Dunlop, MD, FRCP, Professor of Therapeutics and Clinical Medicine, University of Edinburgh.
- Lieutenant-Colonel Timothy Fetherston-Haugh, OBE, TD, DL. For political and public services in the North of England.
- Myer Galpern, JP, MP, Lord Provost of Glasgow.
- William Henry Glanville, CB, CBE, Director, Road Research Laboratory, Department of Scientific and Industrial Research.
- Colonel Douglas Glover, TD, MP, Member of Parliament for Ormskirk since 1953. For political and public services in North-West England.
- John Hammond, CBE, Agricultural Scientist.
- Thomas Hargreaves. For political and public services in Lancashire.
- Thomas Winlack Harley, MBE, MC. For political and public services in Lancashire and Cheshire.
- Roger Henry Hollis, CB, OBE, attached War Office.
- Roger Antony Hornby. For political and public services in London.
- Edmund McNeill Cooper-Key, MP, Member of Parliament for Hastings since 1945. For political and public services.
- Joseph Latham, CBE. Deputy Chairman, National Coal Board.
- David Theharne Llewellyn, Member of Parliament for Cardiff, North, 1950–1959. Under Secretary of State for the Home Department, 1951–1952. For political and public services.
- Joseph Flawith Lockwood, Chairman, Electric & Musical Industries Ltd.
- Harrie Stewart Wilson Massey, Quain Professor of Physics, University College, London.
- Ronald Peter Morison, QC. For political and public services.
- Duncan Morris Oppenheim, Chairman, British American Tobacco Co. Ltd.
- Karl Theodore Parker, CBE, Keeper of the Ashmolean Museum, University of Oxford.
- Alderman Ralph Edgar Perring, lately Sheriff of the City of London.
- Major-General Geoffrey Taunton Raikes, CB, DSO, lately HM Lieutenant of the County of Brecknock.
- Leon Edgar Stephens, CBE, DL, Clerk of the Warwickshire County Council.
- John Barton Townley, For political and public services in Preston.
- Charles Frederick Trustam, Chief General Manager, Royal Insurance Co. Ltd.
- Arthur Bertram Waring, DL, Chairman and Managing Director, Joseph Lucas (Industries) Ltd.
- David Lumsden Webster, General Administrator, Royal Opera House, Covent Garden.
- Gwilym Ffrangcon Williams, CBE, Vice-chairman, National Savings Committee.

State of Victoria

- William Wallace Stewart Johnston, CBE, DSO, MC, ED, MD, of the State of Victoria; in recognition of his work for Post-Graduate Education in Medicine.

State of Queensland

- William Labatt Payne, CMG, OBE, President of the Land Court, State of Queensland.

State of South Australia

- The Honourable Charles Arthur Hillas Lempriere Abbott, a Judge of the Supreme Court, State of South Australia.
- The Honourable Cecil Stephen Hincks, Minister of Lands, Minister of Repatriation, and Minister of Irrigation, State of South Australia.

State of Western Australia

- Richard Greenslade Moore, OBE, Mayor of Kalgoorlie, State of Western Australia, since 1937.

Southern Rhodesia

- Ralph John Morton, CMG, OBE, MC, formerly a Judge of the High Court of Southern Rhodesia.

Commonwealth Relations

- John Douglas Keith Brown, Managing Director of Messrs. Jardine Henderson Ltd. For services to the United Kingdom community in India.
- Hamilton Macaulay, CBE, a Company Director, of Chittagong, East Pakistan. For services to United Kingdom interests in Pakistan.

Overseas Territories

- Alastair Granville Forbes, Vice-President, Eastern African Court of Appeal.
- Charles Herbert Hartwell, CMG, Chief Secretary, Uganda.
- Anthony Joseph Mamo, OBE, Chief Justice and President of the Court of Appeal, Malta.
- Cecil Rex Niven, CMG, MC, Commissioner for Special Duties, Northern Region, Nigeria.
- Colin Raeburn, CBE. For public services in Cyprus.
- Thomas Murray Shankland, CMG, Chairman of the London Board of the Public Service Commission, Western Region, Nigeria.
- George Evelyn Sinclair, CMG, OBE, Deputy Governor, Cyprus.
- Alexander Moody Stuart, OBE, MC. For public services in the Leeward Islands.

=== Order of the Bath ===
==== Knight Grand Cross of the Order of the Bath (GCB) ====
Military Division

- General Sir Geoffrey Kemp Bourne, KCB, KBE, CMG, ADC (Gen.), (23643), Colonel Commandant, Royal Regiment of Artillery.
- Air Chief Marshal Sir Harry Broadhurst, KCB, KBE, DSO, DFC, AFC, Royal Air Force.

Civil Division

- Sir Roger Mellor Makins, GCMG, KCB, lately Joint Permanent Secretary, HM Treasury.

==== Knight Commander of the Order of the Bath (KCB) ====
Military Division

- Vice-Admiral John David Luce, CB, DSO, OBE.
- Vice-Admiral Douglas Eric Holland-Martin, CB, DSO, DSC.
- Lieutenant-General Charles Phibbs Jones, CB, CBE, MC, (34845), late Corps of Royal Engineers.
- Air Marshal Hector Douglas McGregor, CB, CBE, DSO, Royal Air Force.
- Acting Air Marshal Wallace Hart Kyle, CB, CBE, DSO, DFC, Royal Air Force.

Civil Division

- Ludovic James Dunnett, CB, CMG, Permanent Secretary, Ministry of Transport.

==== Companion of the Order of the Bath (CB) ====
Military Division

Royal Navy

- Surgeon Rear-Admiral Douglas Murdo Beaton, OBE, QHP, LRCP&S.
- Rear-Admiral Dennis Royle Farquharson Cambell, DSC.
- Rear-Admiral Desmond Parry Dreyer, CBE, DSC.
- Surgeon Rear-Admiral (D) Charles Joseph Finnigan, QHDS, LDS.
- Rear-Admiral Peter William Gretton, DSO, OBE, DSC.
- Rear-Admiral Walter Frederick Boyt Lane, DSC.
- Rear-Admiral Hector Charles Donald Maclean, DSC.
- Rear-Admiral Ronald Wilson Paffard, CBE.
- Rear-Admiral Robert Francis Storrs.
- Rear-Admiral John Yelverton Thompson.

Army

- Major-General Stuart Hedley Molesworth Battye (37038), late Corps of Royal Engineers.
- Major-General Gerald Charles Hopkinson, DSO, OBE, MC, (47586), late Royal Armoured Corps.
- Major-General John Francis Metcalfe, CBE, (41781), late Infantry; Colonel, The Queens Royal Surrey Regiment.
- Major-General Henry Quinlan, QHDS, BDS, (37629), late Royal Army Dental Corps.
- Major-General Frank McLean Richardson, DSO, OBE, QHS, MD, (36784), late Royal Army Medical Corps.
- Major-General Dennis Edmund Blacquiere Talbot, CBE, DSO, MC, (40742), late Infantry; Colonel, The Queen's Own Royal West Kent Regiment.
- Major-General George Arthur Thomas, CBE, (36892), late Royal Regiment of Artillery.
- Major-General Thomas Frederick Mackie Woods, OBE, QHP, MD, MRCP(I), (38600), late Royal Army Medical Corps.

Royal Air Force

- Acting Air Marshal Samuel Charles Elworthy, CBE, DSO, MVO, DFC, AFC.
- Air Vice-Marshal Edouard Michael Fitzfrederick Grundy, OBE.
- Acting Air Vice-Marshal Robert William Lowry Glenn, CBE.
- Air Commodore Thomas Norman Coslett, OBE.
- Air Commodore Edward Mortlock Donaldson, CBE, DSO, AFC.
- Air Commodore Edward Gordon Jones, CBE, DSO, DFC.
- Acting Air Commodore Richard Templeton Gething, OBE, AFC.
- Acting Air Commodore Richard Ian Jones, AFC.

Civil Division

- Colonel Lindsay William Saul Blackmore, TD, DL, Chairman, Territorial and Auxiliary Forces Association, Hampshire and the Isle of Wight.
- Richard Charles Bryant, Under-Secretary, Board of Trade.
- Alec Fulton Charles Clark, Under-Secretary, Scottish Home Department.
- Charles Sigmund Davis, Legal Adviser and Solicitor, Ministry of Agriculture, Fisheries and Food.
- Laurence George Gale, OBE, Director-General of Armament Production, War Office.
- Ernest John Meadon, Under-Secretary and Accountant-General, Ministry of Power.
- Michael Israel Michaels, Under-Secretary, Office of the Minister for Science.
- Roger Nathaniel Quirk, Under-Secretary, Office of the Minister of Science.
- James Henderson Waddell, Under-Secretary, Ministry of Housing and Local Government.
- Robert Hendry Weir, Director-General of Engine Research and Development, Ministry of Aviation.
- Hector Ford Willis, Chief of the Royal Naval Scientific Service.
- Frank Wood, Assistant Under-Secretary of State, Air Ministry.

Additional Companion

- Commander Richard Colville, CVO, DSC, Royal Navy (Retired), Press Secretary to The Queen.

=== Order of Saint Michael and Saint George ===
==== Knight Grand Cross of the Order of St Michael and St George (GCMG) ====
- Sir Christopher Eden Steel, KCMG, MVO, Her Majesty's Ambassador Extraordinary and Plenipotentiary in Bonn.

==== Knight Commander of the Order of St Michael and St George (KCMG) ====
- Sir Philip Robert Morris, CBE, lately Chairman of the Commonwealth Education Conference. Vice-chancellor of the University of Bristol.
- Sir Dick Goldsmith White, KBE. For official services.
- The Honourable Humphrey Vicary Gibbs, OBE, Governor of Southern Rhodesia.
- Sir John Evelyn Leslie Wrench, CMG. For Commonwealth Services.
- Geoffrey Walter Nye, CMG, OBE, Adviser on Agriculture to the Secretary of State for the Colonies.
- Richard Hugh Sedley Allen, CMG, Her Majesty's Ambassador Extraordinary and Plenipotentiary in Rangoon.
- Ponsonby Moore Crosthwaite, CMG, Her Majesty's Ambassador Extraordinary and Plenipotentiary in Beirut.

==== Companion of the Order of St Michael and St George (CMG) ====
- Denzil Arnold Bryan, OBE, Senior United Kingdom Trade Commissioner in Pakistan.
- Philip Marion Kirby Green, attached War Office.
- Thomas Harvatt, Secretary, Council of Legal Education, and Deputy Director, Inns of Court School of Law.
- Ralph Elliott Stedman, Under-Secretary, Ministry of Agriculture, Fisheries and Food.
- Frank Brewer, OBE, formerly Secretary for Defence, Federation of Malaya.
- The Honourable Rutherford Campbell Guthrie. For political and public services in the State of Victoria.
- Allan Walton Knight, Chief Commissioner of the Hydro-Electric Commission, State of Tasmania.
- Franklin James Morgan, of Clayfield, State of Queensland. For public services.
- Stanley Ernest Morris, Secretary for Native Affairs and Chief Native Commissioner, Southern Rhodesia.
- Charles Michael Walker, an Assistant Under-Secretary of State in the Commonwealth Relations Office.
- Philip Carrel, OBE, Chief Secretary, Somaliland Protectorate.
- Diarmaid William Conroy, OBE, TD, QC, Permanent Secretary, Ministry of Legal Affairs, and Solicitor-General, Kenya.
- Joseph Leslie Cundall, QC, Attorney-General, Jamaica.
- Sir George Edwin Douglas Duntze, Bt., Provincial Commissioner, Uganda.
- Chief Festus Samuel Okotie-Eboh, Federal Minister of Finance, Federation of Nigeria.
- Alexander Falconer Giles, MBE, Administrator, St. Vincent, Windward Islands.
- Cosmo Dugal Patrick Thomas Haskard, MBE, Provincial Commissioner, Nyasaland.
- Sir James Henry, Bt., MC, Attorney-General, Cyprus.
- Edward Walter Moyle Magor, OBE, Assistant Chief Secretary, Kenya.
- Charles Watt Michie, OBE, Permanent Secretary, Ministry of Agriculture, Northern Region, Nigeria.
- Edward Walter Russell, Director, East African Agriculture and Forestry Research Organization, East African High Commission.
- Alan Roe Snelus, Deputy Chief Secretary, Sarawak.
- John Daniel Stringer, Senior Commissioner, Zanzibar.
- Andrew Urquhart, MBE, Deputy Governor, Eastern Region, Nigeria.
- Victor George Vella, CVO, OBE, ED, Commissioner-General for Malta in London.
- Noel Duncan Watson, Assistant Secretary, Colonial Office.
- Bertram John Weston, Senior Commissioner, Cyprus.
- John Albert Briance, Counsellor, Her Majesty's Embassy, Washington.
- Denis Arthur Greenhill, OBE, lately Foreign Office.
- The Honourable Henry Arthur Alers Hankey, CVO, Foreign Office.
- Stephen Alexander Lockhart, OBE, Her Majesty's Consul-General, Leopoldville.
- Douglas John Brett Robey, Her Majesty's Consul-General, Cleveland.
- Thomas Edward Rogers, MBE, Counsellor (Economic/Commercial), Her Majesty's Embassy, Belgrade.
- Colonel (Temporary Brigadier) Eugene Vincent Strickland, DSO, OBE, MM, lately Joint Head, British Joint Services Mission, Jordan.
- Douglas Taylor, lately Counsellor (Labour), Her Majesty's Embassy, Rome.
- Peter Allix Wilkinson, DSO, OBE, Counsellor, Her Majesty's Embassy, Bonn.

=== Royal Victorian Order ===
==== Knight Commander of the Royal Victorian Order (KCVO) ====
- Ivan Whiteside Magill, CVO, MB, BCh.

==== Commander of the Royal Victorian Order (CVO) ====
- Lieutenant-Colonel The Most Honourable James Arthur Norman, The Marquess of Ormonde, MC.
- James Pope-Hennessy.

==== Member of the Royal Victorian Order (MVO) ====
At this time the two lowest classes of the Royal Victorian Order were "Member (fourth class)" and "Member (fifth class)", both with post-nominal letters MVO. "Member (fourth class)" was renamed "Lieutenant" (LVO) from the 1985 New Year Honours onwards.

Fourth Class

- Agnes Barbara Holland.
- Godfrey Walker Talbot, OBE.
- Commander Philip Alexander Watson, Royal Navy.

Fifth Class

- Dorothy Flossie Bird.
- Major David Colville, MBE, The King's Shropshire Light Infantry.
- Frank Edward Hart.
- John William Lewis.
- Superintendent Reginald Baden Mitchell.
- Alfred Joseph Quirk.
- Engineer Lieutenant Peter Henry Robinson, Royal Navy.
- Elizabeth Anne Stevenson.

=== Order of the British Empire ===
==== Knight Grand Cross of the Order of the British Empire (GBE) ====
Military Division

- Admiral Sir Gerald Vaughan Gladstone, KCB.

Civil Division

- Lieutenant-General Sir (Edward) Ian Claud Jacob, KBE, CB, Director-General, British Broadcasting Corporation.
- Sir William Ivo Mallet, KCMG, Her Majesty's Ambassador Extraordinary and Plenipotentiary in Madrid.

==== Dame Commander of the Order of the British Empire (DBE) ====
Civil Division

- Barbara Muriel Brooke, Joint Vice-chairman, Conservative Party Organisation since 1954. For political and public services.
- Alice Miriam Berry, OBE, of Clayfield, State of Queensland. For services to country women and their organisations.

==== Knight Commander of the Order of the British Empire (KBE) ====
Military Division

Royal Navy

- Vice-Admiral William Kaye Edden, CB, OBE.
- Instructor Rear-Admiral John Fleming, DSC.

Army

- Major-General William Gordon Roe, CB, CBE, (44171), late Royal Army Service Corps.
- Major-General Henry Haskins Clapham Sugden, CB, CBE, DSO, (27950), late Corps of Royal Engineers.
- Lieutenant-General Geoffrey Stuart Thompson, CB, DSO, MBE, (31611), late Royal Regiment of Artillery.

Royal Air Force

- Air Marshal Herbert Dorman Spreckley, CB, OBE.
- Air Vice-Marshal Geoffrey Luis Worthington, CB, CBE.

Civil Division

- The Right Honourable Nigel Ivan, Baron Forbes, Minister of State, Scottish Office, 1958–1959. For political and public services.
- Robert James Paterson Harvey, CB, Deputy Director-General, General Post Office.
- Brigadier Henry Walter Houldsworth, DSO, MC, TD, President, Territorial and Auxiliary Forces Association, County of Moray. HM Lieutenant of the County of Moray.
- Sir Ambrose James Sherwill, CBE, MC, Bailiff of Guernsey.
- Rear-Admiral Sir Matthew Sausse Slattery, CB, Chairman and Managing Director, Short Brothers & Harland, Ltd. Until recently, Special Adviser to the Prime Minister on the Transport of Middle East Oil.
- Geoffrey Warren Furlonge, CMG, OBE, lately Her Majesty's Ambassador Extraordinary and Plenipotentiary in Addis Ababa.
- Major Cyril Berkeley Ormerod, CBE, Director, Public Relations, British Information Services, New York.
- Lieutenant-General Sir Charles Henry Gairdner, KCMG, KCVO, CB, CBE, Governor of the State of Western Australia.
- Alhaji Abubakar Tafawa Balewa, CBE, Prime Minister of the Federation of Nigeria.
- James Robbie Farquharson, CBE, General Manager, East African Railways and Harbours Administration, East Africa High Commission.

==== Commander of the Order of the British Empire (CBE) ====
Military Division

Royal Navy

- Captain Nigel Hubert George Austen, DSO.
- Captain William Eric Brockman.
- Captain David Gordon Goodwin, DSC, ADC.
- Captain George Robert Barton Pattison.
- Commodore Jackson Whayman, DSC, RD, Royal Naval Reserve.
- Commander Peter White, MBE.
- Captain Edwin Arthur George Whittle.

Army

- Colonel Richard Malpas Allen, OBE, (47927), Royal Army Ordnance Corps.
- Brigadier Arthur Benjamin Barton, OBE, MC, (39843), late Infantry (now R.A.R.O.).
- Brigadier Francis Norton Wentworth Gore, OBE, (34434), late Royal Regiment of Artillery (now R.A.R.O.).
- Colonel Geoffrey Bridgman Grey, TD, (78349), Territorial Army.
- Brigadier (temporary) the Honourable Miles Francis Fitzalan-Howard, MC, (68110), late Foot Guards.
- Brigadier (temporary) Walter Morland Hutton, DSO, MC, (50984), late Royal Armoured Corps.
- Brigadier Reginald Charles Napier Jenney (34466), late Corps of Royal Engineers (now R.A.R.O.).
- Brigadier George Stuart Knox, OBE, (39178), late Royal Corps of Signals.
- Colonel Geoffrey William Harry Mew (49917), late Royal Army Educational Corps.
- The Reverend Kenneth Cyril Oliver, OBE, QHC, Chaplain to the Forces, First Class (91025), Royal Army Chaplains' Department.
- Brigadier Geoffrey Loveston Pethick, DSO, (38417), late Royal Regiment of Artillery.
- Brigadier (temporary) Julian Brindley Sandberg, OBE, (50990), late Royal Army Service Corps.
- Colonel Arthur Catchmay Tyler, MC, (56694), late Infantry.
- Colonel Thomas Wright, OBE, (34349), late Corps of Royal Engineers (now R.A.R.O.).
- Brigadier (temporary) Charles Arthur Zweigbergk, MC, (67498), Corps of Royal Electrical and Mechanical Engineers.
- Colonel John Godfrey Atkinson, OBE, (47509), late Infantry.
- Brigadier (temporary) Percy William Powlett Green, DSO, OBE, (53755), late Infantry.

Royal Air Force

- Air Commodore John Bernard Russell, DSO, OBE.
- Air Commodore William Percivale Stamm, QHS, MB, BS.
- Group Captain Henry John Cundall, DSO, DFC, AFC.
- Group Captain Walter Ronald Ford.
- Group Captain Donald Bryan Hatfield.
- Group Captain James Edgar Johnson, DSO, DFC.
- Group Captain Thomas William Kean, OBE, AFC.
- Group Captain Thomas King.
- Group Captain John Frederick Roberts, OBE.
- Group Captain Boyd Drayton Sellick, DSO, DFC.
- Group Captain Richard Douglas Stubbs, DFC.

Civil Division

- William Bridges-Adams. For services to the theatre.
- John Ainsworth, MBE, City Treasurer of Liverpool.
- Stanley Alstead, MD, FRCP, Regius Professor of Materia Medica and Therapeutics, University of Glasgow.
- John Miller Angell, Chairman, National Pig Progeny Testing Board.
- Arthur Ainslie Baker. For political and public services in Bristol.
- Harold Edwards Bannister, Assistant Secretary, Ministry of Agriculture, Fisheries and Food.
- Claude Bartlett, President, Confederation of Health Service Employees.
- Colonel Maurice William Batchelor, JP, Chairman, Sheffield Local Employment Committee.
- Harold Bedale, OBE, Town Clerk of Hornsey.
- Robert Beloe, lately Chief Education Officer, Surrey.
- John Betjeman, Poet and Author.
- Kenneth Wilkinson Black, TD, JP. For political and public services in Durham.
- Stanley Charles Bond, President, Traders Road Transport Association Ltd.
- The Honourable Derek Charles Moore-Brabazon. For political and public services in London.
- Captain Henry Brierley, OBE, MC, House Governor, The London Hospital.
- John Clark Ogilvie Burns, Chief Engineer, Department of Health for Scotland.
- Reginald Thomas Callender, Foreign Service Officer, Grade 1, Branch B, Foreign Office.
- Cornelius Cameron. For political and public services in Nottingham.
- George Harry Carruthers, Assistant Secretary, Board of Trade.
- Charles Edward Clarke, Principal Actuary, Government Actuary's Department.
- John Gilbert Cook, Treasury Valuer, Rating of Government Property Department.
- Douglas Dickson Cruickshank, ED, General Manager, Renfrew, Dalmuir and Dumbarton Works, Babcock & Wilcox Ltd.
- Leonard John Davies, Director of Research and Education, British Thomson-Houston Company. Ltd., Research Laboratory, Rugby.
- Thomas Davies, JP. For political and public services in Lancashire.
- John Law Denison, MBE, Music Director, Arts Council of Great Britain.
- William Timothy Donovan. For political and public services in St. Pancras.
- Elsa Dunbar, OBE. For services to the Women's Voluntary Services organisation.
- Joseph Edwards, Head of Production Division and Scientific Adviser, Milk Marketing Board.
- Ernest Gerald Sutherland Elliot, OBE, lately Chief Technical Planner, Ministry of Housing and Local Government.
- Thomas Godfrey Evans. For services to cricket.
- Arthur Walton Facer, Principal Executive Officer, Ministry of Pensions and National Insurance.
- Anstice Rosa Gibbs, Chief Commissioner and Chairman for the Commonwealth, Girl Guides Association.
- Alderman Reginald Eustace Goodwin, DL, Member, Bermondsey Borough Council, General Secretary, National Association of Boys' Clubs.
- Sam Green, Managing Director, Remploy Ltd.
- John Edward Maitland Gunning, OBE, Assistant Judge Advocate General, Office of the Judge Advocate General of the Forces.
- William Francis Hartop, JP, Chairman, Buckinghamshire Agricultural Executive Committee.
- George Spencer Jackson, OBE, Chief Constable, Newcastle-upon-Tyne City Police Force.
- Walter James Kimpton, Principal Accountant, Admiralty.
- Lieutenant-Colonel John Cutts Lockwood, TD, JP, Member of Parliament for Hackney, 1931–1935, and for Romford, 1950–1955. For political and public services in Essex.
- Alan Squarey MacIver, MC, Secretary, Institute of Chartered Accountants in England and Wales.
- Hugh Theodore Alexander McKeag, Consultant Orthodontist, Royal Victoria Hospital, Belfast.
- John Howard McMillan, MBE, Director, Publications Division, Central Office of Information.
- Marjorie Gray, Lady Mallinson, President Essex Branch, British Red Cross Society.
- Brian O'Donoghue Manning, DL. For political and public services in the County of London.
- Alderman Ewart Marlow, MC, JP, Chairman, Northamptonshire County Council.
- Archer John Porter Martin. For services in the development of chromatographic analysis.
- David Christie Martin, Assistant Secretary, Royal Society.
- Alexander Torovil Robert Mattick, lately Deputy Chief Scientific Officer, National Institute for Research in Dairying, Shinfield, Reading.
- Harold Mattingly. For services to numismatics.
- John Lewis Ernest Watts Mills, Actor and Producer.
- Professor George Lightbody Montgomery, TD, MD. For services as Chairman, Scottish Health Services Council.
- Lieutenant-Colonel Robert Neilson, OBE. For services in the development of estates in Sutherland.
- Francis Headon Newark, Professor of Jurisprudence, Queen's University, Belfast.
- Noel Percy Newman, JP, President, Joint Iron Council.
- Alfred James Nicholas, OBE, Managing Director, South Wales Switchgear Ltd.
- Alderman Roger Henry Parker, MC, Chairman, Board of Governors, United Cambridge Hospitals. HM Lieutenant of the County of Cambridge.
- Walter Kelso Paton, Managing Director, Ardrossan Trawling Co. Ltd.
- Harold Miller Pattinson, MBE. For political and public services in Plymouth.
- Gilbert Fawcett Peaker, Staff Inspector, Ministry of Education.
- Harold Ernest Peirce, OBE, JP, Chairman, Executive Council, National Council of Building Material Producers.
- Robert Dudley Pitt. For political and public services in Staffordshire.
- Humphrey Thomas Pledge, Keeper, Science Museum, London
- Captain Nelson Morris Price, OBE, JP, Member, War Pensions Central Advisory Committee. Chairman, North East Glamorgan War Pensions Committee.
- William Thomas Price, MC, Principal, Harper Adams Agricultural College, Newport, Shropshire.
- Frank Edward Prince, Assistant Secretary, War Office.
- Henry Thomas Ramsay, Director, Safety in Mines Research Establishment, Ministry of Power.
- Alderman Bertram Ramsey, Chairman of the Education Committee, Middlesbrough, Yorkshire.
- Francis Ian Gregory Rawlins, Deputy Keeper and Scientific Adviser, National Gallery.
- David Ayscough Rickards, Headmaster, Welbeck College.
- William Shepherd Robertson, MBE, Secretary, The Scottish Council (Development and Industry).
- Edmund Rubbra, Composer.
- George Bodley Ryle, Director of Forestry for England, Forestry Commission.
- James Arthur Sainsbury. For services to the pig industry and the food trades.
- Ralph David Satchell, Superintending Examiner, Board of Trade.
- Robert Wilfred Scarff, MB, BS, Professor of Pathology, University of London.
- Brigadier Thomas Tredwell Jackson Sheffield, OBE, TD, DL, Member, Territorial and Auxiliary Forces Association, County of Durham and of the North Riding of Yorkshire.
- Geoffrey William Boutflower Shepherd, General Manager, Carlisle and District State Management Scheme.
- Henry Arthur John Silley, Chairman R. & H. Green & Silley Weir Ltd.
- Ronald Edward Simms. For political services.
- William Kenneth Macleod Slimmings, Chairman, Development Areas Treasury Advisory Committee.
- Captain Norman Wesley Smith, Commodore, Orient Steam Navigation Company Ltd.
- Cyril Ashley Swindin, Assistant Secretary, Ministry of Labour.
- Dorothy Mary Taylor, MD, Senior Medical Officer, Ministry of Health.
- George Edward Tonge, Managing Director, Hay's Wharf Ltd.
- Cyril Charles Teesdale Turner, AFC, Managing Director, Irving Air Chute of Great Britain Ltd.
- Patrick Graeme Tweedie, OBE, Chief Inspector of Accidents (Civil Aviation), Ministry of Aviation.
- Leonard Grange Vincent, Chief Architect, Stevenage Development Corporation.
- Frank Williams, Controller, Sound Broadcasting Engineering, British Broadcasting Corporation.
- Leslie Gordon Wilson, OBE, Chairman, Safety, Health and Welfare Committee, British Employers' Confederation.
- George Leslie Wraige, Director of Maintenance Services, Ministry of Works.
- Robert Armstrong, OBE, Deputy Resident Commissioner and Government Secretary, Swaziland.
- The Right Reverend Horace Henry Dixon, Co-adjutor Bishop of Brisbane, State of Queensland.
- Lewis David Edwards, of Hamilton, State of Queensland. For services to education and the cultural life of the community.
- Clement William Lander, Chairman of Native Labour Boards, Southern Rhodesia.
- Thomas Bruce Nicol, Engineer-in-Chief, Metropolitan Water Sewerage and Drainage Board, State of New South Wales.
- Timothy Joseph O'Leary, MB, BCh, Senior Flying Doctor in the State of Queensland of the Royal Flying Doctor Service of Australia.
- Allan Pickering, MBE, Clerk of the Legislative Assembly, State of New South Wales.
- James Leonard Rossiter, Chairman of the Adult Education Board, State of Western Australia.
- John Sharples, General Manager and Deputy Chairman of the Central Electricity Board, Federation of Malaya.
- John Amyot Steward, MBE, Administrative Secretary, Office of the High Commissioner for Basutoland, the Bechuanaland Protectorate and Swaziland.
- William Stubbs, MC, Director-General of Telecommunications, Federation of Malaya.
- Henry Eugene Tancred. For services to the meat industry in the State of New South Wales.
- John McFarlane Ware. For services to Dentistry in the State of Victoria.
- Harold Braham, lately Her Majesty's Consul-General, Barcelona.
- Philip Campbell Eccles, British subject resident in the United States of America.
- William Fairley Galbraith, Chief Manager, Bank of London & South America Ltd., Brazil.
- Steriker Norman Hare, lately General Manager, Khanaqin Oil Company, Iraq.
- Ernest Frederick Harris, British subject resident in France.
- John Bruce Spens Jardine, OBE, lately British Council Representative, Iraq.
- Bryce James Miller Nairn, OBE, Her Majesty's Consul-General, Tangier.
- Lieutenant-Colonel Leslie Edwin Albert Parkin, Federation of British Industries' Representative, Germany.
- Allan Veitch, OBE, Her Majesty's Consul, Tamsui.
- John Cartmell, MBE, Director of Audit, Eastern Region, Nigeria.
- Louis Abel Célestin, MC, MD. For public services in Mauritius.
- John Desmond Clark, OBE, Director, Rhodes-Livingstone Museum, Northern Rhodesia.
- Warren Frederick Martin Clemens, OBE, MC, Defence Secretary, Cyprus.
- Mervyn Hugh Cowie, ED. For public services in Kenya.
- Leonard Charles Daldry. For public services in the Federation of Nigeria.
- Thomas Frank Davey, OBE, MD, Senior Specialist (Leprologist), Eastern Region, Nigeria.
- Michael Geoffrey de Winton, OBE, MC, Solicitor-General and Permanent Secretary Ministry of Justice, Western Region, Nigeria.
- Clifford Alfred Dove, MBE, Chairman and General Manager, Nigerian Ports Authority.
- John James Grant, Principal, Fourah Bay College, Sierra Leone.
- Godfrey Walter Higgs. For public services in the Bahamas.
- Francis Challenor Hutson. For public services in Barbados.
- Abdulkarim Yusufali Alibhai Karimjee, OBE. For public services in Tanganyika.
- Shettima Kashim, MBE, Waziri of Bornu, Northern Region, Nigeria.
- Haroun Msabila Lugusha, MBE, Chief of Sikonge. For public services in Tanganyika.
- Alhaji Abdul Maliki, Commissioner for the Federation of Nigeria in the United Kingdom.
- John Ventry Mullin, Commissioner of Police, Nyasaland.
- John Vincent Prendergast, GM, Chief of Intelligence and Head of Special Branch, Cyprus Police Force.
- John Brierley Randall, Director of Veterinary Services and Animal Industry, Uganda.
- Leonard Anthony Paul Slinger, OBE, MB, BCh, Director of Medical Services, British Guiana.
- William Tan Ho Choon. For public services in Sarawak.
- Robert Charles Duff Urquhart. For public services in The West Indies.
- Ian Malcolm Gordon Williams, OBE, Senior Administrative Officer, Cyprus.

==== Officer of the Order of the British Empire (OBE) ====
Military Division

Royal Navy

- Commander Jasper Andrew Richard Abbott, (Retired).
- Commander Hilary Charles Davey Boase, DSC, (Retired).
- The Reverend Norman Burns, Chaplain.
- Chief Officer Edith Margaret Drummond, Women's Royal Naval Service.
- Captain Franklin George Edwards, Royal Fleet Auxiliary Service.
- Surgeon Commander Joel Glass, LRCP&S, DPH.
- Acting Captain James Victor Kitchingman.
- Commander Douglas Shirley Norrington, RD, Royal Naval Reserve (Retired), Captain, Royal Fleet Auxiliary Service Service.
- Commander Alexander Walter Richards.
- Commander Henry Richard Rycroft, DSC.
- Acting Captain Gerard Talbot-Smith, DSC.
- Commander Donald Arthur Taylor, RD, Royal Naval Reserve (Retired).
- Major Peter John Frederick Whiteley, Royal Marines.
- Instructor Commander Donald Edward Albert Wiltshire.
- Commander Henry William Young, (Retired).

Army

- Lieutenant-Colonel Basil Hilary Purcell Barnes (64549), Royal Corps of Signals.
- Lieutenant-Colonel Kenneth Andrew James Gilbert Bermingham, TD, (75421), Royal Regiment of Artillery, Territorial Army.
- Lieutenant-Colonel Cecil Hugh Blacker, MC, (67083), 5th Royal Inniskilling Dragoon Guards, Royal Armoured Corps (Employed List 1).
- Lieutenant-Colonel George Brown (165155), Royal Regiment of Artillery, Territorial Army.
- Lieutenant-Colonel Thomas Welsh Carrick, MB, DPH, (154131), Royal Army Medical Corps.
- Brevet and temporary Lieutenant-Colonel Derek Raymond Carroll (277956), Corps of Royal Engineers.
- Lieutenant-Colonel Thomas William Chattey (56719), The Middlesex Regiment (Duke of Cambridge's Own) (Employed List 1).
- Lieutenant-Colonel James Charles Morton Morton-Clarke, MBE, (64617), The Duke of Edinburgh's Royal Regiment (Berkshire and Wiltshire) (Employed List 1).
- Lieutenant-Colonel Edward George Cooper (153516), Royal Regiment of Artillery.
- Lieutenant-Colonel John Gregson Cumberlege, TD, (92850), Army Legal Services Staff List.
- Lieutenant-Colonel (Brevet Colonel) Frank Herbert Everingham, MBE, TD, (194022), Royal Army Service Corps, Territorial Army (now T.A.R.O.).
- Lieutenant-Colonel John Steuart Sancroft Gratton (66140), The Royal Hampshire Regiment (Employed List 1).
- Lieutenant-Colonel (acting) Herbert Harvey, MC, (27307), Army Cadet Force.
- Lieutenant-Colonel Gerald George Langford Hinde (63552), Royal Corps of Signals.
- Lieutenant-Colonel Herbert John Johnston, TD, (68918), The Royal Ulster Rifles, Territorial Army; seconded to Officers Training Corps.
- Lieutenant-Colonel (local) David Norman Kann, MBE, (189834), Royal Army Service Corps (Employed List 3).
- Lieutenant-Colonel (Staff Quartermaster) William Charles Lacey, MBE, (358464), Employed List 2.
- Lieutenant-Colonel William Abbott Large (229048), Royal Regiment of Artillery (now R.A.R.O.).
- Lieutenant-Colonel Edmund Clavell Mansel, MC, (64523), Royal Regiment of Artillery.
- Lieutenant-Colonel John William Burton Marshall (67123), The Royal Leicestershire Regiment (Employed List 1).
- Brevet and Temporary Lieutenant-Colonel Terence Douglas Herbert McMeekin (77531), Royal Regiment of Artillery.
- Lieutenant-Colonel David McQueen, DSO, (62707), The Royal Scots (The Royal Regiment).
- Lieutenant-Colonel David Shepherd Moyes, TD, (58584), General List, Territorial Army; seconded to Officers Training Corps.
- Lieutenant-Colonel (temporary) George Nicholls (202445), Corps of Royal Military Police.
- Lieutenant-Colonel Benjamin Herbert Parker, DCM, TD, (166443), Royal Regiment of Artillery, Territorial Army.
- Lieutenant-Colonel Alan Parkin (130443), 1st East Anglian Regiment (Royal Norfolk and Suffolk) (Employed List 1).
- Lieutenant-Colonel Douglas Gordon Sansom, MC, TD, (63082), Royal Regiment of Artillery, Territorial Army.
- Lieutenant-Colonel Robert Douglas Secretan, MC, (64601), The Lancashire Fusiliers (Employed List 1).
- Lieutenant-Colonel Walter Raymond Stirk (76163), Corps of Royal Electrical and Mechanical Engineers.
- Lieutenant-Colonel David Clement Swift (66004), Royal Regiment of Artillery.
- Lieutenant-Colonel (now Colonel) Edith May Sykes (223899), Women's Royal Army Corps.
- Lieutenant-Colonel (now Colonel) Ronald Duncan Bethune Taylor, MC, (69014), late Royal Regiment of Artillery.
- Lieutenant-Colonel Victor Frederick Alexander Thorpe (273498), Royal Corps of Signals, Territorial Army (now T.A.R.O.).
- Major Geoffery Tom Edney Westbrook, MBE, (243414), Corps of Royal Engineers.

Royal Air Force

- Wing Officer Muriel Frances Arkell (937), Women's Royal Air Force (Retired).
- Wing Commander Hedley Charles Davies Blasbery (31258).
- Wing Commander Arthur Daniel Button (73118).
- Wing Commander Frederick Samuel Hazlewood, AFC, (55087).
- Wing Commander Rowland Hill (45694).
- Wing Commander Basil Silva Jones, DSO, DFC, (40834).
- Wing Commander Leonard Kendrick (49462).
- Wing Commander Thomas Knight (119305).
- Wing Commander George Edwin Langley (46285), (Retired).
- Wing Commander Edgar Bernard Loftus (45857). Royal Air Force.
- Wing Commander Thomas Patrick McGarry, DFC, (129645).
- Wing Commander Albert John Peart (46577).
- Wing Commander Arthur James Scott, DFM, (45649).
- Acting Wing Commander Cecil Ewart Whitaker (69205), Royal Air Force Volunteer Reserve (Training Branch).
- Squadron Leader William George Didcote (56641).
- Squadron Leader George Alfred Harrison (50270).
- Squadron Leader Kenneth George Hodson (145106).
- Squadron Leader Peter Leslie Kelly, BEM, (51110).
- Squadron Leader Jack Leslie Wallace, MBE, (57450).

Civil Division

- Thomas Moir Addison, Chief Executive Officer, Ministry of Works.
- Janet Ainslie, JP. For public services in Herefordshire.
- Frederick John Ash, Assistant Director (Engineering), War Office.
- Austen Leonard Baker, Chairman, Housing Committee, Swale Rural District Council, Kent.
- Lionel George Banwell, Chief Clerk, Metropolitan Juvenile Courts.
- Titus Barlow, Resident Engineer. Windscale Works, Cumberland, United Kingdom Atomic Energy Authority.
- John Barclay Barr, lately Deputy Chairman, Northumberland Agricultural Executive Committee.
- Joseph William Barrs, Chief Executive Officer, Ministry of Pensions and National Insurance.
- Harold Edward Barry, Manager, Trade Relations Department, Head Office, Shell-Mex & B.P. Ltd.
- Arnold Fielding Bates, Chairman, Sheffield National Insurance Local Appeal Tribunal.
- Edwin Bayliss, JP, DL, Chairman, North Thames Gas Consultative Council.
- Samuel Victor Beer, Councillor, Caernarvon County Council.
- George Eric Bell, Senior Principal Scientific Officer, Ministry of Aviation.
- Frederick John Brewin, lately Principal Inspector, Ministry of Aviation.
- Thomas Arthur Briggs, Chief Executive Officer, Ministry of Health.
- Charles John Brown, MBE, Grade IA Officer, Branch B, Foreign Office.
- Jack Gordon Bruton, Director of Studies, Central Institute of English, British Council, Hyderabad, India.
- Colonel Edmund Pullar Buchanan, MC, JP, DL, lately Chairman, Territorial and Auxiliary Forces Association, County of Stirling.
- Reginald Henry Markham Burton, Certifying Officer, Rugby Market, Warwickshire.
- Frederick Butler, Senior Principal Scientific Officer, Foreign Office.
- Charles James McDougall Cadzow, Secretary, Scottish Agricultural Organisation Society.
- John Watson Cameron. For political and public services in The Hartlepools.
- Ann Alicia Campbell, JP. For political and public services in County Antrim.
- George Ronald Clegg, Staff Controller, London Postal Region, General Post Office.
- Alick William Hamilton Cole, Manager, Communications Division, Marconi's Wireless Telegraph Co. Ltd.
- Reginald Thomas Colgate, Chairman of Council, British Baking Industries Research Association.
- Spencer Victor Collard, Divisional Veterinary Officer, Ministry of Agriculture, Fisheries and Food.
- John Stewart Collins. For political services in West London.
- Sidney John Cordery. For political and public services in Coventry.
- Henry Knowles Corlett, JP, Member, House of Keys, Isle of Man.
- Archibald John Murray Cox, Chief Accountant, Board of Trade.
- William Alexander Cramond, MD, Physician Superintendent, Woodilee Mental Hospital, Lenzie.
- Colonel William James Cranston, DSO. For services to the "Not Forgotten" Association.
- Thomas Harold Craxton, Accompanist.
- Eric Arthur Cusworth, MC, Regional Controller, Northern Region, National Assistance Board.
- Elma Tryphosa Dangerfield, Honorary Director, European-Atlantic Group.
- Thomas George Davies, MBE, Chairman, Cardiff Industrial Savings Committee.
- Thomas Ivor Davies, Deputy Headmaster, John Bright Grammar School, Llandudno.
- William Tudor Davies, JP, Member, London Local Tribunal for Conscientious Objectors.
- Gladys Mary Davis. For political and public services in Birmingham.
- William Harold Dawson, Director of Education and Chief Education Officer, County Armagh Education Committee.
- Isobel Marjorie Marcham Dean, HM Inspector of Schools, Ministry of Education.
- James Leslie Haynes-Dixon, Chief Executive Officer, Central Office of Information.
- Marion Sarah Dobson. For political and public services in Bolton.
- Colonel Philip Docker, TD, DL. For services to the British Legion in Warwickshire.
- Jane Elizabeth Dockrill, MBE, Chairman, Southern Regional Street and Village Savings Advisory Committee.
- John George Dunlop, Principal Officer, Ministry of Home Affairs for Northern Ireland.
- William Dyer. For political and public services in Galloway.
- James Donald Eadie, Chairman, J. D. Eadie & Co. (Wolverhampton) Ltd.
- William Herbert Earle, Deputy Controller, Commonwealth Division, British Council.
- John Ellis, Superintending Civil Engineer, Grade II, lately Air Ministry.
- Anna Evans. For political and public services in Ludlow.
- Henry James Evans, MBE, Commander, Metropolitan Police Force.
- Henry John Norman Fentiman, MM, Secretary and Treasurer, Representative Church Council, Episcopal Church in Scotland.
- John William Clyde Flint, Principal Inspector, Board of Customs and Excise.
- Albert Edward Foster, Chief Executive Officer, Home Office.
- Cyril Frederick Fox, Assistant Director for Wales (Works), Ministry of Works.
- Lieutenant-Colonel Thomas Smith Gibson, MC, TD, Member, Territorial and Auxiliary Forces Association, County of Dunbarton.
- George Robert Glendinning, Chief Constable, Perthshire and Kinross-shire, Constabulary.
- Jack Goss, Principal, Admiralty.
- John Cyril Gough, lately Chief Inspector, Safety and Wages Inspectorate, Ministry of Agriculture, Fisheries and Food.
- William Ernest Gowers, lately Chairman, East Wales Local Productivity Council.
- Mary Gardner Grierson, Senior Lecturer in Music, University of Edinburgh.
- Alan Arthur Clement Griffith, Constructor, HM Dockyard, Gibraltar.
- Andrew Edward Hahn, Secretary, Sheffield Chamber of Commerce.
- William Joseph Haimes, Grade 2 Officer, Ministry of Labour.
- John Sherwood Hales, Director, Industrial and Domestic Development Laboratories, British Coal Utilisation Research Association.
- Henry Joel Hamblin, Senior Principal Scientific Officer, National Institute of Agricultural Engineering, Wrest Park, Silsoe, Bedfordshire.
- Alan Waites Hansell, MB, BS, General Practitioner and Medical Officer of Health, Bedale, Yorkshire.
- John Richard Hardern, JP, Chairman, Isles of Scilly Agricultural Executive Committee.
- Major John Cecil Hawkes, Senior Chief Executive Officer, Foreign Office.
- William James Hawkins, JP. For political services in County Antrim.
- John Edward Heritage, National Secretary, (Government and Municipal Workers' Sections), Transport and General Workers' Union.
- Sidney Frank Hewett, MM, lately Senior Chief Executive Officer, Ministry of Pensions and National Insurance.
- Ernest Hickling, Chairman and Managing Director, John Gilroy & Sons (Wisbech) Ltd. For services to the marketing of fruit and vegetables.
- Elliot John Hinchliffe, Principal Inspector of Taxes, Board of Inland Revenue.
- Edward George Hobbs, Chief Officer, Buckinghamshire Fire Brigade.
- Elsie Hollings, Principal, Manchester Domestic and Trades College.
- Stanley Augustus Holloway, Actor.
- Percy Mynors Holman, Chairman, Cornwall District Advisory Committee, South Western Regional Board for Industry.
- Thomas Hutchinson Hopkins, Technical Adviser, Acton Office, War Damage Commission.
- Leonard Neal Hopper, Research Officer, Cardiff, Board of Trade.
- Percy Guy Horsler, MC, HM Superintending Inspector of Factories, Ministry of Labour.
- Robert Hugh Stannus Howell, Head of Building Department, British Broadcasting Corporation.
- Arthur Francis Walter Humphrys, MBE, former Secretary, Churchill College Trust.
- Percy Hyde, Engineer Commodore, SS British Robin, B.P. Tanker Co. Ltd., London.
- Ada May Eleanora Iredale. For services to Guildford Cathedral.
- Major Richard John Laurence Jackson, JP. For political and public services in the North Riding of Yorkshire.
- Captain Alexander Campbell Johnston, Master, MS Cilicia, Anchor Line, Glasgow.
- Donald Frederick Kerr, Chief Information Officer, Commonwealth Relations Office.
- Eunice Evelyn Kidd, President, Chick Producers Association.
- Derrick William King, Librarian, War Office.
- Alfred Sam Knight, Command Supervisor, Naval Canteen Service, Navy, Army and Air Force Institutes, Portsmouth.
- Wilfred Thomas Lack, JP. For political and public services in Dunstable.
- James Finlay Langmuir, JP, Stipendiary Magistrate, Glasgow.
- Leslie Ernest Laycock, JP, Chairman of Governors, Leeds College of Commerce.
- John Albert Lewry, Principal Clerk, Board of Inland Revenue.
- Peter Alun Lloyd, Honorary Secretary, London Welsh Association.
- Taliesin John Lloyd. For public services in Merthyr Tydfil.
- William Kenneth Mackenzie, Deputy Regional Director, Midland Region, General Post Office.
- Douglas Morton McLachlan, JP, Assistant County Commissioner, Glasgow Boy Scouts Association.
- Duncan Macmillan, MD, FRCP.Ed., Physician Superintendent, Mapperley Hospital, Nottingham.
- George McSpadden, Chairman, Down County Council.
- John Alexander McVicker, MB, BCh, Member, Northern Ireland General Health Services Board.
- Ernest Marshall, Manager (Engineer I), Royal Ordnance Factory, Birtley, County Durham.
- Richard Clare Martin, Chairman, Anglo-Egyptian Aid Society.
- Donald Edgar Mason, Principal School Dental Officer, Nottinghamshire.
- Thomas Henry Mellor, JP. For political and public services in Lancashire.
- Thomas Goodley Menzies. For political services in Glasgow.
- William Harry Millar, Senior Inspector of Taxes, Board of Inland Revenue.
- Leslie Robert Milsom, Higher Collector, Bristol, Board of Customs and Excise.
- Cyril Moss, Assistant Keeper, First Class, Department of Oriental Printed Books and Manuscripts, British Museum.
- Leslie Clarke Mulligan, Registrar-General for Northern Ireland.
- David William Nunn, Senior Quantity Surveyor, Ministry of Housing and Local Government.
- Gerald Edmund O'Brien. For political services.
- Herbert William Ruddock Ogram, Chairman, Humber Port Welfare Committee.
- Lieutenant-Colonel John William Arthur Ollard, DL, Alderman, Isle of Ely County Council.
- Hubert Alfred Walter Oughton, Secretary, Press Advertising Committee for National Savings.
- Norman Henry Parfitt, MC, First Class Valuer, Board of Inland Revenue.
- John Butler Parry, Senior Principal Psychologist, Air Ministry.
- John Owen Parry, Chairman, Ammanford and District Local Employment Committee.
- Richard Almack Pearson, Joint Intelligence Bureau Officer, Grade 1, Ministry of Defence.
- Albert Edward Pedgrift, DCM, Grade 2 Officer, Ministry of Labour.
- Alfred Walter Player, Managing Director, Fleming & Ferguson Ltd., Paisley, Renfrewshire.
- John Poole, lately Town Clerk, Borough of Uxbridge.
- John Meiklejohn Saunders Potter, Director, National Fruit Variety Testing Station, Ministry of Agriculture, Fisheries and Food.
- Harry Wilfrid Pout, Senior Principal Scientific Officer, Admiralty.
- Anthony William Pragnell, DFC, Secretary, Independent Television Authority.
- George Frederick Reader, Senior Engineer, Midland Division, Ministry of Transport.
- Matthew Kirkpatrick Reid, Member of Clothing Wages Councils.
- Elsie Renwick, Matron, The Glasgow Royal Maternity and Women's Hospital.
- William John Ridd, Chief Constable, West Suffolk Constabulary.
- Frederick Joseph Rossi, Director, Brega & Rossi, Wine Importers. For services to the wine industry in Cyprus.
- Alderman the Reverend Harcourt Samuel, Chairman, Thanet Disablement Advisory Committee.
- John Scholes, MBE, Senior Chief Executive Officer, HM Treasury.
- Ernest James Scott, MC. For services to water polo.
- Joan Violet Scott, Branch Director, Gloucestershire Branch, British Red Cross Society.
- Frederick Charles Sharpley, Grade 1 Officer, Ministry of Labour.
- Robert John Everett Silvey, Head of Audience Research, British Broadcasting Corporation.
- Douglas Smith, JP, Chairman and Joint Managing Director, Smith & Walton Ltd., Northumberland.
- Jessica Stella Smith, lately Matron, Stallington Hall Hospital, Stoke-on-Trent.
- Captain John Smith, Superintendent in charge of new building, Ben Line Steamers Ltd., Edinburgh.
- Captain Thomas Butler Stoney, DFC, Flight Manager, Boeing 707 Flight, British Overseas Airways Corporation.
- Alderman Dorothy Elsie Stringer. For public services in Brighton.
- Rhoda Strutt, President, British Friesian Cattle Society.
- Thomas Charles Sutton, Chief Executive Officer, Ministry of Pensions and National Insurance.
- Marjorie Winifred Swayne. For political and public services in Guildford.
- Alexander Symon, Manager, Sales Engineering, Bristol Aircraft Co. Ltd.
- Clement Edward Page Taylor, DL, Chairman, Middlesex Advisory Committee, National Assistance Board.
- Alderman John Aked Taylor, TD, JP. For political and public services in Keighley.
- John Stuart Hamilton Thomas. For political services in South Wales.
- Lily Letitia Thompson, Chairman, Nursing Committee, Northern Ireland Hospitals Authority.
- Mary Scott Thomson, HM Inspector of Schools (Higher Grade), Scottish Education Department.
- Eric Johnson Timberlake, Joint Managing Director, Electro Dynamic Construction Co. Ltd., St. Mary Cray, Kent.
- Captain Hugh Topley, Principal Examiner of Masters and Mates, Ministry of Transport.
- Clifford James Tremewan, JP, Chairman, Darlington Civil Defence Committee.
- William Reginald Trigger, Head Postmaster, Nottingham.
- Margaret Gladys Triggs, MBE, Head of Transport Department, Women's Voluntary Services.
- Walter Ernest Tyrrell, Actuary and General Manager, Belfast Savings Bank.
- Frederick Vincent, lately Chairman, Milk and Dairy Produce Committee, National Farmers' Union.
- John James Voyce, JP, Headmaster, Silver Jubilee Secondary Modern Boys' School, Bedford.
- William George Wadmore, Waterguard Superintendent, Belfast, Board of Customs and Excise.
- John William Walker, MBE, Chief Executive Officer, Air Ministry.
- William Fulton Walker, MBE, Chairman, Argyll, Renfrew and Bute War Pensions Committee.
- The Honourable Pamela Frances Walpole, MBE, Member, National Savings Assembly, representing Norwich and North-East Norfolk.
- Percival Henry Watson, Assistant Director (Engineer), Aircraft Design Requirements, Ministry of Aviation.
- George Watts, Secretary, Oxford Regional Hospital Board.
- Ruth Maybell Webster, MVO, Censorship Clerk, Lord Chamberlain's Office.
- James Edward Whittaker, Area Manager, North of Scotland Hydro-Electric Board, Aberdeen.
- Ernest Thomas Wilkins, Principal Scientific Officer, Department of Scientific and Industrial Research.
- Ashley Egerton Wilmot Williams, Grade 1 Conference Officer, Foreign Office.
- Harold Sandys Williamson, lately Headmaster, Chelsea School of Art.
- Andrew Wilson, Principal Executive Officer, lately Regional Director (North Western Region), Ministry of Power.
- Norman Alexander Bruce Wilson, Senior Principal Psychologist, Admiralty.
- Sybil Douglas Wingate, Principal, Board of Trade.
- Frederick Reginald Winn, Chief Executive Officer, Board of Customs and Excise.
- Harry Francis Wood, MBE, JP, Chairman, Stoke-on-Trent Savings Committee.
- Helen Marguerite Muir-Wood, Deputy Keeper of Palaeontology, British Museum (Natural History).
- William Henry Woods, MBE, Firemaster, North-Eastern Area of Scotland Fire Brigade.
- Charles Ernest Wooland, Chief Executive Officer, Ministry of Agriculture, Fisheries and Food.
- Alfred Godfrey Wright, Chairman, Flood Protection Committee, Great Ouse River Board.
- John Parker Young, Divisional Manager, Scottish Division, British Road Services.
- Edward Bertram Arnold, British subject resident in Venezuela.
- Frank Hargreaves Atherton, British subject resident in Mexico.
- William Bailey, DSC, GM, British subject resident in Portugal.
- Captain Graham Balfour, Assistant Headmaster, The Grange School, Santiago.
- Bertram Balshaw, British subject resident in Peru.
- Harry Leslie Baldwin Coe, MBE, lately Her Majesty's Consul, Baghdad.
- John Herald, British subject resident in Argentina.
- Casimiro Peter Hugh Tomasi Isolani, MBE, First Secretary (Information), Her Majesty's Embassy, Rome.
- Oliver Kemp, First Secretary, Her Majesty's Embassy, Vientiane.
- Donald James Dundas Maitland, Director, Middle East Centre for Arabic Studies.
- Ian McMaster, Her Majesty's Consul, Florence, and Her Majesty's Consul-General, San Marino.
- Edward Robert Hugh Paget, British Council Representative, The Netherlands.
- Thomas Charles Sharman, Her Majesty's Consul (Commercial), Hamburg.
- Rebecca Sieff, British subject resident in Israel.
- Leslie Charles Smith, Regional Information Officer in Hong Kong of the Office of the United Kingdom Commissioner for Singapore and South-East Asia.
- Maurice Macalaster Symington, British subject resident in Portugal.
- Jocelin Winthrop Young, lately Headmaster, Anavryta School, Greece.
- Councillor Albert Leslie Backwell, of the Geelong City Council, State of Victoria.
- Rowland Alan Robertson Bent, Development Secretary, Bechuanaland Protectorate.
- Jonathan Edgar Meredith Cave, MC, formerly Secretary to the Minister of Natural Resources, Federation of Malaya.
- Clarence Caleb Corbett, Chairman of the Water Conservation and Irrigation Commission, State of New South Wales.
- Ralph Edwin DeGaris, of Millicent, State of South Australia. For services to the community.
- John Ralph Donaldson, ED, MB, BS, formerly Commissioner of the St. John Ambulance Brigade, State of Western Australia.
- William Clement Greaves, a Councillor in the Shire of Cranbourne, State of Victoria, 1925-59.
- Francis Bertram Harvey, formerly Deputy Railways Commissioner, State of South Australia.
- Mabel Emily Hedditch, JP, Mayor of the Town of Portland, State of Victoria.
- Oswald Herbert Heinrich. For services to Agriculture and Local Government in the State of South Australia.
- John Hedley Hindmarsh, formerly Deputy Commissioner of Police, Federation of Malaya.
- Florence Hummerston, JP. For social welfare services in the State of Western Australia.
- Robert Douglas James, MC, a member of the Land Settlement Board, Southern Rhodesia.
- John Love, Commissioner of Local Government, Federation of Malaya.
- James Charlton Macgibbon, Assistant Secretary, Premier's Department, State of Victoria.
- Ernest Peter McMaster, JP, of Prahran, State of Victoria. For social welfare and municipal services.
- Harry Rowan Martin, City Treasurer, Salisbury, Southern Rhodesia.
- Richard Lawrence Murray, formerly Auditor-General, State of Queensland.
- Robert John Roy O'Neile, formerly General Secretary, Public Service Association, State of New South Wales.
- Patrick Edward Gladstone Woodbine Parish. For services to the United Kingdom community in Calcutta, India.
- Councillor Ernest Edwin Parr, Chairman of the Tambo Shire Council, State of Queensland.
- Lieutenant-Colonel John Esplen Falconer Paton. For services rendered under the auspices of the Over-Seas League to Commonwealth visitors.
- George Sheldon Patterson, Acting Principal Establishment Officer, Federation Establishment Office, Federation of. Malaya.
- Arnold William Potts, DSO, MC. For services to the community in the Kojonup district, State of Western Australia.
- John Francis Brownlee Purcell, MBE, Secretary for Swazi Affairs in the Swaziland Administration.
- George Stanley Roberts, Manager of the Melbourne Office, Government Tourist Department, State of Tasmania.
- James Harry Redin Savory, Director of Irrigation, Southern Rhodesia.
- Denis George Frederick Silburn, Senior District Officer and Judicial Commissioner in the Swaziland Administration.
- Howard Hazelhurst Smetham, MC, Chairman of the Borradaile Trust, Southern Rhodesia.
- Eileen Rosamund Barter Snow, MB, BS. For services to the United Kingdom community in the Punjab, India.
- Bridget Yelverton, Lady Lee Steere. For services to the Girl Guides Movement in the State of Western Australia.
- Hugh Bryson Calwell Wallace, MD, Specialist Physician, Medical Service, Federation of Malaya.
- Basil Dudley Whitworth, MB, BCh, Director of Medical Services, Swaziland.
- Robert Keith Yorston, of Sydney, State of New South Wales. For public services.
- Martha Young, President and Honorary Recorder, Women's Historical Association, State of Queensland.
- Valdemar Jens Andersen, MBE, Secretary for Protectorate Affairs, British Solomon Islands Protectorate.
- Douglas Graham Ansell. For public services in Nyasaland.
- John Alan Austin, Director of Agriculture, Gambia.
- Alfred Edward Baker, Senior Engineer, Crown Agents for Oversea Governments and Administrations.
- Kenneth William Barley, Deputy Head of Finance Department, Crown Agents for Oversea Governments and Administrations.
- Reginald Barrett, Principal Secretary, Office of Nigeria Liaison Officer, Washington.
- James Bayliss, Government Printer, Ibadan, Western Region, Nigeria.
- Francis Haddon Bowen, Senior Lecturer in Physics, Warden and Member of the Senate, University College of the West Indies.
- The Honourable Alexander Pascoe Hovell-Thurlow-Cumming-Bruce, Assistant Chief Secretary, Aden.
- Gerald Jackson Bryan, MC, Establishment Secretary, Mauritius.
- Robert Calderwood, MB, ChB, lately Deputy Secretary to the Ministry of Health and Deputy Director of Medical Services Singapore.
- Ian Donald Cameron, Acting Permanent Secretary, Ministry of Local Government, Western Region, Nigeria.
- Gervase de la Poer Cassels, MBE, Establishment Secretary, Cyprus.
- James Wood Clapperton. For public services in Nyasaland.
- Alfred Bimbisara Abayomi-Cole, MB, BS, Senior Medical Officer, Sierra Leone.
- John James Cowperthwaite, Deputy Financial Secretary, Hong Kong.
- Arthur Barry Cozens, Chief Inspector of Education, Eastern Region, Nigeria.
- Donald Falconer Davidson, Conservator of Forests, Cyprus.
- Merlin Ivor Davies, Water Engineer, Ministry of Works, Northern Region, Nigeria.
- Frank Sapenne Delisle, MBE. For public services in the Leeward Islands.
- Frederick Seguier Drake, Professor of Chinese in the University of Hong Kong and Director of the Institute of Oriental Studies.
- Dermot John Dunn, Director of Public Works, Cyprus.
- Harold Herbert Dunn. For public services in Jamaica.
- William Glyn Evans, MRCS, LRCP, lately Director of Medical Services, Sarawak.
- Soyode Obafunmilayo Olumuyiwa Franklin, MB, BCh, Chief Medical Officer, Ministry of Health and Social Welfare, Western Region, Nigeria.
- Jean Arthur Gemmell, MB, ChB, Medical Superintendent, Maternity Clinic, Aden.
- Beatrice May Griffin, Principal Matron, Singapore.
- Clifford Griffith, Accountant-General, Somaliland Protectorate.
- Charles Henry Gurd, MB, MRCP, Physician Specialist, Fiji.
- Norman George Broome Guy, MBE, Chief Surveyor, Tanganyika.
- Michael Kleanthous Haralampides, Postmaster-General, Cyprus.
- Albert Henry Hawker, Assistant Chief Secretary, Zanzibar.
- Denis Aynesley Henry. For public services in the Windward Islands.
- Kenneth Arthur Lulham Hill, Registrar of Co-operative Societies, Sierra Leone.
- Franklin Derek Homan, African Land Tenure Officer, Kenya.
- Reginald Heber James, Headmaster, Duke of York School, Nairobi, Kenya.
- Harold Charles Johnson. For public services in North Borneo.
- Edwin Lee Lum, JP. For public services in Trinidad.
- Ian William James McAdam, FRCS.Ed., Professor of Surgery, University College of East Africa, Makerere, Uganda.
- Salvino Mangion, Director of Public Works, Malta.
- Patrick Manley, Commissioner of Prisons, Tanganyika.
- Theodora Phillipa Obafunmilayo Manuwa. For public services in the Federation of Nigeria.
- Elizabeth Theodora Mess, FRCS.Ed. For public services in the Northern Region, Nigeria.
- Percy Croft Minns, Commissioner for Higher Community Development, Uganda.
- Harold Kitson Mitchell. For public services in Northern Rhodesia.
- John Hilton McBean Moore. For public services in British Guiana.
- Njiri Karanja, MBE, lately Senior Chief, Kenya.
- Ahmet Orhan, Chief Veterinary Officer, Cyprus.
- Michael Somerville Porcher, Deputy Chief Secretary, British Guiana.
- Denys Tudor Emil Roberts, Crown Counsel, Nyasaland.
- Alberto Maria Rodrigues, MBE, ED, MB, BS. For public services in Hong Kong.
- Osmond Melbourne Royes, Chief Electoral Officer, Jamaica.
- Ernest Walter Sergeant. For public services in Northern Rhodesia.
- Howard Braithwaite Stent, Director, East African Industrial Research Organisation, East Africa High Commission.
- Douglas Eric Thompson, MRCS, LRCP, Senior Medical Officer, Tanganyika.
- William Thomson, JP. For public services in Gibraltar.
- Lawrence Obiesi Uwechia, Member, Public Service Commission, Eastern Region, Nigeria.
- Donald Alonzo Wiles, Permanent Secretary to the Ministry of Communications, Works and Housing, Barbados.

==== Member of the Order of the British Empire (MBE) ====
===== Military Division =====
Royal Navy

- Lieutenant-Commander (S.D.) Edwin George Braund Annis.
- Lieutenant-Commander John Frederick Benson, (Retired).
- Lieutenant-Commander Alfred George Bishop, Royal Naval Reserve.
- Lieutenant-Commander Peter Graham Burden.
- Instructor Lieutenant-Commander Edward Hayden Chittleburgh.
- Captain James Frederick Emlyn Clarke, Royal Marines.
- Electrical Lieutenant-Commander Herbert William Gidley.
- Sub-Lieutenant (S.D.) Roger Harvey Harris.
- Lieutenant-Commander (S.C.C.) Edward Stuart Pierce Harrison, VRD, Royal Naval Reserve.
- Engineer Lieutenant-Commander Mark Edward Higman.
- Recruiting Officer Horace Edward Hogben.
- Mr. George Mornington Manuel, Radio Officer, Royal Fleet Auxiliary Service.
- Lieutenant-Commander Kenneth Jack Moyes.
- First Officer Isabel Joan Scott, Women's Royal Naval Service (Retired).

Army

- Major (Staff Quartermaster) Alexander John Ansell (137603), Employed List 2.
- Major Arthur John Archer (323707), The Devonshire and Dorset Regiment.
- Major (acting) Ernest Percy Ball, TD, (238198), Combined Cadet Force.
- Captain Edward Albert Bell (350857), The Lancashire Fusiliers (Employed List 4).
- 3531956 Warrant Officer Class I Harold Bellis, The King's Regiment (Manchester and Liverpool).
- Major Clifford John Borrett (217829), Royal Regiment of Artillery (now R.A.R.O.).
- Major David Alexander Breese, TD.(264541), Corps of Royal Engineers, Territorial Army.
- W/108762 Warrant Officer Class II Eileen Francis Mary Buckle, Women's Royal Army Corps.
- 3957997 Warrant Officer Class I Sidney James Cannon, The Welch Regiment.
- Major Edward Stephen Nesbitt Clarke, MM, (262273), 11th Hussars (Prince Albert's Own), Royal Armoured Corps.
- Major (Quartermaster) William Thomas George Clarke (318786), The Northamptonshire Regiment.
- Captain (Quartermaster) William Henry Cobb (432228), The Cheshire Regiment.
- Major Denis Edward Cuff (124990), Royal Army Service Corps.
- 21004587 Warrant Officer Class II Robert Douglas Dean, Corps of Royal Engineers, Territorial Army.
- Major Edward Morley Dickenson (32296), Royal Tank Regiment, Royal Armoured Corps.
- Captain Albert Reginald Button (240549), Royal Army Ordnance Corps.
- Major Ian Claude Dyer (129619), 3rd East Anglian Regiment (16th/44th Foot) (now R.A.R.O.).
- Major Peter George Elliott (56136), Royal Regiment of Artillery.
- S/57775 Warrant Officer Class I Richard Else, Royal Army Service Corps.
- Major (Quartermaster) Leonard James Field (190411), Corps of Royal Engineers.
- Major Leslie Louis Fleming, MC, (345094), The Durham Light Infantry.
- Major Denis Barraclough Fox (184578), 1st Green Jackets, 43rd and 52nd.
- Lieutenant Peter Lincoln Fussell. BEM, (461895), General List.
- Major (Quartermaster) William John Garrow (420680), General List (now R.A.R.O.).
- Major John Thomas William Griffin (285498), Royal Regiment of Artillery (Employed List 3).
- Major Alan Sydney Harman (399667), Royal Regiment of Artillery, Territorial Army.
- 7610021 Warrant Officer Class I Herbert Martin Harvey, Corps of Royal Electrical and Mechanical Engineers.
- Major (Quartermaster) Albert James Holmes (307731), The Duke of Edinburgh's Royal Regiment (Berkshire and Wiltshire) (now retired).
- Major William John Hotblack (184916), Royal Tank Regiment, Royal Armoured Corps.
- Major Douglas Alan Johnson, MC, (77529), Royal Regiment of Artillery.
- 5381357 Warrant Officer Class I Jack Owen Jones, The King's Shropshire Light Infantry.
- 2069711 Warrant Officer Class II Stanley William Karsten, Corps of Royal Engineers, Territorial Army.
- Major the Honourable Verona Vandeleur Kitson (221956), Women's Royal Army Corps, Territorial Army.
- Captain Douglas Lee (120079), Army Catering Corps, Territorial Army.
- 903941 Warrant Officer Class II Cyril John Leivers, Royal Regiment of Artillery, Territorial Army.
- Major (Assistant Inspecting Ordnance Officer) Leonard Lewis (256899), Royal Army Ordnance Corps.
- 22961521 Warrant Officer Class II James Leys, Royal Regiment of Artillery, Territorial Army.
- Major (Director of Music) Jean Barclay MacDowall (252256), Women's Royal Army Corps.
- Major Thomas McLaren (348711), Royal Army Service Corps, Territorial Army.
- 22207590 Warrant Officer Class II Richard Ernest Miles, Royal Regiment of Artillery, Territorial Army.
- Captain (acting) Edward Harry Mole (280332), Army Cadet Force.
- Captain Donald Stanley Molock, MC, (330738), Royal Regiment of Artillery.
- 22962476 Warrant Officer Class II Frederick James Morris, Royal Regiment of Artillery, Territorial Army.
- Major (Education Officer) Sidney Martin Morris (69727), Royal Army Educational Corps.
- 7630546 Warrant Officer Class II Eric Frank Morton, Royal Army Ordnance Corps.
- Major Henry James Wells Newton (219882), 1st Green Jackets, 43rd and 52nd.
- 6008586 Warrant Officer Class II Frederick Noakes, Royal Army Ordnance Corps.
- 4443990 Warrant Officer Class I (Bandmaster) Thomas Noble, 16th/5th The Queen's Royal Lancers, Royal Armoured Corps.
- 22207498 Warrant Officer Class II Henry James Osborne, Royal Regiment of Artillery, Territorial Army.
- Major (temporary) Douglas Stuart Paton, MB, (424915), Royal Army Medical Corps.
- The Reverend John Maurice Pickering, Chaplain to the Forces, Third Class (301239), Royal Army Chaplains' Department.
- Major (Quartermaster) Edward Thomas Pinnock, MM, (282718), 3rd Green Jackets, The Rifle Brigade; attached Special Air Service Regiment.
- 21018134 Warrant Officer Class II Alexander Richards, Royal Army Ordnance Corps.
- Major (Quartermaster) Donald Frederick Robarts (396853), Royal Horse Guards (The Blues).
- Major Peter Whitehead Rogerson (281366), Royal Corps of Signals.
- 896707 Warrant Officer Class II Ronald James Saunders, Royal Regiment of Artillery, Territorial Army.
- Captain Frank Scott (269550), Royal Corps of Signals, Territorial Army.
- Major John Alexander Sellers (354640), The Duke of Edinburgh's Royal Regiment (Berkshire and Wiltshire).
- 3855698 Warrant Officer Class I (Bandmaster) Trevor LeMare Sharpe, The Buffs (Royal East Kent Regiment).
- Major Robert Thomas Spaceman (163936), Royal Army Ordnance Corps (now retired).
- Lieutenant (Quartermaster) Alexander Spiers (450065), Seaforth Highlanders (Ross-shire Buffs, The Duke of Albany's).
- Major (Director of Music) Frank Leslie Statham (384386), Welsh Guards.
- Major (Quartermaster) Frederick William Stevens, BEM, (171368), Royal Army Medical Corps, Territorial Army.
- 7676630 Warrant Officer Class II Eric Sidney Swift, Royal Army Pay Corps.
- Captain (acting) Arthur Francis Syrett (389440), Army Cadet Force.
- 3129045 Warrant Officer Class I Charles Thompson, MM, The Royal Highland Fusiliers (Princess Margaret's Own Glasgow and Ayrshire Regiment).
- 1883581 Warrant Officer Class I Kenneth Arthur Sidney Tooke, Corps of Royal Engineers.
- Lieutenant (Quartermaster) Kenneth Bernard Ulrich (451031), Royal Corps of Signals.
- T/110528 Warrant Officer Class I Leslie Varley, Royal Army Service Corps.
- Major Stanley Vickers (37364), The Royal Fusiliers (City of London Regiment) (now retired).
- Major Henry Wilson Warton (273605), Corps of Royal Electrical and Mechanical Engineers, Territorial Army (now retired).
- Major Dennis Vivian Wellings (175185), Royal Corps of Signals.
- 2733667 Warrant Officer Class I (acting) Geoffrey Leonard Wilkinson, Welsh Guards (serving with Singapore Military Forces).
- Major (Quartermaster) Leslie James Wood (163978), The Prince of Wales's Own Regiment of Yorkshire.
- Major Edward George Wright, MC, (149391), The Royal Hampshire Regiment.
- Captain (Electrical Mechanical Assistant Engineer) Wilfred Bernard Nash (426668), Corps of Royal Electrical and Mechanical Engineers.

Royal Air Force

- Squadron Leader Frank Charles Airey (142050).
- Squadron Leader (Acting Wing Commander) Herbert Ernest Bennett (48846).
- Squadron Leader James Cartwright (152632).
- Squadron Leader Harold Downing Elmes (54809).
- Squadron Leader Cecil John Winser Herold (53569).
- Squadron Leader Antoni Perry (500704).
- Squadron Leader Howard Hargreaves Pickard (159204).
- Squadron Leader Herbert Crawshaw Scott (49224).
- Squadron Leader Prior Fenton Smith (115076).
- Squadron Leader John Antony Steff-Langston (58566).
- Squadron Leader Roy Stephens (49487).
- Squadron Leader Trevor Jenkin Thomas (185097).
- Squadron Leader Barry Trodd (174163).
- Acting Squadron Leader James Baseley (47670).
- Acting Squadron Leader Richmond David Charles Jones Pitman (65875), Royal Air Force Volunteer Reserve (Training Branch).
- Flight Lieutenant Richard Kenneth Desmond Cooper (519092).
- Flight Lieutenant Lionel Cuthbert Eagle (46967).
- Flight Lieutenant William Hunter Ellyard (501884).
- Flight Lieutenant Thomas Henry French (170688).
- Flight Lieutenant John Gant, DFM, (1600632).
- Flight Lieutenant Roy Jackson, DFM, (53589).
- Flight Lieutenant David John Jones (516382).
- Flight Lieutenant Ronald John Kingdom (198936).
- Flight Lieutenant Albert Osmund Lucas (55884).
- Flight Lieutenant Anthony Reginald Bennett Pointer (147983).
- Flight Lieutenant Richard Gladstone Robertson (2579702).
- Flight Lieutenant Paul Adrian Spencer (155157).
- Flight Lieutenant William Watson Ivor Walker (51664).
- Acting Flight Lieutenant Edward Francis Hares (184860), Royal Air Force Volunteer Reserve (Training Branch).
- Warrant Officer Cyril Ball (630280).
- Warrant Officer Harold Valentine Barling (536178).
- Warrant Officer Denys Broughton (539593).
- Warrant Officer Jack Richard Doody (514295).
- Warrant Officer Cyril Percival Gilbert (560138).
- Warrant Officer Ronald Alfred Green (566627).
- Warrant Officer George Gwilliam (541984).
- Warrant Officer Reginald Proudlove (514827).
- Warrant Officer Harold Pulford (613362).
- Warrant Officer Albert Clifford St. Quentin Sansom (567310).
- Warrant Officer Edgar Thomas (506719), Royal Air Force Regiment.
- Warrant Officer John William Walters (591062).
- Warrant Officer Denis Alfred Warnett (512667).
- Warrant Officer Reginald Ernest Watkins (515748).
- Warrant Officer John Webb (521635).
- Warrant Officer Reginald Lewis Williams (513105).

===== Civil Division =====
- Stanley Gervase Aberdein, lately Commercial Manager, North Thames Gas Board.
- Winifred Lilian Adams, Inspector, Blind Welfare, Ministry of Health.
- Arthur George Akers, Area Secretary, Road Haulage Association, West of England.
- Walter Stoddart Alexander, Chairman, Glasgow North National Assistance Appeal Tribunal.
- John David Allan, lately Area Technical Adviser on Meat Inspection, Ministry of Agriculture, Fisheries and Food.
- Alaric Allen, Chief Development Engineer, Cossor Radar & Electronics Ltd., Harlow, Essex.
- The Honourable Ada Mary Ammon, District Commissioner, National Savings Committee.
- George Heath Anderson, Senior Executive Officer, War Office.
- John Anderson, Engineer, Cheshire River Board.
- Isabel Georgina Florence Andrew. For political and public services in Northampton.
- Arthur Bertie Apperly, Higher Executive Officer, Yorkshire Traffic Area, Ministry of Transport.
- Bertram Richard Arkwright, Senior Assistant Land Commissioner, Ministry of Agriculture, Fisheries and Food.
- Arthur William Aspital, Higher Executive Officer, Department of Prints and Drawings, British Museum.
- Henry William Atkinson, Senior Executive Officer, National Physical Laboratory, Department of Scientific and Industrial Research.
- William Atkinson, DCM, MM, BEM, Electrical Engineer, War Office.
- Ronald Atwell, Higher Executive Officer, Home Office.
- Annie Dorothy Austin. For political and public services in Derbyshire.
- James Baillie, General Secretary, Ice Cream Alliance.
- Albert Vincent Bannister, Senior Vehicle Examiner, Metropolitan Traffic Area, Ministry of Transport.
- Raymond Kingsley Barlow, Chief Officer, Bootle Fire Brigade.
- George Sweeney Barry, Secretary, London Provision Exchange Ltd.
- Everest Leslie Bell, Tariffs Regulations Superintendent, British European Airways.
- John Bell, Area Organiser, No. 2 Area, (North Eastern District), United Pattern-makers' Association.
- Noel Berryman, Chief National Savings Liaison Officer for the Electricity Supply Industry.
- George Betts, Works Director, Blount & Co. Ltd., Belper, Derbyshire.
- Frederic Lionel Billows, Education Officer, British Council, Madras, India.
- Mary Gertrude Bird, Headmistress, St. Hilda's Approved School, Newcastle-upon-Tyne.
- Agnes Bonnington, Grade 4 Officer, Ministry of Labour.
- Frederick James Bosworth, Member, Essex Agricultural Executive Committee.
- Francis James Bould, Design Organiser, Television, British Broadcasting Corporation.
- David Arthian Bowen, Chief Superintendent, Metropolitan Police Force.
- Joseph Herbert Brooks, TD, Superintendent of Engineering Workshops, University of Cambridge.
- Edward Brown, Chief Photographer, Air Ministry.
- Sidney Riley Brown, Signals Officer, Ministry of Aviation.
- Ernest Browning, Senior Experimental Officer, British Museum (Natural History).
- Nellie Kate Simpson Bruce, lately Teacher, North Primary School, Wick.
- William Bulloch, JP, Works Director, Cruikshank & Co. Ltd., Denny, Stirlingshire.
- William Walter Bunnage, Executive Officer, Ministry of Works.
- Eric William Burden, Finance Officer, Territorial and Auxiliary Forces Association, County of Warwick.
- Winifred Mary Burkitt, BEM, JP, Chairman, East Midland Regional Street and Village Groups Savings Advisory Committee.
- Rachel Edith Florence Bushell, County Borough Organiser, Canterbury, Women's Voluntary Services.
- William Henry Butcher, JP, Chairman of Committee, No. 372 (Barry) Squadron, Air Training Corps.
- Lieutenant-Commander Kenneth Bernard Calkin, Special Branch Intelligence Liaison Officer, London Flotilla, Royal Naval Volunteer (Supplementary) Reserve.
- Jessie Cameron, Honorary President, Women's Section, Crieff British Legion.
- Catherine Ann Campbell, lately Higher Executive Officer, Board of Trade.
- Leonard Campbell, Deputy Principal Officer, Ministry of Labour and National Insurance for Northern Ireland.
- William John Campbell, Assistant Secretary, National Farmers' Union of Scotland.
- Alfred George Whicheloe Cannon, Divisional Manufacturing Manager, Associated Electrical Industries Ltd., Rugby.
- Irene Edith Mary Carpenter, Senior Executive Officer, Ministry of Agriculture, Fisheries and Food.
- Arthur Adam Carter, lately Senior Executive Officer, Scottish Record Office.
- Maurice Bramham Cauthery, Secretary, Wool Industry Bureau of Statistics.
- Frederick Norman Chadwick, Higher Executive Officer, London Communications-Electronics Agency.
- Reginald Wilfred Chandler, Chief Telecommunications Superintendent, General Post Office.
- Hannah Christmas, lately Supervisor of Midwives and Home Nurses, Glamorgan County Council (Aberdare and Mountain Ash Division).
- Sidney Clark. For political services in Lincolnshire.
- Ernest Redvers Cliff, Higher Executive Officer, Ministry of Education.
- John Cliff, Honorary Secretary and Treasurer, Preston Sea Cadet Corps Unit.
- William Robert Collin, Assistant District Auditor, Ministry of Housing and Local Government.
- Lydia Cook, JP. For public services in Rothwell, Leeds.
- Reginald Henry Cook, Clerical Officer, Government Communications Headquarters.
- Sidney Arthur Cooke. For political services.
- Charles Barnard Cooper, lately Chief Clerk, Supreme Court Taxing Office, Supreme Court of Judicature.
- William James Crawford, Surveyor, Glasgow, Board of Customs and Excise.
- John Vincent Cross, Mechanical and Electrical Engineer, Air Ministry Directorate-General of Works, London Airport.
- Angela Cunningham, Sister Superintendent, Casualty Department, General Hospital, Birmingham.
- James Gerallt Daniels, MC, Headmaster, Llanllwni Primary School, Pencader, Carmarthenshire.
- James Darkins, lately Ship's Husband, Northern Trawlers Ltd., Grimsby.
- Arthur John Davies, Surveyor and Water Engineer, Haverfordwest Rural District Council.
- Muriel Davis. For political and public services in Northumberland.
- Sidney Arthur William Davis, Higher Executive Officer, Commonwealth Relations Office.
- Frederick George Dawes, Secretary, Brighton and Lewes Group Hospital Management Committee.
- James Patrick St. George Dear. For services to tennis and rackets.
- The Reverend Frederick Hugh Palliser Clermont de Costobadie, lately Officiating Chaplain, Royal Air Force, Rufforth.
- Charlotte Isabel Denholm. For political and public services in Stirling.
- Robert Dew, Higher Executive Officer, Board of Inland Revenue.
- Albert James Dougan, Secretary, Ulster Industries Development Association.
- Alec Draper, Vice-Principal, Rugby College of Engineering Technology.
- Harry Duprose Drummond, lately Drainage Engineer, Bristol County Borough Council.
- Elizabeth Gilkison Barr Duff. For services to the British Legion in Scotland.
- Anne Aitken Dunbar, Civil Defence Organiser, Western District of Scotland, Women's Voluntary Services.
- Harold Edwin Duncombe. For political services in Acton.
- Herbert Victor Eades, Inspector of Taxes, Board of Inland Revenue.
- James Easson, Superintendent of Music, Dundee Schools.
- Thomas Eden, Senior Executive Officer, National Assistance Board.
- Kathleen Constance Edwards, Member, London Regional Staff, Women's Voluntary Services.
- Olwyn Maud Edwards, Personnel Manager, Radio & Allied Industries Ltd.
- Margaret Elliot, Headmistress, Blakiston County Infants' School, Fleetwood.
- Richard Charles Elliott, BEM, Chief Fire and Ambulance Officer, Burton-on-Trent.
- John Humphrey Evans, Headmaster, Ellerslie Junior School, Shepherds Bush.
- John Jones Evans, Member, Carmarthen County Agricultural Executive Committee.
- Leonard Evans, Senior Executive Officer, Air Ministry.
- Phyllis Myfanwy Evans, Controller of Typists, Ministry of Aviation.
- Constance Lily Farrar, Chairman, Dolgellau Savings Committee, Merionethshire.
- James Ferguson, MM, JP, Chairman, Kidderminster and District Disablement Advisory Committee.
- Andrew John Fiskin, Higher Executive Officer, Edinburgh, General Post Office.
- Alick Howard Fortnam, Member, Executive Committee, Land Settlement Association Ltd., Newent, Gloucestershire.
- Florence Fountain, Member, Leeds, Harrogate and District War Pensions Committee.
- Leslie George Fowell, Executive Engineer and General Manager, Pye Ltd., West Drayton, Middlesex.
- William Fraser, Vice-chairman, Highlands and Islands District Advisory Committee, Scottish Board for Industry.
- George Edward Graham Gadsden, DSO, TD. For services to the Anglo-Egyptian Resettlement Board.
- Reginald William Gale, lately Technical Adjutant (Technical Grade I), No. 25 Maintenance Unit, Royal Air Force, Hartlebury.
- William James Gardner, Honorary Secretary, Artisan Golfers' Association.
- David Duke Gibb, Senior Executive Officer, Ministry of Pensions and National Insurance.
- James Gibbin, Public Relations Officer, North Eastern Region, General Post Office.
- Evelyn Gilfillan, County Borough Organiser, Barnsley, Women's Voluntary Services.
- Eric Robert Wilfred Gillmor, Chief Warden, Civil Defence Corps, Reading.
- Cornelius Harold Gilpin, Higher Executive Officer, Ministry of Pensions and National Insurance.
- Joseph Henry Goddard, Grade 4 Officer, Branch B, Foreign Office.
- William George Nathaniel Gorfin, MM, Editor, Exmouth Journal, Devon.
- Captain William James Thomas Gosden, Harbour Master and Traffic Superintendent, Greenock Harbour Trust.
- May Grant, Proof Reader, Royal National Institute for the Blind.
- Thomas Grills, JP, Chairman, Newry and District Local Savings Committee, County Down.
- Frederick William Hall, Member, Middlesex Agricultural Executive Committee.
- James Wilfred Elliot Hall, Director of Music, Blundell's School, Tiverton, Devon.
- Maurice Henry Hall, Engineer-in-Charge, Television Studios, British Broadcasting Corporation.
- Thomas Ernest Hall, Higher Executive Officer, Ministry of Pensions and National Insurance.
- Eva Gladys Halliday. For political and public services in the West Riding of Yorkshire.
- John Hamilton, Executive Officer, Civil Assistant II, Royal Navy Aircraft Yard, Donibristle, Fife.
- Mildred Agnes May Hammond, Chief Superintendent of Typists, HM Treasury.
- William George Handley, Senior Executive Officer, Board of Trade.
- Frederick Charles Hanney, Superintendent, Nursing and Physiotherapy Clinic, Sir Oswald Stoll Foundation.
- James Bryson Hardie, Honorary Secretary, Wm. Thomson & Co. (Kinning Park) Ltd., Glasgow, Savings Group.
- Lewis Harper, Chief Superintendent, Manchester City Police Force.
- John Frederick Harris, lately Clerical Officer, Ministry of Transport and Civil Aviation.
- Edith Emma Paige Harrison, Honorary Secretary, Hull and District Schools Savings Sub-Committee.
- Walter Parker Harrison, MRCS, LRCP, Member, Lincoln National Service Medical Board.
- Edith Winifred Hatfield, Clerical Officer, Export Credits Guarantee Department.
- Beatrix Havergal, Principal, Waterperry Horticultural School, Wheatley.
- Edgar Ashton Hebron. For political and public services in Bebington.
- Agnes Sillars Heron. For political services in Scotland.
- Donald Angelo Hewetson, Telecommunications Technical Officer, Grade I, Ronaldsway Airport, Isle of Man.
- Harold Hill, Higher Executive Officer, Ministry of Pensions and National Insurance.
- Elizabeth Temperance Primrose Hockey, JP. For political and public services in Monmouthshire.
- Edward John Hocking, Electrical Manager, Vosper Ltd., Portsmouth.
- William Hickton Home, JP, County Chairman, West Lancashire, and Member, National Executive Council, British Legion.
- Cyril Edgar. Horton, Senior Executive Officer, General Register Office.
- Gilbert How, Regional Collector, Board of Inland Revenue.
- Arthur Huckle, Senior Executive Officer, Admiralty.
- Molly Horrocks Hudson, Matron, Royal Belfast Hospital for Sick Children.
- Susannah Hughes, District Superintendent, Ranyard Nurses, London.
- William Howard Hughes, Assistant Chief Financial Officer, South of Scotland Electricity Board.
- Robert Dalglish Hunter, JP, Town Clerk, Cumnock, Ayrshire.
- Margaret Amy Hutchins, JP, Chairman, Women's Sub-Committee, Brighton, Hove and District Local Employment Committee.
- John Taylor Imrie, Drawing Office Consultant, The Fairfield Shipbuilding & Engineering Co. Ltd., Glasgow.
- William Emlyn James, Director of Productions, Swansea Welsh (Language) Drama Festival.
- William George Jehan, Road Safety Officer, Joint Road Safety Committee, Preston, Fulwood and Walton-le-Dale.
- Alderman Thomas Harry Johnson. For political and public services in Bedfordshire.
- Elza Mary Jones, Senior Executive Officer, Ministry of Pensions and National Insurance.
- Georgina Garnham Jones, Assistant Matron, Shirlett Sanatorium, Brosely, Shropshire.
- Glyndwr Edwards-Jones, Superintendent and Deputy Chief Constable, Denbighshire Constabulary.
- John Victor Jones, Chief Information Officer, B.P. Refinery (Kent) Ltd.
- Robert Jones. For public services in County Down.
- Norman Robert Kay, Area Superintendent, Manchester and Salford Area, Duke of Lancaster's District, St. John Ambulance Brigade.
- John Keane, Technical Officer, East Anglian District, War Office.
- Agnes Gertrude Keeping. For political and public services in Surrey.
- Georgina Kelly. For political services in Glasgow.
- Captain John Kemp, Master, MS Eastbank, Andrew Weir & Co. Ltd., London.
- David Argyle Wilson Kerr, Chief Superintendent and Deputy Chief Constable, Lothians and Peebles Constabulary.
- Stanley Travis Kershaw, JP, Actuary, Hull Savings Bank.
- John Haddon Kirk, Executive Engineer, General Post Office.
- John Arthur Knight. For political services in Middlesex.
- Richard Edward Knowles, Senior Engineer Surveyor, Ministry of Transport.
- David Arthur Kyle, Deputy Principal, Ministry of Education for Northern Ireland.
- Ernest Stanley Lamb, Higher Executive Officer, Ministry of Education.
- Percy William Lampard, Executive Officer, Southern Command, War Office.
- Geoffrey Roy Landale, District Inspector, Royal Ulster Constabulary.
- Beatrice Mary Langton, Superintendent Health Visitor, Salford County Borough.
- Nora Kathleen Langtry-Langton, Superintendent, Cumberlow Lodge Remand Home for Girls.
- Margaret Mary Lavelle, Probation Officer, Ayrshire.
- Mary Sinclair Lawrenson, County Borough Organiser, South Shields, Women's Voluntary Services.
- Greta Lempriere, Senior Executive Officer, Foreign Office.
- John Bernard Leyland, lately Joint Intelligence Bureau, Officer, Grade II, Ministry of Defence.
- Percy Edward James Lincroft, Secretary and Registrar, Chartered Institute of Patent Agents.
- Herbert Lloyd, Black Knight Project Officer, Saunders-Roe Ltd.
- The Reverend Walter Edwin Longney, Honorary Chaplain, King Edward VII Convalescent Home for Officers, Osborne, Isle of Wight.
- Ernest Edward Loose, Chairman, Alderley Edge Savings Committee.
- John Rodgers Lowe, Clerical Officer, Royal Ordnance Factory, Barnbow, Leeds.
- Margaret Agatha Rawson Lumby, lately Secretary, Institutional Management Association.
- Maude Evelyn Pierrepont Miramar McBarnet, Attached War Office.
- Alice Mary McCall, Restaurant and Welfare Superintendent, Gloucester District, South West Region, Navy, Army and Air Force Institutes.
- William McCartney, Secretary, Federation of Civil Engineering Contractors (Scottish Section).
- Charles Macdonald, Director and General Contracts Manager, Wailes Dove Bitumastic Ltd.
- Gordon McKendrick, Secretary to the Lord Mayor of Newcastle upon Tyne.
- May Garroway McQueen, Emergency Feeding and Civil Defence Specialist, Western District of Scotland, Women's Voluntary Services.
- John Smith Magnay, JP. For political and public services in Gateshead.
- Elizabeth Mary Major, Superintendent Midwife, The London Hospital.
- Charles Harold Mapp, Executive Office, Ministry of Defence.
- Edith Markham, Headmistress, Junior Department, Uplands County Primary School, Bexleyheath, Kent.
- John Arthur Marshall, Information Officer, Admiralty.
- William James Marshall, Senior Executive Engineer, Engineer-in-Chiefs Office, General Post Office.
- Reginald Charles Martin, Non-Technical Stores Class, Grade I, War Office.
- Robert Butt Martin, Councillor, Stroud Rural District Council.
- Robert Matheson, MC, Civil Defence Officer, Plymouth.
- Stanley Vivian Thomas May, Regional Secretary, National Federation of Building Trades Operatives, North West Region.
- Dorothy Gertrude Mellis. For political and public services in the Wirral.
- Joseph Crosland Mellor. For public services in the West Riding of Yorkshire.
- Eric Michelmore, MC, Deputy Regional Director, United Kingdom Region, Imperial War Graves Commission.
- Alfred Donald Miller, General Secretary, Mission to Lepers.
- Hugh Milne, Chief Engineer, MV Athelcrest, Athel Line Ltd., London.
- Leslie Douglas Milne, JP. For political and public services in Staffordshire.
- Anne Mitchell, Group Labour Manager, Risley, United Kingdom Atomic Energy Authority.
- Robert Thomas Moore, Alderman, Chairman, Andover District Committee, Hampshire Agricultural Executive Committee.
- Glyndwr Morris, Grade 3 Officer, Ministry of Labour.
- Captain Arthur Samuel Mosley, Master, SS Cliff Quay, Central Electricity Generating Board.
- Percy William Alexander Monday, Senior Executive Officer, Passport Office, Liverpool.
- Thomas Alfred Munn, Grade 4 Officer, Ministry of Labour.
- William Murray, MM, Head Forester, Forestry Commission, Scotland.
- Frederick James Nawn. For services to the Boy Scout Association in County Fermanagh.
- Samuel Nelson, Head Postmaster, Londonderry, General Post Office.
- Douglas Wright Newport, Clerk of the Stratford-on-Avon Rural District Council.
- Daphne Isabel Nisbett, Assistant, Music Bookings, British Broadcasting Corporation.
- Alderman Myee Maplesden Noakes. For political and public services in Kent.
- John Henry Lane-Nott, Civil Defence Officer, Steel Company of Wales Ltd. (Newport Division).
- Arthur Orton, Chief Ambulance Officer, Liverpool.
- Raymond John Osborne, Assistant Postmaster, Colchester.
- Kathleen Mary O'Shea, Superintendent of Typists, Home Office.
- William Osliffe, lately Manager, Roller Cutting and Engraving Department, Jas. Williamson & Son Ltd.
- Andrew Pace, Senior Collector, Board of Inland Revenue.
- Edwin George Paice, Experimental Officer, The Royal Military College of Science.
- Michael Dixon Parkinson, Head of Estimating Department, T. W. Greenwell & Co. Ltd., Sunderland.
- Irene Glare Parsons, Assistant Branch Director, Oxfordshire, British Red Cross Society.
- Amy Lorna Dolben Paul, Librarian, Army Library, Cyprus.
- Florence Muriel Paxman, President, Colchester Society for the Blind.
- Norman Gerald Payne, Engineer-in-Charge, Independent Television Authority Transmitting Station, Hints, Tamworth, Staffordshire.
- Emmeline Violet May Penney, Clerical Officer, Colonial Office.
- Percy Mafeking Pennyfather, Senior Executive Officer, Board of Trade.
- Norman Buchanan Pettersen, Honorary Secretary, Coventry Productivity Association.
- Elizabeth Maude Petty. For political and public services in Lancaster.
- Tom Joshua Phillips, Secretary, Jewish Board of Guardians.
- William George Durban Phillips, Senior Executive Officer, Ministry of Power.
- Daisy Philp. For political and public services in Argyll.
- Helen Sheila Pickstone, Area Officer, Sheffield, British Council.
- Edward Piercy, Inspector, Aeronautical Inspection Service, No. 28 Maintenance Unit, Royal Air Force, Harpur Hill.
- Amy Pollitt, County Borough Organiser, Manchester, Women's Voluntary Services.
- Charles George Powell, Chairman, Metropolitan Area Council, British Legion.
- Thomas Baden Powell, Senior 1 Executive Officer, Ministry of Aviation.
- Walter John Powles, Liaison Skipper, with the Fishery Protection Squadron.
- George Henry Prince, Head of Apparatus Engineering Department, Ericsson Telephones Ltd., Nottingham.
- William George Edward Quick, Higher Executive Officer, Ministry of Agriculture, Fisheries and Food.
- Reuben Redstone, Senior Scientific Officer, Admiralty.
- William Thomas Reeve, Assistant Regional Controller, National Assistance Board.
- Raymond Renwick, DCM, Chairman, Otley Disablement Advisory Committee.
- Frederick Charles Revelle, GM, Assistant Chief Officer, Bristol Fire Brigade.
- Frank Marshall Reynolds, Senior Surveyor, Air Registration Board.
- Alderman Ada Rhodes. For public services in Bacup, Lancashire.
- James Richardson, Secretary, Scottish Association of Friendly Societies.
- Margaret Elizabeth Ridgway, Ward Sister, St. James's Hospital, Balham.
- Stanley Arthur Edwin Riley, Bass, British Broadcasting Corporation Singers.
- John Ringland, Assistant Manager, Electrical Department, Harland & Wolff Ltd., Belfast.
- Robert Roberts, JP, Alderman, Anglesey County Council.
- Leslie George Robinson, Senior Executive Officer, HM Stationery Office.
- Richard Llewellyn Lloyd Robinson, Regional Fuel'Engineer, National Industrial Fuel Efficiency Service.
- David Rodger, Manager, Marine Department, Vickers Armstrongs (Engineers) Ltd., Barrow-in-Furness.
- Observer Commander Frank Rodgers, Group Commandant, No. 15 Group, Royal Observer Corps.
- Nellie Alice Rooke, Office Registrar, Royal National Lifeboat Institution.
- Ernest Robert Kenneth Rumsey, Assistant General Manager, The British Bata Shoe Co. Ltd., East Tilbury, Essex.
- Constance Maude Ruscoe, Grade 4 Officer, Branch B, Foreign Office.
- Blanche Russell, Personal Assistant to the Secretary of Antrim County Council.
- William James Rutter, Grade 4 Officer, Ministry of Labour.
- James Sanders, JP, Vice-chairman, Portsmouth District Advisory Committee, Southern Regional Board for Industry.
- Charles Howe Saunders, Commandant, No. 2 District Police Training Centre, Northallerton, Yorkshire.
- George Thomas Saunders, Deputy Headmaster, Ashmead County Secondary Boys School, Reading.
- Vera Mabel Savile. For political and public services in Bristol.
- Marie-Henriette Schilling, Head of Services Welfare Department, Women's Voluntary Services.
- Percy Charles Shaw, Chief Electrical Engineer, MS Dominion Monarch, Shaw, Savill & Albion Co. Ltd., London.
- George James Sheriff, Chief Managing Clerk, Solicitor's Department, Metropolitan Police Office.
- John Peter Leslie Shewan, Executive Officer, Ministry of Pensions and National Insurance.
- Lieutenant-Colonel Arthur Walter Shirley, TD. For political services.
- John Clark Shoobridge, Chairman, Dorset War Pensions Committee.
- Alexandra May Simcock, Headmistress, Moss House Secondary School, Manchester.
- Donald Lawry Simmons, Inspector of Air Raid Warnings, Metropolitan Sector, United Kingdom Warning Organisation.
- John Harry Walrond Simmons, Senior Principal Scientist, Atomic Energy Research Establishment, Harwell.
- George Smith, District Signal Assistant, York, North Eastern Region, British Railways.
- Thomas Arthur Smith, JP, Official of the Amalgamated Union of Building Trade Workers.
- George Ernest Smithson, Higher Executive Officer, Command Ordnance Deport, War Office, Branston.
- Thomas Arthur Sawyer-Snelling, Line Maintenance Manager, Mideast Aircraft Service Co. (Associated Company of British Overseas Airways Corporation).
- George Helland Sommerfield, Vice-President, Scottish Schools Athletic Association.
- Ernest Edmund Sopp, Officer in Charge, Central Drawing Office, Ministry of Power.
- Eric Morley Spafford, Senior Executive Officer, Ministry of Pensions and National Insurance.
- Louisa Maud Sparrow. For political and public services in Finsbury.
- Winifred Mary Springford, Principal Secretary to the Chairman, Imperial Chemical Industries Ltd.
- Arthur Howard Squire, Registrar of Births and Deaths, Wrexham, Denbighshire.
- Charles Reuben Squire, JP, District Secretary, Oxford, Amalgamated Engineering Union.
- Donald William MacBride Staples, Divisional Officer, Essex Fire Brigade.
- Basil Walter Stearn, VRD, Higher Executive Officer, Air Ministry.
- Edward Pedder Stears, Senior Executive Officer, Board of Trade.
- Reginald John Steel, Inspector of Taxes (Higher Grade), Board of Inland Revenue.
- Lewis Stenning, Assistant Curator, Royal Botanic Gardens, Kew.
- Alfred Edwin Stigwood, Chairman, Forest of Dean Youth Employment Committee.
- Gilbert Arthur Streeter, MC, JP, Chairman of Committee, No. 1254 (Godalming) Squadron, Air Training Corps.
- Percy George Lionel Strong, Member, National Savings Assembly, representing West Sussex.
- Ernest Charles Joseph Stuchbery, Works Manager, Mechanism Ltd., Croydon.
- Kenneth Sutherland, Chief Preventive Officer, Board of Customs and Excise.
- William Sutherland, lately Honorary Secretary, Eastern (Falkirk and District) Division, Stirlingshire Branch, Soldiers', Sailors' and Airmen's Families Association.
- Hilda Swindells, Chief Home Service Adviser, North Western Gas Board.
- Isabel Florence Tacon, Higher Executive Officer, Commonwealth Relations Office.
- Harry Tate, Grade 3 Officer, Ministry of Labour.
- Cyril Joseph Taylor, Superintendent Welfare Officer, Public Health Department, Norfolk County Council.
- Sidney Taylor, lately Experimental Officer, Ministry of Agriculture, Fisheries and Food.
- Abraham Tegerdine. For political services in Northumberland.
- Edgar Baden Thomas, Higher Executive Officer, Ministry of Housing and Local Government.
- Cyril Thompson, lately Grade 3 Officer, Ministry of Labour and National Service.
- Joseph Alfred Thompson, DCM, Manager, Hylton Colliery, Durham Division, National Coal Board.
- Albert Edward Thorne, Honorary Secretary, 13th (S) Battalion Old Comrades Association, The Rifle Brigade.
- Ernest Albert William Thurley, Senior Executive Officer, Ministry of Pensions and National Insurance.
- Eric Austin Townsend, Executive Officer, Ministry of Agriculture, Fisheries and Food.
- Thomas Turnbull, BEM, Civil Defence Officer, Dunfermline.
- Eric Turner, Engineer III, Royal Ordnance Factory, Nottingham.
- William Werge Vasey, TD. For services to the Combined Cadet Force, Skinners' School.
- Captain Frederick Hildyard Hawkins Stuart Verschoyle, Information Officer, War Office.
- Charles William Wale. For political and public services in Southgate.
- Jean Mitchell Wallace, Senior Dairy and Poultry Adviser, South Region, West of Scotland Agricultural College.
- Dennis Murray Walters. For political services.
- Sidney Thomas Walters, Victualling Store Officer, Admiralty.
- Alexander Powell Watson, Higher Technical "B", Ministry of Works.
- James Watters. For services to ex-servicemen and their dependents in Perthshire.
- Cecil George Weaver, Chief Executive Officer, Department of Health for Scotland.
- Frederick Vernon Weller. For political and public services in Solihull.
- William Edwin Westgarth, Chairman and Assembly Member, Durham West Constituency National Savings Committee.
- James Bertram Whalley, General Secretary, The National Federation of Meat Traders' Associations.
- Marjorie Wheatley, Honorary Secretary, and Local Representative, Wimbledon Division, Soldiers', Sailors' and Airmen's Families Association.
- Gladys Elizabeth White. For political and public services in Dunbartonshire.
- Ella Whyte, Honorary Secretary, Kinlochleven School and Kinlochleven Women's Service Voluntary Services Savings Groups.
- Alexander Hugh Williams, Technical Grade I, Royal Small Arms Factory, Enfield, Middlesex.
- Charles John Williams, lately Higher Executive Officer, War Office.
- Margaret Blanche Williams. For services to the Young Women's Christian Association, Cardiff.
- William Edgar Williams, Principal Assistant to the Secretary, Bristol Channel Ship-Repairers' Association.
- John Wilson, Assistant Inspector of Naval Ordnance, Admiralty.
- Richard Frank Wilson, Clerk of the Tyldesley Urban District Council.
- George Humphrey Winn, Airport Manager, Blackbushe, Camberley.
- Christopher John Woodbridge, Senior Architect, Ministry of Works.
- Norman Whitaker Wright, Managing Director, W. & J. Tod Ltd., Boatbuilders, Ferrybridge, Dorset.
- Thomas Alfred Yates, Electrical Engineer, Admiralty.
- Amy Elizabeth Yeo. For political and public services in Hitchin.
- Alfred Warren Young, Chairman, Tottenham, Edmonton and Enfield War Pensions Committee.
- Sidney John Aspden, lately Commercial Officer, Political Agency, Kuwait.
- Ralph Frederick Banfield, British Governor, Spandau Prison, and British Resident, British Military Government, Berlin.
- Barbara Esther Barrett, Shorthand-typist, Office of the United Kingdom Commissioner for Singapore and South-East Asia, Singapore.
- Jean Alexandra Chambers, British subject resident in Chile.
- George Edward Chapman, lately Manager, Gray, Mackenzie & Co. Ltd., Muscat.
- Catherine Brady Dowds, Archivist, Political Agency, Kuwait.
- John Archibald Fenton, British subject resident in France.
- James Henry Forrest, Technical Manager, Kuwait Airport.
- George Dimitrieus Gerakis, Assistant Administration Officer, Her Majesty's Embassy, Athens.
- Kenneth Booth Gibson, lately Second Secretary (Commercial), Her Majesty's Embassy, Saigon.
- John Drinan Goodwin, Transport Supervisor, Her Majesty's Embassy, Tokyo.
- Winifred Marion Goy, British Pro-Consul, Houston.
- Walter Butler Clough Grant, MC, British Vice-Consul, Cordoba.
- Frances Mary Hancox, Medical Missionary in Colombia.
- Henry Russell Henshaw, Her Majesty's Consul, Norfolk, Virginia.
- Frank Bateman Hill, British Vice-Consul, Maracaibo.
- Sheridan Knowles, Senior Executive Officer, United Kingdom Treasury and Supply Delegation, Washington.
- Frank Dominic Marquez, British Consul, Salvador (Bahia).
- Louise Mountain, British subject resident in the United States of America.
- Walter Harold George Popplestone, Director, British Council Centre, Tabriz.
- Frederick Clive Robinson, British Council Functional Officer, Poland.
- Jolis Robinson, Clerical Officer, Her Majesty's Embassy, Vientiane.
- Emma May Staite, lately Archivist, Her Majesty's Consulate-General, Geneva.
- Ronald Frank George Taylor, British Vice-Consul, Stockholm.
- Elizabeth Margaret Warren, lately Archivist, Her Majesty's Embassy, Bonn.
- Alison Marjorie Ashby. For services to the National Trust and Museum of the State of South Australia.
- William Baldock, Bandmaster, Unley Salvation Army Citadel Band, State of South Australia.
- Gladys Minnie Beaumont. For social welfare services in Basutoland.
- Frederick Lee Bloomfield. For services to social welfare and charitable movements in the State of Victoria.
- Elsie Bolam, a Nursing Sister, Marysville, State of Victoria.
- Lilian Marion Bourne, of Umtali, Southern Rhodesia. For social welfare services.
- Muriel Brackstone, Honorary Secretary of the Women's Council of the State of Victoria, Returned Soldiers League Women's Auxiliary.
- Sydney Alfred Bryant, Industrial Officer at Kariba, Labour Department, Southern Rhodesia.
- Richard Maynard Dudley Buxton, Superintendent of Police, Federation of Malaya.
- James Joseph Cavanagh, of Quirindi, State of New South Wales. For services to the community.
- Ernest Plewman de Kock. For public services, especially in connection with the protection of wild life, in Southern Rhodesia.
- Howard Orr Dick, of Booval, State of Queensland. For services to ex-servicemen and their dependants.
- Rupert Bellamy Fothergill, Senior Game Ranger in Charge at Kariba, Department of Game, Southern Rhodesia.
- Ludwig Glauert, an authority on Natural History matters of the State of Western Australia.
- Frank Green, of Geraldton, State of Western Australia; in recognition of his contribution to the development of the district.
- Cecil Arthur Grimley, Insurance Commissioner, Government Insurance Office, State of Queensland.
- Daphne Lorraine Gum, Director of Ashford House School for Cerebral Palsy Children, State of South Australia.
- Una Florence Genevieve Hammond, of Tarings, State of Queensland. For social welfare service on behalf of women and girls.
- Harold Hosier, Brigadier, Salvation Army, State of Queensland.
- Nancy John. For voluntary services inconnection with the welfare of the Deaf in the State of Victoria.
- Roy Russell-Jones, Superintendent of Police, Federation of Malaya.
- Koodibetse Mokgabisi Kgopo, District Officer, Bechuanaland Protectorate.
- Albert Henry Tottenham Kneen, Drill Superintendent, Public Works Departments, Bechuanaland Protectorate.
- Romeo Lahey, President, National Parks Association, State of Queensland.
- Agnes Mary Lions. For services to Nursing in the State of New South Wales.
- Bernard Frank Matthews. For services to the United Kingdom community in India.
- Stella Cecilia Monk, Director of the Commonwealth Day Movement.
- Thomas Henry Mooney, Superintendent of Police, Federation of Malaya.
- Aubrey Frederick Carlile Murphy, Mayor of the City of the Blue Mountains, State of New South Wales.
- Elizabeth Jane Murphy. For social welfare services in the State of New South Wales.
- Ralph Neate. For public services, particularly on behalf of ex-servicemen suffering from tuberculosis, in the State of South Australia.
- Mary Stewart Niblock, formerly Secretary of the Country Women's Association, State of Western Australia.
- Florence Maud Nordon. For services rendered under the auspices of the Over-Seas League in connection with hospitality to Commonwealth visitors.
- Brian Lucien O'Leary, Legal Secretary, Basutoland.
- Kenneth Nelson Paulin. For services to the United Kingdom community in the Ahmedabad area, India.
- Robert Maxwell Taberer Phillips, Surveyor, Public Works Department, Basutoland.
- William Betts Richardson, of Wangaratta, State of Victoria. For public services.
- Wilfred Allan Rose, JP, Warden of the Scottsdale Municipality, State of Tasmania.
- The Reverend Canon Lea Leonard Sagonda, of the Diocese of Matabeleland, Southern Rhodesia.
- Jessie Isabella Smith, Matron (Grade I) of the General Hospital, Penang, Federation of Malaya.
- Mary Agnes Irving Smith, of Setukwe, Southern Rhodesia. For social welfare services.
- Duncan Fulton Thompson, of Toowoomba, State of Queensland. For services to the community in the field of Sport.
- John Thomas Thompson, Chief Superintendent (Quartermaster), British South Africa Police, Southern Rhodesia.
- Marshall Gordon Tweedie, President, Box Hill Horticultural Society, State of Victoria.
- Milicent Isabel Watchorn. For philanthropic services in the State of Tasmania.
- Julia Liliah Wigley, of Bulawayo, Southern Rhodesia. For social welfare services.
- Harold Wiles. For services, to the rural community of the South Coast area, State of New South Wales.
- Langley Murray Williams, a civil engineer in the Public Works Department, Federation of Malaya.
- John Gybney Winfield, Chairman, Eacham Shire Council, Malanda, State of Queensland.
- Louis Rene Abel, Finance Officer, Grade I, Mauritius.
- Clarence Frederick Ackbarali Adam, Examiner of Accounts, Grade I, Audit Department, Trinidad.
- Claude Hamilton Adams. For public services in Kenya.
- John Okafor Adingupu, Superintendent of Prisons, Federation of Nigeria.
- Amir Afzal, lately Assistant Superintendent, East African Posts and Telecommunications Administration, East Africa High Commission.
- Alkali Agaie, Senior Agricultural Assistant, Northern Region, Nigeria.
- Philip Akinyede, Chief Asamo of Ado-Ekiti, Western Region, Nigeria.
- Thompson Prince Akpabio, Higher Executive Officer, Ministry of Health, Federation of Nigeria.
- Hans Nelson Alagoa, Inspector/Instructor, Her Majesty's Customs and Excise, Federation of Nigeria.
- Lieutenant-Colonel Geoffrey Morris Allen, Secretary, Royal Agricultural Society of Kenya.
- John Chukwuma Anyansi. For public services in the Eastern Region, Nigeria.
- Mabel Evelyn Bates, lately Personal Secretary, Grade I, Administrator's Office, East Africa High Commission.
- Richard Hamilton Bayley, Superintendent, Government Printing Office, St. Lucia, Windward Islands.
- Timothy Byabusukuzi Bazarrabusa. For public services in Uganda.
- John Beattie. For public services in the Federation of Nigeria.
- John Dennis Boles, Administrative Officer, North Borneo.
- Edwin Arthur Hewlett Bolton, Executive Officer, Crown Agents for Oversea Governments and Administrations.
- Joan Catherine Mary Bowen, Superintendent of Education for Women and Girls, Zanzibar.
- Ronald Ernest Brown, Master (Physical Education), Education Department, Cyprus.
- Lieutenant-Colonel Michael Douglas Burns, lately Senior Technical Assistant, Ministry of Transport and Works, Northern Rhodesia.
- Captain Henry Ernest Arthur Callaby, Civil Defence Instructor, Malta.
- Victor Charles, Supervising Public Health Inspector, Trinidad.
- Chung Wing Kwong, Chief Health Inspector, Hong Kong.
- Vivian Albert Golley, Principal, Soroti Technical School, Uganda.
- Horatio Anthony Fionn Darby, Manager, Electricity, Ice and Cold Storage Department, Montserrat Government, Leeward Islands.
- Jamietram Krishnaram Dave, LCP&S. For public services in Tanganyika.
- Francis Anthony De Souza, Accounts Officer, Chief Secretary's Office, Kenya.
- Alan Dickinson, Administrative Officer, Nyasaland.
- Joseph Raymond Duverge, Secretary, Public Service Commission, Mauritius.
- Alfred Jarrett Elphick, Government Printer, Fiji.
- Henry Clifton Fairweather, Director of Housing and Planning, British Honduras.
- Gabriel Ngugi Gathendu, Acting Information Officer, Grade I, Kenya.
- Cecil James George, Postmaster, St. Helena.
- Robert John Mills Gillies, Veterinary Officer, Northern Rhodesia.
- Marjory Ann Grant, Matron, Class I, Queen Mary Hospital, Hong Kong.
- Albert George Hamer, Representative, British Council, Nyasaland.
- Luke Hannon, Assistant Chief Constable, Cyprus.
- William Alfred Conrad Hortor, MRCS, LRCP. For public services in Jamaica.
- Paul Amalumchukwu Ifenu, lately Inspector of Works (Mechanical), Eastern Region, Nigeria.
- Odedolapo Ilori, The Odofun of Ijanye, Western Region, Nigeria.
- Augustus Emmanuel Theodore Imbert, Director of Passbooks, Kenya.
- David Reginald Estcourt Jackson, Principal Research Officer, Eastern Region, Nigeria.
- Horatio Alphonso Ralph James. For public services in Sierra Leone.
- Isabel Haugh Jamieson, Matron, Grade II, Uganda.
- Mary Knowles. For public services in Nyasaland.
- Kwan Man Wai. For public services in Hong Kong.
- Arthur Lake. For public services in St. Kitts, Leeward Islands.
- Percival Scott Leathart, lately Deputy Superintendent of Police, Singapore.
- Arthur Herbert Lewis. For cultural services in Northern Rhodesia.
- Lo Cho Chi, General Clerical Service, Special Class, No. 8, Hong Kong.
- Andre Desire Lock. For public services in Seychelles.
- Derek Evans Lovett, Superintending Pharmaceutical Chemist, Medical Department, Singapore.
- Mwase Lundazi, Senior Chief of the Chewa (Lundazi) Native Authority, Northern Rhodesia.
- Archibald Leslie Mackintosh, Registrar of Co-operatives, Gambia.
- Yerima Mastafa, District Head of Geidam, Bornu Province, Northern Region, Nigeria.
- Alan Lace Mather, Chief Examiner of Motor Vehicles, Nyasaland.
- George Meikle, Assistant Chief Constable, Cyprus.
- David Martin Miles, Education Officer, Northern Region, Nigeria.
- Joni Misikini, Supervising Magistrate, Fiji.
- Alhaji Muhammadu Ribadu, lately Waziri of Adamawa, Northern Region, Nigeria.
- Morshidi bin Osman, Deputy Information Officer, Sarawak.
- Ahmad Hasan Mudhaffar, Intelligence Officer, Aden.
- Murshidi bin Nambi, Lecturer, Education Department, North Borneo.
- The Reverend Isaac Mumamba Mutubila. For public services in Northern Rhodesia.
- Albert Mwanjesa, Liwali of Tunduru, Tanganyika.
- Domingo Moses Navarrete. For services to radio and telecommunications in British Honduras.
- Leonard Henry Nicklin, Assistant Establishment Secretary, Uganda.
- Christopher Chukwumaokwu Nwazota. For public services in the Eastern Region, Nigeria.
- Mary Nzimiro. For public services in the Eastern Region, Nigeria.
- Emanuel Okunsanya Okunowo, Chief Bonasuwa of Ijebu-Ode, Federation of Nigeria.
- Enoch Ifediora Oli. For public services in the Eastern Region, Nigeria.
- Thomas Olubajo Olubajo, Acting Assistant Registrar, Ibadan Branch, Nigerian College of Arts, Science and Technology.
- Una Maude Orme, lately Principal Assistant Secretary, Western Region, Nigeria.
- Kazal Disu Oshodi, Town Planning Officer, Western Region, Nigeria.
- Thomas Kelomwaka Otim, Senior Assistant Agricultural Officer, Uganda.
- Margery Paull, Matron, Kilimatinde Hospital, Tanganyika.
- George Peters, Information Officer, Gambia.
- Beatrice Mary Pope. For services to education in Hong Kong.
- Annie Povedano. For public services in Gibraltar.
- Harry Sarran Ramsaroop. For public services in British Guiana.
- Clyde Archibald Ramsay, Assistant Auditor-General, Barbados.
- Anthony Peter Rice, Assistant Chief Constable, Cyprus.
- Colin Stewart Ridley, Assistant Director of Drainage and Irrigation, British Guiana.
- Mustafa Subhi Riza, Programme Supervisor, Cyprus Broadcasting Service.
- Winifred Vera Ross. For public services in the Northern Region, Nigeria.
- Gladys Ethel Rowe. For public services in Tanganyika.
- Ibrahim Bun Sanusi, Assistant Master and Registrar, Judicial Department, Sierra Leone.
- Devshi Mepa Shah. For public services in Kenya.
- Abdullah Shotah Ali, Senior Accountant, Residency, Mukalla, Eastern Aden Protectorate.
- Harbans Singh, Assistant Engineer, Grade II, East African Posts and Telecommunications Administration, East Africa High Commission.
- Adam Soltysik, Surgeon Specialist, Grenada, Windward Islands.
- Edward Arthur Stanley, Permanent Way Inspector, East African Railways and Harbours Administration, East Africa High Commission.
- Henry Thompson Strudwick, Temporary Medical Officer, Jamaica.
- Tan Piak Kwong. For public services in North Borneo.
- John Kyriakou Theocharides, Manager of the Ocean Bulk Petroleum Installation, at Larnaca, Cyprus.
- George Cornelius Nathaniel Thomas, General Secretary of the Sierra Leone Maritime and Waterfront Workers' Union.
- Neville Lloyd Powell Thomas, Administrative Officer, Somaliland Protectorate.
- Archibald Francis Thomson, Chief Superintendent of Police, Cyprus.
- Denys William Turberville, District Commissioner, Sierra Leone.
- Gerard Peter Wall, Assistant Secretary, Aden.
- Maud Evelyn Williams. For public services in St. Helena.
- Oladele Agbaje Williams, Manager of Ilesha Co-operative Produce Marketing Union, Western Region, Nigeria.
- Alfred Robert Wilson, JP. For public services in Nyasaland.
- Karol Winski, Crown Surveyor, Dominica, Windward Islands.
- Mehdi Yeslam Shama'i, Warrant Qaid, Federal National Guards, Aden.

Honorary Member

- Shariff Omar bin Ahmed bin Sumeit, Senior Kadhi, Zanzibar.

=== Order of the Companions of Honour (CH) ===
- The Right Honourable Alan Tindal Lennox-Boyd, MP, Member of Parliament for Mid-Bedfordshire since 1931. Parliamentary Secretary, Ministry of Labour, 1938–1939, Ministry of Home Security, 1939, Ministry of Food, 1939–1940, and Ministry of Aircraft Production, 1943–1945; Minister of State for the Colonies, 1951–1952; Minister of Transport and Civil Aviation, 1952–1954; Secretary of State for the Colonies, 1954–1959. For political and public services.

=== British Empire Medal (BEM) ===
Military Division

Royal Navy

- Chief Mechanician Ben Braithwaite, D/KX 91056.
- Aircraft Mechanician 1st Class John Franklin Brown, L/FX 742991.
- Master-at-Arms Edward John Burton, C/MX 768059 (on loan to the Royal Malayan Navy).
- Master-at-Arms Kenneth Norman Cann. D/MX 803546.
- Chief Aircraft Artificer Michael Vellacott Case, L/FX 87519.
- Petty Officer Ralph Dunford, D/JX 418879.
- Chief Petty Officer Writer Joseph Fairless, C/M 944531.
- Chief Petty Officer Writer Philip William Fitzgerald, C/MX 58768.
- Lonsie Marion Furmage, Head V.A.D. Nursing Member.
- Chief Petty Officer Cook (S) Leonard Matthew Gadd, C/MX 56752.
- Chief Petty Officer Norman Grant, D/JX 155478.
- Chief Engine Room Artificer Wilfred Hunter, P/MX 49751.
- Chief Petty Officer Albert Victor Johnson, DSM, P/JX 136499.
- Stores Chief Petty Officer (V) Richard Alan Joll, D/MX 63670.
- Chief Electrician Alfred Kay, D/MX 856315.
- Chief Electrician Ronald Frank Keyzor, P/MX 745887.
- Colour Sergeant Russell Geoffrey Knox, Ply.X. 3347, Royal Marines.
- Leading Steward John Muscat, E/LX 645569.
- Chief Engineering Mechanic Leslie Charles Parsons, V.994599, Royal Naval Reserve.
- Chief Wren Margaret Veronica Penney, 47142, Women's Royal Naval Service.
- Petty Officer Hugh Roberts, P/JX 162577.
- Corporal (Acting Sergeant) Henry Robertson, RM. 15967, Royal Marines.
- Chief Communication Yeoman James Robertson, P/JX 162431.
- Chief Engine Room Artificer Frederick John Rowlinson, P/MX 59869.
- Chief Engineering Mechanic Arnold Douglas Saunders, C/KX 94709.
- Chief Petty Officer Walter Ernest Scott, P/JX 801076.
- Chief Electrical Artificer Albert Raymond Smith, P/MX 57485.
- Chief Petty Officer Thomas Churchill Sprake, P/JX 150738.
- Chief Petty Officer Christopher Thomas Wintrell, P/JX 634886.
- Quartermaster Sergeant William Henry Wookey, Po.X. 1247, Royal Marines.
- Chief Radio Communication Supervisor Donald Alexander Yates, DSM, P/J 111764.

Army

- 22559295 Staff-Sergeant (acting) Ronald Adamson, Military Provost Staff Corps; attached Army Air Corps.
- 29481 Company Sergeant-Major Sale Azare, The Queen's Own Nigeria Regiment.
- 14435812 Staff-Sergeant (acting) John Beecroft, Corps of Royal Engineers.
- 7592670 Staff-Sergeant Ronald Frank August Blake, Corps of Royal Electrical and Mechanical Engineers.
- 854712 Staff-Sergeant Robert Desmond Brannan, Royal Regiment of Artillery, Territorial Army.
- 2929845 Sergeant Edward Burke, The Queen's Own Cameron Highlanders, Territorial Army.
- 6757419 Colour-Sergeant Maurice Burns, The Queen's Royal Regiment (West Surrey Territorial Army).
- 1616554 Warrant Officer Class II (acting) Harry Lawrence Cook, Army Catering Corps.
- 22246240 Sergeant Ernest Michael Burgess Crook, Corps of Royal Engineers.
- N.8033 Regimental Sergeant-Major Oliado Ole Dabu, 4th Battalion, The King's African Rifles (The Uganda Rifles).
- 21146803 Corporal Deoman Limbu, 7th Duke of Edinburgh's Own Gurkha Rifles.
- 14945756 Warrant Officer Class II (acting) Charles Alan Dossor, Royal Corps of Signals.
- 22301304 Staff-Sergeant Frank Gee Dudley, Corps of Royal Engineers, Territorial Army.
- 22226689 Staff-Sergeant (Armament Artificer) Myrddin Dyer, Corps of Royal Electrical and Mechanical Engineers, Territorial Army.
- 22296598 Sergeant (acting) Donald Hamilton Leslie Ellis, Corps of Royal Electrical and Mechanical Engineers.
- 21023950 Staff-Sergeant David Pedwick Evans, Corps of Royal Engineers.
- 22550954 Staff-Sergeant William Stanley Gale, Royal Army Veterinary Corps.
- 22353635 Staff-Sergeant Joseph Wilson Gate, Corps of Royal Electrical and Mechanical Engineers, Territorial Army.
- 22212894 Staff-Sergeant James John Green, Royal Corps of Signals.
- T/71975 Staff-Sergeant William Rowland Hawes, Royal Army Service Corps.
- S/22997041 Staff-Sergeant Norman Frederick Hemmings, Royal Army Service Corps.
- 14457340 Warrant Officer Class II (acting) (now Substantive) Charles Thomas Arthur Hughes, Royal Corps of Signals.
- 22297167 Sergeant Hector Ernest Jones, The Cheshire Yeomanry (Earl of Chester's), Royal Armoured Corps, Territorial Army.
- 22216482 Colour-Sergeant (acting) Joseph Thomas Patrick Kenny, Irish Guards.
- 22201304 Staff-Sergeant James Elias Kerr, Corps of Royal Electrical and Mechanical Engineers.
- 22560016 Sergeant (acting) John Edwin Kitchen, Corps of Royal Engineers.
- 5825132 Sergeant (acting) William Lewis Legge, Corps of Royal Military Police.
- S/5784511 Warrant Officer Class II (acting) Jack Charles Mayston, Royal Army Service Corps.
- 22224381 Warrant Officer Class II (acting) Terence Wesley Newell, Royal Army Medical Corps.
- 5568685 Sergeant Albert Victor Norgate, Corps of Royal Electrical and Mechanical Engineers.
- 22534382 Sergeant Joseph Parkinson, The Royal Ulster Rifles, Territorial Army.
- 2040528 Staff-Sergeant Leslie Percy Pascoe, Corps of Royal Engineers.
- 2619224 Colour-Sergeant Bernard Pyecroft, Grenadier Guards.
- 1157364 Sergeant Michael Quinn, Royal Regiment of Artillery.
- 1872579 Staff-Sergeant Victor Theodore Richardson, Corps of Royal Engineers.
- T/2662085 Staff-Sergeant Richard Robinson, Royal Army Service Corps.
- 274778 Warrant Officer Class II (acting) Reginald John Sewell, Royal Army Ordnance Corps; attached Trucial Oman Scouts.
- 6084890 Sergeant Charles William Swinden, Army Catering Corps, Territorial Army.
- S/22570418 Sergeant Barrie David Thomas, Royal Army Service Corps.
- W/359791 Sergeant (acting) Christina Philip Gillanders Thomson, Women's Royal Armoured Corps.
- S/22814534 Sergeant Donald Wadsworth, Royal Army Service Corps.
- 5334474 Warrant Officer Class II (local) Ernest Whitewick, The Duke of Edinburgh's Royal Regiment (Berkshire and Wiltshire).
- 14130043 Sergeant Leslie Roberts Wilkes, Royal Regiment of Artillery.
- 14278431 Sergeant Rennie Wilson, Corps of Royal Engineers.
- W/316527 Staff-Sergeant Iris Worsley, Women's Royal Army Corps.
- 2610920 Sergeant Thomas William Yardley, Grenadier Guards.
- 21125427 Sergeant Alan James Yates, Royal Corps of Signals.
- 22983180 Corporal Mario Zammit, Royal Corps of Signals.

Royal Air Force

- 577479 Flight Sergeant Frederick Harry Baker.
- 570702 Flight Sergeant Dennis Colin Bushnell.
- 569812 Flight Sergeant Kenneth William Edward Chambers.
- 571688 Flight Sergeant Allan Brooks Chapman.
- 613628 Flight Sergeant Ernest Clark.
- 540425 Flight Sergeant Thomas Cecil Eric Meek.
- 568308 Flight Sergeant Joseph Gerald Romney Prag.
- 528621 Flight Sergeant Eric Vaughan Prince.
- 562315 Flight Sergeant Arthur Severn.
- 571555 Flight Sergeant Frederick Arthur Smith.
- 530561 Flight Sergeant John Finder Smith.
- 510777 Flight Sergeant Walter Roworth Spray.
- 704963 Flight Sergeant Tadeusz Zygmunt Stepniewski.
- 568882 Flight Sergeant John McConnell White.
- 574888 Chief Technician Arthur Edwin Caves.
- 518811 Chief Technician Frederick Edward Dack.
- 614648 Chief Technician Norman Charles Devereux.
- 575520 Chief Technician Eric Ivor Ross Jordan.
- 574978 Chief Technician Charles McDowell.
- 573544 Chief Technician Joseph Francis Narramore.
- 546636 Chief Technician Leonard Frank Standing.
- 553340 Chief Technician Francis Bany Wilkinson.
- 2276448 Acting Flight Sergeant Ivor Kenneth Alderman.
- 3500258 Acting Flight Sergeant Harry Frank Appleby.
- 525602 Acting Flight Sergeant Kenneth Carrington.
- 579717 Acting Flight Sergeant James Wanless Smith.
- 573053 Sergeant Henry William Batty.
- 792358 Sergeant Mieczyslaw Belza.
- 583989 Sergeant Stanley Frederick Albert Burr.
- 3502702 Sergeant John Emerson.
- 1127602 Sergeant Alfred Pritchard.
- 578678 Sergeant John Rae.
- 3501219 Sergeant Gerald Charles Victor Roberts.
- 592089 Sergeant Peter Kenneth Robinson.
- 621309 Sergeant George James Walter.
- 4026048 Sergeant Douglas Wren.
- 584182 Senior Technician David Samuel Hill.
- 3502119 Acting Sergeant Alfred Windsor Bevan.
- 2367545 Acting Sergeant Keith Arthur Jolliffe.
- 583741 Acting Sergeant John Michael Steed.
- 2223262 Corporal William Robert Johnson.
- 586407 Corporal Angus Sutherland.
- 4117608 Corporal Roy Brian Webb.
- 4039082 Acting Corporal Alexander Scott Aitken Bodman.
- 3518873 Senior Aircraftman George Murphy.

Civil Division
United Kingdom

- Harry Stanley Adams, Chargehand, Sheffield Undertaking, East Midlands Gas Board.
- Sydney Armishaw, Senior Examiner, Aeronautical Inspection Service, No. 99 Maintenance Unit, RAF High Ercall. (Wellington, Shropshire.)
- Joe Armitage, Civilian Instructor, Grade III, RAF Technical College, Henlow. (Shillington.)
- Edward Donald Arnold, Commandant, Bedfordshire Special Constabulary. (Bedford.)
- Jabez Barrie Atherton, Electric Welder, Billingham Division, Imperial Chemical Industries Ltd. (Middlesbrough.)
- Adeline Mabel Ayre, Collector, Rowledge Village Savings Group, Farnham, Surrey.
- Lawrence Alma Balmforth, Chief Observer, Post 3/N.1, No. 3 Group, Royal Observer Corps. (Abingdon.)
- Frances Barr, Assistant Supervisor, Telephones, Head Post Office, Oldgate, Morpeth.
- Nellie Millicent Beaty, County Borough Clothing Specialist, Carlisle, Women's Voluntary Services.
- George Geoffrey Bickers, Brigade Welfare Officer, London Fire Brigade. (London S.W.3.)
- Ike Biddlecombe, Printer, HMS Ganges, Ipswich. (Shotley.)
- Alfred Bishop, Clerk of Works, Grade II, RAF Yatesbury. (Chippenham.)
- George Bertram Blow, Chief Telephone Supervisor, Malta Signal Squadron, War Office.
- Alec Clifford Booth, Messenger-in-Charge, HMS Royal Arthur, Corsham. (Hawthorn.)
- Frank Bright, Signal Officer, Civil Defence Corps, Southend-on-Sea.
- Kathleen May Brudenell, Supervisor (Telephones), Head Post Office, Wide Bargate, Boston, Lincolnshire.
- Robert Patrick Butler, Caretaker, Labuan War Cemetery, North Borneo, Imperial War Graves Commission (Anzac Agency).
- William George Bygrave, Chief Instructor, Letchworth Government Training Centre, Ministry of Labour. (Stotfold, Bedfordshire.)
- Nicholas Caffrey, Chargehand Electrician's Mate, Royal Ordnance Factory, Charley, Lancashire. (Blackburn.)
- Minnie Carlisle, Collector, Women's Voluntary Services Savings Group, Manchester.
- Jeffrey Crase Currie Chalmers, Custodian, Linlithgow Palace, Ministry of Works, West Lothian.
- Walter Norman Coleman, Overhead Crane Driver, Dorman Long (Bridge & Engineering) Ltd., Middlesbrough.
- Herbert John Colhoun, Constable, Royal Ulster Constabulary. (Belfast.)
- James Fortescue Connolly, Senior Foreman, Davidson & Co. Ltd., Belfast.
- Hugh Connor, Senior Deck Plater (Marker), J. L. Thompson & Sons Ltd., Sunderland.
- John Thomas Seth Cornish, Principal Keeper, Anvil Point Lighthouse, Corporation of Trinity House. (Swanage.)
- Kenneth John Crees, Excavator Driver, Essex Drainage Department, Ministry of Agriculture, Fisheries and Food. (Little Clacton.)
- William Charles Dangerfield, Assistant Inspector, London Postal Region, General Post Office. (Harrow.)
- John Davenport, Manager of Buffer Depots, Tattenhall & Tarporley, Cheshire.
- John Charles Deem, General Foreman, E.B.C. & Sleeman Ltd. (Axminster.)
- Wilfred Dick, Instructor, Ashington Colliery, Northern (N. & C.) Division, National Coal Board.
- Archibald Charles Dingle, Civilian Warrant Officer, No. 24F (West Cornwall) Squadron, Air Training Corps. (Penzance.)
- Doreen Douglas, Member, Women's Voluntary Services, Northern Ireland. For services to Anglo-Egyptian Resettlement. (Bangor.)
- Walter Eaton, Face Worker, Shirland Colliery, East Midlands Division, National Coal Board.
- George Henry Eggerton, Back Ripper, Wolstanton Colliery, West Midlands Division, National Coal Board. (Stoke-on-Trent.)
- Hubert Ernest Wallace Elliott, Technical Instructor, Grade III, War Office. (Gosport, Hampshire.)
- Bertram Frank Evans, Armament and General Workshops Foreman, Proof and Experimental Establishment, Shoeburyness, Ministry of Aviation.
- John Ferguson, Senior Marine Survey Assistant, Ministry of Transport, Glasgow.
- Thomas Ferguson, Leading Fireman, Central Area Fire Brigade, Cove, Dunbartonshire.
- Arnold Edward Fitzgibbon, Donkeyman, SS Vitrinia, Shell Tankers Ltd. (Newcastle.)
- Ng Ki For, Hospital Steward, Royal Naval Hospital, Hong Kong.
- William Gaddes, Foreman Fitter, Carlisle Power Station, North West Merseyside and North Wales Region, Central Electricity Generating Board.
- Francis John Garraway. For services to St. Saviour's Youth Club, Bath.
- Frederick Arthur Geddis, Turner, Locomotive Works, Eastleigh, British Railways.
- Robert Gibb, Leader of Crossgates Youth Club, Fife.
- William Henry Longman Gibbons, lately Over-seer of Servants, The Royal Military Academy, Sandhurst.
- Thomas William Glasspool, Chief Inspector, West Riding of Yorkshire Constabulary. (Burley-in-Wharfedale.)
- Thomas Henry Godfrey, Leading Technical Officer, General Post Office. (London, S.W.12.)
- Tom Goode, Station Officer, Northamptonshire Fire Brigade. (Corby.)
- George Graves, Chief Dock Foreman, British Transport Docks, Garston. (Liverpool.)
- Gerald Howarth Green, Mechanic Examiner, Ministry of Aviation. (Keighley, Lancashire.)
- William Greenlees, Civilian Warrant Officer, No. 1036 (Bury) Squadron, Air Training Corps. (Bury.)
- Ellen Elizabeth Greim, Assistant Nurse, Royal Hospital, Chelsea. (Leatherhead, Surrey.)
- Elizabeth Margaret Groves, Trolley Shop Officer, Dundee Centre, Women's Voluntary Services.
- John Gunter, Surface Labourer, Kay and Garn Slopes Colliery, South Western Division, National Coal Board. (Abergavenny.)
- Oliver Mary Hadley, Collector, North Warwickshire Colliery Savings Group, Polesworth.
- Mary Hallam, Member of the Welfare Section, Civil Defence Corps, Rutland. (Oakham.)
- Hubert Edward Hammond, Engineer Technical Grade II (Foreman), Armament Research and Development Establishment, Ministry of Aviation. (Bexleyheath, Kent.)
- Mabel Harding, Sub-Postmistress, Westcott Place Sub-Post Office, Swindon.
- Henry Emlyn Hardy, Senior Volunteer, Ambulance and Casualty Collecting Section, Civil Defence Corps, Sheffield.
- William Silas Harffey, General Foreman, Eastbourne District, South Eastern Electricity Board. (Eastbourne.)
- Reginald George Harris, Chief District Inspector, Swansea, British Railways.
- John Hartigan, Technician I, Euston Telephone Exchange, General Post Office (London, S.W.11.)
- Frederick Thomas Henry Harwood, Office Keeper, Grade 2, Foreign Office. (London, S.E.20.)
- John Hathway, Supervisor, S. M. Wilmot & Co. Ltd., Bristol.
- Frederick Heardman. For services to the Peak District National Park. (Edale.)
- Margaret Annie Hill, Temporary Sorting Assistant, Savings Department, General Post Office. (Hounslow, Middlesex.)
- Alexander Hook, Foreman, Brown Bros, & Co. Ltd. Edinburgh.
- Harry Keeson Houston, Principal Instructor, Polmont Borstal Institution, Scottish Home Department. (Falkirk.)
- Henry Charles Howard, Refrigerating Greaser, MS Otaio, New Zealand Shipping Co. Ltd. (London, E.13.)
- Thomas Henry Hunt, Heavy Foundry Superintendent, F. H. Lloyd & Co. Ltd., Wednesbury.
- Henry George Jarvis, Chief Stillman, Carless, Capel & Leonard Ltd., London. (London, E.3.)
- John Johnston, Inspector and Deputy Chief Constable, Zetland Constabulary. (Lerwick.)
- Alfred Gwyn Jones, Stockman, Peppard Farm, Henley.
- Edith Mary Jones, Collector, Streets Savings Group, Aberystwyth.
- Henry Jordan, Assistant Foreman, Harland & Wolff Ltd., Belfast.
- Christopher Gerald Keeley, Instructor, Civil Defence Corps, Middlesbrough.
- George Edward Kent, MM, Welfare Liaison Officer, Robert Stephenson & Hawthorns Ltd. (Aycliffe, Co. Durham.)
- Douglas H. Lamb, Warden, Maldon Youth Hostel, Essex.
- John Law, Senior Installation Inspector, North Eastern Electricity Board. (York.)
- Benjamin Roy Levarity, Stores Supervisor, Imperial Lighthouse Service, Bahamas.
- Frederick Arthur Loomes, Technical Officer, Research Station, General Post Office. (Uxbridge, Middlesex.)
- Edward Maurice McCarthy, Travelling Supervisor, South-East Area, Ravensbourne Telephone Exchange, General Post Office. (Bromley, Kent.)
- Charles Bernard McCartney, Chief Steward, MS British Officer, B.P. Tanker Co. Ltd. (Falmouth.)
- Elizabeth Mackenzie, County Transport Officer, Warwickshire, Women's Voluntary Services. (Leamington Spa.)
- Charles McKeown, Postman, Western Central District Office, General Post Office. (London, W.C.2.)
- Ernest Mann, JP, Training Officer, Nook Colliery, North Western Division, National Coal Board. (Manchester.)
- John Cook Mathieson, Foreman, Carron Company, Stirlingshire. (By Falkirk.)
- Earley Maude, Member of the Women's Voluntary Services in Leeds.
- Walter Frank Miller, Reproduction, Grade B.II, Ordnance Survey, Ministry of Agriculture, Fisheries and Food. (Southampton.)
- Jane Millar Morrison, Member, National Warning and Monitoring Organisation, Edinburgh.
- John Mullalley, Head Telephonist, General Hospital, Birmingham.
- Leonard Leslie Munday, Chief Observer, Post 3/E.3., No. 3 Group, Royal Observer Corps. (Bidford-on-Avon.)
- James Norman Neil Murray, Civilian Radio Operator, War Office, Cyprus.
- John Nicholson, Boiler Maker's Plater, Leeds & Bradford Boiler Co. Ltd. (Pudsey.)
- Jacob Nisbet, Able Seaman, Whale Catcher Southern Garden, Chr. Salvesen & Co. (St. Abbs, Berwickshire.)
- William O'Brien, Nursing Assistant, St. John's Hospital, Stone, Aylesbury.
- Thomas Ormerod, Foreman Engineer, Grayson, Rollo & Clover Docks Ltd., Liverpool. (Wallasey.)
- Costas Papantoniou, Clerk of Works, War Office, Nicosia, Cyprus.
- Manuel Pastana, lately Ship's Cook, Uskmouth, Richard W. Jones & Co. (Newport)
- Frank George William Pennells, Master Stevedore, HM Dockyard, Chatham. (Gillingham.)
- Jack Phillips, Inspector, Head Post Office, Basildon, Essex.
- Reginald Johnson Pitman, Foreman of Trades, No. 12 Maintenance Unit, RAF Kirkbride. (Wigton.)
- Samual Victor Hyde-Price, JP, Postman, Head Post Office, Blackpool.
- Robert Pyper, Farmer, Drumee, Castlewellan, Co. Down.
- James Bowden Raitt, Progress Chaser, Keith Blackman Ltd., Arbroath.
- James Ramage, Process Supervisor, Grade I, Capenhurst Works, United Kingdom Atomic Energy Authority. (Chester.)
- William Alfred Rawlins, Instructor, Civil Defence Corps, Bournemouth.
- George Bell Richardson, Gas Welder, Ashmore, Benson, Pease & Co. Ltd., Stockton-on-Tees.
- Joseph W. Rimmer, Caretaker, The Grange Secondary Modern Boys' School, Ellesmere Port, Cheshire.
- Doris Ada Roberts, Assistant Telephone Mechanic, Post Office Factory, Birmingham.
- Ethel Rose Roberts, Commandant, M/28 Detachment, British Red Cross Society, Merionethshire (Harlech.)
- William Thew Robinson, Fitter (Mechanical), Dunston 'E' Power Station, North Eastern Division, Central Electricity Generating Board. (Newcastle-upon-Tyne.)
- Emily Rowe, Collector, Street Savings Group, Lymington.
- William Robert Rowe, Foreman, Whites Shipyard (Southampton) Ltd., Itchen. (Southampton.)
- Redmond Vaughan Rowkins, Assistant Family Welfare Officer, R.N. Barracks, Portsmouth. (Southsea.)
- John Thomas William Rowles, Voluntary Associate, Borstal Association. (Cardiff.)
- George William Rushgrove, Sub-Officer, Denbighshire and Montgomeryshire Fire Brigade. (Welshpool.)
- Salleh bin Mohammad Amin, Technical Supervisor, Office of the Commissioner-General for the United Kingdom in South East Asia, Singapore.
- Cheung Sang, Draughtsman, Grade I, HM Dockyard, Hong Kong.
- John Scott, Slipway Foreman and Rigger, Herd & Mackenzie, Buckie.
- Abdul Ghafoor Shahabuddin, Works Supervisor, Grade I, RAF Riyan, British Forces, Arabian Peninsula.
- Thomas Shevlin, Salvage Man, Chislet Colliery, South Eastern Division, National Goal Board. (Canterbury.)
- Helen Agnes Shillito, Collector, St. Paul's Mothers' Union Savings Group, Derby.
- Frederick Arthur Slingsby, Non-Technical III, Royal Ordnance Factory, Nottingham. (Beeston.)
- Harry Smith, Shift Superintendent, The British Aluminium Co. Ltd., Falkirk.
- Stanley William Smith, Postman, House of Commons Branch Office, General Post Office. (Bromley, Kent.)
- William Angus Smith, Technical Officer, Telephone Manager's Office, Aberdeen. (Lerwick, Shetland.)
- Edward Collins Sprot, Tractor Driver, Smallways Depot, Ministry of Agriculture, Fisheries and Food, Richmond, Yorkshire.
- John Steadman, General Foreman, East Greenwich Gas Works, South Eastern Gas Board. (London, S.E.10.)
- Thomas Stewart, Superintendent Clerk of Works, Grade II, Ministry of Commerce for Northern Ireland. (Larne, Co. Antrim.)
- Susan Stokes, Centre Organiser, St. Austell Rural District, Women's Voluntary Services. (Newquay.)
- Leslie Gordon Strong, Chief Inspector, Buckinghamshire Constabulary. (Slough.)
- Harold Swindell, Patternmaker, Stanton Ironworks Co. Ltd., Riddings, Derbyshire.
- Ernest Taylor, Foreman, Automatic Telephone & Electric Co. Ltd., Liverpool.
- Joseph Taylor, Checkweighman, South Pelaw Colliery, Durham Division, National Coal Board. (Chester-le-Street.)
- Edward Charles Thaxton, Inspector, Metropolitan Police Force. (London, N.7.)
- George Henry Newell Thomas, Chief Inspector, War Department Constabulary, Ministry of Aviation. (Monkswood, Monmouthshire.)
- Walter Thompson, Foreman-Meter reader and collector, Yorkshire Electricity Board. (Leeds.)
- Charles Ernest Thurgoqd, Premises Officer, London Airport, British Overseas Airways Corporation. (Stanwell, Middlesex.)
- Albert Henry Dillon Trengove, Foreman, North Western Electricity Board. (Bolton.)
- Ivy Vickers, County Staff Specialist, Lincolnshire Lindsey, Women's Voluntary Services. (Market Rasen.)
- Stanley Vigar, Transport Officer, Arts Council of Great Britain. (Kenton, Middlesex.)
- Henry Francis Wadley, Stone Carver, Ministry of Works. (Lancing, Sussex.)
- Percival Frank Wallace, Coastguardsman, HM Coastguard, St. Alban's Head, Ministry of Transport. (Swanage.)
- Mary Walsh, Collector, Street Savings Group, Belfast.
- Charles George Watson,. Foreman Engineer, Universal Oil Co. Ltd. and, Alfred Smith Ltd. (Hull.)
- Evelyn Whelan, Manageress, N.A.A.F.I. Canteen, Havannah Barracks, Bordon, Hampshire.
- Joseph Whiteside, Sub-Postmaster, Kirkham, Preston.
- Samuel James Carleton Wilson, Sub-District Commandant, Ulster Special Constabulary. (Ballymena.)
- Henry Wong, Local Clerk, Grade "A", HM Dockyard, Hong Kong.
- Charles Edwin Wright, Collector, Palmers Hebburn Works Savings Club, Gateshead.
- Alfred Philip Wyles, Chief Inspector, Birmingham City Police Force.
- John Eric Youde, Instructor, Civil Defence Corps, Chester.

State of Victoria

- Henry Burnett Marks, Senior Government Chauffeur, State of Victoria.

Federation of Malaya

- Alexander Thompson Nisbet, lately Police Lieutenant, Royal Federation of Malaya Police Force.

Southern Rhodesia

- Francis Paul Hill, Sub-Inspector, British South Africa Police.
- Manyepa, Head Messenger, Binga, Native Affairs Department.
- Sidaga, Head Messenger, Gokwe, Native Affairs Department.
- Alfred Walker, Reserve Chief Inspector, British South Africa Police Reserve.

Basutoland

- Petros Mqedlana, Political Messenger, Basutoland Administration.

Swaziland

- Frans Jacob Labuschagne, Station Manager, Mpisi Cattle Breeding Station, Swaziland.

Overseas Territories

- Sydney Herbert Dabell Brister, Detective Inspector, Cyprus Police Force.
- Egli Agesilaou Christou, Matron, Reform School, Lapithos, Cyprus.
- Neville John Fahy, Inspector, Cyprus Police Force.
- Ahmed Akif Mehmed, Mukhtar of Vatili village, Cyprus.
- Antonis Orphanou, Chief Foreman, Department of Antiquities, Cyprus.
- John Alan Rollo, lately Inspector, Cyprus Police Force.
- Enis Rushen Salih, Sergeant, Cyprus Police Force.
- Iddi Alii Udoddy, Clerk Grade VI, East African Railways and Harbours Administration.
- Jane Eliza McAskill. For services to the fanning community in the Falkland Islands.
- Landing Janneh, Assistant Works Superintendent, Public Works Department, Gambia.
- Alexandrina Maduro, Teacher at a community school, Leeward Islands.
- Alfred Pickering. For services to the Tortola Juvenile Band, Leeward Islands.
- Ignatius Ikenweiwe, Sergeant-Major, Nigeria Police, Federation of Nigeria.
- Alhaji Ibi Musa, Nurse, Kano Native Authority, Northern Region, Nigeria.
- Umaru, Birnin Kebbi, Senior Dispensary Attendant, Yauri Emirate, Northern Region, Nigeria.
- Festus Akinrolaye Akinwale, Farmer, Western Region, Nigeria.
- Abdullah bin Anson, Land Clerk, Labuan, North Borneo.
- Edwin Sunny Kapotwe, Co-operative Assistant, Northern Rhodesia.
- Eldred Abiodu Metzger, Survey Superintendent, Sierra Leone.
- Abdi Said, Curator, Save the Children Fund Home, Somaliland Protectorate.
- Juma Mnubi, Wakili of Urungu Chiefdom, Tanganyika.
- Wilfred Ochola, Prison Officer, Dodoma Central Prison, Tanganyika.
- Kishan Singh s/o Ganga Singh, Inspector of Works, Public Works Department, Entebbe, Uganda.
- Cephas Baetalua, Chief Headman, Toabaita Sub-district on Malaita, Western Pacific.
- Mohamed bin Ali, Regimental Sergeant Major, Police Force, Zanzibar.

=== Royal Victorian Medal (RVM) ===
In Silver

- Yeoman Bed Goer Amos Allison, DCM, Her Majesty's Bodyguard of The Yeomen of the Guard.
- Chief Petty Officer Writer Patrick Ernest Barrett, P/MX 47874.
- Ernest George Bartlett.
- Edward Dodd.
- Edith Mary Elliott.
- James Gillan.
- Police Constable George William Jackson, Metropolitan Police.
- Lucy Lintott.
- John Niven.
- William Rawlings.
- Margaret Rose.
- Francis George Shefford.
- Henry Shurley.
- William Shurley.
- Bertram Turp.

=== Royal Red Cross (RRC) ===
- Lieutenant-Colonel Elsie Pullom, ARRC, (206386), Queen Alexandra's Royal Army Nursing Corps.
- Major Anne O'Connell (206359), Queen Alexandra's Royal Army Nursing Corps.

==== Associate of the Royal Red Cross (ARRC) ====
- Pamela Phyllis Palmgren, Superintending Sister, Queen Alexandra's Royal Naval Nursing Service.
- Alice Jary, Head V.A.D. Nursing Member.
- Major Edith Marjorie Stonham (206453), Queen Alexandra's Royal Army Nursing Corps.
- Captain Annie Stevenson Loggie Anderson (417738), Queen Alexandra's Royal Army Nursing Corps.
- Captain Betty Sawyer (434154), Queen Alexandra's Royal Army Nursing Corps.
- Squadron Officer Elizabeth Henrietta Robertson Macdonald (406817), Princess Mary's Royal Air Force Nursing Service.
- Flight Officer Renee Annie Penrose (406825), Princess Mary's Royal Air Force Nursing Service.

=== Air Force Cross (AFC) ===
Royal Air Force

- Wing Commander Michael James Beetham, DFC, (135704).
- Wing Commander Colin Marshall Fell (60801).
- Wing Commander Denis Fenn Rixson, OBE, DFC, (39393).
- Squadron Leader Francis Gordon Agnew (164965).
- Squadron Leader Geoffrey Crerar Cairns (57721).
- Squadron Leader Richard John Frederick Dickinson (58764).
- Squadron Leader Thomas Ralph Holland (58754).
- Squadron Leader Brian Patrick William Mercer (3110215).
- Squadron Leader Richard David Mullins (180227).
- Squadron Leader Leslie William Phipps (3117549).
- Flight Lieutenant David Stanley Burden (4032549).
- Flight Lieutenant John Gordon Davies (579944).
- Flight Lieutenant Desmond Draper (575048).
- Flight Lieutenant Eric Edward Fell (1179544).
- Flight Lieutenant Alan John Harris (1585528).
- Flight Lieutenant Dudley Maxwell Lewis Lob (55170).
- Flight Lieutenant Harry McMaster, AFM, (1521800).
- Flight Lieutenant Leigh Simpson (152338).
- Flight Lieutenant Ronald Alfred Stenning (1850868).
- Flight Lieutenant William Clunas Wood, AFM, (1344016).

==== Bar to the Air Force Cross ====
Royal Navy

- Commander Kenneth Roy Hickson, AFC.

Royal Air Force

- Acting Wing Commander Anthony William Ringer, AFC, (190709).
- Squadron Leader Thomas Lawrie Kennedy, AFC, (4000831).

=== Air Force Medal (AFM) ===
- 1321076 Flight Sergeant James Alfred Mears, Royal Air Force.

=== Queen's Commendation for Valuable Service in the Air ===
United Kingdom

- Captain William Minas Jacob, Flight Superintendent, Training, Skyways Ltd.
- Captain John Woodman, Senior Captain, First Class, Boeing 707 Flight, British Overseas Airways Corporation.

Overseas Territory

- Captain Thomas McQueen Robertson, Managing Pilot, Borneo Airways Ltd.

Royal Navy

- Lieutenant-Commander Peter Bramley Reynolds.

Royal Air Force

- Wing Commander Alistair Donald Boyle (128557).
- Squadron Leader Peter John Bardon, DFC, (607039).
- Squadron Leader John Hamilton Garstin (200041).
- Squadron Leader Norman Greenhalgh (194334).
- Squadron Leader Leonard Charles Gregory, DFC, (60336).
- Squadron Leader Hugh Harrison, AFC, (3041680).
- Squadron Leader Roy Marsden Jenkins, AFC, (1652817).
- Squadron Leader Raymond Alexander McPhie, (59551).
- Squadron Leader Francis Paul Mulkern (177103).
- Squadron Leader James Primrose (502116).
- Squadron Leader Peter Alan Thomson (191928).
- Squadron Leader Thomas William Willmott, DFM, (120033).
- Squadron Leader Ian Arthur Nigel Worby (607077).
- Flight Lieutenant Roy Edward Bennett (195393).
- Flight Lieutenant Douglas Stuart Bridson (3123583).
- Flight Lieutenant Alexander McLean Cobban (2709585).
- Flight Lieutenant Raynham George Hanna (4037254).
- Flight Lieutenant Walter Hinrichs (503661).
- Flight Lieutenant David Mangnall Howorth (82678).
- Flight Lieutenant Donald Graham Kinch, DFM, (3046142).
- Flight Lieutenant Roy Fazakerley Lawrenson, DFM, (182983).
- Flight Lieutenant David Ferric Moffat (2600539).
- Flight Lieutenant Edward Statters (151571).
- Flight Lieutenant John Henry Turner (4119353).
- Flying Officer Kenneth Holbrook Wilson, AFM, (1605130).
- Master Pilot Alpin John Ramsey Baker, (1339302).
- Master Pilot Frank Holliday (624985).
- Master Pilot Frantisek Radina (788991).
- Master Engineer Thomas Lawrence Salter, DFM, (577155).
- 1682640 Flight Sergeant John Patterson Dunn.
- 4172282 Senior Aircraftman Earle James Stewart.

=== Queen's Police Medal (QPM) ===
England and Wales

- Gerald Frank Goodman, Chief Constable, Halifax Borough Police.
- Sydney Joseph Harvey, Chief Constable, Birkenhead Borough Police.
- Alexander Jeffrey, Chief Constable, Warrington Borough Police.
- Norman William Frederick Fowler, OBE, Assistant Chief Constable, Kent County Constabulary.
- William John Henry Palfrey, Assistant Chief Constable, Lancashire Constabulary.
- Walter Alfred Henry Hill, BEM, Chief Superintendent, Bristol City Police.
- Cecil Kitch, Chief Superintendent, Metropolitan Police.
- Reginald Gough Matthews, Chief Superintendent, Glamorganshire Constabulary.
- John Edward Freestone, Superintendent, Leicestershire and Rutland Constabulary.
- William John Poole, Superintendent (Grade I), Metropolitan Police.
- George Edward Salter, Superintendent (Grade I), Metropolitan Police.
- Walter William Wood, OBE, Chief of Police, Western Area, British Transport Commission Police.

Scotland

- Sydney Arthur Berry, Chief Constable, Dumfries and Galloway Constabulary.
- Gordon McHardy Campbell, Superintendent, Stirling and Clackmannan Police.

Northern Ireland

- John Edward Shephard, Head Constable, Royal Ulster Constabulary.

State of Victoria

- Inspecting Superintendent George James Dixon, Victoria Police Force.
- Inspecting Superintendent Colin McPherson, Victoria Police Force.
- Superintendent Rupert Henry Arnold, Victoria Police Force.
- Superintendent Hugh Valentine Clugston, Victoria Police Force.

Southern Rhodesia

- George Lionel Fitzwilliam, Senior Assistant Commissioner, British South Africa Police.

Overseas Territories

- John Edward Stevenson Browne, OBE, Chief Constable of Cyprus.
- Cyril Willcox, Assistant Commissioner of Police, Hong Kong.
- Noel Alfred Crosswell, MBE, Deputy Commissioner of Police, Jamaica.
- Bernard Alan Sheldon, Assistant Commissioner of Police, Kenya.
- Harold John William Watkins, Senior Superintendent of Police, Federation of Nigeria.
- Peter Long, Assistant Commissioner of Police, Nyasaland.
- Arthur Ernest Minns, Senior Assistant Commissioner of Police, Singapore.

=== Queen's Fire Services Medal (QFSM) ===
England and Wales

- Arnold Thomas Owrid, Divisional Officer, Manchester Fire Brigade.
- John Howe, Chief Officer, Salford Fire Brigade.
- Albert Pickering, Chief Officer, Oldham Fire Brigade.
- Bernard Anthony Christmas, Chief Officer, Cornwall Fire Brigade.

Northern Ireland

- Thomas John Browne, Divisional Northern Ireland Fire Authority Officer.

State of New South Wales

- Horace Wentworth Pye, Chief Officer, New South Wales Fire Brigades.
- D'Arcy Raymond Hawkins, Deputy Chief Officer, New South Wales Fire Brigades.
- Charles Forde, Captain, Young Volunteer Fire Brigade.

=== Colonial Police Medal (CPM) ===
Southern Rhodesia

- Amos, Station Sergeant, British South Africa Police.
- William Crabtree, Superintendent, British South Africa Police.
- William John Dickson, Chief Inspector, British South Africa Police.
- Ernest, Detective 1st Sergeant, British South Africa Police.
- Percy Hoyle, Staff Chief Inspector, British South Africa Police.
- Malungusa, Station Sergeant, British South Africa Police.
- Laurence Eaton Montague Tuke, Superintendent, British South Africa Police.
- Eric Gordon Hammett White, Superintendent, British South Africa Police.

Bechuanaland Protectorate

- Botshelo Juma, Corporal, Bechuanaland Protectorate Police Force.
- Wynand Mallen, Superintendent, Bechuanaland Protectorate Police Force.

Overseas Territories

- Arjan Singh, Sergeant-Major, Sarawak Police Force.
- Alii Atanda Bada, Sergeant-Major, Nigeria Police Force.
- Alfred Trevor Bevan, Superintendent, Nyasaland Police Force.
- Roy Henry Victor Biles, Commissioner, Zanzibar Police Force.
- Chak Shing Tsik, Acting Divisional Officer, Hong Kong Fire Brigade.
- Kikubi Chambo, Sergeant, Kenya Police Force.
- Chan Chor Choi, Staff Sergeant, Hong Kong Police Force.
- Chan Ping Sin, Sergeant, Hong Kong Police Force.
- Chu Chun Man, Inspector, Hong Kong Police Force.
- John Thomas Cresswell Denley, Assistant Superintendent, Nigeria Police Force.
- Alexander John Dibdin, Senior Superintendent, Nigeria Police Force.
- Charles Francis Edwards, Band Inspector, Trinidad Police Force.
- James Forsyth Ferrier, Superintendent, Hong Kong Police Force.
- Philip Edmund Stanley Finney, OBE, Assistant Commissioner, Nyasaland Police Force.
- Sydney James Gander, Superintendent, Cyprus Police Force.
- Chetwynd Granger, Deputy Superintendent, British Guiana Police Force.
- William Stewart Grant, Assistant Superintendent, Kenya Police Force.
- Garth Handley, Superintendent, Sierra Leone Police Force.
- Michael Somerset Hannington, Superintendent, Tanganyika Police Force.
- Robert Haig Hansen, Deputy Superintendent, North Borneo Police Force.
- Salih Hassan, Superintendent, Cyprus Police Force.
- James Michael Herlihy, Assistant Superintendent, Cyprus Police Force.
- Courtenay Leathern Humphrys, Superintendent, Nyasaland Police Force.
- Robert Ohue Ibazebo, Superintendent, Nigeria Police Force.
- Vincent Ibezim, Sergeant, Nigeria Police Force.
- Dickson Igbinovia, Assistant Chief Officer, Grade 1, Lagos Fire Brigade, Nigeria.
- Christopher Ijeh, Sergeant, Nigeria Police Force.
- Demetrios Issaias, Assistant Superintendent, Cyprus Police Force.
- Leslie Leopold Johnson, Deputy Superintendent, Jamaica Police Force.
- Kakili Mwage, Detective Sergeant, Tanganyika Police Force.
- Amara Sellu David Kallon, Chief Inspector, Sierra Leone Police Force.
- John Joseph Kearney, Assistant Superintendent, Kenya Police Force.
- Francis Sawe arap Kipsoi, Inspector Grade 1, Kenya Police Force.
- Allan Morris Kirkham. Superintendent, Nyasaland Police Force.
- John Morgan Lewis, Inspector, Leeward Islands Police Force.
- Douglas George Lomax, Superintendent, Nyasaland Police Force.
- John Patrick McKnight, Superintendent, Cyprus Police Force.
- Mumina s/o Mbindio, Sergeant, Kenya Police Force.
- Musa Radia, Detective Sergeant, Tanganyika Police Force.
- Ernest Odunze, Sub-Inspector, Nigeria Police Force.
- Edward Pinhey, Assistant Superintendent, Cyprus Police Force.
- Geoffrey Claude Proctor, Superintendent, Sierra Leone Police Force.
- Ramazani Makenya, Detective Sergeant, Tanganyika Police Force.
- David James Gardiner Rose, MBE, Assistant Commissioner, British Guiana Police Force.
- Abdul Malik Abdul Sattar, Assistant Superintendent, Aden Police Force.
- Shimwezhi, Detective Sub-Inspector, Northern Rhodesia Police Force.
- Lai Singh, Assistant Superintendent, Fiji Police Force.
- Madan Singh, Assistant Superintendent, Tanganyika Police Force.
- Kiboit arap Tereito, Assistant Inspector, Kenya Police Force.
- Tito Mhalule, Sergeant-Major, Tanganyika Police Force.
- Neville Vincent Buckham Wilmshurst, Senior Superintendent, Nigeria Police Force.
- Reginald Fred Wilson, Inspector, Jamaica Police Force.
- Arthur Ernest Wiltshire, Deputy Commissioner, Aden Police Force.
- William Wright, Superintendent, Zanzibar Police Force.
- Megag Yunis, Inspector, Somaliland Police Force.

== Australia ==
=== Knight Bachelor ===
- Professor Edward Ford, OBE, MD, FRCP, Director of the School of Public Health and Tropical Medicine, Commonwealth Department of Health, University of Sydney.
- Tasman Hudson Eastwood Heyes, CBE, Secretary, Department of Immigration.
- Manuel Richard Hornibrook, OBE, of Brisbane. For services to the building industry in Australia.
- Alan Graeme Potter, Chairman of the Australian Jockey Club, Sydney.

=== Order of the Bath ===
==== Companion of the Order of the Bath (CB) ====
Military Division

- Air Vice-Marshal Alister Murray Murdoch, CBE, Royal Australian Air Force.

=== Order of Saint Michael and Saint George ===
==== Knight Commander of the Order of St Michael and St George (KCMG) ====
- Lieutenant-Colonel Sir Charles Bickerton Blackburn, OBE, MD, FRCP, Royal Australian Army Medical Corps (Retired), Chancellor of the University of Sydney. For services to Education and Medicine.

==== Companion of the Order of St Michael and St George (CMG) ====
- Vincent Charles Fairfax, of Double Bay, New South Wales. For public services.
- Geoffrey Holt Grimwade, Member of the Board of the Commonwealth Bank.
- Walter Scott, of Roseville, New South Wales. For services to Australian industry.
- Captain John Protheroe Williams, OBE, Chairman of the Australian Coastal Shipping Commission.

=== Order of the British Empire ===
==== Dame Commander of the Order of the British Empire (DBE) ====
Civil Division

- Frances Margaret Anderson (Judith Anderson), Actress.

==== Commander of the Order of the British Empire (CBE) ====
Military Division

Royal Australian Navy

- Rear-Admiral Galfry George Ormond Gatacre, DSO, DSC.

Australian Military Forces

- Major-General (temporary) Robert William Knights, OBE, (3/76), Australian Staff Corps.

Royal Australian Air Force

- Air Commodore Denis Archibald John Creal, OBE.

Civil Division

- John Francis Clack, Chairman of the New South Wales Division of the Australian Red Cross Society.
- Bertie Amos Neville Cole, of Molong, New South Wales. For services to Australian primary industry.
- Herbert John Goodes, OBE, Director-General, Department of Social Services.
- Laurence Rupert McIntyre, OBE, Her Majesty's Australian Ambassador to Indonesia.
- Harold Clive Newman, OBE, Commonwealth Auditor-General.
- Walter Albert Selle, of Epping, New South Wales. For services to Education.
- Vivian Charles Williams, MC, of Griffith, New South Wales. For services to irrigation research.

==== Officer of the Order of the British Empire (OBE) ====
Military Division

Royal Australian Navy

- Commander Harrie Glen Daniel Oliver.

Australian Military Forces

- Colonel Sydney Thomas Glyn Coleman (2/52), Australian Staff Corps.
- Colonel Richard Geoffrey Champion De Crespigny, ED, MB, BS, (4/31901), Royal Australian Army Medical Corps.
- Colonel Vincent Ernest Dowdy (2/51), Australian Staff Corps.

Royal Australian Air Force

- Group Captain Arthur Evan Lloyd Davies.
- Group Captain Geoffrey Douglas Marshall, AFC.

Civil Division

- Ernest Henry Aldis, Chief Engineer, Qantas Empire Airways Ltd.
- Andrew Thomson Bedford, MM, JP, of Coogee, New South Wales. For community service, particularly on behalf of ex-servicemen.
- Frank Thomas Boan, of Peppermint Grove, Western Australia. For honorary public services.
- Robert Frederick Bunting, MLC, of Lae, Territory of Papua and New Guinea. For services on behalf of ex-servicemen.
- Roy Ian Cameron, Assistant Secretary (Finance), Department of Air.
- John Patrick Cass, Member of the Australian Wheat Board.
- William Alexander Dargie, Member of the Commonwealth Art Advisory Board.
- George Joseph Evatt, Chairman of the Australian Canned Fruits Board.
- John Garfield Fussell, MBE, Secretary of the A.I.F. Canteens Fund Trust, 1927-59.
- James Reginald Halligan, Senior Commissioner, South Pacific Commission.
- Kenneth Thomas Hardy, formerly Chairman of the Australian Wine Board.
- Alfred Phillips Hosking, Honorary Vice-President of the Victorian Branch of the Royal Commonwealth Society.
- Samuel Landau, First Assistant Secretary, Department of Defence.
- William Henry Leng, Assistant Secretary (Finance), Department of the Army.
- Douglas Macinnis, MLC, Director of the Department of Lands, Surveys and Mines, Territory of Papua and New Guinea.
- Godfrey Alfred Rattigan, Deputy Secretary, Department of Trade.
- The Honourable Leicester Birkenhead Saddington, Member of the Legislative Council of New South Wales. For public and political services.
- Douglas Alexander Stewart, of St. Ives, New South Wales. Author and writer.
- Reginald Henry Donald White, Assistant Director-General (Administration and Finance), Commonwealth Department of Health.

==== Member of the Order of the British Empire (MBE) ====
Military Division

Royal Australian Navy

- Communication Lieutenant-Commander William Robert Phaup.
- Lieutenant-Commander (S.D.) Stuart Wheeler.

Australian Military Forces

- The Reverend Noel Frederick Goodsell, Chaplain to the Forces, Third Class (2/50472), Royal Australian Army Chaplains' Department.
- Lieutenant (Quartermaster) Thomas Edward Guest (3/420), Royal Australian Artillery.
- Lieutenant-Colonel (temporary) Robert Allan McLean (3/37605), Royal Australian Army Ordnance Corps.
- Captain (Quartermaster) Ronald David McNamara (2/310), Royal Australian Infantry Corps.
- Major (temporary) Arthur Richard Milne (3/92042), Royal Australian Infantry Corps.
- 2/1739 Warrant Officer Class I John Milton Newton, Royal Corps of Australian Electrical and Mechanical Engineers.
- 2/1883 Warrant Officer Class I James Verdi Orr, Royal Australian Infantry Corps.
- 2/932 Warrant Officer Class II Victor Phillip Svenson, Royal Australian Infantry Corps.

Royal Australian Air Force

- Acting Flight Lieutenant Bruce Kempton Drinkwater (042036).
- Warrant Officer Robert Alan Graham (A.223).

Civil Division

- Lawrence Fenton Archibald, Commissioner of the Australian Air League.
- John Mayston Béchervaise, Officer-in-Charge, Mawson Station, Antarctic Division, Department of External Affairs.
- Ernest James Brunckhurst, Chief Maintenance Engineer, Trans Australia Airlines.
- Hugh Victor Spencer Burgoyne, of Enfield, New South Wales. For public services.
- Alice Marjorie Charlton, Honorary Australian Treasurer, Girl Guides Association of Australia.
- James Stewart Crocker, of Broken Hill, New South Wales. For charitable services.
- Gladys Gordon Everett, of Wahroonga, New South Wales. For services to Education.
- Captain Frank Fischer, DFC, Chief Check and Training Captain, Trans-Australia Airlines.
- David Scott Graham, in recognition of his services as Civil Aviation Liaison Officer, Department of Civil Aviation, during Royal visits to Australia.
- John Sydney Hunter, of Norwood, South Australia. For services to disabled ex-servicemen.
- William Jamieson, Honorary Secretary of The Seventh Battalion, A.I.F. Association.
- Eric James Kydd, Chief Maintenance Engineer, Qantas Empire Airways Limited.
- William Edward Brock Macleod, of Wallan Wallan, Victoria. For services to primary production.
- Augusta Emma McCutchan, of East Kew, Victoria. For services to war widows.
- Duncan Francis Medhurst, of Armidale, New South Wales, formerly a Mail Contractor to the Postmaster-General's Department.
- Emily Florence Miller, Matron of Grafton Base Hospital, 1934–1959.
- John William Reilly, in recognition of his services as Transport Officer, Department of Supply, during Royal visits to Australia.
- Lucius Lawrence D'Arcy Richardson, of Darwin, Northern Territory. For public services.
- Gwendoline Ringland, of Cremorne, New South Wales. For services to the Blind.
- Simone Antoinette Fearnley-Sander, of Montague Bay, Tasmania. For public and charitable services.
- Stanley Claud Thomas, JP, of Hampton, Victoria. For services to ex-servicemen.
- Percival Lloyd Williams, of Elsternwick, Victoria. For services to Education and Sport.
- Elizabeth Dorothy Wilson, of Deepdene, Victoria. For charitable work for aged people.
- Naomi Wolinski, JP, of Neutral Bay, New South Wales. For services to Women's Sport.
- George Herbert Bennett-Wood, Honorary Secretary of the United Kingdom Services and Ex-Services Welfare Association, Sydney, New South Wales.

=== British Empire Medal (BEM) ===
Military Division

Royal Australian Navy

- Chief Engine Room Artificer Thomas Gilbert Code, R. 31271.
- Chief Engine Room Artificer John Daniel Cottrell, DSM, R. 51022.

Australian Military Forces

- 4/1843 Sergeant Bertram Charles Addington, Royal Australian Army Provost Corps.
- 5/153 Sergeant Thomas Boreham, Royal Australian Artillery.
- 3/742 Staff-Sergeant Francis William Dean, Royal Australian Infantry Corps.
- 3/45482 Staff-Sergeant Hugh Wilson Graham, Royal Australian Engineers.
- 2/1471 Sergeant Ronald Francis Platt, Royal Australian Armoured Corps.
- 2/75802 Sergeant Frederick David Reeves, Royal Australian Infantry Corps.
- 3/82533 Staff-Sergeant (temporary) Maurice Vivian, Royal Australian Infantry Corps.
- 2/951 Sergeant Cyril James Wilson, Royal Australian Infantry Corps.

Royal Australian Air Force

- A.31609 Sergeant George Clifton Stevenson.

Civil Division

- William Berlin, Superintendent of Stores, Department of Works, Northern Territory.
- David Gillingham, Senior Works Supervisor, Department of Works, Townsville.
- Angus Donald McDonald, Works Supervisor, Department of Works, Rabaul.
- Ian Malcolm McRae, Works Supervisor, Department of Works, Northern Territory.
- Henry Wark, Ganger, Australian Capital Territory.

=== Royal Red Cross (RRC) ===
==== Associate of the Royal Red Cross (ARRC) ====
- Captain Joan Crouch (F2/5), Royal Australian Army Nursing Corps.

=== Air Force Cross (AFC) ===
Royal Australian Air Force

- Group Captain Charles Frederick Read, DFC.
- Squadron Leader Basil Francis Neil Rachinger, DFC, (035055).
- Flight Lieutenant Brian Edmund Goy (033210).

=== Queen's Commendation for Valuable Service in the Air ===
Royal Australian Air Force

- Wing Commander John Charles Thorp (022082).
- Squadron Leader Edward Austin Turner (033165).
- Flight Lieutenant John Allerton Jacobs (034223).

== Ghana ==
=== Order of Saint Michael and Saint George ===
==== Companion of the Order of St Michael and St George (CMG) ====
- Geoffrey Henry Cecil Bing, QC, Attorney-General.

=== Order of the British Empire ===
==== Officer of the Order of the British Empire (OBE) ====
Civil Division

- Frederick Ernest Bronger Clark, Director of Posts and Telecommunications.
- Stanley Walker Cooper, FRCS(Ed.), Surgical Specialist, Medical Service.
- James McCabe, Assistant Commissioner of Police.
- Robert Nicholas Manning Milton, Permanent Secretary, Administrative Service.
- David Scott, MD, Specialist Epidemiologist, Medical Service.

==== Member of the Order of the British Empire (MBE) ====
Military Division

- Major Francis David Ingle (102708), 1st East Anglian Regiment (Royal Norfolk and Suffolk); seconded to the Ghana Army.
- Major (Quartermaster) Ernest John Van Walwyk (355612), Corps of Royal Engineers; seconded to the Ghana Army.

Civil Division

- Edward Gordon Butterworth, formerly Trade Commissioner, Ghana High Commissioner's Office, London.
- Ethel Mary Forryan, Private Secretary, Ghana High Commissioner's Office, London.
- Euphemia Wilhelmina Grace Gladstone, Principal Education Officer, Ministry of Education and Information.
- Gilbert Anthony Saunders, Publications Officer, Ghana Information Services.

=== British Empire Medal (BEM) ===
Military Division

- 22560282 Staff-Sergeant Martin Alfred Sydney Kinchenton, Corps of Royal Engineers; serving with the Ghana Army.

== Federation of Rhodesia and Nyasaland ==
=== Knight Bachelor ===
- Anthony Paul Grafftey-Smith, CBE, TD, Governor of the Bank of Rhodesia and Nyasaland.

=== Order of Saint Michael and Saint George ===
==== Companion of the Order of St Michael and St George (CMG) ====
- Neville Rennie Bertram, MBE, formerly Secretary for Commerce and Industry.
- Thomas Angus Lyall Paton. For services rendered in connection with the construction of the Kariba Dam.

=== Order of the British Empire ===
==== Knight Commander of the Order of the British Empire (KBE) ====
Civil Division

- Duncan Law Anderson, CBE, TD, Chairman of the Federal Power Board.

==== Commander of the Order of the British Empire (CBE) ====
Military Division

- Group Captain Harold Hawkins, AFC, Royal Rhodesian Air Force.

Civil Division

- Colonel Gerald Edward Wells, OBE, ED, Clerk of the Federal Assembly.

==== Officer of the Order of the British Empire (OBE) ====
Military Division

- Colonel Rodney Ray Jensen Putterill, Staff Corps, Federal Army.

Civil Division

- Thomas Kenneth Aldersley Douglas. For services rendered in connection with the construction of the Kariba Dam.
- Cessey Morris Harris, JP. For public services at Bulawayo, Southern Rhodesia.
- Edward Serrurier Newson, Joint General Manager, British South Africa Company.
- Maurice Holland Webster, MB, ChB, in recognition of his work in providing a health service at Kariba during the period of the construction of the Kariba Dam.

==== Member of the Order of the British Empire (MBE) ====
Military Division

- Major Kenneth Gordon Harvey, DSO, 2nd Battalion, The Royal Rhodesia Regiment.

Civil Division

- Thomas Vevers-Redman Barbour, Personal Assistant to the Federal High Commissioner in London.
- Nancy Tena Barker, Matron of the Ndola Hospital, Northern Rhodesia.
- Edward Jones Hougaard, Headmaster of Churchill School.
- Pieter Terblanche Van der Walt, formerly Federal Controller of Printing and Stationery, Salisbury.
- Eva Wilkin, formerly a member of the staff of the Statistical Bureau, Federal Ministry of Finance.

=== British Empire Medal (BEM) ===
Military Division

- Sergeant Hugh Ernest Van Oppen, 1st Battalion, The Royal Rhodesia Regiment.

Civil Division

- Sydney Jameson Matinga, Principal Office Assistant, Junior Executive Division, Federal Department of Immigration, Nyasaland.

=== Air Force Cross (AFC) ===
- Squadron Leader Charles Henry Paxton, Royal Rhodesian Air Force.
