= Egunyu Janepher Nantume =

Ugandan politician

Honourable Egunyu Janepher Nantume
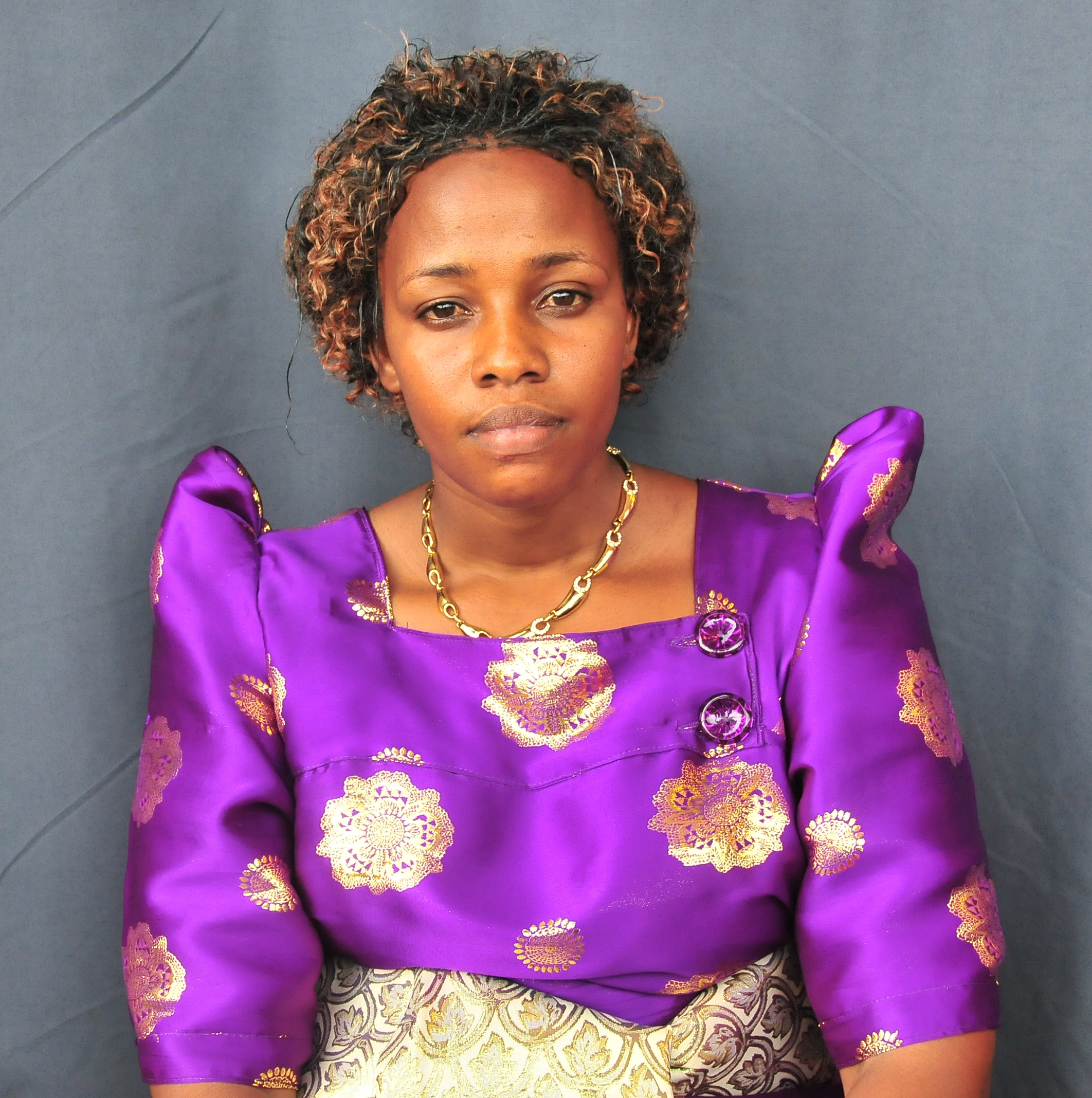
- Born: 1978-12-01
- Citizenship: Ugandan
- Education: Busoga University, Kyambogo University
- Occupations: Social Worker, Legislator
- Employer: Parliament of Uganda
- Political party: National Resistance Movement

Engunyu Janepher Nantume (born 1 December 1978) is a Ugandan politician, legislator and a social worker by profession. She represented the people of Buvuma Islands county, Buvuma District in the parliament of Uganda. She is a member of the National Resistance Movement (NRM) party, the ruling political party in Uganda under the chairmanship of Yoweri Kaguta Museveni, the president of the republic of Uganda.

== Early life and education ==
Engunyu was born on 1 December 1978. She started her primary school education from Natteta primary school where she sat her primary leaving examinations (PLE) in 1990. She later enrolled at St Pontiano, Kangulumira for her O-level education and sat her Uganda Certificate of Education (UCE) in 1995. She later joined St. Mathias Kalemba senior secondary school for her A-level education and sat her Uganda Advanced Certificate of Education (UACE) in 1998. She thereafter joined kyambogo University where she pursued a diploma in education in 2000, and later on joined Busoga University where she graduated with a bachelor's degree in social works and social administration (B.SWASA) in 2011. She is currently pursuing a master's degree in public administration from Islamic University in Uganda (IUIU)

== Career ==
Egunyu served as vice chairperson Buvuma District local government in 2011.

She was also a secondary school teacher at Jinja secondary school and Iganga progressive king of kings from 2000 to 2004.

She served as vice chairperson committee on agriculture, animal industry and fisheries from 2011 to 2013

Egunyu served as member of the parliament of Uganda from 2011 to 2021. In 2021 general elections, she contested again for Women representative for Buvuma district in the parliament Uganda as an independent candidate and she lost to Susan Mugabi Nakaziba of Nation Unity Platform.

In Parliament, she served on the committee on education and sports and she has served as chairperson of the committee on human rights.

She was member of the National Resistance Movement (NRM) parliamentary caucus and the Buganda caucus

She is a full member of two professional bodies; the Uganda National Teachers Union (UNATU) and the Uganda Red Cross Society

== Miscellaneous ==
Egunyu's bodyguard shot dead the village National Resistance Movement chairman of kiziba village, Bugaya sub county for allegedly trying to distract Egunyu from addressing village members.

As chairperson committee on human rights, Egunyu has advocated for the observance of human rights, case in point being the investigation into torture in safe houses run by security agencies where the committee clashed with security minister general Elly Tumwine for frustrating the committee's efforts of unearthing the truth.

== See also ==
- List of members of the tenth Parliament of Uganda
- List of members of the ninth Parliament of Uganda
- National Resistance Movement
- Buvuma District
- Parliament of Uganda
- Robert Ndugwa Migadde
