= Protectorate of Uganda =

British protectorate in Africa from 1894 to 1962

- 1894–1962
- Flag (1914–1962) Badge
- Anthem: God Save the Queen (1894–1901, 1952–1962); God Save the King (1901–1952)
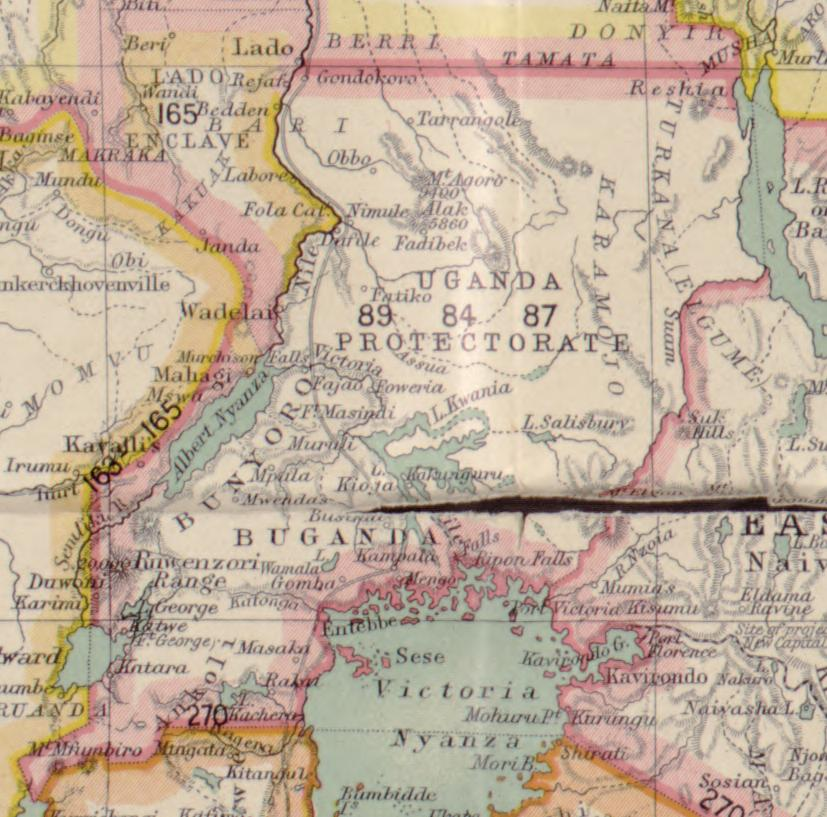
- Map of Protectorate of Uganda in 1906
- Status: British protectorate
- Capital: Entebbe
- Common languages: English (official); Luganda, Swahili, Southern Luo, Nkore widely spoken
- Religion: Christianity, Islam
- Legislature: Legislative Council
- Historical era: New Imperialism
  - Protectorate established: 18 June 1894
  - Self government: 1961
  - Independence: 9 October 1962

Population
  - 1911: 2,466,325
  - 1921: 2,854,608
  - 1931: 3,542,281
  - 1948: 4,958,520
  - 1959: 6,449,558
- Currency: Cowrie (precolonial era–1906); East African rupee (1906–1920); East African florin (1920–1921); East African shilling (1921–1962)
- ISO 3166 code: UG
Preceded by	Succeeded by
Imperial British East Africa Company	Dominion of Uganda
- Today part of: Kenya; South Sudan; Uganda

The Protectorate of Uganda was a protectorate of the British Empire from 1894 to 1962. In 1893 the Imperial British East Africa Company transferred its administration rights of territory consisting mainly of the Kingdom of Buganda to the British government.

In 1894 the Uganda Protectorate was established, and the territory was extended beyond the borders of Buganda to an area that roughly corresponds to that of present-day Uganda.

== History ==
=== Background ===
In the mid-1880s, the Kingdom of Buganda was divided between four religious factions – Adherents of Uganda's Native Religion, Catholics, Protestants and Muslims – each vying for political control. In 1888, Mwanga II was ousted in a coup led by the Muslim faction, who installed Kalema as leader. The following year, a Protestant and Catholic coalition formed to remove Kalema and return Mwanga II to power. This coalition secured an alliance with the Imperial British East Africa Company (IBEAC), and succeeded in ousting Kalema and reinstating Mwanga in 1890.

The IBEAC sent Frederick Lugard to Uganda in 1890 as its chief representative and to help maintain the peace between the competing factions. In 1891, Mwanga concluded a treaty with Lugard whereby Mwanga would place his land and tributary states under the protection of the IBEAC.

In 1892, having subdued the Muslim faction, the Protestants and Catholics resumed their struggle for supremacy which led to civil war. That same year, the British government extended their support for the IBEAC to remain in Uganda until 1893. Despite strong opposition to getting involved in Uganda, the government felt that withdrawal of British influence would lead to war and the threat of a fellow European power encroaching on Britain's sphere of influence in East Africa it shared with Germany in 1890.

On 31 March 1893, the IBEAC formally ended its involvement in Uganda. Missionaries, led by Alfred Tucker, lobbied the British government to take over the administration of Uganda in place of the IBEAC, arguing that British withdrawal would lead to a continuance of the civil war between the different religious factions. Shortly after, Sir Gerald Portal, a representative of the British government on the ground in Uganda, proposed a plan of double chieftainships – whereby every chieftainship would have one Protestant and one Catholic chief. On 19 April 1893, the British government and the chiefs of Uganda signed a treaty giving effect to this plan.

On 18 June 1894, the British government declared that Uganda would come under British protection as a Protectorate.

=== 1894–1901 ===
The Uganda Agreement of 1900 solidified the power of the largely Protestant 'Bakungu' client-chiefs, led by Kagwa. London sent only a few officials to administer the country, relying primarily on the 'Bakungu' chiefs. For decades they were preferred because of their political skills, their Christianity, their friendly relations with the British, their ability to collect taxes, and the proximity of Entebbe (the Ugandan colonial capital) to the Buganda capital. By the 1920s, the British administrators were more confident and had less need for military or administrative support. Colonial officials taxed cash crops produced by the peasants. There was popular discontent among the Baganda rank-and-file, which weakened the position of their leaders. In 1912, Kagwa moved to solidify 'Bakungu' power by proposing a second 'Lukiko' for Buganda with himself as president and the 'Bakungu' as a sort of hereditary aristocracy. British officials vetoed the idea when they discovered widespread popular opposition. Instead, British officials began some reforms and attempted to make the 'Lukiko' a genuine representative assembly.

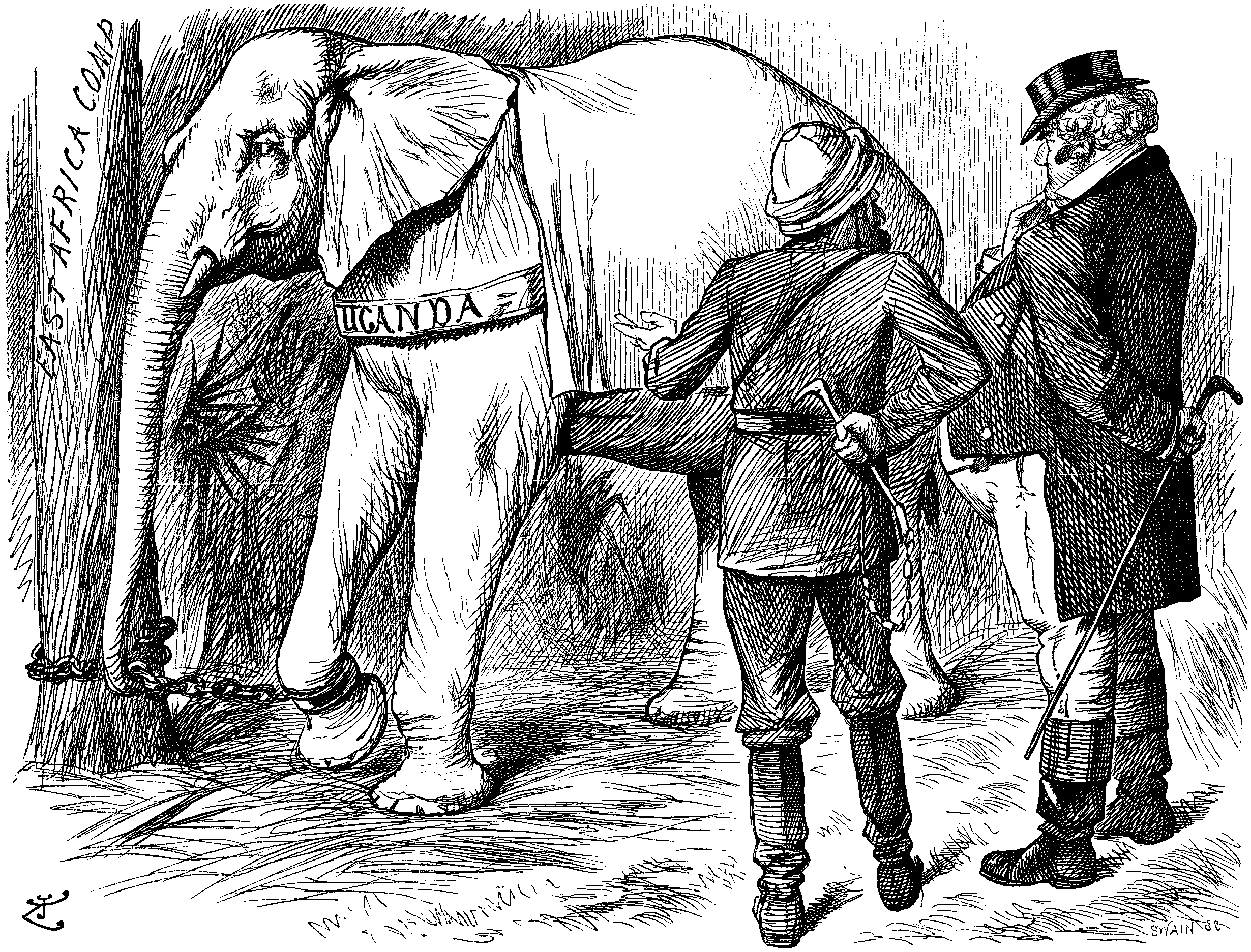
Punch cartoon depicting Uganda personified as a White elephant which the East Africa Company is attempting to sell to Britain (1892)

Although momentous change occurred during the colonial era in Uganda, some characteristics of late-nineteenth-century African society survived to reemerge at the time of independence. The status of Protectorate had significantly different consequences for Uganda than had the region been made a colony like neighbouring Kenya, insofar as Uganda retained a degree of self-government that would have otherwise been limited under a full colonial administration.

Colonial rule, however, affected local economic systems dramatically, in part because the first concern of the British was financial. Quelling the 1897 Sudanese mutiny (see Uganda before 1900) under the leadership of protectorate commissioner George Wilson CB had been costly—units of the British Indian Army had been transported to Uganda at considerable expense. The new commissioner of Uganda in 1900, Sir Harry H. Johnston, had orders to establish an efficient administration and to levy taxes as quickly as possible. Johnston approached the chiefs in Uganda with offers of jobs in the colonial administration in return for their collaboration.

The chiefs were more interested in preserving Uganda as a self-governing entity, continuing the royal line of Kabakas, and securing private land tenure for themselves and their supporters. Hard bargaining ensued, but the chiefs ended up with everything they wanted, including one-half of all the land in Buganda. The half left to the British as "Crown Land" was later found to be largely swamp and scrub.

Johnston's Uganda Agreement of 1900 imposed a tax on huts and guns, designated the chiefs as tax collectors, and testified to the continued alliance of British and Baganda interests. The British signed much less generous treaties with the other kingdoms (Toro in 1900, Ankole in 1901, and Bunyoro in 1933) without the provision of large-scale private land tenure. The smaller chiefdoms of Busoga were ignored.

=== Buganda administrators ===
The Baganda immediately offered their services to the British as administrators over their recently conquered neighbours, an offer which was attractive to the economy-minded colonial administration. Baganda agents fanned out as local tax collectors and labour organizers in areas such as Kigezi, Mbale, and, significantly, Bunyoro. This sub-imperialism and Ganda cultural chauvinism was resented by the people being administered.

Wherever they went, Baganda insisted on the exclusive use of their language, Luganda, and they planted bananas as the only proper food worth eating. They regarded their traditional dress—long cotton gowns called kanzus—as civilized; all else was barbarian. They also encouraged and engaged in mission work, attempting to convert locals to their form of Christianity or Islam. In some areas, the resulting backlash aided the efforts of religious rivals — for example, Catholics won converts in areas where oppressive rule was identified with a Protestant Muganda chief.

The people of Bunyoro were particularly aggrieved, having fought the Baganda and the British; having a substantial section of their heartland annexed to Buganda as the "lost counties", and finally having "arrogant" Baganda administrators issuing orders, collecting taxes, and forcing unpaid labour. In 1907 the Banyoro rose in a rebellion called nyangire, or "refusing", and succeeded in having the Baganda subimperial agents withdrawn.

Meanwhile, in 1901 the completion of the Uganda Railway from the coast at Mombasa to the Lake Victoria port of Kisumu moved colonial authorities to encourage the growth of cash crops to help pay the railway's operating costs. Another result of the railway construction was the 1902 decision to transfer the eastern section of the Uganda Protectorate to the Kenya Colony, then called the East Africa Protectorate, to keep the entire line under one local colonial administration. Because the railway experienced cost overruns in Kenya, the British decided to justify its exceptional expense and pay its operating costs by introducing large-scale European settlement in a vast tract of land that became a centre of cash-crop agriculture known as the "White Highlands". A major part of the territory eventually left out of the "East Africa Protectorate" was the Uganda Scheme, in which the British Empire offered to create a Jewish nation-state. The offer was made to the Zionist movement which rejected it, refusing to accept anything other than the ancient Land of Israel.

In many areas of Uganda, by contrast, agricultural production was placed in the hands of Africans, if they responded to the opportunity. Cotton was the crop of choice, largely because of pressure by the British Cotton Growing Association, textile manufacturers who urged the colonies to provide raw materials for British mills. This was done by cash cropping the land. Even the CMS joined the effort by launching the Uganda Company (managed by a former missionary) to promote cotton planting and to buy and transport the produce.

Buganda, with its strategic location on the lakeside, reaped the benefits of cotton growing. The advantages of this crop were quickly recognized by the Baganda chiefs who had newly acquired freehold estates, which came to be known as mailo because they were measured in square miles. In 1905 the initial baled cotton export was valued at £200; in 1906, £1,000; in 1907; £11,000; and in 1908, £52,000. By 1915 the value of cotton exports had climbed to £369,000, and Britain was able to end its subsidy of colonial administration in Uganda, while in Kenya the white settlers required continuing subsidies by the home government.

The income generated by cotton sales made the Uganda kingdom relatively prosperous, compared with the rest of colonial Uganda, although before World War I cotton was also being grown in the eastern regions of Busoga, Lango, and Teso. Many Baganda spent their new earnings on imported clothing, bicycles, metal roofing, and even cars. They also invested in their children's education. The Christian missions emphasized literacy skills, and African converts quickly learned to read and write. By 1911 two popular journals, Ebifa (News) and Munno (Your Friend), were published monthly in Luganda.

Heavily supported by African funds, new schools were soon turning out graduating classes at Mengo High School, St. Mary's Kisubi, Namilyango, Gayaza, and King's College Budo — all in Buganda. The chief minister of the Buganda kingdom, Sir Apollo Kaggwa, personally awarded a bicycle to the top graduate at King's College Budo, together with the promise of a government job. The schools, in fact, had inherited the educational function formerly performed in the Kabaka's palace, where generations of young pages had been trained to become chiefs. Now the qualifications sought were literacy and skills, including typing and English translation.

Two important principles of precolonial political life carried over into the colonial era: clientage, whereby ambitious younger officeholders attached themselves to older high-ranking chiefs, and generational conflict, which resulted when the younger generation sought to expel their elders from office in order to replace them. After World War I, the younger aspirants to high office in Buganda became impatient with the seemingly perpetual tenure of Sir Apollo and his contemporaries, who lacked many of the skills that members of the younger generation had acquired through schooling. Calling themselves the Young Baganda Association, members of the new generation attached themselves to the young Kabaka, Daudi Chwa, who was the figurehead ruler of Buganda under indirect rule. But Kabaka Daudi never gained real political power, and after a short and frustrating reign, he died at the relatively young age of forty-three.

=== First World War era military forces ===
Early on in the Protectorate's history of occupation the British colonial government had recognised the need for a local defence force. In 1895 the British colonial armed force in the Protectorate was the Uganda Rifles, who were formed as an internal security force (i.e. keeping the peace in tribal areas rather than defending against external aggression). In the late nineteenth century the local defence force was largely composed of Sudanese troops brought in by the British, these troops were commanded by a mix of British and Sudanese officers, local tribes were not that evident in this force defending the interests of the Imperial British East Africa Company. Unfortunately the Sudanese grew resentful of their conditions of service and the Uganda Rifles mutinied in 1897. On 1 January 1902 the somewhat irregular armed force in Uganda was reformed (with far fewer Sudanese and more local tribes in its ranks) and re-titled the 4th Battalion the King's African Rifles (KAR). It was with this defensive structure that was in place at the outbreak of hostilities in 1914, although there had been cuts in the KAR in 1911 stretching the force structure of the regiment even further. By the end of the Great War the Ugandan contingent in the KAR had grown considerably and they had become an effective fighting force built out of Ugandans rather than outsiders and had enjoyed success against the German forces in East Africa. The Protectorate also developed an emergency response for the intelligence collection on German activities and performing political-military liaison with allies in East Africa; according to UK National Archive records this organisation (known as the Uganda Intelligence Department) was about 20 strong and included European officers and African soldiers.

Most of this recruitment was done from the northern part of the protectorate especially the Acholi sub-region. The British colonial administration had also fought with the Lamogi clan of the Acholi people in what that culminated in to the Lamogi Rebellion.

=== 1920 to 1961 ===
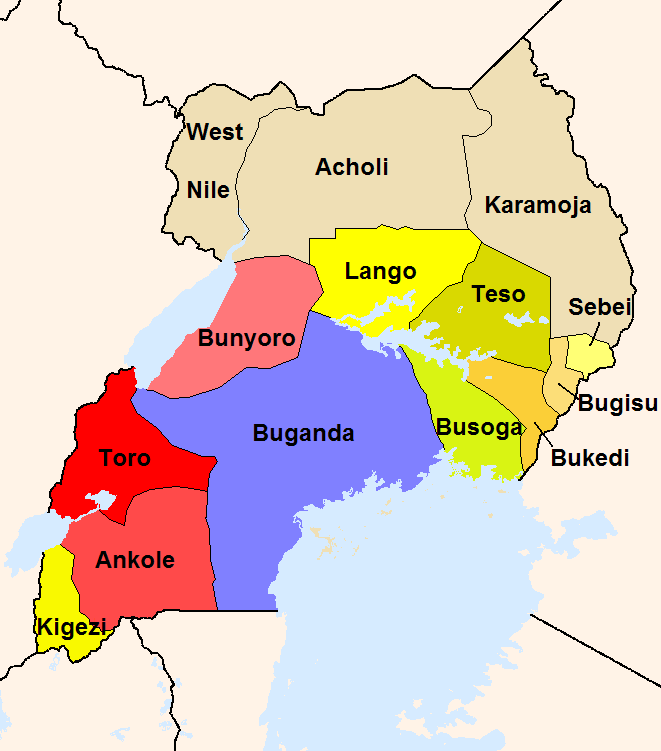
Subdivisions under the Ugandan Protectorate (1926 borders). (Click area to go to article.) The areas in red and blue hues had centralized kingdoms prior to British arrival, while the colonialists introduced centralized rule on the Baganda model to areas in yellow. Areas in khaki never had centralized kingdoms.

Far more promising as a source of political support were the British colonial officers, who welcomed the typing and translation skills of school graduates and advanced the careers of their favourites. The contest was decided after World War I, when an influx of British ex-military officers, now serving as district commissioners, began to feel that self-government was an obstacle to good government. Specifically, they accused Sir Apollo and his generation of inefficiency, abuse of power, and failure to keep adequate financial accounts—charges that were not hard to document.

Sir Apollo resigned in 1926, at about the same time that a host of elderly Baganda chiefs were replaced by a new generation of officeholders. The Buganda treasury was also audited that year for the first time. Although it was not a nationalist organization, the Young Baganda Association claimed to represent popular African dissatisfaction with the old order. As soon as the younger Baganda had replaced the older generation in office, however, their objections to privilege accompanying power ceased. The pattern persisted in Ugandan politics up to and after independence.

The commoners, who had been labouring on the cotton estates of the chiefs before World War I, did not remain servile. As time passed, they bought small parcels of land from their erstwhile landlords. This land fragmentation was aided by the British, who in 1927 forced the chiefs to limit severely the rents and obligatory labour they could demand from their tenants. Thus the oligarchy of landed chiefs who had emerged with the Uganda Agreement of 1900 declined in importance, and agricultural production shifted to independent smallholders, who grew cotton, and later coffee, for the export market.

Unlike Tanganyika, which was devastated during the prolonged fighting between Britain and Germany in the East African Campaign of World War I, Uganda prospered from wartime agricultural production. After the population losses from disease during the era of conquest and at the turn of the century (particularly the devastating sleeping sickness epidemic of 1900–1906), Uganda's population was growing again. Even the 1930s depression seemed to affect smallholder cash farmers in Uganda less severely than it did the white settler producers in Kenya. Ugandans simply grew their own food until rising prices made export crops attractive again.

Two issues continued to create grievance through the 1930s and 1940s. The colonial government strictly regulated the buying and processing of cash crops, setting prices and reserving the role of intermediary for Asians, who were thought to be more efficient. The British and Asians firmly repelled African attempts to break into cotton ginning. In addition, on the Asian-owned sugar plantations established in the 1920s, labour for sugar-cane and other cash crops was increasingly provided by migrants from peripheral areas of Uganda and even from outside Uganda.

=== Independence ===
In 1949, discontented Baganda rioted and burned down the houses of pro-government chiefs. The rioters had three demands: the right to bypass government price controls on the export sales of cotton, the removal of the Asian monopoly over cotton ginning, and the right to have their own representatives in local government replace chiefs appointed by the British. They were critical as well of the young Kabaka, Frederick Walugembe Mutesa II (also known as "King Freddie" or "Kabaka Freddie"), for his inattention to the needs of his people. The British governor, Sir John Hall, regarded the riots as the work of communist-inspired agitators and rejected the suggested reforms.

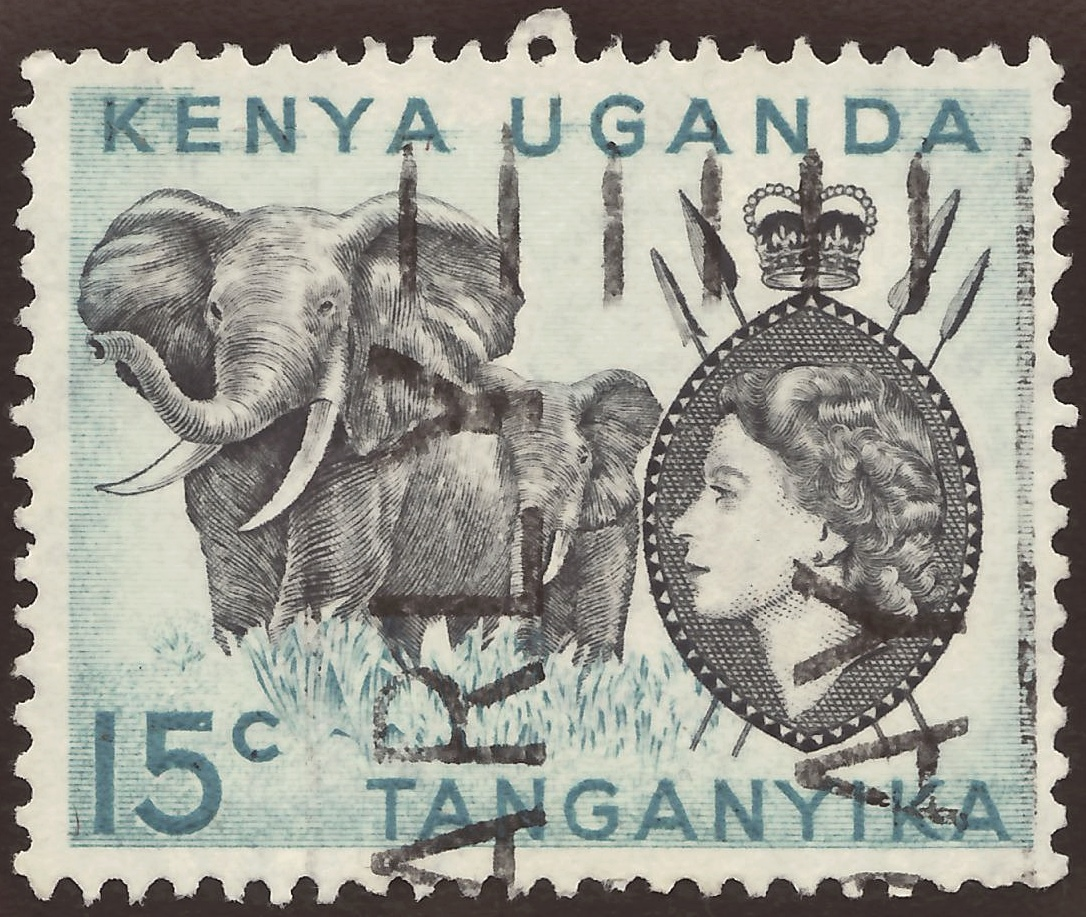
Stamp of British East Africa with a portrait of Queen Elizabeth II

Far from leading the people into confrontation, Uganda's would-be agitators were slow to respond to popular discontent. Nevertheless, the Uganda African Farmers Union, founded by I.K. Musazi in 1947, was blamed for the riots and was banned by the British. Musazi's Uganda National Congress replaced the farmers union in 1952 when it was set up with Abu Mayanja as its first Secretary General, but because the Congress remained a casual discussion group more than an organized political party, it stagnated and came to an end just two years after its inception.

Meanwhile, the British began to move ahead of the Ugandans in preparing for independence. The effects of Britain's postwar withdrawal from India, the march of nationalism in West Africa, and a more liberal philosophy in the Colonial Office geared toward future self-rule all began to be felt in Uganda. The embodiment of these issues arrived in 1952 in the person of a new and energetic reformist governor, Sir Andrew Cohen (formerly undersecretary for African affairs in the Colonial Office).

Cohen set about preparing Uganda for independence. On the economic side, he removed obstacles to African cotton ginning, rescinded price discrimination against African-grown coffee, encouraged cooperatives, and established the Uganda Development Corporation to promote and finance new projects. On the political side, he reorganized the Legislative Council, which had consisted of an unrepresentative selection of interest groups heavily favouring the European community, to include African representatives elected from districts throughout Uganda. This system became a prototype for the future Parliament of Uganda.

== Power politics in Buganda ==
The prospect of elections caused a sudden proliferation of new political parties. This development alarmed the old-guard leaders within the Ugandan kingdoms, because they realized that the centre of power would be at the national level. The spark that ignited wider opposition to Governor Cohen's reforms was a 1953 speech in London in which the secretary of state for colonies referred to the possibility of a federation of the three East African territories (Kenya, Uganda, and Tanganyika), similar to that established in Rhodesia and Nyasaland.

Many Ugandans were aware of the Central African Federation of Rhodesia and Nyasaland (later Zimbabwe, Zambia, and Malawi) and its domination by white settler interests. Ugandans deeply feared the prospect of an East African federation dominated by the settlers of Kenya, which was then in the midst of the bitter Mau Mau uprising. They had vigorously resisted a similar suggestion by the 1930 Hilton Young Commission. Confidence in Cohen vanished just as the Governor was preparing to urge Buganda to recognize that its special status would have to be sacrificed in the interests of a new and larger nation-state.

Kabaka Mutesa II, who had been regarded by his subjects as uninterested in their welfare, now refused to cooperate with Cohen's plan for an integrated Buganda. Instead, he demanded that Buganda be separated from the rest of the protectorate and transferred to Foreign Office jurisdiction. Cohen's response to this crisis was to deport the Kabaka to a comfortable exile in London. His forced departure made the Kabaka an instant martyr in the eyes of the Baganda, whose latent separatism and anticolonial sentiments set off a storm of protest. Cohen's action had backfired, and he could find no one among the Baganda prepared or able to mobilize support for his schemes. After two frustrating years of unrelenting Ganda hostility and obstruction, Cohen was forced to reinstate Kabaka Mutesa II.

The negotiations leading to the Kabaka's return had an outcome similar to the negotiations of Commissioner Johnston in 1900; although appearing to satisfy the British, they were a resounding victory for the Baganda. Cohen secured the Kabaka's agreement not to oppose independence within the larger Ugandan framework. Not only was the Kabaka reinstated in return, but for the first time since 1889, the monarch was given the power to appoint and dismiss his chiefs (Buganda government officials) instead of acting as a mere figurehead while they conducted the affairs of government.

The Kabaka's new power was cloaked in the misleading claim that he would be only a "constitutional monarch", while in fact he was a leading player in deciding how Uganda would be governed. A new grouping of Baganda calling themselves "the King's Friends" rallied to the Kabaka's defence. They were conservative, fiercely loyal to Buganda as a kingdom, and willing to entertain the prospect of participation in an independent Uganda only if it were headed by the Kabaka as head of state. Baganda politicians who did not share this vision or who were opposed to the "King's Friends" found themselves branded as the "King's Enemies", which meant political and social ostracism.

The major exception to this rule were the Roman Catholic Baganda who had formed their own party, the Democratic Party (DP), led by Benedicto Kiwanuka. Many Catholics had felt excluded from the Protestant-dominated establishment in Buganda ever since Lugard's Maxim had turned the tide in 1892. The Kabaka had to be Protestant, and he was invested in a coronation ceremony modelled on that of British monarchs (who are invested by the Church of England's Archbishop of Canterbury) that took place at the main Protestant church. Religion and politics were equally inseparable in the other kingdoms throughout Uganda. The DP had Catholic as well as other adherents and was probably the best organized of all the parties preparing for elections. It had printing presses and the backing of the popular newspaper, Munno, which was published at the St. Mary's Kisubi mission.

Elsewhere in Uganda, the emergence of the Kabaka as a political force provoked immediate hostility. Political parties and local interest groups were riddled with divisions and rivalries, but they shared one concern: they were determined not to be dominated by Buganda. In 1960 a political organizer from Lango, Milton Obote, seized the initiative and formed a new party, the Uganda People's Congress (UPC), as a coalition of all those outside the Roman Catholic-dominated DP who opposed Buganda hegemony.

The steps Cohen had initiated to bring about the independence of a unified Ugandan state had led to a polarization between factions from Buganda and those opposed to its domination. Buganda's population in 1959 was 2 million, out of Uganda's total of 6 million. Even discounting the many non-Baganda resident in Buganda, there were at least 1 million people who owed allegiance to the Kabaka — too many to be overlooked or shunted aside, but too few to dominate the country as a whole.

At the London Conference of 1960, it was obvious that Buganda autonomy and a strong unitary government were incompatible, but no compromise emerged, and the decision on the form of government was postponed. The British announced that elections would be held in March 1961 for "responsible government", the next-to-last stage of preparation before the formal granting of independence. It was assumed that those winning the election would gain valuable experience in office, preparing them for the probable responsibility of governing after independence.

In Buganda the "King's Friends" urged a total boycott of the election because their attempts to secure promises of future autonomy had been rebuffed. Consequently, when the voters went to the polls throughout Uganda to elect eighty-two National Assembly members, in Buganda only the Roman Catholic supporters of the DP braved severe public pressure and voted, capturing twenty of Buganda's twenty-one allotted seats. This artificial situation gave the DP a majority of seats, although they had a minority of 416,000 votes nationwide versus 495,000 for the UPC. Benedicto Kiwanuka became the new chief minister of Uganda.

Shocked by the results, the Baganda separatists, who formed a political party called Kabaka Yekka, had second thoughts about the wisdom of their election boycott. They quickly welcomed the recommendations of a British commission that proposed a future federal form of government. According to these recommendations, Buganda would enjoy a measure of internal autonomy if it participated fully in the national government.

For its part, the UPC was equally anxious to eject its DP rivals from government before they became entrenched. Obote reached an understanding with Kabaka Freddie and the KY, accepting Buganda's special federal relationship and even a provision by which the kabaka could appoint Buganda's representatives to the National Assembly, in return for a strategic alliance to defeat the DP. The Kabaka was also promised the largely ceremonial position of Head of state of Uganda, which was of great symbolic importance to the Baganda.

This marriage of convenience between the UPC and the KY made inevitable the defeat of the DP interim administration. In the aftermath of the April 1962 final election leading up to independence, Uganda's national assembly consisted of forty-three UPC members, twenty-four KY members, and twenty-four DP members. The new UPC-KY coalition led Uganda into independence in October 1962, with Obote as Prime Minister of Uganda, and the Kabaka becoming President of Uganda a year later.
