= Ignatius K. Musaazi =

Ugandan politician

Ignatius Kangave Musaazi (1905–1990) formed the first political party in Uganda. namely the Uganda National Congress (UNC) party on 2 March 1952. Musaazi became its first president, and Abubaker Kakyama Mayanja was the party's first secretary general. Other key figures of the UNC included Apollo K. Kironde who was the legal advisor to the party. Towards the end of 1951, Musaazi rented part of the ground floor of a house on what is now known as Musajjalumbwa Road near the Lubiri (palace) in Mengo. The house belonged to the late Yakobo Musajjalumbwa, a former treasurer (Omuwanika) of the Buganda kingdom. This house became a centre of political activity and in 1952 witnessed the birth of the Uganda National Congress.

== National hero ==
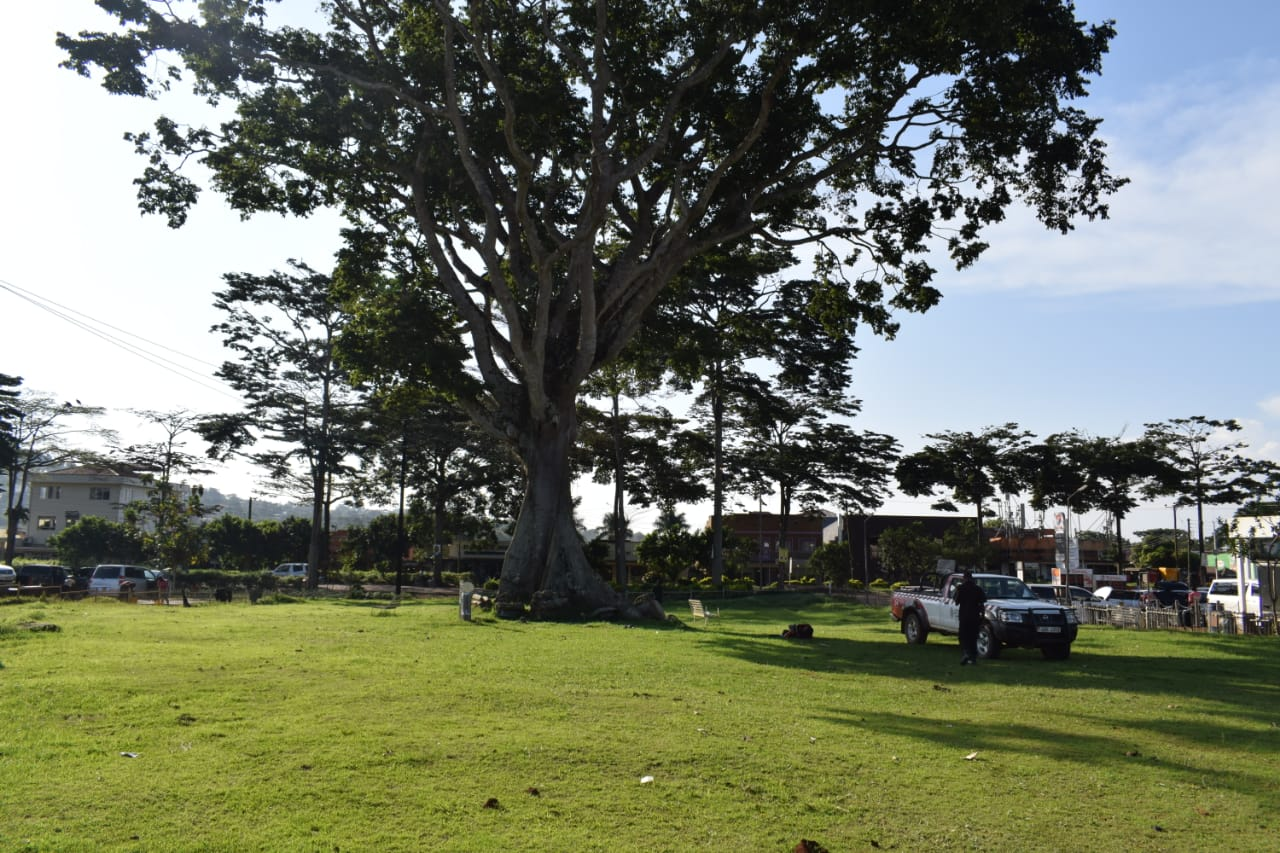
The "freedom tree" where the culture of political talk started in Uganda. Politicians of the time like Ignitious Kangave Nusazi held pro-independence rallies under this tree.

I. K. Musaazi is a national hero (1990), and agreeably the father of the nation, of the republic of Uganda in East Africa, and is buried at Kololo heroes ground, in Kampala, the capital city of Uganda. He participated in the Buganda riots of 1945 and 1949 which resulted in the burning down of houses belonging to pro-government (British Colonial Government) Baganda chiefs. Buganda is part of Uganda, and the people of Buganda are called Baganda; they speak Luganda.

== Buganda riots – 1945 and 1949 ==
Briefly, the background to the Buganda riots mentioned above, is that the rioters demanded the following: (1) the right to bypass the price controls on the export sales of cotton imposed by the British colonial government, (2) Removal of the local Asian monopoly over cotton ginning – the Asians in Uganda were deemed to have an unfair advantage by having exclusive rights over cotton ginning, (3) The right to have their own representatives in local government and thus replace the chiefs appointed by the British Colonial Government. Ignatius Musaazi was viewed by the British Colonial administration as being behind the riots. The British governor at the time, Sir John Hathorn Hall (Governor and Commander-in-Chief of Uganda 1945–1952), regarded the riots as the work of Communists. He refused to give way to the rioters' demands.

== Uganda African Farmers Union banned ==
Musaazi had formed the Uganda African Farmers Union (UAFU) in 1947 and the UAFU was blamed for the 1949 riots. The Union was banned as a result. Many supporters went into hiding. Musaazi himself was no stranger to prison as the colonial establishment tried to stop his efforts to bring about change in favour of the African farmers and Ugandans in general. I. K. Musaazi formed the Federation of Partnerships of Uganda African Farmers (FPUAF) union following the banning of the Uganda African Farmers Union. He gave up his job as a teacher at the department of education, at what was then Makerere University College (later became Makerere University), in order to help African farmers oppose the prevailing unfairness in trade, especially for cotton.

== Help from LSE and Fenner Brockway ==
I. K. Musaazi went to London in 1950 and lobbied the British Parliament for support of the FPUAF and its aspirations. Among many in the British Parliament who supported him was Fenner Brockway, a British Labour Party Member of Parliament(MP). He also received support from many intellectuals, particularly from the London School of Economics (LSE), who were sympathetic and supportive. While in London, Musaazi had the opportunity to speak to LSE students and among them was an American, George Shepherd who was completing a PhD in political science. George Shepherd accepted Musaazi's invitation to provide technical help for the FPUAF. The main aim was to fight the agricultural policies in Uganda which greatly disadvantaged Africans in favour of Asians and Europeans.

George W. Shepherd arrived in Uganda in 1951 when he was only 25 years old. His presence in Uganda was unwelcome by the British colonial government. Although Musaazi was already perceived as a troublemaker by the colonial government, George Shepherd and his FPUAF colleagues managed to succeed on several fronts: (a) they reorganised the accounting books of the FPUAF, (b) the FPUAF by-laws were redrafted, (c) transport issues affecting the FPUAF were sorted out. Significantly Shepherd and his FPUAF colleagues drew up a strategy to address the unfair agricultural policies.

Shepherd's approach to racial reconciliation is perhaps one of the most significant contributions he made for Musaazi and his Federation of Partnerships of Uganda African Farmers (FPUAF) union, and indeed for Uganda as a whole. Shepherd was in Uganda for only two years but with the help of his FPUAF colleagues left a significant mark on the political landscape of the country.

== Progressive climate ==
The arrival of Sir Andrew Cohen (Governor of Uganda, 1952–1957) in January 1952, provided for a more progressive climate in colonial Uganda. Sir Cohen constituted a commission to look into the farmer's demands and conceded to most of them. Prior to the arrival of Sir Cohen, there was much needed change in Uganda. Up to that point matters tended to progress very slowly, for example it was not until 23 October 1945 that the then new governor, Sir John Hall, approved the nomination of 3 Africans as members of LEGCO – the Legislative Council, in effect the Parliament of that colonial period. Up to then LEGCO was dominated by Europeans. The three African representatives who joined LEGCO were sworn in on 4 December 1945. They were: Michael Ernest Kawalya Kaggwa (Katikiro, i.e. Prime Minister in the government of Buganda Kingdom), Petero Nyangabyaki (Katikiro of Bunyoro), and Yekonia Zirabamuzale (Secretary General of Busoga) LEGCO was set up by the Colonial authorities in March 1921 and at the very start it was a small group composed of Europeans: the colonial governor, four officials, and 2 nominated non-officials.

== 1952 – UNC formed, later split ==
With the success of having most of the farmers' demands accepted by Sir Andrew Cohen, Ignatius Kangave Musaazi and Abubaker Kakyama Mayanja formed the Uganda National Congress party (UNC) on Sunday 2 March 1952. The party was a force for political change in colonial Uganda.

The UNC party split up later into factions but the groundwork for Uganda's independence was laid by the UNC and its founder, Ignatius Kangave Musaazi, who died in 1990 at the age of 85 at Namirembe hospital. President Yoweri Kaguta Museveni, the current president of the republic of Uganda is patron of the I. K. Musaazi Memorial Foundation. President Museveni was present and delivered a speech about Musaazi, when Professor George W. Shepherd delivered the first annual I. K. Musaazi memorial lecture at the Kampala Sheraton Hotel on Friday 28 September 2007.

== Early life and career ==
Musaazi was born in a village called Timuna, near Wobulenzi, Uganda. He attended King's College Budo and then gained a scholarship to study divinity in the UK. On completion of his studies in the UK he was told that he could only graduate in his own country Uganda.

Musaazi met Mary Ritah Nansikombi while he was at King's College Budo and she was at Gayaza High School. In 1936 they were married in Kenya. They had 11 children. Mary is the granddaughter of Sir Apolo Kaggwa who was a Katikkiro (Prime Minister) in the kingdom of Buganda Government, and is the daughter of Mary and Sepiriya Kaddumukasa. She recalls the difficulties which she and her family faced because of her husband's resolve to fight for Uganda's independence: "My husband was imprisoned 37 times.... he was charged with treason for organising Ugandans to rebel against the colonialists".
