= Uganda (1962–1963) =

African country from 1962 to 1963

- 1962–1963
- Flag Coat of arms
- Motto: "For God and My Country"
- Anthem: "Oh Uganda, Land of Beauty"
- Capital: Kampala
- Government: Federal parliamentary constitutional monarchy
- Queen
  - 1962–1963: Elizabeth II
- Governor-General
  - 1962–1963: Walter Coutts
- Prime Minister
  - 1962–1963: Milton Obote
- Legislature: National Assembly
- Historical era: Decolonisation of Africa, Cold War
  - Independence: 9 October 1962
  - State of Uganda: 9 October 1963
- Currency: East African shilling
Preceded by	Succeeded by
Uganda Protectorate	State of Uganda

Uganda became an independent sovereign state on 9 October 1962. As a Commonwealth realm, the British monarch, Elizabeth II, remained head of state as Queen of Uganda until the link with the British monarchy was severed on 9 October 1963 and the Kabaka (King) of Buganda, Sir Edward Mutesa II, became the first President of Uganda.

== History ==
Direct British rule of the Uganda Protectorate ended in 1962 with the Uganda Independence Act, which granted independence of the protectorate under the name "Uganda" but retained the British monarch, Elizabeth II, as nominal head of state and Queen of Uganda. Her constitutional roles as head of state were mostly delegated to the Governor-General of Uganda Sir Walter Coutts, who was the only holder of the office.

Milton Obote held office as prime minister and head of government.

In 1963, Uganda adopted a new constitution which abolished the links with the British monarchy. Uganda remained in the Commonwealth of Nations, but became a federal elective monarchy under the name State of Uganda in which the office of the President of Uganda was elected by parliament from among the 5 subnational monarchs. The description "State" implied that the country was not a republic but instead a federation of tribal kingdoms. Following the proclamation of the State of Uganda on 9 October 1963, the Kabaka (King) of Buganda, Edward Mutesa II, became the first President of Uganda. Uganda did not become a republic de jure until 1966 with Obote's conflict with President Edward Mutesa II.
