= Queen of Uganda =

Elizabeth II's reign in Uganda from 1962 to 1963

- Coat of arms of Uganda

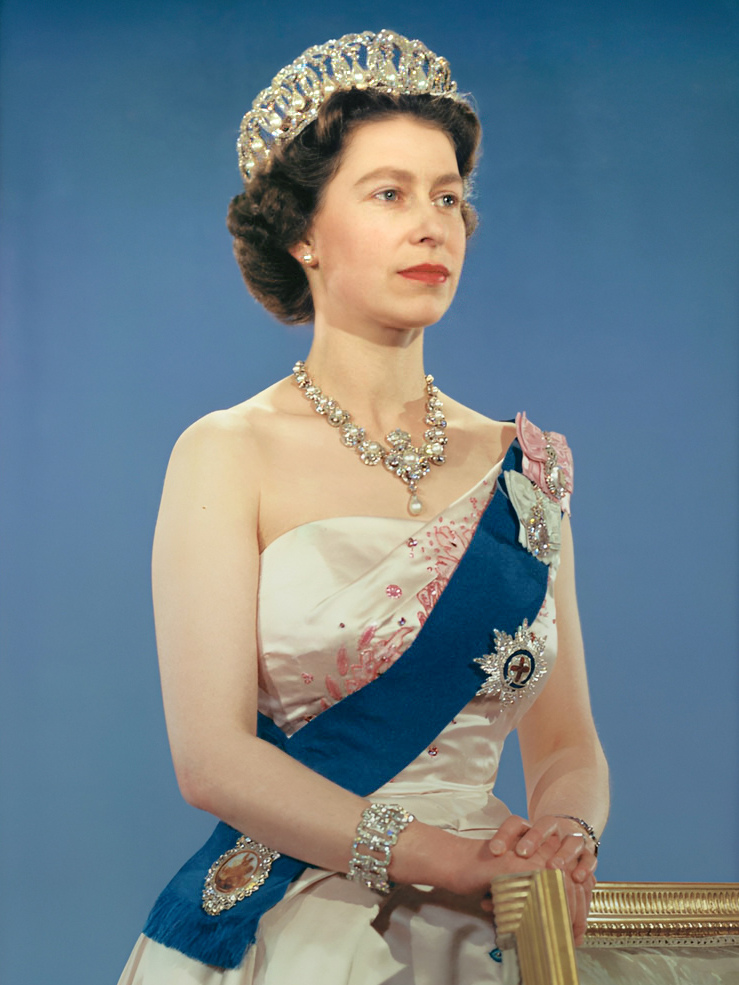
- Elizabeth II

Details
- Style: Her Majesty
- Formed: 9 October 1962
- Abolished: 9 October 1963

Elizabeth II was Queen of Uganda as well as the head of state of Uganda from 1962 to 1963, when the country was an independent constitutional monarchy. She was also the sovereign of other countries in the Commonwealth of Nations, including the United Kingdom.

The Uganda Independence Act, passed by the Parliament of the United Kingdom in 1962, transformed the British Uganda Protectorate into a sovereign state on 9 October 1962. The monarch was ceremonial head of state with her constitutional roles delegated to the governor-general of Uganda.

== Constitutional role ==
On 9 October 1962, Uganda became a constitutional monarchy with Elizabeth II as the queen of Uganda. She was represented by a governor-general, who carried out duties on her behalf in Uganda. The supreme central legislature became the Parliament of Uganda, consisting of the monarch and the National Assembly. During the independence celebrations, Queen Elizabeth was represented by the Duke and Duchess of Kent. The Duke opened Uganda's first parliament and gave the Speech from the Throne on the monarch's behalf. In his speech at the formal opening of the National Assembly, the governor-general said that the Government of Uganda recognised Elizabeth as the head of the Commonwealth and as queen of independent Uganda.

== Abolition ==
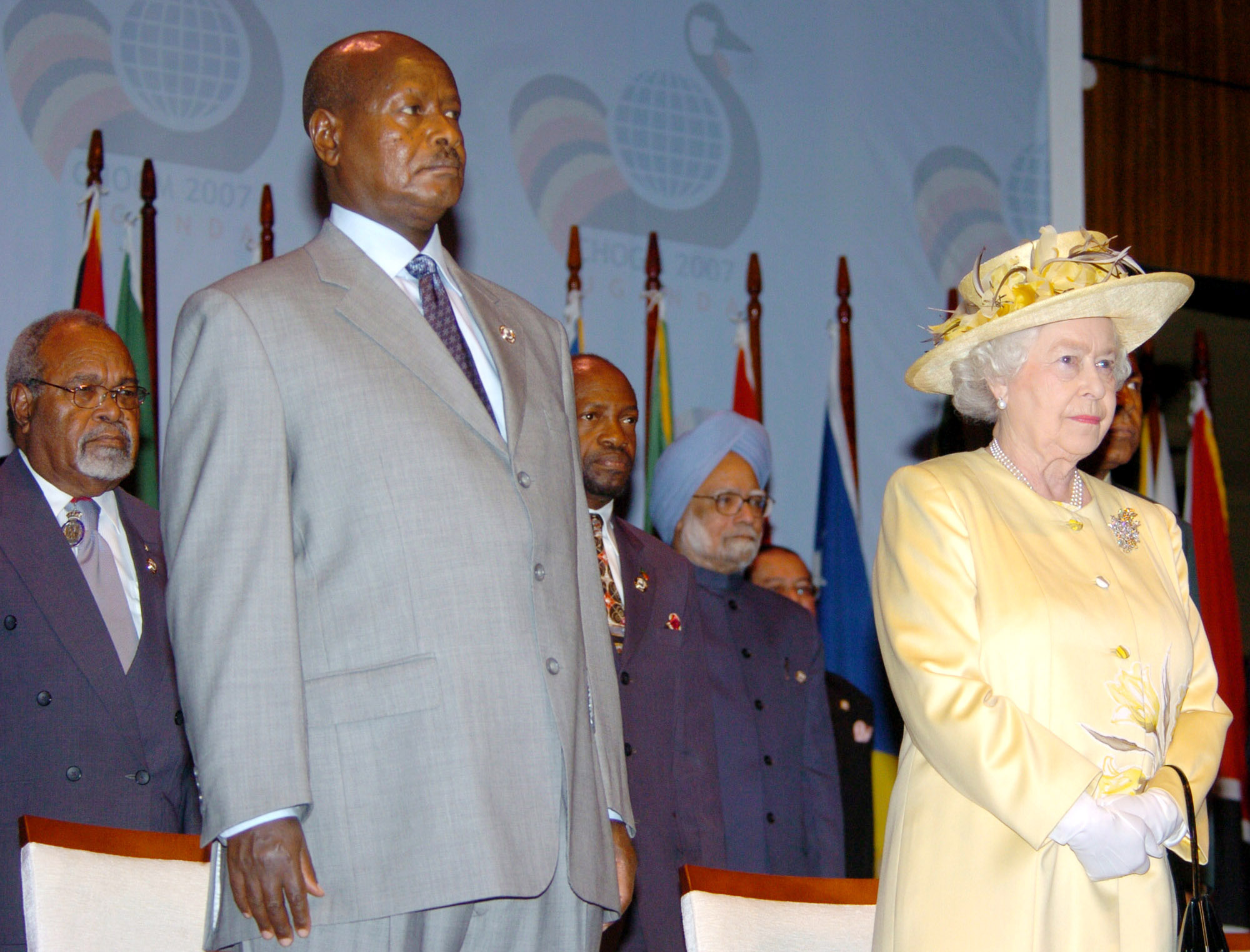
Queen Elizabeth II in Uganda with President Yoweri Museveni, 2007

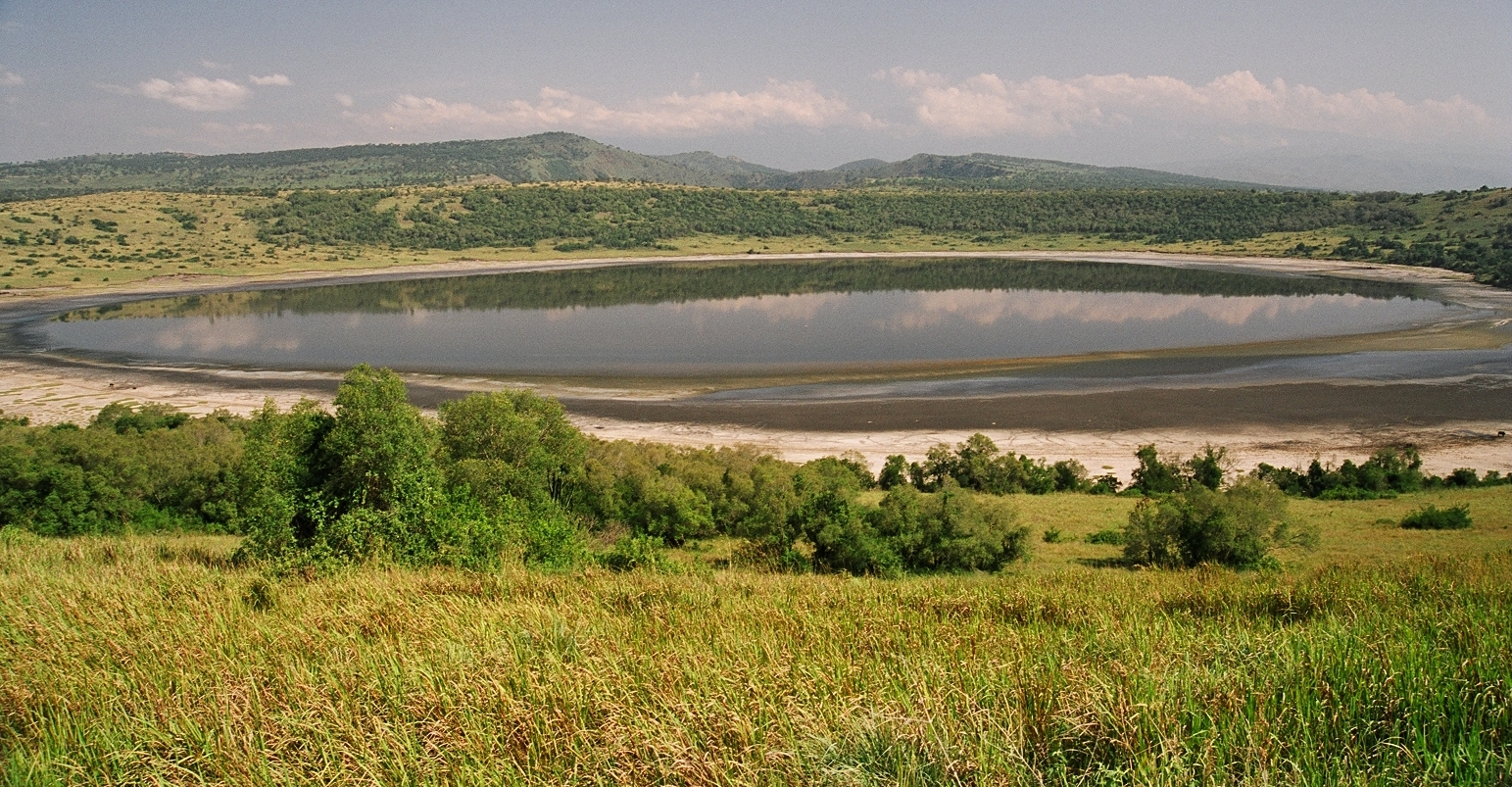
Queen Elizabeth National Park, Uganda

The Parliament of Uganda amended the constitution in 1963, and on 9 October that year Uganda became an elective monarchy within the Commonwealth, with a president elected from among the kings of the constituent sub-national kingdoms and the constitutional heads of districts as its head of state.

Queen Elizabeth visited Uganda on 28–30 April 1954 and 21–24 November 2007, the latter time to attend the Commonwealth Heads of Government Meeting 2007. The Kazinga National Park, in the west of Uganda, was renamed Queen Elizabeth National Park in 1954 to commemorate her visit.

== Styles ==
Elizabeth had the following styles in her role as the monarch of Uganda:

- 9 October 1962 – 2 November 1962: Elizabeth the Second, by the Grace of God, of the United Kingdom of Great Britain and Northern Ireland and of Her other Realms and Territories Queen, Head of the Commonwealth, Defender of the Faith
- 2 November 1962 – 9 October 1963: Elizabeth the Second, by the Grace of God, Queen of Uganda and of Her other Realms and Territories, Head of the Commonwealth
