= Walter Coutts =

British colonial administrator

Sir Walter Coutts GCMG MBE
- Coutts in 1962

Governor-General of Uganda
- In office 9 October 1962 – 9 October 1963
- Monarch: Elizabeth II
- Prime Minister: Milton Obote
- Preceded by: himself as Governor of Uganda
- Succeeded by: position abolished

Governor of Uganda
- In office 1961–1962
- Monarch: Elizabeth II
- Preceded by: Sir Frederick Crawford
- Succeeded by: himself as Governor-General of Uganda

Administrator of Saint Vincent and the Grenadines
- In office 1948–1955
- Monarch: Elizabeth II
- Governor: Sir Robert Arundell; Sir Edward Beetham
- Preceded by: Ronald Herbert Garvey
- Succeeded by: Alexander Falconer Giles

Personal details
- Born: 30 November 1912
- Died: 4 November 1988 (aged 75)
- Education: St John's College, Cambridge
- Profession: colonial administrator

Walter Fleming Coutts GCMG MBE (30 November 1912 – 4 November 1988) was a British colonial administrator and was Uganda's final Governor before independence, from 1961–1962. He was Governor-General of Uganda 1962–1963. He was chosen for this job because he had a reputation within the colonial office for supporting African nationalism and African independence movements.

== Personal life and education ==
Coutts was born on 30 November 1912 in Aberdeen, Scotland; and died on 4 November 1988 in Perth, Western Australia at 75 years. His brothers were Brigadier Frank Coutts and Ben Coutts.

He was educated at Glasgow Academy, the University of St Andrews and St John's College, Cambridge.

He married Janet Elizabeth Bones Jamieson; they had two children.

He was also a Knighted as a knight Grand Cross of the order of St. Michael and St. George. A member of the order of the British Empire.

== Career ==
Coutts began his service in Kenya as a District Officer, DO in 1936 and later was promoted to District Commissioner, DC in 1947.

In 1948-1955, He served as the administrator of Saint Vincent and the grenadines preceding Ronald Herbert Garvey and he was later succeeded by Alexander Falconer Giles.

Still in 1955 He served as the Special Commissioner for African Elections, between 1956 and 1958, he was the Minister for Education, Labor and Lands in Kenya and later served as the Chief Secretary from 1958-1961.

From 1961-1962, he was appointed as the final British governor of Uganda preceding Sir Frederick Crawford, he oversaw the transition to internal self-governance of Uganda and appointed Benedicto Kiwanuka as the first prime minister in March 1962.

1962-1963 following the independence of Uganda on 9 October 1962, he became the first and last Governor-General, representing the British monarch, under Queen Elizabeth II until the office was abolished in 1963 when Uganda became a republic.

== Retirement and death ==
Sir Walter F. Coutts eventually retired to Perth, Western Australia where he died from in 1988.

== Government office summary ==
Government offices
Preceded by Ronald Herbert Garvey	Administrator of Saint Vincent and the Grenadines; 1948 – 1955	Succeeded by Alexander Falconer Giles
Preceded by Sir Frederick Crawford	Governor of Uganda; 1961–1962	Post abolished
Preceded by Position created	Governor-General of Uganda; 1962–1963	Succeeded by Position abolished

== See also ==
- Clan Farquharson - the surname Coutts is a sept of this Scottish clan
- Alexander Beattie
- George Beckwith (British Army officer)
- Henry William Bentinck
- William Bentinck (Royal Navy officer)
- George Berkeley (colonial administrator)
- Charles Brisbane
