= Bugaia Island =

Island in Lake Victoria, Uganda

- Interactive map of Bugaia Island

Geography
- Location: Lake Victoria
- Coordinates: 0°02′N 33°15′E
- Archipelago: Buvuma Island

Administration
- Uganda
- District: Buvuma District

Additional information
- Time zone: EAT (UTC+3)

Bugaia Island is an island in the Buvuma Island group in northern Lake Victoria (Uganda), located south-east of Jinja and immediately north of the Equator. Bugaia lies south-west of Buvuma Island.

== Geography ==
The islands of Buvuma and Bugaia form part of an archipelago near the northern shore of Lake Victoria, in the area south-east of Jinja and between Entebbe and the Kavirondo Gulf. Published archaeological and limnological studies place Bugaia in the coordinate range immediately north of the Equator, around 33°15′E longitude.

== Administration ==
Bugaia Island is part of Uganda's Central Region, within Buvuma District (Buvuma Islands County Constituency).

== Research and monitoring ==
=== Archaeology ===
Bugaia has been included in archaeological survey and documentation work on the Buvuma Islands group. A Belgian expedition (February to April 1968) reported multiple sites on Buvuma and Bugaia, with excavations carried out on each island. Later archival work has continued to compile maps and records related to the same surveys and excavations on Buvuma and Bugaia.

=== Limnology ===
Bugaia is used as a named reference station in Lake Victoria limnological literature and reports. In the LVEMP synthesis for Uganda, temperature profiles at “Bugaia Island (UP2)” are used to describe seasonal thermal stratification and mixing, including a three-phase annual pattern described from 1960 to 1961 observations and later comparisons using 1994–95 profiles.

== Economy ==
Published fisheries work on the northern Lake Victoria region identifies fishing grounds around Bugaia Island as among the deeper areas exploited for dagaa (Rastrineobola argentea) in Ugandan waters, alongside other grounds near Buvuma and Kasaali.

== See also ==
- Buvuma Island
- Lake Victoria
