= Abu Mayanja =

Ugandan politician (1929–2005)

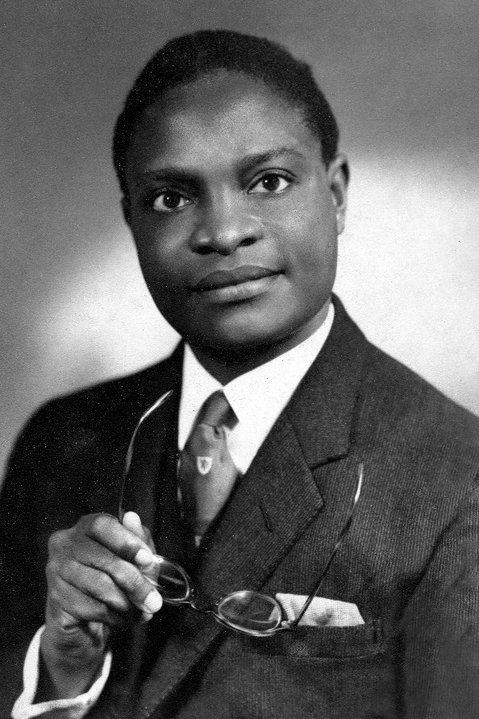
Abu Mayanja, MP, Barrister, Attorney General in the Government of Uganda, politician, and Government Minister

Abubaker Kakyama Mayanja (August 1929 – 4 November 2005) was the first Secretary General of the Uganda National Congress party, the first political party in Uganda set up on 6 March 1952 by Ignatius K. Musaazi. He became the Secretary General of the UNC in his youth when he was still an undergraduate student at Makerere University College, which later became Makerere University. Abu Mayanja helped Musaazi draft the Constitution of the Uganda National Congress party. Abu was a fighter for independence in Uganda and Africa, a strong parliamentarian and one who disliked injustice. He contributed greatly to the political life of Uganda as a constitutional expert, formidable parliamentarian, government minister at various times, and as an excellent Barrister in private practice. His written contributions in the Tribune magazine, Transition, Uganda Argus and New Vision newspapers were well received and much respected.

== Early life and career ==
Abu Mayanja was born in 1929 to Abdalla Waswa Kambuga Kakyama and Mariantonia Kayaga. His father Abdalla was from Buga village (Ziba, near Ngogwe in Mukono district of Uganda). His mother Mariantonia was from Buvuma Islands. His father worked as a subsistence farmer and was a Muslim by faith. His mother was a Christian.

Abu Mayanja distinguished himself academically despite the disadvantages of coming from a relatively poor family. His mother Mariantonia taught him to read and write by encouraging him to read old newspapers which had previously served as wrappings for kabalagala, a local pancake made from cassava flour and bananas. At school, he skipped Senior Three, going to Senior Four [the candidate class of Ordinary Level in Uganda], seeing as his intelligence and ever-growing relationship with literature had put him way ahead of his age-mates. He was a very able young man and sat for his Senior Six [the candidate class of Advanced Level in Uganda] examinations at Old Kampala Senior Secondary School in 1949. Prior to this, he had scored the highest marks in the Primary Leaving Examinations; this was the highest ever recorded marks in the whole country at the time.

Abu Mayanja attended King's College Budo in 1944 while D.G. R. Herbert was the Headmaster, and was admitted to England House. Apollo Kironde was one of his teachers at King's College Budo. Abu went to Makerere University College in 1950 to read English Literature, History and Mathematics. While at Makerere he was the editor of The Makerere Current News and also the Secretary of the Guild Council.

== Makerere to University of Cambridge ==
Abu Mayanja was expelled from Makerere University College in 1952 because he and other students complained about the diet and started a strike. While still concentrating on UNC activities, Abu Mayanja was keen to resume his academic studies.

To revive his academic pursuits, Abu sought support from lecturers at Makerere University College; they included Professor A. G. Warner, Dr Kenneth Ingham and Bernard Debansin. They were all in agreement that it would be a great shame for Uganda if Abu Mayanja, a bright young man, did not continue with his university education. They recommended continuation of his studies.

With this strong recommendation, the matter was taken by Abu Mayanja to Latima Mpagi, then an official at Mengo. The Kabaka (King), Sir Edward Mutesa II, raised the issue of Abu Mayanja's education with the Colonial Governor Sir Andrew Cohen. As it happened, Sir Andrew Cohen was about to leave for London on leave and while in London he made arrangements for Abu Mayanja to attend the University of Cambridge. Sir Edward Mutesa II and Sir Andrew Cohen were thus instrumental in Abu Mayanja's continuation of his undergraduate education. A very bright and able Abu Mayanja was deservedly given the opportunity to resume his education at a university of international standing.

== Independence fighter ==
Having been accepted to study at the University of Cambridge, Abu had to make a speedy escape to London because of his political position. He was under threat of arrest by the colonial authorities. He was in the United Kingdom from 1953 until 1959. While still a student at Cambridge University (King's), where he read History, Abu Mayanja attended the first All-African Peoples' Conference held in Accra, Ghana between 5–13 December 1958. The conference was organised by Kwame Nkrumah and chaired by Tom Mboya. The conference was the forerunner of the Organisation of African Unity (OAU) which later became the African Union (AU).

Abu Mayanja met many Africans in London who were involved in campaigns for political independence in their respective countries. He wrote numerous articles which were published in Tribune magazine. He advocated political independence for Uganda and Africa from colonial rule. Abu Mayanja was the first Muslim in Uganda to earn a university degree.

== UNC splits into factions ==
The Uganda National Congress Party split into factions during the time Abu Mayanja was away in the United Kingdom. On his return on 30 May 1959, after completing his undergraduate studies at Cambridge University, and legal studies at the Bar (The Honourable Society of Lincoln's Inn – October 1955 to June 1957); and having worked for a while at the chambers of Roland Brown, Abu Mayanja found the UNC political party no longer in existence. He went to the United States of America on a Leadership grant and returned to Uganda in February 1960.

== Buganda government minister ==
In 1961 Abu Mayanja was appointed a Minister of Education in the Buganda government. He participated in the Lancaster House Conference in London prior to Uganda's independence from Britain which was granted on 9 October 1962. Abu Mayanja resigned in April 1964 after the Speaker, Mr Eriasafi Kalule insulted him during a session of the Lukiiko (Parliament of Buganda). He was, however, later that year elected by the Lukiiko as MP in September 1964 following the resignation of Jimmy Simpson as representative of Kyaggwe North East.

== 1962 Constitution ==
Abu Mayanja was among the delegation to the Uganda Independence Conference in 1962. He was given the responsibility of overseeing the implementation of the 1962 Constitution in Buganda, in effect he was responsible for the attachment of the Buganda constitution within the main Uganda constitution.

== Charges of sedition ==
In October 1968, following a critique of the 1967 Uganda Constitution in the Transition Magazine (April 1968 issue); which upset the then Government, Abu Mayanja was arrested and charged for sedition. At the time he was newly married to his first wife, Hadija. Abu was acquitted of the charges but immediately rearrested in Court under the emergency detention powers operating at the time. Amnesty International adopted him as a prisoner of conscience. He spent two years in Luzira maximum security prison, away from his wife Hadija, until 1970 when he was released.

== "Supersonic speed government" ==
Abu Mayanja was appointed Minister of Education in 1971 by Idi Amin, but on 30 November 1972 he, as well as other government ministers, was relieved of his ministerial duties, he was by then Minister of Labour. The other government ministers who were sacked were: Professor William B. Banage, Apollo Kironde, and Yekosefati Engur. Explaining the reason for their sacking, Idi Amin told the ministers that they could not cope under his government which was now running at “supersonic speed”.

He was called upon to perform other duties of importance. In 1972 Abu Mayanja chaired the committee that made the arrangements for the return of the body of Ssekabaka Sir Edward Mutesa II from London, where he had died in 1969, back to Uganda. In 1986 Abu Mayanja became Attorney General and Deputy Prime Minister under President Yoweri Kaguta Museveni.

== Lungujja ==
For most of his life, Abu Mayanja lived at Lungujja, near Mengo, apart from episodes abroad as a student in the UK and in exile in Kenya, and also when he was imprisoned during the 1960s for writing an article about the 1967 Uganda Constitution. He suffered during the colonial period and was arrested a few times; in fact on one memorable occasion it was Mwalimu Julius Nyerere, the late President of Tanzania, who paid the necessary fine to secure his release.

== Abu Mayanja Foundation ==
The Abu Mayanja Foundation inaugural memorial lecture was delivered by the renowned African academic and political writer Professor Ali Mazrui on 30 July 2007 at the Rwenzori Ball Room, Sheraton Kampala Hotel. Professor Mazrui has in the past lived and worked in Uganda. He was at Makerere University from 1965 to 1973 as Head of the Department of Political Science (1965–1973), and Dean of the Faculty of Social Sciences (1967–1969). The inaugural lecture by Professor Ali Mazrui was entitled "Between Secular Activism and Religious Observance – Abu Mayanja and Africa's Triple Heritage".
