= Monarchy of Uganda =

Monarchy of Uganda may refer to:

- List of current non-sovereign Ugandan monarchs
  - Kabaka of Buganda, the title of the king of Uganda's traditional Buganda kingdom
- Queen of Uganda, the title of the head of state of Uganda as a Commonwealth realm
