= Bubembe Island =

Island in Uganda

- Location within Uganda

Geography
- Location: Lake Victoria
- Archipelago: Ssese Islands 0°25′S 32°18′E

Administration
- Uganda

Bubembe Island is an island located in Lake Victoria, Uganda. It forms part of the Ssese Islands, archipelago and lies within Kalangala District, in the north-western portion of the lake.

== Geography and location ==
Bubembe Island is situated in Lake Victoria and is accessible by water transport.It is approximately a nine-hour streamer journey from Port Bell, or about 45 minutes by local ferry from Bukakata. From Bugaia Island, the largest island in the Ssese group, Bubembe can be reached by boat in approximately two hours. The surrounding area includes numerous smaller islands, many of which are sparsely populated or uninhabited.

== Environment and biodiversity ==
The island features diverse natural environments, including forests, swamps and lake shore habitats, many of which remain relatively undisturbed. These habitats support a variety of wildlife species.

Birdlife around Bubembe Island includes species such as the shoebill stork, herons, geese, parrots, kingfishers, fish eagles, weaver birds, flycatchers, hornbills, turacos and paradise flycatchers. The isand's forest and wetlands also sustain other wildlife, including waterbuck, hippopotamus, crocodiles, colobus monkeys and vervet monkeys.

Butterflies and other insect species are also noted in the area.

== Human settlement and economy ==
Bubembe Isand has small, scattered human settlements. Local residents are primarily engaged in fishing and small scale trade. Due to its remote location and sparse population, infrastructure and services on the island are limited.

== Cultural significance ==
Bubembe Island is associated with traditional Baganda religious beliefs. Local traditions describe the island as the site of a temple dedicated to the deity Mukasa, regarded in some accounts as a spirit of god connected to Lake Victoria.

According to these traditions, Mukasa was once found on the island during his youth and survived without ordinary food. Early inhabitants of the region purportedly first regarded him as a spiritual being due to his unusual habits. Ritual practices developed around offerings believed to be acceptable such as specific parts of slaughtered animals.

The temple attributed to Mukasa was traditionally a conical structure made of reed. It was reportedly maintained and rebuilt at intervals under the direction of local authority figures. Religious intermediaries, sometimes referred to as mediums, were believed to communicate the deity's will to others. These individuals were traditionally subject to specific social restrictions, such as limitations on marriage and public engagement and typically held their position for life.

== Environmental destruction ==
The vegetable oil producer Bidco started to bulldoze parts of the island to set up monocultures of oil palm, used for cosmetics and biofuels. After violent protests, the Ugandan government has stopped further destruction for the moment, but the unique biosphere is currently under serious threat.

== Administration ==
Bubembe Island is administratively part of Kalangala District, which oversees the Ssese Islands in Uganda.

== See also ==
- Kalangala Islands
- Lake Victoria
- Port Bell
- Mukasa (deity)
- Ssese Islands
