= Harry Cordeaux =

British colonial administrator (1870–1943)

Major Sir Harry Cordeaux KCMG CB
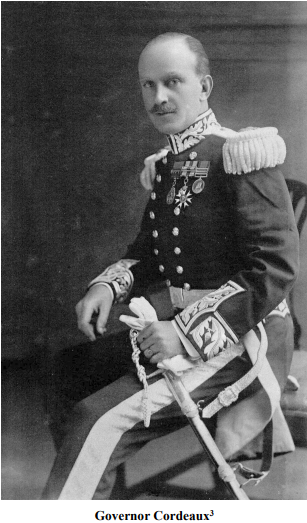

Commissioner of British Somaliland
- In office 8 May 1906 – 1909
- Preceded by: Eric John Eagles Swayne
- Succeeded by: William Henry Manning

Commissioner of Uganda
- In office 1 Feb 1910 – 18 Oct 1910
- Preceded by: Henry Hesketh Joudou Bell

Governor of Uganda
- In office 18 Oct 1910 – 1911
- Succeeded by: Frederick John Jackson

Governor of Saint Helena
- In office 1912–1920
- Preceded by: Henry Galway
- Succeeded by: Robert Francis Peel

Governor of the Bahamas
- In office 8 December 1920 – 1926
- Monarch: George V
- Preceded by: William Lamond Allardyce
- Succeeded by: Charles William James Orr

Personal details
- Born: Harry Edward Spiller Cordeaux; 15 November 1870 Poona, British India
- Died: 2 July 1943 (aged 72)
- Citizenship: British
- Spouse: Maud Wentworth-Fitzwilliam (m. 1912)
- Education: St John's College, Cambridge

Major Sir Harry Edward Spiller Cordeaux KCMG CB (15 November 1870 – 2 July 1943) was an Indian Army officer and colonial administrator who became in turn governor of Uganda, Saint Helena and the Bahamas.

== Early life and education ==
Cordeaux was born on 15 November 1870 in Poona, British India. His father, Edward Cordeaux, was a judge in Bombay. He was educated at Brighton College and Cheltenham College. In 1888, he won a scholarship to St John's College, Cambridge, graduating with a Bachelor of Arts degree in 1892.

== Career ==
Cordeaux joined the Indian Staff Corps in 1895. He was promoted to Lieutenant in 1896, Captain in 1903 and Major in 1912. He entered the Bombay Political Department in 1898, and that year was appointed Assistant Resident at Berbera, British Somaliland. Cordeaux was appointed Vice-Consul at Berbera on 15 October 1900, and promoted to Consul on 15 November 1902, serving until 1906, during which time he also exercised the office of Deputy Commissioner of British Somaliland between 1904 and 1906. He was appointed Commissioner and Commander-in-Chief of British Somaliland from 1906 to 1910. During this time, he took a keen interest in the fauna of Somaliland, identifying the small antelope Cordeaux's Dik-dik Madoqua (saltiana) cordeauxi, now usually seen as a subspecies of Salt's Dik-dik.

=== As colonial governor ===
Cordeaux served as the first Governor of Uganda from 1910 to 1911, supervising the construction of the railway from Jinja to Kakindu. He was then appointed Governor of St Helena, serving from 1911 to 1920, and later Governor and Commander-in-Chief of the British Bahamas (1920–1926). In 1920 he laid the foundation stone of the Supreme Court of the Bahamas.

In 1923, concessions were granted to Cordeaux and Arthur Sands to cut the pine forest on New Providence. They built a sawmill south of Gambier Village near Jack Pond, but the licence was never profitable and was relinquished in 1930.

During the period of Prohibition in the United States (1920–1933), there was a huge increase in exports of whiskey from Britain to the Bahamas. By February 1921, Cordeaux reported that there were 31 bonded warehouses in the island. Revenue rose from £81,049 in 1919 to £1,065,899 in 1923, and remained above £500,000 per year until 1930.

Speaking in Montreal, Cordeaux said that the liquor traffic was the reason for the island's healthy economy, including the ability to finance a £250,000 improvement to the harbor in Nassau. This statement was widely circulated in the American press. The British took no measures to stop the trade.

== Honours ==
He was appointed a Companion of the Order of St Michael and St George (CMG) in the 1902 Coronation Honours list on 26 June 1902, a Companion of the Order of the Bath (CB) in 1904 and created a Knight Commander of the Order of St Michael and St George (KCMG) in 1921, styled Sir thereafter.

== Personal life and death ==
Cordeaux married Maud Wentworth-Fitzwilliam on 2 October 1912. He died on 2 July 1943.
