= Uganda National Congress =

Political party in Uganda

Uganda National Congress (UNC) was the first political party in Uganda. It was a socialist party.

== UNC formed ==
Formed on Sunday 2 March 1952, Ignatius Kangave Musaazi was its first president, and Abubaker Kakyama Mayanja the party's first secretary general. Apollo K. Kironde was the legal advisor to the party. The six men who founded the party were: Ignatius Kangave Musaazi (Buganda), Abubakar Kakyama Mayanja (Buganda), Stefano Abwangoto (Bugisu), Ben Okwerede (Teso), Yekosofati Engur (Lango) and S.B. Katembo (Toro).

== UNC conceived at Musajjalumbwa's house ==
The UNC was conceived at Musajjalumbwa's house located on what is now Musajjalumbwa Road, near the Lubiri (Kabaka's palace), at Mengo. In 1951, Ignatius Musaazi rented part of the ground floor of Musajjalumbwa's house, a house of the late Yakobo Musajjalumbwa, who was a Treasurer (Omuwanika) in the Buganda Kingdom. At this house, a lot of work was done which resulted in the creation of the UNC. The party did much to help achieve Uganda's independence from Great Britain on Tuesday 9 October 1962.

== UNC involvement in the struggle for independence in Africa ==
The UNC was involved in the struggle for independence in Africa. In Cairo (Egypt) John Kale represented the UNC and coordinated the struggle for the independence of African countries. Abu Mayanja and John Kale established a UNC office in Cairo to link up with contacts all over the world in order to assist freedom fighters in Africa.

The Secretary General of the UNC, Abu Mayanja, used his close relationship with the then Chinese leader Mao Tse-tung and Prime Minister Zhou Enlai to secure support for African freedom fighters involved in the struggle for independence in Africa. The UNC received £500,000 from China, as well as a modern printing press for the UNC from Italy. The printing press was installed in offices of two Ugandan newspapers at the time, namely The Uganda Post and The Uganda Express, which were based at Kololo in Kampala.
