= Frederick Crawford (colonial administrator) =

Sir Frederick Crawford GCMG OBE (9 March 1906 – 27 May 1978) was a British colonial administrator.

== Life ==
He was Governor of the Seychelles between 1951 and 1953. He was Deputy Governor of Kenya from 1953 to 1957 during the Mau Mau uprising. He was Governor of Uganda from 1957 to 1961. As governor of Uganda he believed it was too soon grant independence to Uganda, because he did not believe Uganda's economy could support itself as of the 1950s. However, he said he did favour the idea of independence, and that the British should begin laying the groundwork to make an independent Uganda economically sound. When Tanganyika was given independence Crawford felt this added pressure on himself to hurry up the timeline with regards to Uganda's independence. He believed that Uganda was far more prepared for independence than Tanganyika had been, with much more infrastructure, far more positions in the government already filled by Africans, and a more diversified economy. As Governor, Crawford called together a constitutional committee of African leaders from within Uganda to begin crafting a constitution that Uganda would ultimately have as an independent country "sometime within the next decade." When locally elected leaders of Uganda's government, specifically Milton Obote and the honourable A.G. Mehta, asked for more self-government, Crawford agreed and granted it.

Crawford became a director of the Anglo-American Corporation, and a resident of Rhodesia. His passport was withdrawn by the British government on 9 May 1968, while he was visiting London, because of his implicit support for Rhodesia's 1965 Unilateral Declaration of Independence, which Britain and the United Nations had deemed illegal. It was later returned.

Government offices
Preceded by Sir Andrew Cohen	Governor of Uganda; 1957–1961	Succeeded by Sir Walter Fleming Coutts
Preceded by Sir Percy Selwyn Selwyn-Clarke	Governor of the Seychelles; 1951–1953	Succeeded by Sir William Addis
