= Frederick John Jackson =

English ornithologist and colonial administrator (1860–1929)

Sir Frederick Jackson KCMG CB
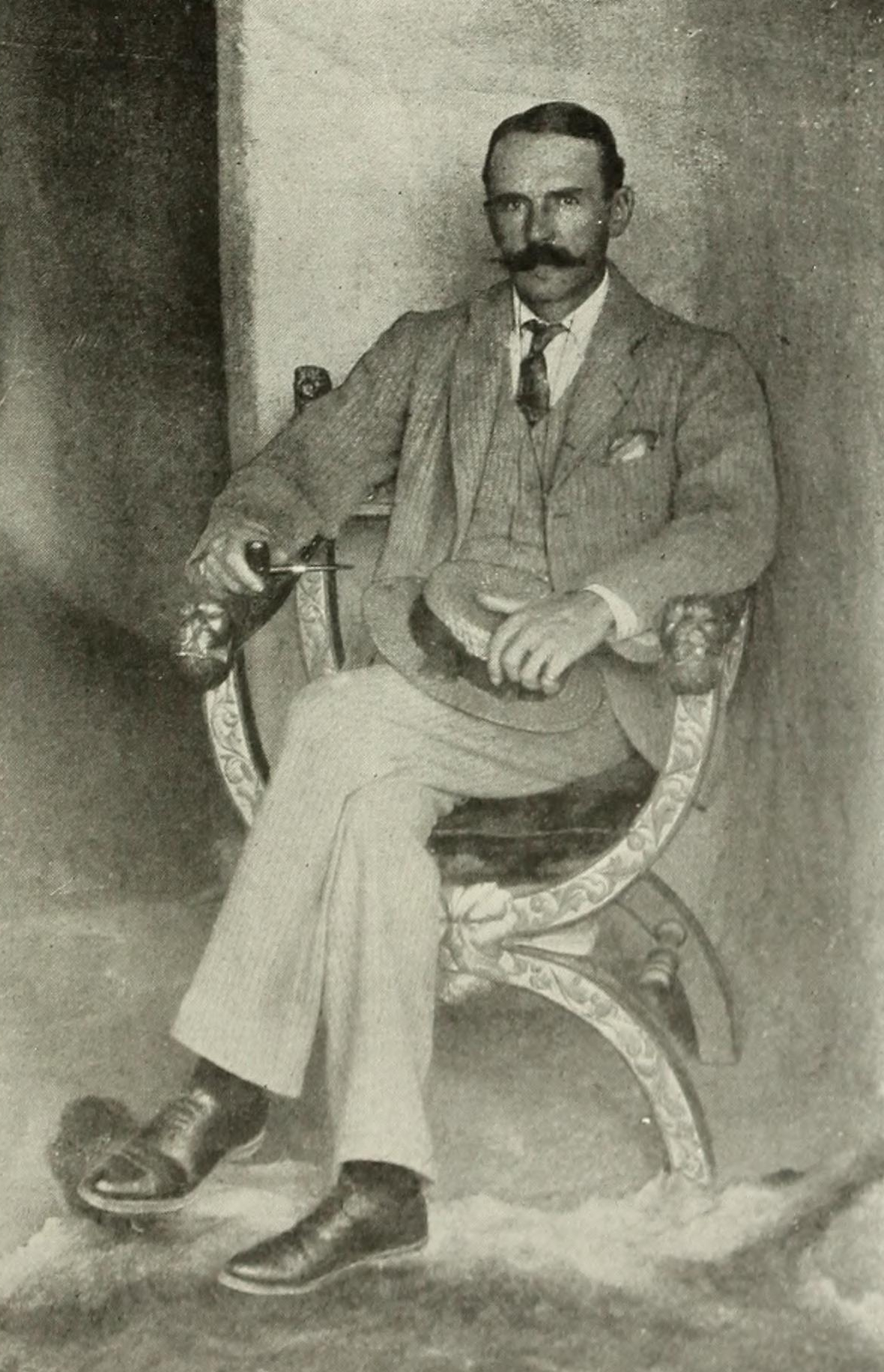

Governor of Uganda
- In office 1911–1918
- Preceded by: Harry Cordeaux
- Succeeded by: Robert Coryndon

Personal details
- Born: Frederick John Jackson; 17 February 1860 Catterick, North Yorkshire, England
- Died: 3 February 1929 (aged 68) Beaulieu-sur-Mer, France

Sir Frederick John Jackson, KCMG, CB (17 February 1860 – 3 February 1929) was an English administrator in East Africa, explorer and ornithologist. He was a founder of the East Africa Natural History Society.

== Early years ==
Jackson was the son of John Jackson, born at Oran Hall, near Catterick, North Yorkshire in 1860. He attended Shrewsbury School and then Jesus College, Cambridge. In 1884 he went to Africa on a shooting trip, joining J. G. Haggard, the British consul at Lamu. On this trip he explored the coast of what is now Kenya, the Tana River and Mount Kilimanjaro. As well as shooting big game, he collected birds and butterflies. Soon after the 1886 treaty was signed to delimit the German and British spheres of influence in East Africa he joined the Imperial British East Africa Company (IBEAC).

== Administrator ==
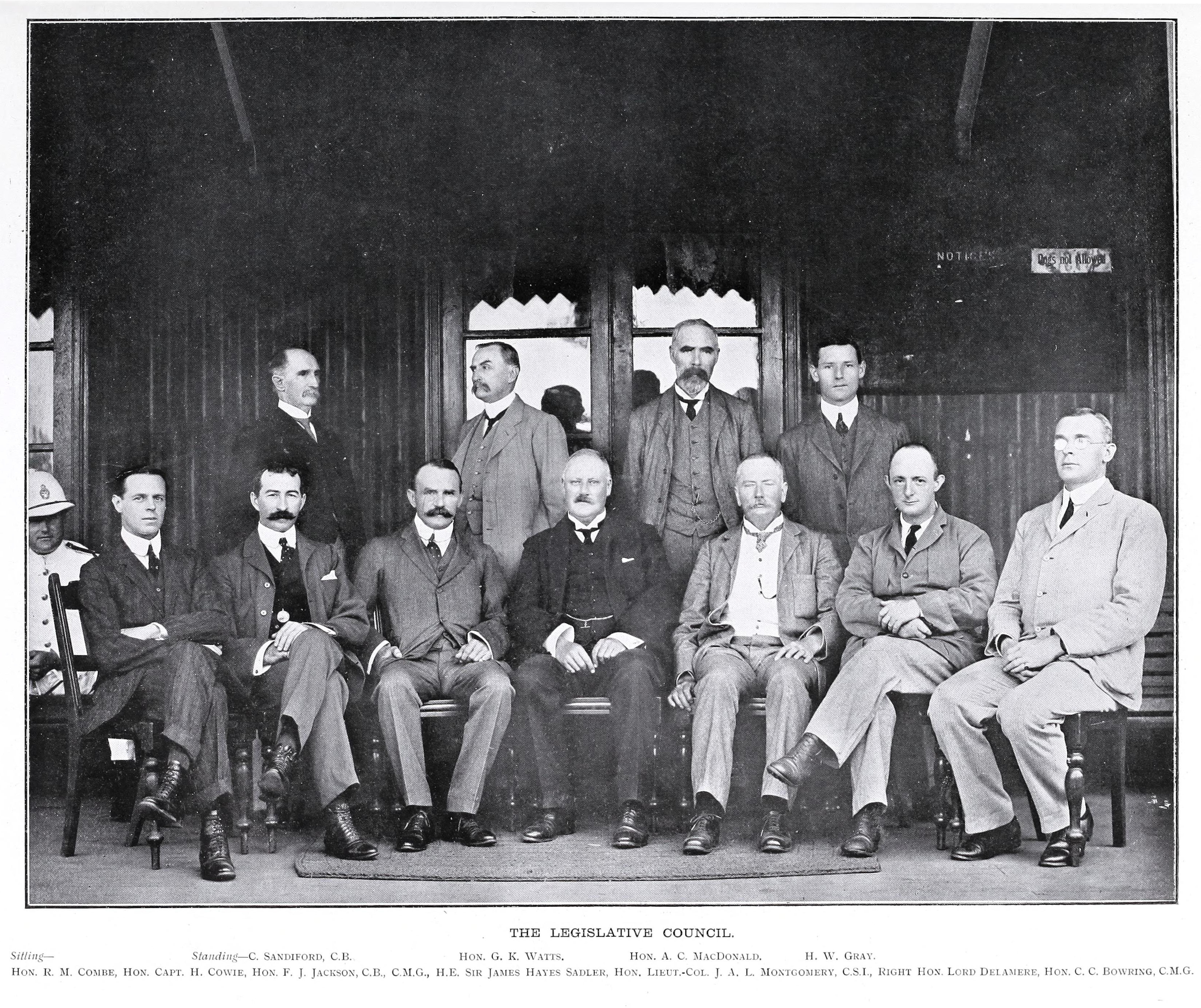
Jackson, seated, third from left, with monocle, c. 1908

In 1889 Jackson led an IBEAC expedition that included his friend and fellow explorer Arthur Neumann in the party designed to open up the regions between Mombasa and Lake Victoria, which was largely unknown to Europeans at that time, and if possible to obtain news of Emin Pasha. At Kavirondo he received a letter from King Mwanga II of Buganda in Uganda describing a state of great confusion there owing to rivalry between different Christian factions. He went north, exploring the country beyond Mount Elgon. On his return to Kavirondo he found that the German Karl Peters had passed him and raised the German flag, which he pulled down. He went on to Uganda where he found the Baganda uncertain about whether to accept an IBEAC administration. The decision was made for them by the Heligoland treaty of 1900 in which Britain was given Uganda.

The British government took over the administration of British East Africa from IBEAC in 1894, and Jackson became an official. He was Lieutenant-Governor of the East African Protectorate (1907–1911) and Governor of Uganda (1911–1917).

He was appointed a Companion of the Order of the Bath (CB) for services during the mutiny of Sudanese troops in Uganda in 1898. For his administrative work he was appointed a Companion of the Order of St Michael and St George (CMG) in the 1902 Coronation Honours list on 26 June 1902, and knighted as a Knight Commander (KCMG) of the same order in 1913. He retired in 1917.

== Naturalist ==
Jackson joined the British Ornithologists' Union in 1888. That year a paper by Jackson and Captain Shelley was published describing birds collected during his 1884–1886 trip to Africa. He collected many specimens in an 1898–1891 expedition to Uganda, and descriptions of this collection were published in a five-part paper in the Ibis in 1891–1892. Other papers described new species appeared in the Ibis and other journals between 1890 and 1917. Jackson was elected President of the East Africa and Uganda Natural History Society in 1910. He wrote nine of the nineteen chapters of Big Game Shooting, published in 1894. After retiring, he worked on a complete history of the Birds of East Africa and Uganda, which was unpublished when he died in 1929, following pneumonia. The Birds of Kenya Colony and the Uganda Protectorate was completed by William Lutley Sclater and published in 1938.

== Taxa named in his honor ==
Jackson is commemorated in the names of over 20 species or subspecies of birds, six mammal species, four reptile species, and several fish.

=== Birds ===
Jackson's spurfowl or Jackson's francolin (Pternistis jacksoni) is a species of bird in the family Phasianidae. It is found in Kenya and Uganda. Its preferred habitats include mountainous forests and stands of bamboo.

=== Reptiles ===
- Jackson's centipede eater, Aparallactus jacksonii (Günther, 1888)
- Jackson's black tree snake, Thrasops jacksonii Günther, 1895
- Jackson's chameleon, Trioceros jacksonii (Boulenger, 1896)
- Jackson's forest lizard, Adolfus jacksoni (Boulenger, 1899)

=== Fish ===
- Brycinus jacksonii (Boulenger 1912)
- Amphilius jacksonii Boulenger 1912
- Jackson's Barb, Enteromius jacksoni (Günther 1889)

== Bibliography ==
- Clive Phillipps-Wolley; Frederick John Jackson; Samuel White Baker (1894). Big game shooting, Volume 1. Little, Brown.
- Frederick John Jackson; completed by W.L. Sclater (1938). The birds of Kenya Colony and the Uganda Protectorate. London, Edinburgh: Gurney & Jackson.

Earl days in East Africa by Sir Frederick Jackson 1930 is Jackson’s recollection of his years in East Africa from 1884
