= Katiti Kironde =

American fashion designer

Katiti Kironde was the first African woman to model on the cover of a women's magazine. As a freshman at Harvard University she was featured on the cover of Glamour's college issue in August 1968. The issue that featured Kironde on the cover remains Glamour's best-selling issue. After graduating from Harvard, Kironde further established herself in the fashion industry over three decades. Kironde launched her eponymous clothing line that focused on designing white shirts along with her husband, architect William Winder, in Boston.

She also taught a non-credit freshman course at Harvard, "An Introduction To Fashion," in 2010.

Kironde is the daughter of Apollo Kironde, who was Uganda's first Ambassador to the United Nations.

== See also ==
- Ugandan Americans
