= Jackson's barb =

Conservation status
- Least Concern (IUCN 3.1)

Scientific classification
- Kingdom: Animalia
- Phylum: Chordata
- Class: Actinopterygii
- Order: Cypriniformes
- Family: Cyprinidae
- Subfamily: Smiliogastrinae
- Genus: Enteromius
- Species: E. jacksoni

Binomial name
- Enteromius jacksoni (Günther, 1889)

Synonyms
- Barbus jacksoni Günther, 1889

Species of fish

The Jackson's barb (Enteromius jacksoni) is a species of cyprinid fish.

It is found in Kenya, Tanzania, and Uganda. Its natural habitats are rivers, intermittent rivers, and inland deltas. It is not considered a threatened species by the IUCN.

== Size ==
This species reaches a length of 11.6 cm (4.6 in).

== Etymology ==
The fish is named in honor of Frederick John Jackson (1859-1929), an English administrator, explorer and ornithologist, who secured the type specimen.
