= Kitamilo =

- Location in Uganda
- Coordinates: 00°14′12″N 33°16′12″E
- Country: Uganda
- Region: Central Uganda
- District: Buvuma District
- Elevation: 3,900 ft (1,200 m)

Kitamilo is a town in Buvuma District, in Central Uganda. It is the main municipal, administrative and commercial center of the district. The district headquarters are located there.

== Location ==
Kitamiiro is located on one of the fifty-two (52) islands that constitute the district of Buvuma, in Central Uganda. The exact location of Kitamiiro is not yet known, because it does not yet appear on most publicly available maps.

== See also ==
- Buvuma District
- Central Uganda
- Lake Victoria
