= Mukasa (deity) =

Deity in the Buganda religion

Mukasa, known as Mugasa in the Runyakitara/Rutara languages, is a member of the pantheon of gods or balubaale in Baganda traditional religion and is considered the god of prosperity, harvest, fertility, and health. In several accounts, he is also associated with divination and prophecies. Mukasa was originally a hero who ascended to become a deity. He is one of the highest ranked gods in the balubaale, and in some sources, is known as its chief.

Mukasa is also recognized as the guardian of Lake Victoria. His primary temple is located in Bubembe Island and is still present to this day.

== Representation ==
Mukasa is depicted as a benevolent god or lubaale. He is supposed to dwell in lakes. According to Apollo Kaggwa's (1934) accounts of the Baganda people, Mukasa is one of the most important gods and is widely worshipped.

== Family ==
Mukasa is the son of the god Wanema and is the grandson of Musisi, the personification of earthquake. He has a brother, the god of war, Kibuka. He had three wives: Nalwaŋga, with whom he had two children (Lwaŋga and Musozi); Nadjemba, who also had two children (Buguŋgu and Kisituka) with him; and Naku, who bore three of his children (Kaumpuli, Nairuma, and Nanziri). His wives and children are also part of the balubaale.

== Myths ==
=== Ascension to godhood ===
When Mukasa was a boy, he suddenly disappeared. When people searched for him, they eventually found Mukasa sitting under a tree in an island far away from his home. Due to this odd occurrence, the people considered Mukasa as a superhuman being, and in his honor, built him a house. Mukasa lived there for a while, helping humans with issues regarding health and prosperity. It is said that Mukasa ate only the heart, liver, and blood of the animals. According to one source, the mortal Mukasa eventually died and became a god. Another source, however, said that Mukasa simply disappeared from earth.
