= Young Baganda Association =

Political party in Uganda

The Young Baganda Association was a political party created in the Uganda protectorate in 1919 by Z.K. Sentongo. It broke up in 1922.

== Claims and composition ==
=== Generational conflict ===
The 1900 Uganda agreement merged many kingdoms into the boundaries of today's Uganda. The most powerful of these ancient kingdoms was Buganda, mainly inhabited by Baganda people: British invaders gave political power to its African customary chiefs, who gathered in a Council (Lukiko) and presided over by the king (Kabaka). They were also given land in order to gain their fidelity.

However, the spread of schools caused a generation of young educated people to appear, working in the colonial administration but removed from real local power. Some of them, led by Baganda publicist Z.K. Sentongo, founded the Young Baganda Association to protest against customary chiefs’ power: they are symptomatic of generational conflict in colonial Uganda.

=== Other claims ===
They also claimed for the end of Indian's privilege on cotton ginning (many Indians had emigrated to Uganda during the construction of Mombasa-Lake Victoria railway) and for a better educational system, since they considered missionaries did not give them good enough an education.

== Radicalisation and disappearance ==
Around 1921, their claims became harder both toward Indians and the chiefs. Sentongo accused the Indians to be responsible of “exploiting” Baganda while some other members asked for departure of the Kabaka and establishment of a republic.

Three of them were jailed by order of the Kabaka in June 1922. This event scared its mostly moderated members and the association broke up later the same year.
