= Alexander Giles =

Sir Alexander Falconer Giles, KBE, CMG (16 September 1915 – 11 April 1989) was a British colonial administrator.

== Biography ==
The son of A. F. Giles, a lecturer in classical history at the University of Edinburgh, Alexander Giles was educated at The Edinburgh Academy, the University of Edinburgh, and Balliol College, Oxford, where he graduated with a BA. He was elected President of the Oxford Union for Michaelmas 1939, but did not hold office because of war service. Commissioned a second lieutenant in the Royal Scots in 1940, he was attached to the Royal West African Frontier Force in 1941 and the 81st (West African) Division in 1941. In 1945, he was Lieutenant-Colonel commanding the 5th Battalion, Gold Coast Regiment. For his war service, he was appointed a MBE and mentioned in despatches.

Giles joined the Colonial Service as a cadet in Tanganyika in 1947. From 1955 to 1961/2 he was Administrator of St Vincent and from 1962 to 1965 he was Resident Commissioner for Basutoland, the last holder of the post. From 1965 to the territory's independence as Lesotho in 1966, he was the British government representative in the territory.

After his retirement from the Colonial Service, he was chairman of the Victoria League in Scotland from 1968 to 1970, chairman of the Scottish Council of the Royal Over-Seas League from 1969 to 1970, and of its Central Council from 1972 to 1975. He was director of Toc H from 1968 to 1974, and general secretary for Scotland of the Royal Over-Seas League from 1976 to 1978.

=== Personal life ===
Giles married in 1953 Mrs M. E. Watson, daughter of Lieutenant-Colonel R. F. D. Burnett, MC, and widow of Lieutenant-Colonel J. L. Watson; they had two stepsons and one stepdaughter.
