= Alexander Beattie =

Lieutenant-Colonel Alexander Elder Beattie CMG CBE MC (25 January 1888 – 15 April 1951) was a British Army officer and colonial administrator.

The son of an Army officer, Beattie was born at Stirling Castle and enlisted in the Argyll and Sutherland Highlanders in 1906. Two years later he was commissioned into the Queen's Royal Regiment. He served in India and Aden and was seconded to the Royal West African Frontier Force in 1911, serving in the Nigeria Regiment and as a staff officer. During the First World War he saw active service on the Nigeria-Cameroon frontier and won the Military Cross (MC). He was appointed Commander of the Order of the British Empire (CBE) for his war service in the 1920 New Year Honours.

In 1922 he retired from the Army as a Brevet Lieutenant-Colonel, joined the Colonial Administrative Service and was appointed an Assistant Secretary in Gibraltar. He then served in the Falkland Islands and Cyprus, and returned to Gibraltar as Colonial Secretary in 1930, holding the post until 1941, when he was appointed Administrator of St Vincent. He was appointed Companion of the Order of St Michael and St George (CMG) in 1933.

He returned to England in 1944 and was appointed Colonial Office Regional Welfare Officer for Scotland and North-East England until his retirement in 1947. He was temporarily re-employed on special service by the Colonial Office in 1949.
