= Andrew Cohen (colonial administrator) =

British colonial administrator; Governor of Uganda (1952–57)

Sir Andrew Cohen KCMG KCVO OBE

Governor of Uganda
- In office 1952–1957
- Preceded by: John Hall
- Succeeded by: Frederick Crawford

Personal details
- Born: 7 October 1909 Berkhamsted, England
- Died: 17 June 1968 (aged 58) London, England
- Education: Malvern College
- Alma mater: Trinity College, Cambridge

Sir Andrew Benjamin Cohen KCMG KCVO OBE (7 October 1909 – 17 June 1968) was Governor of Uganda from 1952 to 1957.

== Early life and education ==
Cohen was from a distinguished Anglo-Jewish family. He was a descendant of Levy Barent Cohen. He was educated at Malvern College and Trinity College, Cambridge, receiving a degree in Classics. He was a Cambridge Apostle.

== Gold Coast ==
In 1947, Cohen was appointed Assistant Under-Secretary for the Colonial Office's Africa division. This same year, he issued the Cohen Report which recommended the gradual devolution of power to Africans. However, only the Gold Coast was deemed to be capable of self-government "within a generation".

In 1948, a British inquiry was launched by the Labour government into the causes of a series of riots in the Gold Coast. Colonial Secretary Arthur Creech Jones and Cohen sent Aiken Watson, a supporter of the Fabian Society who had previously stood as a Labour candidate in the 1935 election, to tour the colony and question witnesses. Cohen advised Watson and his colleagues to "report on the disturbances...and their underlying causes: and to make recommendations on any matter arising". The resulting Watson report recommended wide reaching constitutional reform.

Many colonial officials in the Gold Coast and some civil servants in London considered the report to be an extreme overreaction. Creech Jones claimed he was startled by its radical findings; however, the cabinet approved of Cohen's findings. The Report facilitated the release of key nationalist leaders, including future prime minister Kwame Nkrumah, and the replacement of Sir Gerald Creasy, the governor of the Gold Coast, with the more liberal Charles Arden-Clarke. Arden-Clarke held this position until Ghanaian independence in 1957, a process he helped to facilitate.

== Rhodesia and Nyasaland ==
As Colonial Office Assistant Undersecretary for African Affairs, Cohen was involved in negotiations for a federal state for the Rhodesias and Nyasaland in 1950. The Jewish Cohen, traumatised by the Holocaust, was an anti-racialist and an advocate of African rights. However, he compromised his ideals to combat a threat that he perceived to be even more menacing: the risk that Southern Rhodesia, if it turned hostile, would fall into the orbit of the National Party government in South Africa.

To Cohen, the risk of radical Afrikaner white supremacy posed a greater menace than the perpetuation of the less inflexible, paternalistic white ascendancy system of Southern Rhodesia. Having come to terms with this compromise, Cohen went on to become one of the central architects and driving forces behind the creation of the Federation, often seemingly single-handedly untangling deadlocks and outright walkouts on the part of the respective parties.

The negotiations and conferences were indeed arduous. Southern Rhodesia and the Northern Territories had very different traditions when it came to the 'Native Question' (Africans) and the roles they were designed to play in civil society. Thus, it took nearly three years for the CAF to be established. And, once it was established, it proved to be "one of the most elaborately governed countries in the world."

== Governor of Uganda ==
In 1952 he was appointed Governor of Uganda, with the task of preparing that country for independence. He reorganised the Legislative Council (LEGCO) to include African representatives elected from districts throughout Uganda, thus creating the basis for a representative parliament. He also introduced economic initiatives, including the establishment of the Uganda Development Corporation.

In 1953 the Lukiiko (Parliament) of Buganda sought independence from Uganda. Sir Edward Mutesa II, the Kabaka (king) of Buganda, demanded that Buganda be separated from the rest of the protectorate and transferred to Foreign Office jurisdiction. On 30 November, Cohen deposed the Kabaka and ordered his exile to London. His forced departure made the Kabaka an instant martyr in the eyes of the Baganda, whose latent separatism and anticolonial sentiments set off a storm of protest. Cohen's action had backfired, and he could find no one among the Baganda prepared or able to mobilise support for his schemes. After two frustrating years of unrelenting Ganda hostility and obstruction, Governor Cohen was forced to reinstate "Kabaka Freddie". The Kabaka returned to Kampala on 17 October 1955. Abu Mayanja was among those who escorted Sir Edward Mutesa from his London exile in 1955.

The negotiations leading to the Kabaka's return, although appearing to satisfy the British, were a resounding victory for the Baganda. Cohen secured the Kabaka's agreement not to oppose independence within the larger Uganda framework. Not only was the Kabaka reinstated in return, but for the first time since 1889, the monarch was given the power to appoint and dismiss his chiefs (Buganda government officials) instead of acting as a mere figurehead while they conducted the affairs of government. The Kabaka's new power was cloaked in the misleading claim that he would be only a "constitutional monarch," while in fact he was a leading player in deciding how Uganda would be governed, and would become the country's first president in 1962.

== UN Trusteeship Council ==
From 1957 Cohen was the UK representative to the United Nations Trusteeship Council. In 1959 he was a member of the Special Mission to Samoa to negotiate its independence from New Zealand. He was involved in the transfer of the Trust Territory of Southern Cameroons to the Republic of Cameroon (former French Cameroon) on 1 October 1961. Cohen had argued against offering independence to the territory, and pro-independence Southern Cameroonians blamed him for the fact that the UN did not allow that question to be put.

== Later life ==
Cohen was Permanent Secretary of the Minister of Overseas Development from 1964 until his death from a heart attack in 1968.

Government offices
Preceded by John Hall	Governor of Uganda; 1952–1957	Succeeded by Frederick Crawford
