= Susan Mugabi Nakaziba =

Ugandan politician

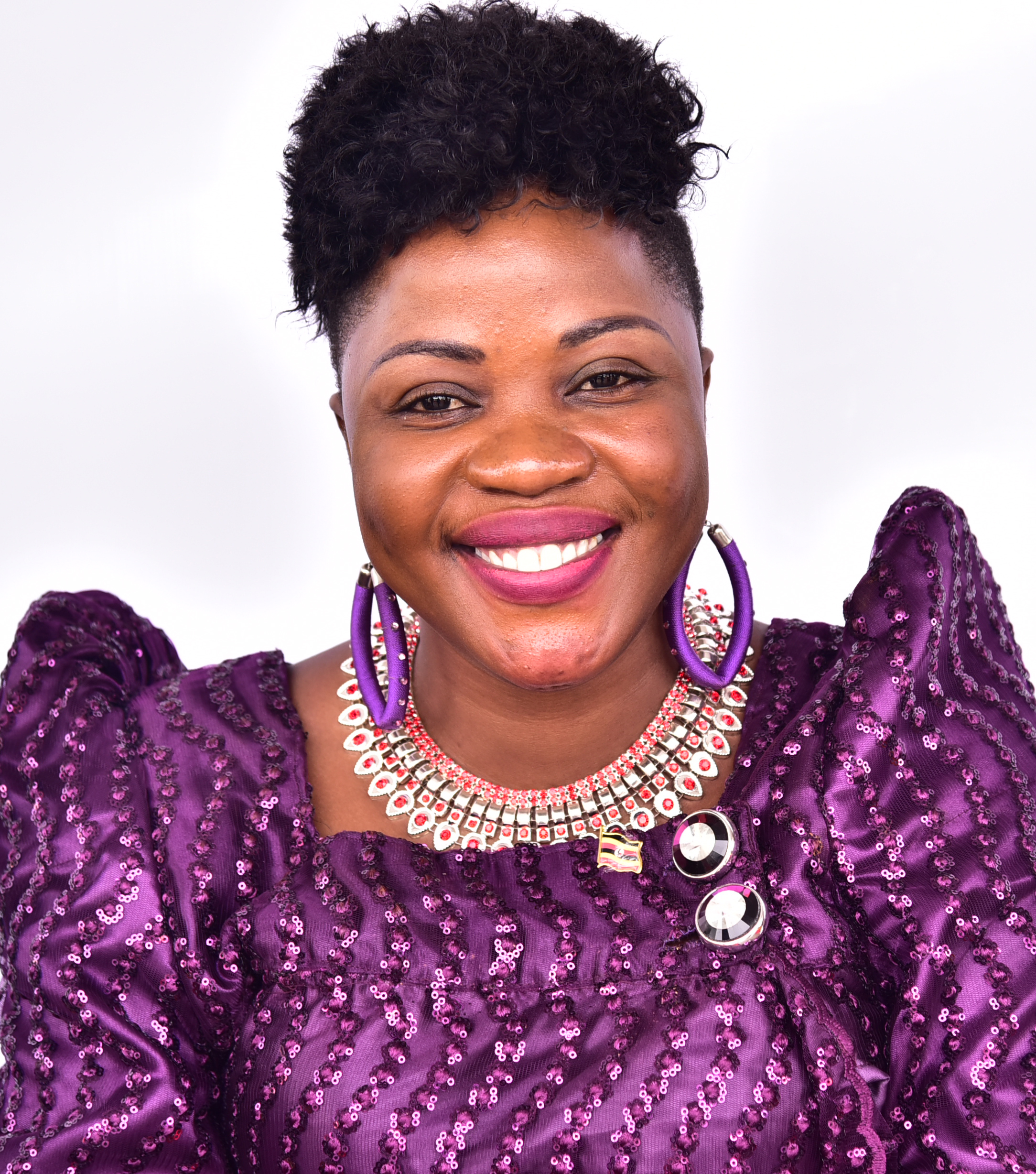

Member of Parliament
- Incumbent
- Assumed office 24 May 2021

Personal details
- Party: National Unity Platform
- Occupation: Politician

Susan Mugabi Nakaziba is an Ugandan politician from the NUP who represents Buvuma District in the Parliament of Uganda.

In 2021, she protested against harassment of fishing communities.

== See also ==
- List of members of the eleventh Parliament of Uganda
