= Robert Migadde =

Ugandan politician

Robert Migadde Ndugwa
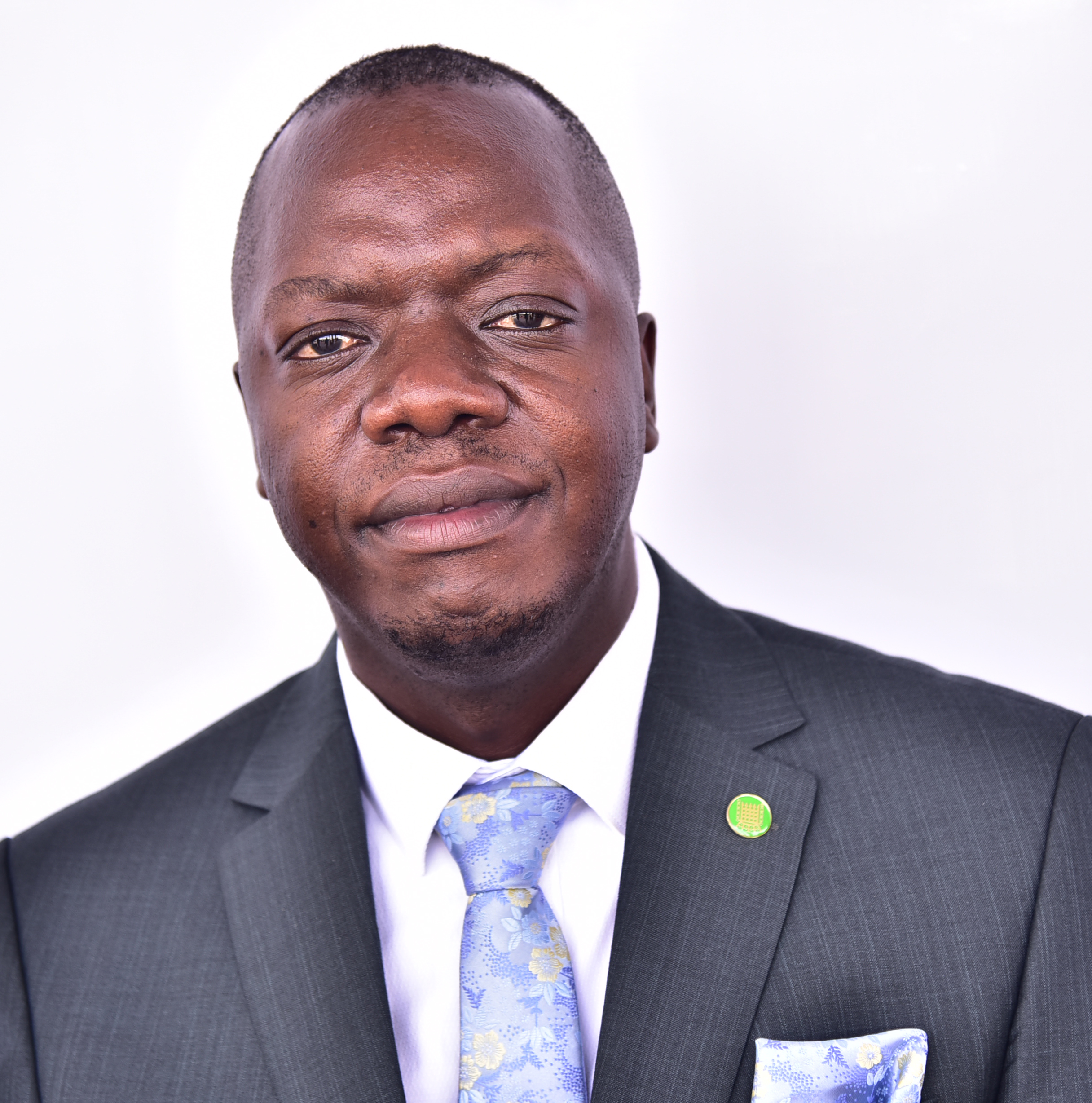

Member of Parliament of Uganda from Buvuma Island County
- Incumbent
- Assumed office 2021

Personal details
- Born: December 8, 1980
- Party: National Resistance Movement (NRM)
- Education: Makerere University

Robert Ndugwa Migadde (born 7 December 1980) is a Ugandan politician and member of parliament from Buvuma Island County. He is a member of National Resistance Movement (NRM). He sits on the committees on National Economy and Agriculture.

== Early life and education ==
Migadde is a Christian and a member of the Catholic denomination. He earned a bachelor's degree in urban planning and a master's degree in business administration from Makerere University before obtaining a post-graduate diploma in urban economic development from Galilee College, Israel.

== Career ==
Migadde is the member of Parliament for Buvuma County in Buvuma Islands. He is also the chairperson of the Buganda Parliamentary caucus succeeding Muwanga Kivumbi. Migadde was appointed minister for fisheries in the 2026-2031 Uganda cabinet by President Yoweri Museveni.
