= Uganda National Teachers Union =

Agency overview
- Formed: 2006
- Jurisdiction: Government of Uganda
- Website: homepage

Uganda National Teachers Union (abbreviation: UNATU) is a Ugandan Teachers' Union.

== Background ==
Originally active as the Uganda Teachers Association (UTA), the Teachers' Association renamed itself the Uganda National Teachers' Union in March 2003 and thereby complied with the Trade Union Act of 1971. In 2006, these laws were updated with the Labor Unions Act. UNATU has been recognized as a charitable organization since 2006. With its 140,000 members, it is the largest and oldest teacher union in the country.

One of the major tasks is collective bargaining and the attractiveness of the teaching profession. Uganda, once a pioneer in education policy within Africa, is now a developing country in the field of education. Low salary and a class size of 120 students makes the profession of being a teacher unattractive. Since its inception, the union has been calling for a 100% increase in pay, as well as benefits such as travel allowance, health insurance and pension increases. In 2011, the union called for a strike and was able to demand concessions from Yoweri Museveni in the upcoming elections, which were diluted again as a result. At the same time, however, the union itself was in the Kitik, as they view the spin-off Uganda Liberal Teachers Union (ULTU) selects members selectively and their structures are non-transparent.

Since 2016 UNATU has been negotiating with Janet Museveni, acting Minister of Education and First Lady of Uganda. In the negotiations, they could enforce at least a 50% wage increase and education spending under Museveni rose significantly. Education experts caution that prolonged industrial action may harm students' academic performance if not resolved quickly, urging the government and teachers to hold meaningful discussions
