= Buvuma District =

Buvuma District Buvuma
- District
- District location in Uganda
- Coordinates: 00°14′N 33°16′E
- Country: Uganda
- Region: Central Uganda
- Capital: Kitamilo

Government
  - Members of Parliament: Robert Migadde; Susan Mugabi Nakaziba

Area
  - Land: 218.3 km^{2} (84.3 sq mi)
- Elevation: 1,340 m (4,400 ft)

Population (2014 NPHC)
  - Total: 89,890
  - Density: 253.3/km^{2} (656/sq mi)
- Time zone: UTC+3 (EAT)
- Website: www.buvuma.go.ug

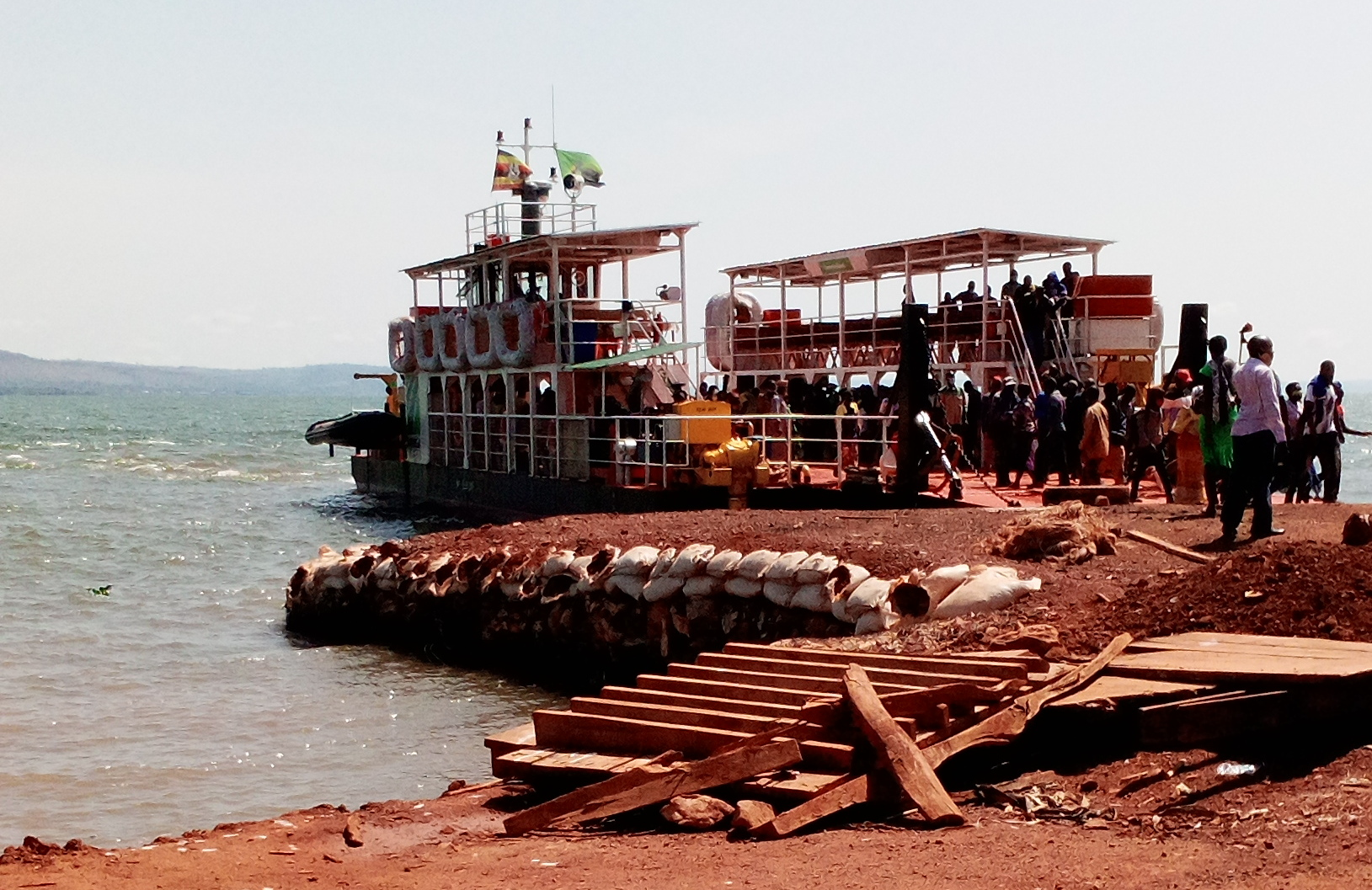
MV Buvuma ferry that transports people from Uganda's largest landing site Kiyindi on Lake Victoria to Kirongo on Buvuma an Island district.

Buvuma District is a district in the Central Region of Uganda. The district is coterminous with the Buvuma Islands archipelago in Lake Victoria and does not have territory on mainland Uganda.

== Location ==
Buvuma District is bordered by Jinja District to the north, Mayuge District to the east, Tanzania to the south, and Buikwe District to the west and northwest. Kitamilo, the district headquarters, is approximately 30 kilometres (19 mi) south of the city of Jinja, the nearest large metropolitan area.

== Overview ==
Buvuma District is made up of 52 scattered islands in the northern part of Lake Victoria. The largest island is called Buvuma, the name adopted by the new district, which was created by Act of Parliament on 1 July 2010. Before that, it was part of Mukono District. Administratively, the district is subdivided into nine administrative units:

1. Bugaya Sub-county
2. Busamuzi Sub-county
3. Bweema Sub-county
4. Nairambi Sub-county
5. Buvuma Town Council
6. Buwooya Sub-County
7. Lwajje Sub-County
8. Lubya Sub-county
9. Lyabaana Sub-county

== Population ==
In 1991, the national population census estimated the population of the district at 18,500. During the 2002 national census, the population of Buvuma District was estimated at 42,500. In the 2014 National Population and Housing Census, the population stood at 89,890.

== Economic activities ==
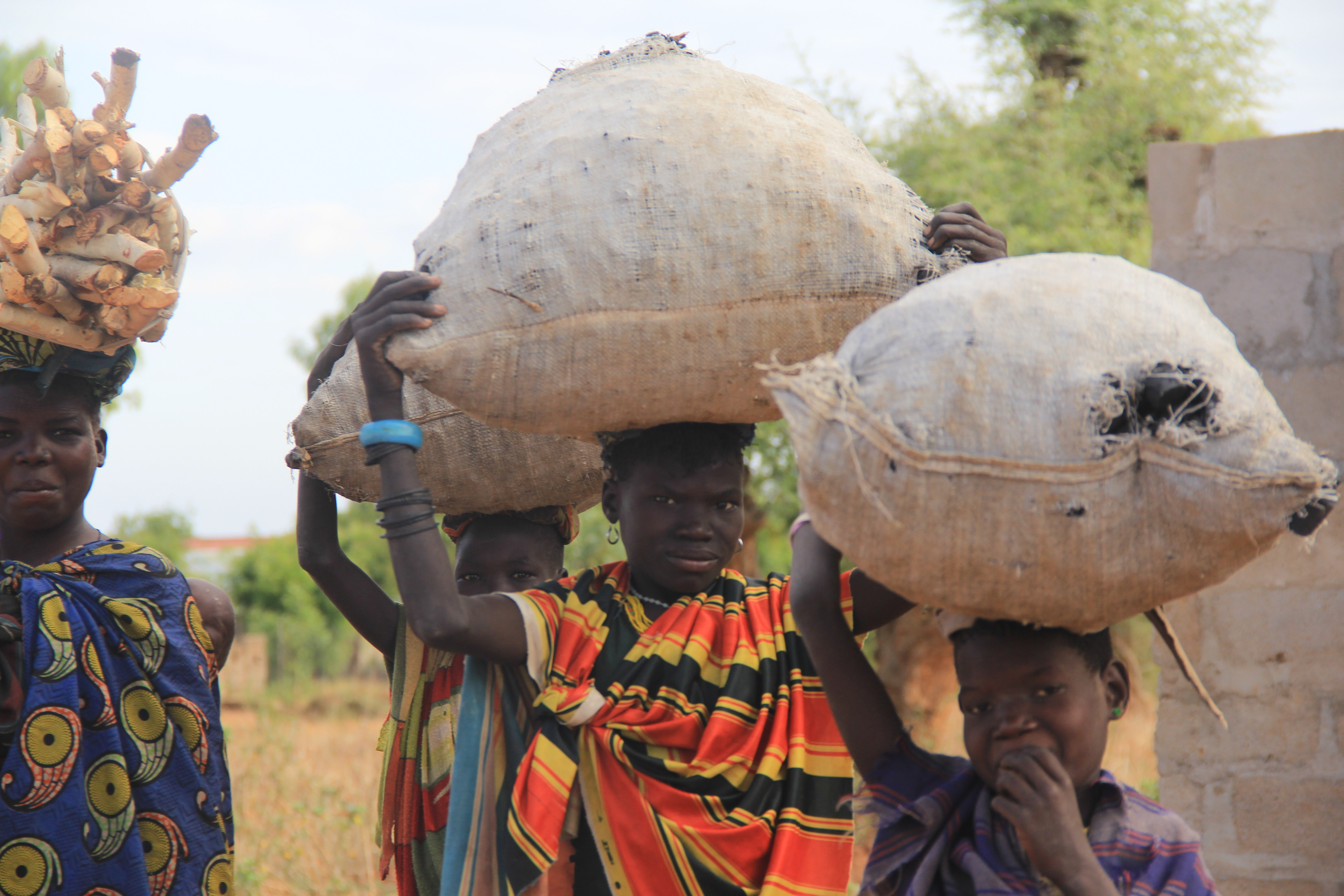
Women gathering and collecting charcoal from kilns for home use.

The four main activities in the district are: (a) Fishing (b) Tourism (c) Logging and (d) Manufacture of charcoal. Subsistence agriculture is practiced by the inhabitants of the islands. The majority of the islanders depend a lot on fishing. Overfishing is a concern. The district has twenty-six gazetted forest reserves, although many are threatened by unregulated logging and burning to make charcoal. Little livestock farming is practiced in the district, with the majority of livestock consumed locally in the district.

== See also ==
- Districts of Uganda
