= John Hathorn Hall =

British colonial administrator

Sir John Hathorn Hall GCMG DSO OBE MC (19 June 1894 – 17 June 1979) was a British colonial administrator.

During World War I, he served with the 8th Royal Munster Fusiliers and the 27th Infantry Brigade, rising to the rank of captain, and was awarded the Military Cross as well as the Belgian Croix de Guerre. He worked in the Ministry of Finance of the Egyptian Civil Service (Egypt then being a British protectorate) in 1919–1920. Subsequently he served in the Middle East Department of the Colonial Office and was awarded an OBE in the New Year Honours List of 1931.

In 1927, Hall married Torfrida Trevenen Mills. In 1933, he was appointed Chief Secretary to the Government of Palestine (then a British Mandate under the League of Nations). On at least two occasions, in 1934 and in 1937, he served as Officer Administering the Government of Palestine during absences of the High Commissioner for Palestine.

His later service included the following posts:

- British Resident in Zanzibar, October 1937 – 1940
- Governor and Commander-in-Chief of Aden, 24 October 1940 – 1 January 1945
- Governor and Commander-in-Chief of Uganda, 1 January 1945 – 17 January 1952

Sir John was awarded the GCMG in the New Year's Honours List of 1950. After retiring from the colonial service, Sir John became a director of several companies, including the P&O and British India steamship lines, and the Midland Bank. A portrait of Sir John by Walter Bird is now part of the collection of the National Portrait Gallery.
