= List of governors of Uganda =

Military administrators Uganda

Governor of Uganda
- Standard of the Governor of Uganda
- Reports to: The Monarch of the United Kingdom
- Residence: State House, Entebbe
- Formation: 26 December 1890
- First holder: Frederick John Dealtry Lugard
- Final holder: Walter Coutts
- Abolished: 9 October 1962

This is a list of military administrators, commissioners, governors and governors-general of Uganda.

The governor of Uganda was ultimately replaced by a president of Uganda after a brief transition to a governor-general.

== Military administrator, 1890–1892 ==
- Frederick John Dealtry Lugard (b. 1858 – d. 1945) 26 December 1890 – May 1892

== Commissioners, 1893–1910 ==
- Sir Gerald Herbert Portal (b. 1858 – d. 1897): 1 April 1893 – 30 May 1893
- James Ronald Leslie MacDonald (b. 1862 – d. 1927): 30 May 1893 – 4 November 1893 (acting)
- Sir Henry Edward Colville (b. 1852 – d. 1907): 4 November 1893 – 10 May 1894
- Frederick Jackson: 10 May 1894 – 24 August 1894 (acting)
- George Wilson CB (b. 1862 – d. 1943): Dec 1894 (civil charge), 31 July 1895 (sub), 5 November 1897 - 29 January 1898 (acting and consul-general), 1 April 1902 - 1904 (deputy and vice-consul general), 1904-1907 (Acting Commissioner, HM Commander-in-Chief and Consul-General)
- Ernest James Berkeley (b. 1857 – d. 1932): 24 August 1894 – December 1899
- Sir Harry Hamilton Johnston (b. 1858 – d. 1927): December 1899 – November 1901
- Sir James Hayes Sadler (b. 1851 – d. 1910): 1 January 1902 – 20 November 1907 (Commissioner, Commander-in-Chief and Consul-General)
- Sir Henry Hesketh Joudou Bell (b. 1864 – d. 1952): 20 November 1907 – 31 January 1910
- Sir Harry Edward Spiller Cordeaux (b. 1870 – d. 1943): 1 Feb 1910 – 18 Oct 1910

== Governors of Uganda, 1910–1962 ==
- Sir Harry Cordeaux: 1910–1911 (also Commissioner in early 1910)
- Sir Frederick Jackson: 1911–1918
- Sir Robert Coryndon: 1918–1922
- Sir Geoffrey Archer: 1922–1925
- Sir William Gowers: 1925–1932
- Sir Bernard Henry Bourdillon: 1932–1935
- Sir Philip Mitchell: 1935–1940
- Sir Charles Dundas: 1940–1945
- Sir John Hathorn Hall: 1945–1952
- Sir Andrew Cohen: 1952–1957
- Sir Frederick Crawford: 1957–1961
- Sir Walter Coutts: 1961–1962 (also Governor-General until 1963)

== Governor-General of Uganda, 1962–1963 ==
- Sir Walter Coutts: 9 October 1962 – 9 October 1963

== See also ==
- President of Uganda
- Prime Minister of Uganda
- Lists of office-holders
