= Buvuma Island =

Island in northern Lake Victoria

Coordinates: 0°13′N 33°16′E

Buvuma Island (sometimes 'Uvuma', locally) is the largest island in the Buvuma Islands chain, in Lake Victoria in Africa.

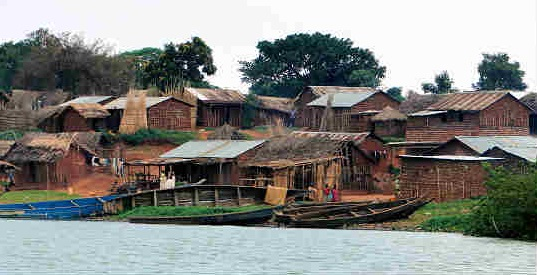
Buvuma Island

== Location ==
The chain of islands known as Buvuma Islands consists of more than fifty islands and is located a few kilometres off the northern shores of Lake Victoria, Uganda in the Napoleon Gulf. Buvuma is approximately 25 kilometres (16 mi), by water, south of the major city of Jinja, and around 90 kilometres (56 mi), south-east of the national capital, Kampala. By ferry, Buvuma is approximately one hour from Kiyindi It is part of the wider Buganda region, and was administered as part of Mukono but was recently made into a district of its own by the government of Uganda.

== Description ==
The main island is Buvuma, with a land area of around 200 square-miles (517 km^{2}), and a population of around 20,000. It is forested, and is a destination for intrepid bird-watching tourists. The forest is being cut and burned to provide three boats a day full of charcoal for the nearby city of Jinja. There are twenty-six gazetted Forest Reserves in Buvuma.

== Transportation and health ==
There is a somewhat unreliable ferry to the mainland. There are also unofficial small boat services from Kiyindi, a major fishing village on the shores of Lake Victoria. Boat taxis provide transportation daily from the islands to Masese, a landing site near Jinja. There are two health centres, but no electricity on the island. Sleeping sickness and tsetse flies are major concerns. Because of the communities' heavy reliance on the lake water, which is infested with parasites, inhabitants are susceptible to Bilharzia.

== Economy ==
The area is very poor compared to other parts of Uganda because funds allocated to it are often diverted before they reach the island.

The waters around the islands are rich in fish, and the local Bavuma and Basoga are fishermen.

In 2012, Bidco Palm Oil Limited, a regional edible oil manufacturer, unveiled plans to establish a 6,500 hectares (16,000 acres) palm oil plantation and processing factory, beginning in 2013. With another 3,500 hectares (8,600 acres), in a planned outgrowers' scheme, the entire Bidco Palm Oil Project on Buvuma Island is expected to grow to 10,000 hectares (25,000 acres), when completed.

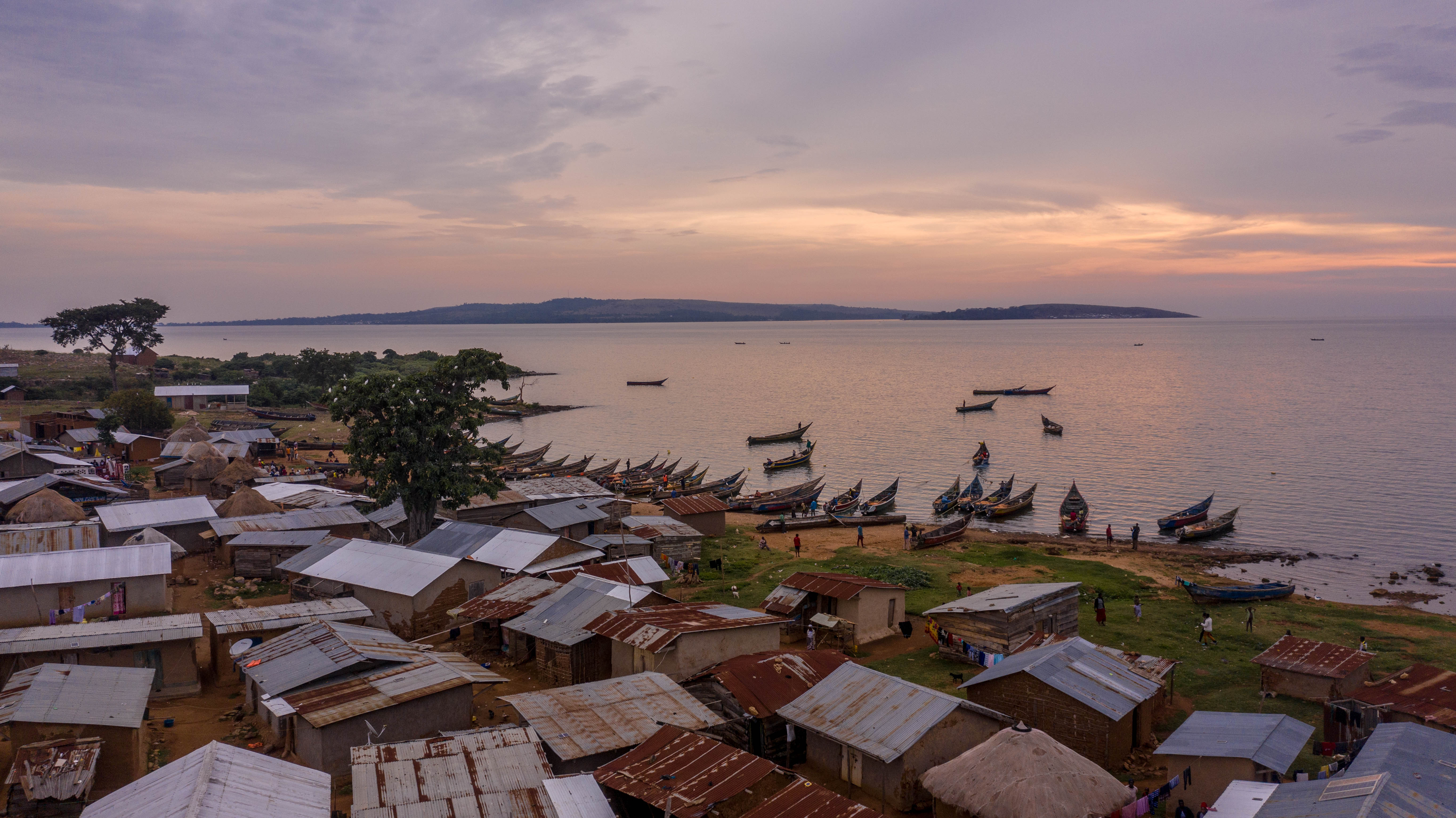
Buvuma Island landing site

== Education and religion ==
Most adults are illiterate and speak no English (one of the official languages of Uganda).

One third of the population is Muslim, one third is animist, and the other one third is Christian. The longest running missionary project is Youth With A Mission (YWAM) on Lingira Island. They have a primary health care and community development project that has been running since 1991. On the main island of Buvuma, the World Gospel Mission does some limited child immunization, clean water projects, trains traditional birth attendants, and sponsors a primary school.

== Parliamentary representative ==
The Buvuma elected Parliamentary representative (2001-2006 and 2006-2011) was William Nsubuga. He succeeded John Richard Wasswa who reigned from 1996 to 2001. In 2011 Migadde Robert Ndugwa was elected to replace Nsubuga. In 2016, Migadde Robert Ndugwa was re-elected for the second term that ended 2021. He contested again for the same position in the 2026 Ugandan general election and won.

== Geology and deforestation ==
The islands are of ironstone formation overlying quartzite and crystalline schists. Other islands are Bugaya, Lingira (pop. 1000), and Namiti. Rusinga and Mfangano are within Kenyan borders. The 1911 Britannica said: "Most of these islands are densely forested, and some of them attain considerable elevation. Their scenery is of striking beauty." Except at the highest elevations, Rusinga and Mfangano are today largely deforested.

Buvuma district is a unique place with dense tropical forests with a range of insects, birds, animals, plant species, alongside sandy beaches at various Islands. The islands are naturally gifted with a number of tourism attraction sites, that promotes: Birding, Camping, Viewing wildlife, Nature walks, Site seeing, Rocks climbing, Boat riding, Forest hikes, Nature photography, Sport fishing, Sunsetting moments, Water games, among others, that you will see when you venture in Buvuma Islands.

== Archaeological research ==
Rusinga is rich in fossils, and Mary Leakey found the skull of Proconsul africanus on the island. The Miocene floras of Rusinga and Mfwanganu islands are subject to a long-term study by paleobotanists. There was an archaeological prospection carried out by the Tervuren Museum, Belgium, in 1968 (published 1971), on Buvuma and Bugaia islands at Munyama Cave, Tonge Cave, and Nakisito, plus another 47 sites. Pottery materials from 13,000 B.C. to 8,000 B.C. were found.

== See also ==
- Damba Island
- Bugala Island
- Bulingugwe Island
