= Apollo Kironde =

Ugandan lawyer and diplomat

Ambassador of Uganda to the United Nations
- In office 1962–1964
- Preceded by: Position established
- Succeeded by: Dr. Solomon Bayo Asea

Personal details
- Born: 1915 Uganda
- Died: 21 April 2007 (aged 91–92) Uganda
- Relations: Apollo Kaggwa (grandfather)
- Parent(s): Assanasio Sentenza Kironde and Bladina Kironde
- Occupation: Lawyer, Diplomat
- Known for: First Ugandan Ambassador to the United Nations

Apollo Kironde (1915 – 21 April 2007) was a Ugandan lawyer and diplomat who served as his country's first ambassador to the United Nations.

== Background ==
He was the scion of an ancient aristocratic family of the Nsenene (grasshopper clan). His grandfather, Apollo Kaggwa, was a minister in the kingdom of Buganda when the British arrived, and served as a regent to the young Bugandan king Daudi Chwa until 1914, after which he remained Buganda's katikiro (prime minister) until 1926. For his efforts, he was knighted by Queen Victoria, becoming the first African to be knighted.

His grandson and namesake, Apollo Kironde, was the second son of his first son Assanasio Sentenza and Bladina Kironde. At an early age young Apollo showed a lot of promise and was sent abroad to school. He studied to be a teacher and after many years of teaching went to England and read law at Middle Temple. He went back to Uganda and was the first African to pass the bar there.

When the King of Buganda Mutesa II was exiled to the United Kingdom after a dispute with the colonial government, it was Apollo Kironde who went to England to win his freedom. Subsequently, he was invited to be a minister in the colonial government, a privilege formerly limited to the English. When Uganda won its independence, he was named its first ambassador to the UN.

== Personal life ==
=== Marriages and children ===
Kironde was married several times but his first prominent marriage was to Santa from the respected Bakaluba family in 1945. They had two children together:

- Kaddumukasa Kironde: A well-known newspaper food commentator in Uganda.
- Katiti Kironde: Who lives in the US and notably became a cover girl for a women's magazine.

Sadly, Santa died in childbirth in 1954. Subsequent marriages led to Kironde having a family in the United States and another in Britain. One of his later wives was Josephine Hawkins, whom he married in Newark, New Jersey, in 1966 while serving as ambassador to the UN. In total, he had approximately 16 children.

== Education ==
- King's College Budo: He completed his secondary education at this prestigious institution in Uganda.
- Makerere College (University): Kironde first studied education and sociology at Makerere College (now Makerere University), training initially as a teacher.
- University of Fort Hare: He continued his studies at the University of Fort Hare in South Africa, a notable institution where he studied alongside future South African President Nelson Mandela.
- Middle Temple, London: Kironde traveled to England to read law at, one of the four Inns of Court in London.
- University of London: He earned a law degree from the University of London.

After his time in the UK, Kironde returned to Uganda and was called to the Uganda bar in April 1953, becoming the first African to qualify and practice as a legal practitioner in the country.

== Legacy ==
Apollo Kironde died on April 21, 2007, at the age of 92. In his later years, he was known as a prominent landowner in Buganda and faced stress due to land fraud issues. His legacy is that of a pioneering diplomat and lawyer who played a significant role in Uganda's history during its transition to independence and subsequent political shifts.

== See also ==
- Ugandan Americans
- Perezi Kamunanwire
- Joshua Wanume Kibedi
- Semakula Kiwanuka
