= Bukuzindu Hybrid Solar and Thermal Power Station =

Hybrid solar and diesel fuel-fired thermal power plant

- Country: Uganda
- Location: Bugala Island, Kalangala District
- Coordinates: 00°18′25″S 32°09′09″E
- Status: Under construction
- Construction began: 2013
- Commission date: 2014 Expected
- Owner: Kalangala Infrastructure Services Limited

Solar farm
- Type: Flat-panel PV

Thermal power station
- Primary fuel: Diesel fuel

Power generation
- Nameplate capacity: 1.6 MW

Bukuzindu Hybrid Solar and Thermal Power Station is a 1.6MW hybrid solar and diesel fuel-fired thermal power plant in Uganda, the third-largest economy in the East African Community.

== Location ==
The power station is located in Bukuzindu Village, Magoye sub-county, on Bugala Island, the largest island in the Ssese Islands Archipelago, in Kalangala District, in Lake Victoria, Africa's largest fresh-water lake, in Uganda's Central Region. This location is near the town of Kalangala, where the district headquarters are located, approximately nautical 51 kilometres (32 mi), by water, southwest of the town of Entebbe, on the mainland.

== Overview ==
The hybrid power station has a 0.6 Megawatts solar energy component and a 1.0 Megawatts diesel fuel-fired thermal component. The solar component is for use primarily during the day when the sun is up, and the thermal component is for use primarily at night when the sun is down. As part of the development, electricity transmission lines will be constructed to distribute the generated energy across the urban and rural areas on Bugala Island. The cost of the Power station alone is estimated at UGX:20 billion (approximately US$7.25 million).

== Kalangala Infrastructure Services ==
In 2005, the infrastructure company called InfraCo Holdings, entered into an agreement with the Government of Uganda, to among other projects, build a power station to supply electricity to Bugala Island, the largest island in the Ssese Islands Archipelago. Kalangala Infrastructure Services (KIS), is the local subsidiary of InfraCo Holdings, that entered into a private-public-partnership arrangement with the government to implement the desired infrastructure developments.

The development projects under the KIS scheme include:

- The construction of a hybrid power station and the electrification of the entire island of Bugala.
- The building a double-hulled commercial ferry, to transport people from Bukakata to Kalangala.
- The development of a water supply system for the island.
- The upgrading of the existing 66 kilometres (41 mi), main road, to Class B gravel.

All four projects are expected to cost about US$50 million to construct.

== Project Funding ==
The entire development is a joint venture between KIS, a subsidiary of InfraCo Holdings and Uganda Development Corporation, on behalf of the Uganda Government. Funding for the US$50 million construction costs was provided by:

1. InfraCo Holdings of the UK
2. Nedbank of South Africa
3. Uganda Development Corporation
4. Emerging Africa Infrastructure Fund
5. United States Agency for International Development
6. Department for International Development of the UK
7. Guarant Company

The construction of the four components of the project were expected to be complete by December 2014. As of April 2015, the solar power station is operational with over 2,000 customers connected. Two marine vessels, the MV Pearl and MV Ssese, ply the waters between Kalangala and the mainland. The 66 kilometres (41 mi) road network on the island and the purified water distribution system are expected to come online in May 2015.

== Recent developments ==
As of November 2018, the connected customers consume an average of 0.4 megawatts of the 1.6 megawatt capacity generation. Kalangala Infrastructure Services is in the process of encouraging more customers and SMEs to connect to the power station.

== See also ==
- UG Power Stations
- Kalangala
- Bugala Island
- Kalangala District
- Central Uganda
