= Kiwumulo Cave =

Cultural site in Ssese Islands, Uganda

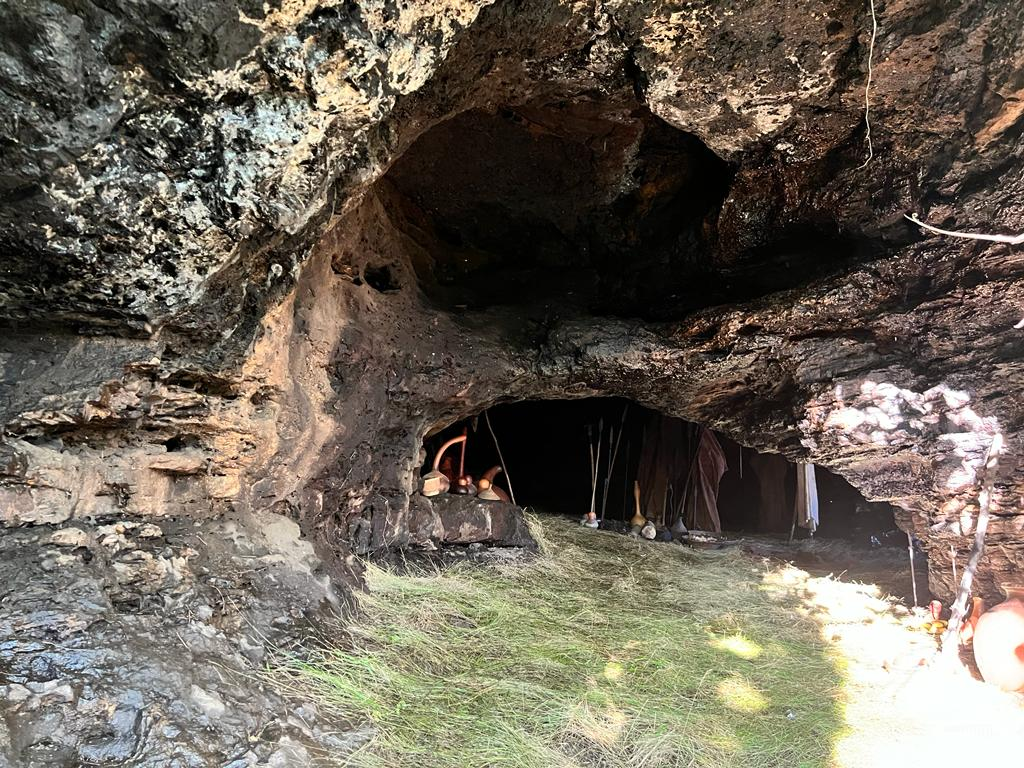
Entrance into the Kiwumulo Cave

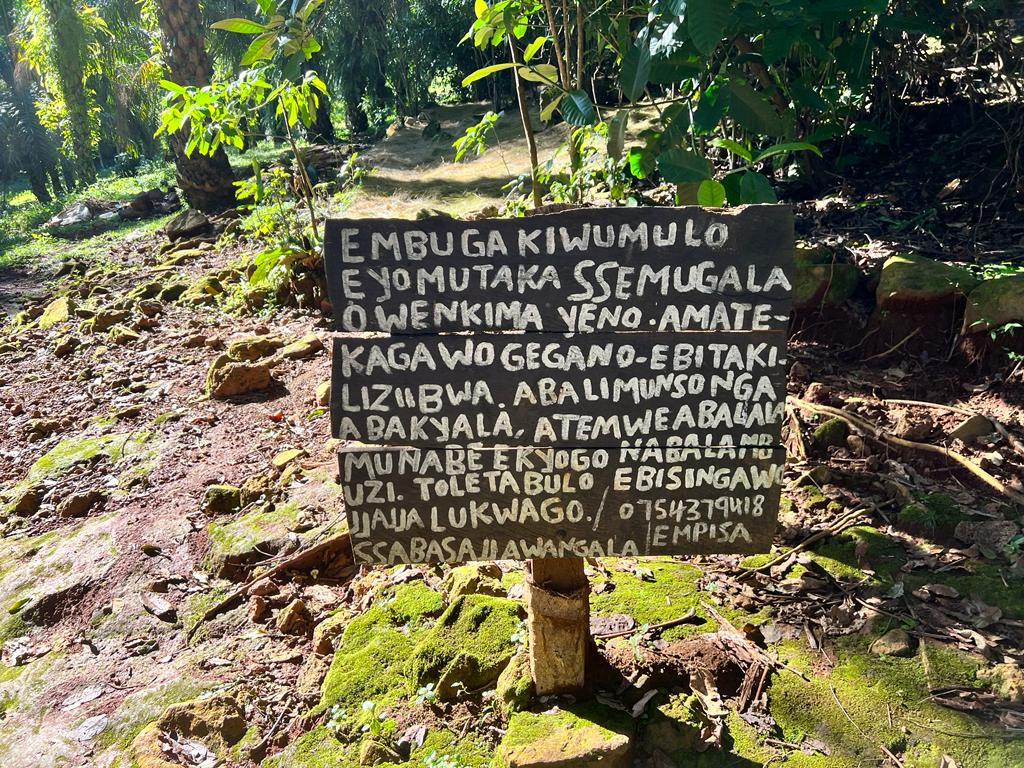
Rules and regulations for Kiwumulo Cave

Kiwumulo Cave, also known as Kalaya Cave, is a cultural site located in Ssese islands, Kalangala district, Uganda. The cave is believed to be the origin of over 50 clans of Buganda Kingdom. The Kalaya cave is owned by Jjaja Kiwumulo or Semuggala. The cave is for the Nkima (Monkey) clan, which is one of the 52 clans in Buganda.

== Background ==
The cave serves as a haven for local residents seeking relaxation, prayer, and a closer connection to God, often indulging in alcohol and tobacco. This site also functions as a traditional shrine, hosting various cultural ceremonies held by different clans. It is believed that the cave serves as the final resting place for ancestral spirits. It is also believed to be a healing place and the cave has two openings with the smaller one as an exit and the big one as an entrance into the caves.

== Artifacts ==
The cave houses a collection of traditional items like spears, calabashes, and bark cloth. The cave keeps the fire alive inside both during the day and night.

== Gallery ==
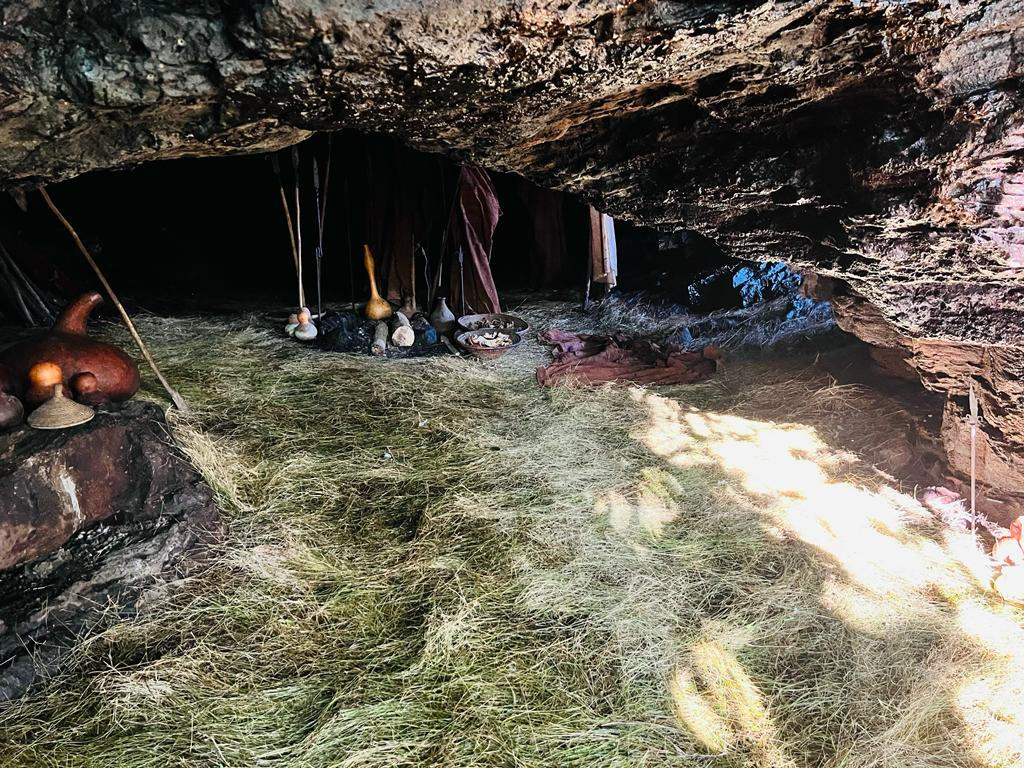
Entrance into the Kiwumulo Cave 1

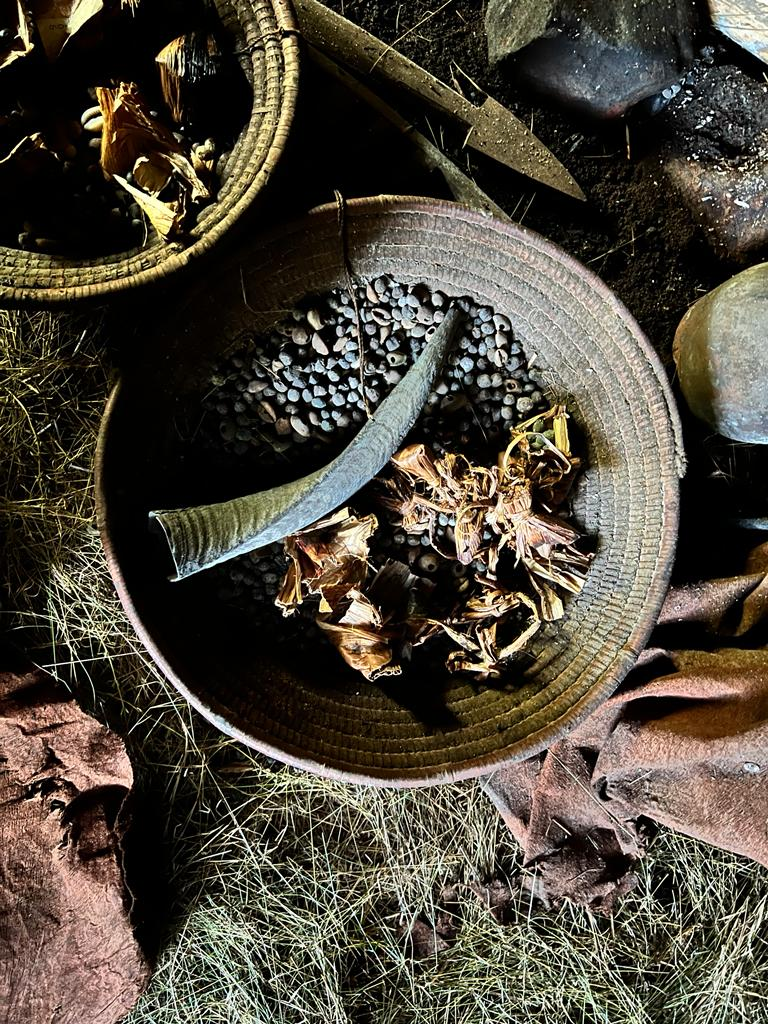
Coffee at Kiwumulo Cave

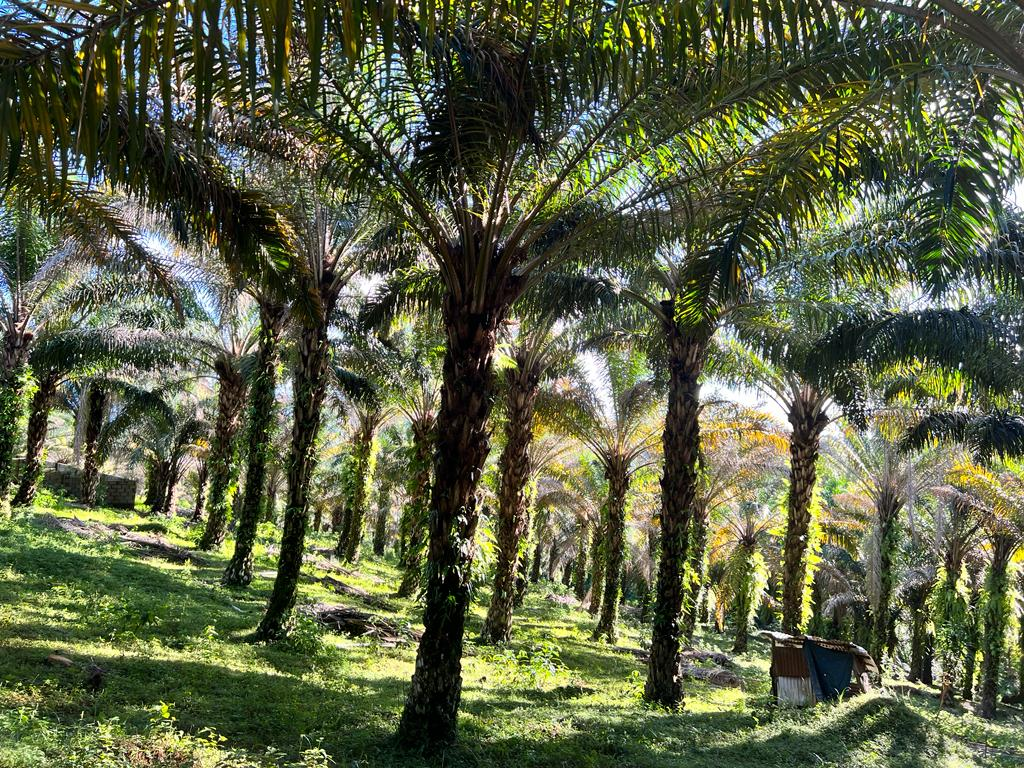
Palm trees plantation surrounding Kiwumulo Cave

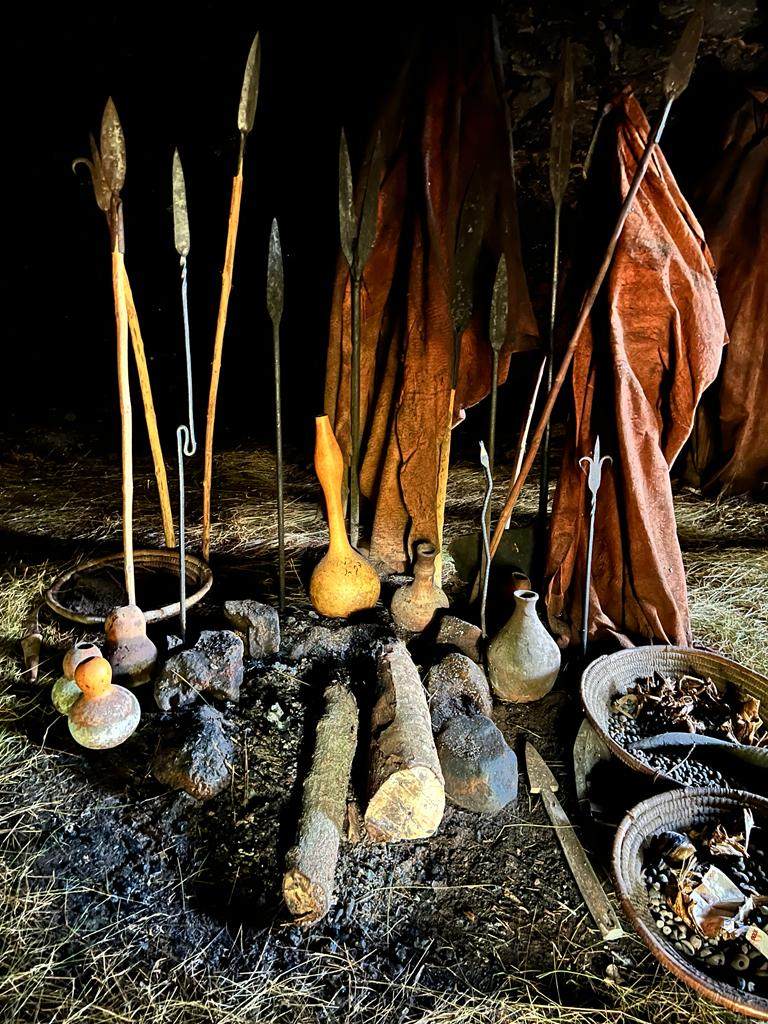
Spears, calabashes, and bark cloth at Kiwumulo Cave

== See also ==
- Masaka District
- Lutoboka Central Forest Reserve
