= Fishing gear and methods used in Uganda =

Fishing gear and methods used in Uganda are both modern and traditional. Fish in Uganda are caught mostly with plank canoes and to a lesser extent, fiberglass boats. Some dugout canoes are also still being used. The plank canoes are generally 4–12 m (13.12–39.37 ft) in length and dugout canoes average 3.5 m (11.48 ft). The total number of vessels is about 17,000 and about 20% of these are motorized. Artisanal fishermen use various gear including gillnets, seines and hook and line. In a number of localities, traditional methods including baskets, traps and mosquito nets continue to be used. The gear commonly used includes gillnets, lift nets, scoop-nets used in light fishing; hook and line gear (hand-lines, fishing rods or tackles) and fish traps.

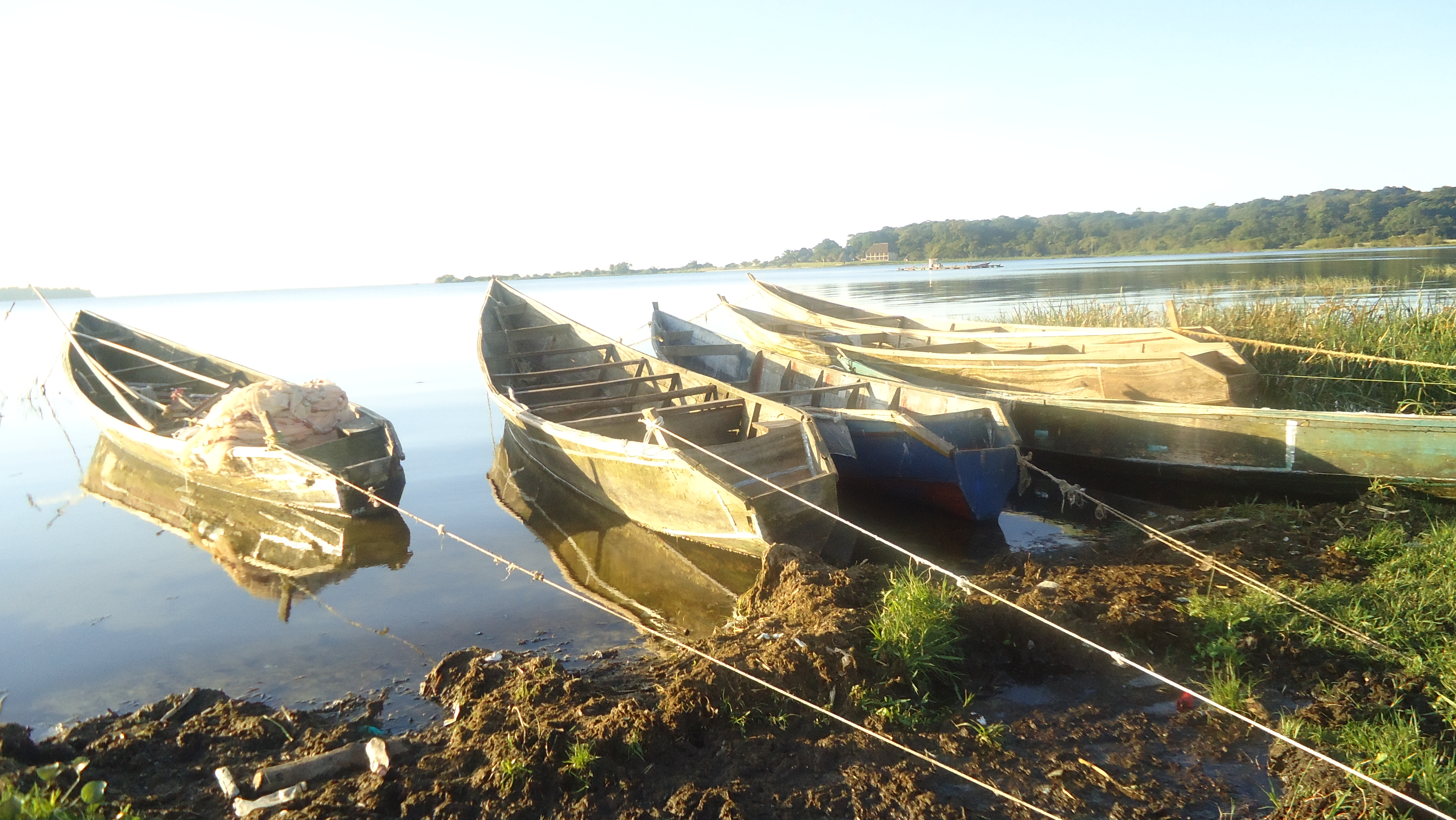
Boats at Lutoboka landing site

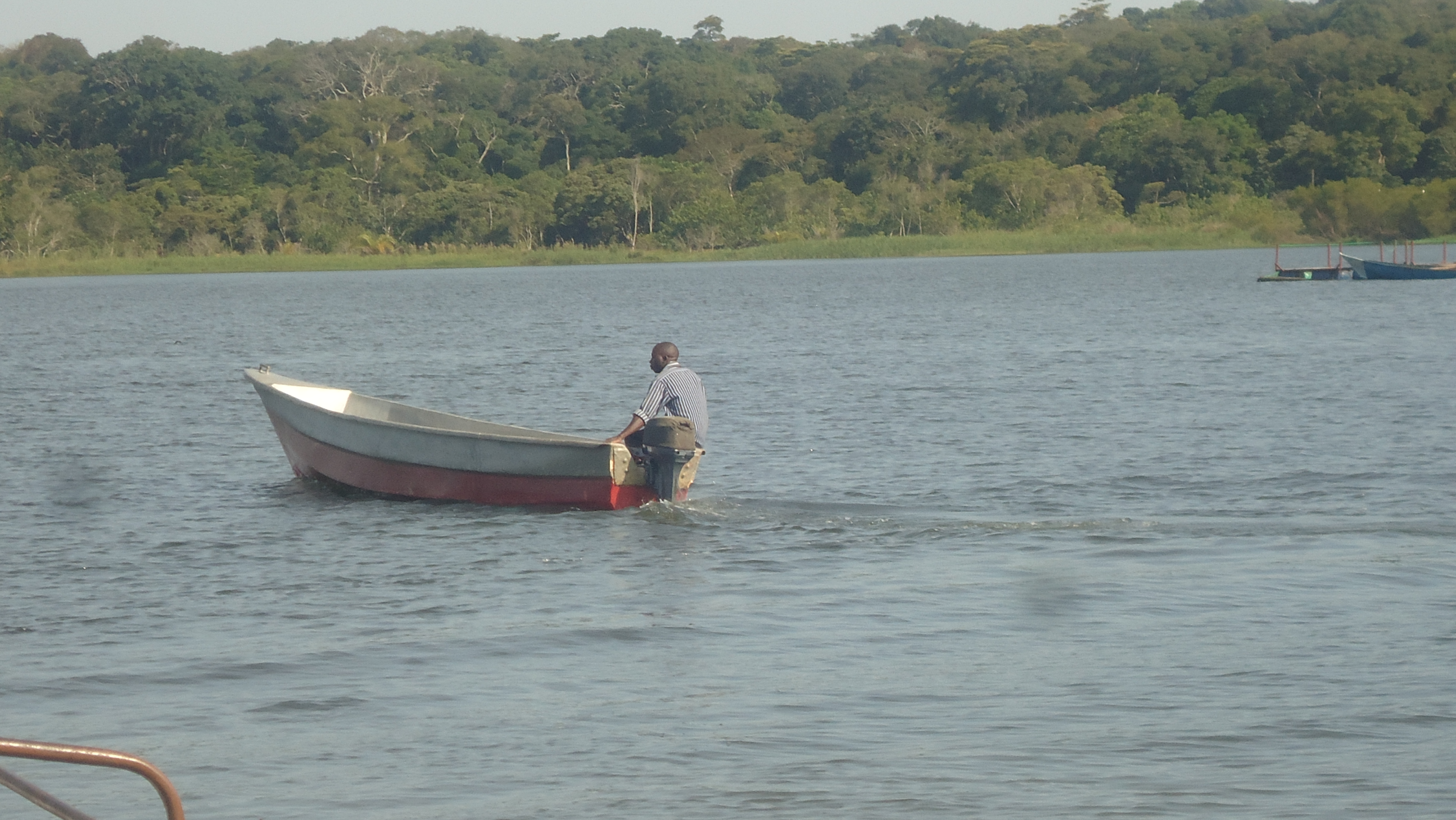
A motor boat in Kalangala

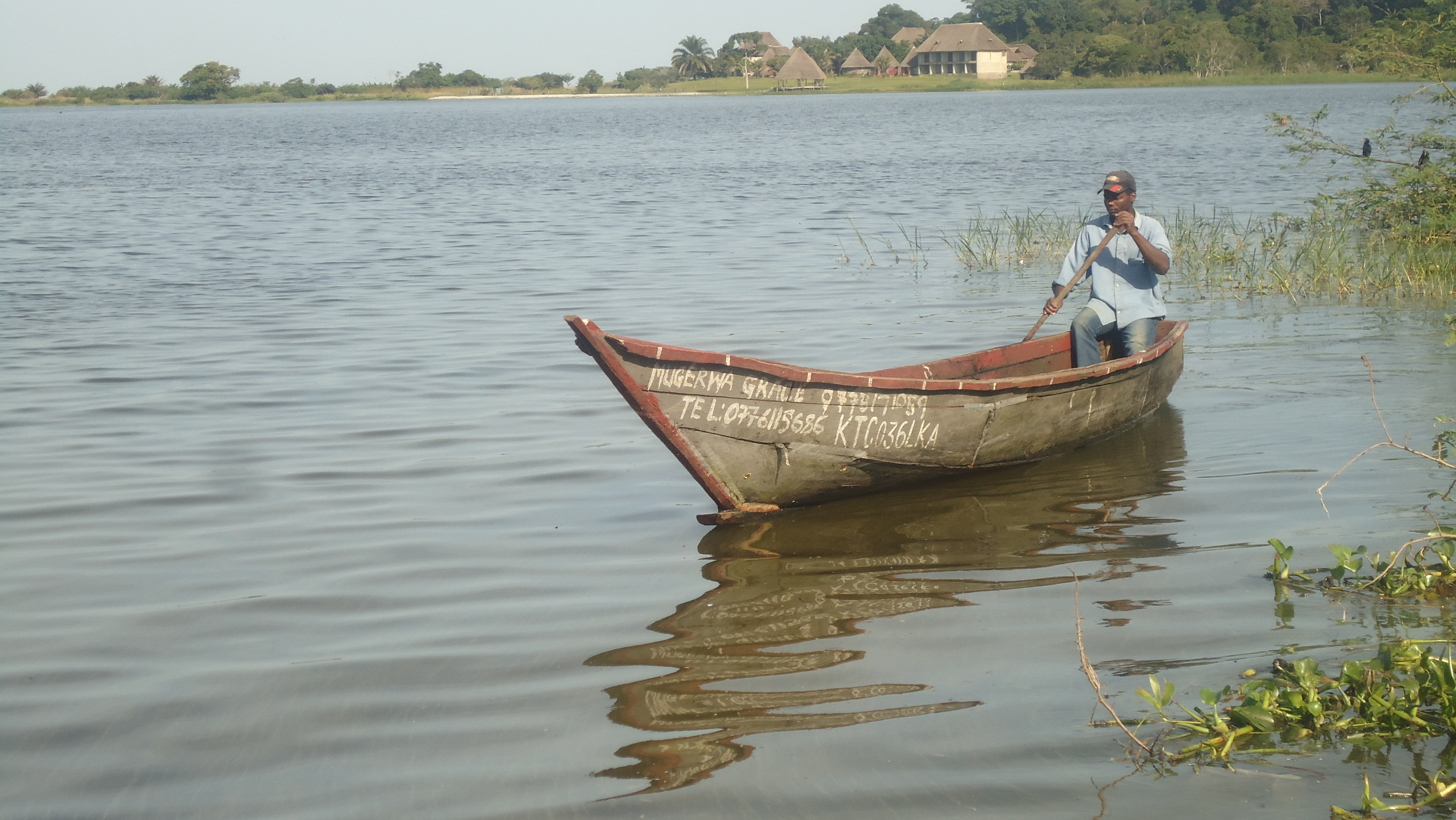
A fisherman in a boat in Kalangala

== Gillnet ==
Gillnets are currently a major and popular fishing gear widely used for fish capture in the major and minor water bodies. They are normally set at dusk and hauled in at dawn. Drift gillnetting is commonly used on Lake Albert, but rarely on other water bodies. The target fish species for the gillnet fishery are Nile perch, tilapia, Bagrus, Clarias, Protopterus, Alestes, Hydrocynus and many other demersal fish.

Fish nets have different sizes. The small sized nets are used for small fish while the big sized nets are used for large fish. For instance: 0.5–1 in (1.27–2.54 cm) grade nets are used for fishing nkejje, 1–6 in (2.54–15.24 cm) grade for fishing tilapia, and above 6 in (15.24 cm) for Nile perch. The fishermen use boats to haul the nets. The bigger the boat, the larger the volume of fish. One net can weigh up to 10 kg (22.05 lb), without fish. A small boat may not be able to handle such a load.

== Longline ==
The longline method developed in the 1980s for the effective exploitation of predatory fish e.g. Lates niloticus, Protopterus, Clarias, Bagrus, etc. A typical gear comprises a long length of a mainline 100–300 m (328.08–984.25 ft), rigged with monofilament twine (diameter 1.00-2.00 mm) or multifilament twine (ply 36–60) and bears short snoods 0.3–0.8 m (0.98–2.62 ft) carrying baited fishhooks. A longline is prepared for setting in the morning or afternoon by a crew or hired men (1-2). Hooks are baited with natural baits (e.g. small live fish, slices of meat, earthworms and insects). The gear is set late in the afternoon in a predetermined fishing ground and left to fish passively overnight. Hauling is normally done early next morning the quality of fish harvested by this method is usually good.

== Angling gear ==
Handline (the simplest and cheapest gear) is manually operated by one person along the lake beaches or on riverbanks. Effective angling is done in calm waters early in the morning or evening or on dark nights. A set of handlines can also be operated as trolling gear. This is a prospective commercial fishery on Lake Victoria, Lake Kyoga, and Lake Albert, targeting predacious species like Nile perch and Hydrocynus. Fishing rod or tackle is mechanically operated by one man using a reel fixed on a springy plastic rod. Its mainline is baited with a fish lure. Angling for Lates niloticus on Lake Victoria or for trout on River Sipi in Kapchorwa District is a lucrative activity particularly for the foreign tourists who adopt this fishing method. This method may use live bait and the catching of bait (immature fish) using small mesh-sized gillnets; seine-nets and fish-trap can be detrimental to the fishery.

== Fish-traps, baskets and weirs ==
Various designs of fish traps, baskets and weirs are used in fishery. Conical traps are used most commonly for catching fish species such as Clarias, Barbus, Schilbe in marshy shallow waters of lakes, rivers and in permanent and seasonal swamps. These are particularly used on River Nile, Lake Kyoga, swamps and other minor lakes. The gear is strategically set as a barrier and fish voluntarily or involuntarily enter it, but their escape is hindered by a special non-return valve or device. Traps set in the river estuaries and papyrus fringes indiscriminately trap fish (Barbus, Alestes, Clarias, Hydrocyrus, Protopterus, Labeo) of all sizes and ages.

== Fishing gear for the Rastrineobola argentea (silver fish) fishery ==
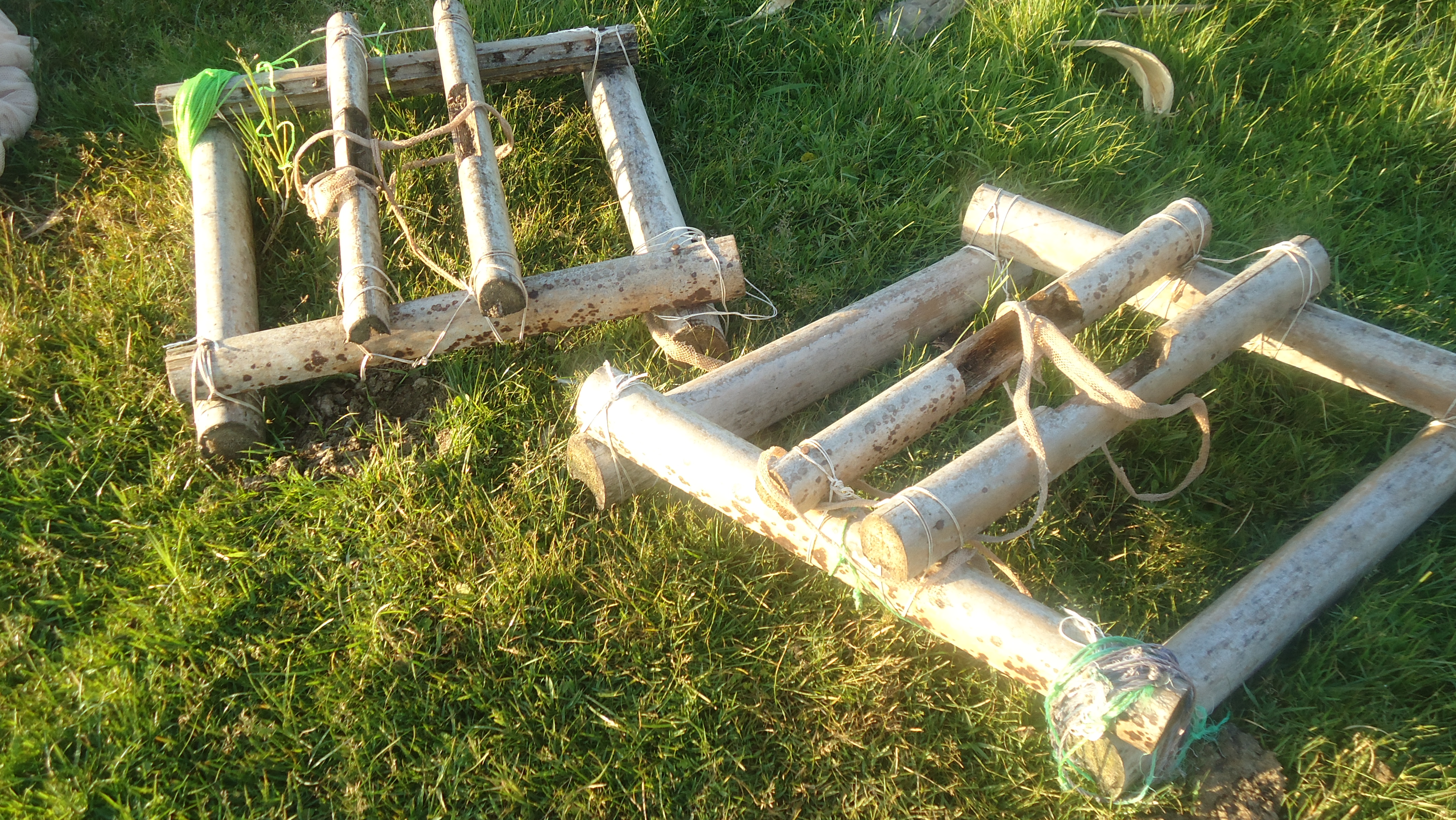
Steamer Lamp stand known as Kengere in Kalangala

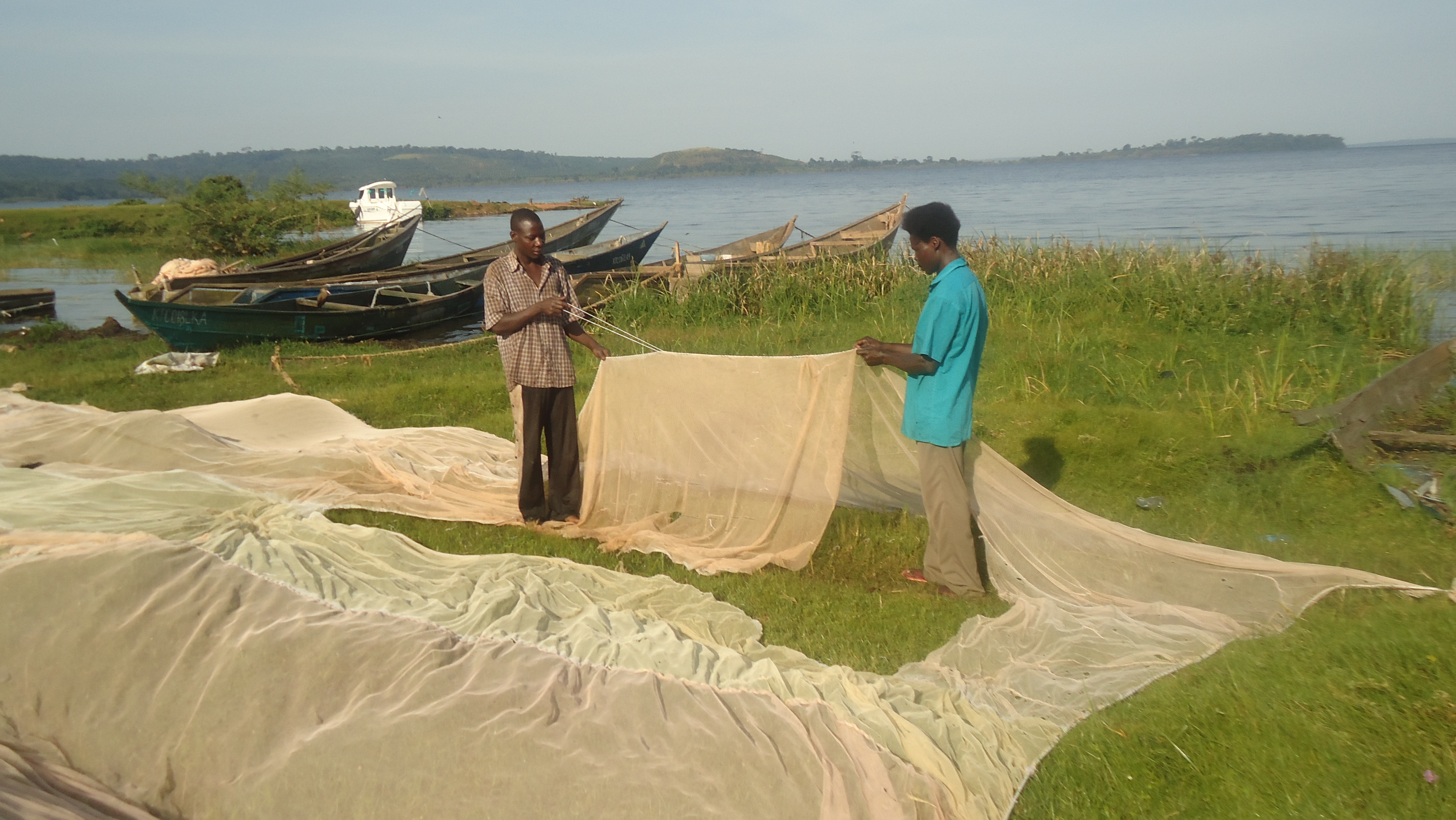
Fishermen repairing nets for silver fish on Lutoboka landing site kalangala

Silver fish is fished at night when there is no moon. The fishermen leave at 5:00pm and return at 6:00am or 7:00am. Parafin Steamer lamps placed on rafts called "Lago" are used to trap the fish. A fish net ranging from 5-10mm is used. It is often 40 ft (12.19 m) long with eight to fourteen sections, called "golofa". The fishermen use six lamps when using such a net. This a change from the practice long ago when the fisherman used one lamp and a much smaller net called "Kyota". The fishermen nicknamed the fishing of silverfish in the middle of the lake, Hurr up. But silverfish is also fished on the shore in Buvuma district. This is mostly done by Women. The net they use has six sections. This kind of silverfish is called, silverfish of the shore, Mukene owokutaka.

Lamps are attached to the front of a canoe and others on small rafts. These rafts keep the lamps floating. The net is lowered into the water. A big school of fish is attracted to the light and trapped in the net. In another instance, lamps are set in a straight line (about 200 m (656.17 ft) long) by connecting the rafts with ropes (at intervals of about 15 m (49.21 ft)) and positioning them perpendicular to the shoreline. A fish school is attracted by light and eventually concentrated around the light. The lights are hauled in slowly until they are grouped together close to the shore. One lamp is attached to the canoe so that the lamps on the rafts can be placed in the canoe before scooping without losing the catch.

In some areas, a pair of canoes joined together by planks forming "a catamaran" is used to fish silverfish. A kerosene paraffin lamp, attached to the middle of one of the planks, is lit. Another lamp mounted on a small raft connected to the canoe by a rope of about 15 m (49.21 ft) long, is also lit and slowly pulled towards the canoe. This attracts the fish to the net. The fish are trapped in the net and the lights extinguished.

== Fishery by perforated plastic basins ==
Perforated basins are extensively used mainly for Alestes nurse fishery on Lake Albert. This is an emerging fishery on this lake. These basins are operated at daytime in shallow, calm waters. Bait in form of dregs of native beer or cassava flour is splattered in water above immersed basins; fish is attracted to feed on bait and is scooped out.

== Hooks ==
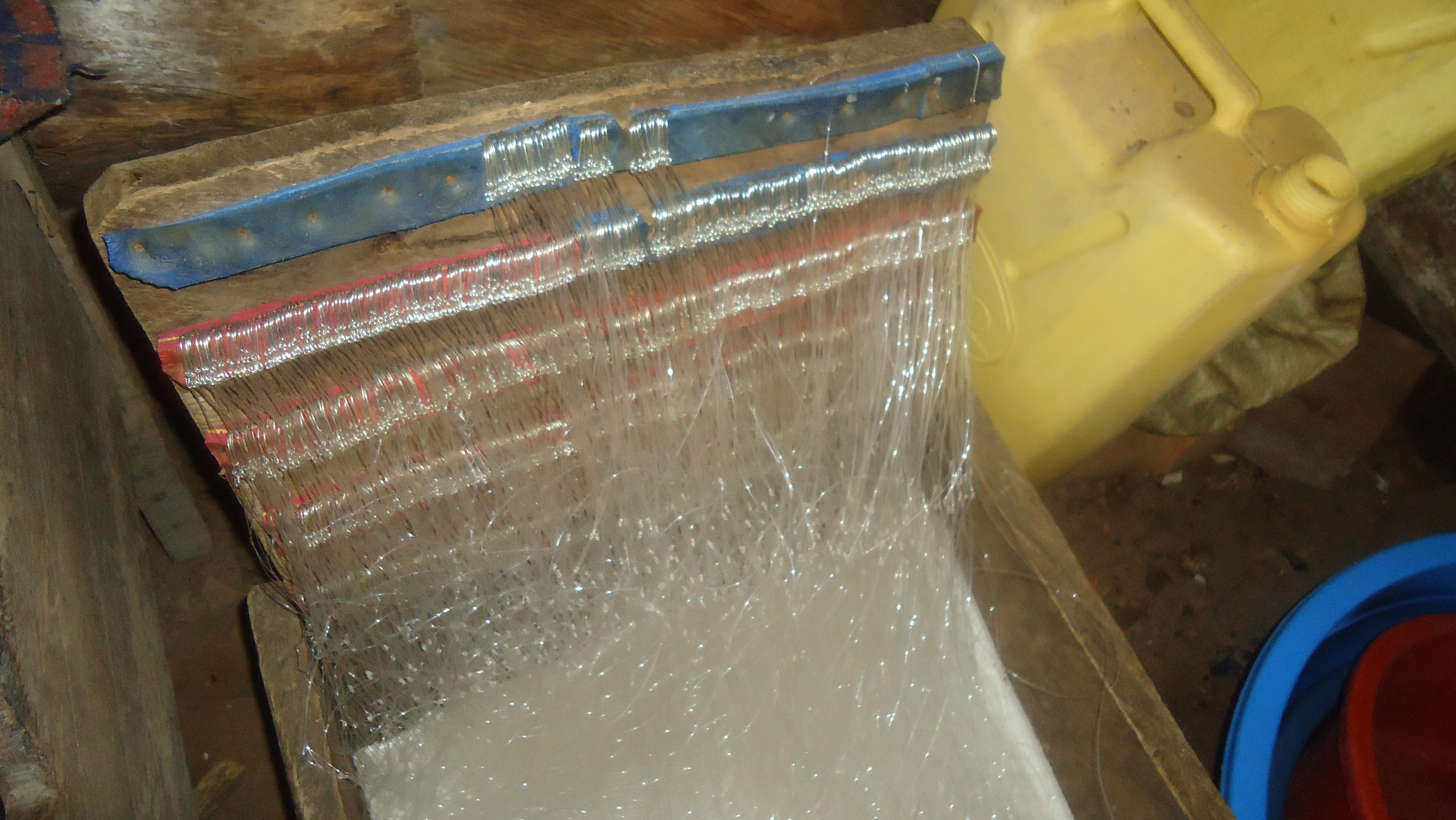
Chest of fish hooks for fishing nile perch in Kalangala

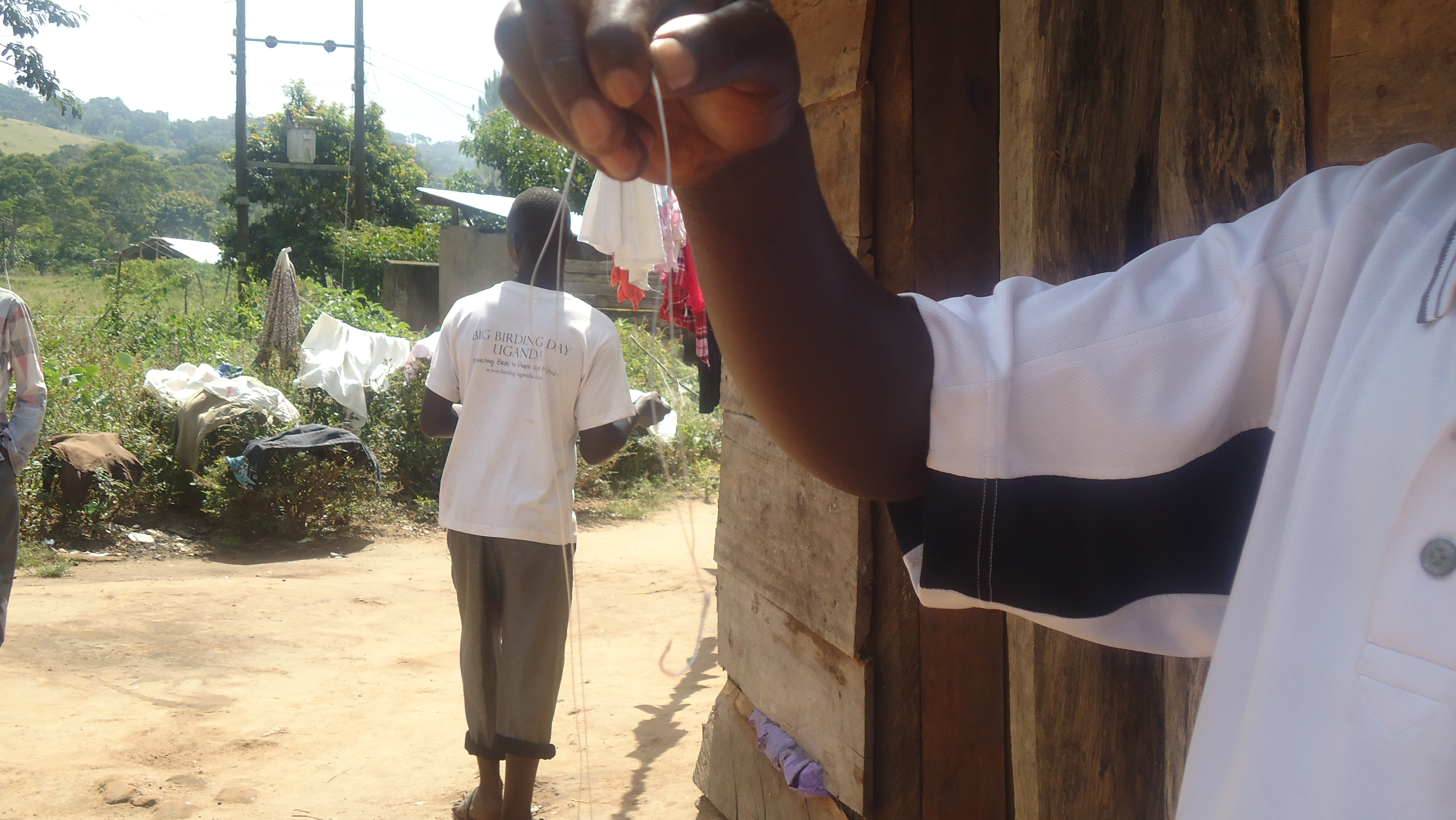
A fisherman holding a hook for fishing Nile perch in Kalangala

Hooks are used for fishing but on a small scale. The size of the hook used depends on the type of fish. Hooks have numbers. The lower the number, the bigger the hook. Hooks used for tilapia are from numbers eleven to sixteen. Those for nile perch are from seven to 10. Lung fish are fished with hooks of numbers six and five. Bigger hooks are used for bigger fish so that they do not break free and swim away.

On Lutoboka landing site on Bugala Island in Kalangala District, fishermen se hooks of number 12 to fish nile perch. 1000 hooks are put in water. Sprat is put on the hook as bait. The hooks are put 5 m (16.40 ft) apart. Not all of them get fish. Some times the fishermen get 10 to twenty fish of different sizes. The hooks are kept in a wooden chest.
