= Koome Island =

Island in Uganda

Coordinates: 00°05′06″S 32°45′00″E

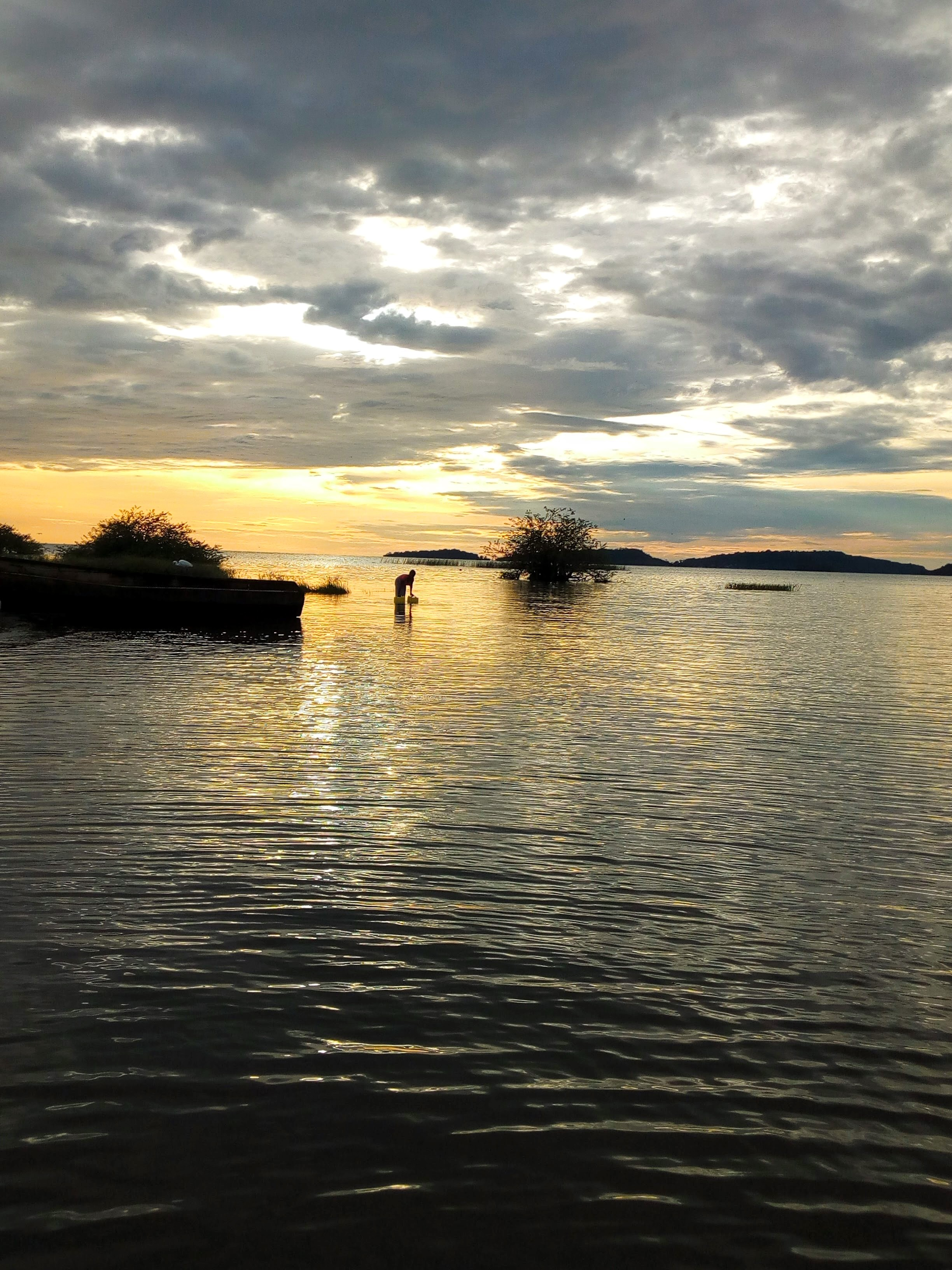
Sunrise on Koome

Koome is an island in Lake Victoria, Uganda.

== Location ==
Part of the Ssese Islands archipelago, Koome Island is located in Mukono District, in northwestern Lake Victoria, in Uganda. The island is separated from the Bugala group of Ssese Islands by the Koome Channel. Koome is the largest island in the northeastern group. Other islands in the same group include: Damba Island, Lwaje Island, Ngamba-Chimpanzee Island, Bulago Island, Kayaga Island and others. This location lies approximately 63 kilometres (39 mi), by water, northeast of Kalangala. Koome also lies approximately 35 kilometres (22 mi), by water, southeast of Entebbe, the nearest large town. The coordinates of Koome Island are:00 05 06S, 32 45 00E (Latitude:-0.0850; Longitude:32.7500).

== Urban areas ==
The largest urban area on the island is called Bugombe, located on the northwestern shore of the island. There is a health center on the island, Koome Health Center III, not far from Bugombe. In February 2011, PostBank Uganda announced that they will soon open a brick and mortar branch on Koome Island.

== Economic activities ==
The principal economic activity on Koome, as is the case with most adjacent islands in the Ssese Islands is fishing. Nile Perch is the species primarily fished, with most of the catch processed on the mainland for export. Overfishing is a concern. Other economic activities include agriculture, both crop and animal husbandry, logging and tourism.

== See also ==
- Ssese Islands
- Kalangala District
- Lake Victoria
- Central Region, Uganda
