= Kako Senior Secondary School =

Location
- Masaka, Masaka District; Uganda
- Coordinates: 0°18′19″S 31°48′26″E

Information
- Type: Public Middle School and High School (8–13)
- Motto: "Education Is My Birth Right"
- Established: 1963
- Headteacher: Jack Ssengendo
- Website: Homepage

Kako Senior Secondary School is a government aided, mixed boarding middle and high school (grades 8–13) in Uganda.

== Location ==
The school campus is situated on Kako Hill, approximately 13 kilometres (8.1 mi) by road east of Masaka, off the road to Bukakata. Kako is situated on the northeastern shores of Lake Victoria, the second-largest freshwater lake in the world. The campus lies approximately 136 kilometres (85 mi) southwest of Kampala, the capital and largest city of Uganda. The coordinates of Kako Senior Secondary School are: 0°18'19.0"S, 31°48'26.0"E (Latitude: -0.305278; Longitude: 31.807222).

== History ==
The school was founded in 1963 by several individuals in the Anglican Church in what was then the West Buganda Diocese. These included the following:

- Timeseo Kiswa
- Mesusera Kayongo
- Canon Erisa Wamala
- Mesusera Musoke
- Canon Yokana Mukasa
- Asanasiyo Kamya
- Zefania Kiganda

The late Tomasi Ssemukasa, at the time the sub-county chief of Mukungwe subcounty, donated land to which others and the Anglican Church added to accommodate the current school campus. The first headmaster was Mesusera Kayongo, one of the founders.

== Academics ==
Kako Senior Secondary School teaches the subjects commonly taught at O-Level and A-Level. In addition, the school teaches practical vocational subjects including computer science, metalworking, woodworking, carpentry, and nutrition. At the A-Level, both art and science are offered.

== Prominent alumni ==
The following prominent people attended Kako Senior Secondary School:

1. Salim Saleh - High-ranking Military Officer in the UPDF. Formerly, Uganda's Minister of State for Microfinance. Senior Adviser to the President of Uganda on military matters.
2. Davis Kamoga - Bronze Medal winner in 400 meters at the 1996 Summer Olympics in Atlanta, Georgia
3. Captain Frank Musisi - Commanding Officer for Headquarters & Headquarters Company, 377th Theater Sustainment Command, United States Army, New Orleans, Louisiana.

== See also ==
- Education in Uganda
- Masaka District
