= Lutoboka Central Forest Reserve =

Forest in Uganda

- Lutoboka Forest
- IUCN category III (natural monument or feature)
- Location within Uganda
- Location: Eastern Region, Uganda
- Nearest city: Kalangala
- Coordinates: 0°18′21.78″S 32°17′45.348″E
- Area: 174 ha (430 acres)
- Established: 1930
- Governing body: National Forestry Authority

Lutoboka Central Forest Reserve is a protected area in Uganda's Eastern district of Kalangala. The 174 hectares (430 acres) Lutoboka Forest Reserve is located in Kalangala Town Council on Bugala Island.

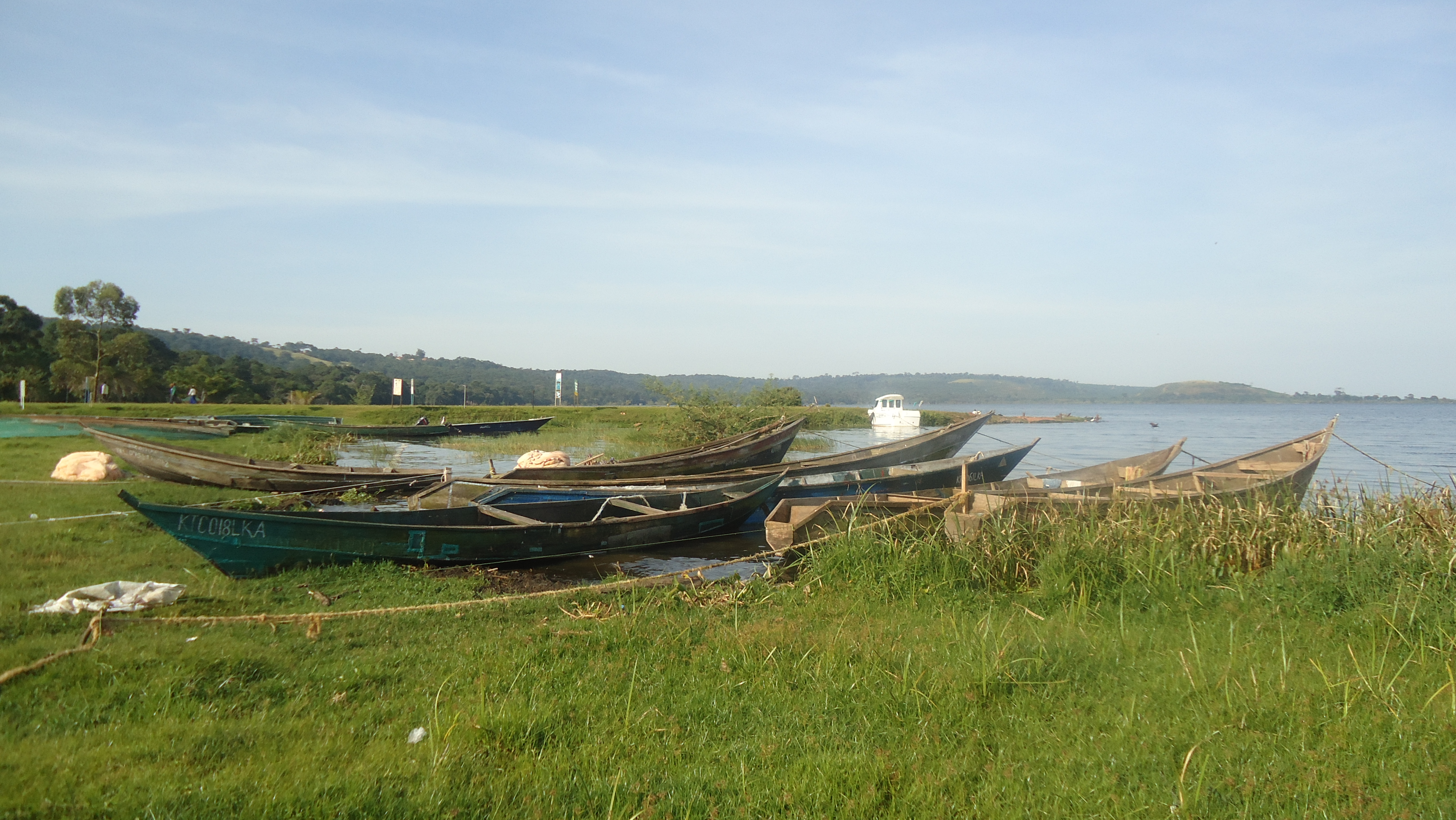
View of the Lutoboka Forest taken from the Lutoboka landing site

== Setting and geography ==
The forest reserve is located on Uganda's Ssese Islands and is home to a variety of plant and animal life, including trees, shrubs, herbs, birds, butterflies, and monkeys. Lutoboka forest reserve is also a popular tourist destination, offering visitors the opportunity to go for forest walks, bird watching, and primate viewing.

The Lutoboka Forest Reserve is a moist evergreen forest at a medium elevation that is characterized by Piptadeniastrum and Uapaca species. The most important habitat for breeding birds is a narrow strip of tall trees at the edge of the forest, mostly within the Forest Reserve but with small excursions into Kalangala town, the islands' largest urban center. The perimeter of the Forest Reserve is grassland that extends up towards the town.

There are also a number of hotels and lodges located near the forest reserve, which offer accommodation and dining facilities. Private developers control a large portion of the accommodation in Lutoboka.

The forest is managed by the National Forestry Authority (NFA), which is responsible for its conservation and sustainable management. The NFA has a number of programs in place to protect the forest, including tree planting, anti-poaching patrols, and community outreach programs.

== History ==
Lutoboka Forest Reserve was gazetted in 1930, in order to protect the area's natural resources. The forest has been under threat from a number of factors, including deforestation, agricultural expansion, and human encroachment, although the NFA has been successful in protecting the forest, and it remains an important part of the Ssese Islands ecosystem.

== Biodiversity ==
The Ssese Islands rely heavily on the Lutoboka Forest Reserve for water. The trees in the forest help to control the water cycle and provide habitat for a variety of plant and animal species. The woodland is also a famous tourist destination that helps the local economy. The Lutoboka woodland reserve is essential for Phalacrocorax carbo breeding, with 5,000 pairs (nests). Other prominent species are Ploceus weynsi and Ploceus castanops (both from the Lake Victoria Basin habitat). Three butterflies are also endemic: Acraea simulata, Thermoniphas togara bugalla, and Acraea epaea.

There is increasing forest reserve degradation in Kalangala including in Lutoboka central forest reserve. The forest reserve has been affected by increased human activities not limited to agriculture and expansion of the urban area in Kalangala district. In 2020, the district chairperson called for the cutting down of Lutoboka forest reserve to expand and develop the town. The degradation is made worse by increase illegal tree logging by encroachers. Creating infrastructure for long-term management is one strategy to ensure the survival of significant conservation sites. Community-based conservation is vital for major biodiversity locations including Lutoboka forest reserve.

== See also ==
- Bukaleba Central Forest Reserve
- Kagombe Central Forest Reserve
