= Bugala Thermal Power Station =

Building in Uganda

Bugala Power Station
- Country: Uganda
- Location: Bugala Island, Kalangala District
- Coordinates: 00°19′38″S 32°18′34″E
- Status: Operational
- Construction began: 2009
- Commission date: 2010
- Owners: Bidco Oil Refineries Limited & Wilmar International

Thermal power station
- Primary fuel: Biodiesel

Power generation
- Nameplate capacity: 1.5 megawatts (2,000 hp)

Bugala Power Station is a 1.5 megawatts (2,000 hp) biodiesel-fired thermal power plant located on Bugala Island, in Kalangala District, in the Ssese Islands Archipelago, on Lake Victoria, in south-central Uganda.

== Location ==
The power station is located on Bugala Island, the largest island in the Ssese Islands Archipelago, in Kalangala District, in Lake Victoria, Africa's largest fresh-water lake, in Uganda's Central Region. This location is near the town of Kalangala, where the district headquarters are located, approximately nautical 48 kilometres (30 mi), by water, southwest of the town of Entebbe, on the mainland.

== Overview ==
Bugala Power Station is integrated in design and construction with the palm oil processing plant owned by Bidco Oil Refineries Limited. Bidco owns a 6,500 hectares (16,000 acres) palm oil plantation on Bugala Island, where the power station is located. The oil processing factory crushes the palm oil fruits into crude palm oil. The residue is burned, generating heat, which is used to boil water, creating steam. The steam is used to turn turbines and create electricity in the process. The electricity is used within the factory and any excess is sold to the neighboring town of Kalangala. Power is also generated by burning fibers from the tree trunks, known as bagasse.

Construction of the power station was completed and commissioned in March 2010. The power plant and oil processing factory is a joint effort between the Ugandan Government, the International Fund for Agricultural Development (IFAD), the World Bank and Oil Palm Uganda. Oil Palm Uganda is a consortium between Wilmar International, a conglomerate that specializes in the development of agricultural plantations and Bidco Oil Refineries Limited, an oil processing company.

== Uganda Palm Oil Project ==
Bugala Power Station is a byproduct of the Uganda Palm Oil project. The project was co-funded by Oil Palm Uganda which provided US$120 million, while IFAD provided a loan of US$19.9 million. The Government of Uganda contributed US$12 million for land, electricity and roads. Local farmers contributed US$3.16 million through labor, equity and land. The power station and oil processing factory cost US$10 million to construct. Bidco already maintains a palm oil refinery in Uganda, located in Jinja, Uganda's second industrial city. As of July 2011, the acreage under palm trees by out-growers, had grown to over 2,080 hectares (5,100 acres). The target of 4,000 hectares (9,900 acres), under palm trees by outgrowers is expected to be attained in a few more years. By 2014, the size of the palm oil plantation had grown to 20,000 acres (8,100 ha), with plans to expand to 30,000 acres (12,000 ha).

== Shareholding ==
The investment profile of the Uganda Palm Oil Project is summarized in the table below:

Uganda Palm Oil Project
Rank	Name of Investor	Contribution US$ (Millions)	Shareholding (%)
1	Oil Palm Uganda	120.00	77.39
2	IFAD	19.90	12.83
3	Government of Uganda	12.00	7.74
4	Local Out-growers	3.16	2.04
	TOTAL	155.06	100.00

== See also ==
- List of power stations in Uganda
- Kalangala
- Bugala Island
- Kalangala District
- Central Region, Uganda
