= Luggo Cultural Forest =

Historical site and tourism centre in Kalangala, Uganda

Location of Kalangala district in Uganda

Luggo Forest also known as Luggo Cultural Forest is an heritage site and tourism Centre and home to many tree species in the Bujumba subcounty of Uganda's Kalangala district. It is a private forest found in Buswa Village along Kalangala -Mulabana Road surrounded by oil palm plantations. It is the only forest containing the tree where the mace (Ddamula) symbolizing the authority of the Katikkiro is cut from. The mace commonly known as "Ddamula" was handed over by the Kabaka to the Katikkiro symbolizing the transfer of authority to the Katikkiro to rule over Buganda on his behalf.

The forest is a source of revenue to the district with 15% given to the owner of the forest.

== Controversy ==
The forest is losing the natural tree cover with only five mature trees left in the forest because of too much tree cutting for charcoal, firewood, and timber. Many indigenous trees gave been cut off for timber and charcoal with half of the forest sold off to oil palm growers. Only eight acres of the forest have been reserved and the rest of it has been given to the oil palm growers. However, plans are underway to restore the forest.

== See also ==
- Forestry in Uganda
- Kalangala District
- Bugala Thermal Power Station
- Lutoboka Central Forest Reserve
- Buganda Kingdom
- Katikkiro of Buganda
