= Damba Island =

Island in Lake Victoria

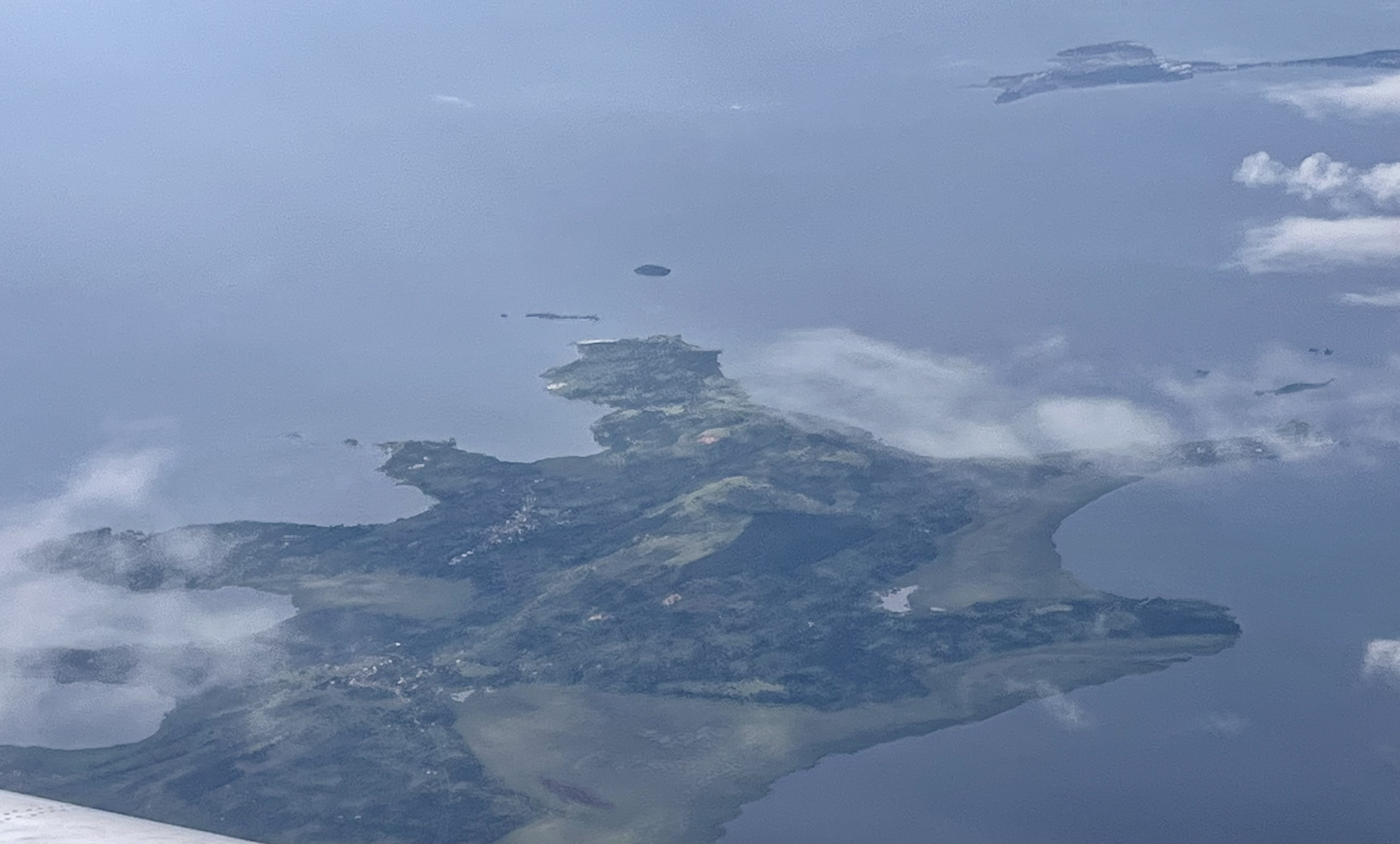

- Location within Uganda

Geography
- Location: Lake Victoria, Uganda
- Coordinates: 0.00000°N 32.78944°E
- Archipelago: Koome group
- Total islands: 1
- Length: 40 km (25 mi)
- Highest elevation: 1,171 m (3842 ft)

Administration
- Uganda
- Region: Central Region
- District: Mukono District

Additional information
- Time zone: EAT (UTC+3)

Damba Island is an island near the northern shore of Lake Victoria. It is part of the Mukono District of Uganda. The island is about 40 kilometres long and belongs to the Koome group of islands in the Ssese Islands archipelago.

== See also ==
- Bubembe Island
- Buvuma Island
