= Acraea simulata =

Scientific classification
- Kingdom: Animalia
- Phylum: Arthropoda
- Class: Insecta
- Order: Lepidoptera
- Family: Nymphalidae
- Genus: Acraea
- Species: A. simulata

Binomial name
- Acraea simulata Le Doux, 1923

Synonyms
- Acraea (Actinote) simulata; Bematistes simulata

Butterfly in the family Nymphalidae from Uganda

Acraea simulata is a butterfly in the family Nymphalidae. It is found in Uganda, where it seems to be endemic to the Ssese Islands in Lake Victoria.

== Taxonomy ==
It is a member of the Acraea masamba species group - but see also Pierre & Bernaud, 2014
