= MV Ssese =

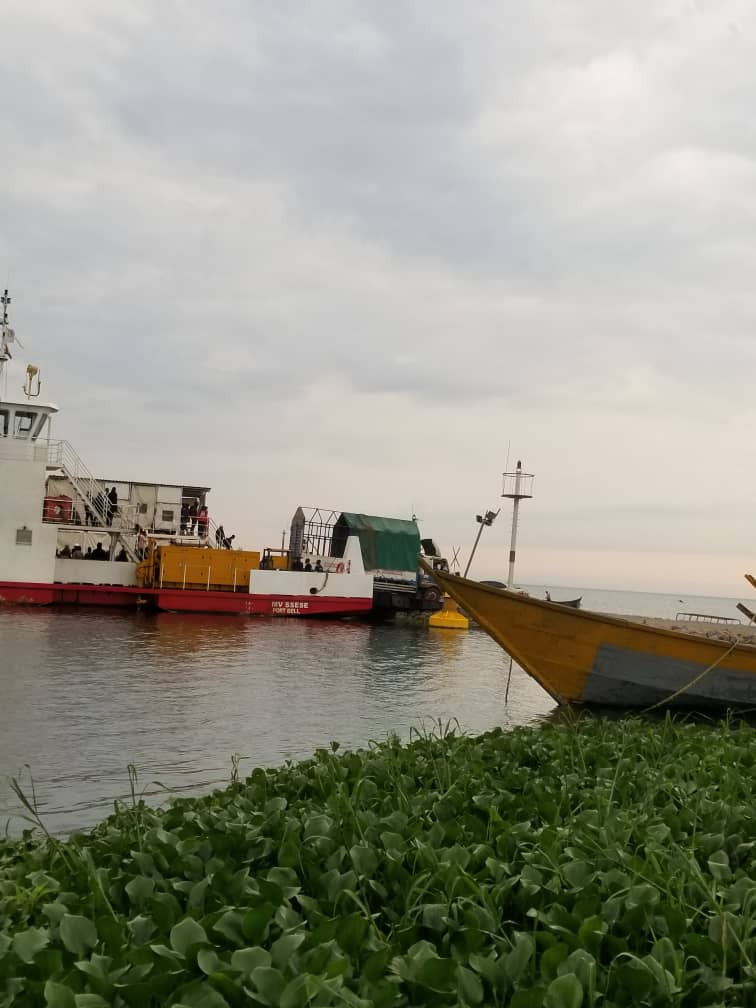
MV Ssese Portbell at Bukakata Port on 14 July 2024

MV Ssese is one of the two ferries transporting people and merchandise on Lake Victoria in Uganda via the Bukakata - Luku route in Masaka and Kalangala districts respectively. Ssese started sailing on 26 February 2015. Contrary to the traditional boats, this ferry has the capacity to transport cars and heavy equipment such as fuel tankers and tractors. Ssese has a twin vessel known as Pearl and together they voyage the waters of Lake Victoria usually in opposite directions and are both managed by Kalangala Infrustructure Services Limited (KIS), on behalf of UNRA and the government of Uganda.

== Operations ==
Ssese operates daily scheduled routes between Luku and Bukakata inland ports and according to the 2023 Ferry timetable accessed on the official website of Limited (KIS), the Ssese carries out eight routes or crossings from Luku (usually referred to as Bugoma) port and Bukakata Port and vice versa on weekly days (Monday - Saturday). The routes usually take between 30 and 45 minutes to cross from one end to the other. One of the trips is usually scheduled for transporting dangerous cargo such as charcoal and petroleum and passengers are not allowed on this dedicated trip. On Sunday, the ferry makes fewer routes and does not transport dangerous cargo. Voyage on the Ssese is free of change for passengers and vehicles to use the vessel.
