= Bukakata =

- Map of Uganda showing the location of Bukakata
- Coordinates: 00°18′18″S 32°02′24″E
- Country: Uganda
- Region: Central Uganda
- District: Masaka District
- Elevation: 1,180 m (3,870 ft)
- Time zone: UTC+3 (EAT)

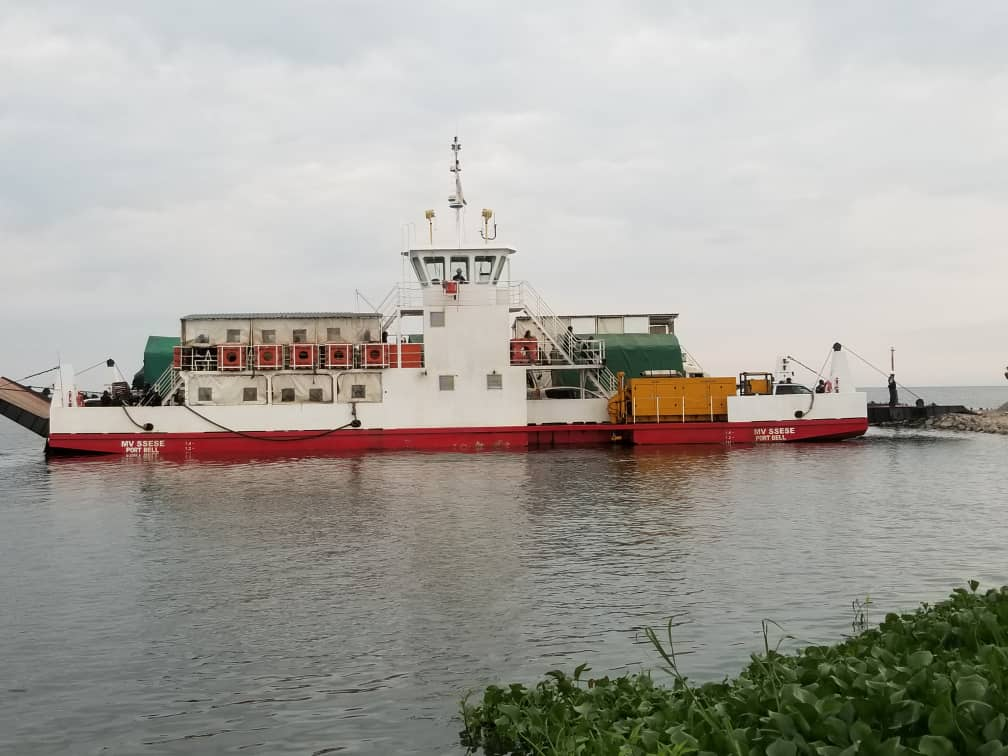
Mv Ssese docking at Bukakata

Bukakata, sometimes spelled as Bukakkata, is a lakeside town in Masaka District, Central Uganda.

== Location ==
Bukakata is located approximately 44 kilometres (27 mi) by road east of Masaka, the nearest large city. This location is on the western shores of Lake Victoria, approximately 65 kilometres (40 mi) by boat southwest of Entebbe. The coordinates of the town are:00 18 18S, 32 02 24E (Latitude:-0.3050; Longitude:32.0400).

== Population ==
The exact population of Bukakata is not known as of May 2011. In 2002 the National Population and Housing Census showed 6,226 children below the age of 18, of whom 23% were orphans.

== Landmarks ==
The landmarks within the town limits or near the town include:

- The offices of Bukakkata Town Council
- Bukakkata Port - A landing site for the ferry that travels daily, between Bukakkata and Kalangala
- Bukakkata Central Market
- The headquarters of Bukakkata Sub-county, one of the administrative units of Masaka District Administration
- "Love in Action" - An NGO has a nursery/Primary and a Secondary School in Kasaka in Makonzi Parish. They also run a Grade 2 Health Clinic on the School premises providing health services for the School and local community.

== See also ==
- Masaka
- Masaka District
- Central Region, Uganda
