= Bugala Island =

Island in Africa

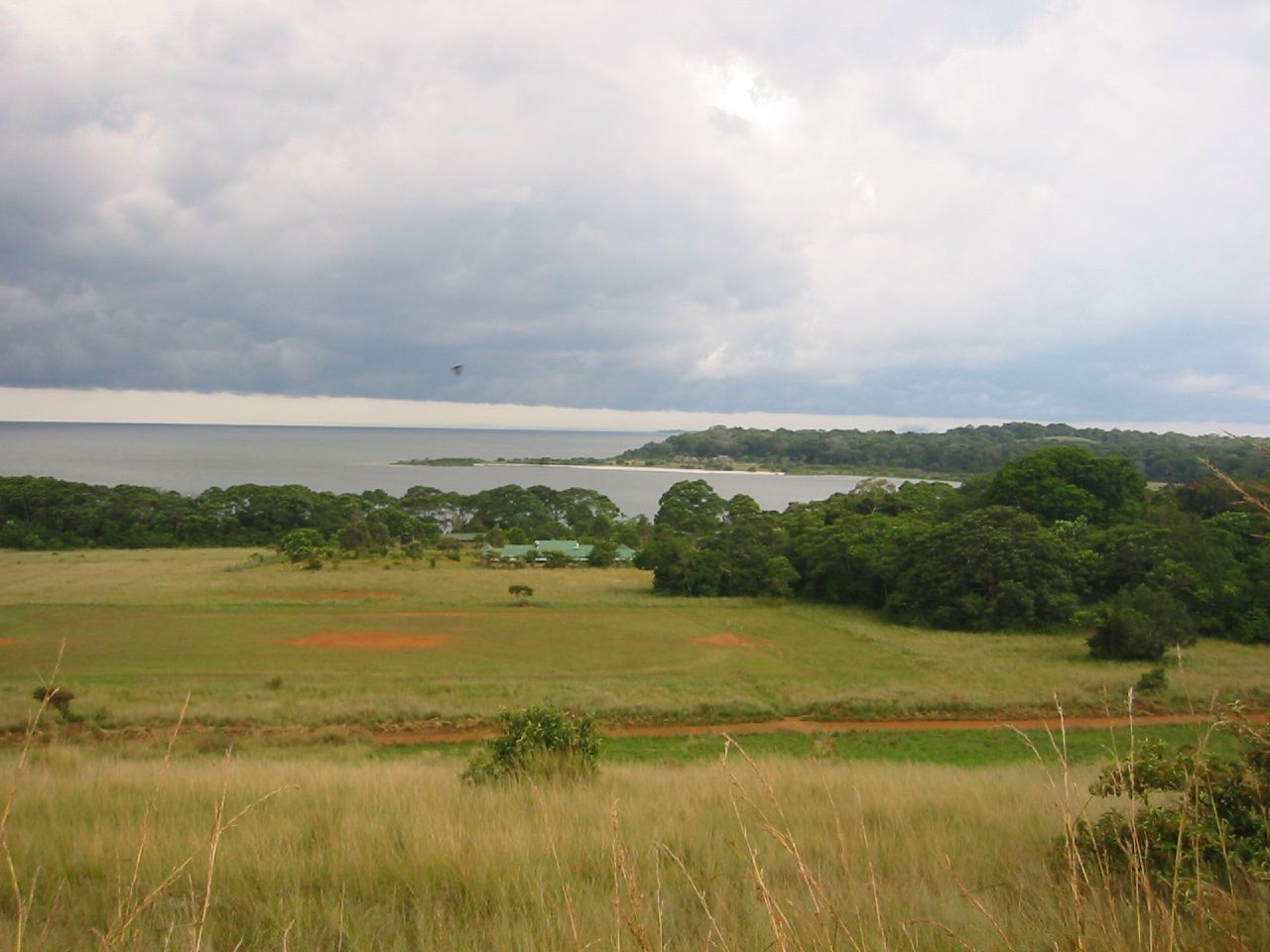
Bugala Island, Lake Victoria, Uganda

Buggala Island, in Uganda, is the tenth-largest lake island in the world. With an area of 275 km^{2} (106 sq mi), it is also the second largest island in Lake Victoria, after Tanzania's Ukerewe Island, and the third largest lake island in Africa, after Ukerewe and Democratic Republic of the Congo's Idjwi. It is a part of the Ssese Islands in the Kalangala District. The chief town of Buggala island is Kalangala. in Kalangala town council, Bujumba county, Kalangala district.

== Infrastructure on Buggala Island ==
Bugala island is the most developed of all the other islands in Kalangala district and acts as the center and main island. The Island is home to two oil palm mills, one located at Bukuzindu in Mugoye sub county and the other at Bwendero all in Bujumba county. It also has a grade 'B' Murram road running from Luku to Kalangala to Mulabana stretching 65.6 Km which acts as the island main road. This road was Rehabilitated by Kalangala Infrastructure services (KIS) in 2016. To it also connects several other feeder roads from landing sites and remote villages. Bugala island also has roads connecting palm oil plantations. Buggala island has hybrid-electric power generated at Bukuzindu in Mugoye subcounty by KIS "..........Bukuzindu Power Plant is a 1.6 MW solar-diesel hybrid power plant that supplies power to the population of the Bugala Island in Lake Victoria. It was commissioned in December 2014 and began operations in March 2015. It currently supplies power to over 3,397 households and 49 commercial customers, including a few hotels and small enterprises........" reads part of the data accessed from Buggala's electricity power supplier' s website. On top of this 'in-house' generated electric power, Buggala Island was connected to the national electricity grid in June 2024 through a 6 km submarine power cable passing through lake Victoria from Bukakata in Masaka District to Bugoma on Buggala Island. Buggala Island is also home to two of the four secondary schools in it mother district kalangala these are Bishop Dunstan Nsubuga Memorial Secondary School in kalangala town council and Sserwanga Lwanga memorial secondary school in Mugoye sub county. The health infrastructure on Buggala Island include Kalangala Health center IV in kalangala town council and other lower ranking health facilities such as health center III and II.

== Economic activities ==
People on Buggala Island engage in four major activities that is

- Fishing
- Plantation agriculture (Oil Palm growing)
- Retail trading
- Tourism Business

== Notable people from Buggala Island ==
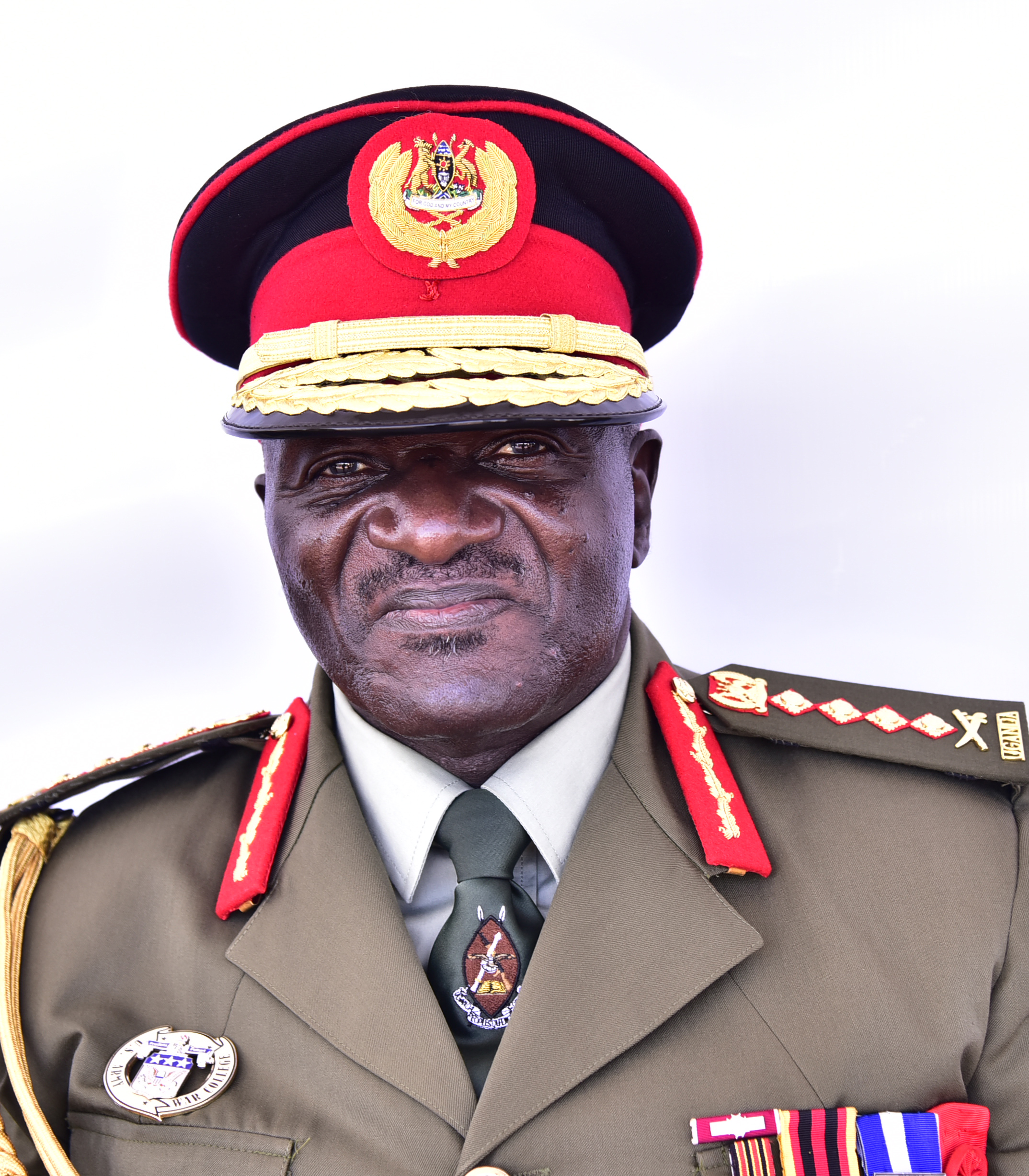
Minister for works and Transport Gen. Katumba wamala. He comes from Buggala Island in Kalangala

- Gen Edward Katumba Wamala (Former Police IGP, CDF and current Minister for works and transport)
- Late Col. Sserwanga Lwanga (Former CA delegate and UPDF political commissar / NRA bush War Veteran)
- Late Hon. Paul Kawanga Ssemogerere (Former Cabinet minister and leader of the Democratic party in Uganda)
- Late Hon. Gerald Mutebi Mulwanira (Former Minister of State for Lands, Housing and Urban Development)

== Tourist attractions and other Heritage sites ==
Bugala Island attracts a number of tourists from mainland Uganda as well as from abroad.

Among the island's main tourist attractions are:

- White sand beaches, primarily located in Lutoboka, including the popular Mirembe resort
- The Luggo Cultural Forest, known as the source of the Ddamula, a symbol of authority in the Buganda Kingdom
- Bugoma, where missionaries Brother Amans and Fr. Siméon Lourdel Marpel (commonly known as Mapeera) are believed to have stopped
- John Speke's Cave, associated with the British explorer's journey in search of the source of the Nile.

== See also ==
- Buvuma Island
- Ngamba Island Chimpanzee Sanctuary
