= Ssese Islands =

Islands of Uganda

Coordinates: 00°26′00″S 32°15′00″E

Location of the Ssese Islands in Uganda

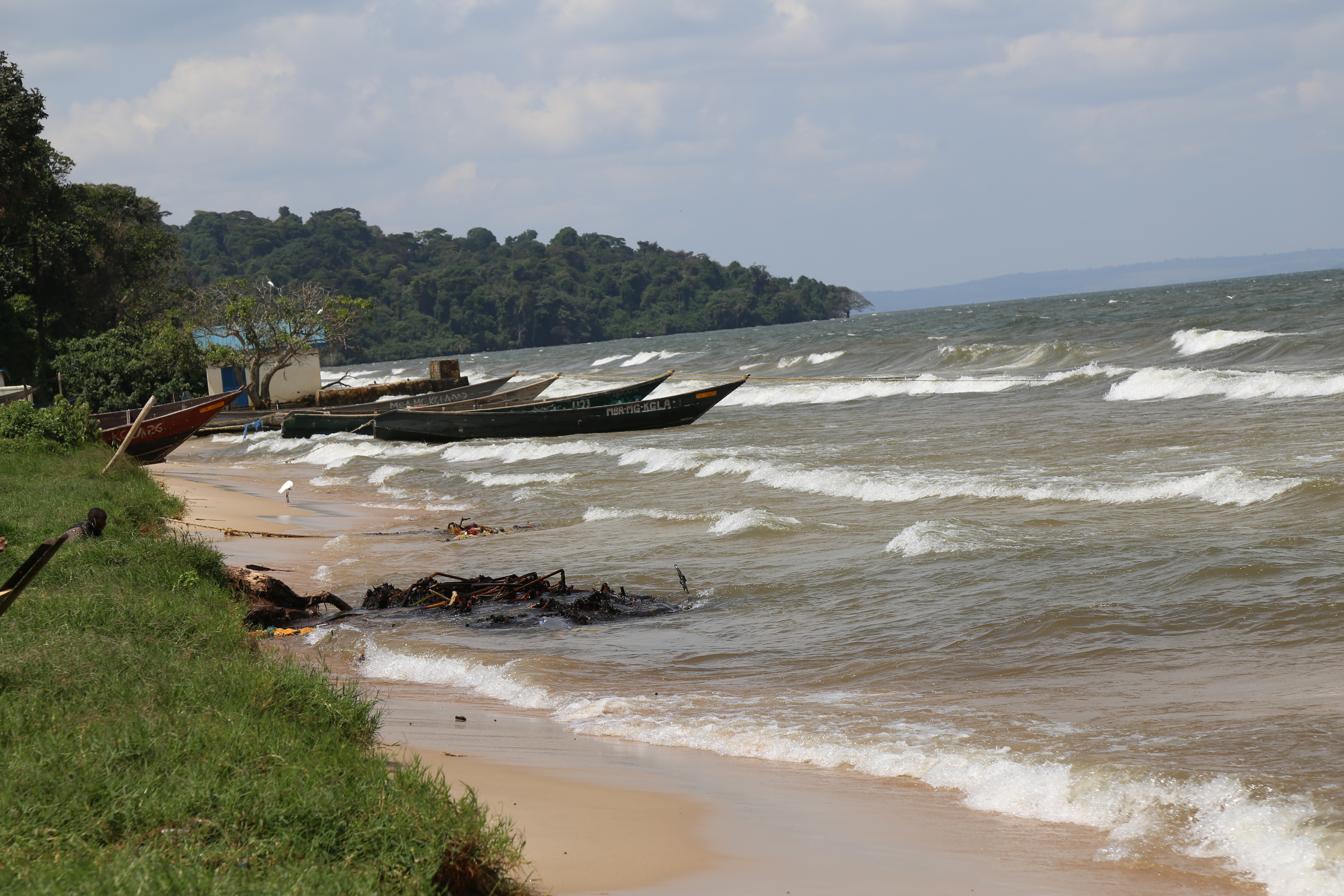
Shores of Lake Victoria at Ssese Islands.

The Ssese Islands are an archipelago of eighty-four islands in the northwestern part of Lake Victoria in Uganda. The islands are coterminous with the Kalangala District in southern Central Uganda, which does not have any territory on mainland Uganda.

== Location ==
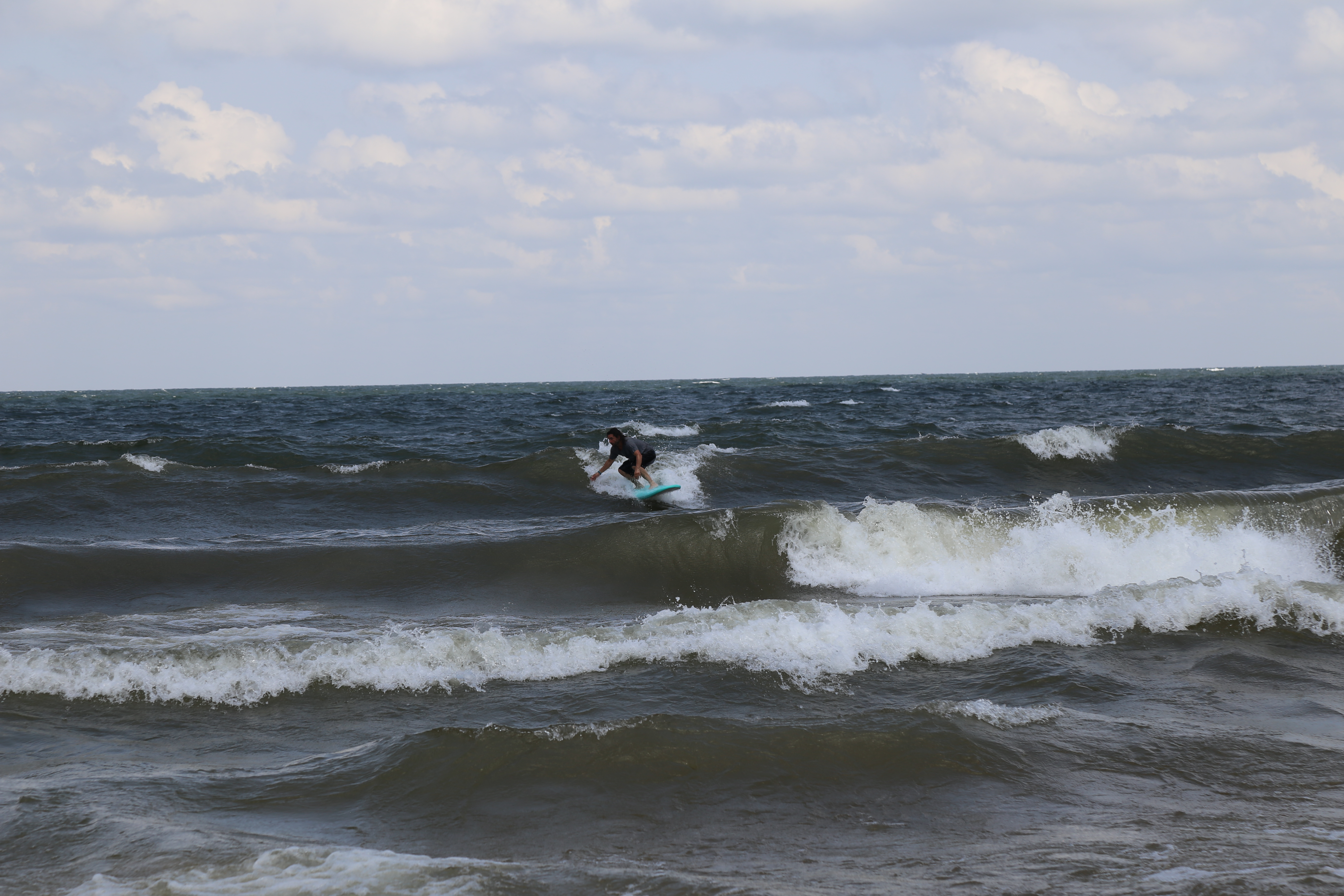
Ssese Islands on Lake Victoria

The islands occupy the northwestern corner of Lake Victoria, the second-largest freshwater lake in the world. The largest island in the archipelago is called Bugala Island, which accounts for more than half the archipelago's land area. Its largest town, called Kalangala, serves as the headquarters of the district that carries the same name (Kalangala District). Kalangala is located approximately 51 kilometres (32 mi), across water, southwest of Entebbe, in Wakiso District, on the Ugandan mainland. The coordinates of the district are:0° 26' 0.00"S, 32° 15' 0.00"E (Latitude:-0.4333; Longitude:32.2500).

The islands lie in two main groups. The south-western one can be referred to as the Bugala Group, after Bugala Island, the largest in the archipelago. The northeastern group can be referred to as the Koome Group, after Koome Island, the largest in that group. The two groups are separated by the Koome Channel. Other islands in the Bugala Group include: Bubeke, Bubembe, Bufumira, Bugaba, Bukasa, Buyova, Funve and Serinya. The main islands in the Koome Group include: Damba, Koome and Luwaji.

== History ==
Little is known about the earliest inhabitants of Ssese, but some oral traditions associated with the creation of Buganda claim its founder Kintu hailed from the islands, or at least arrived in Buganda via them. The Baganda revere Ssese as the Islands of the Gods. In pre-colonial times it was customary for the Kings of Buganda to visit the islands and pay tribute to the several balubaale whose main shrines are situated there. These include shrines to Musisi (spirit of earthquakes) and Wanema (physical handicaps) on Bukasa Island, as well as the shrine of Mukasa (spirit of the lake), on Bubembe.

== Overview ==
The Ssese Islands are inhabited by the Bantu-speaking Bassese tribe, closely related to the Baganda and the Basoga, and speaking a similar, though distinct language. Prior to the arrival of Europeans, the islands were one of the most important spiritual centers of the region. About 43 (50%) of the islands are inhabited. The islands vary in size from less than 10,000 square metres (2.5 acres), to over 40 kilometres (25 mi) in length for the largest island, Bugala Island.

Henry Morton Stanley described the inhabitants as "the principal canoe builders and the greater number of the sailors of Mtesa's empire."

== Travel ==
The most popular route that the islands can be accessed from is through Nakiwogo near Entebbe by MV Kalangala as the main gateway to the archipelagos. Transfer between Nakiwogo and Bugala Island is usually 3½ hours.

From Bukakata: From the western part of Uganda, two free car ferries links Bukakata mainland located 36km east of Masaka with Luku on Bugala Island about 50 minutes sailing. The ferries sail from either directions every few hours from early morning at 7am to late evening at 6pm. The morning trips on Sunday are not available until 8am.

From Kasenyi landing site: To get to Banda Island, there are small wooden boats departing from Kasenyi, a fishing village 7 km off Entebbe-Kampala road; turn off is 5 km outside Entebbe.

On Bugala island there are shared taxis that run from Luku in land port to as far as mulabana at the extreme end of the island and nearby landing sites. Boda boda are also a popular means of transport on the island.

== Economic activity ==
The principal industry in the Ssese Islands is fishing for the huge Nile Perch, with much of the catch being exported. Overfishing is a huge concern on these and other islands in Lake Victoria. Other industries include agriculture, forestry and tourism.

Livestock farming is practiced on the islands. It is estimated that 3,000 cattle, 250,000 poultry (chicken and ducks), 1,235 goats and 7,000 pigs are kept on the islands.

BIDCO, a private palm oil processor based in Jinja District, on the mainland, owns a 15,000 acres (6,100 ha) palm oil plantation on the islands. In addition, outgrower farmers grow palm oil on contract with BIDCO and sell their produce to the processor. In 2010, the palm oil plant began generating 1.5MW of electricity through the burning of bagasse and some of the oil. The power supplies the oil processing plant and the excess is sold to Kalangala, the largest town on the islands.

Logging is another economic activity that is practiced on the Ssese Islands.

== Flora and fauna ==
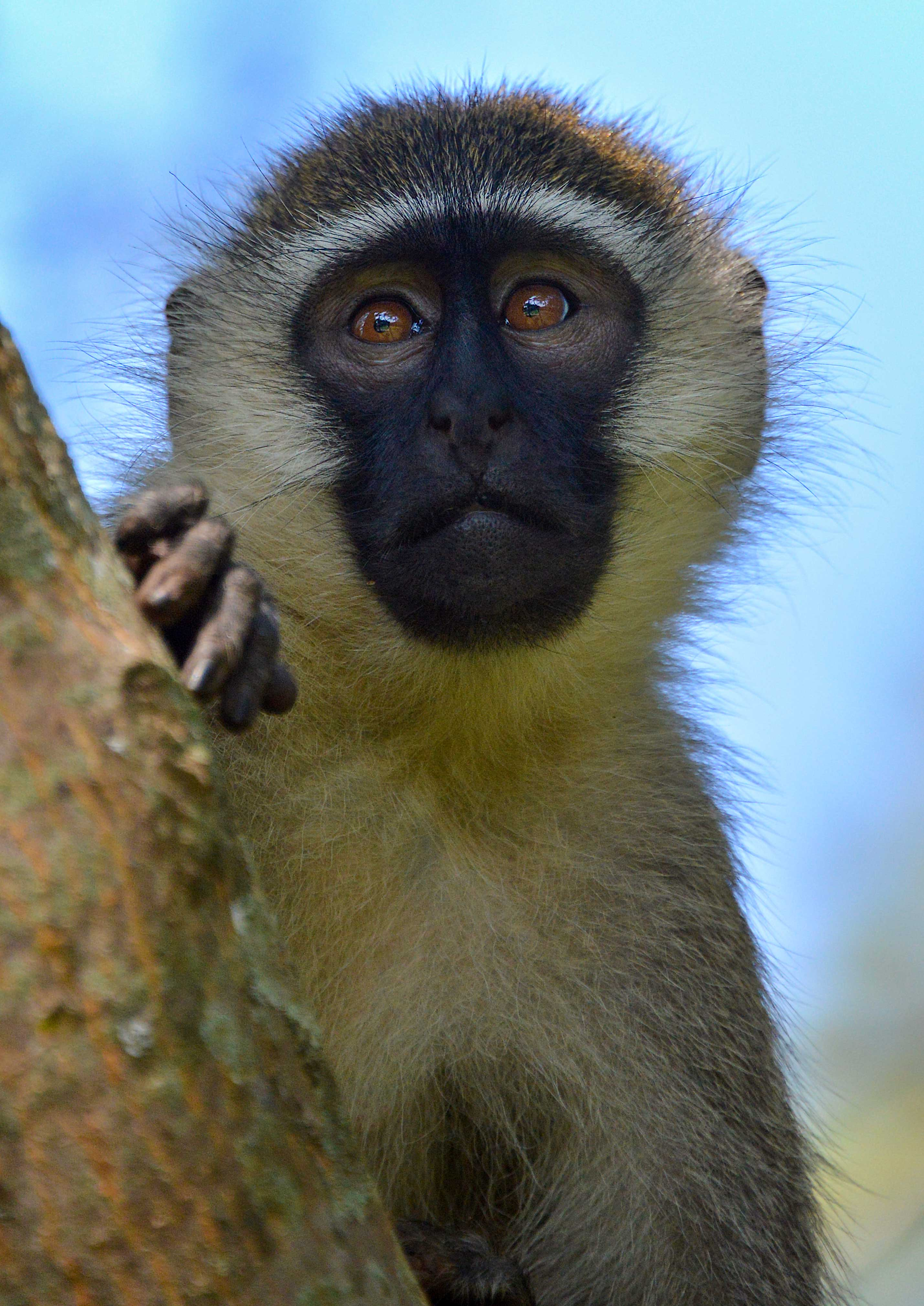
Vervet Monkey in Uganda

The islands are also home to a variety of animals including primates, which are not easily accessible on the mainland. The most common large terrestrial mammal is the Vervet monkey, which is often seen in the vicinity of Lutoboka and Kalangala. Bushbuck and black-and-white colobus are also present, but seldom observed. Since Buggala was separated from the mainland, one endemic creek rat and three endemic butterfly species have evolved on the island. Water and forest birds are prolific. There's a variety of hornbills, barbets, turacos, robin-chats, flycatchers and weavers. Particularly common are the jewel-like pygmy kingfisher, the brown-throated wattle-eye and the paradise flycatcher. African fish eagles and palm-nut vultures are often seen near the lake, while immense breeding colonies of little egret and great cormorant occur on Lutoboka and other bays.

This has led to the evolution of a nascent but growing tourism industry on the islands. Infrastructure is still rudimentary but is slowly improving.

== See also ==
- Victoria Basin forest-savanna mosaic
- Kalangala District
- Koome Island
- Bugala Island
- Bugala Power Station
- Kalangala
- Central Region, Uganda
- Kiwumulo Cave
