= Masaka District =

Masaka District, Uganda Wilaya ya Masaka
- District
- Masaka District
- District location in Uganda
- Coordinates: 00°22′S 31°42′E
- Country: Uganda
- Region: Buganda
- Capital: Masaka

Area
  - Land: 1,295.6 km^{2} (500.2 sq mi)
- Elevation: 1,115 m (3,658 ft)

Population (2012 Estimate)
  - Total: 251,600
  - Density: 194.2/km^{2} (503/sq mi)
- Time zone: UTC+3 (EAT)
- Website: www.masaka.go.ug

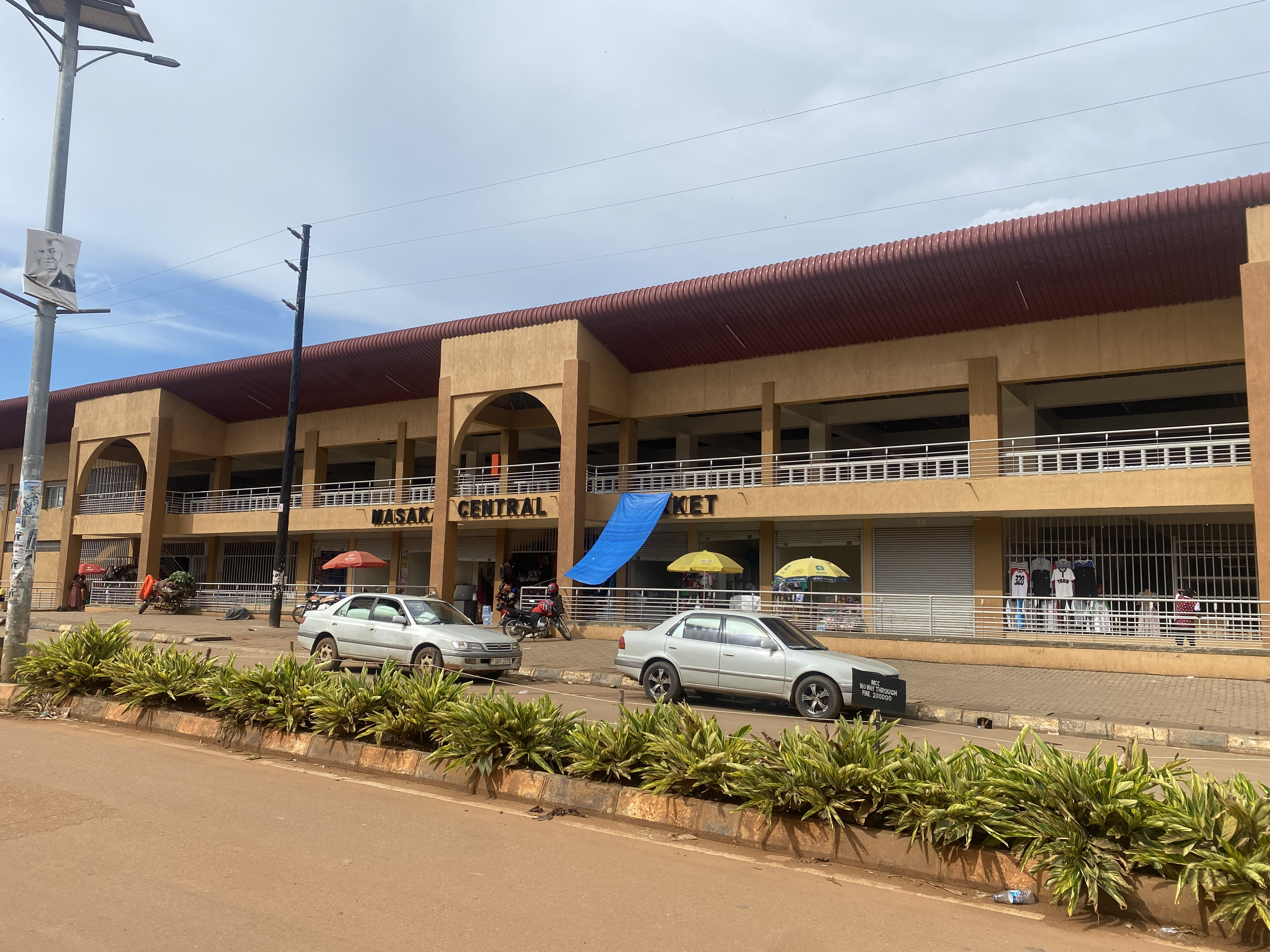
Masaka Central Market in Uganda

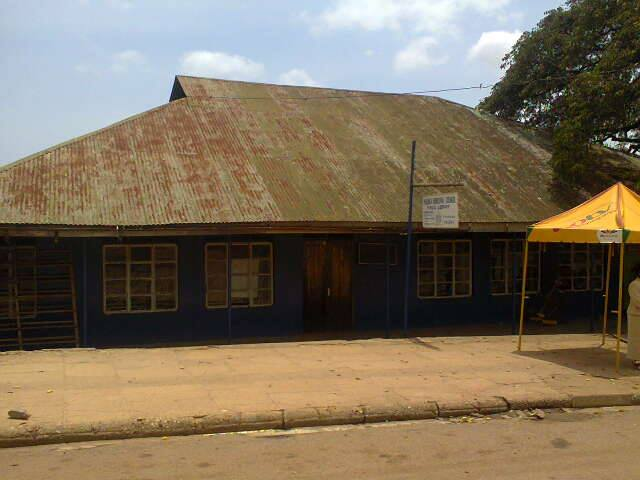
Wikipedia biblioteca municipal masaka.jpg

Masaka District is a district in Buganda Kingdom in Uganda. Its main town is Masaka City, whose estimated population in 2011 was 74,100.

== Location ==
The district is bordered by Masaka City to the north-west and west, Kalungu District to the north, Kalangala District to the east, and Kyotera District to the south-west and south. The town of Masaka, where the district headquarters are located, is approximately 140 kilometres (87 mi) south-west of Kampala on the highway to Mbarara. The coordinates of the district are 00 30S, 31 45E. The average altitude of the district is 1,115 metres (3,658 ft) above sea level.

== Overview ==
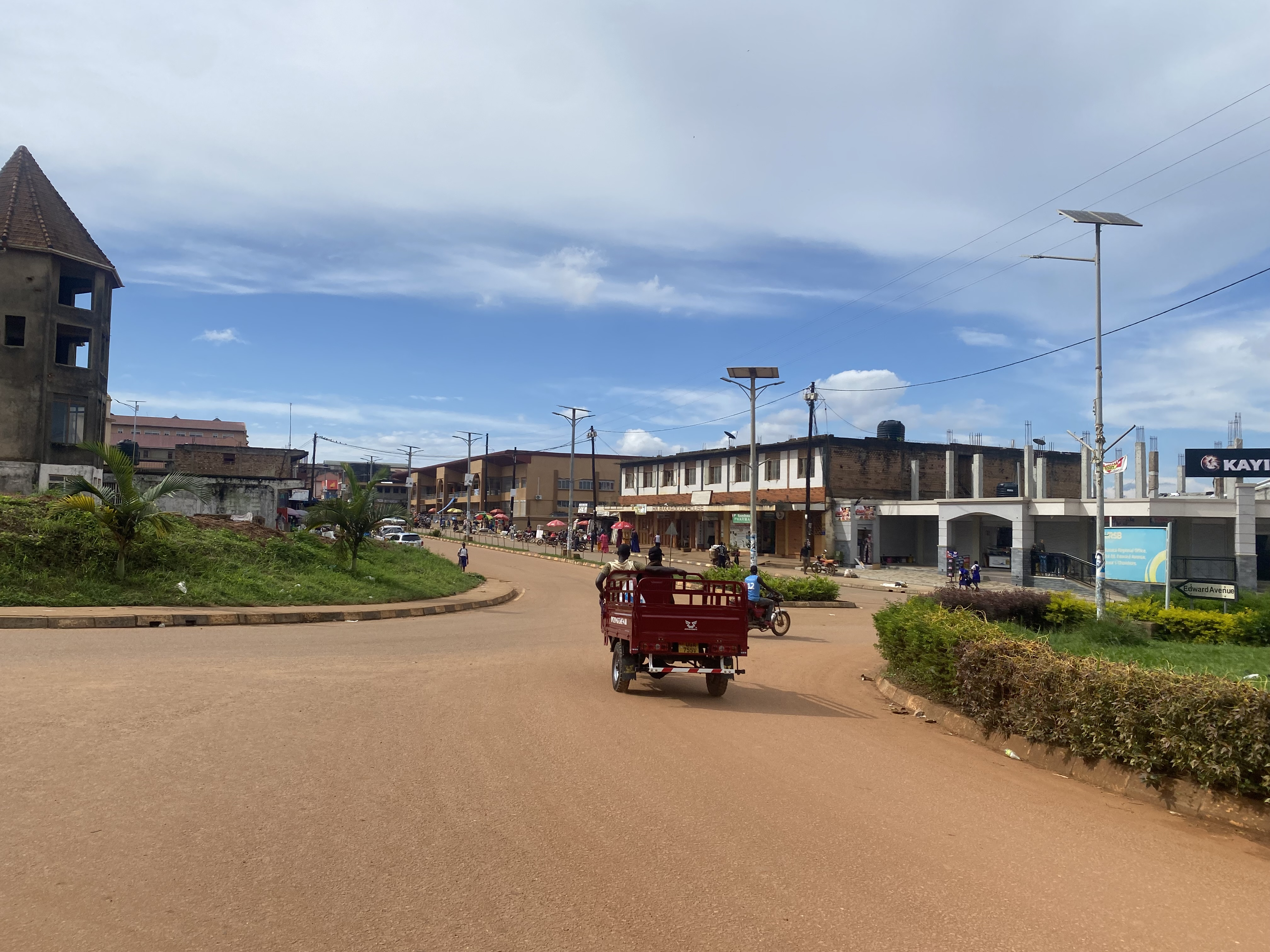
A street view in Masaka town

Masaka District was established in the 1900s, composed of the Buganda Kingdom's former counties of Buddu, Kooki, Kabula, Mawogola, and Ssese Islands. Kooki and Kabula were peeled off to form Rakai District. Later, the northern part of Rakai District was removed to form Lyantonde District. The Ssese Islands were removed to form Kalangala District. In 1997, Mawogola County was split from Buddu and was named Sembabule District. Buddu remained as Masaka District. In 2010, Buddu itself was split into four districts, namely Masaka District, Bukomansimbi District, Kalungu District, and Lwengo District. In 2020, two sub-counties (Mukungwe and Kabonera) from Masaka District were added to Masaka Municipal Council to form Masaka City.

Administratively, the district council is the highest political authority. The council has 43 members headed by a district chairperson. The technical team at the district is subdivided into the following directories: 1. Education & Sports 2. Health & Environment 3. Works & Technical Services 4. Production & Marketing 5. Finance & Planning 6. Management Support Services 7. Gender & Community Services.

== Population ==
The 1991 national census estimated the district population at 203,600. The 2002 census estimated the population at 228,200, with an annual population growth rate of 1.0 percent. In 2012, the population was estimated at 251,600. From the 2014 population and housing census, the district population was estimated at 297,004.^{[7]} Mid-year population projections by Uganda Bureau of Statistics^{[8]} estimated the district population at 127,600 in 2023.

== See also ==
- Districts of Uganda
- Buganda Kingdom
