= Kalangala District =

- District
- District location in Uganda
- Coordinates: 00°26′S 32°15′E
- Country: Uganda
- Region: Central Uganda
- Capital: Kalangala

Area
  - Total: 9,103.0 km^{2} (3,514.7 sq mi)
  - Land: 468.3 km^{2} (180.8 sq mi)
  - Water: 8,634.7 km^{2} (3,333.9 sq mi)
- Elevation: 1,240 m (4,070 ft)

Population (2012 Estimate)
  - Total: 66,300
  - Density: 141.6/km^{2} (367/sq mi)
- Time zone: UTC+3 (EAT)
- Website: www.kalangala.go.ug

Kalangala, also known as Ssesse, is a district in Central Uganda. The district is coterminous with the Ssese Islands in Lake Victoria and does not have territory on mainland Uganda. Like other Ugandan districts, it is named after its 'chief town', Kalangala which is located on Bugala Island, the largest of the Ssese Islands. To reach Kalangala town on Bugala island one has to board a boat at specified points (ports/landing sites) or use one of the Ferries sailing through the Bukakata-Luku route that joins the town with the mainland in Masaka District. There is also a relatively longer route that passes via Nakiwogo in Wakiso district to connect to Lutoboka on Bugala Island.

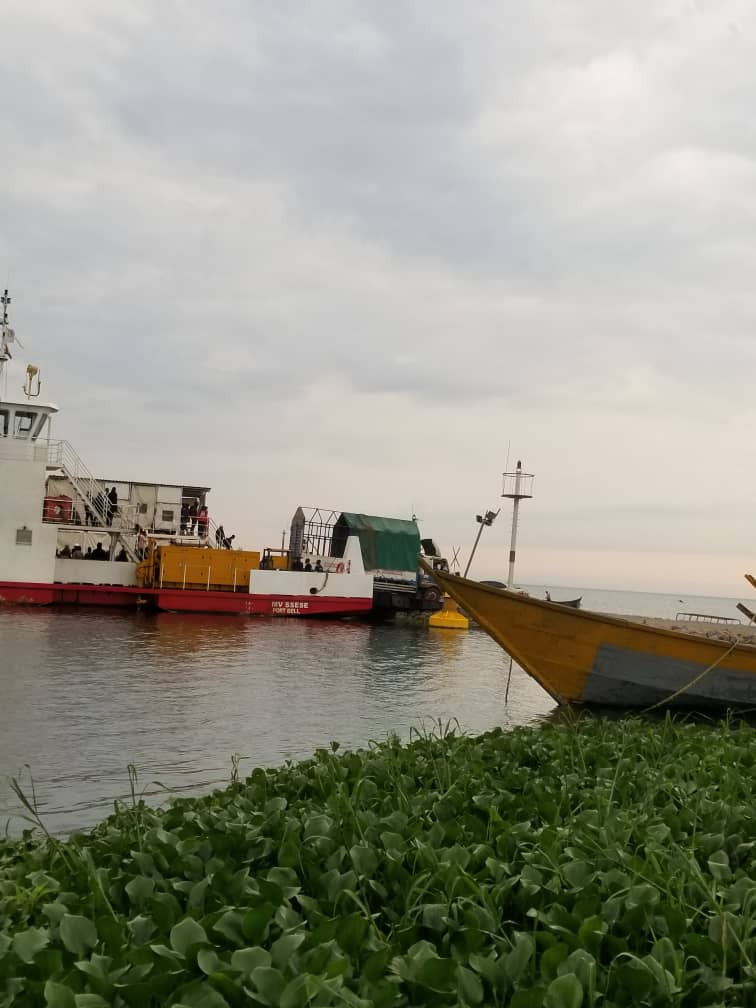
MV Ssese Portbell ferry, that transports people and goods between Kalangala District and Masaka District

== Location ==
Kalangala District is bordered by Mpigi District and Wakiso District to the north, Mukono District to the northeast and east, the Republic of Tanzania to the south, Rakai District to the southwest, Masaka District to the west and Kalungu District to the northwest. The Kalangala district headquarters are located approximately 60 kilometres (37 mi), across water, southwest of Entebbe, in Wakiso District. The coordinates of the district are: 00 26S, 32 15E.

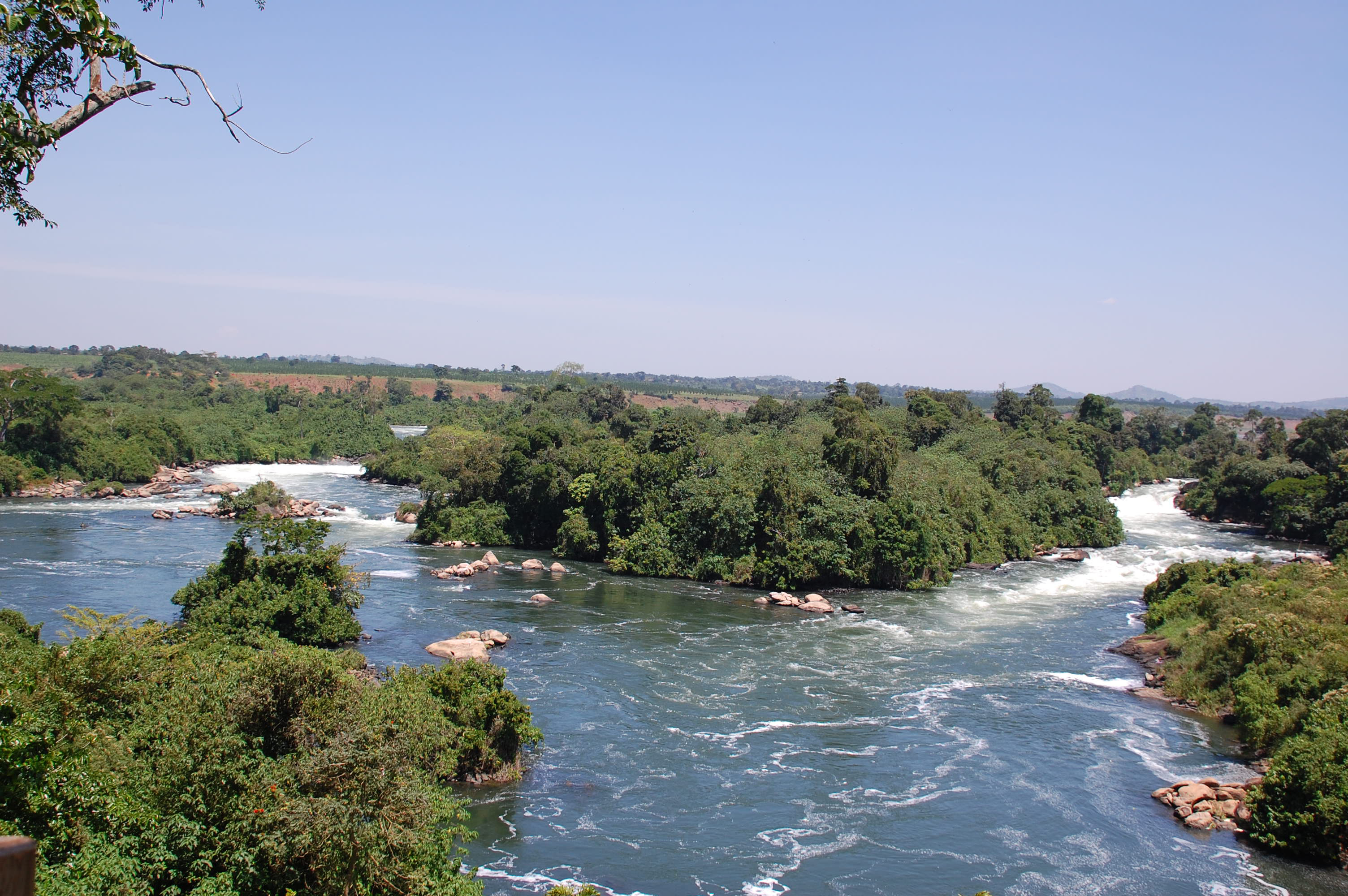
Kalangala-Itanda offset falls(e).jpg

== Overview ==
Kalangala District covers an area of 9,103 square kilometres (3,515 mi^{2}), of which only 468.3 square kilometres (180.8 mi^{2}) (5.1%) is land and the rest is open water. The district is made up of eighty four widely scattered islands in the northwestern part of Lake Victoria of which only forty three are inhabited. The biggest island is Bugala Island which covers 296 square kilometres (114 mi^{2}) or 63.2% of the district land mass.

== Population ==
The 1991 national population census estimated the district population at about 16,400. Eleven years later, the 2002 national census estimated the population of the district at approximately 34,800, with an annual population growth rate of 6.8%. In 2012, it was estimated that the population of Kalangala District was about 66,300.

The table below illustrates the growth trajectory of the district population during the first decade of the 21st century. All numbers are estimates. Kalangala District has the lowest population of all Ugandan districts.

Kalangala District Population Trends

Year	Est. Pop.
2002	34,800
2003	37,200
2004	39,700
2005	42,400

Year	Est. Pop.
2006	45,300
2007	48,400
2008	51,700
2009	55,200

Year	Est. Pop.
2010	59,000
2011	63,000

== Economic activities ==
The three pillars of the district economy are: (a) fishing (b) tourism and (c) agriculture. The majority of the islanders depend a lot on fishing. The fishermen migrate following the seasonal movements of fish. Over-fishing remains a concern.

Due to its location, its climate and its relative isolation, the district is a tourist magnet. Tourist facilities are rudimentary in most areas, although improvements in infrastructure (accommodations, road networks, communications, electricity supply, piped water etc.) are slowly taking place.

Bidco Uganda, a private palm oil processor based in Jinja, maintains a controversial 15,000 acres (6,100 ha) palm oil plantation in the district. In addition, out grower farmers grow palm oil on contract with Bidco and sell their produce to the processor.

Livestock farming and logging are other economic activities practiced in the district. As of May 2014, it was estimated that the livestock count in the district stood as follows:

- 2,999 cattle, 250,000 poultry (chicken and ducks), 1,235 goats, and 7,000 pigs.

== Land insecurity ==
According to Friends of the Earth International (FEI), Oil Palm Uganda Limited (OPUL) is involved in a long running dispute over land with local communities in Uganda. OPUL is 93 percent owned by Bidco Uganda, which itself is a joint venture formed by Wilmar International, Josovina Commodities, and Bidco Africa.

According to The Guardian in March 2015, the land grabbing issue has plagued the community of Kalangala for a number of years. In July 2011 residents awoke to "find yellow machines churning up ... land and razing the crops ... grown in a bid to make way for palm oil plantations." According to FEI, the project implications include forced displacement, poor labour standards, deforestation, and insecurity, amongst others. The community has taken the venture to court.

David Balironda, the Kalangala district production officer, said he saw people being compensated. When asked why he had not objected to the inadequate compensation paid, he said: “It was their agreement with the landlord. These people were squatters on someone’s land. They agreed on the amount of money. ... I blame the NGOs; it is them amplifying people to rise up and demand for land even when they were compensated.”

== Climate of Kalangala ==
The climate in Kalangala is warm, muggy, and overcast. Over the course of the year, the temperature typically varies from 67°F to 79°F and is rarely below 65°F or above 83°F.

Based on the tourism score, the best time of year to visit Kalangala for warm-weather activities is from early June to mid September.

== See also ==
- Ssese Islands
- Bugala Island
- Central Region, Uganda
- Districts of Uganda
