= Kalangala =

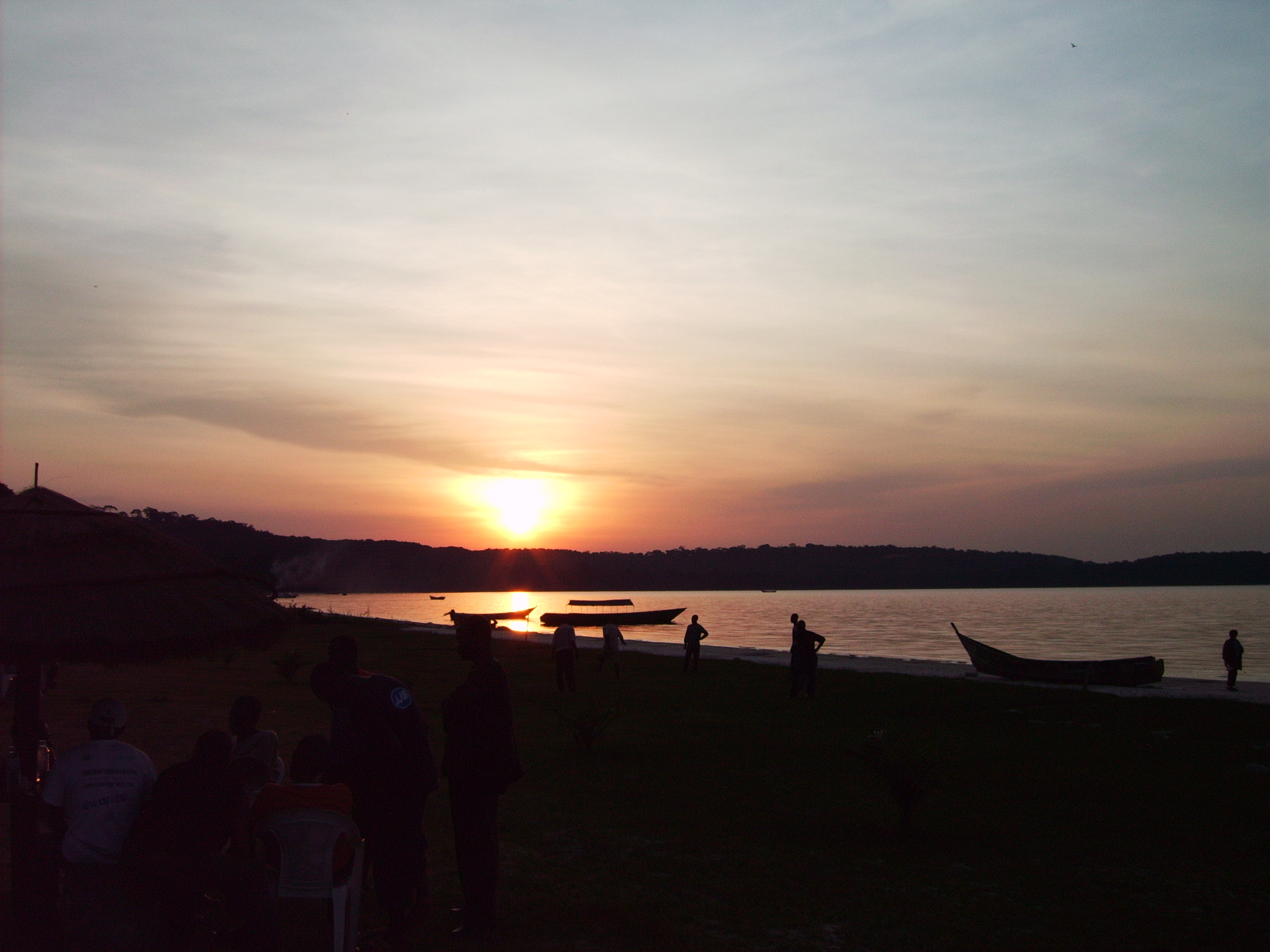
- Kalangala beach overlooking the lake at sunset

- Location in Uganda
- Coordinates: 00°19′17″S 32°17′31″E
- Country: Uganda
- Region: Central Uganda
- District: Kalangala District
- Elevation: 1,220 m (4,000 ft)

Population (2011 Estimate)
  - Total: 5,200

Kalangala is a town in Kalangala District in the Central Region of Uganda. It is the headquarters of the district.

== Location ==
Kalangala is on the northern shore of Bugala Island, the largest of the Ssese Islands in Lake Victoria. It is approximately 60 kilometres (37 mi), across water, southwest of Entebbe. The coordinates of the town are0°19'17.0"S, 32°17'31.0"E (Latitude:-0.321389; Longitude:32.291944).

== Overview ==
Kalangala is on the northern beach of Bugala Island, which constitutes the bulk (68.5 percent) of the land mass of Kalangala District.

== Population ==
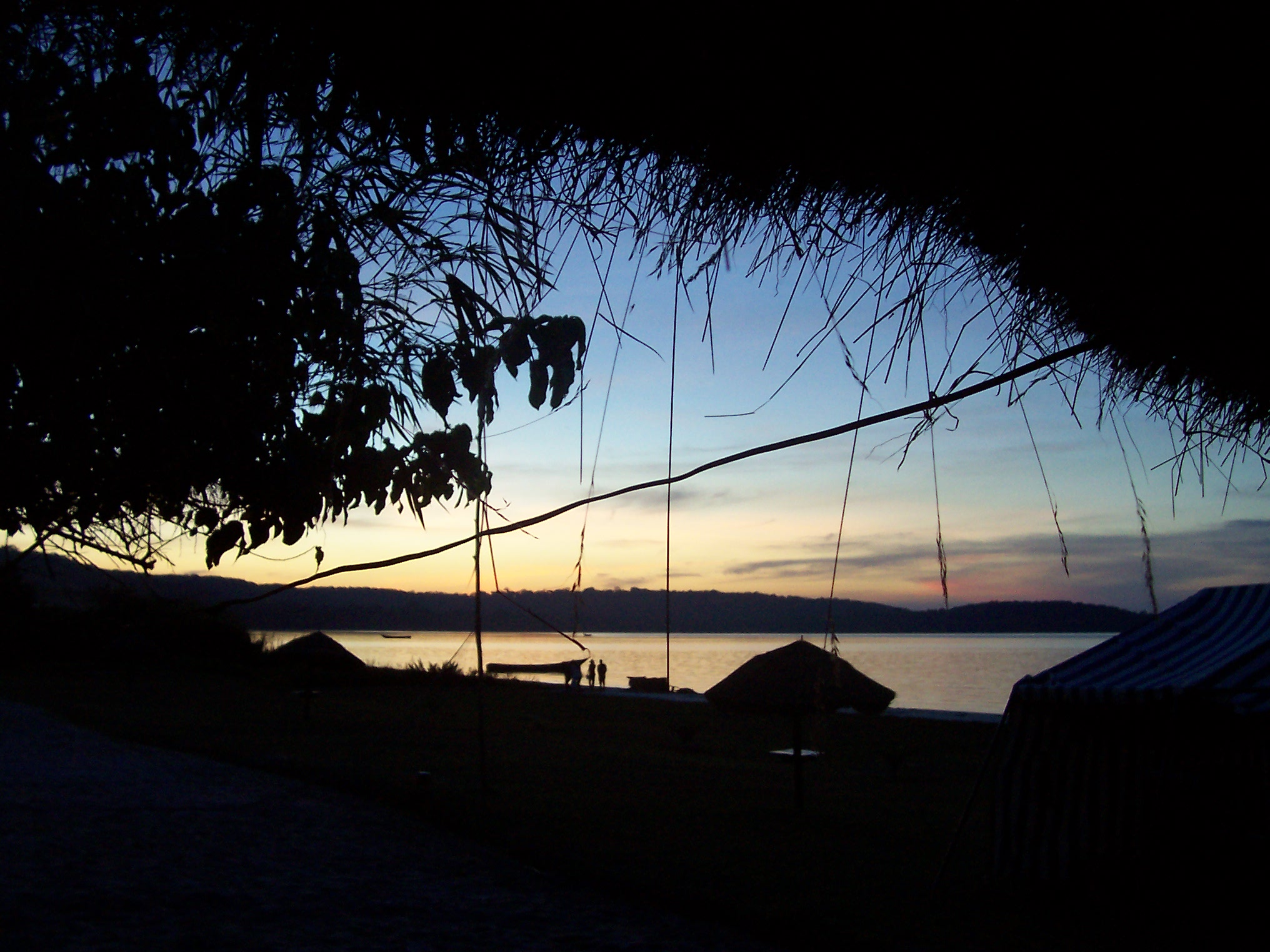
Africa Uganda Kalangala Island Scenic

The 2002 national census estimated the population of the town at 2,950. In 2010, the Uganda Bureau of Statistics (UBOS) estimated the population of the town at 4,900. In 2011, UBOS estimated the mid-year population at 5,200.

== Points of interest ==
The following points of interest lie within or close to the town limits:

- Kalangala Information Center
- Kalangala central market
- offices of Kalangala Town Council

== See also ==
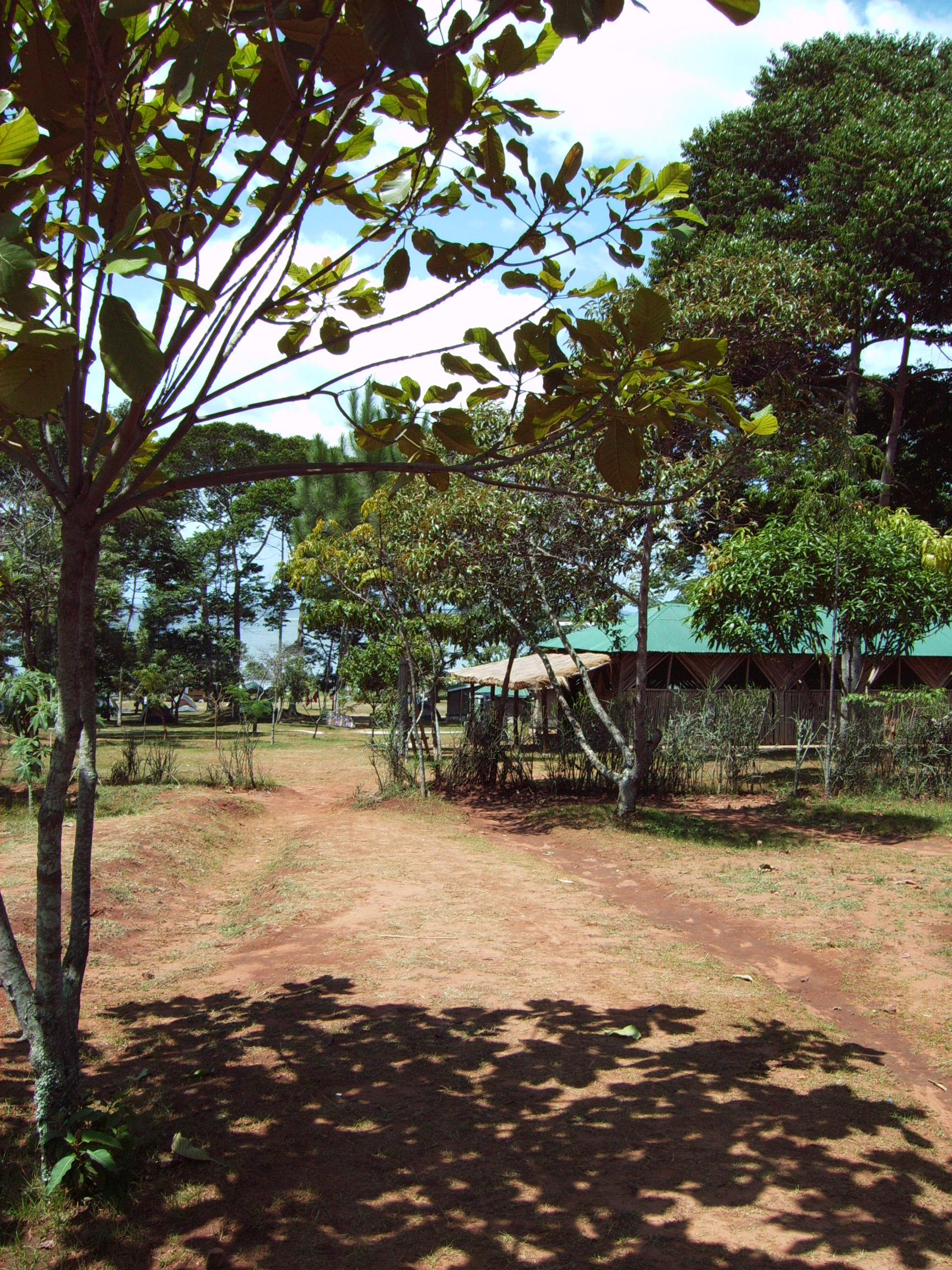
Africa Uganda Kalangala Island

* List of cities and towns in Uganda
