= Fishing industry in Uganda =

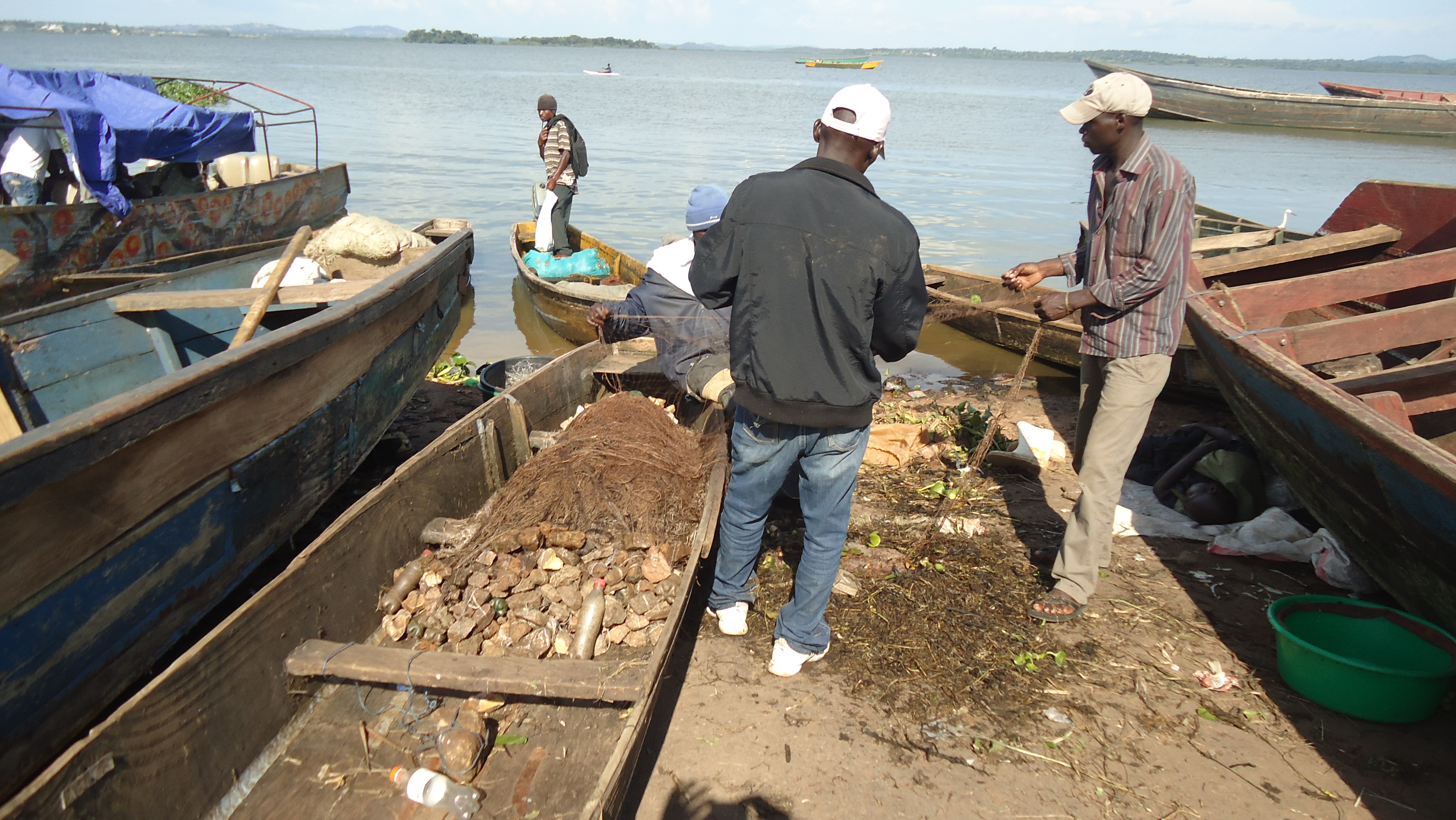
Fisherman with a small net for fishing at Gaba landing site, Kampala.

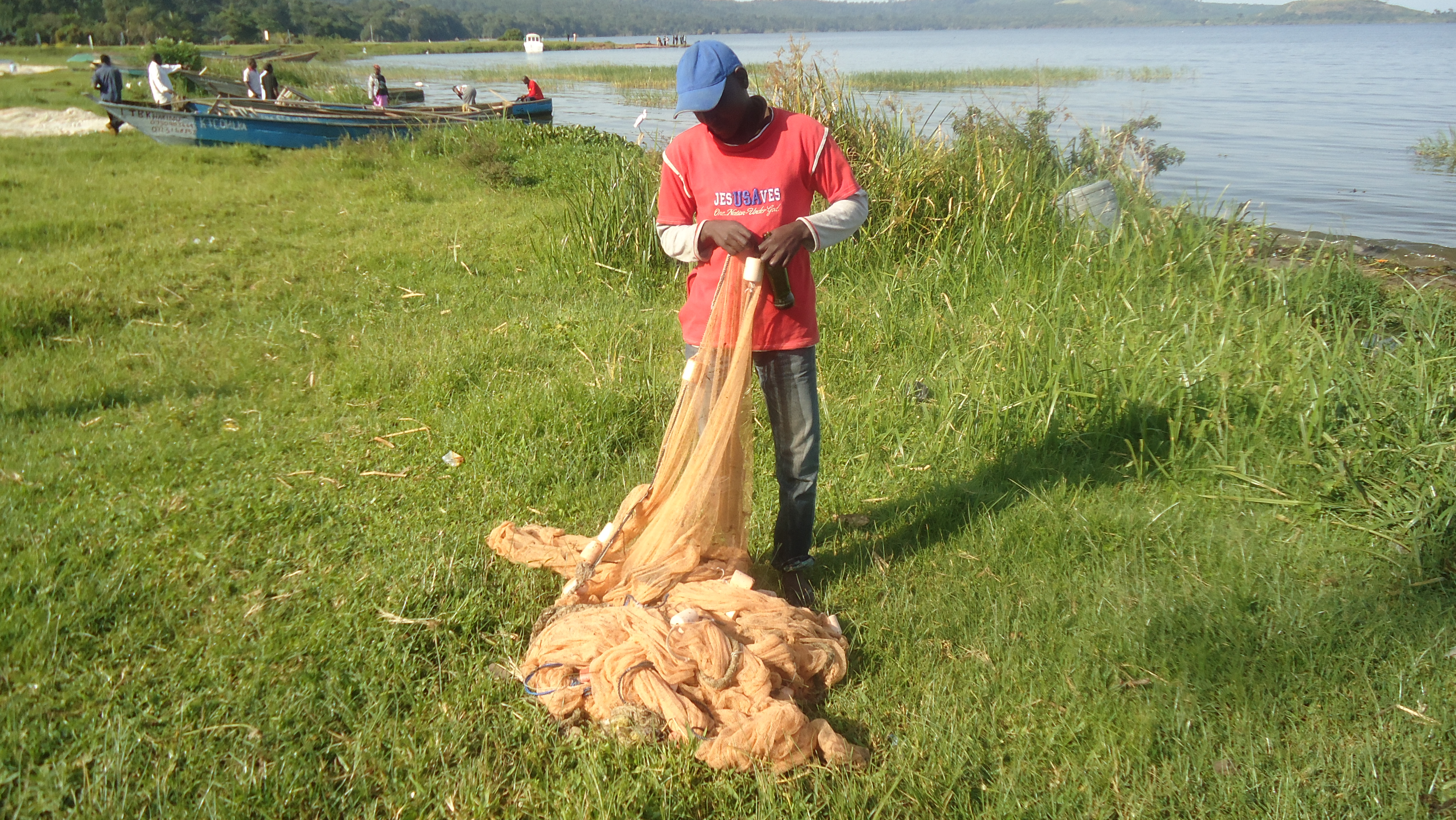
A fisherman with a fish net for sprat

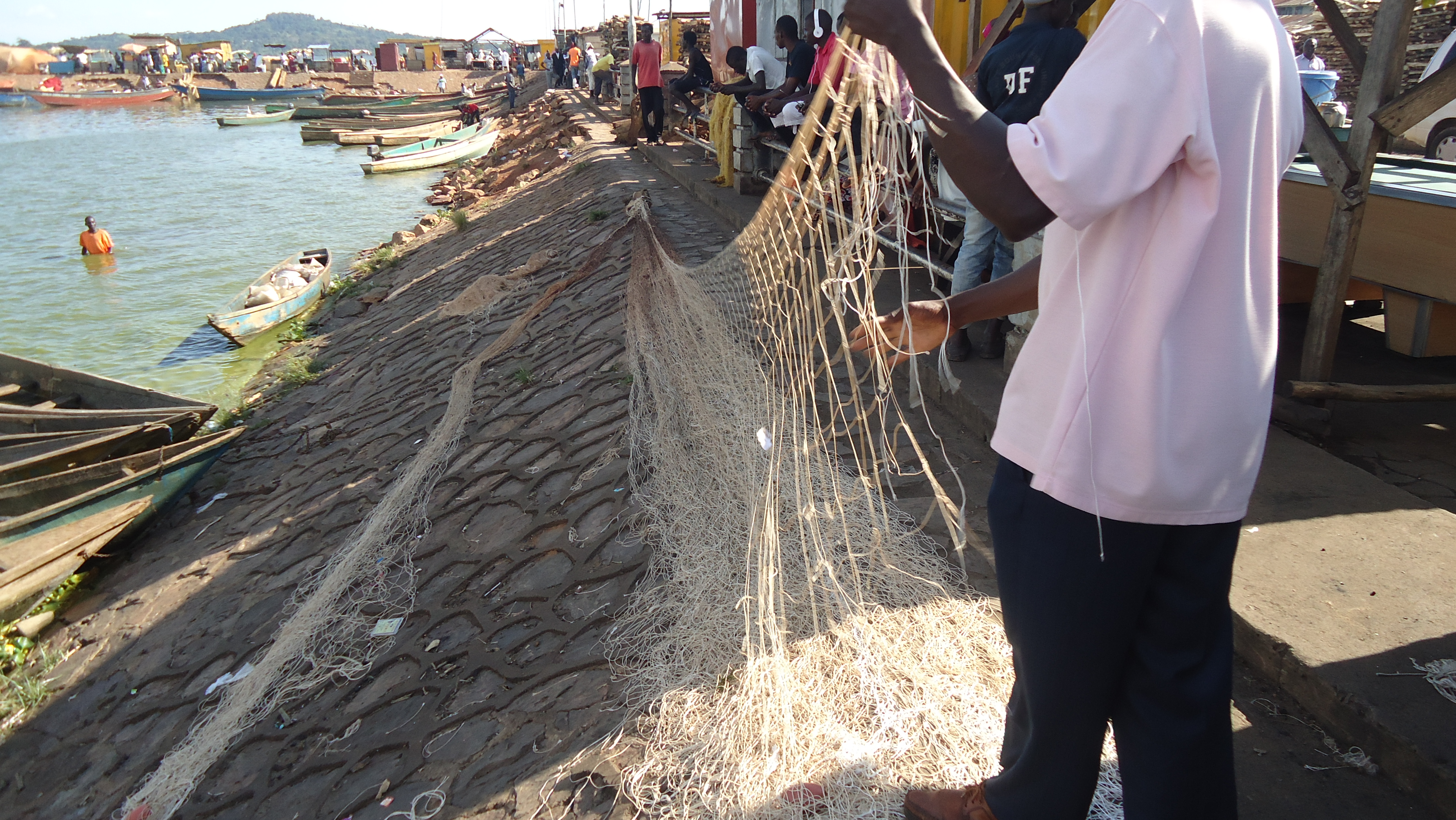
A fisherman preparing a net for fishing at Gaba landing site, Kampala.

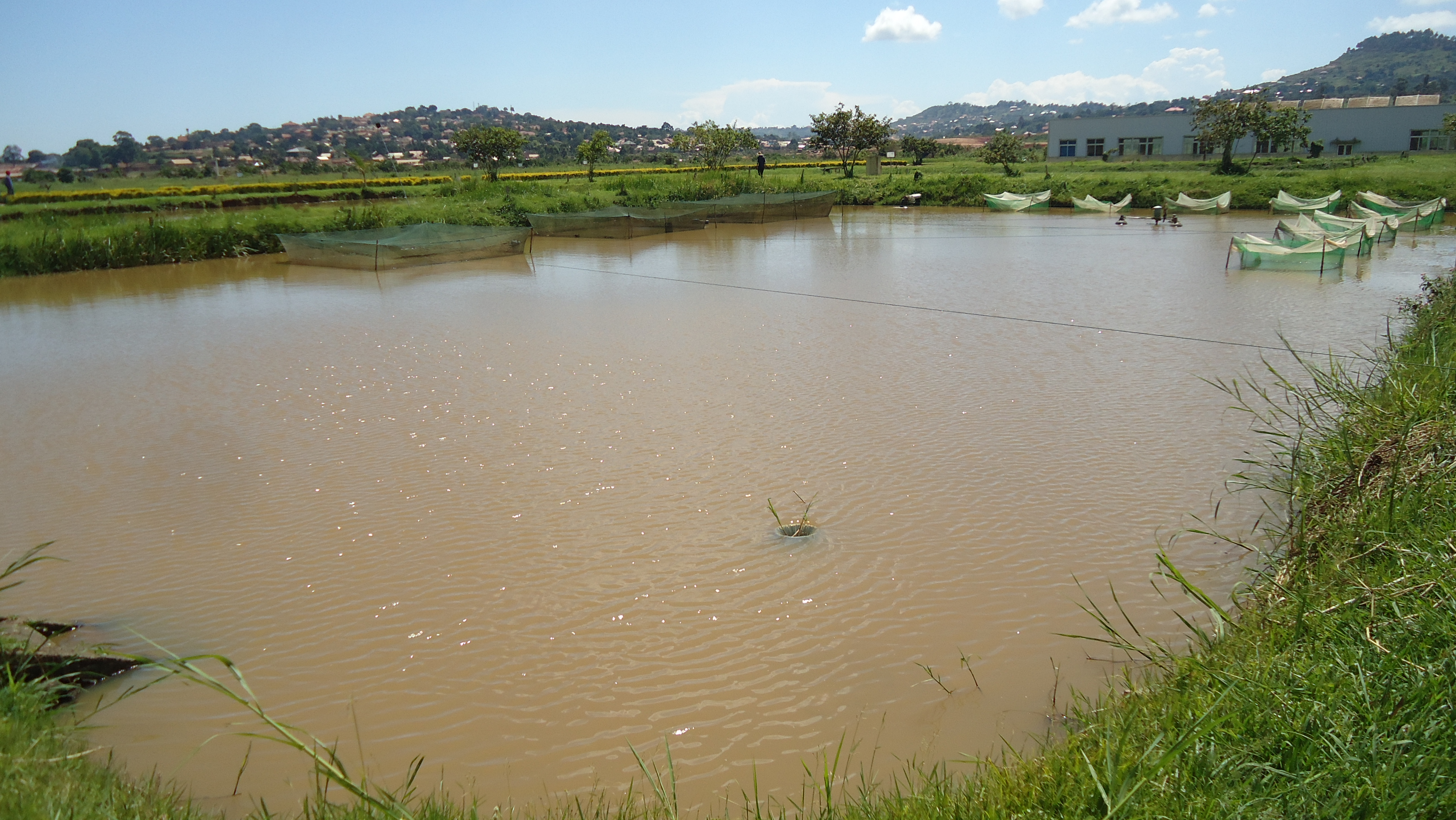
fish breeding pond at Aquaculture Research and Development Centre, Kajjansi

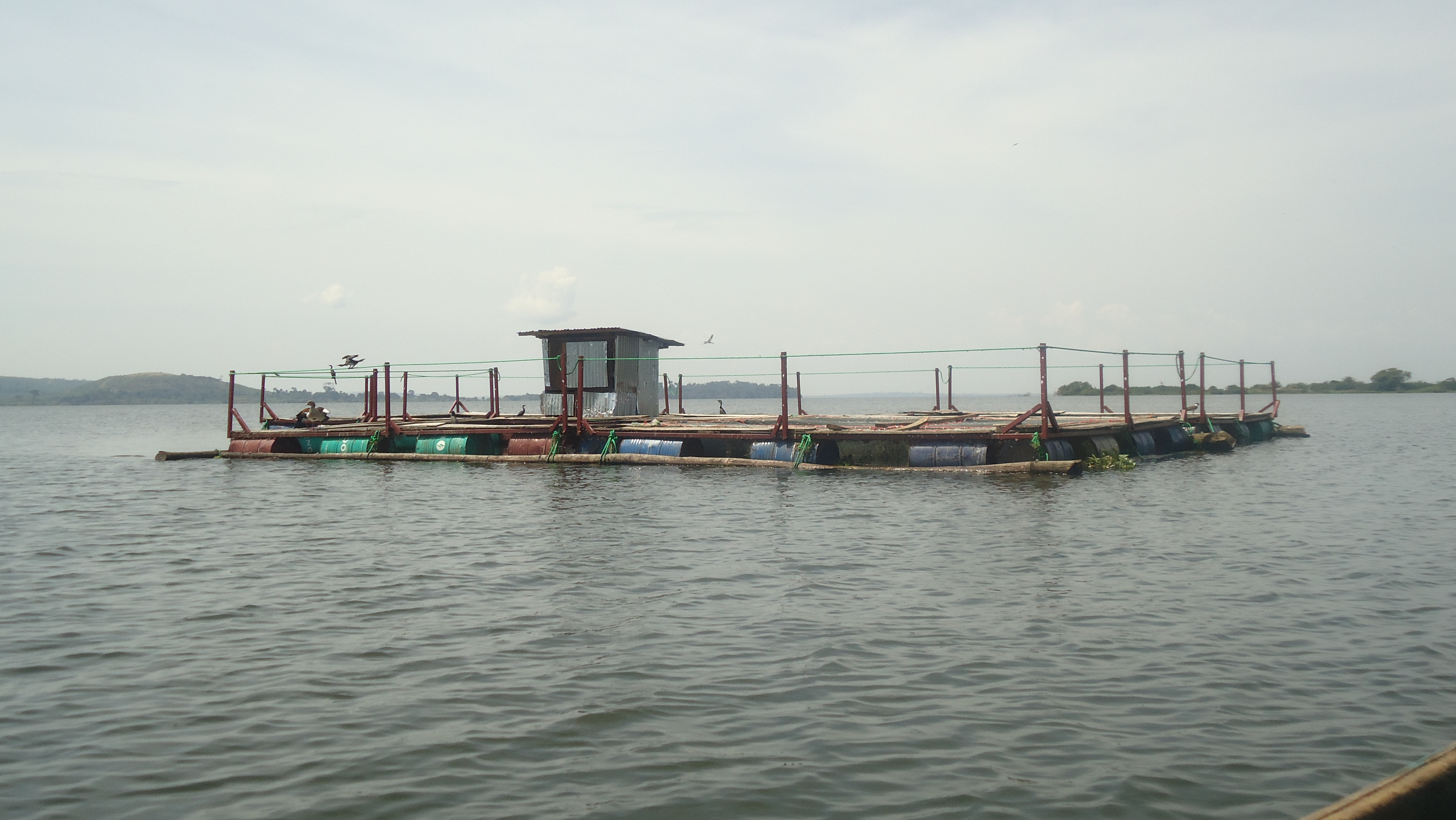
Fish cage off the shore of lutoboka landing site kalangala

There are two major sources of fish in Uganda; one is from aquaculture, the other from fishing in rivers and lakes. The latter has made up the largest and most significant share of all fishing. Open water covers 15.3 percent of Uganda's surface and comprises five major lakes (Lake Victoria, Lake Albert (Africa), Lake Kyoga, Lake Edward and Lake George (Uganda)) which are the main sources of fish in the country. Lake Victoria continues to be the most important water body in Uganda both in size and contribution to the total fish catch, followed by Lake Albert and Lake Kyoga.

Uganda's main sources of fish supply for both the domestic and export markets are the districts on Lake Victoria, particularly Mukono, Mpigi, Kalangala, Masaka and Luwero. Lake Kyoga, Albert, George and Edward districts are other major sources of fish. The major urban centres within the Lake Victoria belt, namely Kampala, Masaka, Jinja and Entebbe constitute the main domestic market centres for fresh fish. Although considerable fish supplies reach these market nuclei and most of the other district headquarters markets, inadequate supplies reach most of the rural markets.

Primary production of fish is generally done on a relatively small-scale, as most of the fishing is carried out using small, wooden (plank-built) boats about six to eight meters in length propelled by oars or, in an increasing number of cases, a petrol engine fastened to the back of the boat. These simple boats are sufficient to carry fishermen to and from the fishing grounds with full loads of fish.

== History ==
The roots, during the late 1980S and 1990s, government embarked on revamping the fishing sector. The sector now contributes immensely to the country’s economy. Many centuries ago, fish production was mainly by a few fisherfolk communities living by the lakesides who bartered fish for other food commodities. Fishing activities were characterized by the use of traditional gears such as spears, arrows, fish-pots, and the capture of fish by hand in shallow waters of lakes, rivers and swamps or fish poisoning with local herbs. However, these types of gears and methods still exist in minor lakes, the River Nile Basin and shallower areas of Lake Victoria. The fishing activity was relatively at a subsistence level. In the mid-1950s, foreign traders introduced Japanese nylon gillnets which proved more effective in the fishery than the cotton, hemp and flax gillnets. Nylon gillnets gave higher catchability characteristics than any other gears mainly because of higher tensile strength, mesh-size constancy, resistance to abrasion and durability of the nylon fibre material. The introduction of new fish species also boosted fish production. Fish production increased by six times in 30 years rising from 60,000 tons in 1961 to 245,000 tons in 1990 partly as a result of higher productivity of the lakes but also because of the increased catch effort. In 1983 when production was estimated at 78,000 tons p.a., potential production or Maximum sustainable yield (MSY) was estimated at 150,000 tons, yet by 1990 production had exceeded this level by 55,000 tons.

In all areas outside the central Lake Kyoga region, fish production increased throughout the 1980s. The Ugandan government supported several programs to augment fish production and processing. In 1987 a government-sponsored Integrated Fisheries Development Project established a boat construction and repair workshop at Jinja; a processing plant, several fish collecting centers, and fish marketing centers in several areas of Uganda. They also implemented the use of refrigerated insulated vehicles for transporting fish. China had managed the reconstruction of cold storage facilities in Kampala in the early 1980s. Soon after that, the government established the Sino-Uganda Fisheries Joint Venture Company to exploit fishing opportunities in Lake Victoria.

Uganda's Freshwater Fisheries Research Organization monitored fishing conditions and the balance of flora and fauna in Uganda's lakes. In 1989 this organization warned against overfishing, especially in the Lake Kyoga region, where the combined result of improved security conditions and economic hardship was a 40- percent increase in commercial and domestic fishing activity. A second environmental concern in the fishing industry was the weed infestation that had arisen in lakes suffering from heavy pollution. In late 1989, officials were relatively unsuccessful in restricting the types and levels of pollutants introduced into the nation's numerous lakes.

A few fishers used explosives obtained from stone quarries to increase their catch, especially in the Victoria Nile region near Jinja. Using byproducts from beer manufacturing to lure fish into a feeding area, they detonated small packs of explosives that killed large numbers of fish and other aquatic life. Several people drowned in the frantic effort to collect dead fish that floated to the surface of the water. Environmental and health concerns led the government to outlaw this form of fishing, and local officials were seeking ways to ban the sale of fish caught in this manner. Both bans were difficult to enforce, however; fishing with dynamite continued in 1989 despite the widespread notoriety attached to this activity.

== Economy of fishing in Uganda ==
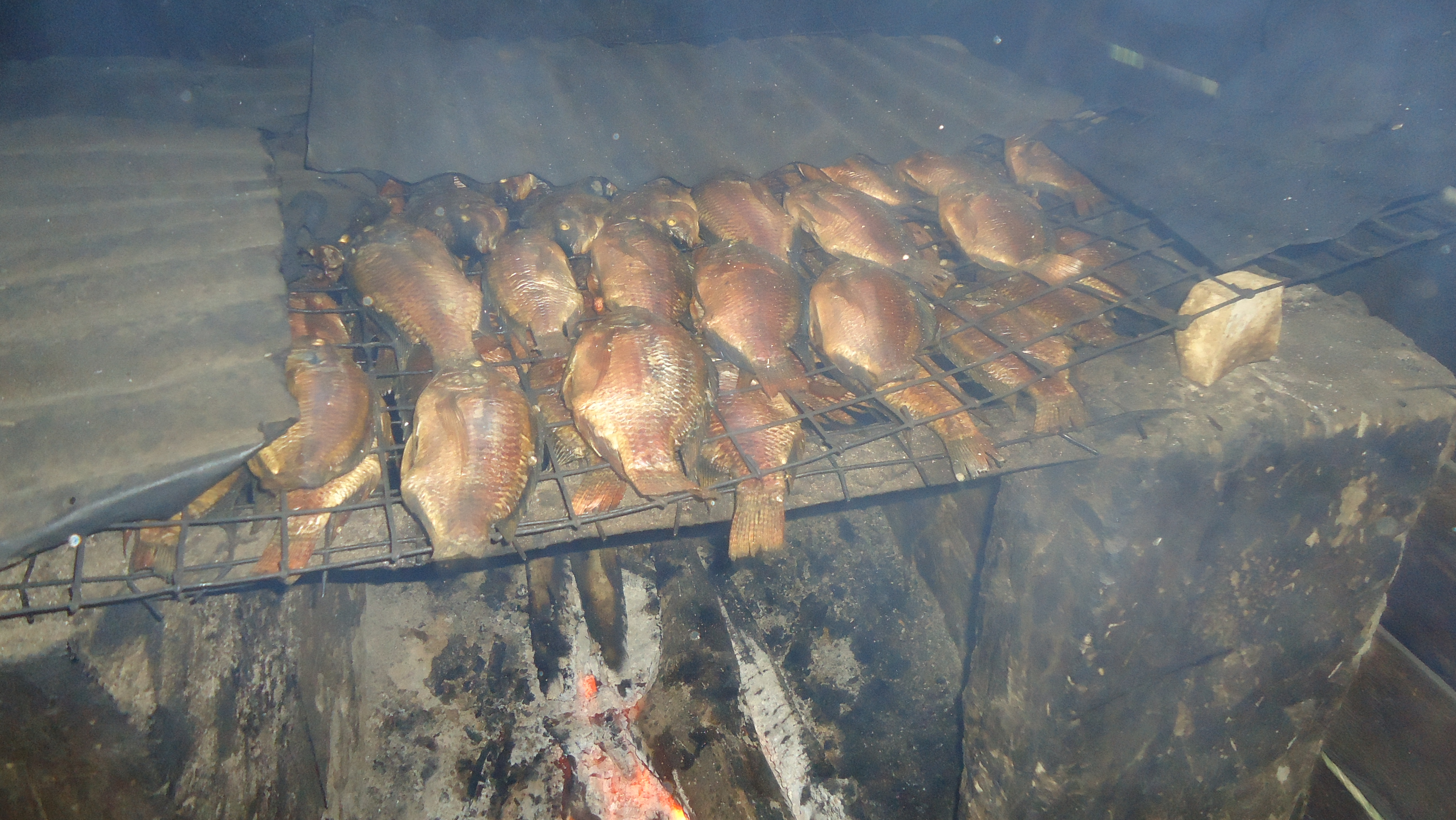
Smoking of fish in Kalangala

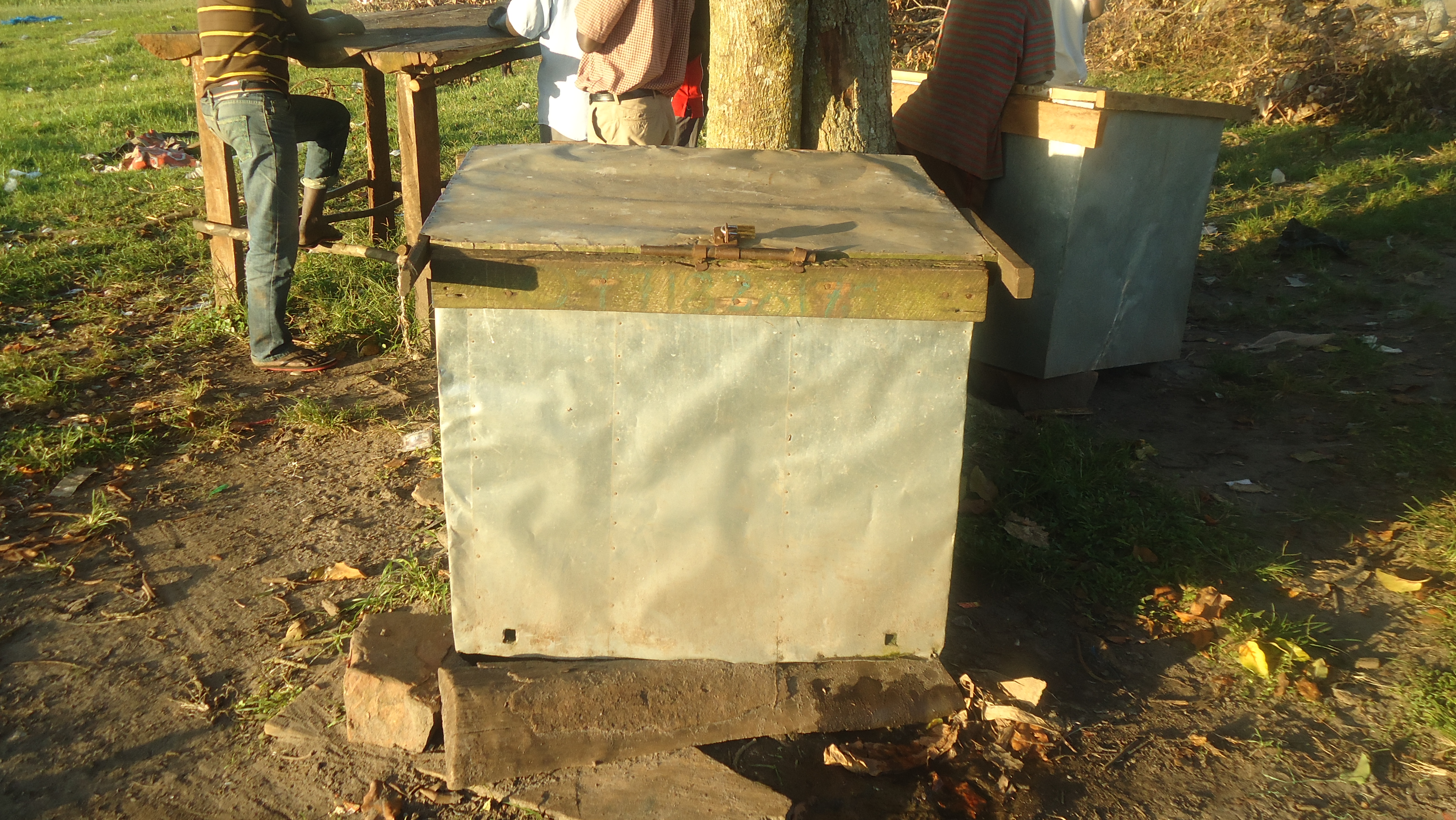
Ice container for fish storage in Kalangala

The Ugandan fisheries sector is important in terms of employment, poverty reduction and foreign exchange revenues. Fishing is one of the major economic activities. Lakes, rivers and swamps account for 44,000 km2 of Uganda's surface area of 241,000 km2. Fish activities are mainly carried out in open water sources and provide a livelihood to many people in Uganda. There are (2002) an estimated 250,000 artisan fishermen (136,000 on Lake Victoria), while nearly a million people (700,000 around Lake Victoria) benefit from fishery-related activities like local fish-processing, fish trade, boat-building, industrial fish-processing, netmaking, trade in fishing equipment, fisheries research, extension services and administration.

== Aquaculture ==
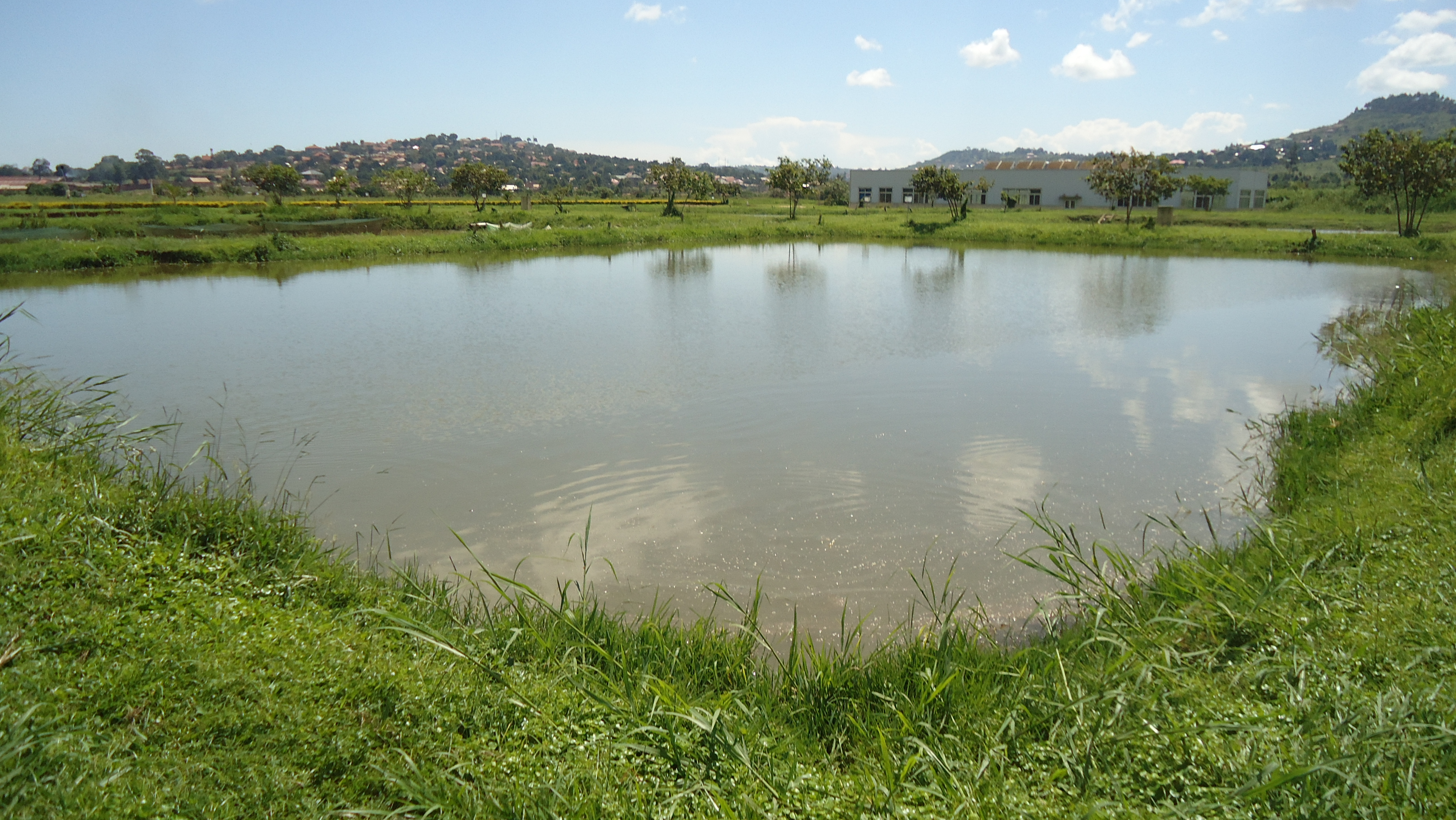
a fish pond in kajjansi

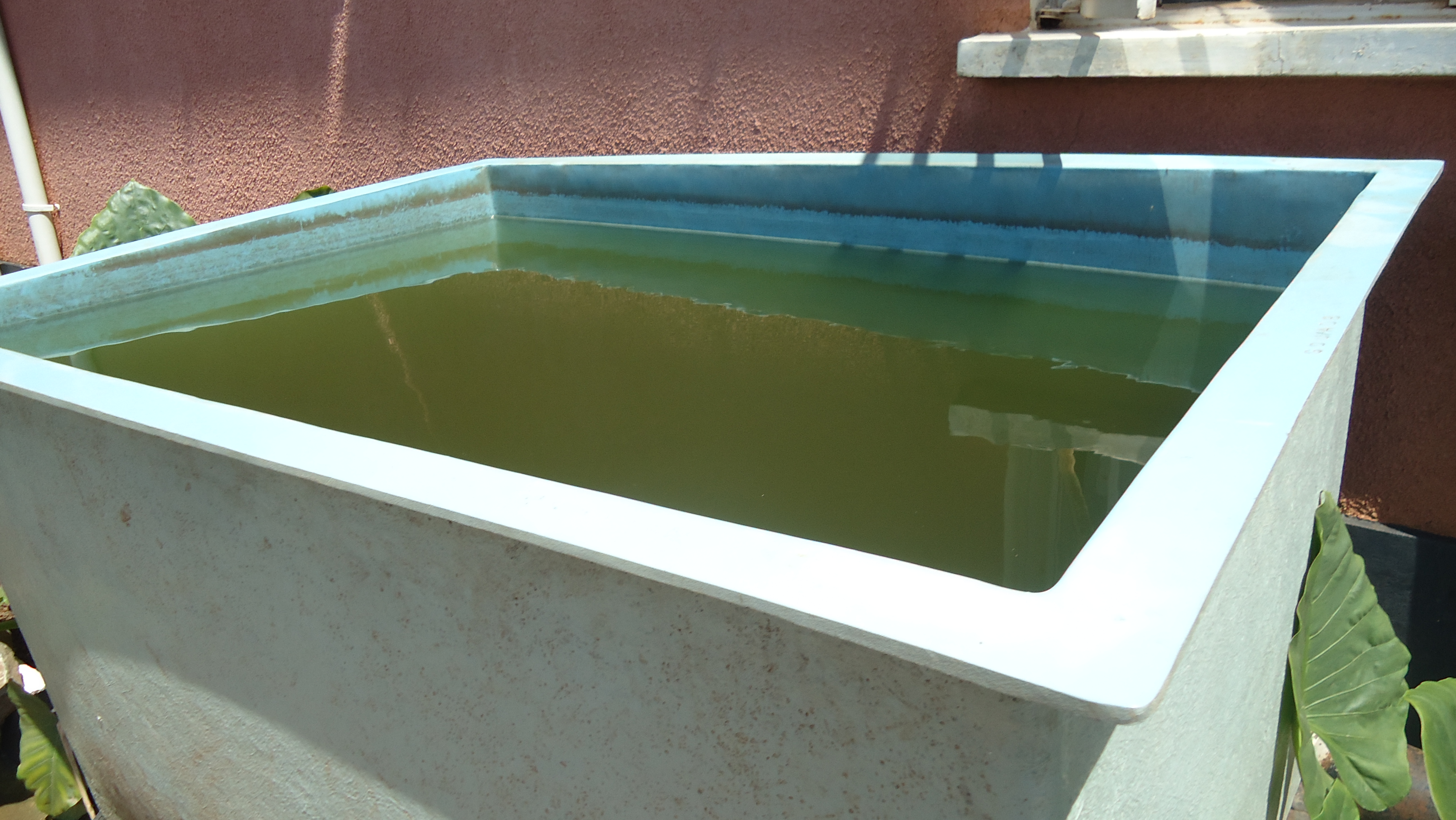
Tank used for breading fish Aquaculture Research and Development Centre, Kajjansi

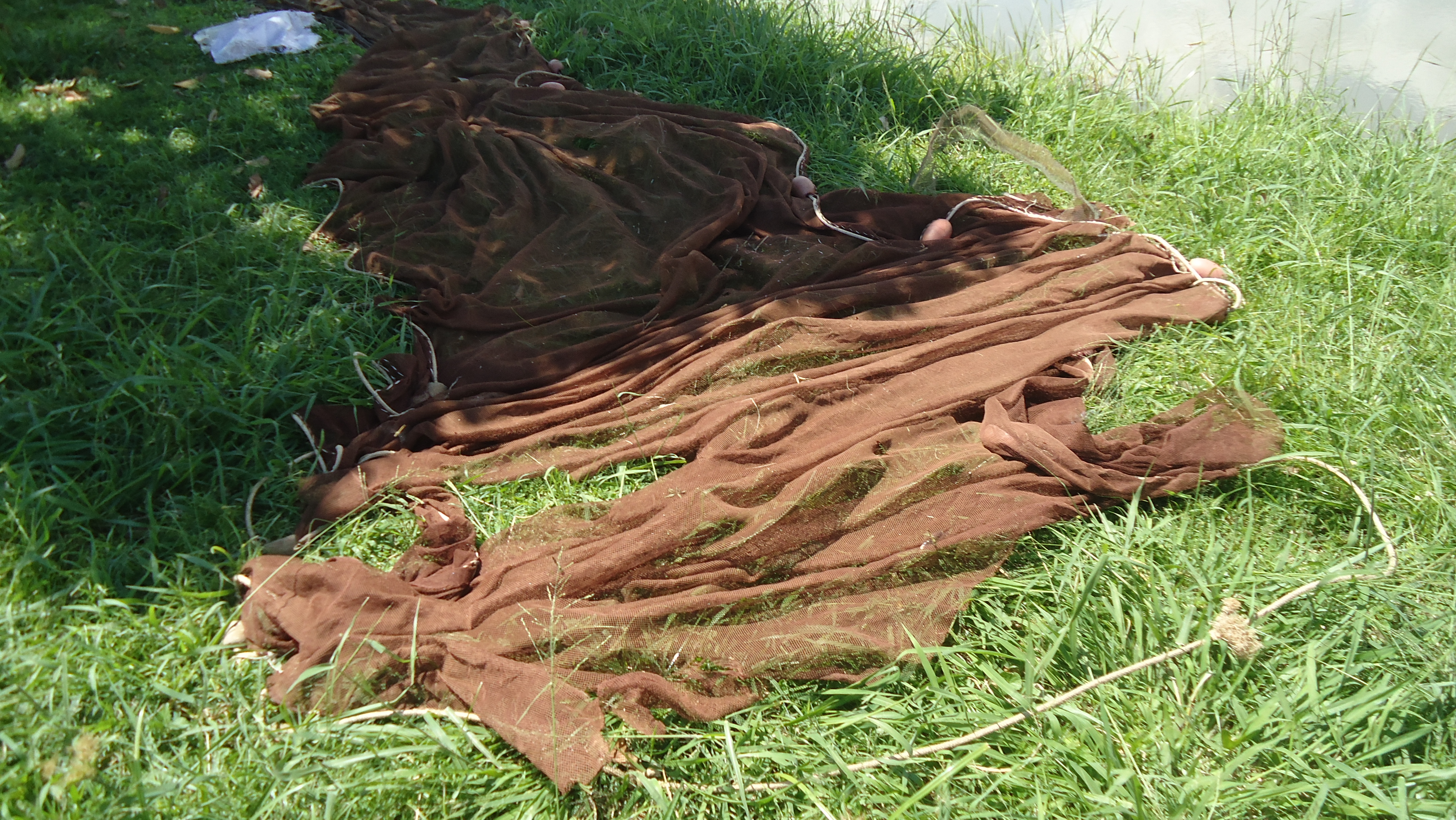
Fish nets used at Aquaculture Research and Development Centre, Kajjansi

Aquaculture in Uganda is recorded to have started in 1941 after carp was imported into the country. Fish farming was officially proposed by the colonial authorities and the Kajjansi Fish Experimental Station established in 1947. However, the introduction of carp was embroiled in controversies due to differences among the lead scientists on the possible adverse impact of common carp on the indigenous aquatic environment in case they escaped from the confines of the fishponds. Because of this, it was decided to use tilapia for stocking purposes. A vigorous fish farming extension programme resulted in the construction of 1 500 ponds by 1956; these were concentrated in the central region (Buganda) and the most southwestern part of the country (Kigezi). In 1959–60 an FAO-supported comparative evaluation of carp and tilapia endorsed the use of carp and resulted in further expansion of aquaculture in Uganda. Aquaculture was further promoted under the drive for rural development, and by late 1968 the Department of Fisheries recorded up to 11 000 pounds mostly producing fish for subsistence. However, subsistence farming was largely based on the supply of seed from farmer to farmer and/or from the government station, which hampered the expansion of the aquaculture sub-sector. Changing policies under successive governments also led to uneven support and many farmers abandoned ponds due to lack of stocking materials, limited technical guidance and excessive government regulatory regimes. The Fisheries Master Plan study of 1999 established that Uganda had only 4 500 functioning ponds with only a portion stocked, producing 285 tonnes of fish annually.

With the government's strategic intervention and support from development partners such as FAO, aquaculture has picked up once again reaching 15,000 tonnes of fish currently (2005) produced from 20,000 ponds of an average size of 500 m^{2}. Due to the limited availability of fish seed, carp has fallen out of favour, and North African catfish, along with Nile tilapia, has taken its place. Although fish farming in Uganda has so far been pond- and subsistence-based, the growing interest in commercial aquaculture is providing an impetus towards cage-culture based aquaculture.

Pond culture is the most common system in the country. Other forms of fish culture such as cage culture are only starting to be discussed especially by the emerging commercial fish farmers. Previously farmers, 99 percent of whom were subsistence fish farmers, had ponds ranging anywhere from 50 m^{2} to 200 m^{2}. The majority (an estimated 60 percent) remain at a subsistence level of production with little or no technical inputs or management. With the drive to commercialise aquaculture, production efforts to increase the pond surface have resulted in a current average of 500 m^{2} per pond. Farmers at this level have adopted the use of inputs such as quality fish seed and feed. The feed, however, is still usually made on-farm using formulae provided by the Aquaculture Research and Development Centre, Kajjansi.

Until recently, most fish farmers in Uganda were poor people in villages who practiced aquaculture for subsistence with ponds of usually less than 500 m^{2} constructed using family labour. These are low or no input production systems, with little or no need for routine management. Those who have had some training in the management of ponds usually fertilize their ponds with either chicken droppings or cow dung and any other organic house waste. Production is usually in the range of 5 kg to 10 kg/100 m^{2} (i.e. 500 kg to 1,000 kg per hectare) per annum. The number of ponds at this level is estimated at 11,000 to 15,000 pounds with nearly 80 percent currently active. These 11,000 to 15,000 ponds are of an average size of 200 m^{2} and are owned by an estimated 8,000 farmers.

== Types of fish in Uganda ==
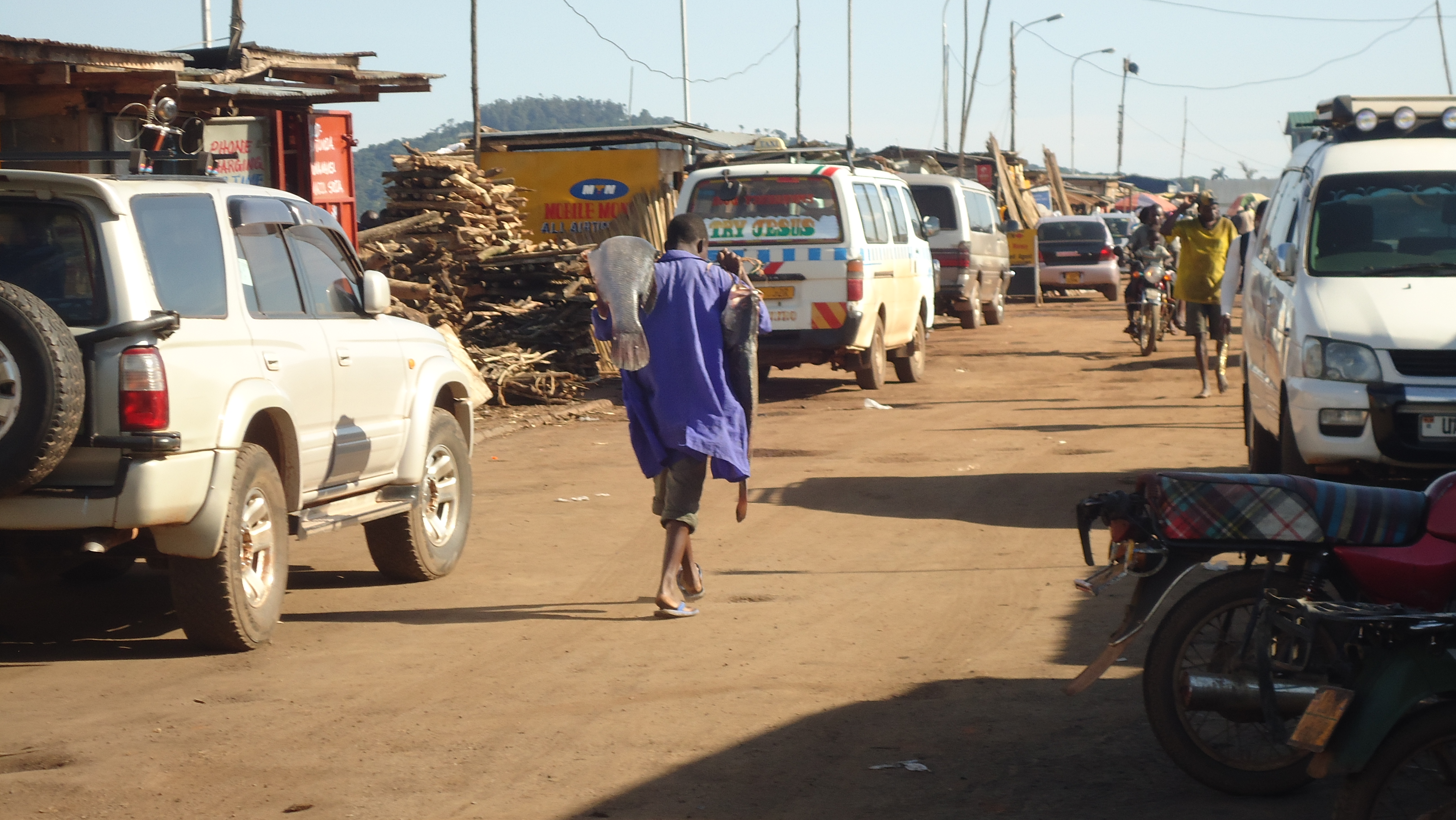
A fisher man with Nile perch at Gaba landing site

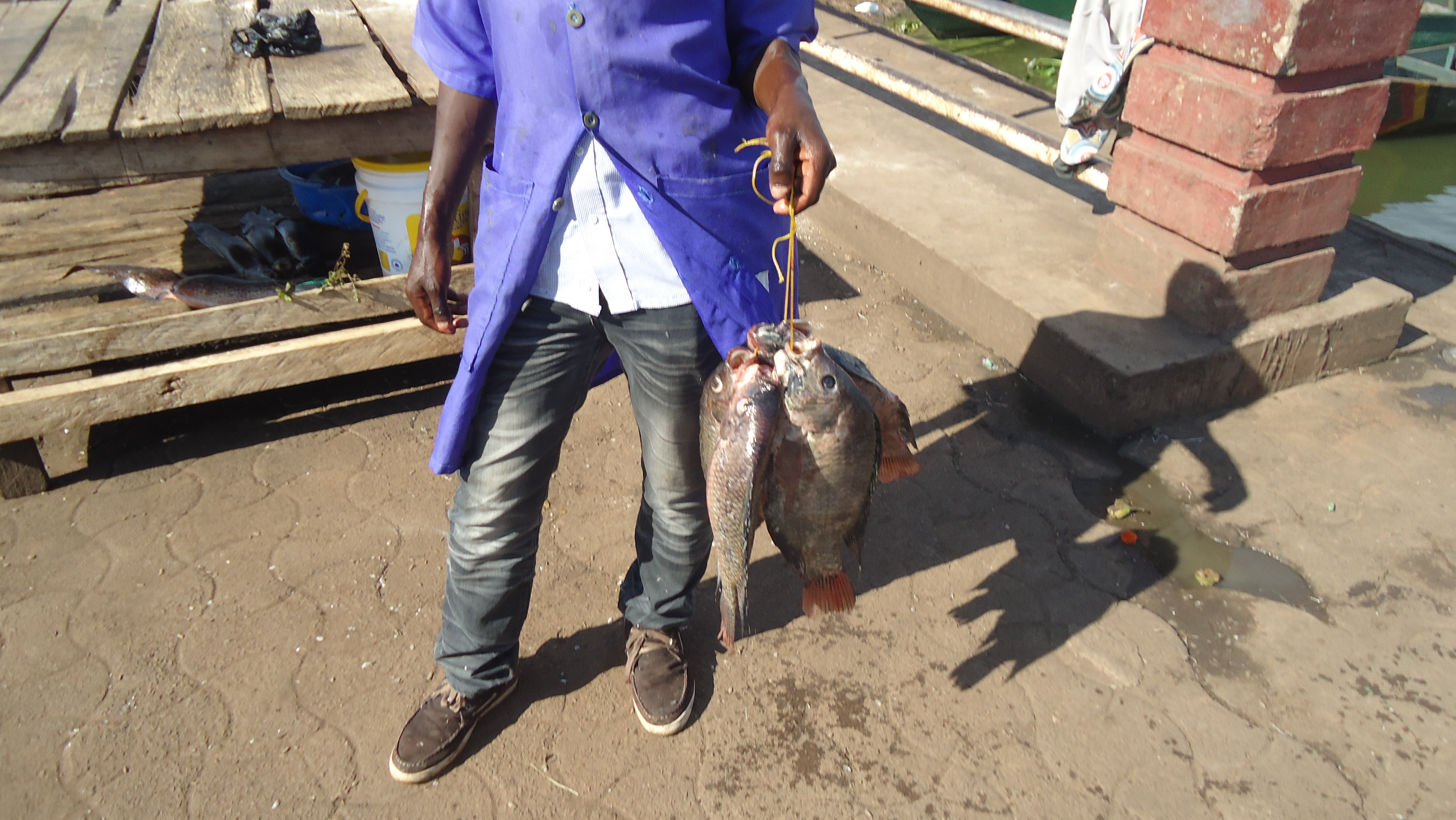
A fisher man with tilapia at Gaba landing site

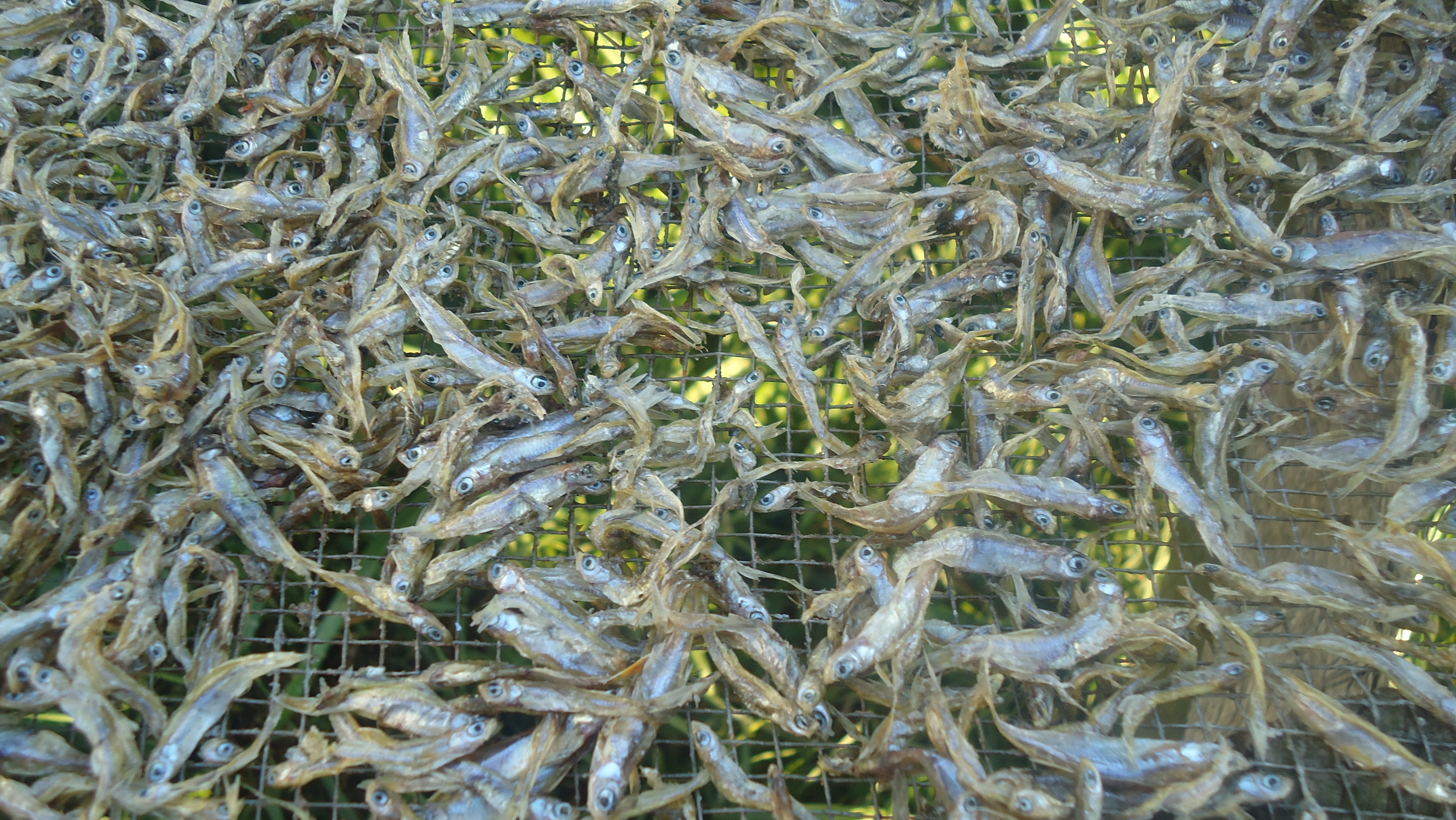
Silver fish in Kalangala

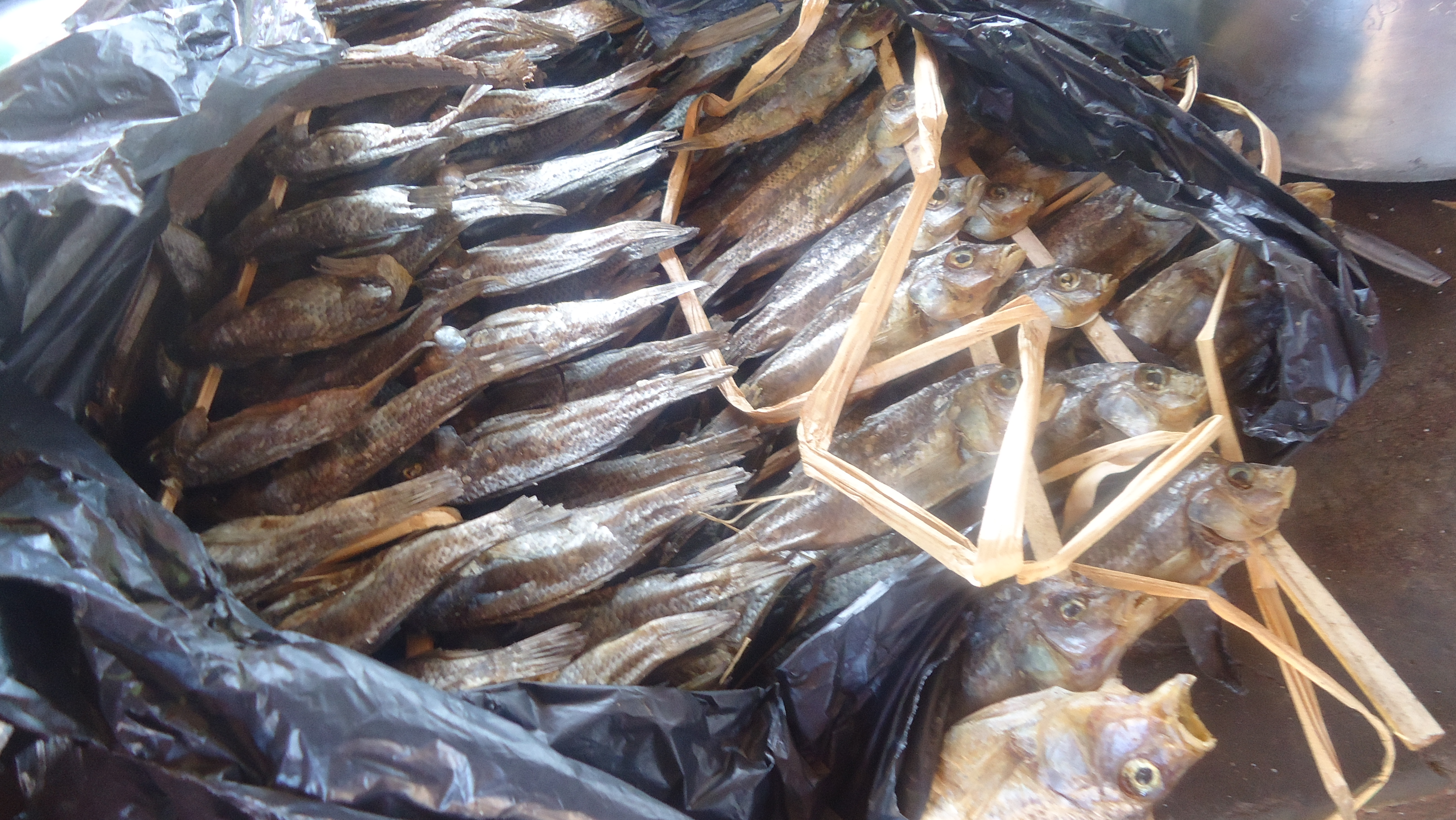
Sprat in a market in kalangala

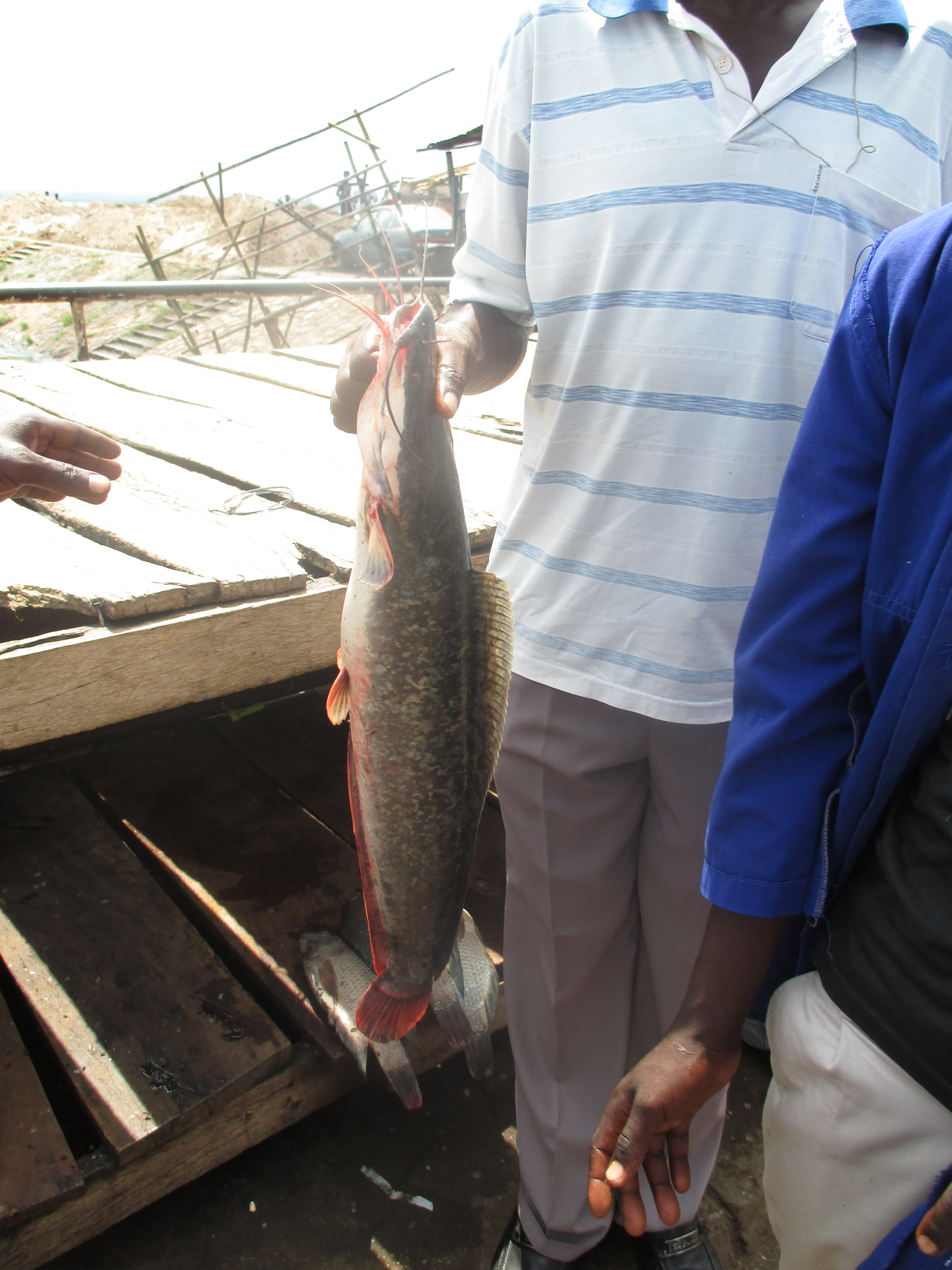
A fisherman holding Clarias at Gaba landing site

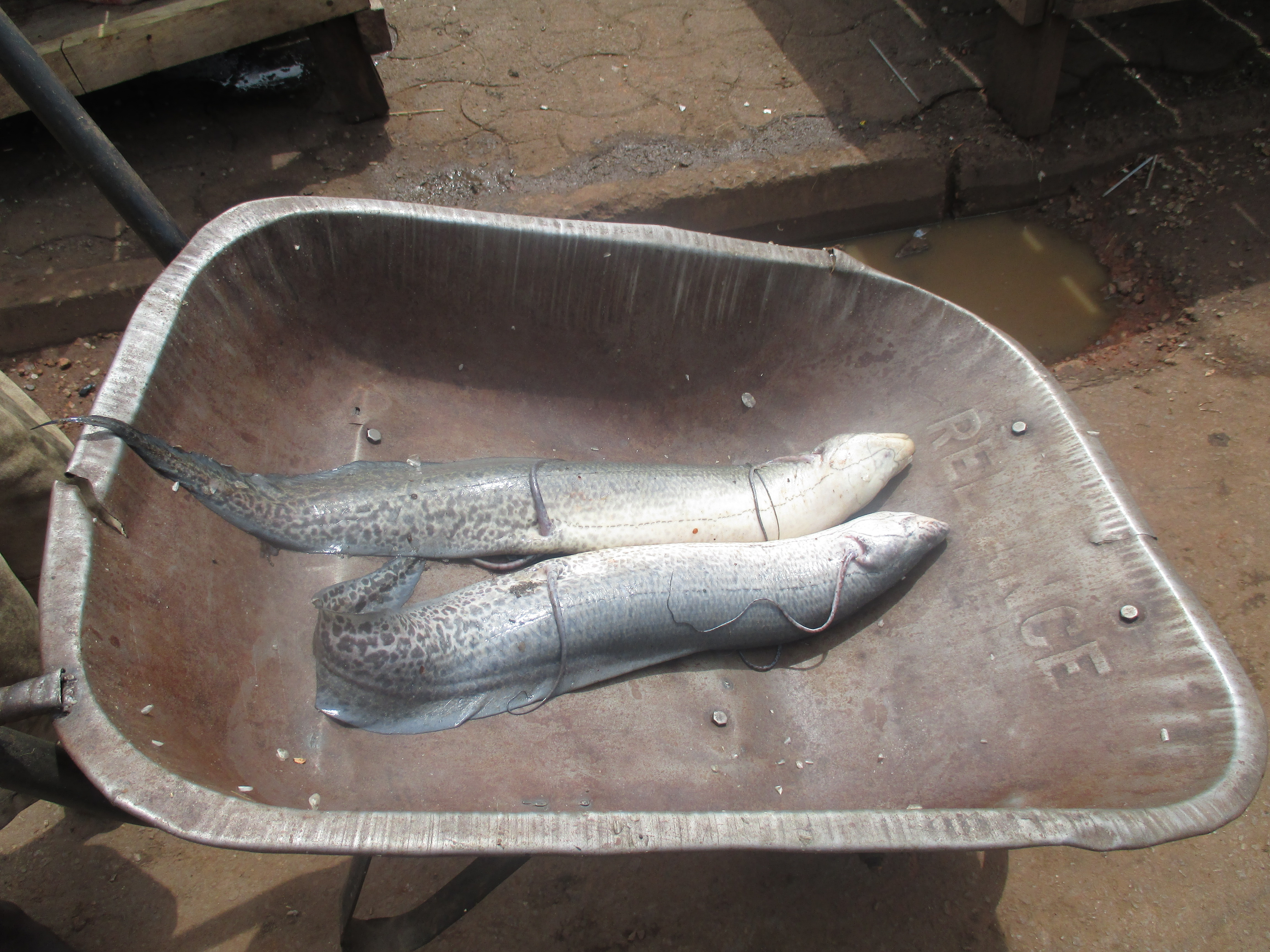
Lung fish at Gaba

The waters of Uganda contain an impressive array of fish species—over 90 in all. This count does not include the Haplochromis complex, which itself is made up of more than 200 species. Fish that are the target of most commercial and subsistence exploitation include species of Lates (Nile perch), Oreochromis (Nile tilapia), the herring-like Alestes, the catfishes Bagrus and Clarias, Hydrocynus (Tiger fish), the small pelagic "sardine" Rastrineobola, Protopterus (lungfish), and the haplochromines. The commonest fish types in Uganda include:

- Nile perch locally known as "Empuuta"
- Singidia tilapia locally known as "Engege"
- Nile tilapia
- Catfish locally known as "Emmale"
- Silver fish (fish) locally known as "Mukene"
- Lungfish locally known as "Emmamba"
- Eels locally known as "Ensonzi"
- Sprat locally known as "Enkejje"
- Clarias locally known as "Emalle"

== Fishing gear and methods used in Uganda ==
Capture fisheries in Uganda are characterized by plank canoes and to a lesser extent, fibreglass boats. Some dugout canoes are also still being used. The plank canoes are generally 4 to 12 m in length and dugout canoes average 3.5 m. The total number of vessels is about 17,000 and about 20% of these are motorised. Artisanal fishermen utilise various gears including gillnets, seines and hook and line. In a number of localities, traditional methods including baskets, traps and mosquito nets continue to be used. The gears commonly used include gill nets, lift-nets, scoop-nets used in light fishing; hook and line gear (hand-lines, fishing rods or tackles) and fish traps.

=== Gillnet ===
Gillnets are currently a major and popular fishing gear widely used for fish capture in the major and minor water bodies. They are normally set at dusk and hauled in at dawn. Drift gillnetting is commonly practised on Lake Albert, but rarely on other water bodies. The target fish species for the gill net fishery are Nile Perch, Tilapia species, Bagrus, Clarias, Protopterus, Alestes, Hydrocynus and many other demersal species.

Fish nets have different sizes. The small sized nets are used for fishing small fish while the big sized nets are used for fishing large fish. For instance, half inch up to one inch grade nets are used for fishing Nkejje, one inch up to 6 inch grade for fishing tilapia, and above 6 inch for Nile perch. The fishermen use boats to haul the nest. The bigger the boat, the larger the volume of fish. One net can weigh up to 10 kg, without fish. A small boat may not be able to handle such a load.

=== Longline ===
The method developed in the 1980s for the effective exploitation of predatory fish e.g. Lates niloticus, Protopterus, Clarias, Bagrus, etc. A typical gear comprises a long length of a mainline (100–300 m), rigged with monofilament twine (diameter 1.00-2.00 mm) or multi-filament twine (ply 36–60) and bears short snoods (0.3-0.8 m) carrying baited fishhooks. A longline is prepared for setting in the morning or afternoon by a crew or hired men (1-2). Hooks are baited with natural baits (e.g. small live fish, slices of meat, earthworms and insects). The gear is set late in the afternoon in a predetermined fishing ground and left to fish passively overnight. Hauling is normally done early next morning the quality of fish harvested by this method is usually good.

=== Angling Gear ===
Handline (the simplest and cheapest gear) is manually operated by one person along the lake beaches or on the riverbanks. Effective angling is done in calm waters early in the morning or evening or on dark nights. A set of handlines can also be operated as a trolling gear. This is a prospective commercial fishery on Lake Victoria, Kyoga and Albert, targeting predacious species like Nile Perch and Hydrocynus. A fishing rod or tackle is mechanically operated by one man using a reel fixed on a springy plastic rod. Its mainline is baited with a fish lure. Angling for Lates niloticus on Lake Victoria or for Trout on River Sipi in Kapchorwa District is a lucrative activity particularly for the foreign tourists who adopt this fishing method. This method may use live bait and the catching of bait (immature fish) using small mesh-sized gillnets; seine-nets and fish-trap can be detrimental to the fishery.

=== Fish-traps, baskets and weirs ===
Various designs of fish traps, baskets and weirs are used in fishery. Conical traps are used most commonly for catching fish species e.g. Clarias, Barbus, Schilbe in marshy shallow waters of lakes, rivers and in permanent and seasonal swamps. These are particularly used on River Nile, Lake Kyoga, swamps and other minor lakes. The gear is strategically set as a barrier and fish voluntarily or involuntarily enter it, but their escape is hindered by a special non-return valve or device. Traps set in the river estuaries and papyrus fringes indiscriminately trap fish (Barbus, Alestes, Clarias, Hydrocyrus, Protopterus, Labeo) of all sizes and ages.

=== Fishing Gear for Rastrineobola argentea (silver fish) Fishery ===
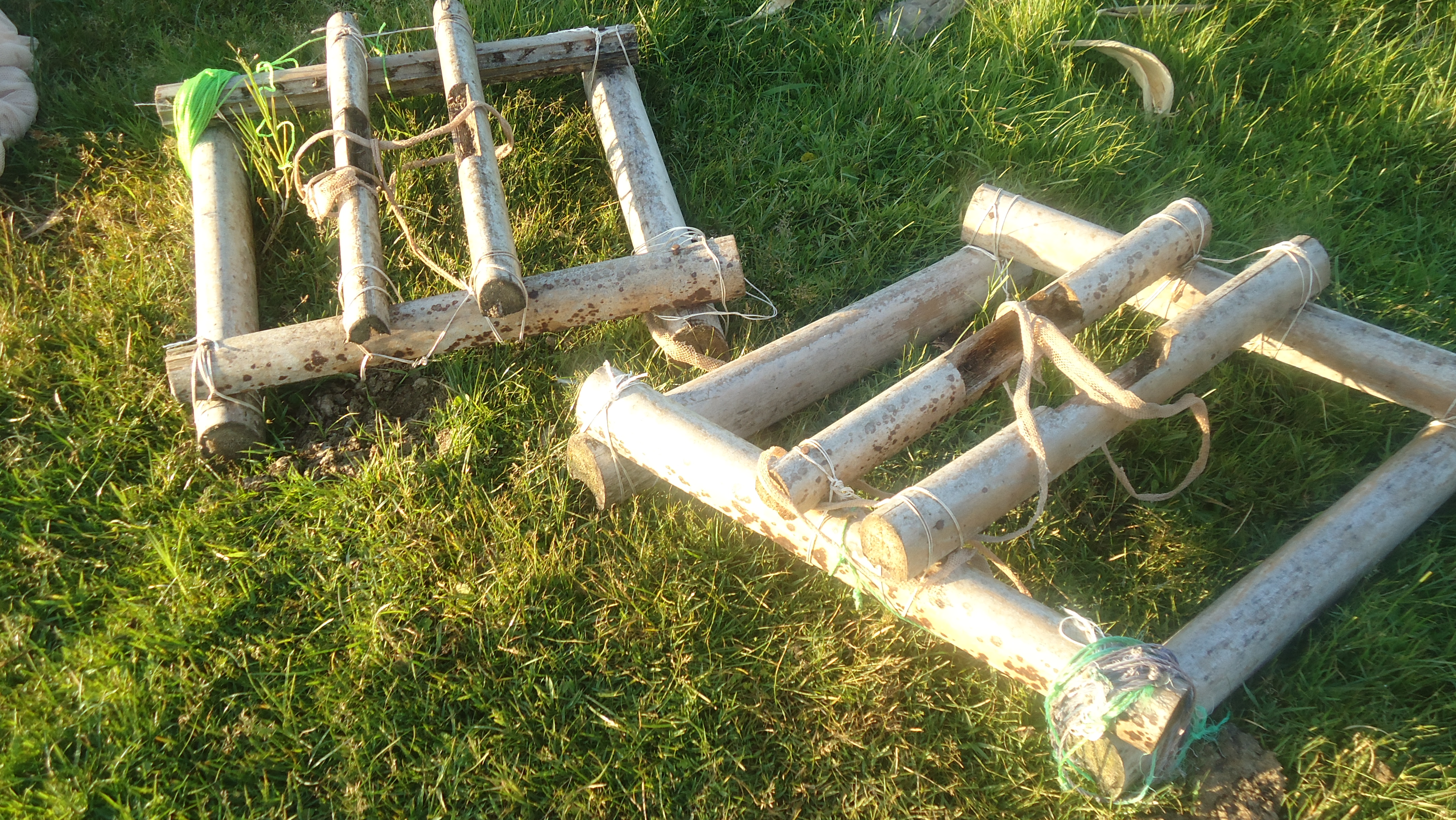
Steamer Lamp stand known as Kengere in Kalangala

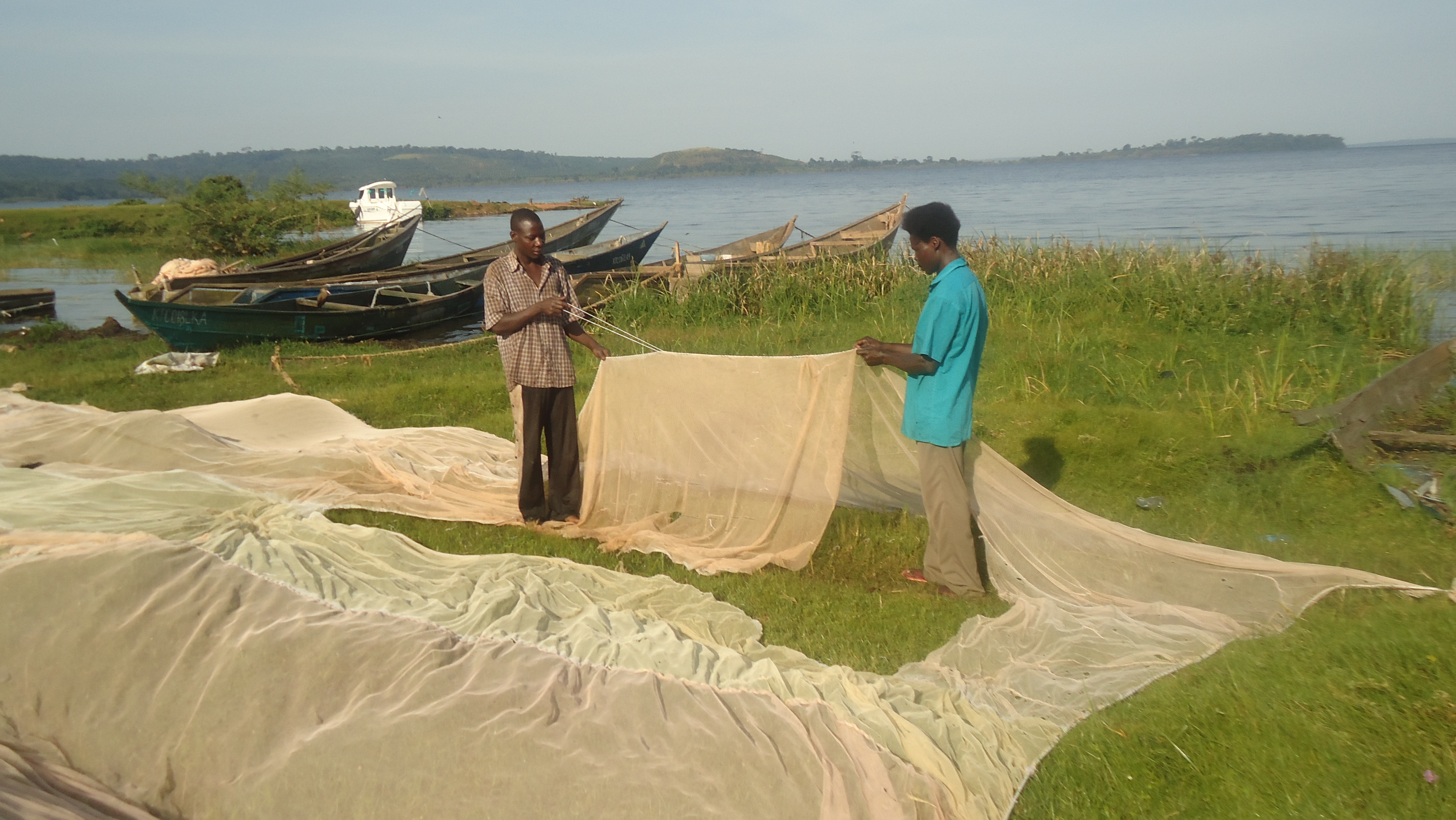
Fishermen repairing nets for silver fish on Lutoboka landing site kalangala

Silver fish is fished at night when there is no moon. The fishermen leave at 5:00 pm and return at 6:00 am or 7:00 am. Parafin Steamer lamps placed on rafts called "Lago" are used to trap the fish. A fish net ranging from 5-10mm is used. It is often 40 feet long with eight to fourteen sections, called "golofa". The fishermen use six lamps when using such a net. This a change from the practice long ago when the fisherman used one lamp and a much smaller net called "Kyota". The fishermen nicknamed the fishing of silverfish in the middle of the lake, Hurr up. But silverfish is also fished on the shore in Buvuma district. This is mostly done by Women. The net they use has six sections. This kind of silverfish is called, silverfish of the shore, Mukene owokutaka.

Lamps are attached to the front of a canoe and others on small rafts. These rafts keep the lamps floating. The net is lowered into the water. A big school of fish is attracted to the light and trapped in the net. In another instance, lamps are set in a straight line (about 200 m long) by connecting the rafts with ropes (at intervals of about 15 m) and positioning them perpendicular to the shoreline. A fish school is attracted by light and eventually concentrated around the light. The lights are hauled in slowly until they are grouped together close to the shore. One lamp is attached to the canoe so that the lamps on the rafts can be placed in the canoe before scooping without losing the catch.

In some areas, a pair of canoes joined together by planks forming "a catamaran" is used to fish silverfish. A kerosene paraffin lamp, attached to the middle of one of the planks, is lit. Another lamp mounted on a small raft connected to the canoe by a rope of about 15 m long, is also lit and slowly pulled towards the canoe. This attracts the fish to the net. The fish are trapped in the net and the lights extinguished.

=== Fishery by Perforated Plastic Basins ===
Perforated basins are extensively used mainly for Alestes nurse fishery on Lake Albert. This is an emerging fishery on this lake. These basins are operated waters. Bait in form of dregs of native beer or cassava flour is splattered in water above immersed basins; fish is attracted to feed on bait and is scooped out.

=== Hooks ===
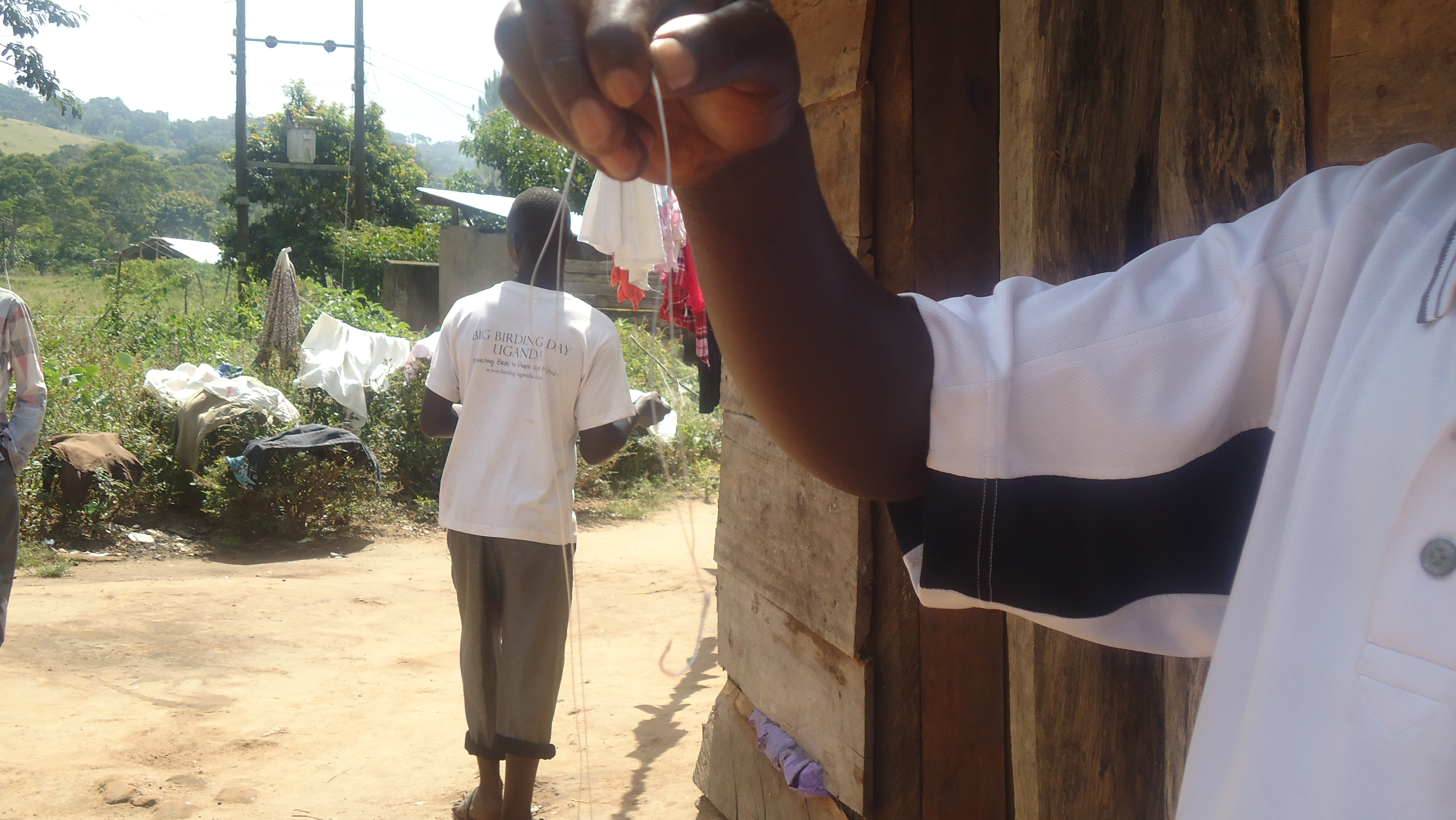
A fisherman holding a hook for fishing Nile perch in Kalangala

Hooks are used for fishing but on a small scale. The size of the hook used depends on the type of fish. Hooks have numbers. The lower the number, the bigger the hook. Hooks used for tilapia are from numbers eleven to sixteen. Those for Nile perch are from seven to 10. Lung fish are fished with hooks of numbers six and five. Bigger hooks are used for bigger fish so that they do not break free and swim away. On Lutoboka landing site on Bugala Island in Kalangala District, fishermen use hooks of number 12 to fish Nile perch. 1000 hooks are put in water. Sprat is put on the hook as bait. The hooks are put 5 meters apart. Not all of them get fish. Some times the fishermen get 10 to twenty fish of different sizes. The hooks are kept in a wooden chest.

== Fishing sites and villages/communities in Uganda ==
Fishing activities in Uganda take place mostly on islands and on landing sites. These act as central points for fish trade and fishing.

=== Landing sites ===
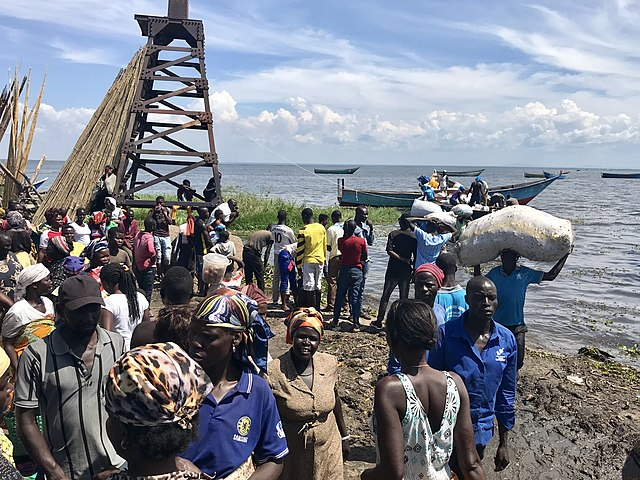
Fishing activities at one of the lakes in Uganda

Most activities of the fish trade take place at landing sites that act as both collection and trading centres for fish. The major fresh water sources have several landing sites that act as centres for fishing activities. Lake Victoria has: Kasensero and Kyabasimba landing sites in Rakai District, Kasenyi and Kigungu in Wakiso District, Katosi and Ssenyi in Mukono District, Masese and Wairaka in Jinja District, and Gaba in Kampala district. The landing sites on Lake Kyoga include: kayago and Namasale in Lira District and Kikaraganya, Kikarangenye and Lwampanga in Nakasongola District. Landing sites on Lake Albert include: Abok and Dei in Nebbi District and Kabolwa and Wanseko in Masindi District. Landing sites on Lake Edward and Lake George include: Kasaka and Katunguru in Bushenyi District and Katwe and Kayanja in Kasese District.

==== Ggaba landing site ====
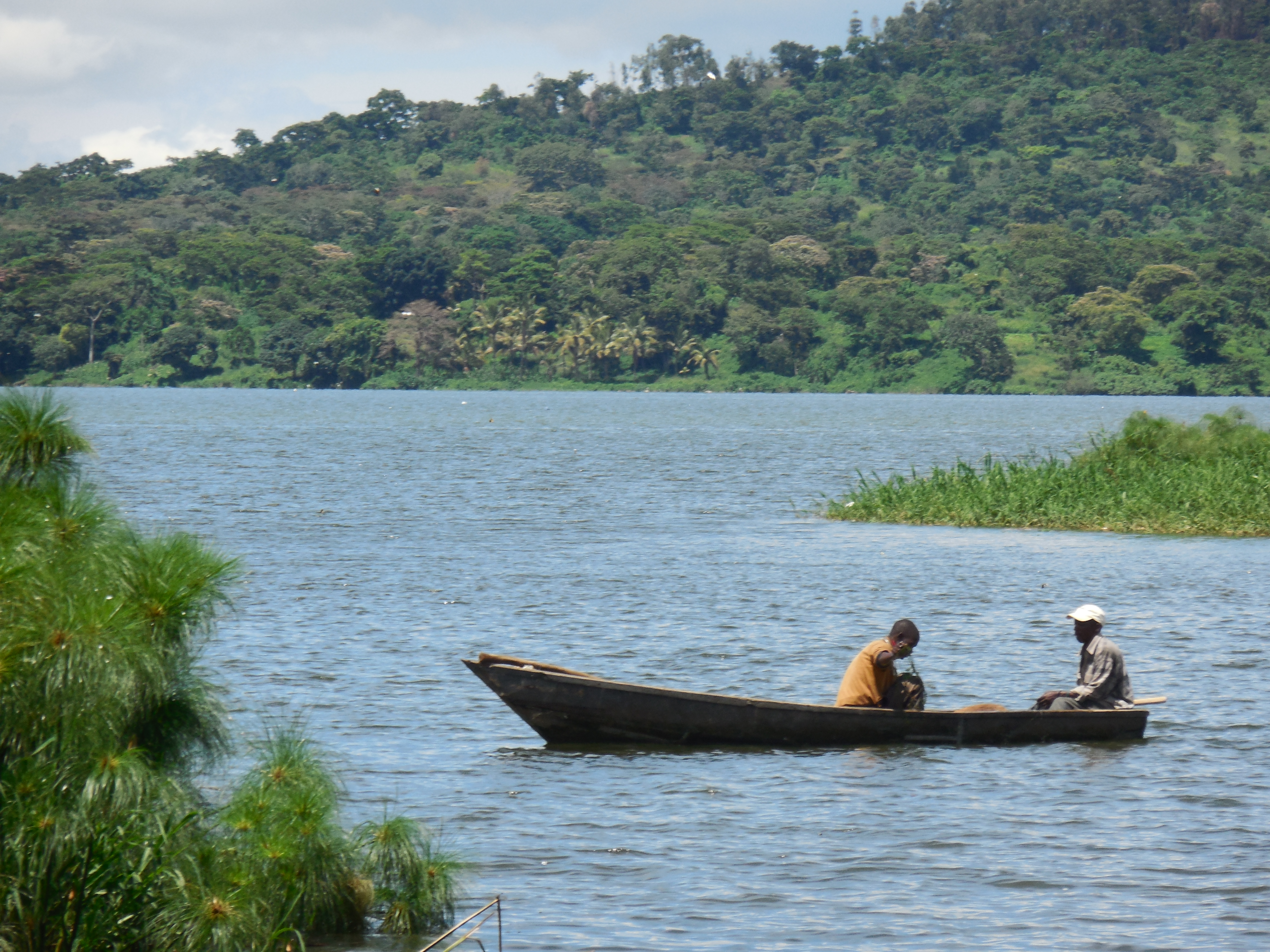
Fishermen on Lake Victoria ready to catch fish.

The Ggaba landing site is found on Lake Victoria in Kampala. It is used as a centre for fish trade. Fishermen set off from the site and return with fish to sell. The fish mostly caught in the waters near the site include: Nile perch, Tilapia, Lung fish and Cat fish. Fishing is mostly done in the middle of the lake, a little distance from the site. It is tilapia that is fished near the shore. Fishing has changed at the site over the years, from using small canoes to using motorised boats. The mode of transportation of fish has also improved. The fish are moved in containers with ice, unlike before when they were simply dropped inside a boat and then delivered.

==== Lutoboka landing site ====
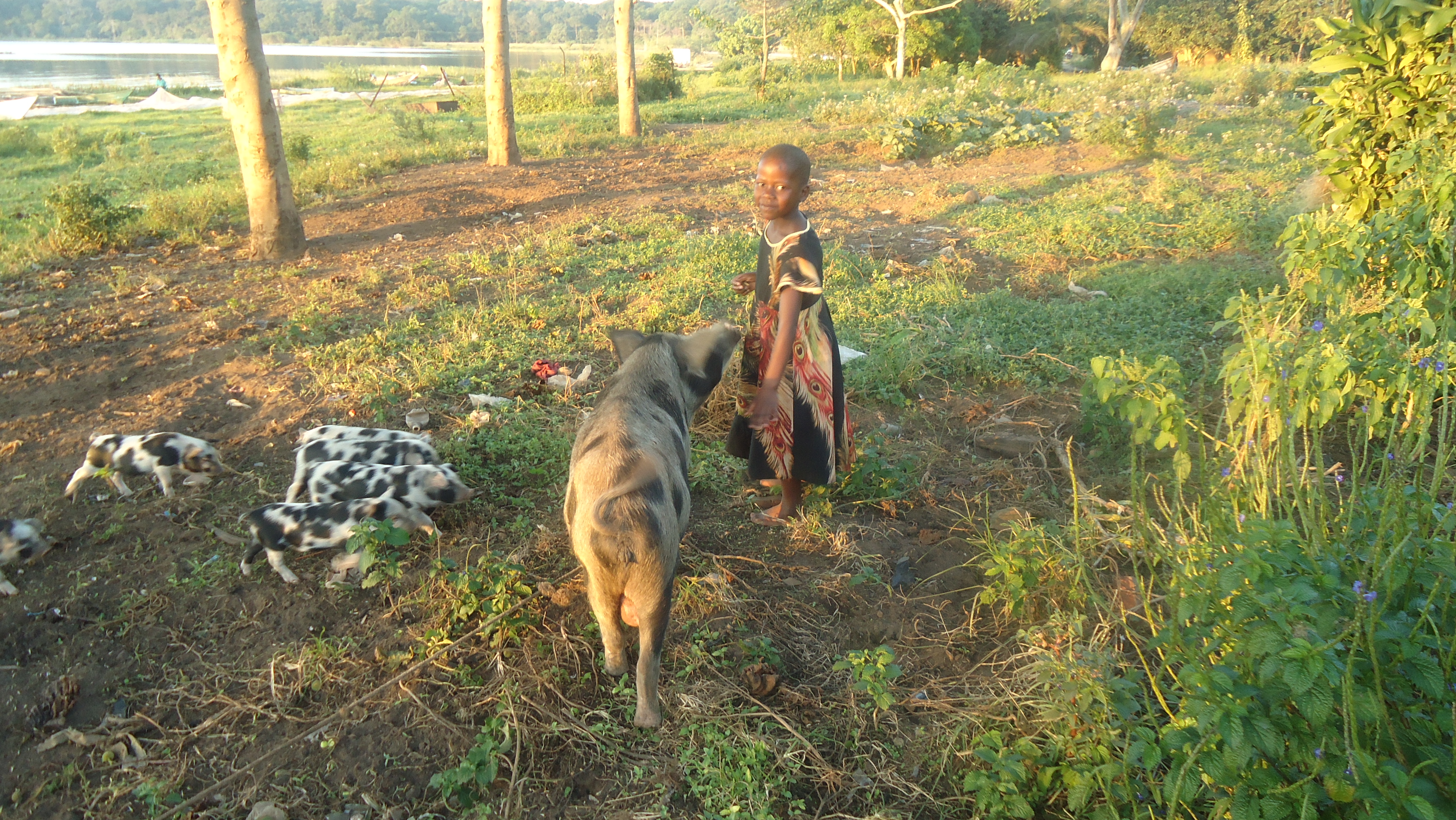
A fisherma's daughter with pigs in Kalangala

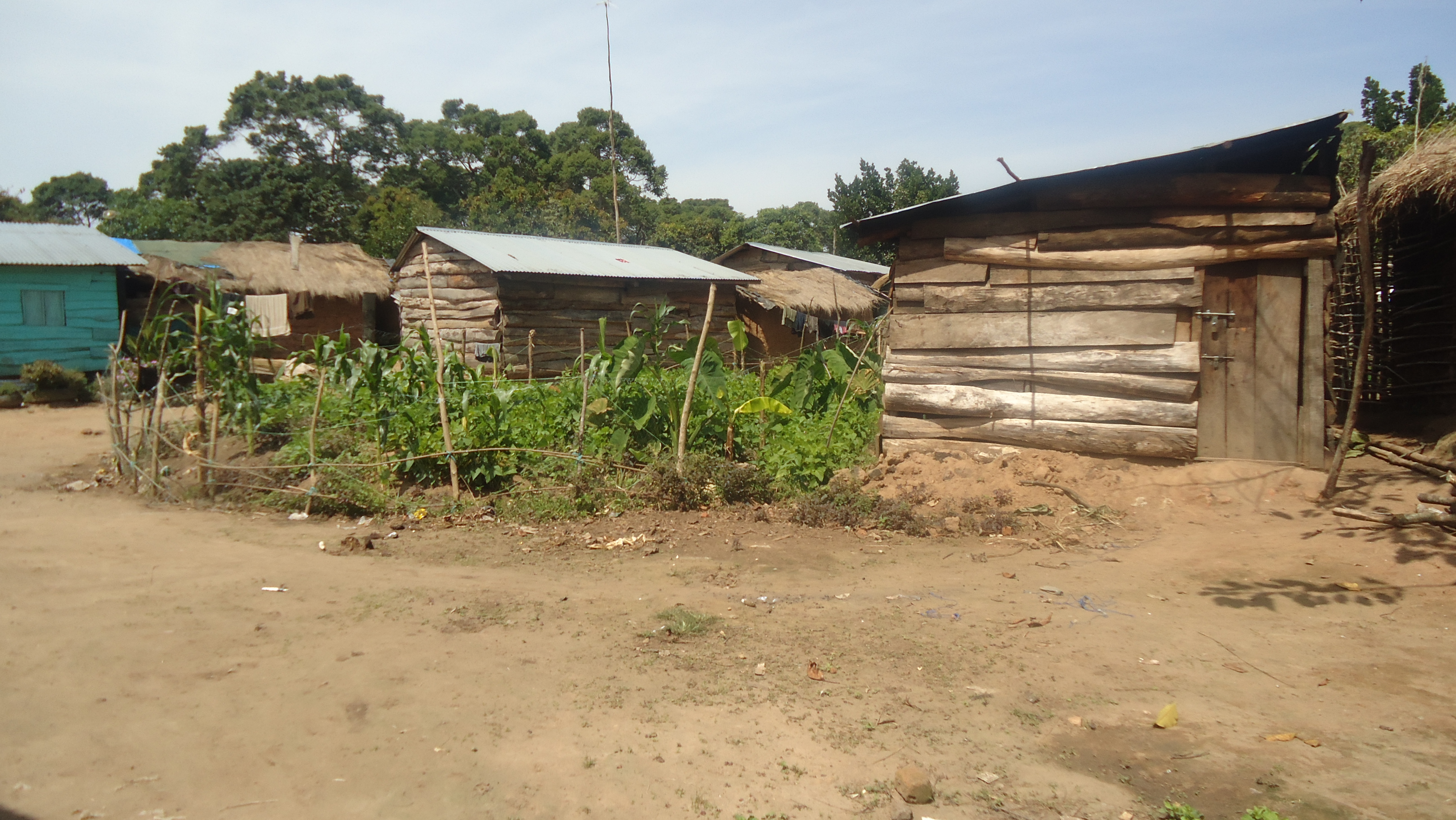
A garden on Lutoboka landing site in Kalangala

Lutoboka landing site is found on Lake Victoria, in Kalangala District, on Bugala Island. It is a tourist destination with hotels and resorts. The fish mostly caught at the site include: Nile perch, Tilapia, sprat and silverfish. Most fishermen engage in the fishing of silverfish, tilapia and Nile perch. Fisjh preservation at the site is down though fish smoking and steel cases. The fishermen usually fish at night. They leave in the evening and return in the morning. Fishermen engage in farming and animal rearing to supplement incomes from fish.

=== Islands ===
In Uganda, fishing is most widely done on a large scale in the Ssese Islands, a group of 84 islands. The biggest and most active of these is Bugala Island in Kalangala District, and Koome Island in Mukono District. Fishing is the principal economic activity on these islands.

=== Lake victoria fish communities ===
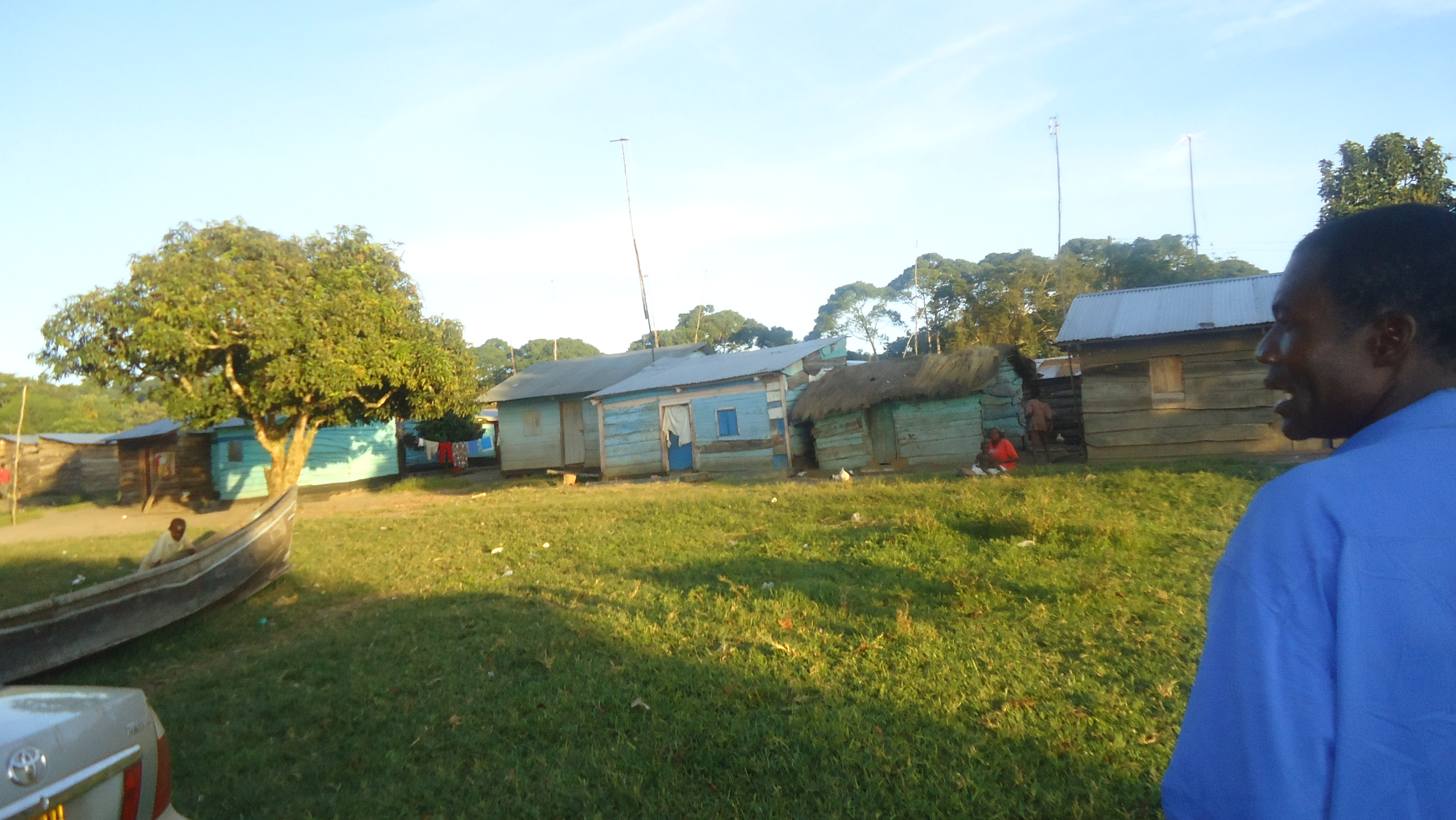
A fishing Village on Lutoboka landing site

Males dominate the fisheries (98 percent). The mean age of fishers is 29 years with 30 years age dominating. The majority of fishers are married (70 percent) and have families (74 percent). Most fishermen have stayed on landing sites for close to nine years. The fishermen are of varied ethnic backgrounds with Baganda making 49 percent, the Samia 14 percent, Basoga 9 percent, with Alur, Itesot, Bakenye, Bagwere, Adhola, Banyankole, Banyarwanda, Jaluo, and Banyala constituting the rest.

Youthful men do the fishing while the women are involved in fish drying (sardines), traditional processing of fish and cooking. People who do not go fishing themselves but hire to catch fish, own most fishing units. The involvement of family is less. The other groups involved in fishing include fish traders, boat owners and fish smokers.

== See also ==
- Economy of Uganda
- Agriculture in Uganda
- Fishing on Lake Victoria
- Lake Victoria Fisheries Organization
