= Aquaculture Research and Development Centre, Kajjansi =

Ugandan research organization

Coordinates: 0.2220°N 32.5346°E

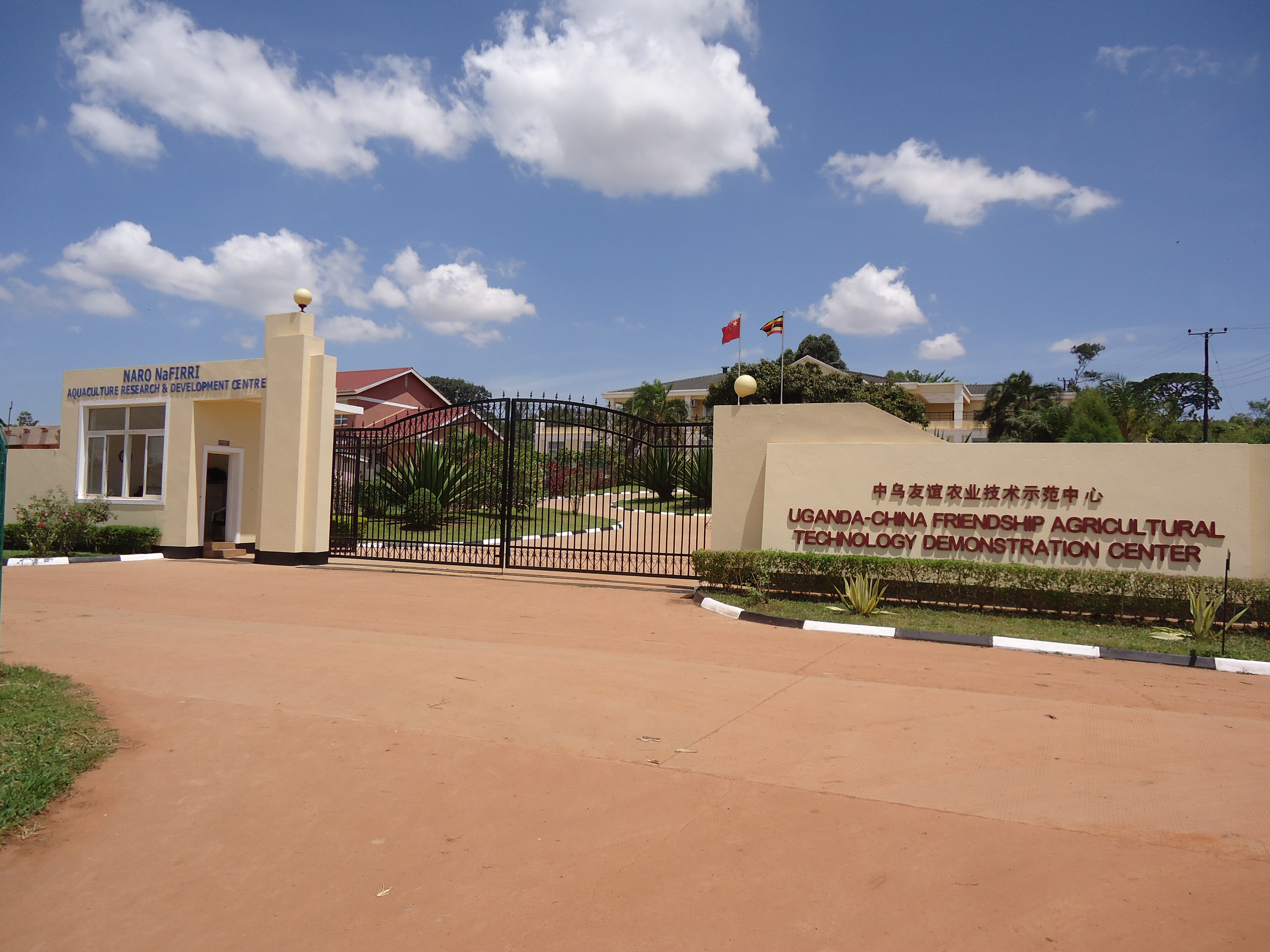
- Location: Uganda
- Website: www.firi.go.ug

Aquaculture Research and Development Centre, Kajjansi (ARDC), is a national centre responsible for aquaculture research and development in Uganda. It is a branch of the National Fisheries Resources Institute (NAFIRRI).

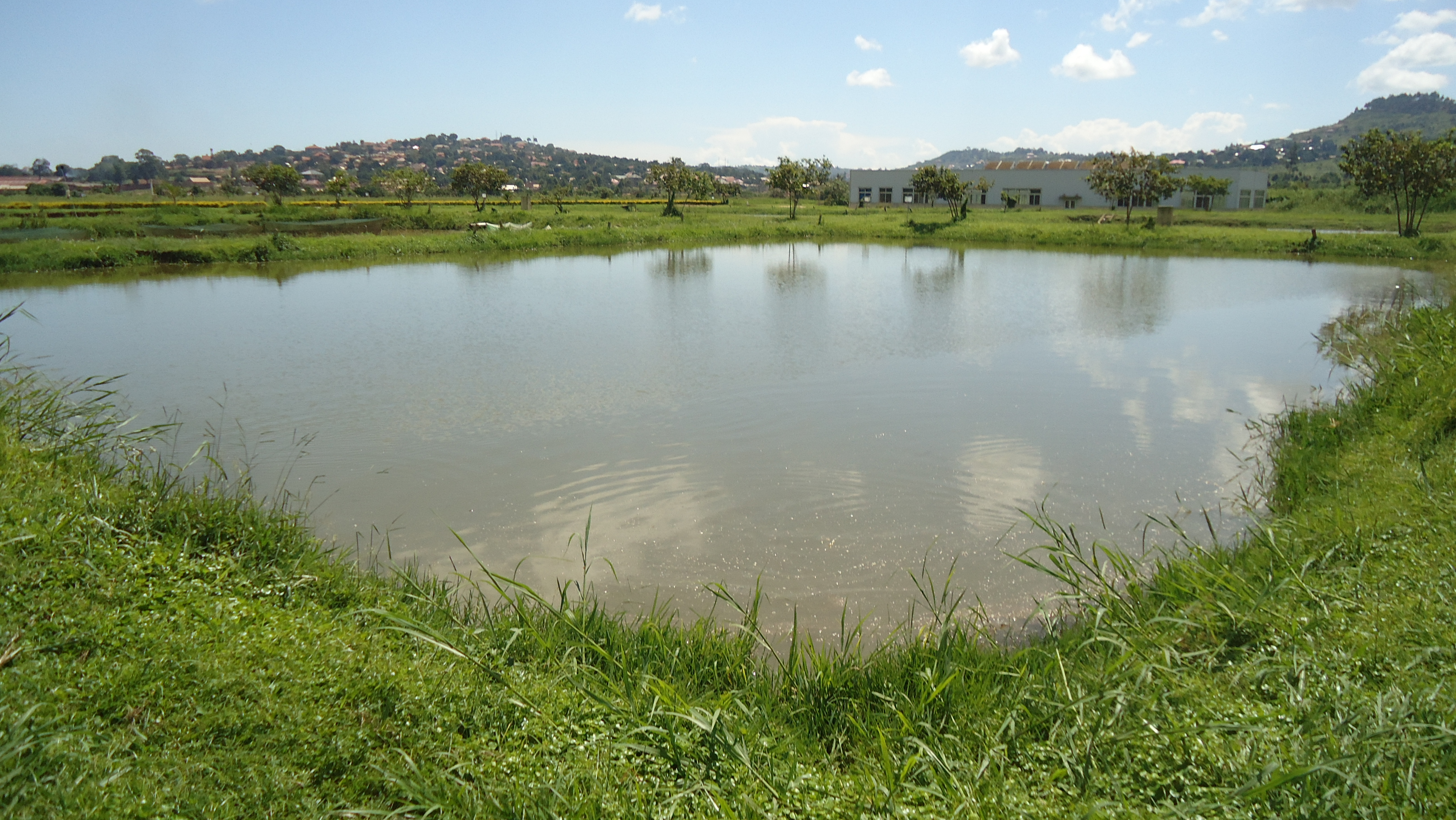
a fish pond in kajjansi

The center undertakes the following studies:

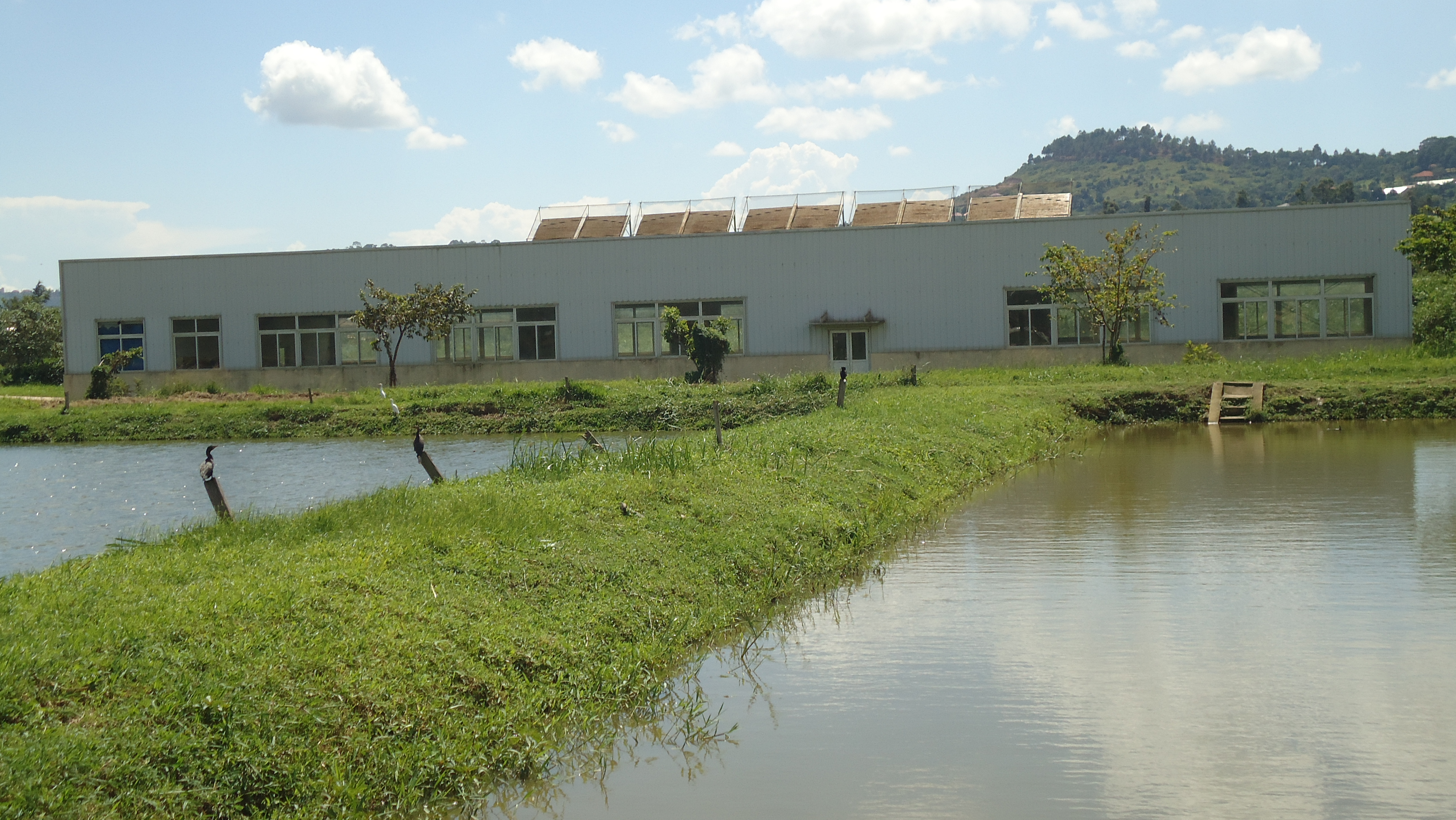
Fish hatchery at Kajjansi

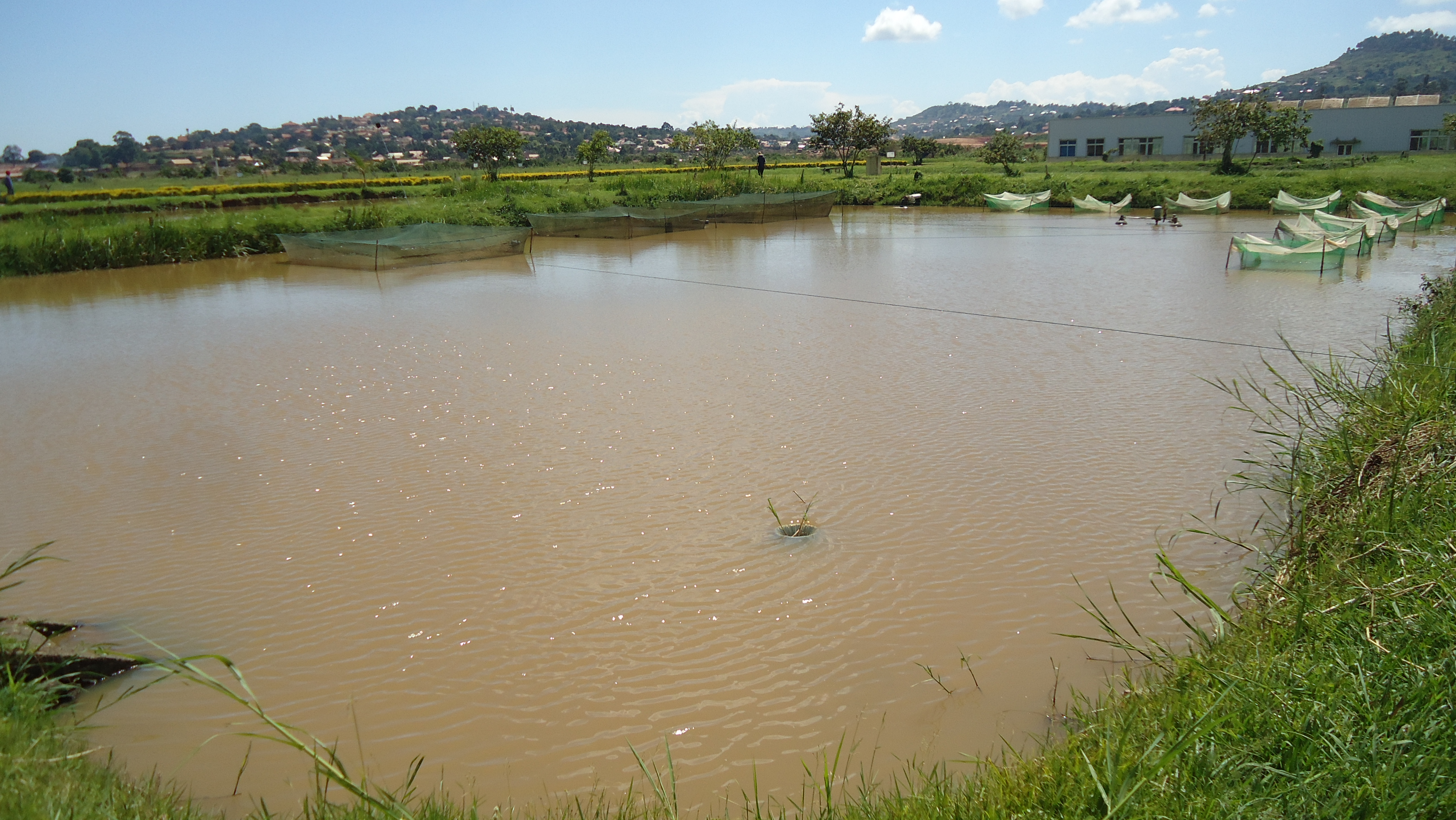
fish breeding pond at Aquaculture Research and Development Centre, Kajjansi

- Fish Feeds
- Fish Health
- Genetics
- Hatchery Productivity
- Mapping & Market
- MSI Nile Perch Project
- New species
- Ornamentals
- Production Systems.

The site attracts a number of bird species both Waterfowl species and land birds seen around the fish ponds and at the edges of the site. The centre undertakes research on 300 fish species that are extinct as well as the threatened ones like the riverine Ningu (Labeo victorianus), Kisinja (Barbus spp), Nkolongo (Synodontis spp) and Kasulu (Mormyrids).

== Fish reared at the site ==
- Nile Tilapia
- Nile perch.
- Mirror carp
- African catfish
- lung fish
- Kisinja
