= Synodontis sp. nov. 'Lower Tana' =

Conservation status
- Data Deficient (IUCN 3.1)

Scientific classification
- Kingdom: Animalia
- Phylum: Chordata
- Class: Actinopterygii
- Order: Siluriformes
- Family: Mochokidae
- Genus: Synodontis
- Species: S. sp. nov. 'Lower Tana'

Binomial name
- Synodontis sp. nov. 'Lower Tana'

Species of fish

Synodontis sp. nov. 'Lower Tana' is a species of fish in the family Mochokidae. It is endemic to Kenya. Its natural habitat is rivers.
