= Lake Victoria Fisheries Organization =

Institute under the East African Community

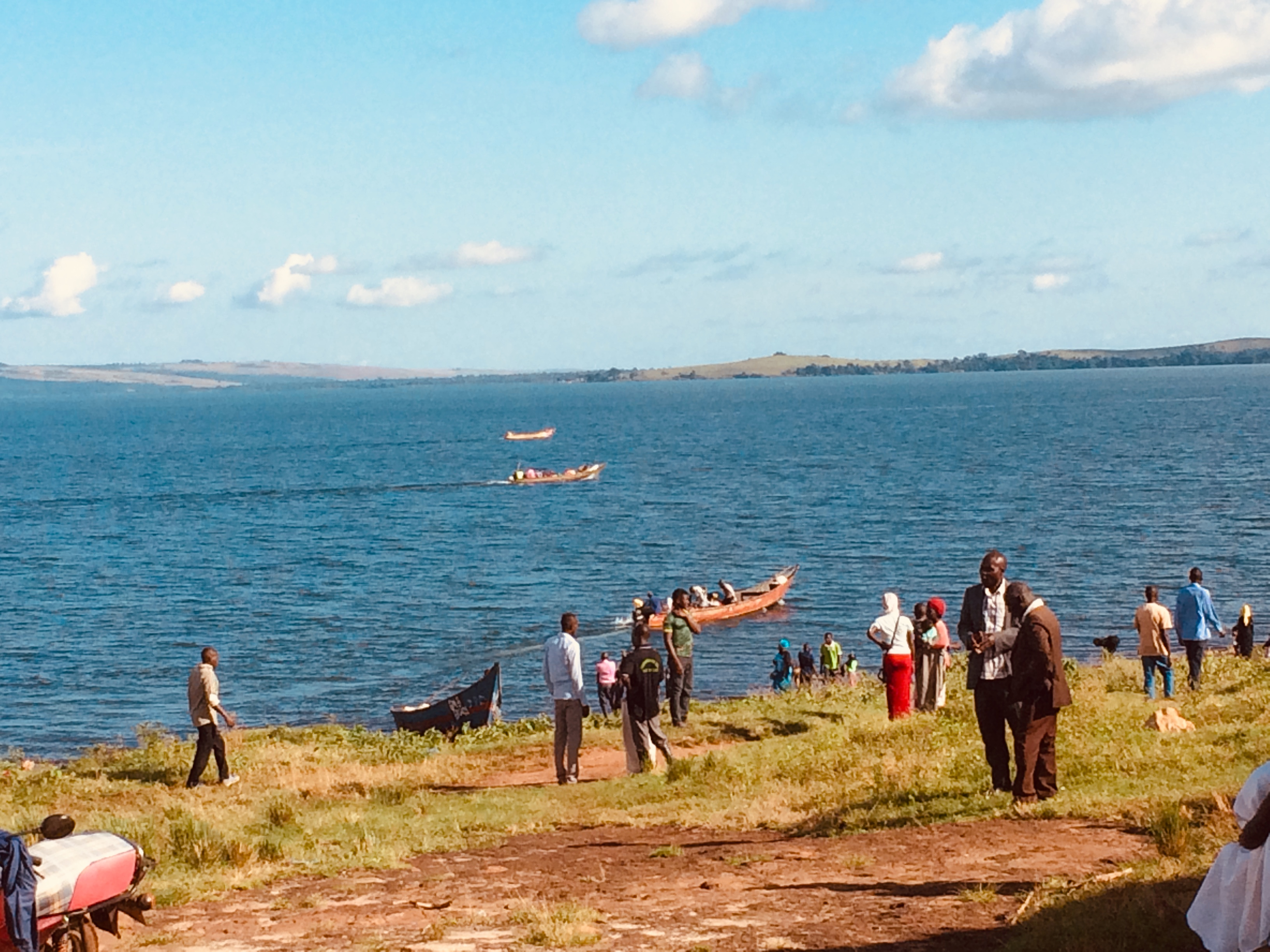
Fishermen standing besides Lake Victoria

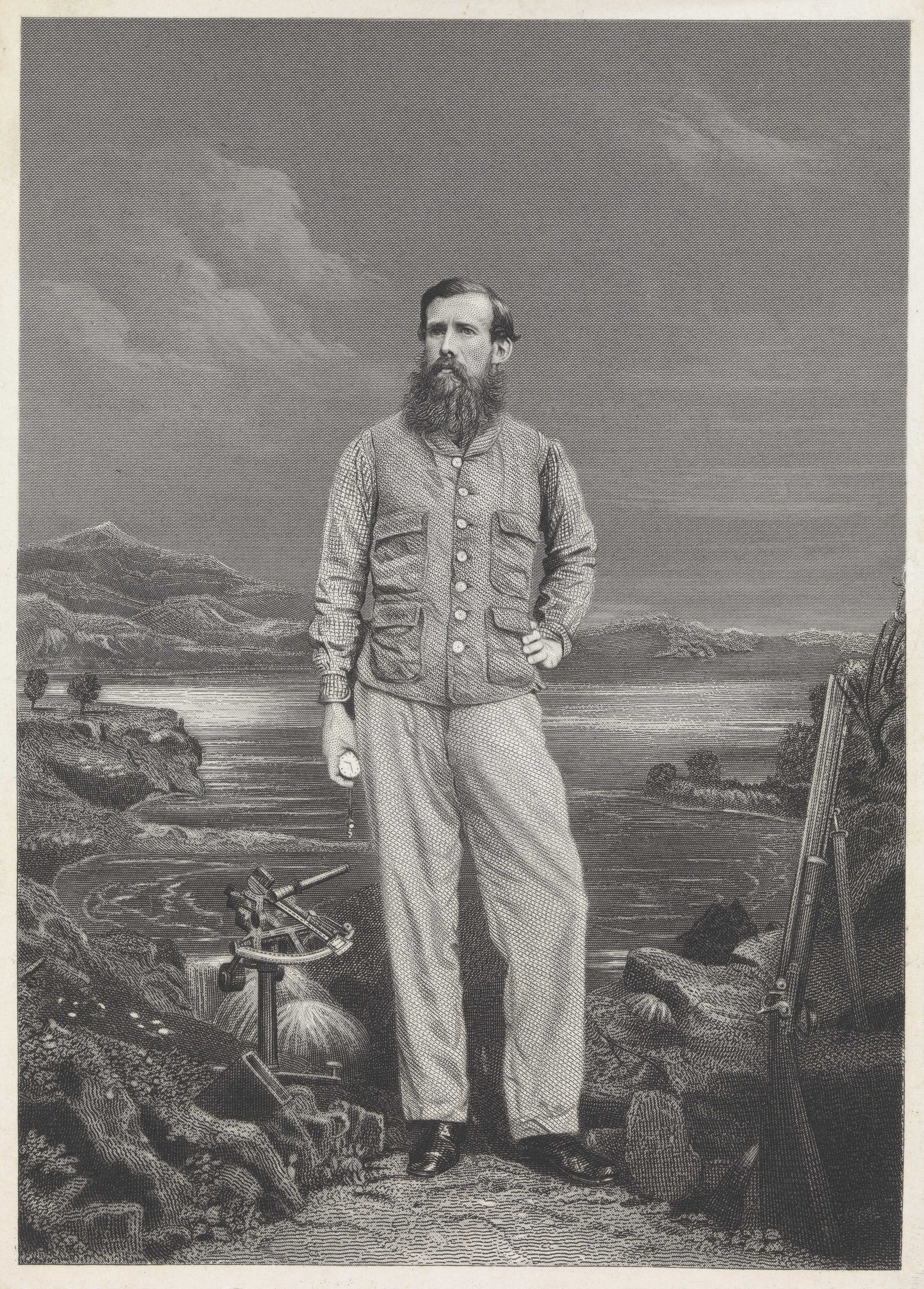
A portrait of John Hanning Speke, the first European person to reach Lake Victoria

The Lake Victoria Fisheries Organization (LVFO) is an institution under the East African Community, with the aim to harmonise, develop and adopt conservation and management measures for the sustainable utilisation of living resources of Lake Victoria, and to optimise socio-economic benefits from the basin for the partner states; Kenya, Tanzania, Burundi, and Uganda. The LVFO headquarters are in Jinja, Uganda. LVFO collaborates closely with the national fisheries research institutes in the three partner states.

== History ==
LVFO was established in June 1994 through the “Convention for the Establishment of the Lake Victoria Fisheries Organization”, and on the basis of the CIFA Sub-Committee for the Development and Management of the Fisheries of Lake Victoria. CIFA is the FAO Committee for Inland Fisheries of Africa.

== Structure ==
LVFO is composed of the Fisheries and Aquaculture Management and Research Institutions of Partner States, Beach Management Units, Secretariat, Associations of Fish Processors and Exporters.
