= Lambu Genocide Memorial =

Genocide memorial in Masaka District, Uganda

- Urwibutso rwa Jenoside rwa Lambu
- Location: Lambu, Masaka District, Uganda
- Type: Genocide memorial and burial site
- Dedicated to: Victims of the 1994 genocide against the Tutsi

The Lambu Genocide Memorial (Kinyarwanda: Urwibutso rwa Jenoside rwa Lambu) is a memorial to the victims of the 1994 genocide against the Tutsi. It is located in Lambu, in Masaka District, Uganda.

The memorial holds the remains of genocide victims whose bodies were carried by Rwandan rivers into Lake Victoria. The bodies were recovered on the Ugandan shore and buried in Uganda.

== Location ==
The memorial is in Lambu, in Masaka District, near the Ugandan shore of Lake Victoria.

During the genocide, many victims were thrown into rivers, including the Nyabarongo and the Kagera. These rivers flow into the Lake Victoria basin. Bodies were later found in the water and on the Ugandan shores of the lake.

Uganda has three burial and memorial sites for these victims: Ggolo in Mpigi District, Lambu in Masaka District, and Kasensero in Rakai District.

== History ==
In 1994, during the genocide, people were killed in Rwanda and thrown into rivers. The water carried the bodies to Lake Victoria and to several places on the Ugandan shore. Local authorities and residents recovered and buried them.

Most of the victims buried at Lambu could not be identified. The site preserves the memory of people killed in Rwanda and buried outside the country because the water carried their bodies away.

According to the High Commission of Rwanda in Uganda, the three memorials in Uganda hold the remains of 10,983 victims: 4,771 at Ggolo, 3,337 at Lambu and 2,875 at Kasensero.

In 2020, Rwanda and Uganda discussed the ownership or management of the land of these memorials, including Ggolo, Lambu and Kasensero. The stated aim was to allow Rwanda to maintain and clean the sites.

== Commemoration ==
Lambu is one of the few genocide memorials located outside Rwanda. Each year, families, survivors, Rwandans living in Uganda and officials gather there to honour the victims. Ceremonies take place during Kwibuka, the annual commemoration of the genocide against the Tutsi.

In 2023, a commemoration was held at the Lambu memorial. Members of the Rwandan community in Uganda, officials and Ugandans attended.

== See also ==
- List of Rwandan genocide memorials
- Ggolo Genocide Memorial
- Kasensero Genocide Memorial
