= Ggaba landing site =

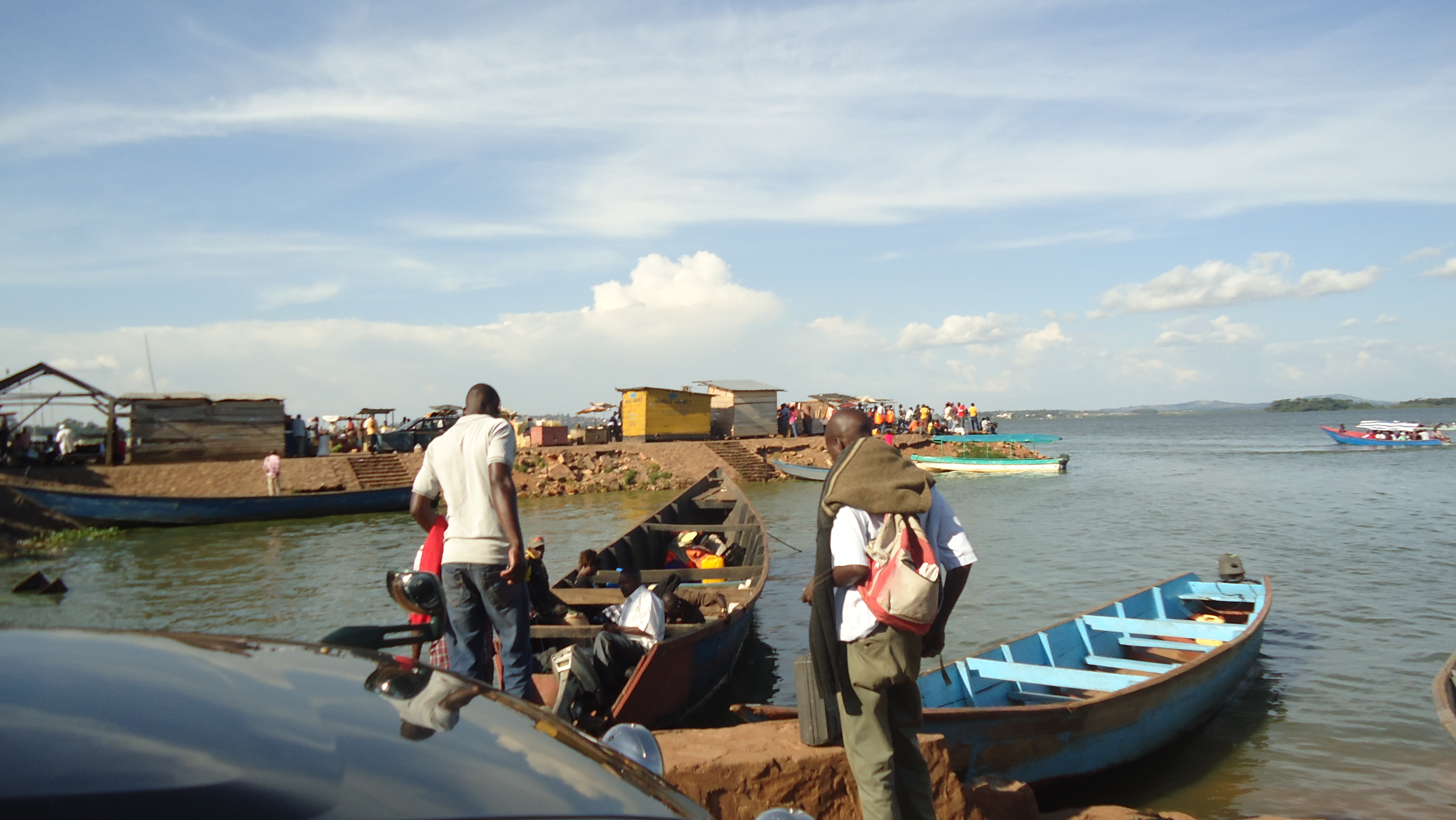
- Interactive map of Ggaba landing site
- Coordinates: 0.2564°N 32.6375°E
- Country: Uganda
- Region: Central Uganda
- District: Kampala Capital City Authority
- Division: Makindye Division
- Time zone: EAT

Gaba landing site is found on Lake Victoria, in Ggaba, Kampala Uganda. It is used as a centre for fish trade in Uganda.

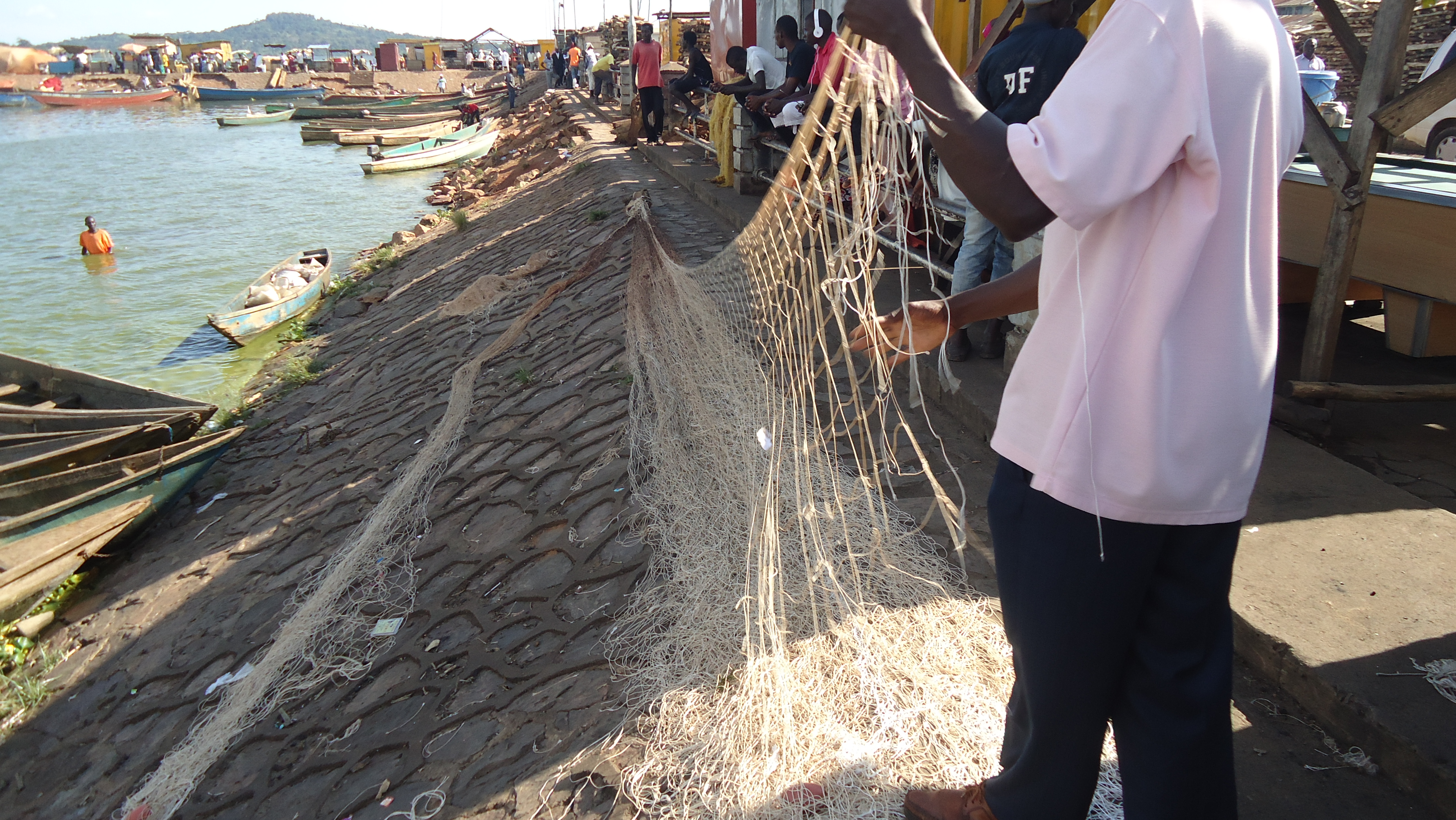
A fisherman preparing a net for fishing at Gaba landing site, Kampala

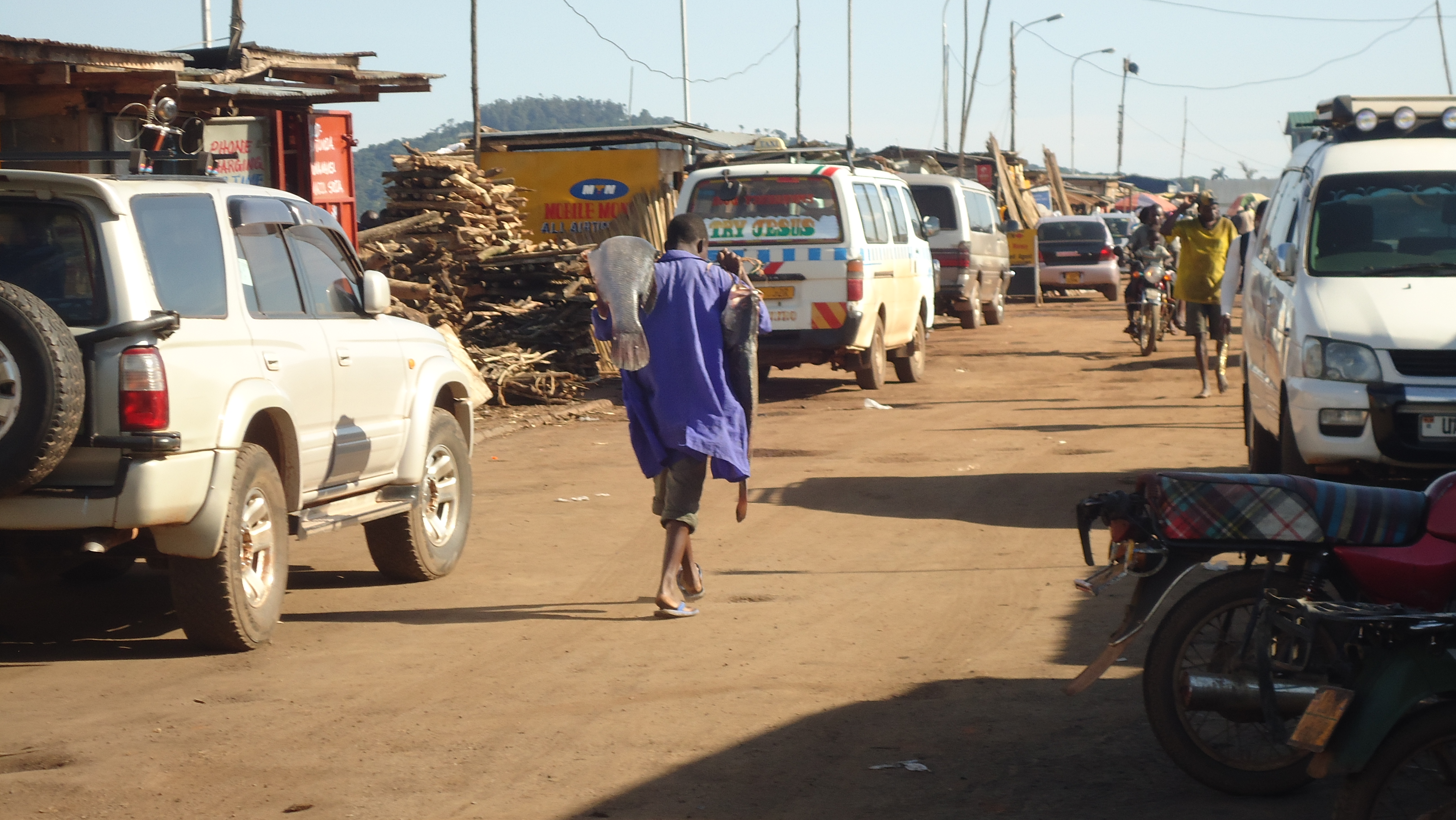
Fisherman with nile perch at Gaba landing site

== Developments ==
Ggaba landing site is on the shores of lake victoria. It is in Kampala. It is frequented by people who go to Ggaba beach which neighbours it. The site has a market where fish and foodstuffs are sold. it also has storage units, a trading point for fish, and offices for Kampala Capital City authority, which supervises the activities on the site.

== Fishing activities ==
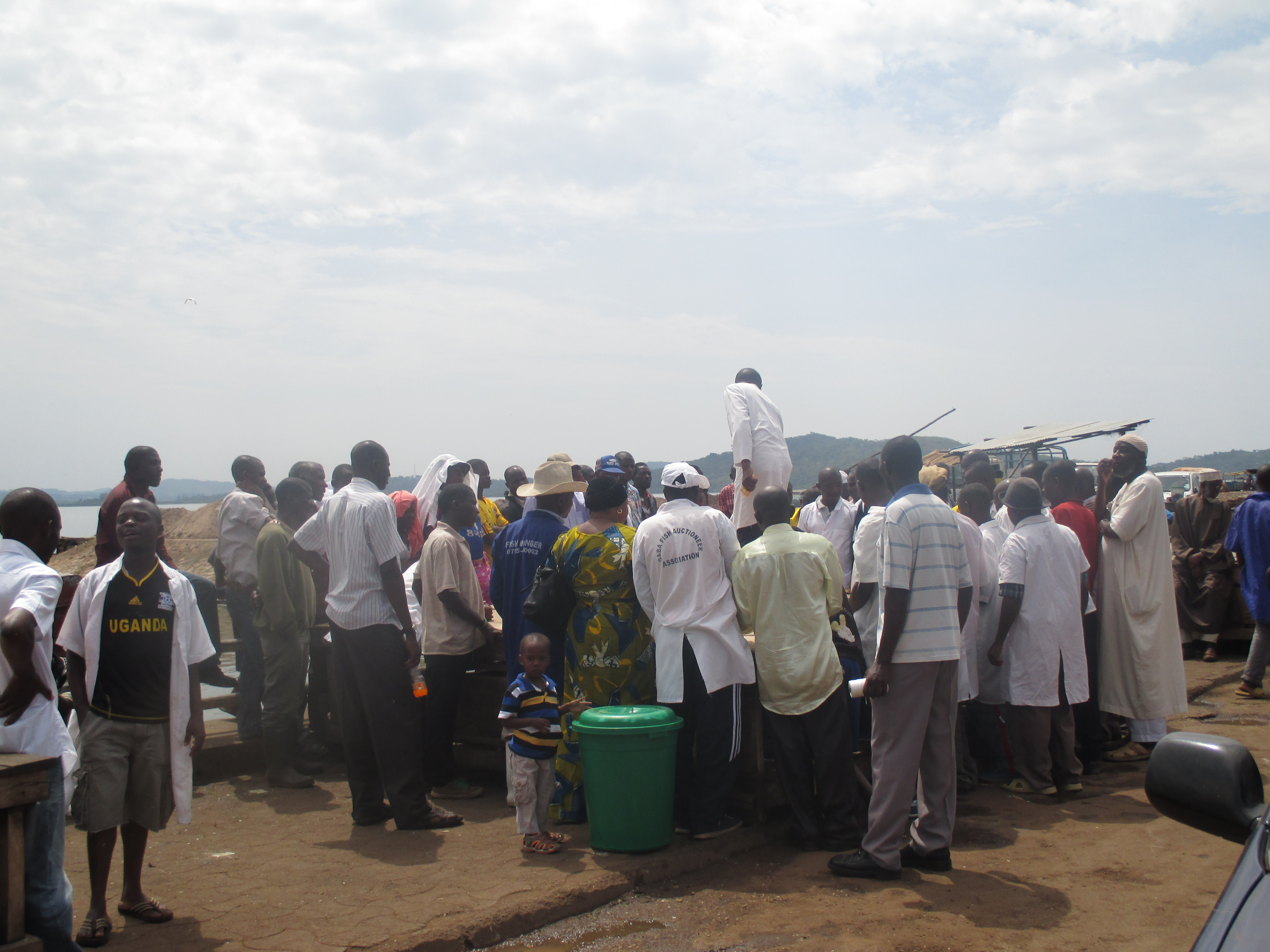
Auctioning of fish at Gaba landing site

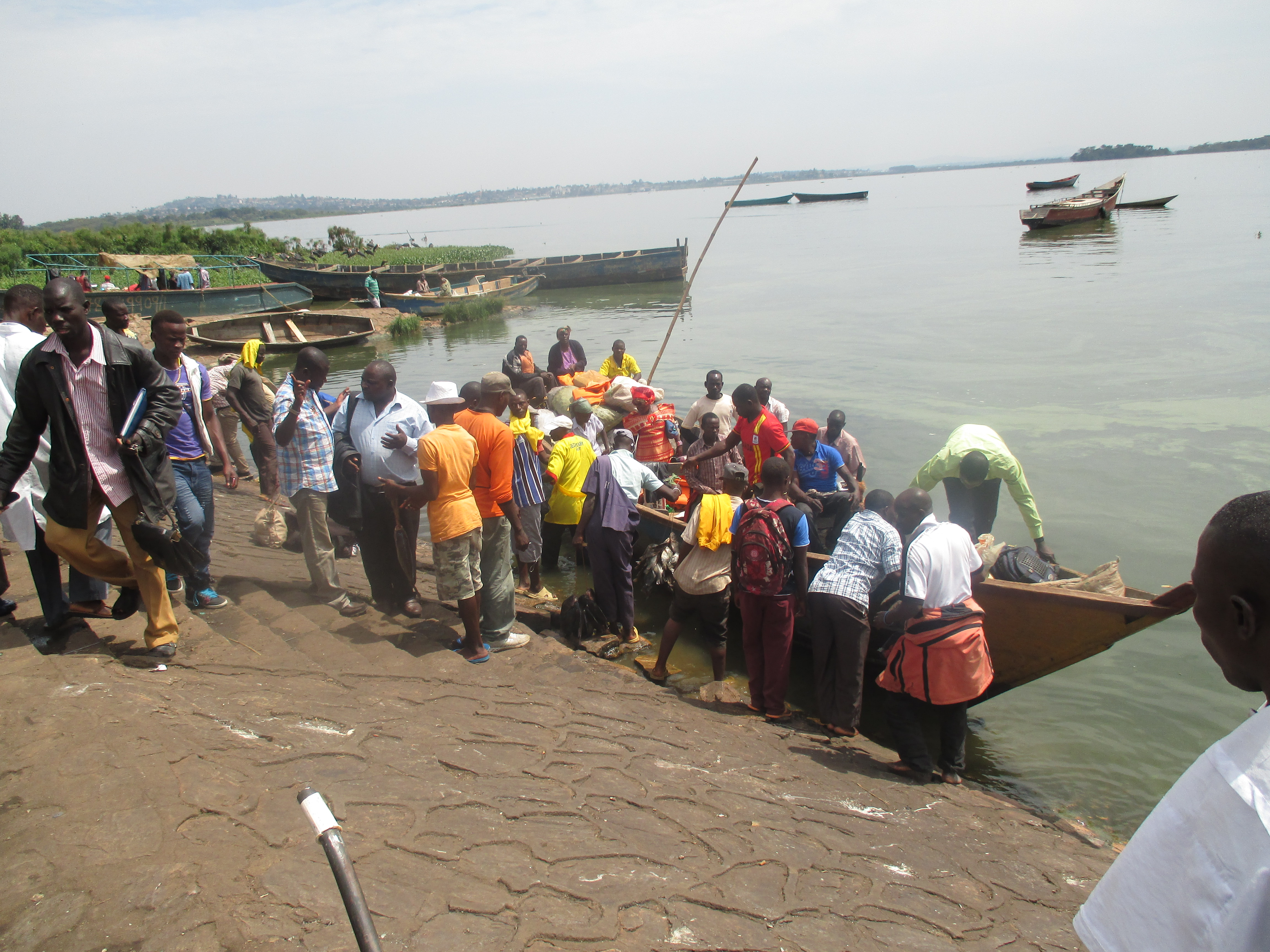
Fishermen returning to Gaba landing site to sell fish

Fishermen set off from the site and return with fish to sell. The fishes mostly caught in the waters near the site include: Nile perch, Tilapia, Lung fish and Cat fish. Fishing is mostly done in the middle of the lake, a little distance from the site. It is tilapia that is fished near the shore. Fishing has changed at the site over the years, from using small canoes to using motorized boats. The mode of transportation of fish has also evolved. The fish are moved in containers with ice, unlike before when they were simply dropped inside a boat and then delivered.

== See also ==
- Fishing in Uganda
- Fishing sites and Villages/communities in Uganda
- Types of fish in Uganda
