= Fishing sites and communities in Uganda =

Fishing sites and villages/communities in Uganda are mostly on islands and at landing sites. These act as central points for fish trade and fishing.

== Landing sites ==
Most activities of the fish trade take place at landing sites which act as both collection and trading centres for fish. The major freshwater sources have several landing sites which act as centres for fishing activities. Lake Victoria has Kasensero and Kyabasimba landing sites in Rakai District, Kasenyi and Kigungu in Wakiso District, Katosi and Ssenyi in Mukono District, Masese and Wairaka in Jinja District, and Gaba in Kampala district. The landing sites on Lake Kyoga include Kayago and Namasale in Lira District, and Kikaraganya, Kikarangenye and Lwampanga in Nakasongola District. Landing sites on Lake Albert include Abok and Dei in Nebbi District, and Kabolwa and Wanseko in Masindi District. Landing sites on Lake Edward and Lake George include Kasaka and Katunguru in Bushenyi District, and Katwe and Kayanja in Kasese District.

=== Ggaba landing site ===
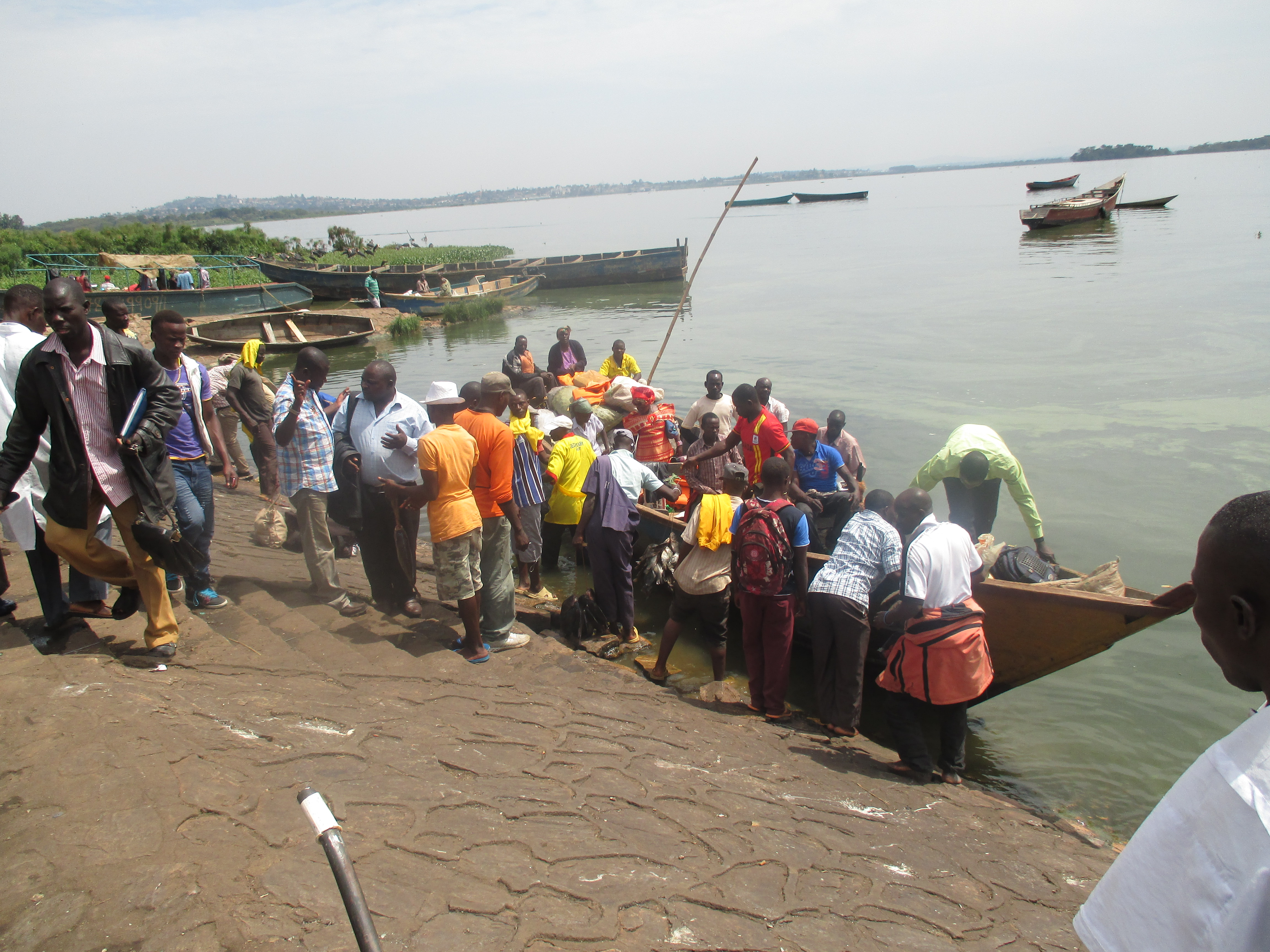
Fishermen returning to Gaba landing site

Ggaba landing site is found on Lake Victoria, in Kampala. It is used as a centre for fish trade. Fishermen set off from the site and return with fish to sell. The fish mostly caught in the waters near the site include Nile perch, tilapia, lungfish and catfish. Fishing is mostly done in the middle of the lake, a little distance from the site. Tilapia are fished near the shore.

Fishing has changed at the site over the years, from using small canoes to using motorised boats. The mode of transportation of fish has also improved. They are moved in containers with ice, unlike before when they were simply dropped inside a boat and then delivered.

=== Lutoboka landing site ===
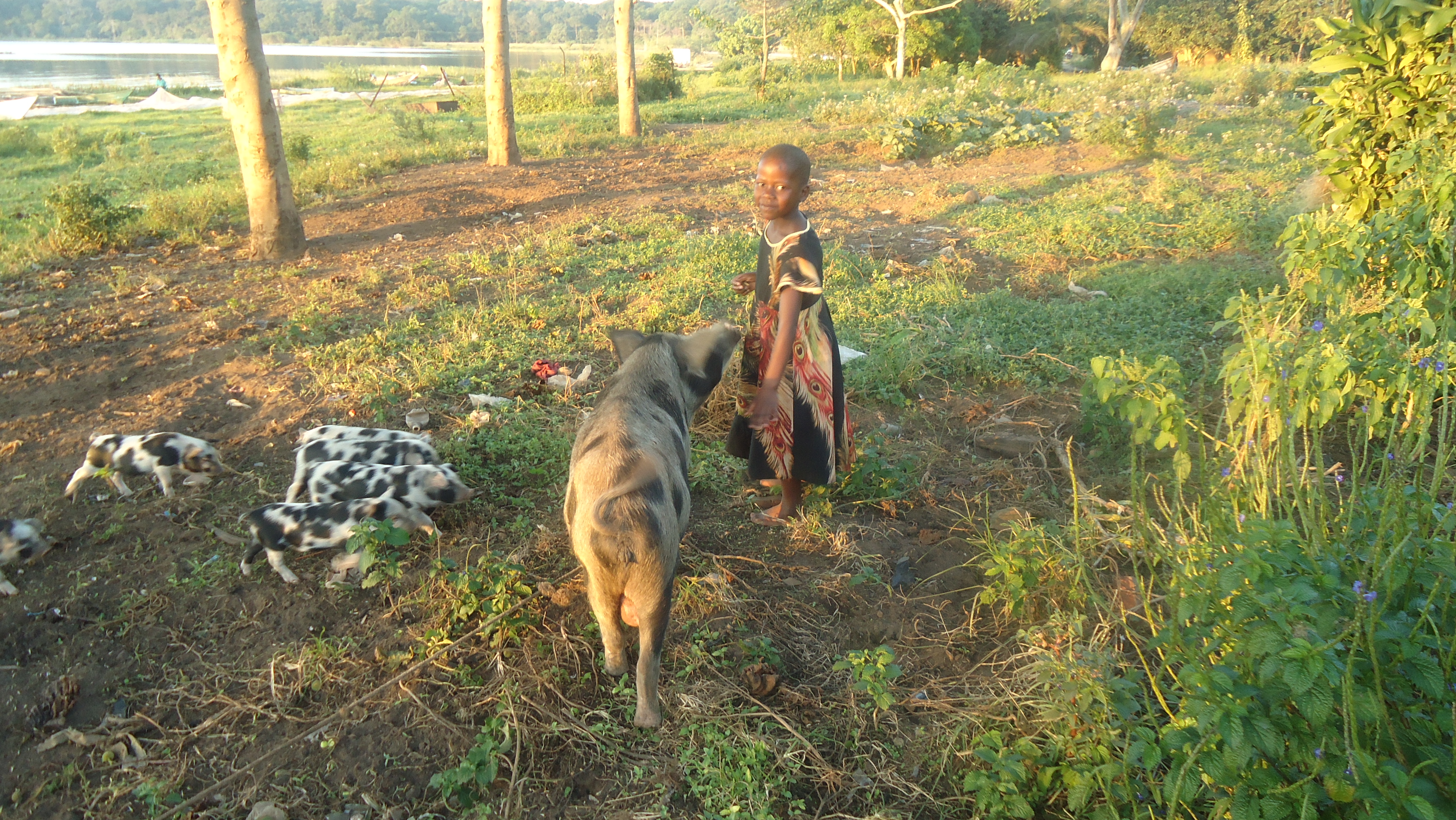
A fisherman's daughter with pigs in Kalangala

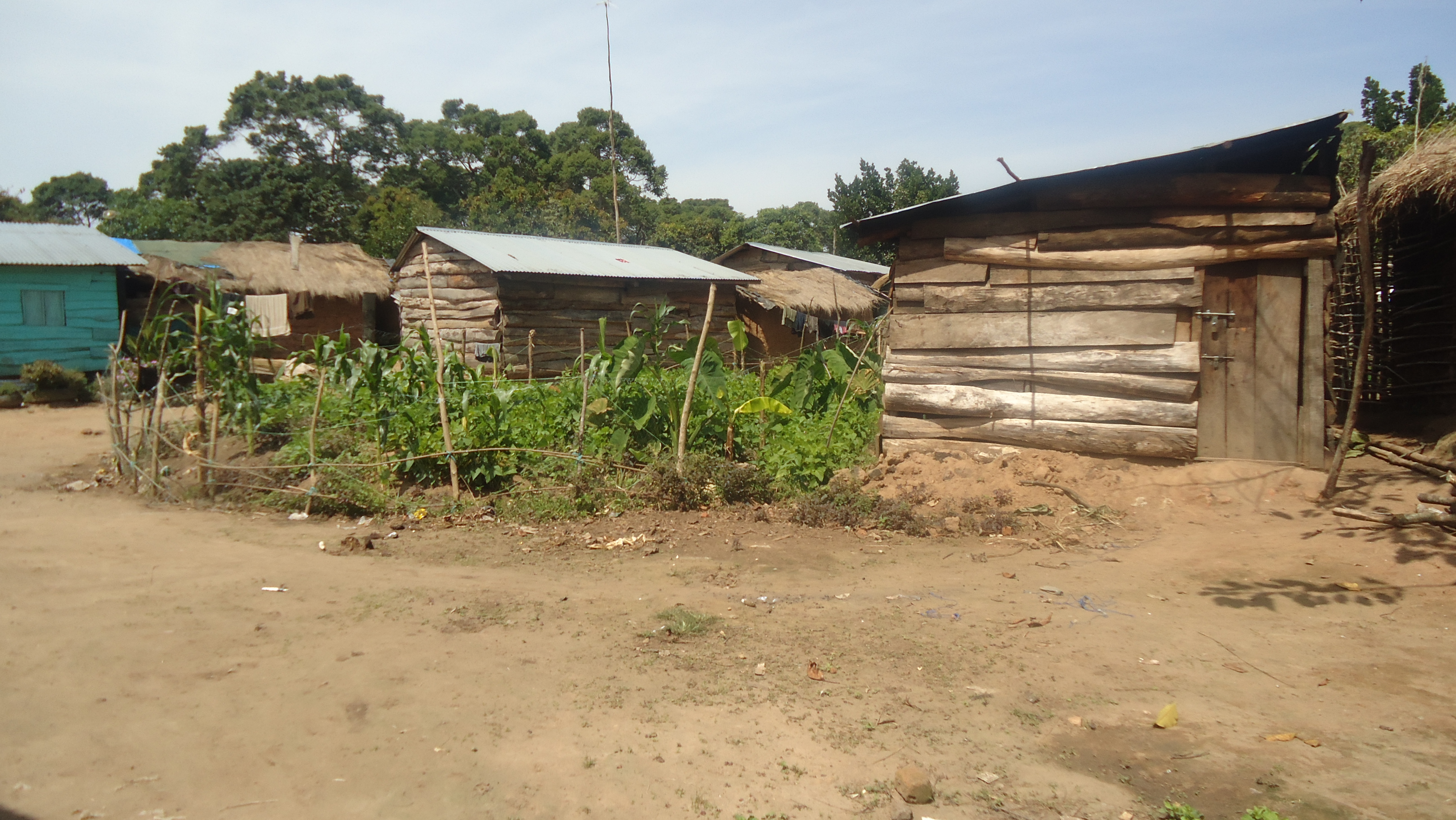
A garden on Lutoboka landing site in Kalangala

Lutoboka landing site is found on Lake Victoria, in Kalangala District, on Bugala Island. It is a tourist destination with hotels and resorts. The fish mostly caught at the site include Nile perch, tilapia, sprat and silverfish. Most fishermen engage in fishing of silverfish, tilapia and Nile perch. Fish preservation at the site is done though fish smoking, sun drying and steel cases. The fishermen usually fish at night. They leave in the evenings and return in the morning. Fishermen engage in farming and animal rearing to supplement their income.

=== Islands ===
In Uganda, fishing is most widely done on a large scale on the 84 Ssese Islands. The biggest and most active of these is Bugala Island in Kalangala District, and Koome Island in Mukono District. Fishing is the principal economic activity on these islands.

=== Lake Victoria fish communities ===
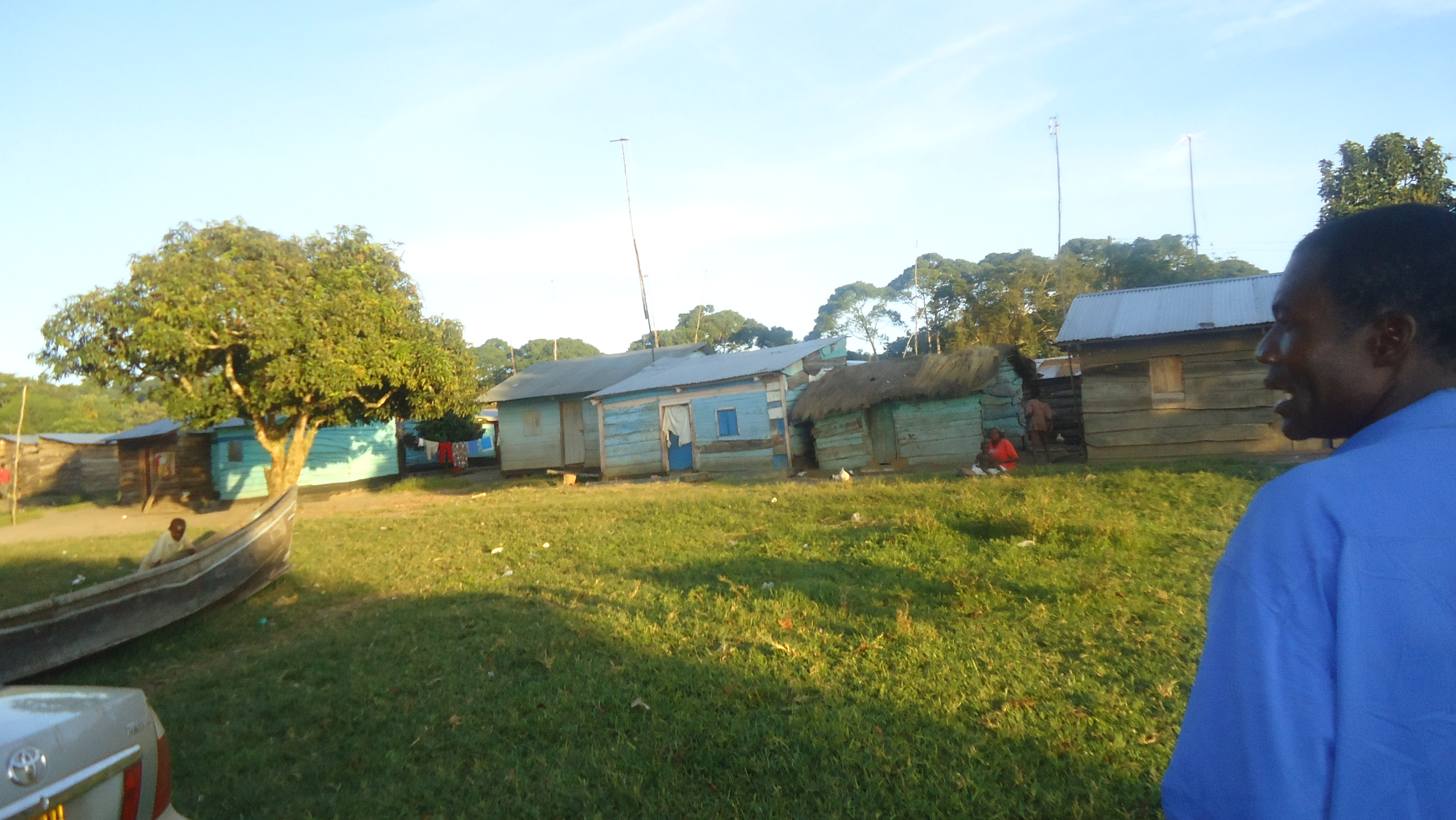
A fishing village on Lutoboka landing site

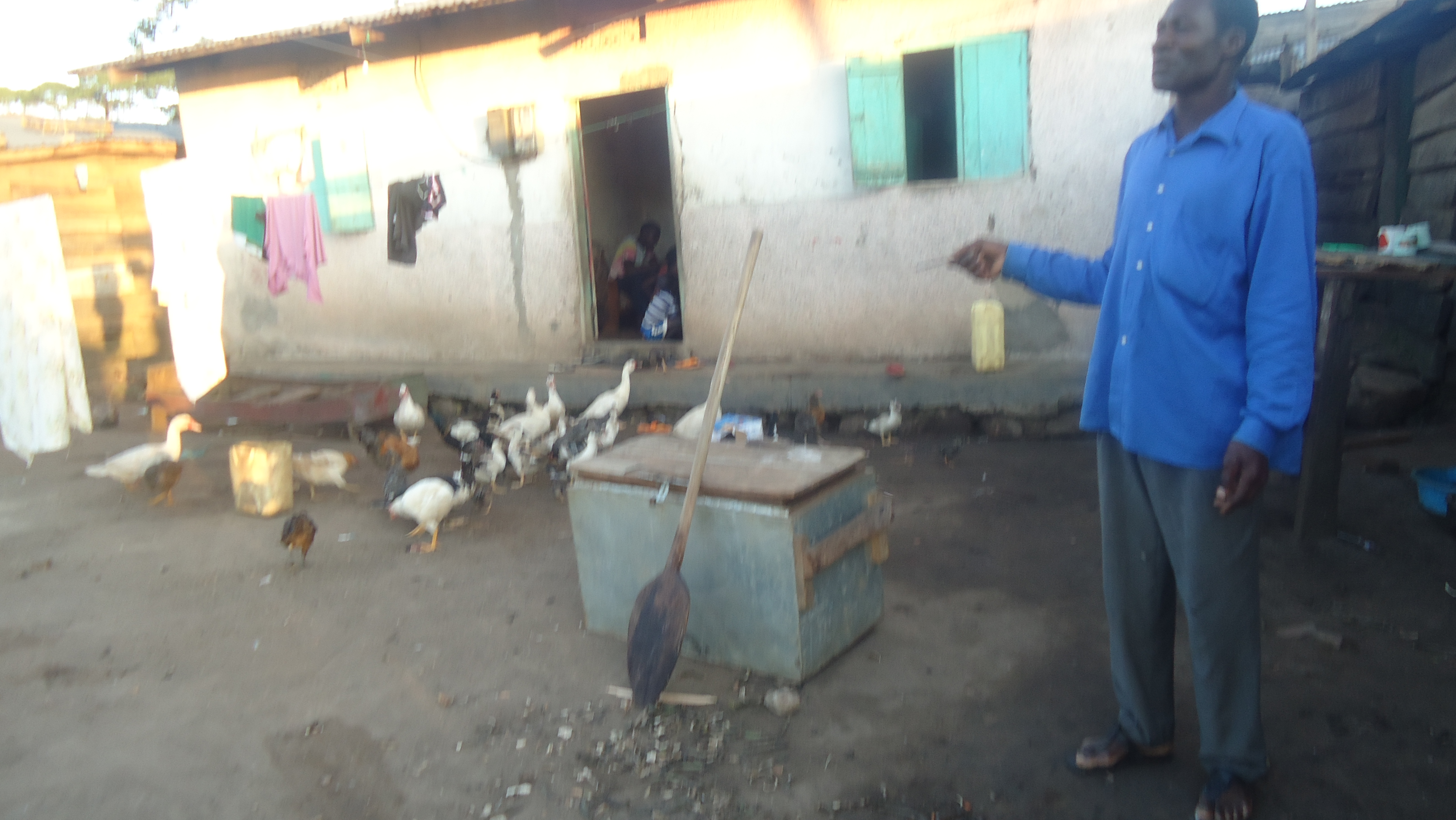
A fisherman's home in Kalngala with birds in the yard

Males dominate the fisheries (98%). The mean age of fishers is 29 years, with age 30 dominating. The majority of fishers are married (70%) and have families (74%). Most fishermen have stayed on landing sites for close to nine years. The fishermen are of varied ethnic backgrounds with Baganda being 49%; the Samia 14%; Basoga 9%; and Alur, Iteso, Bakenye, Bagwere, Adhola, Banyankole, Banyarwanda, Jaluo and Banyala constituting 28%.

Youthful men do the fishing while the women are involved in fish drying (sardines), traditional processing of fish and cooking. Most fishing units are owned by people who do not go fishing themselves but hire others to catch fish. The involvement of family is less. The other groups involved in fishing include fish traders, boat owners and fish smokers.
