= Kasensero landing site =

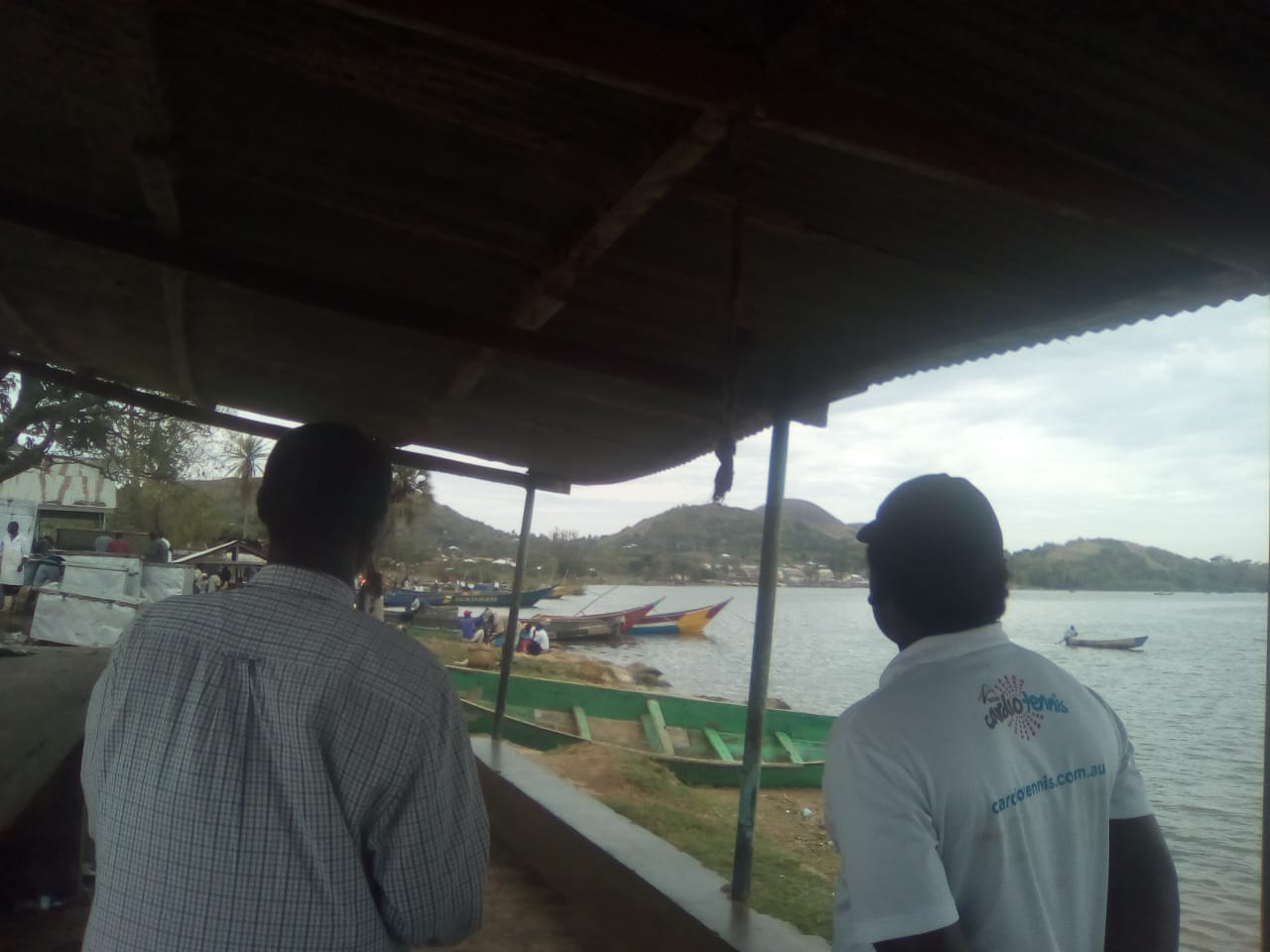
- Country: Uganda
- Region: Central Uganda
- District: Rakai Capital City Authority

Population (2020)
  - Urban: 15,000
- Time zone: EAT

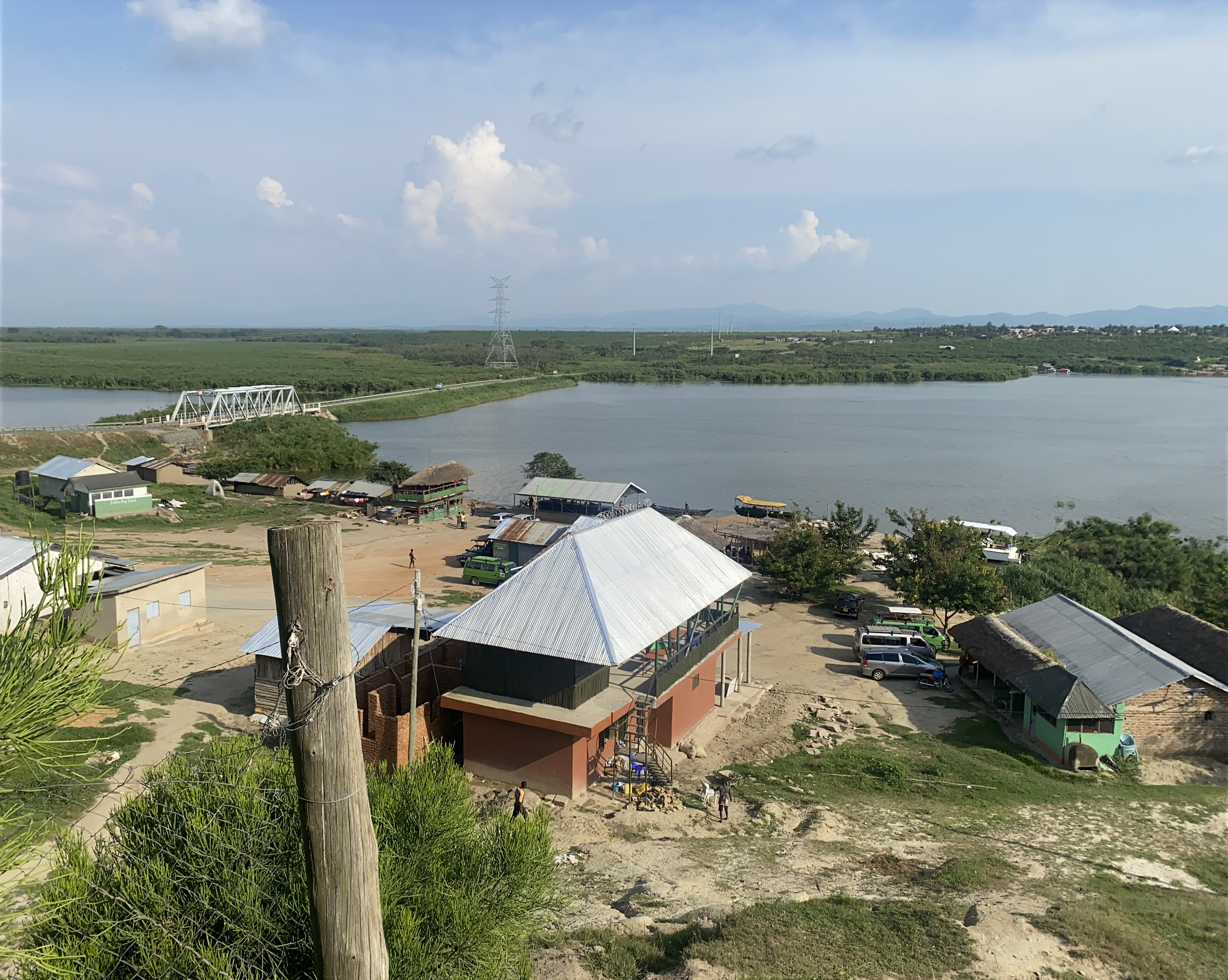
Katunguru landing site

Kasensero landing site is a fishing port found on Lake Victoria, in the Rakai District of Central Uganda, a short distance from its border with Tanzania. Kasensero is used as a centre for fish trade in Uganda. The community has a population of approximately 15,000 inhabitants.

== Developments ==
Kasensero landing site is located on the western shore of Lake Victoria. Kasensero is also the Point of Entry through which traders, fishermen and travellers from East African countries access Uganda.

== Fishing activities ==
The fish mostly caught in the waters near the site include: Nile perch, Tilapia, Lung fish and Cat fish. Fishing is mostly done in the middle of the lake, a little distance from the site. It is tilapia that is fished near the shore. Fishing has changed at the site over the years, from using small canoes to using motorized boats. The mode of transportation of fish has also evolved. The fish are moved in containers with ice, unlike before when they were simply dropped inside a boat and then delivered.

== Public health ==
Since Kasensero is the main entrance port for travelers into Uganda from Eastern Africa and is crowded with fish markets as well as commercial sex workers, the transmission of COVID-19 was a public health concern during the 2020 pandemic.

The Kasensero landing site is where the first confirmed cases of HIV in Uganda were reported, being dubbed the "birthplace of HIV". Approximately a third of Kasensero's population is HIV-positive as of 2012.

== See also ==
- Fishing in Uganda
- Fishing sites and Villages/communities in Uganda
- Types of fish in Uganda
