= Types of fish in Uganda =

There are two major sources of fish in Uganda; one is from aquaculture, the other from fishing in rivers and lakes. Different types of fish flourish in different water sources. The waters of Uganda contain an impressive array of fish species—over 90 in all. This count does not include the Haplochromis complex, which itself is made up of more than 200 species.

Fish that are the target of most commercial and subsistence exploitation include species like Nile perch (Lates niloticus), Nile Tilapia (Oreochromis niloticus), Pebbly Fish or Silversides (Alestes baremoze), Bagrus Catfish (Bagrus), Clarias Catfish (Clarias), Tiger Fish (Hydrocynus), the Silver Cyprinid (Rastrineobola argentea), Lungfish (Protopterus), and the Haplochromines (Haplochromis).

Nile Tilapia (Oreochromis niloticus) and Nile perch (Lates niloticus) are the most common fish species in Uganda. Other fish types include spat, cat fish, silver fish.

== Nile Perch ==
The Nile Perch (Lates niloticus) is locally known as "Empuuta", especially in the central region or "Puuta" in Northern Uganda. It weighs up to 80 kilograms. In Uganda, it is a native species to Lake Albert where it is locally known as Gur, and the River Nile below Murchison Falls. It was introduced into Lakes Kyoga and Victoria basins in the mid-1950s, but its presence in Lake Victoria was first noted in 1960. Although 'the Nile Perch was introduced into Lake Victoria in the early 1960s, it took more than 10 years to get fully established in the new ecosystem.

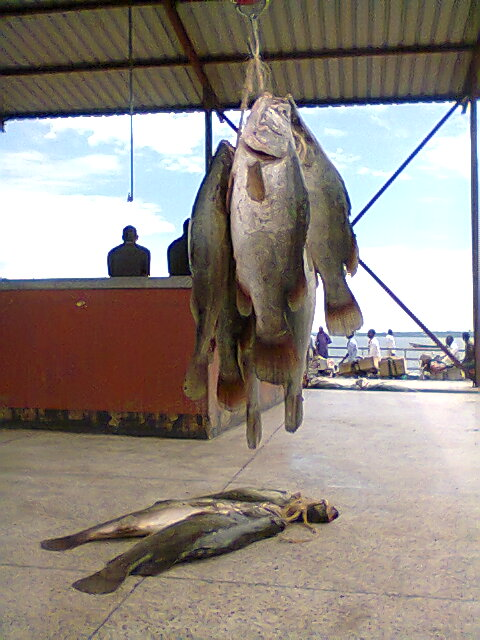
Nile perch on Gaba landing site

== Singida Tilapia ==
The Singida Tilapia (Oreochromis esculentus) is locally known as "Ngege". It is a critically endangered species of cichlid endemic to the Lake Victoria basin, including some of its satellite lakes such as Lake Kyoga. Its common name refers to Lake Singida, but this population is the result of an introduction that happened in the 1950s. It is among the oldest types of fish in Uganda. Due to the introduced predatory Nile perch (Lates niloticus) and the highly competitive Nile tilapia (Oreochromis niloticus), it has become very rare.

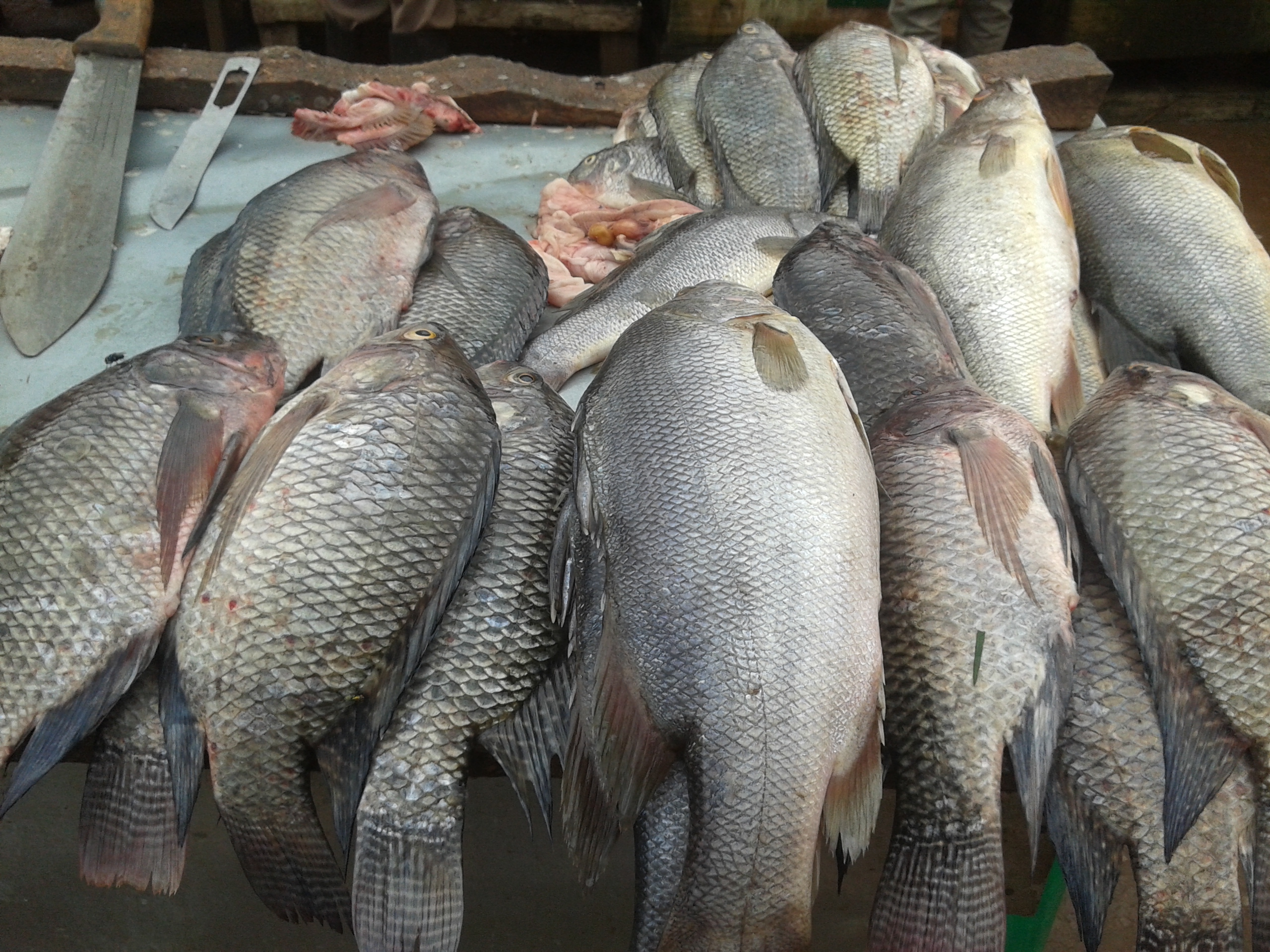
Tilapia fish

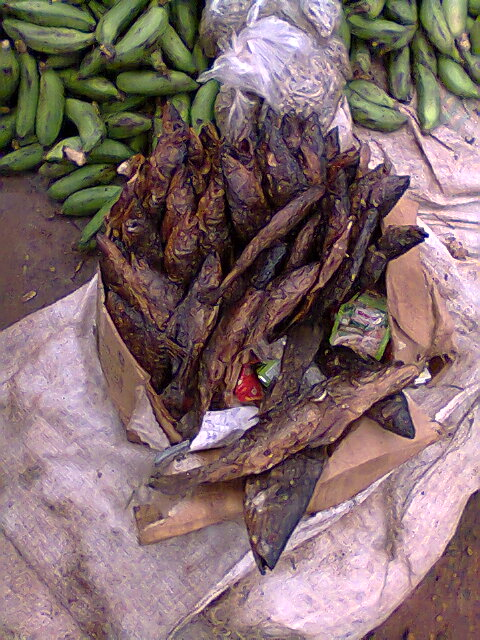
Dry tilapia in a market in Uganda

== Nile Tilapia ==
The Nile Tilapia (Oreochromis niloticus) is a species of tilapia, a cichlid fish native to the northern half of Africa and the Levante area (Lowe-McConnell, 1988). Numerous introduced populations exist outside its natural range. The Nile Tilapia reaches up to 60 cm in length, and can exceed 5 kg.

== Semutundu Catfish ==
The Semutundu Catfish (Bagrus docmak) is locally known as "Semutundu" and a species of the bagrid catfishes, i.e. the genus Bagrus. In Uganda, it is widely distributed in the Rift Valley Lakes Edward, George, Albert, Victoria and the Nile system. It is grey-black above, creamy white below. It lives in both shallow and deep water. It feeds on insects, crustaceans, mollusks and fish. Takes any live or dead bait fished on or near the bottom.

== Silver Cyprinid ==
The Silver Cyprinid (Rastrineobola argentea), also known as the Lake Victoria Sardine, is locally known as "Mukene". It is a small species of pelagic, freshwater ray-finned fish in the carp family (Cyprinidae) from East Africa, and can grow to a length of 9 cm (3.5 in).

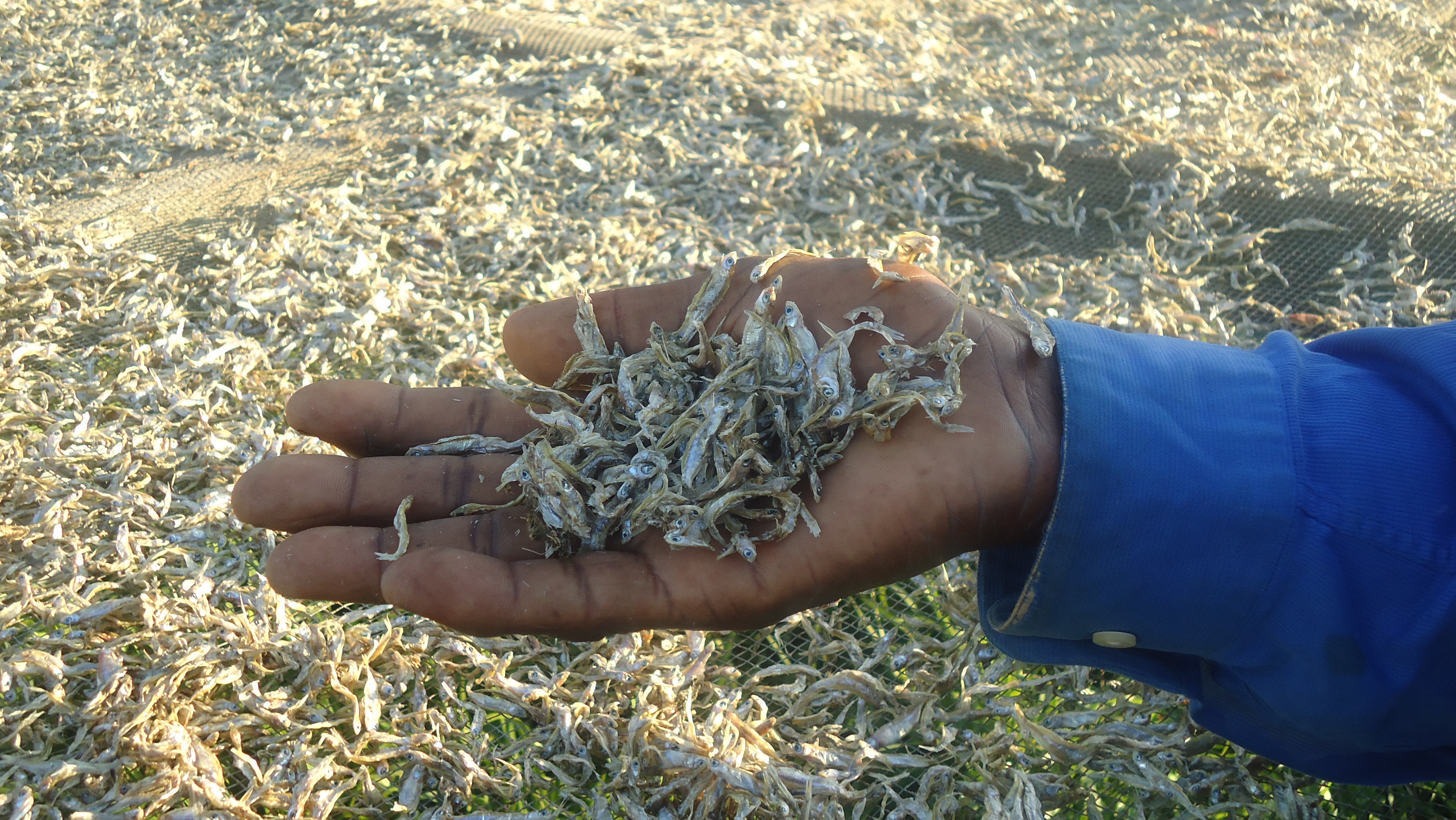
A fisherman holding Silver fish

== Marbled Lungfish ==
The Marbled Lungfish (Protopterus aethiopicus) is a lungfish of the family Protopteridae. It is found in Eastern and Central Africa, as well as the Nile region. In Uganda, it lives in the Nile basin, including lakes such as Albert, Edward, Victoria, Nabugabo, and Kyoga. It is locally known as "Emamba".

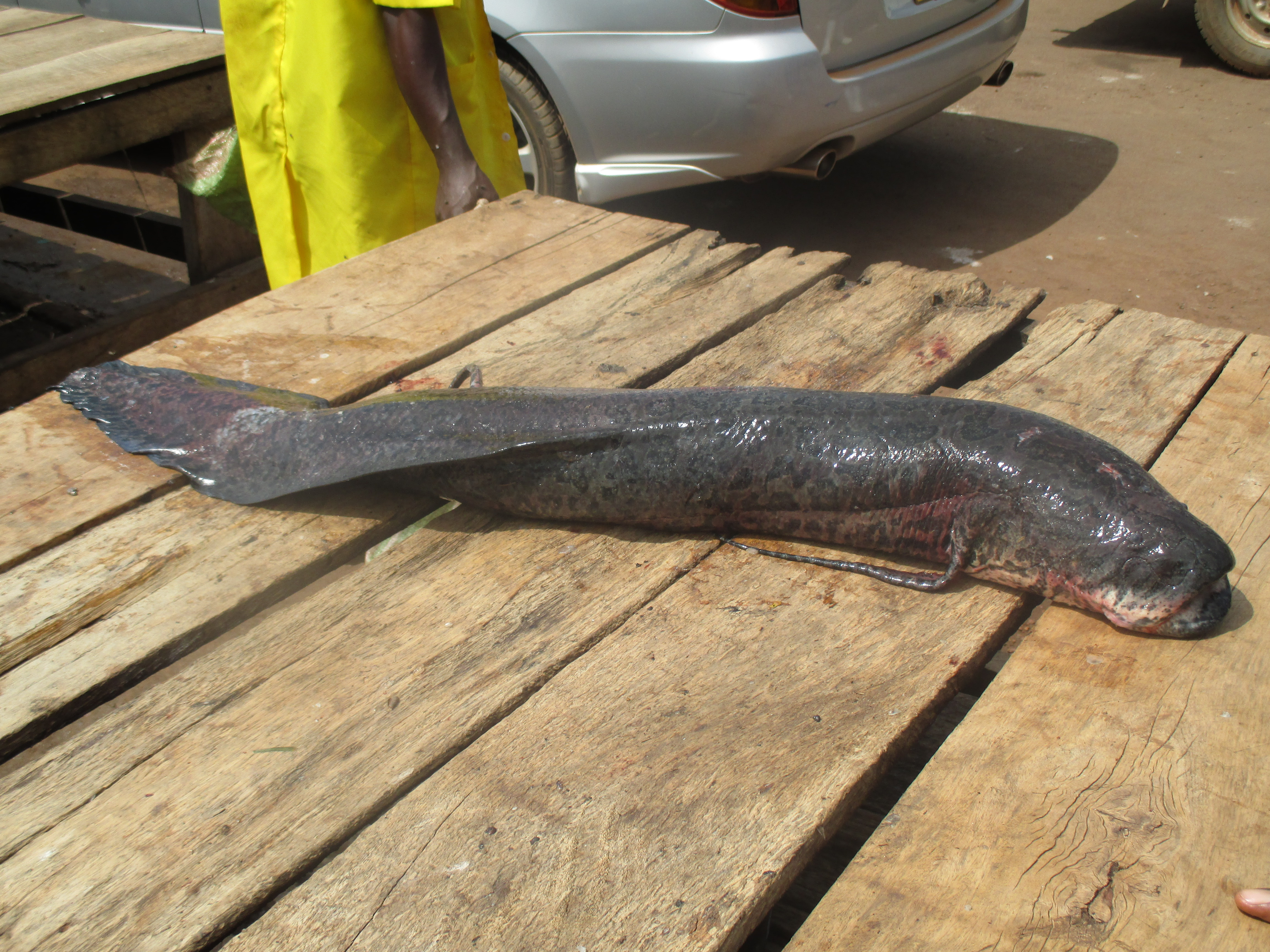
Lungfish at gaba landing site

== Mudfish ==
Mudfish are locally known as "Ensonzi". They are a kind of catfish common in East African swamps. Once caught, they are individually rolled up and several of them in a row are put on a stick and then smoke-dried. They are mostly put in ground nut soup to add a flavor of fish.

== Sprat ==
Sprat is locally known as "Enkejje" in the central region. It is fished near the shore. Several of them in a row are put on a stick, dried and sold in local markets. Sprat is usually fried and eaten in soups, sauces and stews but it's mostly prepared in groundnut or peanut sauce locally referred to as "Ebinyeebwa" in central Uganda.

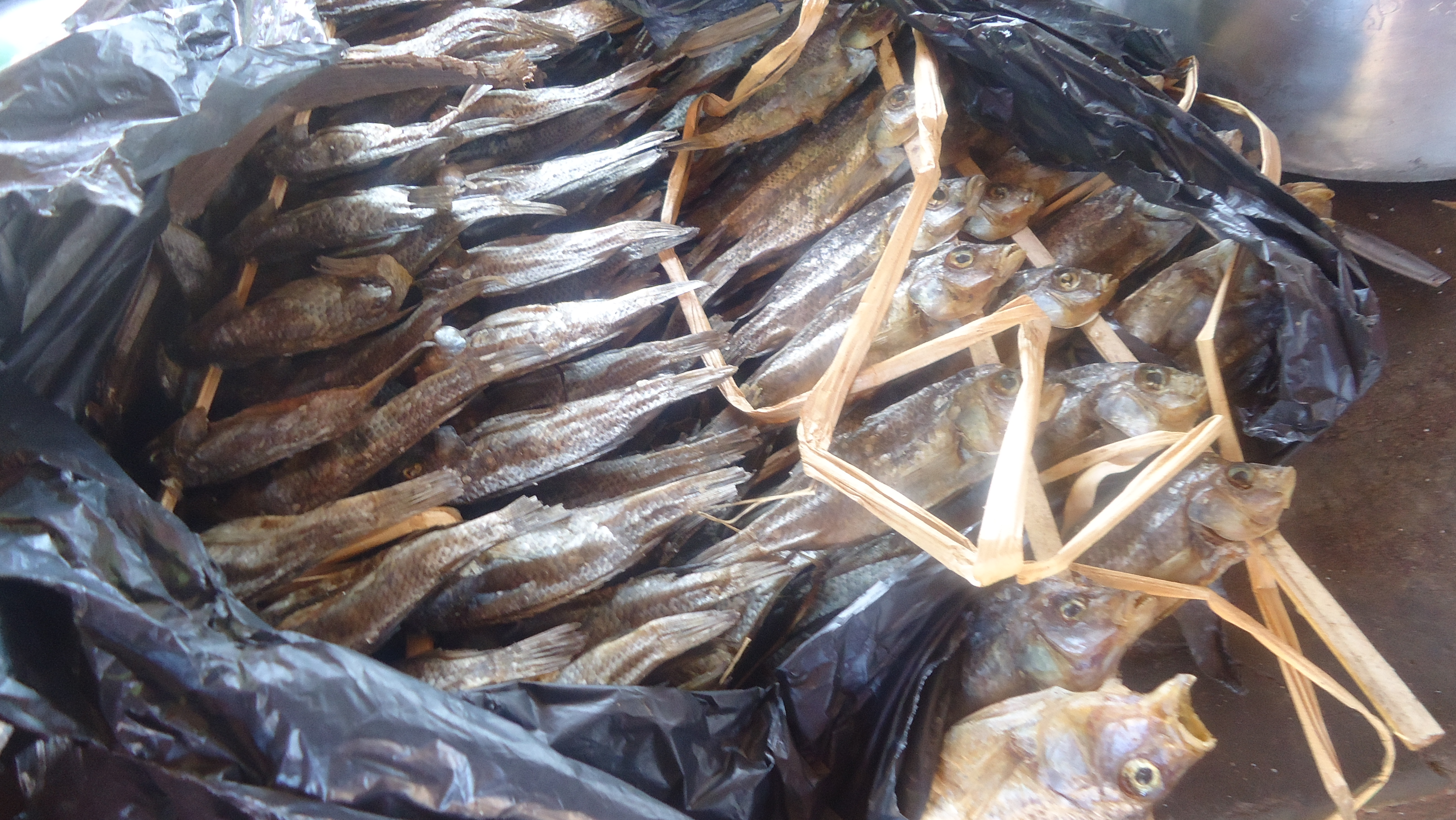
Sprat in a market in kalangala

== Clarias Catfishes ==
Clarias Catfishes (Clarias) are a genus of the family Clariidae, the airbreathing catfishes. They are locally known as "Emalle".

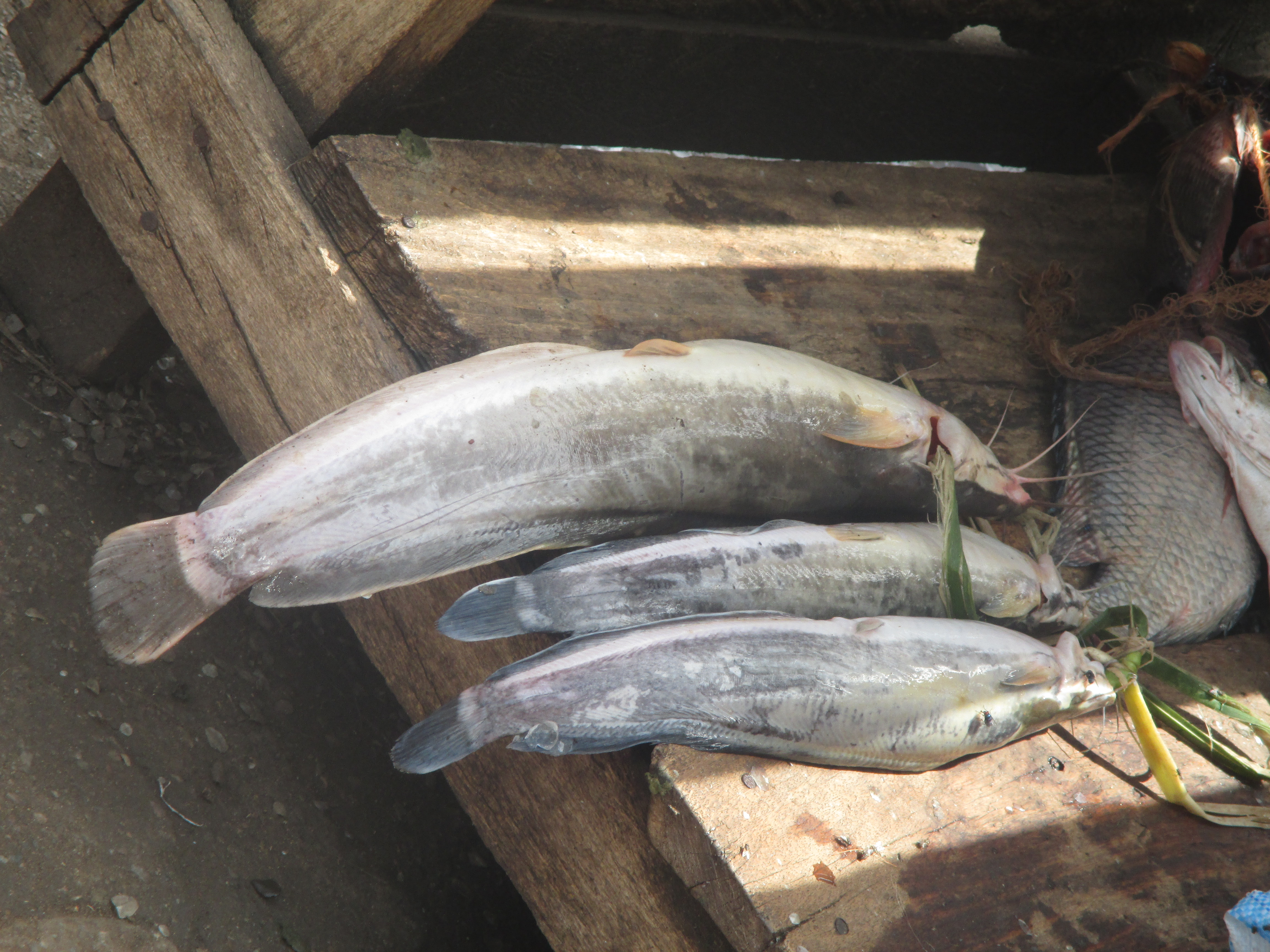
Clarias at Gaba landing site

== Elongate Tiger Fish ==
The Elongate Tiger Fish (Hydrocynus forskahlii), locally known as Ngassa, is found in the Nile and Lake Albert. It is an open water predator often found near the surface and in fast flowing water. It forms shoals and feeds on fishes, preferring long-bodied fish, as they are easier to swallow. It also takes insects, grasshoppers and snails. Cannibalistic. Silver with long and slender profile. Tail fin forked with bright red color, rest of fins uniformly grey. Regularly takes spinners retrieved at high speed across fast-flowing water. It is used by fishermen as live bait for Nile Perch.

== African Tiger Fish ==
The African Tiger Fish (Hydrocynus vittatus) is locally known as Wagassa. It grows up to 105 cm long and 28 kg in weight. It has long gill rakers. The tips of adipose and dorsal fins black. The forked edge of its tail fin is black. It prefers warm, well-oxygenated water in larger rivers and lakes. All but the largest fish form roving schools of like-sized fish; aptly described as fierce and voracious. It feeds on whatever prey is most abundant.

== Niger Barb ==
The Niger Barb (Barbus bynni bynni) grows up to 82 cm in length and 4 kg in weight. It is confined to the Nile and lakes that are, or were once, connected to the Nile. It feeds on crustaceans, insects, mollusks and organic debris.

== Lake Victoria Squeaker ==
The Lake Victoria Squeaker (Synodontis victoriae), also locally known as Wahrindi, is a species of upside-down catfish. It grows up to 35 cm in length and 1.5 kg in weight. It has one strong dorsal spine and spines within the pectoral fins, which are long and serrated. The spines can be locked at right angles to the body as a form of self-defence. It squeaks when caught or distressed. It is found mostly near soft bottoms of the water bodies and close to banks. Near waterfalls, it is found in slower flowing water. The fish of the shallow, faster water are generally of a lighter greyish-green colour, whilst the fish of the deeps are a darker, blacker colour.

== Pebbly Fish or Silversides ==
The Pebbly Fish or Silversides (Alestes baremoze) is locally known as Angara. It grows up to 43 cm in length, and 500 g in weight. It is silver coloured with blue-grey black and white belly, greyish fins with orange colours on the lower lobe of the tail fin. It is caught withspinners, spoons and fly. It also takes float fished dough and termites.

== Electric Catfish ==
The Electric Catfish (Malapterurus electricus) occurs in the Nile (exclusive of Lake Victoria). It grows up to 1 metre in length and 20 kg in weight, and lives in rocky waters or roots and favours sluggish or standing water. It is most active at night, feeding mainly on fish stunned by electric shocks. The electric organ, capable of discharging 300–400 volts, is derived from pectoral muscle and surrounds almost the entire body. It is used both for prey capture and defense. Forms pairs and breeds in excavated cavities or holes.

== See also ==
- Fishing in Uganda

== Additional relevant literature ==
- Greenwood, Peter Humphry. "The fishes of Uganda." (1958).
- Akoth, Dorothy, Vianny Natugonza, Jackson Efitre, Fredrick Jones Muyodi, and Laban Musinguzi. "The non-Haplochromis fish fauna in Uganda: an update on the distribution and a review of data gaps." Environmental Monitoring and Assessment 195, no. 3 (2023): 412.
