= Veronica Kadogo =

Ugandan politician

Veronica Babirye Kadogo
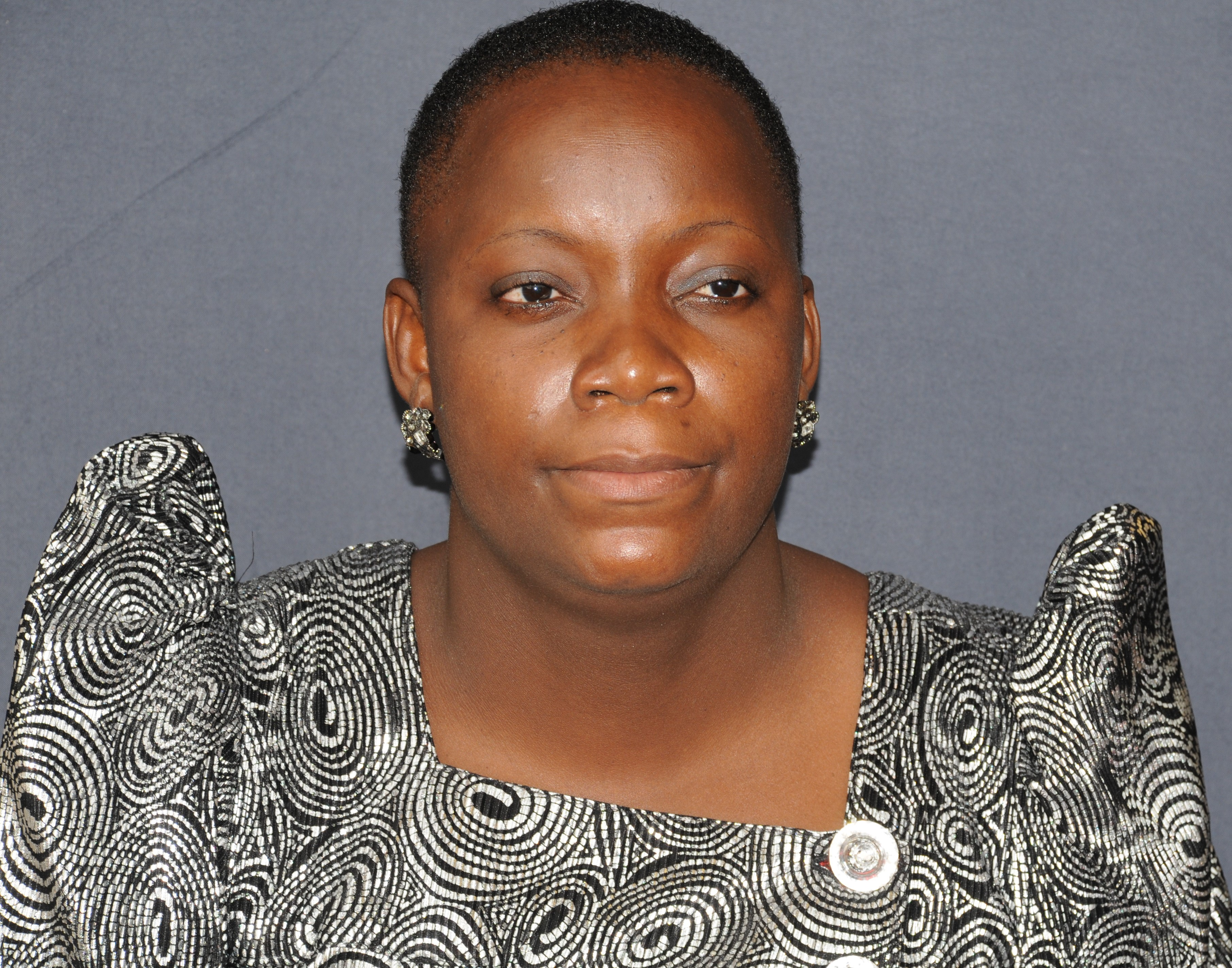
- Born: 13 March 1977 (age 48); Buyende District, Uganda
- Citizenship: Uganda
- Education: Kyambogo University (Diploma in Business Administration) (Bachelor of Management Science); Makerere University (Master of Business Administration)
- Occupation: Politician
- Years active: 2003 to present
- Known for: Politics
- Title: Member of Parliament for Buyende District Women' Constituency
- Spouse: (Mr.Kadogo)

Veronica Babirye Kadogo, (née Veronica Babirye), (born 13 March 1977) is a Ugandan politician who serves as the Member of Parliament representing the Buyende District Women' Constituency in the 10th Parliament (2016 to 2021).

== Background and education ==
She was born in Buyende District, in the Eastern Region of Uganda, on 13 March 1977. She attended primary and secondary schools in the Busoga sub-region of Uganda. She was admitted to Kyambogo University, where she graduated with a diploma in Business administration, in 2001. In 2005, the same university awarded her a Bachelor of Management Science degree. Her Master of Business Administration degree was received from Makerere University in 2010.

== Work experience ==
For seven years, from 2003 until 2010, she worked at Makerere University, Uganda's oldest and largest public university. She started out serving as a procurement officer, then as a records officer and finally as a store keeper.

== Political career ==
During the 2016 parliamentary elections Babirye was elected as the Woman Representative for Buyende District. One of the losers in that contest, Annet Mary Nakato, contested the result in court. The matter was settled on appeal, in the Court of Appeal of Uganda, when the court case was dismissed or lack of evidence.

In the 10th parliament, Ms Veronica Babirye Kadogo is Vice Chairperson of the Committee on East African Community Affairs. She is also a member of two other parliamentary committees, the parliamentary committee on Agriculture, Animal Industry and Fisheries and the parliamentary committee on Local Government Accounts. She was elected to the Pan African Parliament in 2016 where she took her seat with four other Ugandan MPs: Bangirana Kawooya Anifa, Professor Morris Ogenga Latigo, Felix Ogong and Jacqueline Amongin.

Bangirana Kawooya Anifa, Morris Ogenga Latigo, Felix Ogong

== Family ==
Veronica Babirye Kadogo is married.

== Other considerations ==
In November 2018, Veronica Babrirye Kadogo represented Uganda at the 11th Pan African Parliament Conference on the rights of Women in Kigali, Rwanda.

== See also ==
- Monica Azuba Ntege
- Winnie Kiiza
- Ruth Nankabirwa
- List of members of the tenth Parliament of Uganda
- Jacqueline Amongin
- Member of Parliament
- Buyende District Women' Constituency
- Parliament of Uganda
