= Joel Ssenyonyi =

Ugandan politician (born 1986)

Joel Besekezi Ssenyonyi
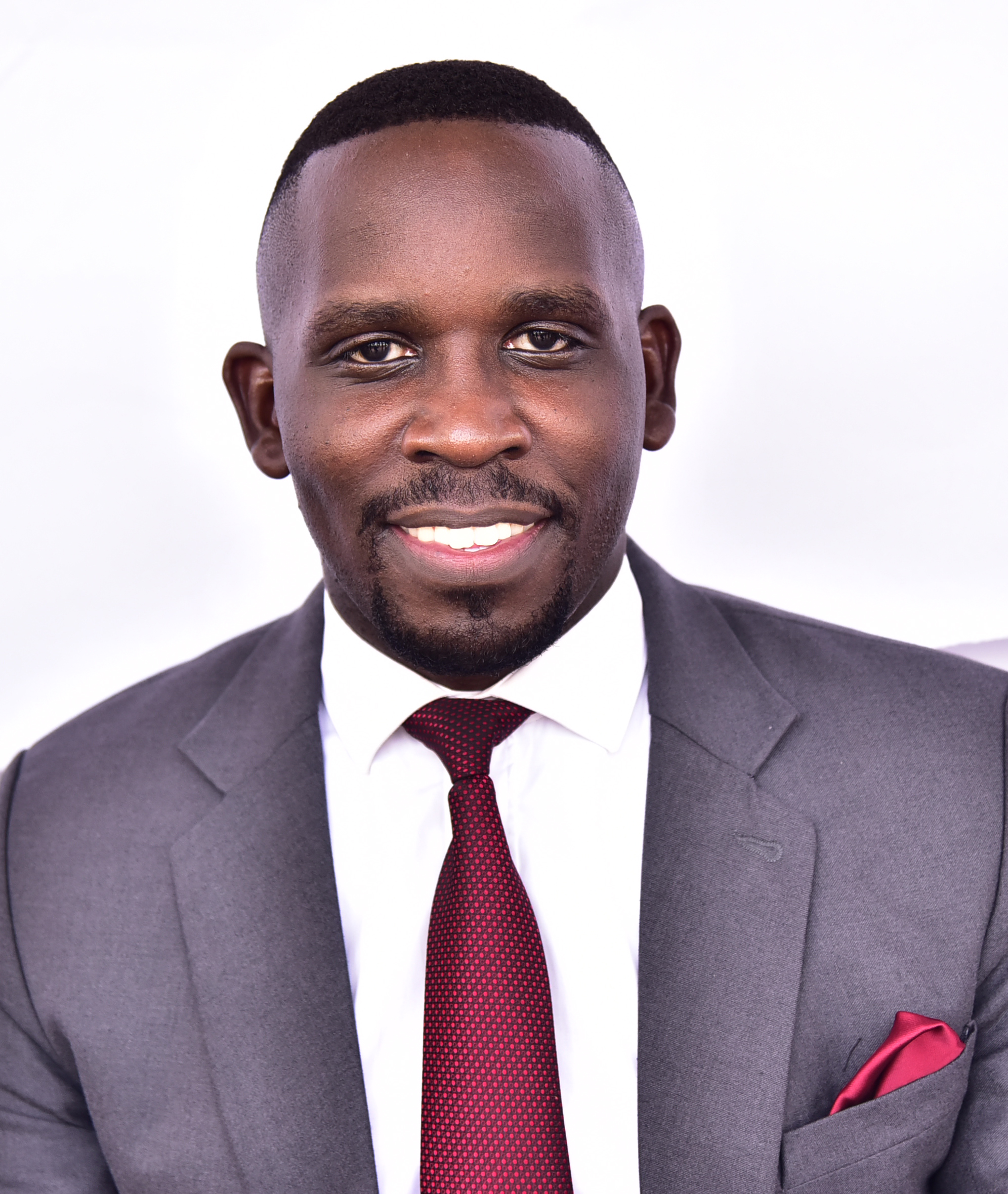

Leader of the Opposition
- Incumbent
- Assumed office 9 January 2024
- President: Bobi Wine
- Preceded by: Mathias Mpuuga

Member of Parliament for Nakawa West
- Incumbent
- Assumed office 24 May 2021
- Preceded by: Michael Kabaziguruka

Personal details
- Born: 20 December 1986 (age 39)
- Party: National Unity Platform
- Children: 2
- Education: Makerere University (Bachelor of Science in Business Statistics); Makerere University (Bachelor of Laws); Law Development Centre (Post Graduate Diploma in Legal Practice)

Joel Besekezi Ssenyonyi (born 20 December 1986) is a Ugandan journalist, lawyer and politician. He is the member of parliament for the Nakawa West constituency in Kampala and the leader of opposition in the Ugandan Parliament, a position that was previously held by Mathias Mpuga. He also serves as the Spokesperson of the National Unity Platform.

== Early life and education ==
Joel was born at Mulago National Referral Hospital in Kampala, Uganda. He attended several primary schools including Kazinda Memorial School Kyengera Mugongo, Namirembe Infant Primary School in Bakuli, Joy Primary School, and later Trinity Academy Primary School in Bukoto where he completed his Primary Leaving Examinations (PLE) in 1999. He joined St. Lawrence Citizens High School for his O-Level and A-Level education.

Ssenyonyi holds a Bachelor of Science in Business Statistics from Makerere University. He later pursued legal studies at the same institution, obtaining a Bachelor of Laws (LLB) degree. He completed the Postgraduate Diploma in Legal Practice from the Law Development Centre (LDC) in Kampala, qualifying him to practice law in Uganda. In 2025, he earned a Master of Arts in Organizational Leadership and Management from Uganda Christian University (UCU). His master's dissertation examined corruption and its effect on service delivery in Banda Parish, Nakawa West Constituency.

== Media career ==
During his Senior Six vacation in 2006, he began his media career at Uganda Broadcasting Corporation (UBC) as a news anchor before later joining NTV Uganda, where he gained wider national recognition as a journalist and television host. He transitioned into politics in 2019 when he was appointed spokesperson of the People Power movement led by Robert Kyagulanyi Ssentamu, also known as Bobi Wine.

== Political career ==
Ssenyonyi was elected as the NUP parliamentary candidate for the Nakawa West seat in the 2021 Ugandan general election. He won the seat after defeating the National Resistance Movement's Margret Zziwa Nantongo. He was appointed as Chairperson for the Committee on Commissions, Statutory Authorities and State Enterprises (COSASE) from 2021 to 2024.

He was appointed the Leader of Opposition in Parliament on 22 December 2023 and assumed office on 9 January 2024.

On 28 May 2026, Joel was again appointed Leader of Opposition in Parliament in the 12th Parliament of Uganda for the 2026 to 2031 term.

== Personal life ==
Joel Ssenyonyi is married to Febress Nagawa. The couple wedded in 2020 and have two children, a daughter and a son.

== See also ==
- Bobi Wine
- Mathias Mpuuga
- Winnie Kiiza
- Betty Aol Ochan
- Leader of the Opposition (Uganda)
