= Mathias Mpuuga =

Ugandan politician (born 1975)

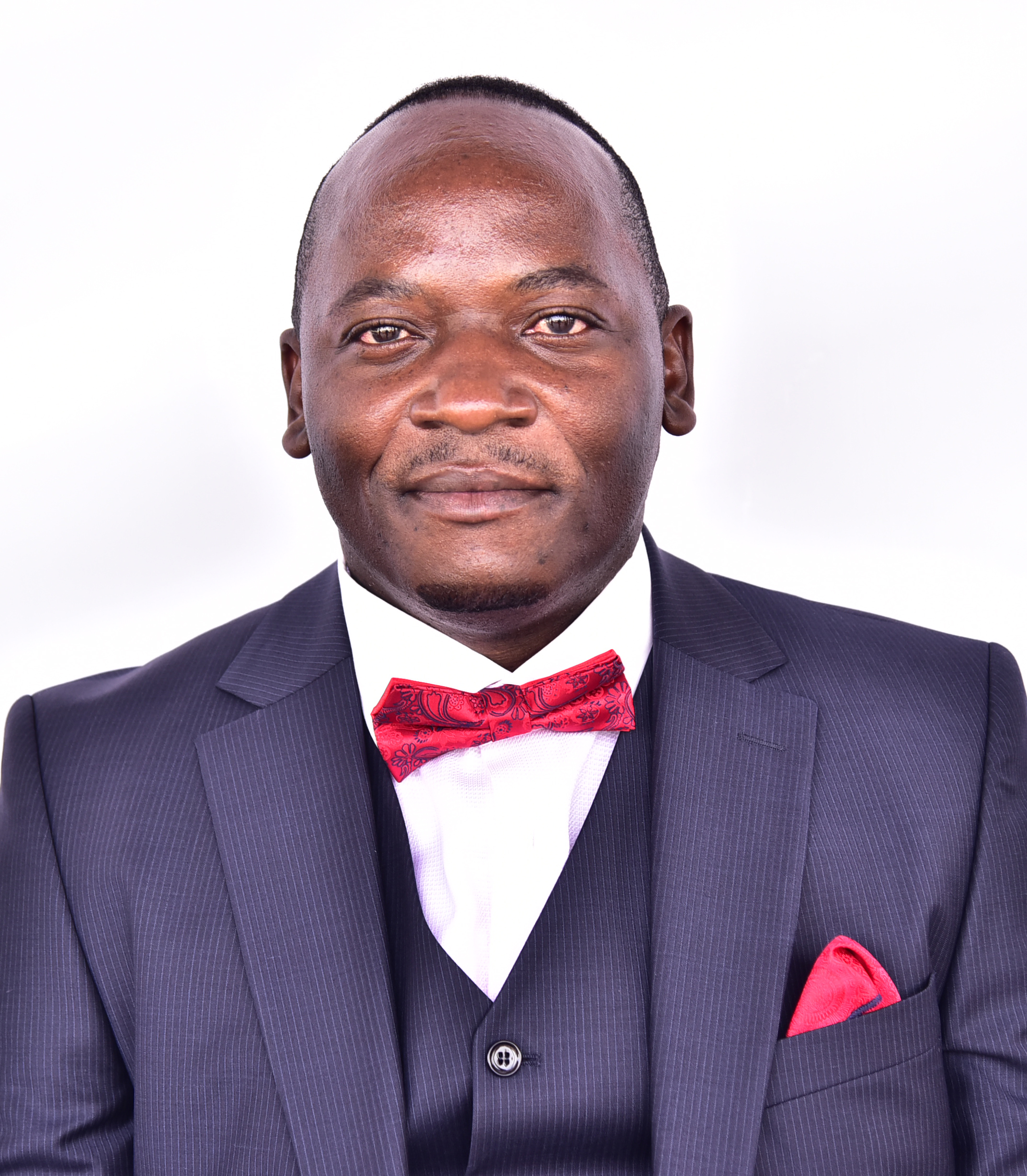
- Mpuuga in 2011

Leader of the Opposition
- In office 24 May 2021 – 9 January 2024
- President: Yoweri Museveni
- Preceded by: Betty Aol Ochan
- Succeeded by: Joel Ssenyonyi

Member of Parliament for Masaka
- Incumbent
- Assumed office May 2011
- Preceded by: Kawanga John Baptist

Personal details
- Born: 20 December 1986 (age 39) Lwengo District, Uganda
- Party: Democratic Alliance (since 2024)
- Other political affiliations: Democratic Party (2016–2021); National Unity Platform (2021-2024)
- Education: Makerere University (BA, MA); Law Development Centre (LLB)

Mathias Mpuuga Nsamba (born 12 October 1975) is a Ugandan politician, lawyer, and teacher who served as the Leader of the Opposition from 2021 to 2024. He served as the Member of Parliament for Masaka District from 2011 to 2021 and later represented Nyendo–Mukungwe Division from 2021 until his defeat in the 2026 general election. Mpuuga also served as deputy president of the National Unity Platform (NUP) political party of the central region led by Robert Kyagulanyi Ssentamu (Bobi Wine) from 2021 to 2024, and was a parliamentary commissioner during his tenure in the 11th Parliament.

== Early life and education ==
Mpuuga was born on 12 October 1975, in the present-day Lwengo District in Central Uganda, to the late Vincent Nsamba and Gertrude Nsamba.

Mpuuga went to Kyamaganda Boys Demonstration School for his primary education, which he completed in 1987, and joined Masaka Secondary School, completing his UCE exams in 1992. He enrolled at Nakyenyi Senior Secondary School for his A-level, finishing in 1994.

Mpuuga joined Makerere University where he pursued a Bachelor of Arts in Education degree in 2009. He also holds an MA in economics from Makerere University, and a Bachelor of Laws (LLB) degree he attained also from Makerere university in 2016. He later enrolled at the Law Development Centre (LDC), graduating with a postgraduate diploma in legal practice in 2020.

== Career ==
=== Outside politics ===
Mpuuga was a teacher at Uganda Martyrs High School, Rubaga, where he taught Geography and Economics from 1998 to 2003.

He was a director for Masaka Town College based in Masaka city from 2000 to 2002.

He was also a partner and managing director for Liberal Consult Ltd, an evaluation and monitoring firm that previously worked on contracts to monitor donor-funded projects in Uganda, from 2001 to 2004.

He was a principal and managing director for Datamine Technical Business School in Kampala from 2003 to 2011.

He was a youth chairperson at Masaka District Local Government from 2000 to 2011.

He has been a member on the University Council of Mutesa I Royal University since 2010.

== Political career ==
Mpuuga became active in politics in his first year at Makerere University. He was part of the group that founded the Uganda Young Democrats (UYD), a youth wing of the opposition Democratic Party of Uganda. He participated in the campaign of Paul Kawanga Ssemwogerere in the 1996 Uganda presidential election.

Mpuuga served as a member of the Buganda Kingdom Lukiiko (Parliament) between 1998 and 2010.

In 2011, he contested for election as member of Parliament for Masaka Municipality. He won the election and went on to represent Masaka Municipality until 2021.

During this period, he served as a member of the Public Accounts Committee (PAC) and the Appointments Committee - a committee of Parliament that vets presidential appointees. He also served as shadow minister for the Presidency and Anti-corruption (2011–2016), and Shadow Minister for Education (2016–2021).

In 2021, he was re-elected as member of Parliament representing Nyendo-Mukungwe Division. He is a former leader of the opposition in the Ugandan Parliament, having served from 2021 until January 2024. In 2025, Mpuuga officially left National Unity Platform and joined the Democratic Front. On 27 June 2025, he was endorsed by party delegates as the first president of the then newly formed Democratic Front. He contested again for the Nyendo-Mukungwe Parliamentary seat in the 2026 general election as Democratic Front's flag bearer, but lost the seat to National Unity Platform's flag bearer, Gyaviira Lubowa Ssebina.

Mpuuga filed a petition with his party Democratic Front challenging the results of the general 2026 elections in the constitutional court.
