= Hellen Adoa =

Ugandan politician (born 1977)

Hon Hellen Adoa
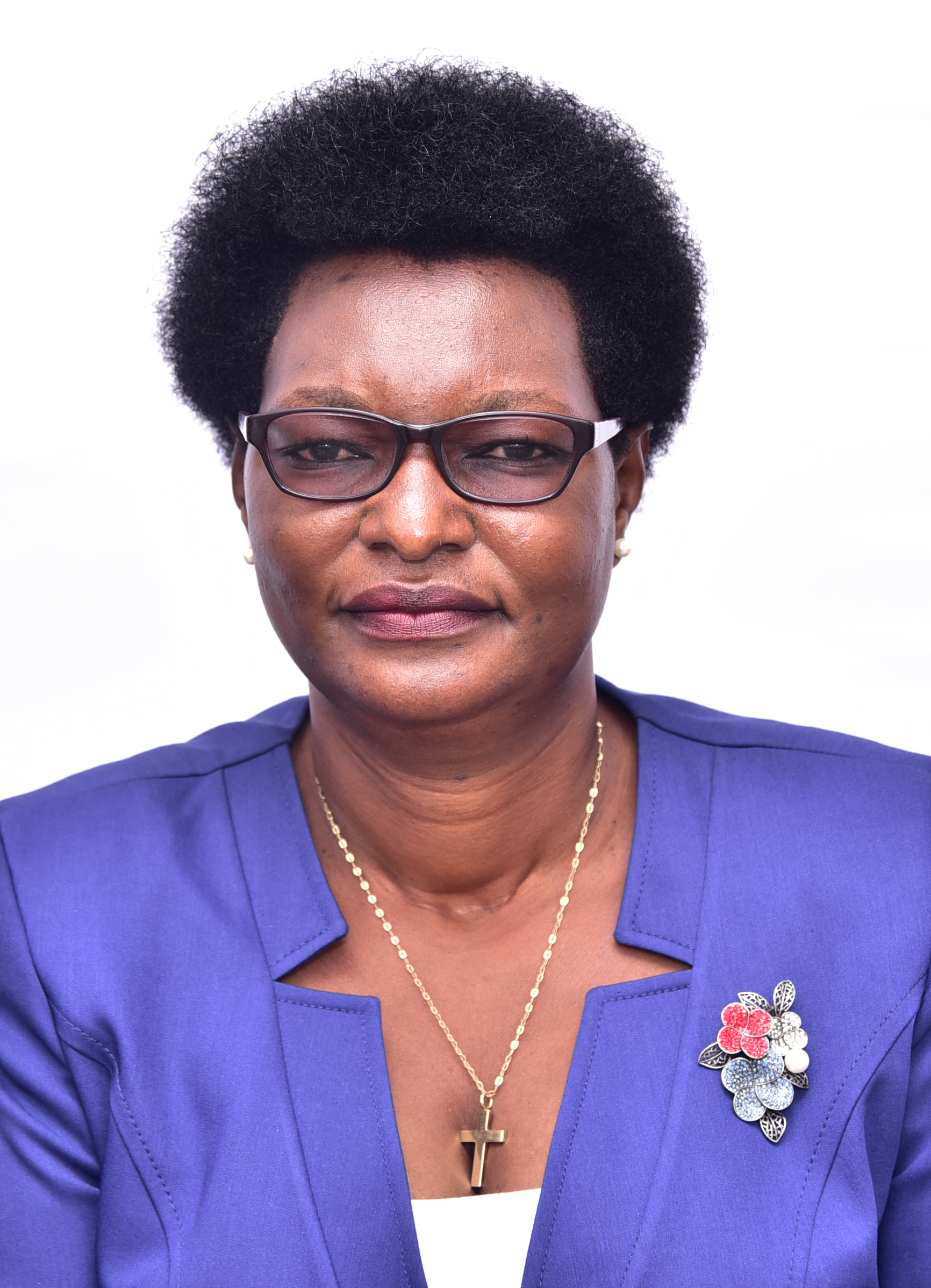
- Born: 25 January 1977 (age 49); Serere District, Uganda
- Citizenship: Uganda
- Education: Victoria Business Institute, Tororo (Diploma in Business Studies); Uganda Martyrs University (Diploma in Education Management) (Bachelor of Democracy and Development Studies) (Master of Local Governance and Human Rights)
- Occupation: Politician
- Years active: 2001 to present
- Known for: Politics
- Title: Member of Parliament for Serere District Women Constituency and Minister of State for Fisheries
- Spouse: (Married)

Hellen Adoa (born 25 January 1977) is a Ugandan politician who serves as the Member of Parliament representing the women in Serere District in the 11th Ugandan Parliament (2016 to date).

Effective 14 December 2019, she concurrently serves as the State Minister for Fisheries, in the Ugandan Cabinet.

She was appointed as the Minister of State for Agriculture, Animal Industry, and Fisheries (Fisheries) on 27 March 2024

== Early life and education ==
Hellen Adoa was born on 25 January 1977 in Serere District, in the Teso sub-region, Eastern Region of Uganda. She attended Kelim Primary School. She studied at Ngora Girls Secondary School, for her O-Level studies, graduating with a Uganda Certificate of Education, in 1992. In 1995, she completed her A-Level education at Ngora High School, graduating with a Uganda Advanced Certificate of Education.

She has two diplomas; one is, a Diploma in Business Studies, awarded by Victoria Business Institute, Tororo, and the other is, a Diploma in Education Management, from Uganda Martyrs University. Her first degree, a Bachelor of Democracy and Development Studies and her second degree, a Master of Local Governance and Human Rights, were both awarded by Uganda Martyrs University.

== Career ==
=== Early career ===
For a period of 15 years, from the beginning of 2001 until the end of 2015, Hellen Adoa served as director at various early childhood and elementary educational institutions, some of them co-owned by her. She also is a director at Halcyon High School.

=== Political career ===
She entered Uganda's elective politics by contesting for the Serere District Women Constituency parliamentary seat in 2016. She was elected, and is the current substantive member of parliament for that Serere District. She subscribes to the ruling National Resistance Movement political party.

On 14 December 2019, she was named in the cabinet of Uganda as the minister of state for Fisheries; a position she was appointed to by the Head of State of Uganda Yoweri Kaguta Museveni. She was sworn in as State Minister for Fisheries on 13 January 2020.

== See also ==
- Margaret Lamwaka Odwar
- Molly Nawe Kamukama
- Serere District
- List of members of the tenth Parliament of Uganda
- Parliament of Uganda
- Patrick Okabe
- Elijah Okupa
