= Teddy Ssezi Cheeye =

Ugandan journalist and publisher

- Born: October 8, 1958; Uganda
- Died: March 1, 2018 (aged 59); Kampala, Uganda
- Education: Kenya Institute of Mass Communication, London School of Economics and Political Science
- Occupations: Journalist, publisher, investigative reporter
- Years active: 1980s-2018
- Employer(s): New Vision; The Monitor
- Notable credit(s): Founder and editor of Uganda Confidential; Co-founder of The Monitor
- Political party: National Resistance Movement
- Spouse: Annet Kairaba
- Children: 3

Teddy Ssezi Cheeye (October 8, 1958 - March 1, 2018) was a Ugandan journalist, publisher, and investigative reporter who was considered one of the pioneers of investigative journalism in Uganda.

He was a former director of Economic Monitoring at the Internal Security Organisation (ISO), the founder and editor of Uganda Confidential, an investigative publication. He was also one of the founders of The Monitor newspaper alongside Ogen Kevin Aliro and Richard Tebere.

Cheeye was known for his bold reporting style and coverage of corruption and political affairs in Uganda.

== Early life and education ==
Cheeye was born on 8 October 1958, studied journalism at the Kenya Institute of Mass Communication, where he obtained a diploma in journalism. He later obtained a Master of Business Administration degree from the London School of Economics and Political Science.

== Journalism career ==
Cheeye began his journalism career in the 1980s, working with New Vision after the newspaper was established in 1986. He later worked in government communication roles, including as editor of Tarehe Sita, a publication of the National Resistance Army, before becoming an independent investigative journalist. In December 1990, Cheeye founded Uganda Confidential, an investigative newsletter. The publication gained attention for its confrontational style and contributed to the growth of investigative journalism in Uganda.

Cheeye was among the founders of The Monitor newspaper in 1992 alongside journalists including Charles Onyango Obbo, Wafula Oguttu, Ogen Kevin Aliro, Richard Tebere, David Ouma Balikowa and Jimmy Serugo. The newspaper later became one of Uganda's leading independent publications.

== Legal case ==
In 2009, Cheeye was convicted by Uganda's Anti-Corruption Court of embezzlement and forgery related to funds from the Global Fund to Fight AIDS, Tuberculosis and Malaria. The court found that he had misused funds amounting to Shs120 million that had been obtained through the Uganda Centre for Accountability for activities related to HIV/AIDS, tuberculosis and malaria programmes. He was sentenced to 10 years' imprisonment and ordered to compensate the Global Fund.

Cheeye appealed his conviction, but the Court of Appeal upheld the sentence in 2010. In 2011, the Supreme Court of Uganda dismissed his further appeal, upholding the convictions for embezzlement and forgery as well as the compensation order to the Global Fund.

The case attracted considerable public attention in Uganda because of Cheeye's previous profile as a journalist and public commentator. Following his release from prison, he discussed his conviction and imprisonment in interviews with several Ugandan media houses.

== Personal life ==
Cheeye married Annet Kairaba in 1986. The couple had three children: Arnold Sseezi Cheeye, Laura Sseezi Cheeye, and Lorna Sseezi Cheeye.

== Death ==
On 1 March 2018, Cheeye died after being knocked down by a motorcycle while walking in Nakawa, Kampala. He was 59 years old.
