= Gerald Ssendaula =

Ugandan politician

Gerald Majera Ssendawula
- Born: 15 October 1943 (age 83); Uganda
- Citizenship: Uganda
- Education: Nairobi University (BCom)
- Occupations: Farmer, politician, banker
- Years active: 1980–present
- Title: Chairman, Tropical Bank; Chairman, Uganda Revenue Authority; Director, NUCAFE

Gerald Majera Ssendaula (born 15 May 1943) is a retired Ugandan politician, and current banker and farmer. He is a former Cabinet Minister and MP Member of Parliament, representing Kingo sub-county, which became Lwengo District.

== Background and education ==
Ssendaula was born on 15 May 1943 in Kyabbogo Village, Kingo sub-county, in Masaka District at that time, to the late Edward Byansi Kalibbala and Maria Nakanwagi Nakato. He is the oldest amongst eight siblings; six brothers and two sisters. In 2010, Kingo sub-county was peeled off Masaka District to create Lwengo District.

He started his education at Kyoko Primary School, and then transferred to Nkoni Primary School. He continued his studies at St. Pius Junior Secondary School. Because his father was less interested in educating children, Ssendaula's mother applied for a Buganda Government scholarship to take the young Ssendaula to a reasonable school but without success.

He later met with Aga Ssekalala of Ugachick who was then a student of Senior Four but knew some Buganda Kingdom officials. Aga Ssekalala later introduced Ssendaula to the Mengo establishment, leading to the re-activation of his scholarship application in 1963. A scholarship of Shs905 then enabled him to join Namilyango College, where he studied from Senior One to Senior Six. He later joined Nairobi University in 1969 where he graduated with the Bachelor of Commerce degree. There were about 30 other Ugandans at Nairobi University during his time, including Livingstone Okello Okello (Chua County), FDC's Cecilia Ogwal (Dokolo Woman MP), and Professor Mondo Kagonyera.

== Work experience ==
After his studies in Kenya, Ssendaula returned to Barclays Bank in Uganda, where he had worked as a clerk during his S6 vacation. The two-year Barclays Bank London training known as 'Day Release' prepared him for an administrative role. He worked at the bank's Kabale branch before he was transferred to Nairobi to conduct some in-house training. He later returned to Uganda and rose to the rank of General Manager with Barclays Bank. He joined politics in 1980 and was elected MP for Bukoto, Masaka District, serving in that role until 1985, on the Democratic Party ticket, until 1985. He was elected Chairman of Masaka District in 1988 and served as such until 1992. In 1992, he was elected as the National Resistance Council (the Parliament of that time), representative for Bukoto, Masaka. He also contemporaneously served as the Chairman of Masaka Growers Cooperative Union.

== Political life ==
In 1980 Ssendaula joined politics as a Democratic Party (DP) supporter contesting for Parliament MP and got elected for Bukoto Central (presently Bukomansimbi and Masaka Municipality). With UPC in power and DP in opposition, Ssendaula was shadow spokesman for Housing, while Evaristo Nyanzi was for Finance.

In 1982, Ssendula's wife, Rosemary Nanyonga Nalongo, was shot dead at their grocery in Mpererwe, 5miles on Gayaza Road, opposite their home. It was 2 pm and Ssendaula was in Masaka working at his father's coffee farm in Kinoni. The crime of his wife was apparently opening her shop while Minister Samwiri Mugwisa was addressing a rally in Kawempe, moreover speaking about rebel activities in the country.

Mrs. Ssendaula tried to reason with the soldiers who attacked her, that Kawempe, where the rally was being held, was far away from Mpererwe where her shop was. They didn't listen, shooting her there and then. With the murder of his wife at the back of his mind, Ssendaula left his Mpererwe home joining the National Resistance Army when the rebels started capturing territory around 1984. It was Commander Victor Bwana, who persuaded him to join Museveni's forces and he was too angry with the UPC government to resist the temptation.

Ssendaula helped the rebels export coffee beans and hides to get some revenue since he was attached to the defunct Masaka Cooperative Union. At that time in 1984, the NRA had established a government in the captured territory as the Kampala – Masaka road was cut off by the rebels, with their headquarters in Fort Portal. Ssendaula served in this 'government' as a commissioner, the equivalent of a minister.

When the NRA captured power, he worked briefly at the National Resistance Movement (NRM) Secretariat, basically to wind up the rebels' export business as there was now a government to take care of it. In 1987, he went to Masaka, contested and got elected district chairman as its first District chairman under the NRM. He later joined the expanded National Resistance Council (NRC) legislature in 1989 as Bukoto MP.

In 1990, President Museveni appointed Ssendaula deputy minister of Commerce and Co-operatives under Richard Kaijuka, another banker. In 1996, he was promoted full minister for Natural Resources. At the beginning of 1998, Ssendaula became Minister of Finance, Planning and Economic Development, a position he held until his retirement in 2005.

He joined politics representing the Democratic Party where he was the Member of Parliament for Bukoto constituency then the largest constituency in Uganda from 1980–1985 which was split into, Bukoto Central, Bukoto South, Bukoto Mid West later remaining as the MP for Bukoto South in then Masaka District.

He was elected on a Democratic Party ticket switching to the political setting, NRM – Movement. He continued to become a Cabinet Minister in the Museveni Government as the Deputy Minister of Commerce and Cooperatives, which Ministry was changed and Named Ministry of Trade and Industries from 1991–1996. He rose to full Minister as the Minister of Natural Resources and Environment from 1996–1998, where he was transferred to The Ministry of Finance, Planning and Economic Development as its head through 1998–2005, where he retired from active politics.

== Other considerations ==
As of February 2015, he is a full-time farmer based in Masaka. He is also an Adviser to President Museveni on Financial Matters. He serves as a Consultant to the World Bank. He is the Chairman Uganda Revenue Authority, Chairman Board of Directors Tropical Bank, Director in Umeme Ltd and NUCAFE. He was married to Grace Tereza Nabatanzi Ssendawula, the daughter of Paul Kawanga Ssemogerere, the Ugandan Democratic Party politician. She died in 2011
