= Mary Annet Nakato =

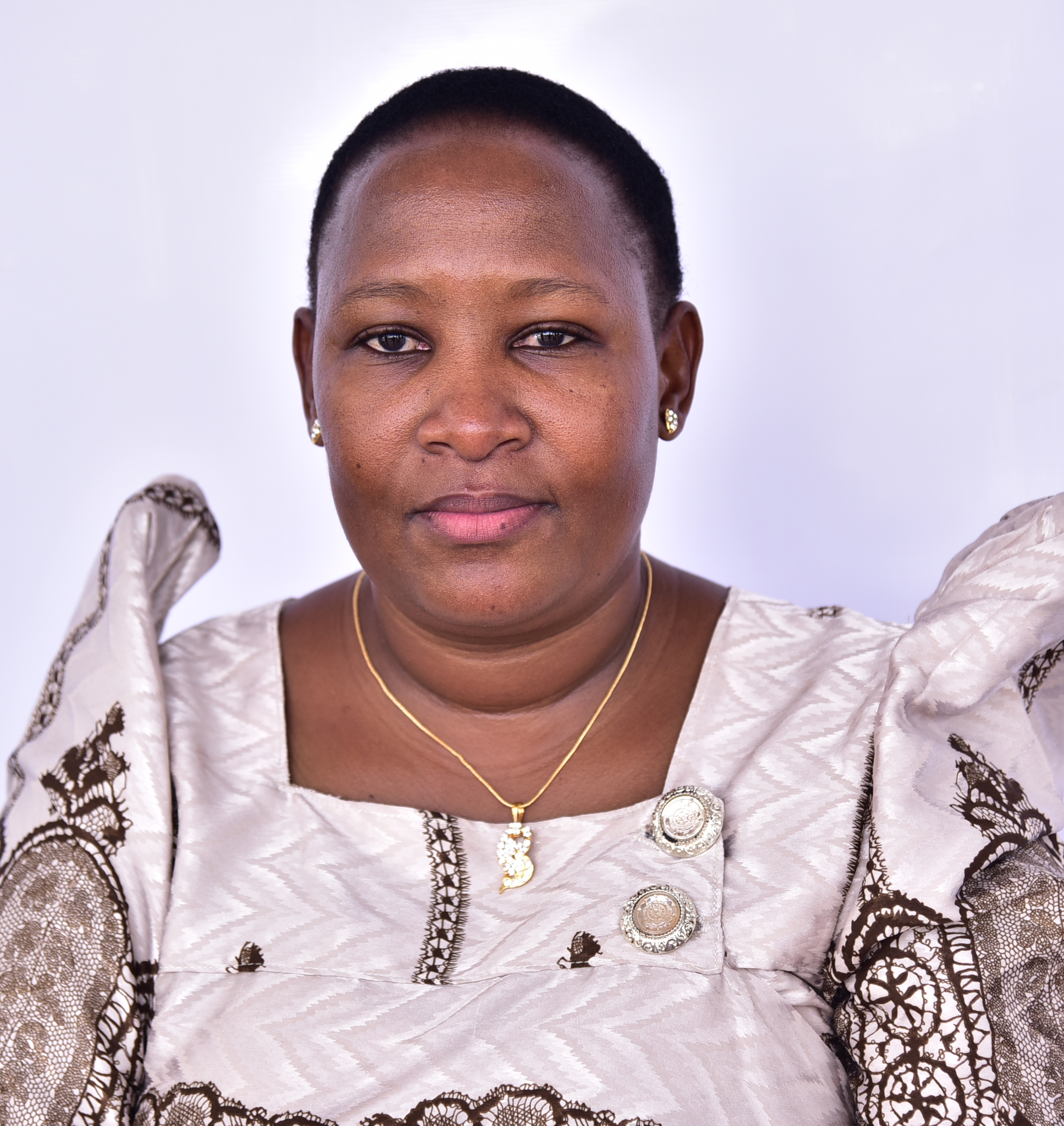
- Mary Annet Nakato

Woman Member of Parliament for Buyende District
- Incumbent
- Assumed office 2021

Personal details
- Party: Independent

Mary Annet Nakato is a Ugandan politician and Buyende District women's representative in the eleventh Parliament of Uganda as an Independent candidate. She is a writer and an activist on gender related studies. She represents the people of Buyende at the Parliament of Uganda.

== Political career ==
She belongs to the Budget Committee, Health Committee, National Economy Committee, and Physical Infrastructure Committee at the Parliament of Uganda.

== See also ==
- Veronica Kadogo
- List of members of the eleventh Parliament of Uganda
- Anita Among
- Thomas Tayebwa
- Nobert Mao
