= Leader of the Opposition (Uganda) =

Leader of the largest opposition party

- Coat of Arms of Uganda

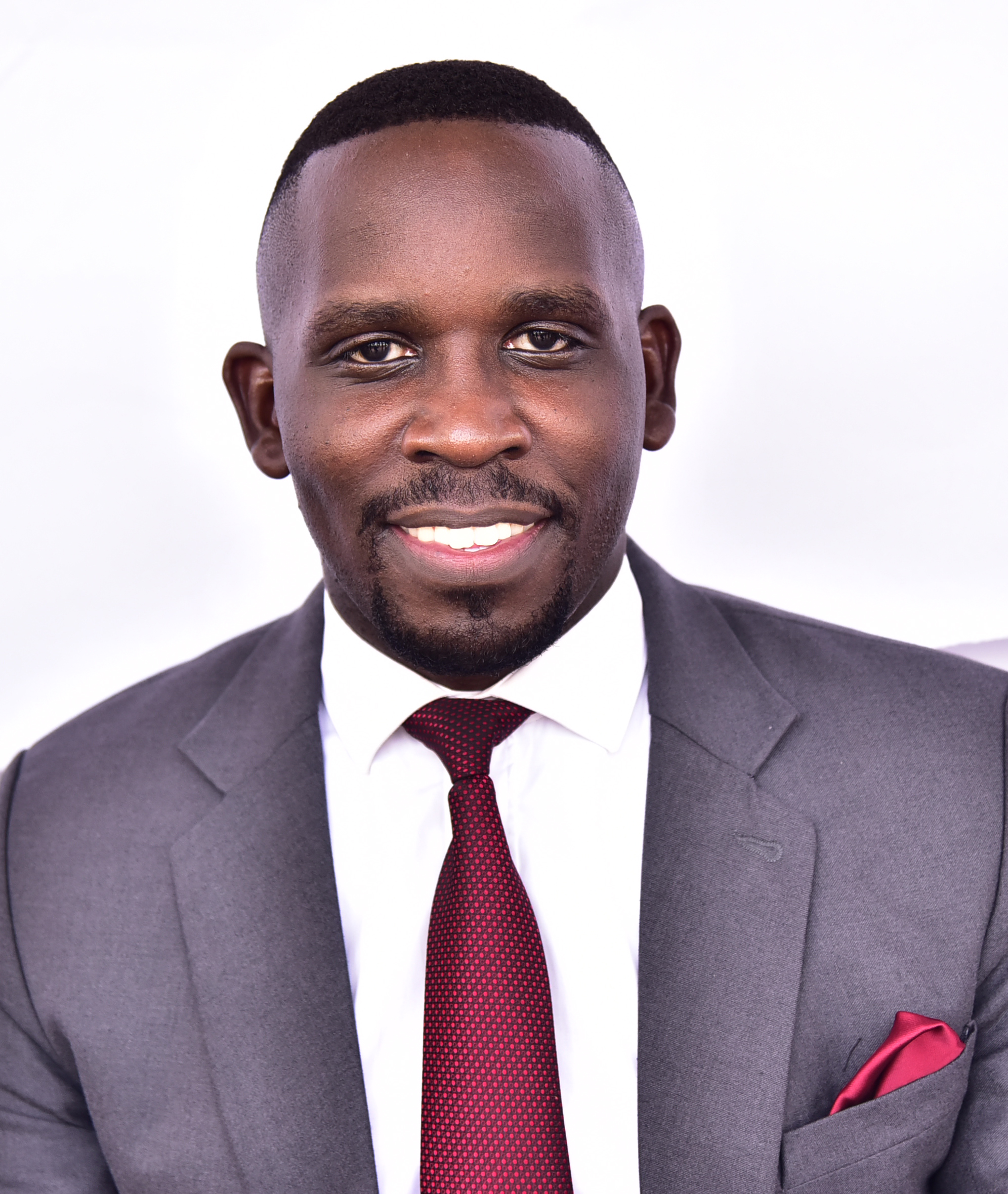
- Incumbent; Joel Ssenyonyi
- Member of: Parliament
- Appointer: Largest political party in Parliament that is not in government
- Term length: While leader of the largest political party in Parliament that is not in government
- Inaugural holder: Milton Obote
- Formation: April 1961

In Uganda, the Leader of the Opposition (LOP) is the leader of the largest political party in the Parliament of Uganda that is not in government. The Leader of the Opposition appoints and heads an alternative shadow cabinet whose duty it is to challenge and influence governmental actions and legislation on the floor of Parliament.

The current Leader of the Opposition is Joel Ssenyonyi of the National Unity Platform.

== History of the opposition in the Parliament of Uganda ==
=== Pre-independence ===
After Uganda was colonised in 1894 as a British Protectorate, the British rulers introduced the Legislative Council (Legco) in 1921, whose overall mission was to enact appropriate laws for the protectorate. However, it was not until 1945 that the first 3 indigenous Ugandans were allowed to sit in the Legco. When the struggle for independence intensified in the early 1950s, an opposition side in the Legco began to emerge.

In 1958, the first direct legislative elections were held, and the position of "Leader of the Opposition" was formally established. The major concern of the opposition during these years was preparing the country for independence, including the drafting of an appropriate national constitution.

In March 1960, Milton Obote became the first president of the Uganda People's Congress (UPC), which was born from the merger of the Uganda National Congress (UNC) and the Uganda People's Union (UPU). This event further strengthened Obote's position in national politics. After the 1961 general elections enabled the Legco to be transformed into the "National Assembly" and saw the Democratic Party (DP) rise to power, Obote became the first Ugandan Leader of the Opposition. On 1 March 1962, DP leader Ben Kiwanuka became the 1st Prime Minister of Uganda. Unfortunately, two months later, the DP lost power in the 1962 general elections, in which Obote's UPC won with the assistance of the Kabaka Yekka (KY) party in Buganda. In May 1962, Obote became the 2nd Prime Minister and the National Assembly was converted into a Parliament. Subsequently, Milton Obote became the first executive President of Uganda from 1966 to 1971.

=== Post-independence ===
During the first four years since independence (1962–1966), the DP was the only party in the opposition benches in Parliament, and the party not only had to fight against the injustices of the UPC-KY coalition government but also for its own survival. The Leader of the Opposition at the time was Basil Kiiza Bataringaya, the then secretary general of the DP, hailing from Western Uganda in what was then known as the Bushenyi District. But after the abrogation of the 1962 Constitution in Parliament and the collapse of the UPC-KY alliance in May 1964, Bataringaya crossed over to UPC with a number of his fellow DP MPs, leaving the opposition heavily depleted.

Between 1964 and 1971, the Leader of the Opposition was Alex Latim from Gulu, who replaced Bataringaya as the DP secretary general. In the following years, Latim together with his fellow DP colleagues and some KY and UPC members who had defected to the opposition, continued to represent the opposition. The opposition vehemently opposed the harsh detention laws which had been imposed in the country, emerging corruption in the Obote regime, and shift towards one-party rule.

=== The fall and rise of Obote ===
The Parliament of Uganda effectively ceased to function for 8 years when General Idi Amin seized power in a coup d'état in January 1971. The Amin regime preferred to rule through decrees and regular military announcements. As a result, most UPC and DP politicians went underground or kept a very low profile, while others fled into exile. Obote himself fled to Tanzania.

Following the overthrow of the Amin regime in April 1979 by Tanzanian troops and some Ugandan exiles, Parliament was restored under the name National Consultative Council (NCC), whose responsibilities not only included enacting new laws for the country, but also supervising the executive systematically in order to prevent the reemergence of dictatorial rule. The NCC, however, did not divide itself into "government" and "opposition" sides. Instead it operated as a multi-party umbrella organisation under Uganda National Liberation Front (UNLF), which sought to reach consensus on each issue on a non-ideological and non-party basis.

The first post-independence elections were held in December 1980, during which Obote and the UPC were voted into power. Although the results of the elections were hotly contested, DP leader Dr. Paul Kawanga Ssemogerere and his fellow DP MPs reluctantly accepted to sit in the opposition benches. Dr. Ssemogerere thus became Uganda's 5th Leader of the Opposition. The opposition vociferously condemned the escalation of Uganda's external debt, general insecurity and violations of basic human rights of ordinary Ugandans. They were also alleged to be sympathetic to guerrilla movements predominantly in the Luweero Triangle, including the National Resistance Movement (NRM) led by future president Yoweri Kaguta Museveni, the Uganda Freedom Movement (UFM) led by Andrew Kayira, and the Uganda Freedom Fighters (UFF) led by Robert Serumaga.

=== Second fall of Obote and rise of NRM ===
In July 1985, Milton Obote and his second UPC government were once again overthrown in a military coup led by General Tito Okello Lutwa, who also shut down Parliament. However, after the NRM seized power six months later, it was re-opened in February 1986 under a new name, the National Resistance Council (NRC), a month after the NRM seized power. As was the case in the NCC from 1979 to 1980, there was no official opposition in the NRC. The NRC was originally the supreme policy organ of the NRM during the Ugandan Bush War, and was the same group that constituted itself into a Parliament, maintaining the name of NRC.

After the 1996 presidential and parliamentary elections, the NRC was renamed Parliament, but until 2006, said Parliament and the whole of Uganda operated under a disguised single-party state called the "Movement System" that would later be defined in the High Court as a one-party state. As a result, there was no parliamentary opposition (and thus no formally recognized Leader of the Opposition) in Parliament from July 1985 to May 2006.

=== Return to multiparty system ===
What acted as opposition during this period were associations such as the Young Parliamentary Group and the Parliamentary Forum (PAFO). Faced with both national and international pressures, president Museveni was forced to open up the Ugandan political space. In 2005, a referendum was held to make Uganda a multi-party democracy, and 92% of voters voted to return to multi-party politics. The 2006 general elections were thus the first multi-party elections in 20 years.

In this election, the Forum for Democratic Change (FDC) emerged as the main opposition party. Subsequently, Prof. Morris Ogenga Latigo from Acholi became the 6th Leader of the Opposition in the 8th Parliament of Uganda.

As MP for Agago County, Prof. Latigo led the Opposition in the House at a time when politicians in Uganda were still reeling from the after effects of the Movement System, in which members operated on individual merit. Transforming from that system into the loyalty and discipline that multipartyism demands was difficult and it counts for some of the many challenges that Latigo's leadership faced in the 8th Parliament.

Prof. Latigo did not make it to the 9th Parliament after a hotly contested election campaign exercise that saw the military take charge of some parts of the election process leaving him and his supporters crying foul.

After the February 2011 Presidential and Parliamentary elections, Nathan Nandala Mafabi became the seventh Leader of the Opposition, six years after the return of multiparty politics under Museveni's regime. Hon. Mafabi was challenged with leading a minority opposition against a large number of the ruling NRM Members.

In the two years of his tenure however, Hon. Mafabi saw through immense successes especially in legislative product among which were the two hotly contested Bills, i.e. the Public Order Management Bill and the Anti-Money Laundering Bill. Hon. Mafabi was however not able to complete a full five-year term in office. The mandatory review that came after two and a half years saw him leave office amidst high tensions largely played in the media. The media tensions resulted from the FDC Party Presidential race which was hotly contested by Hon. Nandala Mafabi, the Leader of the Opposition and (Rtrd) Major General Mugisha Muntu was declared winner of the race. Mafabi challenged the results through the party structures and the dispute became a hot media issue leading to a difficult era of the leadership in the party.

As the midterm review of the leadership in Parliament, the FDC Party President, Gen. Mugisha Muntu replaced Hon. Mafabi with Hon. Philip Wafula Oguttu, the MP for Bukoli Central to serve in the remaining period of the term.

== List of leaders of the opposition ==
#	Name	Portrait	Party	Took office	Left office
1	Milton Obote		Uganda People's Congress	April 1961	April 1962
2	Basil Kiiza Bataringaya		Democratic Party	April 1962	1964
3	Alexander Alija Latim		Democratic Party	1964	1971
Position vacant from 1971 to December 1980
4	Paul K. Ssemogerere		Democratic Party	December 1980	July 1985
Single-party state from July 1985 to 2006
5	Morris Ogenga Latigo		Forum for Democratic Change	2006	2010
6	Nathan Nandala Mafabi		Forum for Democratic Change	2011	2013
7	Philip Wafula Oguttu		Forum for Democratic Change	2013	2015
8	Winnie Kiiza		Forum for Democratic Change	2015	2018
9	Betty Aol Ochan		Forum for Democratic Change	2018	2021
10	Mathias Mpuuga		National Unity Platform	2021	2024
11	Joel Ssenyonyi		National Unity Platform	2024	Present
