= Beatrice Atim Anywar =

Ugandan politician

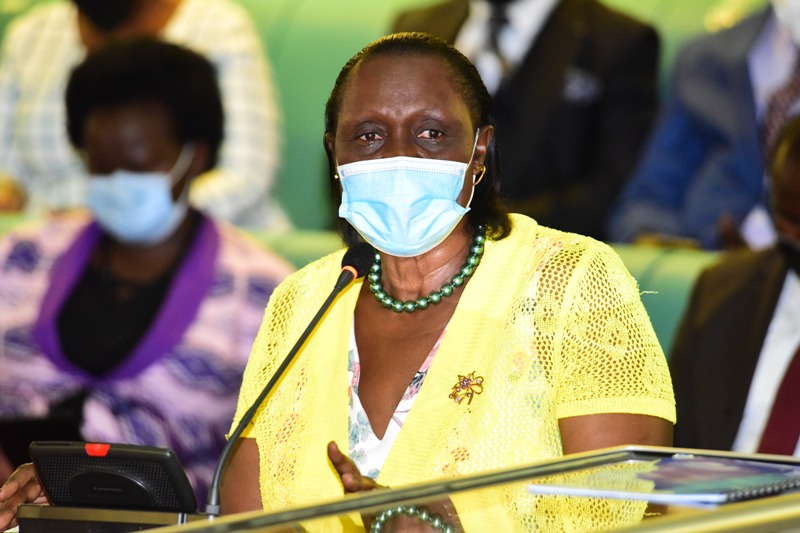
- Born: 9 January 1964 (age 62); Kitgum, Uganda
- Citizenship: Uganda
- Education: Makerere University Business School (Advanced Diploma in Marketing); Islamic University in Uganda (Bachelor of Public Administration); Makerere University (Master of Public Administration and Management); Marquette University (Certificate in Democracy and Good Governance)
- Occupation: Politician
- Years active: 1991 to present
- Known for: Politics
- Title: Member of Parliament for Kitgum Municipality and Minister of state for Environment
- Spouse: (Divorced)

Beatrice Atim Anywar (née Beatrice Atim), also Betty Anywar (born 9 January 1964), is a Ugandan politician who is the Minister of State for Water and Environment (Environment). She served as the Member of Parliament representing the Kitgum Municipality Constituency in the 10th Ugandan Parliament (2016 to 2021). Effective 14 December 2019, she concurrently serves as the State Minister for the Environment, in the Ugandan Cabinet. She replaced Dr. Mary Goretti Kitutu, who was appointed Minister of Energy and Minerals, in the same cabinet.

== Early life and education ==
Beatrice was born in Kitgum District, in the Acholi sub-region, in the Northern Region of Uganda, on 9 January 1964. In 1991, she graduated with an Advanced Diploma in Marketing, from Makerere University Business School. In 2004, she received a Bachelor of Public Administration degree from the Islamic University in Uganda. Her degree of Master of Public Administration and Management was awarded by Makerere University, the oldest and largest public university in Uganda. She also has a Certificate in Democracy and Good Governance, Obtained from Marquette University, in the United States.

== Career ==
=== Before politics ===
For a period of over two years, from 1991 until 1993, Beatrice Anywar worked as the Depot Manager at a company called UFEL Uganda. Then for the next two years, 1994 and 1995, she worked as Senior Marketing Officer at Vitafoam Uganda Limited, a mattress manufacturing company. After that, she worked in the commercial customer care office of the National Water and Sewerage Corporation, serving there for eight years, from 1996 until 2004.

=== Political career ===
==== In the FDC political party ====
She entered Uganda's elective politics by contesting for the Kitgum Municipality Constituency parliamentary seat in 2006. She was elected, defeating the National Resistance Movement candidate Santa Okot.

== Environmental activism ==
She was appointed as the shadow minister for the environment during her first term in parliament, due to her environmental activism.

She became well-known for her work to save the Mabira Forest in Uganda. The president, Yoweri Museveni, and the government had, prior to her work, decided to sell the forest to the sugar company Sugar Corporation of Uganda Limited (SCOUL) to cut it down and convert it into a sugar cane plantation for ethanol production. Atim fought along with, for example, the National Association of Professional Environmentalists to stop the felling, and organised a boycott of SCOUL's sugar.

In 2007, about 100,000 Ugandans demonstrated in a demonstration called the "Save Mabira Crusade" against the president and military to save the forest. Three people died, and many were hurt. Atim Anywar's house was besieged by military and police, and she was imprisoned for terrorism.

=== As an independent politician ===
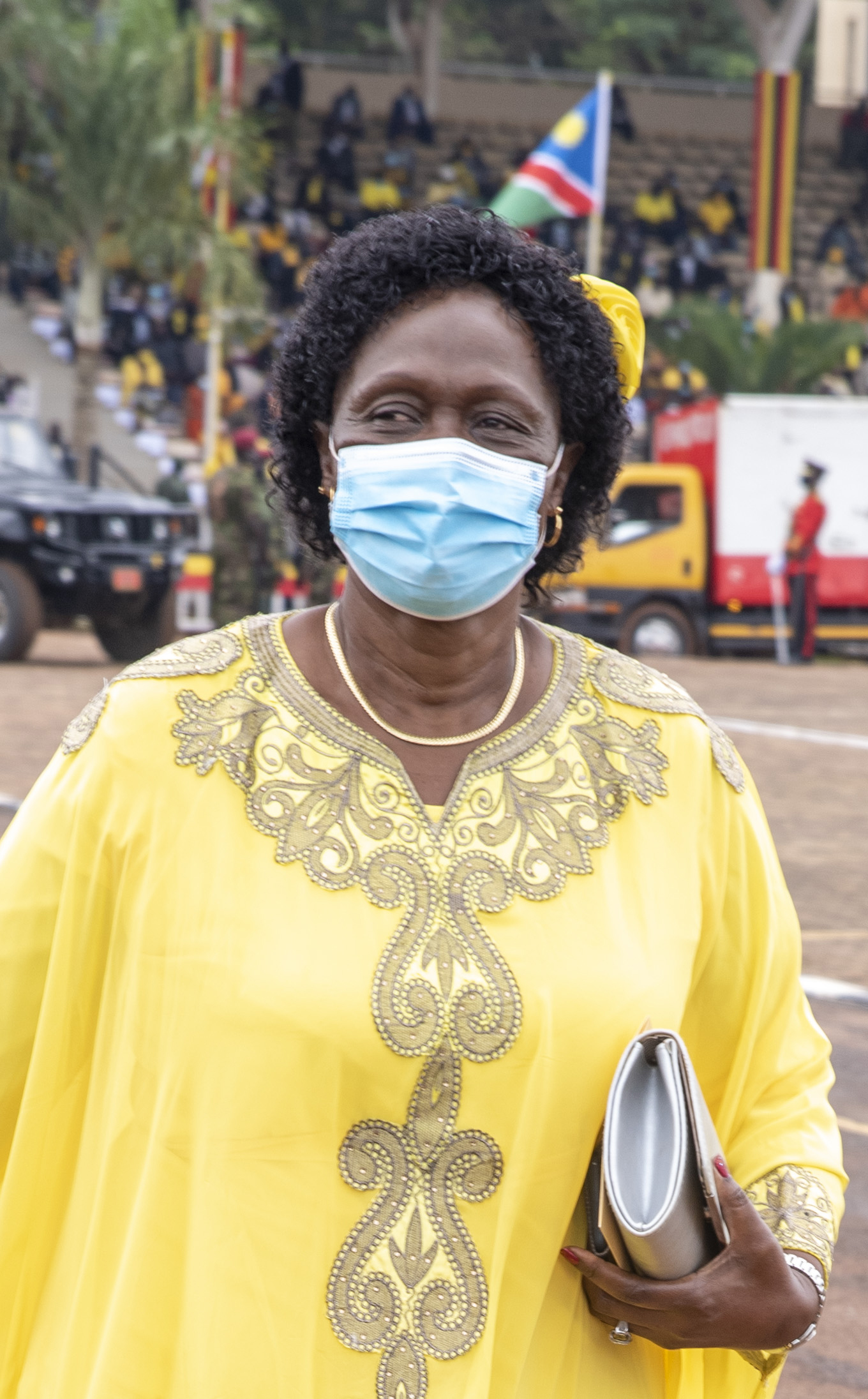
Beatrice Anywar

During the 2016 parliamentary election cycle, Anywar lost the Forum for Democratic Change primaries. She ran as an independent political candidate. She won the parliamentary seat, with a comfortable margin, beating several high-profile opponents.

In December 2017, during the parliamentary vote to remove presidential age limits, Beatrice Atim Anywar voted "Yes", to the chagrin of opposition politicians.

On 14 December 2019, she was named in the cabinet of Uganda as the minister of state for Environment; a position she was appointed to by the Head of State of Uganda Yoweri Kaguta Museveni.

=== In the NRM political party ===
During the 2026 general elections, she contested for the Kitgum Municipality Constituency parliamentary seat under the National Resistance Movement party flag. She lost to FDC's Daniel Onekalit Amere who garnered 6,176 votes against her 5,013 votes however, she challenged his election through petitioning in the high court.

== See also ==
- Margaret Lamwaka Odwar
- Winnie Kiiza
- Cabinet of Uganda
- Cabinet of Rwanda
