= Beti Kamya =

Ugandan politician & businesswoman

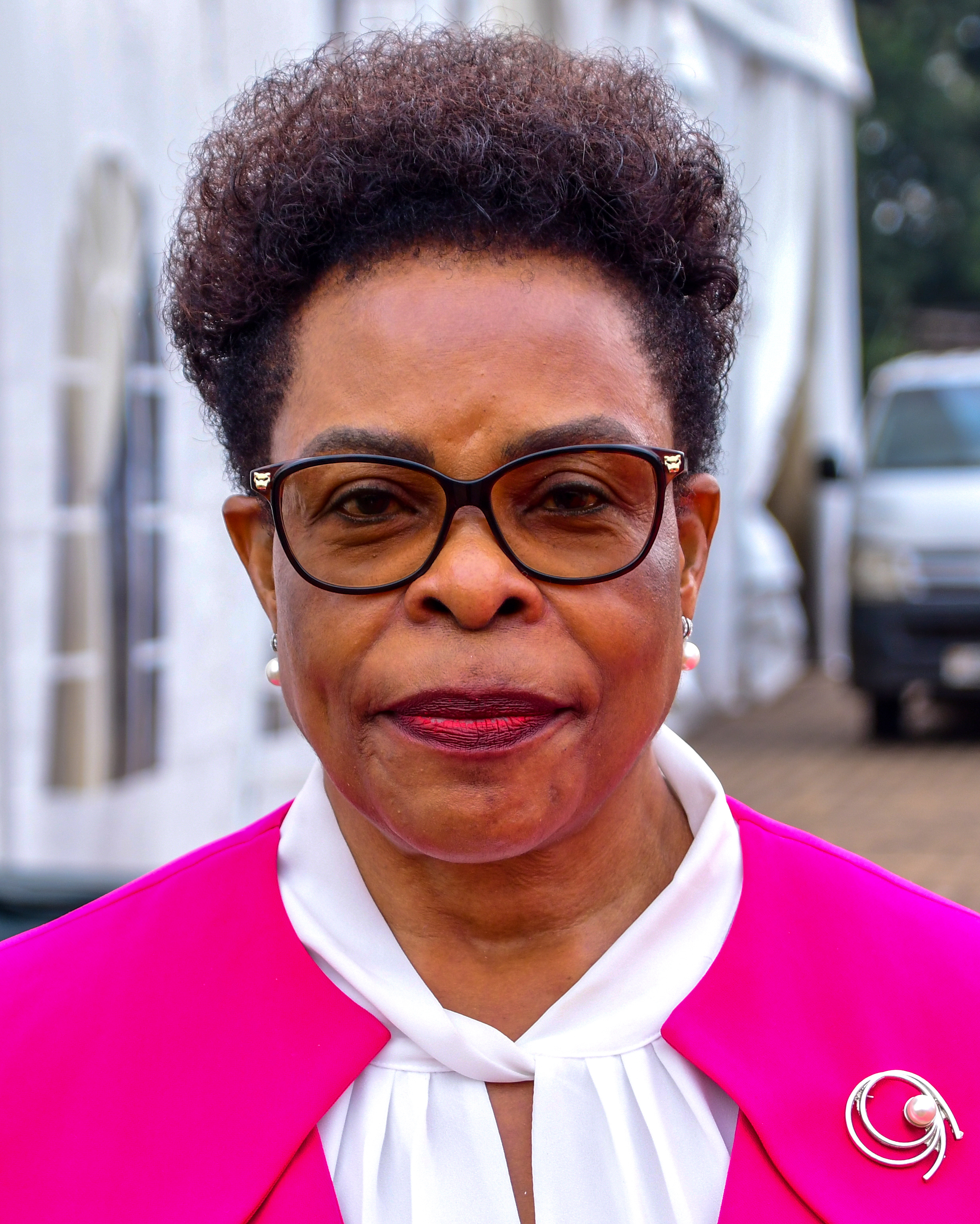
- Born: 30 November 1955 (age 70); Nakuru, Kenya
- Citizenship: Uganda
- Education: McKay Memorial School, Kampala; Saint Hellen's Primary School; Wanyange Girls' School; Kings College Budo
- Alma mater: Makerere University (Bachelor of Commerce)
- Occupations: Businesswoman and politician
- Years active: 1988 - present
- Known for: Politics
- Title: Uganda's Inspector General of Government (IGG)
- Political party: National Resistance Movement
- Spouse: Spencer Turwomwe (died 2003)
- Children: 6

Beti Olive Namisango Kamya-Turomwe (born 30 November 1955), also known as Beti Kamya, is a businesswoman and politician in Uganda. She was the Inspector General of Government in Uganda.

== Background ==
Previously, from December 2019 until May 2021, she was the Cabinet Minister of Lands, Housing and Urban Development, in the Cabinet of Uganda.

Before that, from 6 June 2016 until 14 December 2019, she served as the Minister for Kampala Capital City Authority in Uganda's cabinet.

She is the founder and president of the Uganda Federal Alliance (UFA), one of the registered political parties in the country. She was a candidate in the 2011 Ugandan presidential elections, coming in fifth with 52,782 votes. She previously served as the Member of Parliament representing Lubaga North Constituency on the Forum for Democratic Change (FDC) ticket from 2006 until 2010.

Kamya joined the National Resistance Movement party and in 2020 she participated in the flag bearer elections for Lubaga North constituency as a candidate. She beat Brian Tindyebwa and Dr. Isaac Lwanga to become the official NRM flag bearer in the 2021 presidential and parliamentary elections.

In the 2021 general elections, Kamya lost the Lubaga North parliamentary election to Ababaker Kawalya of the National Unity Platform (NUP) a party under the chairmanship of Robert Kyagulanyi Sentamu.

== Early life and education ==
Beti Kamya was born in Nakuru, Kenya on 30 November 1955 to George Wilson Kamya, a Ugandan, and Margaret Wairimu Kamya, a Kenyan. Beti was the fourth born of nine children. In 1961, when Beti was six years old, the family relocated to Uganda.

She attended McKay Memorial School in Kampala and Saint Hellen's Primary School in Western Uganda for her elementary schooling. She then attended Wanyange Girls' School for her O-Level education and Kings College Budo for her A-Level education. She studied at Makerere University, the oldest and largest public university in the country, graduating with a Bachelor of Commerce degree in marketing.

== Career ==
=== Beginnings ===
In the mid 1980s, Beti Kamya joined Uganda Leather and Tanning Industries Limited in Jinja in the sales department, working there until 1988. She then joined Nyanza Textiles Industries Limited, working there as a sales executive until 1992. She then relocated to Kampala, Uganda's capital and largest city with her husband.

From 1996 until 1999, she worked as the marketing manager at Uganda Breweries Limited in Port Bell, a Kampala suburb. From 1999 until 2004, she was the executive director of the Uganda Wildlife Education Centre (UWEC) in Entebbe, about 36 kilometres (22 mi), by road, south of Kampala on the northern shores of Lake Victoria.

Between 2001 and 2004, while still at UWEC, she became an official in the political pressure group Reform, Agenda, the precursor of the FDC political party. From 2005 until 2010, she served as the special envoy of the FDC president Kizza Besigye. She also served as the elected member of parliament for Lubaga North Constituency on the FDC ticket. In January 2010, she quit the FDC and formed the UFA, becoming its first president.

=== Appointment to cabinet ===
On 6 June 2016, Betty Kamyas named as the new Minister for Kampala Capital City Authority in the new Cabinet announced that day. In a cabinet reshuffle on 14 December 2019, she was named the Minister of Lands, Housing and Urban Development, switching dockets with Betty Amongi, who took over at Kampala Capital City Authority.

Former IGG

As of 7 October 2025, Betty Kamya has been replaced with High Court Judge Aisha Naluzze Batala as Uganda's new IGG by president Museveni. Betty's four year term of office expired last month, September 22, but her deputies have been retained. The names of the appointees have been sent to Parliament for vetting.

== Personal life ==
Kamya was married to Spencer Turwomwe, a soldier in the Ugandan military. He died in 2003. Together, they had six children.
