= Jacqueline Amongin =

Ugandan MP (born 1982)

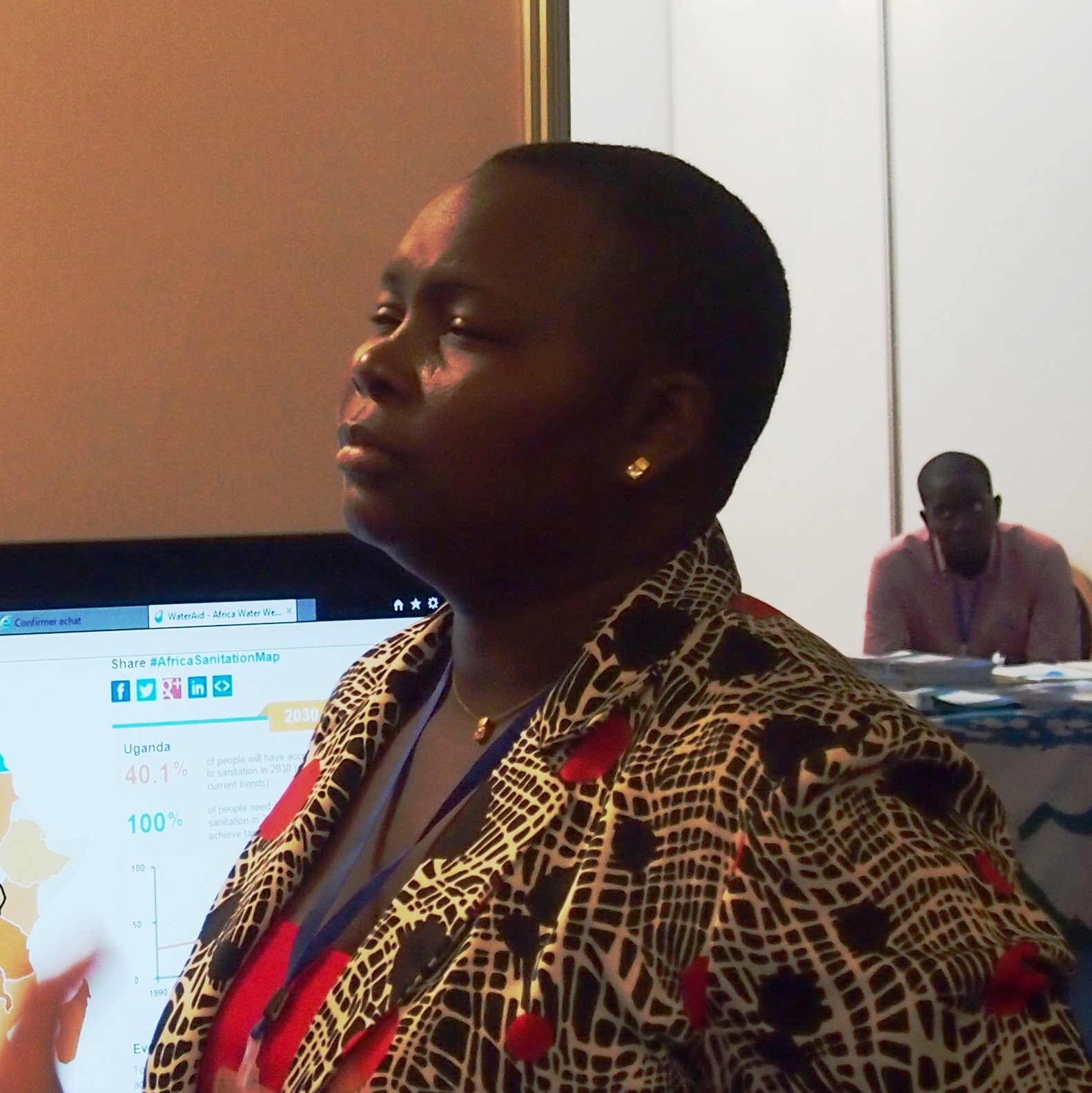
- Born: 26 June 1982 (age 43)
- Education: Makerere University
- Occupation: Politician
- Known for: Ugandan MP who promotes "good governance and development in Africa"
- Political party: National Resistance Movement

Jacqueline Amongin (born 26 June 1982) is a Ugandan MP. She is a member of the National Resistance Movement, who has been awarded a Mandela Leadership Prize for "promoting good governance and development in Africa".

== Life ==
Amongin was born in 1982. She graduated from Makerere University in 2005 as a Bachelor of Environmental Management. She was employed by the Pan African Movement as a communications officer the following year for a year, before becoming a Global Pan African Movement Program Officer until 2010.

In 2011 she joined the Parliament of Uganda and in 2013 she joined the Pan African Parliament. She represents the Ngora District. She was re-elected again in 2016 where she took her seat with four other Ugandan MPs Anifa Kawoya, Professor Ogenga Latigo, Felix Okot Ogong and Veronica Babirye Kadogo.

In 2018 she was chosen from nearly 5,000 candidates to be awarded one of seventeen Mandela Leadership Prizes. The award was made for her work with the Pan African Parliament "promoting good governance and development in Africa". The award was made by the Mandela Institute in Paris. The award noted that she had formed the "Jacqueline Amongin Development Foundation" (JADEF) and her achievement was praised in parliament.
