= Bugiri District =

- District
- District location in Uganda
- Coordinates: 00°33′N 33°45′E
- Country: Uganda
- Region: Eastern Uganda
- Sub-region: Busoga sub-region
- Capital: Bugiri

Area
  - Land: 1,045.9 km^{2} (403.8 sq mi)

Population (2012 Estimate)
  - Total: 426,800
  - Density: 408.1/km^{2} (1,057/sq mi)
- Time zone: UTC+3 (EAT)
- Website: bugiri.go.ug

Bugiri District is a district in Eastern Uganda. Like most other Ugandan districts, it is named after its 'chief town', Bugiri, where the district headquarters are located.

== Location ==
Bugiri District is bordered by Namutumba District and Butaleja District to the north, Tororo District to the northeast, Busia District to the east, Namayingo District to the southeast, Mayuge District to the southwest and Bugweri District to the west. Bugiri, the district headquarters lies 77 kilometres (48 mi), by road, east of Jinja, the largest city in Busoga sub-region. The coordinates of the district are:00 33N, 33 45E (Latitude:0.5500; Longitude:33.7500).

== Overview ==
Bugiri District was carved out of Iganga District, to which it used to belong. The land surface is characterized by gentle undulating hills with few higher residual features. Another feature of the district is its being located in a flat and rolling topographical zone with 90% of its landmass constituting the drainage basins of Lake Victoria and Lake Kyoga. As a result, there are numerous swamps that criss-cross the road network, making the cost of the road improvement costly. In July 2010, the southern part of Bugiri District was split off to form Namayingo District. Bugiri District is part of Busoga sub-region, which is conterminous with Busoga Kingdom, one of the constitutionally recognised kingdoms in Uganda. According to the 2002 national census, the sub-region was home to an estimated 2.5 million people at that time. The districts that constitute Busoga sub-region include the following:

- Bugiri District
- Buyende District
- Iganga District
- Jinja District
- Kaliro District
- Kamuli District
- Luuka District
- Mayuge District
- Namayingo District
- Namutumba District

== Population ==
The national population census conducted in 1991 estimated the district population at about 171,300. The 2002 national census estimated the population of the district at approximately 237,400. The annual population growth rate in the district is calculated at 6.1%. In 2012 the population of Bugiri District was estimated at 426,800.

== Economic activities ==
Agriculture forms the backbone of the district, as it does in the majority of districts in the country. The main crops include:

- Matooke
- Cassava
- Maize
- Millet
- Coffee
- Sorghum
- Peas
- Sweet bananas
- Sweet potatoes
- Lowland Rice

Tilda Uganda Limited (TUL), a commercial agricultural company, grows rice on a commercial basis at Kibimba Rice Scheme, in the extreme east of Bugiri District. Private out growers also sell their produce to TUL.

Due to the abundance of freshwater bodies in the district, commercial fishing is actively practiced by many in Bugiri District. At one time, the district produced in excess of forty (40) metric tonnes of fish on a daily basis. Unfortunately, due to unregulated fishing, the fish reserves in Lake Victoria have been severely disrupted to near-depletion. The daily catch has since markedly fallen from those high numbers. At the height of the fish boom, 75% of the output was exported (mainly to Western Europe), 20% was consumed locally and 5% was lost in processing.

== People ==
- Phillip Wafula Oguttu, was formerly the Member of Parliament (MP) for Bukhooli County Central, a constituency in Bugiri District.
- Frederick Douglas Mwanja Mukisa, was a Ugandan educator and politician. He served as the State Minister for Fisheries in the Ugandan Cabinet, from 1 June 2006 until 27 May 2011. He also served in the elected Ugandan Parliament, representing "Bukooli County Central", Bugiri District

== Livestock kept by the population ==
- Cattle
- Chicken
- Goat

== See also ==
- Bugiri
- Busoga
- Eastern Uganda
- Uganda District
