= Wanyange Girls School =

Location
- Nyange hill, Jinja District; Eastern Region; Uganda; 28°59′31″N 33°14′39″E

Information
- Other name: Wanyange Girls' Secondary School
- Former name: Busoga College Wanyange
- Motto: Kulwa Katonda Ne'Gwanga Lyaffe (For God and Our Country)
- Established: 1 March 1960
- Founder: The Busoga Lukiiko
- Gender: girls
- Houses: River Nile; Owen Falls; L. Kyoga; L. George; L. George; Mt. Masaba
- Colours: Blue, Maroon and Yellow
- Website: wanyangegirls.sc.ug

Wanyange Girls School is a girls' boarding government-aided secondary school on Nyange hill in Jinja District of the Eastern Region, Uganda. It was founded in 1960.

== History ==
When Wanyange Girls School opened on 1 March 1960, it was temporarily located at Buckley High School in Iganga. In 1967, it was provisionally merged with Busoga College Mwiri whilst keeping its own location on Nyange hill, but having the name Busoga College Wanyange. In 1969, it regained its independence. In 2013, the school was temporarily closed because of a students' strike which followed similar strikes in other schools in Jinja District. In 2016, Schoolnet Uganda rated Wanyange Girls School as the tenth best girls' school in Uganda. In 2018, the first RCMRD Uganda Space Challenge was held at Wanyange Girls School after two RCMRD Space Challenges had been held in Kenya in 2017 and 2018.

== Notable staff ==
- Florence Muranga

== Notable alumnae ==
- Queen Sylvia of Buganda, the current Nnabagereka or Queen of Buganda
- Beti Kamya-Turwomwe, businesswoman and politician
- Esther Mbulakubuza Mbayo, politician
- Margaret Lamwaka Odwar, politician
- Professor Jackline Bonabana-Wabbi, Professor of Agribusiness, Makerere University
