= Fred Mukisa =

Ugandan politician and educator (1949–2019)

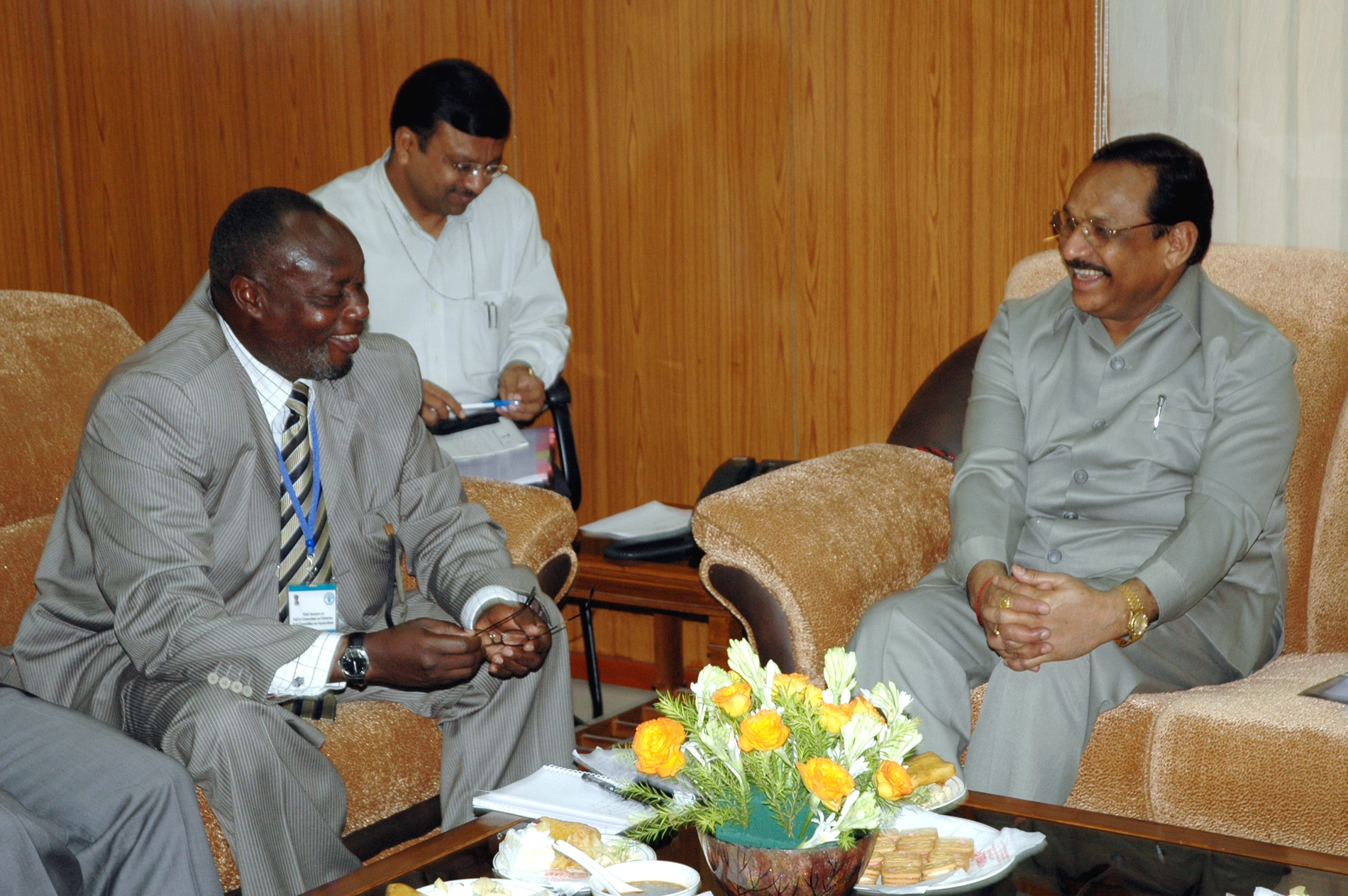
The Minister of State for Fisheries, Republic of Uganda, Mr. Fred Mukisa calls on the Minister of State for Agriculture, Consumers Affairs, Food & Public Distribution, Shri Kantilal Bhuria, in New Delhi on September 07, 2006

Frederick Douglas Mwanja Mukisa (4 April 1949 – 29 December 2019) was a Ugandan educator and politician. He served as the State Minister for Fisheries in the Ugandan Cabinet, from 1 June 2006 until 27 May 2011. In the cabinet reshuffle of 27 May 2011, he was dropped from the cabinet and replaced by Ruth Nankabirwa. He also served in the elected Ugandan Parliament, representing "Bukooli County Central", Bugiri District, from 2006 until 2011. During the 2011 national election cycle, he lost to Hajji Siraji Lyavala during the National Resistance Movement (NRM) primaries, who in turn lost to Wafula Oguttu of the Forum for Democratic Change, in the general election. In March 2015, Siraji Lyavala was elected Chairman (LC-5) of Bugiri District.

== Early life and education ==
Fred Mukisa was born in Bugiri District on 4 April 1949. He held the degree of Bachelor of Arts in Economics, specializing in the Rural Economy, awarded by Makerere University, Uganda's oldest university, founded in 1922. He also held the postgraduate Diploma in Education from the same institution. His degree of Masters in Education Planning & Management, was also obtained from Makerere.

== Career ==
Fred Mukisa started as a teacher in Economics & Accounting, in a high school in Kenya, from 1976 until 1978. He returned to Uganda and worked as a Revenue Accountant, at Kakira Sugar Works, in Jinja, from 1979 until 1981. He then went back to Kenya and worked as the Headmaster at Ekwanda High School, from 1981 until 1985. During that period, from 1976 until 1984, he served as an Examiner for the East African Examination Council (EAEC).

Following the capture of power by the National Resistance Movement in 1986, Fred Mukisa returned to Uganda and worked as a Political Mobilizer, for the NRM in the Busoga sub-region, from 1986 until 1987. In 1987, he was appointed Resident District Commissioner (RDC) for Eastern Uganda, serving in that capacity until 1991. He was then transferred to the NRM Headquarters in Kampala, where he served as the deputy director, of the NRM Secretariat, from 1994 until 1998.

In 1998, he was appointed Minister of State for Fisheries, serving in that capacity until 2001. He also served as a member of the Uganda Land Commission from 2003 until 2006. In 2006, he was re-appointed Minister of State for Fisheries, a position that he had served in between 1998 until 2001. In a space of about six months from November 2010 until May 2011, he lost both his parliamentary seats in a primary election and his cabinet post in a cabinet reshuffle.

== Personal life ==
Fred Mukisa was married. He belonged to the National Resistance Movement political party. His interests included reading, traveling and farming

== See also ==
- Parliament of Uganda
- Cabinet of Uganda
- Bugiri District
