= Esther Mbulakubuza Mbayo =

Ugandan politician (born 1971)

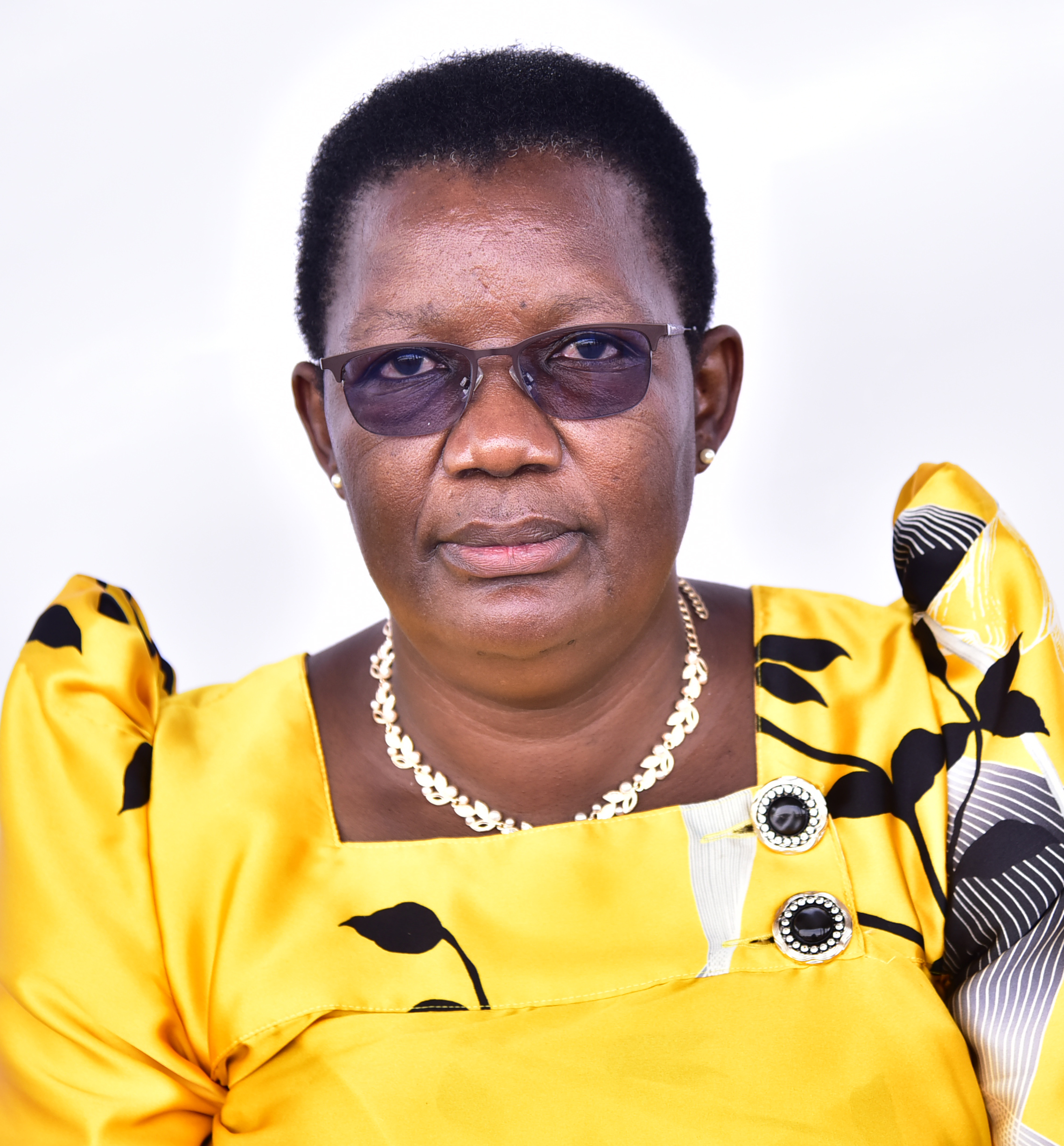
- Mbayo Esther Mbulakubuza
- Born: 27 April 1971 (age 54); Luuka District, Uganda
- Education: Makerere University (Bachelor of Commerce); Institute of Chartered Secretaries and Administrators (Certificate of the ICSA)
- Occupations: Accountant, politician
- Years active: 2001–present
- Title: Cabinet Minister of the Presidency
- Spouse: George Mbayo

Esther Mbulakubuza Mbayo (née Esther Mbulakubuza), is a Ugandan politician. She is the Former Minister of the Presidency in the Ugandan Cabinet. She was appointed to that position on 6 June 2016, replacing Frank Tumwebaze, who was then appointed Ministry of Information Information Technology and Communication.

She serves in the Parliament of Uganda as the Luuka District Women's Representative.

== Early life and education ==
Esther was born on 27 April 1971 in present-day Luuka District in Busoga sub-region, Eastern Region of Uganda. She studied at Wanyange Girls' School for both her O-Level and A-Level education. She attended Makerere University, graduating in 2005, with a Bachelor of Commerce, with specialization in accounting. She also holds a certificate awarded by the Institute of Chartered Secretaries and Administrators.

== Career ==
In 1997, Esther served as an internal auditor for Transocean Uganda Limited. From November 1999 until 2002, she worked as an accounts assistant at Lonrho Motors Uganda Limited, a private automobile dealership in Kampala. From January 2003 until February 2006, she worked as an accountant at Lonrho Motors. She then went to work at Commercial Firms Uganda Limited as an accountant, from April 2006 until August 2007. Concomitantly, from September 2001 until June 2008, she worked as an accountant at Socket Works Uganda Limited. From February 2008 until December 2010, she worked as a financial controller at Cooper Motor Corporation Uganda. She was elected as the Luuka District Woman member of parliament at the 2016 general election, defeating Evelyn Kaabule. She had earlier defeated Kaabule in the NRM primary. On 6 June 2016, she was appointed Cabinet Minister of the Presidency.

In the 2021 Uganda presidential and parliamentary elections, Esther won again.

== Other responsibilities ==
She concurrently serves as the Chairperson of the district Women's League in the ruling National Resistance Movement political party and as Secretary of Busoga Women Leader’s Association.

== Personal life ==
Esther Mbayo is married to George William Mbayo and the couple has three children. In November 2020, she lost her only son Ian Mawanda who died of heart complications after rigorous body work outs at the gym.

== See also ==
- Cabinet of Uganda
- Parliament of Uganda
