= Paul Ssemogerere (politician) =

Ugandan politician (1932–2022)

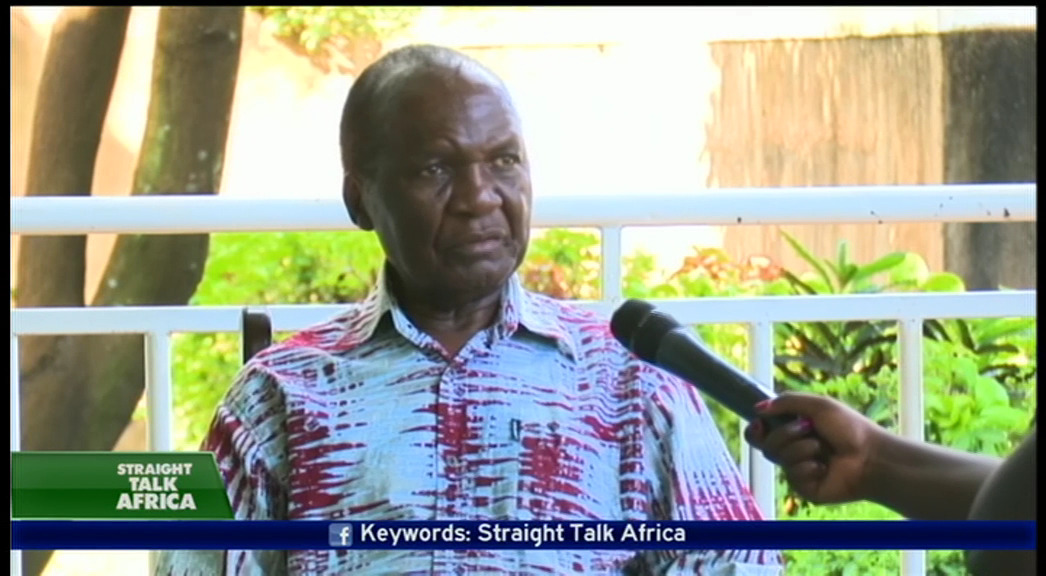
- Paul Kawanga Ssemogerere, former leader of the Democratic Party, talks about Mzee Boniface Byanyima

Leader of the Opposition (Uganda)
- In office December 1980 – July 1985
- President: Milton Obote
- Prime Minister: Otema Allimadi
- Preceded by: Alex Latim
- Succeeded by: Morris Ogenga Latigo

Personal details
- Born: 11 February 1932 British Uganda
- Died: 18 November 2022 (aged 90) Kampala, Uganda
- Party: Democratic Party
- Education: Makerere University (DipEd); Allegheny College (BA); Syracuse University (PhD)
- Occupation: Politician

Paul Kawanga Ssemogerere (11 February 1932 – 18 November 2022) was a Ugandan politician. He was the Leader of the Opposition of Uganda from 1980 to 1985 and the Leader of the Democratic Party for 25 years. He was a key figure in Ugandan politics until his retirement in 2005.

== Early life and education ==
Ssemogerere was born on 11 February 1932, in the Buganda Region (present-day Kalangala District) of Uganda, to Joseph Bagenda Kapeere, a fisherman, and Maria Lwiza Namwendero, a home maker. In 1940, Paul Kawanga Ssemogerere began his formal education at St John's Boys Boarding primary school. He later joined St Henry's College Kitovu's primary section before it was abolished. Paul Kawanga Ssemogerere then joined Kisubi Boys where he completed his Primary Leaving Certificate in1946. After his primary education, he joined St. Mary's College Kisubi in 1946 for his secondary education.

In 1952, he completed the Cambridge Intermediate Examinations (the equivalent to a Higher School Certificate) and he was admitted to Makerere University's faculty of Education for a Diploma in Education, where he joined the Local Student's Union. At Makerere University in Kampala, he graduated with a Diploma in Education (E.A) as a Biology and Chemistry Teacher. While at Makerere University, he participated in the US student exchange programme at Allegheny, Meadville, PA. He studied the Politics and Government Program at Allegheny College in Meadville, Pennsylvania. As a result of Political hunt down in Uganda at the time, he was admitted as a refugee in Baltimore in 1972. While there, he quickly reconnected with his former Professors at Allegheny, Prof. Giles and Prof. Merrick. They hired him part time as a tutor and encouraged him to enroll in school again. In 1974, he earned a master's degree in Public Administration at Syracuse University, New York. In 1979 he obtained a Doctor of Philosophy (PhD) degree in public administration from Syracuse University in Syracuse, New York.

In 1989 he was awarded an Honorary Doctorate of Humane Letters in recognition of his lifelong commitment to human rights and problems, worldwide.

== Political career ==
From 1961 to 1962 Ssemogerere was elected as a member of the Uganda Legislative Council, and afterwards of the National Assembly of Uganda as Member of Parliament for North Mengo Constituency. In 1972, he replaced Benedicto Kiwanuka as the leader of the Democratic Party, having previously served as his Parliamentary Secretary. Following the 1971 coup, Ssemogerere was in exile until 1979, when he returned as Minister of Labour.

In 1980, Paul Ssemogerere assumed leadership of the Democratic Party. In 1984, he was reelected as leader over the challenge of Okeny Atwoma. In response to Okeny Atwoma's unsuccessful challenge, Atwoma established the Nationalist Liberal Party alongside former minister Anthony Ochaya, Cuthbert Joseph Obwangor, and Francis Bwenge.

Ssemogerere was a Presidential Candidate in the disputed 1980 General elections which were won by Milton Obote's Uganda People's Congress. Ssemogerere then became the leader of the parliamentary opposition from 1981 to 1985. He was appointed Minister of Internal Affairs during the presidency of Tito Okello (1985–86).

After Yoweri Museveni became president in January 1986 following a coup, Ssemogerere was consecutively Minister of Internal Affairs (1986–88), Foreign Affairs (1988–94) and Public Service (1994–95) and at the same time held the post of Deputy Prime Minister in Museveni's National Resistance Movement government (from 1986). He resigned from his government posts in June 1995 because he was the presidential candidate for the mainstream opposition, but he lost the 1996 presidential elections to Museveni.

Ssemogerere was also a delegate to the Organisation for African Unity (OAU), and was chairman of the OAU Council of Ministers from 1993 to 1994.

After his retirement from politics in November 2005, he was succeeded as party president by John Ssebaana Kizito, the mayor of Kampala at that time.

== Personal life and death ==
Ssemogerere was married to Germina Namatovu Ssemogerere, a retired professor of economics at Makerere University and Chairperson Wakiso District Service Commission (2016–2025). Their children include Grace Nabatanzi (1963–2011), who married Gerald Ssendaula; Karoli Lwanga Ssemogerere, an American-trained lawyer; now a Judge of the High Court of Uganda, Resident Judge and Head Circuit Kabale; Anna Namakula, a public policy analyst with the Foundation for African Development, Immaculate Kibuuka, a fashion designer; and Paul Semakula (1983–2022) a former ICT Consultant. He was a member of the Roman Catholic religion.

Ssemogerere died on 18 November 2022, at the age of 90 at his home in Rubaga. By the time of his death, Dr. Paul Kawanga Ssemogerere had called for political unity among Uganda's opposition political players.

== Political timeline ==
- 1961–62 Parliamentary Secretary to Chief Minister Benedicto Kiwanuka
- 1963–69 Publicity Secretary Democratic Party
- 1979–81 Member National Consultative Council
- 1981–85 Leader of the Official Opposition
- 1984–94 Vice President Christian Democratic International
- 1985–88 Minister of Internal Affairs
- 1988–90 Chair OAU Council of Ministers
- 1988–94 Second Deputy Prime Minister and Minister of Foreign and Regional Affairs
- 1994–95 Second Deputy Prime Minister and Minister of Public Service
- 1999 Brought the first of 5 landmark cases that outlawed the Movement System and set stage for return of Political Parties to Uganda.
- 2005 Retired as DP President to private business.
- 2011 Honored as Sabasaba 2011 by Sabasaba Flame Award, for being an all time pro-Democracy and peace politician

== See also ==
- Politics of Uganda
