= Wafula Oguttu =

Ugandan politician

- Born: 21 December 1952 (age 73); Butaleja, Uganda
- Citizenship: Uganda
- Education: Beijing Language Institute (Diploma in Chinese Language); Beijing University (Bachelor of Arts in Literature & Political Economy); University of Dar es Salaam (Certificate in Swahili Communication Skills); University of Cardiff (Diploma in Journalism)
- Occupations: Journalist; Politician
- Years active: 1987 — present
- Title: former Leader of Opposition; Parliament of Uganda; MP for Bukooli Central; Bugiri District

Phillip Wafula Oguttu (born 21 December 1952) is a Ugandan journalist and politician. He is a former Leader of Opposition in the Ugandan Parliament. He was appointed to that position on 31 January 2014, replacing Nandala Mafabi, and held it until June 2016 when he handed over the position to Winnie Kiiza.

Oguttu was formerly the Member of Parliament (MP) for Bukhooli County Central, a constituency in Bugiri District, Busoga Sub-region, Eastern Region of Uganda, a role he held from 2011 until 2016. He is a member of Uganda's opposition party Forum for Democratic Change (FDC) for which he was the spokesperson.

Oguttu is also one of the co-founders of the Daily Monitor, a privately owned English-language daily newspaper in Uganda.

== Background ==
Oguttu was born in Buhehe sub-county, Busia District, to Wafula Olago, a veteran of World War II, and Lucia Aguttu. At the time of Oguttu’s birth, his father was working for a borehole-drilling company in Butaleja. A Samia by tribe, Wafula was raised in Mbajja Village, Lumino Sub-county, in present-day Busia District. The administrative area at that time was known as Bukedi District and included present-day Busia District, Tororo District, Pallisa District, Butaleja District, and Kibuku District. His name "Oguttu" in the Samia culture is given to someone born on the veranda or in the garden behind a house.

Wafula grew up with five sisters and three brothers. His father died in 1960 when he was a primary two pupil. Because he was a bright student, he studied for free from primary to university despite being from a poverty-stricken family. He moved to present day Bugiri in Busoga in 1980 and fully transformed himself into a naturalized Musoga.

== Education ==
Oguttu attended Lumino Mill Hill Primary School, Bukedi College Kachonga, and Teso College Aloet for his primary and secondary education. In 1974, he received a Diploma in Chinese Language from the Beijing Language Institute. He also holds a Bachelor of Arts in Literature and Political Economy degree from Beijing University. He holds a Certificate in Swahili Communication Skills, obtained in 1978 from the University of Dar es Salaam. He also holds a postgraduate Diploma in Journalism from the University of Cardiff.

== Career ==
Oguttu started his working career in 1973 as a banking assistant at the Bank of Uganda. He was an editor for a Tanzania publishing house from 1977 until 1979. He went on to work as an assistant editor and then chief editor for Weekly Topic, an English language newspaper, from 1979 until 1992. He also served as an assistant lecturer at Makerere University between 1981 and 1985. He and others founded the Daily Monitor newspaper in 1992, eventually becoming the editor-in-chief before leaving in 2004. He is the executive chairman of Santa Lucia Basic School.

Oguttu started his political career as a media politician in the 1970s when he was an assistant editor for Weekly Topic. He continued to be very active in media politics in the 1980s when he was then the editor in chief of the aforesaid newspaper. In the late 1980s, he held his first political office as an LCI Councillor for Nakawa Division. Government tried to have influence on his political columns in the early 1990s, but this prompted his resignation from Weekly Topic in 1992. He then founded the Daily Monitor that same year, as an anti-government newspaper at the time. He ran the Daily Monitor as the chief editor until his retirement in 2004. It was about that time that he co-founded the Forum for Democratic Change (FDC) with Kiiza Besigye and others.

He ran for his first parliamentary elections in 2006 on the FDC ticket, standing in the constituency of Bukhooli Country Central but ultimately losing to Fred Mukisa. In the 2011 general election he stood for the same seat, defeating NRM flagbearer Hajji Siraji Lyavala (who had defeated Mukisa in the NRM primary). He was unable to hold the seat in the 2016 general election however, losing out to the NRM's Solomon Silwany.

On 31 January 2014, he was appointed Leader of Opposition in parliament. He also sat on the following parliamentary committees:

- Appointments Committee
- Business Committee
- Committee on Information and Communication Technology

== Personal life ==
Oguttu is currently married to Alice Oguttu with five sons and two daughters. He however had a second wife, Freda, who died in July 2012 with whom he fathered two sons. He is of the Roman Catholic faith.

Oguttu has supported farmers in Bugiri District on numerous occasions. At one time, he donated 30,000 coffee seedlings to farmers in his constituency to enhance household income, but put a condition that it was only "people with toilets" to benefit.

== See also ==
- Parliament of Uganda
- List of political parties in Uganda
- Busia District
- Butaleja District
- Bugiri District

Political offices
Preceded by Nathan Nandala Mafabi	Leader of Opposition in Parliament (LOP); 2014–2016	Succeeded by Winnie Kiiza
