= Evelyn Kaabule =

Ugandan accountant & politician (born 1966)

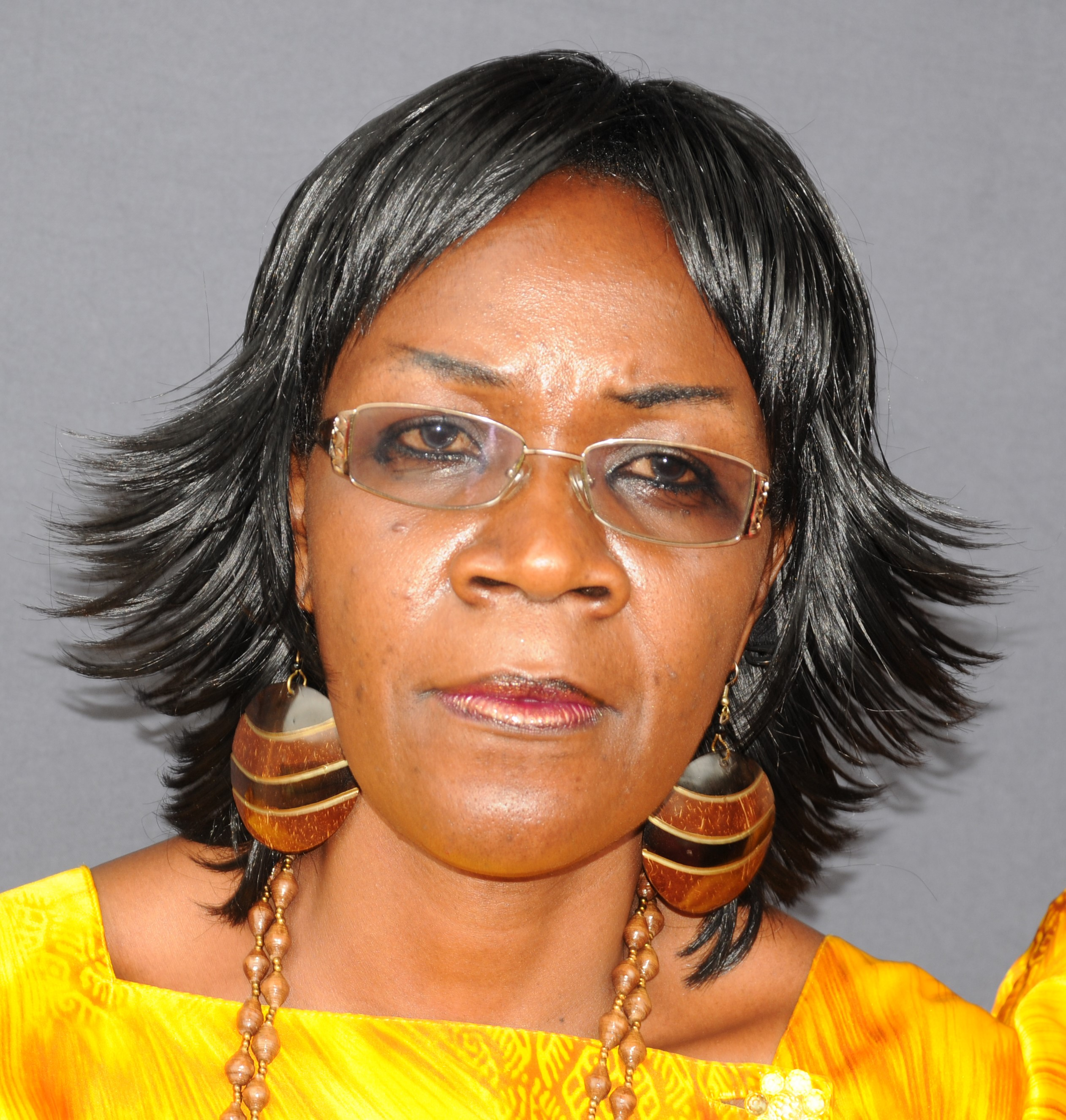
- Woman Representative - Luuka District
- Born: 1 July 1966 (age 60); Luuka, Uganda
- Education: Makerere University (Bachelor of Arts); College of Professional Management, UK (Diploma in Business Administration); Uganda Management Institute (Masters of Science), (Diploma in Human Resources Management)
- Occupations: Human Resource Management Consultant and Politician
- Years active: 1988 – present
- Known for: Human Resource Management Consultant and Politician
- Title: Honorable Member of Parliament

Kaabule Evelyn Naome Mpagi (born 1 July 1966) is a Ugandan human resource management consultant and politician. She is a former Member of Parliament, having served as the first Women's Representative for Luuka District in Uganda's 9th Parliament, after the district was created by an act of parliament and became functional on 1 July 2010. She served in this role until 2016 when she was defeated by Esther Mbulakubuza Mbayo in the 2016 general election. Then a member of the National Resistance Movement (NRM), she served on three parliamentary committees during her time in Parliament: the Public Accounts Committee, the Committee on Social Services, and the Presidential Affairs Committee. Having been defeated by Mbayo in the NRM primary, she ran on an independent ticket in the 2016 election cycle.

== Background ==
Kaabule was born in Luuka District. A musoga by tribe, she was born in an Anglican family. She converted to a Born Again Christian while at Makerere University.

== Education ==
Kaabule attended Trinity College Nabbingo for her middle and high school education. She graduated from Makerere University in 1988 with a Bachelor of Arts in Social Sciences. In 1998, she obtained her Diploma in Business Administration from the College of Professional Management UK. Her Diploma in Human Resource Management was obtained in 2003 from the Uganda Management Institute (UMI). In 2010, she graduated from UMI with a Master of Science in Human Resource Management.

== Current ==
As of 2019, Evelyn Kaabule is serving as the Vice President of African Parliamentarians' Network on Development Evaluation (APNODE).

== Awards and recognition ==
In 2016, Evelyn Kaabule was listed as one of the Members of Parliament that was to be awarded a Golden Jubilee Medal
