= Margaret Lamwaka Odwar =

Ugandan politician (born 1969)

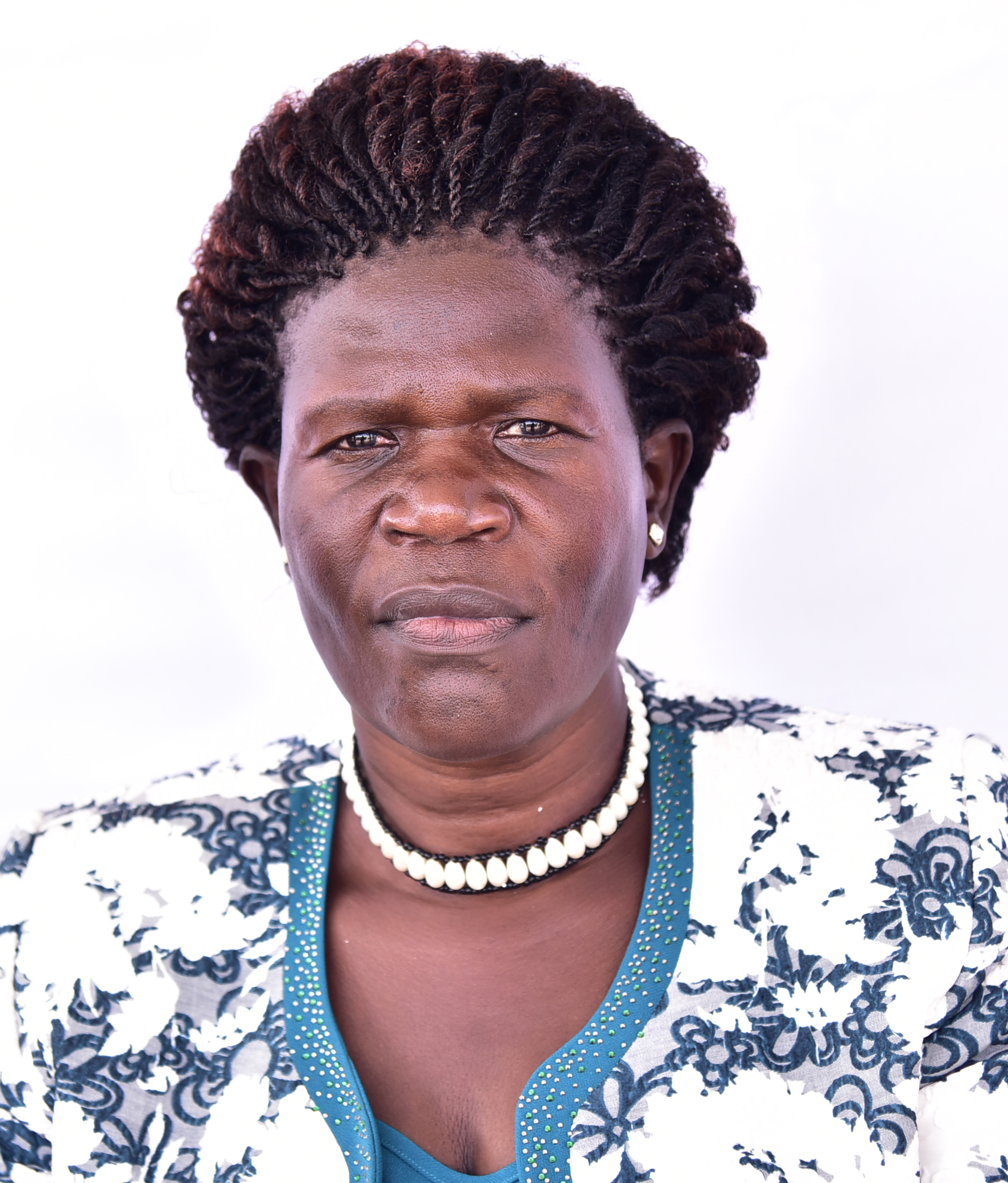
- Born: 23 December 1969 (age 56); Kitgum District, Uganda
- Education: Alero Primary Teachers College (Grade III Teachers Certificate); National Teachers College, Unyama (Diploma in Primary Education); Uganda Christian University (Bachelor of Education) (Master of Education Planning and Administration)
- Occupations: Teacher and politician
- Years active: 1989 to present
- Known for: Politics
- Title: Member of Parliament for Kitgum District

Margaret Lamwaka Odwar (née Margaret Lamwaka), also Margaret Odwar, (born 23 December 1969), is a Ugandan politician who served as Member of Parliament representing the Kitgum District Women's Constituency in the 10th Ugandan Parliament (2016 to 2021). She is the incumbent Member of parliament representing chua East county, Kitgum district in the 11th Parliament of Uganda (2021 - 2026).

In the 2026 elections, she contested for the Kitgum District Woman MP seat as an independent candidate and lost to Lilian Aber.

== Early life and education ==
Margaret Odwar was born in Kitgum District, in the Acholi sub-region, in the Northern Region of Uganda, on 23 December 1969. She obtained her Primary Leaving Certificate from Koch Goma Central Primary School. In 1986, she obtained her O-Level certificate from Wanyange Girls' Secondary School, in Jinja District.

She went on to obtain a Grade III Teachers Certificate, from Alero Primary Teachers College and a Diploma in Primary Education, from National Teachers College, Unyama.

In 2006, she was awarded a Bachelor of Education degree, followed three years later by a Master of Education Planning and Administration degree, both from Uganda Christian University, in Mukono.

== Career ==
=== Before politics ===
From 1989 until 2015, Margaret Lamwaka taught in primary schools in various parts of Uganda. Se started out as a Grade III Teacher at Gulu Public Primary School, in 1989, rising to Grade I Head Teacher at Pandwong Primary School, in 2015.

=== Political career ===
In 2016, Margaret Lamwaka contested for the Kitgum District Woman Member of Parliament, on the ruling National Resistance Movement political party ticket. She won and is the incumbent MP for Kitgum District Women.

In the 10th parliament, she is a member of two parliamentary committees; (a) the committee on rules, privileges and discipline and (b) the committee on education and sports.

In 2021 general elections, she contested as an independent candidate for member of parliament representing chua east county, Kitgum district and she won with 9,195 votes.

== See also ==
- Beatrice Atim Anywar
- Okello Oryem
