= Tropical Bank =

Commercial bank in Uganda

- Company type: Private
- Industry: Financial services
- Founded: 1973; 53 years ago
- Headquarters: Kampala, Uganda
- Key people: Ibrahim Senyonga Atwoki board chairman Khalifa Achour Ettalua deputy board chairman, Abdulaziz M. Mansur managing director & executive director
- Products: Loans, checking, savings, debit cards, investments, mortgages
- Revenue: ▲ Aftertax: UGX:7.4 billion (2022)
- Total assets: UGX:281 billion (2022)
- Website: www.trobank.com

Tropical Bank is a commercial bank in Uganda. It is licensed and supervised by the Bank of Uganda, the country's central bank and national banking regulator.

== Overview ==
As of December 2019, Tropical Bank was a small financial services provider in Uganda. The bank's assets at that time were UGX:316 billion (approximately US$84 million).

== History ==
The bank was established in 1973 as the Arab Libyan Bank for Foreign Trade & Development. In 1994, the name was changed to Tropical Africa Bank Limited. In 2006, the bank re-branded to Tropical Bank.

== Ownership ==
99.91 percent of the share capital of Tropical Bank is owned by the Libyan government through the Libyan Foreign Bank. The remaining 0.09 percent is owned by the government of Uganda through the Ministry of Finance & Economic Development.

== Governance ==
Tropical Bank is governed by an eight-person board of directors, of whom two are executive directors and six are non-executive. Ibrahim Senyonga Atwoki the non-executive director, is the board chairman. Khalifa Achour Ettalua, the non-executive director, is the deputy board chairman. Abdulaziz M.A. Mansur is the managing director and Joweria Mukalazi is the acting executive director. Four other directors assist him in running the bank.

== Branch network ==
As of November 2020, Tropical Bank had a network of branches in the Central, Western and Eastern regions of Uganda.

1. Kampala Road Branch - 27 Kampala Road, Kampala (Main Branch) and Head Office
2. Ntinda Branch - 1 Kimera Road, Ntinda, Kampala
3. Jinja Branch - 17 Main Street, Jinja
4. Masaka Branch - 2 Birch Avenue, Masaka
5. Mukono branch - Mukono, Uganda Mukono
6. Kawempe Branch - 3144 Kampala-Gulu Road, Kawempe, Kampala
7. Oasis Mall Branch - Yusuf Lule Road, Kampala
8. Kakira Branch - Downtown Area, Kakira

== See also ==
- List of banks in Uganda
- Banking in Uganda
