= Morris Ogenga Latigo =

Ugandan academic and politician

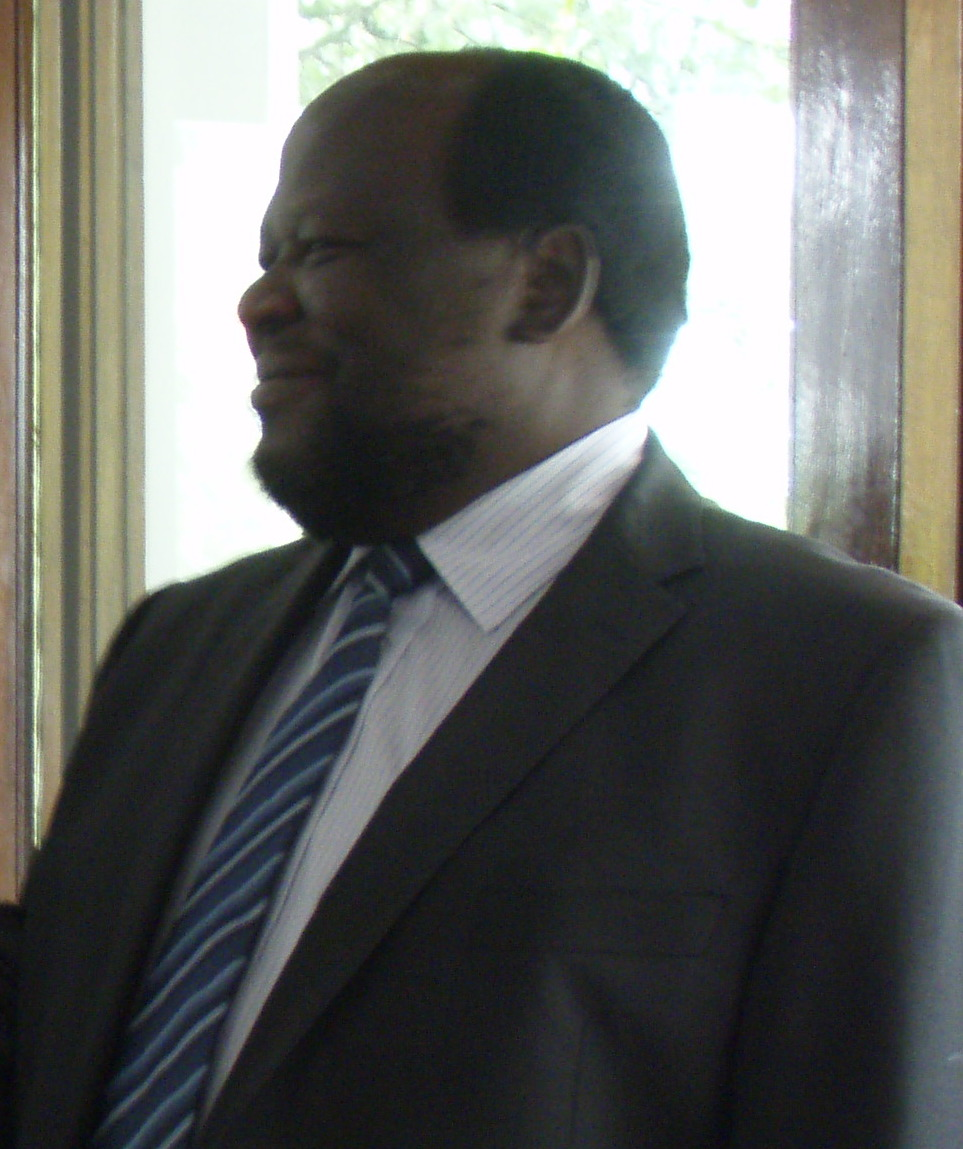
- Latigo in 2010

Leader of the Opposition (Uganda)

Professor
- In office 2006–2010
- President: Yoweri Museveni
- Prime Minister: Apolo Nsibambi
- Preceded by: Paul Ssemogerere
- Succeeded by: Nandala Mafabi

Personal details
- Born: 1952 (age 73–74)
- Party: Independent (since 2020); Forum for Democratic Change (until 2020)

Morris Ogenga Latigo (born 1952) is a Ugandan professor of agriculture, academic and politician of the Forum for Democratic Change (FDC) who was the Leader of Opposition in the Parliament of Uganda from 2006 to 2010.

Latigo hails from Northern Uganda. He was elected to parliament representing the Agago North constituency on the ticket of the Forum for Democratic Change. From 2006 to 2010, he served as the leader of the opposition in parliament. He left the FDC in 2020 after failing to secure the party's ticket to run for re-election in the Agago North constituency seat in parliament, describing the FDC and all other political parties in Uganda as “stinking”. He then declared that he would run for the Agago North parliamentary seat as an independent candidate.

Latigo has been involved in a number of automobile accidents. In October 2009 and in January 2011, Latigo survived fatal accidents along the Kampala-Gulu highway. On January 30, 2018, his vehicle rammed into a parked truck in Kakooge, Luwero district along Kampala highway. In January 2019, Latigo was involved in an auto crash while travelling to his home town in Northern Uganda when his vehicle collided with an on-coming bus but survived the crash.

Ogenga Latigo has been a regular attendee and speaker at the annual Ugandan North American Association (UNAA) convention in the USA.
