= Bangirana Kawooya Anifa =

Ugandan politician

- Born: 21 January 1957 (age 69); Sembabule District
- Education: Nkumba University (Bachelor's degree of Arts and Development Studies) (Masters’ degree of international relations)
- Occupation: politician
- Known for: politics

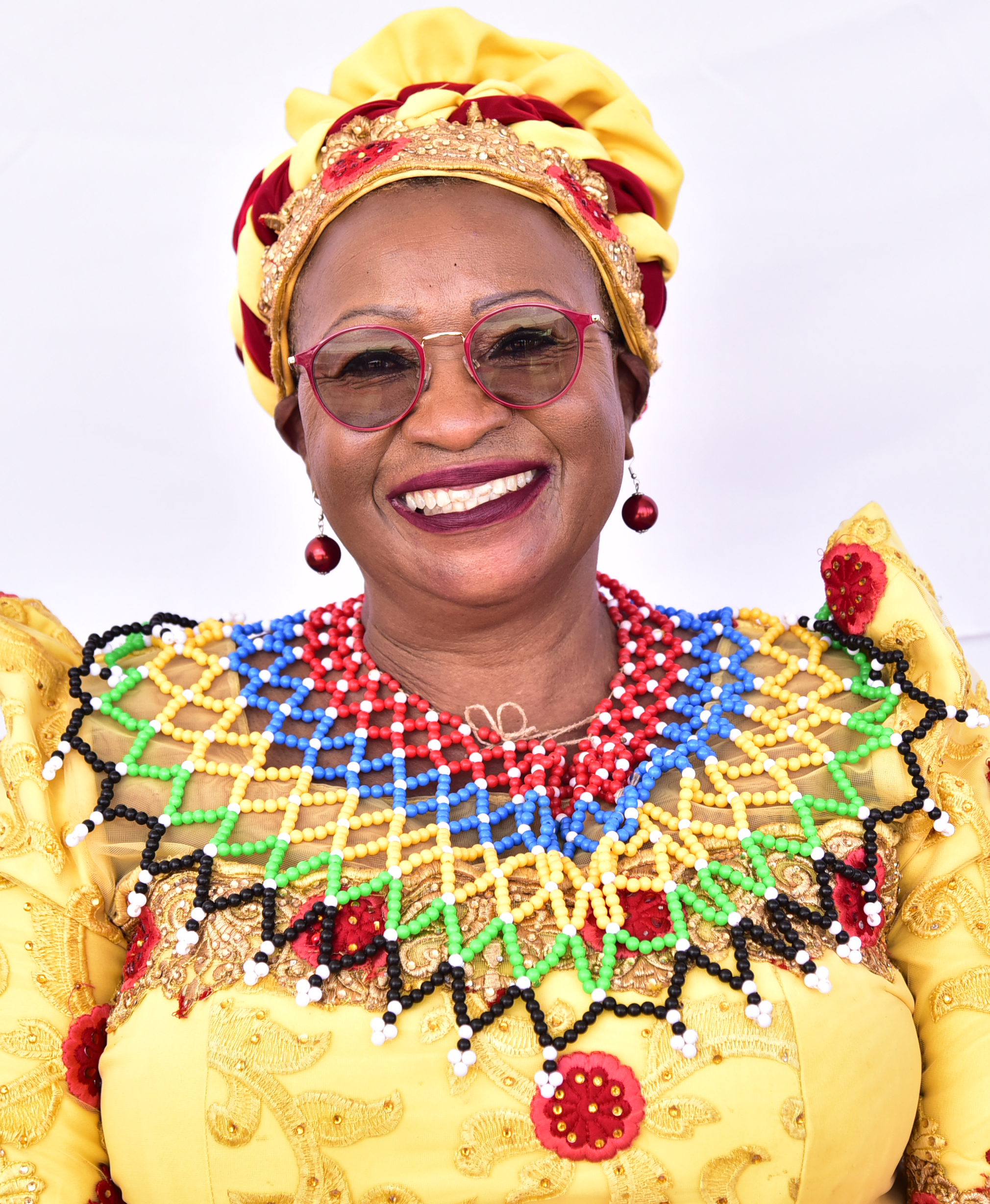

Bangirana Kawooya Anifa (born 21 January 1957), is a Ugandan politician who serves as Minister of State for Health in charge of General Duties. She served as a Women Representative from 2000 to 2020 Member of Parliament and is now representing Mawogola West Constituency Sembabule district in the Ugandan Parliament (2021 - 2026). She concurrently served as a member on the Equal opportunities and Foreign affairs committees.

== Early life and education ==
Anifa was born on 21 January 1957 in Sembabule district in Uganda.

She earned her bachelor's degree of Arts and Development Studies that was awarded by Nkumba university in 2004. Later in 2001, she was awarded a master's degree of international relations by the same university in 2007.

== Career and politics ==
Before she became a member of the parliament of Uganda in 2001, Anifa worked as a Constituent Assembly Delegate(1993–1995), she served as the Executive Publicity Secretary for the National Women Council (1998–2002) as well served as a deputy resident district commissioner in Rakai district and as a speaker for Sembabule District local government as a caucus treasurer for the National Resistance Movement.

In 2016 she became a member of the Pan-African Parliament up-to-date.

She subscribes to the ruling National Resistance Movement political party.

She was appointed as the state minister of health for general duties in the cabinet of Uganda for the 2026–2031 term. She also serves as the elected Member of Parliament for Mawogola West Constituency in Sembabule District. Kawooya retained both her parliamentary seat and ministerial position after the 2026 general elections and was sworn in as a member of the 12th Parliament in May 2026.
