= Felix Ogong =

Ugandan politician

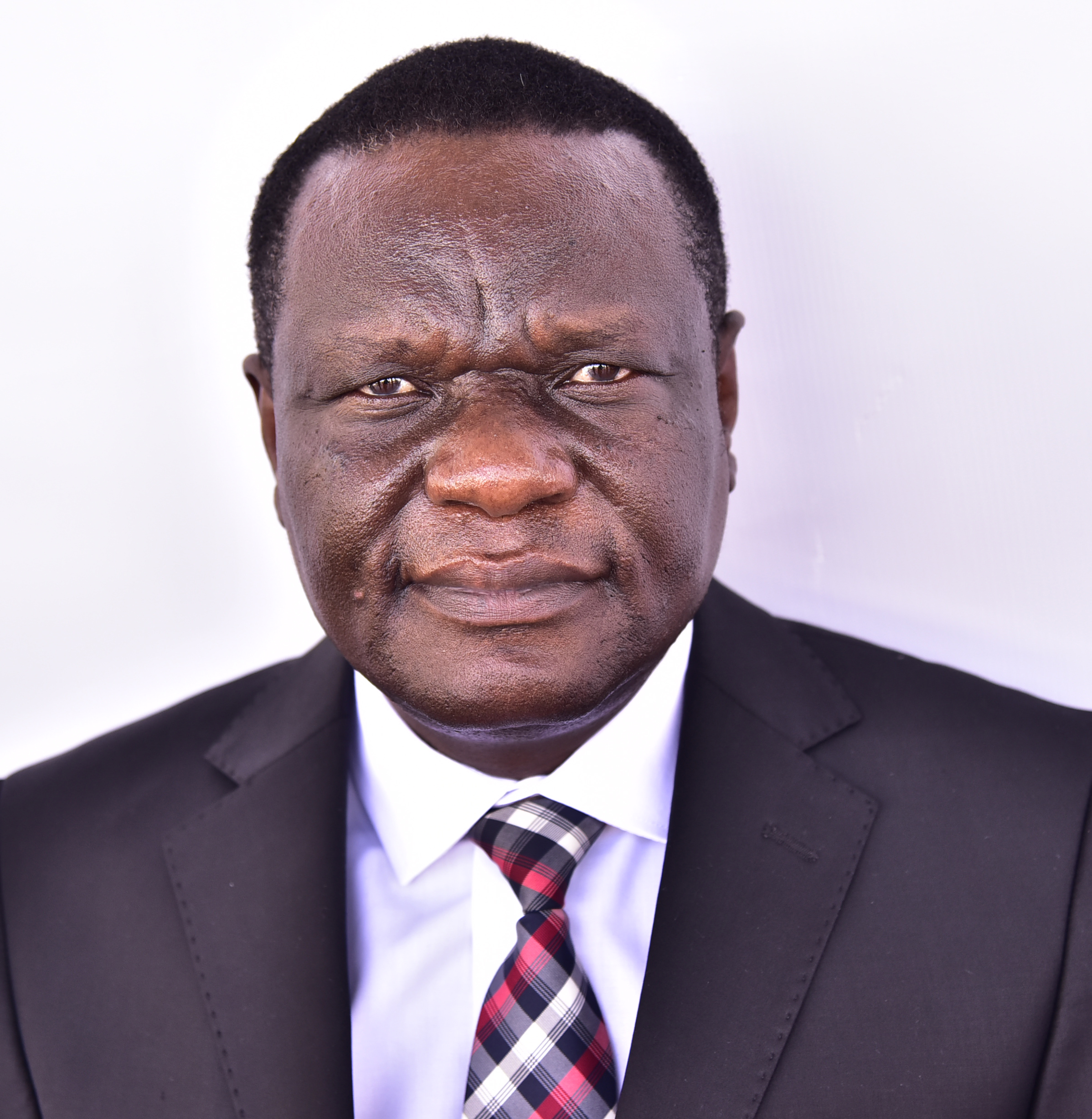

Member of the Parliament of Uganda from Dokolo South County
- Incumbent
- Assumed office 1996
- Constituency: Dokolo South County

Member of Pan-African Parliament from Uganda
- Incumbent
- Assumed office 2016

State Minister for Youth and Children Affairs

Personal details
- Born: January 22, 1965 (age 61)
- Party: National Resistance Movement (NRM)
- Education: Makerere University
- Profession: Economist

Felix Okot Ogong (born 22 January 1965) is a Ugandan economist, politician and member of parliament from Dokolo South County currently sitting in the Pan African Parliament, the legislative arm of African Union for a second term having been sent to the parliament during the 10th Ugandan Parliament. He was a State Minister for Youth and Children Affairs and he is a member of National Resistance Movement (NRM) on whose platform he served in the parliament since 1996. Ogong is the founder and Managing Director of Feslistar bus services and Voice of Lango Fm based in Lira town.

== Early life and education ==
Ogong is a Christian and a member of Anglican denomination. He earned a bachelor’s degree in Economics and Geography from Makerere University.
