= 1996 Ugandan presidential election =

- 9 May 1996
- Registered: 8,492,154
- Turnout: 72.58%
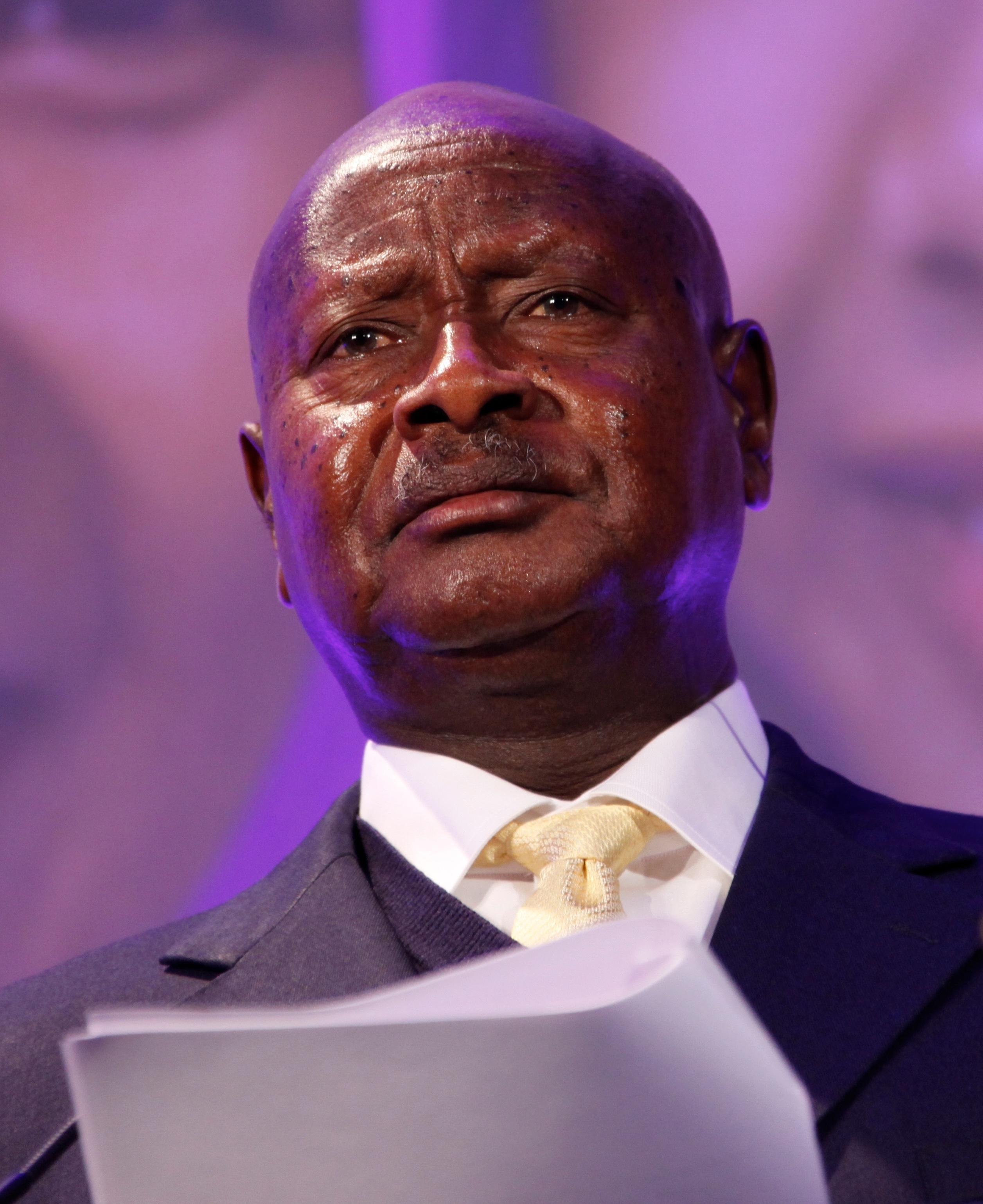

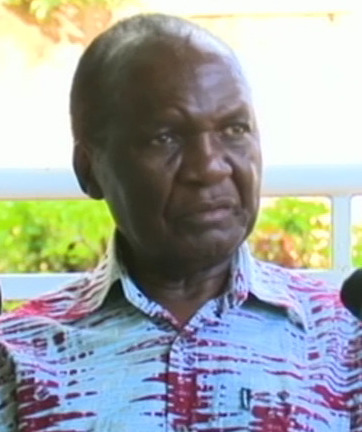
| Candidate | Yoweri Museveni | Paul Ssemogerere |
| Party | Independent | Independent |
| Popular vote | 4,428,119 | 1,416,139 |
| Percentage | 74.20% | 23.73% |
- Results by district Museveni: 50–60% 60–70% 70–80% 80–90% >90% Ssemogerere: 50–60% 70–80% 80–90% >90%
President before election
Yoweri Museveni
Independent
Elected President
Yoweri Museveni
Independent

Presidential elections were held in Uganda on 9 May 1996. They were the first direct presidential elections in Uganda's history, following the adoption of the 1995 constitution. Presidential elections were held in Uganda for the first time on 9 May 1996. The result was a victory for incumbent Yoweri Museveni, who received 74% of the vote. All candidates ran as independents, as political parties were banned at the time. President Yoweri Museveni Paul Ssemogerere Kibirige MayanjaVoter turnout was 73%.

== Conduct ==
Domestic observer Steven Owor noted "fundamental flaws" in the electoral process, though NRM officials contested his critique. The opposition’s inability to access courts, coupled with NRM's state resource advantage, fueled perceptions of bias, despite no evidence of widespread fraud.

== Results ==
The Electoral Commission announced Museveni's victory with 74% of the vote, followed by Ssemogerere with 24% and Mayanja with 2%. Of 6,193,816 votes cast, 196,190 were invalid.

| Candidate | Party | Votes | % |
|---|---|---|---|
| Yoweri Museveni | Independent | 4,428,119 | 74.20 |
| Paul Ssemogerere | Independent | 1,416,139 | 23.73 |
| Kibirige Mayanja | Independent | 123,290 | 2.07 |
| Total | | 5,967,548 | 100.00 |
| Valid votes | | 5,967,548 | 96.82 |
| Invalid/blank votes | | 196,130 | 3.18 |
| Total votes | | 6,163,678 | 100.00 |
| Registered voters/turnout | | 8,492,231 | 72.58 |
Source: Electoral Commission
