= Betty Aol Ochan =

Ugandan politician

Betty Aol Ocan
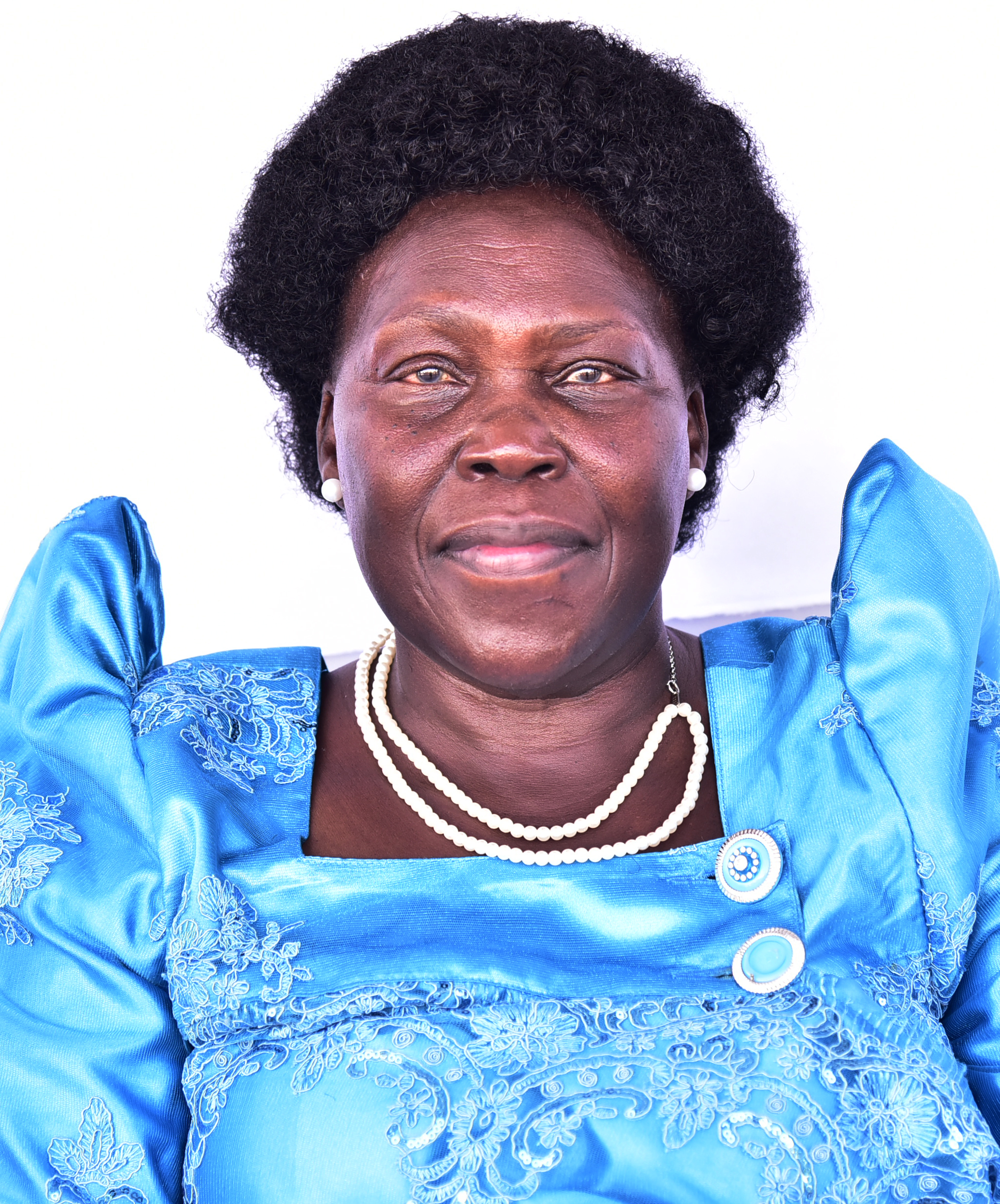
- Born: 28 November 1958 (age 67); Uganda
- Citizenship: Uganda
- Education: Makerere University (Diploma in Education); Gulu University (Bachelor of Development Studies); Uganda Martyrs University (Master of Development Studies)
- Occupations: Teacher, politician
- Years active: 1981–present
- Known for: Politics
- Title: Parliamentary Leader of Opposition (Uganda)

Betty Aol Ochan (born 28 November 1958) is a Ugandan teacher and politician, who was appointed Leader of Opposition in Uganda's Parliament on 3 August 2018 by Patrick Amuriat, the president of Forum for Democratic Change (FDC), the largest opposition party in the 10th Parliament (2016–2021).

She was a member of parliament representing Gulu district in Uganda's 10th Parliament.

She served as the Gulu City Woman Representative in the 11th parliament of Uganda under the Forum for Democratic Change (FDC)

She was sworn in on 13 May 2026 as Gulu City Woman MP, formally joining the 12th Parliament under the People's Front for Freedom (PFF) after moving from FDC.

== Early life and education ==
Ochan was born on 28 November 1958. She attended Makerere University, Uganda's largest and oldest public university, graduating with a Diploma in Education in 1981. In 2006, she was awarded a Bachelor of Development Studies degree by Gulu University. Her Master of Development Studies degree was obtained from Uganda Martyrs University. She also holds a number of certificates in rural development, leadership and social work, from local and international institutions.

== Career ==
Prior to joining politics, Ochan was a secondary school teacher from 1981 to 1990. Half of that time, until 1985, was spent at Layibi College, while the remainder of her teaching career was spent at Awere Secondary School.

In 1990, she took up employment with the Kenya-based non-profit organization ACORD, based at its offices in Gulu, as a Rural Development Worker, serving in that capacity until 1995. She then worked as a program officer at St. Muritz Catholic Parish for two years until 1997.

For the next nine years, until 2006, Ochan was a member of Gulu District Council. In 2006, she was elected to the Ugandan Parliament on the FDC political party ticket. She has been a member of parliament ever since.
