= Winnie Kiiza =

Ugandan teacher and politician

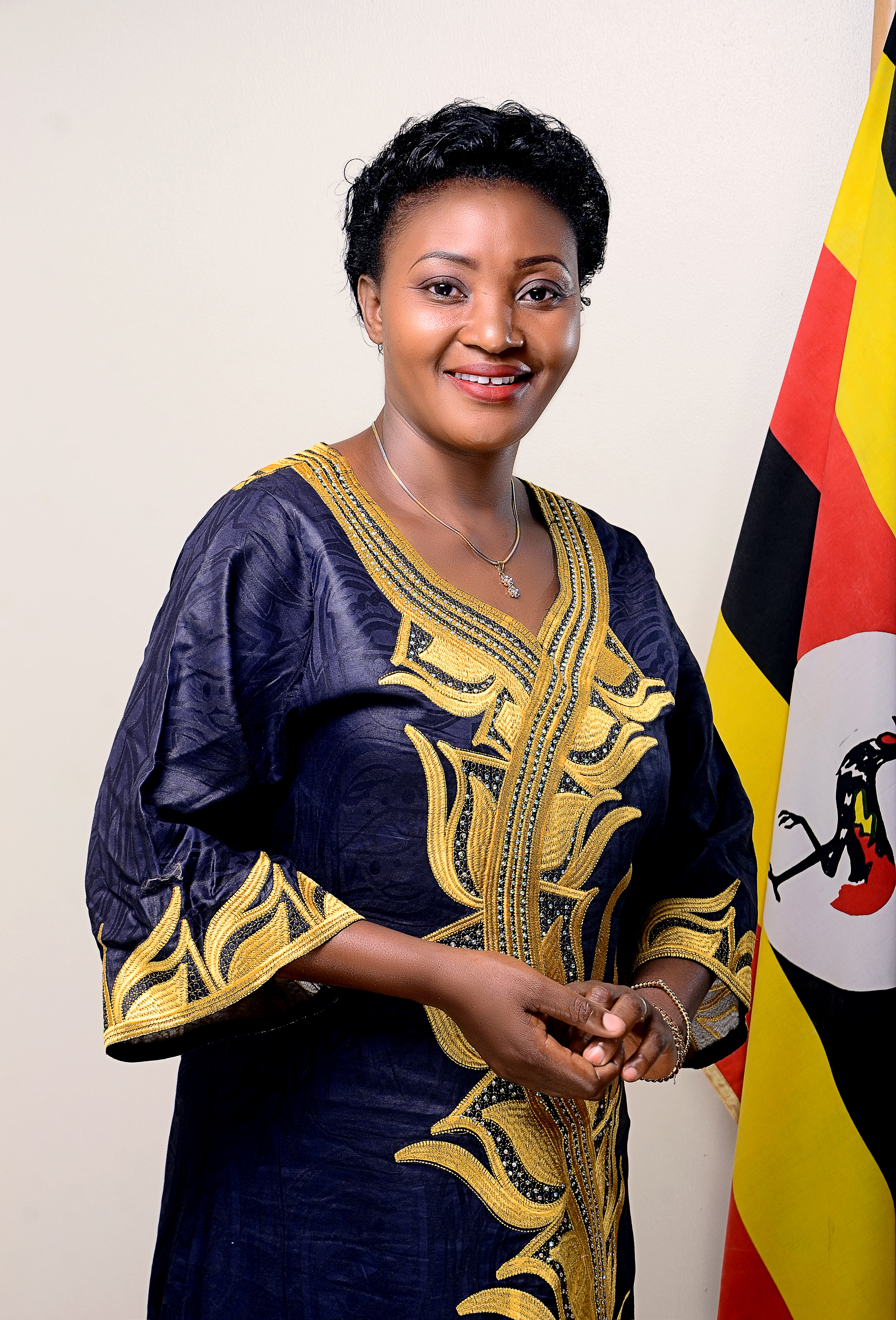
- Born: 26 November 1972 (age 53); Kasese
- Citizenship: Uganda
- Occupations: Teacher, politician
- Years active: 2006–present
- Known for: Politics
- Title: Member of Parliament for Kasese District Women Constituency
- Spouse: Yokasi Bihande Bwambale
- Website: www.winniekiiza.com

Winifred Kiiza (born 26 November 1972) is a Ugandan teacher and politician, who served as the Leader of Opposition in the Ugandan Parliament, from May 2016 until August 2018. She was replaced as Leader of Opposition by Betty Aol Ochan.

She was also the Member of Parliament representing the Kasese District Women in the 10th Ugandan Parliament (2016 to 2021).

== Early life and education ==
Winifred Kiiza was born on 26 November 1972 in Nsenyi Village, Kisinga sub-county, Kasese District, in the Western Region of Uganda. Her mother, Modesty Muke, was a supporter of the Uganda Peoples Congress (UPC) political party, while her father, Kanyere Constance Muke, belonged to the Democratic Party (DP). Kiiza's father died when she was ten years old, leaving her care and that of her siblings in the hands of a single unemployed mother.

She attended Nsenyi Primary School, Kajwenge Primary School and Kisinga Primary School for her elementary education. For her O-Level studies, she attended Saadi Memorial Secondary School, transferring to Saint Maria Goretti School in Fort Portal for her final two years of high school.

Later she attended National College of Business Studies (NCBS), in Nakawa, Kampala, at the time it transformed into Makerere University Business School (MUBS).

== Career ==
=== Beginnings ===
Kiiza started teaching at her alma mater, Kisinga Primary School, during the vacation following her Senior 4 examinations. She did the same at Saint Maria Goretti School, teaching there after her A-Level examinations. Around the time Bwera General Hospital was constructed, she worked for one of the contractors, in their stores department. Later she worked for a tour guide company in nearby Queen Elizabeth National Park.

=== Political career ===
Kiiza's entry into full-time politics occurred in the 1996 to 2001 political season, during which she served on the Kasese District Local Council as the District Secretary for Finance. In 2001, she was re-elected to the district council, serving as Secretary for Education and later Secretary for Social Services. She contested the Kasese District Women's parliamentary seat in 2006, on the opposition Forum for Democratic Change (FDC) political party ticket. She won and was elected in 2011 and in 2016. In May 2016, Kiiza, at age 44, was appointed Leader of Opposition in the parliament of Uganda, making her the first woman to assume that position in the history of the country.

On 16 July 2020, she announced that she would not seek to become a member of the Ugandan parliament again, ending her 15 year reign as the Kasese District Woman MP, even though she was still popular.

== Personal life ==
Kiiza is married and a mother.

== See also ==
- Kasese Clashes
