= List of members of the tenth Parliament of Uganda =

Tenth Parliament of Uganda
←	9th Parliament	11th Parliament	→
- Members of the Parliament of Uganda

Overview
- Legislative body: Parliament of Uganda
- Jurisdiction: Uganda
- Meeting place: Parliament of Uganda, Kampala, Uganda
- Term: 17 May 2016 – 24 May 2021
- Election: 2016 Ugandan general election
- Government: Yoweri Museveni Government
- Website: www.parliament.go.ug

Parliament of Uganda
- Members: 426
- Speaker: Rebecca Kadaga
- Deputy Speaker: Jacob Oulanyah
- Leader of the Opposition: Betty Aol Ochan
- Party control: National Resistance Movement

This is a list of members elected to the tenth Parliament of Uganda (2016 to 2021) in the 2016 general election. It was preceded by the ninth Parliament (2011 to 2016) and succeeded by the eleventh Parliament (starting 2021).

== Leadership ==
The acting Chief Justice of the Supreme Court of Uganda Steven Kavuma presided over the election of the Speaker of the Tenth Parliament of Uganda, which Rebecca Alitwala Kadaga won, making her the tenth Speaker of the Tenth Parliament of Uganda. She then oversaw the election of the Deputy Speaker of the 10th Parliament of Uganda. Muhammad Nsereko and Jacob Oulanya both ran, and Oulanya won 300 votes to 115 votes, with President Yoweri Museveni in attendance.

== Composition ==
Party	Constituency			Women			Seats		
Party	Votes	%	Seats	Votes	%	Seats	Appointed	Total	+/–
National Resistance Movement	3,945,000	48.88	199	3,566,617	48.95	84	10	293	+30
Forum for Democratic Change	1,027,648	12.73	29	929,860	12.76	7	0	36	+2
Democratic Party	349,962	4.34	13	246,284	3.38	2	0	15	+3
Uganda People's Congress	172,781	2.14	4	236,164	3.24	2	0	6	–4
Justice Forum	20,089	0.25	0	16,741	0.23	0	0	0	–1
Ugandan Federal Alliance	18,146	0.22	0				0	0	New
Conservative Party	10,792	0.13	0	2,902	0.04	0	0	0	–1
Social Democratic Party	5,972	0.07	0				0	0	New
Republican Women and Youth Party	2,311	0.03	0	8,502	0.12	0	0	0	New
People's Progressive Party	2,185	0.03	0	16,720	0.23	0	0	0	New
Uganda Patriotic Movement	470	0.01	0				0	0	New
Activist Party	175	0.00	0				0	0	New
Independents	2,515,163	31.16	44	2,261,897	31.05	17	5	66	+23
Uganda People's Defence Force							10	10	0
Total	8,070,694	100.00	289	7,285,687	100.00	112	25	426	+51
Registered voters/turnout	15,277,198	–		15,277,198	–				
Source: EC, Election Passport

== List of members ==
Name	Party	Constituency	District
Michael Ayep	NRM	Labwor County	Abim District
Janet Grace Akech Okorimoe	NRM	Women's Representative	Abim District
Mark Dulu Angel	NRM	Adjumani East County	Adjumani District
Moses Ali	NRM	Adjumani West County	Adjumani District
Jesca Ababiku	NRM	Women's Representative	Adjumani District
Otto Edward Kapiito Makmot	INDEP	Agago County	Agago District
Ogenga Latigo Moris	FDC	Agago North County	Agago District
Akello Judith Franca	FDC	Women's Representative	Agago District
Denis Hamson Obua	NRM	Ajuri County	Alebtong District
Samuel Okwir	INDEP	Moroto County	Alebtong District
Christine Ayo Achen	NRM	Women's Representative	Alebtong District
Anthony Okello	NRM	Kioga County	Amolatar District
Doreen Amule	NRM	Women's Representative	Amolatar District
Christopher Akorikimoi	INDEP	Upe County	Amudat District
Rosemary Nauwat	INDEP	Women's Representative	Amudat District
Musa Francis Ecweru	NRM	Amuria County	Amuria District
Julius Peter Ochen	INDEP	Kapelebyong County	Amuria District
Haji Abubaker Jeje Odongo	NRM	Orungo County	Amuria District
Susan Amero	NRM	Women's Representative	Amuria District
Akol Anthony	FDC	Kilak North County	Amuru District
Olanya Gilbert	FDC	Kilak South County	Amuru District
Lucy Akello	FDC	Women's Representative	Amuru District
Tonny Ayoo	NRM	Kwania County	Apac District
Akora Maxwell Ebong Patrick	UPC	Maruzi County	Apac District
Awor Betty Engola	NRM	Women's Representative	Apac District
Kassiano Wadri	INDEP	Arua Municipality	Arua District
Atiku Bernard	INDEP (Note: Atiku was a member of the Forum for Democratic Change in the ninth Parliament, but ran for the tenth as an independent. "FDC's Atiku decides to contest as an Independent". 10 November 2015.)	Ayivu County	Arua District
Ismail Ogama	NRM	Lower Madi County	Arua District
Obiga Mario Kania	NRM	Terego East County	Arua District
Moses Angundru	NRM	Terego West County	Arua District
Etuuka Isaac	NRM	Upper Madi County	Arua District
Ajedra Gabriel Gadison Aridru	NRM	Vurra County	Arua District
Mourine Osoru	NRM	Women's Representative	Arua District
Mbogo Kezekia	NRM	Budaka County	Budaka District
Robert Kasolo	NRM	Iki-Iki County	Budaka District
Kamugo Pamela Nasiyo	NRM	Women's Representative	Budaka District
Geofrey Watenga	INDEP	Lutseshe County	Bududa District
John Baptist Nambeshe	NRM	Manjiya County	Bududa District
Justine Khainza	NRM	Women's Representative	Bududa District
Solomon Silwany	NRM	Bukooli County Central	Bugiri District
Gaster K Mugoya	NRM	Bukooli County North	Bugiri District
Agnes Taaka Wejuli	NRM	Women's Representative	Bugiri District
Francis Mwijukye	FDC	Buhweju County	Buhweju District
Oliver Katwesigye Koyekyenga	INDEP	Women's Representative	Buhweju District
Paul S Musoke	NRM	Buikwe County North	Buikwe District
David R Mutebi	NRM	Buikwe County South	Buikwe District
Isaac Mulindwa Ssozi	NRM	Lugazi Municipality	Buikwe District
Judith Babirye	NRM	Women's Representative	Buikwe District
John Bosco Ikojo	NRM	Bukedea County	Bukedea District
Isiagi Patrick Opolot	NRM	Kachumbala County	Bukedea District
Anita Among	NRM	Women's Representative	Bukedea District
Ruth Katushabe	NRM	Bukomansimbi North County	Bukomansimbi District
Deogratious D Kiyingi	DP	Bukomansimbi South County	Bukomansimbi District
Veronica Nanyondo	DP	Women's Representative	Bukomansimbi District
Reuben Paul Chelimo	NRM	Kongasis County	Bukwo District
Everlyn Chemutai	NRM	Women's Representative	Bukwo District
Alex Burundo Musingo	NRM	Bulambuli County	Bulambuli District
Mudimi Wamukuyu	NRM	Elgon County	Bulambuli District
Sarah Nambozo Wekomba	INDEP	Women's Representative	Bulambuli District
Stephen Mukitale Biraahwa	INDEP	Buliisa County	Buliisa District
Norah Bigirwa-Nyendwoha	NRM	Women's Representative	Buliisa District
Christopher Kibanzanga	NRM (Note: Kibanzanga defected from the FDC in 2015. "FDC's Christopher Kibanzanga crosses to NRM". NTV. September 2015.)	Bughendera County	Bundibugyo District
Richard Gafabusa	NRM	Bwamba County	Bundibugyo District
Josephine Babungi Bebona	NRM	Women's Representative	Bundibugyo District
Gordon Arinda	NRM	Bushenyi-Ishaka Municipality	Bushenyi District
Mawanda Michael Maranga	INDEP	Igara County East	Bushenyi District
Raphael Magyezi	NRM	Igara County West	Bushenyi District
Mary Karooro Okurut Busingye	NRM	Women's Representative	Bushenyi District
Geoffrey Macho	NRM	Busia Municipality	Busia District
Gideon Onyango	INDEP	Samia Bugwe County North	Busia District
Julius Maganda	NRM	Samia Bugwe County South	Busia District
Jane Kwoba Nabulindo	INDEP	Women's Representative	Busia District
Moses Nagwomu	NRM	Bunyole East County	Butaleja District
James Waluswaka	NRM	Bunyole West County	Butaleja District
Milly Mugeni	NRM	Women's Representative	Butaleja District
Muwanga M Kivumbi	DP	Butambala County	Butambala District
Lydia Daphine Mirembe	INDEP	Women's Representative	Butambala District
Robert Ndugwa Migadde	NRM	Buvuma Islands County	Buvuma District
Egunyu Janepher Nantume	NRM	Women's Representative	Buvuma District
Geofrey Dhamuzungu	NRM	Budiope East County	Buyende District
Robert Musoke	NRM	Budiope West County	Buyende District
Veronica Kadogo Babirye	INDEP	Women's Representative	Buyende District
Paul Amoru	NRM	Dokolo North County	Dokolo District
Felix Okot Ogong	NRM	Dokolo South County	Dokolo District
Cecilia Ogwal	FDC	Women's Representative	Dokolo District
Emmanuel Kalule Ssengo	NRM	Gomba East County	Gomba District
Robina Gureme Rwakoojo	NRM	Gomba West County	Gomba District
Sylvia Nayebale	NRM	Women's Representative	Gomba District
Reagan Okumu	FDC	Aswa County	Gulu District
Lyandro Komakech	DP	Gulu Municipality	Gulu District
Jacob L'Okori Oulanyah	NRM	Omoro County	Gulu District
Peter Okot	DP	Tochi County	Gulu District
Betty Aol Ochan	FDC	Women's Representative	Gulu District
Pius Wakabi	NRM	Bugahya County	Hoima District
Daniel M. Muheirwe	NRM	Buhaguzi County	Hoima District
Lawrence Nkooto Bategeka	NRM	Hoima Municipality	Hoima District
Tophace Kaahwa	NRM	Women's Representative	Hoima District
David Karubanga	NRM	Kigorobya County	Hoima District
Guma Gumisiriza	NRM	Ibanda County North	Ibanda District
John Byabagambi	NRM	Ibanda County South	Ibanda District
Jovrine Kyomukama Kaliisa	NRM	Women's Representative	Ibanda District
Abdu Katuntu	FDC	Bugweri County	Iganga District
Peter Mugema Panadol	NRM	Iganga Municipality	Iganga District
Bwino Fred Kyakulaga	NRM	Kigulu County North	Iganga District
Andrew Kiiza Kaluya	INDEP	Kigulu County South	Iganga District
Grace Hailat Kaudha	NRM	Women's Representative	Iganga District
Stephen Kangwagye	NRM	Bukanga County	Isingiro District
Rwamirama Bright	NRM	Isingiro County North	Isingiro District
Alex B Byarugaba	NRM	Isingiro County South	Isingiro District
Justine Ayebazibwe Kashaija	NRM	Women's Representative	Isingiro District
Nelson Lufafa	NRM	Butembe County	Jinja District
Nathan Samson Igeme Nabeta	NRM	Jinja Municipality East	Jinja District
Moses Balyeku	NRM	Jinja Municipality West	Jinja District
Moses M Walyomu (Note: Walyomu's victory in the 2016 General Election was nullified by the court following accusations of bribery, but he was ultimately cleared to stand in the resulting by-election, which he won. "NRM's Walyomu wins Kagoma county by-election, challenger to go to court again". Monitor. 11 May 2017.)	NRM	Kagoma County	Jinja District
Loy Katali	NRM	Women's Representative	Jinja District
Samson Lokeris	NRM	Dodoth East County	Kaabong District
Simon Lokodo	NRM	Dodoth West County	Kaabong District
Hillary Lokwang	NRM	Ike County	Kaabong District
Nakwang Christine Tubo	NRM	Women's Representative	Kaabong District
Andrew Baryayanga	INDEP	Kabale Municipality	Kabale District
Wilfred Niwagaba	INDEP	Ndorwa County East	Kabale District
David Bahati	NRM	Ndorwa County West	Kabale District
Henry A Musasizi	NRM	Rubanda County East	Kabale District
Denis Sabiiti	NRM	Rubanda County West	Kabale District
Herbert Kabafunzaki	NRM	Rukiga County	Kabale District
Catherine Ndamira	NRM	Women's Representative	Kabale District
Adolf Mwesige	NRM	Bunyangabu County	Kabarole District
Margaret Muhanga	NRM	Burahya County	Kabarole District
Alex Ruhunda	NRM	Fort Portal Municipality	Kabarole District
Sylvia Rwabogo	NRM	Women's Representative	Kabarole District
Veronica Bichetero Isala Eragu	NRM	Kaberamaido County	Kaberamaido District
Clement Kenneth Ongalo-Obote	NRM	Kalaki County	Kaberamaido District
Maria Goretti Ajilo	NRM	Women's Representative	Kaberamaido District
Julius Mukasa	INDEP	Bujumba County	Kalangala District
Birungi C Nanyondo	NRM	Kyamuswa County	Kalangala District
Idah Nabayiga	NRM	Women's Representative	Kalangala District
Kenneth Lubogo	NRM	Bulamogi County	Kaliro District
Frederick Ngobi Gume	NRM	Bulamogi North West County	Kaliro District
Margaret K Mbeiza	NRM	Women's Representative	Kaliro District
Vincent Ssempijja	NRM	Kalungu East County	Kalungu District
Joseph Ssewungu	DP	Kalungu West County	Kalungu District
Aisha Sekindi	NRM	Women's Representative	Kalungu District
Muhammad Nsereko	INDEP	Kampala Central Division	Kampala District
Latif Sengendo Sebaggala	INDEP	Kawempe Division North	Kampala District
Mubarak Munyagwa	FDC	Kawempe Division South	Kampala District
Ibrahim Kasozi	FDC	Makindye Division East	Kampala District
Allan Ssewanyana	DP	Makindye Division West	Kampala District
Michael Kabaziguruka	FDC	Nakawa Division	Kampala District
Moses Kasibante	INDEP	Rubaga Division North	Kampala District
Kato Lubwama	INDEP	Rubaga Division South	Kampala District
Nabilah Naggayi Sempala	FDC	Women's Representative	Kampala District
Moses Kizige	NRM	Bugabula County North	Kamuli District
Henry Maurice Kibalya	NRM	Bugabula County South	Kamuli District
Isaac Musumba	NRM	Buzaaya County	Kamuli District
Rehema Watongola (Note: Watongola's victory in the 2016 General Election was nullified by the court over a lack of adequate documentation, but she was ultimately cleared to stand in the resulting by-election, which she won. "Uganda: Ruling party candidate Rehema Watongola wins Chaotic Kamuli by-elections". AllEastAfrica. 13 April 2017.)	NRM	Kamuli Municipality	Kamuli District
Rebecca Kadaga	NRM	Women's Representative	Kamuli District
Cuthbert Abigaba	NRM	Kibale County	Kamwenge District
Frank Tumwebaze	NRM	Kibale East County	Kamwenge District
Abbas M Agaba	NRM	Kitagwenda County	Kamwenge District
Dorothy Nshaija Azairwe Kabaraitsya	NRM	Women's Representative	Kamwenge District
Chris Baryomunsi	NRM	Kinkizi County East	Kanungu District
James Ruugi Kaberuka Niringiyimana	NRM	Kinkizi County West	Kanungu District
Elizabeth B Karungi	NRM	Women's Representative	Kanungu District
Sam Cheptoris	NRM	Kapchorwa Municipality	Kapchorwa District
Kenneth Soyekwo	INDEP	Tingey County	Kapchorwa District
Rukiya K Chekamondo	NRM	Women's Representative	Kapchorwa District
Godfrey Katusabe	FDC	Bukonjo County West	Kasese District
Harold Tonny Muhindo	FDC	Bukonzo County East	Kasese District
Musabe William Nzoghu	FDC	Busongora County North	Kasese District
Jackson Mbaju Kathika	FDC	Busongora County South	Kasese District
Robert Centenary Bwambale	FDC	Kasese Municipality	Kasese District
Winnie Kiiza	FDC	Women's Representative	Kasese District
Cyrus Amodoi Imalingat (2016–17) (Note: Amodio died in a road traffic accident in March 2017, prompting a by-election. "NRM wins in Toroma". Daily Monitor. 19 May 2017.)	INDEP	Toroma County	Katakwi District
Joseph Andrew Koluo (2017–)	NRM	Toroma County	Katakwi District
Peter Ogwang	NRM	Usuk County	Katakwi District
Violet A. Akurut	NRM	Women's Representative	Katakwi District
Nsamba George Kumama	NRM	Bbale County	Kayunga District
Amos Lugoloobi	NRM	Ntenjeru County North	Kayunga District
Fred Baseke	INDEP	Ntenjeru County South	Kayunga District
Idah Erios Nantaba	INDEP	Women's Representative	Kayunga District
Onesimus Twinamasiko	INDEP	Bugangaizi East County	Kibaale District
Atwooki B Kasirivu	NRM	Bugangaizi West County	Kibaale District
Eric Musana	NRM	Buyaga East County	Kibaale District
Barnabas Tinkasiimire	NRM	Buyaga West County	Kibaale District
Matia Kasaija	NRM	Buyanja County	Kibaale District
Robinah Nabbanja	NRM	Women's Representative	Kibaale District
Kefa Kiwanuka	NRM	Kiboga East County	Kiboga District
Ruth S Nankabirwa	NRM	Women's Representative	Kiboga District
Francis Barnabas Gonahasa	FDC	Kabweri County	Kibuku District
Herbert Kinobere	INDEP	Kibuku County	Kibuku District
Kacha Jenipher Namuyangu	NRM	Women's Representative	Kibuku District
Genensio Tumuramye	NRM	Kashongi County	Kiruhura District
Gordon Bafaki	NRM	Kazo County	Kiruhura District
Fred Mwesigye	NRM	Nyabushozi County	Kiruhura District
Sheila Mwine Kabaije	NRM	Women's Representative	Kiruhura District
Jack Odur Lutanywa	NRM	Kibanda South County	Kiryandongo District
Taban Idi Amin	NRM	Kibanda North County	Kiryandongo District
Hellen Kahunde	NRM	Women's Representative	Kiryandongo District
James Nsaba Buturo	NRM	Bufumbira County East	Kisoro District
Kamara John Nizeyimana	NRM	Bufumbira County North	Kisoro District
Sam Bitangaro	NRM	Bufumbira County South	Kisoro District
Sam Byibesho	NRM	Kisoro municipality	Kisoro District
Rose Kabagyenyi	NRM	Women's Representative	Kisoro District
Henry Okello Oryem	NRM	Chua East County	Kitgum District
Okin PP Ojara	INDEP	Chua West County	Kitgum District
Beatrice Anywar	INDEP	Kitgum Municipality	Kitgum District
Margaret Lamwaka	NRM	Women's Representative	Kitgum District
James Boliba Baba	NRM	Koboko County	Koboko District
Evelyn Anite	NRM	Koboko Municipality	Koboko District
Elly Asiku	NRM	Koboko North County	Koboko District
Margaret Baba Diri	NRM	Women's Representative	Koboko District
Bonny Okello	NRM	Kole North County	Kole District
Peter Ocen	INDEP	Kole South County	Kole District
Judith Alyek	NRM	Women's Representative	Kole District
Moses Adome	NRM	Jie County	Kotido District
Margaret A. Aleper	NRM	Women's Representative	Kotido District
Ismael Orot	NRM	Kanyum County	Kumi District
Charles Ilukor	NRM	Kumi County	Kumi District
Silas Aogon	INDEP	Kumi Municipality	Kumi District
Monicah Amoding	NRM	Women's Representative	Kumi District
Lawrence Cherop Mangusho	NRM	Kween County	Kween District
Lydia Chekwel	INDEP	Women's Representative	Kween District
Innocent P Kamusiime	NRM	Butemba County	Kyankwanzi District
Yoweri Ssebikaali	NRM	Ntwetwe County	Kyankwanzi District
Ann Maria Nankabirwa	NRM	Women's Representative	Kyankwanzi District
Nsabimana Paul Asaba	NRM	Kyaka North County	Kyegegwa District
Jackson Karugaba Kafuuzi	NRM	Kyaka South County	Kyegegwa District
Stella Kizza	INDEP	Women's Representative	Kyegegwa District
Tom Butime	NRM	Mwenge Central County	Kyenjojo District
Lawrence Akugizibwe	NRM	Mwenge County North	Kyenjojo District
Aston P Kajara	NRM	Mwenge County South	Kyenjojo District
Spellanza Baguma Muhenda	NRM	Women's Representative	Kyenjojo District
Hilary Obaloker Onek	NRM	Lamwo County	Lamwo District
Molly Lanyero	NRM	Women's Representative	Lamwo District
Charles Angiro Abacanon	FDC	Erute County North	Lira District
Jonathan Odur	UPC	Erute County South	Lira District
Jimmy Akena	UPC	Lira Municipality	Lira District
Joy Ongom Atim	UPC	Women's Representative	Lira District
John N Bagoole	INDEP	Luuka North County	Luuka District
Stephen B Kisa	NRM	Luuka South County	Luuka District
Esther Mbulakubuza Mbayo	NRM	Women's Representative	Luuka District
John Chrysestom Muyingo	NRM	Bamunanika County	Luwero District
Abraham Byandala	NRM	Katikamu County North	Luwero District
Edward N Ssembatya	NRM	Katikamu County South	Luwero District
Lillian Nakate	NRM	Women's Representative	Luwero District
Joseph Muyomba Kasozi	NRM	Bukoto County Mid-West	Lwengo District
Muyanja Mbabaali	NRM	Bukoto County South	Lwengo District
Aboud Kitatta	NRM	Bukoto County West	Lwengo District
Cissy Dionizia Namujju	NRM	Women's Representative	Lwengo District
James Kakooza	INDEP	Kabula County	Lyantonde District
Pauline K Kemirembe	NRM	Women's Representative	Lyantonde District
Apollo Masika	NRM	Bubulo County East	Manafwa District
Rose Mutonyi	NRM	Bubulo County West	Manafwa District
Mary Goretti Kitutu	NRM	Women's Representative	Manafwa District
Oguzu Lee Denis	FDC	Maracha County	Maracha District
Acidri James	NRM	Maracha East County	Maracha District
Ayaka Rose Atima	NRM	Women's Representative	Maracha District
Edward K Ssekandi	NRM	Bukoto County Central	Masaka District
Florence Namayanja	DP	Bukoto County East	Masaka District
Mathias Mpuuga	DP	Masaka Municipality	Masaka District
Mary Babirye Kabanda	DP	Women's Representative	Masaka District
Patrick Kasumba	NRM	Bujenje County	Masindi District
Nyiira Zerubabel Mijumbi	NRM	Buruli County	Masindi District
Ernest Kiiza	NRM	Masindi Municipality	Masindi District
Jalia Bintu	NRM	Women's Representative	Masindi District
Waira Kyewalabye Majegere	INDEP	Bunya County East	Mayuge District
Robert Ntende	INDEP	Bunya County South	Mayuge District
Aggrey Henry Bagiire	NRM	Bunya County West	Mayuge District
Julie Zabwe Mukoda	INDEP	Women's Representative	Mayuge District
Gershom Rabbi Sizomu	FDC	Bungokho County North	Mbale District
Michael Werikhe Kafabusa	NRM	Bungokho County South	Mbale District
Jack Wamanga Wamai	FDC	Mbale Municipality	Mbale District
Connie Galiwango	NRM	Women's Representative	Mbale District
Wilberforce Yaguma	NRM	Kashari North County	Mbarara District
Nathan Itungo	NRM	Kashari South County	Mbarara District
Michael Tusiime	NRM	Mbarara Municipality	Mbarara District
Charles Ngabirano	NRM	Rwampara County	Mbarara District
Rosette Kajungu Mutambi	NRM	Women's Representative	Mbarara District
Dononzio Mugabe-Kahonda	NRM	Ruhinda County	Mitooma District
Thomas Tayebwa	NRM	Ruhinda North County	Mitooma District
Jovah Kamateeka	NRM	Women's Representative	Mitooma District
David Kalwanga Lukyamuzi	INDEP	Busujju County	Mityana District
Francis Zaake	INDEP	Mityana County North	Mityana District
Godfrey Kiwanda	NRM	Mityana County South	Mityana District
Henry Kamya Makumbi	NRM	Mityana Municipality	Mityana District
Judith Nabakooba	NRM	Women's Representative	Mityana District
John Baptist Lokii	NRM	Matheniko County	Moroto District
Fred Angella	NRM	Moroto Municipality	Moroto District
Albert Lokoru	NRM	Tepeth County	Moroto District
Annie Logiel	NRM	Women's Representative	Moroto District
Hassan Kaps Fungaroo	FDC	Obongi County	Moyo District
Alero Tom Aza	NRM	West Moyo County	Moyo District
Joyce Kaducu Moriku	NRM	Women's Representative	Moyo District
Amelia Kyambadde	NRM	Mawokota County North	Mpigi District
Lubyayi John Bosco Seguya	NRM	Mawokota County South	Mpigi District
Sarah Nakawunde	NRM	Women's Representative	Mpigi District
Micheal I Bukenya	NRM	Bukuya County	Mubende District
Kakooza Joseph	NRM	Buwekula County	Mubende District
Mbwa Tekamwa Gaffa	NRM	Kasambya County	Mubende District
Patrick O Nsamba	NRM	Kassanda County North	Mubende District
Simeo Nsubuga	NRM	Kassanda County South	Mubende District
Anthony Ssemuli	NRM	Mubende Municipality	Mubende District
Namugwanya Benna Bugembe	NRM	Women's Representative	Mubende District
Ronald Kibuule	NRM	Mukono County North	Mukono District
Johnson Muyanja Ssenyonga	NRM	Mukono County South	Mukono District
Betty Nambooze Bakireke	DP	Mukono Municipality	Mukono District
Robert Ssekitoleko Kafeero	NRM	Nakifuma County	Mukono District
Peace Kusasira	NRM	Women's Representative	Mukono District
Peter Lokeris	NRM	Chekwii County (Kadam)	Nakapiripirit District
Achia Remegio	NRM	Pian County	Nakapiripirit District
Esther D Anyakun	NRM	Women's Representative	Nakapiripirit District
Syda Bbumba	NRM	Nakaseke North County	Nakaseke District
Luttamaguzi Semakula Paulson	DP	Nakaseke South County	Nakaseke District
Sarah Najjuma	NRM	Women's Representative	Nakaseke District
Wilson Muruli Mukasa	NRM	Budyebo County	Nakasongola District
Nuwa Mutebi Wanzala	NRM	Nakasongola County	Nakasongola District
Margaret Komuhangi	NRM	Women's Representative	Nakasongola District
Abbot G Ouma	NRM	Bukooli Island County	Namayingo District
Stephen Mayende	NRM	Bukooli South County	Namayingo District
Robina Hope Mukisa	NRM	Women's Representative	Namayingo District
Persis Namuganza	INDEP	Bukono County	Namutumba District
Paul Akamba	INDEP	Busiki County	Namutumba District
Mariam Naigaga	NRM	Women's Representative	Namutumba District
Terence Naco Achia	NRM	Bokora County	Napak District
Stella Nyomera Namoe	NRM	Women's Representative	Napak District
Emmanuel Ongiertho	FDC	Jonam County	Nebbi District
Joshua Carter Anywarach	INDEP	Padyere County	Nebbi District
Jacqueline Rama Aol	NRM	Women's Representative	Nebbi District
Abala David	NRM	Ngora County	Ngora District
Amongin Jacquiline	NRM	Women's Representative	Ngora District
Ibanda Rwemulikya	NRM	Ntoroko County	Ntoroko District
Anne Mary Tumwine	INDEP	Women's Representative	Ntoroko District
Micheal Timuzigu	NRM	Kajara County	Ntungamo District
Gerald K Karuhanga	INDEP	Ntungamo Municipality	Ntungamo District
William Beijukye-Zinkuratire	NRM	Ruhaama County	Ntungamo District
Mwesigwa Rukutana	NRM	Rushenyi County	Ntungamo District
Beatrice Rwakimari	NRM	Women's Representative	Ntungamo District
Simon Oyet	FDC	Nwoya County	Nwoya District
Lilly Adong	INDEP	Women's Representative	Nwoya District
Julius Achon	NRM	Otuke County	Otuke District
Silvia Akello	NRM	Women's Representative	Otuke District
Charles Okello Engola	NRM	Oyam County North	Oyam District
Ongom Amongi Betty	UPC	Oyam County South	Oyam District
Santa Alum Ogwang	UPC	Women's Representative	Oyam District
Odonga Otto	FDC	Aruu County	Pader District
Lucy Achiro Otim (Note: Achiro's victory in the 2016 General Election was nullified by the court over non-compliance with electoral law, but she was cleared to stand in the resulting by-election, which she won. Julius Ocungi, Robert Owot and Cissy Makumbi (7 April 2017). "FDC backed Aciro Otim wins Aruu North County seat".)	INDEP	Aruu North County	Pader District
Lowila Oketayot	NRM	Women's Representative	Pader District
Francis Mukura	INDEP	Agule County	Pallisa District
Fred Oduchu Mudukoi	INDEP	Butebo County	Pallisa District
Richard Oseku	NRM	Kibale County	Pallisa District
Jacob Richards Opolot	INDEP	Pallisa County	Pallisa District
Agnes Ameede Omulen	NRM	Women's Representative	Pallisa District
Amos Mandera	NRM	Buyamba County	Rakai District
Christopher Kalemba	NRM	Kakuuto County	Rakai District
Boaz Kasirabo Ninsiima	NRM	Kooki County	Rakai District
Haruna Kyeyune	NRM	Kyotera County	Rakai District
Juliet K Suubi	NRM	Women's Representative	Rakai District
John N Twesigye	NRM	Bunyaruguru County	Rubirizi District
Hatwib Katoto	NRM	Katerera County	Rubirizi District
Grace Kesande	NRM	Women's Representative	Rubirizi District
Mary Paula Kebirungi Turyahikayo	NRM	Rubabo County	Rukungiri District
Fred Turyamuhweza	FDC	Rujumbura County	Rukungiri District
Roland Mugume Kaginda	FDC	Rukungiri Municipality	Rukungiri District
Betty Muzanira	FDC	Women's Representative	Rukungiri District
Joseph Ssekabiito	NRM	Mawogola County	Sembabule District
Sam Kutesa	NRM	Mawogola North County	Sembabule District
Anifa Kawooya Bangirana	NRM	Women's Representative	Sembabule District
Theodore Ssekikubo	NRM	Lwemiyaga County	Sembabule District
Elijah Okupa	FDC	Kasilo County	Serere District
Patrick Okabe	NRM	Serere County	Serere District
Hellen Adoa	NRM	Women's Representative	Serere District
Elioda Tumwesigye	NRM	Sheema County North	Sheema District
Ephraim Kamuntu	NRM	Sheema County South	Sheema District
Jacklet Atuhaire	INDEP	Women's Representative	Sheema District
Vincent Woboya	NRM	Budadiri County East	Sironko District
Nandala Mafabi	FDC	Budadiri County West	Sironko District
Florence Nambozo	NRM	Women's Representative	Sironko District
Cosmas Elotu	NRM	Dakabela County	Soroti District
Kenneth E Esiangu	INDEP	Soroti County	Soroti District
Herbert Edmond Ariko	FDC	Soroti Municipality	Soroti District
Angelline Osegge Asio	FDC	Women's Representative	Soroti District
Yeri Apollo Ofwono	NRM	Tororo Municipality	Tororo District
Annet Nyakecho	INDEP	Tororo North County	Tororo District
Fredrick Angura	NRM	Tororo South County	Tororo District
Richard Othieno Okoth	NRM	West Budama County North	Tororo District
Marksons Jacob Oboth	INDEP	West Budama County South	Tororo District
Sarah Achieng Opendi	INDEP	Women's Representative	Tororo District
Medard Lubega Sseggona	DP	Busiro County East	Wakiso District
Dennis Ssozi Galabuzi	NRM	Busiro County North	Wakiso District
Peter Sematimba	NRM	Busiro County South	Wakiso District
Rosemary Tumusiime	NRM	Entebbe Municipality	Wakiso District
Ibrahim Ssemujju Nganda	FDC	Kira Municipality	Wakiso District
Robert Kyagulanyi Ssentamu (Note: Apollo Kantinti (FDC) was originally declared the winner of the seat, before his victory was challenged in the courts. Kyagulanyi was declared the winner of the resulting by-election. Kizza, Joseph (29 June 2017). "Bobi Wine overwhelmingly wins Kyadondo East seat". New Vision.)	INDEP	Kyadondo County East	Wakiso District
Ssempala Kigozi Emmanuel	DP	Makindye-Ssabagabo Municipality	Wakiso District
Musoke Nsereko Wakayima	DP	Nansana Municipality	Wakiso District
Rosemary Nansubuga Seninde	NRM	Women's Representative	Wakiso District
Margaret Rwabushaija	INDEP	Workers' Representative	Workers District
Agnes Kunihira	NRM	Workers' Representative	Workers District
Sam Lyomoki	NRM	Workers' Representative	Workers District
Charles Bakkabulindil	NRM	Workers' Representative	Workers District
Arinaitwe Rwakajara	NRM	Workers' Representative	Workers District
Ashraf Olega	NRM	Aringa County	Yumbe District
Godfrey Onzima	NRM	Aringa North County	Yumbe District
Yorke Odria Alioni	INDEP	Aringa South County	Yumbe District
Zaitun Driwaru	INDEP	Women's Representative	Yumbe District
Simon D'Ujanga	NRM	Okoro County	Zombo District
Lawrence Biyika Onegiu	NRM	Ora County	Zombo District
Grace Freedom Kwiyucwiny	NRM	Women's Representative	Zombo District
Safia Juuko Nalule	NRM	Representative of People with Disabilities (National Female)	
Alex Ndeezi	NRM	Representative of People with Disabilities (Central region)	
Katuramu Kiribedda	INDEP	Representative of People with Disabilities (Western region)	
William Nokrach	INDEP	Representative of People with Disabilities (Northern region)	
Hellen Asamo	INDEP	Representative of People with Disabilities (Eastern region)	
Oscar Omony	NRM	Representative of the Youth (Northern region)	
Sarah Babirye	NRM	Representative of the Youth (Central region)	
Mwine Mpaka	NRM	Representative of the Youth (Western region)	
Ishma Mafabi	INDEP	Representative of the Youth (Eastern region)	
Anna Ebaju Adeke	INDEP	Representative of the Youth (National Female)	
Katumba Wamala	Representative of the Uganda People's Defence Forces		
Elly Tumwine	Representative of the Uganda People's Defence Forces		
Ivan Koreta	Representative of the Uganda People's Defence Forces		
Pecos Kutesa	Representative of the Uganda People's Defence Forces		
Innocent Oula	Representative of the Uganda People's Defence Forces		
Felix Kulayigye	Representative of the Uganda People's Defence Forces		
Flavia Byekwaso	Representative of the Uganda People's Defence Forces		
Asiimwe Evarlyne Buregyeya	Representative of the Uganda People's Defence Forces		
Susan Lakot	Representative of the Uganda People's Defence Forces		
Francis Takirwa	Representative of the Uganda People's Defence Forces		
Aadroa Alex Onzima	Ex officio member		
Aceng Jane Ruth	Ex officio member		
Byaruhanga William	Ex officio member		
Egunyu Akiror Agnes	Ex officio member		
Kafura Joy Kabatsi	Ex officio member		
Kahinda Otafiire	Ex officio member		
Kamya Beti	Ex officio member		
Kataaha Museveni Janet	Ex officio member		
Kirunda Kivejinja	Ex officio member		
Mateke Philemon	Ex officio member		
Mukwaya Balunzi Janat	Ex officio member		
Muloni Irene	Ex officio member		
Mutuuzo Peace Regis	Ex officio member		
Nadduli Abdul	Ex officio member		
Nakiwala Florence Kiyingi	Ex officio member		
Ntege Azuba	Ex officio member		
Ruhakana Rugunda	Ex officio member		
Tumukunde Henry	Ex officio member		
