= Jovrine Kyomukama Kaliisa =

Ugandan politician and businesswoman

Hon. Jovrine Kyomukama Kaliisa
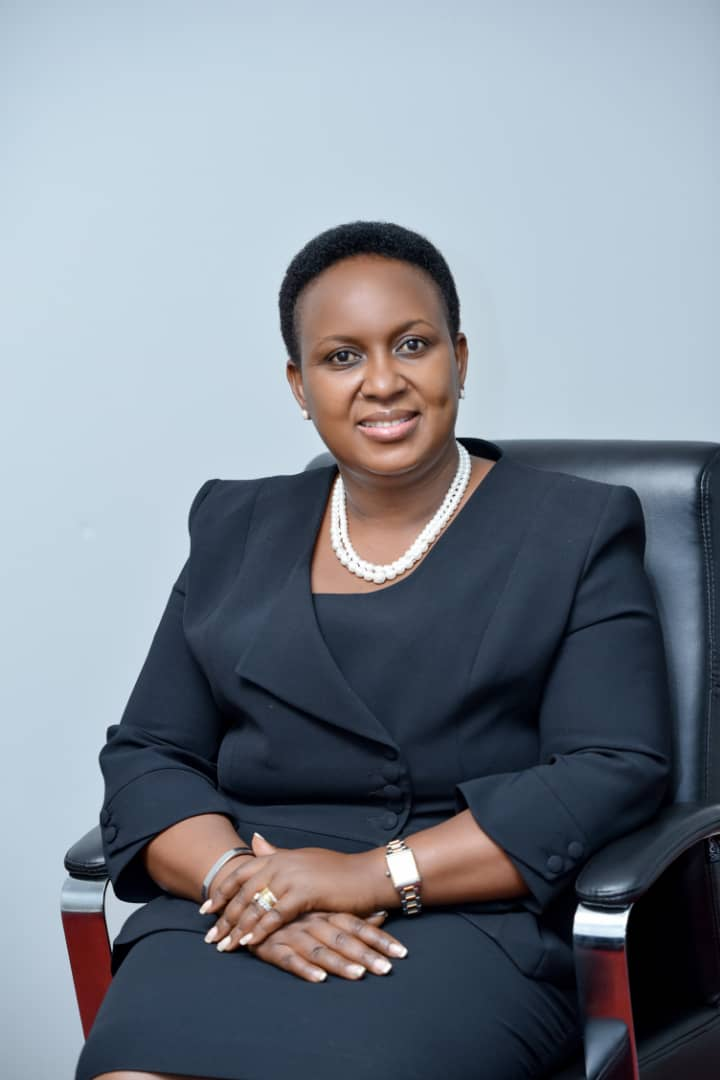

National Deputy Coordinator, Parish Development Model
- In office 2016–Incumbent

Personal details
- Born: 17 August 1975 (age 51) Uganda
- Citizenship: Uganda
- Party: National Resistance Movement
- Spouse: Married
- Children: 4
- Education: University of Portsmouth; Institute of Business and Media Studies, Kampala
- Occupation: Politician, businesswoman
- Profession: Businesswoman
- Known for: Leadership in Parish Development Model; service in Parliament; community development advocacy
- Committees: Committee on HIV/AIDS & Related Diseases; Committee on Public Service and Local Government

Hon. Jovrine Kyomukama Kaliisa (born 17 August 1975) is a Ugandan politician and businesswoman, currently serving as the National Deputy Coordinator of the Parish Development Model.She was the district woman representative of Ibanda and affiliated to the National Resistance Movement political party. In 2021-2026 elections, she was the aspiring Woman MP for Ibanda District under the National Resistance Movement political party, however she didn't win the elections. and also contesting as chairperson in women's league 2026-2031

== Early life and education ==
Kyomukama was born on 17 August 1975. She holds a master’s degree in international relations from the University of Portsmouth, United Kingdom. She also holds a bachelor’s degree in risk and security management from the University of Portsmouth, United Kingdom, and a diploma in mass communication from the Institute of Business and Media Studies, Kampala.

She attended St Helens Primary School, Nyamitanga for her Primary Leaving Examinations in 1989 and later joined Lugogo Hall Centre for Uganda Certificate Of Education in 2011. She holds Uganda Advanced Certificate of Education from Buganda College, Wakiso in 2013.

== Career ==
=== Before politics ===
From 2005 to date, Kyomukama been employed as the Director of Crane Coaches Ltd. Between 1994 and 1997, she worked as the Radio Presenter at Radio Uganda. In the year 1998–2002, she served as the Sales Manager at Sales International Uganda. From 2002 to 2005, she was working at UGAWood Construction Company as a Manager.

=== Political career ===
Kyomukama serves in the government as the National Deputy Coordinator of Parish Development Model. She is the Women Chairperson of the Women League in Ibanda District and a member of the Construction Committee in Ibanda Parish. From 2016 to date, Jovrine served as the Member of Parliament at Parliament of Uganda. While at the Parliament of Uganda, she served on the Committee on HIV/AIDS & Related Disease and Committee on Public Service and Local Government. In 2020, she was arrested and detained at Ibanda Police Station on Thursday evening for flouting COVID-19 guidelines, dishing out money and campaigning past deadline. In the 10 Parliament, she was the member of the Uganda Women Parliamentary Association. She was a Winner of Service Award in recognition for distinguished service as a Member of Parliament who lobbied for Kibubura Girls School in 2023.

== Personal life ==
Kyomukama is married and has four children. Her hobbies are reading and swimming and she has a special interest in community work.

== See also ==
- List of members of the tenth Parliament of Uganda
- Parliament of Uganda
- Member of Parliament
