= Margaret Komuhangi =

Ugandan politician (born 1970)

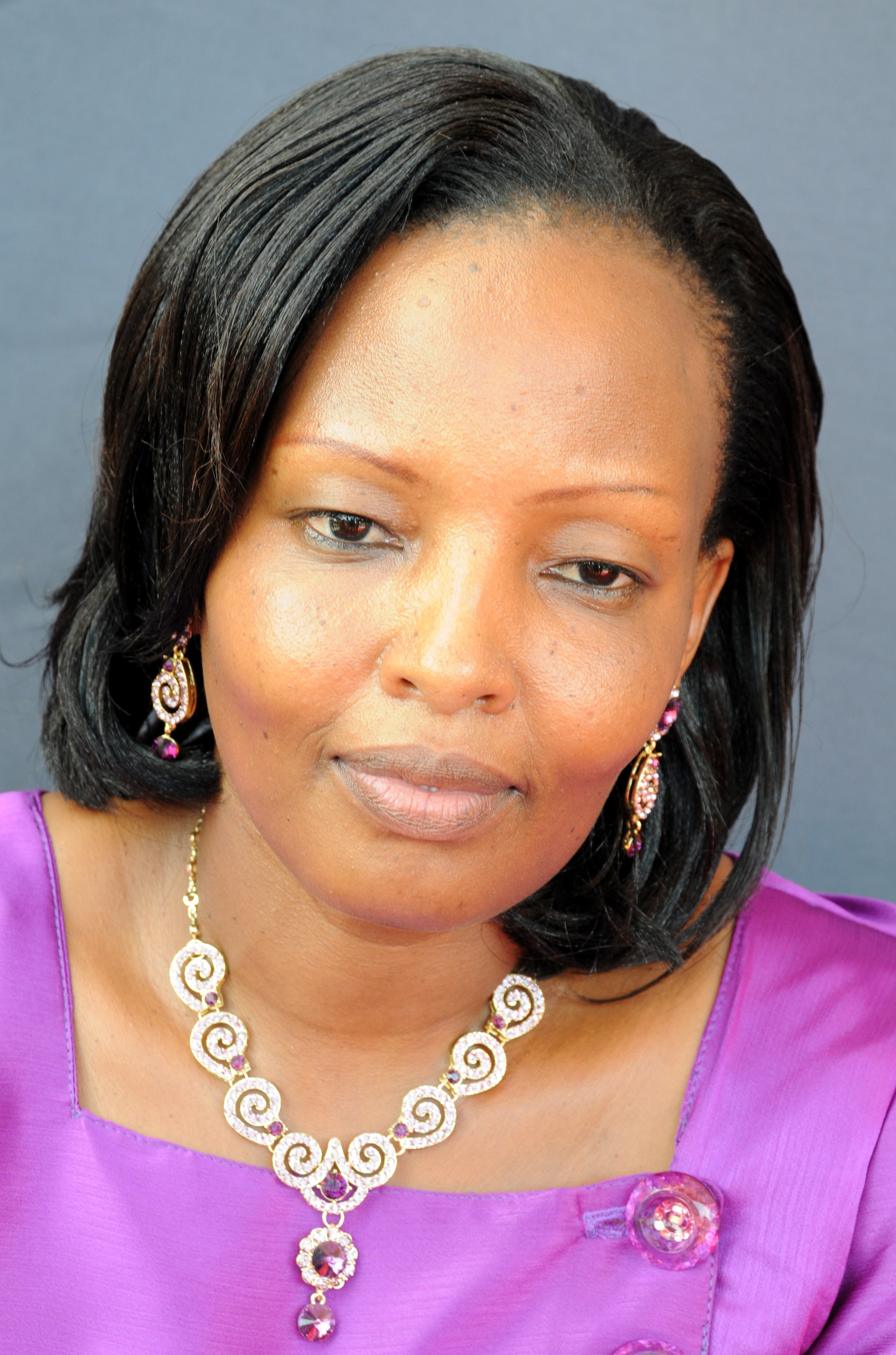
- Born: 26 December 1970; Nakasongola District DEATH Date 16 January 2025; Nakasongola District
- Citizenship: Uganda
- Education: Makerere University; Makerere University Business School
- Occupation: Politician
- Years active: 2001 - 2025
- Known for: Politics
- Title: Honourable Member of Parliament
- Political party: National Resistance Movement (NRM)

Margaret Komuhangi (born December 26, 1970) was a Ugandan politician. She was the elected

(Died 16, Jan 2025) Woman Member of Parliament for Nakasongola District on NRM ticket. NRM is the ruling political party in Uganda. She previously served as the chairperson, committee on Gender, Labour and Social Development, from 2014 to 2018.

== Background and education ==
Komuhangi attended Nakasongola Primary School in Nakasongola District for her primary studies where she obtained the Primary Leaving Examinations (PLE) certificate in 1983. She then joined St. Mathias Kalemba Senior Secondary School, Nazigo for her O-Level studies where she obtained the Uganda Certificate of Education (UCE) in 1987. She attended Makerere High School for her A-Level education where she obtained the Uganda Advanced Certificate of Education (UACE) in 1989. She was admitted to Makerere University, which is Uganda's largest public university, where she graduated with a Bachelor of Arts in Education in 1994.

She also holds a Masters in Business Administration obtained in 2006 from Makerere University Business School.

== Career ==
From 1994 to 2000, Komuhangi served as a coordinator, Pan African Women Liberation Organ, Pan African Movement. In 1998, she served as a board member of Akina Mama wa Africa which is a feminist Pan-African Leadership Development Organisation until 2000. From 2001 until 2003, she served as a member of National Red Cross Council, Luweero District.

=== Parliament ===
In 2001, she entered elective politics by contesting as the parliamentary women representative of Nakasongola District, the first for the district. She was recalled in 2003, due in part to a petition. Komuhangi later beat Tubwita in the 2010 National Resistance Movement primary, and won her seat back in 2011. In 2016, she was re-elected. She served as the chairperson, the Uganda parliamentary committee on Gender, Labour and Social Development from 2014 until 2018.

During her time in parliament, Komuhangi has been active on women's issues. She fought for better enforcement of laws prohibiting female genital mutilation, both in Uganda and the surrounding region. Komuhangi worked in a parliamentary committee to pass a law that encourages Ugandans to adopt orphaned or needy children. She spoke out against a string of murders or women and girls in Entebbe, many killed for ritual or witchcraft purposes. Between 2017 and 2018, child marriages in Komuhangi's district of Nakasongola decreased by 20%, due in part to increases in funding for daycares, nursery schools, and vocational training.

==== Committee assignments ====
She has the following additional parliamentary responsibilities:

- Member of the Budget Committee
- Member of the Business committee

== See also ==
- List of members of the tenth Parliament of Uganda
- Districts of Uganda
