= Cissy Dionizia Namujju =

Ugandan legislator

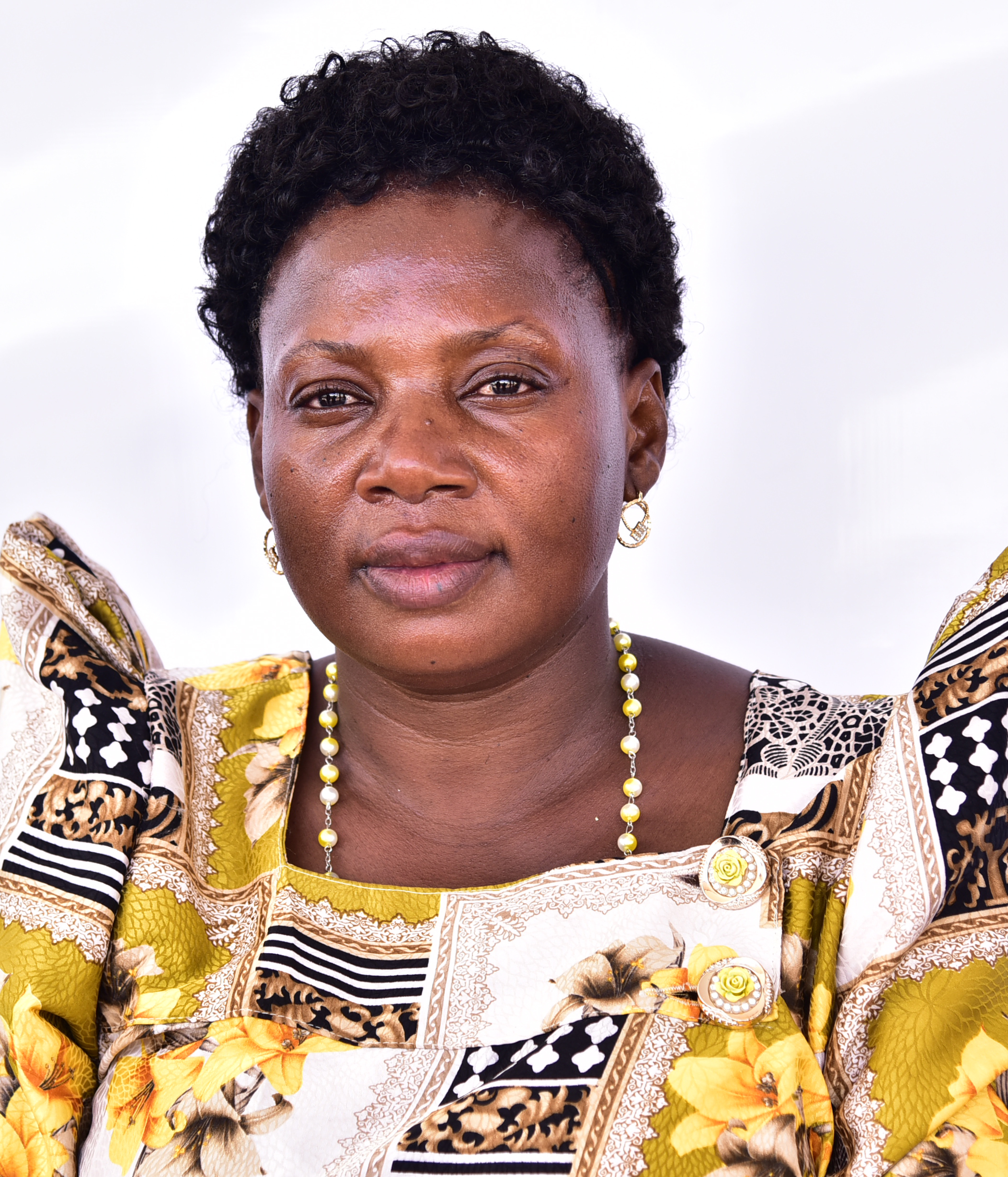
- Born: 15 July 1977 (age 48)
- Citizenship: Uganda
- Occupation: Politician
- Years active: 2016 – present
- Known for: Politics
- Title: Member of Parliament

Cissy Dionizia Namujju (born 15 July 1977) is a Ugandan legislator, and an ICT Expert. As of March 2021, she serves as the elected woman representative for Lwengo District in Uganda's eleventh parliament. Politically, she is affiliated to the National Resistance Movement under whose ticket she contested in the 2021 general election. Cissy has also served in Uganda's tenth Parliament under the same political party.

== Early life and education ==
Cissy Dionizia Namujju was born on 15 July 1977. She attained the Uganda Certificate of Education (UCE) in 2005 and the Uganda Advanced Certificate of Education (UACE) in 2007 from Modern Secondary School. She holds Diploma in Information Systems Management from APTECH (2010).

== Career ==
Cissy Namujju was a supervisor at AGOA Girls (2002-2003) before serving as a political mobilizer for the State House (2003 - 2015). Since 2016 to date she has been a member of parliament. In Uganda's tenth Parliament, she serves on the Foreign Affairs Committee and the Science and Technology Committee.

== Personal life ==
She is single. Her hobbies are Sports and Reading. Cissy's interests are Caring for The Elderly, Widows and Orphans, Promoting Modern Farming and Community Sensitization.

== See also ==
- National Resistance Movement
- Member of parliament
- Lwengo District
- Parliament of Uganda
- List of members of the tenth Parliament of Uganda
