= Molly Lanyero =

Ugandan politician

- Born: February 24, 1975 (age 51); Uganda
- Citizenship: Uganda
- Education: Kyambogo University (Diploma in Secondary Education); Makerere University (Bachelor of Arts in Social Sciences) (Master of Arts in Peace and Conflict Studies)
- Occupations: Teacher & Politician
- Years active: 2005 to present
- Known for: Politics
- Title: Member of Parliament for Lamwo District Woman Representative
- Spouse: (Married)

Molly Lanyero (born 24 February 1975) is a Ugandan politician who was elected to the 10th Parliament (2016-2021), as a District Woman Representative representing Lamwo District.

In July 2016, she was elected as treasurer to the 25-member Acholi Parliamentary Group, comprising the members of parliament from the Acholi sub-region in the 10th Parliament. She is a member of the National Resistance Movement (NRM)

Lanyero serves on the Parliamentary Committee on Human Rights and the Parliamentary Committee on Education and Sports, and she is a member of the Uganda Women Parliamentary Association (UWOPA).

== Early life and education ==
Molly Lanyero was born on 24 February 1975. She attended Shimoni Demonstration School until 1988. In 1992, she earned a Uganda Certificate of Education (UCE) from St. Joseph's Senior Secondary School Naggalama. In 1995, she earned a Uganda Advanced Certificate of Education (UACE), from Bweranyangi Girls' Senior Secondary School. Then in 1997, she earned a Diploma in Secondary Education from the Institute of Teacher Education Kyambogo (ITEK), which now is a component of Kyambogo University. Lanyero completed her advanced studies at Makerere University. She was awarded a Bachelor of Arts in Social Sciences in 2001 and a Master of Arts in Peace and Conflict Studies in 2008.

== Career ==
Between 2002 until 2009, Ms Lanyero served as the Deputy Headmistress at Hillside High School in Bunamwaya, a suburb of Kampala, Uganda's capital city. She concurrently served as Project Coordinator for the Foundation for Early Childhood Education & Development, from 2005 until 2007.

From 2013 until 2014, she was Associate Director for the Regional Associates for Community Development, a non-government organisation. In 2014 and 2015, she served as a Grant Consultant at the Embassy of Japan in Kampala, Uganda.

== Controversy ==
In January 2018, Molly Lanyero, and four other Members of Parliament (Beatrice Atim Anywar, Edward Otto Makmot, Catherine Lamwaka and Margaret Odwa), were suspended from the Acholi Parliamentary Group (APG), for supporting the lifting of Presidential age limit.
