= Janet Grace Akech Okori-Moe =

Ugandan teacher and legislator (born 1966)

Honourable Janet Grace Akech Okori
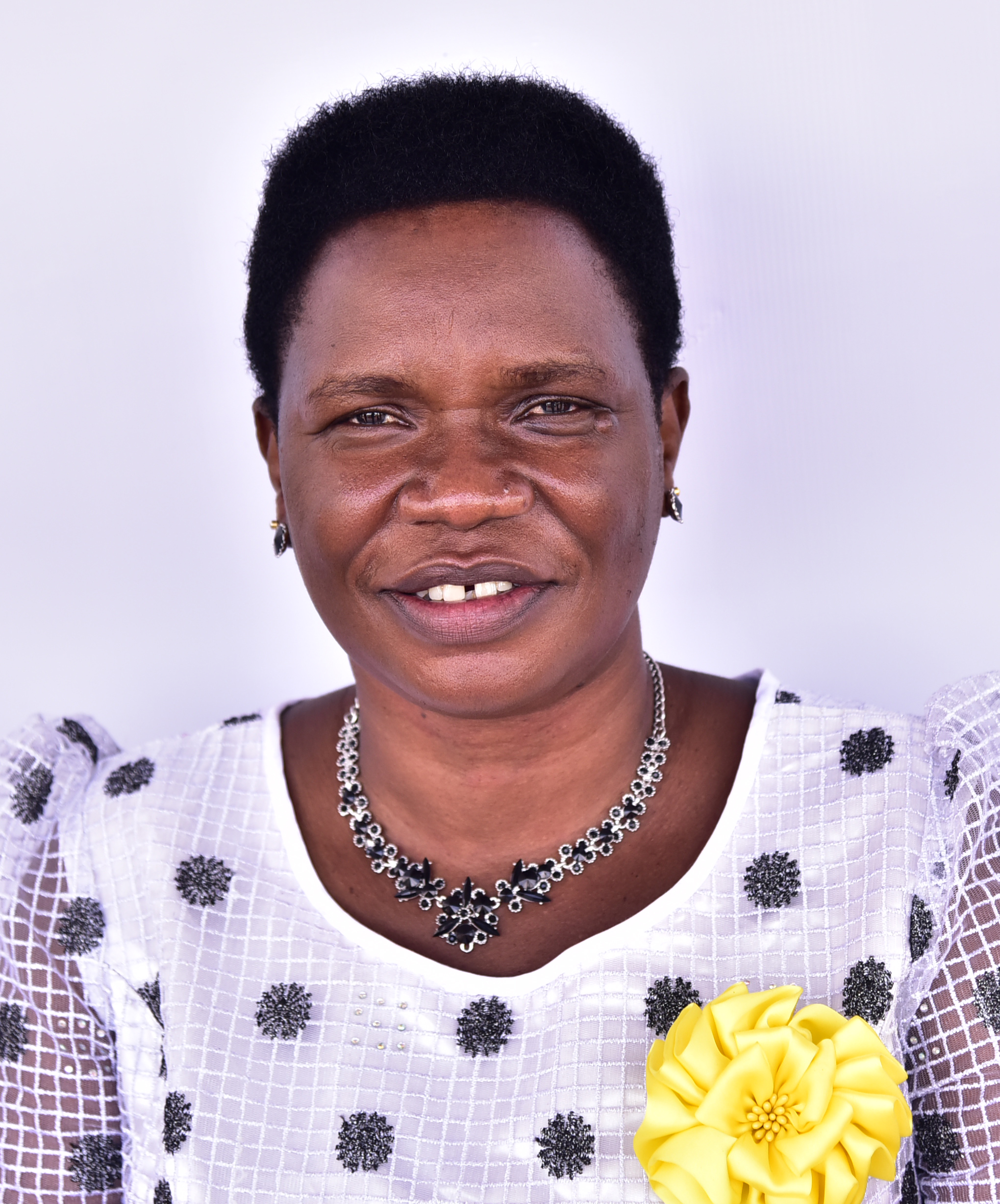

Woman member of parliament
- Constituency: ABIM District

Personal details
- Born: September 3, 1966 (age 60)
- Education: Makerere University
- Profession: Teacher

Janet Grace Akech Okori-Moe (born September 3, 1966) is a Ugandan teacher and legislator. She served as the elected woman representative for Abim District in Uganda's tenth parliament. Politically, she is affiliated to the National Resistance Movement under whose ticket she contested in the 2016 general election. in the 2021 Uganda general elections, She retained her seat as woman mp for Abim district in the 11th Parliament of Uganda.

== Early life and education ==
Okori-Moe was born on 3 September 1966. She sat for her Primary Leaving Examinations (PLE) in 1979 at Abim Primary School. She later attained the Uganda Certificate of Education (UCE) in 1983 from Kangole Girls Senior Secondary School and the Uganda Advanced Certificate of Education (UACE) in 1986 from Moroto High School. Okori-Moe also holds an ordinary Diploma in Education from Makerere University (1989) as well as an Advanced Diploma in Educational Planning and Management from Kyambogo University (1999). In 2000, she obtained a bachelor's degree in Social Sciences from Makerere University followed by a Master of Science in Social Sector Planning and Management in 2006.

== Career ==
Okori-Moe was a tutor at Moroto Teachers College (1992–1994) before serving as a delegate in Uganda's Constituent Assembly (1994–1995). She served as a Member of Parliament twice before, 1996–2001 and 2006–2011. Immediately prior to her current elective position, she was a Senior Presidential Advisor on Education in the Office of the President (2013–2015).

In Uganda's tenth Parliament, she serves as the Chairperson of the Committee on Agriculture, Vice Chairperson on the Parliamentary Committee on Foreign Affairs in addition to being a member of the Appointments Committee.

== See also ==
- Abim District
- List of members of the eleventh Parliament of Uganda.
