= Lucy Achiro Otim =

Ugandan politician

- Born: 28 September 1986 (age 39)
- Education: Mary Immaculate primary school, Sacred Heart secondary school, Merry Land High School,
- Alma mater: Makerere University
- Occupation: politician

Achiro Lucy Otim, commonly referred to as Lucy Achiro Otim (born 28 September 1986) is a female Ugandan politician and a Gender Specialist. She is the district woman representative for Aruu North County consistency, Pader district in the 10th Parliament. Achiro belongs to an independent political party at the Parliament of Uganda. She won the parliamentary seat running as an independent candidate in 2016. Her tenure as member of parliament was cut short when the Ugandan supreme court nullified her election for non-compliance with electoral laws because the electoral commission failed to carry out a vote recount after she had won with a two vote margin, beating James Nabinson Kidega of the National Resistance Movement (NRM). However, she returned as member of parliament after being re-elected Aruu north member of parliament in the April 2017 election by again beating Kidega, this time 64 percent to 32 percent.

== Education and background ==
She is married. Achiro attended Mary Immaculate primary school for her primary education and completed her primary leaving examinations (PLE) in 1998. She then enrolled at Sacred Heart secondary school, in Gulu, where she sat her Uganda Certificate of Education (UCE) in 2002. She attended Merry Land High School for her A'level education, completing her Uganda Advanced Certificate of Education (UACE) in 2004. She then attended Makerere University and graduated with a Bachelor's degree in social sciences in 2008. She later on added a master's degree in gender studies in 2014 from the same university.

== Career history ==
Achiro has served as executive director of the women and children protection initiative from 2012 to date. She also served as women empowerment coordinator for United States Agency for International Development (USAID), Adventist Development and Relief Agency(ADRA) in 2012. She was also a gender specialist oxfam international in 2009, and was gender/child protection specialist UN Women in 2011.

Achiro is currently serving as member of parliament, representing Aruu north constituency in the Parliament of Uganda. In parliament she serves on the committee on human rights and the committee on gender labour and social development. She is a shadow cabinet minister of gender labour and social development

She is a full member of two professional bodies; Child protection working group of Uganda, and Gender cluster of South Sudan. She is also a member of the Uganda Women Parliamentary Association (UWOPA).

== Controversy ==
Achiro's election was first nullified by the High Court in June 2016 over non compliance with the electoral laws and the Electoral commission was ordered to conduct fresh elections. Lucy Achiro Otim was then re-elected the Member of Parliament for Aruu North constituency in Pader district after defeating five other candidates in a by-election organized to fill the seat that fell vacant in a February 6 Supreme Court ruling. She said after winning the elections that her team faced a lot of intimidation and financial challenges although they managed to sailed through.

In 2017, Achiro Lucy Otim fainted at the Parliament Chambers during a protest by Opposition Members of Parliament and was carried out of the Parliament chambers after fainting.

== See also ==
- Aruu County North MP sworn in.
- Pader District
- List of members of the tenth Parliament of Uganda
- Odonga Otto
