= Violet A. Akurut =

Ugandan politician and teacher

Violet A Akurut

Woman Member of Parliament for Katakwi District
- In office 2016–2021

Personal details
- Born: Akurut Violet Adome; August 25, 1976 (age 50) Uganda
- Party: National Resistance Movement
- Spouse: Married
- Education: Makerere University (B.Ed); Uganda Martyrs University (M.A)
- Alma mater: Makerere University; Uganda Martyrs University; Uganda Management Institute
- Occupation: Politician, Teacher
- Profession: Politician, Educator
- Known for: Politics
- Committees: Committee on HIV/AIDS & Related Diseases; Committee on Education and Sports

Violet A Akurut also known as Akurut Violet Adome (born 25 August 1976) is a Ugandan politician and teacher by profession. She was the district woman representative of Katakwi District in the 10th Parliament of Uganda. She is a member of the National Resistance Movement political party. She was the aspiring Woman Member of Parliament 2021–2026, of Katakwi under NRM political party.

== Early life and education ==
Violet was born on 25 August 1976. In 1989, she completed her Primary Leaving Examination from Madera Girls Primary School and later joined Kangole Girls Senior Secondary School for her Uganda Certificate of Education in 1993. In 1996, she finished her Uganda Advanced Certificate of Education from Tororo Girls School. In 1999, she obtained a certificate in project planning and management from Uganda Management Institute. In 2003, she was awarded a bachelor's degree in education from Makerere University. She holds a post graduate diploma in resource mobilization and management from Uganda Management Institute, which she got in 2010. She later went back to get a master's degree in diplomacy and international studies from Uganda Martyrs University in 2016.

== Career ==
=== Before politics ===
From 2012 to 2016, Violetrked as the commissioner at Uganda Human Rights Commission. In 2012, she was the co-ordinator at Women of Uganda Network. Between 2010 and 2011, she was employed as the programme manager at Transform Uganda. From 2009 to 2010, she was the programme officer at ANPPCAN. She worked as the programme co-ordinator at World Vision International in 2007–2008. In 2002–2005, she worked at Education Department, Soroti Catholic Diocese, as the programme manager. She was the gender officer at Katakwi District Local Government in the year 2000–2001. From 2012 to date, she has served as the chairperson of the Advisory Board at Katakwi Grassroots Women Development Initiative. Also from 2015 to date, she has worked as the executive treasurer at Uganda National AIDS Services Organization.

=== Political life ===
From 2016 to 2021, Violet served as a member of Parliament at the Parliament of Uganda. While at the Parliament of Uganda, she was the member on the Committee on HIV/AIDS & Related Disease, and Committee on Education and Sports.

== Personal life ==
Violet is married.

== See also ==
- List of members of the tenth Parliament of Uganda
- Katakwi District
- Parliament of Uganda
- National Resistance Movement
- Member of Parliament
