= Margaret Aachilla Aleper =

Ugandan politician (born 1963)

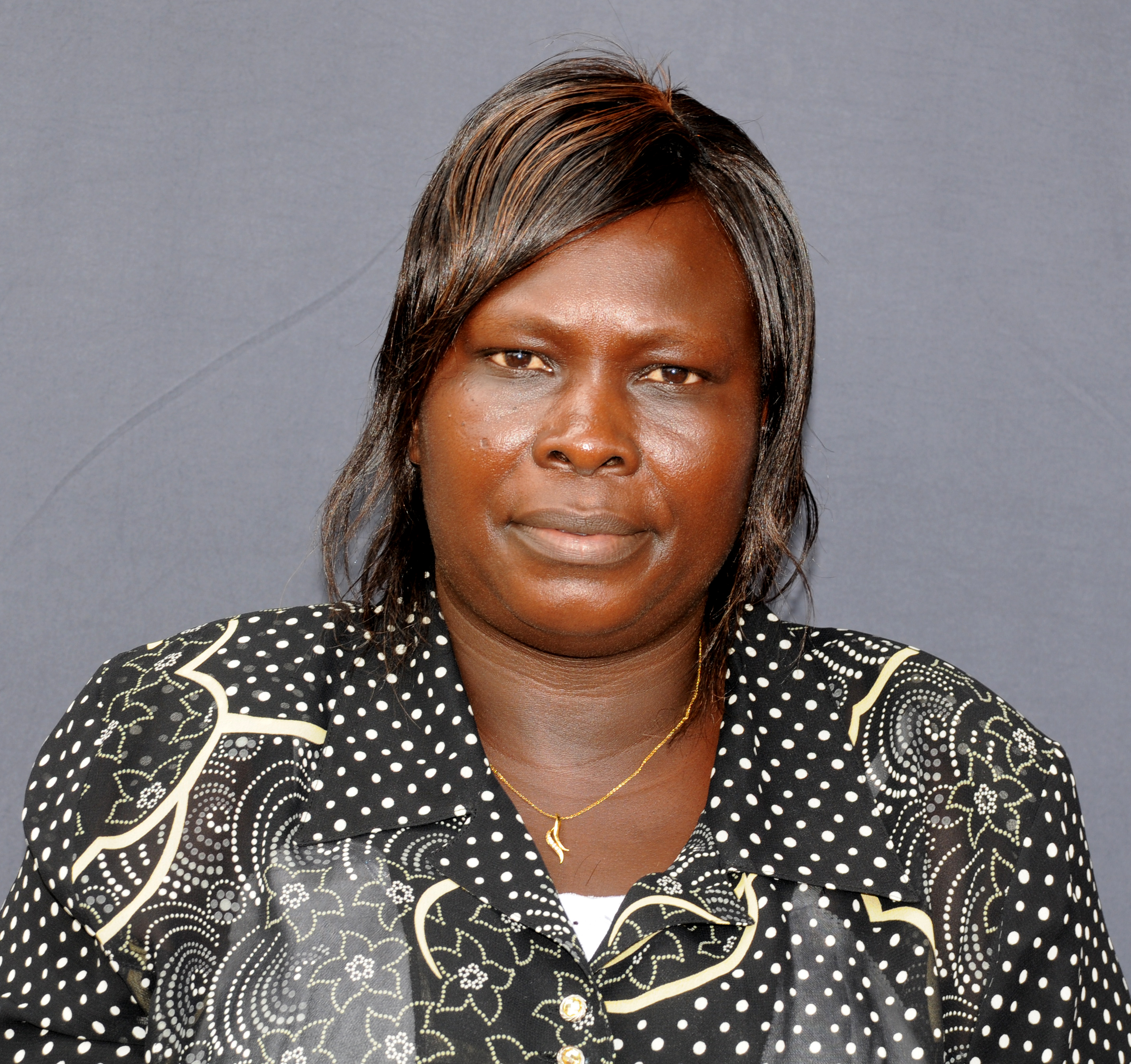
- Born: 22 November 1963 (age 63); Kotido District
- Education: Moroto Teacher Training College; Institute of Teacher Education, Kyambogo; Kyambogo University
- Occupations: politician, Grade III Teacher
- Political party: National Resistance Movement

Margaret Aachilla Aleper (born 22 November 1963) is a Ugandan politician and the district woman representative for Kotido district in Uganda's 10th Parliament. She is a member of the ruling National Resistance Movement party.

== Early life and education ==
Margaret Aleper was born on 22 November 1963. She attended Primary Leaving Examination at Kotido Mixed Primary School in 1976. In 1980, she completed her Uganda Certificate of Education at Kangole Girls Senior Secondary School. She was awarded a certificate in Grade III Teaching at Moroto Teacher Training College/Makerere University in 1985. In 1997, she completed a Diploma in Teacher Education from Institute of Teacher Education, Kyambogo. She attained her bachelor's degree in education from Kyambogo University in 2004.

== Career ==
Her working history is detailed below:

- 2006 to date: member of Parliament, Parliament of Uganda.
- 1997-2006: deputy head teacher, Lomukura Primary School.
- 2001-2006: monitoring assistant, Kotido District Local Government.
- 1985-1996: education assistant, Kotido Mixed and Lomukura Primary School.

== Other responsibilities ==
She also serves as a full-time member under the Membership to Professional bodies at Uganda National Teachers Union.

== Controversies ==
She was tagged among the members of Parliament who betrayed Uganda. She was named one of the members of Parliament who voted "Yes" on the second reading of the Constitution Amendment Bill.

== See also ==
- List of Members of the Ninth Parliament of Uganda
- List of Members of the Tenth Parliament of Uganda
- Kotido District
- Moses Adome
