= Asiimwe Evarlyne Buregyeya =

Ugandan politician

Uganda People's Defence Force Representative
- Incumbent
- Assumed office 2016

Personal details
- Born: August 28, 1975 (age 50) Uganda
- Education: Diploma in Education, National Teachers College Kabale (1996); Bachelor of Education, Ndejje University (2006); Master of Counselling and Psychology, Kampala International University (2011); Diploma in Health Systems Management, Galilee Institute, Israel (2015)
- Alma mater: Nyamwegabira Primary School; Kihihi High School; National Teachers College Kabale; Ndejje University; Kampala International University; Galilee Institute, Israel
- Occupation: Politician, Lt. Colonel, Psychologist
- Known for: Lt. Colonel in the UPDF; Director, UPDF Directorate of HIV & AIDS (appointed 2020); Deputy Director, HIV & AIDS Directorate (2015–2020); UPDF MP supporting constitutional age limit removal (2017)

Asiimwe Evarlyne Buregyeya (born 28 August 1975) is a Ugandan politician, Lt. Colonel and a psychologist. She is also a member of the Parliament of Uganda of the 10th Parliament representing the Uganda People's Defence Force representative.

== Education background ==
She sat for her Primary Leaving Examinations at Nyamwegabira Primary School in 1987. In 1991, she completed her Uganda Certificate of Education from Kihihi High School. She later attained her Uganda Advanced Certificate of Education in 1994. In 1996, she completed her Diploma of Education from National Teachers College, Kabale. She accomplished her Bachelor's Degree in Education from Ndejje University in 2006. In 2011, she returned to the university to complete a Master of Counselling and Psychology at Kampala International University. In 2015, she got a Diploma in Health Systems Management from Galilee Institute, Israel.

== Career and political life ==
In June 2020, she was appointed director of the UPDG directorate of HIV & AIDS. She had previously served as the deputy dictator of the directorate from 2015 to June 2020, and as deputy director of the HIV Prevention programs Coordination between 2012 and 2015. In 2008-2009, she was employed as a member of the Directing staff at the Uganda Military Academy, Kabamba. From 2001-2006, she was a teacher at Bombo Military Secondary School, and from 1997-2000, she also taught at Kihihi High School, Kihihi Teachers' College, and St. Pius Secondary School. From 2016 to date, she is the Member of Parliament at the Parliament of Uganda.

In May 2016, she took the oath at the Parliament of Uganda as the UPDF representative Member of Parliament. She was one of the Members of Parliament who voted yes to the passing of the bill to lift the constitutional age limit of 75 years for presidential candidates.

== Additional role ==
Asiimwe serves in additional roles at the Parliament of Uganda on the committees on HIV/AIDS and related diseases and on Gender, Labour, and Social Development.

== Personal life ==
She is married.

== See also ==
- List of members of the tenth Parliament of Uganda
- Parliament of Uganda
- Uganda People's Defence Force
- Katumba Wamala
