= Florence Namayanja =

Ugandan politician

- Born: 4 October 1960 (age 66); Masaka District
- Citizenship: Ugandan
- Education: Makerere University, Uganda Management Institute
- Occupation: Politician
- Political party: National Unity Platform (NUP)
- Children: 4
- Parents: John Kisomose Mukasa (father); Pirajiya Namatove (mother)

Florence Namayanja (born 4 October 1960) is a female Ugandan politician who was district woman representative of Bukoto County East, Masaka District.

She was affiliated to the Democratic Party political party and now affiliated to National Unity Platform. In the 11th Parliament, she stood as the Candidate for LC5 Chairperson for Masaka City under the National Unity Platform although she lost the elections. She was the winner of Masaka City mayoral seat after defeating seven candidates, including business tycoon Emmanuel Lwasa, with 28,824 votes.

== Background and education ==
Namayanja was born to the late John Kisomose Mukasa and Pirajiya Namatove. She is the fifth born in a family of eight children. In 1978, she attained her Uganda Certificate of Education from Masaka S.S.S. and after joined Makerere Day and Evening Classes for Adults for her Uganda Advanced Certificate of Education and she completed it in 2003. She holds a Certificate in Human Resource Management in Local Governments (2004) and a Certificate in Leadership and Management (2005) from Uganda Management Institute. In 2007, she joined Makerere University for her bachelor's degree in Industrial and Organizational Psychology. In the same year (2007), she was awarded a Certificate in Building Communities of Character from Character Training Institute, Oklahoma.

== Work experience ==
She was the administrator at National Water and Sew.Corp (1981-1994). She later was employed as a member of Council at Mulago School of Nursing (2008-2009) and Kyambogo University Council (2006-2011). In the same year (2006-2011), she served as the board member at National Water & Sewerage Corporation. Additionally, she was the councilor LC5 (2001-2006) and deputy mayor of Kampala City (2006-2011).

== Political experience ==
From 2011 to 2016, Namayanja was the member of parliament of Uganda at the Parliament of Uganda in the ninth and tenth parliament. She served an additional role at the Parliament of Uganda on the Committee on Natural Resources, and Committee on Commissions, State Authorities & State Enterprises.

== Personal life ==
Namayanja is divorced. Her hobbies are exploring new things, and making new friends. She is a Rotarian and a Women Leader (Head of DP Women League).

== Controversy ==
Florence Namayanja and Dr Abed Bwanika, the National Unity Platform presidential candidate, were arrested during protests that followed the arrest of Robert Kyagulanyi Ssentamu. They were arrested together with Evan Kanyike, the Bukoto East NUP parliamentary candidate and Juliet Kakande Nakabuye, Masaka Woman parliamentary candidate. They were charged with inciting violence and doing an act likely to spread infectious diseases, under section 171 of the Penal Code Act. They were later released on bail.

== See also ==
- List of members of the tenth Parliament of Uganda
- List of members of the ninth Parliament of Uganda
