= Kizza =

Kizza is both a given name and a surname. Notable people with the name include:

- Kizza Besigye (born 1956), Ugandan physician
- Betty Kizza (born 1996), Ugandan netball player
- Charles Kizza (born 1974), Ugandan boxer
- Edward Kizza (born 1998), Ugandan footballer
- Izza Kizza (born 1981), American hip hop recording artist
- Mustafa Kizza (born 1999), Ugandan footballer
- Stella Kizza (born 1965), Ugandan accountant
- Harriet Mayanja-Kizza, Ugandan physician
