= Margaret Rwabushaija =

Ugandan politician

Hon. Margaret Rwabushaija

Member of Parliament, Workers Representative
- In office 2016–2021

Personal details
- Born: 12 August 1956 (age 70) Uganda
- Citizenship: Uganda
- Party: Independent
- Spouse: Married
- Education: Makerere University; Uganda Management Institute
- Occupation: Politician, teacher
- Profession: Teacher
- Known for: Representing workers at the national level; Educator and union member
- Committees: Committee on Education and Sports

Margaret Rwabushaija (born 12 August 1956) is a member of the Ugandan Parliament and Workers Representative at the National level and a teacher by profession. She is an Independent politician.

== Educational background ==
In 1969, she completed her Primary Leaving Examinations from Namukozi Primary School and later joined Namasagali College for Uganda Certificate of Education in 1975. In the same year (1975), she completed East African Certificate of Education from Kamuli Parents Secondary School and joined Makerere University to pursue her bachelor's degree in arts in 1979. In the same year (1979), she returned to Makerere University to obtained a Diploma in Education. In 2001, she was awarded a Postgraduate Diploma in Management from Uganda Management Institute. Margaret returned to Uganda Management Institute in 2008 for Masters of Management Studies.

== Career journey ==
Between 2009 - 2015, she served as the Deputy Head Teacher at Kitante Hill School, and Lubiri Secondary School( in 1998 - 2008). She taught at several schools such as Mengo Senior School (1981-1983), City High School(1984 -1997), and Kitante Hill School (1979 -1980).

== Political career ==
From 2016 to 2021, she was the Member of Parliament at the Parliament of Uganda in the 10th parliament.

She served on the Professional Body as the full member at Uganda National Teachers Union, Commonwealth Teachers Group and Forum for East African Teachers Union. She also served on additional role as the Member on Committee on Education and Sports.

== Personal life ==
She is married. Her hobbies are Sports and reading.

== See also ==
- List of members of the tenth Parliament of Uganda
- Parliament of Uganda
- Member of Parliament
