= Kunihira =

Kunihira is a surname. Notable people with the surname include:

- Agnes Kunihira, Ugandan politician
- Faith Kunihira Philo, Ugandan politician
