= Spellanza Baguma Muhenda =

Ugandan politician

Member of Parliament
- Incumbent
- Assumed office 2016
- Constituency: Kyenjojo District Woman Representative

Personal details
- Born: 30 October 1978 (age 47) Uganda
- Party: National Resistance Movement (NRM)
- Education: Kyebambe Girls Secondary School; Makerere University (B.Ed); Law Development Centre, Kampala (Certificate in Law); Uganda Management Institute (Postgraduate Diploma in Public Administration and Management)
- Occupation: Politician
- Committees: Local Government Accounts Committee Committee on Public Service and Local Government

Spellanza Baguma Muhenda (born October 30, 1978) is a member of the Ugandan Parliament. She is the Woman District Representative for Kyenjojo District in the Tooro sub-region in Western Uganda and is affiliated with the National Resistance Movement (NRM).

== Background and education ==
Spellanza Baguma Muhenda was born on 30 October 1978 in a catholic family. She completed her Uganda Certificate of Education at Kyebambe Girls S.S. in 1996. She remained at Kyebambe Girls S.S where she completed her Uganda Advanced Certificate of Education in 1998. She then joined Makerere University in 2002, where she graduated with a Bachelor of Education. She further studied at the Law Development Centre, Kampala, where she graduated with a Certificate in Law (Administrative Officers Law Course) in 2006. In 2008, she got her Postgraduate Diploma in Public Administration and Management from Uganda Management Institute.

== Career ==
From 2000 to 2002, Spellanza Baguma Muhenda was a trainer at Ruwoda. She became the program officer of the youth organization Engabu za Tooro from 2002 - 2003. She was also executive director for Protect the Children Kyenjojo from 2004 to 2006. She became a Councilor for Kyenjojo District Local Government from 2002 to 2006. She was district registrar for the National Resistance Movement in 2006. At Kyenjojo District Local Government from 2006 to 2010, Baguma was a senior assistant secretary. She was also a Senior Assistant Secretary for Kyegegwa District Local Government from 2010 to 2015. She has been a Member of Parliament in the Parliament of Uganda from 2016 to date.

She is also a member of the Local Government Accounts Committee and a member of the committee on public service and local government. She was the vice president of the Parliamentary Health Committee in the 10th parliament of Uganda n a champion on sexual reproductive health issues. She is the current Chairperson of the Network for African Women Ministers and Parliamentarians (NAWMP). She presented a motion demanding that the government implement key policies that would impact the lives of young people. She has always expressed concern about the performance of district health workers. She has always participated in the betterment of education. She participated in the formulation of a private health insurance scheme.

== See also ==
- Parliament of Uganda
- Kyenjojo District
- National Resistance Movement
- List of members of the tenth Parliament of Uganda
