= Nambozo =

Nambozo is a name. Notable people with the name include:

- Beverley Nambozo, Ugandan writer
- Florence Nambozo Wamala (born 1975), Ugandan politician
- Sarah Nambozo Wekomba (born 1978), Ugandan legislator
