= Godfrey Kiwanda =

Ugandan politician (born 1973)

Honourable Godfrey Kiwanda
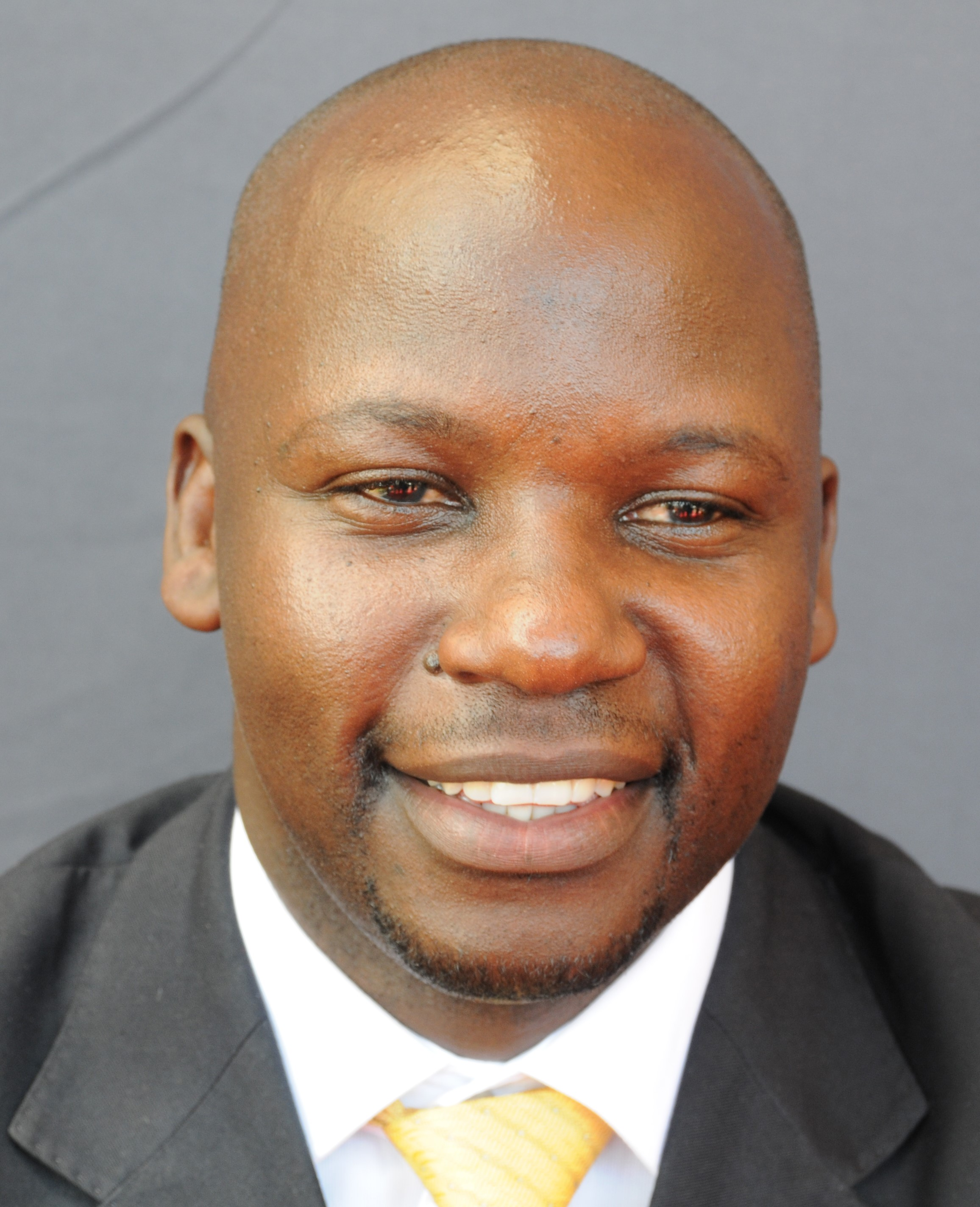
- Kiwanda in 2019
- Born: 1 August 1973 (age 52); Mityana District, Uganda
- Citizenship: Uganda
- Education: St Francis Senior Secondary School, Busunju (Uganda Certificate of Education) (Uganda Advanced Certificate of Education); Makerere University (Bachelor of Arts)
- Occupation: Politician
- Years active: 2003–present
- Known for: Politics
- Title: Member of Parliament for Mityana County North and State Minister for Tourism

Godfrey Ssuubi Kiwanda is a Ugandan politician. He was appointed as the State Minister for Tourism in the Ugandan Cabinet on 6 June 2016. He concurrently served as the elected representative of Mityana County North, Mityana District in the 10th Ugandan Parliament from 2016 to 2021.

== Background and education ==
Kiwanda was born in present-day Mityana District, on 1 August 1973. He attended St. Joseph Busunju Primary School, obtaining the Primary Leaving Certificate in 1989. He transferred to St. Francis Senior Secondary School, Busunju where he completed both middle and high school. He received his High School Diploma in 1996. He continued his studies at Makerere University, Uganda's oldest and largest public university, graduating in 2000 with a Bachelor of Arts degree.

== Career ==
Kiwanda was first elected to Uganda's parliament in 2001, representing Mityana North Constituency, serving in that capacity until 2006. From 2007 until 2010, he served as the Resident District Commissioner (RDC) of Kaabong District, in the Karamoja sub-region.

In 2011, he bounced back into parliament on the National Resistance Movement (NRM) political party ticket. He was re-elected in 2016. In June of that year, he was appointed as State Minister for Tourism in the Cabinet of Uganda.

== Other considerations ==
During the run-up to the 2021 presidential and parliamentary elections, Godfrey Kiwanda withdrew his name from the 2021 parliamentary race in his constituency, just before the NRM party primaries in August 2020. That left Muhamad Kibedi Nsegumire, as the sole NRM representative in the upcoming 14 January 2021 general election.

Kiwanda was elected by the Central Executive Committee (CEC), the supreme organ of the NRM, as the Party's Vice President for the Central Region of Uganda for the term 2021 to 2026.

== See also ==
- Cabinet of Uganda
- Parliament of Uganda
