= Namayanja =

Namayanja is a surname. Notable people with the surname include:

- Florence Namayanja (born 1960), Ugandan politician
- Rose Namayanja (born 1975), Ugandan lawyer and politician
