= Justine Ayebazibwe =

Ugandan politician

Honorable

Personal details
- Born: Justine Ayebazibwe; 23 July 1972 (age 53) Isingiro, Uganda
- Citizenship: Uganda
- Education: Makerere University Business School
- Occupation: HR Manager, politician
- Known for: Human resource management, politics

Justine Ayebazibwe Kashaija also known as Justine Kashaija (born 23 July 1972) is a Ugandan human resource manager, entrepreneurship expert and politician. She was the female MP for Isingiro District and is a representative of NRM, the ruling political party. She succeeded Grace Isingoma Byarugaba who she defeated in the party's primary elections in 2015. In the 10th Parliament, she served as a member of the Committee on Health and the Committee on Commissions, State Authorities & State Enterprises. She was also a member of the NRM Parliamentary Caucus. She lost to Claire Mugumya in the 2021 general election to represent people in the 11th parliament of Uganda.

== See also ==
- Parliament of Uganda
- National Resistance Movement.
- List of members of the tenth Parliament of Uganda.
