= Rose Mutonyi Masaaba =

Ugandan politician

Woman Representative, Bubulo County West, Manafwa District
- Incumbent
- Assumed office 2016

Personal details
- Born: August 20, 1949 (age 76) Uganda
- Party: National Resistance Movement
- Education: Grade II Teacher Certificate (1968); Grade III Teacher Certificate (1974–1979); Diploma in Education; Bachelor of Arts (1986); Master of Education (1997)
- Alma mater: Makerere University
- Occupation: Teacher, Politician
- Known for: Chairperson, Committee on Foreign Affairs; Long-standing career in teaching and educational leadership; Service in Uganda's foreign missions (New Delhi, Dar es Salaam)

Rose Mutonyi Masaaba also known as Rose Mutonyi is a Ugandan teacher, and politician who has been the Manafwa District Bubulo County West woman representative, a position she has held since 2016. She is affiliated with the National Resistance Movement political party.

== Background and education ==
She was born on 20 August 1949. Rose Mutonyi Masaaba attended Nyondo Junior Secondary School for her high school education in 1964.

In 1968, she graduated as a teacher with a Grade II Teacher Certificate. In 1974, Rose graduated as a Grade III teacher with a Grade III Teachers Certificate in 1979. Rose attained a Diploma in Education and later in 1986, she attained a bachelor's degree of Arts and finally in 1997 she graduated with a Master of Education at Makerere University and all these qualifications were consistently obtained at Makerere University in different year intervals.

== Work experience ==
work Experience Tabulated
Title	Institution	Year
Counsellor	Ministry of Foreign Affairs	2003–2010
Principal	Nazigo Teacher Training College	1989–1997
Deputy Principal	Busubizi Teacher Training College	1986–1988
Teacher	Gangama Primary School	1976
Member of Parliament	Parliament of Uganda	2016 to date
Teacher	Nabuyonga Primary School	1974–1975
Teacher	Muyembe Girls Primary School	1971–1972
Teacher	Nyondo Demonstration School	1969–1971

Mutonyi once served as counsel and accounting officer at Uganda's foreign missions in New Delhi and Dar es Salaam. Her political office is at Sibanga Sub County in Sibanga Trading Center.

== Parliamentary duties ==
Besides her duties as a member of the Ugandan Parliament, she sits on the following parliamentary committees:

- Committee on Foreign Affairs as the Chairperson.
- Business Committee, Member.
- Committee on Science and Technology, Member.

== Personal life ==
She is a Catholic by faith.

== See also ==
- Parliament of Uganda
- Member of Parliament
- Manafwa District
- List of members of the tenth Parliament of Uganda
