= Norah Bigirwa-Nyendwoha =

Ugandan politician

Norah Bigirwa
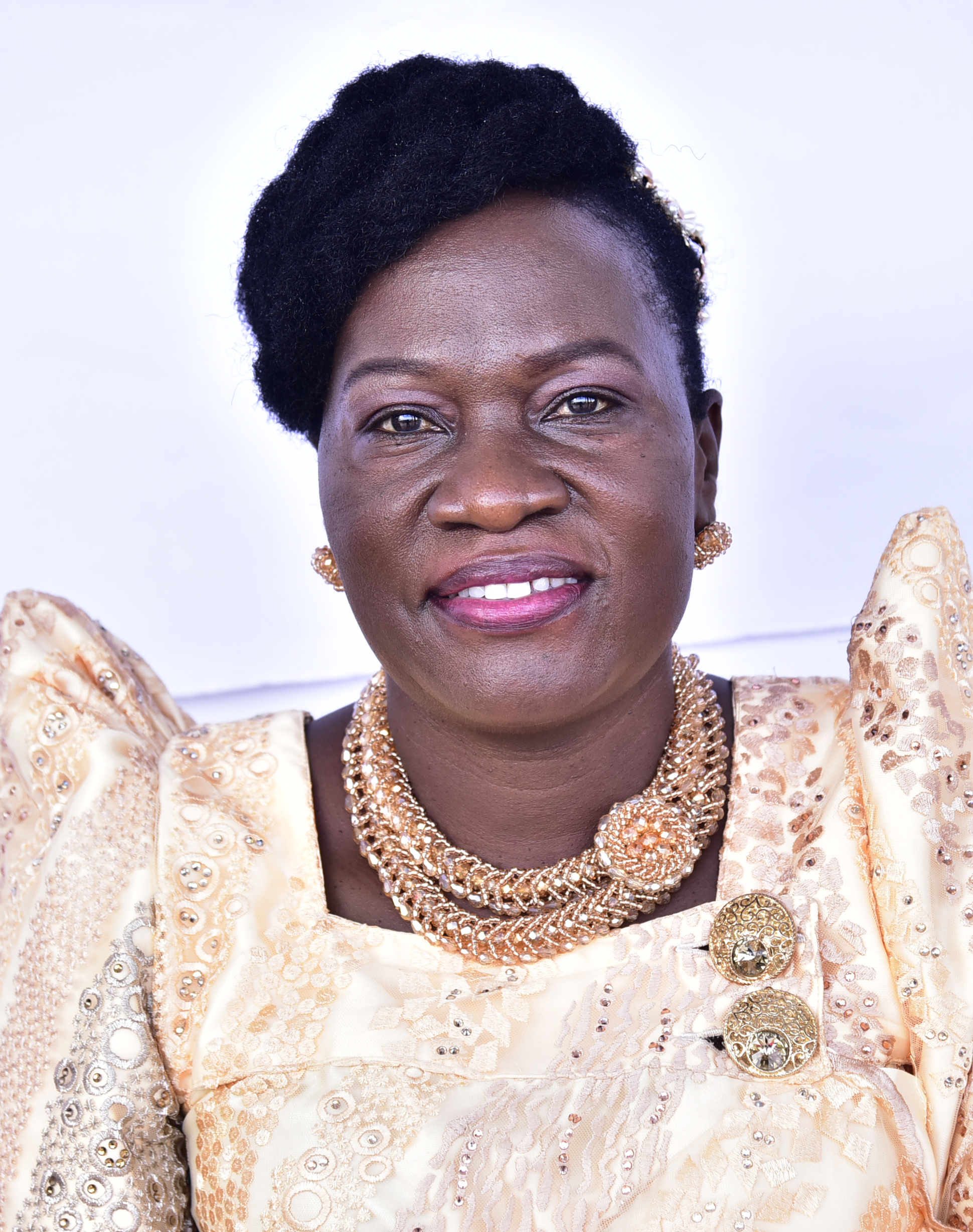
- Born: 19 October 1968 (age 58)
- Citizenship: Ugandan
- Education: National College of Business Studies, Nakawa; Uganda Management Institute; Ndejje University
- Occupation: Politician
- Employers: A&M Executive Cleaning Services; Uganda Wildlife Authority; District Health Services Project, Mukono District
- Title: Member of Parliament

Norah Bigirwa-Nyendwoha (born 19 October 1968) is a Ugandan politician and woman member of parliament. In 2016, she was elected as a woman representative in parliament for Buliisa district. In the 2021 Uganda general elections, she was re-elected for a similar position.

She is a member of the ruling National Resistance Movement party.

In the eleventh parliament, Norah serves on the Committee on Foreign Affairs.

== Early life and education ==
In 1992, Norah completed acquired a diploma in Business Studies at National College of Business Studies located in Nakawa.

In 1995, she acquired an Accounting Technician Certificate from the Uganda Management Institute. The same institute where after 4 years, she got a Finance Officers Diploma.

In 2003, she graduated from Ndejje University with a bachelor's degree of Business Administration in Kampala.

== Other responsibilities ==
Job Title	Organisation	Period Of Work
Assistant Operations Manager	A&M Executive Cleaning Services	2012-2015
Senior Accountant	Uganda Wildlife Authority	2003 - 2010
Accounts Assistant	District Health Services Project, Mukono District	1994-2003

== See also ==
- List of members of the tenth Parliament of Uganda
- List of members of the eleventh Parliament of Uganda
- Member of parliament
- Parliament of Uganda
