= Dorothy Azairwe Nshaija Kabaraitsya =

Ugandan politician

- Born: 15 December 1974 (age 51)
- Citizenship: Ugandan
- Education: Makerere University Business School; Makerere University
- Occupations: Politician and accountant
- Employer(s): Office of the Government Chief Whip, Rwenzori Region; Uganda Women Parliamentary Association; Uganda Finance Trust; Bunyoro Toro Rural Development Company Limited; National Resistance Movement; Parliament of Uganda
- Known for: Politics

Dorothy Azairwe Nshaija Kabaraitsya (born 15 December 1974) is a Ugandan politician of Kamwenge District and an accountant by profession. She is a district woman representative affiliated to the ruling political party of National Resistance Movement in the tenth Parliament of Uganda.

== Education ==
She attained a Uganda Diploma in Business Studies from Makerere University Business School in 1998. In 1998, she completed her Bachelor of Business Administration from Makerere University.

== Career history ==
From 2011 to date, she is employed as the regional whip of Rwenzori Region at the Office of the Government Chief Whip. From 2016 to date, she has been working as the treasurer of Uganda Women Parliamentary Association. Between 2000 and 2004, she worked as the Senior Credit Officer at Uganda Finance Trust. From 2004 to 2009, she was the Credit Officer of Bunyoro Toro Rural Development Company Limited. From 2010 to date, she served as the treasurer of National Resistance Movement. From 2011 to date, she has been the Member of Parliament at the Parliament of Uganda.

She also serves on additional role at the Parliament of Uganda as the Public Accounts Committee.

== See also ==
- List of members of the tenth Parliament of Uganda
- Frank Tumwebaze
- Kamwenge District
- Parliament of Uganda
