= Faith Kunihira Philo =

Ugandan politician

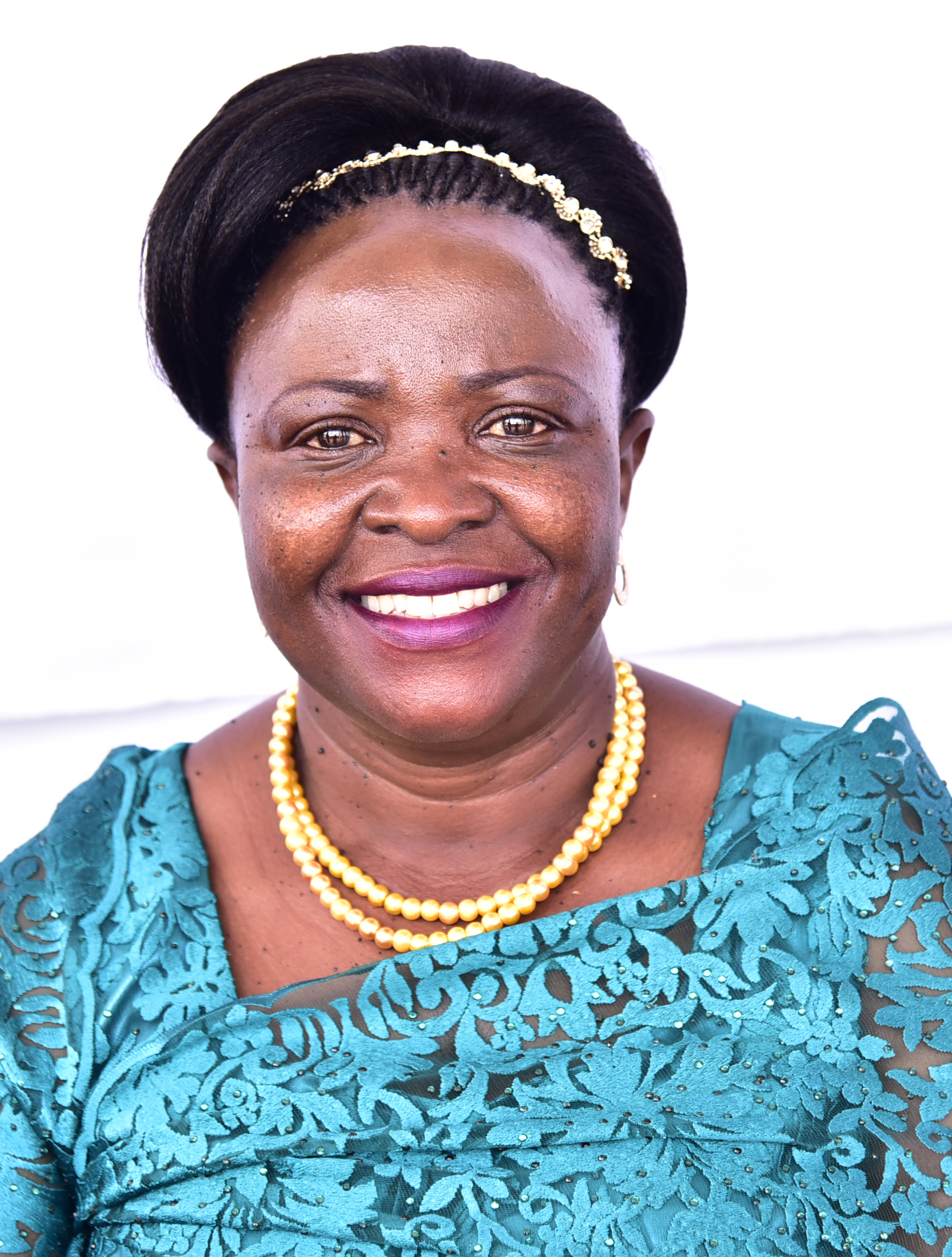
Kunihira Faith Philo

Faith Kunihira Philo, commonly known as Faith Kunihira, is a Female Woman Representative of Kyenjojo district in the Eleventh Parliament of the Republic of Uganda representing the National Resistance Movement (NRM) party.

== Background and education ==
Faith Kunihira was born in Ntutu Village, Nantungo sub county, Kyenjojo district in c.1970. Kunihira studied at Kaihura Primary School in Kyenjojo for her primary education and Madox Secondary School for her secondary education. Kunihira holds a bachelor's degree in business studies from the Institute of Computer Management in the UK. She also holds a master's degree in business administration from Roehampton University, UK. Faith Kunihira was honored a Doctorate in Humanities from Lead Impact University in the USA.

== Career ==
Faith Kunihira is the woman representative of parliament for Kyenjojo District in the Eleventh Parliament of Uganda. Faith Kunihira serves on the Committee on Presidential Affairs in the Eleventh Parliament of Uganda. Faith Kunihira an NRM candidate defeated Baguma Spellanza Muhenda an Independent candidate, Kemigisa Rose a Forum for Democratic Change Candidate and Timbigamba Lyndah another independent candidate for the Women Member of Parliament Seat in Kyenjojo district. Kunihira is the Founder and Executive Director of Bringing Hope Family, Uganda as of March 2023. Kunihira also founded the Masterseed Primary School in Jinja, Uganda. Kunihira Faith worked as an accountant with Shell Jinja before joining Uganda Grain Milling Company as an Audit Assistant before joining the Source Café as a director where she later left to join politics.

== Controversy ==
In may 2024, a petition was filed challenging the election victory of Faith Kunihira Philo at the Fortportal court and was dismissed with costs, a decision that secured her Member of Parliarment seat as the representative and elected member of parliament.

== See also ==
- Parliament of Uganda
- Kyenjojo District
- Thomas Tayebwa
- Anita Among
- Christine Akello
