= Jack Odur Lutanywa =

Ugandan politician

- Citizenship: Ugandan
- Occupation: Member of parliament
- Employer: Parliament of Uganda
- Successor: Karubanga Jacob Atenyi
- Political party: National Resistance Movement

Jack Odur Lutanywa is a Ugandan politician who Served as Member of Parliament of Kibanda South County in Kiryandong District in The Tenth Parliament of Uganda. Representing the National Resistance Movement, the party in power. He lost to Karubanga Jacob Atenyi in the 2021 Parliamentary Elections of Kibanda South constituency.

In 2020 Jack Odur Lutanywa tabled before Parliament a Constitutional Amendment Bill seeking the recognition of the Maragoli as one of the indigenous tribes in Uganda.

== Political career ==
Lutanywa was elected MP for Kibanda South County in Kiryandongo District and served in the tenth Parliament of Uganda (2016-2021) representing the National Resistance Movement (NRM).

As MP, he participatesd in parliamentary business, including debates, and bills forexample in the Ugandan Parliament's discussions on mobile money regulations and transaction limits. He supported the motion opposing changes while emphasizing broader applicability to all Ugandans.

== Constitutional amendment initiative ==
In 2020 and early 2021, Lutanywa tabled a Private Member's Bill in Parliament seeking to amend the 1995 Constitution of Uganda to officially recognise the Maragoli community (a group of people of Kenyan origin residing in parts of Western Uganda) as indigenous community in Uganda. The proposal aimed to add the Maragoli to the third schedule of the Constitution to enable them full access to citizenship rights and services.

== 2021 elections and aftermath ==
Lutanywa stood for re-elections in 2021 Uganda general elections, but he lost his seat to Jacob Karubanga Atenyi (Independent candidate) in Kibanda South.

== See also ==
- Parliament of Uganda
- Judith Babirye
- National Resistance Movement
- List of members of the tenth Parliament of Uganda
