= Benna Namugwanya =

Ugandan politician

- Born: 21 September 1967 (age 58); Uganda
- Citizenship: Uganda
- Education: Makerere University (Bachelor of Education) (Master of Education); Uganda Management Institute (Diploma in Human Resource Management); Law Development Centre (Certificate in Administrative Law)
- Occupations: Educator, politician
- Years active: 1992 – present
- Known for: Politics
- Title: State Minister for Kampala Capital City Authority in the Cabinet of Uganda
- Spouse: Mr. Bugembe

Benna Namugwanya Bugembe (née Benna Namugwanya, born 21 September 1967) is a Ugandan politician. She is a former State minister for Kampala City in the Ugandan Cabinet. She was appointed to that position on 6 June 2016. She served as the Mubende District Woman Representative in the 10th Parliament (2016–2021).

In 2020, she lost the National Resistance Movement (NRM) primary elections to Hope Grania Nakazibwe, and Namugwanya contested as an independent candidate for the seat in the January 2021 general elections but lost it. The Mumbende District Woman MP seat was won by Hope Grania Nakazibwe, who served as the woman representative for Mubende district in the 11th parliament (2021-2026).

== Early life and educationva ==
Benna was born on 21 September 1967, in modern-day Mubende District. She attended Saint Edwards College, in Bukuumi, in modern-day Kakumiro District, for her O-Level studies. She transferred to Saint Kizito High School Bethany, in Ngugulo, in modern-day Mityana District, for her A-Level education. In 1989, she was admitted to Makerere University, in Kampala, the largest city and capital of Uganda. She graduated in 1992 with a Bachelor of Education. Later in 2006, the same University awarded her a Master of Education. Benna Namugwaya also holds a Diploma in Human Resource Management, obtained from the Uganda Management Institute in 2007 and a Certificate in Administrative Law, awarded by the Law Development Centre in 2009.

== Career ==
Her first job was as a teacher at Alliance High School, serving in that capacity until 1995. Shen transferred to Saint Augustine College, in Wakiso, teaching there from 1996 until 1998.

In 1998, Benna Namugwanya was hired by Mubende District Local Government, as an Inspector of Schools, serving in that capacity for six years. In 2004, she was promoted to the position of Assistant District Education Officer, in Mubende District, serving in that capacity for one year. In 2005, she was again promoted to Acting District Education Officer, serving for two years in that position. She became the District Education Officer in 2007, serving in that capacity until 2010.

In 2011 she entered Ugandan elective politics, by contesting the Mubende District Women's Constituenc, under the ruling National Resistance Movement political party ticket. She won and was re-elected in 2016. In the cabinet list, released on 6 June 2016, Namugwanya was named the Minister of State for Kampala City Affairs, deputizing Beti Olive Namisango Kamya-Turomwe, the full cabinet minister.

== See also ==
- Cabinet of Uganda
- Parliament of Uganda
- Kampala Capital City Authority
