= Mourine Osoru =

Ugandan Legislator

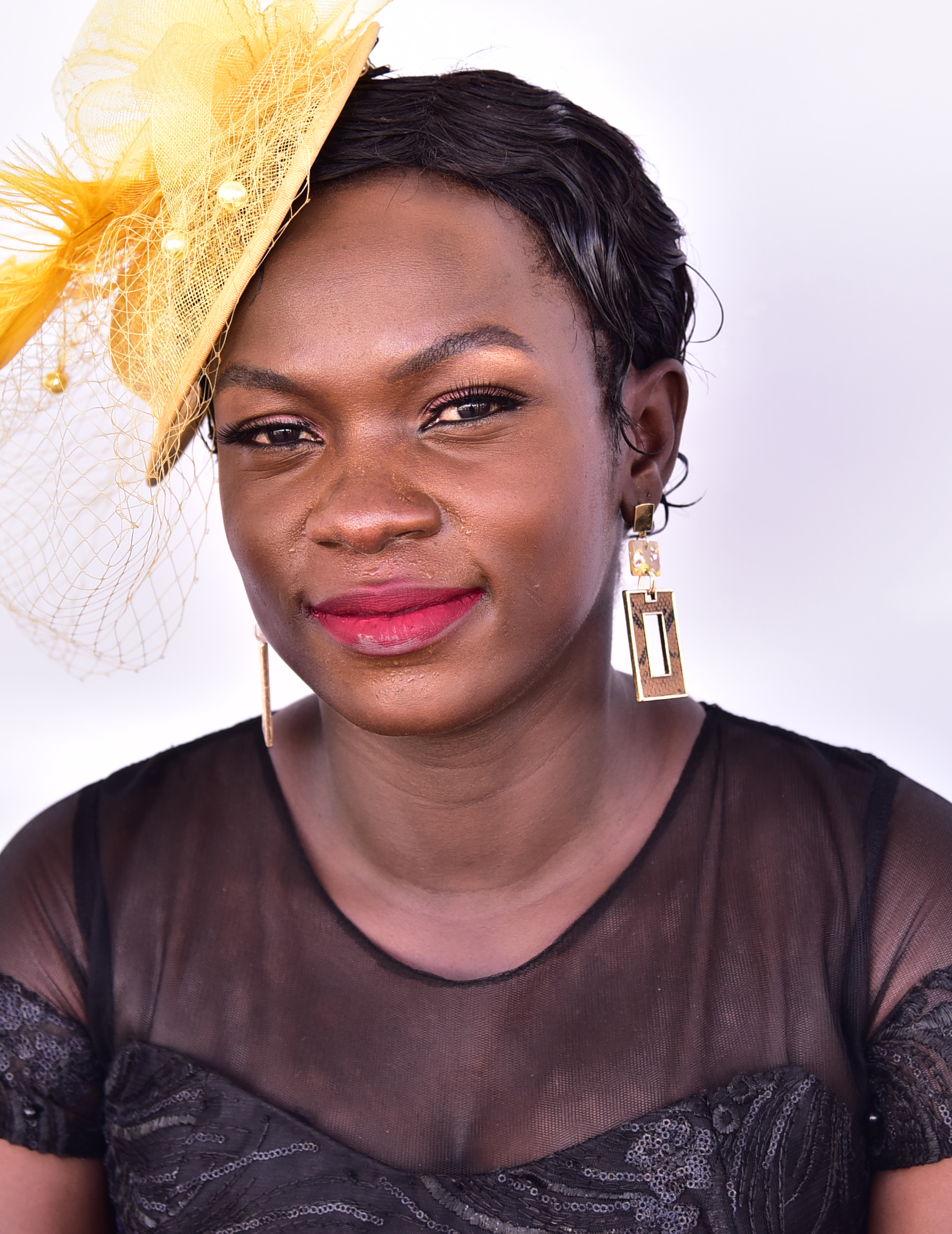

Woman Representative for Arua City
- Incumbent
- Assumed office 2016

Personal details
- Born: November 3, 1989 (age 36) Arua, Uganda
- Party: National Resistance Movement (NRM)
- Education: Degree in Accounting and Finance, University of East London (2014)
- Alma mater: St. Jude Nursery & Primary School / Kirinya Parents Primary School; Kisubi High School; Forest Hill College, Mukono; University of East London
- Occupation: Accountant, Politician
- Known for: Member of Parliament for Arua City (10th & 11th Parliament); President, Forum of Young Parliamentarians of the Inter-Parliamentary Union (IPU) (2017); Service on Parliamentary Committees: Human Rights; Gender, Labour and Social Development

Mourine Osoru (born 3 November 1989) is a Ugandan accountant and legislator who as of February 2022 serves as the elected woman representative for Arua City in Uganda's eleventh parliament. She held the same position in Uganda's tenth parliament Politically, she is affiliated to the affiliated to the National Resistance Movement under whose ticket she contested in the 2016 general election, achieving victory over Christine Bako Abia.

== Background and education ==
Osoru was born in Arua on 3 November 1989 to Sabua Ajio and Loyce Adiru. Osoru has a degree in Accounting and Finance obtained from the University of East London in 2014. Prior to that she attended Kisubi High School for her O Levels (2004–2008) and Forest Hill College, Mukono for her A Levels (2009–2010). Some sources list her as having attended primary school at St. Jude Nursery and Primary School while others show Kirinya Parents Primary School.

== Career ==
Prior to becoming a legislator in 2016, Osoru was an accountant in 2010 then Assistant Supervisor at Ajio Sabua Enterprises ( 2014–2015).

In Uganda's 10th Parliament, she is a member of the Committees on Human rights as well as Gender, Labour and Social Development.

In 2017, Osoru was elected President of the Forum of Young Parliamentarians of the Inter Parliamentary Union (IPU).

Osoru was kidnapped in 2016.

== See also ==
- List of members of the tenth Parliament of Uganda
