= Annie Logiel =

Ugandan politician

- Born: March 27, 1968; Moroto District
- Died: February 14, 2017 (aged 48)
- Burial place: Nakapelimen village, Nadunget Sub County in Moroto District
- Education: Lotome Girls Primary School; Kangole Girls Secondary School
- Alma mater: Kampala International University; Nsambya Nursing Training School and Health Administration and Management; University of Copenhagen,
- Occupations: politician, legislator and trained nurse
- Political party: National Resistance Movement
- Spouse: Eric Joe Logiel
- Children: 2

Annie Logiel (born March 27, 1968) was a female Ugandan politician, a trained nurse, founder of Karamoja Traditional Healers Association, and district woman representative of Moroto in the 10th Parliament of Uganda under the National Resistance Movement political party. She was elected in 2016 and passed on in 2017. She died at the age of 48 at the Rigshospitalet in Copenhagen in Denmark where she was taken for an operation to remove a tumour on her brain. It was reported by her family that she went through the brain tumour operation but later developed complications leading to her death.

== Education ==
She went to Kangole Girls for her secondary education which she completed in 1986 and Lotome Girls Primary School for the Primary Leaving Examination (PLE) in 1982. She holds a Bachelor of Nursing from Kampala International University, obtained in 2014. She also holds two diplomas in Nursing and Midwifery from Nsambya Nursing Training School and Health Administration and Management. She also obtained a master's degree in International Health from the University of Copenhagen, Denmark.

== Political history ==
Logiel was for her first-term as the legislator in the 10th parliament. Before joining Parliament, Logiel was the executive director for Karamoja Indigenous and Modern Health project from 2008 to 2016. She also served as a Senior Nursing Officer at Moroto Regional Referral Hospital between 2006 and 2008. She was the vice chairperson of parliament's health committee and a member of the HIV/Aids committee in parliament.

== Personal life ==
She left two children behind (a boy and a girl). She was married to Eric Joe Logiel. Museveni pledged to meet the education needs of Logiel's children.

At the time of her death, Logiel was supporting about 101 to 106 students in her community through a bursary scheme she established in Moroto. Among these are; her two biological children, 12 relatives and 87 community members who were at different levels of education. Of these, eight were pursuing degree programmes, 20 were on diploma courses, 16 studying for certificates. There were also 10 students at A-level, 41 at O-level, four in primary schools and one at nursery level.

== Burial ==
Annie was laid to rest at her ancestral home at Nakapelimen village, Nadunget Sub County in Moroto district along Moroto-Soroti road on Sunday.

== See also ==
- List of members of the tenth Parliament of Uganda
- Parliament of Uganda
