= Sam Byibesho =

Ugandan politician (born 1964)

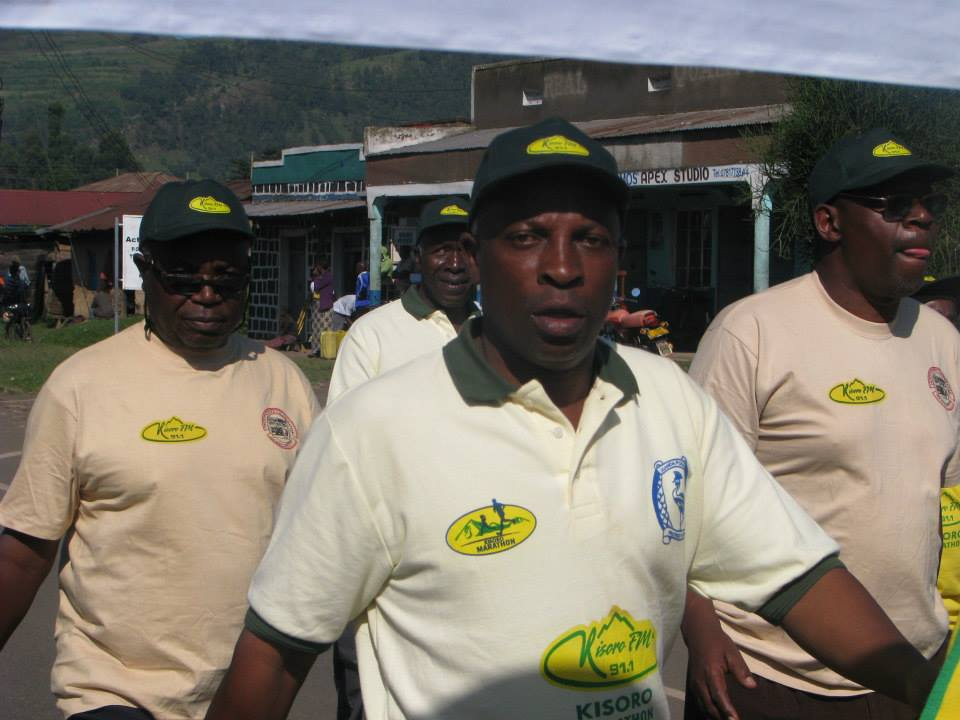
- Byibesho in 2013

Honorable

Personal details
- Born: Sam Byibesho; 25 April 1964 (age 62) Kisoro, Uganda
- Other political affiliations: National Resistance Movement (Uganda)
- Education: Kyambogo University (Diploma in Education); Uganda Martyrs University (Bachelor of Education)
- Occupation: Teacher, Politician
- Known for: Teaching, Politics

Sam Byibesho (born 25 April 1964) is a Ugandan politician who serves as a member of Parliament of Uganda for Kisoro Municipality. He is a member of the ruling party, the National Resistance Movement (NRM).

From 2002 to 2016, Byibesho served as mayor of the Kisoro Town Council. Currently, he represents the NRM as its chairman for the Kisoro Municipality constituency. Byibesho serves on several committees, including the Local Government Accounts Committee, the Committee on Public Service and Local Government, and the NRM Parliamentary Caucus Committee in the Parliament of Uganda.

Byibesho previously worked in the education sector as a third-grade teacher from 1991 to 1996. He later served as the head teacher at Mubuga Primary School.

== Early life and education ==
Byibesho was born on the 25th of April 1964 in the municipality of Kisoro in the Kigezi sub-region in Uganda. His family is a part of the Bafumbira ethnic group and practice the Anglican faith. He is the firstborn child of Obed Byibesho, a clergyman, and Aidah Byibesho, a farmer. He has two sisters and two brothers.

He attended Seseme Primary School, St. Paul's Senior Secondary School Mutorere, and City High School in the capital city, Kampala, for his O-Level education. He completed his schooling with a Uganda Certificate of Education (UCE) in 1984.

In 1991, he obtained a third-grade certificate from Kisoro Primary Teachers' College (PTC). He attended Kyambogo University, where he earned a diploma in Education in 2004. He later studied at Uganda Martyrs University in Nkozi, Uganda, where he was a coordinator for the Kisoro Students Association. He graduated with a Bachelor of Education in 2009.

== Career and politics ==
Byibesho began his professional career as a third-grade primary school teacher at Seseme Primary School from 1991 to 1996, after obtaining his teaching certificate. In 1997, he was promoted to head teacher at Mubuga Primary School, serving until 2002, when he resigned to serve as Local council (LC III) chairman for Kisoro Town Council, as the law prohibits teaching and serving in the local council simultaneously.

However, Byibesho's political career began earlier. He was the chairperson for the Resistance Council (RC II) in Karumena village from 1988 to 1992. He was then elected RC II chairperson for Kisoro Central Parish and simultaneously served as a councillor for Kisoro Town Council from 1992 to 1996. In 1997, when RCs were renamed LC IIIs (LCs), he continued to serve as an LC II Chairman for the North Ward Parish, Kisoro Town Council, until 2002, when he became the LC III Chairman. He remained in that position for 14 years, until 2016.

During his tenure as LC III chairman, Byibesho sought election as a Member of Parliament with the NRM party. He won the party's 2015 primary elections and the 2016 general elections, becoming MP for Kisoro Municipality.

He has served on several school boards. Byibesho was chairman of finance on the boards of Seseme Girls Secondary School (2002–2012), Kisoro PTC (2004–2015), Kisoro Technical Institute (2004–2010), and Kisoro Vision High School (2008–present). He was a member of the School Management Committee (SMC) for Seseme Primary School from 2008 to 2015.
