= Grace Kaudha =

Ugandan politician

- Hailat Magumba
- Born: 14 October 1986
- Died: 1 July 2017 (aged 30); Mulago National Referral Hospital
- Cause of death: Pregnancy complications
- Resting place: Magogo village, Nawaningi sub-county in Iganga district
- Occupations: legislator and Politician
- Predecessor: Kabaale Kwagala Olivia
- Political party: National Resistance Movement (NRM)
- Spouse: Ibrahim Tooto
- Children: One

Grace Kaudha, also known as Grace Hailat Kaudha Magumba, (14 October 1986 – 1 July 2017) was a Ugandan politician and a legislator who was the Women's Representative for Iganga district in the 10th parliament of Uganda in 2016. She was affiliated with the National Resistance Movement.

She died at Mulago National Referral Hospital from pregnancy complications.

== Career ==
She was the Women's Representative of Iganga district who replaced Kabaale Kwagala Olivia, and she served on the Committee on Rules, Discipline and Privileges and the Committee on Gender, Labour and Social Development.

== Personal life ==
She was a wife to Ibrahim Tooto and a mother to one child.

== Death ==
When Kauda went into labor, she sought medical attention at a private hospital. However, the hospital's only doctor was not available to see her, and she was forced to go to a different hospital, also under-staffed. She died at Mulago National Referral Hospital in Kawempe on Saturday 1 July 2017 at 2:00 o'clock. Her death is said to have been caused by a condition called pre-eclampsia caused by pregnancy complications, and would have been preventable if she had access to better healthcare. She was laid to rest in Magogo village, Nawaningi sub-county in Iganga district.

== See also ==
- List of members of the tenth Parliament of Uganda
- Parliament of Uganda
- National Resistance Movement
