= Angelline Osegge =

Ugandan politician

- Born: 12 August 1969 (age 57); Soroti
- Education: Makerere University (Bachelor of Arts in Social Science); Uganda Martyrs University (Diploma in Microfinance)
- Occupations: Social worker, politician
- Years active: 1995–present
- Title: Member of Parliament for Soroti District Women's Constituency
- Political party: Forum for Democratic Change
- Spouse: Mr. Osegge

Angelline Asio Osegge, also known as Angelina Osege (born 8 December 1969), is a Ugandan social worker and politician, who serves as the incumbent Member of Parliament representing the Soroti District Women Constituency in the 10th Ugandan Parliament (2016 to 2021). She is the chairperson of the Public Accounts Committee for the Central Government. She belongs to Forum for Democratic Change (FDC).

== Early life and education ==
Osegge was born Angelline Asio, on 12 August 1969, in Soroti District, in the Eastern Region of Uganda. She attended local schools for her pre-university education. In 1991, she was admitted to Makerere University, Uganda's oldest and largest public university, graduating in 1994 with a Bachelor of Arts degree in Social Science. In 2007, she entered the Uganda Martyrs University, graduating in 2009, with a Diploma in Microfinance. She is married.

== Work experience ==
Prior to joining full-time politics, she worked as a community development employee for World Vision International and later, as credit officer at Pride Microfinance Limited, a government-owned microfinance bank serving the lower segments of society, who are not served or are unable to access financial services through Ugandan commercial banks. While there, she rose to the rank of branch manager. From 2006 until 2008, she was the executive director of Local Enterprise Assistance Programme, a Ugandan non-profit organization.

== Political career ==
Osegge was first elected to the Ugandan parliament in 2011, on the opposition Forum for Democratic Change (FDC) political party. In 2016, she retained her seat in parliament. While in parliament, she serves as the chairperson of the parliamentary committee on Public Accounts. Since September 2016, she is deputy chairperson of the African Organisation of Public Accounts Committees (AFROPAC).

== Controversy ==
Osege is an active and vocal member of the opposition in parliament. In August 2013, she was suspended for three days by the deputy speaker Jacob Oulanyah, for "shouting the most", during the passing of the Public Order Management Bill.

In September 2017, during the introduction of the constitutional amendment to the presidential age limit, Osege was injured during fighting that broke out in the parliamentary chamber. She was hospitalized as a result of her injuries.

== See also ==
- List of members of the ninth Parliament of Uganda
- List of members of the tenth Parliament of Uganda
