= Christine Ayo Achen =

Ugandan politician and administrator

Woman Member of Parliament for Alebtong District
- In office 2016–2021

Personal details
- Born: July 7, 1983 (age 42) Uganda
- Party: National Resistance Movement (NRM)
- Education: Diploma in Development Studies, Nzamizi Training Institute
- Occupation: Politician, Administrator
- Known for: Woman MP for Alebtong District (10th Parliament); Member, Committee on Gender, Labour and Social Development; Member, Public Accounts Committee – Local Government (PAC‑LG); Voted to remove presidential age limits in 2017

Christine Ayo Achen also known as Achen Christine Ayo (born 7 July 1983) is a Ugandan politician and administrator. She is the district woman representative of Alebtong in the 10th parliament of Uganda. She is affiliated with the National Resistance Movement.

== Education ==
Christine holds a diploma in development studies from the Nzamizi Training Institute in social development.

== Career history ==
She has been a Member of Parliament of the Parliament of Uganda since 2016. She serves on additional role as the member of the committee on Gender Labour and Social Development and PAC local government at the Parliament of Uganda. Ahead of 2021 general elections, she faced challenger Barbra Akech.

She was among MPs who voted to remove age limits in 2017.

== Personal life ==
She is married. She is an Anglican by faith.

== See also ==
- List of members of the tenth Parliament of Uganda
- Parliament of Uganda
- Alebtong District
- National Resistance Movement
