= Milly Mugeni =

Ugandan Politician and Former Member of Parliament

Woman Member of Parliament for Butaleja District

Personal details
- Born: Milly Mugeni Uganda
- Occupation: Politician
- Known for: Legislator

Milly Mugeni is a Ugandan politician and legislator. She is the former Woman Member of Parliament for Butaleja District in the Tenth Parliament on the National Resistance Movement (NRM) ticket.

In 2021, she was a member of the Uganda Women Parliamentary Association (UWOPA).

== See also ==
- List of Members of the Tenth Parliament of Uganda
- National Resistance Movement
- Parliament of Uganda
- Butaleja District
