= Abraham Byandala =

Ugandan engineer and politician

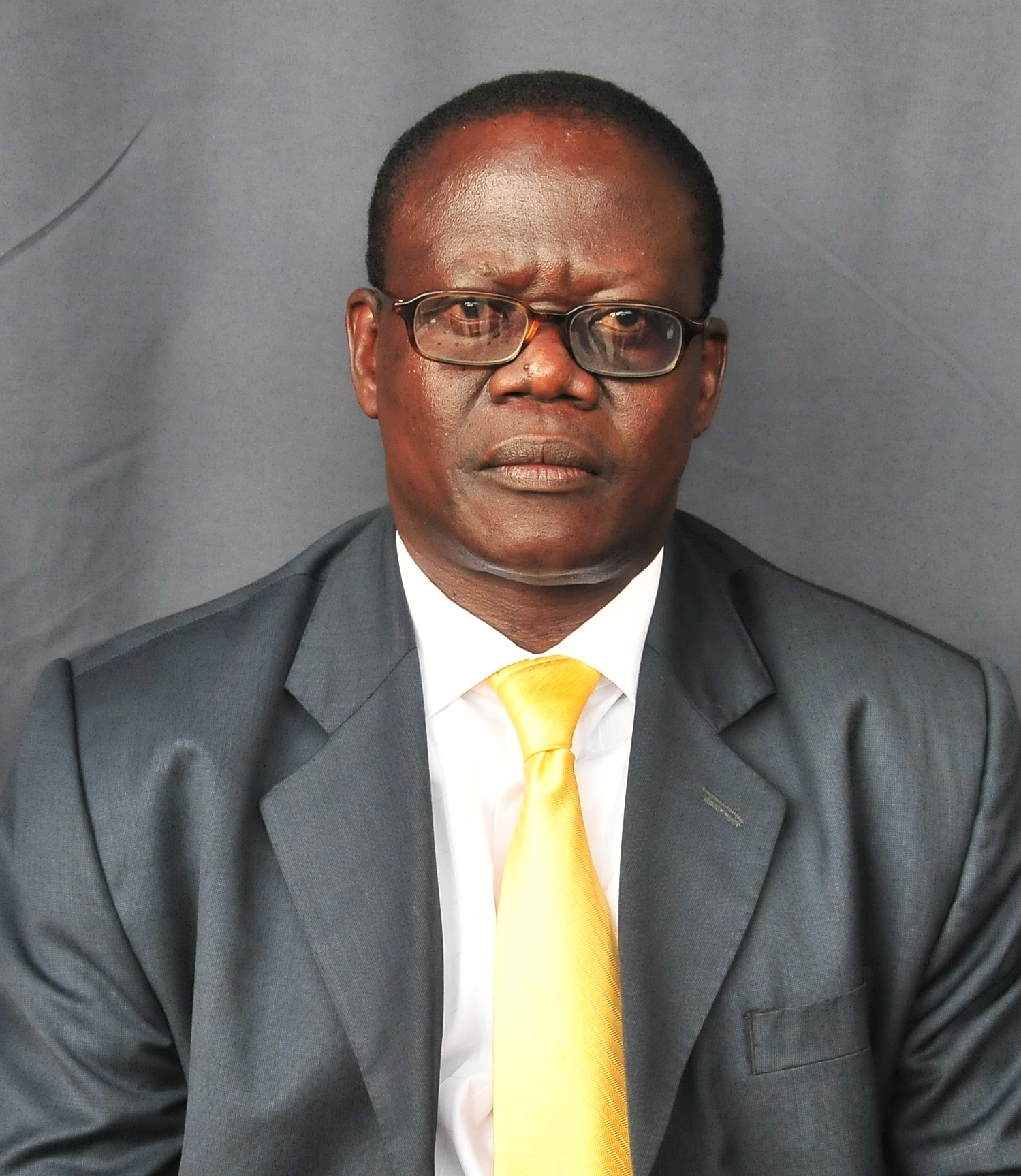
- Born: 14 January 1950 (age 76); Uganda
- Citizenship: Uganda
- Education: Makerere University (Bachelor of Science in Civil Engineering); Strathclyde University (Master of Science in Civil Engineering)
- Occupations: Engineer and politician
- Years active: 1971–present

Abraham James Byandala (born 14 January 1950) is a Ugandan engineer and politician. He is the former Minister for Works and Transportation in the Ugandan Cabinet. He was appointed to that position on 27 May 2011. He replaced John Nasasira, who was appointed Government Chief Whip. Byandala also served as the elected Member of Parliament for Katikamu County North, in Luweero District in the 10th parliament of Uganda (2016 to 2021).

== Early life and education ==
Abraham Byandala was born in Luweero District on 14 January 1950. He holds the degree of Bachelor of Science in Civil Engineering (BSc.Civ.Eng.), obtained from Makerere University, the oldest and largest public university in Uganda. His degree of Master of Science in Civil Engineering (MSc.Civ.Eng.), was obtained from the University of Strathclyde, in Glasgow, Scotland.

== Career ==
His work history spans over 40 years in Uganda's road transport. Prior to his appointment as Minister of Transport and Works, he served as the Kampala City Engineer and Surveyor. At one time he served as the chairman of the government's Committee on Physical Infrastructure. In 2016, Byandala contested for Member of Parliament, representing Katikamu County North, Luweero District under National Resistance Movement ticket and won, his term was from 2016 to 2021.

== See also ==
- Cabinet of Uganda
- Parliament of Uganda
- Kampala Capital City Authority
