= Julie Mukoda Zabwe =

Ugandan politician

Mayuge District Woman Representative
- Incumbent
- Assumed office 2016

Personal details
- Born: January 2, 1984 (age 42) Uganda
- Education: Bachelor of Computer Science, Makerere University (2005); Master of Public Administration, Uganda Management Institute (2016–2018)
- Alma mater: Makerere University; Uganda Management Institute
- Occupation: ICT Expert, Politician
- Known for: ICT expertise; Member of multiple parliamentary committees; CEO, MUK Group of Companies (2022–present); Director, United Helping Hands for Uganda (2007–present)

Julie Mukoda Zabwe is a Ugandan ICT Expert and politician who has also been the Mayuge District woman representative, a position she has held since 2016.

== Background and education ==
She was born on 2 January 1984. Julie Mukoda attended Mengo Senior School and Mbogo High School for O-level in 1998 and A-level in 2000, respectively, for her high school education. She studied Computer Science at Makerere University, graduating with a Bachelor of Computer Science in 2005. She went on to obtain a Master of Public Administration from Uganda Management Institute in Kampala in 2016–2018. In 2014.

== Work experience ==
Between 2007 and 2008 she worked as an Academic Registrar at Bethel Training Institute, Assistant Systems Administrator at TASO, Jinja in 2002–2004, Network Administrator at MXN Technologies in 2006–2007 she is the Director at United Helping Hands for Uganda from 2007 to date, She also worked as Network Administrator in Civil Aviation Authority from 2009 to 2011 and Patron at Core Foundation from 2012 to date, She's the CEO of MUK Group of Companies from 2022- date she is also Mayuge District woman representative a position she has held since 2016 to date.

Following the February 2016 general election, Julie Mukoda was unanimously elected as Mayuge District woman representative on 2016.

== Parliamentary duties ==
Besides her duties as a Woman District Representative in the Ugandan Parliament, she sits on the following parliamentary committees:

- The Parliamentary Commission – She was a member
- COMMITTEE ON PUBLIC SERVICE AND LOCAL GOVERNMENT – Member
- COMMITTEE ON PUBLIC ACCOUNTS - Member
- COMMITTEE ON HUMAN RIGHTS FOR PARLIAMENTARIANS(IPU) - VICE CHAIRPERSON
- COMMITTEE ON FINANCE - Member
