= Sarah Nambozo Wekomba =

Ugandan legislator and social worker

Sarah Nambozo Wekomba (born 15 July 1978) is a Ugandan legislator and social worker. As of May 2020, she serves as the elected woman representative for Bulambuli District Uganda's tenth parliament. Politically, she contested as an independent candidate in the 2016 general election, achieving victory over Irene Muloni.

== Background and education ==
Wekomba attended Nkoyoyo Boarding Primary School which she left in 1992 to join Tororo Girls School for both her O and A Levels between 1993 and 1998. She later joined Makerere University and graduated with a bachelor's degree in development studies in 2006.

== Career ==
Prior to becoming a legislator, Wekomba is listed as having been a director at Mbale Importers and Exporters Limited between 2011 and 2016 Between 2006 and 2009 she served as a Customer Care Advisor at Nile Bank (2006 -2007) then at Barclays Bank (2007–2009). She also worked as a cashier and sales assistant at Mt.Elgon Millers Limited from 2005 to 2006.

In the tenth parliament of Uganda, she is a member of both the Local Government Accounts Committee as well as the Committee on Gender, Labour and Social Development.

== See also ==
- Bulambuli District
- Irene Muloni
- List of members of the tenth Parliament of Uganda
- Parliament of Uganda
