= Parish Development Model =

Ugandan government initiative

The Parish Development Model (PDM) is a government-led initiative in Uganda aimed at transforming subsistence households into the money economy and lifting 17.5 million Ugandans in 3.5 million households out of poverty. The PDM initiative was launched on 26 February 2022 in the eastern district of Kibuku. by the President of Uganda Yoweri Museveni. It was a strategy to improve service delivery and alleviate poverty at the grassroots level.

== Overview ==
The PDM is an integrated approach that involves mobilization of communities and empowering them to take charge of their own development by working together to identify and prioritize their needs. The PDM was anchored on the concept of the parish as the smallest unit of government administration and service delivery in Uganda. Each parish develops a Parish Development Plan (PDP) that outlines the key development priorities and strategies for achieving them. The PDP is then developed through a consultative process involving all stakeholders in the parish, including local government officials, community leaders, and members. The PDM was designed to provide a holistic approach to development that addresses the social, economic, and environmental aspects of poverty in Uganda. It was designed to improve access to basic services; health, education, water, and sanitation, promoting economic opportunities and environmental sustainability.

Pillars of the Parish Development Model

The Parish Development Model is based on seven fundamental pillars:

1. Production, Storage, Processing and Marketing
2. Infrastructure and Economic Services
3. Financial Inclusion
4. Social Services
5. Mindset change
6. Parish-Based Management and Information System
7. Governance and Administration.

== Implementation ==
The PDM has always been implemented through a multi-sectoral approach involving various government ministries, departments, and agencies. The Ministry of Local Government in Uganda as the lead agency responsible for coordinating the implementation of the PDM at the national level whereas the districts and parishes are responsible for the implementation at the local level.

The PDM was designed to provide technical and financial support to the parishes in Uganda to help them implement their development plans. This support includes capacity building, provision of infrastructure, and access to credit facilities.

== Policy and Regulatory Framework ==
Implementation of the PDM was premised on the following policy and legal frameworks: Article 176, (2b, d, and e) of the Constitution of the Republic of Uganda (1995 as amended) provides that.

1. Decentralization
2. There shall be established for each Local Government Unit a sound financial base with reliable sources of revenue,
3. Appropriate measures shall be taken to enable Local Government Units to plan, initiate, and execute policies to all matters affecting the people within their jurisdiction.

== Criticism and challenges ==
PDM has been welcomed by many as a much-needed initiative to address the persistent poverty and underdevelopment in rural areas of Uganda. Some critics gave rise to concerns about the sustainability of the initiative and the potential for it to be used for political purposes.

There have been challenges with the implementation of the PDM, including inadequate funding, limited capacity of local government officials, and the limited participation of women and youth in the planning and implementation process.

== Further Considerations ==
The Parish Development Model represents a significant effort by the Ugandan government to improve service delivery and reduce poverty at the grassroots level. Its success primarily depends on the commitment of all stakeholders to work together towards achieving its objectives. The PDM was designed to transform the lives of millions of Ugandans and create sustainable development in the country.
