= Stella Kizza =

Ugandan politician

- Born: Stella Kizza; 1 January 1965 (age 61); Kyegwegwa District
- Citizenship: Ugandan
- Education: Ibaale Primary School, Mpanga Senior Secondary School, National College of Business Studies, Bachelor of Business Administration from Makerere University
- Occupations: Accountant and Politician
- Political party: National Resistance Movement

Stella Kizza (born 1 January 1965) is a Ugandan accountant and politician. She was the women representative member in the 10th Parliament of Uganda for Kyegegwa District. She was an independent candidate but later joined the ruling party National Resistance Movement (NRM).

== Background and education ==
Kizza was born in Kyegegwa District and attended Ibaale Primary School. She attained a Uganda Certificate of Education (UCE) from Mpanga Senior Secondary School in 1984.

In 1990, she attained a Uganda Diploma of Business Studies (UDBS) from National College of Business Studies, Nakawa, followed by a Bachelor of Business Administration from Makerere University in 1998. In 2008, she became a Certified Public Accountant from Institute of Certified Public Accountants, Uganda.

== Career and politics ==
Kizza was the division renames officer for Kampala City Council from 1991 to 2003, the Kyenjojo District local government district internal auditor from 2003 to 2007, an internal auditor at a law development centre and at the PIBID Project from 2007 to 2010, and chief finance officer for the Kyegegwa District local government from 2010 to 2012. She is a member of parliament from 2016 to 2021.

== See also ==
- List of members of the ninth Parliament of Uganda
- List of members of the tenth Parliament of Uganda
