= Veronica Isala Eragu Bichetero =

Ugandan politician

Woman Representative, Kaberamaido District
- Incumbent
- Assumed office 2016

Personal details
- Born: August 3, 1953 (age 72) Uganda
- Education: Bachelor of Laws, Makerere University (1972); Postgraduate Diploma in Legal Practice, Law Development Centre (1978)
- Alma mater: St. Mary’s College, Aboke; Dr Obote College, Boroboro; Makerere University; Law Development Centre
- Occupation: Lawyer, Politician
- Known for: Member of Parliament (2016–present); Commissioner, Uganda Human Rights Commission (2001–2007); Senior Fellow, United States Institute of Peace (2011–2012); Director & Senior Consultant, EDG Venture Consult (2007–2015)

Veronica Isala Eragu Bichetero is a Ugandan politician and lawyer member of the Parliament of Uganda for Kaberamaido District since 2016

She previously served as the director and senior consultant at EDG Venture Consult in Kampala from 2007 to 2015.

== Background and education ==
She was born on 3 August 1953.

She attended St Mary's College, Aboke for her East African Certificate of Education (EACE), in 1970 and Dr. Obote College, Boroboro for her East African Advanced Certificate of Education (EAACE). In 1972, she graduated from Makerere University in Uganda with a Bachelor of Laws and obtained a Postgraduate Diploma in Legal Practice from the Law Development Centre in Kampala in 1978.

== Career ==
She was Senior Fellow at the United States Institute of Peace, Washington DC from 2011 to 2012; Commissioner at Uganda Human Rights Commission from 2001 to 2007; she was also the sole partner at Eragu & Co. Advocates, Kampala, from 1998 to 2001; she was the Managing Partner & Consultant at Sentinel, Nairobi, from 1995 to 2001; she was as well the Senior Professional Consultant at the UNICEF Eastern and Southern Africa Regional Office, Nairobi, from 1992 to 1994. She was the Director/general manager at Apollo Insurance Company, Kenya, from 1987 to 1991; and she also worked as a Claims Manager/Executive Manager at Kenya Commercial Insurance Corporation from 1983 to 1987; and as a legal practitioner with Rhodes & Rhodes, Lagos, Nigeria, from 1980 to 1981; and as Legal Secretary at National Insurance Corporation, Uganda, from 1976 to 1980. After all that, she was finally elected to parliament in Uganda and has served as a member of parliament from 2016 to the present.

== Parliamentary duties ==
Besides her duties as a member of the Ugandan Parliament, she sits on the following parliamentary committees:

Committee Membership	Membership
COMMITTEE ON HUMAN RIGHTS	Member
COMMITTEE ON LEGAL AND PARLIAMENTARY AFFAIRS	Member
