= Samuel Okwir =

Ugandan politician

Honourable Samuel Okwir Odwe
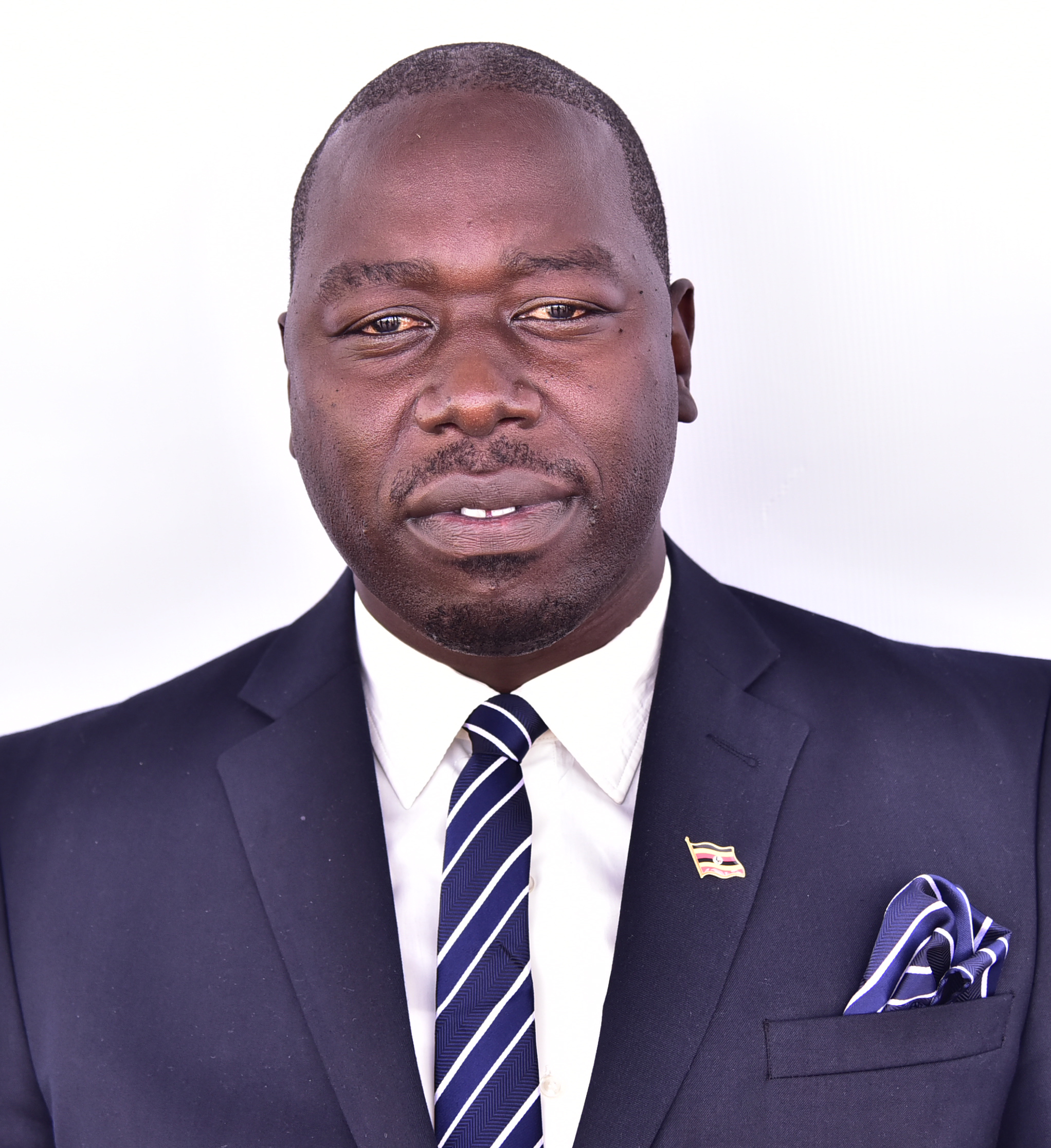
- Samuel Okwir Odwe

Member of the Parliament of Uganda
- Incumbent
- Assumed office 17 May 2016
- Constituency: Moroto County, Alebtong District

Personal details
- Born: Uganda
- Party: National Resistance Movement

Samuel Okwir Odwe is a Ugandan politician who serves as an MP of Uganda.

== Career ==
Okwir was first elected in the 2016 Ugandan general election to serve in the 10th parliament as an independent for Moroto County, Alebtong District and was reelected in the 2021 Ugandan general election as a member of the National Resistance Movement. He has been criticized for not contributing enough manifestos to the 11th parliament. His constituency has been predicted to be a close election in the 2026 Ugandan general election. In 2022, he was sued by businessman Morris Okwi over a debt of 120 million shillings, giving the man a fake cheque. He has also been accused of murder, with a man being allegedly found clubbed to death near his property after having an extramarital affair, however the police report found no such injuries on the man and the allegations were denied by the Lango majority whip.
