= Moses Adome =

Ugandan administrator and politician

Honorable

Personal details
- Born: Moses Adome; 28 December 1983 (age 42) Kotido, Uganda
- Education: Gulu University (Bachelor of Public Administration and Management)
- Occupation: Administrator, politician
- Known for: Public administration, politics

Moses Bildad Adome (born 28 December 1983) is a Ugandan administrator and politician. Moses Adome Bildad attended Gulu University. He is the elected Member of Parliament for Jie County, Kotido District, and a representative for NRM, the ruling political party in Uganda. He is a member of the NRM Parliamentary Caucus and serves on the Committee on Health in the 10th Parliament of Uganda. Also, he is the founding chairperson of the USAID funded Warrior Squad Foundation (WSF), based in Karamoja Sub-region.

Adoma's political influence has waned out recently, particularly after voting against the age limit removal bill during his term as MP. In May 2025, he was defeated by Peter Lonya in a rerun election for the NRM Kotido District party chairperson position.

== Political career and 2025 developments ==
- Recent Elections (2025): In May 2025, Adome lost a rerun election for the NRM Kotido District party chairmanship to Peter Lonya, who won with 79 votes to Adome's 74.
- 2026 Candidacy: As of late 2025, he is actively campaigning to return to Parliament, specifically eyeing the Kotido Municipality seat in the upcoming 2026 national elections. In July 2025, he was involved in a dispute over alleged NRM primary election irregularities involving leaked declaration forms.
- "Rebel" Reputation: He gained national attention as one of the "NRM rebel MPs" who voted against the 2017 constitutional amendment to remove the presidential age limit. This stance is widely cited as a reason for his subsequent marginalization within the ruling party.
- Past Roles: During his tenure in the 10th Parliament, he was a member of the Committee on Health.

== See also ==
- Kotido District
- Karamoja
- National Resistance Movement
