= Uganda Advanced Certificate of Education =

Secondary school diploma

In Uganda, students receive the Uganda Advanced Certificate of Education (UACE) when they finish the 2-year upper secondary school which is also called the HSC (meaning High School Certificate). It is comparable to GCE A-Level in the UK. UACE is also known colloquially as "A-Level". The examinations for the UACE are administered by the Uganda National Examinations Board (UNEB). This level marks the end of the Secondary level education in Uganda that takes at least 6 years.

== Educational purpose ==
UACE provides the prerequisite requirements for admission to the University or Technical institutes for further education to take on different courses on Certificate, diploma or degree level depending on the performance.

The examinations of UACE is monitored by a body call UNEB that was established in 1983 under the law of Uganda chapter 137 though the law was amended and replaced by UNEB act number 1 in 2021.

== See also ==
- Education in Uganda
- Uganda Certificate of Education
