= Uganda Certificate of Education =

Educational qualification in Uganda

In Uganda, students receive the Uganda Certificate of Education (UCE) when they finish the four year lower secondary school. It is comparable to GCE O-Level in the UK. UCE is also called "O-Level" by the people in Uganda. The UCE examinations are administered by the Uganda National Examinations Board (UNEB).

== See also ==
- Education in Uganda
- Uganda Advanced Certificate of Education
