= List of members of the ninth Parliament of Uganda =

This is a list of members elected to the ninth Parliament of Uganda (2011 to 2016) in the 2011 general election. It was preceded by the eighth Parliament and succeeded by the tenth Parliament.

== Composition ==
In the Ninth Parliament Rebecca Kadaga was Speaker, with Jacob Oulanyah as Deputy Speaker.

Party	Constituency			Women			Seats		
Party	Votes	%	Seats	Votes	%	Seats	Appointed	Total	+/–
National Resistance Movement	3,883,209	49.22	164	3,803,608	51.56	86	13	263	+50
Forum for Democratic Change	1,070,109	13.56	23	1,242,218	16.84	11	0	34	–3
Democratic Party	476,415	6.04	11	325,660	4.41	1	0	12	+4
Uganda People's Congress	265,568	3.37	7	237,477	3.22	3	0	10	+1
Justice Forum	50,120	0.64	1	10,796	0.15	0	0	1	0
Conservative Party	48,276	0.61	1	1,084	0.01	0	0	1	0
Uganda Federal Alliance	23,585	0.30	0	34,346	0.47	0	0	0	New
People's Progressive Party	15,692	0.20	0	26,320	0.36	0	0	0	New
Forum for Integrity in Leadership	8,871	0.11	0				0	0	New
Social Democratic Party	5,664	0.07	0				0	0	New
Popular People's Democracy	3,399	0.04	0				0	0	New
People's Development Party	2,526	0.03	0	1,853	0.03	0	0	0	New
Liberal Democratic Transparency	2,035	0.03	0	3,997	0.05	0	0	0	New
Green Partisan Party	297	0.00	0				0	0	New
Uganda Economic Party	207	0.00	0				0	0	New
Independents	2,034,250	25.78	30	1,689,389	22.90	11	2	43	+3
Uganda People's Defence Force							10	10	0
Vacant			1				–	1	–
Total	7,890,223	100.00	238	7,376,748	100.00	112	25	375	+56
Source: Electoral Commission, Election Passport

== Elected members ==
Name	Party	Constituency	District
Ayepa Michael	NRM	Labwor County	Abim District
Juliana Modesta Auma	NRM	Women's Representative	Abim District
Moses Ali	NRM	East Moyo County	Adjumani District
Ababiku Jesca	INDEP	Women's Representative	Adjumani District
Okot John Amos	NRM	Agago County	Agago District
Akello Judith Franca	FDC	Women's Representative	Agago District
Obua Denis Hamson	NRM	Ajuri County	Alebtong District
Obua Ogwal Benson	UPC	Moroto County	Alebtong District
Rebecca Amuge Otengo	NRM	Women's Representative	Alebtong District
Okello Anthony	NRM	Kioga County	Amolatar District
Amali Caroline Okao	INDEP	Women's Representative	Amolatar District
Micah Akasile Lolem	NRM	Upe County	Amudat District
Rosemary Nauwat	NRM	Women's Representative	Amudat District
Ecweru Musa Francis	NRM	Amuria County	Amuria District
Eriaku Peter Emmanuel	NRM	Kapelebyong County	Amuria District
Amero Susan	NRM	Women's Representative	Amuria District
Olanya Gilbert	INDEP	Kilak County	Amuru District
Ayoo Tonny	NRM	Kwania County	Apac District
Akora Maxwell Ebong Patrick	UPC	Maruzi County	Apac District
Ajok Lucy	UPC	Women's Representative	Apac District
Ajedra Gabriel Gadison Aridru	NRM	Arua Municipality	Arua District
Atiku Benard	FDC	Ayivu County	Arua District
Drito Martin Andi	NRM	Madi-Okollo County	Arua District
Wadri Kassiano Ezati	FDC	Terego County	Arua District
Okuonzi Sam Agatre	INDEP	Vurra County	Arua District
Bako Christine Abia	FDC	Women's Representative	Arua District
Mbogo Kezekia	INDEP	Budaka County	Budaka District
Twa-Twa Mutwalante Jeremiah	NRM	Iki-Iki County	Budaka District
Kataike Sarah Ndoboli	NRM	Women's Representative	Budaka District
Wakikona Wandendeya David	NRM	Manjiya County	Bududa District
Khainza Justine	NRM	Women's Representative	Bududa District
Oguttu Wafula Phillip	FDC	Bukooli County Central	Bugiri District
Baka Stephen Mugabi	NRM	Bukooli County North	Bugiri District
Kasule Justine Lumumba	NRM	Women's Representative	Bugiri District
Biraaro Ephraim Ganshanga	NRM	Buhweju County	Buhweju District
Oliver Katwesigye Koyekyenga	NRM	Women's Representative	Buhweju District
Kakoba Onyango	NRM	Buikwe County North	Buikwe District
Bayigga Micheal P. Lulume	DP	Buikwe County South	Buikwe District
Ssali Baker	NRM	Buikwe County West	Buikwe District
Mpiima Dorothy Christine	NRM	Women's Representative	Buikwe District
Ekuma George Stephen	NRM	Bukedea County	Bukedea District
Akol Rose Okullu	NRM	Women's Representative	Bukedea District
Kiyingi Deogratius	DP	Bukomansimbi County	Bukomansimbi District
Namaganda Susan	DP	Women's Representative	Bukomansimbi District
Sabila Nelson	NRM	Kongasis County	Bukwo District
Tete Chelangat Everline	NRM	Women's Representative	Bukwo District
Wamakuyu Mudimi Ignatius	NRM	Bulambuli County	Bulambuli District
Muloni Irene Nafuna	NRM	Women's Representative	Bulambuli District
Biraahwa Mukitale Stephen Adyeeri	NRM	Buliisa County	Buliisa District
Mpairwe Beatrice	NRM	Women's Representative	Buliisa District
Matte Joseph Sibalinghana Kiregheya	INDEP	Bughendera	Bundibugyo District
Kamanda Cos Bataringaya	NRM	Bwamba County	Bundibugyo District
Ntabazi Harriet	NRM	Women's Representative	Bundibugyo District
Tayebwa Odo	FDC	Bushenyi-Ishaka Municipality	Bushenyi District
Mawanda Michael Maranga	NRM	Igara County East	Bushenyi District
Magyezi Raphael	NRM	Igara County West	Bushenyi District
Busingye Mary Karooro Okurut	NRM	Women's Representative	Bushenyi District
Taaka Kevinah Wanaha Wandera	FDC	Busia Municipality	Busia District
Mulimba John	NRM	Samia-Bugwe County North	Busia District
Julius Wandera Maganda	INDEP	Samia-Bugwe County South	Busia District
Nekesa Barbara Oundo	NRM	Women's Representative	Busia District
Dombo Emmanuel Lumala	NRM	Bunyole County East	Butaleja District
Wangolo Jacob	NRM	Bunyole County West	Butaleja District
Nebanda Florence Andiru	NRM	Women's Representative	Butaleja District
Muwanga Muhammad Kivumbi	DP	Butambala County	Butambala District
Nalubega Mariam Patience	INDEP	Women's Representative	Butambala District
Migadde Robert Ndugwa	NRM	Buvuma Islands County	Buvuma District
Egunyu Nantume Janepher	NRM	Women's Representative	Buvuma District
Balyejjusa Sulaiman Kirunda	NRM	Budiope County East	Buyende District
Mubito John Bosco	NRM	Budiope County West	Buyende District
Babirye Veronica Kadogo	NRM	Women's Representative	Buyende District
Okot Ogong Felix	NRM	Dokolo County	Dokolo District
Atim Ogwal Cecilia Barbara	FDC	Women's Representative	Dokolo District
Najjemba Rosemary Muyinda	NRM	Gomba County	Gomba District
Nakato Kyabangi Katusiime	NRM	Women's Representative	Gomba District
Okumu Ronald Reagan	FDC	Aswa County	Gulu District
Acire Christopher	FDC	Gulu Municipality	Gulu District
Oulanyah Jacob L'Okori	NRM	Omoro County	Gulu District
Betty Aol Ochan	FDC	Women's Representative	Gulu District
Kiiza Rwebembera James	NRM	Bugahya County	Hoima District
Bigirwa Julius Junjura	NRM	Buhaguzi County	Hoima District
Kajura Henry Muganwa	NRM	Hoima Municipality	Hoima District
Kaahwa Tophace Byagira	NRM	Women's Representative	Hoima District
Xavier Kyooma	NRM	Ibanda County North	Ibanda District
Byabagambi John	NRM	Ibanda County South	Ibanda District
Kiboijana Margaret Namara	NRM	Women's Representative	Ibanda District
Katuntu Abdu	FDC	Bugweri County	Iganga District
Mugema Peter	NRM	Iganga Municipality	Iganga District
Baliddawa Edward	NRM	Kigulu County North	Iganga District
Muwuma Milton Kalulu	NRM	Kigulu County South	Iganga District
Kabaale Kwagala Olivia	NRM	Women's Representative	Iganga District
Kangwagye Stephen	NRM	Bukanga County	Isingiro District
Rwamirama Bright Kanyontore	NRM	Isingiro County North	Isingiro District
Byarugaba Alex Bakunda	NRM	Isingiro County South	Isingiro District
Byarugaba Grace Isingoma	NRM	Women's Representative	Isingiro District
Migereko Daudi	NRM	Butembe County	Jinja District
Mwiru Paul	FDC	Jinja Municipality East	Jinja District
Balyeku Moses Grace	NRM	Jinja Municipality West	Jinja District
Mbagadhi Frederick Nkayi	NRM	Kagoma County	Jinja District
Nabirye Agnes	NRM	Women's Representative	Jinja District
Lokeris Samson	NRM	Dodoth County East	Kaabong District
Lokodo Simon	NRM	Dodoth County West	Kaabong District
Akello Rose Lilly	INDEP	Women's Representative	Kaabong District
Baryayanga Andrew Aja	INDEP	Kabale Municipality	Kabale District
Niwagaba Wilfred	NRM	Ndorwa County East	Kabale District
Bahati David	NRM	Ndorwa County West	Kabale District
Musasizi Henry Ariganyira	NRM	Rubanda County East	Kabale District
Banyenzaki Henry	NRM	Rubanda County West	Kabale District
Sabiiti Jack	FDC	Rukiga County	Kabale District
Ninsiima Ronah Rita	INDEP	Women's Representative	Kabale District
Mwesige Adolf Kasaija	NRM	Bunyangabu County	Kabarole District
Kasaija Stephen Kagwera	NRM	Burahya County	Kabarole District
Ruhunda Alex	NRM	Fort Portal Municipality	Kabarole District
Businge Rusoke Victoria	NRM	Women's Representative	Kabarole District
Omona Kenneth Olusegun	NRM	Kaberamaido County	Kaberamaido District
Ongalo Obote Clement Keneth	NRM	Kalaki County	Kaberamaido District
Ekwau Ibi Florence	FDC	Women's Representative	Kaberamaido District
Badda Fred	NRM	Bujumba County	Kalangala District
Lwanga Timothy Mutekanga	NRM	Kyamuswa County	Kalangala District
Nanyondo Birungi Carolyn	NRM	Women's Representative	Kalangala District
Lubogo Kenneth	INDEP	Bulamogi County	Kaliro District
Nabugere Flavia	NRM	Women's Representative	Kaliro District
Ssempijja Vincent Bamulangaki	INDEP	Kalungu County East	Kalungu District
Ssewungu Joseph Gonzaga	DP	Kalungu County West	Kalungu District
Kintu Florence	NRM	Women's Representative	Kalungu District
Ssebaggala Abdu Latif Sengendo	DP	Kawempe Division North	Kampala District
Sebuliba Mutumba Richard	DP	Kawempe Division South	Kampala District
Ssimbwa John	NRM	Makindye Division East	Kampala District
Kyanjo Hussein	JEEMA	Makindye Division West	Kampala District
Kasibante Moses	INDEP	Rubaga Division North	Kampala District
Lukyamuzi John Ken	CP	Rubaga Division South	Kampala District
Naggayi Nabilah Sempala	FDC	Women's Representative	Kampala District
Nsereko Muhammad	NRM	Central Division	Kampala District
Ruhindi Fredrick	NRM	Nakawa Division	Kampala District
Allen Andrew	INDEP	Bugabula County North	Kamuli District
Kiyingi Asuman	INDEP	Bugabula County South	Kamuli District
Mugabi Muzaale Martin Kisule	NRM	Buzaaya County	Kamuli District
Alitwala Rebecca Kadaga	NRM	Women's Representative	Kamuli District
Tumwebaze Kagyigyi Frank	NRM	Kibale County	Kamwenge District
Byamukama Nulu	NRM	Kitagwenda County	Kamwenge District
Nshaija Dorothy Kabaraitsya	NRM	Women's Representative	Kamwenge District
Baryomunsi Chris	NRM	Kinkiizi County East	Kanungu District
Amama Mbabazi	NRM	Kinkiizi County West	Kanungu District
Karungi Elizabeth	NRM	Women's Representative	Kanungu District
Chebrot Stephen Chemoiko	NRM	Tingey County	Kapchorwa District
Chemutai Phyllis	INDEP	Women's Representative	Kapchorwa District
Bwambale Bihande Yokasi	FDC	Bukonjo County East	Kasese District
Kiyonga Chrispus Walter Bazarrabusa	NRM	Bukonjo County West	Kasese District
Nzoghu M. William	FDC	Busongora County North	Kasese District
Kafuda Boaz	NRM	Busongora County South	Kasese District
Mbahimba James	NRM	Kasese Municipality	Kasese District
Kiiza Winifred	FDC	Women's Representative	Kasese District
Amodoi Cyrus Imalingat	INDEP	Toroma County	Katakwi District
Alengot Proscovia Oromait	NRM	Usuk County	Katakwi District
Alupo Jessica Rose Epel	NRM	Women's Representative	Katakwi District
Lugoloobi Amos	NRM	Ntenjeru County North	Kayunga District
Nsanja Patrick K. Mabirizi	INDEP	Ntenjeru County South	Kayunga District
Nantaba Idah Erios	NRM	Women's Representative	Kayunga District
Madada Kyebakoze Sulaiman	NRM	Bbaale County	Kayunga District
Bakeine Mabel Lillian Komugisha	NRM	Bugangaizi County East	Kibaale District
Kasirivu-Atwooki Baltazar Kyamanywa	NRM	Bugangaizi County West	Kibaale District
Besisira Ignatius	NRM	Buyaga County East	Kibaale District
Tinkasiimire Barnabas Ateenyi	NRM	Buyaga County West	Kibaale District
Kasaija Matia	NRM	Buyanja County	Kibaale District
Nabbanja Robinah	NRM	Women's Representative	Kibaale District
Kabajo James Kyewalabye	NRM	Kiboga County East	Kiboga District
Nankabirwa Ruth Sentamu	NRM	Women's Representative	Kiboga District
Kamba Saleh Moses Wilson	NRM	Kibuku County	Kibuku District
Mwebaza Sarah Wenene	NRM	Women's Representative	Kibuku District
Nasasira John Nwoono	NRM	Kazo County	Kiruhura District
Mwesigye Fred	NRM	Nyabushozi County	Kiruhura District
Barumba Beatrice Rusaniya Namala	NRM	Women's Representative	Kiruhura District
Otada Sam Owor Amooti	INDEP	Kibanda County	Kiryandongo District
Hellen Kahunde	NRM	Women's Representative	Kiryandongo District
Kwizera Eddie Wa Gahungu	NRM	Bufumbira County East	Kisoro District
Kamara John Nizeyimana	NRM	Bufumbira County North	Kisoro District
Bucyanayandi Tress	NRM	Bufumbira County South	Kisoro District
Nyirabashitsi Sarah Mateke	NRM	Women's Representative	Kisoro District
Oryem Henry Okello	NRM	Chua County	Kitgum District
Beatrice Atim Anywar	FDC	Women's Representative	Kitgum District
Awongo Ahmed	NRM	Koboko County	Koboko District
Baba Diri Margaret	NRM	Women's Representative	Koboko District
Ebil Fred	UPC	Kole County	Kole District
Acheng Joy Ruth	UPC	Women's Representative	Kole District
Lokii Peter Abrahams	NRM	Jie County	Kotido District
Margaret Aachilla Aleper	NRM	Women's Representative	Kotido District
Amuriat Oboi Patrick	FDC	Kumi County	Kumi District
Amongin Aporu Christine Hellen	NRM	Women's Representative	Kumi District
Chemaswet Abdi Fadhil Kisos	NRM	Kween County	Kween District
Chekwel Lydia	NRM	Women's Representative	Kween District
Ssemugaba Samuel	NRM	Kiboga County West	Kyankwanzi District
Nankabirwa Ann Maria	NRM	Women's Representative	Kyankwanzi District
Kwemara Ngabu William	NRM	Kyaka County	Kyegegwa District
Kabahenda Flavia Rwabuhoro	NRM	Women's Representative	Kyegegwa District
Muhumuza David	NRM	Mwenge County North	Kyenjojo District
Kajara Aston Peterson	NRM	Mwenge County South	Kyenjojo District
Timbigamba Lyndah	NRM	Women's Representative	Kyenjojo District
Onek Obaloker Hilary	NRM	Lamwo County	Lamwo District
Lanyero Sarah Ochieng	NRM	Women's Representative	Lamwo District
Omara Geoffrey	NRM	Erute County North	Lira District
Engola Sam	NRM	Erute County South	Lira District
Akena James Micheal Jimmy	UPC	Lira Municipality	Lira District
Atim Joy Ongom	INDEP	Women's Representative	Lira District
Bagoole John B	INDEP	Luuka County	Luuka District
Kaabule Evelyn Naome Mpagi N.	NRM	Women's Representative	Luuka District
Muyingo John Chrysestom	INDEP	Bamunanika County	Luwero District
Byandala Abraham James	NRM	Katikamu County North	Luwero District
Khiddu Makubuya Edward	NRM	Katikamu County South	Luwero District
Nabukenya Brenda	DP	Women's Representative	Luwero District
Sejjoba Issac	NRM	Bukoto County Mid-West	Lwengo District
Birekeraawo Nsubuga Mathius	DP	Bukoto County South	Lwengo District
Kitatta Aboud	NRM	Bukoto County West	Lwengo District
Nakabira Gertrude Lubega	NRM	Women's Representative	Lwengo District
Kakooza James	NRM	Kabula County	Lyantonde District
Namara Grace	INDEP	Women's Representative	Lyantonde District
Mulongo Simon	NRM	Bubulo County East	Manafwa District
Mutonyi Rose Masaba	NRM	Bubulo County West	Manafwa District
Kayagi Sarah Netalisire	NRM	Women's Representative	Manafwa District
Aadroa Alex Onzima	INDEP	Maracha County	Maracha District
Lematia Ruth Molly Ondoru	NRM	Women's Representative	Maracha District
Ssekandi Edward Kiwanuka	NRM	Bukoto County Central	Masaka District
Namayanja Florence	DP	Bukoto County East	Masaka District
Mpuuga Mathias	INDEP	Masaka Municipality	Masaka District
Kase-Mubanda Freda Nanzira	NRM	Women's Representative	Masaka District
Kabakumba Masiko Labwoni Princess	NRM	Bujenje County	Masindi District
Nyiira Zerubabel Mijumbi	NRM	Buruuli County	Masindi District
Kiiza Monday Ernest Apuuli	NRM	Masindi Municipality	Masindi District
Bintu Jalia Lukumu N. Abwooli	NRM	Women's Representative	Masindi District
Waira Kyewalabye Majegere S.J.	NRM	Bunya County East	Mayuge District
Isabirye Iddi	NRM	Bunya County South	Mayuge District
Bagiire Vincent Waiswa O.	NRM	Bunya County West	Mayuge District
Nakadama Lukia Isanga	NRM	Women's Representative	Mayuge District
Gudoi Yahaya	NRM	Bungokho County North	Mbale District
Kafabusa Werikhe Michael	NRM	Bungokho County South	Mbale District
Wamanga Wamai Jack	FDC	Mbale Municipality	Mbale District
Nakayenze Connie Galiwango	NRM	Women's Representative	Mbale District
Yaguma Wilberforce	NRM	Kashari County	Mbarara District
Bitekyerezo Kab Medard	NRM	Mbarara Municipality	Mbarara District
Mujuni Vicent Kyamadidi	NRM	Rwampara County	Mbarara District
Boona Emma	NRM	Women's Representative	Mbarara District
Kahinda Otafiire	NRM	Ruhindi County	Mitooma District
Kamateeka Jovah	NRM	Women's Representative	Mitooma District
Nyanzi Vincent Makumbi	NRM	Busujju County	Mityana District
Kiwanda Godfrey Ssubi	NRM	Mityana County North	Mityana District
Kaddumukasa Ssozi Jerome	INDEP	Mityana County South	Mityana District
Ssinabulya Sylivia Namabidde	NRM	Women's Representative	Mityana District
Lokii John Baptist	NRM	Matheniko County	Moroto District
Aleper Simon Peter	NRM	Moroto Municipality	Moroto District
Iriama Margaret	NRM	Women's Representative	Moroto District
Fungaroo Kaps Hassan	FDC	Obongi County	Moyo District
Alero Tom Aza	NRM	West Moyo County	Moyo District
Auru Anne	NRM	Women's Representative	Moyo District
Kyambadde Amelia Anne	NRM	Mawokota County North	Mpigi District
Kiyingi Bbosa Kenneth Joseph	INDEP	Mawokota County South	Mpigi District
Nakawunde Sarah Temulanda	NRM	Women's Representative	Mpigi District
Ssemmuli Anthony	NRM	Buwekula County	Mubende District
Mulindwa Patrick	NRM	Kasambya County	Mubende District
Lubega Godfrey	INDEP	Kassanda County North	Mubende District
Nyombi Thembo George William	NRM	Kassanda County South	Mubende District
Namugwanya Benny Bugembe	NRM	Women's Representative	Mubende District
Kibuule Ronald	NRM	Mukono County North	Mukono District
Bakaluba Mukasa Peter	NRM	Mukono County South	Mukono District
Bakireke Nambooze Betty	DP	Mukono Municipality	Mukono District
Kafeero Ssekitoleko Robert	INDEP	Nakifuma County	Mukono District
Kusasira Peace Kanyesigye Mubiru	NRM	Women's Representative	Mukono District
Lokeris Aimat Peter	NRM	Chekwii County	Nakapiripirit District
Achia Remigio	NRM	Pian County	Nakapiripirit District
Iriama Rose	INDEP	Women's Representative	Nakapiripirit District
Bbumba Syda M. Namirembe	NRM	Nakaseke County North	Nakaseke District
Sempala Mbuga Edward William	NRM	Nakaseke County South	Nakaseke District
Namayanja Rose Nsereko	NRM	Women's Representative	Nakaseke District
Mukasa Muruli Wilson	NRM	Budyebo County	Nakasongola District
Nyombi Peter	NRM	Nakasongola County	Nakasongola District
Komuhangi Margaret	NRM	Women's Representative	Nakasongola District
Mayende Stephen Dede	NRM	Bukooli County South	Namayingo District
Okeyoh Peter	NRM	Bukooli Islands County	Namayingo District
Makhoha Margaret	NRM	Women's Representative	Namayingo District
Asupasa Isiko Wilson Mpongo	NRM	Busiki County	Namutumba District
Mutyabule Florence Tibafana	NRM	Women's Representative	Namutumba District
Achia Terence Naco	NRM	Bokora County	Napak District
Namoe Stella Nyomera	NRM	Women's Representative	Napak District
Jacan Omach Fred Mandir	NRM	Jonam County	Nebbi District
Anywarach Joshua Carter	INDEP	Padyere County	Nebbi District
Acayo Christine Cwinya-Ai	NRM	Women's Representative	Nebbi District
Epetait Francis	FDC	Ngora County	Ngora District
Jacqueline Amongin	NRM	Women's Representative	Ngora District
Bahinduka Mugarra Martin	INDEP	Ntoroko County	Ntoroko District
Mujungu Jennifer K.	INDEP	Women's Representative	Ntoroko District
Tashobya N. Stephen	NRM	Kajara County	Ntungamo District
Musinguzi Yona	NRM	Ntugamo Municipality	Ntungamo District
Kataaha Janet Museveni	NRM	Ruhaama County	Ntungamo District
Rukutana Mwesigwa	NRM	Rushenyi County	Ntungamo District
Kabasharira Naome	NRM	Women's Representative	Ntungamo District
Todwong Richard	NRM	Nwoya County	Nwoya District
Adong Lilly	NRM	Women's Representative	Nwoya District
Ogwal Jacinto Deusdedit	UPC	Otuke County	Otuke District
Nyakecho Okwenye Annet	NRM	Women's Representative	Otuke District
Ayena Krispus	UPC	Oyam County North	Oyam District
Amongi Betty Ongom	UPC	Oyam County South	Oyam District
Alum Santa Ogwang	UPC	Women's Representative	Oyam District
Odonga Otto	FDC	Aruu County	Pader District
Lowila Cd Oketayot	NRM	Women's Representative	Pader District
Ochwa David	NRM	Agule County	Pallisa District
Mutono Patrick Lodoi	NRM	Butebo County	Pallisa District
Opolot Jacob Richards	NRM	Pallisa County	Pallisa District
Amoit Judith Mary	NRM	Women's Representative	Pallisa District
Kasamba Mathias	NRM	Kakuuto County	Rakai District
Mandera Amos	NRM	Kooki County	Rakai District
Kyeyune Harun	INDEP	Kyotera County	Rakai District
Mutagamba Maria	NRM	Women's Representative	Rakai District
Cadet Benjamin	INDEP	Bunyaruguru County	Rubirizi District
Katoto Hatwib	NRM	Katerera County	Rubirizi District
Mbabazi Betty Ahimbisibwe	NRM	Women's Representative	Rubirizi District
Turyahikayo Kebirungi Mary Paula	NRM	Rubabo County	Rukungiri District
Muhwezi Jim Katugugu	NRM	Rujumbura County	Rukungiri District
Mugume Roland	FDC	Rukungiri Municipality	Rukungiri District
Mbaguta Sezi Prisca Bessy	NRM	Women's Representative	Rukungiri District
Okupa Elijah	FDC	Kasilo County	Serere District
Ochola Stephen	FDC	Serere County	Serere District
Alaso Alice Asianut	FDC	Women's Representative	Serere District
Tumwesigye Elioda	NRM	Sheema County North	Sheema District
Katwiremu Yorokamu Bategana	NRM	Sheema County South	Sheema District
Nyakikongoro Rosemary	INDEP	Women's Representative	Sheema District
Ssasaga Isaias Johny	FDC	Budadiri County East	Sironko District
Nandala-Mafabi Nathan	FDC	Budadiri County West	Sironko District
Wadada Femiar	FDC	Women's Representative	Sironko District
Omolo Peter	FDC	Soroti County	Soroti District
Mukula George Michael	NRM	Soroti Municipality	Soroti District
Osegge Angelline	FDC	Women's Representative	Soroti District
Ssekikubo Theodore	NRM	Lwemiyaga County	Ssembabule District
Kutesa Kahamba Sam	NRM	Mawogola County	Ssembabule District
Bangirana Anifa Kawooya	NRM	Women's Representative	Ssembabule District
Ekanya Geofrey	FDC	Tororo County	Tororo District
Tanna Sanjay	INDEP	Tororo Municipality	Tororo District
Odoi Oywelowo Fox	INDEP	West Budama County North	Tororo District
Oboth Marksons Jacob	INDEP	West Budama County South	Tororo District
Achieng Sarah Opendi	NRM	Women's Representative	Tororo District
Lubega Medard Sseggona	DP	Busiro County East	Wakiso District
Bukenya Balibaseka Gilbert	NRM	Busiro County North	Wakiso District
Mutebi Joseph Balikudembe	DP	Busiro County South	Wakiso District
Kawuma Mohamed	DP	Entebbe Municipality	Wakiso District
Ssemujju Ibrahim Nganda	FDC	Kyadondo County East	Wakiso District
Kasule Robert Sebunya	NRM	Kyadondo County North	Wakiso District
Kikungwe Issa	DP	Kyadondo County South	Wakiso District
Nansubuga Seninde Rosemary	NRM	Women's Representative	Wakiso District
Achile Manoah Mila	INDEP	Aringa County	Yumbe District
Oleru Huda Abason	NRM	Women's Representative	Yumbe District
Kwiyucwiny Grace Freedom	NRM	Women's Representative	Zombo District
Nalubega Mary Tuunde	INDEP	Workers' Representative	
Arinaitwe Rwakajara K.	NRM	Workers' Representative	
Lyomoki Samuel	NRM	Workers' Representative	
Nabulya Theopista Ssentongo	NRM	Workers' Representative	
Bakabulindi Charles	NRM	Workers' Representative	
Asamo Hellen Grace	NRM	Representative of People with Disabilities	
Katuramu Hood Kiribedda	NRM	Representative of People with Disabilities	
Safia Juuko Nalule	NRM	Representative of People with Disabilities	
Ndeezi Alex	NRM	Representative of People with Disabilities	
Nokrach William Wilson	NRM	Representative of People with Disabilities	
Karuhanga Kafureeka Gerald	INDEP	Representative of the Youth	
Amoding Monicah	NRM	Representative of the Youth	
Nakabale Patrick	NRM	Representative of the Youth	
Ogwang Peter	NRM	Representative of the Youth	
Anite Evelyn	NRM	Representative of the Youth	
Angina Charles	Representative of the Uganda People's Defence Forces		
Katirima Manoni Phinehas	Representative of the Uganda People's Defence Forces		
Katumba Wamala	Representative of the Uganda People's Defence Forces		
Lakot Susan	Representative of the Uganda People's Defence Forces		
Mpabwa Sarah Patience	Representative of the Uganda People's Defence Forces		
Oketta Julius Facki	Representative of the Uganda People's Defence Forces		
Oula Innocent	Representative of the Uganda People's Defence Forces		
Owoyesigire Jim	Representative of the Uganda People's Defence Forces		
Elly Tuhirirwe Tumwine	Representative of the Uganda People's Defence Forces		

== Ex officio members ==
Name
Agnes Egunyu Akiror
Boliiba James Baba
Shem Bajura Bageine
Kabwegyere Tarsis Bazana
Giw Simon D'Ujanga
Ephraim Kamuntu
Maria Kiwanuka
Jeje Odongo
Rugunda Ruhakana
