= Ekwau Ibi Florence =

Ugandan politician

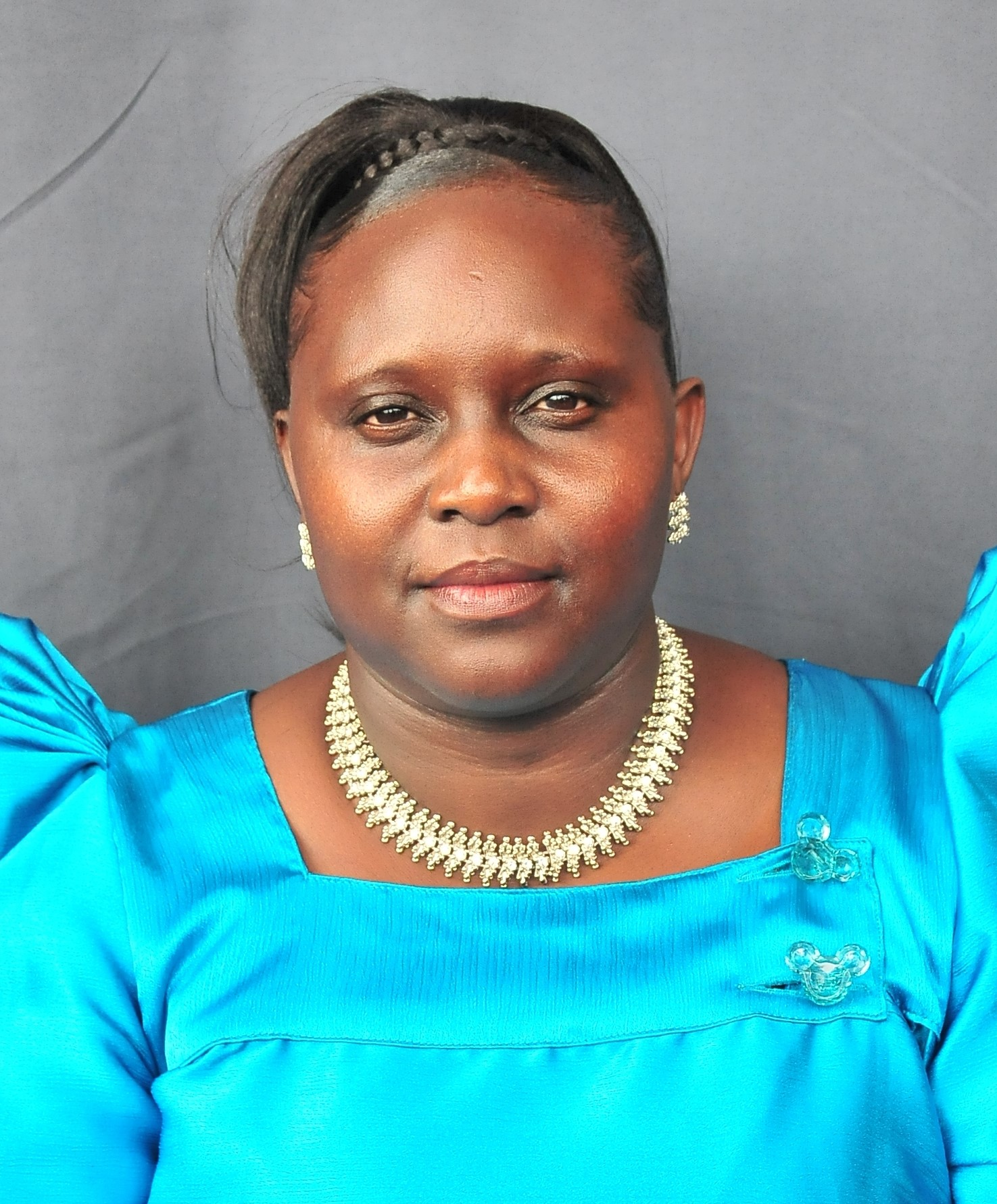
Ekwa Ibi Florence.jpg

Ekwau Ibi Florence is a Ugandan politician and legislator. She is the woman MP for Kaberamaido district in the eleventh parliament under FDC political party.

== Political career. ==
On 6 Feb 2017, Ekwau Florence was as the flag bearer for the Forum for Democratic Change to the East African Legislative Assembly (EALA). She emerged as the winner out of the nine candidates nominated by the party's electoral commission.

== See also ==
- Bako Christine Abia
- Rosemary Nauwat
- List of members of the ninth Parliament of Uganda
