= Christine Lanyero Awany =

Ugandan businessperson and politician

Woman member of Parliament for Nwoya District
- In office 2026–2031
- Constituency: Nwoya District

Personal details
- Born: Christine Lanyero Awany
- Party: National Resistance Movement
- Occupation: Businessperson, politician
- Known for: Entrepreneurship and political leadership in Nwoya District

Christine Lanyero Awany, also known as Mego Larem, is a Ugandan businessperson and politician. In the 2026 Ugandan general election, she was elected to the Parliament of Uganda as a woman's representative for Nwoya District. She was elected for the National Resistance Movement party for the term 2026–2031 with 12,715 votes as confirmed by the Electoral Commission of Uganda.

== Background ==
She is also an entrepreneur in Nwoya District. Her family roots are linked to the Patira clan, from which she has publicly acknowledged receiving traditional blessings during her political engagements. She is associated with the transport and hospitality sectors.

== See also ==
- Parliament of Uganda
- List of members of the twelfth Parliament of Uganda
- Nwoya District
- National Resistance Movement
- Ugandan politics
- Kwizera Eudia
- Lanyero Sarah Ochieng
- Sharon Balmoi Laker
