= Isingoma =

Isingoma can be a given name or a surname. Notable people with the name include:

- Isingoma Labongo Rukidi (fl. 16th century), king of Bunyoro-Kitara in modern-day Uganda
- Byarugaba Grace Isingoma, Ugandan parliamentarian
- Henri Isingoma, DRC Anglican bishop
