= Iriama Margaret =

Ugandan politician

- Born: 3 November 1965 (age 60)
- Citizenship: Ugandan
- Occupation: Politician
- Known for: Politics
- Political party: National Resistance Movement

Iriama Margaret (born 3 November 1965) is a Ugandan politician representing Moroto District in the eighth and ninth Parliament of Uganda. She belongs to the ruling National Resistance Movement political party.

== Politics ==
Margaret served as the eighth and ninth Member of Parliament at the Parliament of Uganda. While at the Parliament, she served as the deputy chairperson Health committee to Sam Lyomoki. In 2017, she was among the candidate for NRM primary elections in Moroto aimed at choosing a candidate for the district Woman Parliamentary seat which fell vacant on February 14 following the death of Annie Logiel who was the MP for the district. Annie Logiel died in Denmark. She appeared to have created rifts in the NRM party as a result of the primary poll and this led to some NRM party members expressing openly about their disappointment following the way the district leaders treated Iriama, who represented Moroto District in Parliament between 2011 and 2016. This was because the Moroto voters needed a new leadership not belonging the NRM as a political party in the district. The election was won by Stella Atyang who said that her priority is to reconcile with Iriama and her supporters in order to serve Moroto community well. However, Stella is also the National Resistance Movement (NRM) party candidate.

== See also ==
- List of members of the ninth Parliament of Uganda
- List of members of the eighth Parliament of Uganda
- Iriama Rose
