= Ninsiima Ronah Rita =

Ugandan politician (born 1978)

- Born: 31 March 1978 (age 47)
- Citizenship: Ugandan
- Education: Kigezi High School, International Professions Academy in Kabale district, Mbarara Adult Education Centre, Mbarara University of Science and Technology
- Occupations: Politician, Journalist
- Predecessor: Hope Mwesigye
- Successor: Catherina Ndamira Atwikiire

Ninsiima Ronah Rita (born 31 March 1978) Is a Ugandan politician and journalist who was the women representative member of parliament for Kabale District in the 9th Parliament of Uganda. She beat former agriculture minister Hope Mwesigye who had represented the constituency since 1994 in the 2011 Uganda general elections on February 18 replacing her for the seat between 2011 and 2016. Rita was an independent candidate after losing the National Resistance Movement (NRM) primaries to Hope Mwesigye.

== Biography ==
Rita was born in a polygamous family. She took her O-levels at Kigezi High School and received a diploma in Business Management from International Professions Academy in Kabale district in 1997. She worked at Kigezi Private Sector Promotion Centre and later at Voice of Kigezi radio in 2000 where she co-hosted a programme called "Ruhondeza". In 2005, Rita took a job as a news anchor at Radio West in Mbarara before becoming a politician in 2011. Rita lost the seat to Catherina Ndamira Atwikiire for the Women Representative member of Parliament for Kabale District in the 10th Parliament of Uganda in 2016.

== Personal life ==
Rita contracted COVID-19 on 7 September 2021. After surviving, Rita was said to have given her life to God.

== See also ==
- List of members of the ninth Parliament of Uganda
- Hope Mwesigye
- Catherina Ndamira Atwikiire
