= Juliana Modesta Auma =

Ugandan politician (born 1964)

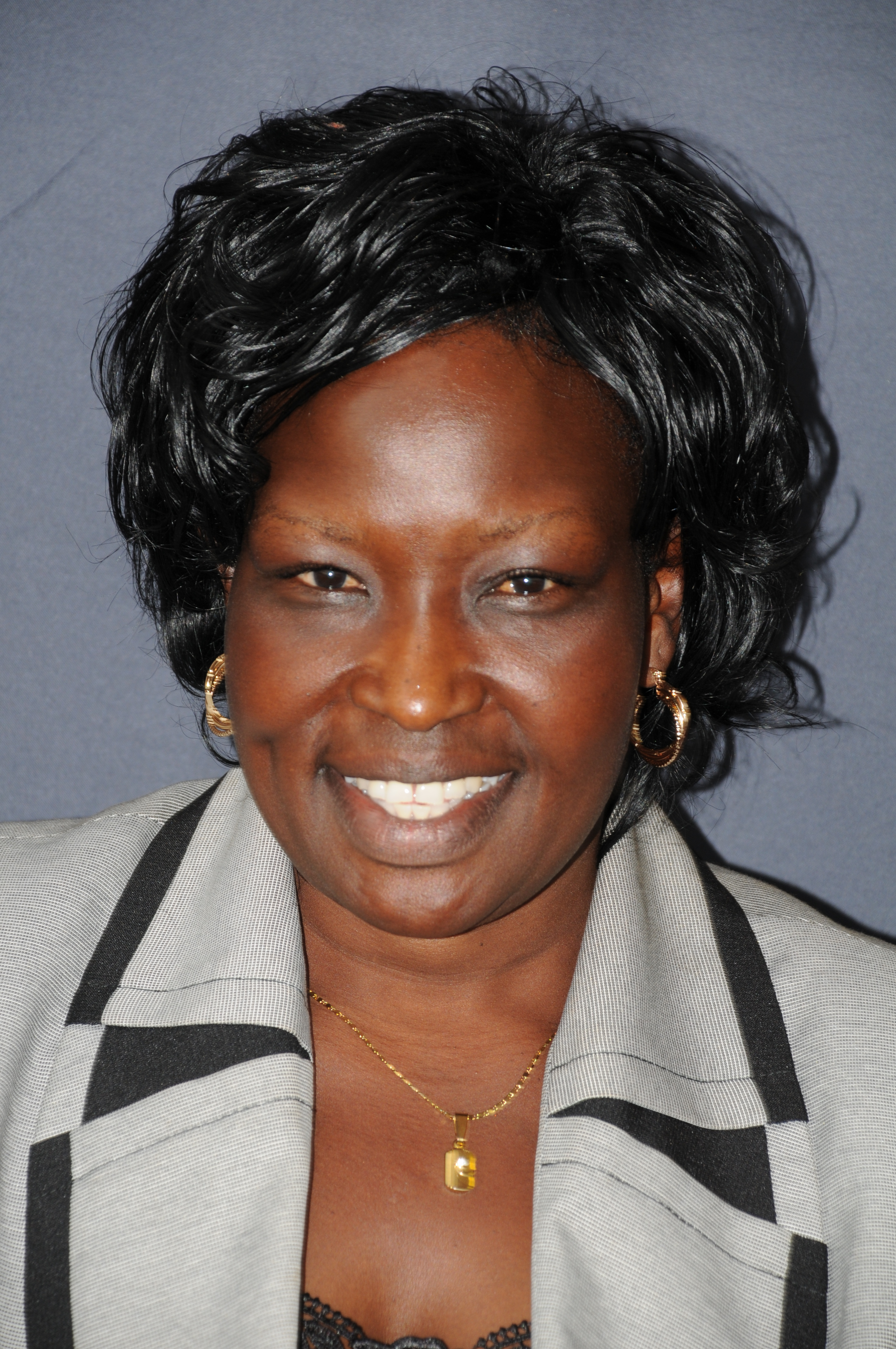
- Born: 14 October 1964 (age 61)
- Citizenship: Ugandan
- Occupation: Politician
- Known for: Politics
- Political party: National Resistance Movement

Juliana Modesta Auma (born 14 October 1964) is a Ugandan politician. She was the member of parliament in the ninth Parliament of Uganda representing Abim District under the National Resistance Movement political party.

== Political journey ==
Auma was the member of parliament in the ninth parliament of Uganda. She lost her seat to the parliament between (2011-2016) partly because she was reported to have used her first five years as a first term member of parliament to chase for land deals instead of legislating for her electors. During the 2021 general elections, she contested for the member of parliament as an independent candidate but lost to the NRM flag bearer and incumbent, Janet Akech Okorimoe who scored 7, 705 votes and Auma got 7, 608 votes. However, Auma disputed the results alleging vote-rigging and called for a recount. She later filed an election petition which was dismissed by the Kotido Chief Magistrate Emmanuel Seiko with costs on grounds that Auma did not provide substantial evidence. She was listed among the 34 member of parliament of Uganda who have spoken less than five times, and 29 of them belonged to the ruling NRM political party.

== See also ==
- List of members of the ninth Parliament of Uganda
- Iriama Rose
