= Soroti Secondary School =

- Soroti City; Eastern Region; Uganda

Information
- Type: Public
- Established: 1915
- School number: 10706
- Head teacher: Papa Martin Okiria
- Grades: O-Level & A-Level
- Enrollment: 3,799 (2022)

Soroti Secondary School is a government-aided secondary school located in Soroti City, Eastern Uganda. Established in 1915, it is one of the oldest educational institutions in the Teso sub-region. The school offers both Ordinary Level (O-Level) and Advanced Level (A-Level) education and is registered under the Ministry of Education and Sports with the EMIS code 10706.

== History ==
The school was founded in 1915 during the colonial era and has served generations of students from the Teso sub-region and beyond. Over time, it has developed into a prominent public school recognized for its academic and extracurricular achievements.

== Academics ==
Soroti Secondary School follows the national curriculum as set by Uganda’s National Curriculum Development Centre (NCDC). It prepares students for the Uganda Certificate of Education (UCE) and the Uganda Advanced Certificate of Education (UACE). The school has adopted the new lower secondary curriculum introduced in 2020, which emphasizes competence-based learning.

== Facilities ==
The school sits on a spacious campus and offers:

- 41 classrooms
- 6 science laboratories
- 1 library
- 98 latrine stances (for boys and girls)

These facilities support a student population of over 3,799, with 3,153 enrolled in O-Level and 646 in A-Level as of 2022.

== Leadership ==
As of 2023, the school is being led by Mr. Wilfred Oluka Okeriau. As of 2022, the school was headed by Mr. Papa Martin Okiria, who also served as the National Chairman of the Association of Secondary School Headteachers of Uganda (ASSHU).

== Notable alumni ==
- Christine Amongin Aporu – Former Minister of State for Teso Affairs and Member of Parliament for Kumi District.
- Ibrahim Orit – Professional footballer for Vipers SC and Uganda national team.
- Hellen Asamo – Member of Parliament representing persons with disabilities in Eastern Uganda.

== Recent developments ==
In April 2025, Soroti Secondary School recognized its top-performing students in the UCE and UACE national examinations by awarding prizes and commendations. The headteacher praised both students and staff for their efforts and academic discipline.

== Research and challenges ==
Research conducted at the school has explored the impact of poverty on students' academic performance. The studies identified barriers such as poor feeding, lack of school materials, and inadequate parental support as factors that affect learner outcomes.
