= Lowila CD Oketayot =

Ugandan politician

- Born: 24 December 1969 (age 56)
- Citizenship: Ugandan
- Education: Oppette Primary School; Sacred Heart Secondary School, Gulu; Kitgum High School; Bukalasa Agricultural College; Makerere University
- Occupations: Agriculturist, politician, and legislator
- Employer(s): Parliament of Uganda; ZOA Uganda; AIDS Care Education and Training (ACET)Uganda; Uganda Women Parliamentary Association (UWOPA)
- Known for: Politics
- Political party: National Resistance Movement (NRM)

Lowilo CD Oketayot (born 24 December 1969) is a Ugandan professional agriculturist, politician, and legislator. She was a member of parliament of Uganda representing the people of Pader district as district woman representative since 2011 in the 9th and 10th Parliament of Uganda. She is a member of the National Resistance Movement(NRM) Party, the party in political leadership in Uganda under the chairmanship of Yoweri Kaguta Museveni, president of the Republic of Uganda.

== Early life and education ==
Oketayot was born on 24 December 1969. She started her primary education from Oppette Primary School sitting her primary leaving examinations(PLE) in 1982, she studied her O-level education from Sacred Heart Secondary School Gulu where she did her Uganda certificate of education(UCE) in 1986, she enrolled at Kitgum High School for her A-level education and completed her Uganda advanced certificate of education(UACE) in 1990. She pursued a certificate in agriculture from Bukalasa agricultural college in 1994 and a diploma in agriculture thereafter in the same institution in 1996. She joined Makerere University and graduated with a bachelor's degree of science in agriculture in 2007 and added a master's degree in agricultural economics from Makerere University in 2015.

== Career ==
Oketayot has been a Member of Parliament of Uganda since 2011, she was manager agriculture ZOA Uganda from 2009 to 2010 and coordinator agriculture ZOA Uganda from 2008 to 2009. She worked as project officer AIDS care education and training(ACET) Uganda from 1996 to 2001, and worked as the programme officer ACET Uganda from 2001 to 2003.

In the 10th parliament, she serves as the chairperson committee on agriculture animal industry and fisheries. and is a member of the business committee. She also represents the northern region on the Uganda Women Parliamentary Association (UWOPA) executive.
