= Alex Ruhunda =

Ugandan politician

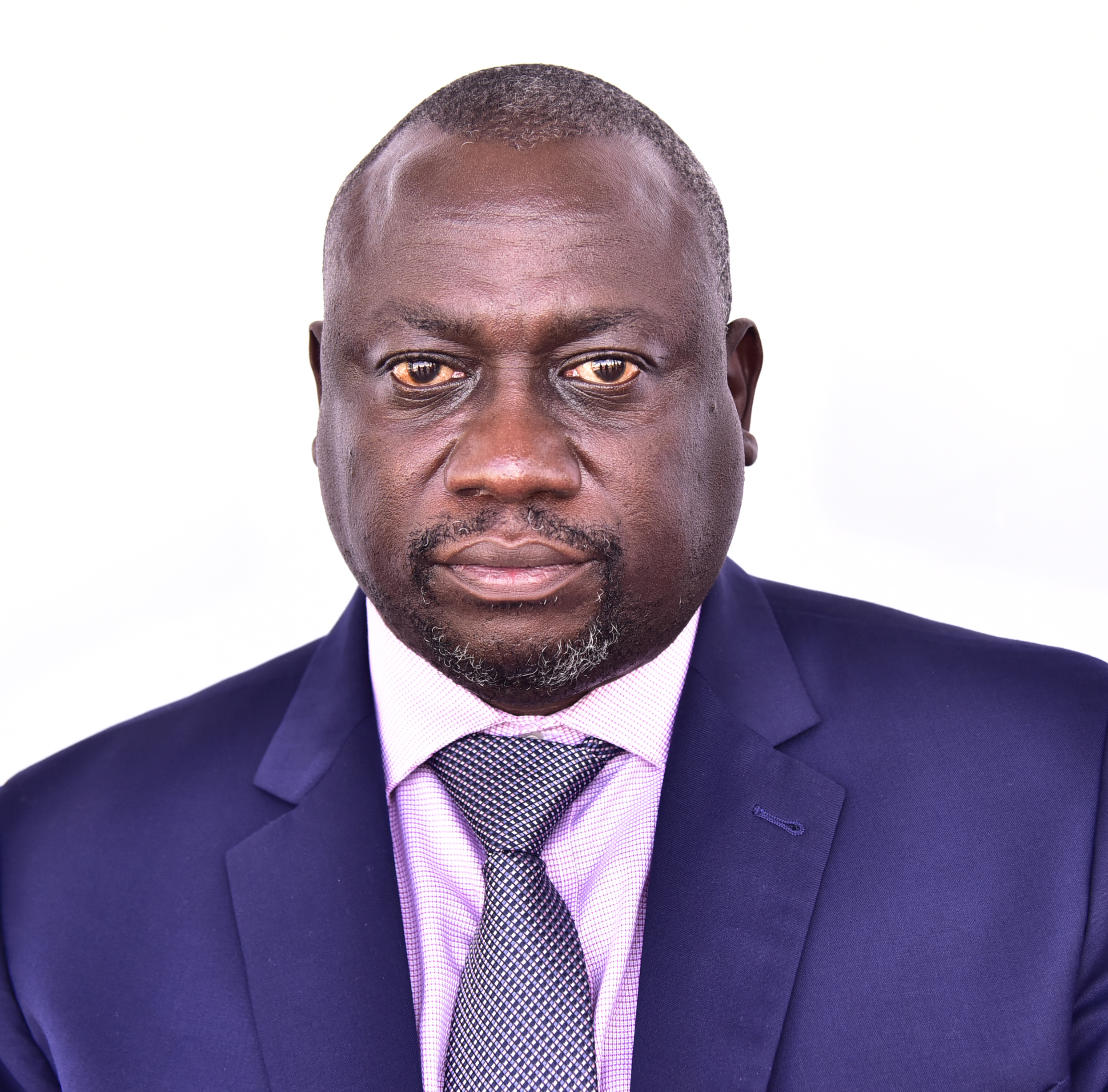

Honorable

Personal details
- Born: Alex Ruhunda; 2 December 1971 (age 54) Kabarole, Uganda
- Citizenship: Uganda
- Education: Makerere University (BSS Political Science) (MA Gender & Development Studies)
- Occupation: Community organizer, politician
- Known for: Community development, politics

Alex Ruhunda (born 2 December 1971) is a Ugandan research consultant, community organizer, businessman and politician.

Ruhunda is the founding chairperson of the Parliamentary Forum for Road Safety, the chairperson of the Rwenzori MPs Forum, the vice chairperson of the Parliamentary Committee on Trade, Tourism and Industry and also a member of the Budget Committee in the 10th Parliament of Uganda.

He was the elected Member of Parliament for Fort Portal Municipality and a representative for NRM, the ruling political party in Uganda in the 11th parliament.

He did not return to the 12th Parliament (2026–2031), having been defeated by independent candidate Ronald Muhenda, who now represents Fort Portal Central Division, Fort Portal City.

In 2007, he was the President of IACD, the International Association for Community Development and is the founder and former Executive Director of Kabarole Research and Resource Centre (KRC), a Ugandan NGO based in Tooro soub-region. He is also a founder member of Mountains of the Moon University, the patron of several Savings and Credit Cooperatives (SACCOs) in Uganda and sits on a number of boards of charitable organizations that include Rotary International among others.

== Early life and education ==
Ruhunda was born in Kabarole District, on 2 December 1971 in a Catholic family. He attended St Peter and Paul Primary School, Kijanju, Fort Portal M/C for his primary school education, City High School, Kampala for his O-level academic qualifications and Namilyango College for his A-Level education.

Ruhunda further advanced to Makerere University for his University education where he graduated in 1996 with a Bachelor of Social Science in Political Science and Public Administration. Still in the same institution of higher education, Ruhunda went on to acquire a Master of Arts in Gender and Development studies in 2000.

== Career ==
Right after graduation in 1996, Ruhunda founded and served as the director and board secretary of Kabarole Research and Resource Centre (KRC), a position he relinquished in 2009. While at the helm of the research organization, he facilitated research programs for MTN Uganda, Shell Uganda and other organizations and served both as the president for IACD in 2007 and as a board member of the global community development organization representing Africa.

He also served as the founding chairperson for Uganda Governance Monitoring Platform (UGMP) and as a patron for Sustainable Agriculture Trainers Network (SATNET), Rwenzori-Anti-Corruption-Coalition (RAC) among other entities. Alex Ruhunda, together with Dennis Mugarra and Joseph Rwabuhinga founded DAJ Communications in 2000, the company in which Ruhunda still serves as the managing director.

In the year 2011, Ruhunda joined elective politics on the NRM ticket and became a member of the 9th Parliament of Uganda representing Fort Portal Municipality. In 2016, he won reelection and continues to serve the same constituency in the 10th Parliament of the Pearl of Africa.

In the 9th Parliament, Ruhunda served on the parliamentary ad hoc committee to investigate the electricity sub sector; the Committee on Natural Resources. In the 10th Parliament, he is the chairperson of the Parliamentary Forum for Road Safety, the chairperson of the Rwenzori MPs Forum, the vice chairperson of the Committee on Trade, Tourism and Industry and is a member of the Budget Committee.

Over the years, Alex Ruhunda has presented numerous papers and delivered keynote addresses to various audiences across the globe and continues to do so.

In 2017 Ruhunda contributed an editorial piece to The Tower Post to voice his opinions regarding an upcoming caucus to remove age limit. He stated, "I hope God will touch the heart of President Yoweri Museveni to avoid the temptation of listening to short term opportunistic individuals that are pushing for the removal of Age limit in our Constitution."

== See also ==
- Kabarole District
