= Kintu Florence =

Ugandan politician

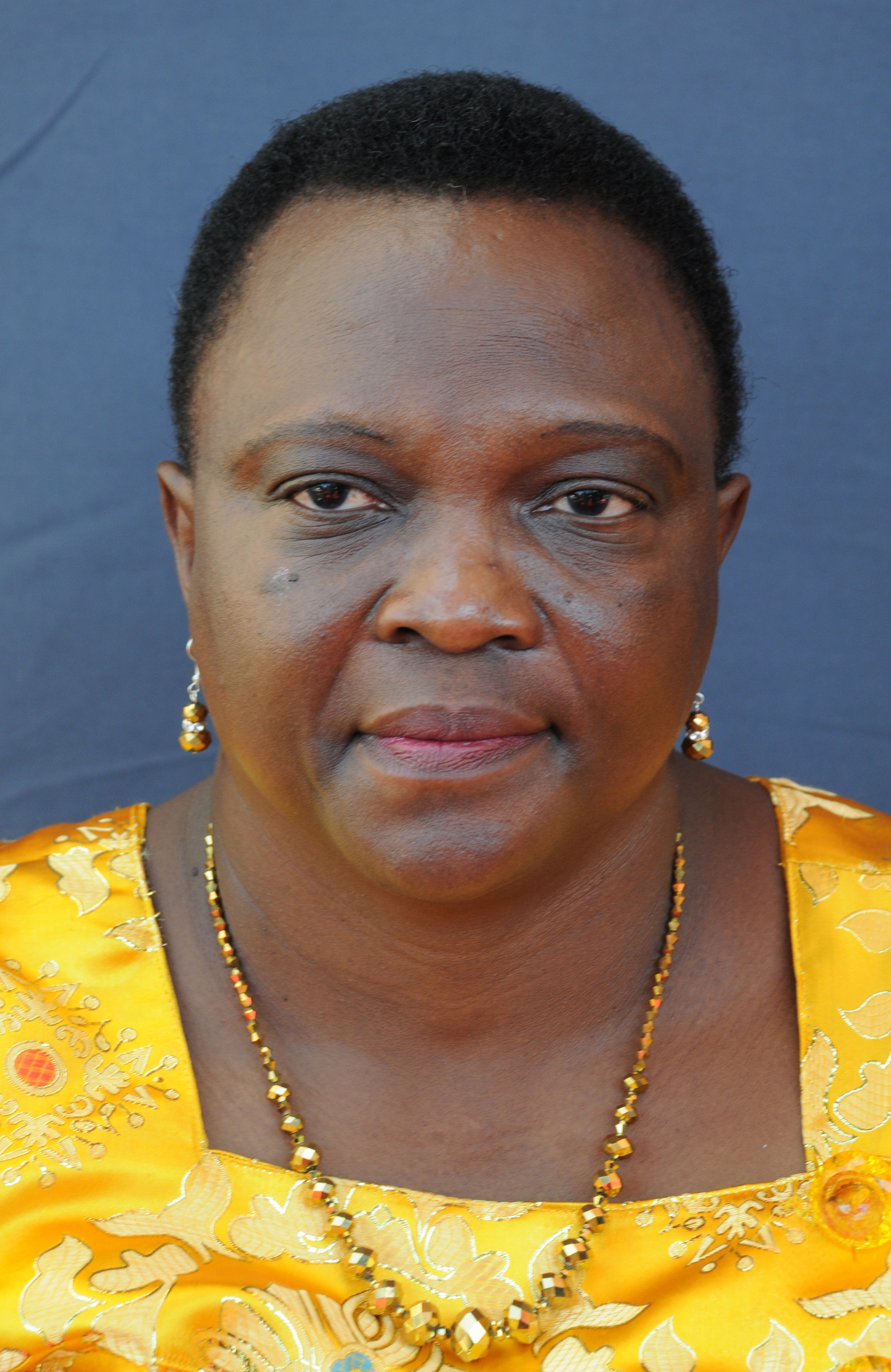
- Kintu Florence
- Born: Kalungu District; April 3, 1960 (age 66)
- Other name: Kintu Florence Tumwine
- Political party: National Resistance Movement

Kintu Florence also known as Kintu Florence Tumwine (born 3 April 1960) is a Ugandan politician. She was a woman member of parliament representative for the National Resistance Movement political party in the ninth Parliament of Uganda, Kalungu District.

== Life before politics ==
Kintu served as the Kalungu District acting chairperson before joining Parliament as its Woman MP and left politics in 2016 to concentrate on other businesses.

== Political life ==
She was among the eight contestants who expressed interest of being in the National Resistance Movement (NRM) party National Vice Chairperson Western Region position. Some of the people who expressed interested included the former Army Spokesperson Col (Rtd) Shaban Bantariza, Dr. Emmanuel Diini Kisembo, former Busongora South MP Boaz Kafunda and others. She contested against Matayo Kyaligonza in the NRM primaries for the position of the vice chairperson after picking nominations forms from the NRM Electoral Commission offices on July 20, 2020. In March 2022, she was accepted as the Local Government and Public Service Committee Chairperson.

Florence who served as the Obundhingiya Bwa Bwamba's cultural institution's minister for tourism and industrial relations, resigned in 2020 to concentrate on peace advocacy in Rwenzori Sub-region after serving as the cultural minister for three years. Kintu addressed her resignation letter to the institution's Prime Minister.

She is the regional chairperson of Rwenzori Women Peace Forum which mainly focuses on districts that were affected by ethnicity clashes.

== Controversy ==
Margaret Ntambaazi and Janat Nassiwa made an election petition against Kintu to the High Court. They alleged that Kintu lacked the Ordinary and Advanced level certificates of education. However, the election petition was dismissed by Justice Elizabeth Musoke on grounds that there was no compelling evidence to show that Kintu's academic papers were forged. While at the high Court, Caleb Alaka, Samuel Muyizzi, Ben Ikilai, and Julius Galisonga represented Ntambaazi and Nassiwa, while Geoffrey Kandeebe represented Kintu and the Electoral Commission. Ntambaazi and Nassiwa vowed to appeal against the ruling. However, Kintu was fully qualifiedand valid to be elected as ruled by Justice Elizabeth Musoke.

== See also ==
- List of members of the ninth Parliament of Uganda
