= Mpiima Dorothy Christine =

Ugandan politician and teacher

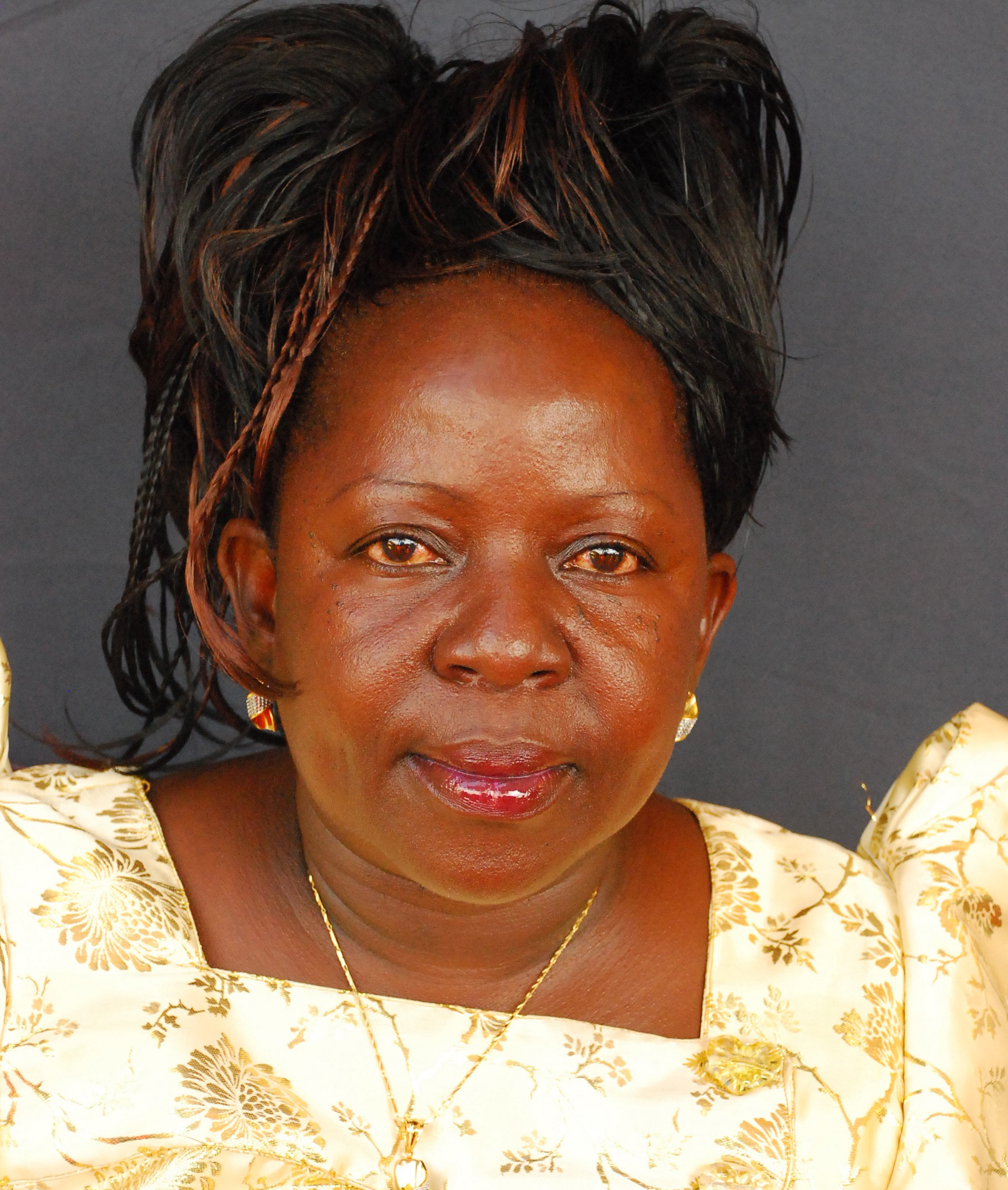
- Born: 22 July 1959 (age 66)
- Citizenship: Ugandan
- Occupation: Politician
- Known for: Politics
- Successor: Judith Babirye
- Political party: National Resistance Movement

Mpiima Dorothy Christine (born 22 July 1959) is a Ugandan Member of Parliament who served in the ninth Parliament of Uganda. She was the National Resistance Movement political party representative of Buikwe District.

== Politics ==
In the ninth parliament, she was the member of parliament for Buikwe District. Christine Kasule Mugerwa filed an election petition against Mpiima Dorothy questioning her academic qualifications and for trading lies throughout her campaigns and bribing voters. When Kasule failed to show up for three times, the petition was dismissed by the former presiding judge, Justice Monica Mugenyi. However, the petition dismissed was later reinstated by the High Court in Jinja.

In 2016, she lost her seat to the tenth Parliament to Judith Babirye. She was a diploma holder teacher before joining the Parliament. Christine was among the nominated National Resistance Movement Candidates in 2020 Primaries on the Electoral Commission released list.

== See also ==
- List of members of the ninth Parliament of Uganda
- Judith Babirye
