= Lydia Chekwel =

Ugandan politician and teacher

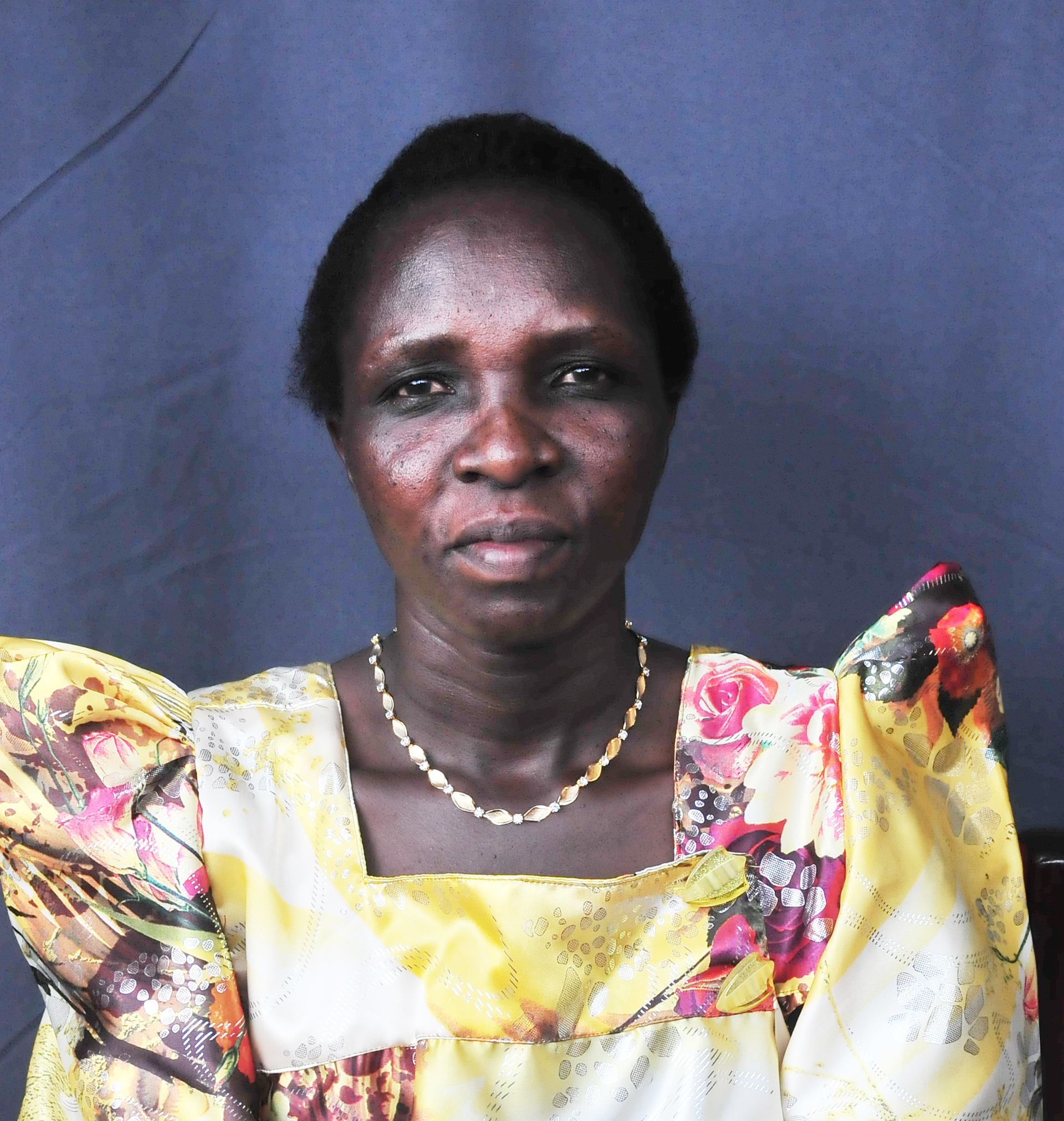
- Born: 16 August 1964 (age 62)
- Citizenship: Ugandan
- Education: Moyok Primary School; St Elizabeth Senior Secondary School, Kidetok; Institute of Teacher Education Kyambogo; Kyambogo University
- Occupations: Politician teacher
- Employer(s): Chemwania Primary School; Kapchorwa Primary Teachers College; Parliament of Uganda
- Known for: Politics
- Successor: Rose Emma Cherukut
- Political party: Independent politician National Resistance Movement
- Spouse: Alfred Barteka

Lydia Chekwel (born 16 August 1964) is a Ugandan politician and teacher who represented Kween District as the district woman member of Parliament in the 9th and 10th Parliament of Uganda. She stood as an independent politician in the 10th Parliament of Uganda. However, in the 9th Parliament, she was affiliated to the National Resistance Movement political party.

== Early life and education ==
Chekwel was born on 16 August 1964. In 1976, she completed her Primary Leaving Examinations from Moyok Primary School. In 1981, she attained a Uganda Advanced Certificate of Education from St Elizabeth Senior Secondary School, Kidetok. In 1988, she was awarded a Primary Teachers' Certificate from Institute of Teacher Education Kyambogo and later returned to Institute of Teacher Education Kyambogo for a Diploma in Teacher Education in 2000. In 2008, she was awarded a bachelor's degree in education from Kyambogo University.

== Career ==
=== Before politics ===
From 1988 to 2000, Chekwel employed as a teacher at Chemwania Primary School and later joined Kapchorwa Primary Teachers College as a tutor from 2000 to 2011.

=== Political career ===
From 2011 to 2021, Chekwel was the Member of Parliament representing Kween District in the Parliament of Uganda. She served on the professional body as a member of Red Cross and a full member of Teachers Association. She also served on additional roles at the Parliament of Uganda on the Committee on Human Rights and Committee on Education and Sports. She is a Member of UWOPA of 10th Parliament.

Lydia Chekwel, the former Woman MP, ( 2011 - 2021) is battling her niece, Rose Emma Cherukut the incumbent, who is popularly known as Pakalast, the former Kapchorwa Resident District Commissioner (RDC) and yet another opponent Sange Jackline for the 2026 general polls. In the 2021 elections, Chekwel decided to run as an independent again after losing to Cherukut in the NRM party primaries. Cherukut got 19,004 votes while Chekwel scored 15,041 votes but didn't succeed.

== Personal life ==
Chekwel is Married to Alfred Barteka, the brother of Andrew Yesho, who is Ms Cherukut's father. Lydia's hobbies are working with women and children, reading papers and adventuring. She has special interests in guidance and counseling women and youth, organizing and helping women and youth, supporting communities construct schools and churches/mosques.

== See also ==
- List of members of the tenth Parliament of Uganda
- List of members of the ninth Parliament of Uganda
- Independent politician
- National Resistance Movement
- Kween District
- Parliament of Uganda
