= Acayo Christine Cwinya =

Ugandan politician

Christine Cwinya-Ai Acayo

Woman Member of Parliament for Nebbi District
- In office 2011–2016

Personal details
- Born: July 31, 1968 (age 57) Jonam, Uganda
- Party: National Resistance Movement (NRM)
- Education: Master's Degree in Education, Planning and Management (Makerere University, 1993)
- Occupation: Politician
- Known for: Woman MP for Nebbi District (9th Parliament); NRM flag bearer for Nebbi District; Advocacy against ignorance, poverty, and disease in Nebbi

Acayo Christine Cwinya also known as Christine Cwinya-Ai Acayo (Born on 31 July 1968) is a Ugandan politician. She served as the Member of Parliament in the ninth Parliament of Uganda representing Nebbi District. She belongs to the ruling National Resistance Movement political party.

== Education ==
She comes from Jonam. In 1993, Acayo graduated from Makerere University with a Master's Degree in Education, Planning and Management.

== Political journey ==
She is the official National Resistance Movement flag bearer for Nebbi District. During her political speech, she urged the need for people to all work together to fight ignorance, poverty and disease in Nebbi, rather than fighting one another.

== See also ==
- List of members of the ninth Parliament of Uganda
