= Baltazar Kasirivu-Atwooki =

Ugandan politician

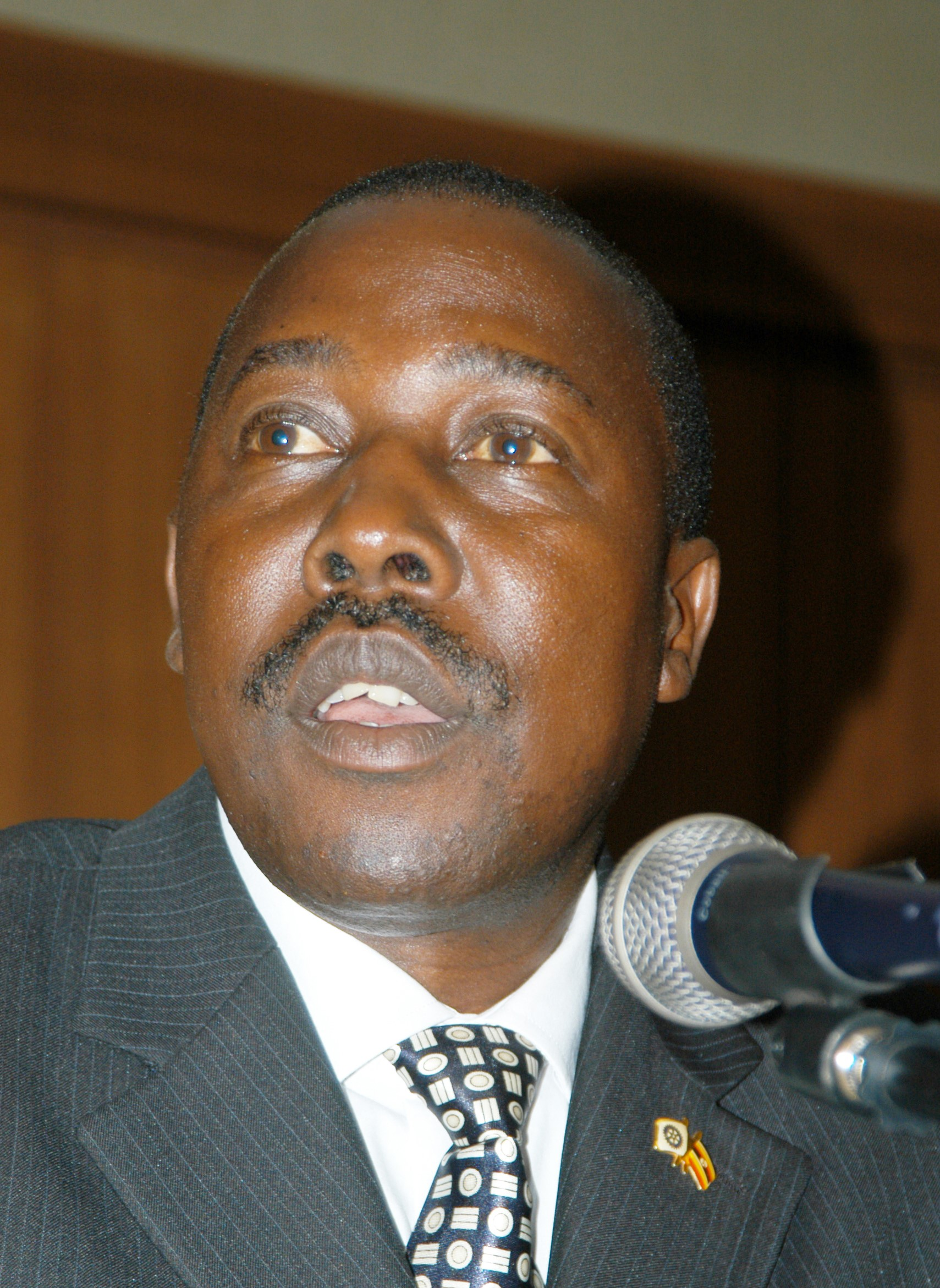
- Kasirivu, Atwoki.jpg
- Born: 5 January 1958 (age 68); Uganda
- Citizenship: Uganda
- Education: Makerere University (Master of Science in Agricultural Extension)
- Occupation: Politician
- Years active: 1984 — present
- Known for: Politics
- Title: State Minister for Economic Monitoring; Cabinet of Uganda

Baltazar Kasirivu-Atwooki, also known as Kasirivu-Atwooki Kyamanywa, is a Ugandan politician. Former State Minister for Economic Monitoring in the Cabinet of Uganda. He was appointed to that position on 6 June 2016, replacing Henry Banyenzaki, who was dropped from the cabinet. He also concurrently serves as the elected Member of Parliament for Bugangaizi County West, in Kibaale District, since 2011.

== Background and education ==
He was born in Kibaale District on 5 January 1958. He holds a Master of Science in Agricultural Extension, obtained in 1997 from Makerere University.

== Career ==
From 1984 until 1992, he served as a Veterinary Officer. He then served as a District Veterinary Officer from 1992 until 1996. He joined the Ugandan parliament in 1996, and has been a member since. From 2006 until 2009, he served as State Minister for Lands and as Senior Presidential Adviser on Land Matters from 2009 until 2011. On 6 June 2016, he was appointed State Minister for Economic Monitoring.

== Personal ==
Baltazar Kasirivu-Atwooki is married.

== See also ==
- Parliament of Uganda
- Cabinet of Uganda
- Kibaale District
