= Oliver Katwesigye Koyekyenga =

Ugandan legislator (born 1975)

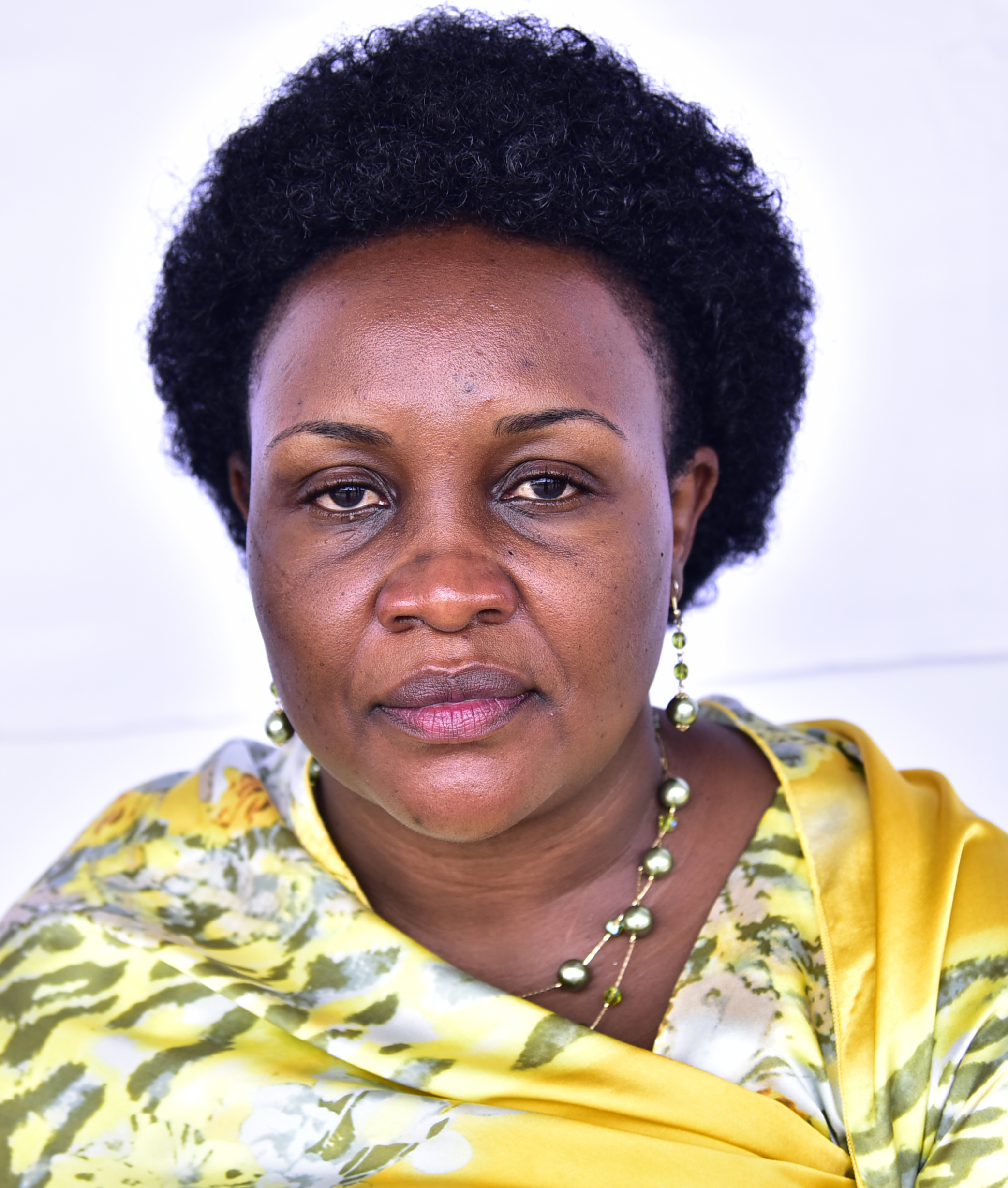
- Born: 14 November 1975 (age 51); Uganda
- Citizenship: Uganda
- Education: Butare Senior Secondary School; Lugogo Hall Centre
- Alma mater: Makerere University (Bachelor in International Business)
- Occupations: Politician, businesswoman
- Years active: 2007–present
- Employer(s): Coyetee; Hoopoe Tours and Travel, Kampala; Buhweju District; Parliament of Uganda
- Known for: Politics
- Title: Member of Parliament; Buhweju District Women's Constituency
- Political party: National Resistance Movement
- Other political affiliations: Independent

Oliver Katwesigye Koyekyenga (born 14 November 1975) is a Ugandan businesswoman and legislator. As of April 2020, she is currently serving as the elected woman representative for Buhweju district in Uganda's tenth parliament. She represented the same constituency in Uganda's ninth parliament as a member of the National Resistance Movement. She then contested as an independent candidate in the 2016 general elections.

She represented Buhweju District on the National Resistance Movement (NRM) ticket as the district woman representative in the 11th parliament of Uganda 2021-2026.

After the defeat in the NRM party primaries, Buhweju District Woman Member of Parliament Hon. Oliver Katwesigye Koyekyenga officially informed her supporters that she would not contest in the 2026 general elections, citing personal and political reasons.

== Early life and education ==
Oliver Katwesigye Koyekyenga was born on 14 November 1975. She achieved her O Levels (Uganda Certificate of Education) at Butare Senior Secondary School in 1995 before sitting for her A Levels (Uganda Advanced Certificate of Education) at the Lugogo Hall Centre in 2006. She also holds a bachelor's degree in International Business from Makerere University which she obtained in 2009.

== Career ==
Between 2007 and 2009, Oliver Katwesigye Koyekyenga worked as an Operations Manager at Coyetee then as a Customer Relations Manager at Hoopoe Tours and Travel, Kampala from 2009 to 2013.

Upon the death in 2013 of Joy Arinaitwe Kariisa, the then woman member of parliament for Buhweju District, Oliver Koyekyenga contested for the seat on the National Resistance Movement ticket achieving victory over Jane Frida Bwiruka.

She contested as an independent candidate in the 2016 general election to retain the seat. She sits on at least 2 Parliamentary committees.
