= Judith Mary Amoit =

Ugandan politician (born 1976)

Woman Representative for Pallisa District

Personal details
- Born: June 26, 1976 (age 50)
- Party: National Resistance Movement (NRM)
- Occupation: Politician
- Known for: Advocacy for women's rights, involvement in NRM caucus decisions

Judith Mary Amoit (born 26 June 1976) is a Ugandan politician who served as the Pallisa district woman representative for the National Resistance Movement (NRM) in the ninth Parliament of Uganda.

== Personal life and career history ==
When she was travelling for the NRM retreat at the Kyankwanzi-based National Leadership Institute, Judith was involved in a serious accident that nearly claimed her life. She was among the NRM caucus members who invoked Kyankwanzi's sole candidate resolution as they accused party leaders of undermining their re-election prospects. She was among the women legislators who sought to amend the Domestic Violence Bill.

== See also ==
- List of members of the Ninth Parliament of Uganda
