= Stella Namoe Nyomera =

Ugandan politician and social scientist (born 1973)

- Born: 25 August 1973 (age 52)
- Citizenship: Ugandan
- Education: Kasimeri Primary School; Kangole Girls S.S.S; Imsat Demtac School of Management, Soroti; Uganda Martyrs University
- Occupations: politician and social scientist
- Employer(s): Parliament of Uganda; Moroto District Local Government; Karamoja Agro Pastoral Development Programme; Lutheran World Federation; Uganda Bureau of Statistics (UBOS)
- Known for: Politics
- Political party: National Resistance Movement

Stella Namoe Nyomera, commonly referred to as Namoe Stella Nyomera (born 25 August 1973) is a female Ugandan politician and social scientist. She belongs to the ruling National Resistance Movement party serving as the District Woman Representative for Napak District in Uganda's 10th Parliament, a positioned she occupied since 2006.

== Education and background ==
Stella Namoe Nyomera did her Primary Leaving Examinations in 1987 from Kasimeri Primary School. In 1991, she completed her Uganda Certificate of Education at Kangole Girls S.S.S and was also offered Uganda Advanced Certificate of Education at the same school in 1994. In the 1998, she enrolled and attained a Diploma in Project Planning and Management from Imsat Demtac School of Management, Soroti. She graduated with a bachelor's degree in arts in democracy and development from Uganda Martyrs University in 2012.

== Work history ==
Her working history is detailed below:

- 2006 to 2021: Member of Parliament, Parliament of Uganda.
- 2002 - 2004: Member District Tender Board, Moroto District Local Government.
- 1998 - 2005: Programme Coordinator, Karamoja Agro Pastoral Development Programme.
- 1997 - 1998: Food Security Supervisor, Lutheran World Federation.
- 1995 - 1996: Accounts Assistant, Moroto District Local Government.
- 1990: Census Enumerator, Uganda Bureau of Statistics (UBOS).

== Personal life and additional information ==
Stella is married and also serves on additional role at the Parliament of Uganda as the Committee on Rules, Privileges and Discipline. Stella is a member of the catholic women council group and comboni missionaries education fund. Namoe Stella Nyomera participated in the MPs sitting on the committee of rules, privileges and discipline who expressed concern over absence of CCTV footage in regard to what transpired between the late Mityana Municipality MP Francis Zaake and Makerere University Vice Chancellor Professor Barnabas Nawangwe. During the meeting, she said that installing cameras in meeting rooms is something Parliament should have done as soon as possible, given the big number of people that come to the House and use the different meeting rooms, being a public institution. She supplemented that it is dangerous not to have those cameras in the committee rooms because this poses a threat to the security of MPs and staff of Parliament since so many people visit the Parliament on a daily basis.

She is mentioned among the Uganda Women Parliamentary Association (UWOPA) Round Table Committees as one of the members on Mental Health.

Stella participated in Napak Women demand for answers from MPs on Land where women councilors in Napak district had their legislators to come out clearly and start their position on the contested Constitutional amendment bill 2017 which seeks to provide article 26 of the constitution to provide for the compulsory land acquisition for government projects.

She was part of team on the move by KCCA in partnership, with the district leaders of Napak and other stakeholders, which was meant to have street children repatriated and resettled with their parents in Napak.

== Other controversies ==
She was mentioned among the 50 female Members of the Parliament of Uganda who have spoken less than five times (poor) in two years, according to the Daily Monitor study of the Parliamentary Hansard that keeps track of all the MPs’ contributions to debates. This study focused on the first and second sessions of the 9th Parliament, which ran from May 2011 to May 2013.

Stella was mentioned among the Members of Parliament, the First Lady and minister for Karamoja Affairs, Janet Museveni was upset with for holding meetings with Prime Minister Amama Mbabazi behind her back, to discuss the plight of the country's poorest sub-region.

== See also ==
- Napak District
- List of members of the ninth Parliament of Uganda
- List of members of the tenth Parliament of Uganda
- Parliament of Uganda
