= Mpabwa Sarah Patience =

Ugandan Politician

- Born: 6 August 1966 (age 60)
- Citizenship: Ugandan
- Occupation: Ugandan

Mpabwa Sarah Patience (born 6 August 1966) was the representative of the Uganda People's Defence Forces (UPDF) and Member of Parliament in the ninth Parliament of Uganda.

== Politics ==
She was the elected UPDF Member of Parliament in to the ninth Parliament. Other elected UPDF MPs in the ninth Parliament included Edward Katumba Wamala, Elly Tumwine Tuhirirwe, David Sejusa, the late Robert Aronda Nyakairima, Charles Angina, Jim Oweyeigire, Julius Oketta Facki, Brigadier Phinehas Manoni Katirima, and Susan Lakot.

== See also ==
- List of members of the ninth Parliament of Uganda
