= Ndamira Catherine Atwikiire =

Ugandan legislator and accountant

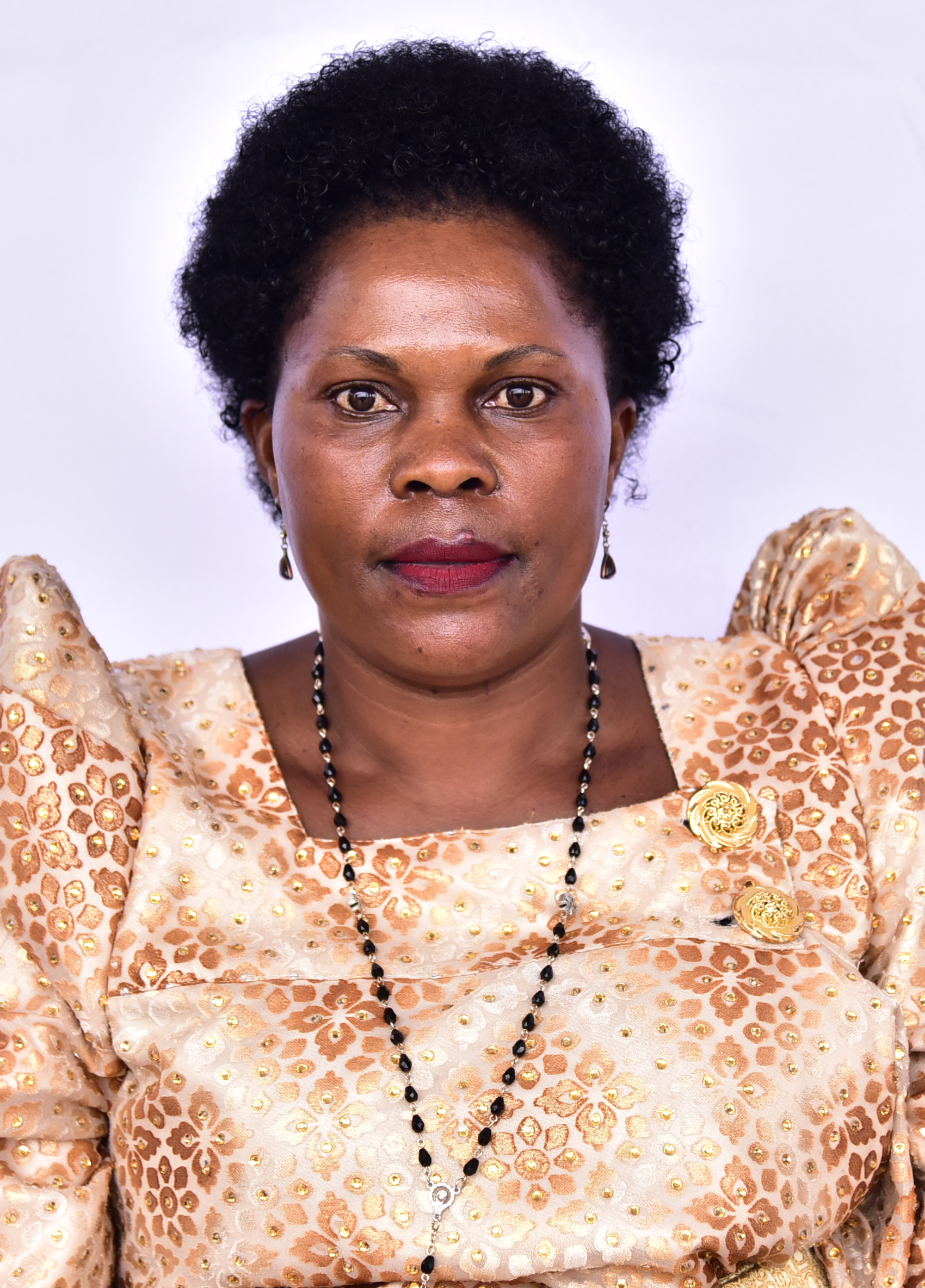
- Born: 13 August 1977 (age 48)
- Citizenship: Uganda
- Occupations: Accountant and Business Woman
- Era: 11th parliament of Uganda as a district woman representative for Kabale District which is the Kigezi sub-region
- Organization(s): Member of the Public Accounts Committee and Committee on Health.
- Notable work: Strengthened local marketing of baskets and mats. Gave tap water to citizens. Implemented youth programs Like SACCOS (Savings and Credit Cooperative Organizations) Provided ambulances to Health Centers and implemented the installation of security lights. Supported games and sport within Kabale District. Promoted and supported education within Kabale District by participating in the fundraising function of the construction of Kagunga Technical School.. Supported the COVID-19 task force with fuel.
- Title: Committee for East African Community Affairs.
- Political party: National Resistance Movement (NRM) political party.
- Movement: Member of the Uganda Parliamentary Forum on Social Protection (UPFSP).

Ndamira Catherine Atwikiire (born 13 August 1977) is an Ugandan accountant, legislator and business woman. She was re-elected into the 11th parliament of Uganda as a district woman representative for Kabale District which is the Kigezi sub-region under the ruling National Resistance Movement (NRM) political party. She was a member of Public Accounts Committee and also a member of committee on Health in the 10th parliament of Uganda. She is also a member of the Uganda Parliamentary Forum on Social Protection (UPFSP). The forum was established to work for social protection, using advocacy, influence, oversight and monitoring, and representation.

== Work experience ==
From 2010 to 2015, she previously worked as the financial administrator for VIDAS Engineering Services Co. Ltd. She was elected as District Representative woman member in 2016. Atwikiire is a member of the Public Accounts Committee and Committee on Health. She was also appointed to the Committee for East African Community Affairs.

Atwakire is a member of the UPFSP. This parliamentary forum works to promote to the wider parliament the policies and legislation which will enhance social protection of vulnerable populations within the country. Towards this aim, members of the forum collectively engage in advocacy of legislation supportive of social protection; promote and undertake the oversight and monitoring of the effects of government policy and administration on social and community development; and participate in a wide array of parliamentary tasks and offices to achieve representation across policy areas.

== Notable works ==
Ndamira Atwakire gave domestic pigs, beans, maize and cabbage to the citizens of Kabale, strengthened local marketing of baskets and mats, gave tap water to citizens, implemented youth programs Like SACCOS (Savings and Credit Cooperative Organizations), provided ambulances to Health Centers and implemented the installation of security lights. She also has supported games and sport within Kabale District. She has promoted and supported education within Kabale District as she participated in the fundraising function of the construction of Kagunga Technical School. She supported the COVID-19 task force with fuel.
