= Gertrude Nakabira =

Ugandan politician (1962–2020)

Member of the Parliament of Uganda for Lwengo District's Women's Representative Seat
- In office 2011–2016
- Preceded by: New constituency
- Succeeded by: Cissy Dionizia Namujju

Personal details
- Born: 1962
- Died: 19 January 2020 (aged 57) Kampala, Uganda
- Resting place: Kibengo, Sembabule District, Uganda
- Spouse: Emmanuel Lubega (m. 1988; died 2020)

Gertrude Nakabira Lubega (1962 – 19 January 2020) was a Ugandan politician who served as Lwengo District's designated woman MP from 2011 until 2016. Before her election, she had a decades-long career in education, culminating in becoming Education Officer of Sembabule District.

== Biography ==
Gertrude Nakabira Lubega was born in 1962. She worked as a teacher and education consultant, spanning thirty-five years in the former career. In 2005, she became Education Officer for Sembabule District, serving until 2010.

In the 2011 Ugandan general election, she was elected for the National Resistance Movement to Lwengo's designated women's representative seat. In 2013, during her twenty-fifth wedding anniversary celebration in Kinoni Town Council, Rwampara district, President Yoweri Museveni praised "her commitment to development and poverty eradication in her constituency."

In the 2016 Ugandan general election, she left the designated women's representative seat to campaign for the Bukoto County South seat. However, during her campaign, she faced accusations of academic credential fraud, including a discrepancy between her declared date of junior education completion and her birth date. Ultimately, she lost to Muyanja Mbabaali and left Parliament.

After years of ill health, she was admitted to Nsambya Hospital, where she died from cancer on 19 January 2020, aged 57. She was later buried in Kibengo, Sembabule District, on 22 January.

Gertrude lived in Lwengo and had an older sister named Irene Nakabira. She married Emmanuel Lubega in 1988.
