= Rosemary Nauwat =

Ugandan Legislator

- Born: 14 November 1968 (age 57)
- Citizenship: Ugandan
- Education: Kalas Girls Primary, Kangole Girls Secondary School, Kyebambe Girls Secondary School, Kaliro National Teachers College, Makerere University
- Occupations: Educator, Teacher and Legislator
- Political party: National Resistance Movement (NRM)

Rosemary Nauwat (born 14 November 1968) is a Ugandan educator and legislator. As of April 2020, she was the elected woman representative for Amudat District in Uganda's tenth parliament. She represented the same constituency in Uganda's ninth parliament as a member of the National Resistance Movement. She then contested the 2016 general elections as an independent candidate.

== Background and education ==
Nauwat did her Primary Leaving Examinations at Kalas Girls Primary in 1980 before achieving her O Levels (Uganda Certificate of Education) at Kangole Girls Secondary School in 1984. She later attended Kyebambe Girls Secondary School for her A Levels (Uganda Advanced Certificate of Education) in 1998 and then enrolled at Kaliro National Teachers College for a diploma in Secondary education obtained in 1993. Subsequently, she attained a Bachelor of Arts degree in Education from Makerere University in 2001.

== Career ==
Between 1994 and 2003, Nauwat worked as a teacher at Moroto High School.

She then contested for the seat of Women's Representative for Amudat District in 2011 on the National Resistance Movement ticket. She stood as an independent candidate in the 2016 General elections to retain the seat. As a female legislator in the tenth parliament of Uganda, she is a member of the Uganda Women Parliamentary Association (UWOPA) and sits on the parliamentary committee for the national economy.

== See also ==
- Amudat District
- Tenth Parliament of Uganda
