= Iriama Rose =

Ugandan politician

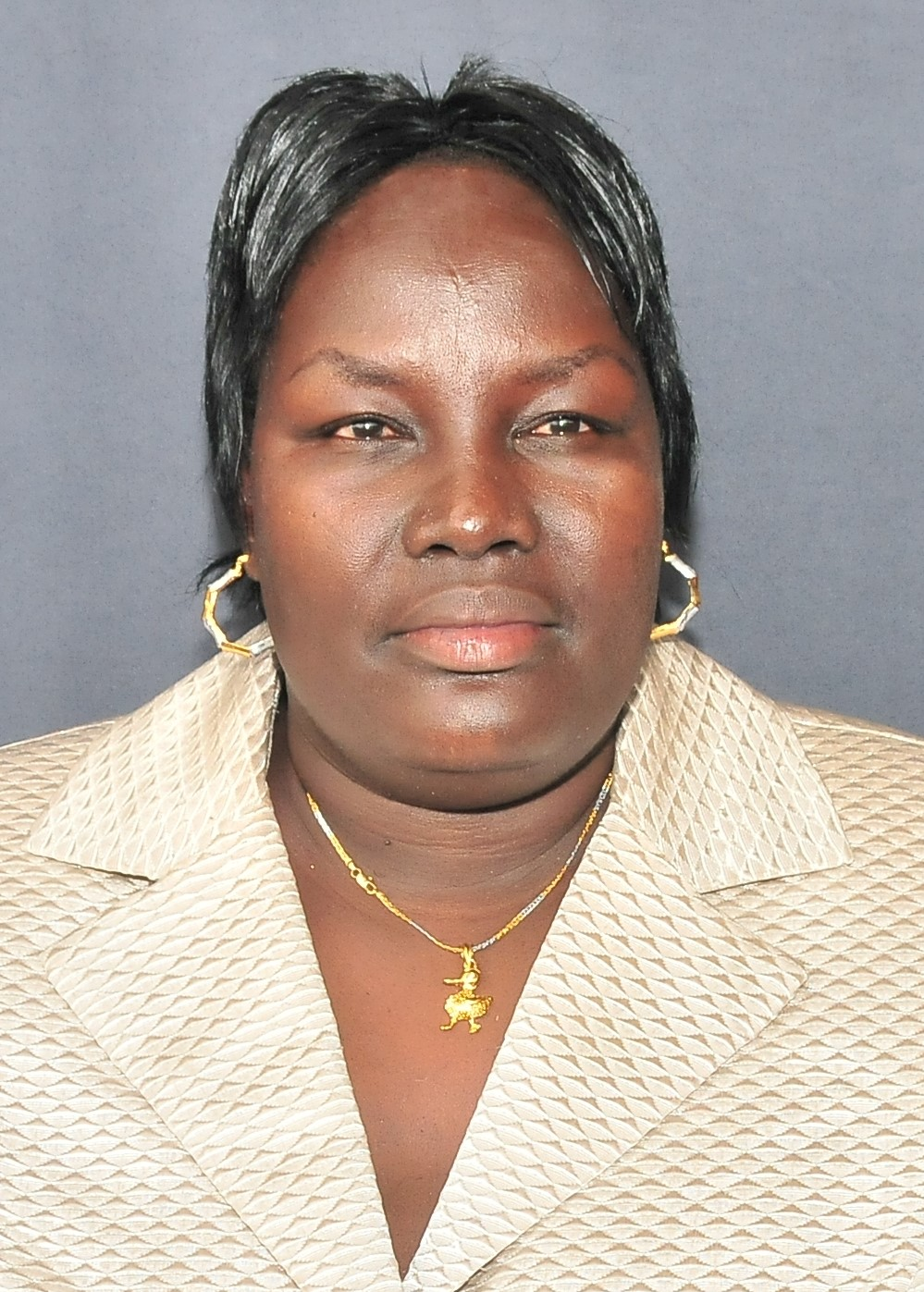
- Born: 5 January 1967 (age 59)
- Citizenship: Ugandan
- Occupation: Politician
- Years active: 2006-2016
- Political party: Independent candidate

Iriama Rose (born 5 January 1967) is a Ugandan politician. She was the Member of Parliament in the eighth and ninth Parliament of Uganda representing Nakapiripirit District as an Independent candidate.

== Political life ==
She served in the eighth and ninth Parliament of Uganda as the Nakapiripirit District Member of Parliament. While serving in the ninth Parliament, she was voted among the MPs who have spoken less than fives times at the parliament according to the Daily Monitor study conducted by the Hansard on the official record of Parliament. The study found out that 34 Members of Parliament have spoken less than five times on the floor of the Parliament House in the last two years while another 105 MPs have contributed less than 15 times to debates.

During her political office in 2007, she advised Karimojong warriors to comply with the government's on-going disarmament exercise to champion development in the region. She was also against the killing of innocent people, especially women by armed gangs in the region which has affected development in Karamoja. Iriama was among the MPs who decided to meet the former Prime Minister, Amama Mbabazi who gave them time when the First Lady and minister for Karamoja Affairs, Janet Museveni, refused to meet the Members of Parliament from Karamoja sub-region over discussion of their sub region which is Uganda's poorest sub-region. The MPs who met the former Prime Minister included Rose Akello (Kaabong), Modest Juliana Auma (Abim), Rose Iriama (Nakapiripirit) and Margaret Iriama (Moroto). After her political office in the ninth Parliament, she jokingly threatened to raid President Museveni’s cows in case her constituents were not compensated for the livestock they had lost during disarmament. In 2009, Iriama told The East African about her perspectives of thinking that Janet Museveni would bring a lot of development in the region just like the church in the past. She was among the MP who filed 118 election petitions to be heard in different courts across the country following the February 18 general elections.

== See also ==
- List of members of the eighth Parliament of Uganda
- List of members of the ninth Parliament of Uganda
