= Bako Christine Abia =

Ugandan politician

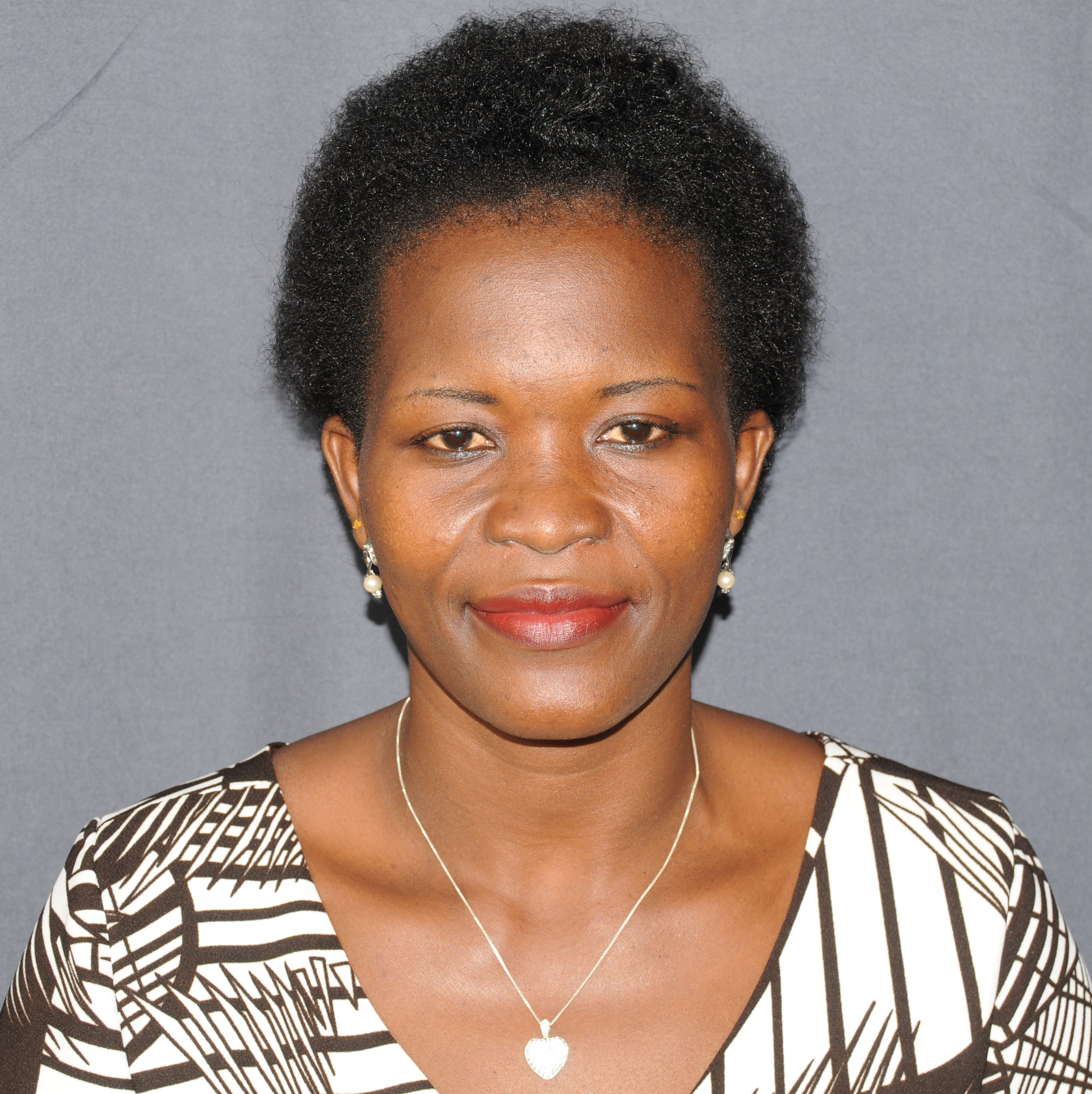
- Born: 29 June 1977 (age 49)
- Citizenship: Ugandan
- Occupation: Politician
- Employer: Parliament of Uganda
- Known for: Politics
- Political party: Forum for Democratic Change

Bako Christine Abia (born 29 June 1977) is a Ugandan politician and she was the Arua District woman Member of Parliament in the eighth and ninth Parliament of Uganda. She belongs to the Forum for Democratic Change political party.

== Political career and controversy ==
She was the Member of Parliament in the ninth Parliament of Uganda. In 2010, she exchanged words with the Minister for Disaster Preparedness and Refugees, Tarsis Kabwegyere at the commissioning of the refurbished Arua Hospital Out Patient's Ward over limited supply of medicines. As a result of the elections for the tenth Parliament of Uganda, a group of MPs from West Nile and other parts of Northern Uganda were joined by the State Minister of Internal Affairs to celebrate former Terego County MP, Kasiano Wadri Ezati's failure to join the tenth Parliament. She was among the Members of Parliament who didn't make it to the tenth Parliament. Other MPs, who similarly didn't go back to the tenth Parliament were; the former Arua Woman representative in Parliament, Alex Onzima, the former State Minister for Local government and FDC – NRM leaning Maracha MP, Sam Okuonzi (Vurra), Martin Drito (Madi Okollo), Ahmed Awongo (Koboko), Ruth Lematia (Maracha Woman), Noah Acile (Yumbe), Christine Acayo (Nebbi Woman), Hudah Oleru (Yumbe Woman) and Ann Awuru (Moyo Woman) etc.,

In 2010, Christine fought with the Local Council 5 chairman, Richard Adam Ferua during council meeting that was held in Arua municipality to address the wrangles between the municipal law enforcement officers and illegal vendors who were accused of beating up law enforcement officers with metal bars on the orders of the resident district commissioner, Ibrahim Abiriga. While at the ninth Parliament, she was mentioned among the 34 who have spoken less than five times, and of which 29 of them belong to the ruling National Resistance Movement party. She is the National Treasurer for Alliance for National Transformation.

== See also ==
- List of members of the eighth Parliament of Uganda
- List of members of the ninth Parliament of Uganda
- Mourine Osoru
- Alliance for National Transformation
