= Gabriel Ajedra Aridru =

Ugandan civil engineer and politician

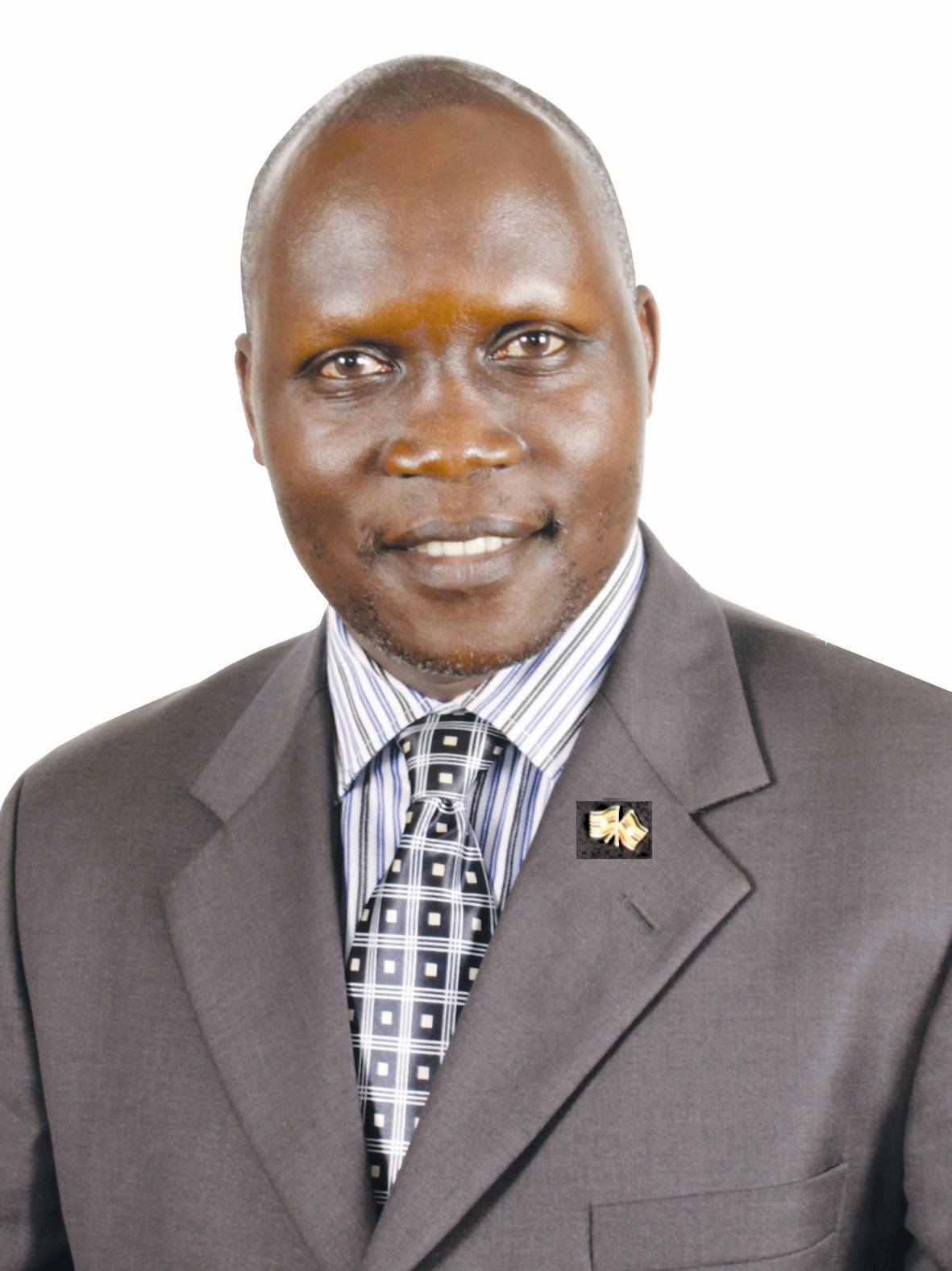
- Born: 30 August 1962 (age 64); Uganda
- Education: Makerere University (Bachelor of Science in Civil Engineering); University of New Brunswick (Master of Science in Civil Engineering & Doctor of Philosophy in Civil Engineering)
- Occupations: Civil engineer; politician
- Years active: 1990—present

Gabriel Gadison Ajedra Aridru is a Ugandan civil engineer and politician. He was the State Minister of Finance for General Duties in the Cabinet of Uganda, from 6 June 2016 until 3 May 2021. Prior to that, from 12 August 2012, until 6 June 2016, he served as the State Minister of Finance for Investments. In the cabinet reshuffle of 24 May 2013, and that of 1 March 2015, he retained his cabinet post. He also served as the elected member of parliament for Arua Municipality, Arua District, until May 2021.

== Early life and education ==
Aridru was born in Arua District on 30 August 1962. He studied at Makerere University, graduating in 1989 with the degree of Bachelor of Science in Civil Engineering. He pursued further studies in Canada, obtaining the degree of Master of Science in Civil Engineering from the University of New Brunswick in 1992. In 1997, he was awarded the degree of Doctor of Philosophy in Civil Engineering.

== Career ==
Following his postgraduate studies in Canada, he was appointed Lecturer in Civil Engineering at the University of Botswana. He later taught, as a lecturer in Civil Engineering at the Development University of Bahamas. Then he returned to Uganda and worked as an engineer for the National Water and Sewerage Corporation. For a period of time, he served as the Chief Project Coordinator and Advisor on Infrastructure for the Government of Botswana. In 2011, he successfully contested for the parliamentary seat of Arua Municipality, on the National Resistance Movement political party ticket. In August 2012, he was appointed State Minister of Finance, responsible for Investments. On 6 June 2016, he was named as State Minister for Investments.

== Other considerations ==
Dr. Aridru was previously married to Josephine Aridru from Arua. He is a follower of the Anglican faith. He is now married to Elizabeth Kamuhanda of Kabale.

== See also ==
- Parliament of Uganda
- Cabinet of Uganda
- Government of Uganda
