= Sharon Balmoi Laker =

Ugandan politician

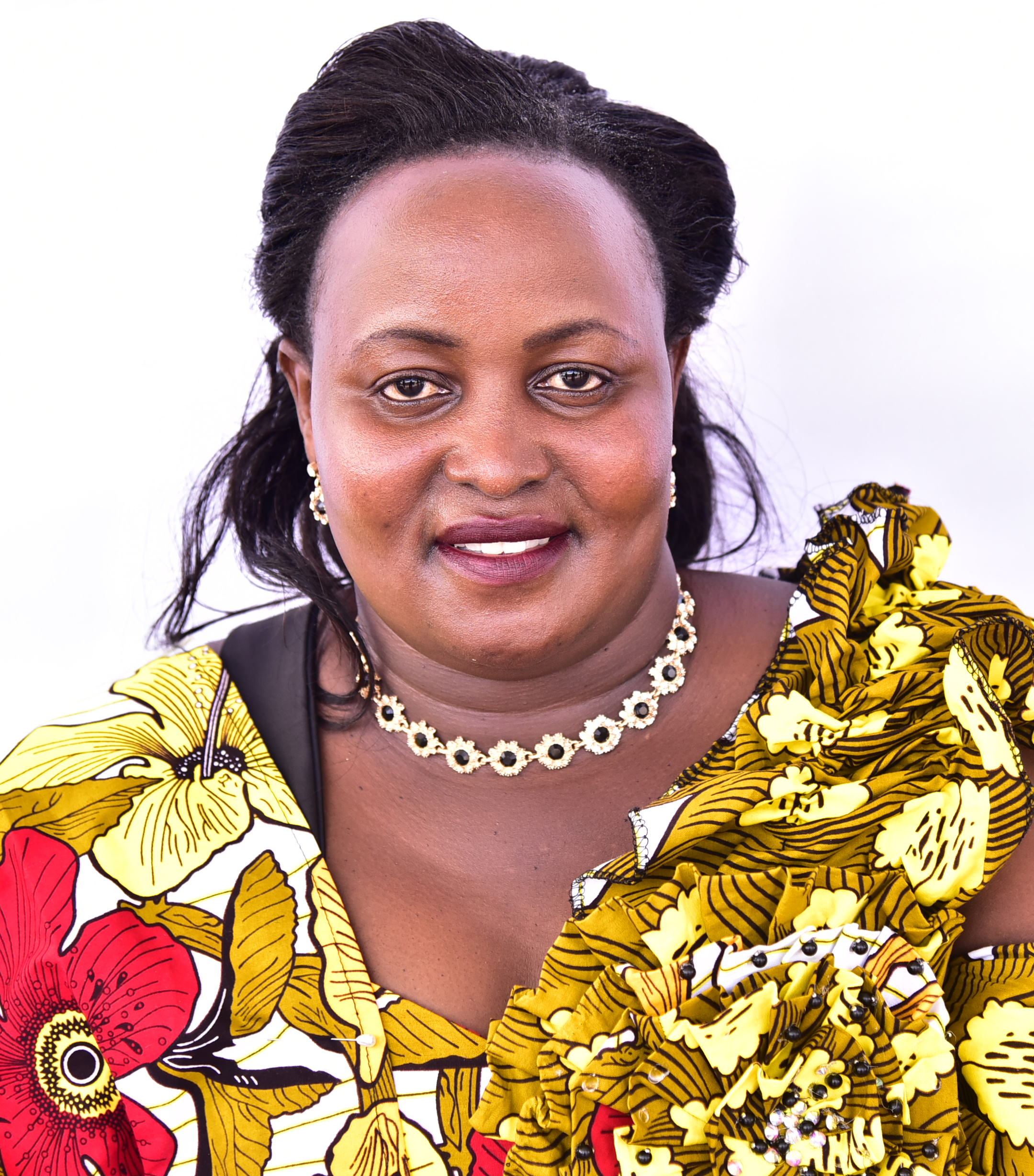

Woman Member of Parliament for Gulu District
- In office 2021–present
- Constituency: Gulu District

Personal details
- Born: Uganda
- Party: National Resistance Movement
- Occupation: Politician
- Profession: Legislator
- Known for: Member of Parliament for Gulu District

Sharon Balmoi Laker is a Ugandan politician. She is the district woman representative of Gulu district under the National Resistance Movement political party at the eleventh Parliament of Uganda.

== Work experience ==
She addressed the school girls of Gwengdiya Primary School in Gulu district and encouraged them to stay away from early pregnancy. She was among the section of lawmakers from Acholi region who asked the government to provide support to family members of Kamdini road victims who got into accidents and for others who sustained injuries due to poor roads.

== Political Career ==
She was among the Acholi Parliamentary Group (APG) and Ker Kwaro Acholi who called for the release of seven residents of Apaa who were arrested and detained in Adjumani district.

In 2021, she was elected as the Parish Development representative of the Acholi Parliamentary Group. Acholi Parliamentary Group was established in 1989. It was one of the first regional parliamentary groups formed in the National Resistance Council, an interim parliament created by the National Resistance Movement-NRM government. It was formed at a time when the Acholi region battled the brunt of various insurgencies including the Lord's Resistance Army-LRA rebel insurgency led by Joseph Kony.

Sharon has served her constituents by providing career guidance and canceling for girls on early marriages in her community. She has monitors government programs in her community to promote development and community growth through programs like Parish Development Model (PDM).

== Members of Parliament from Acholi Sub Region ==
- Anthony Akol
- Phillip Okin Ojara
- Hillary Onek Obaloker
- Ricky Anywar
- John Amos Okot
- Lillian Aber
- Beatrice Akori
- Tonny Awany Nwoya
- Margaret Lamwaka Odwar
- Geoffrey Okello Nwoya
- Betty Aol Ocan
- Simon Wokorach
- Judith Peace Acan
- David Lagen Atuka
- Aciro Menya
