= Nanyondo Birungi Carolyn =

Ugandan politician

- Born: 1975 August 12; Kalangala District
- Education: Nkumba University

Nanyondo Birungi Carolyn (born 12 August 1975) is a Ugandan politician and she was the woman representative member of parliament for Kalangala District in the 9th parliament.

== Background and education ==
She was born from Kalangala District and she started school from St Theresa, Gayaza Girls and she attained her Primary Leaving Examinations (PLE) in 1989 then to Modern secondary school, Kampala for her Uganda Certificate of Education (UCE) in 2006 there after Sharing Hall Centre, Nsambya for her Uganda Advanced Certificate of Education (UACE) in 2009. She attained a Bachelor of Public Administration and Management from Nkumba University in 2014.

== Career and politics ==
She joined politics in 1996 when she was elected to be the Female Youth Councillor at the district then she became the Secretary for Finance and Production still at Kalangala District Local Government in 2006, then in 2008 a Secretary for Health and LC V Councillor in 2011 Kyamuswa Sub-county, Kalangala District. She was the Secretary for Works and Member, Executive Committee Kalangala District Local Government. Then in 2011 she was elected to parliament as the woman representative for Kalangala district.
