= Lanyero Sarah Ochieng =

Ugandan politician

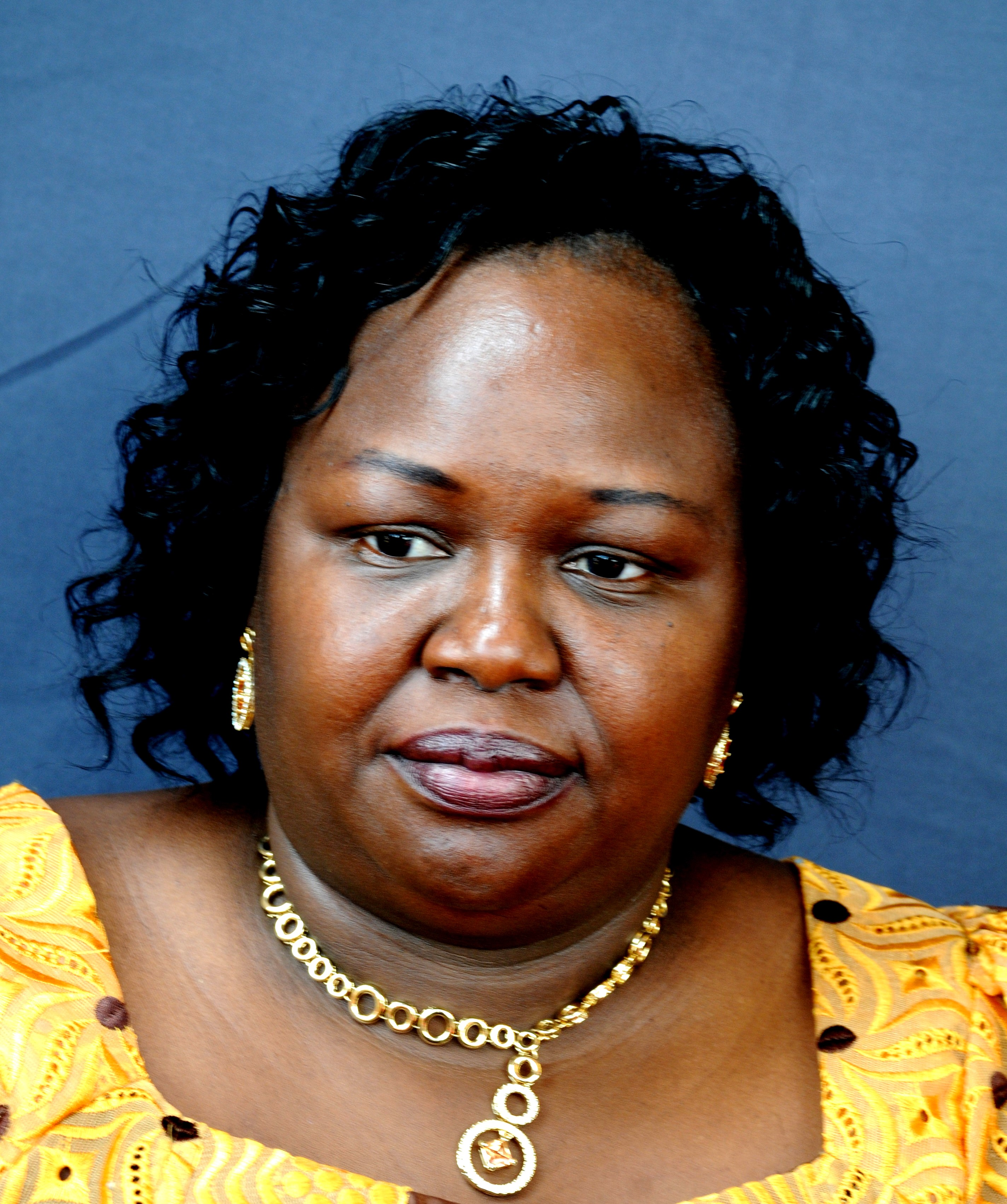
- Lakot Susan
- Other name: Sarah Ochieng Lanyero
- Political party: National Resistance Movement

Lanyero Sarah Ochieng also known as Sarah Ochieng Lanyero (born on 14 July 1967) is a Ugandan Politician. She was the Member of Parliament in the ninth Parliament of Uganda representing Lamwo District under the National Resistance Movement political party.

== Politics ==
She served as the MP for the ninth Parliament of Lamwo District. She was among the nominated candidates in the 2020 primaries according to the National Resistance Movement (NRM) Electoral Commission released list.

== See also ==
- List of members of the ninth Parliament of Uganda
