= Michael Mawanda =

Ugandan politician

Michael Maranga Mawanda
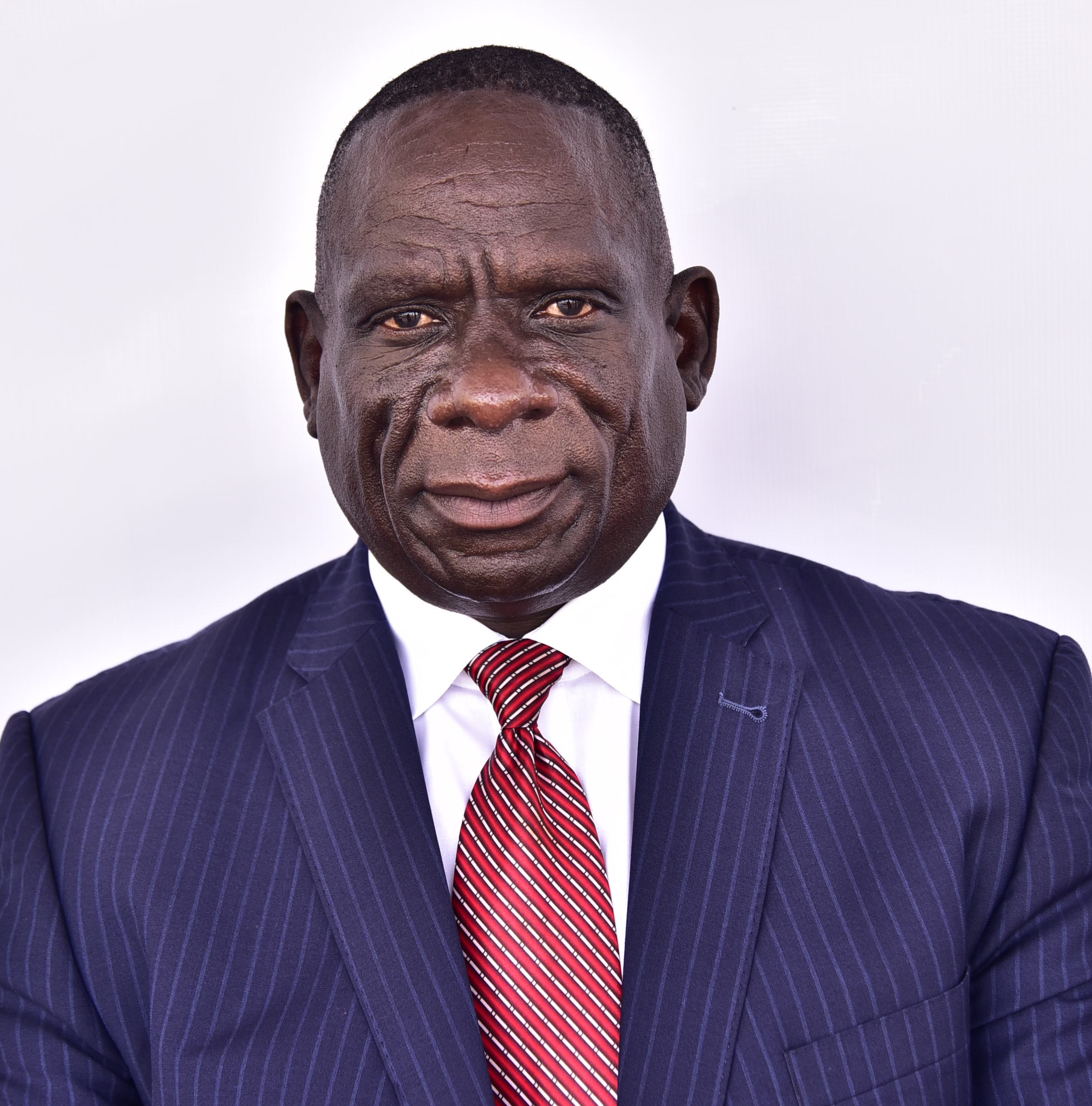
- Born: 23 July 1967 (age 59); Bushenyi
- Citizenship: Uganda
- Occupations: Businessman, politician
- Years active: 1992–present
- Known for: Politics

Michael Maranga Mawanda (born 23 July 1967) is a Ugandan businessman, economist and politician. He served as a member of parliament for Igara East Bushenyi District in the 9th Parliament (2011–2016) and in the 10th Parliament (2017–2021) after he won 2017 Igara County East by-election as an Independent candidate. and the current vice chairperson at Kampala International University Uganda.

In the 11th parliament, he was reelected as a member of parliament for Igara East county for the term 2021-2026.

In the 12th parliament, he was elected as a member of parliament for Igara East County on the National Resistance Movement (NRM) ticket for the term 2026-2031.

== Early life and education ==
Born in Bushenyi District on 23 July 1967. Mawanda attended Masheruka Secondary School for his O-Level Education and St. Francis Secondary School for his A-Level Education, attaining his Uganda Certificate of Education in 1985 and his Uganda Advanced Certificate of Education in 1989.

Mawanda attained his Degree Bachelor of Arts at Makerere University in 1993.

== Career and politics ==
Mawanda's political service started in 2011 as a member of parliament for Igara County East as a National Resistance Movement member for the term 2011–2016. In 2016 Mawanda contested as an independent and won, becoming a member of the 10th Parliament of Uganda representing Igara County East, Bushenyi District term 2017–2020.

He serves as a member of the parliamentary Committee on National Economy in the perliamentary term 2026-2031

== Corruption investigations and legal proceedings ==
Throughout his political career, Mawanda has been associated with a number of investigations, criminal proceedings and public controversies relating to alleged corruption, fraud and abuse of public funds. The matters have included allegations arising from an extortion case in India in 2013 and later investigations into the disbursement of cooperative compensation funds in Uganda beginning in 2024.

In April 2013, Mawanda was arrested in Mumbai, India, together with former minister Isaac Musumba and businessman Yakuba Mathai, over allegations that they had attempted to extort money from directors of Videocon. Ugandan and Indian media reports gave the alleged demand as approximately US$20 million, or about Shs50 billion to Shs53 billion. The allegations related to a dispute involving an earlier mining investment. Following the arrest, Indian authorities reportedly declined to immediately release the Ugandan officials despite diplomatic efforts by Uganda. Daily Monitor reported that Mawanda and Musumba remained under hotel arrest in India while the matter was being handled by Indian authorities.

Mawanda was in June 2024 also named in reports concerning investigations into funds meant for cooperatives. According to a Daily Monitor police had summoned him alongside Elgon County MP Ignatius Mudimi Wamakuyu over a Shs146 billion cooperatives matter. He was later detained at Nateete Police Station but reports described the wider inquiry as involving Shs164 billion meant for cooperatives or war veterans. Security officers searched Mawanda's Kololo home after his arrest in relation to the same corruption investigation. On 21 June 2024, Mawanda, Paul Akamba, Ignatius Mudimi Wamakuyu and lawyer Julius Kirya Taitankoko were presented before the Anti-Corruption Court and were charged over alleged theft or diversion of cooperative compensation funds, with the amounts reported as Shs3.4 billion and Shs7.3 billion in different accounts. They were remanded to Luzira Prison.

In July 2024, Mawanda's profile was published by Daily Monitor, discussing his political career and the criminal proceedings and describing the cooperatives case as one of several controversies he had faced. The paper also questioned whether he was a political prisoner, while The Observer criticised the broader handling of corruption allegations in Uganda with reference to Mawanda's cooperatives case.

== Professional body ==
Mawanda is a full member in the Oil and Gas Service Providers.
