= Byarugaba Grace Isingoma =

Ugandan politician (born 1962)

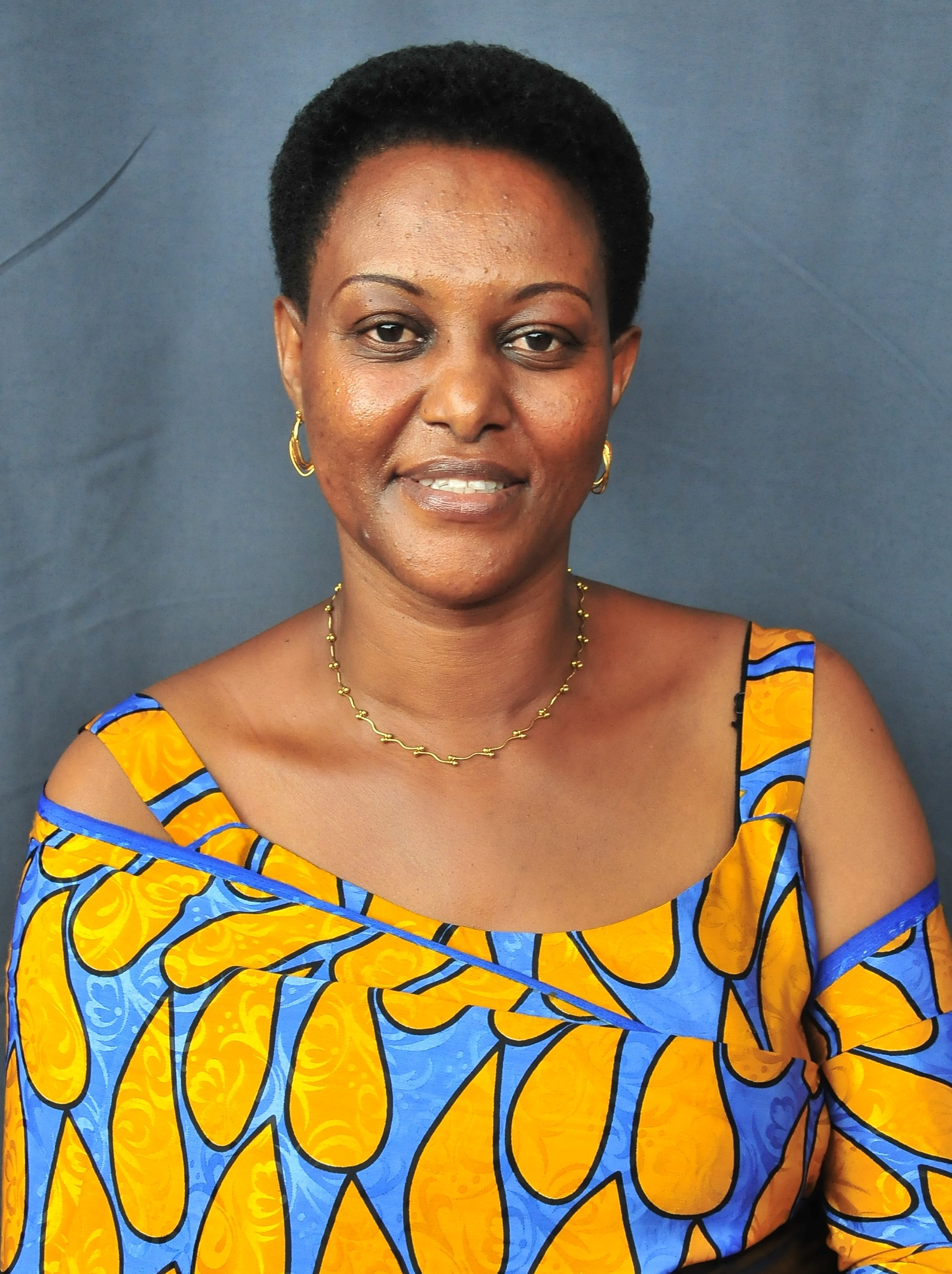
- Born: 15 July 1962 (age 63)
- Citizenship: Ugandan
- Known for: Politics

Byarugaba Grace Isingoma (born 15 July 1962) is a Ugandan politician who served in the ninth Parliament of Uganda under the National Resistance Movement political party representing Isingiro District.

== Politics ==
She was the Public Service and Local Government Committee who chaired the meeting and recommended to parliament that the report of the committee of public service and local government be rejected considering the Lord Mayor Lukwago's petition afresh. She served as the Natural Resources committee who was among the MPs who threatened to block the budget for the Ministry of Water and Environment unless the ban on polythene bags, locally known as (Kavera) is implemented. This was during the analysing ministerial policy statement for 2011/2012 financial year that was held at the Parliament. Members of the Parliament (MPs) noted with concern the damage the continued use of Kavera are causing to the environment.

== See also ==
- List of members of the ninth Parliament of Uganda
- Justine Ayebazibwe
- Parliament of Uganda
- National Resistance Movement
