= Henry Banyenzaki =

Ugandan politician

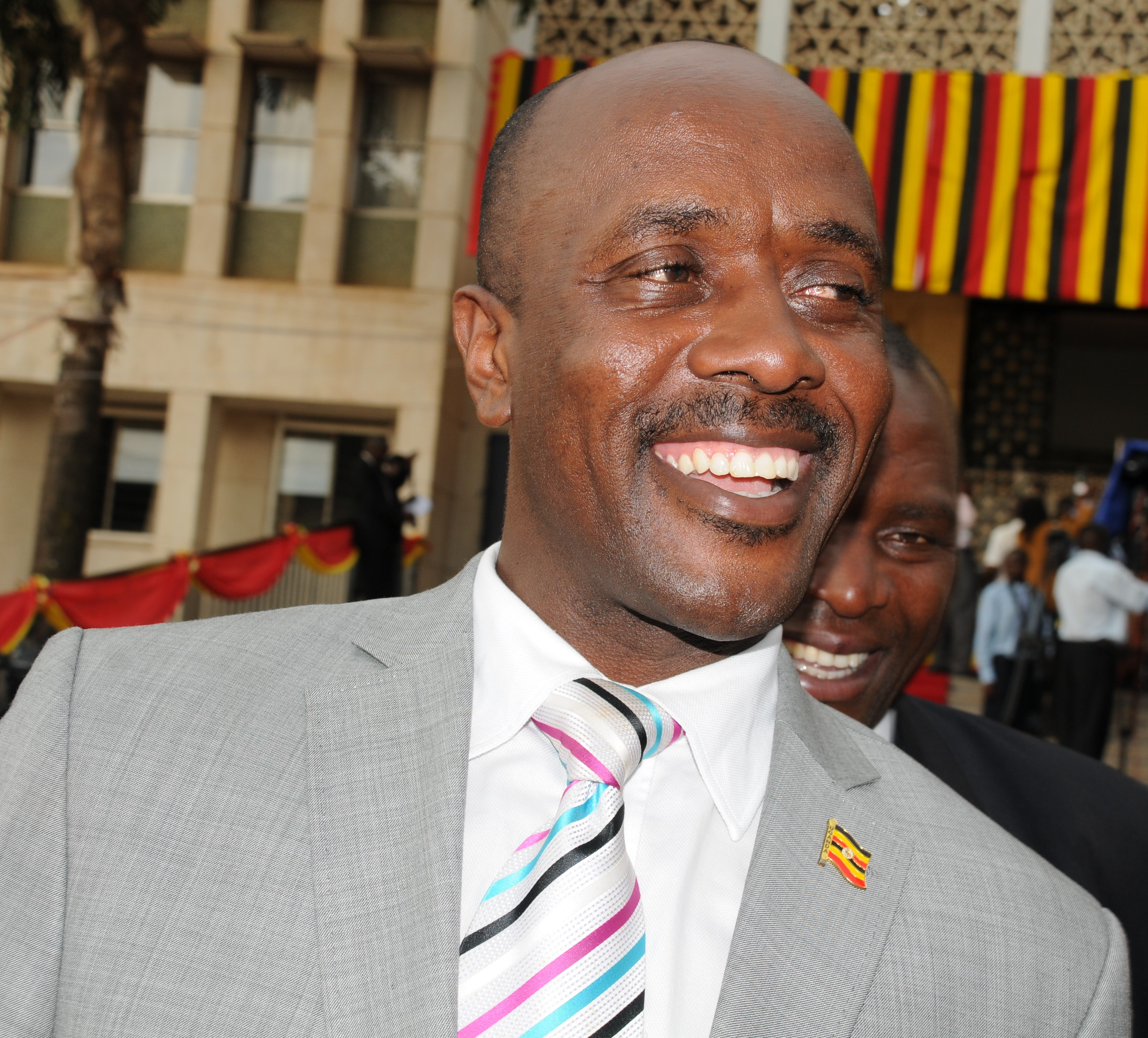
- Born: 27 March 1967 (age 59); Uganda
- Education: Makerere University (Diploma in Environmental Studies) (Bachelor of Arts in social sciences) (Master of Arts in planning & management); Association of Professional Accountancy Studies (Diploma in Accounting); The World Bank (Certificate in Microfinance for Non Specialists)
- Occupation: Politician
- Years active: since 1988
- Known for: Politics
- Title: State Minister for Economic Monitoring in the Office of the President

Henry Banyenzaki is a Ugandan politician who served as the elected Member of Parliament for Rubanda County West, Kabale District. From 2011 to 2016, he served as the State Minister for Economic Monitoring in the Office of the President in the Cabinet of Uganda.

== Background and educations ==
He was born in Kabale District on 27 March 1967. He attended local primary and secondary schools. In 1988, he received a Diploma in Environmental Studies from Makerere University. In 1991, he was awarded a Bachelor of Arts in social sciences. In 2005, he received a Master of Arts degree in planning & management, also from Makerere University. Banyenzaki also received a Diploma in Accounting from the Association of Professional Accountancy Studies in 1988. His Certificate in Microfinance for Non Specialists was obtained in 2003 from the World Bank Group.

== Career ==
From 1995 to 1997, he worked as an assistant marketing and sales manager at Uganda Aluminium Limited, a private enterprise in Kampala, Uganda's capital city. In 1998, he was promoted to marketing manager at the same company. From 2000 until 2001, he worked as the business development manager at Tororo Cement Limited. In 2001, he won the parliamentary seat of Rubanda County West, in Kabale District, and was re-elected in 2006, 2011 and 2016.

He was appointed as State Minister for Economic Monitoring in the Office of the President on 27 May 2011. In the cabinet reshuffle of 1 March 2015, he retained his cabinet post before being replaced in June 2016.

He is a member of the National Resistance Movement political party.

== Personal life ==
He was married on 3 August 1996 and has 3 children with has wife.

== See also ==
- Kabale
- Government of Uganda
