= Christine Amongin Aporu =

Ugandan educator and politician

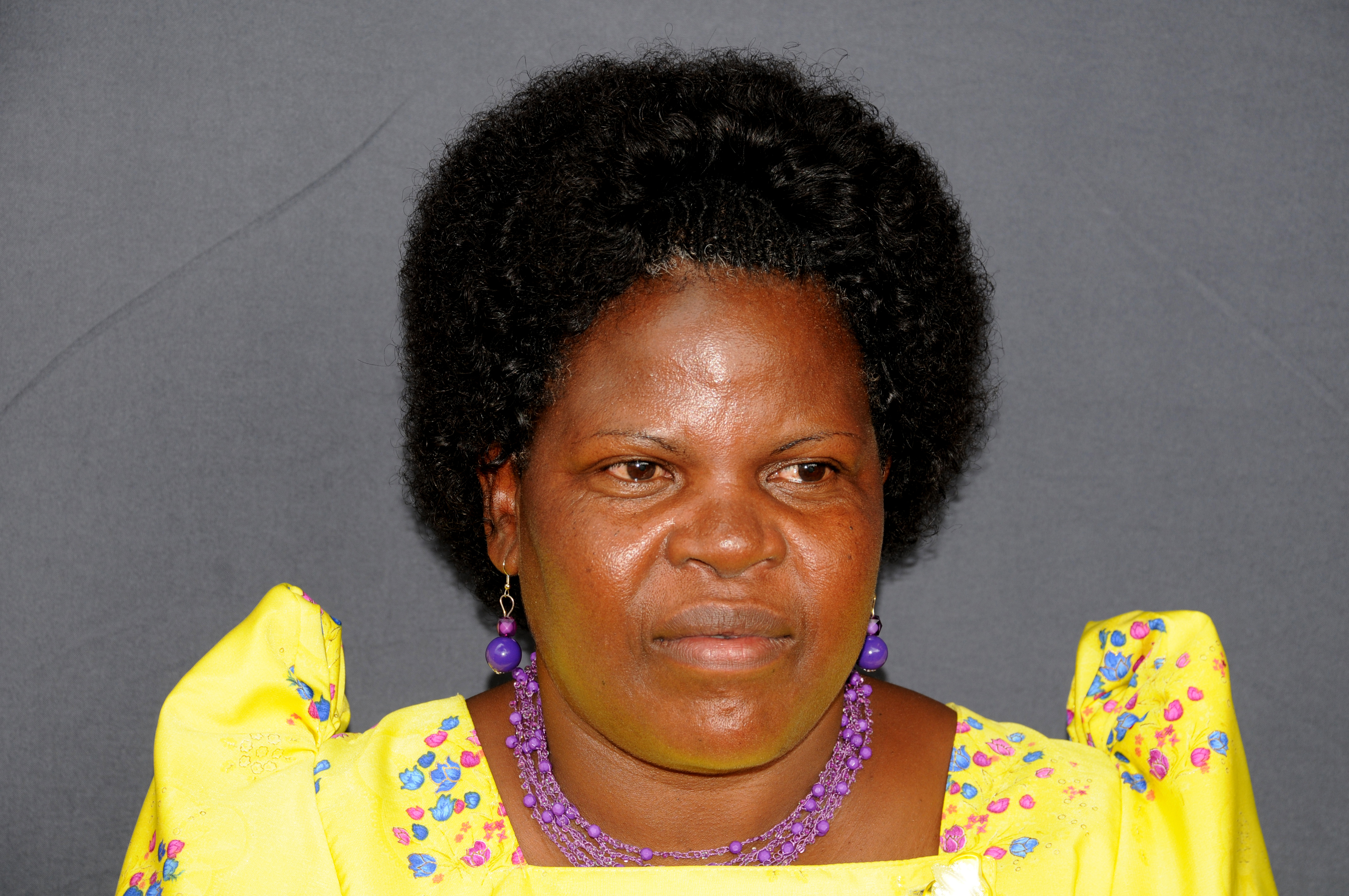
- Born: 22 May 1958 (age 68); Kumi District, Uganda
- Citizenship: Uganda
- Education: St. Aloysius Teachers College (Grade III Teaching Certificate); Kyambogo University (Diploma in Education); Makerere University (Bachelor of Education); Uganda Management Institute (Diploma in Management) (Master of Arts in Human Resources Management)
- Occupations: Teacher and politician
- Years active: 1980–present
- Known for: Politics
- Title: State Minister for Teso

Christine Hellen Amongin Aporu is a Ugandan educator and politician. She served as the State Minister for Teso Affairs in the Office of the Prime Minister in the Cabinet of Uganda. She was appointed to that position on 27 May 2011. She represented Kumi District in Parliament as a women's representative.

== Early life and education ==
Amongin was born in Kumi District on 22 May 1958. She attended Nabuyanga Primary School and Soroti Secondary School. She studied at St. Aloysius Teachers College, in Ngora District, graduating with the Grade III Certificate in Teaching, in 1979. In 1986, she graduated from the Institute of Teacher Education Kyambogo, now part of Kyambogo University, with the Diploma in Education. She holds the degree of Bachelor of Education, obtained from Makerere University in 1996. She also holds a postgraduate Diploma in Management from Uganda Management Institute (UMI), awarded in 2005. Her degree of Masters in Human Resources Management was obtained from UMI in 2009.

== Before politics ==
Amongin Aporu began her career as a primary school teacher in 1980, serving in that capacity until 1984. Following her graduation from ITEK in 1986, she became a tutor at a teacher training college, serving in that capacity until 1996.

== Politics ==
She was first elected to represent Kumi District in 1996. Between 2001 and 2006, she served as a State Minister. She was a member of the Demobilization Resettlement Team of the Amnesty Commission, following the departure of the LRA from Ugandan soil. Following the 2011 national election she was appointed Minister of State for Teso Affairs.

== See also ==
- Cabinet of Uganda
- Parliament of Uganda
