= List of members of the eighth Parliament of Uganda =

This is a list of members elected to the eighth Parliament of Uganda (2006 to 2011) in the 2006 general election. It was preceded by the seventh Parliament and succeeded by the ninth Parliament. The eighth Parliament was the first multi-party Parliament since the fourth Parliament, following the 2005 referendum.

== List of members ==
| Name | Party | Constituency | District |
|---|---|---|---|
| Piro Santos Eruaga | NRM | East Moyo | Adjumani District |
| Eriyo Jessca | FDC | Women's Representative | Adjumani District |
| Ojok Bleo | INDEP | Kioga County | Amolatar District |
| Amali Caroline Okao | INDEP | Women's Representative | Amolatar District |
| Ecweru Musa Francis | FDC | Amuria County | Amuria District |
| Malinga Johnson | | Kapelebyong | Amuria District |
| Acen Rhoda | FDC | Women's Representative | Amuria District |
| Ogwang John | FDC | Kole County | Apac District |
| Anokbonggo Willy Washington | UPC | Kwania County | Apac District |
| Ebong David | NRM | Maruzi County | Apac District |
| Wacha Ben | INDEP | Oyam County North | Apac District |
| Okulo Epak Yefusa | | Oyam County South | Apac District |
| Amongi Betty Ongom | INDEP | Women's Representative | Apac District |
| Akbar Hussein Godi | FDC | Arua Municipality | Arua District |
| Angufiru Margaret | INDEP | Ayivu County | Arua District |
| Arumadri John Drazu | FDC | Madi-Okollo County | Arua District |
| Aadroa Onzima Alex | FDC | Maracha County | Arua District |
| Wadri Kasiano Ezati | FDC | Terego County | Arua District |
| Ejua Simon | FDC | Vurra County | Arua District |
| Bako Christine Abia | NRM | Women's Representative | Arua District |
| Mukisa Fred | NRM | Bukooli Central | Bugiri District |
| Balangira Abdul Nakendo | | Bukooli North | Bugiri District |
| Ochieng Peter Patrick | FDC | Bukooli South | Bugiri District |
| Kasule Justine Lumumba | | Women's Representative | Bugiri District |
| Bartile Johnson Toskin | INDEP | Kongasis County | Bukwo District |
| Tete Chelangati Everline | NRM | Women's Representative | Bukwo District |
| Matte Joseph Sibalinghana Kiregheya | | Bughendera County | Bundibugyo District |
| Kamanda Cos Bataringaya | NRM | Bwamba County | Bundibugyo District |
| Mugarra Kabagambe Francis | | Ntoroko County | Bundibugyo District |
| Alisemera Babiiha Jane | NRM | Women's Representative | Bundibugyo District |
| Bikwasizehi Kihuka Deusdedit | DP | Buhweju County | Bushenyi District |
| Tindamanyire Kabondo Gaudioso | NRM | Bunyaruguru County | Bushenyi District |
| Nduhuura Richard Barugahare | NRM | Igara County East | Bushenyi District |
| Bazana Kabwegyere Tarsis | NRM | Igara County West | Bushenyi District |
| Otafiire Kahinda | NRM | Ruhinda County | Bushenyi District |
| Tumwesigye Elioda | NRM | Sheema County North | Bushenyi District |
| Kamuntu Ephraim | NRM | Sheema County South | Bushenyi District |
| Busigye Mary Karooro Okurut | NRM | Women's Representative | Bushenyi District |
| Opio Gabriel | | Samia Bugwe County South | Busia District |
| Wasike Stephen Mugeni | | Samia Bugwe North | Busia District |
| Munyira Wabwire Rose O | NRM | Women's Representative | Busia District |
| Dombo Emmanuel Lumala | NRM | Bunyole County | Butaleja District |
| Hyuha Samali Dorothy | INDEP | Women's Representative | Butaleja District |
| Okumu Ronald Reagan | NRM | Aswa County | Gulu District |
| Oceng D Alex Penytoo | NRM | Gulu Municipal Council | Gulu District |
| Nyeko Ocula Michael | NRM | Kilak County | Gulu District |
| Oyet Simon | FDC | Nwoya County | Gulu District |
| Toolit Simon Akecha | FDC | Omoro County | Gulu District |
| Aol Betty Ocan | FDC | Women's Representative | Gulu District |
| Kiiza Rwebembera James | DP | Bugahya County | Hoima District |
| Kyahurwenda Abwooli K Tom | NRM | Buhaguzi County | Hoima District |
| Byenkya Beatrice Nyakaisiki | NRM | Women's Representative | Hoima District |
| Guma Gumisiriza David | NRM | Ibanda County North | Ibanda District |
| Byabagambi John | NRM | Ibanda County South | Ibanda District |
| Kiboijana Margaret N | FDC | Women's Representative | Ibanda District |
| Kirunda Kivejinja Ali Muwabe | | Bugweri County | Iganga District |
| Musoke Moses Mutabali | NRM | Busiki County | Iganga District |
| Baliddawa Edward Kafufu | DP | Kigulu County North | Iganga District |
| Muwuma Milton Kalulu | NRM | Kigulu County South | Iganga District |
| Mulumba Meddie B | NRM | Luuka County | Iganga District |
| Magoola Beatrice Zirabamuzaale | | Women's Representative | Iganga District |
| Byanyima Nathan | | Bukanga County | Isingiro District |
| Rwamirama Kanyontore Bright | NRM | Isingiro County North | Isingiro District |
| Byangaba Alex Bakunda | NRM | Isingiro County South | Isingiro District |
| Kyokuhairwa Kyaka Viccy | | Women's Representative | Isingiro District |
| Daudi Migereko | NRM | Butembe County | Jinja District |
| Nathan Nabeta Igeme | NRM | Jinja Municipality East | Jinja District |
| Kasigwa Harry | NRM | Jinja Municipality West | Jinja District |
| Mbagadhi Frederick Nkayi | NRM | Kagoma County | Jinja District |
| Ruth Tuma | NRM | Women's Representative | Jinja District |
| Ael Ark Lodou | | Dodoth County | Kaabong District |
| Christine Nakwang Tubo | INDEP | Women's Representative | Kaabong District |
| Rukundo Serapio | NRM | Kabale Municipality | Kabale District |
| Niwagaba Wilfred | FDC | Ndorwa County East | Kabale District |
| Bahati David | NRM | Ndorwa County West | Kabale District |
| Ahabwe Pereza Godfrey | NRM | Rubanda County East | Kabale District |
| Banyenzaki Henry | FDC | Rubanda County West | Kabale District |
| Byanagwa Samuel Rwamafa | NRM | Rukiga County | Kabale District |
| Mwesigye Ruhindi Hope | NRM | Women's Representative | Kabale District |
| Mwesige Adolf | NRM | Bunyangabu County | Kabarole District |
| Kasaija Stephen Kagwera | NRM | Burahya County | Kabarole District |
| Kaliba Steven | NRM | Fort Portal Municipality | Kabarole District |
| Mugisa Muhanga Margaret | NRM | Women's Representative | Kabarole District |
| Emigu Julius Peter | NRM | Kaberamaido County | Kaberamaido District |
| Euku Simon Ross | NRM | Kalaki County | Kaberamaido District |
| Akwau Ibi Florence | FDC | Women's Representative | Kaberamaido District |
| Badda Fred | | Bujumba County | Kalangala District |
| Kabuusu Moses Wagaba | NRM | Kyamuswa | Kalangala District |
| Nvumetta Ruth Kavuma | NRM | Women's Representative | Kalangala District |
| Wambuzi Nelson Gagawala | NRM | Bulamogi | Kaliro District |
| Kisira Margaret | NRM | Women's Representative | Kaliro District |
| Lukwago Erias | DP | Kampala Central | Kampala District |
| Ssebaggala Abdlatif Ssengendo | NRM | Kawempe Division North | Kampala District |
| Sebuliba Mutumba Richard | DP | Kawempe Division South | Kampala District |
| Mabikke Micheal | DP | Makindye Division East | Kampala District |
| Kyanjo Hussein | JEEMA | Makindye Division West | Kampala District |
| Ruhindi Freddie | NRM | Nakawa Division | Kampala District |
| Kamya Beti Olive Namisango | NRM | Rubaga Division North | Kampala District |
| Nampijja Lukyamuzi Susan | NRM | Rubaga Division South | Kampala District |
| Sempala Naggayi Nabilah | NRM | Women's Representative | Kampala District |
| Balikowa Henry | NRM | Budiope County | Kamuli District |
| Menhya Gerald Simon | NRM | Bugabula County North | Kamuli District |
| Kiyingi Asuman | NRM | Bugabula South | Kamuli District |
| Musumba Isaac Isanga | NRM | Buzaaya | Kamuli District |
| Alitwala Rebecca Kadaga | NRM | Women's Representative | Kamuli District |
| Tumwebaze K Frank | NRM | Kibale County | Kamwenge District |
| Byamukama Nulu | NRM | Kitagwenda County | Kamwenge District |
| Hashaka Kabahweza Florence | NRM | Women's Representative | Kamwenge District |
| Baryomunsi Chris | NRM | Kinkizi County East | Kanungu District |
| Amama Mbabazi | NRM | Kinkizi County West | Kanungu District |
| Kyatuheire Jacqueline | NRM | Women's Representative | Kanungu District |
| Arapkissa Yekko John | INDEP | Kween County | Kapchorwa District |
| Sabila Herbert Kaale | NRM | Tingey County | Kapchorwa District |
| Chekamondo Ruykiya Kulany | NRM | Women's Representative | Kapchorwa District |
| Kithende Kalibogha Apporinali | | Bukonzo County East | Kasese District |
| Kiyonga Chrispus | | Bukonzo County West | Kasese District |
| Kyetunda Elijah | NRM | Busongora County North | Kasese District |
| Kibanzanga Christopher Mbalibulaa | NRM | Busongora County South | Kasese District |
| Winnie Kiiza | NRM | Women's Representative | Kasese District |
| Oleny Charles Ojok | NRM | Usuk County | Katakwi District |
| Alupo Jessica RR Epel | NRM | Women's Representative | Katakwi District |
| Madaada Kyebakoze Suleiman | INDEP | Bbale County | Kayunga District |
| Nyombi Nansubuga Sarah | FDC | Ntenjeru County North | Kayunga District |
| Kazibwe Musisi Tom | FDC | Ntenjeru County South | Kayunga District |
| Nayiga Florence Ssekabira | NRM | Women's Representative | Kayunga District |
| Bakeine Mabel Lilian Komugisha | NRM | Bugangaizi County | Kibaale District |
| Tinkasiimire Barnabas | NRM | Buyaga County | Kibaale District |
| Kasaija Matia | NRM | Buyanja County | Kibaale District |
| Sekitoleko Kabonesa Juliet Kibirige Abwoli | INDEP | Women's Representative | Kibaale District |
| Serunjogi Lastus Katende | NRM | Kiboga County East | Kiboga District |
| Ndawula Edward Mike Kaweesi | NRM | Kiboga County West | Kiboga District |
| Nankabirwa Ruth Ssentamu | NRM | Women's Representative | Kiboga District |
| Nasasira John Mwoono | NRM | Kazo County | Kiruhura District |
| Mugyenyi Rutamwebwa Mary | NRM | Nyabushozi County | Kiruhura District |
| Barumba Beatrice Rusaniya | NRM | Women's Representative | Kiruhura District |
| Buturo Nsaba | NRM | Bufumbira County East | Kisoro District |
| Bahane Niyibizi Silver | NRM | Bufumbira County North | Kisoro District |
| Bucyanayandi Tress | NRM | Bufumbira County South | Kisoro District |
| Kwizera Eudia | JEEMA | Women's Representative | Kisoro District |
| Okello Okello John Livingstone | | Chua County | Kitgum District |
| Oryem Henry Okello | | Chua County | Kitgum District |
| Anywar Atim O Beatrice | FDC | Women's Representative | Kitgum District |
| Baba James Boliba | NRM | Koboko County | Koboko District |
| Baba Diri Margaret | NRM | Women's Representative | Koboko District |
| Lokii Peter Abrahams | NRM | Jie County | Kotido District |
| Ojwok Omwony | | Labwor County | Kotido District |
| Okorimoe Janet Grace Akech | | Women's Representative | Kotido District |
| Oduman Albert Charles Okello | FDC | Bukedea County | Kumi District |
| Amuriat Oboi Patrick | FDC | Kumi County | Kumi District |
| Epetait Francis | FDC | Ngora County | Kumi District |
| Akiror Agnes | FDC | Women's Representative | Kumi District |
| Katongole Badhul | NRM | Kyaka County | Kyenjojo District |
| Butime Tom R | FDC | Mwenge County North | Kyenjojo District |
| Kajara Aston Peterson | FDC | Mwenge County South | Kyenjojo District |
| Kwebiha Joyce | | Women's Representative | Kyenjojo District |
| Okot Ogong Felix | NRM | Dokolo County | Lira District |
| Angiro Gutmoi Charles | INDEP | Erute County North | Lira District |
| Odit John | NRM | Erute County South | Lira District |
| Akena James Micheal Jimmy | UPC | Lira Municipality | Lira District |
| Obua-Ogwal Benson | UPC | Moroto County | Lira District |
| Atubo Omara Daniel | INDEP | Otuke County | Lira District |
| Amuge Rebecca Otengo | INDEP | Women's Representative | Lira District |
| Sekyanzi Ndawula Ali | NRM | Bamunanika County | Luweero District |
| Byandala Abraham James | NRM | Katikamu County North | Luweero District |
| Khiddu Makubuya Edward | NRM | Katikamu County South | Luweero District |
| Lukwago Rebecca Nalwanga | NRM | Women's Representative | Luweero District |
| Wopuwa George William | NRM | Bubulo County East | Manafwa District |
| Bukeni Gyabi Fred | NRM | Bubulo County West | Manafwa District |
| Wakikona Wandendeya David | NRM | Manjiya County | Manafwa District |
| Kayagi Sarah Netalisire | NRM | Women's Representative | Manafwa District |
| Lubyayi Iddi Kisiki | INDEP | Bukomansimbi County | Masaka District |
| Ssekandi Edward Kiwanuka | NRM | Bukoto Central | Masaka District |
| Alintuma John Nsambu C | NRM | Bukoto East | Masaka District |
| Sejjoba Isaac | | Bukoto Mid-West | Masaka District |
| Birekeraawo Nsubuga Mathius | INDEP | Bukoto South | Masaka District |
| Kitatta Aboud | NRM | Bukoto West | Masaka District |
| Sserunjogi James Mukiibi | NRM | Kalungu East | Masaka District |
| Yiga Anothony | NRM | Kalungu West | Masaka District |
| Kawanga John Baptist | NRM | Masaka Municipality | Masaka District |
| Mugerwa Sauda | | Women's Representative | Masaka District |
| Kabakumba Labwooni Masiko | INDEP | Bujenje County | Masindi District |
| Mukitale Biraahwa Stephen Adyeri | NRM | Buliisa County | Masindi District |
| Kaahwa Erisa Amooti | NRM | Buruli County | Masindi District |
| Owor Amooti Otada | UPC | Kibanda County | Masindi District |
| Bintu Jalia Lukumu | NRM | Women's Representative | Masindi District |
| Kubeketerya James | NRM | Bunya County East | Mayuge District |
| Kyeyago Jowali Kagwa | NRM | Bunya County South | Mayuge District |
| Bagiire Aggrey Henry | NRM | Bunya County West | Mayuge District |
| Nakadama Lukia Isanga | FDC | Women's Representative | Mayuge District |
| Gudoi Yahaya | NRM | Bungokho County North | Mbale District |
| Kafabusa Micheal Werikhe | NRM | Bungokho County South | Mbale District |
| Kajeke Wilfred | FDC | Mbale Municipality | Mbale District |
| Wangwa Rutagye Nagudi Erinah | NRM | Women's Representative | Mbale District |
| Tibamanya Urban PK | NRM | Kashari County | Mbarara District |
| Arimpa Kigyagi John | NRM | Mbarara Municipality | Mbarara District |
| Ngabirano Charles | NRM | Rwampara | Mbarara District |
| Boona Emma | NRM | Women's Representative | Mbarara District |
| Nyanzi Vicent | NRM | Busujju County | Mityana District |
| Katende Gordon Sematiko | FDC | Mityana County North | Mityana District |
| Kaddumukasa Ssozi Jerome | NRM | Mityana County South | Mityana District |
| Ssinabulya Sylvia Namabidde | NRM | Women's Representative | Mityana District |
| Achia Terence Naco | NRM | Bokora County | Moroto District |
| Abura Samuel Pirir | NRM | Matheniko County | Moroto District |
| Ogwel Loote Sammy | UPC | Moroto Municipality | Moroto District |
| Namoe Stella Nyomera | CP | Women's Representative | Moroto District |
| Fungaroo Kaps Hassan | NRM | Obongi County | Moyo District |
| Apiliga Moses Jako | UPC | West Moyo County | Moyo District |
| Auru Anne | INDEP | Women's Representative | Moyo District |
| Kadunabbi Ibrahim Lubega Iga | NRM | Butambala County | Mpigi District |
| Najjemba Rosemary Muyinda | NRM | Gomba County | Mpigi District |
| Mutuluuza Peter Claveri B | INDEP | Mawokota County North | Mpigi District |
| Lubyayi Johnbosco Sseguya | NRM | Mawokota County South | Mpigi District |
| Namirembe Geraldine Bitamazire | NRM | Women's Representative | Mpigi District |
| Bwerere Kasole L Edward | NRM | Buwekula County | Mubende District |
| Ssalabaya Haruuna | NRM | Kassanda County North | Mubende District |
| Nyombi Thembo GW | INDEP | Kassanda County South | Mubende District |
| Najjuma Faridah Kasasa | NRM | Women's Representative | Mubende District |
| Kakoba Onyango | NRM | Buikwe County North | Mukono District |
| Mukasa Anthony Harris | | Buikwe County South | Mukono District |
| Muwulize Norman Ibrahim | NRM | Buikwe County West | Mukono District |
| Nsubuga William | | Buvuma County (Islands) | Mukono District |
| Bakaluba Mukasa Peter | NRM | Mukono County North | Mukono District |
| Mukwaya Balunzi Janat | NRM | Mukono County South | Mukono District |
| Mugambe Joseph Kifomusana | NRM | Nakifuma County | Mukono District |
| Nalugo Sekiziyivu Mary Margaret | NRM | Women's Representative | Mukono District |
| Lokeris Peter T Aimat | INDEP | Chekwii County (Kadam) | Nakapiripirit District |
| Achia Remigio | NRM | Pian County | Nakapiripirit District |
| Kiyonga Francis Adamson | NRM | Upe County | Nakapiripirit District |
| Iriama Rose | NRM | Women's Representative | Nakapiripirit District |
| Bbumba Namirembe Syda | NRM | Nakaseke County | Nakaseke District |
| Namayanja Rose Nsereko | NRM | Women's Representative | Nakaseke District |
| Nyombi Peter | NRM | Nakasongola County | Nakasongola District |
| Tubwita Grace Bagaya Bukenya | NRM | Women's Representative | Nakasongola District |
| Jachan Fred Omach Mandir | NRM | Jonam County | Nebbi District |
| Dujanga Simon Giw | INDEP | Okoro County | Nebbi District |
| Ringe Chan David | INDEP | Padyere County | Nebbi District |
| Akumu Catherine Mavenjina | NRM | Women's Representative | Nebbi District |
| Tashobya N Stephen | NRM | Kajara County | Ntungamo District |
| Museveni Janet Kataha | NRM | Ruhaama County | Ntungamo District |
| Rukutana Mwesigwa | NRM | Rushenyi County | Ntungamo District |
| Rwakimari Beatrice | NRM | Women's Representative | Ntungamo District |
| Ogenga Latigo Morris W | FDC | Agago County | Pader District |
| Odonga Samuel Otto | FDC | Aruu County | Pader District |
| Akello Judith Franca | FDC | Women's Representative | Pader District |
| Kiryapawo Loi Kageni | NRM | Budaka County | Pallisa District |
| Mallinga Stephen Oscar | NRM | Butebo County | Pallisa District |
| Kamba Saleh MW | FDC | Kibuku County | Pallisa District |
| Opange Louis | NRM | Pallisa County | Pallisa District |
| Namuyangu Kacha Jennipher | NRM | Women's Representative | Pallisa District |
| Kakooza James | | Kabula County | Rakai District |
| Kasamba Mathais | FDC | Kakuuto County | Rakai District |
| Magulumaali Mugumya Erasmus | INDEP | Kooki County | Rakai District |
| Mujuzi Pius | NRM | Kyotera County | Rakai District |
| Mutagamba Maria Lubega Emily | NRM | Women's Representative | Rakai District |
| Turyahikayo Kebirungi Mary Paula | NRM | Rubabo County | Rukungiri District |
| Muhwezi Jim Katugugu | NRM | Rujumbura County | Rukungiri District |
| Masiko Winifred Komuhangi | NRM | Women's Representative | Rukungiri District |
| Ssekikubo Theodore | NRM | Lwemiyaga County | Sembabule District |
| Kutesa Sam Kahamba | NRM | Mawogola County | Sembabule District |
| Bangirana Anifa Kawooya | NRM | Women's Representative | Sembabule District |
| Busima Cosmas Mafabi W | NRM | Budadiri County East | Sironko District |
| Nandala Mafabi Nathan | NRM | Budadiri County West | Sironko District |
| Wamakuyu Mudimi | NRM | Bulambuli County | Sironko District |
| Mukaye Wabudeya Beatrice | NRM | Women's Representative | Sironko District |
| Okupa Elijah | FDC | Kasilo County | Soroti District |
| Otekat John Emilly | NRM | Serere County | Soroti District |
| Omolo Peter | INDEP | Soroti County | Soroti District |
| Ekemu Charles Willy | FDC | Soroti Municipality | Soroti District |
| Alaso Alice Asianut | FDC | Women's Representative | Soroti District |
| Ekanya Geofrey | FDC | Tororo County | Tororo District |
| Tanna Sanjay | INDEP | Tororo Municipality | Tororo District |
| Okecho William | INDEP | West Budama County North | Tororo District |
| Otiam Otaala Emmanuel | INDEP | West Budama County South | Tororo District |
| Oburu Grace | UPC | Women's Representative | Tororo District |
| Susan Nakawuki | NRM | Busiro County East | Wakiso District |
| Balikuddembe Joseph Mutebi | NRM | Busiro County South | Wakiso District |
| Bukenya Gilbert Baliseka | | Busiro North | Wakiso District |
| Kawuma Mohamed | NRM | Entebbe Municipality | Wakiso District |
| Njuba Samuel Kalega | NRM | Kyadondo County East | Wakiso District |
| Kibirige Sebunya Israel | | Kyadondo County North | Wakiso District |
| Kikuungwe Issa | NRM | Kyadondo County South | Wakiso District |
| Rosemary Sseninde | FDC | Women's Representative | Wakiso District |
| Olega Ashraf Noah | FDC | Aringa County | Yumbe District |
| Oleru Huda | INDEP | Women's Representative | Yumbe District |
| Ndeezi Alex | | Representative of People with Disabilities (Central Region) | |
| Balyejjusa Julius | | Representative of People with Disabilities (Eastern Region) | |
| Nalule Safia | | Representative of People with Disabilities (Female) | |
| Nokrach Wilson William | | Representative of People with Disabilities (Northern Region) | |
| Katuramu Hood Kiribedda | | Representative of People with Disabilities (Western Region) | |
| Muyomba Joseph Kaso | | Representative of the Youth (Central Region) | |
| Kibedi Zaake Wanume | | Representative of the Youth (Eastern Region) | |
| Mulalu Daniel | | Representative of the Youth (Eastern Region) | |
| Obua Denis Hamson | | Representative of the Youth (Northern Region) | |
| Kashaija Robert | | Representative of the Youth (Western Region) | |
| Aronda Nyakairima | Representative of the Uganda People's Defence Forces | | |
| Kyamulesire Ramadhan | Representative of the Uganda People's Defence Forces | | |
| Kyomugisha Grace | Representative of the Uganda People's Defence Forces | | |
| Makumbi James | Representative of the Uganda People's Defence Forces | | |
| Manoni Phinehas Katirima | Representative of the Uganda People's Defence Forces | | |
| Mpabwa Sarah | Representative of the Uganda People's Defence Forces | | |
| Okello Francis | Representative of the Uganda People's Defence Forces | | |
| Oketcho Julius Facki | Representative of the Uganda People's Defence Forces | | |
| Tinyefuza David | Representative of the Uganda People's Defence Forces | | |
| Tumwine Elly T | Representative of the Uganda People's Defence Forces | | |
| Bakkabulindi Charles | | Workers' Representative | |
| Lyomoki Sam | | Workers' Representative | |
| Pajobo Joram Bruno | | Workers' Representative | |
| Ssentongo Nabulya Theopista | | Workers' Representative | |
| Tuunde Mary Marion Nulubega | | Workers' Representative | |
