= Theopista =

Theopista is a feminine given name. Notable people with the name include:

- Theopista (died 118), Christian saint
- Theopista Sekitto Ntale (born 1970), Ugandan banker, social entrepreneur and philanthropist
- Nabulya Theopista Ssentongo (born 1951), Ugandan politician
