= Angufiru Margaret =

Ugandan Politician

Member of Parliament for Ayivu County, Arua District
- Preceded by: Betty Akech

Personal details
- Born: Uganda
- Party: Independent (later expressed intention to join National Resistance Movement)
- Occupation: Politician, Nurse, Community worker
- Known for: Member of Parliament for Ayivu County

Angufiru Margaret is a Ugandan politician, trained nurse and community worker who served in the Eighth Parliament of Uganda as a member of Parliament for Ayivu County, Arua district as an Independent Candidate.

== Political background ==
While serving as a member of Parliament for Ayivu County, she constructed a health centre worth 300 Uganda million shillings in Oluko sub-county aimed at improving the health condition of the people in the constituency. Margaret succeeded the former State Minister for Security, Betty Akech and promised to extend education to the people of Ayivu County. She was alleged to have an interest in contesting the Women Member of Parliament sit. After winning as an independent candidate, Margaret mentioned that she would join the National Resistance Movement political party.She was accused for mismanaging the relief food distribution exercise together with Simon Ejua the state minister for Transport.

== See also ==
- List of members of the Eighth Parliament of Uganda
- Jacob Oulanyah
