= Florence Nkurukenda =

Ugandan educator, former Minister and Member of Parliament (born 1941)

Florence Nkurukenda Honourable

Deputy Chairperson, Electoral Commission, Uganda 1996 - 2002
- Succeeded by: Sr.Margaret Magoba

Women Representative, Masindi District 1989 - 1996
- Succeeded by: Monica Kiraahwa

Deputy Minister, Local Government 1989 - 1991

Deputy Minister of Labour 1988

Personal details
- Born: Florence K. Nkurukenda; 1941 (age 84–85) Kabale

Florence Nkurukenda (born 1941) is a Ugandan educator and former Member of Parliament. She served as the Woman Representative for the Masindi District on the National Resistance Committee (1989 - 1996) during which time she was appointed Deputy Minister of Labour (1988) and Local Government (1989 - 1991). She was also the Deputy Chairperson of Uganda's Interim Electoral Commission (1996) and occupied the same position when the Commission was made permanent in 1997.

== Background and education ==
Nkurukenda was born in Kabale, Uganda. She has a Bachelor of Arts degree in Fine Art, in addition to a diploma in Education.

== Career ==
=== Politics ===
Nkurukenda contested in the 1989 Ugandan general elections to become Woman Representative for Masindi District in the then National Resistance Council. Between 1989 and 1991, she would serve as the Deputy Minister for Local Government alongside Stephen Chebrot. Prior to that she had worked as the Deputy Minister of Labour (1988).

=== Post-politics ===
Alongside Syda Bbumba and Florence Ssekagya, Nkurukenda was one of the three women on Uganda's interim Electoral Commission that organised the 1996 Ugandan Presidential and Parliamentary Elections. In October 1996 when the Electoral Commission was made permanent, she was appointed to serve as the Deputy Chairperson on Uganda's Electoral Commission. She deputised Aziz Kasujja but along with 5 other commissioners retired on 31 July 2002 "in public interest".

She was later recruited to train Nigerian Electoral officials under the International Foundation for Electoral Systems.

== See also ==
- Masindi District
- Electoral Commission Uganda
