= Lukwago =

Lukwago is both a given name and a surname. Notable people with the name include:

- Lukwago Rebecca Nalwanga, Ugandan politician
- Charles Lukwago (born 1992), Ugandan footballer
- Erias Lukwago (born 1970), Ugandan lawyer and politician
