= Ruth Tuma =

Ugandan politician and educator

Tuma Ruth
- Died: July 2016; Kampala International Hospital
- Resting place: Namutumba district
- Education: Uganda Christian University
- Occupations: Politician and educator/teacher
- Years active: 2001-2016
- Known for: Politics
- Term: 11 years
- Successor: Agnes Nabirye
- Political party: National Resistance Movement (NRM)
- Spouse: Rev Canon Dr Tom Tuma

Ruth Tuma (died 2016) was a Ugandan politician and educator who served in the seventh (2001 - 2006) and eighth (2006 - 2011) Parliament of Uganda representing Jinja District.

== Biography ==
Tuna obtained her Bachelors of Arts in Education and a Masters' Degree of Education in Planning and Administration from Ugandan Christian University, Mukono. She also studied at Kyambogo National and Bishop Willis Teacher's Colleges.

Tuna was known for advocating for education for girls in Busoga. She also assisted rural women by providing coffee seedlings and banana suckers to them.

Tuma served as the Member of Parliament of Jinja District from 2001 to 2006. During Tuma's time in parliament, she was the chairperson of the Uganda Parliamentary Forum for Children and a member of the finance and budget committees for the Uganda Parliament Parliamentarians for Global Action. She served in other capacities that included being a member of the board of directors, deputy convener for peace and democracy and president of the Federation of University Women of Africa. In 2007, she appealed for the protection of children from sexual offenders and demanded that parliament should play a more active role in protecting human rights and fighting poverty.

In 2016, Tuma was defeated by Agnes Nabirye in the National Resistance Movement primaries.

In 2016, she died of cancer on the 13th of July at Kampala International Hospital following several months illness with cancer. Before her death, she was flown to South Africa for medical attention. Tuma was buried at her ancestral home in Namutumba district.

== Personal life ==
Tuma was married to Rev. Canon Dr. Tom Tuma. The couple had four children.

== See also ==
- List of members of the eighth Parliament of Uganda
