= Nokrach William Wilson =

Nokrach William Wilson (born on 30 September 1952 ) is an Ugandan politician and disability rights advocate who served as the Member of Parliament representing Persons with Disabilities for Northern Uganda in the Parliament of Uganda.

== Early life and education ==
Nokrach attended teacher training and obtained Grade III Teachers Certificate. He later pursued higher education at Uganda Christian University, where he earned a bachelor's degree in Social Work and Social Administration.

== Political career ==
Nokrach served as the representative for Persons with Disabilities (PWDs) for Northern Uganda in the eighth and ninth Parliaments of Uganda.

During this tenure in Parliament, he participated in discussions and advocacy related to disability rights, education access for children with disabilities and political representation for persons with disabilities in Uganda.

In 2014, the Central Executive Committee of the National Resistance Movement appointed him as a Parliamentary Commissioner.

== Election petition and by-election ==
In 2017, the Court of Appeal of Uganda nullified Nokrach's election following a petition that challenged the electoral process and academic qualifications presented during the election.

Later the same year, he regained the parliamentary seat after winning a by-election for Northern Uganda PWD representative position conducted by the Electoral Commission of Uganda.

== Public engagements ==
Nokrach has been associated with community mobilization and disability advocacy activities in Northern Uganda. He has also participated in public event related to development initiatives and social welfare programs in the region.

== See also ==
- Parliament of Uganda
- List of Members of the Eighth Parliament of Uganda
