= Josephine Kasya =

Ugandan politician

Josephine Kasya is a Ugandan politician, who was the first woman to be elected as a local government chairperson in Uganda. She was elected as the LC5 chairperson in Kanungu District following the introduction of village councils in the country.

== Education and career background ==
Josephine holds a certificate in Grade 3 Education.

In 1992, Josephine served as a women's council leader in the district system. In 1994, she tried to secure a seat in the Rukungiri District Executive Council, contesting against opposition Winnie Mastsiko, but failed to win the election. In 1998, she also served as a deputy chairperson of the Rukungiri district council after making Kanungu a district on its own in 2001 where she was appointed chairperson for a non-permanent six-month term. She decided to run for the seat in the election and won, ending her political leadership. In 2006 she ran for the seat again and won. Josephine was re-elected in which she won with 30,400 votes, equivalent to 51% of the total vote. In 2006, she won again and her work focused on increasing the quality in child care and feeding.

In August 2020, Josephine publicly decided to step down from politics feeling that she had done enough to develop Kanungu and it was time for others to build on the foundations she had laid.

Apart from politics, Josephine has been on the board of the National Water and Sewerage Corporation (NWSC). In this capacity, she has participated in the strategic development and execution of the composition, drawing on her extensive experience in the public sector.
