= Barumba Beatrice Rusaniya =

Ugandan politician

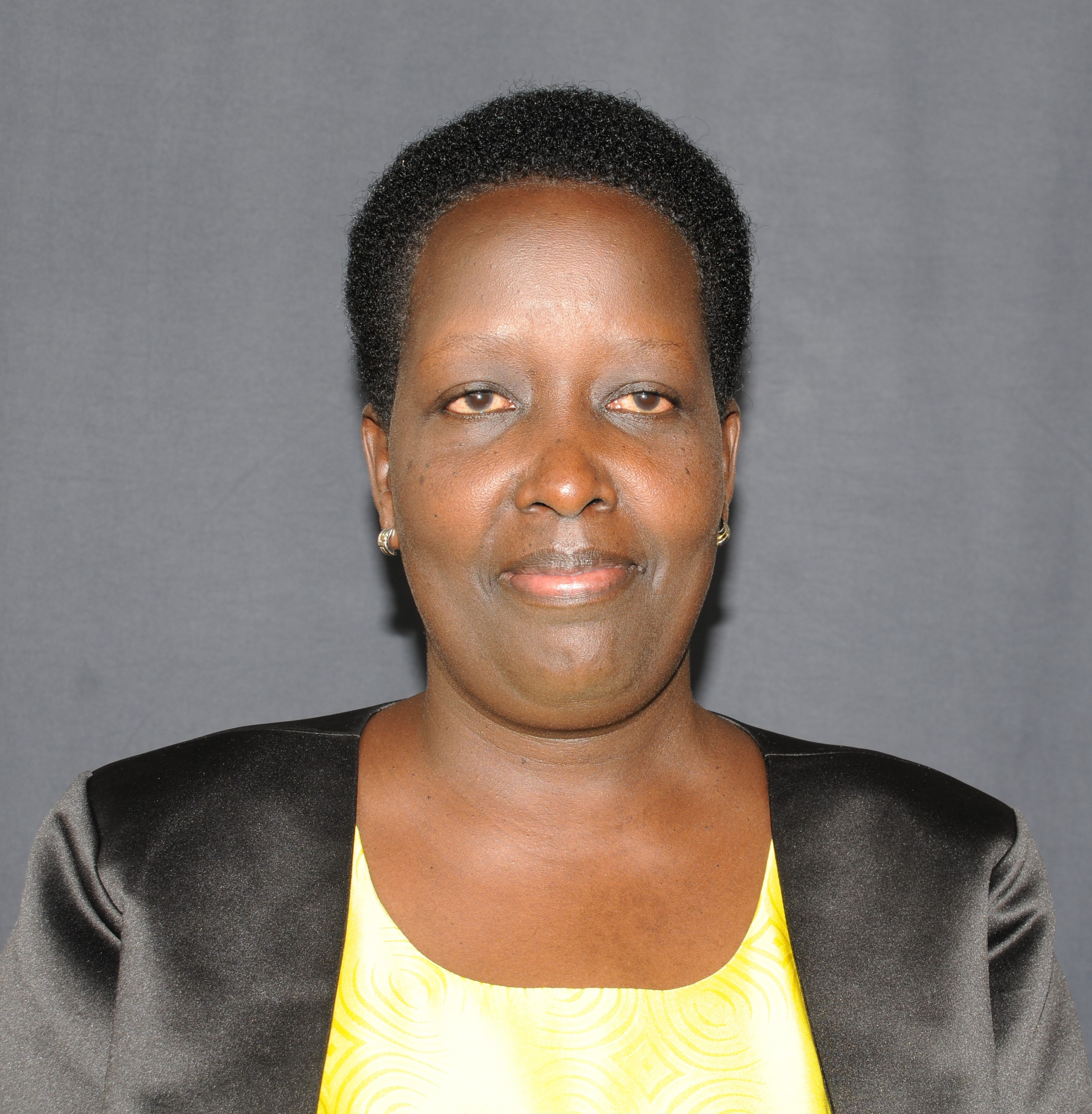
- Born: 2 December 1964 (age 61)
- Citizenship: Ugandan
- Occupation: Politician
- Years active: 2006-2016
- Employer: Parliament of Uganda
- Known for: Politics
- Successor: Sheila Mwine Kabaije
- Political party: National Resistance Movement

Barumba Beatrice Rusaniya (born 2 December 1964) is a female Ugandan politician. She was the National Resistance Movement politician and the Member of Parliament for Kiruhura District in the eighth and ninth Parliament of Uganda. In 2005, when Kiruhura district was created out of Mbarara District, Beatrice became its pioneer Woman Member of Parliament in 2006 and served until 2016.

== Political life ==
In the 2016 to 2021 elections, she lost the elections. She withdrew the election petition she filed challenging the election of her successor, Sheila Mwine Kabaije with allegation that the election exercise was marred with a lot of rigging among other irregularities. Rusaniya was one of the Uganda’s representatives in the Pan African Parliament. However, she was sick during the delegation.

== See also ==
- List of members of the ninth Parliament of Uganda
- List of members of the eighth Parliament of Uganda
- Sheila Mwine Kabaije
- Kiruhura District
- National Resistance Movement
- Parliament of Uganda
- Member of Parliament
