= Acen Rhoda =

Ugandan politician

Member of Parliament (Amuria District)
- In office 2006–2011

Personal details
- Born: Uganda
- Party: Forum for Democratic Change
- Occupation: Politician
- Known for: Representation of Amuria District in the eighth Parliament of Uganda

Acen Rhoda is a Ugandan politician. She was the Forum for Democratic Change representative in the eighth Parliament of Uganda under Amuria District. Rhoda was named after a primary school located in Amusus, Kuju, County, Amuria District called Rhoda Acen Primary School.

== Political career ==
During her political office, Acen said that women in Katakwi in the Eastern Uganda have been selling their children each at 3,000 Uganda Shillings to fend for their families after their husbands fled ahead of the disarmament exercise in the region. This was mentioned by Rhoda while addressing the women Member of Parliament during a workshop organised by the Uganda Women's Network and funded by the Westminster Foundation for Democracy. The workshop was on women's rights under multiparty democracy held at Entebbe Imperial Resort Beach Hotel. In 2020, Rhoda bounced back after beating Susan Amero, the incumbent Member of Parliament. In 2007, she was among the Teso Parliamentary Group who addressed a press conference at Parliament where they displayed some of the rotten samples of the beans supplied by the Government as relief to their people.

== See also ==
- List of members of the eighth Parliament of Uganda
