= Nalwanga =

Nalwanga is a surname. Notable people with the surname include:

- Agnes Nalwanga, Ugandan businesswoman
- Juliet Sekabunga Nalwanga, Ugandan physician
- Lukwago Rebecca Nalwanga, Ugandan politician
- Madina Nalwanga (born 2002), Ugandan actress
