= Ntale =

Ntale is a Ugandan surname. Notable people with the surname include:

- Irene Ntale (born 1988), Ugandan singer, songwriter and guitarist
- Theopista Sekitto Ntale (born 1970), Ugandan banker, social entrepreneur and philanthropist
