= Auru Anne =

Ugandan politician

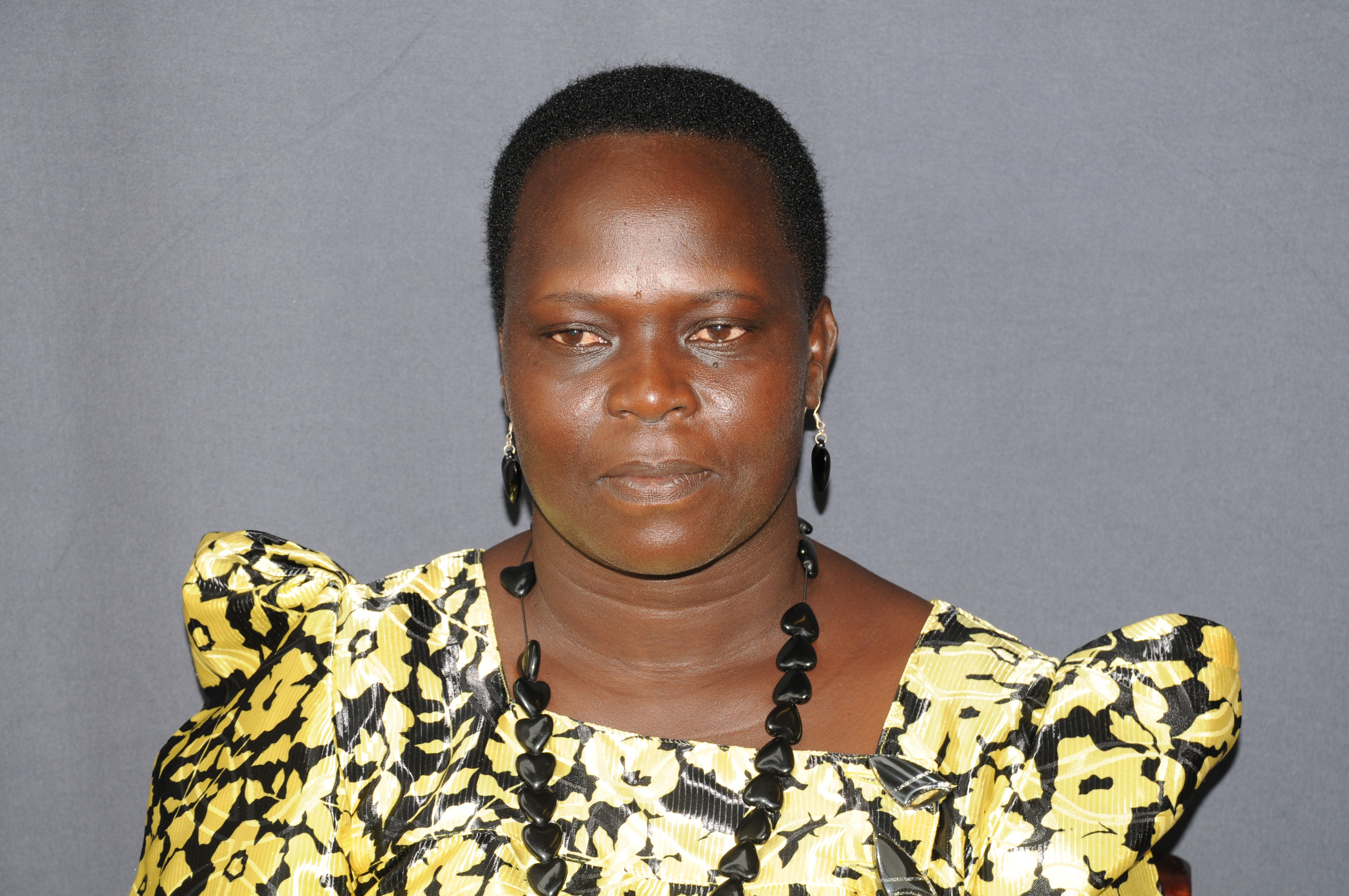

Woman Member of Parliament for Moyo District
- In office 2006–2016

Personal details
- Born: August 25, 1960 (age 65) Uganda
- Party: Independent (8th Parliament); National Resistance Movement (NRM) (9th Parliament)
- Occupation: Politician
- Known for: Woman MP for Moyo District (8th & 9th Parliament); Winning as an Independent in 2011; Winning on the NRM ticket in 2016; Losing seat to Moriku Joyce Kaducu

Auru Anne (born on 25 August 1960) is a Ugandan politician. She was the Member of Parliament in the eighth and ninth Parliament of Uganda representing Moyo District as an Independent Candidate and National Resistance Movement (NRM) political party ticket respectively.

== Political career ==
She has served in two parliament terms: the eighth and ninth parliament of Uganda. In 2011, Auru Anne contested as the Moyo District Woman Representative on an Independent ticket and she won. In 2016, Auru Anne contested as the Moyo District Woman Representative on the ruling National Resistance Movement (NRM) political party ticket, and again she won.

She lost her seat to Hon. Moriku Joyce Kaducu.

== Personal life ==
Auru Anne was summoned by the Uganda National Police over allegation in September 2014, clashes between the Madi community in Moyo and Kuku community of Kajo-Keji County in South Sudan that resulted in loss of lives of about 17 people, cattle raiding, burning houses and robbery.

== See also ==
- Parliament of Uganda
- List of members of the eighth Parliament of Uganda
- List of members of the ninth Parliament of Uganda
- Politics of Uganda
