= Jalia Bintu =

Ugandan politician

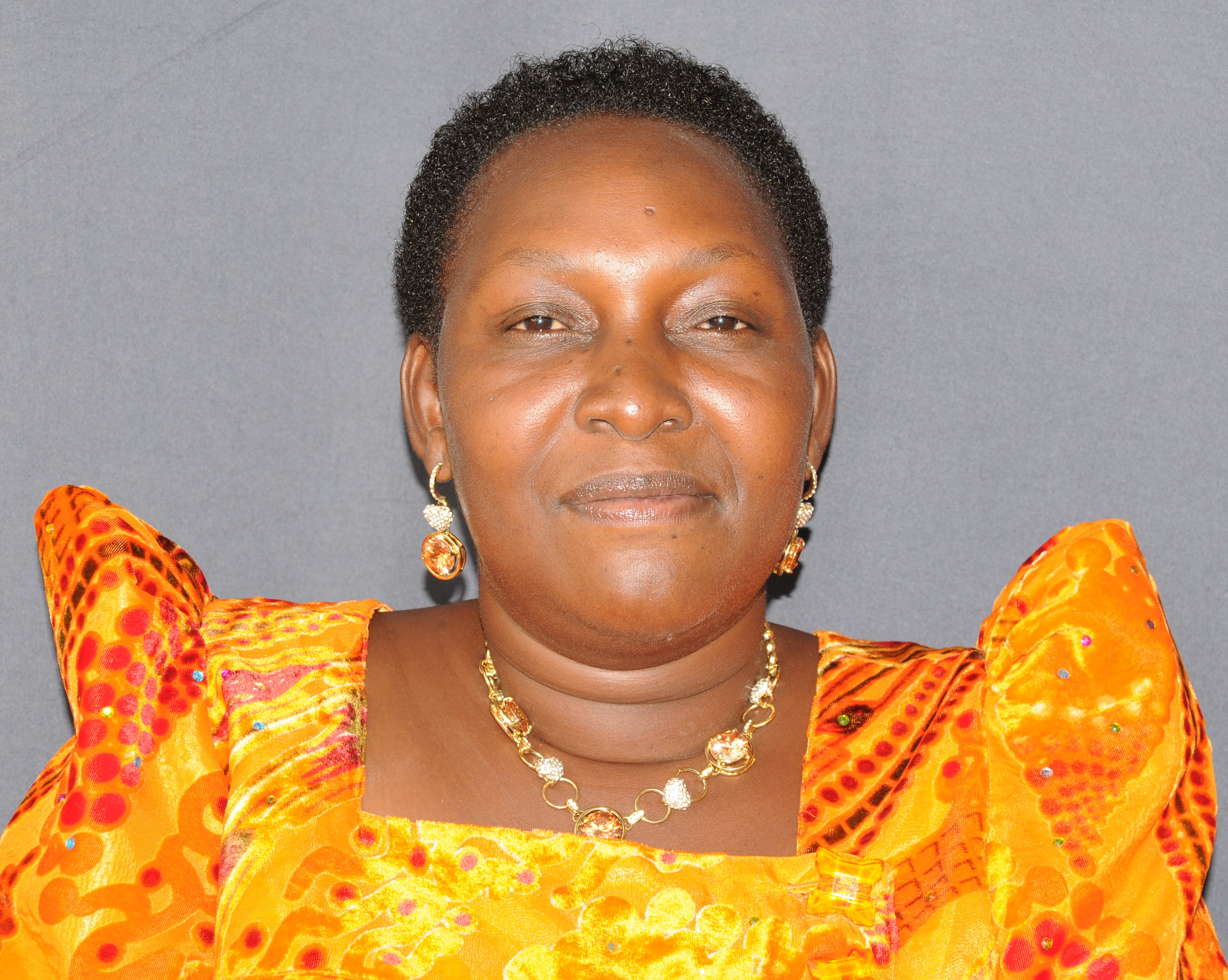
- Born: 20 May 1967 (age 59)
- Other name: Lukumu Ngonzi Abwooli
- Citizenship: Ugandan
- Education: National Institute of Education; Makerere University; Institute of Teacher Education Kyambogo
- Occupations: politician teacher
- Employer(s): Army Barracks Public School; Kamurasi Teachers College; Uganda Women Parliamentary Association; Parliament of Uganda; National Consultative Committee Fast-Tracking East African Federation
- Known for: Politics
- Political party: National Resistance Movement (NRM)

Jalia Bintu also known as Bintu Lukumu Ngonzi Abwooli Jalia (born 20 May 1967) is a female Ugandan politician and social worker/teacher affiliated to the National Resistance Movement political party. She is the district woman representative of Masindi district who has served in the eighth, ninth, and tenth Parliaments of Uganda.

== Early life and education ==
Jalia Bintu was born on 20 May 1967. She completed her Grade II Teaching Certificate in 1985 from National Institute of Education, Makerere University and later enrolled for Grade III Teaching Certificate at Institute of Teacher Education Kyambogo and completed in 1989. She joined the Institute of Teacher Education Kyambogo in 1993 to pursue a diploma in education. In 1999, she completed her bachelor's degree in arts from Makerere University and returned for her Master of Arts in peace and conflict studies in 2005 from the same university.

== Career ==
=== Beginnings ===
From 1986 to 1988, Jalia Bintu served as a teacher at Army Barracks Public School and later joined Kamurasi Teachers College between 1993 and 1994 as a tutor. She was the vice chairperson of Uganda Women Parliamentary Association (2004-2006). She worked at the Parliament of Uganda as the vice chairperson, Committee on Commissions, Statutory Authorities and State Enterprises (COSASE) in (2001-2004) and the chairperson, Committee on Equal Opportunities (2006-2008). In 2008, she was the observer at Juba peace talks. Jalia served on several roles as the member at National Consultative Committee Fast-Tracking East African Federation (2007), commissioner at Parliamentary Commission (2011-2013), and as the chairperson, Parliamentarians SACCO at the Parliament of Uganda (2015 to date).

=== Political career ===
From 2001 to date, Jalia Bintu has been a member of Parliament at the Parliament of Uganda. While at the Parliament of Uganda, Jalia has served on additional role as the member on Public Accounts Committee and Committee on Agriculture.

She was named among the MPs under the NRM who have been in Parliament for two or more terms but have failed to get the party flag and lost the 2021-2026 elections. She was undecided during the voting of Constitutional Amendment Bill, which contains a clause for the removal of the age limit. Bintu said she would first consult her people before she could take a position on the matter.

== Personal life ==
She is married. Her hobbies are reading books, playing netball, athletics, singing and dancing. She has special interests in helping the needy, planting trees and promotion of girl child education.

== See also ==
- List of members of the tenth Parliament of Uganda
- List of members of the eleventh Parliament of Uganda
- List of members of the ninth Parliament of Uganda
- List of members of the eighth Parliament of Uganda
- National Resistance Movement
- Parliament of Uganda
