= Kyokuhairwa Kyaka Vicky =

Ugandan politician

Hon. Viccy Kyaka Kyokuhairwa

Woman Member of Parliament for Isingiro District
- In office 2006–2008
- Constituency: Isingiro District

Personal details
- Died: 2008 Rubaale, Kabale–Mbarara Highway, Uganda
- Citizenship: Uganda
- Party: National Resistance Movement
- Occupation: Politician
- Known for: First councillor for Bukanga and legislator for Isingiro District
- Committees: Committee on Defence and Internal Affairs; Committee on Natural Resources; Public Accounts Committee

Kyokuhairwa Kyaka Viccy (d. 2008), also known as Vicky Kyaka Kyokuhairwa, was a Ugandan politician in the eighth Parliament of Uganda representing Isingiro District. She was the first councillor for Bukanga in the early 90s.

== Political life ==
Kyokuhairwa won the 2006 election in Isingiro district woman parliamentary seat with 94,258 votes. Her closest rival Kyokuhairwe Stella Masiko Kafureka polled 10,739, while Biriwuija Edith Mwebaze had 7,571 votes.

In 2008, Vicky died with a couple and two other people after their car collided with a Fuso truck at Rubaale on the Kabale-Mbarara highway. The other deceased were identified as Mathias Mulumba and his wife, Winnie. Kyokuhairwa was in the company of her mother-in-law and was admitted at Nkozi Hospital.

The Parliament also paid tribute to Viccy. which was moved by the Government Chief Whip, Kabakumba Matsiko, who said the late had distinguished herself as hardworking, vibrant and loyal to the ruling National Resistance Movement party. Vicky was also known by other MPs for being a developmental and a great mobilizer who believed in family unity and harmony, a great and empowered woman, a great legislator who had been a model for many women parliamentarians in the multiparty system and a prayerful woman who was attached to her family and constituency.

While at the Parliament, she served as a member on the Parliamentary Committees of Defence and Internal Affairs, Natural Resources, and the Public Accounts Committee.

== See also ==
- List of members of the eighth Parliament of Uganda
