= Hussein Kyanjo =

Ugandan politician (1960–2023)

Member of Parliament for Makindye West
- In office 2006–2016

Personal details
- Born: 1960
- Died: 22 July 2023 (aged 62–63)
- Party: Justice Forum (JEEMA)
- Education: Makerere University
- Occupation: Politician, Activist

Hajj Hussein Kyanjo (1960 – 22 July 2023) was a Ugandan politician, youth leader and human rights advocate. He served as the Member of Parliament (MP) for Makindye West constituency in Kampala from 2006 to 2016, and was a founding member and Secretary General emeritus of the Justice Forum (JEEMA) political party. Known for his vocal stance on issues such as good governance, environmental conservation, and youth empowerment, Kyanjo was a prominent opposition figure and an influential advocate for democracy in Uganda.

== Early life and education ==
Hussein Kyanjo was born in 1960. He attended Bilal Islamic School in Bwaise, Kako Primary School, and Masaka Secondary School. He later proceeded to Makerere University, where he graduated in 1983 with a Bachelor's degree in Industrial and Fine Art.

== Career ==
Kyanjo was among the founding members of the Justice Forum (JEEMA), a political party that champions democratic reforms and social justice in Uganda. He held the position of Secretary General emeritus within the party, contributing to its organization and political strategy.

In 2006, Kyanjo was elected as the Member of parliament for Makindye West, a position he held until 2016. During his time in Parliament, he was known for his strong advocacy on issues such as transparency, human rights, and the fight against corruption. He was a vocal critic of government policies that he perceived as oppressive or unjust.

Kyanjo also served as the Shadow Minister of Internal Affairs, where he was involved in oversight and policy critique relating to Uganda's security forces and internal governance. He advocated for reforms that would ensure equitable representation and accountability within Uganda’s security apparatus.

== Advocacy and activism ==
Throughout his career, Kyanjo was an outspoken advocate for environmental conservation. Notably, he opposed government plans to degazette the Mabira Forest Reserve for sugarcane plantations.

He was also a supporter of the cultural values and autonomy of the Buganda Kingdom.

Kyanjo’s advocacy extended to youth empowerment, where he pushed for policies and initiatives aimed at improving opportunities for Uganda’s young population, emphasizing education, employment, and political participation.

== Death and legacy ==
Kyanjo died on 22 July 2023 at Kibuli Muslim Hospital in Kampala after a prolonged illness. He was buried at his ancestral home in Bukomansimbi District, in keeping with family wishes.

Following his death, political figures including the Speaker of Parliament, Anita Among, and Deputy Speaker Thomas Tayebwa expressed their condolences and recognized Kyanjo’s contributions to Uganda's legislative history and justice advocacy.

== See also ==
- Muwada Nkunyingi
- Allan Ssewanyana
- Bobi Wine
- David Tinyefunza
- Abubaker Kawalya
