= Agnes Nabirye =

Ugandan politician

- Nabirye

Member of Parliament for Jinja District
- In office 2001–2021
- Succeeded by: Loy Katali

Resident District Commissioner of Buvuma District
- In office 2021–Present

Personal details
- Born: 17 July 1973 (age 53) Jinja District, Uganda
- Citizenship: Uganda
- Party: National Resistance Movement (NRM)

Agnes Nabirye (born on 17 July 1973) is a Ugandan politician who served as a member of parliament for Jinja District in Uganda.

== Background and education ==
Nabirye was born in Jinja District in the Eastern Region of Uganda. She worked as a tutor in various teacher training colleges and was elected as a councillor in Jinja District in 2001.

== Career ==
Nabirye served as a Jinja District Council Speaker and was elected as a member of Parliament representing women in the 9th parliament during the 2011 elections. She competed against six other candidates.

In 2021, Nabirye contested in the same constituency for the position of woman member of parliament of Jinja but was defeated by Loy Katali, the NRM flag bearer.

Nabirye was later appointed by the president of Uganda, Yoweri Kaguta Museveni, as the Resident District Commissioner (RDC) of Buvuma district.

== Personal details ==
Nabirye is a member of the NRM, the ruling party in Uganda. She competed against Moureen Kyalya Walube, who later filed a lawsuit accusing her of election rigging.
