= Nayiga Florence Ssekabira =

Ugandan politician

Hon. Nayiga Florence Ssekabira

Woman Member of Parliament for Kayunga District
- In office 2006–2011
- Succeeded by: Aidah Nantaba
- Constituency: Kayunga District

State Minister for Elderly and Disability Affairs
- In office 2001–2006
- President: Yoweri Museveni

National Woman Disability Member of Parliament

Personal details
- Born: Uganda
- Citizenship: Uganda
- Party: National Resistance Movement
- Occupation: Politician
- Known for: Advocacy for the rights of persons with disabilities and elderly people

Nayiga Florence Ssekabira is a Ugandan female politician, former State Minister for PWDs and Women Member of Parliament of Kayunga district in the eighth parliament on National Resistance Movement (NRM) political party ticket.

== Political career ==
Florence Nayiga Sekabira was the Honourable Minister of State for Elderly and Disability Affairs from 2001 to 2006, She won (was elected) National Woman Disability Member of Parliament after defeating Sophia Nalule, her competitor. Florence Nayiga Sekabira represented women of Kayunga in the eighth parliament but lost her seat to Hon. Nantaba Aidah Erios in the ninth parliament.

== Political contributions ==
State minister for the elderly and disability Florence Nayiga Sekabira advocated for the rights of persons with disabilities. Hon. Nayiga Florence Ssekabira distributed wealth creation capital such as seedlings to the people in Kayunga.

== See also ==
- Parliament of Uganda
- List of members of the eighth Parliament of Uganda
- Politics of Uganda
- Cabinet of Uganda
