= Mary Paula Kebirungi Turyahikayo =

Ugandan politician

- Born: 15 January 1961 (age 65)
- Occupation: Politician

Mary Paula Kebirungi Turyahikayo also known as Turyahikayo Kebirungi Mary Paula (born 15 January 1961) is a Ugandan politician and social scientist. She is the former woman Member of Parliament representative for Rubabo County, Rukungiri District under the National Resistance Movement political party ticket. She was the aspirant for 2021-2026 Mp for Rubabo county but lost the election to Namanya Naboth of FDC with only 20,287 votes.

== Education background ==
In 1974, she joined St Theresa Primary School for her Primary Leaving Examinations and later joined Immaculate Heart Girls Senior Secondary School to obtain her Uganda Certificate of Education in 1978. She was awarded Uganda Advanced Certificate of Education from Kibuli Secondary School in 1980 and was admitted at Makerere University to acquire her bachelor's degree of Arts in Social Sciences (Political Science, Sociology) in 1984. In 1997, she had a Postgraduate Certificate in Management from Uganda Management Institute. Mary later returned to Uganda Management Institute to acquire her Post graduate Diploma in Management (2000) and Master of Public Health Leadership(2009).

== Career before politics ==
She was the teacher and head, history department at Baptist High School, Mombasa, Kenya (1986–1988) and Afraha High School, Nakuru, Kenya (1988–1990). In 1994, she joined Africa Science Technology Exchange as the programme associate and later joined Ministry of Health and served as the administrator (1998-2004) and assistant Coordinator, Public Sector(2004-2005). She was also employed as the Assistant Public Sector coordinator for the Global Fund to fight AIDS, TB, Malaria (2004 - 2005) and research assistant at African Energy Policy Research Network, and a history and geography teacher in Kenyan schools.

== Political life ==
From 2006 to 2021, she served as the Member of Parliament at the Parliament of Uganda in the eighth, ninth and tenth Parliament. She defeated Makerere University Chancellor and former minister, Prof. Mondo Kagonyera, to become Rubabo MP in 2001.

While at the Parliament of Uganda, she served on additional roles as the member on Committee on Commissions, State Authorities and State Enterprises and Business Committee.

== Personal life ==
She is married. Her hobbies are listening to Gospel, visiting friends, travelling and debating. She has special interests in promoting health services and youth women empowerment.

== See also ==
- Rukungiri District
- List of members of the tenth Parliament of Uganda
- List of members of the eighth Parliament of Uganda
- List of members of the ninth Parliament of Uganda
- National Resistance Movement
- Parliament of Uganda
- Member of Parliament
