= Kwebiha Joyce =

Ugandan politician

Joyce Kwebiha Abwooli Joyce Mama Mission

Woman Member of Parliament for Kyenjojo District
- In office 2006–2011

Personal details
- Died: 16 February, 2026 Buhinga Hospital, Uganda
- Party: Independent
- Occupation: Politician, Radio Director
- Known for: Woman MP for Kyenjojo District (8th Parliament); Director, Kyenjojo Development Radio; Advocacy for peace during the 2021 election period; Survivor of political intimidation and threats (2007)

Kwebiha Joyce sometimes referred to as Kwebiha Joyce Mama Mission was an Ugandan politician. She was an Independent candidate for the Women Representative (MP) for Kyenjojo District in the eighth Parliament of Uganda. Joyce Kwebiiha Abwooli died on, 16th February 2026, at Buhinga Hospital.

== Career ==
She is the director of Kyenjojo Development Radio.

== Politics ==
At the opening of the National Unity Platform Office in Kyenjojo in November 2020, Joyce was the guest of honour. She requested peace and harmony during and after the 2021 election period despite the political differences among Ugandans during and after the political season.

In 2007, a year when Joyce joined the 8th Parliament of Uganda as a woman Member of Parliament of Uganda, she received death threats from supporters of one of the candidates in the district Local Council 5 chairperson by-elections. Joyce said that her death threats were a result of allegations that she was campaigning for one of the candidates in the elections. These death threats also included threats of burning down Kyenjojo Development Radio, a radio station of which she is a director.

Later in the next parliament, 28-year-old Linda Timbigamba beat the incumbent, Joyce Kwebiha, with 24,922 votes for the Kyenjojo Woman Member of Parliament seat, while Kwebiha got 20,106 votes. She was followed by Miriam Kesiime with 14,123 votes, and Theresa Kabasinguzi came last with 11,911.

== See also ==
- List of members of the eighth Parliament of Uganda.
