= Akumu Catherine Mavenjina =

Ugandan lawyer and politician

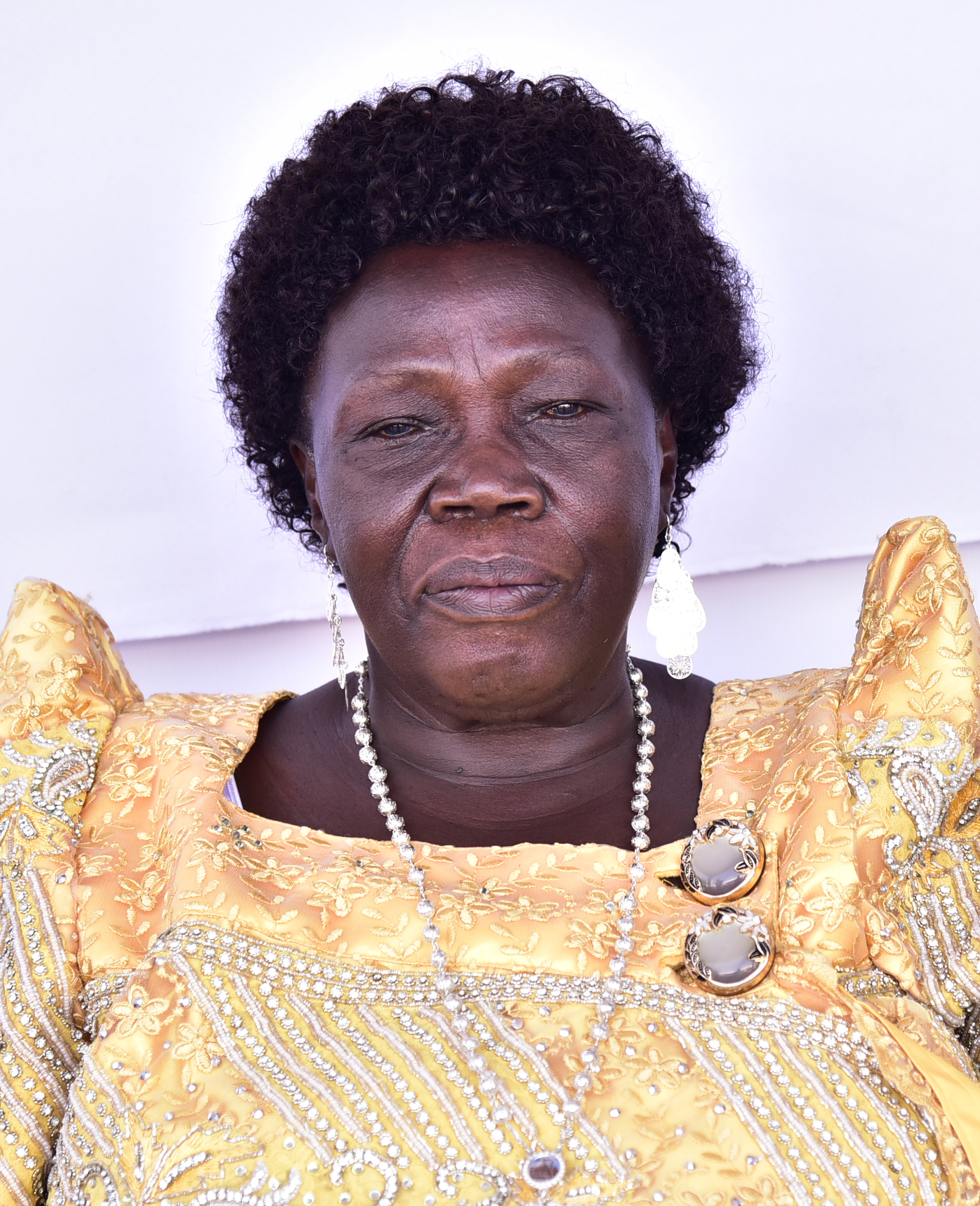
- Akumu Catherine Mavenjina

Older Persons' Representative for Northern Region
- In office 2021–2026

Woman Member of Parliament for Nebbi District
- In office 2006–2011

State Minister for Public Service

Personal details
- Born: Nebbi District, Uganda
- Party: National Resistance Movement (NRM)
- Occupation: Lawyer; Politician
- Profession: Magistrate (former)
- Known for: Representation of Nebbi District; advocacy for women's rights; leadership in Older Persons' affairs

Akumu Catherine Mavenjina is a Ugandan lawyer, politician from Nebbi District, Uganda. She was a Woman Representative in the 8th Parliament of Uganda 2006–2011. She is a former state minister and currently the representative for Older Persons' Representing the Northern regions of Uganda in the 11th Parliament of Uganda. She is affiliated to National Resistance Movement (NRM).

== Career ==
Before joining politics, she served as a magistrate. She was the State Minister for Public Service.

In the 8th Parliament, Mavenjina represented Nebbi District as the Woman Member of Parliament. Throughout her tenure and during her, she participated in legislative matters, championed women's rights, and addressed the community's needs. She lost to Agnes Acibu in the 2021 general election as the Woman Member of Parliament Representing Nebbi District. She is currently the Older Persons' Representative for the Northern region in the 11th Parliament (2021–2026). Mavenjina also served as the chairperson of the organizing committee for the 2024 Martyrs' Day celebration in Nebbi.

== Controversy and defamation lawsuit ==
In 2003, Mavenjina brought a defamation lawsuit against Monitor Publications, claiming that they had defamed her. However, the case was ultimately dismissed by the High Court judge due to a lack of evidence supporting her allegations.

== See also ==
- Agnes Acibu
- Neebi District
- National Resistance Movement
- Parliament of Uganda.
- Member of Parliament
- Uganda Martyrs'Day
