= Akello Judith Franca =

Ugandan female politician (born 1978)

- Born: 17 August 1978 (age 48)
- Citizenship: Ugandan
- Education: Lacek-Ocot Primary School, Atanga Senior Secondary School, Sacred Heart S.S. Gulu, Makerere University
- Occupations: Politician, Economist and Teacher
- Political party: Forum for Democratic Change

Akello Judith Franca (born 17 August 1978) is a Ugandan politician and economist. She was the district woman representative of Agago in the eighth, ninth and tenth Parliament of Uganda. In the eleventh Parliament, she stood for Woman MP for Agago but lost with 26,840 votes. She was affiliated to the Forum for Democratic Change political party in the 10th Parliament. She was also the National Resistance Movement member.

== Education ==
In 1993, she sat for her Primary Leaving Examination at Lacek-Ocot Primary School. In 1997, she was awarded a Uganda Certificate Of Education from Atanga S.S. and later joined Sacred Heart S.S. Gulu for her Uganda Advanced Certificate and completed in 1999. She holds bachelor's degree in Education from Makerere University and obtained it in 2004. She was later awarded a master's degree in Economic Policy Management in 2009 from Makerere University.

== Career life before politics ==
From 1998 to 2001, she worked as the assistant field officer at Uganda Red Cross Society. Between 1999 and 2001, she served as a teacher at Pajule S.S. From 2017 to date, she was employed as the secretary general at Uganda Parliamentary Forum on Children. She also worked as a teacher between 2003 and 2005 from Kisugu Secondary School, Muyenga.

== Political journey ==
Before joining the Parliament of Uganda as the Member of Parliament from 2006 to 2021, Judith also served at the Parliament of Uganda on several positions. In 2006 till 2011, she was employed as the Deputy Opposition Chief Whip at the Parliament of Uganda. Judith later worked as the Shadow Minister of Education and Sports from 2011 to 2013. From 2013 to 2016, she was the secretary general, Uganda Women Parliamentary Association. Between 2013 and 2016, she was the Uganda Delegate to the International Parliamentary Association and later became the Uganda Delegate to the Commonwealth Parliamentary Association from 2016 to date. From 2017 to date, Judith served as the vice chairperson, Parliamentary Forum on Public Finance at the Parliament of Uganda.

== Other responsibilities ==
She serves on the Committee on Finance, Planning and Economic Development and on the Public Accounts Committee at the Parliament of Uganda besides being a Member of Parliament.

== Personal life ==
She is married. Her hobbies are sports and reading.

== See also ==
- Beatrice Akello Akori
- List of members of the tenth Parliament of Uganda
- List of members of the eighth Parliament of Uganda
- List of members of the ninth Parliament of Uganda
- Member of Parliament
- Parliament of Uganda
