= Jacqueline Kyatuheire =

Former Member of Parliament for Kanungu District from 2002 - 2011

Parliament of Uganda
- In office 2002–2011
- Preceded by: ?
- Succeeded by: Elizabeth Karungi

Personal details
- Born: May 30, 1973 (age 53) Kanungu District, Uganda
- Party: National Resistance Movement

Jacqueline Kyatuheire (born 30 May 1973) is a Ugandan sociologist and politician. She is a former member of the Parliament of Uganda representing the Kanungu District under the National Resistance Movement from 2002 to 2011 when she was defeated by Elizabeth Karungi.

== Early life and education ==
Jacqueline was born on 30 May 1973 in Kanungu district from a family of five girls in village near the Democratic Republic of Congo. She was brought up by her single mother.

Jacqueline graduated with a bachelor of Arts degree in Social Science in 1997.

== Social life. ==
In March 2004, Jacqueline launched the constitution of Bishop Comboni old students Association in Kampala.

She founded St Teresa all girls boarding school.

== Political career ==
Before joining politics, Jacqueline was the assistant chief administrative officer for Rukungiri district.

She won the Kanungu district woman parliamentary seat with 2,859 votes beating Catherine Musinguzi who got 2,325 votes. She was among the mobilisers of Kanungu district Image Group, that met President Museveni at state house in Entebbe to show their assurance in supporting him in the 2016 candidature.

Jacqueline serves as the NRM deputy national treasurer, a position she was nominated by Yoweri Kaguta Museveni who is the NRM chairperson and approved by the Central Executive Committee in June 2020, replacing Keneth Omona.

== See also ==
List of members of the eighth Parliament of Uganda
