= Ssinabulya Sylvia Namabidde =

Ugandan politician

- Born: 24 December 1964 (age 61)
- Citizenship: Ugandan
- Occupation: Politician
- Notable work: Introduced new maternal care legislation and initiated new legislation in Uganda to get maternal care on Uganda’s budget for the first time

Ssinabulya Sylvia Namabidde (24 December 1964) is a Ugandan politician. She became the Member of Parliament for Mityana district in 2001. She served in the eighth and ninth Parliament of Uganda under the National Resistance Movement political party.

== Career ==
Namabidde is qualified in the areas of education, management, and public health in the government and civil society sector. Within the national political policy, she introduced new maternal care legislation and initiated new legislation in Uganda to get maternal care on Uganda's budget for the first time. She is known for her advocacy on behalf of mothers. Namabidde, who is also a women's activists, promotes the reproductive health and save the lives of mothers and their newborn babies. In 2006, she was dismayed that the government had not taken the issue of maternal and infant mortality seriously.

Ssinabulya is the chairperson of Network of African Women Ministers and Parliamentarians. She is the committee chairperson of Cheza which was registered on January 22, 2014, and officially launched by the commissioner for Education and Sports on July 28, 2014. The first school to embrace the game was Greenhill Academy. Cheza also known as Okwepena (Luganda) is a game that almost every young girl played, everywhere, even by the roadside.

She is the newly appointed Chairperson Mityana District Service Commission.

== See also ==
- List of members of the eighth Parliament of Uganda
