= Kiboijana Margaret N =

Ugandan politician

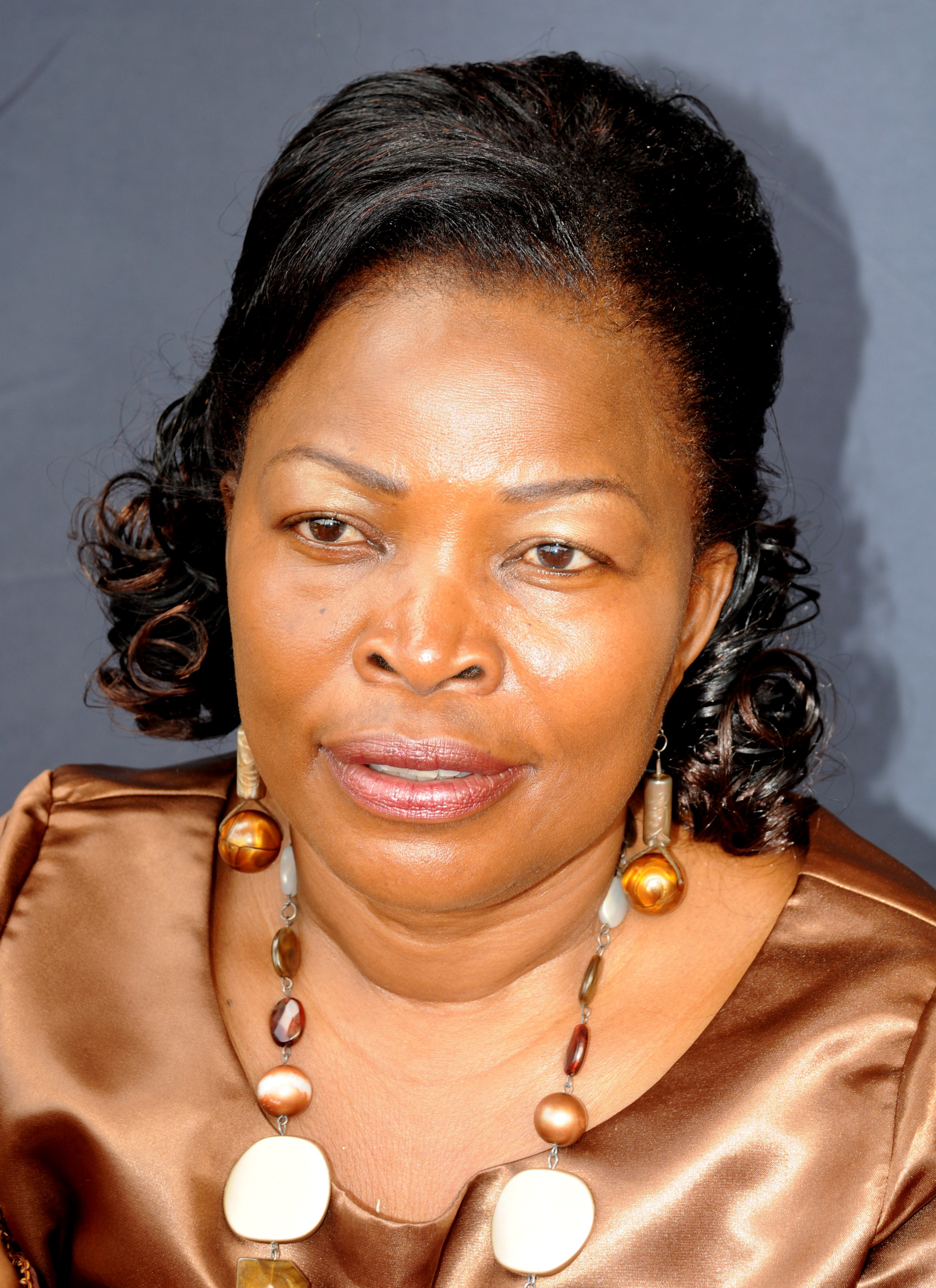
- Other name: Kiboijana Margaret Namara
- Occupation: Politician
- Political party: Forum for Democratic Change
- Movement: National Resistance Movement

Kiboijana Margaret N sometimes referred to as Kiboijana Margaret Namara is a Ugandan politician who served as the Member of Parliament of Uganda in the eighth and ninth Parliament of Uganda under the Forum for Democratic Change in Ibanda District.

== Politics ==
She was among the Members of Parliament who opposed to the proposal of the anti bail law describing it as unconstitutional. The constitutional amendment proposal by President Museveni to deny bail to rioters, among other offenders was being debated in the ruling party’s caucus. She was also one of the aspiring Woman MP for 2021-2026, Ibanda District under the NRM political party. She was among the NRM nominated candidates in the 2020 primaries by electoral commission. Margaret is an anti-poverty crusader and has supplied coffee seedlings, goats and pigs to the residents of Ibanda District. Kiboijana has given support to a number of SACCOs, schools and churches.

== See also ==
- List of members of the eighth Parliament of Uganda
- List of members of the ninth Parliament of Uganda
