= Masiko Winifred Komuhangi =

Ugandan politician

- Winfred Matsiko Komuhangi
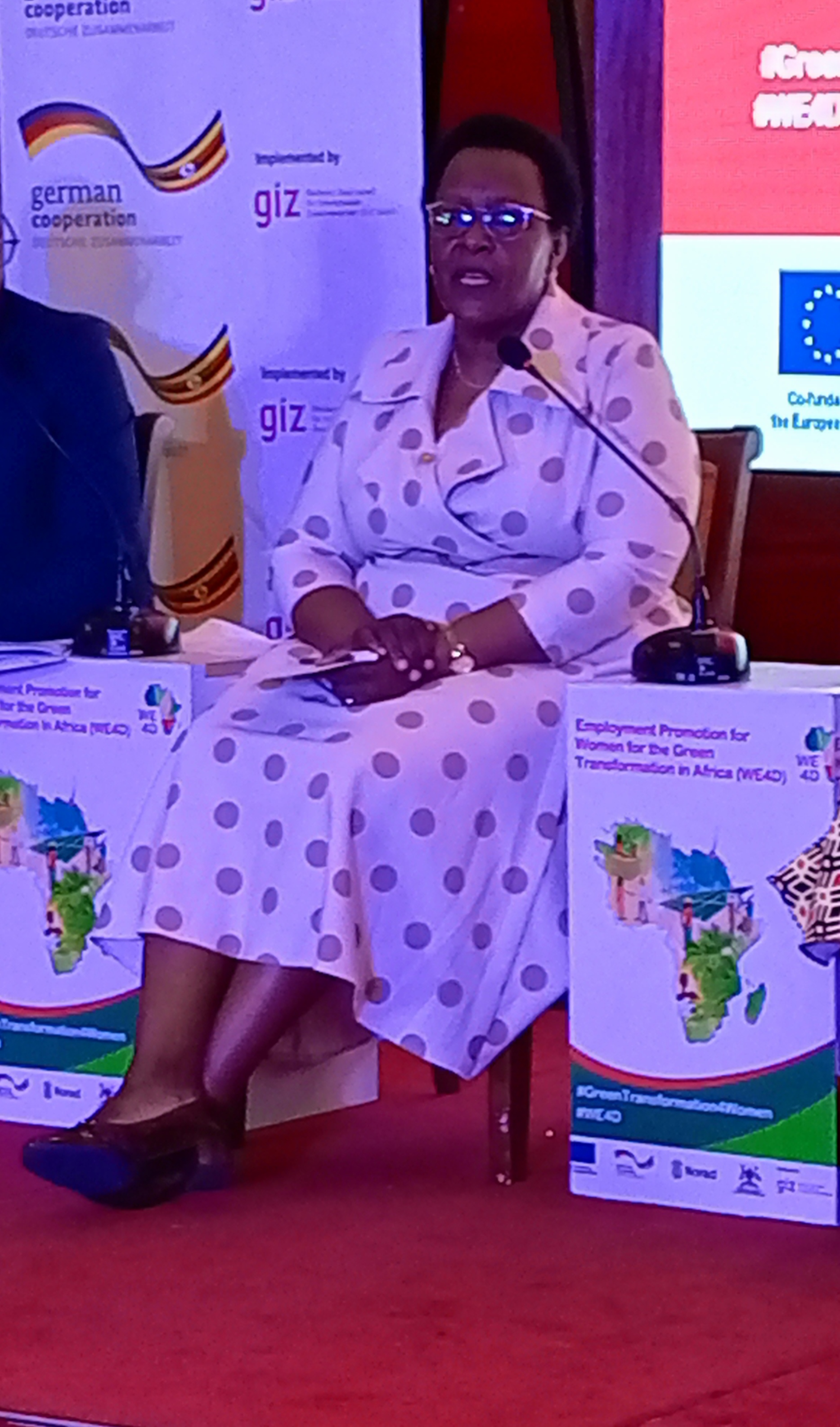
- Citizenship: Ugandan
- Employer: Parliament of Uganda
- Known for: Ugandan politician
- Notable work: Politics

Masiko Winifred Komuhangi, also spelt as Winfred Matsiko Komuhangi or Winnie Matsiko, is a Ugandan politician. She was the National Resistance Movement political party representative of Rukungiri District in the eighth, ninth and tenth Parliament of Uganda.

== Controversy ==
In 2002, Masiko Winifred Komuhangi and Babihuga J. Winnie were involved in a court case regarding the Standard of Proof in Electoral Offense. During Uganda's seventh Parliament, Komuhangi, the Rukungiri Member of Parliament, lost her seat following an election petition filed by her predecessor, Winifred Babihuga. The court nullified her election.

On July 9, Masiko petitioned the High Court to nullify Betty Bamukwatsa Muzanira's victory, alleging electoral irregularities. Masiko sought a fresh election. Muzanira, representing the Forum for Democratic Change (FDC), received 50,611 votes, while Masiko, from the National Resistance Movement, obtained 46,379 votes. Independent candidate and former cabinet minister Sezi Prisca Mbaguta secured 993 votes, and the Progressive People’s Party’s Kakundakwe Fabith received 183. Justice Moses Kazibwe presided over the case, found the petition and evidence lacking in merit, and dismissed it with no costs.

A total of six candidates who were nominated for the by-election in the Rukungiri District including; FDC's Betty Muzanira, NRM's Winifred Matsiko, Fabith Kukundakwe of People's Progressive Party's and independent candidates Sheila Atukunda Kirebete, Seith Mbaguta and Elizabeth Rwakitonera. NRM lost the bi-election twice with Masiko Winifred Komuhangi contesting. This is because in 2018, the citizens express anger over the NRM's abuse of its numbers in parliament to pass an amendment to the constitution lifting the 75 year age cap on the president. In 2018, the Court of Appeal threw out Winnie Matsiko out of parliament after a successful challenge by FDC's Betty Muzanira. The court found that Matsiko bribed voters by contributing money to different churches during campaigns. The court also faulted the Electoral Commission for failure to adhere to electoral laws relating to tallying of results before it declared Matsiko winner.

== See also ==
- List of members of the eighth Parliament of Uganda
- List of members of the ninth Parliament of Uganda
- Winifred Kiiza
- Joyce Bagala
- List of members of the tenth Parliament of Uganda
- Rukungiri
- National Resistance Movement
