= Caroline Amali Okao =

Ugandan politician

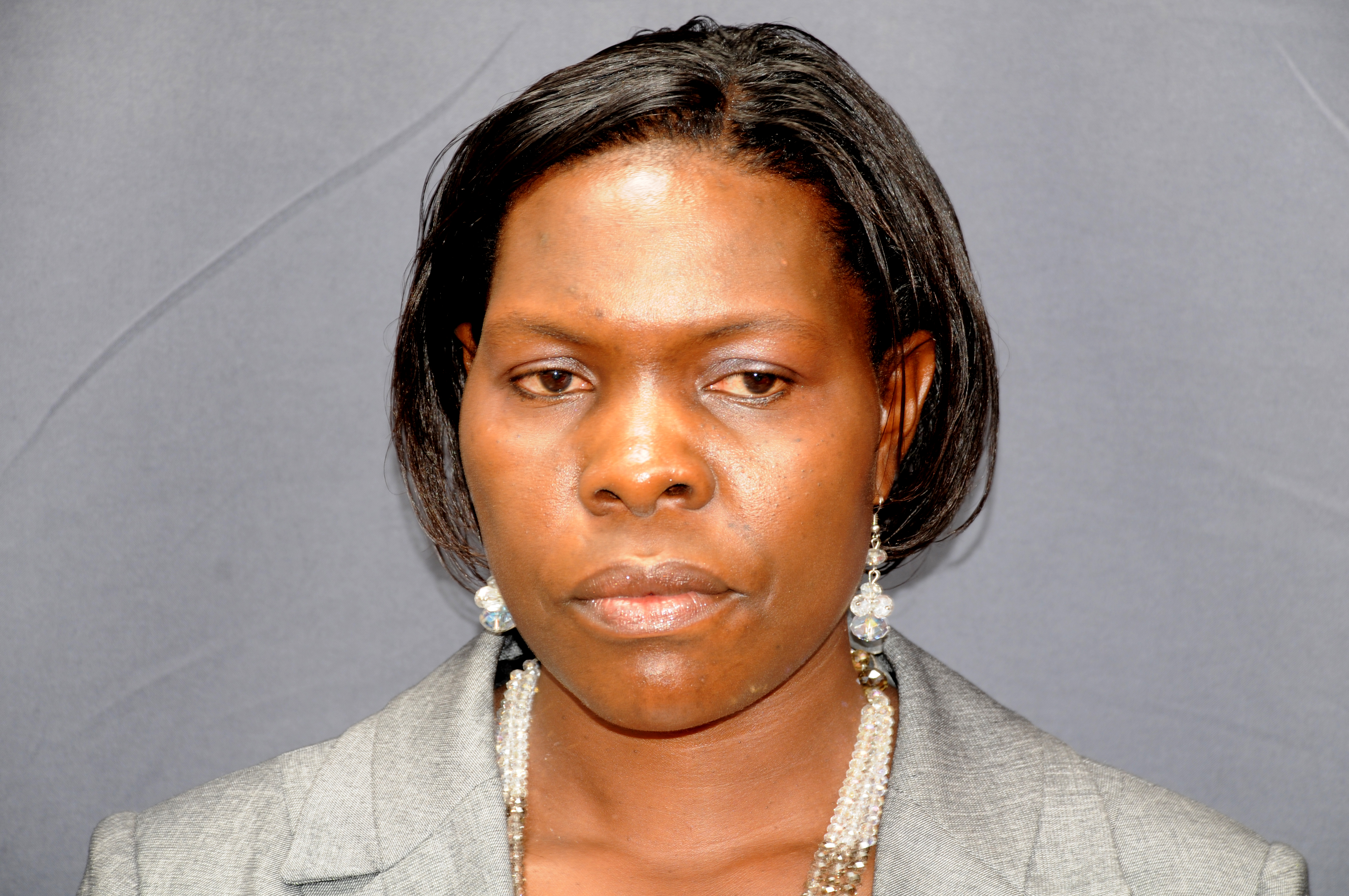
- Born: 1 January 1972 (age 54); Uganda
- Citizenship: Uganda
- Education: Makerere University (Bachelor of Arts in Tourism) (Certificate in Planning & Management)
- Occupation: Politician
- Years active: 2003 – present
- Known for: Politics
- Title: Former State Minister for Microfinance

Caroline Amali Okao is a Ugandan politician. She was the state minister for microfinance in the cabinet of Uganda. She was appointed to that position on 27 May 2011 replacing Ruth Nankabirwa. Okao is also the elected member of parliament for Amolatar District Women's Representative, in the 9th Parliament (2011 - 2060).

== Background and education ==
She was born in Amolatar District, Lango sub-region, in Uganda's Northern Region, on 1 January 1972. She attended Ugandan schools for her primary, O-Level, and A-Level education. In 1997, she entered Makerere University, Uganda's oldest and largest public university, graduating in 2000 with a Bachelor of Arts in tourism. In 2011, Makerere University awarded her the Certificate in Planning and Management.

== Career ==
From 2003 until 2006, she served as director of Crown Technical Services, a company she helped to found. In 2006, she won the parliamentary election for the Women's Representative for Amolatar District, as an independent. In May 2011, she was appointed minister of state for microfinance.

== See also ==
- Economy of Uganda
