= Theopista Sekitto Ntale =

Ugandan banker (born 1970)

- Born: 1970 (age 55–56); Uganda
- Citizenship: Ugandan
- Education: National University of Lesotho (Bachelor of Arts in Political Science and Public Administration); Makerere University (Master of Arts in Gender and Women Studies)
- Occupations: Banker, Social Entrepreneur & Philanthropist
- Years active: 2003 — present
- Title: Africa Ambassador of Global Banking Alliance for Women & Uganda Country Director of New Faces New Voices.

Theopista Sekitto Ntale, (née Theopista Sekitto), is a Ugandan banker, social entrepreneur and philanthropist, who serves an ambassador of Global Banking Alliance for Women, on the African continent. She also concurrently serves as the Uganda Country Director of New Faces New Voices, an international non-profit, that aims to empower African women and improve their economic and social well-being.

== Early life and education ==
Theopista was born in the Buganda Region of Uganda. In 1992, she obtained a Bachelor of Arts degree in Political Science and Public Administration, from the National University of Lesotho. Later, she was awarded a Master of Arts degree in Gender Studies, by Makerere University, Uganda's oldest and largest public university.

== Career ==
In February 2003, Ssekitto Ntale was recruited by Standard Chartered Uganda, serving there for nearly five years until September 2007. In October 2007, she transferred to DFCU Bank, where she served for nearly seven years, rising to the position of Head of Wholesale Banking and to the rank of senior vice president.

Effective April 2010, Theopista has served as the Country Director for Uganda, of New Faces New Voices, a pro-women non-profit, established by Graca Machel.

== Family ==
Theopista, (Theo to her close friends), has been affected personally by HIV/AIDS, which claimed the life of seven immediate family members, including her late father in 1990. She travels the world to share her experience and render advise on how to deal with the epidemic.

== Other consideration ==
In 2013, Theopista Sekitto Ntale was named one of the "2013 World of Difference 100". She also serves on a number of national and international boards including the Federation of African Women Educationists (Uganda) (FAWE Uganda).

== See also ==
- Annet Nakawunde Mulindwa
- Geraldine Ssali Busuulwa
