= Financial Alliance for Women =

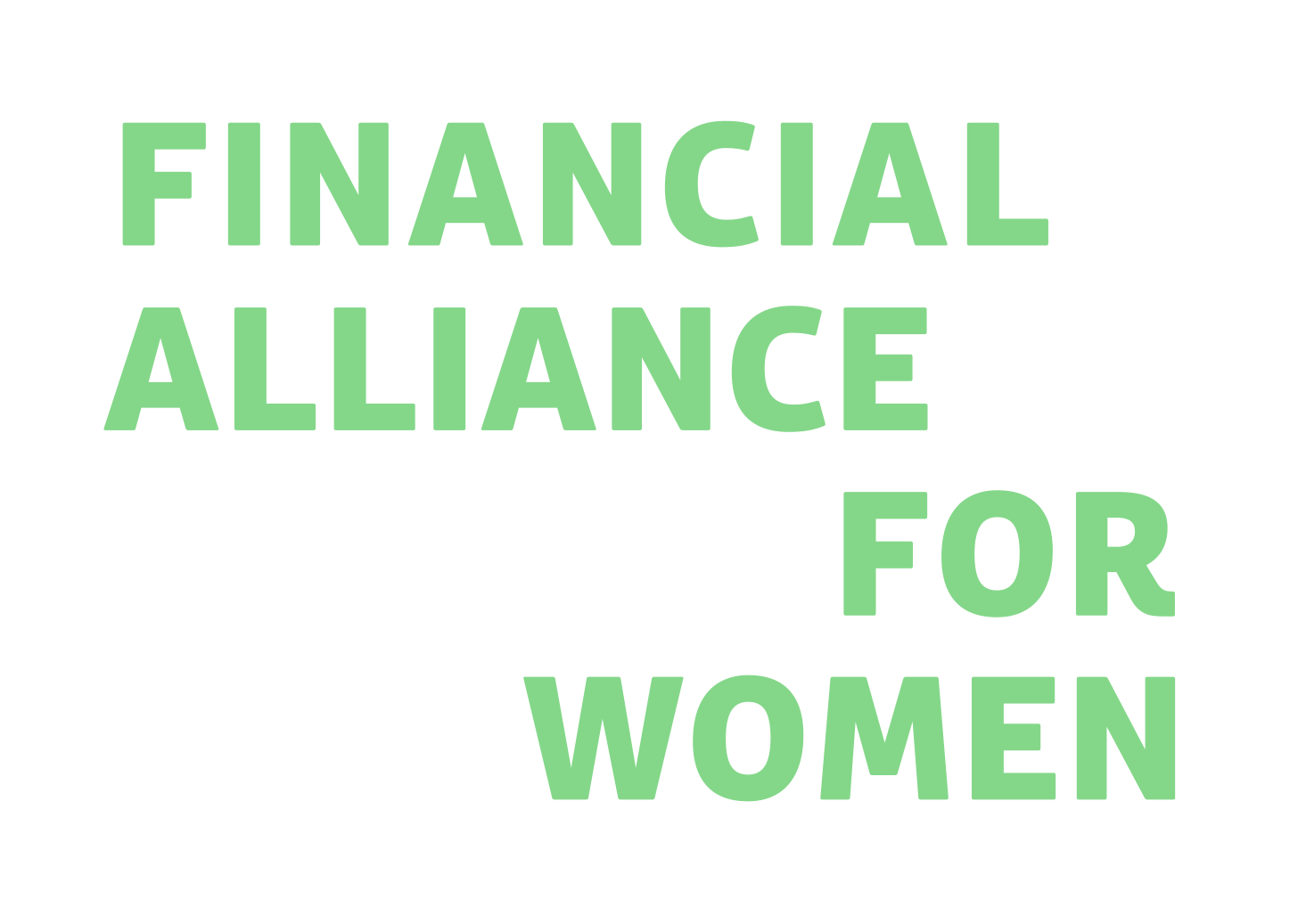
- Formation: 2000; 26 years ago
- Type: Nonprofit
- Headquarters: Brooklyn, New York
- Website: https://www.financialallianceforwomen.org

The Financial Alliance for Women (formerly the Global Banking Alliance for Women or GBA) is a non-profit organization working as an international consortium of financial institutions interested in the female economy. Its members work in more than 135 countries to build programs that support women with access to capital, information, education, and markets. The organization is headquartered in Brooklyn, New York.

== History and leadership ==
The Alliance was established in 2000 by a network of banks. In November 2012, Inez Murray was appointed as its chief executive officer. She previously worked for Women's World Banking. The Alliance is also guided by a governing board.

== Services and programs ==
The Alliance works with a range of financial institutions to bank women and support women entrepreneurs. Members include Westpac in Australia, BLC Bank in Lebanon, Access Bank in Nigeria, Standard Chartered and NatWest Group in the United Kingdom, Banco Popular in the United States, Itaú Unibanco in Brazil, and the European Bank for Reconstruction and Development.

The Alliance partners with Data2X to coordinate the Women's Financial Inclusion Data (WFID) Partnership.

The Alliance also holds an annual summit to discuss ways to advance women's financial inclusion around the world.

== Sponsors ==
The Financial Alliance for Women is sponsored by:

- Data2X
- FMO
- International Development Research Centre
- The International Finance Corporation
