= Loy Katali =

Ugandan politician

- Born: 12 October 1975 (age 50)
- Citizenship: Ugandan
- Education: Bachelor's degree in commerce and Masters of Business Administration from Makerere University
- Occupations: Politician and Accountant
- Years active: 2012-Date
- Political party: National Resistance Movement (NRM)
- Opponent: Peace Tibyaze,

Loy Katali (born 12 October 1975) is a Ugandan politician and accountant. She is the district woman representative of Jinja District in the 10th Parliament of Uganda. She is affiliated to the National Resistance Movement political party.

== Education background ==
In 2000, she was awarded a bachelor's degree in commerce from Makerere University. In 2008, she obtained a certificate from Association of Chartered Certified Accountants, UK and later completed Masters of Business Administration from Makerere University in 2009.

== Career history ==
From 2012 to 2015, she worked as the finance officer at IGAD and later joined Ministry of Labour, Republic of South Sudan as a consultant (financial management specialist) from 2009 to 2011. Loy was then the financial accountant at The Microfinance Support Centre Ltd from 2004 to 2008. Between 2003 and 2004, she was the accountant coordinator at the Directorate of Water Development. In the period 2001–2003, she was employed as the Project Accountant at Uganda Bureau of Statistics. Between 2000 and 2001, she worked as the management accountant at CELFMARK. Loy later joined the Parliament of Uganda as the member of Parliament from 2016 to date. While at the Parliament of Uganda, she served on the professional body at the Institute of Certified Public accountants of Uganda and Association of Chartered Certified Accountants, UK as a full-time member. Additionally, she served on the Committee on Finance, Planning and Economic Development as the vice chairperson.

== Personal life ==
She is married. She has special interest in helping those in need such as the widows and orphans.

== See also ==
- List of members of the tenth Parliament of Uganda
- National Resistance Movement
- Jinja District
- Parliament of Uganda
