= Susan Amero =

Female Ugandan member of parliament

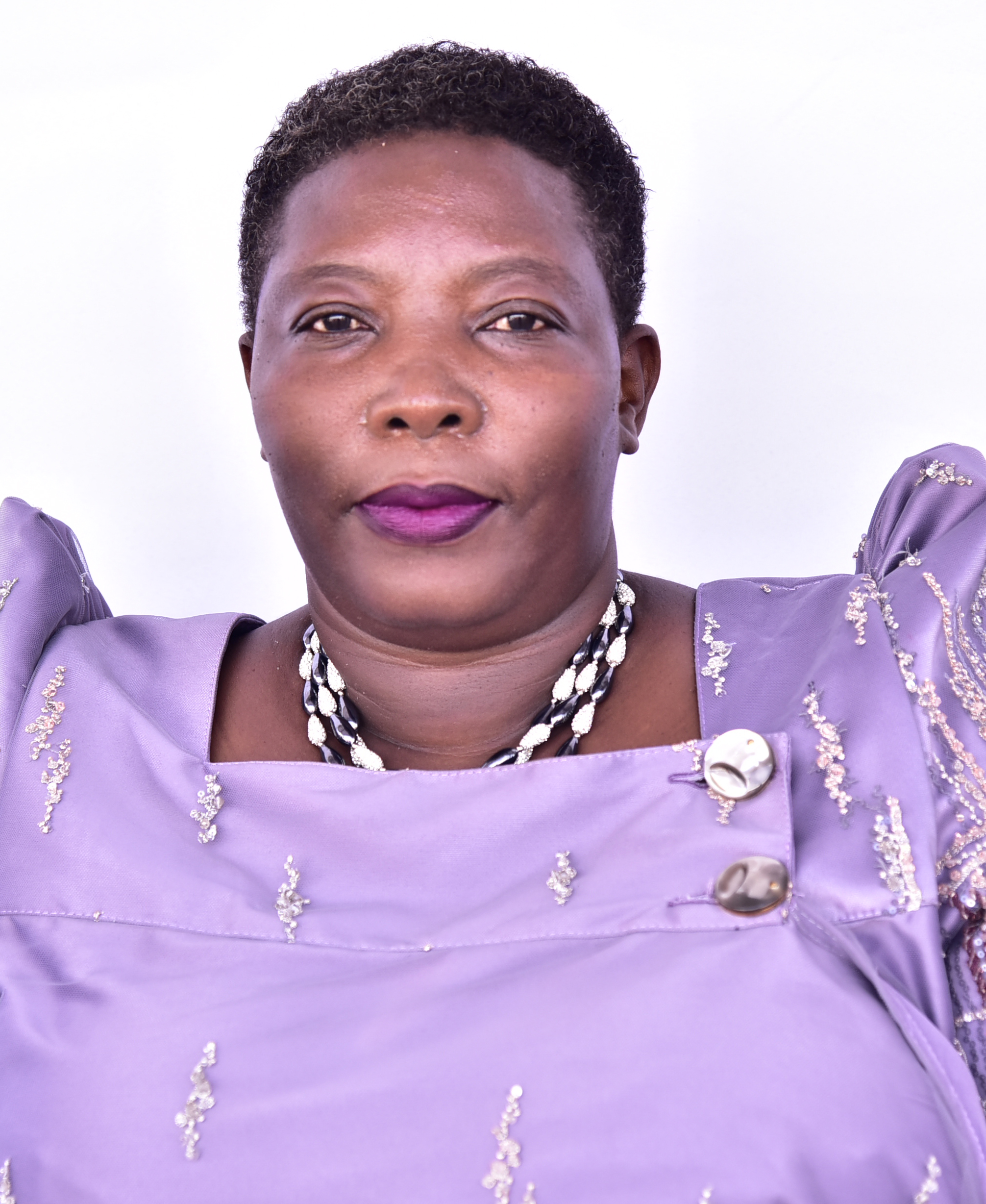
- Born: 17 April 1976 (age 50)
- Citizenship: Ugandan
- Education: Rock View Primary School in Tororo District, St. Francis School for the Blind in Madera, Mbale Secondary School, Nkumba University
- Occupation: Politician
- Years active: 1998-Date
- Political party: National Resistance Movement (NRM)

Susan Amero (born 17 April 1976) is a female Ugandan member of parliament for the Amuria district, she is a member of the ruling National Resistance Movement political party.

Susan Amero represented the Amuria District as the District Woman Representative in the 11th Parliament of Uganda (2021–2026) under the National Resistance Movement (NRM).

She did not contest in the 2026 January elections, as she declared plans to focus on her farming projects as her major financial sources.

== Education ==
Amero completed her Primary Leaving Examination at Rock View Primary School in 1989 in Tororo district. In 1993, she finished her Uganda Certificate of Education at St. Francis School for the Blind in Madera. She completed her Uganda Advanced Certificate from Mbale Secondary School in 1996.

Between 1996 and 1997, Amero completed certificates in Tour and Travel Operator and IATA/UFTAA at Airway Tours and Travel, Switzerland. In 2007, she graduated with a Bachelor of International Relations and Diplomacy at Nkumba University, a private university in Entebbe, Uganda. She also completed her Master of Arts in International Relations at Nkumba University.

== Work ==
In 1998, Amero worked as a sales executive and receptionist. Between 1999 and 2009, she was a VIP assistant at the Ugandan Civil Aviation Authority. From 2011 to date, she has been a member of parliament.

== Committees ==
Amero serves on the following committees in the Ugandan parliament:

- National Economy
- Presidential Affairs (vice-chairperson)

== See also ==
- List of members of the eleventh Parliament of Uganda.
- Abubakar Jeje Odongo
- Musa Francis Ecweru
- Amuria District
