= Alice Alaso =

Ugandan teacher and politician

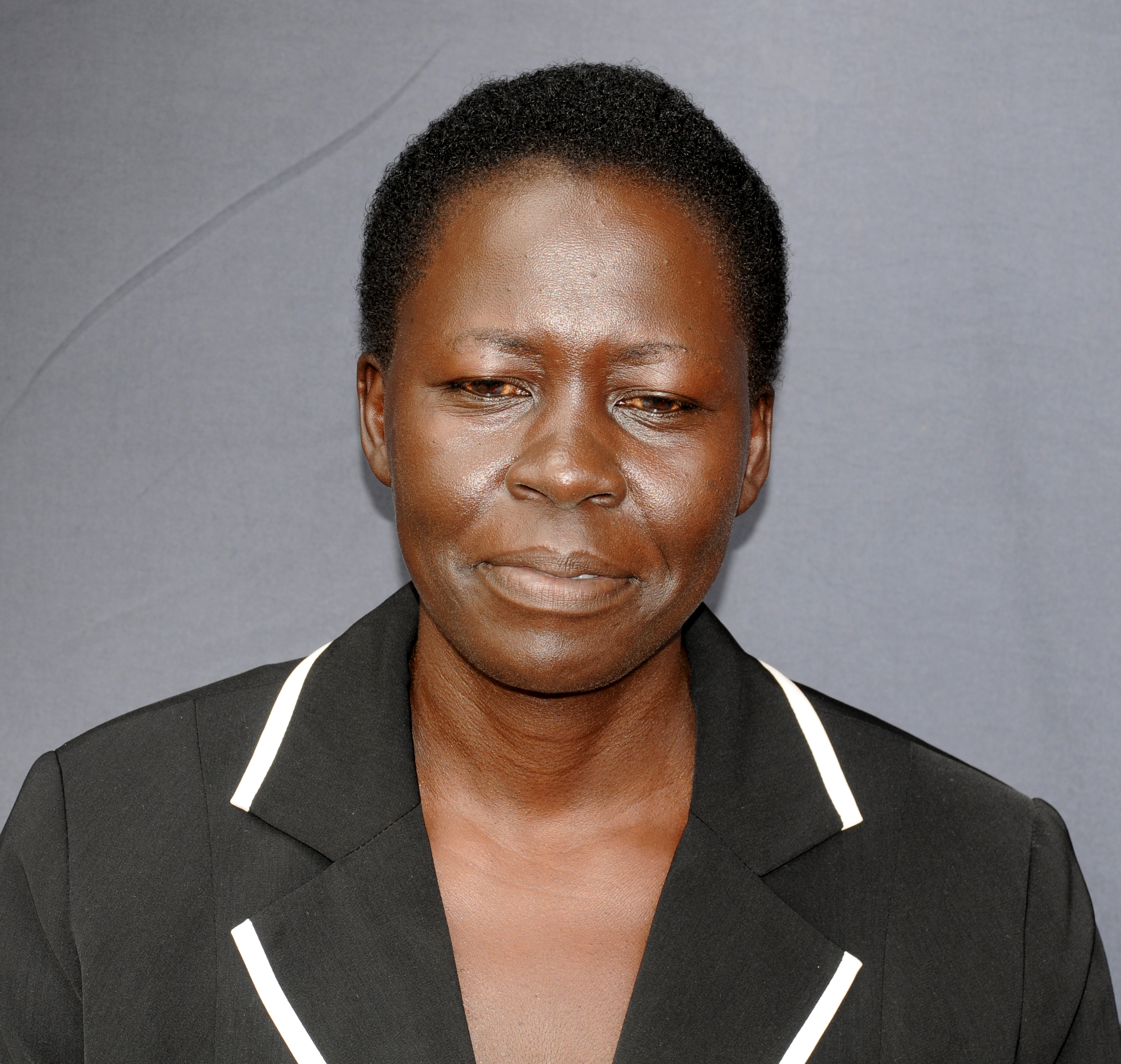
- Born: January 21, 1969 (age 57); Serere District
- Education: Makerere University
- Occupations: politician, teacher
- Notable work: Woman Representative for Serere District in Uganda's eighth, ninth and tenth parliaments.; As a teacher, Alaso taught at Teso College Aloet between 1993 and 1997.
- Political party: Alliance for National Transformation
- Spouse: Johnson Ebaju (2007)

Alice Alaso (sometimes referred to as Alice Alaso Asianut) (born 21 January 1969) is a Ugandan teacher and politician who was the Woman Representative for Serere District in Uganda's eighth, ninth and tenth parliaments. She was politically affiliated with the Forum for Democratic Change (FDC) and was the party's first Secretary General for ten years.

== Background and education ==
Alaso obtained a Bachelor of Arts in Education from Makerere University.

== Career ==
As a teacher, Alaso taught at Teso College Aloet between 1993 and 1997. During this time, she also taught part-time at Saint Mary's Madera.

After leaving Teso College in 1997, she became a District Gender Officer on the Post-Conflict Recovery Program mainly responsible for Kaberamaido District.

In 2018, Alaso left the Forum for Democratic Change where she had been serving as the Secretary-General. Other sources claim that she was fired from the party and the position.

She is among the founding members of the Alliance for National Transformation (ANT) and as of March 2022, she was listed as the party's Acting National Coordinator.

== Personal life ==
Alaso has been married to Johnson Ebaju since 2007.
