= Beatrice Wabudeya =

Ugandan politician

- Born: 12 December 1956 (age 69); Sironko District Uganda
- Education: Makerere University (Bachelor of Veterinary Medicine) (Master of Veterinary Science)
- Occupations: Veterinarian & Politician
- Years active: 1979 — present
- Known for: Politics

Beatrice Mukaye Wabudeya is a Ugandan veterinarian and politician. She is the former Minister for Kampala Capital City Authority (KCCA), in the Ugandan Cabinet, from 17 March 2011 until 27 May 2011. Prior to that, she served as the Minister for the Presidency, from 2006 until May 2011. In the cabinet reshuffle of 27 May 2011, she was replaced at the Ministry for the Presidency by Kabakumba Masiko. She formerly served as the Member of Parliament (MP), representing Sironko District Women's Constituency from 2001 until 2011.

== Background and education ==
She was born in Sironko District on 12 December 1956. Beatrice Wabudeya graduated with a veterinary degree of Bachelor of Veterinary Medicine (BVM) from Makerere University in 1979. She went on to obtain a Master of Science (MSc) degree, specializing in Agricultural Extension, also from Makerere University in 1996.

== Work experience ==
From 1979 until 1988, Beatrice Wabudeya worked as a Veterinary Officer in Mbale District. From 1988 until 1993, she worked as the Chief District Veterinary Officer for Mbale District. From 1993 until 1996, she served as the Chief Production Officer for Mbale District. In 1996, she entered politics and contested for the Mbale District Women's seat on the National Resistance Movement ticket. She won that seat and served until 2001.

From 1998 until 1999, she served as Minister of State for Gender & Cultural Affairs. In 1999, she served as Minister of State for Health (Primary Health Care), a post she retained until 2001. In 2001, she contested for the seat of Women's Representative for Sironko District. She won that seat, and was re-elected in 2006. She was appointed Minister for the Presidency in 2006 serving in that capacity until she was dropped from the cabinet in May 2011. For a period of two months, from 17 March 2011 until 28 May 2011, she concurrently served as the Minister for Kampala Capital City Authority.

In the past, she served as the elected MP representing the Sironko District Women's Constituency. In March 2011, she ran against Nandala Mafabi of the Forum for Democratic Change (FDC) political party in "Budadiri County West" in Sironko District. Mafabi won handily. In 2014, she was appointed to be the Chairperson of the eight-member Presidential Awards Committee for the next five years.

== Other responsibilities ==
In addition to her responsibilities outlined earlier, she also serves as the chairperson of the board of directors of National Enterprise Corporation, effective 20 March 2014.

== See also ==
- Parliament of Uganda
- Cabinet of Uganda
- Sironko District
