= Agnes Acibu =

Ugandan politician

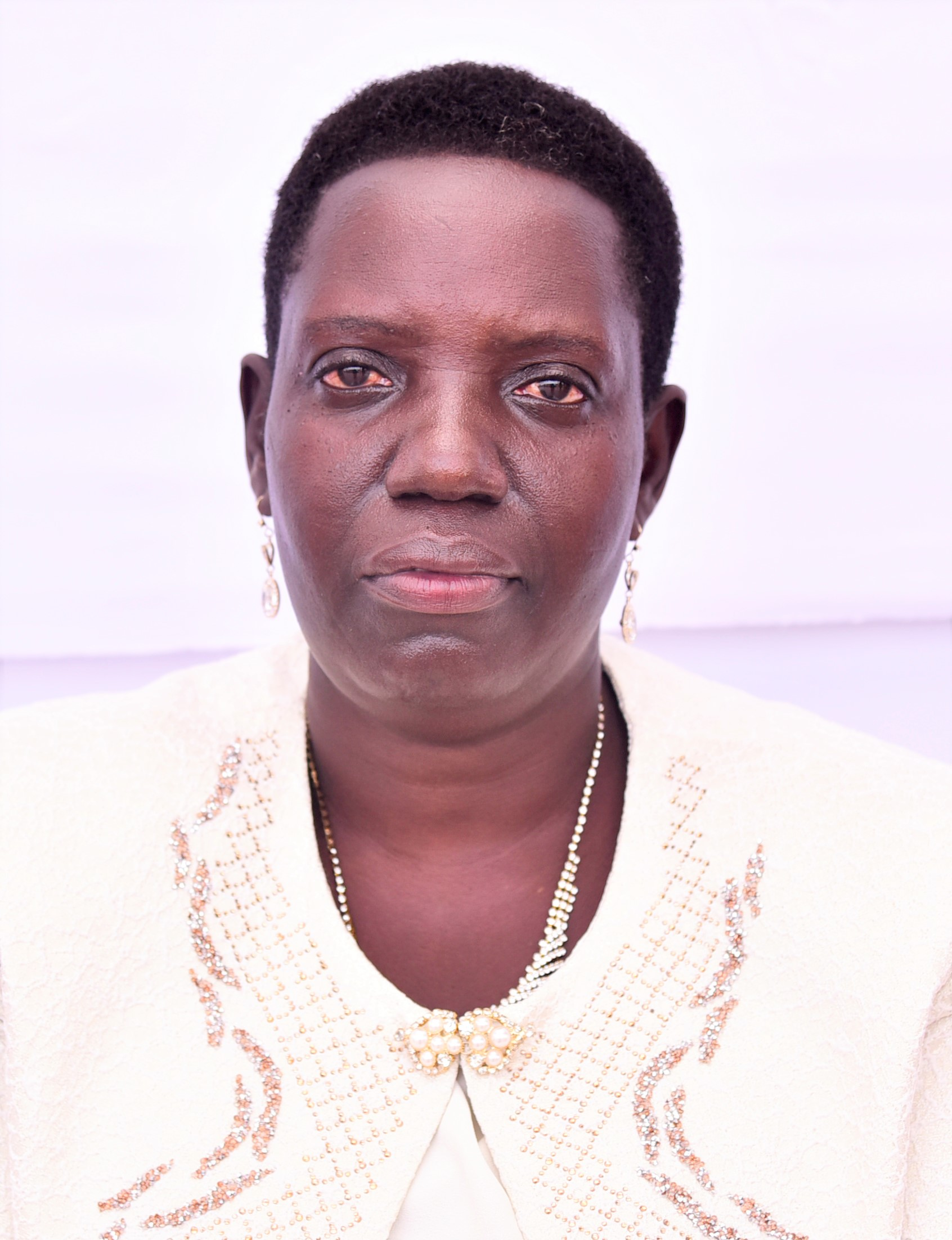
- Citizenship: Ugandan
- Education: Makerere University
- Known for: Politics
- Title: Member of parliament
- Political party: National Resistance Movement
- Children: AFOYOMUNGU JOAN, AYO PIMER PRISCA, RWOTHOMIO MICHAEL JAKER, NYAMUTORO BELIEVE LOISE AND NGOCHOMBE JOHN PAUL.

Agnes Acibu is a Ugandan politician and member of the parliament. She was elected in office as a woman Member to represent Nebbi district during the 2021 Uganda general elections.

She is a member of the ruling National Resistance Movement party.

In the eleventh parliament, she serves on the Committee on HIV/AIDS and Related Matters.

== See also ==
- List of members of the eleventh Parliament of Uganda
- Neebi District
- National Resistance Movement
- Parliament of Uganda.
- Member of Parliament
