= Nabulya Theopista Ssentongo =

Ugandan politician (born 1951)

- Born: 14 February 1951 (age 75)
- Citizenship: Ugandan
- Occupation: Politician
- Known for: Politics
- Political party: National Resistance Movement

Nabulya Theopista Ssentongo (born 14 February 1951) was a Ugandan politician in the eighth and ninth Parliament of Uganda. She was the Workers' Representative for National Resistance Movement Workers District.

== Political career ==
She was elected the direct worker's representative and served in the eighth and ninth Parliament under the NRM political party. She was among the five-member Selected Committee by the former Speaker of Parliament Rebecca Kadaga to probe the allegations of nepotism and unfair recruitment at NSSF, illegal purchase of UMEME shares, irregular disposal of the NSSF assets and any other matter related to the mismanagement of NSSF. The NSSF probing was chaired by former Masaka District LCV chairperson, and Kalungu East MP, Vincent Bamulangaki Ssempijja (independent). He was assisted by Kalungu West MP Joseph Ssewungu (Democratic Party), Ann Maria Nankabirwa (NRM, Kyankwanzi Woman), Alex Ruhunda (NRM, Fort portal Municipality) and Theopista Nabulya Ssentongo (Workers representative for NRM). In 2014, ex-employees of Uganda Telecom Limited tabled their petition to the parliamentary plenary and presented to Nabulya. This was a result of transferring staff benefits to the new companies that instead resorted to massive retrenchment exercises starting in 2002 that saw these workers lose their jobs together with their pension arrears and other damages. She has an odd Grade A in committee performance. She was among the Members of Parliament who visited the Pan African Parliament to understudy its operations in the enforcement of respect of human rights on the continent.

== Controversy ==
In 2003, she reported to Parliament of narrowly surviving rape at her home in Namasuba, near Kampala by Sudanese Refugees. She said that her house help was raped by the same group described as armed and dangerous. She reported the case to the police, however no action has been taken yet four other cases of rape by the same group have been reported although no actions has been done. This report of rape came at the time when MPs were debating the Prime Ministers report on the relocation of Sudanese refugees to West Nile. After the meeting, the first deputy Premier Lt Gen. Moses Ali asked Nabulya to meet him.

== See also ==
- List of members of the eighth Parliament of Uganda
- List of members of the ninth Parliament of Uganda
