= Hashaka Kabahweza Florence =

Ugandan politician

Member of the Uganda Parliament for Kibale County
- In office 2006–2011

Personal details
- Born: Kabale
- Citizenship: Uganda
- Party: National Resistance Movement
- Known for: Politics

Hashaka Kabahweza Florence is a Ugandan politician. She was one of the female representatives in the 8th Parliament of Uganda, representing the Kamwenge District. She affiliated to the political party National Resistance Movement (NRM).

== Biography ==
She held office as a member of the Ugandan Parliament from during the 8th Parliament of Uganda for Kamwenge District, from 2006 to 2011. In the 2011 Uganda general elections, she lost the position to Nshaija Dorothy Kabaraitsya. She attempted to re-enter Parliament in 2020 but received only 4,761 votes against the 25,453 votes received by Sylvia Bahereira, and the 37,938 votes garnered by Dorothy Azeirwe Kabaritsya who garnered 37,938

Despite her performance in the primaries, Hashaka Kabahweza encountered difficulties in the 2020 general elections. She and her team raised allegations of voter bribery during the election process. According to them, the number of votes declared by the NRM District registrar, Asuman Mugisha, did not match the figures on the declaration forms signed by her agents. This discrepancy raised concerns about the election's integrity.

She became a board Member for the Uganda Railways Corporation in 2022.
