= Kabakumba Masiko =

Ugandan politician (born 1966)

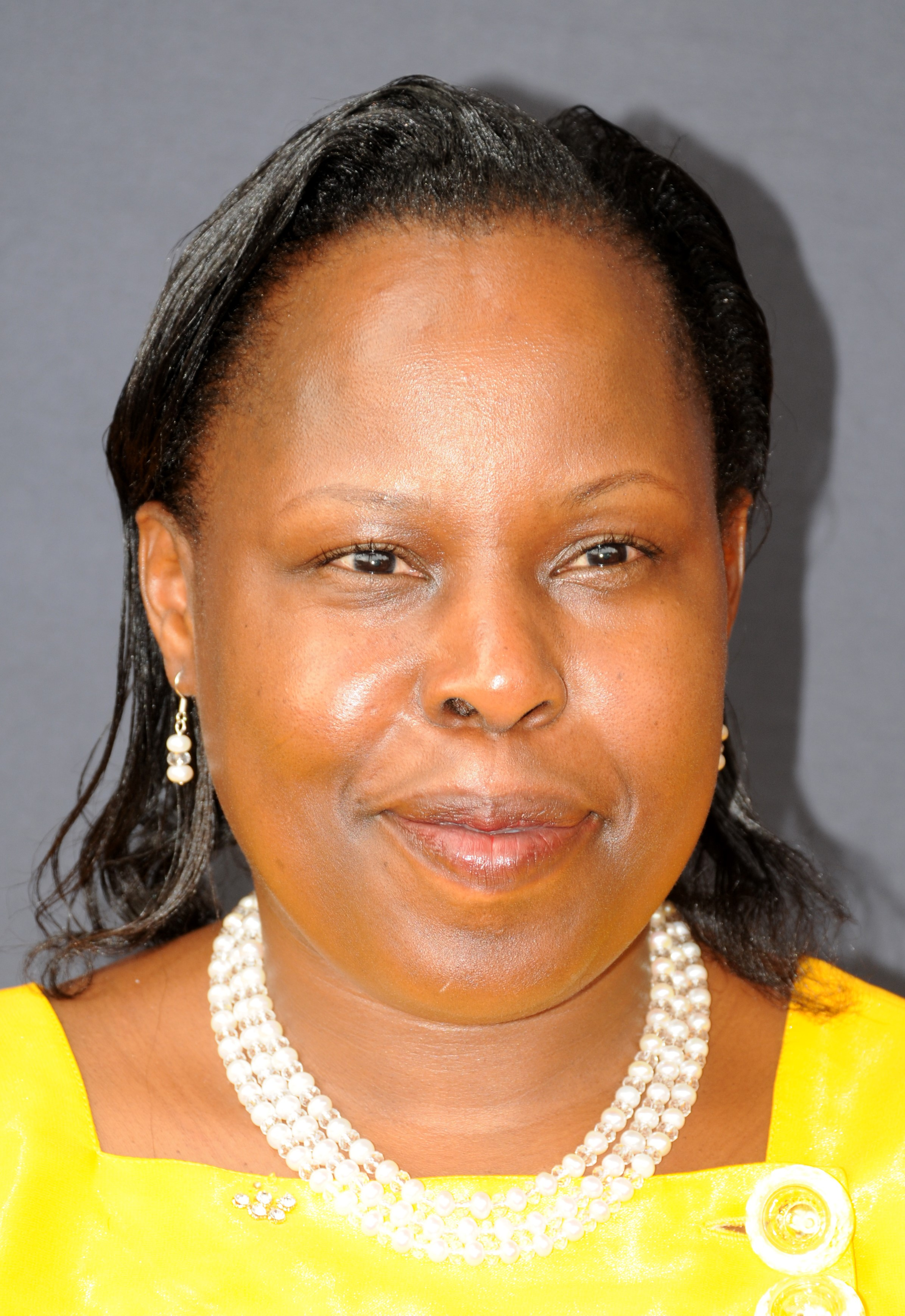
- Born: 20 October 1966 (age 59); Uganda
- Citizenship: Uganda
- Education: Makerere University (BSc in Economics); Uganda Management Institute (Diploma in Public Administration & Management) (MA in Public Administration & Management); Uganda National Chamber of Commerce & Industry (Diploma in Project Planning and Management); International Law Institute (Diploma in Legislative Drafting); Law Development Centre; Diploma in Legal Practice
- Occupation: Politician
- Years active: 1996 – present
- Known for: Politics
- Title: Former Minister of the Presidency & Former Minister for Kampala Capital City Authority
- Spouse: Maj.Gen Henry Masiko

Princess Kabakumba Labwoni Masiko (born 20 October 1966) is a Ugandan politician. She is the former Minister of the Presidency in the Ugandan Cabinet. She was appointed to that position on 27 May 2011. She replaced Beatrice Wabudeya who was dropped from the cabinet. In that capacity, she also served as Minister for Kampala Capital City and Metropolitan Affairs. She resigned from both of those positions on 14 December 2011, following allegations of theft and abuse of office. She also served as the Member of Parliament for Bujenje County in Masindi District until losing the seat in 2016.

== Early life and education ==
Kabakumba was born in Masindi District on 20 October 1966. Kabakumba Masiko studied at Gulu High School for her O-Level and at Nabisunsa Girls' Secondary School for her A-Level education. She entered Makerere University, the oldest and largest public university in the country, graduating in 1990, with degree of Bachelor of Science in Economics. She holds the Diploma in Project Planning & Management from the Uganda National Chamber of Commerce and Industry, obtained in 1998. She also holds the Diploma in Project Planning and Management, obtained in 2000, from Uganda Management Institute (UMI). In 2009, she was awarded the degree of Master of Arts in Public Administration & Management by UMI. Her Diploma in Legislative Drafting was awarded in 2003 by the International Law Institute. In April 2018, Kabakumba graduated with a Diploma in Legal Practice, from the Law Development Centre in Kampala.

== Career ==
From 1986 until 1996, she worked as a party functionary for the ruling National Resistance Movement political party. In 1996, she ran for the parliamentary seat for Masindi District, winning that seat and serving in that position until 2001. In 2001, following redistricting, she ran for the seat of Bujenje County, in Masindi District, winning that seat and serving as area MP until 2006. In 2006, she was re-elected to the Ugandan Parliament. That same year she was appointed Minister for Parliamentary Affairs and Government Chief Whip, a position she served in until her appointment to the information ministry in February 2009. On 16 February 2009, she was appointed Minister of Information and National Guidance, serving in that position until 27 May 2011.

During the 2016 national parliamentary elections, Kabakumba Masiko contested as an independent for the Masindi Municipality seat, but she lost to Ernest Kiiza, the current Minister of State for Bunyoro Affairs. In December 2015, Kabakumba was suspended from the NRM by the Masindi District Executive Committee after choosing to run as an independent for the Masindi Municipality seat following her loss in the party primaries. The district leaders cited a breach of party rules, while Kabakumba dismissed the decision as unfair.

== Personal life ==
Kabakumba Masiko is married to Maj.Gen Henry Masiko, the Joint Staff Political Commissar of Uganda People's Defence Force (UPDF).

== Uganda Broadcasting Corporation Scandal ==
In November 2011, members of the Uganda Police Force, acting on a tip-off, confiscated a radio transmitter and a radio mast from the premises of Kings Broadcasting Sercvice (KBS), in the town of Masindi, in Western Uganda. The equipment allegedly belongs to Uganda Broadcasting Corporation (UBC), the national radio and television network and were stolen from UBC in 2009 or 2010, when Kabakumba was the Minister of Information & National Guidance, responsible for UBC. KBS, which is now off the air, is owned by Kabakumba Masiko (75%) and by the station's general manager (25%). She is also implicated in the irregular sale and lease of land that belongs to UBC, located in Bugoloobi, a suburb of Kampala. The police has presented its findings to the Directorate of Public Prosecution (DPP) for action. When the DPP decided not to press charges against Masiko and instead charged the radio station managers only, fellow members of parliament protested.

== Photos ==
- Photo of Kabakumba Masiko In 2011

== See also ==
- Parliament of Uganda
- Cabinet of Uganda
- Masindi District
