= Sheila Mwine Kabaije =

Ugandan educator and politician

- Born: 26 February 1968 (age 58); Uganda
- Citizenship: Uganda
- Education: Institute of Teacher Education, Kyambogo (Diploma in Secondary Education); Makerere University (Bachelor of Education); University of Reading (Master in Education Organisation, Planning and Management)
- Occupations: Politician, teacher
- Years active: 1991–present
- Known for: Politics, education
- Title: Member of Parliament; Kiruhura District Women's Constituency

Sheila Mwine Kabaije (born 26 February 1968), is a Ugandan teacher and legislator, who serves as the elected woman representative for Kiruhura District in the 10th Parliament of Uganda (2016 to 2021). She is a member of the ruling National Resistance Movement political party.

== Background and education ==
Sheila Mwine attended Buganda Road Primary School, in the city of Kampala, Uganda's capital. In 1982 she was admitted to Gayaza High School, a prestigious all-girls middle and high school in Wakiso District. She studied there for both her O-Level and A-Level education, graduating in 1988 with a High School Diploma.

She attended the then Institute of Teacher Education, Kyambogo, which as of 2021 is a component of Kyambogo University, graduating with a Diploma in Secondary Education in 1990. She continued her education at Makerere University, Uganda's oldest and largest public university, graduating with a Bachelor of Education degree, in 1996. Her degree of Master of Education Organisation, Planning and Management, was awarded by the University of Reading, in 2005.

== Career as teacher ==
Sheila Mwine started out as a teacher at Kinoni Girls School, in Mbarara City between 1991 and 1994. She was later transferred to Bishop Kivengere Girls School, Muyebe as a deputy headteacher between 1997 and 2001 after which she served as head teacher of the same school between 2001 and 2007. Subsequently, she served as the District Education Officer for Kiruhura District Local Government, from 2007 to 2015.

== Career as politician ==
She successfully contested for the Women's Constituency seat of Kiruhura District, during the 2016 election season. In Uganda's 10th parliament, she is a member of the committee on Education and Sports as well as that of Commissions, State Authorities and State Enterprises.
