= Stephen Chebrot =

Ugandan physician and politician

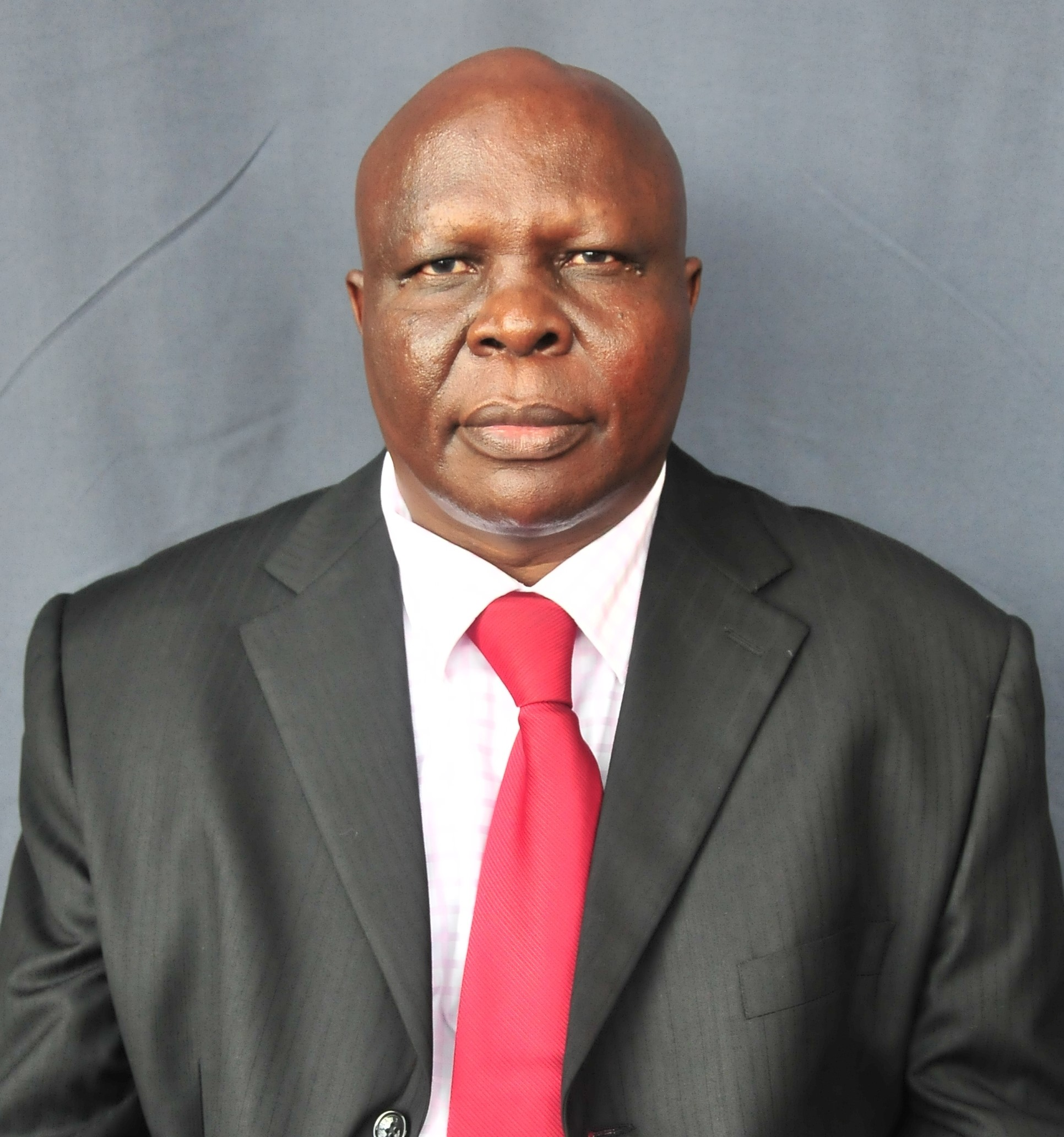
- Born: 27 July 1951 (age 75); Uganda
- Citizenship: Uganda
- Education: University of Nairobi (Bachelor of Medicine and Bachelor of Surgery) (MMed in Obstetrics & Gynecology); Harvard T.H. Chan School of Public Health (Master of Public Health); Johns Hopkins School of Public Health (MSc. in Biostatistics & Epidemiology); McGill University (MSc. in Leadership & Management)
- Occupations: Physician & Politician
- Years active: 1979 — present
- Known for: Politics
- Title: State Minister of Transport
- Spouse: Mrs. Chebrot

Stephen Chemoiko Chebrot (born 27 July 1951) is a Ugandan physician and politician. He is the current State Minister for Transport in the Ugandan Cabinet. He was appointed to that position on 27 May 2011. He replaced Simon Ejua, who was dropped from the Cabinet. In the cabinet reshuffle of 1 March 2015, he retained his cabinet portfolio. Stephen Chebrot also serves as the elected Member of Parliament for "Tingey County", in Kapchorwa District.

== Background and education ==
He was born in Kapchorwa District on 27 July 1951. He holds the degrees of Bachelor of Medicine and Bachelor of Surgery, obtained in 1979, and that of Master of Medicine in Obstetrics and Gynecology, obtained in 1986, from the University of Nairobi. In 1998, he obtained the degree of Master of Public Health, from Harvard School of Public Health. He followed that up with the degree of Master of Science in Biostatistics and Epidemiology, obtained in 2002 from the Johns Hopkins School of Public Health. In 2009, McGill University awarded him the degree of Master of Science in Leadership and Management.

== Career ==
Following his graduation from the University of Nairobi School of Medicine, he spent one year at Kenyatta National Hospital, working as an Intern. From 1980 to 1982, he worked as a medical officer for the Kenya Ministry of Health. In 1982, he entered the Master of Medicine program at Kenyatta, operated both by the hospital and the University of Nairobi, graduating in 1985, with the degree of MMed in Obstetrics and Gynecology. From 1985 until 1986, he worked as a Consultant Obstetrician and Gynecologist, based at "Filsi Hospital" in Kenya.

He returned to Uganda in 1986 and was named Ambassador to India, serving in that capacity until 1988. In 1988, he was elected to parliament to represent "Tingey County", Kapchorwa District. He won and has been re-elected since. From 1988 until 1994, he served as the State Minister for Local Government and was the Minister of Labor from 1994 until 1997.

== Other considerations ==
Stephen Chebrot is married. He subscribes to the Protestant faith. He belongs to the National Resistance Movement political party.

== See also ==
- Cabinet of Uganda
- Parliament of Uganda
- Government of Uganda
