= Lukwago Rebecca Nalwanga =

Ugandan politician

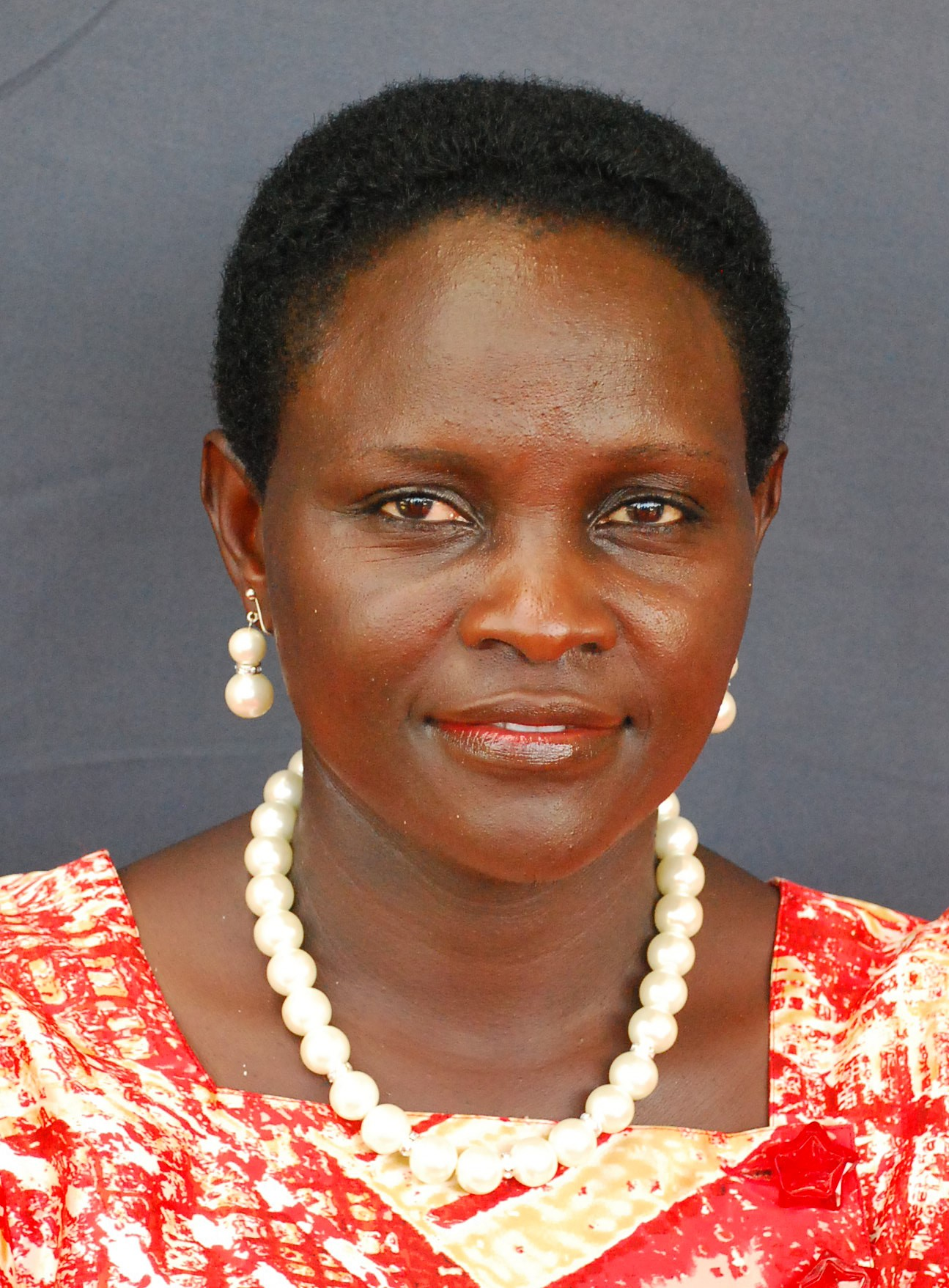
- Lukwago Rebecca Nalwanga
- Political party: National Resistance Movement

Lukwago Rebecca Nalwanga is a Ugandan politician. She was the former female Member of Parliament in the eighth Parliament of Uganda representing Luweero District under the National Resistance Movement (NRM) political party.

== Political life ==
The former Luweero district Member of the Parliament asked for a cash bailout from the President Museveni to assist her in settling legal fees piled up from a host of court petitions she filed. She was as a result of her 2011 election getting challenged to the Parliament by her political rivals.

Rebecca requested that every one who aids in crime to be charged and brought to book. She added and emphasized the need to restore the public's trust in courts before they resort to mob justice. In 2014, she was reported to have been one of the five contestants from the NRM including Elizabeth Lugudde, Ramlah Kadala, Lilian Nakate, Jimiya Ssenkanja and Rita Mugalu who declared their interest in the MP seat.

== See also ==
- List of members of the eighth Parliament of Uganda
