= Simon Ejua =

Ugandan politician

- Born: 3 August 1968 (age 58); Uganda
- Citizenship: Uganda
- Education: Uganda College of Commerce (Diploma in Business Studies); Makerere University (Bachelor of Commerce); Uganda Martyrs University (Diploma in Financial Management); Fintech Business Technology Solutions (Certificate in Information Technology)
- Occupation: Politician
- Years active: 1994–present
- Known for: Politics
- Spouse: Mrs. Ejua

Simon Ejua is a Ugandan politician. He was the state minister for transport in the Ugandan Cabinet from 1 June 2006 until 27 May 2011. He survived the cabinet reshuffle of 16 February 2009. In the cabinet reshuffle of 27 May 2011, he was dropped from the cabinet and was replaced by Stephen Chebrot He also served as the elected Member of Parliament, representing Vurra County, Arua District, from 2006 until 2011. In the 2011 national elections, he lost his parliamentary seat to Sam Agatre Okuonzi, an independent politician, who is the incumbent MP for that constituency.

== Background and education ==
He was born in Arua District on 3 August 1968. He holds a Uganda Diploma in Business Studies, obtained in 1993 from the Uganda College of Commerce, which became the Makerere University Business School in 1997. In 2000, he obtained a Bachelor of Commerce in accounting from Makerere University. He went on to obtain a postgraduate Diploma in Financial Management from Uganda Martyrs University, in 2003. He also holds a postgraduate Certificate in Information Technology, obtained in 2003 from Fintech Business Technology Solutions.

== Work experience ==
In 1994, Simon Ejua worked as a market inspector in Arua District. In 1995, he worked for five months as the assistant bursar at St. Charles Lwanga Secondary School in Koboko, Koboko District. Later in 1995, he was appointed an auditor in the Office of the Auditor General of Uganda, working in that capacity until 2005. He entered politics in 2006, contesting for the parliamentary seat of Vurra County, Arua District. He was elected on the National Resistance Movement political party ticket. He was appointed to his present cabinet post in 2006. He lost both his parliamentary seat and his cabinet post on 18 March 2011 and 27 May 2011, respectively.

== See also ==
- Vurra
