= List of members of the eleventh Parliament of Uganda =

Eleventh Parliament of Uganda
←	10th Parliament	12th Parliament	→

Overview
- Legislative body: Parliament of Uganda
- Jurisdiction: Uganda
- Meeting place: Parliament Avenue, Kampala
- Term: 24 May 2021 – present
- Election: 2021 Ugandan general election
- Government: Yoweri Museveni Government
- Website: www.parliament.go.ug

Parliament of Uganda
- Members: 426
- Speaker: Jacob Oulanyah (until 20 March 2022); Anita Among (from 25 March 2022)
- Deputy Speaker: Thomas Tayebwa (from 25 March 2022)
- Leader of the Opposition: Mathias Mpuuga (until 9 January 2024); Joel Ssenyonyi (from 9 January 2024)
- Party control: National Resistance Movement

This is a list of members elected to the eleventh Parliament of Uganda (2021 to 2026) in the 2021 Ugandan general election. It was preceded by the tenth Parliament (2016 to 2021).

== List of members ==
Name	Party	Constituency	District
Jimbricky Norman Ochero	NRM	Labwor	Abim District
Janet Grace Akech Okorimoe	NRM	Women's Representative	Abim District
James Mamawi	NRM	Adjumani East	Adjumani District
Moses Ali	NRM	Adjumani West	Adjumani District
Jesca Ababiku	NRM	Women's Representative	Adjumani District
Lagen David Atuka	NRM	Agago	Agago District
John Amos Okot	NRM	Agago North	Agago District
Ricky Richard Anywar	NRM	Agago West	Agago District
Beatrice Akor Akello	NRM	Women's Representative	Agago District
Denis Hamson Obua	NRM	Ajuri	Alebtong District
Samuel Okwir	NRM	Moroto	Alebtong District
Dorcus Acen	NRM	Women's Representative	Alebtong District
Okot, Moses Junior	FDC	Kioga	Amolatar District
James Dubai Olobo	NRM	Kioga North	Amolatar District
Agnes Apea Atim	NRM	Women's Representative	Amolatar District
Micah Akasile Lolem	NRM	Upe	Amudat District
Betty Luoke Chelain	NRM	Women's Representative	Amudat District
Musa Francis Ecweru	NRM	Amuria	Amuria District
Abubakar Jeje Odongo	NRM	Orungo	Amuria District
Susan Amero	INDEP	Women's Representative	Amuria District
Anthony Akol	FDC	Kilak North	Amuru District
Gilbert Olanya	FDC	Kilak South	Amuru District
Lucy Akello	FDC	Women's Representative	Amuru District
Patrick Ocan	UPC	Apac Municipality	Apac District
Maxwell Akora	UPC	Maruzi	Apac District
Nelson Okello	UPC	Maruzi North	Apac District
Susan Achola Engola	UPC	Women's Representative	Apac District
Jackson Atiima	NRM	Arua Central	Arua City
Geoffrey Feta	NRM	Ayiivu East	Arua City
John Lematia	NRM	Ayiivu West	Arua City
Mourine Osoru	NRM	City Woman MP	Arua City
Yovan Adriko	NRM	Vurra	Arua District
Lillian Obiale Paparu	NRM	Women's Representative	Arua District
Arthur Waako Mboizi	INDEP	Budaka	Budaka District
Robert Kasolo	NRM	Iki-Iki	Budaka District
Pamela Nasiyo Kamugo	NRM	Women's Representative	Budaka District
David Wakikona	NRM	Bukyigai	Bududa District
Isaac Modoi	NRM	Lutsheshe	Bududa District
John Baptist Nambeshe	NUP	Manjiya	Bududa District
Agnes Nandutu	INDEP	Women's Representative	Bududa District
Asuman Basalirwa	JFP	Bugiri Municipality	Bugiri District
Solomon Silwany	NRM	Bukhooli Central	Bugiri District
Stephen Mugabi Baka	NRM	Bukhooli North	Bugiri District
Agnes Taaka	NRM	Women's Representative	Bugiri District
Abdu Katuntu	INDEP	Bugweri	Bugweri District
Rachael Magoola	NRM	Women's Representative	Bugweri District
Francis Mwijukye	FDC	Buhweju	Buhweju District
Ephraim Biraaro	NRM	Buhweju West	Buhweju District
Olive Katwesigye Koyekyenga	NRM	Women's Representative	Buhweju District
Michael Philip Lulume Bayigga	DP	Buikwe South	Buikwe District
Stephen Sserubula	NUP	Lugazi Municipality	Buikwe District
Jimmy Lwanga	NUP	Njeru Municipality	Buikwe District
Resty Nanteza	FDC	Women's Representative	Buikwe District
John Bosco Ikojo	NRM	Bukedea	Bukedea District
Patrick Isiagi Opolot	NRM	Kachumbala	Bukedea District
Anita Annet Among	NRM	Women's Representative	Bukedea District
Nandagire Christine Ndiwalana	NUP	Bukomansimbi North	Bukomansimbi District
Godfrey Ssolo Kayemba	NUP	Bukomansimbi South	Bukomansimbi District
Veronica Namaganda Nanyondo	NUP	Women's Representative	Bukomansimbi District
Paul Reuben Chelimo	NRM	Kongasis	Bukwo District
Solomon Chelangat Alinga	NRM	Too	Bukwo District
Evelyn Chemutai	INDEP	Women's Representative	Bukwo District
Isaac Katenya	INDEP	Bulambuli	Bulambuli District
Ignatius Inyasio Wamakuyu Mudimi	NRM	Elgon	Bulambuli District
Gerald Nangoli	NRM	Elgon North	Bulambuli District
Irene Muloni	NRM	Women's Representative	Bulambuli District
Allan Atugonza	INDEP	Buliisa	Buliisa District
Norah Bigirwa-Nyendwoha	NRM	Women's Representative	Buliisa District
Acrobat Kiiza Moses	INDEP	Bughendera	Bundibugyo District
Richard Gafabusa	NRM	Bwamba	Bundibugyo District
Babungi Josephine Bebona	NRM	Women's Representative	Bundibugyo District
Davis Kamukama	NRM	Bunyangabu	Bunyangabu District
Peace Regis Mutuuzo	NRM	Women's Representative	Bunyangabu District
Kabuura Derrick Baimukye	NRM	Bushenyi-Ishaka Municipality	Bushenyi District
Michael Mawanda	NRM	Igara East	Bushenyi District
Mbwatekamwa Gaffa	NRM	Igara West	Bushenyi District
Annet Katusiime Mugisha	NRM	Women's Representative	Bushenyi District
Geoffrey Macho	INDEP	Busia Municipality	Busia District
Denis Nyangweso	INDEP	Samia Bugwe Central	Busia District
John Mulimba	NRM	Samia Bugwe North	Busia District
Godfrey Odero Were	INDEP	Samia Bugwe South	Busia District
Hellen Auma Wandera	NRM	Women's Representative	Busia District
Yusuf Mutembuli	NRM	Bunyole East	Butaleja District
Geoffrey Mutiwa	NRM	Bunyole West	Butaleja District
Florence Andiru Nebanda	NRM	Women's Representative	Butaleja District
Muwanga Kivumbi	NUP	Butambala	Butambala District
Asha Aisha Kabanda Nalule	NUP	Women's Representative	Butambala District
Patrick Lodoi Mutono	NRM	Butebo	Butebo District
Agnes Ameede	INDEP	Women's Representative	Butebo District
Robert Ndugwa Migadde	NRM	Buvuma	Buvuma District
Susan Mugabi Nakaziba	NUP	Women's Representative	Buvuma District
Moses Magogo	NRM	Budiope East	Buyende District
John Bosco Mubito	INDEP	Budiope West	Buyende District
Mary Annet Nakato	INDEP	Women's Representative	Buyende District
Moses Goli Ogwal	NRM	Dokolo North	Dokolo District
Felix Okot Ogong	NRM	Dokolo South	Dokolo District
Cecilia Barbra Atim Ogwal	FDC	Women's Representative	Dokolo District
Alex Ruhunda	NRM	Central Division	Fort Portal City
Irene Linda Mugisha	NRM	City Woman MP	Fort Portal City
Margaret Annet Muhanga Mugisa	NRM	North Division	Fort Portal City
Godfrey Ssazi	NUP	Gomba East	Gomba District
Robina Gureme Rwakoojo	NRM	Gomba West	Gomba District
Sylvia Nayebale	NRM	Women's Representative	Gomba District
Betty Aol Ochan	FDC	City Woman MP	Gulu City
Charles Onen	INDEP	Gulu East	Gulu City
Mapenduzi Martin Ojara	INDEP	Gulu West	Gulu City
Ronald Reagan Okumu	FDC	Aswa	Gulu District
Sharon Balmoi Laker	NRM	Women's Representative	Gulu District
Asinansi Nyakato	FDC	City Woman MP	Hoima City
Patrick Mwesigwa Isingoma	INDEP	Hoima East Division	Hoima City
Joseph Ruyonga	NRM	Hoima West Division	Hoima City
Pius Wakabi	NRM	Bugahya	Hoima District
David Karubanga	NRM	Kigorobya	Hoima District
Harriet Businge	NRM	Women's Representative	Hoima District
Bishanga Tarsis Rwaburindore	NRM	Ibanda Municipality	Ibanda District
Xavier Kyooma	NRM	Ibanda North	Ibanda District
Paul Ninkusiima	NRM	Ibanda South	Ibanda District
Jane Kabajungu Bainomugisha	NRM	Women's Representative	Ibanda District
Peter Mugema	INDEP	Iganga Municipality	Iganga District
Fredrick Kyakulaga Bwino	NRM	Kigulu North	Iganga District
Milton Kalulu Muwuma	NRM	Kigulu South	Iganga District
Sauda Kauma	NRM	Women's Representative	Iganga District
Stephen Rwakanuuma Kangwagye	INDEP	Bukanga	Isingiro District
Nathan Byanyima	NRM	Bukanga North	Isingiro District
Bright Kanyontore Rwamirama	NRM	Isingiro North	Isingiro District
Alex Bakunda Byarugaba	NRM	Isingiro South	Isingiro District
Anthony Tumwesigye	NRM	Isingiro West	Isingiro District
Clare Mugumya	NRM	Women's Representative	Isingiro District
Manjeri Kyebakutika	NUP	City Woman MP	Jinja City
David Aga Isabirye	FDC	Jinja North Division	Jinja City
Nathan Igeme Nabeta	NRM	Jinja South East Division	Jinja City
Timothy Batuwa Lusala	FDC	Jinja South West Division	Jinja City
James Michael Jimmy Obote Akena	UPC	Lira City East	Jinja City
Vincent Shedrick Eyit Obong		Lira City West	Jinja City
David Livingstone Zijjan	INDEP	Butembe	Jinja District
Alex Brandon Kintu	NRM	Kagoma North	Jinja District
Muwanika Walyomu Moses	INDEP	Kagoma South	Jinja District
Tibyaze Peace	INDEP	Women's Representative	Jinja District
Emmanuel Komol	INDEP	Dodoth East	Kaabong District
Joseph Miid Achuka Komol	NRM	Dodoth North	Kaabong District
Hillary Lokwang	NRM	Ik	Kaabong District
Christine Tubo Nakwang	NRM	Women's Representative	Kaabong District
Nicholas Kamara	FDC	Kabale Municipality	Kabale District
Wilfred Niwagaba	INDEP	Ndorwa East	Kabale District
David Bahati	NRM	Ndorwa West	Kabale District
Ndamira Catherine Atwakire	NRM	Women's Representative	Kabale District
Stephen Kagwera Kasaija	NRM	Burahya	Kabarole District
Victoria Rusoke Businge	NRM	Women's Representative	Kabarole District
Alfred Elau Edakasi	NRM	Kaberamaido	Kaberamaido District
Julius Peter Emigu	FDC	Ochero	Kaberamaido District
Jane Awich	NRM	Women's Representative	Kaberamaido District
Eric Acali Musana	INDEP	Buyaga East	Kagadi District
Barnabas Tinkasimire	NRM	Buyaga West	Kagadi District
Janepher Mbabazi Kyomuhendo	NRM	Women's Representative	Kagadi District
Aisa Black Agaba	NRM	Bugangaizi East	Kakumiro District
Josephat Tumwesigye	NRM	Bugangaizi South	Kakumiro District
Fred Byamukama	NRM	Bugangaizi West	Kakumiro District
Robinah Nabbanja (Prime Minister)	NRM	Women's Representative	Kakumiro District
Clement Peter Ongalo	NRM	Kalaki	Kalaki District
Jennifer Ayoo	NRM	Women's Representative	Kalaki District
Fred Badda	NRM	Bujumba	Kalangala District
Mose Kabuusu	FDC	Kyamuswa	Kalangala District
Helen Nakimuli	NUP	Women's Representative	Kalangala District
Dan Namwanza Badebye	INDEP	Bulamogi	Kaliro District
Fredrick Ngobi Gume	NRM	Bulamogi North West	Kaliro District
Brenda Namukuta	NRM	Women's Representative	Kaliro District
Francis Katongole Katabaazi	NUP	Kalungu East	Kalungu District
Joseph Gonzaga Ssewungu	NUP	Kalungu West	Kalungu District
Aisha Ssekindi	NRM	Women's Representative	Kalungu District
Muhammed Nsereko	INDEP	Kampala Central Division	Kampala District
Muhammad Ssegirinya	NUP	Kawempe North	Kampala District
Bashir Kazibwe	NUP	Kawempe South	Kampala District
Abubakar Kawalya	NUP	Lubaga North	Kampala District
Aloysius Mukasa	NUP	Lubaga South	Kampala District
Derrick Nyeko	NUP	Makindye East	Kampala District
Alan Ssewanyana	NUP	Makindye West	Kampala District
Ronald Nsubuga Balimwezo	NUP	Nakawa East	Kampala District
Joel Ssenyonyi (Leader of the Opposition)	NUP	Nakawa West	Kampala District
Shamim Malende	NUP	Women's Representative	Kampala District
George Mulindwa	INDEP	Bugabula North	Kamuli District
Henry Maurice Kibalya	NRM	Bugabula South	Kamuli District
Muzaale Martin Kisule Mugabi	NRM	Buzaaya	Kamuli District
Kayanga Baroda Watongola		Kamuli Municipality	Kamuli District
Rebecca Kadaga	NRM	Women's Representative	Kamuli District
Abigaba Cuthbert Mirembe	NRM	Kibale	Kamwenge District
Frank Tumwebaze	NRM	Kibale East	Kamwenge District
Sylvia Bahereira	INDEP	Women's Representative	Kamwenge District
James Niringyimana Kaberuka	NRM	Kinkinzi West	Kanungu District
Chris Baryomunsi	NRM	Kinkizi East	Kanungu District
Patience Nkunda Kinshaba	NRM	Women's Representative	Kanungu District
Sam Mangusho Cheptoris	NRM	Kapchorwa Municipality	Kapchorwa District
Fadil Twalla	NRM	Tingei	Kapchorwa District
Phyllis Chemutai	NRM	Women's Representative	Kapchorwa District
Anthony Esenu	NRM	Kapelebyong	Kapelebyong District
Jacinta Atuto	NRM	Women's Representative	Kapelebyong District
Ben Batom Koryang	NRM	Dodoth West	Karenga District
Phillips Lokwang	NRM	Napore West	Karenga District
Rose Lilly Akello	NRM	Women's Representative	Karenga District
Harold Tonny Muhindo	FDC	Bukonzo East	Kasese District
Godfrey Katusabe	FDC	Bukonzo West	Kasese District
Sowedi Kitanywa	NRM	Busongora North	Kasese District
Gideon Mujungu Thembo	NRM	Busongora South	Kasese District
Kambale Ferigo	NRM	Kasese Municipality	Kasese District
Florence Kabugho	FDC	Women's Representative	Kasese District
Michael Kyabikola Bukenya	NRM	Bukuya	Kassanda District
Frank Kabuye	NUP	Kassanda North	Kassanda District
Patrick Nsamba Oshabe	NUP	Kassanda South	Kassanda District
Flavia Nabagabe Kalule	NUP	Women's Representative	Kassanda District
Peter Ogwang	NRM	Ngariam	Katakwi District
Joseph Andrew Koluo	INDEP	Toroma	Katakwi District
Bosco Okiror	NRM	Usuk	Katakwi District
Jessica Rose Epel Alupo	INDEP	Women's Representative	Katakwi District
Charles Tebandeke	NUP	Bbaale	Kayunga District
Amos Lugoloobi	NRM	Ntenjeru North	Kayunga District
Patrick Kayongo Nsanja	INDEP	Ntenjeru South	Kayunga District
Aidah Nantaba		Women's Representative	Kayunga District
Dan Kimosho Atwijukire	NRM	Kazo	Kazo District
Jenifer Abaho Muheesi	NRM	Women's Representative	Kazo District
Matia Kasaija	NRM	Buyanja	Kibaale District
Emily Kugonza	NRM	Buyanja East	Kibaale District
Noeline Kisembo Basemera	NRM	Women's Representative	Kibaale District
Kiwanuka Keefa	NRM	Kiboga East	Kiboga District
Abdul Mutumba	NRM	Kiboga West	Kiboga District
Christine Nakimwero Kaaya	NUP	Women's Representative	Kiboga District
Mauku Stephen Mugole	NRM	Kabweri	Kibuku District
Herbert Tom Kinobere	NRM	Kibuku	Kibuku District
Jenipher Namuyangu	NRM	Women's Representative	Kibuku District
Francis Twinomujuni	NRM	Buhaguzi	Kikuube District
Stephen Aseera	INDEP	Buhaguzi East	Kikuube District
Flora Natumanya	NRM	Women's Representative	Kikuube District
Tayebwa Herbert	NRM	Kashongi	Kiruhura District
Wilson Kajwengye	NRM	Nyabushozi	Kiruhura District
Jovanice Twinobusingye	NRM	Women's Representative	Kiruhura District
Linos Ngompek	NRM	Kibanda North	Kiryandongo District
Karubanga Jacob	NRM	Kibanda South	Kiryandongo District
Hellen Kahunde	NRM	Women's Representative	Kiryandongo District
James Nsaba Buturo	NRM	Bufumbira East	Kisoro District
John Nizeyimana Kamara	NRM	Bufumbira North	Kisoro District
Alex Niyonsaba Seruganda	NRM	Bufumbira South	Kisoro District
Eddie Wagahungu Kwizera	NRM	Bukimbiri	Kisoro District
Paul Buchana Kwizera	NRM	Kisoro Municipality	Kisoro District
Sarah Mateke Nyirabashitsi	NRM	Women's Representative	Kisoro District
Nulu Joseph Byamukama	NRM	Kitagwenda	Kitagwenda District
Dorothy Nyakato	NRM	Women's Representative	Kitagwenda District
Margaret Lamwaka Odwar		Chua East	Kitgum District
Okin P. P. Ojara	FDC	Chua West	Kitgum District
Denis Amere Onekalit	FDC	Kitgum Municipality	Kitgum District
Lillian Aber	NRM	Women's Representative	Kitgum District
James Boliba Baba	NRM	Koboko	Koboko District
Charles Ayume	NRM	Koboko Municipality	Koboko District
Musa Noah	INDEP	Koboko North	Koboko District
Taban Sharifah Aate	NRM	Women's Representative	Koboko District
Samuel Acuti Opio	INDEP	Kole North	Kole District
Peter Ocen	INDEP	Kole South	Kole District
Judith Alyek	NRM	Women's Representative	Kole District
Peter Abrahams Lokii	NRM	Jie	Kotido District
Muhammad Lomwar Ismail	NRM	Kotido Municipality	Kotido District
Margaret Achilla Aleper	NRM	Women's Representative	Kotido District
Simon Peter Opolot	NRM	Kanyum	Kumi District
Sidronius Opolot	NRM	Kumi	Kumi District
Silas Aogon	INDEP	Kumi Municipality	Kumi District
Christine Apolot	NRM	Women's Representative	Kumi District
Tonny Ayoo	NRM	Kwania	Kwania District
Bob Okae	UPC	Kwania North	Kwania District
Kenny Auma	UPC	Women's Representative	Kwania District
William Chemonges	NRM	Kween	Kween District
Chemaswet Kisos	NRM	Soi	Kween District
Rose Emma Cherukut	NRM	Women's Representative	Kween District
Patrick Nyanzi Bingi	NRM	Butemba	Kyankwanzi District
Yoweri Sebikali	NRM	Ntwetwe	Kyankwanzi District
Christine Bukenya Ssendawula	NRM	Women's Representative	Kyankwanzi District
Tom Bright	NRM	Kyaka Central	Kyegegwa District
Paul Asaba	NRM	Kyaka North	Kyegegwa District
Jackson Kafuuzi	NRM	Kyaka South	Kyegegwa District
Flavia Rwabuhoro Kabahenda	NRM	Women's Representative	Kyegegwa District
Tom Butime	NRM	Mwenge Central	Kyenjojo District
Muhumuza David		Mwenge North	Kyenjojo District
Donald Katalihwa	NRM	Mwenge South	Kyenjojo District
Faith Kunihira Philo	NRM	Women's Representative	Kyenjojo District
Christopher Kalemba	NRM	Kakuuto	Kyotera District
John Paul Mpalanyi Lukwago	DP	Kyotera	Kyotera District
Fortunate Nantongo	DP	Women's Representative	Kyotera District
Akullo Aabuka	NRM	Lamwo	Lamwo District
Hilary Onek	NRM	Palabek	Lamwo District
Nancy Acora	INDEP	Women's Representative	Lamwo District
Jane Ruth Ocero Aceng	NRM	City Woman MP	Lira City
Christine Akello	NRM	Erute North	Lira District
Jonathan Odur	UPC	Erute South	Lira District
Linda Agnes Auma	INDEP	Women's Representative	Lira District
Luke Kyobe	NRM	Luuka North	Luuka District
Stephen Kisa	NRM	Luuka South	Luuka District
Esther Mbulakubuza Mbayo	NRM	Women's Representative	Luuka District
Robert Ssekitoleko	NUP	Bamunanika	Luwero District
Denis Sekabira	NUP	Katikamu North	Luwero District
Hassan Kirumira	NUP	Katikamu South	Luwero District
Brenda Nabukenya	NUP	Women's Representative	Luwero District
Isaac Ssejjoba	NRM	Bukoto Mid-West	Lwengo District
Twaha Kagabo	NUP	Bukoto South	Lwengo District
Muhammed Sentayi	NRM	Bukoto West	Lwengo District
Cissy Dionizia Namujju	NRM	Women's Representative	Lwengo District
K. Enos Asiimwe	NRM	Kabula	Lyantonde District
Pauline Kyaka Kemirembe	NRM	Women's Representative	Lyantonde District
Ronald Olema Afidra	NRM	Lower Madi	Madi-Okollo District
Isaac Joackino Etuka	NRM	Upper Madi	Madi-Okollo District
Joanne Aniku Okia	NRM	Women's Representative	Madi-Okollo District
Peter Christopher Werikhe	NRM	Bubulo West	Manafwa District
Wakooli Godfrey Matembu	NRM	Butiru	Manafwa District
Mary Goretti Kitutu	NRM	Women's Representative	Manafwa District
Denis Lee Oguzu	FDC	Maracha	Maracha District
Ruth Molly Lematia	NRM	Maracha East	Maracha District
Jennifer Driwaru	NRM	Women's Representative	Maracha District
Abed Bwanika	NUP	Kimanya-Kabonera	Masaka City
Mathias Mpuuga	NUP	Nyendo/Mukungwe	Masaka City
Juliet Kakande Nakabuye	NUP	Women's Representative	Masaka City
Richard Sebamala	DP	Bukoto Central	Masaka District
Ronald Evans Kanyike	NUP	Bukoto East	Masaka District
Joan Namutaawe	INDEP	Women's Representative	Masaka District
Kiiza Kenneth Nyendwoha	INDEP	Bujenje	Masindi District
Bintu Jalia Lukumu N. Abwooli	NRM	Buruli	Masindi District
Joab Businge	FDC	Masindi Municipality	Masindi District
Florence Akiiki Asiimwe	NRM	Women's Representative	Masindi District
James Kubeketerya	NRM	Bunya East	Mayuge District
Iddi Isabirye	NRM	Bunya South	Mayuge District
Aggrey Henry Bagiire	NRM	Bunya West	Mayuge District
Rukia Isanga Nakadama	NRM	Women's Representative	Mayuge District
Karim Masaba		Industrial City Division	Mbale City
Ivan Masaba	NUP	Northern Division	Mbale City
Connie Galiwango Nakayenze	INDEP	Women's Representative	Mbale City
Richard Wanda	NRM	Bungokho Central	Mbale District
Shafiga Wanyenya	INDEP	Bungokho North	Mbale District
Robert Wandwasi	NRM	Bungokho South	Mbale District
Miriam Mukhaye		Women's Representative	Mbale District
Robert Mwesigwa	NRM	Mbarara City North	Mbarara City
Mwine Mpaka Rwamirama	NRM	Mbarara City South	Mbarara City
Rita Atukwasa	INDEP	Women's Representative	Mbarara City
Basil Rwankwene Bataringaya	NRM	Kashari North	Mbarara District
Nathan Itungo Twesigye	INDEP	Kashari South	Mbarara District
Margaret Rwebyambu	NRM	Women's Representative	Mbarara District
Kahinda Otafiire	NRM	Ruhinda	Mitooma District
Thomas Tayebwa	NRM	Ruhinda North	Mitooma District
Donozio Mugabe Kahonda	NRM	Ruhinda South	Mitooma District
Juliet Bashiisha Agasha	NRM	Women's Representative	Mitooma District
David Kalwanga Lukyamuzi	NUP	Busujju	Mityana District
Francis Zaake	NUP	Mityana Municipality	Mityana District
Kaleide Sematiko	NUP	Mityana North	Mityana District
Richard Lumu	DP	Mityana South	Mityana District
Joyce Ntwatwa Bagala	NUP	Women's Representative	Mityana District
John Baptist Lokii	NRM	Matheniko	Moroto District
Francis Lorika Adome	NRM	Moroto Municipality	Moroto District
Albert Lokoru Kiyonga	NRM	Tepeth	Moroto District
Stella Atyang	NRM	Women's Representative	Moroto District
Tom Aleru Aza	NRM	Moyo West	Moyo District
Joyce Kabutu Moriku	NRM	Women's Representative	Moyo District
Hillary Kiyaga	NUP	Mawokota North	Mpigi District
Yusuf Nsibambi	FDC	Mawokota South	Mpigi District
Teddy Nambooze	NUP	Women's Representative	Mpigi District
Pascal Mbabazi	NRM	Buwekula	Mubende District
William Ndooli Museveni	INDEP	Buwekula South	Mubende District
David Kabanda	NRM	Kasambya	Mubende District
Bashir Sempa Lubega	NRM	Mubende Municipality	Mubende District
Hope Grania Nakazibwe	NRM	Women's Representative	Mubende District
Betty Nambooze Bakireke	NUP	Mukono Municipality	Mukono District
Abdullah Kayondo Kiwanuka	NUP	Mukono North	Mukono District
Fred Kayondo	DP	Mukono South	Mukono District
Fred Ssimbwa	NUP	Nakifuma	Mukono District
Hanifa Nabukeera	NUP	Women's Representative	Mukono District
Remigio Achia	NRM	Pian	Nabilatuk District
Sylvia Vicky Awas	NRM	Women's Representative	Nabilatuk District
Moses Aleper	NRM	Chekwii	Nakapiripirit District
Peter Teko Lokeris	NRM	Chekwii East	Nakapiripirit District
Esther Davinia Anyakun	NRM	Women's Representative	Nakapiripirit District
Allan Mayanja	NUP	Nakaseke Central	Nakaseke District
Enock Nyongore	NRM	Nakaseke North	Nakaseke District
Semakula Luttamaguzi	DP	Nakaseke South	Nakaseke District
Sarah Najjuma	NRM	Women's Representative	Nakaseke District
Bernard Ssekyanzi	NRM	Budyebo	Nakasongola District
Noah Wanzala Mutebi	NRM	Nakasongola	Nakasongola District
Victorious Zawedde	INDEP	Women's Representative	Nakasongola District
Peter Babu Okeyoh	NRM	Bukholi Islands	Namayingo District
Abdu Adidwa	INDEP	Bukholi South	Namayingo District
Wanyama Michael Odwori	NRM	Namayingo South	Namayingo District
Margret Okunga Makoha	INDEPENDENT	Women's Representative	Namayingo District
John Musila	INDEP	Bubulo East	Namisindwa District
Apollo Masika	NRM	Namisindwa	Namisindwa District
Sarah Kayaki Netalisile	NRM	Women's Representative	Namisindwa District
Persis Princess Namuganza	NRM	Bukono	Namutumba District
Paul Akamba	NRM	Busiki	Namutumba District
Yona Kayogera	NRM	Busiki North	Namutumba District
Mariam Naigaga	NRM	Women's Representative	Namutumba District
John Bosco Ngoya	NRM	Bokora	Napak District
Peter Khen Angella Lochap	NRM	Bokora East	Napak District
Faith Nakut	NRM	Women's Representative	Napak District
Hashim Sulaiman	NRM	Nebbi Municipality	Nebbi District
Isaac Ismail Otingiu	NRM	Padyere	Nebbi District
Agnes Acibu	NRM	Women's Representative	Nebbi District
Abraham Isamat	NRM	Kapir	Ngora District
David Abala	INDEP	Ngora	Ngora District
Stella Isodo Apolot	FDC	Women's Representative	Ngora District
Ibanda Gerald Rwemulikya	INDEP	Ntoroko	Ntoroko District
Anne Mary Kobugabe Tumwine	NRM	Women's Representative	Ntoroko District
Kamugisha Micheal Timuzugu	NRM	Kajara	Ntungamo District
Yoona Musinguzi	NRM	Ntungamo Municipality	Ntungamo District
Zinkuratire Henry Nkwasibwe	NRM	Ruhama	Ntungamo District
Benjamin Kamukama	NRM	Ruhama East	Ntungamo District
Naome Kabasharira	INDEP	Rushenyi County	Ntungamo District
Josyline Kamateneti	NRM	Women's Representative	Ntungamo District
Tonny Awany	NRM	Nwoya	Nwoya District
Simon Oyet	FDC	Nwoya East	Nwoya District
Judith Peace Achan	NRM	Women's Representative	Nwoya District
George Didi Bhoka	NRM	Obongi	Obongi District
Zomura Manezo	NRM	Women's Representative	Obongi District
Ojok Andrew Oulanyah	NRM	Omoro	Omoro District
Peter Okot	DP	Torchi	Omoro District
Catherine Lamwaka	NRM	Women's Representative	Omoro District
Paul Omara	INDEP	Otuke	Otuke District
Julius Bua Acon	NRM	Otuke East	Otuke District
Susan Jolly Abeja	INDEP	Women's Representative	Otuke District
Charles Okello Patrick Engola	NRM	Oyam North	Oyam District
Eunice Otuko Apio	UPC	Oyam North	Oyam District
Betty Amongi Akena	UPC	Oyam South	Oyam District
Alum Sandra Ogwang Santa	UPC	Women's Representative	Oyam District
Christopher Komakech	INDEP	Aruu	Pader District
Santa Okot	PPP	Aruu North	Pader District
Achiro Paska Menya	INDEP	Women's Representative	Pader District
Emmanuel Ongiertho	FDC	Jonam	Pakwach District
Jane Pacutho Avur	NRM	Women's Representative	Pakwach District
Polycap Ogwari	INDEP	Agule	Pallisa District
Derrick Orone	NRM	Gogonyo	Pallisa District
Richard Oriebo Oseku	NRM	Kibale	Pallisa District
Sam Otukol	NRM	Pallisa	Pallisa District
Kevin Ojinga Kaala	NRM	Women's Representative	Pallisa District
Gyaviira Ssemwanga	NRM	Buyamba	Rakai District
Boaz Kasirabo Ninsiima	NRM	Kooki	Rakai District
Juliet Kinyamatama Suubi	INDEP	Women's Representative	Rakai District
Henry Aliganyira Musasiizi	NRM	Rubanda East	Rubanda District
Moses Mwongyere Kamuntu	INDEP	Rubanda West	Rubanda District
Prossy Akampurira	NRM	Women's Representative	Rubanda District
John Ntamuhira Twesigye	NRM	Bunyaruguru	Rubirizi District
Mohammed Kato	NRM	Katerera	Rubirizi District
Grace Batiringaya Kasende	NRM	Women's Representative	Rubirizi District
Ndyomugyenyi Roland	INDEP	Rukiga	Rukiga District
Caroline Kamusiime	NRM	Women's Representative	Rukiga District
Naboth Namanya	FDC	Rubabo	Rukungiri District
Jim Muhwezi Katugugu	NRM	Rujumbura	Rukungiri District
Elisa Rutahigwa	NRM	Rukungiri Municipality	Rukungiri District
Medius Kaharata Natukunda	NRM	Women's Representative	Rukungiri District
Amos Kibwika Kankunda	NRM	Rwampara	Rwampara District
Julius Tusiime	INDEP	Rwampara East	Rwampara District
Molly Musiime Asiimwe	NRM	Women's Representative	Rwampara District
Theodore Ssekikubo	NRM	Lwemiyaga	Sembabule District
Shartsi Musherure Kuteesa	INDEP	Mawogola North	Sembabule District
Gorreth Namugga	NUP	Mawogola South	Sembabule District
Anifa Kawooya Bangirana	NRM	Mawogola West	Sembabule District
Mary Begumisa	NRM	Women's Representative	Sembabule District
Elijah Okupa	INDEP	Kasilo	Serere District
Fred Opolot	NRM	Pingire	Serere District
Patrick Okabe	INDEP	Serere	Serere District
Hellen Adoa	NRM	Women's Representative	Serere District
Dickson Kateshumbwa	NRM	Sheema Municipality	Sheema District
Naome Kibaaju	NRM	Sheema North	Sheema District
Dickens Mushemeza	INDEP	Sheema South	Sheema District
Rosemary Nyakikongoro	NRM	Women's Representative	Sheema District
Isaias Johny Ssasaga	FDC	Budadiri East	Sironko District
Nandala Mafabi	FDC	Budadiri West	Sironko District
Florence Nambozo Wamala		Women's Representative	Sironko District
Joan Acom Alobo	FDC	City Womam MP	Soroti City
Moses Okia Attan	FDC	East Division	Soroti City
Jonathan Ebwalu	INDEP	Soroti West	Soroti City
Cosmas Elotu	NRM	Dakabela	Soroti District
Kenneth Esiangu	INDEP	Gweri	Soroti District
Samuel Eninu	INDEP	Soroti	Soroti District
Anna Ebaju Adeke	FDC	Women's Representative	Soroti District
Mario Kamya Obinga	NRM	Terego East	Terego District
Joel Leku	NRM	Terego West	Terego District
Rose Obinga	NRM	Women's Representative	Terego District
Annet Nyakecho	INDEP	Tororo County North	Tororo District
Fredrick Angura	NRM	Tororo County South	Tororo District
Yeri Ofwono Apollo	NRM	Tororo Municipality	Tororo District
Jacob Markson Oboth	NRM	West Budama Central	Tororo District
Maximus Ochai	NRM	West Budama North	Tororo District
Fox Odoi-Oywelowo	NRM	West Budama North East	Tororo District
Emmanuel Otala Othiem	NRM	West Budama South	Tororo District
Jacinta Athieno Ayo	INDEP	Women's Representative	Tororo District
Sseggona Medard	NUP	Busiro East	Wakiso District
Paul Nsubuga	NUP	Busiro North	Wakiso District
Charles Matovu	NUP	Busiro South	Wakiso District
Michael Mbwatekamwa Kakembo	NUP	Entebbe Municipality	Wakiso District
Ibrahim Ssemujju Nganda	FDC	Kira Municipality	Wakiso District
Muwada Nkunyingi	NUP	Kyadondo East	Wakiso District
David Sserukenya	NUP	Makindye Ssabagabo Municipality	Wakiso District
Musoke Nsereko Wakayima	FDC	Nansana Municipality	Wakiso District
Betty Esther Naluyima	NUP	Women's Representative	Wakiso District
Siraje Brahan Ezama	NRM	Aringa	Yumbe District
Huda Abason Oleru	NRM	Aringa East	Yumbe District
Godfrey Onzima	NRM	Aringa North	Yumbe District
Yorke Odria Alioni	NRM	Aringa South	Yumbe District
Naima Melsa Gule Avako	NRM	Women's Representative	Yumbe District
Gabriel Okumu	NRM	Okoro	Zombo District
Biyika Lawrence Songa	NRM	Ora	Zombo District
Esther Afoyochan	NRM	Women's Representative	Zombo District
