= Wakooli Godfrey Matembu =

Ugandan politician (born 1986)

Hon. Wakooli Godfrey Matembu
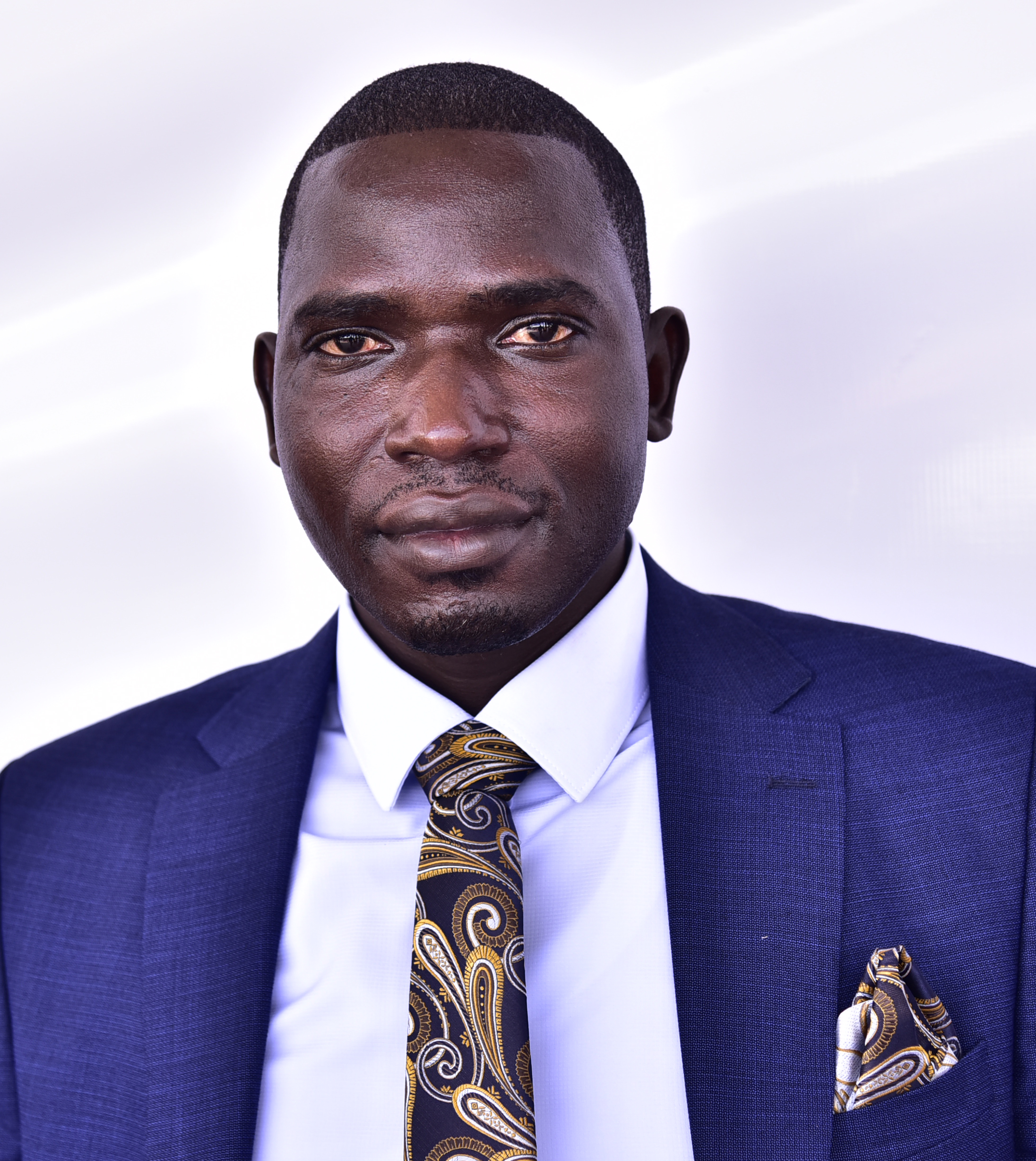

Member of the Parliament of Uganda for Butiru County
- Incumbent
- Assumed office 2021–present
- Constituency: Butiru County, Manafwa District

Personal details
- Born: September 26, 1986 (age 40)
- Party: National Resistance Movement
- Occupation: Politician

Wakooli Godfrey Matembu (born 26 September 1986) is a Ugandan politician and member of the National Resistance Movement (NRM). He has served in the Parliament of Uganda since 2021 as the Member of Parliament for Butiru County in Manafwa District. He was re-elected as Member of Parliament for Butiru County in the January 2026 elections.

== Political career ==
Wakooli was elected to the Eleventh Parliament in the 2021 general elections, winning the Butiru County seat with 16,070 votes on the NRM ticket.

He serves on Parliament’s Committee on Defence and Internal Affairs. In committee and plenary, he has contributed to oversight of the security and internal affairs sectors, including scrutiny of supplementary budget requests for the Ministry of Defence and matters related to the Police Exodus SACCO.

== Constituency work ==
Wakooli has been involved in lobbying for road rehabilitation in Butiru County. In April 2025, the 10.7 km Butiru–Makenya–Tororo road rehabilitation was launched under the National Oil Seed Program (an IFAD–Government of Uganda initiative), with local media quoting Wakooli on the expected economic benefits for farmers and traders between Manafwa and neighboring Tororo District. Earlier, he had publicly addressed concerns about the road’s condition and funding timelines.

Wakooli has donated to his constituents at least 100,000 coffee seedlings to support agriculture.

== See also ==
- Parliament of Uganda
- List of members of the eleventh Parliament
- Manafwa District
- National Resistance Movement

== External Link ==
- New Vision Newspaper
