= Juliet Kakande Nakabuye =

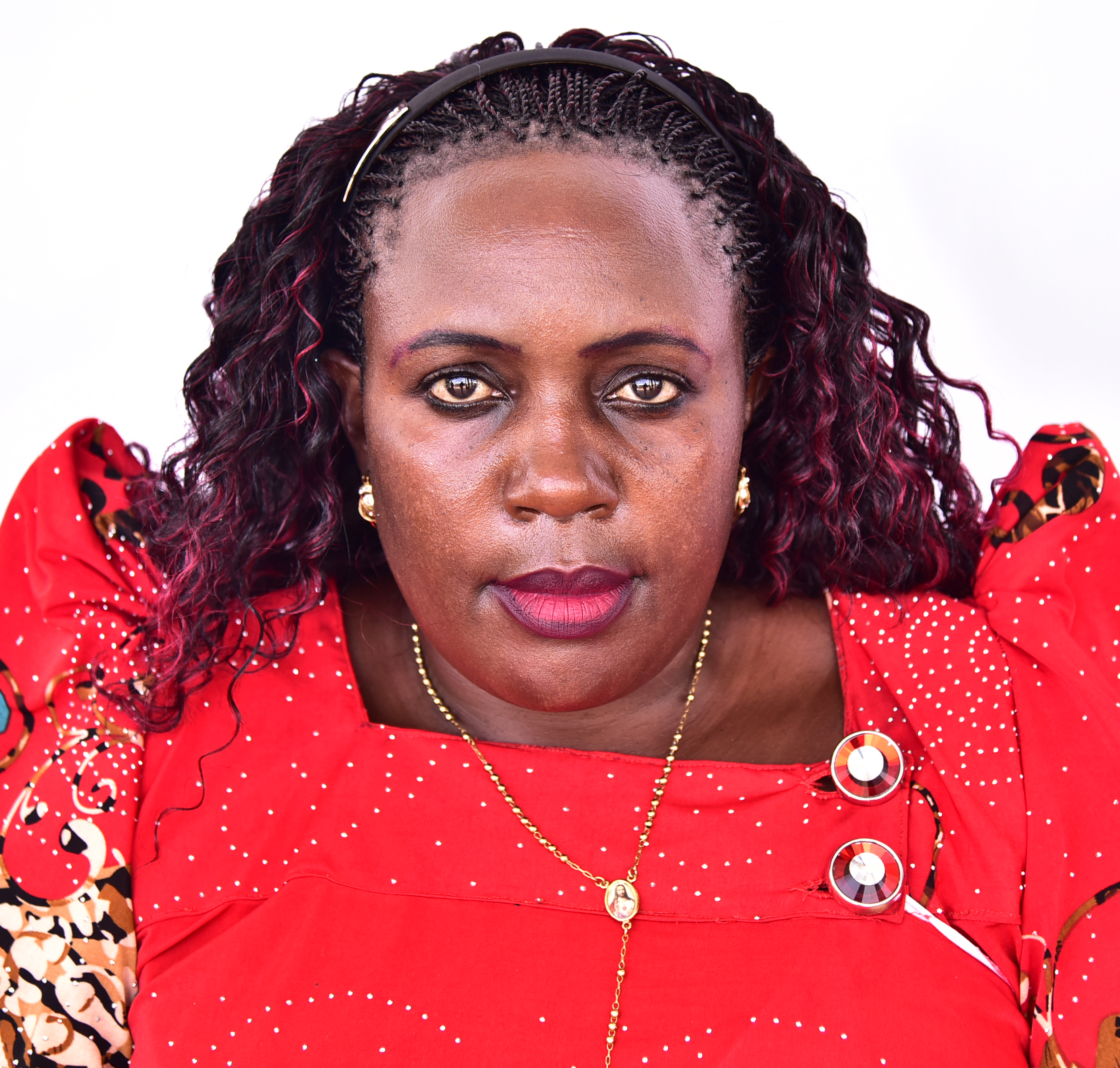
- Juliet Kakande Nakabuye

Woman Member of Parliament Masaka City
- Incumbent
- Assumed office 24 May 2021

Personal details
- Born: Juliet Kakande Nakabuye; 13 January 1978 (age 48)
- Party: National Unity Platform
- Occupation: Politician

Juliet Kakande Nakabuye (born on 13 January 1978) is a Ugandan politician in the eleventh Parliament of Uganda under the National Unity Platform (NUP) for Masaka City.

== Political career ==
She belongs to the Equal Opportunities Committee and Public Service and Local Government Committee at the Parliament of Uganda. She was among the Masaka city leaders who petitioned the Lands Ministry over falsification of titles.

== See also ==
- List of members of the eleventh Parliament of Uganda
