= Jimbricky Norman Ochero =

Ugandan politician

Hon. Jimbricky Norman Ochero
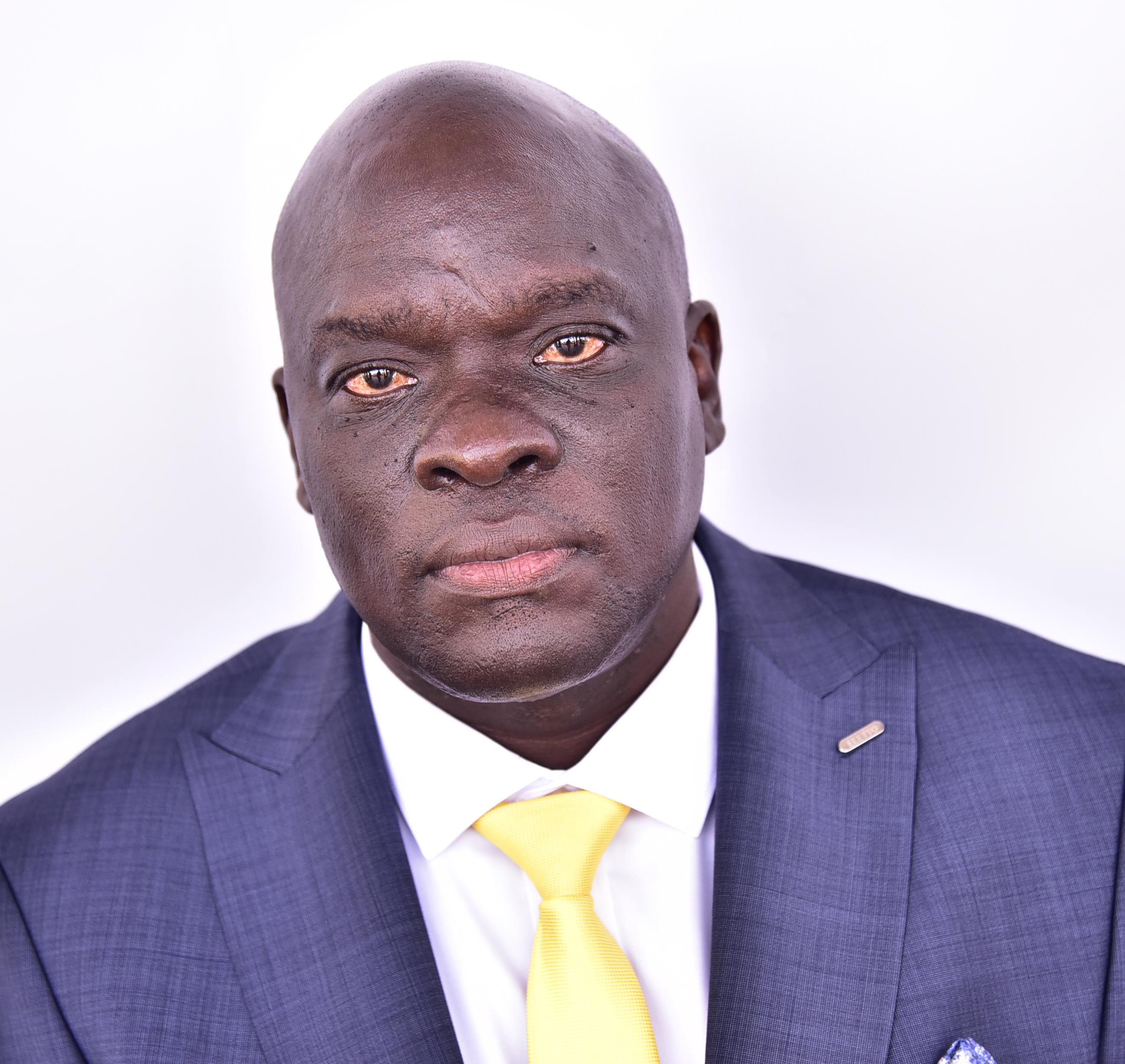

Member of Parliament for Labwor County, Abim District
- Incumbent
- Assumed office 2021

Personal details
- Born: Norman Jimbricky Ochero
- Party: National Resistance Movement
- Occupation: Politician
- Known for: Political leadership in Abim District
- Committees: Committee on Public Accounts (Local Government)

Jimbricky Norman Ochero, also known as Norman Jimbricky Ochero, is a member of the 11th Parliament of Uganda (2021 to 2026), elected in the 2021 general election, representing Abim District, Labwor constituency. Before joining the eleventh Parliament of Uganda, he served as the Local Council Five Chairperson of Abim district. He was elected to the parliament on the ticket of National Resistance Movement (NRM). In the parliament of Uganda, he serves on the Committee on Public Accounts (Local Government).

== See also ==
- Abim District
- List of members of the eleventh Parliament of Uganda
- National Resistance Movement
- Janet Grace Akech Okorimoe
- Parliament of Uganda
