= Susan Achola Engola =

Ugandan politician

- Born: Achola Susan
- Citizenship: Uganda
- Occupation: Politician
- Years active: 2011 to date
- Political party: Uganda People's Congress

Achola Suzan Engola is a Ugandan politician. In 2011, she was elected as a member of parliament for Apac District. She was re-elected in the 2021 Ugandan general election, held on 14 January 2021.

She is a member of the Uganda People's Congress political party.

== See also ==
- List of members of the eleventh Parliament of Uganda
- Uganda People's Congress
- Member of Parliament
- Parliament of Uganda
- Apac District
