= Naima Melsa Gule Avako =

Ugandan politician

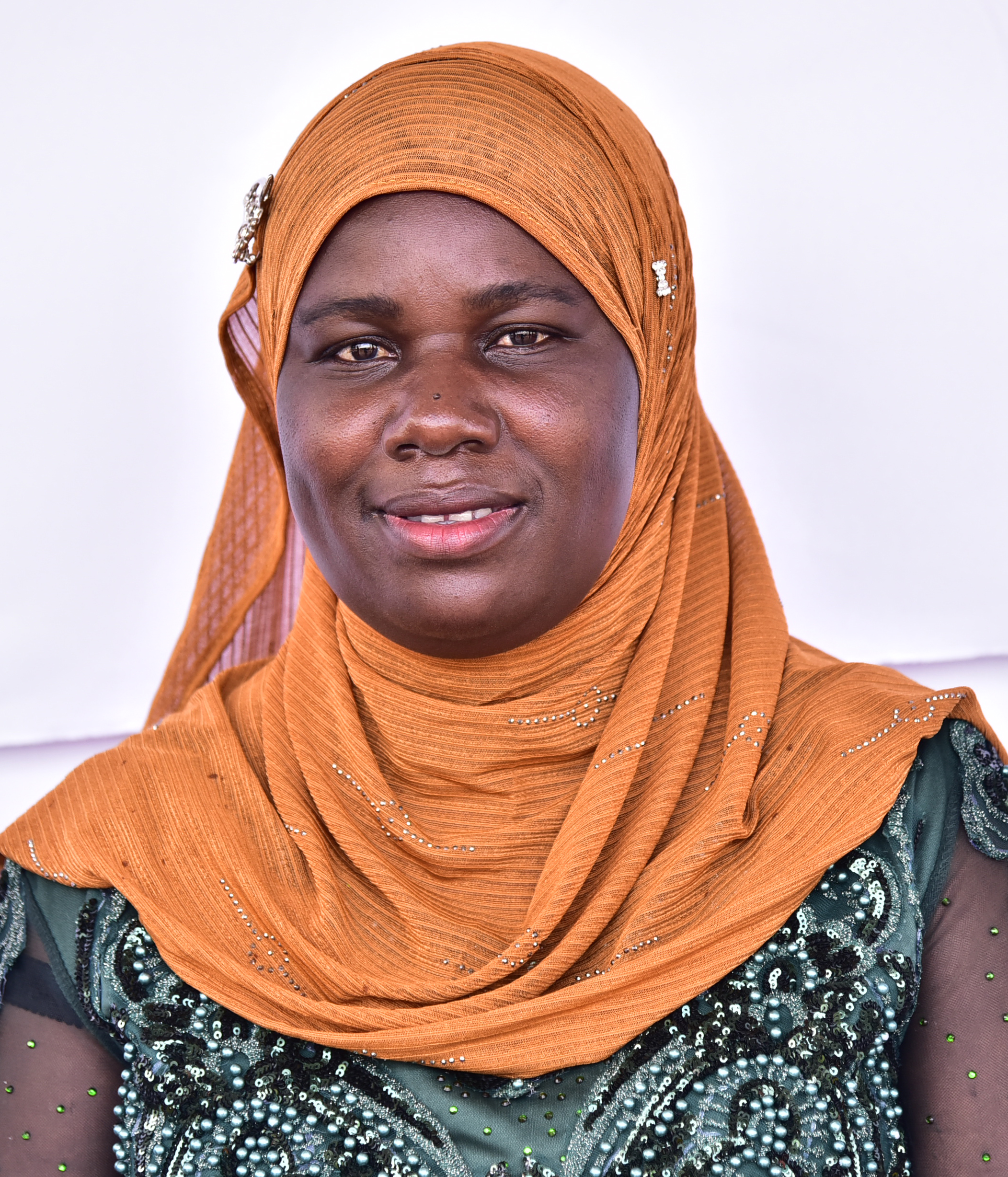

Member of the Uganda Parliament for Yumbe

Personal details
- Party: National Resistance Movement

Naima Melsa Gule Avako is a Ugandan politician and member of the parliament. She was elected in office as a female representative in parliament for Yumbe district during the 2021 Uganda general elections.

She is a member of the ruling National Resistance Movement party.

== See also ==
- National Resistance Movement
- List of members of the eleventh Parliament of Uganda
- Parliament of Uganda
- Yumbe District
- Member of Parliament.
