= Pauline Kemirembe Kyaka =

Ugandan Politician

Hon. Pauline Kemirembe Kyaka
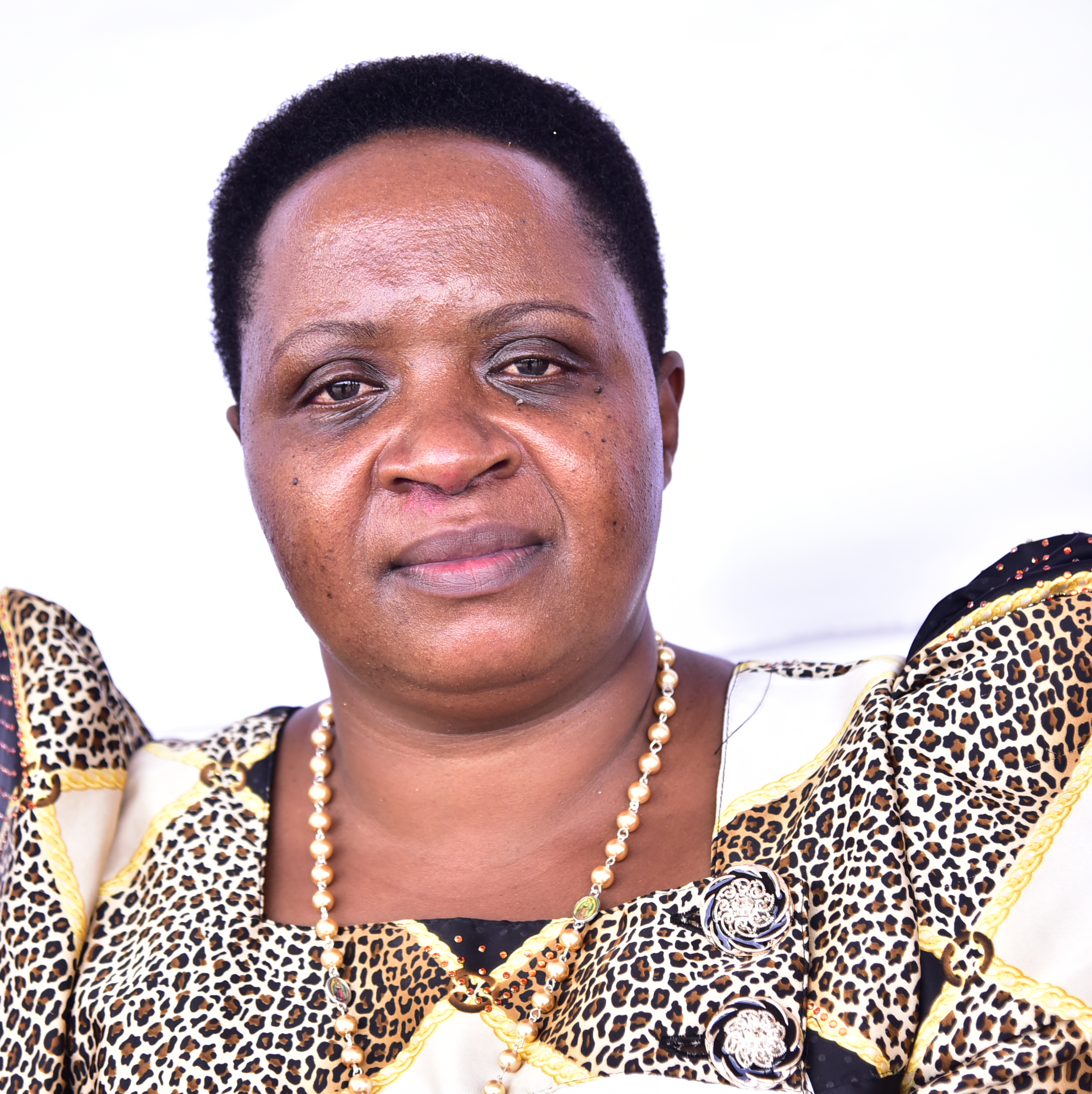

Member of Parliament, Woman Representative, Lyantonde District
- In office 2016–Incumbent

Personal details
- Born: 16 June 1977 (age 49) Uganda
- Citizenship: Uganda
- Party: National Resistance Movement
- Spouse: Married
- Education: Makerere University
- Occupation: Politician, teacher
- Profession: Teacher
- Known for: Education advocacy, leadership in Parliament
- Committees: Committee on Human Rights; Committee on Health

Pauline Kemirembe Kyaka also known as Pauline Kyaka, (born 16 June 1977) is a Ugandan politician and teacher. She is the district woman representative of Lyantonde District in the 11th Parliament of Uganda. The incumbent Woman member of parliament, Grace Namara Lutemba lost to Pauline Kyaka, her NRM rival.

== Early life and education ==
Pauline was born on 16 June 1977. In 1990, she completed her Primary Leaving Examinations from St. Maria Goretti Preparatory School, Kabale. She later joined St. Mary's College, Rushoroza for Uganda Certificate of Education and completed in 1994. In 1997, she attained Uganda Advanced Certificate of Education from St Theresa Girls Secondary School, Bwanda. In 2000, she was awarded a bachelor's degree of Arts in Education from Makerere University.

== Career ==
From 2005 to date, she worked as the director at St. Pauls Kindergarten Primary School, Lyantonde. Between 2000 and 2002, she was employed as the teacher at St. Gonzaga S.S., Lyantonde. From 2016 to date, she has been serving as the Member of Parliament at the Parliament of Uganda.

== Other responsibilities ==
She is on the Committee on Human Rights and the Committee on Health as a member at the Parliament of Uganda.

== Personal life ==
She is married. Her hobbies are; Netball, Making friends, Reading novels, news papers, Networking and Charity work.

== See also ==
- List of members of the eleventh Parliament of Uganda.
- Parliament of Uganda.
- List of members of the tenth Parliament of Uganda.
- Lyantonde District.
- National Resistance Movement (NRM).
- Member of Parliament.
