= Jane Kabajungu Bainomugisha =

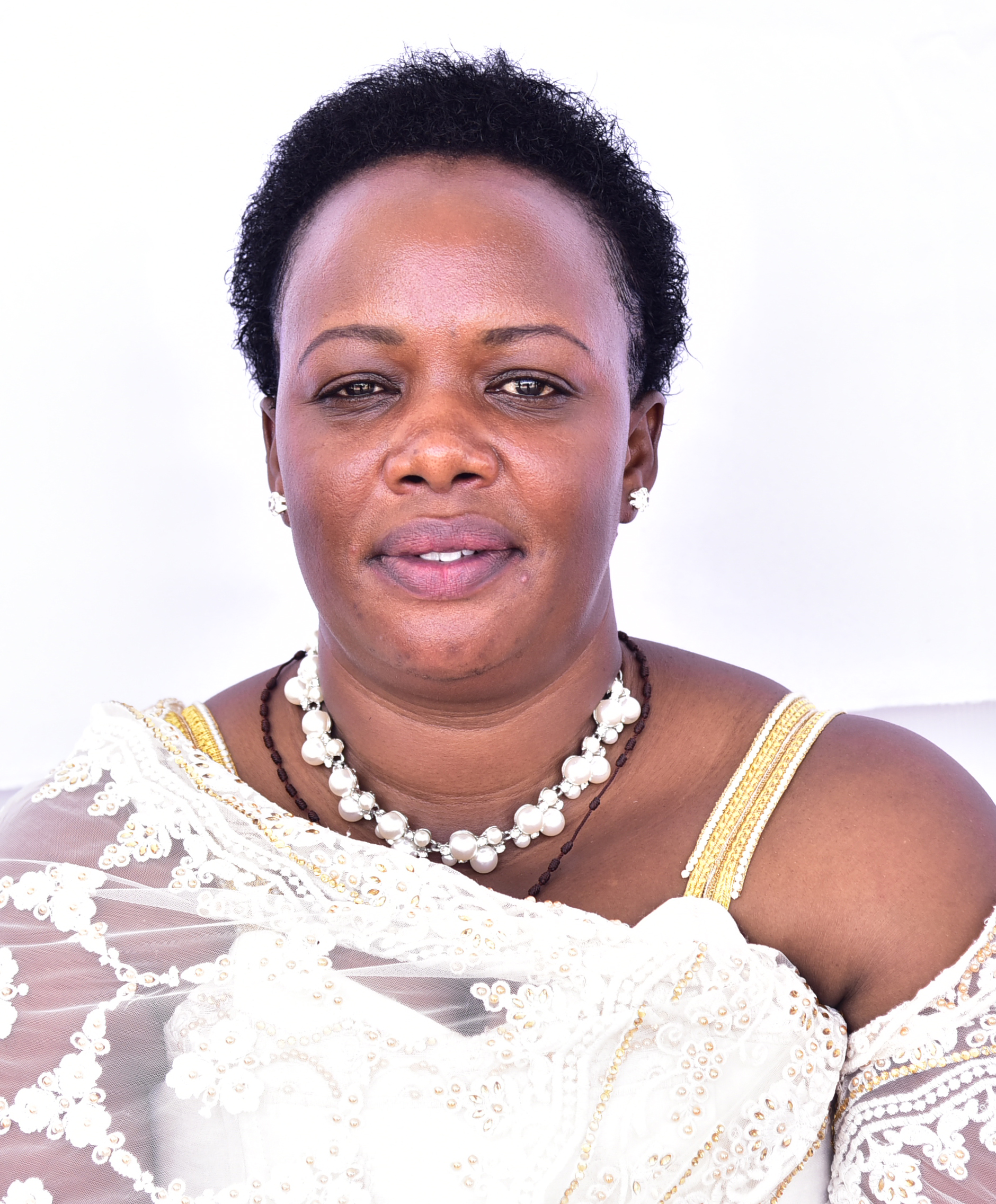
Bainomugisha Jane Kabajungu

Jane Kabajungu Bainomugisha (born on 10 December 1980) is a Uganda politician and woman member of parliament for Ibanda District in the eleventh Parliament of Uganda under the National Resistance Movement political party. She represents her constituents in matters of national importance at the Parliament of Uganda.

== See also ==
- List of members of the eleventh Parliament of Uganda
- Ibanda District
- Thomas Tayebwa
- Nobert Mao
- Chris Bariomunsi
