= Judith Peace Achan =

Ugandan politician

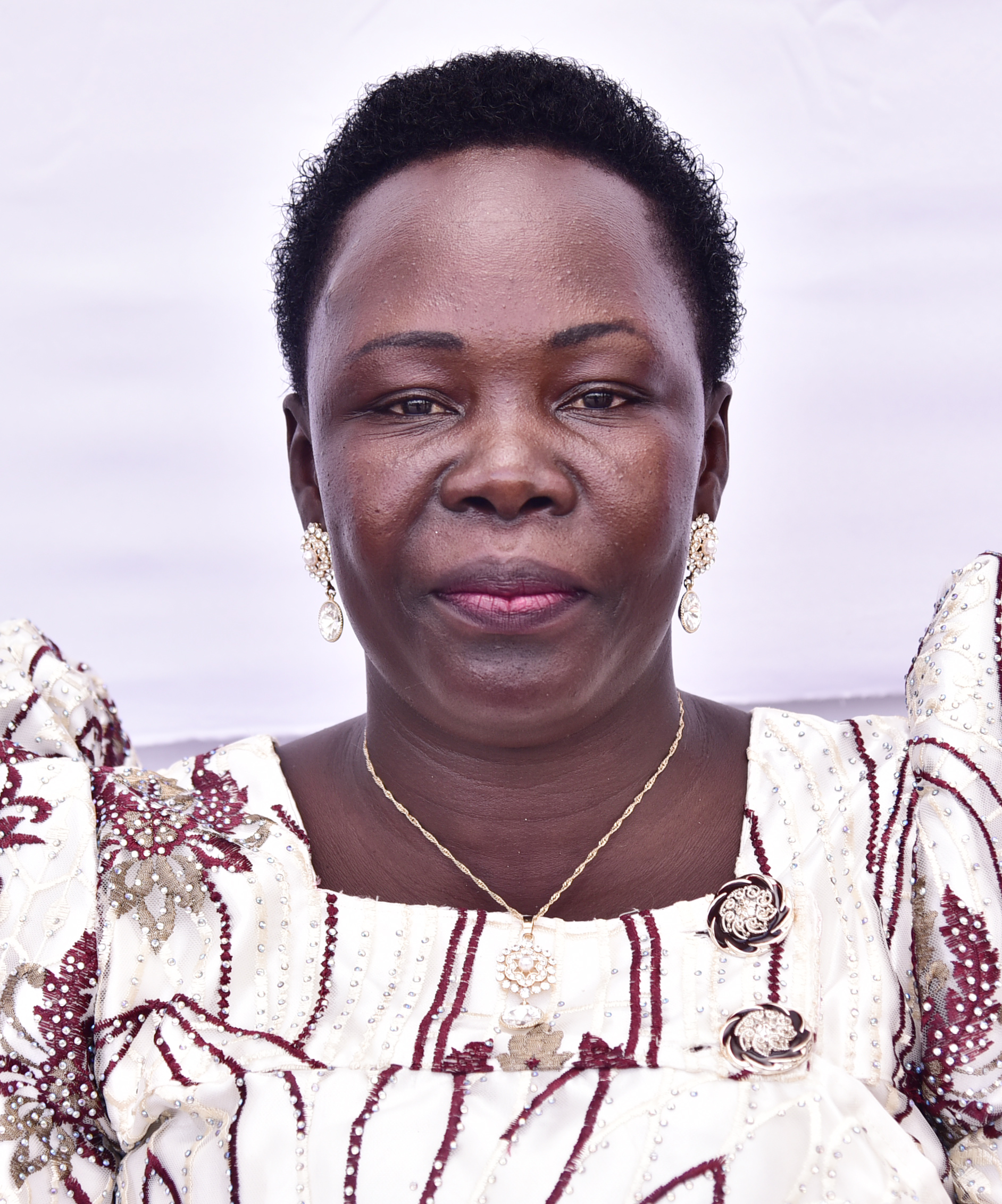

Woman Member of Parliament for Nwoya District

Member of parliament
- Incumbent
- Assumed office 2021

Personal details
- Citizenship: Ugandan
- Political party: National Resistance Movement
- Spouse: Mwani Amos
- Known for: Politics
- Committees: Committee on Foreign Affairs; Committee on Climate Change

Judith Peace Achan (born 23 April 1983) is a Ugandan politician and member of the parliament. She was elected in office as a woman Member to represent Nwoya district during the 2021 Uganda general elections.

She is a member of the National Resistance Movement party.

In the eleventh parliament, she serves on the Committee on Foreign Affairs and currently serving on the Committee of Climate Change.

== Personal life ==
She was born to the late Kinyera Alfred Donasiano commonly referred to as lapwony Don and Acayo Santa from Aporolala Wianaka, Got Apwoyo sub county in Nwoya district. She is married to Mwani Amos from Koch Goma Town Council.

== See also ==
- List of members of the eleventh Parliament of Uganda
- Nwoya District
