= Sarah Kayaki Netalisile =

Ugandan politician

Sarah Kayagi Netalisile
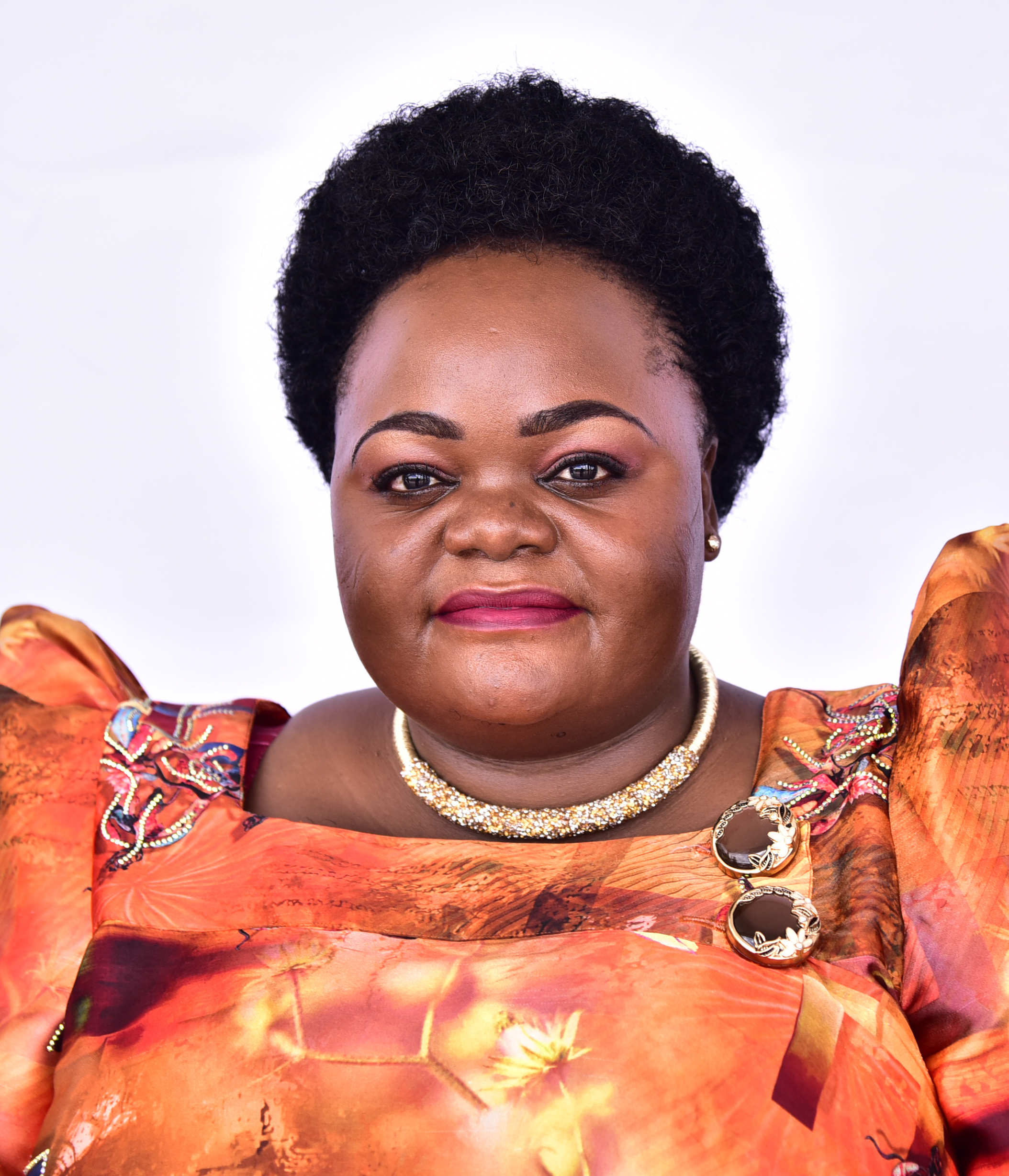
- Citizenship: Ugandan
- Known for: Politics
- Title: Member of parliament

Sarah Kayagi Netalisile is a Ugandan politician and member of the parliament. She was elected in office as a woman Member to represent Namisindwa district located in the Eastern part of Uganda during the 2021 Uganda general elections.She would like to be replaced by Dr.Sarah Bwayo in the 2026 general elections, Who works with the Uganda AIDS Commission as Head Resource Mobilization.

She is a member of the ruling National Resistance Movement party.

== See also ==
- List of members of the eleventh Parliament of Uganda
- Namisindwa District
- National Resistance Movement
- Parliament of Uganda
- Member of Parliament
