= Resty Nanteza =

Ugandan politician

- Citizenship: Uganda
- Occupations: Politician and radio presenter
- Employer(s): NBS radio Parliament of Uganda; Buikwe district Nyenga Division
- Known for: Politics
- Political party: Forum for Democratic Change

Resty Nanteza is a Ugandan politician. She is also a radio presenter at NBS radio in Jinja city owned by former member of parliament Hon Igeme Nathan Nabeta. In 2021, she was a candidate to be the woman representative in parliament for the Buikwe district in the 2021 Uganda general elections, after serving as the chairperson of Nyenga Division. She managed to garner 41,561 votes, and was reported as having won in some early lists of results. However, she lost to Diana Mutasingwa (NRM) who won the election with 43,215 votes. Nanteza challenged the results in the courts.

She is a member of the Forum for Democratic Change party.

== See also ==
- List of members of the eleventh Parliament of Uganda
- Forum for Democratic Change
- Buikwe District
- Member of Parliament
- Parliament of Uganda
