= Jane Awich =

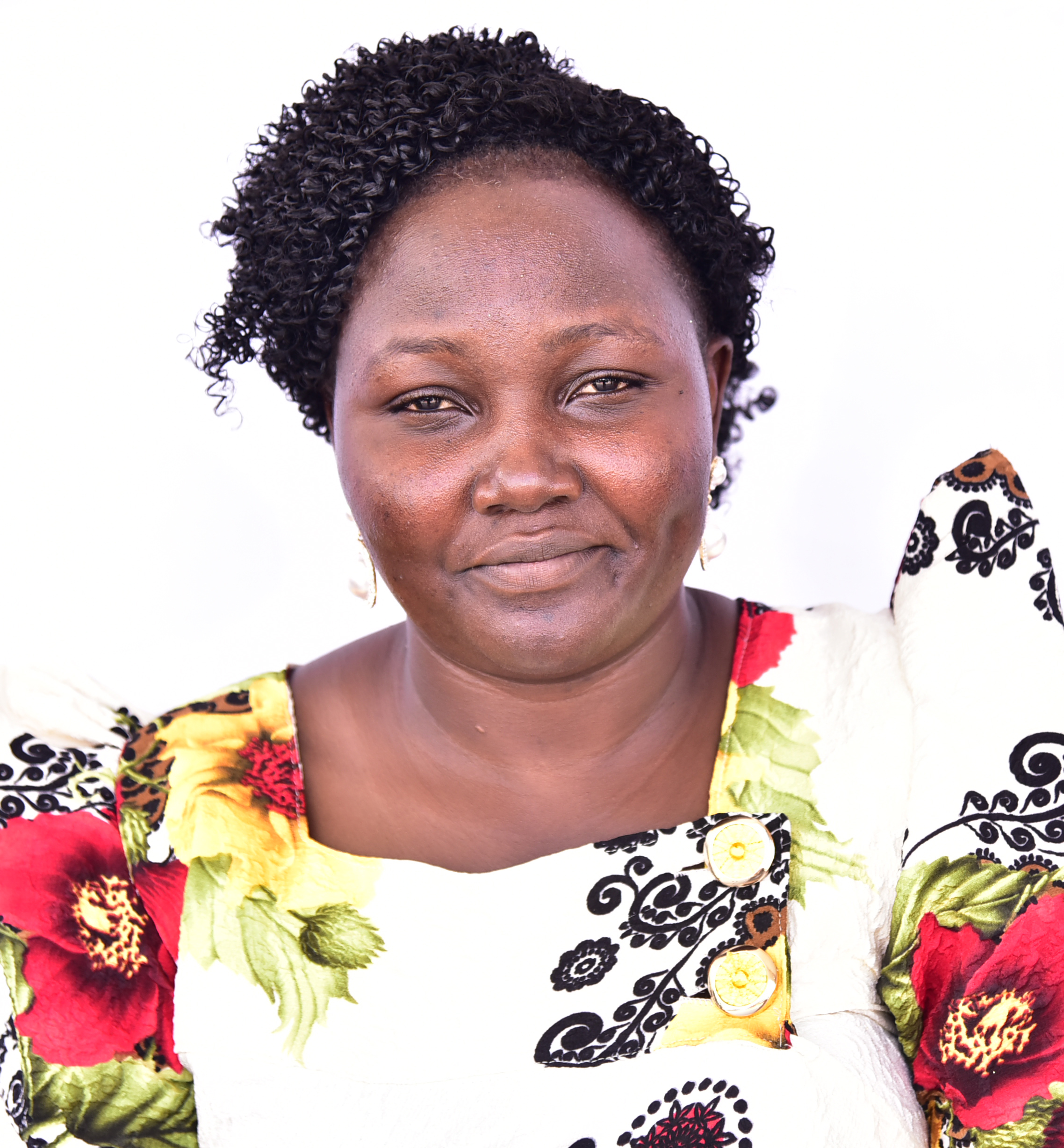
- Jane Awich

Woman Member of Parliament for Kaberamaido District
- Incumbent
- Assumed office 2021

Personal details
- Party: National Resistance Movement

Jane Awich is a Ugandan politician and Women's Representative at the 11th Parliament of Uganda representing Kaberamaido District under the National Resistance Movement political party.

== Career ==
Jane joined the Parliament of Uganda in 2021 for Kaberamaido district and also serves on the Education and Sports Committee, National Economy Committee, and Physical Infrastructure Committee at the Parliament of Uganda.

== See also ==
- Kaberamaido
- List of members of the eleventh Parliament of Uganda
- Anita Among
- Thomas Tayebwa
