= Tonny Awany =

Ugandan politician

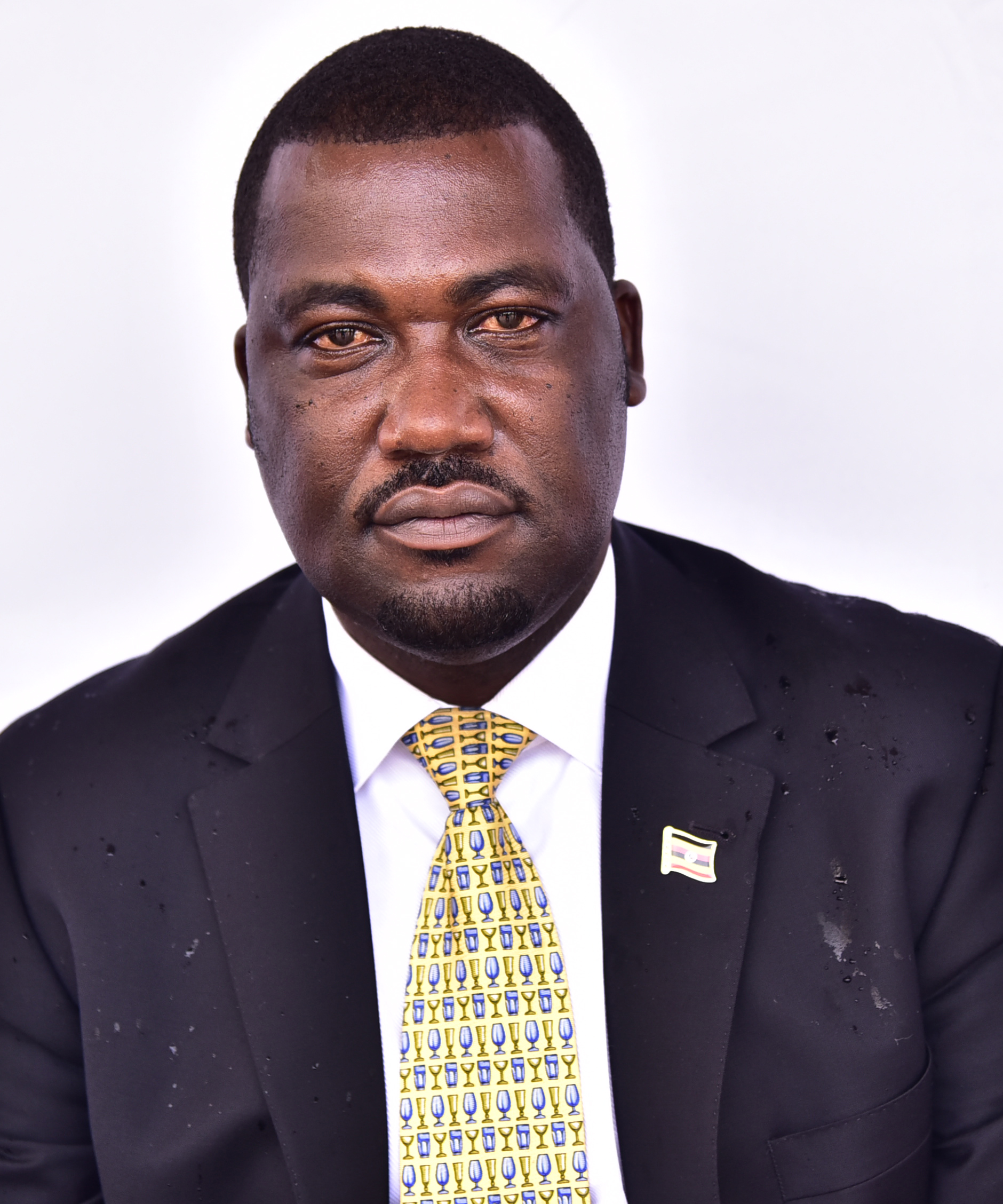
- Born: May 29, 1975 (age 51)
- Citizenship: Ugandan
- Education: Makerere University
- Known for: Represented Nwoya County in the Eleventh Parliament of Uganda
- Political party: National Resistance Movement

Tonny Awany (born 29 May 1975) is a Ugandan politician in the eleventh Parliament of Uganda representing Nwoya county under the National Resistance Movement political party.

== Political career ==
He served as the first Secretary and Acting Deputy Head of Mission Uganda Embassy, Abu Dhabi, United Arab Emirates (UAE) before joining the Parliament. He is the vice chairperson of the new parliamentary land committee aiming to streamline governance of land. He was also the COVID-19 Select Committee acting chairperson. He is also serving on the parliamentary committee on physical infrastructure as the vice chairperson.

== See also ==
- List of members of the eleventh Parliament of Uganda
- Sharon Balmoi Laker
