= Rose Obinga =

Ugandan politician

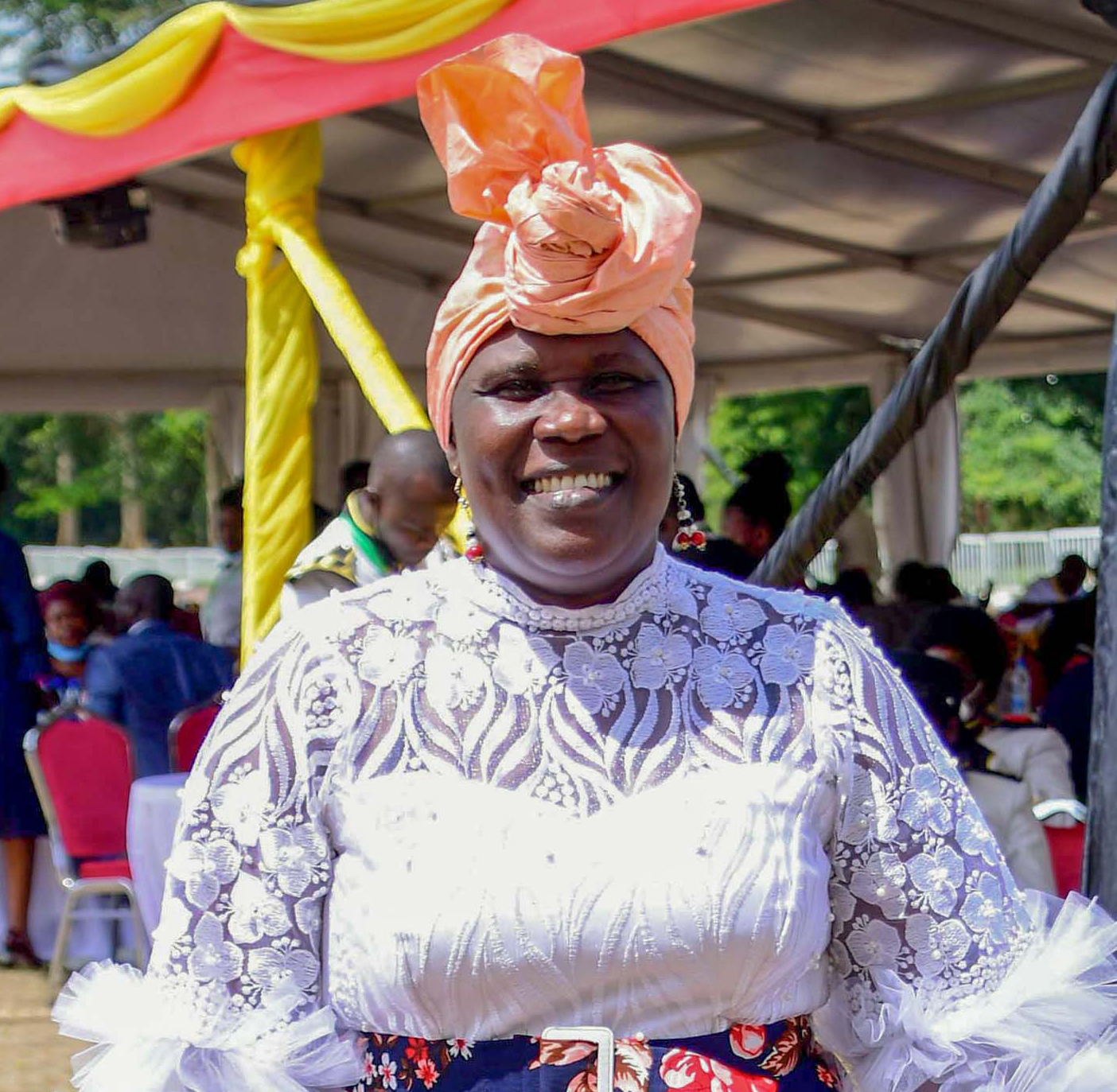
- Woman MP of Terego District, Rose Obinga
- Citizenship: Ugandan
- Known for: Politics
- Title: Member of parliament

Rose Obinga is a Ugandan politician and member of the parliament. She was elected in office as a woman Member to represent Terego district during the 2021 Uganda general elections.

She is a member of the ruling National Resistance Movement party.

== See also ==
- List of members of the eleventh Parliament of Uganda
- Torego District
- National Resistance Movement
- Parliament of Uganda.
- Member of Parliament.
