= Okullo Aabuka Jallon Anthony =

Ugandan politician

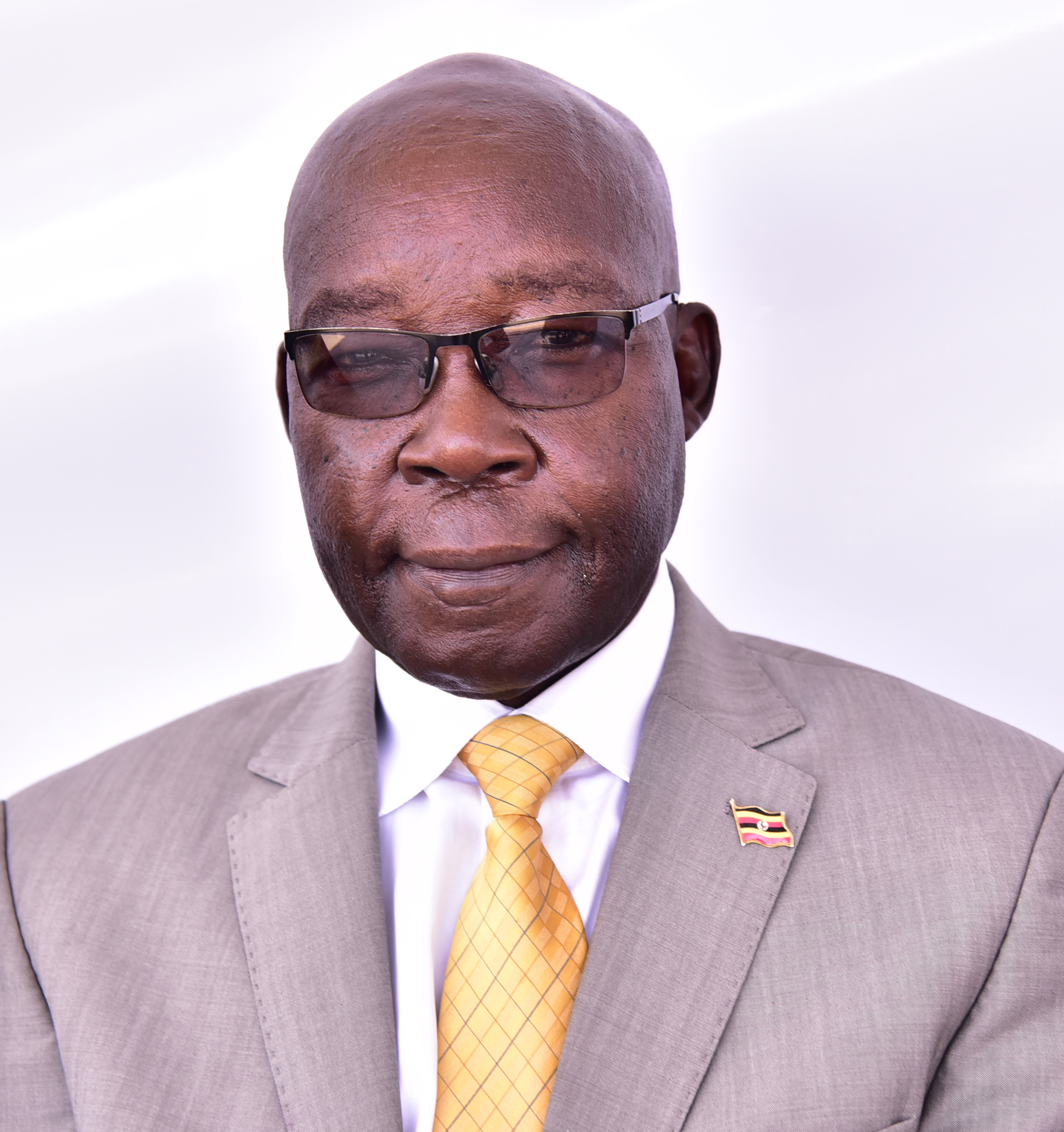
Okullo Aabuka Jallon Anthony

Okullo Aabuka Jallon Anthony also commonly known as Okullo Anthony is a Ugandan politician representing Lamwo District as a member of Parliament in the eleventh Parliament of Uganda under the National Resistance Movement political party.

== Work history ==
Okullu also works as the medical doctor for the Sheraton Hotel.

== See also ==
- List of members of the eleventh Parliament of Uganda
- Wikipedia: Equity lists/Nationality/Uganda
- Dorcus Acen
- Joan Acom Alobo
