= Betty Louke Chelain =

Ugandan politician

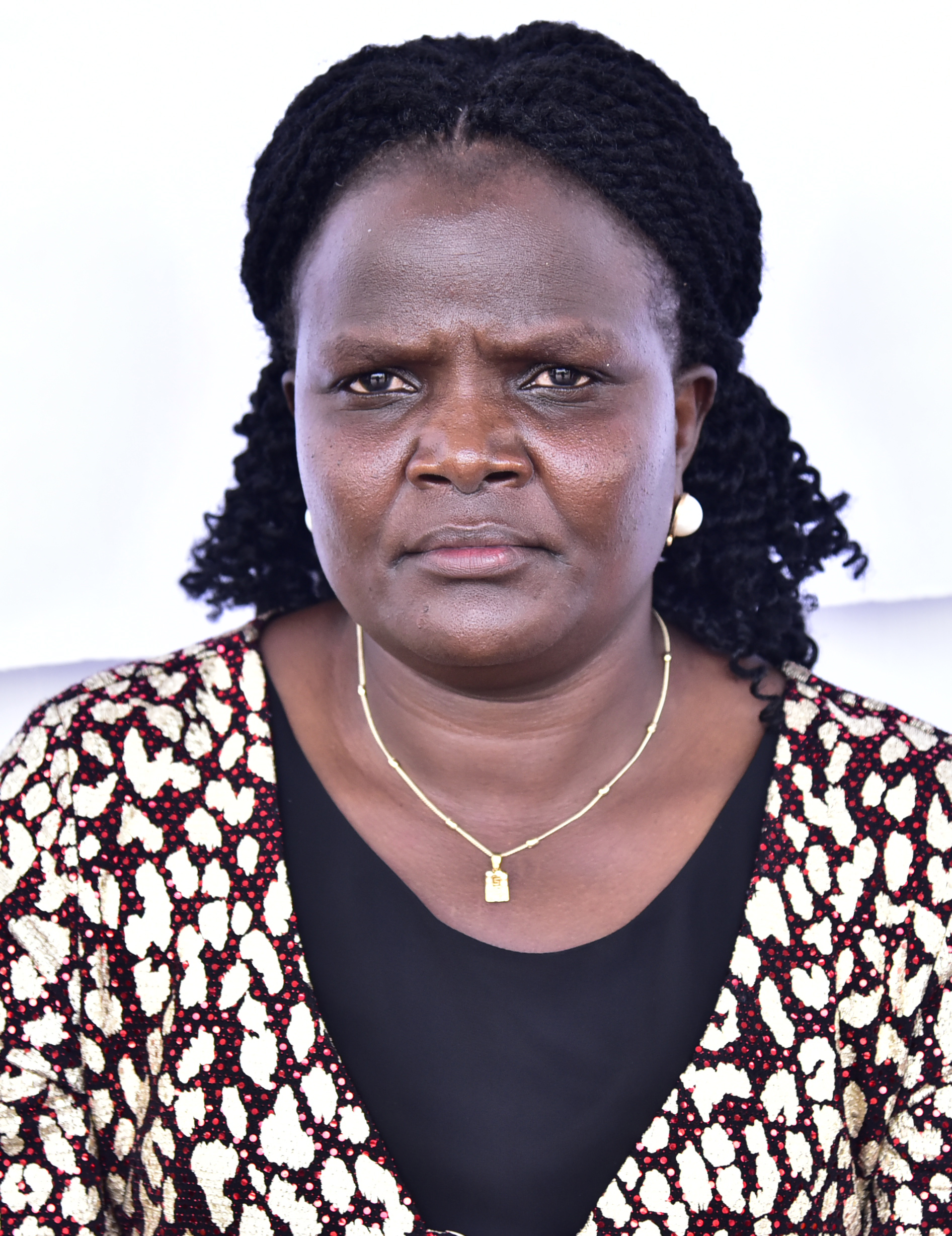
- Occupation: politician
- Political party: National Resistance Movement

Betty Louke Chelain is a Ugandan politician and female member of parliament. In 2021, she was elected as a female representative in parliament for Amudat district.

She is a member of the ruling National Resistance Movement political party. In the 11th parliament, Betty serves on the Committee on Health.

== See also ==
- List of members of the eleventh Parliament of Uganda.
- Amudat District.
- National Resistance Movement
- Parliament of Uganda.
