= Medius Kaharata Natukunda =

Ugandan politician

Medius Kaharata Natukunda is a Ugandan politician and woman member of parliament. In 2021, she was elected as a woman representative in parliament for Rukungiri District during the 2021 Uganda general elections.

She is a member of the ruling National Resistance Movement political party.

== See also ==
- List of members of the eleventh Parliament of Uganda.
- National Resistance Movement
- Rukungiri District.
- Parliament of Uganda.
- Member of Parliament.
