= Dorothy Nyakato =

Ugandan politician

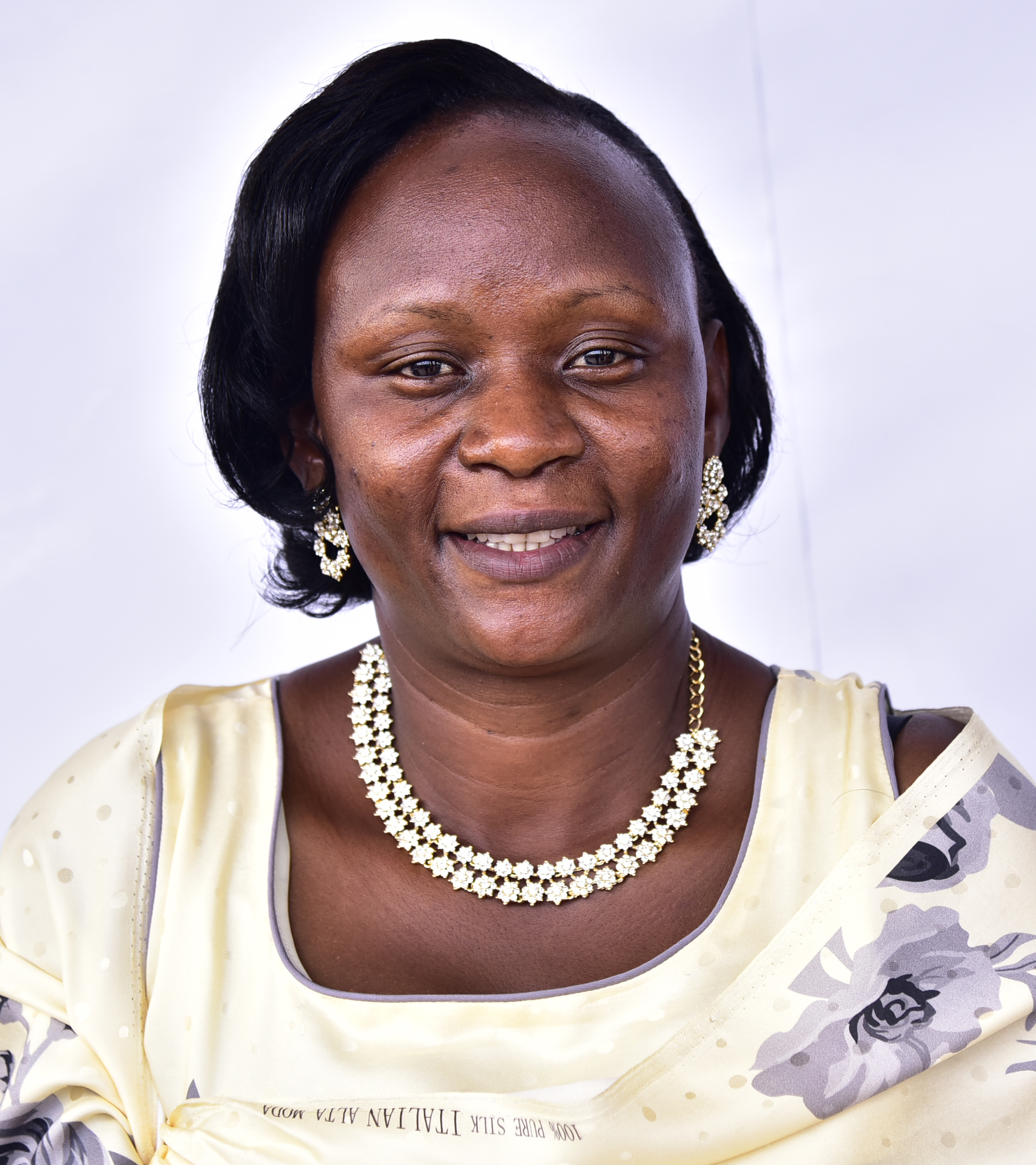
- Citizenship: Uganda
- Occupation: Politician
- Notable work: Woman representative of parliament of Kitagwenda district the eleventh Parliament of Uganda
- Title: 11th parliament on the Committee on Education and Sports.
- Political party: National Resistance Movement
- Spouse: Robert Kabandize

Dorothy Nyakato Nzibonera is a Ugandan politician who is the Woman Member of Parliament for Kitagwenda District in Uganda in the eleventh Parliament of the Republic of Uganda. She is affiliated to the National Resistance Movement the ruling political party in Uganda after the January, 2021 polls. She is also an accountant by profession and has served as an accounting assistant at the Human Rights Center Uganda.

In the 11th parliament, she serves on the Committee on Education and Sports.

== Background and education ==
Dorothy Nyakato hails from the Kitagwenda District in Western Uganda. She is a Christian and is an Anglican. Dorothy is married to Robert Kabandize as of March, 2022.

== Political career ==
She is the woman representative of parliament of Kitagwenda district the eleventh Parliament of Uganda. She defeated Asiimwe Joan of the Forum for Democratic Change, Ninsiima Grace who had lost to Dorothy in the primaries and Kenyonyonzi Efrance who contested as independents in the January, 2021 polls to win the election by majority of the votes cast. She has also served as an Accounts Assistant at the Human Rights Center, Uganda a role she holds to date.

== See also ==
- List of members of the eleventh Parliament of Uganda
