= Christine Akello =

Ugandan politician

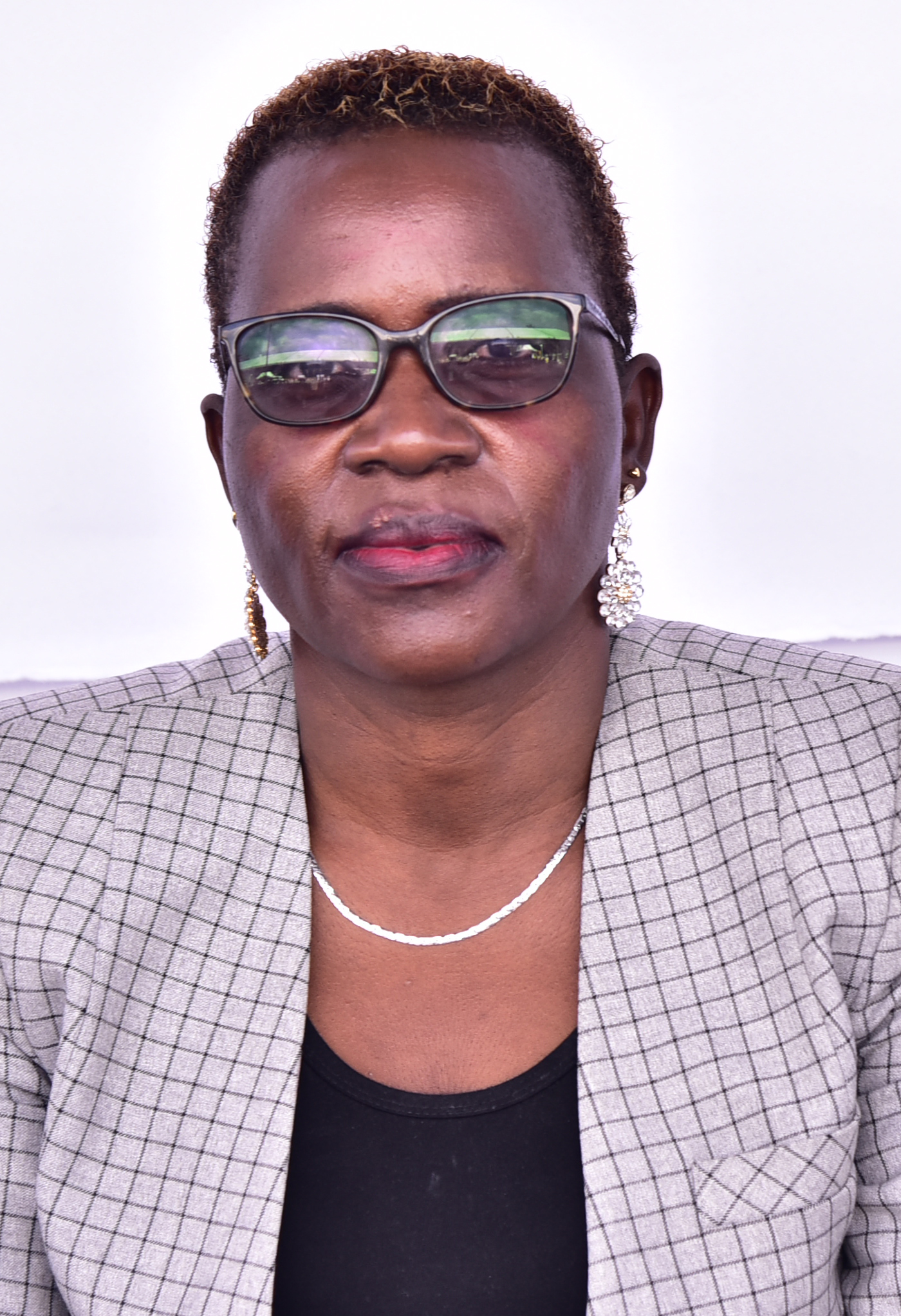
Christine Akello

Christine Akello born as Akello Christine Ogwang Gwok Adako is a Ugandan politician who is a member of Parliament for Erute North, Lira District under the National Resistance Movement in the eleventh Parliament of Uganda.

== Career background ==
Christine serves on the Committee on Agriculture, Animal Industries and Fisheries at the Parliament of Uganda.

In Erute North, during the political campaign, she defeated Charles Angiro Gutumoi under the Forum for Democratic Change (FDC) political party who received 8,625 votes compared to Akello's 13,948 votes. Charles Angiro Gutumoi, who served as the Erute North Member of Parliament in the tenth Parliament of Uganda, died in an accident with three others in Murchison Game Park in 2023. This happened when he was travelling from Lira to Nebbi district to attend a traditional marriage ceremony. In May 2018, he was also involved in a serious accident near Karuma that left him with a broken leg.

== Controversy ==
In 2023, she was alleged for inciting locals to reject the opening of community access roads by Gulsan Construction Company which is constructing the Apac to Lira to Puranga road as part of their corporate social responsibility. She talked about the increased rate of accidents in Kampala because people drive when stressed and tired.

== See also ==
- List of members of the eleventh Parliament of Uganda
