= Jenifer Abaho Muheesi =

Ugandan politician

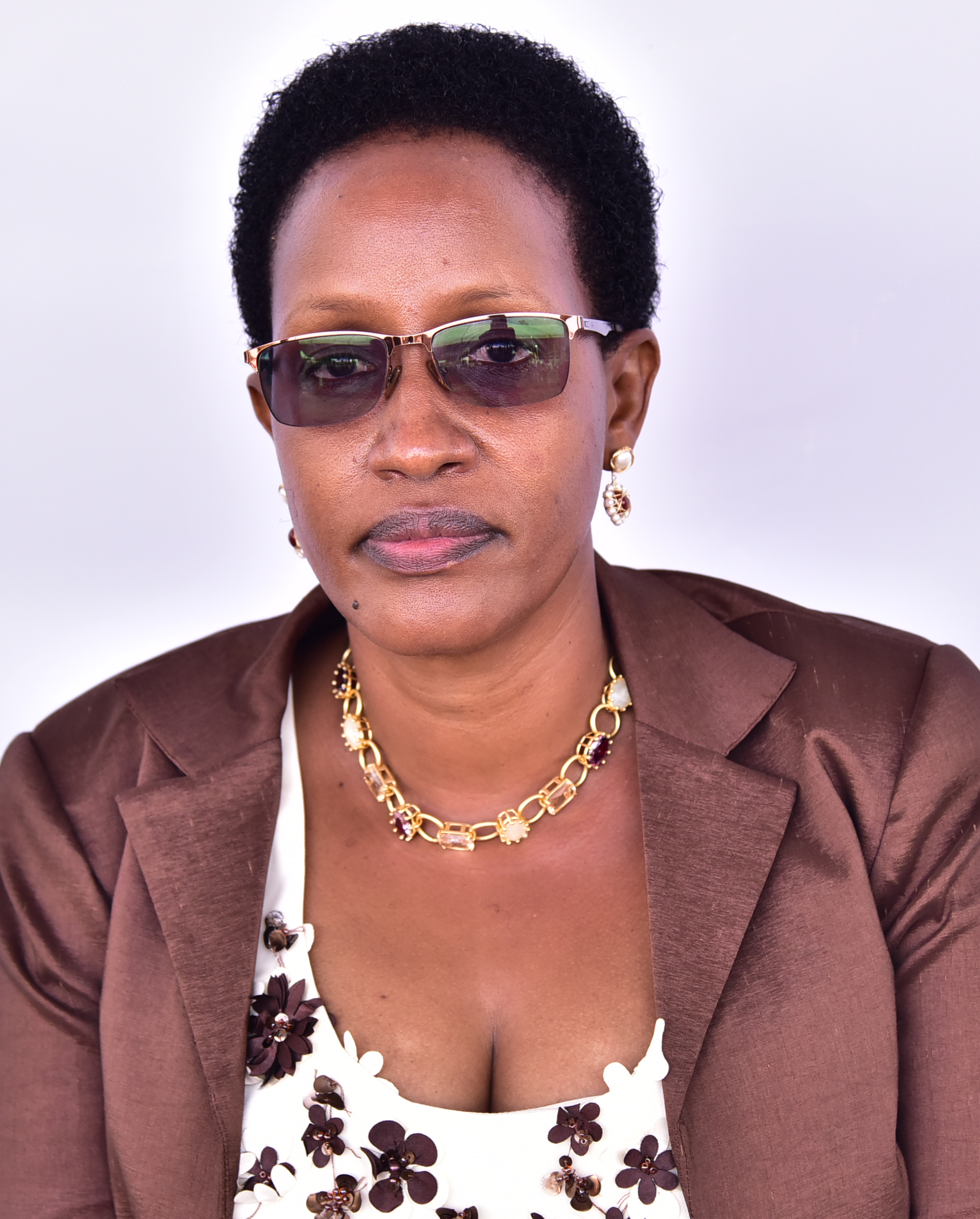

Woman Member of Parliament for Kazo District
- Incumbent
- Assumed office 2021

Personal details
- Party: National Resistance Movement
- Education: Kibura Girls Secondary School
- Occupation: Politician
- Known for: Member of Parliament for Kazo District

Jenifer Abaho Muheesi is a Ugandan women's representative member of parliament for Kazo District under the National Resistance Movement (NRM) in the eleventh Parliament of Uganda.

== Early life and education ==
Jenifer sat her Uganda certificate of Education from Kibura Girls Secondary School.

== Controversies ==
Former State Minister for Economic Monitoring, Molly Kamukama filed a petition blocking the nomination of Jennifer Muheesi as the NRM flag bearer for Kazo District Woman Member of Parliament. That was dismissed by The High Court in Mbarara claiming that the National Resistance Movement primaries were marred with irregularities after Molly was defeated.

== Related links ==
1. Website of the Parliament of Uganda
2. List of members of the eleventh Parliament of Uganda
