= Margret Okunga Makoha =

Woman Member of Parliament for Namayingo District
- Incumbent
- Assumed office 2021

Personal details
- Born: Uganda
- Party: National Resistance Movement (NRM)
- Occupation: Politician
- Known for: First Woman MP for Namayingo District (11th Parliament); NRM political leadership in the newly created district

Margret Okunga Makoha, also known as Margaret Makokha, is a Ugandan politician who became the first woman Member of Parliament of the new Namayingo district in the 2021 general elections under the National Resistance Movement political party.

== See also ==
- List of members of the eleventh Parliament of Uganda
- Namayingo district
- National Resistance Movement
- Member of Parliament
