= Jacinta Athieno Ayo =

Ugandan politician

- Citizenship: Ugandan
- Years active: 2016-2021
- Known for: Politics
- Title: Member of parliament

Jacinta Athieno Ayo is a Ugandan politician and member of the parliament. She was elected as a woman Member of Parliament to represent Tororo district during the 2021 Uganda general elections after defeating Sarah Achieng Opendi.

She contested as an Independent Political member.

== See also ==
- List of members of the eleventh Parliament of Uganda
- Independent Politician
- Sarah Achieng Opendi
- Member of Parliament
- Parliament of Uganda
