= Christine Bukenya Ssendawula =

Ugandan politician

Woman Member of Parliament for Kyankwanzi District
- Constituency: Kyankwanzi District

Personal details
- Party: National Resistance Movement (NRM)

Christine Bukenya Ssendawula is a Ugandan politician and the Kyankwanzi district Woman Member of Parliament (MP) at the eleventh Parliament of Uganda under the National Resistance Movement political party.

== Political career ==
She sits on the Education Committee at the Parliament of Uganda. She was participated in the Civil Society Organizations meeting that led to the call for a review of the provisions in the East African Crude Pipeline Special Provisions bill that limits domestic use of oil and gas produced in Uganda.

== See also ==
- List of members of the eleventh Parliament of Uganda
