= James Dubai Olobo =

James Dubai Olobo (August 29, 1960) is a Ugandan farmer, entrepreneur and politician representing Kioga North, Amolatar District in the eleventh Parliament of Uganda under the National Resistance Movement political party.

== Political history ==
James is the National Resistance Movement political party chairman. During his political terms at the eleventh parliament of Uganda, he advocated for government's localization of Parish Development Model into local languages to enable people understand it better. He has been appoint as the Patriotic League of Uganda (PLU) coordinator in Lango sub region alongside Jane Ruth Aceng. He was convicted of assault based on a case filed by businesswoman, Hellen Rose Abeso who is based in Soroti alleging that she was attacked by the legislator while in her shop in Soroti town in October 2018.

== See also ==
- List of members of the eleventh Parliament of Uganda
