= Jennifer Ayoo =

Ugandan politician

Jennifer Ayoo Nalukwago
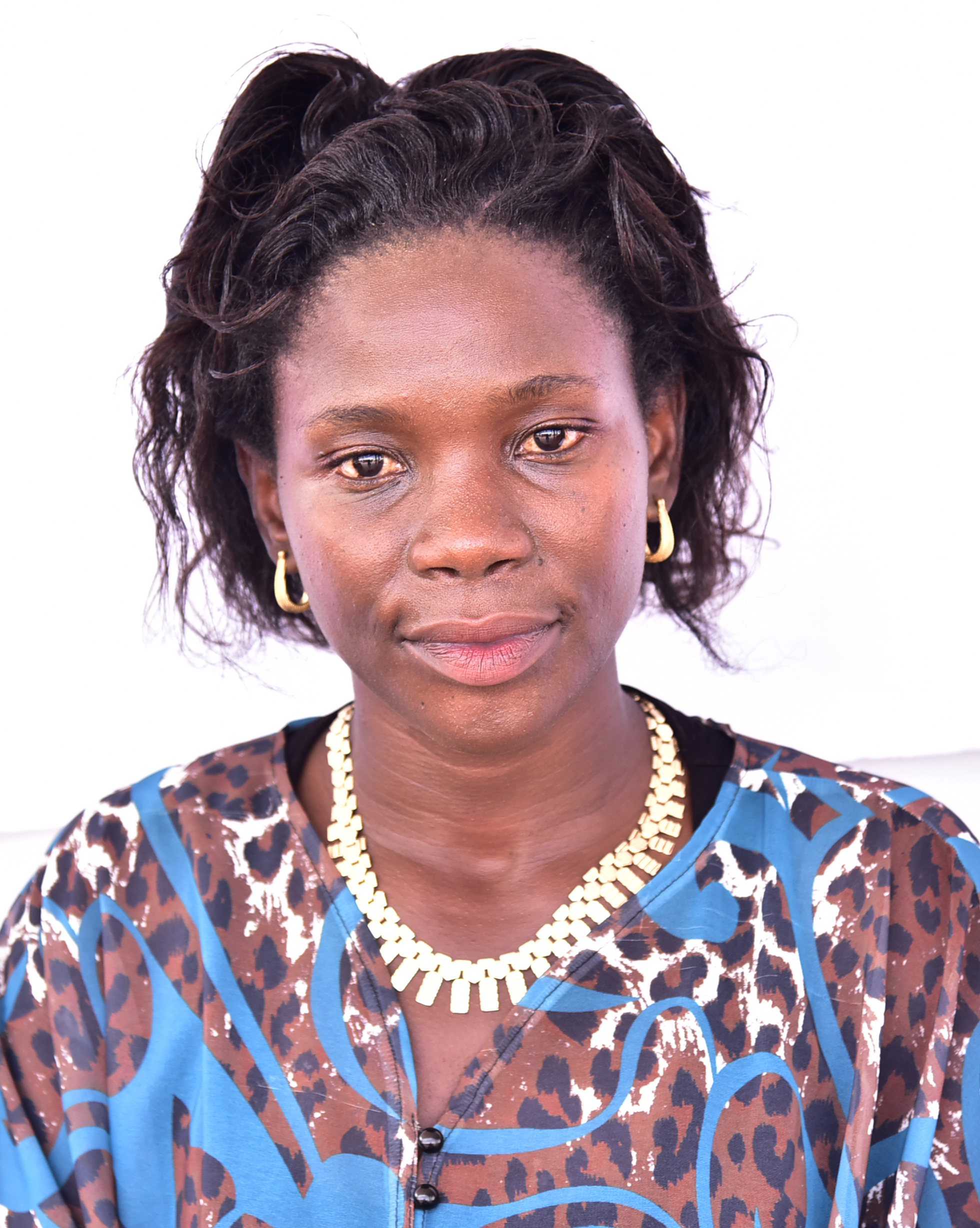

Member of Parliament for Kalaki District
- Incumbent
- Assumed office 2021

Personal details
- Born: Uganda
- Party: National Resistance Movement
- Occupation: Politician
- Known for: Member of Parliament for Kalaki District
- Committees: Chairperson, Kalaki District Road Committee

Jennifer Ayoo Nalukwago is a Ugandan politician and legislator in the eleventh parliament of Uganda serving as the member of parliament for Kalaki District in the Teso Sub-Region of Eastern Uganda. She is a member of the National Resistance Movement.(NRM).

== Political career ==
Ayoo won the National Resistance Movement primaries after defeating Maria Gorretti Ajilo a former member of Parliament for Kaberamaido District. She was then elected as the member of parliament in the 2021 elections. she serves as the chairperson of Kalaki District road committee.

== Other works ==
Ayoo helped in the fight against the further spread of coronavirus in Uganda by donating boxes of Covidex herbal medicine and personal Protective Equipment(PPEs) including Sanitizers and boxes of face masks. Her donation was received by Kalaki District COVID-19 Task Force Committee which was headed by the Resident District Commissioner (RDC), Paul Kalikwani

== See also ==
1. List of members of the eleventh Parliament of Uganda
2. Robinah Nabbanja
3. Parliament of Uganda
4. National Unity Platform
