= Flavia Nabagabe Kalule =

Ugandan politician (born 1985)

Flavia Nabagabe Kalule Honorable
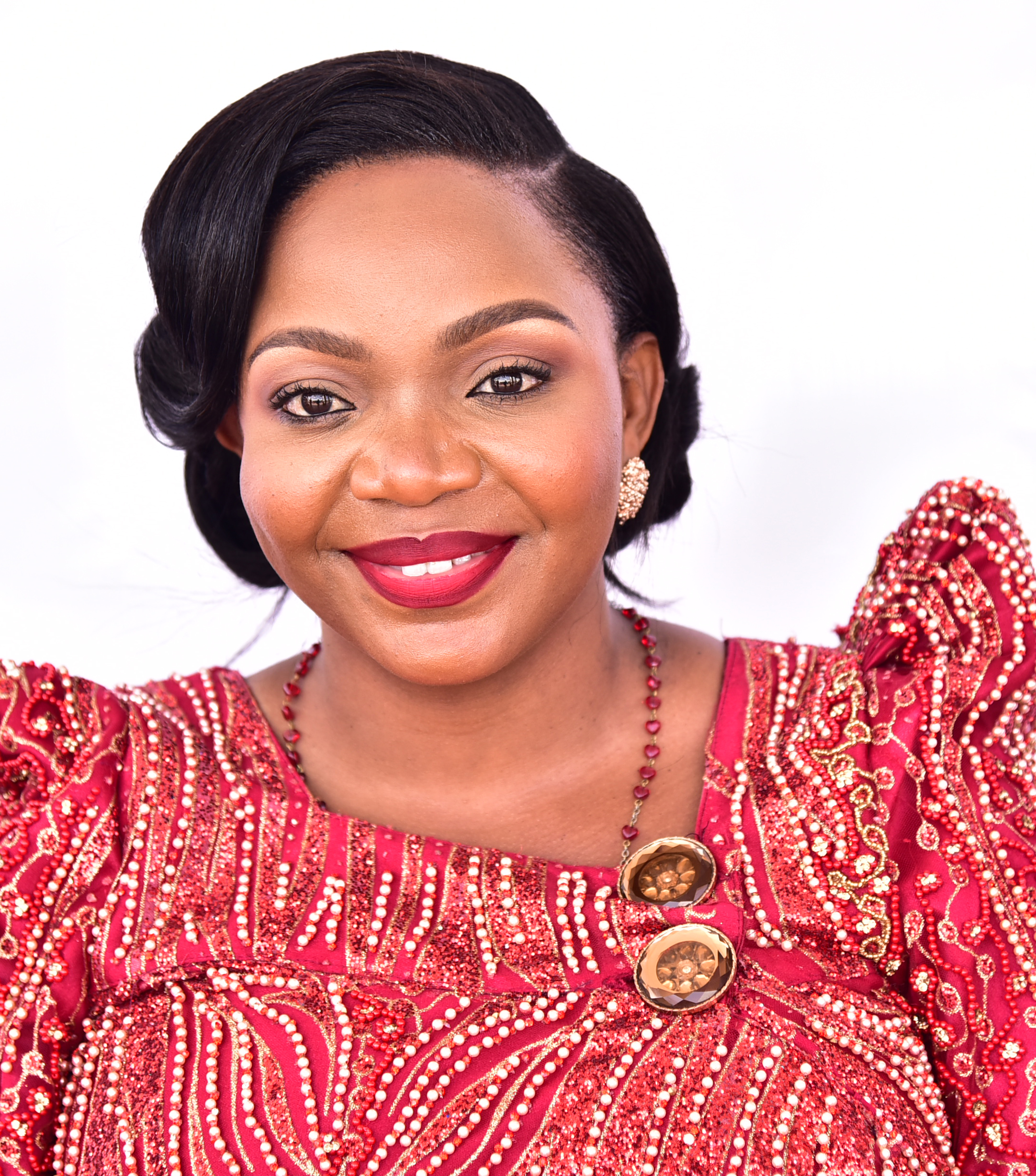
- Kalule in 2021

Woman Member of Parliament for Kasanda District
- Incumbent
- Assumed office 2021

Personal details
- Born: April 22, 1985 Uganda
- Party: National Unity Platform
- Education: Makerere University (Bachelor of Arts with Education, Master of Arts in Human Rights)
- Occupation: Politician, Teacher, Women's Rights Activist

Flavia Nabagabe Kalule (born 22 April 1985) is a Ugandan teacher, Inter-parliamentary Union representative, women's rights activist and woman member of parliament for Kassanda district in the 11th parliament of the Republic of Uganda. She is chairperson of the women’s league at National Unity Platform (NUP) party also known as People Power.

== Early life and education ==
Flavia was born on 22 April 1985 to Lawrence Sserugo Kalule and Florence Nalwanga Kalule, who served as a Resident District Commissioner (RDC) for the Mubende, Kabarole and Nakasongola districts.

Flavia completed her primary level education at St Theresa’s Namagunga Primary Boarding School in 1998. She completed both her Secondary level education from Our Lady of Good Counsel Gayaza in 2004. She later joined Makerere University for Bachelor of Arts with Education and graduated in 2008. In 2013, Flavia enrolled for a Masters in Arts in Human Rights at Makerere University.

In 2016, Flavia attended a leadership training programme in Kenya under the Young African Leaders Initiative (YALI) East African programme. In 2017, Flavia participated in the Mandela Washington Fellowship for Young African Leaders, a flagship programme of the United States (US) government’s YALI where she participated in a leadership training programme, civic engagement and public management.

== Career ==
=== Teaching ===
Flavia taught at Our Lady of Good Counsel in Gayaza. And later joined Namilyango College where she taught from 2008 to 2012.

=== Advocacy work ===
In 2012, Flavia joined Forum for Women in Democracy (FOWODE) as an intern where she was later promoted to the position of Programme Officer.

=== Political career ===
In 2016, Flavia contested and lost the position for Woman MP for Mubende District. In 2021, Flavia contested and won the position for Woman Member of Parliament for Kassanda District under National Unity Platform (NUP). Flavia was appointed as chairperson of the women’s league for NUP, a committee that handles women's leadership and sexual harassment within the NUP political party.

== See also ==
- List of members of the eleventh Parliament of Uganda
- Ruth S Nankabirwa
- Parliament of Uganda
- National Unity Platform
