= Stella Atyang =

Ugandan politician

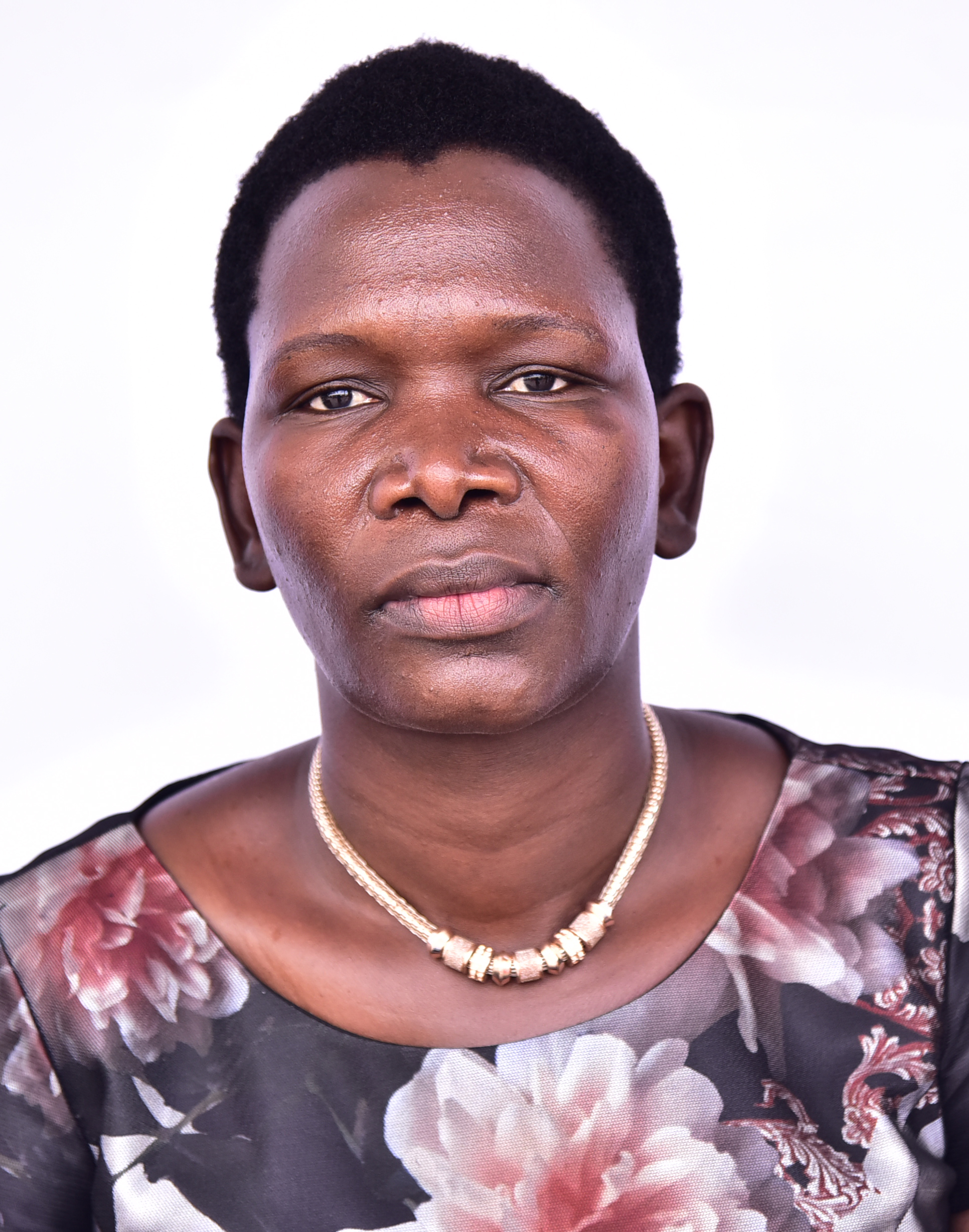

Member of Parliament of Uganda representing Moroto District
- Incumbent
- Assumed office April 26, 2017

Personal details
- Born: Moroto District, Uganda
- Occupation: Politician

Stella Atyang is a Ugandan politician and a District Woman representing Moroto in the Ugandan parliament. She was elected on April 26, 2017, on the ticket of National Resistance Movement to replace her niece, Annie Logiel the Woman MP representing Moroto before her death. Atyang was a lone candidate in the election after opposition parties declined to feature candidates fearing that the district would give her sympathy vote in honour of her deceased Aunty. She was declared elected unopposed.

Atyang is an ex officio member of the Karamoja Peace And Technology University (KAPATU) Project University Council.
