= Arthur Waako Mboizi =

Ugandan politician

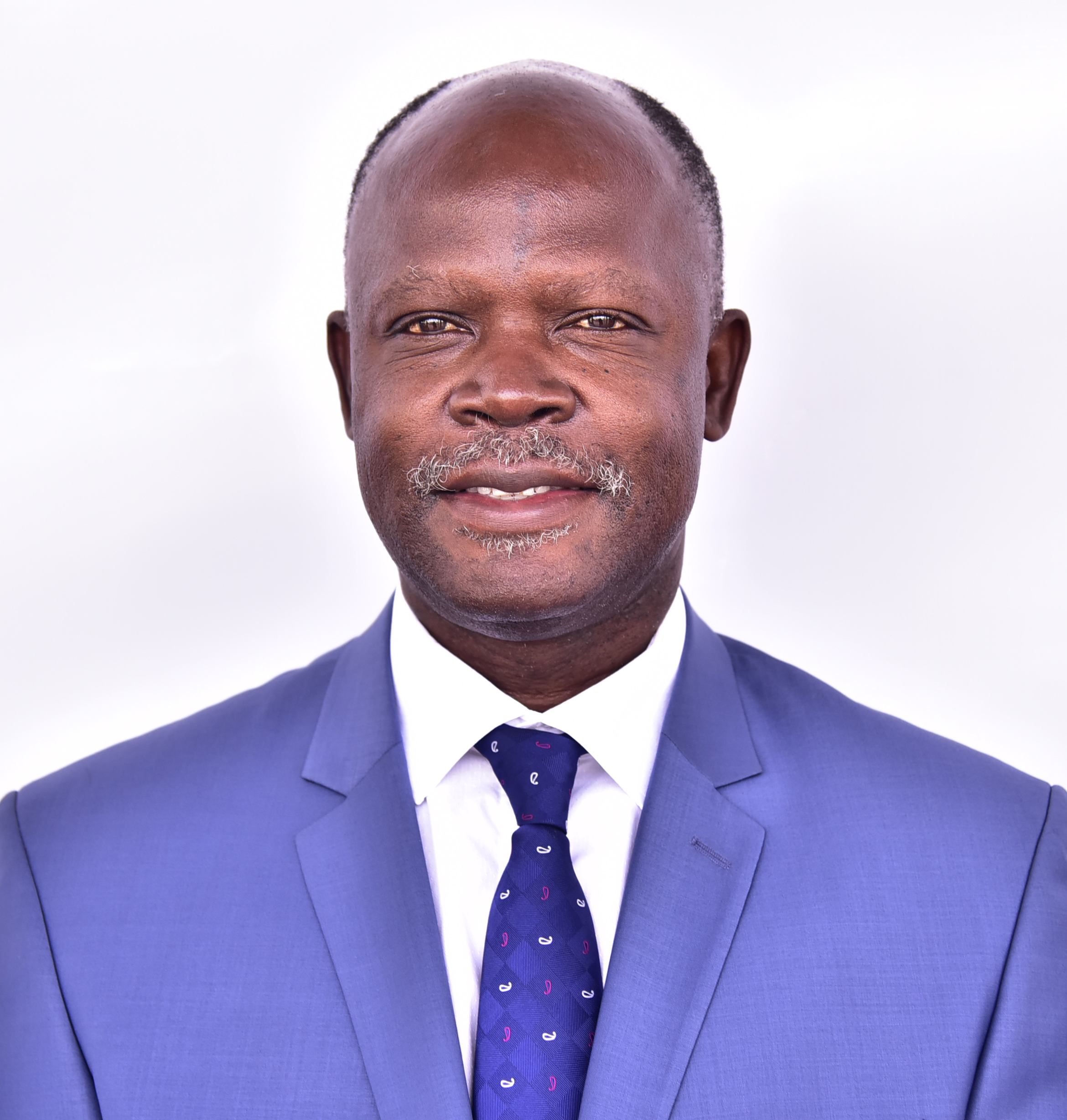

Member of Ugandan Parliament from Budaka County
- Incumbent
- Assumed office 2021
- Preceded by: Kezekia Mbogo

Personal details
- Party: Independent

Arthur Waako Mboizi, known by his sobriquet Katalo, is a Ugandan politician and a member of the parliament representing Budaka County, Budaka District. He was elected to the Parliament of Uganda as an independent candidate in 2021. In the parliament of Uganda, he serves on the Committee on Gender, Labour and Social Development.

== Career ==
Mboizi began his political career as LC 1 and LC3 district councillor before being elected Chairperson of Budaka District Council. In 2016, he ran for Budaka LC5 seat but was defeated by Sam Mulomi. Mboizi was the district chairperson of National Resistance Movement political party for 15 years. In 2020, he ran as an independent candidate for the Budaka seat in the parliament campaigning for improvement of agriculture, educational system and balance trade. He won in the general election defeating incumbent Kezekia Mbogo.
