= Linos Ngompek =

Ugandan politician

Member of Parliament
- Incumbent
- Assumed office 17 May 2021
- Preceded by: Taban Amin
- Constituency: Kibanda North

Member of Parliament for Kibanda North County

Personal details
- Born: 19 August 1977 (age 48)
- Party: National Resistance Movement
- Education: Makerere University (Bachelor Degree in Environmental Conservation Science)

Linos Ngompek (born 19 August 1977) is a Ugandan politician, environmentalist and currently member of Parliament for Kibanda North County in Kiryandongo District in the eleventh parliament under National Resistance Movement party, serving as vice chairperson of the Defense and Internal Affairs Committee.

== Early life and education ==
Ngompek was born on 19 August 1977 in Pakwach district. His parents and the siblings migrated to Kiryandongo district in the late 1980s.He attended his primary education at Bunyoro Catholic School and Makerere university for his higher education, he graduated with a bachelor's degree in Environmental Conservation science in 2003.

== Career ==
In 2003, Ngompek worked as a teacher at Bishop Cyprian Kihangire in Luzira, Uganda.He served as RDC before becoming a member of Parliament when he defeated Taban Amin the grandson of former Uganda president Idi Amin Dada with 10,710 votes.

Ngompek was appointed the Masaka district Resident District Commissioner in February 2014 He served as the RDC for Kiryandongo in the same year. Ngompek served as the Resident District Commissioner of Agago District before serving as the Kiryandongo district security committee chairperson by 2021. He runs the Ngompek Foundation that helps children access quality education.

== Awards and recognitions ==
In the Inter-Parliamentary Games of East African community, Ngompek was awarded the Golden Glove award for the best goalkeeper.

== See also ==
- Parliament of Uganda
