= Barnabas Tinkasimire =

Ugandan politician

Member of Parliament for Buyaga West County
- In office May 2006 – May 2026
- Preceded by: Ignatius Besisira
- Succeeded by: Dennis Namara
- Constituency: Buyaga West County (Kagadi District)

Personal details
- Born: Barnabas Tinkasimire Uganda
- Citizenship: Ugandan
- Party: National Resistance Movement (2006–2019, 2020–2025); Independent (2025–2026)
- Spouse(s): Agnes Ageno Tinkasimire (died 2018); Sandrah Tinkasimire (m. 2015)
- Occupation: Politician
- Profession: Public Servant

Barnabas Tinkasimire is a Ugandan politician and a former Member of the Ugandan Parliament elected from the Buyaga West constituency, Kagadi District on the ticket of the National Resistance Movement (NRM). He was the Chairman for the Bunyoro Parliamentary Caucus.

== Personal life ==
Tinkasimire was married to Agnes Ageno Tinkasimire, who died in 2012 following multiple injuries sustained in an arson attack on Tinkasimire’s house by unidentified persons. He later married Sandrah Tinkasimire in 2015.

However, his date of birth is not specified clearly in his biography.

== Political career ==
Tinkasimire was first elected in 2006 from then-Buyaga constituency, now Kibaale District, on the NRM ticket. In 2017, Tinkasimire was one of 29 MPs labeled “rebel MPs" by his party for his opposition against the removal of the age limit for presidential candidates, which would allow President Yoweri Museveni to remain in office beyond 75 years age limit. He subsequently left the party and joined People Power, Our Power, serving as the appointed coordinator for Bunyoro sub-region. He left People Power and returned to his former party after meeting with President Museveni along with 16 other “rebel MPs” in the build up to the 2021 general election. After his return to NRM, he tagged the People Power as “a political club” during an interview with NBS TV Morning Breeze Show. He lost his MP seat in the 2026 elections.
