= Yusuf Mutembuli =

Ugandan politicians

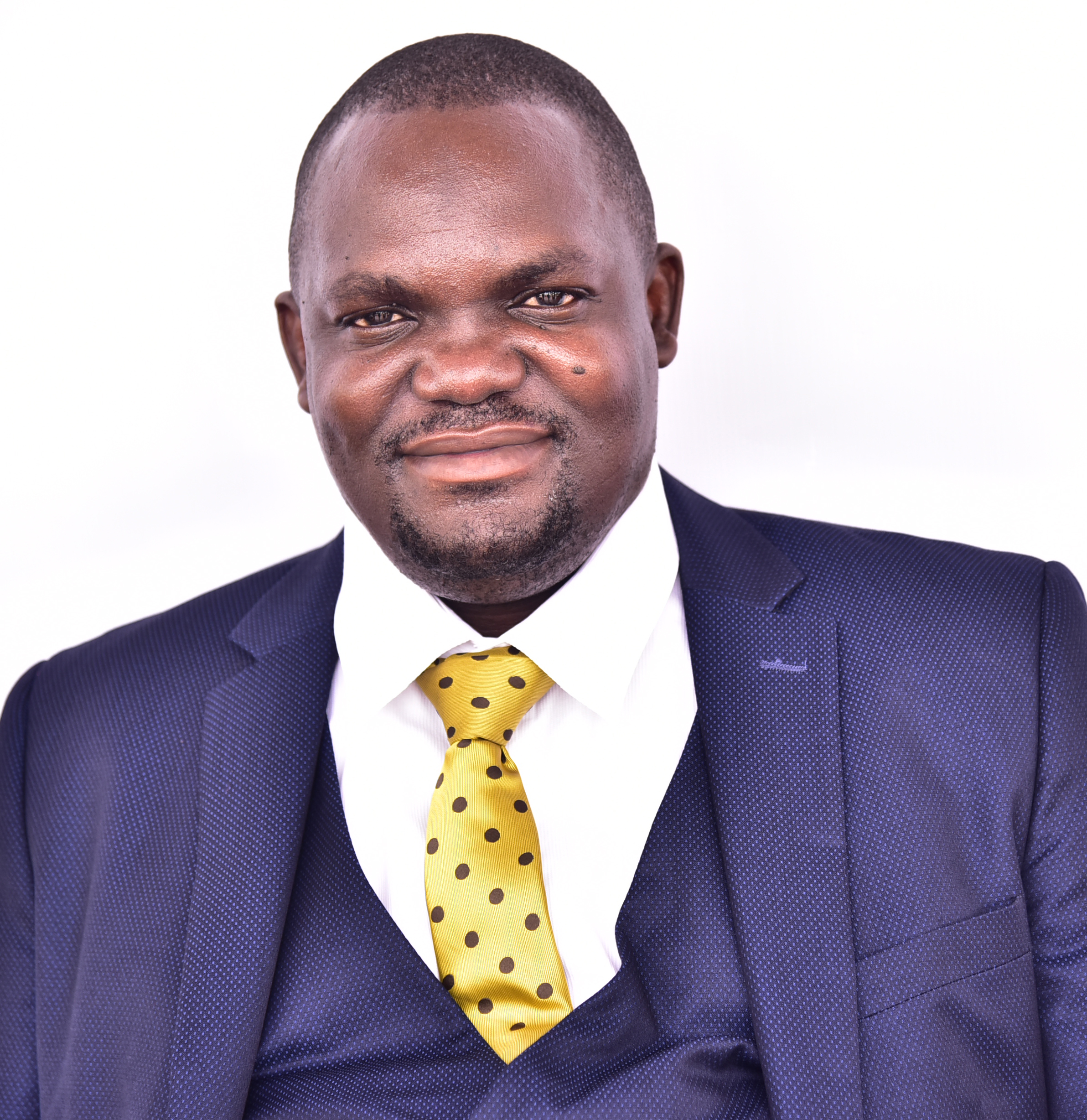

Former Member of Parliament of Uganda for Bunyole East
- In office 2021 – May 2026
- Preceded by: Nagomu Musamba Moses
- Succeeded by: Ronald Mutengo Hanghuja

Personal details
- Party: Independent (2026); NRM (2020–2026); Democratic Party (before 2020)

Yusuf Mutembuli is a Ugandan advocate of the High Court, academic, politician and Member of Parliament representing Butaleja District in Bunyole East constituency on the National Resistance Movement (NRM) ticket.

He served as the Vice-chairperson on the Committee on Legal and Parliamentary Affairs of the 11th parliament.

== Political career ==
Mutembuli contested in the 2016 general election on the Democratic Party (DP) ticket, but lost to Nagomu Musamba Moses of NRM. Mutembuli served as Democratic Party Vice President and People Power Coordinator of Eastern Region. He defected to the ruling NRM party in the build up to the 2021 general election after 15 years in DP criticizing it as lacking political agenda and said the party is 50 years away from taking presidential power. He was elected to parliament on the NRM ticket in the 2021 election.

== See also ==
- Parliament of Uganda
- Member of Parliament
- National Resistance Movement
