= Geoffrey Feta =

Ugandan politician

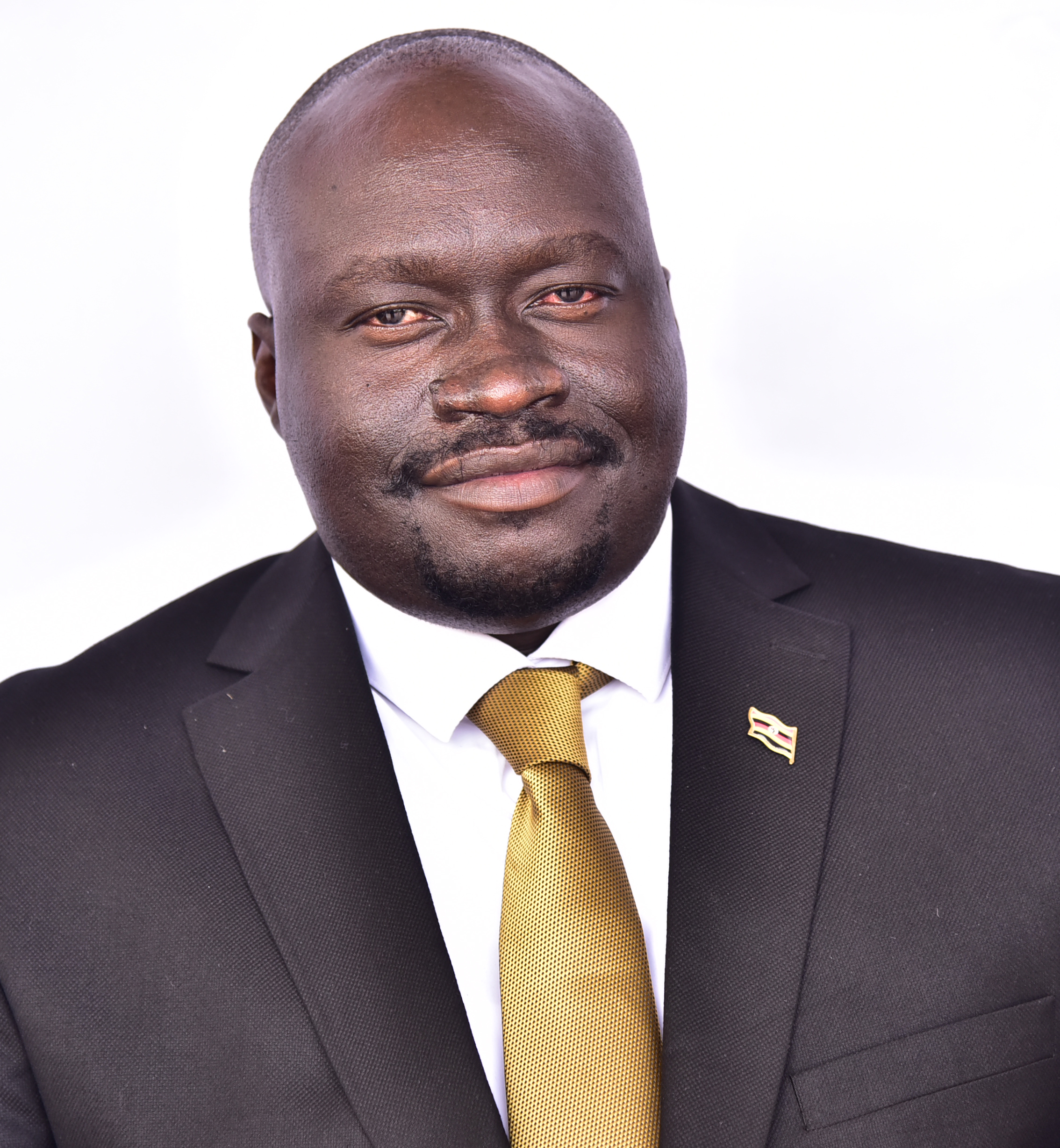

Member of 11th Parliament of Uganda
- In office 2021–2026
- Constituency: Ayivu East

Personal details
- Party: National Resistance Movement (NRM)

Geoffrey Feta is a Ugandan politician of the National Resistance Movement political party currently representing Ayivu East in the 11th Ugandan parliament.

In the 11th parliament Feta serves on the Committee on Information, Communication Technology and National Guidance.
