= Josyline Kamateneti =

Ugandan Legislator

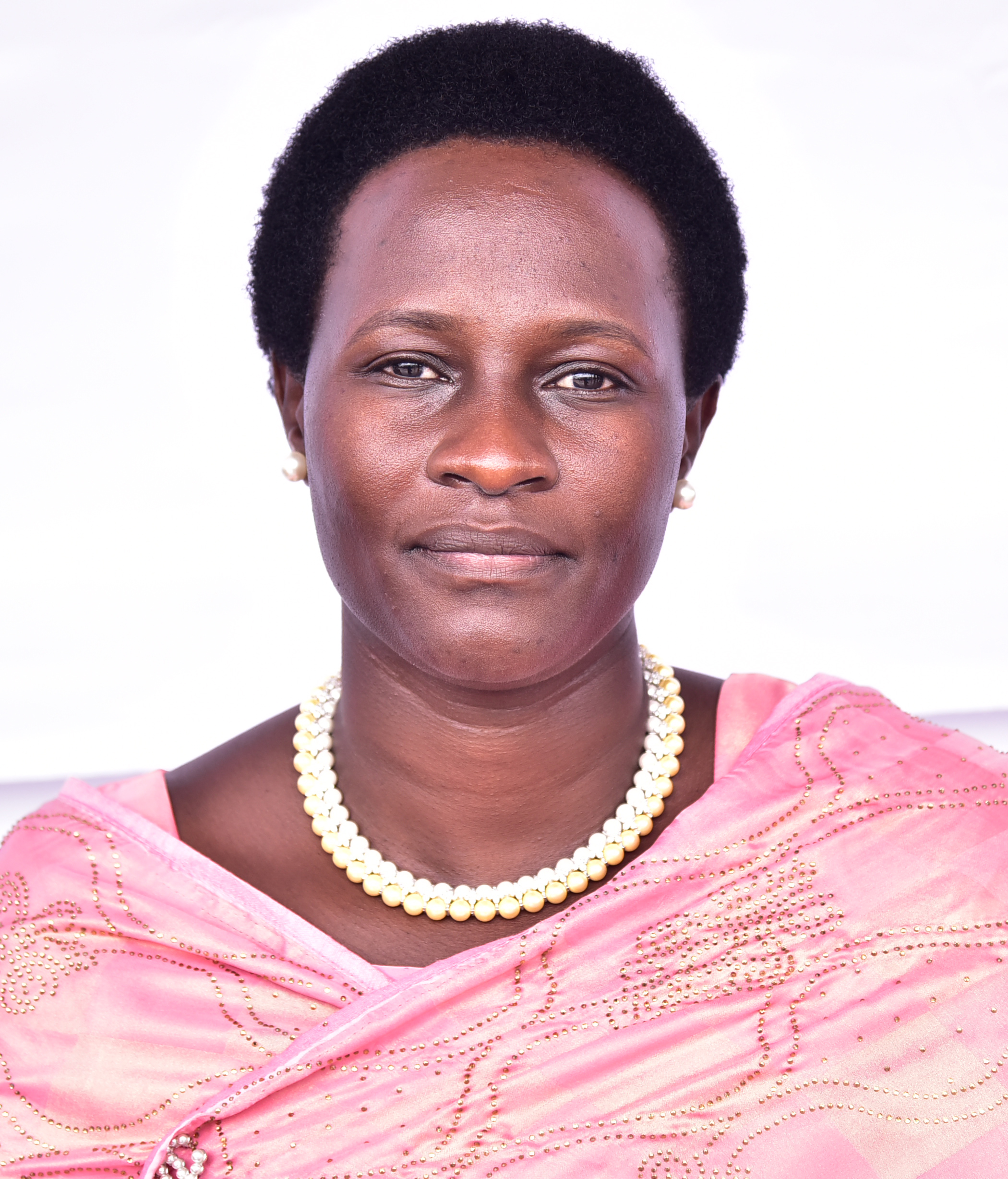
- Born: 16 April 1982 (age 44); Nyabushenyi Village, Nyabushenyi Sub-county, Ntungamo District, Uganda
- Citizenship: Uganda
- Education: Nyakisa Primary School; Horny High School, Kabale; Immaculate Heart Nyakibare Girls' Secondary School
- Alma mater: Makerere University
- Occupations: Politician, accountant
- Years active: 2021–present
- Employer(s): Crane Bank; Bank of Uganda
- Known for: Woman Member of Parliament for Ntungamo District
- Political party: National Resistance Movement
- Spouse: Sande Baata-Kaketto
- Children: 4
- Parent(s): Tadeo Kanyankore-Kakiga and Norah Twinomugisha

Josyline Kamateneti is a Ugandan politician and legislator. She is a woman MP under National Resistance Movement for Ntungamo district. She is also a member of the education and sports committee.

== Early life and education ==
Josyline was born on 16 April 1982 in Nyabushenyi village, Nyabushenyi sub-county, Ntungamo district to late Tadeo Kanyankore - Kakiga and Norah Twinomugisha.

Josyline had her primary education at Nyakisa Primary School, Horny High School - Kabale and Immaculate Heart Nyakibare Girls' Secondary School for her O' level and A' level secondary education respectively. She graduated from Makerere University with a bachelor's degree in Commerce specializing in Finance.

Josyline worked with Crane Bank and moved to Bank of Uganda where she served as an accountant.

== Political background ==
Josyline Kamateneti contested for the seat of woman MP for Ntungamo district and came in the first position with 156022 votes, Natherine Matsiko Namara came second with 9175 votes, Deborah Namara came in the third position with 4789 votes and Sayuni Crinimh came in the fourth position with 4641 votes.

== Personal life ==
Josyline is married to Sande Baata-Kaketto and having 4 children.
