= List of members of the twelfth Parliament of Uganda =

This is a list of members elected to the twelfth Parliament of Uganda (2026 to present) in the 2026 Ugandan general election. It was preceded by the eleventh Parliament (2021 to 2026).

== List ==
The following candidates were elected:

| Name | Party | Constituency | District |
|---|---|---|---|
| Aayoo Joyce Makamoe | National Resistance Movement | District Woman Representative | Abim District |
| Jesca Ababiku | National Resistance Movement | District Woman Representative | Adjumani District |
| James Mamawi | National Resistance Movement | Adjumani East | Adjumani District |
| Moses Ali | National Resistance Movement | Adjumani West | Adjumani District |
| Makmot Otto | National Resistance Movement | Agago county | Agago District |
| Benson Lugwar | INDEP | Agago North | Agago District |
| Ricky Richard Anywar | National Resistance Movement | Agago West | Agago District |
| Beatrice Akello Akori | National Resistance Movement | District Woman Representative | Agago District |
| Fred Jalameso | Uganda People's Congress | Ajuri County | Alebtong District |
| Lakica Mercy | National Resistance Movement | District Woman Representative | Alebtong District |
| Janet Auma Okao | Uganda People's Congress | District Woman Representative | Amolatar District |
| Colline Angwech | Uganda People's Congress | Kioga County | Amolatar District |
| Geoffrey Ocen | Uganda People's Congress | Kioga North | Amolatar District |
| Samuel Ediau | National Resistance Movement | Amuria | Amuria District |
| Gen. Jeje Odongo | INDEP | Amuria | Amuria District |
| Anthony Akol | Forum for Democratic Change | Kilak North | Amuru District |
| Lucy Akello | National Resistance Movement | District Woman Representative | Amuru District |
| Gilbert Olanya | | Kilak South | Amuru District |
| Patrick Ocan | INDEP | Apac Municipality | Apac District |
| Peter Obong Acuda | Uganda People's Congress | Maruzi County | Apac District |
| Otim Odoc | National Resistance Movement | Maruzi North | Apac District |
| Betty Engola | National Resistance Movement | District Woman Representative | Apac District |
| Khemis Mzaid | Forum for Democratic Change | Arua Central | Arua City |
| Charity Lenia | National Resistance Movement | Vurra County | Arua District |
| Lillian Paparu Obiale | National Resistance Movement | Women's Representative | Arua City |
| Tiyo William | National Resistance Movement | Ayiivu East | Arua City |
| Phiona Oriziru | National Resistance Movement | Ayiivu West | Arua City |
| Isaac Modoi | National Resistance Movement | Lutsheshe | Bududa District |
| John Baptist Nambeshe | National Unity Platform | Manjiya | Bududa District |
| WABUSANI STEVEN MAKWA | National Resistance Movement | Bukyigai | Bududa District |
| Agnes Shiuma | National Resistance Movement | District Woman Representative | Bududa District |
| David Becham Okweere | National Resistance Movement | Bukedea | Bukedea District |
| Opolot Isiagi Patrick | National Resistance Movement | Kachumbala | Bukedea District |
| Anita Annet Among | National Resistance Movement | District Woman Representative | Bukedea District |
| Solomon Osiiya | National Resistance Movement | Toroma County | Bukedea District |
| Josephine Ibaseret | National Resistance Movement | Agule | Pallisa District |
| Christopher Komakech | National Resistance Movement | Aruu | Pader District |
| Santa Okot | National Resistance Movement | Aruu North | Pader District |
| Lowila CD Oketayot | National Resistance Movement | District Woman Representative | Pader District |
| Robert Ssekitoleko | National Unity Platform | Bamunanika | Luwero District |
| Denis Sekabira | National Unity Platform | Katikamu North | Luwero District |
| Kirumira Hassan Lukalidde | National Unity Platform | Katikamu South | Luwero District |
| Brenda Nabukenya | National Unity Platform | District Woman Representative | Luwero District |
| Charles Tebandeke | National Unity Platform | Bbaale County | Kayunga District |
| Ilukol Emmanuel | INDEP | Bokora County | Napak District |
| Lochap Peterkhen | National Resistance Movement | Bokora East | Napak District |
| Musila John | National Resistance Movement | Bubulo County East | Namisindwa District |
| Matembu Chris Wataka | INDEP | Bubulo County West | Namisindwa District |
| Nakiyi Julius Muntu | National Resistance Movement | Budadiri CountyEast | Sironko District |
| Wanyoto Godfrey | INDEP | Budadiri County West | Sironko District |
| Eng. Moses Magogo | National Resistance Movement | Budiope East | Buyende District |
| Milly Babalanda | National Resistance Movement | Budiope West | Buyende District |
| Ssebugga Kimeze | National Resistance Movement | Budyebo county | Nakasongola District |
| Ivan Kyeyune | National Unity Platform | Nakasongola county | Nakasongola District |
| Victoria Zawedde | National Resistance Movement | District Woman Representative | Nakasongola District |
| Rebecca Kadaga | National Resistance Movement | District Woman Representative | Kamuli District |
| Namatovu Mastula | National Resistance Movement | Kamuli Municipality | Kamuli District |
| Mugabi Muzaale Martin Kisuule | National Resistance Movement | Buzaaya County | Kamuli District |
| John Teira | National Resistance Movement | Bugabula North | Kamuli District |
| Bazaanya Matayo | National Resistance Movement | Bugabula South | Kamuli District |
| Robinah Nabbanja | National Resistance Movement | District Woman Representative | Kakumiro District |
| Christopher Kibazanga | National Resistance Movement | Bughendera County | Bundibugyo District |
| Ntabazi Harriet | National Resistance Movement | Bwamba County | Bundibugyo District |
| Babungi Josephine Bebona | National Resistance Movement | District Woman Representative | Bundibugyo District |
| Onesimus Twinamasiko | National Resistance Movement | Bugangaizi East | Kakumiro District |
| George Willy Lubega | National Resistance Movement | Bugangaizi South | Kakumiro District |
| Fred Byamukama | National Resistance Movement | Bugangaizi West | Kakumiro District |
| Nankwanga Stellamaris | INDEP | District Woman Representative | Bugweri District |
| Wandera Sadala | National Resistance Movement | Bugweri County | Bugweri District |
| Natumanya Flora | National Resistance Movement | District Woman Representative | Kikuube District |
| Aseera Stephen | National Resistance Movement | Buhaguzi East | Kikuube District |
| Twinomujuni FranciS Kazini | National Resistance Movement | Buhaguzi County | Kikuube District |
| Zadock Mutekanga | National Resistance Movement | Buhweju | Buhweju District |
| Eng. Dr. John Bosco Koy Kariisa | National Resistance Movement | Buhweju West | Buhweju District |
| Annet Nnamara | National Resistance Movement | District Woman Representative | Buhweju District |
| Kiiza Kenneth Nyendwoha | National Resistance Movement | Bujenje County | Masindi District |
| Akugizibwe Aled Ronald | National Resistance Movement | Buruli | Masindi District |
| Byamukama Rogers | National Resistance Movement | Masindi Municipality | Masindi District |
| Asiimwe Florence Akiiki | National Resistance Movement | District Woman Representative | Masindi District |
| Lugoloobi Willy Bageyente | National Resistance Movement | Bujumba County | Kalangala District |
| Birungi Carolyn Nanyondo | National Resistance Movement | Kyamuswa | Kalangala District |
| Aidah Nabiyiga | National Unity Platform | District Woman Representative | Kalangala District |
| Mutebi Benard Mugoya | National Resistance Movement | Bulamogi County | Kaliro District |
| Kasajja George Patrick | National Resistance Movement | Bulamogi North West | Kaliro District |
| Brenda Namukuta | NRM | District Woman Representative | Kaliro District |
| Okeyoh Peter | National Resistance Movement | Bukholi Islands | Namayingo District |
| Adidwa Abdu | INDEP | Bukholi South | Namayingo District |
| Ouma Willy | National Resistance Movement | Namayingo South | Namayingo District |
| Mukisa Robina Hope | National Resistance Movement | District Woman Representative | Namayingo District |
| Namatende Eunice | National Resistance Movement | District Woman Representative | Bugiri District |
| John Francis Oketcho | National Resistance Movement | Bugiri Municipality | Bugiri District |
| Silwanyi Solomon | National Resistance Movement | Bukhooli Central | Bugiri District |
| Jamal Ayagalaki Mukuve | National Unity Platform | Bukhooli North | Bugiri District |
| Jimmy Kanaabi | National Unity Platform | Buikwe South | Buikwe District |
| Musanje Moses Lukanga | National Unity Platform | Njeru Municipality | Buikwe District |
| Mutasingwa Diana Nankunda | National Resistance Movement | District Woman Representative | Buikwe District |
| SSERUNJOGI HASSAN MUKIIBI | National Resistance Movement | Bukomansimbi South | Bukomansimbi District |
| KISEKKA SALIM | National Resistance Movement | Bukomansimbi North | Bukomansimbi District |
| KATUSHABE RUTH | National Resistance Movement | District Woman Representative | Bukomansimbi District |
| Monday Julius Rude | National Resistance Movement | Bukonzo East | Kasese District |
| Chrispus Kiyonga | National Resistance Movement | Bukonzo West | Kasese District |
| Sowedi Kitanywa | National Resistance Movement | Busongora North | Kasese District |
| David Isimbwa Mulindwa | National Resistance Movement | Busongora South | Kasese District |
| Kambale Ferigo | National Resistance Movement | Kasese Municipality | Kasese District |
| Sarah Ithungu Masereka | National Resistance Movement | District Woman Representative | Kasese District |
| Patrick Kuteesa | National Unity Platform | Kimanya-Kabonera | Masaka City |
| Lubowa Ssebina Gyaviira | National Unity Platform | Nyendo/Mukungwe | Masaka City |
| Justine Nameere | National Resistance Movement | City Woman Representative | Masaka City |
| Joan Namutaawe | National Unity Platform | District Woman Representative | Masaka district |
| Ssebamala Richard | Democratic Party Uganda | Bukoto Central | Masaka District |
| Kityo Sarah | National Resistance Movement | Bukoto East | Masaka District |
| Kiyimba Emmanuel | National Resistance Movement | Bukoto Mid-West | Lwengo District |
| Hakim Kizza Sawula | National Unity Platform | Bukoto South | Lwengo District |
| SSENTAYI MUHAMAD | National Resistance Movement | Bukoto West | Lwengo District |
| Cissy Dionizia Namujju | National Resistance Movement | District Woman Representative | Lwengo District |
| Kyabikoola Yiga | National Resistance Movement | Bukuya | Kassanda District |
| Patrick Nsamba Oshabe | National Unity Platform | Kassanda North | Kassanda District |
| Bisaso Abdul | National Resistance Movement | Kassanda South | Kassanda District |
| Atukunda Rebecca | National Resistance Movement | District Woman Representative | Kassanda District |
| Biara Emmanuel Wepukhulu | National Resistance Movement | Bulambuli county | Bulambuli District |
| Inyasio Mudimi | IND | Elgon County | Bulambuli District |
| Gerald Nangoli | National Resistance Movement | Elgon North | Bulambuli District |
| Sarah Namboozo Wekomba | National Resistance Movement | District Woman Representative | Bulambuli District |
| Karim Masaba | IND | Industrial City Division | Mbale City |
| Umar Nangoli | IND | Northern Division | Mbale City |
| Lydia Wanyoto Mutende | National Resistance Movement | District Woman Representative | Mbale City |
| Masaba Charles Mutenyo | National Resistance Movement | Bungokho Central | Mbale District |
| Wanyenya Shafiga | National Resistance Movement | Bungokho North | Mbale District |
| George Wokuri | National Resistance Movement | Bungokho South | Mbale District |
| Miriam Mukhaye | National Resistance Movement | District Woman Representative | Mbale District |
| | | Bunyangabu | Bunyangabu District |
| | | Bunyaruguru | Rubirizi District |
| Mutego Ronald Hanghujja | Independent | Bunyole East | Butaleja District |
| | | Bunyole West | Butaleja District |
| | | Bushenyi-Ishaka Municipality | Bushenyi District |
| | | Busia Municipality | Busia District |
| David Kalwanga Lukyamuzi | National Unity Platform | Busujju | Mityana District |
| Francis Zaake | National Unity Platform | Mityana Municipality | Mityana District |
| Muhammad Nsegumire Kibedi | National Resistance Movement | Mityana North | Mityana District |
| Kamya Makumbi | National Resistance Movement | Mityana South | Mityana District |
| Judith Nabakooba | National Resistance Movement | District Woman Representative | Mityana District |
| Eriasa Mukiibi Sserunjoji | INDEP | Butambala | Butambala District |
| Lydia Mirembe Delphine | INDEP | District Woman Representative | Butambala District |
| | | Butebo | Butebo District |
| | | Butemba | Kyankwanzi District |
| | | Ntwetwe | Kyankwanzi District |
| | | District Woman Representative | Kyankwanzi District |
| | | Butiru | Manafwa District |
| | | Buvuma | Buvuma District |
| | | Buwekula | Mubende District |
| Dedan Mubangizi | National Resistance Movement | Buwekula South | Mubende District |
| Ronald Muhenda | INDEP | Central Division | Fort Portal City |
| Irene Linda | National Resistance Movement | City Woman MP | Fort Portal City |
| Margaret Anne Muhanga Mugisha | National Resistance Movement | North Division | Fort Portal City |
| | | Chekwii | Nakapiripirit District |
| | | Chekwii East | Nakapiripirit District |
| | | District Woman Representative | Nakapiripirit District |
| John Calvin Okoya | | Chua East | Kitgum District |
| Simon Peter Oryema Adum | National Resistance Movement | Chua West | Kitgum District |
| Denis Onekalit Amere | Forum for Democratic Change | Kitgum Municipality | Kitgum District |
| Lillian Aber | National Resistance Movement | District Woman Representative | Kitgum District |
| | | Dakabela | Soroti District |
| | | Dodoth East | Kaabong District |
| | | Dodoth North | Kaabong District |
| | | Ik | Kaabong District |
| | | District Woman Representative | Kaabong District |
| | | Dodoth West | Karenga District |
| Joseph Ogwal Jones | National Resistance Movement | Dokolo North | Dokolo District |
| Vincent Opito | Uganda People's Congress | Dokolo South | Dokolo District |
| Sarah Aguti Nyangkori | Uganda People's Congress | District Woman Representative | Dokolo District |
| | | Elgon | Bulambuli District |
| | | Elgon North | Bulambuli District |
| | | Entebbe Municipality | Wakiso District |
| Alyela Denis Omodi | National Resistance Movement | Lira City East | Lira City |
| Vincent Shedrick Obong (Ebong Eyit) | Uganda People's Congress | Lira City West | Lira City |
| Jane Ruth Aceng Ocero | National Resistance Movement | Woman MP Lira city. | Lira City |
| Ongom Patrick Aregedeng | National Resistance Movement | Erute North | Lira District |
| Engola Sam | National Resistance Movement | Erute South | Lira District |
| Linda Agnes Auma | National Resistance Movement | District Woman Representative | Lira District |
| Orone Derrick | National Resistance Movement | Gogonyo | Pallisa District |
| Constantine Okwii | National Resistance Movement | Kibale county | Pallisa District |
| IBRAHIM IBRAHIM AISU | National Resistance Movement | Pallisa County | Pallisa District |
| IBASERET JOSEPHINE NKIBS | National Resistance Movement | Agule County | Pallisa District |
| ACHOLA CATHERINE | National Resistance Movement | District Woman Representative | Pallisa District |
| Godfrey Ssazi | National Unity Platform | Gomba East | Gomba District |
| Sylvia Nayebale | National Resistance Movement | District Woman Representative | Gomba District |
| Robinah Rwakojo | National Resistance Movement | Gomba West | Gomba District |
| | | Gulu East | Gulu City |
| Norbert Mao | Democratic Party Uganda | Laroo–Pece Division | Gulu City |
| | | Gulu West | Gulu City |
| Betty Aol Ocan | People's Front for Freedom | City Woman MP | Gulu City |
| Patrick Okello Onguti | National Unity Platform | Aswa | Gulu District |
| Jenet Ayoo Phoebe | Democratic Party Uganda | District Woman Representative | Gulu District |
| Patrick Mwesigwa Isingoma | INDEP | Hoima East Division | Hoima City |
| Ismeal Kasule | Alliance for National Transformation | Hoima West Division | Hoima City |
| Asinansi Nyakato | People's Front for Freedom | City Woman MP | Hoima City |
| Pius Wakabi | National Resistance Movement | Bugahya | Hoima District |
| Gerald Kasigwa | National Resistance Movement | Kigorobya | Hoima District |
| Irene Linda Mugisha | National Resistance Movement | District Woman Representative | Fort Portal City |
| Mugisha Muhanga Margaret | National Resistance Movement | Fortportal North Division | Fort Portal City |
| Ronald Muhenda | INDEP | Fortportal Central Division | Fort Portal City |
| Agaba Peter | National Resistance Movement | Ibanda Municipality | Ibanda District |
| Guma David Gumisiriza | National Resistance Movement | Ibanda county North | Ibanda District |
| Ninkusiima John Paul | National Resistance Movement | Ibanda county South | Ibanda District |
| Kaliisa Jovrine Kyomukama | National Resistance Movement | District Woman Representative | Ibanda District |
| Abed Nasser Mudiobole | National Unity Platform | Iganga Municipality | Iganga District |
| Samuel Kungu | National Resistance Movement | Kigulu North | Iganga District |
| Andrew Kaluyu Kizza | National Unity Platform | Kigulu South | Iganga District |
| Mariam Seif | National Resistance Movement | District Woman Representative | Iganga District |
| Kangwagye Stephen Rwakanuuma | National Resistance Movement | Bukanga County | Isingiro District |
| Byanyima Nathan | National Resistance Movement | Bukanga North | Isingiro District |
| Bright Rwamirama | National Resistance Movement | Isingiro North | Isingiro District |
| Mujuni Asensio Maari | National Resistance Movement | Isingiro South | Isingiro District |
| Tumwesigye Anthony | National Resistance Movement | Isingiro West | Isingiro District |
| Ruteraho Lillian | National Resistance Movement | District Woman Representative | Isingiro District |
| Sarah Lwansasula | National Unity Platform | City Woman MP | Jinja City |
| Hussein Muyonjo Swengere | National Unity Platform | Jinja North Division | Jinja City |
| Paul Mwiru | National Unity Platform | Jinja South East Division | Jinja City |
| Timothy Batuwa Lusala | National Unity Platform | Jinja South West Division | Jinja City |
| Peace Tibyaze | National Resistance Movement | District Woman Representative | Jinja District |
| John Odwori | National Unity Platform | Kagoma North | Jinja District |
| John Odwori | National Unity Platform | Kagoma South | Jinja District |
| Kiirya Grace Paddy Wanzala | Forum for Democratic Change | Butembe County | Jinja District |
| Baryayanga Andrew | National Resistance Movement | Kabale Municipality | Kabale District |
| Protazio Begumisa | National Resistance Movement | Ndorwa East | Kabale District |
| Eliab Naturinda | National Resistance Movement | Ndorwa West | Kabale District |
| Enid Origumisiriza | National Resistance Movement | District Woman Representative | Kabale District |
| MUGENYI JOSEPH | National Resistance Movement | Burahya | Kabarole District |
| KIRUNGI ANNET PAMELA | National Resistance Movement | District Woman Representative | Kabarole District |
| Alfred Elalu Edakasi | National Resistance Movement | Kaberamaido | Kaberamaido District |
| Francis Okullo | National Resistance Movement | Ochero | Kaberamaido District |
| Jane Frances Okili | National Resistance Movement | District Woman Representative | Kaberamaido District |
| Twesige Stephen | National Resistance Movement | Buyaga East | Kagadi District |
| Namara Denis | National Resistance Movement | Buyaga West | Kagadi District |
| Naziiwa Margaret | National Resistance Movement | District Woman Representative | Kagadi District |
| Ongalo Obote Clement Kenneth | National Resistance Movement | Kalaki County | Kalaki District |
| Maria Goretti Ajilo | National Resistance Movement | District Woman Representative | Kalaki District |
| Nkeretanyi Kiruuluta Jr | National Unity Platform | Kalungu East | Kalungu District |
| Joseph Gonzaga Ssewungu | National Unity Platform | Kalungu West | Kalungu District |
| | | District Woman Representative | Kalungu District |
| Minsa Kabanda | National Resistance Movement | Kampala Central Division | Kampala District |
| Elias Luyimbazi Nalukoola | National Unity Platform | Kawempe North | Kampala District |
| Bashir Kazibwe | National Unity Platform | Kawempe South | Kampala District |
| Abubaker Kawalya | National Unity Platform | Lubaga North | Kampala District |
| Eugenia Nassolo | National Unity Platform | Lubaga South | Kampala District |
| Ali Nganda Kasirye Mulyanyama | National Unity Platform | Makindye East | Kampala District |
| Zahara Maala Luyirika | National Unity Platform | Makindye West | Kampala District |
| Fredrick Ruhindi | National Resistance Movement | Nakawa East | Kampala District |
| Joel Ssenyonyi (Leader of the Opposition) | National Unity Platform | Nakawa West | Kampala District |
| Shamim Malende | National Unity Platform | District Woman Representative | Kampala District |
| | | Kibale | Kamwenge District |
| | | Kibale East | Kamwenge District |
| | | District Woman Representative | Kamwenge District |
| James Kaberuka Nyiringiyimana | National Resistance Movement | Kinkinzi West | Kanungu District |
| Chris Baryomunsi | National Resistance Movement | Kinkizi East | Kanungu District |
| Namara Betty Mutabazi | National Resistance Movement | District Woman Representative | Kanungu District |
| Kitiyo Patrick | INDEP | Kapchorwa Municipality | Kapchorwa District |
| Twala Fadhil | National Resistance Movement | Tingei | Kapchorwa District |
| Chemutai Phyllis | INDEP | District Woman Representative | Kapchorwa District |
| Francis Akorikin | National Resistance Movement | Kapelebyong | Kapelebyong District |
| Jacinta Atuto | National Resistance Movement | District Woman Representative | Kapelebyong District |
| | | Dodoth West | Karenga District |
| | | Napore West | Karenga District |
| | | District Woman Representative | Karenga District |
| | | Ngariam | Katakwi District |
| Solomon Ossiya Alemu | National Resistance Movement | Toroma | Katakwi District |
| Richard Ongorok | National Resistance Movement | Usuk | Katakwi District |
| | | District Woman Representative | Katakwi District |
| Charles Tebandeke | National Unity Platform | Bbaale | Kayunga District |
| Amos Lugolobi | National Resistance Movement | Ntenjeru North | Kayunga District |
| Fred Baseke | National Resistance Movement | Ntenjeru South | Kayunga District |
| Harriet Nakwedde | National Unity Platform | District Woman Representative | Kayunga District |
| Dan Kimosho | National Resistance Movement | Kazo | Kazo District |
| Molly Kamukama | National Resistance Movement | District Woman Representative | Kazo District |
| | | Buyanja | Kibaale District |
| | | Buyanja | Kibaale District |
| | | Buyanja | Kibaale District |
| | | Kiboga East | Kiboga District |
| | | Kiboga West | Kiboga District |
| | | Kabweri | Kibuku District |
| | | Kibuku | Kibuku District |
| | | District Woman Representative | Kibuku District |
| | | Buhaguzi | Kibuku District |
| | | Buhaguzi East | Kibuku District |
| | | District Woman Representative | Kibuku District |
| | | Kashongi | Kiruhura District |
| | | Nyabushozi | Kiruhura District |
| | | District Woman Representative | Kiruhura District |
| Christine Nakimwero Kaaya | National Unity Platform | District Woman Representative | Kiboga District |
| | | Kibanda North | Kiryandongo District |
| | | Kibanda South | Kiryandongo District |
| | | District Woman Representative | Kiryandongo District |
| | | Bufumbira East | Kisoro District |
| | | Bufumbira North | Kisoro District |
| | | Bufumbira South | Kisoro District |
| | | Bukimbiri | Kisoro District |
| | | Kisoro Municipality | Kisoro District |
| | | District Woman Representative | Kisoro District |
| | | Kitagwenda | Kitagwenda District |
| | | District Woman Representative | Kitagwenda District |
| Emmanuel Banya | National Resistance Movement | Koboko | Koboko District |
| Charles Ayume | National Resistance Movement | Koboko Municipality | Koboko District |
| Musa Noah | National Resistance Movement | Koboko North | Koboko District |
| Sherifa Aate Taban Amin | INDEP | District Woman Representative | Koboko District |
| Opio Sanuel Acuti | National Resistance Movement | Kole North | Kole District |
| Okot Boniface | National Resistance Movement | Kole South | Kole District |
| Aceng Sandra Odongo | National Resistance Movement | District Woman Representative | Kole District |
| | | Jie | Kotido District |
| | | Kotido Municipality | Kotido District |
| | | District Woman Representative | Kotido District |
| Peter Simon Okwalinga | National Resistance Movement | Kanyum | Kumi District |
| Sidronious Opolot Okaasai | National Resistance Movement | Kumi | Kumi District |
| Silas Aogon | INDEP | Kumi Municipality | Kumi District |
| Christine Apolot | INDEP | District Woman Representative | Kumi District |
| Eron Tony | National Resistance Movement | Kwania | Kwania District |
| Ongu Tar | Uganda People's Congress | Kwania North | Kwania District |
| Kenny Auma (Auma Kenny Lapat) | Uganda People's Congress | District Woman Representative | Kwania District |
| | | Kween | Kween District |
| | | Soi | Kween District |
| | | District Woman Representative | Kween District |
| | | Kyaka Central | Kyegegwa District |
| | | Kyaka North | Kyegegwa District |
| | | Kyaka South | Kyegegwa District |
| | | District Woman Representative | Kyegegwa District |
| Methuselah Kasukaali | National Resistance Movement | Mwenge Central | Kyenjojo District |
| Lawrence Akugizibwe | National Resistance Movement | Mwenge North | Kyenjojo District |
| Kuteesa Mary Kamuli | National Resistance Movement | Mwenge South | Kyenjojo District |
| Spellanza Baguma Muhenda | INDEP | District Woman Representative | Kyenjojo District |
| Kaka Lubega Ismail Uthuman | National Resistance Movement | Kakuuto County | Kyotera District |
| Rose Fortunate Nantongo | National Unity Platform | Kyotera | Kyotera District |
| Haruna Kasolo Kyeyune | National Resistance Movement | Kyotera county | Kyotera District |
| | | District Woman Representative | Kyotera District |
| Johnson Nyeko Kezikiya | National Resistance Movement | Lamwo | Lamwo District |
| | | Palabek | Lamwo District |
| | | District Woman Representative | Lamwo District |
| | | Luuka North | Luuka District |
| | | Luuka South | Luuka District |
| | | District Woman Representative | Luuka District |
| | | Kabula | Lyantonde District |
| | | District Woman Representative | Lyantonde District |
| | | Lower Madi | Madi-Okollo District |
| | | Upper Madi | Madi-Okollo District |
| Joanne Aniku Okia | National Resistance Movement | District Woman Representative | Madi-Okollo District |
| Chris Matembu | INDEP | Bubulo West | Manafwa District |
| Godfrey Matembu | National Resistance Movement | Butiru | Manafwa District |
| Rose Mutonyi | INDEP | District Woman Representative | Manafwa District |
| | | Maracha | Maracha District |
| | | Maracha East | Maracha District |
| | | District Woman Representative | Maracha District |
| | | Bunya East | Mayuge District |
| | | Bunya South | Mayuge District |
| | | Bunya West | Mayuge District |
| | | District Woman Representative | Mayuge District |
| Christopher Bakashaba | National Resistance Movement | Mbarara City North | Mbarara City |
| Mwine Mpaka Rwamirama | National Resistance Movement | Mbarara City South | Mbarara City |
| Loyda Kyarikunda Twinomujuni | National Resistance Movement | District Woman Representative | Mbarara City |
| Patrick Musinguzi | National Resistance Movement | Kashari North | Mbarara District |
| JB Tumusiime Bamuturaki | National Resistance Movement | Kashari South | Mbarara District |
| | | District Woman Representative | Mbarara District |
| | | Ruhinda | Mitooma District |
| Thomas Tayebwa | National Resistance Movement | Ruhinda North | Mitooma District |
| Arthur Atuheire Kazoora | National Resistance Movement | Ruhinda South | Mitooma District |
| Rebecca Kyarampe | National Resistance Movement | District Woman Representative | Mitooma District |
| | | Matheniko | Moroto District |
| | | Moroto Municipality | Moroto District |
| Leo Elem | Uganda People's Congress | Moroto County | Moroto District |
| | | Tepeth | Moroto District |
| | | District Woman Representative | Moroto District |
| | | Moyo | Moyo District |
| Tom Aleru Azaa | National Resistance Movement | Moyo West | Moyo District |
| Bernadette Candia Kodili | National Resistance Movement | District Woman Representative | Moyo District |
| Amelia Kyambadde | National Resistance Movement | Mawokota North | Mpigi District |
| Suzan Nakawuki Nsambu | National Resistance Movement | Mawokota South | Mpigi District |
| Teddy Nambooze | National Resistance Movement | District Woman Representative | Mpigi District |
| Kakooza Joseph | National Resistance Movement | Buwekula | Mubende District |
| Mubangizi Dedan | National Resistance Movement | Buwekula South | Mubende District |
| Kabanda David | National Resistance Movement | Kasambya | Mubende District |
| Nabawanuka Sumaya | National Unity Platform | Mubende Municipality | Mubende District |
| Nakazibwe Hope Grania | National Resistance Movement | District Woman Representative | Mubende District |
| Robert Maseruka | National Unity Platform | Mukono County South | Mukono District |
| Kiwanuka Abdallah | National Unity Platform | Mukono County North | Mukono District |
| Bakireke Betty Nambooze | National Unity Platform | Mukono Municipality | Mukono District |
| Sulaiman Kiwanuka | National Unity Platform | Nakifuma County | Mukono District |
| Sheilah Amaniyo | National Unity Platform | District Woman Representative | Mukono District |
| Achia Remigio | National Resistance Movement | Pian | Nabilatuk District |
| Lokubal Emma | National Resistance Movement | District Woman Representative | Nabilatuk District |
| Wilberforce Ahebwa | National Resistance Movement | Nakaseke North | Nakaseke District |
| Kabuye Kyofatogabye | National Resistance Movement | Nakaseke Central | Nakaseke District |
| Charles Nsereko Basajjassubi | National Resistance Movement | Nakaseke South | Nakaseke District |
| Sarah Najjuma | National Resistance Movement | District Woman Representative | Nakaseke District |
| | | Bubulo East | Namisindwa District |
| | | Namisindwa | Namisindwa District |
| | | District Woman Representative | Namisindwa District |
| | | Bukono | Namutumba District |
| | | Busiki | Namutumba District |
| | | Busiki North | Namutumba District |
| | | District Woman Representative | Namutumba District |
| ILUKOL EMMANUEL | National Resistance Movement | Bokora County | Napak District |
| LOCAP PETERKHEN | National Resistance Movement | Bokora East | Napak District |
| NAKUT FAITH LORU | National Resistance Movement | District Woman Representative | Napak District |
| ONGIERTHO EMMANUEL JOR | INDEP | Nebbi Municipality | Nebbi District |
| OTIMGIW ISAAC ISMAIL | National Resistance Movement | Padyere | Nebbi District |
| NYAMUTORO PHIONA | National Resistance Movement | District Woman Representative | Nebbi District |
| Isamat Abraham | National Resistance Movement | Kapir | Ngora District |
| Juliet Achayo Lodou | National Resistance Movement | Ngora | Ngora District |
| Josephine Pedun | National Resistance Movement | District Woman Representative | Ngora District |
| Rugumayo Edson | National Resistance Movement | Ntoroko | Ntoroko District |
| MUJUNGU JENNIFER K | National Resistance Movement | District Woman Representative | Ntoroko District |
| TUKAHIRWA JAMES BYENJURU HUNTER | National Resistance Movement | Kajara | Ntungamo District |
| Gerald Karuhanga | INDEP | Ntungamo Municipality | Ntungamo District |
| Beatrice Rwakimari | National Resistance Movement | Ruhama County | Ntungamo District |
| Moses Kahima | National Resistance Movement | Ruhama East | Ntungamo District |
| Naome Kabasharira | National Resistance Movement | Rushenyi County | Ntungamo District |
| Namanya Viola Buroko | National Resistance Movement | District Woman Representative | Ntungamo District |
| Denis Geoffrey Opiyo | Democratic Party | Nwoya | Nwoya District |
| Tony Awany | National Resistance Movement | Nwoya county | Nwoya District |
| Geoffrey Charles Okello | Democratic Party | Nwoya East | Nwoya District |
| Judith Peace Acan Onen | INDEP | District Woman Representative | Nwoya District |
| Hassan Caps Fungaro | Forum for Democratic Chance | Obongi | Obongi District |
| George Didi Bhoka | National Resistance Movement | Obongi County | Obongi District |
| Harriet Joyo | INDEP | District Woman Representative | Obongi District |
| Andrew Ojok Oulanyah | | Omoro | Omoro District |
| Simon Peter Okot | Democratic Party | Torchi | Omoro District |
| Catherine Lamwaka | National Resistance Movement | District Woman Representative | Omoro District |
| Omara Paul | National Resistance Movement | Otuke County | Otuke District |
| Acon Julius Bua | National Resistance Movement | Otuke East | Otuke District |
| Abeja Susan Jolly | National Resistance Movement | District Woman Representative | Otuke District |
| Eunice Apio Atuku | Uganda People's Congress | Oyam North | Oyam District |
| Patrick Ogwang Obura | National Resistance Movement | Oyam South | Oyam District |
| Alum Sandra Ogwang Santa | Uganda People's Congress | District Woman Representative | Oyam District |
| ALENYO MARSHALL GODFREY | National Resistance Movement | Jonam | Pakwach District |
| Avur Jane Pacutho | National Resistance Movement | District Woman Representative | Pakwach District |
| SSEMWANGA GYAVIIRA | National Resistance Movement | Buyamba | Rakai District |
| TAYEBWA DIDAS KABUMBUZA | National Resistance Movement | Kooki | Rakai District |
| SUUBI KYINYAMATAMA JULIET K | National Resistance Movement | District Woman Representative | Rakai District |
| MUSASIZI HENRY ARIGANYIRA | National Resistance Movement | Rubanda East | Rubanda District |
| KABAASA BALABA BRUCE | National Resistance Movement | Rubanda West | Rubanda District |
| NINSIIMA EVELYNE | National Resistance Movement | District Woman Representative | Rubanda District |
| Cadet Benjamin | National Resistance Movement | Bunyaruguru | Rubirizi District |
| ATWIJUKIRE BOAZ | National Resistance Movement | Katerera | Rubirizi District |
| Jeniva Arinaitwe | National Resistance Movement | District Woman Representative | Rubirizi District |
| KICONCO KATABAAZI PATRICK | National Resistance Movement | Rukiga | Rukiga District |
| ALINATIWE SYLVIA TUMUHEIRWE | National Resistance Movement | District Woman Representative | Rukiga District |
| MWESIGWA MATHIAS | National Resistance Movement | RUBABO COUNTY | Rukungiri District |
| Jim Muhwezi | National Resistance Movement | Rujumbura county | Rukungiri District |
| Henry Tumukunde | National Resistance Movement | Rukungiri Municipality | Rukungiri District |
| TURYAHIKAYO KEBIRUNGI MARY PAULA | National Resistance Movement | District Woman Representative | Rukungiri District |
| Amos Kankunda | National Resistance Movement | Rwampara | Rwampara District |
| Ngabirano Charles | INDEP | Rwampara East | Rwampara District |
| Kansiime Annah | National Resistance Movement | District Woman Representative | Rwampara District |
| Rwashande Emmanuel | National Resistance Movement | Lwemiyaga | Sembabule District |
| Aine Godfrey Kaguta | National Resistance Movement | Mawogola North | Sembabule District |
| Byuma Oswald Dez | National Resistance Movement | Mawogola South | Sembabule District |
| Bangirana Kawooya Anifa | National Resistance Movement | Mawogola West | Sembabule District |
| Nambaziira Florence | National Resistance Movement | District Woman Representative | Sembabule District |
| Paul Emaju | National Resistance Movement | Kasilo | Serere District |
| Peter Ojiit | National Resistance Movement | Pingire | Serere District |
| Emmanuel Omoding | National Resistance Movement | Serere County | Serere District |
| Richard Ongorok | National Resistance Movement | Usuk County | Serere District |
| Esther Lucy Achom | INDEP | District Woman Representative | Serere District |
| Dicksons Kateshumbwa | National Resistance Movement | Sheema Municipality | Sheema District |
| Elioda Tumwesigye | National Resistance Movement | Sheema North | Sheema District |
| Ephraim Kamuntu | National Resistance Movement | Sheema South | Sheema District |
| Katusiime Adrine Mwebesa | National Resistance Movement | District Woman Representative | Sheema District |
| Julius Nyakiyi | National Resistance Movement | Budadiri East | Sironko District |
| Godfrey Wanyoto (GodMark) | | Budadiri West | Sironko District |
| Aisha Lumolo Mafabi | National Resistance Movement | District Woman Representative | Sironko District |
| Joan Acom Alobo | FDC | City Womam MP | Soroti City |
| Moses Attan Okia | FDC | East Division | Soroti City |
| David Calvin Echodu | National Resistance Movement | Soroti West | Soroti City |
| Peter Edeku | National Resistance Movement | Dakabela | Soroti District |
| Herbert Edmund Arik | INDEP | Gweri | Soroti District |
| Patrick Aeku | FDC | Soroti | Soroti District |
| Anna Ebaju Adeke | FDC | District Woman Representative | Soroti District |
| Babanga Wilfred Erima | National Resistance Movement | Terego East | Terego District |
| Dramviku Eric Sabiiti | National Resistance Movement | Terego West | Terego District |
| Obigah Rose | National Resistance Movement | District Woman Representative | Terego District |
| Owino Nicholas Simon | National Resistance Movement | Tororo County North | Tororo District |
| Angura Fredrick | National Resistance Movement | Tororo County South | Tororo District |
| Shyam Jay Tanna | INDEP | Tororo Municipality | Tororo District |
| Jacob Marksons Oboth-Oboth | National Resistance Movement | West Budama Central | Tororo District |
| Richard Owere Machika | National Resistance Movement | West Budama North | Tororo District |
| George Oketcho | National Resistance Movement | West Budama South | Tororo District |
| Angela Akoth Nzokire | INDEP | District Woman Representative | Tororo District |
| Naluyima Betty Ethel | NUP | District Woman Representative | Wakiso District |
| Nkunyingi Muwada | NUP | Kyadondo East | Wakiso District |
| George Musisi | NUP | Kira Municipality | Wakiso District |
| Zambali Bulasio Mukasa | NUP | Nansana Municipality | Wakiso District |
| David Sserukenya | NUP | Makindye - Ssabagabo Municipality | Wakiso District |
| Emmanuel Magoola | INDEP | Busiro East | Wakiso District |
| Moses Mayanja | NUP | Busiro North | Wakiso District |
| Apio Kanan | National Resistance Movement | Busiro South | Wakiso District |
| Shaka Bashaija | National Resistance Movement | Entebbe Municipality | Wakiso District |
| Ezama Siraji Brahan Abason | National Resistance Movement | Aringa | Yumbe District |
| Oleru Huda | National Resistance Movement | Aringa East | Yumbe District |
| Karim Musa | INDEP | Aringa North | Yumbe District |
| Alioni Yorke Odria | National Resistance Movement | Aringa South | Yumbe District |
| Avako Melsa Naima Gule | National Resistance Movement | District Woman Representative | Yumbe District |
| Okumu Gabriel | National Resistance Movement | Okoro | Zombo District |
| Grace Freedom Kwiyucwiny | National Resistance Movement | Ora | Zombo District |
| Esther Afoyocan | National Resistance Movement | District Woman Representative | Zombo District |
| Robert Ssewagudde | National Resistance Movement | National Representative Persons with Disabilities (PWDs) | Wakiso District |
| Acan Joyce Okeny | National Resistance Movement | National Member of Parliament representative for Persons with Disabilities (PWDs). | |
| WAAKO JOY PEGGY | National Resistance Movement | OLDER PERSONS REPRESENTATIVE FEMALE | |
| SSEMWANGA JOSEPH | | UPDF REPRESENTATIVE | |
| OKIDING SAM | | UPDF REPRESENTATIVE | |
| OFWONO OPONDO P’ODEL | | OLDER PERSONS REPRESENTATIVE EASTERN | |
| NEKESA CHRISTINE SITUMA | | UPDF REPRESENTATIVE | |
| NDEEZI ALEX | | PWD REPRESENTATIVE | |
| NAMUBIRU RWABUSHAIJA MARGARET | | WORKERS REPRESENTATIVE | |
| NAKKU FIONA | | WORKERS REPRESENTATIVE FEMALE | |
| MUGIRA JAMES | | UPDF REPRESENTATIVE | |
| MPINDI BUMALI | | PWD REPRESENTATIVE | |
| MEEME SYLIVIA | | UPDF REPRESENTATIVE | |
| MBABAZI JACQUELINE | | OLDER PERSONS REPRESENTATIVE WESTERN | |
| MASIKO HENRY MOSES | | UPDF REPRESENTATIVE | |
| KINALWA JAMES | | UPDF REPRESENTATIVE | |
| KAVUMA SAMUEL | | UPDF REPRESENTATIVE | |
| KANUSHU LAURA | | PWD REPRESENTATIVE | |
| KAKOOZA JAMES | | OLDER PERSONS REPRESENTATIVE CENTRAL | |
| IKIRIZA KNIGHT | | UPDF REPRESENTATIVE | |
| GONYI DAVID ROBERT | | UPDF REPRESENTATIVE | |
| CHALLA ELMA KAPEL | National Resistance Movement | YOUTH REPRESENTATIVE NORTHERN | |
| BIRUNGI ANNET | | WORKERS REPRESENTATIVE | |
| BEGIIRA SAMUEL | National Resistance Movement | YOUTH REPRESENTATIVE CENTRAL | |
| ARINAITWE RWAKAJARA KATAMBUKA | National Resistance Movement | WORKERS REPRESENTATIVE | |
| AKUMU CATHERINE MAVENJINA | National Resistance Movement | OLDER PERSONS REPRESENTATIVE NORTHERN | |
| AGABA GILBERT | | WORKERS REPRESENTATIVE | |
| ACAN JOYCE OKENY | National Resistance Movement | PWD REPRESENTATIVE | |
