= Twaha Kagabo =

Ugandan politician and medical doctor

Dr. Twaha Kagabo

Member of Parliament for Bukoto South
- In office 2021–2026
- Preceded by: Muyanja Mbabaali
- Succeeded by: Hakim Kizza Sawula

Personal details
- Occupation: Politician, medical doctor

Twaha Kagabo is a Ugandan medical doctor and politician who served as the Member of Parliament for Bukoto South Constituency in Lwengo District from 2021 to 2026. He was elected in the 2021 general election on the ticket of the National Unity Platform (NUP).

== Political career ==
Kagabo won the Bukoto South parliamentary seat in the 2021 Ugandan general election as a candidate for the National Unity Platform, defeating the incumbent.

Ahead of the 2026 general elections, Kagabo left the National Unity Platform and sought the nomination of the ruling National Resistance Movement (NRM) party for the same constituency. He lost the NRM primary election to former MP Muyanja Mbabaali. Following his defeat in the party primaries, Kagabo announced his intention to contest the parliamentary seat as an independent candidate, alleging irregularities in the primary election process.

He was also reported to have briefly associated with the Patriotic League of Uganda (PLU), a political pressure group linked to General Muhoozi Kainerugaba, though he later clarified his political positioning during the election period. In the January 2026 general election, Kagabo lost the Bukoto South parliamentary seat.

== Medical background and community work ==
Dr. Kagabo is a medical doctor by profession who gained popularity in Bukoto South. During his tenure as Member of Parliament, he organised and funded free medical camps and surgical services for residents of Bukoto South Constituency he also provided an ambulance service to support patients and emergency situations. Many residents, particularly vulnerable families had benefited from the initiatives during his five-year term in parliament . However, shortly after losing his parliamentary seat in 2026, Kagabo announced the suspension of the free medical services, citing the loss of parliamentary income that had helped sustain the initiatives.

== See also ==
- Muyanja Mbabaali
- Muhoozi Kainerugaba
- Samuel Ediau
- Jesca Ababiku
- Musa Ecweru
- Fred Jalameso
- Benson Lugwar
- Denis Obua (politician)
- Jesca Ababiku
