= Ssebugga Kimeze =

Ugandan politician

- Born: 27 August 1960 (age 66); Nakasongola, Uganda
- Citizenship: Uganda
- Education: Makerere University (Bachelor of Science in Engineering); University of Leeds (Master of Science in Engineering)
- Occupations: Civil engineer and politician
- Known for: Politics
- Title: Member of Parliament
- Political party: National Resistance Movement

Ssebugga Kimeze also known as Ssebugga Bernardo Kimeze (born 27 August 1960), is a Ugandan civil engineer and the elected Member of Parliament for Budyebo County, Nakasongola District, serving the 2026–2031 parliamentary term.

== Early life and Educational background ==
Ssebugga was born on 27 August 1960 in Ntagaara, Nakatoogo Village, Nakasongola District, Uganda. He attended Makerere University, where he earned a Bachelor of Science (BSc) in Engineering. He then obtained a Master of Science (MSc) in Engineering from the University of Leeds (UK) and later earned a Master of Business Administration (MBA) from the Eastern and Southern African Management Institute (ESAMI).

== Career ==
Ssebugga began his career in 1984 as a civil engineer in the Ministry of Works, where he rose to the position of Commissioner. He served as Director of Operations at the Uganda National Roads Authority (UNRA) from 2008 to 2013, and as Acting Executive Director from 2013 to 2014.

== Political career ==
In 2025, Ssebugga was selected by the National Resistance Movement (NRM) to contest for the position of Member of Parliament for Budyebo County, Nakasongola District, and he won the seat in the 2026 elections for the 2026–2031 parliamentary term.

== Memberships and associations ==
Ssebugga is a member of the Uganda Institution of Professional Engineers (FUIPE) and a registered engineer (R.Eng), he is also a member of the Chartered Institution of Highways and Transportation (MIHT) and a member of the Chartered Institute of Arbitrators (MCIArb).

Ssebugga is a former president of the Uganda Institution of Professional Engineers (UIPE), he served as a member of the Engineers Registration Board of Uganda from 2000 to 2006, and he is also a member of the Governing Council of the Uganda Association of Consulting Engineers (UACE).

== See also ==
- Victorious Zawedde
- Margaret Komuhangi
- Grace Tubwita
- Parliament of Uganda
- List of members of the twelfth Parliament of Uganda
