= Josephine Ibaseret =

Member of Parliament for Agule County

Member of the U.S. House of Representatives from 's Pallisa District district
- Incumbent
- Assumed office 2026
- Constituency: Agule County

Personal details
- Born: Josephine Ibaseret Agule, Pallisa District, Uganda
- Citizenship: Uganda
- Occupation: Politician
- Profession: Public administrator
- Known for: Community development and political leadership

Josephine Ibaseret is a Ugandan politician and the newly elected Member of Parliament for Agule County in Pallisa District during the 2026 general elections. She belongs to the National Resistance Movement (NRM) as a political party.

== Political career ==
Ibaseret was the deputy Resident District Commissioner (RDC) for Namisindwa but resigned in May 2025 in preparation to contest as a Member of Parliament.

She first contested during the National Resistance Movement primaries where she won six men hence becoming the NRM flag bearer. She joined the race for Agule county in general and she won during the January 2026 elections.

== Personal life ==
Ibaseret grew up in Agule and got married there. Prior to being elected as a Member of Parliament she used to support local communities like distributing wheelchairs via the OJ Care Foundation, supporting widows with farming tools and attire through a compassion initiative.

== See also ==
- Parliament of Uganda
- Member of Parliament
- List of members of the twelfth Parliament of Uganda
- National Resistance Movement
