= Irene Linda Mugisha =

Ugandan politician, psychologist

Irene Linda Mugisa, Amooti.
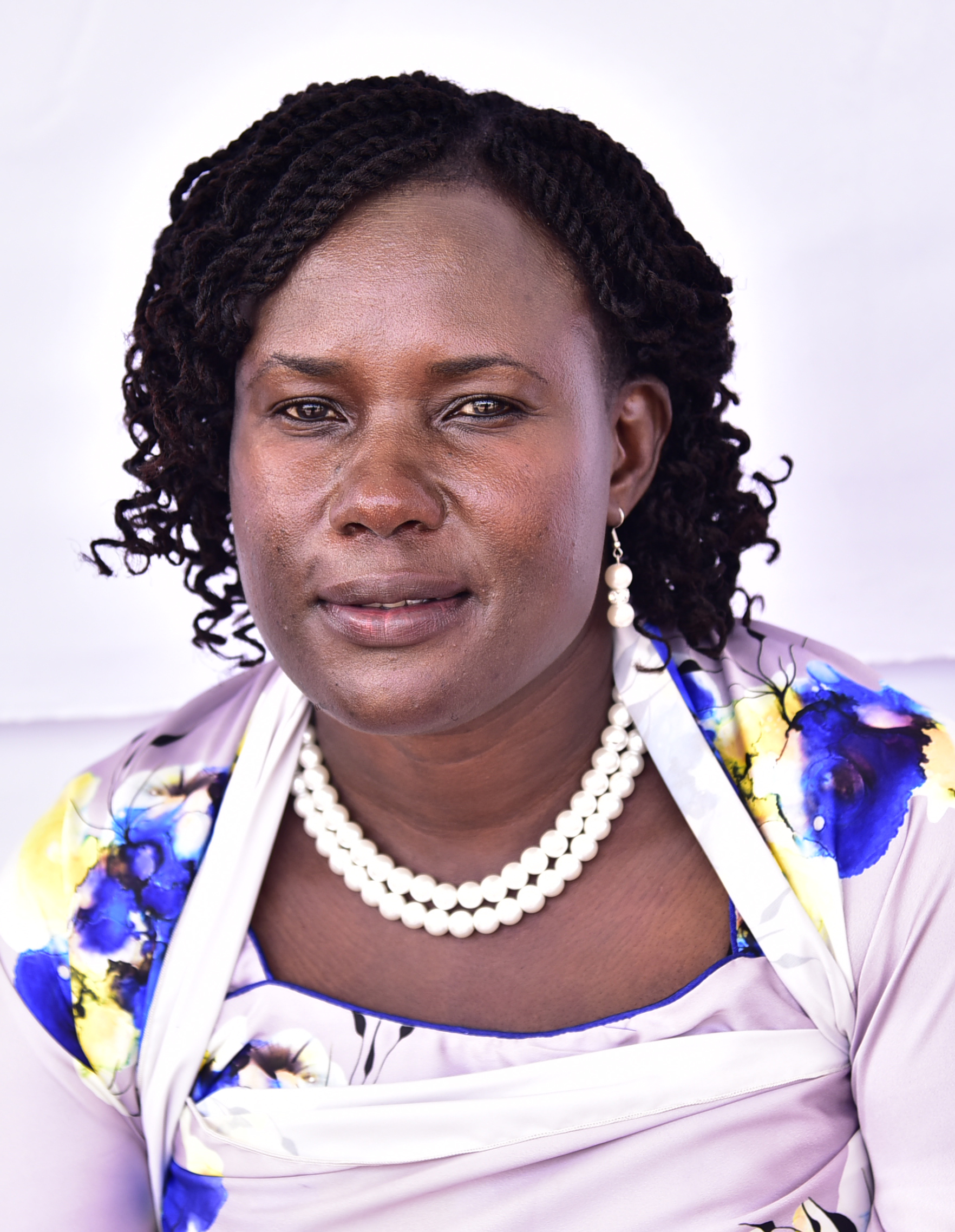
- Citizenship: Ugandan
- Education: Moon University; Uganda Martyrs University
- Occupations: Politician, and psychologist
- Employer(s): Kabarole Local Government Council; Kasusu Cell, Fort Portal City; South Division Fort Portal Municipality; Parliament of Uganda
- Known for: Politics
- Title: Member of Parliament
- Political party: National Resistance Movement

Irene Linda Mugisa, is a female Ugandan politician, psychologist and a member of parliament for the Fort Portal City in the 11th Parliament of Uganda representing the National Resistance Movement party.

== Early life and education ==
Mugisa attained a Bachelor's degree for social and community development from Mountain of the Moon University, a diploma in counselling psychology from Uganda Martyrs University, and certificates in gender and development, policy making and implementation in local government, finance business and customer management.

== Career ==
Mugisa has a political experience of a period of 20 years as a councilor and secretary in Kabarole Local Government Council. She is also a community development scientist with advocacy and counselling skills and has worked with some non-governmental organisations.

In 1997, Mugisa served as the general secretary of Kasusu cell in Central Division, Fort Portal City. She was also secretary for gender at the South Division Fort Portal Municipality.

In 2001, she was elected the Kabarole District youth councilor and later she was appointed the secretary for finance and planning for the district council at the age 24 years and became the youngest among other leaders.

In 2021, Mugisa won the Fort Portal City Woman MP race.

== See also ==
- List of members of the twelfth Parliament of Uganda
- Parliament of Uganda
- National Resistance Movement
