= Lukyamuzi =

Lukyamuzi is a given name and surname. Notable people with the name include:

- David Kalwanga Lukyamuzi (born 1979), Ugandan politician
- Ken Lukyamuzi, Ugandan politician and lawyer
- Lukyamuzi Bashir (born 1986), Ugandan director and producer
