= Joseph Gonzaga Ssewungu =

Shadow Minister for Defence and Veteran Affairs
- Incumbent
- Assumed office June 2026
- Leader: Joel Ssenyonyi

Member of Parliament for Kalungu West County
- Incumbent
- Assumed office 16 May 2011

Shadow Minister for Education
- In office 2024 – June 2026

Democratic Party Chief Whip in Parliament
- In office 2016–2021

Personal details
- Born: Joseph Gonzaga Ssewungu; June 21, 1969 (age 57) Uganda
- Citizenship: Ugandan
- Party: National Unity Platform (2020–present)
- Profession: Teacher, lawyer

Joseph Gonzaga Ssewungu also known as Gonzaga Sewungu (born 21 June 1969) is a Ugandan teacher, lawyer and Politician who serves as the Member of Parliament (MP) for Kalungu West County in Kalungu District.

== Career ==
Ssewungu began his professional career as a teacher before qualifying as a lawyer. He later joined the Democratic Party (DP) and entered active politics.

He was elected Member of Parliament for Kalungu West County in the 2011 general election, representing the Democratic Party in the 9th Parliament (2011–2016). During his first term, he served on the Parliamentary Select Committee that investigated allegations of mismanagement at the National Social Security Fund (NSSF) in 2014.

Ssewungu was re-elected in the 2016 general election to serve in the 10th Parliament (2016–2021). During this term, he served as the Democratic Party Chief Whip in Parliament while representing Kalungu West County. In 2020, he left the Democratic Party and joined the National Unity Platform (NUP) ahead of the 2021 general election.

In the 2021 general election, he was re-elected as Member of Parliament for Kalungu West County on the National Unity Platform (NUP) ticket, serving in the 11th Parliament (2021–2026). During this term, he was appointed Deputy Chairperson of the Committee on Government Assurances and Implementation at the beginning of the 11th Parliament. In 2024, he was redesignate as chairperson of the same committee before serving as the Shadow Minister for Education.

Following the 2026 general election, Ssewungu was re-elected to represent Kalungu West County in the 12th Parliament (2026–2031). In June 2026, the Leader of the Opposition, Joel Ssenyonyi, appointed him Shadow Minister for Defence and Veteran Affairs in the new opposition shadow cabinet. He also serves as a member of the Appointments Committee of Parliament.

== See also ==
- Joel Ssenyonyi
- Harriet Nakweede
- Robert Maseruka
