= Sylvia Tumuheirwe Alinaitwe =

Hon. Sylvia Tumuheirwe Alinaitwe

Woman Member of Parliament for Rukiga District

Former Deputy Managing Director, Finance and Corporate Strategy
- In office 2026–2031
- Constituency: Rukiga District

Personal details
- Occupation: Politician
- Profession: Chartered Accountant
- Known for: Finance, Corporate Strategy, Public Service Leadership

Sylvia Tumuheirwe Alinaitwe, is a Ugandan politician. In the 2026 Ugandan general election, she was elected as the Woman Member of Parliament for Rukiga District to the 12th Parliament of Uganda (2026–2031).

== Education ==
She earned a Master of Business Administration (MBA) with from the Maastricht School of Management in the Netherlands, specializing in Corporate Strategy and Economic Policy. She also holds a Bachelor of Commerce in Finance from Makerere University, Uganda. She is a Chartered Accountant and a member of the Association of Chartered Certified Accountants (ACCA), United Kingdom.

== Career ==
Prior to her entry into parliamentary politics, she formerly served as Deputy Managing Director Finance and Corporate Strategy at the National Water and Sewerage Corporation (NWSC).

== See also ==
- List of members of the twelfth Parliament of Uganda
- Parliament of Uganda
- Caroline Kamusiime
- Jacklyn Jolly Tukamushaba
- Jeniva Arinaitwe
