= Khemis Mzaid =

Ugandan politician and Member of Parliament

Member of Parliament for Arua Central Division
- Incumbent
- Assumed office 2026
- Preceded by: Jackson Lee Buti Atima

Personal details
- Party: Forum for Democratic Change
- Occupation: Politician

Khemis Mzaid is a Ugandan politician and Member of Parliament representing Arua Central Division, Arua city in the 12th Parliament of Uganda (2026–2031).

He was elected in the 2026 general election on the ticket of the Forum for Democratic Change (FDC).

== Political career ==
Before entering Parliament, Mzaid served as Mayor of Arua Central Division, a position he won in the 2021 local government elections under the FDC banner. Prior to becoming mayor, he served as the Local Council III Chairperson of River Oli Division in Arua, northern Uganda.

In Arua Central Division, FDC's Khemis Mzaid won the election with 6,966 votes, ahead of National Resistance Movement's Jackson Lee Buti Atima (5,578), independent candidate Ronald Debo (3,732), NUP's Jackson Obindu (642), Alliance for National Transformation (ANT)'s Kassiano Wadri Ezati (625), and independent Haddad Salim (248).

== See also ==
- List of members of the twelfth Parliament of Uganda
- Kassiano Wadri Ezati
- Musa Ecweru
- Fred Jalameso
- Denis Obua (politician)
