= Samuel Ediau =

Ugandan politician and Member of Parliament

Member of Parliament for Amuria County
- Incumbent
- Assumed office 2026

Personal details
- Party: National Resistance Movement
- Occupation: Politician, educator

Samuel Ediau is a Ugandan politician and Member of Parliament representing Amuria County in the 12th Parliament of Uganda. He was elected in the 2026 general election on the ticket of the National Resistance Movement (NRM).

== Political career ==
Ediau rose to national political prominence during the 2025 NRM party primaries when he contested the Amuria County parliamentary seat. In a significant political upset, he defeated the long-serving State Minister for Works and Transport and incumbent MP Musa Francis Ecweru, securing 29,352 votes to Ecweru's 19,977.

Following his primary victory, Ecweru subsequently withdrew from the 2026 general election contest, allowing Ediau to consolidate support within the party ahead of the national vote. In the 2026 general election, Ediau won the Amuria County seat as the NRM candidate with a clear majority, defeating independent candidate Joseph Epilu among others.

== See also ==
- List of members of the twelfth Parliament of Uganda
- Musa Ecweru
- Fred Jalameso
- Benson Lugwar
- Denis Obua (politician)
- Jesca Ababiku
