= Joan Acom Alobo =

Ugandan politician

Hon Joan Acom Alobo
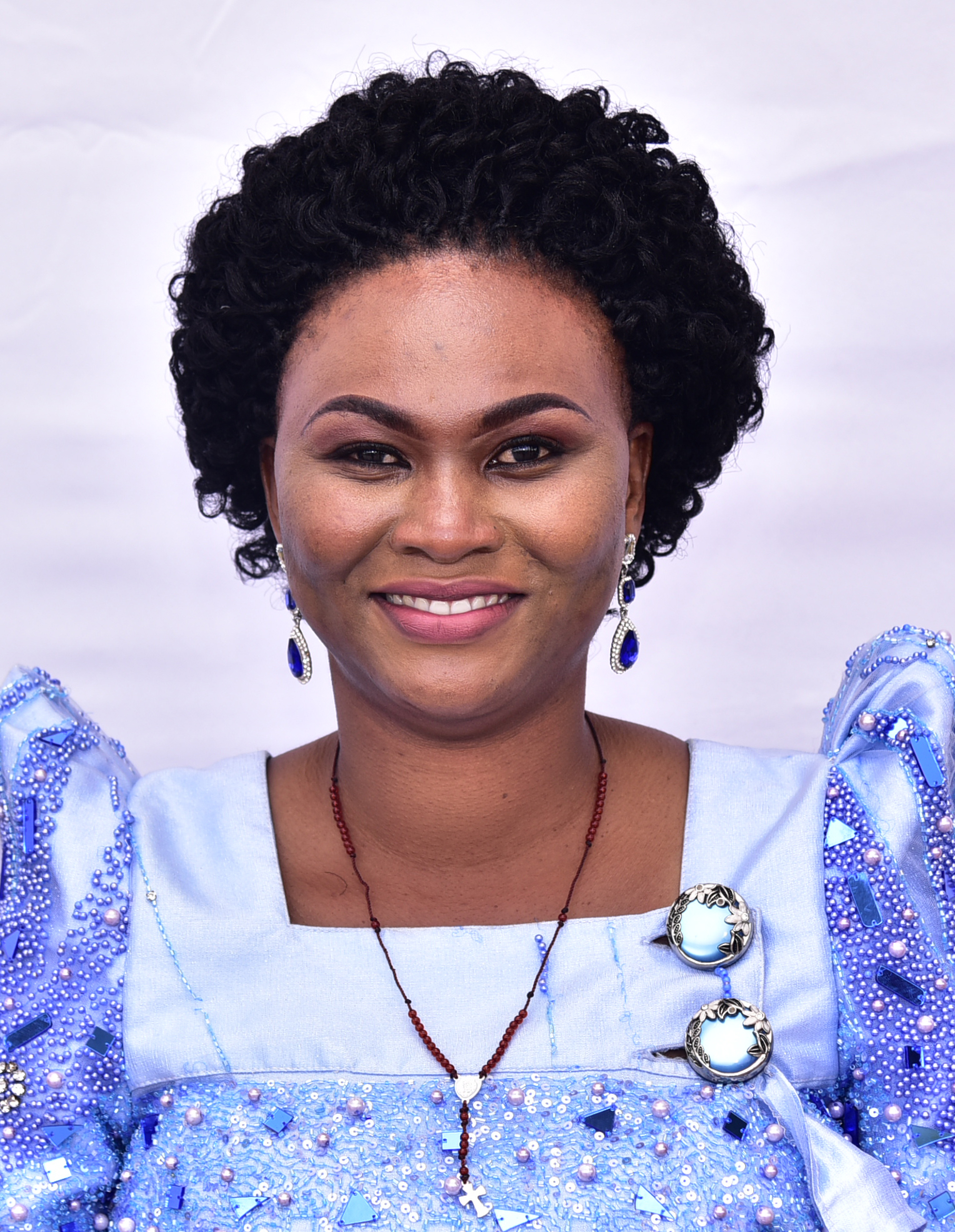
- Born: Uganda
- Citizenship: Uganda
- Occupation: Ugandan politician
- Years active: 2021
- Employer: Parliament of Uganda
- Known for: Politics
- Political party: Forum for Democratic Change
- Website: https://www.parliament.go.ug/

Joan Acom Alobo (born 27 October 1991) is a Ugandan politician serving in the twelfth Parliament of Uganda. She is the Soroti city woman member of Parliament under the Forum for Democratic Change political party. Alobo serves as the Vice Chairperson of Teso Parliamentary Group, and the Secretary General Forum for Democratic Change Youth League.

== Political career ==
When Alobo joined the eleventh Parliament of Uganda, she promised to coordinate and work with Members of Parliament from different political parties for the benefit of Uganda while taking the oath of office. She served on the Committee on Science, Technology and Innovation at the eleventh Parliament of Uganda.

== Arrest ==
Alobo clashed with the Soroti Police for blocking her to meet with market vendors to discuss the problems faced by the business community after approval from the Police. She was arrested alongside Anna Adeke and three other political activists following a standoff with police at Kasangati Town in Wakiso District as they attempted to make their way to the home of detained former presidential candidate, Kizza Besigye.

== See also ==
- List of members of the eleventh Parliament of Uganda
- Parliament of Uganda
- Adeke Anna
