= Angwech Colline =

Ugandan politician

Member of Parliament for Kioga County, Amolatar District

Personal details
- Born: Namasale Subcounty, Amolatar District, Uganda
- Party: Uganda Peoples Congress (UPC)
- Occupation: Politician, Humanitarian
- Known for: Country Director, Hope for Humans; Work with Invisible Children during the LRA insurgency; TEDx New York speaker advocating for LRA war victims; Co-founder, Far Away Friends; Co-founder, Global Leaders School (educating 500 children in Amolatar District)

Angwech Colline is a Ugandan politician and the elected Member of Parliament for Kioga County in Amolatar district, Northern Uganda. She will be serving from May 2026 to 2031 in the 12th Parliament of Uganda. She is a member of the political party called Uganda Peoples Congress(UPC).

== Early life and education ==
Angwech Colline was born in Namasale subcounty in Amolatar district, Lango sub-region, northern Uganda.

== Career ==
Angwech Colline served as a country director for Hope for Humans, an organization supporting children suffering from nodding syndrome in northern Uganda.

She also worked with an organization called Invisible Children, a Non-Governmental Organization based in Northern Uganda that contributed to tracking abducted children during the Lord's Resistance Army War insurgency.

Colline also participated in the TEDx conference in NewYork, advocating internationally fr the victims of the LRA war in northern Uganda.

During the January 2026 elections, she emerged as the winner for the Kyoga Constituency Member of Parliament seat upon leading six male counterparts .

== Personal life ==
She is the co-founder of Far Away Friends, Non-Governmental organisation, empowering young people through health, youth education, cross-cultural engagements, and economic empowerment.

She also co-founded Global Leaders School, an educational institution that has provided 500 children with quality education in Amolatar district.

== See also ==
- Amolatar District
- Moses Okot Jr
- Jimmy Akena
- 12th Parliament of Uganda
- Lord’s Resistance Army
