= Fiona Nakku =

Ugandan politician and Member of Parliament

- Died: 1994
- Citizenship: Uganda
- Occupation: Politician

Fiona Nakku is an elected Female Workers Representative Member of Parliament for the 12th parliament of Uganda. She will be serving in the August house from May 2026 to 2031.

In 2021, she contested for Busia District in the Woman Member of Parliament race, but lost to Hellen Wandera. Nakku served as Principal Coordinator under the Youth for Museveni Movement, a nationwide mobilization initiative launched in 2025 to support His Excellency Yoweri Kaguta Museveni, the re-elected president of Uganda, in his candidacy. She was disqualified as youth MP falsified age

== Early life and education ==
Nakku was born on December 20, 1994, and hails from Bukedi district in Eastern Uganda. She completed her Ordinary level (O-Level) at Kinawa High School in Nakawa in 2010.

== See also ==
- Jesca Ababeku
- Moses Ali
- Charity Lenia
