= Zahara Maala Luyirika =

Ugandan lawyer and politician

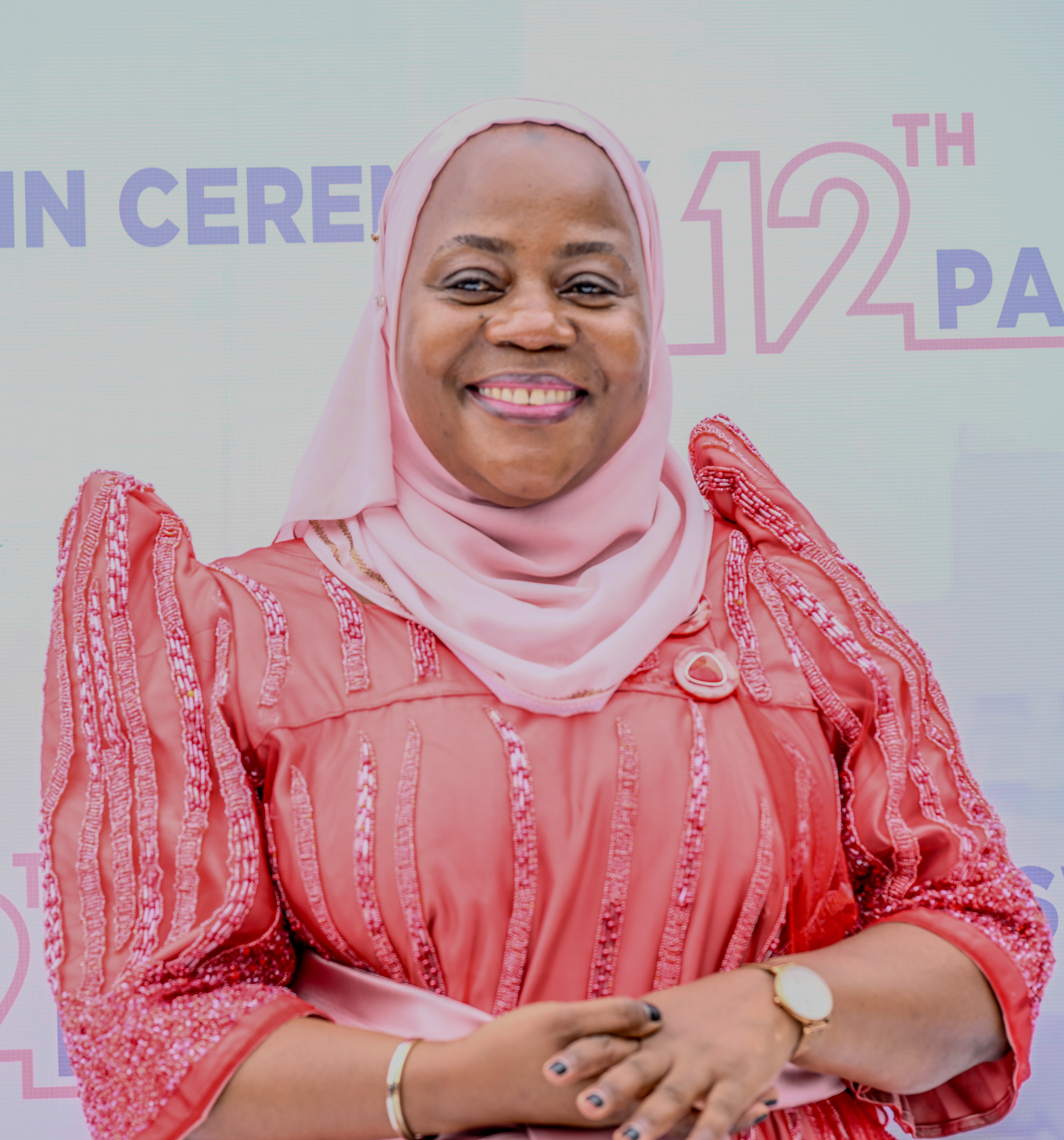
- Zahara Maala Luyirika

Member of Parliament for Makindye West
- Incumbent
- Assumed office May 2026
- President: Bobi Wine
- Preceded by: Allan Ssewanyana

Speaker of the Kampala Capital City Authority Council
- In office June 2021 – May 2026
- Preceded by: Abubaker Kawalya
- Succeeded by: John Mary Ssebuwuufu

Personal details
- Born: 1987 (age 38–39) Kampala, Uganda
- Party: National Unity Platform
- Occupation: Lawyer, politician

Zahara Maala Luyirika (born 1987) is a Ugandan lawyer, politician, and activist. She is the Member of Parliament for Makindye West in Kampala District in Uganda’s 12th Parliament. She is the first female Speaker of the Kampala Capital City Authority Council since June 2021 - May 2026.

== Early life and education ==
Zahara Maala Luyirika was born in Kampala, Uganda. She trained as a lawyer and later entered public service and politics.

== Career ==
Luyirika began her political career as a councillor in Makindye, where she became known for grassroots mobilization and advocacy for urban communities.

In June 2021, she was elected Speaker of the Kampala Capital City Authority Council, winning majority support from councillors.

== Parliamentary career ==
In the 2026 general elections, Luyirika contested for the Makindye West parliamentary seat under the National Unity Platform (NUP). She was declared the winner, defeating incumbent Allan Ssewanyana.

She assumed office as Member of Parliament for the 2026–2031 term.

Luyirika won the Makindye West parliamentary seat with 32,264 votes, according to results reported by local media outlets.

== Political affiliation ==
Luyirika is a member of the National Unity Platform (NUP), led by Robert Kyagulanyi Ssentamu.

== Advocacy and policies ==
She has advocated for improved sanitation, waste management, and better service delivery in Kampala, alongside youth and women empowerment initiatives.

== Controversies ==
In 2025, a viral image falsely claimed that Luyirika endorsed President Yoweri Museveni. Independent fact-checkers later confirmed that the claim was false.
