= Jeniva Arinaitwe =

Ugandan politician

Woman Member of Parliament for Rubirizi District
- In office 2026–2031
- Constituency: Rubirizi District

Personal details
- Born: Jeniva Arinaitwe
- Party: National Resistance Movement (NRM)
- Occupation: Politician
- Known for: Elected unopposed as Woman MP for Rubirizi District (2026–2031)

Arinaitwe Jeniva , also known as Nalongo, is a Ugandan politician. She is an elected woman Member of Parliament for Rubirizi District to the 12th Parliament of Uganda (2026–2031).

== Political career ==
During the NRM(National Resistance Movement) party primaries, she contested for the Rubirizi District parliamentary seat and won with 27,653 votes earning the party's flag bearer position. She then secured the National Resistance Movement (NRM) party flag. She was elected unopposed in the 2026 Ugandan general election.

== See also ==
- Parliament of Uganda
- List of members of the twelfth Parliament of Uganda
- Rubirizi District
- National Resistance Movement
- Ugandan politics
- Misi Kabanda
- Margaret Rwebyambu
- Charity Lenia
