= Babungi Josephine Bebona =

Ugandan politician

Babungi Josephine Bebona also known as Josephine Babungi Bebona is a Ugandan midwife and woman Member of Parliament for Bundibugyo District as of March 2021 in the 11th parliament of Uganda. She is politically affiliated to the National Resistance Movement (NRM) and she has been in the Ugandan parliament since 2016.

== Early life and education ==
Hon. Bebona Josephine Babungi
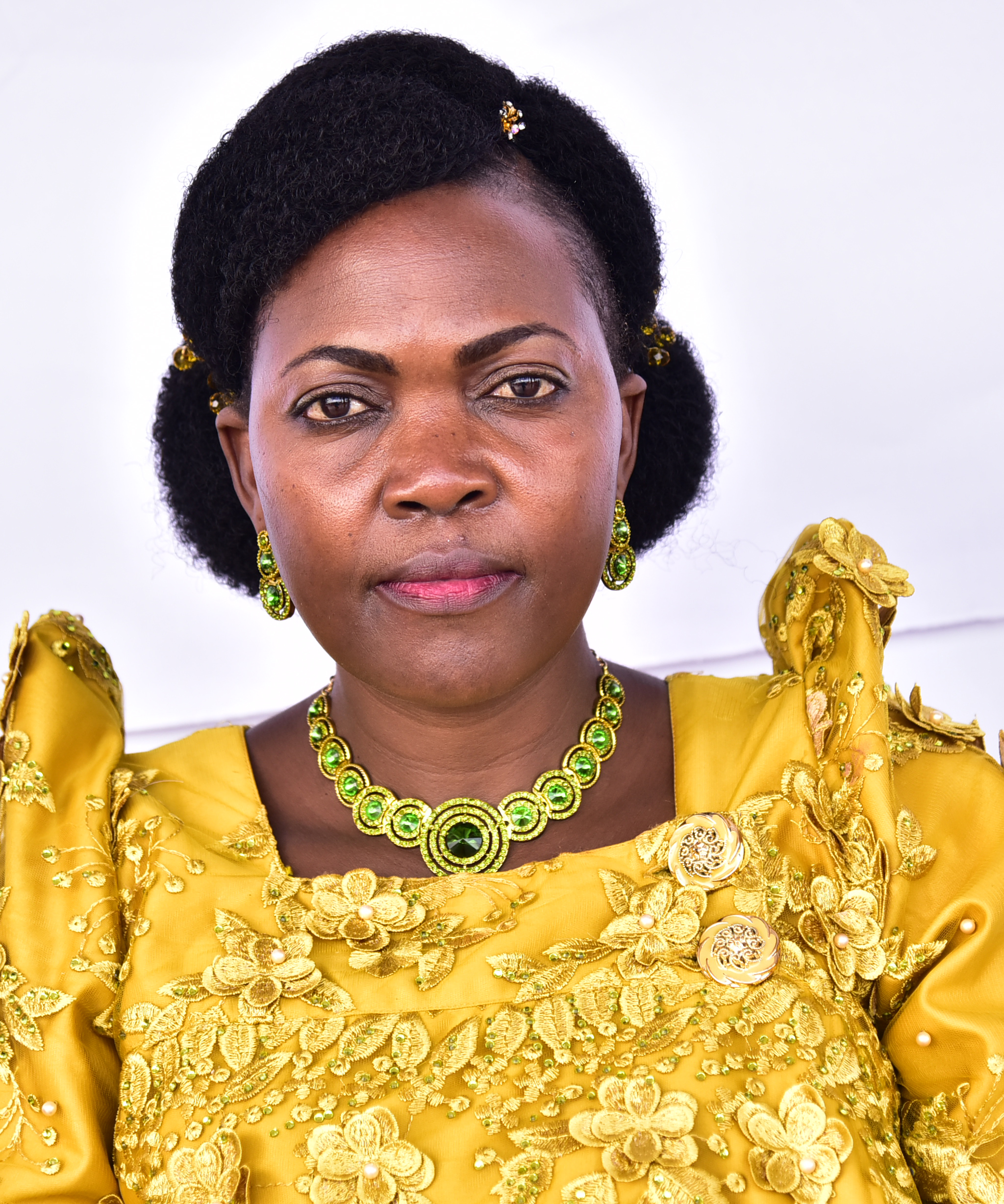
- Born: January 6, 1973 (age 53); Bundibugyo District, Western Region, Uganda
- Other name: Josephine Babungi Bebona
- Citizenship: Ugandan
- Education: Kabale School of Nursing and Midwifery; * Rubaga School of Nursing and Midwifery
- Occupations: Midwife, Public Health Officer, Politician
- Years active: 1999–present
- Employer: Parliament of Uganda
- Known for: Woman Member of Parliament for Bundibugyo District
- Title: Woman Member of Parliament for Bundibugyo District
- Political party: National Resistance Movement (NRM)

Babungi Josephine Bebona was born on 06-Jan-1973 in Bundibugyo District in the Western Region of Uganda, which is bordering the Democratic Republic of the Congo. She attended Semuliki High School in Bundibugyo where she finished her High School Education in 1989. She obtained a Certificate of Enrolled Midwifery in 1997 from Kabale School of Nursing and Midwifery. In 2004, Babungi Josephine Bebona obtained a Certificate of Registration in Midwifery from Rubaga School of Nursing and Midwifery.

== Career ==
Babungi Josephine Bebona was an enrolled midwife from 1999 to 2003. She became a Nursing Officer in Bundibugyo District Local Government from 2005 to 2016. She is currently serving as the woman Member of Parliament for Bundibugyo District since 2016 up to date.

Apart from her Parliamentary duties, she has also sat on some committees which: Committee on HIV/AIDS & Related Disease as a Member and also the Committee on Health as a member.

== Other contributions ==
She helped in the settling of the tribal differences between the Bakonjo and the Bamba in Bundibugyo District. She participated in distributing of relief to flash floods affected families in Bundibugyo in conjunction with the Uganda Red Cross Society and the Ugandan Government in 2019 and also, she requested the Office of the Prime Minister of Uganda to include Bundibugyo District in the relocation plan since the district suffers the same disaster every year. She also participated in the age limit debate but she remained undecided by the time the debate was concluded in 2017. Babungi Josephine Bebona initiated the women's skills development project which was intended to help people with disabilities (PWDs) which was later launched by the Speaker of the parliament of Uganda in 2018.

She has been a member of Committee on HIV/AIDS and Related Matter where she managed to obtain a score of 67.86. She has been involved in a number of projects which include buying Mattresses to Grade 1 P.L.E Pupils, gave A Diabetes Machine to Dr. Bukombi Of Kikyo Health Center And Bundibugyo Hospital, supplied Goats and Cows to Some Farmers, gave 30 Plastic Seats And 1,000,000UGX To Mijosa Group.

== See also ==
- List of members of the eleventh Parliament of Uganda
- Bundibugyo District
- National Resistance Movement
- Parliament of Uganda
- Member of Parliament
- Richard Gafabusa
- Christopher Kibanzanga
