= Teddy Nambooze =

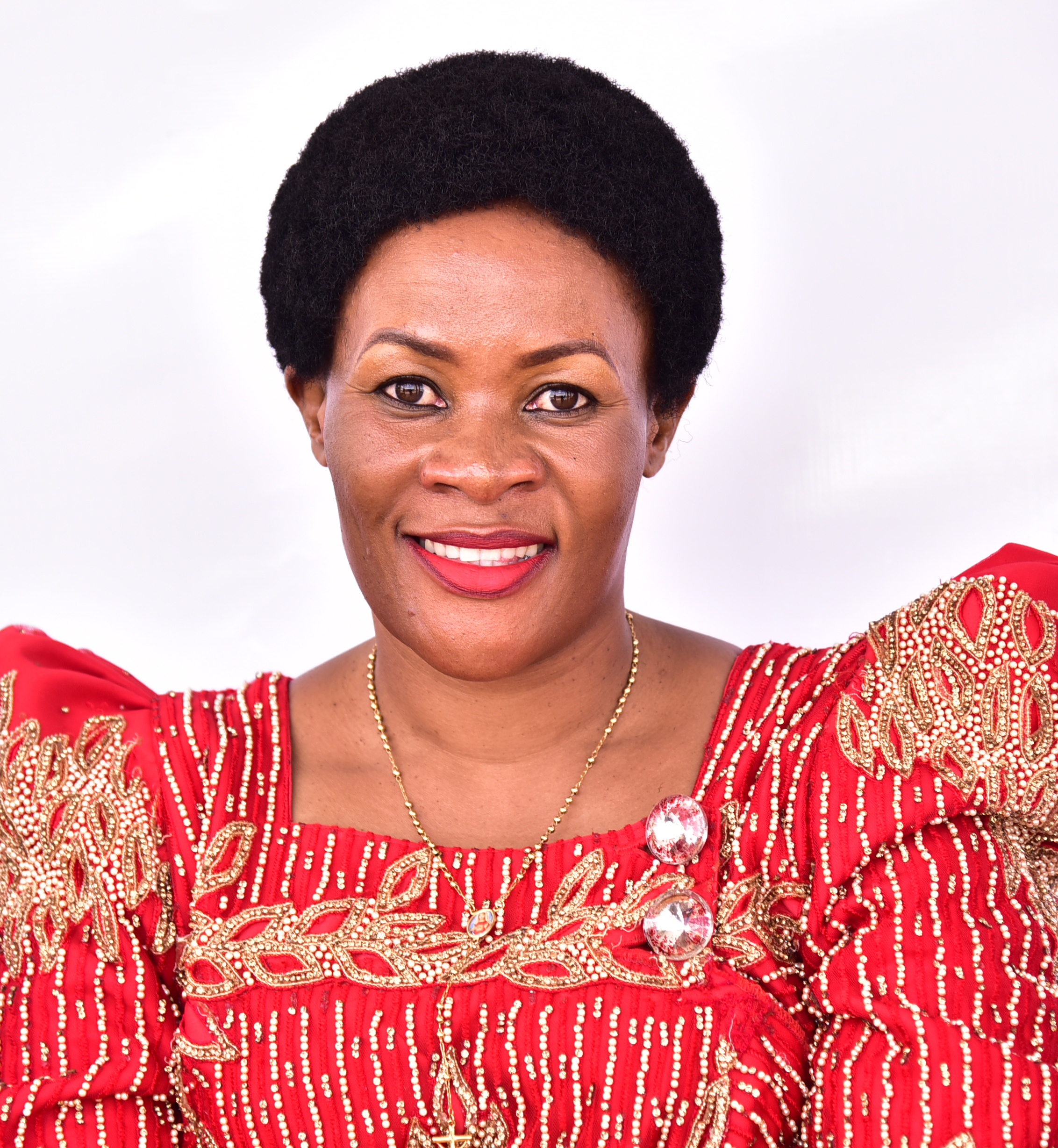
Nambooze Teddy

Teddy Nambooze is a Ugandan politician and accountant. She is serving as the woman member of Parliament for Mpigi district in the twelfth Parliament under the National Unity Platform (NUP).

== Early life and education ==
Nambooze was born in Ggoli, a village in Kammengo sub-county along Kampala-Masaka road in Mpigi district. She attended St. Bruno Secondary School Ggoli in Kammengo sub-county for her high school education. Nambooze studied for a bachelor's degree in business administration at Nkumba University, Entebbe, in Uganda in 2002.

== Career ==
Nambooze worked as a data entry officer at the Ministry of Education before joining the Hunger project in Kalamba sub-county in Butamabala district, the project was intended to teach women in the area financial skills to alleviate poverty. The project set up a SACCO of which she was appointed the manager.

In 2011, Nambooze started up a bank in the names Trust Development Initiative (TRUDI) where she currently serves as the director. In 2016, she contested on the Mpigi district woman MP seat but did not win. In 2021, Nambooze came back to contest on the same position and was victorious. She is currently a legislator in the Parliament of Uganda serving as the woman member of Parliament for Mpigi district. In 2025 Teddy Nambooze was nominated by National Unity Platform to contest as their flag bearer on the Mpigi District woman MP seat. She won and was sworn in on 15 May 2026 as the elected Mpigi District woman MP for the 2026 to 2031 term.

== Extwernal links ==
- Survey: NUP’s Teddy Nambooze leading with 51% in Mpigi Woman MP race
- Ministers Kamuntu, Nabakooba, Kasolo, Tumwesigye trail opponents
