= Jacinta Atuto =

Ugandan politician

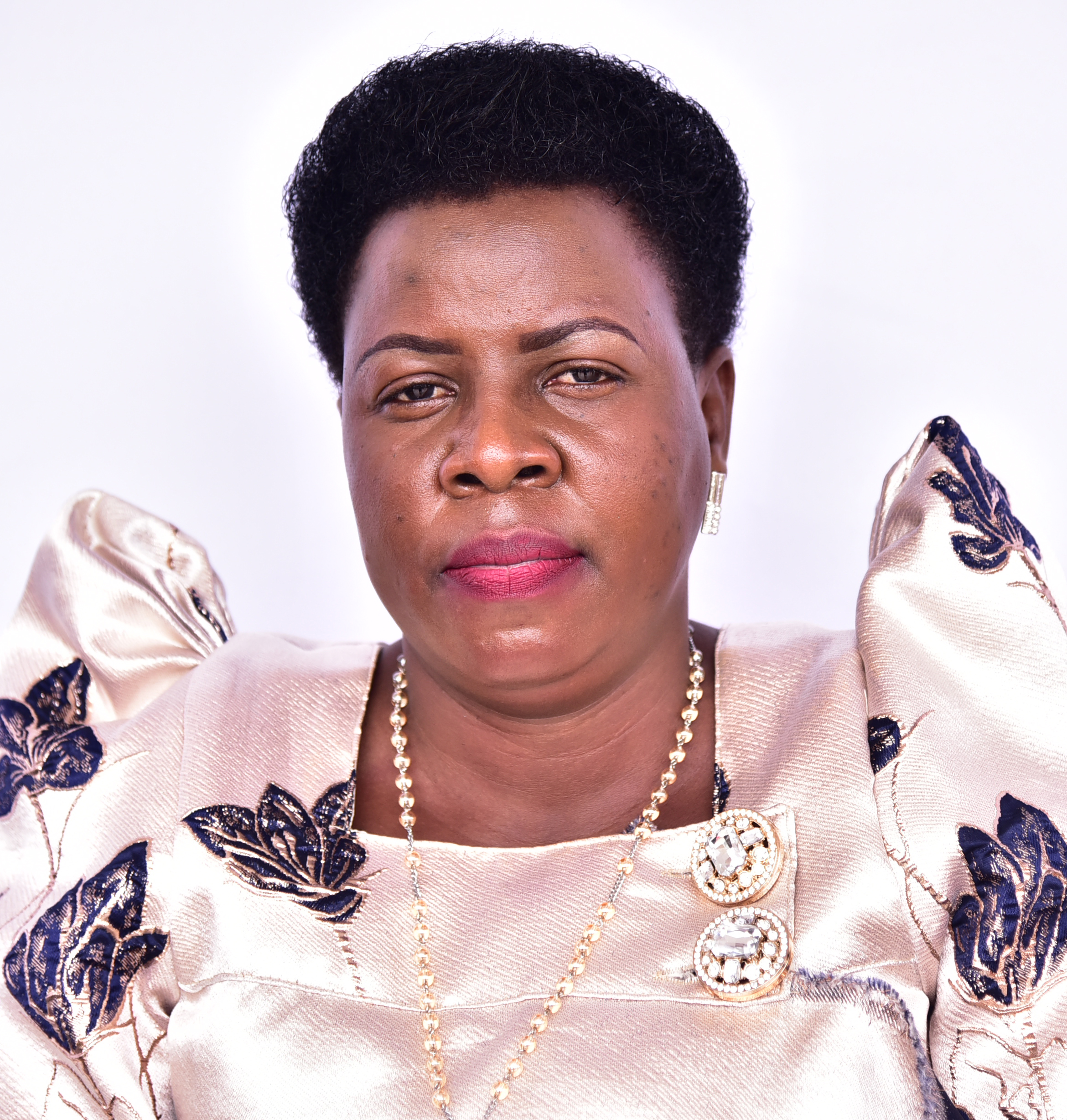
- Occupation: Politician
- Known for: Deputy chairperson for the parliamentary Committee On Climate Change

Jacinta Atuto is a Ugandan politician who serves as a member of parliament for Kapelebyong District in the eleventh parliament of Uganda. She is the deputy chairperson for the parliamentary Committee On Climate Change. She is a member of the National Resistance Movement.

== Other works ==
She donated an ambulance to the people of Kapelebyong.

== Controversies ==
Adupo Florence is a former member of parliament for Kapelebyong District with the Forum for Democratic Change who lost to Atuto, claimed that her votes in the 2021 elections were handed to her rivals who included Atuto, a matter Adupo took to the Soroti Chief Magistrates Court wanting the votes to be re-counted but her vote recount applications were dismissed by Chief Magistrate Monica Amono as they lacked substantial evidence to warrant a vote recount.

== See also ==
1. List of members of the eleventh Parliament of Uganda
2. Sauda Kauma
3. Parliament of Uganda
4. National Resistance Movement
