= Victorious Zawedde =

Ugandan politician

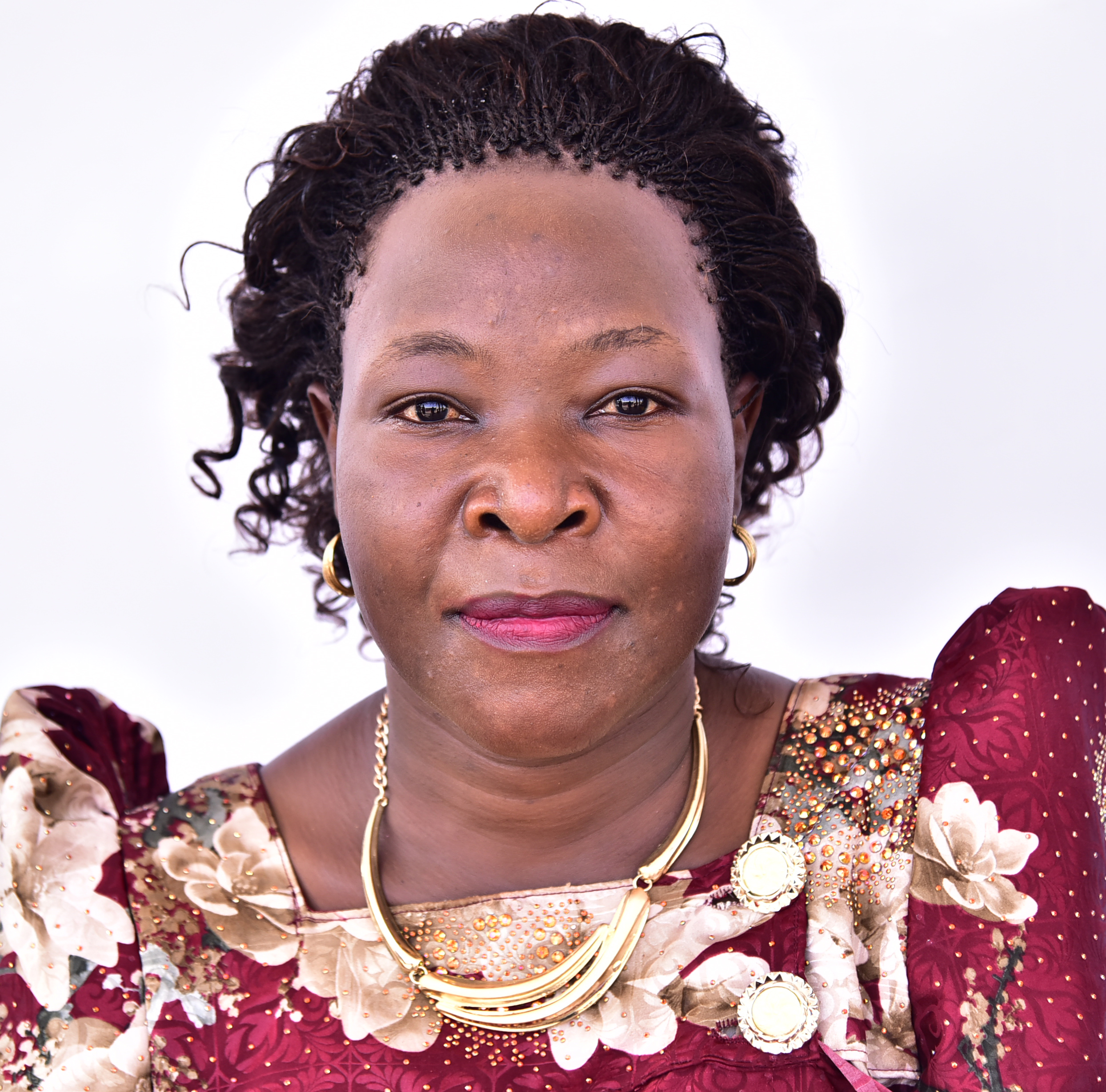
- Born: January 26, 1987
- Citizenship: Ugandan
- Occupations: Social worker, politician
- Known for: Politics
- Office: Member of Parliament of Uganda
- Political party: Independent

Victorious Zawedde is a Ugandan politician and member of the Parliament. She was elected in office as a woman Member to represent Nakasongola district located in the Central region of Uganda during the 2021 Uganda general elections.

She contested as an independent candidate.

== Political career ==
=== Election to Parliament ===
Zawedde was nominated to contest for the Nakasongola District Woman Representative seat in the 2021 parliamentary elections as an independent candidate, according to the Electoral Commission’s nominated-candidates list.

The Electoral Commission’s 2020–2021 report lists Zawedde as the winner for Nakasongola District Woman Representative, with 28,325 votes.

In July 2025, during primary elections, she gathered 21,466 votes, defeating the National Resistance Movement candidate.

=== Parliamentary roles ===
Zawedde has served on the Parliament of Uganda’s Committee on Health (membership published for July 2024 onward).

== See also ==
- List of members of the eleventh Parliament of Uganda
- Nakasongola District
- Parliament of Uganda
- Member of Parliament
