= George Didi Bhoka =

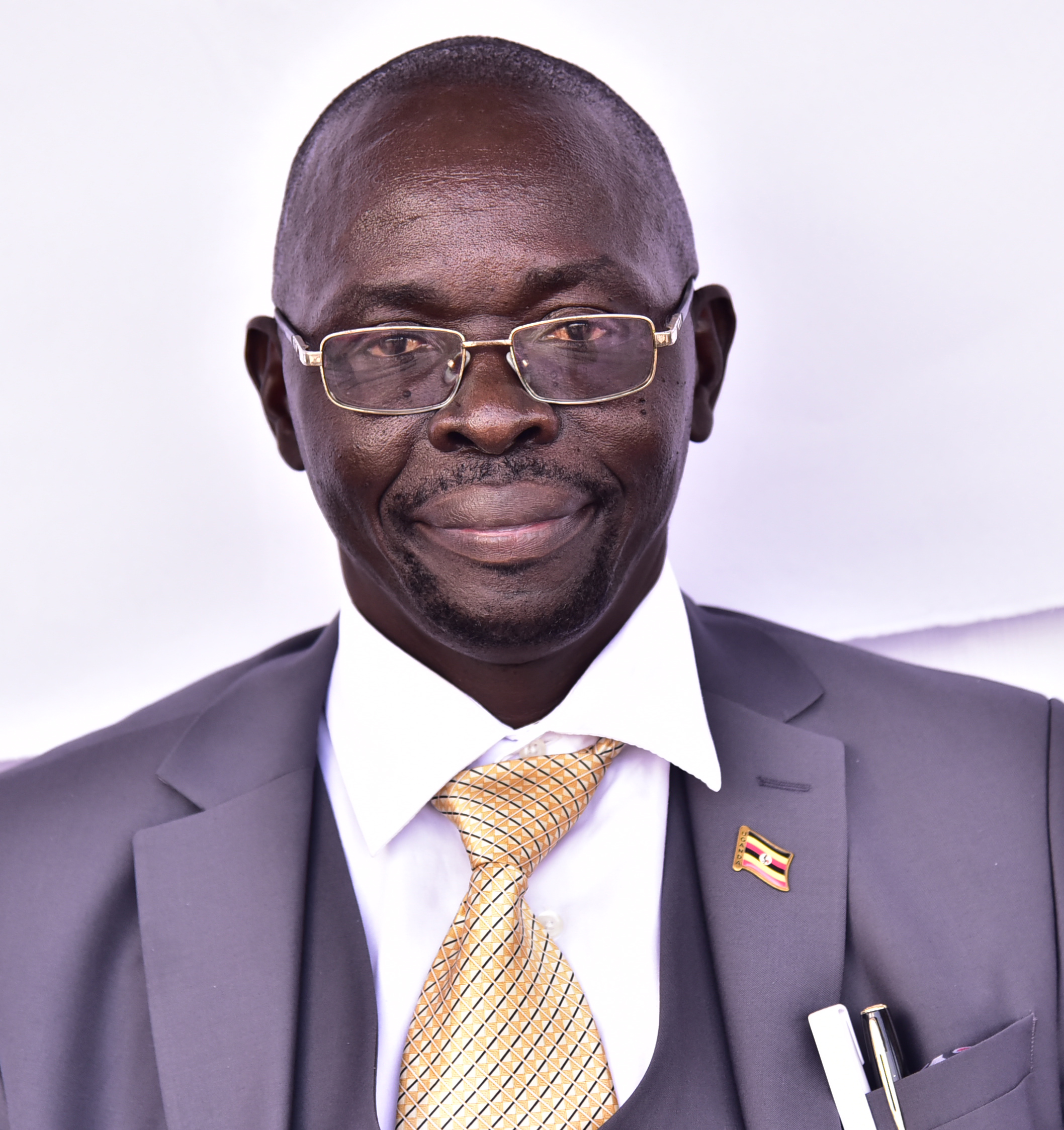
- George Didi Bhoka

Member of Parliament for Obongi County
- Incumbent
- Assumed office 2021

George Didi Bhoka is a Ugandan physician and politician, served as the Member of Parliament for Obongi County in the Parliament of Uganda from 2021 to 2026. He lost in the 2026 Election to Hassan Caps Fungaro who got 8,503 votes as George Didi Bhoka, a candidate from the National Resistance Movement political (NRM) party attains 7,607 votes as per results declared by the returning officer from the Electoral Commission.

== Education ==
Bhoka holds a Bachelor of Medicine and Surgery from Makerere University, a Master of Public Health from the University of Leeds, a Postgraduate Diploma in Business Administration from Heriot-Watt University, and a Certificate in Administrative Law from the Law Development Centre.

== Career ==
Before entering elective politics, Bhoka worked in Uganda’s public health sector. He held positions in district health services, UNICEF Uganda, and Amref Health Africa, where he contributed to health program management and community health initiatives.

== Political career ==
Bhoka was elected as Member of Parliament for Obongi County in the 2021 Ugandan general election. In Parliament, he has been involved in health and social development initiatives, including programs to improve rural healthcare delivery and community awareness on public health issues.

== See Also ==
- Lokii John Baptist
- Evelyn Anite
- Moses Ali
