= David Kalwanga Lukyamuzi =

Ugandan politician and Member of Parliament

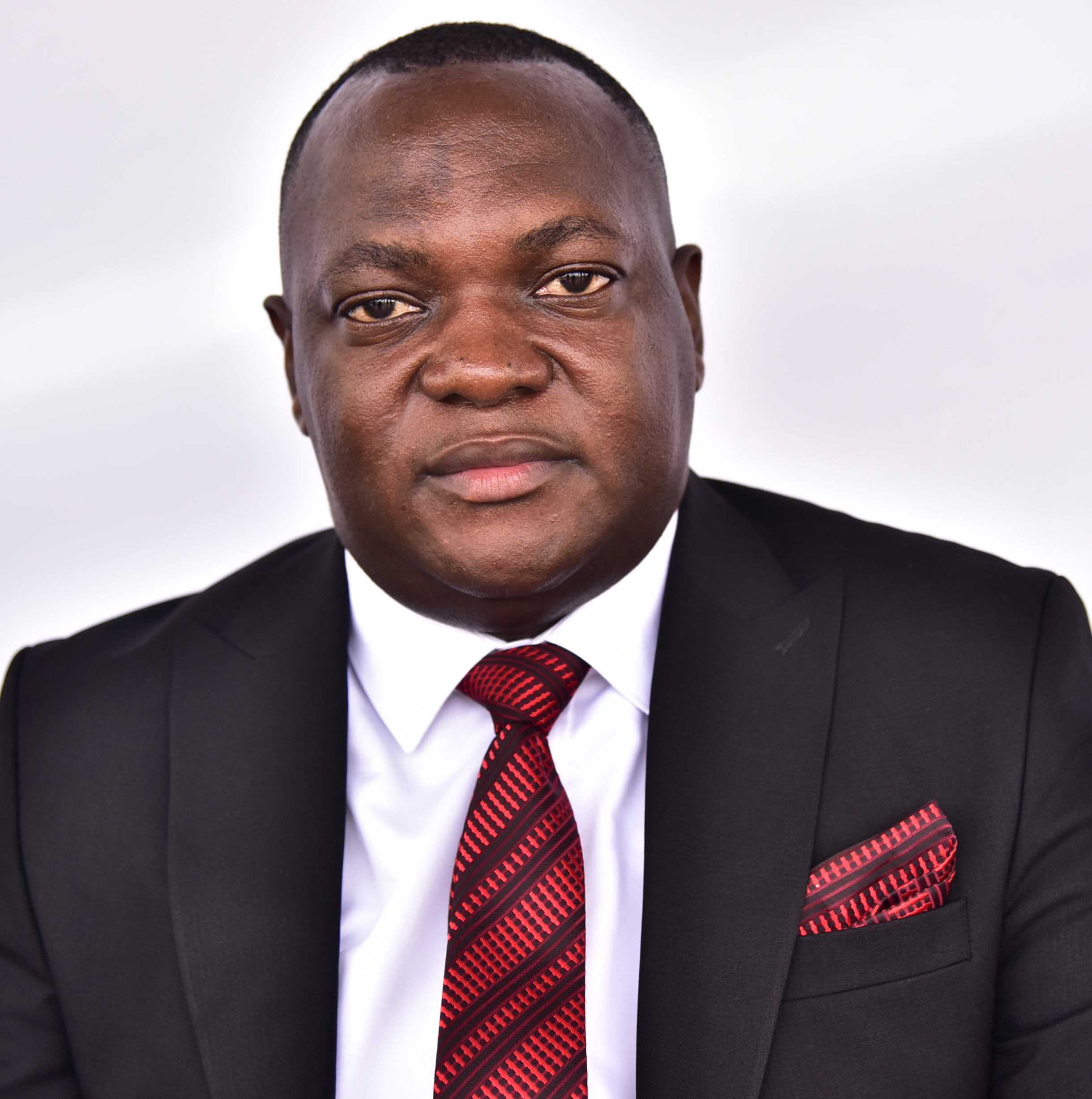
- Lukyamuzi David Kalwanga

Member of Parliament for Busujju County
- Incumbent
- Assumed office 2016

Personal details
- Party: National Unity Platform
- Occupation: Politician

David Kalwanga Lukyamuzi (born in 1979), is a Ugandan politician and Member of Parliament representing Busujju County in the 12th Parliament of Uganda (2026–2031). He was elected in the 2026 general election on the ticket of the National Unity Platform (NUP).

== Political career ==
David Lukyamuzi Kalwanga has been serving as the Member of Parliament for Busujju County in Mityana District since 2016. He was re-elected and officially gazetted for the 2026–2031 term. He previously worked as a teacher.

Kalwanga rose to national prominence in 2017, where he opposed the proposed removal of the presidential age limit. As an independent legislator aligned with the National Resistance Movement (NRM), he criticized the amendment to Article 102(b) of the Constitution, accusing President Yoweri Museveni of attempting to use Parliament to advance personal political interests. His stance brought the number of NRM or NRM-leaning MPs opposing the amendment to 13.

According to District Returning Officer Charles Rebero, Kalwanga of the National Unity Platform won the election with 12,871 votes. His closest competitor, Vincent Nyanzi of the National Resistance Movement, received 11,537 votes.

== See also ==
- List of members of the eleventh Parliament of Uganda
- List of members of the twelfth Parliament of Uganda
- Paul Mwiru
- Rebecca Kadaga
- Francis Zaake
