= Harriet Nakwedde =

Ugandan politician

Woman Member of Parliament for Kayunga District
- Incumbent
- Assumed office 15 January 2026

Personal details
- Born: Busaana Sub‑county, Kayunga District, Uganda
- Party: National Unity Platform
- Spouse: Robert Nangatsa
- Education: Bachelor's Degree in Education (Makerere University); Master's Degree in Human Resource Management (Makerere University Business School)
- Occupation: Politician, Educator
- Known for: Woman Member of Parliament for Kayunga District (12th Parliament)

Harriet Nakwedde also known as Nakwedde Harriet Kafeero, is a Ugandan politician and educator who was elected as the Woman Member of Parliament for Kayunga District on the 15 January general election in the 12th Parliament of Uganda under the National Unity Platform (NUP) political party.

== Early life and educational background ==
Nakwedde was born in Busaana Sub‑county, Kayunga District, Uganda. She attended Nnongo Church of Uganda Primary School and Kyayaye Roman Catholic Primary School. She later attended Busaana Secondary School for her O‑Level studies and Bukoyo Secondary School, Iganga, for her A‑Level education.

Nakwedde attended her study from Makerere University, where she graduated with a Bachelor’s Degree in Education and worked professionally as a teacher. She also holds a Master’s Degree in Human Resource Management from Makerere University Business School.

== Political career ==
Nakwedde first contested for Kayunga District Woman Member of Parliament on the Forum for Democratic Change (FDC) ticket in 2006. She again contested for the Woman MP seat in 2011 but was unsuccessful. In 2016, she became the District Woman Councillor for Kayunga Town Council and Kayunga Subcounty. During the same period (2016–2021), she was appointed Secretary for Education as a member of the District Executive Committee.

Nakwedde also served as the Kayunga District Chairperson of the FDC for 10 years and as Deputy Secretary for Education (National Executive Committee member) for 5 years.

In 2021, she contested for Woman Member of Parliament but lost to the incumbent, Aidah Natamba Erios. Later, she ran for Kayunga LC V Chairperson in a by-election on the NUP ticket, but lost to the National Resistance Movement (NRM) candidate, Andrew Muwonge, on 16 December 2021.

== Personal life ==
Nakwedde is married to Robert Nangatsa with three children and a member of the Inner Wheel Club of Kampala, a member of the Uganda Red Cross Society, and the founder of the Forum for Emancipation to Empowerment Drive (FEED).

== See also ==
- List of members of the twelfth Parliament of Uganda
