= Lillian Obiale Paparu =

Ugandan politician

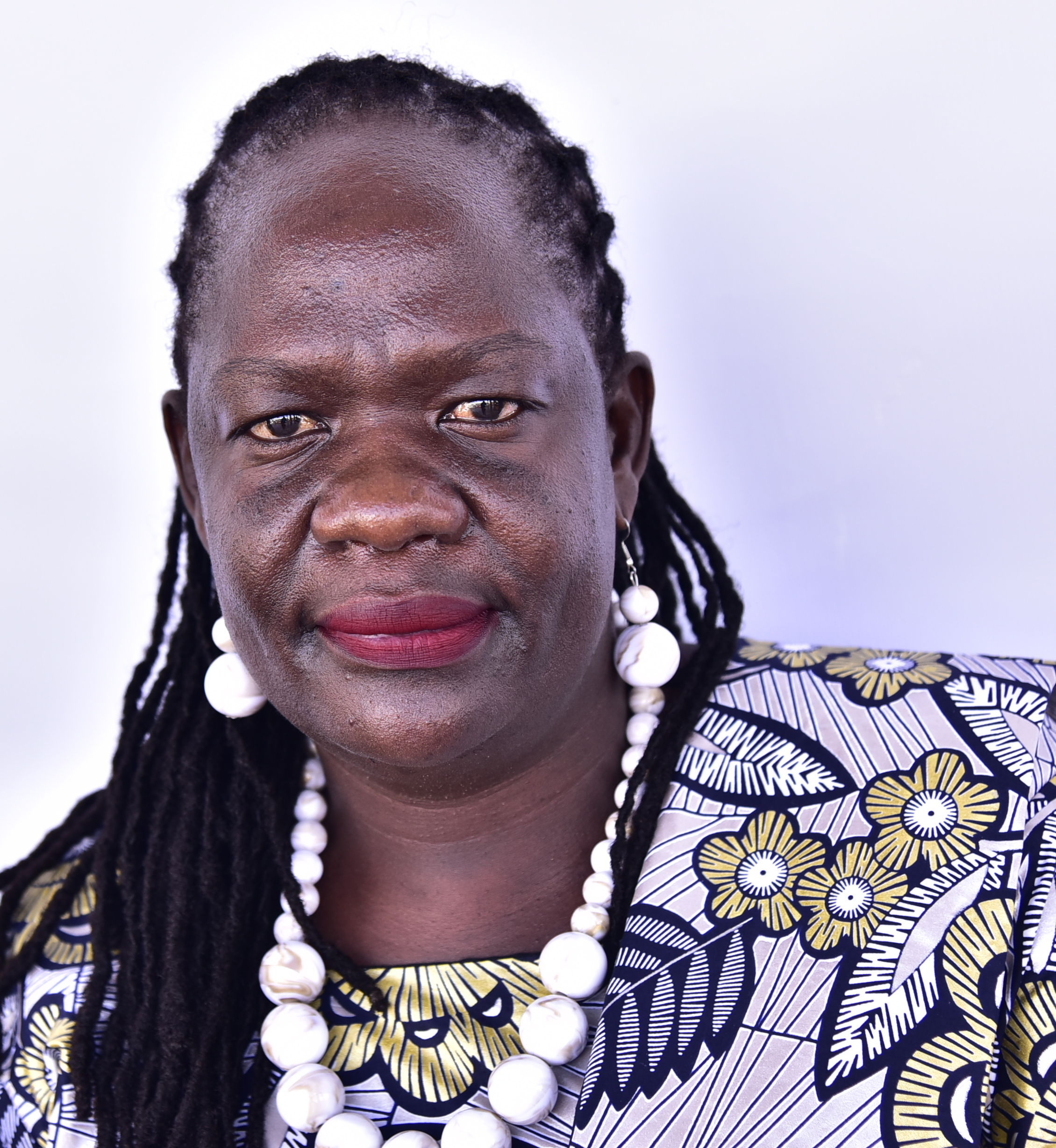

Member of Parliament of Uganda
- Incumbent
- Assumed office 17 May 2021
- Constituency: Arua District

Personal details
- Born: 1978
- Party: National Resistance Movement
- Education: Makerere University

Lillian Obiale Paparu (born 1978) is a Ugandan politician serving as a Member of Parliament in Uganda, representing the Arua District. She is affiliated with the National Resistance Movement (NRM) political party and is a flag bearer In the NRM primary elections, she campaigned against Diana Ayikoru and Immaculate Bako, and then ran unopposed in the general election.

== Early life and education ==
Paparu was born to Col. Nelson and Evelyn Obiale, the second of seven children. A year after, her father was exiled because of the overthrowing of then president Idi Amin. The family moved to the eastern Democratic Republic of Congo (DRC). When she was of age to attend primary school, she returned to Uganda where she lived with her aunt in Opia parish in the Arua District. She attended Opia primary school and then Ekarakafe primary, completing seventh grade in 1994. She attended Ediofe Girls for secondary education, and got her Advanced level certificate.

She attended Makerere University, and received her bachelor's degree in Social Sciences (sociology and political science) in 2002. She got a post-graduate diploma in Education in 2004, and then a Master's in education in 2007.

== Career ==
In 2009, Paparu joined the Community Empowerment for Rural Development (CEFORD) as a program officer and then as the Program Manager for CEFORD. She lectured at Uganda Christian University, Mukono, and later taught at the campus in Arua.

== Personal life ==
Papru is married to Simon Ababo, who works as an administrative officer in the Arua District. They have two children.

== See also ==
- List of members of the eleventh Parliament of Uganda
