= John Bosco Koy Kariisa =

Ugandan politician

Honorable

Personal details
- Born: John Bosco Koy Kariisa Buhweju, Uganda
- Citizenship: Uganda
- Education: Makerere University (Bachelor of Mechanical Engineering)
- Occupation: Engineer, politician
- Known for: Entrepreneurship, politics

John Bosco Koy Kariisa is a Ugandan mechanical Engineer, entrepreneur and politician. He was elected Member of Parliament for Buhweju West Constituency, Buhweju District affiliated to the National Resistance Movement.

== Early life and education ==
John Bosco Koy Kariisa was born in Buhweju District in 1987. He joined St. Joseph's Vocational School in Mbarara in 2000 for both his O-level and A-Level academic qualifications.

Kariisa joined Makerere University for his university education where he graduated in 2009 with a Bachelor of Science in Mechanical Engineering and thereafter a Masters in business administration. He obtained a doctorate from the University of Leeds and is enrolled as an Engineer.

== Career ==
Having finished school, Kariisa was handpicked by then a government Minister and NRM historical John Nasasira and given a job straight away from University as a mechanical engineer. He served in the Ministry of Defence as a Principal Mechanical Engineer before rising ranks into an Assistant Commissioner till his retirement in 2022.

== Politics ==
John Bosco Kariisa was elected the Member of Parliament for Buhweju West Constituency in 2026.

== Family Life ==
John Bosco Koy Kariisa was married to Hon Joy Arinaitwe Karisa, former Woman MP of Buhweju District who passed on in 2013 at the age of 27 and together they had 2 children.

== See also ==
- Buhweju District
- Kigezi region
