= Esther Lucy Acom =

Ugandan politician

- Born: Serere District, Uganda
- Citizenship: Ugandan
- Occupation: Accountant
- Title: Member of Parliament
- Political party: National Resistance Movement

Esther Lucy Acom is a Ugandan certified public accountant, legislator and politician. In 2026, she was elected as the Woman Member of Parliament for Serere District in the Teso sub-region.

== Early life ==
Acom was born in Serere District in the Teso sub-region of Eastern Uganda. Acom built a career in accounting and development work, a development activist and educationist, with a focus on community empowerment, economic development, and improving social services, education and healthcare.

== Career ==
=== Political career ===
In 2025, Acom declared her intention to contest for the Serere District Woman Member of Parliament seat in the 2026 general elections. She initially sought the ticket of the National Resistance Movement (NRM). In the 2025 NRM primaries, Acom contested against incumbent minister Hellen Adoa but lost the party flag bearer position. She subsequently challenged the results, alleging electoral malpractice including voter bribery and irregularities in vote tallying. The NRM tribunal, however, upheld the results.

Acom declared her candidacy as an independent candidate for the 2026 elections, continuing her grassroots mobilisation campaign in Serere District. She was elected Woman Member of Parliament for Serere District, defeated incumbent minister Hellen Adoa.

== See also ==
- Parliament of Uganda
- National Resistance Movement
