= Brenda Namukuta =

Ugandan politician

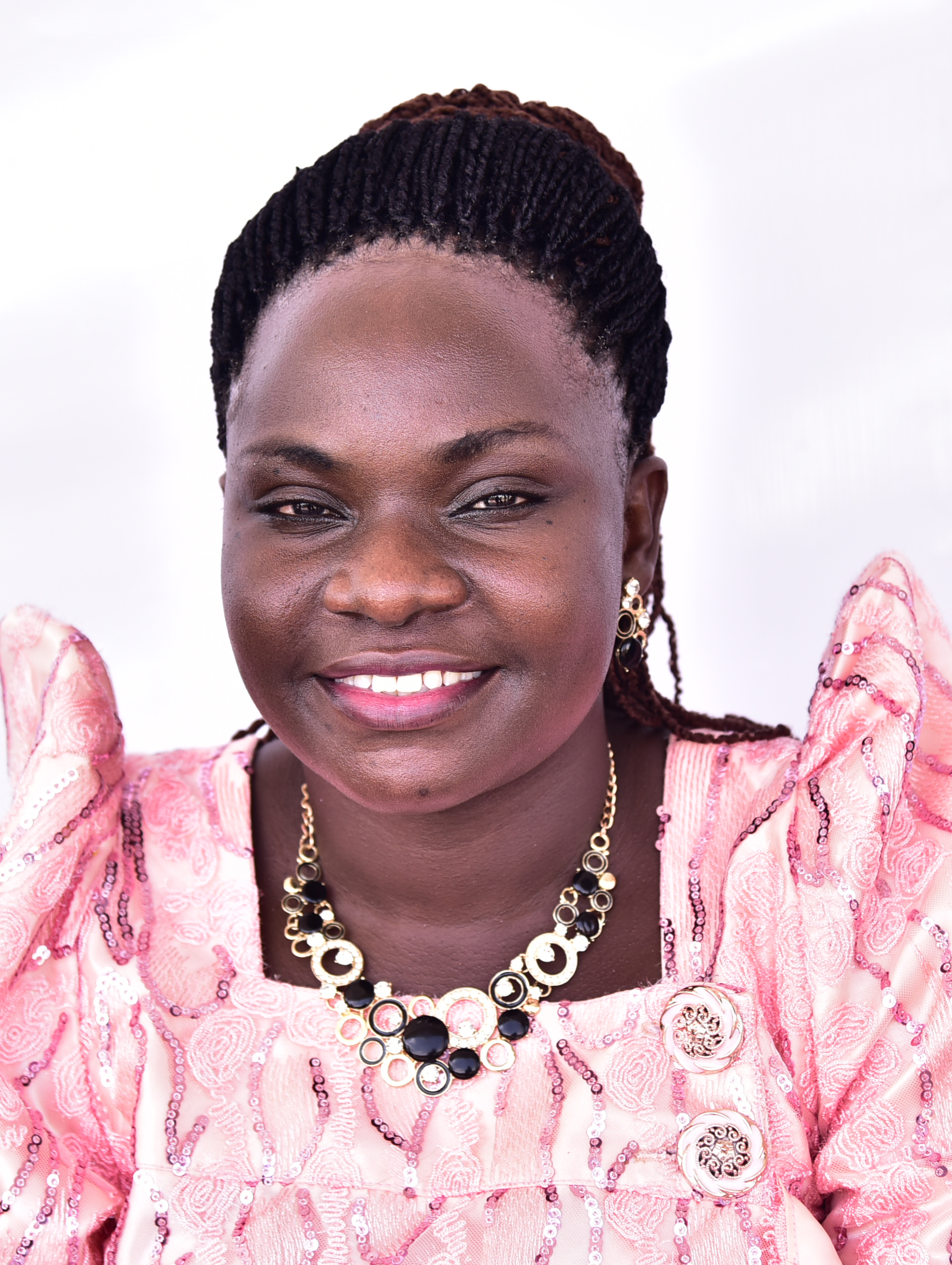
- Namukuta Brenda in 2021

Woman Member of Parliament Kaliro District
- Incumbent
- Assumed office 24 May 2021

Personal details
- Party: National Resistance Movement
- Occupation: Politician, Legislator

Brenda Namukuta is a Ugandan politician, legislator and women representative member of parliament for Kaliro District in the eleventh Parliament of Uganda. She is affiliated to the National Resistance Movement (NRM)

== Career ==
Namukuta was the National Resistance Movement (NRM) flag bearer for Kaliro District. She won the 2021 National elections and became the woman representative member of Parliament for Kaliro district. She sits on the parliamentary budget committee in the eleventh Parliament of Uganda Namukuta serves as the treasurer for the Uganda Women Parliamentary Association (UWOPA). She is treasurer of the Parliamentary Caucus of Busoga sub-region Members of the Parliament of Uganda.

== Other works ==
Namukuta was among the members of the parliamentary budget committee in the eleventh Parliament of Uganda who visited the FUFA headquarters to learn more about the activities FUFA and how the game of football is administered and governed in Uganda.

Namukuta was among the members of parliament from the Busoga region who discussed on the status of roads with in Busoga Sub-region with the Uganda National Roads Authority (UNRA) team which was led by Executive Director Allen Kagina.

== Controversy ==
Namukuta was not among the NRM members of parliament who allegedly received appreciation money of five million Ugandan shillings for voting Anita Among and Thomas Tayebwa during the 2022 speakership race where Anita Among won the election after the death of Jacob Oulanyah. Cissy Namujju a district woman member of parliament for Lwengo District confirmed that she was among those NRM members of parliament who received the money.
