= Kasusu =

Neighborhood in Uganda

- Location in Uganda; Placement on map is approximate
- Coordinates: 00°37′26″N 30°15′25″E
- Country: Uganda
- Region: Western Uganda
- District: Kabarole District
- City: Fort Portal

Government
  - MP: Alex Ruhunda
- Elevation: 4,997 ft (1,523 m)

Kasusu is a neighborhood in the city of Fort Portal, the largest urban center in Kabarole District, in the Western Region of Uganda.

== Location ==
Kasusu lies within the city of Fort Portal, approximately 4 kilometres (2 mi), by road, south of the central business district, along the Fort Portal–Kasese–Mpondwe Road. The geographical coordinates of Kasusu are:0°37'26.0"N, 30°15'25.0"E (Latitude:0.623889; Longitude:30.256944).

== Overview ==
Kasusu is a mixed residential and commercial neighborhood, with emphasis on the commercial side. The area has attracted new developers in the decade between 2010 and 2020. They have constructed new commercial structures, including schools, retail shops, bars, hotels and motels.

Kasusu is considered attractive because of the availability of land for future development, the relatively low population density, compared t other parts of the city, and the low noise levels in the neighborhood.

With Fort Portal destined to become a city in July 2020, the attractiveness of Kasusu is expected to increase as old and new residents' demand for services is expected to increase.

== Points of interest ==
These are some of the points of interest in or near Kasusu:

Virika Hospital, with about 160 beds, lies about halfway between downtown and Kasusu. So is Virika School of Nursing, situated adjacent to the hospital. Uganda Pentecostal University and Uganda Martyrs University maintain campuses further north, but have many employees who reside in Kasusu. Many places of worship, including Virika Roman Catholic Cathedral, Kidukuru Church of Uganda, Kasusu Roman Catholic Church, Rubingo Church of Uganda and others are within walking distance from Kasusu.

Karuzika Palace, the official residence of the King of Toro, one of Uganda's constitutional monarchs, is about three quarters of the way to downtown, west of the Fort Portal–Kasese–Mpondwe Road.

== See also ==
- Fort Portal Regional Referral Hospital
- Mountains of the Moon University
- Nyakasura School
