= Fortunate Nantongo =

Ugandan politician

Hon. Fortunate Nantongo
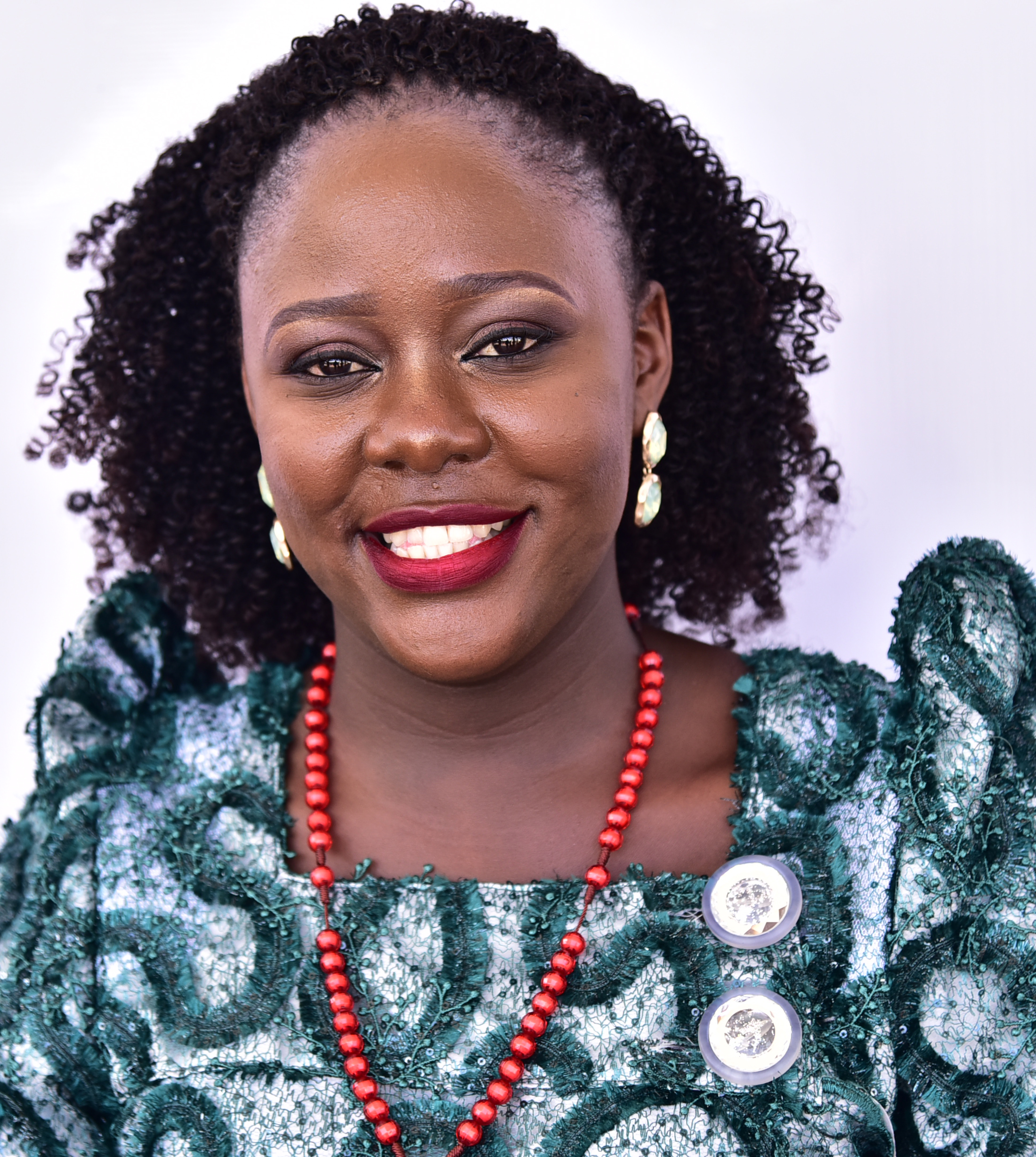

Woman Member of Parliament for Kyotera District
- Incumbent
- Assumed office 2021
- Constituency: Kyotera District

Shadow Minister of Gender, Labor and Social Development
- Incumbent
- Assumed office 2021

Personal details
- Born: 1996 (age 29–30) Kyotera District, Uganda
- Citizenship: Uganda
- Party: Democratic Party (DP)
- Parent: Robinah Nakasirye Ssentongo
- Education: Uganda Christian University; Law Development Centre
- Occupation: Politician, lawyer
- Profession: Lawyer
- Known for: Youngest Woman MP representing Kyotera District; Shadow Minister in opposition
- Committees: Committee on Legal and Parliamentary Affairs; Gender Committee

Fortunate Nantongo (born 1996) is a Ugandan lawyer, politician and legislator. She represents the people of Kyotera District as a member of the Parliament of Uganda. She won the MP seat on the Democratic Party (DP) ticket. She is the Shadow minister of Gender, labor and social development in the opposition government.

== Early life and education ==
Nantongo started her primary studies at Bright grammar primary school Masaka, she thereafter went to Mt. St Mary's college Namagunga for her O'level education and later went to st. Mary's Kitende for her A'level education.

She later pursued a bachelor's degree in law from Uganda Christian University where she graduated in 2018 and added a post graduate diploma in legal practice at the law development center in 2019.

When Nantongo's mum Robinah Nakasirye Ssentongo, the pioneer Woman Mp Kyotera district died unexpectedly in the middle of a campaign on 18 December 2020, due to COVID-19, Nantongo was chosen by DP to replace her.

Nantongo, the second born of her mother and father, lost her mother, father and aunt in a space of 10 days. This encouraged voters to empathize with her and vote her into parliament.

== Career ==
At the time of her mother's death, Nantongo was her political handler. She also managed her mother's finances and did research to help in her parliamentary work and managed projects in the constituency on her behalf.

She was nominated as DP candidate two days after her mum's burial, since the campaign leading to the 2021 general elections had less than a month to end. In the election she garnered 49,019 votes and her closest rival Rachel Nakitende of the National Resistance Movement garnered 26,137 votes.

Nantongo serves on the committee on legal and parliamentary affairs and the gender committee.

== See also ==
- Anita Among
- Thomas Tayebwa
- Joel Senyonyi
