= John Bosco Tumusiime Bamuturaki =

Ugandan politician and military officer

Member of Parliament for Kashari South County
- Incumbent
- Assumed office 2026

Personal details
- Citizenship: Ugandan
- Party: National Resistance Movement

John Bosco Tumusiime Bamuturaki also known as JB Bamuturaki, is a Ugandan retired military officer and politician who serves as the Member of Parliament for Kashari South County, Mbarara District in the 12th parliament.

== Career ==
Bamuturaki began his career by serving in the Uganda People's Defence Forces (UPDF) where he attained the rank of Captain before entering politics.

From 2016 to 2021, he served as the Chairperson of Mbarara District and Chairman of the River Rwizi Catchment Committee. In 2025, he became the NRM flag bearer for Kashari South County and was nominated to contest the parliamentary seat in the 2026 general elections. On 15 January 2026, Bamuturaki won the Kashari South County parliamentary seat and became a Member of Uganda's 12th Parliament.

== See also ==
- Ivan Koreta
- Emma Boona
- Stephen Basaliza
- John Bashaija Kazoora
