= Benson Lugwar =

Benson Lugwar is a Ugandan politician and youth advocate. He was elected as the Member of Parliament for Agago North constituency in the twelfth Parliament of Uganda in the 2026 Ugandan general election, running as an independent candidate.

== Early life and background ==
He is a graduate of the Whitaker Peace and Development Initiative (WPDI) program, he has emerged as a community leader and youth champion, also serving on the Royal Danish Embassy Youth Sounding Board. He has been active in local governance and youth leadership in northern Uganda prior to his election to Parliament.

== Political career ==
Lugwar served as a district councillor in Agago District, where he was involved in youth and community engagement. He championed peace dialogues and agricultural support initiatives among youth groups in the Acholi, Lango, and Karamoja sub-regions. He participated in NRM primaries against John Amos Okot in 2025 for Agago North County. In the 2026 Ugandan general election, Lugwar contested the Agago North parliamentary seat as an independent candidate. He secured 11,837 votes, defeating incumbent John Amos Okot of the National Resistance Movement (NRM) who received 10,918 votes.

== See also ==
- List of members of the twelfth Parliament of Uganda
- Musa Ecweru
- Fred Jalameso
- Denis Obua (politician)
