= Ricky Richard Anywar =

Ugandan former child soldier and politician

Hon. Rick Richard Anywar
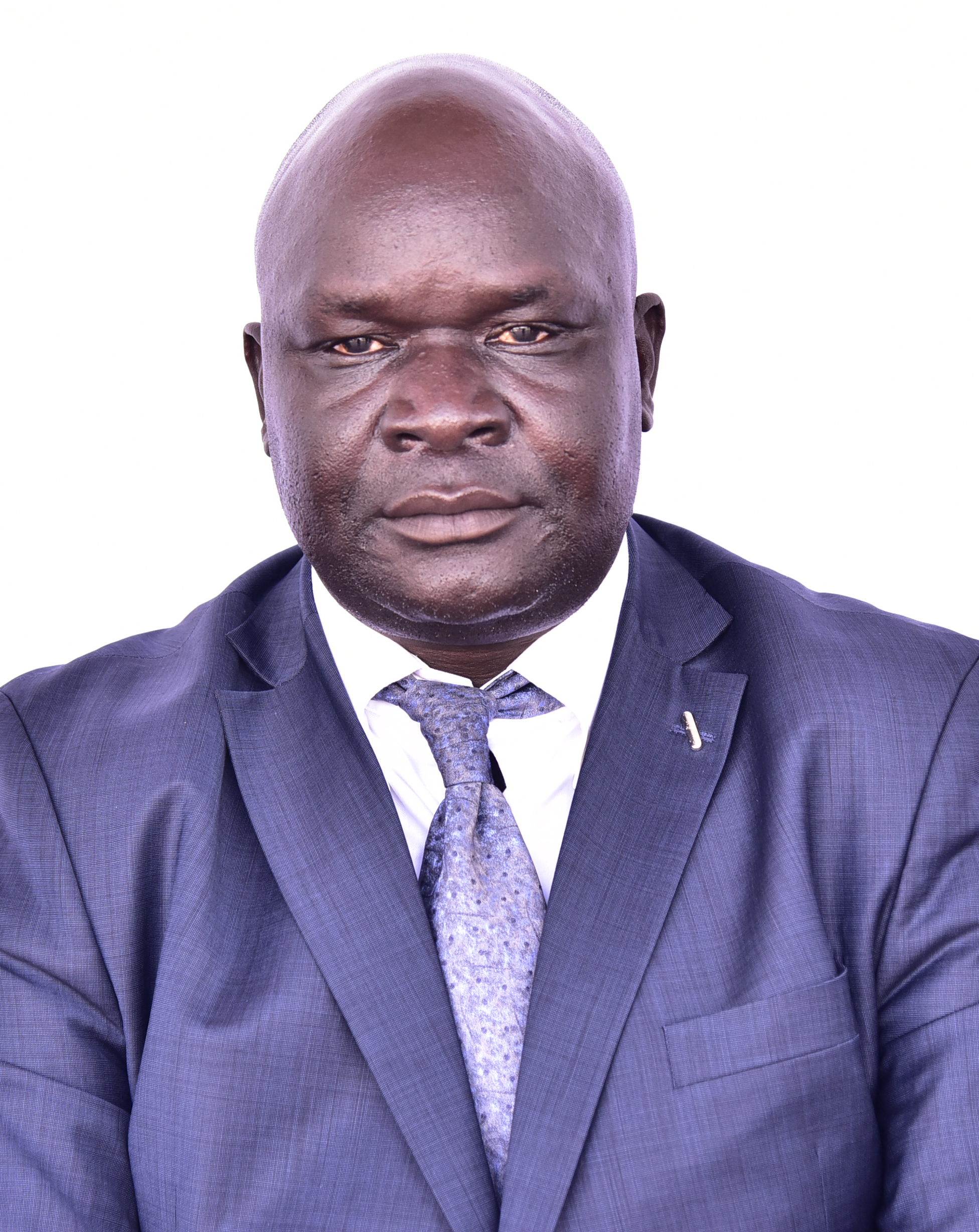

Member of Parliament for Agago West County
- In office 2021–Incumbent

Personal details
- Born: Northern Region, Uganda
- Party: National Resistance Movement
- Occupation: Politician, Humanitarian
- Known for: Founder of Friends of Orphans, former child soldier, humanitarian work

Rick Richard Anywar is a Ugandan politician and former child soldier of the Lord's Resistance Army (LRA) rebel founded by Joseph Kony. Anywar was conscripted at the age of 14 and served in the rebel army for two years before escaping at the age of 16. He was orphaned after his parents were killed by the LRA.

He founded Friends of Orphans (FRO), a nonprofit organisation focusing on reintegrating former child soldiers back to normal life. He is currently a member of the Ugandan Parliament representing Agago West County. He won the 2008 Harriet Tubman Award.

== Early life and education ==
Anywar was raised in Northern Region, Uganda where he was abducted at the age of 14 along with his brother, after other family members, including his parents, were killed during an invasion of their village by the LRA forces. Both Anywar and his brother were forced to fight as child soldiers for two and a half years before they escaped from the rebel group. His brother, who escaped earlier, committed suicide. Anywar was then left a complete orphan and homeless at the age of 16. He was rehabilitated and secured a University degree. After graduation from Kyambogo University, he had a stint in the Ministry of Education before quitting to found Friends of Orphans, a nonprofit organisation focusing on rehabilitating and reintegrating former child soldiers. He currently serves as the Executive Director of the organisation.

== Political career ==
Anywar was elected to the Agago County seat in the 11th Ugandan parliament on the ticket of National Resistance Movement in 2021.

== Media ==
Anywar was featured in the book ''Soldier Boy'' by Keely Hutton published in 2017. The book follows his life story. It begins with his abduction by the LRA and tells his struggle to survive in the army and not lose his brother. The book ends with his eventual escape and the founding of Friends of Orphans. The book also tells a fictional story of a boy named Samuel who is helped by the Friends of Orphans. It has won multiple awards, including Booklist's Top 10 First Novels for Youth 2017, and was the 2018 Children’s Africana Book Award Winner.
