= Ivan Kyeyune =

Ugandan politician and Member of Parliament

Member of Parliament for Nakasongola County
- Incumbent
- Assumed office 2026
- Preceded by: Stephen Tiberondwa Bujjingo

Personal details
- Party: National Unity Platform
- Occupation: Politician, journalist

Ivan Kyeyune is a Ugandan politician, journalist, and Member of Parliament representing Nakasongola County in the 12th Parliament of Uganda (2026–2031). He was elected in the 2026 general election on the ticket of the National Unity Platform (NUP).

== Political career ==
Before entering Parliament, Kyeyune worked as a journalist and television personality with NTV Uganda, where he became widely known for presenting the satirical news segment “Zungulu” on NTV Akawungeezi.

Kyeyune contested the Nakasongola County parliamentary seat several times before eventually winning the position in the 2026 general election. He was declared winner by the Nakasongola District Returning Officer after polling 15,611 votes, defeating National Resistance Movement candidate Stephen Tiberondwa Bujjingo, who received 11,699 votes.
