= Moses Okot Jr =

Ugandan lawyer and politician

Hon Okot Moses Junior Bitek Boran
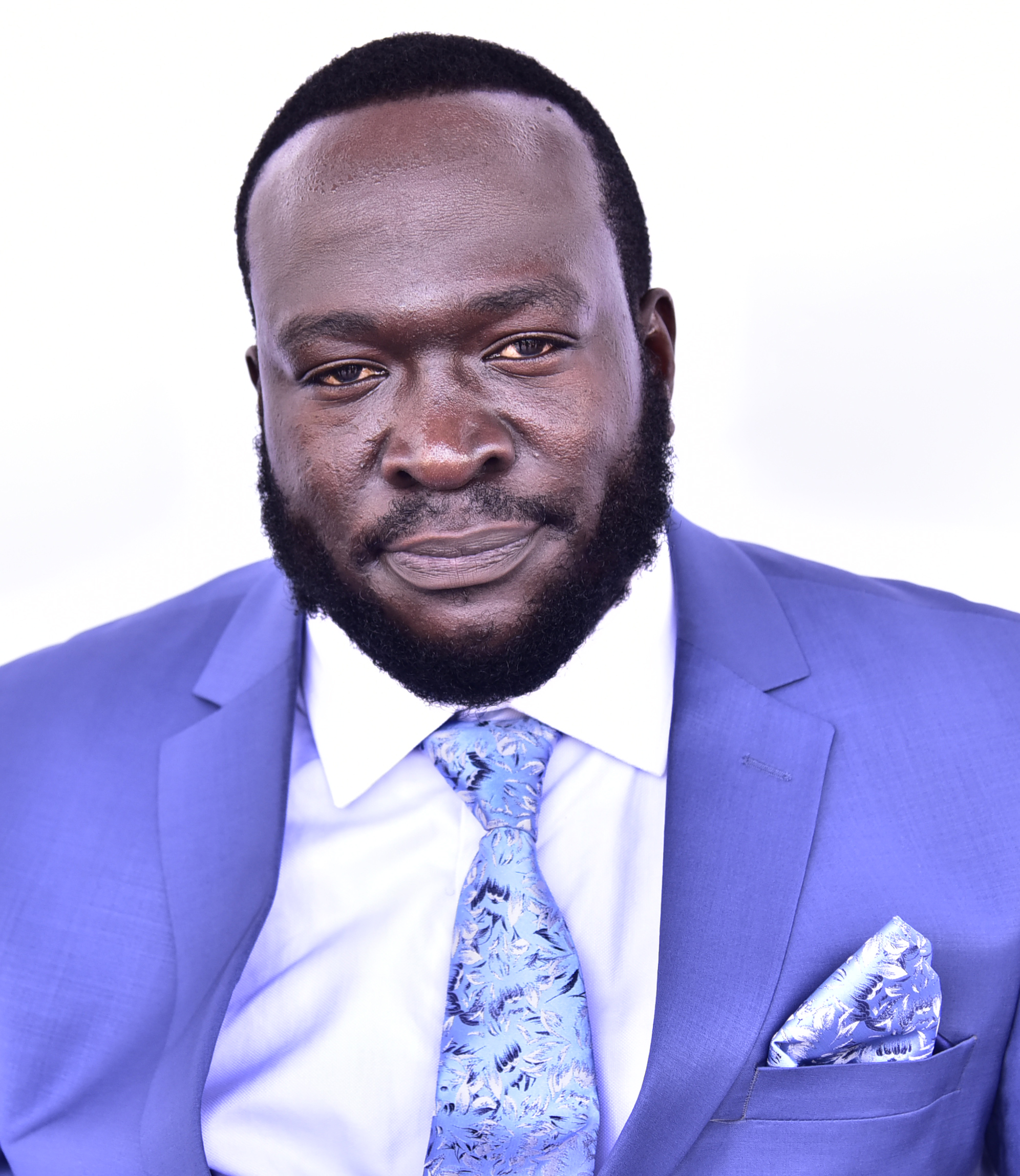
- Hon. Moses Junior Bitek

Member of Parliament for Kioga Constituency Amolatar District
- Incumbent
- Assumed office May 21, 2021

Personal details
- Born: 04 September 1989 (age 37) Amolatar District
- Party: NRM party
- Parent(s): Angiro John(father), Imat Keller Angiro (mother)
- Education: Makerere University (Bachelors of Law); Law Development Centre (Post Graduate Diploma in Legal Practice)
- Occupation: Politician, Public administrator, lawyer
- Known for: Politics, Public Administration, leadership, lawyer, football

Okot Moses Junior Bitek is a Ugandan lawyer and politician who served as a member of Parliament representing Kioga Constituency Amolatar District in the 11th Parliament of Uganda. He was elected on 14 January 2021 under Forum for Democratic Change. He is a member of the National Resistance Movement.

== Early life and background ==
Okot was born in Gulu District to Mr. Angiro John (father) a retired teacher and Miss Imat Keller Angiro (mother) of the Okarowok Clan. Okot attended Amuca SDA Primary School for his PLE, Aputi Secondary School for O-level (2001-2005) and Gombe Secondary School for his A-level (2006-2007). In 2015, Okot graduated with a Bachelor of Laws from Makerere University as well as he received his Diploma in Legal Practice from Law Development Centre in 2017.

== Career ==
=== Working experience ===
While he was at Law Development Centre, Okot served as Guild President from 2016 to 2017. For a period of 3years (2017-2020), Okot Jr was an associate lawyer with Oloya & Company Advocates, a law firm based in Gulu town. He served as a chairperson of the Forum for Democratic Change at Makerere University (2010-2011). Currently, Okot practices with Gem and Company Advocates.

=== Political career ===
In January 2021, he was elected as a Member of Parliament representing Kioga Constituency in Amolatar District in the eleventh Parliament of Uganda (2021 to 2026) in the 2021 Ugandan general election and on 21 May 2021 he sworn in as the Member of Parliament. He won with 8537 votes defeating NRM’s candidate Okello Anthony He is a member on the Human Rights Committee and of the Defense and Internal Affairs since 2021. He serves as the Deputy Chairperson of Lango Parliamentary Caucus since 2021. In May 2022, Okot contested as FDC party's flag bearer in the race for the deputy speaker of the 11th parliament.

He contested for the Kyoga Constituency Member of Parliament in 2025. During the January 2026 elections he lost to Angwech Colline.

== Conflicts ==
Okot was shot on the leg by a Uganda People's Defense Forces (UPDF) soldier while holding a mobilization rally in Amolatar District for People Power.

== Personal life ==
Okot belongs to FDC party.

== External references ==
- Twitter Account for Moses Okot\
- Big Story: CMI arrests FDC MP Moses Okot Bitek
- MPS RESULTS 2021
