= Christopher Kibanzanga =

Ugandan politician

Mbalibulha Taban Christopher Kibanzanga (born 22 January 1967) is a Ugandan politician. He is the State Minister for Agriculture in the Ugandan Cabinet. He was appointed to that position on 6 June 2016, replacing Vincent Ssempijja, who became Cabinet Minister of Agriculture, Animal Industry and Fisheries. As of 2017, Kibanzanga is the serving Member of Parliament representing Bughendera County in Bundibugyo District.

Kibanzanga was first elected to the Parliament of Uganda in 1996. In 2001 he joined Reform Agenda, which later became Forum for Democratic Change, before defecting in August 2015. He has served as the Shadow Minister of Information and National Guidance in the Parliament of Uganda and as Shadow minister for the Presidency and Anti-corruption; in March 2010, he was the acting Leader of the Opposition. He is a Prince of the Kingdom of Rwenzururu.

In 2011, having represented the constituency for ten years, Kibanzanga chose not to stand again in Busongora South and ran instead for the district (LC 5) chairmanship, losing to incumbent Mawa Muhindo. He belongs to National Resistance Movement political party.

== See also ==
- Cabinet of Uganda
- Parliament of Uganda
