= Charity Lenia =

Ugandan politician

Member of Parliament for Vurra County
- In office 2026–2031
- Constituency: Vurra County, Arua District

Personal details
- Born: Uganda
- Party: National Resistance Movement
- Other party: National Unity Platform (former, during university politics)
- Education: Bachelor’s Degree in Procurement and Supply Chain Management (Makerere University Business School)
- Occupation: Politician
- Known for: Member of Parliament for Vurra County (2026–2031)

Charity Lenia also known as Charity Lenia Kevin is a Ugandan politician and the elected direct Member of Parliament for Vurra County, Arua District for the 2026–2031 term in the twelfth parliament of Uganda under the National Resistance Movement political party.

== Education background ==
Charity Lenia attended St. Mary's Secondary School, Namaliga, and later Our Lady of Africa Secondary School, Mukono. She then joined Makerere University Business School (MUBS), where she graduated with a Bachelor's degree in Procurement and Supply Chain Management.

== Political journey ==
Charity Lenia served as Vice Guild President at Makerere University Business School (MUBS) during the 2022/2023 academic year. In 2023, she ran for Guild President at MUBS on the National Unity Platform (NUP) ticket, but did not win the race.

On 5 June 2025, Charity picked nomination forms to contest in the NRM primaries for the Vurra County Member of Parliament seat. She won the National Resistance Movement primary election on 17 July 2025. On 15 January 2026, she was elected Member of Parliament for Vurra County, Arua District on the National Resistance Movement (NRM) ticket.

== See also ==
- List of members of the twelfth Parliament of Uganda
