= Namisindwa District =

- District
- Interactive map of Namisindwa District
- Coordinates: 00°49′N 34°23′E
- Country: Uganda
- Region: Eastern Region
- Sub-region: Bugisu sub-region
- Established: 1 July 2017
- Capital: Namisindwa Town Council

Area
  - Total: 298 km^{2} (115 sq mi)

Population (2024 Census)
  - Total: 257,346
  - Density: 864/km^{2} (2,240/sq mi)
- Time zone: UTC+3 (EAT)
- Website: www.namisindwa.go.ug

Namisindwa District is a district in the Eastern Region of Uganda. The town of Bupoto is the district headquarters.

== Location ==
Namisindwa District is bordered by Bududa District to the north, Kenya to the east and south, Tororo District to the south-west, and Manafwa District to the west. The district headquarters at Bupoto are located approximately 40 kilometres (25 mi), by road, south-east of Mbale, the largest city of in the sub-region.

Namisindwa is also divided in small administrative units which include; county, sub county and parish and discussed below as bases on the UBOS 2024 census data these are the administrative units

=== Bubulo east county ===
- Bubutu - Bumulika, Bumuyonga, Butsemayi, Bukiketi Town Board, and Munamba Town Board.
- Bubutu town council - Bumalanga Ward, Bumandali Ward, Bumusomi Ward, and Busiuma Ward.
- Bukiabi - Bukiabi, Bukokho, Busereli, Makhonge, and Sabino.
- Bukokho - Bukokho, Bunamulingi, Kaboole, and Soono.
- Bumbo - Bumbo, Buwantsala, Buwundu, Chesoma, Kamusayi, and Kisekere.
- Bumbo town council - Bumbo Town Council: Bumbo Ward, Buwantsala Ward, Kamusayi Ward, and Kisekere Ward.
- Bumityero - Bumityero, Bukhabusi, and Bunamulika.
- Bumwoni - Bumwoni, Bukhabusi, and Bupoto.
- Buwambwa - Buwambwa, Bukokho, and Soono.
- Lwakhakha town council - Lwakhakha Ward, Kibuki Ward, and Bunambale Ward.
- Magale - Magale, Bukiabi, and Makhonge.
- Magale town council - Magale Ward, Namugabwe Ward, and Bupoto Ward
- Mukhuyu - Mukhuyu, Bukhaweka, and Buwasunguyi.
- Nabitsikhi - Nabitsikhi, Tsekululu, and Bupoto.
- Namboko - Namboko, Bunamunvule, and Bukhaweka.
- Namitsa - Namitsa, Bupoto, and Bukhaweka

=== Namisindwa county ===
- Bukhabusi - Bukhabusi, Bumakoma, and Bunambale
- Bukhaweka - Bubikala, Bukhaweka, and Bunanganda.
- Bukhaweka town council - Buketera Ward, Bulumba Ward, Bunamakhola Ward, Bunamboko Ward, Khamwando Ward, Kimuma Ward, Matsanza Ward, and Nabumbo Ward.
- Bumumali - Bumumali, Bukibumbi, and Buwagogo.
- Bungati - Bungati, Bunabulubi, and Bupoto
- Bupoto - Bukibumbi, Buwere, and Namisindwa.
- Buwabwala - Buwabwala, Bumusomi, and Bukhaweka
- Buwatuwa - Buwatuwa, Bukhaweka, and Bunamulika.
- Luwa town council - Bulobi Ward, Luwa Ward, and Bunambale Ward.
- Mukoto - Mukoto, Bukhaweka, and Buwasunguyi.
- Namabya - Namabya, Bukhaweka, and Buwasunguyi.
- Namisindwa town council - Buwasiba Ward, Buyaka Ward, Kimundu Ward, and Namisindwa Ward.
- Tsekululu - Tsekululu, Bupoto, and Bukhaweka

== Overview ==
Namisindwa District became operational on 1 July 2017. Prior to that the new district was "East Bubulo County" in Manafwa District. The rationale for creating the new district was (a) to bring services closer to the people and (b) create jobs and reduce youth unemployment.

As of August 2015, the district had 80 schools. The district terrain in described as "hilly", and prone to soil erosion during the rainy season. The gravel roads need frequent maintenance. The Bumbobi–Bubulo–Lwakhakha Road traverses the district in a general northwest to southeast direction.

== Population ==
In 2009, the population of Namisindwa District (Bubulo County East), was estimated at approximately 177,000. In July 2016, the Uganda Bureau of Statistics (UBOS), estimated the district population at approximately 178,746. in 2014 the population was 204,281 and for 2024 was 257,346.

== See also ==
- Bamasaba
- Bugisu sub-region
- Eastern Region, Uganda
- Districts of Uganda
- Parliament of Uganda
