= Fred Jalameso =

Fred Jalameso is a Ugandan politician and educator. He is the Member of Parliament for Ajuri County in Alebtong District, having won the seat in the 2026 parliamentary election as a candidate of the Uganda People's Congress (UPC)

== Early life and education ==
Fred Jalameso is originally from Abwa Village, Angoltok Parish, Abako Sub-county in Alebtong District. Before entering active politics, he worked as a teacher and school administrator. He holds a Master of Business Administration from Lira University and served as head teacher at Light Vocational Secondary School.

== Political career ==
Jalameso joined active politics in 2025 and was elected as the UPC flag bearer for Ajuri County in the party primaries in August 2025

In the 2026 general election, he contested the parliamentary seat for Ajuri County. Preliminary results from the election held on January 15 placed him ahead of Denis Hamson Obua with significant support. However, disputed results in several polling stations led to a partial re-run ordered by the Electoral Commission. In the repeat election held on January 27, 2026, Jalameso was declared the winner with 16,336 votes, narrowly surpassing Obua, who received 15,568 votes.

== See also ==
- List of members of the twelfth Parliament of Uganda
- Denis Obua (politician)
