= Committee on National Economy (Uganda) =

Standing committee of the Parliament of Uganda responsible for economic oversight

- Coat of arms of Uganda

Standing committee overview
- Jurisdiction: Government of Uganda
- Headquarters: Parliament of Uganda, Kampala, Uganda; 0.315°N 32.582°E
- Standing committee executive: Hon. John Bosco Ikojo, Chairperson
- Parent department: Parliament of Uganda
- Website: Official website

The Committee on National Economy is a standing committee of the Parliament of Uganda. It scrutinizes and oversees the national economy, including public borrowing, macroeconomic policy, and financing proposals submitted by the executive and reports its findings and recommendations to the Parliament.

== Mandate ==
Under the Parliament’s Rules of Procedure, the committee reviews, considers, and scrutinizes all matters relating to the national economy. Its remit includes analysis of loan and guarantee requests, evaluation of their terms and impact, monitoring of implementation, and reporting to Parliament. The committee is responsible for reviewing borrowing proposals, assesses macroeconomic implications, and advises the Parliament on economic policy choices.

== Status within Parliament ==
The committee is classified as a standing committee. Standing committees are reconstituted every two and a half years and typically comprise about 30 members selected by party whips.

== Membership and leadership ==
The Parliament maintains an official roster of members and leadership for the committee. Recent listings identify John Bosco Ikojo as chairperson, with other members drawn from multiple parties and regions. The Parliament’s site also hosts the current membership list as a downloadable attachment. NRM (34) NUP (3) FDC (4) DP (2) UPC (1) Independents (9) = 53 members

Party-wise membership of Committee on National Economy (2024–2026)
1. NRM (66.0%)
2. Independents (17.0%)
3. FDC (7.55%)
4. NUP (5.66%)
5. DP (3.77%)

Membership of the Committee on National Economy (January 2024 – May 2026)
Photo	Name	Constituency	Party
	John Bosco Ikojo	Bukedea County	NRM
	Migadde Robert Ndugwa	Buvuma Islands County	NRM
	Tibasiimwa Joram Ruranga	Older Persons’ Rep.	NRM
	Opolot Simon Peter	Kanyum County	NRM
	Ayoo Tonny	Kwania County	NRM
	Katali Loy	DWR, Jinja	NRM
	Avur Jane Pacuto	DWR, Pakwach	NRM
	Baba James Boliba	Koboko County	NRM
	Mutiwa Geofrey Eric	Bunyole County West	NRM
	Chelain Betty Louke	DWR, Amudat	NRM
	Byanyima Nathan	Bukanga County North	NRM
	Lolem Micah Akasile	Upe County	NRM
	Twinomujuni Francis Kazini	Buhaguzi County	NRM
	Waako Peggy Joy	Older Persons’ Rep.	NRM
	Agaba Aisa	Bugangaizi County East	NRM
	Natukunda Midius	DWR, Rukungiri	NRM
	Lochap Peterkhen	Bokora County East	NRM
	Ayoo Jennifer Nalukwago	DWR, Kalaki	NRM
	Awich Jane	DWR, Kaberamaido	NRM
	Atyang Stella	DWR, Moroto	NRM
	Lokwang Hillary	Iki County	NRM
	Komol Joseph Midi	Dodoth County North	NRM
	Byarugaba Alex Bakunda	Isingiro County South	NRM
	Kibaaju Naome	Sheema County North	NRM
	Ogwal Moses Goli	Dokolo County North	NRM
	Achayo Juliet Lodou	Ngora County	NRM
	Wokorach Simon Peter	Aswa County	NRM
	Lubega Bashir Ssempa	Mubende Municipality	NRM
	Taaka Agnes	DWR, Bugiri	NRM
	Awas Sylvia Vicky	DWR, Nabilatuk	NRM
	Kibalya Henry Maurice	Bugabula County South	NRM
	Katwesigye Oliver Koyekyenga	DWR, Buhweju	NRM
	Kajwengye Wilson	Nyabushozi County	NRM
	Chemaswet Abdi Fadhil	Kisos Soi County	NRM
	Kitutu Mary Goretti	DWR, Manafwa	NRM
	Kabataazi Francis Katongole	Kalungu County East	NUP
	Kirumira Hassan	Katikamu County South	NUP
	Tebandeke Charles	Bbaale County	NUP
	Kamara Nicholas Thaddeus	Kabale Municipality	FDC
	Oguzu Lee Denis	Maracha County	FDC
	Isodo Stella Apolot	DWR, Ngora	FDC
	Ebwalu Jonathan	Soroti West Division	FDC
	Okot Peter	Tochi County	DP
	Lukwago John Paul Mpalanyi	Kyotera County	DP
	Akena James Jimmy	Lira East Division	Independents
	Were Godfrey Odero	Samia Bugwe County South	Independents
	Atugonza Allan	Buliisa County	Independents
	Macho Geofrey	Busia Municipality	Independents
	Acora Nancy	DWR, Lamwo	Independents
	Nsereko Muhammad	Kampala Central Division	Independents
	Zijjan David Livingstone	Butembe County	Independents
	Nandutu Agnes	DWR, Bududa	Independents
	Omoding Emmanuel	Serere County	Independents

== Activities ==
The committee routinely considers government borrowing and related economic measures. In September 2025 it called for a review of a proposed €183.3 million loan for water and sanitation and an associated domestic Treasury Bill, after examining terms and project design. The next day Parliament adopted the borrowing proposal.

Uganda’s public debt has grown steadily over recent years, driven by external financing for infrastructure and increasing domestic borrowing, according to the Bank of Uganda’s State of the Economy Report. The Ministry of Finance, Planning and Economic Development reports that public debt rose during the 2023–2024 and 2024–2025 financial periods, with Treasury bonds and Treasury bills contributing significantly to the domestic debt portfolio. Under Rule 184 of the Rules of Procedure of the Parliament of Uganda, all government loan and guarantee requests must be referred to the Committee on National Economy, which assesses their economic implications before they are considered by the House.

== Legal framework ==
The committee operates under the Rules of Procedure of the Parliament of Uganda, issued under article 94 of the Constitution. The rules set out the establishment, composition, and functions of standing committees, including the Committee on National Economy. Updated instruments and consolidated rulebooks are published by Parliament and in Uganda’s legal information repositories.

== See also ==
- Parliament of Uganda
- Public Accounts Committee (Uganda)
