= Geoffrey Macho =

Ugandan politician

Geofrey Macho

Member of Parliament of Uganda from Busia Municipality
- Incumbent
- Assumed office 2016
- Preceded by: Kevinah Taaka

Personal details
- Born: October 12, 1973 (age 52)
- Party: Independent

Geoffrey Mangen Macho (born October 12, 1973) is a Ugandan teacher, politician and former member of the eleventh parliament who represented Busia Municipality as an independent politician.

He is the chairperson of the parliamentary forum on mental health.

== Early life and education ==
Macho lost both parents at a tender age which shaped his political life.

== Political career ==
Macho was elected to the Parliament on the ticket of National Resistance Movement after defeating the pioneer and incumbent MP Kevinah Taaka of the FDC party in 2016. He served on the parliamentary committees of Science and Technology, Trade and Tourism and Equal Opportunities in the 10th parliament. He was one of the 20 NRM parliamentary caucus who voted to retain age limit for president in the constitution against his party's directive to vote for the removal of presidential age limit to allow President Yoweri Museveni continue in office. In September 2020, he lost the ticket of the NRM for re-election to the parliament with a score of 2,389 to Hassan Kamba's 3,005. Macho then ran as an independent candidate backed by a faction of the FDC who felt marginalised during their party's primary election. Macho won with the support of FDC members and his improved popularity following his vote against presidential age limit removal from the constitution.

During his tenure as the chairperson for the Mental Health Parliamentary Committee, he has advocated for the sufficient funding of mental health programs in the country since they affect all the sectors of the economy.

In 2025 National Resistance Movement primary elections, he lost the party flag for Busia Municipality to Ismail Sowedi Mulemya which propelled him to withdraw from the MP race ahead of 2026 elections. Before withdrawing from the race, his challengers accused him for failure to execute his oversight role which led to substandard work and poor service delivery in his constituency.

== Parliamentary activities ==
As an MP, Macho has taken part in several parliamentary debates and initiatives: He has been a vocal advocate on infrastructure and service delivery within Busia Municipality including support for cross-boarder market construction, road tarmacking under the Uganda Support to Municipal Infrastructure Development (USMID) programme and World Bank-funded water projects.

He has raised parliamentary oversight concerns such as, calling for a forensic audit of the Uganda Police SACCO (Exodus) and urging clarification on financial accountability before supporting motions such as a censure proceedings.

== Mental health advocacy ==
Macho serves as Chairperson of the Parliamentary Forum on Mental Health. In this capacity he has called for reinstatement of mental health wards in hospitals, improved access to counseling services in schools and universities and legislative protections for borrowers from microfinance institutions linking meantal health challenges to broader social and economic stressors.

== Notable incidents ==
In March 2020, Macho was arrested after leading market vendors in Busia Municipality in an attempt to defy COVID-19 restrictions imposed on a key border market. Police detained him for allegedly inciting vendors to reopen without government authorization. He was taken to Tororo central police station for questioning.

== 2026 election development ==
Ahead of the 2026 Parliamentary elections, Macho withdrew from the race for the Busia Municipality seat after losing the NRM party primaries to Sowedi Mulemya. Rather tha contest the election as an independent, he chose to step aside and focus on his business interests, including schools and hospitals according to local sources.

== See also ==
- Mulimba John
- Julius Achon
- Agnes Acibu
- Nancy Acora
- Anna Ebaju Adeke
- Hellen Adoa
- Yovan Adriko
- Esther Afoyochan
- Aisa Black Agaba
