= Komakech =

Komakech is a Ugandan surname. Notable people with the name are:

- Christopher Komakech (born 1985), politician
- Jack Komakech (born 2002), professional football player
- Richard Komakech (died 1994), mass murderer; perpetrator of the Kampala wedding massacre
