= Ministry for Karamoja Affairs (Uganda) =

Government ministry of Uganda

Coordinates: 00°18′58″N 32°35′11″E

- Coat of Arms of Uganda

Ministry overview
- Type: Ministry
- Jurisdiction: Government of Uganda
- Headquarters: Twin Towers Sir Apollo Kaggwa Drive Kampala, Uganda
- Minister responsible: Lokii John Baptist, Minister for Karamoja Affairs
- Ministry executive: John Byabagambi, Minister for Karamoja Affairs
- Website: Homepage

The Ministry for Karamoja Affairs is a cabinet-level government ministry of Uganda. The ministry is responsible for coordinating all government programs in the five districts of the Karamoja sub-region.

Effective 2026, Lokii John Baptist serves as the Minister for Karamoja Affairs.

== Location ==
The headquarters of the ministry are located in the Twin Towers on Sir Apollo Kaggwa Road, in the Central Division of Kampala, Uganda's capital and largest city. The coordinates of the ministry headquarters are 0°18'58.0"N, 32°35'11.0"E (Latitude: 0.316111; Longitude: 32.586389).

== Overview ==
The ministry is part of the Office of the Prime Minister of Uganda.

== Administrative structure ==
The Cabinet Minister is assisted by the State Minister for Karamoja Affairs Florence Nambozo Wamala. Christine Guwatudde Kintu serves as the ministry's chief accounting officer.

== List of ministers ==
=== Minister for Karamoja Affairs ===
- Lokii John Baptist (26 May 2026 - present)
- Peter Lokeris (21 March 2024 - 26 May 2026)
- Mary Goretti Kitutu (8 June 2021 - 21 March 2023)
- John Byabagambi (6 June 2016 - 8 June 2021)

=== Ministry for Karamoja ===
- Janet Museveni (27 May 2011 - 6 June 2016)

== See also ==
- Parliament of Uganda
