= Lokwang Hillary =

Ugandan politician and Member of Parliament for Ik County

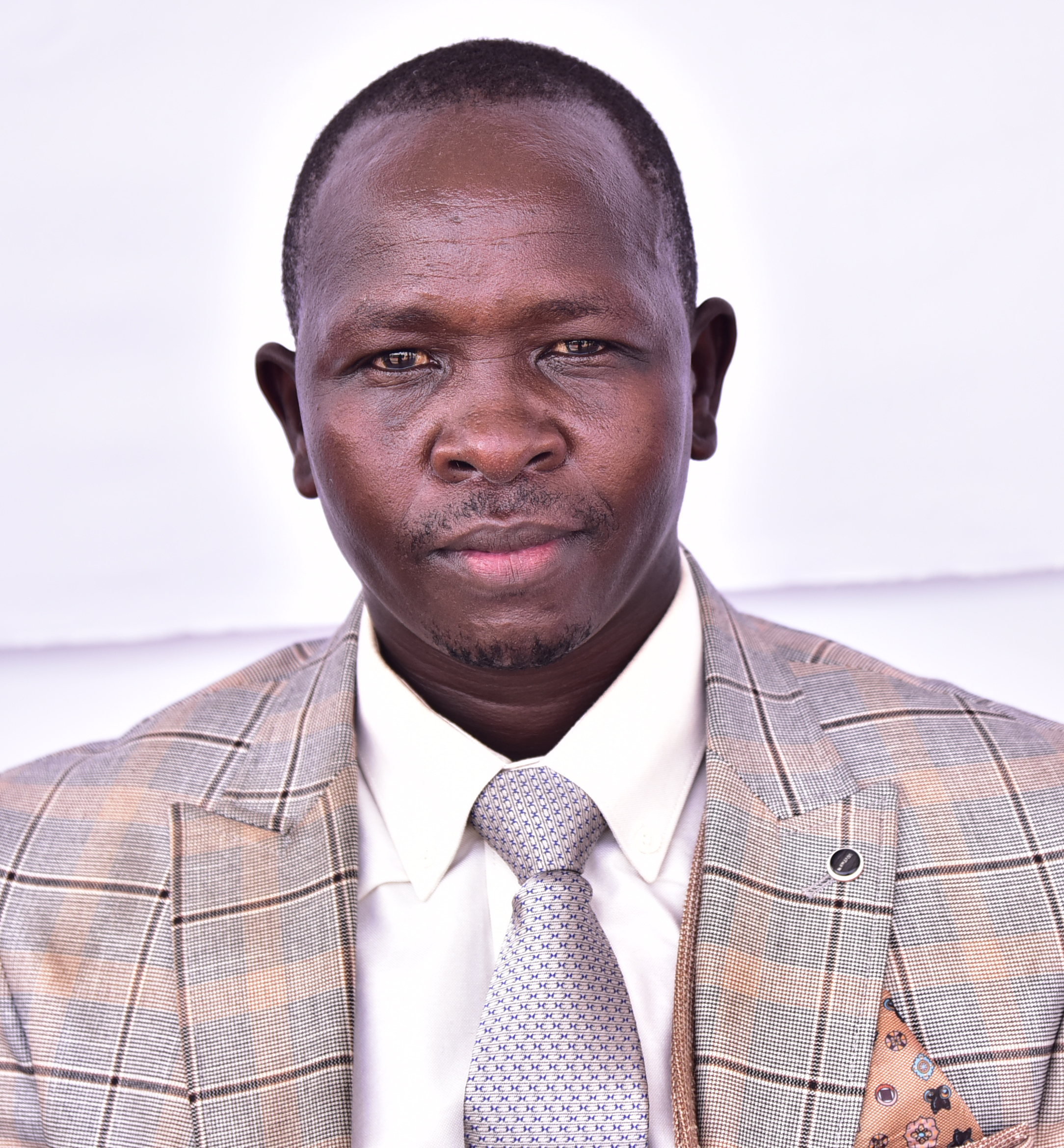
- Lokwang Hillary

Member of Parliament of Uganda
- Incumbent
- Assumed office February 2016
- Constituency: Ik county

Personal details
- Born: 3 April 1982 (age 44) Lodoi, Timu, Ik, Kaabong, Uganda
- Party: National Resistance Movement
- Education: St. Lawrence University
- Profession: Politician

Lokwang Hillary (born April 3, 1982) is a Ugandan politician representing Ik county in Kaabong district in the Parliament of Uganda. He is a member of the National Resistance Movement and has represented Ik county since 2016. A member of the Ik people, he was the first member of his ethnicity to go to university. He serves as the National Resistance Movement Chairperson for Kabong District.

== Early life and education ==
He was born on April 3, 1982 in Lodoi, Timu, Ik County, the youngest of seven. According to Hillary, he "grew up in the forest with my parents, where there was no existing civilization". He first attended Timu Primary School in 1987 on an inconsistent basis. By 1990, his family had moved to a Catholic mission and he went to the Komkuny boys’ missionary school. He dropped out of school in 1993 and by 1995, he had escaped to Kenya to the Kakuma refugee camp. He later returned home to escape again to the Dodoth West Constituency in northern Karamoja, where he received 7th grade education from Catholic missionaries. He finished secondary school by 2004 in the district of Mbale.

After meeting Janet Kataha Museveni in 2012, he received a scholarship and attended St. Lawrence University. In 2015, he graduated 2015 and received a bachelor's degree in public administration and management, the first of the Ik people to obtain a university degree.

== Political career ==
He became the MP for Ik County in February 2016, as he was the only person to obtain the education qualifications required for the Ugandan Parliament. In 2020, he was again unopposed for election to the 11th Parliament of Uganda. Since his election, Hillary has directed his efforts at obtaining digital infrastructure for Kaabong District, as well as the construction of schools and healthcare infrastructure.

A 2017 analysis by The Observer found that Hillary had given five speeches in 2016.

== See also ==
- Lokii John Baptist
- Faith Nakut
- Remigio Achia
