= Wandera =

Wandera can refer to:

- Wandera.com, zero-trust software company acquired by Jamf in 2021
- Wandera (name), a masculine given name, middle name, and surname
- Wandera, former parish in Arrawatta County, New South Wales, Australia
