= Gilbert Olanya =

Ugandan politician

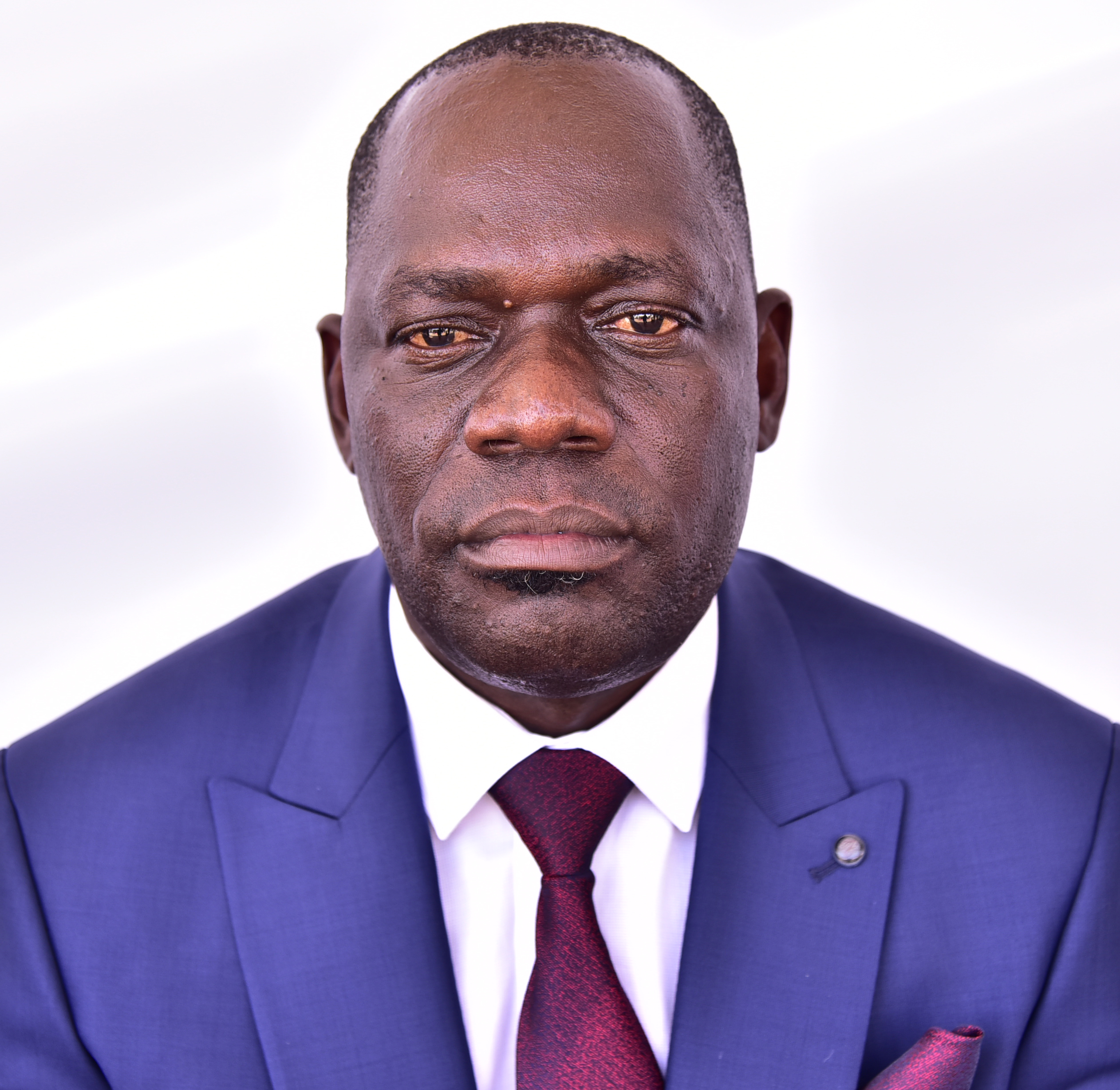

Member of 11th Parliament of Uganda
- In office 2021–2026
- Constituency: Kilak South

Personal details
- Party: Forum for Democratic Change

Gilbert Olanya is a Ugandan politician who served as a member of the Ugandan Parliament representing Kilak South on the ticket of the Forum for Democratic Change.

== Education ==
Olanya studied Bachelor of Arts in Education under scholarship, and graduated from Uganda Christian University in 2000. Gilbert Olanya also went and attained a master's degree in education from Kampala International University in 2006. He further earned a PhD in Education Management from Kyambogo University in 2025.

== Political career ==
Olanya was elected to the parliament from Kilak South on the ticket of FDC. He is a member of Acholi Parliamentary Group and serves as Secretary General of the group (APG). During the election of Speaker in the 11th parliament, he opposed the endorsement of Omoro county legislator Jacob Oulanyah for the office of speaker by APG warning that such endorsement could lead to sectarian and tribal politics which would affect APG if the endorsed candidate fails to win. In June 2020, Olanya was arrested and detained along with a colleague, Samuel Odonga Otto representing Aruu South, and two other persons for staging a protest against the handling of COVID-19 by Gulu Hospital. They were charged with incitement to violence and negligent acts likely to cause the spread of infectious diseases.

Olanya was cricised by a section of people from Acholi sub-region about the unexpected warming relations between the opposition MPs and the government. He later came out to clarify that the idea of cooperation between the opposition legislators from the Sub-region and the government didn't originate from the legislators but rather was an idea of the government itself.

== See also ==
- Akol Anthony
- Akello Lucy
