= Wandera (name) =

Wandera can be a masculine given name, a middle name, or a surname. Notable people with the name include:

== Given name ==
- Wandera Ogana, Kenyan professor of applied mathematics

== Middle name ==
- Julius Wandera Maganda, Ugandan politician

== Surname ==
- Erasmus Desiderius Wandera (1930–2022), Ugandan Catholic prelate
- Hellen Auma Wandera, Ugandan parliamentarian
- Kevinah Taaka Wanaha Wandera, Ugandan politician
