= John Bosco Ikojo =

Ugandan politician

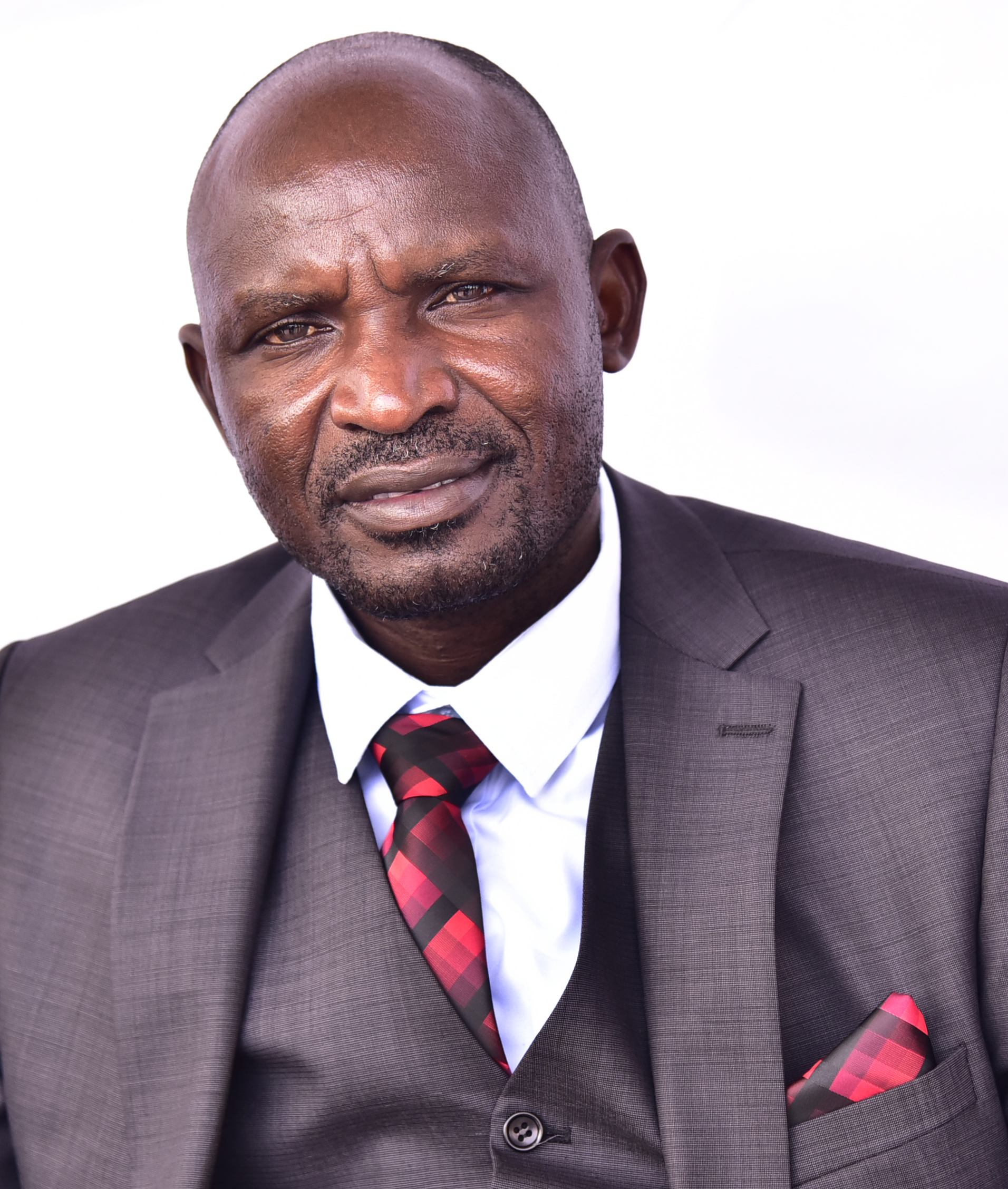
- Hon John Bosco Ikojo in 2015

Honorable

Personal details
- Born: John Bosco Ikojo; 21 July 1974 (age 52) Bukedea, Uganda
- Education: Makerere University (Bachelor of Commerce); Uganda Management Institute (Master of Business Administration)
- Occupation: Accountant, politician

John Bosco Ikojo (born 21 July 1974) is a Ugandan accountant, finance expert and politician. He entered Parliament after winning the Bukedea County seat in the 2016 general elections on the NRM ticket, and he served as a member of the NRM Parliamentary Caucus during the 10th Parliament (2016-2021). He served as a member on the Committee on National Economy and the Committee on Natural Resources in the 10th Parliament of Uganda. He was the Member of Parliament for Bukedea County Bukedea District in the 11th parliament (2021-2026), and a representative for NRM, the ruling political party in Uganda.

In the January 2026 general elections, he contested as an independent candidate after losing the NRM primary elections, and he was defeated by David Becham Okweere (NRM), who won the Bukedea County seat for 2026-2031 parliamentary term.

Prior to his political career, Ikojo worked as the head of finance for Bukedea Town Council and as an accountant for Kumi District Local Government. He is also the founder and managing director of ROSKO Uganda, a limited liability company in Uganda.

== Early life and education ==
Ikojo was born in Bukedea, Teso sub-region, on 21 July 1974 in an Anglican faith. He had his primary education in his hometown of Bukedea and attained PLE certification in 1988.

He then attended Wiggins Secondary School for his O-Level education and Ngora High School for his A-Level education, attaining a UCE certification in 1992 and a UACE certification in 1996.

Ikojo further advanced to Makerere University Business School at Uganda College of Commerce Aduku where he attained a higher diploma in marketing in 1998. He then went to Makerere University, graduating in 2006 with a Bachelor of Commerce. He additionally attained a Master of Business Administration from Uganda Management Institute in 2014.

== Career and politics ==
Ikojo started his professional career in 2000 after acquiring a higher diploma in marketing and worked as an accountant for Kumi District Local Government up until 2007 when he secured employment as the head of finance at Bukedea Town Council. He served the small municipality up until 2010 when he resigned to join elective politics.

In 2010, Ikojo joined elective politics on the National Resistance Movement ticket and strategized for the 2016 polls a move that saw him win both the party's 2015 primary elections and the 2016 general elections, thereby becoming a member of the 10th Parliament for Uganda, representing Bukedea County in Bukedea District. In the 10th Parliament, Ikojo serves on the Committee on National Economy and the Committee on Natural Resources. He is also a member of the NRM Parliamentary Caucus.

== Personal life ==
Ikojo is married, with a number of children.

He is the managing director of ROSKO Uganda, a limited liability company that he founded in 2004.
