= Tororo–Mbale–Soroti Road =

Road in Uganda

Coordinates: 01°08′20″N 34°09′54″E

Route information
- Length: 98 mi (158 km)
- History: Designated in 2010; Completion in 2015

Major junctions
- South end: Tororo
- Mbale; Bukedea; Kumi
- North end: Soroti

Location
- Country: Uganda

Highway system
- Roads in Uganda

Tororo–Mbale–Soroti Road is a road in Eastern Uganda, connecting the towns of Tororo in Tororo District to Mbale in Mbale District and Soroti in Soroti District.

== Location ==
The road starts at Tororo and goes through Mbale, Bukedea, and Kumi before ending in Soroti, a distance of about 158 kilometres (98 mi).

== Overview ==
In 2010 the road, previously gravel surfaced, began to undergo upgrades to class II bitumen surface and installation of shoulders and drainage channels. Dott Services Limited of Uganda was selected as the main contractor. The road comprises two sections; the Tororo–Mbale Road, measuring 48 kilometres (30 mi), and the Mbale–Soroti Road measuring 103 kilometres (64 mi). The Mbale–Soroti Section, which cost USh108 billion, was commissioned on 27 July 2015. The Tororo-Mbale Section, whose renovation price was USh63.8 billion was commissioned in August 2015. The renovations were funded entirely by the Ugandan government.

== Unsatisfactory work ==
When UNRA officials inspected this road in June 2016, prior to certifying the work as complete, they found it unsatisfactory. The contractor, Dott Services Limited, will have to repair the defects before collecting the USh60 billion final payment.

== See also ==
- List of roads in Uganda
