= Kibalya Henry Maurice =

Ugandan lawyer and politician (born 1977)

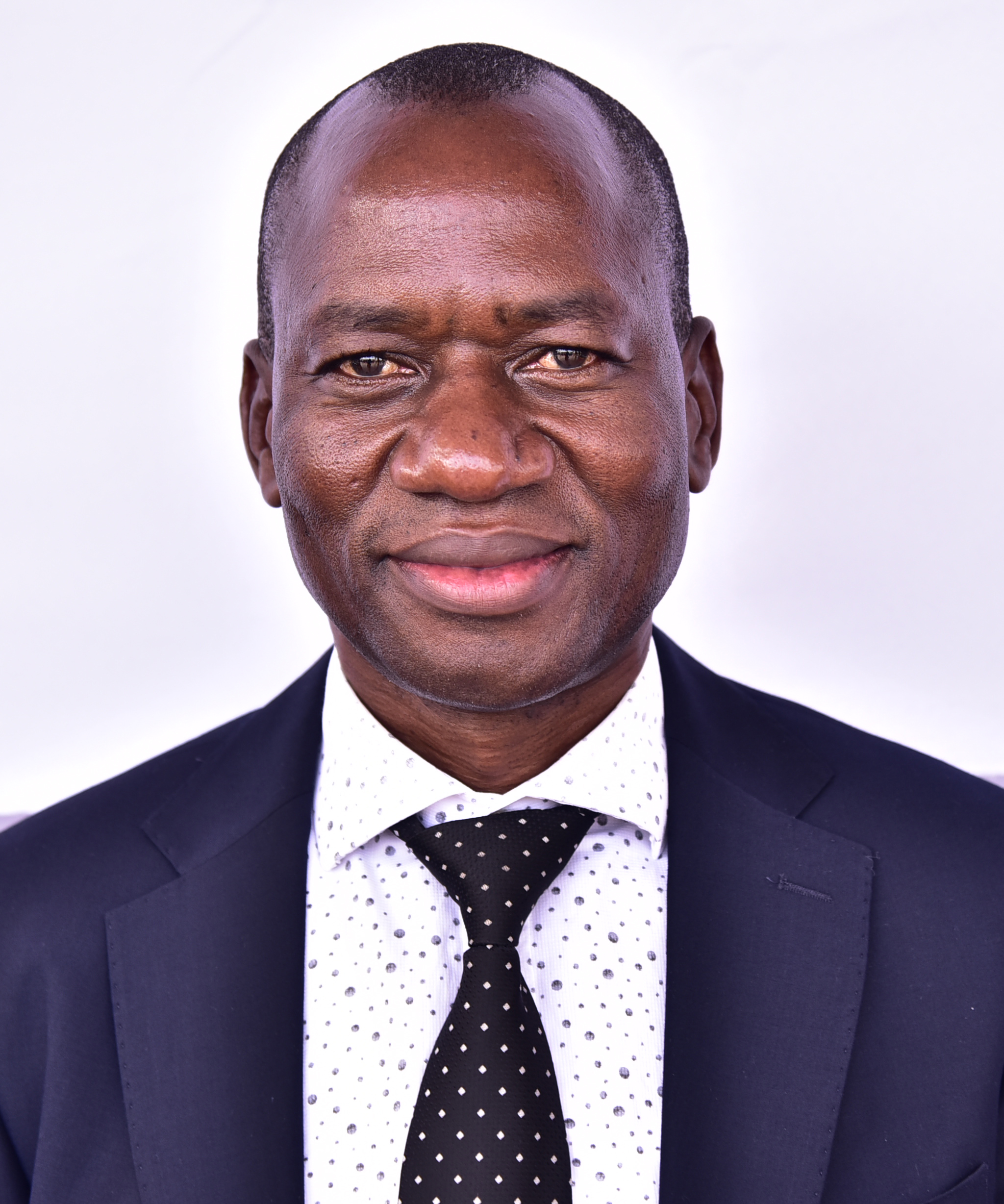
- Kibalya Henry Maurice in 2024

Member of Parliament for Bugabula County South
- Incumbent
- Assumed office 2016
- Constituency: Bugabula County South, Kamuli District

Personal details
- Born: December 7, 1977 (age 48) Kitayundwa, Bugabula County South, Kamuli District, Uganda
- Citizenship: Uganda
- Party: National Resistance Movement
- Parent: John Tumeino (father)
- Education: Makerere University (B.A. Economics)
- Alma mater: Makerere University
- Occupation: Economist, politician
- Known for: Member of Parliament, Bugabula County South; Former Guild President, Makerere University
- Website: Parliament of Uganda

Kibalya Henry Maurice (born 7 December 1977) is a Ugandan economist and politician. He is a Member of Parliament for Bugabula County South in Kamuli District, Busoga sub-region affiliated with the National Resistance Movement (NRM) and a former Guild President of Makerere University during the 2005/2006 academic year.

== Early life and education ==
Kibalya was born in Kitayundwa, Bugabula, Kamuli District, in the Busoga sub-region of Eastern Uganda to John Tumeino (father). He attended Naminage Primary School for his primary education, Busoga College Mwiri for his O-Level studies, and Kampala Students’ Centre for A-Level. He then pursued a Bachelor of Arts in economics at Makerere University, where he became active in student politics and leadership at the institution.

== Political career ==
While at Makerere University, Kibalya was elected Guild President (2005/2006) following a contested election during a time when he was affiliated with Democratic Party. His victory was challenged in court by his opponent (Tumwebaze), who alleged election irregularities, temporarily halting his swearing-in but after he was declared winner and swore in.

Kibalya is a member of the National Resistance Movement (NRM), Uganda's ruling political party was elected Member of Parliament for Bugabula County South, representing Kamuli District in the 10th & 11th Parliament of Uganda.

In Parliament, Kibalya has been active on issues of education policy, community welfare, and infrastructure development. He has advocated for the improvement of road networks in Busoga, emphasizing their role in regional economic growth. He has also raised concerns about unregulated money-lending operations in Kamuli District, warning of their exploitation of vulnerable residents. He is also a member of the Committee on National Economy.

== See also ==
- Parliament of Uganda
- National Resistance Movement
- Busoga sub-region
- Isaac Musumba
- Rebecca Kadaga
