= Christopher Komakech =

Ugandan politician

Hon. Christopher Komakech
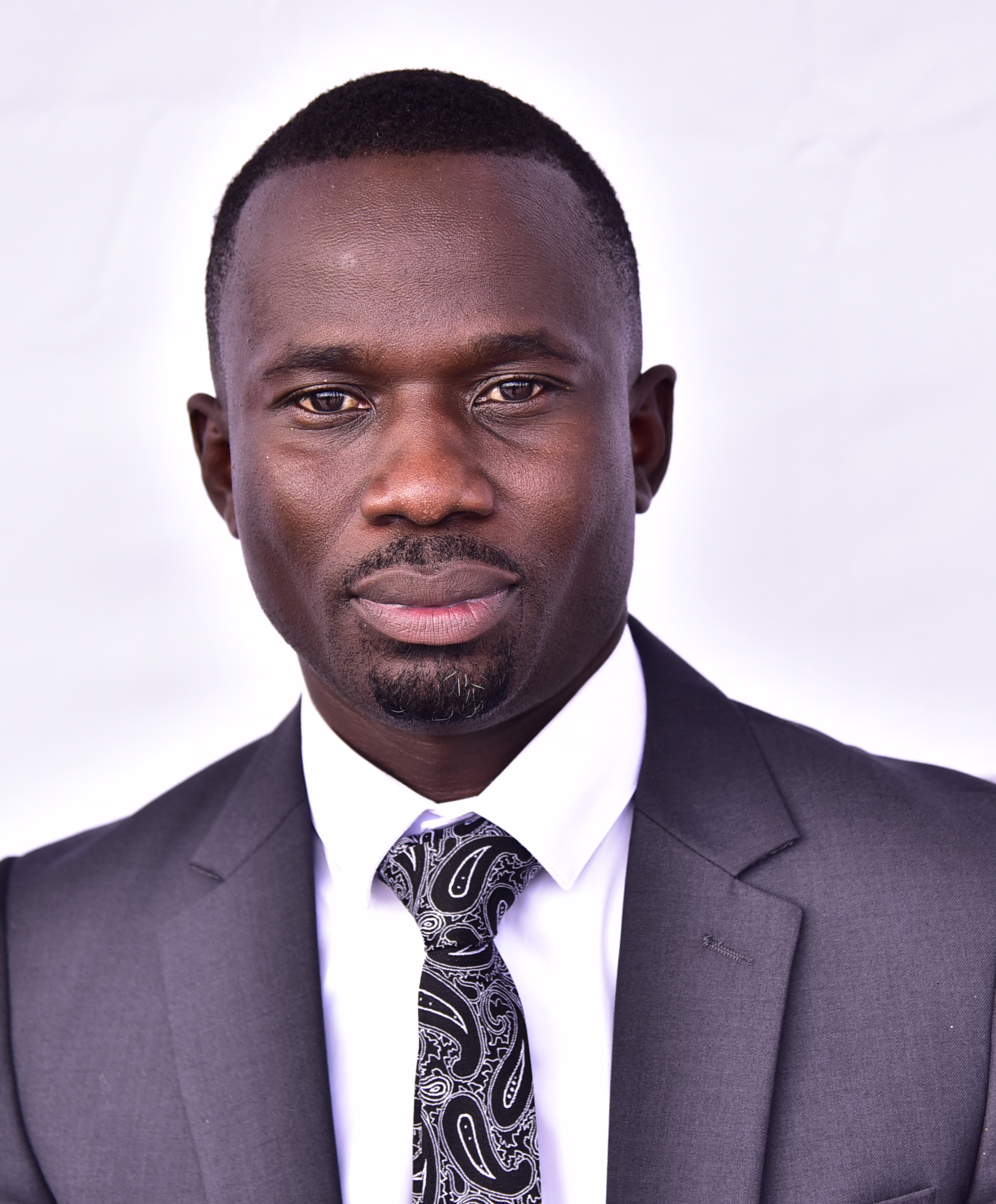

Member of Parliament for Aruu County
- Incumbent
- Assumed office 2021
- Preceded by: Samuel Odonga-Otto
- Constituency: Aruu County

Personal details
- Party: National Resistance Movement
- Occupation: Politician

Christopher Komakech (born 8 April 1985) is a Ugandan politician serving as the Member of Parliament for Aruu County in Pader District. He was first elected to parliament in the 2021 general election as an independent candidate and later aligned with the National Resistance Movement (NRM).

== Political career ==
Komakech entered politics during the 2021 parliamentary elections, contesting the Aruu County seat as an independent. He won the seat with 9,796 votes, defeating former MP Samuel Odonga Otto, who polled 6,199 votes. After his election, Komakech's victory was challenged in court on grounds that he had not properly resigned from his previous employment as a Neurotechnologist before contesting. The Court of Appeal quashed the High Court decision that had initially nullified his election and upheld his victory.

In November 2025, former Aruu County MP Samuel Odonga Otto issued a legal notice accusing Komakech of defamation, alleging that Komakech made false claims about the mismanagement of funds intended for the East Acholi Cooperative Union Ltd. Odonga Otto denied the allegations and called them politically motivated.

In the 2026 general election, Komakech retained his seat, narrowly defeating Odonga Otto with a margin of 26 votes in a result that has been contested and is expected to face further legal scrutiny.
