= Esther Afoyochan =

Ugandan politician

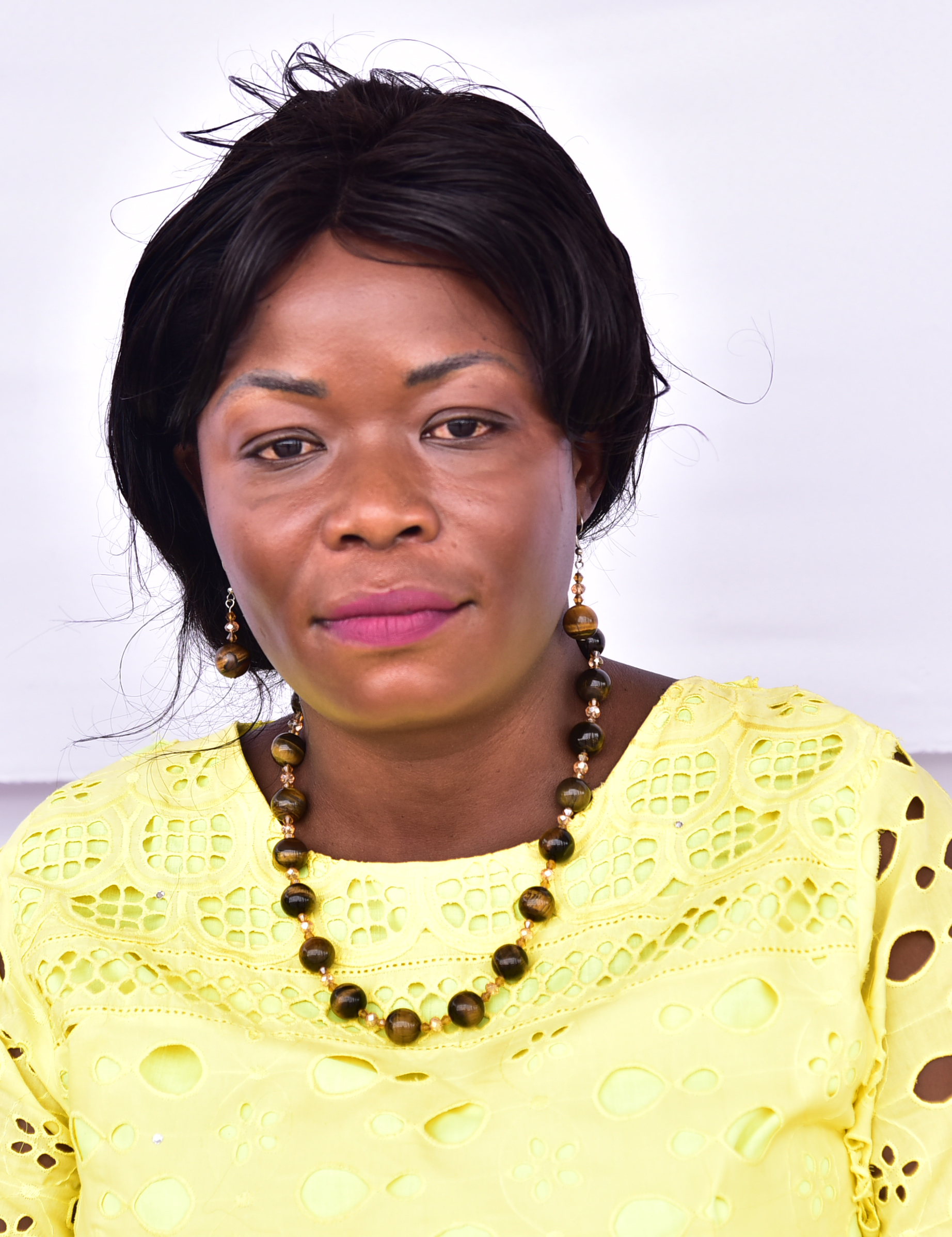

Woman Member of Parliament for Zombo District
- Incumbent
- Assumed office 2021

Personal details
- Born: Uganda
- Party: National Resistance Movement
- Occupation: Politician
- Known for: Member of Parliament for Zombo District

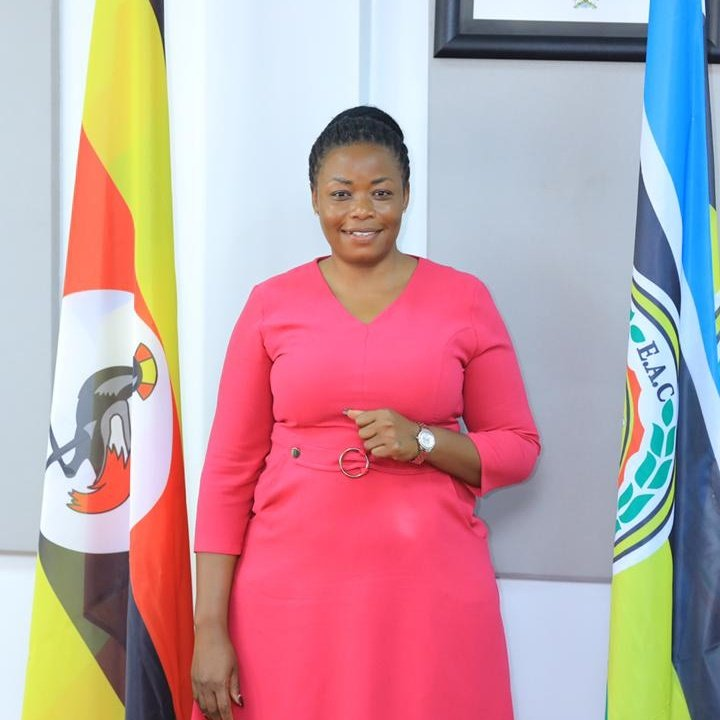
Esther Afoyochan

Esther Afoyochan is a Ugandan politician who serves as the woman member of parliament for Zombo district in 11th Parliament of uganda. She was elected in office as a woman representative in parliament during the 2021 Uganda general elections and a member of the ruling National Resistance Movement party.

She also serves as a backbench commissioner representing the ruling National Resistance Movement (NRM) in the 11th Parliament of Uganda.

== Political career ==
Afoyochan got involved in national politics in 2021 when she won the parliamentary seat to represent Zombo District as the Woman Member of Parliament. She was shortly after appointed to serve as a backbench commissioner on the Parliamentary Commission.

In 2021, during parliamentary discussions on the COVID-19 pandemic, she proposed that Members of Parliament contribute UGX 2 million each from their salaries to procure Pfizer vaccines for Ugandan children aged 2 to 18, a proposal which was rejected by fellow members of parliament.

== Controversy ==
In 2024, Afoyochan, Prossy Mbabazi Akampurira, Solomon Silwany, and Mathias Mpuuga the four backbench commissioners were indicted for awarding themselves a UGX 400 million "service award" without parliamentary approval. The action triggered national outrage as well as censure demands by other MPs. Opponents and opposition politicians called for her resignation.

== See also ==
- List of members of the eleventh Parliament of Uganda.
- National Resistance Movement.
- Zombo District.
- Member of Parliament.
- Parliament of Uganda.
