= Anthony Akol =

Ugandan politician

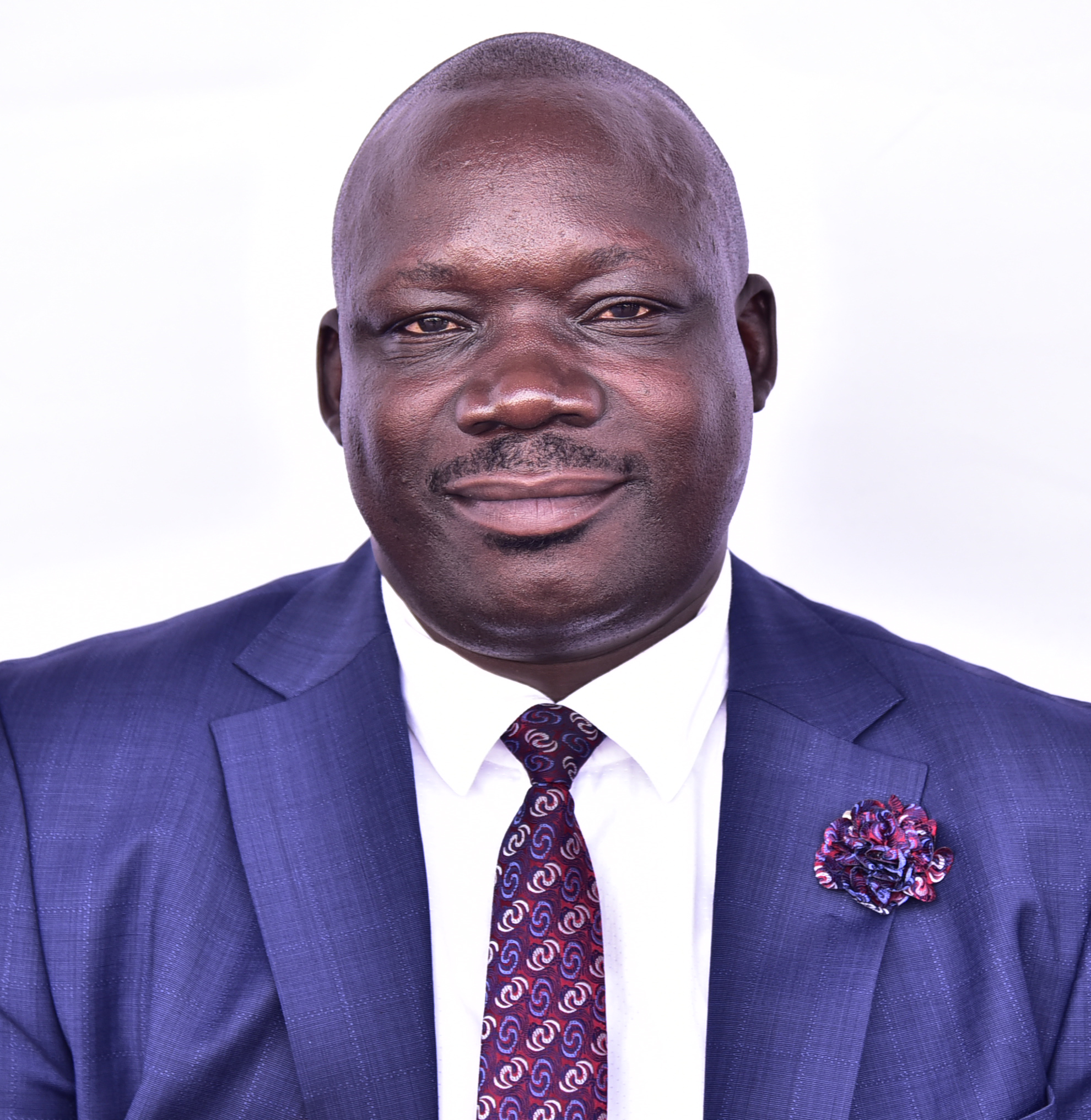

Member of 11th Parliament of Uganda
- Parliamentary group: Acholi Parliamentary Group (APG)
- Constituency: Kilak North

Personal details
- Party: Forum for Democratic Change
- Committees: Human Right, Finance and Planning and Economic Development

Anthony Akol is a Ugandan politician and a member of the Ugandan Parliament representing Kilak North constituency. He was elected as the leader of Acholi Parliamentary Group (APG) in July 2021 for a tenure of two and half years.

== Political career ==
Akol was elected to the parliament on the ticket of the Forum for Democratic Change and serves on the committees on Human Right, Finance and Planning and Economic Development. In July 2021, he was elected the leader of the Acholi Parliamentary Group (APG) with 11 votes defeating Omoro District Woman Member of Parliament, Catherine Lamwaka who scored 10 votes. On 30 January 2020, Akol was involved in a physical altercation with his colleague representing Aruu County, Odonga Otto in the pigeon hall lobby of parliament. After the fight, Akol told the press that he only defended himself against the punch of his colleague, describing himself as a heavyweight and saying that if he had punched Otto he would have been down. In April 2019, Akol's vehicle hit a stray cow crossing the highway in Wakisanyi village in Kiryandongo district resulting in an accident injuring him.
