= Micah Akasile Lolem =

Ugandan politician

Honourable Micah Akasile Lolem

Member of the Parliament of Uganda
- Incumbent
- Assumed office 24 May 2021
- Preceded by: Christopher Akorikimo
- Constituency: Upe County, Amudat District

Member of the Parliament of Uganda
- In office 19 May 2011 – 11 May 2016
- Preceded by: Francis Kiyonga Adamson
- Succeeded by: Christopher Akorikimo
- Constituency: Upe County, Amudat District

Personal details
- Born: July 10, 1967 (age 59)
- Party: National Resistance Movement

Micah Akasile Lolem (born 10 July 1967), is a Ugandan politician who serves as an MP of Uganda representing the people of Upe County, Amudat district, Karamoja Sub-region in the 11th Parliament of Uganda. He was elected as a National Resistance Movement party Member of Parliament in the 2021 General elections. He also represents his constituents on issues of national importance.

== Career ==
Lolem is a member ex officio of the Karamoja Peace And Technology University council.

== Personal life ==
Lolem is Catholic.

== See Also ==
- Simon Lokodo
- Faith Nakut
- Peter Lokeris
