= Bukedea =

- Bukedea

- Map of Uganda showing the location of Bukedea.
- Coordinates: 01°20′51″N 34°02′40″E
- Country: Uganda
- Region: Eastern Region of Uganda
- Sub-region: Teso sub-region
- District: Bukedea District

Government
  - Member of Parliament: John Bosco Ikojo
- Elevation: 1,125 m (3,691 ft)

Population (2020 Estimate)
  - Total: 13,900
- Time zone: UTC+3 (EAT)

Bukedea is a town in the Eastern Region of Uganda. It is the chief municipal, administrative, and commercial center of Bukedea District, and the district headquarters are located there.

== Location ==
Bukedea is situated on the main highway (A-109) between Mbale and Soroti. It is approximately 69 kilometres (43 mi), by road, southeast of Soroti, the largest city in Teso sub-region. This is approximately 35 kilometres (22 mi), by road, northwest of Mbale, the largest city in Uganda's Eastern Region. The coordinates of the town are:01 20 51N, 34 02 40E (Latitude:1.347500; Longitude:34.044444).

== Population ==
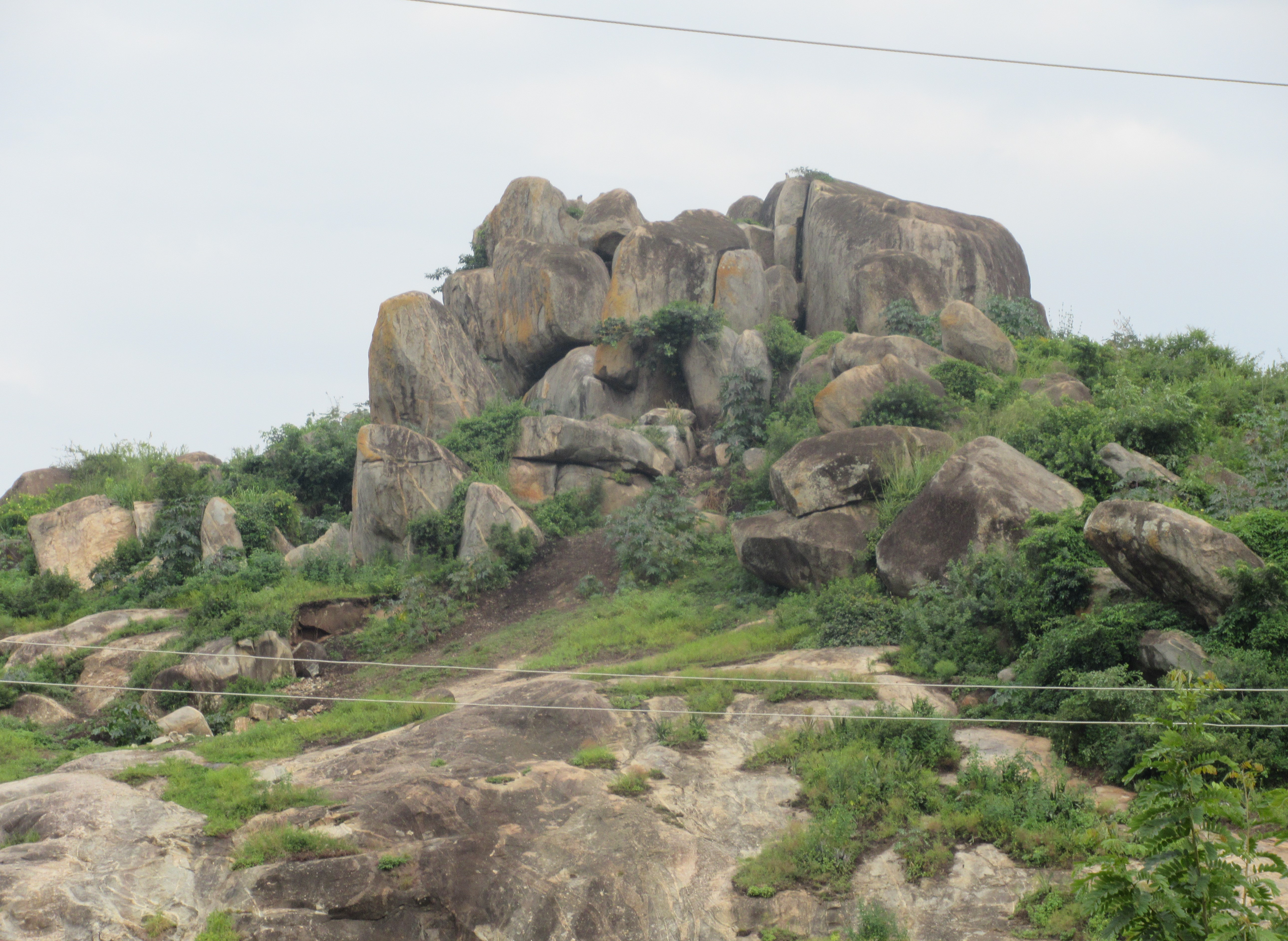
Rocks in Kachumbala Subcounty, Bukedea District

According to the Uganda Bureau of Statistics (UBOS), the population of Bukedea Town in 2015, was 11,300. In 2020, UBOS estimated the mid-year population of the town at 13,900, of whom 7,000 (50.4 percent) were females and 6,900 (49.6 percent) were male. The population of the town was calculated to grow at an estimated rate of 4.23 percent annually between 2015 and 2020.

Historical population
Year	Pop.	±%
2015	11,300	—
2020	13,900	+23.0%

== Points of interest ==
The following points of interest are located within the town limits or close to the edges of town: (a) the headquarters of Bukedea District Administration (b) the offices of Bukedea Town Council (c) a mobile branch of PostBank Uganda (d) Bukedea central market, the source of fresh daily produce and (e) the Tororo–Mbale–Soroti Road passes through town in a general southeast to northwest direction.

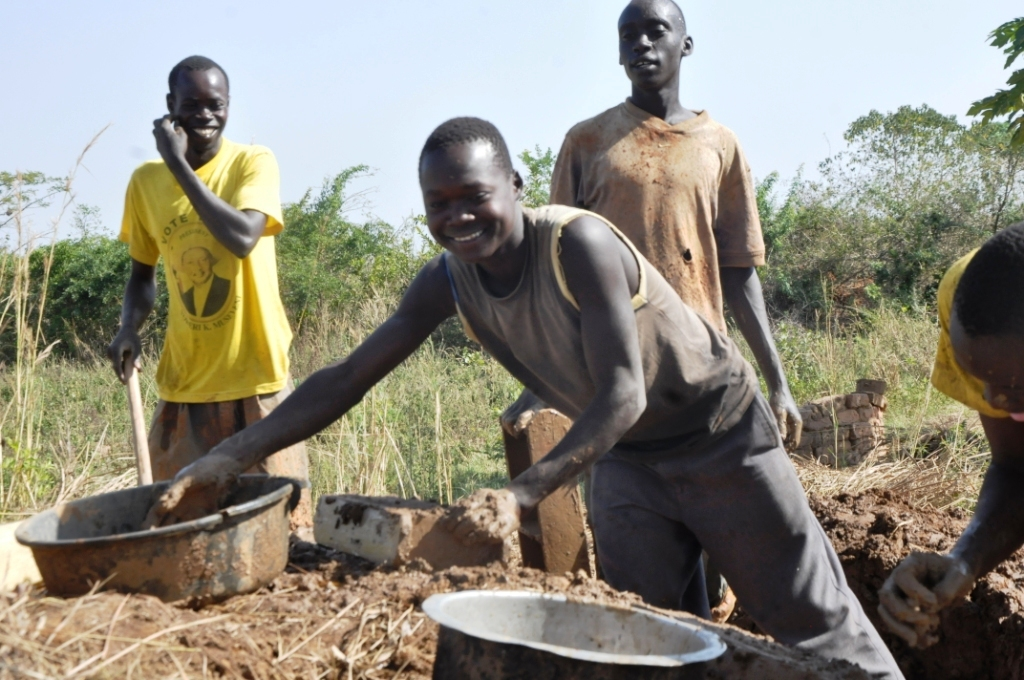
Youth making bricks in Kabarwa Village in Bukedea district Uganda

The area member of parliament (MP), is John Bosco Ikojo, a member of the ruling National Resistance Movement political party, who serves as the chairperson of the Parliamentary Committee on the National Economy in the 11th Parliament (2021–2026).

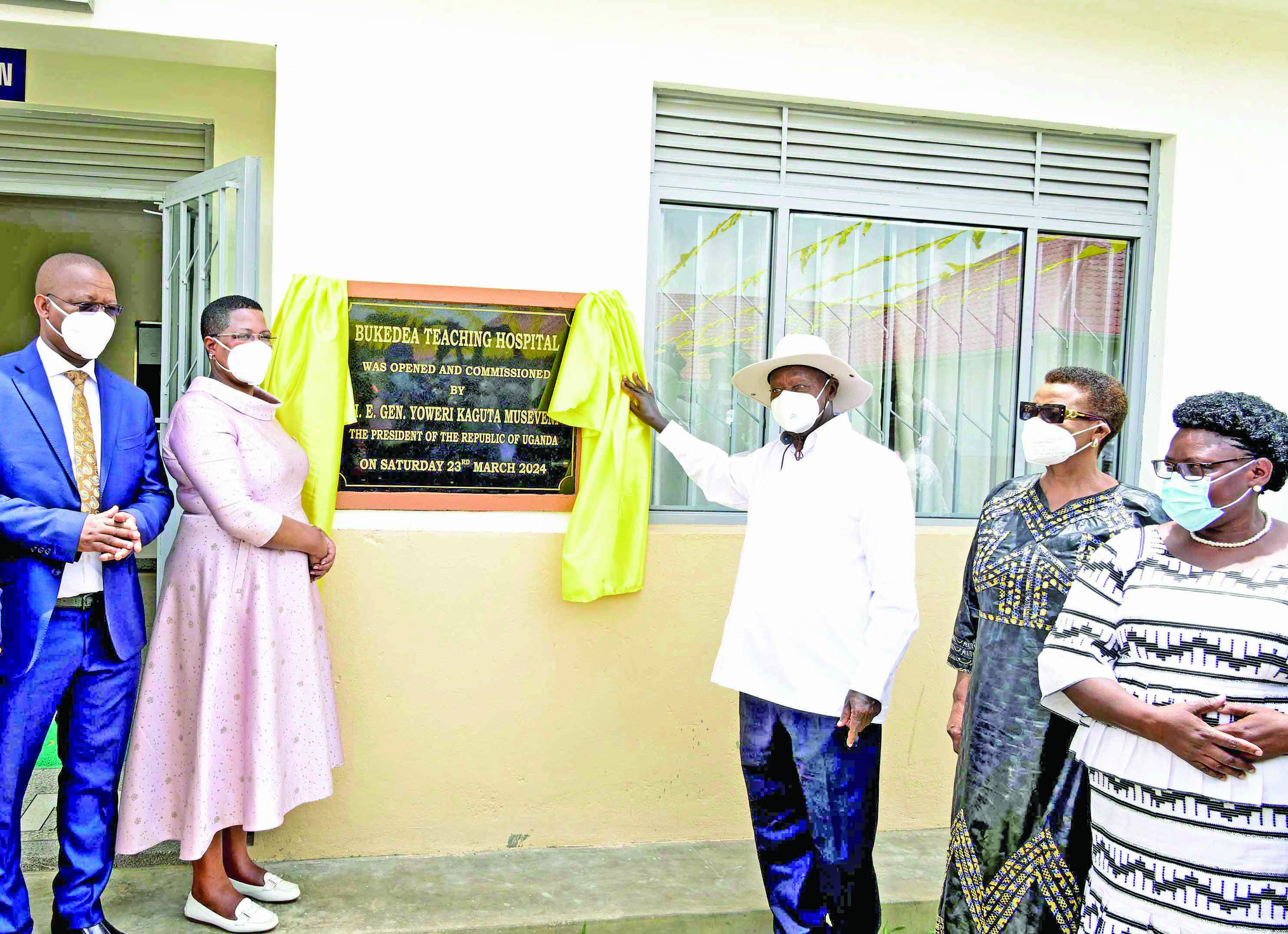
President Museveni accompanied by Speaker Anita Among opens Bukedea Teaching Hospital in 2024

== See also ==
- List of cities and towns in Uganda
- Teso sub-region
