= Opolot-Okwalinga Simon Peter =

Hon. Opolot-Okwalinga Simon Peter
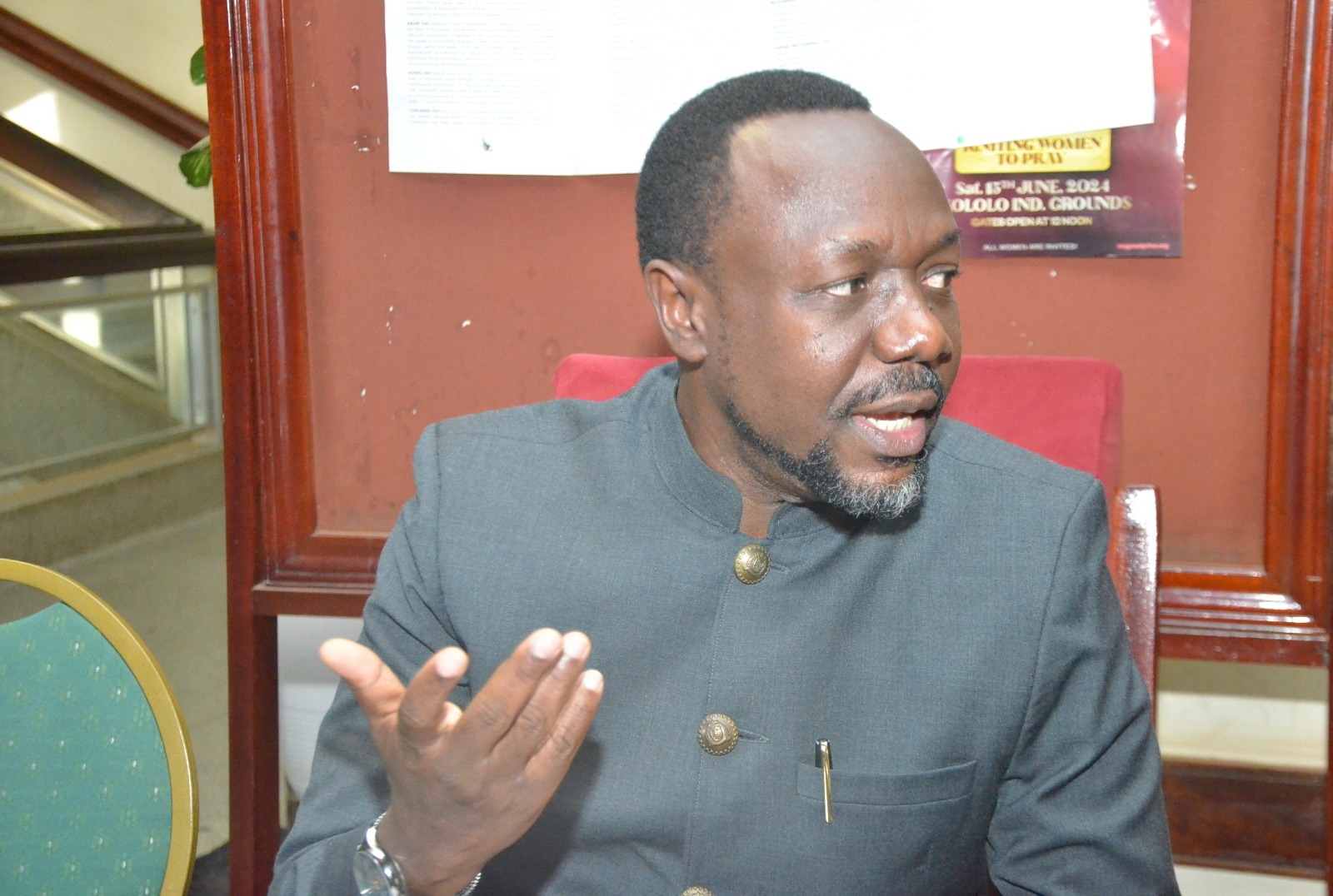
- Hon. Opolot-Okwalinga in 2024

Member of Parliament for Kanyum County, Kumi District
- Incumbent
- Assumed office 20 May 2021
- President: Yoweri Kaguta Museveni

Chairperson of the Teso Parliamentary Group(TPG)
- Incumbent
- Assumed office 7 July 2026
- Preceded by: Bosco Okiror

Personal details
- Born: Opolot Simon Peter Okwalinga Mukongoro, Kumi District, Uganda
- Party: National Resistance Movement
- Education: Makerere University (BA); University of Leeds (MA); University of Duisburg-Essen (MA); Royal Military Academy Sandhurst (OCdt); National Defense University, Washington D.C, USA; Defence Academy of the United Kingdom, UK
- Occupation: Politician, security policy strategist
- Known for: Politics, security policy, The Guardian Ideology
- Nickname: Edaran Lo'Itunga / The People's Guardian

Opolot-Okwalinga Simon Peter aka 'The People's Guardian' is a Ugandan politician, and Security policy Strategist, who serves as the Member of Parliament for Kanyum County, Kumi District, a position he has held since 2021. He was re-elected to retain his seat in the August House during the January 2026 polls. Opolot-Okwalinga serves as the current Chairperson Teso Parliamentary Group(TPG).He is the founder of the Center for Strategic and International Insights(CSII) and chief Guardian of the Guardian Ideology, a Governance philosophy that espouses every leader to be a true guardian of the people and natural resources. This has consequently earned him the popular reference, ‘the People‘s Guardian.’A member of the governing National Resistance Movement (NRM), he is also a member of the Patriotic League of Uganda(PLU), a non-partisan civic organization, pressure group and patriotic social movement founded and led by Uganda's first son and Chief of Defence Forces Gen Muhoozi Kainerugaba. On 24th July 2026, Opolot-Okwalinga was awarded a Patriotic Officer Number(PO089) by the Chairman of the Patriotic League of Uganda(PLU), Gen Muhoozi. He established a public profile through a career defined by military engagements, Defense policy analysis and senior technocratic service within the Ugandan government. In the January 2026 general parliamenary elections, he secured a significant electoral victory by defeating the President of the Forum for Democratic Change (FDC), Patrick Oboi Amuriat in the Kanyum Member of Parliament race.

== Early life, education and Student Activism ==
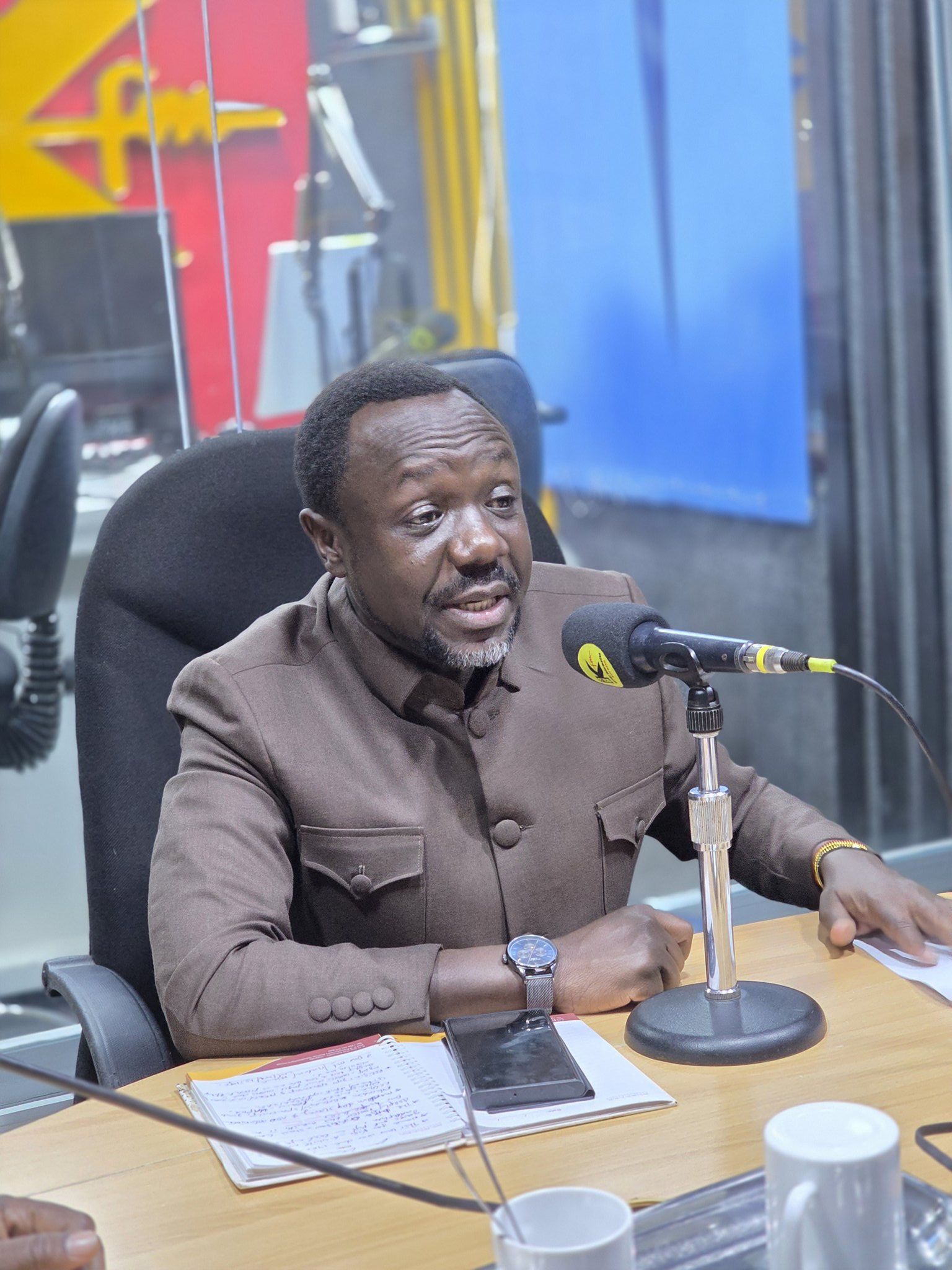
Hon Opolot-Okwalinga during a talk show

Opolot-Okwalinga was born around late January 1979, in Mukongoro- Kumi District, Eastern Uganda. He attended St. Peter's College Tororo for his secondary education. His early entry into national service began in 1994 during his high school years when he was recruited into the National Resistance Army(NRA) as a Student Kadogo Cadre under the leadership of the historical NRM figure Brigadier Eriya Kategaya (RIP). He enrolled at Makerere University, where he obtained a Bachelor of Arts in Social Sciences with a major in Sociology in 2002. Throughout his undergraduate years, he was a highly active leader in patriotic student movements. Between 2000 and 2002, he served as the Director for Special Duties in the Movement Forum, which was established as the first-ever NRM Students Association at Makerere University. His subsequent postgraduate education and strategic development training was supported by several international scholarships. In 2005, he was awarded a Commonwealth Scholarship under the Commonwealth Scholarship and Fellowship plan to study at the University of Leeds(School of Politics and International Studies) in the United Kingdom, where he earned a Master of Arts in Strategic Studies. During this period, he pursued professional military training, completing an Officer Cadet course with the University Officers Training Corps (UOTC) under the Royal Military Academy Sandhurst(RMAS).

In 2010, he received a scholarship from the German Academic Exchange Service (DAAD) to attend the University of Duisburg-Essen, obtaining a master's degree in Development and Governance with a specialization in Defence Policy Analysis. In 2011, he completed the Defence and Security Management Staff Course at the Defence Academy of the United Kingdom. He also completed the Senior Security and Military Leaders Staff Course at the Africa Center for Strategic Studies, National Defense University in Washington D.C, USA later in 2012.

== Professional and military career ==
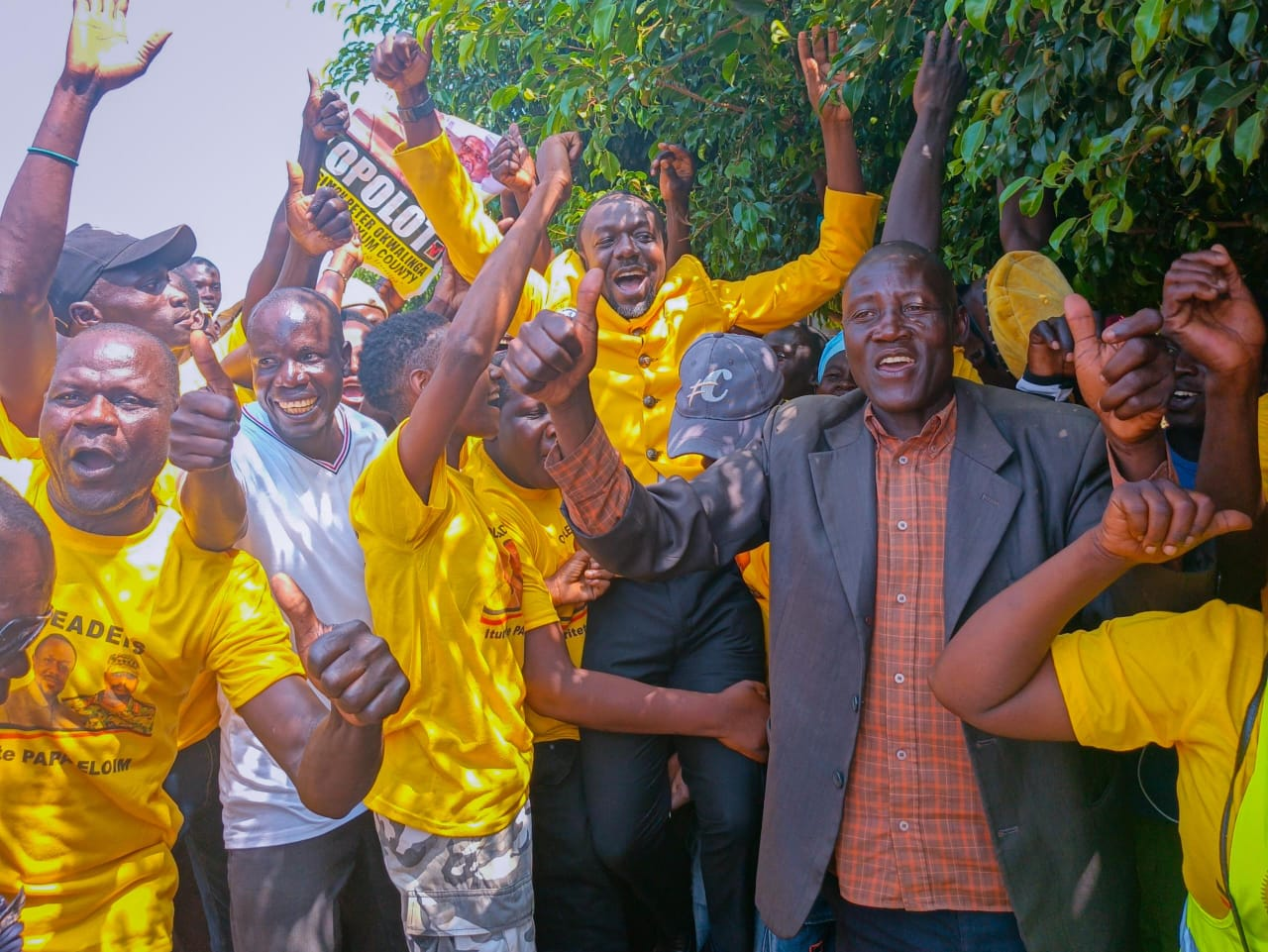
A controversial picture of Hon Opolot-Okwalinga and his supporters donning t-shirts with the image of Gen Muhoozi Kainerugaba during the 2026 parliamentary elections

Opolot-Okwalinga's early career began during his undergraduate studies, serving from 1999 to 2002 as a Research Officer at the Directorate of Military Intelligence(DMI) Headquarters under Brig Nobel Mayombo. In August 2003, Opolot-Okwalinga was deployed to the Inspectorate of Government (IGG), where he investigated and made inquiries into cases of administrative malpractice. Prior to concluding his service at the Inspectorate in September 2009, he served at principal-level, as the Overall Head of the Moroto Regional Office and as the Head of the Media, Communications, and Public Relations Unit at the IGG Headquarters in Kampala during the tenure of Justice Faith Mwondha. This background has largely informed his firm stand and zero tolerance attitude against corruption.Following his tenure at the IGG, Opolot-Okwalinga was deployed into Uganda's Defence architecture. Between 2009 and 2012, he served as a Principal Research Officer within the Office of the Joint Chief of Staff at Uganda People's Defence Forces' headquarters in Mbuya, under Ministry of Defence and Veteran Affairs. He was then appointed Principal Research Officer and Personal Assistant to the Chief of Defence Forces(CDF), Gen. Aronda Nyakairima still at the UPDF General HeadQuarters from 2012 to 2013. During this assignment, he also worked at the Centre for Doctrine Synthesization and Development under the Office of the Commander Military Doctrine.

From 2013 to 2021, Opolot-Okwalinga served as Principal Advisor and Personal Assistant to the Minister of Internal Affairs. He provided policy advice consecutively across the tenures of three ministers: Gen.Aronda Nyakairima, Hon. Rose Akol and Gen.Odongo Jeje.

In 2015, Opolot-Okwalinga was designated to the North Atlantic Treaty Organization's(NATO) largest and most ambitious operational military exercise since 2002 as a Subject Matter Expert(SME) in military war plans. In this capacity, he contributed to NATO's Trident Juncture Exercise(TRJE15) at the Joint Warfare Centre in Stavanger, Norway.

== Political career ==
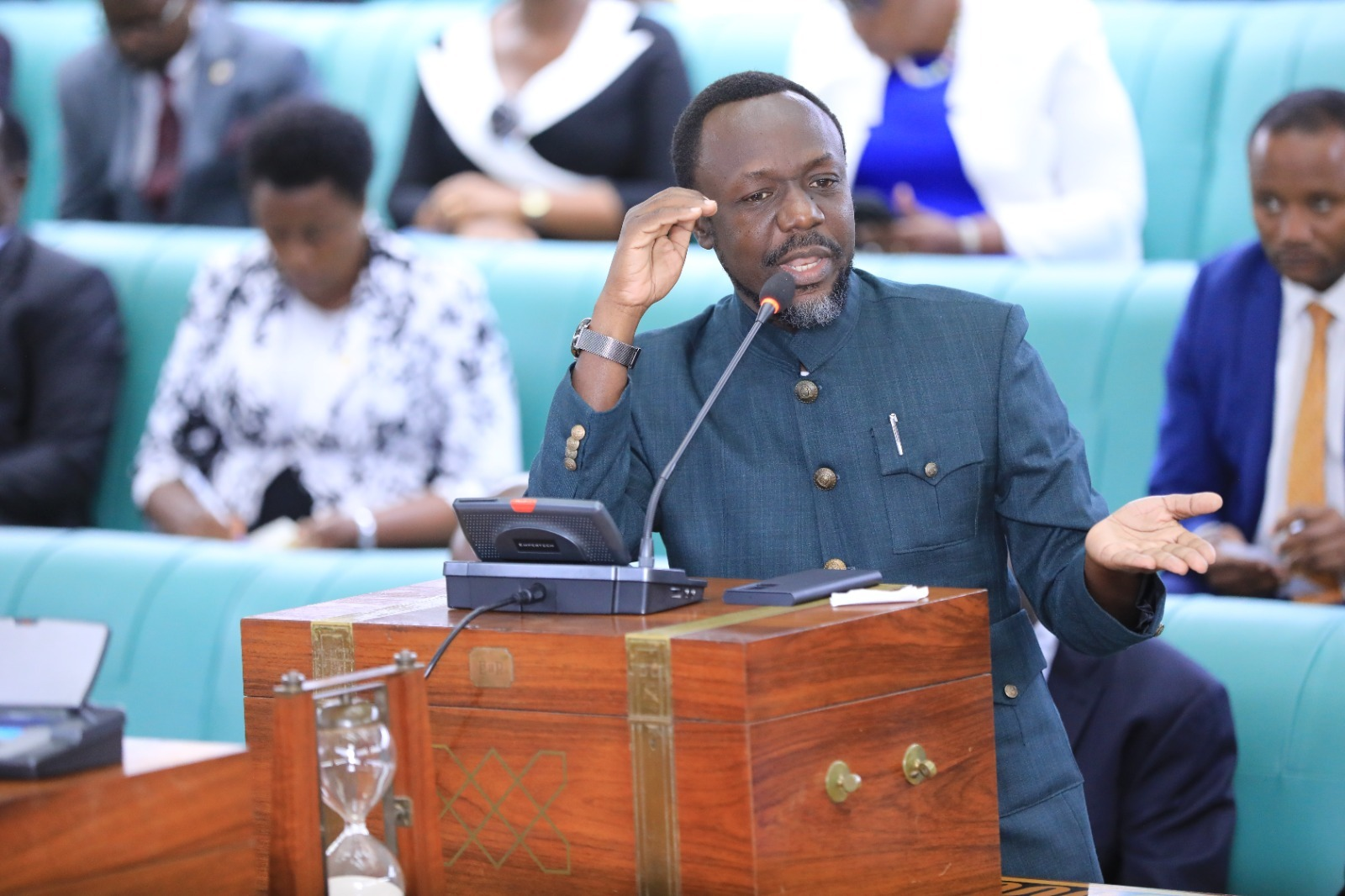
Hon Opolot-Okwalinga

In 2014, he authored and launched the Guardian Ideology from Makerere University, a political framework asserting that leadership should function as a form of stewardship or guardianism. According to his book the Instrumental Guide to the Guardian Ideology; the Ideology encompasses five values; Value for God as creator and source, value for people and inborn talents, value for natural resource endowment, value for science and tech, and the value for interconnectedness of all human kind. This ideology eventually led his supporters to refer to him by the title Edaran Lo'Itunga ("The People's Guardian")

Following a vast experience in administrative service within national defence and internal security frameworks, Opolot-Okwalinga got into elective politics. In the 2021 general elections, he won the Parliamentary seat for Kanyum County, Kumi district under the National Resistance Movement) flag. During his tenure in the 11th Parliament of Uganda, he became an active participant in legislative oversight. He served on several committees, including the Committee on National Economy, the Committee on Defence and Internal Affairs, the Human Rights Committee, and the Committee on Presidential Affairs.

During a committee sitting in April 2026, Hon Opolot drew national media attention when he recommended that the State House Comptroller, Jane Barekye advise a long serving President Yoweri Museveni, to appoint his son also Chief of Uganda's military, Gen Muhoozi Kainerugaba as vice president in the following cabinet. The proposal was backed by the current General Secretary of the Patriotic League of Uganda(PLU) Hon Twalla Fadil who was present, this was however viewed by political critics and commentators as a potential precursor to the "Muhoozi Project", a controversial succession plan to have Gen Muhoozi take up the Ugandan presidency after his father. This plan was first mentioned by Gen David Sejusa in 2013.

In the January 2026 general elections, Opolot-Okwalinga retained his seat in Kanyum County as Member of Parliament, defeating Patrick Oboi Amuriat. The victory was characterized as a major political upset for the Forum for Democratic Change given Kumi district’s previous characterization as an opposition stronghold since 2002.

Hon.Opolot-Okwalinga was elected as the Chairperson of the Teso Parliamentary Group(TPG) on 7th July 2026 replacing the Hon. Bosco Okiror.In September 2026, he was appointed to serve as a Member of the Presidential Advisory Committee on Budget (PACOB). The Appointment was done with approval of H.E the President through the Rt Hon Prime Minister of Uganda.
