= Solomon Silwany =

Ugandan politician

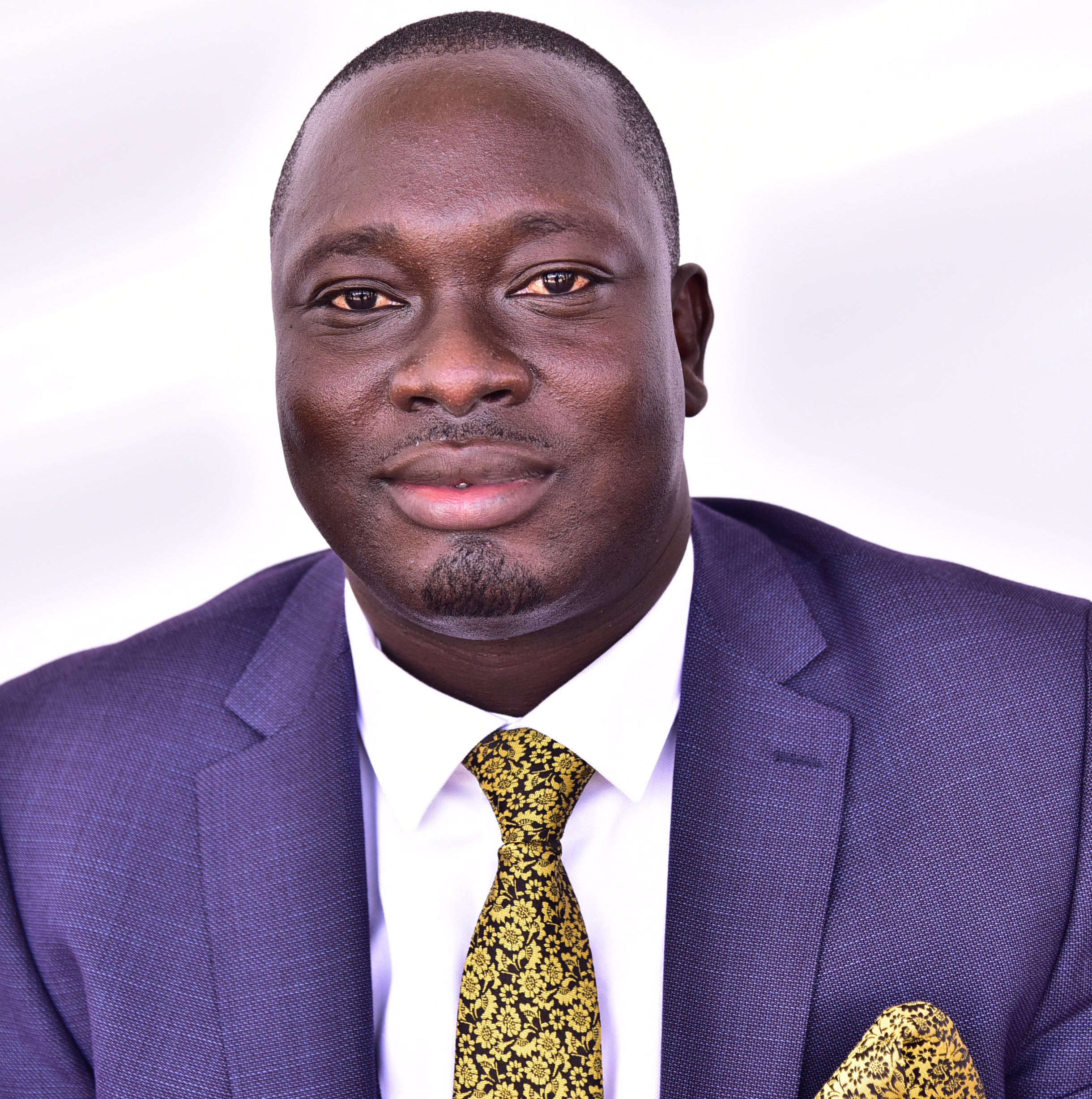

Member of the 11th Parliament of Uganda from Bukooli County Central
- Incumbent
- Assumed office 2021

Personal details
- Born: March 14, 1983 (age 43)
- Party: National Resistance Movement (NRM)
- Education: Makerere University

Solomon Silwany (born March 14, 1983) is a Ugandan politician and a member of the 11th parliament representing Bukooli County Central. He is a member of the National Resistance Movement (NRM).

== Education ==
Silwany holds a bachelor of Arts Degree from Makerere University.

== Political career ==
Silwany is a member of parliament who previously served on the Natural Resources Committee and former Deputy Chairperson of the NRM caucus in the parliament. He was elected to the Parliamentary Commission – the highest decision-making organ of Parliament in the 11th parliament replacing Peter Ogwang.
