= Mary Goretti Kitutu =

Ugandan politician

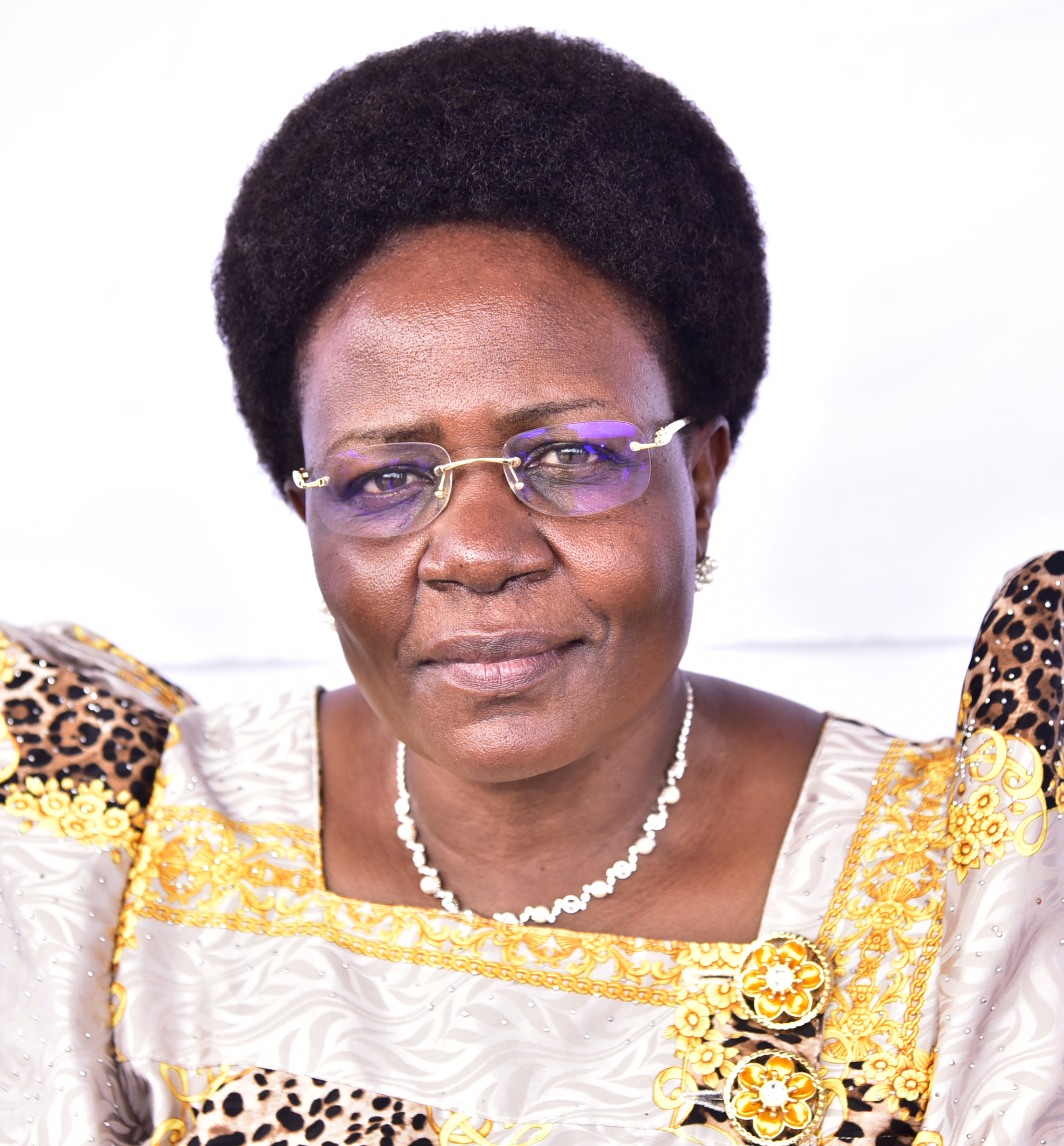
- Born: 17 September 1962 (age 64); Manafwa District, Uganda
- Education: Makerere University (BS, DipEd, PhD); University of Twente (MS)
- Occupations: Engineer; politician
- Years active: 1988–present
- Title: Cabinet Minister of Energy and Mineral Development
- Spouse: Michael Kitutu

Mary Goretti Kitutu, also Mary Goretti Kitutu Kimono (born 17 September 1962) is a Ugandan academic, politician and environmentalist. She was appointed Minister for Karamoja Affairs on 8 June 2021, replacing John Byabagambi. She was the Minister of Energy and Mineral Development, in the Ugandan Cabinet, from 14 December 2019 to 8 June 2021. Before that, from 10 June 2016, until 14 December 2019, she served as the State Minister for the Environment in the Cabinet of Uganda. Kitutu served as the elected Manafwa District Women's Representative in the 11th Parliament of Uganda (2021 - 2026). She was appointed minister for Karamoja affairs from 2021 until her removal in 2024 following corruption charges related to humanitarian aid materials.

== Early life and education ==
Mary Goretti was born in Manafwa District on 17 September 1962.She went to Situmi Primary School in Namisindwa district formerly known as Buhhaweka sub-county where she sat for her Primary Leaving Examinations before entering in Tororo Girls school for both "O" and "A" level, she entered Makerere University in 1984, graduating in 1987 with a Bachelor of Science degree in Chemistry and Geology. In 1993, she went back to Makerere and obtained a Postgraduate Diploma in Education. Her Master of Science degree was obtained in 1998 from the Faculty of Geo-Information Science and Earth Observation of the University of Twente, in Enschede, Netherlands. In 2011, she obtained a Doctor of Philosophy from Makerere University, in Kampala, Uganda.

== Career ==
Mary Goretti's first job out of university was as a teacher at Busoga College Mwiri from 1988 until 1991. From 1991 until 1996, she taught at Our Lady of Good Counsel School in Gayaza, Wakiso District. After she left teaching, she worked as a consultant at Axis Technical Geo Mineral Consult, between 1998 and 2001.

In April 2002, she was hired as a Research Officer and Environmental Specialist at the National Environment Management Authority (NEMA), serving in that capacity until February 2015. From February 2015, she worked as a Senior Technical Advisor and Environmental Monitor at Tetra Tech, a project sponsored by USAID, serving in that capacity until 2015.

== Politics ==
In late 2015, Kitutu entered Ugandan elective politics by contesting the Manafwa District Women Representative election in the 2016 national and parliamentary elections. She ran on the National Resistance Movement political party platform. She was appointed State Minister for the Environment on 6 June 2016. In a cabinet reshuffle on 14 December 2019, Mary Goretti Kitutu, was named Cabinet Minister for Energy and Mineral Development. She replaced Irene Muloni, who was dropped from Cabinet . She contested again and won another term as Manafwa District Women Representative in the 2021 parliamentary elections.

== International Sanctions ==
On April 30, 2024, the UK's Foreign Office announced personal sanctions against Mary Kitutu and another high Ugandan official under its Global Anti-Corruption sanctions regime for their involvement in significant corruption in relation to illegal appropriation of thousands of iron sheets allocated for housing of the poorest communities in the Karamoja region as part of a government-funded project, making her a subject to an asset freeze and a travel ban.

== See also ==
- Cabinet of Uganda
- Parliament of Uganda
- Agnes Nandutu
