= Ayoo Tonny =

Ugandan politician (born 1974)

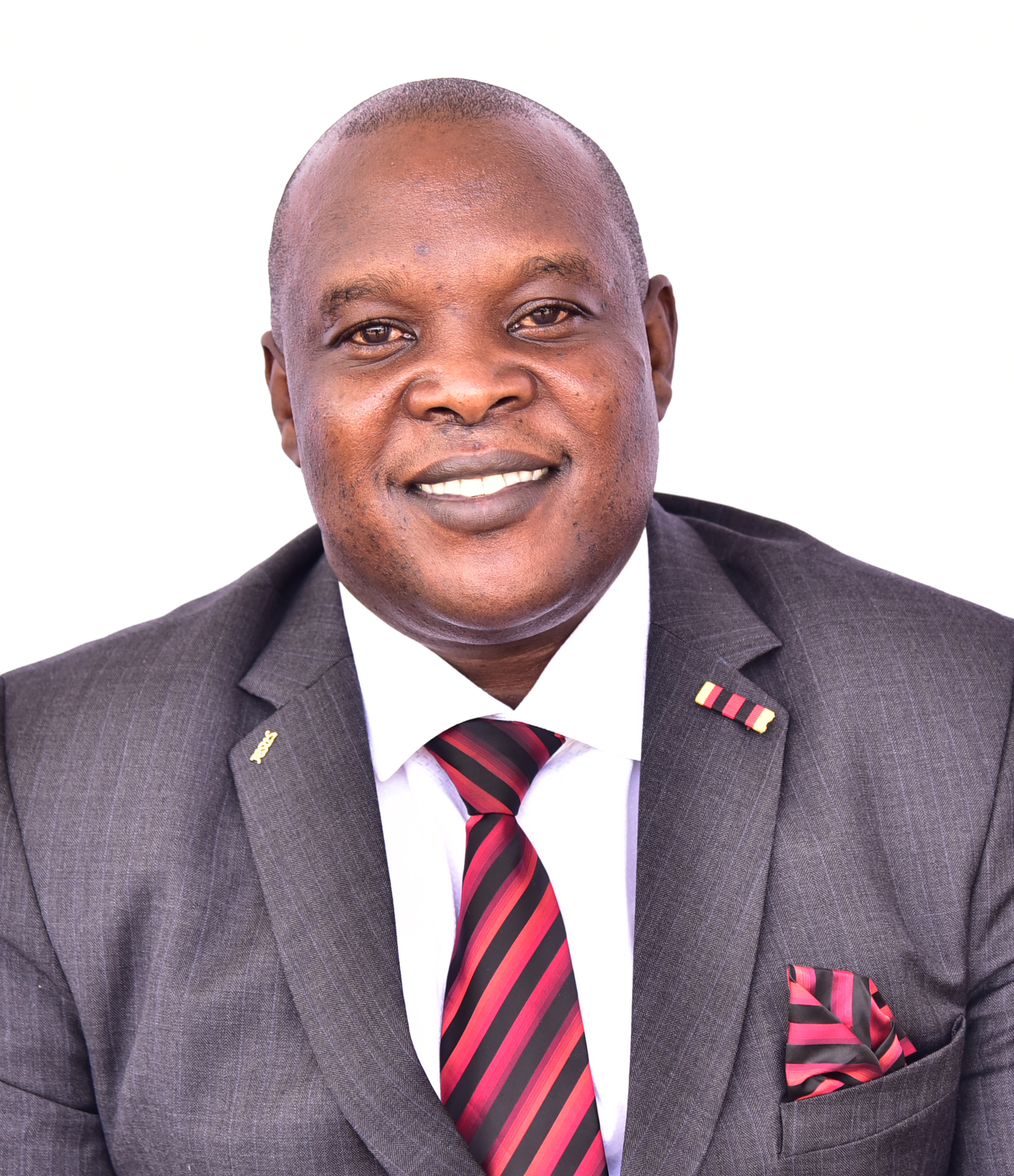
- Ayoo Tonny
- Born: 8 June 1974 (age 52); Apac, Uganda
- Citizenship: Uganda
- Education: Makerere University (Bachelor of Development Studies)
- Occupations: social worker and politician
- Years active: 1998 – present
- Known for: Politics
- Title: Member of Parliament
- Political party: National Resistance Movement

Ayoo Tonny (born 8 June 1974) is a Ugandan social worker and politician. He serves as the Member of Parliament representing Kwania Constituency in the eleventh Ugandan Parliament.

== Early life and education ==
Ayoo was born on 8 June 1974 in Apac District, Uganda. He attended Aduku Secondary School and Apac Secondary School for his secondary education. He holds a Secondary Education Diploma from Lira-Ngenta NTC and a Bachelor of Development Studies from Makerere University.

== Career and political involvement ==
Ayoo left his teaching career after only six months at Apac Secondary School to enter politics in 1998, beginning with service as a local councillor in Apac District. In the 2011 general elections, he ran on the ticket of the ruling National Resistance Movement (NRM) and was elected as the Member of Parliament for Kwania County in Apac District. He won the same position in the 2016 and 2021 elections.

Ayoo was the deputy chairperson of the Committee for the amendments of the Copyright and Neighbouring Rights Act (2006) and he serves as chairperson of the 11th Parliamentary Committee on ICT & National Guidance.

In addition, Ayoo has served as Chairperson of the Parliamentary Committee on East African Affairs and he is member of the Parliamentary Committee on National Economy for the 2024–2026 term. In June 2024, he was appointed Assistant Coordinator for the Patriotic League of Uganda (PLU) in the Lango Sub‑region.
