= Wandera Ogana =

Kenyan Scientist

- Born: May, 1946; Mukhobola, Busia, Kenya
- Occupation: Academic

Academic background
- Education: University of East Africa; Stanford University
- Thesis: Computation of steady two-dimensional transonic flows by an integral equation method; John R. Spreiter (1975)

Academic work
- Discipline: Mathematics
- Sub-discipline: Applied mathematics
- Institutions: University of Nairobi
- Main interests: Computational Fluid Dynamics; Mathematical Modelling

Wandera Ogana is a Kenyan Applied Mathematics professor, a member of African Mathematical Union and a fellow of Kenya National Academy of Sciences.

== Early life and education ==
Wandera was born in Mukhobola, Busia, Kenya in may, 1949. He received his primary school education at Miwani primary school between 1952 and 1966. He attended Nyang'ori Secondary School and Kakamega High School for his secondary school education between 1960-1966. In 1970, He obtained his first degree in Mathematics from the University of East Africa, University College of Nairobi. , In 1973 and 1975, he obtained his Msc and PhD in Mathematics and applied mathematics from the Stanford University,California.

== Career ==
Wandera started his career as mathematics teacher at Maseno Secondary school where he worked for one year. In 1977, he underwent post doctoral Research associate at NASA Ames Research centre Moffett field, California. He returns to Kenya where he became a lecturer at the University of Nairobi. In 1986, he was promoted to senior lecturer, associate professor in 1987 and became a professor in 1991. Between 1983-1982, he was the chairman of the department of mathematic and between 1995-2000, he was the Dean faculty of science at University of Nairobi, Kenya . Apart from scientific activities professor Ogana is a creative writer. In 2015, he was elected as the president of the Commission for Developing Countries (CDC).

== Selected publications ==
- McAvaney, B., Covey, C., Joussaume, S., Kattsov, V., Kitoh, A., Ogana, W., ... & Zhao, Z. C. (2001). Climate change 2001, the scientific basis, chap. 8: model evaluation. Contribution of Working Group I to the Third Assessment Report of the Intergovernmental Panel on Climate Change IPCC
- Ogana, W., Oyieke, H. and Ntiba, M. J., (1998). Aquatic Resources Sector, in F.M. Mutua and F. K. Karanja (eds), Climate Change Impacts, Vulnerability and Adaptation in Kenya, UNDP/GEF Project, RAF/93/G31: Building Capacity in Sub-Sahara Africa to respond to the United Nations Framework Convention on Climate Change (UNFCC)
