= Yovan Adriko =

Ugandan politician

Parliament of Uganda
- In office 2021–2026
- Incumbent: Member of 11th Parliament of Uganda
- Constituency: Vurra County

Personal details
- Party: National Resistance Movement

Yovan Adriko is a Ugandan politician and legislator who has served as the Member of Parliament representing Vurra County, Arua District since 2021. He is a member of the ruling party National Resistance Movement (NRM) political party. In the 11th Parliament of Uganda, he serves on the Committee on Public Accounts (Central Government).

== Early life and education ==
Yovan Adriko was born on 15 December 1980.

== Political career ==
Before entering national politics, Adriko was active in local government. He served as the LCIII Chairman for Logiri Sub County (in present-day Arua District) for 15 years before retiring in 2011. His long tenure in local administration established his grassroots political base in West Nile.

=== NRM Primaries and Parliamentary Elections ===
Adriko first contested the NRM primary for the Vurra County parliamentary seat in 2016, but he reportedly lost the nomination due to failure to meet the required academic qualifications at the time.

He ran again in 2020 NRM primaries, where he scored approximately 7,000 votes, defeating the State Minister for Finance General Duties, Gabriel Ajedra Aridru who polled 5,000 votes. He won in the general election to represent Vurra County in the parliament but his victory was challenged for lack of academic qualification. The academic paper he presented to the Electoral Commission was the November/December 2009 National Examinations result where he recorded F9 (fail) in seven subjects, a pass in Christian Religious Education (CRE) and a credit in History subject. His higher academic paper was questioned as to how he got to the higher level of education without passing his O’Level, a prerequisite for higher qualification.

Adriko subsequently stood in the 2021 general election as the NRM candidate for Vurra County and won the parliamentary seat. His election added to the NRM's parliamentary representation for the West Nile region

=== Parliamentary roles ===
In the 11th Parliament, Adriko is a member of the committee on Public Accounts (Central Government), a key oversight committee in Parliament that reviews government expenditures and audit reports.

As an Mp, he has spoken on national and local issues in parliamentary debates and motions, addressing governance, agriculture, and infrastructure challenges facing his constituency and the country at large.

=== Controversies and legal challenges ===
==== Academic qualification dispute ====
Adriko's academic qualifications became the subject of public debate during and after his 2021 election victory. A leaked Uganda Certificate of Education (UCE) result attributed to him showed that he had failed most subjects except Christian Religious Education and History, raising questions about how he could progress academically to meet the eligibility requirements for parliamentary candidacy, which normally require completion of A-level or equivalent.

Allegations about his academic record prompted local discussions on candidate vetting and the enforcement of educational prerequisites by the Electoral Commission of Uganda.

== See also ==
- List of members of the eleventh Parliament of Uganda
- National Resistance Movement
