= Lokii John Baptist =

Ugandan politician

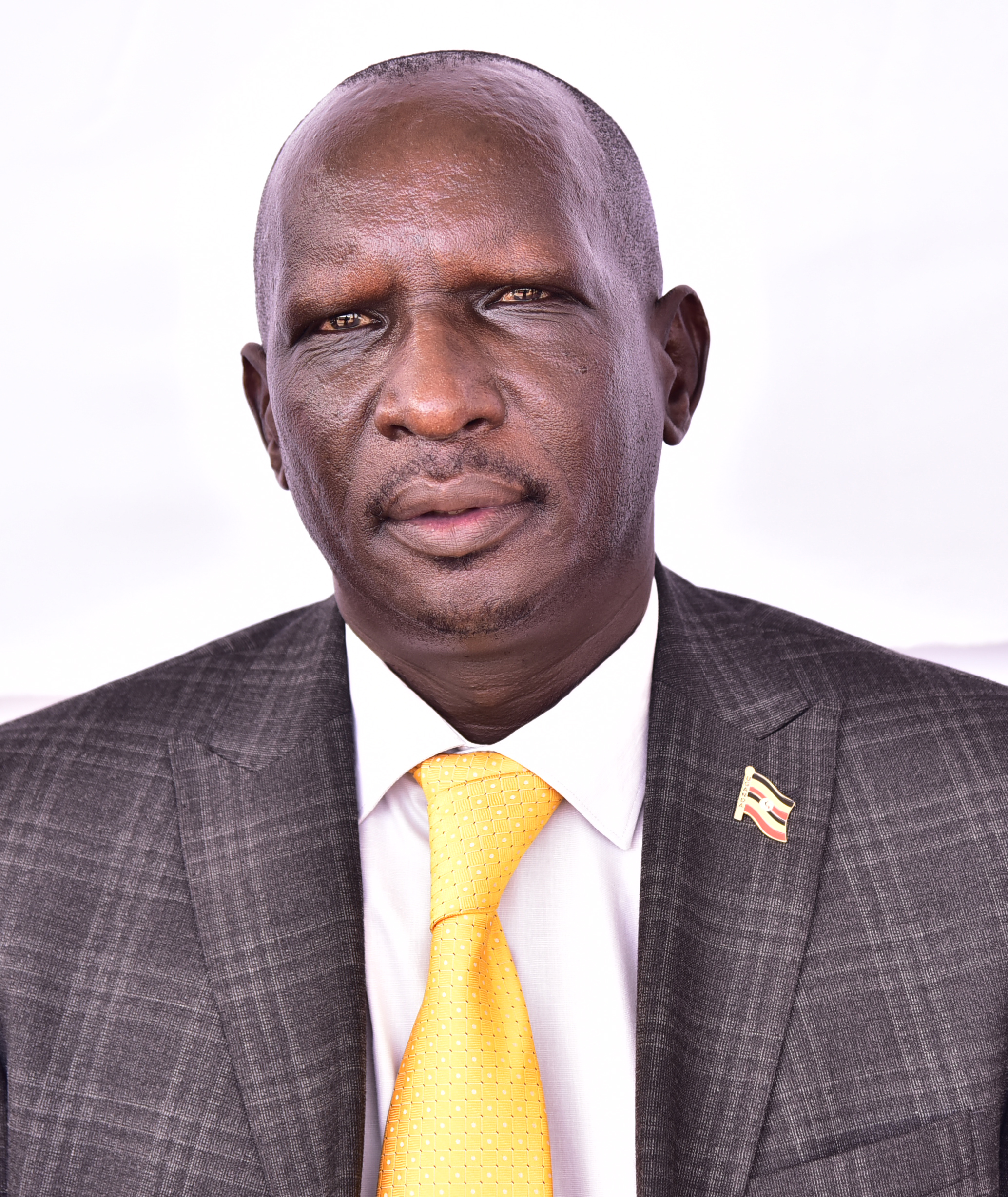
- Lokii John Baptist

Minister of Karamoja Affairs
- In office 2026–2031
- Appointed by: Yoweri Museveni
- Preceded by: Peter Lokeris

Dr. Lokii John Baptist is a Ugandan veterinary doctor, politician and a member of the 12th parliament representing the people of Matheniko County, Moroto district and serves as the National Resistance Movement (NRM) National Vice chairperson for Karamoja region. In May 2026, he was appointed Minister for Karamoja Affairs by President Yoweri Museveni to serve as a cabinet minister for the term 2026–2031.

== Career ==
Dr. Lokii John Baptist serves as the Member of Parliament representing the people of Matheniko County in the 11th Parliament of Uganda and also serves as an Ex Official of Karamoja Peace And Technology University council (KAPATU). He is among the newly appointed ministers to represent Karamoja region as a cabinet minister in the National Resistance Movement government.

== Other Considerations ==
As a leader, Dr. Lokii has intervened in community matters of human trafficking in Karamoja and has contributed to involving relevant authorities including the Parliament of Uganda to address this issue. He has intervened in settling Land deputes in Moroto district by demanding documentation and proof from the Ministry of Works and transport in their efforts to establish Gulu University constituent college in Moroto district since the land was community owned. Lokii also monitors government projects like the Parish Development Model in the Karamoja Sub-region to assess its livelihood performance in the region and report to government on the progress of such programs.

== See also ==
- Peter Lokeris
- Rose Lilly Akello
- Stella Atyang
