= John Byabagambi =

Ugandan engineer and politician

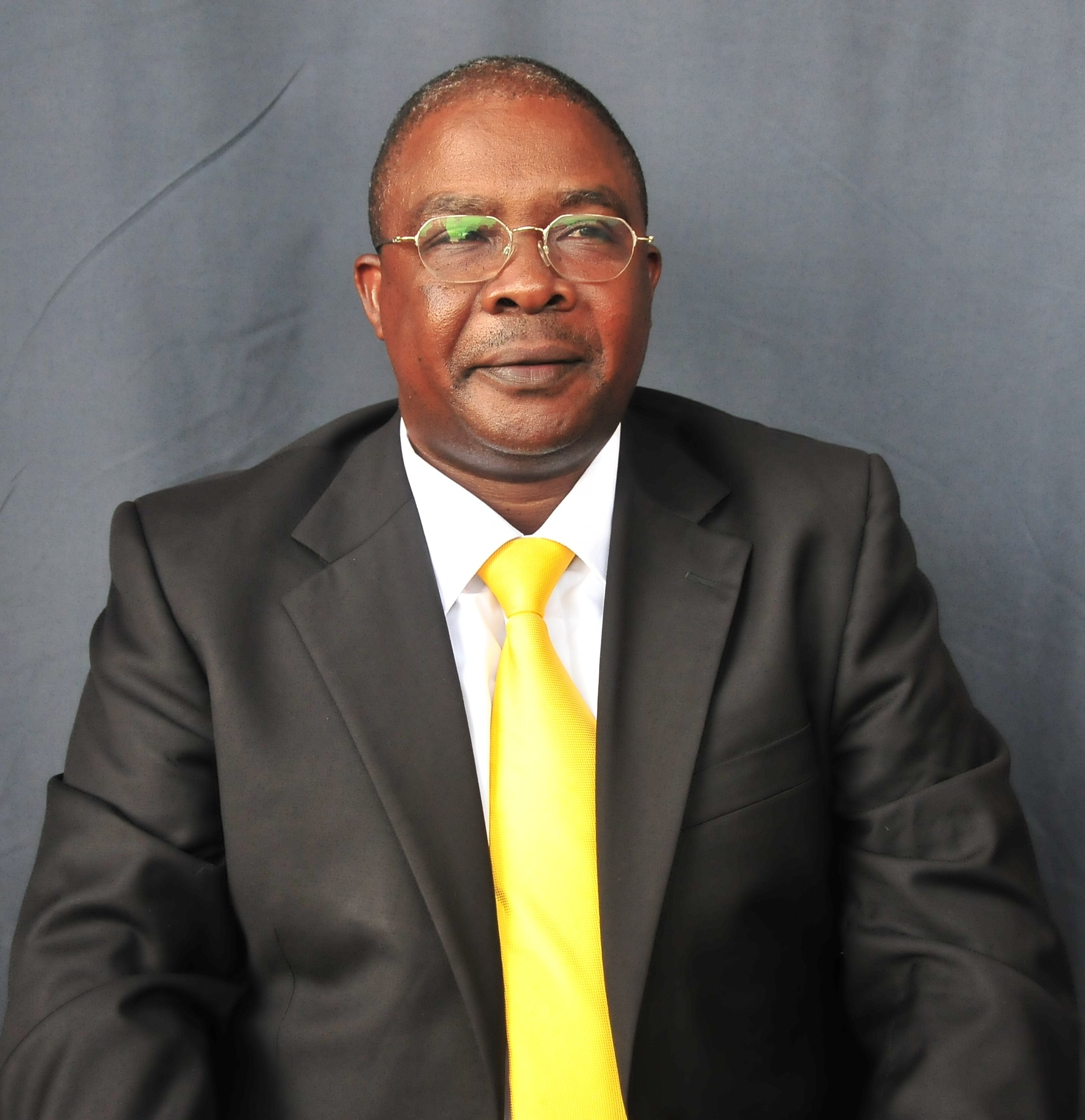
- Born: 8 May 1958 (age 67); Uganda
- Citizenship: Uganda
- Education: Moscow State University of Fine Chemical Technologies (Master of Science); Undisclosed University (Bachelor of Science)
- Occupations: Engineer & Politician
- Years active: 1990 – present
- Known for: Politics
- Title: Cabinet Minister for Karamoja Affairs

John Byabagambi (born 8 May 1958) is a Ugandan engineer and politician. He was the Cabinet Minister for Karamoja Affairs, in the Cabinet of Uganda from 6 June 2016 to 8 June 2021 and was replaced by Mary Goretti Kitutu. He previously served as Minister of Works and Transport between March 2015 and June 2016, replacing Abraham Byandala who was appointed Minister Without Portfolio. He was also the elected Member of Parliament, representing Ibanda County South, Ibanda District. He was first elected to that position in 2001.

== Early life and education ==
John Byabagambi was born in Ibanda District on 8 May 1958. He attended St. Leo's College Kyegobe in Fort Portal, for his O-Level education, graduating in 1973. For his A-Level studies, he studied at St. Henry's College Kitovu in Masaka, graduating in 1979. He holds the degree of Master of Science in Chemical Engineering. The university where he obtained his bachelor's degree is not stated.

== Career ==
Prior to entering politics in 2001, he worked as an Engineer in several private businesses. In 1989, he worked as a Production Engineer at Miroko Industries. From 1991 until 1992, he worked as the General Manager of Mukwano Industries Limited, a member company of the Mukwano Group of Companies. Between 1992 and 2001, he worked as the General manager, Songdol Films Uganda Limited. In 2001, he entered politics and contested the parliamentary seat of Ibanda County South in Ibanda District. He won in 2001 and was re-elected in 2006 on the National Resistance Movement (NRM) political party ticket. After serving as Minister of Works and Transport from 1 March 2015 until 6 June 2016, he was reassigned to Cabinet Minister for Karamoja on 6 June 2016. He left the cabinet on 8 June 2021.

== Personal life ==
He is married. He belongs to the National Resistance Movement political party. His interests include reading and traveling.

== See also ==
- Cabinet of Uganda
- Parliament of Uganda
- Ibanda District
