= Tibasiimwa Joram Ruranga =

Ugandan politician

- Born: 1 January 1943 (age 83); Bushenyi, Uganda
- Citizenship: Uganda
- Education: Mbarara Junior Secondary School
- Alma mater: Makerere University Bachelor’s degree in education
- Occupations: Teacher and politician
- Years active: 1993 – present
- Known for: Politics
- Title: Member of Parliament
- Political party: National Resistance Movement

Tibasiimwa Joram Ruranga also known as Lay Canon Joram Tibasiimwa (born 1 January 1943) is a Ugandan retired teacher and secondary school head teacher. He serves as the Older Persons' Representative - Western region.

== Early life and education ==
Tibasiimwa was born on 1 January 1943, in Rubingo village, Kitwe, Kyeizooba Sub‑County, in what was then the greater Bushenyi district (in the Ankole region of Uganda). He attended Mbarara Junior Secondary School in 1963 and he also studied at Ntare School. For tertiary education, he attended Makerere University, where he studied for a bachelor’s degree in education.

== Educational career ==
After completing his tertiary education at Makerere University (where he obtained a Bachelor in Education), Tibasiimwa began his teaching career in Western Uganda at Ibanda Secondary School in 1968, where he taught for a year. He was then transferred to Mbarara High School, to teach Chemistry.

In 1973‑1975, Tibasiimwa was the acting headmaster of Mbarara High School and he served as the head teacher for Muntuyera High School Kitunga (Kitunga), Ruyonza School (Bushenyi area). In 1991‑2001, Tibasiimwa served as the head teacher for Mbarara High School before retiring in 2002.

== Political involvement ==
Tibasiimwa joined politics in 2002 as Kyeizoba Sub County LC V councilor and went on to become the speaker for Greater Bushenyi. He is currently the chairperson National Council for Older Persons, a position he has held from 2016. He is also the chairperson of Nkore Older Persons Association from 2007 to date.

He is affiliated with the National Resistance Movement (NRM) party and in October 2020, he won the NRM primary to become the flag‑bearer for the Western Region “Older Persons” parliamentary seat (Special Interest Group). Tibasiimwa serves as the Member of Parliament (MP) representing Older Persons for the Western Region and within Parliament, he is a member of the Parliamentary Committee on National Economy.

== Personal life ==
Tibasiimwa is married to Loyce and they have twelve children.
