= Peter Lokeris =

Ugandan politician

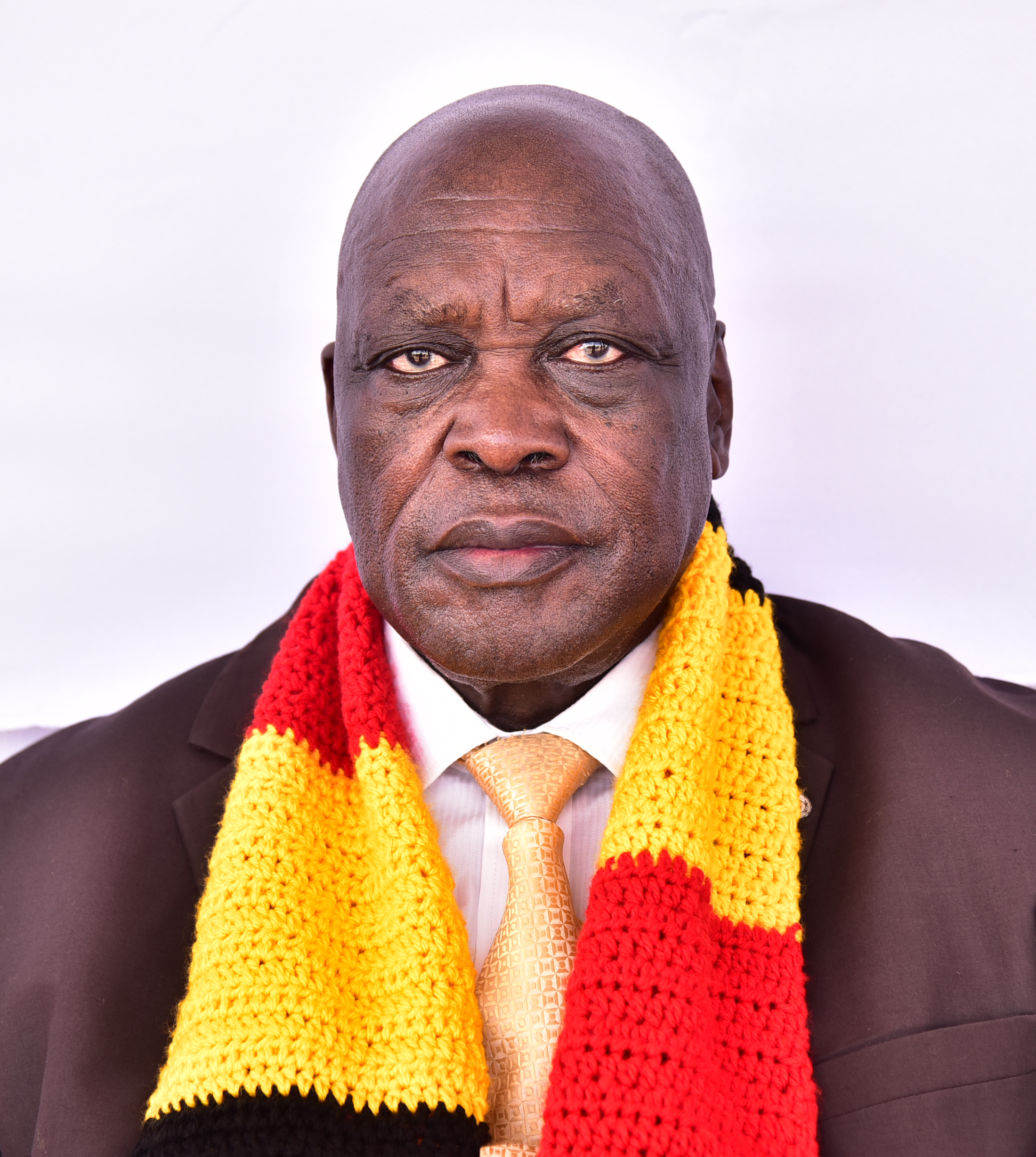
- Born: 2 February 1947 (age 79); Uganda
- Citizenship: Uganda
- Education: Makerere University (Bachelor of Commerce) (Master of Science in Marketing) (Master of Arts in Peace and Conflict Studies); Uganda Management Institute (Diploma in Finance)
- Occupations: Accountant, politician
- Years active: 1976 — present
- Known for: Politics

Peter Aimat Lokeris (born 2 February 1947) is a Ugandan politician and accountant. He was the Minister in charge of Karamoja affairs in the Cabinet of Uganda from 16 February 2009 until the cabinet reshuffle of 26 May 2026. In the cabinet reshuffle of 27 May 2011, and that of 1 March 2015, Peter Lokeris retained his cabinet post. He is also the elected Member of Parliament representing Chekwii County in Nakapiripirit District. He has continuously represented that constituency since 1996.

== Early life and education ==
Peter Lokeris was born on 2 February 1947 in Pian county in Nakapiripirit District to Teko Apo-oroma Namoni-Angitiang and his wife Aisu Elizabeth. He holds the degree of Bachelor of Commerce from Makerere University. He also holds a Diploma in Finance from the Uganda Management Institute in Kampala. He also holds a Master of Science in Marketing from Makerere University and another Master of Arts in Peace and Conflict Studies from the same university.

== Career ==
Peter Lokeris started his working career as a cashier. He also worked as an Internal Auditor for Moroto District. He then worked as the Chief Accountant for Kotido District. Following that, he served as the Administrative Secretary for Moroto District for a period of four years. Lokeris also served as a special district administrator in the districts of Moroto, Kasese and Jinja. Later, he served as a special presidential advisor on peace and development of Karamoja and its neighbouring regions for four years.

In 1996, he entered politics, contesting and winning the parliamentary seat of Chekwii County in Nakapiripirit District. During that same year, he was appointed as Minister of State for Karamoja. He maintained that position during a cabinet reshuffle on 13 January 2005. In 2006, he was re-elected to his parliamentary seat. On 1 June 2006, he was appointed as Minister of State for Primary Education. In another cabinet reshuffle, Peter Lokeris was appointed Minister of State for Minerals on 16 February 2009. Lokeris was re-elected as member of parliament for Chekwi county on 18 February 2011. In the cabinet reshuffle of 27 May 2011, he retained his cabinet post as State Minister for Minerals. He was removed from the cabinet in the reshuffle on 26 May 2026 and was succeeded by Lokii John Baptist.

== Personal life ==
Peter Lokeris is married. He belongs to the National Resistance Movement political party. He enjoys playing and watching basketball. Lokeris is a passionate cattle rancher and has a cattle ranch.

== See also ==
- Cabinet of Uganda
- Parliament of Uganda
- Nakapiripirit District
