= Agnes Taaka =

Ugandan politician and social worker

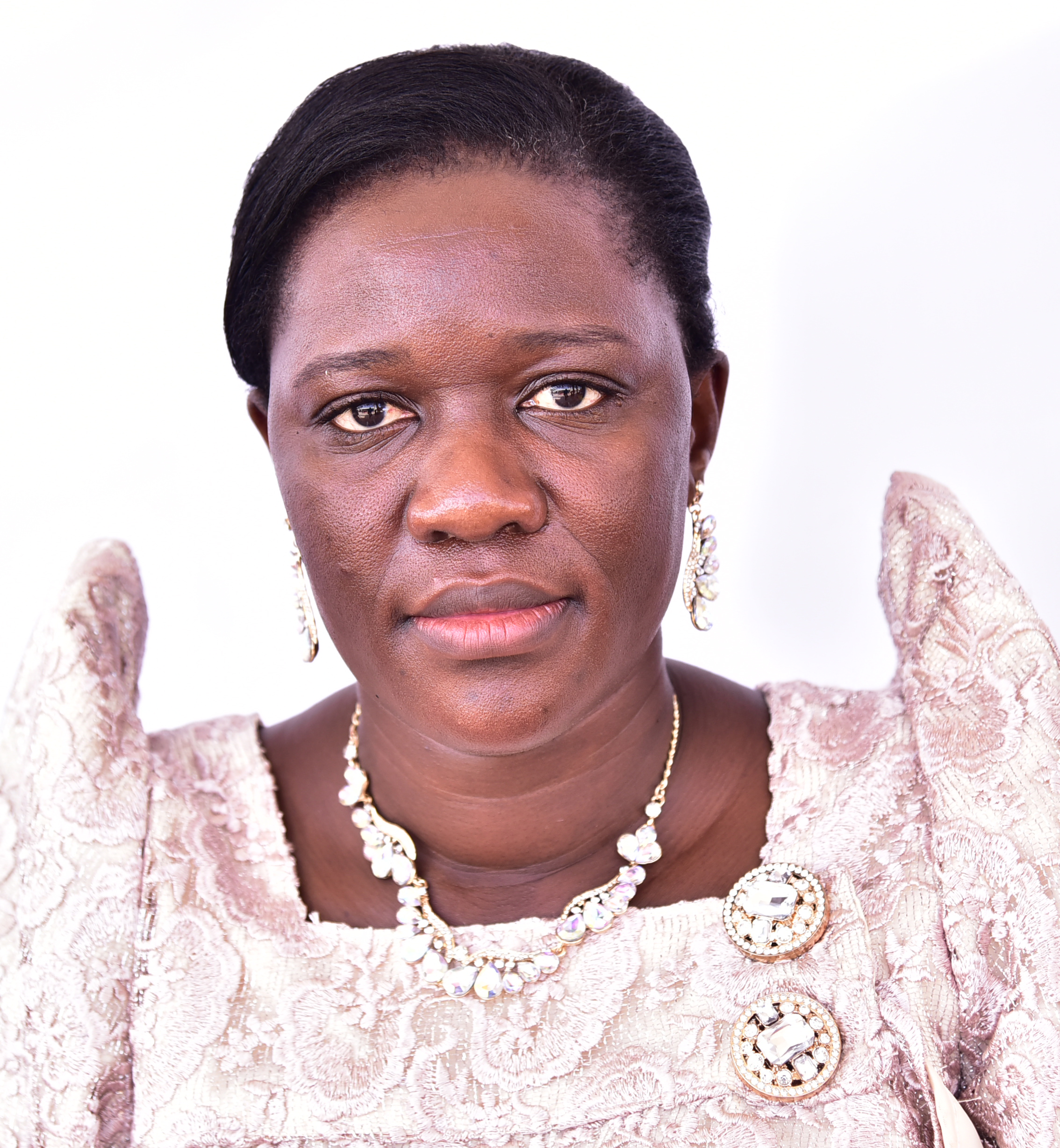
- Born: 3 April 1980 (age 46); Bugiri District
- Citizenship: Ugandan
- Education: Kigulu Girls Primary school Bukoyo Senior Secondary School; Iganga Senior Secondary School
- Alma mater: Makerere University; Law Development Centre
- Occupations: Politician, Social Worker, and Legislator
- Employer(s): Bugiri District Local Government; Bugiri Town Council; Taaka Agnes Wejuli Development Foundation; Parliament of Uganda
- Political party: National Resistance Movement

Agnes Taaka also known as Taaka Agnes Wejuli (born 3 April 1980) is a Ugandan politician, social worker, and legislator. She is the district woman representative of Bugiri District. She served in the ninth, tenth and eleventh Parliament of Uganda as the Member of Parliament. She belongs to the ruling political party, National Resistance Movement. She is the current Woman Member of Parliament of Bugiri District in period (2021-2026) after being declared as winner in the just concluded presidential and parliamentary elections in Uganda. However, she lost the 2025 NRM primaries to Namatende Eunice.

== Early life and education ==
Agnes Taaka was born on 3 April 1980. She completed her Primary Leaving Examinations from Kigulu Girls Primary school in 1992 and later joined Bukoyo Senior Secondary School for her Uganda Certificate of Education in 1996. In 1999, Agnes joined Iganga Senior Secondary School for Uganda Advanced Certificate of Education (UACE). She was awarded a bachelor's degree of Arts in Social Science from Makerere University in 2004. Additionally in 2007, she went to advance her studies and was awarded a certificate in Law (Administrative Officers Law Course) from Law Development Centre, Kampala. She is married.

== Work experience before politics ==
Between 2006 and 2014, Agnes worked as the Community Development Officer at Bugiri District Local Government and was later promoted to Senior Community Development Officer in Bugiri Town Council and worked from 2014 to 2015. From 2010 to 2012, she was later appointed as the Acting Sub-County Chief of Bugiri District Local Government. She leads Taaka Agnes Wejuli Development Foundation.

== Political career ==
From 2016 to date, she has served as the Woman Member of Parliament for Bugiri Constituency. During her service as the Member of Parliament at the Parliament of Uganda, Agnes has served an additional role as the Committee on Agriculture. Her hobbies are netball, and dancing; and she has special interest in mentoring poor households, community groups and youths. She joined the Uganda Women Parliamentary Association (UWOPA) in the 10th parliament. At Uganda Women Parliamentary Association (UWOPA), she serves on the committee of the Employment Act/Economic Empowerment, which is a collaboration With Civil Society As A Mechanism For Conducting Advocacy in the Four Main Strategic Directions.

== See also ==
- List of members of the eleventh Parliament of Uganda
- List of members of the tenth Parliament of Uganda
- List of members of the ninth Parliament of Uganda
- Bugiri District
- National Resistance Movement
- Member of Parliament
- Parliament of Uganda
