= Ik county =

Ugandan county

Ik county is a county in the Kaabong District in northeast Uganda. The county was established in 2015 to signal that the land belongs to the Ik people. The county is inhabited by several ethnic groups, including the Ik people, Dodoth people, and the Teso people.

== History ==
Ik county was created out of a part of Dodoth East County in July 2015, as part of a government resolution designating 65 new constituencies. In September 2015, Uganda Radio Network reported that area leaders of the Ik community were advocating for the establishment of an Ik county to represent the Ik community.

== Geography ==
The county is located in the northeast of Uganda and borders the Turkana County of Kenya and Eastern Equatoria in South Sudan.

=== Subcounties ===
There are three sub-counties of Ik county:

- Kamion subcounty
- Morungole subcounty
  - Korumo village
- Timu subcounty

== Demographics ==
The European Union Election Observation Mission noted only 2,051 voters for the 2016 election.

According to the Uganda Bureau of Statistics, in 2017, the county had a population of 4,023 people. According to the 2024 National Population and Housing Census in Uganda, the county had a population of 17,872 in 2,783 households.

== Economy ==
Ik County lacks network infrastructure, which isolates it from the rest of Uganda's mobile economy.

== Education ==
In 2020, The Independent (Uganda) reported that Ik County had two primary schools and four community schools, and by 2025 the Daily Monitor reported there were 3 community primary schools. A 2018 report indicated that the Ik constituency was allotted funds to construct secondary schools.

Some of the government-funded schools are as far as 45 km away from communities, making education inaccessible for much of the population.

Some of the known schools are:

- Timu Primary School, in Timu Subcounty
- Kamion Primary School, in Kamion Subcounty
- Ik Seed Secondary School, in Kamion Subcounty.

== Health ==
According to a Daily Monitor report from 2025, of the three subcounties in Ik County, only Kamion subcounty possesses a Level II Health Centre. As of May 2025, the facility was staffed by only one midwife, Anna Grace Lochoro. Timu and Murungole have only lower-tier health facilities which can sometimes be as far as 10 to 20 kilometers away.
