= Kevinah Taaka Wanaha Wandera =

Ugandan politician

Kevinah Taaka Wanaha Wandera is a Ugandan politician who has previously served as the Member of Parliament for Busia Municipality, Busia District. She was elected to that position under the flag of the Forum for Democratic Change (FDC) in 2011 but lost in the 2016 general election to Geoffrey Macho of the NRM. She also served as the shadow minister for Trade, Industry and Co-operatives from 2011 until 2016.

== Committees ==
During her term in Parliament, Taaka served on multiple committees, such as:

- Committee on Tourism, Trade and Industry
- Committee on HIV/AIDS and Related Matters
