= Nancy Acora =

Ugandan politician

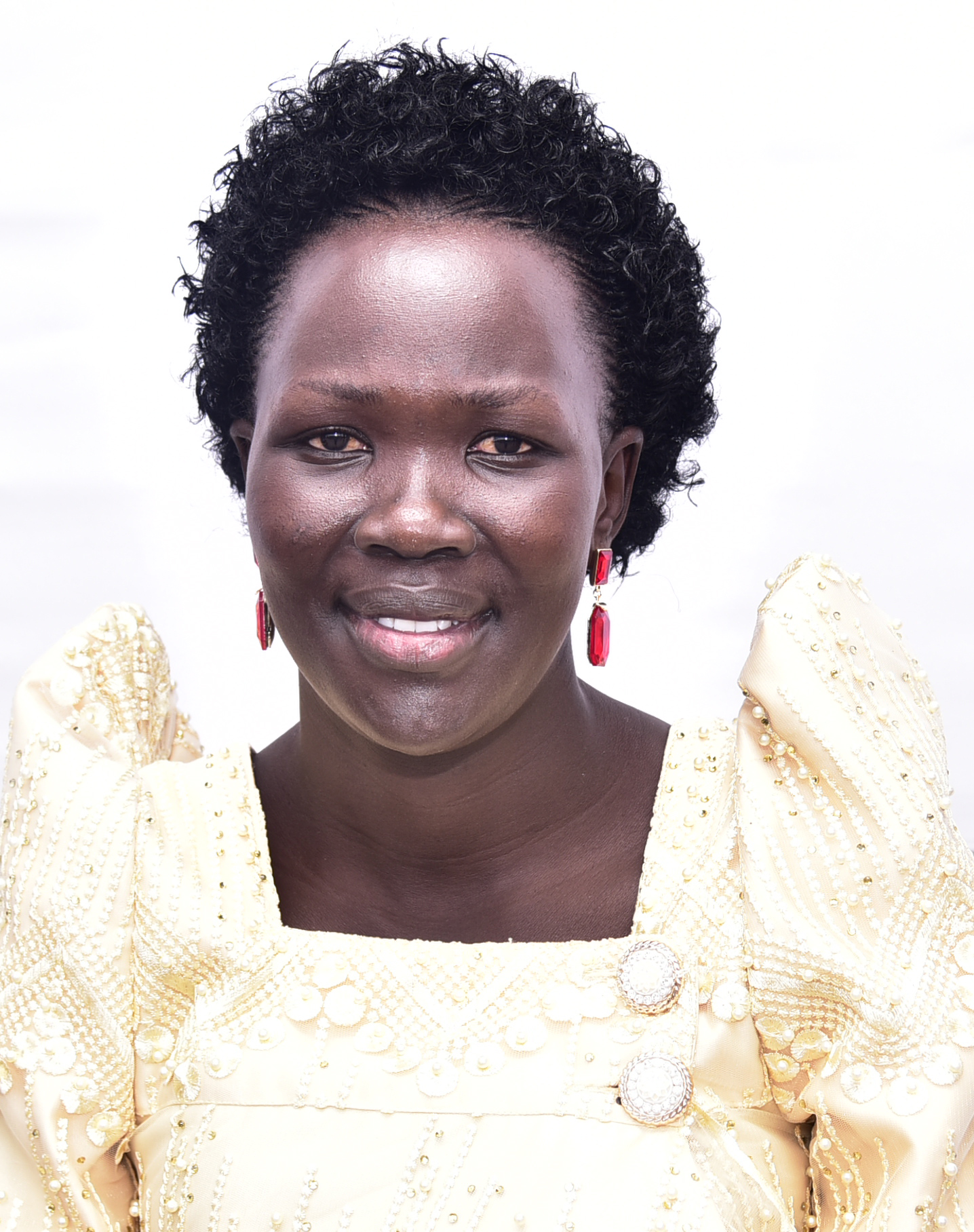

Woman Member of Parliament for Lamwo District
- Incumbent
- Assumed office 2021

Personal details
- Party: Independent
- Spouse: Odonga Patrick
- Children: O'Mara Marvin, Rwotokonya Arthur, Nyakoke Leticia
- Occupation: Politician, legislator
- Committees: Presidential Affairs Committee

Nancy Acora is a Ugandan politician and legislator. She represents the people of Lamwo district as woman MP in the parliament of Uganda. she is currently married to Odonga Patrick with 3 children namely O'Mara Marvin, Rwotokonya Arthur and Nyakoke Leticia .

== Background ==
Acora is an independent member of parliament, she entered parliament after defeating the former member of parliament Molly Lanyero of the National Resistance Movement party.

After the elections, Lanyero was discontented and lodged an election petition against Acora. Acora at the end of the process won the election petition in September 2021.

== Career ==
In the parliament of Uganda, Acora serves as a member of the presidential affairs committee. She supports community programs and advocacy initiatives to reduce teenage pregnancies in her constituency.

== Controversy ==
A petition to challenge her election was dismissed by the High-Court in Gulu citing no irregularities were observed.

== See also ==
- Anita Among
- Gilbert Olanya
- Santa Okot
