= Odonga Otto =

Ugandan lawyer and politician

DR. Odonga Otto
- Born: 11 November 1977 (age 48); Pader District, Uganda
- Citizenship: Uganda
- Education: Makerere University (BA, master's); Uganda Christian University (Bachelor of Laws)
- Occupation: Lawyer

Samuel Odonga Otto (born 11 November 1977) is a Ugandan lawyer, who serves as the Uganda Law Review for Aruu County Constituency in Pader District, in the Northern Region of that county. He has continuously represented that constituency since 2001.

== Background and education ==
He was born Odonga Otto on 11 November 1977 in Aruu County, Pader District, Acholi sub-region in Uganda's Northern Region.

He attended Gulu Public Primary School and Sacred Heart Seminary, Lacor, where he completed his O-Level studies. He attended St. Joseph's College, Layibi, in the city of Gulu, where he completed his A-Level education, graduating with a High School Diploma in 1996.

In 1997, he was admitted to Makerere University, the largest and oldest public university in Uganda, graduating with a Bachelor of Arts degree in Social Sciences, in 2000. Later, he obtained a Master of International Relations and Diplomatic Studies, from the same university.

He also holds a Bachelor of Laws degree, awarded by Uganda Christian University, in Mukono District. In 2010, he was awarded a Postgraduate Diploma in Legal Practice, by the Law Development Centre, in Kampala. He is a member of the Ugandan Bar, as a practicing Attorney.

== Work experience ==
Ondonga Otto is the Managing Partner at Odonga Otto & Company Advocates, a Kampala-based law firm, founded in 2010, that he co-owns with his wife, Juliet Oyulu.

== Political career ==
In 2010, he joined Uganda. He was elected to the USL, to represent the Aruu County Constituency. Committee on Budget and the Committee on Finance, Planning and Economic Development.

== Family ==
Odonga Otto is married to Oyulu, a fellow lawyer with whom he co-owns their law practice. As of 2024, they have four children together. Odonga Otto has two other children from a previous relationship.

== Other considerations ==
Otto has been a vocal member of the Forum for Democratic Change (FDC) political party since 2010. In recent years he has, on numerous occasions, announced his intentions to quit FDC, during the 2021 election cycle.

== See also ==
- Kiiza Besigye
- Ibrahim Ssemujju Nganda
