= Committee on Equal Opportunities (Uganda) =

Committee of the Parliament of Uganda

- Coat of arms of Uganda

Standing committee overview
- Jurisdiction: Government of Uganda
- Headquarters: Parliament of Uganda, Kampala, Uganda; 0.315°N 32.582°E
- Standing committee executives: Hon. Judith Alyek, Chairperson; Hon. Dorcus Acen, Deputy Chairperson
- Parent department: Parliament of Uganda
- Website: Official website

The Committee on Equal Opportunities is a standing committee of the Parliament of Uganda which was established to monitor, promote and review policies and programmes aimed at ensuring equality and non‑discrimination in Uganda. The committee is one of the many parliamentary committees mandated to provide oversight of government functions, legislation and public policies.

== Mandate and functions ==
The Committee on Equal Opportunities has the following key roles:

- To monitor and promote measures designed to enhance the equalization of opportunities and improve the quality of life and status of all persons, particularly marginalized groups, on grounds such as gender, age, disability, or any other reason created by history, tradition or custom.
- To examine Bills, policies, programme proposals and budget estimates to determine whether they uphold the principles of non‑discrimination and affirmative action.
- To engage in oversight of government ministries, departments and agencies with respect to equal opportunities issues, including calling in officials for hearings, reviewing reports and making recommendations.

== Status ==
The committee is classified as a standing committee. Standing committees are reconstituted every two and a half years and typically comprise about 30 members selected by party whips.

== Membership and leadership ==
The Parliament maintains an official roster of members and leadership for the committee. Recent listings identify Judith Alyek as chairperson, Dorcus Acen as the deputy chairperson with other members drawn from multiple parties and regions. The Parliament's site also hosts the current membership list as a downloadable attachment. NRM (21) NUP (5) FDC (3) DP (1) Independents (6) = 36 members

Party-wise membership of Committee on Equal Opportunities (2021–2026)
1. NRM (58.3%)
2. Independents (16.7%)
3. FDC (8.33%)
4. NUP (13.9%)
5. DP (2.78%)

Membership of the Committee on Equal Opportunities (2021–2026)
| Photo | Name | Constituency | Party |
|---|---|---|---|
| | Bigirwa Norah Nyendohwa | DWR Buliisa | NRM |
| | Lubega Sempa Bashir | Mubende Municipality | NRM |
| | Laker Sharon | DWR Aswa | NRM |
| | Ssentayi Mohamad | Bukoto West | NRM |
| | Ogwal Moses | Dokolo North | NRM |
| | Biraaro Ephraim | Buhweju West County | NRM |
| | Bwiire Sanon Nadeeba | Bulamogi County | NRM |
| | Kunihira Abwoli Agnes | Workers Rep | NRM |
| | Bainomugisha Jane | DWR Ibanda | NRM |
| | Otukol Sam | Pallisa County | NRM |
| | Agasha J Bashiisha | DWR Mitooma | NRM |
| | Chelangat Alinga Solomon | T'oo County | NRM |
| | Chelimo Reuben Paul | Kongasis County | NRM |
| | Ezama Siraji Brahan | Aringa County | NRM |
| | Kabahenda Flavia Rwabuhoro | DWR Kyegegwa | NRM |
| | Lamwaka Catherine | DWR Omoro | NRM |
| | Mutiwa Geoffrey | Bunyole West County | NRM |
| | Kintu Alex Brandon | Kagoma North County | NRM |
| | Katali Loy | DWR Jinja | NRM |
| | Kayogera Yona | Busiki North County | NRM |
| | Nyakikngoro Rosemary | DWR Sheema | NRM |
| | Thembu Gideon Mujungu | Busongora South County | NRM |
| | Kangwagye Stephen Rwakanuma | Bukanga County | Independents |
| | Komol Emmanuel | Dodoth East County | Independents |
| | Musa Noah | Koboko County North | Independents |
| | Were Godfrey Oder | Samia-Bugwe South | Independents |
| | Miriam Mukyaye | DWR Mbale | Independents |
| | Nantaba Idah Erios | DWR Kayunga | Independents |
| | Apolot Stella Isodo | DWR Ngora | FDC |
| | Busingye Joab | Masindi Municipality | FDC |
| | Isabirye David Iga | Jinja North | FDC |
| | Okot Peter | Tochi County | DP |
| | Mukasa Aloysius Talton | Rubaga South | NUP |
| | Nakabuye Juliet Kakande | Masaka District | NUP |
| | Kabuye Frank | Kassanda South | NUP |
| | Nandagire Christine N. | Bukomansimbi North | NUP |
| | Sekabira Denis | Katikamu North | NUP |

== Activities ==
- The committee has engaged in reviewing reports and legislation such as those of the Equal Opportunities Commission and has required agencies to appear before it to account for their performance on equal opportunities issues.
- It features in resource documents as playing a role in gender‑responsive budgeting and oversight of equalization measures.

== See also ==
- Parliament of Uganda
- Public Accounts Committee (Uganda)
- Committee on National Economy (Uganda)
- Committee on Commissions, Statutory Authorities and State Enterprises
- Committee on Climate Change (Uganda)
