= Patrick Ogwang Obura =

Member of Parliament for Oyam South
- Incumbent
- Assumed office 2026
- Preceded by: Betty Amongi
- Constituency: Oyam South

Personal details
- Party: National Resistance Movement (NRM)
- Education: MA in International Relations and Diplomatic Studies, Makerere University
- Profession: Politician, Accountant
- Known for: Chairperson of Lango Parliamentary Group

Patrick Ogwang Obura is a Ugandan politician and accountant who was elected member of parliament for Oyam South in the twelfth parliament of Uganda under the National Resistance Movement (NRM) Political party.

== Education ==
Patrick holds a Master of Arts in International Relations and Diplomatic Studies from Makerere University.

== Career ==
Ogwang was sworn in as a member of parliament for Oyam South in the 12th Parliament of Uganda. During his swearing-in celebration, he was praised for promoting unity and development in Oyam South. In 2021, he contested for a seat in parliament for Oyam South as a member of Parliament but lost to Betty Amongi.

He declared his interest in serving as the Deputy Speaker of the 12th Parliament of Uganda. He is the NRM cadre. Patrick was elected as the new Chairperson of the Lango parliamentary group, where he promised to foster collaboration among members, advocate for policies to uplift the Lango sub-region, and ensure the group remains influential in national decision-making for the betterment of the Lango community. Obura succeeded the Kole District Woman member of Parliament Judith Alyek, who chaired the 11th Parliament caucus (2021–2026). The elected Vice Chairperson of the Lango Parliamentary group is the Amolatar District Woman Member of Parliament, Janet Auma Okao, who secured 15 votes and defeated Dokolo South County Member of Parliament, Vincent Opito, who garnered 10 votes. The Lango Parliamentary Group comprises 31 legislators representing constituencies across districts in the sub-region, including Oyam, Dokolo, Kole, Lira, Alebtong, Amolatar, Apac, Otuke, and Kwania, to collectively advance socio-economic development and regional interests. Patrick met President Museveni at State House Nakasero on 27 April 2026, ahead of the swearing-in of the president and members of parliament, which shows unity and safeguarding national progress. As the Oyam South member of Parliament, he made a comment regarding the growth of the speaker's budget and said, "We come to show solidarity with Ugandans that we, the young people, cannot sit back and watch a Parliament of Uganda that has a questionable reputation, where the public has lost confidence".

In 2024, during the campaign period, he repaired a borehole in Minakulu Sub-County, which is accessed by over 4000 people in the community, in addition to about 38 boreholes repaired by Patrick Ogwang Obura, the three town councils and five sub-counties in Oyam South constituency, with an aim of boosting access to clean water. He has also secured scholarships for 30 students from the Oyam South constituency to pursue higher education at various universities in Uganda, benefiting people from Loro, Minakulu, Myene, Kamdini, Aber, and the greater Oyam area.

== See also ==
- List of members of the twelfth Parliament of Uganda
- Eunice Apio Atuku
- Alum Sandra Ogwang Santa
- Betty Amongi
- Oyam District
- Kwania District
