= Owiny Akullu =

Lango warrior

- Born: 1845; Acutanana, Kamdini sub-county, Oyam District, Uganda
- Died: 1947 (aged 102) Uganda
- Allegiance: Lango people
- Branch: Local militia / Private battalion
- Service years: Unknown–1899
- Rank: Commander
- Conflicts: Battle of Minakulu; Resistance alongside Kabalega of Bunyoro
- Awards: Commemorated by statue (2019)
- Other work: Local leadership, resistance figure

Owiny Akullu (born in 1845) was a Lango warrior who played a significant role in the resistance against colonialism in Uganda. He was born in Acutanana, Kamdini sub-county, Oyam District to Ogwang Akota and his wife Akullu.

Owiny rose to prominence as a military leader, amassing a private battalion of more than 150 troops and conquering the entire region of Lango. He was so skilled in javelin that he would throw a spear at a thin line of rope from a distance and would hardly miss. In a singular engagement known as the Battle of Minakulu, Owiny achieved a significant victory in the battle of Minakulu, where he defeated the Acholi and seized the area between Kamdini and Bobi in present-day Gulu District.

== Early life ==
Owiny Akullu was born in 1845 in Acutanana, Kamdini sub-county, Oyam District to Ogwang Akota and his wife. Akullu grew up to become a formidable military leader. He was able to assemble a private battalion of over 150 troops, with whom he successfully conquered the entirety of Lango.

== Military contribution ==
Owiny Akullu is indeed remembered for his military contributions to the resistance against British colonial forces in Uganda. He was a prominent commander and ally of Omukama Kabalega, the former King of the Bunyoro kingdom, who British colonial rule. Akullu fought alongside Kabalega and supported his resistance efforts until Kabalega's capture in 1899, which marked a significant turning point in the colonial conquest of Bunyoro. His legacy lives on as a symbol of resilience and resistance against colonial oppression in Uganda.

== Legacy ==
Owiny died in 1947 at the age of 102. In 2019, a statue commemorating Owiny Akullu was erected in Kamdini sub-county, Oyam District, Uganda, to recognize his role in resisting colonial rule. Owiny Akullu is celebrated as a local hero for his contributions to the fight against colonialism, and this statue serves as a tribute to his legacy and impact on Ugandan history.

== See also ==
- Lango people
- Milton Obote
