= Eunice Otuko Apio =

- Born: Oyam District
- Citizenship: Ugandan
- Education: Makerere University St Mary's Aboke Girls Tororo Girls' School
- Years active: 2000-Date
- Employer: Government of Uganda
- Organization(s): Facilitation for Peace and Development
- Predecessor: Charles Engola
- Political party: Uganda People's Congress

Eunice Otuko Apio (born in 1975) is a Ugandan politician, author, academic researcher, and human rights and peace activist. She is a member of the Uganda People's Congress (UPC) who became the representative of Oyam North Constituency in the 11th Parliament of Uganda after winning a by-election on July 6, 2023.She is also a Member of Parliament for Oyam North Constituency in the 12th Parliament of Uganda. She is a founder of Facilitation for Peace and Development.

== Early life and education ==
Apio was born in Oyam District in a family of nine siblings. She went to St Mary's Aboke Girls for her primary education before joining Tororo Girls' School in 1992 for her secondary education, which was completed in 1996. She joined Makerere University where she graduated with a bachelor's degree in Sciences. She is a Research Fellow in Gender and Transnational Justice from the University of Birmingham, United Kingdom.

== Career ==
After graduating from Makerere University, she worked as a development consultant at local government offices. In 2000, she joined the Uganda Human Right Commission a job she quit after two months to start her own human rights organization called Facilitation for Peace and Development. She was involved in the disarmament, reintegration and demobilisation programs in Northern Uganda.

She serves as the Oyam County North woman member of parliament after the by-election after the death of Charles Engola. The swearing in ceremony was held on 20 July 2023.

Apio has also been a human rights activist and peace advocate in Northern Uganda in Districts of Lira, Oyam County since 2006 after the incident of the Lord Resistance Army.

== Awards and nominations ==
- Janzi Award Winner for the book (Zura Maid).
- Nominated for 2022 Women Building Peace Award.
- Marie Curie Fellowship Award.

== See also ==
- Anita Among
- Charles Engola
- Alum Sandra Ogwang Santa
- Amongi Betty
