= Palenga, Uganda =

Palenga
- Location in Uganda
- Coordinates: 02°34′35″N 32°21′16″E
- Country: Uganda
- Region: Northern Region
- Sub-region: Acholi sub-region
- District: Omoro District

Palenga is a town in the Omoro District in the Northern Region of Uganda. It is the site of the district headquarters.

== Location ==
Palenga is approximately 24 kilometres (15 mi), by road, south of Gulu, the nearest large city. This is approximately 311 kilometres (193 mi), by road, north of Kampala, the capital and largest city of Uganda. The geographical coordinates of Palenga, Uganda are:02°34'35.0"N, 32°21'16.0"E (Latitude:2.576389; Longitude:32.354444).

== Overwiew ==
Palenga lies on the Kamdini–Gulu Road, which passes through the town in a general south to north direction.

== See also ==
- Bobi, Uganda
