= Alum Sandra Ogwang Santa =

Ugandan Politician

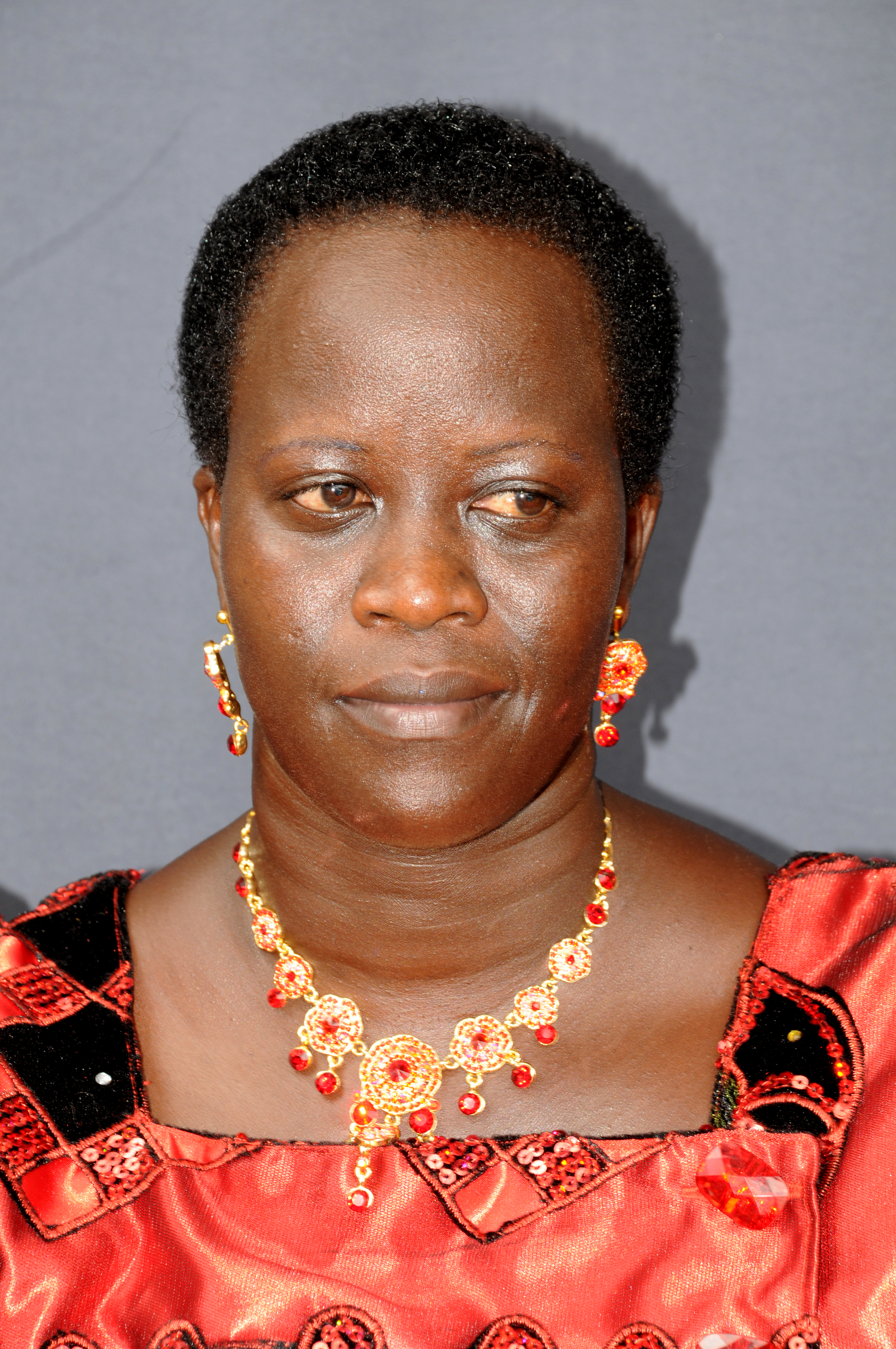
- Born: 2 December 1972 (age 53); Oyam District
- Education: Anai primary school Ikwera girls secondary school Bombo senior secondary school
- Alma mater: Makerere University
- Occupations: social scientist, politician and legislator
- Political party: Uganda People's Congress

Alum Santa Ogwang, also known as Alum Sandra Santa Ogwang (born 2 December 1972), is a Ugandan social scientist, politician and legislator. She represents the people of Oyam District as the district Woman Representative in the twelfth Parliament of Uganda. She is a member of the Uganda People's Congress ( UPC), a party under the chairmanship of Jimmy Akena, son of the former president Apollo Milton Obote. She was appointed Minister of State for Economic Monitoring in the Office of the President by President Yoweri Museveni in May 2026. As the minister, she will oversee the monitoring of government projects, policy implementation, and economic performance across the country to ensure transparency and accountability.

== Early life and education ==
Alum was born on 2 December 1972. She started her primary education at Anai Primary School, where she sat her primary leaving examinations (PLE) in 1987. She thereafter enrolled at Ikwera Girls Secondary School for her O-level education, where she completed her Uganda Certificate of Education (UCE) in 1990. She then joined Bombo Senior Secondary School for her A-level education, where she completed her Uganda Advanced Certificate of Education (UACE) in 1994. She attended Makerere University, where she graduated with a bachelor's degree in library and information science in 1998. She later earned a master's degree in gender studies from the same university in 2010.

== Career ==
Alum serves as director/secretary of Sysplus Limited from 1998 to date. From 2005 to 2006, she was a data entrant at Makerere University She was also a member of Oyam District public accounts committee from 2006 to 2010. In 1998, she was a teacher at Almond College in Lira.

She has been a member of the Parliament of Uganda from 2011 to the present. In parliament, she is the Uganda People's Congress (UPC) party whip, and she also serves on the Business Committee and the Committee on Agriculture. She is also a member of the Uganda Women Parliamentary Association (UWOPA).

Alum Santa is a member of the Uganda Parliamentary Forum on Social Protection (UPFSP), which advocates for social protection, especially for the most vulnerable sections of Uganda's population. She was appointed as Minister of State for Economic Monitoring in the Office of the President in the twelfth Parliament by President Yoweri Museveni.

== See also ==
- Parliament of Uganda
- List of members of the ninth Parliament of Uganda
- List of members of the tenth Parliament of Uganda
- List of members of the twelfth Parliament of Uganda
- Oyam District
- Charles Okello Engola
- Ongom Amongi Betty
- Patrick Ogwang Obura
