= Kamdini–Gulu Road =

Road in Uganda

Route information
- Length: 38.5 mi (62.0 km)
- History: Designated in 2014; Expected completion in 2016

Major junctions
- South end: Kamdini
- Bobi
- North end: Gulu

Location
- Country: Uganda

Highway system
- Roads in Uganda

The Kamdini–Gulu Road, also known as the Gulu–Kamdini Road, is a road in the Northern Region of Uganda, connecting the town of Kamdini with Gulu, the largest city in the Northern Region.

== Location ==
The road starts at Kamdini, in Oyam District, and continues northwards through Bobi, ending in Gulu in Gulu District, a distance of approximately 64 kilometres (40 mi). The road is part of the Kampala to Juba transportation corridor. The coordinates of the road near Parlenga are 2°34'37.0"N, 32°21'14.0" (Latitude:2.576944; Longitude:32.353896).

== Upgrading to bitumen ==
The government of Uganda earmarked this road for upgrading through the conversion of the existing gravel road to bitumen surface and the building of bridges and drainage channels. The contract was awarded to the China Communications Construction Company at a budgeted cost of USh62 billion. Work commenced in April 2014, with completion expected in 2016.

== See also ==
- List of roads in Uganda
- Transportation in Uganda
- Economy of Uganda
- Uganda National Roads Authority
