= Catherine Lamwaka =

Ugandan politician (born 1983)

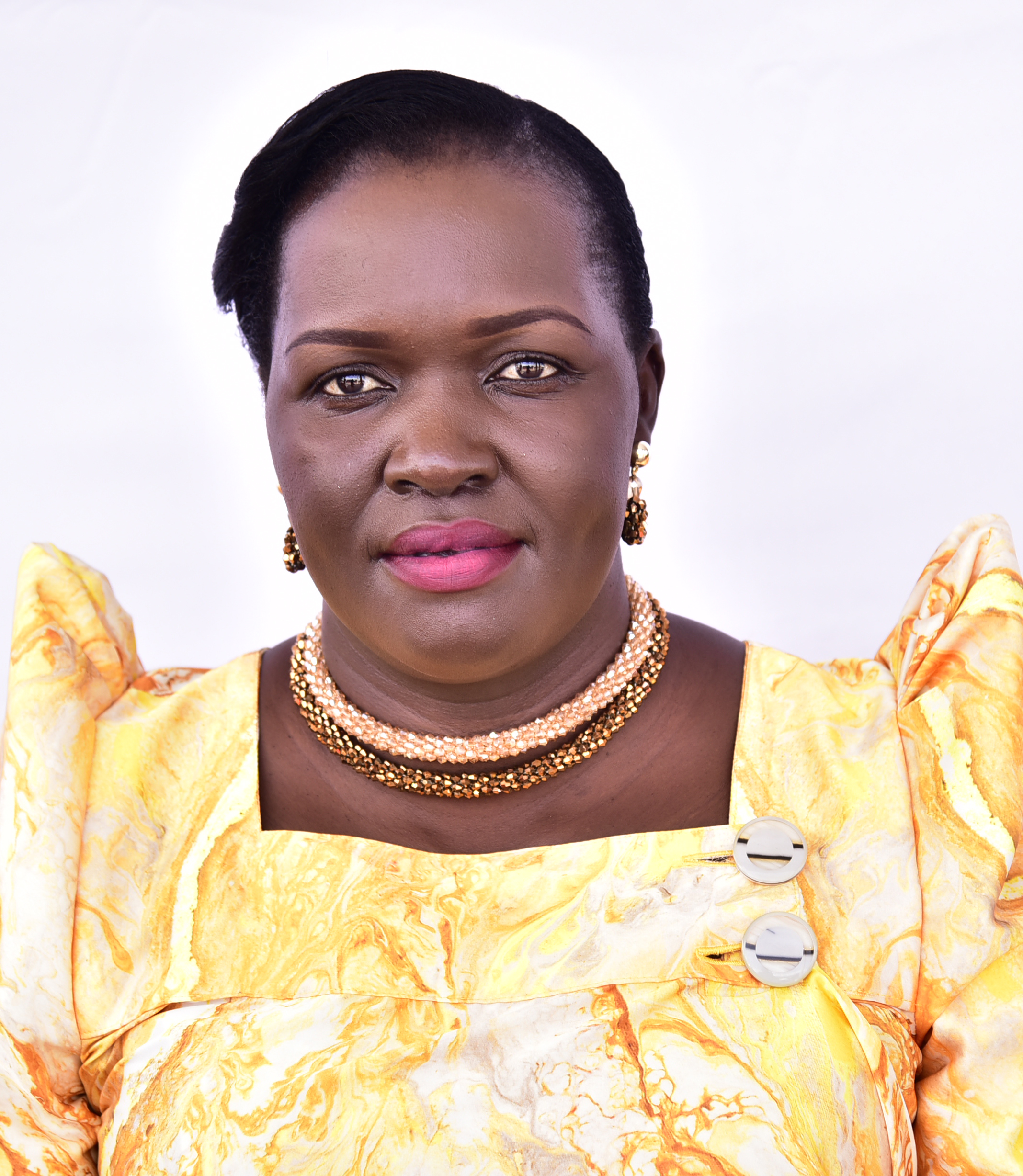
- Born: 25 December 1983 (age 42); Omoro District, Uganda
- Education: Gulu Primary School; Sacred Heart Secondary School in Gulu; Gulu University; Uganda Management Institute
- Occupation: politician
- Political party: National Resistance Movement (NRM)

Catherine Lamwaka (born 25 December 1983) is a Ugandan politician and a member of the 11th Parliament of Uganda representing Omoro District. She is a District Woman Representative for the Omoro District and a member of the National Resistance Movement (NRM) political party. The NRM party is the ruling political party in Uganda under the chairmanship of Yoweri Kaguta Museveni, the president of Uganda. She previously served as a Resident-District Commissioner for Gulu District and Pader District.

== Early life and education ==
Lamwaka was born on 25 December 1983. She started her primary education at Gulu Primary School where she completed her primary-leaving examinations. In 1996, she attended Sacred Heart Secondary School, Gulu, for her O-level and A-level education where she appeared for the Uganda Certificate of Education (UCE) examinations in 2000 and the Uganda Advanced Certificate of Education (UACE) examinations in 2002. She later joined Gulu University where, in 2006, she graduated with a bachelor's degree in development studies. In 2008, she acquired a Postgraduate Diploma in Public Administration and Management from the Uganda Management Institute.

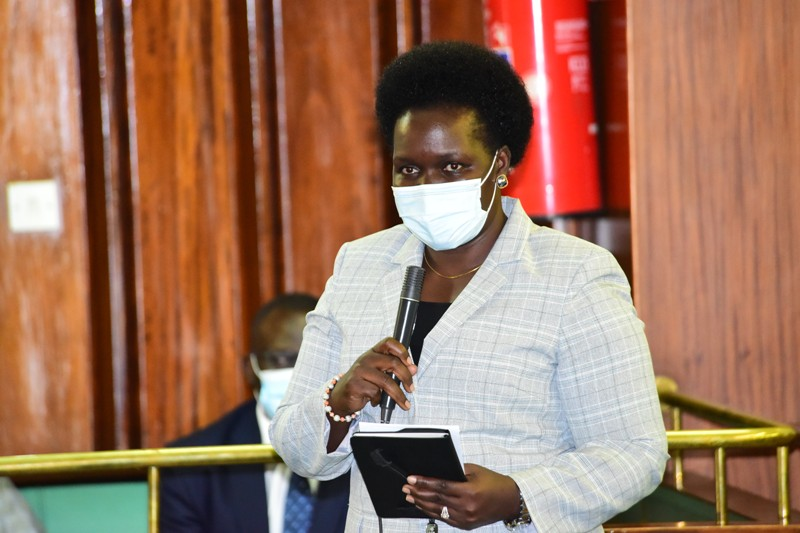
Lamwaka in 2021

== Career ==
Since 2016, Lamwaka has been a member of the Parliament of Uganda, representing the people of the Omoro District as a District Woman Representative. She serves on the Government Assurance Committee in the Parliament of Uganda and is a member of and vice chairperson for the Uganda Women Parliamentary Association (UWOPA). She served under the office of the president as Resident District Commissioner (RDC), Gulu District, from 2014 to 2015 and as Resident District Commissioner (RDC), Pader District, from 2010 to 2014. Lamwaka served as a Community Development Officer for Amuru District from 2007 to 2010, and earlier in her career as a research assistant for the Gulu NGO Forum from 2006 to 2007.
