= Gulu Women with Disabilities Union =

Nongovernmental organization in Kampala, Uganda

- Type: NGO
- Legal status: Active
- Purpose: Disability rights, women's rights, human rights
- Headquarters: Gulu, Northern Region
- Region served: Greater Northern Uganda (Gulu District, Amuru District, Omoro District, Nwoya District)
- Members: Women and girls with disabilities
- Official language: English, Acholi
- Remarks: Registered national NGO number 10435

Gulu Women with Disabilities Union (GUWODU) is a Ugandan non-governmental organisation of persons with disabilities based in Gulu District, Northern Uganda. The organisation works to promote the rights, inclusion, and empowerment of women and girls with disabilities, particularly in the Greater Northern Uganda region.

== History ==
GUWODU was established in 1998 by a group of women with disabilities under the name Makmatic, meaning "Just Focus on Work." The founders created the organisation to address discrimination, exclusion, and barriers faced by women and girls with disabilities in Northern Uganda. The organisation was first registered as a Community-Based Organisation (CBO) in Gulu District in 2002 under Registration Number CDR/418. In 2014, it obtained registration as a national non-governmental organisation with the Uganda National NGO Board under Registration Number 10435. The organization headquarters are located in Gulu District. It operates across the Greater Northern Uganda region, including the districts of Gulu, Amuru, Omoro, and Nwoya.

== See also ==
- National Union of Women with Disabilities of Uganda (NUWODU)
- Rights of persons with disabilities
- Convention on the Rights of Persons with Disabilities
- Northern Region,Uganda
- Disability rights movement
