= Paranga, Uganda =

Paranga
- Location in Uganda
- Coordinates: 02°34′32″N 32°21′25″E
- Country: Uganda
- Regions: Northern Uganda
- Sub-region: Acholi sub-region
- District: Gulu District
- Elevation: 3,540 ft (1,080 m)

Paranga is a town in Gulu District, in Northern Uganda.

== Location ==
Paranga is bordered by Barogal to the north, Ongwam to the northeast, Moru to the east, Ngai to the southeast, Bobi to the south and Ongoko to the west. This location is approximately 26 kilometres (16 mi), by road, south of Gulu, where the district headquarters are located. The coordinates of the town are:02 34 32N, 32 21 25E (Latitude:2.257556; Longitude:32.35695).

== Landmarks ==
The landmarks within the town limits or close to the edges of the town include:

- The junction of the Gulu-Masindi Highway with the Gulu-Lira Highway
- The junction of the Gulu-Masindi Highway with the Bobi-Nwoya Highway, located at Bobi, approximately 4.4 kilometres (2.7 mi), south of Paranga.
- The offices of Paranga Town Council
- Paranga Central Market

== See also ==
- Gulu
- Gulu District
- Acholi sub-region
- Acholi people
- Northern Region, Uganda
