= Obura =

Obura is a surname. Notable people with the surname include:

- David Obura, Kenyan marine ecologist
- Hellen Obura, Ugandan judge
- Patrick Ogwang Obura, Ugandan politician and accountant

== See also ==
- Obura-Wonenara District, district of Eastern Highlands Province, Papua New Guinea
