= Paranga =

Paranga may refer to:

- Paranga, Russia, an urban-type settlement in the Mari El Republic, Russia
- Paranga, Tanzania, an administrative ward in Tanzania
- Paranga, Uganda, a town in Gulu District, Uganda
- Paranga, Mykonos, a beach in Mykonos island, Greece.
