= Jajja Ichuli =

Ugandan Investigative journalists and YouTuber

- Born: 25 May 1970 (age 56); Uganda
- Died: May 6, 2023; Kampala
- Education: Standard High School; Makerere University
- Occupations: Journalist; YouTuber

Tusuubira Ibrahim Lubega (1970 – May 6, 2023), also known as Jajja Iculi or Isma Olaxess, was a Ugandan vlogger, a social media influencer and a music critic who served as president of Uganda Bloggers Association until his death in May, 2023. He came to be known for his plain-spokenness and candor communication style. His fully-televised funeral followed his public expressions of support, a day after the demise of Ugandan Minister Charles Engola, who was shot by his own bodyguard William Sabiiti, with bodyguard's action reportedly motivated by the Minister's silence over government's human rights violation.

== Career & influence ==
As a youth, Tusuubira's main job was initially house painting but he later transitioned to influence peddling and music criticism. In 2005, he migrated to Sweden's capital Stockholm, where he later began his blogging career in 2014. A year after (2015), he returned to his home country, Uganda. However, he rose to fame in 2020, when he began actively campaigning for Uganda's ruling party, the National Resistance Movement (NRM). His influence grew when he became president of the Uganda Bloggers Association. Every morning at around 7 a.m., he consistently inspired his audience with live videos on Facebook while sharing his thoughts on various topics which among others included: politics, entertainment and social lifestyles. Through his work, he expanded his reach and engagement with more celebrities.

== Personal life ==
Isma Olaxess was a Muslim of the Tabligh faction. He was approximately 5.7 feet in height. In his daily routine, he chose to keep most aspects private, for example, he had multiple wives although he rarely spoke about them publicly. One of the few personal details he shared was about his infertility when he openly announced that he was informed by doctors about his “inability to have children”. His father, Hajji Muhammad Kasajja, who came out to confirm this, was a significant figure in his life — supporting him through various challenges and achievements. The father also noted that Olaxess was a humatarian, who always prioritized other people's well-being other than his personal desires and interests.

== Net worth ==
Tusuubira's financial journey was dynamic. He was estimated to have a net worth of about 113 million Uganda shillings. During his tenure as Chairperson of the Uganda Bloggers Association, a position that he held from August 8, 2021, he earned a monthly payment of 7 million Uganda shillings (approximately US$2,000). Many people believed this role, that he won with 83% of the total votes, would amplify his voice and reach within the community of bloggers and content creators from the East African country, and his expertise would enable him help them recover some suspended platforms. He proclaimed himself holder of this position through a self-administered oath, later disclosing his motivation to sustain the devotion of his fan base.

== Controversies ==
Ichuli faced numerous contentious issues throughout his career. On October 4, 2017, when a Ugandan producer Danz Ku Mapeesa was succumbed to head injuries that led to his death, Isma was linked to this event hence some influential figures came out to request for his arrest — following his comments. In the aftermath, he also came out and clarified never to have confessed to Danz's death.

In 2020, while campaigning for NRM, a ruling party led by one of the world's longest serving presidents, Yoweri Museveni, Isma's passport was revoked when the opposition wrote to Swedish embassy for his support to some acts of oppression. Despite these challenges, he remained consistent in expressing his views and continuing his work.

Isma Olaxess on November 21, 2021, like many outspoken individuals, was remanded at the Criminal Investigation Department (CID) headquarters in Kibuli, Kampala, along with three journalists for using offensive language and inciting violence. However, on November 25, 2021, just after four days, he was charged and finally granted bail.

On March 23, 2022, Spamania, a wellness center in Uganda, terminated its ambassadorial contract with Jajja Iculi. This decision was precipitated by his public statements, made during a Facebook Live video, endorsing a school's exclusion of Solomon Kampala, son of opposition leader Bobi Wine, from school leadership opportunities. The exclusion was reportedly motivated by government influence.

== Death ==
Wearing a Lakers jersey, Tusuubira's life was cut short at 9:20 p.m.; Saturday, May 6, 2023, when he was shot dead while nearing his home's gateway in Kyanja, a suburb in Kampala. The unmasked killer, who used a motorbike to vacate soon after the incident, waited for 2 hours to ensure the act was completed — firing eight bullets into his upper body and head. These found him on a passenger seat in his Toyota HiAce drone, UBK 213D, that was earlier gifted to him by a Ugandan businessman, Hamis Kiggundu.

According to a BBC News reporter, his discussions on diverse sensitive topics made it hard to trace who exactly the killers would be. But later, the killer gun was revealed to be an SMG pistol, according to Police investigations. His driver, Mathias Wasswa, was left unharmed and the news of his death were initially announced by his social media administrator through his official Facebook Page. Tusuubira was buried on May 7, 2023, in Nkokonjeru, Buikwe.

== Reactions & legacy ==
The reactions to Tusuubira's death were profound and widespread. Uganda's President Yoweri Museveni, extended the condolences to his family and publicly condemned the brutal killing, highlighting the significance of loss to the nation. Opposition leader Bobi Wine also weighed in, reflecting on his death as a reminder of the importance of financial security and stability. The Speaker of Uganda's Parliament, Anita Among, emphasized too the need for accountability and justice in this case when Police was called upon to prosecute those responsible for death of Olaxess.

While authorities did apprehend three suspects, including the driver, a conclusive report on the circumstances surrounding Isma's demise remains pending as of October, 2024. And while Isma's legacy continues to inspire many bloggers and content creators who look up to his journey and achievements, some of them were weakened mostly those who considered Olaxess as their key source of information.
