= Kamdini =

Kamdini Kamdini Corner
- Location in Uganda
- Coordinates: 02°14′47″N 32°19′52″E
- Country: Uganda
- Region: Northern Uganda
- Sub-region: Lango sub-region
- District: Oyam District
- Elevation: 3,468 ft (1,057 m)

Population (2012 Estimate)
  - Total: 5,000

Kamdini, also referred to as Kamdini Corder, is a town in the Northern Region of Uganda.

== Location ==
Kamdini is in the Oyam District of the Lango sub-region. The town is approximately 21.5 kilometres (13.4 mi), by road, west of Oyam, where the district headquarters are located. This is approximately 68 kilometres (42 mi), by road, west of Lira, the nearest large city. The coordinates of the town are 2°14'47.0"N, 32°19'52.0"E (Latitude:2.246402; Longitude: 32.331120).

== Overview ==
Kamdini lies at the junction of three major roads in Uganda. The Kiryandongo-Kamdini Road, the Gulu–Kamdini Road, and the Lira-Kamdini Road, with all meeting in the center of town. The average elevation of the town is approximately 1,057 metres (3,468 ft) above sea level.

== See also ==
- Langi people
- Murchison Falls National Park
- List of cities and towns in Uganda
- List of roads in Uganda
