= Committee on Climate Change (Uganda) =

Standing committee of the Parliament of Uganda

Standing committee overview
- Formed: 2021
- Preceding Standing committee: Committee on Natural Resources
- Jurisdiction: Parliament of Uganda
- Headquarters: Parliament Building, Kampala, Uganda
- Employees: 39 members
- Annual budget: Oversight only
- Standing committee executives: Biyika Lawrence Songa, Chairperson; Atuto Jacinta, Deputy Chairperson
- Parent department: Parliament of Uganda
- Key document: Climate Change Act, 2021
- Website: https://www.parliament.go.ug

Footnotes
- Political Composition: NRM (26) NUP (5) Independents (4) FDC (2) DP (1) UPC (1)

The Committee on Climate Change is a standing committee of the Parliament of Uganda which is responsible scrutinizing Uganda's climate policies, reviewing the environment laws, and following up on Uganda's international commitments under accords like the Paris Agreement.

The committee operates in collaboration with the Ministry of Water and Environment, the Department of Climate Change, and development partners to enhance Uganda's climate resilience and low-carbon development.

== Mandate ==
Under the Parliament's Rules of Procedure, the committee has the mandate to examine all climate-related legislation, policy proposals, and government programmes with the responsibility of reviewing environmental regulations, assessing national and international climate financing proposals, monitoring implementation of climate initiatives, and ensuring alignment with the National Climate Change Bill, 2020 which was passed on 14th August 2020 and the Climate Change Act, 2021.

The committee also advises Parliament on climate change related priorities in Uganda and provides oversight over government performance on nationally determined contributions (NDCs) and other international commitments under the United Nations Framework Convention on Climate Change (UNFCCC).

== Status within Parliament ==
The Committee on Climate Change is one of the standing committees in Parliament of Uganda reconstituted every two and a half years and typically comprise 30 to 35 members just like other standing committees. Membership is drawn from various political parties with in the Parliament of Uganda with regional considerations through nominations coordinated by party whips.

== History ==
The Committee was formulated in 2021 following the passage of the Climate Change Act. Before its formulation, all climate-related oversight was handled by the Natural Resources Committee and Parliament Forum on Climate Change which was founded in 2008. Its formulation came up as response to growing international obligations and national climate priorities outlined in Uganda's Vision 2040 and the National Development Plan III.

== Leadership ==
The leadership of the committee includes a Chairperson, a Deputy Chairperson, and a Clerk assigned by the Parliamentary Commission.

As of 2024, the Chairperson is Lawrence Biyika Songa, Member of Parliament for Ora County, Deputed by Jacinta Atuto, Member of Parliament for Kabula County .

NRM (26) NUP (5) FDC (2) DP (1) UPC (1) Independents (4) = 39 members

Party-wise membership of Committee on Climate Change (2024–2026)
1. NRM (66.7%)
2. NUP (12.8%)
3. Independents (10.3%)
4. FDC (5.13%)
5. DP (2.56%)
6. UPC (2.56%)

Membership of the Committee on Climate Change (January 2024 – May 2026)
Photo	Name	Constituency	Party
	Biyika Lawrence Songa	Ora County	NRM
	Atuto Jacinta	DWR, Kapelebyong	NRM
	Asiimwe Enos	Kabula County	NRM
	Kabahenda Flavia	DWR, Kyegegwa	NRM
	Esenu Anthony Alden	Kapelebyong County	NRM
	Mamawi James	Adjumani County East	NRM
	Achan Judith Peace	DWR, Nwoya	NRM
	Kamukama Benjamin	Ruhaama County East	NRM
	Nakwang Christine Tubo	DWR, Kaabong	NRM
	Igeme Nathan Nabeta	Jinja South East Division	NRM
	Kesande Grace Bataringaya	DWR, Rubirizi	NRM
	Ngoya John Bosco	Bokora County	NRM
	Awor Betty Engola	DWR, Apac	NRM
	Kinshaba Patience Nkunda	DWR, Kanungu	NRM
	Maneno Zumura	DWR, Obongi	NRM
	Magolo John Faith	Bungokho County North	NRM
	Asiimwe Molly Musiime	DWR, Wampala	NRM
	Okia Joannie Aniku	DWR, Madi-Okollo	NRM
	Auma Hellen Wandera	DWR, Busia	NRM
	Akampulira Prossy Mbabazi	DWR, Rubanda	NRM
	Bigirwa Norah Nyendwoha	DWR, Buliisa	NRM
	Buturo James Nsaba	Bufumbira County East	NRM
	Muheesi Jennifer Abaho	DWR, Kazo	NRM
	Natumanya Flora	DWR, Kikuube	NRM
	Oseku Richard Oriebo	Kibale County	NRM
	Kaaya Christine Nakimwero	DWR, Kiboga	NUP
	Matovu Charles	Busiro County South	NUP
	Lwanga Jimmy	Njeru Municipality	NUP
	Balimwezo Ronald Nsubuga	Nakawa Division East	NUP
	Nakimuli Hellen	DWR, Kalangala	NUP
	Kamara Nicholas	Kabale Municipality	FDC
	Nyakato Asinansi	CWR, Hoima City	FDC
	Lumu Richard Kizito	Mityana County South	DP
	Alum Santa Ogwang	DWR, Oyam	UPC
	Atukwasa Rita	CWR, Mbarara City	Independents
	Kiiza Kenneth	Bujenje County	Independents
	Kamuntu Moses	Rubanda County West	Independents
	Nantaba Idah Erios	DWR, Kayunga	Independents
	Musherure Shartsi Kutesa	Mawogola County North	Independents

== Role in climate governance ==
The committee plays a key role in Uganda's national climate governance by:

- Reviewing the national climate change strategy and budget allocations
- Overseeing institutional coordination mechanisms, including the National Climate Change Advisory Committee
- Evaluating climate adaptation and mitigation actions across key sectors such as energy, agriculture, transport, and water
- Supporting mainstreaming of climate considerations in government planning and reporting processes

== Activities ==
The committee regularly holds hearings with ministries and departments implementing climate-related programmes. It has reviewed budget lines from the Ministry of Water and Environment, and assessed performance of projects funded by international climate funds. In 2023, it contributed to consultations on the revised Nationally Determined Contributions and supported Uganda's position at COP28.

It also works with the Parliamentary Forum on Climate Change – Uganda (PFCC-U) to organise awareness campaigns, site visits, and community dialogues on climate impacts.

== See also ==
- Parliament of Uganda
- Ministry of Water and Environment (Uganda)
- Climate change in Uganda
- Nationally Determined Contributions
- UNFCCC
- Paris Agreement
- United Nations Framework Convention on Climate Change
