= Kayogera Yona =

Ugandan teacher and politician

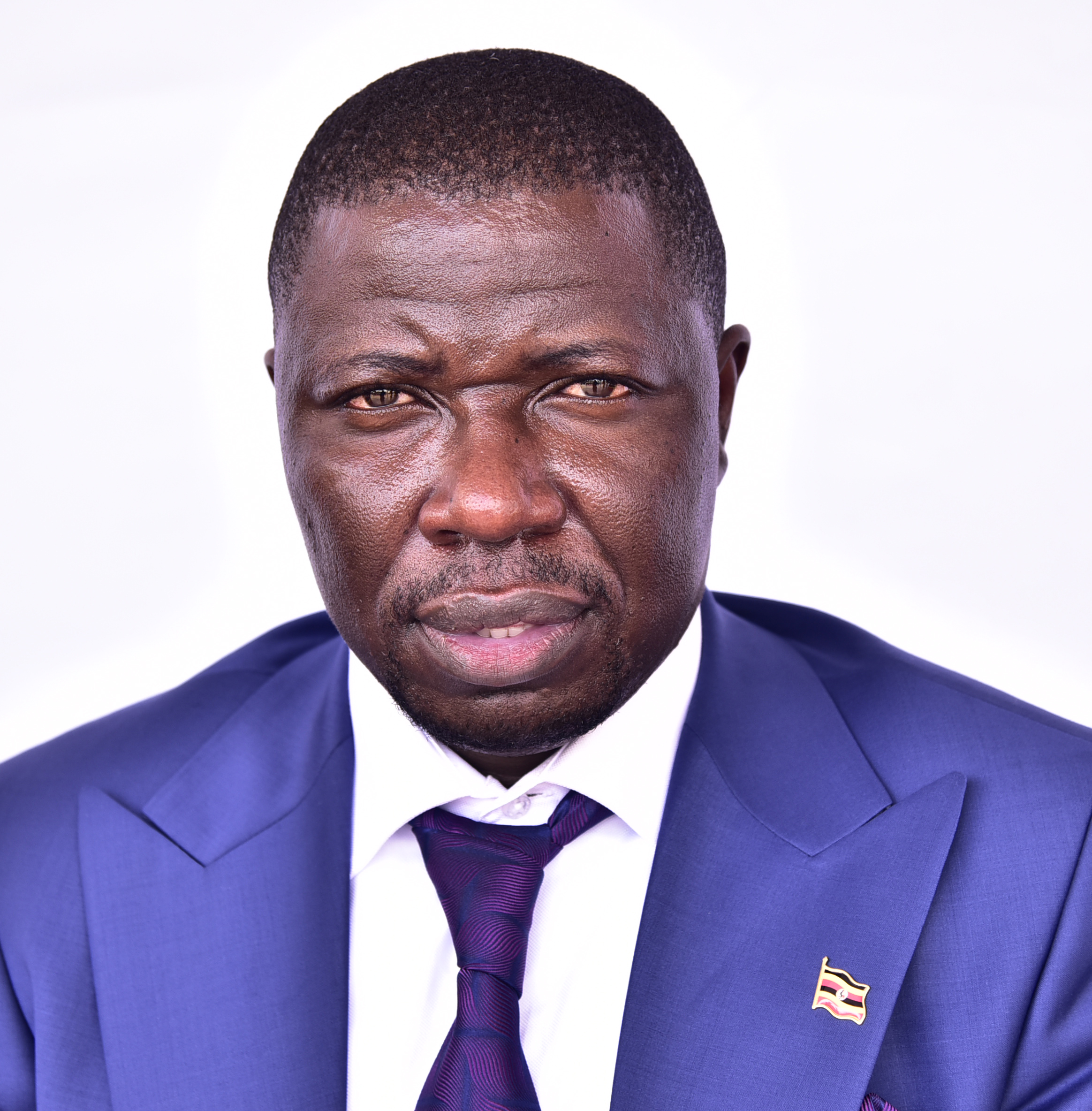

Member of Parliament for Busiki North County
- In office 2021–2026
- Preceded by: Akamba Paul (2016-2021)

Personal details
- Born: April 14, 1984 (age 42) Uganda
- Party: National Resistance Movement
- Education: Grade III teaching certificate
- Occupation: Politician
- Committees: Committee on Foreign Affairs; Committee on Human Rights; Committee on Equal Opportunities

Kayogera Yona (born 14 April 1984) is a Ugandan teacher and politician who is the Member of Parliament for Busiki North County, Namutumba District in the 11th Parliament of Uganda (2021–2026). He is affiliated with the National Resistance Movement (NRM), Uganda's ruling political party.

In Parliament, he is a member of Committee on Foreign Affairs, the Committee on Human Rights and Committee on Equal Opportunities.

== Education ==
Yona holds a Grade III teaching certificate.

== Political career ==
Kayogera Yona was elected to the Parliament of Uganda representing Busiki North County in 2021 where he won with 5,069 votes succeeding Asupasa Isiko Wilson Mpongo who was the Member of Parliament for the same county in the 10th Parliament of Uganda (2011–2016). He serves on multiple parliamentary committees, including the Committee on Foreign Affairs, the Committee on Equal Opportunities, and the Committee on Human Rights.

In the National Resistance Movement (NRM) primaries for the 2025 elections, Yona lost the party nomination for Busiki North to Isiko Mpongo.

== See also ==
- Namutumba District
- Parliament of Uganda
- National Resistance Movement
- List of members of the eleventh Parliament of Uganda
