= Charles Engola =

Ugandan politician and retired military officer (1958–2023)

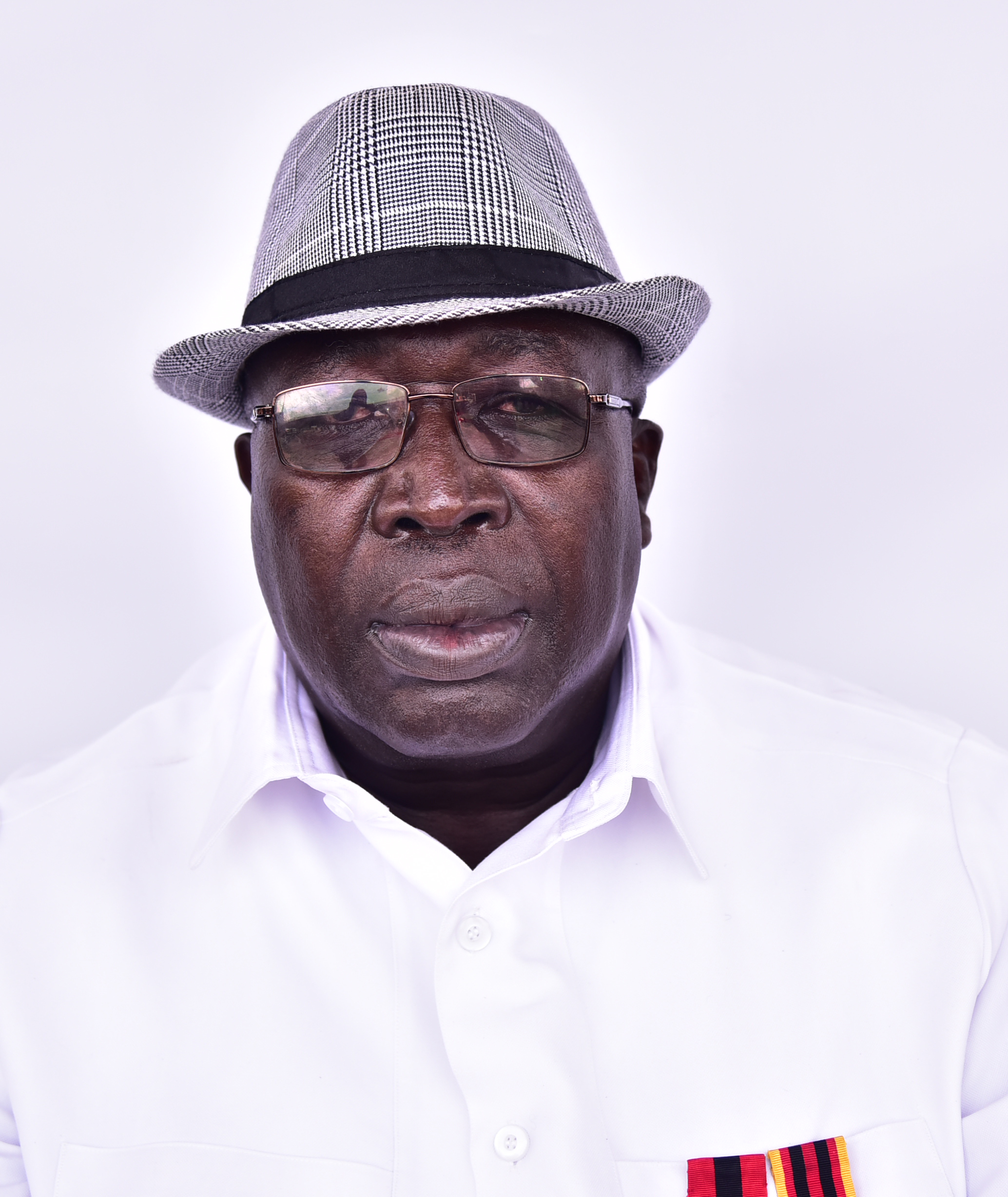
- Born: 12 October 1958; Iceme, Oyam District, Protectorate of Uganda
- Died: 2 May 2023 (aged 64); Kampala, Uganda
- Cause of death: Gunshot wounds
- Education: Kampala International University (Bachelor of Development Studies, Master of Public Administration and Management)
- Occupations: Politician; retired military officer
- Years active: 1982–2023
- Known for: Military matters
- Title: Member of Parliament for Oyam County North and State Minister for Defence

Charles Okello Macodwogo Engola (12 October 1958 – 2 May 2023), commonly known as Charles Okello (Macodwogo) Engola, was a Ugandan politician and a retired colonel in the Uganda People's Defence Force. He was the State Minister for Labour, Employment and Industrial Relations in the Ugandan Cabinet, as well as the Member of Parliament representing Oyam North County when he was shot and killed by his bodyguard. Previously, he had held the position of Minister of State for Defence.

== Early life and education ==
Engola was born on 12 October 1958 in present-day Iceme, Oyam District. His parents were Chief (Jago) Nasan Engola, a well-known and respected chief in Lango, and Ketula Engola of Awangi, and he was the grandson of Rwot Olong Adilo and great-grandson of Rwot Olwa Abelli of Iceme. He attended a local primary school in Iceme. According to his profile at the website of Uganda's parliament, he obtained his high school certificate from Soroti Secondary School, in the city of Soroti, in the Eastern Region of Uganda. His first degree, a Bachelor of Development Studies, was awarded by Kampala International University, in 2010. His second degree, a Master of Public Administration and Management was obtained from the same university in 2013.

== Career ==
In the military, Engola was the commander of UPDF 501 Brigade, headquartered at Opit, in Gulu District. The brigade played a role in fighting the Lord's Resistance Army. He was promoted to the rank of colonel and retired from the military in 2007.

During the 2006 national election cycle, Engola successfully contested the Local Council 5, Oyam District Council Chairmanship, on the ruling National Resistance Movement political party ticket. He won in a landslide, winning 93 percent of the vote. He was re-elected in 2011 and served as the local council Chair for Oyam District for 10 years, from 2006. In 2016, he won the Oyam North parliamentary seat.

On 6 June 2016, Engola was named to the cabinet as State Minister of Defence. In the cabinet reshuffle of 14 December 2019, Engola retained his portfolio.

At the time of his death, he was serving as the State Minister for Labour, Employment and Industrial Relations and led the Republic of Uganda government officials on 1 May 2023 in commemoration of the International Labour Day in Mayuge District in Eastern Uganda.

== Death ==
Charles Engola was shot at his home on 2 May 2023. He was 64. A soldier who was guarding Engola shot him and then shot himself dead. The soldier who shot Engola was identified as Private Wilson Sabiiti, and the local press reported that the incident arose from an apparent dispute over the guard's wages. Gender and Labour minister, Betty Amongi, who rushed to the scene soon after the shooting, said that Pte. Sabiiti was a new bodyguard and had been on the job for only a month. According to eyewitnesses of the shooting, Sabiiti had complained that he had not been paid some USh4,000,000, a bit more than US$1000, that was owed him. Engola's aide-de-camp, Lieutenant Ronald Otim, also sustained injuries in the shooting and was rushed to hospital; two days later, he was said to be out of danger "and getting stable" after doctors at Mulago National Referral Hospital had stopped the bleeding.

== See also ==
- Cabinet of Uganda
- Parliament of Uganda
- Military officers
