= Minakulu =

Coordinates: 2°26′N 32°23′E

Minakulu is one of the sub-counties forming Oyam District in Northern Uganda. It is located west of Oyam town and south of Gulu town, about 20 kilometres from Oyam district headquarters and 32 kilometres from Gulu district headquarters.

The name originates from min, meaning "mother," and kulu, meaning "well, river, or source of water." It is derived from a small tributary of the Nile which local tales say had devastating effects on people's lives and property, due to huge floods during rainy seasons destroying crops, and killing people and animals. The havoc that this tributary caused to the people of the area made them perceive it as the mother of all rivers, and gave their locality the name Minakulu, or "mother of all rivers."

== History ==
During colonist times, Minakulu was on its way to becoming a business centre as several businesses were established by Indian men doing retail trade. However, the colonial government in the 1930s passed an ordinance barring foreigners from carrying out retail trade in fear of complete alienation of the indigenous population and thereby causing a possible uprising. Being far from the colonial administrative centre, the Indians continued the trade only to "run away" following the famous Amin's dream and decree sending away Indians for "milking the cow without feeding."

== People ==
Minakulu is a Lango-inhabited sub-county. However, its location at the border of the Acholi districts of Gulu and Amuru means several acholis are resident in the sub-county. This has never caused any rift, as the relationship between the two sub-ethnic groups has historically been smooth, with both tribes claiming to have originated from Bar-el-Gazel in southern Sudan as the "Luo." Historians doubt this assertion though. It is thought that the Langi belong to the Ateker group of other tribes, like the Kumam, Iteso and Karamajong people who may have migrated from Ethiopia.

During the LRA insurgency in northern Uganda, Minakulu suffered from several raids by the rebels who looked at the sub-county as its food basket. G-nuts, beans, simsim and peas, which are produced in abundance by the people of the sub-county, were the main targets of the rebels from the 1980s until the Northern Peace talks halted the war in 2007.

== Education ==
Minakulu hosts several educational institutions including Minakulu Technical School, Dr. Oryang secondary school, Equatorial College - Minakulu, Amwa comprehensive secondary school, 15 primary schools, and a couple of nursery schools. The people of the sub-county are fairly educated compared to the rest of the sub-counties in the district.

== Economy ==
Minakulu is mainly an agricultural based sub-county. It produces cotton, g-nuts, simsim, cassava, beans, pigeon peas, oranges, mangoes and pineapples. These crops were stored and traded using a government-aided subsidiary, the Lango Cooperative Union, created by the Obote government in the 1960s. However, the world bank liberalisation policy implemented in the 1990s by the new regime of president Yoweri Museveni led to the collapse of this organised commerce. Since then, the people of Minakulu are less commercial in the traditional sense. Rather, there is total concentration on food crops which are mainly for home use with negligible surplus sold to local businessmen for onward transportation and sale to Kampala, Uganda's capital city, where some basic profit is made.

A map showing the location of Minakulu can be found here:
