= Nandagire Christine Ndiwalana =

Ugandan politician

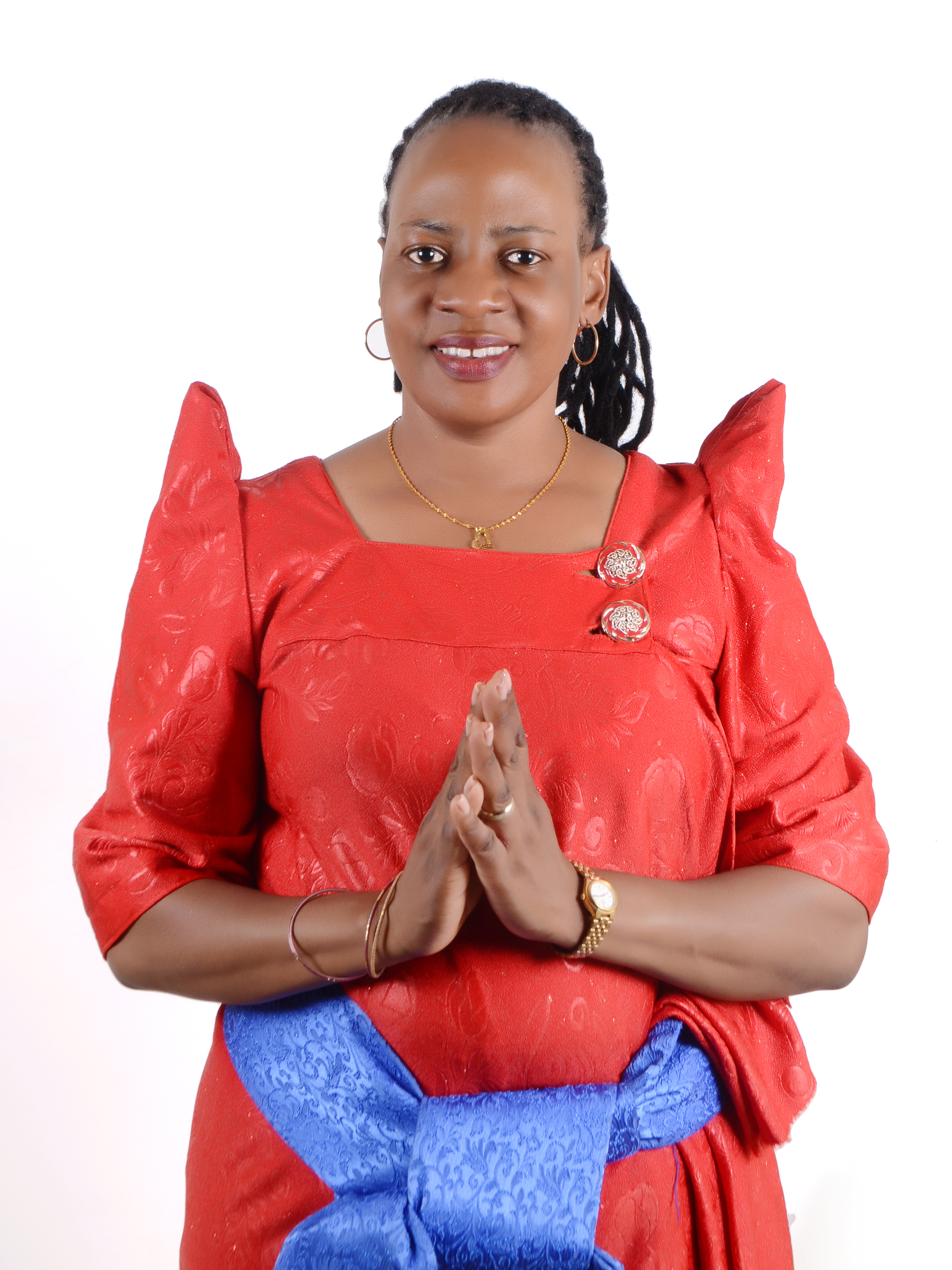

Member of Parliament
- Incumbent
- Assumed office 2021
- Constituency: Bukomansimbi North, Bukomansimbi District

Personal details
- Born: Uganda
- Party: National Unity Platform (NUP)
- Other political affiliations: Democratic Party (formerly)
- Education: Makerere University (MBChB)
- Occupation: Politician

Nandagire Christine Ndiwalana is a Ugandan politician. She was elected to Parliament in the 2021 general election as a National Unity Platform MP representing Bukomansimbi North Bukomansimbi District in the 11th parliament of Uganda.

In the 11th parliament (2021–2026), she serves on the parliamentary committee on health and the parliamentary committee on equal opportunities.

In the 12th parliament (2026-2031), she represents Bukomansibi North under the National Unity Platform (NUP) party.

== Early life and education ==
Nandagire Christine Ndiwalana holds a bachelor's degree in medicine and surgery from Makerere University. Previously known as Christine Nandagire, she changed her name to Nandagire Christine Ndiwalana by deed poll in 2018.

In August 2019 she was announced as the Democratic Party candidate to contest Bukomansimbi North in Bukomansimbi District. She subsequently moved to the National Unity Platform. After internal disputes split the National Resistance Movement in the area, she defeated the incumbent MP Ruth Katushabe to be elected to Parliament for 2021-26.
