= Flavia Rwabuhoro Kabahenda =

Ugandan politician

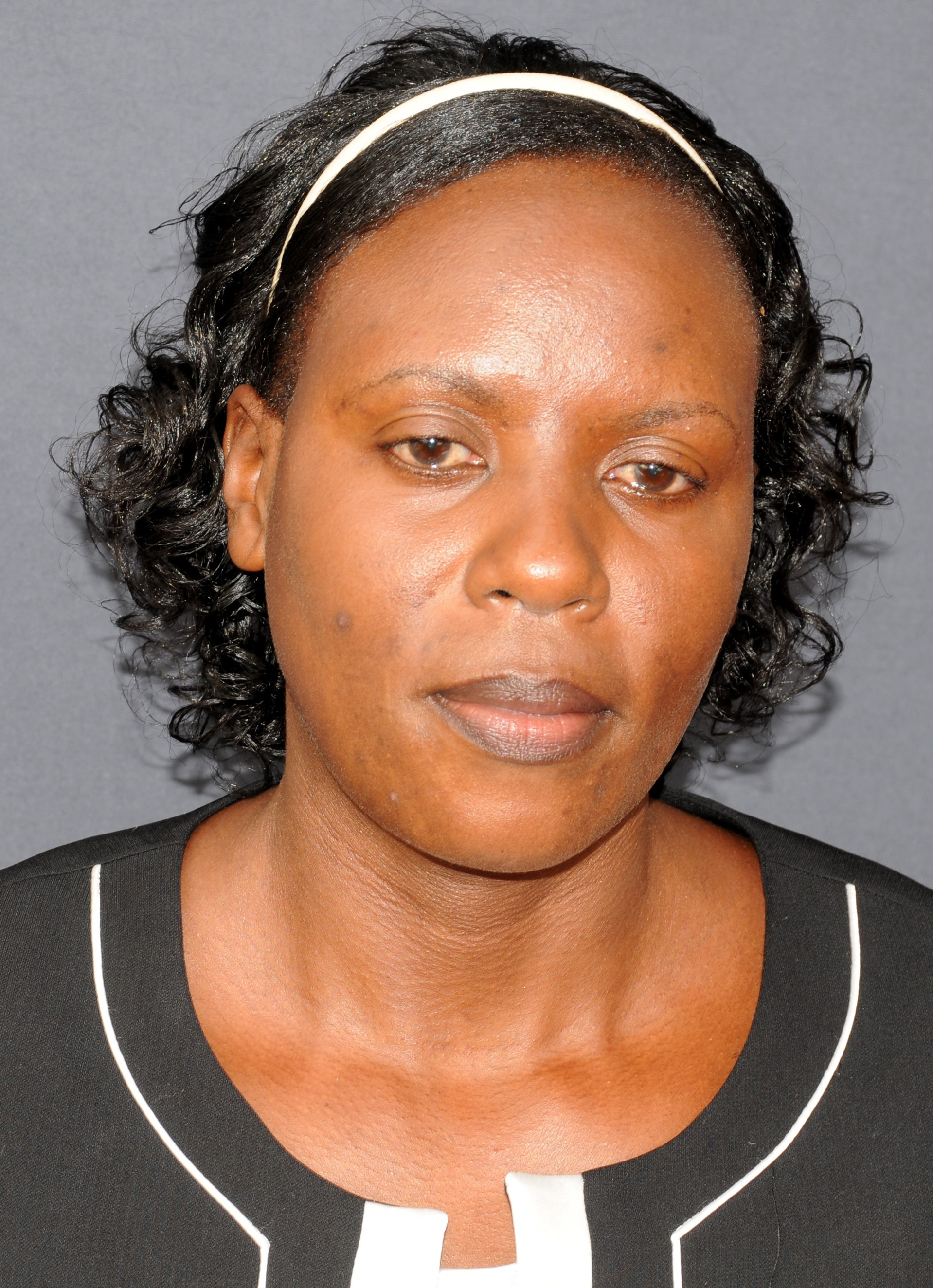
- Born: 20th June, 1965; Kyegegwa District
- Education: Makerere University Business School; Kyambogo University; Mountains of the Moon University
- Occupation: Politician
- Political party: National Resistance Movement

Flavia Rwabuhoro Kabahenda is a Ugandan Politician, Woman member of Parliament representing Kyegegwa district in the 11th Parliament of Uganda representing the National Resistance Movement. She is also Chairperson Parliament committee of gender labor and social development. She also served in the 10th Parliament of Uganda as the woman Member of Parliament representing Kyengewa District. Flavia was the founding chairperson and coordinator of the Uganda Parliamentary Forum on Social Protection established in 2014. Flavia Rwabuhoro Kabahenda was also a key advocate for the Senior Citizens’ Grant in Uganda.

== Background and education ==
Born on 20 June 1965, Flavia Rwabuhoro Kabahenda has a diploma in business studies from Makerere University Business School and a diploma in education (secondary) from Kyambogo University. She also has a bachelor's degree in business management from the Mountains of the Moon University in Fort Portal.

== Political career ==
Flavia Rwabuhoro Kabahenda was the pioneer woman councillor representing Kyegegwa sub-county in Kyenjojo, then a new district, from 2002 to 2006. Between 1995 and 2001, she was secretary for women representing Kyaka county on the Kabarole district council. She has served as the Woman Member of Parliament for Kyegegwa in the 9th Parliament, the 10th Parliament and is currently serving in the 11th Parliament of the Republic of Uganda.

== See also ==
- List of members of the eleventh Parliament of Uganda
- List of members of the tenth Parliament of Uganda
- List of Members of the ninth Parliament of Uganda
- National Resistance Movement
