= Omoro District =

- District
- Interactive map of Omoro District
- Coordinates: 02°35′N 32°22′E
- Country: Uganda
- Region: Northern Uganda
- Sub-region: Acholi sub-region
- Capital: Palenga

Government
  - District Chairman (LCV): Douglas Peter Okello
- Time zone: UTC+3 (EAT)
- Website: www.omoro.go.ug

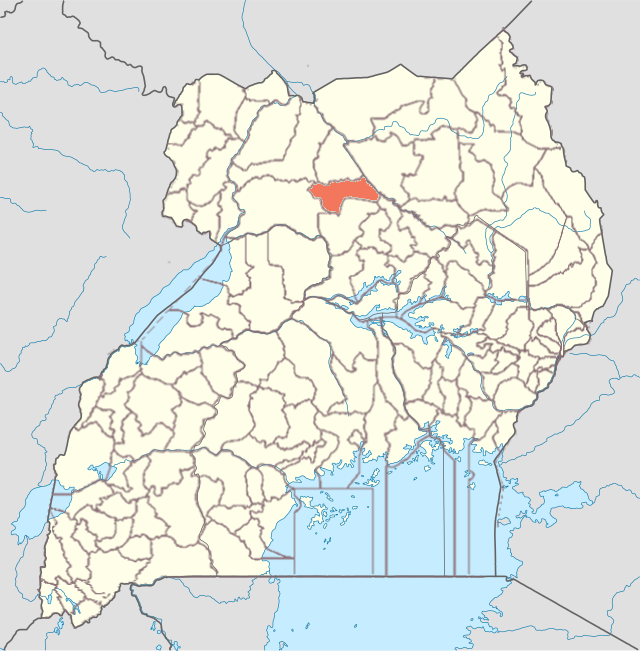

Omoro District is a district in the Northern Region of Uganda.

== Location ==
Omoro District is bordered by Gulu District to the north, Pader District to the east, Oyam District to the south and Nwoya District to the west. The town of Palenga, where the district headquarters are located is about 24 kilometres (15 mi), by road, south of Gulu, the largest city in the Acholi sub-region. This is approximately 311 kilometres (193 mi), by road, north of Kampala, the largest city and capital of Uganda.

== Overview ==
Omoro District was created by the Parliament of Uganda on 3 September 2015, and became operational on 1 July 2016. Prior to its creation, Omoro was "Omoro County" in neighboring Gulu District. The rationale for its creation was to "bring services closer to the people" and to improve "service delivery" to the constituents.

== Points of interest ==
The main road from Kampala to Gulu (Kampala-Gulu Road), passes through the district in a general south to north direction.

== Notable people ==
The former speaker of parliament in Uganda, Jacob Oulanyah, now deceased, concurrently served as the elected representative of Omoro District in parliament, starting back when Omoro was a county in Gulu District.
