= Geoffrey Mutiwa =

Ugandan politician

Honourable Geoffrey Mutiwa

Member of the Parliament of Uganda
- Incumbent
- Assumed office 24 May 2021
- Preceded by: James Waluswaka
- Constituency: Bunyole West, Butaleja District

Personal details
- Party: National Resistance Movement

Geoffrey Mutiwa commonly known as Mutiwa Geofrey Eric (born 12 April 1982) is a Ugandan journalist and a politician who serves as the Member of Parliament for Bunyole West County, in Butaleja District, Uganda.

== Career ==
Before he was elected as Member of Parliament (MP) for Bunyole West County in Butaleja District on the ticket of the National Resistance Movement (NRM) in the 2021 general election, Mutiwa was a journalist and radio host of a local radio station, Tororo FM. Mutiwa is an advocate for awareness of Malaria in Uganda. He is the treasurer for the Uganda Parliamentary Forum on Malaria.

Mutiwa serves on the committee on Information, Communication Technology and National Guidance.

Mutiwa lost the Bunyole West County seat in the 2026 general election to former MP James Waluswaka.

== See Also ==
- Abdu Katuntu
- Thomas Tayebwa
- Anita Among
- Nobert Mao
