= Dorcus Acen =

Ugandan politician

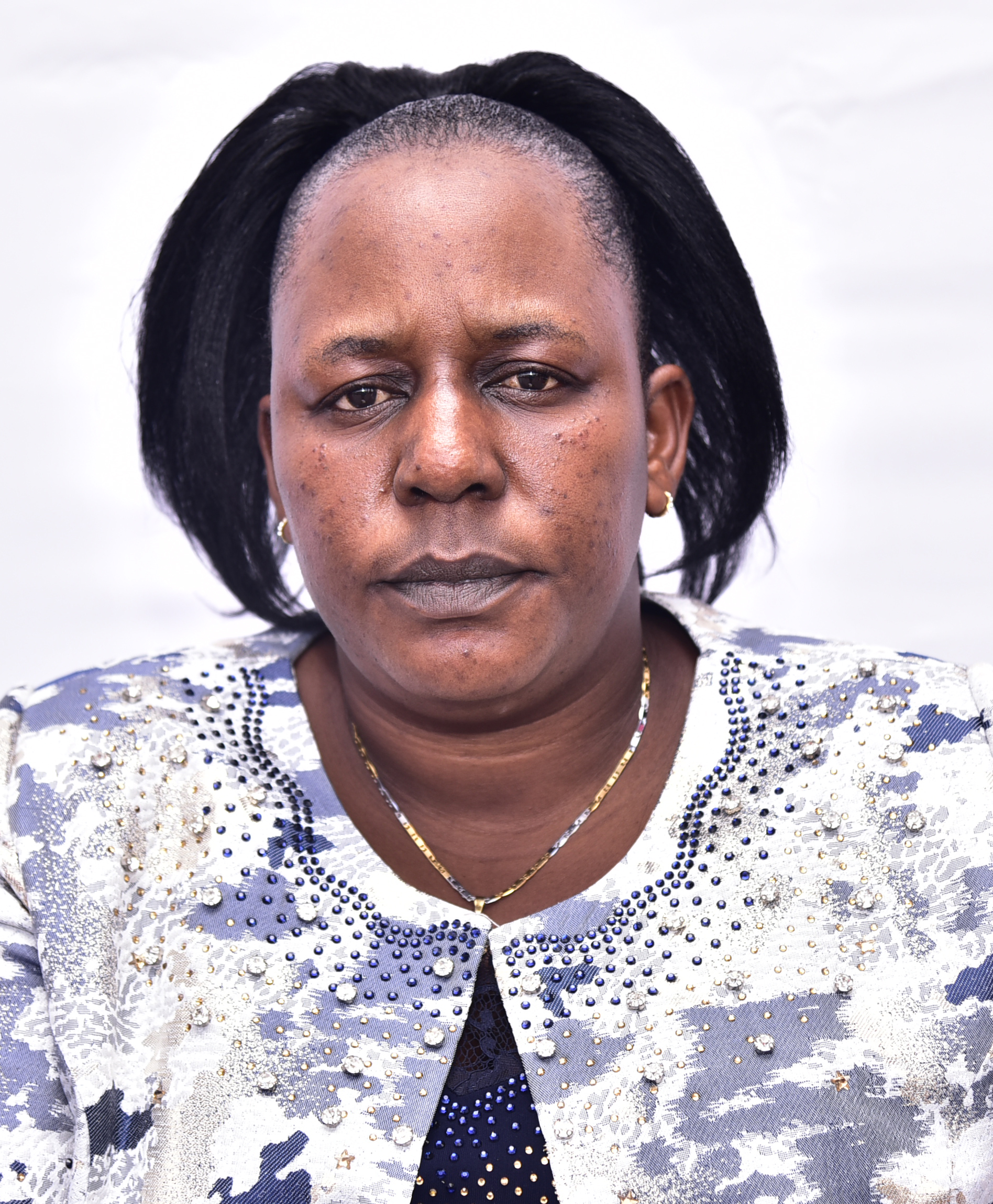

Personal details
- Born: Dorcus Acen
- Party: National Resistance Movement
- Other political affiliations: independent
- Occupation: politician
- Known for: Women's Representative in the eleventh Parliament of Uganda

Dorcus Acen, also known as Dorcas Acen, is a Ugandan politician and Alebtong District Women's Representative in the eleventh Parliament of Uganda. She stood as the Alebtong District Women's Representative in the tenth Parliament of Uganda as an independent politician.

In the 2021 election, Dorcus Acen was affiliated with the National Resistance Movement as the ruling political party. During her campaigning period, she donated two ambulances to her home district to help with managing referral cases in the district and boost its rapid response to the COVID-19 pandemic. She also donated posho and beans to vulnerable people in the district whose livelihood had been affected by the extended lockdown and other presidential measures, aimed at managing the COVID-19 outbreak countrywide. In the 2021, Ugandan general election, Acen was elected as the woman representative for Alebtong District. In the eleventh parliament, she serves on the Committee on Gender, Labour and Social Development.

== Career ==
She worked at GBV Prevention Network as the focal person for sexual violence and violence against women in emergencies. In 2018, she worked as the Gender and Protection Adviser at CARE International in South Sudan, where she is responsible for the overall direction of the Gender and Protection programme portfolio.

== See also ==
- List of members of the eleventh Parliament of Uganda
- National Resistance Movement
- Parliament of Uganda
- Alebtong District
- Member of Parliament
- Independent politician
