= Moses Ogwal =

Ugandan politician

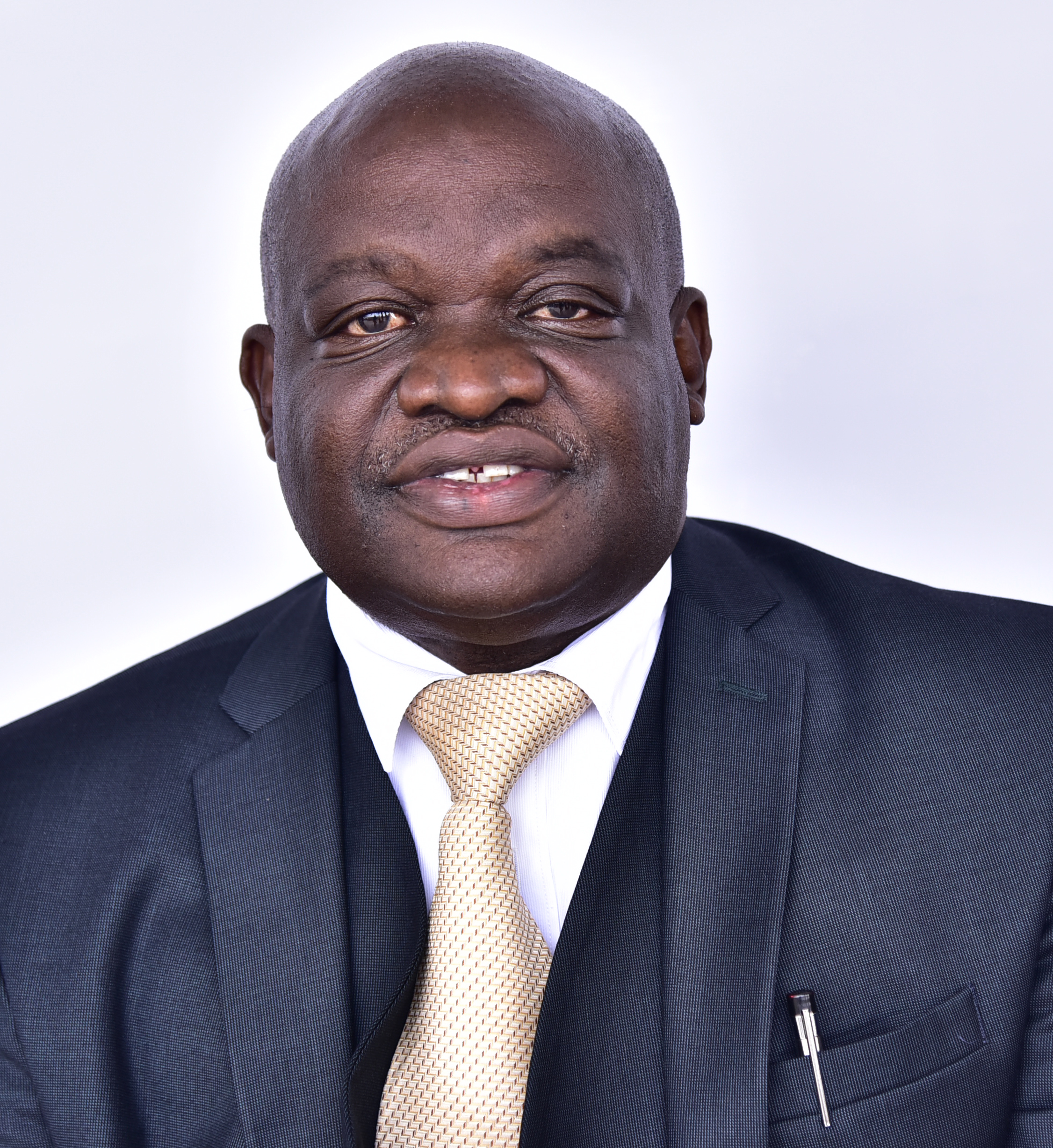

Member of the Parliament of Uganda from Dokolo North Constituency
- Incumbent
- Assumed office 2021

Personal details
- Party: National Resistance Movement (NRM)

Moses Goli Ogwal is a Ugandan politician and a member of the Ugandan parliament from Dokolo North Constituency. He is a member of National Resistance movement (NRM). He served as the Director of Private Sector Development.

In the eleventh parliament, he serves on the Committee on East African Community Affairs.
