= Bobi, Uganda =

Bobi
- Location in Uganda
- Coordinates: 02°33′16″N 32°21′28″E
- Country: Uganda
- Region: Northern Uganda
- Sub-region: Acholi sub-region
- District: Gulu District
- Elevation: 3,000 ft (900 m)

Bobi is a town in the Northern Region of Uganda.

== Location ==
Bobi is in Gulu District along the Kamdini–Gulu Road, approximately 27 kilometres (17 mi), by road, south of Gulu, the largest city in the Northern Region. The coordinates of the town are 2°33'16.0"N, 32°21'28.0"E (Latitude:2.554441; Longitude:32.357782).

== Points of interest ==
The following points of interest lie within the town limits or close to the edges of the town:

- offices of Bobi urban council
- Bobi central market
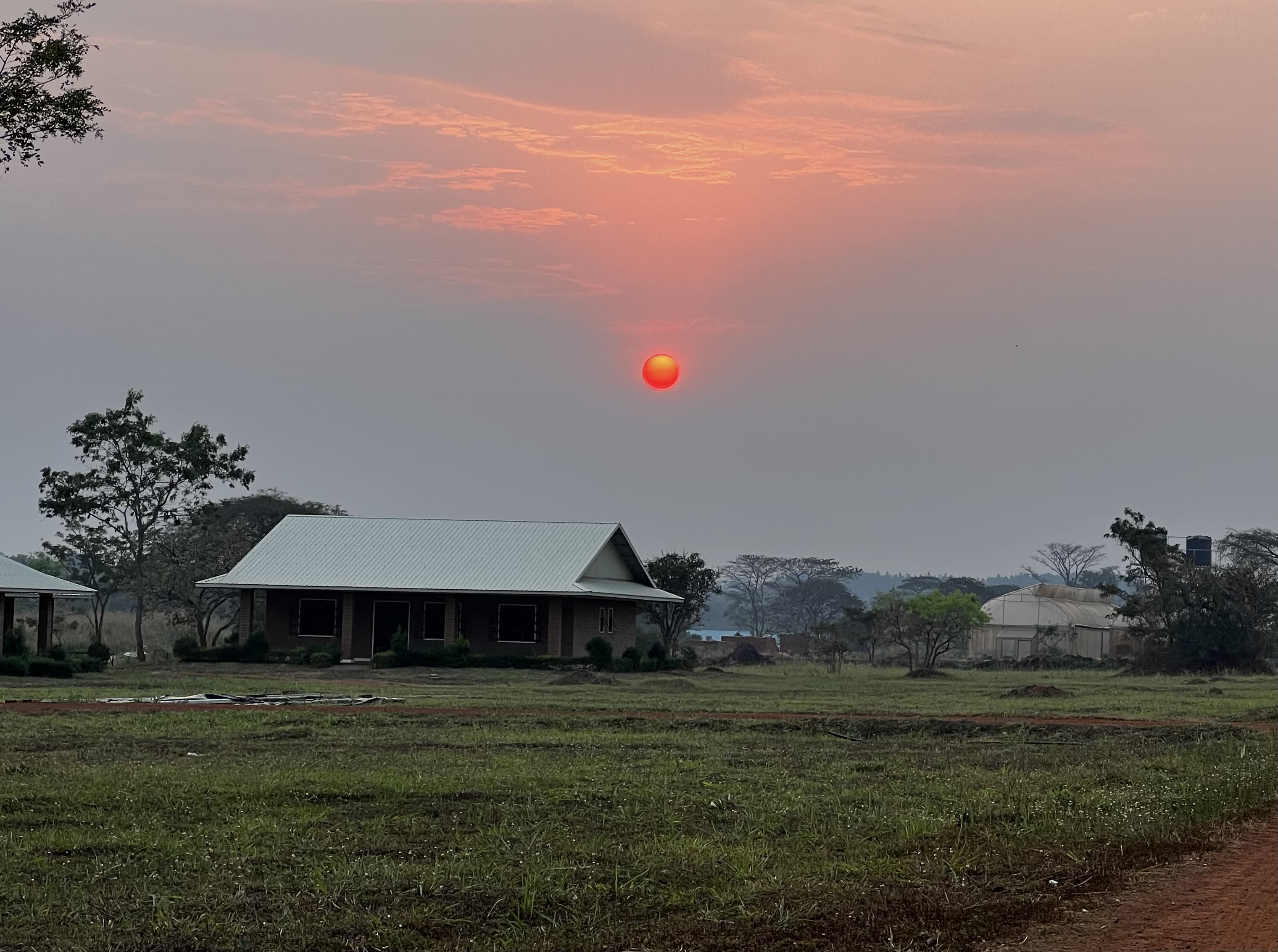
- Sunset in Bobi - greenhouse
  Kamdini–Gulu Road, passing through the middle of town.

== See also ==
- Acholi people
- List of roads in Uganda
- List of cities and towns in Uganda
