= Betty Amongi =

Ugandan politician

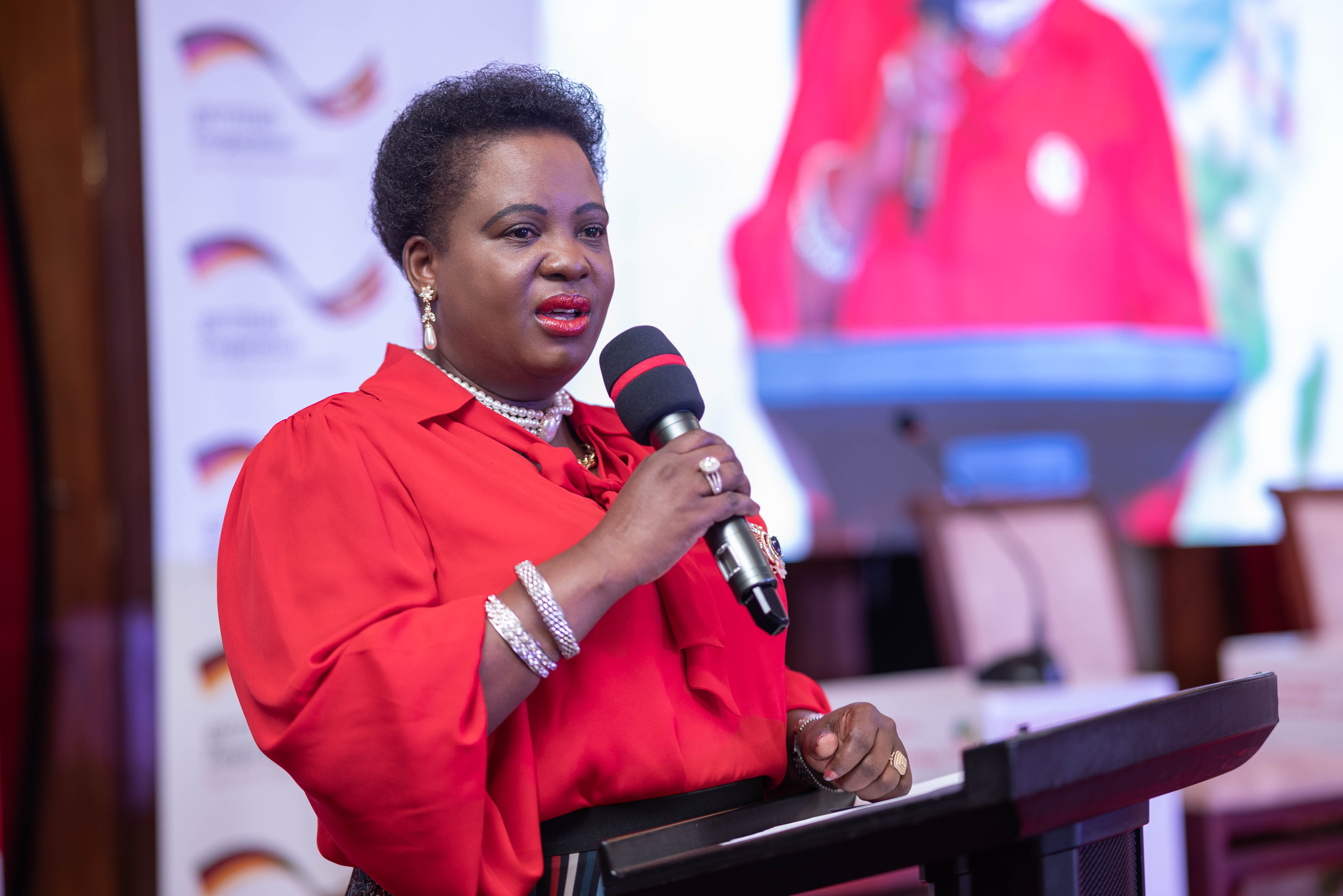
- Amongi in 2024
- Born: Betty Amongi Ongom; 15 November 1975 (age 50); Oyam District, Uganda
- Education: Makerere University (Bachelor of Arts in Political Science and Public Administration) (Master of Arts in International Relations and Diplomatic Studies)
- Occupation: Politician
- Years active: 1998–present
- Title: Minister of Gender, Labour and Social Development
- Spouse: Jimmy Akena (m. 2013)

Betty Amongi Akena, (née Betty Amongi Ongom), commonly known as Betty Amongi (born 15 November 1975) is a Ugandan politician. She was the Minister of Gender, Labour and Social Development in the Cabinet of Uganda, from 2021 to 2026. Previously, she served as the Cabinet Minister of Kampala Capital City and before that, from 6 June 2016 until 14 December 2019, as the Minister of Lands, Housing and Urban Development in Uganda's cabinet. She represented the Oyam South Constituency in the 11th Parliament (2021 to 2026).

== Early life and education ==
Betty Amongi was born in Oyam District, Lango sub-region, in the Northern Region of Uganda, on 15 November 1975. In 1996, she joined Makerere University, graduating with a Bachelor of Arts in political science and public administration. Later in 2009, she was awarded a Master of Arts in International relations and Diplomatic studies.

== Career ==
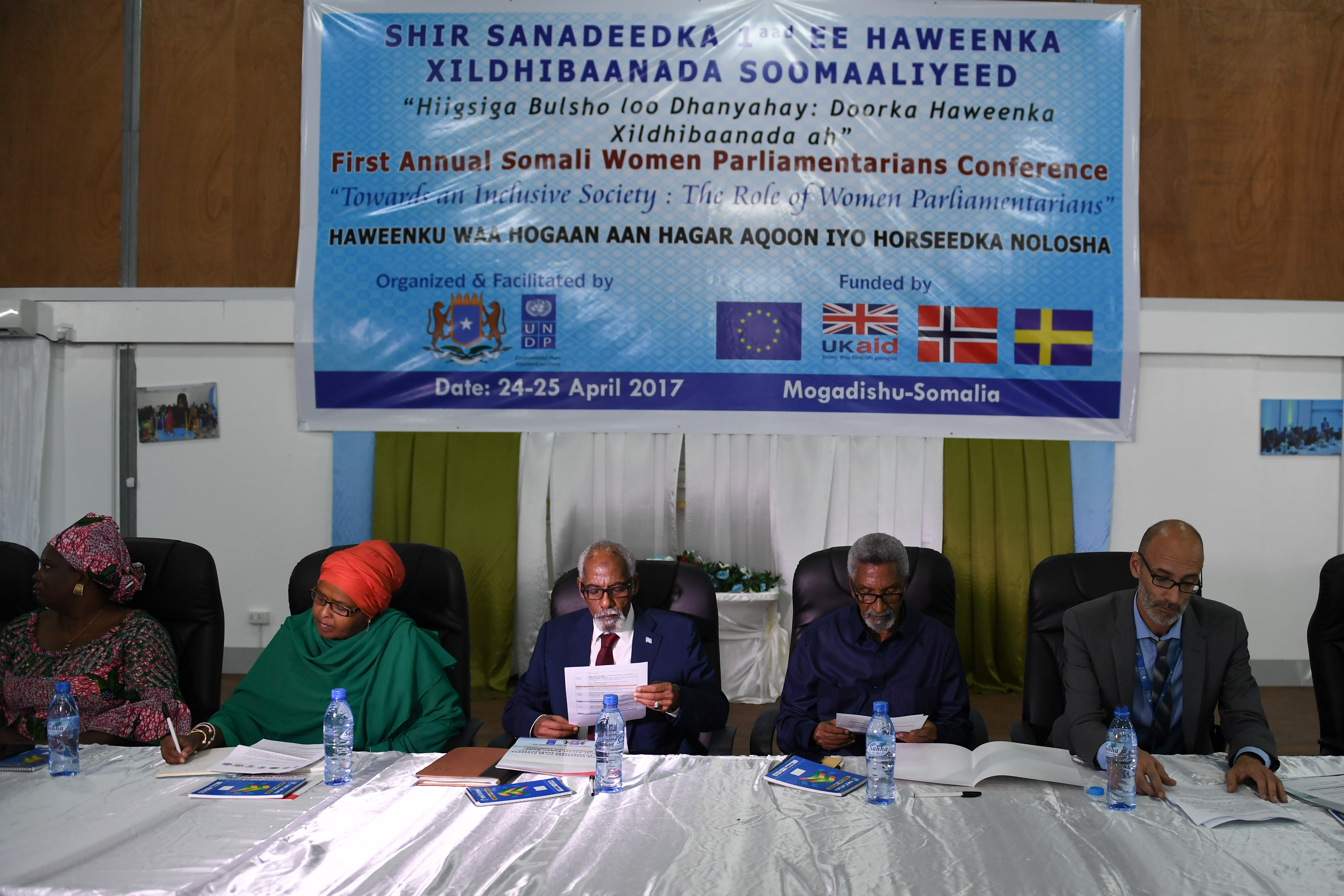
Left to right: A member of the Ugandan Parliament, Betty Amongi, the federal Minister for Women and Human Rights, Deeqa Yasin Yusuf, the Speaker of the House of the People, Mohamed Sheikh Osman Jawari, the Speaker of the Upper House Abdi Hashi Abdullahi and the UNDP Country Director for Somalia, George Conway, at the first Annual Somali women Parliamentarians conference in Mogadishu on April 24, 2017. UN Photo / Ilyas Ahmed

Betty Amongi was first elected to parliament in 2001 as the woman member of parliament for Apac district and was re-elected in 2006 before being elected as the woman member for parliament for Oyam South in 2011 and 2016. In a surprise move following the 20 February 2016 presidential and parliamentary elections, President Yoweri Museveni of the ruling National Resistance Movement political party, named her Minister of Lands, Housing and Urban Development, despite her affiliation to the opposition Uganda People's Congress.

In a cabinet reshuffle on 14 December 2019, she was named cabinet minister of Kampala Capital City, switching dockets with Beti Kamya-Turwomwe, who took over at Lands, Housing and Urban Development.

In June 2021, Amongi was appointed Minister of Gender, Labour and Social Development in the new cabinet.

She was not included in the 2026 cabinet.

She also lost her parliamentary seat after switching her base to contest for the Lira City Woman MP seat and was defeated by the then health minister Hon. Jene Ruth Aceng, against whom Betty Amongi stood in the 2026 January general elections.

== Personal life ==
On 6 April 2013, Betty Amongi married Jimmy Akena, the member of Parliament for Lira Municipality and president of the opposition Uganda People's Congress. Jimmy Akena is the son of Milton Obote, the two-time former Prime Minister and President of Uganda. The traditional marriage took place in Minakulu sub-county, Oyam District and was attended by 32 members of parliament. President Yoweri Museveni, a friend of the couple, also attended the wedding.

== See also ==
- Cabinet of Uganda
- Parliament of Uganda
- Michael Moses Odongo Okune
