= Judith Alyek =

Ugandan politician

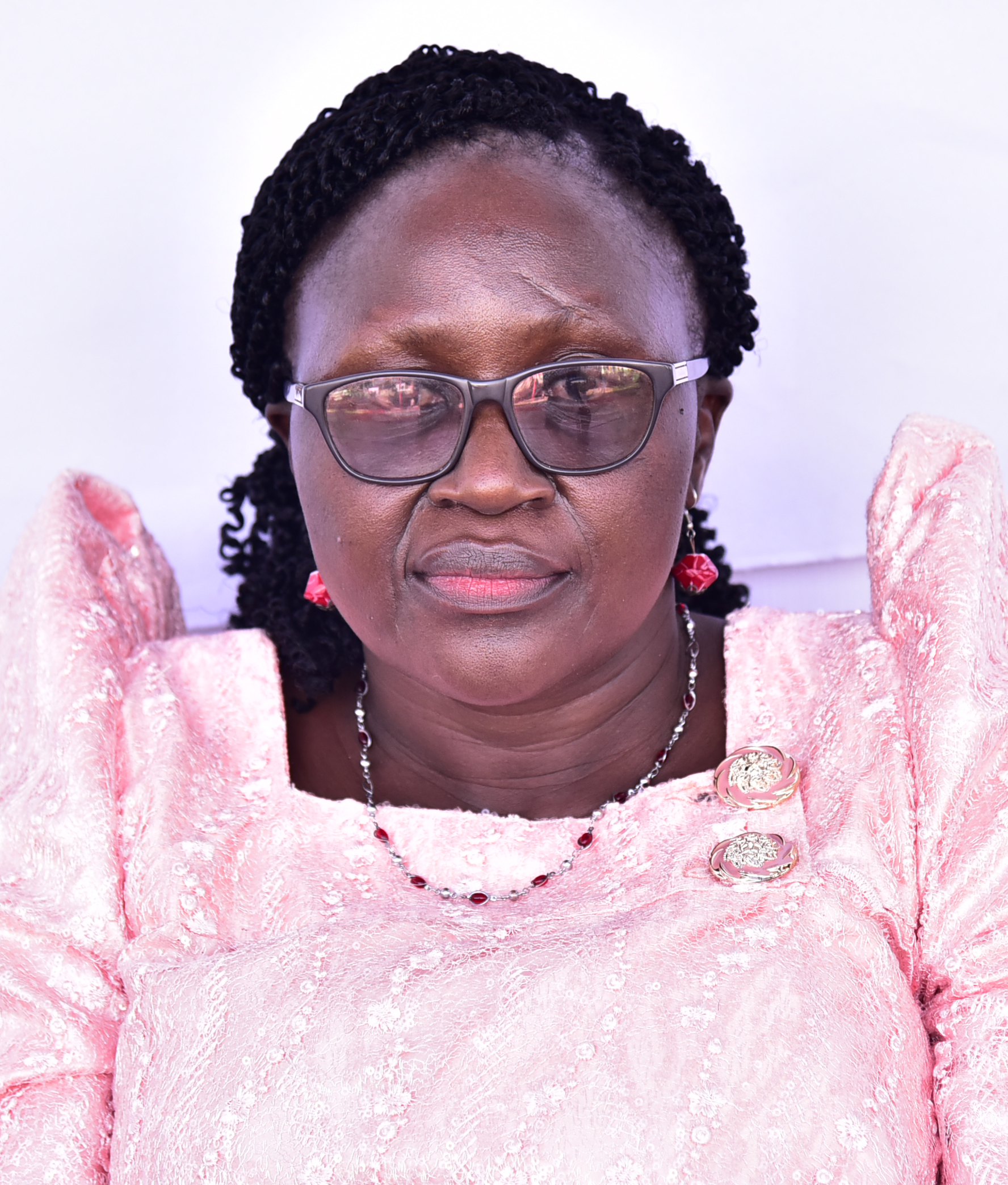
- Constituency: Kole District

Member of Parliament
- Incumbent
- Assumed office 2016

Personal details
- Born: Uganda
- Party: National Resistance Movement
- Education: Atan Primary School in Kole District; St. Catherine SS in Lira; Dr. Obote College in Boroboro
- Occupation: Politician

Judith Alyek is a Ugandan politician and the district Woman Representative for Kole District in Uganda's 10th Parliament. She is a member of the National Resistance Movement on whose ticket she ran on in the 2016 and 2021 general elections. She served as the Chairperson on the Committee on HIV/AIDS and related matters in 10th Parliament and Chairperson of Equal Opportunities Committee in 11th Parliament.

Judith Alyek was elected Chairperson of Lango Parliamentary Group a position she held in the 11th Parliament.

In the 11th parliament she serves on the Committee on Equal Opportunities.

== Early life and education ==
Judith Alyek was born in Northern Uganda on 8 October 1971. She attended primary at Atan Primary School in Kole District. Between 1987 and 1990, she attended St. Catherine SS in Lira for her O Levels and attained her UACE from Dr. Obote College, Boroboro in 1993. She attained diploma in environmental health science in 1998 at Makerere University. She graduated at Uganda Martrys University with advanced diploma in health promotion and education in 2006. Alyek attained Bachelor's degree in health services management from Islamic University in 2911 and Master's degree in public health from International health sciences University in 2015.

== Career ==
Here is a detailed career history of Alyek:

- 2016 to date: District Women's Representative, Kole District
- 2011–2015: Technical Advisor, Maternal and Child Health, HIV/AIDS and Nutrition, AVSI Foundation
- 2007–2010: Senior Health Educator, Dokolo District local government.
- 2000–2006: Health Inspector, Lira District local government.
- 2021: Parliamentary woman representative for Kole District.

== Memberships ==
She serves on the following additional role of the Parliament of Uganda:

- Chairman – Committee on HIV/AIDS and related diseases
- Member – Business Committee
- Member – Committee on Health
- Member – Uganda Women Parliamentary Association (UWOPA)
- Member – Board of the Uganda Aids Commission
- Patron – SERVE Uganda
- Member – International Union of Health Promotion and Education (IUHPE)

== Activism ==
As chairperson for the committee on HIV/AIDS and related diseases, she has called for the mandatory testing of men for HIV/AIDS. She has also called for local leaders to disclose their HIV status as an example to the people they lead.

In July 2017, she moved a motion for the implementation of all policies and legislation relating to children. She urged for the formation of an authority that would make it easy to monitor and implement children's rights

In the wake of the death of Dickens Okello in 2018, she urged fellow members of parliament from the Lango region to review and recommend actions to be taken against "Indians who are accused of violating the rights of the people of Lango."

== Marriage ==
In 2017, she claimed to be married to Richard Odongo.In 2025, Alyek married Mr. Okwir Mugenyi Moses of Amolatar District.

== See also ==
- Kole District
- List of members of the tenth Parliament of Uganda
- Parliament of Uganda
