= Oyam, Uganda =

Oyam
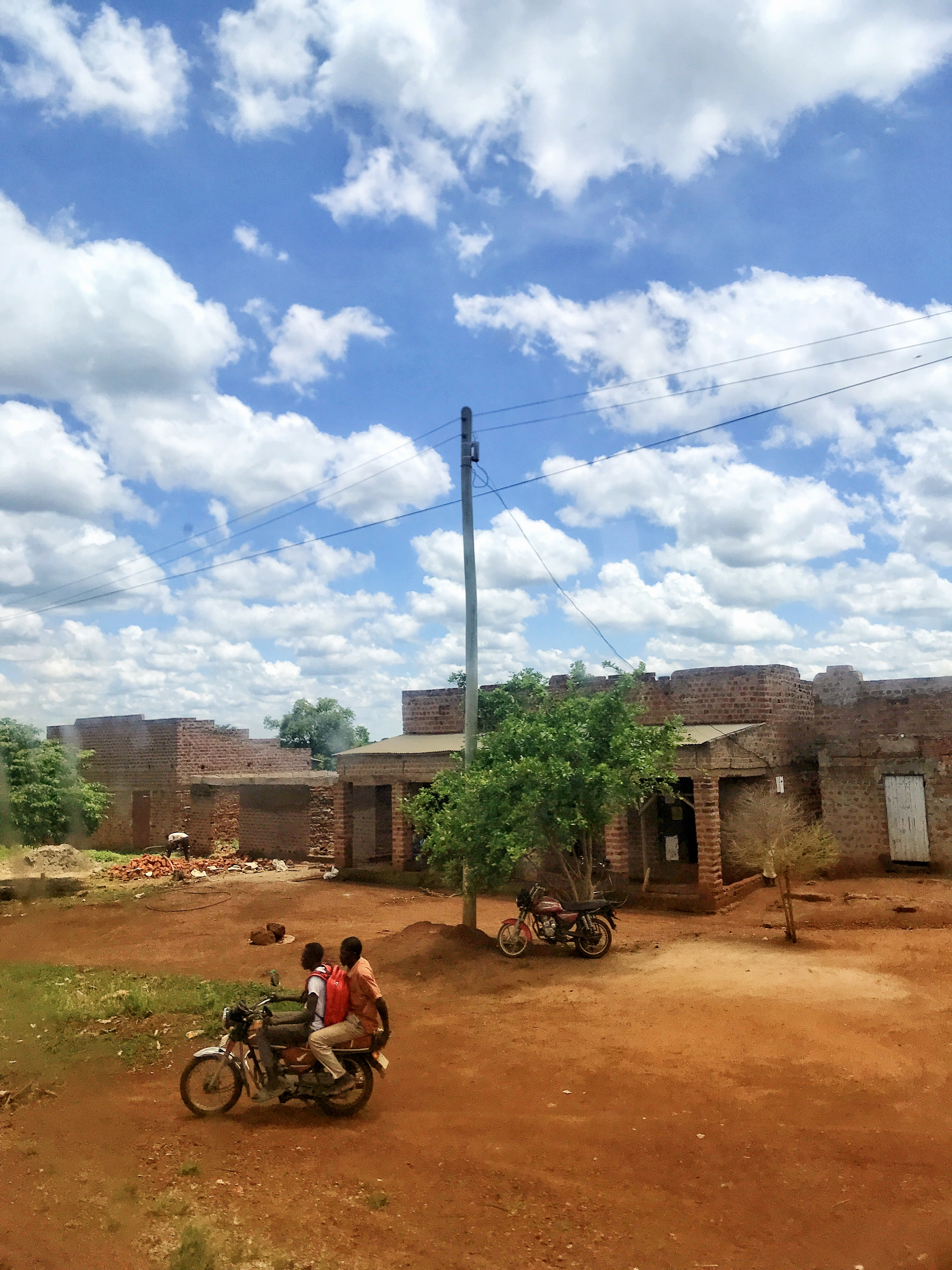
- Part of Oyam

- Location in Uganda
- Coordinates: 02°14′06″N 32°23′06″E
- Country: Uganda
- Region: Northern Uganda
- Sub-region: Lango sub-region
- District: Oyam District
- Elevation: 3,000 ft (900 m)

Population (2011 Estimate)
  - Total: 14,500

Oyam is a town in the Northern Region of Uganda. It is the primary municipal, administrative, and commercial centre of Oyam District.

== Geography ==
Oyam is bordered by Anyeke to the north, Loro to the east, Adiegi to the south, Aber to the southwest, and Pamwa to the northwest. The town is approximately 78 kilometres (48 mi), by road, west of Lira, the largest city in Lango sub-region. The coordinates of the town are 2°14'06.0"N, 32°23'06.0"E (Latitude:2.2350; Longitude:32.3850).

== Population ==
The 2002 national census estimated the town population at 10,600. In 2010, the Uganda Bureau of Statistics (UBOS) estimated the population at 14,000. In 2011, UBOS estimated the mid-year population at 14,500.

== Points of interest ==
The following points of interest lie within the town or close to its edges:

- headquarters of Oyam District Administration
- offices of Oyam Town Council
- Oyam central market
- Kamdini-Lira Highway, immediately south of Oyam's town limits
- Tochi River, within walking distance to the west of Oyam
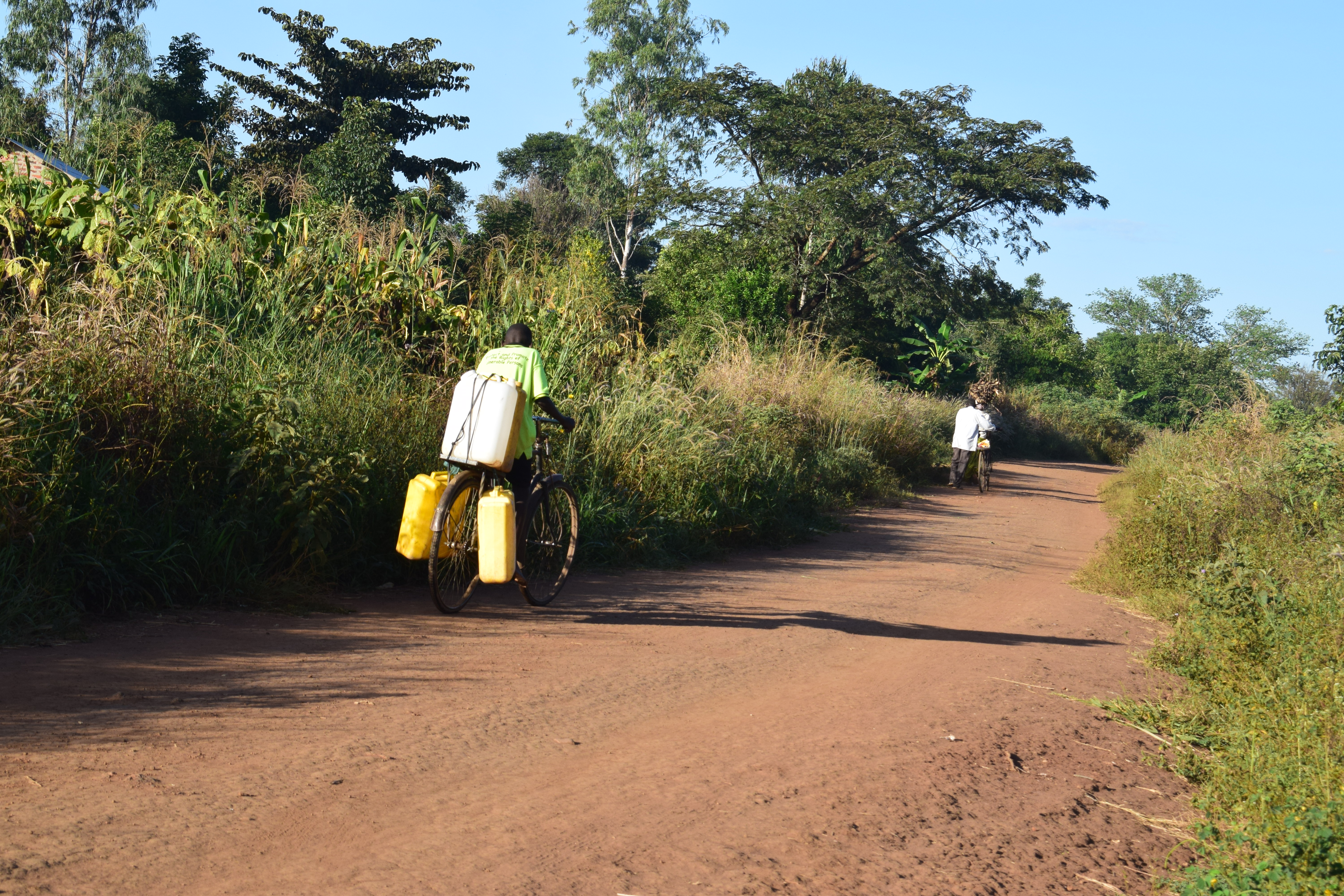
- Murram road in Oyam district
  Loro market

== See also ==
- Langi people
- Murchison Falls National Park
- List of cities and towns in Uganda
