= Gulu District =

District in Northern Region of Uganda

Gulu District Acholi region
- neucleated District
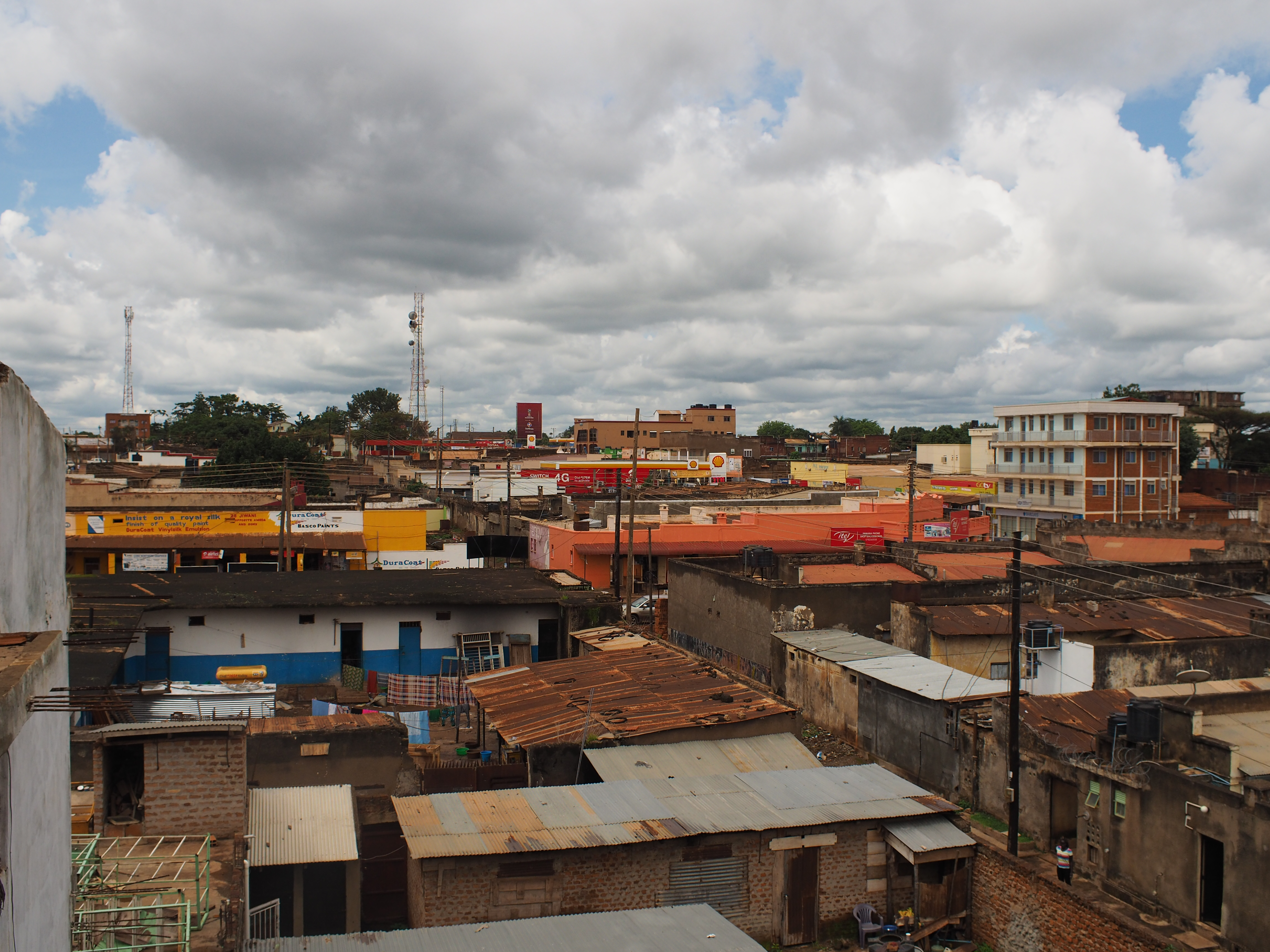

- District location in Uganda
- Coordinates: 02°45′N 32°00′E
- Country: Uganda
- Region: Northern Region of Uganda
- Sub-region: Acholi sub-region
- Seat: Gulu District Headquarter

Government
  - LCV Chairman: Obol Justine Simpleman, 2026 - present

Area
  - Total: 3,452.1 km^{2} (1,332.9 sq mi)

Population (2012 Estimate)
  - Total: 396,500
  - Density: 114.9/km^{2} (298/sq mi)
- Time zone: UTC+3 (EAT)
- Website: www.gulu.go.ug

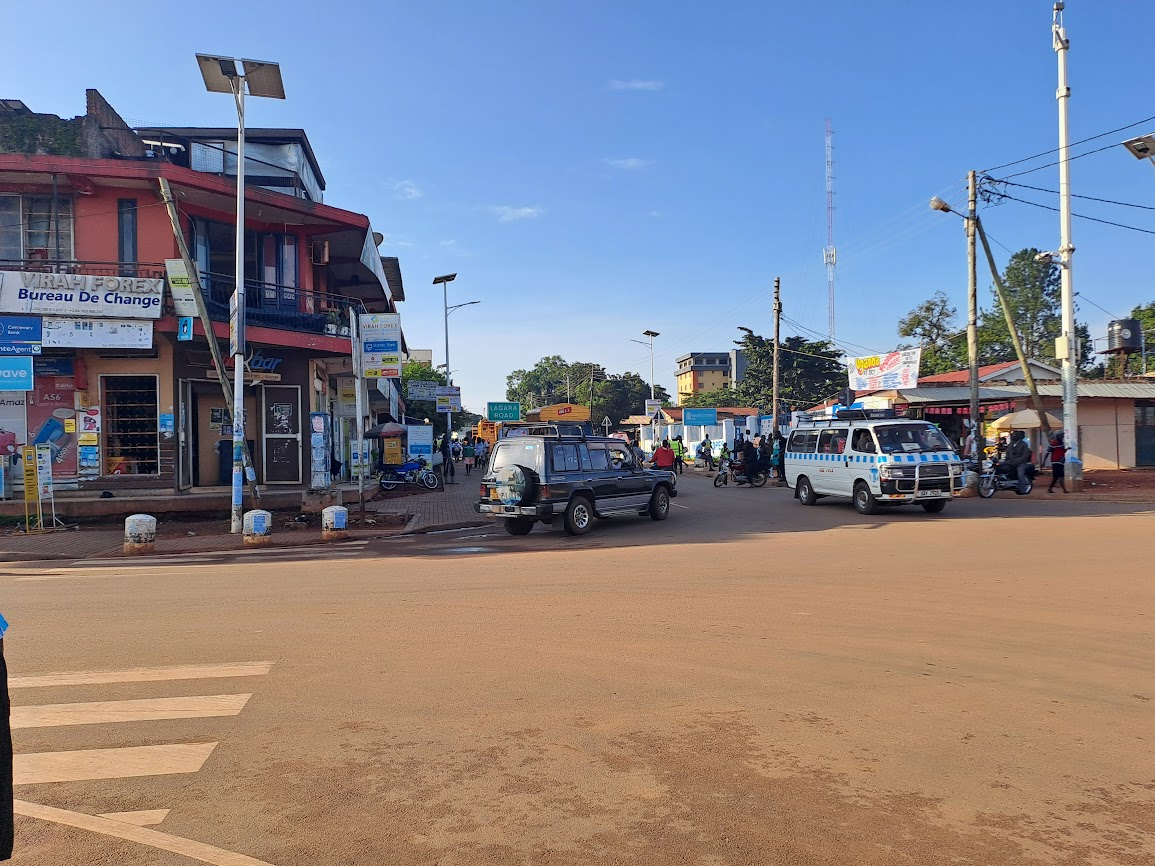
Gulu City

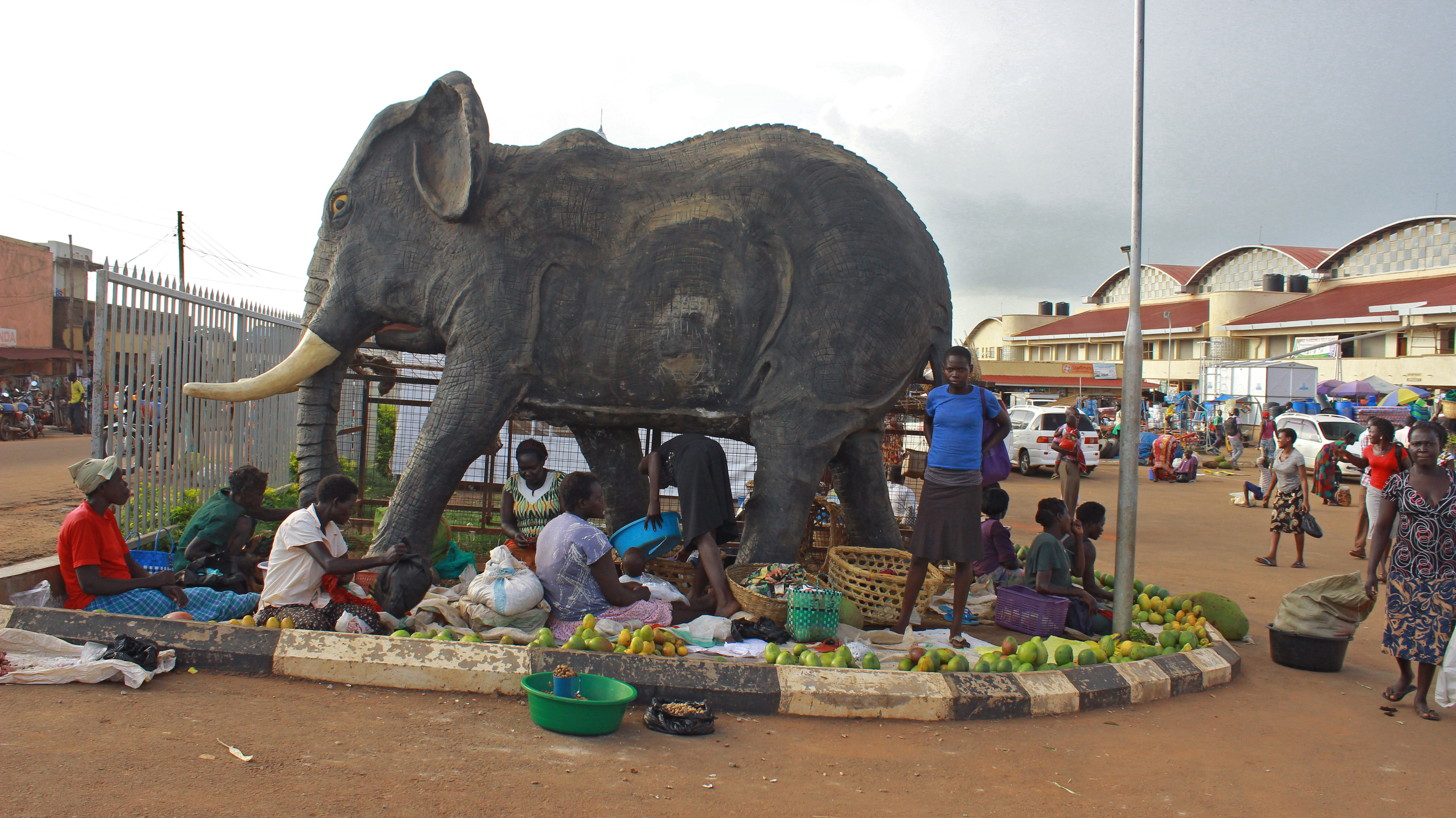
Women Seated under an Elephant Statue in a Market Entrance in Gulu District, Uganda.

Gulu is a district in the Northern Region of Uganda. The regional headquarters are located in the city of Gulu, which is also the administrative capital of Northern Uganda. the district consists of two main divisions, Gulu West and Gulu East.

== Location ==
Gulu District is bordered by Lamwo District to the north, Pader District and Omoro District to the east, Oyam District to the south, Nwoya District to the southwest, and Amuru District to the west. The district headquarters in the city of Gulu are 333 kilometres (207 mi), by road, north of Uganda's capital city, Kampala. The coordinates of the district are, near the city of Gulu are: 02°49'50.0"N, 32°19'13.0"E (Latitude:2.830556; Longitude:32.320278).

== Overview ==
As of November 2019, the district was one of the eight districts that constituted the Acholi sub-region, the historical homeland of the Acholi ethnic group. The district is composed of Aswa County and the Gulu Municipal Council. The economic activity of 90 per cent of the population in the district is subsistence agriculture.

The district has been the location of much of the fighting between the Ugandan army and the Lord's Resistance Army. Over 90 percent of the population has returned to their villages after more than two decades of living in what were known as "Internally Displaced People Camps."

== Population ==
The national census conducted in 2002 put the population at 193,337. In the 2014 national census and household survey, the population of Gulu District was enumerated at 275,613.

== Economic activity ==
- Wholesale and Retail sales
- Boda-boda Business
- Construction
- Crop Production
- Transport and communication

== Livestock ==
- Cattle
- Pig
- Sheep
- Goat

== See also ==
- Northern Region, Uganda
- Districts of Uganda
- Acholi people
- Gulu Women with Disabilities Union
