= Oyam District =

- District
- District location in Uganda
- Coordinates: 02°14′N 32°23′E
- Country: Uganda
- Region: Northern Uganda
- Sub-region: Lango sub-region
- Capital: Oyam

Area
  - Total: 2,190.8 km^{2} (845.9 sq mi)

Population (2012 Estimate)
  - Total: 378,900
  - Density: 173/km^{2} (450/sq mi)
- Time zone: UTC+3 (EAT)
- Website: Official Homepage

Oyam District is a district in Northern Uganda. Like most Ugandan districts, it is named after its 'chief town', Oyam, where the district headquarters are located.

== Location ==
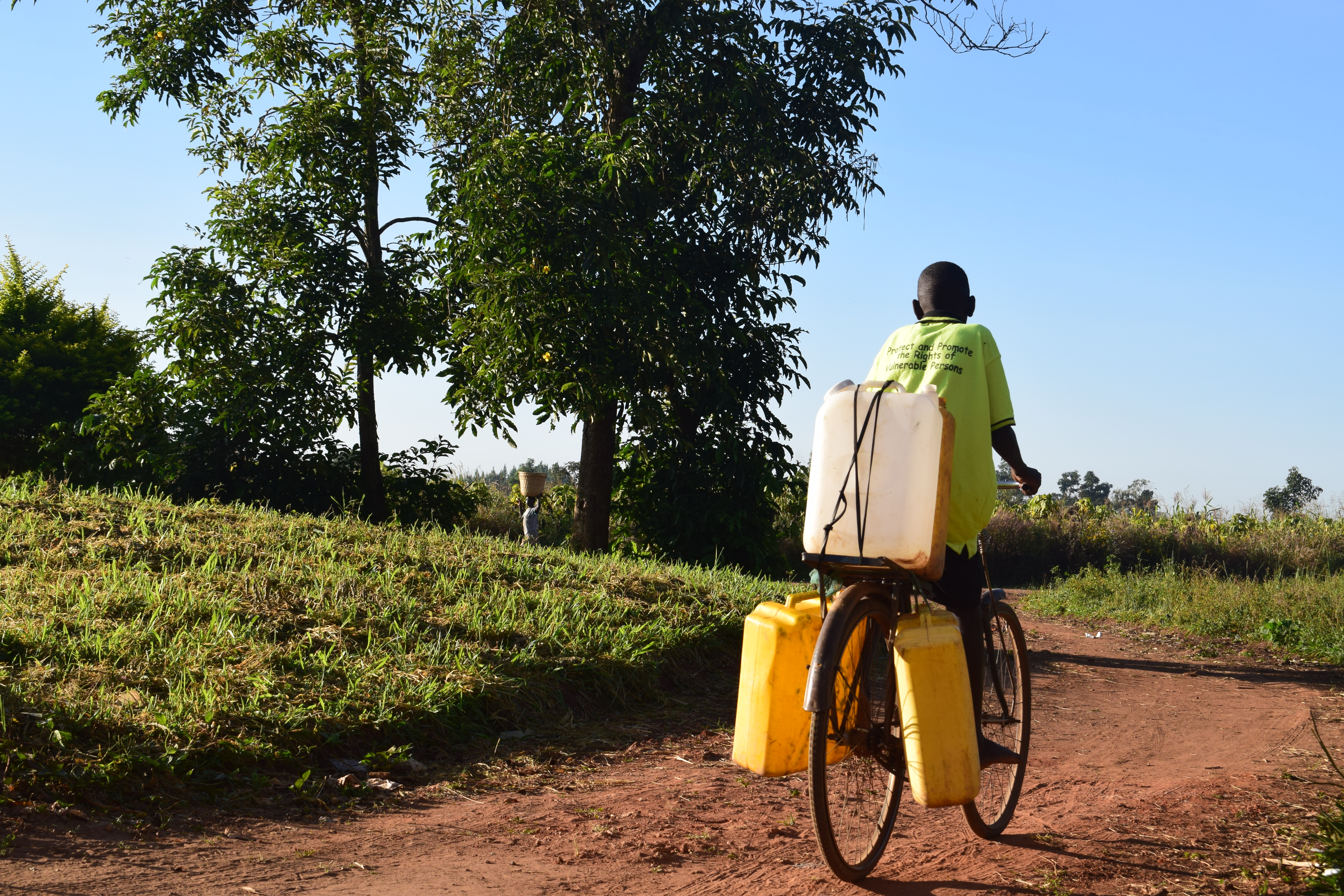
Boy cycling in Oyam District

Oyam District is bordered by Gulu District to the north, Pader District to the northeast, Kole District to the east, Apac District to the south, Kiryandongo District to the southwest and Nwoya District to the west. The administrative headquarters of the district at Oyam, are located approximately 78 kilometres (48 mi), by road, west of Lira, the largest city in the sub-region. The coordinates of the district are: 02 14N, 32 23E.

== Overview ==
Oyam District was established by the Ugandan Parliament in 2006. Prior to that, Oyam District was part of Apac District. Together with Lira District, Alebtong District, Amolatar District, Apac District, Dokolo District, Kole District, Otuke District, Oyam District is part of the larger Lango sub-region, home to an estimated 1.5 million Lango. The district is a predominantly rural district.

== Population ==
The 1991 census estimated the district population at about 177,100. The 2002 census estimated the population of the district at about 268,400. The district population was growing at an annual rate of 3.5%, at that time. It was estimated that the population of the district in 2012 was approximately 378,900.

== Economic activities ==
Subsistence agriculture and animal husbandry are main economic activities in the district. The major crops grown include:

- Cotton
- Bananas
- Matooke
- Beans
- Millet
- Pineapples
- Cassava
- Sweet potatoes
- Soya beans

== Livestock kept in the district includes: ==
- Cattle
- Goats
- Sheep
- Pigs
- Chicken
- Rabbits
- Duck
- Turkey

== See also ==
- Oyam
- Lango
- The Langi
- Northern Uganda
- Uganda Districts
