= ISO 3166-2:UG =

Entry for Uganda in ISO 3166-2

ISO 3166-2:UG is the entry for Uganda in ISO 3166-2, part of the ISO 3166 standard published by the International Organization for Standardization (ISO), which defines codes for the names of the principal subdivisions (e.g., provinces or states) of all countries coded in ISO 3166-1.

Currently for Uganda, ISO 3166-2 codes are defined for four geographical regions, 134 districts and one city (the capital of the country, Kampala).

Each code consists of two parts separated by a hyphen. The first part is UG, the ISO 3166-1 alpha-2 code of Uganda. The second part is either of the following:

- one letter: geographical regions
- three digits: districts and city

For the districts, the first digit indicates the geographical region where the district is in:

- 1: Central
- 2: Eastern
- 3: Northern
- 4: Western

== Current codes ==
Subdivision names are listed as in the ISO 3166-2 standard published by the ISO 3166 Maintenance Agency (ISO 3166/MA).

Click on the button in the header to sort each column.

=== Geographical regions ===
Code	Subdivision name (en)
UG-C	Central
UG-E	Eastern
UG-N	Northern
UG-W	Western

=== Districts and cities ===
Code	Subdivision name (en)	Subdivision category	In geographical region
UG-314	Abim	district	N
UG-301	Adjumani	district	N
UG-322	Agago	district	N
UG-323	Alebtong	district	N
UG-315	Amolatar	district	N
UG-324	Amudat	district	N
UG-216	Amuria	district	E
UG-316	Amuru	district	N
UG-302	Apac	district	N
UG-303	Arua	district	N
UG-217	Budaka	district	E
UG-218	Bududa	district	E
UG-201	Bugiri	district	E
UG-235	Bugweri	district	E
UG-420	Buhweju	district	W
UG-117	Buikwe	district	C
UG-219	Bukedea	district	E
UG-118	Bukomansibi	district	C
UG-220	Bukwo	district	E
UG-225	Bulambuli	district	E
UG-416	Buliisa	district	W
UG-401	Bundibugyo	district	W
UG-430	Bunyangabu	district	W
UG-402	Bushenyi	district	W
UG-202	Busia	district	E
UG-221	Butaleja	district	E
UG-119	Butambala	district	C
UG-233	Butebo	district	E
UG-120	Buvuma	district	C
UG-226	Buyende	district	E
UG-317	Dokolo	district	N
UG-121	Gomba	district	C
UG-304	Gulu	district	N
UG-403	Hoima	district	W
UG-417	Ibanda	district	W
UG-203	Iganga	district	E
UG-418	Isingiro	district	W
UG-204	Jinja	district	E
UG-318	Kaabong	district	N
UG-404	Kabale	district	W
UG-405	Kabarole	district	W
UG-213	Kaberamaido	district	E
UG-427	Kagadi	district	W
UG-428	Kakumiro	district	W
UG-237	Kalaki	district	E
UG-101	Kalangala	district	C
UG-222	Kaliro	district	E
UG-122	Kalungu	district	C
UG-102	Kampala	city	C
UG-205	Kamuli	district	E
UG-413	Kamwenge	district	W
UG-414	Kanungu	district	W
UG-206	Kapchorwa	district	E
UG-236	Kapelebyong	district	E
UG-335	Karenga	district	N
UG-126	Kasanda	district	C
UG-406	Kasese	district	W
UG-207	Katakwi	district	E
UG-112	Kayunga	district	C
UG-433	Kazo	district	W
UG-407	Kibaale	district	W
UG-103	Kiboga	district	C
UG-227	Kibuku	district	E
UG-432	Kikuube	district	W
UG-419	Kiruhura	district	W
UG-421	Kiryandongo	district	W
UG-408	Kisoro	district	W
UG-434	Kitagwenda	district	W
UG-305	Kitgum	district	N
UG-319	Koboko	district	N
UG-325	Kole	district	N
UG-306	Kotido	district	N
UG-208	Kumi	district	E
UG-333	Kwania	district	N
UG-228	Kween	district	E
UG-123	Kyankwanzi	district	C
UG-422	Kyegegwa	district	W
UG-415	Kyenjojo	district	W
UG-125	Kyotera	district	C
UG-326	Lamwo	district	N
UG-307	Lira	district	N
UG-229	Luuka	district	E
UG-104	Luwero	district	C
UG-124	Lwengo	district	C
UG-114	Lyantonde	district	C
UG-336	Madi-Okollo	district	N
UG-223	Manafwa	district	E
UG-320	Maracha	district	N
UG-105	Masaka	district	C
UG-409	Masindi	district	W
UG-214	Mayuge	district	E
UG-209	Mbale	district	E
UG-410	Mbarara	district	W
UG-423	Mitooma	district	W
UG-115	Mityana	district	C
UG-308	Moroto	district	N
UG-309	Moyo	district	N
UG-106	Mpigi	district	C
UG-107	Mubende	district	C
UG-108	Mukono	district	C
UG-334	Nabilatuk	district	N
UG-311	Nakapiripirit	district	N
UG-116	Nakaseke	district	C
UG-109	Nakasongola	district	C
UG-230	Namayingo	district	E
UG-234	Namisindwa	district	E
UG-224	Namutumba	district	E
UG-327	Napak	district	N
UG-310	Nebbi	district	N
UG-231	Ngora	district	E
UG-424	Ntoroko	district	W
UG-411	Ntungamo	district	W
UG-328	Nwoya	district	N
UG-337	Obongi	district	N
UG-331	Omoro	district	N
UG-329	Otuke	district	N
UG-321	Oyam	district	N
UG-312	Pader	district	N
UG-332	Pakwach	district	N
UG-210	Pallisa	district	E
UG-110	Rakai	district	C
UG-429	Rubanda	district	W
UG-425	Rubirizi	district	W
UG-431	Rukiga	district	W
UG-412	Rukungiri	district	W
UG-435	Rwampara	district	W
UG-111	Sembabule	district	C
UG-232	Serere	district	E
UG-426	Sheema	district	W
UG-215	Sironko	district	E
UG-211	Soroti	district	E
UG-212	Tororo	district	E
UG-113	Wakiso	district	C
UG-313	Yumbe	district	N
UG-330	Zombo	district	N

== Changes ==
The following changes to the entry have been announced by the ISO 3166/MA since the first publication of ISO 3166-2 in 1998. ISO stopped issuing newsletters in 2013.

Newsletter	Date issued	Description of change in newsletter	Code/Subdivision change
Newsletter I-3	2002-08-20	Addition of 6 new districts	Subdivisions added: UG-AJM Adjumani; UG-BUG Bugiri; UG-BUA Busia; UG-KAT Katakwi; UG-NAK Nakasongola; UG-SEM Sembabule
Newsletter I-5	2003-09-05	Addition of 11 new districts. List source updated. Code source updated	Subdivisions added: UG-213 Kaberamaido; UG-413 Kamwenge; UG-414 Kanungu; UG-112 Kayunga; UG-415 Kyenjojo; UG-214 Mayuge; UG-311 Nakapiripirit; UG-312 Pader; UG-215 Sironko; UG-113 Wakiso; UG-313 Yumbe; Codes: format changed (see below)
Newsletter I-9	2007-11-28	Addition of administrative divisions and their codes	Subdivisions added: UG-317 Abim; UG-314 Amolatar; UG-216 Amuria; UG-319 Amuru; UG-217 Budaka; UG-218 Bukwo; UG-419 Bulisa; UG-219 Butaleja; UG-318 Dokolo; UG-416 Ibanda; UG-417 Isingiro; UG-315 Kaabong; UG-220 Kaliro; UG-418 Kiruhura; UG-316 Koboko; UG-221 Manafwa; UG-320 Maracha; UG-114 Mityana; UG-115 Nakaseke; UG-222 Namutumba; UG-321 Oyam
Newsletter II-1	2010-02-03 (corrected 2010-02-19)	Addition of the country code prefix as the first code element, administrative update, alphabetical re-ordering	Subdivisions added: UG-223 Bududa; UG-224 Bukedea; UG-116 Lyantonde
Online Browsing; Platform (OBP)	2014-11-03	Add 32 districts UG-117 to UG- 124, UG-225 to UG-232, UG-322 to UG-331 and UG-420 to UG-425; change subdivision category from district to city for UG-102	(TBD)
Online Browsing; Platform (OBP)	2016-11-15	Update Code Source; update List Source; change of parent subdivision of UG-325; deletion of asterisks from districts; change of subdivision code from UG-114 to UG-115, UG-115 to UG-116, UG-116 to UG-114, UG-218 to UG-220, UG-219 to UG-221, UG-220 to UG-222, UG-221 to UG-223, UG-222 to UG-224, UG-223 to UG-218, UG-224 to UG-219, UG-314 to UG-315, UG-315 to UG-318, UG-316 to UG-319, UG-317 to UG-314, UG-318 to UG-317, UG-319 to UG-316, UG-325 to UG-420, UG-326 to UG-325, UG-327 to UG-326, UG-328 to UG-327, UG-329 to UG-328, UG-330 to UG-329, UG-331 to UG-330, UG-416 to UG-417, UG-417 to UG-418, UG-418 to UG-419, UG-419 to UG-416, UG-420 to UG-421, UG-421 to UG-422, UG-422 to UG-423, UG-423 to UG-424, UG-424 to UG-425, UG-425 to UG-426	(TBD)
Online Browsing; Platform (OBP)	2017-11-23	Addition of districts UG-125, UG-233, UG-234, UG-331, UG-332, UG-427, UG-428, UG-429, UG-430, UG-431; update List Source	(TBD)
Online Browsing; Platform (OBP)	2018-11-26	Addition of districts UG-126, UG-235, UG-236, UG-333, UG-334, UG-432; Update List Source	(TBD)
Online Browsing; Platform (OBP)	2020-11-24	Addition of district UG-237, UG-335, UG-336, UG-337, UG-433, UG-434, UG-435; Change of spelling of UG-220; Removal of an asterisk from UG-125, UG-126, UG-233, UG-234, UG-235, UG-236, UG-331, UG-332, UG-333, UG-334, UG-427, UG-428, UG-429, UG-430, UG-431, UG-432	(TBD)

=== Codes changed in Newsletter I-5 ===
Before	After	Subdivision name
UG-AJM	UG-301	Adjumani
UG-APA	UG-302	Apac
UG-ARU	UG-303	Arua
UG-BUG	UG-201	Bugiri
UG-BUN	UG-401	Bundibugyo
UG-BUS	UG-402	Bushenyi
UG-BUA	UG-202	Busia
UG-GUL	UG-304	Gulu
UG-HOI	UG-403	Hoima
UG-IGA	UG-203	Iganga
UG-JIN	UG-204	Jinja
UG-KBL	UG-404	Kabale
UG-KBR	UG-405	Kabarole
UG-KLG	UG-101	Kalangala
UG-KLA	UG-102	Kampala
UG-KLI	UG-205	Kamuli
UG-KAP	UG-206	Kapchorwa
UG-KAS	UG-406	Kasese
UG-KAT	UG-207	Katakwi
UG-KLE	UG-407	Kibaale
UG-KIB	UG-103	Kiboga
UG-KIS	UG-408	Kisoro
UG-KIT	UG-305	Kitgum
UG-KOT	UG-306	Kotido
UG-KUM	UG-208	Kumi
UG-LIR	UG-307	Lira
UG-LUW	UG-104	Luwero
UG-MSK	UG-105	Masaka
UG-MSI	UG-409	Masindi
UG-MBL	UG-209	Mbale
UG-MBR	UG-410	Mbarara
UG-MOR	UG-308	Moroto
UG-MOY	UG-309	Moyo
UG-MPI	UG-106	Mpigi
UG-MUB	UG-107	Mubende
UG-MUK	UG-108	Mukono
UG-NAK	UG-109	Nakasongola
UG-NEB	UG-310	Nebbi
UG-NTU	UG-411	Ntungamo
UG-PAL	UG-210	Pallisa
UG-RAK	UG-110	Rakai
UG-RUK	UG-412	Rukungiri
UG-SEM	UG-111	Sembabule
UG-SOR	UG-211	Soroti
UG-TOR	UG-212	Tororo

== See also ==
- Subdivisions of Uganda
- FIPS region codes of Uganda
- Neighbouring countries: CD, KE, RW, SS, TZ
