= List of constituencies in Uganda =

The following is a list of constituencies (electoral districts) of Uganda. There are 353 single-member districts which each elect one member of the Parliament of Uganda.

== List ==
Constituency	District
Adjumani East	Adjumani District
Adjumani West	Adjumani District
Agago	Agago District
Agago North	Agago District
Agago West	Agago District
Agule	Pallisa District
Ajuri	Alebtong District
Amuria	Amuria District
Apac Municipality	Apac District
Aringa	Yumbe District
Aringa East	Yumbe District
Aringa North	Yumbe District
Aringa South	Yumbe District
Arua Central	Arua City
Aruu	Pader District
Aruu North	Pader District
Aswa	Gulu District
Ayiivu East	Arua City
Ayiivu West	Arua City
Bamunanika	Luwero District
Bbaale	Kayunga District
Bokora	Napak District
Bokora East	Napak District
Bubulo East	Namisindwa District
Bubulo West	Manafwa District
Budadiri East	Sironko District
Budadiri West	Sironko District
Budaka	Budaka District
Budiope East	Buyende District
Budiope West	Buyende District
Budyebo	Nakasongola District
Bufumbira East	Kisoro District
Bufumbira North	Kisoro District
Bufumbira South	Kisoro District
Bugabula North	Kamuli District
Bugabula South	Kamuli District
Bugahya	Hoima District
Bugangaizi East	Kakumiro District
Bugangaizi South	Kakumiro District
Bugangaizi West	Kakumiro District
Bughendera	Bundibugyo District
Bugiri Municipality	Bugiri District
Bugweri	Bugweri District
Buhaguzi	Kikuube District
Buhaguzi East	Kikuube District
Buhweju	Buhweju District
Buhweju West	Buhweju District
Buikwe South	Buikwe District
Bujenje	Masindi District
Bujumba	Kalangala District
Bukanga	Isingiro District
Bukanga North	Isingiro District
Bukedea	Bukedea District
Bukholi Islands	Namayingo District
Bukholi South	Namayingo District
Bukhooli Central	Bugiri District
Bukhooli North	Bugiri District
Bukimbiri	Kisoro District
Bukomansimbi North	Bukomansimbi District
Bukomansimbi South	Bukomansimbi District
Bukono	Namutumba District
Bukonzo East	Kasese District
Bukonzo West	Kasese District
Bukoto Central	Masaka District
Bukoto East	Masaka District
Bukoto Mid-West	Lwengo District
Bukoto South	Lwengo District
Bukoto West	Lwengo District
Bukuya	Kassanda District
Bukyigai	Bududa District
Bulambuli	Bulambuli District
Bulamogi	Kaliro District
Bulamogi North West	Kaliro District
Buliisa	Buliisa District
Bungokho Central	Mbale District
Bungokho North	Mbale District
Bungokho South	Mbale District
Bunya East	Mayuge District
Bunya South	Mayuge District
Bunya West	Mayuge District
Bunyangabu	Bunyangabu District
Bunyaruguru	Rubirizi District
Bunyole East	Butaleja District
Bunyole West	Butaleja District
Burahya	Kabarole District
Buruli	Masindi District
Bushenyi-Ishaka Municipality	Bushenyi District
Busia Municipality	Busia District
Busiki	Namutumba District
Busiki North	Namutumba District
Busiro East	Wakiso District
Busiro North	Wakiso District
Busiro South	Wakiso District
Busongora North	Kasese District
Busongora South	Kasese District
Busujju	Mityana District
Butambala	Butambala District
Butebo	Butebo District
Butemba	Kyankwanzi District
Butembe	Jinja District
Butiru	Manafwa District
Buvuma	Buvuma District
Buwekula	Mubende District
Buwekula South	Mubende District
Buyaga East	Kagadi District
Buyaga West	Kagadi District
Buyamba	Rakai District
Buyanja	Kibaale District
Buyanja East	Kibaale District
Buzaaya	Kamuli District
Bwamba	Bundibugyo District
Chekwii	Nakapiripirit District
Chekwii East	Nakapiripirit District
Chua East	Kitgum District
Chua West	Kitgum District
Dakabela	Soroti District
Dodoth East	Kaabong District
Dodoth North	Kaabong District
Dodoth West	Karenga District
Dokolo North	Dokolo District
Dokolo South	Dokolo District
Elgon	Bulambuli District
Elgon North	Bulambuli District
Entebbe Municipality	Wakiso District
Erute North	Lira District
Erute South	Lira District
Fort Portal Central Division	Fort Portal City
Fort Portal North Division	Fort Portal City
Gogonyo	Pallisa District
Gomba East	Gomba District
Gomba West	Gomba District
Gulu East	Gulu City
Gulu West	Gulu City
Gweri	Soroti District
Hoima East Division	Hoima City
Hoima West Division	Hoima City
Ibanda Municipality	Ibanda District
Ibanda North	Ibanda District
Ibanda South	Ibanda District
Iganga Municipality	Iganga District
Igara East	Bushenyi District
Igara West	Bushenyi District
Ik	Kaabong District
Iki-Iki	Budaka District
Isingiro North	Isingiro District
Isingiro South	Isingiro District
Isingiro West	Isingiro District
Jie	Kotido District
Jinja North Division	Jinja City
Jinja South East Division	Jinja City
Jinja South West Division	Jinja City
Jonam	Pakwach District
Kabale Municipality	Kabale District
Kaberamaido	Kaberamaido District
Kabula	Lyantonde District
Kabweri	Kibuku District
Kachumbala	Bukedea District
Kagoma North	Jinja District
Kagoma South	Jinja District
Kajara	Ntungamo District
Kakuuto	Kyotera District
Kalaki	Kalaki District
Kalungu East	Kalungu District
Kalungu West	Kalungu District
Kampala Central Division	Kampala District
Kamuli Municipality	Kamuli District
Kanyum	Kumi District
Kapchorwa Municipality	Kapchorwa District
Kapelebyong	Kapelebyong District
Kapir	Ngora District
Kasambya	Mubende District
Kasese Municipality	Kasese District
Kashari North	Mbarara District
Kashari South	Mbarara District
Kashongi	Kiruhura District
Kasilo	Serere District
Kassanda North	Kassanda District
Kassanda South	Kassanda District
Katerera	Rubirizi District
Katikamu North	Luwero District
Katikamu South	Luwero District
Kawempe North	Kampala District
Kawempe South	Kampala District
Kazo	Kazo District
Kibale	Kamwenge District
Kibale	Pallisa District
Kibale East	Kamwenge District
Kibanda North	Kiryandongo District
Kibanda South	Kiryandongo District
Kiboga East	Kiboga District
Kiboga West	Kiboga District
Kibuku	Kibuku District
Kigorobya	Hoima District
Kigulu North	Iganga District
Kigulu South	Iganga District
Kilak North	Amuru District
Kilak South	Amuru District
Kimanya-Kabonera	Masaka City
Kinkinzi West	Kanungu District
Kinkizi East	Kanungu District
Kioga	Amolatar District
Kioga North	Amolatar District
Kira Municipality	Wakiso District
Kisoro Municipality	Kisoro District
Kitagwenda	Kitagwenda District
Kitgum Municipality	Kitgum District
Koboko	Koboko District
Koboko Municipality	Koboko District
Koboko North	Koboko District
Kole North	Kole District
Kole South	Kole District
Kongasis	Bukwo District
Kooki	Rakai District
Kotido Municipality	Kotido District
Kumi	Kumi District
Kumi Municipality	Kumi District
Kwania	Kwania District
Kwania North	Kwania District
Kween	Kween District
Kyadondo East	Wakiso District
Kyaka Central	Kyegegwa District
Kyaka North	Kyegegwa District
Kyaka South	Kyegegwa District
Kyamuswa	Kalangala District
Kyotera	Kyotera District
Labwor	Abim District
Lamwo	Lamwo District
Lira City East	Lira City
Lira City West	Lira City
Lower Madi	Madi-Okollo District
Lubaga North	Kampala District
Lubaga South	Kampala District
Lugazi Municipality	Buikwe District
Lutsheshe	Bududa District
Luuka North	Luuka District
Luuka South	Luuka District
Lwemiyaga	Sembabule District
Makindye East	Kampala District
Makindye Ssabagabo Municipality	Wakiso District
Makindye West	Kampala District
Manjiya	Bududa District
Maracha	Maracha District
Maracha East	Maracha District
Maruzi	Apac District
Maruzi North	Apac District
Masindi Municipality	Masindi District
Matheniko	Moroto District
Mawogola North	Sembabule District
Mawogola South	Sembabule District
Mawogola West	Sembabule District
Mawokota North	Mpigi District
Mawokota South	Mpigi District
Mbale Industrial Division	Mbale City
Mbale Northern Division	Mbale City
Mbarara City North	Mbarara City
Mbarara City South	Mbarara City
Mityana Municipality	Mityana District
Mityana North	Mityana District
Mityana South	Mityana District
Moroto	Alebtong District
Moroto Municipality	Moroto District
Moyo West	Moyo District
Mubende Municipality	Mubende District
Mukono Municipality	Mukono District
Mukono North	Mukono District
Mukono South	Mukono District
Mwenge Central	Kyenjojo District
Mwenge North	Kyenjojo District
Mwenge South	Kyenjojo District
Nakaseke Central	Nakaseke District
Nakaseke North	Nakaseke District
Nakaseke South	Nakaseke District
Nakasongola	Nakasongola District
Nakawa East	Kampala District
Nakawa West	Kampala District
Nakifuma	Mukono District
Namayingo South	Namayingo District
Namisindwa	Namisindwa District
Nansana Municipality	Wakiso District
Napore West	Karenga District
Ndorwa East	Kabale District
Ndorwa West	Kabale District
Nebbi Municipality	Nebbi District
Ngariam	Katakwi District
Ngora	Ngora District
Njeru Municipality	Buikwe District
Ntenjeru North	Kayunga District
Ntenjeru South	Kayunga District
Ntoroko	Ntoroko District
Ntungamo Municipality	Ntungamo District
Ntwetwe	Kyankwanzi District
Nwoya	Nwoya District
Nwoya East	Nwoya District
Nyabushozi	Kiruhura District
Nyendo-Mukungwe	Masaka City
Obongi	Obongi District
Ochero	Kaberamaido District
Okoro	Zombo District
Omoro	Omoro District
Ora	Zombo District
Orungo	Amuria District
Otuke	Otuke District
Otuke East	Otuke District
Oyam North	Oyam District
Oyam South	Oyam District
Padyere	Nebbi District
Palabek	Lamwo District
Pallisa	Pallisa District
Pian	Nabilatuk District
Pingire	Serere District
Rubabo	Rukungiri District
Rubanda East	Rubanda District
Rubanda West	Rubanda District
Ruhama	Ntungamo District
Ruhama East	Ntungamo District
Ruhinda	Mitooma District
Ruhinda North	Mitooma District
Ruhinda South	Mitooma District
Rujumbura	Rukungiri District
Rukiga	Rukiga District
Rukungiri Municipality	Rukungiri District
Rushenyi County	Ntungamo District
Rwampara	Rwampara District
Rwampara East	Rwampara District
Samia Bugwe Central	Busia District
Samia Bugwe North	Busia District
Samia Bugwe South	Busia District
Serere	Serere District
Sheema Municipality	Sheema District
Sheema North	Sheema District
Sheema South	Sheema District
Soi	Kween District
Soroti	Soroti District
Soroti East	Soroti City
Soroti West	Soroti City
Tepeth	Moroto District
Terego East	Terego District
Terego West	Terego District
Tingei	Kapchorwa District
Too	Bukwo District
Torchi	Omoro District
Toroma	Katakwi District
Tororo County North	Tororo District
Tororo County South	Tororo District
Tororo Municipality	Tororo District
Upe	Amudat District
Upper Madi	Madi-Okollo District
Usuk	Katakwi District
Vurra	Arua District
West Budama Central	Tororo District
West Budama North	Tororo District
West Budama North East	Tororo District
West Budama South	Tororo District
