= Ngora Hospital =

Private non-profit community hospital in Uganda

- Church of Uganda
- Location within Uganda

Geography
- Location: Ngora, Ngora District, Eastern Region, Uganda
- Coordinates: 01°28′42″N 33°47′35″E

Organisation
- Care system: Community Hospital
- Type: General
- Affiliated university: UGANDA PROTESTANT MEDICAL BUREAU

Services
- Emergency department: I
- Beds: 180

History
- Founded: 1922

Links
- Website: www.ngorahospital.org
- Other links: Hospitals in Uganda

Ngora Freda Carr Hospital, commonly known as Ngora Hospital, is a community hospital in Uganda. It is affiliated with the Anglican Church of Uganda. It was founded in 1922. It has capacity of 180 beds.

== Location ==
The hospital is in the small town of Ngora, in Ngora District, Teso sub-region, in the Eastern Region of Uganda. It is located approximately 45 kilometres (28 mi), by road, southeast of Soroti Regional Referral Hospital, in the city of Soroti.

Ngora Hospital lies approximately 72 kilometres (45 mi), by road, northwest of Mbale Regional Referral Hospital, in the city of Mbale. The coordinates of Ngora Freda Carr Hospital are 01°28'42.0"N, 33°47'35.0"E (Latitude:01.478333; Longitude:33.793056

== Overview ==
The hospital was founded in 1922 by the Anglican Church. At that time, the hospital was under the auspices of the Soroti Diocese. As of 2014, the hospital is under the Kumi Diocese of the Church of Uganda. It is a rural, non-profit, community hospital, with a bed capacity of 180. It takes care of both outpatients and inpatients. It is the largest hospital in Ngora District, and its maternity unit serves as the District Maternity Unit, which provides general maternity services. It also offers specialized dental, gynecological, and mental health services.

Ngora Hospital is administered by a board of governors and is an affiliate of the Uganda Protestant Medical Board. It also has close collaboration with the Uganda Ministry of Health and the Ngora District Administration. The hospital serves a rural population estimated at over 157,400 in Ngora District. It also handles patients from the neighboring districts of Amuria, Bukedea, Katakwi, Kumi, Pallisa, and Soroti.

== See also ==
- Hospitals in Uganda
