= Islam in Uganda =

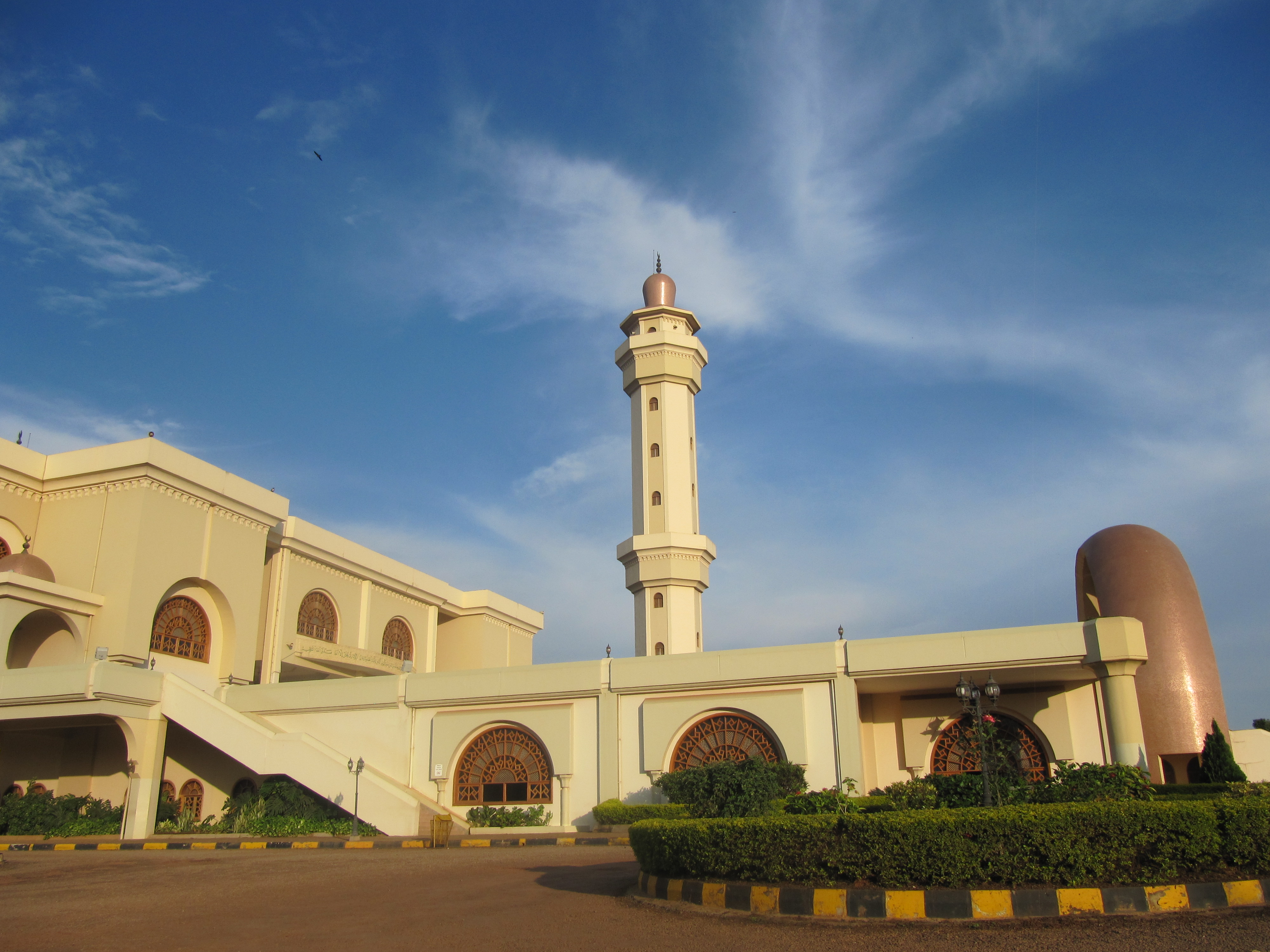
The Uganda National Mosque is one of the largest mosques in Sub-Saharan Africa.

Islam in Uganda is the second largest religion in the country behind Christianity. Islam is practised by around 14% of the population. However claims by Islamic groups suggest that Islam in Uganda stands at a potentially higher percentage of up to 35%. The Pew Research Center in 2014, however, estimated that 11.5 percent of Ugandans were Muslim. The vast majority of Muslims in Uganda are Sunni. Small Shia and Ahmadi minorities are also present.

The Iganga District in the east of Uganda had the highest percentage of Muslims according to a 2009 published report.

== History ==
The presence of Islam in Southern Uganda was first recorded in the 1840s during the reign of Suuna II, the ruler of the Kingdom of Buganda in central Uganda. Muslim traders from the Swahili coast came to Buganda via Karagwe. One of the first of these was Ahmad bin Ibrahim, who was known particularly for his proselytizing, an unusual trait not often mentioned in accounts about traders. According to European sources, his efforts at converting local Baganda to Islam were a result of his "Wahhabist" sympathies. Ahmad was treated as a friend and protege of Suuna and he held discussions with the kabaka about the Quran, Muslim law, and theology. Suuna is said to have memorised several chapters of the Quran by heart and after his death manuscript pages from the Quran were discovered in his house. Despite this, there is no evidence that Suuna ever seriously intended to adopt Islam. However, it is known that he encouraged Ahmad to extend the teaching of Islam to his subjects, as well as to neighboring Karagwe.

After Suuna's death he was succeeded by Kabaka Mutesa, who is said to have had an even more interest in Islam than his father. In the late 1850s or early 1860s, Mutesa was visited by Ali Nakatukula, who left a Swahili servant to teach Mutesa Arabic. The Kabaka excelled in this to such an extent that he was able to translate portions of the Quran into Luganda. Thereafter he began spreading Islam to his chiefs and subjects. A large mosque was built at his palace, and his pages were appointed as guardians of the mosque. Every Friday he and his chiefs would gather there to pray. He decreed that his chiefs and subjects should perform daily prayers and use Arabic or Swahili forms of greeting. He also introduced Muslim forms of attire at his court. In 1867 Mutesa fasted the month of Ramadan for the first time, maintaining this for the next 10 years. More strikingly, he made fasting obligatory for all his subjects. He even sent an unsuccessful mission to the neighboring kingdom of Bunyoro in the hopes of convincing Kabarega to adopt Islam.

Thus, whereas under Suuna the spread of Islam had been confined mainly to the court and its immediate surroundings, under Mutesa the influence of Islam began to spread into the countryside and Muslims became commanders and heads of provinces. Indeed, during these years, Islam became a kind of "state" religion.

In 1875 the situation changed as Henry Morton Stanley visited the kabaka's court, then two years later the first Christian missionaries arrived, changing Mutesa's perception of Islam marking a turning point in the history of Islam in Buganda. At the same time, the Kabaka was feeling threatened by the advance of the Khedivate southwards from Egyptian Equatoria. From 1877 to 1884, the year of Mutesa's death, the Muslim position in Buganda deteriorated, as the Christian missionaries succeeded in arousing doubts and weakening Mutesa's practice of the Muslim faith. Mutesa's interest in Islam continued, as did his open admiration of the culture of the sultans of Zanzibar, but his relations with Muslims came to be exercised within the context of contemporary political circumstances. Mutesa seems to have had an overriding interest in obtaining guns from whomever he could; Muslim, Protestant or Catholic.

After his death, Buganda entered into a period known as the "wars of religion," during which the forces of Islam, Protestantism, Catholicism and traditional religion vied for power. The Baganda who had adopted Islam under Mutesa occupied many important posts and they were able to set Prince Kalema who ruled as a Muslim kabaka (1888–89), but in 1890 the arrival in Buganda of agents of the Imperial British East Africa Company helped to turn the tide irreversibly against Islam.

However, one of the consequences of the loss of influence by Muslims in the court and government was the emigration of Baganda Muslims. They sought their fortunes elsewhere, going to neighboring areas, like Busoga, Toro, and Bunyoro, and a large group of Muslims from Buganda was also given refuge by the ruler of Ankole, helping to spread Islam wherever they went.

Meanwhile, Islam was also spread to northern Uganda via the expansion of the Khedivate of Egypt and the garrisoning of Muslim Sudanese troops under the command of Emin Pasha. Later they were employed by British colonial administrator Frederick Lugard when Egyptian control collapsed in the south. . These Sudanese soldiers imparted a permanent Muslim character to the towns they lived in. A legacy of this is Aringa County, the only part of East Africa where the Maliki school of law (madhhab) prevails. Baganda Muslims were also recruited by the British as administrative agents, interpreters, and chiefs in such places as Lango, Teso, and Bukedi, using their influence to spread Islam.

Despite persecution by the British, Islam flourished in the colonial period and was said to be fastest growing religion in Uganda by a colonial officer in the 1950s. Mosques were built in almost every established city in Uganda and the Uganda Muslim Education Association, founded by prince Badru Kakungulu with help by Asian Muslims, built hundreds of primary schools through introducing western educational curriculum into madrasah schools across the country.

== 2002 census ==
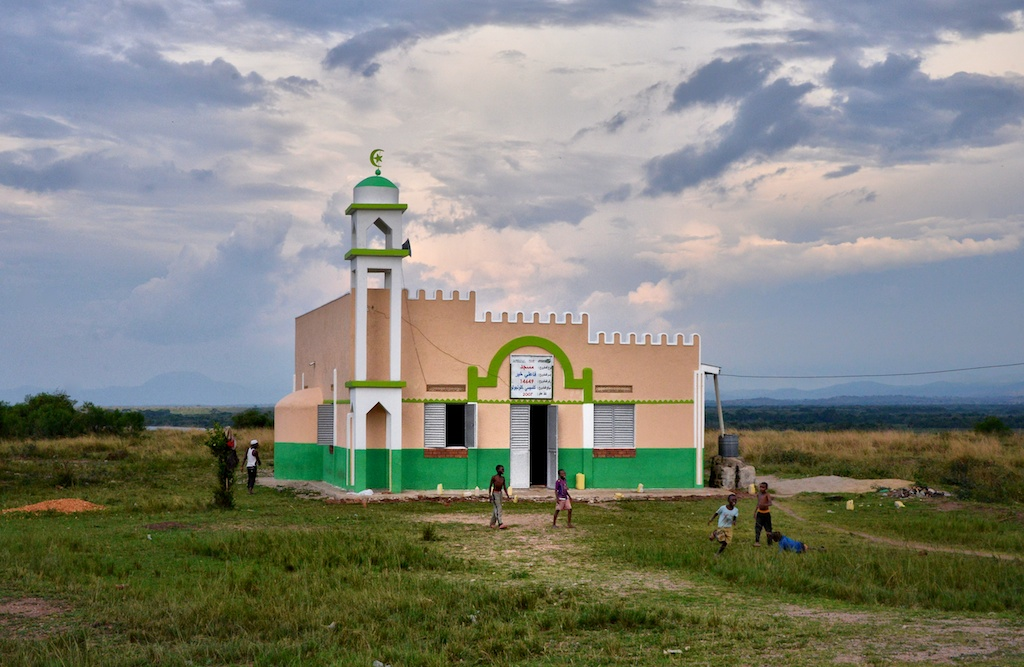
A rural mosque in Uganda

The 2002 national census recorded that Muslims represented 12.1 percent of the population.

Region	% Muslim
Central	18.4%
Eastern	17.0%
Northern	8.5%
Western	4.5%
Total	12.1%

=== Geographical distribution ===
Yumbe District is the only district with a Muslim-majority (76%). Muslims form a significant minority in the districts of Mayuge (36%) and Iganga (34%).

Region/District	Population (2014 census)	Number of Muslims	Share of Muslims
Kampala District	1,187,795	268,787	22.6%
Iganga District	708,630	239,582	33.8%
Yumbe District	251,758	191,913	76.2%
Mukono District	795,114	165,817	20.9%
Masaka District	770,379	164,950	21.4%
Wakiso District	907,736	164,256	18.1%
Mbale District	717,534	132,247	18.4%
Arua District	833,538	123,229	14.8%
Mayuge District	324,668	117,526	36.2%
Kamuli District	707,242	112,177	15.9%
Bugiri District	412,365	101,571	24.6%
Jinja District	387,249	100,257	25.9%
Pallisa District	520,532	94,231	18.1%
Luwero District	478,492	89,232	18.6%
Mpigi District	407,739	87,314	21.4%
Kayunga District	294,568	76,127	25.8%
Mubende District	689,305	74,781	10.8%
Tororo District	536,732	63,381	11.8%
Mbarara District	1,088,012	61,273	5.6%
Rakai District	470,144	51,348	10.9%
Moyo District	194,734	35,569	18.3%
Kasese District	522,726	33,790	6.5%
Masindi District	459,244	31,753	6.9%
Bushenyi District	731,217	31,293	4.3%
Sironko District	283,056	28,961	10.2%
Kiboga District	229,297	27,839	12.1%
Sembabule District	180,028	27,408	15.2%
Busia District	224,887	22,322	9.9%
Ntungamo District	379,829	20,688	5.1%
Bundibugyo District	209,820	18,601	8.9%
Nebbi District	435,252	17,829	4.1%
Kabarole District	356,704	17,696	5.0%
Hoima District	343,480	17,438	5.1%
Kapchorwa District	190,282	16,324	8.6%
Kibaale District	405,761	13,044	3.2%
Kyenjojo District	377,109	11,754	3.1%
Kumi District	389,599	11,632	3.0%
Adjumani District	202,223	11,273	5.6%
Kamwenge District	263,595	10,865	4.1%
Lira District	740,893	9,566	1.3%
Nakasongola District	127,048	9,428	7.4%
Soroti District	369,621	8,541	2.3%
Kanungu District	204,640	5,564	2.7%
Rukungiri District	275,101	5,339	1.9%
Kalangala District	34,699	4,986	14.4%
Gulu District	475,071	4,597	1.0%
Apac District	683,987	3,999	0.6%
Kabale District	458,107	3,753	0.8%
Katakwi District	298,900	3,131	1.0%
Kotido District	591,870	2,313	0.4%
Moroto District	189,907	1,707	0.9%
Kisoro District	220,202	1,693	0.8%
Kitgum District	282,270	1,617	0.6%
Pader District	326,320	1,463	0.4%
Nakapiripirit District	154,494	1,390	0.9%
Kaberamaido District	131,627	956	0.7%
Uganda (total)	24,433,132	2,956,121	12.1%

== See also ==
- Religion in Uganda
- Islam in Africa
- Islam by country

== Bibliography ==
- Kasozi, Abdu B.K. (January 1985). "The Uganda Muslim supreme council: an experiment in Muslim administrative centralisation and institutionalisation, 1972–82". Institute of Muslim Minority Affairs Journal. 6 (1): 34–52. doi:10.1080/13602008508715923.
