= Teso people =

Nilotic ethnic group native to eastern Uganda and western Kenya

Iteso
- Flag

Total population
- 2,782,239

Regions with significant populations
- Uganda: 2,364,569
- Kenya: 417,670

Languages
- Teso language, Swahili language, and English language

Religion
- Christianity, Traditional faith

Related ethnic groups
- other Ateker peoples and other Nilotic peoples

Teso
- Person: Etesot (m)/Atesot (f)
- People: Iteso
- Language: Ateso
- Country: Teso

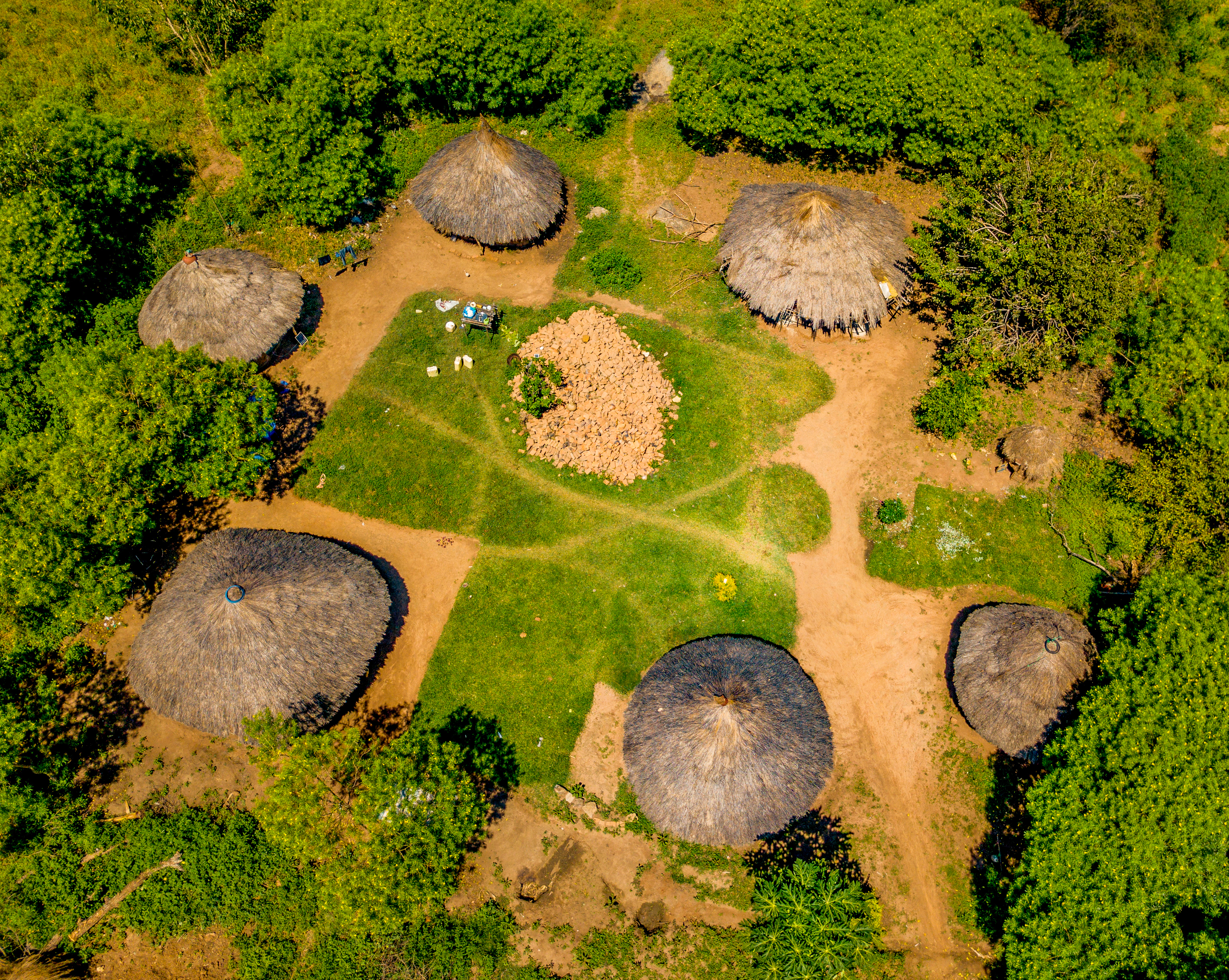
Iteso Homestead

The Iteso (or people of Teso) are a Nilotic ethnic group in eastern Uganda and western Kenya. Teso refers to the traditional homeland of the Iteso, and Ateso is their language.

== History ==
=== Migration ===
It is believed there were two waves of migration. The first migration brought them to present day northeastern Uganda and western Kenya and was largely gradual and peaceful. The legendary hero Oduk and his wife Among'in supposedly helped the Iteso in this second migration to modern day Busia County circa 1500 AD, and by the 19th century, they controlled a vast swathe of territory. Their aggressive expansion drew them into conflicts with other already present ethnic groups. Oduk is credited with militarily organizing the Iteso and helping them defeat their rivals. However, their gains were reversed as neighboring ethnic groups allied with the British defeated them. Much of traditional Iteso culture and organization was lost when they were conquered by the Ganda people in the 19th century; the language of the northern Ateso is markedly influenced by Luganda due to this conquest. In contrast, southern Ateso has been influenced by the Turkana language.

=== British colonialism and independence ===
During the 20th century, the Iteso people underwent drastic changes in their lifestyles, transitioning from a pastoral lifestyle to prolific farmers. Many Iteso men travelled abroad to work in overseas British territories, such as Burma. In 1902, part of eastern Uganda was transferred to western Kenya, splitting the Iteso; despite this division, there's little cultural difference between the two. However, the two's economic and social paths have diverged greatly. At independence, Ugandan Iteso were wealthier, as they did not suffer from the economic marginalization Kenyan Africans did due to white settlers. However, the Kenyan Iteso did not suffer the same degree of political instability their Ugandan cousins have, and Kenya's more developed economic infrastructure allowed for Kenyan Iteso to overtake Ugandan Iteso in wealth.

During Milton Obote's first period of rule, many Iteso received army and administration posts, allowing them to gain relative prosperity, which they invested back into cattle herds. After Idi Amin was overthrown in 1979, the Karamojong acquired large amounts of arms, which they used to raid cattle from largely unarmed Iteso civilians; Iteso cattle herds were decimated, and many fell into poverty. During Obote's second period of rule, the Ugandan army was composed largely of the Iteso and Acholi. When Yoweri Museveni came to power, he disbanded a military unit meant to stop the Karamojong's cattle rustling and dismissed many Iteso, Acholi, and Kumam soldiers from the army for their previous service under Obote. These disgruntled soldiers, upon returning to their economically deprived homelands due to violent cattle raids, took up arms against the Museveni regime. The Teso insurgency lasted into the late 1980s, keeping the region undeveloped.

In 1992, the conflict was brought to an end through the combined effort of the local initiatives, indigenous mediators, churches, and the Presidential Commission for Teso (PCT). This led to the creation of a war memorial near the Iteso capital Soroti, and the installation of an Iteso king, Emorimor Papa Paphrus Imodot Edimu. While successful in ending the violence and mollifying Teso opposition to Museveni, the Teso sub-region remains one of the poorest regions in Uganda, and the Iteso feel politically and economically neglected, widely distrusting the Museveni administration.

== Distribution ==
=== Uganda ===
In Uganda, the Iteso live mainly in Teso sub-region, i.e., the districts of Amuria, Bukedea, Butebo, Kaberamaido, Kapelebyong, Katakwi, Kumi, Ngora, Serere and Soroti, but are also found in Bugiri and Pallisa, as well as in the Tororo and Busia districts.

According to the 2014 Ugandan Bureau of Statistics report, the Iteso number about 2.36 million (7.0% of Uganda's population). Until 1980, they were the second largest ethnic group in Uganda; this share of the population likely decreased due to Teso fleeing from political instability and violence. Some Iteso contend that they are still the second largest ethnic group in Uganda, and this figure has supposedly been deflated to restrict the political power of the Iteso, as the national budget is distributed based on population.

=== Kenya ===
There are around 670,000 Iteso in Kenya, living mainly in Busia County, south of Mt. Elgon. They primarily inhabit two sub-counties, Teso North and Teso South, but can be found in Bugoma and Trans Nzoia County.

== Economic activities ==
=== Farming ===
The Iteso are noted for their quick adoption of the ox plow in the early 1900s. Women farmed and foraged while men herded their cattle.

Cotton is the primary cash crop among the Iteso. It's grown by both men and women in separate plots during the short rains. Another cash crop grown is tobacco. In the 1980s, Kenyan government-sponsored cooperative-ran cotton ginneries failed to pay for the cotton delivered by the Iteso and others. The Iteso then began experimenting with other cash crops like tobacco with the aid of loans from large agricultural companies. However, since the 1990s, the cotton industry has been partially revived.

=== Herding ===
Herding used to be the primary economic activity among the Iteso, particularly men. Cattle play a large social role among the Iteso, as they play a key role in negotiating bride-price and other important social events. When a father gives a son his own cattle, it signals the maturation of the son, able to manage his own estate and start his own family.

== Culture ==
=== Cuisine ===
The staple food for the Iteso is finger millet (akima) and sorghum (imomwa). During colonization, cassava was introduced by colonial authorities as a dietary supplement. They also consume pumpkins, wild berries, peas, groundnuts, and beans. Domestic and wild animal meat was consumed, alongside milk, butter, and fish.

The cultural drink of the Iteso people is ajon, a fermented brew made from dried finger millet (usually the emiroiti variety) that is commonly consumed in local ceremonies, social gatherings and important events. It can be consumed in a calabash, or a communal pot where participants sip the drink from long tubes. It is custom to keep a mother whose recently given birth confined to the home for three days, and afterwards, ajon is placed in the mouth of the infant. Some Christian Iteso criticize the customs surrounding ajon. In the modern age, the production of ajon has become commercialized, and its production and sale are an important source of income for the families that specialize in making it.

Traditionally, Teso people loved singing and dancing educative folksongs in different occasions. These songs include Ataikatiaka Kitiso, about the unity of the Teso people, Akidai Imojong, a song to respect and care for elders, and Iyalama Imojong to appreciate elders among others. iteso people also have their cultural event mainly at kakapel mountain on 26 December every year this is where the cultural practises are done

=== Afterlife ===
According to oral tradition, the legendary Oduk was responsible for the Iteso practice of exhuming bodies from bushes after a number of years. The Iteso traditional religion holds that upon death, the body is separated from its spirit (eparait), which leaves to live in the bush. Ideally, the spirit will move further and further into the bush, but discontent spirits may return to bother the living, demanding offerings of food and drink. Exhuming the bodies after a few years is meant to 'cool' them, and make them more amenable to the living. Many Iteso are reluctant or even afraid to be buried in coffins, believing they cannot be 'cooled', and thereby suffocating the dead.

Due to missionary influence, spirits of the dead have come to be associated with ajokin, small creatures of the bush, and both have come to be associated with the devil.

=== Religion ===
Prior to European missionary efforts, the Iteso believed in an omnipotent god called Akuj, and a God of calamity called Edeke. The iteso followed the scripts and religious scribes that were gifted to Queen of Sheebah in Ethiopia by king Solomon.

=== Sexuality ===
Among the Iteso, men who felt like women could become women by modifying their voices, manners of walking, and speech.

Group masturbation has been reportedly practiced among Iteso men.

== Notable people ==
- Jessica Alupo, Current Vice President of the Republic of Uganda
- Anita Annet Among, Current Speaker of Parliament of Uganda
- Jeje Odongo, Current Minister of Foreign Affairs
- Christine Apolot, Ugandan politician
- Sospeter Ojaamong, Kenyan politician
- John Bosco Ikojo, Ugandan politician
- Kevin Ojinga Kaala, Ugandan politician
- Mike Mukula, Ugandan politician
- Musa Francis Ecweru, State Minister for Works and transport in the Ugandan Cabinet
- Enoch Olinga, Prominent member of the Baha'i Faith, Knight of Baháʼu'lláh and was appointed as the youngest Hand of the Cause
- Olubayi Olubayi, Professor and visionary
- Patricia Apolot, Ugandan female professional martial artist
- Proscovia Alengot Oromait, Ugandan politician. At age 19, she was the youngest Member of Parliament in Uganda and in Africa.
- Silas Aogon, Ugandan politician
- Shaban Opolot, Ugandan military officer
- Ferdinand Omurwa, Kenyan sprinter
- Peter Elwelu (Major General), Current Ugandan Deputy Chief of Defence Forces.
