= Musa Ecweru =

Ugandan politician (born 1964)

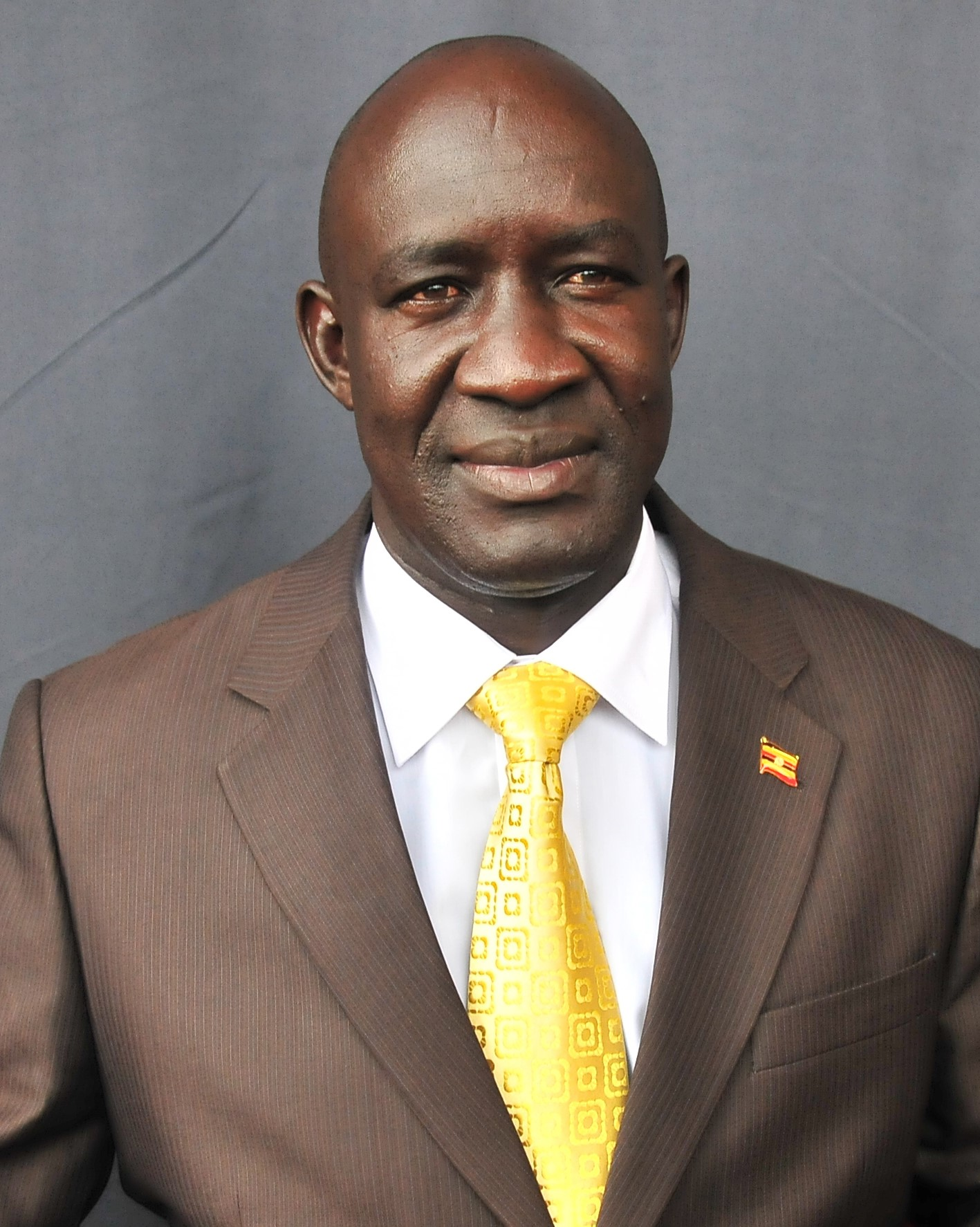
- Born: 25 November 1964 (age 61); Uganda
- Citizenship: Uganda
- Education: Uganda Martyrs University (BA); Nkumba University (Dip.Acct.); Uganda Management Institute (Cert.Hmn.Res.Mgnt.)
- Occupations: Accountant & Politician
- Years active: 1986–present
- Known for: Politics

Musa Francis Ecweru (born 25 November 1964) is an accountant and politician in Uganda. He served as a state minister for works in the Ministry of Works and Transport in the Ugandan Cabinet (2021–2026). Before that, he served as the State Minister for Relief and Disaster Preparedness from 1^{st} June 2006 to 16th February 2009, in the cabinet reshuffles made in 2009. He was again reappointed to the same ministerial position on 27 May 2011 and in 2016. He also served as the elected Member of Parliament representing Amuria County, in Amuria District, from 2006 until 2026.

== Early life and education ==
Musa Ecweru was born in Amuria District, Eastern Uganda, on 25 November 1964. He is the third born of the ten children of William Ecweru. From 1971, Musa attended Angole/Wera Primary School, graduating in 1979. In 1980, he entered Teso College Aloet for his secondary education. After his secondary education, he joined Bukalasa Agricultural College to study about cooperatives, but he could not complete his studies due to the insurgency that erupted at Luwero Triangle. He then moved on to stay at the home of Colonel William Omaria Lo Arapai, a prominent Teso politician during the Milton Obote II regime. Colonel Omaria sent him to study accounting at Nkumba University, then known as Nkumba College. He graduated from that institution with the Diploma in Accounting. Later, he obtained the Certificate in Human Resources Management from the Uganda Management Institute in Kampala, Uganda's capital and largest city. Musa Ecweru also holds the degree of Bachelor of Arts in Democracy & Development Studies from Uganda Martyrs University in Nkozi, Mpigi District.

== Career ==
From 1986 until 1992, he worked as an Accounts Clerk at Aracil Concrete Products, a Ugandan business in Amuria. Between 1992 and 1993, he served as the Local Defence Commander (LDU), Teso sub-region. Between 1993 and 1994, he served as the Deputy Resident Commissioner (DRDC) in Soroti District. He was transferred to Lira District in 1994, as the Deputy Resident Commissioner, serving in that capacity until 1998.

In 1998 he was promoted to Resident District Commissioner (RDC) and transferred to Nebbi District, serving there until 2000. He was transferred to Gulu District as RDC in 2000, serving there until 2002. He also served as RDC for Kasese District from 2002 until 2004 and for Soroti District between 2004 and 2006. Since 2003, he has served as Chief of the Arrow Auxiliary Force, a volunteer force that protected civilians from the ravages of the Lords Resistance Army. In 2006, he successfully contested for the parliamentary seat of Amuria County in Amuria District. He was re-elected in March 2011, March 2016, and March 2021 as the MP for that constituency.

On 21 March 2023, following the vote for a bill that criminalizes people identifying as LGBT in Uganda, he addressed parliament stating, quote: “We are going to reinforce the law enforcement officers to make sure that homosexuals have no space in Uganda”.

During the elections that led up to the election of the 12th Ugandan Parliament (2026–2031), Musa Echweru withdrew from contesting re-election in his parliamentary seat. Later in 2026, he was dropped from the Uganda cabinet.

== Personal life ==
He is married. He belongs to the National Resistance Movement political party. He lists accounting as one of his occupations.

== See also ==
- Cabinet of Uganda
- Parliament of Uganda
- Amuria District
- Teso-sub-region
- Office of the Prime Minister(Uganda)
- Ministry of Works and Transport
- Refugees in Uganda
- Nkumba University
- Uganda Martyrs University
