= Serere =

Town in Uganda

Serere Serere Municipality
- Location in Uganda
- Coordinates: 01°30′00″N 33°33′00″E
- Country: Uganda
- Region: Eastern Uganda
- Sub-region: Teso sub-region
- District: Serere District
- Elevation: 1,085 m (3,560 ft)

Population (2010 Estimate)
  - Total: 12,700

Serere is a town in Eastern Uganda. It is the chief political, administrative and commercial town in Serere District, and the district headquarters are located there. The district is named after the town.

== Location ==
Serere lies in Serere District, Teso sub-region, in Uganda's Eastern Region. The town is located approximately 35 kilometres (22 mi) south of Soroti, the largest town in the sub-region. This location lies approximately 117 kilometres (73 mi), by road, northwest of Mbale, the nearest large city. The coordinates of Serere are:1°30'00.0"N, 33°33'00.0"E (Latitude:1.5000; Longitude:33.5500).

== Population ==
As of May 2014, it is estimated that within a radius of 7 kilometres (4.3 mi), from the town center, the population is about 12,700.

== Points of interest ==
The following points of interest are in Serere:

- The headquarters of Serere District Administration
- The offices of Serere Town Council
- Serere Central Market
- Serere Agricultural Research Station - An agricultural research institute administered by the Uganda Ministry of Agriculture
- Serere Township Secondary School

== See also ==
- Serere District
- Teso sub-region
- Eastern Region, Uganda
