= Kaberamaido =

- Location in Uganda
- Coordinates: 01°46′00″N 33°09′08″E
- Country: Uganda
- Region: Eastern Uganda
- Sub-region: Teso sub-region
- District: Kaberamaido District
- Elevation: 3,540 ft (1,080 m)

Population (2011 Estimate)
  - Total: 3,400

Kaberamaido is a town in Eastern Uganda, serving as the main municipal, administrative and commercial center of Kaberamaido District. It is also home to the district headquarters.

== Location ==
Kaberamaido is located approximately 163 kilometres (101 mi) by road, northwest of Mbale, the largest city in Eastern Uganda. This location lies approximately 64 kilometres (40 mi), by road, west of Soroti, the largest town in the sub-region. The coordinates of the town are: Latitude: 1.766667 (1° 46' 00.0"N); Longitude: 33.152221 (33° 09' 08.0"E).

== Population ==
In 2002, the national population census estimated the town's population at about 2,350. In 2010, the Uganda Bureau of Statistics (UBOS), estimated the population of the town at about 3,200. In 2011, UBOS estimated the mid-year population of Kaberamaido at 3,400.

== Points of interest ==
The following points of interest lie within the town limits or near the edges of town:

- The headquarters of Kaberamaido District Administration
- The offices of Kaberamaido Town Council
- Kaberamaido Central Market.

== See also ==
- Kaberamaido District
- Teso
- Eastern Uganda
- List of cities and towns in Uganda
