= Ngora District =

- District
- District location in Uganda
- Coordinates: 01°30′N 33°48′E
- Country: Uganda
- Region: Eastern Region of Uganda
- Sub-region: Teso sub-region
- Established: 1 July 2010
- Capital: Ngora

Area
  - Land: 721.4 km^{2} (278.5 sq mi)
- Elevation: 1,100 m (3,600 ft)

Population (2012 Estimate)
  - Total: 157,400
  - Density: 218.2/km^{2} (565/sq mi)
- Time zone: UTC+3 (EAT)
- Website: www.ngora.go.ug

Ngora District is a district in the Eastern Region of Uganda. The town of Ngora is the site of the district headquarters.

== Geography ==
Ngora District is located at 01°30′N 33°48′E. It is bordered by Soroti District to the northwest, Katakwi District to the northeast, Kumi District to the east, Pallisa District to the south, and Serere District to the west. The district headquarters are located approximately 23 kilometres (14 mi) west of Kumi, the nearest large town. It lies approximately 230 kilometres (140 mi), by road, northeast of Kampala, the capital of Uganda.

Ngora District is located in the Kyoga Water Management Zone, which covers Lake Kyoga and its drainage basin. Lake Adais, Lake Agu, Lake Bisina, Lake Nyaguo, and Lake Nyasala all lie partially within the district.

== Overview ==
Ngora District was established on 1 July 2010 by the Ugandan parliament. It was previously part of the Kumi District. Ngora District together with Amuria District, Bukedea District, Kaberamaido District, Katakwi District, Kumi District, Serere District, and Soroti District comprise the Teso sub-region, home to an estimated 2.5 million people of Iteso and Kumam ethnicities. Josephine Pedun is the parliamentary Woman representative for Ngora District. Ngora County is the only county in Ngora District represented by Abala David at parliament.

== Population ==
The 1991 national census estimated the district population at 59,400. The 2002 national census estimated the population at 101,900. The annual population growth rate in the district has been calculated at 4.5 percent. It has been estimated that the population of Ngora District in 2012 was 157,400.

== Economic activity ==
- Grain milling
- Crop production
- Carpentry
- Construction
- Bookshop business

== Livestock ==
- Cattle
- Chicken
- Pig
- Goat

== See also ==
- Ngora Hospital
- Districts of Uganda
- Parliament of Uganda
