= Serere District =

- District
- District location in Uganda
- Coordinates: 01°30′N 33°33′E
- Country: Uganda
- Region: Eastern Uganda
- Sub-region: Teso sub-region
- Capital: Serere

Area
  - Land: 1,965.4 km^{2} (758.8 sq mi)

Population (2012 Estimate)
  - Total: 294,100
  - Density: 149.6/km^{2} (387/sq mi)
- Time zone: UTC+3 (EAT)
- Website: serere.go.ug

Serere District is a district in Eastern Uganda. It is named after its 'chief town', Serere, which serves as the district headquarters.

== Location ==
Serere District is bordered by Soroti District to the north, Ngora District to the east, Pallisa District, Kaliro District and Buyende District to the south. Kaberamaido District lies to the west of Serere District. The district headquarters at Serere are located approximately 35 kilometres (22 mi) south of Soroti, the largest town in the sub-region. This location is approximately 205 kilometres (127 mi), by road, northeast of Kampala, the capital of Uganda and the largest city in that country. The coordinates of the district are: 01 30N, 33 33E.

== Overview ==
Serere District was created by an Act of Parliament and became functional effective 1 July 2010. It was previously part of Soroti District. Serere District is part of the Teso sub-region, home to an estimated 2.5 million people of Iteso and Kumam ethnicities. The districts that constitute the sub-region are: 1. Amuria District 2. Bukedea District 3. Kaberamaido District 4. Katakwi District 5. Kumi District 6. Ngora District 7. Serere District and 8. Soroti District. The sub-region is home to an estimated 2.5 million people of Iteso and Kumam ethnicities.

== Population ==
In 1991, the national population census estimated the district population at about 90,400. The national census in 2002 estimated the population at about 176,500 (51% women), with an overwhelmingly rural population (80%), and a very high proportion of children (56%, or 46.5% if you consider only under 5-year-old children). In 2012, the population of Serere District was estimated at 294,100. The major ethnicities in the district are: Iteso, Kumam and Bukenye, Bantu peoples.

== Economic activity ==
- Fishing
- Maize
- Beans
- Rice

== Livestock ==
- Cattle
- Goat
- Chicken
- Durk

== See also ==
- Serere
- Soroti District
- Teso sub-region
- Districts of Uganda
