= Buyende =

- Location in Uganda
- Coordinates: 01°08′51″N 33°09′40″E
- Country: Uganda
- Region: Eastern. Region of Uganda
- Sub-region: Busoga sub-region
- District: Buyende District
- Elevation: 3,480 ft (1,060 m)

Population (2024 Census)
  - Total: 33,843

Buyende is a town in the Eastern Region of Uganda. It is the main municipal, administrative, and commercial centre of Buyende District.

== Location ==
Buyende is approximately 89 kilometres (55 mi) north of Jinja, the largest city in the Busoga sub-region. This is approximately 141 kilometres (88 mi), by road, west of Mbale, the largest city in Uganda's Eastern Region.

Buyende is located approximately 169 kilometres (105 mi), north-east of Kampala, the capital of Uganda and its largest city. The coordinates of the town are:1°08'51.0"N, 33°09'40.0"E (Latitude:1.147500; Longitude:33.161111).

== Population ==
In 2014, the national population census put the population of Buyende town at 23,039

== Points of interest ==
The following points of interest lie within the town limits or close to the edges of the town:

- headquarters of Buyende District Administration
- offices of Buyende Town Council
- Buyende central market.

== Challenges ==
Buyende Town attained municipality status when its home district (Buyende District), split from Kamuli District, on 1 July 2010. The town's main challenges include the following:

1. Lack of piped potable water. Buyende depends on communal boreholes for its water needs.

2. The absence of a sewerage system. There are no public toilet facilities in the town for residents and their visitors.

3. The town does not have a centralized garbage disposal system. Trash was observed to be strewed across public spaces in 2013.

4. Inadequate distribution of grid network electricity, with 80 percent of the residents dependent on kerosene lamps for lighting.

5. Domestic animals, including cattle, goats, sheep, and chicken roam freely in town without any restriction.

== See also ==
- Busoga
- Basoga
- List of cities and towns in Uganda
