= Silas Aogon =

Ugandan politician

Member of Parliament
- Incumbent
- Assumed office 2016
- Constituency: Kumi Municipality, Kumi District

Personal details
- Born: November 17, 1976 (age 49) Uganda
- Party: Independent
- Spouse: Married
- Education: Kumi Primary School (PLE); Wiggins Secondary School (UCE); Elgon High School - Mbale (UACE); Makerere University Business School (Diploma in Stores Management); Institute of Certified Public Accountants of Uganda (ICPAU) (Certified Public Accountant)
- Occupation: Accountant, Politician
- Profession: Accountant, Politician
- Committees: Public Accounts Committee; Committee on Natural Resources

Silas Aogon (born 17 November 1976) is a male Ugandan Accountant and Member of Parliament of Kumi Municipality, Kumi District. He has served in the tenth and eleventh Parliament of Uganda as an independent politician.

== Early life and education ==
Silas was born on 17 November 1976. In 1991, he completed his Primary Leaving Examination from Kumi Primary School and later joined Wiggins Secondary School in 1995 to pursue his Uganda Certificate of Education. He was awarded a Uganda Advanced Certificate of Education in 1998 from Elgon High School - Mbale. Silas holds a Diploma of Stores Management from Makerere University Business School (2000) and a Certified Public Accountant of Uganda from ICPAU (2013).

== Career before politics ==
Before joining the Parliament of Uganda as a Member of Parliament, Silas was employed as an Accounts Assistant (2006-2009), Stores Assistant (2006) and Senior Accounts Assistant (2009-2015) at Bukedea District Local Government. He also worked at Kumi District Local Government as the Stores Assistant in the year 2002 and 2006.

== Political career ==
He has been the Member of Parliament at the Parliament of Uganda from 2016 to date in the tenth and eleventh Parliament of Uganda.

He serves on the Professional body as an associate at ICPAU. He is the member of the Public Accounts Committee and Committee on Natural Resources. He is the UWOPA Associate Member.

He was among the 4 MPs from Teso Sub-region who vowed to go on strike if government failed to evenly distribute food. During the COVID-19 outbreak, he said that many Ugandans are facing economic hardships due to closure of businesses and urged the government to open the country so that people can trade.

== Personal life ==
He is married. His hobbies are watching football, travelling, playing pool and reading newspapers. He is interested in counselling and fundraising. Before joining politics, he used to be a master of ceremonies (MC) and events manager at various functions. He is a member of the Parliamentary Forum on Social Protection which specifically deals with issues of the elderly.

== See also ==
- List of members of the tenth Parliament of Uganda
- List of members of the eleventh Parliament of Uganda
- Parliament of Uganda
- Kumi District
- Member of Parliament
