= Kalaki District =

District in the Eastern Region of Uganda

- District
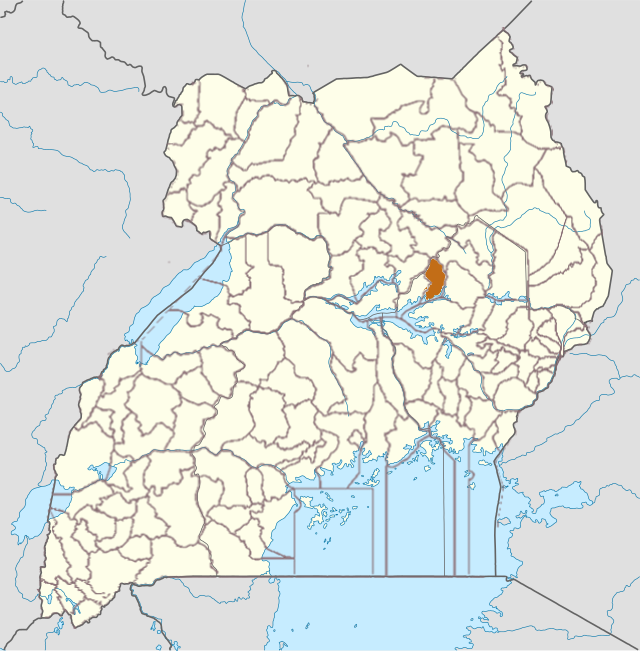
- District location in Uganda
- Country: Uganda
- Region: Eastern Uganda
- Established: 2019
- Headquarters: Kalaki

Area
  - Land: 737.1 km^{2} (284.6 sq mi)

Population (2024)
  - Total: 150,075
  - Density: 228/km^{2} (590/sq mi)
- Time zone: UTC+3 (EAT)
- Website: www.kalaki.go.ug

Kalaki is a district of Uganda located in the Eastern Region. It was formerly a county of the Kaberamaido District, before being made into its own county during July 2019. Its seat is the settlement of Kalaki.

== Location ==
Kalaki district borders the Kaberamaido, Dokolo, Alebtong, Amuria, and Soroti districts.

== History ==
Kalaki District was created in 2019 by an Act of Parliament, with operationalisation starting on 1 July 2019.

== Geography ==
Kalaki lies within the Teso sub-region. The wider Teso area is characterised by an undulating plateau with lakes, swamps and wetlands, bimodal rainfall supporting two cropping seasons, and vegetation described as grassland savannah with mainly sandy-loam soils.

== Administration ==
Kalaki District is administered through lower local governments, including sub-counties and town councils such as Anyara, Otuboi, Ochelakur, Kakure, Bululu, Apapai, Ogwolo, and Kalaki, as well as town councils like Otuboi Town Council and Kalaki Town Council (as referenced in government assessment documentation).

== Demographics ==
According to Uganda’s National Population and Housing Census 2024 preliminary results, Kalaki District had a population of 150,075 (73,405 male and 76,670 female). The district’s land area was reported as 658.0 km², giving a population density of 228 persons per km².

Census year	Population (total)	Male	Female	Land area (km²)	Density (persons/km²)
2024	150,075	73,405	76,670	658.0	228

== Economy ==
Livelihoods in the Teso sub-region are strongly linked to smallholder farming. Crops commonly grown in the sub-region include cassava, sweet potatoes, sorghum, finger millet, peas, maize groundnuts and rice. Livestock keeping (including cattle, goats, sheep and poultry) is also part of the local farming system.

== Public services ==
=== Health ===
District planning and budgeting documents reference service points such as Kalaki Health Centre IV (Kalaki HC IV).

== See also ==
- Counties of Uganda
- Eastern Region of Uganda
- Soroti District
- Teso sub-region
- Districts of Uganda
- Parliament of Uganda
