= Christine Apolot =

Ugandan politician

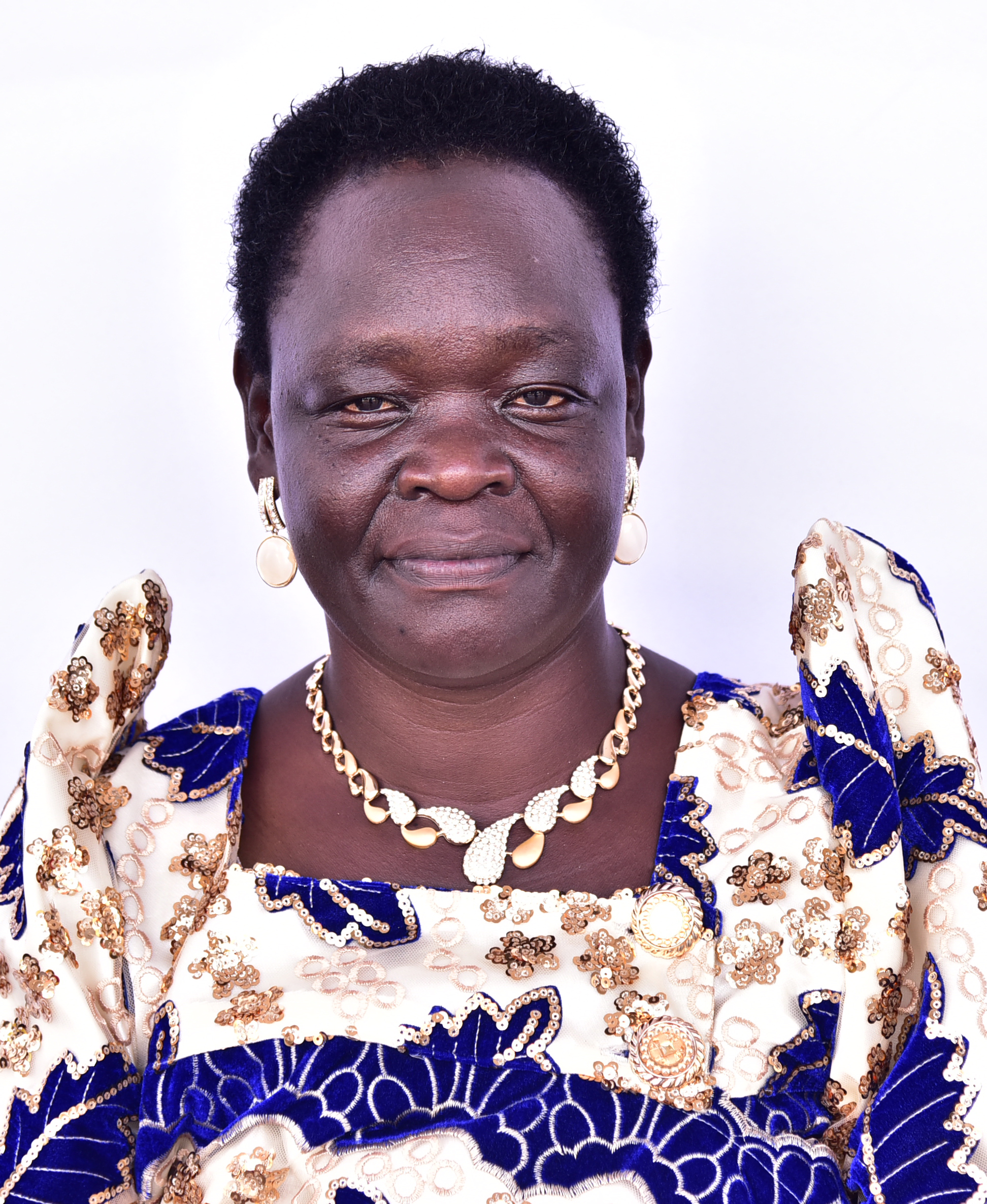
- Born: Kumi District
- Education: Kumi University (Degree in Education); Law Development Centre(LDC) (Certificate in Administrative law); Uganda Management Institute(UMI) (Public administration)
- Occupations: Teacher and politician
- Known for: politics
- Political party: National Resistance Movement

Christine Apolot is a Ugandan teacher and politician. She was the local counsel five(LC5) chair for Kumi District. She was elected to that position in June 2016. In 2021 she contested as the women's representative Member of Parliament for Kumi District under the National Resistance Movement party challenging Amoding Monicah.

== Early life and education ==
Apolot was born in Kumi District. She attained a first class degree in Education from Kumi University. She also has a Certificate in Administrative law from the Law Development Centre(LDC). As of March 2021, she was pursuing a post graduate diploma in Public administration at Uganda Management Institute(UMI).

== Career ==
Apolot started her career as a secondary school teacher, then she joined politics in 2016 under the National Resistance Movement(NRM) party as the Local Council 5 chairperson (LC5) in Kumi District. She became not only the first woman to occupy the seat in teso sub-region but one of the three women nationally to become LC5 chairpersons in Uganda. Currently she is the Women's Representative Member of Parliament elect for Kumi District in Uganda's 11th parliament.
