= Kevin Ojinga Kaala =

Ugandan politician

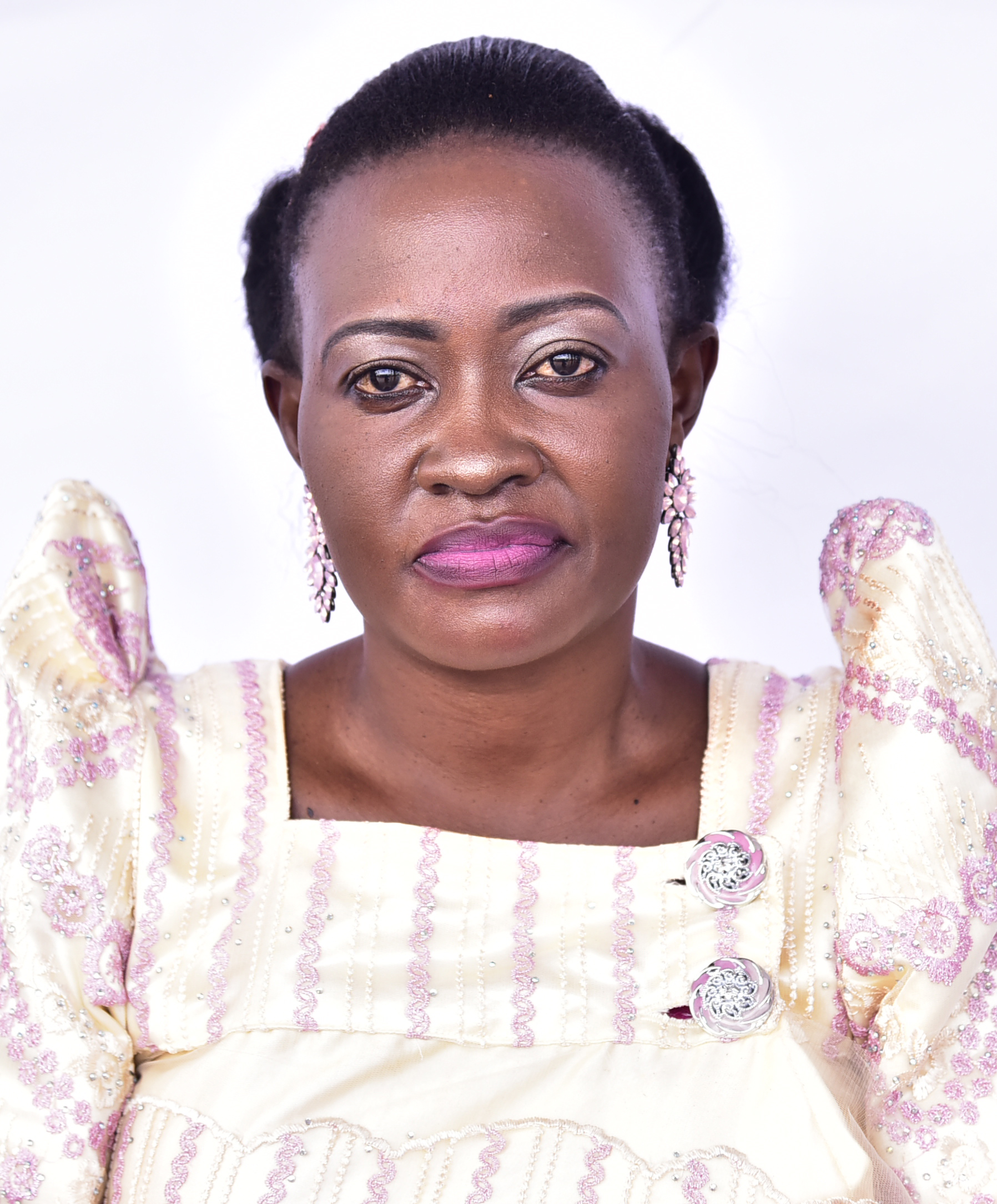

Member of Parliament
- Incumbent
- Assumed office 2021
- Constituency: Palisa District Woman Representative

Personal details
- Born: Uganda
- Party: National Resistance Movement (NRM)
- Occupation: Politician
- Committees: Committee on Gender, Labour and Social Development

Kevin Ojinga Kaala is a Ugandan politician and woman member of parliament. In 2021, she was elected as a woman representative in parliament for Palisa district during the 2021 Ugandan general election.

She is a member of the ruling National Resistance Movement political party.

In the eleventh parliament, she serves on the Committee on Gender, Labour and Social Development.

== See also ==
- List of members of the eleventh Parliament of Uganda
- Faith Alupo
- National Resistance Movement
- Paliisa District
- Member of Parliament
- Parliament of Uganda
