= Josephine Pedun =

Woman Member of Parliament for Ngora District
- In office May 2026 – 2031
- Majority: 17,010 votes

Personal details
- Born: Uganda
- Party: National Resistance Movement (NRM)
- Occupation: Politician
- Known for: Elected Woman MP for Ngora District (2026–2031); Member of the 12th Parliament of Uganda

Josephine Pedun is a Ugandan politician representing the people of Ngora District as an elected Woman Member of Parliament under the National Resistance Movement party for the term 2026–2031 with 17,010 votes as confirmed by Uganda Electoral Commission. She will serve as a legislature in the August House of Uganda from May 2026 – 2031.

== See also ==
- Parliament of Uganda
- Sarah Opendi
- Idah Nantaba
