= Kumam =

Kumam may refer to:

- Kumam people, a Nilotic ethnic group of Uganda
- Kumam dialect, the variety of Southern Luo spoken by those people
- Kumam Kingdom, the traditional monarchy of the Kumam people in Uganda
