= Buyende District =

- District
- District location in Uganda
- Coordinates: 1°14′N 33°09′E
- Country: Uganda
- Region: Eastern Uganda
- Sub-region: Busoga sub-region
- Capital: Buyende

Area
  - Land: 1,880.7 km^{2} (726.1 sq mi)

Population (2012 Estimate)
  - Total: 265,100
  - Density: 141/km^{2} (370/sq mi)
- Time zone: UTC+3 (EAT)
- Website: www.buyende.go.ug

Buyende District is a district in Eastern Uganda. It is named after Buyende, the 'chief town' in the district and the location of the district headquarters.

== Location ==
Buyende District is bordered by Amolatar District to the northwest, Kaberamaido District to the north, Serere District to the northeast, Kaliro District to the east, Luuka District to the southeast, Kamuli District to the south and Kayunga District to the west. The district headquarters at Buyende are located approximately 30 kilometres (19 mi), by road, north of Kamuli, the nearest large town. This location lies approximately 100 kilometres (62 mi), by road, north of Jinja, the largest city in the sub-region. The coordinates of the district are:01 11N, 33 10E.

== Overview ==
Buyende District was created by an Act of Parliament and became operational on 1 July 2010. Prior to that, it was part of Kamuli District. One of the reasons given for the creation of Buyende District, was the long distance that residents had to travel from the remote areas in the north of the district, to access services at Kamuli, then district headquarters. The new district is primarily rural, with poor road infrastructure. As of December 2010, there are no hospitals in Buyende District.

Buyende District is part of Busoga sub-region. The districts that constitute Busoga sub-region include the following:

- Bugiri District
- Bugweri District
- Buyende District
- Iganga District
- Jinja District
- Kaliro District
- Kamuli District
- Luuka District
- Mayuge District
- Namayingo District
- Namutumba District

The sub-region is coterminous with Busoga Kingdom, one of the constitutional monarchies in today's Uganda. According to the 2002 national census, the subregion was home to an estimated 2.5 million people at that time.

== Population ==
In 1991, the national population census estimated the district population at about 130,800. The 2002 Uganda national census estimated the population of Buyende District at about 191,300, with a population growth rate of 3.5% annually. In 2012, the population of Buyende District was estimated at 265,100. According to the National Population and Housing Census 2024, Buyende District has now a population of 403,486.

== Economic activity ==
- Maize
- Cassava
- Beans
- Soya beans
- Millet
- Retail Business
- Printing Services

== Livestocks ==
- Cattle
- Chicken
- goats

== See also ==
- Buyende
- Eastern Uganda
- Victoria Nile
- Lake Kyoga
- Parliament of uganda
- Uganda Districts
