= Nabilatuk District =

District in Northern Uganda, Uganda

Coordinates: 2°02′N 34°32′E

- District
- Interactive map of Nabilatuk District
- Country: Uganda
- Region: Northern Uganda
- Sub-region: Karamoja sub-region
- Established: 1 July 2018
- Headquarters: Nabilatuk Town Council

Area
  - Total: 3,117 km^{2} (1,203 sq mi)

Population (2024 Census)
  - Total: 136,785
  - Density: 43.88/km^{2} (113.7/sq mi)
- Time zone: UTC+3 (EAT)

Nabilatuk District is a district in Northern Uganda.

== History ==
Parliament approved the creation of Nabilatuk District in 2015, with phased operationalisation of new districts. Operational work started on 1 July 2018 after creation from Nakapiripirit District.

== Geography ==
Nabilatuk District lies in the southern part of the Karamoja sub-region. Neighbouring districts include Moroto District to the north, Nakapiripirit District to the east and south, Napak District to the west and northwest, and Katakwi District to the southwest.

== Administration ==
The district forms part of Pian County (county-level administrative area). District local government information lists five sub-counties and one town council.

| Level | Name(s) | Source |
|---|---|---|
| County | Pian County | |
| Town council | Nabilatuk Town Council | |
| Sub-counties | Lorengedwat, Lolachat, Natirae, Nabilatuk, Kosike | |

== Population ==
The 2024 Ugandan census recorded 136,785 residents in Nabilatuk District (68,203 males and 68,582 females).

== Economy ==
District local government sources describe livelihoods centred on agro-pastoralism, with communities largely engaged in crop production and livestock keeping.

== Education ==
District sources report 16 government-aided primary schools and three secondary schools, with no tertiary institution listed by the district education department.

== Health ==
District sources list six health facilities, including one Health Centre IV, two Health Centre IIIs, and three Health Centre IIs (one listed as PNFP). UNICEF district materials for Nabilatuk report a similar facility mix and refer to village health teams serving communities.

== Culture and language ==
Nabilatuk District sits within Pian communities in Karamoja. Sources describe the main ethnic group as the Pian, with Ngakarimojong widely used in daily communication.

== See also ==
- Districts of Uganda
- Karamoja
- Nakapiripirit District
