= Kapelebyong District =

District in Eastern Region, Uganda

- District
- Interactive map of Kapelebyong District
- Country: Uganda
- Region: Eastern Region
- Sub-region: Teso sub-region
- Established: 1 July 2018
- Headquarters: Kapelebyong (Town Council)

Area
  - Total: 1,203 km^{2} (464 sq mi)

Population (2024 census)
  - Total: 143,367
  - Density: 119/km^{2} (310/sq mi)
- Time zone: UTC+3 (East Africa Time)

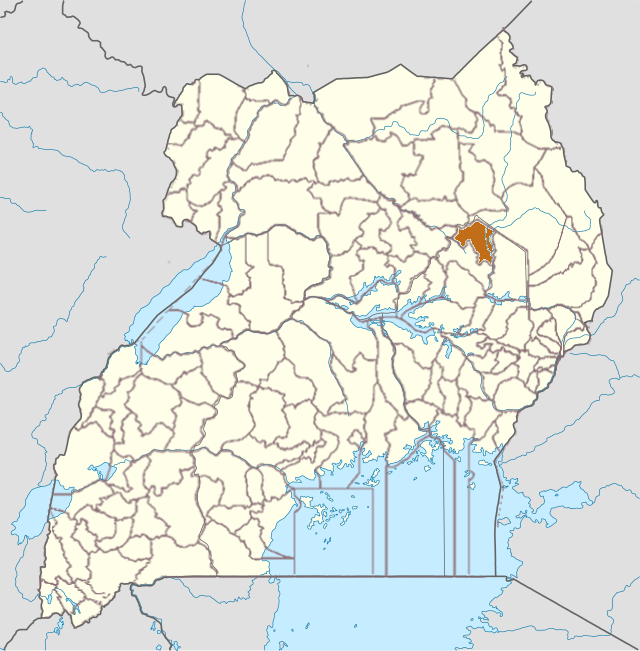
Kapelebyong District, Uganda

Kapelebyong District is a district in the Teso sub-region of the Eastern Region of Uganda. The district headquarters are in Kapelebyong Town Council.

== History ==
Kapelebyong District became operational on 1 July 2018 after being created from Amuria District.

In the 2014 national census, Amuria District recorded a population of 270,601 before the later creation of Kapelebyong District from its territory.

== Geography ==
The district headquarters (Kapelebyong Town Council) lie at about 2°17′36″N, 33°49′51″E.

Kapelebyong District borders Katakwi District to the east, Amuria District to the south, Otuke District to the north, and Napak District to the north-east. The district headquarters are about 81 km by road from Soroti via Amuria road.

According to UBOS census reporting, the district land area is 1,203 square kilometres.

== Administration ==
Kapelebyong District is governed through a district council structure. The district website describes the council as the supreme organ, supported by an executive committee and sectoral committees.

Lower local governments listed by the district include the sub-counties of Kapelebyong, Akoromit, Obalanga, Okungur, Acowa, Alito, and Acinga, and the town councils of Kapelebyong, Acowa, Obalanga, and Akore. A district profile document also reports 56 parishes or wards and 345 villages or cells.

== Demographics ==
In the 2024 National Population and Housing Census preliminary results, Kapelebyong District recorded a total population of 143,367, made up of 71,517 males and 71,850 females.

Using the 2024 census preliminary reporting, population density is 119 persons per square kilometre.

== Economy ==
District documentation describes agriculture as the main livelihood for most residents. It reports that over 87 percent of the population depends on agriculture, and that 86 percent of households were engaged in subsistence farming (figures reported by the district for local planning).

The same source lists key crops grown in the district, including finger millet, sorghum, groundnuts, cowpeas, sweet potatoes, cassava, maize, sesame, green grams, sunflower, vegetables, and beans, with rice cultivation reported in some wetland areas. It also reports livestock production as a key activity, and provides district estimates for local cattle, goats, sheep, pigs, and poultry (reported as 2019 status estimates by district offices).

== Livestock ==
- Chicken
- Cattle
- sheep
- Goat

== See also ==
- Districts of Uganda
- Eastern Region
- Teso sub-region
- Apac District
- Dokolo District
- Kole District
