= Bugweri District =

District in Eastern Uganda, Uganda

- District
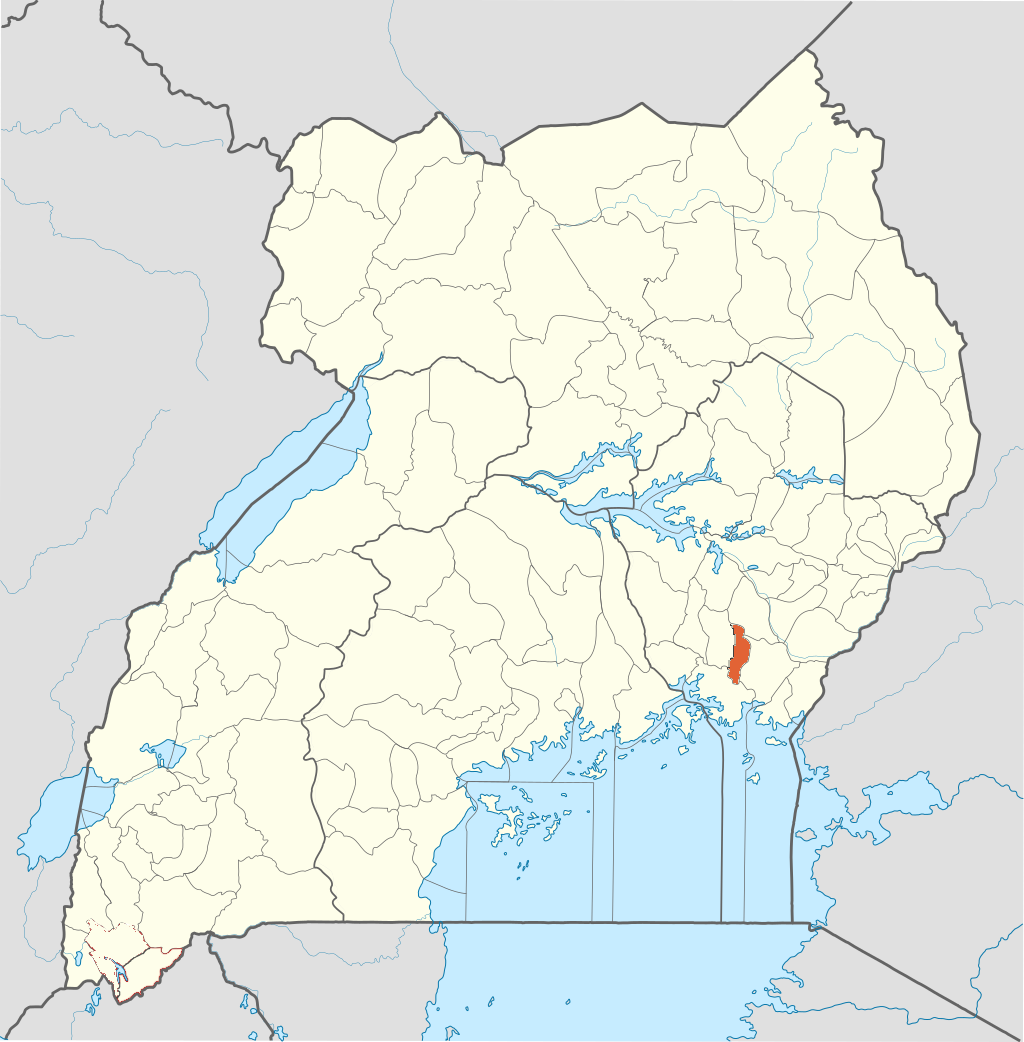
- District location in Uganda
- Coordinates: 0°38′N 33°37′E
- Country: Uganda
- Region: Eastern Uganda
- Established: 1 July 2018

Area
  - Total: 378.9 km^{2} (146.3 sq mi)

Population (2024 Census)
  - Total: 211,511
  - Density: 558.2/km^{2} (1,446/sq mi)
- Time zone: UTC+3 (EAT)
- Website: bugweri.go.ug

Bugweri District is a district in Busoga region, Eastern Uganda.

== History ==
Bugweri District was among the new districts approved by Parliament to start operations on 1 July 2018. The district was carved out of Iganga District.

== Geography ==
Bugweri District lies in the Busoga sub-region in Eastern Uganda. The district covers about 378.9 km2 and has gently undulating terrain.

== Administrative divisions ==
Bugweri District has eight lower local government units, five subcounties and three town councils.

Lower local government units in Bugweri District (NPHC 2024)
Unit	Type	Male	Female	Total
Ibulanku	Subcounty	11,341	12,434	23,775
Igombe	Subcounty	8,648	9,844	18,492
Makuutu	Subcounty	15,630	17,689	33,319
Buyanga	Subcounty	20,565	22,109	42,674
Namalemba	Subcounty	13,412	13,647	28,577
Bugweri Town Council	Town council	8,645	10,376	19,021
Idudi Town Council	Town council	10,654	13,130	23,874
Busembatia Town Council	Town council	10,188	11,681	21,869
Total		99,283	112,228	211,511

== Demographics ==
At the 2024 census, the district population was 211,511 (99,283 males and 112,228 females). The district reported 46,584 households and an average household size of 4.5.

== Economy ==
Small-scale agriculture is a major livelihood source in the district. The district profile lists maize and beans among key crops.

== Social services ==
=== Education ===
The district profile reports 54 government and 147 private primary schools, 8 government and 45 private secondary schools, and 2 tertiary institutions (1 government and 1 private).

=== Health ===
The district profile reports no hospitals, one Health Centre IV, seven Health Centre III facilities, and 21 Health Centre II facilities and clinics, for a total of 29 health facilities across government, PNFP, and private ownership.

== See also ==
- Districts of Uganda
- Busoga
- Eastern Region, Uganda
