= Districts of Uganda =

Administrative divisions of Uganda

As of 1 July 2020, Uganda is divided into 135 districts plus the capital city of Kampala, which are grouped into four geographic regions.

Since 2005, the Ugandan government has been in the process of dividing districts into smaller units. This decentralization is intended to prevent resources from being distributed primarily to chief towns and leaving the remainder of each district neglected.

Each district is further divided into counties and municipalities, and each county is further divided into sub-counties. The head elected official in a district is the chairperson of the Local Council five (usually written with a Roman numeral V).

Map of Uganda showing Districts as of 2020

Central Region (pink)
| Map | District | Pop (2014) | Pop(2023 est.) | Area | |
| Map | District | Pop (2014) | Pop(2023 est.) | km^{2} | sq mi |
|---|---|---|---|---|---|
| 77 | Buikwe | 422,771 | 499,800 | 574.7 | 221.9 |
| 90 | Bukomansimbi | 151,413 | 158,400 | 600.2 | 231.7 |
| 92 | Butambala | 100,840 | 110,900 | 405.6 | 156.6 |
| 78 | Buvuma | 89,890 | 154,200 | 218.3 | 84.3 |
| 93 | Gomba | 159,922 | 180,300 | 1,679.3 | 648.4 |
| 83 | Kalangala | 54,293 | 74,500 | 468.3 | 180.8 |
| 91 | Kalungu | 183,232 | 189,200 | 811.6 | 313.4 |
| 80 | Kampala | 1,507,080 | 1,766,500 | 811.6 | 313.4 |
| 95 | Kasanda | 271,544 | 334,100 | 1,919 | 741 |
| 76 | Kayunga | 368,062 | 427,100 | 1,587.8 | 613.1 |
| 97 | Kiboga | 148,218 | 183,300 | 1,586.9 | 612.7 |
| 98 | Kyankwanzi | 214,693 | 323,900 | 2,455.3 | 948.0 |
| 85 | Kyotera | 224,878 | 271,100 | 1,752 | 676 |
| 100 | Luweero | 456,958 | 558,100 | 2,217.6 | 856.2 |
| 87 | Lwengo | 274,953 | 297,200 | 914.7 | 353.2 |
| 88 | Lyantonde | 93,753 | 119,600 | 888.1 | 342.9 |
| 84 | Masaka | 297,004 | 364,800 | 1,295.6 | 500.2 |
| 96 | Mityana | 328,964 | 378,800 | 1,579.3 | 609.8 |
| 82 | Mpigi | 250,548 | 305,300 | 1,207.8 | 466.3 |
| 94 | Mubende | 412,804 | 641,800 | 2,711 | 1,047 |
| 79 | Mukono | 596,804 | 757,500 | 1,875.1 | 724.0 |
| 99 | Nakaseke | 197,373 | 254,900 | 3,477.3 | 1,342.6 |
| 101 | Nakasongola | 181,795 | 233,400 | 3,511.8 | 1,355.9 |
| 86 | Rakai | 291,431 | 338,900 | 1,592 | 615 |
| 89 | Sembabule | 252,597 | 319,300 | 2,318.4 | 895.1 |
| 81 | Wakiso | 1,997,418 | 3,519,300 | 1,906.7 | 736.2 |
| Total | | 9,529,238 | 12,762,200 | 40,413.4 | 15,603.7 |

Eastern Region (green)
| Map | District | Pop (2014) | Pop(2023 est.) | Area | |
| Map | District | Pop (2014) | Pop(2023 est.) | km^{2} | sq mi |
|---|---|---|---|---|---|
| 42 | Amuria | 183,348 | 248,500 | 1,382 | 534 |
| 64 | Budaka | 207,597 | 278,600 | 410.4 | 158.5 |
| 52 | Bududa | 210,173 | 307,200 | 250.8 | 96.8 |
| 58 | Bugiri | 382,913 | 536,400 | 1,045.9 | 403.8 |
| 60 | Bugweri | 164,886 | 205,600 | 379.1 | 146.4 |
| 46 | Bukedea | 203,600 | 291,800 | 1,051.7 | 406.1 |
| 50 | Bukwo | 89,356 | 137,200 | 524.9 | 202.7 |
| 47 | Bulambuli | 174,513 | 264,500 | 651.8 | 251.7 |
| 56 | Busia | 323,662 | 416,700 | 730.9 | 282.2 |
| 62 | Butaleja | 244,153 | 332,200 | 653.1 | 252.2 |
| 65 | Butebo | 144,971 | 125,700 | 237.9 | 91.9 |
| 70 | Buyende | 323,067 | 468,400 | 1,880.7 | 726.1 |
| 72 | Iganga | 339,311 | 436,800 | 638.6 | 246.6 |
| 74 | Jinja | 471,242 | 535,800 | 673 | 260 |
| 39 | Kaberamaido | 105,152 | 148,700 | 887.5 | 342.7 |
| 40 | Kalaki | 109,874 | 155,400 | 737.1 | 284.6 |
| 71 | Kaliro | 236,199 | 317,900 | 869.9 | 335.9 |
| 75 | Kamuli | 486,319 | 596,100 | 1,557 | 601 |
| 48 | Kapchorwa | 105,186 | 133,900 | 354.6 | 136.9 |
| 43 | Kapelebyong | 87,580 | 112,500 | 1,202 | 464 |
| 44 | Katakwi | 166,231 | 209,700 | 2,428.8 | 937.8 |
| 66 | Kibuku | 202,033 | 278,200 | 490.2 | 189.3 |
| 45 | Kumi | 239,268 | 309,500 | 1,074.6 | 414.9 |
| 49 | Kween | 93,667 | 118,000 | 851.4 | 328.7 |
| 73 | Luuka | 238,020 | 281,600 | 650.1 | 251.0 |
| 54 | Manafwa | 153,447 | 186,300 | 237.7 | 91.8 |
| 59 | Mayuge | 473,239 | 615,200 | 1,082.5 | 418.0 |
| 63 | Mbale | 488,960 | 639,700 | 518.8 | 200.3 |
| 57 | Namayingo | 215,443 | 247,400 | 532.9 | 205.8 |
| 53 | Namisindwa | 200,378 | 247,900 | 299.7 | 115.7 |
| 61 | Namutumba | 252,557 | 336,400 | 814.3 | 314.4 |
| 68 | Ngora | 141,919 | 178,400 | 721.4 | 278.5 |
| 67 | Pallisa | 241,919 | 399,500 | 859.3 | 331.8 |
| 69 | Serere | 285,903 | 401,800 | 1,965.4 | 758.8 |
| 51 | Sironko | 242,421 | 290,500 | 446.1 | 172.2 |
| 41 | Soroti | 296,833 | 401,000 | 1,411.9 | 545.1 |
| 55 | Tororo | 517,080 | 639,700 | 1,196.4 | 461.9 |
| Total | | 9,042,420 | 11,830,700 | 31,700.4 | 12,239.6 |

Northern Region (yellow)
| Map | District | Pop (2014) | Pop(2023 est.) | Area | |
| Map | District | Pop (2014) | Pop(2023 est.) | km^{2} | sq mi |
|---|---|---|---|---|---|
| 27 | Abim | 107,966 | 182,800 | 2,752 | 1,063 |
| 12 | Adjumani | 225,251 | 240,000 | 3,030.9 | 1,170.2 |
| 28 | Agago | 227,792 | 262,500 | 3,496.8 | 1,350.1 |
| 31 | Alebtong | 227,541 | 286,400 | 1,527.5 | 589.8 |
| 38 | Amolatar | 147,166 | 182,000 | 1,758 | 679 |
| 23 | Amudat | 105,769 | 151,900 | 1,615.4 | 623.7 |
| 13 | Amuru | 186,696 | 232,500 | 3,625.9 | 1,400.0 |
| 35 | Apac | 185,322 | 249,600 | 1,791 | 692 |
| 3 | Arua | 442,586 | 557,900 | 1,217 | 470 |
| 37 | Dokolo | 183,093 | 232,900 | 1,072.8 | 414.2 |
| 16 | Gulu | 275,613 | 352,500 | 1,872 | 723 |
| 20 | Kaabong | 116,346 | 134,400 | 4,104 | 1,585 |
| 19 | Karenga | 51,533 | 73,100 | 3,193 | 1,233 |
| 18 | Kitgum | 204,048 | 232,900 | 3,960 | 1,530 |
| 1 | Koboko | 206,495 | 287,500 | 759.7 | 293.3 |
| 33 | Kole | 239,327 | 308,800 | 1,071 | 414 |
| 21 | Kotido | 181,050 | 219,700 | 3,618 | 1,397 |
| 36 | Kwania | 183,304 | 234,600 | 1,408 | 544 |
| 17 | Lamwo | 134,371 | 148,100 | 5,595.8 | 2,160.6 |
| 32 | Lira | 408,043 | 516,000 | 1,328.9 | 513.1 |
| 7 | Madi-Okollo | 140,188 | 176,800 | 2,019 | 780 |
| 2 | Maracha | 186,134 | 219,500 | 439.1 | 169.5 |
| 22 | Moroto | 103,432 | 126,300 | 3,537.6 | 1,365.9 |
| 10 | Moyo | 95,951 | 116,400 | 1,041 | 402 |
| 25 | Nabilatuk | 68,409 | 102,500 | 1,805 | 697 |
| 24 | Nakapiripirit | 88,281 | 128,100 | 2,379 | 919 |
| 26 | Napak | 142,224 | 166,200 | 4,978.4 | 1,922.2 |
| 5 | Nebbi | 238,757 | 306,300 | 994.2 | 383.9 |
| 14 | Nwoya | 133,506 | 314,300 | 4,736.2 | 1,828.7 |
| 11 | Obongi | 43,061 | 52,300 | 847.1 | 327.1 |
| 15 | Omoro | 160,732 | 216,400 | 1,556 | 601 |
| 30 | Otuke | 104,254 | 150,600 | 1,549.8 | 598.4 |
| 34 | Oyam | 383,644 | 491,600 | 2,190.8 | 845.9 |
| 29 | Pader | 178,004 | 206,700 | 3,362.5 | 1,298.3 |
| 6 | Pakwach | 158,037 | 219,000 | 981.7 | 379.0 |
| 8 | Terego | 199,303 | 251,500 | 1,102 | 425 |
| 9 | Yumbe | 484,822 | 775,000 | 2,393 | 924 |
| 4 | Zombo | 240,081 | 306,100 | 897.6 | 346.6 |
| Total | | 7,188,132 | 9,411,700 | 85,607.7 | 33,053.3 |

Western Region (purple)
| Map | District | Pop (2014) | Pop(2023 est.) | Area | |
| Map | District | Pop (2014) | Pop(2023 est.) | km^{2} | sq mi |
|---|---|---|---|---|---|
| 122 | Buhweju | 120,720 | 156,900 | 687.1 | 265.3 |
| 104 | Buliisa | 113,161 | 171,300 | 1,141 | 441 |
| 111 | Bundibugyo | 224,387 | 285,000 | 848.2 | 327.5 |
| 112 | Bunyangabu | 170,247 | 208,000 | 498.3 | 192.4 |
| 123 | Bushenyi | 234,443 | 254,200 | 942.3 | 363.8 |
| 105 | Hoima | 305,531 | 413,100 | 1,566 | 605 |
| 118 | Ibanda | 249,625 | 290,900 | 964.8 | 372.5 |
| 127 | Isingiro | 486,360 | 658,100 | 2,655.6 | 1,025.3 |
| 136 | Kabale | 230,609 | 256,900 | 620 | 240 |
| 113 | Kabarole | 298,989 | 357,500 | 1,312 | 507 |
| 109 | Kagadi | 351,033 | 474,700 | 1,411 | 545 |
| 107 | Kakumiro | 293,108 | 601,900 | 1,668 | 644 |
| 116 | Kamwenge | 270,668 | 372,000 | 1,693 | 654 |
| 132 | Kanungu | 252,144 | 235,400 | 1,274 | 492 |
| 120 | Kasese | 694,987 | 843,900 | 3,199 | 1,235 |
| 117 | Kazo | 151,023 | 240,400 | 1,556 | 601 |
| 108 | Kibaale | 140,947 | 234,800 | 1,165 | 450 |
| 106 | Kikuube | 267,455 | 414,400 | 2,097 | 810 |
| 126 | Kiruhura | 177,054 | 205,300 | 3,043 | 1,175 |
| 102 | Kiryandongo | 266,197 | 339,200 | 3,624.1 | 1,399.3 |
| 133 | Kisoro | 281,705 | 332,200 | 644.6 | 248.9 |
| 119 | Kitagwenda | 143,786 | 197,800 | 715.6 | 276.3 |
| 115 | Kyegegwa | 281,637 | 551,900 | 1,747 | 675 |
| 114 | Kyenjojo | 422,204 | 584,400 | 2,350.1 | 907.4 |
| 103 | Masindi | 291,113 | 366,900 | 3,923 | 1,515 |
| 125 | Mbarara | 344,904 | 414,000 | 1,242 | 480 |
| 130 | Mitooma | 183,444 | 198,900 | 542.8 | 209.6 |
| 110 | Ntoroko | 67,005 | 80,700 | 1,236 | 477 |
| 129 | Ntungamo | 483,841 | 569,200 | 2,051 | 792 |
| 134 | Rubanda | 196,896 | 213,400 | 689.8 | 266.3 |
| 121 | Rubirizi | 129,149 | 151,500 | 985 | 380 |
| 135 | Rukiga | 100,726 | 107,200 | 426.3 | 164.6 |
| 131 | Rukungiri | 314,694 | 342,000 | 1,444.9 | 557.9 |
| 128 | Rwampara | 127,725 | 153,100 | 574.7 | 221.9 |
| 124 | Sheema | 207,343 | 226,300 | 699.1 | 269.9 |
| Total | | 8,874,860 | 11,503,400 | 50,550.2 | 19,517.5 |

== Districts created since 2015 ==
In September 2015, the Parliament of Uganda created 23 new districts, to be phased in over the next four years.

| Date effective | New district | Parent district |
|---|---|---|
| 1 July 2016 | Kagadi | Kibaale |
| 1 July 2016 | Kakumiro | Kibaale |
| 1 July 2016 | Omoro | Gulu |
| 1 July 2016 | Rubanda | Kabale |
| 1 July 2017 | Namisindwa | Manafwa |
| 1 July 2017 | Pakwach | Nebbi |
| 1 July 2017 | Butebo | Pallisa |
| 1 July 2017 | Rukiga | Kabale |
| 1 July 2017 | Kyotera | Rakai |
| 1 July 2017 | Bunyangabu | Kabarole |
| 1 July 2018 | Nabilatuk | Nakapiripirit |
| 1 July 2018 | Bugweri | Iganga |
| 1 July 2018 | Kasanda | Mubende |
| 1 July 2018 | Kwania | Apac |
| 1 July 2018 | Kapelebyong | Amuria |
| 1 July 2018 | Kikuube | Hoima |
| 1 July 2019 | Obongi | Moyo |
| 1 July 2019 | Kazo | Kiruhura |
| 1 July 2019 | Rwampara | Mbarara |
| 1 July 2019 | Kitagwenda | Kamwenge |
| 1 July 2019 | Madi-Okollo | Arua |
| 1 July 2019 | Karenga | Kaabong |
| 1 July 2019 | Kalaki | Kaberamaido |
| 1 July 2020 | Terego (Note: In May 2020, Parliament approved the creation of Terego District, which went into effect on 1 July 2020.) | Arua |

Notes

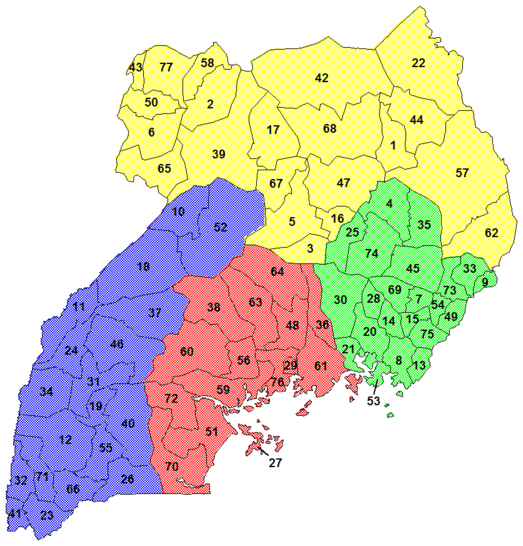
Ugandan districts as of 2006, when there were 77 districts.

== See also ==
- List of constituencies in Uganda
- Regions of Uganda
- Uganda Local Governments Association
- ISO 3166-2 codes for Ugandan regions and districts
