= Soroti District =

- District
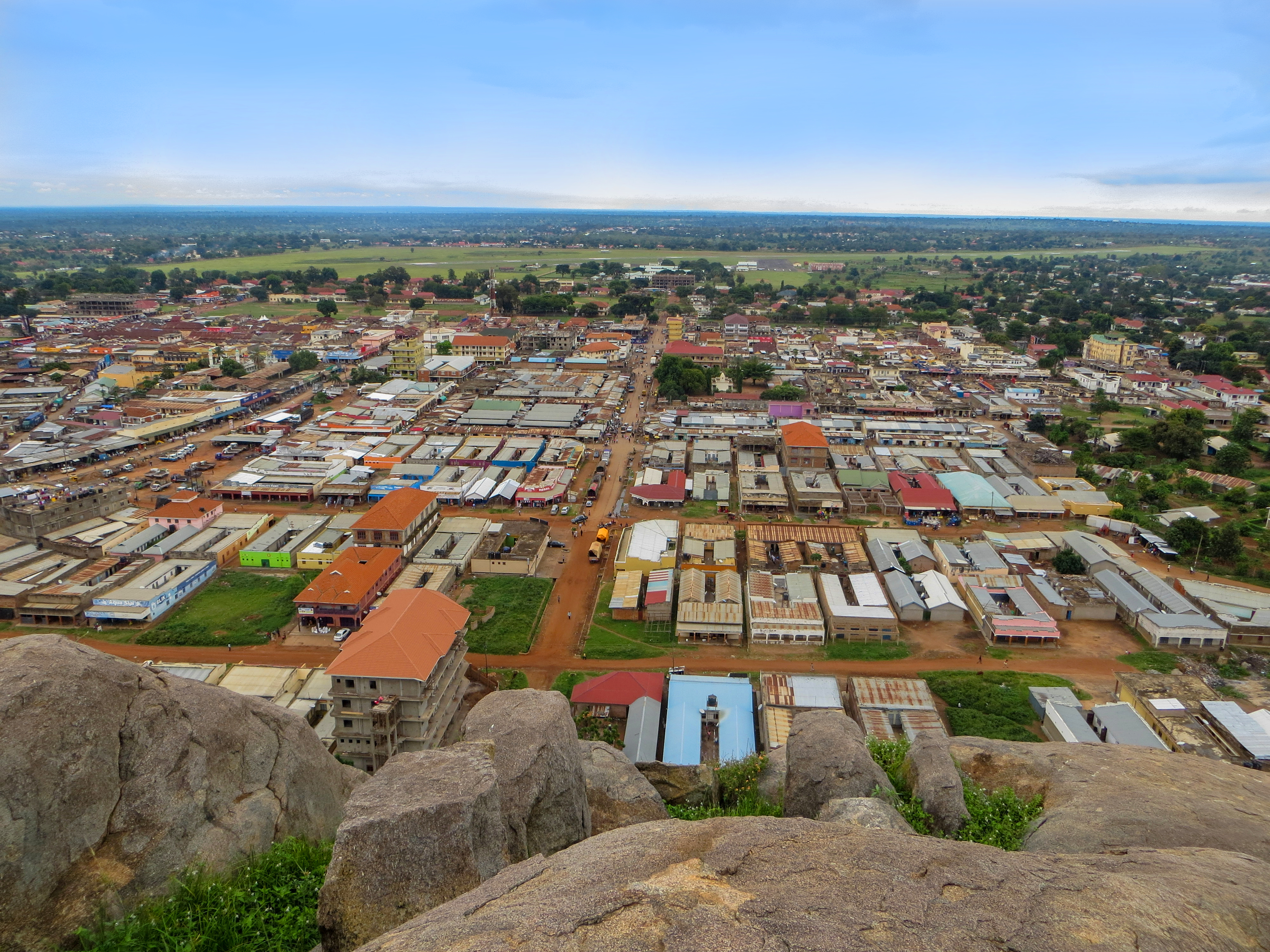

- District location in Uganda
- Coordinates: 01°43′N 33°36′E
- Country: Uganda
- Region: Eastern Uganda
- Sub-region: Teso sub-region
- Capital: Soroti

Area
  - Land: 1,411.9 km^{2} (545.1 sq mi)

Population (2011 Estimate)
  - Total: 322,000
  - Density: 228.1/km^{2} (591/sq mi)
- Time zone: UTC+3 (EAT)
- Website: www.soroti.go.ug

Soroti District is a district in Eastern Uganda. It is named after its chief municipal, administrative and commercial headquarters, Soroti, where the district headquarters are located.

== Location ==
Soroti District is bordered by Amuria District to the north, Katakwi District to the east, Ngora District to the southeast, Serere District to the south, and Kaberamaido District to the west. The city of Soroti, the district headquarters is located 116 kilometres (72 mi), by road, northwest of Mbale, the nearest large city.

== Overview ==
Soroti District is part of Teso sub-region, which includes the following districts:

- Amuria District
- Bukedea District
- Kaberamaido District
- Katakwi District
- Kumi District
- Ngora District
- Serere District
- Soroti District

The sub-region is home to an estimated 2.5 million people of Iteso and Kumam ethnicities.

== Population ==
The national census of 1991 estimated the district population at about 113,900. Eleven years later, the 2002 national census put the district population at approximately 193,300 of whom 51.2% were female and 48.8% were male. In 2011, the Uganda Bureau of Statistics estimated the District population at about 322,000.

The district has one of the highest levels of poverty in the country. In February 2009, it was estimated that 53 percent of the population in the district (an estimated 124,300 people) live on less than US$1.00 per day. The two predominant ethnicities in the district are the Iteso and the Kumam. The main languages spoken in the district are Ateso, Kumam, and Swahili.

== Economic activity ==
Agriculture is the main economic activity in the district. Crops grown include:

- Millet
- Cassava
- Peas
- Potatoes
- Beans
- Onions
- Tomatoes
- Cabbage
- Simsim
- Sunflower
- Cotton
- Sweet potato

The produce is consumed locally and some is sold in the urban areas, particularly in Soroti Town.

== other economic activities include: ==
- Grain milling
- Carpentry
- Fishing
- Printing Service
- Boda-boda Business
- Bookshops
- Wholesale and Retail sales
- Crop Marketing

== Livestock kept ==
- Cattle
- chicken
- Pigs
- Sheep
- Goats

== See also ==
- Soroti
- Teso sub-region
- Districts of Uganda
- Districts of Uganda
