= Katakwi District =

- District
- District location in Uganda
- Coordinates: 01°54′N 34°00′E
- Country: Uganda
- Region: Eastern Uganda
- Sub-region: Teso sub-region
- Established: 1 July 1997
- Capital: Katakwi

Area
  - Land: 2,428.8 km^{2} (937.8 sq mi)

Population (2012 Estimate)
  - Total: 176,800
  - Density: 72.8/km^{2} (189/sq mi)
- Time zone: UTC+3 (EAT)
- Website: www.katakwi.go.ug

Katakwi District is a district in the Eastern Region of Uganda. The town of Katakwi is the site of the district headquarters.

== Location ==
Katakwi District is bordered by Napak District to the north, Nakapiripirit District to the east, Kumi District to the south, Ngora District and Soroti District to the southwest and Amuria District to the west. The district's 'chief town', Katakwi, is located approximately 55 kilometres (34 mi), by road, north of Soroti, the largest town in the sub-region. The coordinates of the district are:01 54N, 34 00E.

== Overview ==
Katakwi District was created in 1997. It was formerly part of Soroti District. The district is located in the Teso sub-region, home to an estimated 2.5 million people of Iteso and Kumam ethnicities, according to the 2002 national census. In June 2005, the western part of the district was designated as Amuria District. The eight Ugandan districts that constitute Teso sub-region are:

- Amuria District
- Bukedea District
- Kaberamaido District
- Katakwi District
- Kumi District
- Ngora District
- Serere District
- Soroti District
- Kapelebyong District

== Population ==
In 1991, the population of Katakwi District was estimated at 75,200. The 2002 census estimated the population of the district at 118,900. The calculated population growth rate in the district is 4.3%. In 2012, the district population was estimated at 176,800. According to the (National Population and Housing Census 2014, UBoS, 2014), the population of Katakwi district was at 165,553 people of which 51.17% were female and 48.83% were male. This shows that the population increased at a growth rate of 3.9% . In 2024, National Population and Housing Census, the population of the district was 234,332 people with 50,864 total households.

== Economic activities ==
Subsistence agriculture and pastoral animal husbandry are the two main economic activities in Katakwi District. In recent years, attempts to start commercial agriculture have been initiated. Crops grown include the following:

- Cassava
- Millet
- Sorghum
- Groundnuts
- Simsim
- Sweet potatoes
- Cowpeas
- Maize
- Beans
- Peas

== Prominent people ==
Some of the prominent people from the district, include the following:

- Major (Retired) Jessica Alupo – Current Minister of Education & Sports in Uganda's Cabinet
- Proscovia Alengot Oromait – Former Member of Parliament for "Usuk County", Katakwi District. The youngest person to be elected to parliament on the African continent at age 19, in 2012.

== Livestock ==
- Cattle
- Goat
- Chicken
- Pig
- Turkey
- Duck

== See also ==
- Katakwi
- Teso
- Iteso
- Ateso
- Eastern Uganda
- Uganda District
- Parliament of Uganda
