= Teso sub-region =

Sub-region of Eastern Uganda

- Sub-region
- Country: Uganda
- Region: Eastern Region
- Largest town: Soroti

Area
  - Total: 13,030.6 km^{2} (5,031.1 sq mi)

Population (2024 census (preliminary))
  - Total: 2,462,344
  - Density: 199/km^{2} (520/sq mi)

Ethnic groups
  - Major: Iteso, Kumam
- Time zone: EAT (UTC+3)
- Language(s): Ateso and others

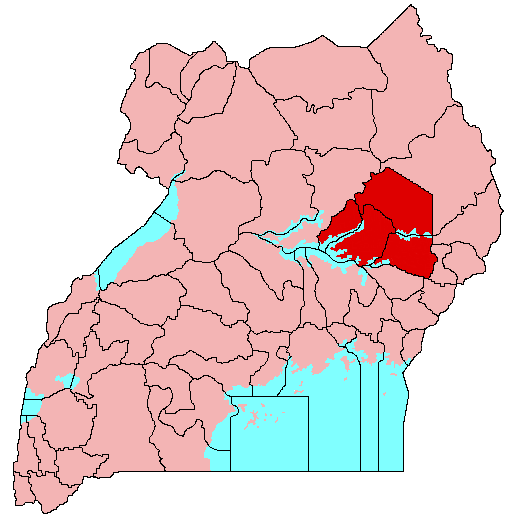
Teso sub-region

Teso sub-region (previously known as Teso District) is a sub-region in Eastern Region, Uganda that consists of:

- Amuria District
- Bukedea District
- Kaberamaido District
- Kalaki District
- Kapelebyong District
- Katakwi District
- Kumi District
- Ngora District
- Serere District
- Soroti District
- Soroti City

The sub-region covers an area of 13,030.6 km and is home to an estimated 2.5 million people of Iteso and Kumam ethnicity. The sub-region is home to the Iteso people, known for agriculture (especially citrus), cattle rearing, and distinct culture, encompassing districts like Soroti, Kumi, Amuria, and Katakwi, and facing challenges like past insecurity but showing potential in resources like oil, with strong cultural ties to other Nilotic groups.

Politically, Pallisa District does not belong to Teso Sub-region although Iteso tribes populate larger parts of this district.

== Geography ==
Teso sub-region borders Karamoja to the north and east, Lango to the west, and Bukedi to the south. Much of the countryside forms an undulating plateau with rock outcrops, plus shallow lakes, swamps, and extensive wetlands linked to the Lake Kyoga basin.

The sub-region has a bimodal rainfall pattern supporting two main cropping seasons. Vegetation includes grassland savannah, and soils are often sandy loam, varying with terrain.

== Administrative units ==
Teso sub-region includes ten districts plus Soroti City as a separate local government unit in the 2024 census reporting tables.

Administrative units in Teso sub-region (2024 preliminary census)
Local government unit	Land area (km^{2})	Population (2024)	Population density (persons/km^{2})
Kumi	1,776	287,275	162
Serere	1,520	357,806	235
Kaberamaido	1,045	140,977	135
Soroti District	1,448	266,164	184
Soroti (City)	125	133,774	1,070
Kalaki	1,049	150,075	143
Amuria	2,613	251,449	96
Bukedea	1,040	283,166	272
Katakwi	2,532	234,705	93
Ngora	742	213,586	288
Kapelebyong	938	143,367	153
Total (sub-region)	11,650	2,462,344	199

== Demographics ==
The 2024 census (preliminary results) reports population growth from 1,819,708 in 2014 to 2,462,344 in 2024 for Teso sub-region. The largest ethnic group is the Iteso, and the sub-region also includes communities such as the Kumam, including areas of intermarriage.

== Languages ==
The main language is Ateso (Teso), an Eastern Nilotic language spoken in Uganda and Kenya. Ethnologue lists Ateso under ISO 639-3 code teo.

== Economy ==
Agriculture is a major livelihood. Common crops include cassava, sorghum, finger millet, groundnuts, rice, and sweet potatoes, plus oilseed crops and cotton as a major cash crop in parts of the farming system. Mixed crop and livestock production is widespread, with cattle, goats, sheep, and poultry, and ox-plough cultivation is common in farming practice. A regional profile by Encyclopaedia Britannica notes early adoption of ox ploughs among Teso farmers and cotton cultivation during the early 1900s, with millet as a key staple crop.

== Environment and tourism ==
Wetlands linked to the Lake Kyoga system support birdlife, including species associated with the Lake Opeta–Bisina wetland system highlighted in regional profiles. Two Ramsar sites in eastern Uganda linked to this wetland complex include Lake Bisina Wetland System and Lake Opeta Wetland System.

The sub-region also includes heritage sites such as the Nyero rock paintings in Kumi District, listed on Uganda’s UNESCO World Heritage Tentative List (submission date 10 September 1997).

== Transport and education ==
Soroti Airfield serves aviation training and is used by the East African Civil Aviation Academy (Soroti), with some ad hoc commercial operations. The East African Civil Aviation Academy reports establishment in 1971 under the then East African Community’s Directorate of Civil Aviation.

== History ==
The late 1980s and early 1990s period included an armed insurgency in parts of the sub-region involving the Uganda People's Army, a group recruited largely from the Iteso, active from 1987 to 1992. Livestock raiding and insecurity along the Karamoja border has also affected neighbouring districts in northeastern Uganda in multiple periods, including early 2000s reporting on raids into bordering districts.

== Culture ==
Cultural leadership among the Iteso is organised under the Iteso Cultural Union, headed by the Emorimor (paramount chief). Media reporting identifies Emorimor Paul Sande Emolot as a recent cultural leader in public functions.

== See also ==
- Regions of Uganda
- Teso people
- Teso language
- Soroti
- Nyero rock paintings
- Lake Kyoga
- Karamoja
