= Amuria District =

- District
- District location in Uganda
- Coordinates: 02°02′N 33°39′E
- Country: Uganda
- Region: Eastern Uganda
- Sub-region: Teso sub-region
- Capital: Amuria

Area
  - Land: 2,588.3 km^{2} (999.3 sq mi)

Population (2014 Estimate)
  - Total: 183,348
  - Density: 157/km^{2} (410/sq mi)
- Time zone: UTC+3 (EAT)
- Website: www.amuria.go.ug

Amuria District is a district in the Eastern Region of Uganda. The town of Amuria serves as the district headquarters.

== Location ==
Amuria District is bordered by Otuke District to the north, Napak District to the northeast, Katakwi District to the east, Soroti District to the south, Kaberamaido District to the southwest, and Alebtong District to the west. The town of Amuria is located approximately 45 kilometres (28 mi) north of Soroti, the largest town in the sub-region.

== Overview ==
The district is composed of two counties: Amuria County and Orungo County.

== Population ==
In 1991, the national population census estimated the population of the district at 69,400. The 2002 census estimated the population at 180,000. In 2014, the population was estimated at 183,348.In 2015 it was at 188,600, in 2020 the population was at 225,000 and recent census of 2023 put the figure at 248,500.

== Economic activities ==
The economy of Amuria District is based on two main activities: subsistence agriculture and animal husbandry. Over 90 percent of the population engages in either or both activities. and the crops include:

- Maize
- Cassava
- Beans

== Prominent people ==
- Jeje Odongo, a full general and politician, served as an Army Commander of the Uganda People's Defence Force between 1998 and 2001. He served as the elected member of parliament for this district between 1988 and 1996. Also served as State Minister for Defence and Minister of Internal Affairs in the Cabinet of Uganda. Hon. Jeje Odongo, is Minister of Foreign Affairs in the ruling NRM Government.

== Livestock kept by the population ==
- Cattle
- Chicken
- Pig

== See also ==
- Iteso people
- Kumam
- Teso language
- Districts of Uganda
- Eastern Region, Uganda
