= Eastern Region, Uganda =

Region of Uganda

Eastern
- Region
- Coordinates: 00°25′N 033°12′E
- Country: Uganda
- Region: Eastern
- Regional capital: Jinja

Area
  - Total: 39,478.8 km^{2} (15,242.8 sq mi)
- Elevation: 1,143 m (3,750 ft)

Population (2014 census)
  - Total: 9,042,422
  - Estimate (2011): 8,623,300
  - Density: 229.045/km^{2} (593.224/sq mi)
- Time zone: UTC+3 (EAT)
- HDI (2019): 0.544 low · 2nd

The Eastern region is one of four regions in Uganda. As of Uganda's 2014 census, the region's population was 9,042,422.

== Districts ==
As of 2010, the Eastern Region contained 32 districts:

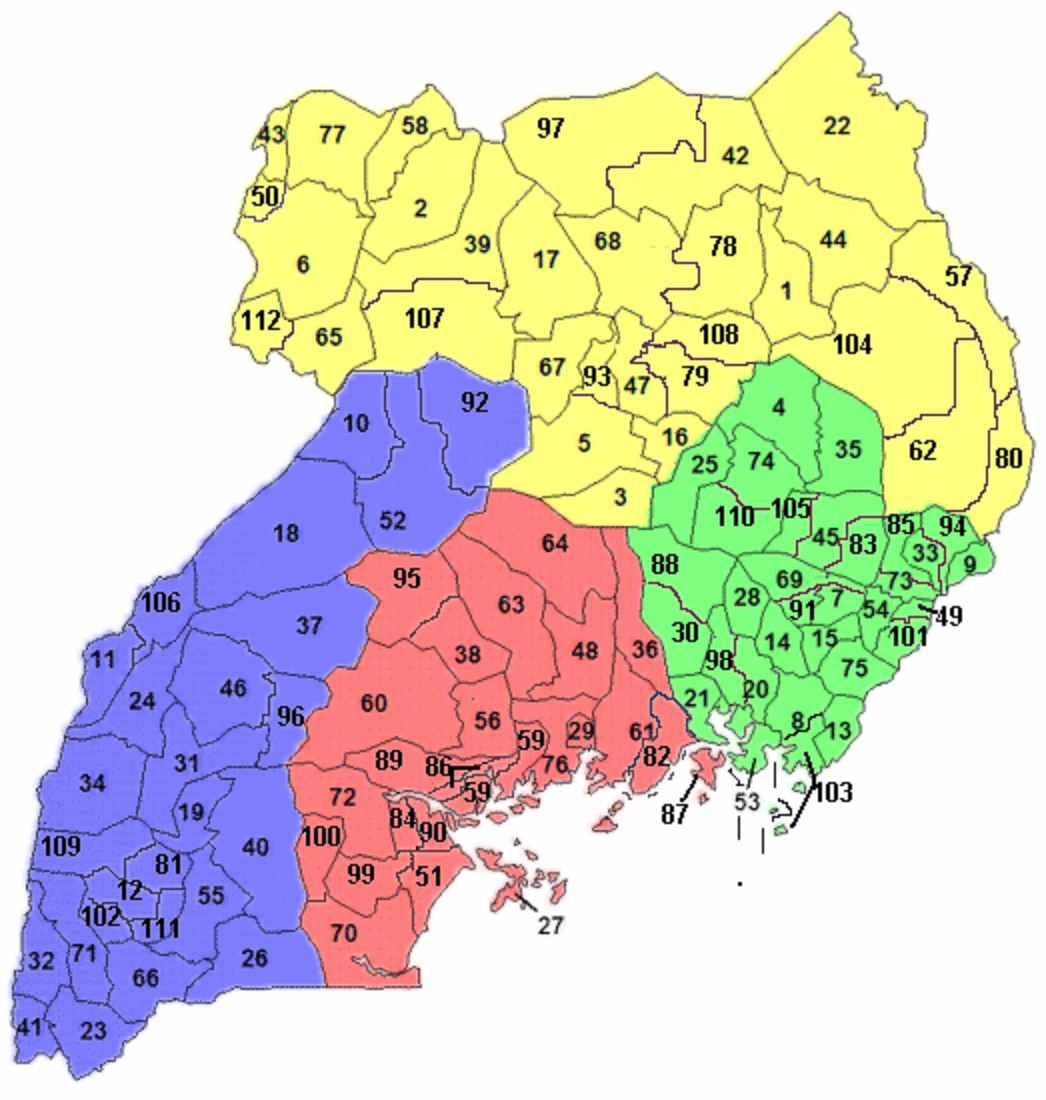
Eastern region in green.

District	Population (Census 1991)	Population (Census 2002)	Population (Census 2014)	Map	Chief town
Amuria	69,353	180,022	270,928	4	Amuria
Budaka	100,348	136,489	207,597	7	Budaka
Bududa	79,218	123,103	210,173	49	Bududa
Bugiri	171,269	266,944	382,913	8	Bugiri
Bukedea	75,272	122,433	203,600	83	Bukedea
Bukwa	30,692	48,952	89,356	9	Bukwa
Bulambuli	64,576	97,273	174,508	85	Bulambuli
Busia	163,597	225,008	323,662	13	Busia
Butaleja	106,678	157,489	244,153	15	Butaleja
Buyende	130,775	191,266	323,067	88	Buyende
Iganga	235,348	355,473	504,197	20	Iganga
Jinja	289,476	387,573	471,242	21	Jinja
Kaberamaido	81,535	131,650	215,026	25	Kaberamaido
Kalaki	(Pat of Kaberamaido)		109,874		Kalaki
Kaliro	105,122	154,667	236,199	28	Kaliro
Kamuli	249,317	361,399	486,319	30	Kamuli
Kapchorwa	48,667	74,268	105,186	33	Kapchorwa
Katakwi	75,244	118,928	166,231	35	Katakwi
Kibuku	91,216	128,219	202,033	91	Kibuku
Kumi	102,030	165,365	239,268	45	Kumi
Kween	37,343	67,171	93,667	94	Binyiny
Luuka	130,408	185,526	238,020	98	Luuka
Manafwa	178,528	262,566	353,825	101	Manafwa
Mayuge	216,849	324,674	473,239	53	Mayuge
Mbale	240,929	332,571	488,960	54	Mbale
Namayingo	68,038	145,451	215,442	103	Namayingo
Namutumba	123,871	167,691	252,562	14	Namutumba
Ngora	59,392	101,867	141,919	105	Ngora
Pallisa	166,092	255,870	386,890	69	Pallisa
Serere	90,386	176,479	285,903	110	Serere
Sironko	147,729	97,273	242,422	73	Sironko
Soroti	113,872	193,310	296,833	74	Soroti
Tororo	285,299	379,399	517,082	75	Tororo
Total	4,128,469	6,204,915	9,042,422	-	Mbale
