= Pallisa District =

- District
- District location in Uganda
- Coordinates: 01°01′N 33°43′E
- Country: Uganda
- Region: Eastern Uganda
- Capital: Pallisa

Area
  - Total: 1,487.7 km^{2} (574.4 sq mi)
  - Land: 1,095.7 km^{2} (423.1 sq mi)
  - Water: 392 km^{2} (151 sq mi)

Population (2012 Estimate)
  - Total: 362,600
  - Density: 330.9/km^{2} (857/sq mi)
- Time zone: UTC+3 (EAT)
- Website: www.pallisa.go.ug

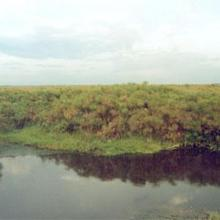
Lake Nakuwa Wetland,a located in pallisa district.

Pallisa District is a district in Eastern Uganda which was carved out of Tororo district in 1991. Like most other Ugandan districts, it is named after its main town, Pallisa, where the district headquarters are located.

== Location ==
Pallisa District is bordered to the north by (from west to east): Serere District, Ngora District, Kumi District and Bukedea District. Mbale District lies to the east. Budaka District lies to the southeast, Kibuku District to the southwest and Kaliro District to the west. Pallisa, the 'chief town' of the district, is located approximately 65 kilometres (40 mi), by road, west of Mbale, the largest city in the sub-region. The coordinates of the district are: 01 01N, 33 43E.

== Population ==
During the 1991 national population census, the district population was put at about 166,100. The 2002 national census estimated the population of the district at 255,900. In 2012, the population of Pallisa District was estimated at 362,600.

== Economic activities ==
Subsistence crop agriculture and animal husbandry are the two major economic activities in the district. To a lesser extent, fishing, fish farming and bee keeping are increasingly practiced in Pallisa District. The major crops include:

- Cassava
- Millet
- Sorghum
- Maize
- Groundnuts
- Beans
- Peas
- Sweet potatoes
- Rice
- Cotton
- Sunflower
- Soybeans
- Bananas
- Matooke

Cattle, goats, sheep, poultry, pigs, are some of the animals raised in the district. The district is further blessed with nine minor lakes that comprise part of the Lake Kyoga system. The lakes include:

- Lake Lemwa
- Lake Kawi
- Lake Nakwa
- Lake Meito
- Lake Geme
- Lake Omunuo
- Lake Nyanzala
- Lake Nyaguo

There are nine stocked fish farms in the district. Fish farming offers a big potential to increase the supply of fish for the population and hence improve on the nutrition of the population. Fish species include:

- Carp
- Oreochromis niloticus
- Clarias spp.

== Counties ==
These counties include:

- Agule county
- Gogonyo county
- Kibale county
- Pallisa county

== Sub-counties ==
Pallisa District has 14 sub-counties:

- Agule
- Apopong
- Butebo
- Gogonyo
- Kabwangasi
- Kakoro
- Kameke
- Kamuge
- Kasodo
- Kibale
- Pallisa
- Pallisa Tc
- Petete
- Puti-puti

.

== Livestock ==
- Cattle
- Goat
- Chicken
- Duck
- Turkey

== See also ==
- Pallisa
- Eastern Region, Uganda
- Parliament of Uganda
- Districts of Uganda
