= Kaberamaido District =

- District
- District location in Uganda
- Coordinates: 01°47′N 33°09′E
- Country: Uganda
- Region: Eastern Uganda
- Sub-region: Teso sub-region
- Capital: Kaberamaido

Area
  - Total: 1,788.5 km^{2} (690.5 sq mi)
  - Land: 1,354.5 km^{2} (523.0 sq mi)
  - Water: 434 km^{2} (168 sq mi)
- Elevation: 1,080 m (3,540 ft)

Population (2012 Estimate)
  - Total: 199,200
  - Density: 147.1/km^{2} (381/sq mi)
- Time zone: UTC+3 (EAT)
- Website: www.kaberamaido.go.ug

Kaberamaido is a district in Eastern Uganda. Like most other Ugandan districts, it is named after its 'chief town', Kaberamaido, where the district headquarters are located.

== Location ==
Kaberamaido District lies approximately between Latitudes:1.5500 to 2.3834 and Longitudes:30.0167 to 34.3000. The average coordinates of the district are:01 47N, 33 09E. The district is bordered by Kalaki District to the east and northeast, Serere District to the southeast, Buyende District to the south, Amolatar District to the southwest and Dokolo District to the north and northwest. The District headquarters at Kaberamaido lies approximately 65 kilometres (40 mi) by road, west of Soroti, the largest city in the sub-region. It lies approximately 215 kilometres (134 mi), by road, northeast of Kampala, the capital of Uganda and the nation's largest city.

== Physical measurements ==
The following are the district measurements:

- Total Area : 1,788.5 square kilometres (690.5 mi^{2})
- Total Land Area : 1,354.5 square kilometres (523.0 mi^{2}) (75.7%)
- Forest Area : 22 square kilometres (8.5 sq mi) (1.3%)
- Open Water Area : 269 square kilometres (104 mi^{2}) (16.4%)
- Area Under Wetlands : 143 square kilometres (55 mi^{2}) (8.7%)

== Population ==
In 1991, the national population census estimated the population of the district at about 81,500. The district had a population of approximately 131,700 in 2002, according to the national census that year, with an annual population growth rate of 4.3%. In 2012, it was estimated that the population of Kaberamaido District was approximately 199,200. The table below, illustrates how the district has grown between 2002 and 2012. All numbers are estimates.

Kaberamaido District Population Trends

Year	Est. Pop.
2002	131,700
2003	137,200
2004	143,000
2005	149,000

Year	Est. Pop.
2006	155,300
2007	161,800
2008	168,600
2009	175,700

Year	Est. Pop.
2010	183,100
2011	190,800

== Ethnicities ==
Kaberamaido District is the main area of the Kumam people. In 2008, the Kumam were in the majority, totaling 99,738 (74.7%) of the population. The Iteso were the next most populous group in the district, totaling 27,317 people (20.5%). These two ethnicities respectively, speak Kumam and Ateso languages and are of the Nilotic family. The Langi at 4,617 people (3.5%) are the next most populous group. The other tribal groups found in the district constitute less than 1% of the district population in individual tribal terms. These include, the Acholi, Bagwere, Bakenyi, Baruli, Mening, Basoga, Baganda and Alur.

== Economic activity ==
- Maize
- Cassava
- Beans
- Groundnuts

== Livestock ==
- Cattle
- Chicken
- Pig
- Goat

== See also ==
- Kaberamaido
- Teso
- Eastern Uganda
- Uganda Districts
