= Bukedea District =

- District
- District location in Uganda
- Coordinates: 01°21′N 34°03′E
- Country: Uganda
- Region: Eastern Region of Uganda
- Sub-region: Teso sub-region
- Capital: Bukedea

Area
  - Land: 1,051.7 km^{2} (406.1 sq mi)

Population (2012 Estimate)
  - Total: 186,400
  - Density: 177.2/km^{2} (459/sq mi)
- Time zone: UTC+3 (EAT)
- Website: bukedea.go.ug

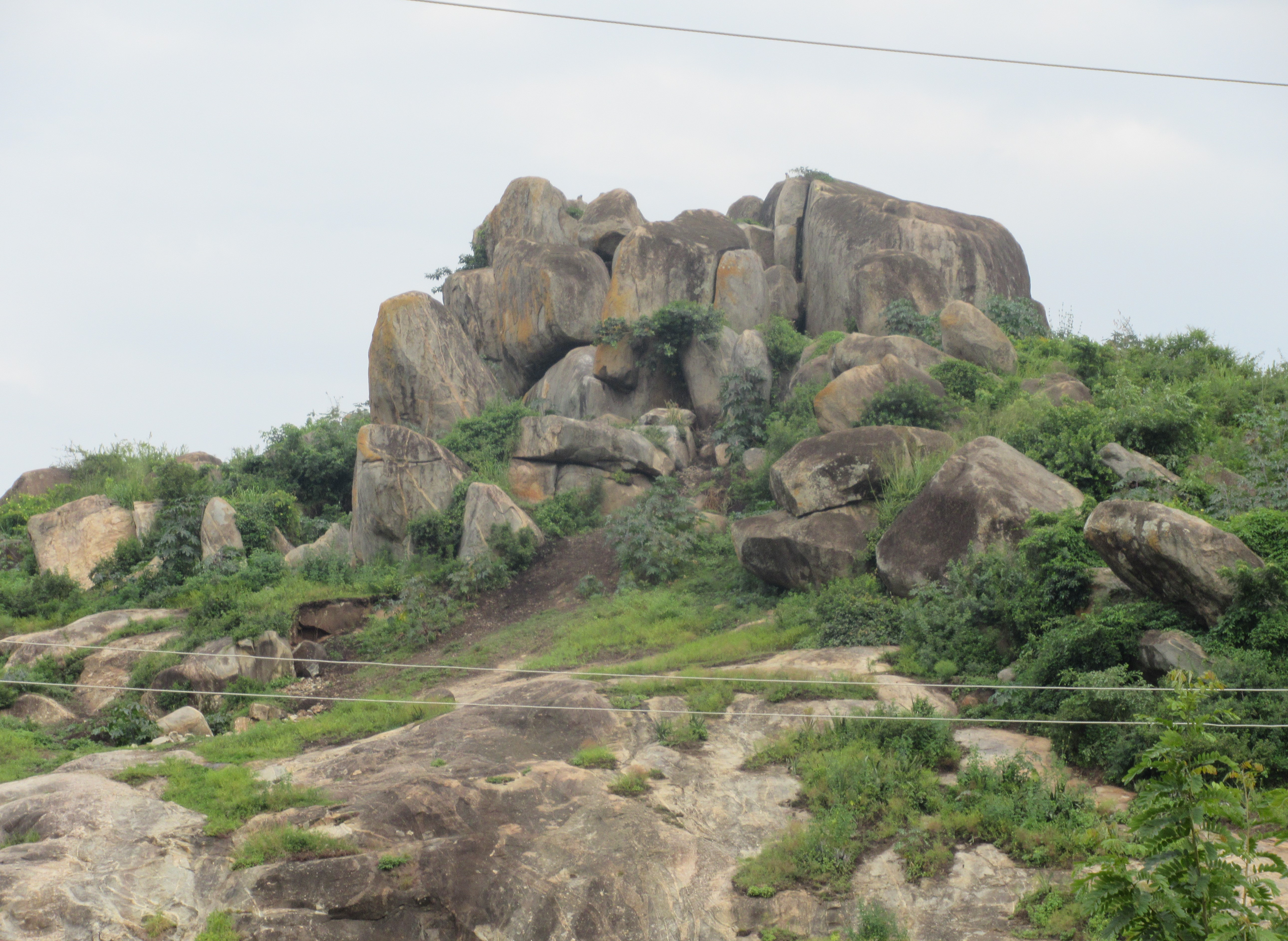
Rocks in Kachumbala Subcounty, Bukedea District.

Bukedea District is a district in the Eastern Region of Uganda. The town of Bukedea is the site of the district headquarters.

== Location ==
Bukedea District is bordered by Kumi District to the west and north, Bulambuli District to the east, Sironko District and Mbale District to the south-east, and Pallisa District to the south. The district headquarters at Bukedea are approximately 79 kilometres (49 mi), by road, south-east of Soroti, the largest city in the Teso sub-region.

== Overview ==
Bukedea District was created by an Act of the Ugandan parliament on 13 July 2006 and became operational on 1 July 2007. Before that, the district was part of Kumi District.

== Population ==
The 1991 census estimated the district population at 75,300. The national census in 2002 estimated the population at 122,400. The annual population growth rate in the district was calculated at 4.4 percent. In 2012, the population was estimated at 186,400.

== Economic activity ==
- Maize
- Matooke
- Irish potatoes

== Livestock ==
- Cattle
- Chicken
- Goat

== See also ==
- Bugisu sub-region
- Districts of Uganda
