= Kumi District =

- District
- District location in Uganda
- Coordinates: 01°30′N 33°57′E
- Country: Uganda
- Region: Eastern Uganda
- Sub-region: Teso sub-region
- Capital: Kumi

Area
  - Land: 1,074.6 km^{2} (414.9 sq mi)

Population (2012 Estimate)
  - Total: 255,500
  - Density: 237.8/km^{2} (616/sq mi)
- Time zone: UTC+3 (EAT)
- Website: www.kumi.go.ug

Kumi District is a district in the Eastern Region of Uganda. The district is named after its main town, Kumi, which also hosts the district headquarters.

== Location ==
Kumi District is bordered by Katakwi District to the north, Nakapiripirit District to the northeast, Bukedea District to the east, Pallisa District to the south, and Ngora District to the west. The main town in the district, Kumi, is located approximately 54 kilometres (34 mi) southeast of Soroti, the largest town in Teso sub-region. The coordinates of the district are:01 30N, 33 57E.

== Population ==
The 1991 national census estimated the population of the district at about 102,030. The 2002 national census estimated the district population at approximately 165,400. The annual population growth rate in the district is given as 4.5%. In 2012, the population of Kumi District was estimated at 255,500. The table below illustrates how the district population has grown between 2002 and 2012. All numbers are estimates.

Kumi District Population Trends

Year	Est. Pop.
2002	165,400
2003	172,800
2004	180,600
2005	188,700

Year	Est. Pop.
2006	197,200
2007	206,100
2008	215,400
2009	225,100

Year	Est. Pop.
2010	235,200
2011	245,800

== Transport ==
Kumi District is served by a road transport networks consisting of one major highway and several other streets. The quality of the road network has been influenced by UNRA. People make use of commercial buses to get around. Prices of bus tickets fluctuate during the holiday season.

== Economic activity ==
- Grain milling
- Wholesale business
- Carpentry
- Construction
- Bookshop business

== Livestock ==
- Cattle
- Chicken
- Pig
- Duck
- Sheep
- Turkey

== See also ==
- Kumi
- Teso sub-region
- Railway stations in Uganda
- Eastern Region, Uganda
- Districts of Uganda
