= Lawrence Mangusho =

Ugandan politician

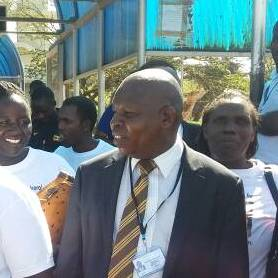
- Mangusho in 2017

Honorable

Personal details
- Born: Lawrence Cherop Mangusho; 12 August 1961 (age 65) Kween, Uganda
- Education: Makerere institute (Certificate in Public Administration and Management); Makerere Metropolitan Management Institute (Diploma in Social Work & Social Administration)
- Occupation: Farmer, politician
- Known for: Public administration, politics

Lawrence Cherop Mangusho (born 12 August 1961) is a Ugandan public administrator, farmer and politician. He was the elected member of parliament for Kween County, Kween District, and a representative for National Resistance Movement (NRM), the ruling political party in Uganda. He is a member the NRM Parliamentary Caucus and serves on the Committee on Physical Infrastructure and the Committee on Government Assurances in the 10th Parliament of Uganda.

Mangusho formerly served as the LCV chairperson and councilor for Kween District Local Government and as the LCV councilor, finance secretary and chairperson district tender board for Kapchorwa District Local Government. He also previously served as the NRM district chairperson for Kween and Kapchorwa Districts.

== Early life and education ==
Mangusho was born in Kaproron Subcounty, Kween District, on 12 August 1961 in an Anglican family of the Sebei. His father Reuben Thwamun was a primary school teacher and his mother Susan Cheptoyek a peasant farmer. He had his primary education at Chemwania Primary School and attained his PLE certification in 1977.

He then progressed to Sebei Secondary School for his O-Level education and Green Light High School for his A-Level education, attaining a UCE certification in 1981 and a UACE certification in 2013. He was an athlete at Sebei Secondary School.

Mangusho also attended the Ministry of Works and Transport's Mt Elgon Labour-based Training Centre (MELTC), where he attained a Certificate in Contract Management in 1998 and Makerere institute's Institute of Adult and Continuing Education for a Certificate in Public Administration in 2006. In 2016, he attained a Diploma in Social Work & Social Administration (Dip. SWASA) from Makerere Metropolitan Management Institute (MMMI). Additionally, Mangusho has 2003 Certificate in Entrepreneurship from Enterprise Uganda. Despite all this Mr. Mangusho has never attended university education. He primarily focused on achieving horizontal skills by attending many certificate and diploma awarding institutions in kampala and Mbale districts following cancellation of his 2011 LCV victory elections.

== Career and politics ==
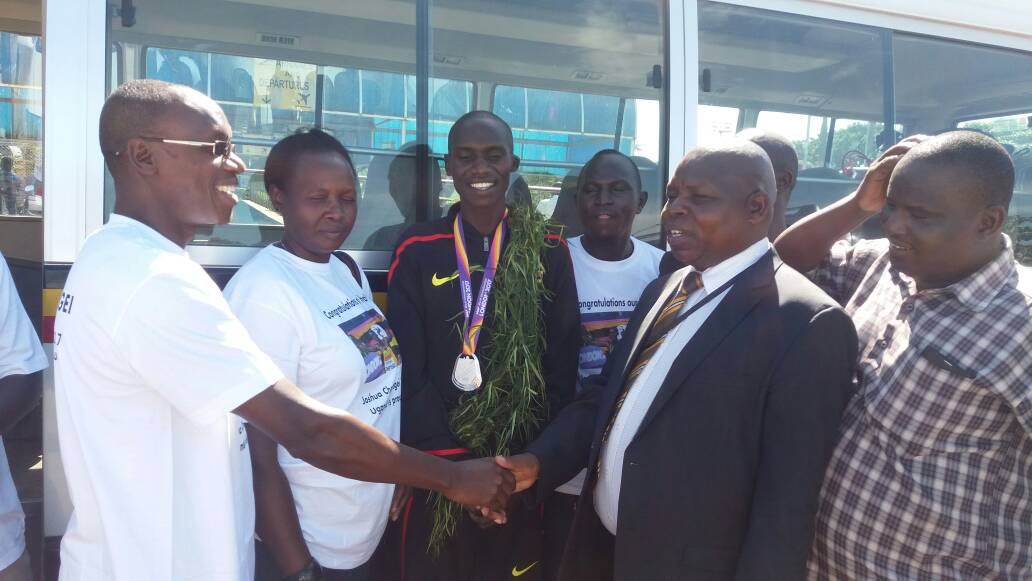
Mangusho receiving silver medalist Cheptegei at Entebbe International Airport

Earlier in his career, Mangusho served as a member and later on as chairperson of the Kapchorwa District tender board from 1993 to 1997. From about the same time and up until 1998, he served as the finance secretary for Kween County on the LCV Council for Kapchorwa District. In 1998, he became an LCV Councilor for Kapchorwa District Local Government and served in that capacity up until 2010 when Kween County was upgraded to a district.

From 2010 to 2011, he served as the LCV councilor for the then newly founded Kween District Local Government and was eventually elected LCV chairperson for the district in 2011. He lost the elective position in the 2012 by-elections and became a full-time farmer from then on.

On involuntarily losing the LCV chairmanship, Mangusho strategized for the 2016 parliamentary polls, a move that saw him win both the NRM party's 2015 primary elections and the 2016 general elections thereby becoming a member of the 10th Parliament for the Pearl of Africa representing Kween County in Kween District. In the 10th Parliament, Mangusho serves on the Committee on Physical Infrastructure and the Committee on Government Assurances. He is also a member of the NRM Parliamentary Caucus, the Parliamentary Forum on Climate Change (PFCC), the Uganda Parliamentary Forum on Water Sanitation and Hygiene, as well as the Uganda Parliamentary Forum on Youth Affairs (UPFYA). In late 2017, residents of Kween County in Kween District accused their area member of parliament, Mr Lawrence Mangusho of allegedly grabbing land and evicting hundreds of people in several villages in two Sub counties of Ngenge and Kiriki.

== See also ==
- Kween District
- National Resistance Movement
- Parliament of Uganda
- Sebei people
