= Vincent Woboya =

Ugandan politician

Honorable

Personal details
- Born: Vincent Woboya; 1 July 1974 (age 52) Budadiri, Sironko – Uganda
- Citizenship: Uganda
- Education: Makerere University (Bachelors in Social Sciences) (Masters in Public Administration and Management)
- Occupation: Administrator, politician
- Known for: Public administration, disaster management & politics

Vincent Woboya (born 1 July 1974) is a Ugandan public administrator, disaster manager and politician. He is the elected Member of Parliament for Budadiri County East, Sironko District and a representative for NRM, the ruling political party in Uganda.

Woboya is the NRM whip for Bugisu sub-region and is a member of both the Committee on Commissions, State Authorities & State Enterprises and the Committee On Presidential Affairs in the 10th Parliament of Uganda.

In 2006, while working in the Office of the Prime Minister (OPM), Woboya with the assistance of UNDP and the Danish demining group (DDG) spearheaded the implementation of a humanitarian demining program, the National Mine Action Programme (NMAP), in parts of Northern Uganda that were heavily affected by the 20-year LRA insurgency. This combined effort led to official declaration of Uganda as a landmine free country on 10 December 2012.

== Early life and education ==
Woboya was born in Bumasifwa, a village in Sironko District, on 1 July 1974 in an Anglican family of five boys and a girl. A member of the Dunga Clan of the Bamasaba, his father Francis Namugowa was a primary school teacher and his mother Zita Wolayo Namugowa, a subsistence farmer.

He attended Bumasifwa Primary School and Bumasaga Primary School in Mbale for his primary school education as well as Mbale Senior Secondary School for his O-level and A-Level academic qualifications. As a day scholar, he trekked 6 kilometers to get to his secondary school. He had his first taste at leadership in Senior 3 when he was democratically elected Health Prefect and then as Chairman of the History Club in Senior 5.

Woboya further advanced to Makerere University for his University education where he graduated in 1997 with a Bachelor of Social Science in Political Science and Public Administration. While at the Ivory Tower, Woboya served as a member of the Guild Representative Council (GRC). He also served as the chairperson for Budadiri Students Association and was an executive for the Mbale Students Association (MUMBASA). Still in the same institution of higher education, Woboya acquired a Master of Public Administration in 2010.

Woboya also holds an administrative law certificate (2003) from the Law Development Centre and a post graduate diploma (2005) in public administration and management from Islamic University in Uganda (IUIU).

== Career ==
Woboya started his post academic career as a research assistant in early 1997 at the Planning and Development Department of Makerere University where he partook in a two-month research opportunity. Later on that year, he joined Mbale District Local Government as a Sub-county/Gombolola Chief at the time when Uganda was transitioning from a centralized system of government to a decentralized one and served in that capacity for two years.

He was then promoted to Assistant CAO in 1999 there by cementing his role as a permanent civil servant. In 2000, when Sironko became a district, Woboya was transferred to the newly founded district where he served in the same capacity until 2004 when he joined the Ministry of Public Service as Senior Assistant Secretary to the Minister of State for Public service.

In 2005, Woboya joined the Office of the Prime Minister (OPM) and served as a Senior Assistant Secretary to the First Deputy Prime Minister. By 2010, he had served in that capacity as the P.A. to General Moses Ali and Professor Kabwegyere. In 2011, Woboya was appointed Principal Disaster Management Officer in the Office of the Prime Minister, a position he held until 2015 when he resigned to join elective politics.

In 2016, after winning the NRM chairmanship for Budadiri County East, Woboya won his maiden election on the NRM party ticket and became a member of the 10th Parliament for the Pearl of Africa.

== See also ==
- Sironko District
- Budadiri
