= Gerald Nangoli =

Ugandan politician

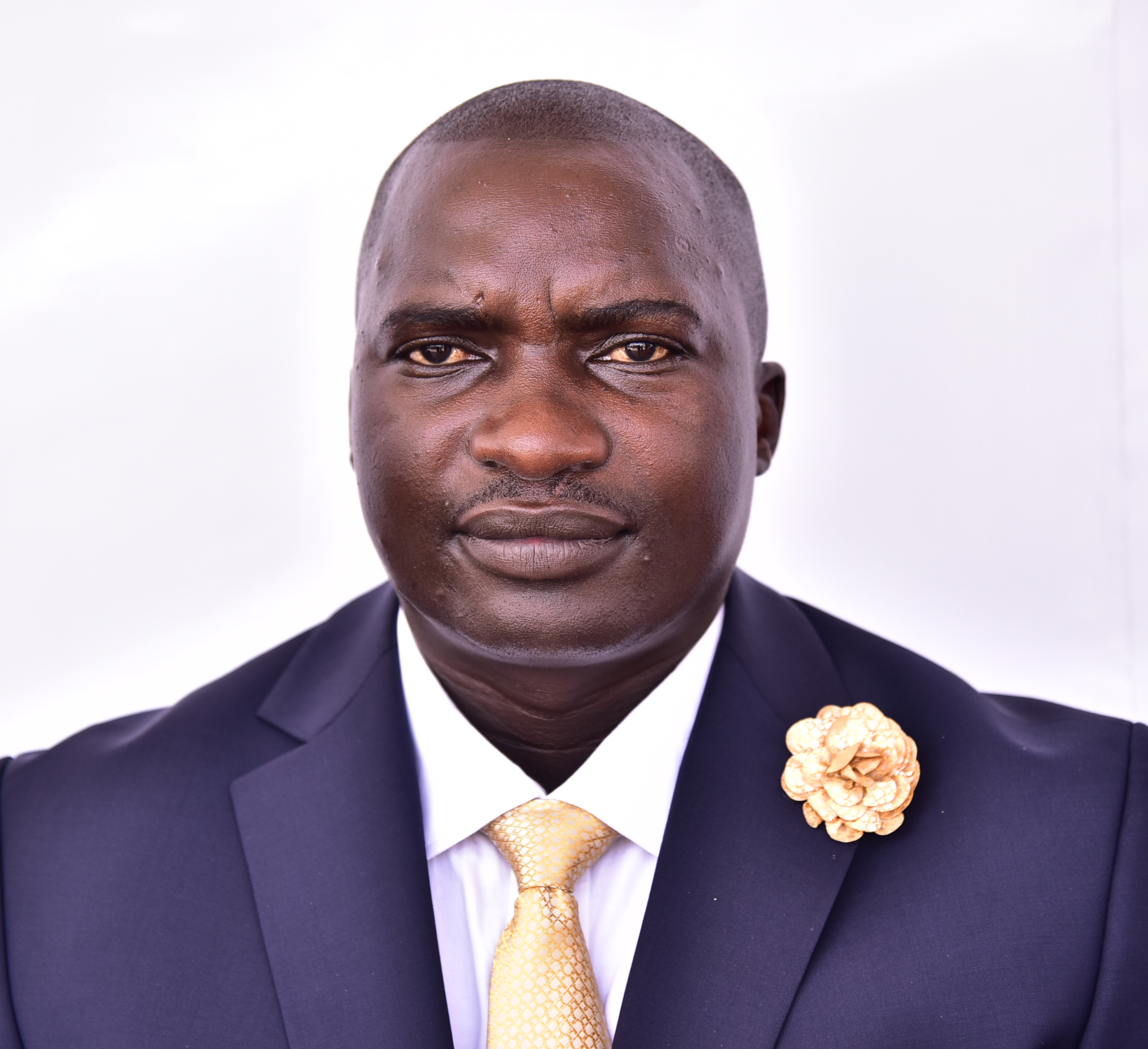

Member of Parliament for Elgon North County
- Incumbent
- Assumed office 2021

Personal details
- Party: National Resistance Movement (NRM)
- Occupation: Politician
- Known for: Member of Parliament for Elgon North County
- Committees: Committee on Finance, Planning and Economic Development

Gerald Nangoli is a Ugandan legislator and member of parliament for Elgon North County in Bulambuli District in the eleventh Parliament of Uganda. He is affiliated to the National Resistance Movement (NRM). In the 11th Parliament, Nangoli serves on the Committee on Finance, Planning and Economic Development.

== Political career ==
He was unopposed in the NRM primaries to become the flag-bearer, contest as Member of Parliament for Elgon North County. Nangoli won the 2021 elections and she became the member of parliament for Elgon North County in Bulambuli District with the majority number of votes. Nangoli sits on the Committee on Finance, Planning and Economic Development in the eleventh Parliament of Uganda which is chaired by Dr. Keefa Kiwanuka. He is the elected Vice chairperson of NRM in Bulambuli (2026 - 2031) after defeating Mark Baaza who was the incumbent.

He is also noted as the Vice Chairperson of the Bugisu Parliamentary Caucus a bloc of MPs representing the Bugisu sub-region.

== Parliamentary Activities and Contribution ==
=== Budget and Standards Oversight ===
As a member of the committee on Finance, Planning and Economic Development, he urged the Ministry of Finance to allocate funds to enable the Uganda National Bureau of Standards (UNBS) to destroy substandard goods that have been seized in market monitoring operations.

=== Land and Research Oversight ===
He contributed to a parliamentary report recommending that the Uganda Land Commission (ULC) work with the National Agricultural Research Organisation (NARO) to better utilize and manage government-held land.

=== Parish Development Model (PDM) Debate ===
Nangoli pressed government officials on delays in distributing Parish Development Model funds highlighting shortfalls and the impact on local agricultural planning.

=== Educational and Workforce Issues ===
He raised concerns over teacher salaries and disparities when science teachers are promoted to administrative roles, pointing to systemic challenges in education workforce management.

== Development Initiatives in Bulambuli ==
Nangoli has been involved in local infrastructure and community development projects in his constituency. Forexample, he advocated for metal staircases and safety improvements in the hilly Namisuni and Bufumbo areas of Bulambuli. A project estimated to cost billions of Ugandan shillings to improve community mobility and reduced risk to pregnant women and other residents who previously used unsafe wooden ladders.

== Other works ==
Nangoli has spoken out against corruption, abuse of office and embezzlement of public funds in the Elgon North County. He called upon the stake holders of the Emyooga funds to increase on sensitization so that people can gain more knowledge on how to benefit from Emyooga funds. He attended the commissioning of kaserem-kapchorwa-road. Nangoli went on a monitoring tour of schools in Bulambuli District to check on the state they were in and found out that most of the schools were not renovated due to lack of funds. He also provides oversight roles in national matters that need government attention.

== Personal Incidents ==
In May 2025, Gerald Nangoli was involved in a road accident along Trinity-Mbale Highway in Eastern Uganda when his vehicle was in a head-on collision while trying to overtake another car. He suffered minor injuries and no fatalities were reported.

== See also ==
- List of members of the eleventh Parliament of Uganda
- Irene Muloni
- Thomas Tayebwa
- Anita Among
- Jane Aceng
