= Kapchorwa General Hospital =

Ugandan public hospital

- Uganda Ministry of Health

Geography
- Location: Kapchorwa, Kapchorwa District, Eastern Region, Uganda
- Coordinates: 01°23′55″N 34°26′50″E

Organisation
- Care system: Public
- Type: General

Services
- Emergency department: I
- Beds: 150

History
- Founded: 1962

Links
- Other links: Hospitals in Uganda

Kapchorwa General Hospital, also Kapchorwa Hospital, is a public hospital in the Eastern Region of Uganda.

== Location ==
The hospital is located in the town of Kapchorwa, in Kapchorwa District, about 66 kilometres (41 mi) northeast of Mbale Regional Referral Hospital. The coordinates of Kapchorwa General Hospital are 01°23'55.0"N, 34°26'50.0"E (Latitude:1.389625; Longitude:34.447207).

== Overview ==
Kapchorwa General Hospital was established in 1962. It has a bed capacity of 150. The hospital serves a catchment population estimated at 104,580 as of 2016. The patients come from the districts of Kapchorwa, Bukwo, Kween and Sironko. The hospital is congested and understaffed.

In 2015, the Government of Uganda began partial rehabilitation of the hospital, beginning with: 1. Renovation of the operating theatre (operating room) 2. Procurement of new operating table 3. Procurement of new theatre operating lamp 4. Reconstruction of the TB ward 5. Renovation of the maternity ward 6. Rehabilitation of the drainage system 7. Installation of solar panels on the operating theatre 8. Installation of solar panels on maternity ward and 9. Installation of solar panels on children's ward.

That same year, competitive bidding was advertised for the construction of new staff houses at Kapchorwa General Hospital.

== Recent developments ==
By 2020, the hospital's catchment population had increased to an estimated 900,000 people from the four Ugandan districts mentioned before, plus patients from the following additional districts: Bulambuli, Bukedea and the Karamoja sub-region. In addition, patients are received from the Kenyan counties of Trans-Nzoia and West Pokot.

In September 2020, following over 50 staff members at the hospital testing positive for COVID-19, the hospital was closed down for two weeks. After mitigation measures had been instituted, the hospital was re-opened in early October 2020.

== See also ==
- List of hospitals in Uganda
