= Nakaloke =

- Location in Uganda
- Coordinates: 01°08′00″N 34°08′00″E
- Country: Uganda
- Region: Eastern Region
- Sub-region: Bugisu sub-region
- District: Sironko District
- Elevation: 1,276 m (4,186 ft)
- Time zone: UTC+3 (EAT)

Nakaloke is a town in Sironko District in the Eastern Region of Uganda.

== See also ==
- Amuria
- Arapai
- Atutur Town
- Mutufu
