= Mbale–Bulambuli–Siti Medium Voltage Power Line =

Medium voltage power line in Uganda

Location
- Country: Uganda
- Coordinates: 01°09′36″N 34°23′48″E
- General direction: South to North
- From: Mbale, Uganda
- Passes through: Bulambuli
- To: Siti, Uganda

Ownership information
- Owner: Government of Uganda
- Operator: Umeme Limited

Construction information
- Construction started: 2017
- Expected: Commissioning 2020

Technical information
- Current type: AC
- Total length: 125 km (78 mi)
- AC voltage: 33kV
- No. of circuits: 2

The Mbale–Bulambuli–Siti Medium Voltage Power Line is a medium voltage electricity power line (33kV), under construction, connecting the medium voltage substation at Siti II Hydroelectric Power Station in Bukwo District, in the Eastern Region of Uganda, to another medium voltage substation in the city of Mbale, the largest urban centre in Uganda's Eastern Region.

== Location ==
The 33 kilo Volt power line starts at the Umeme Limited (Umeme) 33kV substation at Mbale, Mbale District, in Uganda's Eastern Region. The power line travels in a general north-easterly direction to the town of Bulambuli, in Bulambuli District, a distance of about 56 kilometres (35 mi). From there, the power line takes a general easterly direction to end at Siti II Hydroelectric Power Station, a distance of about 101 kilometres (63 mi), by road from Bulambuli. Due to the steep terrain, the power line does not always follow the winding road. The line measures only 125 kilometres (78 mi), from Mbale to Siti II Power Station.

== Overview ==
The power line is being developed to evacuate the 16.5 megawatts of electricity generated at Siti II Hydroelectric Power Station and transmit it to Mbale where it will be distributed to industrial, commercial and domestic customers. Siti II Power Station is expected online in the 3rd quarter of 2020.

The metropolis of Mbale attained city status on 1 July 2020. Before that, their electricity consumption was no more than 20 megawatts. In 2019, peak demand in Mbale increased by 5 percent. This transmission line together with other distribution enhancements within the city, will result in the availability of 61 megawatts of electricity by December 2020.

== Associated power infrastructure ==
As part of this power line, Umeme is also installing a switching station and plant house at its existing Mbale substation. In addition, it is installing capacitor banks, aimed at stabilizing the power supply.

Another large infrastructure development in Mbale is the creation of Tangshan Mbale Industrial Park. The park, which sits on 619 acres (251 ha), will host 60 to 80 factories when fully developed. Its peak consumption is calculated at 220 megawatts of electricity at full capacity. Umeme is construction a 33 kilo Volt transmission line, measuring 75 kilometres (47 mi) long, from Tororo to Tangshan Mbale Industrial Park, delivering 25 megawatts of electricity. Umeme is also constructing a switching station and plant house within the industrial park, to stabilize the electricity to industrial standards. The electricity distributor utility is also constructing a distribution network within the park measuring 10 kilometres (6 mi).

At a later date, Uganda Electricity Transmission Company Limited (UETCL) plans to develop the 132kV Mbale–Bulambuli High Voltage Power Line, at which time the 33kV medium voltage line will plug into the high voltage line, for better stability of the network.

== Cost and construction ==
The power line and associated infrastructure developments are budgeted at US$9.23 million (UShs34 billion). Construction started in June 2019 and is expected to conclude in August 2020. The Tangshan Mbale Industrial Park Project will cost US$5.99 million (UShs22 billion). Work started in May 2020, with completion expected in December 2020. Funding is provided 100 percent by Umeme Limited.

== See also ==
- Energy in Uganda
- List of power stations in Uganda
