= Muyembe =

- Location in Uganda
- Coordinates: 01°18′21″N 34°17′21″E
- Country: Uganda
- Region: Eastern Uganda
- Sub-region: Bugisu sub-region
- District: Sironko District
- Elevation: 3,996 ft (1,218 m)

Muyembe is a town in the Eastern Region of Uganda.

== Location ==
Muyembe is in Bulambuli District, approximately 22 kilometres (14 mi), by road, south of Bulambuli, where the district headquarters are located. Muyembe is approximately 35 kilometres (22 mi), by road, northeast of Mbale, the nearest large city and the largest urban area in eastern Uganda. This location is approximately 262 kilometres (163 mi), northeast of Kampala, Uganda's capital and largest city. The coordinates of Muyembe are 1°18'21.0"N, 34°17'210"E (Latitude:1.305833; Longitude:34.289172). The average elevation of Muyembe is about 1,218 metres (3,996 ft) above sea level.

== Overview ==
Muyembe lies on the main road between Mbale, (2014 pop. 96,189), the largest town in Eastern Uganda and Moroto, (2014 pop. 14,818), the largest town in Karamoja sub-region. At Muyembe, the tarmacked Mbale–Muyembe Road, meets the gravel-surfaced Muyembe–Nakapiripirit Road. Arrangements are underway to improve the un-tarmacked road to class II bitumen surface with drainage channels and culverts.

== See also ==
- Gisu people
- Mount Elgon
- Mount Elgon National Park
