= Dani Wadada Nabudere =

Ugandan lawyer, politician and academic (1932 – 2011)

Dani Nabudere

East Africa Railways and Harbours chairman
- In office 1971–1974

Ministry of Justice and Constitutional Affairs (Uganda)
- In office 1979–1979

Minister of Culture, Community Development, and Rehabilitation of Uganda
- In office 1979–1980

Personal details
- Born: December 15, 1932 Budadiri, Uganda
- Died: November 9, 2011 (aged 78) Mbale, Uganda
- Resting place: Bumayamba village, Buyobo, Budadiri, Uganda
- Profession: Political scientist, barrister

Dani Wadada Nabudere (15 December 1932 – 9 November 2011) was a Ugandan academic, Pan-Africanist, lawyer, politician, author, political scientist, and development specialist. At the time of his death, he was a professor at the Islamic University and executive director of the Marcus Garvey Pan-Afrikan Institute, Mbale, Uganda.

His political, intellectual and community work spanned over half a century of public activism. He was a speaker, mobilizer, and a prolific writer. Among his issues of engagement were food security, peace, knowledge heritages, Africa's contribution to humanizing the world, lifelong learning, cross-border solidarities, international political economy, Pan-Africanism, defense of the commons, cognitive justice, community sites of knowledge, restorative governance, economy, and justice.

Professor Nabudere was Minister of Justice of Uganda in 1979 and Minister of Culture, Community Development, and Rehabilitation of Uganda in 1979–1980 in the UNLF Interim Government of Uganda. He was an early President of the African Association of Political Science and vice-president of the International Political Science Association (IPSA) from 1985 to 1988. He was the founder and principal of the Marcus Garvey Pan-Afrikan Institute (MPAI), Mbale, Uganda. Over the last ten years of his life, Nabudere was working on setting up grassroots organizations to assist rural communities and raise their voices over issues that concern their lives.

== Early life and education ==
Dani Wadada Nabudere was born on 15 December 1932, in Budadiri, Uganda, into a family of Bumayamba village, Buyobo.

Nabudere attended school in Bugisu and then graduated from Aggrey Memorial College, Bunamwaya. He became a postal clerk for several years, before applying to study law in the United Kingdom. In the early 1960s he traveled to England to study law, and received a Bachelor of Laws Degree in 1963, and was admitted as a Barrister at Law, at Lincoln's Inn, London.

== Career ==
=== In Ugandan Independence movement ===
Nabudere stepped onto the national political scene in the 1960s. As a student in London in 1961, he was a member of the executive committee of the United Kingdom Uganda Students Association together with Yash Tandon, Ateker Ejalu, Chango Machyo, and Edward Rugumayo, who were all later to play a significant role in the history of Uganda. UGASA was engaged in helping to raise the political consciousness of young Ugandans studying or working in the UK and in Europe. One of the main activities of the organization was to lobby British parliamentarians for Uganda's independence.

=== Activism under the Obote government ===
When he returned from the UK in 1964, he quickly began to fall out of favor with the Uganda People's Congress. The UPC was a radical nationalist party. Its then Secretary-General, John Kakonge, had broad communist leanings, and had a strong following among the youth wing of the party, among them, Nabudere. At the Gulu Conference of the party in 1964, the left wing was outmaneuvered by Milton Obote and the party mainstream leadership.

He was also, a Marxist socialist when the UPC government at the time was opposed to communism. In 1965 he was expelled from the party together with Kirunda Kivejinja, Jaberi Bidandi-Ssali, and Kintu Musoke. However, even after expulsion from the UPC, Nabudere remained an opponent of the Obote wing with radical stances. Around the same time, Nabudere and Raiti Omongin had just formed the first Maoist Party in Uganda. During this period Nabudere had also played a critical role in the unification talks between Zanzibar and Tanganyika.

When Obote abolished political parties and declared a one-party state in 1969, Nabudere fell victim to his continued party activism. Nabudere had earlier in 1963 formed a Mbale-based activists' group called the Uganda Vietnam Solidarity Committee to campaign against American imperialism and aggression in Vietnam.

In September 1965, Nabudere was accused by a member of the Ugandan Parliament of organizing a "communist plot" to overthrow the government. In December 1969, following an attempt on Obote's life at a UPC congress Nabudere (among others) was arrested and placed in detention under the Emergency Laws. He was released in late November 1970.

=== Under Idi Amin government ===
When Idi Amin took power in January 1971, a number of Ugandans on the left decided to work with the Amin government, but they were soon disillusioned, and beginning with Rugumayo a number of them resigned from government in 1972. Nabudere was appointed by Idi Amin in 1971 as the East Africa Railways and Harbours chairman based in Nairobi, Kenya, but in 1974 protesting Amin's brutality he resigned and moved to Tanzania where he became one of the leaders of the anti-Amin resistance movement.

=== 1970s: Dar Es Salaam Exile & The Debate ===
As an academic, Nabudere was pivotal in at least three politically and pedagogically significant debates at the University of Dar es Salaam in the late 1960s and the decade of the 1970s. These academic and popular debates were followed closely at the time, and were formative in an era of newly independent African states, where political leaders like Julius Nyerere, Kwame Nkrumah, or Sekou Touré, and academics like Nabudere, Mamdani, or Cheikh Anta Diop were all wrestling with advancing either particular forms of African Socialism, Marxism, Pan-African ideologies, or adapting western Development theory to African contexts.

The first was about Tanzania, the direction it was going and how it might show the way for the rest of Africa towards the ultimate goal of socialism. It was mainly a debate among the Tanzanian radicals, sometimes joined in by others from outside Tanzania such as Walter Rodney and Nabudere.

The second was a debate mainly among the African members of the teaching staff of the university, in particular in the Faculty of Social Sciences, on how the prevailing pedagogy of their disciplines might be challenged and changed to reflect the African context and conditions.

The third was a debate among primarily the Ugandans on "the Hill" as Makerere University was called, and those living in exile in East Africa occasionally joined by others even outside East Africa. It was partly inspired by Nabudere's book 'Imperialism and Revolution in Uganda' (1980) and its critique by Mahmood Mamdani, Harkishan Bhagat, and Karim Hirji. Later these discussions were reproduced as a book called 'The Dar es Salaam Debate on Class, State and Imperialism' (1982), which was edited by Yash Tandon, with a foreword by Mohammad Babu, the well-known Marxist revolutionary from Zanzibar. ‘The Debate’ had intellectual, pedagogical and also political and strategic value for Uganda but also Africa and the third world. The significance of this debate, latent when it was taking place, became clear in the early months of 1979, as those same very issues took on a practical political salience after Amin's invasion of Tanzania in December 1978. Tanzania repulsed the invasion but then President of Tanzania Julius Nyerere faced a dilemma. Should he proceed to Kampala, with his army thus effectively becoming an "occupation force", or should he try to forge a united Ugandan political front to take over the reins of government? He opted for the latter. But to forge unity of contending forces from Uganda proved a nightmare.

=== The Gang of Four and the Ugandan National Liberation Front ===
In his recount of the period of the Uganda National Liberation Front (UNLF), the political organization around which Ugandan exiles united to topple Amin, Prof. Edward Rugumayo, who became chairman of UNLF's ruling council, says Nabudere played a central part in the formation of the liberation group. When the UNLF was established and a ruling body for it formed known as the National Consultative Council (NCC), Nabudere was elected chairman of its political and diplomatic committee. He became a key leader in the NCC, alongside Edward Rugumayo, Yash Tandon, and Omwony Ojwok. They were collectively known as 'the Gang of Four', a reference to the Chinese Communist ruling faction called the Gang of Four of the Chinese Cultural Revolution.

Under the UNLF interim government, Nabudere was twice appointed government minister: in 1979 he was Minister of Justice and from 1979 to 1980, Minister of Culture, Community Development and Rehabilitation.

The first administration of the UNLF government under President Yusuf Lule lasted only six-eight days. In September 1979 he was ousted from power by a vote of no confidence moved in the transitional parliament, the NCC chaired by Edward Rugumayo, if democratically removed, and replaced by President Godfrey Binaisa. It was the Binaisa administration that was then removed from power by the Military Commission of the UNLF led by Paulo Muwanga and Yoweri Museveni, and probably backed by Tanzania.

=== The 1980s and post-NRM era ===
The 12 May 1980 army coup that overthrew Binaisa and placed Paulo Muwanga in power, Nabudere fled to exile, as did the other three members of the 'gang of four'.

In 1982 Nabudere moved to Helsingør in Denmark, teaching at a Folk High School. This was one of his most productive years as a scholar. He wrote the over 300-page manuscript called 'The Rise and Fall of Money Capital', which was published in 1990 under an organization called Africa in Transition, an organization founded by brothers Yash Tandon and Vikash Tandon. An analysis of money revising Marx, Engels, Hilferding, Rosa Luxemburg, and Keynes, all of whom came under Nabudere's critique. Nabudere carried out a historical analysis of the rise of money as money (as distinct from its evolution as capital), and made the prediction that money will eventually overcome capital and then meet its own demise as an instrument of credit. This is what in fact happened in the first decade of the 21st century, what came to be known in our own times as "financialization of capital". Nabudere had already anticipated this during his period of research and writing in Helsingør. Later, a summary of the book was published by Fahamu, titled, 'The Crash of International Finance-Capital and Its Implications for the Third World' (2009), to which Yash Tandon wrote a foreword.

Nabudere lived in exile until 1993 when President Museveni invited him back to the country to be part of the Constituent Assembly (CA).

Upon Nabudere's return, he became a very outspoken critic of Museveni. Over the course of the CA, Nabudere many times led members of the Assembly on walkouts when they disagreed with the other CA members. He also joined with Aggrey Awori to form the National Caucus for Democracy (NCD), a CA-based pressure group.

== The MPAI and Afrikology ==
Nabudere founded the Marcus Garvey Pan-Afrikan Institute (MPAI) in Mbale, Uganda, the objective of which was to create a repository of knowledge on African science, philosophy, medicine and other indigenous African knowledge which he called "Afrikology". MPAI was later to evolve into a university, of which he was the first Chancellor-Designate.

== Death ==
After suffering from diabetes and high blood pressure, Nabudere died at his home in the early hours of 9 November 2011. He was survived by his wife and son among others.

== Notable publications ==
=== Books ===
- The Political Economy of Imperialism, 1976, Tanzania Publishing House and Zed Press, London;
- Essays on the theory and practice of Imperialism, 1979, Onyx Press, London;
- Imperialism in East Africa, 1980, Zed Press, London (in two volumes);
- Imperialism and Revolution in Uganda, 1980, Onyx Press, London;
- The Crash of International Finance Capital and its implications for the Third World, SAPES Trust, 1989, Harare, Zimbabwe;
- Democracy and the One-Party State in Africa, Institut Für Afrika Kunde, Hamburg, Germany, 1989; Co-edited with P. Meynes;
- The Rise and Fall of Money Capital, 1990, Afrika in Trust, Harare/London;
- Uganda Referendum 2000: Winners and Losers, Monitor Publications, Kampala;
- Pan-Africanism and Integration in Africa, 2002, SAPES Publications, Harare, Zimbabwe, co-edited with Ibbo Mandaza;
- The Global Capitalist Crisis and the Way Forward for Africa, Kampala, 2009.
- The Crash of International Finance Capital and its implications for the Third World, Republished by Ufahamu, London, 2009.
- Afrikology, Philosophy, and Wholeness: An Epistemology, Africa Institute of South Africa, PRETORIA, February 2011.

=== Other Selected writings ===
- Government should be clear on Obote
- Development theories, knowledge production and emancipatory practice Chapter in 'The development decade? economic and social change in South Africa, 1994–2004', Vishnu Padayachee,
- The Crash of International Finance-Capital and its Implications for the Third World
- Brave Faces Won't Resolve New Crisis
