= Atutur =

Atutur may refer to any of the following

- Atutur Town, a town in Kumi District, in the Eastern Region of Uganda
- Atutur sub-county, a sub-county in Kumi District, Uganda
- Atutur Parish, a parish in Atutur sub-county, Kumi District, Uganda
- Atutur Sub-County Sacco, a cooperative savings society in Atutur sub-county
- Atutur General Hospital, a 100-bed, government-owned hospital in Atutur sub-county.
