= 2026 Kapchorwa bus accident =

July 2026 school bus crash in Kapchorwa District, Uganda

Details
- Date: July 16, 2026 c. 20:00 EAT (17:00 UTC)
- Location: Chekwatit Village, Kawowo Sub-county, Kapchorwa District, Uganda
- Operator: King David Junior School
- Cause: Vehicle mechanical failure leading to loss of control

Statistics
- Vehicles: Isuzu bus (Reg. UA 108BQ)
- Deaths: 24 (23 pupils, 1 adult)
- Injured: 20+

The 2026 Kapchorwa bus accident occurred on the evening of 16 July 2026 in Kapchorwa District, eastern Uganda, when an Isuzu school bus carrying primary school pupils veered off the road and overturned while descending Chekwatit Hill. The vehicle was transporting pupils and staff from King David Junior School who were returning to Kampala from an educational trip at Sipi Falls. The crash resulted in 24 fatalities and left many injured.

== Background ==
King David Junior School, a private elementary school based in Ndejje, Makindye-Ssabagabo, organized a bus educational field trip for its pupils to visit Sipi Falls, a scenic waterfall and popular tourist attraction situated on the slopes of Mount Elgon in Eastern Uganda. Four buses were dispatched to transport learners and teachers for the excursion.

Chekwatit Hill, located in the Kawowo area of Kapchorwa, is recognized locally as a hazardous road section with a history of severe vehicle crashes.

== Accident ==
At approximately 20:00 EAT (17:00 UTC) on 16 July 2026, one of the four school buses (an Isuzu, registration number UA 108BQ) was descending Chekwatit Hill in Chekwatit Village, Kimawa Parish, Kawowo Sub-county. According to eyewitnesses and preliminary police findings, the bus experienced a mechanical failure while navigating the steep gradient. The driver lost control of the vehicle, causing it to veer off the road, collide with a large roadside boulder, and capsize. The impact severely compromised the structure of the bus, tearing off the roof section and exposing the passenger seating.

Local residents from Chekwatit Village were the first responders, assisting trapped passengers and transporting injured pupils to nearby medical facilities using private trucks and light utility vehicles prior to the arrival of emergency medical services.

== Casualties ==
Twenty pupils and one adult died at the scene or shortly after arriving at local medical facilities. The adult fatality was confirmed to be Tadeo Ssekade, the founder and director of King David Junior School. Over subsequent days, three additional pupils succumbed to their injuries while undergoing treatment at Kapchorwa General Hospital, bringing the total death toll to 24.Dozens of pupils and several staff members suffered varying degrees of trauma and fractures, with at least nine children initially admitted in critical condition.

== Aftermath and responses ==
=== Government response ===
In response to the incident, the Ministry of Education and Sports issued an immediate nationwide suspension of all school study tours and field trips pending a comprehensive safety audit and regulatory review. Acting Education Minister Dr. John Chrysostom Muyingo announced the suspension while visiting King David Junior School in Ndejje, where parents and community members had gathered following news of the disaster.

The Ministry of Local Government, led by State Minister Balaam Barugahara Ateenyi, coordinated emergency assistance for the families of the victims and oversaw medical evacuation efforts for critically injured survivors. Police forces were directed to escort the remaining returning school buses across the country to prevent secondary incidents.

=== Investigation ===
The Uganda Police Force and the Traffic and Road Safety Directorate launched a joint investigation into the crash. Preliminary reports from the Sipi Region Police pointed to mechanical failure, specifically brake failure, as the primary contributing factor. Authorities also investigated reports that the vehicle had experienced multiple minor mechanical issues and made several unscheduled stops earlier in the trip before attempting the steep descent at Chekwatit Hill.

== See also ==
- Transport in Uganda
