= Tegeres =

Subcounty in Kapchorwa District, Uganda

- Subcounty
- Tegeres Subcounty
- Interactive map of Tegeres
- Country: Uganda
- Region: Eastern Region
- District: Kapchorwa District
- County: Tingey County

Population (2014 census)
  - Total: 8,984
  - Households (2014): 1,768
  - Average household size (2014): 5.1
- Time zone: UTC+3 (EAT)

Tegeres is a subcounty in Tingey County, Kapchorwa District, in the Eastern Region of Uganda. In the 2014 national census reporting tables, Uganda Bureau of Statistics (UBOS) recorded 1,768 households and a population of 8,984 in Tegeres Subcounty.

It is the home subcounty of Stephen Kiprotich, men's marathon gold medalist at the 2012 Olympic Games in London.

Location of Tegeres in Uganda

Subsistence agriculture is the main economic activity in Kapchorwa District. Crops grown include Millet, Potatoes, Beans, Simsim, Sunflower, Cotton, Coffee, Wheat, Tomatoes, Cabbage, Passion fruit, Onions.

Animal husbandry is practised; the livestock domesticated are mainly cattle, goats, rabbits and chickens

It consists of 7 parishes, 51 villages. The parishes are Kabat, Kapenguria, Kapteret, Kutung, Kapnyikew, Tegeres, Tuban.

== Location ==
Tegeres lies within Kapchorwa District, part of the Sebei sub-region in eastern Uganda.

Kapchorwa Municipality is the district’s main urban local government unit. CityPopulation (compiled from UBOS census outputs) reports the municipality’s 2024 population and its divisions (Central, East, and West).

== Administration ==
Tegeres is listed as a subcounty under Tingey County in Kapchorwa District in administrative boundary datasets.

Kapchorwa District Local Government reports district-wide local administrative counts (parishes or wards, and villages or cells) on its official website.

== Demographics ==
UBOS (2014 census reporting tables) recorded the following for Tegeres Subcounty: 1,768 households, average household size 5.1, 4,374 males, 4,610 females, total population 8,984.

UBOS 2014 census reporting table figures for Tegeres Subcounty
Indicator	Value
Households (2014)	1,768
Average household size (2014)	5.1
Male population (2014)	4,374
Female population (2014)	4,610
Total population (2014)	8,984

== Services ==
Kapchorwa Municipal Council public reporting for FY 2023/2024 referenced facilities named Tegeres Primary School and Tegeres Health Centre III in service delivery updates.

== Notable people ==
Stephen Kiprotich, Uganda’s men’s marathon gold medallist at the 2012 London Olympics, is reported to come from Cheptilyal village in Tegeres Subcounty, Kapchorwa District.

== See also ==
- Kapchorwa District
- Kapchorwa
- Mount Elgon
- Stephen Kiprotich
