= Binyiny =

- Map of Uganda showing the location of Binyiny.
- Coordinates: 01°25′03″N 34°32′04″E
- District: Kween District
- Elevation: 1,900 m (6,200 ft)
- Time zone: UTC+3 (EAT)

Binyiny is a town in Eastern Uganda. It is the largest town in Kween District and the headquarters of the district are located in the town. Kween District is one of the 23 new Ugandan districts, created in 2010. Prior to July 2010, the district was part of Kapchorwa District.

== Location ==
Binyiny is located approximately 70 kilometres (43 mi), by road, northeast of Mbale, the nearest large city. This location lies approximately 5 kilometres (3.1 mi), east of Kapchorwa, the largest town in the sub-region. The coordinates of the town are:1°25'03.0"N, 34°32'04.0"E (Latitude:1.417500; Longitude:34.534445).

== Points of interest ==
Te following points of interest are located within the town, or near its borders:

- The headquarters of Kween District Administration
- The offices of Binyiny Town Council
- Binyiny Central Market

== See also ==
- Sebei
- Kapchorwa
- Mbale
- Kween District
