= Siti Hydroelectric Power Station =

Siti Hydroelectric Power Station may refer to one of the following:

- Siti I Hydroelectric Power Station, a 5.0 megawatts (6,700 hp) hydroelectric power station in Uganda
- Siti II Hydroelectric Power Station, a 16.5 megawatts (22,100 hp) hydroelectric power station in Uganda
