= Siti =

Siti or SITI may also refer to:

== People ==
- Siti (given name), a common female given name of Arabic origin.
- Siti Kassim (born 1961), Comorian politician
- Siti Mwinyi (born 1932), Tanzanian first lady
- Beáta Siti (born 1973), Hungarian handball player and coach
- Eszter Siti (born 1977), Hungarian handball player
- Walid Siti (born 1952), Kurdish artist
- Siti Badriah (born 1991), musical artist Dancedhut at the Productions Nagaswara
- Siti Nurhaliza (born 1979), Malaysian singer and actress
- Siti Saerah (1928–2013), Bruneian royalty
- Siti (king), ruler of Makuria

== Places ==
- Siti Hydroelectric Power Station (disambiguation)

== Other ==
- Siti, character in Opera Jawa
- SITI Company, theater company in New York, United States
- SITI: An Iconic Exhibition of Dato' Siti Nurhaliza
- Siti (film), 2014 Indonesian film
- Siti Networks, Indian cable television company
- Siti language, Gurunsi language of Ghana, in the Niger-Congo family
- Spectrum Information Technologies, Inc., a defunct American telecommunications company
- Stevens Institute of Technology International, former private university in Dominican Republic
