= Martin Khor =

Malaysian journalist and economist

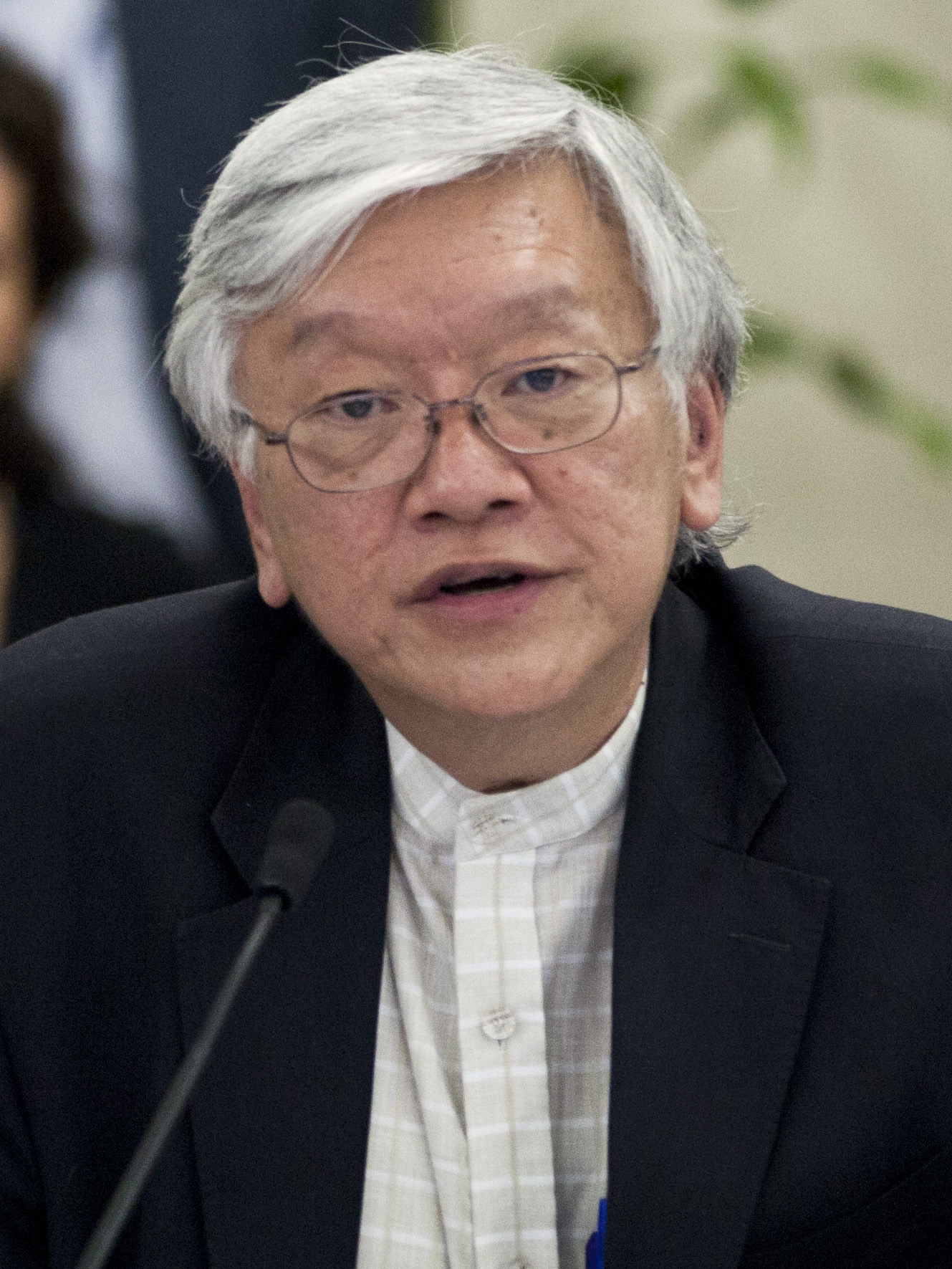
- Khor in 2013

Member of the UN Secretary General
- In office 1997 – April 1, 2020
- Succeeded by: pending

Executive Director of South Centre (organization)
- In office March 1, 2009 – July 1, 2018
- Preceded by: Yash Tandon
- Succeeded by: Carlos María Correa

Personal details
- Born: Martin Khor Kok Peng; November 9, 1951 Penang, Malaysia
- Died: April 1, 2020 (aged 68) Penang, Malaysia
- Cause of death: Complications of cancer
- Resting place: Mount Erskine
- Children: 1
- Education: Cambridge University; Universiti Sains of Malaysia

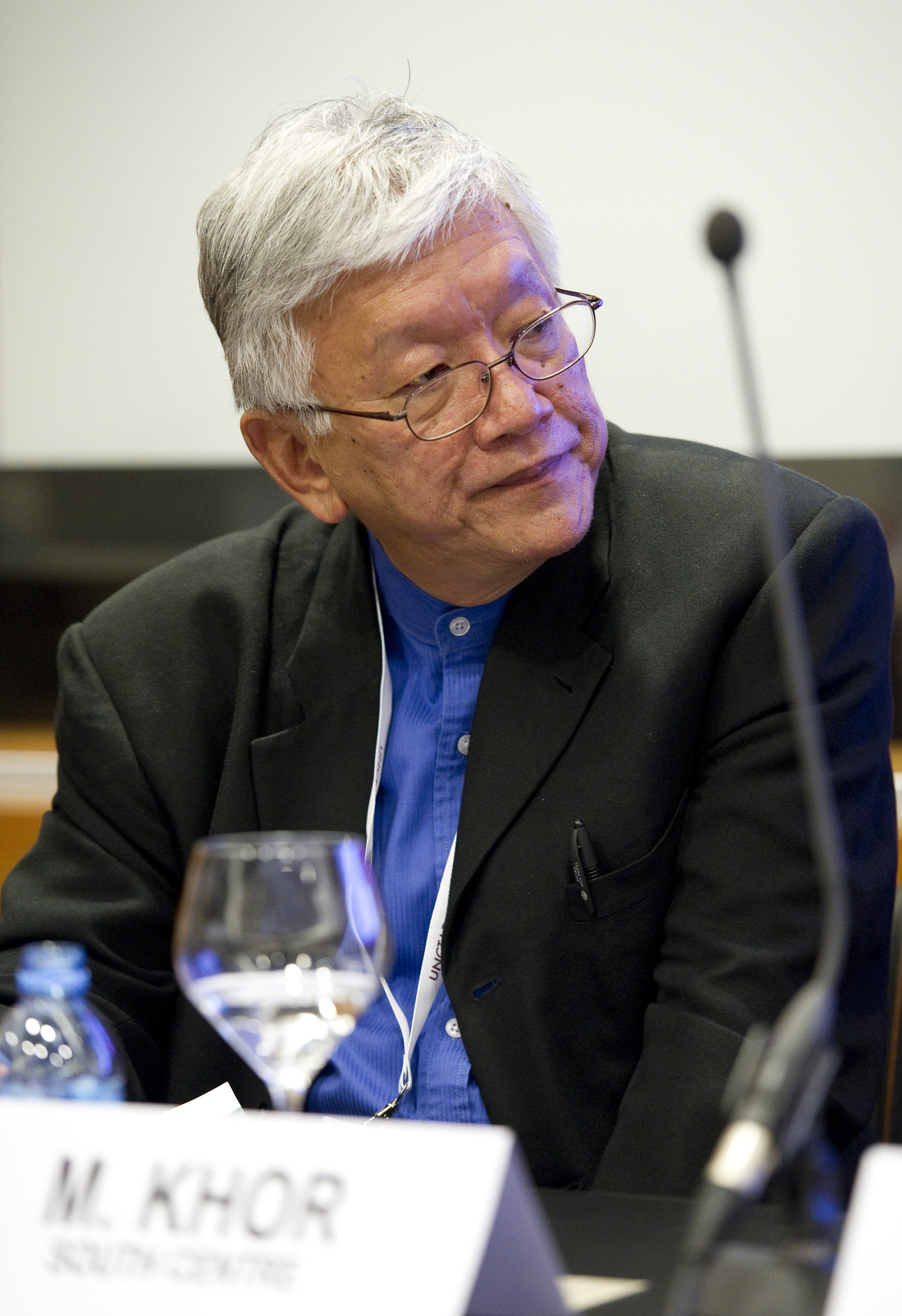
Martin Khor (2012)

Martin Khor Kok Peng (November 9, 1951 – 1 April 2020) was a Malaysian journalist and economist. He was the executive director of the South Centre, an intergovernmental organisation of developing countries based in Geneva, from 1 March 2009 to 2018. He replaced Dr. Yash Tandon who was the executive director of the South Centre from 2005 to 2009. Khor was also the Director of the Third World Network, which is based in Penang, Malaysia.

Khor was born in Penang, Malaysia. His father was journalist Khor Cheang Kee while his mother Margaret Hon was a history teacher. He was active in the civil society movement and attended the 1999 and 2000 World Economic Forum (WEF) in Davos, the World Social Forum (WSF 2002, 2003) and the European social forum (2004).

He was also, from 1997, a member of the UN Secretary-General's Task Force on Environment and Human Settlements, and a member of the Ministry of International Trade and Industry's National Committee on Multilateral Trade Issues in Malaysia. He was a vice-chair of the Working Group of Experts on the Right to Development under the UN Commission on Human Rights.

He also participated in the Helsinki Process on Globalisation and Democracy.

Khor sat on the board of directors of the International Forum on Globalization.

Khor was also a long-standing columnist for The Star newspaper from 1978 to 2019.

He was trained as an economist at the University of Cambridge and Universiti Sains of Malaysia.

== Illness and death ==
In 2015, Khor was diagnosed with cancer and returned to his hometown, Penang, to fight it. He succumbed to it on the 1st of April 2020. His wake was held at the Mount Erskine funeral parlour and his funeral was held the next day at the same location under Covid restrictions. He was survived by a wife and a daughter. Datuk Seri Mohamad Hasan paid tribute to him.

== Quotes ==
- about the WSF: "That is a new global relationship between countries that promote the weak rather than the strong"

WSF 2003

- about the patent system and intellectual property in general: "One of the solutions is finding ways to promote innovation and to reward good work without necessarily using the intellectual property system, because it may not be the right system to provide rewards all the time."

Scenarios for the future

== Selected works ==
- The Malaysian Experience in Financial-Economic Crisis Management: An Alternative to the IMF-Style Approach (2005) 983-2729-40-8 (Publisher: Third World Network)
- Global Trends Series (2001–2019) 978-1842770559 All articles on series from 2003-2019 on Third World Network (Publishers: Zed Books and Third World Network)
