= Siti II Hydroelectric Power Station =

- Map of Uganda showing the location of Siti II Power Station
- Country: Uganda
- Location: Chesowari
- Coordinates: 01°16′35″N 34°39′28″E
- Purpose: Power
- Status: Operational
- Construction began: August 2016

Dam and spillways
- Impounds: Siti River

Reservoir
- Normal elevation: 1,990 m (6,530 ft)

Power Station
- Commission date: H2 2018
- Type: Run-of-the-river
- Installed capacity: 16.5 MW (22,100 hp)

Siti II Hydroelectric Power Station is a 16.5 megawatts (22,100 hp), run of river, hydroelectric power station in the Eastern Region of Uganda.

== Location ==
The power station is located across River Siti, in Chesowari Village, Siti Parish, Bukwo District, along the northeastern slopes of Mount Elgon. It is immediately downstream of its sister power station, Siti I Hydroelectric Power Station. This location is approximately 16 kilometres (10 mi), by road, southwest of Bukwo Town Council, where the district headquarters are located. This is about 145 kilometres (90 mi), by road, northeast of Mbale, the largest city in Uganda's Eastern Region.

== Overview ==
The power station is a run of river, mini hydroelectric power installation, with capacity of 16.5 megawatts (22,100 hp). The development is owned by the developer who also owns and developed the 5.0 megawatts (6,700 hp) Siti I Hydroelectric Power Station.

The construction of this project started in August 2016, and commercial operations began in the second half of 2018. The power generated will be evacuated via the 33kV Mbale–Bulambuli–Siti Medium Voltage Power Line, that measures 125 kilometres (78 mi) in length. That power line is expected to be developed after Siti II has been commissioned. In the meantime, the Uganda Rural Electrification Agency is developing alternative temporary medium voltage evacuation solutions. In August 2020, Afik21.africa reported that Umeme, a privately owned electricity distribution company planned to spend US$9.29 million (USh:34 billion then) to build the 33kV double circuit transmission line to Mbale, where the energy will enter the national grid.

== Ownership ==
The owners of this project are "Elgon Hydro Siti Limited", a special vehicle company established specifically to develop, construct and operate Siti I (5MW) and Siti II (16.5MW) in Bukwo District, Eastern Uganda. Elgon Hydro is a subsidiary of "DI Frontier Market Energy and Carbon Fund K/S Fund", a Danish private equity fund.

== Funding ==
This project received a US$24 million loan, from FMO, of which 50 percent was sourced from Emerging Africa Infrastructure Fund (EAIF). The loan facility will be used for the construction of the Siti 2 hydro plant. FMO also financed the Siti I power station, constructed between March 2015 and May 2017.

== See also ==
- List of power stations in Uganda
