= Muyembe–Nakapiripirit Road =

Road in Uganda

Coordinates: 01°28′45″N 34°24′56″E

Route information
- Length: 92 mi (148 km)
- History: Designated in 2016; Construction started in 2021; Completion expected in 2023.

Major junctions
- South end: Muyembe
- North end: Nakapiripirit

Location
- Country: Uganda

Highway system
- Roads in Uganda

Muyembe–Nakapiripirit Road is a road in the Eastern and Northern regions of Uganda. The road connects the towns of Muyembe in Bulambuli District, to the town of Nakapiripirit in Nakapiripirit District.

== Location ==
The road starts at Muyembe, approximately 35 kilometres (22 mi) northeast of Mbale, the largest city in Eastern Uganda. The road continues north to end at Nakapiripirit, a total distance of approximately 95 kilometres (59 mi).

== Upgrade to bitumen ==
Plans are underway to upgrade this gravel road to class II bitumen surface with road width of 7 metres (23 ft), shoulders of 1.5 metres (4.9 ft), with drainage channels and culverts. In December 2014, this road was listed as "At project preparation".

In March 2015, the Ugandan Parliament authorized the borrowing of US$110 million, representing 86 percent of the cost, from the Islamic Development Bank (IDB). The government of Uganda will fund the remaining 14 percent, amounting to about US$18 million or local currency equivalent.

In December 2015, Uganda National Roads Authority advertised for construction companies to tender bids for the construction works, comprising 92 kilometres (57 mi) of main roads and an additional 25 kilometres (16 mi) of side roads and connectors, totaling 117 kilometres (73 mi). Following the evaluation of those bids, a preferred contractor will be selected and a construction contract will be executed between the parties concerned.

The construction contract was awarded to a Turkish construction company, Polat Yol Yapi Sanayi ve Ticaret A.S. On 7 November 2019, the construction contract was signed between UNRA, represented by Allen Kagina, the agency's executive director and Emre Polat, representing the contractor. Work is expected to start in 2021 and conclude in 2023. In November 2020, the New Vision newspaper reported that construction would begin in 2021 and last three years.

In March 2022, the Nile Post, a Ugandan online publication, reported that works were ongoing, but were behind schedule. Work which began on 30 March 2020, is contractually expected to end on 30 March 2023, and then followed by one year of "defects liability period".

== Financing ==
In November 2018, the Daily Monitor newspaper reported that the Islamic Development Bank (IsDB) had committed to lend US$114.12 million while the government of Uganda will contribute $18 million in counter-funding, of which US$5 million will go towards land compensation. Construction is expected to start in 2019 and last 3 years. In November 2019, it was reported that the Ugandan government had borrowed USh399 billion (US$109 million) from the IsDB to fund the upgrade of his road.

== See also ==
- Economy of Uganda
- List of roads in Uganda
