= Bukwo General Hospital =

- Uganda Ministry of Health

Geography
- Location: Bukwo, Bukwo District, Eastern Region, Uganda
- Coordinates: 01°17′39″N 34°45′19″E

Organisation
- Care system: Public
- Type: General

Services
- Emergency department: I
- Beds: 100

History
- Founded: 2010

Links
- Other links: Hospitals in Uganda

Bukwo General Hospital, also Bukwo District Hospital or Bukwo Hospital, is a hospital in the Eastern Region of Uganda.

== Location ==
The hospital is located on the Kapchorwa–Suam Road, in the town of Bukwo, approximately 134 kilometres (83 mi) northeast of Mbale Regional Referral Hospital. The coordinates of Bukwo Hospital are 1°17'39.0"N, 34°45'19.0"E (Latitude: 1.294158; Longitude: 34.755286).

== Overview ==
Bukwo General Hospital is a public hospital, funded by the Uganda Ministry of Health. General care in the hospital is free. It was built in the 2000s, with laying of the foundation stone in June 2010. The hospital is plagued by a lack of electricity and understaffing.

== Renovations ==
In 2013, the government of Uganda secured a loan from the World Bank to renovate certain Ugandan hospitals, including this hospital. The plans include the following:

- Construction of a new T-block building
- Construction of a new outpatient department
- Construction of an emergency room (casualty department)
- Construction of new administrative offices
- Construction of a house to accommodate the diesel generator
- Construction of a placenta disposal facility
- Construction of a medical waste disposal facility
- Construction of six new staff houses
- Construction of a laundry, kitchen, and dining room for patient attendants
- Construction of a new incinerator
- Construction of ventilated, improved pit latrines for use by patient attendants and outpatients

== See also ==
- List of hospitals in Uganda
