= Siti I Hydroelectric Power Station =

Hydroelectric power station in Uganda

- Country: Uganda
- Location: Siti, Bukwo District
- Coordinates: 01°15′00″N 34°38′13″E
- Status: Operational
- Commission date: May 2017

Power generation
- Units planned: 2 x 2.5 MW
- Nameplate capacity: 5.0 megawatts (6,700 hp)

Siti I Hydroelectric Power Station, commonly referred to as Siti Power Station, is a 5.0 megawatts (6,700 hp) mini hydropower station in Uganda.

== Location ==
The power station is located across River Siti, in Siti Parish, Bukwo District, in the northern part of Uganda's Eastern Region, near the International border with the Republic of Kenya. This location, lies on the northeastern slopes of Mount Elgon, within Mount Elgon National Park, at an altitude of about 2,000 metres (6,600 ft), above sea level. It is located in proximity to its sister power station, Siti II Hydroelectric Power Station

== Overview ==
The power station is a run of river, mini hydropower installation, with capacity of 5 Megawatts. The development was developed at the same time with the 16.5 megawatts (22,100 hp) Siti II Hydroelectric Power Station. Both are owned by the same developer. The impact assessment studies were done and presented prior to construction. One private developer, Elgon Hydro Siti Private, has applied for the development rights to the project. The 21.5 Megawatt power complex comprising Siti I and Siti II is the largest power generating installation in northeastern Uganda. The power generated from this power generating complex will supply the local communities in Bukwo District and the balance will be integrated into the national power grid.

== Construction timeline ==
In October 2014, the Electricity Regulatory Authority (ERA), licensed nine new renewable energy projects, including Siti I Hydroelectric Power Station. The power complex consists of two run of river generation units; Siti I with capacity of 5 Megawatts and Siti II, with capacity of 16.5 Megawatts. Construction started in March 2015, and commercial operations began in May 2017.

== See also ==
- Africa Dams
- Uganda Power Stations
