= Sironko =

Ugandan town

- Map of Uganda showing the location of Sironko.
- Coordinates: 01°13′50″N 34°14′53″E
- Country: Uganda
- Region: Eastern Region of Uganda
- Sub-region: Bugisu sub-region
- District: Sironko District
- Elevation: 1,184 m (3,885 ft)

Population (2019)
  - Total: 18,900
- Estimate
- Time zone: UTC+3 (EAT)

Sironko is the largest metropolitan area in Sironko District of the Eastern Region of Uganda and the site of the district headquarters.

== Geography ==
Sironko lies 25 kilometres (16 mi) northeast of the city of Mbale on the highway between Mbale and Moroto. It is located 245 kilometres (152 mi) northeast of Kampala, Uganda's capital and largest city. The coordinates of the town are 01°13'50.0"N, 34°14'53.0"E (Latitude:1.230556; Longitude:34.248056). Sironko sits at an average elevation of 1,184 metres (3,885 ft) above mean sea level.

== Overview ==
Sironko is the location of the headquarters of Sironko District, one of the six Ugandan districts in the Bugisu sub-region. The town is administered by Sironko Town Council, headed by a mayor. It is one of the only two town councils in the district, as of June 2020. The other town in the district is Budadiri Town.

Sironko town lies at the foothills of Mount Elgon. The area is prone to landslides and flooding. On more than one occasion, landslides have killed people and caused damage and loss of property in Sironko town and elsewhere in Sironko District.

== Population ==
The 1991 national census put the population of the town at 3,180 people. The 2002 census recorded the town population at 11,193. At the 2014 census, the town's population was 17,103. In 2019, the Uganda Bureau of Statistics (UBOS), estimated the mid-year population of the town at approximately 18,900 inhabitants. The table below gives the same data in tabular form.

Year	Population
1991 Census	3,180
2002 Census	11,193
2014 Census	17,103
2019 Estimate	18,900

== See also ==
- Bugisu sub-region
- Eastern Region
- List of cities and towns in Uganda
