= Local Council (Uganda) =

Form of local elected government within the districts of Uganda

A Local Council (LC) is a form of local elected government within the districts of Uganda.

== Background ==
Uganda has been holding elections consistently since the 1980s, at the different levels including Presidential, Parliamentary, District, and Local Councils. Local Councils are a concept around the lowest political-administrative unit based at the village level.

The District: A district is made up of several counties and any municipalities in that area. A district is led by an elected local council V (LCV) chairperson and his executive. There is also an elected LCV Council, with representatives from the sub-counties and technical staff in the district. The council debates budgets, decisions, and bylaws. On the technical side, the district is led by a Chief Administrative Officer (CAO), appointed by the central government. The district also has heads of various departments such as education, health, environment, and planning, which are responsible for relevant matters in the whole district. Currently, Uganda has about 121 districts that have grown from 30 districts in 1986.

The county: A county is made up of several sub-counties. Each county is represented at the national level in parliament in Kampala by an elected member of Parliament (an MP). In major towns, the equivalent of a county is a municipality (which is a set of divisions). LCIII executive committee members of all the sub-counties constitute the local council IV (LCIV). They then elect an LCIV executive committee from among themselves. These committees have limited powers, except in municipalities, which they run.

The sub-county: The sub-county is made up of a number of parishes and is run by the sub-county chief on the technical side and by an elected local council III (LCIII) chairperson and his/her executive committee, a kind of parliament at that level, complete with a speaker and deputy speaker. The council consists of elected councilors representing the parishes, other government officials involved in health, development and education, and NGO officials in the sub-county. In towns, a sub-county is called a division.

The parish: The parish is the next level up from the village. A parish is made up of a number of villages which could range from five to about ten. Each parish has a Local Council II (LCII) Committee, made up of all the chairpersons from the LCIs in the parish. Each LCII will elect, from among themselves, an executive committee. Today, LCIIs are largely involved in settling land disputes and mobilising the community for various activities. The parish is largely run by a parish chief – a government employee who provides technical leadership to the LCII.

The village: A village usually consists of between 50 and 70 households and may be home to anywhere between 250 and 1,000 people. Each village will be run by a local council – local council I (LCI) - and is governed by a chairperson (LCI chairperson) and nine other executive committee members . Uganda has not held any Local Council elections since 2001(a period of fifteen years, 2001–2017) The 1995 Constitution of the Republic of Uganda, Article 181(4) states that local government elections will be held after every five years. The Electoral Commission had not been able to hold the LC elections when Uganda was still passing off as a one-party system of governance, because it was challenged in the case of Rtd Rubaramira Ruranga Vs Electoral Commission and another in the Constitutional Petition No. 21 of 2006 as inappropriate in a multi-party dispensation.

The delay in holding the election was stated to be due to the high cost involved in holding the election through a secret ballot. Uganda currently has over 60,800 villages, initial budgets indicated that this election would cost over 505bn if it were to be held by secret ballot. Various amendments to section 111 cap 140 of the Local Government Act reduced the cost to 15.9bn through providing for lining behind preferred candidates.

The LC1 elections were eventually conducted on the 10th of July 2018 throughout Uganda which was declared a public holiday to allow voters the opportunity to express themselves. This was after 17 years of not holding the local council elections. As stated in the Local Government Act, A chairperson of a lower government council is among other duties; to be the political head at that level, Preside over the council and executive committee meetings, Monitor the general administration of the area under his or her jurisdiction, oversee the performance of persons employed by the Government to provide services in the council's area of jurisdiction and to monitor the provision of Government services or implementation of projects in the area under the council's jurisdiction and also to Perform other functions that may be necessary for the better functioning of the council, or which may be incidental to the functions of the chairperson or imposed on the chairperson by any law.

There are six levels of Local Councils. The lowest level is the Local Council I (LC 1 or LC I) and is responsible for a village or, in the case of towns or cities, a neighborhood. The area covered by Local Councils II through IV incorporates several of the next lowest levels, while a Local Council V (LC5) is responsible for the entire district. In theory, a problem at a local level is relayed up through the various levels until it reaches an LC with sufficient authority or power to resolve it, while centrally planned directives are relayed downward until they are implemented at the local level.

Each Local Council has a certain number of identical positions, such as chairman, Vice-chairman, etc. The Local Council does not transfer nationally. Instead, the national government appoints Resident District Commissioners (RDCs) to represent its interests at the district level.

== See also ==
- Uganda Local Governments Association
