= Bukwo =

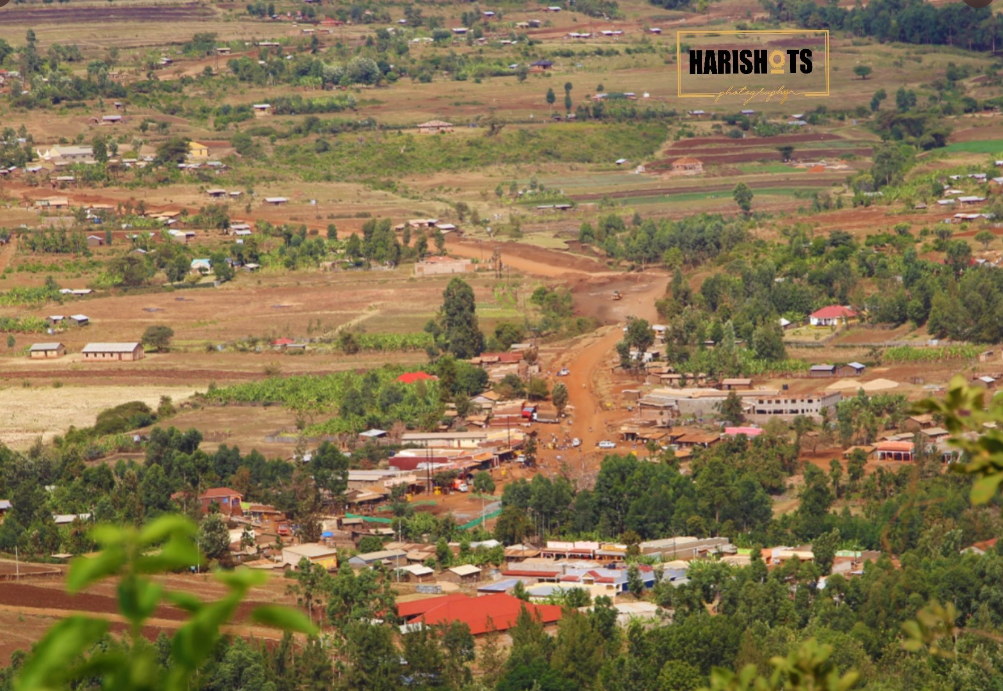
- Bukwo, Uganda

- Map of Uganda showing the location of Bukwo.
- Coordinates: 01°17′34″N 34°45′11″E
- Country: Uganda
- Region: Eastern Uganda
- Sub-region: Sebei sub-region
- District: Bukwo District
- Elevation: 1,760 m (5,770 ft)
- Time zone: UTC+3 (EAT)

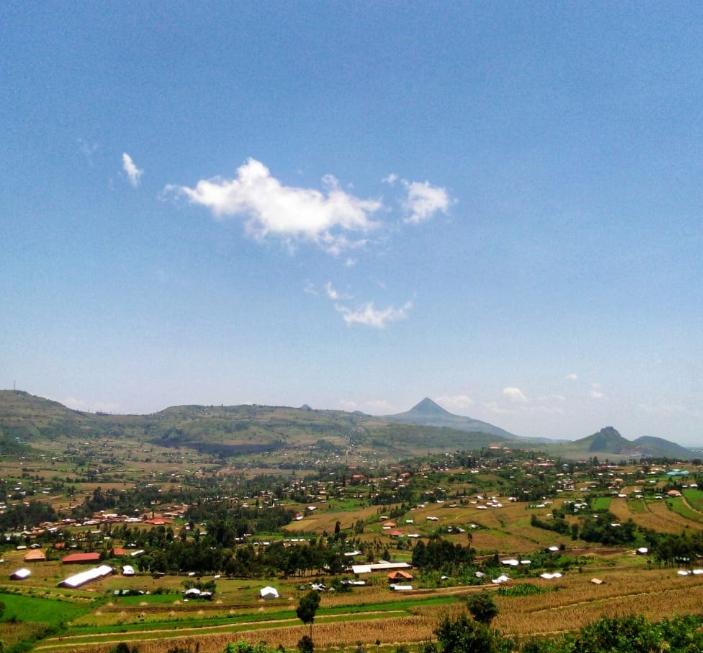
Kapsukwar Mountain view of Bukwo District Town

Bukwo is a town in Eastern Uganda. It is the main municipal, administrative and commercial center of Bukwo District and the headquarters of the district are located there. The district is named after the town.

== Location ==
Bukwo is located 81 kilometres (50 mi) northeast of Mbale and is on the eastern slopes of the Mount Elgon range, close to the border with Kenya. It lies 330 kilometres (210 mi) northeast of Kampala, Uganda's capital and its largest city. The coordinates of the town are:1°17'34.0"N, 34°45'11.0"E (Latitude:1.292764; Longitude:34.753050).

== Population ==
As of May 2014, the exact population of the town of Bukwo is not publicly known.

== Points of interest ==
Te following points of interest lie within the town, or near its borders:

- The headquarters of Bukwo District Administration
- The offices of Bukwo Town Council
- Bukwo Central Market
- Bukwo General Hospital - A public hospital administered by the Uganda Ministry of Health
- Bukwo Training Camp, a running camp that was founded and managed by Italian sports manager Flavio Pascalato in 2014

== See also ==
- Bukwo District
- Sebei
- Eastern Region, Uganda
