= Irene Muloni =

Ugandan politician

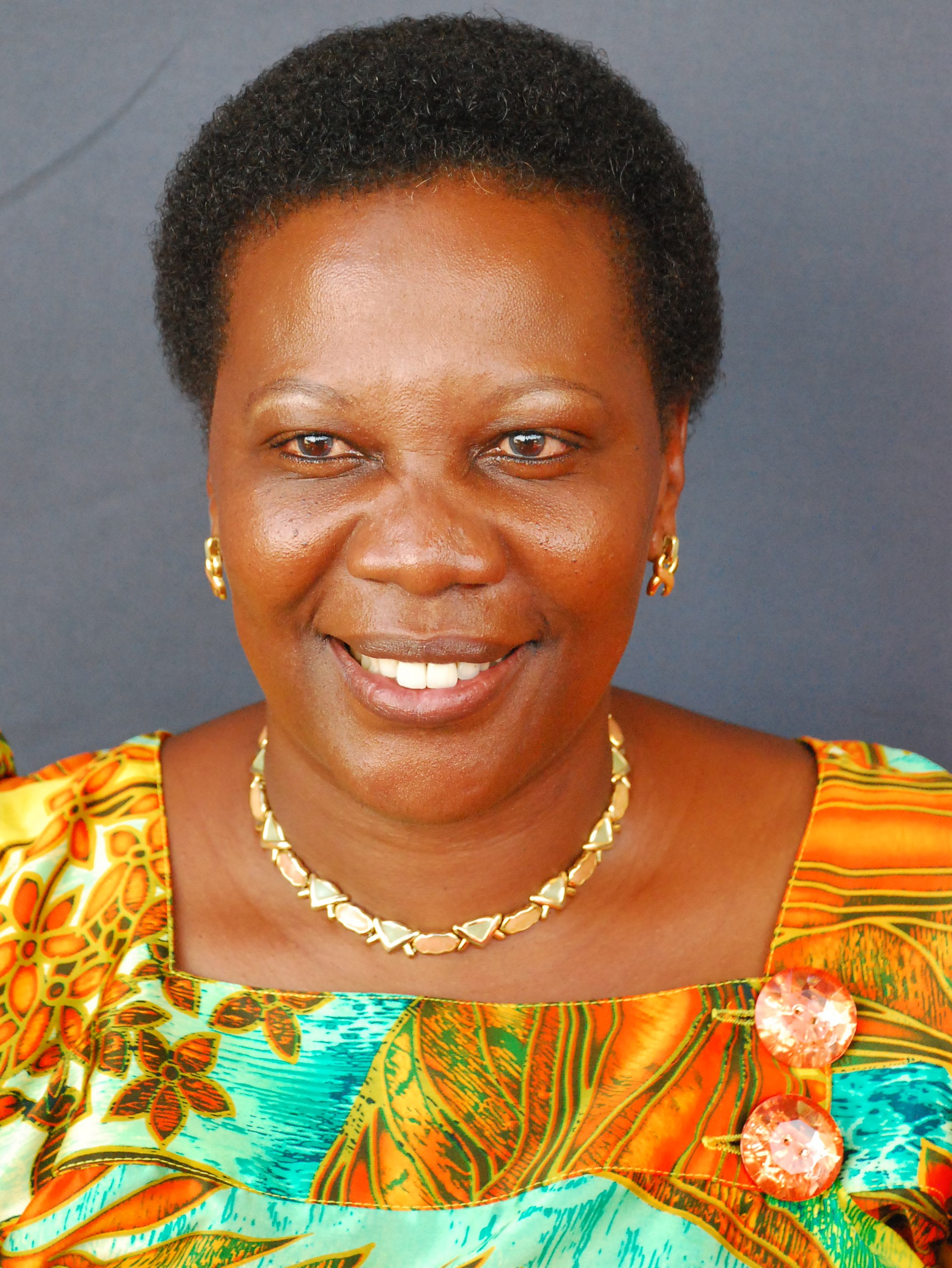
- Muloni in 2018
- Born: 18 November 1960 (age 65)
- Citizenship: Uganda
- Education: Makerere University (Bachelor of Science in Electrical Engineering); Capella University (Master of Business Administration)
- Occupations: Electrical engineer & politician
- Years active: 1986–present

Irene Nafuna Muloni is a Ugandan electrical engineer, businesswoman and politician and also a senior advisor to Ugandan President Yoweri Kaguta Museveni.

She was previously Cabinet Minister for Energy and Minerals in the Ugandan cabinet until December 2019, serving from 27 May 2011. She then retained her position in the new cabinet after the 2016 national elections. She served as the elected Member of Parliament for Bulambuli District Women's Representative, from 2011 until 2016 when she lost her seat to Independent candidate Sarah Wekomba. She also regained her seat after the 2021 general elections.

== Early life and education ==
Muloni was born on 18 November 1960, in what is known today as Bulambuli District. She attended Budadiri Girls' Primary School before entering Gayaza High School. In 1982, she entered Makerere University, the oldest university in East Africa, to study Engineering. In 1986 she graduated with an honours Bachelor of Science in Electrical Engineering (BSc.E.Eng) degree. Later she graduated with a degree of Master of Business Administration (MBA), from Capella University in Minneapolis, Minnesota, United States. She is also a Certified Public-Private Partnership Specialist, accredited by the Institute for Public-Private Partnerships, Inc. (IP3) and the Water, Engineering and Development Centre (WEDC) of Loughborough University.

== Career ==
Since 1986, Muloni has been working with the Uganda Electricity Distribution Company Limited (UEDCL), a Ugandan parastatal company responsible for distribution of electrical power to both commercial and retail customers nationwide. She rose to the position of managing director.

Irene Nfuna Muloni is a Ugandan electrical engineer, politician, businesswoman and senior advisor to the Ugandan president Yoweri Kaguta Museveni. She was previously a cabinet minister for energy and minerals in the Ugandan cabinet until December 2019, serving from 27 May 2011.

== Politics ==
In 2011, she entered elective politics, by successfully contesting for the Bulambuli District Women's Representative in the 9th Ugandan Parliament (2011–2016). On 27 May 2011, she was appointed Minister of Energy & Minerals by President Yoweri Museveni. She replaced Hilary Onek, who was appointed Minister of Internal Affairs. In the cabinet changes made on 6 June 2016, she maintained her cabinet appointment.

== See also ==
- Cabinet of Uganda
- Parliament of Uganda
- Ministry of Energy and mineral Development
- Bulambuli District
- Women in the Ugandan Parliament
- Uganda Electricity Distribution Company Limited
- Makerere University
- Gayaza High School
- Yoweri Museveni
- Energy in Uganda
- List of members of the Parliament of Uganda
