= Arapai =

- Map of Uganda showing the location of Arapai.
- Coordinates: 01°46′48″N 33°37′30″E
- Country: Uganda
- Region: Eastern Region
- Subregion: Teso sub-region
- District: Soroti District
- Elevation: 1,080 m (3,540 ft)
- Time zone: UTC+3 (EAT)

Arapai is a settlement in Eastern Uganda. It is a suburb of the town of Soroti, in Soroti District, in the Teso sub-region.

== Location ==
Arapai is located approximately 8 kilometres (5.0 mi), by road, north of the central business district of the town of Soroti, on the road between Soroti, in Soroti District and Amuria in Amuria District. This location is approximately 245 kilometres (152 mi), by road, northeast of Kampala, Uganda's capital city and largest metropolitan area. The coordinates of Arapai are:1° 46' 48.00"N, 33° 37' 30.00"E (Latitude:1.7800; Longitude:33.6250).

== Population ==
As of December 2013, the exact population of Arapai is not publicly known.

== Points of interest ==
The following points of interest are found in or near Arapai:

- The Arapai Campus of Busitema University - Home to the Faculty of Crop and Animal Science.
- The main campus of Soroti University of Science and Technology
- The campus of Teso College - A boarding boys-only middle (S1-S4) and high (S5-S6) school
- The Soroti-Amuria Road - The road passes through Arapai.

== See also ==
- Soroti
- Soroti District
- Teso sub-region
- Busitema University
