= Budadiri =

Ugandan town

- Location in Uganda
- Coordinates: 01°10′17″N 34°20′06″E
- Country: Uganda
- Region: Eastern Region
- Sub-region: Bugisu sub-region
- District: Sironko District
- Elevation: 1,519 m (4,984 ft)
- Time zone: UTC+3 (EAT)

Budadiri is a town in the Eastern Region of Uganda. It is one of the urban centers in Sironko District.

== Location ==
Budadiri is located approximately 15 kilometres (9 mi), by road, southeast of Sironko, where the district headquarters are located. This is approximately 39 kilometres (24 mi), by road, north-east of Mbale, the largest city in the Bugisu sub-region. The geographical coordinates of the town are:01°10'17.0"N, 34°20'06.0"E (Latitude:1.171389; Longitude:34.335000). Budadiri is situated at an average elevation of 1,519 metres (4,984 ft) above sea level.

== Overview ==
Budadiri is located within Mount Elgon National Park, at the foothills of Mount Elgon. The town is a popular staging area and base camp for climbers who would like to scale the mountain. Budadiri was awarded Municipality status on 1 July 2009.

The town is served by Budadiri Health Centre IV, a medical facility operated by the Ugandan Ministry of Health in conjunction with the Sironko District Local Government. In 2015, Sarah Achieng Opendi, the then State Minister in Charge of Primary Health Care, ordered the immediate transfer of all 48 health workers from Budadiri Health Center IV in Sironko District. The decision followed citizens' complaints against the health workers for theft of government drugs, chronic absenteeism and poor service delivery.

== Challenges ==
The area around Budadiri town is prone of landslides, especially during the rainy season. The terrain is very steep on the slopes of the mountain. On more than one occasion, landslides have killed people and caused loss and damage of property in the Budadiri area and in other parts of Sironko District.

== See also ==
- Bugisu sub-region
- Bagisu
