= Yash Tandon =

Ugandan academic

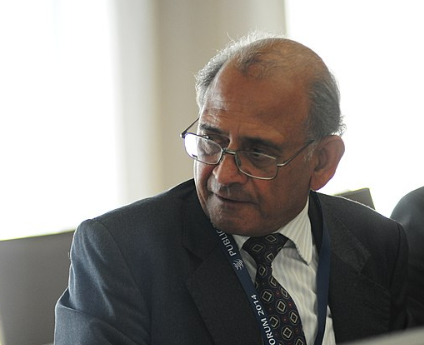
Yash Tandon at a WTO meeting, 2014

Yashpal Tandon (born 21 June 1939) is a Ugandan policymaker, political activist, professor, author and public intellectual. He has lectured extensively in the areas of International Relations and Political economy. He was deeply involved in the struggle against the dictatorship of Idi Amin in 1970's Uganda and has spent time in exile. He is the author and editor of numerous books and articles and has served on the editorial boards of many journals.

== Early and personal life ==
Yash Tandon was born on 21 June 1939 to traders of Indian origin who had settled in the village of Kaberamaido in the Teso District of Uganda. He is married with two children and several grandchildren. He speaks English, Punjabi, Gujarati and Swahili.

He holds a B.Sc. in economics from the London School of Economics (1961). Tandon went on to attain a Master's in Economics in 1965. He completed his PhD. in International relations at the London School of Economics in 1969.

He won the 1962 David Davies Memorial Institute in International Peace Prize, London, U.K.

== Academic career ==
From 1964 to 1972 Tandon lectured at the Makerere University, Kampala, Uganda before reading in International relations there. He spent three months as a visiting lecturer at the University of Dar es Salaam in 1968. He spent another three months as a visiting lecturer at the National Institute of Public Administration in Lusaka, Zambia in 1972. From 1967 to 1968, Tandon spent fifteen months in a senior research fellowship at Columbia University, New York City.

From 1972 to 1973 he lectured in International Relations at the London School of Economics, UK. In 1973, Tandon returned to Africa in the role of Professor in Political Economy at the University of Dar es Salaam. Upon his return to Uganda following the collapse of Amin's government, he was professor in International Relations at Makerere University, lecturing in African International Relations.

From 1982 to 1983, Tandon was a visiting professor/consultant with the Zimbabwe Institute of Development Studies in Harare.

== Political involvement ==
Following his completion of education in London, Tandon returned to Uganda. He left in 1972 with the rise to power of Idi Amin. He went into exile, first in Kenya for three months, and then in the UK for nine months.

In the 1970s Tandon engaged in underground political work with broad democratic force for change of the Idi Amin regime in Uganda. He was a founding member of the Uganda National Liberation Front (UNLF), and one of the principal organisers of the May 1979 Moshi Conference for the launch of the UNLF Government.

Following the collapse of Amin's regime, Tandon returned to Uganda. He was a member of the National Consultive Council (National Parliament), with a short spell as Minister of State. At this time, he was involved in negotiations with intergovernmental organisations and donors for the rehabilitation of Uganda's economy. He was chairman and member of various parliamentary committees.

In 1980, with the overthrowing of the Government of the UNLF by military coup, Tandon went into exile in Kenya for a year and a half. There he was the founder and director of Uganda Refugees Relief Service (URRS). At the same time, he engaged in political work for democratic struggle in Uganda.

== Career outside academia ==
From 1966 to 1968 Tandon was the Director of the Makerere Institute of Diplomacy. In the 1970s, he was the executive director of the Makerere Institute of Social Research (MISR), a consultant at the International Peace Academy in New York and a founder member of the Uganda Asia Evacuees Association. During this time, Tandon was the vice-president of the International Studies Association (ISA), USA. He was also a founder member of the African Association of Political Science (AAPS) and its first Research Director.

In the 1980s he was founder and director of Research and Consultancy Ltd., Nairobi, Kenya. He was also the founder and managing director of Research and Consultancy (pvt) Ltd., (RESCON), Harare.

Spanning the 1990s and 2000s, Tandon was a founder member and the first director of the International South Group Network (ISGN). He was the founder and director of Southern and Eastern African Trade Information and Negotiations Institute (SEATINI). He was a founder member of Alternatives to Neoliberalism in Southern Africa (ANSA). Tandon served as the executive director of the South Centre for five years until his retirement in 2009.

== Author and editor ==
Tandon has written extensively on matters related to the African economy and international relations. He specialises in political economy.

He has written over one hundred scholarly articles and has authored and edited books on wide-ranging subjects including on African politics, Peace and Security, Trade and WTO, International economics, South – South Cooperation and Human rights. He has also served on several advisory committees.

He has served on the editorial boards of several academic journals, including Mawazo (Makerere), Instant Research on Peace and Violence (Finland) and Sage International Yearbook on Foreign Policy Studies (Syracuse, USA), African Review, Utafiti (as chief editor), Economic Journal of Zimbabwe. He was also the editor of University of Dar es Salaam: Debate on Class, State and Imperialism (1982).

== Selected publications ==
=== Author ===
- Le commerce, c'est la guerre, préface de Jean Ziegler (PUBLICETIM N°39, édition du CETIM, 224 pages, 2015, ISBN 978-2-88053-111-9, www.cetim.ch)
- Trade is War (Or Book, New York, 2015)
- Ending Aid Dependence, with Bejamin W Mkapa (Fahamu Books, 2008) - French translation: En finir avec la dépendance à l'aide, Préfaces de Samir Amin et de Benjamin W. Mkapa (PUBLICETIM N°34, co-édition CETIM/Fahamu Books/South Centre, 224 pages, 2009, ISBN 978-2-88053-075-4)
- Daring to Think Differently: Development and Globalisation (Fahamu Books, 2009)
- In Defence of Democracy (Dar es Salaam University Press, 1994)
- The New Position of East Africa's Asians, Mrg Report 16: Problems of a Displaced Minority, with arnold Raphael (Minority Rights Group, 1984)
- Regional Development at the National Level: Canadian and African Perspectives, with Timothy M Shaw (University Press of America, 1986)
- Problems of a Displaced Minority: New Position of East African Asians (Minority Rights Group, 1973)
- Militarism and Peace education in Africa: A guide and manual for peace education and action in Africa (African Association for Literacy and Adult Education, 1989)

=== Editor ===
- Paved with Good Intention: Background to the GATT Uruguay Round and WTO (SEATINI Readings in Globalisation and World trade), with Megan Allardice (SEATINI Zimbabwe, 2005)
- Readings in African international Relations (East African Lit. Bureau, 1977)
- Horizons of African Diplomacy, with D Chandarana (East African Lit. Bureau, 1977)

=== Articles ===
- Kenya democracy on trial, 2009
- Political, economic and climatic crises of Western civilization: Dangers and opportunities
- The Violence of Globalisation
- The Future of Aid
- Developed Countries are Playing Duck and Dive
- The Principles of Food Sovereignty
- Foreign Direct Investment is Impoverishing the South
- The Paris Declaration and Aid Effectiveness
- The Principles of Food Security
- The committed intellectual: reviving and restoring the National Project
