= Bulambuli =

- Location in Uganda
- Coordinates: 01°09′36″N 34°23′48″E
- Country: Uganda
- Region: Eastern Uganda
- Sub-region: Bugisu sub-region
- District: Bulambuli District

Bulambuli is a town in Eastern Uganda. It is the main municipal, administrative and commercial center of Bulambuli District. The district is named after the town.

== Location ==
Bulambuli is located 280 kilometres (170 mi) northeast of Kampala, Uganda's capital and its largest city, and 32 kilometres (20 mi) northeast of Mbale, the largest town in the sub-region. The approximate coordinates of Bulambuli are:1°09'36.0"N, 34°23'48.0"E (Latitude:1.160000; Longitude:34.396667). The coordinates are approximate because Bulambuli does not yet show up on most publicly available maps as of May 2014.

== Population ==
In 2012 the population of Bulambuli was estimated to be approximately 125,400

== Points of interest ==
The following points of interest lie within the town limits or close to the edges of the town:

- The headquarters of Bulambuli District Administration
- The offices of Bulambuli Town Council
- Bulambuli Central Market
- Mount Elgon - The town lies in the foothills of the Mountain.

== See also ==
- Bugisu
- Bagisu
- Mt. Elgon
- Bulambuli District
- Eastern Uganda
