= Atutur General Hospital =

Public hospital in Uganda

- Uganda Ministry of Health
- Location within Uganda

Geography
- Location: Atutur, Kumi District, Eastern Region, Uganda
- Coordinates: 01°24′34″N 33°59′27″E

Organisation
- Care system: Public
- Type: General

Services
- Emergency department: I
- Beds: 100

History
- Founded: 1969

Links
- Other links: Hospitals in Uganda

Atutur General Hospital, also Atutur Hospital, is a government-owned hospital in the Eastern Region of Uganda.

== Location ==
The hospital is located on the Tororo-Mbale-Soroti Road, in the community of Atutur, in Kumi District, in the Teso sub-region, in the Eastern Region of Uganda. Its location is about 59 kilometres (37 mi) southeast of Soroti Regional Referral Hospital. This is approximately 45 kilometres (28 mi) northwest of Mbale Regional Referral Hospital.

Atutur General Hospital lies about 12 kilometres (7 mi) southeast of the central business district of the town of Kumi, where the district headquarters are located. The coordinates of Atutur General Hospital are: 01°24'34.0"N, 33°59'27.0"E (Latitude:1.409437; Longitude:33.990830).

== Overview ==
Atutur General Hospital was built in 1969 to serve the districts of Kumi, Bukedea, Ngora and Pallisa. The hospital infrastructure has deteriorated and the hospital equipment has become obsolete. The hospital is severely understaffed and underfunded.

== Renovation ==
In 2013, the government of Uganda secured a loan from the World Bank, to construct, renovate and equip selected government-owned hospitals, including Aturtur General Hospital.

== See also ==
- List of hospitals in Uganda
