= Atutur Town =

Mukongoro
- Location in Uganda
- Coordinates: 01°19′25″N 33°53′18″E
- Country: Uganda
- Region: Eastern Uganda
- Sub-region: Teso sub-region
- District: Kumi District
- Elevation: 3,540 ft (1,080 m)

Mukongoro is a town in the Eastern Region of Uganda.

== Location ==
The town lies on the Tirinyi–Pallisa–Kamonkoli–Kumi Road, in Atutur Parish, Atutur sub-county, Kumi District, approximately 22 kilometres (14 mi) southeast of Kumi Town, where the district headquarters are located. Atutur is located 48 kilometres (30 mi) northwest of Mbale, the nearest large city. The coordinates of Atutur Town are: 01°19'25.0"N, 33°53'18.0"E (Latitude:1.323605; Longitude:33.888341).

== Overview ==
Atutur General Hospital sits in Atutur sub-county, on the Tororo–Mbale–Soroti Road, about 17 kilometres (11 mi) northeast of Atutur Town.

== See also ==
- List of hospitals in Uganda
- List of roads in Uganda
