= Kween District =

- District
- District location in Uganda
- Coordinates: 01°25′N 34°31′E
- Country: Uganda
- Capital: Binyiny

Area
  - Land: 851.4 km^{2} (328.7 sq mi)

Population (2024 Estimate)
  - Total: 129,277
  - Density: 121.3/km^{2} (314/sq mi)
- Time zone: UTC+3 (EAT)

Kween District is a district in Eastern Uganda. The district headquarters are located at Binyiny, one of the two town councils in the district.

== Location ==
Kween District is bordered by Nakapiripirit District to the north, Amudat District to the northeast, Bukwo District to the east, the Republic of Kenya to the south, Kapchorwa District to the west and Bulambuli District to the northwest. The town of Binyiny, where the district headquarters are located lies 69 kilometres (43 mi) northeast of Mbale, the nearest large city. The coordinates of Kween District are:01 25N, 34 31E.

== Overview ==
The district was created by act of parliament and started functioning on 1 July 2010. Prior to that, it was part of Kapchorwa District. Together with Kapchorwa District and Bukwo District, it forms the Sebei sub-region, formerly known as Sebei District. The district is located on the northern slopes of Mount Elgon, at an average altitude of about 1,900 metres (6,200 ft), above sea level. The district has three town councils; namely: Binyiny, where the district headquarters are located, Kaproron and Chepsukunya.

== Population ==
In 1991, the national population census estimated the district population at about 37,300. The 2002 national census estimated the population of the district to be approximately 67,200. The district annual population growth rate was calculated to be 4.5%. In 2012, the population of Kween District was estimated at 103,300.

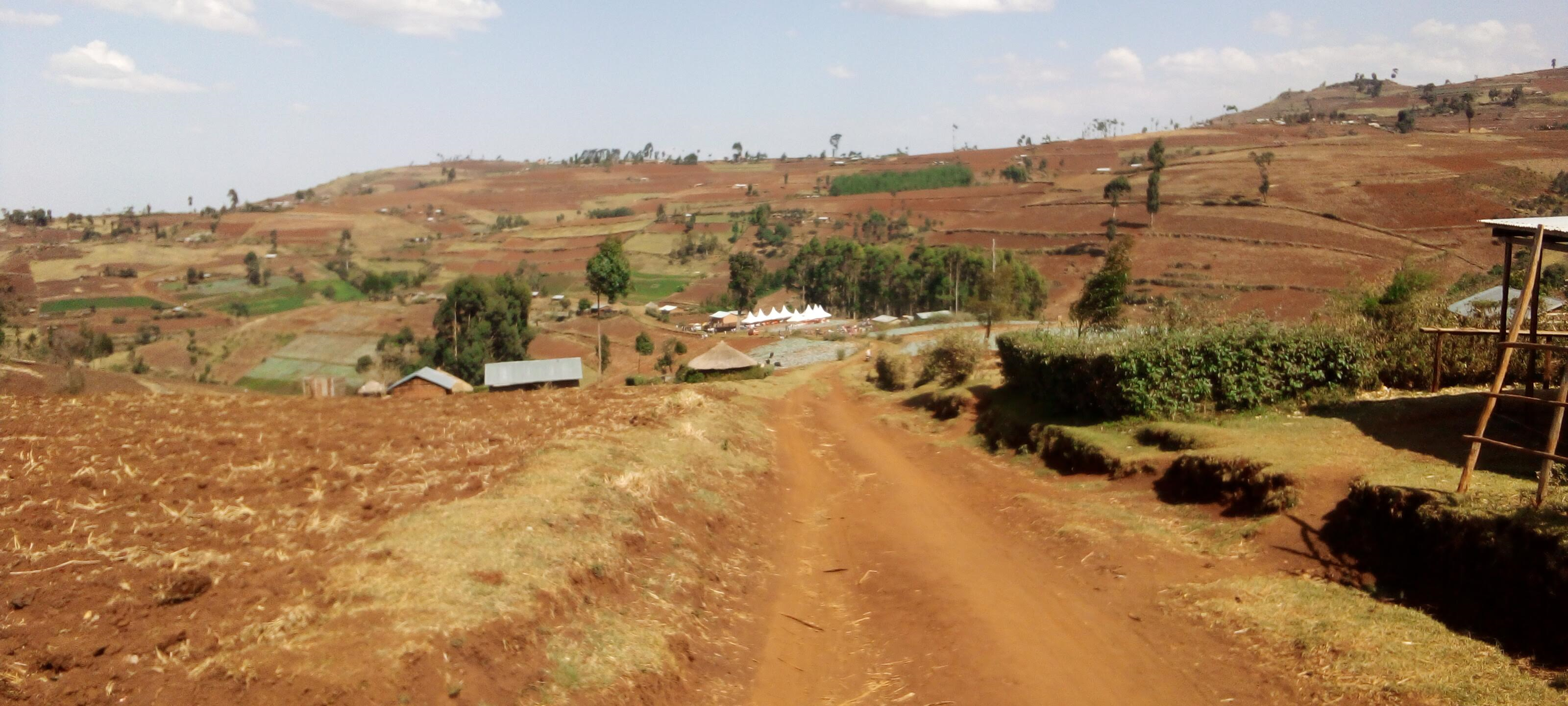
Kween District.

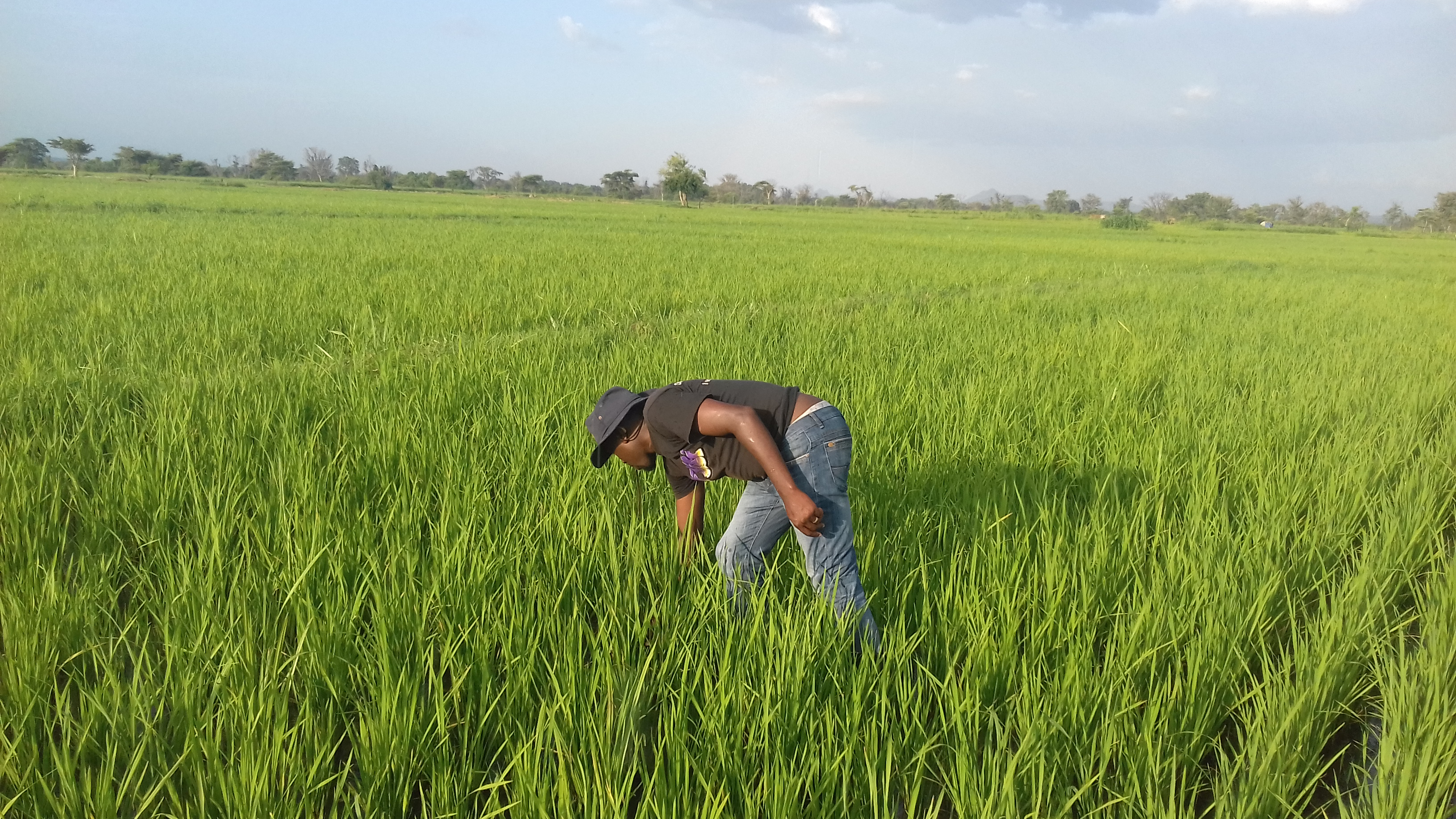
A man attends to a rice field in Ngenge Village, Kween District-Eastern Uganda.

== Transport ==
The Mbale-Moroto Highway passes through the western environs of Kween District, in a general north to south direction.

== Economic activity ==
- Rice
- Maize
- Cassava
- Beans

== Livestock ==
- Cattle
- Chicken
- Goat

== See also ==
- Binyiny
- Sebei
- Uganda Districts
- Kapchorwa District
