= Sironko District =

- District
- District location in Uganda
- Coordinates: 01°14′N 34°15′E
- Country: Uganda
- Region: Eastern Region
- Sub-region: Bugisu sub-region
- Established: 1 July 2000
- Capital: Sironko

Area
  - Land: 446.1 km^{2} (172.2 sq mi)
- Elevation: 1,420 m (4,660 ft)

Population (2012 Estimate)
  - Total: 239,600
  - Density: 537.1/km^{2} (1,391/sq mi)
- Time zone: UTC+3 (EAT)
- Website: www.sironko.go.ug

Sironko District is a district in the Eastern Region of Uganda. The district was created in 2000 and had previously been part of Mbale District. Sironko is the main commercial town in the district.

== Location ==
Sironko District is bordered by Bulambuli District to the north, Kapchorwa and Kween Districts to the north-east, Kenya to the east, Bududa District to the south-east, Mbale District to south-west, and Bukedea District to the west. Sironko lies 22 kilometres (14 mi) north-east of Mbale, the largest city in the Bugisu sub-region.

The Uganda Bureau of Statistics (UBOS) 2024 National Population and Housing Census final results, Sironko District consists of county, sub-counties including town councils, and parishes also including wards.

=== Budadiri County ===
This is the sole administrative county, covering the entirety of Sironko District. It is also further divided into town councils and sub-counties.

=== Town Councils ===
- Budadiri Town Council: Budadiri Ward, Bumulanyi Ward, Bunamula Ward, and Kibale Ward.
- Bugusege Town Council: Bugusege Ward, Bukimali Ward, Kakodye Ward, and Kitoko Ward.
- Bukiiti Town Council: Bukiiti A Ward, Bukiiti B Ward, and Nakalama Ward.
- Butandiga Town Council: Butandiga Ward, Gibuzi Ward, and Sigwa Ward.
- Buteza Town Council: Buteza Ward, Bufunani Ward, and Bukasagala Ward.
- Buweri Town Council: Buweri Ward, Bumausi Ward, and Bunanimi Ward.
- Gombe Gasawa Town Council: Gombe Ward and Gasawa Ward.
- Kama Town Council: Kama Ward and Bukaya Ward.
- Mutufu Town Council: Mutufu Ward, Buwalasi Ward, and Buyaka Ward.
- Sironko Town Council: Central Ward, Kibira Ward, Kirombe Ward, and Sironko Ward.

=== Sub-Counties ===
- Bubbeza: Bubbeza and Bumausi.
- Bugambi: Bugambi and Bukimali.
- Bugitimwa: Bugitimwa, Bunandala, and Butama.
- Buhugu: Buhugu, Bugusege, and Bumumali.
- Bukhulo: Bubestye, Bukhulo, Kirombe, Mpogo, and Soola.
- Bukiise: Bukiise, Bunandutu, and Walanga.
- Bukiyi: Bukiyi, Bunagawoya, and Nampanga.
- Bukyabo: Bukyabo, Buboolo, and Bumawosi.
- Bukyambi: Bukyambi and Bunabyaye.
- Bumalimba: Bumalimba and Bunagaba.
- Bumasifwa: Bumasifwa, Bunandele, and Buwasa.
- Bumulisha: Bumulisha and Bunangaka.
- Bunyafwa: Bunyafwa and Bumonye.
- Busamaga: Busamaga and Bumirisa.
- Busiita: Busiita and Bunabbasi.
- Busulani: Busulani, Bunagawoya, and Butanza.
- Butandiga: Butandiga and Gibuzi.
- Buteza: Buteza, Bufunani, and Bukasagala.
- Buwalasi: Buwalasi, Bumulanyi, and Buyaka.
- Buwasa: Buwasa and Bumasifwa.
- Buyobo: Buyobo and Bumagabula.
- Dahami: Dahami and Bunanganda.
- Elgon: Elgon and Bunambayo.
- Kikobero: Kikobero and Bunambogo.
- Legenya: Legenya and Bunabbasi.
- Lulena: Lulena and Bumonye.
- Mafudu: Mafudu and Bukitangi.
- Masaba: Masaba and Bunambatsi.
- Nalusala: Nalusala and Bukyabo.
- Namaguli: Namaguli and Bumonye.
- Namugabwe: Namugabwe and Bukimali.
- Zesui: Zesui, Bumanza, and Bunagaba.

== Population ==
In 1991, the national population census estimated the district population at 147,700. The 2002 census estimated the population at 185,800, with an annual growth rate of 2.6 percent. The population was estimated to be 239,600 in 2012. in 2014, 242,421 and 2024 the population was 298,363.

== Geography ==
The district has a total area of 446.1 square kilometres (172.2 mi^{2}).

== Major towns ==
Sironko is the largest town and the administrative headquarters of the district. Mafuni, Nakaloke, Mutufu, and Budadiri are the main trading centers within the district.

== Counties, sub-counties and constituencies ==
Budadiri County is the only county in the district.

== Economy ==
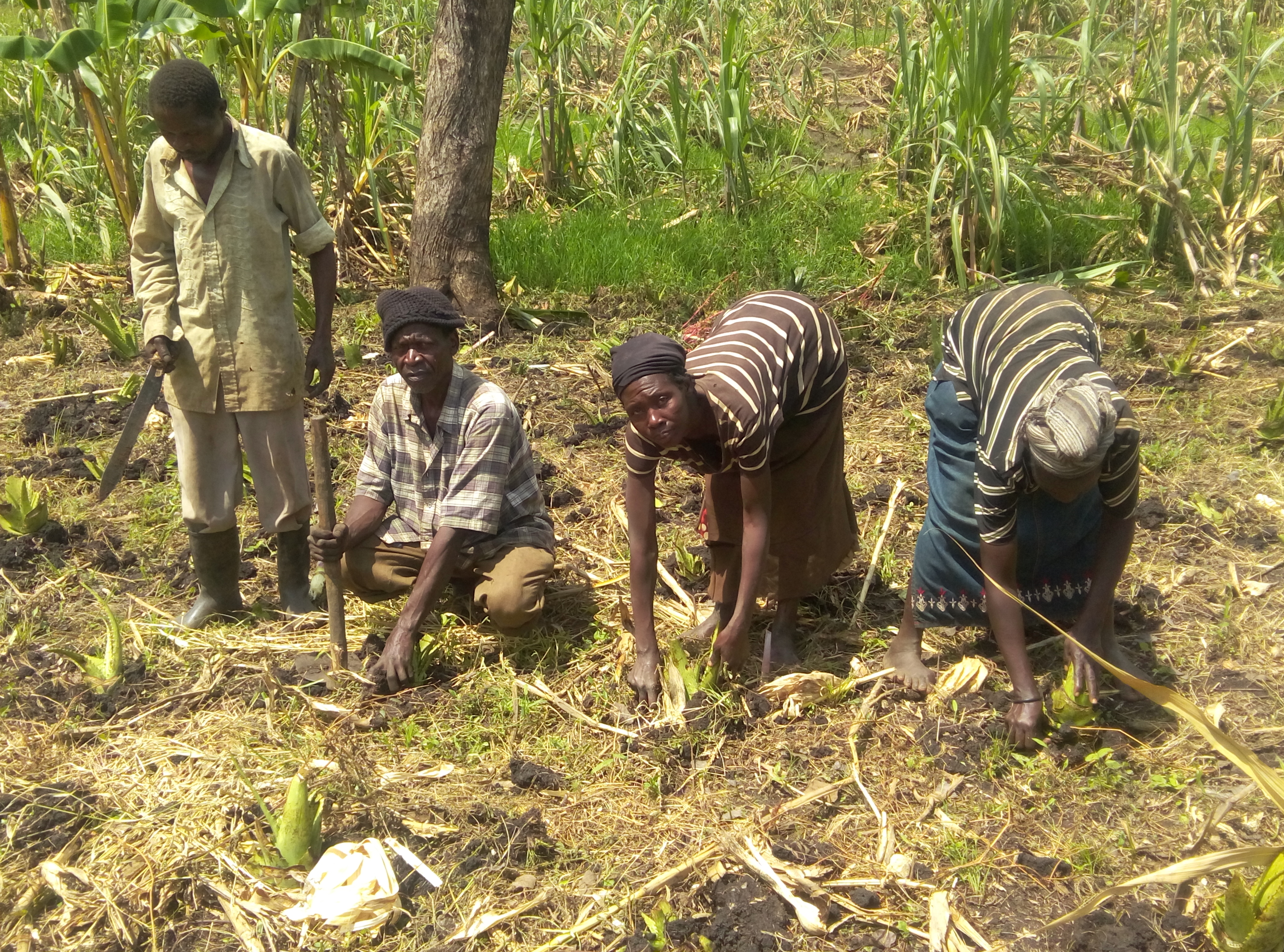
Aloe vera planting in Sironko district

The primary activity is agriculture with a focus on food crops such as beans, groundnuts, sorghum, millet, cassava, potatoes and sweet potatoes. Coffee and cotton are the main cash crops. Fruits and vegetables grown in the district include passion fruit, tomatoes, onions and cabbage.

== Tourist attractions ==
Part of Mount Elgon National Park lies within Sironko district. One of the two main trails in the park, Sasa trail, starts near the Budadiri trading center located within the district.

== Livestock Kept by the population ==
- Cattle
- Chicken
- Pig
- Goat

== See also ==
- Parliament of Uganda
- Eastern Region, Uganda
- Mbale
- Bugisu sub-region
- Sironko
- Districts of Uganda
- Masaba people
