= Kapchorwa =

Kapchorwa (Kapchorwa Municipality)
- Town
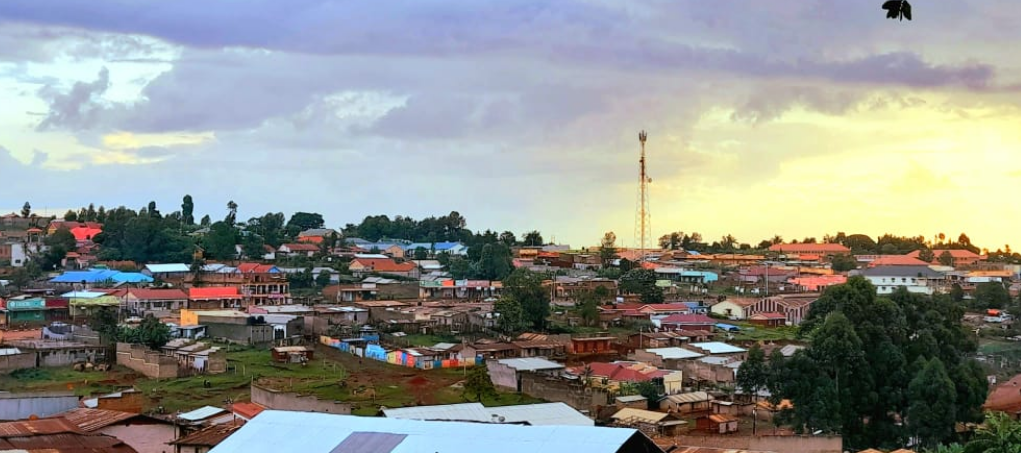

- Location in Uganda
- Coordinates: 01°24′00″N 34°27′00″E
- Country: Uganda
- Region: Eastern Uganda
- Sub-region: Sebei sub-region
- District: Kapchorwa District
- Elevation: 5,900 ft (1,800 m)

Population (2024 Census)
  - Total: 54,520

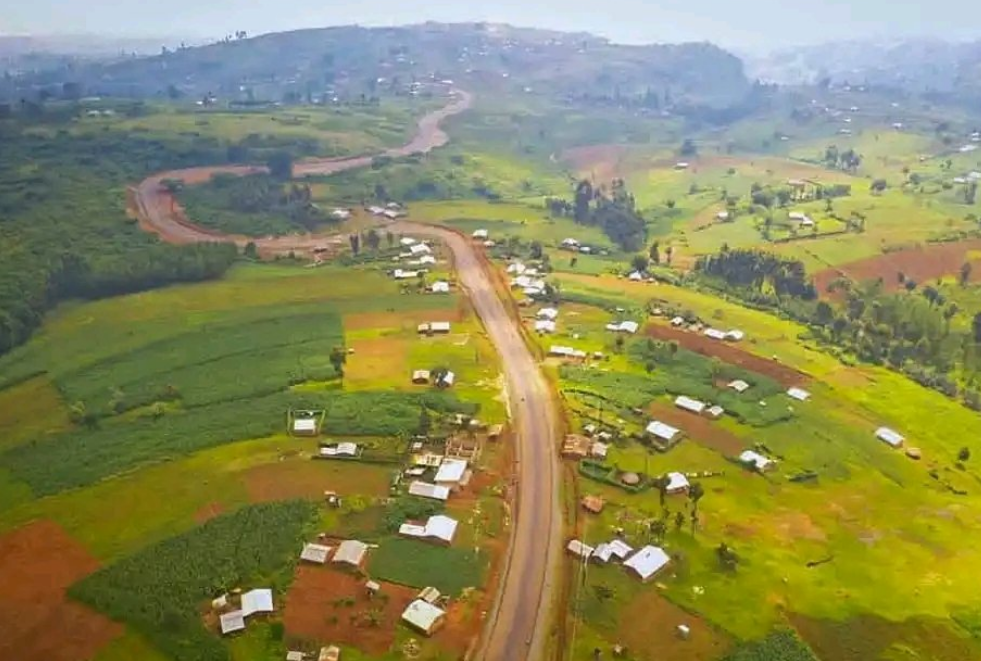
Kapchorwa Upper belt (Kwoti, Kapenguria)

Flag of Kapchorwa district

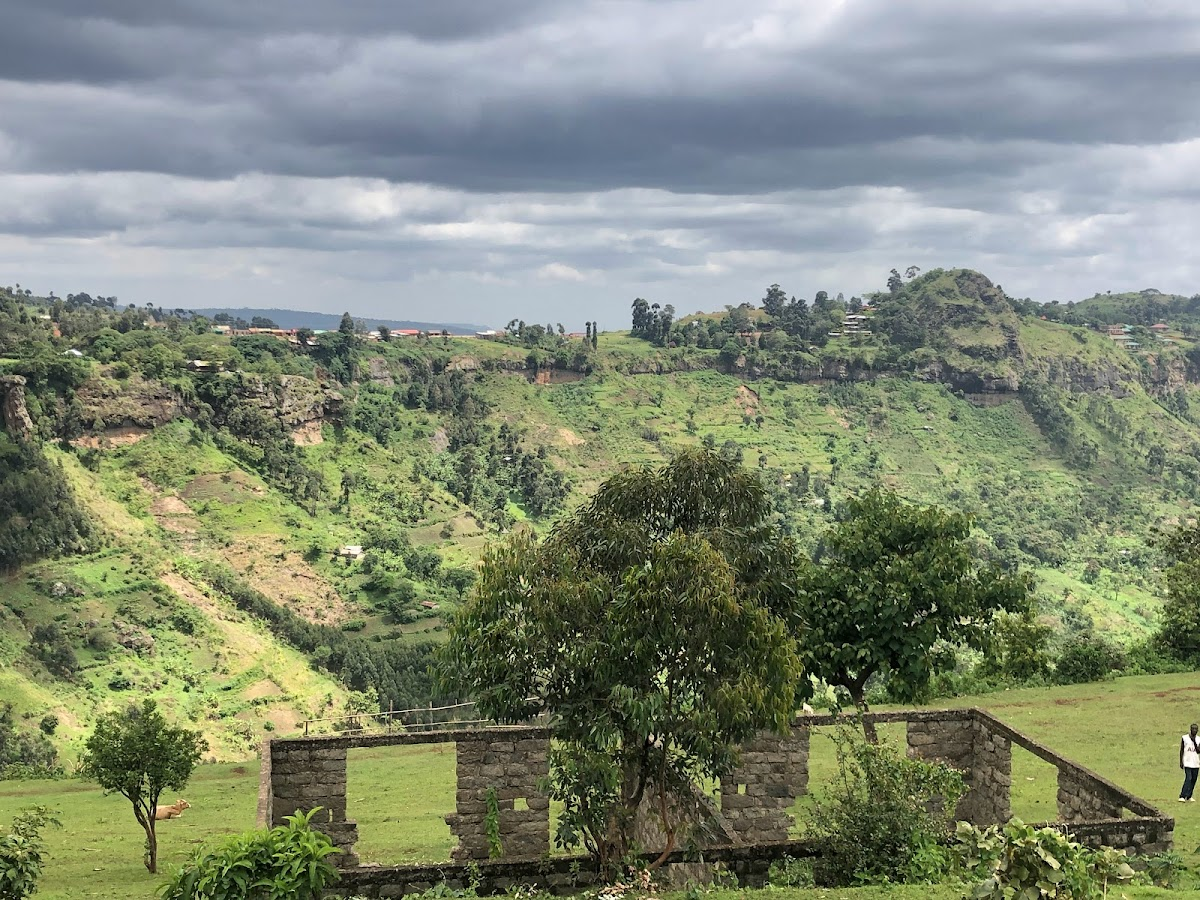
Sipi valley in Kapchorwa as seen from Sipi Valley Resort

Kapchorwa is a town in the Eastern Region of Uganda. It is the main municipal, commercial, and administrative center of Kapchorwa District. Initially, the town of Kapchorwa was known as the Sebei Region.

== Location ==
The town of Kapchorwa is located in the Sebei sub-region, approximately 65 kilometres (40 mi), by road, northeast of Mbale, the largest city in the Eastern Region. This is approximately 310 kilometres (190 mi), by road, northeast of Kampala, Uganda's capital and largest city. It is also approximately 77km from the Suam Kenya-Uganda Border to the east.The coordinates of the town are 1°24'00.0"N 34°27'00.0"E (latitude:1.4000; longitude: 34.4500).

== Demographics ==
During the 2002 national population census, Kapchorwa's population was estimated at 8,700. In 2010, the Uganda Bureau of Statistics (UBOS) estimated the population at 12,300. In 2011, UBOS estimated the mid-year population at 12,900.

== Points of interest ==
The following points of interest lie within the town limits or close to the edges of the town:

- headquarters of Kapchorwa District Administration
- offices of Kapchorwa Town Council
- mobile branch of PostBank Uganda
- Kapchorwa central market
- Town View Secondary School, a middle school (grades 8 - 11)
- Kapchorwa Senior Secondary School
- Kapchorwa police station
- Centenary Bank, Kapchorwa Branch
- Stanbic Bank Uganda Limited
- Kapchorwa General Hospital, a 150-bed public hospital administered by Uganda Ministry of Health
- From Coach to Coach headquarters

== Running community ==
Kapchorwa is a home to successful running athletes in the past decade, including gold olympic and world championship medalists, like Joshua Cheptegei, Jacob Kiplimo and Stephen Kiprotich still living and training there. Due do this fact and the benefits of high altitude for running Kapchorwa is called a "running paradise".

== See also ==
- List of hospitals in Uganda
- List of cities and towns in Uganda
