= Amuria =

Ugandan town

- Location in Uganda
- Coordinates: 02°01′48″N 33°38′35″E
- Country: Uganda
- Region: Eastern Region of Uganda
- Sub-region: Teso sub-region
- District: Amuria District
- Elevation: 3,596 ft (1,096 m)

Population (2020 Estimate)
  - Total: 8,900

Amuria is a town in the Eastern Region of Uganda. It is the chief municipal, administrative, and commercial center of Amuria District, in the Teso sub-region.

== Location ==
Amuria is located 36.5 kilometres (23 mi), by road, north of Soroti, the largest city in the Teso sub-region. Amuria sits about 151 kilometres (94 mi) southwest of the city of Moroto, the largest city in the neighboring Karamoja sub-region.

Amuria is 327 kilometres (203 mi), by road, northeast of Kampala, the capital and largest city of Uganda. The coordinates of the town are:2°01'48.0"N, 33°38'35.0"E (Latitude:2.0300;Longitude:33.6431). Amuria town sits at an average elevation of 1,096 metres (3,596 ft) above mean sea level.

== Population ==
In 1991, the national population census estimated the town's population at 2,600. In 2010, the Uganda Bureau of Statistics (UBOS) estimated the population at 5,000. In 2011, the UBOS put the population at about 5,400.

During the first decade of the 2000s, the population of the town has fluctuated from as low as 4,500 to as high as 30,000. Several factors have contributed to the rapid increase in the population of the town, including the following:

1. The activities of the Lord's Resistance Army forced the population out of the villages into the town due to better security in urban areas.

2. The Karamojong attack the villages in Amuria District to steal cattle and harm anyone who attempts to stop them. The villagers in the neighboring villages move closer to town to avoid the wrath of the cattle rustlers.

3. The congregation of many people in IDP camps, who are not related by blood and who are idle for the most part, leads to increased sexual activity, increased birth rates and a rapid expansion in the population.

4. In mid-2007, the LRA ceased activity in Uganda and moved away to the Democratic Republic of the Congo, but the Karamojong have continued with their cattle raids.

In 2015, the Uganda Bureau of Statistics, UBOS estimated the mid-year population of Amuria at 7,500 people. In 2020, UBOS estimated the mid-year population at 8,900 people. Of these, 4,500 (50.6 percent) were males and 4,400 (49.4 percent) were females. UBOS calculated the annual population growth rate of the town to average 3.48 percent, between 2015 and 2020.

Historical population
Year	Pop.	±%
1991	2,600	—
2010	5,000	+92.3%
2011	5,400	+8.0%
2015	7,500	+38.9%
2020	8,900	+18.7%

== Points of interest ==
The following points of interest lie with Amuria Town or close to its borders:

1. The headquarters of Amuria District Administration

2. St. Andrew's Anglican Church, a place of worship affiliated with the Church of Uganda

3. The offices of Amuria Town Council

4. Amuria central market, the largest source of fresh produce in the town

5. The Soroti–Amuria–Abim–Kotido Road passes through the middle of town in a general south to north direction.

== See also ==
- Teso people
- Teso language
- List of cities and towns in Uganda
