= Bukwo District =

- District
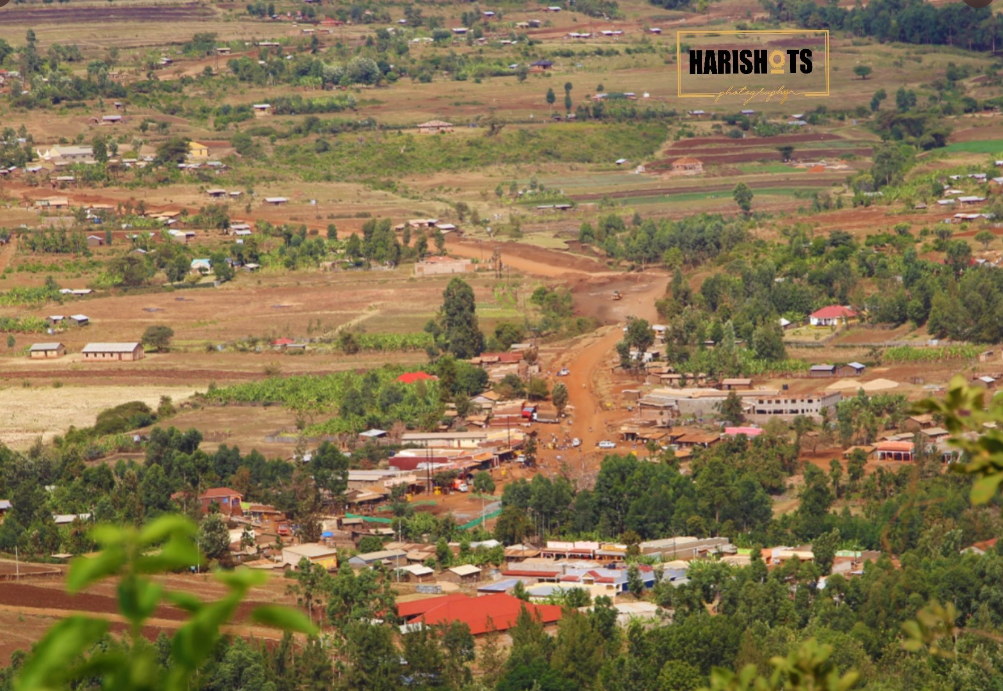
- The center of Bukwo Town

- District location in Uganda
- Coordinates: 01°16′N 34°44′E
- Country: Uganda
- Region: Eastern Uganda
- Sub-division: Sebei sub-region
- Established: 1 July 2005
- Capital: Bukwo

Area
  - Land: 524.9 km^{2} (202.7 sq mi)

Population (2012 Estimate)
  - Total: 73,400
  - Density: 139.8/km^{2} (362/sq mi)
- Time zone: UTC+3 (EAT)
- Website: bukwo.go.ug

Bukwo District is a district in the Eastern Region of Uganda. The town of Bukwo is its main political, administrative, and commercial center and the site of the district headquarters. It was split off from Kapchorwa District in 2005.

== Location ==
Bukwo District is bordered by Amudat District to the north, Kenya to the east and south, and Kween District to the west and northwest. The town of Bukwo is approximately 83 kilometres (52 mi), by road, northeast of Mbale the nearest large city on the slopes of Mount Elgon. The coordinates of the district are 01 16N, 34 44E.

== Overview ==
The district was created on 1 July 2005. Before then, Bukwo District was part of Kapchorwa District. It was the former Kongasis county.

The district has many well-educated people, but many have left to find greater prosperity in the neighbouring country of Kenya.

Many of the district's roads are inaccessible or impassable. There is a widespread lack of electricity and telecommunication services throughout the district. The various Ugandan governments have not developed this part of the country, starting with the colonial governments in the early part of the 20th century, through the Obote I, Idi Amin, Obote II, and National Resistance Movement regimes.

Many of the inhabitants of Bukwo District live in abject poverty. The district is also plagued by persistent insecurity due to cattle raids and cattle rustling by ethnic groups from Karamoja located in northeastern Uganda and the Turkana and Pokot peoples from neighbouring Kenya. These challenges date to the 1950s and 1960s.

Most of the people from the northern part of the district have been internally displaced by cattle rustlers and have since not been resettled back in their original land. Some of these people opted to purchase land from areas that appeared secure while others who could not afford to purchase new land continue to exist as squatters on well-wishers' land.

== Population ==
In 1991, the national population census estimated the district population at 30,700. The national census in 2002 estimated the population at 49,000, with an annual population growth rate of 4.2 percent. In 2012, the population was estimated at 73,400.

In 2014 the population projection of 2020 an estimate of 119.100

Peoples living in Bukwo District are the Sebei / Kalenjin speaking Kupsabiny language.

== Political divisions ==
The district is made up of eleven sub-counties (Bukwo, Chepkwasta, Chesower, Kabei, Kamet, Kaptererwo, Kortek, Riwo, Senendet, Suam, and Tulel) and one town council (Bukwo).

== Notable people ==
- Joshua Cheptegei 10,000m 2020 Olympic Gold Medalist
- Jacob Kiplimo 5,000m runner
- Peruth Chemutai 3,000m SC 2020 Olympic Gold Medalist
- Moses Ndiema Kipsiro 5000m Distance Runner.

== Economic Activities ==
Subsistence agriculture is the main economic activity in Bukwo District. Crops grown include the following:

- Millet
- Potatoes
- Beans
- Apples
- Coffee
- Wheat
- Tomatoes
- Cabbage
- Passion fruit
- Onions
- Maize

Animal husbandry is practiced; the livestock domesticated are mainly cattle, goats, sheep, donkeys, hogs and chicken.

== See also ==
- Districts of Uganda
- Sebei
- Kalenjin
- Kupsabiny
- Eastern Region Uganda
