= Kapchorwa District =

- District
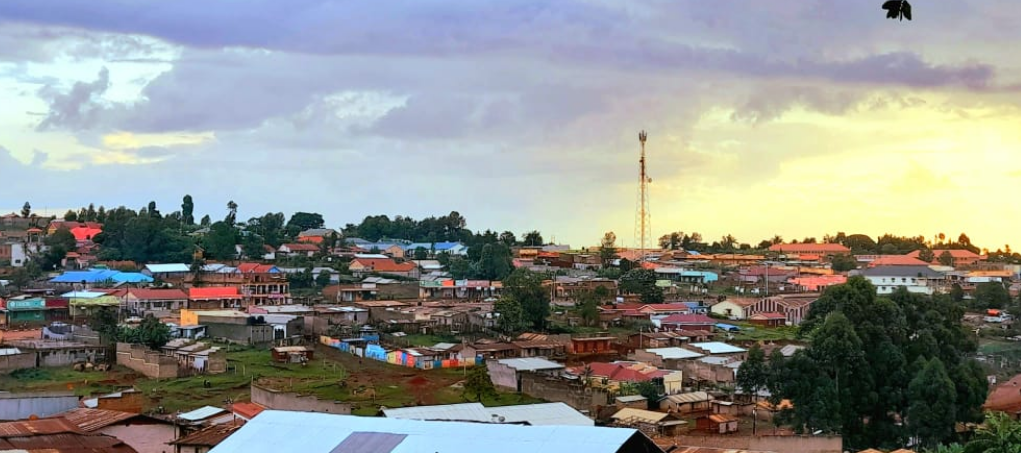

- Flag

- District location in Uganda
- Coordinates: 01°24′N 34°27′E
- Country: Uganda
- Region: Eastern Uganda
- Sub-region: Sebei sub-region
- Established: 1 February 1962
- Capital: Kapchorwa

Area
  - Land: 354.6 km^{2} (136.9 sq mi)
- Elevation: 1,915 m (6,283 ft)

Population (2014 Census)
  - Total: 104,580.
  - Density: 309.9/km^{2} (803/sq mi)
- Time zone: UTC+3 (EAT)

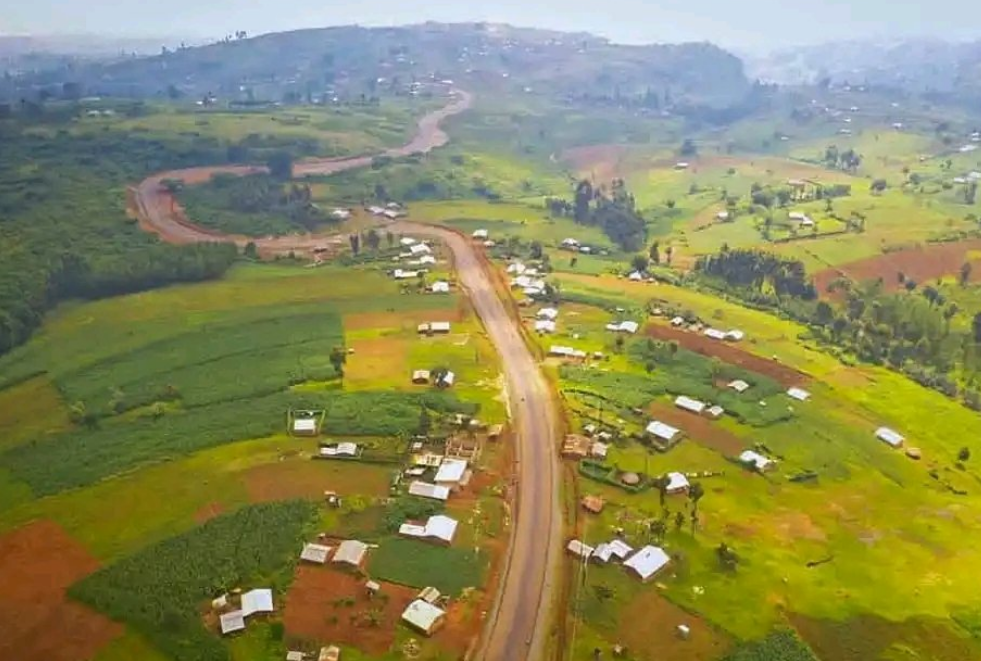
Kapchorwa Upper belt (Kwoti, Kapenguria)

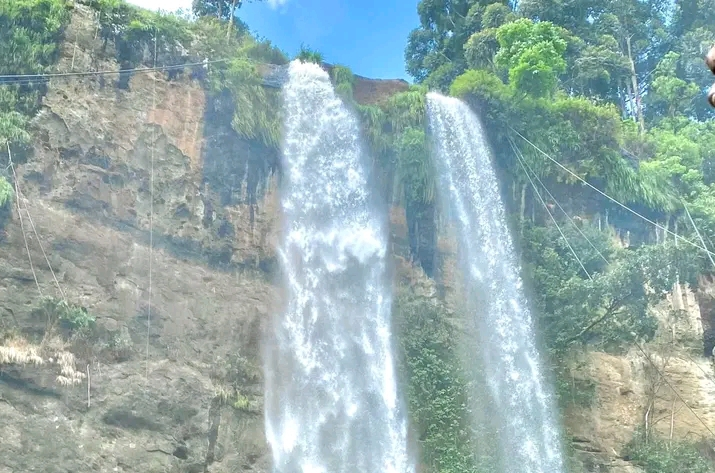
Sipi water falls is located in Kapchorwa District in Eastern Uganda

Kapchorwa District is a district in the Eastern Region of Uganda. The town of Kapchorwa is the district's main municipal, administrative, and commercial center, and is the site of the district headquarters. It is also the home district of Stephen Kiprotich, the men's marathon gold medalist at the 2012 Summer Olympics, and Joshua Cheptegei, the men's 5,000 m gold medalist at the 2021 Summer Olympics in Tokyo.

== Location ==
The district is bordered by Kween District to the northeast and east, Sironko District to the south, and Bulambuli District to the west and northeast. The district headquarters at Kapchorwa, which means "home of friends", are located approximately 65 kilometres (40 mi), by road, northeast of Mbale, the nearest large city. The district is approximately 295 kilometres (183 mi) northeast of Kampala, the capital and largest city of Uganda. The coordinates of the district are 01 24N, 34 27E.

== Overview ==
Under the colonial administration, Kapchorwa District was Sebei County, located in North Bugisu in the now defunct Bukedi District. Kapchorwa was granted district status on 1 February 1962, shortly before Uganda became an independent country.

Kapchorwa District is home mostly to Kalenjin peoples, including the sub-groups Sabiny, Pokot, and Nandi. They were mainly cattle keepers in the late 1960s, but that changed when their northern neighbors, the Karamojong, raided most of their cattle and displaced hundreds of people. The populations most affected lived along the Kapchorwa plains; particularly in Ngenge Sub-County of Kapchorwa District and in Bukwo District. This displacement of the population has resulted in abject poverty among the affected households. People have been forced to live in Internally Displaced People camps, with very limited resources.

In 2005, Kongasis County was split off of the district to form Bukwo District. In 2010, more territory was peeled off to form Kween District. Together, Kapchorwa District, Bukwo District, and Kween District comprise the Sebei sub-region, home to an estimated 200,000 according to the 2002 national census.

== Population ==
In 1991, the national population census estimated the district population at 48,700. The 2002 national census estimated the population at 74,300, with an annual growth rate of 4.5 percent. In 2012, it was estimated that the population had grown to about 114,100. In August 2014, the national population census enumerated the population at 104,580.

== Economic activities ==
Subsistence agriculture is the main economic activity in Kapchorwa District. Crops grown include the following:

- Millet
- Potatoes
- Beans
- Simsim
- Sunflower
- Cotton
- Coffee
- Wheat
- Tomatoes
- Cabbage
- Passion fruit
- Onions
- Tourism

Animal husbandry is practised; the livestock domesticated are mainly cattle, goats, and chickens.

== See also ==
- Sebei
