= Bulambuli District =

- District
- District location in Uganda
- Coordinates: 01°22′N 34°09′E
- Country: Uganda
- Region: Eastern Region, Uganda
- Sub-division: Bugisu sub-region
- Capital: Bulambuli

Area
  - Land: 651.8 km^{2} (251.7 sq mi)

Population (2012 Estimate)
  - Total: 125,400
  - Density: 192.4/km^{2} (498/sq mi)
- Time zone: UTC+3 (EAT)
- Website: www.bulambuli.go.ug

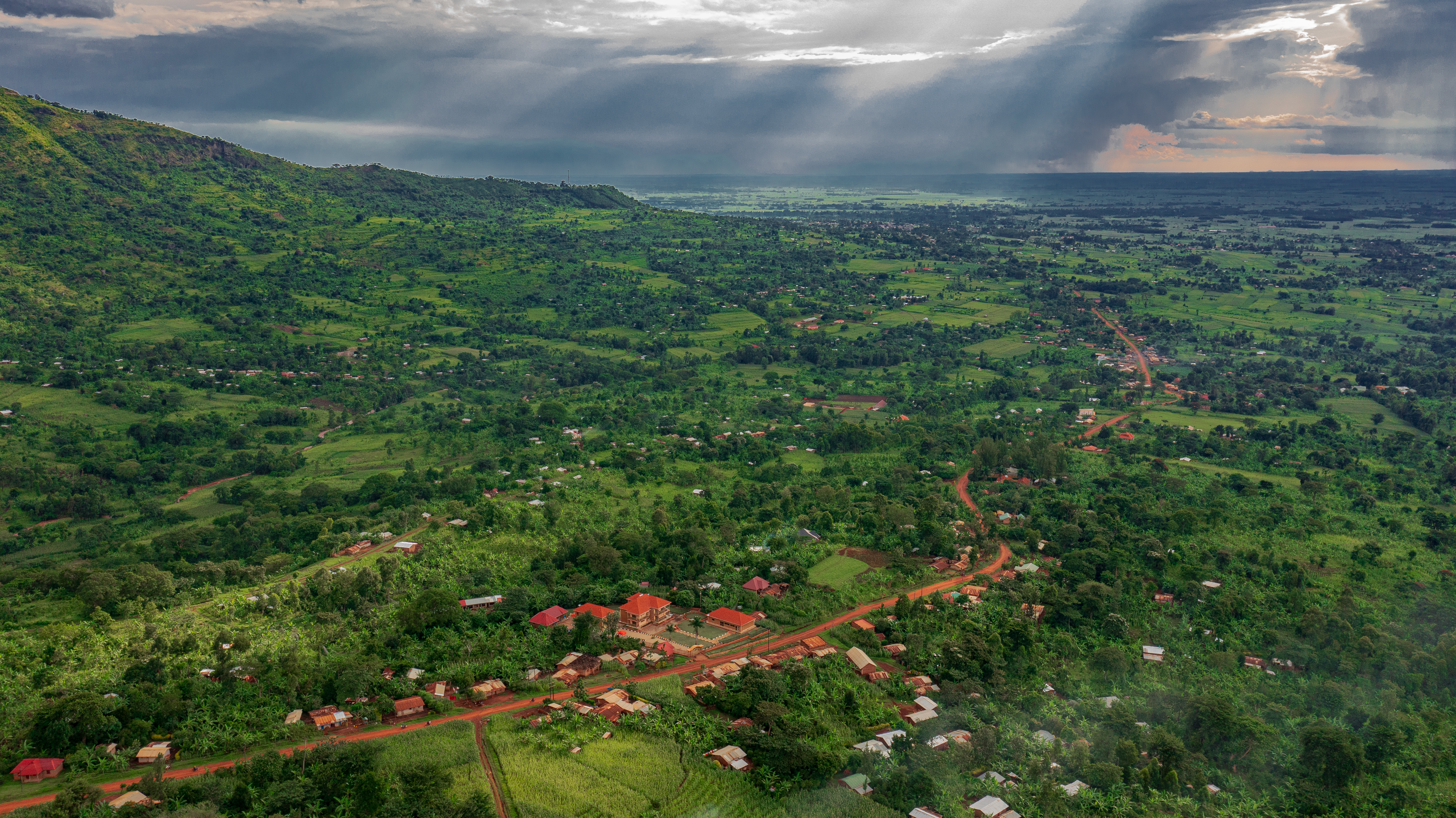
Areas surrounding Sisiyi waterfalls in Bulambuli District.

Bulambuli District is a district in Eastern Uganda. The district is named after 'chief town', Bulambuli, where the district headquarters are located.

== Location ==
Bulambuli District is bordered by Nakapiripirit District to the north, Kapchorwa District to the east, Sironko District to the south and Bukedea District to the west. Bulambuli, the district headquarters, is located approximately 32 kilometres (20 mi), by road, northeast of Mbale, the largest city in the sub-region. The coordinates of the district are:01 22N, 34 09E.

This district is further divided in different administrative divisions.

=== Bulabuli county ===
There are several sub counties under this county as below.

1. Bukhalu
2. Bulambuli town council
3. Bumufuni
4. Bunambutye
5. Buyaga town council
6. Bwikhonge
7. Muyembe
8. Nabbongo

=== Elgon county ===
There are seven sub county under Elgon and these include:

1. Bulago
2. Buluganya
3. Bumasobo
4. Lusha
5. Nabiwutulu
6. Simu
7. Sotti

=== Elgon north county ===
For Elgon north county, there are nine sub county.

1. Bufumbo
2. Buginyanya
3. Bulegeni
4. Bulegeni town council
5. Bumugibole
6. Kamu
7. Masira
8. Namisuni
9. Sisiyi

== Overview ==
Bulambuli District was created by Act of the Ugandan Parliament, in 2009, and became operational on 1 July 2010. Prior to that, the district was part of Sironko District. The terrain in the southern part of the district is mountainous and prone to flash flooding. The northern part of the district, closer to Nakapiripirit District, is more dry and is prone to clean water shortages.

== Population ==
In 1991, the national population census estimated the district population at about 64,600. The next national census in 2002 estimated the population of the district at about 97,300. In 2012, the population of Bulambuli District was estimated at 125,400. from 2014 there was 174,513 and 2024 it was 235,391 .

== Economic activities ==
Subsistence agriculture and animal husbandry are the two main economic activities in the district. Crops grown include:

- Matooke
- Cassava
- Rice
- Groundnuts
- Sorghum
- Millet
- Beans

== Prominent people ==
Some of the prominent people from the district include the following:

- Engineer Irene Nafuna Muloni – Electrical engineer, businesswoman and politician. Current Minister of oil, energy and minerals in Uganda's cabinet. Member of Parliament for Bulambuli District Women's Representative in Uganda's 9th parliament (2011–2016).
- Jairus Mukoota Wanyera - A Disability advocate and activist who creates awareness on Spinal Cord Injuries, studied Bachelor of Science in Information Technology at the Uganda Martyrs University. He is also the president of the Uganda Wheelchair Rugby Federation which he founded in 2018. Jairus is an Executive committee member of the African Spinal Cord Injury Network (AFSCIN) and very passionate at Disability Research.

== See also ==
- Bulambuli
- Eastern Uganda
- Uganda Districts
- Bugisu sub-region
- Parliament of Uganda
- Bugisu Co-operative Union Limited
