= Bugisu sub-region =

Coordinates: 01°12′N 34°24′E

Bugisu
- Sub-region of Uganda
- Interactive map of Bugisu
- Country: Uganda
- Region: Eastern Region
- Largest city: Mbale City
- Districts and city (NPHC 2024 reporting): Bududa Bulambuli Manafwa Mbale Mbale City Namisindwa Sironko

Population (2024 census)
  - Total: 1,827,757
  - Density: 741/km^{2} (1,920/sq mi)
- Time zone: UTC+3 (EAT)

Bugisu sub-region is a sub-region in the Eastern Region of Uganda. In national statistics, it is one of the sub-region groupings used for census tabulation and planning. The sub-region lies on the western slopes and foothills of Mount Elgon along the Uganda–Kenya border.

Bugisu sub-region consists of the following districts:

- Bududa District
- Bulambuli District
- Manafwa District
- Mbale District
- Namisindwa District
- Sironko District

The sub-region is home mainly to the Gisu people, also called Bagisu, (singular is Mugisu). The Bagisu speak Lugisu, a dialect of Lumasaba, a Bantu language. Lugisu is very similar to the Bukusu language spoken of the Bukusu people of Kenya.

According to the 2002 national census, the Bugisu sub-region was home to an estimated 1 million people at that time.

The sub-region is co-terminus with the cultural Bugisu Kingdom.

== Geography ==
Bugisu includes highland and mid-altitude landscapes associated with Mount Elgon. Mount Elgon National Park protects the higher slopes of the mountain on the Uganda–Kenya border, with a protected area of 1,145 km² and peak elevation of 4,321 m (Wagagai).

== Administrative units ==
In the NPHC 2024 reporting framework, Bugisu sub-region comprises Bududa, Bulambuli, Manafwa, Mbale, Mbale City, Namisindwa, and Sironko. The 2024 census profile reports 15 counties, 176 subcounties, and 974 parishes or wards across these local governments.

Namisindwa District became operational on 1 July 2017. Mbale City became operational on 1 July 2020.

== Demographics ==
According to the National Population and Housing Census profile for Bugisu, the sub-region recorded a household population of 1,803,280 and a non-household population of 24,477, giving a total of 1,827,757 in 2024. The profile reports 446,015 households and an average household size of 4.0.

Selected 2024 indicators reported for Bugisu include:

- Children (0–17 years): 867,572.
- Youth (15–24 years): 391,787.
- Working age group (14–64 years): 1,062,193.
- Older persons (60+ years): 115,864.
- Total fertility rate (15–49 years): 4.7.
- Population density: 741 persons per km².

The same census profile shows a total population of 1,469,892 in 2014 and 1,827,757 in 2024 for Bugisu sub-region.

Population by district and city in the Bugisu sub-region (2014 and 2024)
Local government	Type	Population (2014)	Population (2024)	Source
Bududa	District	210,173	268,970	
Bulambuli	District	174,513	235,391	
Manafwa	District	149,544	186,917	
Mbale	District	222,343	290,356	
Mbale City	City	266,617	290,414	
Namisindwa	District	204,281	257,346	
Sironko	District	242,421	298,363	

== Economy ==
Agriculture is a major source of livelihoods in Bugisu. Arabica coffee from the Mount Elgon area is graded and marketed under Mt Elgon and Bugisu-related grades in Uganda’s coffee standards and trade practice.

The Bugisu Co-operative Union (BCU) was registered in July 1954 and is a long-running cooperative institution associated with coffee marketing in and around Bugisu, with headquarters in Mbale. Uganda Coffee Development Authority export reporting lists “Bugisu C” among Arabica grades and reports realised export prices by grade in its monthly market reports.

== Culture and languages ==
Bugisu is closely associated with the Bagisu (also known as Bamasaba). Lugisu is one of the varieties of the Masaba language (Lumasaba).

The Imbalu ceremonies are a major cultural practice among Bamasaaba communities in eastern Uganda. UNESCO documents Imbalu as a living tradition and cultural practice, including community rites that culminate in traditional circumcision of initiates. WHO reporting on public health engagement in the region describes Imbalu as a widely observed ceremony held in a two-year cycle, commonly between August and December.

== Environment and risk ==
Parts of Bugisu on the Mount Elgon slopes face recurring landslide risk. Peer-reviewed public health and disaster assessments describe the 1 March 2010 Mount Elgon landslide in Bududa District as a major event that caused large loss of life and displacement, and triggered emergency WASH and public health response needs.

== Major settlements ==
Mbale City is the largest urban centre in the sub-region and became operational as a city on 1 July 2020.

== See also ==
- Regions of Uganda
- Districts of Uganda
- Mount Elgon
- Mbale City
