= Gwere people =

Bagwere
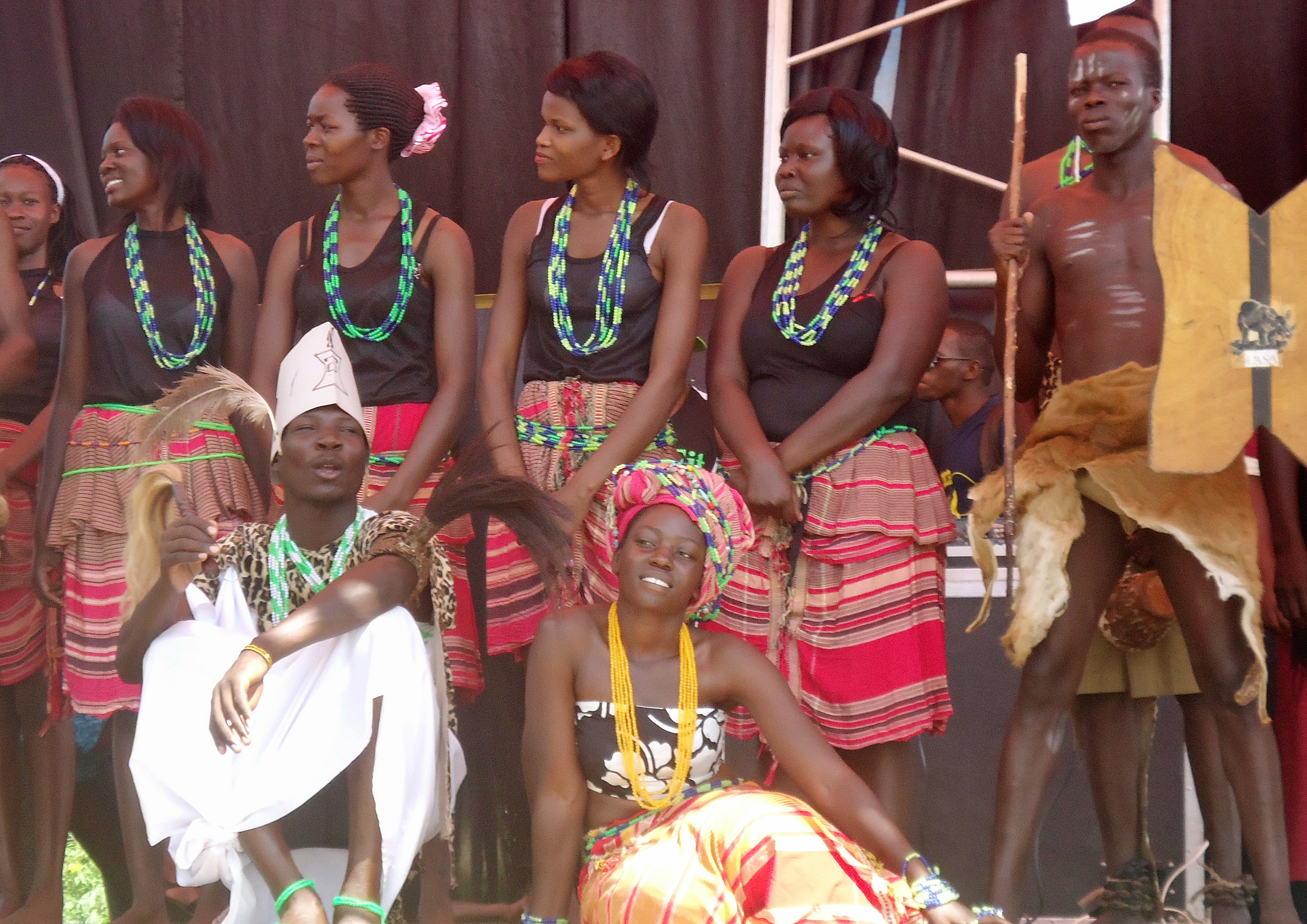

Total population
- 621,150 (2014 Census)

Regions with significant populations
- Uganda

Languages
- Lugwere, English

Religion
- Christianity, African Traditional Religion, Islam

Related ethnic groups
- Basoga, Baganda and other Bantu peoples

The Gwere people, also called Bagwere, are a Bantu ethnic group in Uganda. They are among the 65 ethnic societies of Uganda. Gwere is the root word, and the people are referred to as Bagwere (endonym) or Mugwere (singular). According to the 2002 Census of Uganda, 23.6% of Bagwere are Roman Catholic, 46.8% are Anglican (Church of Uganda), 23.9% are Muslim and 3.1% are Pentecostal.

== Location ==
The Bagwere occupy an area of 2,388.3 km in eastern Uganda, mostly in Budaka District, Pallisa District and Kibuku District, Butebo District, where they make up over 80% of the population. They have the Bagisu, the Basoga, the Balamogi and the Iteso, the Banyole and the Jopadhola (Badama) as their neighbors. The city of Mbale is home to some Bagwere. Bagwere are also found in the following towns in Eastern Uganda: Pallisa, Budaka, Kibuku, Kagumu, Kamonkoli, Kadama, Kabweri, Iki-Iki, Bulangira, Kaderuna, Tirinyi, Butebo and Kakoro.

The Bagwere are said to have emigrated to their present area from Bunyoro and Toro, and travelled along Lake Kyoga, crossing River Mpologoma. For this reason all the tribes that settled along the shores Kyoga like; Baluli, Bakenye, Balamogi have a similar language to Lugwere. Their initial area of settlement has shrunk considerably as the Iteso and the Bagisu have pushed the Bagwere's frontiers inwards.

The language of the Bagwere is Lugwere

== Cultural structure ==
The Bagwere are one of the 65 indigenous communities in Uganda, according to the Third Schedule of Uganda's Constitution (Uganda's indigenous communities as at 1 February 1926).

The Bagwere have many clans originating from different tribes, including the following:

this history as if begins from 1985, where the Abalangira Bakimadu/Namadu/nakyeri e.g koire, Kyabanamaizi, etc

•Mubbala Kinyu Samuku Balamu Balalaka-Bengoma Clan •Tazenya Henry Kamu Bakomolo-Nkobyokobyo Clan •Kiore George William Bangwere Clan •Kagino Obadia Bakaligwoko-Banamei Clan •Tawonia Wilson Bapalama Clan •Maiso Jonathan Kwiri Bade.uke Clan •Mulaiguli J. Samson Bakatikoko-Katikati Clan •Mutono Eriamu Balunde Clan •Wanzige Abel Balocho Clan •Namoni Nathan Balalaka-Bakomba Clan •Kirya Badru Babulanga Clan •Gabbengere Christopher Balemeri (Nkembo) Clan •Mwereza Gastavas Bakabweri Clan •Kirya Geoffrey Bakaligwoko-Bakituti Clan •Wagombolya Amos Banyekero Clan •Gwaku Yeku Esau Badaka Clan •Padere K. Claudius Basobya Clan •Kaali Akabu Bagolya Clan •Mongosi Yokolamu Basikwe Clan •Kanku Francis Bakaligwoko-Bagolo Clan •Wasugirya Fred Bob Baikomba Clan •Kabala Malijani Baganza Clan •Dr. Kiryapawo Tomasi Baloki Clan •Mwanika Kirizanto Banghole Clan •Muwandiki Jamada Balumba Clan •Bulolo Patrick Bakawolya Clan •Kamusaiza Stephen Balalaka-Bayumbu Clan •Waletelerya Abudu Badoba Clan •Mbulambago James Bagema Clan •Nabbola Abimereki Badukulo Clan •Mbulakyalo Alozio Balabya Clan •Tazenya Tomasi Bakatikoko-Bakidi Clan •Muluga John Bosco Baigembe Clan •Musayenka Dominic Bakyesa Clan •Okou Danieri Bakamugewo Clan •Guloba Peter Balefe Clan •Abenga Kamya Abed Bakomolo-Bombo Clan •Hajji Nfunyeku Jafali Balemeri Clan •Kirya Felix William Banongo Clan •Talyankona Yokosani Bawunga Clan •Mukonge Issa Babeera Clan •Seebe Twaha Bakyabulya Clan •Nduga Wilson Banaminto Clan •Kapisa Michael Bakaligwoko-Barweta Clan •Hajji Nabwali Saibu Bafukanyi Clan •Sisye Joram Bakalaga Clan •Gantwase Efulaimu Baluba Clan •Kadugala Isaa Balalaka-Bakidi Clan •Wabwire Lala James Balala Clan •Gole Nicholas Banamwera Clan •Kisense Samuel Bansaka Clan •Ochola Ben Baibere Clan •Wadugu George Baseta Clan •Taaya Peter Bagamole Clan •Mugoda Ahamada Banyolo Clan •Mivule Nimrod Balinda Clan •Sajjabi S. Sulaiman Abengo Clan •Wulira Abudalla Batego Clan •Kasinyire Peter Bamango Clan •Keni Bulasio Basobya Clan •Mbulakyalo Geresom Baumo Clan •Mugoya Samuel Bakoolia Clan •Ntawo Boniface Balomi Clan •Nakibbe Peter Bagoye Clan •Onyait Zerubaberi Bakatikoko-Izima Clan •Mujere Hamuzata Bakambe Clan •Okurut Nikanoli Balalaka-Abanyana Clan •Nabesya Jafali Banswenza Clan •Tudde Abuneri Bakinomo Clan •Napoma Christopher Bamesula Clan •Onepuru Amuza Bangokho Clan •Bonyo Talikula Stephen Bakaduka Clan •Mukidi Moses Banyulya Clan •Wakamba Samwiri Bakone Clan •Wampula Rovers Bakaligwoko-Bayesi Clan •Mudenya Sowali Baerya Clan •Kitebe Twaha Boluko Clan •Ochomo Michael Bakaligwoko-Baseta Clan •Kamiza Abudu Basuswa-Abampiti Clan •Yusufu Sadi Baisanga Clan •Kidimu Bruhan Batenga Clan •Igandi Ben Balemo Clan •Mbulakyalo Alozio Balabya Clan •Wenge Anthony Bayangu Clan

All clans of Bagwere are headed by a clan leader or the chief, and one of the clan leaders is elected to be the "IKUMBANIA" and 86 clan leaders of Bagwere subscribed to the Constitution of the "OBWA IKUMBAANIA BWA BUGWERE" of 14 November 2009 and elected the first chief cultural leader of the Bagwere, His Highness KINTU SAMUKU BALAMU.

Intermarriage among members of the same clan is prohibited, as is the custom in most Bantu cultures.

The Bagwere culture has traditions that include the celebration of births, marriages, and deaths. Girls may marry as young as fourteen years of age, when they are usually solicited by a boy who is willing to pay a bride-price (cattle) to her parents. Once parents agree, the boy's mother will arrive to pick up the girl and bring her to her husband-to-be. The ceremony involves the ritual washing of the girl's back by her mother-in-law. This ceremony is celebrated with music played on traditional instruments made out of natural substances like lukeme (thumb piano) made from clay.

== Education ==
The Bagwere are few in number but many are very well educated. Over fifty of them hold either PhD's or master's degrees, degrees and diplomas from world-class reputable universities and other universities and institutions. Some notable Bagwere personalities over the years include:

- Kirya Balaki Kebba, Minister of State (for Security) Office of the President, NRC Member, Elected Member of Parliament 1962; Appointed Minister without portfolio; Minister of Works 1963; Minister of Mineral and Water.
- George Kirya, chairman, Uganda Health Services Commission, former vice chancellor of Makerere University, and former High Commissioner to the United Kingdom
- William Mukama, teacher and politician
- Jennifer Namuyangu, former State Minister for Water Resources (2006–2011) & former MP for Pallisa District Women's Representative (2001–2011)
- Jeremiah Twatwa - Physician & politician, the elected Member of Parliament for "Iki-Iki County", Budaka District (2011–2016)
- Mulabbi Elliot - Engineer and politician, former district engineer Pallisa and Budaka districts, commissioner MoW eastern region.
- Botyo George- Engineer/ construction manager cantilever contractors limited
- Sowali Mading Mwanga - Engineer & Aviator, former air traffic controller (ATC) at Entebbe International Airport & one of the former pioneer district engineers for greater Pallisa district and former Budaka district service commission member.

== Economic activities ==
The main economic activity of the Bagwere is subsistence crop agriculture and animal husbandry. To a lesser extent, fishing, fish farming and bee keeping are increasingly practiced in Pallisa District. The major crops include:

- Cassava
- Millet
- Sorghum
- Maize
- Groundnuts
- Beans
- Peas
- Sweet potatoes
- Rice
- Cotton
- Sunflower
- Soybeans
- Bananas
- Matooke

Cattle, goats, sheep, poultry, pigs, are some of the animals raised in the district. The district is further blessed with nine (9) minor lakes that comprise part of the Lake Kyoga system. The following are the nine lakes:

- Lake Lemwa
- Lake Kawi
- Lake Nakwa
- Lake Meito
- Lake Geme
- Lake Omunuo
- Lake Nyanzala
- Lake Nyaguo

There are nine (9) stocked fish farms in the district. Fish farming offers a big potential to increase the supply of fish for the population and hence improve on the nutrition of the population. Fish species include:

- Carp
- Oreochromis niloticus
- Clarias spp.

== See also ==
- Pallisa District
- Pallisa
- Basoga
