= Mariam Naigaga =

Ugandan politician (born 1979)

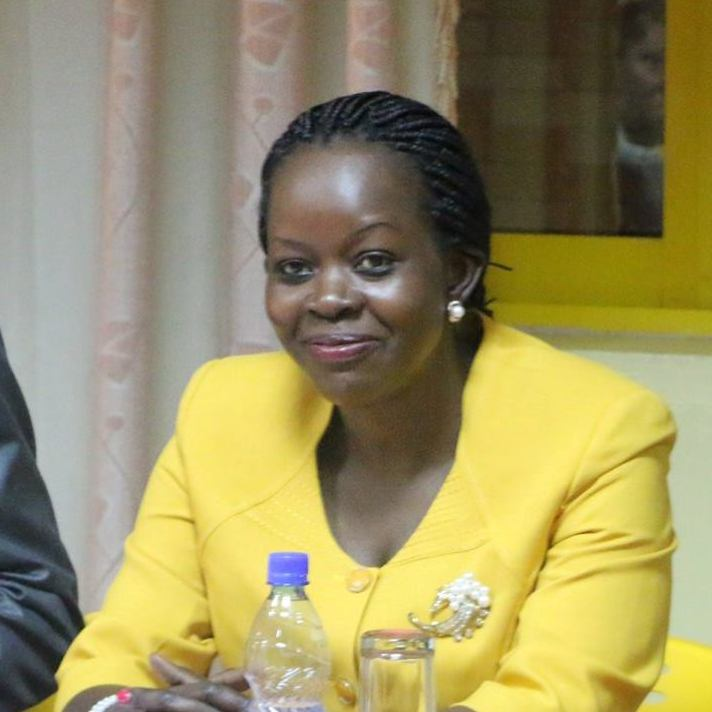
- Naigaga at a human-rights event in 2016

Honorable

Personal details
- Born: Mariam Naigaga; 22 May 1979 (age 47) Namutumba, Uganda
- Party: National Resistance Movement
- Education: Makerere University (BSc Statistics) (Master of Finance)
- Occupation: Banker, politician
- Known for: politics

Mariam Naigaga (born 22 May 1979) is a Ugandan banker, statistician and politician. She was the Woman Representative for Namutumba District in the 10th Parliament and is a member of National Resistance Movement (NRM), the ruling political party in Uganda.

She serves on the special Presidential Advisory Committee on Budget (PACOB) and is a member of the Budget Committee and the Committee on Finance, Planning and Economic Development in Parliament.

Naigaga is a member of the Parliamentary Forum on Climate Change (PFCC), the Uganda Parliamentary Forum for Children (UPFC), the Uganda Women's Parliamentary Association (UWOPA), and the Uganda Parliamentary Forum on Social Protection (UPFSP). Additionally, she is the NRM secretary general for Namutumba District, the treasurer of the NRM Parliamentary Caucus and the secretary of the Busoga Parliamentary Caucus.

Naigaga is a former branch manager of Centenary Bank where she secured employment over a thirteen-year period from 2003 up until 2015 when she resigned to join elective politics. She is also a member of the Uganda Institute of Banking and Financial Services (UIBFS) and the East African Banking School.

== Early life and education ==
Naigaga was born in Namutumba District, Busoga sub-region, on 22 May 1979 in a Muslim family of the Basoga. She had her primary education in her home district of Namutumba acquiring her PLE certification in 1992.

Naigaga then attended Bugobi High School for her O-Level education, attaining her UCE certification in 1996, and then St. Mathias Kalemba Senior Secondary School Nazigo for her A-Level education, where she acquired her UACE certification in 1998.

Naigaga further advanced to Makerere University where she graduated in 2002 with a Bachelor of Science in statistics. Still in the same institution of higher education, she acquired a Master in Finance in 2011.

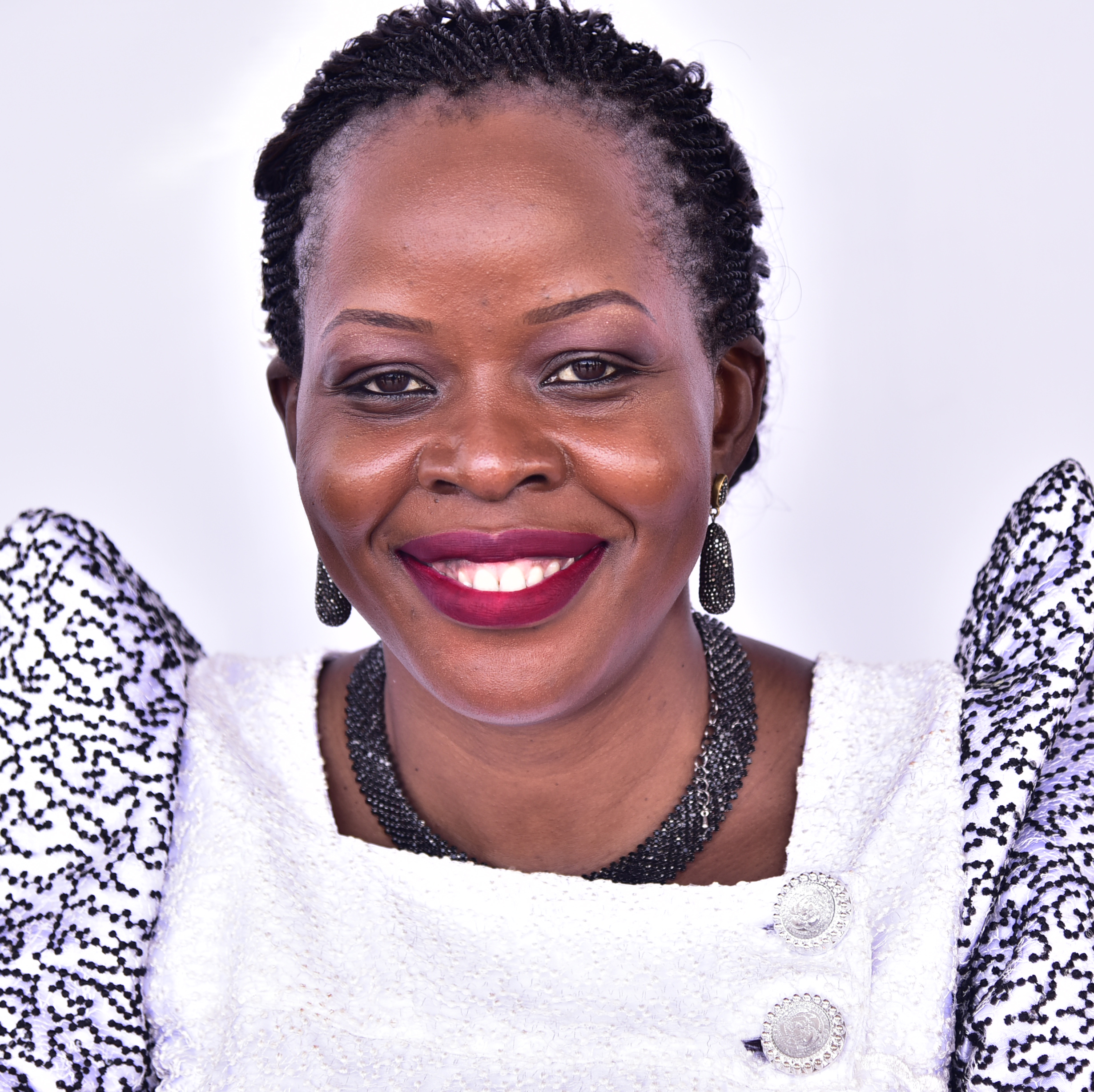
Mariam Naigaga

== In banking ==
Upon attaining her bachelor's degree, Naigaga secured employment at Centenary Bank where she served for thirteen years from 2003 to 2015, acquiring extensive knowledge in financial management in the process. She started out as a bank officer from 2003 to 2007. She was then promoted to branch supervisor, a position she held up to 2009 when she was again promoted to assistant branch manager in 2009. In 2011, she was elevated to branch manager up until her resignation in 2015 to join elective politics.

== Politics ==
Following her resignation from Centenary Bank and subsequently kick-starting her political career, Naigaga bid for the Namutumba District Woman Representative seat on the NRM ticket and won both the NRM party primaries in 2015 and the general elections in 2016 to become a member of the 10th Parliament for the Pearl of Africa.

In the 10th Parliament, Naigaga serves on the special Presidential Advisory Committee on Budget (PACOB) and is a member of the Budget Committee and the Committee on Finance, Planning and Economic Development. She is also a member of the Parliamentary Forum on Climate Change (PFCC), the Uganda Parliamentary Forum for Children (UPFC), the Uganda Women's Parliamentary Association (UWOPA) and the Uganda Parliamentary Forum on Social Protection (UPFSP).

In 2021 she was re elected as member of parliament.

== See also ==
- Namutumba District
- National Resistance Movement
- Parliament of Uganda
