= Busembatya, Uganda =

Busembatya
- Map of Uganda showing the location of Busembatya.
- Coordinates: 00°46′30″N 33°37′30″E
- Country: Uganda
- Region: Eastern Region
- Sub-region: Busoga sub-region
- District: Iganga District
- Elevation: 1,110 m (3,640 ft)

Population (2014 census)
  - Total: 14,431
- Time zone: UTC+3 (EAT)

Busembatya, sometimes spelled Busembatia, is a town in the Eastern Region of Uganda.

== Location ==
Busembatya is located on the northern edge of Iganga District. The town is located on the main Iganga–Tirinyi–Kamonkoli–Mbale Road. Its closest neighboring metropolitan area is the town of Namutumba in Namutumba District, a distance of approximately 10 kilometres (6 mi), by road, northeast of Busembatya. This location is approximately 28 kilometres (17 mi), northeast of Iganga, where the district headquarters are located.

Busembatya is approximately 65.5 kilometres (41 mi), by road, northeast of Jinja, the largest city in the Busoga sub-region. The coordinates of the town are 0°46'30.0"N, 33°37'30.0"E (Latitude:0.7750; Longitude:33.6250). Busembatya has an average elevation of 1,110 metres (3,640 ft), above sea level.

== Population ==
The Uganda national census of 2002 counted the population of the town at 11,553. In 2010, the Uganda Bureau of Statistics (UBOS) estimated the population at 15,200. In 2011, UBOS estimated the population at 15,700. In 2014, the national census and household survey, the population of Busembatya was enumerated at 14,431.

== Overview ==
Busembatya, which sits on a plateau surrounded by swamps, is known for growing rice. Busembatya's rice mills served most of Busoga before other areas in the sub-region were connected to the national power grid.

The town's inhabitants and residents in the surrounding villages keep domestic livestock which they allow to roam the streets, unattended. The local leaders have threatened to arrest animal owners who cannot zero-graze their animals.

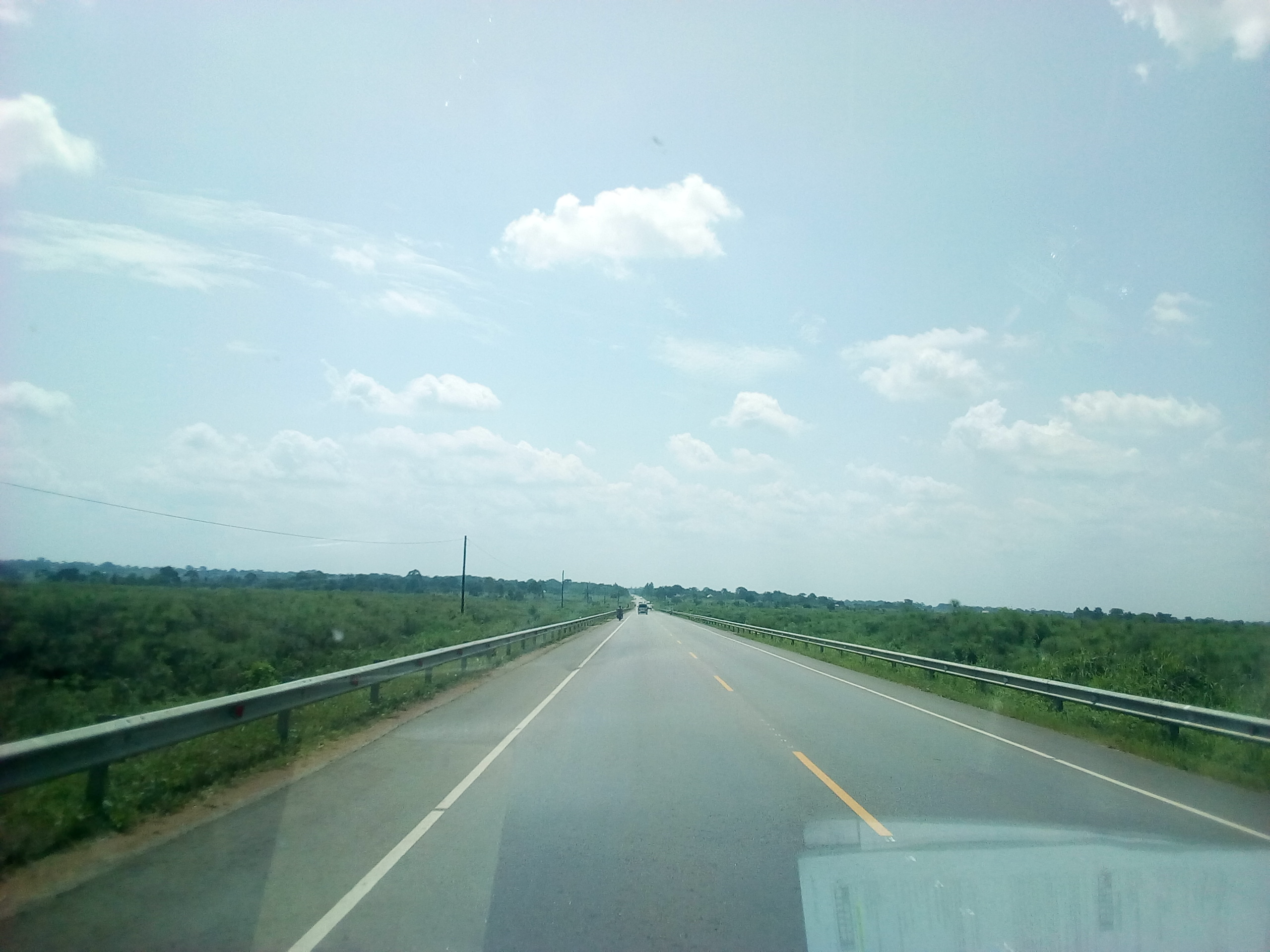
Tirinyi Mbale Highway with blue Sky covered in spotted clouds in Buembatya District

The town is home to Busembatya Town Council Football Club (Busembatya TC FC), which plays in the Federation of Uganda Football Associations (FUFA) Zone 10 mini soccer league.

== See also ==
- List of cities and towns in Uganda
- Busoga sub-region
