= Iganga–Tirinyi–Kamonkoli–Mbale Road =

Road in Uganda

Coordinates: 01°00′07″N 33°45′51″E

Route information
- Length: 62 mi (100 km)

Major junctions
- West end: Iganga
- Namutumba; Tirinyi; Kamonkoli
- East end: Mbale

Location
- Country: Uganda

Highway system
- Roads in Uganda

The Iganga–Tirinyi–Kamonkoli–Mbale Road, also known as the Nakalama–Tirinyi–Kamonkoli–Mbale Road, is a road in the Eastern Region of Uganda, connecting the towns of Iganga in Iganga District, Namutumba in Namutumba District, Tirinyi in Kibuku District, Kamonkoli in Budaka District, and Mbale in Mbale District.

== Location ==
The road starts at Nakalama, a suburb of Iganga, on the Jinja–Tororo Highway, approximately 45 kilometres (28 mi) east of Jinja. The road proceeds in a north-easterly direction, through Namutumba, Tirinyi, and Kamonkoli before ending at Mbale, a total distance of about 101 kilometres (63 mi).

== Overview ==
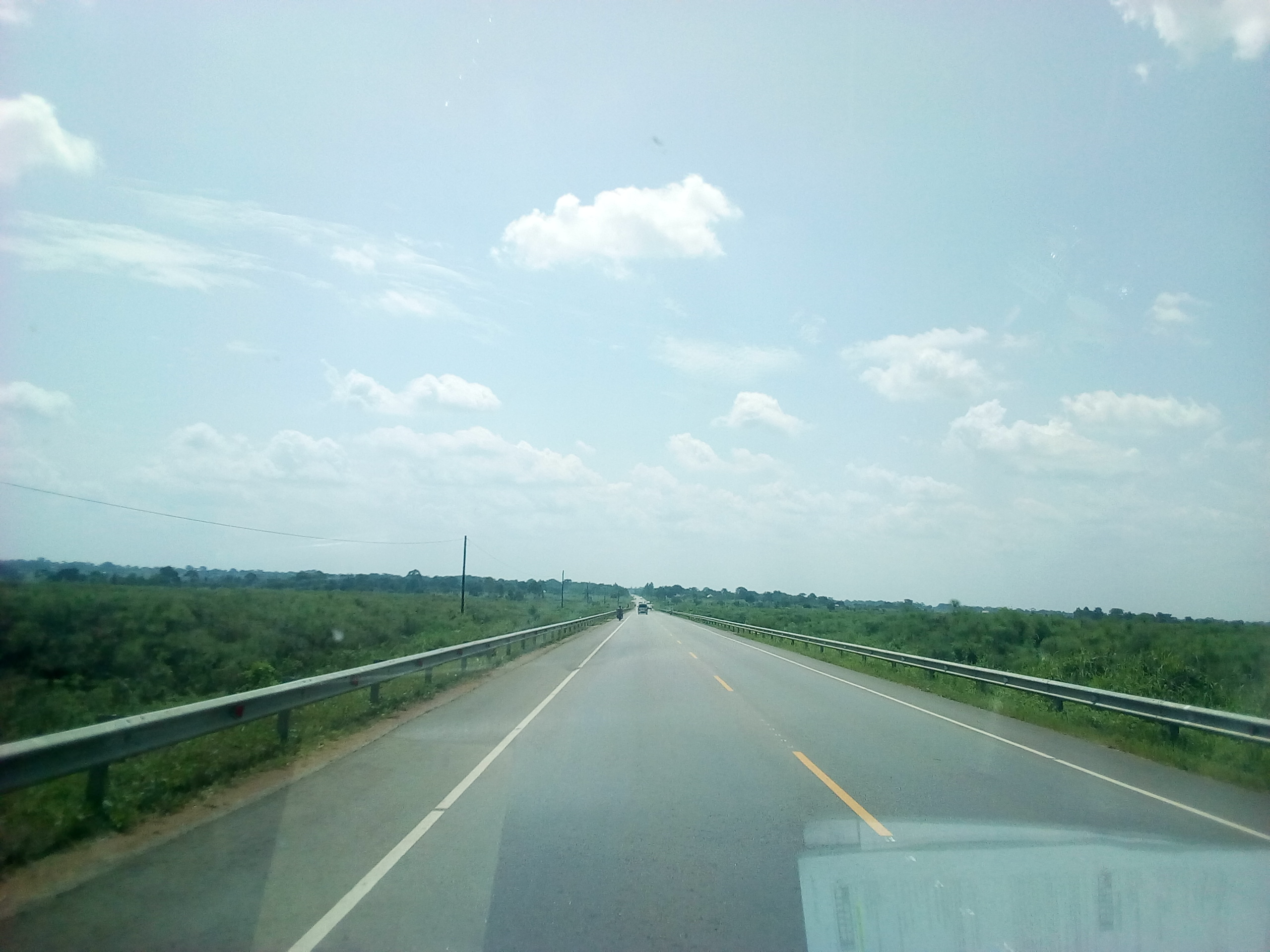
Tirinyi Mbale Highway with blue Sky covered in spotted clouds in Buembatya District

This road is an important national road, under the supervision of the Uganda National Roads Authority (UNRA).

The road was upgraded to class II bitumen surface before 2001, with loan assistance from the African Development Bank. Since the upgrade, the road has been plagued by recurrent surface erosion, sinkholes, and vandalism.

The government of Uganda (GOU), through UNRA, plans to fund a rehabilitation of this road. As of April 2015, the road rehabilitation project was classified as "Ongoing", fully funded by GOU.

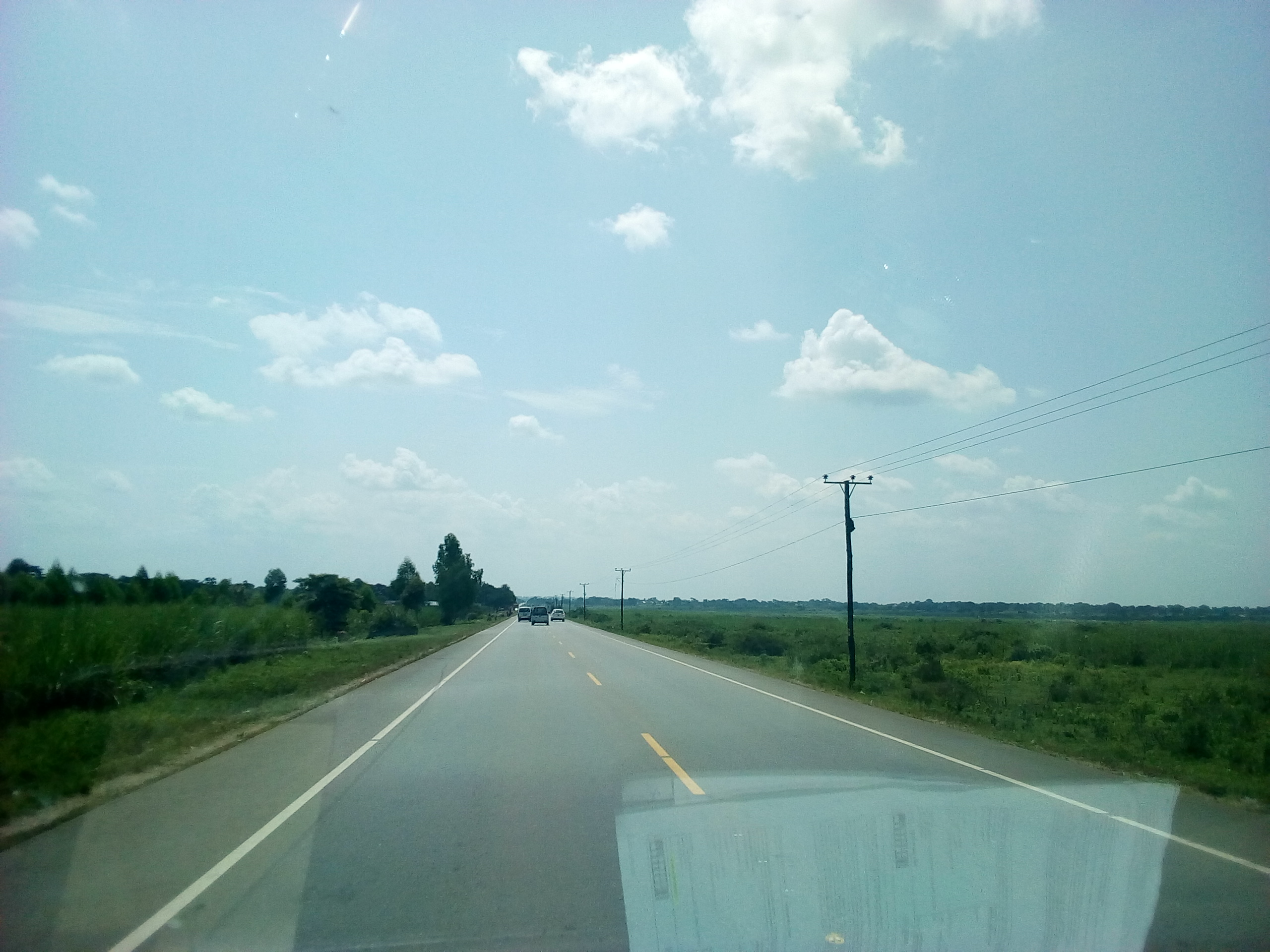
Mbale Tirinyi highway in Eastern Uganda

On 21 January 2022, the upgraded and resurfaced road was commissioned by Robinah Nabbanja, the Prime Minister of Uganda. The 99.3 kilometres (62 mi) single carriageway transport corridor was rehabilitated and improved to class II bitumen standard by Dott Services, fully funded by he Ugandan government. The rehabilitated road's projected lifespan is 15 years from date of completion.

== See also ==
- List of roads in Uganda
