= Namutumba, Uganda =

Namutumba
- Location in Uganda
- Coordinates: 00°50′06″N 33°41′06″E
- Country: Uganda
- Region: Eastern Region of Uganda
- Sub-region: Busoga sub-region
- District: Namutumba District
- Elevation: 3,724 ft (1,135 m)

Population (2020 Estimate)
  - Total: 22,600

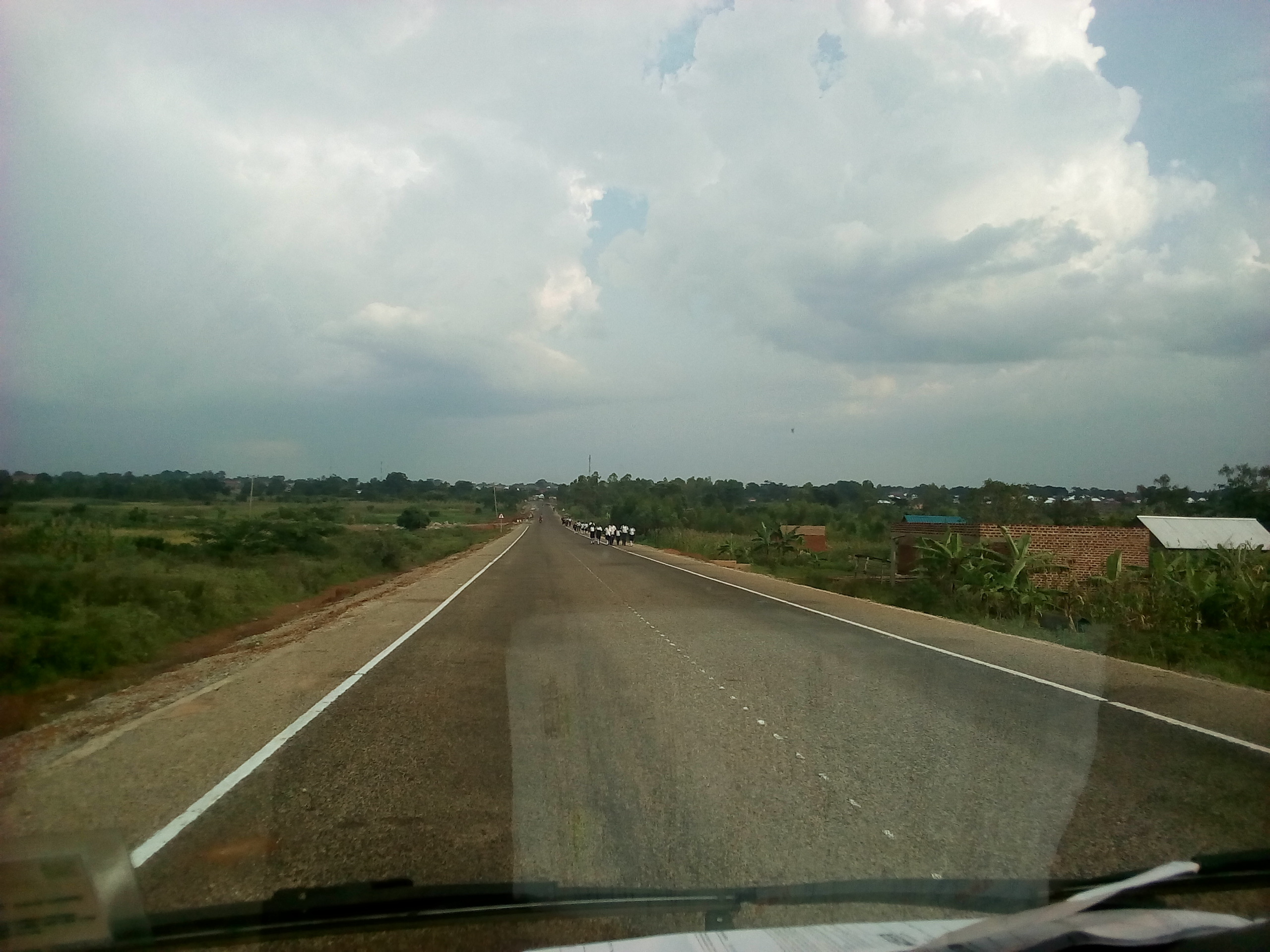
Tirinyi highway in Namutumba District

Namutumba is a town in the Namutumba District of the Eastern Region of Uganda. It is the main municipal, administrative, and commercial centre of the district.

== Location ==
Namutumba is approximately 75 kilometres (47 mi), by road, northeast of Jinja, the largest city in the Busoga sub-region. This is approximately 38 kilometres (24 mi), by road, northeast of Iganga, the nearest large town. The town of Busembatya in Iganga District, about 10 kilometres (6 mi) to the southwest of Namutumba, is the closest neighboring trading center and has the nearest post office. To the northeast of Namutumba is Tirinyi in Kibuku District, another small town on the main Iganga–Tirinyi–Kamonkoli–Mbale Road. The coordinates of Namutumba are 0°50'06.0"N, 33°41'06.0"E (Latitude:0.8350; Longitude:33.6850). Namutumba Town sits at an average elevation of 1,135 metres (3,724 ft) above mean sea level.

== Population ==
In 2014, the national population census and household survey put the population of Namutumba Town, at 18,736. In 2020, the Uganda Bureau of Statistics (UBOS) estimated the mid-year population of the town at 22,600. The population agency calculated the average annual growth rate of Namutumba's population at 3.31 percent, between 2014 and 2020.

== Points of interest ==
The following additional points of interest lie within the town limits or close to the edges of the town:

1. The offices of Namutumba Town Council

2. The offices of Namutumba District Administration Headquarters

3. Namutumba Central Market

4. Namutumba Community Hospital

5. The Iganga–Mbale Road also Tirinyi Road: the road passes through the middle of town, in a general southwest to northeast direction.

6. Namutumba Islamic Hospital, a 60-bed hospital under development since 2016.

== International relations ==
Namutumba is twinned with the town of Ross-on-Wye, England.

== See also ==
- Busoga sub-region
- Lusoga language
- Basoga
- List of cities and towns in Uganda
