= Pamela Nasiyo Kamugo =

Ugandan Politician (born 1984)

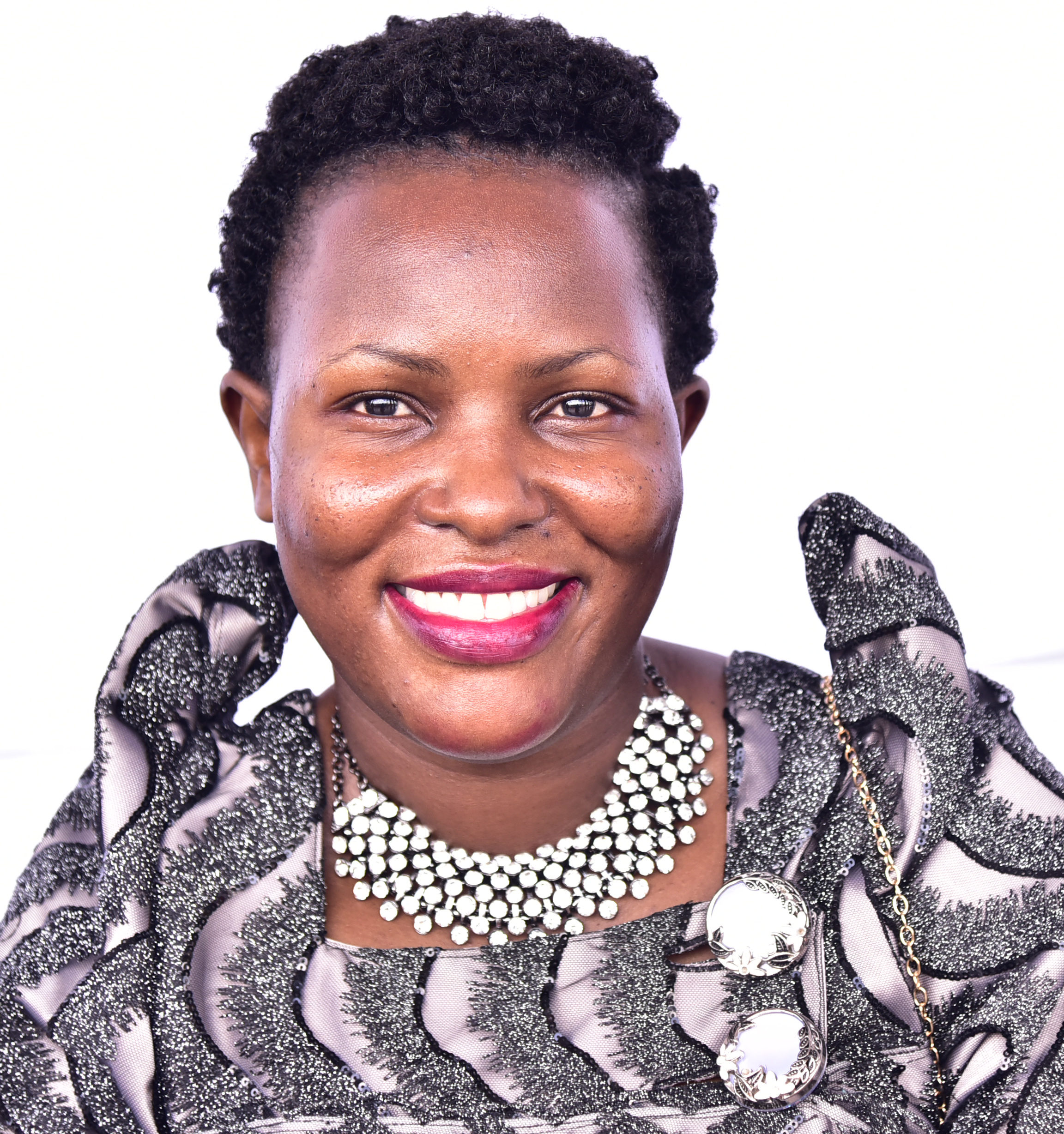
- Born: 23 May 1984 (age 42)
- Citizenship: Uganda
- Education: Kamonkoli mixed primary school St. Johns Secondary School, Ntebetebe Kampala; Uganda Christian University
- Occupations: Politician, social worker and legislator
- Employer(s): Mbale district Budaka district Uganda Women Parliamentary Association; Parliament of Uganda
- Known for: Politics
- Title: Honourable
- Political party: National Resistance Movement

Pamela Nasiyo Kamugo (born on 23 May 1984) is a Ugandan social worker and legislator. As of April 2020, she has served as the elected woman member of parliament for Budaka district in the tenth Parliament of Uganda and eleventh Parliament of Uganda. She is affiliated with the National Resistance Movement, the ruling party of Uganda led by Yoweri Museveni, the country's president

== Early life and education ==
Pamela Nasiyo was born on 23 May 1984. She started her primary education from Kamonkoli mixed primary school completing her primary leaving examinations (PLE) in 1996. She later enrolled at St. Johns Secondary School, Ntebetebe Kampala for her O-level and A-level education, completing her Uganda certificate of education (UCE) in 2000 and Uganda advanced certificate of education (UACE) in 2003. She later joined Uganda Christian University where she graduated with a bachelor's degree in social works and social administration (B.SWASA) in 2007.

== Career ==
Prior to joining elective politics, Kamugo was a social worker in Mbale district.

In 2016, she contested for and won the seat of woman member of parliament for Budaka district, replacing Sarah Kataike Ndoboli, a former minister of State for Luwero Triangle. In the tenth parliament, she serves as the chairperson of the Uganda Women Parliamentary Association (UWOPA). She is also a member of the committees on HIV/AIDS and related diseases as well as that of defense and internal affairs. and the committee on defence and internal affairs.

In 2017, she was arrested alongside three other legislators for "inciting residents to carry out a demonstration over the poor state of Mbale-Tirinyi-Kampala high way".

In 2019, she tabled a motion that resulted in the recalling of Uganda's Ambassador to Burundi over assaulting a female traffic officer.

As member of parliament, Pamela Nasiyo has been involved in several demonstrations, including a protest over the poor state of the Tirinyi road, which connects four districts in eastern Uganda. She also moved a motion in parliament to recall Major-General Matayo Kyaligonza from his posting as ambassador to Burundi for assaulting a female traffic officer on duty.
