= Budaka =

Budaka may refer to:

- Budaka District, Uganda
  - Budaka County, a county in Budaka District
  - Budaka, Uganda, a town and headquarters of the district
