= Juliet Rainer Kafiire =

Ugandan legislator and Member of Parliament

Juliet Rainer Kafiire Honourable

Member of Parliament, Kibuku County

Constituent Assembly Delegate, Kibuku County

Member of Parliament, Kibuku County
- Succeeded by: Saleh Kamba

Deputy President General, DP
- Succeeded by: Fred Mukasa Mbidde

Personal details
- Born: Juliet Kafiire
- Party: Democratic Party (Uganda)
- Children: 3
- Occupation: Politician

Juliet Rainer Kafiire is a Ugandan politician and legislator who represented Kibuku County in Pallisa between 1994 and 2006. She also served as the Deputy President General of Uganda's Democratic Party (DP).

== Career ==
During Uganda's 1994 Ugandan Constituent Assembly election, Kafiire was elected as the delegate to represent Pallisa As a member of the National Caucus for Democracy (NCD), Kafiire was one of the fifty three Constituent Assembly Delegates who refused to endorse the 1995 constitution

Kafiire represented Kibuku County in Uganda's Parliament between 1996 and 2006. She eventually lost this position in the 2006 General Elections to Saleh Kamba who was affiliated to the National Resistance Movement (NRM)

In November 2005, Kafiire was elected as the Deputy President General of Uganda's Democratic Party (DP)

== Personal life ==
Kafiire was married to Joseph Rainer, a German national who died in 2007.

== See also ==
- Democratic Party (Uganda)
- Saleh Kamba
- Pallisa district
