= Tirinyi–Pallisa–Kamonkoli–Kumi Road =

Road in Uganda

Coordinates: 01°09′04″N 33°43′07″E

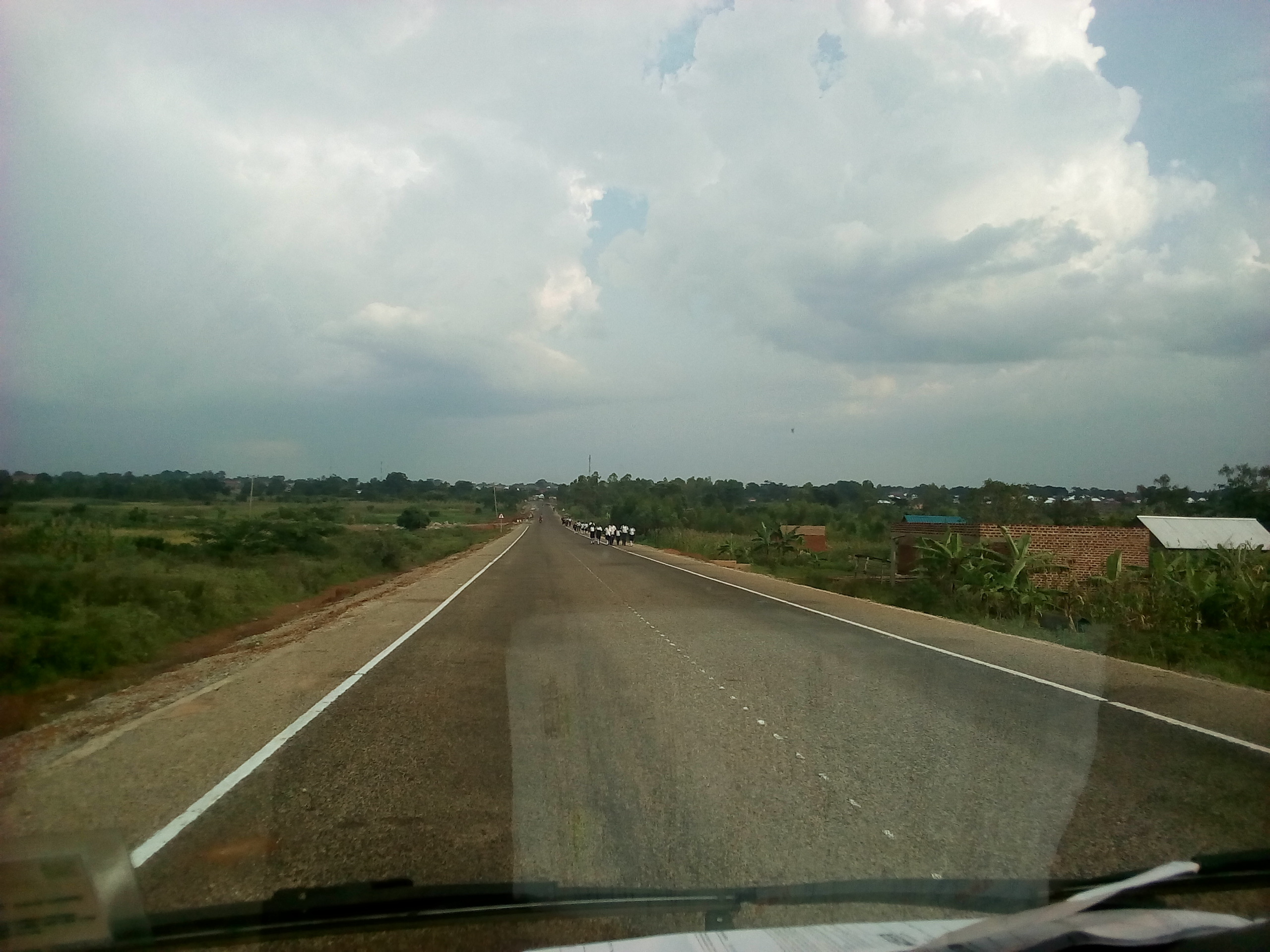

Route information
- Length: 70.1 mi (112.8 km)
- History: Construction started in 2019; Completion expected in 2024

Major junctions
- South end: Tirinyi
- Pallisa; Kamonkoli
- North end: Kumi

Location
- Country: Uganda

Highway system
- Roads in Uganda

The Tirinyi–Pallisa–Kamonkoli–Kumi Road is a road in the Eastern Region of Uganda, connecting the towns of Tirinyi in Kibuku District, Pallisa in Pallisa District, Kamonkoli in Budaka District, and Kumi in Kumi District.

== Location ==
From Tirinyi, the road proceeds in a general northern direction to Pallisa, a distance of approximately 22 kilometres (14 mi). At Pallisa, one branch continues in a northeastern direction to Kumi, approximately 52 kilometres (32 mi) away. Another branch of the road makes a southeasterly turn to Kamonkoli, a distance of approximately 54 kilometres (34 mi). The total contract road distance is quoted as 112 kilometres (70 mi).

== Overview ==
The road links four districts in the Eastern Region, forming an important mode of communication in this part of the country. This road is one of the 138 road projects that have seen on the to-do-list since 1986.

== Upgrade to tarmac ==
In May 2014, the government of Uganda, through the Uganda National Roads Authority, advertised for qualified contractors to bid for the improvement of this road from unimproved gravel surface to class II bitumen surface with shoulders, drainage channels, and culverts. The work is being funded jointly by the Ugandan government and the Islamic Development Bank via a loan. The road upgrade was expected to start in 2016.

The construction contract was awarded to Arab Contractors Limited, at a cost of USh274 billion (approx. US$75 million), funded by a loan from the African Development Bank. Work started in 2019.

In September 2021, Allen Kagina, the executive director of UNRA, announced that the upgrade of this road to class II bitumen standard, had been completed during the 2020/2021 financial year which ended on 30 June 2021.

== See also ==
- List of roads in Uganda
