= Kebba =

Kebba is a given name and surname. Notable people with the name include:

- Kebba Badjie (born 1999), Gambian footballer
- Kebba Ceesay (born 1987), Gambian footballer
- Kebba T. Sanneh (fl. from 2022), Gambian politician
- Kirya Balaki Kebba (1924–1994), Ugandan politician and rebel
