= Mutono =

Mutono is a surname. Notable people with the surname include:

- Jonah Mutono (born 1990), British-Ugandan singer-songwriter
- Patrick Mutono (born 1960), Ugandan physician
