= Patrick Mutono =

Ugandan politician

Patrick Lodoi Mutono
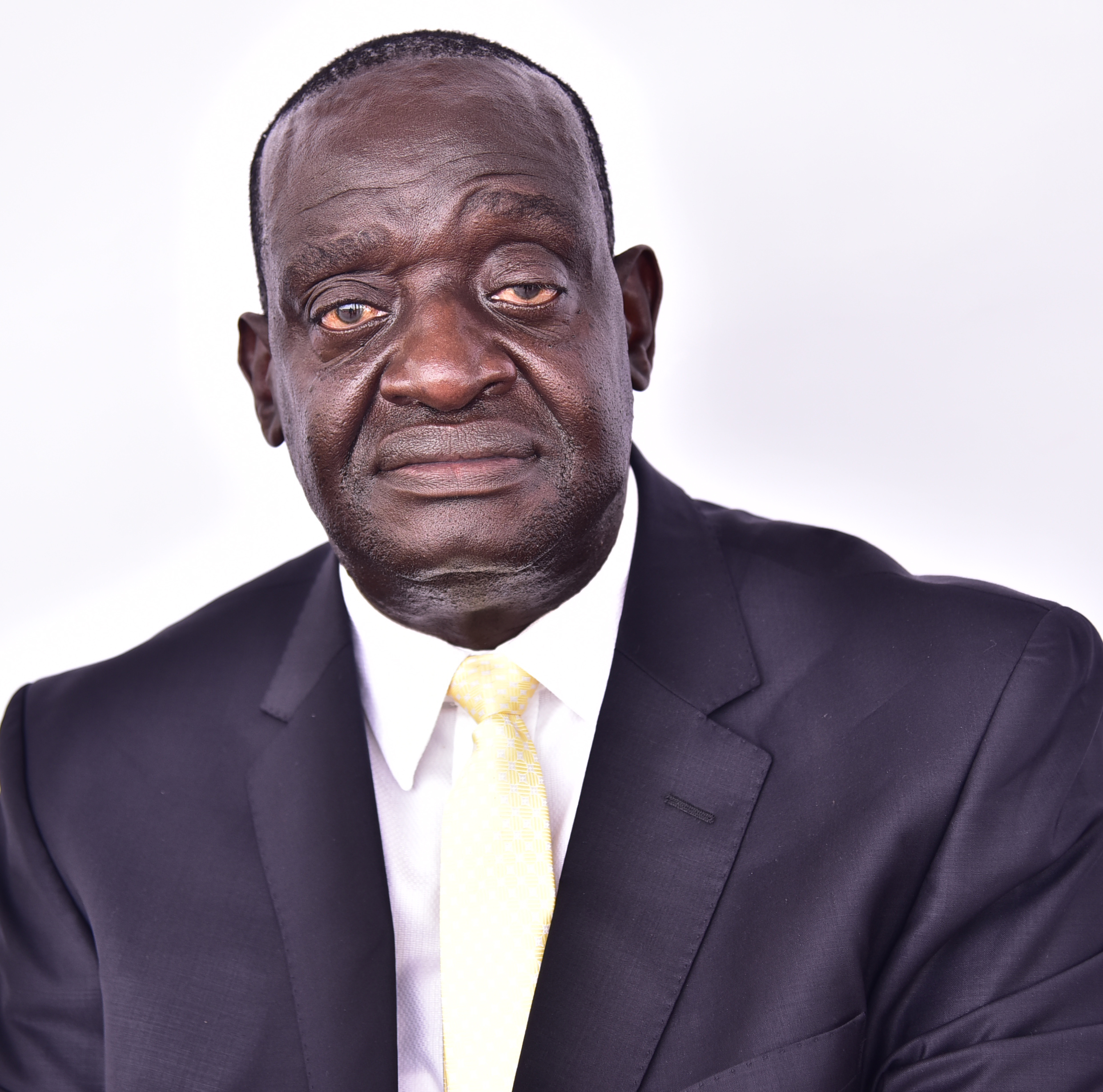

Member of Parliament for Butebo County
- Incumbent
- Assumed office 2013

Personal details
- Born: March 17, 1960 (age 66)
- Occupation: Physician, Politician
- Known for: Member of Parliament for Butebo County; Founder of Lodoi Development Fund

Patrick Lodoi Mutono (born 17 March 1960) is a politician and physician based in Eastern Uganda. He is the founder of Lodoi Development Fund, which to date has built Kanginima Hospital (Pallisa), and orchestrated the construction of 400 clean water well sites in Eastern Uganda. As of 2013, he was a Member of Parliament for Butebo County after winning a by-election. In 2021, he was re elected to serve as member of parliament. He represents the Uganda's political Party Known as National Resistance Movement (NRM) which is also the ruling political party in Uganda.

He lost his Butebo County MP seat to Fred Oduchu Mudukoi of the Natinal Resistance Movement (NRM) who was elected as an independent candidate during the January 2026 parliamentary elections.

== See also ==
- Taban Sharifah Aate
- Jesca Ababiku
- Susan Jolly Abeja
- Parliament of Uganda
