= Obuya =

Obuya is a surname in Kenya and Uganda. Notable people with the surname include:

- Obuya brothers:
  - Collins Obuya (born 1981), Kenyan cricketer
  - David Obuya (born 1979), Kenyan cricketer
  - Kennedy Obuya (born 1972), Kenyan cricketer
- Pius Obuya (born 1998), Ugandan footballer
- Robinson Obuya (born 2000), Ugandan cricketer
