= Agaba =

Agaba may refer to:

== People ==
- Aisa Black Agaba, Ugandan politician
- Tim Agaba (born 1989), Ugandan-born South African rugby union player

== Other uses ==
- Arhopala agaba, species of butterfly
