= Butebo District =

- District
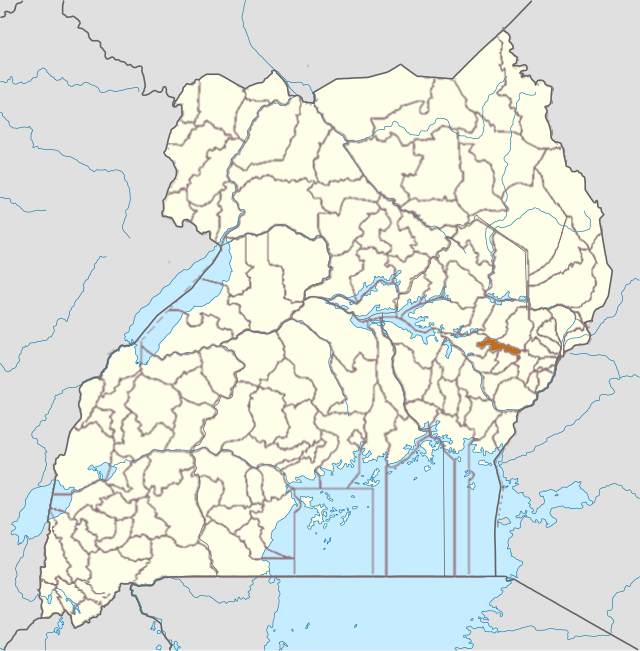
- Coordinates: 01°12′N 33°55′E
- Country: Uganda
- Region: Eastern Uganda
- Capital: Butebo

Area
  - Total: 236 km^{2} (91 sq mi)

Population (2024 census)
  - Total: 171,433
  - Density: 726/km^{2} (1,880/sq mi)
- Time zone: UTC+3 (EAT)
- Website: www.butebo.go.ug

Butebo District is a district in the Eastern Region of Uganda. Like most other Ugandan districts, it is named after its chief town, Butebo, where the district headquarters are located.

== Location ==
Butebo District is bordered to the north by (from west to east) Ngora District, Kumi District and Bukedea District. Mbale District lies to the east, Budaka District lies to the south and Pallisa District lies to the west. The location of the district headquarters at Butebo are located approximately 51 kilometres (32 mi), by road, northwest of the city of Mbale, the largest city in Eastern Uganda.

Butebo District has one subcounty with over 17 sub counties. the sub county is called butebu and it has the sub counties as follow:

- Butebo.These are some of the parishes which include; Kangado, Kasyebai, and Odipanyi.
- Butebo Town Council. Central ward, East ward, South ward, North ward and West ward are the five parishes in Butebo Town council.
- Kabelai. Parishes include; Gayaza, Kabelai, and Kayoga.
- Kabwangasi. This sub county has Bulalaka, Doko, Kaloja, and Nasenyi parishes
- Kabwangasi town council.Jt is made up of Kabwangasi ward, Kasenyi ward and Morutome ward.
- Kachuru.This sub county has three parishes namely: Kachuru, Katubai, and Kinakumi.
- Kadokolene.The three parishes that form Kadokolene sub county are Buchema, Kadokolene, and Kateryo.
- Kakoro. The parishes here include: Kadoto, Kakoro, and Tekwana Parish.
- Kakoro town council. Eastern ward, Kaitisya ward, Kasajja ward, Northern ward and Western ward form Kakoro town council.
- Kanginima.Parishes here include: Kasupete, Kitoika wononi and Nalidi
- Kanginima town council. The parishes for Kanginima town council include; Bupadoi ward, Kanginima ward, Katika ward.
- Kanyum. Akisim, Kaduyon Kanyum and Kokalen parish form Kanyum sub county.
- Kapunyasi. Parishes for Kapunyasi sub county include; Buyeda, Kapunyasi, and Nasuleta parish.
- Maizimasa. Kawojani, Komolo, sukusuku and Maizimasa parish form maizimasa sub county.
- Petete. Kachabali, Manyowe, and Sidanyi Parish.
- Petete town council. The parishes that form this sub county include the following: Kaberekeke ward, Kachocha ward, Kosinge ward, and Petete ward.
- Putti. These are the five parishes which are found in Putti sub county in Butebo county and they include: Buloki, Nabiku, Nabitende, and Putti Parish.

== Overview ==
Following requests for district status by the residents, President Yoweri Museveni, in 2010, instructed his Minister of Local Government at the time, Adolf Mwesige, table a law in the Ugandan parliament to that effect. The law was tabled in parliament in August 2015, with the district to become operational on 1 July 2017. Prior to then the district was "Butebo County" in Pallisa District.

== Population ==
In 2008, the population of Butebo District was estimated at 120,000 people. in 2014 the population was 111,762 and 2023 it was 171,433.

== Notable people ==
- Stephen Mallinga (17 November 1943 to 11 April 2013), medical doctor and politician. Formerly Minister of Disaster Preparedness and Refugees (2011–2013) and former Minister of Health (2006 until 2011). Former MP, representing Butebo County.
- Patrick Mutono (17 March 1960), medical doctor and politician. Current MP, representing Butebo County.

== Economic activity ==
- Millet
- Maize
- Beans
- Cassava

== Livestock ==
- Cattle
- Goat
- Sheep
- chicken

== See also ==
- Districts of Uganda
- Regions of Uganda
- Eastern Region, Uganda
- Parliament of Uganda
