= Pius Obuya =

Ugandan footballer (born 1998)

Personal information
- Date of birth: 17 July 1998 (age 28)
- Place of birth: Pallisa, Uganda
- Height: 1.79 m (5 ft 10 in)
- Position: Attacking midfielder

Senior career*
Years	Team	Apps	(Gls)
2015–2021	Maroons		
2021–2022	Kabel	19	(1)
2022–2025	Radnički Sremska Mitrovica	38	(4)

International career^{‡}
2014	Uganda U17		
2017	Uganda U20		
- * Club domestic league appearances and goals as of 26 December 2023 ‡ National team caps and goals as of 30 May 2023

Pius Obuya (born 17 July 1998) is an Ugandan professional footballer who most recently played as a midfielder for Serbian First League club Radnički Sremska Mitrovica.

== Early life ==
Obuya was born to Lawrence Opolot and Dominika Eiyo. He attended Murchison Bay Primary School in Luzira (P1-P7), Risa College, Nansana (Senior 1), Amus College (S2-S3), and completed both his O level and A level from St Mary’s SS Kitende (S4-S6).

== Club career ==
=== Maroons ===
Obuya made his debut for Maroons FC against Express FC at Mutesa II Stadium on 29 August 2015, however Express FC won 3–2 against Maroons FC.

=== Kabel ===
In October 2021, Obuya joined FK Kabel after a one-month trial in Serbia. He made his debut on 3rd 2021 in a goalless draw against FK Budućnost Dobanovci.

=== Radnički Sremska Mitrovica ===
He made his debut for FK Radnički Sremska Mitrovica but lost 1–0 to FK Radnički Beograd when he came off the bench in the 69th minute to replace Aleksandar Rakić.

== International career ==
=== Uganda U20 ===
Obuya played for Uganda U20 during the COSAFA U-20 Tournament in Zambia in 2017. He made his debut on 6 December 2017, against Zambia U20 at Arthur Davis Stadium, Kitwe. However, he was replaced by Julius Poloto in the second half.

=== Uganda U17 ===
Obuya featured for Uganda U17 during the 2015 African U-17 Championship qualification against Seychelles.
