= Kadama =

- Map of Uganda showing location of Kadama
- Coordinates: 01°01′00″N 33°52′49″E
- Country: Uganda
- Region: Eastern Region
- District: Kibuku District

Government
  - Mayor: Muzamir Masiga
- Elevation: 1,112 m (3,648 ft)

Population (2018 Estimate)
  - Total: 10,000+
- Time zone: UTC+3 (EAT)

Kadama is a town in Kibuku District, in the Eastern Region of Uganda.

== Location ==
The town lies along the 107 kilometres (66 mi) Iganga–Tirinyi–Kamonkoli–Mbale Road, approximately 40 kilometres (25 mi), southwest of Mbale, the largest city in the Eastern Region of Uganda. This is about 68 kilometres (42 mi), by road north-east of Iganga. The coordinates of Kadama are 01°01'00.0"N, 33°52'49.0"E (Latitude:1.016667; Longitude:33.880278). The town lies at an average elevation of 1,112 metres (3,648 ft) above sea level.

== Overview ==
Kadama is a rapidly expending urban center, attracting new people from within and from without Kibuku District. Kadama Health Centre IV, Provides free public health services. Despite the presence of national grid electricity, the absence of piped water, lack of garbage collection services and the presence of noise pollution, on account of an inordinate number of bars and night clubs, pose public health challenges.

== Population ==
In 2018, the population of Kadama Municipality was estimated in excess of 10,000 people.
