= Kirya Balaki Kebba =

Ugandan politician

Kirya Balaki Kebba (1924–1994) was the former-rebel leader now-defunct rebel Uganda Freedom Movement. He was kidnapped by security agents from Jamuhuri estate in Nairobi while in exile in the Republic of Kenya and brought back to Uganda. Kirya Balaki Kebba was acquitted of Treason charges in 1983 but was detained.

== Born ==
One of the architects of Ugandan nationalism, Kirya Balaki Kebba's father belonged to the Baganza clan and his mother of the Balumba Clan, was born in 1924 at Petete, Iki-Iki, in Bukedi (current-day Budaka District) who later died in 1994 and buried at Nyanza Village Kamonkoli, Budaka District.

== Education ==
KIRYA Balaki Kebba was educated at Budaka Junior Secondary School, Nairobi Kabete Jeanes School, a training Institution for African colonial development officers in 1942, Kennedy College Ceylon in 1944, the current Sri Lanka which was a British Crown Colony, intelligence and map reference course and course in Social Welfare 1946.

== Soldier ==
Kirya Balaki Kebba joined the army at 17 years of age and rose through the ranks as a soldier in the Kings African Rifles. As a Non-Commissioned Officer he experienced World War II under the 121st Brigade in Burma.

After the war he served as a welfare officer of the Toro colonial administration between 1947 and 1953. It is in his service as an administrator in the colonial establishment and he came face-to face with the oppression of Africans. he then chose to change that by beginning on the economic side when he together with chief Wakida Philipo founded the North Bukedi Co-operative Union (the first cooperative society in Bukedi) with the goal of promoting the native livelihood. In this role he criticized the colonial establishment, which created for him a social base and turned him into a politician.

== Political Position ==
Kirya Balaki Kebba was the first highly trained military officer and government minister among the Gwere people, who later became one of the first leaders of Uganda's first political party, Uganda National Congress (UNC) in charge of the Mbale branch. However, in the mid-1950s UNC, under Ignatius Musaazi split, Kirya together with other UNC members from outside Buganda broke away to form the UPC, which was agitating for a united Uganda.

Muteesa II of Buganda, Kabaka of Buganda, sent Kirya Balaki Kebba to look for a competent young person who would contest against Benedicto Kiwanuka Democratic Party (DP), Kirya with others identified Milton Obote and after instructing him how to behave before the King they introduced him to the Kabaka of Buganda.

Kirya Balaki Kebba was Minister of State (for security) office of the president, a National Resistance Council Member, elected as a member of parliament in 1962; Appointed Minister without portfolio; Minister of Works in 1963; Minister of Mineral and Water among other.

When, in the mid to late 1960s, Apollo Milton Obote was engaged in a power struggle with the President of Uganda, Kabaka Edward Muteesa II following the collapse of the Uganda People's Congress – Kabaka Yekka (UPC-KY) alliance, five members of his Cabinet and ruling UPC party fell out with him. History indicates that Milton Obote discovered that Kirya was siding with Kabaka Muteesa II of which Kirya ultimately detained indefinitely without trial. Among those five Cabinet Minister's was Kirya, then Minister for Mineral and water Resources.

The other break-aways included Milton Obote, William Nadiope, Adoko Nekyon and Grace Ibingira. Subsequently, Kirya became Bukedi North's representative to the LEGICO when the first batch of Ugandans was elected in 1961.

He was among the Ugandan leaders, who went to London for the constitutional conference, which Uganda inherited at independence. In Kirunda Kivejinja's book Uganda: The Crisis of Confidence, Kirya Balaki Kebba features as one of the politicians, who ran the show on the eve of Independence and in the early Post-Independence years.

In History of Uganda (1962-71), Kirya Balaki Kebba was appointed minister without portfolio but after two years, Milton Obote moved him to head the mineral and water resources ministry. But before independence Kirya Balaki Kebba and Grace Ibingira had been among the architects of the famous UPC/KY Alliance that had handed UPC leadership.

Kirya's contemporaries have often stated that even as a minister, he did not become a blind follower of the leader, who was increasingly becoming fickle and erroneous because he was a veteran at local politics.

As much as Kirya and Milton Obote were age-mates, he reportedly introduced Milton Obote into the political scene and they were very close to Bidandi Ssali, People's Progressive Party chairman; He was a conservative politician, an astute peace and reconciliation broker. After a stalemate, he and Grace Ibingira played a key role in creating a working relationship between UPC and Kabaka Yeka.

Kirya Balaki Kebba dedicated his life to the fight for freedom, a cause for which he was persecuted but he persevered Matia Kasaija, planning State Minister was with Kirya in exile in Nairobi in the Republic of Kenya. Kirya Balaki Kebba was an astute and courageous politician, who disagreed with the Milton Obote II Government to the extent that he had to flee for safety into exile in the Republic of Kenya. Kirya was not given to political ideologism and dogma, criticizing the UPC government when it developed leftist-leanings.

In February 1966 Milton Obote by then as a prime minister, was being pinned by the Uganda Parliament for involvement in an ivory and gold scandal, among those asking Milton Obote to clear his position was Kirya . Milton Obote reacted by imprisoning Kirya Balaki Kebba, Grace Ibingira, Dr.Lumu, M.Ngobi, Cuthbert Joseph Obwangor and G.Magezi all Government Minister's that wanted the Milton Obote to come to book. Many believe had the said six Minister's not been imprisoned, reforms that saw traditional kingdoms abolished and two undemocratic constitutions forced unto Uganda would not have been successful.

Idi Amin released Kirya among the political prisoners whom he set free upon his coup in 1971. But shortly, he had to run for his life, as Idi Amin embarked on killed former Milton Obote Minister's.

Balaki Kebba went into exile in the Republic Kenya, where he became part of the liberation struggles to oust Iddi Amin on condition that Milton Obote was not involved. After the liberation war in 1979, he was appointed director for the Eastern Region under Yusuf Lule's Government. However, the political situation remained unstable, and a couple of years later Balaki kebba was back at his Kenya residence in Jamuhuri estate as a political exile for the second time.

== Exile ==
In 1981, Kirya Balaki Kebba and his cousin Katunku Nicholas being strong supporters of the Democratic Party went to exile in the Republic of Kenya after the 1981 Uganda elections.

In 1982, at his at home in Jamuhuri Estate Nairobi, Opio, among other Milton Obote's operative's, kidnapped Kirya Balaki Kebba and took him to Wilson Airstrip in Nairobi where he was flown to Kisumu in Kenya and then bundled into a car and driven back to Uganda via Busia up to Luzira prison on grounds of involvement in rebel activities. Kirya Balaki Kebba was charged together with Prof. Yoweri Kyesimira with treason for their involvement in Dr. Andrew Kayiira's rebel outfit. He was later released and was among the people who participated in the Nairobi peace agreement at City Hall.

Kirya was appointed as the security state minister, which was a position under the Office of the President. President Yoweri Museveni said, in his eulogy at Kirya's funeral, that the minister had been the most important player in winning for the new Government the approval of Western countries, which were initially hostile.

Kirya was also a champion of traditional institutions and was particularly good friends with Kabaka Mutesa II. He remains one of the favourites of Mengo among the country's first crop of leaders, and two years ago the Kabaka of Buganda said a monument was to be erected at Bulange in commemoration of his dedicated friendship and service to the kingdom.

Kirya's burning bridges with Obote set him on a path of sustained opposition of whatever he deemed as "bad leadership" in Uganda for the rest of his life, punctuated with several sacrifices. One would say that upon his death in 1994, he left behind a legacy of a dedicated nationalist. He had also come to see his Country back on a path to relative stability under the National Resistance Movement Government.
