= Aisa Black Agaba =

Ugandan politician

Agaba Aisa Black
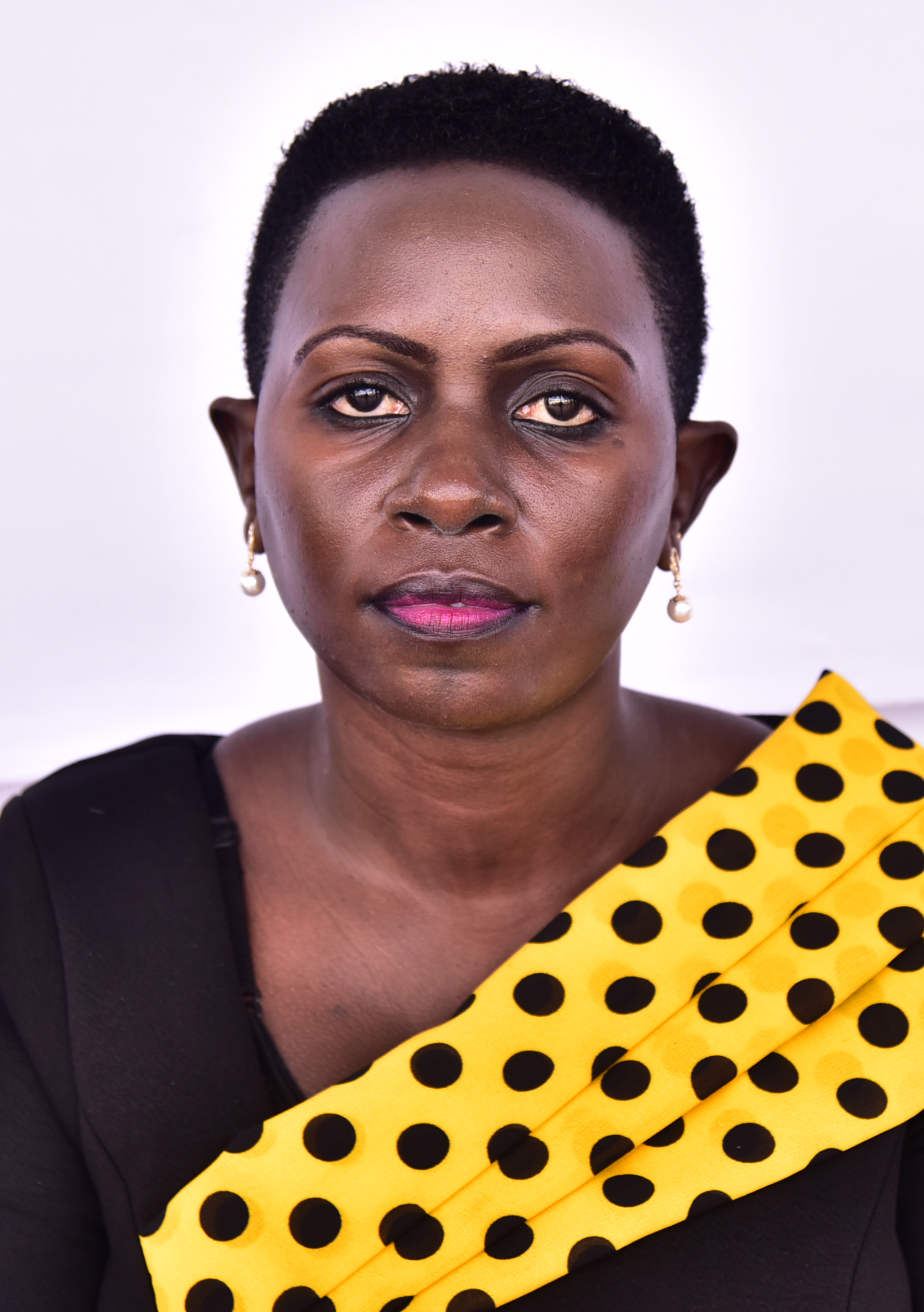

Member of Parliament for Bugangaizi East, Kakumiro District
- Incumbent
- Assumed office 2021
- Preceded by: Twinamatsiko Onesmus

Personal details
- Born: Uganda
- Party: National Resistance Movement
- Occupation: Politician
- Known for: Member of Parliament for Bugangaizi East Constituency
- Committees: Committee on Physical Infrastructure, Committee on National Economy

Agaba Aisa Black is a Ugandan, politician and legislator. She represents the people of Bugangaizi East in Kakumiro District as constituency representative (MP) in the parliament of Uganda.

== Background ==
Agaba is a member of the National Resistance Movement (NRM) a party under the chairmanship of Yoweri Kaguta Museveni president of the republic of Uganda. She defeated the former MP Twinamatsiko Onesmus in the NRM primary elections and in the 2021 Uganda general elections.

== Career ==
In the parliament of Uganda, Agaba serves on two committees that is on physical infrastructure and on national economy.

== See also ==
- Uganda Women Parliamentary Association
- Susan Jolly Abeja
- Bako Christine Abia
- Dorcus Acen
