= Jenipher Namuyangu =

Ugandan politician (born 1968)

Jennifer Namuyangu
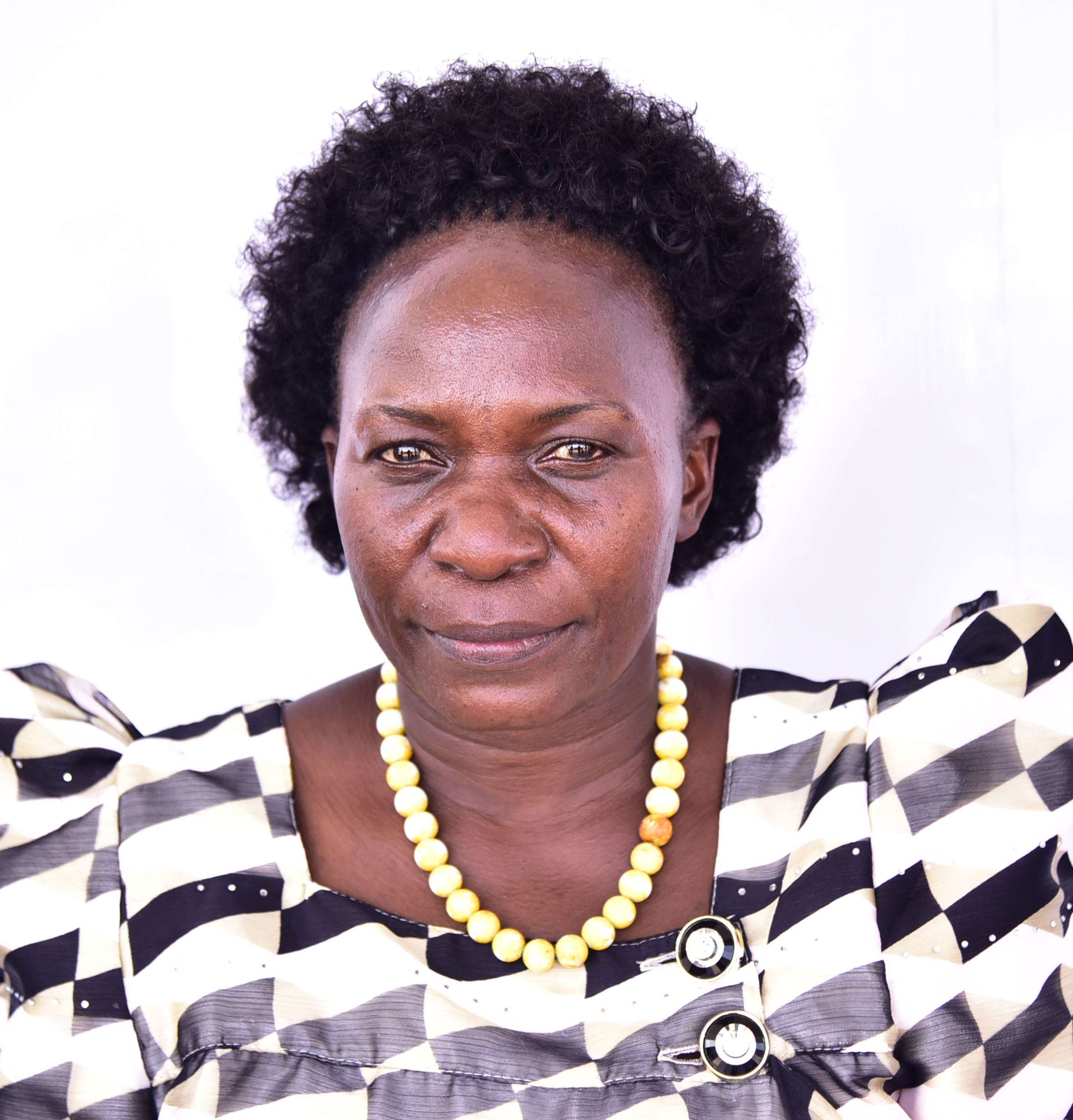
- Born: 27 July 1968 (age 58); Uganda
- Citizenship: Uganda
- Education: Makerere University (Bachelor of Science in Forestry) (Master of Science in Agroforestry)
- Occupations: Politician, forester
- Years active: 1994–present
- Known for: Politics

Jenipher Kacha Namuyangu, also Jennifer Namuyangu Byakatonda, but commonly referred to as Jennifer Namuyangu, is a Ugandan politician and environmentalist. She belongs to the National Resistance Movement political party. She is the current Minister of state for Bunyoro Affairs in the prime minister's office and former Minister of State for Local Government in the Ugandan Cabinet. She was appointed to that position on 6 June 2016. She previously served as the minister of state for Water Resources from 1 June 2006 until 27 May 2011. In the cabinet reshuffle on 27 May 2011, she was dropped from the cabinet and was replaced by Betty Bigombe. She also served as the elected Member of Parliament for Pallisa District Women's Representative from 2001 to 2011. In 2010, Pallisa District was split into two to create Kibuku District. Namuyangu contested for the parliamentary seat of Kibuku County, Kibuku District. She was rigged by Saleh Kamba by a wide margin.

== Background and education ==
Namuyangu was born in Kibuku District on 27 July 1968. Namuyangu attended Kibuku Secondary School for her O-level studies before she transferred to Iganga Secondary School, where she completed her A-level education. She was admitted to Makerere University, Uganda's oldest university, graduating with the degree of Bachelor of Science in Forestry in 1993. Her Master of Science in Agroforestry was also obtained from Makerere University in 1996.

== Career ==
From 1994 until 1996, she served as the Youth Representative for Eastern Uganda to the National Resistance Council, the parliamentary institution at that time. From 1997 until 1998, she served as a lecturer at Nyabyeya Forestry College in Masindi District. She then joined the Ministry of Lands and the Environment, in the Forestry Department, as a seed source development officer, serving in that capacity from 1998 until 2001.

In 2001, she rejoined politics and was elected to represent the women of Pallisa District in parliament. She was again re-elected to the same position in 2006. Between 2003 and 2006, she served as Minister of State for Industry. She was appointed as State Minister for Water Resources on 1 June 2006, serving in that capacity until 27 May 2011. Between 2013 and 2016, she was a member he d Committee of the Ministry of Finance, Planning and Economic Development.

Namuyangu is one of several government ministers and National Resistance Movement MPs who lost in their party primaries and defied President Museveni's directive, to not stand as independent, and instead offered themselves to stand as independent parliamentary candidatesin 2011. She contested against fellow NRM membe Salehh Kamba (the then incumbent MP and NRM flag bearer) for the "Kibuku County" seat, losing by a very wide margin.

== Return to parliament and to cabinet ==
During the 2016 parliamentary elections, Namuyangu contested for the Kibuku district woman member of Parliament representative, on the NRM Party ticket. She won and is the incumbent. On 6 June 2016, she was appointed State Minister for Local Government.

== Personal details ==
Namuyangu is married. She belongs to the ruling National Resistance Movement political party.

== See also ==
- Parliament of Uganda
- Cabinet of Uganda
- Kibuku District
