= William Mukama =

Ugandan politician

William Mukama (1951–2002), was a Ugandan businessman, college headmaster and politician. Mukama served as a founding member and financial backer of the Ninth October Movement, a Ugandan rebel movement that was created in late 1985 to try and recapture state power from the National Resistance Army movement led by Yoweri Museveni and the government of Tito Lutwa Okello.

Mukama was a member of the Uganda Peoples Congress (UPC), the ruling party and government of Uganda before and after the Idi Amin dictatorship.

Mukama was born in 1951 and was a native of the Mbale District, part of which now forms the new Pallisa District, in Eastern Uganda. Brought up as a religious young man, his first and only wish had been to become a priest. His early training in college directed him towards achieving this goal. As a top English and literature graduate, Mukama was drafted as an English teacher in Libya. The young Mukama worked and lived in Libya for approximately seven years where he mastered speaking, writing, and reading Arabic.

In the early 1980s following the fall of Amin, Mukama returned to Uganda and continued teaching. He quickly became the deputy's head and then head of the Namutumba School. Mukama left this position to contest a parliamentary seat for the Iganga District in parliamentary elections as the official candidate of The Uganda Peoples Congress (UPC) under Apollo Milton Obote. Mukama did not win the seat.

Between 1985 and 1989, Mukama, along with Elungat, Captain Namiti, Bright Gabula, and Paulo Muwanga, formed the Ninth October Movement. He was arrested and illegally imprisoned between October 1989 and 1992 by the government of Yoweri Museveni. Mukama was convicted controversially of treason-related charges in 1992 but not treason itself, which would have earned him a death sentence. He died in 2002 under unspecified circumstances.
