= Butebo =

- Location in Uganda
- Coordinates: 01°11′40″N 33°55′20″E
- Country: Uganda
- Admin. region: Eastern Region
- District: Butebo District
- Elevation: 3,648 ft (1,112 m)

Butebo is a town in the Eastern Region of Uganda. It is the chief municipal, administrative and commercial center of Butebo District.

== Location ==
Butebo is located approximately 30 kilometres (19 mi), by road, north-east of Pallisa, the nearest large town. This is approximately 51 kilometres (32 mi), north-west of Mbale, the largest city in Eastern Uganda. Butebo is about 213 kilometres (132 mi), by road, north-east of Kampala, the capital and largest city of Uganda. The geographical coordinates of Butebo are:01°11'40.0"N, 33°55'20.0"E (Latitude:1.194444; Longitude:33.922222). The town of Butebo sits at an average elevation of 1,112 metres (3,648 ft), above sea-level.

== Points of interest ==
- The headquarters of Butebo District Local Government
- The offices of Butebo Town Council
- The headquarters of Butebo sub-county
- Butebo Central Market - The largest source of fresh produce in the town
- Butebo Health Centre IV

== See also ==
- Butebo District
- Eastern Region, Uganda
