= Kibuku =

- Location in Uganda
- Coordinates: 01°02′15″N 33°50′24″E
- Country: Uganda
- Admin. region: Eastern Region
- District: Kibuku District
- Elevation: 3,600 ft (1,100 m)

Population (2013 Estimate)
  - Total: 25,000

Kibuku is a town in Eastern Uganda. It is the chief municipal, administrative and commercial center of Kibuku District.

== Location ==
Kibuku is located approximately 53 kilometres (33 mi), by road, west of Mbale, the largest city in the sub-region. This location is approximately 200 kilometres (120 mi), by road, northeast of Kampala, the capital of Uganda and the largest city in the country. The coordinates of the town are:01 02 15N, 33 50 24E (Latitude:1.0375; Longitude:33.8400). Kibuku does not yet appear on most publicly available maps, as of December 2010.

== Population ==
In 2013, the population of Kibuku Municipality was estimated at 25,000 people. The next national population census in Uganda is planned for August 2014.

== Points of interest ==
- The headquarters of Kibuku District Administration
- The offices of Kibuku Town Council
- Kibuku Central Market - The largest source of fresh produce in the town
- Beacon of Hope Uganda - Kibuku offices a non-government community development organization working in Kibuku district

== Famous people ==
- Jennifer Namuyangu - Former State Minister for Water Resources in the Ugandan Cabinet, from 1 June 2006 until 27 May 2011. Former elected Member of Parliament for Pallisa District Women's Representative, from 2001 until 2011. In 2010, Pallisa District was split into two, to create Kibuku District. Jennifer contested for the seat of "Kibuku County", Kibuku District. She lost to Saleh Kamba.
- Saleh Kamba - Elected Member of Parliament for "Kibuku County", Kibuku District.

== See also ==
- Kibuku District
- Eastern Region, Uganda
