= Branch manager =

A branch manager is an executive who oversees a division or office of a large business or organization, operating locally or with a particular function. Their responsibility is to ensure that payments to employees are correct, their vacation pay arrives on time and they receive proper care if they are injured while working.

In banking, a branch manager is responsible for all functions and staff within the branch office.
