= Budaka, Uganda =

Ugandan town

Budaka
- Location in Uganda
- Coordinates: 01°01′00″N 33°56′42″E
- Country: Uganda
- Region: Eastern Region of Uganda
- District: Budaka District
- Elevation: 3,810 ft (1,160 m)

Population (2024 Census)
  - Total: 33,120

Budaka is a town in the Eastern Region of Uganda. It is the chief town of Budaka District, and the district headquarters are located there.

== Location ==
Budaka is approximately 29 kilometres (18 mi) west of Mbale, the largest city in Uganda's Eastern Region, along the Iganga–Tirinyi–Kamonkoli–Mbale Road. It is approximately 225 kilometres (140 mi) north-east of Kampala, the capital and largest city of Uganda. The coordinates of the town are:01 01 00N, 33 56 42E (Latitude:1.0150; Longitude:33.9450). Budaka Town is situated at an average elevation of 1,160 metres (3,806 ft) above mean sea level.

== Population ==
The 2002 national population census estimated the town's population at 17,000. The Uganda Bureau of Statistics (UBOS) estimated the 2010 population at 21,100. In 2011, UBOS estimated the population at 21,700.

In 2015, UBOS estimated the mid-year population of the town at 24,500. In 2020, according to UBOS, the mid-year population of Budaka was estimated to have increased to 29,100. Of those, 15,100 (51.9 percent) were females and 14,000 (48.1 percent) were males. The population of the town is calculated to have grown at an average annual growth rate of 3.5 percent, between 2015 and 2020, according to UBOS.

== Overview ==
Naboa Sub-County was given that name by British Colonial masters because the area was full of Grammodes geometrica moths (Nziira) of the family Erebidae.

The Basimba people of the Leopard Clan with the names Katunku, Ngulya, Kaabya, Mwati, Kabolesa, Namuyonjo, Ntembe of Lupada, resident in Naboa Sub-County, Budaka County, Budaka District live among the Bagwere but trace their origin from Tanzania and Zambia.

== Points of interest ==
The following points of interest are located within or close to the town of Budaka:

1. The headquarters of Budaka District Administration

2. Bugwere Primary School, with enrollment of about 300 students

3. Budaka central market

4. The offices of Budaka Town Council

5. A mobile branch of PostBank Uganda

6. The Iganga–Tirinyi–Kamonkoli–Mbale Road, passes through town in a general west to east direction.

== See also ==
- List of cities and towns in Uganda
