= Saleh Kamba =

Ugandan politician and government administrator

Lt (rtd) Saleh Kamba

Member of Parliament, Kibuku County
- In office 2006–2016

Resident City Commissioner, Jinja City
- Incumbent
- Assumed office 2022

Resident District Commissioner, Nakasongola District
- Incumbent
- Assumed office 2024

Personal details
- Party: National Resistance Movement

Saleh Kamba is a Ugandan politician and government administrator. He served as the elected Member of Parliament for Kibuku County and later held presidential appointments as a Resident City Commissioner and Resident District Commissioner.

== Background ==
Parliamentary records refer to Kamba as a retired lieutenant.

== Parliamentary career ==
Kamba won the Kibuku County parliamentary seat in the 2006 general election and retained the seat in 2011.

Parliamentary records show Kamba serving on committees during his time in Parliament, including the Committee on Defence and Internal Affairs.

In the 2016 general election, Kamba lost the Kibuku County seat to independent candidate Herbert Kijobe, according to Uganda Radio Network results reporting (Kijobe 14,391 votes, Kamba 12,297 votes).

== Election petitions ==
In August 2011, Uganda Radio Network reported a High Court decision in Mbale nullifying Kamba’s 2011 election on grounds of voter bribery following a petition by Jennifer Namuyangu and others.

== Ministerial nomination ==
President Yoweri Museveni named Kamba as Minister of State for Bunyoro Affairs in the Office of the Prime Minister in the cabinet list published by the Daily Monitor in 2011.

New Vision reported in 2011 that the Parliamentary Appointments Committee did not approve his ministerial nomination, citing issues with academic documentation presented during vetting.

== Government appointments ==
In March 2022, The Independent published a list of presidential appointments naming Kamba for Jinja City in the RDC/RCC reshuffle.

An August 2024 presidential instrument listing RDC postings named “Kamba Saleh Moses Wilson” as Resident District Commissioner for Nakasongola District.

In March 2025, The Independent described Kamba as Kabarole Resident District Commissioner in reporting on Ebola vigilance measures for Fort Portal and surrounding areas.

== Electoral history ==
2006 Ugandan parliamentary election: Kibuku County (Pallisa District)
Party	Candidate	Votes	%	Result
NRM	Saleh Kamba M.W.	21,874	56.83	Elected
DP	Rainer Kafire Juliet	13,502	35.08	Lost
	Dongo David Walter	2,311	6.00	Lost
	Wamubirigwe Julius	630	1.64	Lost
	Takule Jones Wandha	175	0.45	Lost
Total valid votes		38,492	100.00	
Source: Electoral Commission (Uganda).

2011 Ugandan parliamentary election: Kibuku County (Kibuku District)
Party	Candidate	Votes	%	Result
NRM	Kamba Saleh Moses Wilson	23,855	49.93	Elected
Independent	Namuyangu Kacha Jenipher	21,893	45.82	Lost
DP	Rainer Juliet Kafire	1,654	3.46	Lost
Independent	Ndoboli Johnathan Mugeni	148	0.31	Lost
Independent	Wagira Moses	117	0.24	Lost
UPC	Magino Obotie Jonah	111	0.23	Lost
Total valid votes		47,778	100.00	
Source: Electoral Commission (Uganda).

2016 Ugandan parliamentary election: Kibuku County (Kibuku District)
Party	Candidate	Votes	%	Result
Independent	Kinobere Herbert Tom	14,391	52.92	Elected
NRM	Saleh Kamba M.W.	12,297	45.22	Lost
FDC	Kayama B. James	396	1.46	Lost
Independent	Kintu Patrick Benecto	111	0.41	Lost
Total valid votes		27,195	100.00	
Source: Electoral Commission (Uganda).

== See also ==
- Cabinet of Uganda
- Parliament of Uganda
- Kibuku District
- Nakasongola District
