= Tirinyi =

- Location in Uganda
- Coordinates: 01°00′04″N 33°45′45″E
- Country: Uganda
- Region: Eastern Region
- District: Kibuku District
  - Ethnicities density: 1/sq mi (0.39/km^{2})

Tirinyi is a town in the Kibuku District in the Eastern Region of Uganda.

== Location ==
Tirinyi lies along the Iganga–Tirinyi–Kamonkoli–Mbale road, approximately 48 kilometres (30 mi), by road, southwest of Mbale, the nearest large town. It is approximately 60 kilometres (37 mi), by road, northeast of Iganga. The coordinates of the town are 1°00'04.0"N, 33°45'45.0"E (Latitude:1.001123; Longitude:33.762486).

== Overview ==
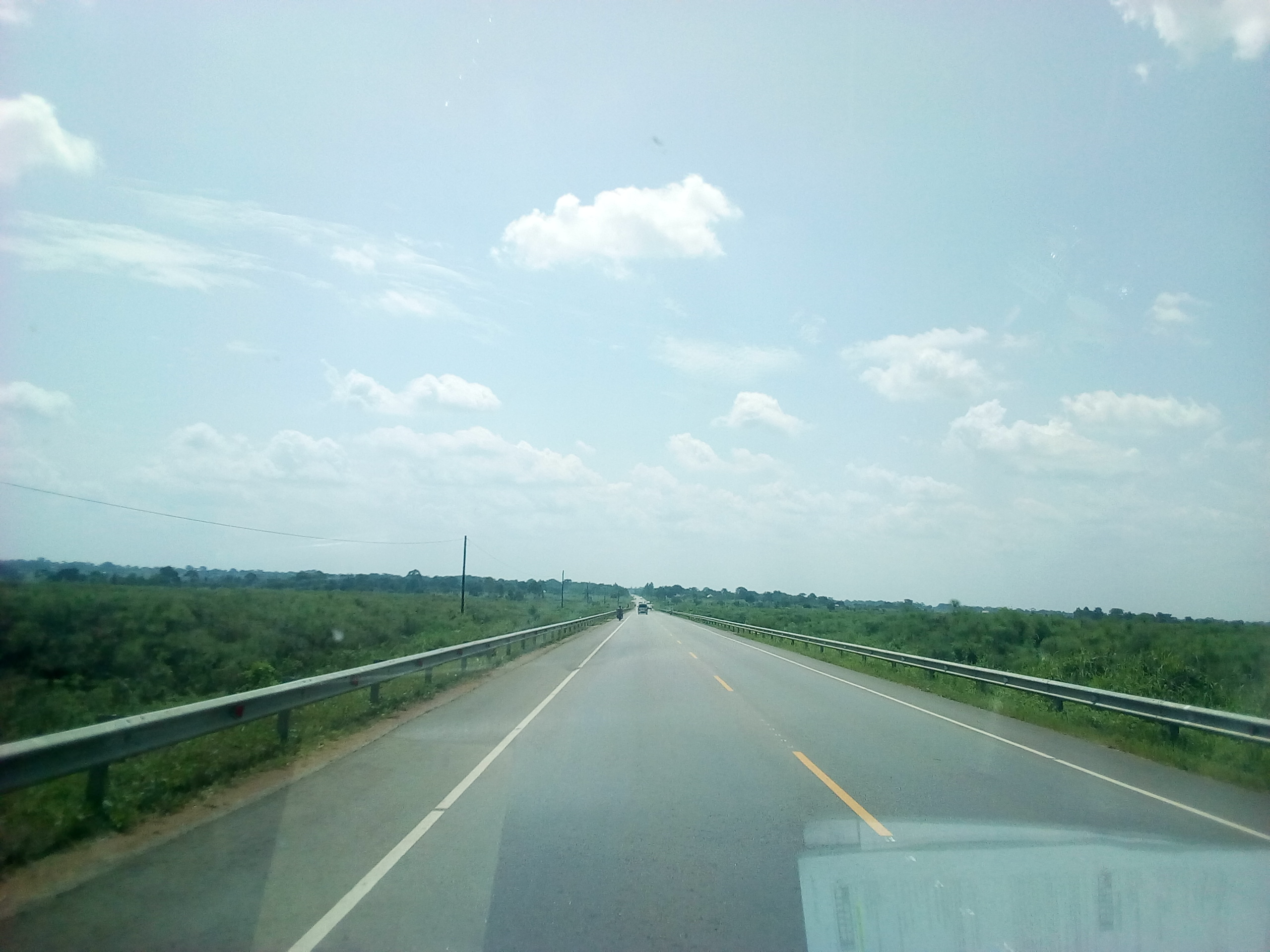
Road to Tirinyi

Tirinyi is the southernmost location on the Tirinyi–Pallisa–Kamonkoli–Kumi Road.

== See also ==
- List of cities and towns in Uganda
