= Susan Jolly Abeja =

Ugandan politician

Susan Abeja Jolly
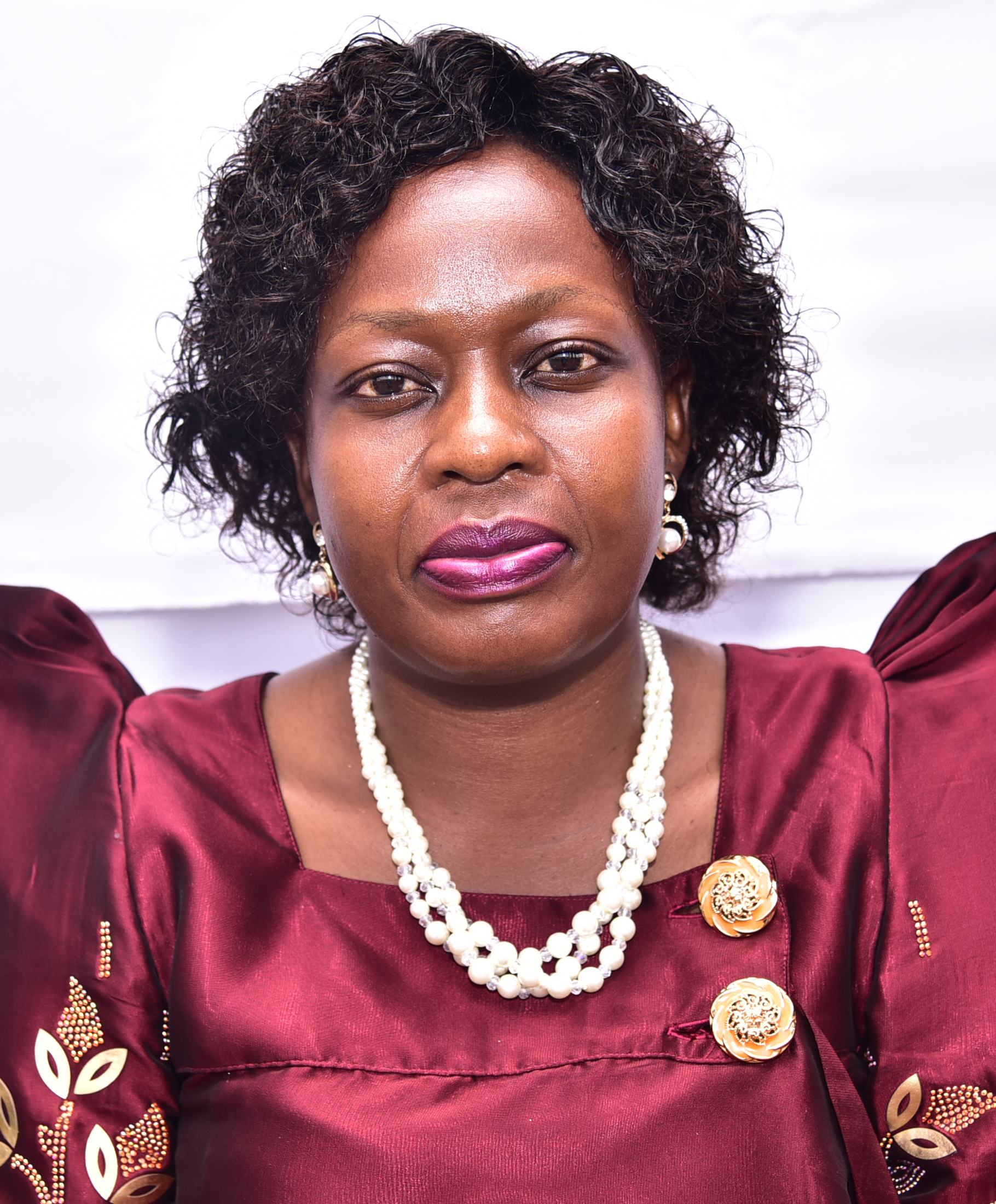

Member of parliament

Personal details
- Citizenship: Ugandan
- Known for: Politics

Susan Jolly Abeja is a Ugandan politician and member of the parliament. She was elected in office as a woman Member to represent Otuke district during the 2021 Uganda general elections.

She is an independent member of parliament. Susan was among the 132 MPs who were sworn in for a five-year term as representatives for different constituencies across the country, in the 11th Parliament on May 17, 2021.

She was re-elected to the 12th parliament in the 2026 general elections and serves on the Parliamentary commission.

== See also ==
- List of members of the eleventh Parliament of Uganda
- Otuke District
- Parliament of Uganda
- Julius Bua Acon
