= Namutumba District =

- District
- District location in Uganda
- Coordinates: 00°21′N 33°03′E
- Country: Uganda
- Region: Eastern Uganda
- Sub-region: Busoga sub-region
- Capital: Namutumba

Area
  - Land: 814.3 km^{2} (314.4 sq mi)

Population (2012 Estimate)
  - Total: 218,900
  - Density: 268.8/km^{2} (696/sq mi)
- Time zone: UTC+3 (EAT)
- Website: www.namutumba.go.ug

Namutumba District, sometimes referred to as Busiki District is a district in Eastern Uganda. It is named after its 'chief town', Namutumba, where the district headquarters are located.

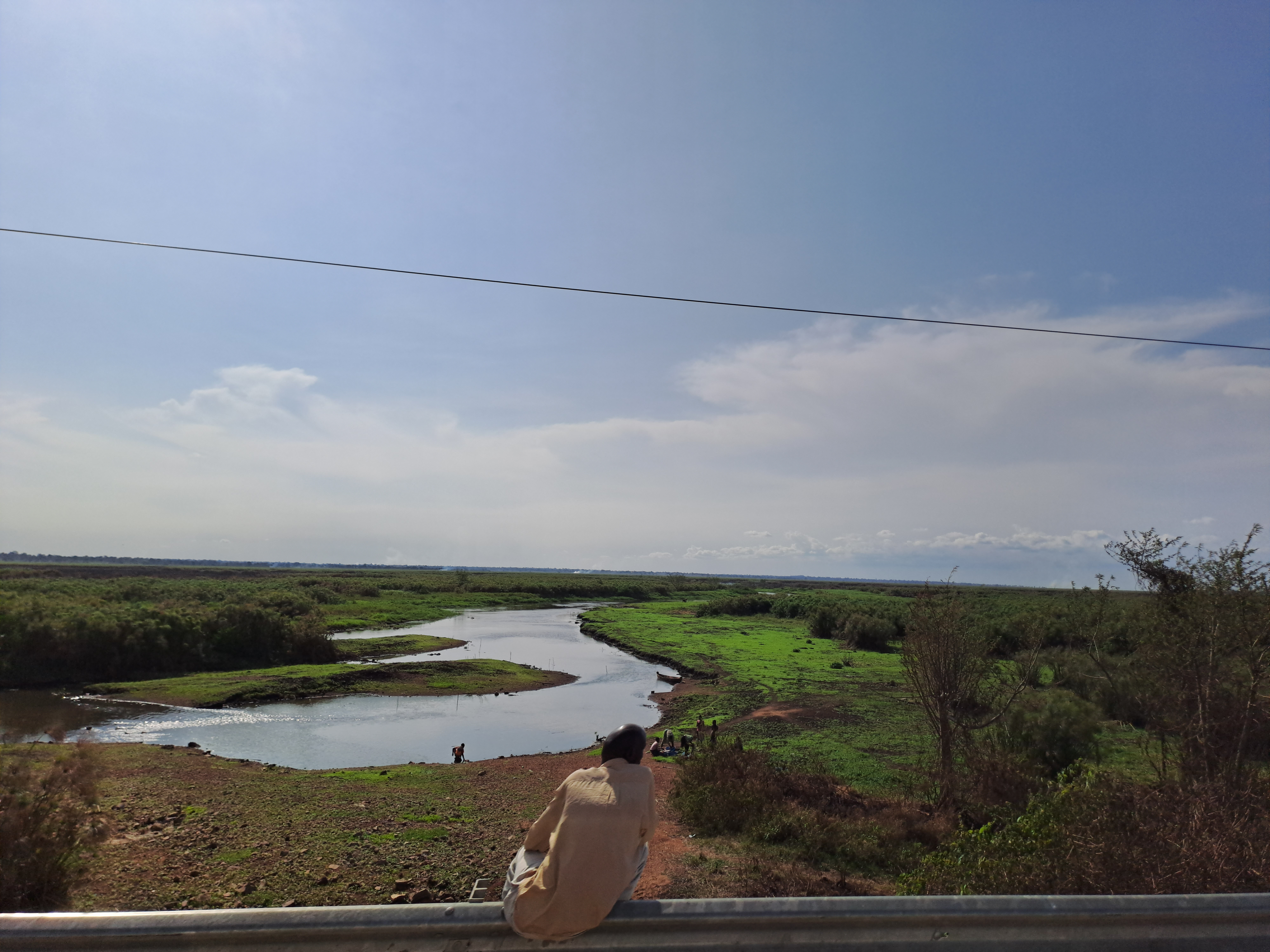
Mpologoma River found in Namutamba district in Uganda.

== Location ==
Namutumba District is bordered by Pallisa District to the north, Kibuku District to the northeast, Butaleja District to the southeast, Bugiri District to the south, Iganga District to the southwest and Kaliro District to the northwest. The district headquarters at Namutumba are located approximately 90 kilometres (56 mi), by road, northeast of Jinja, the largest city in the sub-region. The coordinates of the district are:00 51N, 33 41E.

== Administrative structure ==
The district as the top administrative headquarter of namutumber is also further divided into small administrative units such as sub county, town council, parish and ward. The district has over three county of Bukono county, Bugobi county and lastly Busiki north county. These county are also divided into more smaller administrative units called sub county, town council, parish and ward.

Bukono county is made up of several sub counties including:

- Ivukula
- Ivukula town council
- Kibaale
- Kibaale town council
- Nabweyo
- Nangonde
- Nangonde town council

Bugobi county has over 8 sub counties and town council including:

- Bugobi town council
- Bulange
- Kizuba
- Namutumba
- Namutumba town council
- Nawaikona
- Nsinze
- Nsinze town council

Busiki north county is one of the county in namutumba district with only 4 sub county and these include the following.

- Kagulu
- Kawanyi
- Magada
- Mazuba

== Overview ==
Namutumba District was created by an Act of the Ugandan Parliament in 2005 and became operational on 1 July 2006. The district was previously part of Iganga District and was known as Busiki County. Namutumba District is part of Busoga sub-region. The districts that constitute the sub-region include the following: 1. Bugiri District 2. Buyende District 3. Bugweri District 4. Iganga District 5. Jinja District 6. Kaliro District 7. Kamuli District 8. Luuka District 9. Mayuge District 10. Namayingo District and 11. Namutumba District

According to the 2002 national census, the Busoga sub-region was home to an estimated 2.5 million people. Namutumba District is divided into the following sub-counties and one town council:

- Bulange
- Ivukula
- Kibaale
- Magada
- Namutumba
- Nsinze
- Namutumba TC

== Population ==
In 1991, the national population census estimated the district population at about 123,900. The national census in 2002 estimated the population of the district at about 167,700. The annual population growth rate in the district was calculated at 2.7%. It is estimated that the population of Namutumba District in 2012 was approximately 218,900. Also In the 2014, the national population census estimated the district population at about 252557, and in current census of 2024, the estimated population of the district was about 311339.

== Economic activities ==
Subsistence agriculture and animal husbandry are the two main economic activities in the district.

- Rice
- Groundnuts
- Sorghum
- Millet
- Cassava

== Livestock ==
- Chicken
- Duck
- Cattle
- Goats
- Sheep

== See also ==
- Namutumba
- Busoga sub-region
- Districts of Uganda
- Eastern Region, Uganda
- 2011 Ugandan general election
- 2006 Ugandan general election
