= Busoga sub-region =

Region of Eastern Uganda

- Sub-region of Uganda
- Interactive map of Busoga sub-region
- Country: Uganda
- Region: Eastern Region
- Largest urban centre: Jinja

Area
  - Total: 9,443 km^{2} (3,646 sq mi)

Population (2024 census)
  - Total: 4,372,349
  - Density: 523/km^{2} (1,350/sq mi)
- Time zone: UTC+3 (EAT)

Busoga sub-region is found in Eastern Uganda occupying an area of over 10,000 square kilometers and according to the 2014 national census about 40 percent of the people in the eastern region live in this sub-region.

== Administrative divisions ==
As of 2018, the districts that constitute the Busoga sub-region include the following:

- Bugiri District (formerly part of Iganga District until 1997)
- Bugweri District (formerly part of Iganga District until 2018)
- Buyende District (formerly part of Kamuli District until 2010)
- Iganga District (formerly part of Jinja District until 1980)
- Jinja District
- Kaliro District (formerly part of Kamuli District until 2006)
- Kamuli District (formerly part of Jinja District until 1980)
- Luuka District (formerly part of Iganga District until 2010)
- Mayuge District (formerly part of Iganga District until 2000)
- Namayingo District (formerly part of Bugiri District until 2010)
- Namutumba District (formerly part of Iganga District until 2006)

UBOS reporting for 2024 census results lists district local governments in Busoga as Bugiri, Iganga, Jinja, Kamuli, Mayuge, Kaliro, Namutumba, Buyende, Luuka, Namayingo, and Bugweri. UBOS also reports Jinja City as a separate city local government within Busoga for census reporting (2024).

Districts and city local government in Busoga sub-region (2024)
| District or city local government | Land area (km2) | Population (2024) | Population density (persons per km2) |
|---|---|---|---|
| Bugiri | 1,033 | 481,176 | 466 |
| Iganga | 633 | 426,596 | 674 |
| Jinja (District) | 499 | 291,733 | 584 |
| Kamuli | 1,515 | 539,699 | 356 |
| Mayuge | 1,075 | 562,048 | 523 |
| Kaliro | 779 | 285,963 | 367 |
| Namutumba | 812 | 311,463 | 383 |
| Buyende | 1,379 | 404,044 | 293 |
| Luuka | 650 | 298,693 | 460 |
| Namayingo | 587 | 266,344 | 454 |
| Bugweri | 302 | 212,204 | 704 |
| Jinja City | 179 | 292,386 | 1,630 |

== History ==
The area covered by the above districts constitutes the traditional Busoga Kingdom. Milton Obote abolished the traditional kingdoms in Uganda in 1967. When Yoweri Museveni re-established them in 1993, Busoga re-constituted itself.

A later law, the Traditional Rulers (Restitution of Assets and Properties) Act, commenced on 30 July 1993 and provided for restitution of confiscated assets and properties linked to traditional rulers.

== Ethnicity and language ==
The sub-region is home mainly to the Basoga ethnic group. The people of Busoga are called Basoga (singular: Musoga). The Basoga speak Lusoga, a Bantu language. Lusoga is similar to Luganda, spoken by the people of the neighboring Buganda Region, which is also referred to as Central Uganda.

Lusoga (Soga) is a major language associated with Busoga. Glottolog lists ISO 639-3 code xog for Soga. Busoga cultural leadership and heritage are commonly linked to the Busoga Kingdom, with a recognised cultural centre near Jinja (Bugembe).

== Location and geography ==
Busoga lies between Lake Victoria, Lake Kyoga, the Victoria Nile, and the Mpologoma River, within eastern Uganda.

== Demographics ==
UBOS reported Busoga sub-region population growth from 3,583,196 (2014) to 4,372,349 (2024). UBOS reported an average annual population growth rate of 2.1 percent for Busoga during 2014 to 2024, below the national average of 2.9 percent.

== Economy ==
Agriculture remains a major livelihood base across the sub-region, alongside fisheries near Lake Victoria and Lake Kyoga. Jinja serves as a major urban and industrial centre in eastern Uganda. Hydropower generation sites at Jinja include Nalubaale and Kiira hydropower stations, operated under Uganda Electricity Generation Company Limited (UEGCL). Sugarcane growing and sugar processing form part of regional agro-industry, including Kakira Sugar Works operations in the Jinja area.

== Transport and services ==
Jinja functions as a transport hub for eastern Uganda, linked to Kampala by major road corridors and serving surrounding districts in Busoga.

== See also ==
- Regions of Uganda
- Districts of Uganda
- Eastern Region, Uganda
