= Kamonkoli =

- Map of Uganda showing location of Kamonkoli
- Coordinates: 01°04′30″N 34°05′44″E
- Country: Uganda
- Region: Eastern Region
- District: Budaka District
- Elevation: 1,119 m (3,671 ft)

Population (2025)
  - Total: 30,000 people
- Time zone: UTC+3 (EAT)

Kamonkoli is a town in Budaka District, in the Eastern Region of Uganda.

== Geography ==
The town is located in Iki-iki county, Budaka district in Eastern Uganda. It lies along Iganga-Tirinyi-Mbale road approximately 7 km from Mbale city and 72 km from Iganga town. It's also the end Eastern leg of Tirinyi-Pallisa-Kamonkoli-Kumi highway.

The town has two wards with 8 cells. North Ward:- Bubulanga, Kamonkoli'A', Kamonkoli'B' and Bulalaka.

South Ward:- Namusango, Kamonkoli central, Nyanza'A' and Nyanza'B'.

It lies on a plateau 1119m above sea level with average annual temperature of 28°c and rainfall between 900-1200mm/rf. It is bordering Namatala swamp, one of the largest wetlands in Uganda.

== Population ==
Nyanza'A' cell has the most population in the area with about 4,500 people (estimate 2024) in the town. More than half of the population lives above poverty lines making about 60%, thus in every 100 people, 60 can earn at least 1$ per day while the 40 cannot.

The town is the fastest growing in the district, benefiting from industries like Uganda Clays, Ltd., a branch of Kajansi factory, Uganda's largest manufacturer of clay products. Metro Cement, Ltd. is located in Nyanza'A' and a plastic recycling industries which have employed the youths around.

The town is mostly inhabited by the Bagwere, although some tribes such as Bagisu, Basoga, Iteso, and a few Baganda also live there, and Bagwere clans that live there are the Balaraka, Babulanga, Bakomolo, Bakatikoko, Balyampiti, and Bakaduuka.

== Economy ==
The major cash crops were typically rice and cotton (cotton was abandoned due to price fluctuations). Other crops include cassava, groundnuts, millet, beans, maize, etc. Rice is mostly grown in Nyanza B and other areas near Namatala swamp.

Mining is mostly done for marrum and clay. Livestock such as goats and cows are reared. Small scale fishing is done mostly in the swamps and some fish ponds. Food processing industries operate in the town, mostly for rice.

== Amenities ==
Tourist spots are swamps and factories. It is the location of the biggest hotel, Marple cottages, in the district and the biggest mosque in Bugwere. The Seventh Day Adventists Eastern Uganda Field Headquarters are located there.

== History ==
In the late 2000s, the people of the town especially those living along Namatala had land conflicts with the Bagisu people of Mbale, which cost many lives.

== Health care ==
The town has a grade III government hospital located in Nyanza A. And several other private clinics.

== Education ==
The town has various schools ranging from nursery to university, including Genesis P/s, Kamonkoli college, and Livingstone international university. Other schools are Kamonkoli mixed p/s, Nyanza II p/s, Kamonkoli Nursery and p/s, HIS primary school, and so many other private institutions and schools

== Notables ==
- Baraki Kirya was a famous politician in the times of Obote and Iddi Amini Dada. Was residing from there in Nyanza'A'.
- Famous pastor Irene Manjeri is also a born of Kamonkoli

== Economic activity ==
- Cassava
- Maize
- Beans
- Potatoes

== Livestock ==
- Turkey
- Cattle
- Chicken

== See also ==
- Districts of Uganda
- Eastern Region, Uganda
