= Iganga District =

- District
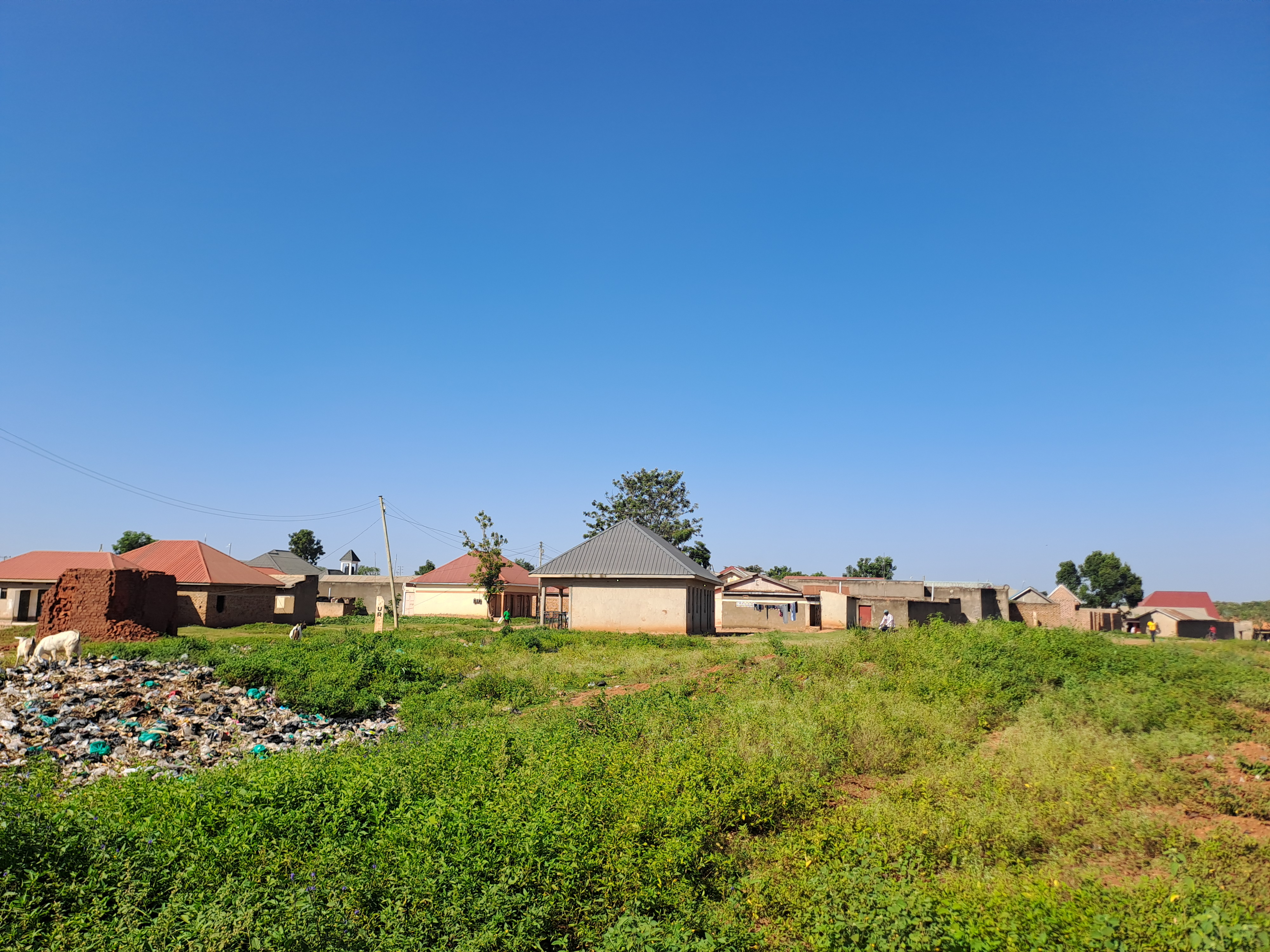

- District location in Uganda
- Coordinates: 00°36′N 33°30′E
- Country: Uganda
- Region: Eastern Uganda
- Sub-region: Busoga sub-region
- Capital: Iganga

Area
  - Land: 1,019 km^{2} (393 sq mi)
- Elevation: 1,138 m (3,734 ft)

Population (2012 Estimate)
  - Total: 499,600
  - Density: 490.3/km^{2} (1,270/sq mi)
- Time zone: UTC+3 (EAT)
- Website: www.iganga.go.ug

Iganga District is a district in the Eastern Region of Uganda. The town of Iganga is the site of the district headquarters.

== Location ==
Iganga District is bordered by Kaliro District to the north, Namutumba District to the northeast, Bugweri District to the east, Mayuge District to the south, Jinja District to the southwest, and Luuka District to the west. The district headquarters at Iganga are located approximately 44 kilometres (27 mi) northeast of Jinja, the largest city in the Busoga sub-region.

== Population ==
In 1991, the national population census estimated the district population at 235,300. The 2002 national census estimated the population of the district at 335,500. The annual population growth rate in the district was estimated at 3.5%. In 2012, the population of Iganga District was estimated at 499,600.

== Religion ==
Iganga District has the 3rd amount of Muslims in Uganda by percentage. Iganga District has the highest proportion of Muslims in Uganda.

== Economic activity ==
- Crop production
- Fishing
- Bookshop
- wholesale and Retail sales
- construction
- Metal repairs and fabrication

== Livestock ==
- Cattle
- Goat
- Chicken

== See also ==
- Busoga
- Eastern Region, Uganda
- Districts of Uganda
