= Pallisa =

- Location in Uganda
- Coordinates: 01°10′03″N 33°42′36″E
- Country: Uganda
- Region: Eastern Region of Uganda
- District: Pallisa District
- Elevation: 3,510 ft (1,070 m)

Population (2024 Census)
  - Total: 41,108

Pallisa is a town in Pallisa District of the Eastern Region of Uganda.

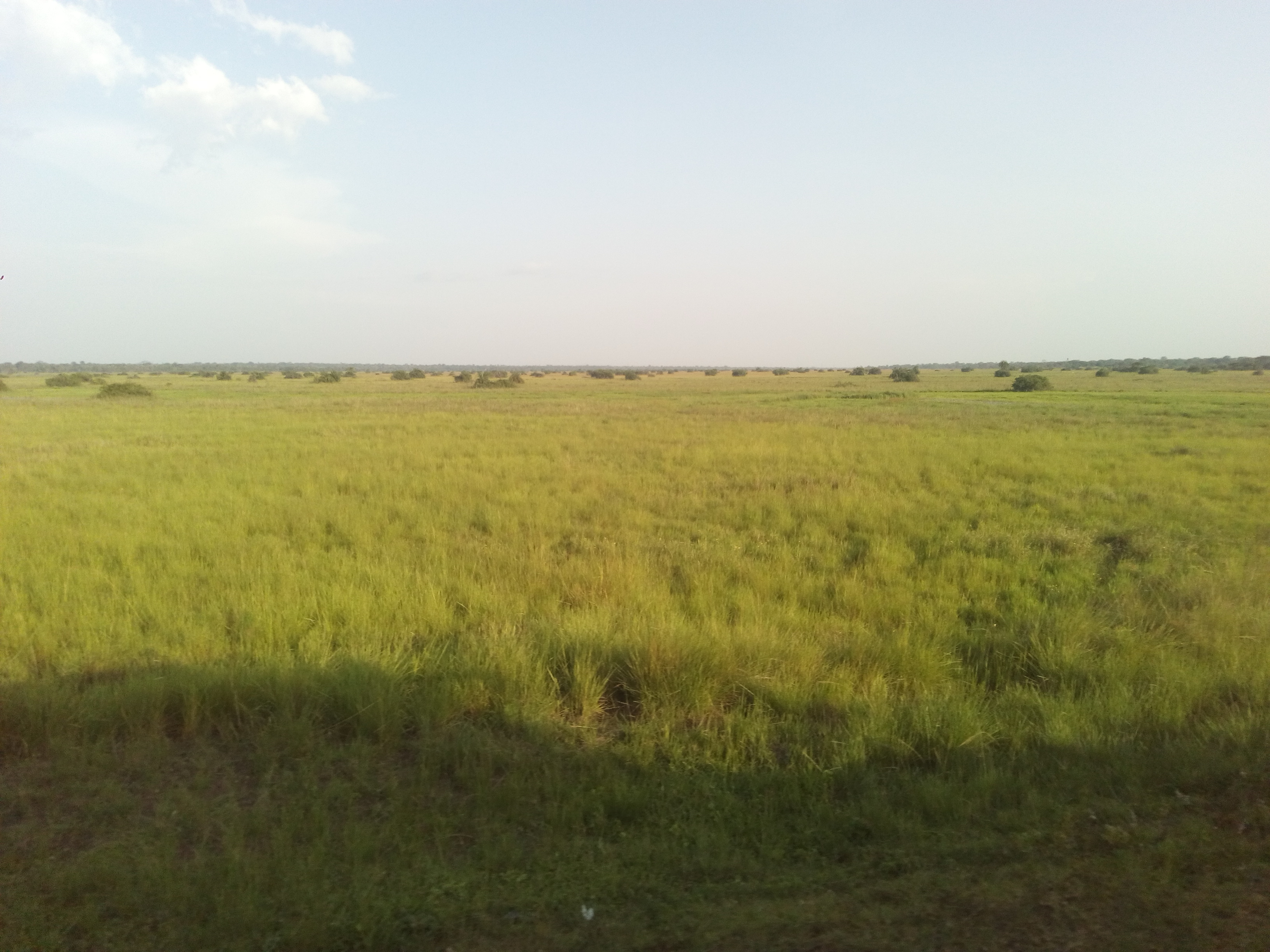
A Papyrus Swamp along Pallisa Kumi Highway

== Geography ==
Pallisa is approximately 56 kilometres (35 mi), by road, west of Mbale, the largest city in the Eastern Region of Uganda. This is approximately 200 kilometres (120 mi), by road, northeast of Kampala, the capital of Uganda. The coordinates of the town are 1°10'03.0"N, 33°42'36.0"E (Latitude:1.1675; Longitude:33.7100).

== Overview ==
The town of Pallisa is in a rural area with limited public transportation. One of the major activities include schooling, with the population of the town swelling to around 40,000 when school is in session. Children come from all around to go to one of the approximately twenty secondary schools in the area, where they live in huts, two to four students per hut, rented to them by villagers. The students fend entirely for themselves while going to school.

== Population ==
In 2014, the national population census and household survey, put the population at 32,681. In 2020, UBOS estimated the mid-year population of the town at 42,300. The population agency calculated the average annual growth rate of Pallisa's population at 4.26 percent per year, between 2014 and 2020.

== Points of interest ==
The following additional points of interest lie within the town limits or near its borders:

1. The headquarters of Pallisa District Administration

2. The offices of Pallisa Town Council

3. Pallisa Central Market

4. A mobile branch of PostBank Uganda

5. The Pallisa Campus of Busitema University, one of the public universities in Uganda

6. The Tirinyi–Pallisa–Kamonkoli–Kumi Road passes through the middle of town.

7. Pallisa General Hospital, a 100-bed capacity public hospital, that serves Pallisa District and neighboring communities.

== See also ==
- List of cities and towns in Uganda
- Juliet Rainer Kafiire, Ugandan politician and legislator who represented Kibuku County in Pallisa between 1994 and 2006
