= Kibuku District =

- District
- District location in Uganda
- Coordinates: 01°02′N 33°50′E
- Country: Uganda
- Region: Eastern Uganda
- Established: 1 July 2010
- Capital: Kibuku

Area
  - Land: 490.2 km^{2} (189.3 sq mi)

Population (2012 Estimate)
  - Total: 181,700
  - Density: 370.7/km^{2} (960/sq mi)
- Time zone: UTC+3 (EAT)
- Website: www.kibuku.go.ug

Kibuku District is a district in Eastern Uganda. It is named after its 'chief town', Kibuku, where the district headquarters are located.

== Location ==
Kibuku District is bordered by Pallisa District to the north, Budaka District to the east, Butaleja District to the south, and Namutumba District to the west. The district headquarters at Kibuku, are located approximately 53 kilometres (33 mi), by road, west of Mbale, the largest city in the sub-region. The coordinates of the district are:01 02N, 33 50E.

Kibuku district is made up of two county namely:

1. Kabweri county. This County has over 12 sub couties which include: Bulangira, Bulangira town council, Goli Goli, Kabweri, Kadama, Kadama town council, Kagumu, Kakutu, Kenkebu, Kirika, Nabiswa, and lastly Nandere
2. Kibuku county: Ten sub counties are found in kibuku county and they are as follow: Buseta, Kasasira, Kasasira Town council, Kibuku, Kibuku town council, Kituti, Lwatama, Nankodo, Tirinyi and Tirinyi town council.

== Overview ==
Kibuku District was created by Act of the Ugandan Parliament, on 1 July 2010. Prior to that the district was part of Pallisa District.

== Population ==
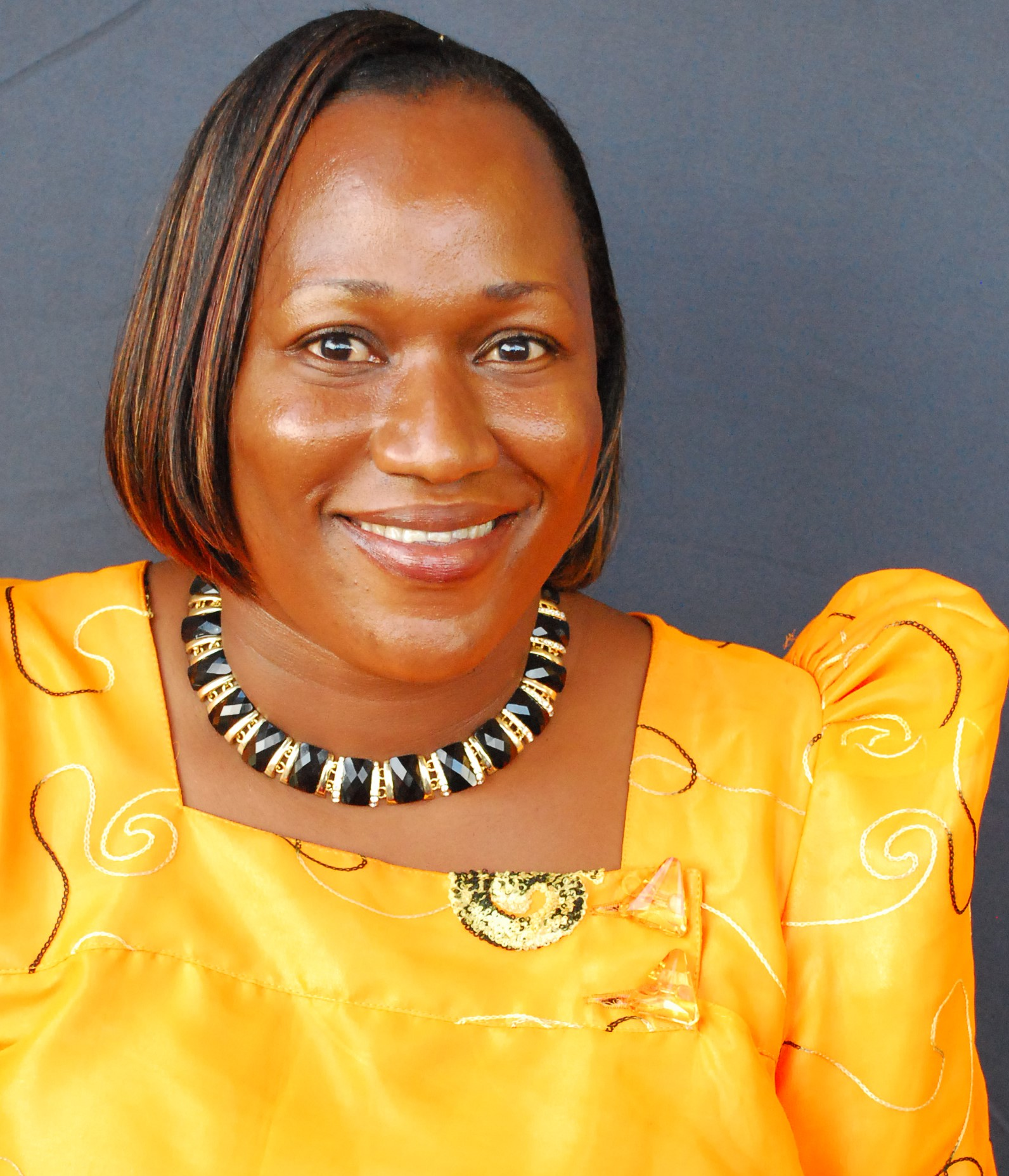
Mwebaza Sarah Wenene, Kibuku Woman MP

The national census in 1991 estimated the district population at about 91,200. The next census in 2002 estimated the population of the district at about 128,200. In 2012, the population of Kibuku District was estimated at approximately 181,700.

== Economic activity ==
Agriculture (subsistence and commercial), is the mainstay of the district economy. crop agriculture involves the following crops:

- Matooke
- Sweet bananas
- Oranges
- Pineapples
- Maize
- Sweet potatoes
- Beans
- Groundnuts
- Cassava

== Religious Persecution ==
On 23 September 2015, 59 year old evangelist Samson Nfunyeku was murdered by Islamists in the village of Kalampete, Kibuku District. Nfunyeku's attackers were opposed to his attempts to convert Muslims to Christianity. One month later, Nfunyeku's sister, Mamwikomba Mwanika, a mother of eight, was also killed.

Then, in August 2021, a Muslim father of a 20-year-old convert to Christianity killed him in Bupalama village for refusing to recant his Christian faith.

== See also ==
- Kibuku
- Eastern Region, Uganda
- Pallisa District
- Districts of Uganda
- Parliament of Uganda
