= Budaka District =

- District
- District location in Uganda
- Coordinates: 01°00′N 33°54′E
- Country: Uganda
- Region: Eastern Uganda
- Established: 1 July 2005
- Capital: Budaka

Area
  - Land: 410.4 km^{2} (158.5 sq mi)
- Elevation: 1,080 m (3,540 ft)

Population (2012 Estimate)
  - Total: 178,900
  - Density: 435.9/km^{2} (1,129/sq mi)
- Time zone: UTC+3 (EAT)
- Website: budaka.go.ug

Budaka District is a district in the Eastern Region of Uganda. The town of Budaka serves as the district headquarters.

== Location ==
Budaka district is bordered by Pallisa District to the north, Mbale District to the east, Butaleja District to the south, and Kibuku District to the west. The town of Budaka is approximately 36 kilometres (22 mi) west of Mbale, the largest city in the sub-region.

Budaka district is also made up of county and sub county. The counties include:

1. Budaka county. In this county there are some sub counties which include; Budaka, Budaka town council, Kachomo, Kachomo town council, Kaderuna, Kakule, Lyama town council, Naboa town council, Nansanga, Tademeri.
2. Iki-Iki county has over nine sub counties and these include: Iki-iki, Iki-iki town council, Kadimukoli, Kakoli, Kameruka, Kamonkoli, Kamonkoli town council, Katira, and Mugiti

== Overview ==
The district consists of Budaka County and Iki-Iki County.

== Population ==
In 1991, the national population census estimated the population of the district at 100,300. The 2002 national census estimated the population at 136,500, with an annual population growth rate of 2.8 percent. In 2012, the population was estimated at 178,900.

== Economic activities ==
In 2009, Uganda Clays Limited opened a tile and brick manufacturing plant at Kamonkoli. The factory employs over 200 people.

- cassava
- Potatoes
- Maize
- Beans
- Millet
- Surghum

== Livestock ==
- Cattle
- Chicken
- Turkey
- Goat

== See also ==
- Districts of Uganda
- Eastern Region, Uganda
- Parliament of Uganda
