= University of Military Science and Technology =

University of Military Science and Technology may refer to:

- Uganda Military Engineering College
- Amir Al-Momenin University of Military Sciences and Technology
