= Aaron Mushengyezi =

Ugandan academic administrator

- Born: 24 July 1969 (age 57); Uganda
- Education: Kyambogo University (Diploma in Education); Makerere University (Bachelor of Arts) (Master of Arts); University of Connecticut (Doctor of Philosophy)
- Occupations: Educator and academic administrator
- Years active: 1989–present
- Known for: Professional expertise
- Title: Vice Chancellor of Uganda Christian University
- Spouse: Patience Rubabinda Mushengyezi

Aaron Mushengyezi (born 24 July 1969) is a Ugandan educator and academic administrator, who serves as the Vice Chancellor of Uganda Christian University (UCU), effective August 2020. Prior to his current position, he served as the Dean of the School of Languages, Literature and Communication at Makerere University, the oldest and largest public university in Uganda.

== Background and education ==
Mushengyezi was born in Uganda on 24 July 1969. He attended local elementary and secondary schools. He holds a Diploma in Education, obtained from the then Institute of Teacher Education, and today is part of Kyambogo University. He went on to obtain a Bachelor of Arts degree from Makerere University. His degree of Master of Arts was also awarded by Makerere. His Doctor of Philosophy degree was awarded by the University of Connecticut, in the United States.

== Career ==
In 1992, Mushengyezi joined Makerere University to pursue a degree in literature and graduated at the top of his class. The university recruited him and retained him as an assistant lecturer, while he pursued his master's degree from 1997 until 2000. Makerere then supported his PhD studies at the University of Connecticut, in the United States. He rose through the ranks and was appointed head of the Department of Mass Communication at Makerere in 2012.

In August 2020, then Associate Professor Aaron Mushengyezi was installed as the Vice Chancellor of Uganda Christian University. He replaced Dr. Cannon John Senyonyi, whose 10-year term had expired.

== Family ==
He is married to Patience Rubabinda Mushengyezi and together are the parents of four children.

== Academic Authorship ==
He has over the years contributed to the creation of new knowledge and his work has been published in some of the best journals and publishing houses. some of his publications include;

- Rethinking indigenous media: rituals, 'talking' drums and orality as forms of public communication in Uganda which is an article published in the journal of African Cultural studies where he argues that communication strategies used to pass information to the rural masses is not the rightful one and as such it has not communicated impact to the masses.
- Oral Literature for Children: rethinking orality, literacy, performance, and documentation practices. This is a book published by Rodopi BV Amsterdam and it contains a collection of oral forms such as riddles, folktales and children's rhymes from Buganda, Ankole and Kigezi.
- Reimaging gender and African tradition? Ousmane Sembène's Xala revisited.This is an articled published in Africa today and it critiques several binary oppositions which Sembene seems to create in Xala between the decadence of modernity and purity of African tradition and between revolutionary masculine women and villainous feminine men.
- From orality to literacy: Translating traditional Ugandan oral forms into texts for children. This is a doctoral dissertation which lists three categories of oral texts collected from the Ugandan child culture.
- Let me tell you a story, let me tell you a story!": On text structure and narrative strategies.This is a book that elaborates about the structures of oral texts that provide the mnemonic elements that help during retelling
- Translating Ugandan oral literature for children: audience, form, and social relevance. This article explores the three forms of oral texts for children - riddles, folktales, and rhymes - and explains the procedures used to transcribe and translate the material into English.
- Problematizing a fundamentalist ideology: A close analysis of Atef Hetata's The Closed Doors and Phil Mullaly's The Martyrs of Uganda. The paper examines the cineastes' portrayal of the dilemmas and dangers posed when extremist religious dogma conflicts with the socio-economic and political realities and contradictions in society.
- Others works include "From tape to the page", Oral texts for children: audience dynamics, form, and social value and Informants for oral narrative and interviews.

== See also ==
- Elly Katunguka
- Barnabas Nawangwe
- Badru Kateregga
