= Owor =

Owor is a Ugandan surname. Notable people with the surname include:

- Paskar Owor (born 1980), Ugandan runner
- Raphael Owor (born 1934), Ugandan physician, pathologist, academic, and medical researcher
- Wilbrod Humphreys Owor (born 1966), Ugandan businessman
