= Okin =

Okin may refer to:

== Surname ==
- Earl Okin (born 1947), English singer and songwriter
- Susan Moller Okin (1946-2004), American philosopher

== Given name ==
- Okin Ojara (born 1971), Ougandan politician

== Place ==
=== Canada ===
- Okin Lake, lake in Manitoba
