= Kazawadi Papias Dedeki =

Rwandan engineer

Federation of Africa Engineering Organisations (FAEO)
- President
- Assumed office 29 January 2023
- Preceded by: Carlien Bou-Chedid

Personal details
- Born: 19 December 1967 (age 58) Tanzania
- Education: College of Science and Technology (Rwanda) (Bsc of Construction Engineering and Management); Kyambogo University (Diploma in Architectural Draughtsmanship)
- Occupation: Leader, Entrepreneur, Engineer and Project Manager
- Committees: Committee on Anti- Corruption (CAC) at WFEO

Kazawadi Papias Dedeki (born 19 December 1967), is a Rwandan engineer and leader.

Papias is serving as president of Federation of Africa Engineering Organisations (FAEO) since January 2023. Addition to this, he also served as chairman of Committee on Anti-Corruption (CAC) at World Federation of Engineering Organizations (WFEO) since November 2019 until October 2023. Between June 2017 and June 2019, Kazawadi served as president and chairman of governing council of Institution of Engineers Rwanda (IER), a professional regulatory body that was established by law no 26/2012 of 29 June 2012 that governs the profession of engineering in Rwanda. Until December 2019, Kazawadi was the managing director of Star Construction and Consultancy Ltd (SCC), an independent contractor, manufacturer of concrete products and consultant company in Rwanda since January 1998, while after he is serving as the chairman of board of the company.

== Early life and education ==
Kazawadi was born on December 19, 1967, in Karagwe, Tanzania on Rwandan parents. He attended secondary school education at Katoke and Nyegezi Seminaries for Ordinal level and Advanced level respectively in Tanzania. Later in 1992 he enrolled for college diploma at former Uganda Polytechnic Kyambogo (UPK) now is Kyambogo University, Uganda he graduated in 1994 with Diploma in Architectural Draughtsmanship.

Kazawadi with his family were among many Rwandans moved back to Rwanda after 1994 Genocide against Tutsi in Rwanda. Between 2006 and 2009, he attended former Kigali Institute of Science, and Technology (KIST) now is University of Rwanda College of Science and Technology, he graduated with Bachelor of Science Degree in Construction Engineering and Management.

== Career ==
=== Local ===
Kazawadi started his career in November 1994 as head of Urbanism Division at former Prefecture de la Ville de Kigali, the present City of Kigali until 1998. In his tenure, he was among technical team and coordinators which did rehabilitation of former Nyamirambo stadium now Kigali Pelé Stadium, and construction of Nyabugogo car park, Kicukiro market and Kimironko market in Kigali city, Rwanda.

In 1996, Kazawadi founded Star Construction and Consultancy Ltd, he served as the managing director for 21 years, from 1998 to 2019. During his tenure, additional to manufacturing of concrete products the company performed various projects in Rwanda categorized in construction of buildings, and irrigation infrastructures in various Rwandan districts such as Rusizi, Nyagatare, Rulindo, Bugesera, Ngoma, Kirehe, Kayonza, Ruhango and Gisagara.

In 2013, the Institution of Engineers Rwanda (IER) was publicly launched by then Rwanda Minister of Infrastructure, Silas Lwakabamba. Kazawadi was elected in first board members which he later became its president and chairman of governing council in June 2017. After being president of the federation he urged all Rwandan engineers to register with the institution (IER) before practicing the profession. He served in this position until June 2019 later on, he is a Continuing Professional Development Committee Member of the Institution of Engineers Rwanda (IER).

=== International ===
After ending his office tenure as president at Institution of Engineers in Rwanda in November 2019, Kazawadi proceeded with serving on international level where he joined World Federation of Engineering Organizations (WFEO) leaders as Chairman of Committee on Anti-Corruption (CAC). Kazawadi was the presenter in UNESCO of the digital registration system for engineers in Rwanda on 31 January 2019. As a representative of WFEO, he was one of the reviewers of report of Sustainable Development Goals implementation with code UN SDGR2019.

In April 2020, Kazawadi, additional to being elected as Chairman of Federation of Africa Engineering Organizations (FAEO) Committee on Anti-Corruption (CAC), also became Chairman of Governance and Ethics Committee at Federation of Africa Engineering Organizations (FAEO). The committee is responsible for advising the FAEO president and the Board on the Strengthening and implementation of FAEO strategies and policies on advocating for professional engineering institutions that matches the development agenda for their respective countries, he served in this position until 2021. In January 2021, Kazawadi was elected as President Elect of, Africa regional organizations affiliated to the World Federation of Engineering Organizations (WFEO), the Federation of Africa Engineering Organizations (FAEO). He became president of FAEO in January 2023 succeeding a Ghanaian woman Eng. Carlien Bou-Chedid, the investiture ceremony held on 28 January 2023 in Kigali Convention Centre, Rwanda. Kazawadi has foreign fellowships with ASEAN Academy of Engineering and Technology (AAET) and The Academy of Engineering and technology for the development world.

== Additional career ==
In May 2015 as a consultant, Kazawadi and his company did elaboration and development of Rwanda Build's Code which contributed to the Rwanda's improvement in 2015 World Bank ease of doing business ranking. Between 2014 and 2017, Kazawadi was the board secretary of Muhima Investment Company (MIC) Ltd in period of planning, constructing and accomplishing of MIC shopping Mall, a $13 million commercial building in Nyarugenge, Kigali. Since 2018, he is a member of Kigali city Technical Advisor Group (TAG) which is responsible for planning and implementing towards the Kigali master plan 2050. He is also a member of manufacturing sector skills council of Rwanda Development Board Kazawadi is also a member of Technical Committee (TC) of Rwanda Standards Board (RSB), a Rwanda national standards body established by the Government of Rwanda. His responsibilities in the committee are development and elaboration of civil engineering standards since 2017. He is a member of task force for establishment of Rwanda accredited mediators institution
