= Oloya =

Oloya is a surname. Notable people with the surname include:

- Moses Oloya (born 1992), Ugandan footballer
- Opiyo Oloya (born 1958), Ugandan-born Canadian educator and author
