= Richard Musani =

Ugandan businessman (born 1985)

- Born: 15 June 1985 (age 41); Kapchorwa, Kapchorwa District
- Citizenship: Uganda
- Education: Makerere University; (Masters in Marketing); Chartered Institute of Marketing; (Chartered Postgraduate Diploma in Marketing)
- Occupations: Chartered Marketer & SME Consultant
- Employer: MPL
- Known for: Marketing Executive, MPL (2012 to date)
- Title: Head of Marketing

Richard Musani (born June 15, 1985) is a Ugandan chartered marketing executive, SME consultant, automotive expert and business columnist. He is the head of marketing for Movit Products Ltd, a personal care company, and former branch manager of Kampala Motors. He joined MPL in 2012 as the brand manager for Movit, a skin care brand, after a three-year and eight-month stint at Kampala Motors. He uses exhibits that have won MPL various trade show awards in the category of Best Exhibitor and was once the Acting President for the students’ guild of Kyambogo University.

Musani was part of the team that developed the African SME Master Plan under the guidance of the African Union Commission. He also contributed to the publication of the first African Journal of Management (AJOM), an initiative of GIZ in cooperation with the East African Community (EAC).

== Background ==
=== Early life and education ===
Richard Musani was born in Kapchorwa, a town in eastern Uganda, on 15 June 1985. A Sabiny by tribe, he was born in a Christian family. He attended Kapchorwa Modern Primary School for his upper primary education where he was instrumental in the formation of debating clubs.

Musani then attended St. Peter's College Tororo for his secondary school education where he served as a voice for students, an assistant house prefect for Bernard Onyango House and also as a furniture prefect. He also served as the chairperson of the Prefects’ Council for Tororo District.

Musani further went to Kyambogo University for his bachelor's degree where he was voted Guild Representative Councilor for the Faculty of Vocational Studies, appointed Guild Minister for Information, Mobilization, Communication and Transport and also named as acting president for the students’ guild. Subsequently, he joined Makerere University for his master's degree and CIM for a postgraduate diploma. Musani holds a Masters in Marketing (2011) from Makerere University and a Chartered Postgraduate Diploma in Marketing (2013) from CIM.

=== Career ===
Musani started his career as a marketing executive at Riley Media prior to his appointment as the branch manager of Kampala Motors in August 2010, where he handled a dealership for Subaru and Mahindra brands of automobiles, at the time generating US $4 million in annual sales turnover. In October 2012, he was appointed brand manager for Movit at MPL. In March 2013, he was promoted to the position of Marketing Manager and in January 2016 was further promoted to the head of marketing role.

Musani has overseen the management and development of the new products Radiant, a hair care brand and Skin Guard, a skin care brand among other personal care brands at MPL. He has steered the growth of the personal care company in export markets. His cross-functional team has at least 120 staff who provide collateral support for all markets in the COMESA regional trade bloc. In October 2015, Musani was part of the team that developed the African SME Master Plan under the guidance of the African Union Commission. In the first quarter of 2016, Musani contributed to the publication of the first African Journal of Management (AJOM), an initiative of GIZ in cooperation with the East African Community (EAC). Musani is also the principal consultant for Rimusan Limited.

== Op-eds & interviews ==
=== Op-eds ===
- "Private universities may out-compete public ones". New Vision. April 14, 2008.
- "Reduce interest rates to boost local investments". New Vision. July 9, 2009.
- "Public universities need marketing skills". New Vision. September 1, 2009.
- "Use the private sector to drive EAC integration". New Vision. October 20, 2009.
- "East Africa: Why Region Needs a Harmonised Property Rights Law". New Vision. September 8, 2010.
- "Let us empower the Sabiny girls to fight FGM". New Vision. December 28, 2010.

=== Interviews ===
- "NBS Breakfast Meeting - Movit Products Ltd, The Best Costmetics Manufacturer". YouTube. November 9, 2015.
