= John Senyonyi =

Ugandan prelate and academic administrator

- Born: 1956 (age 69–70); Nakasongola District, Uganda
- Citizenship: Uganda
- Education: University of Nairobi (BSc in Mathematics); International College of Management, Sydney (Certificate in Management); Trinity International University (MA in Theology); University of Melbourne (PhD in Mathematics)
- Occupations: Academic, Evangelist & Academic Administrator
- Years active: 1978 — present
- Known for: Evangelism and Academic Administration

John Musisi Senyonyi is a Ugandan mathematician, academic, evangelist and academic administrator. He is the immediate past Vice Chancellor of Uganda Christian University, a private university that was accredited by the Uganda National Council of Higher Education (UNCHE), in 1997. He was appointed to that position in 2010. Following ten continuous years in that position, he retired, and handed over to Aaron Mushengyezi, in August 2020.

== Background and education ==
He was born in Nakasongola District, in 1956, to Eriakimu Kajja, a schoolteacher and Mrs. Kajja, a full-time housewife. He is one of thirteen siblings. One of his brothers the late Peter Nyombi, Uganda's former Attorney General and former Member of Parliament for "Buruuli County" in Nakasongola District.

From 1961 until 1968, Senyonyi attended Nakasongola Primary School and later Bbowa Church of Uganda Primary School. From 1969 until 1972, he attended Ndejje Senior Secondary School for his O-Level education. He then transferred to Kings College Budo, for his A-Level education, from 1973 until 1974. In 1975, he was admitted to the University of Nairobi, where he studied Mathematics, graduating with the degree of Bachelor of Science in Mathematics in 1978. Later, he obtained the Certificate in Management, from the International College of Management, Sydney, in Australia. He also holds the degree of Master of Arts in Theology, from Trinity International University, in the United States, obtained in 1992. His degree of Doctorate in Mathematical Statistics, was obtained from the University of Melbourne, in Australia, in 1984.

== At Makerere ==
In 1978, Senyonyi returned to Uganda and began lecturing at Makerere University, the largest and oldest of Uganda's public institutions of higher education. He left to study in Australia, between 1979 and 1984, returning to continue teaching at Makerere.

== As an evangelist ==
He left Makerere in 1988 and for 13 years, until 2000, he travelled the world preaching the gospel with an organisation called African Evangelistic Enterprise. He travelled mainly within Africa and in the United States, but also in Europe.

== At Uganda Christian University ==
In 2001, he joined Uganda Christian University as the University Chaplain. Two and half years later, in 2003, he transitioned to Deputy Vice Chancellor for Finance and Administration. Three years after that, in 2006, he was appointed to the newly created position of Deputy Vice Chancellor for Development and External Relations. He served in that capacity until September 2010 when he was appointed Vice Chancellor of Uganda Christian University; the second Vice Chancellor in the history of the institution.

== Retirement ==
In 2020 he retired from the University service as the second Vice Chancellor since the University's inception. He remains in the service of God and the church as an active Evangelist. He is married to the Canon Dr. Ruth Senyonyi who has also served the church for many years as the provincial Mothers Union President for the Church of Uganda.

== See also ==
- Uganda Universities
- UG Business Schools
- Ugandan Academics

== Other considerations ==
Senyonyi is a married father with one daughter and three sons. He is an ordained Reverend in the Church of Uganda.
