= Henry Bagiire =

Ugandan politician & educator (born 1968)

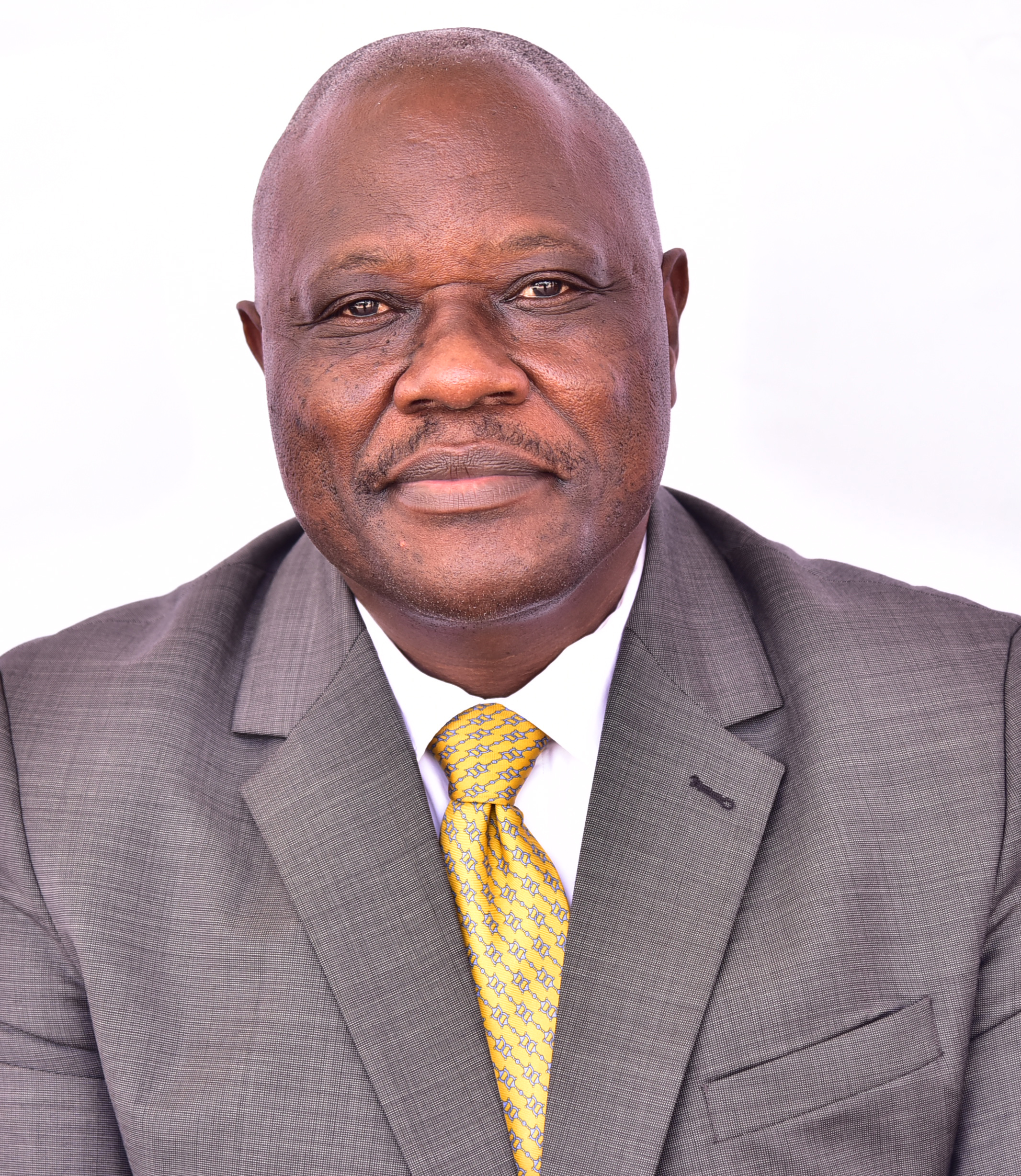
- Born: 27 January 1968 (age 58); Uganda
- Education: Makerere University (Bachelor of Science in Agriculture) (Certificate in Public Administration & Management); Kyambogo University (Diploma in Education)
- Occupations: Educator, politician
- Years active: 1992–present

Henry Aggrey Bagiire (born 27 January 1968), sometimes Aggrey Henry Bagiire, is a Ugandan politician and educator. He served as the State Minister for Agriculture in the Cabinet of Uganda from 16 February 2009 until 27 May 2011. He also served as the elected Member of Parliament (MP) for Bunya County West, Mayuge District, from 2006 to 2009. He is the State Minister for Transport in the Ugandan Cabinet. He was appointed to that position on 6 June 2016. Also served as the elected member of parliament representing Bunya County West, Mayuge District, in the 10th Ugandan Parliament (2016–2021).

== Early life and education ==
Henry Bagiire was born in present-day Mayuge District on 27 January 1968. He holds the Diploma in Education from the Institute of Teacher Education, a component of Kyambogo University, obtained in 1992. His degree of Bachelor of Science in Agriculture was obtained in 1999 from Makerere University. He also holds the Certificate in Public Administration & Management, obtained in 2003, also from Makerere University.

== Career ==
Bagiire taught agriculture at Bukoyo Secondary School from 1992 until 2000, where he rose to the position of head of the Department of Agriculture. Between 2000 and 2001, he worked as the Leader of a Research Team for the International Food Policy Research Institute. Between 1999 and 2002, he served as the Agricultural Extension Officer for Iganga District. From 2002 until 2006, he served as the chairperson of the Mayuge District Service Commission. In 2006, he entered politics and contested for the parliamentary seat of Bunya Country West, Mayuge District, on the National Resistance Movement party ticket. He was elected. On 16 February 2009, he was appointed Minister of State for Agriculture. During the 2011 national election cycle he lost to Vincent Bagiire, first during the NRM primaries and again in the general election, in which Henry Bagiire ran as an independent candidate.

In the cabinet reshuffle of 27 May 2011, he was dropped from the cabinet and was replaced by Zerubabel Nyiira.

== Personal life ==
Henry Bagiire is married. He belongs to the National Resistance Movement political party. His interests include teaching and forest conservation.

== See also ==
- Parliament of Uganda
- Cabinet of Uganda
- Mayuge District
