= Vinand Nantulya =

Ugandan physician, researcher, academic and academic administrator

- Born: 15 January 1946 (age 80); Bulayila Village, Kibuku District, Uganda
- Citizenship: Uganda
- Education: University of Dar es Salaam (Doctor of Medicine); University of Nairobi (Doctor of Philosophy); Royal College of Pathologists (Fellow of the Royal College of Pathologists)
- Occupations: Physician, Pathologist & Academic
- Years active: 1972 — present
- Known for: Academics
- Title: Chancellor of Busitema University
- Spouse: Dr. Florence Nantulya

Vinand Mukatabala Nantulya, is a Ugandan physician, pathologist, medical researcher, entrepreneur and academic administrator, who since 3 October 2017, serves as the Chancellor of Busitema University, a public university in the Eastern Region of Uganda.

== Early life and education ==
Nantulya was born on 15 January 1949 at Bulayila Village, in present-day Kibuku District, the son of Brenda Kirangi and Paulo Mukatabala.

He started his schooling at Bulangira Roman Catholic School from Primary 1 to 4. He then transferred to Kachomo Primary School for Primary 5 and 6. He studied at St. Peter's College Tororo, for his Ordinary-Level and then transferred to Ntare School in Mbarara, where he completed his Advanced-Level studies. He graduated from Ntare with a High School Diploma. He was admitted to the University of Dar es Salaam, in Tanzania, to pursue a degree in human medicine.

Nantulya graduated with the degree of Doctor of Medicine from the University of Dar es Salaam. After internship at Mulago National Referral Hospital, back in his native Uganda, Nantulya won a scholarship to study outside the country and specialize in Immunology. He enrolled for a Doctor of Philosophy at the University of Nairobi. As part of his training, he carried out research in the immunology of infectious diseases in Switzerland. Later, he was conferred with the title of Fellow of the Royal College of Pathologists.

== Career ==
After his internship at Mulago Hospital, Nantulya was employed as a teaching assistant at Makerere University School of Medicine. After his PhD studies at the University of Nairobi, he was hired as a research fellow at the International Laboratory for Research on Animal Diseases (ILRAD), in Nairobi. While there, he began lecturing at Harvard University. He became the senior research scientist in international health at the Harvard School of Public Health. He also served as a professor of health and international relations at the University of Geneva and senior fellow at the University of the Sciences in Philadelphia. In 2002 he was appointed as senior health adviser at The Global Fund to Fight AIDS, Tuberculosis and Malaria, in Geneva.

From 2010 until 2016, Nantulya served as Chairman of the Uganda AIDS Commission. He resigned that position in December 2016. On 3 October 2017, Professor Vinand Mukatabala Nantulya was installed as the second Chancellor of Busitema University, replacing the founding chancellor, Professor Francis Omaswa, whose ten-year service had expired.

Nantulya served on the selection committee that chose Peter Sands to succeed Mark Dybul as executive director of the Global Fund to Fight AIDS, Tuberculosis and Malaria (GFATM) in 2017.

Nantulya developed a vaccine called Kuku Star, that prevents New Castle Disease in chicken. He manufactures the vaccine in his company, Brentec Vaccine Limited, named after his mother, Brenda Kirangi. His other company, Astel Diagnostics Limited, manufactures rapid diagnostic tests against a number of diseases. He serves as a senior advisor on Vaccines and Pharmaceuticals to the President of Uganda.

In June 2020, the Daily Monitor reported that one of Nantulya's laboratories had designed a test for the COVID-19 virus in humans that returns results in five minutes as opposed to 45 minutes or three hours by other methods. The new testing method is undergoing the requisite regulatory approval before being subjected to mass testing in the field.

== Personal life ==
Nantulya is married to Dr. Florence Nakimwero Nantulya, a pediatrician, who practices at Nakasero Hospital, in Kampala, Uganda's capital city. Together, they are parents to five adult children.

== See also ==
- Makerere University
- List of university leaders in Uganda
- Makerere University College of Health Sciences
