= Charles Bakkabulindi =

Ugandan politician

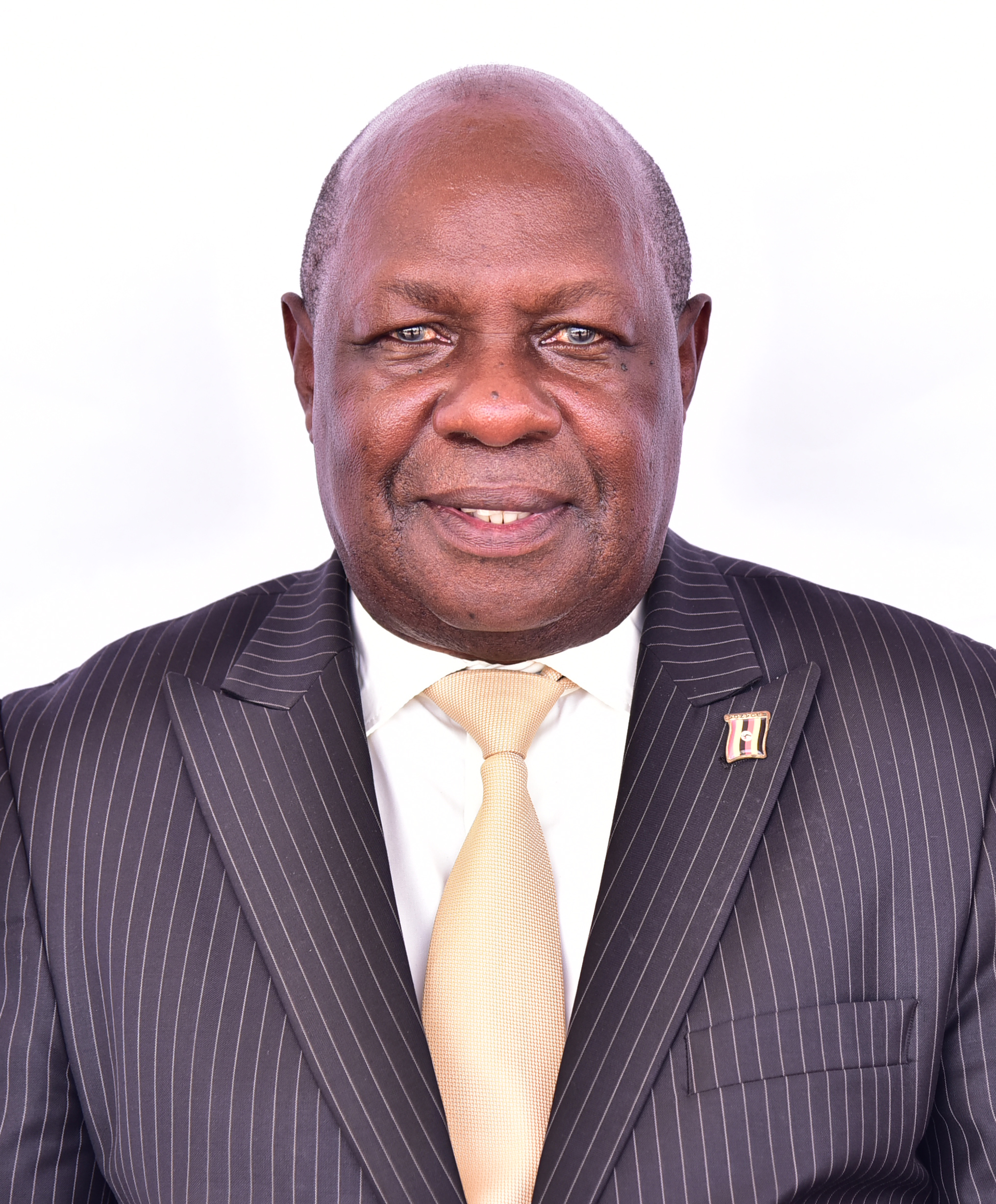
- Born: 25 November 1959 (age 66); Protectorate of Uganda
- Citizenship: Uganda
- Education: Kyambogo University (Diploma in Electrical Engineering); Makerere University (BA in Adult and Community Education); Uganda Management Institute (Diploma in Public Administration) (MA in Management Studies)
- Occupations: Engineer & Politician
- Years active: 1994 — present
- Known for: Politics, Engineering

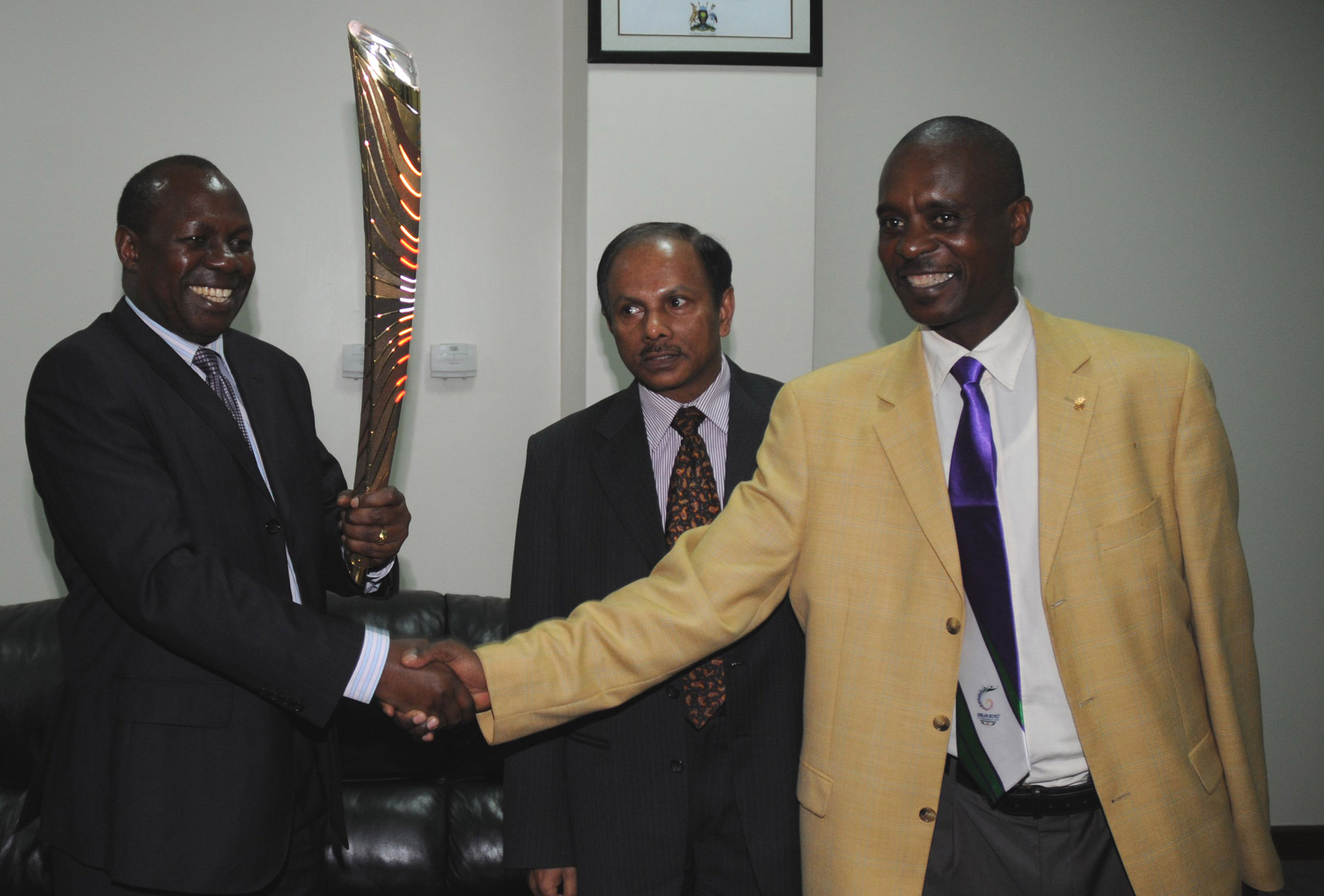
Charles Bakkabulindi with colleagues

Charles Bakkabulindi (born 25 November 1959) is a Ugandan politician. Of recent he served as the State Minister for Sports in the Ugandan Cabinet, Hamsom Obua succeeded him. He was appointed to that position in 2005. In the cabinet reshuffles of 1 June 2006, 16 February 2009, that of 27 May 2011, and that of 1 March 2015 he retained his cabinet post. He is also the Member of Parliament representing Workers.

== Early life and education ==
His oldest post-secondary academic qualification is the Diploma in Electrical Engineering, which he obtained in 1985, from the Uganda Polytechnic Kyambogo, one of the constituent institutions of Kyambogo University. He went on to obtain the degree of Bachelor of Arts in Adult and Community Education, obtained in 2006, from Makerere University, Uganda's oldest and largest public university. In 2007, he was awarded the Postgraduate Diploma in Public Administration, from Uganda Management Institute. His degree of Master of Arts in Management Studies was awarded in 2006, also by UMI.

== Career ==
Between 1994 and 1996, he served as a Delegate to the Constituent Assembly that drafted and passed the 1995 Ugandan Constitution. In 1996, he was elected to serve in Uganda's Parliament as the Workers Representative, a position he has served in since. Also in 1996, he was elected the National Chairman of the Uganda Beverage, Tobacco and Allied Worker's Union, a position he still holds today. In 2005, he was appointed State Minister for Sports. He is the incumbent for that cabinet position, as at March 2015.

Bakkabulindi is married. He is reported to enjoy listening to music, reading, following politics and watching sports.

== See also ==
- Cabinet of Uganda
- Parliament of Uganda
- Government of Uganda
