= St. Peter's College Tororo =

Coordinates: 00°42′18″N 34°12′00″E

St. Peters College Tororo
- Tororo, Tororo District; Uganda

Information
- Type: Public Middle School and High School
- Motto: "Palma Sub Pondere Crescit"
- Established: 1942
- Headmaster: Emuron Luke
- Athletics: Soccer, cricket, track, volleyball, lawn tennis, table tennis, hockey
- Website: www.stpeterscollegetororo.ac.ug

St. Peters College Tororo (SPCT), also known as Tororo College, is an all-boys boarding school covering grades 8 -13 in Eastern Uganda.

== Location ==
The school is located in the Eastern Ugandan town of Tororo, approximately 230 kilometres (140 mi), by road, east of Kampala, the capital of Uganda and the largest city in that country. This location lies approximately 3 kilometres (1.9 mi), by road, outside of the central business district of Tororo, along Kwapa Road. The coordinates of the school campus are: 0° 42' 18.00"N, 34° 12' 0.00"E (Latitude:0.7050; Longitude:34.2000).

== Notable alumni ==
Notable people who have attended Tororo College include:

- Charles Olweny - Physician. oncologist, medical researcher and academic. Current Professor of Medicine and Former Vice Chancellor of Uganda Martyrs University (2006 - 2015).
- Okello Oculi - Author, poet and novelist.
- Opiyo Oloya - Educator, author, newspaper columnist and community leader. Current Superintendent of Schools, York Catholic District School Board, Ontario, Canada.
- Raphael Owor - Physician, pathologist, academic, researcher, and academic administrator, former Chancellor of Mbarara University, past Dean of Makerere University School of Medicine and Head of Pathology Department at Makerere University
- Wilbrod Humphreys Owor - businessman, bank executive, and management consultant
- Emmanuel Blayo Wakhweya - Idi Amin's Finance Minister; longest serving member of his cabinet
- Amos Wekesa - businessman, entrepreneur and corporate executive
- Sam Kiwanuka - senior military officer in the Uganda People's Defence Forces
- Richard Musani - chartered marketing executive, SME consultant, automotive expert and business columnist
- Vinand Nantulya - physician, pathologist, medical researcher, entrepreneur and academic administrator

== See also ==
- Education in Uganda
- List of schools in Uganda
