= Livingstone Luboobi =

Ugandan mathematician (1944–2025)

Vice-Chancellor of Makerere University
- In office 2004–2009
- Preceded by: John Ssebuwufu
- Succeeded by: Lillian Tibatemwa‑Ekirikubinza

Personal details
- Born: Livingstone Sserwadda Luboobi; 25 December 1944 Mitondo, Rakai District, Protectorate of Uganda
- Died: 16 July 2025 (aged 80) Kampala, Uganda
- Education: Makerere University; University of Toronto; University of Adelaide
- Occupation: Mathematician
- Awards: Uganda National Gold Medal Ward; Makerere University Life Time achievement Award
- Website: Makerere University official website

Livingstone Sserwadda Luboobi (25 December 1944 – 16 July 2025) was a Ugandan mathematician and academic administrator. He earned degrees in mathematics from Makerere University, the University of Toronto, and the University of Adelaide, and began his academic career at Makerere University in the 1970s, where he was a professor of biomathematics and served as vice-chancellor from 2004 to 2009. He also held an adjunct professorship at the Nelson Mandela African Institution of Science and Technology between 2013 and 2017.

Luboobi was a founding leader of the African Society for Biomathematics, the chairman of the Ugandan Mathematical Society, and a member of the Uganda National Council for Science and Technology. He was an elected fellow of the Uganda National Academy of Sciences. His research areas covered mathematical modelling for infectious diseases in East Africa such as Ebola, HIV/AIDS, malaria, Rift Valley fever, and trypanosomiasis.

== Early life and education ==
Livingstone Sserwadda Luboobi was born on 25 December 1944 in Mitondo village, Rakai District, Uganda, to Lameka and Sanyu Serwadda, both farmers. Luboobi began his primary education at Kakooma in Lwanti, Kooki, before transferring to Matale Primary School in Kalisizo. He later attended Kako Junior Secondary School from 1959 to 1960. Between 1961 and 1967, he pursued his O-Level education at Ntare School in Mbarara. In 1965, he enrolled at Makerere College School for his A-Level studies, initially focusing on physics, chemistry, and mathematics. He later opted to replace chemistry with double mathematics, and has stated that he taught himself after being told by the headmaster that they lacked a teacher qualified to teach the subject. He earned three As.

Luboobi obtained his Bachelor of Science in mathematics with a First Class Honour from Makerere University in 1970. He proceeded to the University of Toronto to obtain his master's degree in Operations Research in 1972. He then moved to University of Adelaide in Australia where he completed his Ph.D. in Applied Mathematics (Biomathematics) in 1980.

== Career ==
Luboobi graduated from Makerere University in 1970 and began his career in the same year as a special assistant. He was promoted to a lecturer in 1973, became a senior lecturer in 1977, promoted to associate professor in 1985 and became a full professor of biomathematics at Makerere University in 1997. He served as the head of department of mathematics for one year, between 1990 and 1991. He was appointed the dean of science for two terms, between 1994 and 2001. He served as the vice chancellor of the university between 2004 and 2009 when he succeeded Prof. John Ssebuwufu. He also served as adjunct professor for the Nelson Mandela African Institution of Science and Technology (NMAIST) between July 2013 and June 2017.

Livingstone's research primarily centered on biomathematics in East Africa with a particular focus on mathematical epidemiology that covered mathematical modelling for infectious diseases such as Ebola, HIV/AIDS, malaria, Rift Valley fever, and trypanosomiasis.

== Memberships and awards ==
Luboobi was the inaugural president of the African Society for Biomathematics. In 1989, he was elected as the president of Uganda Mathematical Society. He was also a member of the Uganda National Council for Science and Technology, and an elected fellow of Uganda National Academy of Sciences.

Luboobi coordinated a long-term collaboration between Makerere University and the University of Bergen. In 2008, the University of Bergen awarded him an honorary doctorate for fostering international collaboration. On 29 June 2013, he received a Lifetime Achievement Award from the University of Makerere making reference to his leadership and academic activities. In the same year during the 51st anniversary of Uganda, Luboobi received a National Gold Medal from the head of state of the country, Yoweri Kaguta Museveni.

== Death and legacy ==
Luboobi was diagnosed with lymphoma and received treatment at the Uganda Cancer Institute. He was later referred to Mulago National Referral Hospital, where he died on 16 July 2025 five years after the death of his wife, Ruth Mwandha Luboobi, in 2020. His funeral service was held at St. Francis Chapel, Makerere University, on 18 July 2025. He was survived by seven children, including Professor Daniel Kibuule and Dr. Irene Nakiyimba, and several grandchildren.

Luboobi's death prompted tributes from several notable academics, including the Vice Chancellor of Makerere University, Professor Barnabas Nawangwe. Nawangwe described Luboobi as a visionary leader who played a key role in transforming Makerere into a research-led institution. He noted that Luboobi was instrumental in drafting the university's research strategy, which enabled the institution to secure over 300 research grants in a single year. Many of the university's current research policies are also attributed to initiatives developed during Luboobi's tenure.

== Selected publications ==
- Mbogo, Waema R.; Luboobi, Livingstone S.; Odhiambo, John W. (29 April 2013). "Stochastic Model for In-Host HIV Dynamics with Therapeutic Intervention". ISRN Biomathematics. 2013: 1–11. doi:10.1155/2013/103708. ISSN 2090-7702.
- Munabi, Ian G.; Luboga, Samuel Abilemech; Luboobi, Livingstone; Mirembe, Florence (2016). "Association between Maternal Pelvis Height and Intrapartum Foetal Head Moulding in Ugandan Mothers with Spontaneous Vertex Deliveries". Obstetrics and Gynecology International. 2016: 1–7. doi:10.1155/2016/3815295. ISSN 1687-9589. PMC 4789430. PMID 27034678.
- Remo, Flavia; Luboobi, Livingstone S.; Mabalawata, Isambi Sailon; Nannyonga, Betty K. (2018). "A mathematical model for the dynamics and MCMC analysis of tomato bacterial wilt disease". International Journal of Biomathematics. 11 (1): 1850001. doi:10.1142/S1793524518500018. ISSN 1793-5245.
- Ngeleja, Rigobert C.; Luboobi, Livingstone S.; Nkansah-Gyekye, Yaw (2017). "The Effect of Seasonal Weather Variation on the Dynamics of the Plague Disease". International Journal of Mathematics and Mathematical Sciences. 2017: 1–25. doi:10.1155/2017/5058085. ISSN 0161-1712.
- Remo, Flavia; Luboobi, Livingstone S.; Mabalawata, Isambi Sailon; Nannyonga, Betty K. (2018). "A mathematical model for the dynamics and MCMC analysis of tomato bacterial wilt disease". International Journal of Biomathematics. 11 (1): 1850001. doi:10.1142/S1793524518500018. ISSN 1793-5245.
- Ngeleja, Rigobert C.; Luboobi, Livingstone S.; Nkansah-Gyekye, Yaw (2017). "The Effect of Seasonal Weather Variation on the Dynamics of the Plague Disease". International Journal of Mathematics and Mathematical Sciences. 2017: 1–25. doi:10.1155/2017/5058085. ISSN 0161-1712.
- Ngina, Purity; Mbogo, Rachel Waema; Luboobi, Livingstone S. (14 November 2017). "The In Vivo Dynamics of HIV Infection with the Influence of Cytotoxic T Lymphocyte Cells". International Scholarly Research Notices. 2017: 1–10. doi:10.1155/2017/2124789. ISSN 2356-7872. PMC 5734002. PMID 29349288.
