= Okin Ojara =

Ugandan politician

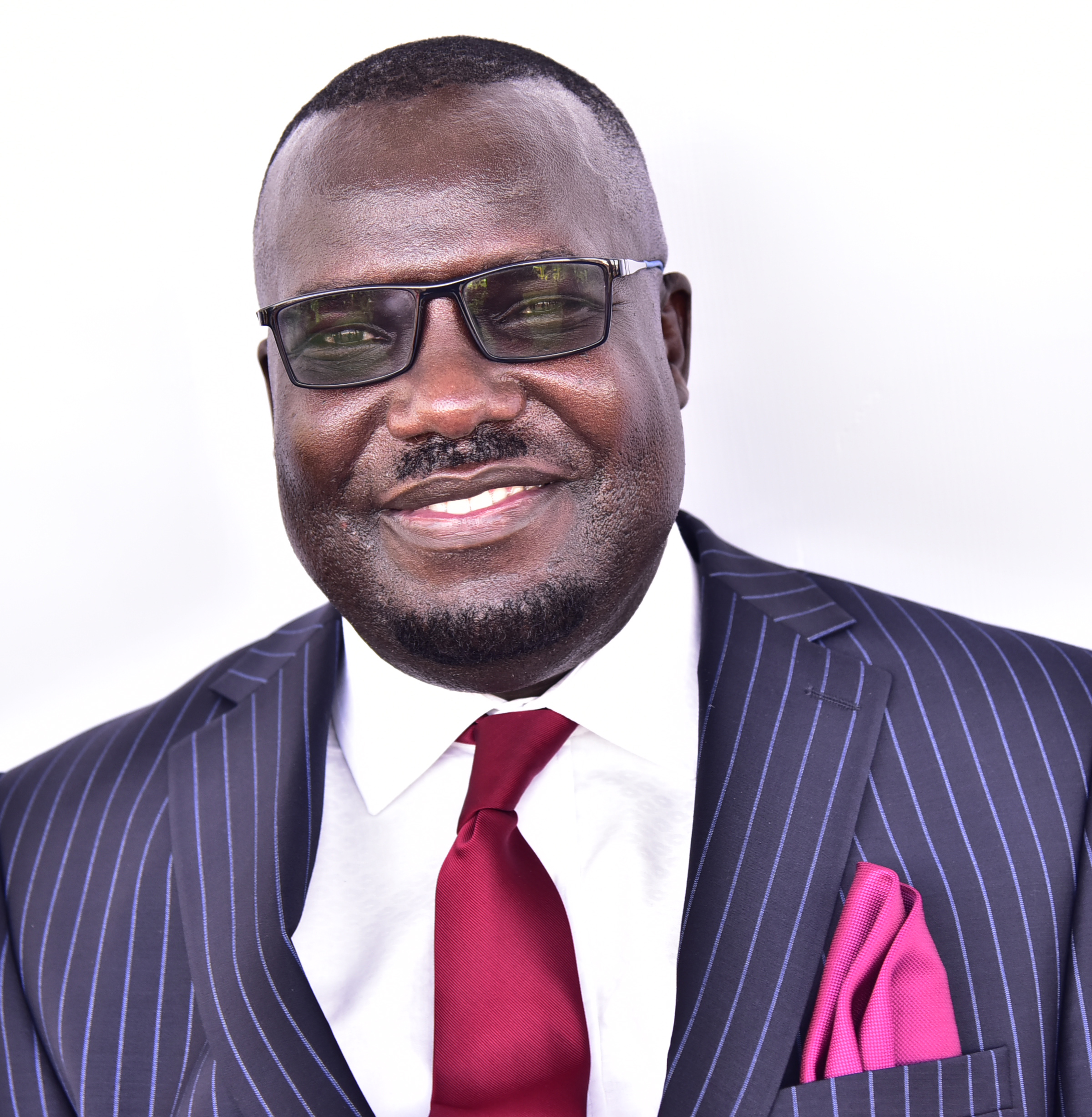
- Ojara in 2015

Honorable

Personal details
- Born: Okin Ojara; 26 May 1971 (age 55) Kitgum, Uganda
- Education: Makerere University (Bachelor of Social Work and Social Administration); Trinity College, Dublin (M.Phil. International Peace Studies)
- Occupation: Social worker, politician
- Known for: Social work, politics

Philip Polly Okin Ojara (born 26 May 1971) is a Ugandan social worker and politician. He is the elected member of parliament for Chua West County, Kitgum District, and is an Independent politician who closely associates with FDC, the once main opposition party in Uganda. He was a member of the Caucus of Independent MPs and the Opposition Caucus and also served as the vice chairperson of the Committee on Local Government Accounts and as a member of the Appointments Committee and the Committee on Agriculture in the 10th Parliament of Uganda.

Ojara is the chairperson of the select committee to investigate alleged mismanagement in Uganda Telecom (UTL) and a founder member of the Parliament Public Finance Management Forum. Also, he iwasa a member of both the Parliamentary Forum on Climate Change and the Uganda Parliamentary Prayer Breakfast Fellowship.

In the 11th parliament, Ojara represented the people of Chua West County under the Forum for Democratic Change (FDC) party.

In the January 2026 general elections, he contested to retain the seat but was defeated by Simon Peter Oryema Adum who serves under the 12th parliament (2026-2031) belonging to the National Resistance Movement (NRM) party.

== Early life and education ==
Ojara was born in Kitgum, Acholi sub-region, on 26 May 1971 in an Anglican family of the Acholi. He had his primary education in his home town of Kitgum and attained his PLE certification in 1987.

He then attended Lango College for his O-Level education and Sir Samuel Baker Secondary School for his A-Level education, attaining a UCE certification in 1991 and a UACE certification in 1994.

Ojara further advanced to Makerere University, where he attained a bachelor's degree in social work and social administration in 1997. He then went to Trinity College, Dublin, graduating in 2006 with a Master of Philosophy in international peace studies.

== Career and politics ==
Ojara started his professional career in 1998 after attaining his bachelor's degree and worked as a program officer for the International Rescue Committee (IRC) up until 1999 when he secured employment as a project officer for Save the Children. In 2002, he left the children's rights organization for Acholi Religious Leaders Peace Initiative (ARLPI), an interfaith peace building and conflict transformation organization, where he worked as a program coordinator for three years. In 2005, he joined UNDP Uganda for a one year spell as a District Disaster Preparedness Coordinator in the Office of the Prime Minister (OPM).

In 2007, Ojara secured employment at the Cooperative for Assistance and Relief Everywhere (CARE International, Uganda) where he worked as a team leader up until 2009 when he was recruited as a senior technical advisor by UNDP South Sudan. In 2013, he worked as a distributor for Total Uganda before serving as the Prime Minister Acholi Kingdom in 2014 up until 2015 when he resigned to join active politics.

In 2015, Ojara joined elective politics as an independent politician and strategized for the 2016 polls, a move that heavily contributed to his victory in the 2016 general elections thereby becoming a member of the 10th Parliament for the Pearl of Africa representing Chua West County in Kitgum District. In the 10th Parliament, Ojara serves as the vice chairperson of the Committee on Local Government Accounts and as a member of the Appointments Committee and the Committee on Agriculture. In December 2016, Ojara was appointed by the speaker of parliament as the chairperson of the select committee to investigate alleged mismanagement in Uganda Telecom.

In the eleventh parliament he serves on the Committee on Foreign Affairs.

== Private details ==
Ojara is a married man with a number of children. He is passionate about civil rights and social action, economic empowerment, education, health, human-rights, politics and poverty alleviation issues.

== See also ==
- Kitgum District
- Parliament of Uganda
