= Sam Kiwanuka =

Ugandan general

Major General Sam Kiwanuka
- Born: 1965 (age 60–61); Uganda
- Citizenship: Uganda
- Education: St. Peter's College Tororo; Tanzania Military Academy
- Occupation: Military officer
- Years active: 1981 — present
- Known for: Military matters
- Title: Uganda's Military Attaché to Ethiopia

Major General Sam Kiwanuka (born c. 1965), is a senior military officer in the Uganda People's Defence Forces (UPDF), who serves as Uganda's Military Attaché to Ethiopia, based at Uganda's embassy in Addis Ababa.

== Background and education ==
He was born in Uganda circa 1965. He attended primary school locally. He joined St. Peter's College Tororo to pursue secondary education. While there, he was recruited by the National Resistance Army (NRA) during the Ugandan Bush War. Following the end of that war, he was sent to the Tanzania Military Academy, in Monduli District, Arusha Region for military training. He has attended further military courses, both inside and outside Uganda.

== Work experience ==
Sam Kiwanuka joined the NRA on 4 November 1981, when he was a 16 year old secondary school student. He was attached to the 9th NRA Battalion, under the command of Brigadier Julius Chihandae. The 9th battalion was deployed in Kabale District to guard against a possible attack by Uganda National Liberation Army soldiers from Rwanda.

After the end of that war, Kiwanuka was promoted to the rank of Captain and dispatched to Monduli Military Academy, in Tanzania, to attend a Company Commanders' Course. From there, he returned to Uganda and has served in UPDF operations in the Northern Region of Uganda and in South Sudan. Before his current assignment, he has served as Uganda’s military attaché to Kenya, South Sudan and Somalia.

== Other considerations ==
In February 2019, Sam Kiwanuka was promoted from the rank of Brigadier to that of Major General.

== See also ==
- List of military schools in Uganda
- African Union
- Katumba Wamala
- Kasirye Ggwanga
- Elly Kayanja
