= Senteza Kajubi =

Ugandan academic

- Born: 24 December 1926; Uganda
- Died: 1 May 2012 (aged 85); Bugolobi, Kampala, Uganda
- Citizenship: Uganda
- Education: Makerere University (Bachelor of Arts) (Diploma in Education); University of Chicago (Master of Science in geography); Mbarara University (Honorary Doctor of Science)
- Occupations: University administrator, academic and community leader
- Years active: 1950–2012
- Known for: Academic leadership

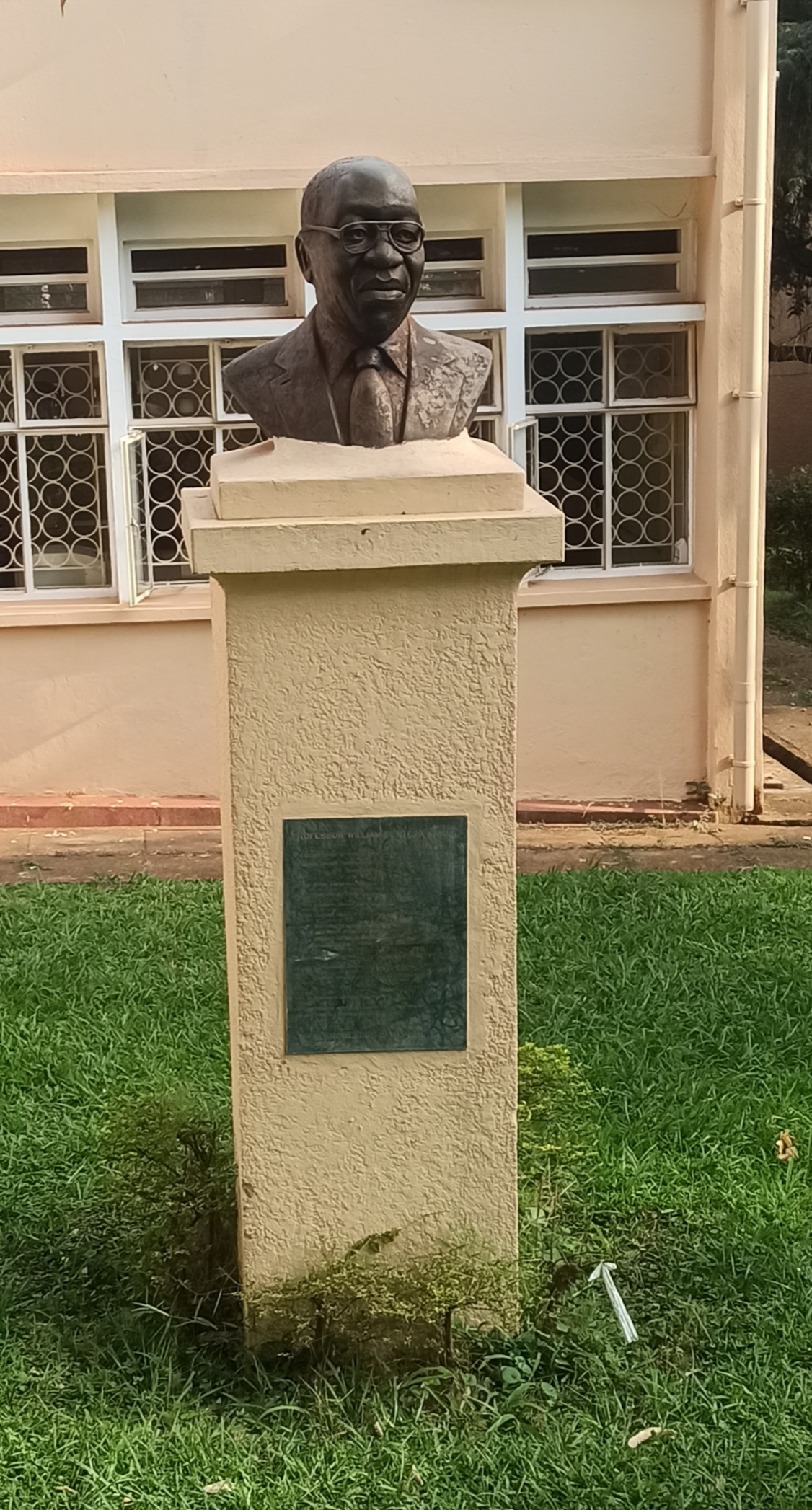
Monument of Senteza Kajubi

George William Senteza Kajubi, BA, Dip.Ed, MSc, ScD, (24 December 1926 – 1 May 2012) was a university administrator, academic, and community leader in Uganda, the third-largest economy in the East African Community.

== Background ==
He was born in Kireku Village, Ssingo County, in present-day Mityana District of the Central Region in 1926, the first-born of his parents. His father was Yoweri Bugonzi Kajubi, a postal driver for over 40 years. His mother was Bulanina Namukomya. The family eventually settled in Busega, a suburb of Kampala, the capital and largest city of Uganda.

== Education ==
His early education took him through Mackay Primary school (1934-1940) and Mengo Junior Secondary School (1941-1942), in central Kampala. From 1943 until 1946, he attended King's College Budo, a high school in the Central Region. From 1947 until 1950, he studied at Makerere University, the oldest and largest public university in Uganda, graduating with a Bachelor of Arts with the Diploma in Education. He then attended the University of Chicago, in Chicago, United States from 1952 to 1955, on a Fulbright Scholarship, graduating with a Master of Science in geography. On 30 January 2010, Mbarara University awarded him an Honorary Doctor of Science degree.

== Work experience ==
After graduating from Makerere, he taught at Kako Junior Secondary School from 1951 until 1952. Following his return from graduate studies in Chicago, he taught at Kings College Budo from 1955 until 1960. He then became a lecturer at Makerere University, he was later promoted to senior lecturer. From 1964 until 1977, he served as the director of the National Institute of Education at Makerere University. From 1977 until 1979, he served as the vice-chancellor of Makerere University. In 1979, he was appointed a professor of higher education at Makerere. From 1986 until 1990, he served as the principal of the Kyambogo Institute of Higher Education, a component of Kyambogo University, a public institution. In 1990, he was re-appointed vice-chancellor of Makerere University, serving in that capacity until 1993. In 1994, he was appointed vice-chancellor of Nkumba University, a private institution, serving in that capacity until his retirement in 2008.

== Other achievements ==
Among his achievements are:

1. First African Fulbright Scholar to the U.S. (1952)

2. In 1961, Kajubi appeared on The Prospects of Mankind television program as part of the launching of the Peace Corps program. Panelists included First Lady Eleanor Roosevelt, Sargent Shriver, Senator Hubert Horatio Humphrey Jr - Who later, went on to become Vice President of The United States under President Lyndon B. Johnson and Prof Hayes, while President Kennedy launched the Peace Corps Program from the White House. Uganda received the first Peace Corps group of American teachers.

3. In 1961, chaired the National Symbols committee that selected Uganda's National Anthem, Uganda's National Flag and Uganda's Coat of Arms.

4. Member of the executive committee of the Democratic Party (DP) of Uganda and Personal Advisor to the party President (1961 - 1962)

5. The Republic of Uganda Distinguished Service Medal (1963,1971 & 2009)

6. Teachers College, Columbia University, USA. Medal for Distinguished Service. presented by President Lyndon B. Johnson. Recognized as "A wise and sensitive leader among his nation's educators, a thoughtful guide to his teaching colleagues, a most valued supporter of the multi- national afro-anglo-american (AAA) Program in Teacher Education and first Chairman of the Association for Teacher Education in Africa (ATEA); Exemplar and guide for his fellow educators,"

7. Member of Board of Directors, Bank of Uganda, 1967 - 1969

8. Secretary General, Uganda Teachers' Association 1959 - 1962

a. Member of the 1963 Uganda Education Policy Review Commission chaired by Prof Edgar B. Castle tasked to review the educational policy of Uganda, following independence.

b. First Chairman, Association for Teacher Education in Africa (ATEA), 1969 - 1973

c. Vice-president, International Council on Education for Teaching (ICET) 1971 - 1975

d. Chairman, Regional council for Teacher Education in Eastern Africa 1971 - 1977

9. Chairman, Draper's Ltd (Department & Supermarket Chain) 1971 - 1989

10. Member of East African Legislative Assembly (EALA) 1971 - 1976

a. Chairman, Salaries Review Commission for the East African Community General Fund Services 1971 - 1972 & 1974 - 1976

b. Chairman of East African Airways Corporation Central Negotiating Council 1972 - 1976

11. Consultant for the National Education System of Namibia at independence 1990

12. Chairman, G.M.Combined (First detergent manufacturing company in Uganda) 1990 - 1995

13. Delegate of Constituent Assembly - Representing Kyaddondo North (1994 - 1995) which drafted a new constitution for Uganda in which Kajubi unsuccessfully advocated the implementation of multi-party system, good governance and transparency in a federal arrangement that would accommodate Uganda's diverse regional interests.

14. Between 1987 and 1989, he chaired the education review commission resulting in a White Paper titled the Kajubi Report, which recommended the implementation of Universal Primary Education (UPE). The report was accepted by the cabinet in 1992 and is currently in the process of being implemented.

15. Chairman, Uganda Population Policy Review commission 1992

16. Buganda Government Medal "Ekitiibwa Ky'Amafumu n'Engabo" (2011)

== Works ==
- "African Encyclopaedia" Oxford University Press (1974)

== Personal details ==
Together with his wife, the Kajubi's were the parents of nine children with three sets of twins. The majority of the now adult children live in the United States, where they migrated to pursue higher education in the late 1970s.

Kajubi was an important and influential member of the Ugandan Democratic Party. He was one of the first among Uganda's African elite to join the party in 1958, working closely with its leader Benedicto Kiwanuka to expand its reach.

== Final days ==
On the morning of 1 May 2012, Kajubi, a widower, collapsed at his home. He was discovered by one of his two adult children who lived with him. He was carried to Mulago National Referral Hospital, where he was pronounced dead on arrival. Following a period of national mourning, which included a period of lying in state at the Parliament Building and in his residence at Bugolobi, a Kampala suburb, his remains were buried at Maya Village, approximately 25 kilometres (16 mi), by road, southwest of Kampala, on 5 May 2012.

== Succession table as Vice-Chancellor of Makerere University, First Time ==
Preceded by Asavia Wandira; 1973 – 1975	Vice Chancellor of Makerere University; 1977 – 1979	Succeeded by Asavia Wandira; 1979 – 1986

== Succession table as Vice-Chancellor of Makerere University, Second Time ==
Preceded by George Kirya; 1986 – 1990	Vice Chancellor of Makerere University; 1990 – 1993	Succeeded by John Ssebuwufu; 1993 – 2004
