= George Kirya =

Ugandan academic

- Born: 1939 (age 86–87); Ngora Hospital, Ngora Town; Ngora District, Uganda
- Citizenship: Ugandan
- Education: Makerere University (Bachelor of Medicine and Bachelor of Surgery) (Master of Medicine in Microbiology); University of Birmingham (Master of Science in Microbiology) (Honorary Doctor of Laws); University of Manchester (Diploma in Bacteriology)
- Occupations: Physician, researcher, academic
- Years active: 1966 – present
- Known for: Medical practice and research
- Title: Former Chairman, Uganda Health Services Commission

George Barnabas Kirya (born 1939) is a Ugandan physician, academic, microbiologist, politician, and diplomat. He served as the chairman of the Uganda Health Services Commission from 2007 to 2012. Previously, from 1997 until 2003, he served as Uganda's High Commissioner to the United Kingdom.

== Background and education ==
He was born at Ngora Hospital to Joshua Kirya, a Mugwere from the Eastern Region, and Miriam Najjemba a Muganda from Uganda's Central Region. Kirya attended Busoga College Mwiri for his O-Level studies.

He then transferred to Mbale Secondary School for his A-Level education. In 1961, he entered the Makerere University School of Medicine, where he graduated with a Bachelor of Medicine and Bachelor of Surgery degree in 1966. Following his internship at Mulago Hospital, Kirya joined the Master of Medicine postgraduate program, specializing in microbiology. He then obtained a Master of Science in Microbiology in 1971 from the University of Birmingham in the United Kingdom. His diploma in Bacteriology was obtained from the University of Manchester in 1975. In 2001, in recognition of his service as a diplomat, the University of Birmingham awarded him an honorary Doctor of Laws degree.

== Career ==
Upon graduation from the MMed program at Makerere, he joined the East African Virus Research Institute (EAVRI), a department of the East African Community, which is now known as the Uganda Virus Research Institute. He served as a research officer before becoming the principal medical research officer and head of arbovirology at EAVRI.

From 1970 until 1973, he served as visiting lecturer in the Department of Microbiology at Makerere University School of Medicine. From 1973 to 1975, he was a senior lecturer at Makerere, teaching microbiology, surveillance, and research at undergraduate and post-graduate levels. He served as a professor and head of the Department of Medical Microbiology at Makerere from 1978 until 1986.

From April 1986 until November 1990, he served as Vice-Chancellor of Makerere University, Uganda's largest public university. In 1997, he was appointed Uganda's High Commissioner to the United Kingdom, serving in that position until 2003.

He returned to Uganda in 2003 and was appointed chairman of the Uganda Health Services Commission, serving in that capacity until 2012. Between 2007 and 2011, he served as the Chancellor of Lugazi University.

== Other responsibilities ==
Professor George Kirya has written extensively in peer journals in the field of virology, with emphasis on arbovirology. He also writes articles in Ugandan, nationally circulated English language newspapers. He is the Chairman of the board of directors of THETA, a Ugandan NGO that aims "to improve health and access to health care through promotion of collaboration between the traditional and biomedical health care systems".

== See also ==
- Bagwere
- Pallisa District

Preceded by Asavia Wandira	Vice Chancellor of Makerere University; 1986–1990	Succeeded by Senteza Kajubi
