= Elly Katunguka =

Ugandan academic

Eli Katunguka
- Born: 1955 (age 70–71); Uganda
- Citizenship: Uganda
- Education: Makerere University; University of Glasgow
- Occupations: Veterinarian, academic administrator
- Years active: 1980–present
- Known for: Administrative skills
- Title: Vice Chancellor; Kyambogo University

Eli Katunguka-Rwakishaya is a Ugandan veterinarian, academic and academic administrator. He is the Vice Chancellor of Kyambogo University, one of Uganda's public universities. He was appointed to that position in February 2014. Prior to that, he served at the Director of Postgraduate studies at Makerere University, the oldest and largest public university in the country.

== Background and education ==
He was born in the Western Region of Uganda circa 1955. He attended Ntare School for his high school education. He studied at Makerere University, Uganda's oldest and largest public university, graduating with a Bachelor of Veterinary Medicine degree. He went on to earn a Master of Veterinary Science degree, also from Makerere. His Doctor of Philosophy was obtained from the University of Glasgow in Scotland.

== Career ==
Starting in 1979, Katunguka worked at Makerere University, starting as a teaching assistant and then assistant lecturer, lecturer, senior lecturer, associate professor, and full professor. For twenty years, Katunguka was part of the senior academicians and academic administrators at the university.

In February 2014, he was appointed acting vice chancellor of Kyambogo University. In March 2019, he was appointed as Chairman of the Uganda National Council for Higher Education (UNCHE), for the next five years.

== Publications ==
- Serum biochemical changes in experimental Trypanosoma congolense and Trypanosoma brucei infection in Small East Africa goats. The study investigated serum biochemical changes in goats challenged with either Trypanosoma congolense or Trypanosoma brucei and uninfected controls.
- Livestock trypanosomosis in Uganda: parasite heterogeneity and anaemia status of naturally infected cattle, goats and pigs. The study established that trypanosomosis is a major cause of anaemia in livestock in endemic areas. Cattle were the major animal species affected by trypanosomosis.
- Effect of praziquantel treatment of Schistosoma mansoni during pregnancy on intensity of infection and antibody responses to schistosome antigens: results of a randomised, placebo-controlled trial. This article evaluated the effects on infection intensity and the immunological effects of praziquantel treatment against Schistosoma mansoni during pregnancy, compared with treatment after delivery.
- Handbook on livestock nutrition.
- The effect of praziquantel treatment on immune responses against Schistosomiasis mansoni during pregnancy: Cytokine and antibody responses in pregnant women and their infants.

== See also ==
- John Ssebuwufu
- List of university leaders in Uganda
