= Hannington Sengendo =

Ugandan academic, urban planner and academic administrator

- Born: 14 November 1954 (age 71); Uganda
- Citizenship: Uganda
- Education: Makerere University (Diploma in Education) (Bachelor of Arts); University of Leeds (MA in Geography); University of Nottingham (PhD in Urban Planning)
- Occupations: Academic Administrator & Urban Planner
- Years active: 1974–present
- Known for: Academics
- Title: Vice Chancellor; Nkumba University

Hannington Sengendo (born 14 November 1954) is a Ugandan academic, urban planner and academic administrator. Currently, he is the vice chancellor of Nkumba University, a private University in Uganda, which was accredited by the Uganda National Council for Higher Education in 1999. He was installed in that position on Friday 21 June 2013.

== Background ==
Sengendo was born in Kampala, Uganda's capital and largest city, on 14 November 1954.

== Education ==
Sengendo attended Mengo Primary School. He studied at Mengo Senior Secondary School, for his O-Level education. He then attended Kololo Senior Secondary School for his A-Level studies. In 1975, he entered National Teachers College Kyambogo to study for the two-year Diploma in Education. The diploma was awarded by Makerere University. National Teachers College was amalgamated with other institutions in 2001 to form Kyambogo University.

Sengendo also holds a Bachelor of Arts degree from Makerere University and the degree of Master of Arts in Human Geography, obtained in 1987, from the University of Leeds. His degree of Doctorate in Urban Planning (PhD), was obtained in 1992, from the University of Nottingham.

== Work history ==
His long service at Makerere University, included as Head of the Geography Department from 1994 until 2000. Later, he served as the Dean of the Faculty of Arts at the university. He then moved to Nkumba University, serving there as the deputy vice chancellor, before he was appointed vice chancellor in June 2013.

== Personal life ==
Sengendo is a married father. He is of the Christian faith.

== See also ==
- Uganda Universities
- UG Business Schools
- UG University Leaders
- Uganda Education
- Entebbe
