= Ronald Kibuule =

Ugandan politician

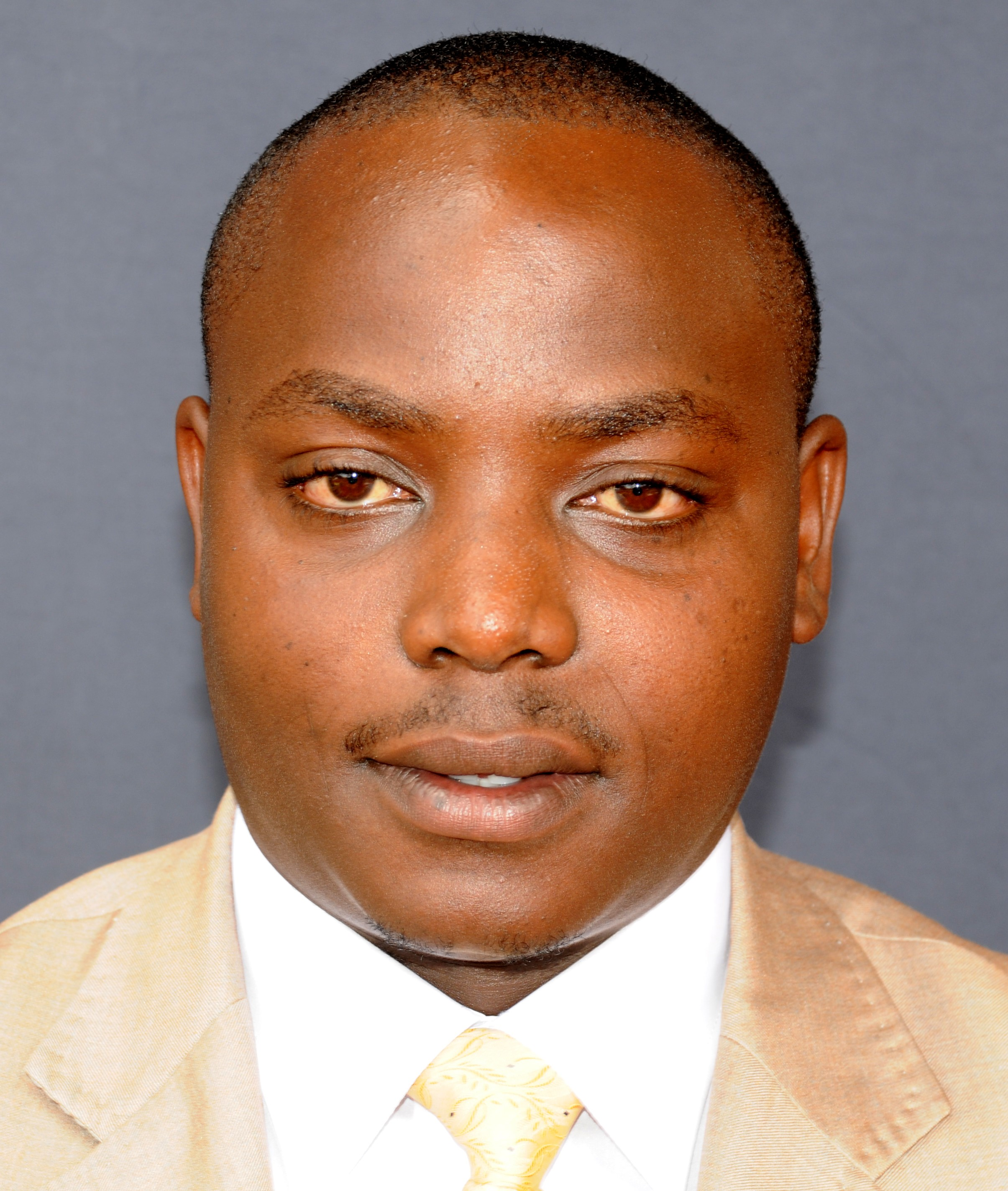
- Born: 20 January 1984 (age 42); Uganda
- Citizenship: Uganda
- Education: Uganda Christian University (Bachelor of Social Work & Social Administration)
- Occupations: Social Worker and politician
- Years active: 2006 — present
- Known for: Politics
- Title: State Minister for Water Resources
- Spouse(s): Esther Kibuule & Fortunate Kibuule

Ronald Kibuule is a Ugandan politician, known for his conservative views and controverse. He was the State Minister for Water Resources in the Ugandan Cabinet. a position which he held from 1 March 2015, replacing Betty Oyella Bigombe. From 27 May 2011 until 1 March 2015, he served as the State Minister for Youth and Children. In 2021 he lost his Membership of Parliament for Mukono County North to Abdallah Kiwanuka commonly known as Mulima mayuuni.

Propaga says he attempted to use military force to overturn the Election something he denies to date.

== Early life and education ==
Kibuule was born on 20 January 1984 in Kasenge Village, Nama sub-county to Zefania Lusebeya, a businessman, and Grace Naguta, a housewife. He attended St. John's Education Center, in Mukono Town, and completed his primary leaving examination there. He then joined Mukono Parents High School where he completed his O-Level education in 2002 and his A-Level education in 2004. He was admitted to Uganda Christian University in 2003. He studied social work, graduating in 2008 with a Bachelor of Social Work & Social Administration degree.

== Career ==
While still in elementary school, Kibuule acted in a school play where he played the character of the President of Uganda. The guest of honor at that function was Al Hajji Moses Kigongo, the vice chairman of the ruling National Resistance Movement (NRM) political party. Kigongo took an interest in Kibuule and over time he became a close acquaintance. He introduced the young man to NRM leaders, including Amama Mbabazi, the party's secretary general, and Yoweri Museveni, the party's chairman and the President of Uganda. Kibuule became close to Mbabazi, who became his guardian and benefactor. Mbabazi, at that time the Minister of Security, paid Kibuule's school fees at high school and at university. The young man became an aide to this high-ranking cabinet minister. Between 2006 and 2011, he served as a councilor for Kasenge Parish in Nama-sub-county. In 2011, he won the Mukono County North parliamentary seat. During his tenure in Mukono District and national politics, he has made friends with many Chinese investors who have set up industries, factories, and warehouses in Mukono District, especially along the Kampala-Jinja Highway.

== Controversy ==
In 2013, Kibuule made controversial statements indicating that police should charge the victims of rape if they are indecently dressed. While addressing youth in Kajara County, Ntungamo District, he said that police should establish the dress of rape victims and set rapists free if the victims are indecently dressed. Kibuule considers indecent dress to include bikinis, miniskirts, and tight jeans. His comments drew strong criticism, with Members of Parliament urging him to "have self-control", demanding an apology, and questioning why he would mislead men "by saying that it is okay for them to go ahead and rape women who put on short skirts." In a statement on the floor of the House, the minister said his statements had been misunderstood.

In August 2016 Kibuule was accused of assaulting a female guard This led to a complaint by human right organisation Chapter Four. Kibuule went to a bank and refused to be inspected by security guard Hellen Obuk. He started a verbal assault and tried to hit her. Later, a group of about 6 police officers on 2 patrol pick-ups from Mukono Police Station under the command of the District Police Commander ASP Fred Ahimbisibwe arrested Hellen Obuk. She was physically and mentally abused and had to be taken to hospital.

In 2017, during the debate about age limit, he brought a gun to parliament and threatened MP Ibrahim Ssemuju. He was suspended by parliament chairwoman Kadaga.

Also in 2017, he was alleged to have threatened David Mussis Kalyankolo, a Bukedde Television correspondent in Mukono District. It is alleged that the Minister bought 85 acres of land from a one Musa Kateregga located at Kigaya Landing site in Najja subcounty, Buikwe District in Eastern Uganda having tenants but declined to compensate them.

In February 2021 Ronald Kibuule was accused of aiding the kidnap and torture of the National Unity Platform supporters in Mukono North. In the elections of January 14, Kibuule was defeated by Abdallah Kiwanuka. He tried to overturn his loss by sending military to force the Electoral Commission to have him announced as the winner, but he failed.

== Personal life ==
Salongo Kibuule is married to two wives, Fortunate Kibuule and Esther Kibuule, and he is a father of great sons & daughters, Natasha, Orishaba, Victoria, Samantha, etc. In 2019, he lost his twins Kato and Wasswa in the home swimming pool

== See also ==
- Politics of Uganda
