= Lugazi University =

Ugandan Uinversity

Lugazi University (LU)
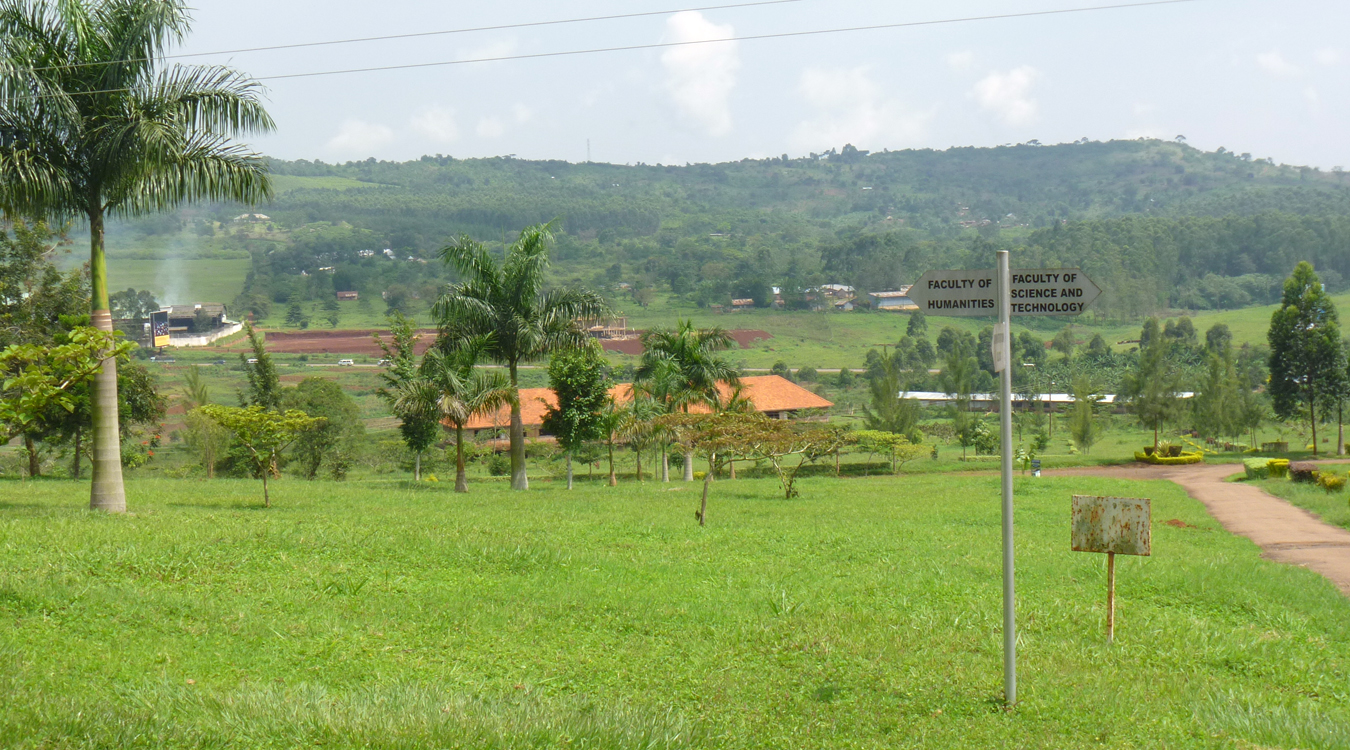
- Motto: Strive for Prominence
- Type: Private
- Active: 2007–2010
- Chancellor: Professor George B. Kirya
- Vice-Chancellor: Matthew Odada
- Students: 800 (2008)
- Location: Lugazi, Uganda; 00°22′12″N 32°54′47″E
- Campus: Urban
- Website: Homepage

Lugazi University (LU), was a private university in Uganda. The university was founded in 2007. It closed in December 2010.

== Location ==
Lugazi University was located in Lugazi, on a 175-acre (0.71 km^{2}) campus, 26 miles (42 km) east of Kampala on the Kampala-Jinja Highway.

== Academics ==
In September 2007, the university had the following faculties and departments:

- Faculty of Education
- Faculty of Arts
- Faculty of Law
- Faculty of Social Sciences
- Faculty of Business Management
- Faculty of Science & Technology

== Courses ==
Lugazi University offered courses leading to the award of degrees, diplomas and certificates.

=== Department of Arts and Social Sciences ===
- Bachelor of Secretarial Studies
- Bachelor of Mass Communication
- Bachelor Social Work and Social Administration
- Bachelor of Industrial Art and Design
- Bachelor of Development Studies
- Bachelor of Public Administration and Management
- Bachelor of Employment and Labor Studies

=== Department of Education ===
- Bachelor of Arts with Education
- Bachelor of Science with Education
- Bachelor of Adult and Community Education
- Bachelor of Education Guidance and Counseling
- Bachelor of Education with Special Needs
- Bachelor of Education - Early Childhood

=== Department of Business Management ===
- Bachelor of Business Administration
- Bachelor of Commerce
- Bachelor of Human Resources Management
- Bachelor of Procurement and Logistics Management
- Bachelor of Public Sector and Management
- Bachelor of Entrepreneurship and Small Business Management

=== Department of Computing and Information Technology ===
- Bachelor of Computer Science
- Bachelor of Library and Information Science
- Bachelor of Information Technology
- Bachelor of Science in Human Nutrition and Dietetics

All the above courses are available at diploma level as well.

== Closure ==
Lugazi University held its first and last graduation ceremony on Wednesday, 29 December 2010. 524 students graduated. Due to mounting debts and other financial hardships, the university's assets and liabilities were acquired by the Uganda Ministry of Defence, effective 30 December 2010. In January 2011, the premises were converted into the University of Military Science and Technology, (UMST), a military school of tertiary leaning, within the Uganda People's Defence Force.

== See also ==
- List of universities in Uganda
- Education in Uganda
