= Zerubabel Nyiira =

Ugandan politician

Zerubabel Mijumbi Nyiira
- Born: 29 February 1940 (age 86); Uganda
- Education: California Polytechnic State University (Bachelor of Science in Agriculture); Makerere University (Master of Science in Agriculture); University of Nairobi (Doctor of Philosophy in Agriculture)
- Occupations: Agriculturalist & Politician
- Years active: 1969 - present
- Title: State Minister of Fisheries; Ugandan Cabinet

Zerubabel Mijumbi Nyiira is a Ugandan agriculturalist and politician. He served in the Cabinet of Uganda as State Minister of Agriculture from 27 May 2011 to 1 March 2015 and State Minister of Fisheries from 1 March 2015 to 6 June 2016. Zerubabel Nyiira is also the elected Member of Parliament for Buruuli County, Masindi District.

== Background and education ==
He was born in Masindi District, Western Uganda, on 29 February 1940. He attended local elementary and secondary schools. In 1964, at the age of 24 years, he graduated from Paddington Technical College in England, with a Certificate in Science & Technology. He obtained the degree of Bachelor of Science in Agriculture from the California Polytechnic State University in San Luis Obispo, California, in 1968. He returned to Uganda and continued his education at Makerere University, graduating with the Master of Science in Agriculture in 1970. His degree of Doctor of Philosophy in Agriculture was obtained in 1975, from the University of Nairobi.

== Career ==
His long career in public service began in 1972, when he began work with the Uganda Ministry of Agriculture as the Head of Entomology and Nematology Research, serving in that role until 1978. From 1978 until 1981, he worked as the chief agricultural research officer at the Ministry.From 1981 until 1983, he was a senior research fellow at the International Food Policy Research Institute (IFPRI), at that time known as International Service for National Agricultural Research (ISNAR).From 1983 until 1985, he was the senior principal research scientist at the International Centre of Insect Physiology and Ecology (ICIPE), in Nairobi, Kenya. From 1986 until 1990, he was the Director for International Cooperation & Training at ICIPE.

In 1992, he returned to Uganda and was appointed as executive secretary of the Uganda National Council for Science and Technology, serving in that capacity until 2005. From 2005 until 2010, he worked as a consultant to the United Nations and as an adviser on science and the economy to the Government of Uganda. From 2006 to 2010, he also served as the Executive Director of the National Foundation for Research and Development. From 2001 until 2011, he was the Chairperson of the Gulu University Council Appointments Board.

In 2011, he was elected to the parliamentary seat of Buruuli County in Masindi District. In May 2011, he was appointed as State Minister of Agriculture, replacing Henry Bagiire, who was dropped from the Cabinet. On 1 March 2015, he was transferred to the Fisheries portfolio, as State Minister.

== Other considerations ==
Zerubabel Nyiira is married. He belongs to the ruling National Resistance Movement political party. He is of the Anglican faith.

== See also ==
- Cabinet of Uganda
- Parliament of Uganda
- Bunyoro
