= Amir Al-Momenin University of Military Sciences and Technology =

Iranian military college

Amir Al-Momenin University of Military Sciences and Technology is the biggest IRGC staff military college for ground forces officers based in Isfahan. This academy has hosted international armed forces games matches. It was established in 2006.

== History ==
The academy has a paratrooper education program, offers commando training, artillery course, communication, special operations force.

== Administrators ==
Commander Muhammed Karami

Commander Mahdi Sarvar - 2021

General Hamid Sarkhili
