= Raphael Owor =

Ugandan physician, pathologist and academic

Professor Raphael Owor FRCPath
- Born: 7 July 1934 (age 92); Nagongera, Uganda Protectorate
- Citizenship: Uganda
- Education: Makerere University (Bachelor of Medicine and Bachelor of Surgery) (Doctor of Medicine); Royal College of Pathologists (Fellow of the Royal College of Pathologists); Mbarara University (Honorary Doctor of Science)
- Occupations: Physician, Pathologist & Academic
- Years active: 1972 — present
- Known for: Academics
- Title: Former Chancellor of Mbarara University
- Spouse: Mrs. Mary Owor

Raphael Owor is a Ugandan physician, pathologist, academic and medical researcher. He is the immediate past Chancellor of Mbarara University of Science and Technology, serving in that capacity from 2003 until 2007. Prior to that, he served as the Dean of Makerere University School of Medicine, after serving as Pathology Professor and Head of Department at Makerere University.

== Early life and education ==
Born in Nagongera, Tororo District on 7 July 1934 to Tadeo and Magdalene Omiel. For his O-Level and A-Level studies, Owor attended St. Peter's College Tororo, before he was admitted to Makerere University to study human medicine. He graduated with the degree of Bachelor of Medicine and Bachelor of Surgery. He further obtained the degree of Doctor of Medicine in Pathology, also from Makerere. Following his studies at Makerere, he received further training in the United Kingdom, specializing in Human Pathology. He was conferred with the title of Fellow of the Royal College of Pathologists. Later, on 30 January 2010, Mbarara University awarded him an Honorary Doctor of Science degree.

== Career ==
Owor was one of the academicians who remained behind running Makerere University Medical School, when Ugandan dictator Idi Amin expelled Asians in 1972. Owor took over the Department of Pathology and started training new Pathologists under the Master of Medicine in Pathology program. Under his tenure, the Master of Medicine in Hematology program was also introduced. Later, he served as the Dean, Makerere University School of Medicine, before he served as the chancellor of Mbarara University, from 2003 until 2007. He was the first person in Uganda, who is not a head of State, to serve as the chancellor of a public university.

== Other responsibilities ==
In 2003, he became the founding chairman of the African Health Research Forum, a pan-African organisation that aims to promote health research for development in Africa.

== See also ==
- Mbarara University
- Makerere University
- List of university leaders in Uganda
- List of hospitals in Uganda
