= Wilbrod Humphreys Owor =

Ugandan businessman (born 1966)

- Born: 1966 (age 59–60); Tororo District, Uganda
- Education: Makerere University (BComm); Eastern and Southern African Management Institute; Maastricht School of Management (MBA)
- Occupations: Businessman, bank executive, management consultant
- Years active: 1991–present
- Title: Executive director, Uganda Bankers Association

Wilbrod Humphreys Owor, also Wilbrod Humphrey Owor, is a businessman, bank executive, and management consultant in Uganda. He is the executive director of Uganda Bankers Association, the umbrella body of Uganda's 25 commercial banks and one development bank. He was appointed to that position on 8 September 2016. He replaced Emmanuel Kikoni, who had served in that capacity from 2000 until 2016.

== Background and education ==
Owor was born in Tororo District in the Eastern Region of Uganda circa 1966. He studied at St. Peter's College Tororo, before he was admitted to Makerere University. He graduated from Makerere with a Bachelor of Commerce, specializing in finance. His Master of Business Administration, specializing in strategic management, was jointly awarded by the Eastern and Southern African Management Institute and the Maastricht School of Management.

== Career ==
Owor has served in several different capacities, including:

- Managing director and chief executive officer of United Bank for Africa (Uganda)
- Head of retail banking at DFCU Bank
- Head of channels at Barclays Bank of Uganda
- Financial controller at Sara Lee (East Africa)
- Head of budget at Colgate Palmolive (East Africa)

In his role at the Uganda Bankers Association, he has begun consultative discussions with stakeholders to seek a solution to the high cost of credit in Uganda. He is also tasked, together with the executive and management teams of the association, with "presenting industry members' issues to policy makers, making recommendations for policy change and enhancement based on industry trends".

== Other responsibilities ==
Owor is the national chairman of St. Peter's College Old Boys Association.

== See also ==
- List of banks in Uganda
- Banking in Uganda
