= Uganda Military Engineering College =

Military university in Uganda

Uganda Military Engineering College (UMEC)
- Type: Military Engineering University
- Established: 2007
- Vice-Chancellor: Brigadier Dennis Asiimwe
- Location: Lugazi, Uganda; 00°22′12″N 32°54′47″E
- Campus: Urban
- Website: Web Portal
- Location in Uganda

The Uganda Military Engineering College (UMEC), also University of Military Science and Technology (UMST), is a tertiary institution of higher learning, that instructs qualified military officers and technicians in various fields of engineering and science. The university is administered by the Uganda People's Defense Force (UPDF), under the auspices of the Uganda Ministry of Defence.

== Location ==
UMEC is located in the town of Lugazi, in Buikwe District, on a 175 acres (0.71 km^{2}) campus, approximately 44 kilometres (27 mi) east of Kampala, Uganda's capital city, on the Kampala-Jinja Highway. This location lies approximately 4.5 kilometres (3 mi), by road, west of the central business district of Lugazi. The coordinates of the campus of University of Military Science and Technology are:0°22'12.0"N, 32°54'47.0"E (Latitude: 0.3700; Longitude: 32.9130).

== History ==
The university was founded in 2007 and was initially housed at Bombo Military Barracks in Bombo, in Luweero District. An affiliated school of military engineering was later opened and initially housed in Magamaga in Jinja District. Both units were combined with a third unit, originally based in Nakasongola and moved to the premises in Lugazi in January 2011. The real estate in Lugazi was acquired by the UPDF, from the former Lugazi University, which became insolvent and closed on 30 December 2010.

The university graduated its first class of graduates, numbering forty-seven (47), on Friday, 4 February 2011.

== Courses ==
As of July 2016, the following courses were on offer at this institution:

Diplomas

- National Diploma in Civil Engineering (NDCE)
- National Diploma in Water Engineering (NDWE)
- National Diploma in Electrical Engineering (NDEE)
- National Diploma in Mechanical Engineering (NDME)
- National Diploma in Architecture (NDAR)
- National Diploma in Information and Communications Technology (NDICT)
- National Diploma in Telecommunications Engineering (NDTE)
- National Diploma in Refrigeration and Air Conditioning(NDRAC)

Degrees

As of September 2018, the institution offered degree courses.

== See also ==
- National Defence College, Uganda
- UG Military Schools
- Uganda Universities
- Uganda Education
