= Carlien Bou-Chedid =

Ghanaian structural and earthquake engineer

- Citizenship: Ghanaian
- Education: University of Surrey, Imperial College London
- Occupations: Structural and earthquake Engineer

Carlien Bou-Chedid is a Ghanaian structural and earthquake engineering consultant.

== Early life and education ==
Bou-Chedid attended Wesley Girls' Senior High School and Presec, Legon, where she was exposed to influential female role models such as Marie Curie and Helen Keller. She later obtained a BSc (Hons) in Civil Engineering from the University of Surrey, UK, in 1983 and an MSc in Earthquake Engineering and Structural Dynamics from Imperial College London in 1999.

== Career ==
Bou-Chedid began her career at the Architectural Engineering Services Corporation (AESC) in 1985, becoming Ghana's first female structural engineer. She worked at AESC until 1993, engaging in structural design, contractor supervision, and engineering project management. She became the first Ghanaian female to achieve full corporate membership of the GhIE in 1990 and was elected as its first female council member in 1992.

She later served as the GhIE's Director of Education and Training from 1993 to 1998. After a period in private practice, she returned to the GhIE as Executive Secretary from 2003 to 2010, becoming the first woman to hold the position.

She also served on the technical committee on geological disasters of the National Disaster Management Organization (NADMO) in Ghana, where she contributed her expertise to disaster risk mitigation and management initiatives.

== Achievements ==
- Member of the Ghana Earthquake Society.
- Housner Fellow of the Earthquake Engineering Research Institute (EERI)
- Boards of the Electricity Company of Ghana.
- Board member North Ridge Lyceum
- Board of the World Federation of Engineering Organisations.
- President of the Federation of African Engineering Organisations.
- Boad member Federation of African Engineering Organization (FAEO).
