= Sir Samuel Baker Secondary School =

Location
- Gulu, Gulu District; Uganda
- Coordinates: 02°48′46″N 32°19′27″E

Information
- Type: Public Middle School and High School (8–13)
- Motto: "To learn to serve"
- Established: 1953
- Headteacher: Simon Peter Torach
- Faculty: 32 (2011)
- Enrollment: 892 (2011)
- Athletics: Rugby, soccer, track, volleyball, basketball, badminton, ring ball, frisbee, and swimming

Sir Samuel Baker Secondary School was an only-boys boarding middle and high school before it turned to a mixed school as of 2019, located in Gulu, Gulu District in Northern Uganda. The school is named after Sir Samuel White Baker (8 June 1821 – 30 December 1893), the British explorer, officer, naturalist, big game hunter, engineer, writer and abolitionist.

== Location ==
The school campus, measuring 137 hectares (340 acres), is situated off the Kitgum-Gulu Road, approximately 6 kilometres (3.7 mi), by road, northeast of the central business district of Gulu, the largest city in Northern Uganda (pop:152,276 in 2014). The coordinates of the school campus are:2°48'46.0"N, 32°19'27.0"E (Longitude:2.812778; Latitude:32.324167).

== History ==
1953 to 1971

The school was opened in 1953 by the Governor of Uganda Protectorate, one Sir Andrew Cohen. During the next twenty years, the school established itself as one of the best secondary schools in the country, in the areas of academics, sports and achievement of its alumni.

1971 to 2010

When Idi Amin staged his coup d'état in January 1971, the standards at the school began to decline. Teachers and students began to vacate the school as they were ethnically targeted. Academic standards began to decline. There was a brief respite between 1980 and 1985, during the Obote II regime. However the decline was accelerated when the National Resistance Movement captured power in 1986. This led to a 20-year civil war in Northern Uganda, with the school campus at the centre of it, as the Lord's Resistance Army rebels invaded and ransacked the school, making it near-impossible to teach or learn.

After 2010

In the period between the cessation of hostilities between the UPDF and LRA on Ugandan soil in 2006 and 2010, the Government of Belgium in collaboration with the Government of Uganda, renovated the school at a cost of UGX:6 billion (approx. US$2.4 million in 2010 money). The Belgian government contributed 81.7% of the funds (approx. US$1.96 million), while the Uganda government contributed 18.3% (approx. US$440,000). The renovated school was commissioned in April 2011.

== Academics ==
Subjects offered at "O" Level include:

- Biology
- Chemistry
- Christian Religious Education
- Commerce
- Computer Studies
- English Language
- English Literature
- Fine Art
- French Language
- Geography
- History
- Mathematics
- Physics
- Political Education
- Technical Drawing

At "A" Level, subjects offered are categorised into Arts and Sciences. The Arts subjects offered are:

- History
- Economics
- Divinity
- French Language
- Literature in English
- Geography
- Fine Art

The Science subjects offered are:

- Biology
- Chemistry
- Mathematics
- Physics
- Technical Drawing

Subsidiary Mathematics and General Paper are compulsory subjects and students are required to choose one to offer with their three chosen Arts or Sciences subjects.

== Notable alumni ==
- Opiyo Oloya, Ugandan-born educator, author, broadcaster, and journalist, resident in Canada

== See also ==
- Education in Uganda
- List of schools in Uganda
- Gulu District
