= Movit =

Ugandan cosmetics company

Movit Products Ltd
- Company type: Private company
- Industry: Personal care
- Founded: 1997
- Headquarters: Kampala, Uganda
- Key people: Simpson Birungi(CEO and Chairman of the management board), small>
- Products: Cosmetics
- Revenue: $15 million(2014)
- Number of employees: 2,000 (end 2014)
- Website: movit.co.ug

Movit Products Ltd is a Ugandan personal care company based in Kampala, manufacturing personal care products. Its brands include Movit, Radiant, Baby Junior, Skin Guard, Pine and NAN. The company was founded in 1997, by Simpson Birungi as a makeshift workshop in Namasuba, Wakiso District. In 1999 the first Movit product, Herbal Baby Jelly, was put on the market. Over the years, Movit, the company’s flagship name, has grown into one of Uganda’s top cosmetics brands with distribution links in both East Africa and the COMESA regions.
