= Opiyo Oloya =

Ugandan-Canadian educator and author

- Born: 1958 (age 67–68); Pamin-Yai, Amuru District, Uganda
- Citizenship: Uganda
- Education: Queen's University (Bachelor of Arts in Political Science); University of Ottawa (Master of Education); York University (Doctor of Philosophy)
- Occupation: Educator
- Years active: 1982 — present
- Known for: Authoring

Opiyo Oloya is a Ugandan-born educator and author, living in Canada, currently Western University's Associate Vice President of Equity, Diversity and Inclusion. He wrote Child to Soldier published by the University of Toronto Press in 2013. The book deals with the experience of child soldiers recruited to the army of Joseph Kony.

== Early life and education ==
Oloya was born in the village of Pamin-Yai, in modern-day Amuru District, Northern Region, Uganda, in 1957. At the time of his birth, Amuru District was part of neighboring Gulu District. After attending local primarily schools, he was admitted to Sir Samuel Baker Secondary School for part of his O-Level studies (S1 to S3), from 1973 until 1976. He transferred to St. Peter's College Tororo, completing both his O-Level and A-Level education there, from 1976 until 1979. In 1979 he was admitted to Makerere University to pursue a degree in political science. While at Makerere, he became active in campus politics and was elected president of Makerere University Students' Guild. His views clashed with those of the ruling Obote II regime at the time.

In 1981, he fled to neighboring Kenya, before finishing his undergraduate studies. He filed for refugee status in Kenya and was accepted by Canada, where he relocated in 1981. He continued his studies at Queen's University, graduating with the degree of Bachelor of Arts in Political Science in 1986. He went on to attain the degree of Master of Education from the University of Ottawa in 1988. In June 2010, he successfully defended his thesis for the degree of Doctor of Philosophy at York University.

== Career ==
Oloya is the author of several books, including Child to Soldier (University of Toronto Press, 2013) and Black Hawks rising: the story of AMISOM’s successful war against Somali insurgents, 2007-2014. Opiyo Oloya's chosen main career is in education.

== See also ==
- Amuru District
- Gulu
- Betty Bigombe
- Acholi sub-region
