= Kyambogo University =

Public university in Uganda

Kyambogo University (KYU)
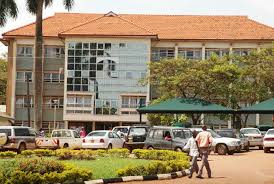
- Motto: Knowledge and Skills for Service
- Type: Public
- Established: 2003; 23 years ago
- Chancellor: John Ssebuwufu
- Vice-Chancellor: Elly Katunguka
- Administrative staff: 488
- Students: 33,000+ (2021)
- Location: Kyambogo Road, Kampala, Uganda; 00°21′00″N 32°37′48″E
- Campus: Urban
- Website: Homepage
- Location in Kampala

Kyambogo University (KYU) is a public university in Uganda. It is one of the largest universities in Uganda, and is among the eight public universities and degree-awarding institutions in the country. Its motto is "Knowledge and Skills for Service."

== History ==
Kyambogo University was established in 2003 by the Universities and Other Tertiary Institutions Act 2001 by merging Uganda Polytechnic Kyambogo (UPK), the Institute of Teacher Education, Kyambogo (ITEK), and the Uganda National Institute of Special Education (UNISE).

=== Uganda Polytechnic Kyambogo ===
In 1928, the trade and technical courses at Makerere College (now Makerere University) were split off into the new Kampala Technical School. The school moved to Nakawa and became the Kampala Technical Institute. In 1958, the school was moved to Kyambogo, renamed Uganda Technical College and was finally renamed Uganda Polytechnic, Kyambogo.

=== Institute of Teacher Education, Kyambogo ===
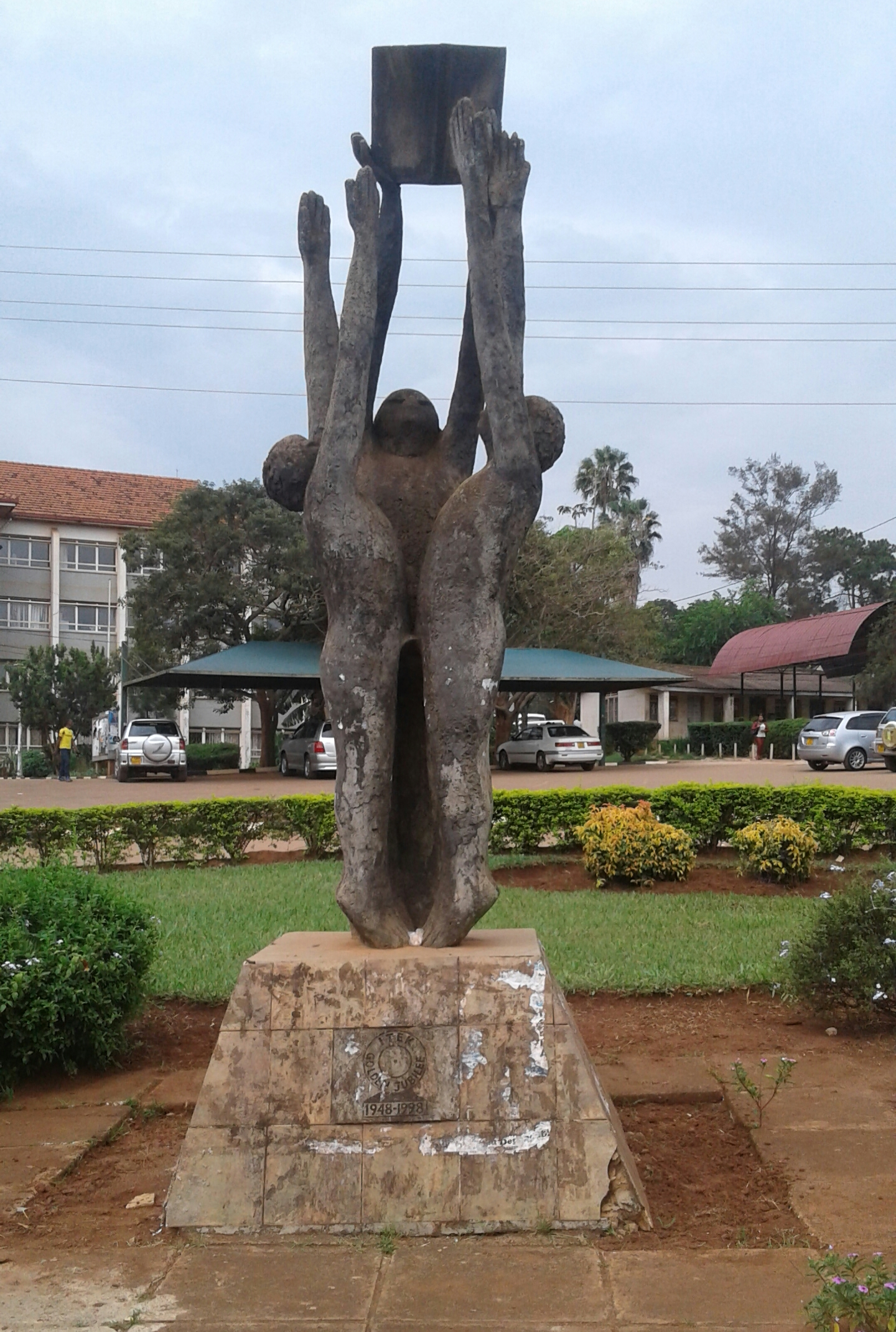
Institute of Teacher Education Kyambogo

ITEK started as a government teacher training college in 1948 at Nyakasura, Kabarole District. In 1954, it transferred to Kyambogo Hill as a national teachers’ college and later became ITEK by statute of parliament in 1989.

=== Uganda National Institute of Special Education ===
UNISE was affiliated to the Department of Special Education at the faculty of education of Makerere University, becoming an autonomous institution by Act of Parliament in 1998.

== Campus ==
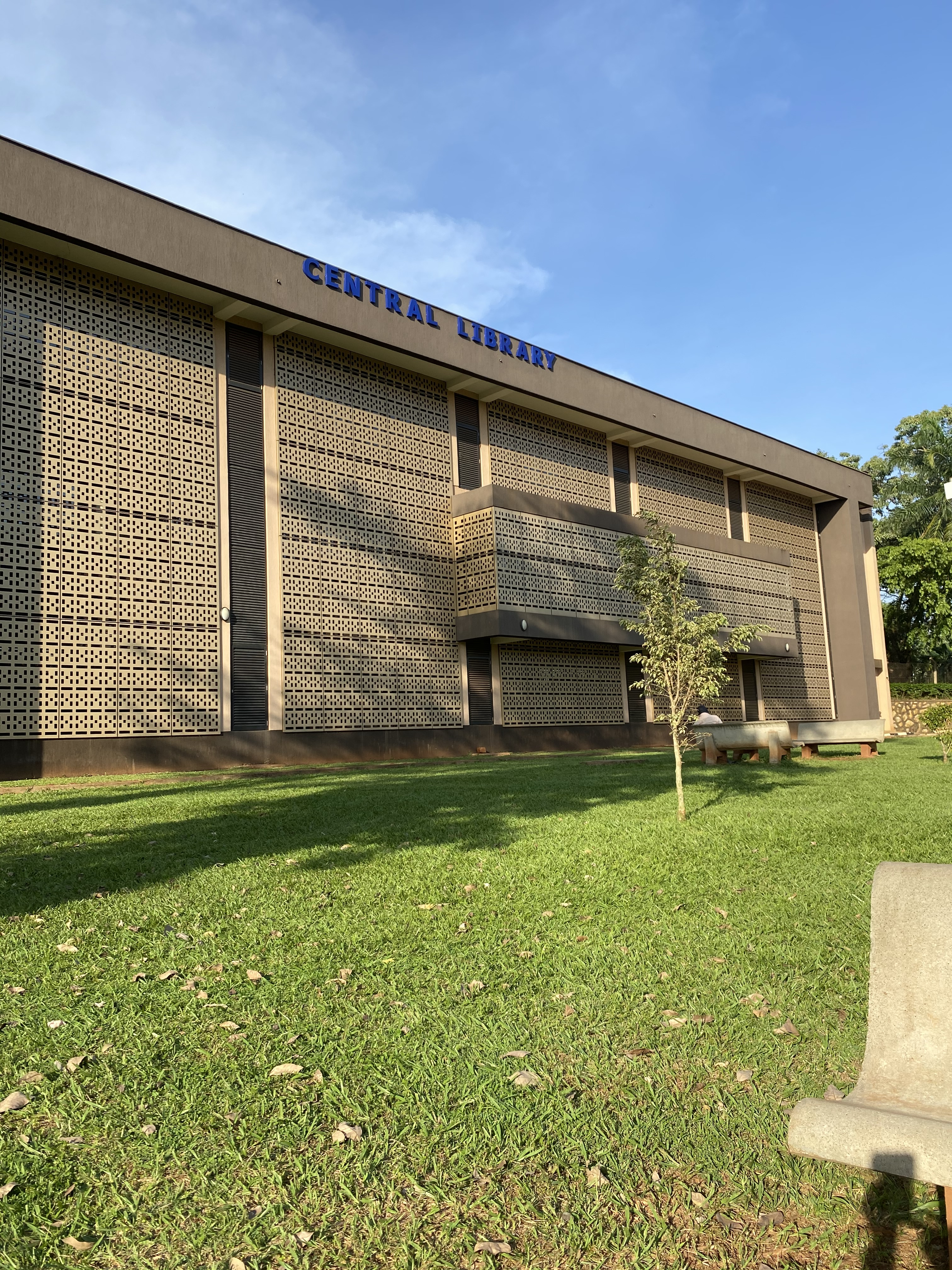
Kyambogo University Central Library

The university campus is located on Kyambogo Hill, approximately 8 kilometres (5 mi), by road, east of the central business district of Kampala, the capital city of Uganda. The geographical coordinates of the university campus are: 0°21'00.0"N, 32°37'48.0"E (Latitude:0.350000; Longitude:32.630000).

== Organization and administration ==
Kyambogo University now has six faculties, six schools and one institute:

- Faculty of Engineering
- Faculty of Science
- Faculty of Agriculture
- Faculty of Special Needs & Rehabilitation
- Faculty of Arts and Humanities
- Faculty of Social Sciences
- School of Built Environment
- School of Vocational Studies
- School of Computing and Information Science
- School of Education
- School of Art and Industrial Design
- School of Management and Entrepreneurship
- Institute of Distance Education, E-Learning and Learning Centres.

== Notable alumni ==
=== Royals ===
- William Gabula, 4th Kyabazinga of Busoga and Paramount Chief of Gabula

=== Politics ===
- Henry Bagiire, Minister of State for Agriculture, 2011-2016
- Charles Bakkabulindi, MP, Minister of State for Sports since 2005
- Rukiya Chekamondo, Minister of State for Privatisation, 2006-2011
- Lukia Isanga Nakadama, Minister of State for Gender and Culture since 2006
- Daniel Kidega, 4th Speaker of the East African Legislative Assembly since 2014
- Brenda Nabukenya, Member of parliament seat for Luwero district in between 2011 and 2016, Luwero district Women Member of Parliament 2021-

=== Academics ===
- Hannington Sengendo, Vice Chancellor of Nkumba University since 2013.
- Arthur Sserwanga, Vice Chancellor of Muteesa I Royal University 2014 to 2017.

=== Business ===
- Anatoli Kamugisha, founder and managing director of Akright Projects
- Richard Musani, marketing manager, Movit Products Limited

=== Entertainment ===
- Joanita Kawalya, musician and member of the Afrigo Band
- Rachael Magoola, musician and member of the Afrigo Band
- Irene Ntale, musician
- Milka Irene, actress and politician
- Rema Namakula, recording artist and entertainer

=== Sports ===
- Stella Chesang, athlete and 2015 World Mountain Running Champion
- Henry Malinga, basketball player
- Susan Muwonge, rally driver and teacher
- Brian Umony, footballer with KCCA FC and the Uganda national football team, known as the Uganda Cranes.

=== Others ===
- Diana Nkesiga, Vicar of All Saints' Cathedral, Nakasero since 2007
- Julius Ocwinyo, poet and novelist
- Kazawadi Papias Dedeki, Engineer and president of Federation of Africa Engineering Organizations
- Stephen Buay Rolnyang, South Sudanese rebel leader and former SSPDF general

== Notable faculty ==
- John Ssebuwufu, Chancellor since 2014
- Elly Katunguka, Vice Chancellor since 2014
- Senteza Kajubi, Principal of the Kyambogo Institute of Higher Education, 1986-1990
- Venansius Baryamureeba, Assistant Lecturer, 1995-1996
- Edward Rugumayo, Lecturer, 1968-1969
- Sam Joseph Ntiro
- Elvania Namukwaya Zirimu

== See also ==
- List of universities in Uganda
- List of university leaders in Uganda
