= John Ssebuwufu =

- Born: 1947 (age 78–79); Uganda
- Citizenship: Uganda
- Education: Makerere University (BSc in Chemistry) (MSc in Chemistry); Queen's University Belfast (PhD in Chemistry) (Postdoctoral Fellowship in Chemistry)
- Occupations: Chemist, Educator and Administrator
- Years active: 1979 — present
- Known for: Academic administration

John Pancras Mukasa Lubowa Ssebuwufu, commonly known as John Ssebuwufu is a Ugandan chemist, academic and administrator. He is a former chancellor of Kyambogo University, Uganda's second-largest public university serving between 2014-2022 having served for 2 terms. He was installed as chancellor on 19 February 2014, replacing Eric Tiyo Adriko, who had completed his two term tenure. The correct spelling of his last name is Ssebuwufu. However the literature contains many instances where the name is spelled with a single "s".

== Background ==
He was born in Uganda's Central Region in 1947.

== Education ==
Ssebuwufu attended Namilyango College for his middle and high school education in the 1960s. He studied at Makerere University, for his Bachelor of Science and Master of Science degrees, both in Chemistry. In 1974, he won a scholarship to study for a Doctor of Philosophy at Queen's University Belfast in Northern Ireland, from which he graduated in 1977. Ssebuwufu spent another two years at Queen's University on a postdoctoral fellowship also in chemistry.

== Work experience ==
On returning to Uganda in 1979, Ssebuwufu was appointed as lecturer in the Department of Chemistry at Makerere University. He continued in that position until 1985, when he was promoted to senior lecturer. In 1987, he became the head of the Chemistry Department at the university.

In 1990, he was elevated to the rank of professor and was appointed principal of the Institute of Teacher Education; now part of Kyambogo University. He served in that capacity until 1993 when he was appointed vice chancellor of Makerere University, Uganda's oldest and largest public university. He served as vice chancellor until the expiration of his tenure in 2004. In February 2014, the President of Uganda appointed him chancellor of Kyambogo University.

== Other responsibilities ==
In addition to his responsibilities at Kyambogo University, Ssebuwufu is the current Vice Chancellor of the University of Kisubi (UniK) which was formerly known as Kisubi Brothers University College (KBUC), a constituent college of Uganda Martyrs University to which he had also served as the Principal. In 2013, he was appointed as the chairperson of the UbuntuNet Alliance, the regional research and education network for Eastern and Southern Africa. In the past, he has served as the director of research programs at the Association of African Universities (AAU) in Ghana.

Ssebuwufu is a member of the World Bank Millennium Science Initiative and is one of the technical experts for Uganda. He serves as the chairman of the board of directors for following Ugandan companies and businesses:

- Citibank Uganda - A subsidiary of Citigroup of New York City
- Uganda Management Institute (UMI)
- National Environment Management Authority of Uganda (NEMA)
- National Council for Science and Technology

== See also ==
- Education in Uganda
- Ugandan university leaders
- List of universities in Uganda

== Succession table as vice chancellor of Makerere University ==
Preceded by Senteza Kajubi; 1990-1993	Vice chancellor of Makerere University; 1993-2004	Succeeded by Livingstone Luboobi; 2004-2009

== Succession table as chancellor of Kyambogo University ==
Preceded by Eric Tiyo Adriko; 2005-2014	Chancellor of Kyambogo University; 2014-2022	Succeeded by Prof. John Yakobo Okedi
