= Lilian Ruteraho =

Ugandan administrator and politician

- Born: 28 December 1978 (age 47); Kasana subcounty, Sheema District
- Citizenship: Ugandan
- Education: Masters in Education
- Occupations: Teacher, politician and administrator
- Known for: RDC Kagadi District
- Political party: National Resistance Movement (NRM)
- Board member of: Lake Mburo Secondary School

Lilian Ruteraho (born 28 December 1978) is a Ugandan teacher, politician and administrator. She has also worked as the Resident District Commissioner of districts in Uganda including Kagadi, Rubanda and Kyegegwa.

She is now the newly elected Woman Member of Parliament for Isingiro District in the 12th Parliament of Uganda following the 2026 general elections under the National Resistance Movement (NRM) party.

== Education and background ==
Lilian Ruteraho was born on 28 December 1978 to the late Samson Ruteraho in Kigaba village, Kasana subcounty, Sheema District.

She attended Kasana Primary School. She joined Kitagata Secondary School and Standard High School Zana for her ordinary level. She joined Lake Mburo Secondary School for her advanced level, where she currently serves as a school board member.

Ruteraho then joined National Teacher's College, Kakoba, where she studied education in History and Christian Religious Education. Later, she joined Makerere University, where she got a degree, and then joined Bishop Stuart University for a master's degree.

== Career ==
Ruteraho started teaching at Lake Mburo Secondary School after graduating from National Teachers' College. She became the local chairperson of Isingiro district and woman chairperson of National Resistance Movement (NRM).

She later contested to be a Member of Parliament from Isingiro District, but she lost.

In 2018, Ruteraho was appointed as the Resident District Commissioner of Kagadi District. She was transferred to Rubanda District, Kyegegwa District and then back to Kagadi District.

In the NRM party primaries ahead of the 2026 elections, she was declared the party's flag bearer for the Isingiro District Woman MP seat after a tense and delayed vote tallying process. Ruteraho topped the results with a substantial margin over several contenders, including the incumbent MP Clare Mugumya.

During the general elections, Ruteraho won, polling 135,467 votes compared to her nearest challenger, Justine Ayebazibwe, who received 43,088 votes.

== See also ==
- List of members of the twelfth Parliament of Uganda
- Denis Obua (politician)
- Parliament of Uganda
- John Babiiha
- Ruth Achieng
- David Bahati
- Bruce Baraba Kabaasa
