= Lango College =

Ugandan, residential, boys secondary school

Coordinates: 2°16′02″N 32°53′24″E

- Lira, Lira District; Uganda

Information
- Type: Public Secondary School
- Headmaster: Samuel Okino
- Enrollment: 300 (2018)

Lango College is government aided, both "O" and "A" level boarding boys' secondary school located in the city of Lira, Uganda. It is a government school, designed to accommodate over 1,000 but whose enrollment was only about 300 students in 2018.

== Location ==
The school is in Adyel Division, Lira City, Lira District, Lango sub-region, in the Northern Region of Uganda, approximately 2.5 kilometres (2 mi), north of the central business district, along the Lira–Gulu Highway. The geographical coordinates of the school campus are 2°16'02.0"N, 32°53'24.0"E (Latitude:2.267222; Longitude:32.890000).

== Overview ==
Lango College was a strong school by reputation and academic performance. Student enrollment totaled in excess of 1,000. However the school fell on hard times. It declined in physical appearance of school buildings, academic performance and student enrollment. In 2018, only about 300 students were enrolled.

The factors that led to the school's decline are varied, but include outright theft by school administrators, indiscipline and riots by students, and infighting by academic staff.

== Rehabilitation ==
In January 2018, old students of the college, including the engineer Dr. Charles Wana Etyem, the former chairman of Makerere University Council, met at the school to devise ways to revive the declining standards. One of the pathways agreed upon was the restoration of the school's board of directors. Robinson Ogwal was elected to represent the alumni association on the board.

== Prominent alumni ==
Prominent alumni include Denis Hamson Obua, the minister of state for sports, 2019-2022 and MP for Ajuri County since 2011. He serves as the Government Chief Whip, since 2022.
