= Rebecca Amuge Otengo =

Ugandan politician (born 1966)

- Born: 26 April 1966 (age 60); Uganda
- Citizenship: Uganda
- Education: Ndejje University (Bachelor of Arts) (Master of Science); Law Development Centre (Certificate in Administrative Law); Makerere University Business School (Diploma in Business Studies)
- Occupation: Politician
- Years active: 1991 – present
- Title: Member of Parliament; Woman Representative for Alebtong District

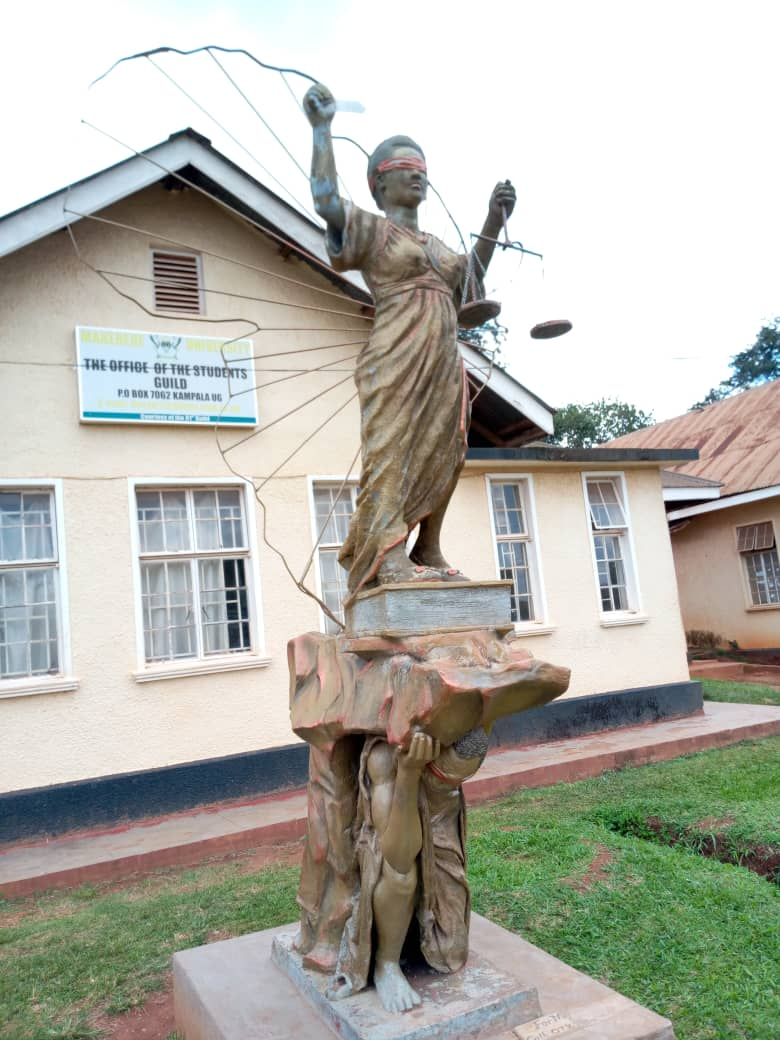
Struggle for Justice in Africa Monument sponsored by H.E Otengo Rebecca Amuge

Rebecca Amuge Otengo is a Ugandan politician. In 2017, she was appointed Uganda's Ambassador to Ethiopia and Djibouti with residence in Addis Ababa. This position also makes her Uganda's Permanent Representative to the African Union (AU), Intergovernmental Authority on Development (IGAD) as well as UNECA She is the former State Minister for Northern Uganda in the Cabinet of Uganda. She was appointed to that position on 27 May 2011. Rebecca Amuge was a Member of Parliament as Alebtong District Women's Representative and currently she is Uganda’s ambassador to Ethiopia.

== Background and education ==
Rebecca Amuge was born on 26 April 1966 in the Lango sub-region, in Northern Uganda. She attended St. Katherine Girls' Secondary School for her O-Level studies, before transferring to Dr. Obote College in Lira, for her A-Level education. In 1990, she obtained the Diploma in Business Studies from what was known as the Uganda College of Commerce, but is now known as Makerere University Business School. In 2008, she obtained the degree of Bachelor of Arts in Human Resource Management from Makerere University, Uganda's oldest public university. That same year she was awarded the Certificate in Administrative Law by the Law Development Centre. In 2010 Makerere University awarded her the degree of Master of Science in Human Resources Management.

== Career ==
Amuge Otengo began her career in 1991 as the Personnel Manager/Trainer at Sun-Set Group, serving in that capacity until 1993. She then worked as a personnel instructor at the Church of Uganda provincial project in Jinja, from 1993 until 1995. Between 1996 and 2001 she was the Project Coordinator at Church of Uganda, Lango Diocese. From 2002 until 2006, she served as the Vice Chairperson of Lango District Local Government. In 2006, she was elected to Parliament to represent women in Lira District, serving from 2006 until 2011. In 2011 she contested for the parliamentary seat of Women's Representative for newly created Alebtong District and was elected. In May 2011, she was appointed Minister of State for Northern Uganda; she replaced David Wakinona, who was appointed State Minister for Trade and Antiquities.

== Other considerations ==
Rebecca Amuge Otengo is a married mother. She belongs to the National Resistance Movement political party.

== See also ==
- Cabinet of Uganda
- Parliament of Uganda
- Northern Uganda
