= Andrew Ojulong =

Ugandan information professional, academic, and librarian

Andrew Ojulong Dr
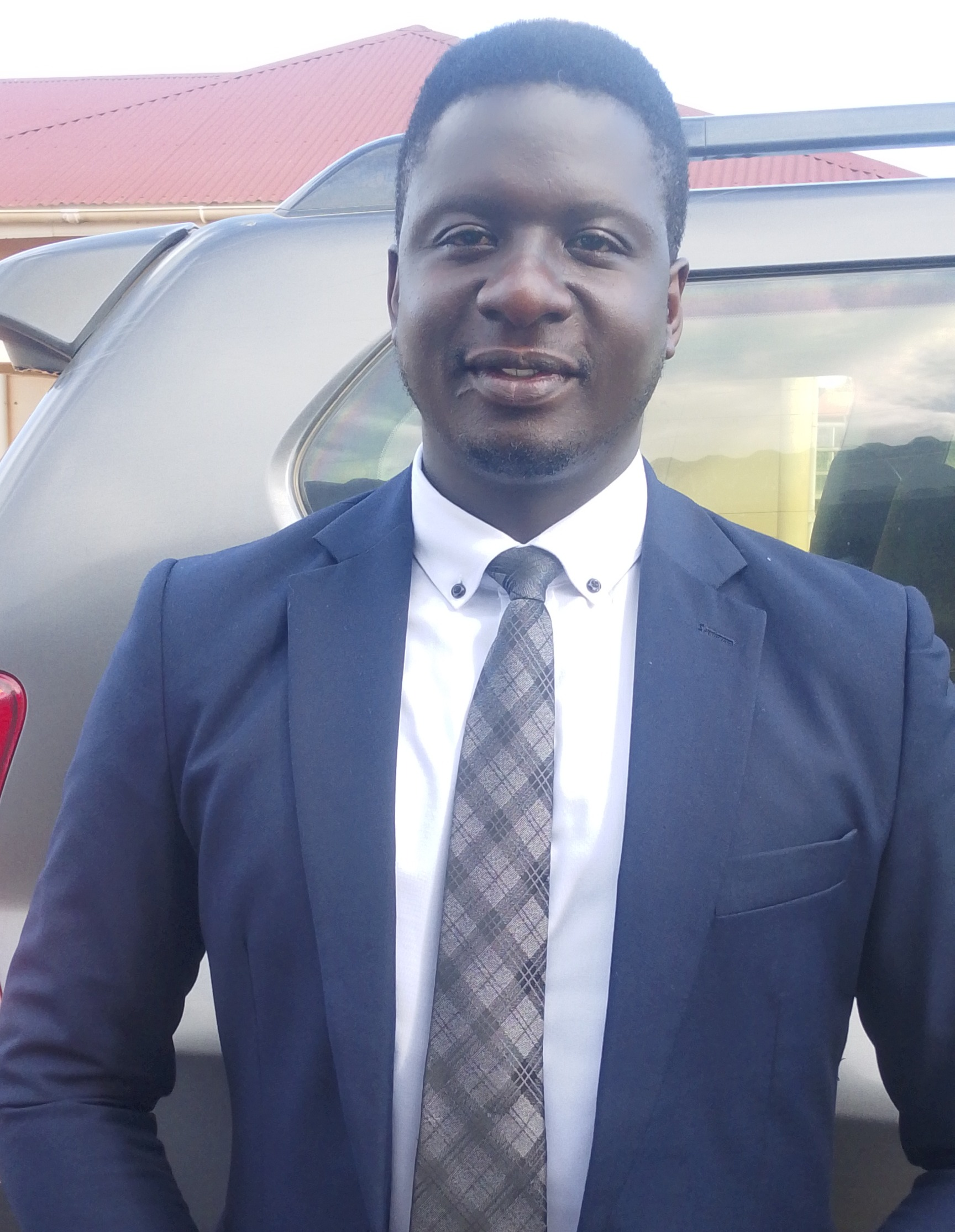
- Born: 7 July 1983 (age 43); Uganda
- Citizenship: Uganda
- Education: PhD in Information Science
- Alma mater: Uganda Christian University (BLIS); Makerere University (MSc. Inf. Sc, PhD.Info. Sc)
- Occupations: Academic administrator, information scientist, librarian administrator and researcher
- Years active: 1999–present
- Organization(s): Consortium of Uganda University Libraries (CUUL), Lira University and African Views Organization
- Notable work: Executive Chairperson-CUUL Acting Vice Chancellor-Lira University Head Librarian - Lira University
- Title: Executive chairperson
- Spouse: Alison Atai
- Parents: George William Ojulong (father); Janet Akwii (mother)
- Awards: Experience of 2021 Grant Awardee

Andrew Ojulong (born 7 July 1983) is a Ugandan academic administrator, information scientist, librarian, administrator and researcher. He is the executive chairperson in the leadership of Consortium of Uganda University Libraries.

== Early life and education ==
His academic life started from Ngora Boys' Primary School in Ngora District, Eastern Uganda where he sat for his Primary Leaving Examination. Later, he joined Royal Oasis College in Kampala District (by then) for his Uganda Certificate of Education and proceeded to Kampala Citizen College for his Uganda Advanced Certificate of Education.

He joined Uganda Christian University for his Bachelor of Library and Information Science. He then joined Makerere University for both Master of Science in Information Science and Philosophy of Information Science which he completed on 26 February 2026.

== Career ==
He participated in the African Development Bank-Higher Education Science and Technology (ADB-HEST) Project, funded by the African Development Bank (AfDB) chapter 2017-2019.

From 2017-2021, he was involved in the Erasmus plus African Higher Education leadership in Advancing Inclusive Innovation for Development (AHEAD) Innovations project, which aimed to strengthen inclusive innovation across African higher education. The initiative focused on assessing national innovation systems in Kenya, Tanzania and Uganda, building innovation capacity at partner universities, creating open educational resources, running training workshops and establishing virtual knowledge hubs. It also promoted collaboration among stakeholders.

He is currently the head librarian of Lira University. He has been acting vice chancellor of the same university from 2026 to date.

He is also the current executive chairman of the Consortium of Uganda University Libraries (CUUL).

During the 2.5 billion shillings Multi-morbidity Care in Africa (M-CARE) project launch, Ojulong said that non-communicable diseases such as diabetes, high blood pressure (hypertension) and cardiovascular diseases are not rare in Northern Uganda. He further noted that by implementing interventions in selected primary health facilities across some selected districts in the region like Kole, Lira, Oyam and Lira City will allow the project to bring its services closer to the people.

On 23 April 2026 when Lira University was hosting the 2nd Annual Research Dissemination conference. He said that research dissemination conference offers crucial benefits for scholars, practitioners and policymakers by alleviating the commissioning of findings, accelerating the impact of research and fostering the professional growth that give real-time feedback that can enable researchers to down overture work before formal publication.

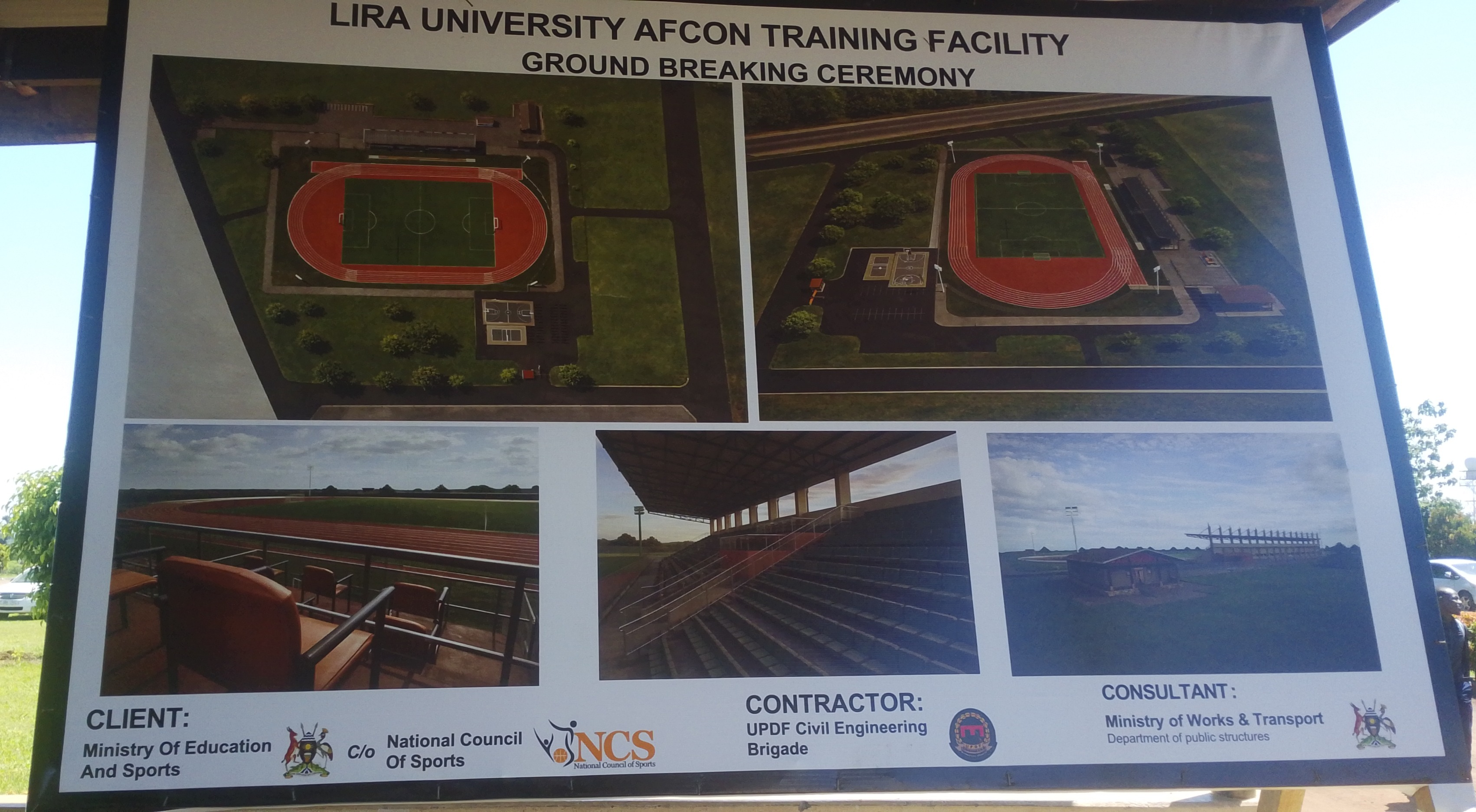
Footprint of Lira Univsity Training Ground

While acting as the vice chancellor of Lira university during the ground breaking ceremony of Shs13.2 billion Africa Cup of Nation (AFCON) training ground construction at the university, he thanked Yoweri Museveni (president of Uganda) and his government for localized developmental activities.

During the discussion about research gaps that expose some universities as glorified high schools in November 2025, Ojulong brought up concerns that students are enrolling at a low rate for the Library and Information Science course. He said that this is attributed to public criticism, limited knowledge and Informstion and Communication Technology illiteracy.

During the Jonard Asiimwe Akiiki's university visit on the 7th November, 2026, Ojulong while acting as the VC for the second time informed public that university's second infrastructure development project has been acknowledged which includes construction of multipurpose library complex, university teaching hospital's expansion, development of medical laboratory, ICT and research equipment by Public Investment Program (PIP)

== Research works ==
Ojulong has participated in widely published research works. Some of his works include:

- 2017: Analysis of the national innovation system in Uganda as part of the consortium of the ERASMUS+ project “African Higher Education Leadership in Advancing Inclusive Innovation for Development / AHEAD” (585919-EPP-1-2017-1-RO-EPPKA2-CBHE-JP), coordinated by University of Medicine, Pharmacy, Sciences and Technology of Tîrgu Mures, Romania.
- 2018: The Utilization of EBooks in Medical Sciences' Graduate Programmes in Makerere University: The study sought to investigate the accessibility, environment, perceptions and use of eBooks. While academic libraries spent huge amounts on subscriptions, there were limited studies on usage and therefore not enough information on value for money on e-resources subscription.
- 2018: Young people of Uganda and the survival of African ancient rock art: discrepancy between thought and action. A combination of forces and circumstances now threatens the ancient rock art of Uganda.
- 2018: Lira University: Institutional Innovation and Research Capacity Self-Assessment Report. Lira University Institutional Innovation and Research Capacity Self-Assessment is part of the work package for the implementation of Erasmus+ Programme Capacity Building in Higher Education Project of the European Union 2017-2020 Work Package 1.4.
- 2022: Perspective Review of the Evolution and Application of Information Science: The purpose of this paper is to critically review literature pertaining to the evolution and application of Information Science so as to understand varied perspectives and attempt to address the following questions: what influenced the origin of Information Science; what was predicted to happen in the modern times; And how has the evolution and application of Information Science has impacted on the information services sector in the 21st century. Using the desk review approach to understand the subject matter based on published online literature from 1990 onwards.
- 2022: The implications of COVID 19 on the publication of library and information science literature in Africa: A bibliometric study. The study employed desk review alongside citation and bibliographic analysis to carry out inquiry into the publications in Library and Information Science as a case covering the period 2O17 to 2O2O and looking at the top TO publishing countries in Africa.
- 2025: The Role of RENU and NITA-U in Providing Infrastructure and Online Access in Ugandan Higher Education. This study investigates the role of national ICT agencies in facilitating access to digital academic content in Ugandan higher education. Specifically, it examines the impact of the Research and Education Network for Uganda (RENU) and the National Information Technology Authority-Uganda (NITA-U) on two contrasting institutions, Makerere University (public) and Kampala International University (private). Using a qualitative case study design, data was collected through semi-structured interviews with 30 participants, including ICT administrators, academic staff, and students.

== See also ==
- Daniel Heinsius
- Yoweri Museveni
- Netiwit Chotiphatphaisal
