= Kamtech Logistics Uganda Limited =

Ugandan energy company

Coordinates: 02°12′26″N 32°55′23″E

- Company type: Private
- Industry: Ethanol industry
- Founded: 20 February 2014
- Headquarters: Lira, Uganda
- Products: Ethanol, animal feed, chicken feed, acetaldehyde
- Number of employees: 80 (2016)

Kamtech Logistics Uganda Limited (KLUL), is an ethanol manufacturing company in Uganda.

== Location ==
The headquarters of the company and the company's factory are located in Baropuu Village, Angweta Angwet Parish, Adekokwok sub-county, Lira District, Lango sub-region, in the Northern Region of Uganda. This is approximately 8 kilometres (5 mi) southeast of the central business district of Lira Town, the nearest large town and location of the district headquarters.

== History ==
The company's plant opened on 20 February 2014. The company was established by investors from Lebanon, Saudi Arabia and Uganda. The ethanol plant was built at a cost of US$1.8 million.

== Overview ==
In 2010, Uganda received US$30 million (UShs100.9 billion) from the World Bank, under the East Africa Agricultural Productivity Project (EAAPP), to increase cassava productivity and yields in the country. According to the National Agricultural Research Organisation (NARO), since EAAPP was implemented, cassava production has increased from 6 million tonnes annually to 11.3 million tonnes. Thirty six percent of the country's cassava is grown in the Northern Region.

The new factory buys cassava from farmers and processes the crop into ethanol. The high yields of the crop assures the factory adequate supply of raw material. Due to increased demand, the price is attractive and rising. Some of the associated bio-products include animal feed, chicken feed and acetaldehyde, which is used in making acetic acid. The by-products of acetic acid are used in printing processes, wood furniture and the treatment of bacterial infections. The factory processes 15 tonnes of cassava daily to produce 4,000 litres (880 imp gal; 1,057 US gal) per day on average. That is about 10 per cent of what Uganda imports.

== Other considerations ==
Ethanol can be extracted from cassava, maize and sorghum. However, maize is too expensive and sorghum is in short supply.

== See also ==
- Economy of Uganda
- Northern Region, Uganda
