= Amolatar =

Ugandan town

- Location in Uganda
- Coordinates: 01°39′06″N 32°49′30″E
- Country: Uganda
- Region: Northern Region
- Sub-region: Lango sub-region
- District: Amolatar District
- Elevation: 3,425 ft (1,044 m)

Population (2020 Estimate)
  - Total: 12,900

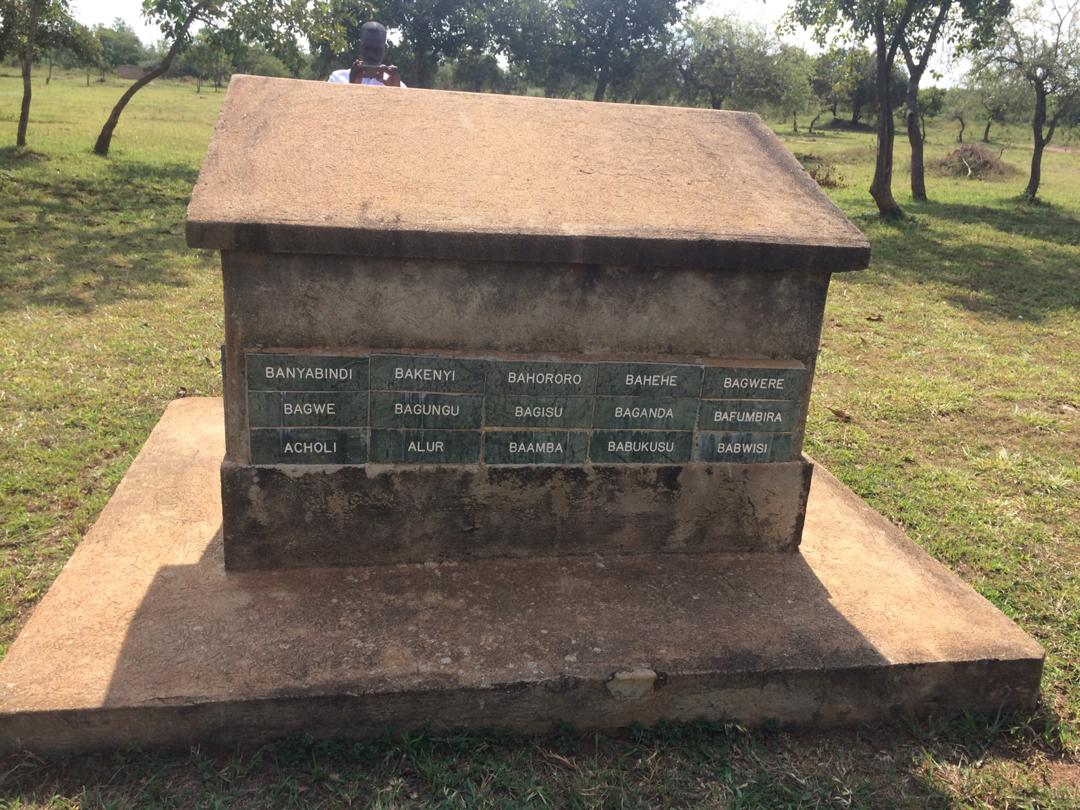
Amolatar Uganda Tribe Monument

Amolatar is a town in Northern Uganda. It is the main municipal, administrative and commercial centre of Amolatar District. The district is named after the town.

== Location ==
Amolatar is located in Kioga County, approximately 115 kilometres (71 mi), by road, south of the city of Lira, the largest city in the sub-region. This location lies 391 kilometres (243 mi), by road, north of Kampala, the capital of Uganda and the largest city in that country. The coordinates of the town are:01 38 06N, 32 49 30E (Latitude:1.6350; Longitude:32.8250).

== Population ==
The 2002 national census estimated the town's population at about 11,420. In 2010, the Uganda Bureau of Statistics (UBOS), estimated the population of the town at 14,300. In 2011, UBOS estimated the mid-year population of Amolatar at 14,800.

In 2015, UBOS estimated the population of the town at 11,400. In 2020, the population agency estimated the population of Amolatar Town Council at 12,900 inhabitants; of whom 6,400 (49.6 percent) were females and 6,500 (50.4 percent) were males. UBOS calculated that the population of the town, increased at an average rate of 2.6 percent annually, between 2015 and 2020.

Historical population
Year	Pop.	±%
2002	11,420	—
2010	14,300	+25.2%
2011	14,800	+3.5%
2015	11,400	−23.0%
2020	12,900	+13.2%

== Points of interest ==
The following points of interest lie within the town limits or close to the edges of the town: (a) the headquarters of Amolatar District Administration (b) the offices of Amolatar Town Council (c) the Amolatar Monument which marks the geographic centre of Uganda and (d) Amolatar Health Centre IV, administered by the Uganda Ministry of Health.

== See also ==
- Lango sub-region
- Langi
- List of cities and towns in Uganda
