= Denis Obua (politician) =

Ugandan politician

Honourable Denis Hamson Obua
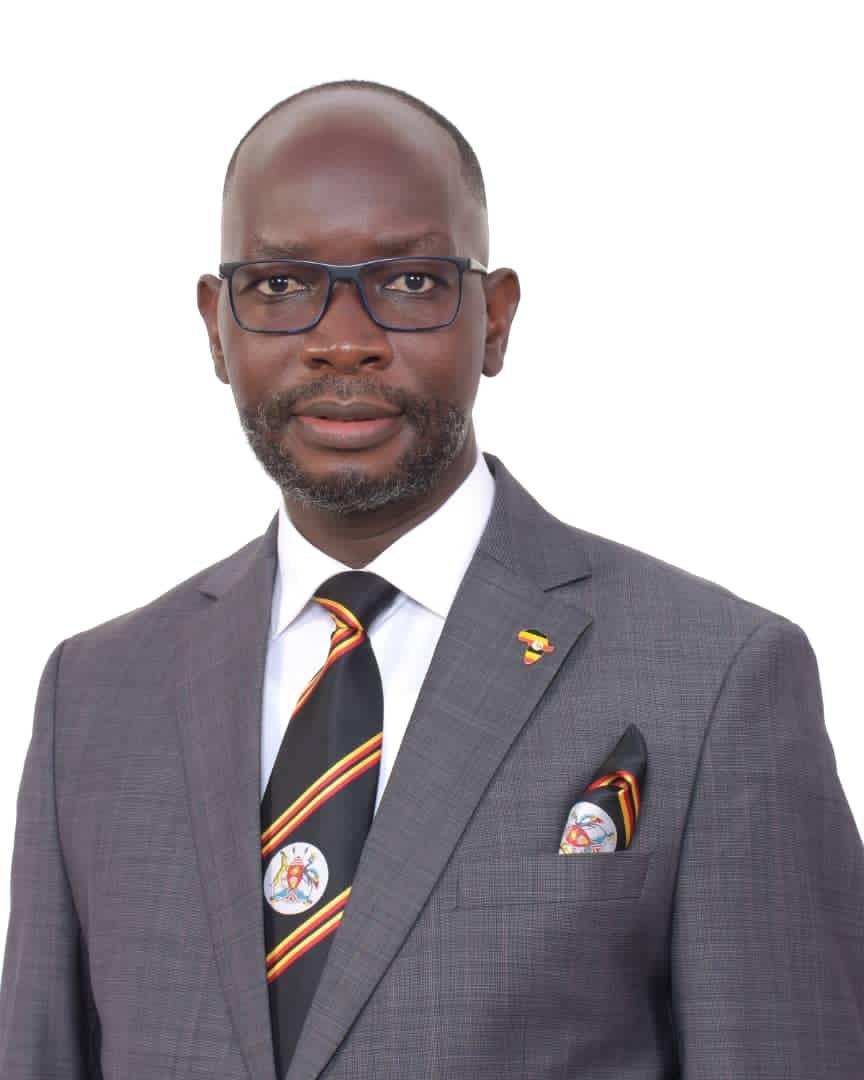
- Hon. Denis Hamson Obua
- Born: 6 February 1980 (age 46); Uganda
- Education: Law Development Centre (Diploma in Law) (Certificate in Administrative Law); Uganda Christian University (Bachelor of Arts in Social Work and Social Administration); Uganda Management Institute (Master of Public Administration)
- Occupation: Politician
- Years active: since 2000
- Title: Government Chief Whip

Denis Hamson Obua (born 6 February 1970) is a Ugandan politician, who serves as the Government Chief Whip in the Parliament of Uganda, a position he was appointed to on 21 July 2022. The office was officially handed over to him on 16 August 2022. He previously served as Minister of State for Sports, in the Cabinet of Uganda, effective 14 December 2019. He also concurrently serves as the incumbent Member of Parliament representing Ajuri County, Alebtong District in the 11th Parliament (2021 to 2026), a seat he also held in the 10th Parliament (2016 to 2021).

He lost his Ajuri County parliamentary seat during the January 2026 elections, which was took over by Uganda People’s Congress (UPC) candidate Fred Jalameso, who represents the people of Ajiri County in the 12th parliament (2026-2031).

== Early life and education ==
Obua was born in Alebtong District on 6 February 1980. He attended Inomo Primary School before transferring to Lango College, in Lira City, where he completed both his O-Level and A-Level education, and obtained his Uganda Certificate of Education in 1997 and a Uganda Advanced Certificate of Education in 1999.

He has a Diploma in Law and a Certificate in Administrative Law, both obtained from the Law Development Centre, in Kampala, Uganda's capital city. His Bachelor of Arts in Social Work and Social Administration was obtained from Uganda Christian University, in Mukono. His Master of Public Administration degree was awarded by Uganda Management Institute in 2016.

== Career ==
From 2000 until 2003, Obua was employed as a contracts clerk at British American Tobacco. For the next two years, he served as a legal assistant at Atim and Company Advocates. He was then hired as a Senior Clerical Officer, responsible for legal duties, in the Office of the Vice President of Uganda, serving in that capacity from 2005 until 2006.

In 2006, he was elected to the 8th Parliament (2006–2011), Youth Member of Parliament representing Northern Uganda. In 2011 he was elected to represent the newly created Ajuri County in 9th Parliament. He was re-elected in 2016 and 2021, and he is the incumbent MP.

In a cabinet reshuffle, on 14 December 2019, Obua was named to the cabinet. He replaced Charles Bakkabulindi, who was dropped from cabinet. After parliamentary approval, he swore in as State Minister for Sports, on 13 January 2020. Obua was chosen to be the Government chief whip and he took over office on 16 August 2022.

In the 2026-2031 cabinet term, President Yoweri Museveni replaced Obua with Dr. Jane Ruth Aceng, who took the oath of office for the position in June 2026, and Obua was appointed as a senior presidential advisor and chair of the National Resistance Movement (NRM) parliamentary caucus.

== Personal life ==
Obua is married.

== See also ==
- Lango College
- Ministry of Education and Sports (Uganda)
- Peter Ogwang
- Parliament of Uganda
- List of members of the eleventh Parliament of Uganda
- List of members of the tenth Parliament of Uganda
- John Babiiha
- Ruth Achieng
- David Bahati
- Bruce Baraba Kabaasa
