= Tress Bucyanayandi =

Ugandan agriculturalist and politician

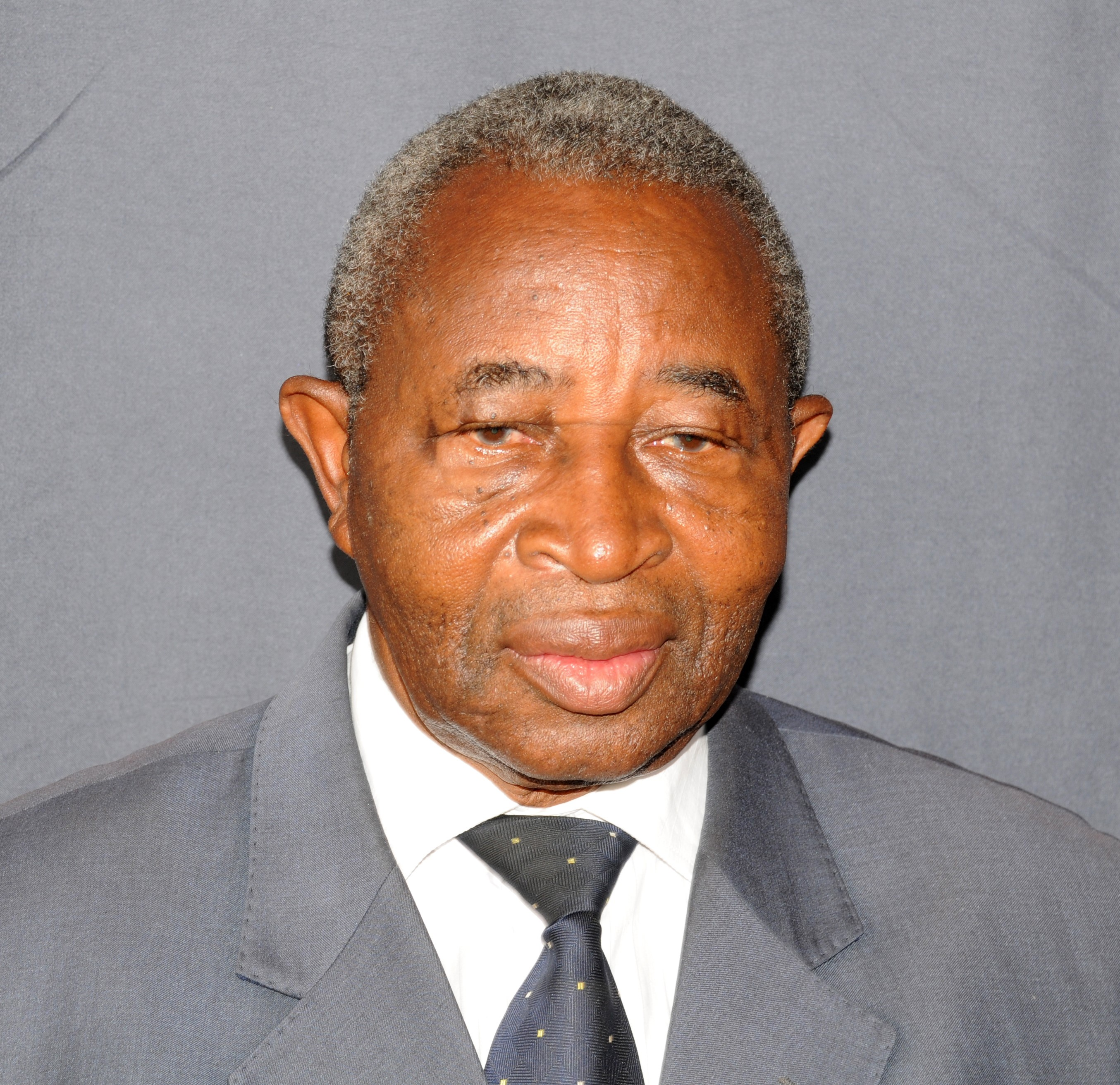
- Bucyanayandi Tress

Minister of Agriculture, Animal Industry & Fisheries

Personal details
- Born: Tress Bucyanayandi; 1 January 1938 (age 88) Kisoro, Uganda
- Citizenship: Uganda
- Spouse: Mrs. Bucyanayandi
- Education: Bukalasa Agricultural College (Diploma in Agriculture); West Virginia University (Bachelor of Science in Agriculture); University of Wisconsin–Madison (Master of Science in Agriculture)
- Occupation: Agriculturist & Politician
- Known for: Agriculture & Politics

Tress Bucyanayandi is a Ugandan agriculturalist and politician. He was the Minister for Agriculture, Animal Industry and Fisheries in the Ugandan Cabinet. He was appointed to that position on 27 May 2011. He replaced Hope Mwesigye, who was dropped from the Cabinet, and was replaced on 6 June 2016. He is also the elected Member of Parliament (MP) for Bufumbira County South parliamentary constituency, Kisoro District, in the Ugandan Parliament.

== Background and education ==
He was born in modern-day Kisoro District on 1 January 1938. At that time, the sub-region was known as Kigezi District. He studied at Bukalasa Agricultural College, graduating with the Diploma in Agriculture, in 1964. He was awarded a scholarship to continue his studies abroad. He entered the West Virginia University, graduating with the degree of Bachelor of Science in Agriculture in 1966. He transferred to the University of Wisconsin–Madison, where he obtained the degree of Master of Science in Agriculture in 1970.

== Career ==
Following his studies in the United States, he returned to Uganda and was appointed General Manager of Kinyara Sugar Works Limited, serving in that position until 1974. From Kinyara, he transferred to the headquarters of the Agriculture Ministry, as the Assistant Commissioner, serving in that capacity for the next ten years until 1985. In 1985, he was promoted to Deputy Commissioner of Agriculture, serving in that capacity until 1990. In 1990, he received another promotion to Director of Agriculture, serving in that capacity until 1993. In 1993, he left the Ministry of Agriculture when he was appointed Managing Director of Uganda Coffee Development Authority, the government regulatory agency responsible for regulation, supervision and supporting the coffee industry in the country, serving there until 2000. He entered national politics in 2006, when he successfully contested as the parliamentary representative for Bufumbira County South in Kisoro District. He was re-elected in 2011. In May 2011, he was appointed as Minister of Agriculture.

== See also ==
- Cabinet of Uganda
- Parliament of Uganda
- Kisoro District
- Denis Obua (politician)
- Parliament of Uganda
- John Babiiha
- Ruth Achieng
- David Bahati
