= Amolatar District =

- District
- District location in Uganda
- Coordinates: 01°38′N 32°50′E
- Country: Uganda
- Region: Northern Uganda
- Sub-region: Lango sub-region
- Capital: Amolatar

Area
  - Total: 1,758 km^{2} (679 sq mi)

Population (2010 Estimate)
  - Total: 127,400
  - Density: 72.5/km^{2} (188/sq mi)
- Time zone: UTC+3 (EAT)
- Website: www.amolatar.go.ug

Amolatar District is a district in Northern Uganda. Like many other Ugandan districts, it is named after its main municipal and administrative centre, Amolatar Town. The district is divided into two constituencies which include Kioga South and Kioga North.

== Location ==
Amolatar District is bordered by Apac District to the north, Dokolo District to the northeast, Kaberamaido District to the east, Buyende District to the southeast, Kayunga District to the south and Nakasongola District to the west. The administrative headquarters of the district at Amolatar, are located 85 kilometres (53 mi), by road, south of Lira, the largest city in the sub-region. This location lies about 185 kilometres (115 mi), by road, northeast of Kampala, the capital of Uganda and the largest city in that country. The coordinates of the district are: 01 38N, 32 50E.

== Overview ==
Amolatar District was formed in 2005, when it was carved out of Lira District. The district is part of the Lango sub-region, together with the other seven districts listed below. The constituent districts of the Lango sub-region are:

1. Amolatar District
2. Alebtong District
3. Apac District
4. Dokolo District
5. Kole District
6. Lira District
7. Oyam District
8. Otuke District

The district contains 346 villages, organized into 33 parishes. The district covers an area of approximately 1,758 square kilometres (679 mi^{2}). Administratively, the district is divided into the five administrative units:

1. Amolatar Town Council
2. Muntu Sub-county: 426.16 square kilometres (164.54 mi^{2})
3. Awelo Sub-county, Etam Town Council, Namasale Town Council 377.20 square kilometres (145.64 mi^{2})
4. Namasale Sub-county 524.18 square kilometres (202.39 mi^{2})
5. Aputi Sub-county 254.23 square kilometres (98.16 mi^{2}).

The district is known for the Amolatar Monument which marks the geographic centre of Uganda.

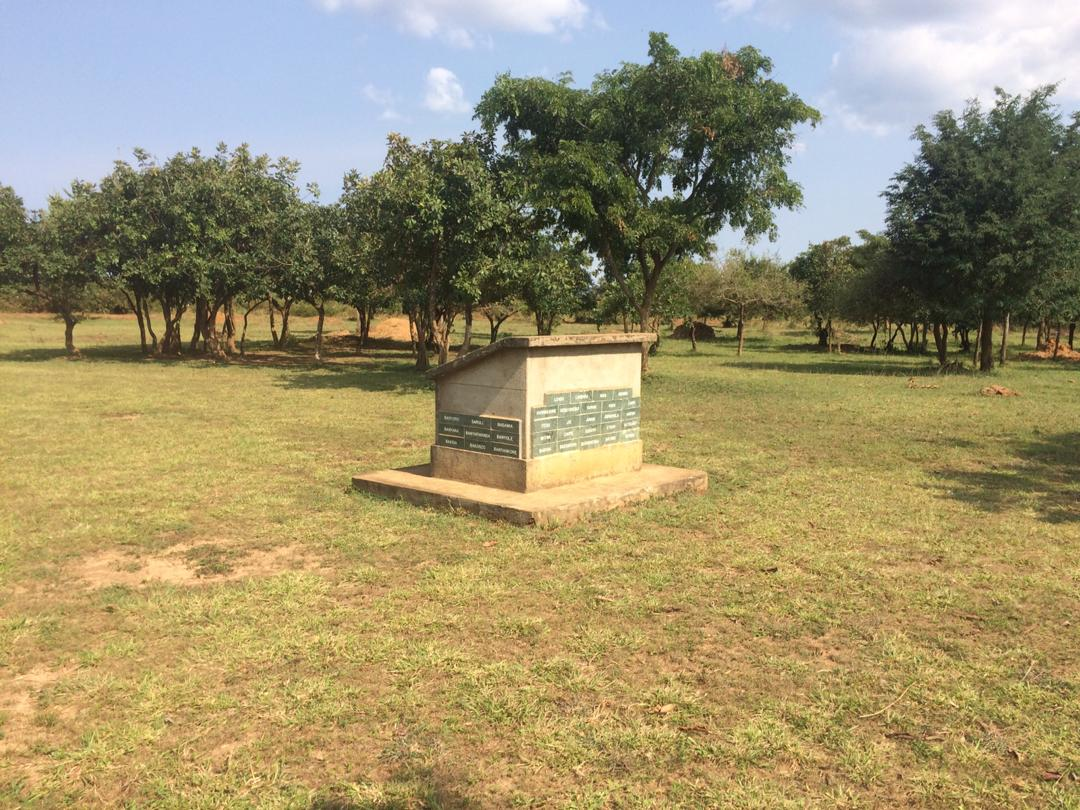
The Amolatar Monument

== Population ==
The 1991 national census estimated the district population at about 68,500. The 2002 national census estimated the population of the district at approximately 96,200. The district population is growing at an estimated annual rate of 2.9%, between 2002 and 2012. It is estimated that the population of the district in 2012 was about 127,400.

The table below summaries the population of Amolatar District in 2014 with other districts within Lango Sub-region.

DISTRICT	FEMALES	MALES	TOTAL	% FEMALE	% MALE
APAC	187,631	180,995	368,626	50.90009929	49.0999
LIRA	211,380	196,663	408,043	51.80336386	48.19664
AMOLATAR	74,152	73,014	147,166	50.38663822	49.61336
DOKOLO	93,617	89,476	183,093	51.13084607	48.86915
OYAM	196,523	187,121	383,644	51.22535476	48.77465
ALEBTONG	116,552	110,989	227,541	51.22241706	48.77758
KOLE	122,163	117,164	239,327	51.04438697	48.95561
OTUKE	53,067	51,187	104,254	50.90164406	49.09836
HIGHLY POPULATED	211,380	196,663	408,043	51.80336386	49.613362
LOWLY POPULATED	53,067	51,187	104,254	50.38663822	48.196636

According to Uganda Bureau of Statistics, Amolatar had a total households population of 187,442 (with 169,037 of this population having age below 60 and 18,385 being above 60 years) from 39,948 of total households counted. Out of this population, 97,649 are female constituting to 51.7% of the population and 91,066 being male(48.3% of the total population) and by the time of this exercise, 7,817 children from 6-12 years were not at school out of 17,466 of total age group population and 7,969 persons from 13-17 years were also not in school from a total age bracket population of 24,303

== Economic activities ==
Subsistence agriculture, animal husbandry and commercial fishing from area lakes constitute the economic engine of the district. Crops grown include:

- Cotton
- Cassava
- Sunflower
- Soybeans
- Oranges
- Bananas
- Matooke
- Simsim
- Rice
- Maize
- Beans
- Millet
- Sweet potatoes

== Other activities include ==
- Fishing
- Construction
- wholesale and Retail sales

== Livestock raised in the district include ==
- cattle
- goats
- chicken
- turkeys.
- Pig

== See also ==
- Amolatar
- Lango
- Northern Uganda
- Uganda Districts
- Lake Kyoga
