= Elizabeth Paula Napeyok =

Ugandan diplomat and former educator

Personal details
- Born: 24 December 1958 (age 67) Kangole
- Education: Makerere University

Elizabeth Paula Napeyok (born 24 December 1988) is a Ugandan diplomat. She serves as the Ambassador of Uganda to Italy with residence in Rome. She is the country's permanent representative to Food and Agriculture Organization, World Food Programme, and International Fund for Agricultural Development.

== Early life and education ==
Napeyok was born in Kangole and pursued her career in education where she extended knowledge to the education of girls in Uganda.

=== Academic background ===
- Diploma in Education (English/Geography): Awarded in 1976 from the National Teachers' College Kyambogo (now Kyambogo University).
- B.A. (Hons) Degree in Sociology/Social Administration: Received in 1988 from Makerere University in Kampala.

Before pursuing her university education, she completed her O-Level studies (East African Certificate of Education) in Gulu, Uganda, in 1972. Her educational journey laid the foundation for her early career as a teacher and development consultant before she transitioned into the diplomatic service.

== Career ==
1970s–Early 1990s: Education Sector

Napeyok began her professional life as a secondary school teacher in Northern Uganda. Her work in education included:

- Teaching at Kangole Girls Secondary School.
- Advancing to the role of head teacher.
- Serving as an Assistant District Education Secretary from 1985.

1991–2004: Development Consultancy

For over a decade, Napeyok worked as a development consultant. In this capacity, she collaborated with the Ugandan government, several UN agencies, and international humanitarian organizations. Her focus was on community development and humanitarian issues.

2004–Present: Diplomatic Service

Napeyok joined Uganda's Ministry of Foreign Affairs, where she has held several significant ambassadorial positions:

- Ambassador to France, Cuba, and India: Early diplomatic postings included serving as Uganda's Ambassador to Cuba and France, and as High Commissioner to India.
- Current Role (since 2017): Ambassador to Italy: She currently holds this position, residing in Rome.
- Permanent Representative to UN Agencies: Concurrently with her role as Ambassador to Italy, she is the permanent representative for Uganda to the three Rome-based United Nations food agencies:
  - Food and Agriculture Organization (FAO)
  - World Food Programme (WFP)
  - International Fund for Agricultural Development (IFAD)
- Non-Resident Ambassador: Her current diplomatic scope also covers nations like Serbia and Cyprus, where she serves as a non-resident ambassador/high commissioner to enhance bilateral ties and trade.

=== Awards and recognition ===
In 2013, Napeyok was appointed as the Ugandan High Commissioner to India. Napeyok was accredited as Her Excellency in 2017 by the Government of Uganda. The ambassador offers support to international investors and Ugandans in the diaspora to identify investment opportunities for economic growth.

Napeyok has been recognized for her contributions with two Presidential Awards: one for her work in promoting girls' education and another for export promotion.

== Personal life ==
Elizabeth Paula Napeyok is a mother of two children.

== See also ==
- Joy Ruth Acheng
- Parliarment of Uganda
