= Bruce Baraba Kabaasa =

Ugandan politician and Member of Parliament

Member of Parliament for Rubanda West County
- Incumbent
- Assumed office 2026

Personal details
- Party: National Resistance Movement
- Occupation: Politician

Bruce Baraba Kabaasa (some times styled Bruce Balaba Kabaasa) is a Ugandan politician and the Member of Parliament representing Rubanda West County in the 12th Parliament of Uganda.

He contested and won the seat in the 2026 general election on the ticket of the National Resistance Movement (NRM) party.

== Political career ==
Kabaasa emerged as the NRM party flag bearer for Rubanda West in the run-up to the 2026 general elections, defeating incumbent Moses Kamuntu Mwongyera in a closely contested primary.

His victory in the NRM primaries was upheld after a party tribunal dismissed a petition challenging the outcome, confirming his position as the NRM candidate for the constituency.

In the 2026 general election, Kabaasa received strong support from voters in the largely rural constituency.

== See also ==
- List of members of the twelfth Parliament of Uganda
- Denis Obua (politician)
- Parliament of Uganda
- John Babiiha
- Ruth Achieng
- David Bahati
- Twaha Kagabo
