= Mwebesa =

Mwebesa is a surname of African origin.

== People with the surname ==
- Christine Ntegamahe Mwebesa, Ugandan medical doctor and former Member of Parliament
- Francis Mwebesa, Ugandan government minister
