= Otuke District =

District in Uganda

- District
- District location in Uganda
- Coordinates: 02°30′N 33°30′E
- Country: Uganda
- Region: Northern Uganda
- Sub-region: Lango sub-region
- Otuke: 1 July 2009

Area
  - Total: 1,549.8 km^{2} (598.4 sq mi)
- Elevation: 1,200 m (3,900 ft)

Population (2012 est.)
  - Total: 86,000
  - Density: 55.5/km^{2} (144/sq mi)
- Time zone: UTC+3 (EAT)
- Website: www.otuke.go.ug

Otuke District is a district in Northern Uganda. Like many other Ugandan districts, Otuke district is named after its 'chief town', Otuke, where the district headquarters are located.

== Location ==
Otuke District is bordered by Agago District to the north, Abim District to the northeast, Napak District to the east, Amuria District to the southeast, Alebtong District to the south, Lira District to the southwest and Pader District to the northwest. Otuke, where the district headquarters are located, lies approximately 66 kilometres (41 mi), by road, east of Lira, the largest city in the sub-region. The coordinates of the district are:02 30N, 33 30E (Latitude:2.5000; Longitude:33.5000).

== Overview ==
Otuke District was carved out of Lira District effective 1 July 2009. The district is administered by the Otuke District Administration, with its headquarters at Otuke. Otuke is among the nine districts that make up Lango sub-region, which consists of the districts listed below. Lango sub-region was home to an estimated 1.5 million Langi, in 2002, according to the national census conducted that year.

- Alebtong District
- Amolatar District
- Apac District
- Dokolo District
- Kole District
- Lira District
- Otuke District
- Oyam District
- Kwania District

== Population ==
In 1991, the district population was estimated at 43,500. The 2002 national census estimated the population of the district at approximately 62,000. In 2012, the population of Otuke District was estimated at 86,000.

== Economy ==
- Maize
- Simsim
- Trade and Commance
- Livestock Farming
- Fishing
- Beans
- Cassava

== Livestocks ==
- Pig
- Goat
- Poultry
- Sheep
- Cattle

== See also ==
- Otuke
- Lango sub-region
- Districts of Uganda
- Northern Region, Uganda
- Parliament of Uganda
