= Kole, Uganda =

Kole Kole Municipality
- Location in Uganda
- Coordinates: 02°25′43″N 32°48′04″E
- Country: Uganda
- Region: Northern Uganda
- Sub-region: Lango sub-region
- District: Kole District
- Established: 1 July 2010
- Elevation: 3,600 ft (1,100 m)

Kole is a town in Northern Uganda. It is the main municipal, administrative and commercial center of Kole District. The district is named after the town.

== Location ==
Kole is located approximately 290 kilometres (180 mi) north of Kampala, Uganda's capital and largest city, and approximately 28 kilometres (17 mi), by road, northwest of Lira, the largest city in Lango sub-region. The coordinates of Kole, Uganda are:2°25'43.0"N, 32°48'04.0"E (Latitude:2.428600; Longitude:32.801123).

== Points of interest ==
The following points of interest are found in Kole:

- The headquarters of Kole District Administration
- The offices of Kole Town Council
- Kole Central Market.

== See also ==
- Northern Region, Uganda
