= Alebtong =

Ugandan town

Alebtong Alebtongo
- Location in Uganda
- Coordinates: 02°15′00″N 33°18′54″E
- Country: Uganda
- Region: Northern Region of Uganda
- Sub-region: Lango Sub-region
- District: Alebtong District
- Elevation: 3,563 ft (1,086 m)

Population (2020 Estimate)
  - Total: 7,900

Alebtong is a town in the Northern Region of Uganda. It is the chief municipal, administrative, and commercial centre of Alebtong District. The district is named after the town.

== Location ==
Alebtong lies on the main road between the city of Lira, in Lira District to the west, and the town of Omoro, in Alebtong District to the east. This town is approximately 51 kilometres (32 mi), by road, east of Lira, the largest city in the Lango sub-region. Alebtong is about 151 kilometres (94 mi) southeast of Gulu, the largest city in Uganda's Northern Region.

Alebtong is located about 388 kilometres (241 mi) by road northeast of Kampala, the capital of Uganda and its largest city. The geographical coordinates of Alebtong Town Council are: 2°15'00.0"N, 33°18'54.0"E (Latitude:2.2500; Longitude:33.3150).

== Population ==
In 2013, it was estimated that within a radius of 7 kilometres (4 mi) from the center of the town, the total population is approximately 15,100.

In 2015, Uganda Bureau of Statistics (UBOS) estimated the population of the town at 6,900. In 2020, UBOS estimated the mid-year population of Alebtong Town Council at 7,900 inhabitants; of whom 4,000 (50.6 percent) were females and 3,900 (49.4 percent) were males. UBOS calculated that between 2015 and 2020, the population of Alebtong Town Council increased at an average rate of 2.7 percent annually.

Historical population
Year	Pop.	±%
2013	15,100	—
2015	6,900	−54.3%
2020	7,900	+14.5%

== Points of interest ==
The following points of interest lie within the town limits or close to the edges of the town: (a) the offices of Alebtong Town Council (b) the headquarters of Alebtong District Administration (c) Alebtong Central Market, the source of daily fresh produce (d) Alebtong Health Center IV, a public health unit administered by the Uganda Ministry of Health and (e) Lira-Omoro Road, passing through Alebtong in a northwest to southeast direction.

== See also ==
- Langi people
- List of cities and towns in Uganda
