= Otuke =

Otuke Otuke Town
- Location in Uganda
- Coordinates: 02°26′39″N 33°30′10″E
- Country: Uganda
- Region: Northern Uganda
- Sub-region: Lango sub-region
- District: Otuke District
- Established: 1 July 2009
- Elevation: 3,900 ft (1,200 m)

Otuke is a town in Otuke District, Lango sub-region, in Northern Uganda. It is the chief municipal, administrative and commercial center of the district and the district headquarters are located in the town. The district is named after the town.

== Location ==
Otuke is located 66 kilometres (41 mi) east of Lira, the largest city in the sub-region and 310 kilometres (190 mi), north of Kampala, Uganda's capital and its largest city. The coordinates of Otuke are:2°26'39.0"N, 33°30'10.0"E (Latitude:2.444175; Longitude:33.502766).

== Population ==
The population of the town of Otuke is approximately 161,000.

== Points of interest ==
The following points of interest lie within or near the town limits:

- The headquarters of Otuke District Administration
- The offices of Otuke Town Council
- Otuke Central Market
- Orum Health Centre IV

== See also ==
- Otuke District
- Lango sub-region
- Northern Uganda
