= Joy Ruth Acheng =

Ugandan politician

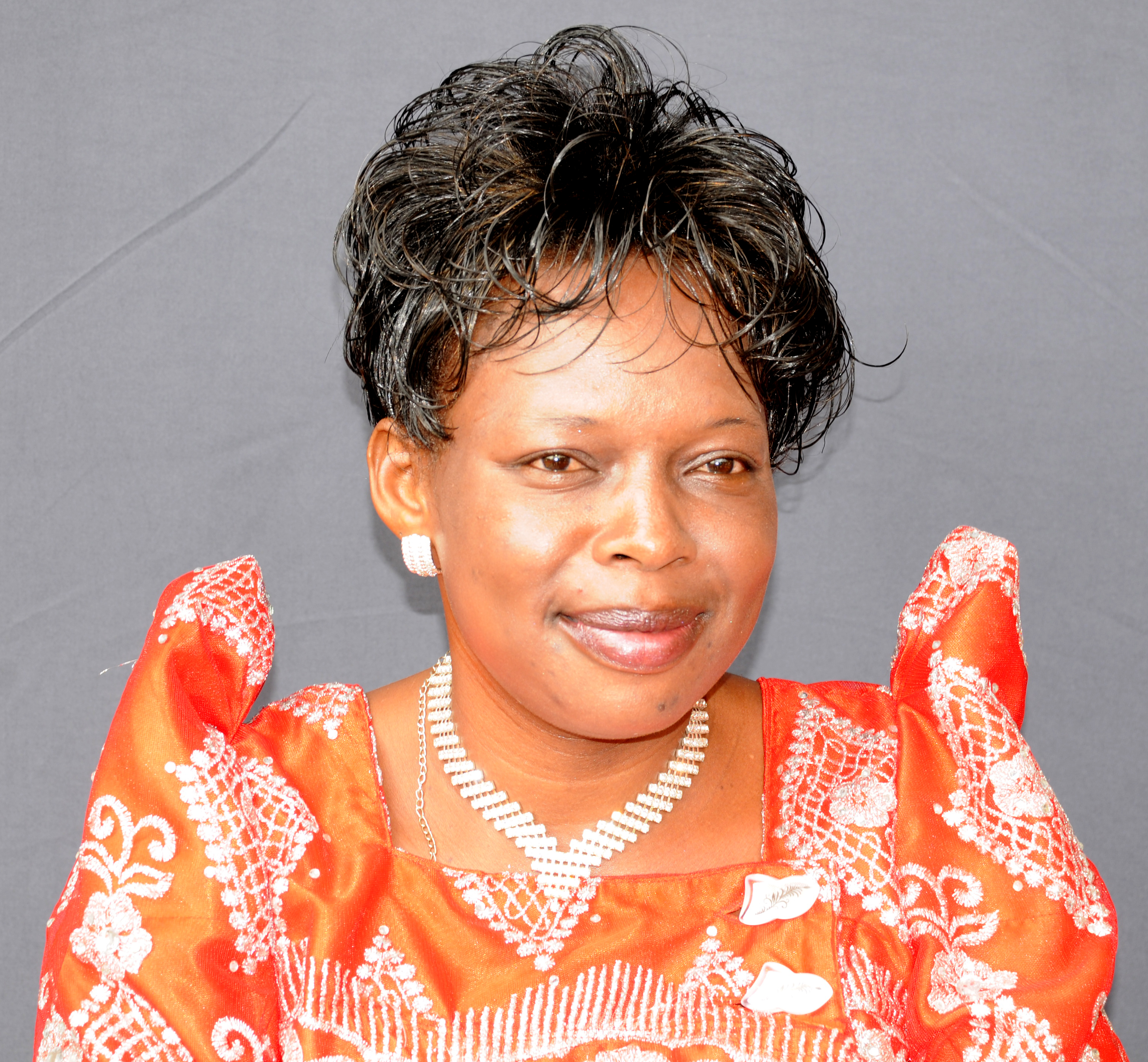

Uganda Ambassador to The Bahamas
- In office 17 June 2024 – present

Uganda Ambassador to Canada
- In office 2017–2024

Member of the Uganda Parliament for Kole District
- In office 2011–2016

Personal details
- Party: Uganda People's Congress
- Parent: Ejang Margaret Obia (mother)

Joy Ruth Acheng is a Ugandan diplomat, Ambassador and High Commissioner to Ottawa, Canada as of 12 September 2017. She is a member of the Uganda People's Congress and was elected to the 9th Parliament of Uganda as such in 2011.

== Early life and education ==
Acheng was born to Ejang Margaret Obia. She holds a Masters in Management Studies, a Bachelor of Education and Certificate in Administrative Law.

== Career ==
Acheng served as Kole District Woman Member of Parliament in the 9th Parliament of Uganda (2011–2016). She was appointed minister of state for Fisheries by Yoweri Kaguta Museveni President Museveni but he later revoked the appointment. She was a member of the Physical Infrastructure and HIV/Aids committee in the 9th Parliament of Uganda from 2011 to 2016.

She was Uganda's High Commissioner and Ambassador to Canada 12 September 2017.

== Controversy ==
In August 2024, the Canadian government declared Acheng persona non grata for allegedly engaging in uncouth behaviour and deported her. She was subsequently appointed the head of mission in the The Bahamas. The president revoked her appointment as a minister for fisheries which was protested by the people of Kole

== See also ==
- List of ambassadors and high commissioners to Canada
- Parliament of Uganda
