= Christine Ntegamahe Mwebesa =

Ugandan medical doctor, legislator and Member of Parliament

Christine Ntegamahe Mwebesa Honourable

Deputy Chairperson, Uganda Health Service Commission 2016 to date

Constituent Assembly Delegate, Kabale district 1994 -1995

Woman Member of Parliament, Kabale district 1996-2001
- Succeeded by: Hope Mwesigye

Personal details
- Born: Christine Ntegamahe Mwebesa
- Occupation: Medical doctor Legislator

Christine Ntegamahe Mwebesa is a Ugandan medical doctor and former Member of Parliament who represented Kabale district in the 1994 Uganda's sixth parliament (1996 -2001). She was replaced by Hope Mwesigye in the 2002 General Elections. Prior to becoming a member of parliament, she had represented the same constituency as a Delegate in the 1994 Constituent Assembly.

== Career ==
In the 1994 Ugandan Constituent Assembly election, Mwebesa was elected to represent Kabale district. Later on, she served as the Woman Representative for the same constituency in Uganda's sixth parliament between 1996 and 2001.

In 2016, she was one of the recipients of the 50th independence Golden Jubilee Medal "in recognition of their outstanding service and loyalty to the county from 9th October 1962 to 9th October 2012".

Still in 2016, she was nominated for and approved as the deputy chairperson of Uganda's Health Service Commission, a position she holds to date.

== See also ==
- Parliament of Uganda
- Kabale district
- Hope Mwesigye
