= Ruth Achieng =

Ugandan politician

Woman Member of Parliament for Kole District
- In office 2011–2016

Personal details
- Occupation: Politician

Ruth Achieng is a Ugandan politician. She was appointed, but she never served as, State Minister for Fisheries in the Cabinet of Uganda on 6 June 2016, replacing Zerubabel Nyiira. Ruth Achieng served in the 9th Parliament (2011–2016) as the Kole District Woman Representative before losing in the 2016 election cycle. Her name was withdrawn at the last minute and she was not vetted by the parliamentary appointments committee, resulting in her not being sworn in on 22 June 2016.

== See also ==
- Parliament of Uganda
- John Babiiha
- Tress Bucyanayandi
