= Hope Mwesigye =

Ugandan lawyer and politician

- Born: 28 December 1956 (age 69); Uganda
- Citizenship: Uganda
- Education: Makerere University (Bachelor of Laws) (Master of Arts In Gender Studies); Law Development Center (Diploma in Legal Practice)
- Occupations: Lawyer & Politician
- Years active: 1980 — 2011
- Known for: Politics

Hope Ruhindi Mwesigye is a Ugandan lawyer and politician. She is the former Minister for Agriculture, Animal Industry & Fisheries from 16 February 2009 until 27 May 2011. Prior to that, she served as the State Minister for Local Government, from June 2006 until February 2011. In the cabinet reshuffle of 27 May 2011, she was dropped from the cabinet and replaced by Tress Bucyanayandi.

== Early life and education ==
She was born on 28 December 1956, in Kabale District. She attended Kabale High School' for her O-Level studies, And Trinity College Nabbingo for her A-Level education. Ms. Mwesigye went on to obtain a law degree (Bachelor of Law) with Honors, from Makerere University. She also holds the Diploma in Legal Practice, from the Law Development Center in Kampala. In addition, she attained the Master of Arts (MA) degree in Women and Gender Studies.

== Work experience ==
Hope Mwesigye worked as a Senior State Attorney in the Ugandan Ministry of Justice for eight years prior to 1988. Between 1988 and 1991, she worked as the Program Officer at Uganda Gender Resources Center, a private non profit organization. Between 1991 and 2001, she served as the executive director of the same non-profit. She has also served as a Program Officer for FIDA (Uganda), another Ugandan non-profit specializing in championing the rights of women. In 2001, she entered elective politics and was elected to the parliamentary seat of Kabale District Women's Representative. She was re-elected in 2006 on the National Resistance Movement political party ticket. She lost her re-election bid in 2011 to Ronah Ninsiima, an Independent politician, who is the incumbent MP for Kabale Women's Representative. In the cabinet reshuffle of 27 May 2011, she was dropped from the cabinet.

== Personal Details ==
She is reported to enjoy community mobilization drives for development. She is married and she is the mother of four children.

== See also ==
- Cabinet of Uganda
- Parliament of Uganda
- Kabale District
