= Geographic centre of Uganda =

Place in Uganda

Coordinates: 1.588130°N 32.717280°E

Geographic centre of Uganda

The geographic centre of Uganda is located north of Lake Kyoga in Olyaka village, Olyaka parish in Namasale sub-county in Amolatar District, Northern Uganda.

The point is marked by the Amolatar Monument (or Uganda Tribes Monument) which displays the names of all ethnic tribes in Uganda. The Amolatar peninsula offered refuge to different tribes during the Karimojong cattle rustling of the 1970s through to the 1980s and early 1990s most of whom ended up settling in the district. The monument also holds spiritual significance, with prayer groups gathering for prayer sessions, especially on the Day of Atonement, which occurs in late September or early October.

The government of Amolatar District are working to develop the site into a tourist attraction that can display flora and fauna from throughout Uganda.

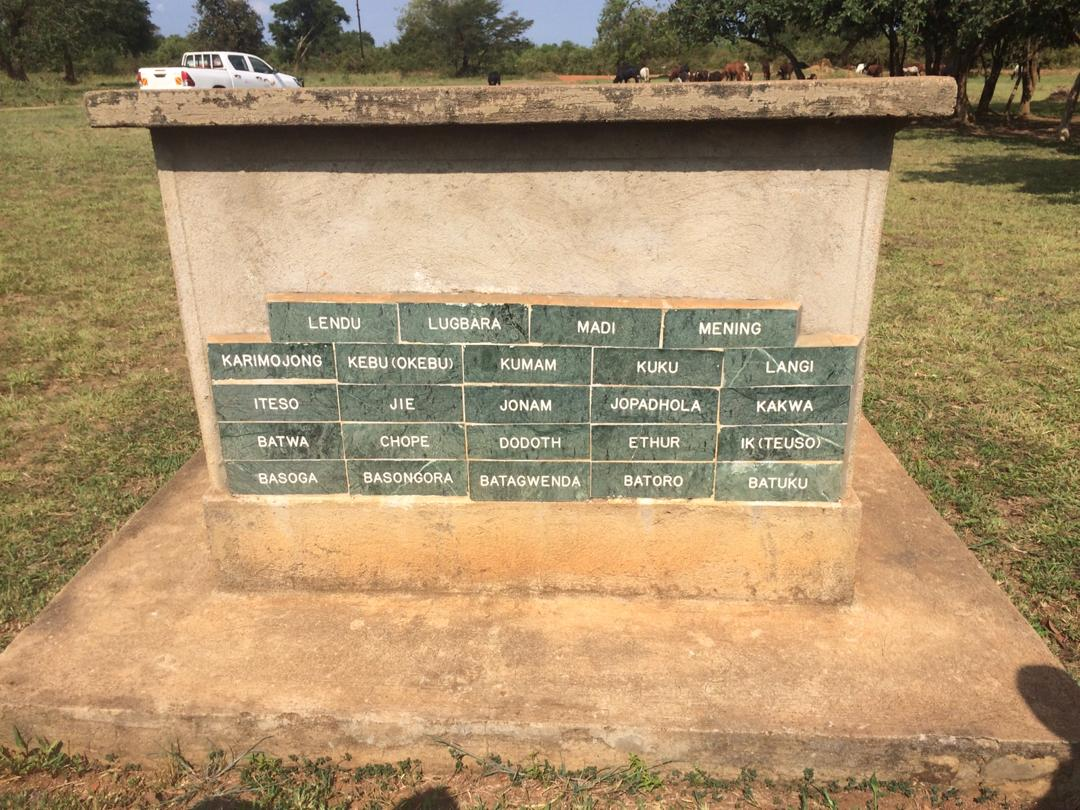
Amolatar Monument seen from West a.k.a. Uganda Tribes Monument

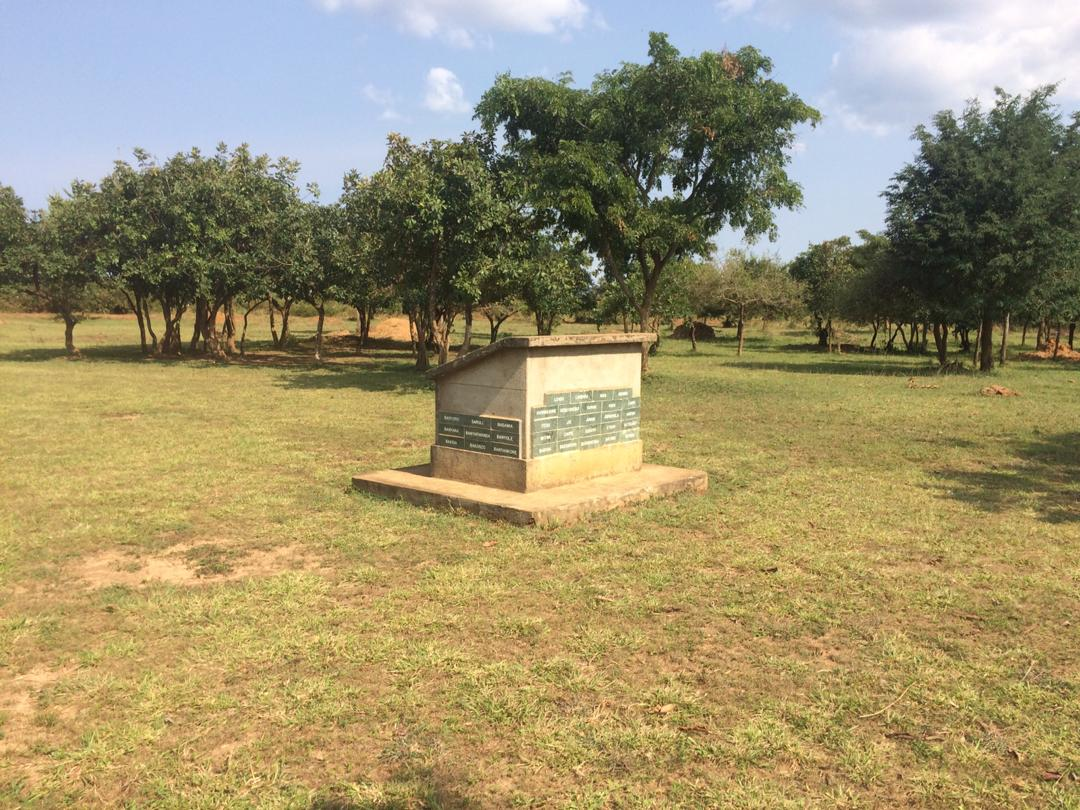
Amolatar Monument seen from North-west

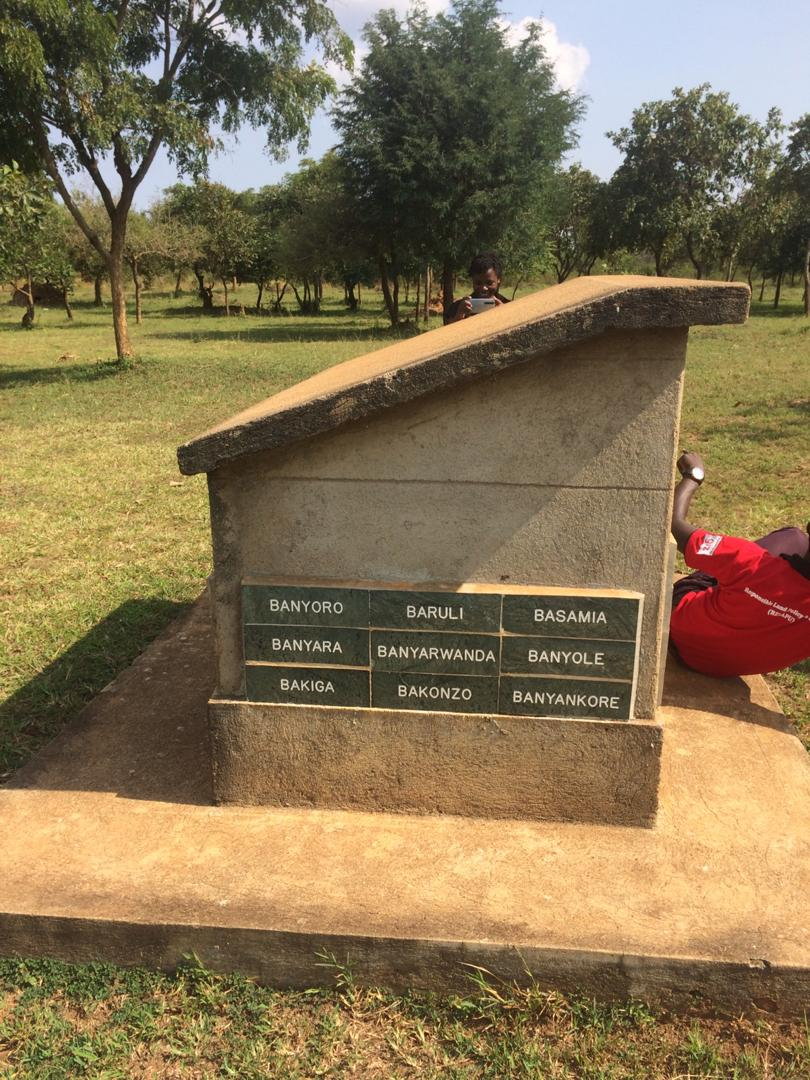
Amolatar Monument seen from North

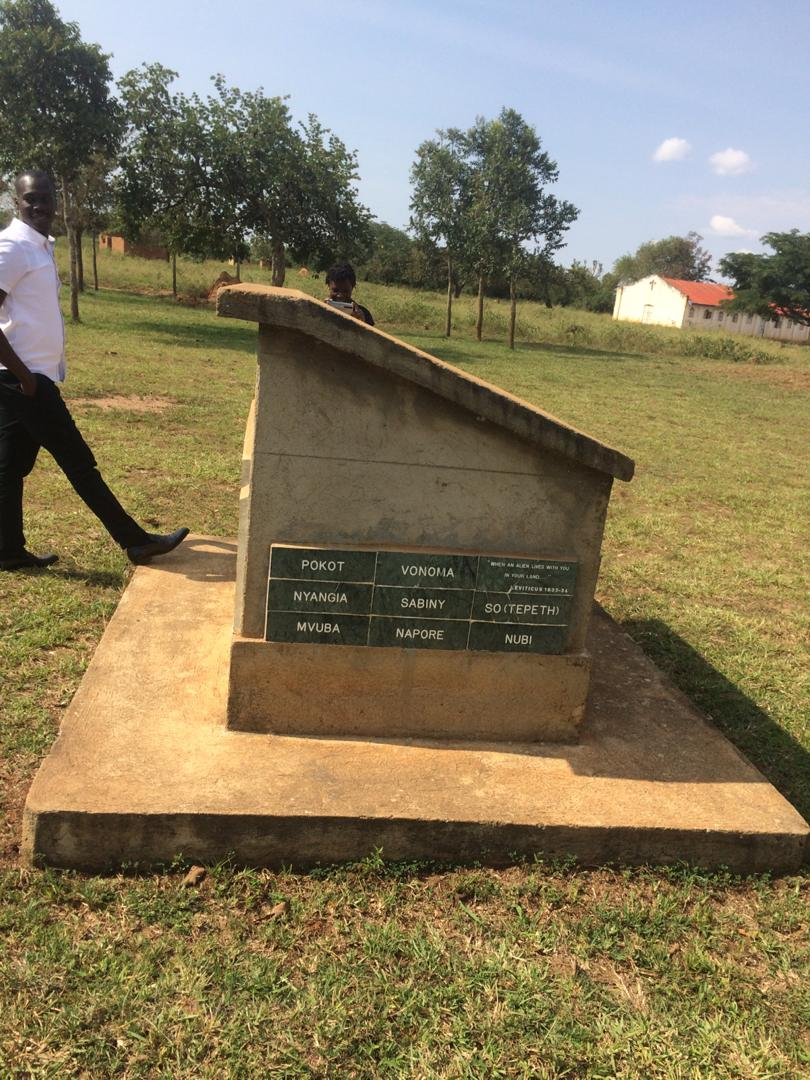
Amolatar Monument seen from South

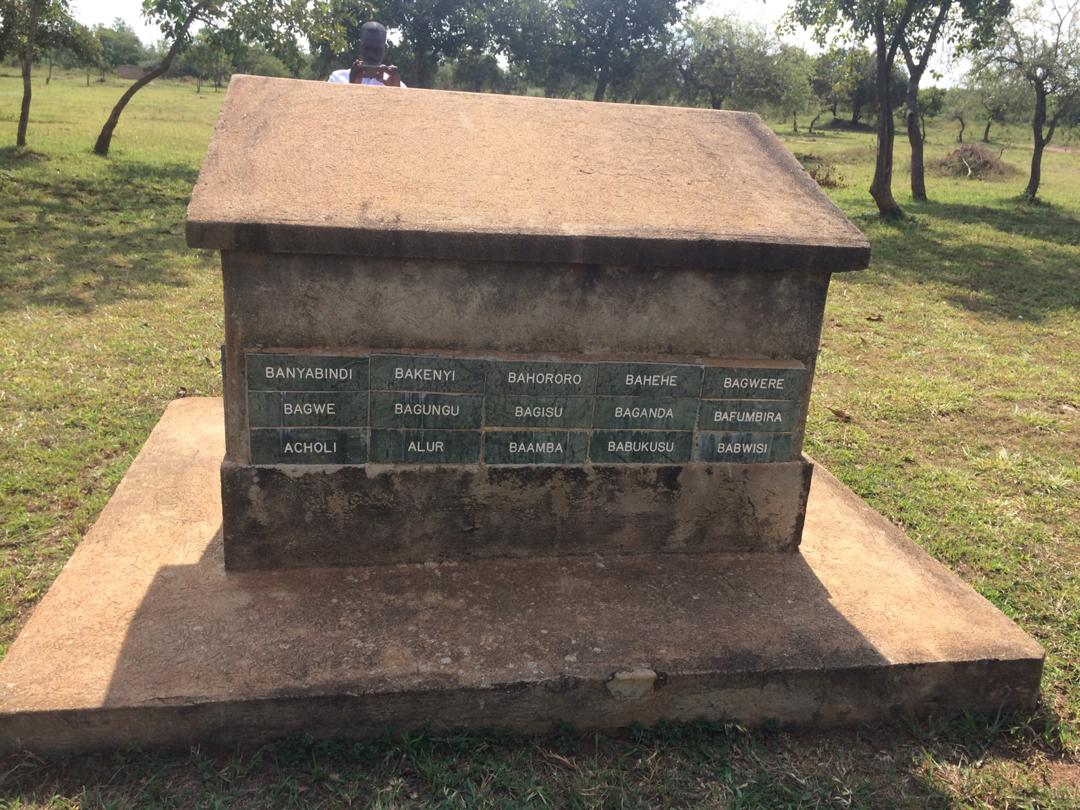
Amolatar Monument seen from East

The method by which the coordinates of this geographical centre were determined is not known. The centre point of a bounding box completely enclosing the area of Uganda results in another pair of coordinates (1.368153|N|32.303236|E) which belongs to a point along Kampala–Gulu Highway, west of Lake Kyoga.
