= Kole District =

- District
- District location in Uganda
- Coordinates: 02°24′N 32°48′E
- Country: Uganda
- Region: Northern Uganda
- Sub-region: Lango sub-region
- Established: 1 July 2010
- Capital: Kole

Area
  - Total: 2,847 km^{2} (1,099 sq mi)

Population (2012 Estimate)
  - Total: 231,969
  - Density: 81.48/km^{2} (211.0/sq mi)
- Time zone: UTC+3 (EAT)
- Website: kole.go.ug

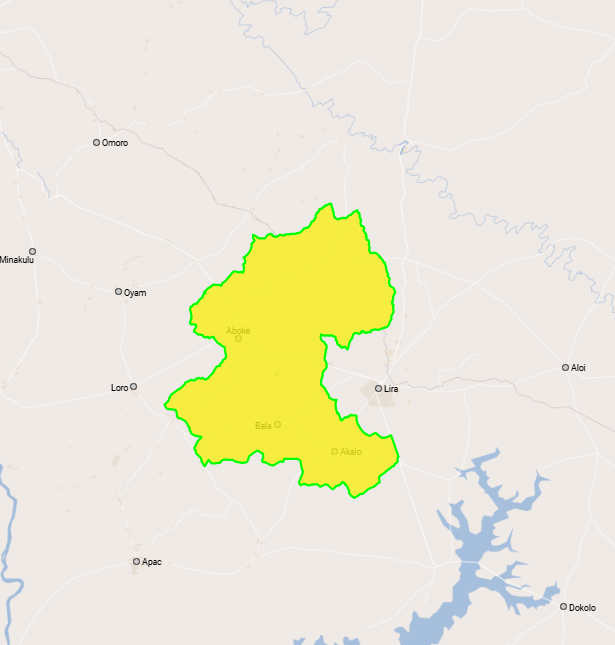
Sketch map of Kole District

Kole District is a district in Northern Uganda. Like most other Ugandan districts, it is named after its 'chief town', Kole, where the district headquarters are located.

== Location ==
Kole District is bordered by Lira District to the east, Apac District to the south and Oyam District to the west and north. Kole, the district capital, is located approximately 28 kilometres (17 mi), by road, northwest of Lira, the largest city in the sub-region. This location is approximately 290 kilometres (180 mi), by road, north of Kampala, Uganda's capital and largest city. The coordinates of the district are:02 24N, 32 48E.

== Overview ==
Kole District was created by an Act of Parliament and became operational on 1 July 2010. Earlier, it was part of Apac District. The district is part of Lango sub-region, home to an estimated 1.5 million people, in 2002, according to the national census. The sub-region comprises the following districts: (a) Alebtong District (b) Amolatar District (c) Apac District (d) Dokolo District (e) Kole District (f) Lira District (g) Otuke District and (h) Oyam District. Kole district is subdivided into the following sub-counties: 1. Aboke 2. Akalo 3. Alito 4. Ayer and 5. Bala

== Population ==
The 2002 national census estimated the population of the district at about 165,900. The population of the district was estimated at 231,900 as of July 2012.

From 2014 to 2024, population of Kole grew by 2.1% making it to have a total population of 294,301 compare to that of 27 August 2014, which was about 239,327. The population of Kole is distributed by 274.3/km² because the district covers about 1,073 km² Area.

== Economic activity ==
- Farming
- Comnstruction
- Printing Services
- Bookshop Business

== Livestock kept ==
- Chicken
- Cattle
- Goat

== See also ==
- Kole
- Lango sub-region
- Northern Region, Uganda
- Districts of Uganda
- Parliament
