= Lira University =

Public university in Uganda

Coordinates: 2°15′04″N 32°49′16″W

- Motto: "The Beacon"
- Type: Public
- Established: 1 July 2012; 14 years ago
- Chancellor: Benjamin Josses Odoki
- Vice-Chancellor: Jasper Ogwal Okeng
- Students: 1,000+ (2019)
- Location: 7R2C+9CV, Lira, Uganda, Lira, Uganda
- Campus: Urban
- Website: www.lirauni.ac.ug
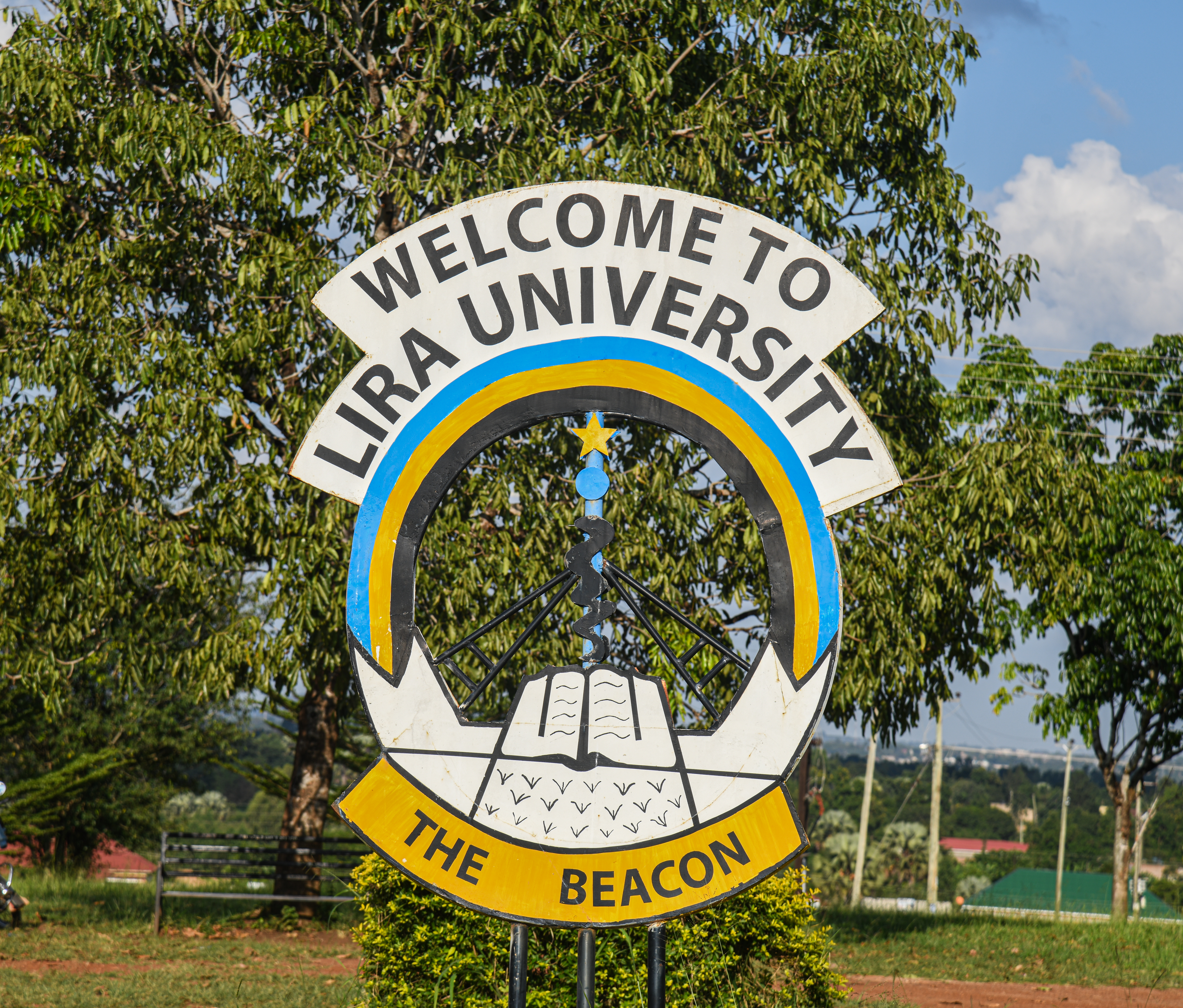

- Location within Uganda

Lira University (LU) is one of the public university in Lira, Uganda. It is one of the eleven public universities and degree-awarding institutions in the country. It was initially established in 2009 as a constituent college of Gulu University and attained autonomy as a fully-fledged public university through an Act of Parliament under Statutory Instrument 2015 No. 35 on 16 July 2015. Lira University was founded with a focus on health sciences and hosts the first university teaching hospital in Uganda.

== Location ==
The university campus is situated on approximately 621 acres (251.3 hectares) of land, northwest of downtown Lira, off 500 acres (202 ha) of land, 68.7km from Kamdini.

== History ==
Lira University first opened in August 2012 with 100 students. At that time, the institution was a constituent college of Gulu University and was known as Gulu University Constituent College Lira in 2009. It was also referred to as Lira University College.

In June 2015, the Uganda Ministry of Education elevated the college to university status, effective with the 2016-2017 academic year that began in August 2016.

== Notable administrators at lira university ==
- Benjamin Joses Odok as the Chancellor Lira university
- Jasper Watson Ogwal‑Okeng as the Vice Chancellor Lira university
- Judith Akello Abal as Acting Deputy Vice Chancellor Lira university

== Halls of Residence ==
These halls are privately owned.

=== Hostel ===
| Mixed =

See list
- Blackroof
  Maracourts
  Melenium
  Pilipo elite
  Mendera
  Northern elite
  Emmanuela
  Maisha
  St.Peters
  Gods mercy
  Masengere
  Fly emirates
  Madick
  Sam's quality
  Blacck roof
  Florida

=== For girls only ===
- Pioneer
- Glorianta

== Faculties at lira university ==
As of January 2016, Lira University maintained the following academic units:

- Faculty of Computing and information science
- Faculty of Nursing and Midwifery
- Faculty of Public Health
- Faculty of Management Sciences
- Faculty of Medicine
- Faculty of Education

== Programs ==
As of July 2024, the following undergraduate and postgraduate academic programs were offered:

=== Bachelors Programs ===
- Bachelor of Computer Science
- Bachelor of Information and Communications Technology
- Bachelor of Computer Animation
- Bachelor of Medicine and Surgery
- Bachelor of Science in Community Psychology and Psychotherapy
- Bachelor of Science in Midwifery
- Bachelor of Library and Information Science
- Bachelor of Science in Public Health
- Bachelor of Human Nutrition and Dietics
- Bachelor of Science with Education (Physical, Biological, Agricultural and Economics)
- Bachelor of Education (Primary and secondary)
- Bachelor of Computer Education
- Bachelor of Public Administration and Management
- Bachelor of Science in Economics
- Bachelor of Business Administration
- Bachelor of Commerce
- Bachelor of Science in Accounting and Finance

=== Masters Programs ===
- Master of Midwifery Science
- Executive Master of Business Administration
- Master of Public Health
- Master of Arts in Public Administration and Management
- Master of Mental Health Counseling

=== Postgraduate Programs ===
- Postgraduate Diploma in Educational management and Practices
- Postgraduate Diploma in Public Administration and Management
- Postgraduate Diploma in Financial Management
- Postgraduate Diploma of Education

=== Certificate programs ===
- Higher Education Access Certificate Programme-Physical Sciences.
- Higher Education Access Certificate Programme-Biological Sciences.
- Higher Education Access Certificate Programme-General.

== University management ==
| Position | Name |
|---|---|
| Chancellor | Benjamin Joses Odoki |
| Vice Chancellor | Jasper Watson Ogwal‑Okeng |
| Acting Deputy Vice Chancellor | Judith Akello Abal |
| Acting University Secretary | Tom Richard Atim |
| Acting Bursar | Elemu Anthony |
| Acting University Librarian | Andrew Ojulong |
| Acting Dean of Students | James Bond Opok |
| Academic Registrar | Geoffrey Angela |

University Council

The University Council is the highest decision‑making / policy‑making body.

| Position | Name |
|---|---|
| Chairperson | David Geoffrey Opio Okello |
| Vice Chairperson | Nellie Florence Okullo |
| Vice Chancellor | Jasper Watson Ogwal‑Okeng |
| Deputy Vice Chancellor | Okaka Opio Dokotum |
| Secretary | Augustine Oyang Atubo |
| Chair‑Audit & Risk Management Committee | Rosie Agoi |
| Chair‑Quality Assurance, ICT & Library Committee | Florence Ebila |
| Chair‑Finance, Planning & Investment Committee | Timothy Jokkene Okee |
| Chair‑Estates & Works Committee | Robert Omara |
| Chair‑Hospital Committee | David Martin Ogwang |
| Chair‑Appointments Board | Bosco Onyik Ogwal |
| Chair‑Students’ Welfare & Discipline | Fredrick Dickens Odongo |
| Other members | Falidah Wadumaga, Moses Kaahwa, Sam Atul |

== Deans of Faculties ==
| Faculties | Name of the faculty deans |
|---|---|
| Education | Elizabeth Amongi |
| Management sciences | Judith Akello Abal |
| Nursing and Midwifery | Anna Grace Auma |
| Medicine | Francis Olwa |
| Public Health | Marc Sam Opollo |
| Computing and Information Sciences | Nelson Ojuka |

== See also ==
- List of university leaders in Uganda
- List of universities in Uganda
- List of business schools in Uganda
- Education in Uganda
- Parliament of Uganda
- Gulu University
