= Lira District =

- District
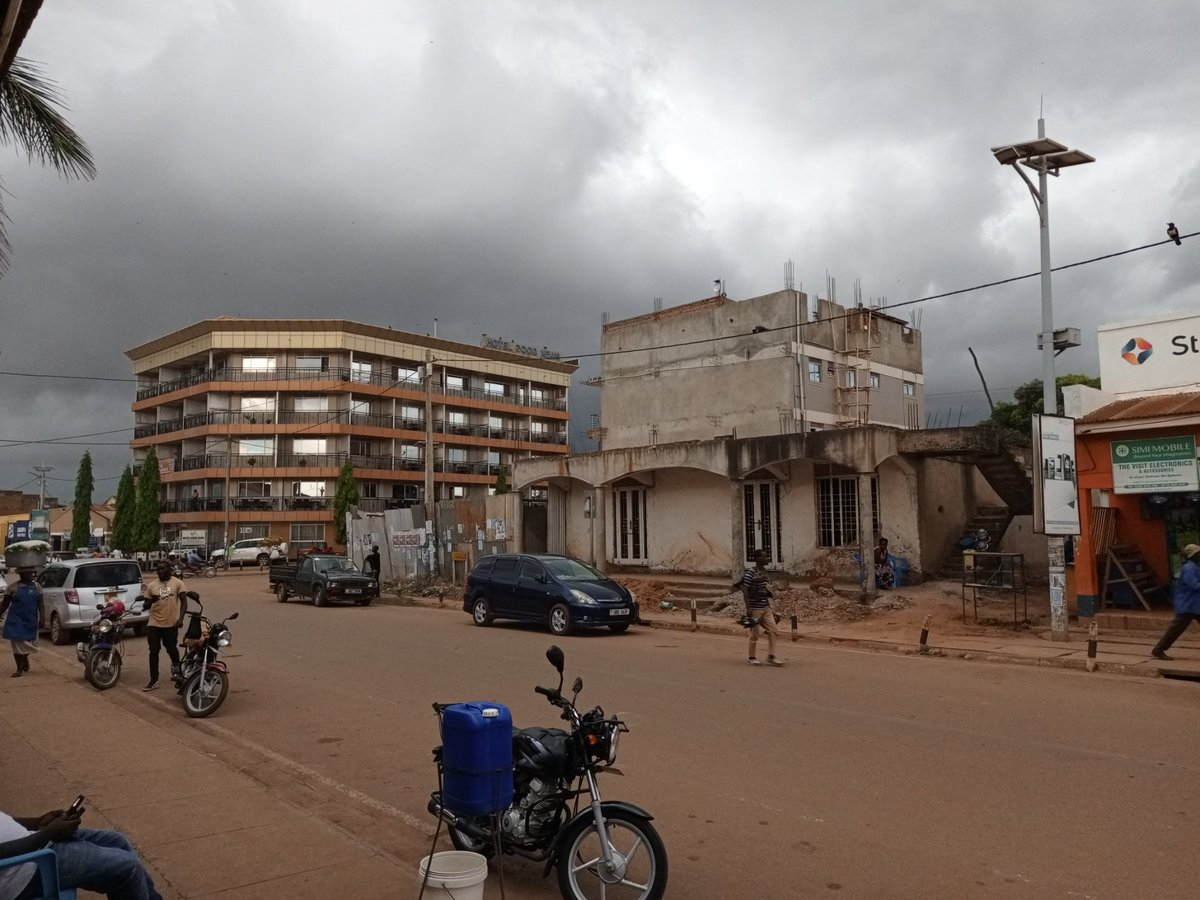
- Lira City

- District location in Uganda
- Coordinates: 02°20′N 33°06′E
- Country: Uganda
- Region: Northern Uganda
- Sub-region: Lango sub-region
- Capital: Lira

Area
  - Total: 1,368.9 km^{2} (528.5 sq mi)
  - Land: 1,328.9 km^{2} (513.1 sq mi)
  - Water: 40 km^{2} (15 sq mi)
- Elevation: 1,080 m (3,540 ft)

Population (2012 Estimate)
  - Total: 403,100
  - Density: 303.3/km^{2} (786/sq mi)
- Time zone: UTC+3 (EAT)
- Website: www.lira.go.ug

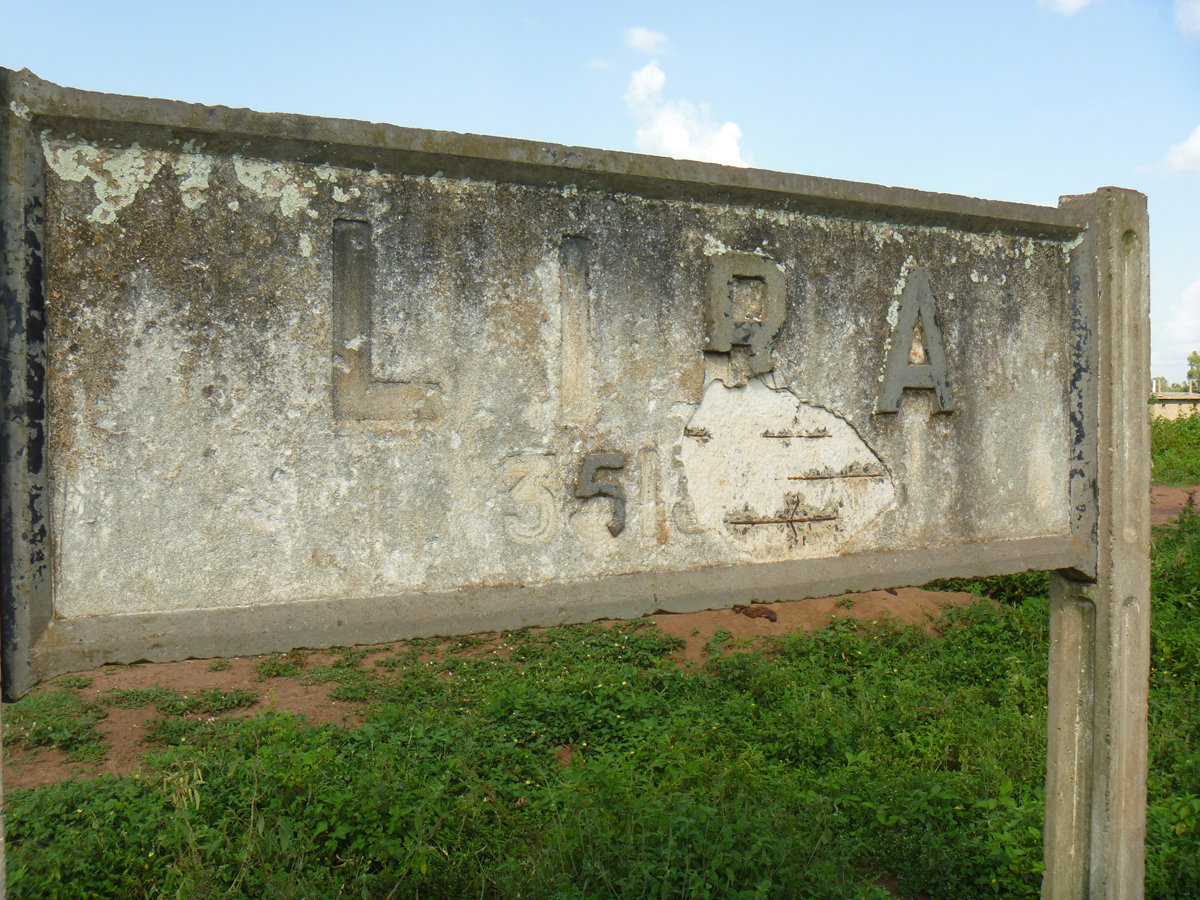
A dilapidated elevation sign at Lira, Uganda, September 2010.

Lira District is a district in Northern Uganda. Like many other Ugandan districts, it is named after its 'chief town', Lira.

== Location ==
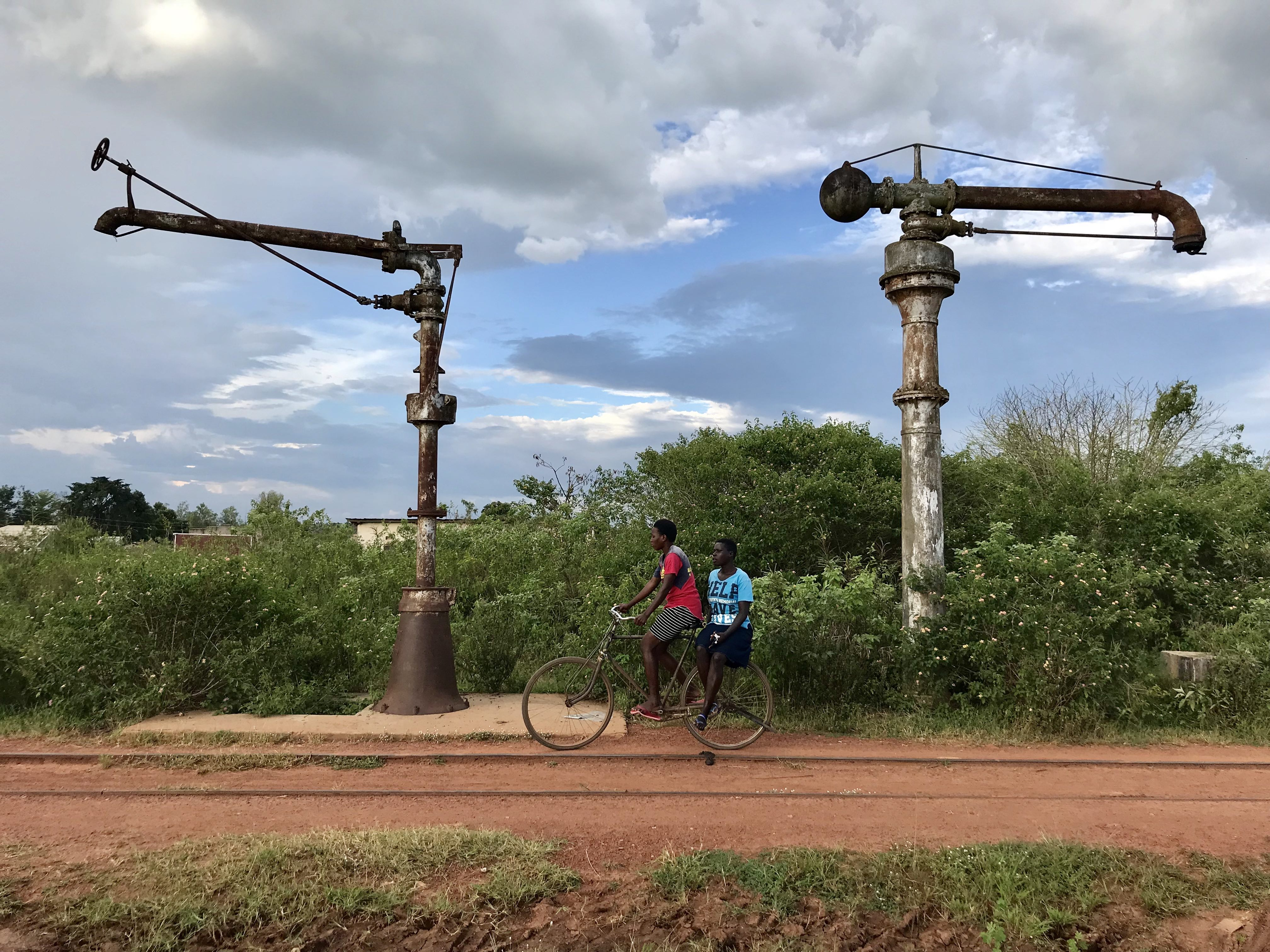
Cycling along the train tracks.

Lira District is bordered by Pader District to the north, Otuke District to the northeast, Alebtong District to the east, Dokolo District to the southeast, Apac District to the southwest and Kole District to the west. The main municipal, administrative and commercial center in the district, Lira, is located 110 kilometres (68 mi), by road, southeast of Gulu, the largest city in Northern Uganda. The coordinates of the district are: 2° 16' 26" N / 32° 57' 11" E.

== Overview ==
Until 2005, the district comprised six counties; Erute, Dokolo, Kyoga, Otuke, Moroto and Lira Municipality. These were further subdivided into 28 sub-counties. Of the 28 sub-counties, four are Municipal Divisions. There are a total of 192 parishes with 2,247 villages. With Dokolo becoming a district in 2005, Alebtong and Otuke in 2010, Lira District now consists of three counties: Erute North County, Erute South County and Lira Municipality.

== Conflict and displacement ==
Long untouched by the Lord's Resistance Army insurgency that ravaged Kitgum and Pader Districts to the north, the increased violence of 2002 resulted in massive population displacement within the district of Lira. However, as of June 2009, the security situation in the district was relatively peaceful. In 2006 and 2007, Lira District experienced a massive return of Internally Displaced Persons. Over 310,000 of the estimated 350,000 left camps to return to their home villages in a period of 14 months.

== Lango sub-region ==
Lira District is part of Lango sub-region, which consists of the following districts: Alebtong, Amolatar, Apac, Dokolo, Lira, Kole, Otuke and Oyam. The sub-region is coterminous with the now defunct Lango District. Lango sub-region was home to an estimated 2.5 million Langi in 2023, according to the national census conducted at that time.

== Population ==
The 1991 census estimated the population in the district at about 191,500. The 2002 national census put the district population at about 290,600, with an annual population growth rate of 3.4%. In 2012, the population of Lira District was estimated at 403,100. The majority of the population are ethnic Lango and the predominant language spoken is Lango.

== Economic activity ==
Lira District has a diversified economy including:

1. Grain Milling
2. Wholesale and retail sales
3. Leisure industry
4. Brick making
5. Pottery
6. Roof tile making
7. Carpentry
8. Logging
9. Construction
10. Fishing
11. Embroidery
12. Crop processing & marketing
13. Metal repairs & fabrication
14. Printing services
15. Bookshop business
16. Boda-boda business
17. Pharmaceutical sales

== Livestock kept by the population include the following: ==
- Cattle
- chicken
- Goats
- Sheep
- Pigs
- Guinea Fowl
- Ducks
- Pigeons

== See also ==
- Lango sub-region
- Northern Region, Uganda
- Districts of Uganda
- Lira University
- Lira Hospital
- Akii Bua Stadium
