= Lango sub-region =

Sub-region in Uganda

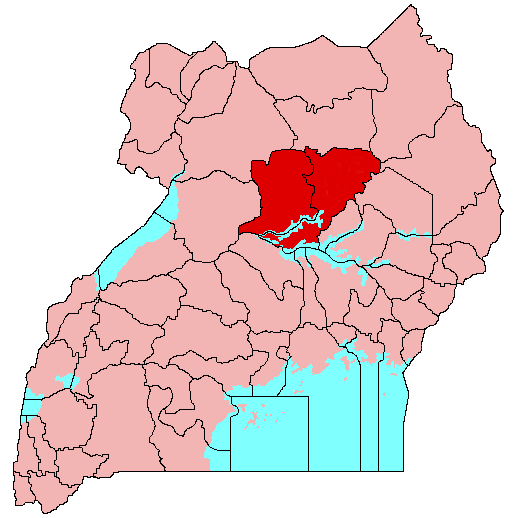
Lango Sub-region

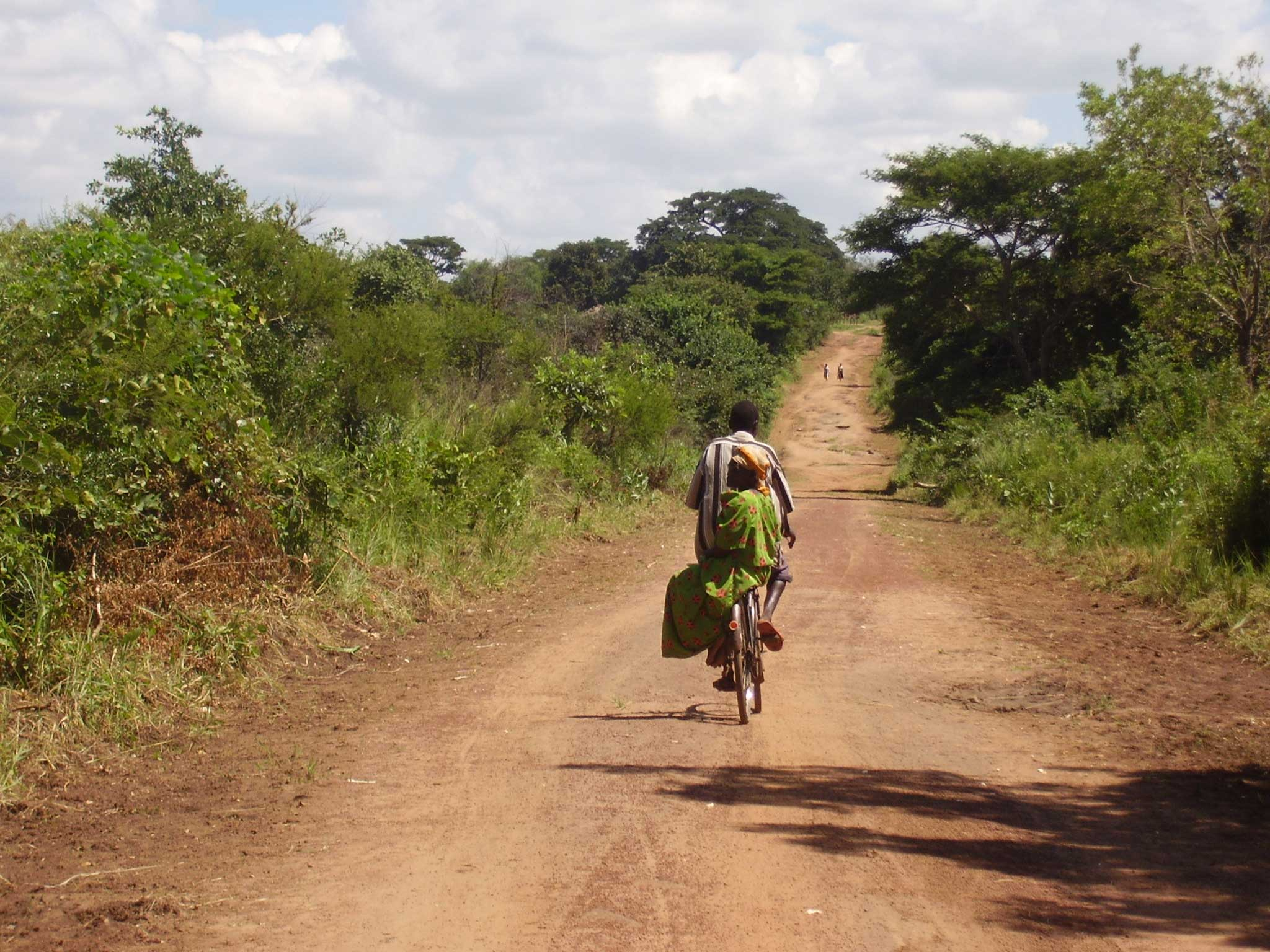
A road in rural Lango

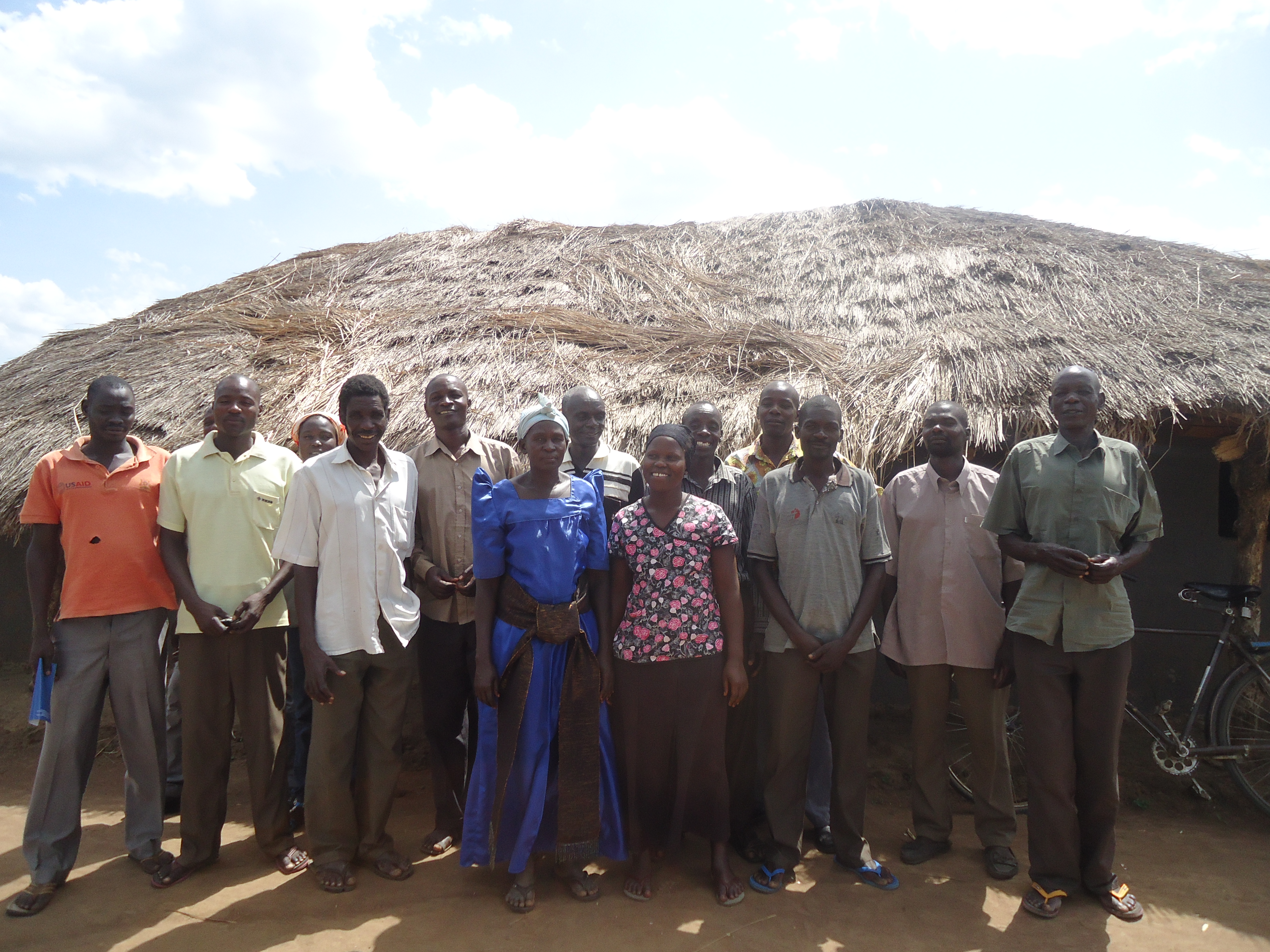
Community leaders in Lango

Lango sub-region is a region in Uganda that was initially covering only two districts (Lira formed in 1974 with its sister Apac) but later divided of many districts and one city covering an area of 15,570.7km consisting of the districts of:

- Alebtong
- Amolatar
- Apac
- Dokolo
- Kole
- Lira
- Lira city
- Oyam
- Otuke
- Kwania

== Coverage ==
It covers the area previously known as Lango District until 1974, when it was split into the districts of Apac and Lira, and subsequently into several other districts. The sub-region is home mainly to the Lango ethnic group. Lango sub-region is home to Dr. Apollo Milton Obote, a former president that led Uganda to independence in 1962, whose ancestral home and monument acts as a national heritage site managed by Uganda Tourism Board.

At the 2002 national census, it had a population of about 1.5 million people. As of July 2018, its population was an estimated 2.3 million, about 5.75% of the estimated 40 million Ugandans at the time.

== Leadership ==
Lango sub-region is headed by a paramount chief, also known as "Won Nyaci" and is elected by a council of elders from different clans in Lango. The newly elected chief is Odongo Okune who took office even before the death of Yosam Odur Ibii, former Lango chief.

== Geography ==
Lango lies in north-central Uganda, about 230 km by road north of Kampala. The area includes wetlands and lakes associated with the Lake Kyoga basin, including Lake Kwania in parts of Dokolo District.

== Administrative divisions ==
Uganda Investment Authority describes Lango as comprising nine districts: Alebtong, Amolatar, Apac, Dokolo, Kole, Kwania, Lira, Otuke, Oyam.

== Demographics ==
The Uganda Bureau of Statistics reported a 2014 to 2024 average annual growth rate of 2.3% for Lango sub-region.

== Population ==
Lango sub-region has a population of around 5,372,431 persons during the 2024 national census with total households population of 2,522,856 and 575,559 number of households indicating 9.33 persons per household which is absolutely abnormal.

According to the 2014 national population census, the region had a population of 2,061,694 with females constituting at least 50% for each district, while Lira District was the most populous, with 408,043 residents.

DISTRICT	FEMALES	MALES	TOTAL	% FEMALE	% MALE
APAC	187,631	180,995	368,626	50.90009929	49.0999
LIRA	211,380	196,663	408,043	51.80336386	48.19664
AMOLATAR	74,152	73,014	147,166	50.38663822	49.61336
DOKOLO	93,617	89,476	183,093	51.13084607	48.86915
OYAM	196,523	187,121	383,644	51.22535476	48.77465
ALEBTONG	116,552	110,989	227,541	51.22241706	48.77758
KOLE	122,163	117,164	239,327	51.04438697	48.95561
OTUKE	53,067	51,187	104,254	50.90164406	49.09836
HIGHLY POPULATED	211,380	196,663	408,043	51.80336386	49.613362
LOWLY POPULATED	53,067	51,187	104,254	50.38663822	48.196636

== Economy ==
Lango’s economy is strongly linked to crop farming and livestock production, within annual cropping and cattle-farming systems common across Northern Uganda. Trade and services play a major role in urban centres such as Lira and Apac.

== Language ==
The main local language is Lango, also known as Leb Lango, a Western Nilotic language with ISO 639-3 code “laj”.

== Infrastructure ==
Central government has cited upgrades to key roads in Lango, including the Kamdini to Lira corridor, as part of wider infrastructure work in Northern Uganda.

== See also ==
- Districts of Uganda
- Lango People
