= Alebtong District =

- District
- District location in Uganda
- Coordinates: 02°18′N 33°18′E
- Country: Uganda
- Region: Northern Region of Uganda
- Sub-region: Lango sub-region
- Capital: Alebtong

Area
  - Total: 1,527.5 km^{2} (589.8 sq mi)
- Elevation: 1,100 m (3,600 ft)

Population (2014 Census)
  - Total: 225,327
  - Density: 148/km^{2} (380/sq mi)
- Time zone: UTC+3 (EAT)
- Website: www.alebtong.go.ug

Alebtong District is a district in the Northern Region of Uganda. The town of Alebtong serves as the district headquarters.

== Location ==
Alebtong District is located in the Lango sub-region. The distance between Kampala to Alebtong Northern Region via Lira is 367 Km by road, Approximately 6hr Road Drive. The district is bordered by Otuke District to the north, Amuria District to the east, Dokolo District to the south, and Lira District to the west. The district headquarters are approximately 48 kilometres (30 mi), by road, east of Lira, the largest city in the sub-region. This is approximately 285 kilometres (177 mi), by road, north of Kampala, Uganda's capital and largest city. The coordinates of the district are 02 18N, 33 18E.

== Overview ==
Alebtong District was formed in 2010. Before then, it was part of Lira District on the West Side. The district is made up of two counties, namely Ajuri County and Moroto County.

== Population ==
In 1991, the national population census estimated the population of the district at 112,584. The 2002 national census estimated the population to be 163,047. The 2014 national population census enumerated the population at 225,327. The Alebtong District population was recorded at 283,076 people in the 2024 National Population and Housing Census.

== Economic activity ==
- Sweet potatoes
- Maize
- Beans
- Fishing
- Livestock Farming
- Local market business

== Livestock kept by the population ==
- Cattle
- Goat
- Pigs
- Poutry

== See also ==
- Districts of Uganda
- Northern Region, Uganda
- Parliament of Uganda
- Alebtong
