= John Babiiha =

Ugandan politician and farmer

- Born: 17 April 1913
- Died: March 1982 (aged 68)
- Education: Makerere University College
- Occupations: Politician and farmer

John Babiiha (17 April 1913 – March 1982) was a Ugandan politician, rancher and farmer. He was Uganda's first Republican Vice President under the Uganda People's Congress which was led by Apollo Milton Obote. He also served as the Minister of Animal Resources under Milton Obote. He is believed to have founded the Uganda People's Congress Party in 1959 with Obote, Sam Odaka and Felix Rwambarari.

== Background and education ==
Babiiha was born on 17 April 1913 in Kabarole (today Fort Portal, the capital of the Toro Kingdom, located in Western Uganda.

Babiiha studied at St Joseph's College, Mbarara and St Mary's College, Kisubi. He later on got a scholarship to Makerere University College, where he attained a diploma in veterinary science.

== Career ==
Babiiha started work as a veterinary officer from 1939 until 1946, when he joined the Toro kingdom government, as secretary and then assistant treasurer to the local parliament.

Babiiha 1954 he was nominated by the Toro parliament to the Uganda Legislative Council. He stood for Parliament for Toro Central in the first elections in 1958, as leader of his own Uganda Peoples' Union Party and again in the general election of March 1961, winning his seat both times. Babiiha then merged his party with others to join the Uganda Peoples' Congress of Milton Obote in 1960; he then became national chairman of the party. Obote gave him a place in his first cabinet in October 1962, at the time of independence, as Minister of Animal Husbandry, Game and Fisheries.

Babiiha also served as Uganda's first republican Vice President after the abolition of traditional institutions in 1967.

== Political life ==
Babiiha temporarily assumed control of government and declared a national state of emergency on 19 December 1969, when the Uganda People's Congress party president and the then President of Uganda Milton Obote got injured in an attempted assassination.

== Death ==
After the military coup in 1971, Babiiha retired immediately to his farms. His only public function in the two years which followed was when Idi Amin, President of Uganda, sent him on a world goodwill mission in January, 1973. Babiiha died in March 1982 and was buried at his home in Kibimba village, Fort Portal municipality.

== See also ==
- William Gabula
- Paulo Muwanga
