= Lira, Uganda =

Lira
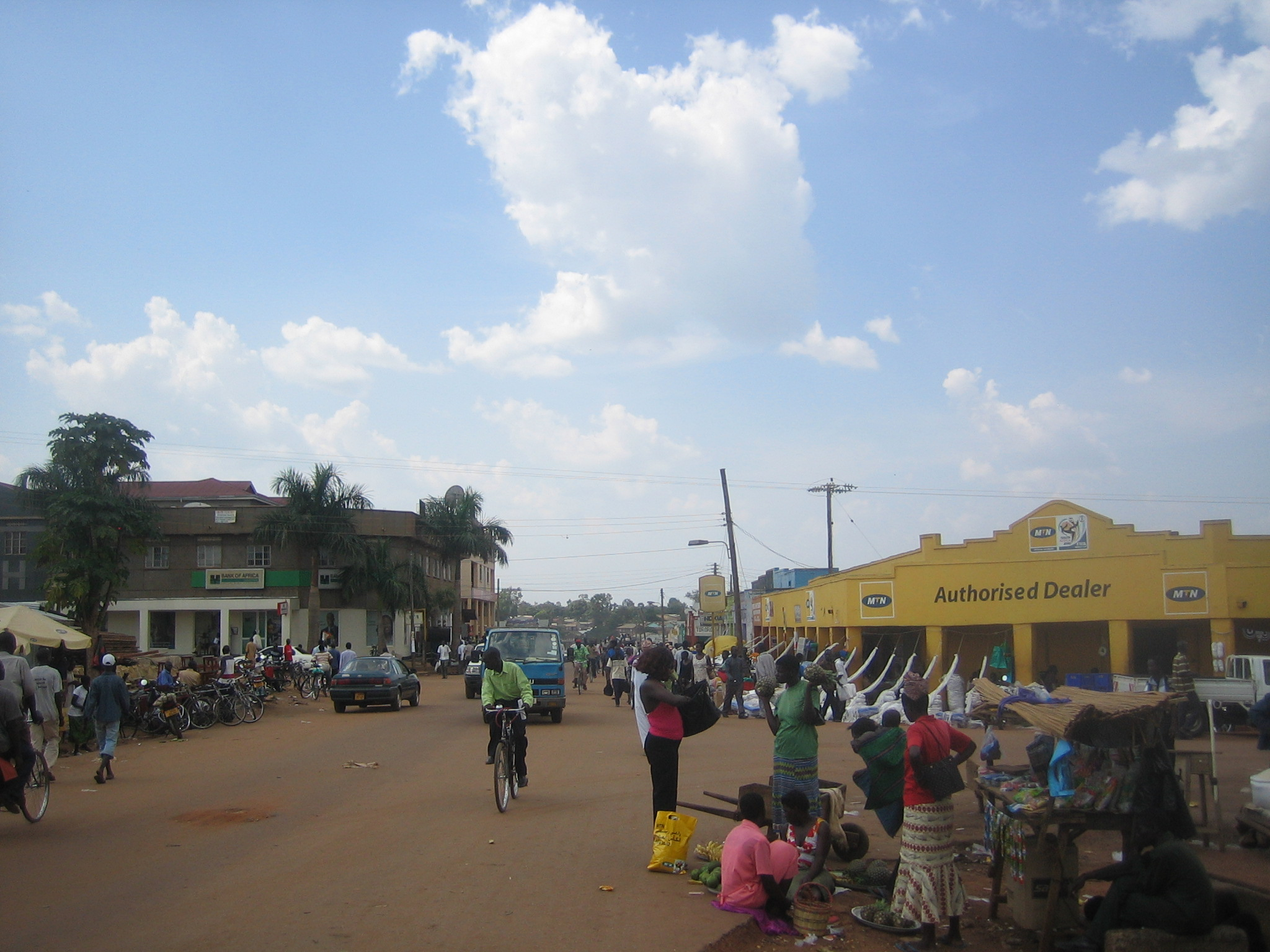

- Location in Uganda
- Coordinates: 02°14′50″N 32°54′00″E
- Country: Uganda
- Region: Northern Region of Uganda
- Sub-region: Lango sub-region
- District: Lira District
- Founded: 1919
- Town Council: 1962
- Municipality: 1985
- City: 2020

Government
  - Mayor: Sam Atul
- Elevation: 3,488 ft (1,063 m)

Population (2024 Census)
  - Total: 245,132

Lira is a city in the Northern Region of Uganda. It serves as the main urban center of the Lango sub-region. On 1 July 2020, Lira was officially elevated to city status as part of Uganda's government plan to create new cities across the country. Following this elevation, Lira City became a separate administrative entity distinct from Lira District.

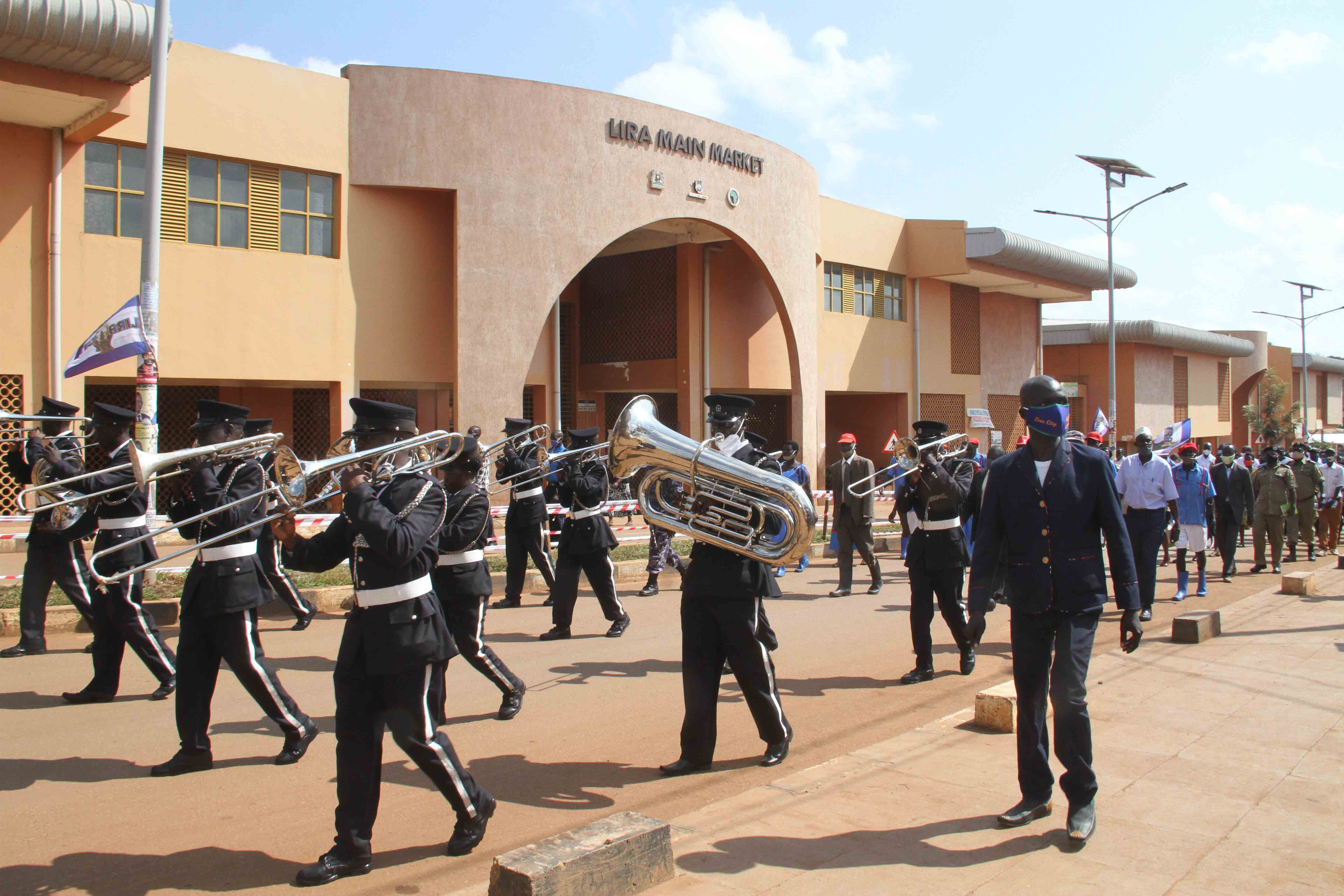
Lira main market

== History ==
Lira is the oldest district in Lango sub-region that was formed in 1974 with Lango ethnic group as the main occupants. Lira was one of the last towns in Uganda held by loyalists of Idi Amin during the Uganda–Tanzania War (1978–1979). A force consisting of the Tanzania People's Defence Force's 201st Brigade and the Uganda National Liberation Front's Kikosi Maalum attacked Lira on 15 May 1979, ousting the Amin loyalists after a short battle. The clash at Lira was the last important battle of the Uganda–Tanzania War, as the remnants of Amin's army completely disintegrated thereafter.

== Location ==
Lira is approximately 100 kilometres (62 mi), by road, southeast of Gulu, the largest city in the Northern Region of Uganda, along the highway between Gulu and Mbale. This is approximately 124 kilometres (77 mi) northwest of Soroti, the nearest city to the south.

Lira City is located approximately 337 kilometres (209 mi), by road, north of the city of Kampala, the capital and largest city in the country. The coordinates of Lira City are 2°14'50.0"N 32°54'00.0"E (Latitude:02.2472; Longitude:32.9000). The city lies at an average elevation of 1,063 metres (3,488 ft), above sea level.

== Population ==
The 2002 national census estimated the population of Lira at 80,900. In 2010, the Uganda Bureau of Statistics (UBOS) estimated the population at 105,100. In 2011, UBOS estimated the mid-year population at 108,600. The 2014 census put the population at 99,059. The Night Population of Lira City Population is projected (Midyear 2020) from the 2014 National Population and Housing Census (NPHC) is 249,900. The day population is projected at 500,000. In 2024, the national census put the population of Lira at 245,132.

During the 2024's National population census, Lira city has an approximately 241,020 household population.and 61,847 total households

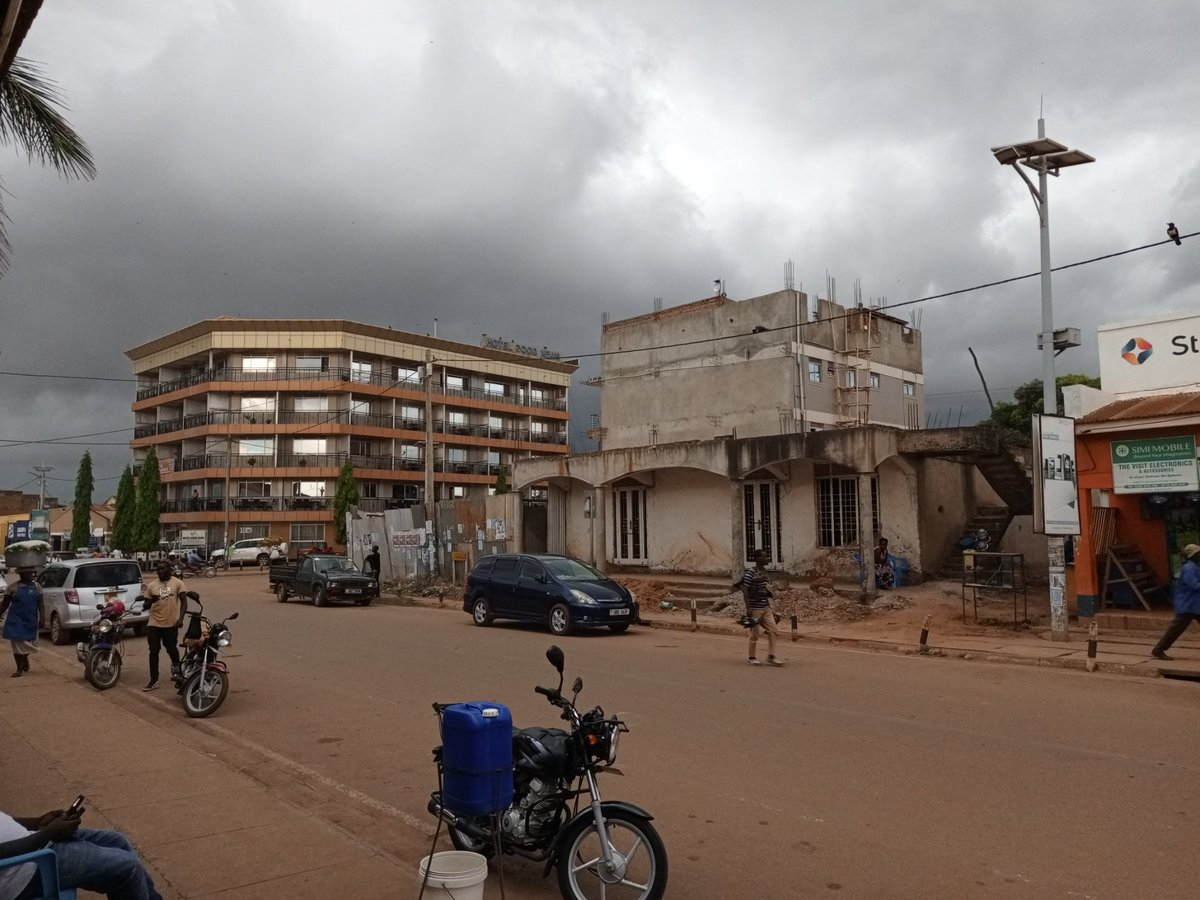
Lira City

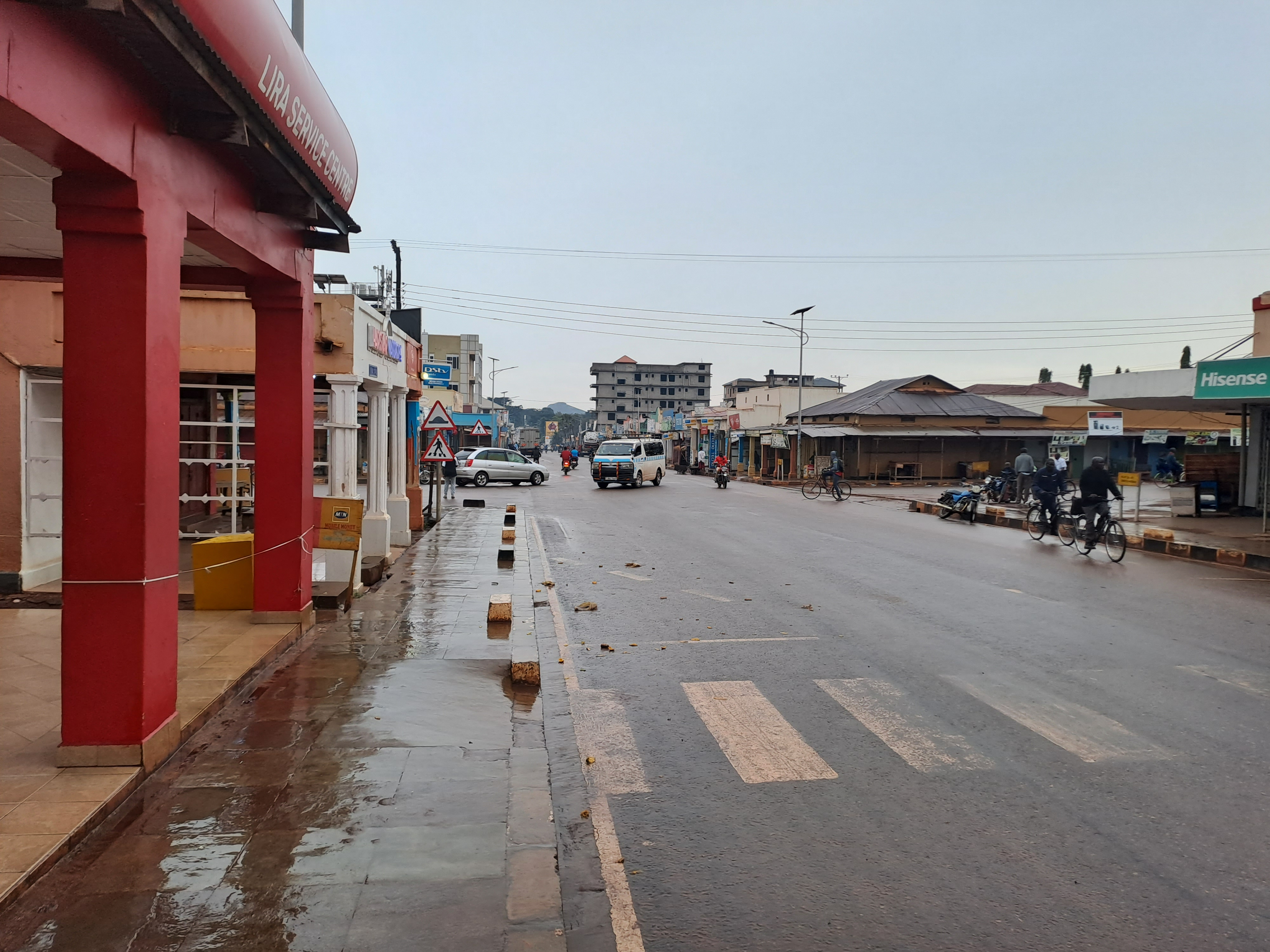
Lira City Lira District

== Economy ==
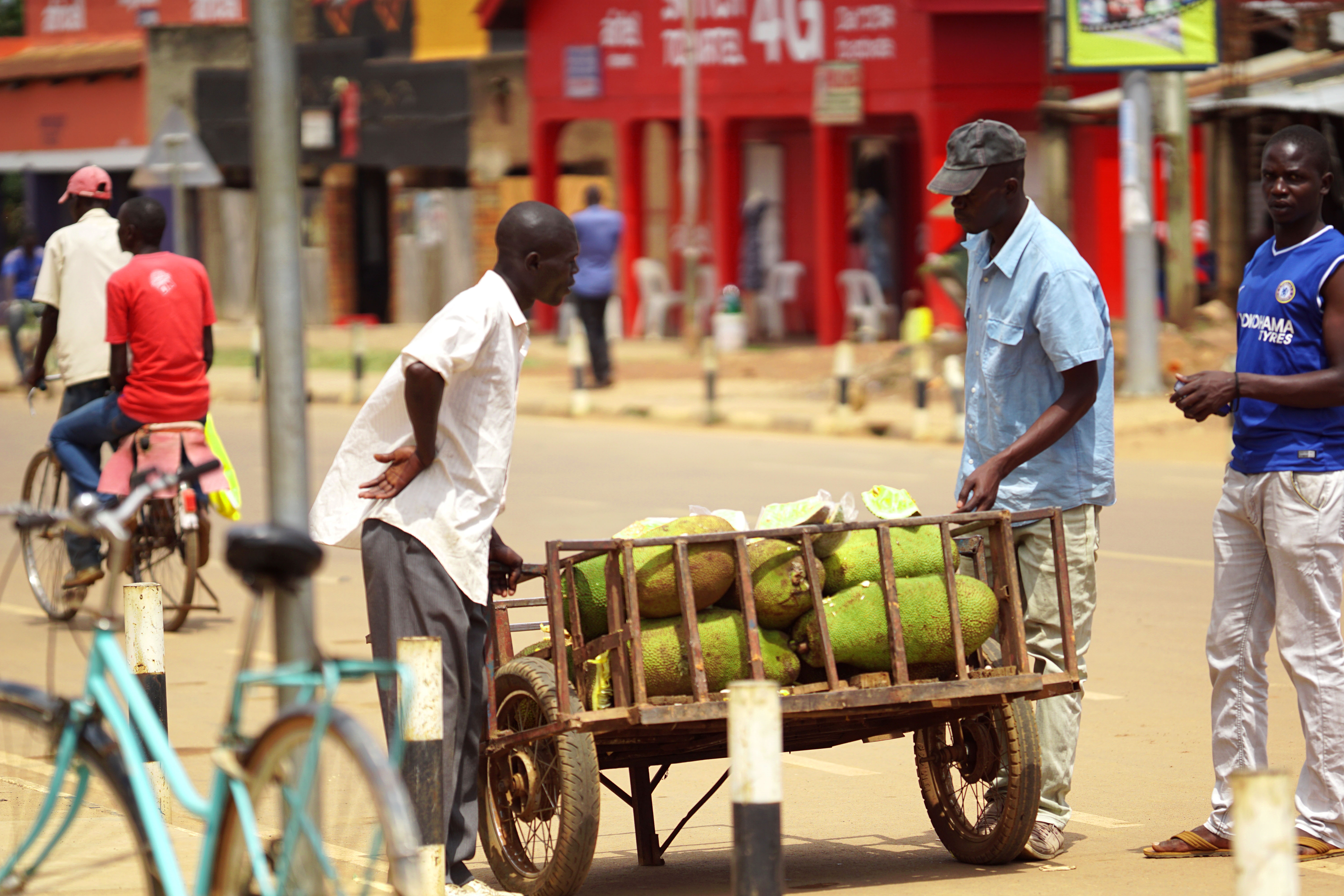
A man selling jackfruit along the road in Lira, Uganda

Lira City serves as the primary business hub in Northern Uganda and has been baptized as the "Commercial and Industrial City" of the region. The economy is characterized by a diverse mix of industrial, commercial, and agricultural activities.

=== Industrial sector ===
The city hosts several significant industries, including:

- Mukwano Industries - a major manufacturer of consumer goods including cooking oil, soaps, and other household products
- Meru Millers - a large-scale grain processing facility that mills maize and other cereals
- Various other manufacturing and processing plants that contribute to the local economy

=== Commercial sector ===
The city's economy is predominantly based on commerce, serving as a central market and distribution point for agricultural products from the surrounding rural areas. Major economic activities include:

- Trade in agricultural products (grains, legumes, and other produce)
- Retail and wholesale commerce
- Service industry
- Transportation and logistics

The city hosts several markets, including the Main Market (Lira Central Market), which is one of the largest in Northern Uganda, attracting traders and customers from across the region.

=== Agriculture ===
Agriculture remains an important economic driver, with the city functioning as a collection and distribution center for agricultural products from the fertile surrounding regions of the Lango sub-region.

Agriculture in Lira District is largely smallholder and rain-fed. Major food crops include cassava, maize, sorghum, millet, beans, and groundnuts, while sunflower, sesame (sim sim), and soybeans are important cash crops. Other crops grown in the district include rice, sweet potatoes, pigeon peas, and fruits such as mangoes and oranges.

== Transport ==
Lira is served by a railway station of the Uganda Railways network. The city is also served by a public civilian airport, Lira Airport, administered by the Civil Aviation Authority of Uganda.

== Power line ==
An 80-kilometre (50 mi) 132-kilovolt electricity line from the Karuma Power Station is under construction to a substation in Lira, under the supervision of Intec Gopa International Energy Consultants GmbH of Germany.

== Points of interest ==
The following additional points of interest lie within the town limits or close to the edges of the city:

- Offices of Lira City Council
- Lira Main Market
- Ngetta Rock
- Mount Meru Millers
- Mukwano Industries Lira factory
- Lira University, a public university in Uganda
- Lira Campus of Uganda Martyrs University, a private university, whose main campus is located in Nkozi, Mpigi District
- All Saints University, a private university affiliated with the Church of Uganda
- A branch of the National Social Security Fund
- Ministry of Water and Environment Upper Nile region branch
- Lira Integrated School, a mixed, residential, nursery, primary and secondary school
- Secondary schools include the following public schools: Lango College, Comboni College, Dr. Obote College, St. Katherine Girls School.
- Lira Town College, a secondary school
- Accommodation facilities include Good news hotel, Lira Hotel, Pacific Grand Hotel, Pauline Hotel and several others.
- A golf course next to Lira Central Primary School
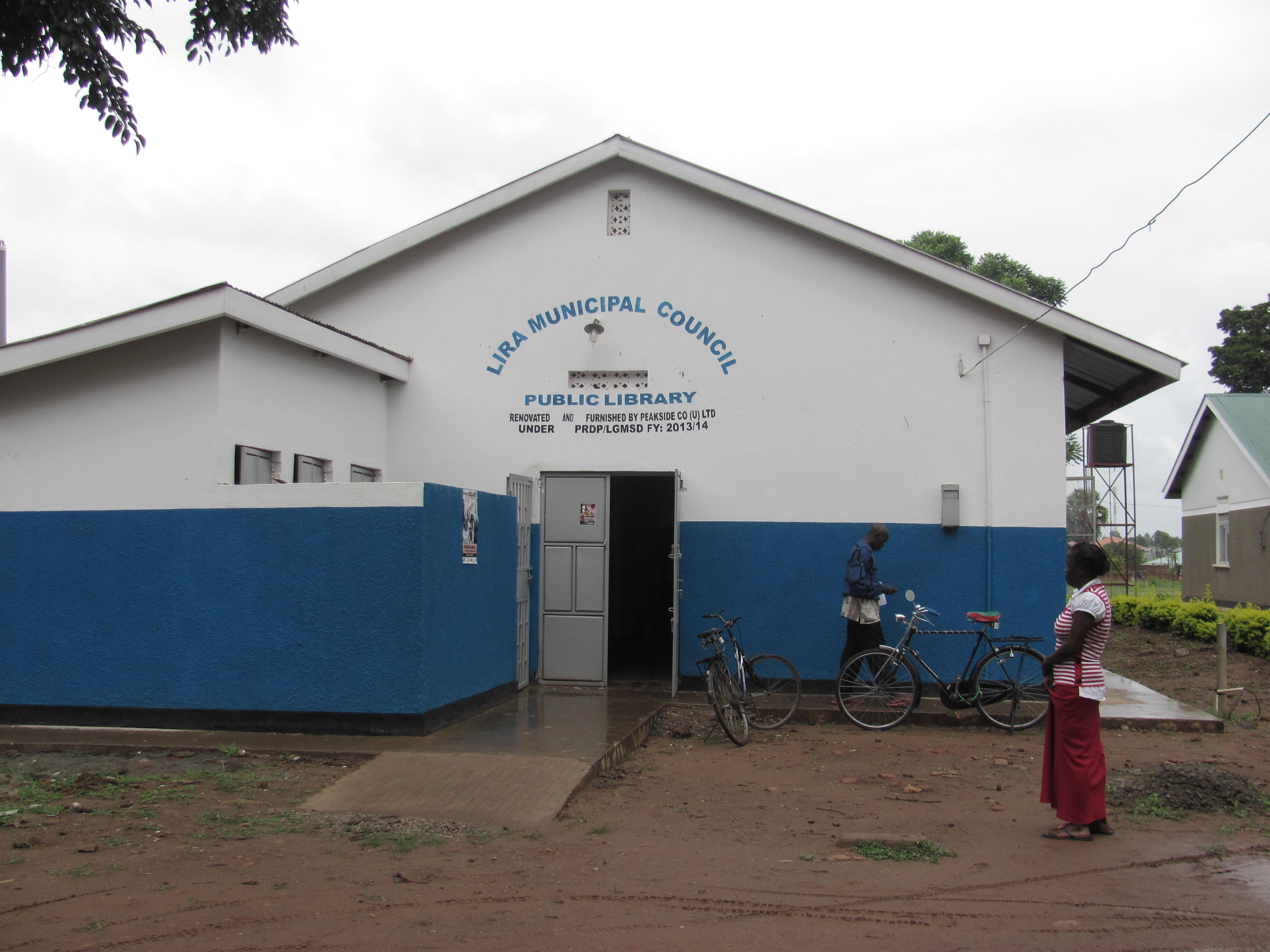
- Lira Public Library front view
  Lira regional referral hospital, a government facility

== Notable people ==
- David Oyite Ojok, former major general, liberator and UNLA Chief of Staff
- Dusman Sabuni, military officer and rebel leader
- Milton Obote, 2nd President of Uganda
- John Akii Bua, athlete

== See also ==
- Lango people
- Lira University
- Gulu City
- Arua City
