= General Assembly of Lango =

- Emblem of Lango

Type
- Type: Unicameral

Leadership
- Speaker: Willy Omodo Omodo

Structure
- Seats: 175
- Political groups: His Royal Highness's Government (25): Prime Minister and Ministers (25); Council of Owitong (149): Clan Chiefs (149); Presiding Officer: Speaker (1)

Elections
- Voting system: Election and Appointment by the Won Nyaci

Meeting place
- Lango Cultural Centre; Lira, Uganda

The General Assembly of Lango is the legislature of the Lango Kingdom, one of the seventeen officially recognised traditional kingdoms in Uganda.

The General Assembly consists of the Council of Owitong, who are the elected chiefs of the 149 clans within the Kingdom, as well as the Prime Minister and the 24 other ministers of the Lango government. The General Assembly is charged with legislating by-laws, legislating on cultural matters, scrutinising the royal government and passing the kingdom's yearly budget. As a cultural legislature, it is prevented from legislating on political matters.

At present the General Assembly meets outside, at the Lango Cultural Centre in Lira, the capital of Lango. A new and permanent venue for the General Assembly is due to be constructed alongside the new Lango Royal Palace.
