= Patrick Ocan =

Ugandan politician

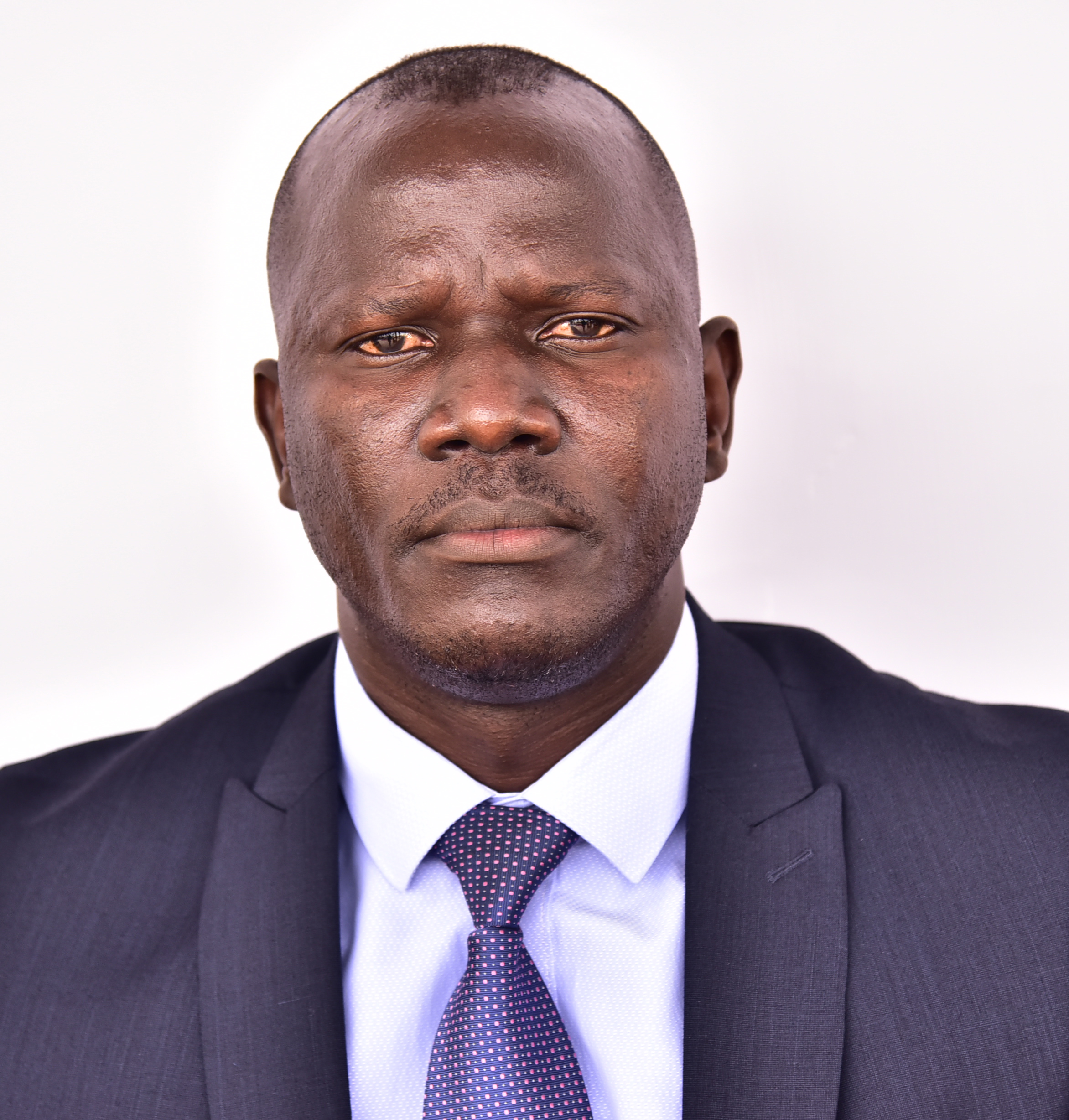

Member of Ugandan Parliament

Honourable
- In office 2021–2026
- Preceded by: Office established
- Constituency: Apac Municipality

Personal details
- Born: April 24, 1978 (age 48)
- Party: Ugandan People's Congress
- Education: Makerere University

Patrick Ocan (born April 24, 1978) is a Ugandan economist and politician and a former Member of Parliament who represented the Apac Municipality for the Ugandan People's Congress (UPC) in the eleventh elections of 2021-2026.

== Life and education ==
Ocan attended Makerere University where he graduated with a Bachelor's degree in Qualitative Economics.

== Political career ==
Ocan was elected to the Ugandan Parliament to represent Apac District in 2018 on the platform of UPC scoring 6,597 votes. After his victory, Centenary Bank resumed a 12-year fraud case against Ocan, leading to his arrest. He was accused of defrauding the bank of 25 million Uganda shillings after the money was discovered missing from the bank's treasury. Ocan denied the allegation, stating that the bank was defrauded when a customer brought in fake dollar bills for exchange which he accepted without discovering it.

Ocan was removed from his seat in parliament along with five other legislators in December 2019 by the Constitutional Court of Uganda. This was the ruling of a case filed by a former Bufumbira East MP, Eddie Kwizera. The case had challenged the legality of the six constituencies including Apac District created after 2016 elections. The court declared all six constituencies null and void.

In 2025, Ocan announced his intention to contest as independent candidate in the 2026 eleventh elections following his expulsion from UPC. He made the announcement during a three-day training program for widows organized by the NGO of the St. Thomas church of Uganda in Apac.

== See also ==
- List of members of the tenth Parliament of Uganda
- Maxwell Akora
- Yovan Adriko
- Uganda People's Congress
- List of members of the eleventh Parliament of Uganda
