= Mudoko dako =

Langi and Ugandan third gender

A mudoko dako (also known as mudoko daka or dano mulokere) is an effeminate male who is considered by Langi society to be a different gender, though were mostly treated as woman among the Langi in Uganda. Mudoko dako also could be found among the Teso and the Karamojong people. Recognition of the mudoko dako can be traced back prior to colonialism in Africa.

Mudoko dako was considered an "alternative gender status" and were able to marry men with no social sanctions. The word, dako, in the Lango language means "woman". In his work, The Lango: A Nilotic Tribe of Uganda (1923), anthropologist Jack Herbert Driberg describes the mudoko dako people among the Langi. Driberg describes how men, known as Jo Apele or Jo Aboich, go on to become mudoko dako, dressing in the manner of women and taking on women's traditional roles. Driberg even observed mudoko dako simulating menstruation.
