= Maxwell Akora =

Ugandan politician

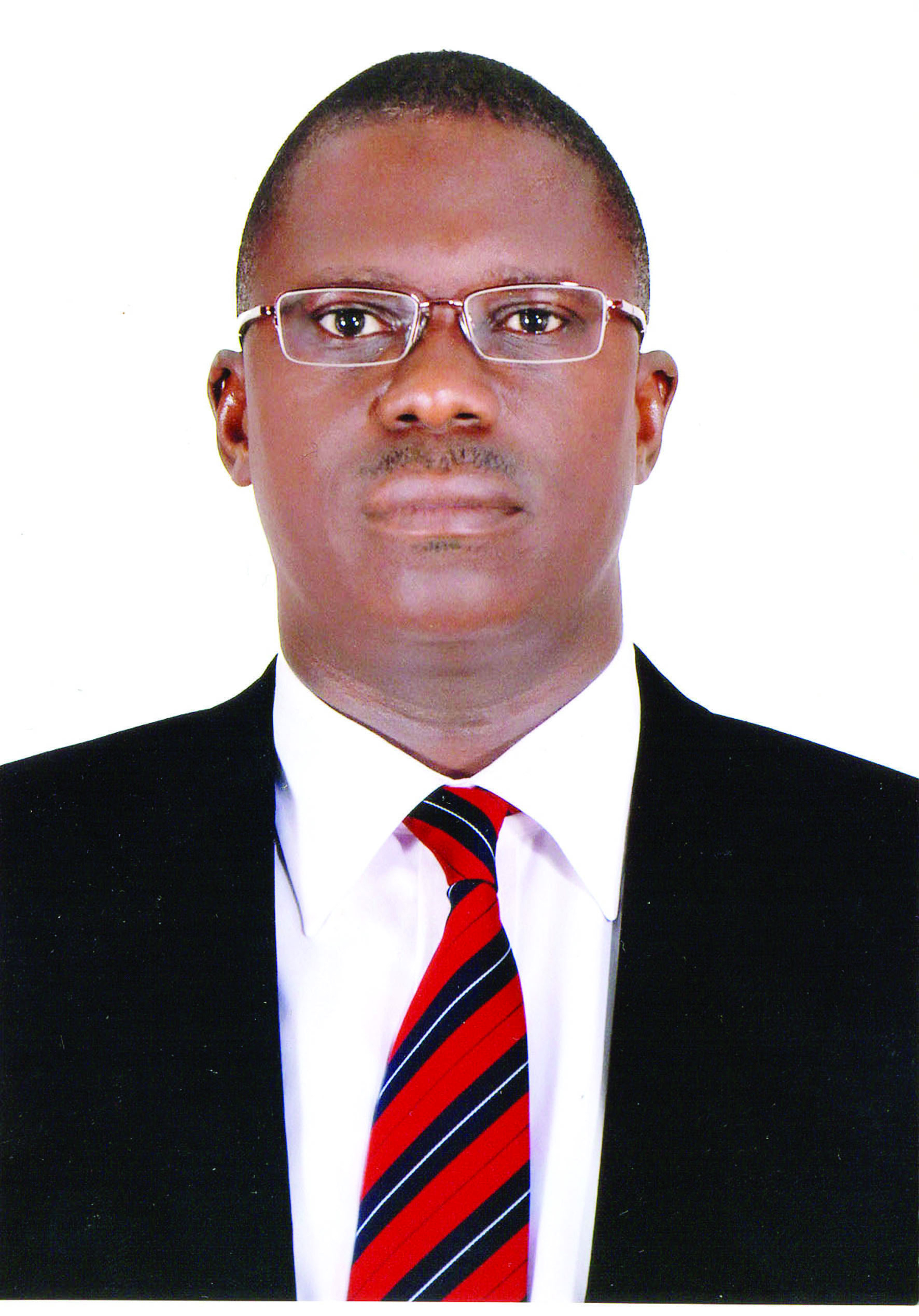

Member of 11th Parliament of Uganda from Apac District
- Incumbent
- Assumed office 2021

Personal details
- Born: 31 August 1965 (age 61)
- Party: Uganda People's Congress
- Education: Makerere University
- Religion: Anglican Church

Maxwell Ebong Patrick Akora (born 31 August 1965) is a Ugandan politician and a member of the parliament representing Maruzi county in Apac District on the ticket of Uganda People's Congress (UPC).

== Life and education ==
Akora is a Christian of Anglican denomination. He earned a bachelor's degree in commerce from Makerere University and a master's degree in Business Administration from the University of Cumbria. In 2019, he previously worked within the justice, Law and order Sector Secretariat and Ministry of Justice and Constitutional Affairs. Akora declared himself as the Oyima clan head with media commercials announcing his installation but the clan elders disowned him cautioning clan members not to attend the ceremony.

== Political career ==
Akora was elected to the parliament representing Maruzi County on the platform of UPC. He serves on the committees of Information Communication and Technology, Finance, and Planning, and Economic Development. He was appointed into the sectoral committee as Vice Chairperson of the Information and Communications Technology (ICT) committee, as a deputy to Tororo North MP, Annet Nyakecho. The members of his political party, UPC in the parliament protested this appointment as the position is reserved for the ruling party in party parliament.

In March 2025, Maxwell stated that he plans to seek election as a member of Parliament for Apac Municipality in 2026. The decision would see him contest the seat currently held by Patrick Ocan, both individuals are affiliated with the Uganda Peoples Congress.

== See also ==
- List of members of the eleventh Parliament of Uganda
- Patrick Ocan
- Uganda People's Congress
