= Sarah Aguti Nyangkori =

Member of Parliament for Dokolo District

Sarah Aguti
- Born: Sarah Aguti Nyangkori
- Education: Uganda Christian University
- Known for: Woman Member of Parliament for Dokolo District
- Political party: Uganda People's Congress

Sarah Aguti Nyangkori is a Ugandan social worker and legislator. She is a woman MP in the eleventh parliament representing Dokolo district affiliated to Uganda People's Congress.

== Education ==
Sarah graduated from Uganda Christian University with a bachelor's degree of social works and social administration.

== Political career ==
In 2021, Aguti contested for the woman MP seat for Dokolo district and lost to Cecilia Ogwal who got 32,223 votes compared to her 10,460 votes.

Aguti was declared the flag bearer for UPC on 19 February 2024 during the party district conference at Dokolo catholic parish, after other two party members withdrawn their interests. On 11 March 2024, she was put forward by UPC party to contest for the Woman MP by-election for Dokolo district.

Aguti won the by-election for woman MP for Dokolo district which took place on 21 March 2024 with 23,044 votes, after the seat became vacant following the death of Cecilia Ogwal on 18 January 2024.

== See also ==
- List of members of the eleventh parliament of Uganda
- Cecilia Ogwal
