= Paul Amoru =

Ugandan politician

Honorable

Personal details
- Born: Paul Amoru; 11 October 1983 (age 42) Dokolo, Uganda
- Citizenship: Uganda
- Education: Uganda Christian University (Bachelor of Arts in Mass Communication)
- Occupation: Journalist, politician
- Known for: Journalism, politics

Paul Omiat Amoru (born 11 October 1983) is a Ugandan journalist, public speaker, and politician. He is the High Commissioner of the Republic of Uganda to the Republic of South Africa in Pretoria He is a former Member of Parliament for Dokolo North County (2016-2021) and a representative of the National Resistance Movement (NRM), the ruling political party in Uganda.

Amoru was the chairperson of the Uganda Parliamentary Forum on Media, the spokesperson for Lango Parliamentary Group, the NRM whip for Lango members of parliament and the NRM chairperson for Dokolo North County. He was a member of the Committee on Equal Opportunities and the Committee on Education & Sports in the 10th Parliament of Uganda.

In 2005, Amoru was elected guild president of Uganda Christian University and subsequently served as president of Uganda National Students Association (UNSA) in 2006. He was the founding president of Uganda Christian University Media Link in 2004 and a founding member of Uganda Christian University HIV / AIDS Initiative in 2006.

He formerly worked as a Public Relations Officer for Kumi University, a Deputy News Editor for Monitor Publications Limited (MPL) and a Senior Information and Communication Officer for Uganda Business and Technical Examinations Board (UBTEB). He is the chairman board of trustees for UNSA and previously served on the same board as the deputy chairperson for the national students’ body.

== Early life and education ==
Amoru was born in Dokolo District, Lango sub-region, on 11 October 1983 in an Anglican family of the Langi people. The second-born of eight children, he attained his primary education while schooling in his home district of Lira at the time when the Lord's Resistance Army insurgency in the region was at its peak. He attended Angwechibange Primary School, Dokolo Primary School and Lira Faith Academy.

In spite of the hardships, Amoru made it to Ngora High School where he attained both his O-level and A-Level academic qualifications. He was a library prefect in O-level and in A-level, a UNSA representative for Ngora High School and the UNSA chairperson for Kumi District.

Amoru further advanced to Uganda Christian University (UCU) for his university education where he attained a Bachelor of Arts degree in Mass Communication, majoring in Public Relations. At UCU, he was elected president of the students’ guild in 2005 and went on to serve as president of Uganda National Students Association (UNSA) in 2006. Over the years, Amoru has been exposed to and involved in several professional trainings and fellowship programmes in the field of journalism.

In 2007-2008 he went to Nairobi Kenya and attained a Certificate in Specialized Media Practice and Management – NMG Media Lab Editorial Training Programme

In 2017 he attained a Masters’ Degree in Journalism and Communications from Makerere University

In 2018 - 2019 he attained a Certificate in Media Regulation in a Democratic Framework from Fojo Media Institute/Linnaeus University, Global Reporting Sweden AB.

== Career ==
Amoru started his media practice as a public relations officer for the vocational institute, Adwoki Technical School in 2006 and then Kumi University in early 2007. In mid 2007, he joined MPL as a staff writer and court reporter for Daily Monitor. While doing his professional job for the media group, Amoru was promoted to bureau chief in 2009 and then to deputy news editor in 2011, a position he held until March 2012 when he landed his desired career at the time as a public relations officer for the then newly established business and technical examinations body, UBTEB.

In 2015 Amoru successfully joined elective politics, winning the NRM chairmanship for Dokolo North County and further going on to win the constituency on the NRM ticket in the 2016 general elections that ushered in the 10th Parliament for the Pearl of Africa.

In the 10th Parliament, Amoru was the chairperson of the Uganda Parliamentary Forum on Media, the spokesperson for Lango Parliamentary Group, the NRM whip for Lango members of parliament and the NRM chairperson for Dokolo North County. He was also a member of the Committee on Equal Opportunities and the Committee on Education & Sports.

He serves as the Executive Director Unipol Media Services and Unipol Energy Uganda Limited since 2017.

He is also the Chairman Board and Managing Director, Upendo Familia Investment Limited from 2019 to date.

He is Currently the High Commissioner of the Republic of Uganda to the Republic of South Africa.

== Articles and publications ==
Paul Amoru has written a number of articles and has been a part of several publications over the course of his journalistic career that include among others the following:

1. A new dawn or Acholi Kingdom
2. African nationals indicted by ICC
3. Africans seek alternative court to ICC, face challenges
4. ICC Gets New Evidence to Indict LRA's Kony
5. Cluster bombs conference on

== See also ==
- Dokolo District
