= Tororo–Opuyo–Lira High Voltage Power Line =

High voltage power line in Uganda

Location
- Country: Uganda
- Coordinates: 01°40′39″N 33°40′37″E
- General direction: South to North
- From: Tororo, Uganda
- Passes through: Mbale, Opuyo, Dokolo
- To: Lira, Uganda

Ownership information
- Owner: Government of Uganda
- Partners: African Development Bank
- Operator: Uganda Electricity Transmission Company Limited

Construction information
- Construction started: 2013
- Expected: 2017

Technical information
- Current type: AC
- Total length: 264 km (164 mi)
- AC voltage: 132kV
- No. of circuits: 2

The Tororo–Opuyo–Lira High Voltage Power Line is a high voltage electricity power line, connecting the high voltage substation at Tororo, to another high voltage substation at Lira, in Uganda.

== Location ==
The 132kV power line, begins at the 132kV substation at Tororo, in Tororo District, in the Eastern Region of Uganda. The line travels in a northerly direction through Mbale, to the Uganda Electricity Transmission Company Limited high voltage substation at Opuyo, outside of Soroti, in Soroti District. From there, it takes a general north-westerly course, through Dokolo District, to end at Lira, in Lira District, in the Northern Region of Uganda, a total distance of approximately 264 kilometres (164 mi).

== Overview ==
The power line is the major electricity conduit to the Eastern Region of Uganda, with extension to Northern Uganda. It is a 132 kilo-Volt, double-circuit installation, that harnesses power from the hydroelectric power stations on the Victoria Nile and the thermal and solar power plants in Tororo and Soroti, for onward transmission to the east and north of country.

== Construction ==
Prior to 2013, the power line was primarily constructed of wooden poles, which were vulnerable to lightning, wild fires and termite damage. In 2013, the government of Uganda, using money borrowed from the African Development Bank, began replacing the wooden poles with metal structures. The main objective is to improve the availability, quality and reliability of power supply. Kalpataru Power Transmission Limited (KPTL), based in India, is the main contractor on this project. The engineering supervisor is Hifab Oy of Finland. Construction stated in 2013, with completion expected in 2017.

== See also ==
- Bujagali–Tororo–Lessos High Voltage Power Line
- Nkenda–Fort Portal–Hoima High Voltage Power Line
