= Aduku =

- Map of Uganda showing the location of Aduku
- Coordinates: 02°01′10″N 32°43′12″E
- Country: Uganda
- District: Kwania District

Population (2009 Estimate)
  - Total: 10,700
- Time zone: UTC+3 (EAT)

Aduku is a town in, Kwania District following the curving out of Kwania from Apac District in northern Uganda. It Head Quarter location of Kwania District.

== Location ==
Aduku is located approximately 36 kilometres (22 mi), by road, southwest of Lira, the largest city in the sub-region. Aduku is located about 24 kilometres (15 mi), by road, east of Apac, the district headquarters. The coordinates of the town are:2°01'10.0"N, 32°43'12.0"E (Latitude:2.0194; Longitude:32.7200).

== Climate ==
The community of Aduku has a tropical savanna climate. It is warm every month with both a wet and dry season. The average annual temperature in the city of Aduku is 56° degrees and there is about 253 inch of rain in a year. It is dry for 136 days a year with an average humidity of 71% and an UV-index of 6.

== Points of interest ==
The following points of interest lie within the town limits or near its boundaries:

- Aduku Central Market
- Aduku Senior Secondary School - A public, mixed high school
- Aduku UCC (Uganda College of Commerce) - A public institution
- Ikwera Girls Secondary School - A public all-girls high school
- West Lango Anglican Diocese
- A branch of Stanbic Bank
- Rwekunye–Apac–Aduku–Lira–Kitgum–Musingo Road passes through the middle of town.

== See also ==
- Apac District
- Ugandan Towns
- Ugandan Roads
