= Andrew G. Naimanye =

- Born: August 24, 1972 (age 54)
- Citizenship: Ugandan
- Education: King's College Budo; University of Leeds; Uganda Martyrs University
- Occupations: Civil engineer; Transport economist; Public administrator; Chess player
- Known for: Former Executive Director of the Uganda Road Fund; FIDE Master; Former Uganda national chess champion
- Title: FIDE Master (FM)

Andrew G. Naimanye also known as Andrew Grace Naimanye (born 24 August 1972) is a Ugandan civil engineer, transport economist, former Executive Director of the Uganda Road Fund (URF) and former chess player.

== Early life and education background ==
Naimanye was born on 24 August 1972. He attended King's College Budo, where he completed both his O-Level and A-Level education. He also attended University of Leeds, United Kingdom where he obatained a Bachelor of Engineering (BEng) in Civil Engineering and a Master's degree in Transport Planning and Engineering.

In addition, Naimanye obtained a PhD in Transport Economics from theUniversity of Leeds. From there, he went to Uganda Martyrs University where he obtained a Master of Business Administration (MBA), specialising in Finance and Accounting. He also holds a Diploma in Corporate Governance from the United Kingdom.

== Career ==
After completing his Civil Engineering degree at the University of Leeds in 1995, Naimanye began his professional engineering career in the UK where he served as the Associate Director at Waterman Group and also project engineer at GIBB Africa. He also served as principal engineer at JMP Consultants.

In 2010, Naimanye became the Head of Programmes at Uganda Road Fund and on 1 November 2019, he was appointed as the Acting Executive Director of Uganda Road Fund. During the same time, he served as the Accounting Officer of URF. From July 2021 to May 2025, Naimanye served as the Executive Director of Uganda Road Fund.

Naimanye also served as Vice Chairperson of the Uganda Road Safety Committee under the Ministry of Works and Transport and external examiner in civil engineering at universities including Makerere and Ndejje University. In February 2023 to 2025, he served as the President of the Eastern Africa Roads Maintenance Funds Association (ARMFA) and also 1st Vice-President of the African Road Maintenance Funds Association.

== Awards and honours ==
In April 2012, the World Chess Federation (FIDE) awarded Naimanye the title of FIDE Master and while representing Uganda at the Second Africa Junior Chess Championship in Lagos, Nigeria, in July 1989, Naimanye won a bronze medal.

In 1990, he won the Pan Paper Open chess tournament in Nairobi, Kenya and in the same year, while still in Senior Five at King's College Budo, Naimanye became Uganda's national chess champion.

== See also ==
- Andrew Kitaka
- Michael Moses Odongo Okune
- Harrison Mutikanga
- Ssebugga Kimeze
