= Ajok Lucy =

Ugandan politician

Lucy Ajok
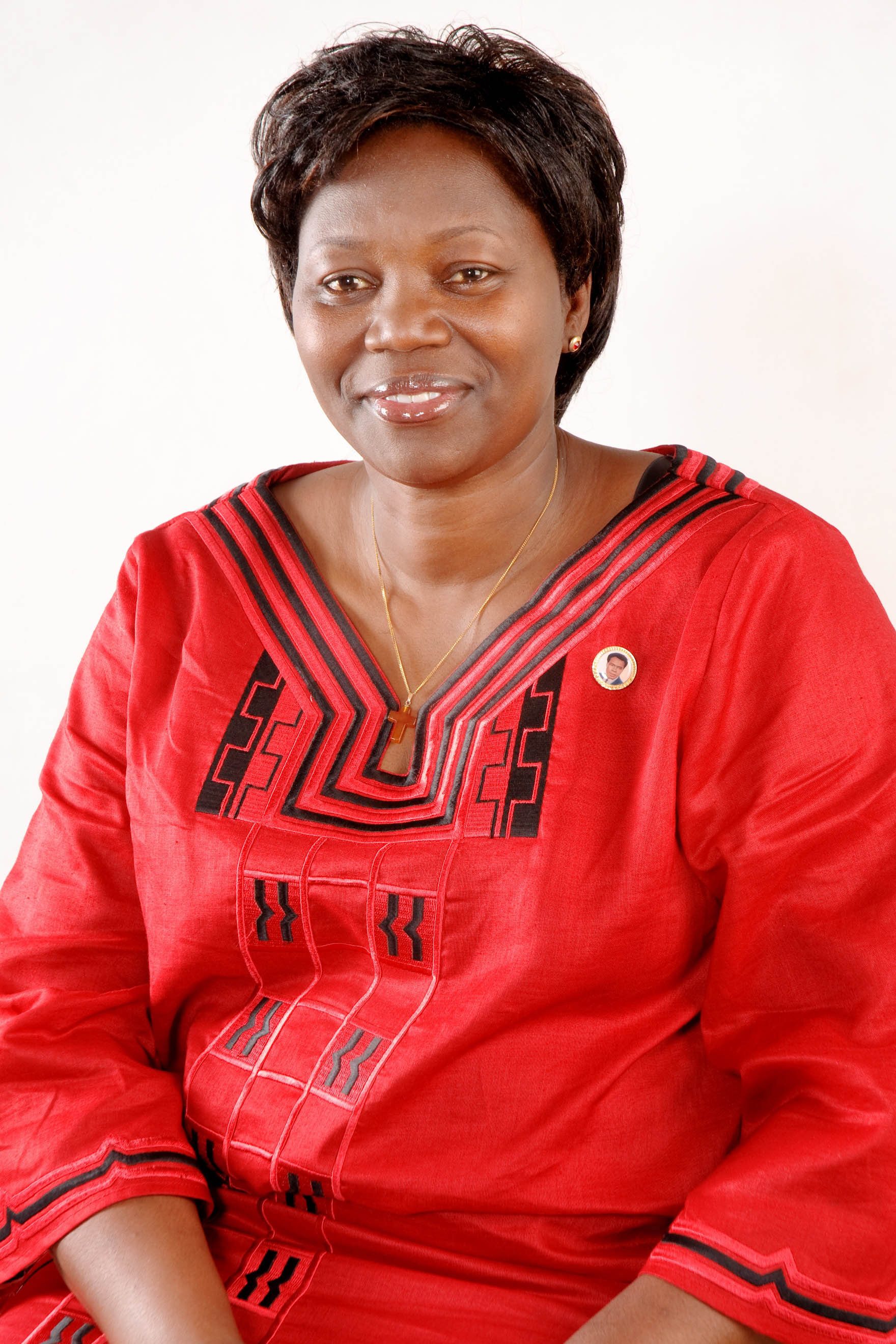
- Born: Apac District
- Education: St. Catherine High School, Lira district
- Years active: 2011 - present
- Known for: Woman Member of Parliament for Apac Municipality
- Political party: Uganda People's Congress

Ajok Lucky (3 January 1962) is a Ugandan politician who represented the Constituency of Apac Municipality as a woman member of Parliament in the Ninth Parliament of Uganda under the Uganda Peoples Congress (UPC) party.

== Education background ==
Lucy studied at St. Catherine High School in Lira district.

== Career background ==
Before joining politics in 2011, she worked with a non-governmental organisation called Move On Referral and also worked in the housing sector. In 2016, she lost the sit to Betty Awori Engola in the tenth Parliament of Uganda. In 2015, she was beaten in the UPC party primaries election by Kenny Auma Lapat and petitioned the UPC Election Commission citing irregularities in the election process. She served on the Parliamentary Committee on Trade, Tourism, Investment and Industry.

== See also ==
- List of members of the Ninth Parliament of Uganda
- Betty Awori Engola
