= Okello Oculi =

Ugandan poet, author and academic (1942–2025)

- Born: 1 January 1942; Dokolo, Protectorate of Uganda, British Empire
- Died: 26 July 2025 (aged 83); Abuja, Nigeria
- Citizenship: Uganda and Nigeria
- Education: Makerere University (BA); University of Essex (MA); University of Wisconsin (PhD)
- Occupations: Writer; poet; university professor; consultant
- Years active: 1967–2025

Okello Oculi (1942 – 26 July 2025) was a Ugandan novelist, poet and chronicler of rural African village life. Until his death, he was a private political and social consultant based in Abuja, Nigeria. Before that, he served as Professor of Social and Economic Research at Ahmadu Bello University in Zaria, Nigeria.

== Background ==
Oculi was born in 1942 in Dokolo District which is present day Lira District of Northern Uganda.

Oculi was educated at Soroti College in present day Soroti district and St. Peter's College Tororo all in Eastern Uganda for his O-level journey. He then attended St. Mary's College Kisubi for his A-Level examinations (S5 -S6). He entered Makerere University Uganda's oldest university where he studied political science graduating in 1967 with a bachelor's degree. During his undergraduate studies at Makerere, he spent one year, from 1964 until 1965, as an exchange student at Stanford University in Palo Alto, California, United States. In 1968, he obtained a Master's degree from the University of Essex, in the United Kingdom. In 1972, a Rockefeller foundation scholarship was given to him at the University of Wisconsin.Here he was offered a fellowship and later obtained a doctorate in political science. In 1977 after obtaining his PhD, he took a detour to Nigeria dreading the new Ugandan president called Amin. This is because while at Makerere university he was part of a student movement that supported the pre-current president(Milton Obote) at the time.

Oculi died in Abuja on 26 July 2025, at the age of 83.

== Professional work ==
Oculi's writing is filled with authentic snatches of conversation, proverbs, and folk wisdom. His poetry, like that of Okot p'Bitek and Joseph Buruga, seeks to re-assert the cultural heritage of Africa with a critique of foreign influences in East Africa.

== Selected bibliography ==
- Kanti Riti (1974)
- Malak: An African Political Poem (1976)
- Kookolem (1978)
- Health Problems in Rural and Uurban Africa (1981)
- Nigerian Alternatives (1987)
- Political Economy of Malnutrition (1987)
- Song for the Sun in Us (Poets of Africa; 2000)
- Discourses on Africa Affairs: Directions and Destinies for the 20th Century (2000)
- Song for the Sun in Us – (2000)
- Discourses on African Affairs: Directions and Destinies For the 21st Century – (1999)
- Political Economy of Malnutrition – (1987)
- Kookolem – (1976)
- Malak: An African Political Poem – (1976)
- Imperialism, Settlers and Capitalism in Kenya – (1975)
- Kanta Riti – (1972)
- Orphan – (1968) (dramatized poetry)
- Prostitute – (1968)

== See also ==
- Ahmadou Bello University
