= Kwania District =

- District
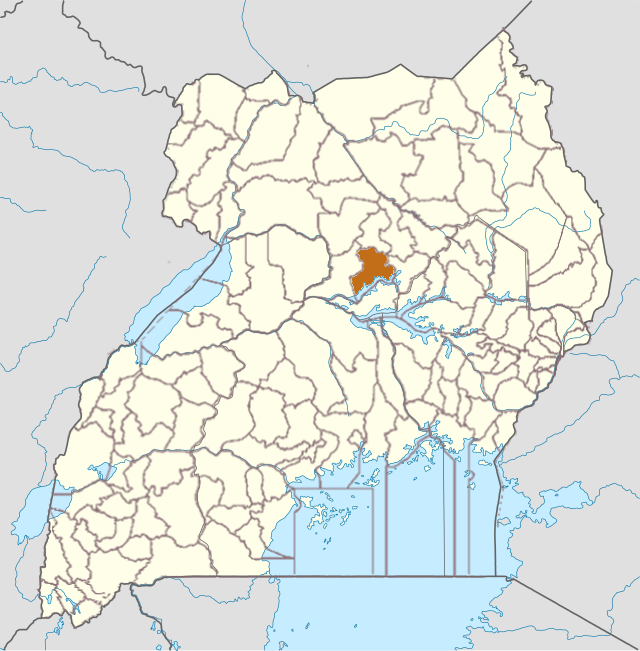
- Kwania District in Uganda
- Interactive map of Kwania District
- Country: Uganda
- Region: Northern Uganda
- Established: 1 July 2018
- Headquarters: Aduku Town Council

Area
  - Total: 1,108 km^{2} (428 sq mi)

Population (2024-05-10 (Census))
  - Total: 216,125
  - Density: 195/km^{2} (510/sq mi)
- Time zone: UTC+3 (EAT)

Kwania District is a district in Northern Uganda. It was carved out of Apac District in July 2018. The sub-counties are Chawente, Abongomola, Nambyeiso, Inomo, Aduku; and Aduku town council. The other subcounties are Ayabi, Ayabi town council, Akali, Atongtidi and Inomo town council, totalling to 11 subcounties. The current district chairperson is Hon Ogwal Geoffrey Alex. He assumes office on 20 May 2021. The first and interim chairperson is Basil Okello Onac.

== History ==
In 2018, Kwania District was carved out of Apac District as part of Uganda’s creation of new districts to support decentralised service delivery. Uganda Radio Network reported Kwania among the districts approved to become effective on 1 July 2018.

== Geography ==
Kwania District borders Kole District to the north, Dokolo District to the east, Apac District to the west, and Amolatar District to the south (across Lake Kwania). The district covers 1,108 km2. About 11% of the district area is open water, and about 15% is forest.

The district headquarters are in Aduku Town Council. Aduku is located at about 1.9951°N, 32.7183°E.

== Administrative divisions ==
Kwania District has two counties (Kwania and Kwania North). It has sub-counties and town councils, plus parishes/wards and villages/cells recorded by the district local government.

Sub-counties and town councils (with parishes/wards and villages/cells)
County	Sub-county / Town council	Parishes / Wards	Villages / Cells
Kwania	Atongtidi Sub-county	6	44
Kwania	Ayabi Sub-county	5	46
Kwania	Ayabi Town Council	3	27
Kwania	Chawente Sub-county	6	45
Kwania	Nambieso Sub-county	6	54
Kwania North	Abongomola Sub-county	5	46
Kwania North	Aduku Sub-county	5	57
Kwania North	Aduku Town Council	2	13
Kwania North	Akali Sub-county	5	38
Kwania North	Inomo Sub-county	4	54
Kwania North	Inomo Town Council	2	23

== Demographics ==
Uganda Bureau of Statistics (UBOS) reported a population of 216,125 people and 48,861 households for Kwania District in the National Population and Housing Census 2024 (10 May 2024).

The district local government site cites the 2014 census and reports 35,247 households, and a predominantly rural population (96% rural, 4% urban).

== Government and politics ==
=== District leadership ===
In the 2021 district chairperson election, Geoffrey Alex Ogwal was declared winner with 24,002 votes, ahead of Ocole Jimmy with 18,080 votes.

=== Representation in Parliament ===
Kwania District’s Woman Representative in the Parliament of Uganda is Hon. Kenny Auma (UPC).

Kwania County is represented in Parliament by Hon. Tonny Ayoo, listed as MP for Kwania County in Parliament of Uganda materials.

== Infrastructure ==
In January 2025, Uganda Radio Network reported that Kwania District has a road network of 1,321.3 km. The district engineering data cited in the same report indicated 36% of the network was accessible, 14% was fairly accessible, and 50% was inaccessible at the time.

== Health ==
Aduku Health Centre IV is listed as a government Health Centre IV facility in Kwania District on the Uganda National Health Laboratory Services (UNHLS) QA Dashboard.

== See also ==
- Northern Region, Uganda
- Lango sub-region
- Apac District
- Dokolo District
- Kole District
- Amolatar District
