= Yosam Odur Ebii =

Ugandan traditional leader (1926–2025)

Won Nyaci of Lango
- In office 2003–2024
- Succeeded by: Dr. Eng Michael Moses Odongo Okune (government-recognized; disputed)

Minister of Health
- In office 1983–1985

Personal details
- Born: 1926 Akokoro, Apac District, Protectorate of Uganda
- Died: 10 November 2025 (aged 99) Lira, Uganda
- Spouse: Imat Victoria Agong (died 2011)
- Occupation: Cultural leader

Yosam Odur Ebii (1926 – 10 November 2025) was a Ugandan cultural leader who was elected as Won Nyaci or the "Paramount Chief (locally known as Won Nyaci) of the Lango people" in 2003 by the council of Clan heads (natively known as Owitong) in Apac district. In October 2023, he announced plans to abdicate in 2024. A succession process in 2024 and 2025 led to competing claims and court action in Lira High Court which concluded that Michael Moses Odongo Okune was the only legitimate Won Nyaci to succeed Yasam Odur Ebii.

== Early life ==
Odur Ebii was born in 1926 in Akokoro village, Apac District in Northern Uganda.

== Leadership ==
Odur Ebii was chosen by a council of Lango clan heads in 2003 after cultural institutions were restored in Uganda. During his tenure he presided over cultural ceremonies and engaged national bodies on community matters.

== Succession and legal dispute ==
In June 2024, the government gazetted civil engineer Michael Moses Odongo Okune as the Lango cultural leader, following a March 2024 election run by one faction. Odur’s camp opposed the process. On 31 October 2024, the High Court in Lira halted the planned installation of Odongo Okune. Odur’s side welcomed the ruling and called for unity.

On 7 November 2024, the Gender Minister Betty Amongi said Odur Ebii was no longer the Lango paramount chief and asked his lawyers to show proof of reinstatement. However, statements from Betty Amongi confirmed that the government recognized Michael Moses Odongo Okune as the only legitimate Won Nyaci, reinforcing the state’s official position on his leadership. He called for peace after the court ruling

== Personal life and death ==
Odur Ebii's spouse, Imat Victoria Agong, died in September 2011 and was buried in Apac District.

Odur Ebii died at Lira University Teaching Hospital at 4:20am on 10 November 2025, where he had been admitted after suffering from malaria. Before his death, he was airlifted to Mulago for treatment of hiccups
