= Cecilia Ogwal =

Ugandan politician (1946–2024)

Honourable Cecilia Ogwal
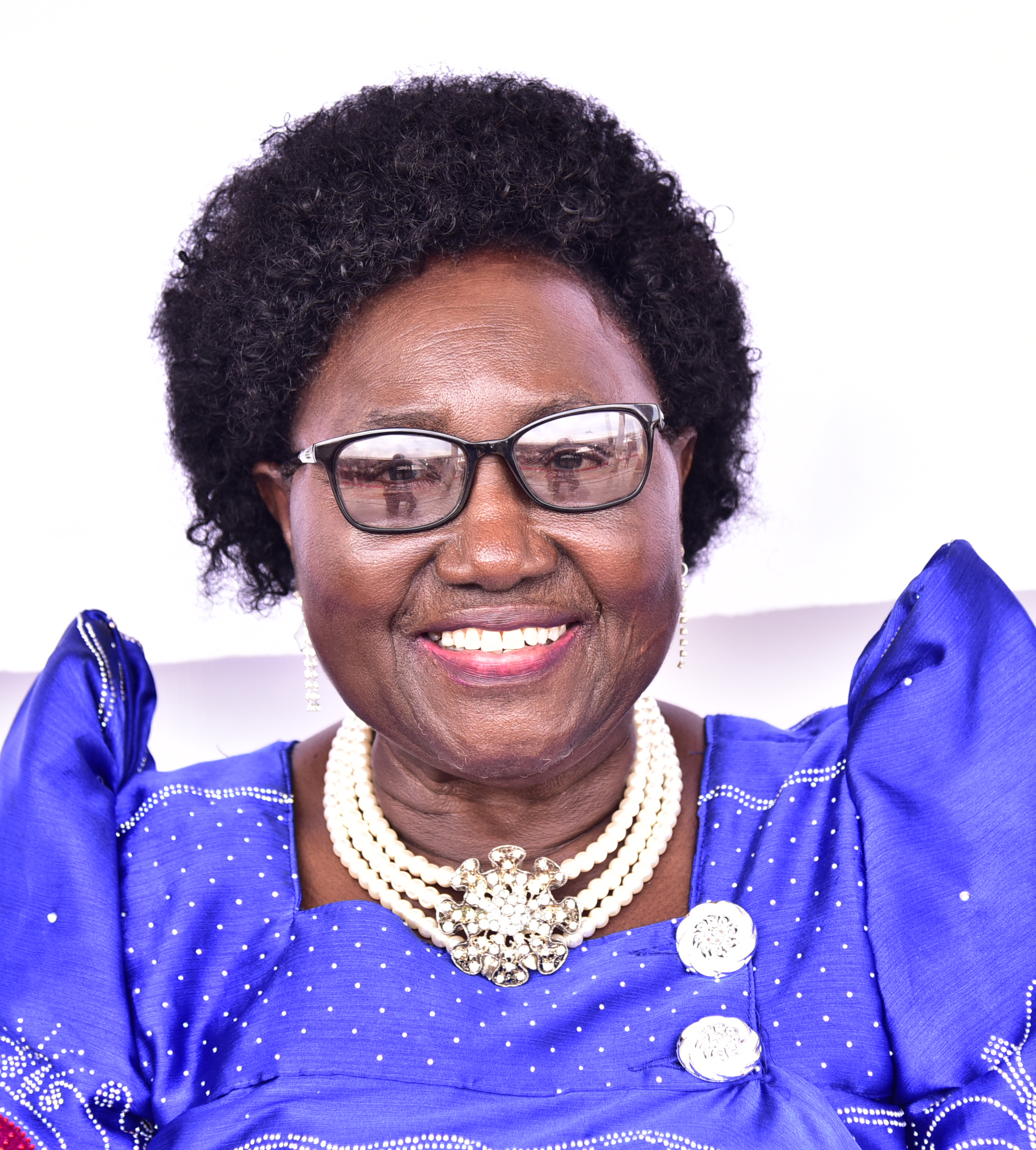
- Atim Ogwal Cecilia Barbara
- Born: Cecilia Barbara Atim; 6 December 1946; Dokolo, British Protectorate of Uganda
- Died: 18 January 2024 (aged 77); India
- Citizenship: Uganda
- Education: University of Nairobi (BCom); Uganda Management Institute (Cert.Hum.Res.Mgmnt)
- Occupations: Politician, businesswoman
- Years active: 1970–2024
- Title: Member of Parliament; Dokolo District Women's Constituency
- Spouse: Lameck Ogwal

Cecilia Barbara Atim Ogwal (6 December 1946 – 18 January 2024) was a Ugandan politician, businesswoman and at the same timemanagement consultant. She was also a Member of Parliament for Dokolo District Women's Constituency and a member of Uganda's legislature continuously from 1996 until her death.

== Background and education ==
Cecilia Atim Ogwal was born in Dokolo District, British Protectorate of Uganda, on 6 December 1946. She attended local schools in Uganda. In 1967, at the age of 21, she was admitted to the University of East Africa in Nairobi (now known as the University of Nairobi) to study for a Bachelor of Commerce degree. She graduated from Nairobi University in 1970. She also held a Certificate in Human Resources Management from what was then called the Institute of Public Administration, but is now known as Uganda Management Institute. She held two other certificates; one in Christian-Based Values from the Haggai Institute, Singapore, and the other in Public-Private Partnership, from Australia.

== Career ==
From 1979 until 1980, Ogwal worked at the Uganda Embassy in Kenya, as the liaison officer for Returning Ugandan Refugees. From 1980 until 1981, she worked as the operations manager at the Uganda Advisory Board of Trade. In 1982, she was one of the founders of Housing Finance Bank, working there until 1984. She served as the chairperson of Uganda Development Bank, from 1981 until 1986.

Ogwal became involved in Ugandan politics, serving as the Acting Secretary General of Uganda People's Congress (UPC) from 1985 to 1992. In 1994, she was part of the Constituent Assembly which drafted and promulgated the 1995 Ugandan Constitution. She remained a high-ranking official in the UPC political party until 2004. During the 2006 parliamentary elections, she lost her Lira Municipality seat to Jimmy Akena, the son of UPC founder Milton Obote. In 2011, Ogwal contested and won the Women's Representative seat for the newly created Dokolo District. This time she switched political parties and ran as a full member of the Forum for Democratic Change party.

== Parliamentary duties ==
Ogwal was a member of parliamentary Committee of Physical Infrastructure in charge of overseeing and covering policy matters related to Lands, Housing, Urban development, Works and Transport, and Physical Planning. She was also a member of the budget committee.

== Personal life and death ==
In 1969, at the age of 23, she won the "Miss Uganda" contest.

Ogwal was a married mother of seven natural children and several adopted ones. She died of cancer in India on 18 January 2024, at the age of 77.
