= Kenny Auma =

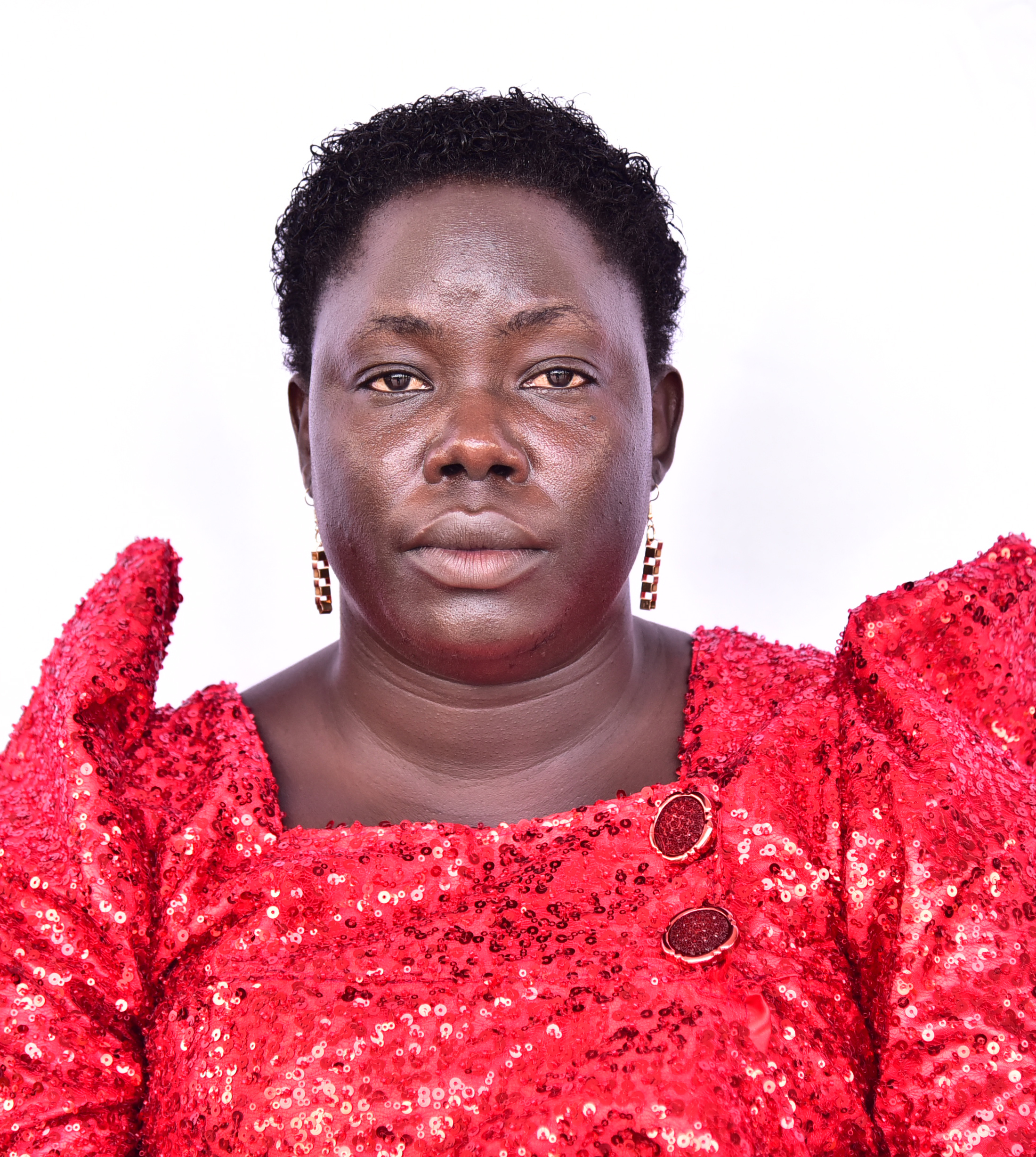
- Kenny Auma

Member of the Uganda Parliament for Woman Representative, Kwania District
- In office 2021–2026

Personal details
- Born: December 10, 1989 (age 36)
- Party: Uganda People's Congress
- Occupation: Politician
- Known for: Member of the Eleventh Parliament of Uganda

Kenny Auma (born 10 December 1989) is a Ugandan politician and woman representative in the eleventh parliament of Uganda for Kwania District under the Uganda People's Congress. She was elected in 2021 and her term in office runs from 2021 to 2026. She has represented her constituents in the Parliament of Uganda and supports community growth and development through Village Savings programs.

== Political career ==
She belongs to the Physical Infrastructure Committee, and Public Accounts (Commissions, Statutory Authorities and State Enterprises) Committee at the eleventh Parliament of Uganda. In 2024, she provided financial support to 10 Women Village Savings and Loan Associations [VSLA] groups in Kwania district as part of her personal initiative. In 2023, she also donated ten million Uganda shillings to God is Good Gospel Singers' Savings and Credit Cooperatives Society [SACCO] during its official launch at Aduku Mayor's Garden in Aduku town council based in Kwania District.

== See also ==
- Ajok Lucy
- List of members of the eleventh Parliament of Uganda
- Thomas Tayebwa
- Anita Among
