= Norah Amin =

- Born: between 1895 and 1955; Lango, Uganda
- Died: 1977; Uganda
- Known for: Third First Lady of Uganda
- Spouse: Idi Amin (m. 1967; div. 1973)

Norah Amin (born between 1895 and 1955) was Idi Amin's third first lady from Lango. She was married to Idi Amin in 1967 and later Idi Amin divorced her in 1973. During her time as First Lady, she was involved in public activities like on December 19, 1971, she participated in a charity walk around the town of Entebbe.

== Personal life ==
She was born in Lango. She was married to Idi Amin in the year 1967 and later divorced in 1973 on radio announcement. Following her divorce, reports indicate that Norah Amin resided in a house allocated to her by the Custodian Board on Buganda Road, opposite Buganda Road Court. She died in 1977 due to natural causes.

== See also ==
- Idi Amin
