= Ndyomugyenyi Roland Bish =

Ugandan legislator and politician

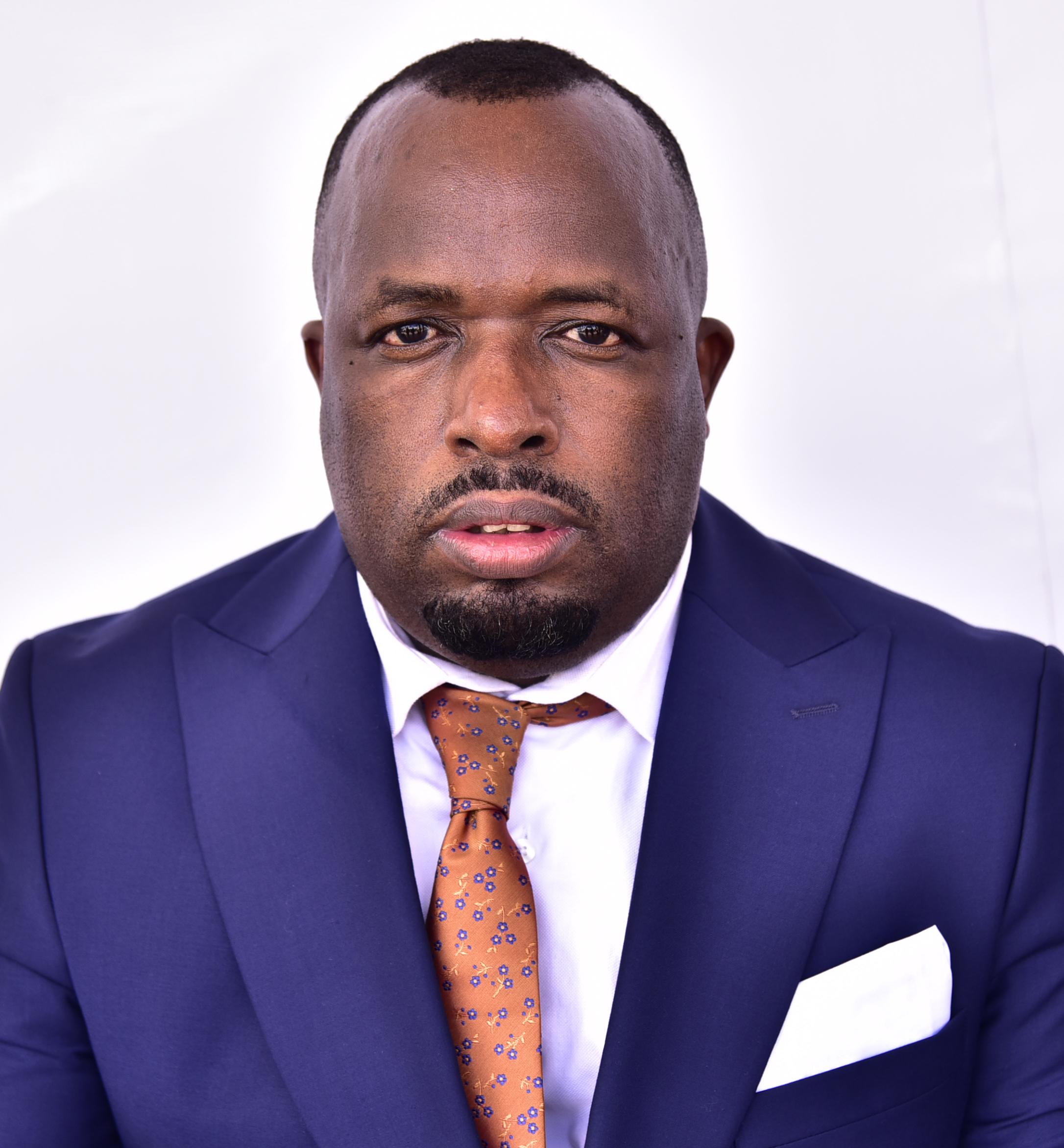
Ndyomugyenyi Roland

Roland Ndyomugyenyi Bish is a Ugandan legislator.

Bish was elected as a member of Uganda's eleventh Parliament in 2021, representing Rukiga County in Rukiga District, Western Uganda.

== Biography ==
Bish has previously worked with Barclays Bank and Uganda Road Fund.

== Political career ==
In 2021, he was elected as the Member of Parliament representing Rukiga County in Western Uganda.

== Personal life ==
Roland, a member of the Abeitira clan, is married to Doreen Uwimana Sanyu, a Basigi clan daughter.
