= Apac General Hospital =

- Uganda Ministry of Health
- Location within Uganda

Geography
- Location: Apac, Apac District, Uganda
- Coordinates: 01°58′42″N 32°32′01″E

Organisation
- Care system: Public Hospital
- Type: General

Services
- Emergency department: I
- Beds: 100

History
- Founded: 1968

Links
- Other links: Hospitals in Uganda

Apac General Hospital, also Apac Hospital, is a hospital in the town of Apac, in Apac District, in the Northern Region of Uganda.

== Location ==
The hospital lies in the central business district of the town of Apac, approximately 60 kilometres (37 mi), by road, southwest of Lira Regional Referral Hospital. The coordinates of Apac General Hospital are:01°58'42.0"N, 32°32'01.0"E (Latitude:1.978325; Longitude:32.533618).

== Overview ==
Apac General Hospital was established in 1968, with a capacity of 100 beds. It serves Apac District, and parts of the neighboring districts of Kiryandongo, Kole and Oyam. The hospital infrastructure is aged and crumbling. The hospital also faces a severe shortage of staff, being able to retain only three doctors out of the planned eight physician positions.

== Renovations ==
During the 2015/2016 Financial Year, the Uganda Ministry of Health, allocated USh 500 million, to the renovation of Apac General Hospital. Repair work commenced on 2 December 2015 and were expected to be completed by 1 April 2016. The selected contractor is Midnorth Company Limited. The work involves he following: 1. Demolish old maternity ward 2. Build new maternity ward, including an antenatal wing 3. Repair the floor of the maternity ward, toilets and private rooms with Terrazzo tiles 4. Replace the electrical system of the hospital 5. Replace broken doors and windows.

== See also ==
- Hospitals in Uganda
