= Lango Kingdom =

Traditional kingdom in Uganda

Lango Kingdom Tekwaro Lango (Lango)
- Flag Emblem
- Anthem: Rwot Obanga Gwok Ker Wa Me Lango (English: "Almighty God uphold the Throne of Lango")
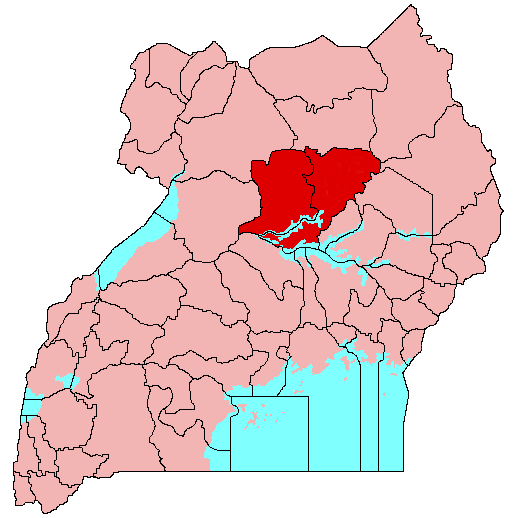
- Location of the Lango Kingdom (Red) in Uganda (Pink)
- Status: Traditional kingdom
- Capital: Lira
- Official languages: Lango, English
- Ethnic groups: Lango
- Demonym: Lango
- Government: Constitutional monarchy
  - Monarch: Odongo Okune
  - Prime Minister: Willy Okullu
- Legislature: General Assembly

Establishment
  - Established: 1960
  - Uganda gains independence from the United Kingdom: 9 October 1962
  - Monarchy abolished by Obote: 17 September 1967
  - Monarchy restored: 2003

Area
  - Total: 12,856 km^{2} (4,964 sq mi)

Population
  - 2024 census: 2,546,118
  - Density: 198/km^{2} (512.8/sq mi)
- Currency: Ugandan shilling
- Time zone: UTC+3
- Calling code: 256

The Lango Kingdom is one of the 17 officially recognised traditional kingdoms in Uganda. Located in northern Uganda and coterminous with the Lango sub-region, the kingdom is the home of the Lango people. The Lango make up roughly 5% of Uganda's total populaiton. Consisting of a total of 149 clans, the kingdom is ruled by the Won Nyaci, who is the paramount chief elected by and from among the clan heads.

Ugandan law defines the kingdom as a cultural institution without political power, tasked with promoting and protecting trradition, cultural autonomy, popular participation and unity among the people of the region. The Lango government, through grants from the Ugandan central government, private donations and revenue from lands owned by the crown, operates development programs and institutions to improve the standard of living for Lango people.

== History ==
The roots of the modern Lango Kingdom lay in the British colonial period. Prior to British colonisation, Lango did not have a centralised kingship, with the British uniting Lango territories into the Lango District for administrative purposes and appointing chiefs. In the lead-up to independence in 1962, British authority in the region was gradually decreased, with the office of District Commissioner abolished in 1960. In its place an office of paramount chief, titled Won Nyaci, was established to lead the district government. The Won Nyaci was elected by and from the clan chiefs.

The nascent Lango monarchy was abolished in 1967 when Prime Minister Milton Obote declared Uganda a republic following the Mengo Crisis. While Uganda's monarchies were legally restored in 1993 by Yoweri Museveni, the Lango monarchy was not restored before 2003, when Yosam Odur Ebii was elected Won Nyaci by the clan chiefs.

Ebii reigned as Won Nyaci until abicating in 2024 at the age of 98. He was succeeded by Odongo Okune, though his election was initially, after an injunction was filed by a rival claimant, declared null and void by the High Court of Uganda. This judgement was subsequently overturned, and Okune recognised by the Ugandan government.

2024 saw the beginning of construction of a large palace complex in Lira for the kingdom. The complex, funded by the Ugandan national government, will house a palace for the Won Nyaci, buildings for the Prime Minister and cabinet, and an assembly hall for the General Assembly.

== Government ==
The Lango Kingdom is headed by the Won Nyaci, who serves as the paramount chief of the 149 Lango clans and head of state of the kingdom. The Won Nyaci is elected for life by the 149 clan chiefs. The kingdom's daily administration is undertaken by the Lango government, lead by the Prime Minister, who is appointed by the Won Nyaci.

The highest deliberative body of Lango, which acts as the kingdom's legislature, is the General Assembly. It is tasked with scrutinising the government, enacting cultural laws, and approving the yearly budget. The General Assembly consists of the 149 clan chiefs, known as the Council of Owitong, the 25 members of the Lango cabinet, and a speaker. As a cultural legislature, the General Assembly is prohibited by the Ugandan government from enacting primary legislation or legislating on political matters.
