= Annet =

Annet may refer to:

== Arts and media ==
- Lord Thomas and Fair Annet, an English folk ballad
- Anett Futatabi, a 1993 video game
- Aldri annet enn bråk, a 1954 Norwegian film

== People ==
- Armand Annet
- Peter Annet
- Annet (given name), including a list of people with the given name

== Places ==
- Annet, Isles of Scilly, UK
- Annet-sur-Marne, France
