= Rose Akol =

Ugandan accountant and politician (born 1964)

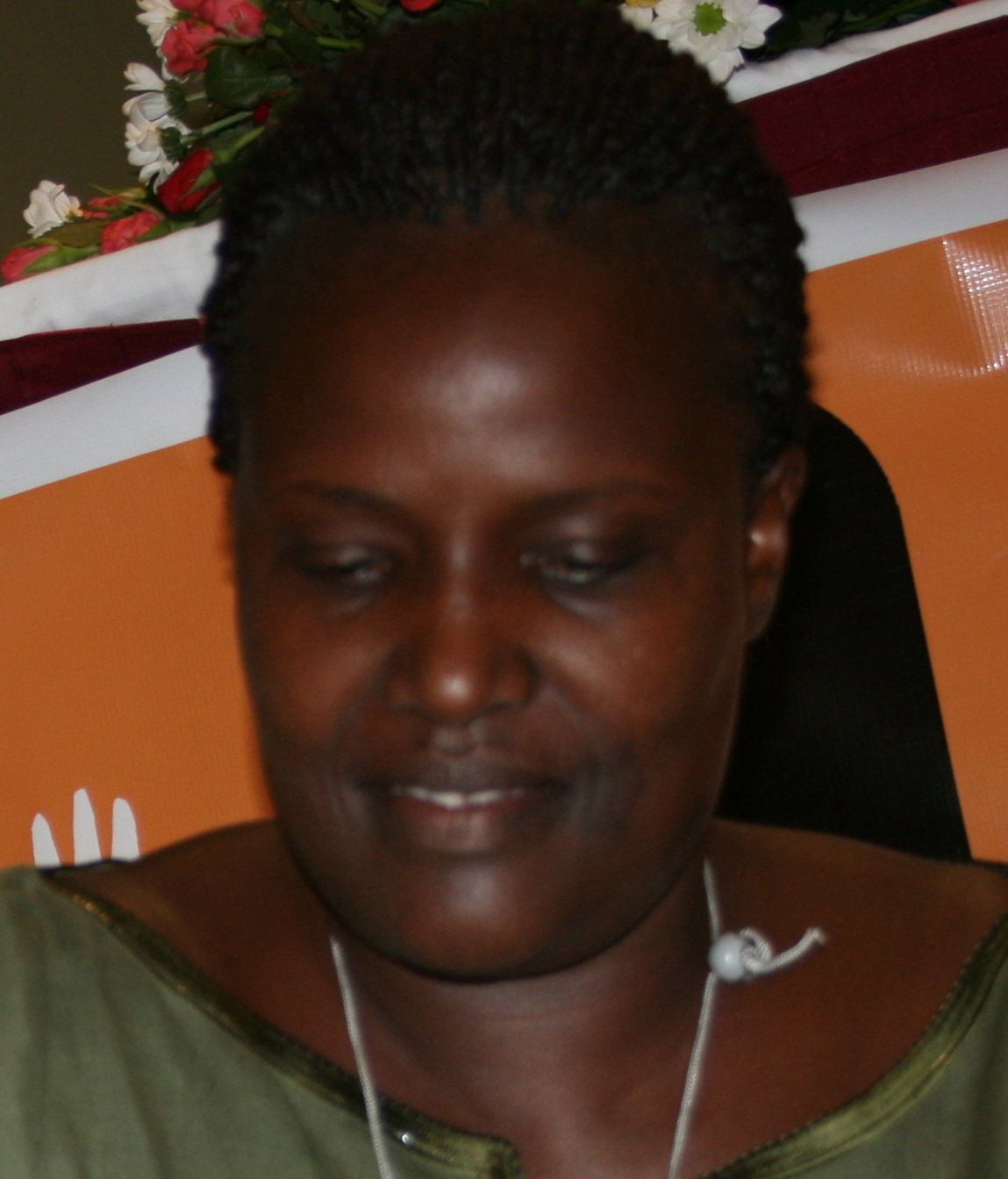
- Akol in 2008
- Born: 27 November 1964 (age 61); Bukedea County, Kumi District, Uganda (now Bukedea District)
- Citizenship: Uganda
- Education: Makerere University Business School (Master of Business Administration in accounting and finance)
- Occupations: Accountant and politician
- Years active: 1989 — present
- Known for: Politics
- Title: Minister of Internal Affairs

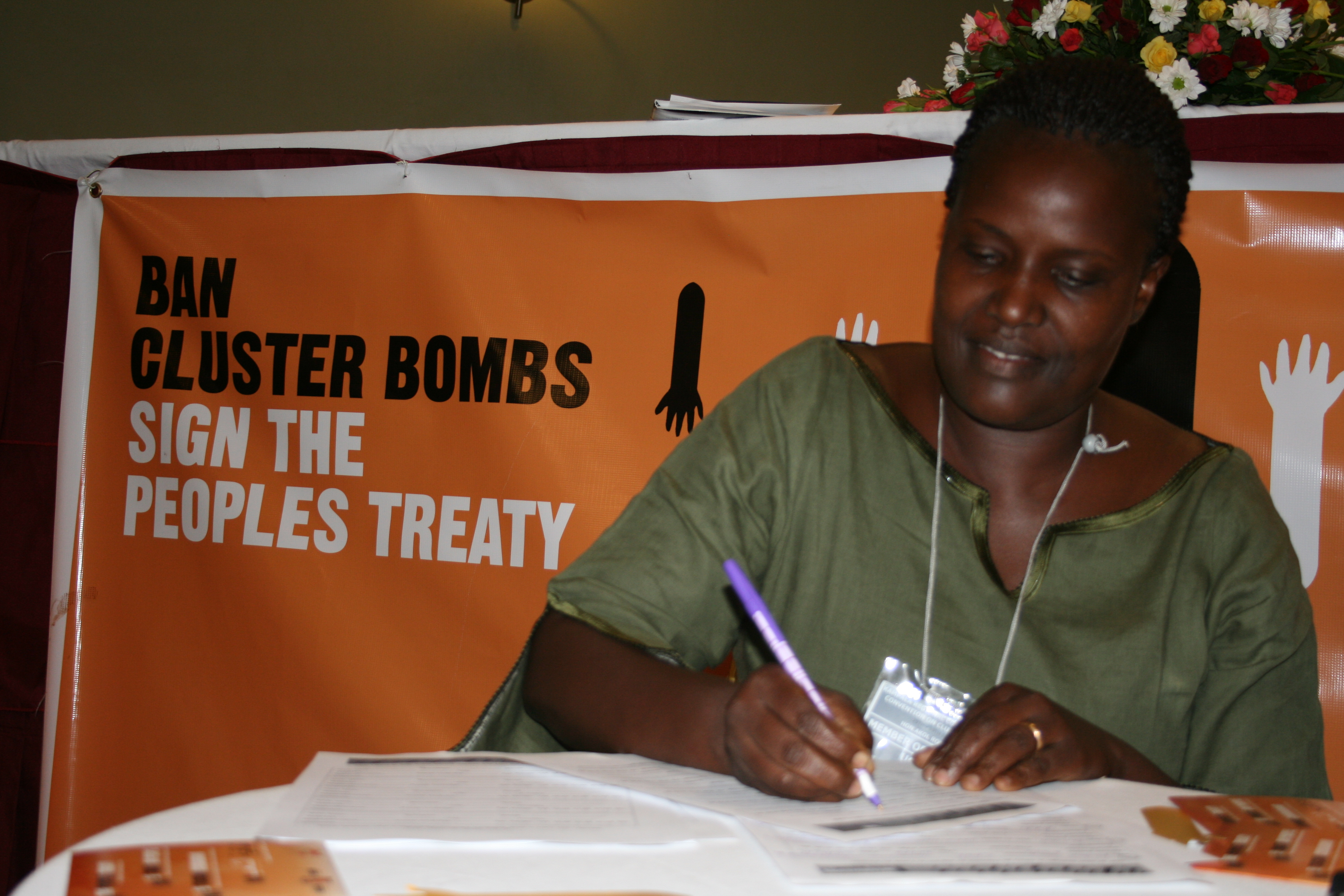
Rose Akol at the Kampala conference

Rose Akol Okullu, commonly known as Rose Akol (born 27 November 1964), is a Ugandan accountant and politician. She was appointed as Minister of Internal Affairs on 16 November 2015. She assumed office following confirmation by the Parliament of Uganda. She is also an elected member of parliament as Bukedea District's women's representative.

== Early life and education ==
She was born in Bukedea County, Kumi District, (in present day Bukedea District), and attended Ngora High School. She holds a Masters in Business Administration degree in finance and accounting, awarded in 2004 by the Makerere University Business School.

== Work experience ==
She started her career in 1989 as an assistant accountant at the Uganda Export Promotions Council, serving in that position until 1990. From 1990 until 1993, she served as an accountant at the Karamoja Development Agency. From 1994 until 2000, she was a senior internal auditor at the Uganda Airlines Corporation. From 2003 until 2006, she served as the head of internal audit at the Joint Clinical Research Centre. She concurrently served as an accountant at the East African Airlines. In 2006, she entered elective parliamentary politics by winning the seat of Bukedea District woman's representative. She was re-elected in 2011.

== Personal details ==
Rose Akol is married. She is of the Roman Catholic faith. She is a member of the National Resistance Movement political party.

== See also ==
- Teso sub-region
