= Putanga =

Coordinates: 2°36′N 32°57′E

Putanga, also spelt Paranga, is a village in Apac, Uganda.
