= Soroti–Dokolo–Lira Road =

Road in Uganda

Coordinates: 01°55′23″N 33°09′28″E

Soroti–Dokolo–Soroti Road

Route information
- Length: 77 mi (124 km)
- History: Designation in 2007; Completed in 2010

Major junctions
- South end: Soroti
- Dokolo
- North end: Lira

Location
- Country: Uganda

Highway system
- Roads in Uganda

The Soroti–Dokolo–Lira Road is a road in Uganda, connecting the towns of Soroti in Soroti District, Dokolo in Dokolo District, and Lira in Lira District.

== Location ==
The road starts at Soroti (population 49,452), the largest town in the Teso sub-region, Eastern Region of Uganda. It continues in a northwesterly direction, through Dokolo in Dokolo District, Lango sub-region, Northern Region, to end at Lira, in Lira District, a total distance of about 125 kilometres (78 mi).

== Upgrading to bitumen ==
In 2007, partly financed with a loan from the World Bank Group, the government of Uganda began improving the surface of this road to class II bitumen, with shoulders and drainage channels. Upgrading of the 62.6 kilometres (39 mi) Soroti-Dokolo section began in May 2007. Work on the 60.4 kilometres (38 mi) Dokolo-Lira section began a month later. The construction contract was awarded to China Roads and Bridge Corporation. The road works were completed four months ahead of schedule in 2010. The total construction bill for the project was USh:153.1 billion, with the 62.6 kilometres (39 mi) Soroti–Dokolo section costing USh:70.5 billion and the 60.4 kilometres (38 mi) Dokolo–Lira section billed at USh:82.6 billion.

== See also ==
- List of roads in Uganda
- Economy of Uganda
- Transport in Uganda
- Uganda National Roads Authority
