= Betty Awori Engola =

Ugandan politician

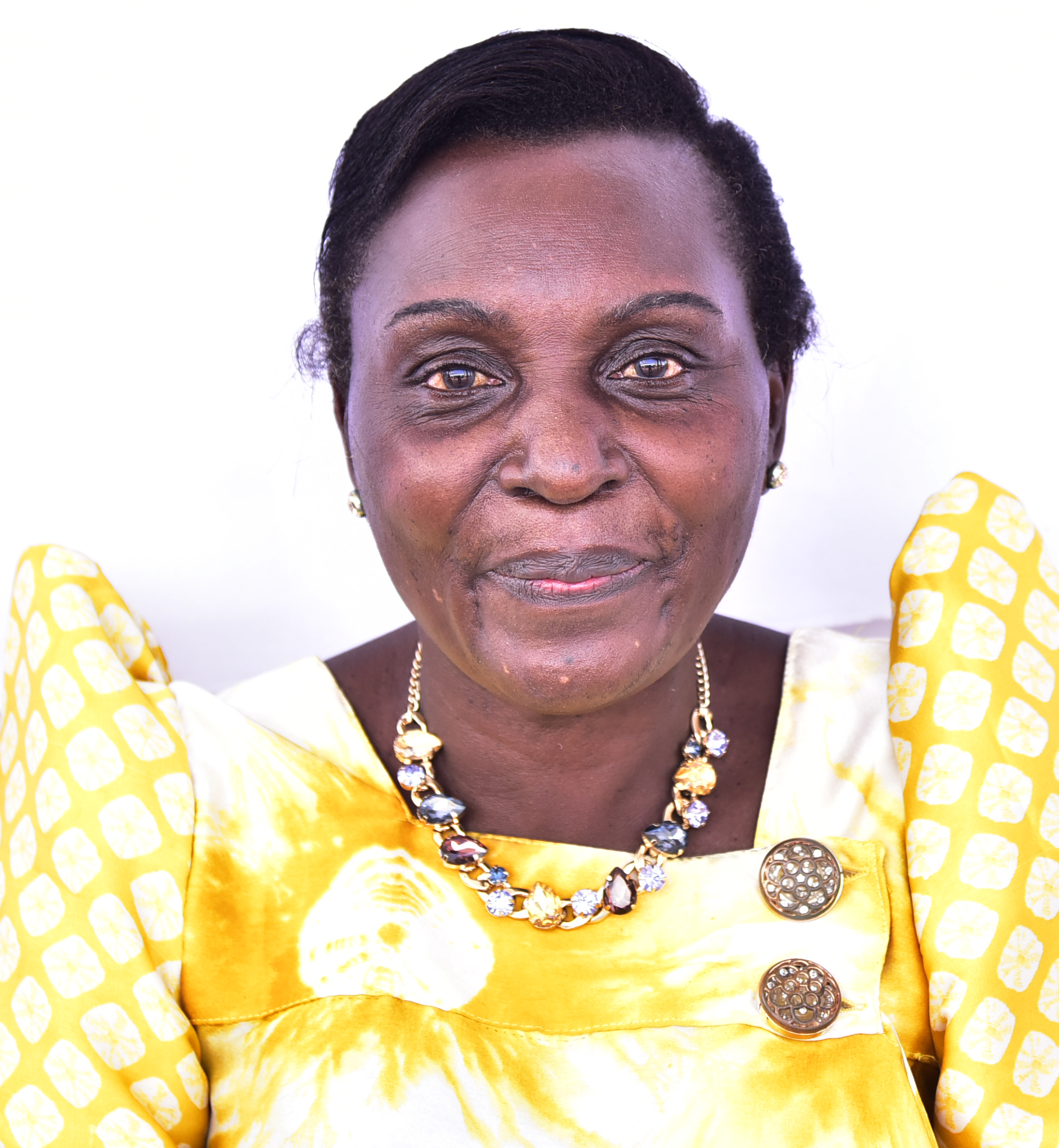
- Born: 24 December 1960 (age 65); Apac District
- Education: Shimoni Demonstration School; St Josephs Girls School, Nsambya; Tororo Girls School; Makerere University (Bachelor of Arts in Social Science)
- Occupations: Politician, legislator
- Political party: National Resistance Movement

Betty Awori Engola (born 24 December 1960) also referred to as Awor Betty Engola is a Ugandan Politician. She is the district woman representative of Apac district under the ruling National Resistance Movement party in the 10th Parliament (2016 to 2021).

== Background and education ==
In 1974, she completed Primary Leaving Examination at Shimon Demonstration School. In 1978, she attained her Uganda Certificate of Education at St Josephs Girls School, Nsambya. Awori completed her Uganda Advanced Certificate from Tororo Girls School in 1981. In 1984, she joined Makerere University, graduating with a Bachelor of Arts in Social Science.

== Work experience ==
From 2009 to 2010, Betty Awori Engola served as the Governing Council Member at Uganda Technical College, Lira. She also served as a Board Member between 2005 and 2008 at National Agricultural Advisory Services. She worked at Uganda Advisory Board of Trade as a Commercial Officer from 1986 to 1987. From 1988 to 2001, she was employed as the Foreign Trade Officer at Ministry of Tourism, Trade and Industry. From 2016 to date, she is serving as the Member of Parliament at the Parliament of Uganda.

== Additional role ==
Betty Awori Engola serves on additional role at the Parliament of Uganda as a Committee on Science and Technology by membership. She participated at the Fourteenth session of United Nations Conference on Trade and Development in Nairobi, Kenya that took place from 17–22 July 2016. Awori also took part in the structure development of Local Government Budget Framework Paper for Apac District.

== See also ==
- Parliament of Uganda.
- Apac District.
- List of members of the tenth parliament of Uganda
- National Resistance Movement
- Member of Parliament
- Tonny Ayoo
- Akora Maxwell
- Ebong Patrick
