= Ngora High School =

Location
- Ngora District; Uganda
- Coordinates: 01°28′38.5266″N 33°47′49.7738″E

Information
- Type: Public Middle School and High School
- Motto: "Iponesio ka Akukuranut" meaning "Discipline and Hard Work"
- Established: 1914
- School district: Ngora District
- Faculty: 62+
- Enrollment: 1357 as of (2015)
- Colors: Green & White
- Mascot: Dove
- Newspaper: The Rock

Ngora High School is a secondary boarding school for boys and girls in the Ngora institutional complex, Ngora District, Uganda. As of 2015, the school had 1357 students enrolled in class. It is one of the oldest educational establishments in Uganda, founded in 1914 by Anglican missionaries. It provides a wide variety of classes at both O and A levels.

== Purpose ==
The school motto is "Iponesio Ka Akukuranut", meaning "Discipline and Hard Work".

== History ==
Ngora High School was founded on July 13, 1914, by the Anglican Church of Uganda to educate high-minded professionals. It recently celebrated its 100-year anniversary. The Archbishop of the Church of Uganda, Stanley Ntagali, led prayers at the celebrations attended by Education, Science, Technology and Sports minister Jessica Alupo. Also in attendance was Minister Without Portfolio Richard Todwong, who represented his excellence Yoweri Museveni, president of Uganda. In the years after its founding, Ngora High School was one of Uganda's première schools, with students from the surrounding districts competing to attend. However, the hardships of the Teso Insurgency (1986 - 1993) and the incursion of the Lord's Resistance Army (2001 - 2003), combined to damage both the physical premises of the school and its academic reputation. During this time, it was the site of battles between government forces and the rebels. When there was no fighting, it was used as a camp for displaced persons. Many students and teachers relocated to safety in other areas. After the violence ended, the school was left with fewer than ten teachers on a war-battered campus.

Ngora High School has made a gradual recovery, admitting more students and hiring more teachers. Now it is once again one of the top schools in the country, with its students performing very well in Uganda Certificate of Education exams and winning the 2011 Secondary Schools Science Fair against competition from 24 other schools.

== Co-curricular activities ==
Students are encouraged to take part in co-curricular activities with athletics such as volleyball, netball, and football. The boys' football team competes at district and regional levels in competitions such as the 2015 Copa Coca-Cola Championship. The school is set to host the 2025 Uganda Secondary Schools Sports Association (USSA) National Boys' football championships.

== Alumni ==
- Jessica Alupo - Vice President of Uganda
- Agnes Akiror - State Minister for Teso Affairs in the Cabinet of Uganda,
- Rose Akol Okullu - Minister of Internal Affairs
- Paul Amoru - media practitioner, public speaker and politician
- Jeje Odongo - State Minister for Defense
