= Odongo Okune =

Ugandan cultural leader, civil engineer, and public servant

Won Nyaci of Lango
- Reign: 1 March 2024 - present
- Predecessor: Yosam Odur Ebii
- Born: Michael Moses Odongo Okune; March 6, 1965 (age 61); Ibjue Trading Centre, Maruzi, Apac District, Uganda
- Occupation: Cultural leader, civil engineer, public servant
- Education: Makerere University (BS, PhD); University of Surrey (MSc)

Michael Moses Odongo Okune (born 6 March 1965) is a Ugandan cultural leader for the Lango Kingdom and people in Northern Uganda with a title of Won Nyaci of Lango. He was the Cultural Foreign Affairs Minister (Awitim) of Lango and chairman Lango Conference 2012. Odongo is a former Executive Director of the Uganda Road Fund (URF).

== Background and education ==
Eng Odongo was born on 6 March 1965 in the Kongo clan in Ibuje Trading Centre, Maruzi Apac district to Joseph William Okune Onweng (father) and Hellen Acen Odora (mother) at Lira Hospital.

From 1971 to 1978, Odong pursued his primary education from Ibuje Primary School. From 1979 to 1982, he pursued his O-level education at Sir Samuel Baker Senior Secondary School in Gulu District after which he proceeded to St Peter's College in Tororo District for his A-level education in 1983 to1985 and there after, he joined Makerere University where he pursued a Bachelor of Science in Civil Engineering in 1985 to1989. He also pursued further studies in engineering where he earned a Master's degree in Civil Engineering in 2003 from the same institution.

In addition, Okune has a Master of Business Administration (MBA) and a second Master's in Bridge Engineering from University of Surrey in the United Kingdom in 2005 and a PhD in Civil Engineering from Makerere University in 2009. His engineering qualifications also consist of being a Fellow of the Institution of Civil Engineers in the UK.

== Career in engineering and public service ==
Okune began his professional career in 1989 within Uganda’s Ministry of Works and Transport. He was a district engineer in Lango sub-region in the early 1990s. His experience in infrastructure development attracted him to be appointed as an Executive Director of the Uganda Road Fund (URF) in 2009 and served for ten years until 2019. In 2014 to 2020, he was Chairman for Engineers Registration Board Uganda, chairman Uganda National Cultural Centre 2015 to 2018. Okune served as a Commissioner in the Ministry of Works and Transport from 2021 to 2024.

== Cultural leadership ==
Okune was elected Paramount Chief of Lango, a traditional title also known as Won Nyaci, on 1 March 2024. He was elected following decades of participation in issues of culture, such as his previous appointment as the Cultural Foreign Affairs Minister (Awitim) of Lango and chair for the 2012 Lango Conference. He was gazetted by the Government of Uganda on 2 November 2024 as Paramount Chief.

His swearing-in was conducted on 5 February 2025 in an open inauguration at the High Court in Lira, with legal challenges still pending. His election had previously been revoked by the High Court in a ruling which termed the process "illegal, null and void." A stay was subsequently ordered by the Court of Appeal to enable Okune to go ahead with his swearing-in pending the appeal. The court battle was sparked by competing contestants for the Lango Cultural Foundation, resulting in a long leadership battle.

Despite the controversy, the Ugandan Minister of Gender, Labour, and Social Development, Betty Amongi, confirmed that the government recognized Okune as the only legitimate Won Nyaci, reinforcing the state’s official position on his leadership.

== Public engagement and community advocacy ==
As Paramount Chief, Okune has been dedicated to reconciliation and reunification of the Lango people. He has promoted cultural rejuvenation and incorporation of traditional models of leadership in tackling modern issues such as poverty, education, and health. In September 2025, he urged the enhanced mobilization of the community in tackling the over-looked tropical diseases (NTDs) with quotes of enormously exaggerated figures in the Lango sub-region. He called on residents, health professionals, and local leaders to become active participants in preventive healthcare measures and education campaigns.

== See also ==
- Rwot David Onen Acana II
