= Annet Nyakecho =

Ugandan politician

- Born: 27 August 1982 (age 43)
- Citizenship: Ugandan
- Education: Rock View School, Tororo; Nkono Memorial S.S., Kaliro; City High School, Kololo; Makerere University
- Occupations: politician, and business woman
- Employer(s): MTN Head Office; Nutrition and Early Childhood Development Project, Tororo; African Centre for Institutional Development, Kampala; Parliament of Uganda
- Known for: Politics
- Political party: Independent politician
- Other political affiliations: National Resistance Movement
- Spouse: Levi Otim

Annet Nyakecho also known as Okwenye Annet Nyakecho (born 27 August 1982) is a Ugandan politician, business woman, and woman Member of Parliament of Tororo North County, Tororo District. She is an Independent politician. She served as woman MP for Otuke District in the 9th parliament, and in the 10th parliament, she served as the MP for Tororo North. She is currently the Tororo woman member of parliament in the 11th Parliament of Uganda.

After the creation of Otuke district in 2009, this gave her the opportunity and in 2011, she was the aspirant for the district woman seat but did not win. She later stood and won for her first term (in the ninth parliament) on the seat on an National Resistance Movement ticket as the youthful MP beating seven other contestants although she had no plans of joining of politics.

== Early life and education ==
Nyakecho was born on 27 August 1982. In 1994, she completed her Primary Leaving Examinations at Rock View School, Tororo. In 1998, attained her Uganda Certificate of Education from Nkono Memorial S.S., Kaliro. In 2000, she was awarded a Uganda Advanced Certificate of Education from City High School, Kololo and later joined Makerere University for bachelor's degree in Development Studies (2008).

== Career ==
=== Early career ===
Nyakecho was employed as the Research Assistant at MTN Head Office(2000), Nutrition and Early Childhood Development Project, Tororo (2001–2002), and African Centre for Institutional Development, Kampala (2002–2003).

=== Political career ===
Nyakecho served at the Parliament of Uganda as the Member of Foreign Affairs Committee(2011–2013), Member of Budget Committee (2011–2013), Member of Legal and Parliament Affairs Committee (2013–2013), and Vice Chairperson Committee of Science and Technology (2015–2016). She also served as the Member of Parliament at the Parliament of Uganda in the ninth, tenth and eleventh parliament.

She served as the chairperson Parliament's Information, Communication and Technology Committee (ICT) but was later dropped from the position by the government Chief Whip Ruth Nankabirwa and replaced by Dokolo North MP Paul Amoru.

Annet Nyakecho, her husband Levi Otim, brother and many others who were found at the home of former Security Minister, Lt. Gen. Henry Tumukunde were arrested and detained. She was the national coordinator of Lt. Gen. Henry Tumukunde 2021 presidential campaign.

== Additional role ==
She served at the Parliament of Uganda as the member on Public Accounts Committee, and Committee on Public Service and Local Government.

== Personal life ==
She is married to Levi Otim. She is a Christian of the Anglican faith.

== See also ==
- List of members of the eleventh Parliament of Uganda
- List of members of the tenth Parliament of Uganda
- List of members of the ninth Parliament of Uganda
- National Resistance Movement
- Independent politician
- Otuke District
- Tororo District
- Ruth Nankabirwa
- Paul Amoru
