= Annet (given name) =

The given name Annet is shared by:

== In arts and media ==
- Annet Artani (born 1976), Greek-American singer and songwriter
- Annet Mahendru (born 1985), American actress
- Annet Malherbe (born 1957), Dutch actress
- Annet Nandujja (born 1959), Ugandan musician and composer
- Annet Nieuwenhuyzen (1930–2016), Dutch actress
- Annet Schaap (born 1965), Dutch writer and illustrator

== In politics ==
- Anita Annet Among (born 1973), Ugandan politician
- Annet Bertram (born 1959), Dutch senior civil servant and politician
- Annet Katusiime Mugisha (born 1974), Ugandan politician
- Annet Nyakecho (born 1982), Ugandan politician and businesswoman

== In other fields ==
- Annet de Clermont-Gessant (1587–1660), Maltese prince and military leader
- Annet Morio de L'Isle (1779–1828), French and Dutch brigade commander
- Annet Nakawunde Mulindwa, Ugandan businesswoman
- Annet Olivia Nakimuli (born 1975), Ugandan physician
- Annet Negesa (born 1992), Ugandan runner
- Annet Schepel (1844–1931), Dutch educator
