= Jack Herbert Driberg =

British anthropologist

- Born: April 1888
- Died: 1946 (aged 57–58)
- Known for: The Lango: A Nilotic Tribe of Uganda
- Awards: Wellcome Medal for Anthropology (1931)

Jack Herbert Driberg (April 1888 – 5 February 1946) was a British anthropologist. He was a part of the Uganda Protectorate and published The Lango: A Nilotic Tribe of Uganda in 1923.

== Personal life and education ==
Driberg was born in April 1888. He attended Lancing College. He also attended Hertford College. He died on 5 February 1946.

== Professional work ==
Driberg became involved in the Uganda Protectorate in 1912. In 1921 he became involved in service in Anglo-Egyptian Sudan. He wrote The Lango: A Nilotic Tribe of Uganda in 1923. He left Sudan in 1925. He moved back to London, England and attended the London School of Economics. He became faculty in the anthropology department at the University of Cambridge. In 1939 he began serving during World War II.

=== The Lango: A Nilotic Tribe of Uganda ===
While in the Uganda Protectorate, Driberg lived with the Langi people in Uganda. In 1923, he wrote The Lango: A Nilotic Tribe of Uganda about his experience. The book is an ethnographic look at the Langi. It includes fables and a Lango-English dictionary.
