= Lake Kwania =

Lake in Northern Region, Uganda

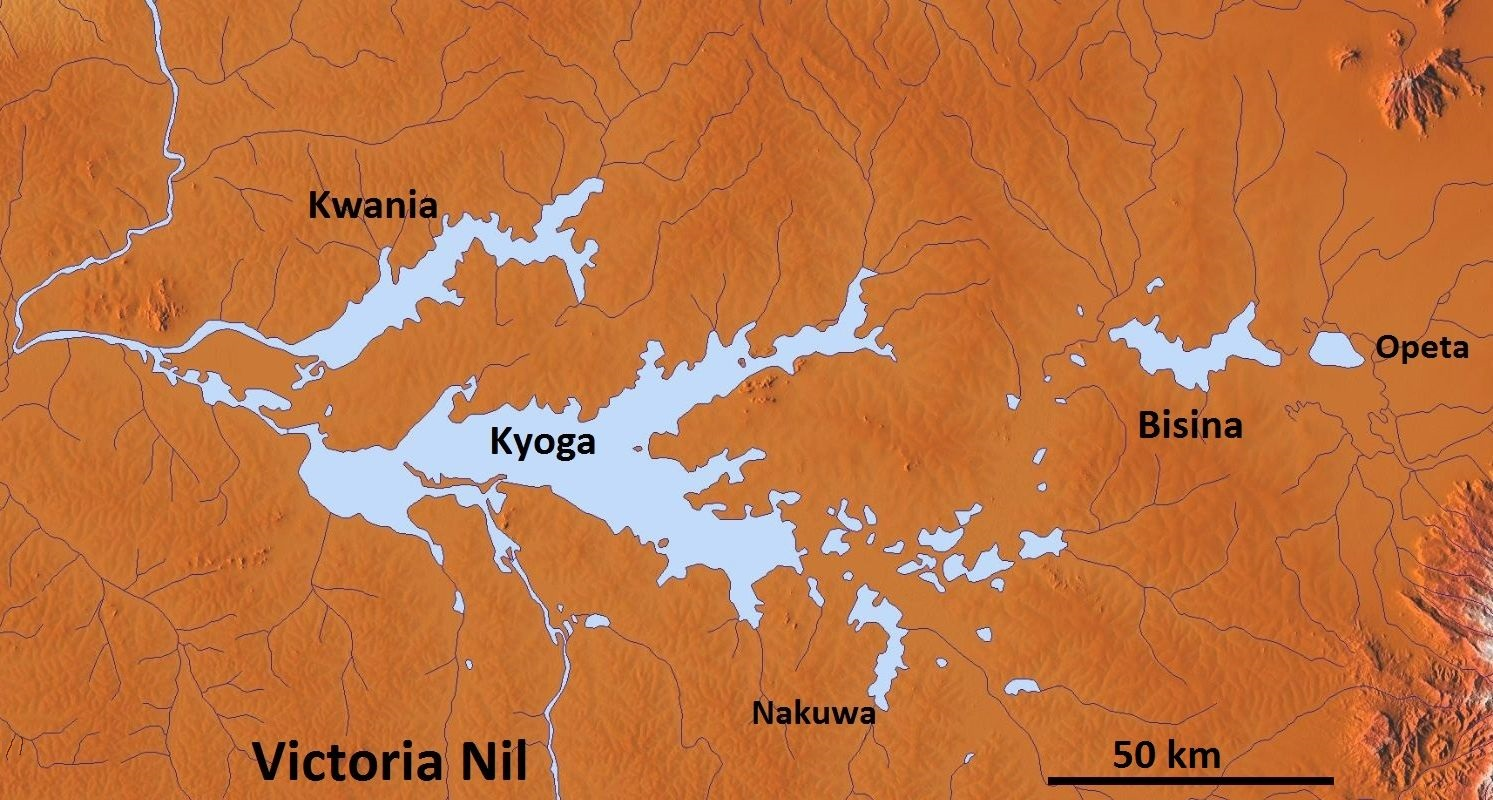
- Kyoga Lake Complex with the Kwania (top left)

- Location within Uganda
- Location: Apac, Amolatar & Lira districts
- Coordinates: 1°43′N 32°42′E
- Primary inflows: Adip and Abalang rivers
- Primary outflows: Victoria Nile
- Basin countries: Uganda
- Max. length: 66 kilometres (41 mi)
- Surface area: 540 square kilometres (210 mi^{2})
- Average depth: 4 metres (13 ft)
- Max. depth: 5.4 metres (18 ft)
- Surface elevation: 1,033 metres (3,389 ft)
- Settlements: Apac, Lira

Lake Kwania is in the districts of Lira, Apac and Amolatar in the Northern Region of Uganda. It is part of a large wetland along the White Nile (Victoria Nile) between Lake Victoria and Lake Albert. The wetland, which includes Lake Kwania, the even larger Lake Kyoga, and other water bodies and swamps, consists of about 3,420 square kilometres (1,320 mi^{2}) of open water and about 2,180 square kilometres (840 mi^{2}) of permanent swamps. Of this total, Lake Kwania accounts for 540 square kilometres (210 mi^{2}), about 16 percent, of the open water.

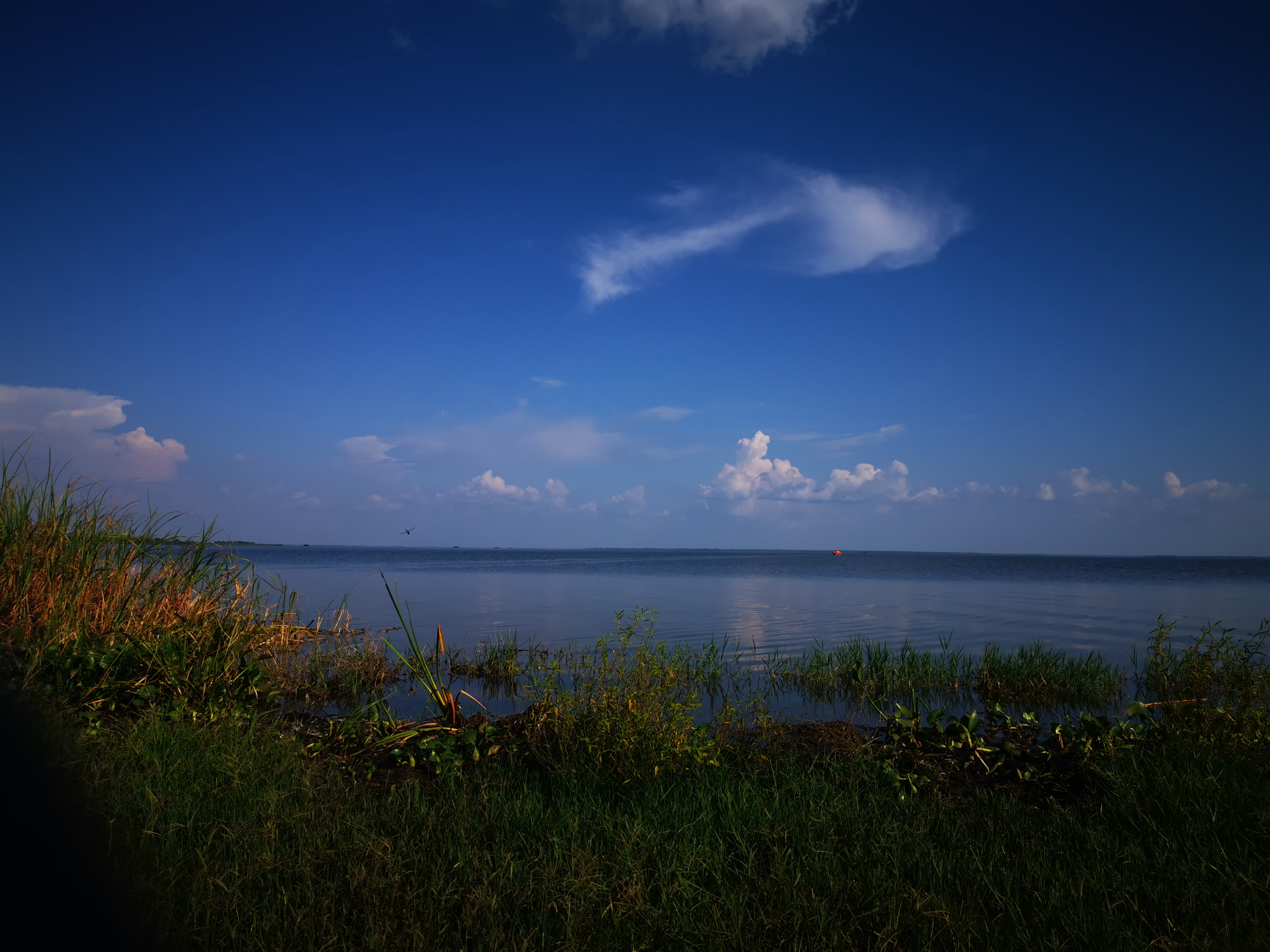
Photo of Kwania Lake

The lake is heavily fished for Nile tilapia and Nile perch, introduced species that caused declines in native fish populations after the mid-1950s. By the late 1960s, the introduced species made up about 80 percent of the commercial catch from Lake Kyoga, Kwania's near neighbor. Although civil unrest, overfishing, and infestations of water hyacinth (later brought under control) at times curtailed the fishing, by the mid-1990s Lake Kwania had 34 landing sites and a fleet of about 1,500 planked canoes operated by about 4,500 fishers.

== Flora and fauna ==
Beds of papyrus circle the lakes and dominate the surrounding swamps. Sections of these beds drift from shore and become floating islands. A variety of aquatic plants grow profusely around and in the lakes. Grasses and trees are found in parts of the watershed that are less often flooded.

Mammals that frequent the lake include the African clawless otter, marsh mongoose, hippopotamus, spotted-necked otter, and sitatunga (a swamp-dwelling antelope). Crocodiles, hunted to near extinction near the lakes, are scarce. In addition to the introduced fish—Nile perch and Nile tilapia—that dominate the lakes, native species including Victoria tilapia, also live in these waters.
