= Won Nyaci of Lango =

Title of the king of Lango, Uganda

- Emblem of the Lango Kingdom

Incumbent
- Odongo Okune since 1 March 2024

Details
- Style: His Royal Highness
- First monarch: Yekosofati Atoke Engur
- Formation: 1960
- Abolition: 17 September 1967 – 2003
- Website: lcf.or.ug

The Won Nyaci of Lango is the ruler and paramount chief of the Lango Kingdom in central Uganda. As paramount chief, the Won Nyaci serves as the unifying cultural and traditional leader of the Lango people. The crown is elective, being elected for life by the hereditary chiefs of the 149 Lango clans.

== History ==
Historically, the Lango people operated based on a decentralised clan-network, without hereditary chiefs or a royal structure. When Lango came under British colonial administration in the late 19th century, the British began a process of centralisation by establishing centralised chiefdoms, attempting to export the Buganda model. A Lango monarchy would however not come into being until shortly before independence, in 1960. At this time, the office of the British-appointed District Commissioner, who had previously overseen the government of the Lango District, was abolished and replaced as the head of the district government by the new post of Won Nyacu, to be elected by and from the Lango chiefs. Upon Uganda's independence in 1962, the Laloyo Maber was officially recognised as the "constitutional head" of the Lango district within Uganda's new federal framework, making the Won Nyaci eligible for election as President of Uganda.

The Mengo Crisis of 1966 brought down the 1963 constitution with Prime Minister Milton Obote overthrowing Kabaka Mutesa II of Buganda, who was then serving as Uganda's ceremonial President. Obote subsequently declared a republic on 17 September 1967, and abolished all the country's monarchies.

The Ugandan government under Yoweri Museveni allowed for the restoration of Uganda's monarchies as ceremonial cultural institutions in 1993. It took until 2003 however for the clan chiefs of Lango to agree on the constitutional framework for the new kingdom and on a candidate for paramount chief. Eventually, Yosam Odur Ebii was elected Won Nyaci in 2003.

Ebii announced his abdication from the throne in 2024, aged 98. His abdication triggered a succession dispute, with two rival claimants eventually claiming succession. The succession dispute eventually ended with Odongo Okune officially recognised as Won Nyaci by the Ugandan government.

== Powers ==
As head of state of the Lango Kingdom the Won Nyaci exercises significant powers over the government of the kingdom. The Won Nyaci appoints the Prime Minister of Lango and the members of the Lango cabinet. Under Ugandan law, the traditional monarchs and kingdoms are prohibited from exercising political powers or being involved in politics. As such, the Won Nyaci and Lango Kingdom's powers are relegated to cultural and development matters.

== List of Won Nyaci ==
- Yekosofati Atoke Engur: 1960-1964
- Ben Otim: 1964-1967
- Position abolished: 1967-2003
- Yosam Odur Ebii: 2003-2024
- Odongo Okune: 2024-present
