= Prime Minister of Lango =

- Emblem of Lango

- Flag of Lango
- Incumbent; Willy Okullu since 5 February 2026
- Style: The Right Honourable
- Appointer: The Won Nyaci
- Term length: At His Royal Highness' pleasure

The Prime Minister of Lango is the head of government of the Lango Kingdom, one of the traditional kingdoms within Uganda. The Prime Minister is subordinate to and appointed by the monarch of Lango, the Won Nyaci. The Prime Minister chairs the Lango cabinet of ministers, exercises the day-to-day governance of the kingdom, and acts as a spokesman for the Won Nyaci.
