= Dokolo =

- Location in Uganda
- Coordinates: 01°55′07″N 33°10′12″E
- Country: Uganda
- Region: Northern Uganda
- Sub-region: Lango sub-region
- District: Dokolo District
- Elevation: 3,540 ft (1,080 m)

Population (2014 Census)
  - Total: 19,810

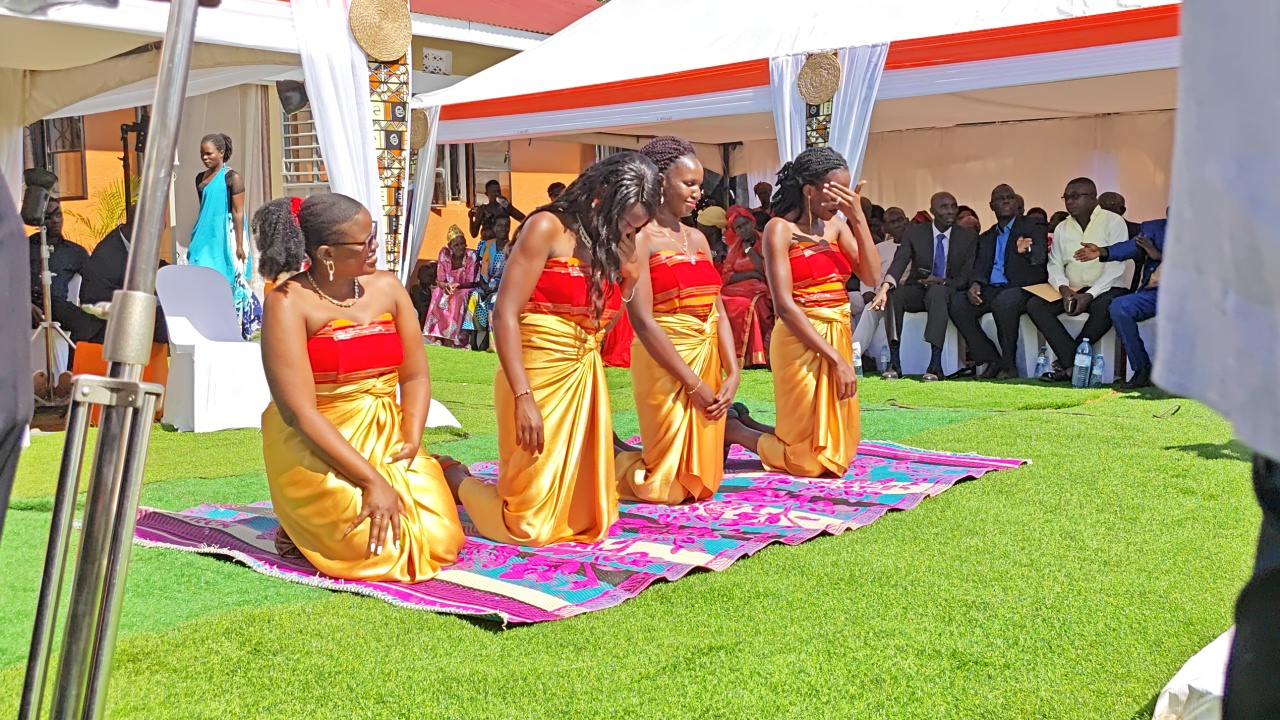
Lango traditional marriage in Dokolo

Dokolo is a town in the Northern Region of Uganda. It is the main municipal, administrative, and commercial centre of Dokolo District.

== Location ==
Dokolo is located approximately 60 kilometres (37 mi), by road, southeast of Lira, the largest city in the sub-region. This is approximately 334 kilometres (208 mi), by road, northeast of Kampala, the capital of Uganda and the largest city in the country. Dokolo lies on the main highway, A-104, between Lira and Soroti. The coordinates of the town are 1°55'07.0"N, 33°10'12.0"E (Latitude:1.9186; Longitude:33.1700).

== Population ==
The 2002 national census estimated the town's population at 13,200. In 2010, the Uganda Bureau of Statistics (UBOS) estimated the population at 17,500. In 2011, UBOS estimated the mid-year population at 18,100. The 2014 national census put the population at 19,810.

In 2015 the population of the town was projected at 20,500. In 2020, the mid-year population of Dokolo Town Council was projected at 23,700. It was calculated that the town's population grew at an average annual rate of 2.9 percent, between 2015 and 2020.

Historical population
Year	Pop.	±%
2002	13,200	—
2010	17,500	+32.6%
2011	18,100	+3.4%
2014	19,810	+9.4%
2015	20,500	+3.5%
2020	23,700	+15.6%

== Points of interest ==
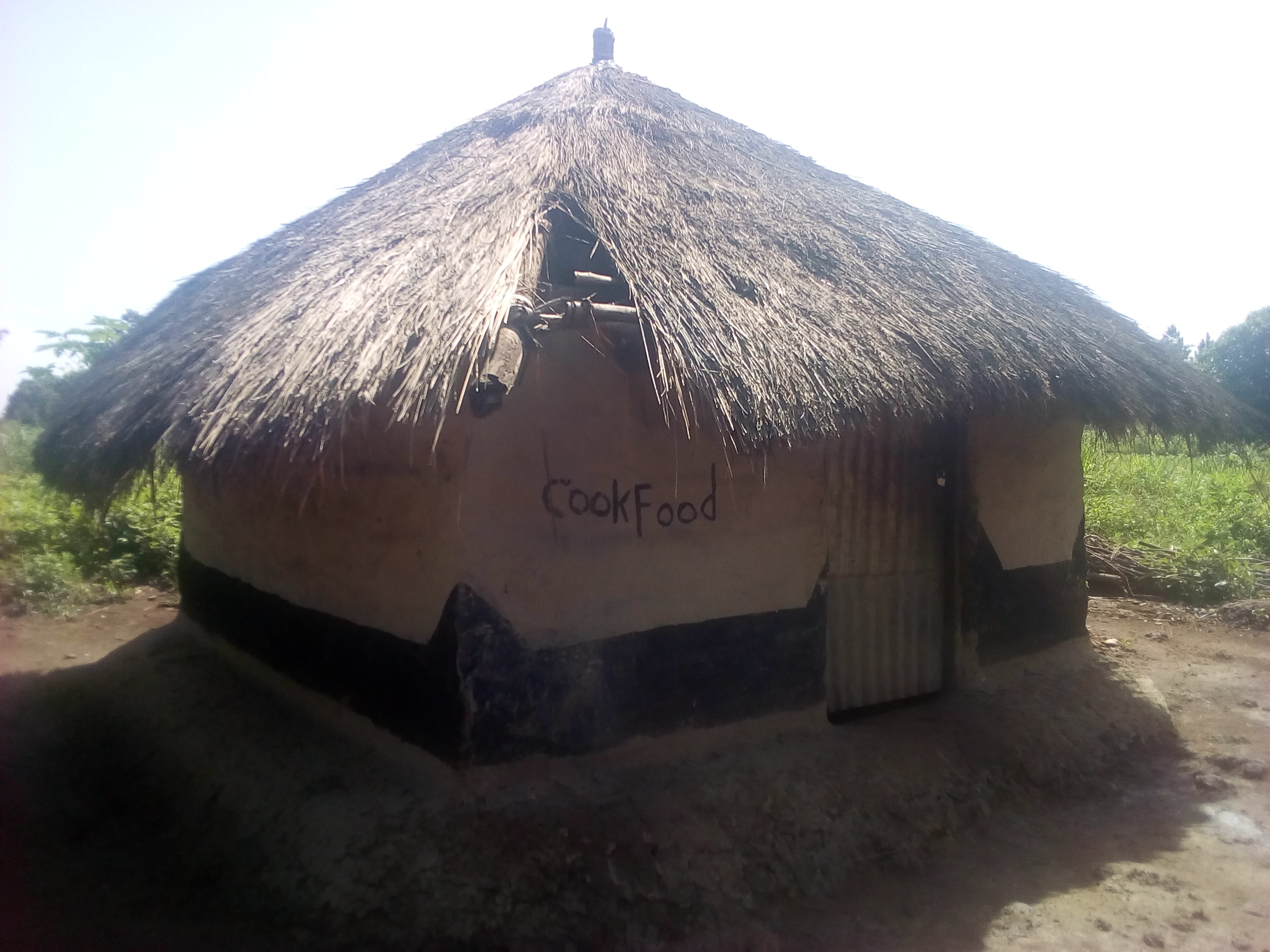
A grass thatched house in Agwata, Dokolo district

The following additional points of interest lie within the town limits or close to the edges of town:

- the offices of Dokolo Town Council
- Dokolo central market
- Dokolo Health Centre IV
- a branch of DFCU Bank
- Lango Broadcasting Service
- Dokolo FM Radio Station

The Soroti–Dokolo–Lira Road passes through town in a general southeast to northwest direction.

== Notable people ==
- Okello Oculi, novelist and poet

== See also ==
- Langi people
- List of cities and towns in Uganda
