= Uganda Road Fund =

Uganda government agency

Coordinates: 00°19′35″N 32°35′01″E

- URF

Agency overview
- Formed: 2008
- Jurisdiction: Uganda
- Headquarters: Road Fund HeadQuarters, PPDA-URF Towers; Plot 39 Nakasero Road, Kampala, Uganda
- Agency executive: Andrew G Naimanye, Executive director
- Parent agency: Uganda Ministry of Works and Transport
- Website: roadfund.ug

The Uganda Roads Fund (URF) is a government agency mandated to finance routine and periodic maintenance of public roads in Uganda. Established by an Act of Parliament in 2008, the agency raises monies through various means, independent of general government taxation regimes, and disburses those funds to repair and maintenance agencies, based on agreed work programmes.

== Headquarters ==
The headquarters of the Uganda Road Fund are located on PPDA-Road Fund Towers, at Plot 39, Nakasero Road, on Nakasero Hill, in Kampala, Uganda's capital city. The geographical coordinates of URF headquarters are 0°19'35.934"N, 32°34'36.764"E (Latitude:0.3264539; Longitude:32.5771994).

== Overview ==
The URF collects money from road users and attempts to equitably distribute those funds to repair and maintain public roads in an approximate ‘fee-for-service’ arrangement. The Fund is supposed to be independent of the general taxation mechanism of the government.

The agencies that repair and maintain Ugandan roads and therefore benefit from the monies accrued by URF include: (a) Uganda National Roads Authority (b) Kampala Capital City Authority (c) other designated agencies responsible for maintenance and repair of District, Urban and Community Access Roads.

== Sources of funds ==
The various sources of revenue for URF include (i) fuel levies (ii) vehicular transit fees (iii) vehicular road licenses (iv) axle load fines (v) toll fees (vi) weight and distance charges on heavy commercial vehicles (vii) traffic and road safety fines.

== Governance ==
The affairs of the agency are supervised by an 8-member board of directors:

1. Mr Amajuru Simon Madraru: Chairperson
2. Phoebe N Muathe: Member
3. Hannington Ashaba: Member
4. Dorothy Nseka Kiyaga: Member
5. Tony B. Kavuma: Member
6. Gad Twesigye: Member
7. Alex Onen: Member
8. Andrew G Naimanye, PhD: Executive Director

== See also ==
- Transport in Uganda
- List of roads in Uganda
- Uganda National Roads Authority
- Uganda Ministry of Works and Transport
