= Lango people =

Ugandan ethnic group

Lango

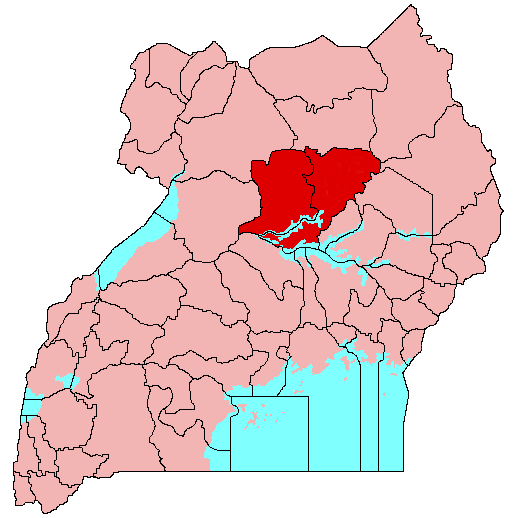
- Lango sub-region

Total population
- 2,131,495

Regions with significant populations
- Uganda

Languages
- Lango dialect, English

Religion
- Christianity

Related ethnic groups
- Other Ateker peoples, Lango people (South Sudan)
- Current Paramount Chief is Michael Moses Odongo Okune who succeeded Yosam Odur Ebii

The Lango people are an ethnic group in north-central Uganda, reportedly belonging to the Ateker peoples. They live in a region that covers the area formerly known as the Lango District until 1974, when it was split into the districts of Apac and Lira, and subsequently into several additional districts. The current Lango region, which is co-terminus with the Lango Kingdom, now includes the districts of Amolatar, Alebtong, Apac, Dokolo, Kole, Lira, Oyam, Otuke, and Kwania.

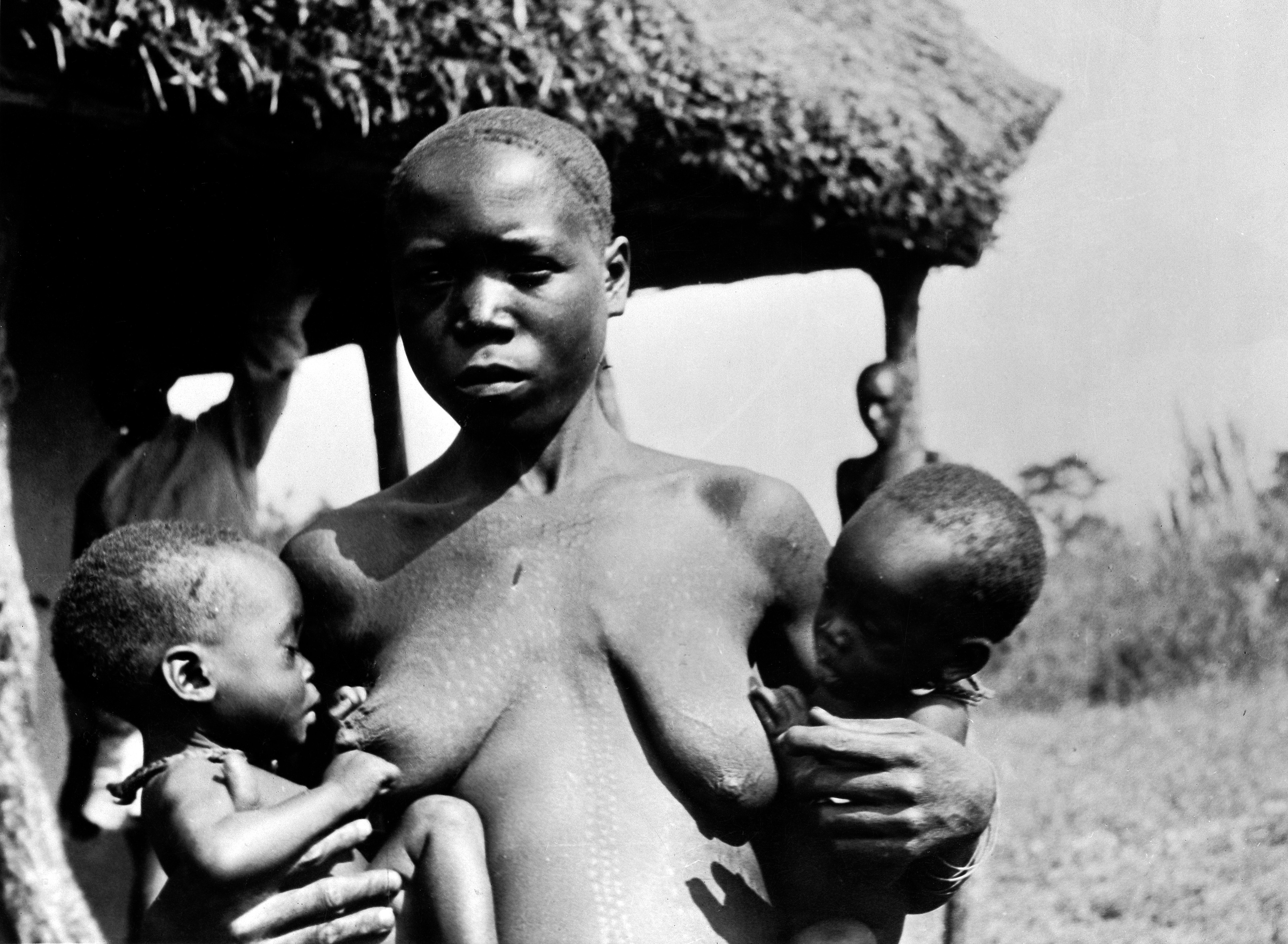
A Lango woman suckling twins

The Lango speak the Lango language, an Eastern Sudanic language. Although the language is classified as related to the Luo languages, several authors have rejected ethnic ties of the Lango to Luo peoples.

On 27 to 29 November 2024, the Lango participated in a reunion with other Ateker peoples. The government of Uganda hosted this event.

== Early history ==
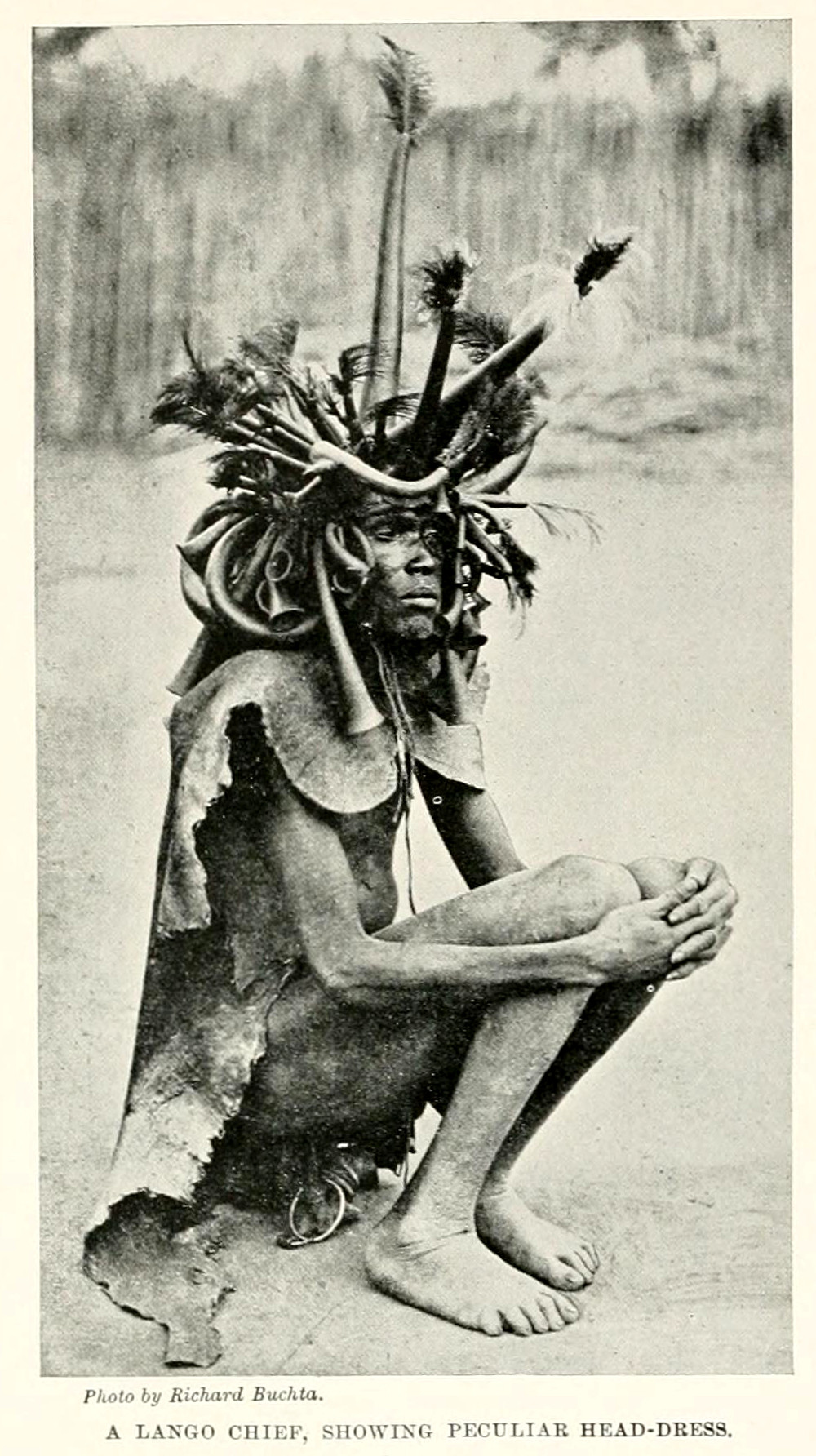
A Lango chief with an elaborate headdress. Photo published in 1902.

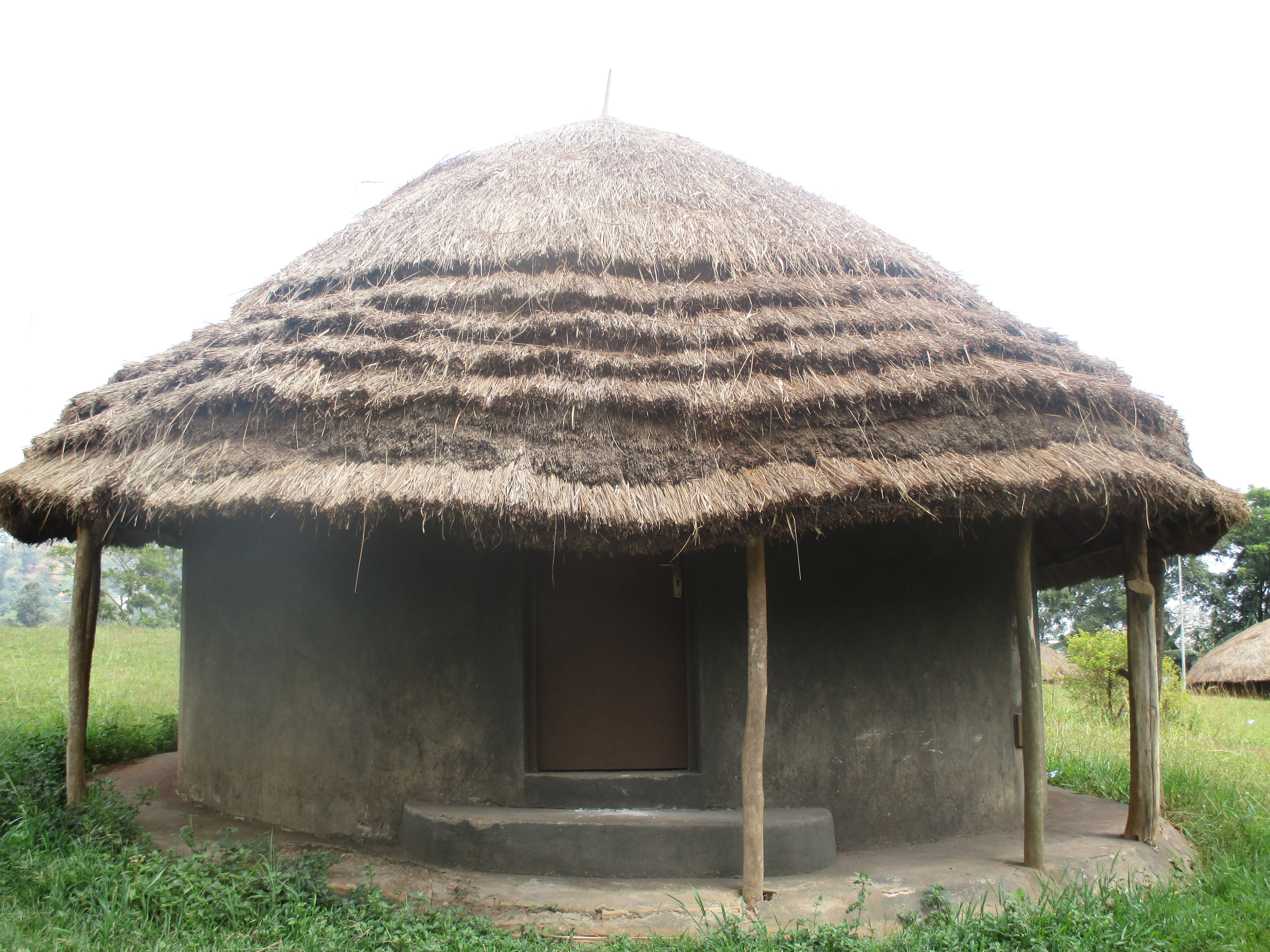
Lango house

The Lango oral tradition states that they were part of the "Lango race" during the migration period. This group later split into several distinct groups before entering Uganda (see Tarantino, Odwe, Crazollara, Uzoigwe). The name “Lango” is found in Teso, Kumam, Karamojong, Jie, and Labwor vocabularies, reflecting that how these groups once used to belong to the Lango race.

Hutchinson (1902) states:

"One of the chief nations of the late kingdom of Unyoro are the Lango (Lango, Longo) people, who although often grouped with the Nilotic Negroes, are really of the Galla stock and speech. They form, in fact, an important link in the chain of Hamitic peoples who extend from Galla-land through Unyoro and Uganda southwards to Lake Tanganyika. Their territory which occupies both banks of the Somerset or Victoria Nile between Foweira and Magungo, extends eastwards beyond Unyoro proper to the valley of the Chol, one of the chief upper branches of the Sobat. They still preserved their mother tongue amid Bantu and Negroid populations, and are distinguished by their independent spirit, living in small groups, and recognizing no tribal chief, except those chosen to defend the common interest in the time of war" (p. 360).

Hutchinson (1902) adds:

"The Lango is especially noted for the care bestowed on their elaborate and highly fantastic head-dress. The prevailing fashion may be described as a kind of a helmet... Lango women, who amongst the finest and most symmetrical of the Equatorial lake regions, wear little clothing or embellishments beyond west-bands, necklaces, armlets, and anklets" (p. 360).

== Icaya (Isaya) Ogwangguji, M.B.E. ==
Rwot Ogwangguji was born in 1875 in Abedpiny village in Lira District (Okino, Patrick, and Odongo, Bonney). He was the son of a Rwot (chief) – Rwot Olet Apar, the leader of the Oki clan. His first administrative chief title was the Jago (sub-chief) of Lira. In 1918, he was elected county chief (Rwot) by Erute county, Lango. He continued as Rwot of Erute county until 28 February 1951, and was later on promoted to the title of Rwot Adwong (Senior Chief). Rwot Ogwangguji is known as a chief who bridged "old Lango" into "new Lango" through his extensive work history during a period of many changes in the 20th century in Uganda. He was awarded the M.B.E. in the New Year's Honors in 1956 and subsequently retired in December 1957.

== Military ==
Driberg described Lango people as:

"brave and venturesome warriors who have won fear and respect of their neighbours...not being idle witnesses to watching of the misfortunes of their neighbours...treating facts of life with no sense of false modesty..."

The Lango army was united under one military leader chosen from available men, and all had to agree to be led by him. These military leaders would lead the Lango army against other groups. Their authority ended when the war was over, and they all returned to their clans and resumed their daily occupations and were not entitled to any special benefits. Famous military leaders were Ongora Okubal, who brought the Lango to their present land, Opyen who succeeded Ongora Okubal and was followed by Arim Oroba, and Agoro Abwango. Agoro Abwango led his men to fight the Banyoro and was killed in Bunyoro. The Lango oral literature has it that as the soldiers who went to help Kabalega retreated towards the Nile, they helped Kabalega and Mwanga, the deposed King of Bunyoro and Buganda respectively cross the Nile River. They were moved along the northern corridor of Lake Kwania. At the time, a warrior called Obol Ario who had conquered much of the northern part of the lake was there. It's believed he helped smuggle the two deposed kings towards Dokolo, where they settled at Kangai. Obol Ario of Apac Okwero Ngec Ayita Clan eventually settled at Amac where he later died and was buried.

== Land tenure ==
Land in the pre-colonial era was common land, and any untilled area belonged to the first person or family who tilled it, and it was passed on to the eldest son. "Land which had not been cultivated in the past could be tilled by any family, and, when once it had been tilled, the community regarded it as the property of the family whose ancestor first cultivated it." Traditional land tenure is still widely used in rural areas.

== Culture ==
Although many Lango practice Islam or Christianity, the influence of traditional beliefs still plays a significant role in the religious lives of the Lango. In traditional Lango myth, each individual has a guardian spirit and metaphysical soul. Additionally, ancestral cults and belief in the supreme god, Jok, played a large role in the religion.

Primary occupations of the Lango people include hunting, farming and raising livestock.

=== Dance ===
The Lango people have several traditional dances. These include Okeme and Abuda which are very popular and performed during cultural functions, weddings or other ceremonies.

=== Sexuality ===
In pre-colonial Lango culture, mudoko dako, or effeminate males, were treated as women and could marry men.

== Lango clans ==
The Lango people have over 149 registered clans with the Lango Cultural Foundation, an institution mandated with the powers to organize, control and represent all clans in the Lango communities.

The clans are united into the Lango Kingdom, a traditional institution and monarchy headed by the Won Nyaci of Lango.

== Notable people ==
- Milton Obote, second president of Uganda following independence
- Jane Aceng, Minister of Health of Uganda since 2016
- Betty Amongi, Minister of Gender, Labour and Social Development since 2021
- Benes Ayo, communist activist
- Peter Ogwang, Minister of State for Sports
- Acen Dorcus, Women's Representative of the Alebtong District since 2021
- Denis Hamson Obua, Chief Whip of the Parliament of Uganda since 2022
- Michael Moses Odongo Okune, current Paramount Chief of the Lango people
