= Apac =

Ugandan town

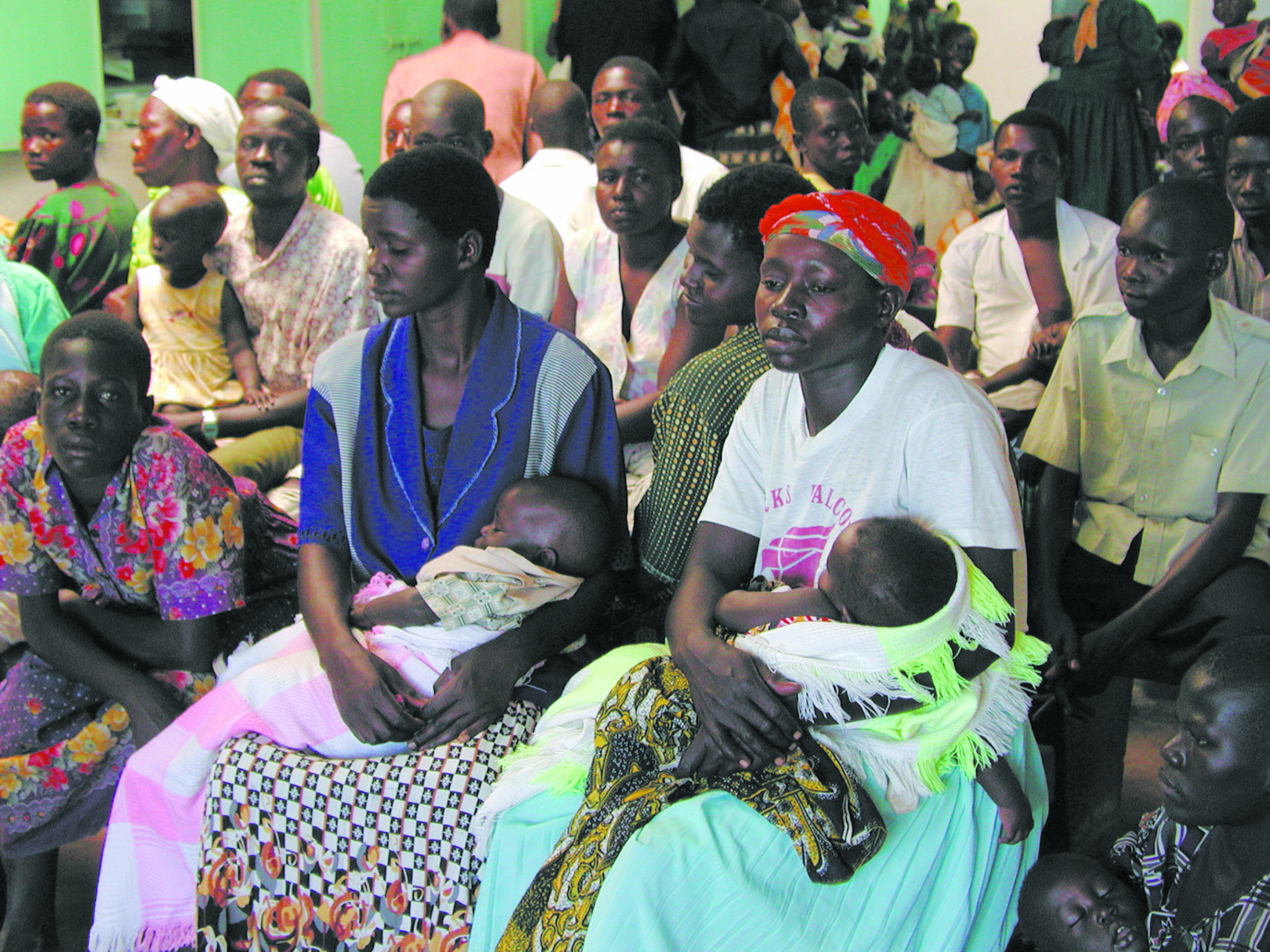
- Patients at Apac Hospital

- Location in Uganda
- Coordinates: 01°59′06″N 32°32′06″E
- Country: Uganda
- Region: Northern Uganda
- Sub-region: Lango sub-region
- District: Apac District

Government
  - Mayor: Jimmy Okello (2016)
- Elevation: 3,540 ft (1,080 m)

Population (2024 Census)
  - Total: 49,593
- Website: Homepage

Apac is a town in Apac District in the Northern Region of Uganda. It is the 'chief town' of the district and the district headquarters are located there. The district is named after the town.

== Location ==
Apac is located approximately 118 kilometres (73 mi), by road, south of Gulu, the largest city in Northern Uganda. This location lies approximately 62 kilometres (39 mi), by road, southwest of Lira, the largest city in the Lango sub-region. The coordinates of the town are:1°59'06.0"N, 32°32'06.0"E (Latitude:1.9850; Longitude:32.5350). Apac Municipal Council is located at an average elevation of 3,540 feet (1,079 m) above mean sea level.

== Population ==
The 2002 national census estimated the population of the town at about 10,140. In 2010, the population of Apac was estimated at 13,300, by the Uganda Bureau of Statistics (UBOS). In 2011, UBOS estimated the mid-year population of Apac at approximately 13,700.

The 2014 national census put the population of Apac at 14,972. At the 2024 census, the population of Apac Municipality was at 49,593.

Historical population
Year	Pop.	±%
1969	378	—
1980	1,716	+354.0%
1991	5,783	+237.0%
2002	10,137	+75.3%
2010	13,300	+31.2%
2011	13,700	+3.0%
2014	14,972	+9.3%
2020	67,700	+352.2%
2024	368,995	+445.0%

== Localities ==
- Putanga

== Points of interest ==
The following points of interest lie in the town or near the town limits: (a) the headquarters of Apac District Administration (b) the offices of Apac Municipal Council (c) Apac General Hospital, a 120-bed public hospital, administered by the Uganda Ministry of Health (d) Alenga Primary School, a public elementary school on the outskirts of town (e) Apac Central Market, the source of daily fresh produce and (f) Rwekunye–Apac–Aduku–Lira–Kitgum–Musingo Road passes through town in a general west to east direction.

== Notable people ==
- Milton Obote, former President and Prime Minister

== See also ==
- Lango sub-region
- Lango people
- Apac District
- Northern Region, Uganda
- List of cities and towns in Uganda
