= Dokolo District =

- District
- District location in Uganda
- Coordinates: 01°55′N 33°10′E
- Country: Uganda
- Region: Northern Region
- Sub-region: Lango sub-region
- Capital: Dokolo

Area
  - Total: 1,072.8 km^{2} (414.2 sq mi)

Population (2012 Estimate)
  - Total: 183,400
  - Density: 171/km^{2} (440/sq mi)
- Time zone: UTC+3 (EAT)
- Website: www.dokolo.go.ug

Dokolo District is a district in the Northern Region of Uganda. The town of Dokolo is its main municipal, administrative, and commercial centre.

== Location ==
Dokolo District is bordered by Lira District to the northwest, Alebtong District to the northeast, Kaberamaido District to the east and south, Amolatar District to the southwest, and Kwania district to the west. It is also covered by lake Kwania from the South to North western part. The administrative headquarters of the district are located approximately 60 kilometres (37 mi), by road, southeast of Lira, the largest city in the sub-region. The coordinates of the district are 01 55N, 33 10E.

== Overview ==
Dokolo District was established by the Ugandan parliament in 2005. It became operational on 1 July 2006. Before that, Dokolo was a county in Lira District. It is part of the larger Lango sub-region, home to an estimated 2.9 million Langi people according to the 2024 national census. The district is a predominantly rural district. The district has a total of 10 sub counties, 60 parishes and 474 villages/cells all in two constituencies ( Dokolo south and North)

== Population ==
The 1991 census estimated the population of the district at 85,000. The 2002 national census estimated the population at 129,400. The district population grew at a calculated rate of 3.6 percent between 2002 and 2012. It has been estimated that the population of the district in 2012 was 183,400.

== Economic activity ==
- Crop growing
- Poultry
- Construction
- Transport and Communication

== Livestock ==
- Cattle
- chicken
- Goat

== See also ==
- Districts of Uganda
