= Apac District =

- District
- District location in Uganda
- Coordinates: 01°59′N 32°32′E
- Country: Uganda
- Region: Northern Region
- Sub-region: Lango sub-region
- Capital: Apac

Area
  - Total: 3,255.9 km^{2} (1,257.1 sq mi)

Population (2012 Estimate)
  - Total: 349,000
  - Density: 107.2/km^{2} (278/sq mi)
- Time zone: UTC+3 (EAT)
- Website: www.apac.go.ug

Apac District is a district in the Northern Region of Uganda. The Town of Apac hosts the district headquarters.

== Location ==
Apac District is bordered by Oyam District to the north-east, Kole District to the north, Lira District to the north-east, Dokolo District to the east, Amolatar District to the south, Nakasongola District to the south-west, and Kiryandongo District to the west. The largest town in the district, Apac, is located approximately 62 kilometres (39 mi), by road, south-west of Lira, the largest city in the Lango sub-region. This location is about 230 kilometres (140 mi), by road, north of Kampala, the capital and largest city of Uganda.

== Overview ==
Sub-counties Teboke, Chegere, Ibuje, Apac, and Akokoro remained as the only sub-counties after Kole and Oyam gaining their district section and Apac Municipality separation. In 2006, Apac District was split and part of it became Oyam District. In July 2010, it was further sub-divided to create Kole District.

== Population ==
The 1991 national census estimated the district population at 162,200. The 2002 national census estimated the population at 249,700. The annual population growth rate in the district between 2002 and 2012 was 3.5 percent. It was estimated that the population in 2012 was 349,000.

== Economic activities ==
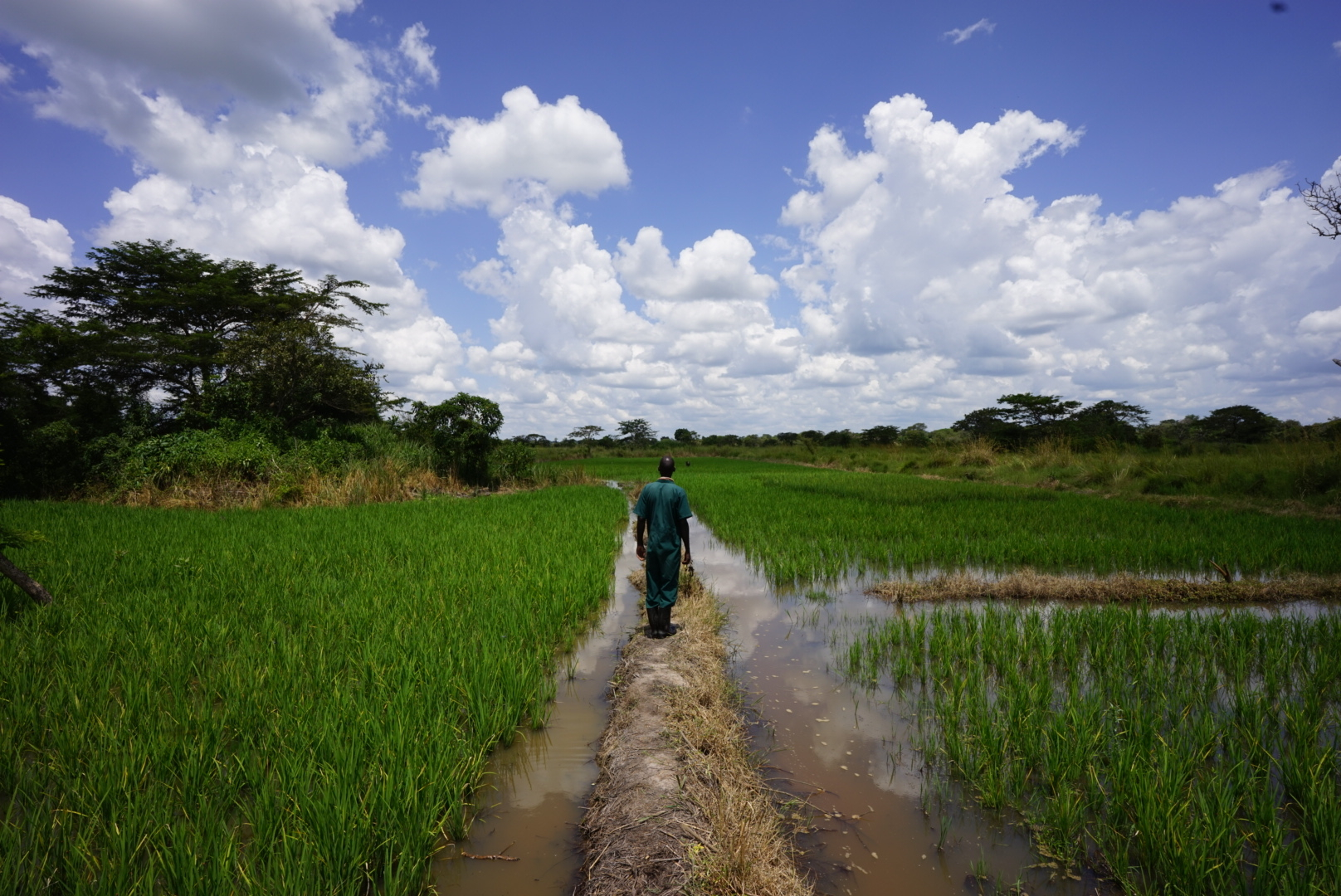
Paddy fields in Apac District

Subsistence agriculture is the major economic activity in the district. An estimated 80 percent of the district's population is engaged in subsistence agriculture but informally, although approximately 75 percent of the work is done by women.

- Tobacco
- Cotton
- Simsim
- Maize
- Beans
- Sunflower
- Potatoes
- Cassava
- Groundnuts

Some fishing is practiced in the south of the district, particularly from Lake Kwania, a component of the Lake Kyoga aquatic system. Fish farming is taking root in the district as well.

According to the 2023/24 District Investment and Enterprise (DINE) Profile published by the Ministry of Finance, there were 1,267 licensed businesses operating in the district. The largest sector was trade, with 935 businesses (73.8% of the total), followed by manufacturing with 89 businesses, and accommodation and food services with 88 businesses.

While agriculture is a common livelihood, it was represented by only 4 licensed businesses, indicating that farming activities are largely informal and at the subsistence level.

== Livestock kept ==
- Cattle
- Goat

== See also ==
- Apac Town
- Kole District
- Districts of Uganda
- Lango sub-region
- Lake Kyoga
