= Justine Khainza =

Ugandan politician (born 1982)

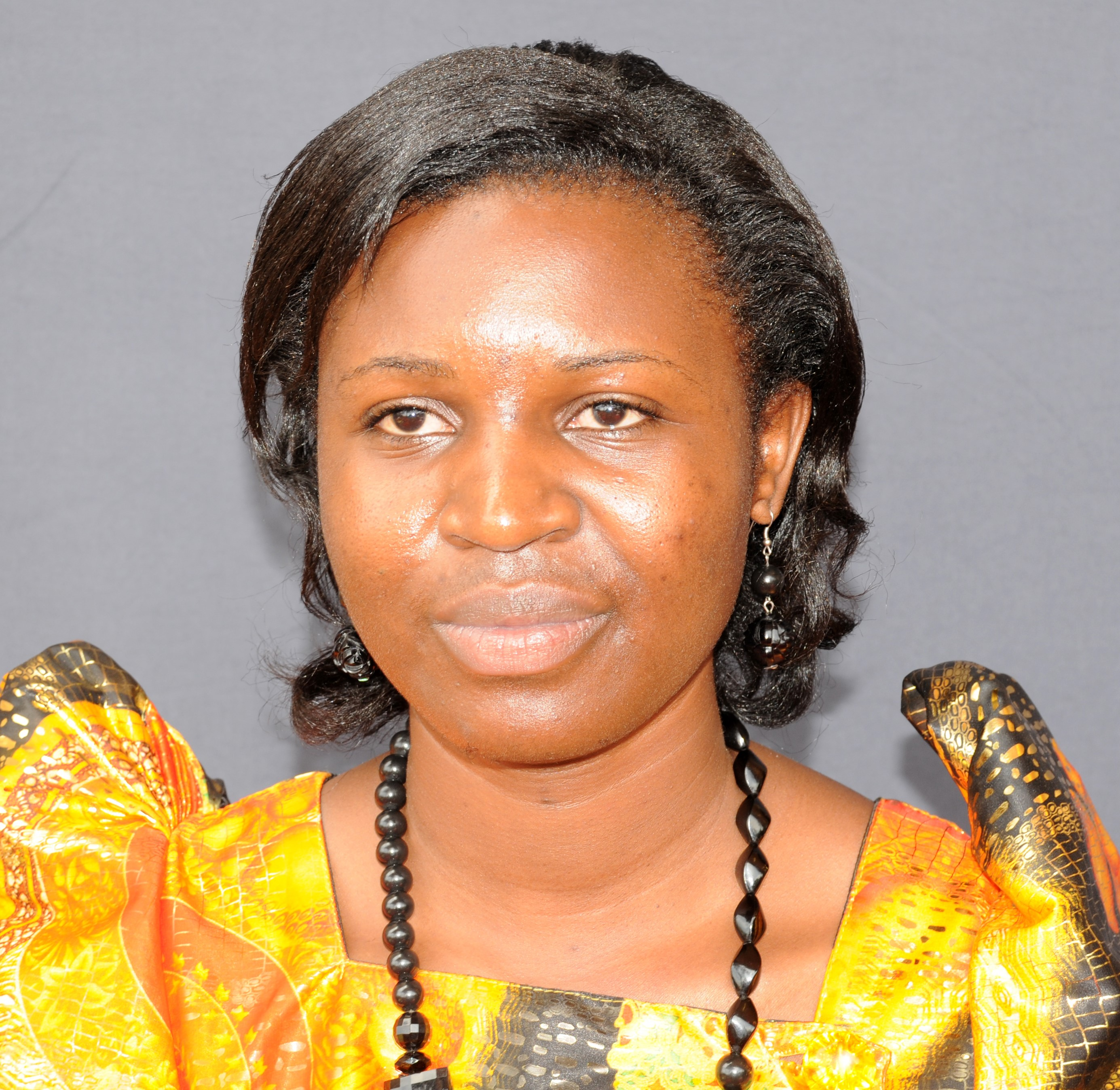
- Born: 30 June 1982 (age 44)
- Citizenship: Ugandan
- Education: Buckley High School, Tororo Girls School, Ndejje S.S, Miracle Bible College, Makerere University, Law Development Centre, Uganda Christian University
- Occupations: Politician and social worker
- Political party: National Resistance Movement (NRM)
- Opponent: Agnes Nandutu

Justine Khainza also referred to as Khainza Justine (born 30 June 1982) is a Ugandan politician and social worker. She was the district woman representative of Bududa District in the 9th and 10th Parliament of Uganda. She is a member of the National Resistance Movement political party. In the 2021 presidential and parliamentary elections, she lost to Agnes Nandutu who is the current district woman representative of Bududa District in the 11th Parliament of Uganda.

== Early life and education ==
Khainza was born on 30 June 1982. In 1996, she sat for her Primary Leaving Examinations from Buckley High School. She received a Uganda Certificate of Education from Tororo Girls School in 2000. In 2002, she obtained a Uganda Advanced Certificate of Education from Ndejje S.S. In 2004, she got a Certificate in Leadership from Miracle Bible College. She graduated with bachelor's degree in Development Studies in 2006 from Makerere University. In 2007, she obtained a Certificate in Administrative Officers Law Course from Law Development Centre, Kampala. Her Master of Public Health Leadership was awarded by Uganda Christian University, Mukono in 2014.

== Career ==
=== Before politics ===
In 2009, Khainza worked as a trainee at the Civil Aviation Authority of Uganda. Between 2006 and 2008, she served as a Coordinator at Mt Elgon Christian Fellowship Association, Bududa.

=== Political career ===
From 2011 to 2021, Khainza served as the Member of the Parliament in the ninth and tenth Parliament of Uganda. In 2020, she was validated by National Resistance Movement elections Tribunals after winning in the pre-elections.

== Other responsibilities ==
She served on the Budget Committee and Committee on Agriculture at the Parliament of Uganda.

== Personal life ==
Khainza is married. Her hobbies are reading, games, and traveling. She has special interest in public health awareness campaign, mobilization of women and youths for economic empowerment, and promoting sports among the youths.

== See also ==
- List of members of the tenth Parliament of Uganda
- List of members of the ninth Parliament of Uganda
- National Resistance Movement
- Agnes Nandutu
- Parliament of Uganda
- Member of Parliament
- Bududa District
