= John Nambeshe =

Ugandan politician (born 1965)

John Baptist Nambeshe
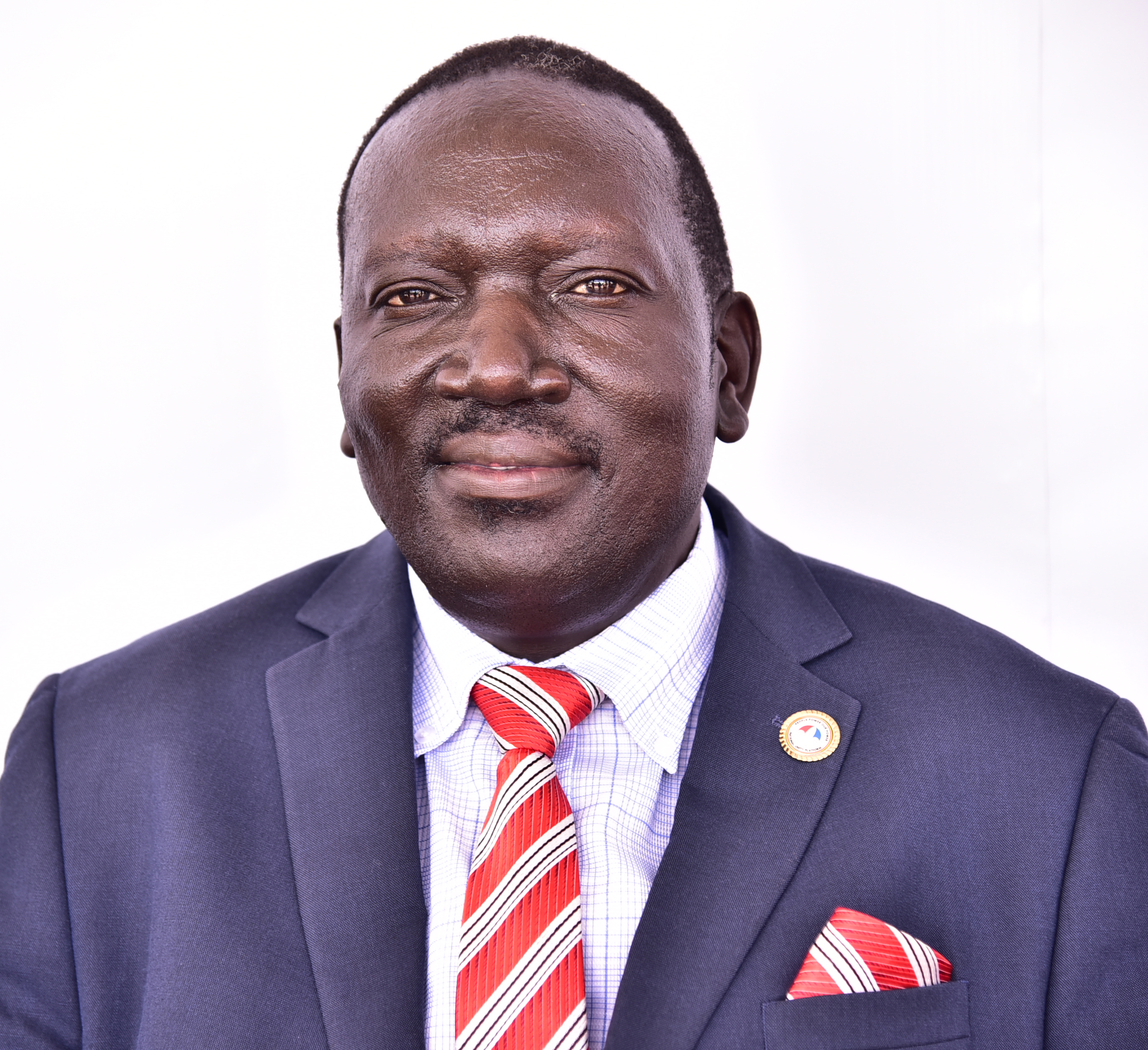
- Nambeshe John Baptist

Member of Ugandan Parliament from Manjiya County
- Incumbent
- Assumed office 2016

Chief Whip of the Opposition
- Incumbent
- Assumed office 2021

Personal details
- Born: November 24, 1965 (age 60)
- Party: National Unity Platform (NUP)
- Other political affiliations: National Resistance Movement (NRM)
- Education: Uganda Martyrs University, Makerere University

John Baptist Nambeshe (born 24 November 1965) is a Ugandan politician and a member of the 12th Ugandan Parliament from Manjiya County in Bududa district currently who served as the Chief Whip of the opposition in the eleventh Parliament and is now serving as the Parliamentary Commissioner in the 12th Parliament. He is a member of the opposition National Unity Platform (NUP) and Deputy President of the party, Eastern Region.

== Early life and education ==
Nambeshe was born on 24 November 1965 in Manjiya County, Bududa District. He attended Shikhuyu Primary School where he earned his First School Leaving Certificate in 1982 before obtaining his O’Level from Bulucheke SS (1986) and A’Level from Nabumali High School in 1989. He earned a diploma in Local Governance and Human Rights from Uganda Martyrs University, Nkozi in 2012 and a bachelor’s degree of Arts in Local Governance and Human Rights in 2014 from Uganda Martyrs University, Nkozi.

Nambeshe later joined Makerere University where he graduated with a Master of Arts in Social Sector Planning and Management in 2020.

Nambeshe worked as a teacher at Bududa Secondary School from 1989 to 1990, and laboratory technician for Jinja College between from 1993 to 1999.

== Political career ==
Nambeshe ventured into politics in 2006 when he contested and was elected as LC3 Chairperson of Bududa Town Council in 2006. In 2011, he was elected as LC5 Chairperson of Bududa District Local Government. In 2016, he was elected to the parliament of Uganda on the ticket of National Resistance Movement and served on the national economy and natural resources committees in the Parliament. He was one of the NRM members of parliament who opposed removal of age limit for president in 2017 in defiance of the party’s instruction to support the removal of age limit to enable President Yoweri Museveni to continue in office. He was criticised by the party official.

He left NRM to join the newly created NUP party. He was later appointed Deputy President of the party, Eastern Region and served as the party’s acting National President for three weeks in 2020 when Robert Kyagulanyi Ssentamu the president travelled United States for official engagement. Nambeshe contested and won the parliamentary seat for Manjiya County in Bududa district on the ticket of NUP in the 2021 general election. He was elected Chief Whip of the opposition following his party’s emergence as the major opposition party in the 11th parliament.

He was appointed Parliamentary Commissioner by NUP in the 12th Parliament of Uganda replacing Mpuuga.

He has been appointed Acting President of NUP.

== See also ==
- Ugandan Parliament
- National Resistance Movement
- Isaac Modoi
- Bududa District
