= Abner Nangwale =

Ugandan politician

Eng. Abner Nangwale

Minister of Works
- In office 1980 – July 1985
- President: Milton Obote

Personal details
- Born: 1932 Bukigai, Bududa District, Uganda
- Died: January 17, 2013 (aged 80–81) Bududa, Uganda
- Party: Uganda People's Congress
- Occupation: Politician, Engineer
- Known for: Expansion of universal education; establishment of Teachers Training Colleges

Abner Nangwale (1932 – January 17, 2013) was a Ugandan politician and member of the Uganda People's Congress. He served as the Minister of Works within the administration of President Milton Obote II from 1980 until July 1985.

== Background ==
Nangwale was born in Bukigai, located in present-day Bududa District, in 1932.

== Political career ==
He was elected as an MP of the Parliament of Uganda for Manjia County, before his appointment as Minister of Works by President Obote in 1980. He served as the Minister of Works within the administration of President Milton Obote II from 1980 until July 1985. As Minister, Nangwale expanded the government's efforts to provide free, universal education to Ugandan students. Nangwale led the construction of several new Teachers Training Colleges (TTC), now called as Parents Teachers Colleges (PTCs), to train new Ugandan teachers and educators.

== Personal life ==
Nangwale was married with a number a number of children including Dorothy Nangwale Oulanyah.

== Death ==
Nangwale died at his home in Bududa, Uganda, on January 17, 2013, at the age of 80. His body was laid to rest in Nalufutu, Bunamubi parish- Bukigai sub-county in Bududa District.

== See also ==
- Milton Obote II
- Maxwell Akora
- Joy Atim
- Omara Atubo
- Kenny Auma
- Sylvia Vicky Awas
- Uganda People's Congress
