= 2024 Ugandan landslides =

Natural disaster in Uganda

- Date: November 28, 2024
- Location: Bulambuli District, eastern Uganda
- Type: Landslide
- Cause: Continuous heavy rainfall
- Deaths: ~30
- Missing: 113+
- Property damage: 125 houses destroyed ~50 acres impacted

On 28 November 2024, heavy rainfall caused a series of landslides to strike six villages in the Bulambuli District, located in mountainous regions of eastern Uganda. The damage caused by the landslides caused the deaths of at least 20 people, with 113 reported by Ugandan police as missing.

== Background ==
In the days leading up to the disaster, Uganda suffered from heavy rainfall that led to a tributary of the Nile located in the northwest of the country to overflow its river banks. The subsequent flooding led to a disaster alert issued from the office of the Ugandan prime minister, and rescue operations to save motorists stranded by the floods. One rescue boat capsized near Pakwach, causing the death of one emergency responder.

== Landslides ==
Heavy rainfall impacting eastern Uganda triggered landslides in mountainous areas of eastern Uganda in Bulambuli District, impacting at least six villages including Masugu. An area of about 50 acres containing residential areas and farmland was destroyed by the landslides, with at least 125 homes buried.

Bulambuli district commissioner Faheera Mpalanyi announced that the landslides had killed roughly 30 people at the time of reporting, with at least one infant among the dead. A report by the Daily Monitor stated that most of the recovered victims were children.

== Response ==
Rescue efforts involving heavy machinery to clear debris were hampered by continuous rainfall in conjunction with mud and debris covering roadways leading to the disaster sites. Video footage of the aftermath in Kimono showed villagers attempting to dig potential survivors and victims out of the rubble.

Irene Muloni, a Bulambuli District MP, stated that the Ugandan government would initiate relocations of residents located in landslide-susceptible regions for as long as heavy rainfall continued.

== See also ==
- 2024 Kiteezi Landfill landslide
- 2010 Ugandan landslide
- 2019 Ugandan landslide
