= Bududa =

Town in the Eastern Region of Uganda

- Map of Uganda showing the location of Bududa
- Coordinates: 01°00′36″N 34°19′54″E
- Country: Uganda
- Region: Eastern Region, Uganda
- Sub-region: Bugisu sub-region
- District: Bududa District
- Elevation: 1,300 m (4,300 ft)

Population (2020 Estimate)
  - Total: 8,700
- Time zone: UTC+3 (EAT)

Bududa is a town in the Eastern Region of Uganda. It is the main municipal, administrative, and commercial center of Bududa District.

== Location ==
Bududa is located on the south-western slopes of Mount Elgon, approximately 35 kilometres (22 mi), by road, south-east of Mbale, the largest city in the Bugisu sub-region. This is about 258 kilometres (160 mi), by road, north-east of Kampala, the capital and largest city of Uganda. The town is located within Mount Elgon National Park. The geographical coordinates of Bududa Town Council are 01°00'36.0"N, 34°19'54.0"E (Latitude:1.010011; Longitude:34.331663). Bududa Town Council sits at an average altitude of 1,300 metres (4,300 ft) above sea level, inside the Mount Elgon Range.

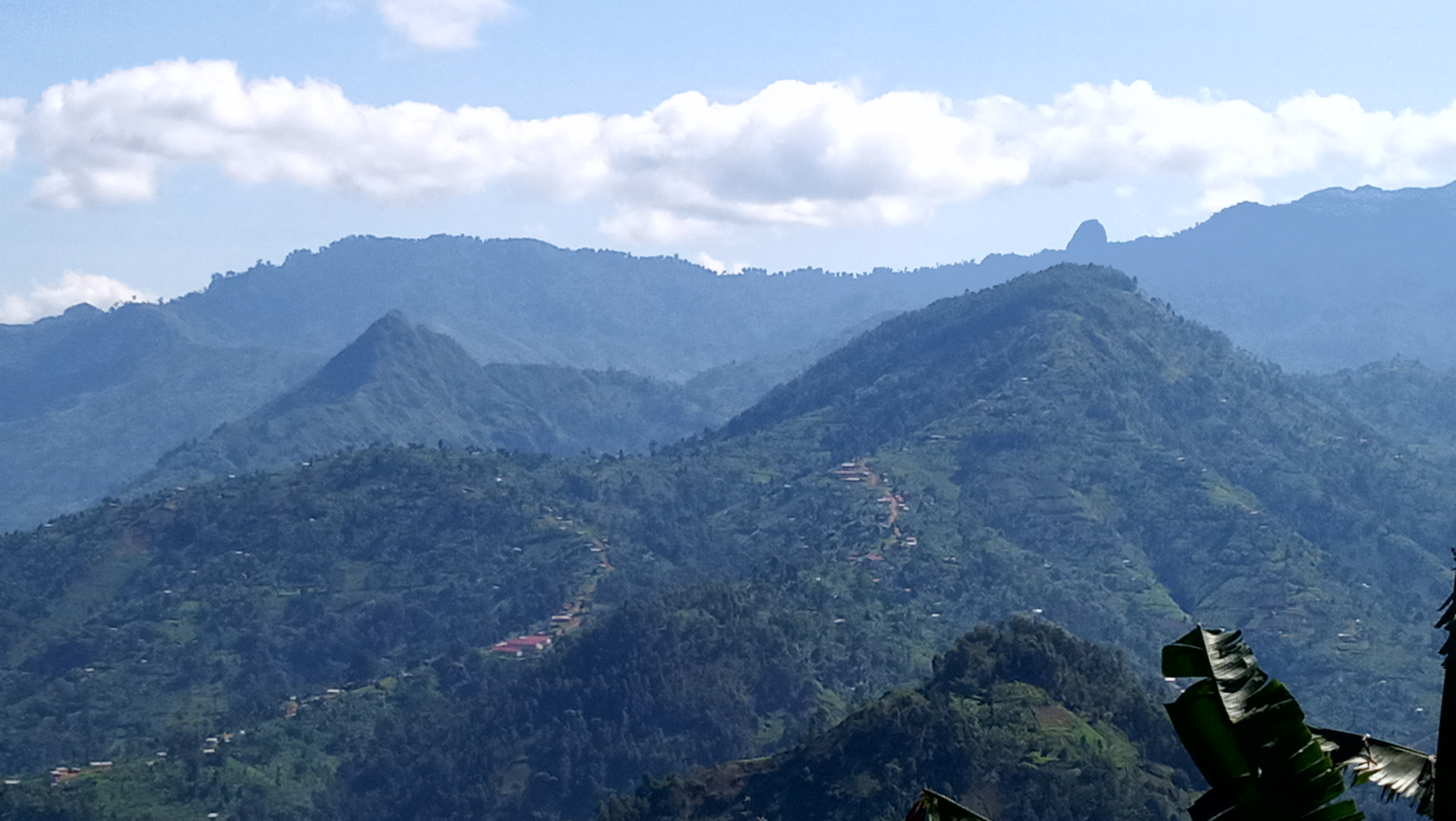
Nusu Ridge in Bududa District.

== Population ==
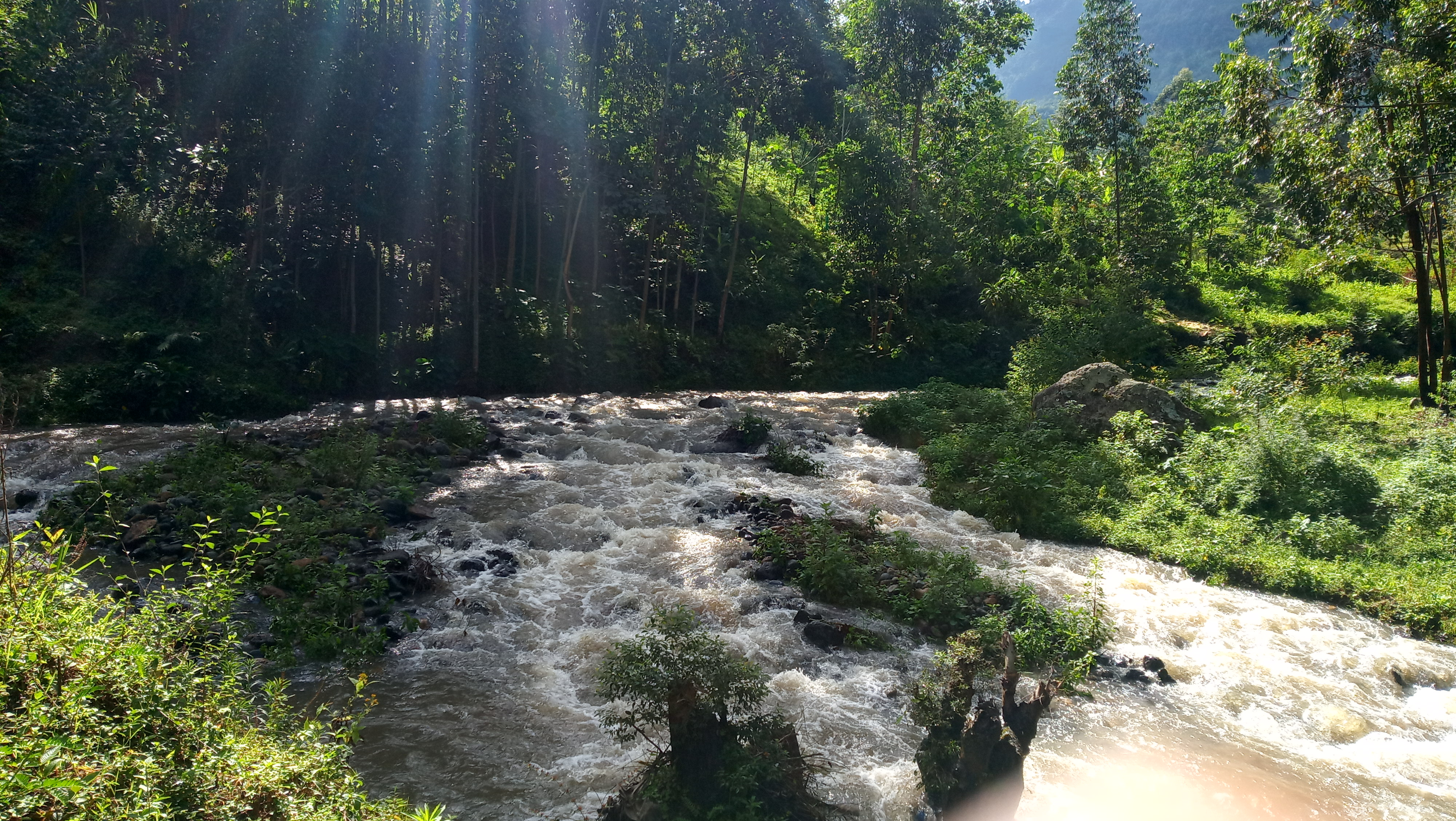
River Manafwa in Bududa District.

In 2015, the Uganda Bureau of Statistics (UBOS) estimated the population of Bududa Town Council at 7,100 people. In 2020, the population agency estimated the mid-year population of the town at 8,700 inhabitants, of whom 4,400 (50.6 percent) were males and 4,300 (49.4 percent) were females. UBOS calculated that the population of the town increased at an average rate of 4.2 percent annually between 2015 and 2020.

Historical population
Year	Pop.	±%
2015	7,100	—
2020	8,700	+22.5%

== Landslides ==
In the 21st century, a number of factors have converged to make the town of Bududa and the surrounding countryside prone to landslides, leading to loss of life and property.

Several mudslides has previously struck the region, with the 2010 Ugandan landslide killing 100 people.

Some of those factors include the volcanic nature of the soils, the steep terrain and the high reproductive rate of the population, putting pressure on the available habitable land. UBOS calculated the average annual growth rate of the population of Bududa District at 4.5 percent annually, on average, between 2014 and 2020. Bududa Town Council was growing faster at 4.6 percent annually, on average, between 2015 and 2020. When many people crowd on the side of a mountain, with loose soils and a lot of rain, catastrophic events may happen.

Another factor in the persistence of these tragedies is the refusal of a large number of residents to relocate away from the vulnerable areas due to lack of proper understanding, political influence and miscalculation.

On 5 June 2019 landslides occurred in Bududa. Several landslides were triggered by heavy rain, killing 5 whilst 50 are believed missing, and leaving an estimated 150 houses destroyed.

== Notable people ==
- Agnes Nandutu, State Minister for Karamoja and Women's Representative for Bududa District in the 11th Parliament (2021–2026)
- Eng Abner Nangwale, Minister of Works from 1980–1985

== See also ==
- Bagisu
- Lugisu
