= Isaac Modoi =

Ugandan Member of Parliament

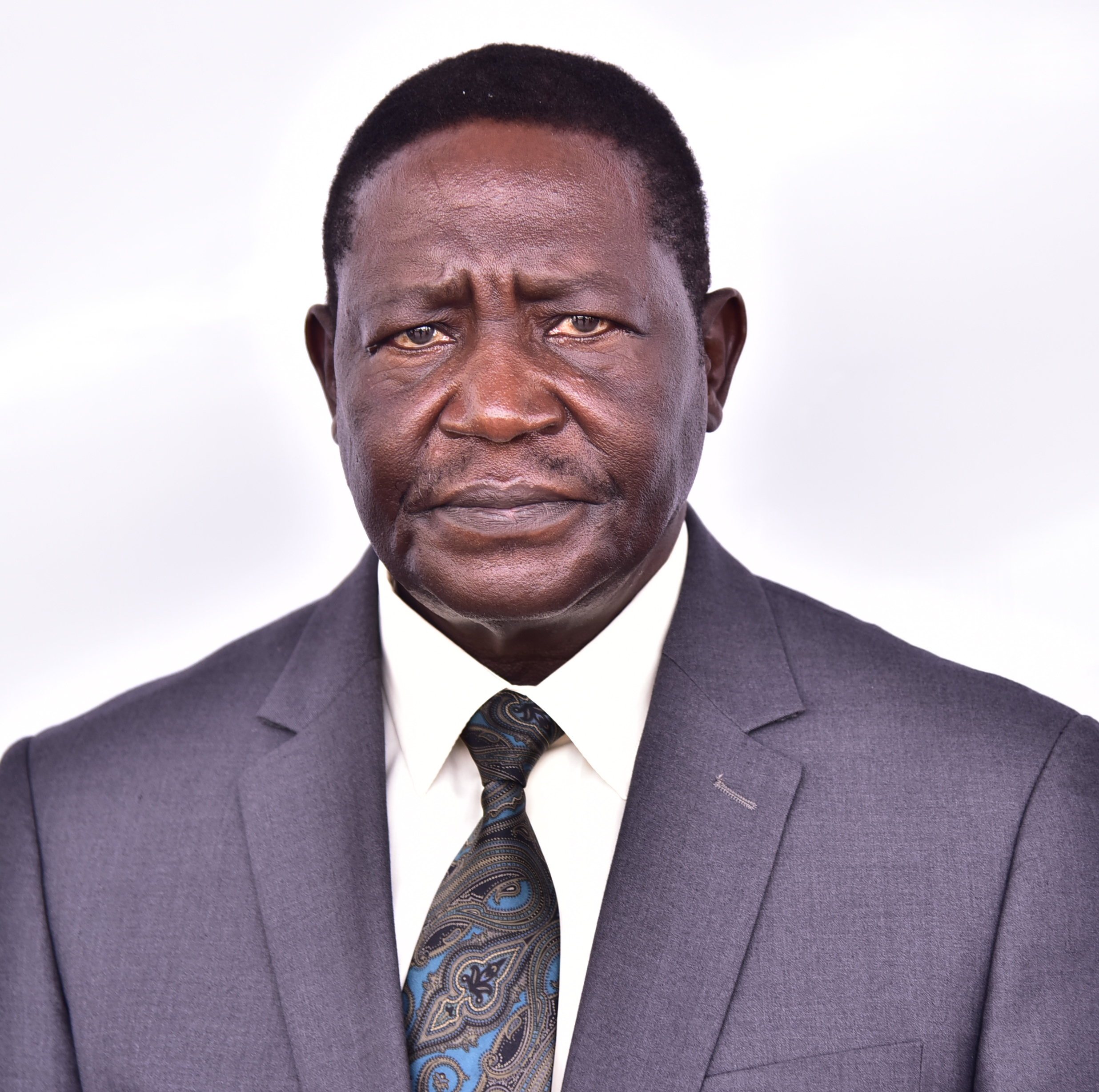

Member of Parliament
- Incumbent
- Assumed office 2021
- Constituency: Lutseshe County, Bududa District

Personal details
- Party: National Resistance Movement

Isaac Modoi is a Ugandan politician and member of Parliament representing Lutseshe County, Bududa District in the Parliament of Uganda. He is a member of the National Resistance Movement (NRM) political party and serves in the 11th Parliament of Uganda.

== Early life ==
Isaac Modoi was born on 17 July 1957.

== Political career ==
Modoi joined national politics during the 2021 general elections in Uganda, where he contested the parliamentary seat for Lutseshe County in Bududa District. In the 2020 NRM party primaries, he defeated the incumbent Member of Parliament, Godfrey Watenga Nabutanyi earning the party flag for the 2021 general elections.He was elected Member of Parliament under the National Resistance Movement (NRM) party ticket.

Following his election, he was confirmed as the elected representative for Lutseshe County in the Parliament of Uganda. He works on the Committee on Public Accounts (Central Government).

He is a member of the National Resistance Movement (NRM).

== Personal life ==
Modoi is married.
