= Sylvia Vicky Awas =

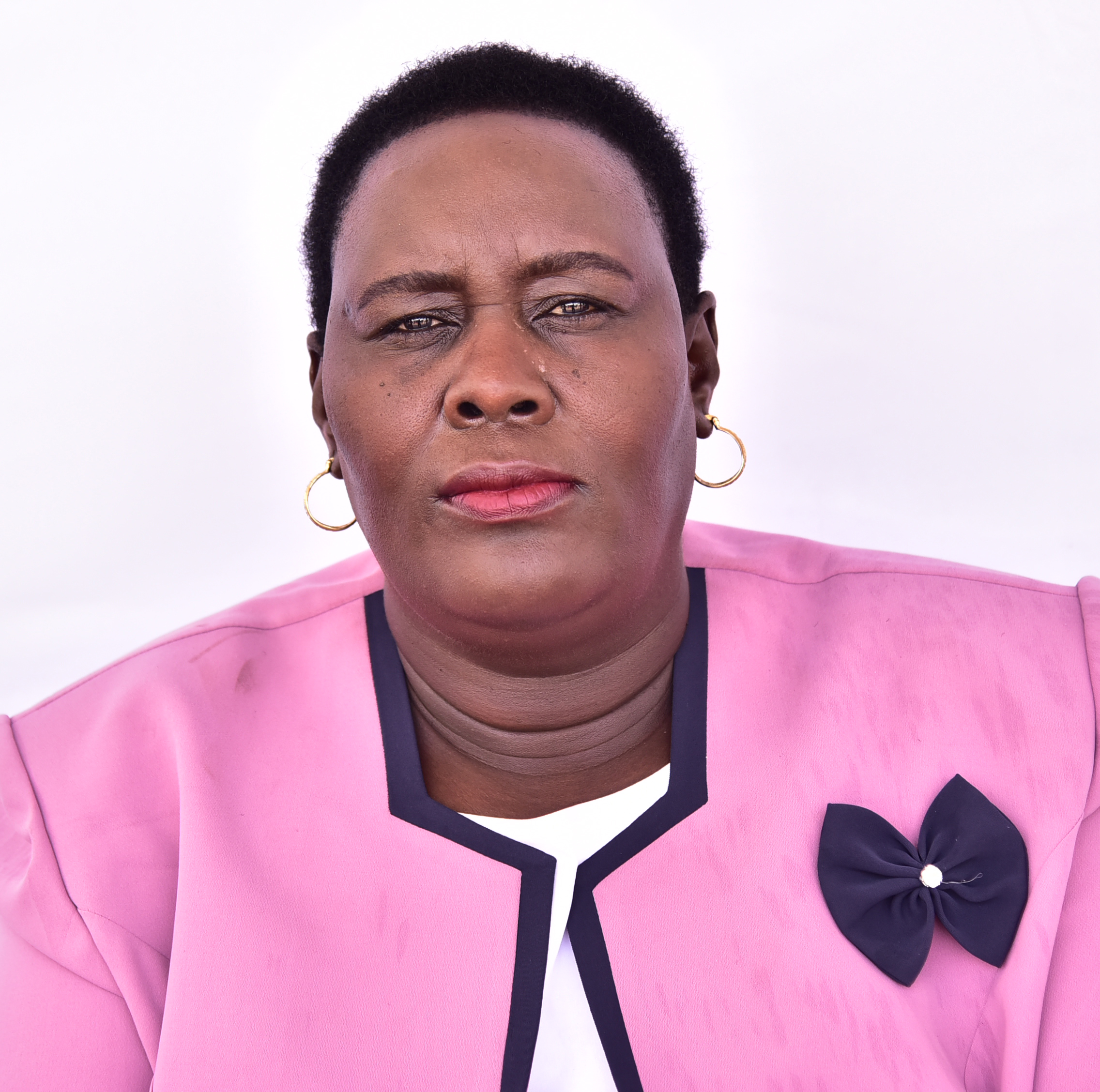
- Sylvia Vicky Awas

Woman Member of Parliament for Nabilatuk District
- Incumbent
- Assumed office 2021

Personal details
- Party: National Resistance Movement

Sylvia Vicky Awas is a Ugandan politician representing Nabilatuk District in Karamoja Sub-region as the Women's Representative at the 11th parliament of Uganda under the National Resistance Movement (NRM) political party.

== Political career ==
Before joining the NRM political party, she was the Uganda People's Congress (UPC) member.

== See also ==
- List of members of the eleventh Parliament of Uganda
- Thomas Tayebwa
- Anita Among
- Faith Nakut
- Agnes Nandutu
