= 2010 Ugandan landslide =

The location of Bududa District within Uganda

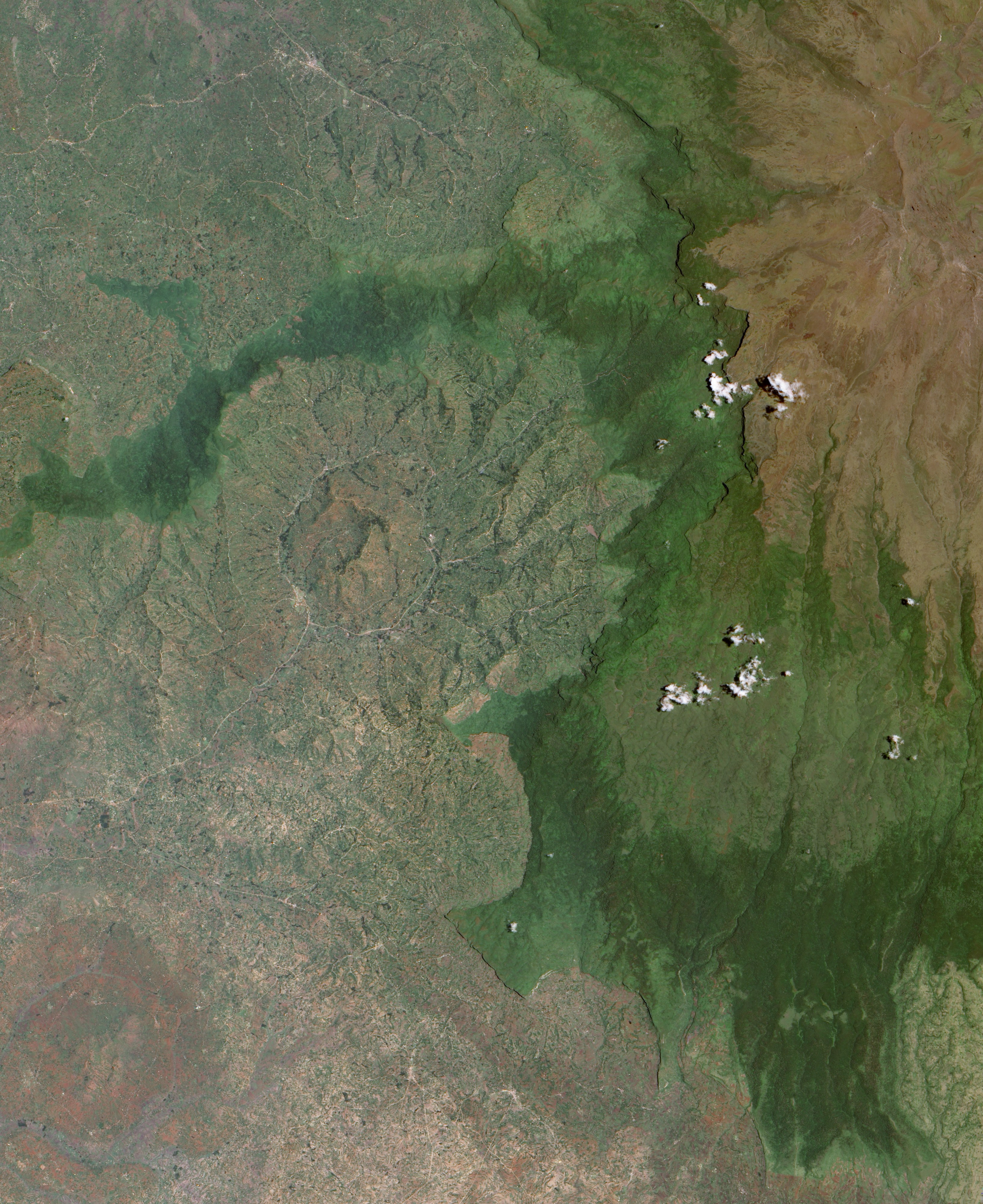
Satellite image of the landslide and surrounding area

The 2010 Ugandan landslide occurred in the Bududa District in eastern Uganda on 1 March 2010. The landslide was triggered by heavy rain between 12 pm and 7 pm that day. At least 100 people were believed to have been killed, and 94 bodies were found.

== Casualties ==
A spokesman for the Ugandan Red Cross stated that rescuers had recovered 50 bodies, whilst a Ugandan government minister has put the death toll at over 100. The chairman of the eastern Bududa district suggested that the death toll could be as high as 300. Hundreds more people are missing and presumed dead, including up to 60 children who took refuge in a nearby health centre that was subsequently destroyed.

== Effects ==
The landslide struck villages on the slopes of Mount Elgon, including Nameti, Kubewo, and Nankobe. with 85 homes being destroyed in Nameti. Many areas in the affected villages were buried by the landslides, with houses, markets, and a church destroyed; many roads were also blocked. Officials and aid workers have warned that there may be further landslides, as heavy rain continues to fall in the region.

In Butaleja, over 6,000 homes from the sub-counties of Kachonga, Masimasa, Kimuntu and Nawangofu were affected by the rains, with two primary schools in Nabehere and Lubembe becoming flooded. The Mbale-Busolwa road was also closed due to flooding. The Red Cross expects further potential floods in the Moroto, Katakwi and Nakapiripirit districts of the country.

== Emergency response ==
Tarsis Kabwegyere, a government minister, stated that a response team had been sent in to help with rescue efforts, whilst the Uganda Red Cross provided doctors. Michael Nataka, the Uganda Red Cross Secretary General, has also stated that the military has been called upon to aid in the rescue operation. Wanjusi Wasieba, a Bududa District Commissioner, said that the rescue effort was being hampered by the poor terrain of the region, which limits the ease of access for emergency vehicles.

The Minister of Disaster Preparedness, Musa Ecweru, has advised people living on affected mountain slopes to evacuate. Those living in lower-lying, flood-prone areas have also been advised to move to safer locations.

Rescue workers had to use hand tools to dig through the mud to rescue survivors. The day following the landslide, soldiers and surviving villagers began rescue work. Military helicopters have begun ferrying survivors to an area 20 kilometres away.

== Causes ==
The landslides followed a period of unusually heavy rain in the region, which is known for its coffee production. The region's climatic conditions normally create a dry period between the wet seasons; however, parts of Uganda and neighbouring Kenya had seen more rainfall than normal that year. Scientists have suggested that global climate change is affecting rainfall patterns in East Africa, with an increase in extreme and unexpected rainfall. Landslides are not uncommon in the region during the wet season, although the scale of this disaster has been described as more severe than even those. Deforestation may have also played a role, said the Ugandan government. Dark green forest grows on the slope above the slide area. A strip of pale green land, free of settlements, separates the forest from the slide. This region had been deforested since 2007, according to the government analysis. On a steep slope, trees anchor the soil. Deforested mountains are very prone to landslides.

== See also ==
- 2024 Ugandan landslides
- Mass wasting
