= Agnes Nandutu =

Ugandan journalist

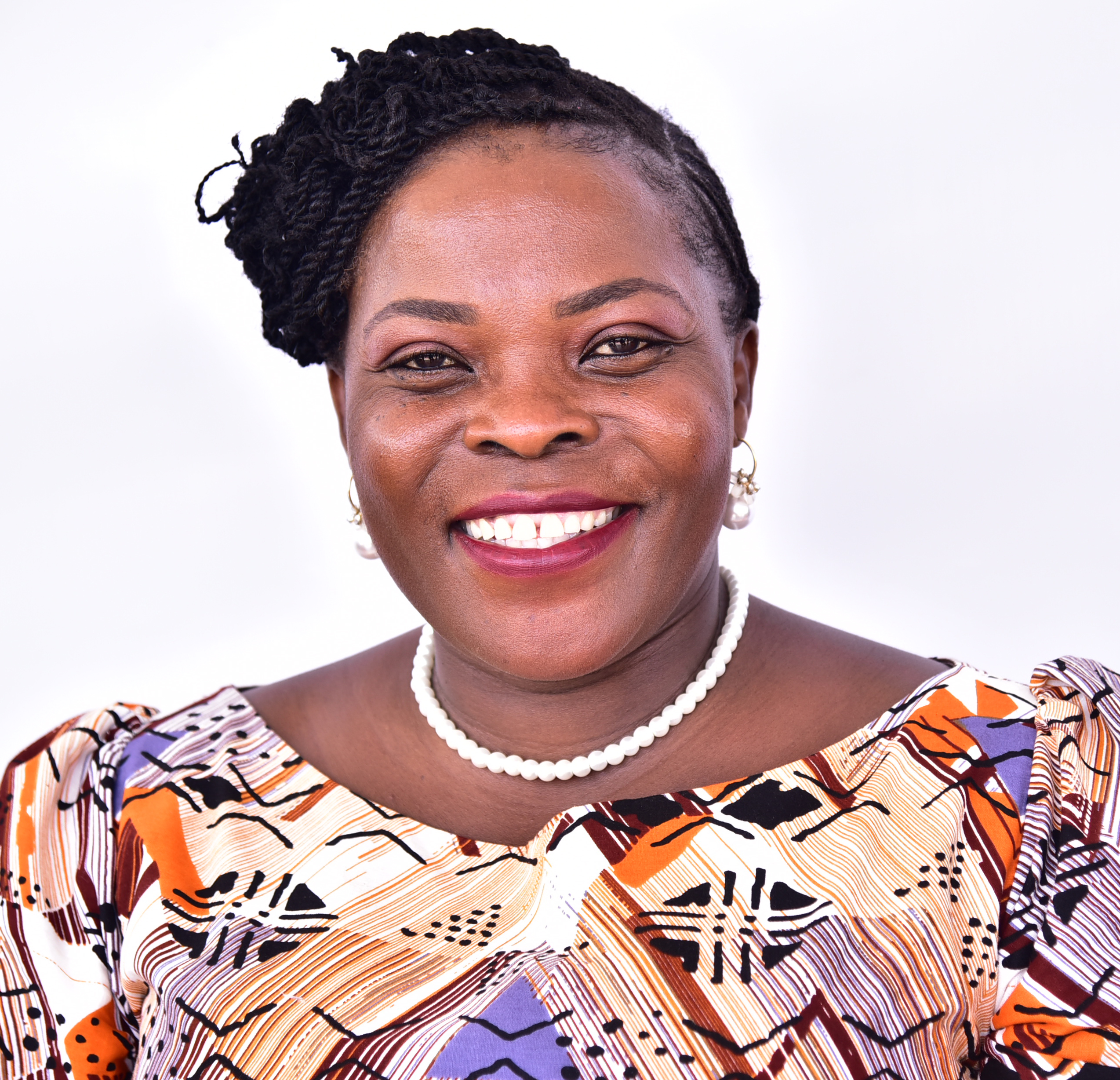

Member of Parliament of Uganda for Bududa District (Woman Representative)
- In office May 2021 – May 2026
- Preceded by: Justina Khainza
- Succeeded by: Agnes Khainza Shiuma

State Minister for Karamoja Affairs
- In office 21 June 2021 – April 2024
- President: Yoweri Museveni
- Preceded by: Moses Kizige

Personal details
- Born: Bududa District, Uganda
- Citizenship: Ugandan
- Party: NRM; Independent (2020–2024)
- Profession: Journalist, politician

Agnes Nandutu is a Ugandan journalist, politician and former State Minister for Karamoja affairs. She served as the Woman Member of Parliament for Bududa District from 2021 to 2026. Nandutu was defeated during the 2026 general election and was succeeded by Agnes khainza Shiuma.

== Early life and education ==
Nandutu was born in Bududa District, Uganda. She belongs to the Bantu ethnic group who are the Gisu people. Nandutu attended Bumwali Primary School for her elementary school education and sat her primary seven here. She then joined Bbulo Girls’ Secondary School. She studied in Uphill College Mbuya where she sat for Senior Four and Six in 2015, though she failed senior Six and repeated in 2017. She then studied at Bubuulo Girls' Secondary School. She completed her high school education at Blucheke Secondary School.

== Career ==
In 1997, she joined Radio Uganda as a reporter. Later, she pursued a diploma in Journalism at Uganda Institute of Journalism and Media studies. She worked at Daily Monitor as a freelance reporter. Between 2002 and 2008, Nandutu worked at Impact FM as a staff reporter before she joined NTV Uganda. She was a senior political reporter at NTV Uganda. Nandutu was also a moderator and a speaker for NTV citizen debate show called "The People’s Parliament." She served as the president of the Parliamentary Journalist's Association from 2011 to 2016. She scripts and narrates the popular satire Friday segment called Point Blank on NTV Uganda. In 2011, she received a Christmas gift from The Observer for her NTV show, Point Blank.

== Legal proceedings ==
During her tenure as the Member of Parliament for Bududa District, Nandutu also served as State Minister for Karamoja from 2016 to 2021. On 19 April 2023, the Karamoja iron sheets scandal came to public attention, revealing that between June and July 2022 she had received iron sheets that formed part of a Shs39.94 billion supplementary allocation from the Office of the Prime Minister. The materials, which were intended for communities in Karamoja, were instead discovered stored at her private residence in Mukono. In her ruling, Justice Jane Kajuga stated that this amounted to illegitimate and illicit possession of government property.

Following the court’s ruling on 8 April 2026, Nandutu was found guilty and deemed deserving of a seven‑year custodial sentence. Her bail was revoked, and she was remanded to Luzira Prison pending delivery of the final judgment.

On Friday, 10 April 2026, Nandutu appeared before the court and apologized to the Government of Uganda and the public for her actions. She requested a more lenient sentence, citing her responsibility for caring for her 80‑year‑old ailing mother and several children whose school fees she pays, stating that she is the only capable provider in her family. She further informed the court that she suffers from a lung blood clot condition that has caused her to collapse on several occasions.

Senior State Attorney Alet Innocent argued that Nandutu should receive a ten‑year ban from holding public office, noting that she committed the offence while serving as a minister. He also proposed a fine of 3.2 million Uganda shillings, equivalent to 160 currency points under Ugandan law. Justice Kajuga, however, observed that Nandutu was a first‑time offender.

== Controversies ==
In 2017, Nandutu was denied accreditation to cover the Parliament of Uganda by the institution’s communications director.

During the 2020 parliamentary campaigns, voters in Bududa pressed Nandutu to present her husband. She declined to do so and instead told listeners on local radio to "find her a suitor", urging them to prioritise effective representation over her marital status. The issue generated public debate. Nandutu later stated in an interview with The Observer that she is a mother of seven children, though she declined to provide further details.

On 10 April 2026, the Anti-Corruption Division of the High Court of Uganda sentenced Nandutu to four years in prison after convicting her of misappropriating government-owned iron sheets intended for impoverished communities in the Karamoja sub-region.

== International Sanctions ==
On April 30, 2024, the UK's Foreign Office announced personal sanctions against Agnes Nandutu and another high Ugandan official under its Global Anti-Corruption sanctions regime for their involvement in significant corruption in relation to illegal appropriation of thousands of iron sheets allocated for housing of the poorest communities in the Karamoja region as part of a government-funded project, making her a subject to an asset freeze and a travel ban.

== See also ==
- Parliament of Uganda
- Member of Parliament
- List of Member of the 10th Parliament of Uganda
- Karamoja sub-region
- Bududa District
- Robinah Nabbanja
- NTV Uganda
- Daily Mornitor
