= Bududa District =

- District
- District location in Uganda
- Coordinates: 01°01′N 34°20′E
- Country: Uganda
- Region: Eastern Uganda
- Capital: Bududa

Area
  - Land: 250.8 km^{2} (96.8 sq mi)
- Elevation: 1,800 m (5,900 ft)

Population (2014 Census)
  - Total: 210,173
  - Density: 838/km^{2} (2,170/sq mi)
- Time zone: UTC+3 (EAT)
- Website: www.bududa.go.ug

Bududa District is a district in the Eastern Region of Uganda. Bududa is the chief town of the district.

== Location ==
Bududa District is bordered by Sironko District to the north, Kenya to the east, Manafwa District to the south, and Mbale District to the west. The district headquarters at Bududa are located approximately 36 kilometres (22 mi), by road, south-east of Mbale, the largest city in the sub-region.

Bududa district is divided into small administrative division which include county, sub county and parish. The County, Sub county.

=== Bushigai county. ===
This county has six sub county namely:

- Bukigai
- Bukigai town council
- Bunatsami
- Bushiribo
- Kikholo town council
- Nabweya

=== Lutseshe county. ===
Sub counties for this county include:

1. Bubiita
2. Bufuma
3. Bukalasi
4. Bulucheke
5. Bumayoka
6. Bumwalukani
7. Bundesi
8. Bushiyi
9. Busiriwa
10. Buwali
11. Kuushu town council
12. Mabono
13. Nalwanza

=== Manjiya county. ===
- Bududa
- Bududa town council
- Bukibino
- Bukibokolo
- Bumasheti
- Bunabutiti
- Bushika
- Nakatsi
- Nangako town council.

== Overview ==
Bududa District was created by an Act of the Ugandan Parliament in 2010. Previously, the district was part of Mbale District.

== Population ==
In 1991, the national population census estimated the district population at 79,200. During the 2002 national census, the population was estimated at 123,100, with an annual growth rate of 4 percent. In 2012, the population of the district was estimated at 180,600. The male to female ratio is 1:1. The major language spoken in the district is Lumasaba. The national population census conducted on 27 August 2014 put the population at 210,173 and in 2024 the population was 268,970.

== 2018 Bukalasi Flood and Mudslide ==
During the 2018 flood, landslides wreaked this mountainous eastern region as the government made plans to move out residents. Like the Bumwalukani landslide of June 25, 2012, the Bukalasi Mudslide and Flood occurred on Thursday, October 11, 2018. It was a market day at Bukigai. Many people had returned from the marketplace and they were relaxing and drinking at Naposhi trading centre when the Bukalasi mudslide suddenly came with water, mud and other debris and deposited them in the trading centre. It is hard to classify this disaster. Is it a flood? Is it a mudslide? Or is it a combination of the two? The disaster attracted immediate attention from the government. For example, the Minister for Disaster Preparedness, Hon. Hillary Onek came and Muwoya Wekhoola David being the District Inspector of Schools led the team to Sume Junior School which had been badly damaged. President Yoweri Kaguta Museveni himself came, went to Naposhi and consoled the people who had gathered at Bukalasi playground. The Senior Four candidates had to be relocated to Bulucheke Secondary School where they did their UCE examinations.

== Education ==
Bududa is the administrative headquarters of Bududa District Local Government which was carved out of Manafwa district in 2006. Bududa Town Council has two primary schools, namely, Manjiya Primary School and Buloli Primary School. According to the Senior Inspector of Schools who is also the District Focal Point Person for Strengthening Education Systems for Improved Learning (SESIL), since 2006, the academic performance of Bududa District Local Government has been improving steadily.

== Economic activity ==
- Irish potatoes
- Rice
- Maize
- Beans

== Livestock ==
- Cattle
- Goats
- Chicken
- Pig

== See also ==
- Bamasaba
- 2010 Uganda landslide
- Bugisu sub-region
- Districts of Uganda
- Eastern Region, Uganda
- Administrative divisions of Uganda
- Parliament of Uganda
