= John Mulimba =

Ugandan politician

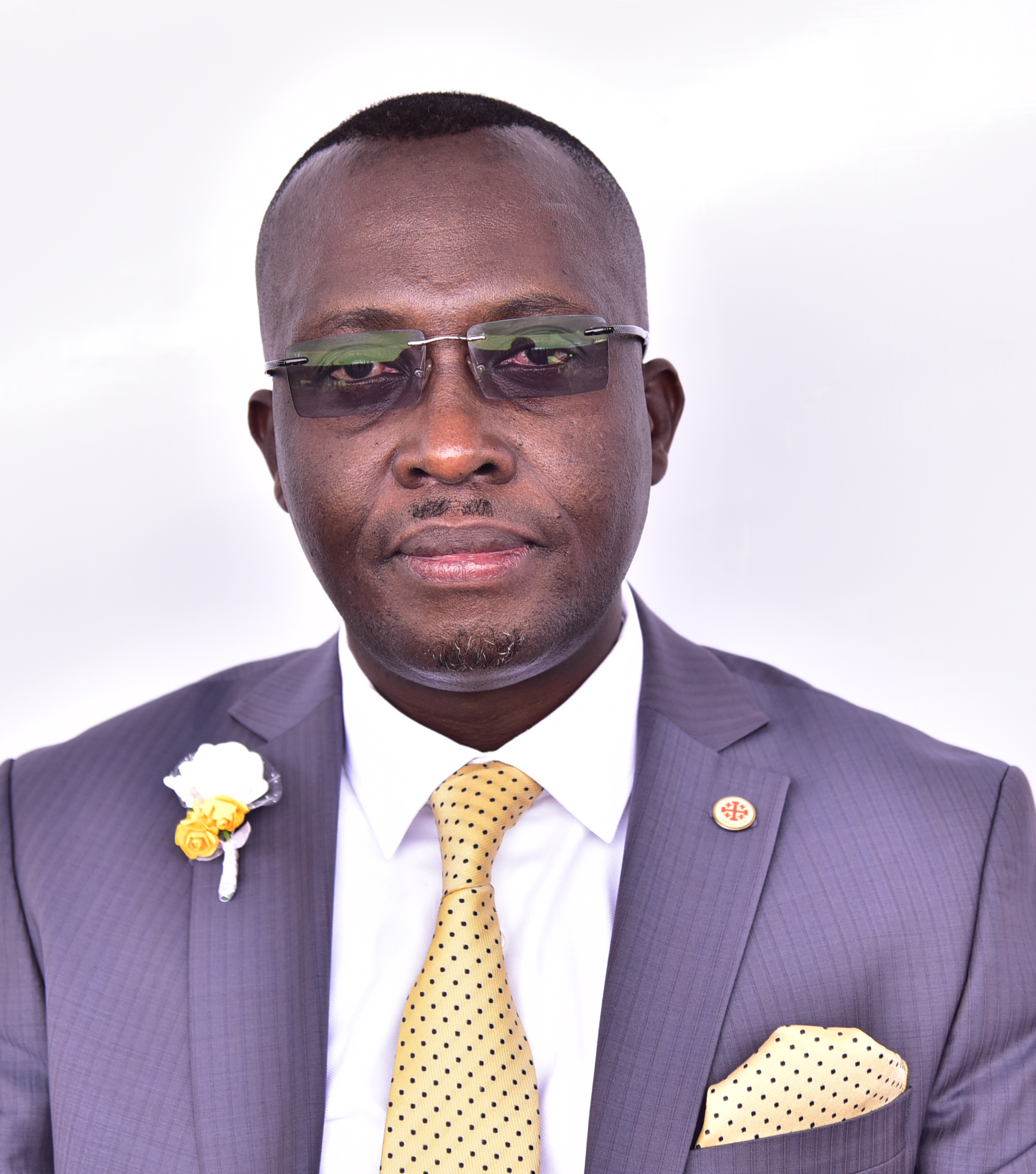
- Mulimba John

Member of Parliament of Uganda from Samia Bugwe
- Incumbent
- Assumed office 2021
- Preceded by: Gideon Onyango

Minister of State for Foreign Affairs (Regional Co-operation)
- Incumbent
- Assumed office 2021

Member of Parliament of Uganda from Samia Bugwe
- In office 2011–2016
- Succeeded by: Gideon Onyango

Personal details
- Party: National Resistance Movement (NRM)

John Mulimba is a Ugandan politician, member of parliament representing Samia Bugwe constituency who currently serves as Minister of State for Foreign Affairs (Regional Co-operation).

== Early life and education ==
He Holds Master’s degree in Business Administration from Makerere University Business School, Bachelor’s degree in Marketing and Sales from the University of Wales, Bachelor’s degree in Social Development from Makerere University, National Higher Diploma in Marketing from Uganda National College of Commerce and a Diploma in Human Resource Management from Makerere University.

He also served on the National Governmental Organization Bureau Board of Directors between 2018 and 2020, Member of the Busitema University Council between 2016-2020 as Chairman of Finance Management Board.

== Political career ==
Mulimba was elected to the Samia Bugwe constituency seat in the parliament in 2011 on the ticket of National Resistance Movement and served until 2016 when he lost his seat to Gideon Onyango. While in the 9th Parliament he was a member on several committees including COSASE and Trade, Cooperatives and Industry. Mulimba was voted out in protest against his opulent lifestyle and negligence of his constituents. He owns Jogo fm radio station in Busia and drives around his constituency in monster pickup. He reclaimed the seat in the 2021 and was appointed Minister of State for Foreign Affairs (Regional Co-operation).

== See also ==
- Taban Sharifah Aate
- Jesca Ababiku
- Abdul Nadduli
- Ibrahim Abiriga
- Dorcus Acen
- Jane Aceng
- Christine Ayo Achen
- Julius Achon
- Nancy Acora
- Rose Christine Adikini
