= Driwaru =

Driwaru is a surname. Notable people with the surname include:

- Jennifer Driwaru (born 1982), Ugandan politician and businesswoman
- Zaitun Driwaru (born 1977), Ugandan politician
