= Huda Abason Oleru =

Ugandan Politician

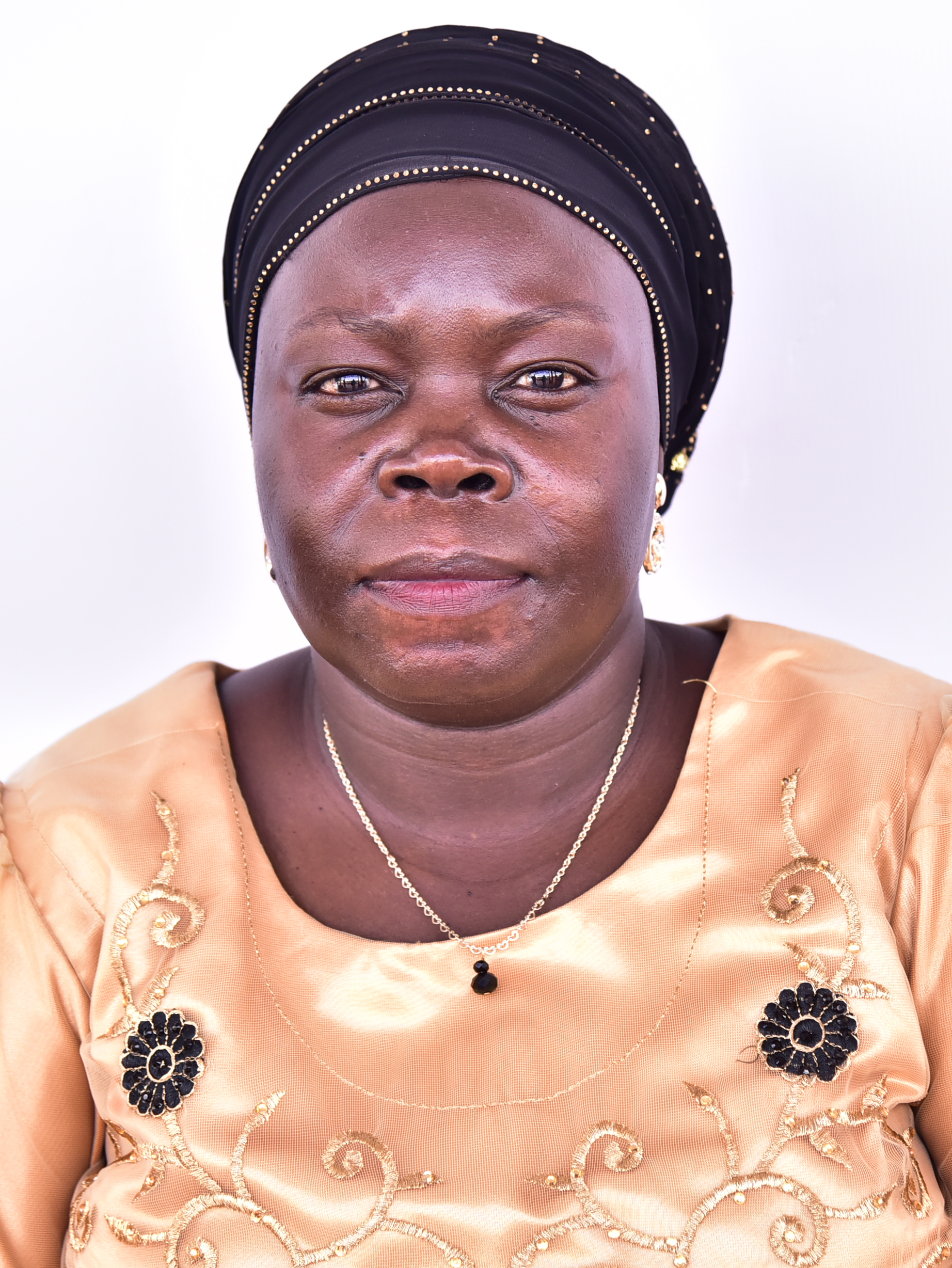
- Born: December 3, 1975 (age 50); Pania Village; Kophi sub-county Yumbe District
- Citizenship: Ugandan
- Education: Limidia Primary School; Yumbe Secondary School; Mvara Secondary School
- Alma mater: Islamic University in Uganda
- Successor: Zaitun Driwaru
- Political party: National Resistance Movement
- Parents: Ayub Adiga (father); Drakai Khadija (mother)

Huda Abason Oleru (born 3 December 1975) is a Ugandan Politician and legislator who was the Women Member of Parliament Representative for Yumbe District in the Eighth and Ninth parliament of Uganda. She was Independent but she is now affiliated to National Resistance Movement political Party. She was also the Minister of State for Veteran Affairs.

== Early life and education ==
Huda was born on 3 December 1975 to Ayub Adiga (father) and Drakai Khadija (mother) of Pania village, Kophi sub-county in Yumbe District. Huda went to Limidia Primary School before joining Yumbe Secondary School. She then Joined Mvara Secondary School. After her secondary education, Huda joined Islamic University in Uganda (IUIU) where she attained her bachelor's degree in public administration. Before joining politics, Huda also attained a master's degree in public administration and management.

== Career ==
Huda worked as a teacher at Aringa Primary School and she was also the secretary for the youth of Romogi sub-county before joining politics. She was also the National Resistance Movement Council Youth general secretary in Romogi Sub-county in 1996. Between 1996 and 1998, she was a teacher at Limitia Primary School. She was the Community Facilitator with Community Actor Programme between 1998 and 2000. Between 2000 and 2003, Huda was the Investment chairperson for Lulu sub-county.

== Personal life ==
Huda is married to Mohammed Abason Ingamule.

== See also ==
- List of members of the eighth Parliament of Uganda
- Yumbe District
- Naima Melsa Gule Avako
- Zaitun Driwaru
