= Rose Atima Ayaka =

Ugandan politician

- Born: 17 September 1975 (age 50); Uganda
- Education: Makerere University (Bachelor of Arts in Social Sciences); Uganda Military Academy; Officer Cadet Course; Eastern and Southern African Management Institute; Certificate in Effective Supervisory Management; Uganda Management Institute; Postgraduate Diploma in Human Resource Management; Master of Management Studies (In progress)
- Occupation: Politician
- Years active: 1999–present

Rose Atima Ayaka (born 17 September 1975) is a Ugandan politician, who served as the elected District Woman Representative for Maracha District, in the 10th Ugandan Parliament (2016 - 2021).

== Early life and education ==
Ayaka was born on 17 September 1975. She attended primary school locally. She attended Mvara Secondary School in the city of Arua, for her O-Level studies, graduating in 1989. She then continued with her A-Level education at Muni Girls' Secondary School, also in Arua, obtaining her High School Diploma from there in 1993.

She was then admitted to Makerere University, Uganda's oldest and largest public university, graduating in 1996 with a Bachelor of Arts degree in Social Sciences. In 1999, she attended an Officer Cadet Course at the Uganda Military Academy, in Kabamba, Mubende District, and was awarded a certificate of attendance.

She also has a Certificate in Effective Supervisory Management, awarded by the Eastern and Southern African Management Institute. Her Postgraduate Diploma in Human Resource Management was obtained from the Uganda Management Institute (UMI) in Kampala, Uganda's capital city. As of 2016, Ayaka was studying to obtain a Master of Management Studies degree, also at UMI.

== Career ==
=== Before politics ===
Ayaka spent over fifteen years before entering politics, working for the Independent Electoral Commission of Uganda. From 1999 until 2000, she worked as the Assistant District Registrar. She then served as the District Registrar from 2000 until 2011. From 2012 until 2015, she was the Regional Election Officer at the Electoral Commission of Uganda.

=== As a politician ===
During the 2016 parliamentary elections, Rose Atima Ayaka defeated two other candidates to win the Maracha District Women's Seat in the 10th Parliament. She ran as a member of the ruling National Resistance Movement political party. In the 10th Parliament, she sat on the parliamentary committee on human rights and the parliamentary committee on health.

== Other considerations ==
She is a member of the Uganda Women Parliamentary Association (UWOPA). She is interested in promoting education, public health and economic empowerment in her community.

== See also ==
- Zaitun Driwaru
- Peace Proscovia
