= Abdul Nadduli =

Ugandan politician and former cabinet minister

Minister without Portfolio
- In office 6 June 2016 – 14 December 2019
- President: Yoweri Museveni

Chairperson, Luwero District Local Government (LC V)
- In office 1996–2006

Chairperson, Luwero District Local Government (LC V)
- In office March 2011 – 2016

Personal details
- Born: 22 December 1942 Kaddunda village, Kapeeka sub-county, Nakaseke District, Uganda
- Party: National Resistance Movement (NRM)
- Education: Bugema University (BA, Social Work and Social Administration)
- Occupation: Politician

Al hajji Abdul Nadduli (born 22 December 1942) is a Ugandan politician and retired military officer. He served as Minister without Portfolio in the Cabinet of Uganda from 6 June 2016 to 14 December 2019. After being dropped from Cabinet in December 2019, he was appointed a Senior Presidential Advisor.

== Early life and education ==
Nadduli was born on 22 December 1942 in Kaddunda village, Kapeeka sub-county, in present-day Nakaseke District, to Nabukenya and Ali Nadduli. Uganda Radio Network reports that he attended Luwero Boys Primary School and Lukalu Quran School, and later studied at Gulu Central Technical School and Ndejje Teachers College.

In 2006, Uganda Radio Network reported that he graduated from Bugema University with a Bachelor of Arts degree in Social Work and Social Administration.

== Career ==
Uganda Radio Network reports that Nadduli worked as a teacher at Kalasa Church of Uganda Primary School in Luwero District for 11 years, before joining the National Resistance Army (NRA) rebel movement in 1980 after a meeting with Yoweri Museveni in Luwero District.

== Political career ==
=== Luwero District chairperson ===
Nadduli served multiple terms as chairperson of the Luwero District Local Government (LC V). The ACODE score-card report for the 2011/2012 financial year states that he was serving his third term and that he had earlier served as district chairperson in the periods 1996 to 2001 and 2001 to 2006; the same report states that he was re-elected in March 2011 after having previously lost the seat in 2006.

In the 2011 district chairperson election, New Vision reported that he won with 40,780 votes against incumbent Ronald Ndawula, who received 32,354 votes, in a three-candidate race.

In 2015, Uganda Radio Network reported that Ronald Ndawula won the Luwero District NRM chairperson seat in internal party elections, succeeding Nadduli as outgoing district party chairperson.

=== Cabinet and advisory roles ===
On 6 June 2016, President Yoweri Museveni appointed Nadduli Minister without Portfolio in the Cabinet of Uganda.

On 14 December 2019, he was dropped from Cabinet and appointed a Senior Presidential Advisor, according to Uganda Radio Network coverage of the reshuffle. New Vision also reported that he was appointed a presidential adviser after the reshuffle.

== Party roles ==
New Vision described Nadduli in 2016 as the National Resistance Movement's national vice chairperson for Buganda. Daily Monitor reported in 2022 that he previously served on the NRM Central Executive Committee (CEC) representing the central region.

== See also ==
- Cabinet of Uganda
- National Resistance Movement
- Daniel Kidega
- Yabezi Kiiza
