= David Vogelsanger =

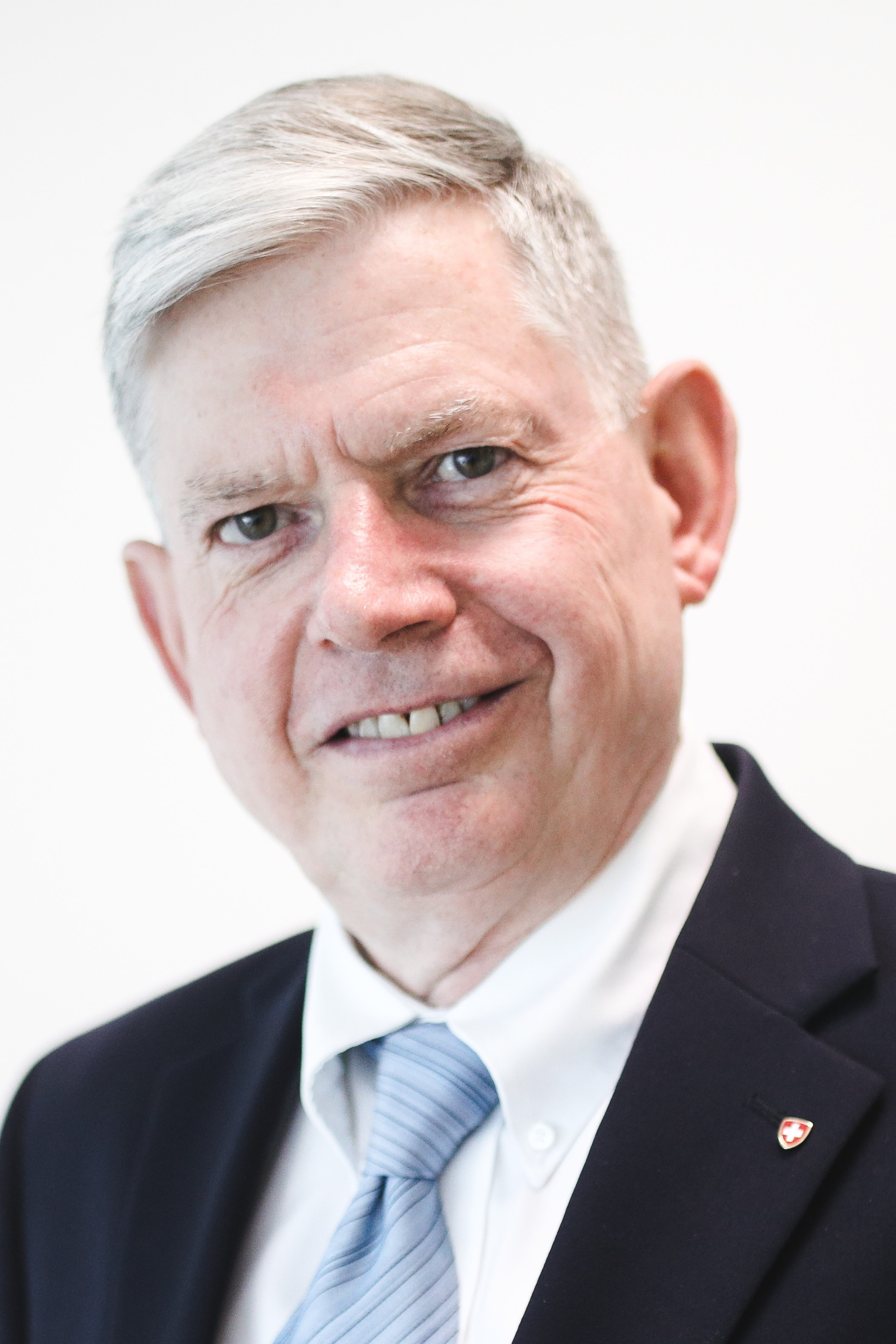
- Ambassador David Vogelsanger

Swiss Ambassador to New Zealand, Fiji, Samoa, Tonga, Tuvalu, and the Cook Islands
- In office 2014–2019

Personal details
- Born: September 16, 1954 (age 72) Switzerland
- Party: Swiss People's Party
- Spouse: Laura Vogelsanger
- Education: University of Zurich (PhD)
- Profession: Diplomat, historian

Military service
- Allegiance: Swiss Armed Forces
- Years of service: until 2014
- Rank: Major
- Unit: Mountain infantry, military intelligence, legal branch

David Vogelsanger (born 16 September 1954) is a Swiss former diplomat who served in his most recent posting from 2014 to 2019 as the Ambassador of Switzerland to New Zealand, Fiji, Samoa, Tonga, Tuvalu, and the Cook Islands and as Consul General to American Samoa.

== Biography ==
Vogelsanger is the son of Swiss protestant theologian, minister and historian Peter Vogelsanger and of Irmgard Vogelsanger-de Roche. He is married to Laura Vogelsanger. His sister is ethnologist Dr Cornelia Vogelsanger.

He studied history and political science from 1975 to 1979, obtained a doctorate from University of Zurich in 1986 and occasionally publishes essays. He has also served in the Swiss army until 2014, in early years as a machine-gunner in the mountain infantry, later in military intelligence and in the legal branch as a specialist officer major.

In 2018 he unsuccessfully ran, from New Zealand, for mayor of his small hometown Kappel am Albis, receiving a plurality of votes but falling 13 votes short of the necessary absolute majority. He has been a member of the national-conservative Swiss People’s Party since 1997. In the Swiss federal elections on 20 October 2019, he ran as a candidate of that party for the National Council on a list of people over 55 years old and obtained 2022 votes.

== Career ==
Vogelsanger worked from 1980 to 1984 as a delegate of the International Committee of the Red Cross in armed conflict situations in Chad, Cambodia, Uganda, Angola, Lebanon and Iraq. On 24 June 1981, he was the senior Red Cross official present when Uganda National Liberation Army troops massacred 86 civilians in the Ombaci mission compound in Arua, West Nile, Northern Uganda which he had previously declared a neutralized zone. He served in 1984/85, as a humanitarian advisor to the United Nations Peacekeeping Force in Cyprus.

After a short period in the private economy, Vogelsanger joined in early 1987 the Swiss Diplomatic Service. Early assignments were the International Organisations Division of the Federal Department of Foreign Affairs and the Swiss Delegation to the OECD in Paris. From 1993 to 1997, he was the political officer and media spokesman at the Embassy of Switzerland to the United States. During this period, he was closely involved in the controversy regarding Holocaust-era bank accounts and Swiss National Bank gold transactions. Vogelsanger strongly defended the record of his country during that period in numerous discussions with members United States Congress, representatives of American organisations and journalists.

Vogelsanger then served as deputy to the Swiss Ambassador to Bulgaria and Macedonia from 1997, during the later part of the Yugoslav Wars. From 2001, he directed the International Organisations Section in the Federal Department of Foreign Affairs . In March 2004, he was responsible for the organisation of a United Nations conference on Cyprus in the Bürgenstock Resort which adopted the Annan Plan, rejected in a Greek Cypriot referendum a month later.

From 2005, Vogelsanger was Consul General of Switzerland in Milan. In 2010, he was appointed Ambassador to Ivory Coast, Burkina Faso, Guinea, Liberia and Sierra Leone, residing in Abidjan. During the 2010-11 Ivorian crisis, he maintained contacts with both sides throughout the conflict.

Vogelsanger was appointed Ambassador to New Zealand and Pacific Island States by the Swiss Federal Council on 13 November 2013, and presented his credentials to Governor General Sir Jerry Mateparaeat at Government House in Wellington on 30 October 2014. After five years in that function, he retired from the diplomatic service at the end of September 2019 and returned to Switzerland.
