= Ibrahim Abiriga =

Ugandan politician and military officer (1956–2018)

Member of Parliament for Arua Municipality
- In office 2016 – 8 June 2018
- Succeeded by: Kassiano Wadri

Personal details
- Born: Abiriga Ibrahim Yusuf Abdulla; 1956 Uganda
- Died: June 8, 2018 (aged 62) Kawanda, Wakiso District, Uganda
- Resting place: Arua District, Uganda
- Party: National Resistance Movement
- Occupation: Politician, military officer

Ibrahim Abiriga (1956 – 8 June 2018), also known as Abiriga Ibrahim Yusuf Abdulla, was a Ugandan politician and military officer.

Abiriga served as the Member of Parliament (MP) for Arua Municipality in Uganda’s 10th Parliament from 2016 until death in 2018. Uganda Radio Network reported Parliament’s website listed Abiriga’s birth date as 6 May 1956. Abiriga gained national attention for public appearances in yellow clothing and accessories linked to support for the National Resistance Movement.

== Early life and education ==
Abiriga sat for Primary Leaving Examinations at Rhino Camp Primary School in 1966 and obtained the Uganda Certificate of Education from Kampala Grammar Secondary School in 1973. The same report stated Abiriga obtained a certificate in public administration (2008) and a certificate in administrative law (2011) from Uganda Christian University, Mukono, plus a certificate in Public Administration and Management from Makerere University (2015).

== Military and public service career ==
Abiriga served in Uganda’s armed forces in different periods, including service under Idi Amin, later involvement with the National Resistance Army, and later service in the Uganda People’s Defence Forces, with the rank of colonel.

Abiriga served as Resident District Commissioner for Arua District for 12 years from 2001, later transferred to Yumbe District in a similar role, then resigned before contesting for Parliament.

== Parliamentary career ==
Abiriga won the Arua Municipality seat in the 2016 general election and served until death in June 2018. Abiriga served on Parliament’s Committee on the Defense and Internal Affairs in the parliament of Uganda.

New Vision and Uganda Radio Network also reported that Abiriga supported the constitutional amendment process linked to removal of the presidential age limit.

== Public image ==
Abiriga was a recognisable public figure known for wearing yellow clothing and using yellow personal items as a public expression of support for the National Resistance Movement. Uganda Radio Network also described Abiriga as an National Resistance Movement enthusiast known for trademark yellow attire and a yellow vehicle.

== Death and tributes ==
On 8 June 2018, Abiriga was shot dead alongside his body guard near a home in Kawanda, Wakiso District, according to New Vision and Uganda Radio Network reports.

Uganda Radio Network reported Parliament held a special sitting on 10 June 2018 to pay tribute, with speeches across parties. Prayers for the body took place at Gadaffi Mosque in Kampala before the body was taken to Parliament for MPs to pay last respects. Parliament of Uganda published a gallery from the tribute sitting. Burial arrangements placed burial at Rhino Camp in Arua District.

During Abiriga’s burial, President Yoweri Museveni pledged to look after Abiriga’s widow and children, build a classroom block at Rhino Camp Primary School and name it after Abiriga, and fund a clan micro-credit scheme with Shs 50 million as start-up capital (and also mentions exploring renovations to Abiriga’s building at Anyafio).

In June 2025, Abiriga's widow, Amina Abiriga, sought a personal meeting with President Yoweri Museveni, stating that government pledges made after Abiriga's assassination had not been fulfilled and that the family continued to face challenges. The Nile Post reported that, at the time of publication, no official response had been issued regarding her request.

== By-election ==
After Abiriga’s death, a by-election filled the Arua Municipality seat. Independent candidate Kassiano Wadri won with 6,421 votes, ahead of National Resistance Movement candidate Nusura Tiperu with 4,798 votes.

== See also ==
- Arua District
- Parliament of Uganda
- National Resistance Movement
- Kassiano Wadri
- Yumbe District
