= Embassy of Switzerland, Wellington =

Swiss diplomatic mission to New Zealand

Embassy of Switzerland in New Zealand
- Location: Wellington
- Address: Level 12, Maritime Tower; 10 Customhouse Quay; Wellington 6011; New Zealand
- Coordinates: 41°16′56″S 174°46′43″E
- Ambassador: Viktor Vavricka
- Website: Official Website

The Embassy of Switzerland in New Zealand is the official diplomatic mission of Switzerland in New Zealand and in a number of Pacific island countries.

The Chancery is located in the Maritime Tower, a modern seventeen story office building overlooking the Wellington Harbour. The building was completed in 2006. Until 2009 the location had been on Panama Street. The Residence is a historical building in Woburn, Lower Hutt, 15 kilometers from the Wellington city center.

== Tasks of the embassy ==
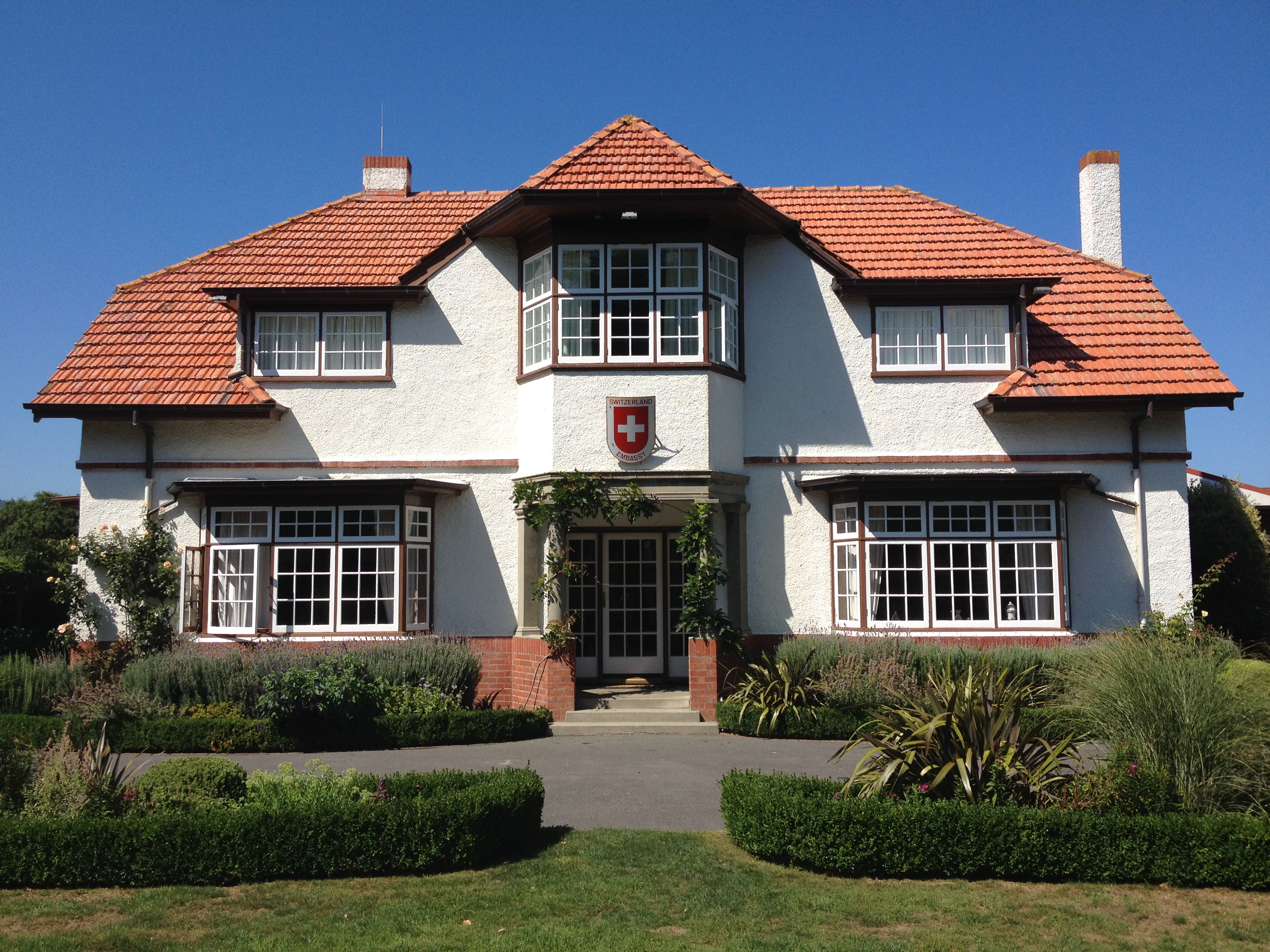
Residence of the Ambassador of Switzerland in Wellington

The embassy is responsible for diplomatic relations between Switzerland, New Zealand, Fiji, Samoa, Tonga, Tuvalu and the Cook Islands. It represents Swiss political, consular, economic, financial, legal, scientific and cultural interests. The embassy is also consular representation for Niue and American Samoa, the Ambassador serving as Consul General in this United States territory.

Around 7,000 Swiss citizens live in New Zealand and the embassy offers the whole range of consular services to this population. It is supported in its consular and diplomatic work by subordinate posts led by Honorary Consuls, the Consulate of Switzerland in Auckland, the consulate general in Suva, Fiji, the consulate general in Apia, Samoa, and the consulate general in Nuku'alofa, Tonga.

== History ==
The first representation of Switzerland in New Zealand was a Consulate established in 1912, initially located in Auckland but relocated to Wellington in 1937. Walter Schmid was from 1937 the first career consular officer heading the post. In 1955, the representation was upgraded to a Consulate General and diplomat Pierre Aubaret became the first Consul General. After having established diplomatic relations with New Zealand in 1962, the representation became an Embassy. Jean-Pierre Weber was its first Chargé d'affaires from 1963. In 1966, the Consulate in Auckland was reopened with an honorary consul in charge. Max Corti was the first Swiss resident Ambassador to New Zealand from 1969.

In 2007 (Samoa), 2012 (Fiji) and 2017 (Tonga) Switzerland extended its representative network in the region by opening Consulates General with an honorary consul general heading the post.

After the establishment of diplomatic relations with New Zealand, Switzerland took this step in 1985 with the Kingdom of Tonga, in 1987 with Western Samoa, today Samoa, in 1989 with the Republic of Fiji, in 2005 with Tuvalu and in 2010 with the Cook Islands, a self governing territory in free association with New Zealand.

== Swiss representatives ==
The current Ambassador of Switzerland in Wellington is Michael Winzap. He also serves as Consul General of Switzerland to American Samoa, a United States Territory.

The following Swiss representatives have served in New Zealand, Fiji, Samoa and Tonga.

=== Representatives in Wellington ===
Name	Term	Rank
Walter Schmid	1937–1946	Consul
Ernst Theiler	1946–1949	Consul
Henri Blanchard	1949–1955	Consul
Pierre Aubaret	1955–1959	Consul General
Oscar Rossetti	1959–1963	Consul General
Jean-Pierre Weber	1963–1967	Chargé d'affaires
Paul Erb	1967–1969	Chargé d'affaires
Max Corti	1969–1974	Ambassador
Fritz Adams	1975–1979	Chargé d'affaires
Walter Sollberger	1979–1982	Chargé d'affaires
Ivan Etienne	1982–1987	Chargé d'affaires
Fridolin Wyss	1987–1989	Chargé d'affaires
Michael von Schenk	1989–1993	Ambassador
Ernst Thurnheer	1993–1996	Ambassador
Walter Simmen	1996–2000	Chargé d'affaires
Sylvie Matteucci	2000–2005	Ambassador
Beat Nobs	2005–2010	Ambassador
Marion Weichelt	2010–2014	Ambassador
David Vogelsanger	2014–2019	Ambassador
Michael Winzap	2019–2022	Ambassador
Viktor Vavricka	2022–	Ambassador

(Source: website of the Swiss Confederation)

=== Representatives in Auckland ===
Name	Term	Rank
Georg Streiff	1912–1917	Honorary Consul
Walter John Pugh	1917–1918	Honorary Consul
John Andrew Charles Allum	1926–1933	Consular Agent
Albert Blau	1933–1936	Consular Agent
Ernest Merz	1966–1970	Consular Agent
Arthur Müller	1970–1994	Honorary Consul
Peter Deutschle	1994–2018	Honorary Consul
Adrian Blaser	2019–	Honorary Consul

(Source: website of the Swiss Confederation)

Of particular historical interest is Sir John Allum CBE who served as Mayor of Auckland from 1941 to 1952 and is remembered as father of the famous Auckland Harbour Bridge.

=== Representatives in Suva, Fiji ===
Name	Term	Rank
Rolf Gfeller	2012–	Honorary Consul General

(Source: website of the Swiss Confederation)

=== Representatives in Apia, Samoa ===
Name	Term	Rank
Marco Kappenberger	2007–2012	Honorary Consul General
Sylvie Salanoa	2013–	Honorary Consul General

(Source: website of the Swiss Confederation)

=== Representatives in Nuku'alofa, Kingdom of Tonga ===
Name	Term	Rank
Carl Henry Sanft	2017–	Honorary Consul General

(Source: website of the Swiss Confederation)

== See also ==
- Foreign relations of Switzerland
- List of diplomatic missions of Switzerland
- List of diplomatic missions in New Zealand
- List of ambassadors and high commissioners to and from New Zealand
