= National Cleaning Day (Uganda) =

National Cleaning Day is a monthly sanitation exercise in Uganda held on the last Saturday of each month. The Cabinet approved the initiative on 11 August 2025, and it was formalised in Cabinet Circular No. 1 of 2026, issued on 30 June 2026.. The first National Cleaning Day was held on 25 July 2026.

== Background ==
The government subsequently designated the last Saturday of each month for the exercise, with cleaning activities scheduled from 7:00 a.m. to 10:00 a.m.

The government stated that the initiative was intended to address sanitation and waste-management problems and to encourage participation in maintaining public and private spaces.The Ministry of Health described the programme as part of efforts to improve sanitation, prevent disease outbreaks and promote environmental conservation.

Prime Minister Robinah Nabbanja announced the initiative publicly on 23 July 2026. The government said residents would participate in organised cleaning activities in their communities, including cleaning homes, markets, schools, health facilities, places of worship, roads, drainage channels and other public spaces.

== Implementation ==
The inaugural National Cleaning Day took place on 25 July 2026.The national launch was held at Kiti Zone in Kisenyi III Parish in Kampala Central Division, where Vice President Jessica Alupo presided over the launch on behalf of President Yoweri Museveni.

The National Environment Management Authority (NEMA) participated in the launch of the National Cleaning Days, supporting the initiative as part of efforts to promote environmental sanitation, proper waste management and public participation in maintaining clean communities.

The government restricted movement during the three-hour exercise. Police announced that motor vehicles, motorcycles, bicycles and vessels would not be permitted to use public roads and water bodies during the designated period, subject to exemptions for specified essential services.

The restrictions were accompanied by the closure of businesses during the cleaning period. The government described participation as mandatory rather than voluntary.

Ahead of the second exercise, scheduled for 29 August 2026, police clarified additional exemptions. These included patients and people attending scheduled medical appointments, medical workers, emergency services, security personnel, journalists, foreign tourists, people travelling to airports and vehicles undertaking designated cross-border journeys.

In Kampala, the Kampala Capital City Authority announced measures to increase waste-collection capacity ahead of the second exercise. The authority said it had engaged nine private waste collectors to supplement existing collection services.

== Reception ==
The introduction of mandatory participation and movement restrictions generated criticism and debate. Governance and policy experts interviewed by Uganda Radio Network criticised aspects of the implementation, citing disruption to businesses, transport and public movement while also acknowledging potential benefits for sanitation and tourism.

The inaugural exercise resulted in disruption to businesses and travel. Uganda Radio Network reported that tourists were stranded, buses were rescheduled and banks opened later than usual during the first exercise.

The inaugural exercise also exposed difficulties in waste collection and disposal. Uganda Radio Network reported that several local governments were overwhelmed by the volume of waste collected, with garbage remaining in roadside heaps in some urban areas because of limited transportation and disposal capacity.
