= St. Joseph's College, Ombaci =

Boys secondary school in Uganda

St. Joseph's College Ombaci

Location
- Ombaci, Arua City; Uganda
- Coordinates: 03°03′44″N 30°56′11″E

Information
- Type: Public high school (13–19)
- Motto: “Primus Inter Pares” (“First Among Equals”)
- Religious affiliation: Catholic Church
- Established: January 1, 1943; 83 years ago
- Founder: Fr. Pietro Simoncelli
- Headmaster: Charles Ondoga
- Faculty: 61 (2025)
- Enrollment: 900 (2025)
- Colours: navy blue and white
- Athletics: Rugby, football, track, tennis, volleyball, basketball
- Nickname: ombacian
- Publication: The Ombacian
- Website: www.ombaci.ac.ug

St. Joseph's College Ombaci is a leading boys-only boarding high school located in Arua City in the Northern Region of Uganda.

== Location ==
The college is located in Ombaci, Ombaci Ward, Ayivu Division, Arua City, in the West Nile sub-region, in northwestern Uganda. The school campus is approximately 6 kilometres (4 mi), by road, northeast of the central business district of Arua, the largest city in the sub-region. The geographical coordinates of the college are: 3°03'44.0"N, 30°56'11.0"E (Latitude:3.062222; Longitude:30.936389).

== History ==
The college was founded in 1943 by the Comboni Missionaries, as a technical school, by Fr. Pietro Simoncelli to skill returnees from World War II in technical vocations such as automotive mechanics, brick laying, masonry, carpentry and the like. In 1960, Ombaci College was converted into a secondary school. During the 1970s and 1980s, Ombaci rose to become one of the top five secondary schools in Uganda, under the leadership of its first Headmaster, Father Marco Lino Mich, then later under Hercules Abiriga. The school is also a place of spiritual significance since Fr. Sartori a Catholic priest who is on the path to sainthood passed on in the college Chapel during Easter Friday. Fr. Sartori was a virtuous person having several miracles associated with him. He was buried in the nearby parish cemetery of Holy Cross Ombaci.

The Ugandan civil wars, from 1979 until 1981 and from 1981 until 1986 adversely affected academic standards at Ombaci. Despite the challenges, the Headmasters Augustine Juruga, Andresile Adrian and John Adrionzi posted impressive academic results. The period of the early 2010s saw a drop in performance. Credit is given to Andrew Tumwesige, who was headmaster from 2012 until 2018, for turning the school around. The current headmaster Charles Ondoga has continued on the positive trajectory of progress. Under him the schools academic standards have already reached the past peaks of 1980s when the school competed nationally. Renovation of key infrastructure has continued. The school is also implementing the second strategic plan of 2025-2029 with bold plans.

List of Headmasters:

1. Fr. Pietro Simoncelli MCCJ (1943-1957) Born 17/6/1891 Died 26/7/1964
2. Fr. Luiji Ponzoni MCCJ (1957-1966) Born 28/7/1913 Died 7/9/1987
3. Fr. Lino Mich Marco MCCJ (1966-1983)
4. Mr. Abiriga Hercules (1983-1994)
5. Mr. Andresile Adrian (1994-1996; 1997-1998)
6. Mr. Andrionzi John (1996-1997)
7. Mr. Juruga Augustine (1998-2010)
8. Mr. Akuma Santos (2010-2012)
9. Mr. Tumwesige Andrew (2012-2018)
10. Mr. Ondoga Charles (2018- todate)

== Prominent alumni ==
- Dr. Worodria William consultant Physician Mulago nation referral hospital
- Hon. Feta Geofrey, Member of Parliament for Ayivu East, Arua City in the 11th Parliament (2021 - 2026)
- Dr. Bhoka Didi George, Member of Parliament Obongi in the 11th Parliament
- Hon. Leku Joel, Member of parliament Terego West in the 11th Parliament
- Richard Idro, consultant pediatric neurologist and President of Uganda Medical Association
- Raphael p'Mony Wokorach, the Arch Bishop of the Roman Catholic Arc Diocese of Gulu
- Fr. Rufino Ezama MCCJ, Provincial Superior of the Comboni Missionaries, North America

== Ombaci Massacre ==
On Wednesday, 24 June 1981, six months into the second reign of Apollo Milton Obote, UNLA soldiers arrived at the Ombaci Catholic Mission and adjoining secondary school. They began to indiscriminately kill civilians, women, children and the elderly; by shooting, bludgeoning, stabbing, lancing, stomping, kicking and exploding ordinance (rocket propelled grenades).

The exact number of people killed is not accurately known. Credible sources have quoted a number as "over 90". Another credible source reports that the secondary school grounds contain a mass grave for 97 victims.

A large number of survivors, estimated at about 400 were still alive in May 2019, living with physical and mental injuries as a result of the assault.

== Challenges ==
The main challenge is that infrastructure built in the 1940s was for 400 students is inadequate for the high demand of 900 students. Efforts have been put to renovate the existing structures since 2012 to date with support from the founding fathers the Comboni Missionaries, Parents and Old Boys Association.

== See also ==
- Ombaci
- Mvara Secondary School
- Education in Uganda
