= Kassiano Wadri =

Ugandan politician

Honorable

Personal details
- Born: Kassiano Wadri; 29 September 1957 (age 69) Arua, Uganda
- Education: Uganda Martyrs University (Associate degree in Democracy and Social Development); Makerere University (Bachelor of Social Work and Social Administration) (Master of Arts in Social Sector Planning and Management)
- Occupation: Social worker and politician
- Known for: Social work, politics

Kassiano Ezati Wadri (born 29 September 1957) is a Ugandan social worker and politician. He was the independent Member of Parliament, representing Arua Municipality in the 10th Parliament (2016 to 2021), effective 29 August 2018. The seat fell vacant when Ibrahim Abiriga of the National Resistance Movement (NRM), was assassinated in June 2018.

Wadri previously represented Terego County, Arua District in the 7th Parliament (2001–2006), 8th Parliament (2006–2011) and 9th Parliament (2011–2016), as a member of the opposition Forum for Democratic Change (FDC) political party. During those tours of duty, Wadri served as the opposition chief whip, the chairperson of the Committee on Government Assurances and as a member of the Committee on Agriculture, Animal Industry and Fisheries and of the Business Committee.

== Background and education ==
He was born in Aivu sub-county, in Arua District on 29 September 1957. He graduated from Makerere University, Uganda's oldest and largest public university, with a Bachelor of Social Work and Social Administration degree in 1981. Twenty years later, the same university awarded him a Master of Arts in Social Sector Planning and Management. In 2003, he graduated with an Associate degree in Democracy and Social Development, from Uganda Martyrs University, in Nkozi, Mpigi District.

== Career ==
Kassiano Wadri was a member of parliament for 20 years, going back to 2001, when he was first elected. For much of that time, he was in a leadership position as the opposition chief whip. He was a member of the main FDC opposition political party during that time.

During the by-election to replace the slain Ibrahim Abiriga in August 2018, Wadri decided to run as an independent. In the run-up to this election, Kassiano Wadri was arrested together with other politicians, including Robert Kyagulanyi Ssentamu and others. They were charged with various political crimes and their cases were still winding through the Uganda judicial system, as of December 2018.

On 15 August 2018, Wadri won the Arua Municipality bye-election, while jailed in Gulu District, with 6,421 votes, against the closest challenger, Nusura Tiperu, of the NRM political party, who received 4,798 votes. He was sworn in on 29 August 2018.

== See also ==
- Arua District
- Forum for Democratic Change
- West Nile sub-region
