= Taban Sharifah Aate =

Ugandan politician

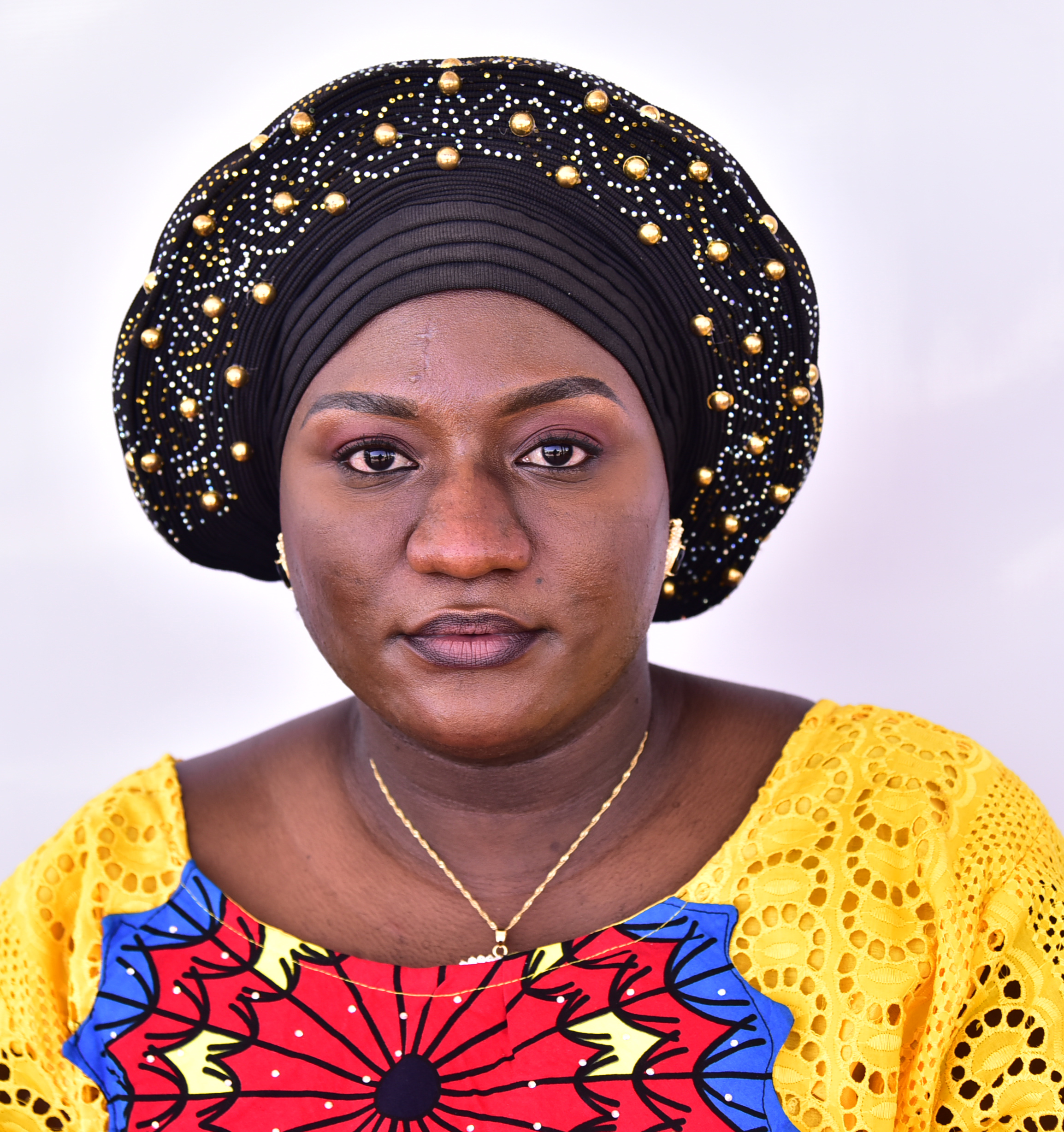
- Occupation: Politician
- Years active: 2017–present
- Title: Member of Parliament for Koboko District
- Term: 2021–present
- Political party: National Resistance Movement

Taban Sharifa Aate is a Ugandan politician and legislator born on May 2, 1992 (age 34). She represents the people of Koboko district as a Woman MP In the 11th parliament of Uganda. She subscribes to the National Resistance Movement party (NRM) a party under the chairmanship of Yoweri Kaguta Museveni, president of the republic of Uganda.

== Early life and education ==
Aate is the grand daughter of former Ugandan president Idi Amin Dada. Her father is Taban Amin, who launched a rebellion against the government after his father was removed from power but was later offered Amnesty by the Museveni government.

Despite the prior bad blood between the families of Amin, and Museveni, Aate was able to study on state house scholarship offered by president Museveni and views him as a father figure.

Aate is now a member of the National Resistance Movement on whose ticket she rode to get to Parliament. She won with 44,616 votes against Ariye Eunice Owinyi's 4,937 votes.

Her brother Taban Idi Amin was a former MP for Kibanda County in Kiryandongo District on the NRM ticket.

== Career ==
In the parliament of Uganda, Aate serves on the committee on Education and sports.

== See Also ==
- Anita Among
- Evelyn Anite
- Francis Ayume
- Kasiano Wadri
