= Zaitun Driwaru =

Ugandan politician

- Born: 10 December 1977 (age 48); Yumbe District
- Citizenship: Uganda
- Education: Mvara Secondary School; High School Diploma; Muni National Teachers College; Diploma in Secondary Education; Islamic University in Uganda; Bachelor of Public Administration
- Occupations: School teacher, politician
- Years active: 1999–present
- Known for: Politics
- Title: Member of Parliament for Yumbe District Women Constituency

Zaitun Driwaru (born 10 December 1977) is a Ugandan school teacher and politician. She served as the District Woman Representative for Yumbe District, in the 10th Ugandan Parliament (2016–2021).

== Early life and education ==
Driwaru was born on 10 December 1977. She attended Arua Hill Primary School, in the city of Arua, the largest urban centre in the West Nile sub-region. She graduated from there in 1991 and enrolled at Mvara Secondary School also in Arua. She obtained both her Uganda Certificate of Education (O-Level) and her Uganda Advanced Certificate of Education (A-Level) from Mvara, in 1995 and 1999, respectively.

She was admitted to Muni National Teachers College, where she was awarded a Diploma in Secondary Education, in 2002. In 2005, she graduated from the Islamic University in Uganda, with a degree of Bachelor of Public Administration.

== Career ==
=== Before politics ===
From 1999 until 2001, was a sales manager at Bata Uganda. She then served as a secondary school teacher at Aringa Secondary School, in the town of Yumbe. She then served as a Community Development Officer for Yumbe District Local Government, from 2006 until 2011.

=== As a politician ===
During the 2016 parliamentary elections, Zaitun Driwaru contested for the seat of District Woman Representative for Yumbe District. She ran as an independent candidate. Driwaru beat Avako Naima Gule, of the ruling National Resistance Movement political party, who was the incumbent MP at that time. Driwaru received 32,504 votes against Naima's 24,394.

In the 10th Parliament, she serves on the committee on education and sports and the committee on government assurances. She is also a member of the Uganda Women Parliamentary Association (UWOPA). Zaitun Driwaru is a full member of the foundation body of the Uganda Muslim Supreme Council (UMSC).

== See also ==
- Nusura Tiperu
- Rose Atima Ayaka
- Peace Proscovia
