= Ombaci =

Place in Uganda

- Location in Uganda
- Coordinates: 03°03′53″N 30°56′17″E
- Country: Uganda
- Region: Northern Uganda
- Sub-region: West Nile sub-region
- District: Arua District
- Elevation: 3,701 ft (1,128 m)

Ombaci, also Ombachi, is a neighborhood in Arua City in the Northern Region of Uganda.

== Location ==
Ombaci is located in Arua City, in the West Nile sub-region, in Northern Uganda. It is located about 6 kilometres (4 mi), by road, north east of the central business district of Arua. The geographical coordinates of Ombaci are:03°03'53.0"N, 30°56'17.0"E (Latitude:3.064722; Longitude:30.938056). Ombaci lies at an average elevation of 1,128 metres (3,701 ft) above sea level.

== Overview ==
Ombaci, in the local Lugbara language, loosely translated, means "enmity exists", a reference to past conflicts in the area. In this neighborhood, as one travels north from Arua, the road forks into two. The left fork, called Kaya Highway continues north-westwards to Koboko, Oraba and Kaya, South Sudan. The right fork, called Rhino Camp Road continues north-eastwards to Wandi and eventually to Rhino Camp.

Some of the most prominent landmarks in the neighborhood, are (a) Ombaci Primary School (b) Ombaci Roman Catholic Church (c) St. Joseph's College, Ombaci (d) Comboni Missionaries Centre Ombaci and (e) St. Andrew Church of Uganda. It is in this location that the Ombaci Massacre occurred, in June 1981.

== Ombaci Massacre ==
In April 1979, Idi Amin Dada was toppled from power by the Tanzania People's Defence Force (TPDF) and the Uganda National Liberation Army (UNLA). Idi Amin was a native son of the West Nile sub-region and many of the soldiers in his army came from this region too. As the victorious UNLA soldiers marched northwards to Arua, civilians, and former Amin soldiers took refugee in the compound of the Catholic mission and St. Joseph's College Ombaci, both of which were surrounded by a common perimeter fence.

On Wednesday, 24 June 1981, six months into the second reign of Apollo Milton Obote, UNLA soldiers arrived at the Ombaci Catholic Mission and adjoining secondary school. They began to indiscriminately kill civilians, women, children and the elderly; by shooting, bludgeoning, stabbing, lancing, stomping, kicking and exploding ordinance (rocket propelled grenades).

The exact number of people killed is not accurately known. Credible sources have quoted a number as "over 80". Another credible source reports that the secondary school grounds contain a mass grave for 97 victims.

A large number of survivors, estimated at about 400 were still alive in May 2019, living with physical and mental injuries as a result of the assault.

== See also ==
- St. Joseph’s College Ombaci
- Ituka Solar Power Station
- Nyapea
