= Rose Christine Adikini =

Ugandan social activist (1926–2022)

Personal details
- Born: Christine Adikini Opoya; 26 July 1926 (age 100) Tororo, Uganda
- Died: 24 January 2022
- Party: NRM
- Spouse: James Opoya Sipanga
- Parents: Noah Bukare (father); Roza Arenji (mother)
- Education: Nagongera Convent Primary School

Rose Christine Adikini, also known as Christine Adikini Opoya (born 26 July 1926), was a Ugandan social activist for people living with disabilities who died on 24 January 2022.

== Early life and education ==
Christine Adikini Opoya was born on 26 July 1926 to Roza Arenji and Noah Bukare of Bendo Clan.

Adikini attended Nagongera Convent Primary School and Nyondo T.T.C. qualifying as a Grade II Primary Teacher at that time. She started teaching in 1943 and she started a Girls’ Section at St. Teresa Primary School Siwa also acted as the first Head Teacher. She retired from the Teaching Service in 1977 after 34 years of Service.

== Career ==
Adikini served as the Lead Councillor of Persons Living with Disabilities in Tororo District, Uganda, where she represented women and girls with disabilities and raised issues related to violence, discrimination, and accessibility and in 2019 she participated in a leadership training organised by National Union of Women with Disabilities of Uganda (NUWODU), supported by the Spotlight Initiative.

In addition, in the 2006 local government elections in Tororo District, Rose Christine Adikini was elected as a district Councillor representing female persons with disabilities (PWDs).

== Personal life ==
Adikini’s husband was the late James Opoya Sipanga.
