= Jennifer Driwaru =

Ugandan Politician

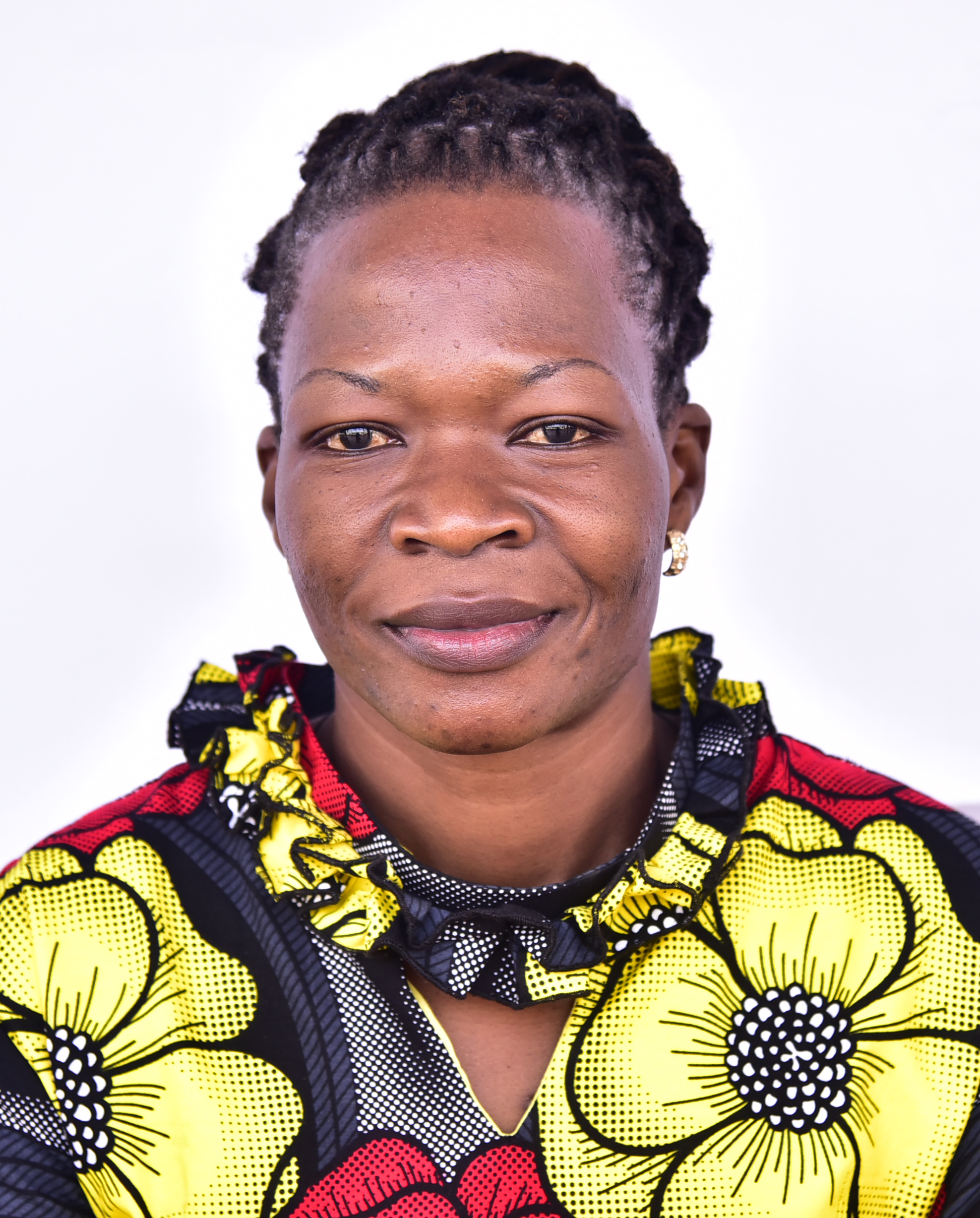
- Born: 1982 (age 43–44); Yivu sub-county, Loinya Parish in Aliro East Village
- Citizenship: Ugandan
- Education: Maracha Primary School, Maracha Secondary School, Kyambogo University
- Occupations: Politician, Counsellor
- Years active: 2016-Date
- Political party: National Resistance Movement (NRM)
- Parents: Orijaba John (father); Florence Drijaru (mother)

Jennifer Driwaru (born in 1982) is a Ugandan politician and businesswoman, a women's representative for Maracha District in the 11th Ugandan Parliament affiliated to National Resistance Movement (NRM).

== Early life and education ==
Driwaru was born and grew up in Yivu sub-county, Loinya Parish in Aliro East Village to Orijaba John, a retired police commander who served as a district police commander (DPC) and Florence Drijaru, a businesswoman.

In 1995, Driwaru completed her Primary Leaving Examinations (PLE) from Maracha Primary School, her O level in 1999 and A level (she did LEG/Fine art) in 2001 from Maracha Secondary School. In 2004, she did a diploma in education with arts and later joined Kyambogo University where she attained her bachelor's degree in Guidance And Counselling in 2012, a postgraduate diploma in Social Work and Social Administration in 2014 to 2015.

== Career ==
She worked as a teacher, teaching English language in Maracha Secondary School then she worked at St. Joseph's Hospital Maracha/ Ovujo Hospital as a social worker between 2022 and 2013. In 2007, Jennifer also worked with Baylor Uganda at Entebbe as a Counsellor with PHAs specialty. She also worked with National Identification Registration Authority (NIRA) as an enrollment officer in 2014 then as a social worker with International Rescue Committee(IRC) between 2017 and 2019.

== Notable works ==
Driwaru bought two ambulances for Maracha district from the money that was said to have been given to her to buy a car.

== See also ==
List of members of the eleventh Parliament of Uganda
