= List of diplomatic missions in New Zealand =

This is a list of diplomatic missions in New Zealand. At present there are 53 embassies/high commissions resident in Wellington, the capital. About ninety other countries accredit their ambassadors from elsewhere.

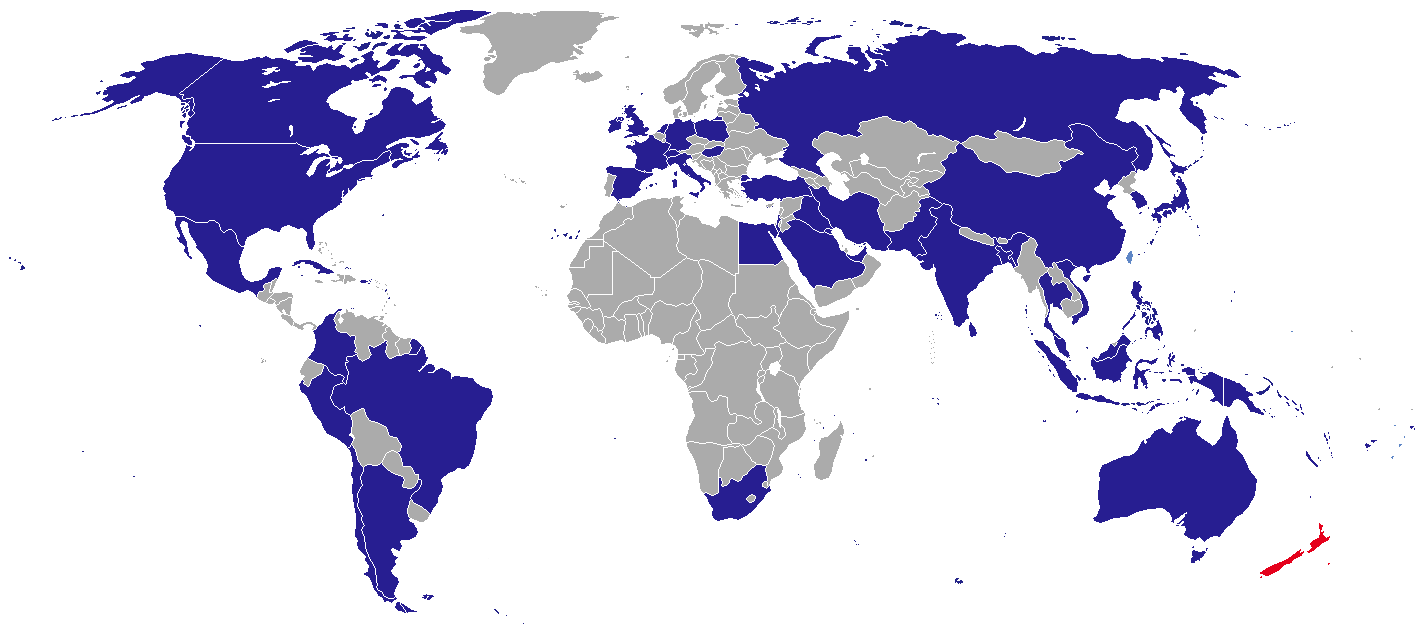
Map of diplomatic missions in New Zealand

== Diplomatic missions in Wellington ==
=== Embassies and High Commissions ===
1. Argentina
2. Australia
3. Bangladesh
4. Brazil
5. Canada
6. Chile
7. China
8. Colombia
9. Cook Islands
10. Cuba
11. Egypt
12. Fiji
13. France
14. Germany
15. Holy See
16. Hungary
17. India
18. Indonesia
19. Iran
20. Iraq
21. Ireland
22. Israel
23. Italy
24. Japan
25. Kuwait
26. Malaysia
27. Mexico
28. Netherlands
29. Niue
30. Pakistan
31. Papua New Guinea
32. Peru
33. Philippines
34. Poland
35. Russia
36. Samoa
37. Saudi Arabia
38. Singapore
39. Solomon Islands
40. South Africa
41. South Korea
42. Spain
43. Sri Lanka
44. Switzerland
45. Thailand
46. Timor-Leste
47. Turkey
48. Tuvalu
49. United Arab Emirates
50. United Kingdom
51. United States
52. Vanuatu
53. Vietnam

=== Other missions or delegations ===
1. European Union (Delegation)
2. Taiwan (Economic & Cultural Office)

=== Gallery ===
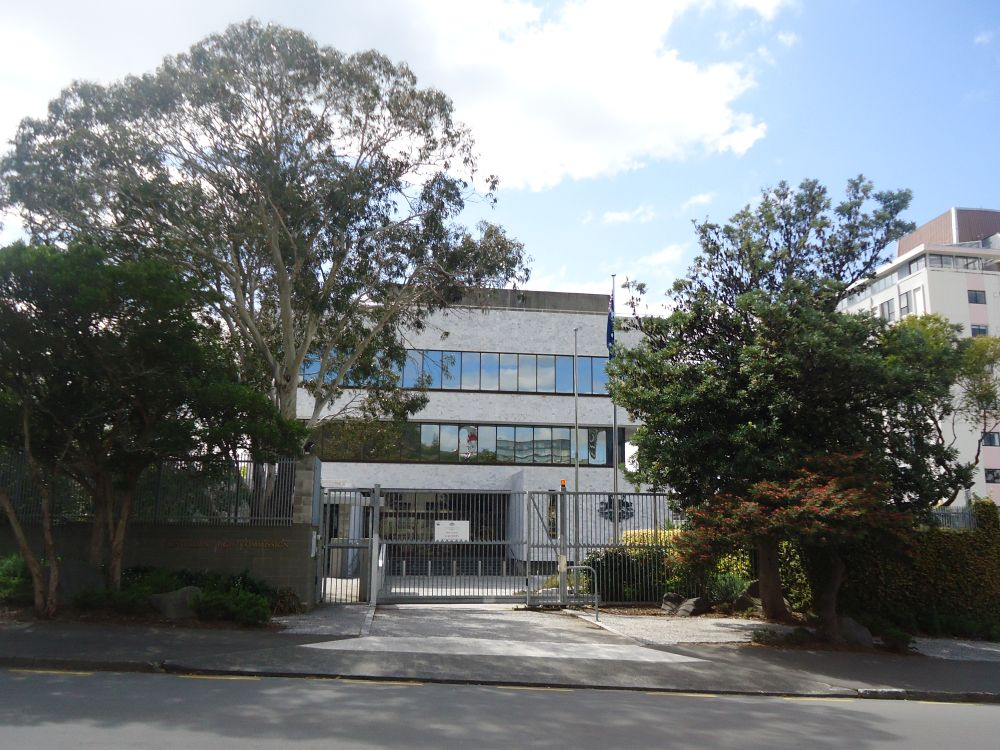
High Commission of Australia

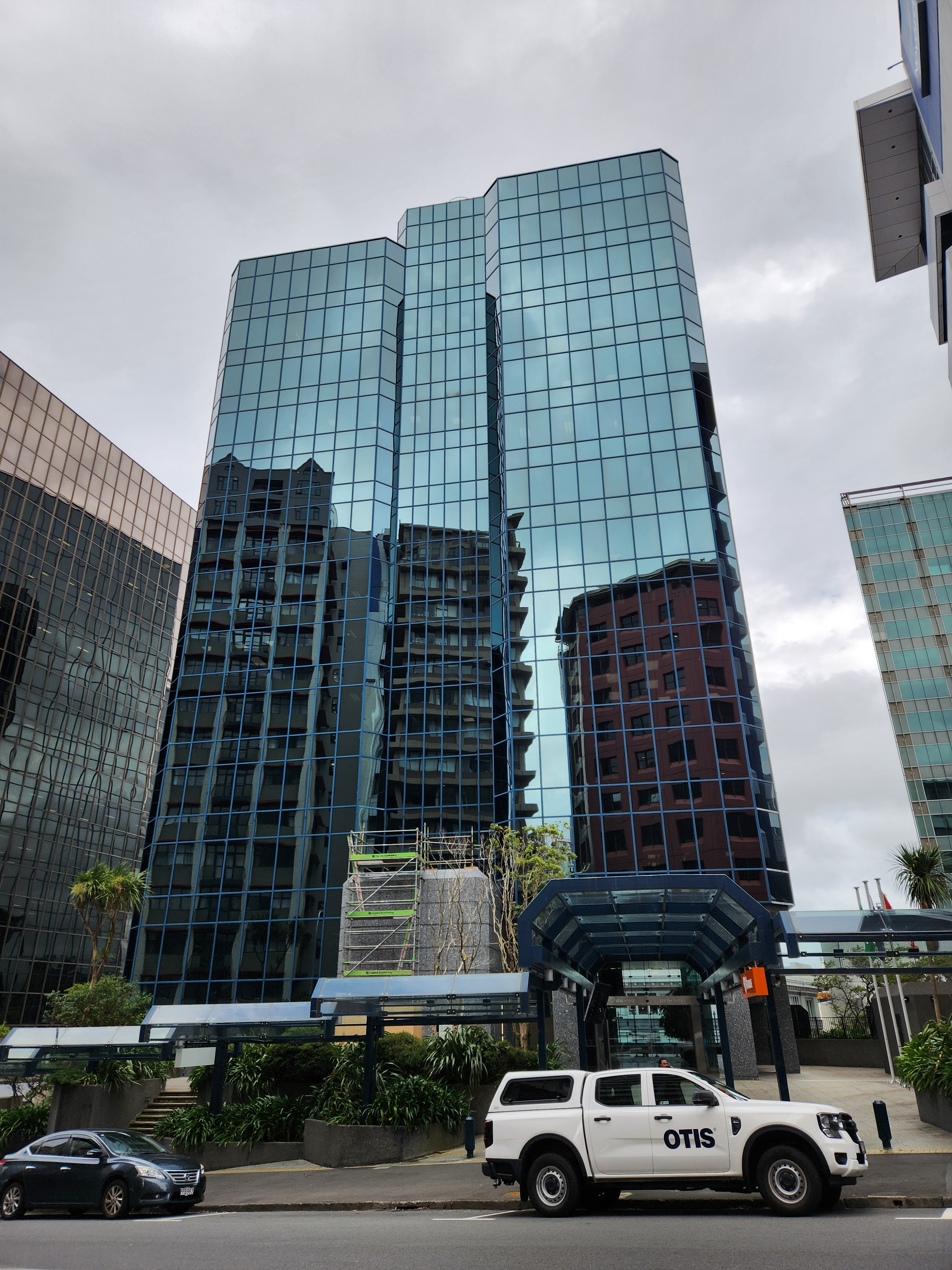
Building hosting the High Commission of Canada

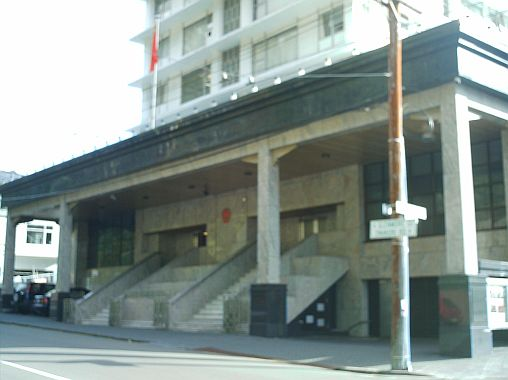
Embassy of China

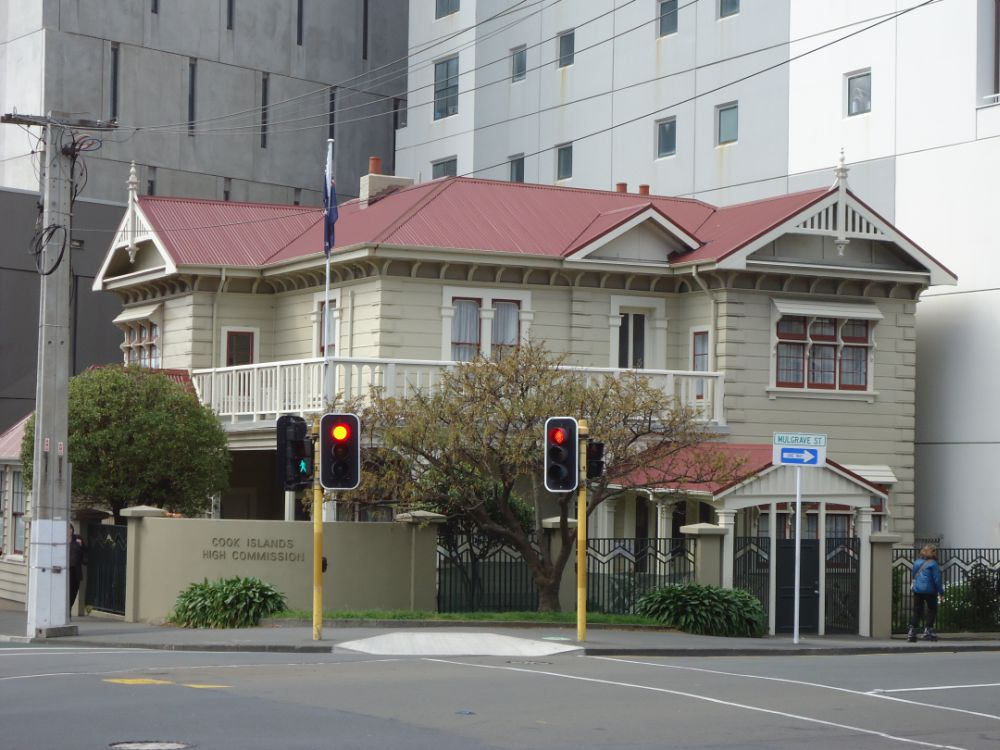
High Commission of the Cook Islands

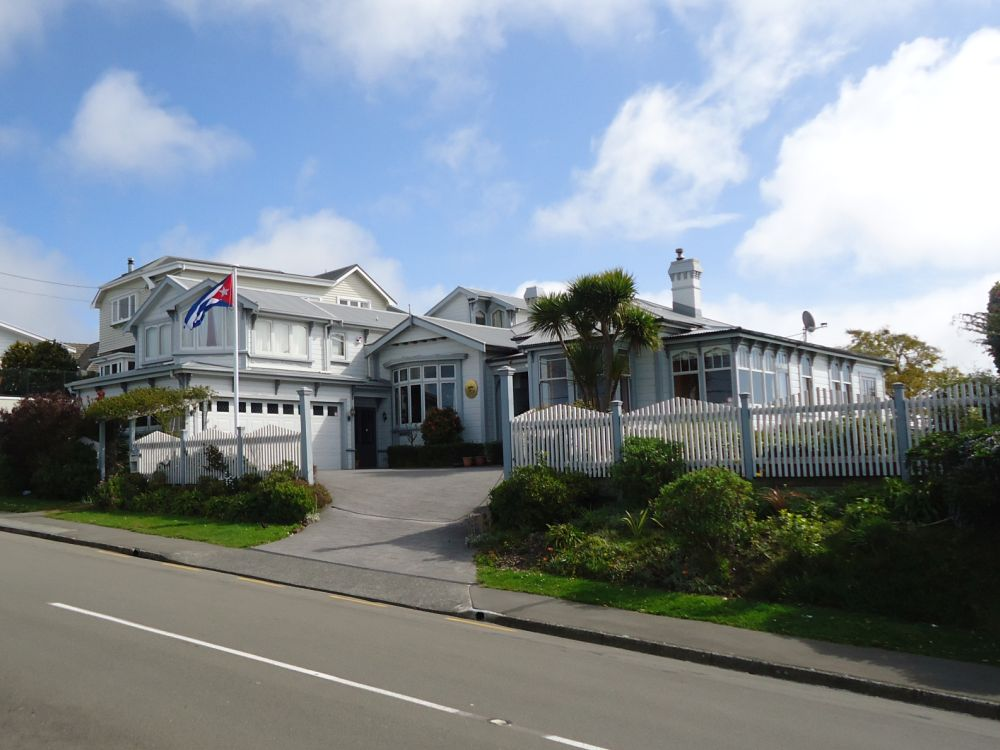
Embassy of Cuba

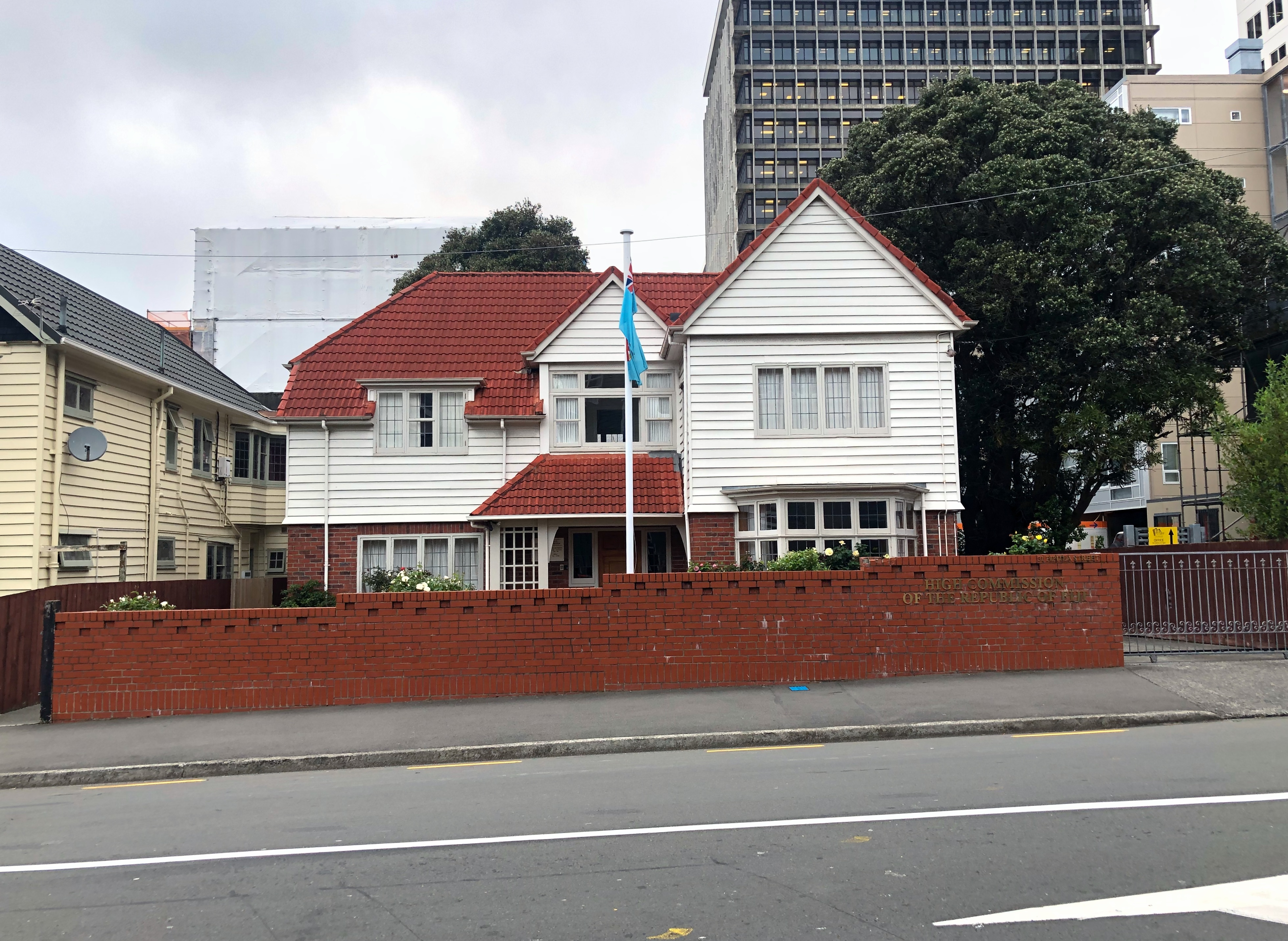
High Commission of Fiji

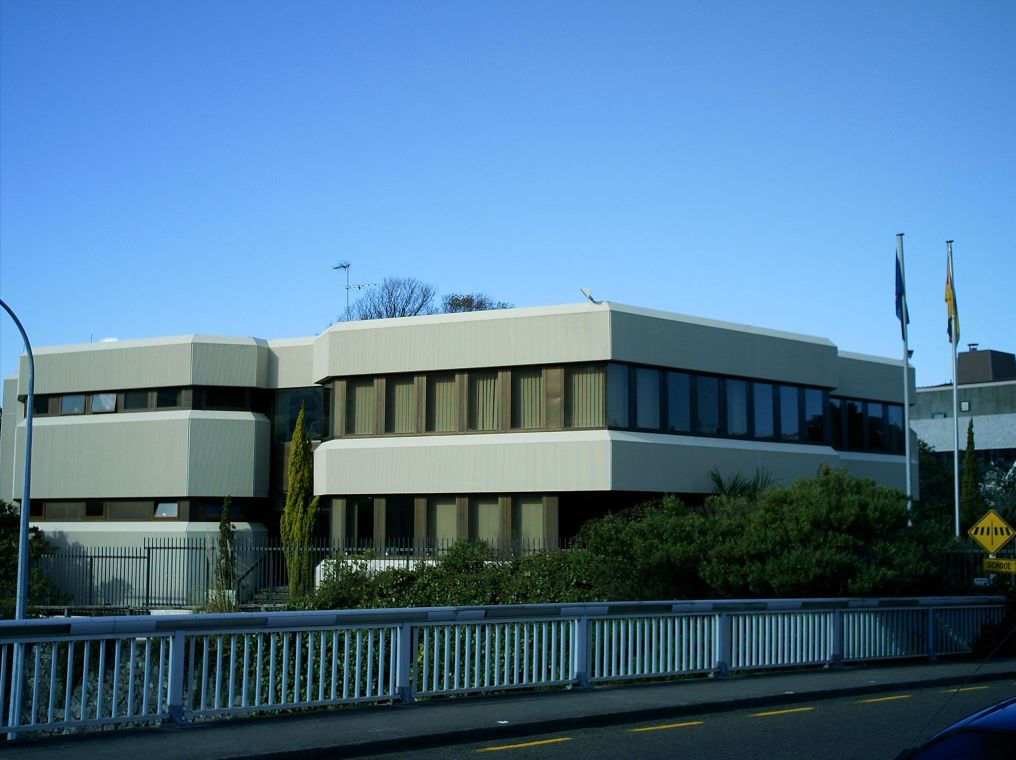
Embassy of Germany

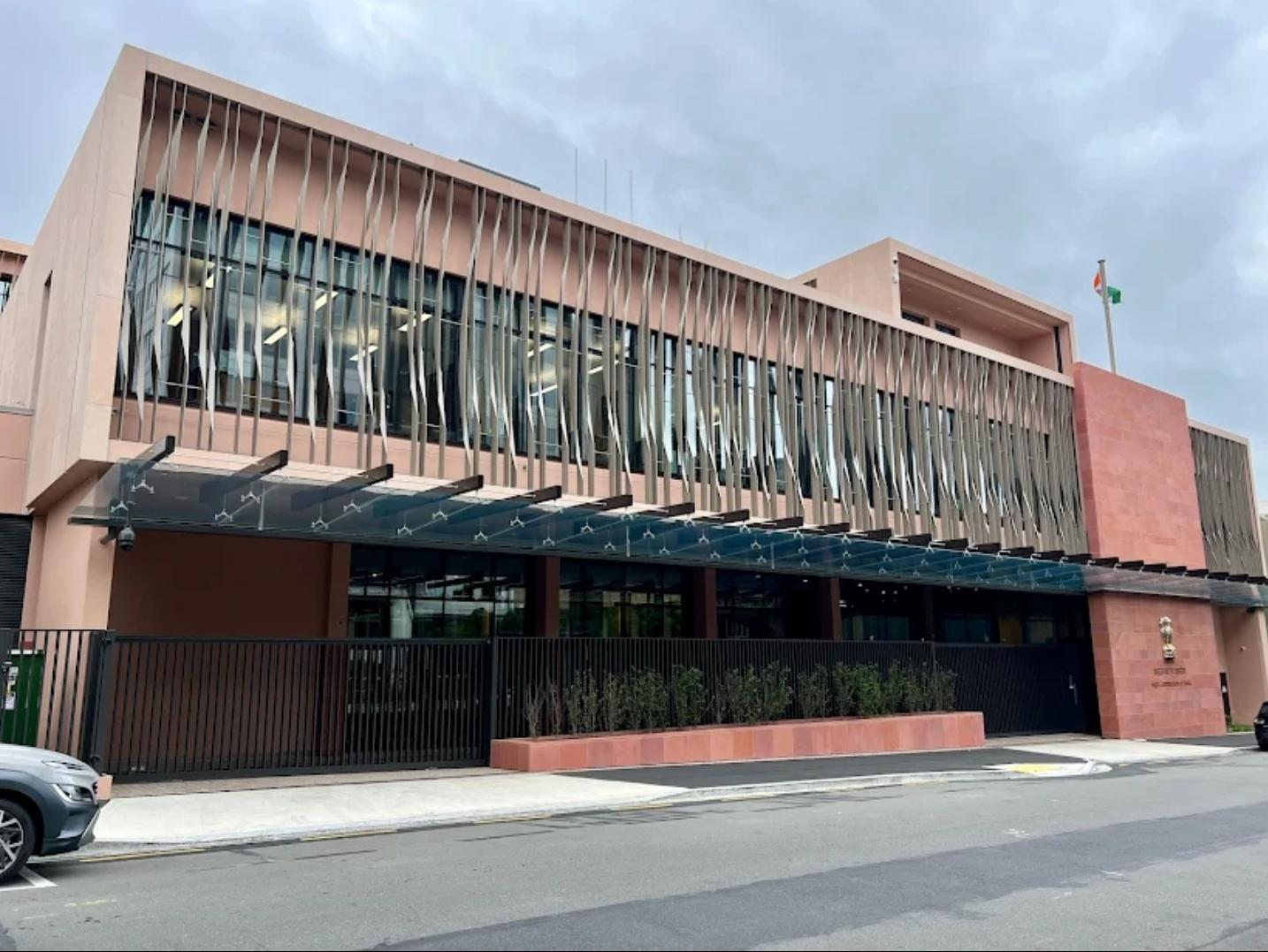
High Commission of India

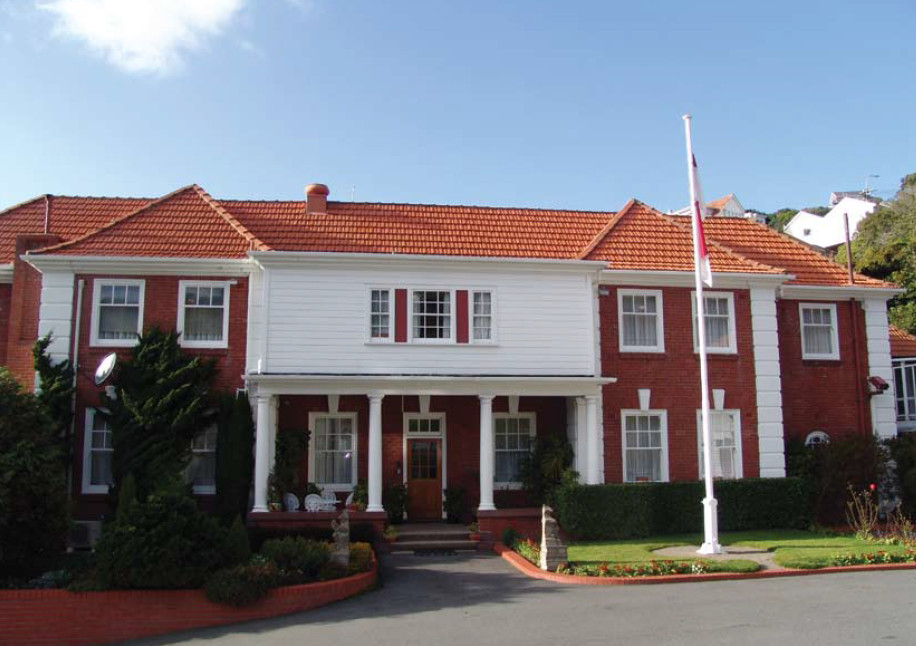
Embassy of Indonesia

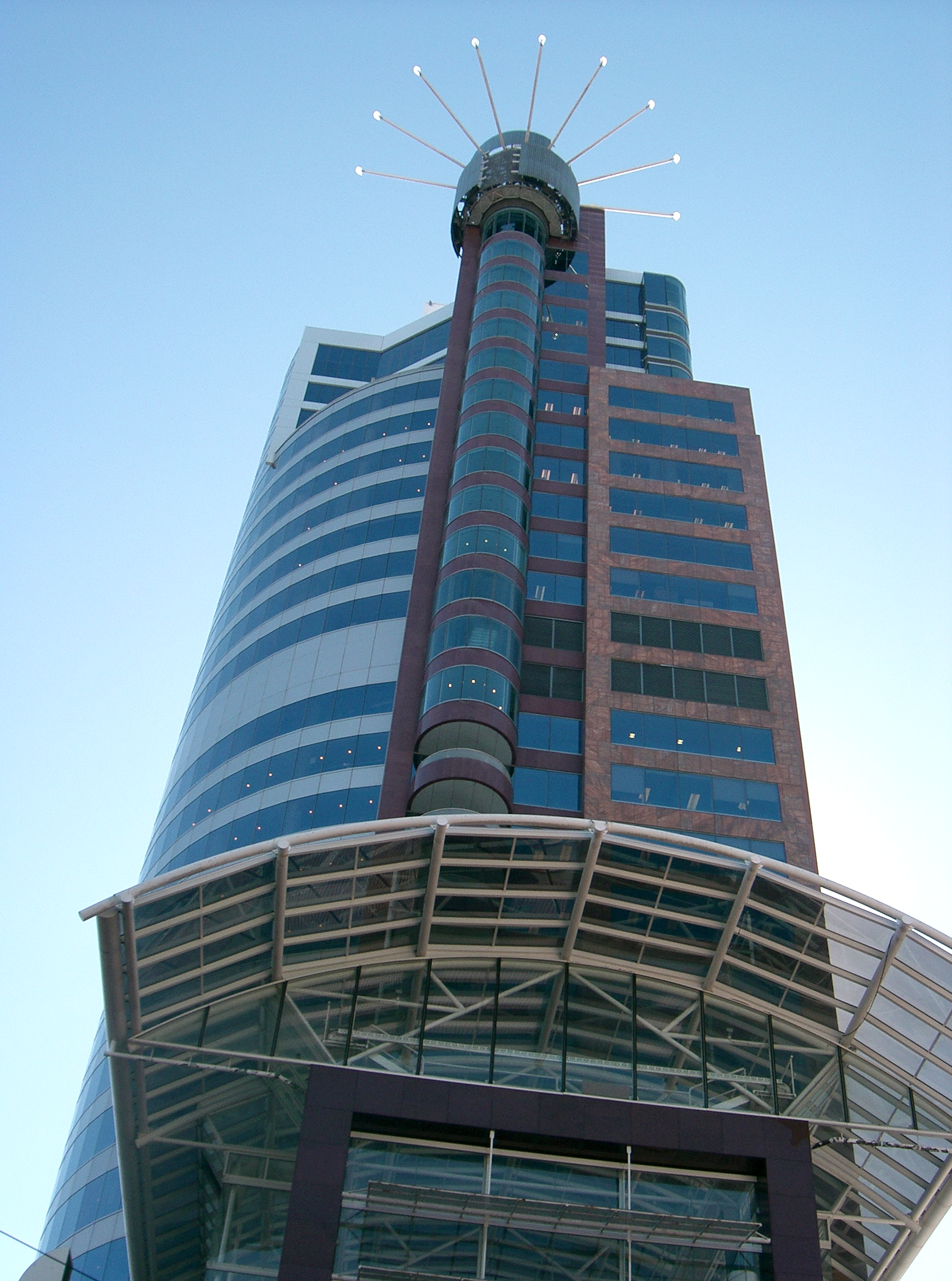
Building hosting the Embassy of Japan and the Taipei Economic & Cultural Office

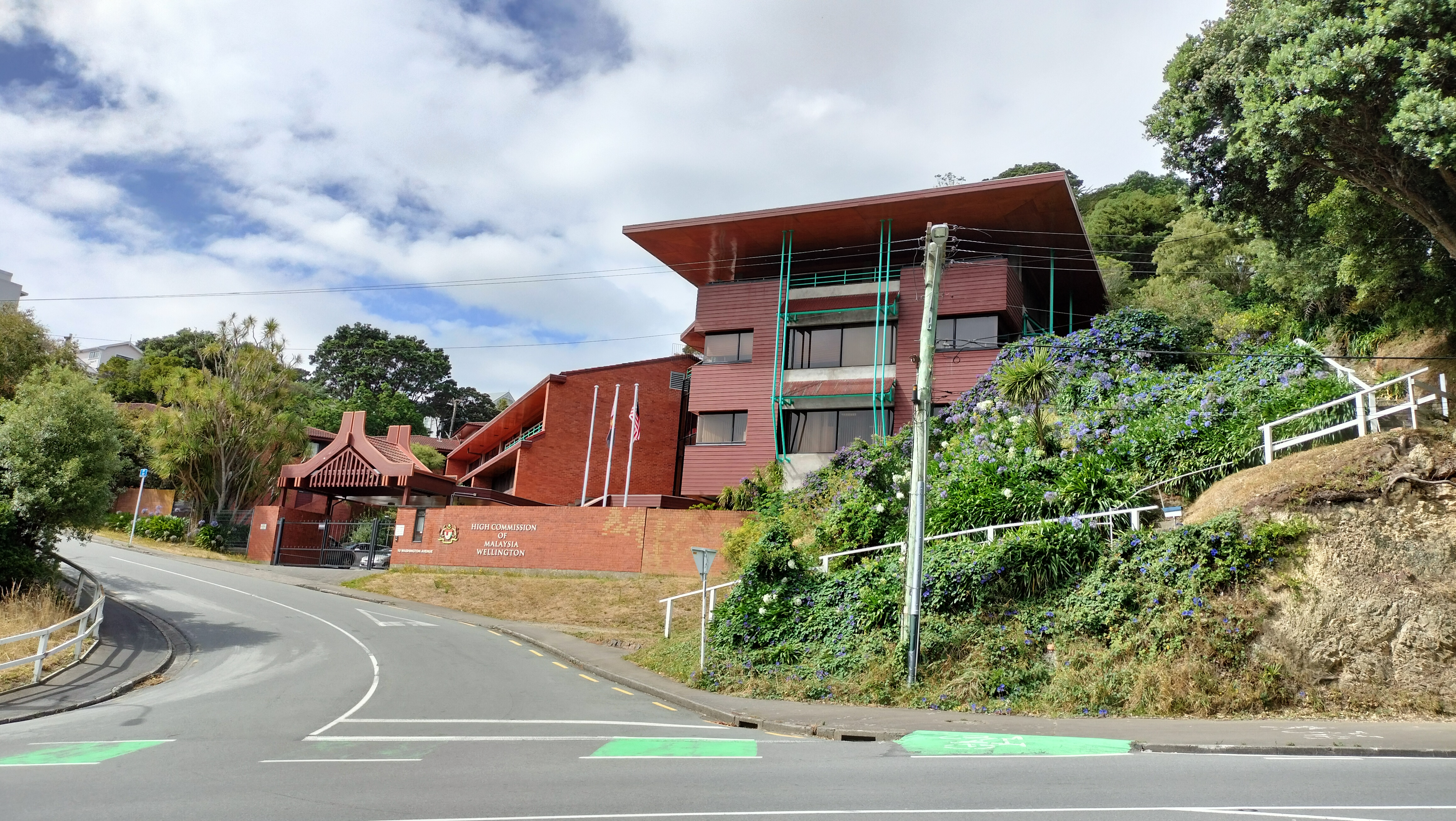
High Commission of Malaysia

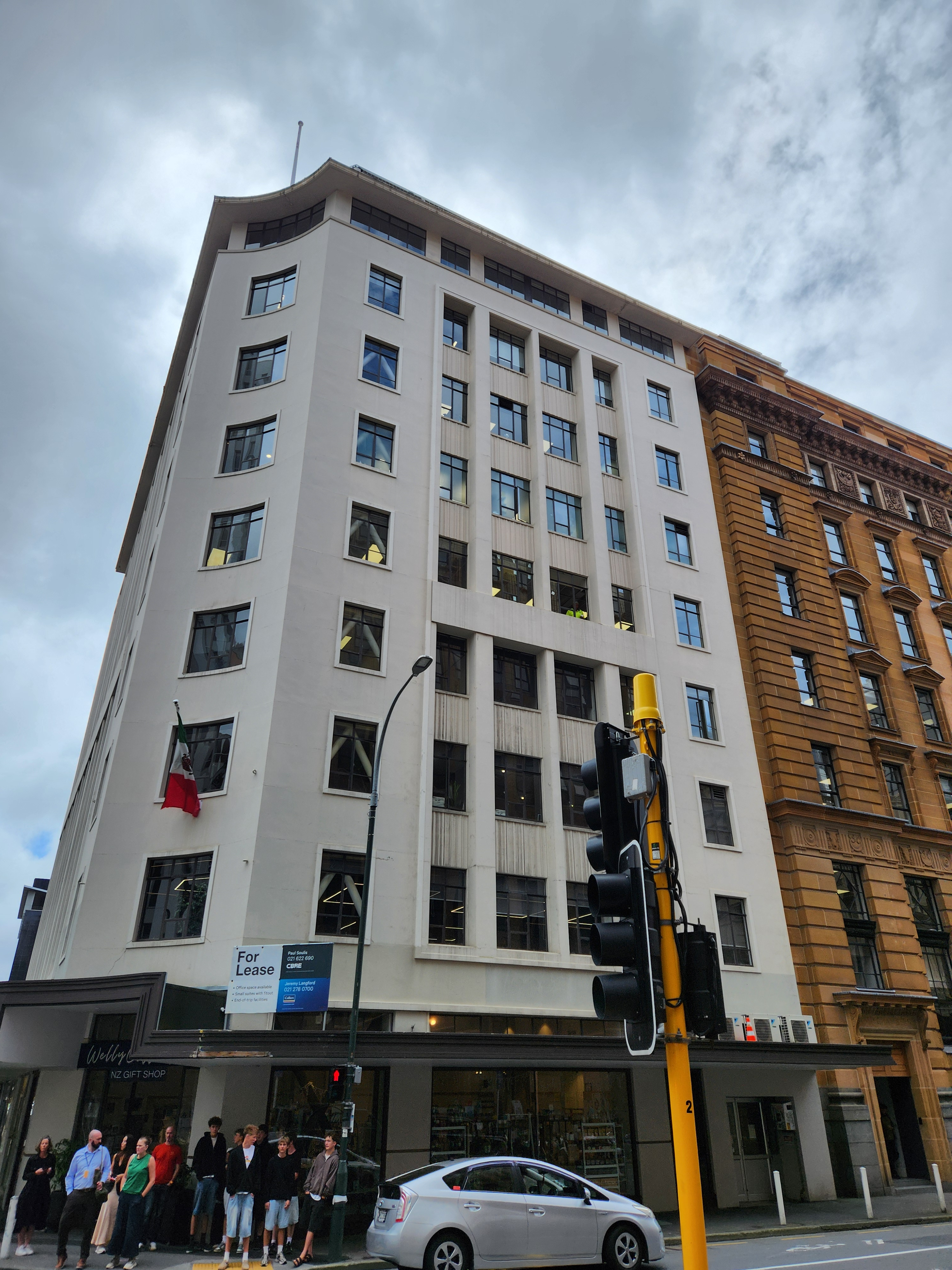
Building hosting the Embassy of Mexico

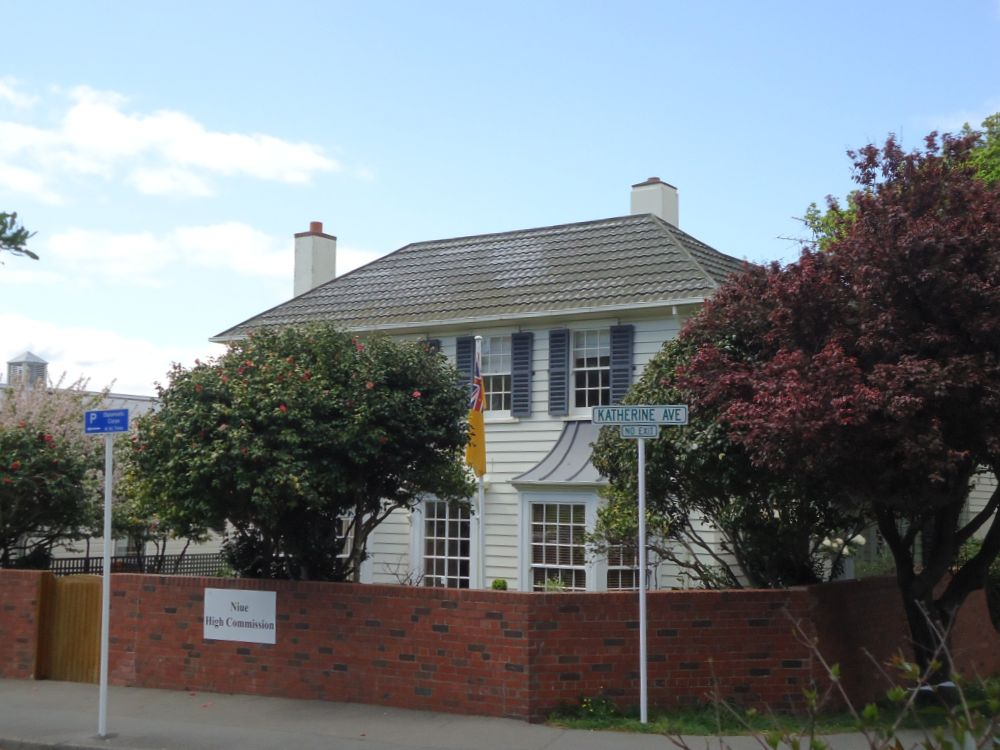
High Commission of Niue

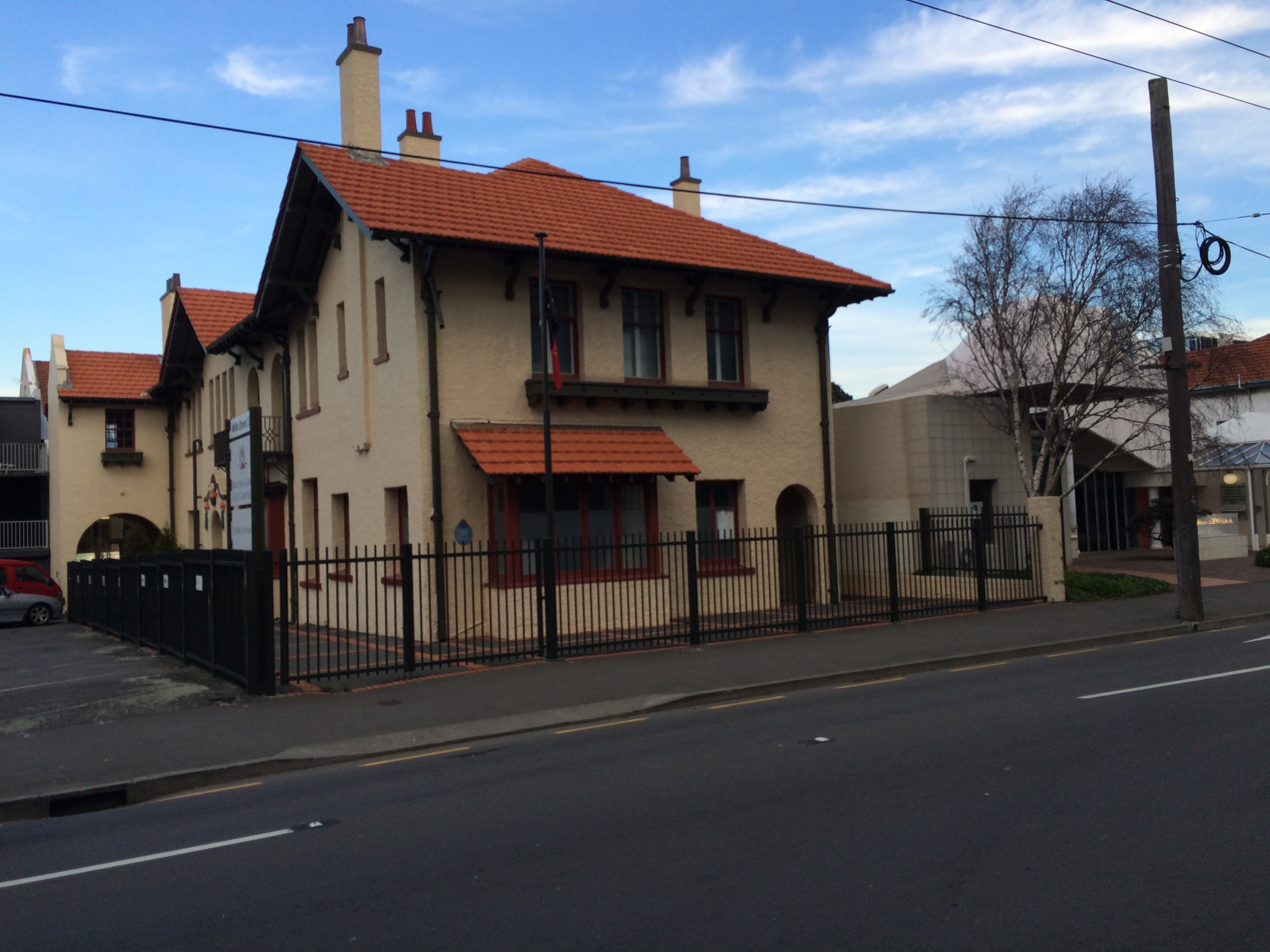
High Commission of Papua New Guinea

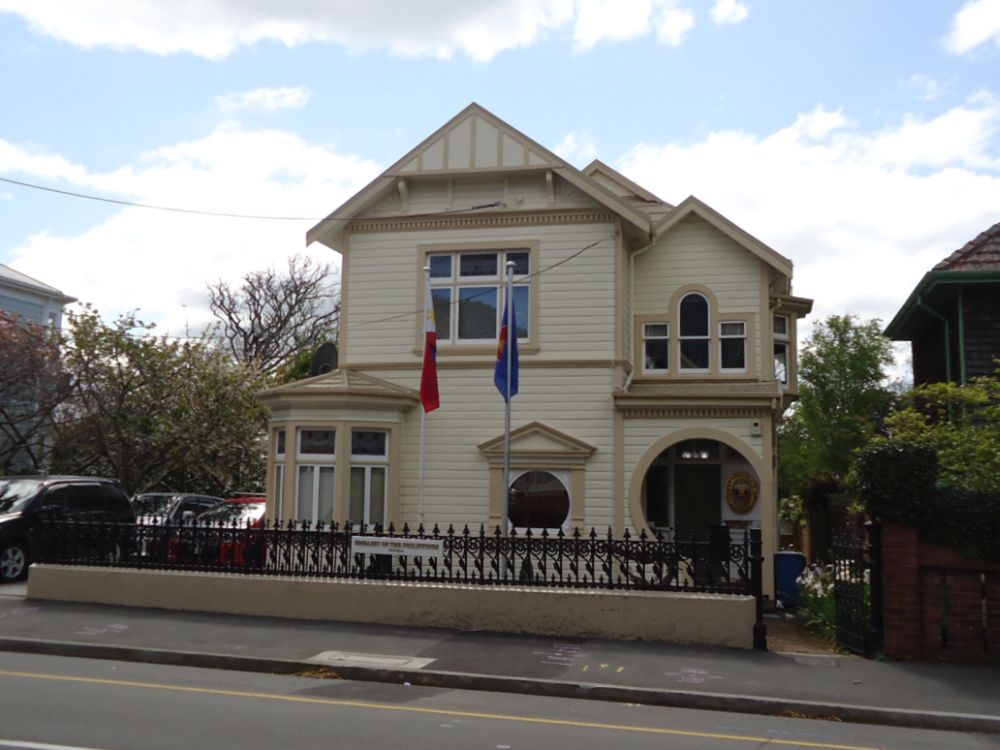
Embassy of the Philippines

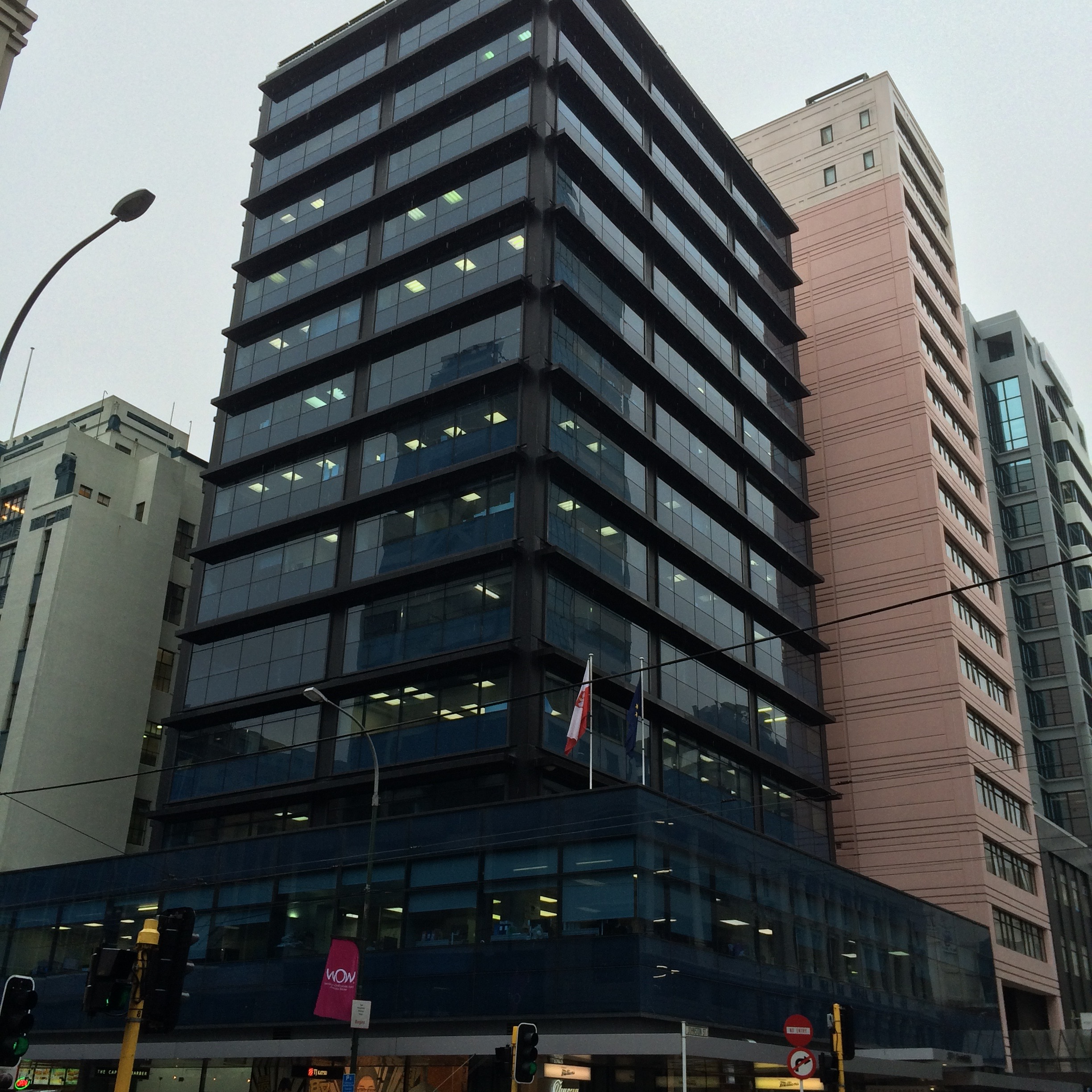
Building hosting the Embassy of Poland

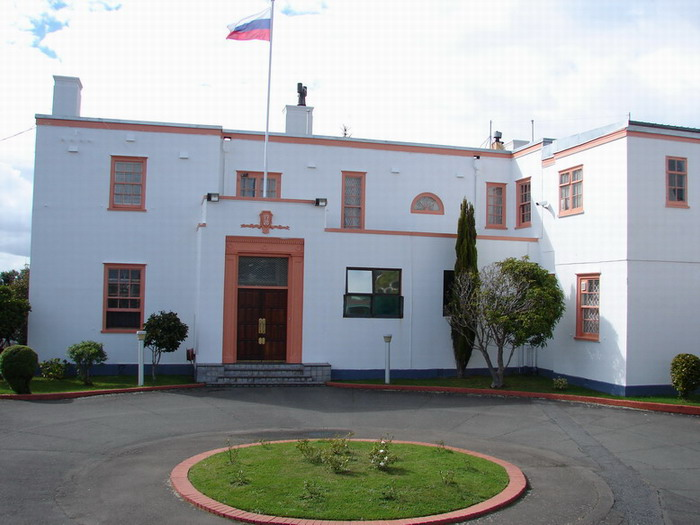
Embassy of Russia

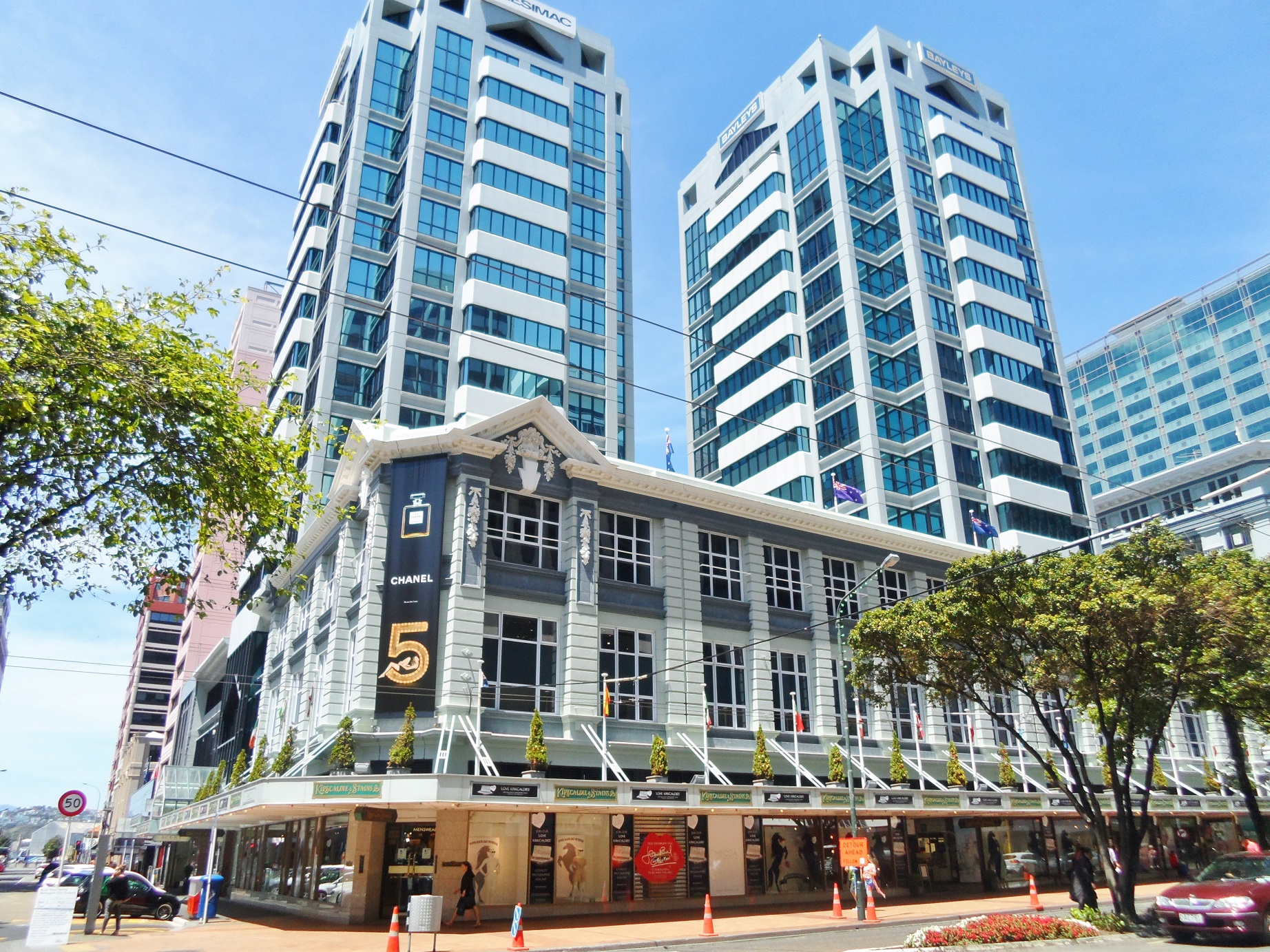
Building hosting the High Commission of South Africa

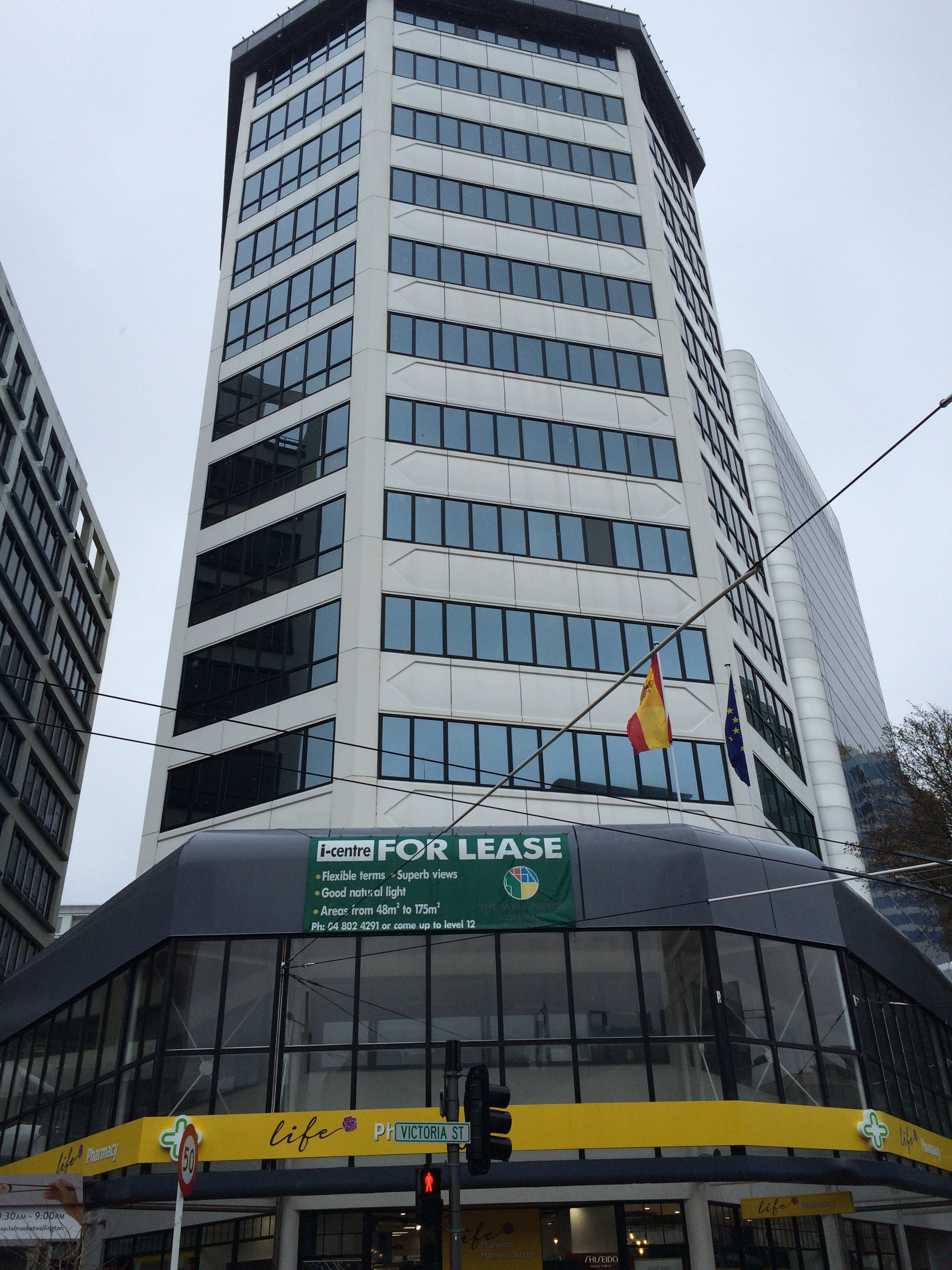
Building hosting the Embassy of Spain

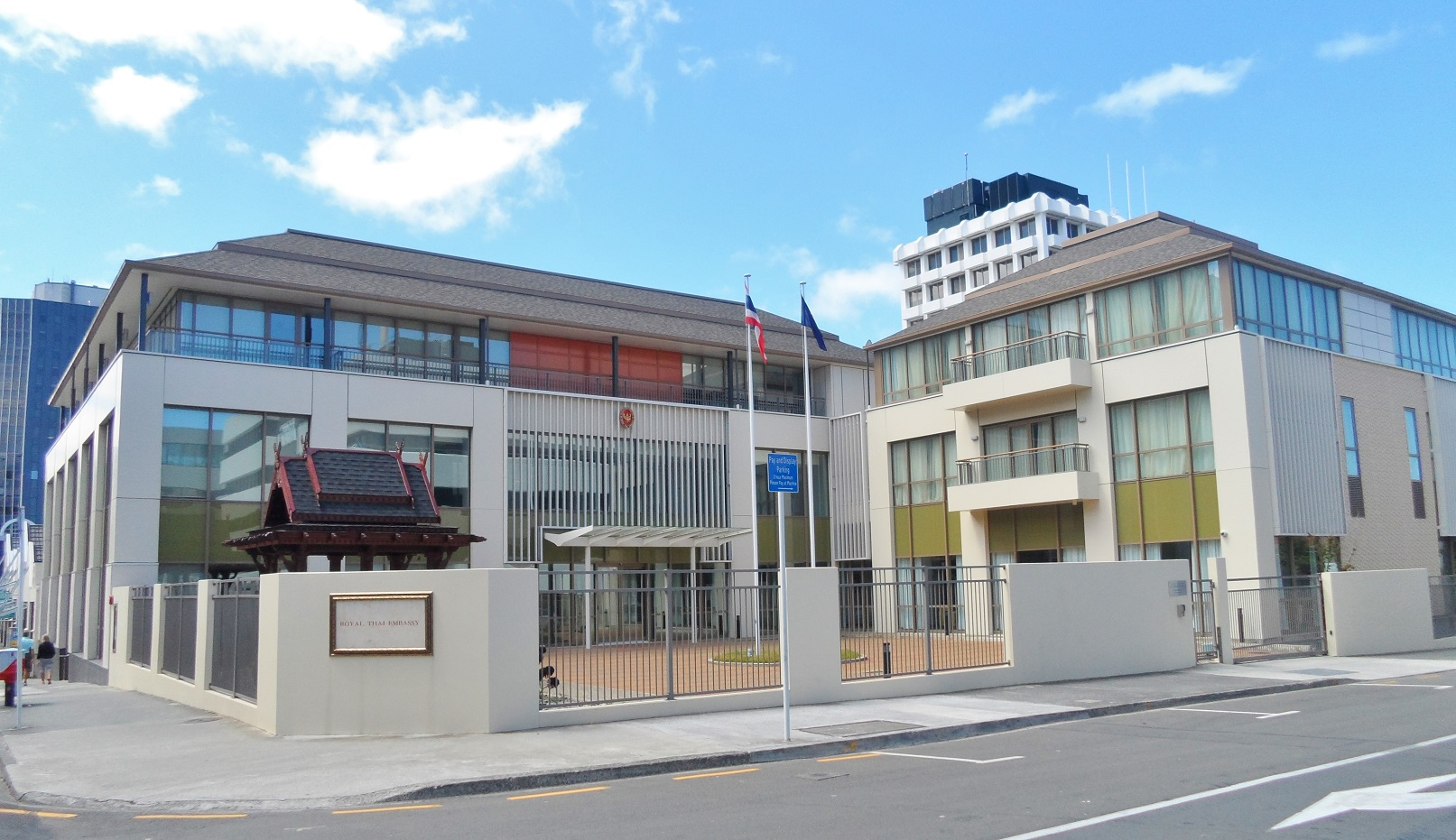
Embassy of Thailand

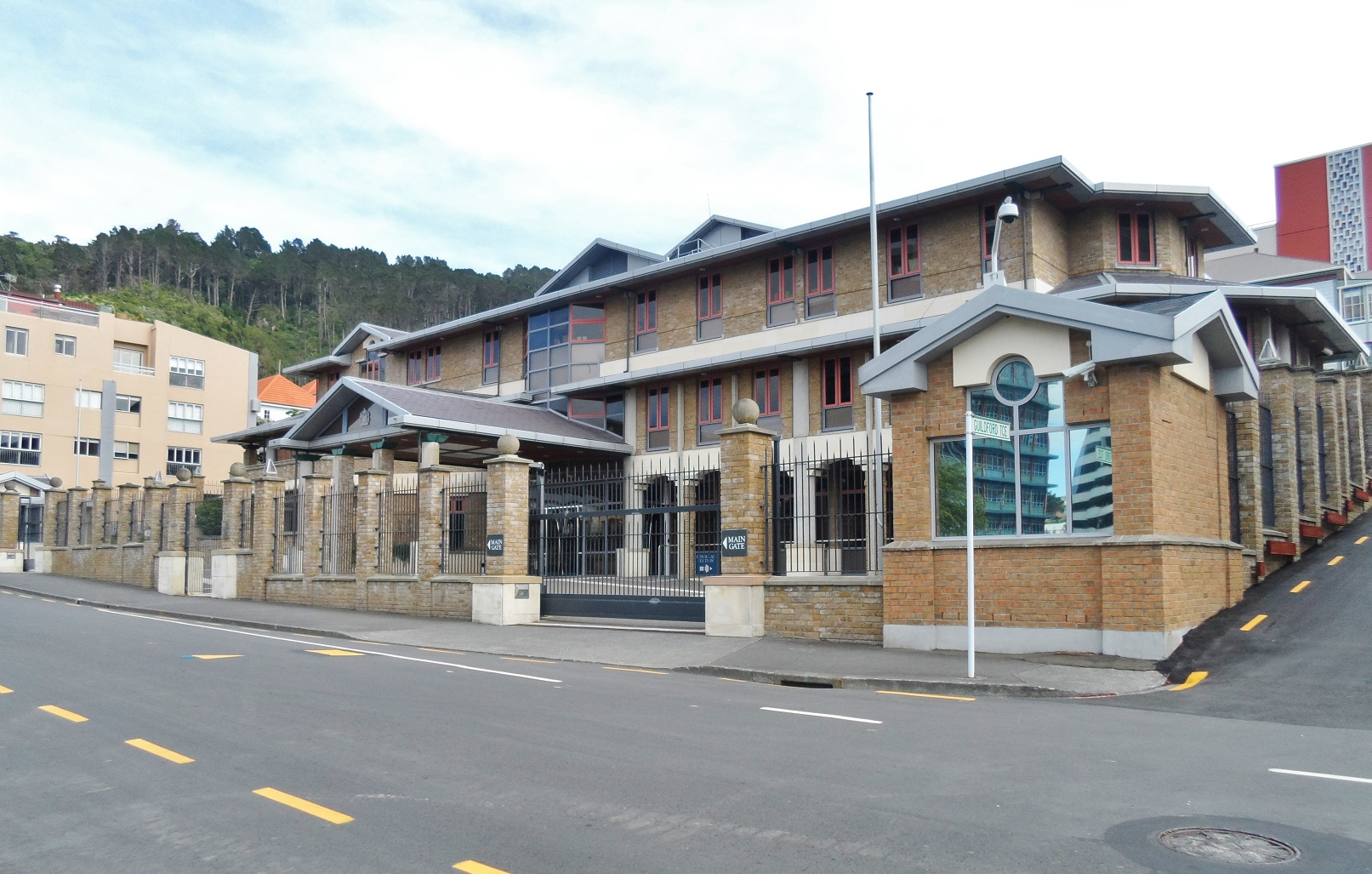
High Commission of the United Kingdom

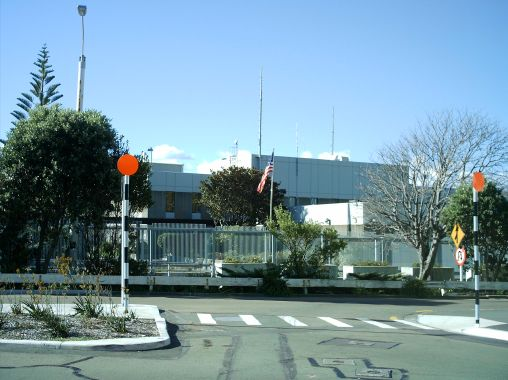
Embassy of the United States

== Consular missions ==
The cities of Auckland and Christchurch are hosts to career consular missions. All entries are consulates-general unless indicated otherwise.

=== Auckland ===
1. Australia
2. China
3. Colombia
4. Cook Islands
5. India
6. Japan
7. Samoa
8. Saudi Arabia
9. South Korea (Consulate)
10. Taiwan (Economic & Cultural Office)
11. Tonga
12. United Kingdom
13. United States
14. Vanuatu
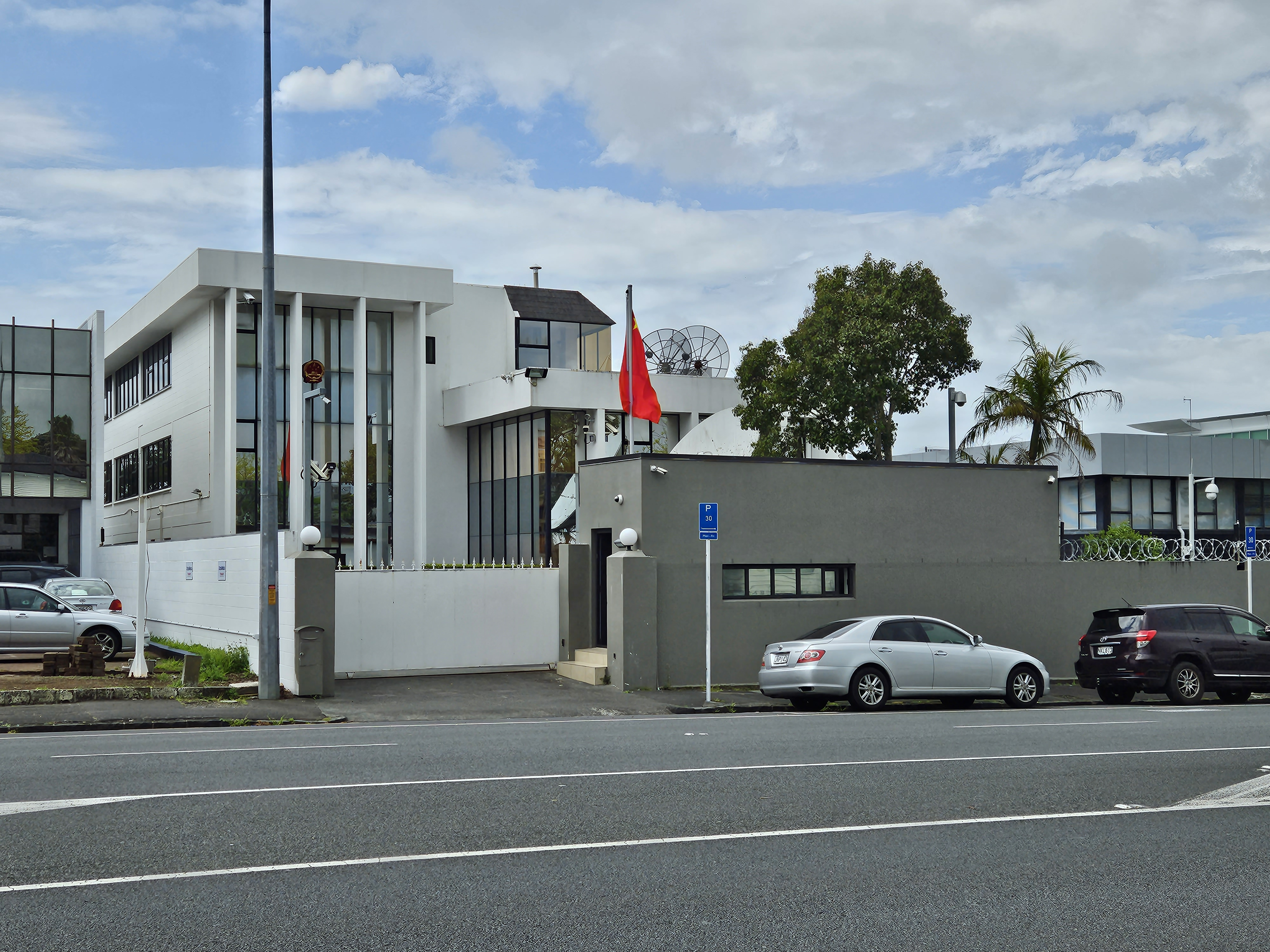
Consulate-General of China

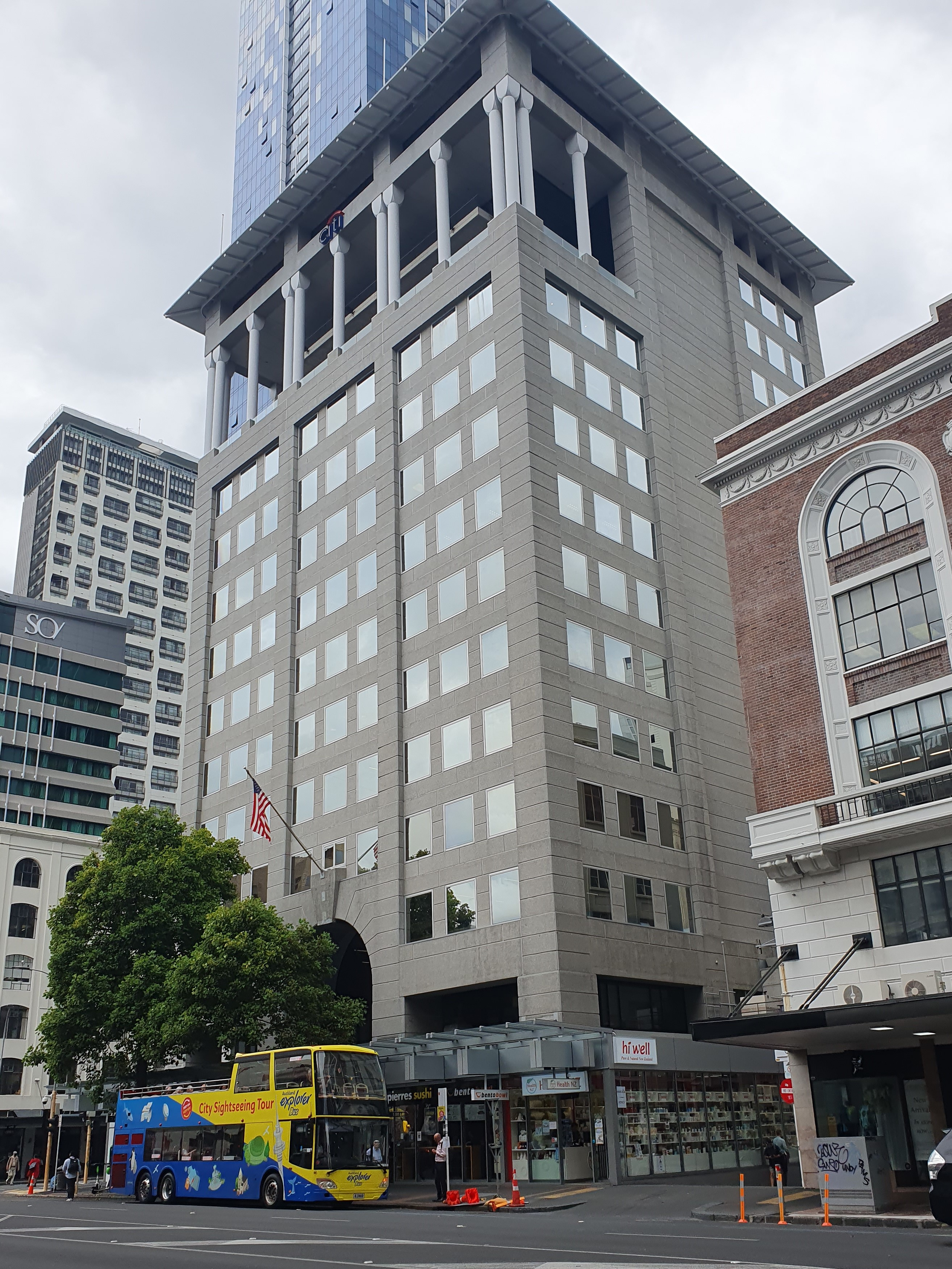
Consulate-General of the United States

=== Christchurch ===
1. China
2. Japan (Consular office)

== Non-resident representation ==
=== Resident in Beijing, China ===
1. Albania
2. Eritrea
3. Guyana
4. Sierra Leone
5. Suriname

=== Resident in Canberra, Australia ===
1. Afghanistan
2. Algeria
3. Angola
4. Austria
5. Azerbaijan
6. Belgium
7. Bosnia and Herzegovina
8. Botswana
9. Brunei
10. Bulgaria
11. Cambodia
12. Costa Rica
13. Croatia
14. Cyprus
15. Czechia
16. Denmark
17. Ecuador
18. El Salvador
19. Estonia
20. Ethiopia
21. Finland
22. Greece
23. Georgia
24. Ghana
25. Guatemala
26. Jordan
27. Kenya
28. Kosovo
29. Laos
30. Latvia
31. Lebanon
32. Libya
33. Lithuania
34. Malta
35. Mauritius
36. Mongolia
37. Morocco
38. Myanmar
39. Nauru
40. Nepal
41. Nigeria
42. North Macedonia
43. Norway
44. Panama
45. Portugal
46. Qatar
47. Romania
48. Serbia
49. Slovakia
50. Slovenia
51. Sweden
52. Uganda
53. Ukraine
54. Uruguay
55. Venezuela
56. Zambia
57. Zimbabwe

=== Resident in Jakarta, Indonesia ===
1. Bahrain
2. North Korea
3. Tanzania
4. Tunisia

=== Resident in New Delhi, India ===
1. Iceland
2. Niger
3. Seychelles

=== Resident in Singapore ===
1. Kazakhstan
2. Maldives
3. Rwanda
4. Uzbekistan

=== Resident in Tokyo, Japan ===
1. Armenia
2. Belarus
3. Benin
4. Burkina Faso
5. Cameroon
6. Djibouti
7. Dominican Republic
8. Guinea
9. Jamaica
10. Kyrgyzstan
11. Lesotho
12. Liberia
13. Malawi
14. Mali
15. Mauritania
16. Mozambique
17. Oman
18. Senegal
19. Turkmenistan

=== Resident in other cities ===
1. Bahamas (Nassau)
2. Barbados (Ottawa)
3. Bolivia (Ottawa)
4. Central African Republic (Pretoria)
5. Eswatini (Kuala Lumpur)
6. Marshall Islands (Suva)
7. Montenegro (Podgorica)

== Closed missions ==
Host city	Sending country	Mission	Year closed	Ref.
Wellington	Greece	Embassy	Unknown	
Wellington	Romania	Embassy	1989	
Wellington	Sweden	Embassy	1995	
Wellington	Yugoslavia	Embassy	Unknown	

== See also ==
- Foreign relations of New Zealand
- List of diplomatic missions of New Zealand
- Visa policy of New Zealand
