= Yabezi Kiiza =

Ugandan politician (1938–2016)

Prime Minister of Bunyoro
- In office 7 March 2009 – January 2012
- Monarch: Solomon Iguru I
- Preceded by: Emmanuel Aliba Kiiza
- Succeeded by: Bonny Kyaligonza (acting)

Personal details
- Born: 20 January 1938
- Died: 1 August 2016 (aged 78) Masindi, Western Region, Uganda

Yabezi Kiiza (20 January 1938 – 1 August 2016) was a Ugandan politician and civil engineer. He served as the 13th Prime Minister of Bunyoro, one of Uganda's traditional kingdoms, under Omukama Solomon Iguru I from 2009 to 2012.

== Career ==
Kiiza was a civil engineer. He was appointed Deputy Prime Minister of Bunyoro in 2007. He became the kingdom's Prime Minister in March 2009 following the firing of predecessor, Prime Minister Emmanuel Aliba Kiiza.

Kiiza stepped down as Bunyoro's Prime Minister in January 2012, citing declining health, including diabetes and high blood pressure. Kiiza submitted his letter of resignation on 5 January 2012, and retired from office by the end of January.

== Death ==
Yabezi Kiiza died from complications of diabetes and hypertension at Masindi Kitara Medical Centre in Masindi on 1 August 2016, at the age of 78.

== See also ==
- Edith Sempala
- Dennis Galabuzi Ssozi
