= Uganda Radio Network =

Ugandan media

Coordinates: 00°20′37″N 32°35′00″E

- Company type: Private
- Industry: News media
- Founded: January 1, 2005; 21 years ago
- Area served: Uganda
- Key people: Samuel Gummah Nabaasa; Country Director
- Products: News agency
- Website: Homepage

The Uganda Radio Network (URN) is an independent Ugandan subscription-based news agency headquartered in Kampala.

== Location ==
The headquarters of URN are located off Mawanda Road, in the Kamwookya neighborhood of Kampala, the capital and largest city of Uganda. The coordinates of the company headquarters are 0°20'37.0"N 32°35'00.0"E (Latitude:0.343609; Longitude:32.583346). URN maintains news bureaus in 14 major urban centers in Uganda, including Kampala, Arua, Fort Portal, Gulu, Hoima, Jinja, Kabale, Kitgum, Luweero, Masaka, Mbale, Mbarara, Moroto, and Soroti.

== Overview ==
URN's news articles and programs are available on a monthly subscription basis in text, audio, and photo formats on the URN website. URN supplies audio, visual, and written news reports and programs to participating radio stations, television stations, newspapers, and other print media in Uganda. In addition to capturing, processing, and disseminating news, URN trains journalists, especially those from disadvantaged communities so that they can become better intermediaries in their dual role of capturing and disseminating news.

== See also ==
- List of newspapers in Uganda
