= Mvara Secondary School =

Secondary school in Uganda

Location
- Mvara, Arua, Arua District; Uganda; 03°01′24″N 30°55′38″E

Information
- Type: Public middle school and high school (8–13)
- Religious affiliation: Church of Uganda
- Established: January 1, 1960; 66 years ago
- Headteacher: Matua Eliakim Onyiga
- Enrollment: 1108 (796 males & 312 females) (2020)
- Athletics: Rugby, football, track, tennis, volleyball, basketball

Mvara Secondary School is a mixed (day and boarding), co-educational secondary school in Arua District in the Northern Region of Uganda.

== Location ==
The school is located in Mvara, Mvara Parish, Arua Hill Sub-county, within the city of Arua, the largest urban centre in the West Nile sub-region, in northwestern Uganda. The school campus is approximately 3.5 kilometres (2 mi), by road, southeast of the central business district of Arua. The geographical coordinates of the school are: 03°01'24.0"N, 30°55'38.0"E (Latitude:3.023333; Longitude:30.927222).

== History ==
Mvara Secondary School was established in 1960 by the Church Missionary Society. With peaceful relations between faculty and students since inception, Mvara began to experience a series of student strikes beginning circa 2016. The strikes were particularly worrisome as they were of a violent nature and involved destruction of school property.

More violence broke out in 2017, this time between students of Mvara Secondary School and St. Joseph’s College Ombaci, again leading to destruction of school property at both schools.

Back in 2010 the Mvara Old Students Association identified lack of career guidance at the school as a major contributor to poor academic performance of the students.

== Prominent alumni ==
Some of the prominent alumni of the school include: (a) Peace Proscovia Drajole Agondua, a professional Ugandan netball player and the current captain of the Uganda national netball team, who also plays for the Sunshine Coast Lightning in the Australian Super Netball League.

== See also ==
- Education in Uganda
- List of schools in Uganda
