= Nusura Tiperu =

Ugandan diplomat and politician

Ambassador of Uganda to Turkey

Personal details
- Born: 21 October 1974 (age 52) Yumbe, Uganda
- Citizenship: Uganda
- Education: Makerere University (BA.Soc.Sc.)
- Occupation: Diplomat and politician

Nusura Tiperu (born 21 October 1974) is a Ugandan diplomat and politician with vast experience as a National and East African legislator. She served as Uganda's first National Female Youth Member of Parliament following the promulgation of the 1995 Constitution.

From 2001 to 2006, she was elected to represent the women of Yumbe in the Parliament of Uganda and was instrumental in the process towards the pacification of Northern Uganda. She is an advocate of peace.

From June 2007 to June 2017, Tiperu served two consecutive terms as one of the nine members representing Uganda in the 2nd and 3rd East African Legislative Assembly (EALA) in Arusha, Tanzania, the headquarters of this assembly.

She was nominated to represent the Government of the Republic of Uganda as one of the council members of the Islamic University in Uganda, affiliated with the Organisation of Islamic Conference (OIC) based in Uganda.

Tiperu was appointed as Uganda's ambassador to Türkiye in December 2021.

== Early life and education ==
Tiperu was born in Yumbe District, West Nile sub-region, in Northern Uganda on 21 October 1974.

She attended Mukono Town Academy in Mukono District for her A-Level studies, from 1992 to 1993. She then entered Makerere University, Uganda's oldest university, where she studied Social Sciences from 1994 to 1997. She graduated with the degree of Bachelor of Arts in Social Sciences.

== Political career ==
From 1996 to 2001, Tiperu served as the Female Youth Member of Parliament, representing all young women in Uganda. She was then elected to serve as the Woman Member of Parliament, representing Yumbe District in Parliament from 2001 until 2006. From 2007 to 2012, she served in the East African Legislative Assembly in Arusha, Tanzania, representing the Republic of Uganda. In June 2012, she was re-elected to serve in the same capacity for another five-year term.

== Other responsibilities ==
Tiperu is a historical member of the Central Executive Committee of the National Resistance Movement, the ruling political party in Uganda since 1986. She is also the chairperson of the International Muslim Women's Union.

She is a mother of three: two girls and one boy.

She is fluent in English, Swahili, Alur, Aringa and Luganda.

From 2012 until 2015, Tiperu served as a member of the EALA Commission. The commission "manages the affairs of the Assembly, organizes the business and program of the House, and nominates members of other committees".

== See also ==
- East African Community
