= Holdsworth (surname) =

Holdsworth is a surname. Notable people with the surname include:

- Holdsworth (Yorkshire cricketer), 19th-century English cricketer
- Alan Holdsworth (born 1952), English musician and disability activist
- Allan Holdsworth (1946–2017), English guitarist and composer
- Andy Holdsworth (born 1984), English footballer
- Annie E. Holdsworth, English writer
- Arthur Howe Holdsworth (1780–1860), English merchant and politician
- B. G. Holdsworth (1892–1949), Indian civil servant
- Barbara Clarke Holdsworth (1929–1912), British author
- Bronwen Holdsworth (born 1943), New Zealand businesswoman
- Chris Holdsworth (born 1987), American mixed martial artist
- Dan Holdsworth (born 1974), British photographer
- Daniel Holdsworth (disambiguation), multiple people
- David Holdsworth (born 1968), English footballer and manager
- Dean Holdsworth (born 1968), English footballer and manager
- Edward Holdsworth (1684–1746), English classical scholar
- Edward Holdsworth Sugden (1854–1935), British Methodist minister
- Ethel Carnie Holdsworth (1886–1962), English writer
- Frank Holdsworth (1872–1941), New Zealand cricketer
- Frank Wild Holdsworth (1904–1969), British orthopaedic surgeon
- Fred Holdsworth (born 1952), American baseball player
- Gary Holdsworth (born 1941), Australian sprinter
- Harry Holdsworth Rawson (1843–1910), British admiral
- Herbert Holdsworth (1890–1949), British politician and businessman
- James B. Holdsworth (c. 1796 – 1859), Canadian merchant and politician
- Jeff Holdsworth (born 1963), American musician
- Jim Holdsworth (1850–1918), American baseball player
- John Holdsworth (referee), English rugby league referee
- John Holdsworth (priest) (born 1949), Welsh priest
- John Holdsworth (rugby union) (1884–?), Australian rugby union player
- Joseph Holdsworth (1789–1857), British politician
- Karen Holdsworth (1960–2013), British marathon runner
- Kelvin Holdsworth (born 1966), Scottish Episcopalian clergyman
- Lee Holdsworth (born 1983), Australian racing driver
- Leslie Holdsworth Allen (1879–1964), Australian academic and poet
- Michaela Denis, née Holdsworth (1914–2002), British filmmaker
- Paul Holdsworth (born 1970), Australian rules footballer
- Petrina Holdsworth (born 1952), English politician
- Philip Holdsworth (1851–1902), Australian poet and public servant
- R. L. Holdsworth (1899–1976), British academic and explorer
- Richard Holdsworth (1590–1649), English academic theologian
- Herbert Holdsworth Ross (1908–1978), British-Canadian entomologist
- Samantha Holdsworth, New Zealand medical physicist
- Ted Holdsworth (born 1984), Australian rules footballer
- Thomas Holdsworth Blake (1792–1849), American politician
- Trevor Holdsworth (1927–2010), English businessman
- Victoria Holdsworth (born 1944), English philanthropist
- Wayne Holdsworth (born 1968), Australian cricketer
- William Holdsworth (disambiguation), multiple people

== See also ==
- Houldsworth
