= Holdsworth (disambiguation) =

Holdsworth was a bicycle manufacturer in London, England.

Holdsworth may also refer to:

- Holdsworth (surname)
- Holdsworth, West Yorkshire, England
- Mount Holdsworth, a mountain of Antarctica
- Holdsworth Glacier, a glacier of Antarctica
- Holdsworth Motorhomes, a defunct British company
- Holdsworth (cycling team)
