= John Holdsworth =

John Holdsworth may refer to:

- John Holdsworth (referee), rugby league referee
- John Holdsworth (priest), Anglican archdeacon
- John Holdsworth (rugby union), Australian rugby union player
