= New Zealand–Taiwan relations =

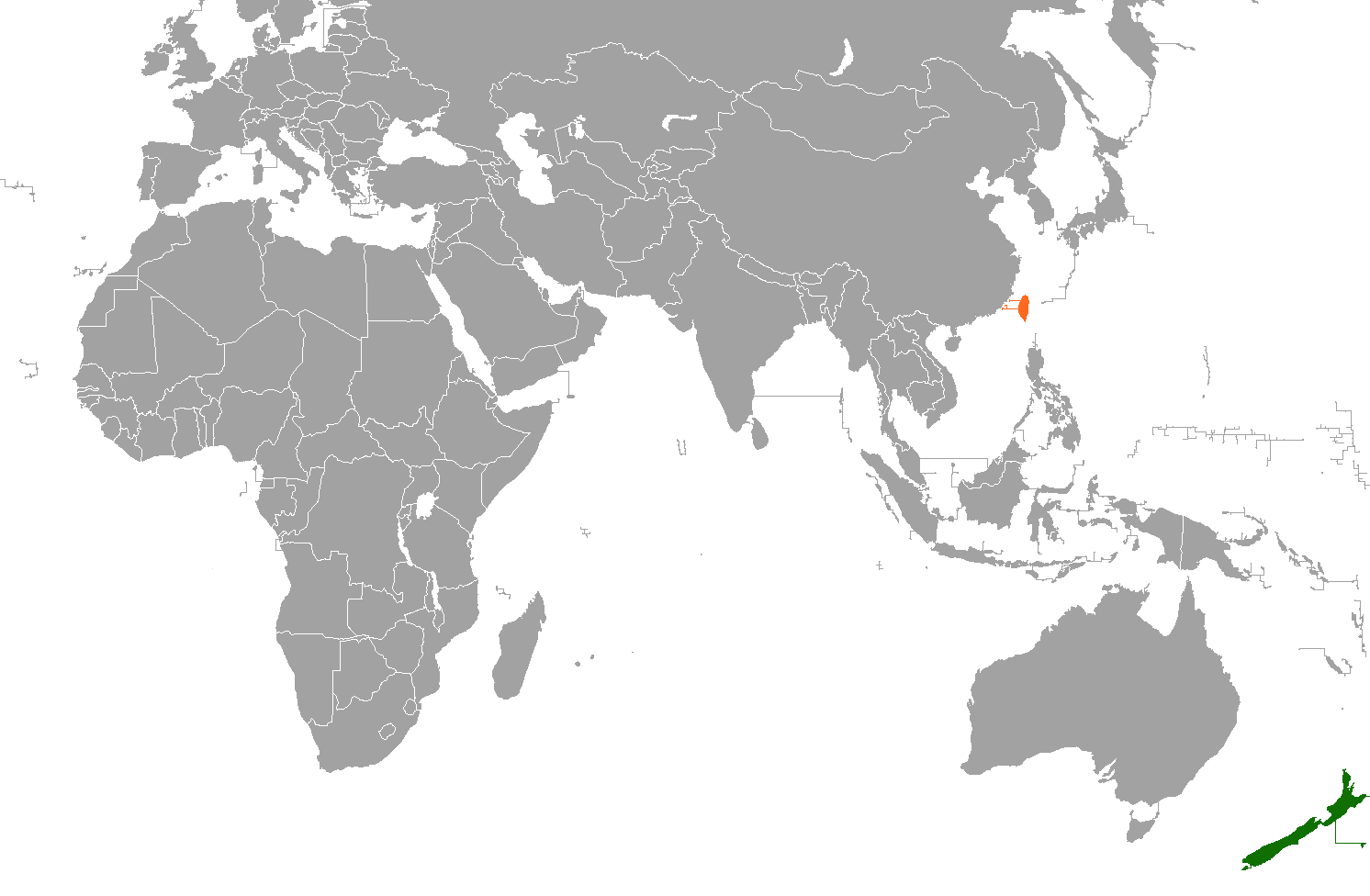

- New Zealand: Taiwan

Diplomatic mission
- New Zealand Commerce and Industry Office, Taipei: Taipei Economic and Cultural Office, Wellington

New Zealand and Taiwan have maintained unofficial bilateral international relations since 1972. Prior to that, formal relations between the two governments traced back to the Qing dynasty, which established a consulate in Wellington. The consulate continued to conduct diplomatic matters under the Republic of China (ROC) government which subsequently retreated to Taiwan in 1949.

In 1972, New Zealand switched formal recognition from the ROC to the People's Republic of China (PRC) and suspended formal relations with Taiwan. In the absence of official diplomatic relations, New Zealand is represented by the New Zealand Commerce and Industry Office, Taipei, and Taiwan by the Taipei Economic and Cultural Office in Wellington.

== 20th century ==
=== Republic of China ===
Prior to 1972, New Zealand recognised the Republic of China (ROC) as the official representative of China. The ROC government's consulate in Wellington had been established in the Qing dynasty to deal with trade, immigration, and local Chinese welfare, and it continued to serve as the primary point of communication between the two governments even after its retreat to Taiwan in 1949. Due to limited trading opportunities with Taiwan, New Zealand declined to establish any embassy or trading post there, preferring to conduct relations via its diplomatic mission in Hong Kong.

In 1960, Prime Minister Keith Holyoake undertook a state visit to Taiwan and was hosted by ROC President Chiang Kai-shek. Holyoake had a favourable view of Chiang's government and upgraded the ROC consulate to full embassy status in 1962. In 1966, New Zealand and Taiwan helped found the Asian and Pacific Council (ASPAC), an anti-Communist consultative body.

Despite interest from the New Zealand Labour Party, foreign affairs officials, and some private sector traders, the New Zealand government declined to establish diplomatic relations or informal relations with the People's Republic of China (PRC) until 1972 due to concern it would encourage the spread of communism in Southeast Asia and its adherence to the American policy of not recognising the PRC. In 1961, New Zealand unsuccessfully sponsored a dual recognition formula that would have allowed both the ROC and PRC to be represented at the United Nations. However, both rejected the proposal due to the One China policy.

Following the 1972 New Zealand general election, the Third Labour Government led by Prime Minister Norman Kirk switched recognition from the ROC to the PRC on 22 December 1972. As part of an agreement between New Zealand's ambassador to the United Nations John Scott and his Chinese counterpart Huang Hua, the two governments agreed that New Zealand could continue trade and other non-official contacts with Taiwan. In late January 1973, the ROC's last ambassador Konsin Shah and his staff left New Zealand, ending formal diplomatic relations between the New Zealand and Taiwan.

=== Unofficial relations ===
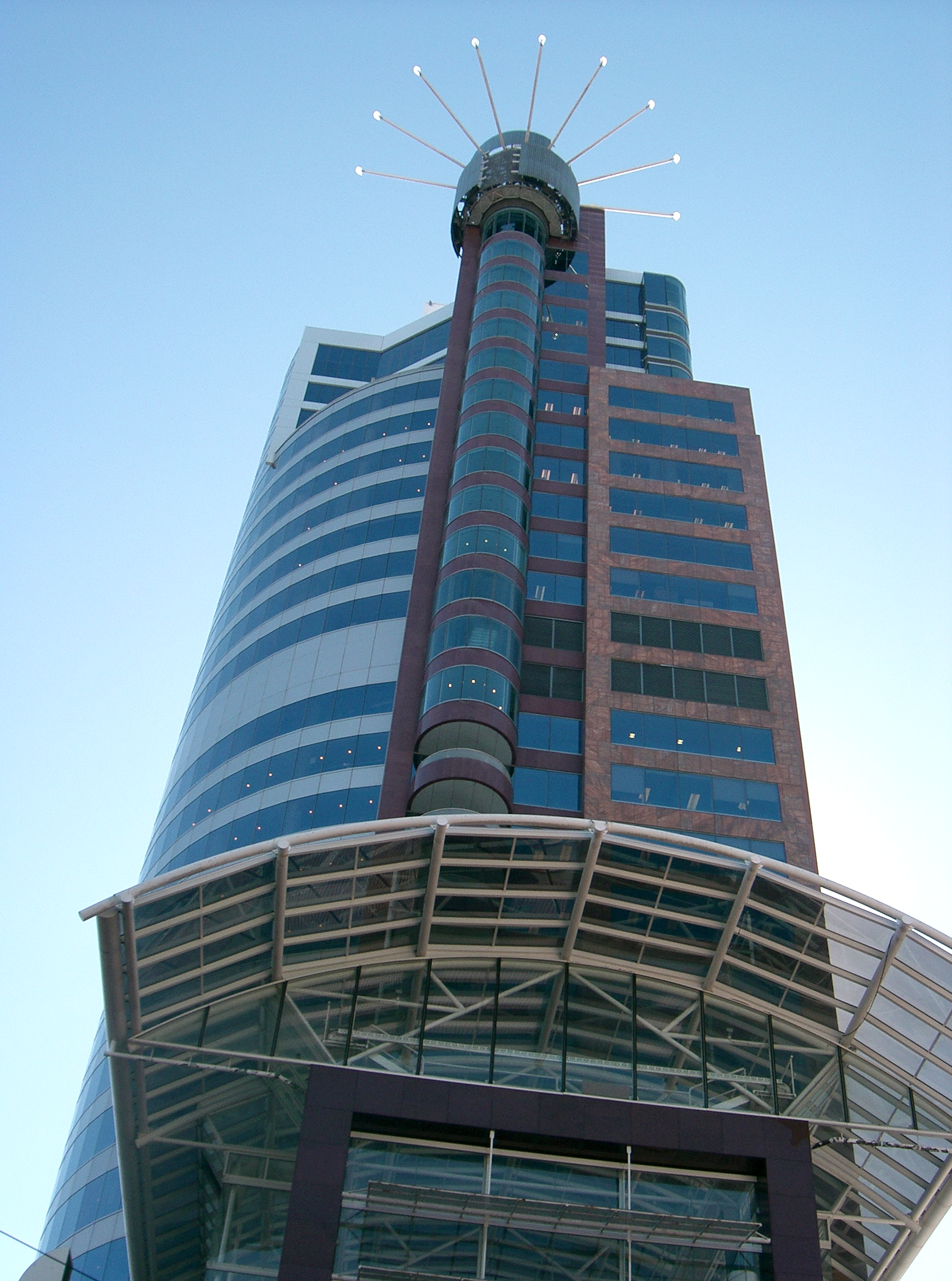
The building housing the Taipei Economic and Culture Office in Wellington

In 1973, a private limited company called the East Asia Trade Centre Limited was established in Auckland to conduct trade relations between New Zealand and Taiwan. Its Taiwanese directors and branch managers were officers seconded from the ROC's Ministry of Foreign Affairs and Ministry of Economic Affairs. To avoid proximity to the Chinese embassy in Wellington, the East Asia Trade Centre was initially based in Auckland, but later opened another office in Wellington. In 1991, these Taiwanese trade offices were renamed Taipei Economic and Culture Offices and the head of the Wellington office became known as Representative.

Despite the termination of diplomatic relations with the ROC, informal trade, tourism, cultural and sporting exchanges continued. In 1975, the Chinese Embassy objected to five visits by Taiwanese swimming, tennis, football, badminton and softball teams to attend sporting events in New Zealand. As a compromise, the New Zealand Foreign Ministry advised visiting Taiwanese teams not to display official ROC badges, flags or sing the ROC anthem while touring New Zealand. By 1976, the New Zealand government and Chinese embassy reached an agreement that Taiwanese teams and delegations would be allowed to visit New Zealand in an unofficial capacity.

Following lobbying from the New Zealand Chamber of Commerce and businesses with links to Taiwan such as Trade Span, the Third National Government's Cabinet permitted the establishment of a New Zealand trade office in Taipei in April 1981. To avoid offending Beijing, this mission would function as a trade office rather than a de facto embassy. The Wellington Chamber of Commerce, with the encouragement of the NZ Chamber of Commerce and New Zealand Taiwan Business Council, subsequently created a trading company called the New Zealand East Asia Trade Development Ltd. This trading company opened a trade promotion office in Taipei called the New Zealand Commerce and Industry Office in 1987.

== 21st century ==
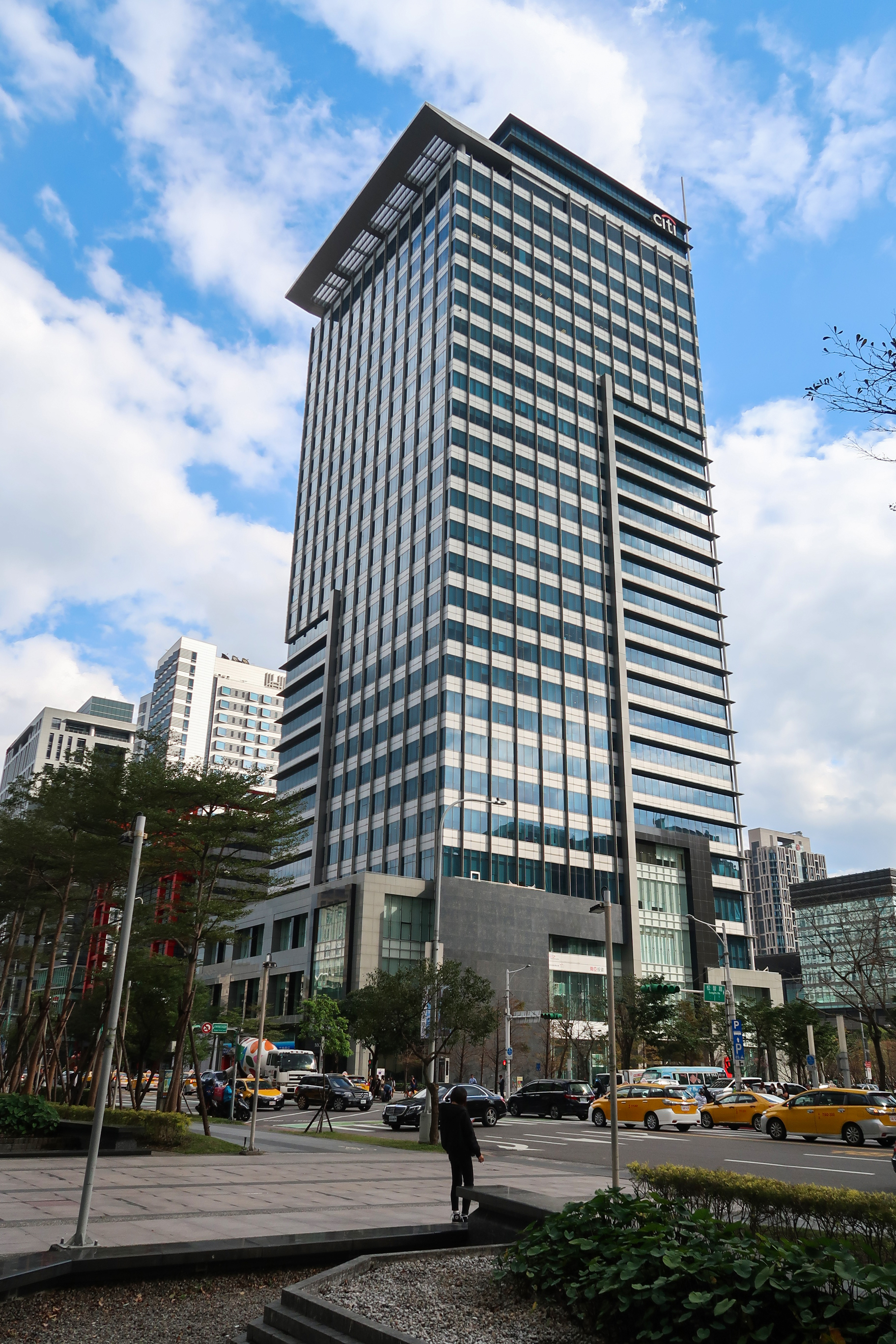
The New Zealand Commerce and Industry Office is located at Walsin Lihwa Building.

In 2013 New Zealand and Taiwan signed a free trade agreement.

In 2020 New Zealand supported Taiwan's participation at the World Health Organization. This stance was condemned by China.

In 2022 Air New Zealand cancelled a contract to repair aircraft engines for Taiwan's military over fears that it could affect New Zealand's trade with China.

In 2022 the Taiwanese representative to New Zealand Bill Keh-Ming Chen suggested that New Zealand should participate in freedom of navigation exercises alongside other countries.

In November 2022 New Zealand Prime Minister Jacinda Ardern raised the issue of China's threats to Taiwan in a conversation with Chinese leader Xi Jinping. China responded publicly to the concerns raised by New Zealand and other nations saying that their relations with Taiwan were an "internal matter" and they would not accept any foreign interference.

In 2023 New Zealand parliamentarians Simon O'Connor and Ingrid Leary inaugurated the All-Party Parliamentary Group on Taiwan to coordinate parliamentary relations between New Zealand and Taiwan. Two ACT MPs visited Taiwan in 2023, followed by a larger group of MPs in 2024.

In late August 2024 New Zealand Prime Minister Christopher Luxon expressed support for Taiwanese participation in the Pacific Islands Forum in response to reports of Chinese plans to lobby for member states to exclude Taiwan from attending the Forum's 2025 event. In early September 2024, China's Ambassador to the Pacific Qian Bo successfully pressured the Forum to remove references to Taiwan in the final communique of the 2024 leaders' summit in Tonga that week.

In mid-April 2025 a cross-party delegation of New Zealand Members of Parliament led by National MP Stuart Smith and Labour MP Tangi Utikere visited Taiwan. Other members of the delegation included National MPs Greg Fleming and Hamish Campbell, New Zealand First MP Jamie Arbuckle, Act MP Cameron Luxton and Labour MP Helen White. The delegation also met with Taiwanese President Lai Ching-Te, who issued a statement thanking the New Zealand Government "reiterating the importance of peace and stability across the Taiwan Strait," though the visit drew complaints from the Chinese embassy.

In November 2025 HMNZS Aotearoa transited the Taiwan Strait, which drew objections from China.

In May 2026, a cross-party delegation of New Zealand MPs consisting of Maureen Pugh, David Wilson, Laura McClure and Duncan Webb visited Taiwan, meeting with Taiwanese legislators and foreign ministry officials. In response, the Chinese government in early June 2026 banned the four from visiting China, Hong Kong and Macau for a year on the grounds that their actions violated the One China policy. The Chinese embassy in New Zealand also stated that their travel ban could be waived or eased if they "apologised" for their actions. Prime Minister Christopher Luxon described the ban on the four legislators as "entirely inappropriate" and said that the New Zealand government would raise the matter with their Chinese counterparts.

== Economic relations ==
Taiwan and New Zealand are both significant donor nations to small Pacific states. Both have faced strategic competition from China in this region. In May 2023 Taiwanese foreign minister Joseph Wu called for increased investment from New Zealand in the Pacific.

== Cultural ties ==
New Zealand and Taiwan have increasingly facilitated exchange programming between their indigenous peoples. Academic theory posits that the indigenous peoples of Taiwan share a historical heritage with the Māori people.

== Representation ==
The Taipei Economic and Cultural Office in Wellington represents Taiwan's interests in New Zealand. Similarly, there is a New Zealand Commerce and Industry Office in Taipei.

== See also ==
- Foreign relations of New Zealand
- Foreign relations of Taiwan
