= List of diplomatic missions of New Zealand =

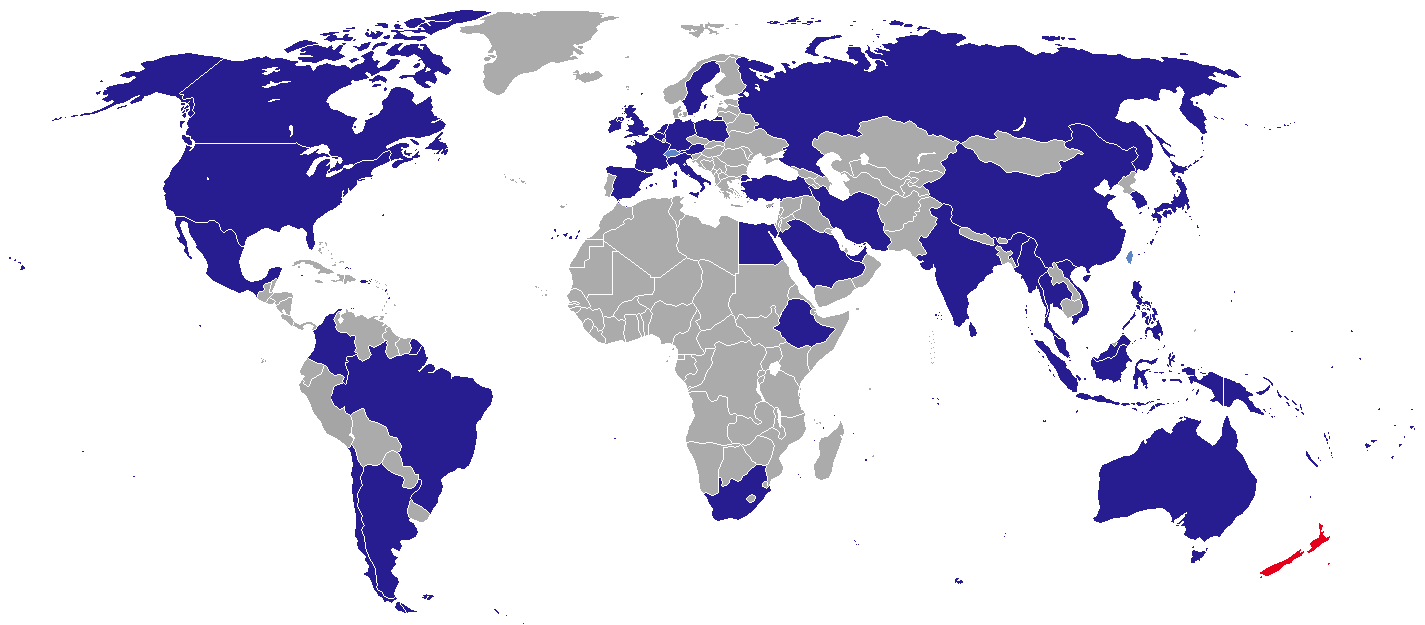
Countries hosting New Zealand diplomatic missions

This is a list of diplomatic missions of New Zealand. New Zealand's Ministry of Foreign Affairs and Trade (NZMFAT) is responsible for nearly fifty embassies and consulates globally. The country is particularly active in the South Pacific, as well as in Asia and South America where it is expanding its commercial reach.

As New Zealand is a member of the Commonwealth of Nations, its diplomatic missions in the capitals of fellow member-states are called High Commissions, as opposed to embassies.

This listing excludes honorary consulates and trade offices, except for the New Zealand Commerce and Industry Office in Taipei, which serves as a de facto embassy to Taiwan.

== History ==
New Zealand independence was a gradual process, and the establishment of an independent New Zealand diplomatic service was similarly gradual. At first, New Zealand's foreign affairs were handled by the United Kingdom, and the only diplomacy conducted by the colonial government in New Zealand were negotiations with the British authorities. Relations between New Zealand and Britain were handled by an Agent-General in London, with the first being appointed in 1871. The title was changed to High Commissioner in 1905, reflecting the increasing autonomy of New Zealand.

It was not until World War II, however, that New Zealand sent permanent diplomatic missions to other countries. To facilitate co-ordination of the war effort New Zealand established several posts in countries with which it was allied—the first was a legation in the United States in 1941. In 1942 and 1943, high commissions were opened in Ottawa and Canberra respectively, and in 1944, a legation was established in the Soviet Union. The latter was considered a striking departure from New Zealand's previous diplomatic activities—enthusiasm for the post was strongest in the governing Labour Party, and the opposition National Party later made its closure one of their campaign policies.

The opening of these posts prompted New Zealand to establish its own foreign ministry, the Department of External Affairs. Created by the External Affairs Act in June 1943, the new department incorporated an older office of the same name (dealing with island territories) and those sections of the Prime Minister's office which had previously co-ordinated diplomacy.

In 1947, a resident trade representative was appointed in Japan, followed by the establishment of legations in Paris (1949) and The Hague (1950). By the late 1950s, these three posts, along with Washington, had been upgraded to embassies. However, the Moscow post was closed in 1950 by the new National Party government. From 1955 to 1961, a string of new missions opened in Asia — Singapore, India, Thailand, Malaysia, Hong Kong, and Indonesia. When Samoa obtained its independence from New Zealand in 1962, it became the first Pacific Island state to host a New Zealand diplomatic post.

The mid-1960s saw a cluster of new posts opening in Europe, with new missions in Belgium, Greece, Germany and Italy. A post was also opened in South Vietnam due to the ongoing conflict there, although this did not last beyond the end of the Vietnam War. A post was established in the Cook Islands after they obtained self-government from New Zealand, becoming New Zealand's second mission in the south Pacific.

The 1970s and 1980s were a time of continued expansion for NZMFAT. In 1973, the Labour government of Norman Kirk reopened its embassy in the Soviet Union and opened an embassy in the People's Republic of China. However it was in the Pacific where New Zealand's representation rapidly expanded as several countries gained independence, including Fiji, Papua New Guinea, the Solomon Islands, Kiribati, Niue, Tonga, and Vanuatu. Frequently New Zealand was the first country to establish a mission in these states. New Zealand also expanded into the Middle East, Latin America, Africa, and elsewhere in Asia.

The early 1990s were a time of substantial reorganisation of New Zealand's diplomatic missions, and saw a number of closures. A substantial redistribution of New Zealand's European resources took place—posts in Greece and Austria were closed, while a new post was established in Spain. New Zealand's post in Iraq was closed due to the Gulf War, and the post in Bahrain was shut shortly afterwards—the post in Saudi Arabia assumed most of its duties, aided by a new post in Turkey. The end of apartheid in resulted in a decision to move New Zealand's post in Zimbabwe to South Africa. In South America New Zealand's embassy in Peru was also closed, but missions were opened in Brazil and Argentina.

In April 2008 it was announced that the budget for NZMFAT would be dramatically increased, and would include the opening of new missions in Stockholm and Brisbane. In 2018, New Zealand established its first resident embassy in Ireland.

== Current missions ==
=== Africa ===
Host country	Host city	Mission	Year Opened	Concurrent accreditation	Ref.
Egypt	Cairo	Embassy	2006	Countries: Algeria; Lebanon; Libya; Palestine; Tunisia	
Ethiopia	Addis Ababa	Embassy	2013	Countries: Djibouti; Ghana; Kenya; Nigeria; Rwanda; Seychelles; Uganda; International Organizations: African Union (Note: Accredited as an observer mission.)	
South Africa	Pretoria	High Commission	1996	Countries: Angola; Botswana; Eswatini; Lesotho; Malawi; Mauritius; Mozambique; Namibia; Tanzania; Zambia; Zimbabwe	

=== Americas ===
Host country	Host city	Mission	Year Opened	Concurrent accreditation	Ref.
Argentina	Buenos Aires	Embassy	1998	Countries: Paraguay; Uruguay	
Brazil	Brasília	Embassy	2001		
Brazil	São Paulo	Consulate-General	2022		
Canada	Ottawa	High Commission	1942		
Canada	Vancouver	Consulate-General	2022		
Chile	Santiago de Chile	Embassy	1972	Countries: Bolivia; Peru	
Colombia	Bogotá	Embassy	2018	Countries: Ecuador; Dominican Republic; Panama	
Mexico	Mexico City	Embassy	1983	Countries: Costa Rica; Cuba; El Salvador; Guatemala; Nicaragua; Venezuela	
United States	Washington, D.C.	Embassy	1941		
United States	Honolulu	Consulate-General	2014	Countries: Marshall Islands; Micronesia; Palau	
United States	Los Angeles	Consulate-General	1935		
United States	New York City	Consulate-General	1947		

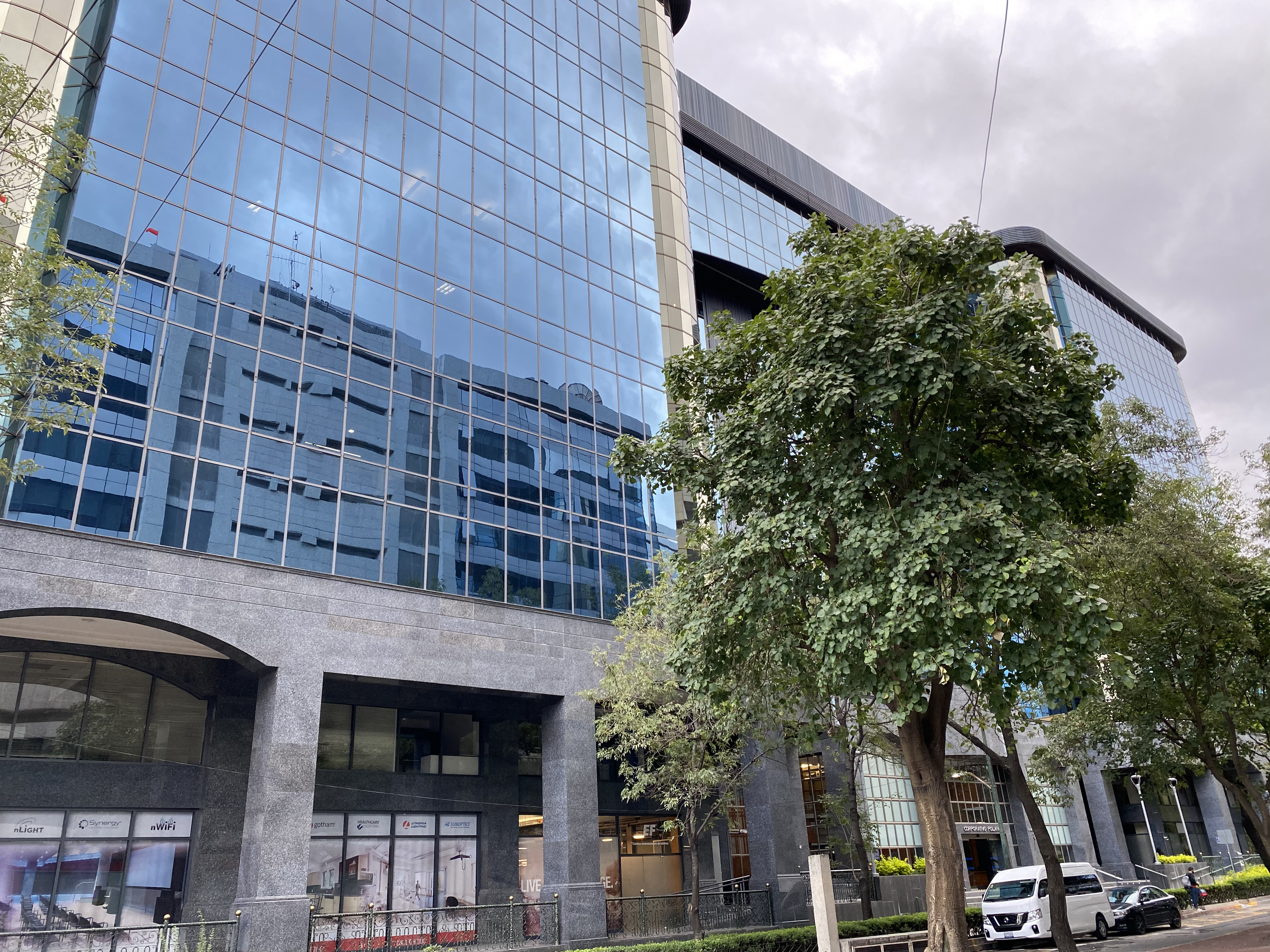
Building hosting the Embassy in Mexico City

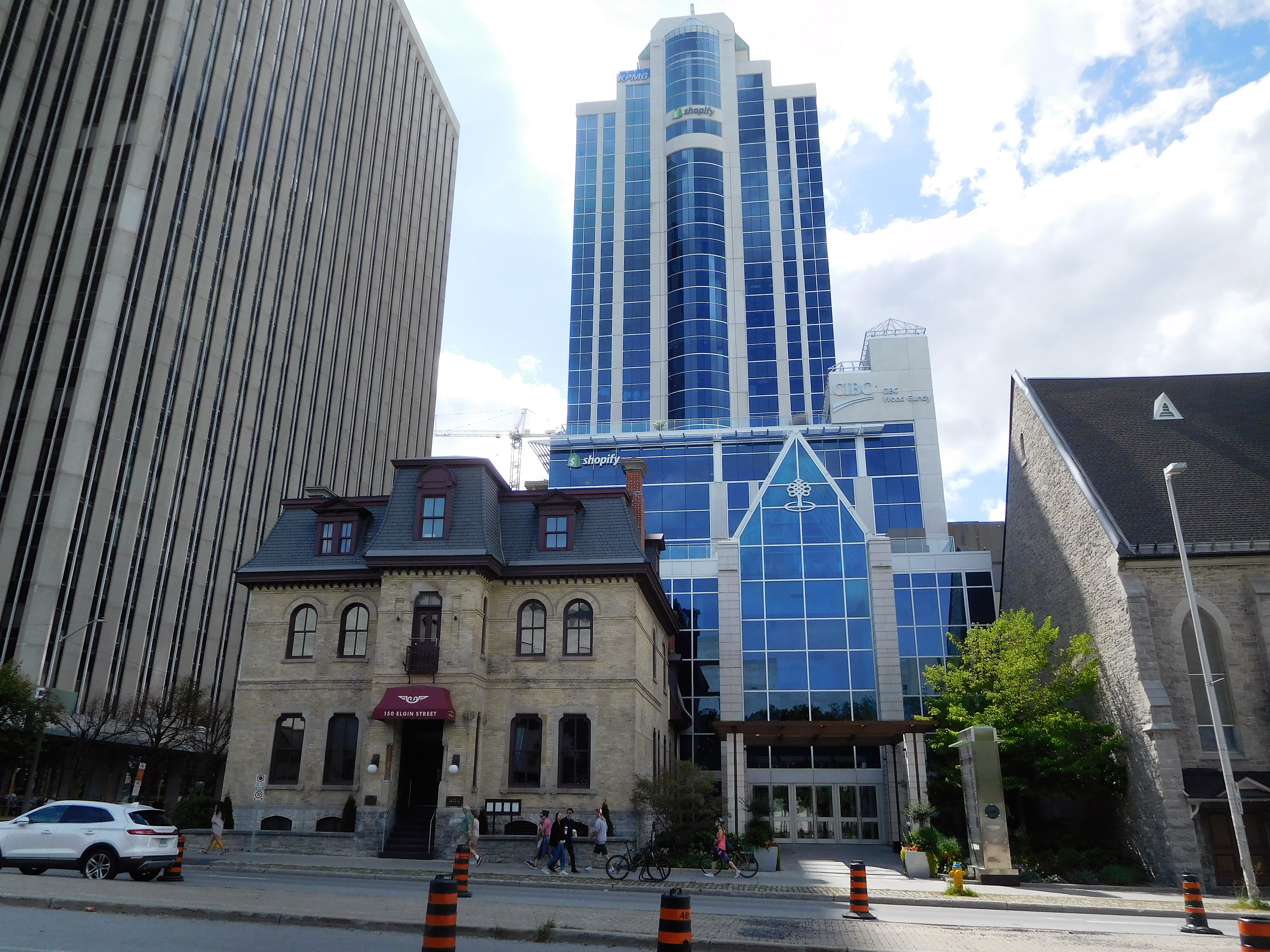
Building hosting the High Commission in Ottawa

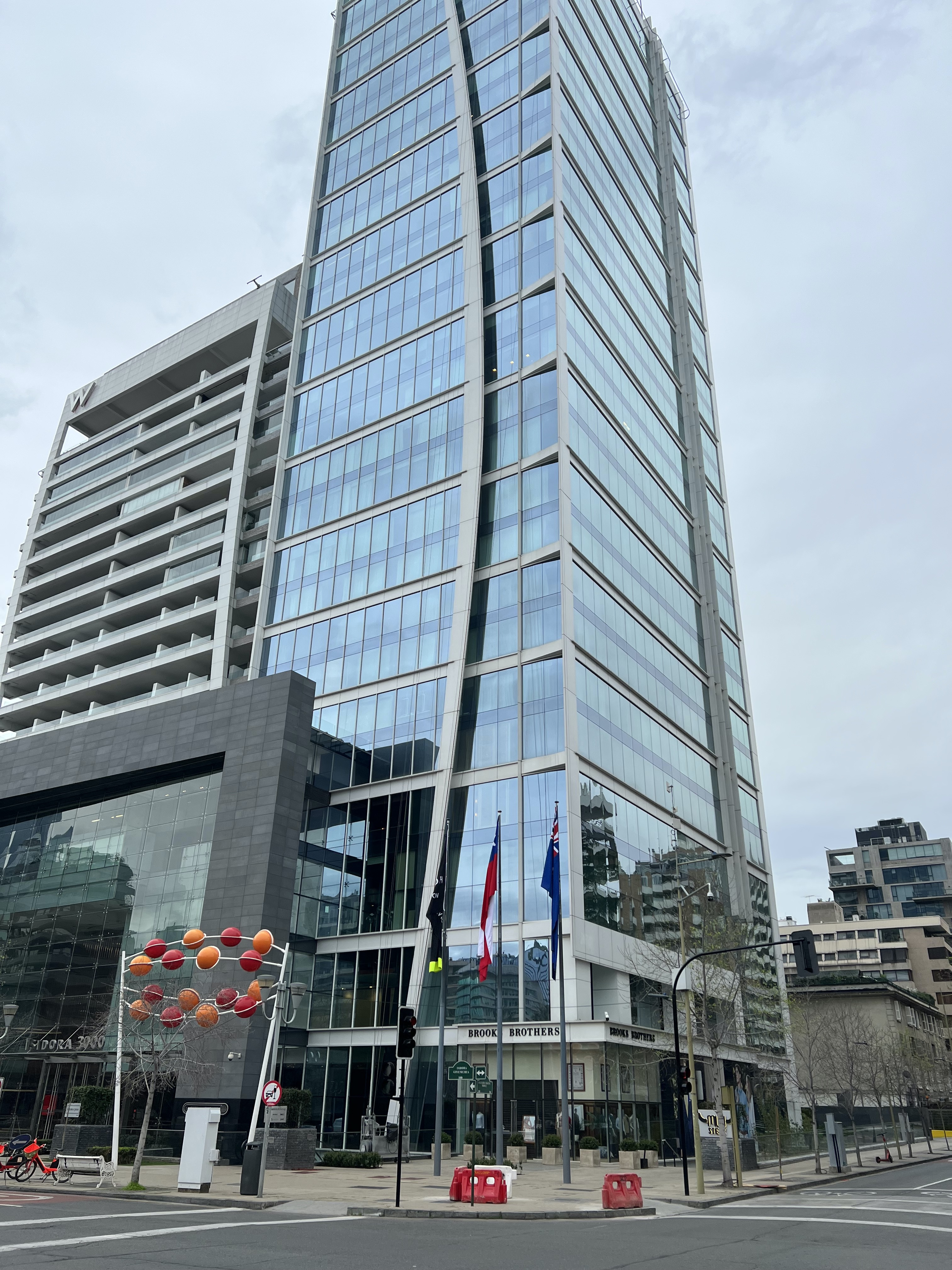
Building hosting the Embassy in Santiago

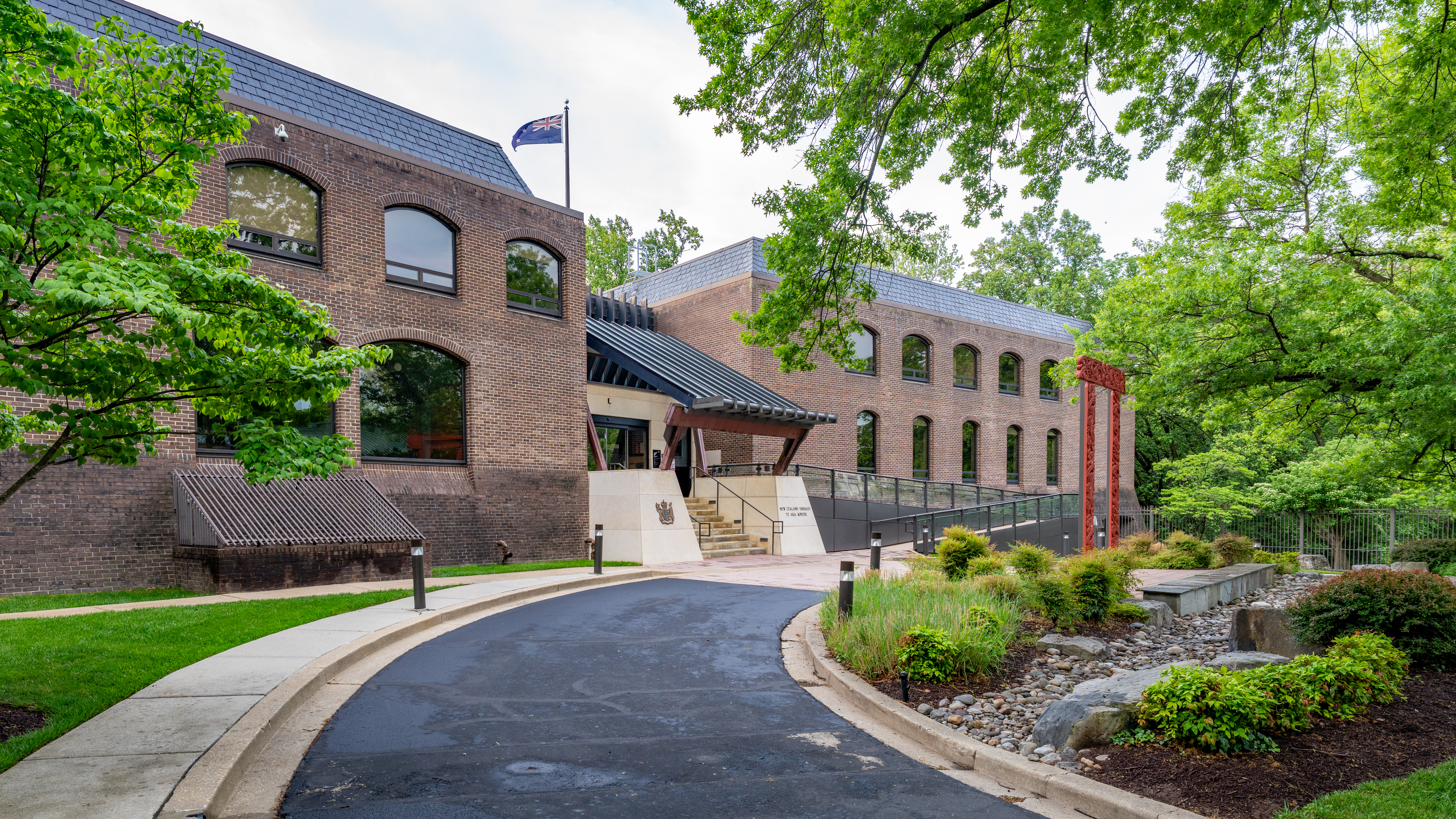
Embassy in Washington, D.C.

=== Asia ===
Host country	Host city	Mission	Year Opened	Concurrent accreditation	Ref.
China	Beijing	Embassy	1973	Countries: Mongolia	
China	Guangzhou	Consulate-General	2013	Countries: Mongolia	
China	Hong Kong	Consulate-General	1960	Countries: Mongolia	
China	Shanghai	Consulate-General	1992	Countries: Mongolia	
India	New Delhi	High Commission	1957 (Note: Closed between 1982 and 1985)	Countries: Nepal	
India	Mumbai	Consulate-General	2019	Countries: Nepal	
Indonesia	Jakarta	Embassy	1961		
Iran	Tehran	Embassy	1974	Countries: Afghanistan	
Japan	Tokyo	Embassy	1947		
Malaysia	Kuala Lumpur	High Commission	1959	Countries: Brunei	
Myanmar	Yangon	Embassy	2013		
Philippines	Manila	Embassy	1975		
Saudi Arabia	Riyadh	Embassy	1985	Countries: Bahrain; Kuwait; Oman; Yemen	
Singapore	Singapore	High Commission	1955		
South Korea	Seoul	Embassy	1971	Countries: North Korea	
Sri Lanka	Colombo	High Commission	2022	Countries: Bangladesh; Maldives; Pakistan	
Taiwan	Taipei	Commerce & Industry Office	1989		
Thailand	Bangkok	Embassy	1956	Countries: Cambodia; Laos	
Timor-Leste	Dili	Embassy	2000		
Turkey	Ankara	Embassy	1993	Countries: Azerbaijan; Israel; Jordan	
United Arab Emirates	Abu Dhabi	Embassy	2011	Countries: Iraq; Qatar	
United Arab Emirates	Dubai	Consulate-General	2007	Countries: Iraq; Qatar	
Vietnam	Hanoi	Embassy	1995		
Vietnam	Ho Chi Minh City	Consulate-General	1995		

Building hosting the Embassy in Manila

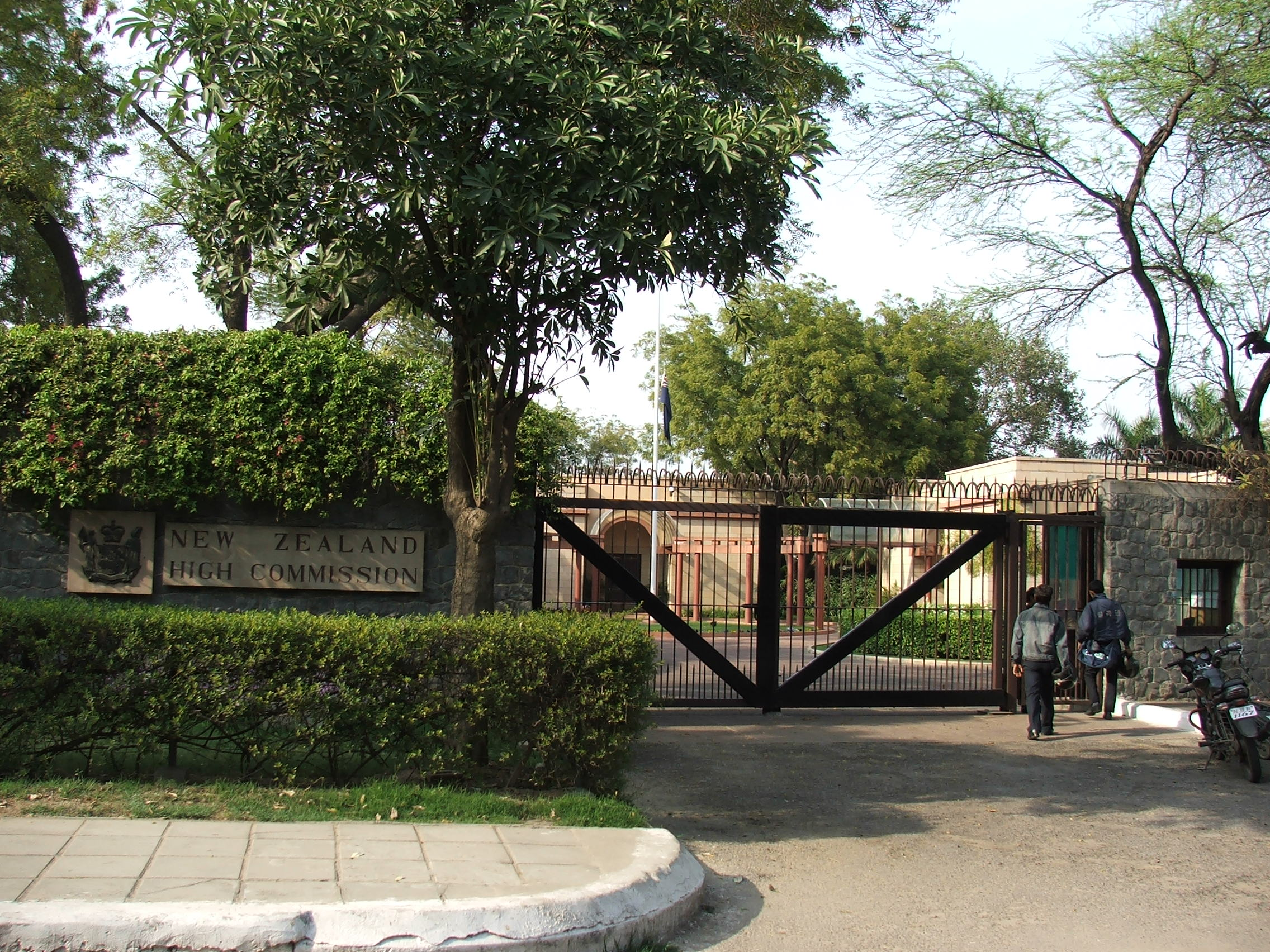
High Commission in New Delhi

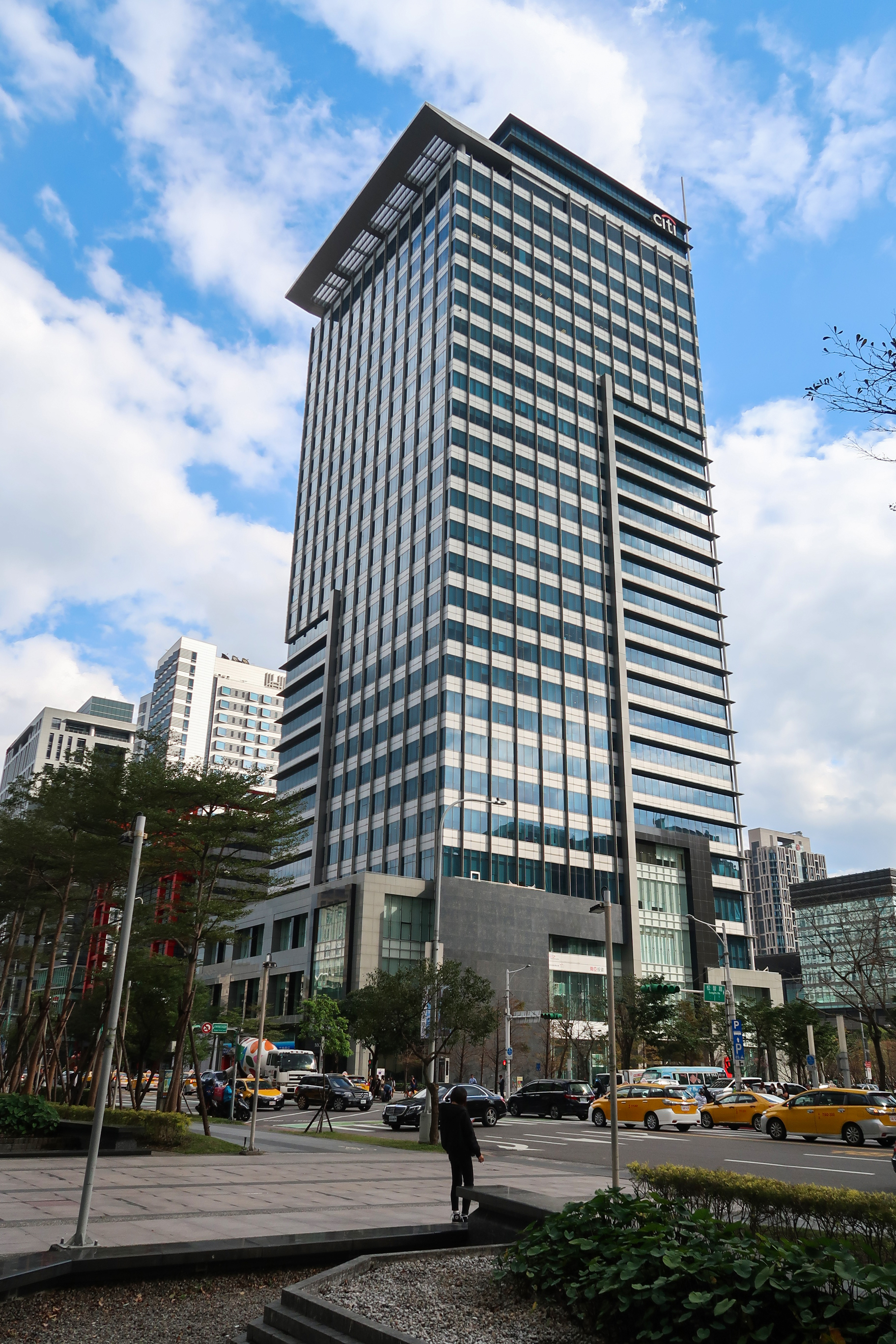
Building hosting the Commerce & Industry Office in Taipei

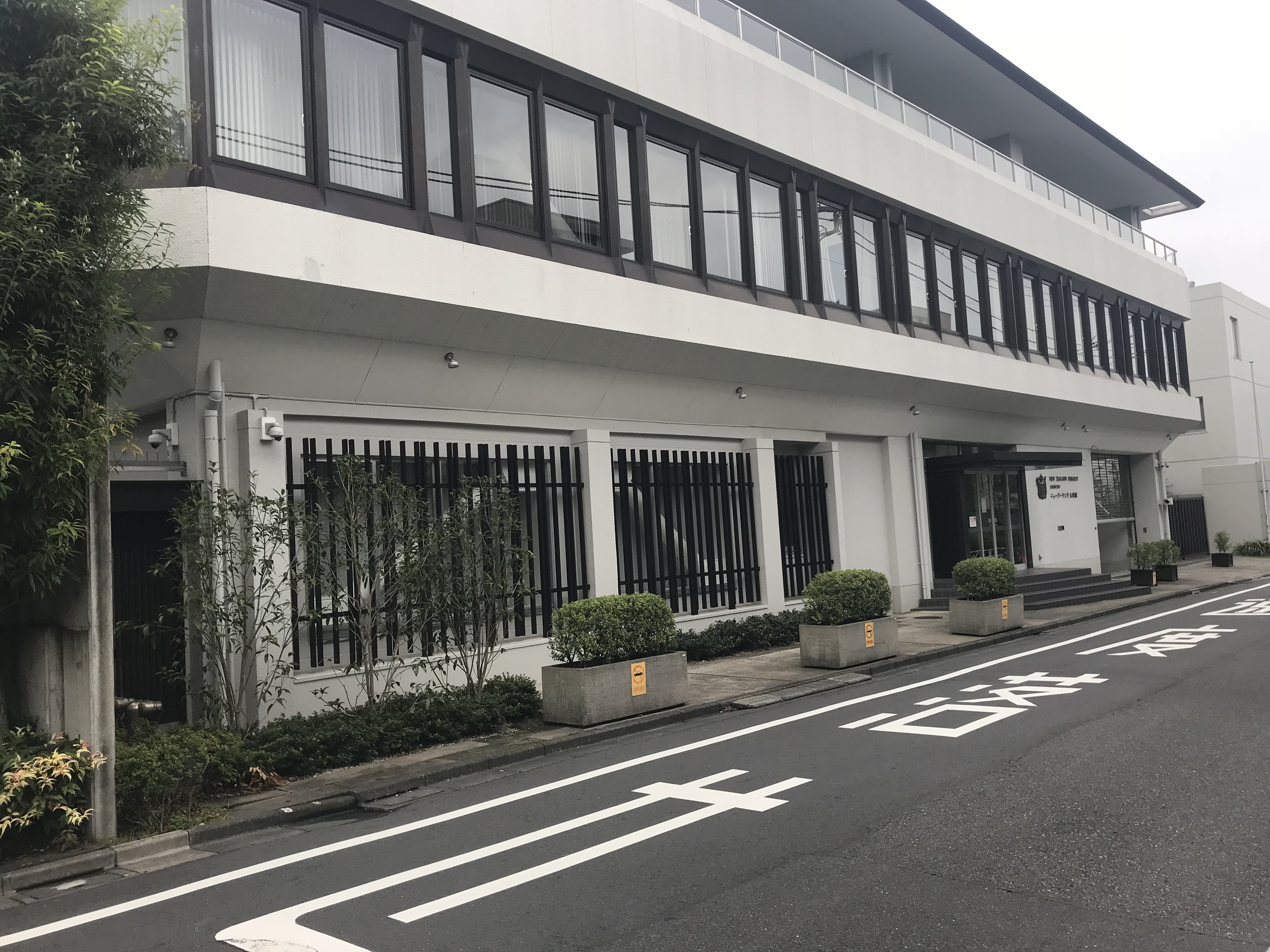
Embassy in Tokyo

=== Europe ===
Host country	Host city	Mission	Year Opened	Concurrent accreditation	Ref.
Austria	Vienna	Embassy	1973	Countries: Hungary; Slovenia; Slovakia; International Organizations: United Nations; International Atomic Energy Agency; UNODC	
Belgium	Brussels	Embassy	1967	Countries: Bulgaria; Luxembourg; Moldova; Romania	
France	Paris	Embassy	1949	Countries: Monaco; Portugal; Senegal; International Organizations: OECD; UNESCO	
France	Nouméa, New Caledonia	Consulate-General	1972	Countries: Monaco; Portugal; Senegal; International Organizations: OECD; UNESCO	
Germany	Berlin	Embassy	1966	Countries: Czechia; Liechtenstein; Switzerland	
Ireland	Dublin	Embassy	2018		
Italy	Rome	Embassy	1966	Countries: Albania; Bosnia and Herzegovina; Croatia; Cyprus; Greece; Montenegro; North Macedonia; San Marino; Serbia	
Italy	Milan	Consulate-General		Countries: Albania; Bosnia and Herzegovina; Croatia; Cyprus; Greece; Montenegro; North Macedonia; San Marino; Serbia	
Netherlands	The Hague	Embassy	1950	International Organizations: Organisation for the Prohibition of Chemical Weapons	
Poland	Warsaw	Embassy	2004	Countries: Estonia; Georgia; Latvia; Lithuania; Ukraine	
Russia	Moscow	Embassy	1944 (Note: Closed between 1950 and 1973)	Countries: Armenia; Belarus; Kazakhstan; Kyrgyzstan; Tajikistan; Turkmenistan; Uzbekistan	
Spain	Madrid	Embassy	1991	Countries: Andorra; Holy See; Malta; Morocco	
Sweden	Stockholm	Embassy	2008 (Note: Closed between 2012 and 2018)	Countries: Denmark; Finland; Iceland; Norway	
Switzerland	Geneva	Consulate-General	1961		
United Kingdom	London	High Commission	1871	International Organizations: Commonwealth of Nations	

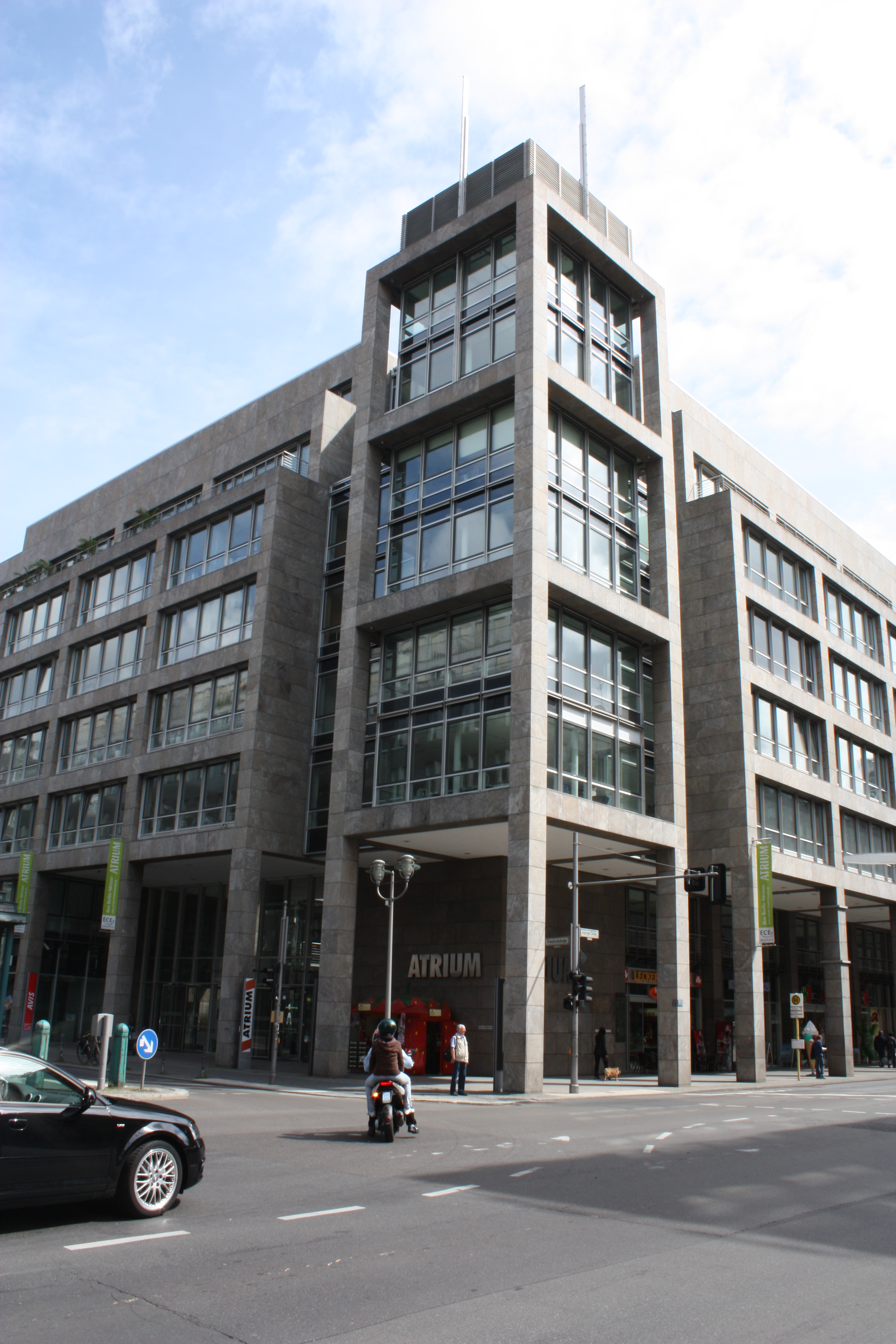
Building hosting the Embassy in Berlin

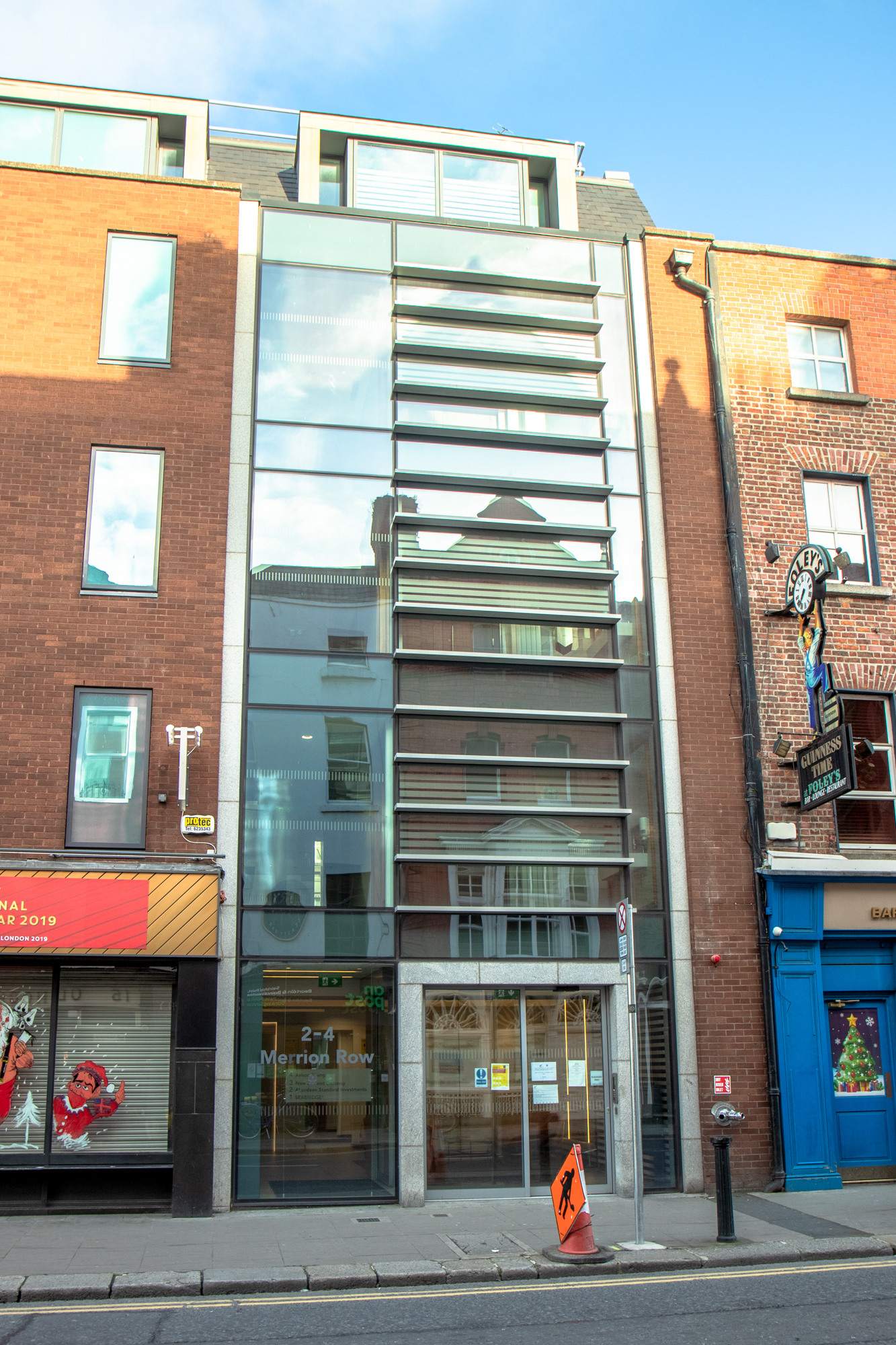
Embassy in Dublin

Consulate-General in Geneva

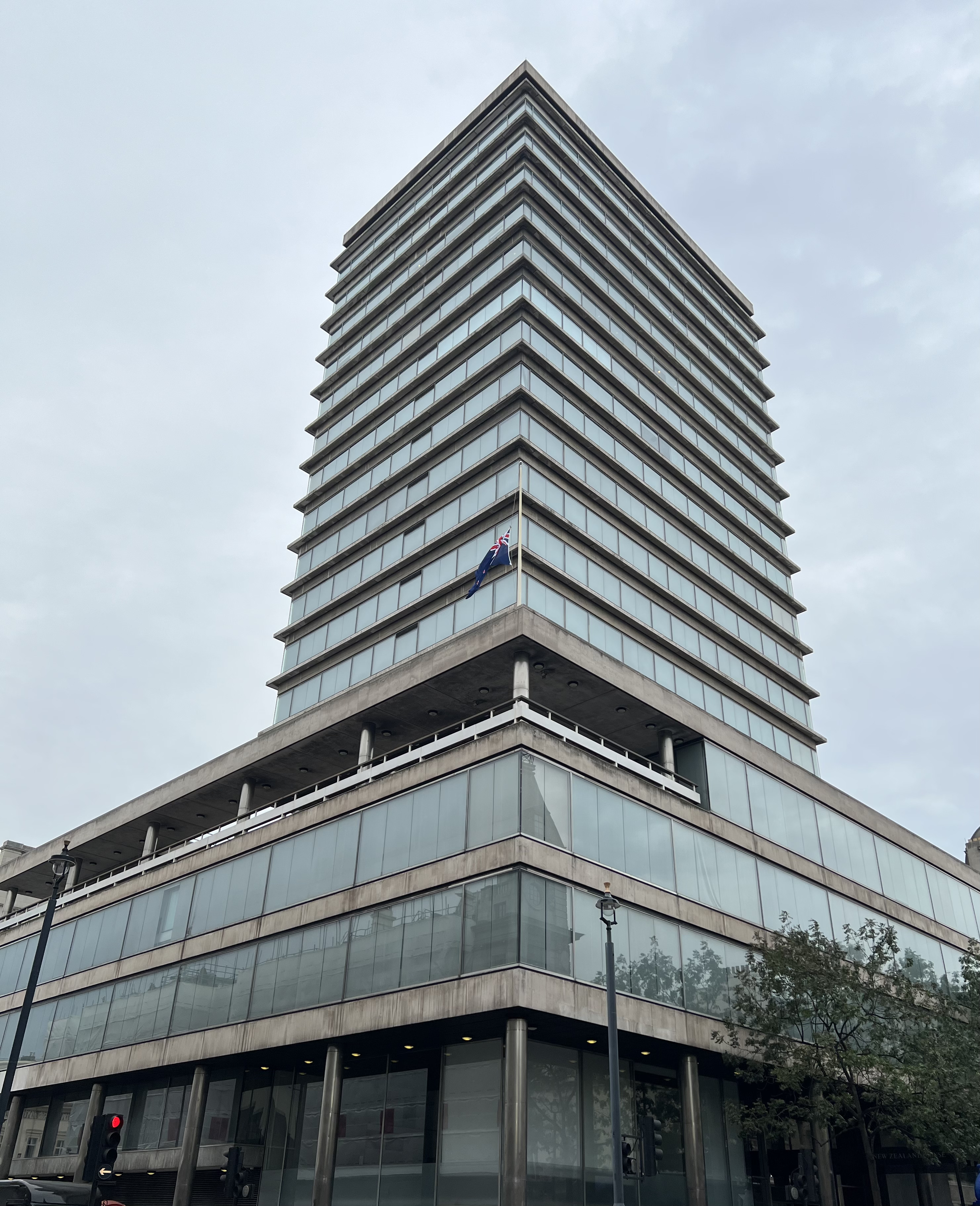
High Commission in London

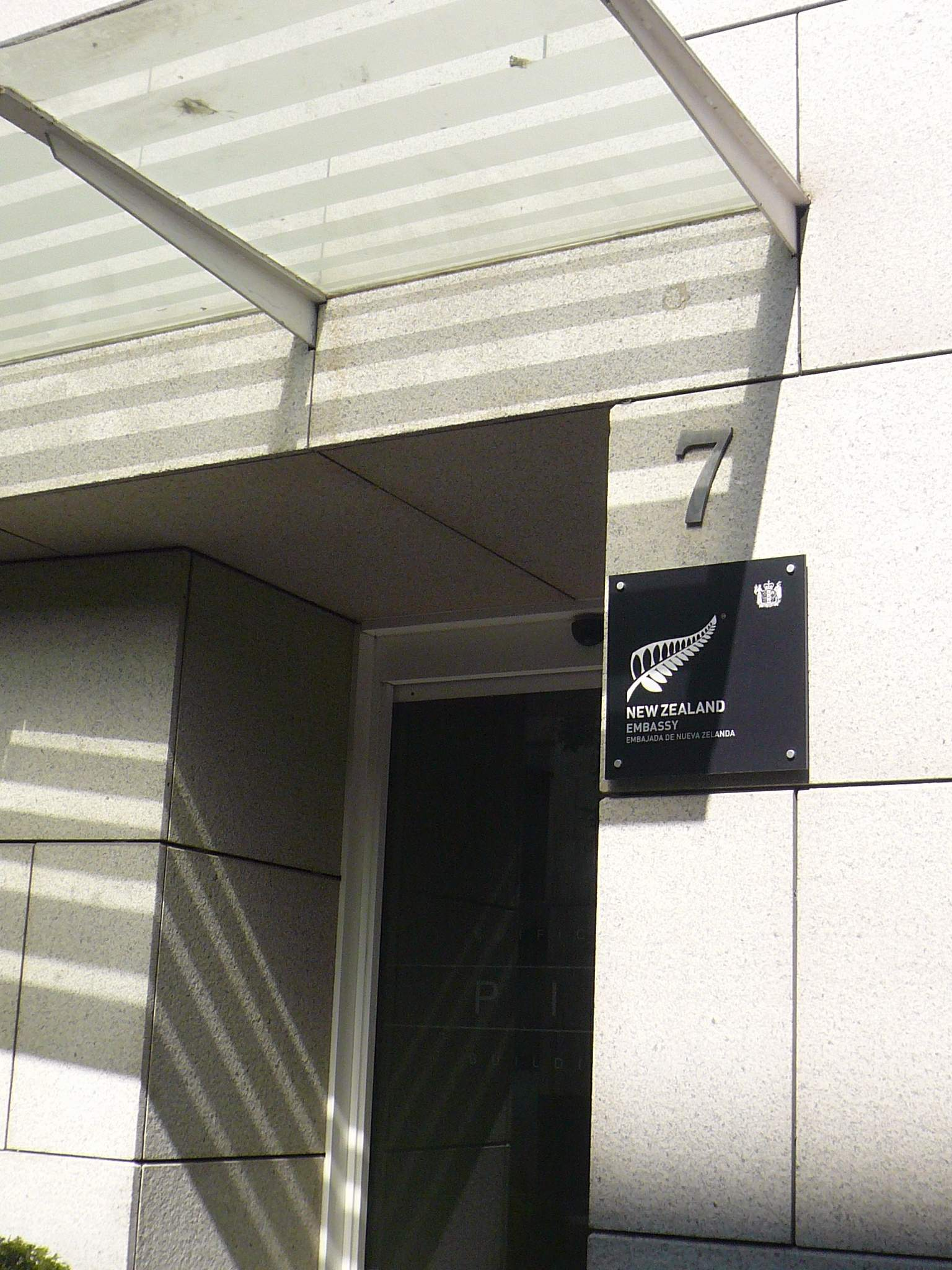
Embassy in Madrid

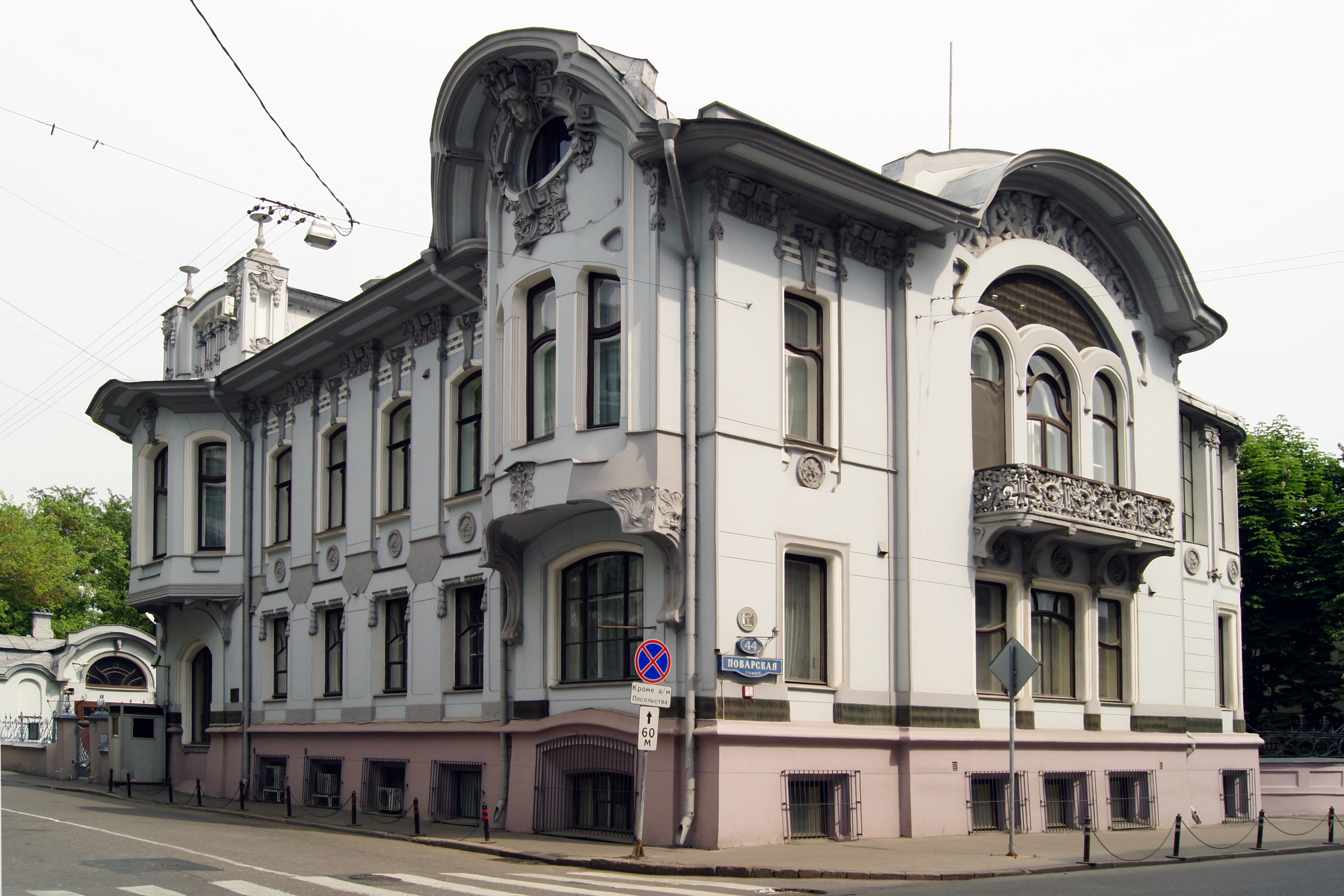
Embassy in Moscow

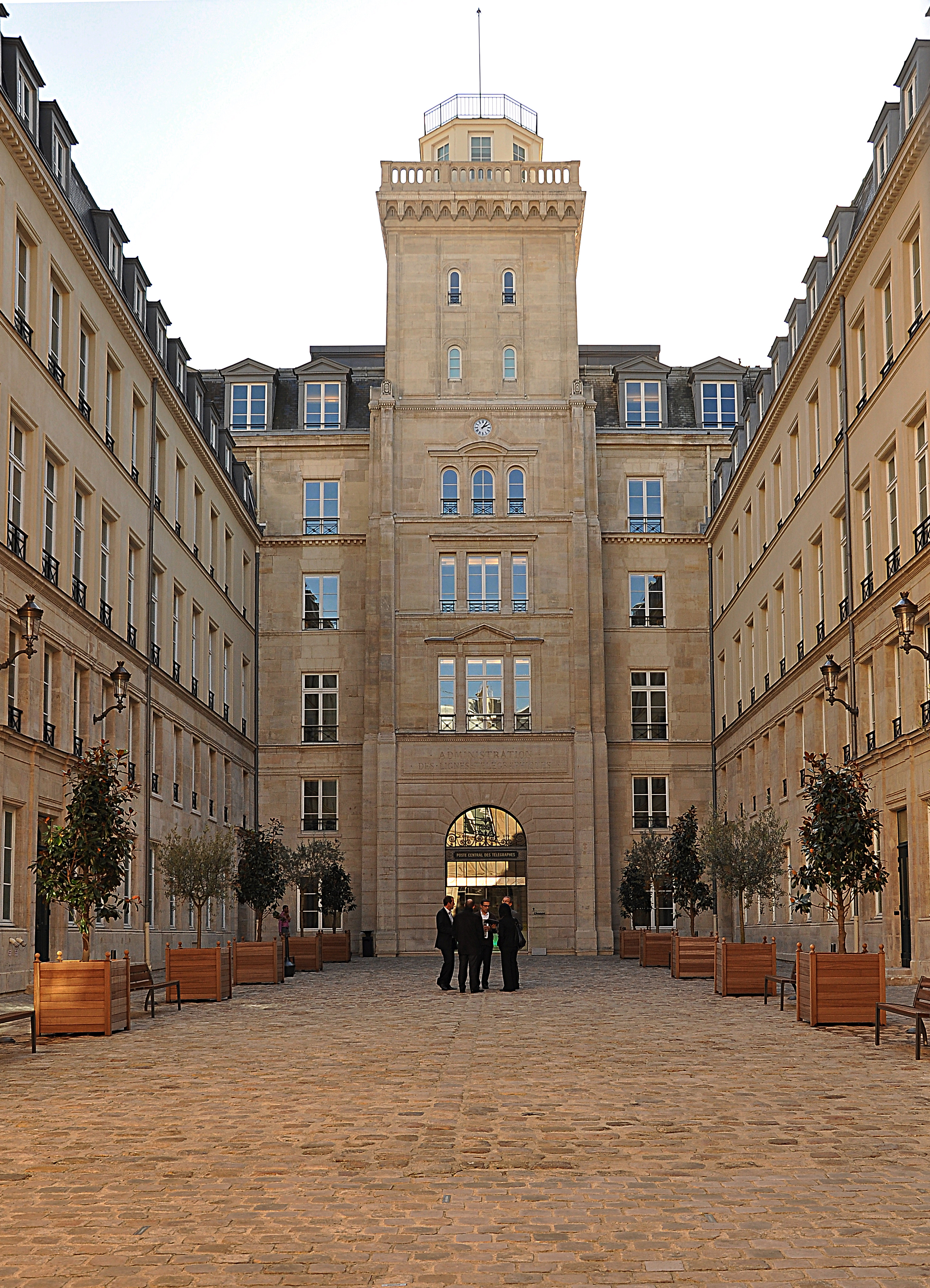
Embassy in Paris

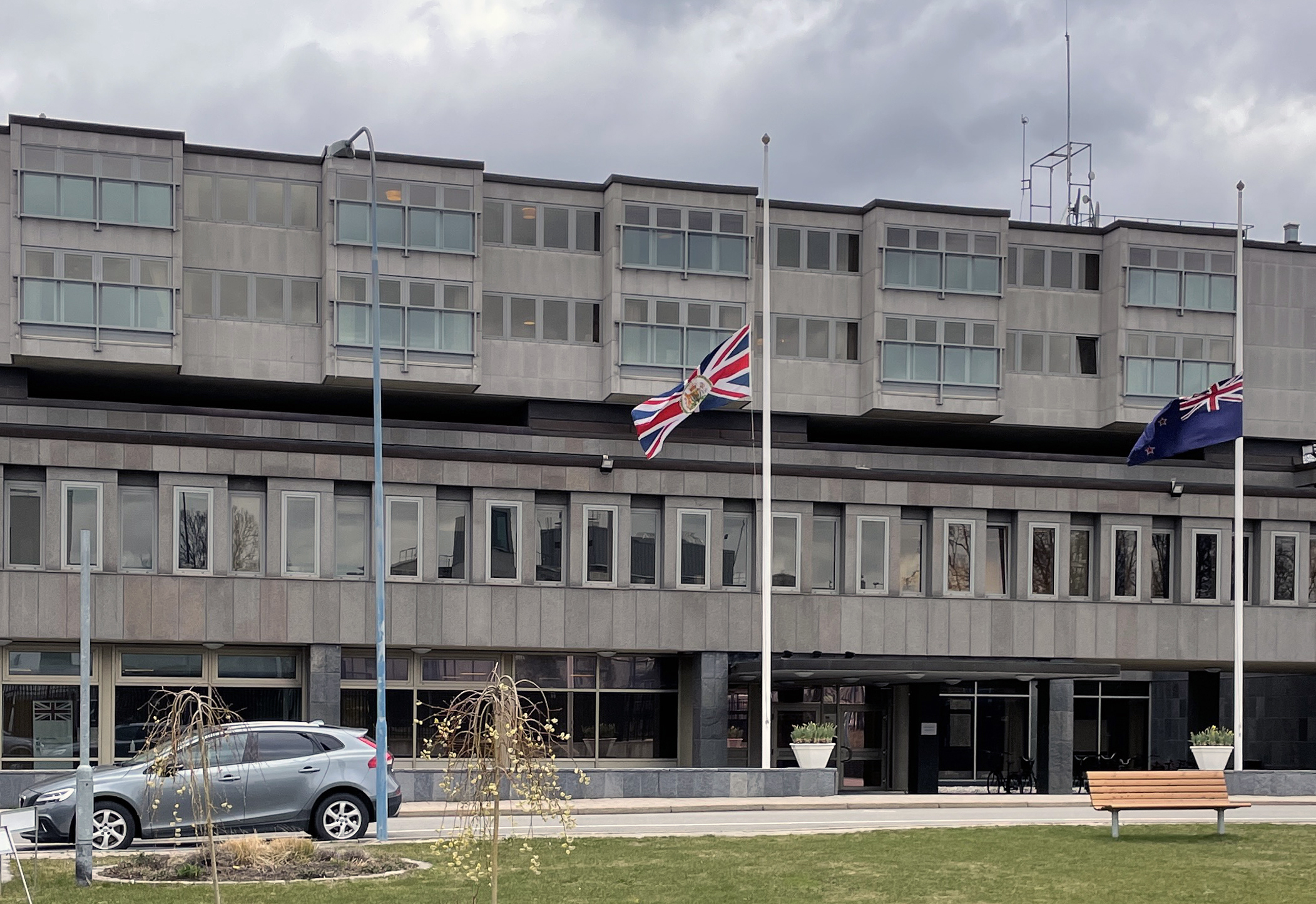
Embassy in Stockholm

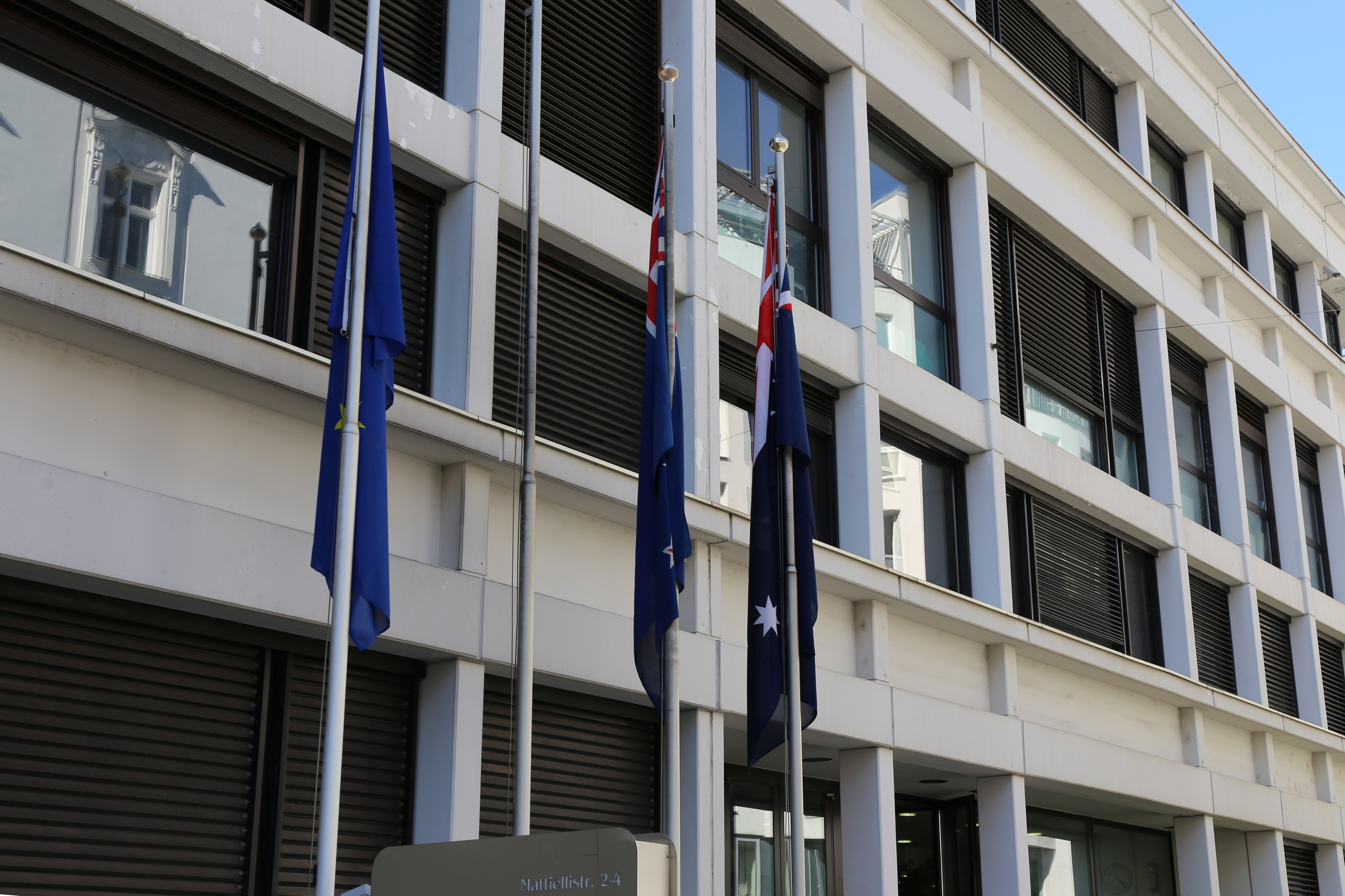
Embassy in Vienna

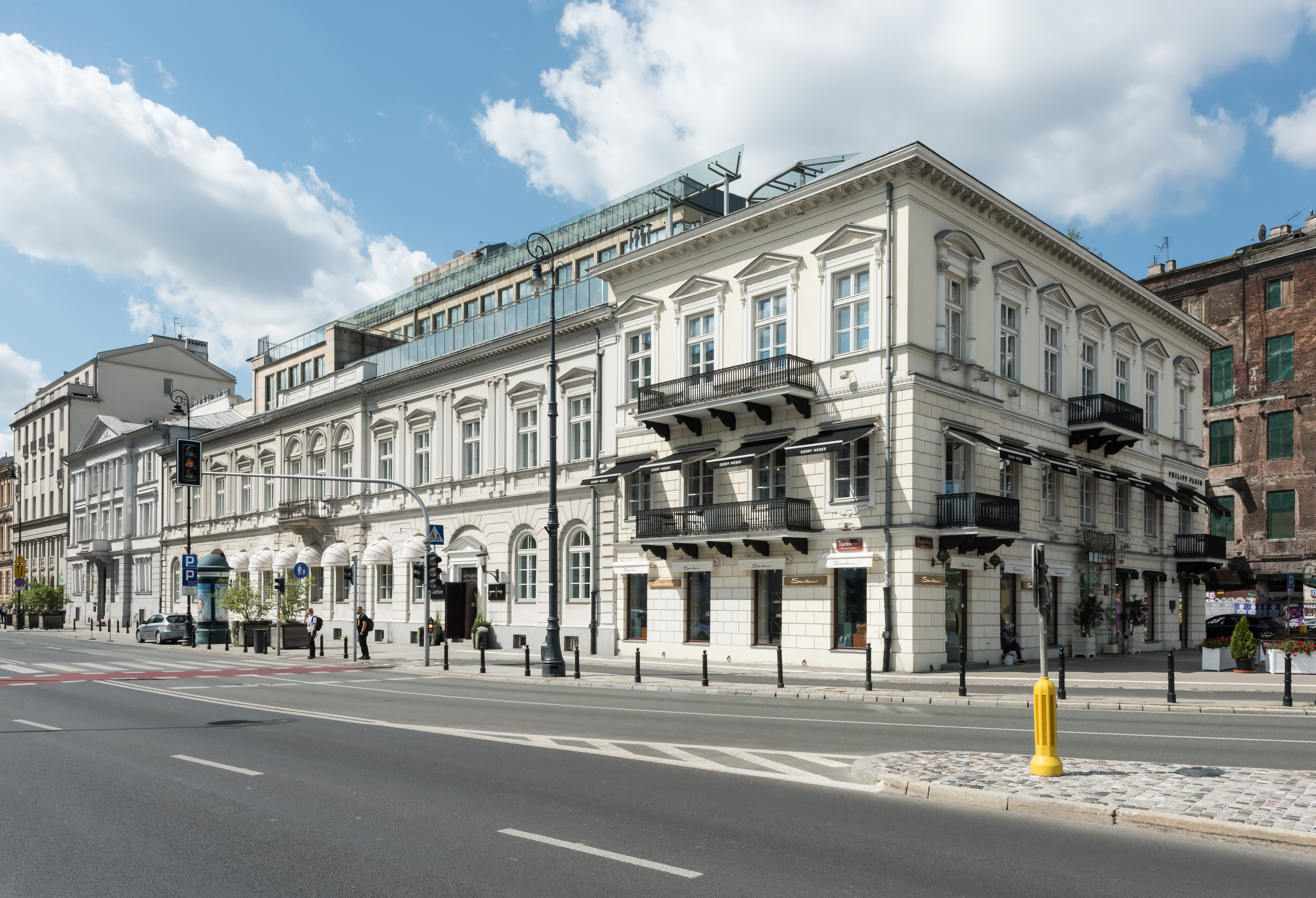
Building hosting the Embassy in Warsaw

=== Oceania ===
Host country	Host city	Mission	Year Opened	Concurrent accreditation	Ref.
Australia	Canberra	High Commission	1943		
Australia	Melbourne	Consulate-General	1905		
Australia	Sydney	Consulate-General	1905		
Fiji	Suva	High Commission	1970		
Cook Islands	Avarua	High Commission	1965		
Kiribati	Tarawa	High Commission	1989		
Niue	Alofi	High Commission	1974		
Papua New Guinea	Port Moresby	High Commission	1974		
Samoa	Apia	High Commission	1962		
Solomon Islands	Honiara	High Commission	1978		
Tonga	Nukuʻalofa	High Commission	1977		
Vanuatu	Port Vila	High Commission	1987		

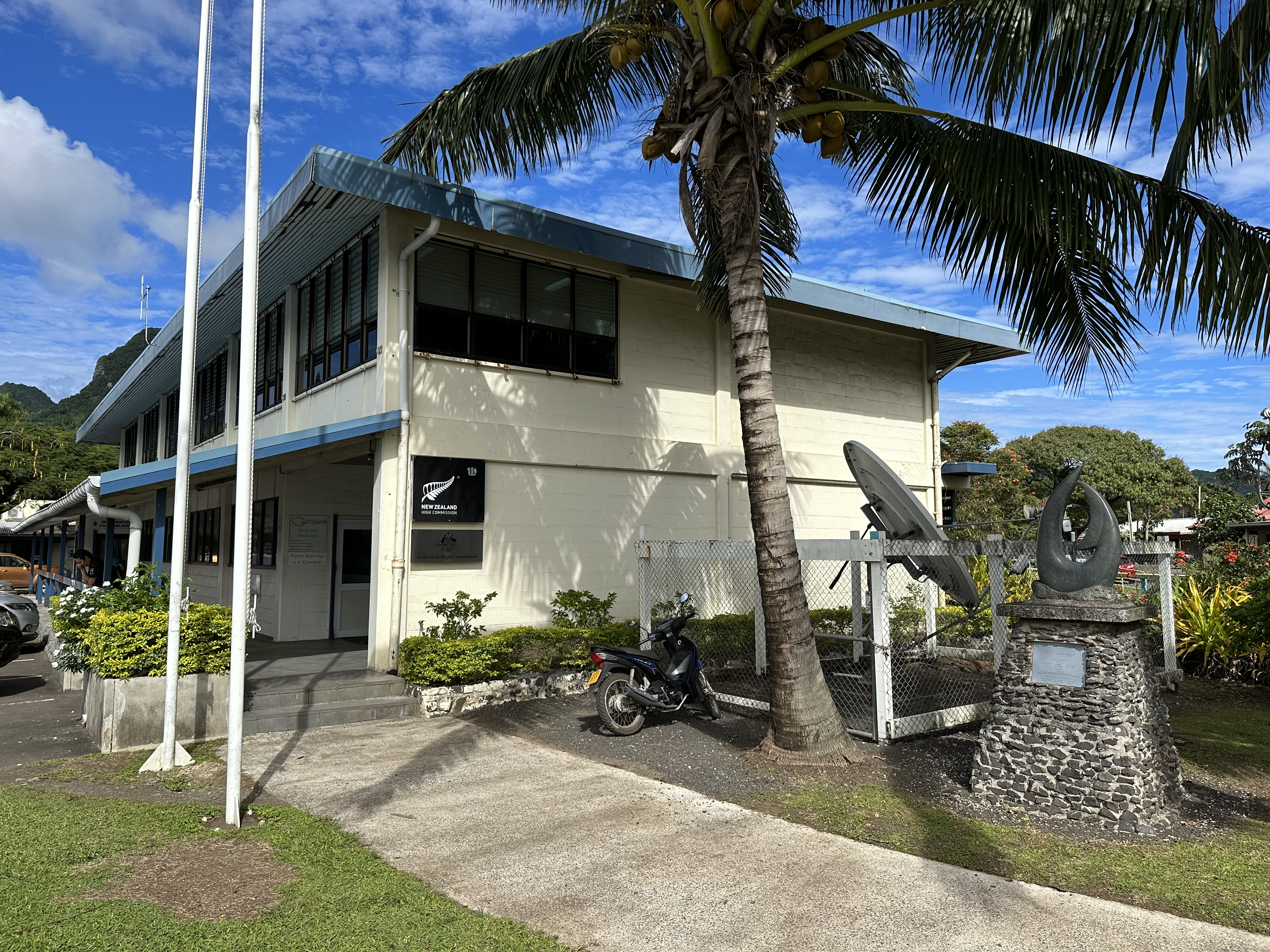
High Commission in Avarua

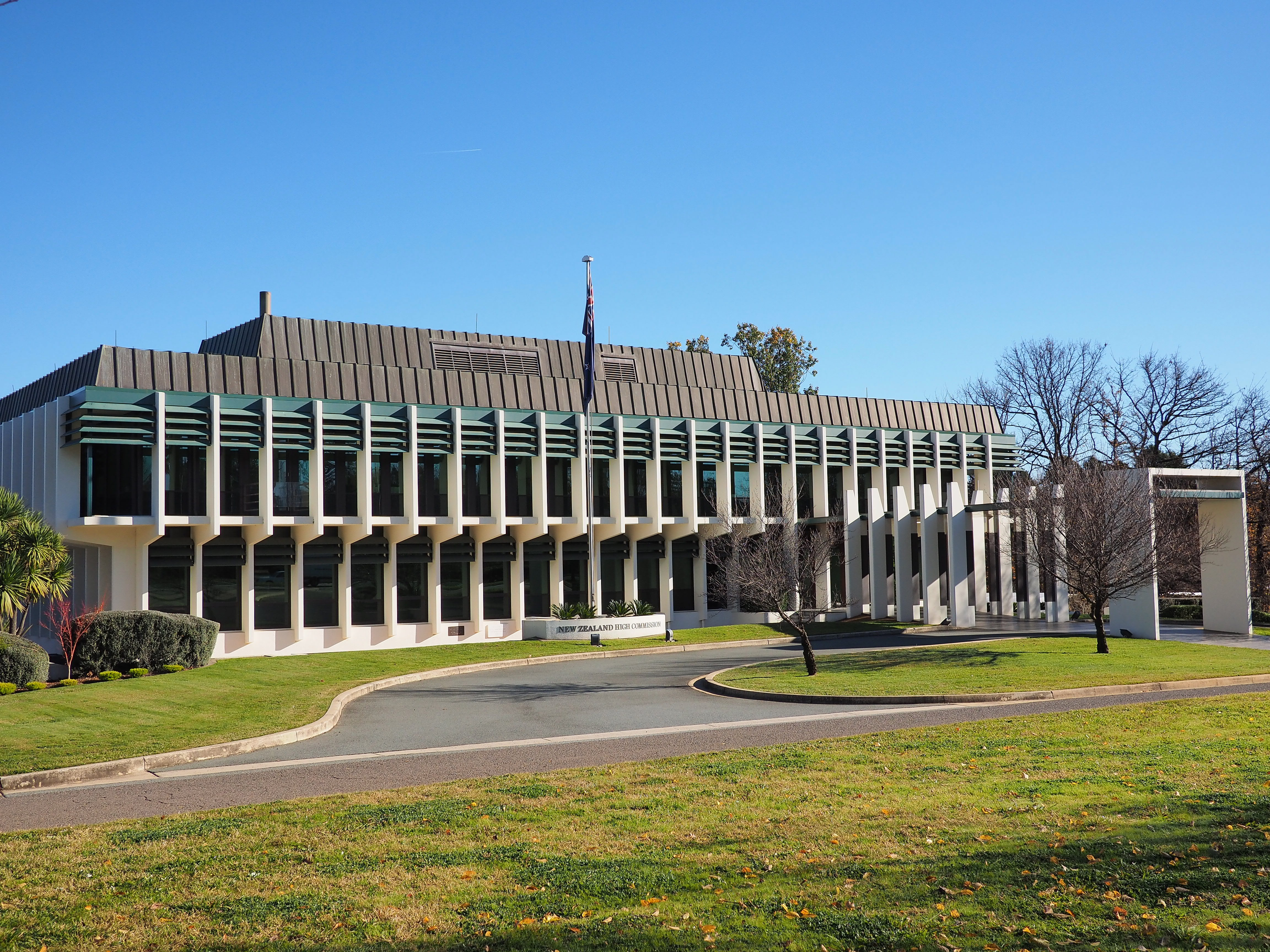
High Commission in Canberra

High Commission in Nukuʻalofa

=== Multilateral organisations ===
Organization	Host City	Host country	Mission	Year Opened	Concurrent accreditation	Ref.
Association of Southeast Asian Nations	Jakarta	Indonesia	Mission	2015		
European Union	Brussels	Belgium	Permanent Mission	1967	International Organizations: NATO	
United Nations	New York City	United States	Permanent Mission	1955		
United Nations	Geneva	Switzerland	Permanent Mission	1961	International Organizations: Conference on Disarmament	
World Trade Organization	Geneva	Switzerland	Permanent Mission	1961		

Permanent mission to the United Nations in Geneva

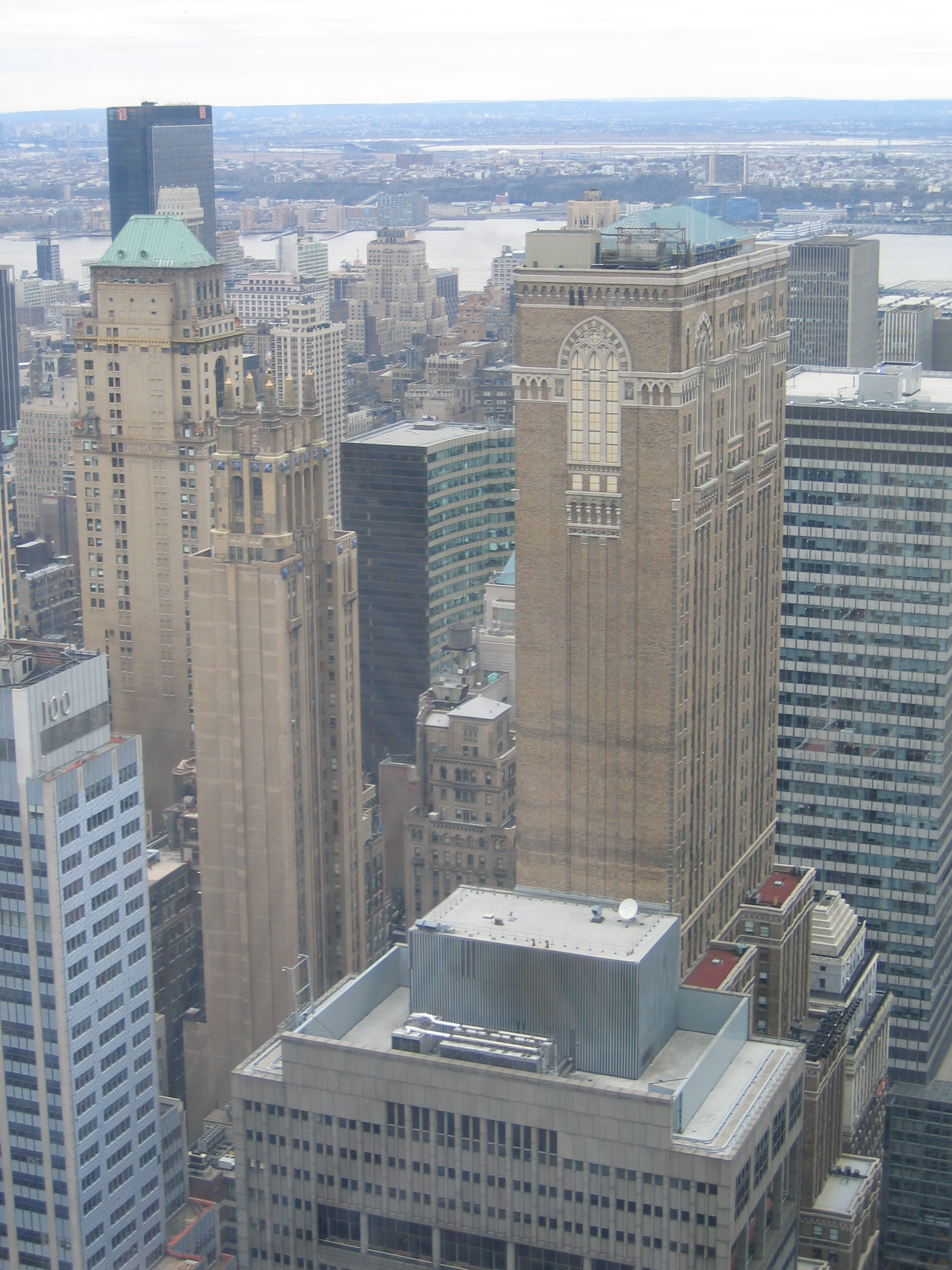
Building hosting the Permanent Mission to the United Nations in New York City

== Closed missions ==
=== Africa ===
Host country	Host city	Mission	Year closed	Ref.
Zimbabwe	Harare	Embassy (Note: Resident in Pretoria, Gauteng, South Africa)	1998	

=== Americas ===
Host country	Host city	Mission	Year closed	Ref.
Peru	Lima	Embassy (Note: Resident in Santiago, Chile)	1990	
Canada	Toronto	Consulate-General	1982	

=== Asia ===
Host country	Host city	Mission	Year closed	Ref.
Afghanistan	Kabul	Embassy (Note: Resident in Tehran, Iran)	2014	
Bahrain	Manama	Embassy (Note: Resident in Riyadh, Saudi Arabia)	1991	
Iraq	Baghdad	Embassy (Note: Resident in Abu Dhabi, United Arab Emirates)	2020	
Japan	Osaka	Consulate-General	1999	
South Vietnam	Saigon	Embassy (Note: The South Vietnamese embassy was closed upon the fall of Saigon in April 1975, thus marking the end of the Vietnam War and the start of a transition period to the formal reunification of Vietnam.) (Note: Now continues as a consulate-general in Ho Chi Minh City, Vietnam)	1975	

=== Europe ===
Host country	Host city	Mission	Year closed	Ref.
Greece	Athens	Embassy (Note: Resident in Rome, Lazio, Italy)	1991	

=== Oceania ===
Host country	Host city	Mission	Year closed	Ref.
Australia	Adelaide	Consulate-General	1990	
Australia	Brisbane	Consulate-General	2010	
Australia	Perth	Consulate-General	1990	

== See also ==
- Foreign relations of New Zealand
- List of diplomatic missions in New Zealand
- Visa policy of New Zealand
- Visa requirements for New Zealand citizens
