= Bronwen Holdsworth =

New Zealand businesswoman and arts patron

Dame Bronwen Holdsworth DNZM
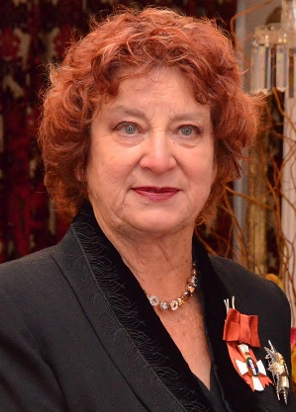
- Holdsworth in 2015
- Born: Bronwen Scott Pearson; 13 September 1942 (age 84); Wellington, New Zealand
- Education: Victoria University of Wellington
- Occupation: Company director
- Years active: 1983–present
- Spouse: Peter Holdsworth (m. 1970)
- Children: 4
- Relatives: Samantha Holdsworth (daughter)

Dame Bronwen Scott Holdsworth DNZM (née Pearson; born 13 September 1942) is a New Zealand businesswoman and arts patron from Gisborne, New Zealand.

== Private life ==
Bronwen Scott Pearson was born in Wellington, New Zealand, in 1942. She received her secondary education at Samuel Marsden Collegiate School.

Her parents, Tom and Ngara Pearson, moved to Gisborne in 1960 where her father was the vicar of the Holy Trinity parish. She remained in Wellington to study English, music, politics and philosophy at Victoria University of Wellington.

She continued her association with Gisborne even after her parents had moved on and in 1966, she met local farmer and engineer Peter Holdsworth just before she was posted to Malaysia with the New Zealand Ministry of Foreign Affairs diplomatic service. She returned to New Zealand in 1969 and Peter Holdsworth and Bronwen Pearson married in 1970. Since their marriage, they have lived in Te Karaka near Gisborne, initially running the Holdsworth family farm. They have four children, Dr Katharine Holdsworth, Jasper Holdsworth, Dr Samantha Holdsworth, and Zak Holdsworth, all of whom have studied engineering before branching out into other disciplines/entrepreneurial businesses. Bronwen is a keen musician and accomplished pianist.

== Business interests ==
Bronwen and Peter Holdsworth founded Pultron Composites Ltd in 1983. An industrial technology company, Pultron is the largest manufacturer of GFRP pultrusions in Australasia, with manufacturing facilities in NZ and Dubai, and Bronwen was its managing director until 2007. Jasper Holdsworth, one of their sons, is now CEO of Pultron, and they established a manufacturing plant in the Jebel Ali Free Zone in 2010.

Pultron is a leader in the research, development and manufacturing of high-performance glass fiber-reinforced polymer (GFRP) pultrusions. Pultron concentrates on innovation and R&D, and has developed more than 45 new specialist GFRP structural products for marine, mining, infrastructure, electrical, agriculture and recreation applications – including Mateenbar™, Pultron’s proprietary composite rebar. (http://www.mateenbar.com)

As of 2015, Dame Bronwen is finance director and chairman of the Holdsworth Group, which includes interests in farming, forestry, property, investment, and manufacturing under the banner of Pultron Composites. Dr Peter Holdsworth F.IPENZ, Pultron's technical director, was awarded an honorary doctorate from his alma mater, Canterbury University, for his technical entrepreneurship and achievements.

Over the years Dame Bronwen has been involved in a number of business related organisations including the East Coast Business Development Board (1989–95); a Ministerial Task Force on International Competitiveness (1989); the steering committee for the APEC Women Leaders Conference (1999); the Prime Minister’s Enterprise Council (1995–97); and from 1997–2002, a member of the Foundation for Research, Science and Technology's advisory committee. She was also on the Board of TVNZ Ltd (1994–97).

== Community involvement ==
Holdsworth has numerous community interests, many of them related to the arts and education. She was on the boards the Tairawhiti Polytechnic; Tairawhiti Museum; the Gisborne Opera Festival; and was establishing chairman of First Light Tourism, which organised the tourism promotion around the fact that Gisborne was the first city to see the sun in the year 2000. She is a member of Te Ha 1769 Sestercentennial Trust, which is organising celebrations for the 250th anniversary of Captain Cook's first arrival in New Zealand. She is a trustee of the Gisborne War Memorial Theatre.

Holdsworth is a founding sponsor and trustee of the Gisborne International Music Competition, and she is a board member of the Gisborne Opera Festival. She is also a trustee of the Sunrise Foundation, and of the Mātai Medical Imaging Research Institute.

In July 2014, Holdsworth was re-appointed to the board of the New Zealand Symphony Orchestra, having originally been on the NZSO Board between 1996 and 2000.

== Honours and awards ==
In 1988, Holdsworth was chosen as Businesswoman of the Year in a competition sponsored by the New Zealand women's magazine More. She was awarded the 1990 Commemoration Medal. In the 1997 New Year Honours, she was appointed an Officer of the New Zealand Order of Merit, for services to business, art and the community. When Marsden School introduced its Hall of Fame in 2007, Holdsworth was the inaugural laureate. In the 2015 Queen's Birthday Honours, she was appointed a Dame Companion of the New Zealand Order of Merit, for services to business and the arts. In 2019, she was inducted into the New Zealand Hall of Fame for Women Entrepreneurs.
