= Taipei Economic and Cultural Office, Wellington =

De facto embassy of the Republic of China

Taipei Economic and Cultural Office in New Zealand
- 駐紐西蘭台北經濟文化辦事處
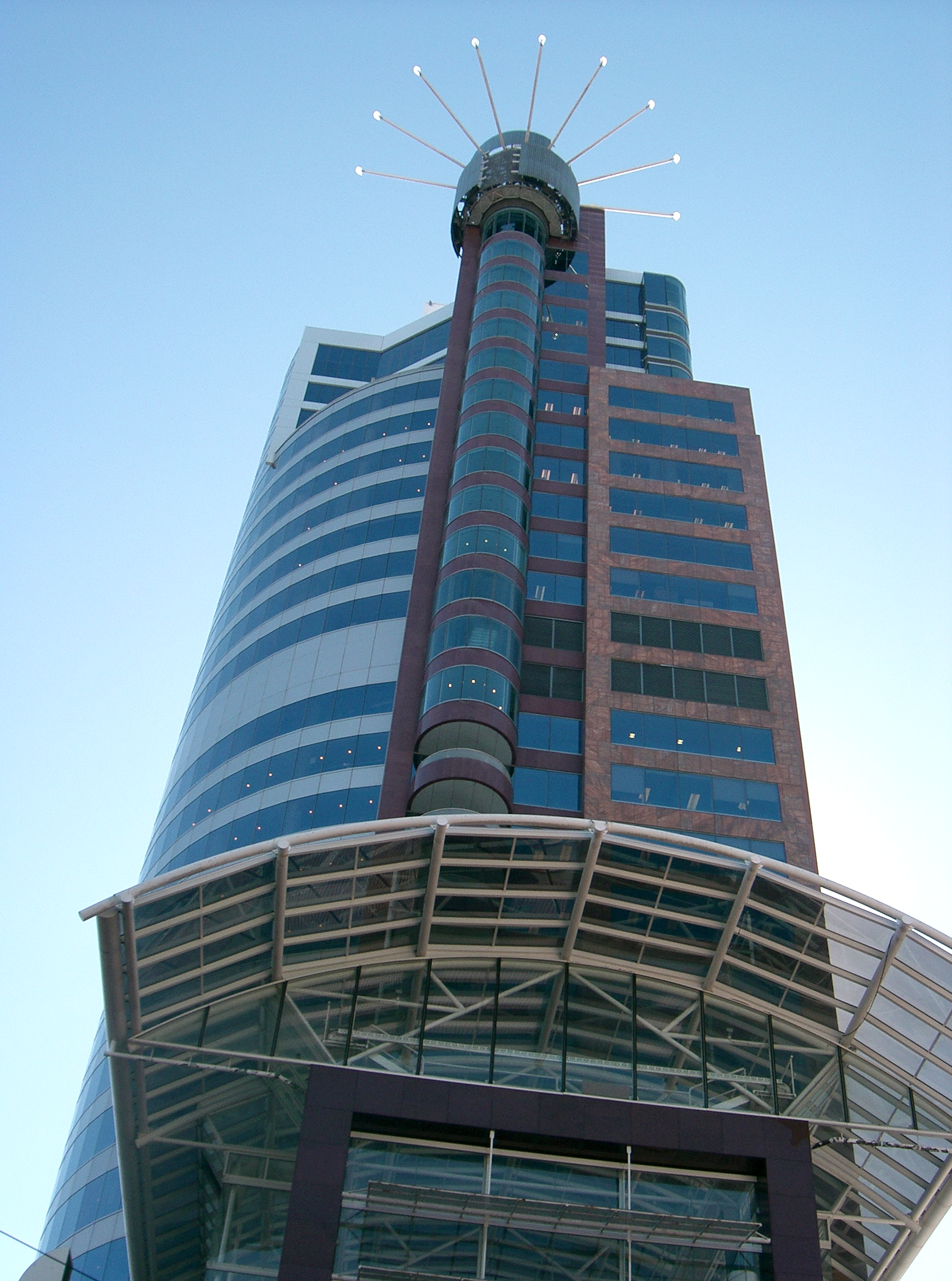

Agency overview
- Formed: 1973 (as East Asian Trade Center); 1991 (as Taipei Economic and Cultural Office)
- Jurisdiction: New Zealand; Cook Islands; Niue; Nauru
- Headquarters: Wellington
- Agency executive: Amb. Joanne Ou, Representative
- Website: Taipei Economic and Cultural Office in New Zealand

The Taipei Economic and Cultural Office in New Zealand (Chinese: 駐紐西蘭台北經濟文化辦事處) represents interests of Taiwan in New Zealand in the absence of formal diplomatic relations, functioning as a de facto embassy.

== History ==
The office was established in Auckland in 1973 as the East Asian Trade Center. Before 1972, New Zealand recognized Taiwan as the "Republic of China". However, diplomatic relations were ended following the decision of the government of Norman Kirk to recognize the People's Republic of China. It adopted its present name in 1991.

== Functions and location ==
The Office is headed by a Representative, currently Amb. Joanne Ou.

Its head office is in Wellington, and there is also a branch office in Auckland.

It is counterpart in Taiwan is the New Zealand Commerce and Industry Office in Taipei.

== Representatives ==
- Amb. Joanne Ou(2023–Now) (Curriculum Vitae)
- Joseph Shih (2002–2006)

== See also ==
- List of diplomatic missions of Taiwan
- List of diplomatic missions in New Zealand
- New Zealand–Taiwan relations
