= William Holdsworth (disambiguation) =

William Holdsworth (1871–1944) was a legal historian.

William Holdsworth may also refer to:

- Bill Holdsworth (William Edgar Newman Holdsworth, 1928–2016), English first-class cricketer
- William Holdsworth (politician) (1875–1937), English-born Australian politician

== See also ==
- Holdsworth (surname)
