= Dan Holdsworth =

British photographer (born 1974)

- Born: 1974 (age 51–52); Welwyn Garden City, Hertfordshire, England
- Education: London College of Communication (BA)
- Occupation: Photographer
- Website: holdsworth.works

Dan Holdsworth (born in 1974 in Welwyn Garden City, England) is a British photographer who creates large-scale photographs and digital art characterized by the use of traditional techniques and unusually long exposure times, and by radical abstractions of geography. He has exhibited internationally including solo shows at BALTIC Centre for Contemporary Art, Gateshead, and Barbican Art Gallery, London; and group shows at Tate Britain, London, and Centre Pompidou, Paris. His work is held in collections including the Tate Collection, Saatchi Collection, and the Victoria and Albert Museum, London. He lives and works in Newcastle upon Tyne and London.

== Education ==
Holdsworth studied photography and earned a BA (hons) in photography at the London College of Communication, University of the Arts London, UK.

== Early work ==
Holdsworth gained notice with photographic series such as A Machine For Living (1999) and Megalith (2002), where familiar scenes of service stations, car parks, billboards, or broadcast towers loom as godforsaken outposts, antecedent inklings of a new apocalyptic frontier. Consumed by the exaggerated glow of neon and head lamps, the landscapes' toxic-colour intensity and blurred movements suggest atomic fulguration, illuminating industrial structures like shrines. Holdsworth often uses extremely prolonged exposures to capture the ethereal essence of his scenes; the paradox of these images is that their hyper-acceleration is in fact slow-time aggregation: the lens' observations over minutes, hours, days, record an unnoticed seething of energy, a plausible force of infernal propulsion.

In the mid-2000s, Holdsworth began to source his otherworldly scenes from the truly exotic: science fiction possibilities evoked at the ends of the earth, from Europe to North and South America. Key examples from this period are The Gregorian (2005), and Hyperborea (2006) series, which were respectively shot in Puerto Rico at the American National Astronomy and Ionosphere Centre, and in Iceland's interior, the film location of Jules Verne's Journey to the Center of the Earth. Whether picturing a research centre in the guise of a UFO set deep within the jungle, or barren glaciers and mountains diminished beneath the spectacle of northern lights, these images re-imagine the far corners of the earth as a virtual world, fusing primordial wilderness and space-age science.

== Blackout ==
The series Blackout (2010) was inspired by the infamous power failures in 1960s New York, an event which threw millions of people into darkness and prompted a panicky fear of nuclear attack. Holdsworth's enormous prints are images of mountains and glaciers in Iceland, made mystic and otherworldly through innovations in photographic art.

Blackout was first exhibited at Patricia Low Contemporary, Geneva, in 2010. This exhibition included the works "Blackout 08", "Blackout 13", "Blackout 09", and "Blackout 07".

In 2011, Holdsworth exhibited further Blackout works at major exhibitions at the BALTIC Centre for Contemporary Art, Gateshead, UK; and at Nordin Gallery, Stockholm. Each exhibition included a different selection of works from the series. Holdsworth also worked with CIRCA Projects to produce an off-site lightbox installation, Blackout 10, which coincided with the "Blackout" exhibition at BALTIC, Gateshead. This lightbox installation was Holdsworth's first public installation commission, and the first in a series of large-scale lightbox works.

In 2012 his book Blackout, published by Steidl BG, was launched at Brancolini Grimaldi, London. The book contains the complete "Blackout" series and a new text written by British science writer and editor, Oliver Morton.

== Transmission: New Remote Earth Views ==
Holdsworth's 2012 series Transmission: New Remote Earth Views uses topographical data to present the American West in an entirely new way. Locations included are the Grand Canyon, Yosemite, Mount Shasta, Mount St. Helens, Salt Lake City, and Park City, Utah. The series was first presented in an exhibition at Brancolini Grimaldi, London, UK, in March 2012.

== Public collections ==
- Tate Gallery, London
- Pompidou Centre Collection, Paris
- Museum of Modern Art Vienna Collection, Vienna
- Victoria & Albert Museum Collection, London
- The Government Art Collection, London
- DG Bank Collection, Munich
- Worcester City Art Gallery, UK
- The Saatchi Collection, London
- UBS Art Collection, London
- Middlesbrough Institute of Modern Art Collection, UK
- University of the Arts Collection, London
- Hackney Museum, London
- Sheffield Museums Trust, UK
- British Airways Art Collection, UK
- Artist Pension Trust Collection, London
- The Northern Canon Collection, UK
- The Goetz Collection, Munich
- The Arts Council Collection, UK
- The Laing Art Gallery Collection, UK
- The Progressive Art Collection, USA

== Awards and fellowships ==
- 2008 Visiting Fellowship, The European Centre for Photographic Research, Newport, University of Wales
- 2007 Short listed for the Northern Art Prize, Leeds Art Gallery, Leeds, UK
- 2006 Arts Council of England Award, UK
- 2002 Arts Council of England Award, UK
- 2001 Short listed for Beck's Future's Prize, ICA, London

== Exhibitions ==
=== Selected recent solo exhibitions ===
- Spatial Objects, Southampton City Art Gallery, Southampton, UK, 2015
- Mirrors, Pippy Houldsworth Gallery, London, UK, 2014
- Transmission: New Remote Earth Views, National Glass Centre, Sunderland, UK, 2012
- Transmission: New Remote Earth Views, Brancolini Grimaldi, London, UK, 2012

=== Selected recent group exhibitions ===
- Monuments, Scheublein+Bak, Zurich, Switzerland, 2013
- Landmark: The Fields of Photography, Summerset House, London, UK, 2013
- Looking at the View, Tate Britain, London, UK, 2012
- Shifting Realities, Scheublein Fine Art, Zurich, Switzerland, 2012

== Monographs and artist books ==
- Forms FTP and Mirrors FTP. Published by Dan Holdsworth Studio, 2014. Essays by Emma Lewis and Joshua Wilson.
- Blackout. Published by Steidl BG, March 2012. Essay by British science writer and author, Oliver Morton.
- Dan Holdsworth. Published by Steidl, September 2005. Essays by Angus Carlyle and David Chandler and an interview by Charlotte Cotton.
