= Samantha Holdsworth =

Medical physicist from New Zealand

Samantha Jane Holdsworth is a medical physicist from New Zealand. She is an associate professor in medical imaging at the University of Auckland, a principal investigator at the Centre for Brain Research, and CE/Research Director at the Mātai Medical Research Institute in Gisborne, New Zealand.

== Biography ==
Holdsworth was born and grew up on a family farm near the small town of Te Karaka, near Gisborne, New Zealand. She initially studied engineering at the University of Canterbury in Christchurch, but changed to physics and completed an honours degree in the subject. She then moved to Australia and completed a master's degree at Queensland University of Technology, followed by a doctorate in radiology at the University of Queensland.

Following graduation, she moved to the United States and worked as a postdoctoral fellow in the Radiological Sciences Laboratory at Stanford University's Lucas Centre and then as a senior research scientist. In 2018 she returned to New Zealand and was appointed a senior lecturer at the University of Auckland, based at the Department of Anatomy and Medical Imaging. She also returned to her hometown of Gisborne and has established a medical imaging research, innovation, and education centre there, called Mātai Medical Research Institute. The institute uses medical imaging technology, research, and local education initiatives to reduce inequities in Gisborne, and develop medical research solutions that can be translated worldwide.

Holdsworth's research has led to improvements in MRI methodologies, including improvements to the resolution, speed and motion-robustness of MRI. These methods have in turn led to better detection of brain injury, stroke, and neurodegenerative disease.

Holdsworth currently oversees research on novel MRI method development and modelling for better disease detection, whole-body imaging, oncology, musculoskeletal imaging, neurodegenerative disease, methamphetamine addiction, neuroinflammatory disease, mild traumatic brain injury, vision research, and others.

At the University of Auckland she teaches into courses ranging from physics for life sciences to specalised medical imaging.

=== Personal life ===
Holdsworth is the daughter of businesswoman Bronwen Holdsworth and engineer Peter Holdsworth.
