= Holdsworth Motorhomes =

Defunct British company

The Holdsworth Motorhomes Company was a UK-based campervan conversion company running from 1968 to the mid-1990s, founded by Richard Holdsworth. It was one of the first UK campervan conversion companies, developing to hold contracts with British Leyland for the Sherpa, and the first UK company to hold approval from Volkswagen. The company ran into increasing financial difficulty, and ceased trading after one deal left the business with a surplus of stock. In 1996 its major assets were sold to new investors under Cockburn Holdsworth, but this venture was short lived, with production ending in 1998.

== History ==
Having returned from a motorhome trip around Australia, Richard and Heather Holdsworth wanted to continue their travels with trips around Europe. As a result, in 1968 they started converting a Volkswagen in their lockup garage in Clapham Common, London, with Richard constructing furniture and Heather the upholstery and soft furnishings including curtains.

After being asked to assist with other conversions, the couple began creating conversion kits for friends and other VW owners. After increasing production to sell via the commercial market, the company moved to Ashford, Surrey, and then in 1972 to a former aircraft hangar in Woodley, Berkshire. The company would convert many ordinary vans into campervans, these vehicles included Commer Standard and a Commer Super, Ford Transit, Bedford and two types of Volkswagen: one with a fixed roof and one with a rising roof. The line was extended with the addition in 1977 of the Leyland Sherpa van and the combination of VW vans that was offered was constantly evolving.

The company would branch away from camper vans into mini bus conversions and it was this side of the business that would ultimately see its downfall. A deal to supply a few thousand minibus conversions collapsed and the company was left holding stock that it couldn't sell. The financial burden of this overstocking would lead to its ultimate demise.
