= Walsin Lihwa Building =

Skyscraper office building in Xinyi, Taichung, Taiwan

- 華新麗華大樓
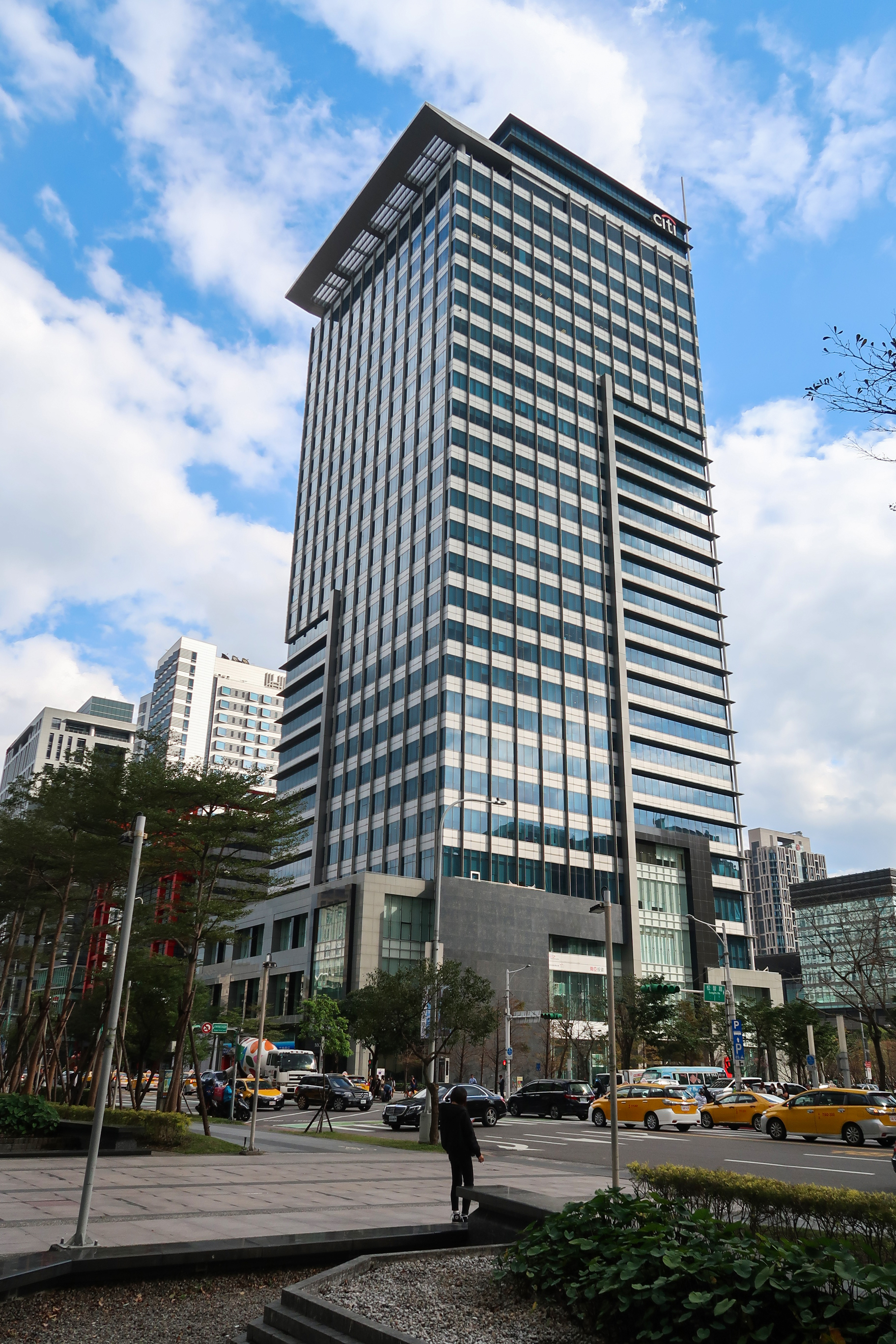
- Interactive map of the Walsin Lihwa Building area

General information
- Status: Completed
- Type: Office
- Location: No. 1 Songzhi Road, Xinyi District, Taipei, Taiwan
- Coordinates: 25.038967775789352°N 121.56630241291148°E
- Construction started: 2006
- Completed: 2009

Height
- Architectural: 134 m (440 ft)
- Roof: 125 m (410 ft)

Technical details
- Floor count: 27
- Floor area: 77,824.15 m^{2} (837,692.2 sq ft)

Design and construction
- Architect: LCRA Architects

The Walsin Lihwa Building, or Citibank Tower (Chinese: 華新麗華大樓; pinyin: Huá xīn lìhuá dàlóu), is a skyscraper office building located in Xinyi Special District, Xinyi District, Taipei, Taiwan. Construction of the building began in 2006 and it was completed in 2009. The height of the building is 134 m (440 ft), the floor area is 77,824.15 m^{2} (837,692.2 sq ft), and it comprises 27 floors above ground, as well as five basement levels.

The building was designed by LCRA Architects and it houses the headquarters of Citibank (Taiwan), as well as the New Zealand Commerce and Industry Office in Taipei and the Canadian Trade Office in Taipei.

== See also ==
- List of tallest buildings in Taiwan
- List of tallest buildings in Taichung
- Xinyi Special District
- Citibank
