= Oliver Morton (science writer) =

British science writer and editor

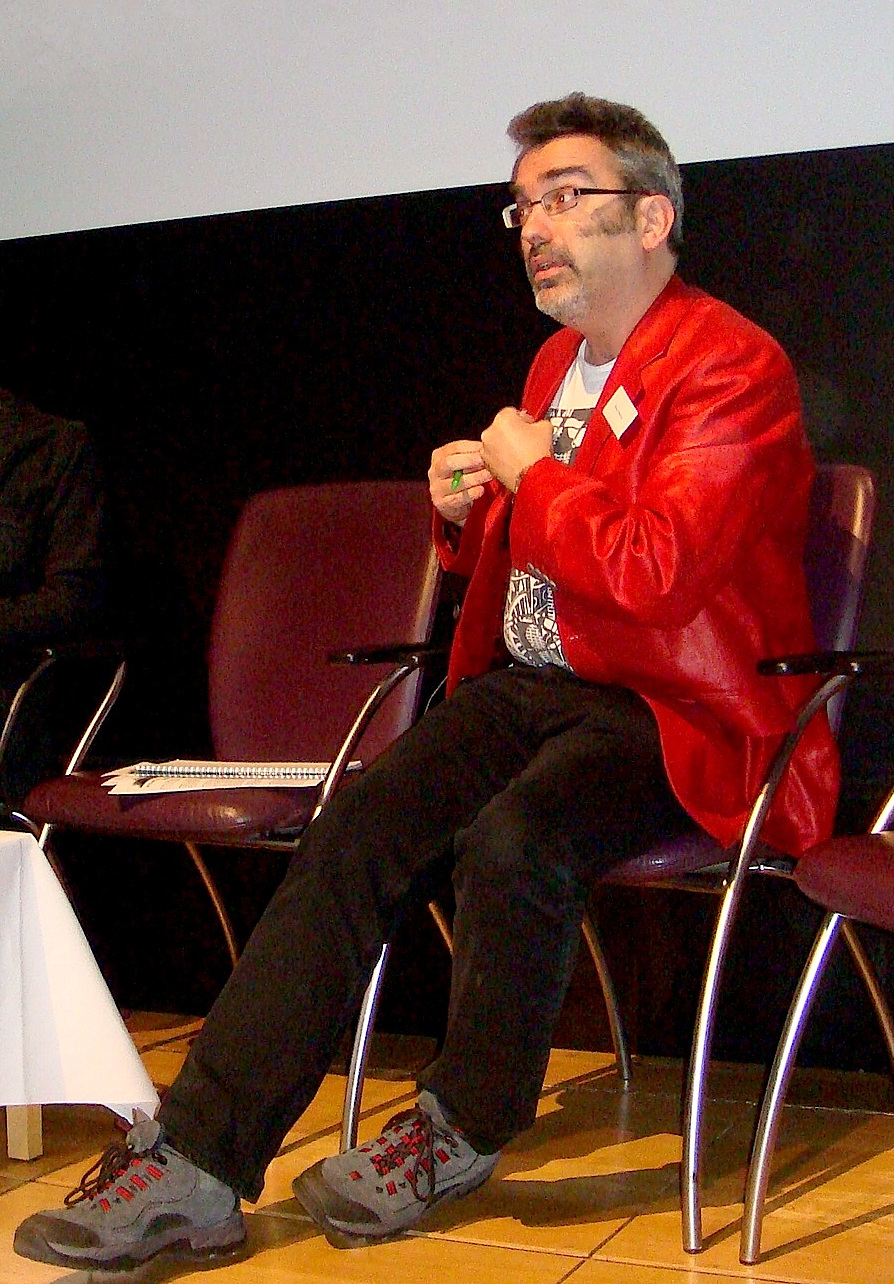
Oliver Morton in 2007

Oliver Morton is a British science writer and editor. He has written for many publications, including The American Scholar (for which he won the American Astronomical Society's 2004 David N. Schramm Award for High Energy Astrophysics Science Journalism), Discover, The Economist, The Independent, the Milwaukee Journal Sentinel, National Geographic, Nature (where he was the chief news and features editor), The New Yorker, Newsweek International, Prospect, and Wired.

In 2016, his book The Planet Remade was shortlisted for the Royal Society Insight Investment Science Book Prize.

Morton is a fellow of the Hybrid Vigor Institute. He has a degree in the history and philosophy of science from Cambridge University. He lives with his wife in Greenwich, England.

Asteroid 10716 Olivermorton is named for him.

== Books ==
- Mapping Mars: Science, Imagination, and the Birth of a World. Picador, 2002. ISBN 0-312-24551-3
- Eating the Sun: How Plants Power the Planet. Fourth Estate, a HarperCollins imprint, 2007. ISBN 978-0-00-717179-8
- The Planet Remade: How Geoengineering Could Change the World. Princeton University Press, 2016. ISBN 978-0-691-14825-0
- The Moon: A History for the Future. Economist Books, a Profile Books imprint, 2019. ISBN 978-1-788-16254-8
