= Houldsworth =

Houldsworth is a surname. Notable people with the surname include:

- Henry Houldsworth of the Houldsworth Baronets
- Henry Houldsworth, Lord Lieutenant of Moray
- Basil Houldsworth (1922–1990), British anesthetist and politician
- Thomas Houldsworth (1771–1852), English politician
- William Houldsworth (1834–1917), English politician
