= New Zealand Commerce and Industry Office, Taipei =

New Zealand Commerce and Industry Office, Taipei Te Mata O Aorere
- 紐西蘭商工辦事處
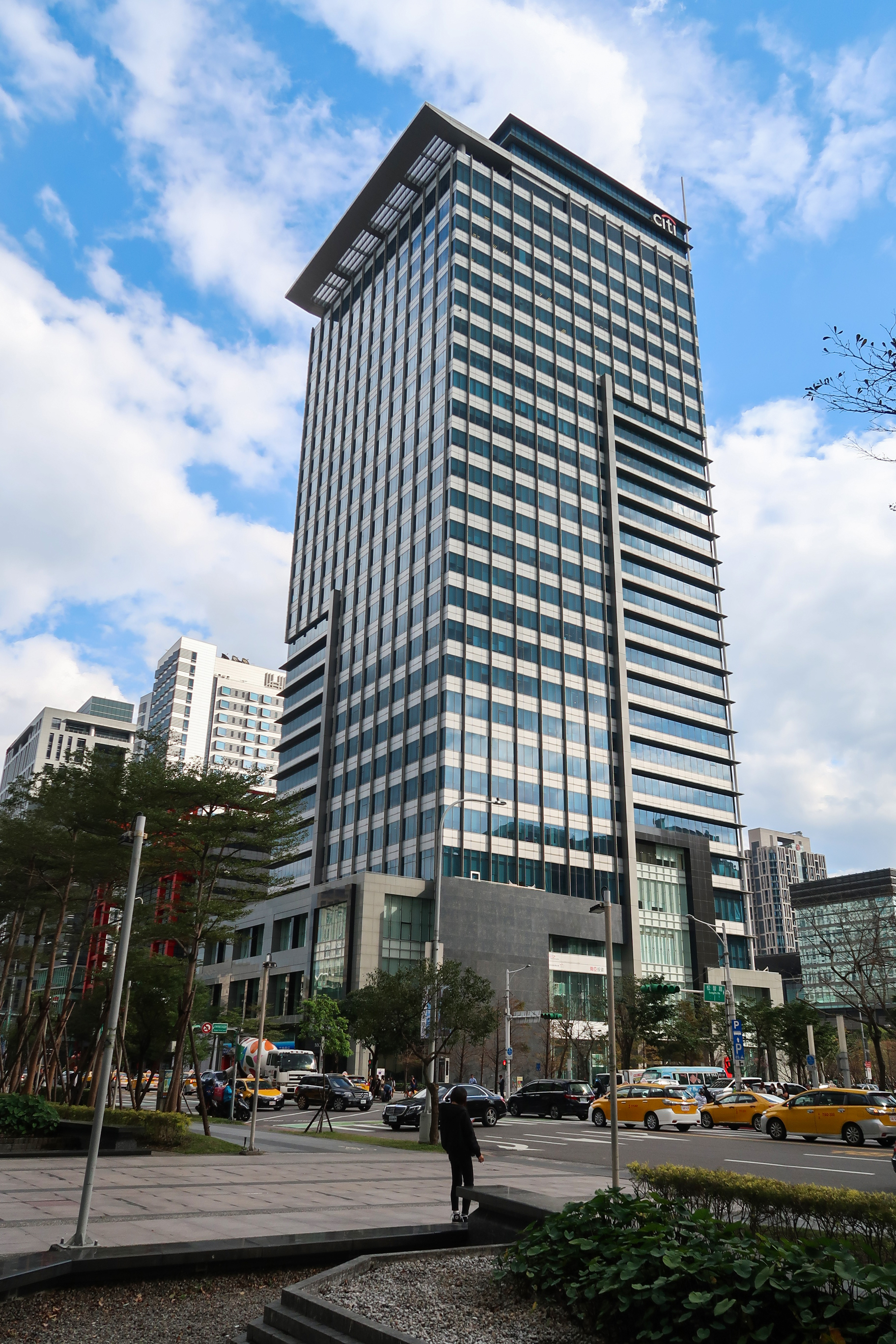
- The New Zealand Office at Walsin Lihwa Building

Agency overview
- Formed: 1987
- Jurisdiction: Republic of China (Taiwan)
- Headquarters: Xinyi, Taipei, Taiwan
- Agency executive: Chris Langley, Director
- Website: www.nzcio.com

The New Zealand Commerce and Industry Office, Taipei (Māori: Te Mata O Aorere; Chinese: 紐西蘭商工辦事處; pinyin: Niǔ Xī Lán Shānggōng Bànshì Chù; Pe̍h-ōe-jī: Liú Se Lân Siang-kang Pān-sū Chhù) represents New Zealand interests in Taiwan in the absence of formal diplomatic relations, functioning as a de facto embassy.

== History ==
Before 1972, New Zealand recognised Republic of China (Taiwan), but diplomatic relations were ended following the decision of the government of Norman Kirk to recognise the People's Republic of China, making it one of the first developed countries to do so. The Office was established in 1987.

== Functions and responsibilities ==
The Office is a subsidiary of the Wellington Employers' Chamber of Commerce, but is staffed by officers either employed directly by the Office or seconded from relevant New Zealand departments and agencies. These include the Ministry of Foreign Affairs and Trade.

Its counterpart in New Zealand is the Taipei Economic and Cultural Office in New Zealand in Wellington.

== See also ==
- New Zealand–Taiwan relations
