= Daniel Holdsworth =

Daniel Holdsworth may refer to:

- Daniel Holdsworth (musician) (born 1981), Australian musician and composer
- Daniel Holdsworth (rugby league) (born 1984), Australian rugby league player
