= John Holdsworth (rugby union) =

- Born: John Wynne Holdsworth; 10 September 1884 Sydney

Rugby union career
- Position: lock
International career
Years	Team	Apps	(Points)
1921–22	Wallabies	6	(3)

John Wynne Holdsworth (born 10 September 1884) was a rugby union player who represented Australia.

Holdsworth, a lock, was born in Sydney and claimed a total of 6 international rugby caps for Australia.
